= Witches (Marvel Comics) =

Comic book series

- Cover of Witches , trade paperback collected edition, art by Mike Deodato

Publication information
- Publisher: Marvel Comics
- Schedule: Fortnightly
- Format: Limited series
- Publication date: August – September 2004
- No. of issues: 4
- Main character(s): Jennifer Kale; Satana Hellstrom; Topaz

Creative team
- Created by: Bronwyn Carlton
- Written by: Brian Walsh
- Artist(s): Mike Deodato (#1-2); Will Conrad (#3-4)
- Letterer: Dave Sharpe
- Colorist(s): Cream Animation (#1); Mike Kelleher (#2-4)
- Editor(s): Axel Alonso; John Miesegaes

Collected editions
- Witches: ISBN 0-7851-1508-0

Witches is a supernatural comic book limited series that was published by Marvel Comics in 2004. Plotted by Bronwyn Carlton, with scripts by Brian Walsh, it featured art by Mike Deodato and Will Conrad.

== Publication history ==
Marvel Comics originally green-lit the storyline in late 2000 and released promotional art for the series in 2001 at both Comic-Con International (Marvel: 2001 Official Convention Preview Book, pages 18–19) and various comic book based websites. According to those original website advertisements, Marvel had planned on releasing the series (then titled The Way of the Witches) during the last week of September 2001. Marvel Comics had planned to capitalize on the female-based television shows and movies that were popular at the time such as Charmed, Buffy the Vampire Slayer, and Charlie's Angels with a comic book title of their own. The three characters decided upon were mostly unused magical female characters in their universe: Jennifer Kale from the Man-Thing comic, Topaz from the Werewolf by Night comic, and Satana, the Devil's Daughter, from several of Marvel's horror comics, primarily Son of Satan, The Haunt of Horror and Vampire Tales. They were to be led by the most recognizable Marvel comic-book sorcerer, Doctor Strange, with him acting as the Charlie's Angels-esque director. Aside from the main characters, other supernatural characters that were to have appeared in the series (according to artist Mike Deodato) included: Werewolf by Night, Man-Thing, Ghost Rider, Lilith the Daughter of Dracula, Lilith the Mother of All Demons, Moon Knight, Blade, and Daimon Hellstrom.

With Bronwyn Carlton as writer and Mike Deodato as artist, Marvel announced that the project would be a regular monthly release comic book once it was on their schedule. Several drafts of the story were made and Deodato himself confirmed that three issues worth of art were submitted to bosses, with Marvel making changes to both with each entry. After a period the title was completely revamped and became a slated mini-series project. Additional scripts and art were submitted but Marvel eventually put the title on hold for three years. As such Carlton and Deodato were forced to move on to other projects.

One of the projects Mike Deodato worked on was the successful run of The Incredible Hulk. Satisfied with his work, Marvel advanced Deodato to continue his work on The Amazing Spider-Man. Wishing to market this transfer, Marvel hired Brian Walsh to pick up on writing the Witches title. With Deodato busy on another title, Marvel hired artist Will Conrad to salvage as much of Deodato's previous work as possible and fill-in the blanks with his own.

== Plot summary ==
A descendant from a powerful magical family, Andy Kale is tricked into opening a book of magic and thus letting loose a terrible evil. Sensing what happens, Doctor Strange recruits three powerful witches: Andy's sister Jennifer Kale, Satana, and Topaz. He tells them they are to stop the evil monster before it destroys the world's mystics and then the world itself. Though the girls don't exactly see eye-to-eye due to their varied personalities, they agree to help.

== Characters ==
- Jennifer Kale: A descendant of a large magic family, Jennifer is a powerful sorceress. Her family are keepers of the Tome of Zhered-na, which is one of the most powerful Book of Shadows in existence. It is the creation of a divine and evil spirit who shared all their knowledge with a Kale family member who wrote down their words and passed the magic down throughout the years. Various gods were angered at their secrets being given to mortals, so they bound a demon called a Hellphyr in the book for protection. Born and raised in the Florida swamplands, Jennifer became a trusted ally to the Man-Thing, who helped her on various adventures. Currently studying at a college in San Francisco, California, Jennifer continues learning various aspects of magic in her spare time in order to become a high level Mage.
- Satana Hellstrom: The daughter of the high-level demon Marduk Kurios and a mortal woman, Satana is a high-ranking sorceress and succubus, stealing the souls of others to strengthen her life-force. While her brother Daimon Hellstrom rejected his dark legacy, Satana embraced hers and was raised by her father in Hell, becoming his prized pupil in the dark arts. As she grew older a rift formed between her and her father and she was banished to the mortal realm without his aid. She died while helping Doctor Strange when he was infected with The Curse of the Wolf, but was resurrected by him later in order to provide the "Demonic" element of the Witch trio.
- Topaz: As a young girl, Topaz never knew her true origins or heritage. Living as an orphan in India, Topaz developed empathy and magical abilities at an early age. She was adopted and raised by the sorcerer Taboo, who proved to be overly demanding of Topaz and her gifts. Through him she came to know Jack Russell, better known as Werewolf by Night. The two formed an on-again off-again relationship over various adventures together. Later the demon Mephisto kidnapped Topaz to Hell, telling her that she would grow to be powerful enough to destroy him on her 21st birthday. Remaining his prisoner for a time, she was eventually freed by Franklin Richards and Doctor Strange. She continued to study magic under the Sisters of Glastonbury Tor in Britain, but later became the owner of the Voodoo Lounge, a bar catering to those in the occult in Greenwich Village, Manhattan. She then decided to immerse herself in the mystic arts and training, becoming Doctor Strange's protégée. In doing so she caused her once Caucasian/blonde features to revert to those of an Indian woman.

== Story ramifications ==
- Satana is resurrected from the dead (again, see below).
- A new coven is formed between Jennifer Kale, Satana and Topaz.
- Doctor Strange still seeks to own the Tome of Zhered-na, but the coven continues to stop him.
- Doctor Strange stops his magical training of Topaz.
- Illusion, Andy Kale, and the Hellphyr are killed.
- Satana's father Marduk Kurios seeks to destroy all mystics save himself.

== Collected editions ==
The series has been collected into a trade paperback:

- Witches (96 pages, October 2004, ISBN 0-7851-1508-0)
