= The Legion of Night =

Fictional comic book organization

Group publication information
- Publisher: Marvel Comics
- First appearance: The Legion of Night #1 (October 1991)
- Created by: Steve Gerber; Whilce Portacio

In-story information
- Base(s): Arizona
- Agent(s): Martin Gold; Jennifer Kale; Dr. Chan Liuchow; Omen/Charles Blackwater; Dr. Katherine Reynolds; Ariann Wight; Leena Wolfe

Legion of Night
- : Cover of The Legion of Night #1 (Oct. 1991). Art by Whilce Portacio & Scott Williams.

Series publication information
- Format: Limited series
- Genre: Horror
- Publication date: October – October 1991
- Number of issues: 2

Creative team
- Writer(s): Steve Gerber
- Penciller(s): Whilce Portacio
- Inker(s): Scott Williams; Dan Panosian
- Letterer(s): John Workman
- Colorist(s): Paul Mounts
- Creator(s): Steve Gerber; Whilce Portacio
- Editor(s): Tom DeFalco; Len Kaminski; Ralph Macchio

Collected editions
- (Part One): ISBN 087135750X
- (Part Two): ISBN 0871357518

The Legion of Night is a fictional organization appearing in American comic books published by Marvel Comics. They were dedicated to opposing occult threats. The group was composed of Ariann Wight, Dr. Chan Liuchow, Dr. Katherine Reynolds, Martin Gold, Jennifer Kale, and Omen/Charles Blackwater. Later, Omen brought private investigator Leena Wolfe onto the team, but she has not been shown in action with them.

The group was created by Steve Gerber and Whilce Portacio.

== Publication history ==
Dr. Chan Liuchow was created by Stan Lee and Jack Kirby, first appearing in Strange Tales #89, the discoverer and original opponent of Fin Fang Foom, who in the group's eponymous two-issue prestige format mini-series, became possessed by a demon, Aan Taanu.

Gerber had previously introduced Dr. Katherine Reynolds as a supporting character to Daimon Hellstrom in Marvel Spotlight #14 (Nov. 1971-April 1977) and Martin Gold as a supporting character to Lilith, Daughter of Dracula in Vampire Tales #6, while Jennifer Kale debuted in Adventure into Fear #11, which was Gerber's first story for Marvel. The other members of the team were introduced specifically for the series.

Man-Thing appeared in the series as well, but only in a vision, in which the normally mute and non-sentient character was able to speak with Jennifer.

Gerber expressed interest in writing about the characters again, but Marvel has not. The only follow-up to the initial prestige format limited series was a backup story in Midnight Sons Unlimited #9.

== Plot ==
The story of the limited series deals with the suicide of Charles Blackwater, whose soul is morphed into Omen, and the visions of Dr. Katherine Reynolds, now a patient in a mental institution, who keeps saying "Fin Fang Foom". Reynolds, who had previously worked with Daimon Hellstrom, was abducted by a group known only as The Agency and given drugs that enhanced her latent psionic powers.

Jennifer Kale, now in college and living with an overweight boyfriend, Bernard Drabble, has not used her magic in years (she was last seen midwifing the "birth" of Quagmire through Man-Thing in Marvel Comics Presents vol. 1 #29), but suddenly feels compelled to, and receives encouragement from Man-Thing when she dreams that he is sitting next to her on an airplane.

In China, Dr. Chan is trying to explain to officials that there is a new part of the prophecy of Fin Fang Foom that he has only recently uncovered. In New York, Martin Gold is now working for a paranormal magazine, having previously done hard journalism. He has rethought his life after his relationship with Angel O'Hara and her possession by Lilith.

Omen summons the team to the apartment of Charles Atwater, whom Omen had recently resurrected in order to take control of his body.

Blackwater was forced to commit suicide by a former client, The Beyond Reason Spiritual Fellowship, which was resurrecting their hedonistic god, Aan Tanu, through the body of Fin Fang Foom. The Fellowship was based on a rare religious tome that its male leader, Reeve Calder, believed was a hoax. Its female leader, Hildreth, mates with Aan Tanu to create a demonic child. Ariann, however, rips the child out of her womb and kills it.
