= Elementals (Marvel Comics) =

Fictional organization in the Marvel Universe

Publication information
- Publisher: Marvel Comics
- First appearance: Supernatural Thrillers #8 (August 1974)
- Created by: Jenny Blake Isabella; Val Mayerik

In-story information
- Member(s): Hellfire; Hydron; Magnum; Zephyr

The Elementals is a fictional organization appearing in American comic books published by Marvel Comics.

A variation of the Elementals appeared in the Marvel Cinematic Universe live-action film Spider-Man: Far From Home (2019).

== Publication history ==
The Elementals first appeared in Supernatural Thrillers #8 (August 1974), and were created by Jenny Blake Isabella and Val Mayerik.

The group subsequently appears in Supernatural Thrillers #9–15 (October 1974 – October 1975) and Ms. Marvel #11–12 (November–December 1977).

== Fictional biography ==
The Elementals are four extradimensional humanoid beings who achieved immortality and gained power over the forces of nature. They ruled a kingdom on the planet Earth before the original Atlantis rose. The group consists of Hydron, the lord of waters; Magnum, the master of earth; Hellfire, the wielder of flame; and Zephyr, the mistress of winds. The Elementals used N'Kantu, the Living Mummy as a pawn against the Living Monolith to take the Ruby Scarab from them. However, Zephyr betrays the other Elementals and allies with N'Kantu. The Elementals attack Zephyr, N'Kantu, and their allies and take the Scarab from them. When the Elementals try to release their energies through the Scarab, they are blasted off Earth.

The Elementals return to Earth and pursue Zephyr and the Scarab, coming into conflict with the entity Hecate. Taking Zephyr hostage, Hellfire and Hydron force her allies to recover the Scarab. Ms. Marvel arrives and together with Hecate, battles the Elementals, defeating them one by one.

== Team lineup ==
- Hellfire – The leader of the villainous group, who can generate fire and flames.
- Hydron – A foe with aquatic powers, including the ability to control water.
- Magnum – He has abilities that allow manipulation of earth, minerals, and rock.
- Zephyr – The sole female of the team who has the power to control wind, sky and air.

== In other media ==
The Elementals appear in Spider-Man: Far From Home. This version of the group are illusions used by Mysterio.
