= Hulkbuster =

Hulkbuster may refer to:

- Hulkbuster armor, a fictional powered exoskeleton worn by the Marvel Comics superhero Iron Man to combat the Hulk
  - Hulkbuster armor (Marvel Cinematic Universe)
- Hulkbusters, three fictional organizations formed to combat the Hulk
- "Hulk Buster", an episode of the television series Iron Man

== See also ==
- "Hulk Busted", an episode of the television series Hulk and the Agents of S.M.A.S.H.
