= Marduk Kurios =

Marvel Comics fictional character

- Marduk Kurios as depicted in Marvel Zombies: The Book of Angels, Demons & Various Monstrosities #1 (September 2007).

Publication information
- Publisher: Marvel Comics
- First appearance: As Satan: Marvel Spotlight #13 (January 1974); As Marduk Kurios: Hellstorm: Prince of Lies #16 (July 1994)
- Created by: Mike Friedrich; Warren Ellis; Herb Trimpe; Leonardo Manco

In-story information
- Species: Demon
- Team affiliations: Hell-Lords
- Notable aliases: Satan

Marduk Kurios is a character appearing in American comic books published by Marvel Comics. He is a demon who has repeatedly posed as Satan and is the father of Daimon Hellstrom and Satana Hellstrom.

Marduk appeared in the Hulu television series Helstrom, played by Mitch Pileggi.

== Fictional character biography ==
Marduk Kurios is a high-level demon and the ruler of one realm of Hell. Like many other demons, he has falsely taken on the titles of Satan, Lucifer, and the devil to further strengthen his power and devotion. Marduk is actually the biblical Lucifer of the Abrahamic religions, as the N'Garai told his daughter Satana when they were hunting her in revenge that, in prehistoric times, her father repelled their invasion of Earth as the head of Heaven's army.

In ancient times, the Sumerians worshipped Marduk as a god after seeing a previous battle his legions of Hell took part in on Earth. After becoming enamored with the Hellstrom family, who practiced Satanism, and took the form of a human. In this guise, Marduk married Victoria Hellstrom and moved to Lake Fire, Massachusetts. There, Victoria gave birth to Daimon Hellstrom, and a year and a half later gave birth to Satana Hellstrom. Over the years, Marduk saw that Daimon did not care for his dark family legacy and instead gave affection to his daughter, who did. While performing a ritual with Satana involving animal sacrifice, Victoria accidentally discovered Marduk's true nature. Driven insane, Victoria spent the remainder of her life in an asylum, where she kept a diary that she meant to give to Daimon once he was old enough to understand its contents.

Marduk returns to his realm with Satana, leaving Daimon on Earth to be cared for by servants. On Daimon's 21st birthday, Marduk invites his son to rule by his side, offering eternal life and power incarnate. Daimon rejects his father's offer and steals Marduk's netheranium trident, taking a portion of Marduk's power.

Marduk tests Satana's loyalty by having her battle the Four, a group of sorcerers. After killing the Four, Satana discovers that her father was behind the plot. Satana fails to kill Michael Heron, one of her new allies, in honor of her father. This angers Marduk, who banishes Satana to Earth.

In a battle with the Defenders, Daimon's soul is released and he agrees to serve his father in Hell. During Daimon's final training, Marduk asked Daimon to kill a human in his honor. When Daimon failed to comply Marduk revealed that, although he has lived under many faces over the centuries, not all of them have been evil. He told Daimon that he was secretly pleased with his choice but then banished him to Earth, no longer under his care.

Daimon eventually learns Marduk's true name from the witch Lavoisin and overthrows him, becoming the new ruler of his father's realm in Hell. Greatly reduced in power, Marduk tricks the warlock Andrew Kale into opening the Tome of Zhered-Na (a powerful Book of Shadows belonging to the Kale family). In doing so, the demon named the Hellphyr was released. The Hellphyr then began to attack various magical persons to steal their power and kill them shortly afterward. In causing this, Marduk had hoped to rid the world of a good percentage of its magic users for him to acquire a better rank among magic's stairway. Marduk offered Satana the opportunity to help him in this scheme and thus receive a higher standing herself in the realm of magic. Refusing his offer, Satana killed the Hellphyr with the help of two witches, Jennifer Kale (Andrew's sister) and Topaz. In doing so, Marduk made enemies of both his children as he searched for another way to regain his previous level of power.

During the Fear Itself story line, Marduk attends the Devil's Advocacy, where the Hell-Lords discuss the Serpent's actions on Earth. Marduk taunts Mephisto during this meeting.

== Powers and abilities ==
Not much is known about Marduk Kurios' powers, but they are mentioned to be more powerful in his realm of Hell than on Earth.

== In other media ==
Marduk Karios appears in Helstrom, portrayed by Mitch Pileggi.
