= List of Hulk and the Agents of S.M.A.S.H. episodes =

Hulk and the Agents of S.M.A.S.H. is an animated television series based on the superheroes Hulk, She-Hulk, Red Hulk (Thunderbolt Ross), Skaar and A-Bomb. The series premiered on Disney XD in the United States on August 11, 2013 and officially ended on June 28, 2015. Hulk and the Agents of S.M.A.S.H. aired alongside Ultimate Spider-Man, Avengers Assemble and Guardians of the Galaxy during the Marvel Universe block on Disney XD.

== Series overview ==
Season	Episodes	Originally released	
Season	Episodes	First released	Last released
1	26	August 11, 2013	December 3, 2014
2	26	October 12, 2014	June 28, 2015

== Episodes ==
=== Season 1 (2013–14) ===
No. overall	No. in season	Title	Directed by	Written by	Original release date	U.S. viewers (millions)
1 2	1 2	"Doorway to Destruction"	Dan Fausett	Paul Dini	August 11, 2013	N/A
Part 1: The Hulk and Rick Jones respond to a gamma portal from the Negative Zone created by Annihilus in an effort to drain Earth's resources. But unable to get through, Annihilus sends a mind-controlled Skaar to retrieve a Gamma ray cannon to help him push through. Red Hulk traces the portal and arrives to lend a much needed hand in battle, but is later captured by Annihilus and Rick is injured by the gamma explosion. Part 2: The explosion caused by the fight against Annihilus' army has turned Rick Jones into A-Bomb. With the help of She-Hulk and Hulk, A-Bomb travels to the Negative Zone to rescue Red Hulk and defeat Annihilus. In the end, when Hulk rescues Skaar, he discovers that he is involved with someone else besides Annihilus.
3	3	"Hulk Busted"	Roy Smith	Henry Gilroy	August 18, 2013	N/A
Following a fight with Blastaar, the Agents of S.M.A.S.H. work with Iron Man when Leader hijacks the Hulkbuster armors.
4	4	"The Collector"	Dan Fausett	Eugene Son	August 25, 2013	N/A
The Hulk and Spider-Man team up to stop the Collector from capturing every hero on Earth.
5	5	"All About the Ego"	Roy Smith	Brandon Auman	September 1, 2013	N/A
The Agents of S.M.A.S.H. face their biggest foe yet when they travel into space to battle Ego the Living Planet, who threatens to tear Earth apart. To survive, they have to tackle the second biggest ego in the galaxy – that of the Red Hulk's.
6	6	"Savage Land"	Dan Fausett	Steven Melching	September 15, 2013	0.56
A-Bomb is eager to prove himself to an overprotective Hulk and finds an unlikely mentor in Red Hulk. When Sauron plans to cause an eruption from a super-volcano in the Savage Land, A-Bomb finds himself facing a trial by fire as well as an encounter with Devil Dinosaur.
7	7	"The Incredible Shrinking Hulks"	Roy Smith	Paul Dini	September 22, 2013	0.50
A-Bomb's birthday calls for a celebratory game of mini-golf. However, the Leader shrinks the Agents of S.M.A.S.H. with a shrink ray. Now they must stop the Leader before he can destroy them.
8	8	"Hulks on Ice"	Roy Smith	Eugene Son	October 6, 2013	0.44
The Hulks join forces with Thor to stop Laufey and the Frost Giants from freezing the world by freeing Ymir.
9	9	"Of Moles and Men"	Dan Fausett	Steven Melching	October 27, 2013	0.49
Believing his presence in Vista Verde is putting its citizens in danger, Hulk goes underground to Subterranea and becomes a savior to the Moloids. After giant Larvae-Beasts attack, Hulk gains the unlikely assistance of Mole Man in stopping them.
10	10	"Wendigo Apocalypse"	Patrick Archibald	Brandon Auman	November 3, 2013	0.43
When the Agents of S.M.A.S.H. arrive at a remote ski resort in the mountains for some long-needed R&R much to the irritation of Hulk, they discover that their resort is overrun by Wendigos. The Agents and Wolverine work together to defeat the Wendigo King and break the curse on the resort inhabitants.
11	11	"The Skaar Whisperer"	Dan Fausett	Adam Beechen	November 10, 2013	0.52
Skaar gets a lesson in civility from Doc Samson while the Agents of S.M.A.S.H. battle Absorbing Man who takes on gamma energy to turn himself into an unstoppable force after escaping from the Vault.
12	12	"Into the Negative Zone"	Patrick Archibald	Henry Gilroy	November 17, 2013	0.43
Hulk begrudgingly teams up with Thing to take the fight to the Leader's doorstep when his archenemy puts the lives of the Agents of S.M.A.S.H. on the line.
13	13	"Red Rover"	Dan Fausett	Paul Dini	November 24, 2013	0.42
An irritated Red Hulk accidentally drops Devil Dinosaur in Latveria, prompting Doctor Doom to attack the Agents of S.M.A.S.H.
14	14	"The Venom Within"	Patrick Archibald	Brandon Auman	December 8, 2013	0.40
Hulk and Spider-Man have to save the day when his friends are possessed by symbiotes who were unleashed by Doctor Octopus and rampage through New York City to destroy Spider-Man.
15	15	"Galactus Goes Green"	Dan Fausett	Brandon Auman	January 19, 2014	0.34
While the Agents of S.M.A.S.H. are in Las Vegas, Galactus comes to Earth looking for a new herald and settles on She-Hulk after she defeated Terrax.
16	16	"The Trouble With Machines"	Dan Fausett	Eugene Son	January 26, 2014	0.48
The Hulks have crashed their Jump Jet more times than they can count, and it is out for revenge now that the Leader has given it artificial intelligence.
17	17	"Abomination"	Patrick Archibald	Steve Melching	February 2, 2014	0.43
Abomination, a villain from Hulk's past, takes out the Agents of S.M.A.S.H. to exact revenge and frame the team for destroying Vista Verde.
18	18	"Mission Impossible Man"	Dan Fausett	Paul Dini	February 9, 2014	0.29
The Agents of S.M.A.S.H.'s biggest fan Impossible Man appears to join the Agents of S.M.A.S.H., combining Hulk and Red Hulk into the Two-Headed Compound Hulk for his own amusement. This also proves to be their biggest problem when Sauron absorbs Impossible Man's powers and summons Fin Fang Foom to battle them.
19	19	"For Asgard"	Patrick Archibald	Eugene Son	February 23, 2014	0.35
After Loki initiates Ragnarök, Hulk ends up breaking Odin's law by saving Skaar. The Agents of S.M.A.S.H. must set aside their differences with Thor, Heimdall, and the Warriors Three when Malekith the Accursed and his Dark Elves threaten to destroy the Nine Realms.
20	20	"Stranger in a Strange Land"	Dan Fausett	Brandon Auman	March 30, 2014	0.51
To help the aspiring magician A-Bomb get a lesson in hard work, Hulk puts him under the tutelage of Doctor Strange at the Sanctum Sanctorum. When Dormammu abducts Strange and the Agents of S.M.A.S.H. arrive to help fight Dormammu and the Mindless Ones, A-Bomb has to use what he learned from Strange to save Earth.
21	21	"Deathlok"	Patrick Archibald	Henry Gilroy & Todd Casey	April 13, 2014	0.57
When the Hulks thwart Deathlok from attacking a girl in the mall (who is actually a shape-shifting Super-Skrull in disguise), they unintentionally start a Skrull invasion that Deathlok was planning to stop.
22	22	"Inhuman Nature"	Patrick Archibald	Adam Beechen	June 15, 2014	N/A
A-Bomb's crush on a mysterious girl named Crystal leads the Agents of S.M.A.S.H. to the secret home of the Inhumans (consisting of Black Bolt, Medusa, Gorgon, Triton, Lockjaw, Karnak and Maximus), an isolationist race that keeps themselves cut off from mankind. The Agents of S.M.A.S.H. even take action when Maximus makes plans to annihilate mankind.
23	23	"The Hunted"	Dan Fausett	Eugene Son	June 22, 2014	N/A
Annoyed with his fellow Agents of S.M.A.S.H. members, Hulk takes off for some alone time and crash-lands on Monster Island. He encounters Goom and her children and must protect them from Arkon.
24	24	"Monsters No More" (Part 1)	Patrick Archibald	Brandon Auman	June 29, 2014	N/A
Due to the many heroic acts they have done including their collaboration with the Fantastic Four to stop the Tribbitite invasion, the world finally accepts the Agents of S.M.A.S.H. as heroes where even J. Jonah Jameson withdraws what he has said about the Hulk many times. Before the Agents of S.M.A.S.H. can enjoy their success, a surprise attack from Leader and his Agents of C.R.A.S.H. (consisting of Abomination, Absorbing Man, Blastaar, Sauron, and Titania) threatens to destroy Vista Verde with gamma bombs and discredit the Agents of S.M.A.S.H.
25	25	"Planet Leader" (Part 2)	Dan Fausett	Henry Gilroy	July 13, 2014	N/A
Following the incident caused by the Agents of C.R.A.S.H., the Agents of S.M.A.S.H. get transported to Skaar's home planet Sakaar, where they must stop Leader from controlling the entire planet and the Agents of S.M.A.S.H. themselves.
26	26	"It's a Wonderful Smash"	Patrick Archibald	Steven Melching	December 3, 2014	N/A
On Christmas, the Agents of S.M.A.S.H. and the Guardians of the Galaxy must break free from a simulated paradise created by the Collector and reclaim the Orb of Truth, which is needed as part of a peace meeting between the Kree and the Shi'ar.

=== Season 2 (2014–15) ===
No. overall	No. in season	Title	Directed by	Written by	Original release date	U.S. viewers (millions)
27 28	1 2	"Planet Hulk"	Patrick Archibald Dan Fausett	Marty Isenberg Kevin Hopps	October 12, 2014	N/A
Part 1: While looking for a way back to Earth, the Hulks discover the Leader stowed away on board the ship. Retribution must wait as the Agents of S.M.A.S.H. have to fight Ronan the Accuser and his Kree soldiers to save an old foe: Ego the Living Planet. When Galactus comes to consume Ego, the Agents of S.M.A.S.H. must put themselves at risk to save him. Part 2: The Agents of S.M.A.S.H. must work together with Ego to fight with Galactus and his herald Firelord.
29	3	"Fear Itself"	Patrick Archibald	Brandon Auman	October 26, 2014	N/A
With help from the Silver Surfer, the Agents of S.M.A.S.H. must face their fears to stop Null the Living Darkness from crossing through a wormhole and attacking Earth.
30	4	"Guardians of the Galaxy"	Dan Fausett	Henry Gilroy	November 2, 2014	N/A
After being lured to an unnamed planet, the Agents of S.M.A.S.H. team up with their old friends the Guardians of the Galaxy to stop Super-Skrull and the Skrulls from using the Agents of S.M.A.S.H.'s gamma energy to create gamma-powered Skrulls in their latest plot to invade Earth.
31	5	"Future Shock"	Patrick Archibald	Paul Dini	November 9, 2014	N/A
After Leader tricks Skaar into entering a temporal displacement wormhole to Earth, the Hulks return to Earth a thousand years in the future only to discover that the High Evolutionary has turned all humans into Animal Men using a gamma meteor. The High Evolutionary evolves Hulk to serve him and devolves A-Bomb, Red Hulk, and She-Hulk too. Skaar is unaffected and steps up to save the team and all of mankind.
32	6	"A Druff is Enough"	Dan Fausett	Steven Melching	November 16, 2014	N/A
When A-Bomb brings an alien called a Druff aboard the ship, he puts the team at risk when it starts taking over, jeopardizing the team's only shot at getting back to Earth while Ronan the Accuser targets them.
33	7	"Homecoming"	Patrick Archibald	Marty Isenberg	January 18, 2015	N/A
The Agents of S.M.A.S.H. return to Earth with Leader still in their possession and find Vista Verde under the rule of Abomination and commanding an army of Hulkbusters. Now the Agents of S.M.A.S.H. must liberate Vista Verde and defeat Abomination before he can use one of Thunderbolt Ross' old weapons in his plan to attack other nations.
34	8	"The Hulking Commandos"	Patrick Archibald	Brandon Auman	October 19, 2014	N/A
On Halloween, the Agents of S.M.A.S.H. encounter Nick Fury's Howling Commandos (consisting of Blade, Frankenstein's Monster, Man-Thing, N'Kantu, the Living Mummy, and Werewolf by Night), who Nick Fury has sent to apprehend the Agents of S.M.A.S.H. However, the Howling Commandos have a change of plans when they help the Agents of S.M.A.S.H. prevent Dormammu from breaking into Earth's dimension and turning all of humanity into Mindless Ones.
35	9	"Spidey, I Blew up the Dinosaur"	Dan Fausett	Henry Gilroy	January 25, 2015	0.38
While being pursued by the military, the Agents of S.M.A.S.H. go after Leader when he steals confiscated weapons from their vault. After the Leader enlarges Devil Dinosaur, the Agents of S.M.A.S.H. team up with Spider-Man to stop Devil Dinosaur and restore him to normal size while having to deal with Abomination and the Hulkbusters.
36	10	"The Strongest One There Is"	Dan Fausett	Paul Giacoppo	February 1, 2015	N/A
A-Bomb starts to doubt his strength as an Agent of S.M.A.S.H. and must learn to use his other attributes against Xemnu, an intergalactic fighting champion, for the fate of Earth.
37	11	"The Dopplesmashers"	Patrick Archibald	Marty Isenberg	February 8, 2015	N/A
The Agents of S.M.A.S.H. are framed by Abomination and evil gamma-powered doppelgangers of themselves for attacking the S.H.I.E.L.D. Tri-carrier. Upon arriving at the Tri-Carrier as Nick Fury falls unconscious during the attack, the Agents of S.M.A.S.H. fight the Doppplesmashers which are shapeshifting gamma reactor-powered robots created by Leader, who has become Abomination's partner. Now the Agents of S.M.A.S.H. must defeat the Dopplesmashers before they use the Tri-Carrier to destroy the Cheyenne Mountain Complex as a fail-safe and cause World War III.
38	12	"The Big Green Mile"	Dan Fausett	Steven Melching	February 15, 2015	N/A
After the Agents of S.M.A.S.H. stop the Tri-Carrier from crashing into the Cheyenne Mountain Complex, they are apprehended by the Hulkbusters and imprisoned in the Vault. When Nick Fury plans to show up for an inspection, the Agents of S.M.A.S.H. must prevent Abomination from beginning his next plan to discredit the Agents of S.M.A.S.H.
39	13	"The Green Room"	Patrick Archibald	Marty Isenberg	February 22, 2015	0.49
After S.H.I.E.L.D. exonerates them from the frame-up in Vista Verde caused by the Agents of C.R.A.S.H., the Agents of S.M.A.S.H. track the Leader to his hideout on the Isle of Lucee. They get stuck in a deadly maze where Hulk's rage is drained, making him mellowed out. After the rest of his teammates are captured, Hulk finds them in Leader's clutches at the center of the maze where Leader uses his machine to manifest Hulk's dark side in the physical form of Dark Hulk.
40	14	"The Defiant Hulks"	Dan Fausett	Paul Dini	March 1, 2015	0.59
Hulk reluctantly fills in as Mayor of Vista Verde while Mayor Stan is on vacation. Red and Skaar leave the team to start their own webcast as bounty hunters - their first target being Abomination. But things get complicated when the Red Ghost and his Super-Apes are also after Abomination, planning to siphon his energy and make an army of Abomin-Apes.
41	15	"Enter, the Maestro"	Dan Duncan	Brandon Auman	March 8, 2015	0.42
While saving Earth from a potentially catastrophic gamma meteor that was previously mentioned in "Future Shock", the Agents of S.M.A.S.H. come face to face with a future version of Hulk called Maestro who might not be the hero they think he is.
42	16	"The Tale of Hercules"	Dan Fausett	Todd Casey	March 15, 2015	0.45
The Agents of S.M.A.S.H. travel to ancient Greece and team up with Hercules to stop Pluto from turning everyone on Earth to stone using the Shield of Minerva.
43	17	"Banner Day"	Dan Duncan	Marty Isenberg	March 22, 2015	N/A
With help from Betty Ross, Hulk allows himself to be turned back into Bruce Banner. However, this leaves him powerless and unable to combat Ronan the Accuser's attack on Earth.
44	18	"Wheels of Fury"	Dan Fausett	Henry Gilroy	March 29, 2015	N/A
The Agents of S.M.A.S.H. attempt to help Iron Man subdue his gaming A.I. creation Mainframe in a roller derby game for the fate of the planet, but are faced with a challenge when they discover only She-Hulk knows how to skate.
45 49	19 23	"Days of Future Smash"	Dan Duncan Dan Fausett Steven Melchling	Paul Dini Marty Isenberg Brandon Auman Steven Melching	May 10, 2015 May 17, 2015 May 24, 2015 May 31, 2015 June 7, 2015	N/A
Part 1: The Dino Era: Leader has escaped from the S.H.I.E.L.D. Tri-Carrier and stolen Doctor Doom's time belt from the Latverian embassy. Hulk chases Leader back to the Mesozoic and Hulk battles Leader and his mind-controlled dinosaurs while befriending a young Devil Dinosaur. Back in the present, the rest of the Agents of S.M.A.S.H. work with El Diablo (an intelligent version of Devil Dinosaur) and Spider-Raptor (a Velociraptor version of Spider-Man) to stop King Sauron from killing Moon-Boy and the primitive humans. Part 2: Smashgard: Hulk follows Leader back in time to the Viking Age where they are apprehended by a young Thor and Loki, who accuse them of trying to steal the Berserker Staff. When Odin goes into his Odinsleep, Hulk teams up with Thor and Loki to keep Leader from taking the Asgardian throne. In the present, the Agents of S.M.A.S.H. fight to stop "All Father" Leader, who is served by Thor, Loki, and gamma-powered Frost Giants. Part 3: Dracula: Hulk follows Leader back in time to 1890 during the Victorian era and unites Frankenstein's Monster, N'Kantu the Living Mummy, and Werewolf by Night's grandfather as the Howling Commandos. They must thwart Leader and Dracula's plan to shroud the Earth with Leader's Gamma Furnace allowing vampires to prey night and day. In the present, the Agents of S.M.A.S.H. deal with the Vampire Lord Hulk, who is ruling the vampire-dominated present after eliminating Dracula and the Leader. Note: This episode aired on Watch Disney XD on May 18, 2015. Part 4: The Hydra Years: Chasing Leader through time to World War II, Hulk teams up with a young Captain America to stop Red Skull, whom the Leader has enhanced with gamma energy. In the present, the Agents of S.M.A.S.H. work with Captain America to free the world from Hydra, which is now led by the Leader. Part 5: The Tomorrow Smashers: Finally catching up to the Leader in the present, Hulk reunites with the Agents of S.M.A.S.H. as Leader uses his time belt to summon paradox monsters from alternate timelines. During the fight with Leader and the paradox monsters, Hulk is unexpectedly whisked into the future by teenage Smashers consisting of Leader's son Junior, A-Bomb's son RJ3, and Red Hulk's twin children Thad and Betts. The next Generation Smashers need Hulk's help to battle the Leader, who has assumed a robotic supercomputer body and plans to replace everyone on Earth with Leader clone versions of themselves while the real humans are placed in the Negative Zone.
50	24	"Spirit of Vengeance"	Dan Fausett	Todd Casey	June 14, 2015	N/A
While escorting Abomination to stand trial for his crimes, the Agents of S.M.A.S.H. run into Ghost Rider who has come to make Abomination atone for his sins. After burning the gamma out of Abomination, reverting him to his human form, Ghost Rider plans to make Red Hulk atone for his sins that played a part in the Hulk's creation.
51 52	25 26	"Planet Monster"	Dan Duncan Dan Fausett	Marty Isenberg Paul Dini	June 21, 2015 June 28, 2015	N/A
Part 1: A Kree armada led by the Supreme Intelligence is invading in retaliation for Ronan the Accuser's incarceration. When the Kree free Ronan and Leader, Hulk is torn between his two teams the Agents of S.M.A.S.H. and the Avengers where both groups fight to prevent the Kree from destroying Earth. Part 2: After Hulk is absorbed by the Supreme Intelligence, the Agents of S.M.A.S.H. and the Avengers must work together to free Hulk and prevent the destruction of Earth and the cosmos. After A-Bomb rescues Hulk and Leader, the Agents of S.M.A.S.H. and the Avengers gain help from various other heroes when the Supreme Intelligence plans to destroy the Earth.
