= Val Mayerik =

American artist (born 1950)

- Born: March 29, 1950 (age 76) Youngstown, Ohio, U.S.
- Area: Penciller
- Notable works: Howard the Duck, Man-Thing
- Collaborators: Steve Gerber, James Hudnall

Val Mayerik (born March 29, 1950) is an American comic book and commercial artist, best known as co-creator of the satiric character Howard the Duck for Marvel Comics.

== Biography ==
=== Early life and career ===
Val Mayerik was born in Youngstown, Ohio. Upon college graduation, he met and began working as an assistant to Ohio-based comic-book artist Dan Adkins, alongside fellow assistant P. Craig Russell. Through Adkins, who was primarily an inker for Marvel Comics, Mayerik broke into comics that summer as penciler, over Adkins layouts, of the eight-page story "Spell of the Dragon", starring author John Jakes' sword-and-sorcery hero Brak the Barbarian. Published in the horror-fantasy anthology Chamber of Chills # 2 (Jan. 1973), it appeared a month after his first published comics work, the full-length "The Monster of the Monoliths" in Marvel's Conan the Barbarian # 21, which Mayerik and Russell penciled over Barry Windsor-Smith layouts.

Mayerik quickly found more assignments, penciling Marvel's adaptation of H.G. Wells' The Invisible Man, over Adkins layouts, in Supernatural Thrillers # 2 (Feb. 1973); and doing his first full penciling, with writer George Alec Effinger's adaptation of Lin Carter's "Thongor! Warrior of Lost Lemuria" story "Thieves of Zangabal", in Creatures on the Loose # 22 (March 1973).

=== Howard the Duck ===
Mayerik became the regular artist of the swamp-monster feature "Man-Thing" in Fear #13 (April 1973). Six issues later, he and writer Steve Gerber introduced Howard the Duck. Initially a minor supporting character intended only for an issue or two, the anthropomorphic waterfowl — wearing a suit and tie as a parody of cartoon animal ducks, known for his cigar-smoking and his angry, acerbic wit — Howard eventually became the starring character in his own satiric series, penciled first by Frank Brunner and then Gene Colan. The character shortly afterward became a mainstream pop-culture figure.

Mayerik continued to pencil both the "Man-Thing" and "Thongor" series until the former received his own title, for which Mayerik drew the premiere issue (Jan. 1974). While also doing scattered horror/fantasy/science-fiction anthology stories, Mayerik teamed with Gerber on a second series, the Living Mummy, in Supernatural Thrillers, and took over the art on The Frankenstein Monster. With writer Doug Moench, he did a monumental adaptation of Sir Arthur Conan Doyle's Sherlock Holmes novel The Hound of the Baskervilles in the black-and-white magazine Marvel Preview # 5-6 (April & Spring 1976). He also penciled the final six issues of the 20-issue, 1974 to 1977 jungle-lord series Ka-Zar.

Also interested in acting, Mayerik appears in The Demon Lover (1977), a low-budget horror film shot in and around Detroit, Michigan.

=== New York; more than Marvel ===
In early 1977, Mayerik moved to New York City, where he acted off-off-Broadway and found work with artist Neal Adams' Continuity Associates studio. In Fall 1978, Mayerik, Howard Chaykin, Walt Simonson, and Jim Starlin formed Upstart Associates, a shared studio space on West 29th Street in New York City. The membership of the studio changed over time.

During this time, he drew the first Howard the Duck Annual (May 1977) and Howard the Duck #22-23 (March–April 1978). He was also an artist on the Howard the Duck newspaper comic strip in 1977. He co-plotted and co-scripted, in addition to drawing, Howard the Duck #33 (Sept. 1986), the second and last issue of a short-lived series revival coinciding with the release of the movie Howard the Duck. He expanded beyond his prolific Marvel work to draw for Heavy Metal magazine and the Warren Publishing line of black-and-white comics magazines; the latter work included the continuing samurai feature "Young Master", reprints of which appeared as backup stories in Mayerik and writer Larry Hama 1987-1989 Young Master series published by New Comics Group.

Mayerik left New York City in 1981, moving first to Cleveland, Ohio, where he did local TV and film work and regional theater in addition to his art, before settling in Oregon in 1993.

=== Commercial art ===
Mayerik continued to draw for comics through the 1980s and early 1990s, working on series for Eclipse Comics, First Comics, Now Comics, Pacific Comics, and Harvey Pekar's self-published American Splendor, in addition to Marvel, but was segueing toward more of a career in advertising art and in illustration for the games industry, including the roleplaying game companies TSR, Inc. and Wizards of the Coast. As a spin-off of this, he drew the four-issue Acclaim Comics miniseries Magic: The Gathering — The Shadow Mage (July-Oct. 1995).

As of at least 2010, artist Mayerik and writer James Hudnall produce the comic strip Useful Idiots for the political site BigJournalism.com, later a section of Breitbart.

Mayerik has done storyboards and other art for clients ranging from Coca-Cola and Microsoft to the American Indian College Fund and the Oregon Historical Society.

== Bibliography ==
=== Acclaim / Valiant ===
- Dakkon Blackblade on the World of Magic: The Gathering #1 (1996)
- Free-View #1 (1995)
- H.A.R.D. Corps #27-29 (1995)
- Homelands on the World of Magic: The Gathering #1 (1996)
- Magic: the Gathering - The Shadow Mage #1-4 (1995)
- Magic: The Gathering Wayfarer #1-5 (1995-1996)
- Sliders: Darkest Hour #2–3 (1996)
- Timewalker #5 (1995)

=== American Mythology Productions ===
- Florida Man #2 (2022)

=== Braly Image Group Studios ===
- Florida Man #1 (2021)

=== Candle Light Press ===
- Dan Callahan and the Sand Pirates (2014)

=== Checker ===
- The X-Files #1 (2005)

=== Crusade/Marvel ===
- Shi / Daredevil: Honor Thy Mother #1 (1997)

=== Dark Horse ===
- Badger: Zen Pop Funny-Animal Version #1–2 (1994)
- Dark Horse Classics #1 (1996)
- Dark Horse Presents #124 (1997)
- Michael Chabon Presents the Amazing Adventures of the Escapist #1 and 2 (2004)
- Predator: Jungle Tales (1995)

=== DC Comics ===
- DC Special Blue Ribbon Digest #20 (1982)
- Doorway to Nightmare #1 (1978)
- Heroes Against Hunger #1 (1986)
- House of Mystery #280 (1980)
- House of Secrets #153 (1978)
- Jonah Hex #18 (1978)

=== The Delaware Valley Comicart Consortium ===
- Howard the Duck (1977)

=== Devil's Due / 1First Comics ===
- Badger #5 (2016)
- Mix Tape 2016 [Free Comic Book Day] (2016)

=== Eclipse Comics ===
- Destroyer Duck #2-7 (1983)
- Eclipse, the Magazine #2–3 (1981)
- The Masked Man #1 (1984)
- Miracleman: Apocrypha #3 (1992)
- Twisted Tales #9 (1984)

=== First Comics ===
- Crossroads #5 (1988)
- Dreadstar #32-40 (1987-1989)
- First Six Pack #2 (1987)
- Jon Sable, Freelance #52 (1987)
- Sensei #1-4 (1989)

=== Globe Communications ===
- Super Cracked #30 (1986)
- Super Cracked #7 (1993)

=== Harvey Pekar ===
- American Splendor #9-13 (1984-1988)

=== Heavy Metal ===
- Heavy Metal Vol. 1, #10 (1978)
- Heavy Metal Vol. 2, #12 (1979)
- Heavy Metal Vol. 3, #4, 9 (1979-1980)
- Heavy Metal Vol. 20. #3 (1996)

=== IDW ===
- Zombies vs. Robots #1 (2015)

=== Jim Berry ===
- Of Dust and Blood: A Story from the Fight at the Greasy Grass (2016)

=== Major Publications ===
- Cracked #157-159, 174, 176, 177, 180, 182 (1979-1981)
- Cracked Collectors' Edition #40, 50 (1981–1982)
- King-Sized Cracked #18 (1984)

=== Malibu Comics ===
- Bruce Lee #1-6 (1994)

=== Marvel Comics ===
- Amazing Adventure #1 (1988)
- Amazing High Adventure #3 (1986)
- Bizarre Adventures #32 (1982)
- Chamber of Chills #2 (1973)
- The Conan Saga #7, 35, 75 (1987–1993)
- Conan the Barbarian #21, 69, 138–139; Conan Annual #8 (1972–1984)
- Conan the Savage #8 (1996)
- Creatures on the Loose #22–27 (1973–1974)
- Doc Savage #7 (1977)
- Dracula Lives! vol. 2 #1 (1974)
- Fallen Angels #4–6 (1987)
- Fear #13–19 (1973–1974)
- Frankenstein #12–18 (1974–1975)
- Haunt of Horror (1974 series) #1 (1974)
- Howard the Duck #22–23, 33 (1978–1986)
- Howard the Duck Annual #1 (1977)
- Hulk! #10 (1978)
- Iron Man #101 (1977)
- Ka-Zar #15–20 (1976–1977)
- Ka-Zar the Savage #15–19, 21–26 (1982–1983)
- King Conan #15 (1983)
- Legion of Monsters #1 (1975)
- Man-Thing #1–4, 11 (1974)
- Mark Hazzard: Merc #7 (1987)
- Marvel Age (1983 series) #21, 98, Annual #2 (1984–1991)
- Marvel Graphic Novel #11 – Void Indigo (1984)
- The Marvel No-Prize Book #1 (1983)
- Marvel Preview #5–6, 8, 10, 24 (1976–1980)
- The Marvel Saga #17 (1987)
- Marvel Treasury Edition #12 (1976)
- Masters of Terror #2 (1975)
- Micronauts #35 (1981)
- Monsters Unleashed #6–10 (1974–1975)
- The New Mutants #49 (1987)
- Power Pack #30 (1987)
- The Punisher #60–62, 75, 77–79, Annual #5 (1992–1993)
- The Punisher Summer Special #1 (1991)
- The Punisher War Journal #43–44 (1992)
- The Punisher War Zone #23–25 (1995)
- Rampaging Hulk #4–5 (1977)
- The Savage Sword of Conan #22, 32, 74, 84, 91, 94, 104, 115, 143 (1977–1987)
- Savage Tales #5, 8 (1974–1986)
- Sleepwalker #28–29 (1993)
- Stalkers #3–12 (1990)
- Steelgrip Starkey #4–5 (1986–1987)
- Strikeforce: Morituri #23–24, 26–28 (1988–1989)
- Sub-Mariner #56 (1972)
- Supernatural Thrillers #2, 7–14 (1973–1975)
- Toxic Avenger #1–4, 6–8, 10–11 (1991–1992)
- Vampire Tales #5, Annual #1 (1974–1975)
- Void Indigo #1–2 (1984)
- Web of Spider-Man #49 (1989)
- Worlds Unknown #2 (1973)

=== NBM ===
- Of Dust and Blood: The Battle at Little Big Horn (2018)

=== New Comics Group ===
- The Master #2 (1989)
- Young Master #1-9 (1987-1989)

=== Now ===
- The Green Hornet #9 (1992)
- Kato of the Green Hornet II #1 and 2 (1992)

=== Pacific Comics ===
- Alien Worlds #1 and 6 (1982-1984)
- Twisted Tales #2 and 5 (1983)

=== Roger Corman's Cosmic Comics ===
- Bram Stoker's Burial of the Rats #1-3 (1995)

=== Topps ===
- The X-Files: Season One - Squeeze (1997)
- The X-Files: Season One - Space (1998)

=== TwoMorrows Publishing ===
- Comic Book Creator #33 (2024)

=== Warren Publishing ===
- Creepy #105-109, 111, 115-118, 120, 123, 127, 134 (1979-1982)
- Eerie #97, 103, 105, 108, 109, 111, 122, 123 (1978-1981)
- Vampirella #76, 79, 82, 84, 86 (1979-1980)

=== Roleplaying-games ===
==== Books interior art ====
- Conan: Adventures in an Age Undreamed Of (2016, Modiphius Entertainment, inner pages illustrations by Val Mayerik, among others)
- The Shackled City Adventure Path (Dungeons & Dragons): Paizo Publishing, 2005
- Warhammer Fantasy Roleplay, Second Edition (Warhammer FRP): Black Industries, 2005
- Darkness Unleashed (Cartoon Action Hour): Z-Man Games, 2004
- Waves of Blood (7th Sea): Alderac Entertainment, 2001
- Dune: Chronicles of the Imperium: Last Unicorn Games, 2000
- Otosan Uchi (Legend of the Five Rings): Alderac Entertainment, 2000
- Domains of Dread (Ravenloft): TSR, 1997
- Back for Seconds (Feng Shui): Daedalus Games, 1996
- Castles & Ruins (Rolemaster): Iron Crown Enterprises, 1996
- Requiem: The Grim Harvest (Ravenloft): TSR, 1996

==== Chip art ====
- Clout Fantasy Hidden City Games, 2005

==== Card art ====
- Magic: The Gathering, 9th Ed.: Wizards of the Coast, 2005
- Mirrodin (Magic: The Gathering): Wizards of the Coast, 2003
