= Miracleman: Apocrypha =

Comic book series

- The cover to the Miracleman: Apocrypha collected edition, art by Mark Buckingham.

Publication information
- Publisher: Eclipse Comics
- Schedule: Monthly
- Format: Anthology
- Publication date: November 1991-February 1992
- No. of issues: 3

Creative team
- Written by: Neil Gaiman; Steve Moore; James Robinson; Sarah Byam; Matt Wagner; Kurt Busiek; Broderick Macaraeg; Dick Foreman; Fred Schiller; Steven Grant
- Artist(s): Mark Buckingham; Stan Woch; Kelley Jones; Christopher Schenck; Stefan Petrucha; Alex Ross; Val Mayerik; Darick Robertson; Melinda Gebbie
- Penciller: Alan Smith
- Inker: Pete Williamson
- Letterer: Wayne Truman
- Colorist: Digital Chameleon
- Editor: Valerie Jones

Collected editions
- Miracleman: The Apocrypha: ISBN 1560601892

Miracleman: Apocrypha was an American superhero limited series anthology comic book, published by Eclipse Comics between 1991 and 1992. It was a spin-off of Eclipse's Miracleman series, and ran for three issues.

In order to avoid clashing with the main title's carefully plotted continuity the mini-series consisted of stories within a story, with a framing sequence by Miracleman creative team Neil Gaiman and Mark Buckingham establishing that the various stories were the content of comic books in the library of Olympus, the huge palace inhabited by the title character and his paramour Miraclewoman.

== Creation ==
As well as the commercial benefit of another title based on Eclipse's most popular character, a key motivation for the series was the number of comics creators who were expressing interest in working on Miracleman. As Gaiman and Buckingham had three six-issue arcs planned for the main title they decided on the Apocrypha format to make use of this enthusiasm without derailing their plans, with Gaiman stating he "loved the idea doing a book of imaginary stories". They produced 10 pages of framing material which bookended each of the three issues. Buckingham also produced covers for the series; the cover to Miracleman: Apocrypha #2 was a direct homage to John Byrne's cover for The Man of Steel #1, while that of the third issue is based on that of Marvel Comics' Fantastic Four #5 by Jack Kirby, featuring near-identical dialogue. Each story in the anthology was between six and ten pages long. Art Adams was originally announced as a contributor but ultimately did not work on the series.

== Publishing history ==
The first issue was dated November 1991; after a month's delay the second and third issues followed in the first two months of 1992. In December of the same year Eclipse issued a trade paperback collection of the series.

While the full series has yet to be reprinted by Marvel Comics since they acquired the Miracleman licence, material from the framing sequence was updated and edited to again be used to introduce imaginary stories for Miracleman #0.

== Contents ==
- "The Library of Olympus:" (written by Neil Gaiman and illustrated by Mark Buckingham)

Since Miracleman took control of the world the comic industry has undergone a considerable shift – superheroes such as Superman, Batman, Spider-Man and the X-Men have all left publication, unable to compete with real-world superhumans. Instead most comics revolve around Miracleman, his allies, his enemies and his mythos. Feeling disconnected from the human race, he reads a selection of those held in the Library of Olympus. After doing so he is none the wiser, and Miraclewoman gently chides him, noting that comic books got them into this mess in the first place – a reference to Gargunza being inspired to create them after reading an issue of Captain Marvel Adventures. (Note: Itself a meta-reference to the real-world origins of the characters in 1954.)

=== Comic book stories ===
- "Miracleman and the Magic Monsters" (Note: Listed in the comic's credits as "Miracleman and the Magic Pen".) (written by Steve Moore and illustrated by Stan Woch)

Artist Peter Penman buys a pen from a mysterious shop in a Dorset village. He later discovers that the pen belonged to Merlin and that any drawings made with the pen come to life. He attempts to use monsters created with the pen to blackmail the government for one million pounds. Word reaches the offices of the Daily Bugle, and Micky Moran turns into Miracleman to investigate. Finding himself passing through the illusory monsters he instead locates Penman and uses the pen to draw a version of himself, who rounds up the creatures and drops them on an abandoned moon. The real Miracleman delivers Penman to prison, and plans drop the pen on Pluto to keep it out of harm's way.

- "The Rascal Prince" (written by James Robinson and illustrated by Kelley Jones)

A hormonal 11-year old Johnny Bates realises the power he has, especially now he is becoming interested in women, and his dark side is awakened when he kills a couple of witnesses who might have given away his survival. Transforming into Kid Miracleman, he sets his sights on a random passer-by, the 19-year old Angela O'Donnell. While a tract read by a cult preaches the encounter as a charming juvenile romance it instead consists of him brutally raping and murdering her. Exhilarated, he ponders what he will do next.

- "The Scrapbook" (written by Sarah Byam, illustrated by Norm Breyfogle)

Despite warnings from Miraclewoman, Miracleman looks through a taunting photo-album created to taunt him by Doctor Gargunza. Its contents depict Mike Moran living happily in a normal life with a pregnant Liz and an unpowered Winter, only for a family holiday to America to be spoilt when an armed robbery shows his alter-ego was never far away. As the album ends with Liz and Winter walking out on him, a downhearted Miracleman tells Miraclewoman he misses them.

- "Limbo" (written and illustrated by Matt Wagner)

Miracleman and Mors meet on the ramparts of Olympus and discuss their latest research – Miracleman is close to finding a cure for aging, while Mors is reaching further and wider in his quest to resurrect the dead – working on bats. The pair plan to meet again the same time the following day, with the words "Same Miracle-Time, Same Miracle-Channel".

- "Prodigal" (written by Kurt Busiek, illustrated by Christopher Schenk)

At a biblical survivalist compound that believes the new world of Miracleman is evil, a young boy called Abstinence Merridew sneaks away and visits the city. There he finds a utopia compared to the privations of home, and falls in love with a girl called Taina. However he ultimately finds it hollow, and returns to the settlement – only to be shot as he approaches.

- "Stray Thoughts" (written by Broderick Macaraeg, illustrated by Stefan Petrucha)

Miraclewoman invites a girl called Penny to Olympus after she writes a letter wishing she could visit the palace. The pair play games, and Miraclewoman shows Penny her vast number of robot doubles. Penny accidentally releases them all into the world, causing chaos. She and Miraclewoman round them up but Penny is seemingly hit and killed by shrapnel. However, it is revealed the girl was a robot all along.

- "The Janitor" (written by Dick Foreman, illustrated by Alan Smith and Pete Williamson)

Unable to adapt to life without work, a Londoner volunteers to work as a cleaner at Olympus, five days a week, 8am to 5pm. He is unfazed by features such as an anti-matter portal containing the sinister Antijanitor an requiring a space suit to clean a giant, naked statue of Miraclewoman, instead being more interested in his tea breaks. Walking home he is finally amazed when he sees a vintage running Ford Prefect, something he declares a miracle.

- "Wishing on a Star" (story by Steve Moore, illustrated by Alex Ross)

Three children called Lucy, Pete and Roy see a shooting star and make a wish. The star is Miracleman, who is heading to Cape Canaveral. There he finds former NASA astronaut Cal Shumaker, bitter at the ending of the space programme since the superhumans made it irrelevant. To help him Miracleman prepares a Space Shuttle for launch, though Cal will only let him perform duties that other support staff would have, and swears him to not involve himself in the actual launch. He follows the shuttle into orbit, where Cal insists on pushing on to Mars. However, he loses control of the shuttle and refuses to let Miracleman intervene. As the shuttle burns up it is mistaken for another shooting star by Lucy, Pete and Roy.

- "A Bright and Sunny Day" (story by Fred Schiller, illustrated by Val Mayerik)

Kid Miracleman investigates an explosion at Licten Labs. He finds Professor Hieronimus Winston, a particle physicist who was attempting to accelerate how fast human bodies could heal. However, the accident has instead left him aging a year every minute. Not knowing what to do, Kid Miracleman unsuccessfully attempts to contact Miracleman and is forced to settle for comforting the Professor. Winston dies before Miracleman arrives, leaving Kid Miracleman's faith in his mentor shaken.

- "Gospel" (story by Steven Grant, illustrated by Darick Robertson)

A preacher called Tamblyn preaches a radical doctrine in a survivalist town. He and the other residents believe that Miracleman had sold the planet out to his alien allies and planned to enslave humanity, with Kid Miracleman attempting to stop him. Despite the unflinching belief of the small community Tamblyn's tract is rejected from consideration for the Library of Olympus, and three years later he dies. Following a crop failure the townspeople are left with no choice but to return to the rest of society – but still fervently believing in Tamblyn's teaching.

== Reception ==
Reviewing Miracleman: Apocrypha #1 for Amazing Heroes, Matthew Bradshaw rated the issue 3 out of 5 and called it a mixed bag, praising "Limbo" and to a lesser extent "The Rascal Prince" but noting that "The Scrapbook" was "boring" and that Stan Woch's artwork was too polished to make "Miracleman and the Magic Monsters" the intended spoof of the character's fifties adventures. Jason Sacks upgraded it to 3.5 out of 5 the following month, calling it "a wonderful package".

The third issue contained a letters page, with one reader expressing concern that "The Rascal Prince" might have been read by children; the histrionic editorial response saw a second reader write in and accuse Eclipse of double-standards over featuring a cover-warning for Miracleman #9 (featuring the birth of Miracleman's daughter) and not for the more horrific content of Miracleman: Apocrypha #1, which then-editor Andy Willett struggled to answer.

Nothing But Comics was positive in a retrospective review, noting that "this diverse collection of stories succeed in broadening the canvas of Miracleman’s world." However, re-reading the series as part of a read-through of Eclipse's material, Lars Ingebrigtsen was less impressed, questioned whether the creators involved had known their work would be packaged as imaginary stories, and declared "The Rascal Prince" in particular a "shit burger".

=== Awards ===
The series was awarded the title of Best Anthology Series at the 1992 Compuserve Comics and Animation Forum's Awards.

== Collected Editions ==
Title	ISBN	Release date	Contents
Miracleman: Apocrypha	1560601892	1992	Contains Miracleman: Apocrypha #1-3
