= Topaz (Marvel Comics) =

Marvel Comics fictional character

- Topaz (left) alongside Satana Hellstrom (middle) and Jennifer Kale (right). Cover of Witches #4 (July 2004). Art by Mike Deodato.

Publication information
- Publisher: Marvel Comics
- First appearance: Werewolf By Night #13 (January 1974)
- Created by: Marv Wolfman (writer); Mike Ploog (artist)

In-story information
- Alter ego: Unknown
- Species: Human
- Team affiliations: Witches
- Partnerships: Doctor Strange; Jack Russell
- Notable aliases: Topaz
- Abilities: Demonic magic; Telekinesis; Telepathy; Empathy

Topaz is a character appearing in American comic books published by Marvel Comics. Created by writer Marv Wolfman and artist Mike Ploog, the character first appeared in Werewolf By Night #13 (1974). Topaz is a witch who belongs to a coven alongside Jennifer Kale and Satana Hellstrom.

== Publication history ==
=== Concept and creation ===
Comic book artist Mike Deodato used his wife as a reference to depict Topaz in the 2004 Witches series.

=== 1970s ===
Topaz debuted in Werewolf By Night #13 (1974), and was created by Marv Wolfman and Mike Ploog. She appeared in the 1972 Tomb of Dracula series. She appeared as a supporting character and love interest of Jack Russell in the 1974 Giant-Size Werewolf By Night series. She appeared as a recurring supporting character of Doctor Strange in the 1974 Doctor Strange series.

=== 1980-1990s ===
Topaz appeared in the 1987 Strange Tales series, the 1990 Ghost Rider series, the 1993 Spider-Man Unlimited series, the 1999 Doctor Strange series, and the Dr. Strange: Flight of Bones one-shot.

=== 2000s ===
Topaz appeared as one of the three main characters in the 2004 Witches series. She appeared in the 2021 Witches Unleashed one-shot.

== Fictional character biography ==
The character's origins and real name are unknown, even to herself. As a child, Topaz was found by the sorcerer Taboo, who was living in an Indian prison camp at the time. Wishing to use her magical abilities to his own ends, Taboo adopted her and named her Topaz. He used her as a familiar and taught her several spells. Years later, Taboo forces Topaz to use her powers to control Jack Russell. Cast out by Taboo after refusing to kill Russell, Topaz helps Russell learn to control his werewolf powers, and becomes his lover.

After Topaz destroys Mephisto, Mephisto's minions trap her in another dimension with a spell that would remove a portion of her soul and rob her of her empathic powers if she ever leaves the realm. Later, Mephisto is revealed to be alive. After he is destroyed by Franklin Richards, Topaz is freed from her imprisonment. Her soul is eventually restored by Doctor Strange and Urthona.

Topaz has a quiet life for a while, running a bar called the Voodoo Lounge. However, once Dormammu learns her whereabouts, he seeks revenge and had one of his agents enslave her. Once again, Strange comes to Topaz's rescue. Topaz later helps Doctor Strange in yet another battle, joining forces with Jennifer Kale and Satana against the Hellphyr force and fighting zombies and demons. After winning this battle, Topaz founds the group known as the Witches in order to protect the world from mystical threats and prevent would-be thieves from stealing the Kale family's Book of Shadows.

== Powers and abilities ==
Topaz possesses mystic abilities, including empathy, telepathy, and telekinesis. She can magnify or diminish emotions. She is able to infuse life energy, and heal injures. Topaz can serve as a familiar to other sorcerers, focusing and magnifying their abilities. She can absorb pain, suffering, hatred, and fear from others into herself.
