= Legion of Monsters =

Comic book superhero teams

Publication information
- Publisher: Marvel Comics
- First appearance: Marvel Premiere #28 (February 1976)
- Created by: Bill Mantlo; Frank Robbins; Steve Gan

In-story information
- Base(s): Monster Metropolis
- Member(s): Man-Thing; Manphibian; Morbius, the Living Vampire; N'Kantu, the Living Mummy; Werewolf by Night

Legion of Monsters is the name of different superhero teams appearing in American comic books published by Marvel Comics.

== Publication history ==
The Legion of Monsters first appeared in Marvel Comics chronology in Marvel Premiere #28 (February 1976) and was created by Bill Mantlo, Frank Robbins, and Steve Gan.

Unrelated to the team, The Legion of Monsters was also used as a banner name for two magazines, The Legion of Monsters #1 (September 1975) and Marvel Preview #8 (September 1976), both of which featured multiple stories starring some of Marvel's monster characters.

== Fictional team biography ==
=== Legion of Monsters (1976) ===
The first version of the Legion of Monsters was united by chance to investigate the appearance of a strange being called The Starseed. Although the being was benevolent, Morbius, the Living Vampire and the Werewolf by Night were overcome by their hungers and attacked it. The Ghost Rider intervened, as the Starseed was unable to overcome his fear of the Man-Thing and was burned by it. The dying Starseed attempted to cure the Legion of their monstrous forms but was too weak and died minutes later. Tired of fighting, and disappointed in their actions, the team split up, although they barely acknowledged even being a team in the first place.

=== Legion of Monsters (2010) ===
A new version of the Legion of Monsters was formed by Morbius the Living Vampire, the Werewolf by Night, and the Man-Thing. They are joined by N'Kantu, the Living Mummy and the Manphibian. They came together to protect monsters from the Hunter of Monster Special Forces and send the monsters into the Morlock Tunnels to the Monster Metropolis. They first appeared when the Moloids who work for the Man-Thing find the decapitated parts of the Punisher (who was sliced up by Wolverine's son Daken) and Morbius reassembles him as FrankenCastle. The Punisher joins up with the Legion of Monsters to help protect the Monster Metropolis from the Hunter of Monster Special Forces where FrankenCastle fights the Hunter of Monster Special Forces' leader, Robert Hellsgaard.

The Werewolf by Night and N'Kantu the Living Mummy are shown attempting to arrest the Dimensional Man for feeding on the life force of fellow monsters, before being joined by Morbius the living vampire and Manphibian, who ultimately work together to capture him. Elsa Bloodstone is teleported to Monster Metropolis after chasing a monster that's been killing teenagers. When Morbius discovers that the monster is dead, Elsa is arrested and held in custody while he performs an autopsy on its body. It is later revealed that it was actually corrupted with evil energies that originated from within Morbius himself.

The Legion of Monsters later help the Red Hulk overcome the panicked monsters at the time when the Red Hulk had journeyed to the Monster Metropolis. With the help of Doctor Strange, the Red Hulk and the Legion of Monsters discover that the spirit that has been bothering the Red Hulk is the insane evil side of Doc Samson (referred to as Dark Samson) which has not passed into the next life. Using a ghost entrapment device, the Red Hulk and the Legion of Monsters were able destroy the Dark Samson spirit by ripping the Dark Samson spirit in half. The Red Hulk and the Legion of Monsters did a toast to honor Doc Samson after that.

== Members ==
=== Legion of Monsters (1976) ===
- Ghost Rider - Leader
- Man-Thing
- Morbius, the Living Vampire
- Werewolf by Night

=== Legion of Monsters (2010) ===
- Morbius, the Living Vampire - Leader
- Werewolf by Night
- Elsa Bloodstone
- Frankenstein
- FrankenCastle - A Frankenstein version of Punisher.
- Manphibian
- Man-Thing
- N'Kantu, the Living Mummy
- Satana
- Shiklah
- Simon Garth, the Zombie

== In other media ==
- The Legion of Monsters makes a cameo appearance in Jill Valentine's ending in Marvel vs. Capcom 3: Fate of Two Worlds.
- Morbius, N'Kantu the Living Mummy, and Man-Thing appear in Lego Marvel Super Heroes 2.

== Collected editions ==
| Title | Material collected | Published date | ISBN |
|---|---|---|---|
| Decades: Marvel in the 70s - Legion of Monsters | Legion of Monsters (vol. 1) #1; Marvel Preview #8; Marvel Premiere #28; Marvel Spotlight #2, 5; Frankenstein #1; Tomb of Dracula #10; material from Savage Tales #1 | April 2019 | 978-1302916619 |
| Legion Of Monsters | Legion of Monsters: Werewolf by Night, Legion of Monsters: Morbius, Legion of Monsters: Man-Thing, Legion of Monsters: Satana | November 2007 | 978-0785127543 |
| Legion of Monsters | Legion of Monsters (vol. 2) #1-4 | April 2012 | 978-0785140573 |
| Bloodstone & The Legion Of Monsters | Legion of Monsters (vol. 2) #1-4 and Bloodstone #1-4, Astonishing Tales: Boom Boom and Elsa, Marvel Presents #1-2, Marvel Monsters: From the Files of Ulysses Bloodstone & The Monster Hunters; material from Marvel Assistant-Sized Spectacular #2, Girl Comics #2 | September 2017 | 978-1302908027 |
