= Daimon Hellstrom =

Character from Marvel Comics

- Daimon Hellstrom as seen in Savage Avengers Annual #1 (October 2019). Art by Mike Deodato Jr.

Publication information
- Publisher: Marvel Comics
- First appearance: Ghost Rider #1 (September 1973)
- Created by: Roy Thomas; Gary Friedrich; Herb Trimpe

In-story information
- Alter ego: Daimon Hellstrom
- Species: Human/demon hybrid
- Team affiliations: Defenders; God Squad; Hellfire Club; Masters of Evil; Midnight Sons; Shadow Hunters; S.H.I.E.L.D. Paranormal Containment Unit; Strange Academy
- Notable aliases: The Son of Satan; Hellstorm
- Abilities: Dark magic user Fire projection Ability to heal others Peak human physical capabilities

Daimon Hellstrom, also known as the Son of Satan and Hellstorm, is a fictional character appearing in American comic books published by Marvel Comics.

Daimon made his live action debut in the television series Helstrom, portrayed by Tom Austen.

== Publication history ==
Daimon Hellstrom in the cover of Marvel Spotlight #13 (January 1974), art by John Romita Sr.

Encouraged by the success of the titles Ghost Rider (vol. 2) and The Tomb of Dracula, both of which starred occult characters, Stan Lee proposed a series starring Satan, to be titled The Mark of Satan. Editor Roy Thomas had reservations about this idea and suggested a series focusing on the son of Satan instead (due to an oversight, "The Mark of Satan" is mentioned in a blurb in Ghost Rider (vol. 2) #1). According to Thomas, Lee approved of the idea, and Gary Friedrich and Herb Trimpe were assigned the task of designing the character. However, Trimpe denies this, claiming Friedrich alone designed Daimon Hellstrom and only brought him in as artist after the character was fully realized. Thomas has said he later realized that a 1960s fanzine character created by his friend Biljo White had looked very similar. Thomas recalled in 2001:

"... I realized that name and basic concept had been a fanzine comic by a friend of mine, Biljo White, back in the early '60s! He wound up looking even looking a lot like Biljo's character, by sheer coincidence, because I don't think Herb Trimpe and Gary Friedrich, who did the actual story, ever saw him and I don't think I described it much. The branded chest, a trident, and so forth... I think it just came out looking almost identical. I explained it to Biljo, and he understood, but it was really weird, because if you look at his old fanzine, it's almost the same character!"

The character Daimon Hellstrom first appeared in Ghost Rider (vol. 2) #1–2 (Sept. 1973 – Oct. 1973), then was spun off into a feature, "The Son of Satan", in Marvel Spotlight #12–24 (Oct. 1973 – Oct. 1975). During the "Son of Satan" run, Marvel Spotlight was a controversial series, with numerous readers writing to object to the depictions of Satanism and Wicca as being either inaccurate or furthering the cause of evil. Nonetheless, sales were strong, prompting Marvel to launch the character into his own series, The Son of Satan, written by John Warner. The character's success faded soon after the series launch, and The Son of Satan was cancelled with issue #7, though an unused fill-in was published as The Son of Satan #8 (Feb. 1977).

Hellstrom then became a recurring character in The Defenders, Steve Gerber having added the character to the team during the time he was writing the "Son of Satan" feature in Marvel Spotlight, and Hellstrom continued to appear in Defenders following the cancellation of Marvel Spotlight. One of the later writers on Defenders, J. M. DeMatteis, featured a number of subplots focused on Daimon Hellstrom, commenting that he "was absolutely my favorite character. Characters like Son of Satan are a wonderful metaphor for what we all contain, good and evil, high and low aspirations. He's literally the son of the Devil, trying not to be what his father is. For a writer like me, how can you not feast on that?" Hellstrom's story reaches a resolution of sorts in The Defenders #120–121 (June–July 1983), as Hellstrom is freed from his Satanic heritage and marries his teammate Patsy Walker (Hellcat).

In 1993, he received his own series once more with Hellstorm: Prince of Lies. As suggested by the title, his surname was spelled "Hellstorm" during this series, the character explicitly choosing to change it from "Hellstrom" in issues #1 and 2. Rafael Nieves wrote the first four issues, Len Kaminski took over as scripter until issue #11, and Warren Ellis then took over as writer until the series' cancellation with issue #21. In 2019, the character joined a team consisting of Blade the Vampire Slayer, Angela, the Winter Soldier, Spider-Woman, Wiccan, and Monica Rambeau in Strikeforce.

== Fictional character biography ==
Daimon Hellstrom was born in the fictional town of Greentown, Massachusetts. He is the son of Satan and a mortal woman named Victoria Wingate (his father was later retconned to be the demon Marduk Kurios). Daimon and his younger sister, Satana, were trained by their father in the art of magic, tapping into the power granted them by their dark heritage. However, while Satana embraced her heritage, Daimon clung to his humanity. When their mother discovered who her husband really was, she was driven insane. Daimon and Satana were separated and put in different homes after their mother was institutionalized and their father banished back to Hell. Daimon grew up in a Jesuit-run orphanage, never hearing a word from his father or sister. He became a professor of anthropology at St. Louis University. He then set himself up as an occult investigator and defender of humanity, battling dark arcane forces — primarily those of his father — under the name of the "Son of Satan", as a demonologist and exorcist.

In his first appearance, Daimon battled Satan and the Witch-Woman alongside the Ghost Rider. Soon after that, he began a long association with the Defenders by helping them battle Asmodeus (the leader of the Sons of Satannish) and Satannish himself. He also helped the Defenders battle the third incarnation of the Sons of the Serpent. He then encountered Satana for the first time as an adult.

After Steve Gerber ceased writing the book, Hellstrom began working at the University of the District of Columbia Parapsychology Department, where he had a friendship with Seripha Thames, a female professor who was a Wiccan. Following these events, he was rarely seen for a while. One of his few recorded adventures during this time was again with the Defenders, battling the Hulk. He returned to a more active role when he became involved with the Defenders yet again, this time becoming an active member of the group. He worked with the team to battle the Six-Fingered Hand, and was taken to Hell by Satan. He was subsequently expelled from Hell by Satan and rejoined the Defenders. Hellstrom later married his teammate Patsy Walker, also known as Hellcat.

Alongside Hellcat and the West Coast Avengers, he later battled Master Pandemonium, Allatou, and the Cat People. He later exorcised Lincoln Slade's spirit from Hamilton Slade's body. Alongside the West Coast Avengers again, he battled Seth's forces. Daimon and Patsy retired from adventuring and Daimon went on a personal quest for meaning. He traveled to a monastery where the Miracle Man had taken refuge. When the Miracle Man stole Daimon's "Darksoul", Daimon discovered that he was human, but he was also dying. Patsy eventually used a dark magic book in Daimon's possession titled the Grimorum Verum to summon "Satan" and pleaded for him to save Daimon's life. However, to do this, Daimon had to regain his Darksoul and once again become the "Son of Satan". Daimon was re-imbued with his essence, but upon witnessing Daimon's "true face" of evil, Patsy went insane. Daimon kept her away from prying eyes in his estate at Fire Lake, where she spent most days either asleep or babbling seemingly randomly. She would remain there until one day she regained enough sanity to weep for having brought back such evil into the world, and committed suicide with the aid of Deathurge. Now calling himself "Hellstorm", Daimon ultimately discovered a way to finally defeat his father. Daimon discovered his father's secret true name – Marduk Kurios – and used the power of this knowledge to finally kill him. Daimon then became the new "Satan", ruling over his father's realm of Hell. (Note: Told via flashback in Hellstorm: Prince of Lies #16) He later used this power to allow Hawkeye and the Thunderbolts to resurrect Patsy from the dead.

In the three-issue miniseries Hellcat, Daimon told his wife that he was never truly the son of Marduk Kurios; his true father was Satannish, who was himself the son of the Dread Dormammu. Daimon claimed he had been fathered as part of a plot to take control of the various "Hell" dimensions. These claims, however, contradicted Hellstorm's established history. It has since been revealed that Hellstorm was deliberately lying to Patsy when he made these claims; his love for Patsy led him to push her away in the hopes that she would be happier without him. Hellstorm used this claim to assume control over Satannish's realm and inherit Dormammu's right to rule as designated by the powerful "Flames of Faltine". However, without either Satannish or Dormammu backing Daimon, Mephisto was able to gain control of the vast majority of "Hell". Daimon was recruited by Kyle Richmond for the Defenders as part of the Fifty States Initiative. Working outside of the Initiative, this team was later forcibly disbanded by H.A.M.M.E.R. (Note: As revealed in Marvel Zombies 4 #1) Daimon was then brought to A.R.M.O.R. to join the Midnight Sons in facing an interdimensional zombie threat. The Midnight Sons headed to Taino to contain the zombie virus, but ended up in a battle with the Hood's forces. During the course of the outbreak on the island, Dormammu possessed fellow member Jennifer Kale, though Daimon exorcised him from her. The mission ended up a success, though the zombie Deadpool's head escaped. He was sought out by Doctor Strange as a potential claimant of the title of Sorcerer Supreme; however, he was attacked by the Hood first, who was attacking potential magic users who could also claim the title and, helped by him and Brother Voodoo (now going by Doctor Voodoo as the new Sorcerer Supreme), they managed to banish Dormammu, leaving the Hood powerless for a while. Sometime around the Dark Reign, Hellstrom, after being informed by a Satanist priest of the existence of the Antichrist, vowed to slay the boy and, joining once more with his former girlfriend Jaine Cutter, rescued the Ghost Rider from the renegade angel Zadkiel's forces, and eventually the united Ghost Riders from all of history were able to reclaim Heaven, overthrow Zadkiel, and triumph over the forces Satan had unleashed against them.

During the Chaos War story line, Hellstrom rose from the pits of Hell itself to inform the newly assembled "God Squad" that his father's fiery realm had fallen to the hordes of Amatsu-Mikaboshi and that all the dead souls of the Underworld were now under his thrall. Hellstrom joined forces with the God Squad and pitted his demonic powers against those of the enslaved Zeus, Hera and Ares, to little avail, and later journeyed with them in a last desperate attempt to seal Mikaboshi in Yomi.

In the series Avengers Undercover, Daimon Hellstrom appears as a member of the Masters of Evil. When Cullen Bloodstone and the other surviving heroes from the series Avengers Arena infiltrate Bagalia, Hellstrom helps Bloodstone to control his Glartrox form. When the heroes are apprehended by S.H.I.E.L.D., Hellstrom rescues them and returns them to Bagalia, where Helmut Zemo invites them into the Masters of Evil.

Hellstrom later appeared as a teacher of Strange Academy, where he teaches Inferno alongside Magik.

== Powers and abilities ==
As a ruler of a realm of Hell, Hellstrom commands virtually unlimited power in his own dimension. He is able to sense the presence of the supernatural and travel between dimensions. Hellstrom can project mystic energy in the form of "soulfire" (also called "hellfire") from his trident, directly affecting the soul and causing excruciating pain to the target. He can use soulfire for various other effects, including flight and physical transformations.

As the Son of Satan, Hellstrom possesses supernatural powers derived from his "Darksoul", a demonic counterpart to his human soul, which physically manifests as a pentagram-shaped birthmark on his chest. Hellstrom wields a trident made of netharanium, a "psychosensitive" metal found only in Satan's realm. The trident is a medium through which magical energies, such as Hellstrom's soulfire, could be amplified and projected. By projecting the soulfire through the trident, Hellstrom can gain enough thrust to levitate for short periods of time. He also used a fiery chariot drawn by three bat-winged demonic horses named Amon, Hecate and Set. Hellstrom is an expert in demonology, and a highly experienced exorcist with some knowledge of mystic rites. He has an advanced degree in theology, and is self-taught in demonology.

== Other versions ==
=== King Thor ===
An alternate universe version of Daimon Hellstrom from Earth-14412 appears in King Thor. This version is one of the few survivors of humanity's destruction at the hands of Loki and succeeded Doctor Strange as Sorcerer Supreme.

=== Marvel Mangaverse ===
An alternate universe version of Daimon Hellstrom from Earth-2301 appears in Marvel Mangaverse: Ghost Riders #1. This version is the brother of Johnny Blaze, who derives his power from him.

=== MAX ===
Science fiction writer Alexander Irvine wrote the five-issue miniseries Hellstorm: Son of Satan, starring Hellstrom as a hero in post-Hurricane Katrina New Orleans for the MAX imprint, Marvel's mature readers line.

=== Ultimate Marvel ===
The unpowered Ultimate Marvel version of Daimon Hellstrom, art by Bryan Hitch

An alternate universe version of Daimon Hellstrom from Earth-1610 appears in the Ultimate Marvel universe. This version is a member of the Defenders and the Ultimates who sports a Gothic appearance and was given powers by Loki.

=== What If ===
An alternate universe version of Daimon Hellstrom appears in What If #17. This version was forced to kill Johnny Blaze after Blaze made a pact with Satan, which allowed Satan to possess him.

== Reception ==
Daimon Hellstrom was ranked #12 on a listing of Marvel Comics' monster characters in 2015 by Den of Geek.

== Collected editions ==
Title	Material collected	Published date	ISBN
The Son of Satan Classic	Ghost Rider (vol. 2) #1–2, Marvel Spotlight #12–24, Marvel Team-Up #32, The Son of Satan #1–8, Marvel Two-in-One #14	November 2016	978-1302901042
Hellstrom: Evil Origins	Ghost Rider (vol. 2) #1–2, Marvel Spotlight #12–13, 24; The Son of Satan #8; The Defenders #92, 120–121	August 2020	978-1302925161
Hellstorm: Son of Satan - Equinox	Hellstorm: Son of Satan #1–5	June 2007	978-0785123873
Hellstorm: Prince of Lies	Hellstorm: Prince of Lies #1–11	October 2020	978-1302925192
Hellstorm by Warren Ellis	Hellstorm: Prince of Lies #12–21	November 2020	978-1302926748
Hellstorm by Warren Ellis Omnibus	Hellstorm: Prince of Lies #12–21; Druid #1–4	October 2018	978-1302913243

== In other media ==
=== Television ===
Daimon Helstrom appears in Helstrom, portrayed by Tom Austen. This version is an ethics professor at Oregon's Gateway University who moonlights as an exorcist. In his battle against a hidden world, Helstrom is determined to root out demons, including his father, as they arise.

=== Video games ===
- Daimon Hellstrom appears as a boss and an unlockable playable character in Marvel Avengers Alliance. He is later transformed into one of the Worthy as Angrir, Breaker of Souls.
- Daimon Hellstorm appears as an unlockable playable character in Marvel Future Fight.
