= Satana (Marvel Comics) =

- Satana (left) with the Ghost Rider (right) on the cover of The Supernaturals Tour Book (August 1998). Art by Ivan Reis and Wellington Dias.

Publication information
- Publisher: Marvel Comics
- First appearance: Vampire Tales #2 (October 1973)
- Created by: Roy Thomas; John Romita Sr.

In-story information
- Alter ego: Satana Hellstrom
- Species: Human/demon hybrid (succubus)
- Team affiliations: The Avengers of the Supernatural; Nick Fury's Howling Commandos; The Legion of Monsters; Masters of Evil West Coast; The Thunderbolts; The Witches
- Notable aliases: The Devil's Daughter; Judith Camber; Melissa Ramos
- Abilities: Demon physiology granting superhuman strength and durability; Life force absorption increasing her abilities and magical powers; Gains strength by touching weapons that killed people; Fire manipulation; Teleportation; Mind control; Flight

Satana Hellstrom (/seɪˈtænə/) is a fictional character appearing in American comic books published by Marvel Comics. Created by Roy Thomas and John Romita Sr., she first appeared in Vampire Tales #2 (October 1973). Satana belongs to the species of magical beings called demons, who are born with supernatural abilities, as a human-demon hybrid. She is the younger sister of Daimon Hellstrom and the daughter of Marduk Kurios.

Satana, renamed Ana, made her live action debut in the television series Helstrom, played by Sydney Lemmon.

== Publication history ==
Satana was created by Roy Thomas and John Romita Sr., and made her debut in Vampire Tales #2 (cover dated October 1973), one of a number of black-and-white magazines Marvel was producing for parent company Magazine Management at the time. The strip was a brief twist-in-the-tale teaser – a sinister, ragged thug stalks a young woman through city back alleys before cornering her against a wall – only for her to harvest his soul, and reveal herself as "Satana...the Devil's Daughter!". The following issue she graduated to a longer feature – "Satana, the Devil's Daughter" – written by Gerry Conway, with art from Esteban Maroto. Satana then jumped to another of Marvel's black-and-white magazines, The Haunt of Horror (vol. 2), which featured a prose story by Conway (illustrated by Pablo Marcos in issue #2; both a Tony Isabella/Enrique Romero strip and a Chris Claremont text piece (illustrated by Pat Broderick) in issue #4 and a Claremont-written strip drawn by George Evans. However, The Haunt of Horror (vol. 2) was cancelled with issue #5 at the start of 1975 as Marvel drastically reorganized their black-and-white magazines, cancelling the horror titles. This would lead to Satana making only a scattered handful of appearances over the next few years.

After a brief flashback in her brother's Son of Satan feature in Marvel Spotlight #13, the character would then make her color debut in Marvel Premiere #27 (December 1975). While this followed up from the cliffhanger ending of Claremont's story in The Haunt of Horror (vol. 2) #5, the format of Marvel Premiere meant Satana's adventures now had to adhere to the Comics Code Authority; as a result a reprint of her debut adventure as a back-up to the 15-page main feature was clumsily modified to tone down the implication that Satana's victim in the story was about to rape her. The art for the main strip was credited to "the Tribe", a Marvel house name for when multiple artists had chipped in on a troubled issue. The issue was presumably not a success; when the character next appeared it was back in black-and-white, in the all-genre Marvel Preview #7 (summer 1976), featuring a vivid painted cover by Bob Larkin. The magazine contained two Satana strips written by Claremont with art from Vicente Alcazar, as well as a prose story. Another long drought followed before the character returned on the last page of Marvel Team-Up #80 (April 1979), presaging a cover-billed adventure with Spider-Man, Doctor Strange and Clea the following month. However, Satana's chances of future appearances were scrapped when she was killed off at the end of Marvel Team-Up #81 (May 1979).

Satana would stay dead until 1994, when after a few spectral appearances she was resurrected by Warren Ellis and Leonardo Manco in Hellstorm: Prince of Lies #20. However, only one further issue of the series would be published, and Satana would spend another decade out of publication. Ellis had actually created two issues of a planned Satana miniseries but these would not see publication until 2018, when they were included in an edition of Marvel Omnibus featuring the writer's work on Hellstorm and Druid. She returned as one of the principals of the miniseries Witches in 2004, leading to appearances in a one-shot Legion of Monsters spin-off, a team-up with Deadpool and then sharing a strip with the Black Cat in the 2011 anthology Women of Marvel. Soon afterward Satana gained her most substantial role yet, appearing as a regular character in Thunderbolts since issue #155, and remained with the team when the title transitioned into Dark Avengers, beginning with issue #175.

== Fictional character biography ==
Satana and Daimon Hellstrom were born in the fictional town of Greentown, Massachusetts. They were the half-human children of Satan (their father was later retconned into a demon named Marduk Kurios, who used the name Satan). Satana and her brother were groomed by their father to be evil, but Daimon rejected these teachings, while Satana embraced them.

When Satana was still a child, her mother, Victoria Wingate Hellstrom, discovered her husband and children's true nature and was driven insane. Daimon was raised by servants, while Satana was taken to her father's particular Hell-dimension (of which there are many in the Marvel Universe) and taught black magic. As a reward for her devotion to him, Satana's father gave her a familiar named Exiter, with whom she formed a close bond. Satana began studying magic under her father and the demon Dansker. In Hell, her soul was bonded with an evil spirit called the Basilisk (not to be confused with the supervillain the Basilisk) in order to increase her magical power.

As an adult, Satana was banished to Earth by the Four as a succubus, draining the souls of men. When she does this, the victim's soul transforms into an ethereal butterfly; Satana then consumes its essence by eating it. She also possesses the ability to gain strength through the use of weapons that were used to kill a living being. In order to do this, she merely places a portion of her own blood on the chosen weapon. She used both her magic and sexual wiles to get the victims she needed.

Satana from the miniseries Witches, art by Mike Deodato

As a succubus, she stalked victims in New York City, and then in Los Angeles she befriended a Satanist named Ruth Cummins. When Ruth was killed, Satana avenged Ruth's death by destroying Darkos Edge and Harry Gotham. She later battled the Four, a mystic cabal. During Satana's first time in the mortal dimension, she was attacked by Monsignor Jimmy Cruz and his band of soldiers. During this battle, Cruz summoned demons called the N'Garai. Exiter tried to fend them off, but was killed trying to protect his mistress. Though she was too late to save her beloved Exiter, Satana gained her revenge by killing Cruz and consuming his soul.

Satana confronted her father, who was disguised as Miles Gorney, and defied him by saving Michael Heron's soul from him. Some time later, Satana was seemingly destroyed by her brother Daimon Hellstrom, but she defeated the demoness Kthara. She was transformed by the Camarilla of the N'Garai into a human, Judith Camber. She was restored to normal, and destroyed the Camarilla.

Eventually, however, the demon to which she had been bonded began to desire its freedom. The Basilisk managed to put a curse on Doctor Strange, basically turning him into a werewolf. With the help of Spider-Man and Clea, Satana was able to free Strange's soul from the curse, but the Basilisk was released in the process, and stabbed her in the back with a mystical blade. Satana died laughing, however, because their life forces were still bound together; by killing her, the Basilisk had sealed its own fate as well. She had thus sacrificed her life to cure Strange of lycanthropy.

As a supernatural being, however, Satana's death was not permanent. Her spirit returned to her father's realm of Hell for a time, until she and a cabal of demons arranged to have her soul (among others) placed into a soulless body on Earth. There she began to build her powers again, preparing to return to Hell and conquer her father's realm.

At some point, she apparently died again. In the four-issue miniseries Witches, Satana is resurrected again by Doctor Strange and teamed with two other magic-wielding women to defeat a powerful mystic enemy called the Hellphyr, which was a front for her father Marduk Kurios. According to that miniseries, Satana and the two witches formed a coven in order to protect The Tome of Zhered-na (a powerful Book of Shadows belonging to the Kale family) from would-be thieves such as Doctor Strange.

After a brief cameo in Nick Fury's Howling Commandos, Satana has been shown to have reverted to her former evil ways; reaping souls in Manhattan and plotting her father's overthrow from the comfort of a desecrated church. Despite her fatherly conflict, Satana revealed that for every nine mortal victims she takes, she must offer the 10th victim as supplication to her father. The Hood seeks her out to find out more information about Dormammu. Some time after the fall of the Hood, Luke Cage and Doctor Strange attempt to apprehend her for working with the Hood and to get her to join the Thunderbolts. She is initially resistant, but happily agrees when she realizes she will get to work with the Man-Thing.

In the course of Marvel's Deadpool Team-Up series, Satana loses her soul to four geeks in a high-stakes poker game, and she subsequently seeks out Deadpool's help to get it back. Deadpool discovers the poker-playing geeks are actually demons debating which one will marry Satana in order to become the heir to Hell. Deadpool comes up with a plan to swindle Satana's soul back from the demons: he marries her, binding their souls together. Satana strengthens Deadpool's katana swords with his own soul power to make the inevitable fight with the demon suitor more evenly matched. When the demon comes to take Satana as his bride, Deadpool produces the marriage certificate, denying the demon his bride. The demon then points out the loophole — marriage is only valid until death; therefore, he decides to kill Deadpool. In the ensuing battle, Deadpool uses his soul-enhanced swords to easily dispatch the demon. Afterwards, Satana slips off and leaves Deadpool a letter explaining the inevitable divorce. She indicates she will be keeping half of his soul — her entitlement in the divorce settlement.

She later was involved in a battle with several Hell-lords, attempting to take control of new territories within Hell. She was killed in battle by the mutant / Asgardian god hybrid Tier.

Satana later appeared as a member of the West Coast version of the Masters of Evil led by Madame Masque.

== Powers and abilities ==
Satana from Vampire Tales #3, art by Esteban Maroto

Satana is a half-demon/half-human hybrid and a succubus; she has some innate mystical abilities inherited from her father, as well as some that her father granted to her. As a succubus, she is able to extract and feed upon the psychic energy of human male souls to increase her abilities and magical powers. For a time, Satana had to extract and feed upon the psychic energy of human souls periodically to survive. She has the ability to manipulate magical forces for a variety of effects, including inter-dimensional teleportation, levitation, and the projection of concussive bolts of eldritch energy in the form of "soulfire" or hellfire. She also had a limited ability to hypnotize her victims and control their minds psionically. If she touches an object used to kill someone (like a knife or sword) she can absorb its "blood energy" to become stronger in proportion to the souls the weapon has taken.

She also has superhuman strength. For a time, she had the ability to contain the Basilisk, a powerful demon, within her spirit and to release it to do her bidding and then return within herself. Satana also trained in the mystic arts and learned how to cast spells and perform witchcraft. She was trained by her father "Satan" in the use of her demonic powers.

== Reception ==
=== Critical reception ===
Marc Buxton of Den of Geek referred to Satana as one of the "greatest monstrous creations that ever sprang from the nightmares of the House of Ideas," writing, "The devil’s daughter herself, Satana, burst open the Marvel black and white scene in the early seventies and was a nice tribute to cleavage laden, Technicolor Hammer Horror of the era. Satana is a succubus who seduced sinners and reduced their souls into butterflies, which she then kept in a little box and at times devours. Some of the finest artists of the Bronze Age worked on Satana’s early adventures starting with Roy Thomas and John Romita Sr. and moving on to Chris Claremont and Estaban Moroto. Her adventures were clearly cut for the same cloth as the Vampirella/Harris Comics stable of fright characters but they were also adult oriented, sexy, and atmospheric." George Chrysostomou of Screen Rant asserted, "Satana is another classic Marvel character who has been around for a long time despite not becoming widely recognized. She may be another powerful member of the Thunderbolts, but she is one that is traditionally used to working solo, to follow her own self-interests. More of an anti-hero, Satana comes from a Hellish background. With demon parents, not only does Satana carry with her satanic powers, but she is often mistrusted because of her origins. She's manipulative, a sorceress, and incredibly dangerous. Her odd human and demonic heritage certainly makes the character unique."

=== Accolades ===
- In 2015, Den of Geek ranked Satana 20th in their "Marvel’s 31 Best Monsters" list.
- In 2019, Comic Book Resources (CBR) ranked Satana 2nd in their "10 Daughters Of Marvel Supervillains That Are More Dangerous Than Their Parents" list, 10th in their "10 Most Powerful Earthbound Demons and Devils In Marvel History" list, and 13th in their "21 Most Powerful Sorcerer Supreme Candidates" list.
- In 2020, CBR ranked Satana 9th in their "Deadpool: 10 Of His Love Interests" list.
- In 2021, Screen Rant ranked Satana 5th in their "10 Strangest Members Of The Thunderbolts" list.
- In 2022, WhatCulture ranked Satana 10th in their "10 Supernatural Heroes We Can’t Wait To See In The MCU" list.
- In 2022, CBR ranked Satana 6th in their "10 Best Members Of Marvel's Legion Of Monsters" list.

== Other versions ==
=== The Supernaturals ===
An alternate universe variant of Satana appears in The Supernaturals. This version is Melissa Ramos, a Catholic girl who was possessed by a demon.

== In other media ==
=== Television ===
Satana Hellstrom, renamed Ana Helstrom, appears in Helstrom, portrayed by Sydney Lemmon.

=== Video games ===
- Satana makes a non-speaking cameo appearance in Morrigan's ending in Marvel vs. Capcom 3: Fate of Two Worlds and Ultimate Marvel vs. Capcom 3.
- Satana appears as a boss and unlockable playable character in Marvel Avengers Alliance.
- Satana appears as a boss and unlockable playable character in Marvel Avengers Academy.
- Satana appears as an unlockable playable character in Marvel Future Fight.
