= Jennifer Kale =

Fictional character appearing in Marvel Comics

- Jennifer Kale. Art by Andrea Broccardo.

Publication information
- Publisher: Marvel Comics
- First appearance: Adventure into Fear #11 (December 1972)
- Created by: Steve Gerber; Rich Buckler

In-story information
- Alter ego: Jennifer Kale
- Species: Human
- Team affiliations: Legion of Night; The Command; Midnight Sons; Witches
- Partnerships: Dakimh the Enchanter; Howard the Duck; Man-Thing; Korrek
- Notable aliases: Witch Woman
- Abilities: Magic mastery

Jennifer Kale is a character appearing in American comic books published by Marvel Comics. Created by writer Steve Gerber and artist Rich Buckler, the character first appeared in Adventure into Fear #11 (December 1972). Jennifer Kale is Johnny Blaze's cousin and a sorceress who is part of the Cult of Zhered-Na. She has also been a member of the Legion of Night and the Midnight Sons at various points in her history.

The character made her live-action debut in the Marvel Cinematic Universe miniseries Agatha All Along, portrayed by Sasheer Zamata.

== Development ==
=== Concept and creation ===
Jennifer Kale was originally based on one of Steve Gerber's friends, Jennifer Meyer.

=== Publication history ===
Jennifer Kale debuted in Adventure into Fear #11 (December 1972), created by Steve Gerber and Rich Buckler.

== Fictional character biography ==
Jennifer was born into the Kale family of sorcerers in the Florida Everglades. Attuned to mystical forces since birth, she began studying her family's history of magic. Jennifer became an apprentice of Dakimh the Enchanter and the two of them acted as allies of the Man-Thing, a creature that protected a Nexus of All Realities centered in the Everglades.

Jennifer has been advised by her grandfather Joshua (even after his death), who had been a mystical Cult leader when alive. His spirit continued this after she left her training with Dakimh and attempted to live a normal life as a college student. Regardless of her efforts at normalcy for many years she has been drawn into numerous magical conflicts. Examples include her kidnapping by Baron Mordo, discovering a familial connection to the Ghost Rider, and other adventures assisting the mutant team known as X-Force.

=== Teams ===
Jennifer Kale as drawn by Mike Deodato for the Witches series.

Jennifer Kale was recruited by Doctor Strange, alongside fellow magicians Topaz and Satana, to form the group known as the Witches, hoping to keep the world safe from mystical threats and stop would-be thieves from stealing her family book. This team was short-lived and Kale next appeared with Wundarr the Aquarian and Siege as a member of Florida's Fifty State Initiative team, in an encounter with zombies from the Marvel Zombies universe, and a Skrull invasion. After the Initiative Jennifer appears as part of the new Midnight Sons team, once again fighting the Marvel Zombies.

=== Dark Reign ===
Because Strange had abused his position as Sorcerer Supreme, he had to seek out a successor, searching all over Earth. He managed to track down Jennifer with great difficulty, ultimately deciding that she was not the one despite his belief in her high abilities.

=== Heroic Age ===
Jennifer tried to stop the Thunderbolts from using the Man-Thing as their transportation, recalling him to the swamp to fight off an invasion from the Nexus of All Realities. Eventually, she realized that the Man-Thing was willingly working with the Thunderbolts, and that she would simply need to alert him any time someone broke through.

Jennifer is apparently killed by Victoria Hand who is at the time possessed by Daniel Drumm. Drumm wanted to eliminate all users of dark magic before enacting his revenge on Doctor Strange and the New Avengers.

Jennifer uses dark magic to return to life, but at the cost of having no skin on the right side of her face. Her resurrection is kept mostly secret from the world, but Maria Hill recruits her to support Elektra against Bullseye and the Hand.

== Powers and abilities ==
Jennifer Kale held tremendous potential for wielding magic and has since honed it through many years of intensive training and tutelage. Though her training was based upon the brand of magic wielded by Zhered-Na, she has since been tutored by other sorcerers and she is also self-taught to a degree. Jennifer Kale can fire magical bolts, form shields, open dimensional portals, mesmerize people, affect the memories of others, teleport herself and others, and cast numerous spells for a variety of effects.

The Tome of Zhered-Na is named after the antediluvian sorceress who foretold the end of Atlantis, and the Tome allegedly possessed all the mysticism known to man and demonkind at the time of its creation. For speaking this truth, Zhered-Na was banished and set adrift upon the sea. While she floated, her god, Valka, whispered secrets to her about the world and the world of the future. After many weeks she landed at Thuria and founded the Cult of Zhered-Na. She lived and taught there until she was slain by the demon D'Spayre. Atlantis met its fate that same day. Two spirits rescued the wisdom of Zhered-Na and decades later gave it to Illyana Kale, the descendant of a cult member. Kale was inspired then to write the Tome. Certain deities felt that too many secrets were contained inside the Book, so they placed the demon Hellphyr inside its pages to ward away unwelcome users. When the Book was recently opened and Hellphyr was released, Illyana's descendant Jennifer Kale joined with fellow witches Topaz and Satana to stop the demon and save the Tome. The Tome of Zhered-Na is currently with Jennifer Kale. Though presumably less powerful than the Darkhold or the Book of the Vishanti, it is nonetheless powerful enough to strike awe into the Sorcerer Supreme Doctor Strange and was sealed so only a member of the Jennifer Kale lineage could access it, and only then assisted by a representative of divinity and a representative of the Underworld.

== Reception ==
Adam Barnhardt of ComicBook.com called Jennifer Kale "one of Marvel's most popular horror characters." Bradley Prom of Screen Rant asserted, "She was initially introduced as a supporting character to Man-Thing but she's developed to be a hero of her own right." Deirdre Kaye of Scary Mommy called Jennifer Kale a "role model" and a "truly heroic" female character. Eric Diaz of Nerdist included Jennifer Kale in their list of "Marvel Witches We Want to See" in Agatha All Along. Nitish Vashishtha of Sportskeeda ranked Jennifer Kale 5th in their "10 Strongest Marvel Witches" list.

== Other versions ==
=== What If? ===
Alternate versions of Jennifer Kale appear in What If?:

- In a story that asks "What If the X-Men Lost Inferno?, the final remaining among Earth's mystics and superheroes that were not turned into demons after the loss of Inferno convene at the Federal Reserve Bank of New York. She-Hulk interrupts their mystic circle, and S'ym's demon horde, led by the demonically-possessed Hulk and Wolverine, immediately bursts in. The Hulk smashes Kale's skull, and most of the others are also killed.
- In another story starring Ghost Rider, Jennifer Kale appears with long hair and a prominent ring on her right nostril. She is picked up hitchhiking by Daniel Ketch, a tool of Mephisto, and is murdered and dumped in Fresh Kills Landfill.

=== Marvel MAX ===
An alternate version of Jennifer Kale appears in Roberto Aguirre-Sacasa's 2008 Marvel MAX retelling of Man-Thing's origin (which is supposed to be Roderick Krupp's interpretation of the story — Krupp is considered highly untrustworthy by Ulysses Bloodstone). Jennifer Kale is 22 years old, and 10-year-old Andrew Kale's legal guardian (they were much closer in age in the original material). She works as an exotic dancer as the Witch Woman, which also doubles for her witch's-garb when she is actually casting spells. She helps to save some amateur documentarians from mutates created in the Super Soldier Experiments, but not from Ellen Brandt leading forces of A.I.M., although she is able to protect herself and Andy from A.I.M. using a magic chalk circle.

=== Weirdworld ===
An alternate version of Jennifer Kale appears in the Secret Wars storyline. She is from Earth-11234 and resides on the Battleworld domain of Weirdworld. She is the Queen of the Man-Things that reside in the Forest of the Man-Things. After a brief conversation with the two warriors, the Swamp Queen forced Arkon and Skull the Slayer to face their fears in order to survive it and become her allies against le Fay. However, only Skull the Slayer accepted the offer to become her ally while Arkon continued to look for his kingdom of Polemachus. Arkon eventually joined up with the Swamp Queen's forces which now include a resurrected Crystar, Warbow, an army of Eyemazons, an army of Hawksqutaches, an army of Man-Wolves, and an army of Savage Elves. Both the Swamp Queen's forces and the forces of Morgan le Fay fought each other. When Battleworld fell apart, neither side was victorious and Weirdworld appeared on Earth-616 in the Bermuda Triangle.

During an incident in Weirdworld that destroyed the normal flow of time, a common occurrence on Weirdworld, the Swamp Queen had a romance with Deadpool that lasted for years. Deadpool threw this relationship away to kill a target that was hiding on Weirdworld.

== In other media ==
=== Television ===
Jennifer Kale appears in Agatha All Along, portrayed by Sasheer Zamata. This version is a witch specializing in potions who, after suffering a magical block, cannot use her powers. She is also a beauty guru, social media influencer and owner of Kale Kare, a cosmetics establishment which has been involved in multiple lawsuits for damage to health. In 2026, Kale is approached by Agatha Harkness to join her coven to walk the Witches' Road. During the last trial, Kale learns that Harkness had bound her and regains her powers after renouncing Harkness.

=== Video games ===
- Jennifer Kale makes a cameo appearance in Doctor Strange's ending in Ultimate Marvel vs. Capcom 3.
- Jennifer Kale appears as a playable DLC character in Lego Marvel's Avengers.
