= Supernatural Thrillers =

American horror fiction comic book

- Supernatural Thrillers #1 (Dec. 1972), cover art by Jim Steranko

Publication information
- Publisher: Marvel Comics
- Publication date: December 1972 – October 1975
- No. of issues: 15

Creative team
- Written by: Roy Thomas, Ron Goulart, Tony Isabella
- Artist(s): Jim Steranko, Marie Severin, Val Mayerik, George Tuska

Supernatural Thrillers was an American horror fiction comic book published by Marvel Comics in the 1970s that adapted classic stories of that genre, including works by Robert Louis Stevenson and H. G. Wells, before becoming a vehicle for a supernatural action series starring an original character, the Living Mummy.

== Publication history ==
Supernatural Thrillers ran 15 issues (cover-dated December 1972 – October 1975). The title was one of four launched by Marvel Comics editor-in-chief Roy Thomas to form a line of science fiction and horror anthologies with more thematic cohesiveness than the company's earlier attempts that decade, which had included the series Chamber of Darkness and Tower of Shadows. Whereas those titles generally presented original stories, these new books would instead adapt genre classics and other stories.

With the four titles' debuts set to be staggered over the course of four months, Marvel premiered Journey into Mystery vol. 2 (October 1972), Chamber of Chills (November 1972), Supernatural Thrillers (December 1972), and, with a late start, Worlds Unknown (May 1973). Originally slated to be titled Gothic Thrillers, the first issue of Supernatural Thrillers featured Theodore Sturgeon's 1940 short story "It!", adapted by writer-editor Thomas and penciler Marie Severin, with cover art by Jim Steranko.

Four of the next five issues likewise contained adaptations: H. G. Wells' 1897 novella The Invisible Man, by writer Ron Goulart and penciler Val Mayerik (#2), featuring another Steranko cover; Robert E. Howard's "The Valley of the Worm", co-written by Gerry Conway and Thomas and penciled by Gil Kane (#3); Robert Louis Stevenson's 1886 novella Strange Case of Dr. Jekyll and Mr. Hyde, by writer Goulart and artist Win Mortimer (#4); and the quasi-adaptation "The Headless Horseman Rides Again", writer Gary Friedrich and penciler George Tuska's original sequel to Washington Irving's 1820 short story "The Legend of Sleepy Hollow".

=== The Living Mummy ===
Issue #5 (August 1973) introduced the Living Mummy in a standalone story about an African tribal prince enslaved by Egyptians and mummified by an evil priest, who eventually reawakens in modern times. The character, created by writer Steve Gerber and penciler Rich Buckler, returned two issues later as the starring character in a generally 15-page solo series that ran from #7 to the final issue, #15 (June 1974 - October 1975). The cover logo during this time was "Supernatural Thrillers featuring The Living Mummy". With issue #8, the creative team became writer Tony Isabella and artist Val Mayerik, who was occasionally credited as co-plotter. John Warner wrote or co-wrote the final two issues, with Tom Sutton drawing the finale. Len Wein scripted #10 from an Isabella-Mayerik plot.

The series went to 16 pages with issue #11, and became a full-length, 18-page feature the following issue. Backup stories generally were reprints from "pre-superhero Marvel" science fiction/fantasy anthologies, and one case a 1953, pre-Comics Code story from Marvel predecessor Atlas Comics.

== Reprints ==
- The two covers by Jim Steranko

Marvel Visionaries: Jim Steranko (Marvel 2002, ISBN 0-7851-0944-7, ISBN 978-0-7851-0944-0

- "It"

Masters of Terror #1 (May 1975)

- "The Invisible Man"

Masters of Terror #2 (Sept. 1975)

- "The Valley of the Worm"

Kull and the Barbarians #1 (May 1975)
