= Man-Thing =

Marvel Comics character

- Man-Thing on the cover of Thunderbolts vol. 2 #154 (August 2012). Art by Arthur Adams and Frank D'Armata.

Publication information
- Publisher: Marvel Comics
- First appearance: Savage Tales #1 (May 1971)
- Created by: Stan Lee; Roy Thomas; Gerry Conway; Gray Morrow

In-story information
- Alter ego: Dr. Theodore "Ted" Sallis
- Species: Swamp monster/Human mutate
- Team affiliations: Nexus of All Realities; Midnight Sons; Thunderbolts; Daydreamers; Legion of Monsters; Avengers of the Supernatural; Ancient Order of the Shield; S.T.A.K.E.
- Partnerships: Howard the Duck
- Notable aliases: Vorgornus Koth
- Abilities: Superhuman strength, durability and stamina Empathic senses Chlorokinetic regeneration Size alteration Corrosive-chemical secretion Teleportation; Portal creation Fear empowerment Reality guardianship Plant manipulation

Man-Thing (Note: IPAc-en) is a character appearing in American comic books published by Marvel Comics. Created by writers Roy Thomas and Gerry Conway and artist Gray Morrow from an idea by Stan Lee, the character first appeared in the black and white magazine Savage Tales #1 (cover dated May 1971). He became the lead feature of the anthology Adventure into Fear with issue #10 (1972) and received his own series in 1974, written by Steve Gerber. A second series followed in 1979, and Man-Thing has since headlined a 1997 series, a 2017 miniseries by R. L. Stine, and the 2021 event "Curse of the Man-Thing", published for the character's 50th anniversary.

Dr. Theodore "Ted" Sallis is a government scientist trying to recreate the super-soldier serum that gave Captain America his powers. When his partner Ellen Brandt sells the formula, he injects himself with the only sample to keep it from his enemies, and the serum reacts with the waters of the Everglades to transform him into the swamp monster Man-Thing with little or no intellect. Man-Thing responds to the emotions of people near him, and anyone who feels fear in his presence is burned by his touch. He guards the Nexus of All Realities, a gateway between realities that lies in his swamp. His allies include the sorceress Jennifer Kale, the sorcerer Dakimh and Howard the Duck. He has been a member of the Legion of Monsters and the Midnight Sons.

Man-Thing stories, particularly Gerber's, often center on the people who wander into the swamp more than on Man-Thing himself, and they combine horror with social commentary. Man-Thing stories explore themes including environmentalism, counterculture, class politics and empathy. The character made his live-action debut in the film Man-Thing (2005), played by Conan Stevens. Another version of the character later appeared in the Marvel Cinematic Universe television special Werewolf by Night (2022), motion-captured by Carey Jones and with Jeffrey Ford providing additional vocalizations.

== Publication history ==
=== Creation ===
Stan Lee was planning Savage Tales, a black and white magazine for older readers, and decided that one of its features would be a swamp creature. Roy Thomas, Lee's assistant editor, recalled that Lee supplied the name and a general idea, in which a man comes into contact with a swamp and turns into a creature, but did not want to write the strip. Thomas thought the idea was partly inspired by the Heap, a swamp character who appeared in comics from the early 1940s to the early 1950s and whom Lee had said he liked, although the Heap never came up in their conversation. Thomas had already written a similar character based on the Heap, the Glob, for the Hulk's series with artist Herb Trimpe, and he later called the two characters almost the same. He disliked the name Man-Thing because Marvel already had the Thing, but went along with it because Lee wanted it.

Thomas wrote a synopsis several pages long for a story of about ten pages, giving Gray Morrow, who was unaccustomed to the Marvel method, a detailed outline to draw from. Gerry Conway, then 18 or 19 and newly working for Marvel, scripted the finished art in his first assignment for the company. Conway said he wrote the dialogue and created the characters' voices and names. Thomas credited Morrow with most of the design, a figure of reeds and vines with a brow and nose of roots. He said he told Morrow the character was essentially the Heap, and Morrow gave it the Heap's small carrot-like nose while making the figure look more human.

The story, in which the scientist Ted Sallis is transformed into a swamp creature in the Everglades after an experimental serum reacts with the swamp water, appeared in Savage Tales #1, cover dated May 1971, and was credited to Thomas, Conway and Morrow. Because it ran in a black and white magazine, it did not have to follow the rules of the Comics Code Authority. Publisher Martin Goodman cancelled the magazine after one issue, before sales figures were known. Thomas said Goodman was uncomfortable with black and white magazines and wary of how the Code authority might react.

=== Early years ===
A second Man-Thing story, written by Len Wein and drawn by Neal Adams for the planned second issue, ran instead in Astonishing Tales #12–13 (June–August 1972) as part of a two-part Ka-Zar story; Thomas said he did not want to leave it unused. Wein said that in the original story anything Man-Thing touched burned, and that he introduced the idea that only those who felt fear were burned because a character who set everything alight could not carry an ongoing series. DC Comics introduced Swamp Thing, written by Wein and drawn by Bernie Wrightson, in June 1971. Thomas remarked that Wein was working on that character when he wrote the Man-Thing story, and Comtois wrote that no connection between the two concepts has been established.

Man-Thing became a regular feature in Adventure into Fear with issue #10 (October 1972), again written by Conway, with art by Morrow and Howard Chaykin. Conway said Marvel was adding horror titles because the Code was being weakened and rewritten.

Steve Gerber took over the writing with Adventure into Fear #11 (December 1972), his first regular assignment at Marvel. Roy Thomas hired him as an assistant editor, but the job did not work out and Gerber continued as a freelancer. Gerber said he treated his first Man-Thing story as self-contained, without knowing whether he would write another, and that Man-Thing and similar books suited a new writer because other writers did not want them. He and Len Wein, who was writing Swamp Thing for DC, agreed that their books would be nothing alike, and Gerber asked Wein what he had planned so that he could do something different.

Because Man-Thing could neither speak nor think, Gerber built most stories around the people who wandered into the swamp and crossed his path, a format Thomas compared to the old Heap stories, in which the Heap often stayed at the edge of the plot. Gerber said he wrote most of the series by giving the penciler a plot of five or six single-spaced pages and adding dialogue once the art was drawn. Jim Mooney, who joined with issue #17, said Gerber supplied full scripts.

Rich Buckler and Mooney, as inker, drew Adventure into Fear #11, and Jim Starlin and Buckler drew #12. Val Mayerik became the penciler with #13 (April 1973) and stayed through the end of the run and the first four issues of the Man-Thing series. Mayerik later said he was unhappy with the inking and coloring of his work, and that Chic Stone, who inked one job, was the only inker who satisfied him. Frank Brunner began drawing covers with #15 (August 1973), at Thomas's suggestion. Thomas recalled that Stan Lee ordered changes to Wundarr, a Superman-like character Gerber introduced in #17 (October 1973), to avoid a complaint from DC Comics.

Adventures into Fear #19 (December 1973) was Man-Thing's last issue as the lead feature. It introduced Howard the Duck, and its story ended in the first issue of Man-Thing (January 1974). Morbius, the Living Vampire, took over the lead in Adventures into Fear with #20 (February 1974). Gerber wrote all 22 issues of Man-Thing, which ran until October 1975. Mike Ploog, who had been drawing Werewolf by Night, became the artist with #5 (May 1974), and he and Gerber plotted most stories by telephone. Ploog's run ended with #11. John Buscema drew his first Man-Thing story in Giant-Size Man-Thing #2 (November 1974), Alfredo Alcalá drew part of #14, and Mooney drew #17 through the end.

A quarterly companion, Giant-Size Man-Thing, ran for five issues from August 1974 to August 1975. Gerber wrote for all five; the last was an anthology that also included stories by Wein and Marv Wolfman. Howard the Duck's first solo story, drawn by Brunner, ran in #4 (May 1975). Gerber also wrote text stories, illustrated by Pat Broderick, for the black and white magazine Monsters Unleashed #8–9 (October–December 1974). The final issue of Man-Thing, #22 (October 1975), took the form of a letter from Gerber to editor Wein, with Gerber appearing as a character. Thomas later said the series was never a big sales success.

Man-Thing also appeared outside his own titles. In Marvel Two-in-One #1 (January 1974), written by Gerber, the Thing travels to Florida, objects to a monster sharing his name, and ends up fighting the Molecule Man alongside him. Man-Thing appeared with the Legion of Monsters in Marvel Premiere #28 (February 1976), and in The Incredible Hulk #197–198 (March–April 1976), Marvel Team-Up #68 (April 1978), Marvel Two-in-One #43 (September 1978) and Micronauts #7 (July 1979). Gerber and Starlin produced a Man-Thing story for The Rampaging Hulk #7 (February 1978), and Mayerik drew Man-Thing again in Howard the Duck #22–23 (March–April 1978). A new Man-Thing series began with a first issue cover-dated November 1979, written by Michael Fleisher with pencils by Mooney.

=== 1980s–2020s ===
Bob Wiacek, who asked editor-in-chief Jim Shooter for the job when he heard that Man-Thing was returning, drew every cover of the new series and inked most of its interiors. Shooter said that Marvel was doing well and looking for more material to publish, and that Man-Thing had a small cult following. Wiacek recalled that the original pencils for the second issue were lost, so he inked from photocopies.

With #4 (May 1980), Chris Claremont, who was also writing Doctor Strange, replaced Fleisher as writer, and Don Perlin became the penciler. That issue crossed over with Doctor Strange and left its resolution to the next issue of that title. Claremont answered the letters column himself and promised stories that leaned toward the fantastic. Issue #7 (November 1980) brought back Captain Fate, a pirate who first appeared in #13 (January 1975) of the earlier series.

Issue #9 (March 1981) was a fill-in written by Dickie McKenzie with art by Larry Hama and Danny Bulanadi. Wiacek thought Hama had drawn the story for inventory and that the regular issue was running late. Marvel had found Wiacek's cover compositions weak, and from that issue Ed Hannigan supplied layouts for them. For #10 (May 1981), the inking was credited to "Wiacek & Co." because of a deadline problem, and Frank Giacoia, Bruce Patterson and Al Milgrom each inked pages.

The series ended with its eleventh issue. Claremont wrote it, Val Mayerik penciled it, Wiacek inked it, and Danny Fingeroth was the editor. Claremont appears in a Manhattan pub, where Shooter, Louise Jones and Fingeroth ask him why he has resigned. Wiacek said that the cover's corner box, which shows Man-Thing with a tear running from one eye, was his idea.

Gerber later returned to the character in the anthology Marvel Comics Presents, writing short installments drawn by Tom Sutton, including a story set against United States involvement in the South American drug trade. He also wrote Infernal Man-Thing in the 1980s, shortly before his dispute with Marvel. It was completed with art by Kevin Nowlan and published in 2012, after Gerber's death in 2008.

J.M. DeMatteis began writing the character in a backup story in Man-Thing vol. 2 #9 (March 1981), which opened with a fill-in by Dickie McKenzie. DeMatteis would go on to write Man-Thing stories in Marvel Team-Up, The Defenders, Marvel Fanfare, and the miniseries Daydreamers, as well as Man-Thing vol. 3 #1-8 (Dec. 1997–July 1998), illustrated by Liam Sharp. The two would re-team for the Man-Thing feature in Strange Tales vol. 4 #1-2 (Sept.–Oct. 1998). Four issues were written, but #3 and 4 were never published. Their stories were summarized briefly in Peter Parker: Spider-Man Annual '99, also by DeMatteis, with art by Sharp and others.

In the 2000s, the Man-Thing has starred in a handful of stories appearing in one-shots and miniseries, including Marvel Knights Double Shot #2 (July 2002) by Ted McKeever, and Legion of Monsters: Man-Thing #1 (May 2007) by Charlie Huston and Klaus Janson.

In 2008, writer Roberto Aguirre-Sacasa retold Man-Thing's origin in Dead of Night featuring the Man-Thing #1-4 (April–July 2008), from the Marvel MAX imprint. This was followed by an eight-page story in Marvel Comics Presents (vol. 2) #12 (Oct. 2008), by writer Jai Nitz and artist Ben Stenbeck.

The Man-Thing appeared regularly during The Punisher's Franken-Castle story arc and became a regular member of Thunderbolts with issue #144. The series was retitled Dark Avengers with #175, and the Man-Thing continued to appear as a regular character until issue #183. Steve Gerber's posthumous Man-Thing story "The Screenplay of the Living Dead Man", with art by Kevin Nowlan, originally planned as a 1980s graphic novel before being left uncompleted by the artist, was revived in the 2010s and appeared as a three-issue miniseries cover-titled The Infernal Man-Thing (Early Sept.-Oct. 2012). The story was a sequel to Gerber's "Song-Cry of the Living Dead Man" in Man-Thing #12 (Dec. 1974).

Author R. L. Stine made his comics debut with a five-issue Man-Thing miniseries in 2017.

In 2020, the storyline "Curse of the Man-Thing" was announced in celebration of the character's 50th anniversary. The story comprises three one-shot issues: Avengers: Curse of the Man-Thing (released March 2021), Spider-Man: Curse of the Man-Thing (released April 2021), and X-Men: Curse of the Man-Thing (released May 2021).

The horror anthology one-shot Crypt of Shadows #1, on sale on October 19, 2022, included "Endless Slaughter in the Infinite Swamp", written and drawn by Adam Warren, in which Man-Thing fights X-23. A second Crypt of Shadows one-shot, on sale on October 16, 2024, included "The Green Tide", by Percy and Raffaele Ienco, in which Man-Thing faces Namor.

Marvel announced Beastly Buddies, an Infinity Comic for Marvel Unlimited written by Steve Foxe and drawn by Armand Bodnar, at San Diego Comic-Con in July 2024. It follows Man-Thing and Werewolf by Night, and the first chapter was released on October 18, 2024. In Uncanny X-Men #14, written by Gail Simone and drawn by David Marquez, on sale on May 14, 2025, Man-Thing guides the Outliers through passages beneath Haven House in Louisiana.

== Characterization ==
=== Fictional character biography ===
The Man-Thing #1 (Jan. 1974). Cover art by Frank Brunner.

Young biochemist Dr. Theodore "Ted" Sallis, a native of Omaha, Nebraska, worked in the Everglades as a part of Wilma Calvin's Project: Gladiator team, intending to recreate the Super-Soldier Serum that empowered Captain America. Though warned that the technological terrorist group Advanced Idea Mechanics (A.I.M.) has been operating in the area, Sallis breaches security by bringing with him his lover, Ellen Brandt (later retconned to be his wife). He destroys his notes to his formula, which he has memorized. Later, he is ambushed by two thugs and learns that Brandt has betrayed him. Fleeing with the only sample of his serum, Sallis injects himself with it in hopes of saving himself. However, he crashes his car into the swamp, where scientific and magical forces combine to transform him into a plant-matter creature. Unable to speak, and retaining little of Sallis's mind, Man-Thing attacks the ambushers and Brandt before wandering away into the swamp.

Under writer Steve Gerber, the Man-Thing encounters the sorceress Jennifer Kale, with whom he briefly shared a psychic link and who knew his true identity, in a story arc in Fear #11-13 – the final issue of which established that the swamp had mystical properties as the Nexus of Realities. Through an interdimensional portal in Fear #19, he meets Howard the Duck, who becomes stranded in this reality. Man-Thing became the guardian of the Nexus, and found himself facing demons, ghosts and time-traveling warriors, while continuing to encounter non-supernatural antagonists as rapacious land developers, fascist vigilantes, and common criminals. He formed a bond with young radio DJ Richard Rory and nurse Ruth Hart. Issue #12's "Song-Cry of the Living Dead Man", about crazed writer Brian Lazarus, spawned Gerber's posthumously published 2012 sequel, "The Screenplay of the Living Dead Man", in the three-issue miniseries The Infernal Man-Thing.

In Man-Thing vol. 2 #1-11 (Nov. 1979–July 1981), writer Chris Claremont introduced himself as a character in the final issue, as Gerber had in the finale of the first series. Additionally, Claremont temporarily became Man-Thing after being killed. His and other characters' deaths were later resolved with the intervention of the War Is Hell series lead, John Kowalski, now an aspect of Marvel Comics' manifestation of Death. In Man-Thing vol. 3 #1-8 (Dec. 1997–July 1998), Ellen Brandt returns to the Citrusville area and encounters a little boy, Job Burke, who is actually the Sallises' son and had been put up for adoption. Following this series, the story continued in Strange Tales vol. 4 #1-2, and was projected to continue in the unpublished issues #3-4. Summaries based on DeMatteis' unillustrated scripts appear on the K'Ad-mon and Ellen Brandt pages in Appendix to the Handbook of the Marvel Universe.

Man-Thing joins the Legion of Monsters alongside Morbius, Werewolf by Night, Manphibian, and N'Kantu, the Living Mummy. He gains the ability to speak comprehensibly through the use of the "Universal Language". Phil Coulson subsequently recruits Man-Thing into the Howling Commandos.

Harriet Brome, an agent of the self-proclaimed eco-warrior group Hordeculture, adopts the name "Harrower" and attempts to use Man-Thing to perform a mass culling of humanity, intending to purge humans and let another species take over. To this end, she attacks and skins Man-Thing and uses his corpse to produce seedling spores that will emerge in all major cities across the world and burn their victims. When the Avengers respond, Captain America is briefly absorbed by one of the spores and meets the remnants of Ted Sallis, who explains that he never truly cracked the super-soldier serum. After Sallis's essence creates a new body for Man-Thing, Man-Thing returns to Sallis's old office, where it is revealed that Sallis made a deal with the demon Belasco to crack the formula. When he performs the ritual again, he summons Magik, who offers to release Sallis from his current state. Understanding that his freedom would leave Man-Thing an uncontrolled creature of instinct, Sallis agrees to remain and joins Magik's team in defeating Harrower.

Man-Thing later appears as a teacher at Strange Academy, where he teaches Care for Magical Plants.

=== Personality and motivations ===
Man-Thing does not speak and has little or no intellect. He keeps Ted Sallis's soul and faint traces of his intellect but is not intelligent in any meaningful sense. He is generally mindless and reacts only to the emotions of those around him. Henry Kamerling writes that he lacks any memory of his human past and that what survives of Sallis' consciousness shows only in his capacity to sense and feel. The historian Chris Wilhelm describes him as a silent hero with no speech or internal monologue, driven solely by the emotions of others and drawn to positive ones while repelled by negative ones.

Because he has no plans of his own, his part in a story is set by the people around him. Gerry Conway, who wrote Man-Thing's earliest stories, said that he was a reactive character at a company whose stories usually revolved around heroes who caused events, so the plots had to center on the supporting cast, and that any agenda he had came from the situation the writers put him in. In Adventure into Fear #10, he is overwhelmed by the emotions of a quarreling couple, and the disturbance he causes makes them remember why they fell in love. Eliot Borenstein reads him as a surrogate for the feelings of the people he meets, with motives borrowed from them, and notes that in the two-part story in Man-Thing #5–6 he appears as a clown's inner demon.

Writers disagree about how far he can be called a protector. Blair Davis calls him a largely inadvertent hero who sometimes helps victims by accident while responding to whatever directly threatens him. Kamerling describes him as an unerring defender of the downtrodden and reads Man-Thing's carrying the dead Black Eagle back to his father in Adventure into Fear #16 as an act of compassion. Wilhelm says that Gerber made him an ethical barometer for the people of Citrusville.

Gerber's friend and frequent collaborator Mary Skrenes said that Gerber found Man-Thing a difficult and disliked character because he had no personality, thoughts or feelings, and that he used that to tell stories about characters and ideas that mattered to him. Val Mayerik, who drew the character in the 1970s and on the last issue of the second series, said that Man-Thing has no intellectual process and is one-dimensional in some ways, but that his vulnerability, his apparent sensitivity and the way people misunderstand him lead readers to sympathize or identify with him. Katherine Gill argues that the early narration's habit of addressing Man-Thing as "you" and asking whether any humanity remains in him draws readers toward identifying with him.

=== Powers and abilities ===
Man-Thing is a humanoid about seven feet tall and weighing about 500 pounds, with large red eyes. His body is made of algae, moss and fibrous weeds held together by animated roots, and root-like strands hanging from his head form the features of his face. He has no mouth, nose or ears, walks slowly and awkwardly, and gives off a strong smell of rot from the bacteria in his body. Henry Kamerling describes the body as brown-green, with pockets of mud, vines and rocks protruding from it, and claws.

Because his body is porous muck, fists and bullets pass through him or lodge harmlessly, and that lost mass reforms from the surrounding swamp. He can ooze through openings that look too small, taking longer the narrower the gap. He is superhumanly strong, able to press at least 1,000 pounds, and he is virtually indestructible. Stories in the original run showed him oozing through nets and jail cell bars, and in Giant-Size Man-Thing #2 neither Mister Fantastic's stretching limbs nor police bullets can stop him.

Man-Thing responds to the emotions of people near him. A caption in Man-Thing #12 describes him as a creature of emotion rather than intellect, who reads the emotions of others and feels what they feel. Mild emotions make him curious and lead him to watch from a distance, while strong ones, such as fear, anger and hatred, cause him extreme discomfort and may provoke an attack. In the second Man-Thing series, the emotions of a pirate crew pain him and he lashes out at them. He remembers emotional patterns and so recognizes people he has met, up to a limit, after which he stops moving until his cells purge the excess. A caption in Adventure into Fear #13 says he has dimly recognized the Kale children as his friends.

His most well-known power is a touch that burns people who feel fear. In the original Savage Tales story, anything he touched burned, and Len Wein limited the effect to those who were afraid. The rule became the series' tagline, which the narration repeated in the Gerber stories and which the second series later printed above its title. Explanations of the burn have varied. A few early stories attributed it to a reaction between chemicals released by a frightened person and those in Man-Thing's body, but the explanation was soon dropped. The Official Handbook of the Marvel Universe published in 1987 says he excretes fuming sulfuric acid whenever he is provoked to violence and otherwise produces a soapy mucus that neutralizes it. The 2024 edition of the Marvel New Edition Encyclopedia says that fear changes his chemical makeup so that his touch burns anyone who feels it, a result it calls a quirk of chemistry. In Giant-Size Man-Thing #2, a caption says his hatred of fear overcomes even the pain it causes him, and he breaks free of a display case when a museum audience panics.

The longer Man-Thing is away from the swamp, the weaker he becomes. He collapses in New York in Giant-Size Man-Thing #2 and weakens at sea in Man-Thing #13–14, where magic restores his strength. After he is dumped into a sewage treatment plant in #17, he becomes self-sustaining and can leave the swamp. He still weakens when kept from his swamp, but slowly, and recovers quickly when he is wet. Magic also affects him. In the second series, Baron Mordo controls him and Thog later changes him back into Ted Sallis, and in Giant-Size Man-Thing #3 an old wizard says his powers peak at the Nexus of All Realities.

== Supporting characters ==
=== Allies ===
Gerber told most of his Man-Thing stories through the people who wandered into the swamp, and he gave the series a rotating supporting cast. The most durable members were the Kale family of Citrusville. In Adventure into Fear #11, the teenager Jennifer Kale tries to summon the demon Thog with a book borrowed from her grandfather, and her younger brother Andy burns the book to send him back. Their grandfather Joshua, who leads the Cult of Zhered-Na, appears in #13. Kamerling notes that captions describe Man-Thing as recognizing the two children as friends and describe an empathic bond between him and Jennifer. In #14 and #15, Man-Thing and Jennifer are taken to another realm and meet Dakimh the Enchanter, the last disciple of the Atlantean sorceress Zhered-Na, who insists on calling Man-Thing the "Man-Object". Jennifer is revealed as Zhered-Na's heir and becomes Dakimh's apprentice.

Dakimh, Jennifer, Korrek and Howard the Duck join Man-Thing in the story that ends the Adventure into Fear run and begins the Man-Thing series, in which they defend the swamp's Nexus of Realities against Thog. Korrek, a barbarian, first appears in #19, emerging from a jar of peanut butter. In Giant-Size Man-Thing #3 (February 1975), Man-Thing saves him from men plotting to take his throne. Howard the Duck, whom Gerber created with Val Mayerik, also debuts in #19, and his first solo story ran in Giant-Size Man-Thing #4. The group reunites in Howard the Duck #22–23 (March–April 1978).

Richard Rory, introduced in Man-Thing #2 (February 1974), is a drifter whom Man-Thing rescues from an alligator. Davis describes him as recently out of work, and he later finds a job at a Citrusville radio station. Roger Ash calls him a stand-in for Gerber and the voice of the series. In the same issue, Rory helps Ruth Hart, a young biker whose gang accuses her of theft, prove her innocence; she later appears as a nurse in Omega the Unknown. After the book-burning story, Rory and Man-Thing leave Citrusville with a teenager, Carol Selby, who asked to come along.

The second Man-Thing series (1979–81) introduced Barbie Bannister, a young woman who escapes kidnappers and finds refuge in Citrusville, where she meets Sheriff John Daltry, with whom she later keeps company. In #10 John Kowalski, a character from the war comic War Is Hell, arrives in Citrusville, senses that Man-Thing is Ted Sallis, and says he could cure or release him.

Man-Thing has also joined groups of monster characters. He is a member of the Legion of Monsters, which first appeared in Marvel Premiere #28 (February 1976), and he belonged to a later incarnation of the Midnight Sons that Wong assembled to fight Mephisto in Las Vegas. Magik offered Ted Sallis the chance to be free of Man-Thing, that he declined so the creature would not roam unchecked, and that he worked with her Dark Riders, who helped him fight the eco-terrorist Harrower. Gill writes that in Thunderbolts (2010–11) Man-Thing lives in the basement of the team's base, which his presence turns into a swamp, and mostly carries the team from place to place.

=== Enemies ===
Man-Thing's first enemies are the people who betray Ted Sallis. In Savage Tales #1, Ellen Brandt sells his formula to the highest bidder, and after Sallis is transformed Man-Thing kills her hired thugs and burns her face. Gill describes the buyer in that story as an unnamed corporation. Astonishing Tales #12–13 names the organization behind the scientists who worked with Sallis as A.I.M. A story by Tony Isabella and Vicente Alcazar in Monsters Unleashed #5 (April 1974) gave Ellen some redemption.

Thog the Nether-Spawn, a demon Jennifer Kale summons by accident in Adventure into Fear #11, is the most frequently recurring villain. He returns in #13, where he briefly restores Man-Thing to human form, and again in #19 and Man-Thing #1 as the Overlord, who leads an invasion of demons through the swamp's Nexus of Realities. In Man-Thing #19, Thog is revealed as the villain behind a scheme in Atlanta. Gerber's letter-format final issue says he developed a plan to drive the world mad using a pyramid of Nightmare Boxes. Thog also appears in the last issue of the second series, where he turns Man-Thing back into Sallis and is destroyed by Man-Thing's touch.

F. A. Schist, whose full name is Franklin Armstrong Schist, is a developer who plans to drain part of the swamp for an airport. He is introduced in Adventures into Fear #16 and returns in Man-Thing #2–4 and #7–8. In #2 he hires Hargood Wickham to kill Man-Thing. The airport is shelved in #7–8 because of the energy crisis, and Schist is revealed to have been searching for the Fountain of Youth. Both he and Wickham die. Wilhelm calls his name an obvious play on "fascist."

Foolkiller, a religious zealot who regards most people as fools, appears in Man-Thing #3–4 (March–April 1974). According to Ash, he comes to Florida to kill Sallis, Schist and Rory, figures out that Man-Thing is Sallis, and kills him, although Man-Thing recovers. He is killed when a stray shot shatters the glass case holding his dead mentor and a shard impales him.

A three-issue arc that begins in Man-Thing #16 (April 1975) introduces the Mad Viking. Davis identifies him as Josefsen, a longshoreman who suffers a breakdown after his union's mandatory retirement rule ends his job. Borenstein calls the arc a bitter deconstruction of American masculinity. Olivia Selby, who leads a group of mothers called the Mothers' March for Decency, joins him in a book burning in Citrusville. The Viking kills his granddaughter, and he is destroyed by a foaming creature that rises from the town's sewage treatment plant.

Gerber's other recurring villains include Captain Fate, the commander of a pirate ship that sails through the sky and carries off Man-Thing in Man-Thing #13–14 (January–February 1975). Claremont brought him back in the second series, where he dies at Man-Thing's touch in #8. Scavenger, a masked man whose kiss kills and passes his victim's feelings to him, appears in #19. In the second series' fourth issue, Baron Mordo has taken control of Man-Thing. Later stories pit him against D'Spayre, a demon who feeds on suffering; Belasco, whom Jennifer Kale conjures after Man-Thing seeks vengeance for an infernal pact; and the eco-terrorist Harrower.

== Other versions ==
=== Deadpool Kills the Marvel Universe ===
An alternate universe version of Man-Thing from Earth-12101 appears in Deadpool Kills the Marvel Universe #4.

=== Earth-91 ===
Several characters from Earth-91 based on Man-Thing appear in Avengers Forever #5.

=== Earth-691 ===
An alternate universe version of Man-Thing from Earth-691 appears in Amazing Adventures #38.

=== Earth-11234 ===
An alternate universe version of Man-Thing from Earth-11234 appears in Champions (vol. 2). This version is a member of the Swamp Queen Alliance, led by his world's version of Jennifer Kale.

=== Mutant X ===
An alternate universe version of Man-Thing from Earth-1298, amalgamated with Doctor Strange, appears in Mutant X.

=== The Adventures of the X-Men ===
An alternate universe version of Man-Thing from an unidentified universe appears in The Adventures of the X-Men.

=== Ultimate Marvel ===
An alternate universe version of Man-Thing from Earth-1610 appears in the Ultimate Marvel imprint.

=== Warp World ===
Man-Thing Thang Thoom, a fusion of Man-Thing and Fin Fang Foom created by the Infinity Gems, appears in the Infinity Wars storyline.

=== What If ===
An alternate universe version of Man-Thing from Earth-8130 appears in What If...? #26. This version regained sentience as Man-Thing, but was killed by an alligator, who became his successor.

== In other media ==
=== Television ===
- The Man-Thing appears in The Super Hero Squad Show episode "This Man-Thing, This Monster! (Six Against Infinity, Part 3)", voiced by Dave Boat. This version is from an alternate reality populated primarily by monsters and is a founding member of the Supernatural Hero Squad.
- The Man-Thing appears in the Ultimate Spider-Man episode "The Howling Commandos" as a member of the Howling Commandos.
- The Man-Thing appears in the Hulk and the Agents of S.M.A.S.H. episode "Hulking Commandos" as a member of the Howling Commandos.
- The Man-Thing appears in Guardians of the Galaxy.
- Hulu intended to air a special titled The Offenders: Giant Sized Man-Thing, which would have seen Howard the Duck, MODOK, Hit-Monkey, Tigra, and Dazzler join forces to fight the titular character. However, in January 2020, Howard the Duck and Tigra & Dazzler's series were canceled, resulting in The Offenders getting canceled as well.
- The Man-Thing appears in the Marvel Cinematic Universe (MCU) special Werewolf by Night, motion-captured by Carey Jones and additional vocalizations by Jeffrey Ford.

=== Film ===
- The Man-Thing appears in a self-titled film, portrayed by Conan Stevens. This version was a Seminole shaman and chieftain before he was murdered and reborn as Man-Thing.
- The Man-Thing appears in Hulk: Where Monsters Dwell, voiced by Jon Olson. This version is a member of the Howling Commandos.

=== Video games ===
- The Man-Thing makes a cameo appearance in Jill Valentine's ending in Marvel vs. Capcom 3: Fate of Two Worlds and Ultimate Marvel vs. Capcom 3.
- The Man-Thing appears as an unlockable playable character in Marvel Avengers Academy.
- The Man-Thing appears as a boss and unlockable playable character in Lego Marvel Super Heroes 2.
- The Man-Thing appears as an unlockable playable character in Marvel Contest of Champions.
- The Man-Thing appears as an unlockable playable character in Marvel Puzzle Quest.

=== Miscellaneous ===
- The Man-Thing appears in Marvel Super Hero Squad #10.
- Ted Sallis and his transformation into the Man-Thing was adapted into The Mountain Goats's "Song For Ted Sallis", which appears on the Hex of Infinite Binding EP.
- Man-Thing also appears in an LP produced by Power Records in 1974 entitled Night of the Laughing Dead, an audio dramatization of Man Thing #5.

=== Merchandise ===
- The Man-Thing received an action figure in Toy Biz's Marvel Legends line in 2005.
- The Man-Thing received six miniatures from HeroClix, with four being released in the "Mutant Mayhem" set in 2004 and two in the "Amazing Spider-Man" HeroClix set in 2013.
- The Man-Thing received a build-a-figure in Hasbro's Marvel Legends line in 2017.
- The Man-Thing received a San Diego Comic-Con 2019 exclusive Funko Pop vinyl figure.
- The MCU incarnation of the Man-Thing received a Funko Pop vinyl figure as part of a Werewolf by Night tie-in set in 2023.

== Reception ==
The Man-Thing was ranked #7 on a listing of Marvel Comics' monster characters in 2015.
