= Hulk and the Agents of S.M.A.S.H. =

Television series

- Genre: Superhero; Comedy
- Based on: Hulk by: Stan Lee; Jack Kirby
- Developed by: Paul Dini; Henry Gilroy; Marvel Animation
- Voices of: Fred Tatasciore; Clancy Brown; Seth Green; Eliza Dushku; Benjamin Diskin; James Arnold Taylor
- Composer: Guy Michelmore
- Country of origin: United States
- Original language: English
- No. of seasons: 2
- No. of episodes: 52 (list of episodes)

Production
- Executive producers: Alan Fine; Dan Buckley; Jeph Loeb; Joe Quesada
- Editor: Fred Udell
- Running time: 22 minutes
- Production companies: Marvel Animation; Film Roman

Original release
- Network: Disney XD
- Release: August 11, 2013 – June 28, 2015

Related
- Avengers Assemble; Ultimate Spider-Man; Marvel Super Hero Adventures: Frost Fight!; Guardians of the Galaxy; Hulk: Where Monsters Dwell

Hulk and the Agents of S.M.A.S.H. is an American animated television series based on the superhero character by Marvel Comics. The series premiered on August 11, 2013, on Disney XD as part of the Marvel Universe block, and ended on June 28, 2015.

== Plot ==
The story is told from the perspective of an online reality show created by Rick Jones to foster public acceptance of the Hulk as a hero and not a monster. The "show" is filmed by drones that accompany the Agents of the Supreme Military Agency of Super Humans (S.M.A.S.H.) everywhere they go.

Hulk, She-Hulk, Red Hulk, Rick as A-Bomb, and Skaar come together as the Agents of S.M.A.S.H. to tackle threats that no other superheroes can face. The Agents have their base near the town of Vista Verde (where Bruce Banner first became Hulk) and face numerous villains, most prominently the Leader. Early in the series, Skaar is revealed to be a mole for the Leader, but the Agents eventually convince him to reform.

In Season Two, upon their return to Earth following their fights with the Kree and the Skrull, the Agents of S.M.A.S.H. are hunted by S.H.I.E.L.D. and the military after the Leader frames them. After proving their innocence, the Agents of S.M.A.S.H. deal with the Leader traveling back in time to alter history, followed by an invasion from the Kree in retaliation for the incarceration of Ronan the Accuser.

== Episodes ==
Season	Episodes	Originally released	
Season	Episodes	First released	Last released
1	26	August 11, 2013	December 3, 2014
2	26	October 12, 2014	June 28, 2015

== Cast ==
- Fred Tatasciore – Bruce Banner / Hulk
- Seth Green – Rick Jones / A-Bomb
- Eliza Dushku – Jennifer Walters / She-Hulk
- Clancy Brown – Thaddeus "Thunderbolt" Ross / Red Hulk
- Benjamin Diskin – Skaar
- James Arnold Taylor – Samuel Sterns / Leader

== Production ==
Hulk and the Agents of S.M.A.S.H. was unveiled at the 2011 San Diego Comic Con. Pre-production was outsourced to New Zealand-based company Karactaz Animation. Film Roman was contracted to produce. Before it aired, writers Paul Dini and Henry Gilroy were confirmed to be writing for the series. Supervising producer Cort Lane described the series as, "a great story about a great group of characters who have a really interesting family-style dynamic. It's very funny, with just the most amazing voice cast." On July 26, 2014, the series was renewed for a second season.

On July 12, 2015, Marvel Animation vice president Stephen Wacker confirmed that the series had ended after the second season.

== Broadcast ==
The series premiered on Teletoon in Canada on January 10, 2014, and on April 13, 2014 on CITV in the United Kingdom.

== Reception ==
Jesse Schedeen of IGN gave the show's premiere a "Mediocre" score of 5.8 out of 10, panning the show's reliance on humor, which came at the expense of dramatic weight. Schedeen surmised that the series was targeted primarily at young boys and summarized it as "a disappointing new addition to Disney XD's growing Marvel lineup".
