= N'Kantu, the Living Mummy =

Comic book character

The Living Mummy
- Cover of Supernatural Thrillers #5 (August 1973). Art by Rich Buckler.

Publication information
- Publisher: Marvel Comics
- First appearance: Supernatural Thrillers #5 (August 1973)
- Created by: Steve Gerber; Rich Buckler

In-story information
- Alter ego: N'Kantu
- Species: Mummy
- Team affiliations: S.H.I.E.L.D.'s Paranormal Containment Unit; Shock Troop; Legion of Monsters
- Notable aliases: The Mummy, Captain Ace Bandages
- Abilities: Superhuman strength and durability High-level resistance to injury Mystic senses

N'Kantu the Living Mummy is a fictional character appearing in American comic books published by Marvel Comics. The character's first run was from 1973 to 1975, and was based on the popular undead mummy trope of horror fiction.

== Publication history ==
N'Kantu the Living Mummy first appeared in Supernatural Thrillers #5 (August 1973), created by Steve Gerber and Rich Buckler. It introduced the character in a standalone story set in Cairo, Egypt, "The Living Mummy". N'Kantu the Living Mummy returned two issues later in "The Return of the Living Mummy" by the same team, who brought the character to New York City. With the cover logo reading "Supernatural Thrillers featuring The Living Mummy", the series ran from #7 to the final issue, #15 (June 1974 - Oct. 1975). With issue #8, the creative team became writer Tony Isabella and artist Val Mayerik, occasionally credited as co-plotter. John Warner wrote or co-wrote the final two issues, with Tom Sutton drawing the finale. Len Wein scripted #10 from an Isabella-Mayerik plot.

N'Katu was revived in 1983 for an issue of Marvel Two-in-One (issue #95, January 1983), teamed up with the Thing.

== Fictional character biography ==
Born 3,000 years ago, N'Kantu is the son of T'Chombi, a chief of a Northern African tribe called the Swarili. At the age of 21, N'Kantu must undergo the Test of the Lion, proving himself to be worthy of being called a warrior. Succeeding in this trial also means that someday N'Kantu would be worthy to succeed his father as king. Months later, his father dies in his sleep, and N'Kantu becomes the chieftain of the Swarili tribe.

Returning from a hunt, N'Kantu finds that his village has been ransacked and the entire tribe of Swarili rounded up by Egyptians as slaves. N'Kantu fights to rescue his people, but is overwhelmed and captured by the Egyptian soldiers.

N'Kantu and the Swarili are then taken to Egypt, and put to work building monuments to the current Pharaoh, Aram-Set. Recognized as the strongest, and most dangerous of the Swarili, N'Kantu is isolated and forced to work the hardest in an attempt to break his spirit. But at night he and the other Swarili people plot a rebellion, though unbeknownst to them their plotting is being reported to Aram-Set and his chief priest, Nephrus. At the completion of the current monument project, the Egyptians take their slaves into its catacombs in preparation for a mass execution. But N'Kantu signals for the revolt and the Swarili slaughter their would-be executioners.

N'Kantu slays Aram-Set with his spear and then turns to Nephrus, but the evil priest had prepared, and he sprays N'Kantu in the face with a mysterious paralyzing liquid. N'Kantu is then strapped and bound to a special altar, his body wrapped in papyrus, and his blood is drained and replaced with an unknown preservative. N'Kantu, who remains conscious through the entire ordeal, is then placed inside a stone sarcophagus.

In modern times, the paralyzing fluid wears off and N'Kantu escapes from his tomb. Deranged from being paralyzed in a dark tomb for several millennia, he digs himself free and goes on a rampage in Cairo, Egypt. He later recovers from his insanity and discovers Doctor Alexi Skarab, one of Nephrus' surviving descendants. N'Kantu was electrocuted into unconsciousness. His lifeless body is shipped to a New York City museum, where he is revived. He is teleported to the dimension of the Elementals, who ordered him to find the ruby scarab. While searching, he battled Professor Abdol, the Living Pharaoh. N'Kantu then battled the Elementals, and vanquished them with the aid of the Scarab he had found. During later travels, N'Kantu befriends Ulysses Bloodstone. Some time after that N'Kantu is kidnapped by the Grandmaster for the Contest of Champions, but the Grandmaster does not consider him worthy enough to be a combatant and returns him to Earth.

N'Kantu later teams up with the Thing and his girlfriend Alicia Masters against General Hassan, another descendant of Nephrus, preventing him from obtaining the Spirit Gem. After this, he returns to the desert where he began searching for the Bloodgem. However, when Captain America and his "partner" Diamondback are after the gem as well, they convince N'Kantu to hand over the fragments he had found.

Later, N'Kantu is approached to join the Shock Troop organization. They help free Quasar from the Darkforce entity known as Quagmire, and disband afterward. Later he gets into a fight with the evil Rakses and has to team up with Elsa Bloodstone, the daughter of his old ally. After defeating this villain, N'Kantu spends some time guarding the mystic Orb of Ra. During this time, N'Kantu is approached by Nick Fury and is convinced to join his group of Howling Commandos, and they fight against Merlin in Area 13.

N'Kantu during the Civil War event. Art by Steve Lieber.

Soon afterward, N'Kantu was seen as one of the heroes against the Super-hero Registration Act which was forged during the "Civil War" event; it is later explained that N'Kantu began to feel his service in the Howling Commandos was slavery, prompting his rebellion. He was apprehended and transported to an extra-dimensional prison called "Fantasy Island" which is located in the Negative Zone. He was transported to his cell alongside Coldblood, Speedball, and Typeface. During this time, N'Kantu informs the three that he is not alive, unnerving them in the process. When Iron Man and Spider-Man visit N'Kantu he is in his prison cell, secured to a slab and surrounded by flames; Iron Man stated that some detainees require special security measures. He was later released when Hulkling impersonated Hank Pym and used his voice to unlock all the cells of imprisoned heroes. N'Kantu then takes part in the end fight between the Pro-Registration forces and the Anti-Registration forces.

In the aftermath of "Civil War", N'Kantu returns to Egypt and recovers the Orb of Ra. He then summoned the spirit of Nephrus, hoping to get him to restore him to full life or to let him die. Nephrus was unable to do that, but it did attract Anubis when Nephrus' spirit was drawn from his realm. N'Kantu agreed to become Anubis' agent to kill people and send their souls to him in exchange for N'Kantu moving on to the afterlife.

In later appearances, N'Kantu joins the Legion of Monsters, Phil Coulson's Howling Commandos, and Dracula's Frightful Four.

== Powers and abilities ==
As a result of the transfusion of an unknown embalming fluid by the Egyptian high priest Nephrus, N'Kantu has superhuman strength and durability. He is highly resistant to many forms of attack. Although his skin is almost rock-hard in consistency, his wrappings are extremely vulnerable to fire. His blood has been replaced with an alchemical preservative that has allowed him to exist for over three thousand years. He also has no need for food, water, oxygen, or sleep.

N'Kantu is able to sense mystical energy and the use of magic. He can also sense and recognize Nephrus' descendants. His body no longer produces saliva, which makes speaking difficult and painful for him. He is nevertheless proficient in ancient Swarili, Egyptian and English. He is extremely sensitive to any dehydrative process which interferes with the preservative fluid in his veins.

He has the combat skills of the Swarili warrior class. Some of these abilities are enhanced by his mummified condition, while others are diminished.

== In other media ==
=== Television ===
- N'Kantu the Living Mummy appears in The Super Hero Squad Show episode "This Man-Thing, This Monster! (Six Against Infinity, Part 3)". This version leads an army of mummies on Dracula's behalf.
- N'Kantu the Living Mummy appears in Ultimate Spider-Man, voiced by Oded Fehr. This version is a member of the Howling Commandos.
- N'Kantu the Living Mummy appears in Hulk and the Agents of S.M.A.S.H., voiced again by Oded Fehr. This version is a member of the Howling Commandos.

=== Video games ===
- N'Kantu the Living Mummy makes a cameo appearance in Jill Valentine's ending in Marvel vs. Capcom 3: Fate of Two Worlds and Ultimate Marvel vs. Capcom 3.
- N'Kantu the Living Mummy appears as a boss and unlockable playable character in Lego Marvel Super Heroes 2.

== Reception ==
In 2015, Den of Geek ranked N'Kantu, the Living Mummy #18 on a listing of Marvel Comics' monster characters.
