= Night Shift (comics) =

Fictional team of supervillains in the Marvel Universe

Publication information
- Publisher: Marvel Comics
- First appearance: Captain America #330 (June 1987)

In-story information
- Member(s): Team leader: Superior Spider-Man; Current members: Brothers Grimm; Dansen Macabre; Digger; Gypsy Moth; Former members: Hangman; Misfit; Needle; Shroud; Tatterdemalion; Tick-Tock; Werewolf; Satannish; Waxman; Mockingbird

The Night Shift is a fictional group of criminals appearing in American comic books published by Marvel Comics. The team first appeared in Captain America #330 (June 1987). It notably includes the Brothers Grimm, Dansen Macabre, Digger, Gypsy Moth, Needle, Shroud, and Tick-Tock.

== Development ==
=== Concept and creation ===
Writer Fred Van Lente, who featured the Night Shift in Marvel Zombies 4, explained his choice of characters, stating, "The Hood doesn't just bring any group of villains with him on this jaunt. He brings a very horror-oriented group of villains with him. People know I love to dip as far back as I can into obscure Marvel-ania and a team I always enjoyed and never felt got their time was the Night Shift. So they're working for the Hood now."

=== Publication history ===
The Night Shift debuted in Captain America #330-331 (1987). The team subsequently appeared in several Marvel series, including Solo Avengers #3 (February 1988), West Coast Avengers (vol. 2) #40 (January 1989), Avengers: West Coast #76-79 (November 1991-February 1992), Captain America in issue #420 (October 1993), the "Dark Reign" storyline, getting involved in Marvel Zombies 4, where the Midnight Sons clash with the plans of Hood, Marvel Zombies 4 (2009), Moon Knight Vol. 6 #3-6 (September - December 2011), which ends with the team's death after Count Nefaria kills them for failing to defeat the Moon Knight and Echo, The Superior Octopus #1 (December 2018), and Punisher (2023).

== Fictional team biography ==
Based in California, the group is gathered and initially controlled by the Shroud. He is assisted by the Werewolf, misleading the team into believing they are forming a criminal gang; in reality, they are acting as vigilantes. The team's original lineup consists of the Brothers Grimm, Dansen Macabre, Digger, the Gypsy Moth, the Needle, the Shroud, the Tatterdemalion, Tick-Tock, and the Werewolf.

With the exceptions of Digger and the Brothers Grimm, the Shroud met the team while a fellow captive of the Locksmith. In their first appearance, they help Captain America take on the Power Broker. In West Coast Avengers (vol. 2) #40 (January 1989), Mockingbird witnesses Digger burying three criminals. She takes the four of them to the local police precinct, where they are arrested. The rest of the team respond by attacking the West Coast Avengers at their headquarters. The Night Shift is defeated, but the Shroud teleports them away. Later, the Shroud is shown with Hawkeye swapping opinions about the encounter.

Their next encounter with the West Coast Avengers occurs in Avengers: West Coast. The team is led by the Hangman, who calls on Satannish. The powers of the team are greatly increased, but in the end they are defeated anyway.

In Marvel Zombies 4, the team is under the command of the Hood. They battle the Midnight Sons, but before they can finish fighting, they are overcome by a cloud of the airborne zombie virus. The entire team is turned into zombies. Through mystical means the virus is contained, transforming the team back into their human forms and the Hood teleports them away.

Snapdragon hires the team to kill the Moon Knight on behalf of Count Nefaria, who was operating as the Kingpin of Los Angeles. When they fail and are bailed out of prison by Snapdragon's lawyer, Nefaria reduces Dansen Macabre, Digger, the Needle, the Tatterdemalion, Tick-Tock, and the Misfit to ashes.

During the Spider-Geddon storyline, Dansen Macabre and Digger turn up alive. They, the Brothers Grimm, and Skein rob a bus and its people of its valuables. In addition, they are now shown to have the Waxman as their latest member. Their robbery is interrupted by the Superior Octopus, who takes down the Night Shift with equipment designed to counter their abilities. The Superior Octopus agrees to spare them more pain in exchange that the Night Shift becomes his agents, where he will compensate them from his own funds. They agree to the terms and are ordered to return the stolen items. The Superior Octopus leaves, advising them never to cross him or they will not live long enough to regret it.

The Night Shift later helps the Superior Spider-Man in his battle against Terrax, who appears in San Francisco, California and attacks. They deliver a device from Horizon University, which the Superior Spider-Man uses to absorb some of Terrax's cosmic powers in order to defeat him. After the battle, the Night Shift assist the Superior Spider-Man in searching and rescuing survivors from the attack; however, Otto kills Waxman who turns out to be a serial killer and tries to attack a survivor.

== Members ==
- Brothers Grimm (Percy and Barton Grimes) - The Grimes brothers have the magical ability to conjure novelty weapons from their costumes. They are currently members of the Masters of Evil.
- Dansen Macabre - Dansen Macabre has the ability to hypnotize, kill or become undetectable while she is dancing. She is killed with the rest of the team by Count Nefaria for failing to kill the Moon Knight, though Dansen later turns up alive.
- Digger (Roderick Krupp) - Krupp has increased durability and seems to show no pain, regardless of the extent of his injuries. He is killed with the rest of the team by Count Nefaria for failing to kill the Moon Knight, though Digger later turns up alive.
- Gypsy Moth (Sybil Dvorak) - Dvorak possesses telekinesis, which she uses to levitate herself and manipulate fabric. She is a member of the Women Warriors, Delaware's Fifty State Initiative team.
- Needle (Josef Saint) - Saint has the ability to hypnotize people with his eye. He is killed with the rest of the team by Count Nefaria for failing to kill the Moon Knight.
- Shroud (Maximillian Coleridge) - Coleridge has the ability to summon material from the Darkforce Dimension.
- Tatterdemalion (Arnold Paffenroth) - Paffenroth has augmented strength.
- Tick-Tock - Tick-Tock has the ability to see one minute into the future.
- Werewolf (Jacob Russoff) - Russoff's lycanthropy gives him superhuman speed, strength, agility as well as sharpened senses and a healing factor. He is a member of the Midnight Sons and the Legion of Monsters.
- Hangman (Jason Roland) - Roland possesses superhuman strength and durability. He also uses a mystically enchanted rope that he can control telepathically. He joins the team in Avengers: West Coast #76 (November 1991).
- Misfit (Mitchell Godey) - Godey possesses superhuman strength and durability. He joins the team in West Coast Avengers (vol. 2) #40 (January 1989).
- Waxman - An unnamed scientist with a skin condition who made an experimental cure that turned him into a creature made of wax. He can shapeshift and smother his enemies with his waxy body. He joined the group in Superior Octopus #1.
