= Hangman (Marvel Comics) =

Hangman is the name of two fictional characters appearing in American comic books published by Marvel Comics.

== Harlan Krueger ==
Hangman

Publication information
- Publisher: Marvel Comics
- First appearance: Werewolf by Night #11 (Nov 1973)
- Created by: Marv Wolfman and Gil Kane

In-story information
- Alter ego: Harlan Krueger
- Abilities: Skilled in use of rope and scythe Extensive knowledge of American cinema

=== Fictional character biography ===
Harlan Krueger was born in Los Angeles, California. He was a fanatical moviegoer who idolized movie stars of the past (such as John Wayne, Humphrey Bogart, and Alan Ladd). He identified with these heroic figures, developing a simplistic view of good and evil in real life, deciding that evildoers should pay for their crimes with their lives.

After being court-martialed from the army for torturing prisoners of war, Krueger resolves to take the law into his own hands and becomes the masked vigilante Hangman. His modus operandi involves executing male criminals while leaving female ones alive but imprisoned to 'protect them' from corruption; many die of starvation while in captivity. After years of stalking criminals with a noose and scythe, he comes into conflict with Werewolf by Night.

Hangman next stalks one of the Brothers Grimm, who had been stealing from diamond merchants. Mistaking one Brother Grimm (Jake) for his target (William), he pursues him to a pyrotechnics building and sees him seemingly die in an explosion. Hangman is among the criminals captured by Locksmith and Tick-Tock.

While attending a Hollywood costume party held for the premiere of a horror movie to 'purge' yet more 'unworthy souls' (in other words, target members of the film industry for execution), the Hangman kills a disguised woman, thus inadvertently violating his own moral code. As he kneels over the corpse in remorse, he is stabbed and killed by Matthew O'Brien, a film critic who intended to stop his latest killing spree.

=== Powers and abilities ===
Harlan Krueger was an athletic man with no superhuman powers. He carried a 30-foot (9.1 m) length of half-inch hemp rope, terminating in a hangman's noose. He also used a harvesting scythe with an eight-foot wooden handle and curved four-foot single-edged steel blade. He received Army hand-to-hand combat training.

Krueger had extensive knowledge of American cinema, particularly the films of the 1930s, 1940s, and 1950s.

== Jason Roland ==
Hangman

Publication information
- Publisher: Marvel Comics
- First appearance: Tower of Shadows #5 (May, 1970)
- Created by: Roy Thomas and Barry Smith

In-story information
- Alter ego: Jason Roland
- Team affiliations: Night Shift; Lethal Legion
- Abilities: Magically enhanced physical attributes and virtually indestructible rope Ability to levitate and climb rope without attaching it Mind-link with Satannish

=== Fictional character biography ===
Jason Roland is an aspiring actor who made a pact with a demon (later revealed to be Satannish) to make his career successful. He is trapped in a monstrous form and hid out for years. He eventually encounters the Night Shift and convinces them to deal with Satannish to increase their powers. They are defeated by the Avengers West Coast.

Satannish later uses the Hangman as part of his Lethal Legion, made up of some of the most notorious figures in history given superhuman powers; for example, Joseph Stalin was transformed into the giant Coldsteel. Mephisto aids the Avengers West Coast in defeating Satannish and his minions.

Much later, Hangman surfaces again when a demon named Bloodbath revealed that his former wife had sired a son he did not know about. Bloodbath forces Hangman to kill people for him for a while until X-Factor Investigations learns out about the killings and battle, then help Hangman.

=== Powers and abilities ===
As Hangman, Roland had magically enhanced physical abilities, including strength and durability, making him strong enough to fight Wonder Man. His rope was enhanced magically to make it practically indestructible. He was also able to levitate his rope and can climb the rope even if it is not attached to any other objects. Roland remained in nearly constant contact with Satannish, who could further enhance his powers if needed.
