= Tatterdemalion =

- Tatterdemalion (bottom) on the cover of Werewolf By Night #9, Sept 1973.

Publication information
- Publisher: Marvel Comics
- First appearance: Werewolf by Night #9 (September 1973)
- Created by: Tom Sutton

In-story information
- Alter ego: Arnold Paffenroth
- Team affiliations: Thunderbolts; Committee; Night Shift
- Notable aliases: Tatterdemalion; Michael Wyatt
- Abilities: Special coating makes difficult to hold; Peak physical condition

Arnold Paffenroth is a character appearing in American comic books published by Marvel Comics. Created by writer Gerry Conway and artist Tom Sutton, the character first appeared in Werewolf by Night #9 (September 1973). Once a talented tap dancer for the movies, Paffenroth lost his career and fortune, suffering a mental breakdown that ultimately drove him into a life of crime. He is known under the codename Tatterdemalion, and has been a member of the Night Shift and Thunderbolts at various points in his history.

== Development ==
=== Concept and creation ===
Arnold Paffenroth wears gloves either coated with or secreting a chemical agent capable of dissolving any material made of paper, such as dollar bills. His appearance—and his name, which roughly translates to "ragged tramp"—suggests homelessness, and he is portrayed as being apparently insane.

=== Publication history ===
Arnold Paffenroth debuted in Werewolf by Night #9 (September 1973), created by Gerry Conway and Tom Sutton. He subsequently appeared in several Marvel series, including Dazzler (1981). He is also referenced in Marvel Team-Up (1972).

== Fictional character biography ==
Arnold Paffenroth was born in Las Vegas, Nevada, and became a tap-dancer and an actor. He was once a wealthy business investor until the Las Vegas mob swindled him out of all of his money. This resulted in his divorce, and he became an insane homeless person. With an army of derelicts, hired by Sidney Sarnak on behalf of the Committee, he battled the Werewolf. The Committee outfitted Paffenroth with a sophisticated costume and equipment. Taking the name "Tatterdemalion" (a person dressed in ragged clothing), he sneaked up on unsuspecting victims and proceeded to destroy their money, rather than steal it; an odd twist on mugging. Tatterdemalion began attacking the wealthy, and then battled Werewolf and the superhero Spider-Man. He next battled Werewolf and Ghost Rider. With other superhuman adventurers and criminals, he was imprisoned by the Locksmith, but was then freed by Spider-Woman. He later attempted to stimulate the career of Julia Walker, his former dance partner, by committing terrorism. He battled and was stopped by Dazzler.

Tatterdemalion later joined the Night Shift, a group of villains tricked by the Shroud into doing good. He teamed with Captain America against the Power Broker and his augmented mutates. Alongside the Night Shift, he tested Moon Knight to take over as leader of the Night Shift. Alongside the Night Shift, he battled the West Coast Avengers. His abilities were enhanced by Satannish's black magic at this time. At present, he is more occupied with shielding his thoughts from the space aliens who are trying to control his mind with radio signals; he believes they transmit these signals into his head via the smoke stacks of fast food restaurants.

=== Civil War ===
In the Civil War storyline, Tatterdemalion was among the supervillains who were apprehended and given a choice between jail or assisting the Thunderbolts.

=== Marvel Zombies ===
Tatterdemalion appears with the Night Shift, as part of the Hood's gang. They battle the Midnight Sons, and Tatterdemalion fights Werewolf by Night before he is blasted by Daimon Hellstrom. He and the Night Shift are killed when the zombie virus mutates and becomes airborne. The virus cloud begins to rain blood, and reanimates the Night Shift as zombies. Dormammu assumes control of the Night Shift and uses them to fight the Midnight Sons. When Jennifer Kale and the Black Talon contain the virus within the Zombie (Simon Garth), the Night Shift members, albeit still in an undead condition, cease their rampage. The Hood teleports away with them.

== Powers and abilities ==
Arnold Paffenroth relies on skill, agility, and specialized equipment to fight. A trained tap dancer and performer, he is exceptionally agile and coordinated, with strength, stamina, and reflexes at the athletic level of a professional dancer. He is also a capable hand-to-hand combatant. Paffenroth is mentally disturbed and obsessed with eradicating greed and excess, often targeting the wealthy and using his solvent to destroy their money and expensive clothing. He wears special gloves coated with an unknown, self-replicating solvent capable of dissolving paper, fabric, and other similar materials, though his own clothing is impervious to it. His outfit and scarf are treated with a greasy substance that makes him extremely slippery and difficult to grab. He layers multiple pieces of clothing, including a hidden Kevlar layer that protects him from small-caliber gunfire. At times, he has worn a cloak containing chloroform capsules that he can release manually. His primary weapon is a long scarf with lead weights sewn into the ends, which he uses to strike or entangle opponents.
