= List of West Coast Avengers members =

The West Coast Avengers were created as an expansion of the main Avengers team, when The Vision appointed Hawkeye as the West Coast chair in Avengers vol. 1 #243. The team first appeared in the 1984 limited series West Coast Avengers (vol 1.) and returned in the ongoing series West Coast Avengers (vol 2.) published from 1985 to 1994.

The West Coast Avengers (vol. 3) series was relaunched in 2018 as part of Fresh Start publishing initiative with a new roster. A fourth volume began publication in November 2024 with a new West Coast Avengers roster.

== Volumes 1 and 2 (1984–1994) ==
=== Founders ===
Character	Real Name	Joined in	Notes
Hawkeye a.k.a. Goliath, Ronin	Clinton Francis Barton	West Coast Avengers #1 (September 1984)	Originally joined in Avengers #16 (May 1965). Current member of the main Avengers team, and the Secret Avengers.
Mockingbird	Barbara "Bobbi" Barton (née Morse)	West Coast Avengers #1 (September 1984)	Former member of the New Avengers and the Secret Avengers.
War Machine a.k.a. Iron Man 2.0, Iron Patriot	James Rupert "Rhodey" Rhodes	West Coast Avengers #1 (September 1984)	Rejoined as War Machine in Avengers West Coast #94 (May 1993). Former member of the Secret Avengers.
Wonder Man	Simon Williams	West Coast Avengers #1 (September 1984)	Originally joined in Avengers #182 (April 1979). Former member of the Avengers Unity Squad.
Tigra a.k.a. The Cat	Greer Grant Nelson	West Coast Avengers #1 (September 1984)	Originally joined in Avengers #211 (September 1981).

=== Recruits ===
Avengers members recruited by Hawkeye as the West Coast Avengers chair.

Character	Real Name	Joined in	Notes
Iron Man	Anthony Edward "Tony" Stark	West Coast Avengers vol. 2 #1 (October 1985)	Originally joined in Avengers #1 (September 1963). Expelled for Armor War.
The Thing	Benjamin Jacob Grimm	West Coast Avengers vol. 2 #9 (June 1986)	Accepted membership after assisting West Coast team, but left before official vote was taken. Former member of the New Avengers.
Hank Pym a.k.a. Ant Man, Giant-Man, Goliath, Yellowjacket	Dr. Henry "Hank" Jonathan Pym	West Coast Avengers vol. 2 #21 (June 1987)	Originally joined in Avengers #1 (September 1963). One of only two members, the other being Kelsey Leigh (Captain Britain), who have Avengers status in both their civilian and superhero guises.
Moon Knight	Marc Spector, Steven Grant and Jake Lockley	West Coast Avengers vol. 2 #21 (June 1987)	Gained full membership in West Coast Avengers vol. 2 #33. Former member of the Secret Avengers.
Firebird a.k.a. Espirita	Bonita Juárez	West Coast Avengers Annual #2 (1987)	Given reserve status after assisting West Coast team.
The Wasp	Janet van Dyne (a.k.a. Janet Pym)	West Coast Avengers vol. 2 #32 (May 1988)	Originally joined in Avengers #1 (September 1963). Current member of the Avengers Unity Squad.
Scarlet Witch	Wanda Maximoff (a.k.a. Wanda Frank)	West Coast Avengers vol. 2 #37 (October 1988)	Originally joined in Avengers #16 (May 1965). Current member of the Avengers.
Vision	Victor Shade (alias)	West Coast Avengers vol. 2 #37 (October 1988)	Originally joined in Avengers #58 (November 1968). Current member of the Avengers.

=== Other recruits ===
Character	Real Name	Joined in	Notes
U.S. Agent a.k.a. Super-Patriot, Captain America	John Frank Walker, Jack Daniels (alias)	West Coast Avengers vol. 2 #44 (May 1989)	Appointed to West Coast team by government. Left during UN Charter, and later gained official membership.
Human Torch	Jim Hammond (alias)	Avengers West Coast #50 (November 1989)	
Quicksilver	Pietro Django Maximoff (a.k.a. Pietro Frank)	Avengers West Coast #56 (March 1990)	Originally joined in Avengers #16 (May 1965).
Machine Man a.k.a. X-51	Aaron Stack (alias)	Avengers West Coast #69 (April 1991)	Given reserve status after assisting West Coast team. Active in Avengers West Coast #83 (June 1992). Removed from roster in X-51 #4 (1999).
Living Lightning	Miguel Santos	Avengers West Coast #74 (September 1991)	
Spider-Woman a.k.a. Arachne	Julia Carpenter	Avengers West Coast #74 (September 1991)	
Darkhawk	Christopher Powell	Avengers West Coast #94 (May 1993)	Joined as a reserve member.

=== Honorary ===
Heroes that have been granted honorary status during their lifetime or posthumously for acts of great courage or sacrifice.

Character	Real Name	Joined in	Notes
Moira Brandon		Avengers West Coast vol. 2 #100 (November 1993)	Honorary founding member of the West Coast Team. Status given in flashback taking place before West Coast Avengers vol. 1.

== Volume 3 roster (2018 series) ==
Character	Real Name	Joined in	Notes
Hawkeye	Kate Bishop	West Coast Avengers Vol. 3 #1 (October 2018)	Team leader; former member of the Young Avengers
Hawkeye	Clinton Barton	West Coast Avengers Vol. 3 #1 (October 2018)	
Fuse	Johnny Watts	West Coast Avengers Vol. 3 #1 (October 2018)	
Miss America	America Chavez	West Coast Avengers Vol. 3 #1 (October 2018)	Former member of the Ultimates and Young Avengers
Gwenpool	Gwen Poole	West Coast Avengers Vol. 3 #1 (October 2018)	
Kid Omega	Quentin Quire	West Coast Avengers Vol. 3 #1 (October 2018)	Former member of the Xavier Institute
Jeff the Land Shark	Jeff	West Coast Avengers Vol. 3 #8 (January 2019)	First appeared in West Coast Avengers Vol. 3 #7, and was added to the team in West Coast Avengers #8
Alloy	Ramone Watts	West Coast Avengers Vol. 3 #10 (June 2019)	

== Volume 4 roster (2024 series) ==
Character	Real Name	Joined in	Notes
Iron Man	Anthony Edward "Tony" Stark	West Coast Avengers Vol. 4 #1 (November 2024)	Team leader
War Machine	James "Rhodey" Rhodes	West Coast Avengers Vol. 4 #1 (November 2024)	
Spider-Woman	Jessica Drew	West Coast Avengers Vol. 4 #1 (November 2024)	
Firestar	Angelica "Angel" Jones	West Coast Avengers Vol. 4 #1 (November 2024)	Leaves the team in issue #5
Ultron		West Coast Avengers Vol. 4 #1 (November 2024)	
Blue Bolt	Chad Braxton	West Coast Avengers Vol. 4 #1 (November 2024)	On loan via a prison release program

== See also ==
- List of Avengers members
