= Skein (character) =

Marvel Comics character

- Skein

Publication information
- Publisher: Marvel Comics
- First appearance: Spider-Woman #10 (January 1979)
- Created by: Mark Gruenwald; Carmine Infantino

In-story information
- Alter ego: Sybil Dvorak
- Species: Human Mutant
- Team affiliations: Night Shift; Masters of Evil; Thunderbolts; Women Warriors; Menagerie
- Notable aliases: Gypsy Moth, Sybarite
- Abilities: Telekinesis; Levitation

Skein (real name Sybil Dvorak, also known as Gypsy Moth and Sybarite) is a supervillain appearing in American comic books published by Marvel Comics.

== Publication history ==
The character first appeared in Spider-Woman #10 as Gypsy Moth, and was created by Mark Gruenwald and Carmine Infantino.

== Fictional character biography ==
Sybil Dvorak was born in Focșani, Romania, in the shadow of the Carpathians. She was raised by Romani and spent much of her time alone nurturing her gardens and focusing on her mutant powers of telekinesis. She loved how the sensation of fiber, such as soft weaves and flowers, felt to her mental touch; hard objects felt abrasive to her.

Wandering onto the set of a remake of Dracula, which is being filmed on location in Romania, Dvorak meets the film's star, Jason Reed. He romances her and convinces her to come with him back to his home in Los Angeles. Dvorak is essentially a prisoner in the house, as she was an illegal immigrant and Reed will not marry her. Reed is constantly away on "trips", and Dvorak fears that he is having affairs. Dvorak creates a costume using her powers, begins calling herself Gypsy Moth, and directs her feelings of anger and betrayal by attacking Hollywood social gatherings. Jessica Drew (Spider-Woman) confronts Gypsy Moth and offers her friendship, but she tries to kill her in response, insisting she has no use for friends. Drew's boyfriend, S.H.I.E.L.D. Agent Jerry Hunt, shoots Gypsy Moth, knocking her unconscious. However, Spider-Woman flies Gypsy Moth away from the party so that the authorities will not take her.

Soon after, Dvorak manages to obtain American citizenship and an inclusion in Jason Reed's will. When he dies of an apparent obstructed blood vessel in his heart, she inherits his home and his wealth.

Gypsy Moth

Dvorak takes on the name of Sybarite and uses her assets to start a hedonistic cult, giving her followers illegal drugs in return for soft garments and animal bodies. Her followers capture Spider-Woman, who manages to stop Gypsy Moth. However, the two are kidnapped by Locksmith and Tick-Tock. Gypsy Moth is forced to work with her nemesis in order to escape.

The Shroud, another fellow prisoner of Locksmith, tracks Gypsy Moth down and recruits her into the Night Shift, a band of Los Angeles–based villains. The Night Shift uses the Los Angeles sewer system to move about the city; when the sewers are overrun with the mutated test subjects of the Power Broker, Shroud employs the Night Shift in ending Power Broker's operations. Gypsy Moth later serves as a member of Superia's Femizons.

Gypsy Moth later leaves the Night Shift and joins the Crimson Cowl's Masters of Evil. Gypsy Moth aids the Masters of Evil in their search for Justin Hammer's legacy, a bio-toxin which could kill thousands of superhumans. Hawkeye attempts to convince Gypsy Moth and most of her teammates to switch sides, and to aide him in preventing the Crimson Cowl from obtaining the toxin. Gypsy Moth sided with Hawkeye "for kicks", designs a new costume for herself, and changes her codename to Skein. As a part of Hawkeye's team of Thunderbolts, Skein helps thwart the Crimson Cowl by effectively unraveling the Crimson Cowl's costume, rendering her powerless.

During the Dark Reign storyline, Skein is revealed to have joined the Women Warriors, the Initiative's team for the state of Delaware.

During the Spider-Island storyline, Sybil Dvorak returns to the Gypsy Moth identity as well as her life of crime upon creating a new costume. After being hired by the Spider Queen to kidnap Alicia Masters, she uses her powers to seal Spider-Woman's mouth shut and change her costume into another Gypsy Moth suit, which leads to the Thing mistakenly attacking Spider-Woman. After removing her gag and mask, Spider-Woman manages to defeat Spider-Queen and rescue Alicia.

Skein later appears as a member of the Menagerie alongside Hippo, White Rabbit, and Panda-Mania. When White Rabbit refers to her as "Gypsy Moth", she insists on being called Skein. White Rabbit protests this, stating that she called the group the Menagerie because of the villains being themed after animals.

During the "Spider-Geddon" storyline, Skein is seen with Night Shift members Digger, Dansen Macabre, the Brothers Grimm, and new member Waxman when they rob a bus. The group is thwarted by Superior Octopus, who makes them agree to become his agents.

== Powers and abilities ==
Sybil Dvorak is a mutant who possesses the ability to telekinetically manipulate materials and objects with her mind. Because all matter has a powerful and specific "texture" to her mind, she prefers to only manipulate "soft" substances like fibers and other malleable, yielding substances (this preference extends to the point of her having a strong aversion to mentally manipulating anything hard or solid). Thus she confines her manipulation to such substances as fabrics (both organic and synthetic) and organic tissue such as that of plants or animals. The maximum amount of material she can manipulate at once is equivalent to the amount of weight she can lift physically. By concentrating, she can levitate herself and move through the air as if she were swimming, at up to a top speed of 20 miles per hour for periods of up to a half-hour before tiring from the mental exertion. She can carry loads weighing no more than her own body weight while airborne.

Dvorak's wings were initially depicted as part of her body. In later appearances, her wings are instead depicted as made from fiber and manipulated by her powers.
