= Digger (Marvel Comics) =

Marvel Comics character

Digger is the name of two fictional characters appearing in American comic books published by Marvel Comics.

The Roderick Krupp version of Digger first appeared as a story narrator/host in the horror anthology series Tower of Shadows #1 (September 1969), in the story "At the Stroke of Midnight" by writer-artist Jim Steranko.

== Publication history ==
Originally designed as one of the hosts of Tower of Shadows and its sister title, Chamber of Darkness, both beginning in 1969, the Roderick Krupp version of Digger played a role similar to that of Tales from the Crypt's Crypt Keeper of the 1950s EC Comics and later HBO television series. Providing a panel or two of introductory material leading into and usually closing the story itself, Digger appeared sporadically through the nine-issue run of Tower of Shadows and the eight-issue run of Chamber of Darkness. Digger was worked into Marvel's main shared universe, the Marvel Universe in 1987, returning with other lesser-known characters in Captain America #329 (May 1987). He appeared with these other characters as a member of the team the Night Shift, supervillain antagonists who were then primarily used in the series Avengers West Coast during the 1990s. Digger appeared as part of the "Night Shift" entry in The Official Handbook of the Marvel Universe Update '89 #5. After a long period in which the character had no appearances, a new version of Digger appeared in 2008. Returning to his roots, he was used as the narrator for Dead of Night featuring the Man-Thing, a four-issue miniseries published by Marvel as a part of its mature content MAX imprint. In this series, Digger tells his version of the Man-Thing's origin, as well as three other semi-connected tales starring Man-Thing and related characters. The Digger sequences in the miniseries were painted by artist Nick Percival. In 2009, Digger appeared in Marvel Zombies 4. This series also featured the character's death and resurrection.

The Gamma Mutate incarnation of Digger first appeared in The Amazing Spider-Man (vol. 2) #51 and was created by J. Michael Straczynski and John Romita Jr.

== Fictional character biography ==
=== Roderick Krupp ===
Digger
- First page from Dead of Night Featuring the Man-Thing #3; Art by Nick Percival

Publication information
- Publisher: Marvel Comics
- First appearance: Tower of Shadows #1 (September 1969)

In-story information
- Alter ego: Roderick Krupp
- Species: Human
- Team affiliations: Night Shift
- Abilities: Superhuman strength and durability Regeneration

Roderick Krupp is a serial killer who buries his victims alive while telling them macabre stories, and becomes known as Digger for his modus operandi. While living in a decrepit Los Angeles mansion known as the Tower of Shadows, he is contacted by the vigilante Shroud and joins the supervillain team Night Shift.

Digger and the Night Shift are hired by Snapdragon to kill Moon Knight on behalf of Count Nefaria, who is operating as the Kingpin of Los Angeles. Nefaria kills Digger and the Night Shift when they fail to do so.

During the "Spider-Geddon" storyline, Digger and Dansen Macabre turn up alive as they, the Brothers Grimm, Skein, and Waxman rob a bus. They are thwarted by the Superior Octopus, who recruits them to become his agents.

=== Gamma mutate ===
Digger

Publication information
- Publisher: Marvel Comics
- First appearance: The Amazing Spider-Man (vol. 2) #51 (May 2003)
- Created by: J. Michael Straczynski; John Romita Jr.

In-story information
- Alter ego: Freddie Carnevale, Santo Castellani, Jimmy Desanti, Louis Fredone, Tony Mascapone, George Sims, and their chief lieutenants
- Species: Composite gamma mutate
- Team affiliations: Sinister Syndicate
- Abilities: Superhuman strength, speed, agility and durability Possesses the combined memories and skills of their components Via Green Door: Immortality via resurrection

On July 3, 1957, gangsters Morris Forelli, Freddie Carnevale, Santo Castellani, Jimmy Desanti, Louis Fredone, Tony Mascapone, and their lieutenants meet in Las Vegas in an attempt to resolve a conflict between two mafias. Having learned that his own lieutenant, George Sims, is working for a rival crime family, Forelli kills him and the other gangsters and buries them in an isolated part of the Nevada desert. The gangsters' murder becomes a legendary tale, with the group being collectively referred to as the Vegas Thirteen.

Decades later, an experimental gamma bomb is detonated in the desert, fusing the Vegas Thirteen's corpses into a composite gamma mutate who plans revenge on Forelli. Spider-Man deduces that Digger's body uses a vast amount of energy and manipulates them into using up all their energy, which kills them.

In the sixth volume of The Amazing Spider-Man (2022), Digger returns as a member of Rose's gang. Digger states that they returned from the dead via the Green Door, which allows all gamma mutates to resurrect after death.

During the "Gang War" storyline, Beetle leads the Sinister Syndicate to Sugar Hill, Manhattan to claim it from Diamondback and encounter Rose and Digger. As soldiers working for Wilson Fisk take Rose away, Digger recovers from the attack. Digger is seen with the Sinister Syndicate and their allies during a conflict with the Maggia. During the battle in Central Park, Digger tackles Count Nefaria. They and Beetle are blasted by Madame Masque's gauntlets, but recover by the time Spider-Man and his allies arrive.

== Powers and abilities ==
Both incarnations of Digger possess superhuman physical abilities.

The Roderick Krupp incarnation of Digger can also regenerate after being cut to pieces and wields a shovel, made with a special alloy spade capable of breaching concrete.

The gamma mutate incarnation of Digger can resurrect via the Green Door and possesses the combined memories and skills of their components.
