= Werewolf by Night =

Marvel Comics character

- Jack Russell as Werewolf by Night as seen on the cover of Legion of Monsters: Werewolf by Night #1. Art by Greg Land.

Publication information
- Publisher: Marvel Comics
- First appearance: Marvel Spotlight #2 (February 1972)
- Created by: Roy Thomas; Jean Thomas; Gerry Conway; Mike Ploog

In-story information
- Alter ego: Jack Russell (born Jacob Russoff)
- Species: Werewolf
- Team affiliations: Legion of Monsters; Midnight Sons; Night Shift
- Abilities: Superhuman strength, speed, stamina, reflexes, agility, coordination, durability, and acute senses; Razor-sharp claws and teeth; Accelerated healing factor

The Werewolf by Night (also known as the Werewolf) is a fictional character and werewolf appearing in American comic books published by Marvel Comics. Werewolf by Night is the alias of Jack Russell, who first appeared in Marvel Spotlight #2 (February 1972).

Werewolf by Night appeared in the Marvel Cinematic Universe TV special Werewolf by Night (2022), portrayed by Gael García Bernal.

== Publication history ==
Prior to the formation of the Comics Code Authority in 1954, Marvel's predecessor Atlas Comics published a five-page short story titled "Werewolf by Night!" in Marvel Tales (1949 series) #116 (July 1953 issue). With the relaxation of the Comics Code Authority's rules in 1971, it became possible for the first time to publish code-approved comic books with werewolves. The Jack Russell version of Werewolf by Night first appeared in Marvel Spotlight #2 (February 1972) and was based on an idea by Roy Thomas. The series name was suggested by Stan Lee and the initial creative team was Gerry Conway and Mike Ploog, who worked from a plot by Roy and Jean Thomas for the first issue. Readers have often pointed out that the lead character's name, Jack Russell, is also a breed of dog. Conway has said that while he does not remember how he came up with the name, it is unlikely that he was making this canine reference consciously, since he did not own a dog and never lived with one growing up.

After the test run in Marvel Spotlight #2-4, the character graduated to his own eponymous series in September 1972. Conway described working on the series as "a lot of fun" because the horror genre made a refreshing change from the superhero stories that had been the staple of mainstream comics for years. Werewolf by Night was published for 43 issues and ran through March 1977. During the series' run, the editorship could not resist the opportunity to assign one of their most popular writers, Marv Wolfman, to write some stories for the series with a playful note: "At last -- WEREWOLF -- written by a WOLFMAN."

Issue #32 (August 1975) contains the first appearance of the Moon Knight. Jack Russell co-starred with Tigra in Giant-Size Creatures #1 (July 1974), which was the first appearance of Greer Grant Nelson as Tigra instead of as the Cat. That series was retitled Giant-Size Werewolf with its second issue. Jack Russell was dormant for most of the 1980s. The character's appearance was radically revamped in Moon Knight #29 (March 1983). He guest-starred in various issues of Spider-Woman, West Coast Avengers, and Doctor Strange: Sorcerer Supreme. The Werewolf by Night was later revived in the pages of Marvel Comics Presents, where he appeared irregularly from 1991 to 1993. He made regular appearances as a supporting cast member in the pages of Morbius: The Living Vampire from 1993 to 1995. A letters page in an issue of Morbius mentioned that a Werewolf by Night miniseries by Len Kaminski and James Fry was in the works, but the miniseries was never published. Werewolf by Night vol. 2 ran for six issues in 1998. The series was written by Paul Jenkins and penciled by Leonardo Manco. After the book's cancellation, the story was continued in the pages of Strange Tales, which also featured the Man-Thing. That volume of Strange Tales was canceled after only two issues due to poor sales. In early 2007, Marvel published a one-shot entitled Legion of Monsters: Werewolf by Night, with art by Greg Land. In January 2009, Jack Russell was featured in the four-issue limited series Dead of Night Featuring Werewolf by Night, from Marvel's mature readers MAX imprint. The series was written by Duane Swierczynski and drawn by Mico Suayan. He was featured as a member of the Midnight Sons team led by Morbius in Marvel Zombies 4 in 2009.

== Fictional character biography ==
While reports of lycanthropy (shapeshifting into a werewolf) in the Russoff line stretch back many centuries, the first confirmed manifestation was Grigori Russoff in 1795. Dracula slew Grigori's wife Louisa after he refused to acknowledge Dracula's primacy upon his return to Transylvania. Grigori then ambushed and destroyed Dracula, but was mutated into a werewolf by Lydia, a werewolf formerly imprisoned by the vampire lord. Grigori took a second wife and accounts vary as to why lycanthropy did not pass to his descendants. Sometime prior to May 1930 Grigori's descendant Gregor obtained the legendary Darkhold scrolls, binding them back into book form. Reading lycanthropy's origins in the Darkhold under a full moon triggered the dormant curse, mutating Gregor. He further transcribed much of the Darkhold into Grigori's diary, essentially creating a Darkhold copy which he used as his own diary. Gregor sold part of his estate — including Wundagore Mountain — to Jonathon Drew, who shared it with partner Herbert Wyndham (the future High Evolutionary). The Russoff werewolf slew Jonathon's wife Merriem while Wyndham designed a suit of silver-coated armor to protect himself, enabling Russoff's capture. Russoff stayed with the Evolutionary who kept the werewolf safely contained for decades. Russoff eventually used the Darkhold to summon Chthon to cure him. The Elder God nearly broke through the earthly plane; Magnus the Sorcerer forced Russoff to banish Chthon, who lashed out and slew Gregor. The Gregor Russoff who stayed with the High Evolutionary seems to have been the grandfather (or great-grandfather) of Jack Russell. Having the same name and presumably using the same diary, contributed to earlier confusion.

Decades later another Gregor Russoff married Laura, the former girlfriend of his younger brother Philip. Jacob was born in Mediaș, Transylvania soon after, and Laura was pregnant with Lissa within two years of marriage. When lightning struck Russoff's Transylvanian castle during a full moon, the werewolf Gregor escaped confinement and began attacking villagers and ended up killed by silver bullets. Gregor's mother Maria was stoned and driven from the village, living with gypsies and learning magic. After Gregor's death, Laura found his brother Philip again (who had moved to Los Angeles and anglicized his name to Russell) and they married after a year.

Approximately 15 years later, the criminal organization known as the Committee learned of Gregor's curse and blackmailed Philip, threatening to reveal the secret. To protect Laura's name, Philip intended to pay them but had second thoughts and canceled, causing the Committee to send Max Grant after Laura. Critically injured in a car crash on her son Jack's 18th birthday, Laura barely had time to tell him about his true father and the werewolf curse. She made Jack promise not to harm Philip, before dying. Having inherited lycanthropy the night before, Jack slew Max Grant, yet blamed Philip for his mother's death for some time. Laura left Castle Russoff in Jack's name, but Philip sold the castle to Miles Blackgar who had it moved to an island off the California coast. Jack battled a motorcycle gang, infecting its members with lycanthropy.

Jack spent the next few years as a traveler, shapeshifting into a savage werewolf on the three nights of the full moon. He learned of the Darkhold from Nathan and Agatha Timly who briefly kidnapped the Werewolf only to meet grisly ends. Befriending writer Buck Cowan, Jack snuck into Blackgar's castle and stole the Darkhold. There he encountered Miles Blackgar and his daughter Marlene, whose petrifying power slew both Blackgars. After fighting off the deformed Cephalos' plot to drain his power to stabilize Cephalos' form, Jack had Father Ramon Joaquez translate the Darkhold. The priest died after being possessed by the Darkhold's former custodian, the 12th-century mad monk Aelfric, and the Darkhold vanished.

Jack encountered Joshua Kane and his brother Luther, who hunted the Werewolf and offered to prevent Lissa from mutating into a werewolf in exchange for Jack kidnapping billionaire-turned-recluse Judson Hemp. Jack met mentalist Swami Rihva who sought the Werewolf's blood to reveal the treasure map of the ancient sorcerer Kaman-Ru on his "Bloodstone", the possessing demon Krogg, and Spider-Man and Moondark the Magician.

Jack then fought the sonic-weapons of Sarnak, his first brush with the criminal organization known as the Committee, who wished to enslave the Werewolf.

After fighting the sociopathic Hangman (Harlan Krueger), Jack was entranced by Topaz, the familiar of the sorcerer Taboo, who sought the Darkhold. Taboo had used the tome decades before to grant his son Algon a golden touch, but had lost the book in mid-spell, trapping Algon in a mindless state. Lacking the Darkhold, Taboo transferred Philip Russell's mind into Algon but both Algon and Taboo died, restoring Philip, who explained Laura's death and reconciled with both Jack and Lissa. Traveling to Transylvania alongside Topaz, Jack discovered the Russoff diary/Darkhold copy, the Werewolf battled Dracula and the book was lost in the Alps. Jack and Topaz encountered the kyphotic Half-Mad before returning to the U.S. where Jack fought the Committee's Behemoth robot and then Ma Mayhem, assisted by werewolf Raymond Coker. Jack joined the newly mutated Tigra against Hydra, battled vampires Louis Belski and Liza Pyne, opposed Ma Mayhem and her ally Baron Thunder, and joined Coker against Lou Hackett (a corrupt policeman who could also shapeshift into a werewolf by using a magic ring). The Werewolf joined the Frankenstein Monster against the Satanic Brotherhood of Baal who had abducted Lissa, then fought the disfigured Atlas and the Jekyll/Hyde-like DePrayve.

Jack briefly returned to Transylvania following Topaz's psychic summons and encountered Maria Russoff, who used Gypsy magic to raise zombies against the villagers who had driven her off. Maria sacrificed herself to save Jack from her zombies upon learning that he was her grandson.

In Blackgar's castle, the Werewolf, Topaz and the repentant spirit fragment of Taboo battled the necromancer Doctor Glitternight, who mutated Lissa Russell into a were-demoness. The process of curing Lissa also purged her of the threat of lycanthropy, though she would still pass it on to her children. After battling Morbius, the Living Vampire and slaying the demon worshipped by Brad Wrangle, the Werewolf was briefly transported to the divided dimension Biphasia by Satanist Joaquin Zaire where he aided Paingloss against the sorcerer Sardanus. During a subsequent ski trip, the Werewolf nearly slew Buck Cowan after which he was captured by the Committee-paid mercenary known as the Moon Knight, who set him free when he realized Jack's humanity and the Committee's intentions. The Werewolf then joined the Ghost Rider, the Man-Thing, and Morbius in unwittingly slaying the benevolent alien Starseed, who had intended to cure them all. The Werewolf, Topaz and others then battled and were nearly driven mad by the ghost of 19th-century black magician Belaric Marcosa, but they freed the trapped spirits of Marcosa's victims, who destroyed him. One of the grateful spirits, magician Gideon Blaine, healed Buck. The enigmatic Three Who Are All (the Hooded One, the Burning Snake and the Goat Child) — an ancient extra-dimensional group — sent Jack, Topaz, Raymond Coker and Brother Voodoo to Haiti, where the Werewolf and Fire-Eyes destroyed former group member Glitternight once and for all. In the process, Jack gained control of his Werewolf persona to the extent that he only shapeshifted under moonlight and still lost control during the three nights of the full moon.

The Werewolf joined with Iron Man against the Maggia's Masked Marauder and his Tri-Animan and he teamed with Spider-Woman against the mercenary the Enforcer. The mad scientist Karl Malus captured and performed scientific experiments on Russell to control him and use him against Spider-Woman; Russell escaped and apprehended Malus with the aid of Spider-Woman. Russell joined Spider-Man against the Tatterdemalion, a former agent of Sarnak. After being temporarily captured alongside a number of costumed adventurers by the Locksmith and Tick-Tock, Russell began mutating into a more savage and lupine form, a late effect from Malus' treatment. He fled Satanists Morning Star (Schuyler Belial) and his Left Hand Path, who wished to use his blood to mutate into werewolves, then sought aid from the now-human Michael Morbius in controlling his savage self, leading to a battle with the West Coast Avengers. With assistance from Iron Man, he later saved Lissa from Morgan Le Fay's attempt to possess her. He was subsequently mind-controlled into joining the mostly-criminal Night Shift by Dansen Macabre. Russell was the only member who knew their leader, the Shroud, was using the group to oppose other criminals and to prevent them from harming innocents. After encounters with Captain America, the Moon Knight and the Avengers, the Werewolf eventually developed resistance to Macabre's powers and turned on the Night Shift, after which he went solo. After briefly battling the Hulk in the Midwest, Jack contacted his father Gregor's spirit to cure his lycanthropy, but was told that he would die unless he accepted his beast. During the ensuing battle with the religious zealot Silver Dagger and the Braineaters, a cult of werewolves mutated in the past by Russell, Jack fully accepted his wolf-self and his personae merged, altering his powers and granting him full control.

Russell assisted Doctor Strange against the alien Possessors, the Night Shift against an L.A. street gang and the Ghost Rider against a new group of Braineaters; Jack battles with Sabretooth but before Jack can kill Sabretooth, three locals show up with rifles and save Sabretooth by shooting at Jack. and fought an unidentified Wendigo in Canada. Russell was captured by criminal scientist Nightshade who used his blood to create the Night Patrol, a group of werewolves in Starkesboro, Massachusetts. Captain America - also mutated into a werewolf - freed Russell and led the werewolves to defeat Nightshade's master, Dredmund the Druid, who had used the Godstone (the former gem of the Man-Wolf) to briefly mutate into the powerful Starwolf. The Night Patrol was cured, after which Russell was drawn into a conflict involving the Midnight Sons and was slain by Switchblade (the insane Darkhold-powered Blade), but Jack was revived once Louise Hastings broke Switchblade's spell. Russell befriended the again pseudo-vampiric (and now demon-possessed) Morbius, had a vision of advertisements on the moon causing mass insanity and fought the Lilin Goblins, Mr. Hyde and the sadist Morphine. Jack had an affair with Morbius' possessed former girlfriend Martine Bancroft.

Jack again began losing control of the Werewolf, locking himself in a cage while under the full moons, and even glimpsing visions of Hell as he transformed. From the Cult of the Third Moon's dying leader, Walter Clark, Russell learned that only the legendary Wolfblade could control his lupine self. With the aid of Smedley, a mysterious benefactor, Russell recovered all three parts of the Wolfblade, battled the original Wolf Demon in a branch of Hell, completed the puzzle by reaccepting both selves, and seemingly regained control. However, after Jack visited friends Freddie and the disfigured Lump, Smedley sent him to investigate a series of killings in which the evidence pointed to Jack as the killer. As Russell began to mutate further, Smedley said Jack just had not been careful enough in his wish to be freed from the Wolf Demon and that he must embrace the disease, or it would destroy him. Uncertain how to accomplish this, Jack found a confidant in the Lump, who cared for the Werewolf as he hid out in the sewers. While Jack's new girlfriend, Roxanna, remained blissfully unaware of his dual existence, the Werewolf was tracked down by a pair of detectives, escaping only after they were slain by the Cult of the Third Moon. Though Jack's subsequent fate is unknown, he was later seen sensing the arrival of the mystic assassin Hellphyr. In the Legion of Monsters: Werewolf by Night one-shot, Jack Russell came to Salvage, Alabama to save a family of law-abiding werewolves from a group of townsfolk led by Cal Escher. Young Rhonda was the only one left in the family after her mother and her sister Suzie chose death by gun or knife. The girl was drowning her sorrows in Sullivan's bar next to the cemetery when the gang attacked her, revealing her werewolf nature by means of a tarot card ("The Moon") and then trying to kill her. Russell interfered, mutating into the Werewolf while Rhonda decided to do the same. After killing the violent gang, Russell and Rhonda left the town, determined to control their afflictions and live their lives without fear. The Moon Knight rescues Jack from a criminal enterprise wherein samples of his blood are used to temporarily mutate homeless people into pseudo-werewolves, who are then provoked into fighting each other as a spectator sport. The Moon Knight frees Jack, who has degenerated into a near-mindless feral state, from his captors; the Werewolf proceeds to go on a rampage, attacking both his tormentors and the Moon Knight, who subdues him before restoring his freedom to him.

The Werewolf appears as part of the new Midnight Sons team to hunt down zombies who escaped A.R.M.O.R. headquarters and prevent the contagion from spreading. Prior to the team's mission, he records a video will and testament telling his sister that he is happy in life. He was given a vaccine developed by Morbius. In their search for the missing zombie Deadpool, the team battles and kills zombie Men-Fish and their leader, the Piranha. After battling the Hood's Night Shift and watching ally the Man-Thing seemingly die in a battle against Deadpool, Russell's vaccine fails him and he becomes a zombie. He then confronts Jennifer Kale. He battles Morbius, who realizes that Jack's werewolf form is not subject to the virus, and Kale summons a moonlight spell to mutate him into the Werewolf. Jack is later restored to normal by Morbius, who developed a cure for the zombie virus using Spider-Man's blood and samples of the zombie virus from different realities. After the death of Frank Castle, Morbius pieces the Punisher together again and enlists his help in saving monsters from extinction. Jack Russell, the Man-Thing and the Living Mummy are part of the Legion of Monsters, who fight those who would wipe out all monsters. The Punisher aids this group in protecting an underground city that has many innocent, sentient monsters. Russell appears among many mystical beings of lupine and feline nature drawn to the headquarters of X-Factor Investigations by the imminent birth of the mutant Wolfsbane's child. While many of the gathered beings wish to acquire the child for their own ends, Russell seems intent on protecting mother and child. Once the child is born, it is rejected by a shaken Wolfsbane due to its vicious, feral nature and her own religious beliefs. The cub appears to be caught up in a convergence of the mystic forces seeking it, vanishing explosively from the Earth; however, Russell finds the child hiding in a cave and takes it under his care. Deadpool later discovered that Russell had an affair with his wife Shiklah. Deadpool then promptly decapitates Jack with a blunderbuss, but Shiklah reveals that he will survive.

== Powers and abilities ==
Jack Russell is a descendant of the mystically altered offshoot of humans known as Lycanthropes. During the night of the full moon and the two nights surrounding it he is forced to mutate into a werewolf, a large, powerful form which is a hybrid of human and wolf, and loses his human intellect. He is also capable of transforming voluntarily outside of the full moon, at which time he remains in control of himself. As a werewolf, Jack gains the proportionate physical advantages of a wolf. In this form, he possesses superhuman strength, speed, stamina, durability, agility, reflexes, and acute senses. He possesses a superhuman sense of smell, which carries over to his human form. He has powerful teeth and claws that are able to rend light metals. The Werewolf is resistant to many forms of conventional injury and very difficult to kill by conventional means. Though he can be severely wounded, his accelerated healing factor allows him to recover from non-fatal wounds much faster than a human would. He is vulnerable to magical attacks and, like all werewolves, he can be killed by weapons made of silver, due to its inherent mystical "purity."

== Reception ==
=== Critical response ===
Martyn Warren of Screen Rant included Jack Russell in their "Top 10 Werewolves In Comics" list, while George Chrysostomou ranked him 5th in their "Marvel Comics: 10 Most Powerful Werewolves" list. Comic Book Resources ranked the Jack Russell 2nd in their "10 Best Members Of Marvel's Legion Of Monsters" list, 2nd in their "10 Strongest Moon Knight Villains" list, 6th in their "10 Best Wolf-Inspired Characters in Comics" list, 8th in their "Scariest Comic Book Werewolves" list, and 9th in their "10 Most Powerful Members of Marvel's Midnight Sons" list. Marc Buxton of Den of Geek ranked the Jack Russell incarnation of Werewolf 6th in their "Marvel's 31 Best Monsters" list, writing, "Who ever thought a werewolf named Jack Russell could be so awesome? Werewolf by Night was part of the Marvel monster surge of the early '70s and remains one of Marvel's most heroic classic monsters."

== Other versions ==
=== Infinity Wars ===
Norman Russell / Goblin by Night, a composite character based on Werewolf by Night and Norman Osborn / Green Goblin, appears in Infinity Wars.

=== Marvel Adventures ===
An alternate universe version of Jack Russell from Earth-20051 appears in Marvel Adventures.

=== Supernatural Tourbook and Supernaturals ===
An alternate version of Jack Russell appears in Supernatural Tourbook and Supernaturals.

== In other media ==
=== Television ===
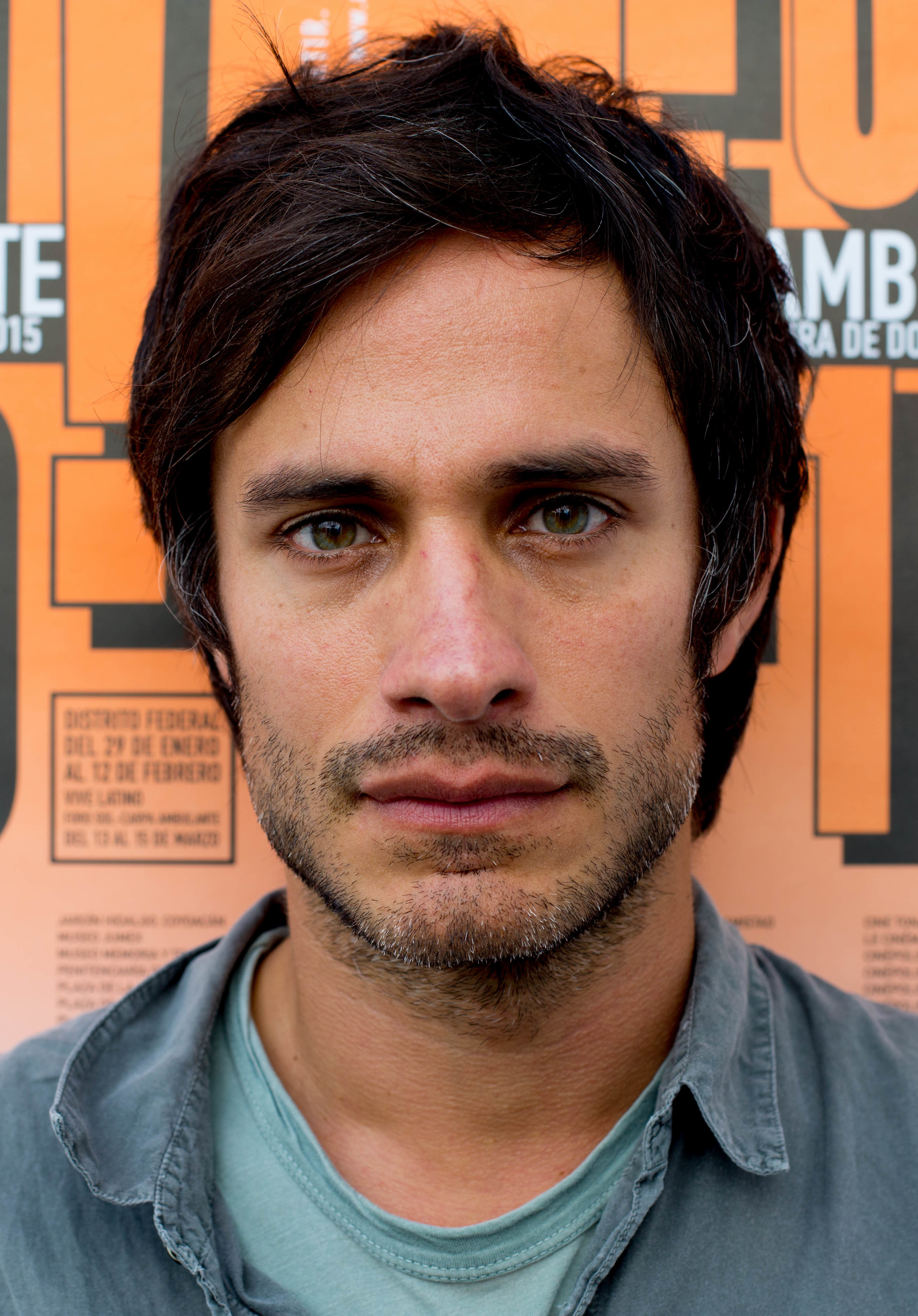
Jack Russel was portrayed by Gael García Bernal in the Marvel Cinematic Universe.

- Werewolf by Night appears in The Super Hero Squad Show episode "This Man-Thing, This Monster! (Six Against Infinity, Part 3)," voiced by Rob Paulsen. This version hails from an alternate reality populated primarily by monsters and is a founding member of the Supernatural Hero Squad.
- Jack Russell / Werewolf by Night appears in the Ultimate Spider-Man two-part episode "Blade and the Howling Commandos", voiced by Ross Lynch. This version is a member of the Howling Commandos.
- Werewolf by Night appears in Hulk and the Agents of S.M.A.S.H., voiced by Nolan North. This version is a member of the Howling Commandos.
  - Additionally, Jack's grandfather Gregor Russoff (also voiced by North) appears in the episode "Days of Future Smash, Part 3: Dracula".
- Jack Russell / Werewolf by Night appears in a self-titled Marvel Cinematic Universe (MCU) television special, portrayed by Gael García Bernal.

=== Film ===
An original incarnation of Werewolf by Night, Jake Lightman, was intended to appear in a film written by Robert Nelson Jacobs prior to its cancellation.

=== Video games ===
- Jack Russell / Werewolf by Night appears as a non-playable character in Marvel vs. Capcom 3: Fate of Two Worlds and Ultimate Marvel vs. Capcom 3.
- Jack Russell / Werewolf by Night appears as an unlockable playable character in Marvel Super Hero Squad Online.
- Jack Russell / Werewolf by Night appears as an unlockable playable character in Marvel Avengers Academy, voiced by Alec Hadden.

== Collected editions ==
Title	Material collected	Published date	ISBN
Essential Werewolf by Night Vol. 1	Marvel Spotlight #2-4, Werewolf By Night (vol. 1) #1-21, Marvel Team-Up #12, Giant-Size Creatures #1, The Tomb of Dracula #18	October 2005	978-0785118398
Essential Werewolf by Night Vol. 2	Werewolf By Night (vol. 1) #22-43, Giant-Size Werewolf #2-5, Marvel Premiere #28	November 2007	978-0785127253
Marvel Masterworks: Werewolf by Night Vol. 1	Marvel Spotlight #2-4, Werewolf by Night (vol. 1) #1-8, Marvel Team-Up #12	September 2022	978-1302933463
Marvel Masterworks: Werewolf by Night Vol. 2	Werewolf by Night #9-21, The Tomb of Dracula #18, Giant-Size Creatures #01 and material from Monsters Unleashed #06-07	November 2023	978-1302949488
Marvel Masterworks: Werewolf by Night Vol. 3	Werewolf by Night #22-30, Giant-Size Werewolf #2-5	November 2024	978-13029-5550-2
Werewolf by Night: The Complete Collection Vol. 1	Marvel Spotlight #2-4, Werewolf by Night (vol. 1)#1-15, Marvel Team-Up #12, Tomb of Dracula #18	October 2017	978-1302908393
Werewolf by Night: The Complete Collection Vol. 2	Werewolf by Night #16-30, Giant-Size Creatures #1, Giant-Size Werewolf #2-4, material from Monsters Unleashed (vol. 1) #6-7	February 2018	978-1302909512
Werewolf by Night: The Complete Collection Vol. 3	Werewolf by Night #31-43, Giant-Size Werewolf #5, Marvel Premiere #28, Spider-Woman (vol. 1) #6, 19, 32, Marvel Team-Up #93, Ghost Rider (vol. 2) #55, Moon Knight (vol. 1) #29-30, material from Marvel Premiere #59	May 2018	978-1302911584
Werewolf by Night Omnibus	Marvel Spotlight #2-4, Werewolf by Night (vol. 1) #1-43, Marvel Team-Up #12, Tomb of Dracula #18, Giant-Size Creatures #1, Giant-Size Werewolf #2-5, Marvel Premiere #28	October 2015	978-0785199083
Werewolf by Night: In the Blood	Werewolf by Night (vol. 2) #1-4	August 2009	978-0785132806
Legion Of Monsters	Legion of Monsters: Werewolf by Night #1 and Legion of Monsters: Morbius #1, Legion of Monsters: Man-Thing #1, Legion of Monsters: Satana #1	November 2007	978-0785127543
Werewolf by Night: New Wolf Rising	Werewolf By Night (vol. 3) #1-4	December 2020	978-1302924744
