= Mockingbird (Marvel Comics) =

Marvel Comics fictional character

- Bobbi Morse taken from the variant cover of Mockingbird #1 by Kirbi Fagan (March 2016).

Publication information
- Publisher: Marvel Comics
- First appearance: As Dr. Barbara Morse: Astonishing Tales #6 (June 1971); Full appearance: Astonishing Tales #12 (June 1972); As Agent 19 of S.H.I.E.L.D.: Astonishing Tales #18 (June 1973); As Huntress: Marvel Super Action #1 (January 1976); As Mockingbird: Marvel Team-Up #95 (July 1980)
- Created by: Len Wein (writer); Neal Adams (artist)

In-story information
- Full name: Barbara "Bobbi" Morse
- Species: Human mutate
- Team affiliations: S.H.I.E.L.D.; Avengers; West Coast Avengers; Great Lakes Avengers; Night Shift; Legion of the Unliving; New Avengers; World Counter-terrorism Agency; Secret Avengers; Parker Industries; Force Works; G.I.R.L; Advanced Idea Mechanics (A.I.M); Underground; Daughters of Liberty; Agents of Wakanda
- Partnerships: Kevin Plunder/Ka-Zar; Clint Barton/Hawkeye (ex-husband); Peter Parker/Spider-Man
- Notable aliases: Barbara Morse-Barton; Roberta Morse; Agent 19; The Huntress; Mockingbird
- Abilities: Superhuman strength and agility; Accelerated healing factor; Halted aging; Expert markswoman and master of various other weapons, especially two trademark battle staves; Proficient in armed hand to hand combat, espionage, gymnastics and martial arts

Mockingbird is a superhero appearing in American comic books published by Marvel Comics. Created by Len Wein and Neal Adams, Barbara "Bobbi" Morse first appeared in Astonishing Tales #6 in 1971 as a supporting character and eventual love interest of Ka-Zar, with a Ph.D. in biology. She is soon revealed to be the highly trained Agent 19 of S.H.I.E.L.D., taking the moniker Huntress in Marvel Super Action #1 in 1976, and Mockingbird in Marvel Team-Up #95 in 1980, before going on to be a member of several Avengers teams, briefly marrying and subsequently divorcing Clint Barton/Hawkeye.

Mockingbird has been described as one of Marvel's most notable female heroes.

In media set in the Marvel Cinematic Universe (MCU), Bobbi Morse and Agent 19 are depicted as separate characters, the former appearing in the second and third seasons of the television series Agents of S.H.I.E.L.D. (2014–2016), portrayed by Adrianne Palicki, and the latter (as retired S.H.I.E.L.D. agent Laura Barton) appearing in the films Avengers: Age of Ultron (2015) and Avengers: Endgame (2019) and the Disney+ miniseries Hawkeye (2021), portrayed by Linda Cardellini.

== Publication history ==
=== Creation ===
Barbara "Bobbi" Morse first appeared in the Ka-Zar feature of Astonishing Tales. In issue #6 (June 1971), by Gerry Conway and Barry Windsor-Smith, an unnamed brunette woman came to Ka-Zar's English estate looking for him. Issue #8 (October 1971) introduced a blonde woman named Barbara, the fiancée of the pilot Paul Allen, and identified her as the brunette from the earlier issues. Herb Trimpe, who drew #7 and #8, said the change in hair color was probably the colorist's mistake, made while the team was rushing to meet deadlines. Conway suggested that Roy Thomas, who wrote #7, might have been involved in plotting these issues.

Thomas recalled wanting to work a second Man-Thing story into Ka-Zar. Len Wein and Neal Adams had made that story for Savage Tales #2, but the magazine was temporarily cancelled before it appeared. It starred Dr. Barbara Morse, a scientist trying to recreate the Super-Soldier serum, and was eventually published in Astonishing Tales #12 (June 1972). In 1976, editor Archie Goodwin proposed a new character called the Huntress for the black and white magazine Marvel Super Action and suggested building her around S.H.I.E.L.D. Goodwin wrote in the issue's editorial that writer Mike Friedrich took a character he had helped develop on Ka-Zar and revamped her completely. Only one issue of the magazine was published, and the Huntress did not return. Friedrich later said he remembered almost nothing about the story.

The Mockingbird identity debuted in Marvel Team-Up #95 (July 1980). In an editorial box on the letters page, Mark Gruenwald wrote that he had first created Mockingbird as an opponent for Spider-Woman, and that Steven Grant, then writing Marvel Team-Up, helped him work out her powers and weapons. Gruenwald left Spider-Woman without using her. Grant was looking for something new to do and wanted to revamp Bobbi Morse, and the two combined the concepts. What interested him was a story about someone investigating S.H.I.E.L.D., which he had pitched to Marvel in late 1976 and again, with Nick Fury as the investigator, after he began writing for the company. Marvel was not interested, and the Team-Up issue gave him a way to use the idea anyway. He had read the Ka-Zar issues she appeared in and her one Huntress story, and said he had no real interest in the character, but that the S.H.I.E.L.D. angle gave him something to work with.

According to Grant, the name came from Gruenwald, a fan of DC Comics' superheroes who kept notebooks of names and designs for a Marvel Universe version of the Justice League. Grant was given the notebooks to look for a new identity for Bobbi, since the Huntress name was no longer usable after DC introduced a new Huntress. One entry was a Marvel version of Black Canary named Mockingbird, whom Gruenwald meant to pair with Hawkeye, Marvel's counterpart to Green Arrow. Grant said he was not fond of the name, but it was better than anything he had come up with. The Official Handbook of the Marvel Universe #7 (July 1983) later stated that she took the name from a C.I.A. operation involving Fury. Handbook co-writer Peter Sanderson said he knew of no story featuring the operation, and that Gruenwald, who regarded Mockingbird as his character, was willing to establish details in the Handbook that had not appeared in print.

Asked whether the character began as a Black Canary imitation, Grant answered "Unquestionably yes", at least in Gruenwald's notebooks. He credited Gruenwald with the costume that appeared in print and said he designed her weapons himself, "sort of". Gruenwald's version carried one long stave, which Grant thought too cumbersome. He came up with a stave that split into parts and could be used in several ways, giving her an offensive and defensive tool comparable to Captain America's shield, and he tried to remove as many Black Canary elements as he could. Grant said he never intended her to become involved with Hawkeye; Gruenwald did, and kept the plan to himself. Gruenwald's assistant editor Mike Carlin later described Mockingbird as created a Black Canary type who was paired with Hawkeye afterward, as DC had done with its couple, and writer Steve Englehart described the pairing in similar terms. Grant had hoped the Team-Up issue would lead to a solo story, but he described the response as silence, and said Marvel was not then interested in masked heroes without powers.

=== Post-creation ===
In subsequent publications, creators including Roy Thomas, Len Wein, Neal Adams, Mike Friedrich, Archie Goodwin, George Evans, Steven Grant, and Mark Gruenwald made significant contributions to the development of the character.

After appearing in the 1983 Hawkeye mini-series, Mockingbird became a founding member of the West Coast Avengers, appearing in the group's initial self-titled mini-series, followed by regular appearances in the group's ongoing monthly series, until its end in 1994.

Mockingbird appeared as a regular character throughout the 2010–2013 New Avengers series, from issue #1 (August 2010) through its final issue #34 (January 2013). She also co-starred in the 2010 series Hawkeye & Mockingbird, which ran for 6 issues. Mockingbird became a regular character in the 2013 Secret Avengers series by Nick Spencer and Luke Ross.

In September 2015, Mockingbird starred in the one-shot Mockingbird: S.H.I.E.L.D. 50th Anniversary #1 by writer Chelsea Cain and artist Joëlle Jones. That November, Marvel announced the launch of her first ongoing series by Cain and artist Kate Niemczyk in March 2016. It was canceled after eight issues due to poor sales, despite receiving critical acclaim.

== Fictional character biography ==
=== First appearances ===
The character who later becomes Mockingbird first appears in a short sequence in Astonishing Tales #6 (June 1971) in which a frantic young brunette arrives at the English country estate of Lord Kevin Plunder (who is also known as "Ka-Zar"). Encountering the butler, she exclaims, "Lord Kevin Plunder where is he? I must speak with him! 'tis a matter—of the fate of worlds!" In a brief second appearance in the same issue, the character claims that "Lord Kevin Plunder and I have never met—and yet I feel that I know him...You see, I can—can 'feel' people in my mind! And I know that unless I speak with him—Lord Kevin will die!" Subsequent creators continued to develop the character, and no later story makes reference to any psychic abilities.

After this story, Roy Thomas took over writing the Ka-Zar strip and in his first story the as-yet-unnamed character makes another brief appearance. The butler at Ka-Zar's estate informs her that his employer is currently in the Savage Land. The girl then vows to "walk the Savage Land" for "[Ka-Zar's] sake and the sake of the world".

In Astonishing Tales #8 (Oct. 1971), Thomas is joined by co-writer Gary Friedrich and the character begins to develop—her hair color changes to blonde without explanation and her name is given as "Barbara". In this issue, Ka-Zar comes upon the site of a plane crash in the Savage Land and encounters a survivor. This man explains that he and his fiancée Barbara flew to the Savage Land seeking Ka-Zar. He mentions that Barbara learned of Ka-Zar's whereabouts from the butler at the Plunder Estate, clearly indicating that Barbara is meant to be the same character as the brunette from the previous two issues. Barbara is shown later in the story; having parachuted from the plane before the crash, she is rescued by a group of World War II veterans who have been trapped in the Savage Land for decades.

Gerry Conway briefly returned to co-write (with Roy Thomas) Barbara's next appearance where she finally meets Ka-Zar and is reunited with her fiancé (whose name is revealed as "Paul"). In the following issue (written by Thomas alone), Ka-Zar leads the two characters through the dangerous Savage Land.

Astonishing Tales #12 (June 1972) is a key early appearance for the character, due in part to Marvel's decision to feature Man-Thing in this issue. At this point, Man-Thing had made only one previous appearance, in the 1971 black-and-white magazine Savage Tales #1. A follow-up seven-page Man-Thing story by writer Len Wein and artist Neal Adams was commissioned for a version of Savage Tales #2 that was ultimately never published. Finally seeing print in Astonishing Tales #12, the sequence is presented as a flashback and an interlude between the main action of the book.

One of the characters in the Wein/Adams story is a blonde female scientist called "Dr. Barbara Morse". Morse is working on a research project in the Florida Everglades called Project: Gladiator, which is an attempt to replicate the Super-Soldier serum which was used to create Captain America. This is the same research which Ted Sallis had previously been working on when a flawed serum transformed him into the Man-Thing. In the story, Morse is abducted by AIM thugs and is later liberated through the intervention of the Man-Thing.

Framing the flashback is a sequence of newer material by writer Roy Thomas and artist John Buscema in which Barbara (now revealed to be "Dr. Barbara Morse" and thus the character from the Wein/Adams Man-Thing story) and Paul (now "Dr. Paul Allen") accompany Ka-Zar back to the United States and explain that they sought him out so that he could help them deal with the problems surrounding the appearance of the Man-Thing in Florida.

In the next issue, the storyline is wrapped up and Paul reveals he is a double agent working for A.I.M. It is also revealed for the first time that Barbara has connections with S.H.I.E.L.D.; the spy agency asked her to pretend to love Allen to "learn what [she] could" about his activities with AIM. At the story's end Paul dies at the hands of the Man-Thing and Barbara expresses the hope that she can "go back to just being a scientist again".

=== Bobbi Morse, Agent 19 of S.H.I.E.L.D. ===
Mike Friedrich took over from Roy Thomas to become writer of Astonishing Tales with #15 (Dec. 1972). He introduces a new status-quo in which Ka-Zar is living in New York and "lady biologist" and S.H.I.E.L.D. agent Barbara (who now prefers to be called "Bobbi") Morse is his constant companion.

Friedrich remained the writer of the various color Ka-Zar series for the next two years and for most of that period he continued to feature Morse as Ka-Zar's sidekick and occasional love interest. In these stories she is depicted as a fully trained S.H.I.E.L.D. agent. Contemptuous of his jungle origins, she is Ka-Zar's escort to the city and modern life. Together she and Ka-Zar tackle threats such as the Pusher, Gemini, Victorius, Gog, and the Plunderer. As the series progresses, she begins to wear a regular costume of tinted-glasses, a red one-piece, and boots. Her S.H.I.E.L.D. designation of "Agent 19" is revealed and she and Ka-Zar finally kiss.

In 1974, the color Ka-Zar series left Astonishing Tales and was relaunched in the Ka-Zar, Lord of the Hidden Jungle title. The strip is set once again in the Savage Land and Morse is absent for the first story. She returns in the third issue—explaining that Nick Fury had sent her on a S.H.I.E.L.D. assignment to look into "El Tigre", a subversive who is exploiting the energy crisis in South America. This leads her to reluctantly travel back to the Savage Land, where she and Ka-Zar defeat El Tigre and his ally Man-God together.

The introduction of Shanna the She-Devil into Ka-Zar's supporting cast changes Morse's role in the stories of this period. Ka-Zar expresses clear attraction to the more jungle-friendly Shanna from the outset and Morse is cast as the secondary love interest. This dynamic is most notable in Morse's lone appearance in the Ka-Zar strip in the black-and-white magazine Savage Tales (#8; Jan. 1975). Written by Gerry Conway, the story depicts Morse leading Shanna and a group of S.H.I.E.L.D. agents into the Savage Land where they work with Ka-Zar to neutralise a threat to world security. During the course of the adventure, Morse realises that Ka-Zar's affections lie with Shanna. This story, first published in late-1974, is the last in which Morse appears as a Ka-Zar supporting character.

=== Huntress to Mockingbird ===
A year later, Mike Friedrich returned to the character in a 20-page story with art by George Evans. Published in the one-shot black-and-white magazine Marvel Super Action #1 (Jan. 1976), the story is the first in which Morse appears as a costumed super heroine and lead protagonist. While operating as a S.H.I.E.L.D. agent, she is recruited by a United States Senator to look into corruption in a Latin American branch of the espionage organization. To complete her mission, she "drops out" of S.H.I.E.L.D. and takes on the superhero identity of the "Huntress".

In a text piece in Marvel Super Action #1, editor Archie Goodwin explained how Morse came to be used for this story

I suggested the title ["Huntress"] and the notion of using S.H.I.E.L.D. to writer Mike Friedrich. He decided to draw upon a character he'd helped develop while scripting the color Ka-Zar comic, and wound up revamping her totally. With a bit of kibitzing from Mike and myself, artist George Evans designed the lady's costume and we were in business.

Marvel Super Action was designed as a bi-monthly publication, but the economic recession of the mid-1970s forced Marvel to scale back their plans and the magazine was published as a one-off. This meant that the plot of Huntress, intended as a two-parter, had to be condensed before publication and no follow-up stories by the same creators were ever produced.

Morse's next published appearance was Marvel Team-Up #95 (July, 1980) in which she dons a new costume and finally takes on the alias "Mockingbird". This story explains that she has continued to look into corruption in S.H.I.E.L.D. and in doing so has come to be hunted by the organization which mistakes her for a criminal. Teaming up with Spider-Man (and with assistance from S.H.I.E.L.D. director Nick Fury), Mockingbird confronts Carl Delanden, a corrupt S.H.I.E.L.D. branch director. In the ensuing battle, she is shot by S.H.I.E.L.D. agents who were ordered to subdue her at any cost. The story ends with an unconscious, badly injured but exonerated Mockingbird left in the care of Nick Fury.

In the letters column of that issue, the series' then assistant editor Mark Gruenwald explained the creative origins of this new iteration of Bobbi Morse:

'Where did this Mockingbird come from?' some of you may be asking. After all it isn't every day that a new super heroine is premiered in Marvel Team-Up. Well the story behind her creation is this: when I had been writing the Spider-Woman book one of my chief objectives was to build up a rogue's gallery that S-W could call her own. One of several characters I conceived and designed was Mockingbird. Showing the sketch to Steven Grant, writer about town, he helped me work out her powers and weaponry. Well I never got round to doing a Mockingbird story before I left Spider-Woman, so I put the idea on the back burner. Time passed, and Steven was searching for something new and different to do in Team-Up. He was toying with the idea some of us have had to revamp the Bobbi Morse character (of Ka-Zar and Super-Action fame). Somehow we got the notion to amalgamate the two concepts and make Bobbi Morse the Mockingbird (Anyone venture a guess why we abandoned the "Huntress" moniker?) All that was necessary was to change her hair and skin color since the original M.B. was going to be black. So that's the story behind the story.

The reference to the "why we abandoned the "'Huntress' moniker" is a nod to the fact that Marvel's rival DC Comics had debuted a character with the same name in the interim between Marvel Super Action #1 and Marvel Team-Up #95. DC's "Huntress, the superhero daughter of the Batman and Catwoman of Earth-Two, debuted in All Star Comics #69 and DC Super-Stars #17 (both Dec. 1977).

=== Mockingbird and Hawkeye ===
Mockingbird encounters Hawkeye. Art by Mark Gruenwald.

The character next appeared in Gruenwald's 1983 four-issue Hawkeye miniseries. Fully recovered from her injuries, Mockingbird investigates corruption at Cross Technological Enterprises, where Clint Barton/Hawkeye works as security chief. Though the two initially come into conflict with each other, they end up co-operating to fight the villain Crossfire and by the series end they are shown to be seriously romantically involved, having eloped together to the Pocono Mountains and apparently married.

The miniseries reveals how Morse became involved with S.H.I.E.L.D. recounting how she left her biology studies at Georgia Tech to follow her "favorite prof" Wilma Calvin on the government's Project: Gladiator. The research project was partly sponsored by S.H.I.E.L.D. which led Morse to enroll in their spy school and graduate at the top of her class. It is also revealed that she spent six months convalescing in a private hospital after the injuries she suffered in Marvel Team-Up #95.

Gruenwald was editor of the Avengers title in late 1983 when writer Roger Stern began to feature Hawkeye and Mockingbird as members of the series' supporting cast. In a short period Mockingbird moves back into Avengers Mansion with Barton as he returns to active duty, she is formally introduced to the team as his wife, the Vision then proposes that Hawkeye and Mockingbird establish a second Avengers team on the West Coast of the United States, and the two move out to Los Angeles.

=== West Coast Avengers ===
This leads into the 1984 four-issue West Coast Avengers limited series, also written by Stern and edited by Gruenwald. In this series, Mockingbird becomes a full-fledged Avenger as she assists her husband in setting up a new branch of the organization.

West Coast Avengers became a regular series in 1985 and Steve Englehart, the series writer for its first 42 issues, featured Mockingbird heavily as one of the main cast members of the book. A year into the series, Mockingbird begins to wear a modified version of her original costume, designed by series artist Al Milgrom.

Over the latter course of his run, Englehart developed a storyline in which the relationship between Hawkeye and Mockingbird is put under serious strain. When the West Coast Avengers are transported to the Old West of 1876, the Phantom Rider (Lincoln Slade) abducts, drugs, and brainwashes Mockingbird into forgetting her original life and convinces her she is in love with Slade (and by implication, raping her). After breaking free of his control, Mockingbird seeks revenge on the Rider, and is shown allowing him to plunge to his death off of a cliff.

Hawkeye learns Mockingbird let the Phantom Rider die and harshly disapproves of her actions which leads Mockingbird to leave both Hawkeye and the Avengers. For a time, she and ex-Avengers Tigra and Moon Knight operate as a small fighting unit and have various adventures including a battle with the High Evolutionary and an encounter with the modern-day Phantom Rider who is possessed by his 19th century ancestor. In one story, Mockingbird's arrest of the Digger causes a rift between the West Coast Avengers and the Night Shift. Mockingbird later reconciles with the no-longer-possessed Phantom Rider.

John Byrne became writer and artist of West Coast Avengers in 1989 and in his first story Mockingbird returns and admits to inadvertently betraying the team. She later explains that she was duped by a group who claimed to be connected to S.H.I.E.L.D. into revealing security information about their headquarters for a "contingency" plan to neutralise the Vision in the event he should try to take over the world once again. In fact, the plan is put into operation immediately and, when Mockingbird realizes this, she rushes to the West Coast Avenger's headquarters only to arrive too late, the group having already abducted and dismantled the android. The group is revealed to be a consortium of international security services and though the Vision is eventually restored his memory and personality are erased.

Later, Mockingbird tracks down Clint Barton (Hawkeye) and makes an attempt at reconciliation, admitting she still loves him. During their discussion, Barton reveals they had previously decided to divorce. Hawkeye and Mockingbird then travel to Milwaukee to look into the appearance of a group calling themselves the "Great Lakes Avengers". Upon investigation, the couple decides to stay in Milwaukee to train the amateur superhero group and work on their relationship.

Mockingbird's next regular appearances are as a supporting character in the Hawkeye strip in Avengers Spotlight, in a storyline written by Steve Gerber in which she aids her husband as he takes on the Los Angeles Asian crime lord Lotus.

=== Avengers West Coast ===
Roy Thomas returned to writing the character when he and his wife Dann Thomas became co-writers of the rechristened Avengers West Coast title in 1990. Mockingbird first makes a brief reappearance in the title when she attends an Avengers West Coast team meeting and stands for election to return to the team, being voted in as an "alternate member" (effectively a reserve member). Hawkeye (who is already a full member, having returned to the series a year earlier) admits he did not vote for her and describes her as his "estranged wife". Mockingbird then returns to Detroit.

In a later storyline, Morse contacts Barton and states that she is returning to Los Angeles from Detroit to discuss matters with him. She is then reunited with her husband while he is in the field as Hawkeye, joining him and the Avengers West Coast on a mission after which Mockingbird begins to once again make regular appearances as a cast member of the book. Mockingbird later reveals to Hawkeye that their divorce is almost final and Ultron abducts her and uses her thought patterns and personality to create his second robotic 'wife' Alkhema, the two rekindling their romance after she is liberated.

The intended interpretation of some of these events is changed by a story that is published 17 years later. New Avengers: The Reunion #2 (May 2009) asserts that just prior to her abduction by Ultron, Mockingbird was replaced by the Skrull impersonator H'rpra, and thus the "Mockingbird" who appears between Avengers West Coast vol. 1, #89/90 (Dec. 1992/Jan. 1993) and Secret Invasion #8 (Jan. 2009) should no longer be considered the genuine article.

The reconciliation between Hawkeye and Mockingbird is short-lived as in late 1993 Thomas has the character sacrifice her life to save her husband from Mephisto in the centennial issue of Avengers West Coast.

The Avengers West Coast title was canceled two issues later. The storyline depicted how the team, reeling from the events surrounding Mockingbird's death, is ultimately forced to disband.

=== Post-death ===
In 1998, writer Kurt Busiek briefly revived the character in the Avengers volume 3 series as a member of the Legion of the Unliving, part of the Grim Reaper's plot to destroy the Avengers.

In 1999's Thunderbolts Annual 2000, writers Busiek and Fabian Nicieza have Mockingbird send a message from the afterlife that results in the resurrection of Hellcat. Her reasons for being in Hell are unclear, though she denies it is due to her previous refusal to save the Phantom Rider, hinting that her presence in Hell is serving some purpose. In the subsequent Hellcat limited series by writer Steve Englehart, Mockingbird is depicted fighting endless battles in Hell.

The character next appears in the tongue-in-cheek 2006 X-Statix Presents: Dead Girl miniseries by writer Peter Milligan. In this series she is depicted as residing in Heaven, where she is an active member of a book club that also includes Dead Girl, Gwen Stacy, and Moira MacTaggert. She is recruited by Doctor Strange and Dead Girl to help defeat Mr. Pitiful and his group of resurrected supervillains. She returns to Heaven at the series conclusion and no reference is made to her previous appearances in Hell.

=== Return ===
In a 2009 interview Marvel editor and writer Jim McCann revealed how the decision to resurrect Mockingbird was made creatively:

About a year-and-a-half ago, we were planning the ending for "Secret Invasion" and with one character we wanted to get back something that the Skrulls would have taken away. There were a couple of characters on the list for that, but Mockingbird was the one I fought for the most, and as [Secret Invasion series writer] Brian [Bendis] has pointed out, I said that they were like the Mr. & Mrs. Smith of the Marvel Universe. He was like, "That sounds great. We can use that".

Bendis first teases at Mockingbird's return when, at the beginning of "Secret Invasion", a spaceship crash-lands in the Savage Land and a large group of superheroes emerges from the wreckage, among whom is a character who looks exactly like Mockingbird. All the members of this group present themselves as the genuine article—they claim that at some point in the past they were each abducted and replaced by Skrull imposters, the Skrulls being a race of alien shape-shifters. Clint Barton, who is present at the scene (and at this point goes by the code name "Ronin") believes this "Mockingbird"'s claims to be his wife because she is able to tell him the significance of the date "October 12" to their relationship. The date would have been the birthday of the couple's (previously unmentioned) miscarried child, which—it is explained—was conceived at some point during their joint career as Avengers. Barton initially defends this "Mockingbird" from the suspicions of other superheroes, but when she is revealed to be a Skrull imposter he kills her in a fit of rage.

Later in the series, Iron Man finds a Skrull ship in orbit which genuinely contains various individuals who had been abducted and replaced by the Skrulls. The real Mockingbird is revealed to be among them and she tearfully reunites with Barton.

In a subsequent issue of Avengers: The Initiative writers Christos Gage and Dan Slott include Mockingbird among a group of Skrull abductees who attend a support meeting about their experience.

=== Back in action ===
After the character's return in the 2008 "Secret Invasion" storyline, Bendis began to use Mockingbird regularly in the New Avengers title. She joins the team (in which her husband, still using the code-name "Ronin", is also a member), and with them she fights the Hood's gang of super-villains, learns Spider-Man's true identity, and battles Dormammu.

Mockingbird gains a new costume in 2009's New Avengers: The Reunion miniseries, which was pencilled by David Lopez and Jo Chen and written by the editor and writer who had previously advocated for Morse's return: Jim McCann. The plot of the series involves Mockingbird and Clint Barton/Ronin teaming-up to take on A.I.M. Scientist Supreme Monica Rappaccini. During the story Morse reveals that she and a group of fellow former S.H.I.E.L.D. agents who were also Skrull abductees have formed a new espionage organization—the "World Counter-terrorism Agency" or "W.C.A." (the abbreviation being a nod to Barton and Morse's former "West Coast Avengers" team).

This series also reveals that Mockingbird was replaced by a Skrull prior to her abduction by Ultron. This is a plot-point in the series as it establishes that prior to her abduction Barton and Morse were in the process of being divorced and so she is technically no longer married to him. By the story's conclusion they rekindle their relationship, though they decide to remain unmarried.

In March 2010 Marvel announced that a new Hawkeye & Mockingbird ongoing series would be launched in June 2010, produced by the New Avengers: The Reunion creative team of writer Jim McCann and artist David Lopez. Promotional interviews revealed that the premise of the series involved Morse and Clint Barton (once again under the code-name "Hawkeye") working together as agents of the World Counter-terrorism Agency. They are both also still members of the New Avengers, although Barton soon leaves the team because he prefers to work on the main Avengers team, saying that he was only with the New Avengers to spend time with his wife.

During a raid on a warehouse that is revealed to be the location of H.A.M.M.E.R.'s attempt to reorganize after the defeat of Norman Osborn, Mockingbird is mortally injured in a shooting despite Spider-Man's attempts to save her, forcing her teammates to evacuate her to the hospital. While Mockingbird lies in hospital in critical condition, Nick Fury contacts the team and gives her a top secret serum that was created by the Germans in 1959 and has recently been rediscovered by H.A.M.M.E.R. agents; a combination of the Super Soldier Serum that turned Steve Rogers into Captain America, and the Infinity Formula that slowed Fury's aging. The Formula saves Mockingbird's life, but Nick warns the New Avengers that he cannot predict the Formula's effects on her.

After being injected with the Formula, Mockingbird recovers, exhibiting powers similar to Steve Rogers. She is quite relieved and happy to be alive, and fights the Serpent's forces in New York with vigor. After she witnesses Avengers Tower fall, her feelings of happiness are sobered, and she vows to defeat Sin.

Hawkeye and Mockingbird remain divorced, going their separate paths.

=== Marvel NOW! ===
As part of the 2012 Marvel NOW! branding, Mockingbird appears as part of S.H.I.E.L.D.'s new Secret Avengers roster, making her debut appearance while helping Nick Fury, Jr. capture Taskmaster. During that mission, she uses S.H.I.E.L.D.'s Camo-Tech to disguise herself as Aloysius Thorndrake of the Shadow Council. Mockingbird goes to A.I.M. Island to assist Taskmaster in helping make contact between the rogue Iron Patriot drones and James Rhodes.

=== All-New, All-Different Marvel ===
As part of the All-New, All-Different Marvel branding, Mockingbird helps Spider-Man when they pursue Zodiac's Leo Sect down the highways of Shanghai, China as they give a status report to Nick Fury, Jr. When they catch the lead Leo Sect member, Mockingbird accuses him of adhering to his "no-one dies around me" idealism after using an antidote to counter the lead Leo Sect member's suicide pill. Spider-Man tells her he is not so naive anymore and simply wants to save everyone he can.

After recovering the Webware, Spider-Man gives the status of the mission to Mockingbird and Nick Fury Jr. Mockingbird tells Spider-Man that Leo is still being interrogated and has not snitched yet. During their collaboration, Mockingbird had a brief relationship with Spider-Man.

In the storyline "Civil War II," Mockingbird is invited to a cosplay cruise with the promise of secret documents to prove Hawkeye's innocence. It turns out to be a ruse by the Phantom Rider to win back her love. She is able to remove him from his corporeal form, but both fall into the water as the cruise rounds the Bermuda Triangle. Bobbi is rescued by Lance Hunter, but the Phantom is destroyed by the waters.

In the storyline "Iron Man 2020", Mockingbird appears as a member of Force Works. Their mission takes them to the island of Lingares, where they deal with Ultimo and a group of Deathloks.

== Powers, abilities, and equipment ==
Bobbi Morse is a trained S.H.I.E.L.D. agent who graduated at the top of her class and as such she is very proficient in several forms of hand-to-hand combat, including Kung Fu and Taekwondo and familiar with a wide range of weapons. The character usually uses a pair of batons which can be combined to form a single bō-staff in combat, weapons with which she has great expertise. Morse also used a pair of night vision and vision enhancing goggles, similarly to her once-husband Hawkeye. She also possesses a Ph.D. in biology. During one comic book series, Spider-Man provided her with a new uniform courtesy of Parker Industries for being their S.H.I.E.L.D. liaison. This costume came attached with wing-like extensions allowing Morse to glide on wind currents.

To cope with a mortal injury she sustained in a mission, Mockingbird was injected with an experimental serum combining the Super Soldier Serum that gave Captain America his strength and the Infinity Formula that has slowed Nick Fury's aging. Her injuries were healed, but Fury admitted his uncertainty about the formula's long-term consequences on her biology. Thus far, she has exhibited greatly enhanced physical strength, healing and agility.

== Reception ==
=== Critical reception ===
Matthew Erao of Screen Rant referred to Mockingbird as one of the "most powerful agents of S.H.I.E.L.D.," writing, "There have been a lot of formidable Agents of S.H.I.E.L.D. in the organization's long comic history. While many know Bobbi Morse as the superhero Mockingbird or S.H.I.E.L.D. Agent 19, she's also Dr. Barbara Morse, a genius in biology. Her Ph.D. in the field led to her working on Project: Gladiator in the Everglades, the same Super Soldier program that led to Ted Sallis becoming Man-Thing. Aside from her expert knowledge, she's also one of the most skilled S.H.I.E.L.D. agents there is. Introduced in Astonishing Tales #6 in 1971, Bobbi was almost a throwaway character before being crafted over the course of several comics into the genius badass we all know and love." David Harth of CBR.com called Mockingbird one of the "greatest avengers," asserting, "The Avengers boast a vast array of mighty heroes. The greatest among them rely on their inner strength, standing courageous in the face of danger. Mockingbird made a name for herself at S.H.I.E.L.D. Injected with a variant on the super soldier serum, Agent Bobbi Morse became Mockingbird and joined up with the Avengers, eventually marrying Hawkeye and helping found the West Coast Avengers. She was the heart and soul of the team, never shying away from the frontline. Mockingbird had some enhancements, including rapid healing, but she was only human. That never stopped her from throwing herself into battles that would've killed her a thousand times over. She survived every obstacle, including years in a Skrull prison, her courage getting her through it all."

=== Literary reception ===
==== Hawkeye & Mockingbird – 2010 ====
According to Diamond Comic Distributors, Hawkeye & Mockingbird #1 was the 73rd best selling comic book in June 2010.

James Hunt of CBR.com compared Hawkeye & Mockingbird #1 to Mr. And Mrs. Smith, saying, "New Avengers: The Reunion, which this series spins out of, was one of the highlights of last year, with smart, action-packed writing from Jim McCann casting Hawkeye and Mockingbird as pair as superhero spies/spouses reminiscent of Brad Pitt and Angelina Jolie in Mr. And Mrs. Smith. And to my delight, the opening scene of this issue kicks off in exactly that vein. Too often, miniseries granted a full return miss what made the original great, but McCann has nailed it here, quickly reintroducing the setup and setting about expanding the world of the two heroes. [...] For his part, David Lopez' art is fantastic: bright, clear storytelling, fluid and natural-looking figure work, and a brilliant aptitude for the sort of action sequence McCann is writing. The world is detailed and realistic, while Clint and Bobbi are both confident and sexy without being gratuitously drawn. For its part in the Big Avengers reshuffle, everything about the issue screams "Heroic Age". It feels like a new beginning, and it keeps up the high standard already set by "Avengers" and "Secret Avengers". The characters might not be the obvious choice of series lead, but McCann has written a book that seems original without being unfamiliar, and feel traditional while retaining a modern edge. Literally the only thing that upsets me about Hawkeye and Mockingbird is the feeling that it's far from being a sure thing. In many ways, this series has the potential to be the next "SWORD", the next "Captain Britain", the next "Power Girl"—a smart, funny, fresh take on superheroics that winds up ending before its time. This series deserves a long and entertaining run. Let's get the word out." Bryan Joel of IGN gave Hawkeye & Mockingbird #1 a grade of 7.7 out of 10, stating, "It's also interesting that Hawkeye gets first billing in the title, as even though he's the focal point for the issue and provides the narration, for all intents and purposes this is Mockingbird's book. For one, Clint already has regular billing in Avengers; as of this moment, this is the only place readers can catch Mockingbird's adventures. But more importantly, she's a more interesting character since her return. McCann writes Bobbi with a hardened edge and as a bit of an action junkie. She's only ever shown happy when she's throwing baddies from moving vehicles or watching them get impaled with Hawkeye's arrows. We're clearly dealing with a character who's not quite as balanced as she used to be, and a dredging-up of her sexual assault history with the Phantom Rider only serves to reinforce that. Finally, there's also a touch of irony to the title of Hawkeye & Mockingbird. While they've reconciled for the most part, the pair couldn't be on more different paths. Much of the issue is spent with Bobbi purposely ignoring Clint, or the couple furthering agendas that they're keeping hidden from each other. Readers coming into this series expecting hearts and flowers alongside their arrows and battle staves may be disappointed, but ultimately it makes for better reading. There's some definite friction between the two leads, friction which should develop into interesting stories as it moves forward. Is Hawkeye & Mockingbird #1 a groundbreaking work? No, but it fits well within "The Heroic Age" initiative, providing some old-fashioned superheroics and enough interpersonal drama to keep it engaging along the way. McCann lays the groundwork for what could turn out to be a very rewarding examination of two heroes struggling to make it work in the midst of the Marvel Universe's craziness."

==== Mockingbird: S.H.I.E.L.D. 50th Anniversary – 2015 ====
According to Diamond Comic Distributors, Mockingbird: S.H.I.E.L.D. 50th Anniversary #1 was the 80th best selling comic book in September 2015.

Doug Zawisza of CBR.com called Mockingbird: S.H.I.E.L.D. 50th Anniversary #1 a "gorgeous book that maintains a high standard from start to finish," asserting, "Jones' art is boldly colored by Rosenberg, who keeps the characters in realistic tones and shades but unleashes all sorts of crazy colors and patterns for the backgrounds. Caramagna adds in snappy sound effects (most notably in the morgue), using a different but clean font. He also balances the dialogue and captions throughout the story, keeping Jones' art clean. The story itself is constructed on a plot that exists solely to explain Bobbi Morse to newer readers. Cain does a great job of personalizing Mockingbird, but the story in this issue feels like a tryout. There's just enough here to sample but not quite enough to satisfy. I like what Cain does with the characters and the pacing is smart, but now I'd like to see a story with a slightly bigger scope, as Cain certainly makes Mockingbird worth reading. [...] "Mockingbird: S.H.I.E.L.D. 50th Anniversary" #1 is a decent read with a fun, fast-paced Mockingbird story and an intriguing but thin introduction to Red Widow. Both characters clearly have paths taking them elsewhere from this shared publication, but fans of Mockingbird will be pleased with this purchase. Where those paths wind up remains to be completely revealed, but—if the creative team in place for Bobbi Morse's tale joins her in the future—then I'll be checking in as well." Levi Hunt of IGN gave Mockingbird: S.H.I.E.L.D. 50th Anniversary #1 a grade of 9.3 out of 10, writing, "It's easy to compare this Mockingbird issue to the recent Matt Fraction Hawkeye series (she even mentions the ex herself on the very first page) and while it's true that this issue does share some stylistic similarities with that series, what sets Mockingbird apart is her confidence. The real-to-life situations, the reflexive humor, and the super spy fun are all present; but what makes Bobbi such an interesting and unique character here is her assuredness and swagger. It's so fun to watch people who are great at what they do, doing that. That credit goes not only to first-time comic book writer (and bestselling thriller author) Chelsea Cain, but also to Joelle Jones who reflects Bobbi's confidence perfectly in his clean, assured, and sprightly line work. Now, Marvel, please make this an ongoing series, because this was outstanding."

==== Mockingbird – 2016 ====
According to Diamond Comic Distributors, Mockingbird #1 was the 39th best selling comic book in March 2016. Mockingbird #1 was the 621st best selling comic book in 2016. In October 2016, the Mockingbird series topped Amazon's Best Sellers in Superhero Comics & Graphic Novels.

Greg McElhatton of CBR.com called Mockingbird #1 an "utter blast," asserting, "Niemczyk's art is a winner. If I had to compare her to another artist, it would be Frank Cho by virtue of her strong but graceful ink lines and the beautiful, smooth features she gives her characters. Niemczyk's art is more naturally proportioned, though, and includes a wider variety of body types. Niemczyk understands the humor in Cain's script and brings it to life here; she's able to bring Bobbi's montage of stress and interruptions to life in a way that shows Mockingbird as capable while also making the situations funny. Who knew that Iron Man being held by the neck and getting yelled at about quinoa was something we've been missing all these years? There are so many great little touches going on here too, from the hideous wallpaper in each room of the medical center to the carefully constructed shirts and outfits. Even moments like Mockingbird drumming her fingers while having ESP cards shoved in her face again is great, in part because Niemczyk makes it all look natural. Add in some bold and vivid (but never oversaturated) colors from Rosenberg, and this comic just looks gorgeous. I hope the remaining issues are just as much fun, but -- no matter what happens from this point on -- "Mockingbird" #1 is a dynamite debut from Cain, Niemczyk and Rosenberg. Two big, big thumbs up." Jesse Schedeen of IGN gave Mockingbird #1 a grade of 8.6 out of 10, writing, "Marvel's decision to release Mockingbird #1 one week after Mark Waid and Chris Samnee's new Black Widow series kicked off seemed dubious. How is one book about a butt-kicking femme fatale and agent of S.H.I.E.L.D. supposed to thrive in the shadow of another book about a butt-kicking femme fatale and agent of S.H.I.E.L.D.? But as it turns out, the two books could hardly be more different in tone and execution. Mockingbird mixes equal parts Spider-Woman and Howard the Duck for a very entertaining look at the life and times of Bobbi Morse. This new series builds on Mockingbird's current status quo. Having been dosed with a combination of the Super-Soldier Serum and the Infinity Formula, Bobbi is understandably a subject of interest and concern for SHIELD's medical staff. This issue opens as a simple, goofy slice-of-life tale as it follows Bobbi on her many visits to the doctor. But writer Chelsea Cain slowly transitions from humor to paranoia and foreboding as it becomes clear that not all is right in Bobbi's world. [...] Mockingbird's new series could have been a simple effort to cash in on the character's recent mainstream exposure. Luckily, it's something much more ambitious and unique than that. This first issue ditches convention and employs a compelling, purposely disjointed structure to offer a glimpse into Bobbi Morse's crazy life."

== Other versions ==
Bobbi Morse has been depicted in other fictional universes. Some of these include:

=== The Last Avengers Story ===
Set in a distant possible future, writer Peter David's 1995 miniseries The Last Avengers Story depicts Mockingbird as an embittered retiree who cares for her blinded husband Clint Barton. At the story's conclusion, Mockingbird and Hawkeye return to duty and help the Avengers defeat Ultron, Grim Reaper, and Kang.

=== Fantastic Four: Big Town ===
Writer Steve Englehart revisited the Mockingbird and Hawkeye marriage in the 2001 miniseries Fantastic Four: Big Town. Set in a world where the technological advances of Reed Richards have filtered down throughout society, the series shows Mockingbird and Hawkeye as newlyweds and members of the Manhattan-based Avengers. Their relationship comes under familiar strain when Mockingbird kills an assailant in defence of her husband and Hawkeye disapproves of her actions, questioning their necessity. Later in the story, Mockingbird refrains from killing Quicksilver who then goes on to kill Hawkeye. At the story's end, the Avengers consider reviving Barton by placing his brain patterns in the body of the android Vision.

=== "House of M" ===
An alternate universe version of Mockingbird appears in House of M: Avengers. This version is a former member of S.H.I.E.L.D. who was phased out from the organization when mutants became the dominant species. In the penultimate issue of the series, Morse leaves to seek asylum in Wakanda while Hawkeye stays behind.

=== Marvel Zombies ===
A zombified alternate universe version of Mockingbird appears in Marvel Zombies vs. The Army of Darkness #2.

=== Amazing Spider-Man: Renew Your Vows ===
An alternate universe version of Mockingbird appears in The Amazing Spider-Man: Renew Your Vows. This version is part of a secret S.H.I.E.L.D. resistance against Regent.

== In other media ==
=== Television ===
Bobbi Morse / Mockingbird appears in The Avengers: Earth's Mightiest Heroes, voiced by E. G. Daily. This version is a S.H.I.E.L.D. agent with ties to Hawkeye and Black Widow, taking their place in Special Operations when the former joins the Avengers and the latter seemingly goes rogue. Later in the series, she joins Nick Fury's Secret Warriors.

=== Marvel Cinematic Universe ===
Bobbi Morse and Agent 19 of S.H.I.E.L.D. appear as separate characters in media set in the Marvel Cinematic Universe (MCU):

Adrianne Palicki as Morse in Agents of S.H.I.E.L.D.

- Bobbi Morse appears in the MCU television series Agents of S.H.I.E.L.D., portrayed by Adrianne Palicki. Debuting in the episode "A Hen in the Wolf House", she was assigned to work undercover within Daniel Whitehall's Hydra branch to protect Jemma Simmons before extracting her after their cover is blown. Palicki appeared in a recurring role before she was promoted to the series' main cast following the episode "Aftershocks". Additionally, she was previously married to mercenary Lance Hunter, with whom she got back together while working as full-time field agents for S.H.I.E.L.D. Director Phil Coulson until they are forced to leave the organization following an incident in Russia during the episode "Parting Shot".
- A Mockingbird series was in development at ABC Family in 2011. After the successful introduction of the character in Agents of S.H.I.E.L.D., a spin-off titled Marvel's Most Wanted, starring Palicki as Morse and Nick Blood as Hunter, received a pilot order from ABC in August 2015. On May 12, 2016 however, ABC announced it did not pick up Most Wanted for a series.
- In September 2020, Geoffrey Thorne revealed he had written a pilot for Mockingbird, with Palicki reprising the role.
- Laura Barton appears as Agent 19 in the films Avengers: Age of Ultron and Avengers: Endgame as well as the Disney+ miniseries Hawkeye, portrayed by Linda Cardellini.

=== Video games ===
- Mockingbird makes a cameo in Hawkeye's ending in Ultimate Marvel vs. Capcom 3 as a member of his new West Coast Avengers.
- Mockingbird appears as a playable character in Marvel Avengers Alliance.
- Mockingbird appears as a playable character in Lego Marvel's Avengers. Additionally, the Agents of S.H.I.E.L.D. incarnation is also featured as DLC.
- Mockingbird appears as a playable character in Marvel Avengers Academy.
- Mockingbird appears as a playable character in Marvel: Future Fight.
- Mockingbird appears as a playable character in Marvel Puzzle Quest.
- Mockingbird appears in Marvel Snap.

== Collected editions ==
Title	Material collected	Year	ISBN
Mockingbird – Bobbi Morse Agent of S.H.I.E.L.D.	Astonishing Tales #10, #12–13, #15–20, Ka-Zar #3–5, Marvel Team-Up #95, Hawkeye #1–4, material from Astonishing Tales #8, Savage Tales #8 and Marvel Super Action #1	August 2016	978-1302900861
New Avengers: The Reunion	New Avengers: The Reunion #1-4, and material from Dark Reign: New Nation	March 2010	978-0785138556
Hawkeye & Mockingbird: Ghosts	Hawkeye & Mockingbird #1-6 and material from Enter the Heroic Age	January 2011	978-0785144182
Hawkeye & Mockingbird/Black Widow: Widowmaker	Widowmaker #1-4 and Solo Avengers #14-16.	March 2011	978-0785152057
Mockingbird Vol. 1 – I Can Explain	Mockingbird S.H.I.E.L.D. 50th Anniversary #1, Mockingbird #1–5	November 2016	978-1302901226
Mockingbird Vol. 2 – My Feminist Agenda	Mockingbird #6–8, New Avengers (vol. 1) #13–14	April 2017	978-1302901233
