= Locksmith (disambiguation) =

A locksmith is one who practices locksmithing, making and defeating locks.

Locksmith may also refer to:

- Locksmith (rapper), an American rapper
- "Locksmith" (song), a song by Tee Grizzley on the album Scriptures
- Locksmith (computing), a reboot manager for Container Linux
- Locksmith (comics), a Marvel Comics character
- Locksmith (DC Comics), one of the many fictional alter-egos of villain Carl Draper in DC Comics
- Locksmith Animation, a British animation studio
- The Locksmith (TV series), a six-part British drama
- The Locksmith (film), an American film

== See also ==
- The Lucksmiths, an Australian indi pop band
