= Sarnak (comics) =

Sarnak or Sarnak, Master of Sound

Publication information
- Publisher: Marvel Comics
- First appearance: Werewolf by Night #9 (Sept. 1973)
- Created by: Gerry Conway and Tom Sullivan

In-story information
- Alter ego: Sidney Sarnak (given name)
- Team affiliations: The Committee
- Abilities: Control Whistle

Sarnak (legal name Sidney Sarnak) is a fictional character appearing in American comic books published by Marvel Comics. The character is depicted as a villain with a mastery of sound in the Marvel Comics universe. Sarnak (or Sarnak, Master of Sound, as he refers to himself) first appeared in Werewolf by Night #9.

== Publication history ==
Sarnak was created by Gerry Conway and Tom Sullivan and made his first appearance in Werewolf by Night, issue #9, September 1973. His last known appearance came in Werewolf by Night, #10 where it's suggested, by creators Gerry Conway and Tom Sullivan, he died.

== Fictional character biography ==
Sarnak was born Sidney Sarnak, and was known as a great sound engineer in the recording business. He got into legal trouble for being involved in an operation to bootleg albums from popular artists. He attempted to escape persecution, and ended up scarring his face "for life", as he put it. He covered his scars by wearing a green mask.

While healing from his injuries, he studied sound further and as a result, he created a whistle that would allow him to control the minds of anyone hearing it. He joined The Committee and used the whistle to create an army of homeless derelicts, which he named "The Legion of Fear". At the request of The Committee, Sarnak attempted to capture Jack Russell and his sister because they were werewolves. (Sarnak was unaware that the committee had a special interest in werewolves ). The first attempt failed, with Jack fighting two of the legion of fear's derelicts to a draw. At the second attempt, Sarnak knocked out Jack by blowing his whistle. He brought Jack to his hideout, in the sewers below Los Angeles and made Jack obey him and cause chaos in the city of Los Angeles, in his werewolf form. Sarnak captured his sister, but Jack managed to get away and seek assistance from another sound engineer to create a device that would prevent Jack from hearing Sarnak's whistle. With the device secured to his arm, Jack came back the following night and invaded Sarnak's headquarters and freed his sister. Sarnak attempted to use his whistle on Jack (in werewolf form), however, due to the device on Jack's arm, the whistle fails to work on him. Jack is able to defeat Sarnak, Sarnak loses his hold on the Legion of fear, who unmask him and, it's hinted, kill him.

== Powers and abilities ==
Powers: - None

Abilities: - Superb sound engineer, inventor of his control whistle.
