= Daddy Longlegs (comics) =

Ramsey Kole Daddy Longlegs

Publication information
- Publisher: Marvel Comics
- First appearance: Spider-Woman #47 (December 1982)
- Created by: Ann Nocenti; Brian Postman

In-story information
- Species: Human mutate
- Notable aliases: Daddy Longlegs; Crazy Legs
- Abilities: Superhuman strength; Skilled dancer

Daddy Longlegs (Ramsey Kole) is a character appearing in American comic books published by Marvel Comics. Created by writer Ann Nocenti and artist Brian Postman, the character first appeared in Spider-Woman #47 (December 1982). Kole is an adversary of the superheroine Jessica Drew / Spider-Woman.

== Publication history ==
Ramsey Kole debuted in Spider-Woman #47 (December 1982), and was created by Ann Nocenti and Brian Postman.

== Fictional character biography ==
Ramsey Kole was a dancer of short stature who stole and drank some experimental chemicals that Bill Foster was working on, and grew to a height of 15 feet with elongated arms and legs. Spider-Woman went looking for him. Now calling himself Daddy Longlegs, Kole confronts Spider-Woman, but she defeats him, leaving him a dejected emotional wreck.

Daddy Longlegs is captured by the Locksmith along with a number of other superhumans, but they are freed by Spider-Woman. She throws a party for Kole and the other escapees, who are forced to forget her when she is believed to be dead.

Daddy Longlegs is restored to a normal height by Dr. Karl Malus, who uses samples from Ramsey Kole to empower Erik Josten.

== Powers and abilities ==
Ramsey Kole is a skilled dancer, possessing exceptional agility and speed. As Daddy Longlegs, he retained these abilities and stood approximately 15 feet tall, while possessing superhuman strength (Enhanced Human to Class 10). His agility and slender build made him a difficult target to hit. He also wielded a steel cane as a weapon, with a sharp base.
