= Locksmith (comics) =

Publication information
- Publisher: Marvel Comics
- First appearance: Spider-Woman #50 (Jun 1983)
- Created by: Ann Nocenti; Brian Postman

The Locksmith is a fictional character appearing in American comic books published by Marvel Comics.

== Publication history ==
The Locksmith appeared in Spider-Woman #50 (June 1983), and was created by Ann Nocenti and Brian Postman.

== Fictional character biography ==
The Locksmith was a lock designer and escape artist who believed that the feats of super-powered beings have overshadowed the achievements of ordinary humans. For this reason, he captured super-powered beings in San Francisco and imprisoned them within specially designed cells.

The mutant Tick-Tock assisted the Locksmith in capturing various super-heroes and villains and keeping them in the Locksmith's prisons. Their captives included Tigra, Poltergeist, Angar the Screamer, Flying Tiger, Gypsy Moth, Killer Shrike, Needle, Tatterdemalion, the Werewolf, Daddy Longlegs, Nekra, Enforcer, Hangman, and Dansen Macabre.

Locksmith and Tick-Tock soon captured Spider-Woman as well, imprisoning her with their other captives. Tick-Tock used his power to help prevent break-outs, anticipating such attempts before they could happen. Spider-Woman convinced Tigra to make Poltergeist angry enough to start a fight, in which they shorted out their specially designed prisons. Spider-Woman then convinced Gypsy Moth to use her powers to swap their costumes. Tick-Tock did not foresee this change, so Spider-Woman was placed in the cell designed for Gypsy Moth, Spider-Woman broke free and released everyone else. After everyone was free, Locksmith collapsed with a nervous breakdown. Gypsy Moth restrained Locksmith and Tick-Tock so the authorities could apprehend them.
