= Satannish =

Publication information
- Publisher: Marvel Comics
- First appearance: Doctor Strange #174 (November 1968)
- Created by: Roy Thomas; Gene Colan

In-story information
- Species: Demon
- Team affiliations: Masters of Evil
- Notable aliases: Nick Cloot
- Abilities: Vast supernatural powers

Satannish is a character appearing in American comic books published by Marvel Comics.

== Publication history ==
Satannish first appeared in Doctor Strange #174 and was created by writer Roy Thomas artist and Gene Colan.

== Fictional character biography ==
Satannish is a powerful extra-dimensional demon who is known for granting mortals mystical power in exchange for their souls. He has been referred to as a creation and agent of Dormammu, and the father of Daimon Hellstrom.

He has granted power to his cult, the Sons of Satannish, and struck a pact with the human sorcerer Lord Nekron, first encountering Doctor Strange during this affair. Satannish also bargained with Baron Mordo during the "Faust Gambit" incident. He battled Mephisto in New York City and briefly fused with him as a result of Strange's spell, revealing that they were formed from the same demonic energy.

Satannish later hides in the shadow of Mephista, Mephisto's daughter, to enter Mephisto's domain. There, he battles Mephisto, Mephista, and Doctor Strange, and is killed when Strange mystically connects Mephisto and Satannish's life forces.

During the Secret Invasion storyline, Satannish is one of many dark powers imprisoned within Avalon. He is freed, along with all the others, when Pete Wisdom releases Merlin. After hearing the invading Skrulls boast that they will subjugate all magical beings, Satannish and the others kill the Skrull forces invading Avalon.

In Avengers Undercover, Satannish appears as a member of the Masters of Evil. He is shown to have taken up residence in Bagalia.

== Powers and abilities ==
Satannish is a demonic being of pure mystical energy, an embodiment of evil. The guise he most often employs around human sorcerers is that of a green horned being with a second face in his stomach. Satannish is more akin to a supernatural force of nature than a being; as such he possesses "virtually unlimited" mystic power which can be used for a variety of effects, including inter-dimensional teleportation, manipulation of time, space, and matter, size transformations, casting bolts of mystic energy as destructive force, demonic possession, and physical strength and durability. The character's extent of power has been shown as equal to that of Mephisto. Satannish's ability to manifest in the dimension of Earth is, in some unknown way, limited by mystic factors and he frequently makes use of pawns native to Earth for his purposes. He also proved to be powerful enough to easily kill all the invading Skrulls who attempted to take Avalon's magic, which no other magical being in Avalon was able to do.

== In other media ==
Satannish makes a cameo appearance in Morrigan Aensland's ending in Marvel vs. Capcom 3: Fate of Two Worlds.
