= Tigra =

Marvel Comics superhero

- Tigra. Art by Mike Deodato.

Publication information
- Publisher: Marvel Comics
- First appearance: As the Cat: The Claws of the Cat #1 (November 1972) As Tigra: Giant-Size Creatures #1 (July 1974)
- Created by: The Cat: Roy Thomas; Linda Fite; Wally Wood; Marie Severin; Tigra: Jenny Blake Isabella; Don Perlin

In-story information
- Alter ego: Greer Grant Nelson
- Species: Human mutate (Cat Person)
- Team affiliations: Avengers Resistance; The Battalion; The Initiative; Avengers; Fantastic Four; West Coast Avengers; Lady Liberators; Avengers Academy; New Warriors; Fearless Defenders
- Notable aliases: The Cat; Greer Sorenson; Werecat; Were-Woman; Weretiger
- Abilities: Superhuman strength, speed, agility, durability, stamina, reflexes, and senses; Retractable fangs and claws; Empathy

Tigra (Greer Grant Nelson) is a superhero appearing in American comic books published by Marvel Comics. Created by writer-editor Roy Thomas and artist Wally Wood (Marie Severin was then brought in to help layout the art), with her early adventures written by Linda Fite, the character first appeared as the superpowered and gadget-wielding crime fighter the Cat in The Claws of the Cat #1 (November 1972). She first appeared as Tigra in Giant-Size Creatures #1 (July 1974), by writer Jenny Blake Isabella and artist Don Perlin.

== Publication history ==
The Cat was introduced in one of a trio of Marvel Comics aimed at a female audience, alongside Night Nurse and Shanna the She-Devil. Marvel writer-editor Roy Thomas recalled in 2007:

[Editor-in-chief Stan Lee] had the idea, and I think the names, for all three. He wanted to do some books that would have special appeal to girls. We were always looking for way to expand our franchise. My idea...was to try to get women to write them. And of course, if we could get a woman to draw them, too, that was great. Stan tapped [artist] Marie [Severin]...for The Cat. ...[Writer] Linda Fite was working on staff, had done a couple of X-Men back-up features".

Marie Severin commented on the characters design stating "They wanted her to look like a cat. The sash was my idea, I'm pretty sure. The sash was just an element of flair, not having a tail. She had something on her feet so she could climb buildings. that all made sense in the realm of the nonsense of comic books"

Claws of the Cat #1 by Fite and Severin was published in November 1972. The series lasted four issues, each with a different art team. Severin was teamed with acclaimed 1950s EC Comics artist Wally Wood as inker for the premiere, followed by Severin and inker Jim Mooney in issue #2; newcomer Paty Greer co-penciling with 1940s Golden Age of Comic Books legend Bill Everett, who also inked, in issue #3; and Jim Starlin and Alan Weiss co-penciling the finale, with Frank McLaughlin inking. A fifth issue of the series was drawn by Ramona Fradon, but the title was cancelled due to lack of sales on previous issues. Severin attributes the character's sensual appearance to Wood: "I remember saying, 'My God, I drew this woman and Wally inked her like she's wrapped in Saran Wrap.' His storytelling always had lovely inking, nice blacks and everything, but I didn't have her that revealing. The boys loved his work, though."

The Cat appeared alongside Spider-Man in Marvel Team-Up #8 (April 1973) during her series' brief run. After a year's absence, she was revamped as the superpowered, part-animal Tigra in a two-part story in Giant-Size Creatures #1 (July 1974; "Giant-Size" refers to the comic's page-count, not giant creatures) and Werewolf by Night #20 (August 1974). Writer Jenny Blake Isabella recounted "My memory may be a bit shaky here, but I recall the Giant-Size books were approved and put on the schedule without a lot of lead time... I think I got the assignment one day, pitched the idea on the next, and one day later was sitting down with Roy [Thomas] and Gil Kane to work out what Tigra would look like." He also names Don Perlin and John Romita Sr. as having a hand in Tigra's appearance, and credits Thomas with coming up with the name. Tigra made her solo-feature debut with a 15-page story in the black-and-white horror-comics magazine Monsters Unleashed #10 (February 1975), followed by a brief run in the umbrella series Marvel Chillers #3-7 (February–October 1976), and one more solo story in Marvel Premiere #42 (June 1978). Like The Claws of the Cat, Marvel Chillers was also cancelled due to struggling sales.

Tigra went on to guest star throughout the Marvel line, often appearing in issues of the superhero-team comic The Avengers and later in the cast of the spin-off comic West Coast Avengers. She starred in the four-issue miniseries Tigra (May–August 2002) by writer Christina Z. and artist Mike Deodato, and has since guest starred in She-Hulk, Civil War, various Avengers comics, and elsewhere.

Tigra appeared as a supporting character in Avengers Academy from issue #1 (August 2010) to its final issue, #39 (January 2013).

== Fictional character biography ==
=== The Cat ===
The Claws of the Cat #1 (November 1972), cover art by Marie Severin and Wally Wood

Greer Grant was a native of Chicago, Illinois. She was a sophomore at the University of Chicago when she met policeman Bill Nelson, and she left college to marry him. During this marriage Bill took control of her autonomy, disallowing her from returning to college or doing everyday tasks herself. Bill was killed in an off-duty shooting, leaving Greer to find a job of her own. After weeks of searching, she ran into her old physics professor, Dr. Joanne Tumolo, and signed on as her research assistant.

Tumolo was working on human enhancement methods effective for women. For several reasons, including distrust for the haphephobic Malcolm Donalbain (Tumolo's financial backer), distaste for Shirlee Bryant (his chosen subject), and Greer's own enthusiasm, Tumolo decided to let her friend undergo the treatment as well. Greer emerged from the regimen with greatly enhanced physical and mental capabilities, including the ability to feel others' pain. Shirlee gained similar physical capacity but considerably less mental empowerment, a result blamed on her lack of adherence to the preparatory regimen.

Tumolo investigated further, and discovered that Donalbain had created a mind-control device and a set of cat-themed gadgets, with which he intended to make Shirlee his mindless superhuman enforcer. However, Shirlee fell to her death while testing the grapple-claw.

Tumolo presented the story to Greer, along with a spare Cat costume and gadget-set as evidence. However, Tumolo is killed in a bombing before she can inform the police. Greer then donned the suit, and set out to put an end to his scheme. With her powers, she adapted quickly to the strange garb and attacked Donalbain's headquarters and he committed suicide rather than let her touch him. A fire set off by the earlier fight then destroyed Donalbain's headquarters, including his copy of the enhancement machine.

=== Tigra ===
"The Tigra" is the historical defender and champion of the Cat People, a humanoid race created by sorcery during the Middle Ages. Concerned about the Cat People's uncontrollable population growth and savagery, a community of sorcerers banished them to a demonic netherworldly realm.

The first two Cat People, who were capable scientists and sorcerers, evaded banishment through their magic. They continued to live among humanity in secret and worked to refine the Cat People's biology to make a peaceful integration into the human population possible. They were constantly persecuted and required a protector. Discovering that the original spell for transforming cats into Cat People like themselves had been rendered inoperative, they created a process combining science, sorcery, and focused mental power that could transform a human female into a "Tigra", a humanoid tiger-like being with abilities that far surpassed those of either race.

Dr. Tumolo was among the modern Cat People. When members of Hydra tracked Tumolo down to obtain "the Final Secret" (the Black Death plague, which was another creation of the Cat People), Greer once again donned the Cat costume and drove them off. However, she was mortally injured by a blast from one of their alpha radiation pistols. Rapidly dying from the radiation's effects, Greer is transformed into a Tigra to save her life. Though initially unable to change back to her human self, Tigra later receives a mystical cat-headed amulet that allows her to transform at will. She seldom uses the amulet, preferring her feline form and mostly abandoning her civilian identity. Tigra joins the Avengers after Moondragon uses her mental powers to compel a dozen unaffiliated heroes to audition.

After leaving the Avengers, Tigra resumes her modeling career, moving to San Francisco when employers on the East Coast proved unreceptive to the idea of a cat person model. Tigra accepts an offer from Vision to become a founding member of the West Coast Avengers.

Tigra seeks help from her Avengers teammates in overcoming the "cat" side of her personality. She is transported with the West Coast Avengers by Balkatar to the realm of the Cat People. Ultimately, she came into contact with the banished colony of Cat People, whose king agreed to resolve her crisis in exchange for carrying out her historical function by murdering Master Pandemonium. Though Tigra initially accepts their terms, she refuses to violate the Avengers' code against killing, sparing Master Pandemonium. In response, the Cat People strips Tigra of her powers. In the ensuing battle, Tigra regains her powers and successfully integrates her human and feline selves. She also loses the ability to shift back to a human form, though as before she showed no sense of loss for her human identity.

After returning to the team, Tigra transforms into a more animal-like feline form, losing her human intellect completely and becoming a danger to her fellow Avengers. Tigra is shrunken to the size of a cat by Hank Pym and kept in a cage in his lab while the team tended to other urgent matters. Tigra escapes into the suburbs, where she lives as a wild animal until she is rescued and restored to her former appearance and stability by Agatha Harkness.

During a fight with the Pacific Overlords, Iron Man is incapacitated and Tigra wounded. Tigra escapes in the Avengers' Quinjet, but loses consciousness and crash-lands in Arnhem Land. Rescued by Aborigines, she decides to stay put while recovering, naming Spider-Woman (Julia Carpenter) as her replacement.

Tigra and the Avengers are entrapped by Morgan le Fay and brought to an alternate universe where le Fay rules, fighting alongside the others as one of the "queen"'s guards. After the defeat of Morgan, Tigra leaves for space with Starfox. Tigra returns to Earth with the Avengers Infinity team during the Maximum Security storyline, during which she helped to save Earth from becoming a penal colony for alien criminals.

=== Civil War ===
Tigra fought along Iron Man's side during the Civil War, supporting the Superhuman Registration Act. Pretending to switch allegiances, she infiltrates Captain America's Secret Avengers team as a mole. She passes information to Iron Man undetected until the end of the conflict, when she is discovered and "outed" by Captain America's own spy Hulkling.

=== The Initiative ===
Tigra is among the 142 registered superheroes who are part of the Fifty State Initiative. She is a founding instructor at Camp Hammond, the training compound for the Initiative, and resumes her romantic relationship with Yellowjacket, unaware that he had been kidnapped and replaced by a Skrull duplicate.

After the Skrull invasion, Tigra believes herself to be pregnant by Yellowjacket, though she is unsure if the father is the real Yellowjacket or his Skrull impostor. She tells Trauma that she has decided to terminate the pregnancy regardless of the father's identity. Tigra leaves Camp Hammond for Arkansas, planning to train Razorback.

When Norman Osborn tells Tigra that he was going to take her baby for genetic testing and that he had made the Hood the chief operating officer of the Initiative, Tigra goes on the run with Gauntlet. Now wanted as an outlaw, she began exacting personal vengeance on members of the Hood's gang. Tigra gives birth to what is apparently a normal Cat Person kitten during the transition between Tony Stark's administration of the Initiative and Osborn's. She names the child William, after her late husband.

=== Heroic Age ===
Following the arrest and incarceration of Norman Osborn, the dismantling of his criminal superhero teams, and the repeal of the Superhuman Registration Act, Steve Rogers (Captain America) is named the United States's head of national security. Rogers seeks to assemble a collection of heroes to inspire the nation and the world as a new organization of Avengers, with Tigra being among them. Tigra is part of the founding faculty of Avengers Academy, training a new generation of heroes in the traditions of the world's elite superhero team.

During this time, Tigra learns that the Skrull posing as Pym was indeed William's father. However, he had disguised himself as Pym at the genetic level, making Pym William's genetic father. After learning this, Tigra asks Pym to take care of William in the event of anything happening to her.

Tigra appeared in the Fresh Start revival of the West Coast Avengers, in which she had been changed into a feral, 200-foot tall form. After the new West Coast Avengers roster defeats Tigra, they work on stopping other feral giant women mutated into such by MODOK in his failed quest for love. Once returned to her original self, Tigra thanks the WCA before leaving to hunt down MODOK.

During the 17th birthday party for Nadia van Dyne, the long lost daughter of Hank Pym, Tigra introduced William to Nadia as her half-brother. With the introduction serving as her birthday gift, Tigra had tears of joy that Nadia happily accepted her new brother and would be a big part in William's life.

== Powers and abilities ==
Tigra's powers are the result of a combination of science, magic, and mental energy utilized by Dr. Joanne Marie Tumolo and the other Cat People. Her physical appearance is distinctly cat-like. A thick, sleek coat of orange fur with black stripes covers her entire body. She has pointed ears, sharper-than-normal teeth with pronounced upper and lower canines, eyes with enlarged irises and vertically slit pupils, and retractable claws on her feet and hands instead of nails. Her claws and teeth are sufficiently strong to puncture sheet steel, such as that found in a car body. Tigra also has a long semi-prehensile tail, and can willfully contact (but not grasp and lift) objects with it. Tigra's feline physiology grants her various superhuman attributes including superhuman strength, speed, stamina, agility, reflexes, senses, and resistance to physical injury. If she is injured, her physiology enables her to heal much faster and more extensively than an ordinary human.

Tigra's thick coat of fur prevents her from losing body heat quickly. She has stated that she wears bikinis partly because a full set of clothes over her fur would cause her to overheat in warm environments and possibly pass out. In addition, she is completely comfortable with her feline appearance and is not annoyed by the inevitable attention.

Tigra possesses a mystical talisman that allows her to change her appearance from feline to human at will. She rarely uses it and only appears in her human form whenever circumstances require it. She regards her feline body as her natural form.

She formerly possessed what was referred to as a "cat-soul" in addition to her "human soul". Though vaguely defined, her "two souls" were consistently depicted merely as a means to describe her conflicting human and feline instincts, and not as separate personalities or personas, and her "cat soul" was not the soul of any specific Cat Person from the past. Regardless of the definition of her "two souls", they were fully merged during Greer's second, more complete transformation into the legendary figure.

Greer received a form of empathic ability when she became the Cat. She retains this ability as Tigra. With careful concentration, she can sense the emotions of others within her immediate proximity. She appears to prefer to achieve this same effect through her enhanced feline senses.

Tigra is an experienced hand-to-hand combatant with a fighting style that incorporates her feline speed, agility, senses, and instincts. She is a superhumanly adept athlete and gymnast. Like all Avengers of her generation, she has sparred and trained extensively with Steve Rogers, the original Captain America.

She is an experienced leader and pilot, qualified to operate Avengers aircraft as well as interstellar spacecraft.

While working undercover in human guise, Tigra attended the New York Police Academy to investigate the decade-old murder of her husband Bill Nelson. After bringing the murderers to justice, she completed her training under her Greer Grant Nelson identity. While she does not serve as an active-duty police officer, she retains legal authority under both her civilian and superpowered identities and unofficial ties to the police community.

Tigra possesses mystical abilities that have largely gone unexplored. In addition to using her mystic talisman to change her appearance from feline to human and back, she has been shown magically summoning the Balkatar, the Cat People's designated emissary to the Earthly plane. When Doctor Strange abdicated his position as Sorcerer Supreme, the Eye of Agamotto created a vision showing the many mystic beings who were potentially worthy or capable of assuming the title. An image of Tigra was included in this vision.

== Other versions ==
Many alternate universe versions of Tigra have appeared throughout the character's publication history.

- In Marvel Adventures, Tigra is initially a private investigator before joining the Avengers.
- In House of M, Tigra is a member of the Avengers who is in a relationship with Luke Cage and is later killed saving him from Taskmaster.
- In the Marvel Mangaverse, Tigra is Doctor Strange's assistant and was cursed to remain in her cat form until she completes 1,000 good deeds.
- In the Ultimate Marvel universe, Tigra is Marie Grant, a police officer who was imprisoned for using excessive force and gained her powers after being augmented S.H.I.E.L.D.
- Greer Baptise / Wentigra, a composite character based on Tigra and Wendigo, appears in "Infinity Wars".

== Reception ==
=== Accolades ===
- In 2011, Comics Buyer's Guide ranked Tigra 61st in their "100 Sexiest Women in Comics" list.
- In 2018, The Mary Sue ranked Tigra 4th in their "7 Female Superheroes Who Should Join Marvel’s Cinematic Universe" list.
- In 2021, Comic Book Resources (CBR) ranked Tigra 17th in their "20 Most Powerful Female Members Of The Avengers" list.
- In 2022, Screen Rant included Tigra in their "10 Iconic West Coast Avengers" list, in their "10 Best Street-Level Heroes Not Yet In The MCU" list, and in their "10 Most Powerful Members Of The Lady Liberators" list.
- In 2022, CBR ranked Tigra 3rd in their "10 Best Cat-Themed Superheroes In Comics" list.

== In other media ==
=== Television ===
- Tigra appears in The Avengers: United They Stand, voiced by Lenore Zann. This version was an athlete who underwent genetic treatments to give her a competitive edge, but was left resembling an anthropomorphic tiger and gained superhuman abilities. Following this, she became a member of the Avengers.
- Hulu intended to air a Tigra & Dazzler animated series to be written and executive produced by Erica Rivinoja and Chelsea Handler. Additionally, the two would have also teamed up with MODOK, Hit-Monkey, and Howard the Duck in the animated special The Offenders. In December 2019 however, Rivinoja and the entire writing staff were fired due to creative differences, though Handler was still attached to the project. In January 2020, it was announced that Tigra & Dazzler, along with the Howard the Duck series, was cancelled, making The Offenders unlikely.
- Tigra appears in Lego Marvel Avengers: Strange Tails, voiced by Catherine Taber.

=== Film ===
The Avengers: United They Stand incarnation of Tigra appears in Chip 'n Dale: Rescue Rangers, voiced by Liz Cackowski.

=== Video games ===
- Tigra appears in Hawkeye's ending in Ultimate Marvel vs. Capcom 3 as a member of his West Coast Avengers.
- Tigra appears as a playable character in Marvel Super Hero Squad Online, voiced by Grey DeLisle.
- Tigra appears as a playable character in Marvel: Avengers Alliance.
- Tigra appears as a playable character in Lego Marvel's Avengers.
- A teenage version of Tigra appears in Marvel Avengers Academy, voiced by Bella Thorne.
- Tigra appears as a playable character in Marvel Contest of Champions.

=== Miscellaneous ===
Tigra appears in The Avengers: United They Stand tie-in comic book series.

=== Toys and collectibles ===
- In 1997, a Tigra action figure reworked from a preexisting Black Cat figure was released as part of Toy Biz's Marvel Hall of Fame: She-Force line.
- In 2000, an action figure based on The Avengers: United They Stand incarnation of Tigra was released as part of Toy Biz's "Avengers United" tie-in toy line.
- In 2006, Bowen Designs released a Tigra mini-bust sculpted by Jim Maddox and based largely on a 2001 sketch by Sean Chen.
- In 2009, Hasbro released a Tigra action figure as part of their Marvel Legends line, reflecting her appearance in the then-current mainstream Marvel continuity.
- In 2021, Hasbro released an updated Tigra figure as part of their retro carded line, representing her time with the West Coast Avengers.
- In 2023, Hasbro released a new variation of their previous Tigra action figure, as part of a West Coast Avengers 5 pack box set. This version's lighter coloring and new headsculpt more accurately represents Tigra during her tenure with the team in the 80's.

== Collected editions ==
Title	Material collected	Published date	ISBN
Tigra: The Complete Collection	The Cat #1-4, Marvel Team-Up #8, 67, 125, Giant-Size Creatures #1, Marvel Chillers #3-7, Marvel Two-In-One #19, Marvel Premiere #42, Tigra #1-4, material from Monsters Unleashed #10	December 2019	978-1302920692
