= Shroud (character) =

Superhero in the Marvel Universe

Maximillian Coleridge Shroud
- Shroud as depicted in Solo Avengers #3 (February 1988). Art by Mark D. Bright.

Publication information
- Publisher: Marvel Comics
- First appearance: Super-Villain Team-Up #5 (April 1976)
- Created by: Steve Englehart (writer); Herb Trimpe (artist)

In-story information
- Alter ego: Maximillian Quincy Coleridge
- Species: Human
- Team affiliations: Heroes for Hire; Cult of Kali; Night Shift
- Notable aliases: Master of Darkness; Michael Wyatt; Moon Knight
- Abilities: Darkforce manipulation; Can "see" through walls and darkness; Flight; Carries explosive "bombarangs"; Adept acrobat and infiltrator; Olympic-level athlete; Trained martial artist

Maximillian Quincy Coleridge is a superhero appearing in American comic books published by Marvel Comics. Created by writer Steve Englehart and artist Herb Trimpe, the character first appeared in Super-Villain Team-Up #5 (April 1976). Coleridge, primarily known as Shroud, set out to establish himself as the world's greatest hero. To maintain his guise as a villain, he assumed leadership of the supervillain team Night Shift, often manipulating its members into performing heroic acts without their knowledge. Inspired by his encounters with the West Coast Avengers—particularly Moon Knight—Coleridge later aspired to carry on Marc Spector's legacy by becoming the next Moon Knight.

== Development ==
=== Concept and creation ===
Steve Englehart stated that the character Maximillian Coleridge was conceived as a "mashup" of DC Comics' Batman and The Shadow. He explained, "As a Marvel writer, I thought I'd never get to write the Batman, so I took some Bat-traits and mixed them with some Shadow-traits so as not to get sued and made my own homage to those dark night characters."

=== Publication history ===
Maximillian Coleridge debuted in Super-Villain Team-Up #5 (April 1976), created by Steve Englehart and Herb Trimpe. He subsequently appeared in several Marvel series, including Shroud (1994), Phases of the Moon Knight (2024), and Vengeance of the Moon Knight (2024).

== Fictional character biography ==
At the age of 10, Maximillian Coleridge saw his parents gunned down right before his eyes. He decided to dedicate his life to fighting crime. After graduating college, he joined the mysterious temple called the "Cult of Kali", where he studied various styles of martial arts. After seven years of intense training, he graduated from that temple. During the celebration ceremony, he was branded with the Kiss of Kali, a red-hot iron. This process left him blind, but gave him a mystic extrasensory perception. Traveling back to the United States, he adopted the masked identity of Shroud. (Note: Origin revealed in Super-Villain Team-Up #7)

Shroud invades Latveria, intending to kill Doctor Doom for his crimes against humanity. However, he helps Doom and Captain America oppose the Red Skull, who is considered a worse criminal. Shroud is shot by a ray built by the Red Skull while Doom battles Red Skull on the moon. Shroud is rescued by Captain America, while the Red Skull is left on the Moon, while Captain America returns Shroud to Earth. After recovering, Shroud discovers that he is able to manipulate Darkforce energy.

Shroud goes undercover in Los Angeles and founds the Night Shift, building a reputation as a criminal to destroy crime from within. Behind the scenes, Shroud makes a deal with the West Coast Avengers not to interfere with his activities underground.

When the Superhero Registration Act was proposed by the United States during the Civil War storyline, Shroud refused to accept the proposal to give up his secret identity. He and Julia Carpenter attempt to flee to Canada, but are captured by Wonder Man and Ms. Marvel. Shroud escapes and joins Captain America's anti-registration group.

Following the death of Marc Spector, a new individual takes up the Moon Knight moniker. After coming into conflict with Spector's allies running his Midnight Mission, he is eventually unmasked and revealed to be Shroud.

== Powers and abilities ==
Maximilian Coleridge was struck blind but granted heightened mystic senses, giving him a radar-like perception that allows him to perceive his surroundings and detect movement through walls. He later developed the ability to manipulate darkness and shadows, drawing power from the Darkforce dimension. He can generate and shape darkness into gaseous, solid, or shadowy forms, including humanoid constructs. Coleridge has mastered multiple combat disciplines and employs an array of specialized weapons, such as an asbestos-lined cape, magnesium bombs, paralyzing mists, bomb-a-rangs, titanium nets, and a collapsible glider built into his cape that enables short-distance flight. His costume is bullet-resistant, further enhancing his combat effectiveness. Furthermore, Coleridge commands extensive resources through his family company and his criminal network, most notably as the leader of the Night Shift. He has operated from several bases, including a jazz club, a fortified estate, and the Tower of Shadows, an ancient castle equipped with traps such as dart launchers, wall spikes, and pits of fire.

== In other media ==
Shroud appears as a playable character in Lego Marvel Super Heroes 2 as part of the "Cloak and Dagger" DLC.
