= West Coast Avengers =

Comic book superhero team

- The West Coast Avengers vol. 2 #1 (Oct. 1985) by Al Milgrom and Joe Sinnott.

Publication information
- Publisher: Marvel Comics
- First appearance: The West Coast Avengers #1 (September 1984)
- Created by: Roger Stern; Bob Hall

In-story information
- Base(s): Avengers Compound, Palos Verdes, California
- Member(s): List of West Coast Avengers members

The West Coast Avengers is a fictional group of superheroes appearing in American comic books published by Marvel Comics. The team first appeared in The West Coast Avengers #1 (Sept. 1984), created by Roger Stern and Bob Hall. It was the first spin-off publication for the Avengers.

Following the 1984 limited series, the West Coast Avengers were the focus of an ongoing series published from October 1985 to January 1994. Volume 3 began publication in September 2018 as part of the Fresh Start relaunch but was cancelled after 10 issues. A fourth volume launched in November 2024.

== Publication history ==
The West Coast Avengers first appeared in a four-issue limited series published from September to December 1984. The series was written by Roger Stern and drawn by Bob Hall and Brett Breeding. This was followed by a 102-issue series of the same name that ran from October 1985 to January 1994. The series was initially written by Steve Englehart and drawn by Al Milgrom and Joe Sinnott. It was the first spin-off series for the Avengers. The series was renamed Avengers West Coast on the cover of issue #47 (Aug. 1989).

In 2018, a new incarnation of the West Coast Avengers appeared in the "Fresh Start" that consists of Hawkeye, Kate Bishop, Gwenpool, America Chavez, Quentin Quire, and Kate's boyfriend Johnny Watts who takes the codename Fuse. Jeff the Land Shark had his first appearance in issue #7 (January 2019). The ongoing series was written by Kelly Thompson and initially drawn by Stefano Caselli. It was cancelled as of issue #10 cover dated June 2019.

In November 2024, Volume 4 began publication with writer Gerry Duggan and artist Danny Kim. In this series, Iron Man and War Machine assemble a new West Coast Avengers roster which includes Spider-Woman, Firestar, Ultron and Blue Bolt.

== Fictional team biography ==
=== Original run (1984–1994) ===
The team is founded by the Avenger Hawkeye in response to a suggestion by fellow Avenger, the Vision, who at the time (as team chairman) wished to expand the Avengers' influence. Hawkeye recruits Mockingbird, Wonder Man, Tigra, and Iron Man, with the last actually being Jim Rhodes as opposed to Tony Stark, a fact initially unknown to the team.

The team takes on Hank Pym as a scientific advisor and compound manager. Pym and Moon Knight formally join, while Iron Man is expelled for his actions during the Armor Wars. The "Lost in Space-Time" storyline began in issue #17 (February 1987) when Dominus sent the team back in time. The marriage of Hawkeye and Mockingbird is placed in jeopardy when Mockingbird allows the Phantom Rider to die in a fall for deceiving and raping her.

After a trip to Hungary to investigate a report on Wasp, Scarlet Witch, and Vision assist the team. Mockingbird, Tigram and Moon Knight leave the team together as a new short-lived team called the Ex-WACOs over the Avengers' rule against killing in regards to Mockingbird's encounter with Phantom Rider. The Vision and the Scarlet Witch join the team as to not leave it short handed. Vision is abducted and dismantled by the government; Pym rebuilds Vision, but with a chalk-white complexion. Wonder Man refuses to allow his brain patterns to be used again to provide a matrix for Vision's emotions, leading Vision emotionless. U.S. Agent is assigned to the team as a watchdog by the government to monitor the team's activities.

A group of superhumans decide to mimic the Avengers and become the Great Lakes Avengers, while the original Human Torch returns from his own apparent demise. This casts doubt on the identity of Vision, who was previously believed to have been created from the Human Torch's body. Vision and Scarlet Witch's children, conceived via Scarlet Witch's hex powers, are revealed to be fragments of the soul of Mephisto. The twins are absorbed back into Mephisto, which temporarily drives the Scarlet Witch insane. Although she eventually recovers, Scarlet Witch and the Vision separate, each operating on a different Avengers team.

Iron Man rejoins, and Quicksilver assists the team when Scarlet Witch aligns herself with their father Magneto. Hank Pym, Wasp, and Quicksilver then leave the team, with Machine Man becoming reservists and Spider-Woman and Living Lightning joining as full-time members. Spider-Man guest-stars in issues #84–86.

Hawkeye assumes his old identity of Goliath, during the crossover storyline "Operation: Galactic Storm", and reconciles with Mockingbird. Iron Man and Wonder Man leave the team, and are replaced by War Machine (Jim Rhodes, one of the founding West Coast Avengers) and Darkhawk, with the latter acting as a reservist. During a battle with the demons Mephisto and Satannish, Mockingbird is killed. Due to constant in-fighting and a general lack of organization, Captain America intervenes and disbands the team. Several members of the West Coast team—including a returned Iron Man—are unhappy about the decision and leave to form another team, called Force Works. This team, however, has several setbacks and quickly disbands, with the members returning to the main Avengers team.

=== Volume 3 (2018 series) ===
During the Fresh Start relaunch, both Hawkeyes – team founder Clint Barton and his successor Kate Bishop – decide to revive the West Coast Avengers following an attack by land sharks in Santa Monica. Clint and Kate recruit America Chavez and Kate's boyfriend Johnny "Fuse" Watts, who helped in the mission, and are eventually joined by Gwenpool and Quentin Quire. Given their lack of funds, the newly formed team attempts to get financiers by starring in a reality show following their exploits. Gwen adopts a baby land shark which she names Jeff – Barton allowing Jeff to stay as long as he does not bite anyone besides supervillains.

=== Volume 4 (2024 series) ===
Iron Man and War Machine later reform the West Coast Avengers as part of a plot to rehabilitate supervillains. With Spider-Woman and ex-criminal Blue Bolt joining the group, they start with Ultron. Firestar later joins the West Coast Avengers in battling the Sovereign Sons. The West Coast Avengers go up against the Gospel of Ultrons, the result of Ultron splitting himself after separating from Hank Pym.

== Other versions ==
An alternate universe iteration of the West Coast Avengers called the West Coast Ultimates appears in the Ultimate Marvel imprint, led by Quake and consisting of Wonder Man, Vision, Black Knight, and Tigra.

== List of creators ==
Years	Name	Role	Issues
Vol. 1 (1984)
1984	Roger Stern	Writer	#1–4
1984	Bob Hall	Penciler	#1–4
Vol. 2 (1985–1994)
1985–1988	Steve Englehart	Writer	#1–29, #31–37, #39, Annual #1–3
1985–1989	Al Milgrom	Penciler	#1–37, #39–40, Annual #2–3
1986	Mark Bright	Writer, penciler	Annual #1
1988	Al Milgrom	Writer	#30
1988	D. G. Chichester	Writer	#38
1988	Margaret Clark	Writer	#38
1989	Mark Gruenwald	Writer	#40
1989	Tom DeFalco	Writer	#41
1989	Ralph Macchio	Writer	#41
1988, 1989, 1990, 1991, 1993	Tom Morgan	Penciler	#38, #41, #58, #71, #100
1989–1990	John Byrne	Writer	#42–57, Annual #4
1989–1990	John Byrne	Penciler	#42–57
1990	Fabian Nicieza	Writer	#58
1990	Danny Fingeroth	Writer	#59
1990	Gary Hartle	Penciler	#59
1990	Brad Vancata	Penciler	#59
1990	Terry Kavanagh	Writer	#64
1990	Chris Wozniak	Penciler	#64
1990–1991	Paul Ryan	Penciler	#60–63, #65–69
1990–1993	Roy Thomas	Writer	#60–63, #65–101, Annual #5–8
1990–1993	Dann Thomas	Writer	#60–63, #65–83, #85–94, #96, Annual #5–7
1991	Steve Butler	Penciler	#70
1991	George Freeman	Penciler	#73
1991, 1992	Herb Trimpe	Penciler	#75, #83
1991–1994	David Ross	Penciler	#71–74, #76–82, #84–95, #98–102
1993	David Ross	Writer	#93, #95
1993	Andrew Currie	Penciler	#96–97
1994	Dan Abnett	Writer	#102
1994	Andy Lanning	Writer	#102
Vol. 3 (2018–2019)
2018–2019	Kelly Thompson	Writer	#1–10
2018–2019	Stefano Caselli	Penciler	#1–4
2019	Daniele Di Nicuolo	Penciler	#5–7
2019	Gang Hyuk Lim	Penciler	#8–9
2019	Moy Rodriguez	Penciler	#10
Vol. 4 (2024–present)
2024–2025	Gerry Duggan	Writer	#1–10
2024–2025	Danny Kim	Penciler	#1–5, 7–10
2025	Ton Lima	Penciler	#6

== Collected editions ==
West Coast Avengers collections
#	Title	Material collected	Publication date	ISBN
Assemble		West Coast Avengers #1–4, Iron Man Annual #7, and The Avengers #250, plus material from The Avengers #239, 243–244, and 246 and Avengers West Coast #100.	June 2010	978-0785143215
Family Ties		West Coast Avengers (vol. 2) #1–9 and Vision and the Scarlet Witch (vol. 2) #1–2.	June 2011	978-0785155003
Sins of the Past		West Coast Avengers (vol. 2) #10–16, West Coast Avengers Annual #1 and The Avengers Annual #15.	December 2011	978-0785159001
Avengers: West Coast Avengers - Lost in Space-Time		West Coast Avengers (vol. 2) #17–24, Fantastic Four #19, and Doctor Strange (vol. 2) #53	April 2012	978-0785162216
Zodiac Attack		West Coast Avengers (vol. 2) #25–30, West Coast Avengers Annual #2 and Avengers Annual #16	July 2012	978-0785162537
Avengers West Coast Visionaries – John Byrne Vol. 1: Vision Quest		West Coast Avengers (vol. 2) #42–47 and Avengers West Coast #48–50.	August 2005	978-0785117742
Avengers West Coast: Vision Quest		West Coast Avengers (vol. 2) #42–46 and Avengers West Coast #47–50.	May 2015	978-0785197409
Avengers West Coast Visionaries – John Byrne Vol. 2: Darker than Scarlet		Avengers West Coast #51–57 and #60–62.	January 2008	978-0785130277
Avengers West Coast: Along Came A Spider-Woman		Avengers West Coast #58–59 and #63–75.	June 2012	978-0785162322
Avengers: Galactic Storm Volume 1		Avengers West Coast #80–81, Captain America #398–399, Quasar #32–33, Wonder Man #7–8, The Avengers #345–346, Iron Man #278, and Thor #445.	March 2006	978-0785120445
Avengers: Galactic Storm Volume 2		Avengers West Coast #82, Iron Man #279, Thor #446, Captain America #400–401, Quasar #34–35, Wonder Man #9, The Avengers #347, and What If? #55–56.	December 2006	978-0785120452
Avengers: Ultron Unbound		Avengers West Coast #89–91, Annual #8 and Vision #1–4.	May 2015	978-0785192695
Avengers: The Death of Mockingbird		Avengers West Coast #92–100, 102; Spider-Woman (vol. 2) #1–4; plus material from Marvel Comics Presents #143–144.	February 2016	978-0785196891
1	Omnibus	West Coast Avengers #1–4; Iron Man Annual #7; The Avengers #250; West Coast Avengers (vol. 2) #1–16; Vision and the Scarlet Witch (vol. 2) #1–2; The Avengers Annual #15; West Coast Avengers Annual #1; material from The Avengers #239, 243–244, 246; material from Avengers West Coast #100	April 2013	978-0785167457
2	Omnibus	West Coast Avengers (vol. 2) #17–41; West Coast Avengers Annual #2–3; Avengers Annual #16; Fantastic Four #19; and Doctor Strange (vol. 2) #53	November 2013	978-0785167471
Avengers by John Byrne Omnibus		West Coast Avengers (vol. 2) #42–46; Avengers West Coast #47–62; Avengers West Coast Annual #4; Avengers #305–318; Avengers Annual #18; and material from Avengers Spotlight #23 and What the--?! #6	July 2016	978-1302900571
Volume 3
1	Best Coast	West Coast Avengers (vol. 3) #1–4, Young Avengers Presents #6, and The Unbelievable Gwenpool #1	February 19, 2019	978-1302913458
2	City of Evils	West Coast Avengers (vol. 3) #5–10	June 1, 2019	978-1302913465
—N/a	Hawkeye: Go West	Hawkeye (vol. 5) #13–16, Generations: Hawkeye & Hawkeye #1, West Coast Avengers (vol. 3) #1–4	March 30, 2021	978-1302923433
—N/a	Hawkeye: Team Spirit	West Coast Avengers (vol. 3) #5–10, War of the Realms: Journey Into Mystery #1–5	March 15, 2022	978-1302934781
—N/a	GwenPool Omnibus	The Unbelievable GwenPool #0–25, West Coast Avengers (vol. 3) #1–10, Superior Spider-Man (vol. 2) #7–8, Gwenpool Strikes Back #1–5, plus extras	December 20, 2022	978-1302948207

=== Epic Collections ===
West Coast Avengers epic collections
#	Title	Material collected	Publication date	ISBN
1	How the West Was Won	West Coast Avengers (1984) #1-4, Iron Man Annual #7, Avengers #250, West Coast Avengers (1985) #1-7, Vision And The Scarlet Witch (1985) #1-2 and Wonder Man (1986) #1	2018	
2	Lost in Space-Time	West Coast Avengers #8-24, Annual #1; Avengers Annual #15	2019	
3	Tales to Astonish	West Coast Avengers #25-37, Annual #2, Avengers Annual #16, Marvel Graphic Novel #27: Emperor Doom	2020	
4	Vision Quest	West Coast Avengers #38-46, Annual #3; Avengers West Coast #47-52, Annual #4; material from Avengers Spotlight #23	2021	
5	Darker than Scarlet	Avengers West Coast #53-64, Annual #5; Avengers #311-313; material from Avengers Annual #19, What The--?! #6	2022	
6	California Screaming	Avengers West Coast #65-82, Annual #6	2023	
7	Ultron Unbound	Avengers West Coast #83-95, Annual #7-8; material from Darkhawk Annual #1 and Iron Man Annual #13	March 2024	

== In other media ==
- The West Coast Avengers appear in Hawkeye's ending in Ultimate Marvel vs. Capcom 3, consisting of himself, Mockingbird, War Machine, Tigra, Wonder Man, and Moon Knight, as well as Capcom characters Jin Saotome, June Lin Milliam, Rikuo, Leo and Rei.
- Rapper Del the Funky Homosapien released a trilogy of mixtapes called West Coast Avengers, though the track listings are unrelated to the comics' group.
