= Howling Commandos of S.H.I.E.L.D. =

2015 comic book series

Group publication information
- Publisher: Marvel Comics
- First appearance: Howling Commandos of S.H.I.E.L.D. #1 (2015)

In-story information
- Type of organization: Team
- Leader(s): S.H.I.E.L.D.

Howling Commandos of S.H.I.E.L.D.

Series publication information
- Schedule: Monthly
- Format: Ongoing series
- Genre: Horror, superhero
- Publication date: 2015
- Number of issues: 6
- Main character(s): Howling Commandos

Howling Commandos of S.H.I.E.L.D. is a comic book series published by Marvel Comics in 2015. The series was a spinoff of the 2014 series S.H.I.E.L.D. by Mark Waid. It lasted for 6 issues.

== Publication history ==
The series was part of All-New All-Different Marvel. The team first appeared in issue six of S.H.I.E.L.D. and picked up after issue nine.

== Plot ==
A new team of Howling Commandos under the command of the S.H.I.E.L.D. subsidiary S.T.A.K.E. led by the rebuilt LMD of Dum Dum Dugan and under the supervision of Warwolf. It consists of Jasper Sitwell's zombie form, Vampire by Night, Man-Thing, Manphibian, Orrgo, Teen Abomination, and Hit-Monkey.

The first mission involved the Earth Idol of Golthana that was being smuggled on the S.S. Chaney and mutated its crew into humanoid plantlike monsters. While the Howling Commandos are successful in defeating the mutated crew members, they merged into one giant plantlike monster. Man-Thing used his touch to burn the giant plantlike monster where its link to the Earth Idol of Golthana caused it to burn as well.

The next mission that S.T.A.K.E gives to the Howling Commandos involves them fighting Sphinx and Adversary which led to them getting Glyph on their team.

During the Avengers: Standoff! storyline, Paul Kraye caught Orrgo going through some S.T.A.K.E. files and informed Maria Hill enough for Orrgo to be sent to Pleasant Hill. The rest of the Howling Commandos rescued Orrgo and were teleported back to S.T.A.K.E. HQ by Kobik where they found that Paul Kraye had released every monstrous inmate there. This caused the Howling Commandos to spring into action.

== Reception ==
The series holds an average rating of 5.6 by 17 professional critics on the review aggregation website Comic Book Roundup.

Doug Zawisza of CBR.com stated that the book is a fun introduction to a new concept, but wrestles a little bit to find its identity.

== Prints ==
=== Issues ===
No.	Title	Cover date	Comic Book Roundup rating	Estimated sales (first month)	Rated
#1	"Mission 001: Earth Idol"	December 2015	5.5 by fourteen professional critics.	44,532, ranked 46th in North America	T
#2	"Mission 002: Ghost Train"	January 2016	—N/a	20,498, ranked 119th in North America	—N/a
#3	—N/a	February 2016	—N/a	18,002, ranked 144th in North America	—N/a
#4	—N/a	March 2016	4.3 by one professional critic.	14,091, ranked 154th in North America	—N/a
#5	—N/a	April 2016	—N/a	12,281, ranked 163th in North America	—N/a
#6		May 2016	7.0 by two professional critic.	12,700, ranked 153th in North America	—N/a

== Collected editions ==
Title	Material collected	Publication date	ISBN	Estimated sales (first month)
Howling Commandos of S.H.I.E.L.D.: Monster Squad	Howling Commandos of S.H.I.E.L.D. #1-6	May 25, 2016	978-0785196464	838, ranked 142nd in North America

== See also ==
- 2015 in comics
- Nick Fury's Howling Commandos
