= Fin Fang Foom =

Marvel Comics fictional character

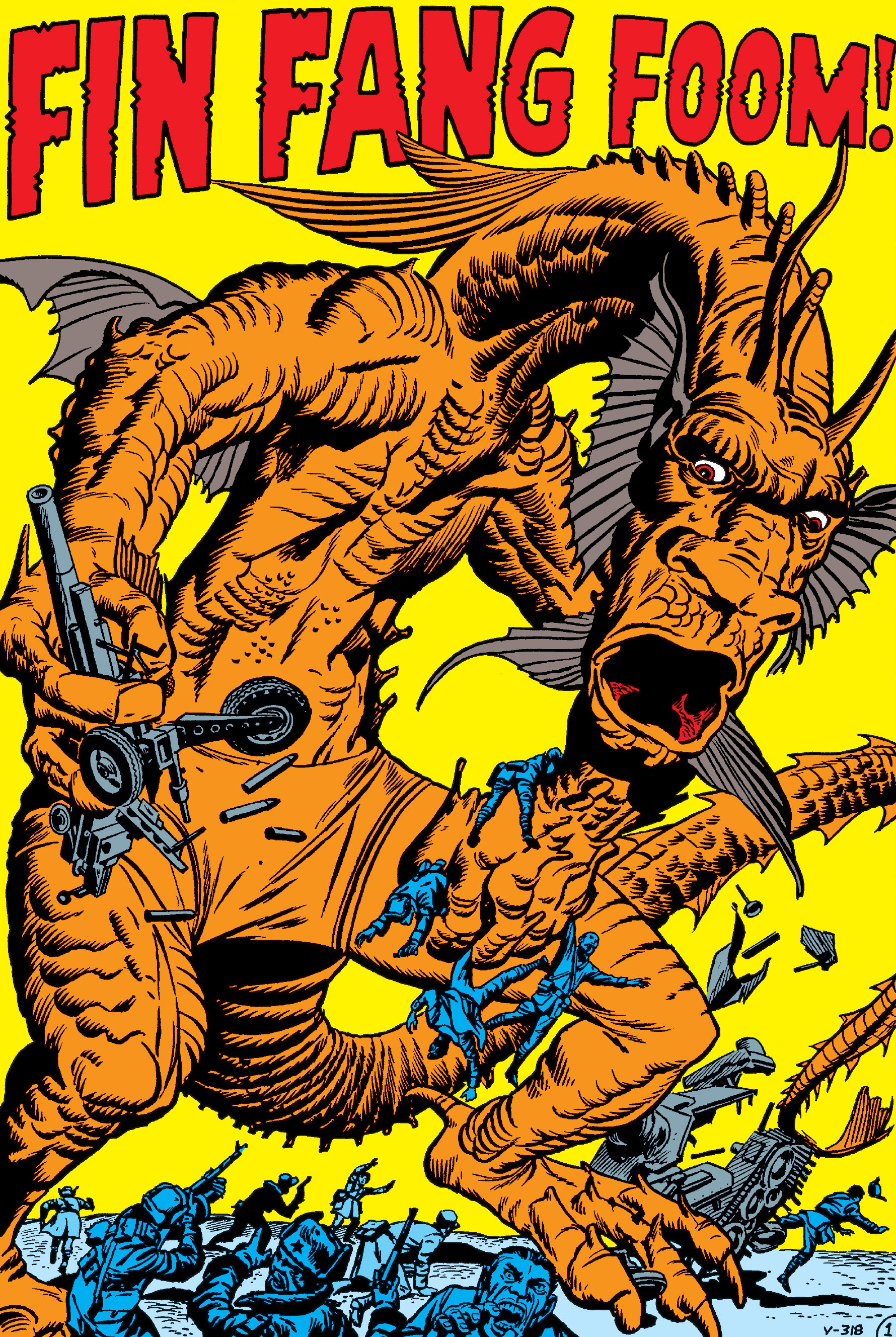
- Fin Fang Foom as depicted in Strange Tales #89 (October 1961). Art by Jack Kirby.

Publication information
- Publisher: Marvel Comics
- First appearance: Strange Tales #89 (October 1961)
- Created by: Stan Lee (writer); Jack Kirby (artist)

In-story information
- Species: Makluan/Axonn-Karr
- Team affiliations: Dragon Lords of Kakaranathara; Fin Fang Four; Beyond Reason Spiritual Fellowship; Lethal Legion
- Notable aliases: "He Whose Limbs Shatter Mountains and Whose Back Scrapes the Sun"
- Abilities: Superhuman strength Supersonic flight via wings Extreme durability Regenerative healing factor Acid mist breath Telepathy; Prolonged lifespan Shapeshifting; Size alteration Gifted intellect Possesses advanced alien technology

Fin Fang Foom is a character appearing in American comic books published by Marvel Comics. The character has been depicted as an extraterrestrial creature resembling a dragon. The character first appeared in Strange Tales #89 (cover-dated Oct. 1961), and was created by Stan Lee and Jack Kirby. Later, the character became part of the superhero Iron Man's rogues' gallery.

The character has also appeared in associated Marvel merchandise including animated television series, toys, trading cards, and video games. IGN's List of Top 100 Comic Book Villains of All Time ranked Fin Fang Foom #99.

== Publication history ==
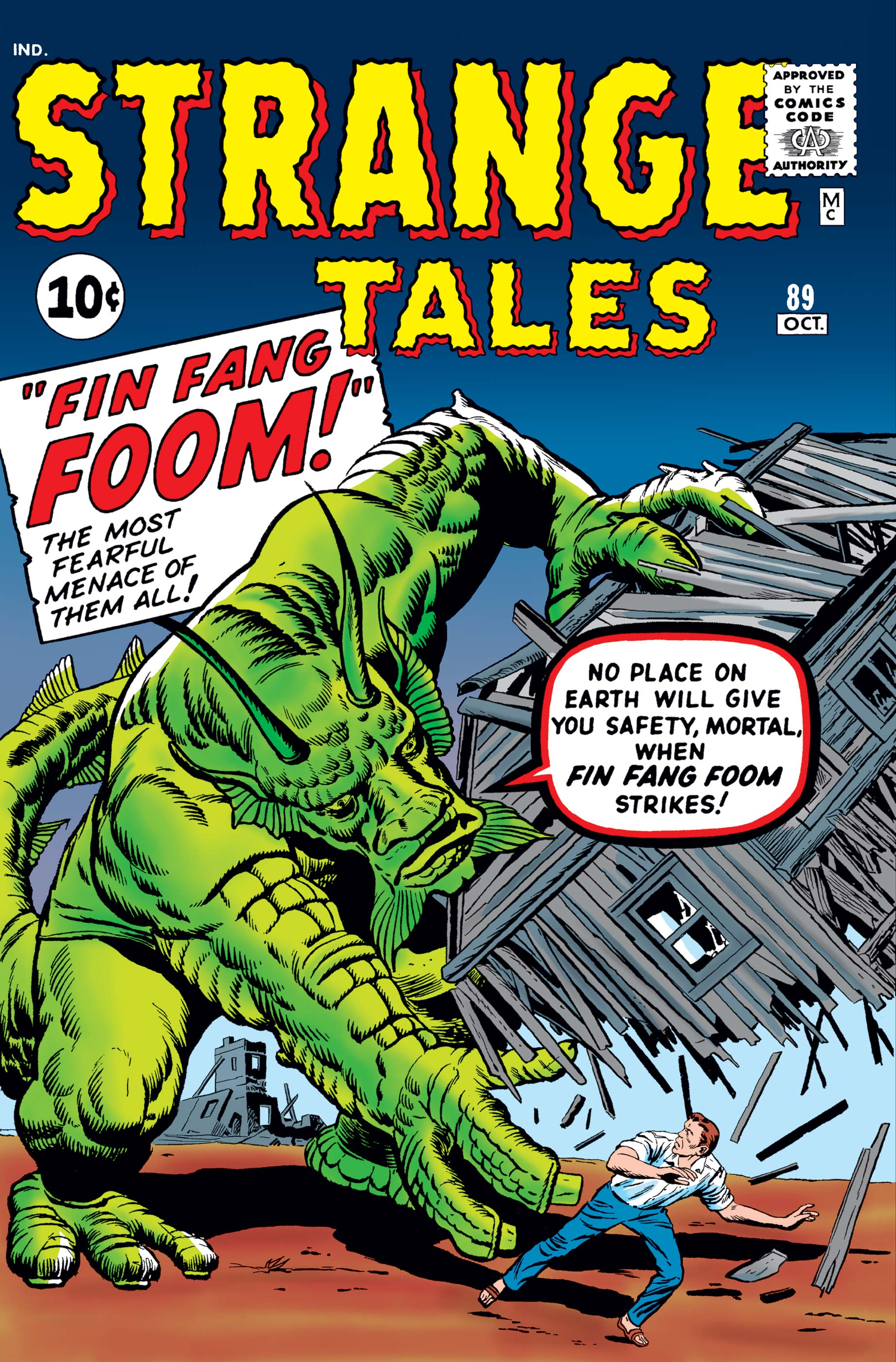
The character makes his debut on the cover of Strange Tales #89 (Oct. 1961). Art by Jack Kirby.

Fin Fang Foom was created by Jack Kirby. Debuting in Strange Tales #89 (October 1961) during the Silver Age of Comic Books, Fin Fang Foom appeared during Marvel Comics' "pre-superhero" period, which would not become integrated into Marvel's mainstream fictional continuity until the 1970s.

Writer-editor Stan Lee's inspiration for the character's name was the title of the 1934 film version of the long-running British stage musical Chu Chin Chow. As Lee described in 2005:

When I was a kid, I loved going to the movies. When I say a kid, I mean 10, 11, 12 years old. And there was one movie I'd seen. I remember nothing about it except the name. It took place in China, I believe, and the name of the movie was Chu Chin Chow. Now I have no idea what it meant — I don't know if it was somebody's name or a country or a city, but I never forgot that name. Those three words just stuck in my memory: Chu Chin Chow. So when I was looking for the name of a monster, I remember Chu Chin Chow... and that particular meter, that beat, somehow led to Fin Fang Foom. (transcript of 2005 interview)

The character first appeared in the standalone story "Fin Fang Foom" in Strange Tales #89 (October 1961) where a Nationalist Chinese scholar Chan Liuchow awakened Fin Fang Foom and tricked him into destroying a Communist Chinese invasion force of Taiwan. Fin Fang Foom reappeared in Astonishing Tales #23-24 (April and June 1974) where he battled It! The Living Colossus. He was impersonated by the Midgard Serpent in Thor #379 (May 1987). His first story was reprinted in Fantasy Masterpieces #2 (April 1966), Where Monsters Dwell #21 (May 1973) and Marvel Monsterworks (1990). Foom, as well as his opponent, Chan Liuchow, eventually reappeared in Marvel continuity in Legion of Night #1-2 (October 1991), and then made multiple appearances in Iron Man #261-264 (October 1990 - January 1991); 267 (April 1991) and 270–275 (July-December 1992), and returned in Iron Man (vol. 3) #15-18 (April–July 1999).

An alternate version appears in Mutant X Annual 2001. Foom briefly appeared in the intercompany crossover JLA/Avengers #1 (September 2003). The villain Nightmare transformed one of the Mindless Ones into a copy of Foom to battle the Hulk in Hulk (vol. 3) #79 (May 2005).

The character's origins and early days are developed in Marvel Monsters: Monsters On The Prowl #1 (December 2005) and Fin Fang Four #1 (December 2005). Foom also appeared in Nextwave #1-2 (March–April 2006), Marvel Holiday Special 2006 (January 2007), in a dream in Howard the Duck (vol. 3) #1 (November 2007), in Iron Man: Las Vegas (May-June 2008); and appeared briefly in the limited series Age of the Sentry #1-6 (September 2008-May 2009); one-shot titles Monster-Size Hulk #1 (December 2008) and Dark Reign Files #1 (April 2009) and featured in another monster one-shot title, Fin Fang Four Return! (July 2009). An alternate universe version of Fin Fang Foom appeared in Hulk: Broken Worlds #2 (July 2009).

== Fictional character biography ==
Fin Fang Foom is a Makluan, a dragon-like alien from the planet Kakaranathara (also known as Maklu IV) in the Greater Magellanic Cloud. The aliens arrive on Earth in China near the end of its ancient period, intending to conquer Earth. Because of them, the Chinese dragons symbolize potent and auspicious powers in culture, allowing monarchs, especially emperors, to claim the banner "Sons of Heaven" since King Wen of the Zhou dynasty. In time, during the Qin dynasty, their presences signal the beginning of the country's imperial periods. Using their shapeshifting powers to mimic human form, the aliens infiltrate human society to study it before beginning their conquest. Foom, the navigator, is the exception and, acting as a reserve, is placed in a tomb in a catatonic state.

In the 1960s, Fin Fang Foom is awakened by scholar Chan Liuchow, whose home country of Taiwan is under threat from invading forces of Communist China. Liuchow goads Foom into destroying the Communist invasion force before returning him to his hibernation through the use of a rare herb.

Fin Fang Foom is awakened and returned to hibernation on two occasions before being freed by the Mandarin. Foom helps the Mandarin take control of one-third of China and is reunited with his former teammate, who had been masquerading as a human named Chen Hsu. When the two begin to summon the rest of their crew, who had been disguised as humans for centuries, the Mandarin realizes that he has been tricked. He joins forces with heroes Iron Man and War Machine to defeat the Makluans, who are apparently killed.

Although Fin Fang Foom's body is destroyed, his spirit survives and bonds itself to a dragon statue, which was stolen from a curio shop by teenager Billy Yuan at Foom's mental urging. Using Yuan's body as a conduit for his power, Foom summons thousands of lizards and fuses them with Yuan's body to recreate his own body. Iron Man defeats Foom with assistance from the remnants of Yuan's mind. Foom is then taken to Monster Isle.

Fin Fang Foom is captured by the Elder of the Universe known as the Collector, and imprisoned with a subterranean collection of monsters. After being rescued by the Fantastic Four, Fin Fang Foom decides to reform and becomes a follower of Buddhism. Entering into a rehabilitation program with Elektro, Gorgilla, and Googam, Foom is shrunken to the size of a human, stripped of his powers, and allowed to enter human society. Foom becomes the head chef of a Chinese restaurant within the Baxter Building.

During the "Monsters Unleashed" storyline, Fin Fang Foom, Gorgilla, the Green Thing, and Zzutak confront Kei Kawade in the forest outside his house and warns Kei against the preceding monster summoning. Foom is among the monsters summoned by Kei to help combat the Leviathons. Following the Leviathon Mother's death, Foom and the other Goliathons confront Kei. Kei thanks the Goliathons for their help in fending off the Leviathons, but Foom warns him about summoning them again.

An alternate universe version of Fin Fang Foom, corrupted by a symbiote and serving the Poisons, manipulates Kei Kawade and attempts to make him help the symbiote hive enter his universe. The prime universe Foom convinces Kei that their adversary had been using its own mental abilities to undermine Kei's strength of will, allowing Kei to overcome the alternate Foom's influence and defeat him.

== Powers and abilities ==
Fin Fang Foom possesses super-strength and endurance, the abilities to fly via his wings at supersonic speeds and spew combustible acid mist from his mouth. Foom is also extremely durable and can regenerate at a rapid rate. In the event his body were to be damaged beyond his capacity to heal, he can overshadow a waiting host and reshape a new physical body for himself from them. By entering into long periods of hibernation, Foom has managed to survive for centuries. Foom possesses a gifted intellect and can communicate telepathically, shapeshift into almost any animal, and shrink to human size. Foom also has access to advanced alien technology from his homeworld. Foom can also drain, metabolize and redirect energy of all kinds to make himself larger and stronger. At one time, Foom underwent intense meditative training in order to excise himself of his negative traits. The end result of divesting his rage, guilt and selfishness caused him to shrink yet gave rise to his malignant aspects in physical form. Fin Fang Foom also has the unique power to cause transmogrification through optic beam emissions, having not only changed and rewired the persona's of the Avengers to mimic that of their animal forms. Foom's transmutation allows him to bring inanimate objects to life at his discretion.

== Other versions ==
=== Iron Man: Las Vegas ===
Fin Fang Foom as depicted in Iron Man (2008). Art by Adi Granov.

An alternate universe version of Fin Fang Foom from Earth-80734 appears in Iron Man: Viva Las Vegas.

=== Marvel 1602 ===
An alternate universe version of Fin Fang Foom from Earth-311 appears in Marvel 1602.

=== Mutant X ===
An alternate universe version of Fin Fang Foom from Earth-1298 appears in Mutant X Annual 2001. This version is a member of the Lethal Legion who is later killed by the Goblin Queen.

=== Nextwave ===
A clone of Fin Fang Foom from Earth-63163 created by the Beyond Corporation appears in Nextwave. Consistent with the original depiction by Kirby, Fin Fang Foom is shown wearing underpants.

=== Stig's Inferno ===
Fin Fang Foom appears in Stig's Inferno #4.

=== Thor: The Mighty Avenger ===
An alternate universe version of Heimdall from Earth-10091 who can transform into Fin Fang Foom appears in Thor: The Mighty Avenger #6.

== In other media ==
=== Television ===
- Fin Fang Foom appears in Iron Man (1994), voiced by Neil Ross. He initially serves the Mandarin before eventually betraying him to reunite with his fellow dragons. However, they are later killed following a battle with Iron Man and Force Works.
- Fin Fang Foom appears in the Iron Man: Armored Adventures two-part episode "Tales of Suspense". This version was created by the original Mandarin to guard one of his Makluan rings and test potential successors.
- Fin Fang Foom appears in The Super Hero Squad Show, voiced by Steve Blum. This version is a member of Doctor Doom's Lethal Legion.
- Fin Fang Foom appears in the Ultimate Spider-Man episode "The Avenging Spider-Man".
- Fin Fang Foom appears in the Avengers Assemble episode "The New Guy".
- Fin Fang Foom appears in the Hulk and the Agents of S.M.A.S.H. episode "Mission Impossible Man". This version is incapable of speech.
- Fin Fang Foom appears in the Guardians of the Galaxy episode "One in a Million You". This version is an endling who was captured by the Collector before being freed by the eponymous Guardians of the Galaxy and released on another planet.
- Fin Fang Foom appears in Marvel Disk Wars: The Avengers, voiced by Keiji Hirai in the original Japanese version.
- Fin Fang Foom appears in the M.O.D.O.K. episode "If This Be... M.O.D.O.K.!" This version runs a restaurant called "Fin Fang Farm to Table".

=== Film ===
- Fin Fang Foom appears in The Invincible Iron Man as the Mandarin's guardian before Iron Man kills him.
- Fin Fang Foom serves as inspiration for films set in the Marvel Cinematic Universe (MCU).
  - An image of the character appears in Iron Man (2008), created by artist Adi Granov based on Fin Fang Foom's depiction in the Iron Man: Viva Las Vegas comic book miniseries.
  - A heroic dragon from Ta-Lo inspired by Fin Fang Foom called the Great Protector appears in Shang-Chi and the Legend of the Ten Rings (2021).

=== Video games ===
- Fin Fang Foom appears as a boss in Marvel: Ultimate Alliance, voiced by James Sie. This version is a member of Doctor Doom's Masters of Evil.
- Fin Fang Foom makes a cameo appearance in Sir Arthur's ending in Marvel vs. Capcom 3: Fate of Two Worlds.
- Fin Fang Foom appears in Marvel Super Hero Squad Online.
- Fin Fang Foom appears as an unlockable playable character in Lego Marvel's Avengers, voiced by Patrick Seitz.
- Fin Fang Foom appears as a boss in Marvel Avengers Academy.
- Fin Fang Foom appears as an unlockable playable character in Lego Marvel Super Heroes 2, voiced by Pedro Lloyd Gardiner.
- Fin Fang Foom appears as a boss in Marvel's Guardians of the Galaxy. This version is found on his home planet before being confronted and captured by the Guardians of the Galaxy, intended as a gift for Lady Hellbender.
