= Nick Fury's Howling Commandos =

Comic book series published by Marvel Comics

- Promotional art for premiere-issue cover by Eduardo Francisco

Group publication information
- Publisher: Marvel Comics
- First appearance: Nick Fury's Howling Commandos #1 (December 2005)
- Created by: Keith Giffen

In-story information
- Type of organization: Team
- Leader(s): S.H.I.E.L.D.
- Agent(s): Abominable Snowman; Frank; Glob; Gorgolla; Gorilla-Man; Grogg; The Living Mummy; Vampire by Night; Warwolf; Werewolf by Night; Zombie

Nick Fury's Howling Commandos

Series publication information
- Schedule: Monthly
- Format: Ongoing series
- Genre: Horror, superhero
- Publication date: December 2005 – May 2006
- Number of issues: 6

Creative team
- Writer(s): Keith Giffen
- Penciller(s): Eduardo Francisco
- Inker(s): Kris Justice; Terry Pallot; Robert Campanella
- Letterer(s): Dave Lanphear
- Colorist(s): J. Tai
- Creator(s): Keith Giffen

Nick Fury's Howling Commandos was an American comic book series published by Marvel Comics. Running six issues before its cancellation and cover-dated December 2005 to May 2006, the series featured a fictional team set in the Marvel Universe, consisting of supernatural characters employed as a unit of the espionage agency S.H.I.E.L.D.

The title is a play on that of Marvel's World War II-based series Sgt. Fury and his Howling Commandos. Although Marvel superspy hero Nick Fury is the title character, he only appeared in a cameo in the first issue.

The group's official name was never established in the series' six issues, but was called the S.H.I.E.L.D. Paranormal Containment Unit in its single other appearance, in Blade vol. 3, #1 (Nov. 2006). The same issue established its nickname as the Howling Commandos.

Marvel returned to the concept in 2015 with Howling Commandos of S.H.I.E.L.D., a series canceled after six issues where that version featured a spiritual successor to the team that is established by S.H.I.E.L.D. subsidiary S.T.A.K.E.

== Publication history ==
Written by Keith Giffen for its entire run, the series was launched with penciller Eduardo Francisco for its first two issues, followed by Dan Norton for issues #3, Derec Aucoin for #4-5 and Mike Norton for #6.

== Plot synopsis ==
A powerful magician claiming to be the one true Merlin (one of many characters in the Marvel Universe to make this claim) escapes from a S.H.I.E.L.D. containment facility dubbed the Warehouse. He journeys to the United Kingdom where he transforms the entire country into a fantasy realm. The Howling Commandos are charged with stopping him.

The team is headquartered in Area 13, a classified base run by S.H.I.E.L.D. for its supernatural black op program. It also serves as a research and development facility, specializing in the supernatural.

== Characters ==
Some of the characters, including Brother Voodoo and Gorilla-Man, were pre-existing human characters from Marvel's superhero and supernatural comics. Others, such as Goom, Grogg and Groot, were monsters from pre-superhero Marvel science fiction/fantasy anthology comics of the late 1950s and early 1960s. Others were newly created or new versions of existing characters.

The seven primary characters are:

- Frank - Frank is an intelligent clone of the original Frankenstein's Monster. He has super strength and durability, as well as a healing factor.
- Gorilla-Man (Kenneth Hale) - Hale is a man trapped in a gorilla's body, granting him superhuman strength, stamina and dexterity as well as immortality. He is a member of the Agents of Atlas.
- The Living Mummy (N'Kantu) - N'Kantu is a human who is injected with a fluid causing him to be immortal, although he resembles a rotting corpse. He has super strength and durability.
- Clay Quartermain - Quartermain is the commanding officer of Area 13. He takes over in the first issue from Dum Dum Dugan. He is later killed by Doc Samson when he discovers Red Hulk's identity.
- Vampire by Night (Nina Price) - Price is a hybrid of a vampire and a werewolf.
- Warwolf (Vince Marcus) - Marcus is the field leader. He is a werewolf who can shapeshift voluntarily whenever Mars is in the night sky.
- Zombie (John Doe) - Doe is depicted as having normal human-level intelligence, in contrast to other zombie characters in the Marvel universe.

The main antagonists are:

- Merlin - Merlin is one of many magicians in the Marvel universe claiming to be the true Merlin.
- Tilesti of the Folk is a Faerie and Merlin's second-in-command.

Supporting characters include:

- Bradley Beemer - Beemer is Area 13's Tech Chief and in charge of research and development.
- Brother Voodoo (Jericho Drumm) - Drumm is a master of voodoo magic. He is later killed when the Eye of Agamotto is destroyed.
- Glob (Joseph "Joe" Timms) - Timms is a swamp monster that has superhuman strength, stamina and durability.
- Grogg - Grogg is a winged dragon that can shoot flames from his nostrils. He is used as the team's transportation.
- Groot - Groot is a sentient tree. He has super strength and durability and he is able to animate and control plant life. He later became a member of the Guardians of the Galaxy.
- Hellstorm (Daimon Hellstrom) - Hellstorm has mystical powers due to being a human-demon hybrid. He is currently a member of HYDRA's Department of Occult Armaments and is one of the Hell-Lords.
- Lilith - Lilith is the daughter of Dracula and possesses vampire powers. However, she is immune to sunlight and can not be permanently killed while her father is alive.
- Buzz McMahon - McMahon is a S.H.I.E.L.D. agent that pilots Grogg.
- Werewolf by Night (Jacob Russoff/Jack Russell) - Russell's lycanthropy gives him superhuman speed, strength and agility as well as sharpened senses and a healing factor. He only appears in issue #1, the Director's Cut.

Other characters include:

- Abominable Snowman - This Abominable Snowman is described as the actual folkloric Abominable Snowman and not specifically connected to the other versions of the Abominable Snowman that were seen in Marvel Comics.
- Dragoom - Dragoom is an alien who has a plasma form and the ability to control fire. He joins the team in issue #6.
- Goom - Goom is an alien from Planet X first appearing in "pre-superhero Marvel". He is seen briefly at the beginning of issue #3.
- Gorgolla - Gorgolla's body is made of living granite, giving him super strength and near-invulnerability. He also has wings that allow him to fly.
- It the Living Colossus - It is a living statue, capable of flight and is nearly invulnerable.
- Manphibian - Manphibian is a member of an amphibious race, with superhuman strength and razor-sharp claws.
- Joshua Pryce - Pryce has magical abilities. He joins the team in issue #6.
- Sasquatch - This Sasquatch is described in issue #2 as the actual folkloric Sasquatch and not specifically connected to the superhero Sasquatch of Alpha Flight vol. 1 or to the race of Sasquatches revealed in the series Alpha Flight vol. 2.

== In other media ==
=== Television ===
- Nick Fury's Howling Commandos appear in the Ultimate Spider-Man two-part episode "Blade and the Howling Commandos", consisting of Frankenstein's Monster, Werewolf by Night, N'Kantu, the Living Mummy, the Man-Thing, and a minor original character called Max the Invisible Man. Additionally, Blade was originally a member of the team before he left for unknown reasons.
- Nick Fury's Howling Commandos appear in Hulk and the Agents of S.M.A.S.H., consisting of Blade, Frankenstein's Monster, Werewolf by Night, N'Kantu the Living Mummy, and the Man-Thing.

=== Film ===
Nick Fury's Howling Commandos appear in Hulk: Where Monsters Dwell, consisting of Martin Reyna / Warwolf, the Man-Thing, a zombified Jasper Sitwell, Nina Price / Vampire by Night, and Benito Serrano / Minotaur.

== See also ==
- Creature Commandos, a similar team from DC Comics
- 2005 in comics
