= It! The Living Colossus =

- It! The Living Colossus was featured in his own short-lived miniseries starting with Astonishing Tales #21 (Dec. 1973)

Publication information
- Publisher: Marvel Comics
- First appearance: Tales of Suspense #14 (Feb. 1961)
- Created by: Jack Kirby

In-story information
- Species: Stone humanoid
- Team affiliations: Howling Commandos (formerly)
- Partnerships: Bob O'Bryan
- Abilities: Superhuman strength, stamina, and durability; Flight; Underwater adaptation

It! The Living Colossus is a fictional character appearing in American comic books published by Marvel Comics. Initially a statue animated by a hostile extraterrestrial, he first appeared in the science-fiction anthology series Tales of Suspense #14 (Feb. 1961), in a story drawn by Jack Kirby (writer unknown). He was revived in Astonishing Tales #21 (Dec. 1973) by writer Jenny Blake Isabella and artist Dick Ayers as the protagonist of a short-lived feature, in which he was animated by a wheelchair-using special-effects designer.

== Publication history ==
It! The Living Colossus debuted in the 18-page science fiction story "I Created the Colossus" in the anthology series Tales of Suspense #14 (Feb. 1961), published by Marvel Comics' 1950s and early 1960s forerunner, Atlas Comics. Penciled by industry legend Jack Kirby and inked by Dick Ayers, and scripted by an uncredited writer, this "Marvel pre-superhero" monster returned for a 13-page sequel story, "Colossus Lives Again", by the same artistic team, in the by-now Marvel comic Tales of Suspense #20 (Aug. 1961). The two stories were reprinted in, respectively, Monsters on the Prowl #17 (June 1972) and 25 (Sept. 1973).

The character was revived in Astonishing Tales #21 (Dec. 1973) by writer Jenny Blake Isabella and artist Dick Ayers, who both drew and lettered the stories. The feature ran four issues, through #24 (June 1974).

Isabella said in 2001 that after the Theodore Sturgeon story "It!" in Supernatural Thrillers #1 (Dec. 1972) had sold well, "Came the word from on high that Marvel should do a regular 'It!' series". Marvel already had an It-like swamp monster in the Man-Thing, so, "looking over the sales figures for recent issues of Marvel's giant monster reprint books, we discovered the issues which reprinted the 'Colossus' stories by Jack Kirby [Monsters on the Prowl #17 and 25] sold much better than the other issues which had been published around the same time".

In 2009, Isabella elaborated, saying editor-in-chief Roy Thomas:

...wanted to give me a series to write and knew I was a monster-movie fan. He asked for my input on our new 'It', and that's when I learned [the "Colossus" sales information]. I pitched him on the new 'It' being a continuation of those stories, though in my original pitch, the special effects-man hero of the second Colossus story had married his actress sweetheart and already started a family with her. Any member of the family would have been able to activate and control the Colossus. Roy steered me to the more dramatic premise of the hero being paralyzed.

Assessing the series, Isabella said, "It was an honor working with Dick Ayers, one of the original 'Big Four' artists of the Marvel Universe. However, I don't think Dick was at his best here. He wasn't being treated very well by Marvel and it was showing in his work".

In an unusual storytelling technique for the time, Isabella made longer stories than the budgeted 15-page tales by inserting reprint panels or pages from 1959-61 pre-superhero monster stories. "I could expand the page count of the 'It!' stories while including backstory which would have otherwise eaten up some of those new pages".

Had the series continued, Isabella said in 2009, "subsequent stories would have featured Goom and Googam ... and a team-up with [the superhero] Thor to stop an invasion of Earth by the Storm Giants of Norse legend".

The character was killed in The Incredible Hulk vol. 2 #244 (Feb. 1980), a fill-in issue, though it was rebuilt in another story the following decade. Writer Steven Grant recalled:

[Editor] Al Milgrom suggested It, mainly because he'd already enlisted Carmine [Infantino] to draw the story, and we both very fondly remembered all the superhero and sci-fi stories Carmine drew at DC in the ’50s and ’60s featuring giants, with an emphasis on giant feet. ... So Al suggested using It, Marvel's most expendable giant character of the day. No longer sure which of us decided it was time to grind him into dust-Dust-DUST, but I do remember that was an intentional friendly rib at Jim Shooter's Korvac storyline in Avengers.

== Fictional character biography ==
It! the Living Colossus was a 100-foot-tall stone humanoid statue constructed by Moscow sculptor Boris Petrovski to protest the oppressive Soviet Union government. It became animated initially by the mind transferal of a stranded alien from the Kigor race, and rampaged through Moscow. When the alien's rescue party arrived, the Kigors abandoned the Colossus and returned to their homeworld, leaving the statue inanimate. The statue was later transported to Los Angeles, California and reanimated by the Kigors, who used it to attack the U.S. Army. The Kigors were defeated by Hollywood special effects designer Bob O'Bryan and the statue was again rendered inanimate.

An accident later robbed O'Bryan of the use of his legs, compelling him to use a wheelchair. The statue was stolen by the evil Doctor Vault, who reduced its size from 100 feet (30 m) to 30 feet (9.1 m). Animated by the mind transferal of O'Bryan, It! battled Vault's minions and escaped. It! went on to battle other monster foes. O'Bryan later was cured and married Diane Cummings. The statue became controlled by Doctor Vault and was destroyed in battle with the Hulk. Doctor Vault died when he was unable to complete the transference of his mind from the statue back into his body, it was rebuilt as a robot for use by O'Bryan in his films. Later, the original It! was reconstituted by O'Bryan under the control of Lotus Newmark.

After a battle with Doctor Doom, It! was lost in the Pacific Ocean near the Galápagos Islands. O'Bryan lost his connection to both his normal body and It! and his body was left in a vegetative state. Five years later, Deadpool assisted O'Bryan's niece in retrieving the Colossus and restoring O'Bryan's mind.

O'Bryan and It! were being considered as a "potential recruit" for the Initiative program.

It! later appeared on Monster Isle when Shadowcat and Magik appeared to look for a mutant girl named Bo.

== Powers and abilities ==
Bob O'Bryan becomes It! through mind transferal into an animated stone statue and its composition had been altered by the Kigors. It has tremendous strength, stamina, and durability, as well as the ability to fly via gravity manipulation. As a statue, It! can survive underwater without air. However, it is vulnerable to nerve or knockout gas, which forces the command intelligence back into its original body.

"Special psychokinetic nerve endings" implanted by the Kigors allow It! to be animated, either directly (as with those aliens) or by psychic transference (as with O'Bryan).

== Other versions ==
Reed Richards made a duplicate of It! using the "Ionic Inanimate Matter Converter". It was sent to oppose the Cosmic Cube-empowered Doctor Doom.

Another duplicate of It!, as well as a second brown version of the creature, fought on behalf of the terrorist front organization H.A.T.E., defending the secret State 51 installation from Nextwave.

== Reception ==
It! The Living Colossus was ranked #27 on a listing of Marvel Comics' monster characters in 2015.
