= S.H.I.E.L.D. (2014 series) =

- S.H.I.E.L.D. #1

Publication information
- Publisher: Marvel Comics
- Schedule: Monthly
- Genre: Spy, superhero
- Publication date: December 2014 – January 2016
- No. of issues: 12

Creative team
- Written by: Mark Waid
- Penciller(s): Michael 'Mike' Choi; Alan Davis; Carlos Pacheco; Humberto Ramos; Paul Renaud; Chris Sprouse; Greg Smallwood
- Inker(s): Michael 'Mike' Choi; Mark Farmer; Victor Olazaba - 'Vinktor'; Jason Paz; Paul Renaud; Karl C. Story; Mariano Taibo; Greg Smallwood
- Letterer: Joe Caramagna
- Colorist(s): Edgar Delgado - 'Pato'; Romulo Fajardo Jr. Rachelle Rosenberg; Dono Sánchez-Almara; Matthew 'Matt' Wilson
- Editor(s): Tom Brevoort; Ellie Pyle; Jon Moisan; Axel Alonso

S.H.I.E.L.D. is a comic book series published by Marvel Comics, premiering with a first issue cover dated 2014. It was written by Mark Waid. The series was loosely based on the TV series Agents of S.H.I.E.L.D. and was used by Marvel Comics to introduce many characters from the show into the world of the comics. After its cancellation it was followed by the series Agents of S.H.I.E.L.D. The series also had a spin-off named Howling Commandos of S.H.I.E.L.D. which picked up after issue 9.

== Publication history ==
The series was published from December 2014 to January 2016 and was part of All-New Marvel NOW! The first issue had eleven variant covers.

The series features the first comics appearance of the following characters and teams:

Agent Melinda May
Agent Leo Fitz
Agent Jemma Simmons
Agent Billis
Grayson Blair
Mr. Simmons
Skeesh
Colonel Myrdden
Athol Kussar
Ethan Slaughter
Horguun
Agent Jeremiah Warrick
All-New Howling Commandos (Note: Consisting of Zombie (Simon Garth), Living Mummy (N'Kantu), Man-Thing (Theodore Sallis) and Frankenstein's Monster.)
Detective Nicole Orr
D.E.A.T.H.

Issue 9 of the series (named "The Man Called D.E.A.T.H.") was an extra large special issue and part of series of one-shots to commemorate the 50th anniversary of the creation of S.H.I.E.L.D. by Stan Lee and Jack Kirby in 1965. The story includes a sequence pencilled by Jack Kirby and inked by Jim Steranko that had never seen print as part of a series before. The issue also features backup stories named "Dugan Lives" and "Nick Fury, Agent of S.H.I.E.L.D.: The Man for the Job", the former is part of the prelude to the Howling Commandos series that follow this series and the second is a reprinting of the first ever S.H.I.E.L.D. story from issue 135 of Strange Tales in 1965.

== Plot ==
Each separate issue is mostly a one-and-done story, with some connections between them but the series functions mostly as an anthology series.

== Reception ==
The series holds an average rating of 7.9 by 72 professional critics according to review aggregation website Comic Book Roundup.

Jesse Schedeen of IGN stated that the series may not appeal much to the fans who are craving an old school type Nick Fury, Agent of S.H.I.E.L.D. revival, but the first issue does a fine job of drawing elements from the TV series and merging them with the traditional Marvel Comics universe. Meagan Damore of expressed that the first issue focused too much on the character of Phil Coulson and that while he was very well written that could not be said for the other characters. She also said that the first issue does a good job of establishing the team dynamic, albeit lightly, in a fun and memorable way. Michael Maillaro of InsidePulse stated that he enjoyed the fact that story is a complete done-in-one per issue. He also enjoyed the fact that Phil Coulson in his opinion got more characterization in the first issue than he had ever been given before in comics where he is usually portrayed as Nick Fury Jr's sidekick. Jideobi Odunze of GeekedOutNation expressed that if one is a fan of the TV show or Coulson the series is worth picking up.

== Prints ==
=== Issues ===
Number	Title	Cover date	Comic Book Roundup rating	Estimated sales (first month)
#1	Active Mission: Perfect Bullets	February 2015	7.5 by 27 professional critics.	94,503, ranked third in North America
#2	Active Mission: The Animator	March 2015	7.2 by 13 professional critics.	33,965, ranked 50th in North America
#3	Active Mission: Home Invasion	April 2015	6.7 by seven professional critics.	29,790, ranked 71st in North America
#4	Active Mission: Fuel	June 2015	8.2 by four professional critics.	26,930, ranked 109th in North America
#5	Active Mission: Magic Bullets	June 2015	8.1 by four professional critics.	26,614, ranked 113th in North America
#6	Active Mission: Dark Dimensions	July 2015	9.0 by two professional critics.	
#7	Active Mission: The Strange Case of Daisy Johnson and Mr. Hyde	August 2015	8.4 by two professional critics.	
#8	Active Mission: No Angel	September 2015	7.8 by three professional critics.	
#9	Active Mission: The Man Called D.E.A.T.H.	October 2015	7.6 by three professional critics.	
#10	Active Mission: The Duck Called H.O.W.A.R.D.	November 2015	8.3 by five professional critics.	
#11	Active Mission: Fortune's Favor	December 2015	8.2 by two professional critics.	
#12	Active Mission: Kingslayer	January 2016	—N/a	

== Collected editions ==
Title [Tagline]	Material collected	Publication date	ISBN
S.H.I.E.L.D Vol.1: Perfect Bullets	S.H.I.E.L.D. #1-6	July 1, 2015	978-0785193623
S.H.I.E.L.D Vol.2: The Man Called D.E.A.T.H.	S.H.I.E.L.D. #7-12	January 27, 2016	978-0785193630

== See also ==
- 2014 in comics
