= Manphibian =

- The Manphibian makes his first appearance (standing in between the Frankenstein's Monster and Count Dracula). From The Legion of Monsters #1

Publication information
- Publisher: Marvel Comics
- First appearance: Legion of Monsters #1 (Sept. 1975)
- Created by: Marv Wolfman; Jenny Blake Isabella; Dave Cockrum; Sam Grainger

In-story information
- Species: Unknown extraterrestrial piscine/amphibian humanoid
- Team affiliations: S.H.I.E.L.D. Howling Commandos; Legion of Monsters; Avengers of Supernatural; S.T.A.K.E.
- Abilities: Amphibious breathing Healing factor Longevity; Superhuman strength Sharp claws and fangs Tough skin

Manphibian is a fictional character appearing in American comic books published by Marvel Comics. He has some resemblance to the "Gill Man" seen in Creature from the Black Lagoon.

== Publication history ==
Manphibian first appeared in Legion of Monsters #1 and was created by Marv Wolfman, Jenny Blake Isabella, Dave Cockrum, and Sam Grainger.

== Fictional character biography ==
Manphibian belongs to an amphibious alien species. Thousands of years prior, his mate was murdered by another of his species, violating a long-standing policy of non-violence among them. After his elders denied him revenge, Manphibian pursued the murderer into space, which eventually led him to Earth. Many years later, oil drillers inadvertently awaken the murderer, who Manphibian stops from attacking civilian Beth Fox. Beth is traumatized by the experience, leading her husband Aaron Fox to vow revenge and begin hunting Manphibian.

Manphibian and his mate had multiple offspring who were simultaneously trapped on Earth. Due to the death of his mate, Manphibian is forced to raise his children on his own.

At some point, Manphibian is recruited by S.H.I.E.L.D. to join Nick Fury's Howling Commandos.

When the Monster Special Force begins hunting down and killing any being they deemed a monster, Manphibian joins up with the Legion of Monsters to battle them. The Legion of Monsters leads the survivors to the abandoned Morlock tunnels beneath Manhattan, converting it into Monster Metropolis. However, Manphibian's children are unable to join him in Monster Metropolis due to there being a limited supply of water.

Manphibian is one of several beings who are captured by Mojo to appear in one of Mojo's films. He is paired up with Blade, Doctor Strange, Ghost Rider, Man-Thing, and Satana as the Avengers of the Supernatural.

In All-New, All-Different Marvel, Manphibian appears as a member of S.T.A.K.E.'s Howling Commandos.

== Powers and abilities ==
Manphibian is amphibious and can breathe in and out of water. He possesses superhuman strength and can tear a fifteen-foot tree from the ground. He has sharp claws and extremely durable skin, able to protect him from most conventional weapons. He can heal rapidly and has an extended lifespan.

== Reception ==
The Manphibian was ranked #28 on a listing of Marvel Comics' monster characters in 2015.
