= Teen Abomination =

Marvel comics character

- Teen Abomination as depicted in Superior Iron Man #1 (January 2015). Art by Yıldıray Çınar (penciller/inker) and Clayton Cowles (letterer).

Publication information
- Publisher: Marvel Comics
- First appearance: Superior Iron Man #1 (January 2015)
- Created by: Tom Taylor; Yıldıray Çınar

In-story information
- Alter ego: Jamie Carlson
- Species: Human gamma-mutate
- Team affiliations: Champions; Young Avengers; Howling Commandos; S.T.A.K.E.
- Abilities: Superhuman strength, stamina, durability, and speed; Regeneration; Underwater breathing

Teen Abomination (Jamie Carlson) is a fictional character appearing in American comic books published by Marvel Comics. He is a teenage counterpart of the Abomination and the son of Happy Hogan.

== Publication history ==
Teen Abomination first appeared in Superior Iron Man #1, and was created by writer Tom Taylor and artist Yıldıray Çınar. He was originally created as a joke character and named "Teen Man-Thing". When editor Mark Paniccia told Taylor to write a flashback issue for the fifth issue of Superior Iron Man, he decided to tell the backstory of Teen Abomination. He described the character as "a young kid, bullied at school for being outside the mainstream, who was already feeling a bit uncomfortable in his own skin, who becomes trapped in far worse skin".

== Fictional character biography ==
Jamie Carlson is the son of Stark Industries scientist Katrina Carlson. When he was five years old, Jamie got sick and his mother Katrina had to take him to her job at Stark Industries due to being unable to find a babysitter. On the same day, a test of gamma-powered equipment occurred. During the test, the device malfunctioned and exploded. The accident led to Katrina being fired. Unbeknownst to anybody, Jamie had been exposed to gamma radiation.

When he is thirteen, Jamie is bullied by other teenagers and his skateboard ends up being broken. He returns to his house, where his mother tries to console him. However, her attempts frustrate Jamie, who transforms into a creature resembling the villain Abomination as an effect of the gamma radiation. The physical damage to the house he caused after transforming causes an explosion that apparently kills Katrina.

Jamie attempts to use the Extremis virus to cure his condition. Unable to do so, he embarks on a rampage, calling himself "Teen Abomination" to attract Tony Stark's attention. Teen Abomination is imprisoned, but later breaks free and travels to Stark Island searching for Iron Man. Stark confronts him, but soon Teen Abomination demands Stark to listen to him. After being asked what did he want, Teen Abomination replied that he had tried Extremis, but it did not work on him. Jamie starts living in Stark Island in secrecy, where Stark attempts to treat him. The results of Stark's investigation lead to the discovery that Jamie's father had been Happy Hogan.

When Pepper Potts and a digital backup of Tony Stark's mind try to help the real Stark return to his regular self, they take Jamie into their custody. When Iron Man confronts Pepper and his digital self, Jamie sides with Pepper. Stark revealed to Jamie that he had recently discovered his mother was not dead, but had suffered severe head trauma and was recovering at a hospital. In response, Jamie returns to his human form.

Jamie is later taken in by an unidentified person or organization that fused an electronic chip into his skull, forcing him into becoming a mindless machine for destruction. He is later unleashed to wreak havoc at the Oakland Airport and is confronted by S.T.A.K.E. operatives Martin Reyna, Jasper Sitwell, and Dum Dum Dugan. Dugan detects the chip inside Jamie's body and tells Sitwell to shoot a bullet into his skull, destroying the chip and neutralizing him. S.T.A.K.E. takes Jamie in to help him recover, eventually recruiting him into the organization.

== Powers and abilities ==
Teen Abomination has all the powers of Emil Blonsky, but to a lesser extent.
