= Goom =

Fictional extraterrestrial in Marvel Comics

- Goom's first appearance in Tales of Suspense #15. Art by Jack Kirby.

Publication information
- Publisher: Marvel Comics
- First appearance: Tales of Suspense #15 (March 1961)
- Created by: Stan Lee; Jack Kirby; Dick Ayers

In-story information
- Team affiliations: S.H.I.E.L.D. S.H.I.E.L.D.'s Paranormal Containment Unit
- Abilities: Mental powers Immense head Arsenal of advanced technology

Goom is a fictional extraterrestrial created by Stan Lee, Jack Kirby, and Dick Ayers, appearing in American comic books published by Marvel Comics. He first appeared in the anthology comic book Tales of Suspense #15 (March 1961) during the Silver Age of Comic Books. He is depicted as the father of Googam.

== Publication history ==
Goom first appeared in Tales of Suspense #15 and was created by Stan Lee, Jack Kirby, and Dick Ayers.

== Fictional character biography ==
Goom is an alien who originates from Planet X, a planetoid in the Solar System that is concealed by distortions in space. After astronaut Mark Langley sends a signal to Planet X, Goom follows it to Earth and attempts to conquer the planet before being stopped by other aliens that came from Planet X. Googam, his son, soon followed his footsteps.

Xemnu later created a duplicate of Goom which the Hulk destroyed.

At some point, the alien Collector captured Goom and imprisoned him with other monsters. The Mole Man freed these captives, but they were stopped by Beast, Giant-Man, Hulk and Thing, and then Mister Fantastic transported them to the Negative Zone.

Goom and the other monsters eventually returned to Earth where they went to live on Monster Isle. One time on a Valentine's Day, Goom searched for a human mate, until the goddess Venus arranged for him to be somewhat unwillingly set up to date the alien Shivoor. Goom disappeared afterwards, and his son Googam was left alone on Earth.

The microscopic Tim Boo Ba manipulated Googam as he searched for Goom, so that Goom would bring Tim Boo Ba to Earth, although the "Fin Fang Four" helped Googam defeat Tim.

S.H.I.E.L.D. later captured Goom and placed him in custody of the Howling Commandos Monster Force. Goom later appeared on Monster Isle when Shadowcat and Magik appeared to look for a mutant girl named Bo. Goom was one of the monsters that attacked the three until Magik teleported herself, Shadowcat, and Bo to the Jean Grey School for Higher Learning.

During the Monsters Unleashed storyline, Goom is among the monsters summoned by the Inhuman Kei Kawade to fight the Leviathon Tide. In one of these battles, Goom mocks Googam for struggling in his battle against an Insectoid Leviathon.

== Powers and abilities ==
Goom has an immense head that grants him advanced intelligence and psychic powers. He wields various technology, including a spaceship, a disintegration-inducing "Neutron Ray", and an age-manipulating time machine. Due to Earth's lower gravity, he is also able to fly.

== Other versions ==
In the Marvel Adventures continuity, Goom is depicted as an alien from the Negative Zone who monitors Earth through television transmissions. He later becomes obsessed with 2000s rap culture after the Human Torch accidentally switches his feed to MTV.

== In other media ==
- Goom makes a non-speaking cameo appearance in The Super Hero Squad Show episode "This Man-Thing, This Monster! (Six Against Infinity, Part 3)".
- Goom appears in Hulk and the Agents of S.M.A.S.H., with vocal effects provided by Dee Bradley Baker. The version is female, lacks mental powers, and can breathe fire, ice, and acid.
