= Vampire by Night =

Publication information
- Publisher: Marvel Comics
- First appearance: Amazing Fantasy vol. 2 #10 (September 2005)
- Created by: Jeff Parker; Federica Manfredi

In-story information
- Alter ego: Nina Price
- Species: Vampire/werewolf hybrid
- Team affiliations: S.H.I.E.L.D.'s Paranormal Containment Unit; S.T.A.K.E.
- Abilities: Immortality; Superhuman strength Superhuman speed Superhuman agility Superhuman endurance Superhuman senses Night vision Healing factor Hypnosis; Shapeshifting (wolf and bat)

The Vampire by Night (Nina Price) is a fictional character that appears in comic books published by Marvel Comics. She is the niece of Jack Russell and has the ability to shapeshift into either a werewolf or a vampiress between dusk and dawn.

== Publication history ==
Vampire by Night first appeared in Amazing Fantasy vol. 2 #10 (September 2005) and was created by writer Jeff Parker and artist Federica Manfredi.

== Fictional character biography ==
Nina Price is the niece of Jack Russell / Werewolf by Night and inherited a long-running familial curse that originated when her ancestor Grigori was corrupted by the Darkhold and bitten by a werewolf who served Dracula. At some point, Nina was attacked and bitten by a vampire, transforming her into a hybrid. As a result, she transforms into a vampire during the night and a white wolf during a full moon. Nina uses her father's money and status to create a special area to cage herself and prevent herself from harming others. She willingly uses her abilities to kill criminals and satiate her bloodthirst. After being captured by S.H.I.E.L.D., Nina joined S.H.I.E.L.D.'s Paranormal Containment Unit, nicknamed the Howling Commandos. She is partnered with fellow werewolf Warwolf (Vince Marcus) and fellow vampire Lilith, the daughter of Dracula.

In the All-New, All-Different Marvel publication line, Nina joined S.T.A.K.E.'s Howling Commandos.

Nina ended up under the thrall of Dracula when Old Man Logan and the Howling Commandos arrived to rescue Jubilee, who is also being controlled by Dracula. Both of them were freed from Dracula's control upon his defeat.

== Powers and abilities ==
Nina is a hybrid of a vampire and a werewolf and possesses the abilities of both, but only after sunset. Her vampire powers give her superhuman physical abilities, a healing factor, and the ability to hypnotize others with her gaze. Due to her hybrid nature, sunlight is not lethal to Nina as it is to most vampires.

She is also cursed with the power of lycanthropy. When the moon is full, she transforms into a white wolf resembling an Arctic wolf. In her bestial state, Nina possesses the enhanced physical abilities and senses of a wolf.

== Reception ==
In 2021, Screen Rant included Nina Price in their "Marvel: 10 Most Powerful Vampires" list.

== In other media ==
- The Vampire by Night appears in Hulk: Where Monsters Dwell, voiced by Chiara Zanni. This version is a member of the Howling Commandos.
- The Vampire by Night appears as an unlockable playable character in Marvel Avengers Academy.
