= Hulk: Where Monsters Dwell =

- Directed by: Mitch Schauer
- Written by: Marty Isenberg; Dave McDermott
- Based on: Hulk by Stan Lee and Jack Kirby
- Starring: Fred Tatasciore; Jesse Burch; Liam O'Brien; Matthew Waterson
- Music by: Michael McCuistion; Kristopher Carter; Lolita Ritmanis
- Production company: Marvel Animation
- Distributed by: Walt Disney Studios Home Entertainment
- Release date: October 21, 2016
- Running time: 75 minutes
- Country: United States
- Language: English

Hulk: Where Monsters Dwell is a 2016 American direct-to-streaming animated superhero film featuring the superhero character Hulk. The movie takes its name from a 1970s Marvel comic book title. The film is set within the same continuity as Avengers Assemble and Ultimate Spider-Man. It is the second film in the Marvel Animated Universe after Marvel Super Hero Adventures: Frost Fight!.

== Plot ==
Doctor Strange brings Hulk to New York City to assist fighting rampaging monsters on Halloween night, which were young teens stuck dreaming and changed into the monsters that they fear. During battle, Hulk randomly reverts to an unconscious Bruce Banner. Doctor Strange planned a trip to the Dream Dimension with the Hulk to get to the bottom of the monsters while confronting Nightmare. Before this happens, they call upon the S.H.I.E.L.D.'s Paranormal Containment Unit (consisting of Jasper Sitwell's zombie form, Man-Thing, Vampire by Night / Nina Price, and Warwolf) to watch over their physical forms and contain the rampaging monsters. Banner and Hulk split for their trip to the other dimension with Banner using the dream version of Iron Man's Hulkbuster armor.

Meanwhile, Hulk and the captive monsters escape from the Sanctum, and the Paranormal Containment Unit pursues them. In the other dimension, Strange is captured by Nightmare after Hulk joins him and opens the portal to the real world. This turns out to be a strategic plan by Hulk and Banner to free Benito Serrano and the young teenagers, Ana, Eric, and Gayle, by facing their fears and managing to escape. However, Serrano is trapped in the monstrous appearance of a Minotaur by Nightmare. Upon escaping the dimension, Nightmare begins to invoke more fear in the New York residents, Hulk, Strange and the Paranormal Containment Unit enter the battle and with Serrano now a member of the team, they manage to defeat Nightmare sending him back to the dimension.

In the end, Hulk decides to name the Paranormal Containment Unit as the Howling Commandos and they enter Strange's Sanctum until they wait for a S.H.I.E.L.D. plane.

== Cast ==
- Jesse Burch as Bruce Banner, Waiter
- Fred Tatasciore as Hulk, Countdown
- Liam O'Brien as Stephen Strange / Doctor Strange
- Matthew Waterson as Nightmare
- Edward Bosco as Vince Marcus / Warwolf, Minotaur, Reveler
- Jon Olson as Dr. Theodore "Ted" Sallis / Man-Thing, Rorgg, Sporr, Zzutak
- Michael Robles as Benito Serrano
- Mike Vaughn as Jasper Sitwell
- Zach Callison as Eric, Kid Dressed as Ninja
- Hope Levy as Gayle, Kid Dressed as Pirate, Kid Dressed as Princess
- Laura Bailey as Ana, Kid Dressed as Vampire, Kid Dressed as Football Player
- Chiara Zanni as Nina Price / Vampire by Night, Bee Girl, Nurse

== Production ==
The film is produced by Marvel Animation. Jamie Simone serves as the casting and voice director.

== Release ==
Hulk: Where Monsters Dwell was first announced and had its world premiere at the 2016 San Diego Comic-Con. The film was released on Digital HD on October 21, 2016. In 2017, it was released on Netflix. In 2022, it left the streaming service. The film later became available to stream on Disney+.

== Reception ==
Joe Garza of /Film stated, "While this is primarily a Hulk flick, the inclusion of Doctor Strange and the haunted heroes of the Howling Commandos makes Hulk: Where Monsters Dwell an absolute blast." Gab Hernandez of Screen Rant included Hulk: Where Monsters Dwell in their "8 Best Adaptations of Doctor Strange In Movies and TV" list, writing, "While the movie is definitely more of a fun monster mash than a strong narrative, that's totally fine for a comic book movie meant for kids."

Johnny Brayson of Bustle ranked Hulk: Where Monsters Dwell 10th in their "19 Best Animated Movies On Netflix Right Now" list. Ben Silverio of ScienceFiction.com gave Hulk: Where Monsters Dwell a grade of 3.5 out of 5 and called it a "solid Halloween cartoon overall," saying, " It's a lot of fun and action-packed, while being a bit edgier than what's on TV so as to give older fans just as much reason to check it out with or without their little True Believers."
