= Glob (comics) =

Marvel Comics fictional character

- The Glob makes his first appearance. From The Incredible Hulk (vol. 2) #121

Publication information
- Publisher: Marvel Comics
- First appearance: (Timms): The Incredible Hulk (vol. 2) #121 (November 1969) (Beckwith): The Incredible Hulk (vol. 2) #389 (January 1992)
- Created by: (Timms): Roy Thomas; Herb Trimpe (Beckwith): Tom Field; Gary Barker

In-story information
- Alter ego: Joseph Timms; Sumner Samuel Beckwith
- Species: Human mutate
- Team affiliations: (Timms): S.H.I.E.L.D. Paranormal Containment Unit (Beckwith): Pantheon
- Notable aliases: (Timms): The Golden Brain
- Abilities: (Both): Superhuman strength, stamina, and durability; (As the Golden Brain): Psionic powers; (As Beckwith): Expert geneticist; (As the Glob): Bog manipulation

The Glob is the name of several characters appearing in American comic books published by Marvel Comics.

== Publication history ==
The first Glob debuted in The Incredible Hulk (vol. 2) #121 (November 1969), and was created by Roy Thomas and Herb Trimpe. Roy Thomas has stated that the character was a conscious imitation of the Heap. Thomas intended to call the character the Shape, but editor Stan Lee thought that name sounded too feminine, and insisted on the name "the Glob".

The second Glob debuted in The Incredible Hulk (vol. 2) #389 (January 1992), and was created by Tom Field and Gary Barker.

== Fictional character biography ==
=== Joseph "Joe" Timms ===
Joe Timms is a petty criminal who escapes from prison to see his dying wife, only to drown in a swamp bog. After the Hulk throws nuclear waste into the bog, Timms is revived as the Glob, a slimy monster with immense strength, but little intelligence. The Glob battles Hulk before being dissolved by an experimental anti-radiation fluid. Shortly thereafter, the Leader resurrects Glob for a second battle against the Hulk, only for him to be destroyed in an explosion.

The Glob's brain later reforms into the Golden Brain. Yagzan and the Cult of Entropy use it as a weapon, but lose by the Entropists in an encounter with the Man-Thing. The Golden Brain psionically molds itself into an amnesiac blond-haired man. The man is captured and mutated by Yagzan into a clay-based lifeform similar to the Glob. It battles the Man-Thing, reducing itself to mud again, which suffocates Yagzan to death.

It is later revealed that Glob had been enslaved by the Collector. It eventually rebels against him with the assistance of the Hulk and the Man-Thing. The Glob is later taken into S.H.I.E.L.D. custody and joins the Paranormal Containment Unit.

=== Sumner Samuel Beckwith ===
Sumner Samuel Beckwith is a geneticist working for the Pantheon who creates an experimental duplicate of the Super-Soldier Serum after discovering the journals of Ted Sallis, who became Man-Thing due to his own research in recreating the formula. The serum turns out to be defective and transforms Beckwith into a creature made of bog matter known as the Glob. It flees to the Florida Everglades and battles the Hulk, who mistakes it for the original Glob. Glob is incinerated by the Man-Thing's touch after feeling fear.

== Powers and abilities ==
Both the Globs are monstrous creatures resembling a semi-solid mass of vegetable matter, with inhuman strength, stamina, and durability, though limited in brainpower and athletics. The Globs' bodies are difficult to harm, because their muddy exteriors can absorb physical attacks painlessly.

Joe Timms became the first Glob as a result from exposure to toxic waste in the swamp. As the Golden Brain, it can materialize an electrically-charged duplicate of its Glob form and recreate a physically perfect human body for itself.

Sumner Beckwith became the second Glob when he injected himself with a duplicate version of the Super-Soldier Formula. Unlike the original, it could excrete slime-like material from its own body to smother living beings or regenerate lost limbs. He earned a Ph.D. in genetics, before his transformation.

== Other characters named Glob ==
There have been three other characters known as Glob in the Marvel Universe. These include:

- The Glob, an imaginary flaming monster from Strange Tales #88.
- The Glop, who was originally known as the Glob in Journey into Mystery #72.
- Glob Herman, a student at the Xavier Institute.

== Reception ==
The Glob was ranked #31 on a listing of Marvel Comics' monster characters.
