= Astonishing Tales =

Comic book series published by Marvel Comics

- Astonishing Tales #1 (Aug. 1970), cover art by Marie Severin and Bill Everett.

Publication information
- Publisher: Marvel Comics
- Schedule: Bimonthly
- Format: Ongoing series
- Genre: Superhero
- Publication date: (Volume 1); August 1970 – July 1976 (Volume 2); April 2009 – September 2009
- No. of issues: (Volume 1) 36 (Volume 2) 6
- Editor(s): Stan Lee; Roy Thomas

Collected editions
- Essential Super-Villain Team-Up, Volume 1: ISBN 0-7851-1545-5

Astonishing Tales is an American anthology comic book series originally published by Marvel Comics from 1970 to 1976. Its sister publication was Amazing Adventures (vol. 2).

In 2008 and 2009, Marvel produced 11 webcomics starring different characters under the umbrella title Astonishing Tales. Several stories were reprinted in the six-issue miniseries Astonishing Tales (vol. 2) (April–Sept. 2009).

== Publication history ==
=== Ka-Zar and Doctor Doom ===
Astonishing Tales began as a split title with solo features starring the jungle lord Ka-Zar and the supervillain and monarch Doctor Doom in 10–page stories each. The latter feature was dropped after issue #8 (Oct. 1971). The creative team of "Doctor Doom" was initially composed of writer Roy Thomas and penciler-inker Wally Wood, a veteran of 1950s EC Comics stories and one of the early, signature artists of Daredevil. Wood remained as artist through issue #4 (Feb. 1971), succeeded by penciler George Tuska for two issues and Gene Colan for the final two. Larry Lieber was writer for issues #3–6, succeeded by Gerry Conway.

"Ka-Zar" was initially by the longstanding and highly influential team of writer and Marvel editor-in-chief Stan Lee and penciler and co-plotter Jack Kirby, the duo who had introduced the jungle lord years before as a one-issue supporting character in The X-Men. Ka-Zar had since guest-starred in Daredevil and in other series before gaining his first solo feature here. After that initial story, Roy Thomas scripted the second installment, with the team of writer Gerry Conway and penciler Barry Windsor-Smith taking over for issues #3–6. Thomas and signature Hulk artist Herb Trimpe teamed for the next two issues, with Thomas abetted by Mike Friedrich on the latter. Astonishing Tales then starred Ka-Zar solely in stories ranging from 16 to 21 pages each.

A variety of creative teams followed, with Lee, Thomas, Conway and Len Wein individually writing or collaborating on stories before Mike Friedrich became regular writer with issue #14 (Dec. 1972). Pencilers included Dan Adkins, Rich Buckler, Gil Kane, and John Buscema, plus a Buscema-Neal Adams collaboration on one issue. The feature ended with issue #20 (Oct. 1973).

Barbara "Bobbi" Morse first appeared in the Ka-Zar story in Astonishing Tales #6 (June 1971) and would later become the superheroine Mockingbird. Joshua Link was introduced in Astonishing Tales #8 and later became the supervillain Gemini of Zodiac. Issues #12 and #13 introduced the Man-Thing to color comics, as a Ka-Zar antagonist. Issue #14 featured a censored color reprint of the black-and-white Ka-Zar tale in the comics magazine Savage Tales #1 (May 1971). Two issues contained back-up-feature reprints of 1950s jungle stories from Marvel predecessor Atlas Comics: two stories from Lorna the Jungle Girl #14 (July 1955) in Astonishing Tales #9, and a Jann of the Jungle story from Jungle Tales #2 (Nov. 1954), in Astonishing Tales #14.

=== It! and Deathlok ===
Astonishing Tales #25 (Aug. 1974). Cover art by Rich Buckler and Klaus Janson.

Astonishing Tales #21–24 (Dec. 1973–June 1974) featured "It! The Living Colossus", starring a stone giant introduced in an anthological science fiction-monster story in Tales of Suspense #14 (Feb. 1961), with a sequel in issue #20 (Aug. 1961). Tony Isabella and Dick Ayers comprised the modern feature's writer-artist team.

The final feature in Astonishing Tales starred and introduced Deathlok, a conflicted cyborg who predated the popular film character RoboCop by several years. At least two major iterations of the character, featuring different individuals, starred in series in the 1990s and 2000s. Created by artist Rich Buckler, who devised the initial concept, and writer Doug Moench, the feature ran from #25–28 and 30–36 (Aug. 1974 – Feb. 1975 and June 1975 – July 1976), the final issue. Bill Mantlo scripted issues #32–35, with Buckler himself scripting the finale. Buckler described Deathlok as "an extension of a paranoid fantasy. He was a representation of part of my outlook and world view. He was a culmination of many of the messages in some of the music of the time. He was part of some of the things going wrong in our country at the time. Maybe he was the science that was going wrong". Artist George Pérez made his professional comics debut with a two-page backup feature in issue #25.

The last two issues were released in both a 25-cent and a 30-cent edition. Issue #29 (April 1975) was a fill-in that reprinted an edited version of the first Guardians of the Galaxy story, from Marvel Super-Heroes #18 (Jan. 1969).

In addition to the sister publication of Astonishing Tales, Amazing Adventures (vol. 2), Marvel announced plans in 1970 for a never-realized third split book featuring Doctor Strange and the Iceman.

=== Table of issues ===
Issue	A Story	B Story	C Story
1	Ka-Zar Collected in Marvel Masterworks: Ka-Zar Volume 1	Dr. Doom Collected in Doctor Doom: The Book of Doom Omnibus; Marvel Masterworks Marvel Rarities Vol. 1; Doctor Doom Epic Collection Vol. 2: Revolution In Latveria	
2	Ka-Zar Collected in Marvel Masterworks: Ka-Zar Volume 1	Dr. Doom Collected in Doctor Doom: The Book of Doom Omnibus; Marvel Masterworks Marvel Rarities Vol. 1; Doctor Doom Epic Collection Vol. 2: Revolution In Latveria	
3	Ka-Zar Collected in Marvel Masterworks: Ka-Zar Volume 1	Dr. Doom Collected in Doctor Doom: The Book of Doom Omnibus; Marvel Masterworks Atlas Era: Heroes Vol. 1; Marvel Masterworks Marvel Rarities Vol. 1; Doctor Doom Epic Collection Vol. 2: Revolution In Latveria	
4	Ka-Zar Collected in Marvel Masterworks: Ka-Zar Volume 1	Dr. Doom and Red Skull and his Exiles (Marvel Comics)/Other versions Collected in Marvel Masterworks Atlas Era: Heroes Vol. 1; Marvel Masterworks Marvel Rarities Vol. 1; Doctor Doom Epic Collection Vol. 2: Revolution In Latveria	
5	Ka-Zar Collected in Marvel Masterworks: Ka-Zar Volume 1	Dr. Doom and Red Skull and his Exiles (Marvel Comics)/Other versions Collected in Marvel Masterworks Atlas Era: Heroes Vol. 1; Marvel Masterworks Marvel Rarities Vol. 1; Doctor Doom Epic Collection Vol. 2: Revolution In Latveria	
6	Ka-Zar Collected in Marvel Masterworks: Ka-Zar Volume 1	Dr. Doom and Black Panther Collected in Doctor Doom: The Book of Doom Omnibus; Black Panther: The Early Years Omnibus; Marvel Masterworks Marvel Rarities Vol. 1; Mighty Marvel Masterworks: The Black Panther Vol. 2 - Look Homeward, Avenger; Doctor Doom Epic Collection Vol. 2: Revolution In Latveria	
7	Ka-Zar Collected in Marvel Masterworks: Ka-Zar Volume 1	Dr. Doom and Black Panther Collected in Doctor Doom: The Book of Doom Omnibus; Black Panther: The Early Years Omnibus; Marvel Masterworks Marvel Rarities Vol. 1; Mighty Marvel Masterworks: The Black Panther Vol. 2 - Look Homeward, Avenger; Doctor Doom Epic Collection Vol. 2: Revolution In Latveria	
8	Ka-Zar Collected in Marvel Masterworks: Ka-Zar Volume 1	Dr. Doom Collected in Doctor Doom: The Book of Doom Omnibus; Doctor Doom Epic Collection Vol. 2: Revolution In Latveria	
9	Ka-Zar Collected in Marvel Masterworks: Ka-Zar Volume 1	Dr. Doom Collected in Doctor Doom: The Book of Doom Omnibus	
10	Ka-Zar Collected in Marvel Masterworks: Ka-Zar Volume 1	Dr. Doom Collected in Doctor Doom: The Book of Doom Omnibus	
11	Ka-Zar Collected in Marvel Masterworks: Ka-Zar Volume 1	Lorna, the Jungle Girl Reprinted from Lorna, The Jungle Girl #14; Collected in Marvel Masterworks: Atlas Era Jungle Adventure Volume 3	Lorna, the Jungle Girl Reprinted from Lorna, The Jungle Girl #14; Collected in Marvel Masterworks: Atlas Era Jungle Adventure Volume 3
12	Ka-Zar and Man-Thing Collected in Marvel Masterworks: Ka-Zar Volume 1; Marvel Masterworks: The Man-Thing Vol. 1; Man-Thing Omnibus		
13	Ka-Zar and Man-Thing Collected in Marvel Masterworks: Ka-Zar Volume 1; Marvel Masterworks: The Man-Thing Vol. 1; Man-Thing Omnibus		
14	Ka-Zar Reprint of the fifth story in Savage Tales #1 Collected in Marvel Masterworks: Ka-Zar Volume 1	Jann of the Jungle Reprinted from Jungle Tales #2; Collected in Marvel Masterworks: Atlas Era Jungle Adventure Volume 2	
15	Ka-Zar Collected in Marvel Masterworks: Ka-Zar Volume 1		
16	Ka-Zar Collected in Marvel Masterworks: Ka-Zar Volume 1		
17	Ka-Zar Collected in Marvel Masterworks: Ka-Zar Volume 2		
18	Ka-Zar Collected in Marvel Masterworks: Ka-Zar Volume 2		
19	Ka-Zar Collected in Marvel Masterworks: Ka-Zar Volume 2		
20	Ka-Zar Collected in Marvel Masterworks: Ka-Zar Volume 2		
21	It! The Living Colossus	Death Reprint of Amazing Adult Fantasy #9	
22	It! The Living Colossus		
23	It! The Living Colossus		
24	It! The Living Colossus		
25	Deathlok The Demolisher Collected in Marvel Masterworks: Deathlok Volume 1; Deathlok the Demolisher: The Complete Collection		
26	Deathlok The Demolisher Collected in Marvel Masterworks: Deathlok Volume 1; Deathlok the Demolisher: The Complete Collection		
27	Deathlok The Demolisher Collected in Marvel Masterworks: Deathlok Volume 1; Deathlok the Demolisher: The Complete Collection		
28	Deathlok The Demolisher Collected in Marvel Masterworks: Deathlok Volume 1; Deathlok the Demolisher: The Complete Collection		
29	Guardians of the Galaxy Reprint of the 1st story from Marvel Super-Heroes #18		
30	Deathlok The Demolisher Collected in Marvel Masterworks: Deathlok Volume 1; Deathlok the Demolisher: The Complete Collection		
31	Deathlok The Demolisher Collected in Marvel Masterworks: Deathlok Volume 1; Deathlok the Demolisher: The Complete Collection	Silver Surfer Reprint of the 1st story from Silver Surfer #3	
32	Deathlok The Demolisher Collected in Marvel Masterworks: Deathlok Volume 1; Deathlok the Demolisher: The Complete Collection		
33	Deathlok The Demolisher Collected in Marvel Masterworks: Deathlok Volume 1; Deathlok the Demolisher: The Complete Collection		
34	Deathlok The Demolisher Collected in Marvel Masterworks: Deathlok Volume 1; Deathlok the Demolisher: The Complete Collection		
35	Deathlok The Demolisher Collected in Marvel Masterworks: Deathlok Volume 1; Deathlok the Demolisher: The Complete Collection		
36	Deathlok The Demolisher Collected in Marvel Masterworks: Deathlok Volume 1; Deathlok the Demolisher: The Complete Collection		

=== Volume 2 ===
In 2008 and 2009, Marvel produced 11 webcomics starring different characters under the umbrella title Astonishing Tales:

- Astonishing Tales: Daredevil (2009)
- Astonishing Tales: Dominic Fortune (2009)
- Astonishing Tales: Iron Man (2008)
- Astonishing Tales: Iron Man 2020 (2008–2009)
- Astonishing Tales: M.O.D.O.K. (2009)
- Astonishing Tales: Mojoworld (2008–2009)
- Astonishing Tales: Sabra (2009)
- Astonishing Tales: Shiver Man (2009)
- Astonishing Tales: Spider-Woman (Jessica Drew) (2009)
- Astonishing Tales: The Thing (2009)
- Astonishing Tales: Wolverine/Punisher (2008–2009)

Several stories from those series were reprinted in the six-issue limited series Astonishing Tales (vol. 2) (April–Sept. 2009).

Issue	A story	B story	C story	D story
1	Wolverine & Punisher Collected in Wolverine vs. Punisher	Iron Man 2020 Collected in Iron Man 2020	Iron Man	Cannonball & Sunspot vs Mojo Collected in Avengers by Jonathan Hickman Omnibus Vol 1
2	Wolverine & Punisher Collected in Wolverine vs. Punisher	Iron Man 2020 Collected in Iron Man 2020	M.O.D.O.K.	Cannonball & Sunspot vs Mojo Collected in Avengers by Jonathan Hickman Omnibus Vol 1
3	Wolverine & Punisher Collected in Wolverine vs. Punisher	Iron Man 2020 Collected in Iron Man 2020	Spider-Woman	Cannonball & Sunspot vs Mojo Collected in Avengers by Jonathan Hickman Omnibus Vol 1
4	Wolverine & Punisher Collected in Wolverine vs. Punisher	Iron Man 2020 Collected in Iron Man 2020	Daredevil	Cannonball & Sunspot vs Mojo Collected in Avengers by Jonathan Hickman Omnibus Vol 1
5	Wolverine & Punisher Collected in Wolverine vs. Punisher	Iron Man 2020 Collected in Iron Man 2020	Shiver Man	Cannonball & Sunspot vs Mojo Collected in Avengers by Jonathan Hickman Omnibus Vol 1
6	Wolverine & Punisher Collected in Wolverine vs. Punisher	Iron Man 2020 Collected in Iron Man 2020	Sabra	Cannonball & Sunspot vs Mojo Collected in Avengers by Jonathan Hickman Omnibus Vol 1

== Collected editions ==
- Essential Super-Villain Team-Up includes Doctor Doom stories from Astonishing Tales #1–8, 552 pages, September 2004, ISBN 978-0785115458
- Essential Man-Thing Volume 1 includes Astonishing Tales #12–13, 600 pages, December 2006, ISBN 978-0785121350
- Marvel Masterworks: Ka-Zar Volume 1 includes Astonishing Tales #1–16, 312 pages, January 2013, ISBN 978-0785159575
- Marvel Masterworks: Deathlok Volume 1 includes Astonishing Tales #25–28 and #30–36, 352 pages, November 2009, ISBN 978-0785130505
- Iron Man 2020 includes The Amazing Spider-Man Annual #20, Machine Man (vol. 2) #1-4, Death’s Head #10, Iron Man 2020 #1, Astonishing Tales: Iron Man 2020 #1-6, What If? (vol. 2) #53; 304 pages, April 2013, ISBN 978-1302913908
