= Jasper Sitwell =

Fictional character

- Jasper Sitwell; Art by Carlo Pagulayan.

Publication information
- Publisher: Marvel Comics
- First appearance: Strange Tales #144 (May 1966)
- Created by: Stan Lee (writer); Jack Kirby (artist)

In-story information
- Species: Human-turned-zombie
- Team affiliations: S.H.I.E.L.D. S.T.A.K.E.
- Notable aliases: Agent 22
- Abilities: Espionage skills Firearms expert

Jasper Sitwell is a fictional character, an espionage agent appearing in American comic books published by Marvel Comics.

The character was portrayed by Maximiliano Hernández in the Marvel Cinematic Universe.

== Publication history ==
Created by writer-editor Stan Lee and artist and co-plotter Jack Kirby, he first appeared in Strange Tales #144 (May 1966).

Jasper Sitwell appears as an agent of the fictional espionage agency S.H.I.E.L.D., beginning in the "Nick Fury, Agent of S.H.I.E.L.D." feature in Marvel Comics' Strange Tales #144 (cover-dated May 1966) and continuing into the subsequent Nick Fury, Agent of S.H.I.E.L.D. comic-book series in 1968. He became the S.H.I.E.L.D. liaison to defense industry contractor Tony Stark beginning in the "Iron Man" feature in Tales of Suspense #93 (September 1967), and continuing into that subsequent series as well. He was seldom featured from the early 1970s until the 1988 miniseries Nick Fury vs. S.H.I.E.L.D., and then again in the 1996–1997 series Iron Man (vol. 2). Sitwell afterward appeared in a three-issue arc of the superhero-team series The Avengers in 2000, and in Punisher War Journal (vol. 2) #1 (January 2007).

== Fictional character biography ==
Jasper Sitwell graduated at the top of his class at S.H.I.E.L.D. Academy, with particularly high marks in airborne jump school and underwater maneuvers. The agent's eager-beaver attitude meets initially with mock (and occasionally real) frustration when first introduced to S.H.I.E.L.D. director Nick Fury and second-in-command Dum Dum Dugan. However, Sitwell soon proves himself and earns his fellow agents' respect — albeit tinged with occasional humor aimed at his youthfulness and idealistic naïveté. Mentored by Fury and occasionally acting as interim director when Fury is on solo missions in the field, Sitwell is later assigned to Stark Industries as liaison between S.H.I.E.L.D. and the defense-industry contractor which designs and manufactures much of the ordnance and equipment for S.H.I.E.L.D. Sitwell confronts costumed assassins and terrorists, such as Grey Gargoyle, Spymaster (who shoots him and puts Sitwell in a coma for a time), and A.I.M. Sitwell is eventually reassigned back to S.H.I.E.L.D., but continues to be involved with Stark Industries.

Sitwell, like most of the S.H.I.E.L.D. leadership at the time, is seemingly killed by a self-aware, renegade Life Model Decoy (LMD), and replaced by an LMD, who is installed as executive director. The real Sitwell later turns up alive after having been brainwashed by Hydra, placed in suspended animation. He is sent after Fury and eventually freed of his brainwashing.

Sitwell is one of the many S.H.I.E.L.D. agents who refuse to join Norman Osborn's H.A.M.M.E.R. organization in the wake of the Skrull Secret Invasion. He and Dugan form a mercenary paramilitary group to combat H.A.M.M.E.R., Hydra, and Leviathan.

Sitwell is later killed saving Fury from the brainwashed Black Widow. He returned as a zombie through unknown means and was held in Area 13 by a S.H.I.E.L.D. division called S.T.A.K.E. Sitwell joins the Life Model Decoy of Dum Dum Dugan and Martin Reyna to fight Teen Abomination. After the defeat of Teen Abomination, Sitwell is returned to Area 13.

As part of the All-New, All-Different Marvel publishing line, Jasper Sitwell appears as a member of S.T.A.K.E.'s Howling Commandos.

== Powers and abilities ==
Jasper Sitwell has S.H.I.E.L.D. training in espionage, firearms, and hand-to-hand combat.

== Other versions ==
An alternate universe version of Jasper Sitwell from Earth-1610 appears in Ultimate Fallout #5.

== In other media ==
=== Television ===
Jasper Sitwell appears in The Avengers: Earth's Mightiest Heroes, voiced by Tom Kane.

=== Film ===
Jasper Sitwell appears in Hulk: Where Monsters Dwell, voiced by Mike Vaughn. This version is a member of the Howling Commandos.

=== Marvel Cinematic Universe ===
Jasper Sitwell appears in media set in the Marvel Cinematic Universe, portrayed by Maximiliano Hernández. This version is a Hispanic Hydra sleeper agent who works undercover as a S.H.I.E.L.D. agent.

- Sitwell is introduced in the film Thor, wherein S.H.I.E.L.D. discovers Mjolnir, establishes a base around it, and confiscates Jane Foster and Erik Selvig's research on the wormhole that brought it to Earth before encountering Thor and the Destroyer.
- Sitwell appears in the Marvel One-Shot short film The Consultant. He meets with fellow S.H.I.E.L.D. agent Phil Coulson to discuss the issue of the World Security Council wanting Emil Blonsky to be a part of the Avengers Initiative. They send the eponymous "Consultant", Tony Stark, to annoy General Thaddeus Ross and prevent him from releasing Blonsky.
- Sitwell makes a minor appearance in the film The Avengers.
- Sitwell appears in the Marvel One-Shot Item 47. He is assigned to track down two civilians using a Chitauri gun to rob banks. After eventually capturing them, he inducts them into S.H.I.E.L.D.
- Sitwell appears in the television series Agents of S.H.I.E.L.D., with Adam Faison portraying a younger version in a flashback. The fifth season episode "Rise and Shine" reveals that Sitwell attended a Hydra academy in his youth.
- In the film Captain America: The Winter Soldier, Steve Rogers, Natasha Romanoff, and Sam Wilson discover Sitwell's affiliation with Hydra. They capture and interrogate him for information until he is killed by the Winter Soldier.
- An alternate timeline variant of Sitwell appears in the film Avengers: Endgame.

=== Video games ===
- Jasper Sitwell appears in Marvel: Avengers Alliance.
- The MCU incarnation of Jasper Sitwell appears in Lego Marvel's Avengers, voiced by Keith Silverstein.
- Jasper Sitwell appears in Marvel Avengers Academy, voiced by Jesse Adam.

== See also ==
- List of S.H.I.E.L.D. members
