= Frankenstein's Monster (Marvel Comics) =

- Cover of The Monster of Frankenstein #1 (Jan. 1973); Art by Mike Ploog

Publication information
- Publisher: Marvel Comics
- First appearance: Menace #7 (Sept. 1953)
- Created by: Stan Lee; Joe Maneely

In-story information
- Species: Simulacrum (made from different human body parts)
- Team affiliations: Legion of the Unliving; First Line; Fearsome Four; Howling Commandos
- Notable aliases: Frankenstein, Adam
- Abilities: Superhuman strength and stamina Resistance to extreme cold temperatures

Frankenstein's Monster is a fictional character appearing in American comic books published by Marvel Comics. The character is based on the character in Mary Shelley's 1818 novel Frankenstein; or, The Modern Prometheus. The character has been adapted often in the comic book medium.

== Publication history ==
The first appearance of Frankenstein's Monster in the Marvel Comics Universe came in the five-page horror comics story "Your Name Is Frankenstein", by writer-editor Stan Lee and artist Joe Maneely in Menace #7 (September 1953), from Marvel's 1950s forerunner, Atlas Comics. The following decade, a robot replica of Frankenstein's Monster appeared as an antagonist in The X-Men #40 (Jan. 1968), by writer Roy Thomas and penciler Don Heck, and was destroyed by the titular team. The actual Monster first appeared in Marvel Comics continuity in a cameo flashback in "The Heir of Frankenstein" in The Silver Surfer #7 (Aug. 1969), by writer-editor Lee and penciler John Buscema.

The character received an ongoing series, titled Frankenstein in the postal indicia and initially The Monster of Frankenstein (issues #1–5) and later The Frankenstein Monster as the cover logo, that ran 18 issues (Jan. 1973–Sept. 1975). This series began with a three-issue retelling of the original novel, by writer Gary Friedrich and artist Mike Ploog. Several more issues continued his story into the 1890s, until he was placed in suspended animation and revived in modern times.

Thomas, Marvel Comics' editor-in-chief at that point in the 1970s, recalled in 2009:

I'd been working with [artist] Dick Giordano adapting Bram Stoker's Dracula [in the black-and-white horror-comics magazine Vampire Tales, published by Marvel parent company Magazine Management], so I wanted to start with the Shelley Frankenstein [novel], then bring [Frankenstein's Monster] into the present. But eager as I was to work with Mike Ploog on Frankenstein, I just didn't have the time. So I turned the project over to Gary, who did a fine job with it.

Friedrich in 2009 said he did not recall "whose idea it was to do a Frankenstein book", noting that "at this time, Marvel was cranking up the gears on the monster mags", which were introducing such new characters as Werewolf by Night and Ghost Rider. Ploog based his rendition of the Monster on a drawing by art director John Romita Sr., who was instructed to make the character dissimilar to the familiar Universal Pictures version.

Ploog drew the first six issues, self-inked except for issues #4-5, which were embellished by Marvel production manager and occasional inker John Verpoorten. The following four issues were penciled by John Buscema. After a final Friedrich-written issue, drawn by Bob Brown, the creative team of writer Doug Moench and penciler Val Mayerik brought the Monster from the 19th century to the present day, beginning with issue #12 (Sept. 1974). The duo continued through the final issue, with Bill Mantlo rather than Moench writing the finale.

Ploog had departed, Thomas recalled, because "Marvel was in a great surge of growth at that time, which resulted in frequent changes on artist/writer lineups on many, if not most of the titles. Mike was quite busy then". Ploog recalled disliking the planned change to bring the Monster into the present-day Marvel Universe. "I couldn't see Frankenstein battling with Spider-Man on 42nd Street". His successor, Buscema, was an established veteran and one of Marvel's premier artists. Friedrich said, "Working with Buscema [on the series] was a wonderful experience. John could draw about any type [of] book you could imagine. ... We never had a disagreement about anything, and his storytelling sense was superb". The series ended "because sales weren't good enough", Thomas recalled. "At the start, the book [had] sold well".

Concurrent with the color-comics series, the character appeared in his own modern-day feature in two of Curtis' black-and-white horror-comics magazines: Monsters Unleashed #2, 4-10 (Sept. 1973, Feb. 1974-Feb. 1975), by the Friedrich/Buscema team initially, followed by the Moench/Mayerik team; and in Legion of Monsters #1 (Sept. 1975), by Moench and Mayerik.

During the 1970s, the Monster guest-starred in the superhero titles The Avengers #131-132 (Jan.-Feb. 1975); Marvel Team-Up #36-37 (Aug.-Sept. 1975), appearing in the latter series opposite Spider-Man; and Iron Man #101-102 (Aug.-Sept. 1977); and in the supernatural title Tomb of Dracula #49 (Oct. 1976). As well, writer John Warner and artist Dino Castrillo adapted the Shelley novel in Marvel Classics Comics #20 (1977), in a 48-page story outside mainstream Marvel continuity. The character made only two Marvel appearances in the 1980s. The first four issues of The Monster of Frankenstein were reprinted in the miniseries Book of the Dead #1-4 (Dec. 1993-March 1994). Also that decade, he again confronted Spider-Man in Spider-Man Unlimited #21 (Aug. 1998).

In the 21st century, the Monster appeared prominently in the four-issue miniseries Bloodstone (December 2001–March 2002) and starred in a 14-page story, "To Be a Monster", by writer-artist Skottie Young in Legion of Monsters: Werewolf by Night #1 (April 2007).

== Fictional character biography ==
Frankenstein's Monster was built from human corpses by a scientist named Victor Frankenstein, in Ingolstadt, Bavaria, in the late 18th century. His efforts to fit in with regular humanity were futile due to his horrific form, and he was infuriated. Victor Frankenstein created and subsequently killed a mate for the Monster, who killed Frankenstein's bride Elizabeth in retaliation. After killing several people, the Monster fled to the Arctic. His creator pursued him, but died due to the cold. The Monster, anguished, tried to kill himself but only went into a suspended animation state from the cold.

In 1898, heat revived the Monster and he wandered again. He searched for the descendant of Victor Frankenstein and finally ended up in Transylvania. The Monster clashed with Dracula and his vocal cords were injured. Vincent Frankenstein finally found him and tried to give him a new brain, dying in the process as he was shot by an angry maidservant before the Monster could kill him. Frustrated, the Monster fell into a glacier an again returned to a suspended animation state.

At some point, the Monster was temporarily pulled out of time to serve in Kang the Conqueror's Legion of the Unliving to fight the Avengers.

The Monster eventually emerged from suspended animation in a glacier and into the modern world. After several adventures (during one of which his brain was transferred with that of a scientist longing for a new life, then a rat, and later restored, and another in which he first battled, then aided, the Werewolf by Night (Jack Russell), he was aided by Veronica Frankenstein, a distant relative of his creator. This woman was kindly, and repaired his vocal cords. Later, the Monster met and joined Veronica's sister Baroness Victoria Frankenstein and her charges called the Children of the Damned, dwarf-like artificial beings who were created by Basil and Ludwig Frankenstein's failed human experiments.

The Monster was captured, along with Spider-Man and the Man-Wolf by Baron Ludwig von Schtupf, a.k.a. the Monster Maker, to be used to create an army of amalgamated monsters with the Monster's superhuman strength, Spider-Man's wall-crawling powers and the Man-Wolf's appearance. Von Schtupf was defeated by Spider-Man and the Monster, then Spider-Man defeated the Man-Wolf on his own. Both of them were taken into custody of S.H.I.E.L.D., due to S.H.I.E.L.D. agent Judith Klemmer's involvement in the case.

Victoria discovered Bram Velsing, the man who would become the Dreadknight, while he was dying in the wilderness. While under her care, he made a variety of weapons and took possession of the Hellhorse, the flying mutant horse (which the Children found and Victoria, using her ancestor's methods, tried to restore to normal, but instead only mutated it further) that had originally been used as Elendil by Nathan Garrett, the original criminal Black Knight. He attempted to force more resources from Victoria and took over the new Castle Frankenstein, but was defeated by the Monster and Iron Man. The Dreadknight, left wounded at the finale of the battle, was returned to Victoria's custody, though he later escaped with the Hellhorse and his weaponry.

The Monster then met Spider-Man for a second time.

The Monster later departed from Victoria's company. (Note: As related in Doctor Strange vol. 2 #37.) Ulysses Bloodstone later befriended the Monster, who came to occasionally stay at his mansion, eventually acting as its caretaker. The Monster, sometimes using the name Adam, accompanied Bloodstone on his missions. Bloodstone trusted Adam to give his daughter Elsa a Bloodgem fragment in the Bloodstone choker when she was old enough.

When exploring Bloodstone House, an adult Elsa discovers a secret chamber in which she encounters Adam, who tells Elsa about her father. Adam gives her the Bloodstone Choker, which attaches itself to her neck. Adam later designs a costume for Elsa, patterned after her father's. The two have a number of adventures together, encountering beings such as Dracula and N'Kantu, the Living Mummy. Elsa lives in Bloodstone Manor with her mother and ally Adam the Frankenstein Monster, while pursuing a monster-hunting occupation.

At some point, an intelligent clone of the monster, simply named Frankenstein, was created. The clone became a member of S.H.I.E.L.D.'s Paranormal Containment Unit, nicknamed the Howling Commandos.

During the "Fear Itself" storyline, Frankenstein's Monster, Howard the Duck, Nighthawk, and the She-Hulk come together as the Fearsome Four when the Man-Thing is driven on a rampage. They later discover a plot by the Psycho-Man to use the Man-Thing's volatile empathy to create a weapon.

The Hellfire Club sent an army of Frankenstein Monsters created by Victor Frankenstein's contemporary descendant Baron Maximilian Frankenstein (born Maximilian von Katzenelnbogen) to attack the Jean Grey School for Higher Learning, but they were defeated by the X-Men. Learning of the existence of a Frankenstein descendant, the Monster comes to exact his vengeance on the Hellfire Club.

Frankenstein's Monster is later recruited by Phil Coulson to join his incarnation of the Howling Commandos and combat Dormammu's Mindless Plague.

== Powers and abilities ==
Frankenstein's Monster is a result of a biological experiment by Baron Victor Frankenstein which grafted pieces of various corpses together which were animated through an undisclosed procedure involving electricity. In the first issue of The Monster of Frankenstein, a series of injections is used rather than the traditional electric jump-starting procedure to make the creature live. The Monster has superhuman strength and stamina, and can be placed in suspended animation when exposed to intense cold without suffering any physical damage.

== Clones of Frankenstein's Monster ==
There had been many clones of Frakenstein's Monster that appeared in the comics:

=== First Nazi clone ===
The first Nazi clone of Frankenstein's Monster was a creation of Nazi sympathizer Anna Frankenstein and her lover Von Rottz in the summer of 1944. They had hoped to use the works of Victor Frankenstein to create an army of monsters to sell to the Nazis. When her Frankenstein's Monster was complete, Anna wrote a letter to Captain America and Bucky Barnes in order to lure them to her. They were attacked by the Nazi clone Frankenstein's Monster twice, with the second time having Bucky snatched by Frankenstein's Monster. Von Rottz assisted Captain America into rescuing Bucky from being thrown off the castle by the Nazi clone Frankenstein's Monster. Before Von Rottz could betray Captain America, he is strangled to death by the Nazi clone of Frankenstein's Monster. Then the Nazi clone of Frankenstein's Monster grabbed Anna Frankenstein and fled into the woods. After freeing Anna, Captain America lured the Nazi clone of Frankenstein's Monster into the quicksand, where it drowned. Anna felt guilty over what she did and joined her creation's fate, committing suicide by walking into the quicksand. Although Anna Frankenstein's father set fire to the laboratory, other people have utilized Victor's techniques to create other monsters.

=== Second Nazi clone ===
Marvel's second World War II-era Frankenstein Monster clone, in The Invaders #31 (Aug. 1978). Cover art by Joe Sinnott.

When Jackie Falsworth finds an oversized Nazi cap inside a box of souvenirs, Captain America tells her of the mission of how they acquired the hat and who it originally belonged to. In early 1942, Dr. Basil Frankenstein is a Nazi scientist who is the descendant of Victor Frankenstein. Basil Frankenstein and his Japanese assistant Dr. Kitagowa had moved to Victor Frankenstein's castle to continue his mission of creating an army of zombie Nazi soldiers. However, word of Basil Frankenstein's activities leaked out to the Allied Forces and the Human Torch and Toro went out to investigate. When Human Torch and Toro did not return, Captain America, Bucky, and Namor went out to look for them. When the other Invaders arrive, they find the villagers that live near Castle Frankenstein about to storm the castle. The villagers explained to the Invaders about the arrival of Human Torch and Toro and the info about the monster that had torn through their village. Captain America and Bucky went to Castle Frankenstein to investigate, while Namor held the angry mob at bay. Captain America and Bucky entered the castle and were overcome by the Nazi clone of Frankenstein's Monster. Upon Captain America and Bucky being brought before Basil Frankenstein, he revealed that he not only was making an army of Nazi zombies for Adolf Hitler, he plans to transplant his brain into Captain America's body. It turned out that Basil Frankenstein had been in a lab accident that paralyzed his hands and legs. Due to Basil Frankenstein being in love with Dr. Kitagowa, Basil wanted her to place his brain into Captain America's body so that they can finally have a physical love. It was then shown that Basil Frankenstein had captured the Human Torch and Toro so that Basil Frankenstein could siphon the Human Torch's energies to make his Nazi clone of Frankenstein's Monster bigger and stronger. In the nick of time, Namor arrived at the castle and freed the Invaders. During the battle with the Nazi clone of Frankenstein's Monster, the creature was knocked into a wall of electrical equipment. This was enough to free the Nazi clone of Frankenstein's Monster from Basil's mental control, where he grabbed Basil and Dr. Kitagowa and took them to the castle's parapets. Proclaiming that he was no longer Basil Frankenstein's slave, the Nazi clone of Frankenstein's Monster wanted to return to death and jumped from the castle, taking Basil Frankenstein and Dr. Kitagowa with him.

=== Howling Commandos' clone ===
An intelligent clone of Frankenstein's Monster nicknamed "Frank" was a member of the Paranormal Containment Unit of the international law-enforcement agency S.H.I.E.L.D. in issues of the series Nick Fury's Howling Commandos. Unlike Frankenstein's Monster and his other clones, Frank has a mace for a right hand, where it can be launched out on a chain similar to a flail. There is a large cannon where the radius of his left arm is supposed to be, where it houses different firearms like machine gun barrels and one detachable handheld gun. How this cloning process did not produce different clones of the various individual body parts making up the original Monster was briefly mentioned in issue #1. The response was "Don't go there".

Frank was among the monsters that gathered to prepare a defense on Area 13 when Merlin's army was attacking. Frank held his ground while Warwolf and Gorilla-Man released all the giant monsters in their possession where they trampled over Merlin's army. When Frank opted to tend to the injured, the Howling Commandos chose to pursue the remaining members of Merlin's army. Frank was present when the Mole Man's forces showed up to help fight Merlin's army.

== Other versions ==
=== Earth X ===
In the Earth X reality, the head of Frankenstein's Monster is among the trophies of Kraven the Hunter.

=== Marvel 2099 ===
In the unified Marvel 2099 reality of Earth-2099, Frankenstein's Monster is a member of the 2099 version of the Avengers. He is among those who were killed by the 2099 version of the Masters of Evil.

=== Marvel Adventures ===
In the pages of "Marvel Adventures", Frankenstein's Monster was found in a crate and briefly fought Spider-Man and Hawkeye before disappearing into the night.

=== Secret Wars (2015) ===
During the "Secret Wars" storyline, a version of Frankenstein's Monster lives in Monster Metropolis beneath the Battleworld domain of the Kingdom of Manhattan.

== In other media ==
=== Television ===
- Frankenstein's Monster appears in the Spider-Man and His Amazing Friends episode "The Transylvania Connections", voiced by Ron Feinberg. This version is a robotic duplicate created by Dracula.
- Frankenstein's Monster appears in the Ultimate Spider-Man two-part episode "Blade and the Howling Commandos", voiced by Kevin Michael Richardson. This version has a sledgehammer for a left hand, a retractable right hand-mounted machine gun, and is a member of Nick Fury's Howling Commandos.
- Frankenstein's Monster appears in Hulk and the Agents of S.M.A.S.H., voiced again by Kevin Michael Richardson. Like the previous appearance, this version is a member of Nick Fury's Howling Commandos.

=== Film ===
- Frankenstein's Monster appears in Kyoufu Densetsu Kaiki! Frankenstein, voiced by Richard Epcar in the English dub.

=== Video games ===
- Frankenstein's Monster appears as an unlockable playable character in Marvel Super Hero Squad Online, voiced by Steve Blum.

== Reception ==
This version of the character was ranked #8 on a listing of Marvel Comics' monster characters in 2015.

== Collected editions ==
A number of the character's appearances have been collected into a trade paperback:

Essential Monster of Frankenstein (496 pages, collects Monster of Frankenstein #1-5, Frankenstein Monster #6-18, Giant-Size Werewolf #2, Monsters Unleashed #2 and 4-10 and Legion of Monsters #1, October 2004, ISBN 0-7851-1634-6)

== See also ==
- Dick Briefer
- Frankenstein (DC Comics)
- Frankenstein (Prize Comics)
