= Howling Commandos =

Several fictional groups in Marvel Comics

Publication information
- Publisher: Marvel Comics
- First appearance: Sgt. Fury and his Howling Commandos #1 (March 1964)
- Created by: Stan Lee; Jack Kirby

The Howling Commandos is the name of several fictional groups appearing in American comic books published by Marvel Comics. The team also appears in the franchises developed for other media.

== Fictional team history ==
=== Original Incarnation (1963) ===
The first group of Howling Commandos (introduced in their own 1963 comic book series) was an elite unit of the United States Army Rangers formed in World War II. The original team consisted of:

- Sergeant Nicholas Joseph "Nick" Fury
- Corporal Timothy Aloysius Cadwallader "Dum Dum" Dugan
- Private Isadore "Izzy" Cohen
- Private Gabriel Jones
- Private Dino Manelli
- Private Robert "Rebel" Ralston
- Private Jonathan "Junior" Juniper
- Private Percival "Pinky" Pinkerton: A British soldier, in issue #8.
- Private Eric Koenig: A defector from Nazi Germany. He joined the squad in issue #27.
- Private Jim Morita
- Private Jacques "Frenchie" Dernier

Occasional other members would join for an issue or two before being killed, transferred, or otherwise leaving (such as Fred Jones in issue #81). Also daringly for the time, the series killed Fury's girlfriend, British nurse Pamela Hawley, introduced in issue #4 and killed in a London air raid in #18.

=== Nick Fury's Howling Commandos ===
A second Howling Commandos team was introduced in the 2005 series Nick Fury's Howling Commandos as a supernatural unit that works for S.H.I.E.L.D. Its members were:

- Clay Quartermain: The commanding officer of Area 13. He takes over in the first issue from Dum Dum Dugan.
- Warwolf (Vince Marcus): The field leader. He is a werewolf who can transform voluntarily whenever Mars is in the night sky.
- Nina Price, Vampire by Night: A woman who is half-vampire and half-werewolf.
- N'Kantu, the Living Mummy: A previously existing character. N'Kantu is an undead prince of Ancient Egypt.
- Frankenstein: An intelligent clone of the original Frankenstein's Monster. How this process did not produce different clones of the various individual body parts making up the original Monster was briefly mentioned in issue #1. The response was "Don't go there".
- Gorilla-Man I: A previously existing character. Kenneth Hale is a man trapped in a gorilla's body. He is now a member of the Agents of Atlas.
- John Doe: A zombie depicted as having normal human-level intelligence, in contrast to other zombie characters in the Marvel universe.

=== Secret Invasion ===
A third group of "Commandos" are introduced in Mighty Avengers #13. After discovering the Skrull invasion, Nick Fury assembles a team made up of the offspring of various superheroes and supervillains. This team members are:

- Quake: Former S.H.I.E.L.D. member and daughter of Mister Hyde. She possesses the power to create earthquake-like vibrations.
- Phobos: The ten-year-old son of Ares. He possesses the power to cause fear in others by looking in their eyes.
- Druid: The son of Doctor Druid who has inherited some of his father's skill with magic.
- Yo-Yo: The daughter of the Griffin. She can run at superhuman speed and bounces back to the point where she began running.
- Hellfire: The grandson of the Phantom Rider. He is able to charge a chain with fire to wield as a weapon.
- Stonewall: The son of the Absorbing Man, who possesses superhuman strength. Daisy Johnson bails him out of jail after he is imprisoned for hitting a cop.

=== Dark Reign ===
In Secret Warriors #4 and #5 as seen during the Dark Reign storyline, it is revealed that 1,200 S.H.I.E.L.D. agents refused to join H.A.M.M.E.R. following Norman Osborn's rise to power. Under the leadership of Dum Dum Dugan and Gabe Jones, they became a private military company which is hired by Nick Fury to fight against both Hydra and H.A.M.M.E.R.

=== Black Ops version ===
A new incarnation of the Howling Commandos is ordered to apprehend the Punisher after he relocates to Los Angeles. The black ops version is led by Sidewinder and its members include Ruby Red, Myers, and Buzzkill.

=== Phil Coulson's Howling Commandos ===
Phil Coulson later formed his version of the Howling Commandos to combat Dormammu's Mindless Plague. The team consisted of:

- Frankenstein's Monster
- Man-Thing
- N'Kantu, the Living Mummy
- Zombie

=== Howling Commandos of S.H.I.E.L.D ===
A new team of Howling Commandos under the command of S.T.A.K.E. were part of the All-New All-Different Marvel led by the rebuilt LMD of Dum Dum Dugan and under the supervision of Warwolf. It consists of:

- Jasper Sitwell (zombie form)
- Vampire by Night
- Man-Thing
- Manphibian
- Orrgo
- Teen Abomination
- Hit-Monkey

== Other versions ==
=== MAX ===
An alternate universe incarnation of the Howling Commandos appears in Fury: Peacemaker. This version is an OSS special operations unit created by Nick Fury. Most of the unit's lineup were killed following D-Day, with only Fury and two unidentified members surviving.

=== Ultimate Marvel ===
Two incarnations of the Howling Commandos from Earth-1610 appear in the Ultimate Marvel imprint:

- The members of the first Howling Commandos were killed by the Iraqi Republican Guard, with only Nick Fury and Dum Dum Dugan surviving.
- The second incarnation of the Howling Commandos is formed during the Dark Ultimates' attack on Earth and consists of Nick Fury, Monica Chang, Abigail Brand, Punisher, Falcon, Stature, Dum Dum Dugan, Danny Ketch, Abomination, and Hercules.

=== Mrs. Deadpool and the Howling Commandos ===
An alternate universe incarnation of the Howling Commandos appears in the Secret Wars tie-in Mrs. Deadpool and the Howling Commandos, consisting of Frankenstein's Monster, Invisible Man, Man-Thing, Marcus the Centaur, N'Kantu the Living Mummy, and Werewolf by Night.

== In other media ==
=== Marvel Cinematic Universe ===
The WWII Howling Commandos appear in media set in the Marvel Cinematic Universe, consisting of Steve Rogers / Captain America, James Falsworth, Bucky Barnes, Dum Dum Dugan, Gabe Jones, Jim Morita, Jacques Dernier, Samuel Sawyer, Pinky Pinkerton, and Junior Juniper. Following their first appearance in Captain America: The First Avenger, the Howling Commandos appear in Captain America: The Winter Soldier as part of an in-universe Smithsonian exhibit. The group also appears in the Agents of S.H.I.E.L.D. episode "Shadows" and the Agent Carter episode "The Iron Ceiling". Additionally, an alternate timeline incarnation of the Howling Commandos appears in the What If...? episode "What If... Captain Carter Were the First Avenger?".

=== Television ===
- The WWII incarnation of the Howling Commandos make a cameo appearance in the X-Men: The Animated Series episode "Old Soldiers."
- The WWII incarnation of the Howling Commandos appear in The Avengers: Earth's Mightiest Heroes.
- Nick Fury's Howling Commandos appear in Ultimate Spider-Man. Consisting of Blade, Werewolf by Night / Jack Russell, N'Kantu the Living Mummy, Frankenstein's Monster, Man-Thing, & Max the Invisible Man.
- Nick Fury's Howling Commandos appear in Hulk and the Agents of S.M.A.S.H.. Consisting of Blade, Werewolf by Night / Jack Russell, N'Kantu the Living Mummy, Frankenstein's Monster, & Man-Thing.
