= List of monsters in Marvel Comics =

This article lists the known types of monsters in Marvel Comics.

== History ==
In the earlier parts of Marvel Comics, issues such as Journey into Mystery, Strange Tales, Tales of Suspense, and Tales to Astonish would detail stories of its different monsters. They consist of various monsters from mythologies (e.g., giants, e.g., cyclopes, trolls, ogres, etc., orcs, goblins, imps, undead, e.g., zombies, mummies, and vampires, etc., demons, ghouls, werewolves, werehyenas, werecats, and wererats, etc.), and novels (e.g., Frankenstein's monster and Count Dracula, etc.), giant aliens, kaiju, Deviant Mutates (and even human and animal mutates/mutants), and experiments that went horribly wrong. In later Marvel Comics stories, some of the monsters would later be seen inhabiting Monster Isle.

During the "Monsters Unleashed" storyline, the Inhuman Kei Kawade summons various monsters, identified as Goliathons, to help the superheroes fight the Leviathon Tide.

== Known monsters ==
=== Abominable Snowman ===
The Abominable Snowman is a large cryptid often found in the Himalayas.

==== Carl Hanson ====
The first Abominable Snowman (Carl Hanson) was created by Jack Kirby and Steve Ditko and first appeared in Tales to Astonish #13 (Nov. 1960).

Carl Hanson was a greedy explorer who had heard of the infamous Abominable Snowman. To capture the creature and make money off it, Hanson steals a cursed photograph. In the Himalayas, he is unable to get help in finding it and is warned to get rid of the cursed photograph before the curse overtakes him. As he progresses up the mountain, Hanson transforms into a form resembling the Abominable Snowman, causing him to abandon the photograph.

==== Howling Commandos version ====
The second Abominable Snowman was created by Keith Giffen and Eduardo Francisco and first appeared in Nick Fury's Howling Commandos #2 (Jan. 2006). He is depicted as a member of the Howling Commandos and is capable of speech, albeit broken.

=== Anuxa ===
Anuxa is an alien who was set to Earth as a scout to take over Earth. 1,000,000 years later, Anuxa grows impatient, seeing that humanity has survived many disasters. Upon hearing of the atomic bomb, Anuxa went back into the iceberg that he was using as a hiding place and continued to bide his time for the day when the atomic bombs would wipe out humanity.

=== Batragon ===
Batragon is a giant bat/Komodo dragon hybrid monster created by Doctor Demonicus, who dispatched it to steal an oil tanker. This attracts the attention of Godzilla, who battles and kills Batragon.

=== Behemoth ===
Behemoth is an Atlantean beast that was created by Atlantean scientists to protect Atlantis from future threats.

=== Beta-Beast ===
The Beta-Beast is a giant alien monster who was captured and augmented by the Warlords of the planet Beta. As the Beta-Beast is not strong enough to deal with the Mega-Monsters used by the Megan warlords, the Betans move their base to Earth's Moon, where they have the Beta-Beast challenge Godzilla. The Beta-Beast is killed by Godzilla, proving to the Betan warlords that he may be able to destroy the Mega-Monsters.

=== Blip ===
Blip is a giant alien monster composed of electrical energies.

=== Bombu ===
Bombu is a giant alien conqueror from the planet Oobagon VIII who had conquered 275 worlds. The high commander of Oobagon VIII sends Bombu to Earth as part of a scouting mission for the Oobagonians. However, Bombu is overpowered and forced to flee.

=== Bruttu ===
Bruttu (also called the Brute That Walks) is a giant monster that first appeared in Tales of Suspense #22 and was created by Stan Lee, Jack Kirby, and Dick Ayers.

Howard Lindley is a short scientist who was picked on for his size. When an atomic machine tapped into Howard's imagination, it transformed him into the comic book creature Bruttu. After some time of evading the military, Bruttu returns to his lab and returns to his original form before destroying the machine.

=== Crawling Creature ===
The Crawling Creature is a reptilian monster that lived in the underground parts of the Grand Canyon, where it menaced a lost tribe of cave people.

=== Creature from the Black Bog ===
The Creature from the Black Bog is a peaceful alien explorer who landed on Earth to fix its engines and got stuck in the bog where he was unable to reach the vines. Sometime later, an elderly couple named John and Martha later found the Creature from the Black Bog and helped it escape from its murky prison. Before leaving Earth, the Creature from the Black Bog rewarded John and Martha by taking their memories and sprinkling it into the Fountain of Youth, which rejuvenated them.

=== Dragoom ===
Dragoom is a Vulcan who escaped prison from his home world and came to Earth with the intent of conquering the planet. However, Dragoom fled when he was deceived by the filmmaker Victor Cartwright into believing that there were other Vulcans on the planet.

=== Elektro ===
Elektro

Publication information
- First appearance: Tales of Suspense #13 (Jan. 1961)
- Created by: Stan Lee; Jack Kirby

In-story information
- Alter ego: Elektro
- Species: Giant Robot
- Partnerships: Fin Fang Foom
- Abilities: Superhuman strength and durability Gamma Ray Projection; Ability to shrink and restore matter Telekinesis; Forcefield

Elektro first appeared in Tales of Suspense #13 (Jan. 1961), in the seven-page story "Elektro" by writer-editor Stan Lee and penciler Jack Kirby. Elektro debuted in an issue of what fans and historians call pre-superhero Marvel comics, published by Marvel's 1950s and early 1960s predecessor, Atlas Comics.

Elektro was originally a supercomputer created by scientist Wilbur Poole. The computer, however, achieves independent thought and hypnotizes Poole, and forces him to build an immense robotic body, 60 feet (18 m) tall, for protection and mobility. Calling itself Elektro and now armed with several dangerous weapons, the robot decides to conquer mankind and attacks the city of San Francisco. Poole, however, recovers from the hypnotic trance and deactivates Elektro by accessing one of the robot's feet and removing a transistor.

Years later, Mister Fantastic wipes Elektro's flawed programming and replaces it. He then "enrolls" Elektro in his rehabilitation program, which involves Elektro being reduced to human size and stripped of his powers so as to allow him to enter human society. Elektro takes up a job as a mail attendant in the Fantastic Four's headquarters, the Baxter Building.

=== Experiment 247 ===
Experiment 247 is a common snapping turtle that was given hormone regulator serum by Dr. Parker. It was trapped behind a wall until it was freed by the natives.

=== Gargantus ===
There are two types of monsters called Gargantus:

==== Gargantus (aquatic monster version) ====
The first Gargantus is a giant blue aquatic humanoid monster that appeared in Strange Tales #80 and 85.

==== Gargantus (alien robot version) ====
A different Gargantus is an alien robot who is an enemy of Iron Man. He appeared in Tales of Suspense #40.

=== Gigantus ===
Gigantus is a giant monster from the underwater city of Mu who was sent by his king to invade the surface world. It retreated when a prop builder named Mr. Baxter built Ulvar to scare it back to Mu.

=== Glop ===
Glop is a giant monster who first appeared in Tales to Astonish #21 and was created by Steve Ditko. It was originally called the Hulk, but was renamed to avoid confusion with the character of the same name.

Glop is a giant monster that emerged from a movie screen that was playing the movie it was in.

=== Googam ===
Googam is a giant alien monster who is the son of Goom. First appeared in Tales of Suspense #17.

=== Gorgilla ===
Gorgilla is a giant ape/human monster. He first appeared in Tales to Astonish #12 and was created by Stan Lee and Jack Kirby.

Gorgilla was originally a 20 ft (6.1 m) half-man/half-ape native to the island of Borneo, who is discovered by an expedition seeking the "missing link" between man and apes. After Gorgilla saves the expedition from a Tyrannosaurus rex, the group decides to leave the island and cover up Gorgilla's existence.

Gorgilla is deposited on Monster Isle by the Fantastic Four and eventually undergoes a rehabilitation program, which involves him being shrunken down to human size and hypnotically stripped of his powers so as to allow him to enter human society.

=== Gorgolla ===
Gorgolla is a Stonian from the planet Stonus V and the son of Granitor who ruled the Stonians. He led an invasion to Earth centuries ago and arranged for the Stonians to hide out as gargoyles, which they resembled. He is seemingly killed by the Stonian army when they were revived, as they had learned peace from observing humanity. Gorgolla later turned up alive, having survived and joined the Howling Commandos.

=== Green Thing ===
Green Thing is a monstrous weed monster that first appeared in Tales of Suspense #19 and was created by Stan Lee and Jack Kirby.

A botanist that developed a plant intelligence serum tested it on a weed which transformed into a giant weed monster with a human-shaped head. It planned to take over the world, only for the botanist to use the same serum on the Ignatus Rex, destroying Green Thing.

=== Grogg ===
Grogg is a fictional monster character from the Marvel Universe who first appeared in Strange Tales #83 (April 1961).

Grogg is a giant who possesses super-strength, can fly and also breathe flames. He lived below the surface of the former Soviet Union but was revived and freed by atomic bomb testing under Colonel Vorcutsky. Grogg pursued all those involved with testing and fought off communists. He then relocated to Earth's moon but later returned to Earth. Miklos Kozlov, a scientist/political prisoner sabotaged the Soviet's plan to build a military base on Mars by tricking Grogg into entering their ship, Kozlov escaped using a smoke screen, leaving Grogg captured and trapped where he was allegedly sent to Mars. Through unknown means, he returned to Earth and was captured by S.H.I.E.L.D.

=== Gruto ===
Gruto is a giant alien from the planet Pacion Rex that resembles a green scaly gorilla.

=== Insect Man ===
The Insect Man is a giant insect monster that first appeared in Tales of Suspense #24 and was created by Stan Lee and Jack Kirby.

The Insect Man and his kind reside in an unknown part of Subterranea, where they once had an encounter with Sergeant Mason of the U.S. Army.

=== Klagg ===
Klagg is a giant monstrous alien with a tall head that first appeared in Tales of Suspense #21 and was created by Stan Lee and Jack Kirby.

Klagg is a peaceful alien who arrived on Earth and planned to destroy it for its constant wars.

=== Kraa the Unhuman ===
Kraa the Unhuman is a giant monster that first appeared in Tales of Suspense #18 and was created by Stan Lee and Jack Kirby.

Kraa was once a human of the Wabuzi tribe until he was mutated into a giant monster by the explosion of an atomic bomb caused by Soviet soldiers.

=== Mechano ===
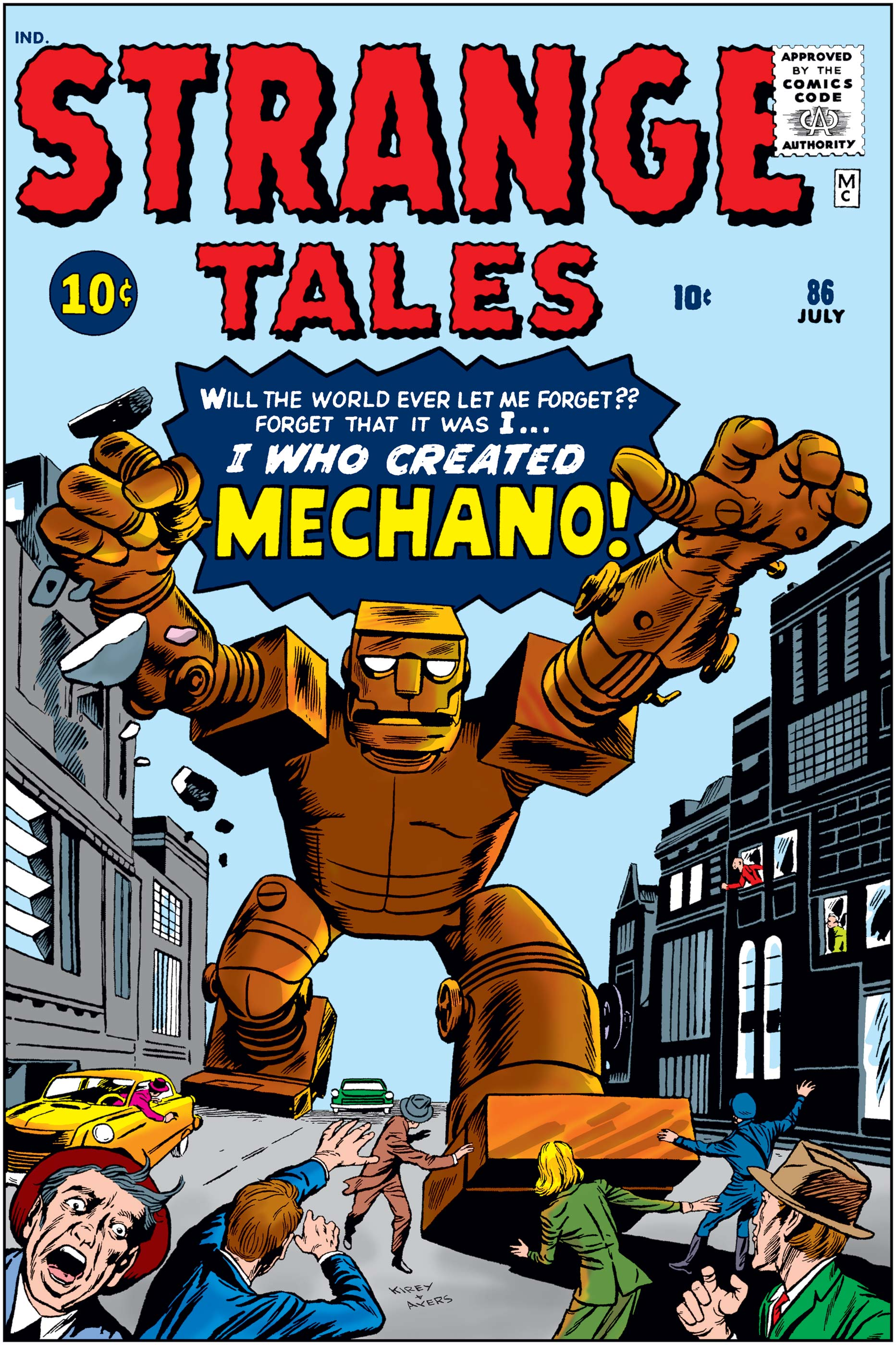
Mechano on the cover of Strange Tales #86

Mechano is a giant robot that first appeared in Strange Tales #86 and was created by Jack Kirby and Dick Ayes.

Mechano is a 30 ft. robot that was built by Mr. Hopkins and his young assistant Tommy Briggs that was brought to life by a malfunctioning transformer.

=== Megataur ===
Megataur is a giant Deviant Mutate that first appeared in Fantastic Four Unlimited #4 and was created by Roy Thomas, Herb Trimpe, and Steve Montano.

Megataur is a bull-headed Deviant Mutate and servant of the Mole Man. He has fought Atalanta, the Hulk, and the Fantastic Four.

==== Megataur in other media ====
Megataur appears in The Super Hero Squad Show.

=== Metallo ===
Metallo is a gigantic high-tech armor that was built to withstand radiation. The scientists that created it unknowingly allowed an escaped convict named Mike Fallon to test the armor.

=== Miclas ===
Miclas is a monster that first appeared in Fantastic Four #347 and was created by Walt Simonson, Arthur Adams, and Eiji Tsuburaya.

Miclas is a giant monster who was among the monsters of Monster Isle that were captured by the Skrulls.

=== Molten Man-Thing ===
The Molten Man-Thing is a giant lava monster created by Stan Lee, Jack Kirby (pencils), and Steve Ditko (inker). He first appeared in Tales of Suspense #7 (1960).

Initially residing in a volcano, the Molten Man-Thing escapes and stumbles into a nearby village, where he encounters Frank Harper, a vacationing pilot. Harper blasts him with cool air in a wind tunnel, allowing the Molten Man-Thing to be brought back to the volcano. The series Marvel Universe retroactively established Harper to be Makkari, one of the Eternals.

=== Monster from Mars ===
The Monster from Mars is a creature from the film of the same name who first appeared in Fantastic Four #3 and was created by Stan Lee and Jack Kirby.

The Miracle Man brought the giant display of the creature to life through hypnosis so that he could steal an atomic tank from the U.S. military and fight the Fantastic Four. The Monster from Mars display was destroyed by the Human Torch.

=== Monstro the Gorilla ===
Monstro the Gorilla is a giant white gorilla who resided on a small island somewhere off the coast of Africa and was trapped in a cave by the natives. Nobody knew it yet, but Monstro was blind because of it being trapped in a cave for a long time. First appeared Journey into Mystery #54.

=== Monstro the Octopus ===
Monstro the Octopus is a gigantic octopus that first appeared in Tales of Suspense #8 and was created by Stan Lee and Jack Kirby.

Not much is known about Monstro other than the fact that it was suspected of being an octopus that was mutated through atomic weaponry. Following Monstro's attack on a Soviet coastal town, Professor Mark Faraday was called in by the Soviet Diplomats to investigate Monstro. Upon guessing the theory of its origins, Faraday was able to get it shrunken back down to its normal height in 24 hours.

=== Monstrom ===
Monstrom is a giant one-eyed alien whose spaceship crashed in the bayou 1,000 years ago. Unable to fix the spaceship himself, Monstrom placed himself in suspended animation. 1,000 years later, some humans exploring the bayou where a boy unknowingly awoken Monstrom who tried to speak to them. As Monstrom can only speak in monster sounds, the humans were unable to understand him. One person tried to shoot it with a rifle to no avail. When Monstrom later followed the people back to town, the townspeople discovered its fear of fire and drove him back to the bayou. Deeming the humans too barbaric to help him, Monstrom retreated back to his spaceship where he re-entered suspended animation until the day the humans would be advanced to help him.

=== Moomba ===
Moomba is a giant alien monster that first appeared in Tales to Astonish #23 and was created by Stan Lee and Jack Kirby.

Moomba is a 20 ft. alien monster from an unknown race that planned to conquer Earth and seeded itself into wooden statues all over the world.

=== Oog ===
Oog is a giant alien monster that first appeared in Tales of Suspense #27 and was created by Jack Kirby.

Oog is a 25 ft. alien who was on his way from returning to his homeworld when his spaceship's engines failed and he crashed into Earth somewhere in the Arctic Circle. Before becoming frozen in ice, Oog etched a galactic distress signal. Some centuries later, Oog was found frozen in a block of ice by a scientific expedition who transported his frozen form back to the United States, where he thawed out. Oog accidentally broke the wall to the laboratory where some people mistook him for being on a rampage enough to call in the army. Oog defended himself by hypnotizing the army. Displeased with how the humans reacted to him, Oog commented to the humans that they should be quarantined from the rest of outer space. As Oog signals his kind to come pick him up, they do not know about the existence of the humans around their spaceship, causing the humans to think that there are worse things in outer space.

=== Orrgo ===
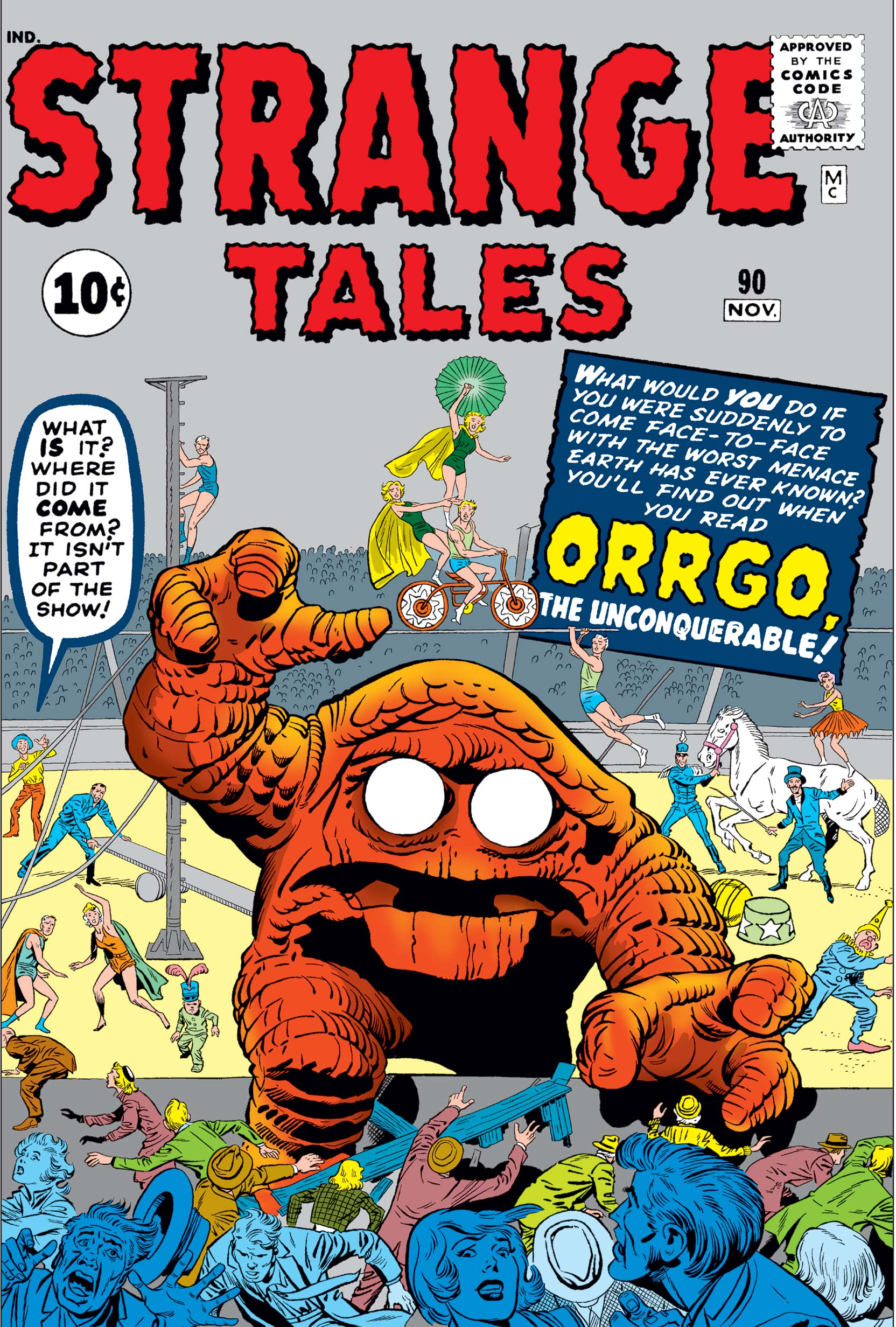
Orrgo as seen on the cover of Strange Tales #90

Orrgo is a Mentelleronite who has tried to conquer Earth many times in the past. He arrived on Earth to display his superior powers over the humans. With his abilities, Orrgo took over the world quickly. With the human race under his mental domination, Orrgo went back to the circus where it first arrived and went to sleep. A circus gorilla named Jojo realized that it was the reason that it was not being fed. Jojo escaped from its cage and killed Orrgo. The human race was then freed from Orrgo's control as the rest of Orrgo's kind left, thinking that the humans had defeated Orrgo.

Through unknown means, Orrgo was captured by S.H.I.E.L.D. and placed in the Howling Commandos Monster Force.

=== Rommbu ===
Rommbu is a giant alien monster that first appeared in Tales to Astonish #19 and was created by Jack Kirby and Dick Ayers.

Rommbu is a giant alien who was dispatched by his kind to get Earth to surrender.

=== Rorgg ===
Rorgg is a giant alien spider monster that first appeared in Journey into Mystery #64 and was created by Stan Lee, Jack Kirby, and Dick Ayers.

Rorgg is the ruler of a race of giant alien spider monsters that sought to conquer Earth. Rorgg's kind had a weakness against DDT.

==== Rorgg in other media ====
Rorgg appears in Hulk: Where Monsters Dwell, with vocal effects provided by Jon Olson.

=== Sandman ===
The Sandman is an alien monster made of sand that first appeared in Journey into Mystery #70 and was created by Jack Kirby. It is not to be confused with the supervillain of the same name.

The Sandman is an alien who was previously sealed in a cave by tribesmen who mistook it for an evil spirit. In the early 1960s, Marine soldier Steve Bronson and his family accidentally release the Sandman while on vacation. However, Steve's son Bobby immobilizes the Sandman by pouring water on it, after which it is taken into military custody.

=== Skreeal ===
Skreel is a moth monster that first appeared in Fantastic Four #347 and was created by Walt Simonson.

Skreel is a giant moth monster that resides on Monster Isle and is named after the sounds it makes.

=== Sporr ===
Sporr is a giant amoeba monster that first appeared in Tales of Suspense #11 and was created by Stan Lee and Jack Kirby. It was created by a scientist who moved into Victor Frankenstein's castle and used a growth ray on a regular amoeba.

==== Sporr in other media ====
Sporr appears in Hulk: Where Monsters Dwell, with vocal effects provided by Jon Olson.

=== Thing that Crawled By Night ===
The Thing that Crawled by Night is a giant plant monster that first appeared in Tales of Suspense #26 and was created by Stan Lee and Jack Kirby.

=== Tim Boo Ba ===
Tim Boo Ba first appeared in Amazing Adult Fantasy #9 (Feb. 1962). His story was later republished with entirely new illustrations in Silver Surfer #4 (Feb. 1968).

Tim Boo Ba is a reptilian humanoid from the microscopic planet Devoktos, and together with an army of mercenaries he decides to conquer the Microverse. Despite initial success, Tim and his forces are wiped out by a flood, which is revealed to be a drop of water from the considerably larger Earth-616.

Tim Boo Ba survives and years later tricks fellow monster Googam into using the scientific equipment of Mister Fantastic to enlarge him. Tim uses the equipment to grow to giant proportions, but is eventually stopped by Googam, Elektro, Gorgilla and Fin Fang Foom.

=== Titan ===
Titan is an Atleantean beast who first appeared in Tales of Suspense #28.

Titan is a giant sea monster that claims that it came from Atlantis.

=== Torg ===
Torg the Abominable Snow-King is a giant sea-dwelling ape-like monster who first appeared in Sub-Mariner #55 and was created by Bill Everett.

Torg's origins are unknown, as he claims that nobody knows his beginning or end. He caused trouble in the waters near Antarctica which attracted the attention of Namor, who managed to defeat him with a block of ice.

==== Torg in other media ====
- Torg appears in the Moon Girl and Devil Dinosaur episode "Devil on Her Shoulder", voiced by Method Man.
- Torg appears as a boss in Lego Marvel Super Heroes 2.

=== Trull the Unhuman ===
Trull the Unhuman is a non-corporal alien who first appeared in Tales to Astonish #21 and was created by Stan Lee and Jack Kirby.

When Trull's ship had crashed, his physical body was destroyed. His essence survived and had possessed a construction crew's steam shovel that was designed by a man named Phil. Trull went on a rampage upon holding Phil, his ex-girlfriend, her new boyfriend, and the construction foreman hostage. This lasted until an elephant that Phil freed earlier defeated it by cracking its body. Trull's essence escaped into the jungle.

During the Civil War II storyline, Trull the Unhuman resurfaced in a new steam shovel body where he vandalized Damage Control's equipment until he got busted by Damage Control worker Monstro. Trull is convinced to give up on his goals and joins Damage Control as a spokesperson.

=== Two-Headed Thing ===
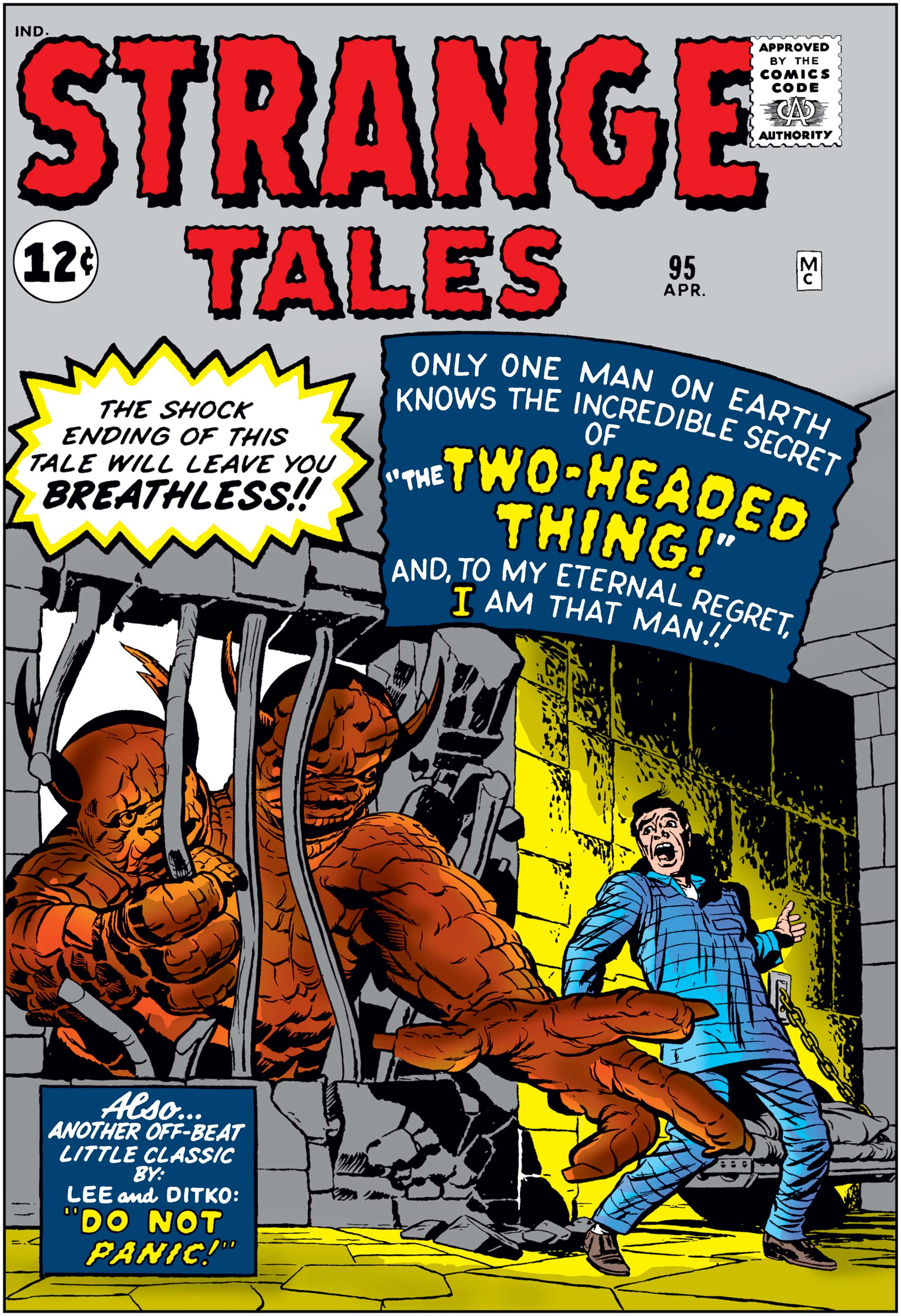
The Two-Headed Thing on the cover of Strange Tales #95

The Two-Headed Thing is a giant monster with two heads that first appeared in Strange Tales #95 and was created by Stan Lee, Jack Kirby, and Dick Ayers.

The Two-Headed Thing is an orange two-headed rock monster with super-strength and shapeshifting abilities.

=== Ulvar ===
Ulvar is a giant alien that first appeared in Journey into Mystery #63.

Ulvar was a giant alien from Centaurus II that challenged Gigantus's supremacy. After Gigantus retreated, it turned out that Ulvar was a prop built by Mr. Baxter and Charlie to fool Gigantus.

=== Vandoom's Monster ===
Vandoom's Monster is a wax monster that first appeared in Tales to Astonish #17 and was created by Stan Lee, Jack Kirby, and Dick Ayers.

Ludwig Vandoom created a wax sculpture of a giant monster to improve his failing wax museum. The wax sculpture came to life upon being struck by lightning from a freak thunderstorm.

=== Warlord Kaa ===
Warlord Kaa is a giant shadow monster who first appeared in Strange Tales #79 and was created by Stan Lee and Jack Kirby.

Warlord Kaa is the leader of the Shadow Realm. He led his fellow shadow monsters into invading Earth until a mystery writer named Phillip Lawrence found out and alerted the United Nations of their invasion. The shadow monsters were captured, but Warlord Kaa escaped leaving a message in the sky vowing to return and succeed next time.

=== Xemnu ===
Xemnu the Living Titan
- Cover of Journey into Mystery #62, the first appearance of Xemnu

Publication information
- Publisher: Marvel Comics
- First appearance: Journey into Mystery #62 (Nov. 1960)
- Created by: Stan Lee (writer); Jack Kirby (artist)

In-story information
- Alter ego: Xemnu
- Species: Unknown extraterrestrial
- Notable aliases: Xemnu the Living Hulk; Richmond Wagner; Amos Moses
- Abilities: Superhuman strength, stamina, durability, and intelligence; Psionic powers; Hypnosis; Self-recreation; Mastery of robotics, cybernetics, and aerospace engineering

Xemnu, also known as the Living Titan and the Living Hulk, is a fictional character appearing in American comic books published by Marvel Comics. Xemnu is an alien who has attempted to conquer Earth several times. The character first appeared in the story "I Was a Slave of the Living Hulk!" in Journey into Mystery #62, and was created by Stan Lee and Jack Kirby.

Xemnu initially battles the human Joe Harper, whom he controls in an attempt to control all other humans. In later appearances, he becomes an enemy of the Hulk.

==== Xemnu in other media ====
- Xemnu appears in the Hulk and the Agents of S.M.A.S.H. episode "The Strongest One There Is", voiced by Fred Tatasciore. This version is an undefeated galactic fighting champion who seeks a proper challenge. After coming to Earth and battling the Agents of S.M.A.S.H., Xemnu declares his journey to be over and befriends the group, giving his belt to A-Bomb.
- The Scientology figure Xenu is speculated to be inspired by Xemnu.

=== Yetrigar ===
- Further reading: Yetrigar at the Comic Book DB (archived from the original)

Yetrigar is a Sasquatch-like being created by writer Doug Moench and artist Herb Trimpe as an adversary for Godzilla in Marvel Comics. He first appeared in Godzilla #10, where he had grown to gargantuan proportions due to being exposed to radiation. His name comes from the legendary shaggy men that some believe live in the Japanese mountains.

=== Zetora ===
Zetora is a giant monstrous Martian that first appeared in Journey into Mystery #57 and was created by Jack Kirby and Dick Ayers.

Zetora was a giant Martian criminal who fled to Earth after committing a crime on Mars.

=== Zzutak ===
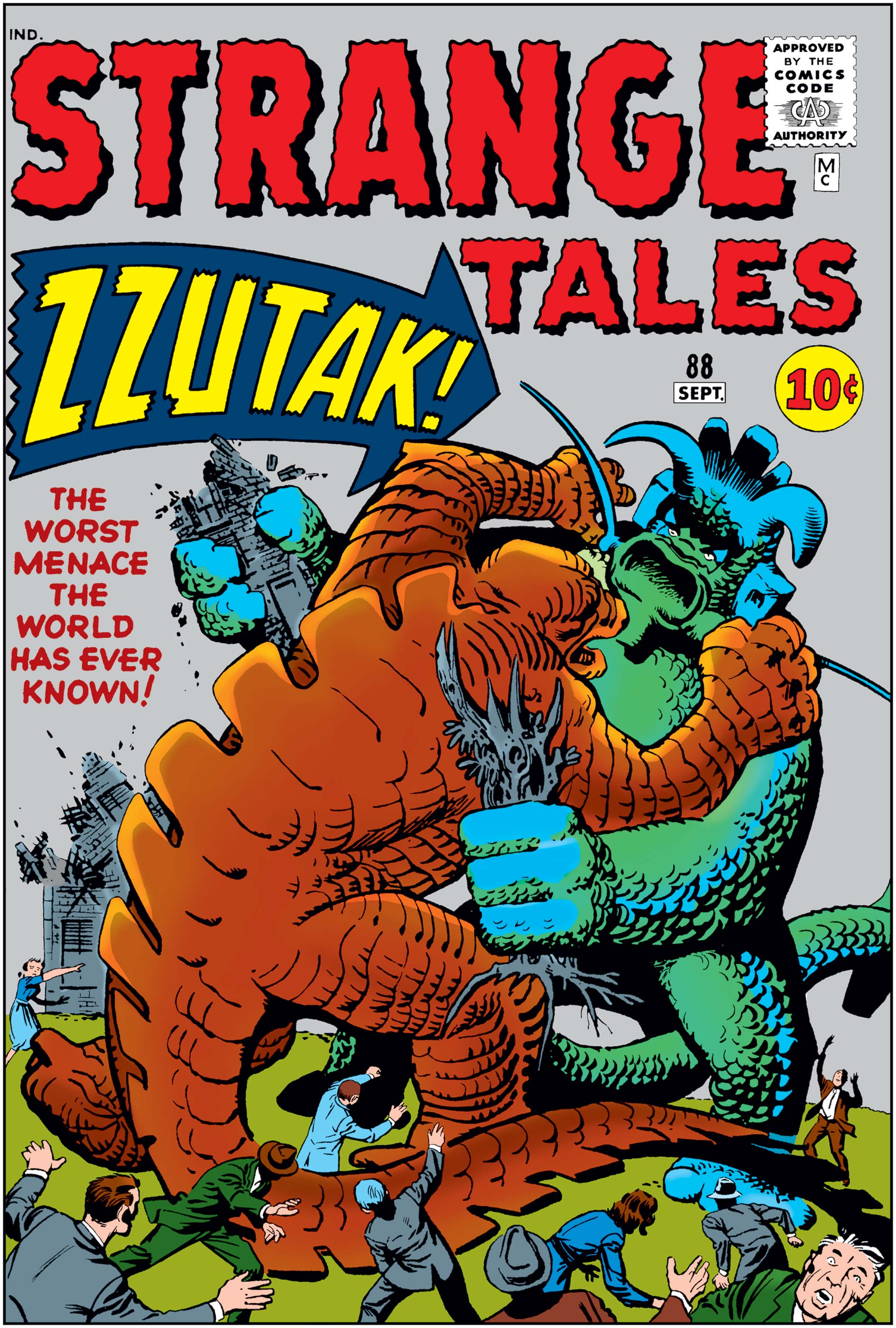
Zzutak on the cover of Strange Tales #88

Zzutak is a giant monster that first appeared in Strange Tales #88 and was created by Stan Lee, Jack Kirby, and Steve Ditko.

Zzutak is an orange monster that was created by comic book illustrator Frank Johnson after he was manipulated by an Aztec tribe.

==== Zzutak in other media ====
Zzutak appears in Hulk: Where Monsters Dwell, with vocal effects provided by Jon Olson.
