= Warwolf (Marvel Comics) =

- The Vince Marcus incarnation of Warwolf as depicted in Nick Fury's Howling Commandos #1 (December 2005). Art by Eduardo Francisco and Kris Justice.

Publication information
- Publisher: Marvel Comics
- First appearance: Cybertek: Deathlok (vol. 2) #1 (July 1991); Marcus: Nick Fury's Howling Commandos #1 (December 2005); Reyna: S.H.I.E.L.D. #9 (August 2015)
- Created by: Cybertek: Dwayne McDuffie, Gregory Wright, Denys Cowan, Mike Manley; Marcus: Richard Buckler; Reyna: Al Ewing, Stefano Caselli

In-story information
- Alter ego: Vince "Vic" Marcus; Martin Reyna; Simon Ryker
- Species: Werewolf
- Team affiliations: S.H.I.E.L.D.; Howling Commandos; S.T.A.K.E
- Abilities: In human form: Long lifespan In werewolf form: Superhuman strength, reaction time, durability, and endurance Enhanced speed, and senses Powerful claws and fangs Wields dagger and energy pistol

Warwolf is the name of several fictional characters appearing in American comic books published by Marvel Comics. The first was a one-time enemy of Deathlok, while the second and third, Vince Marcus and Martin Reyna, are werewolves and members of S.H.I.E.L.D.

== Publication history ==
The Cybertek incarnation of Warwolf first appeared in Deathlok (vol. 2) #1 and was created by Dwayne McDuffie, Gregory Wright, Denys Cowan, and Mike Manley.

The Vince Marcus incarnation of Warwolf first appeared in Nick Fury’s Howling Commandos #1 and was created by Richard Buckler.

The Martin Reyna incarnation of Warwolf first appeared in S.H.I.E.L.D. (vol. 3) #9 and was created by Al Ewing and Stefano Caselli.

== Fictional character biography ==
=== Cybertek version ===
Warwolf was created by Billy Hansen and others at Cybertek Systems Inc., a cybernetic research division of Roxxon, by placing a wolf's brain in a cyborg body. While in prison, Roxxon employee Harlan Ryker remotely activates Warwolf and sends it to attack his superiors, who may testify against him for the creation of Deathlok. Warwolf kills Billy Hansen before breaking into an NSA facility, where it destroys all records pertaining to Ryker's investigation. When Deathlok infiltrates the Danbury prison to confront Harlan Ryker, Warwolf appears and targets Cybertek's account manager John Rozum. However, Deathlok saves Rozum and incapacitates Warwolf. Deathlok euthanizes Warwolf after learning that it is undergoing a system failure and that its organic components will fail in six hours.

=== Vince Marcus ===
Vince Marcus is a member of S.H.I.E.L.D.'s Howling Commandos Monster Force. He infiltrated the Lords of Lightning cult and led an attack on Stonehenge when Merlin threatened to invade Earth.

=== Martin Reyna ===
Martin Reyna is a S.H.I.E.L.D. agent and the head of Area 13's S.T.A.K.E. (short for Special Threat Assessment for Known Extranormalities), a division that deals with supernatural events. Reyna also works with Dr. Paul Kraye on secret projects, which he fears will be discovered by Dum Dum Dugan. Both decide that they have to get rid of Dugan before he discovers them. Reyna later becomes the head of the Howling Commandos.

=== Simon Ryker ===
After surviving a Doombot attack, Simon Ryker encounters Thunderbolt Ross at Project Alpha and now possesses the ability to become a Warwolf.

== Powers and abilities ==
The Cybertek incarnation of Warwolf possesses immense strength, durability, and speed, being able to run at 317 mph. It also has eye socket-mounted plasma projectors that release highly destructive beams, but leave it blind when in use and can overload if overused.

The Vince Marcus and Martin Reyna incarnations of Warwolf are werewolves who possess superhuman strength, durability, and senses. Marcus' transformations are tied to Mars rather than the Moon, while Reyna can transform at will.

== Other versions ==
An original incarnation of Warwolf from Earth-7484 appears in Astonishing Tales. This version is a cybernetic werewolf created by Simon Ryker from an unidentified human. It battles Deathlok, who ultimately kills it.

== In other media ==
- The Martin Reyna incarnation of Warwolf appears in Hulk: Where Monsters Dwell, voiced by Edward Bosco. This version is a member of the Howling Commandos.
- The Vince Marcus incarnation of Warwolf appears as a playable character in Marvel: Future Fight.
