= Kaecilius =

Marvel Comics fictional character

- Kaecilius as depicted in Valkyrie: Jane Foster #4 (October 2019). Art by Jesus Aburtov.

Publication information
- Publisher: Marvel Comics
- First appearance: Strange Tales #130 (March 1965)
- Created by: Stan Lee; Steve Ditko

In-story information
- Species: Human
- Partnerships: Dormammu; Baron Mordo
- Notable aliases: Joe Crocker
- Abilities: Mastery of dark magic; Skilled martial artist

Kaecilius (/kaɪˈsɪliəs/) is a supervillain appearing in American comic books published by Marvel Comics, primarily as an enemy of Doctor Strange. The character first appeared in Strange Tales #130 (March 1965) and was created by Stan Lee and Steve Ditko.

Kaecilius made his live-action debut in the Marvel Cinematic Universe film Doctor Strange, portrayed by Mads Mikkelsen.

== Publication history ==
Kaecilius first appeared in Strange Tales #130 (March 1965), and was created by Stan Lee and Steve Ditko. He appeared in several subsequent issues of Strange Tales, ranging from issue #131 (April 1965) to issue #143 (April 1966). Kaecilius also appeared in Doctor Strange #56 (1974), the 2019 series Valkyrie: Jane Foster #4 (2019), the 2021 series Death of Doctor Strange, and the 2023 series G.O.D.S.

== Fictional character biography ==
Kaecilius is a disciple of Baron Mordo who delivers messages for him and even fights Doctor Strange himself if necessary. While battling Strange, Kaecilius successfully steals the Cloak of Levitation. However, by the end of the battle, Strange uses his powers to erase Kaecilius' knowledge of magic from his mind.

Kaecilius and his cohorts, Adria and Demonicus, pose as members of the Independent Video media network to interview Doctor Strange as a ploy to gain access to the Sanctum Sanctorum. After being exposed, Adria attempts to use a powerful gem against Strange, but only manages to banish herself, Kaecilius, and Demonicus to the Purple Dimension.

Many years later, the three are freed from the Purple Dimension and battle Doctor Strange as well as Jane Foster in her new identity as Valkyrie. Kaecilius displays vastly improved abilities and a modified appearance with darkened eyes. During the battle, Grim Reaper appears, having been newly empowered by Mephisto, and traps Doctor Strange's astral form in a mirror. Scared and surrounded by his defeated comrades, Kaecilius flees to Paris. During the "Death of Doctor Strange" storyline, Kaecilius accompanies Baron Mordo into heading to the Sanctum Sanctorum, where Doctor Strange is found dead. Wong accuses Mordo of killing Doctor Strange, which he denies. Just then, a classic version of Doctor Strange arrives, having sensed that the worst has happened. This version of Strange is revealed to be a temporal remnant who was created years prior by the original Strange to avenge him in the event of his death. The remnant was created by Strange severing a week of his life, meaning that he will only live for a week. After deducing that Kaecilius had killed the original Strange, the Strange remnant uses Kaecilius as a base for a spell that resurrects Strange, killing Kaecilius in the process.

== Powers and abilities ==
Kaecilius was trained in the mystic arts by his master, Baron Mordo.

== In other media ==
=== Marvel Cinematic Universe ===
Kaecilius appears in media set in the Marvel Cinematic Universe (MCU):

- Kaecilius appears in Doctor Strange, portrayed by Mads Mikkelsen. A combination of several villains from the comics, Kaecilius was used in the film to drive the introduction and development of bigger villains for the future, including Dormammu and "certain individuals who live in other dimensions". This version was motivated to become a Master of the Mystic Arts after the death of his family, and became disillusioned with what he considered the Ancient One's hypocrisy, subsequently choosing to serve Dormammu by using the same life-extending ritual his former master used to channel the Dark Dimension's energy. Believing in Dormammu's promise of eternal life, Kaecilius and his zealot followers destroy the Masters of the Mystic Arts' Sanctums to allow the Dark Dimension to consume Earth. However, Doctor Strange convinces Dormammu to renounce his attack on Earth, after which Dormammu drags Kaecilius and his followers into the Dark Dimension.
- An alternate universe variant of Kaecilius appears in the What If...? episode "What If... Howard the Duck Got Hitched?", voiced by Jared Butler.

=== Video games ===
- Kaecilius appears in Marvel: Future Fight.
- Kaecilius appears in Marvel Avengers Academy.
- Kaecilius appears as a boss in Marvel Puzzle Quest.
