= Umar (Marvel Comics) =

Marvel Universe character

- Umar, taken from a panel of Strange Tales #150 (November 1966); Art by Bill Everett

Publication information
- Publisher: Marvel Comics
- First appearance: Strange Tales #150 (November 1966)
- Created by: Roy Thomas (writer); Bill Everett (artist)

In-story information
- Species: Faltine
- Team affiliations: Lords of the Splinter Realms
- Partnerships: Dormammu
- Notable aliases: Umar the Unrelenting
- Abilities: Superhuman strength stamina, and durability; Immortality; Expertise in mysticism

Umar (/ˈuːmər/) is a supervillain appearing in publications by the American publisher Marvel Comics. The character usually appears in stories featuring Doctor Strange, for whom she serves as an adversary. Created by writer Roy Thomas and artist Bill Everett, the character first appeared in Strange Tales #150 (November 1966).

A resident of the "Dark Dimension" of the Marvel Comics multiverse, Umar is a Faltine, a higher-dimensional energy being trapped in human form. She is the sister of Dormammu, a major adversary of Doctor Strange, and the mother of Clea, through which she has served as recurring enemy of Strange herself. Her powers have been depicted as exceeding those of Earth's sorcerers, including Strange, making defeating her very difficult. Umar and Dormammu have been historically depicted in a constant battle over the throne of the Dark Dimension, a mystical realm to which they had initially been banished by their people, over which Dormammu typically rules, whereas Umar is usually depicted in a form resembling a human woman.

One of Doctor Strange's "most iconic villains", the character has been described as "an unpredictable threat", and "a constantly plotting, wicked woman that would do anything, including betraying her own nigh-omnipotent brother for power". She is noted for her more cool-headed use of "guile and malevolent intelligence".

== Publication history ==
Enter Umar! Art by Bill Everett (1966).

Umar first appeared in Marvel Comics' Strange Tales #150, in a Doctor Strange story written by Roy Thomas, and illustrated by Bill Everett under the editorial eye of Stan Lee. In the final panel of the previous month's Strange Tales #149 (written by Dennis O'Neil), however, her debut appearance was foreshadowed under a different name.

NEXT MONTH... The dramatic defeat of Kaluu -- and the introduction of the intriguing and totally unforgettable villainess of all time -- KARA Can you afford to miss it!

The cover of #150, however, ran the teaser "Exit Kaluu... enter Umar!" with her initial rendering. Appearing within on the final (tenth) page, Umar then spends most of issue #151 as a narrative tool, recapping the events which occurred during her banishment, for the benefit of the returning and new readers alike.

She has served as a major adversary Earth's Sorcerer Supreme, Doctor Strange. Her family ties would lead her to cross paths with Doctor Strange many times during the course of her publication history, during which she would work with her brother against Strange, and was not above exploiting Strange's romantic relationship with Clea to manipulate the sorcerer.

In 2005 Marvel published the miniseries Defenders: Indefensible, by Keith Giffen, J. M. DeMatteis, and Kevin Maguire, in which the Defenders reunited to confront Umar and Dormammu.

In The Defenders (vol. 2) #3 (November 2005), Umar uses her magic to enchant the Hulk in order to seduce him and take advantage of him sexually, but is frustrated that the act of copulation with him lasts only six minutes, and angered when he reverts to his human form of Bruce Banner. The scene that drew criticism for its treatment of what was an act of non-consensual sex.

Umar later uses this tactic again in The Incredible Hulks #633 (September 2011).

== Fictional character biography ==
=== Origins ===
Umar was born a Faltine, a race of immortal beings made of pure magical energy that reside in their own universe. Umar is the daughter of Sinifer and the sister of Dormammu, who is usually depicted in a demonic form. When Faltine spawn, they usually take the duplicate form of their parents, but she and her brother Dormammu expressed individual distinctiveness from their parents. After they murder one of their fellow Faltines, they are banished from that universe.

They escaped this banishment, and later conquered the Faltine and the Dark Dimension, which they subsequently ruled with iron fists, expanding their power bases while keeping the Mindless Ones out of that dimension. Although the siblings conquer the Dark Dimension together, battling that realm's defenders weakens Umar, who is relegated to the status of Dormammu's subordinate, and is forced to take the form of a mortal body. Umar meets the disciple of Dormammu named Orini, with whom she bears a daughter named Clea, but Umar immediately becomes disgusted and disdainful of Orini. Clea apparently spends most of her childhood essentially parentless, and would not discover that Umar was her mother until she is an adult.

Umar grows frustrated with her status in exile, and after discovering she can return to her original form, she attacks her brother in rage, but he easily defeats and banishes her to a pocket world within the Dark Dimension. When Doctor Strange later defeats Dormammu during a subsequent encounter, Umar is freed from her exile and takes control of the Dark Dimension, but her rule is temporary. She later comes into conflict with Strange and his allies on her own in many storylines.

=== The Dark Dimension ===
Besides being an unpredictable threat to Doctor Strange, Umar also paves the way for her daughter Clea who becomes a love interest for Strange. Umar has used her daughter as a hostage before to lure Strange into her traps, and conversely, Clea has teamed up with Strange to defeat her mother and knock her off the throne.

In Strange Tales #156, Strange is narrowly able to defeat Umar only by summoning Zom, the one entity whose strength rivals her own, though doing this presents a different set of hazards, that Strange survives only with the intervention of the Living Tribunal.

=== Clea ===
One of the Mhuruuks who was not slain was Orini, son of Olnar, being just an untrained boy. In time he aged, while the Faltinians remained the same. Eventually Orini became the chief disciple of Dormammu. In time Umar noticed the adult Orini, and had a tryst with him. Both evidently were virgins, and Umar was initially disgusted with the experience and with Orini himself (she later became a skilled seductor, but her disdain for Orini remained unchanged). In six cycles of the Dark Dimension, Umar gave birth to Clea. This experience changed Umar, and she now was no longer able to return to her Faltinian form.

Her inability to transform angered Umar, and in her frustration she lashed out at Dormammu. Now far stronger than Umar, Dormammu banished her to one of the subjugated pocket dimensions of the Dark Dimension.

=== Versus Dr. Strange ===
In time, Dormammu tried to invade Earth's dimension and came into conflict with first the Ancient One, and then Doctor Strange. Eventually Dormammu was defeated, and the spell banishing Umar was broken. Umar was able to stop the invasion of the Dark Dimension by the Mindless Ones, and became ruler of the Dark Dimension. Despite having been banished by him, Umar sought to avenge her brother on Strange. She held Clea hostage in the Dark Dimension, to lure Strange back in. When she first fought Strange, she was the more powerful, but then the entity called Sayge showed Umar an image of Umar's original Faltinian visage. This sight drove Umar almost to madness, and she traveled to Earth to destroy it in revenge. There, she battled the Ancient One. Strange defeated her by summoning another monster; Zom, forcing her to flee. Umar later freed Doctor Strange, enabling him to defeat Dormammu.

Umar attacked Doctor Strange and Clea on Earth, and transported the essence of Dormammu to Earth's core, where he reformed. With Orini, Umar defeated Doctor Strange on Dormammu's behalf. With Dormammu, Umar battled the Scarlet Witch, Vision, and Agatha Harkness. Umar's seduction of Orini resulting in the birth of Clea was then recounted. Umar stole Dormammu's power, using it to battle Doctor Strange and Clea. Umar was defeated when Gaea caused Dormammu's power to return to him. Umar later battled Thor in an attempt to disrupt a chess match between Odin and Dormammu.

Umar later intervened in Doctor Strange's battle with a deranged Black Knight. She conjured a sea serpent and water elementals to attack Doctor Strange and the Black Knight on Earth. Umar's origin was finally recounted, and the secret of Clea's parentage was finally revealed to Clea and Doctor Strange. Umar was then deposed as ruler of the Dark Dimension by Clea, and with Orini, Umar was banished to an alien dimension by Doctor Strange and Clea.

Dormammu returned to overthrow Clea, and freed Umar from banishment. Clea and Doctor Strange escaped Dormammu, but met with Umar, who wanted to kill Doctor Strange. Umar noticed that her spell was also affecting Clea. Clea revealed that they had been married and that there now was a mystical link between them. Umar stopped her attack and admitted to Clea that she was unable to kill her own daughter. She assisted Strange and Clea in overthrowing Dormammu. Umar tricked her brother by suggesting that they divide the rulership over the Dark Dimension into two parts. Dormammu agreed and Umar banished him to his part: the domain of the Mindless Ones. Umar made peace with Strange and Clea and would now rule the Dark Dimension with Baron Mordo at her side. Clea returned to Earth with Strange.

Many months later, Clea was approached by another Faltine, who claimed to be her cousin. He informed her that she needed to defeat Umar, who had turned into a dictator. Clea returned, but found out that it was a trick: the other Faltine was Dormammu in disguise and he absorbed Umar and Mordo into his own body, growing gigantic in size and power. Clea remained in the Dark Dimension to battle Dormammu.

Umar was separated from Dormammu again, although the siblings retained a mystic link, and the two collaborated in defeating an avatar of Eternity, and using the acquired power to remake the universe in their hellish image, but she eventually betrayed her brother, stole his power, and trapped him in the form of a powerless crippled mutate.

When Dormammu's minion, the criminal gang leader known as Hood questions Satana to learn about his master, the demoness refers to Umar as having been killed by her brother.

Umar is later resurrected along with other villains by the magic of the Wishing Well.

During the "Death of Doctor Strange" storyline, Umar manifested part of her kingdom in Antarctica. Clea later mentioned to Classic Doctor Strange and those present that Umar and the other inter-dimensional warlords are fleeing from the Three Mothers.

== Powers and abilities ==
Umar possesses supernatural strength, stamina, and durability, as well as virtual immortality (even in her humanoid form). Like her brother Dormammu, Umar's magical powers greatly exceed those of all sorcerers from Earth, including Doctor Strange.

== Critical reception ==
Umar has been ranked among the most significant enemies of Doctor Strange, and is also considered one of the "classic" enemies of the Hulk. Chase Magnett of ComicBook.com placed her as the fourth best Doctor Strange villain described her as similar to her brother Dormammu but with more sympathy.

In July 2016, Cat Wyatt ranked Umar #10 on Comic Book Resources's list of "The 10 Worst Enemies Stephen Strange Has Ever Faced".

The scene in which Umar uses her magic to seduce the Hulk in Defenders (Vol 2) #3 (November 2005), only to be dissatisfied with his inability to copulate with her for more than six minutes, has been mentioned as among critics as a notable encounter between the two adversaries, with Anthony Avina, citing it for his inclusion of the pair's relationship in Comic Book Resources's 2019 list of the 10 Best Romances Between Heroes And Villains among Marvel characters. Others, however, criticized the scene. In 2013, Rob Bricken of Gizmodo who said that Umar's act was one of rape and ranked it #4 on that website's list of The 9 Least Incredible Adventures the Incredible Hulk Ever Had. In 2016, Screen Rant writer Mark Zambrano included it in that website's 2016 list of the 11 Biggest WTF Things The Hulk Has Ever Done. Another Screen Rant contributor, Nicholas Conley, ranked Umar's relationship with Hulk number 13 on that website's August 2017 list of the "15 Superheroes Who Had Supervillain Lovers".

In August 2016, a reader poll conducted by ComicsAlliance on the most memorable stories featuring the archenemeses of Dr. Strange included the reunion of the Defenders to confront Umar and Dormammu in the 2005 miniseries Defenders: Indefensible.

Umar had been advocated as an addition to the films of the Marvel Cinematic Universe (MCU) from before the release of the 2016 Doctor Strange feature film. The success of that film prompted speculation and suggestions on which villains should have been selected for that film's sequel. That November, Den of Geek! published a list of characters desired for the second Doctor Strange film. Contributor Marc Buxton included Umar, whom he named as the "nastiest" of Strange's enemies, comparing her to Cersei Lannister of the Song of Ice and Fire novel series. Buxton observed that while Dormammu represents raw power, Umar exhibits "guile and malevolent intelligence" and suggested that making her a film's antagonist would provide for an "epic" story. In March 2019, Ben Sherlock, writing for Comic Book Resources, included Umar in that website's list of "9 Powerful Doctor Strange Villains We Hope To See In The MCU". Sherlock argued that the use of Dormammu in the 2016 Dr. Strange film would make appearances by his sister easy. Sherlock suggested that Strange's defeat of Dormammu at the end of that film would provide a revenge motive for Umar, and might lend itself to a personal and more intimate conflict than the one in the 2016 film. Sherlock also pointed out that this would increase address the dearth of female villains in the series, and that setting such a story in an otherworldly realm would avoid the question that occurs in MCU solo movies of why the protagonists do not contact their Avengers allies for assistance. Other outlets have called for the introduction of Umar into the film series as well, including Digital Spy, and CinemaBlend, which stated that Umar's introduction would also provide an avenue for the introduction of Clea. That same year, Marvel Studios producer Kevin Feige stated that glimpses of the Dark Dimension would be a part of the plot to that sequel.

== In other media ==
Umar appears as a boss in Marvel: Avengers Alliance.
