= Raspoutine =

Raspoutine may refer to:

- Grigori Rasputin
- Rasputin (1954 film), a 1954 French-Italian historical drama film
- Raspoutine (2011 film), a Franco-Russian historical film

== See also ==
- Rasputin (disambiguation)
