= Clea Strange =

Fictional comic-book character

- Textless variant cover of Doctor Strange #6 (July 2023). Art by Derrick Chew.

Publication information
- Publisher: Marvel Comics
- First appearance: Unnamed: Strange Tales #126 (November 1964); As Clea: Strange Tales #146 (July 1966); As Clea Strange: Doctor Strange Vol. 3 #3 (February 1999)
- Created by: Stan Lee (writer); Steve Ditko (artist)

In-story information
- Full name: Clea Strange
- Species: Faltine hybrid
- Place of origin: Dark Dimension
- Team affiliations: New Avengers; Defenders
- Partnerships: Doctor Strange
- Abilities: Superhuman strength, stamina, and durability; Flight; Mastery of magic

Clea Strange (/ˈkliːə/) is a character appearing in American comic books published by Marvel Comics. Created by Stan Lee and Steve Ditko, Clea first appeared in the Doctor Strange feature in Strange Tales #126 (November 1964). She is a sorceress, the disciple, lover, and eventual wife of Doctor Stephen Strange, and his third successor as Sorcerer Supreme.

Clea is a human-appearing being and maternally related to the other-dimensional Faltine race of energy beings. The daughter of Umar and niece of the demonic tyrant Dormammu, Clea has been, sporadically, ruler of the Dark Dimension, the mystical realm to which Dormammu had been banished and that he subsequently conquered.

In 2022, she made her live-action debut in the Marvel Cinematic Universe (MCU) film Doctor Strange in the Multiverse of Madness, portrayed by Charlize Theron.

== Publication history ==
The character was introduced during a story arc in which Doctor Strange confronted Dormammu for the first time. Clea remained nameless for several issues, referred to only as the "captive female" or the "mysterious silver-haired girl". It was later noted that her father is Dormammu's closest disciple. Her name was revealed two years later.

Initially, nothing indicates that Clea and Umar are related or know each other. Dormammu's sister mimics her brother's tactics and goes after Clea as a way of hurting Strange. Later, it was revealed that Umar was her mother and that her father was Orini, a disciple of Dormammu and ruler of the Dark Dimension.

In 2004, Clea appeared in the Witches series along with Jennifer Kale, Satana, and Topaz.

Brian Michael Bendis has described Clea as: "… the mistress of the Dark Dimension and … Strange's ex-girlfriend/wife. She was trained by Strange, right there in his home. She was his prized pupil. She was to Strange what he was to the Ancient One [Strange's instructor in the mystic arts]. But as Mistress of the Dark Dimension, she hasn't been on this plane of existence a lot lately. And who's going to take her serious [sic] in those pants?"

Following the 2021 "Death of Doctor Strange" event, Clea becomes the official Sorcerer Supreme in her own solo series, Strange, written by Jed MacKay.

== Fictional character biography ==
Clea observed Doctor Strange in the Dark Dimension and was impressed by his courage. She warned Strange against facing Dormammu, and Dormammu punished her for her betrayal. Strange forced him to release her. She became Strange's only ally in the Dark Dimension and soon, a captive of her uncle.

Umar took Clea hostage and nearly killed her. The Ancient One sent Clea into a pocket dimension to save her from Umar. Clea was found and freed by Doctor Strange, and went to live on Earth with him.

Clea was later captured by Silver Dagger. Doctor Strange's spirit cohabited in her body so that they could defeat Silver Dagger. Umar then attacked Clea on Earth, and Clea battled her.

Clea helped save herself from being sacrificed by Dormammu and came to believe Morganna Blessing loved Strange more than she did. Clea and Strange later helped lead a rebellion in the Dark Dimension. Clea discovered that Umar was her mother, and Clea defeated Umar in a mystic battle. Clea revealed to the inhabitants of the Dark Dimension that her mother didn't care for her subjects at all and was willing to endanger them to defeat Clea. The population became convinced that Clea should be the ruler and the "Flames of Regency" appeared on Clea's head. The Flames of Regency made Clea powerful enough to defeat and banish Umar and her father Orini from the Dark Dimension, and Clea took the throne of the Dark Dimension.

Clea and Strange exchanged vows and became one according to the laws of the Dark Dimension. Several months later, Dormammu returned to the Dark Dimension and claimed the throne again. Clea was held hostage to lure in Doctor Strange, but Strange and Clea managed to escape Dormammu and arrived near Umar. Umar tried to kill Strange but found out that her spells hurt both Clea and Strange. Clea revealed to her mother that she had married Strange. Umar confessed that she didn't want to hurt her daughter and assisted Doctor Strange and Clea in defeating Dormammu. Umar and her new lover Baron Mordo claimed rulership over the Dark Dimension but promised Clea that they would not abuse their powers. Clea reluctantly agreed and returned to Earth with Strange.

Sometime later, the Faltinean Flyx appeared to her and told her that Umar and Mordo betrayed her trust. Clea and Flyx gathered an army to defeat Umar and Mordo, but Flyx revealed himself to be Dormammu in disguise. He absorbed the powers of Umar and Mordo and Clea remained in the Dark Dimension as leader of the resistance against Dormammu.

Doctor Strange told the Illuminati of how Clea left him to lead the rebellion in the Dark Dimension.

Clea returns and it is revealed that she has been hiding out in Odin's hall thanks to Valkyrie, who comes to ask a favor of her to restore the recently deceased Annabelle Riggs to life. After performing a spell to resurrect her, which causes Annabelle and Valkyrie to share a body, Clea leaves with them to possibly join the Defenders team.

During the "Death of Doctor Strange" storyline, Clea falls from a portal in the sky and is caught by a temporal remnant of Doctor Strange. Wong briefs her on what happened to Doctor Strange. Clea states that inter-dimensional warlords like Aggamon, Dagoth, Tiboro, and Umar are fleeing from the Three Mothers. When the Three Mothers arrive, Clea witnesses the Avengers' disastrous fight with them before the Three Mothers retreat vowing to come back for them later. Strange, Wong and Clea team up to defeat the Three Mothers, though Strange dies and bequeaths the title of Sorcerer Supreme to Clea. Doctor Doom arrives at the Sanctum and demands to know how Clea has become the Sorcerer Supreme through unconventional means, though Clea refuses to reveal the information. Against Wong's advice, Clea attempts to resurrect Strange.

== Powers and abilities ==
Clea is the Sorceress Supreme of the Dark Dimension, possessing vast powers involving the manipulation of the forces of magic for a variety of effects. She has exhibited such abilities as transmutation, forming and throwing magical bolts of concussive energy, magically constructed animate beings, conjuring objects and energies, teleporting, telekinesis, levitation, mesmerism, thought-casting, controlling others' minds, casting illusions, and the tapping of extra-dimensional energy by invoking entities or objects of power existing in dimensions tangential to Earth's through the recitation of spells. Presumably, she is capable of replicating any spell performed by her former mentor, Doctor Strange. As she is descended from the Faltine race of beings, it is suggested that she can generate her own mystical energy, like Umar and Dormammu, and draw upon it to fuel her magic. She also possesses greater strength and body density than that of a normal Earth human. Her age is indeterminate and the rate at which she ages is unknown since she has lived for centuries but has the form and demeanour of a twenty-year-old woman. Clea has defeated the Enchantress in single magical combat, and armed with the Flames of Regency, at the peak of her magical abilities, even rivaled her mother Umar in raw power.

Clea possesses a vast knowledge of magical lore through extensive studies of sorcery under Doctor Strange, who also trained her in hand-to-hand combat.

== Reception ==
=== Accolades ===
- In 2019, CBR.com ranked Clea 12th in their "21 Most Powerful Sorcerer Supreme Candidates" list.
- In 2020, Scary Mommy included Clea in their "195+ Marvel Female Characters Are Truly Heroic" list.
- In 2021, Looper included Clea in their "Marvel's Most Powerful Magic Users" list.
- In 2022, Screen Rant included Clea in their "15 Most Powerful Marvel Magic Users (Who Aren't Doctor Strange)" list.
- In 2022, CBR.com ranked Clea 3rd in their "10 Best Sorcerer Supremes" list and included her in their "10 Important Steve Ditko Creations For Marvel Besides Spider-Man" list.

== Literary reception ==
=== Volumes ===
==== Strange – 2022 ====
According to Diamond Comic Distributors, Strange #1 was the 7th best-selling comic book in March 2022.

Bishop V Navarro of WomenWriteAboutComics stated, "Strange #1 is an excellent start to a highly-promising title. Clea is a compelling character that doesn't feel one-dimensional–her near-arrogance is infectious and it's exciting to see her shut down Doctor Doom and leap into action. Near the end, she narrates her feelings about the loss of Stephen and how her origins as a Faltine from the Dark Dimension affect her desires to get him back. Although narration is no rare thing in comics, this one feels especially emphatic. This speech is her thesis statement and her oath, and her strong voice helps make her a stand-out character for Marvel." Hannah Rose of CBR.com wrote, "Grief and death are big topics in this issue, for both the protagonist and antagonist. While the big overarching threat is the survival of the world in the wake of the loss of their magical hero, both the hero and the villain are using Doctor Strange's role to cope with or deny his death. Under the veneer of gratuitous gore, explosions, and brutal spells, Strange #1 sets up a story arc with a surprisingly mature take on death and acceptance. Although it can careen straight into edge-lord territory, Strange #1 is an otherwise strong start to a far darker take on the Sorcerer Supreme and the power of love in the face of grief." Spencer Perry of ComicBook.com gave Strange #1 a grade of 4 out of 5, writing, "Jed MacKay and Marcelo Ferreira's new Strange series begins with a bang, literally, at least one on the door. The surprise that this creative team brings to the threshold of the Sanctum Sanctorum in these first pages cements this new series' place quite firmly in the Marvel Universe while also ensuring that we readers realize, "well, anything goes here, huh?". Readers that might not have dug into the "Death of Doctor Strange" event need not worry though as every piece of context you'll need is here, and it seems like there's a lot of unique decisions at play in Marvel Comics' Strange." Darby Harn of Screen Rant included the Strange comic book series in their "10 Best Clea Comics to Read After Doctor Strange in the Multiverse of Madness" list, asserting, "Doctor Strange's death left a major void in the Marvel Universe. Strange #1 ranks as one of Clea's best comics as she completes her journey as the disciple of Strange and becomes Sorcerer Supreme. She wields all the power, knowledge, and experience of her realm and Earth-616. Clea's immediate future remains unclear in the comics as she navigates a strange new world. This ascension for Clea potentially manifests in the MCU down the road, though the MCU Clea already seems to possess great power and skill."

== Other versions ==
- Clea of Earth-311 appears in Marvel 1602 as the wife of English court physician Dr Stephen Strange until his death, after which she returns to her world.
- Clea of Earth-X appears in the eponymous miniseries. This version is the lover of Loki, who helped her become Sorceress Supreme until Bruce Banner discovers what happened, leading to her being taken away by Thor and imprisoned in Asgard.
- Clea of an unspecified Earth appears in Strange (2005) as a babysitter for Doctor Strange.
- Clea of Earth-1610 appears in the Ultimate Marvel imprint as the ex-wife of Stephen Strange and mother of Stephen Strange Jr., whom she worked to keep away from magic, who lacks a magical background herself.

== In other media ==
=== Television ===
Clea makes a non-speaking cameo appearance in the X-Men: The Animated Series episode "Nightcrawler".

=== Film ===
- A character loosely based on Clea named Clea Lake appears in Dr. Strange, portrayed by Eddie Benton. She is a depicted as a patient of Doctor Strange who possesses no magical powers.
- Clea makes a cameo appearance in the mid-credits scene of Doctor Strange in the Multiverse of Madness (2022), portrayed by Charlize Theron.

=== Video games ===
- Clea appears as a non-playable character in Marvel: Ultimate Alliance, voiced by Marabina Jaimes.
- Clea appears in Marvel Heroes, voiced by Kari Wahlgren.
- Clea appears as a playable character in Marvel: Future Fight.
- Clea appears as a playable character in Lego Marvel Super Heroes 2.
