= Mindless Ones =

Marvel Comics fictional characters

- A Mindless One

Publication information
- Publisher: Marvel Comics
- First appearance: Strange Tales #127 (December 1964)
- Created by: Stan Lee (writer); Steve Ditko (artist)

Characteristics
- Place of origin: Dread Dimensions
- Inherent abilities: Superhuman strength, stamina, and durability; Energy projection

The Mindless Ones are fictional monsters appearing in American comic books published by Marvel Comics. Their first appearance was in Strange Tales #127 (Dec. 1964).

The Mindless Ones are extra-dimensional creatures who are summoned via magic to do the bidding of others and have no will of their own. They are commonly associated with Dormammu, who employs them as minions.

== Publication history ==
The Mindless Ones first appeared in Strange Tales #127 (Dec. 1964), and were created by Stan Lee and Steve Ditko.

The Mindless Ones have also appeared in Darkhawk #19-20 (Sept.–Oct. 1992), Sleepwalker #17 (Oct. 1992), Doctor Strange, Sorcerer Supreme #82 (Oct. 1995), Marvel Boy vol. 2, #5-6 (Dec. 2000, March 2001), Fantastic Four #70 (Aug. 2003), The Amazing Spider-Man vol. 2 #57-#58 (Nov. 2003), The Amazing Spider-Man #500 (Dec. 2003), and Nextwave: Agents of H.A.T.E. #7-8 (Nov. 2006), among other comics.

== Fictional history ==
Long ago, the wizard King Olnar sat on the throne of the Dark Dimension. He is visited by Umar and Dormammu, siblings of a race of magical energy beings called the Faltine. Olnar merges the Mindless Ones' home dimension with the Dark Dimension. They rampage throughout the lands, killing many, including Olnar, and almost killing Umar and Dormammu. The siblings create a barrier to keep them contained.

The Mindless Ones are most often seen in the employ of Dormammu, who develops a limited ability to control their actions. They have also been utilized by others such as Doctor Doom, Doctor Midas (in Marvel Boy) and a fellow Faltine named Rorkannu (in Nextwave: Agents of H.A.T.E.).

Doctor Doom uses them after gaining high levels of magical power via a deal with demonic entities. The Mindless Ones are utilized to beat on Ben Grimm, a member of the Fantastic Four, in a test of his durability.

When Spider-Man is banished to the Dark Dimension by a brainwashed Portal, he is attacked by a group of Mindless Ones. To rescue him, Darkhawk and Sleepwalker battle Toad's Brotherhood of Mutants and break Sauron's control over Portal so they could retrieve Spider-Man. A gang of Mindless Ones follow Spider-Man through the portal leading back to Earth, but the three heroes beat them back through the gateway, which is sealed by Portal.

In another separate incident, the Mindless Ones invade and destroy much of Times Square. A force that consists of Spider-Man, Doctor Strange, Cyclops, Thor, Iron Man, and the Fantastic Four help stop them, mainly by creating barriers. The Mindless Ones are temporarily defeated when Mister Fantastic creates a machine that manipulates their magical energy, drawing them back to where they came from. This, inadvertently summons Dormammu, who battles Doctor Strange. One of the Mindless Ones punches Spider-Man, displacing him in time. After Spider-Man returns to the present, Strange banishes the Mindless Ones, leaving Times Square damaged but intact.

Rorkannu, who physically resembles Dormammu and claims to be lord of the Dark Dimension, is stated to control a group of Mindless Ones. Emerging from a portal in a public restroom, they rampage through a small Colorado town, killing everyone they see, then wearing their clothing and behaving like them.

The group known as Nextwave kills many of the Mindless Ones. Rorkannu, in a monologue, reveals he is summoning the army because he feels their lack of distinguishing features and similar temperaments make them suitable to replace the human race. His lair is discovered by the hero known as the 'Captain'. His summoning circle is destroyed. Rorkannu is severely beaten and left to an uncertain fate.

The Mindless Ones appeared in an issue of Cable & Deadpool in which Deadpool and Bob, Agent of Hydra encounter them in their own dimension. The two are being manipulated by Doctor Strange. The Mindless Ones alternately attack and worship the two protagonists, evidently mistaking the light from a glow stick for a magical power and revering whoever it seemed to be emanating from. Deadpool and Bob end up causing the deaths of several Mindless Ones as a needed sacrifice to close down a magical catastrophe threatening innocent lives.

Plokta, a Duke of Hell, decides to conquer the world exponentially from a tower block in Birmingham. He used the collected magical energy of people captured within its rooms to create an army of Mindless Ones, but was eventually stopped by Captain Britain and MI13. Plokta is revealed to be the original creator of the Mindless Ones and was responsible for them within the hierarchy of Hell.

The Mindless Ones are used to mine Neutron Stars and many other ultra-dense gravity sites. They rebelled against their slave masters and began manufacturing a drug called "Krush" from the surface of Neutron Stars. They are members of the Black Hole Sons and it seems they are led by a being called The Mind who is currently held prisoner in a Nova Corps ship.

During the "Original Sin"' storyline, a Mindless One was wrecking New York and smacking the Thing around. Spider-Man shows up to give Thing a hand. Spider-Man recognizes the Mindless One and realizes that they are not supposed to be telepathic. The Mindless One screams in agony over the things he has seen and the things he has done. Thing realizes he is wielding the Ultimate Nullifier and tries to talk the Mindless One down. However, it does not work and the Mindless shoots himself with it. By this time, Nick Fury and the Avengers arrive. Captain America wants the Ultimate Nullifier left alone until it is contained and Fury declares the battle zone a murder scene. Elsewhere, a group of villains realize the other Mindless Ones are evolving.

Doctor Strange later encountered a Mindless One known as the Mindful One. It is a servant of Isaac Newton, who enhanced it to serve him. After some adventures, the Mindful One moves in with Doctor Strange. In Strange Academy, the Mindful One and several sentient Mindless Ones join the eponymous academy as teachers.

== Powers and abilities ==
The Mindless Ones are capable of firing energy blasts from their eyes. They are superhumanly strong and durable, although their exact power levels vary between appearances.

== In other media ==
=== Television ===
- The Mindless Ones appear in The Super Hero Squad Show episode "Enter Dormammu".
- The Mindless Ones appear in Hulk and the Agents of S.M.A.S.H..
- The Mindless Ones appear in the Ultimate Spider-Man episode "Cloak and Dagger".
- The Mindless Ones appear in Avengers Assemble.

=== Video games ===
The Mindless Ones appear in Marvel: Avengers Alliance.
