= Doctor Strange =

Marvel Comics fictional character

- Textless cover of Doctor Strange vol. 4 #2 by Alex Ross (January 2016)

Publication information
- Publisher: Marvel Comics
- First appearance: Strange Tales #110 (July 1963)
- Created by: Steve Ditko (writer/artist)

In-story information
- Full name: Stephen Vincent Strange
- Species: Human
- Team affiliations: Avengers; Defenders; Illuminati; Infinity Watch; Midnight Sons; New Avengers; The Order
- Partnerships: Clea; Wong; Ancient One
- Notable aliases: Master of the Mystic Arts; Master of Black Magic; Sorcerer Supreme; Strange; Stephen Sanders; Captain Universe; Vincent Stevens; Void
- Abilities: Mastery of magic and martial arts; Mystical equipment usage; Genius-level intellect

Doctor Strange is a superhero appearing in American comic books published by Marvel Comics. Created by artist Steve Ditko with scripting by Stan Lee, the character first appeared in Strange Tales #110 (cover dated July 1963). Doctor Strange serves as the Sorcerer Supreme, the primary protector of the Earth dimension against magical and mystical threats. Doctor Strange was introduced during the Silver Age of Comic Books in an attempt to bring a different kind of character and themes of mysticism to Marvel Comics.

Dr. Stephen Vincent Strange starts as an intelligent and arrogant neurosurgeon who is injured in a car accident. Because his hands had suffered severe nerve damage from the accident, he was told that current medical therapy and rehabilitation would not be enough to enable him to practice again as a surgeon. Unable to accept this prognosis, he travels the world searching for alternative ways of healing, which leads him to the Ancient One, the Sorcerer Supreme. Strange becomes his student and learns to be a master of the mystical arts. He acquires an assortment of mystical objects, including the powerful Eye of Agamotto and Cloak of Levitation, and takes up residence in the Sanctum Sanctorum. Strange assumes the title of Sorcerer Supreme and, with his friend and valet Wong, defends the world from mystical threats.

In live-action adaptations, the character was first portrayed by Peter Hooten in the 1978 television film Dr. Strange. Since 2016, Benedict Cumberbatch has portrayed the role of Stephen Strange in the Marvel Cinematic Universe.

== Publication history ==
=== Creation ===
Artist Steve Ditko and writer Stan Lee have described the character as having been originally the idea of Ditko, who wrote in 2008, "On my own, I brought in to Lee a five-page, penciled story with a page/panel script of my idea of a new, different kind of character for variety in Marvel Comics. My character wound up being named Dr. Strange because he would appear in Strange Tales." In a 1963 letter to Jerry Bails, Lee called the character Ditko's idea, saying:

Well, we have a new character in the works for Strange Tales (just a 5-page filler named Dr. Strange) Steve Ditko is gonna draw him. It has sort of a black magic theme. The first story is nothing great, but perhaps we can make something of him-- 'twas Steve's idea and I figured we'd give it a chance, although again, we had to rush the first one too much. Little sidelight: Originally decided to call him Mr. Strange, but thought the "Mr." bit too similar to Mister Fantastic -- now, however, I remember we had a villain called Dr. Strange just recently in one of our mags, hope it won't be too confusing!

=== Early years ===
Doctor Strange debuted in Strange Tales #110 (July 1963), a split book shared at the time with the feature "The Human Torch" and later with the feature "Nick Fury, Agent of S.H.I.E.L.D." Doctor Strange appeared in issues #110–111 and #114 before the character's eight-page origin story in #115 (December 1963). His origin was later retold in Doctor Strange #169 (February 1968). Scripter Lee's take on the character was inspired by the Chandu the Magician radio program that aired on the Mutual Broadcasting System in the 1930s. He had Doctor Strange accompany spells with elaborate artifacts, such as the "Eye of Agamotto" and the "Wand of Watoomb", as well as mystical-sounding vocabulary such as "Hoary Hosts of Hoggoth!" or "Shades of the Seraphim!" Although these names were sometimes evocative of established mythological or theological beings, such as the Biblical Seraphim, Lee has said he never had any idea what the incantations meant and used them simply because they sounded mystical and mysterious. Ditko showcased surrealistic mystical landscapes and increasingly vivid visuals that helped make the feature a favorite of college students at the time. Comics historian Mike Benton wrote:

Splash page, Strange Tales #110 (July 1963), the character's debut. Art by Steve Ditko.

The Dr. Strange stories of the 1960s constructed a cohesive cosmology that would have thrilled any self-respecting theosophist. College students, minds freshly opened by psychedelic experiences and Eastern mysticism, read Ditko and Lee's Dr. Strange stories with the belief of a recent Hare Krishna convert. Meaning was everywhere, and readers analyzed the Dr. Strange stories for their relationship to Egyptian myths, Sumerian gods, and Jungian archetypes.

"People who read Doctor Strange thought people at Marvel must be heads [i.e., drug users]," recalled then-associate editor and former Doctor Strange writer Roy Thomas in 1971, "because they had had similar experiences high on mushrooms. But I don't use hallucinogens, nor do I think any artists do."

Originating in the early 1960s, the character was a predictor of trends in the art prior to them becoming more established in the later counterculture of the 1960s. As historian Bradford W. Wright described:

Doctor Strange #177 (Feb. 1969), the debut of Strange's short-lived new look. Cover art by Gene Colan and Tom Palmer.

Steve Ditko contributed some of his most surrealistic work to the comic book and gave it a disorienting, hallucinogenic quality. Dr. Strange's adventures take place in bizarre worlds and twisting dimensions that resembled Salvador Dalí paintings. Inspired by the pulp fiction magicians of Stan Lee's childhood as well as by contemporary Beat culture, Dr. Strange remarkably predicted the youth counterculture's fascination with Eastern mysticism and psychedelia. Never among Marvel's more popular or accessible characters, Dr. Strange still found a niche among an audience seeking a challenging alternative to more conventional superhero fare.

As co-plotter and later sole plotter in the Marvel Method of scripting, Ditko took Strange into ever-more-abstract realms. In a 17-issue story arc in Strange Tales #130–146 (March 1965 – July 1966), Ditko introduced the cosmic character Eternity, who personified the universe and was depicted as a silhouette filled with the cosmos. Golden Age of Comic Books artist/writer Bill Everett succeeded Ditko as an artist with issues #147–152, followed by Marie Severin through #160 and Dan Adkins through #168, the final issue before the Nick Fury feature moved to its own title and Strange Tales was renamed Doctor Strange. Expanded to 20 pages per issue, the Doctor Strange solo series ran 15 issues, #169–183 (June 1968 – November 1969), continuing the numbering of Strange Tales. Thomas wrote the run of new stories, joined after the first three issues by the art team of penciler Gene Colan and inker Tom Palmer through the end.

After plans were announced for a never-released split book series featuring Doctor Strange and Iceman, each in solo adventures, Strange next appeared in the first three issues (December 1971 – June 1972) of the quarterly showcase title Marvel Feature. He appeared in both the main story detailing the formation of superhero team the Defenders, and the related solo back-up story. The character then starred in a revival solo series in Marvel Premiere #3–14 (July 1972 – March 1974). This arc marked the debut of another recurring foe, the entity Shuma-Gorath, first alluded to by writer Gardner Fox in Marvel Premiere #5 and later fully imagined by writer Steve Englehart and artist Frank Brunner, who took over as the regular creative team starting with Marvel Premiere #9. Englehart and Brunner collaborated closely on the stories, meeting over dinner every two months to discuss the series, and their run became known for its psychedelic visuals and plots. In issues #8–10 (May–September 1973), Strange is forced to shut down the Ancient One's mind, causing his mentor's physical death. Strange then assumes the title of Sorcerer Supreme. Englehart and Brunner created another multi-issue storyline featuring sorcerer Sise-Neg ("Genesis" spelled backward) going back through history, collecting all magical energies, until he reaches the beginning of the universe, becomes all-powerful and creates it anew, leaving Strange to wonder whether this was, paradoxically, the original creation. Stan Lee, seeing the issue after publication, ordered Englehart and Brunner to print a retraction saying this was not God but a god, to avoid offending religious readers. According to Frank Brunner, he and Englehart concocted a fake letter from a fictitious minister praising the story, and mailed it to Marvel from Texas. Marvel unwittingly printed the letter in Doctor Strange #3 and dropped the retraction.

Due to the growing number of Doctor Strange readers, the Marvel Premiere series segued to the character's second ongoing title, Doctor Strange: Master of the Mystic Arts, also known as Doctor Strange vol. 2, which ran 81 issues (June 1974 – Feb. 1987). Doctor Strange #14 featured a crossover story with The Tomb of Dracula #44, another series which was being drawn by Gene Colan at the time. In Englehart's final story, he sent Strange back in time to meet Benjamin Franklin.

=== 1980s ===
Strange met his allies Topaz in #75 (February 1986) and Rintrah in #80 (December 1986). The series ended on a cliffhanger as his home, the Sanctum Sanctorum, was heavily damaged during a battle. Among the losses were Doctor Strange's entire collection of mystic books and other important artifacts. As a consequence, Strange was now considerably weaker, and several spells designed to protect humanity from vampires and the evil serpent god Set expired.

The title was discontinued and the character's adventures transferred to another split-book format series. Strange Tales vol. 2, #1–19 (April 1987–Oct. 1988) was shared with street heroes Cloak and Dagger. This new Doctor Strange series resolved Strange's quest to reclaim his power and missing artifacts, and resurrected the Defenders, who had died in the last issue of that team's title.

=== 1990s ===
Strange was returned to his own series, this time titled Doctor Strange: Sorcerer Supreme, which ran 90 issues (November 1988 – June 1996). The initial creative team was writer Peter B. Gillis and artists Richard Case and Randy Emberlin, soon replaced by returning writer Roy Thomas and artist Butch Guice, with storylines often spanning multiple issues. Strange lost the title of "Sorcerer Supreme" in issues #48–49 (Dec. 1992 – Jan. 1993) when he refused to fight a war on behalf of the Vishanti, the mystical entities that empower his spells. During this time the series became part of the "Midnight Sons" group of Marvel's supernatural comics. Doctor Strange found new sources of magical strength in the form of chaos magic, as well as a magic construct he used as a proxy. He would form the Secret Defenders with a rotating roster of heroes, and reunite with the original Defenders. Strange regained his title in Doctor Strange: Sorcerer Supreme #80 (August 1995).

Strange appeared with the Human Torch and the Thing in the one-shot publication Strange Tales vol. 3, #1 (Nov. 1994).

The character was featured in several limited series. The first was Doctor Strange: The Flight of Bones #1–4 (February–May 1999), with a series of spontaneous combustions by criminals instigated by old foe Dormammu. Strange was the catalyst for the creation of a trio of sorceresses in Witches #1–4 (August–November 2004). The Strange limited series (November 2004 – July 2005) by writers J. Michael Straczynski and Samm Barnes updated the character's origin. Another limited series, Doctor Strange: The Oath #1–5 (December 2006 – April 2007), written by Brian K. Vaughan and illustrated by Marcos Martin, focused on Strange's responsibilities as sorcerer and doctor.

Doctor Strange has appeared in four graphic novels: Doctor Strange: Into Shamballa (1986); Doctor Strange & Doctor Doom: Triumph and Torment (1989); Spider-Man/Dr. Strange: The Way to Dusty Death (1992); and Dr. Strange: What Is It That Disturbs You, Stephen? (1997).

=== 2000s ===
Strange appeared as a supporting character for the bulk of the 2000s. He appeared regularly in The Amazing Spider-Man under J. Michael Straczynski, before being cast into a time loop by Baron Mordo. He later appeared on and off in New Avengers, where he was stated as being part of the secret group known as the Illuminati to deal with future threats to Earth. Ultimately Strange joined the team and allowed them to use his home as a base after the events of the 2006 "Civil War" storyline, which he sat out. Doctor Strange was critical of the federal Superhuman Registration Act and aided the anti-registration Avengers team led by Luke Cage.

During Brian Michael Bendis' time as writer, Doctor Doom attacked the Avengers and manipulated the Scarlet Witch into eliminating most of the mutant population. Doctor Strange's failure to recognize Doom's hand in the former and to stop the latter caused him to start to doubt his abilities. After he was forced to use dark magic to confront an enraged Hulk, followed by further use of dark spells to save the New Avengers from the Hood's supervillain army, Strange renounced his status as Sorcerer Supreme, as he felt that he was no longer worthy of it. The Eye of Agamotto passed the mantle on to Jericho Drumm.

He was also featured in The Order, which spun out of the 2001 Defenders revival, and the Indefensible Defenders mini-series.

=== 2010s ===
Doctor Strange appeared as a regular character throughout the 2010-2013 The New Avengers series. Jericho Drumm, now newly appointed Sorcerer Supreme Doctor Voodoo, sacrifices himself to stop the powerful mystical entity Agamotto from reclaiming the Eye. A guilt-ridden Strange rejoins the New Avengers, and he offers the team his valet Wong to act as their housekeeper.

Strange eventually regains his position of Sorcerer Supreme, but is possessed by a demon and becomes leader of the Black Priests.

After the various Marvel universes merge into one, Doctor Strange acts as righthand man of Doctor Doom, who has become the ruler of this world after erasing all recollection of the previous separate realities that existed. Circumstances force Strange to open a pod that releases the surviving heroes of the original Marvel continuity, known as Earth-616. Doom kills Doctor Strange.

In 2015, Jason Aaron and Chris Bachalo teamed up for the fourth volume of Doctor Strange. A new character, reluctant librarian Zelma Stanton, agrees to reorganize Strange's magical library. Jericho Drumm returns, and the series and a spinoff, Dr. Strange: Last Days of Magic, sees such characters as Medico Mistico, Magik, Scarlet Witch, Mahatma Doom, Professor Xu, Monako, and Alice Gulliver. With the laws of magic fundamentally altered, and with the loss of his former resources, Doctor Strange is forced to depend on his own physical skills and inventive use of his few functional spells. He eventually no longer has access to most of his former spells or his levitating cape.

In the storyline "Infinity Countdown", Doctor Strange obtains the Time Stone after defeating Super-Skrull, its previous wielder. Using a magic spell, Doctor Strange speaks to the holders of the other Infinity Stones and instructs them to reform the Infinity Watch.

== Fictional character biography ==
Stephen Vincent Strange, M.D., Ph.D., is a brilliant but highly egotistical doctor. He was born in Philadelphia and raised in New York City. After high school, he went to New York College as a pre-med student, entered medical school at Columbia University and completed his residency at New York-Presbyterian Hospital, where his success made him arrogant.

Despite his reputation for being able to handle even the most complicated surgical procedures, Strange is self-centered and greedy, and only treats patients who can afford to pay his exorbitant fees. One night, while speeding in his car, a terrible accident shatters the bones in his hands, leading to extensive nerve damage. He soon finds that his fingers tremble uncontrollably, rendering him unable to perform surgery. Too vain to accept a teaching job, Strange desperately searches for a way to fix his hands and subsequently wastes all of his money on expensive, but unsuccessful treatments.

Broke and ostracized from his colleagues, Strange becomes a drifter. He happens to overhear two sailors in a bar discussing a hermit called the Ancient One, who is actually the Earth's Sorcerer Supreme, in the Himalayas, who can heal any ailment. Despite not personally believing in magic, Strange uses the last of his money to track down the aged mystic. The Ancient One refuses to help Strange due to his arrogance but senses a good side that he attempts to bring to the surface. He fails, but Strange then commits a heroic act when he discovers that the Ancient One's disciple, Baron Mordo, attempting to kill his mentor and seize his power, when Mordo sets his plan into motion. After a confrontation with Mordo leaves Strange bound by restraining spells that prevent him from either attacking Mordo or warning the Ancient One, he desperately and selflessly accepts the Ancient One's offer to become his apprentice, seeing it as his only chance to save the old master. Pleased by Strange's genuine change of heart, the Ancient One accepts him as his new student and immediately lifts the restraining spells, revealing that he had been aware of Mordo's treachery from the very beginning. Strange soon becomes Mordo's most enduring enemy, as the Ancient One trains the doctor in the mystic arts.

After completing his training, Strange returns to New York City and takes up residence within the Sanctum Sanctorum, a townhouse located in Greenwich Village, Manhattan, accompanied by his personal assistant Wong.

As the Ancient One's disciple, Strange encounters the entity Nightmare, and other mystical foes before meeting Dormammu, a warlord from an alternate dimension called the "Dark Dimension" who wishes to conquer Earth. Strange is aided by a nameless girl, later called Clea, who is eventually revealed to be Dormammu's niece. When Strange helps a weakened Dormammu drive off the rampaging Mindless Ones and return them to their prison, he is allowed to leave the Dark Dimension unchallenged.

In The Unbelievable Gwenpool #3, Strange encounters Gwendolyn Poole, who explains herself to be from a reality where all Marvel characters are fictional characters in comic books. As Strange helps her locate her home reality to create a fake background for her in the Marvel Universe so that she can get a Social Security number, driver's license and other essential documents, he discovers that Benedict Cumberbatch has been cast to play him in Gwen's universe, remarking that he "could see that".

== Powers and abilities ==
=== Powers and skills ===
Doctor Strange is a practicing sorcerer who draws his powers from mystical entities such as Agamotto, Cyttorak, Ikonn, Oshtur, Raggadorr, and Watoomb, who lend their energies for spells. Strange also wields mystical artifacts including the Cloak of Levitation which enables him to fly; (Note: The blue "student" version first appeared in Strange Tales #110 (July 1963), with the red "master" version first appearing in Strange Tales #127 (Dec. 1964).) the Eye of Agamotto, an amulet whose light is used to negate evil magic; the Book of the Vishanti, a grimoire which contains vast knowledge of white magic; and the Orb of Agamotto, a crystal ball which is used for clairvoyance and scrying.

In addition to his magical abilities, Strange is trained in several martial arts disciplines, including judo, and has shown proficiency with numerous magically conjured weapons including swords and axes. Strange was a skilled neurosurgeon before nerve damage impaired his hands.

Doctor Strange is described as "the mightiest magician in the cosmos" and "more powerful by far than any of your fellow humanoids" by Eternity, the sentience of the Marvel Universe. He holds the title of Sorcerer Supreme beginning with the 1973 storyline in which the Ancient One dies, and retains the title thereafter, except during an interruption from 1992 to 1995. He relinquishes the title once again in a 2009 storyline, but reclaims it in a 2012 story when he proves himself willing to protect the world even without the title.

=== Artifacts and technology ===
==== Book of the Vishanti ====
The Book of the Vishanti, portrayed as being written by unknown authors, is closely associated with Doctor Strange and is the greatest known source of white magical knowledge on Earth. The Book of the Vishanti contains spells of defensive magic and is indestructible. Its counterpart, the Darkhold, contains all the knowledge of black magic in the Marvel Universe and is likewise indestructible. It is possible to destroy single pages of either book, but the balancing spell in the other book must be destroyed as well to maintain a mystical balance. A collective of the three powerful magical beings—Agamotto, Oshtur, and Hoggoth—known as the Vishanti must allow the spell to be destroyed.

Even though the book is a tome of benevolent magic, the spells within can still be dangerous when used improperly. This is proven when a young, inexperienced Strange tried to use the Book of the Vishanti to resurrect his dead brother Victor, but the spell, known as the Vampire Verses, caused Victor to become the vampire Baron Blood years later.

The first known owner of the book was the Atlantean sorcerer Varnae, who lived around 18,500 BC. The next known owner was the Babylonian god Marduk Kurios. Marduk set a griffin to guard the Book. The sorcerer known as the Ancient One traveled back in time to c. 4000 BC, defeated the griffin, and returned to the 20th century. The Ancient One would remain the book's owner, despite a brief loss when the dark wizard Kaluu returned the Book to the Griffin, until he deemed his student, Doctor Strange, worthy of taking it.

Doctor Strange keeps the book in his townhouse library in New York City's Greenwich Village. He briefly lost the book when he destroyed his home to prevent the alien wizard Urthona from taking his magical artifacts, but the book was saved by Agamotto, who transported it to his realm and returned it to Strange some time later.

==== Cloak of Levitation ====
The Cloak of Levitation is a potent mystical cloak worn by Doctor Strange. The cloak allows the wearer to fly and can alter its shape, being often used to act as "another set of hands" to attack an opponent when Strange's own body has been incapacitated.

There were two distinctly different cloaks worn by Doctor Strange bequeathed to him by his mentor, the Ancient One: a blue cloak, which had minor abilities and spells woven into it, and the later, red cloak that Strange is usually seen wearing. The first appearance of the blue cloak was in Strange Tales #114 (November 1963). The first appearance of the red cloak was in Strange Tales #127 (December 1964). The Cloak of Levitation is seen in a great many battles where it often plays a very significant role. While it is extremely durable, there are a few occasions when it is damaged. Its repair requires that Strange engage an ally, Enitharmon the Weaver.

==== Eye of Agamotto ====
The Eye of Agamotto is the name commonly given to the amulet which Strange wears on his chest, though the Eye resides within the amulet and is released from time to time.

Created by writer Stan Lee and artist Steve Ditko, it first appeared in "The Origin of Dr. Strange", an eight-page story in Strange Tales #115 (December 1963). In designing the Eye, Ditko drew inspiration from the Eyes of Buddha, a Nepali symbol meant to protect its wearer against evil.

The Eye of Agamotto appears in several forms of Marvel-related media, such as the Marvel Cinematic Universe, in which it contains the Time Stone, one of the Infinity Stones.

==== Orb of Agamotto ====
The Orb of Agamotto is a crystal ball powered by Agamotto that can detect the use of magic anywhere in the world, providing Strange with a location and visual. It can also be used to monitor the shields that protect the planets created by the three sanctums. If Agamotto is inside the Orb, it becomes Strange's ultimate source of knowledge.

The Orb of Agamotto rests in Doctor Strange's Sanctum Sanctorum in a room called the Chamber of Shadows. It usually is inside a display case with three curved legs. When summoned, the glass covering rises and the ball levitates. While powerful, the Orb has been blocked by exceptionally powerful mystic forces (such as Umar) who do not want their exact location known. On at least one occasion, it has been used to open a dimensional portal to the realm of Agamotto. In the film Thor, the Orb is briefly shown in Odin's Trophy Room in Asgard.

== Sorcerer Supreme ==
Doctor Strange is generally portrayed as the Sorcerer Supreme, a title denoting a specific magic-user who is given responsibility for protecting Earth and the known universe from both supernatural and magical threats. The Sorcerer Supreme also ensures that alternate dimensions such as the Dark Dimension do not spill over into their own, thereby preventing cataclysmic mergers that would result in the mass extinction of life.

Prior to Strange, the Sorcerer Supreme was a long-lived Tibetan mystic known as the Ancient One; upon his death and ascension to the spirit world, Strange took his place. During the "Blood Hunt" storyline, Doctor Doom usurps the position of Sorcerer Supreme from Strange, having been given part of his power to disperse the Darkforce cloud and end the vampire invasion of Earth. The Scarlet Witch succeeded Doom as Sorcerer Supreme in a self-titled series, which debuted in December 2025.

== Enemies ==
- Aggamon – The ruler of the Purple Dimension.
- Baron Mordo – An evil wizard and former student of the Ancient One.
- D'Spayre – A fear-eating demon who is a member of the Fear Lords.
- Dagoth – A sea demon who is the spawn of Dagon.
- Dormammu – A demon who is the ruler of the Dark Dimension.
- Dweller-in-Darkness – A fear-generating demon who is a member of the Fear Lords.
- Enchantress – An Asgardian sorceress. Doctor Strange first clashed with her during the "Acts of Vengeance" storyline.
- Kaecilius – An evil wizard who works for Baron Mordo.
- Kaluu – A 500-year-old wizard and a former classmate of the Ancient One.
- Mindless Ones – The inhabitants of the Dark Dimension, who serve as Dormammu's foot soldiers.
- Mister Rasputin – A sorcerer who is the alleged descendant of Grigori Rasputin.
- Necromancer – Counter-Earth's version of Doctor Strange.
- Nightmare – The ruler of the Dream Dimension.
- Paradox – A magical construct created by Doctor Strange who was originally used to fill in for him.
- Satannish – An extra-dimensional demon.
- Shanzar – The Sorcerer Supreme of the Strange Matter Dimension. He once possessed Hulk, turning him into Dark Hulk.
- Shazana - Extradimensional sorceress and queen.
- Shuma-Gorath – A many-angled one who existed during Earth's pre-history.
- Silver Dagger – A religious sorcerer.
- Sons of Satannish – A cult that worships Satannish.
- Stygyro - A 17th-century magician.
- Tiboro – A humanoid who claims to be from the Sixth Dimension.
- Umar – A resident of the Dark Dimension and the sister of Dormammu.
- Undying Ones – A race of demons from another dimension with a variety of magic and a variety of forms.
- Yandroth – A Scientist Supreme from the otherdimensional planet Yann.

== Cultural impact and legacy ==
=== Critical response ===
Steve Ditko's artwork is considered groundbreaking in comic book history, featuring surreal and psychedelic imagery that mirrored the growing counterculture of the 1960s. His visual style, with its otherworldly dimensions and abstract landscapes, was highly innovative. It has been compared to the visual experiences of people who had used LSD. This made the comics very popular with the growing counterculture movement of the time.

Laura Bradley of Vanity Fair included Doctor Strange in their "Stan Lee’s Most Iconic Characters" list. Screen Rant included Doctor Strange in their "10 Most Powerful Comic Book Wizards" list, and in their "10 Smartest Magic Users In Comic Books" list. CBR.com ranked Doctor Strange 1st in their "10 Best Sorcerer Supremes" list, and 5th in their "10 Scariest Avengers" list. Collider ranked Doctor Strange 1st in their "Most Powerful Original Marvel Illuminati Members" list, and 14th in their "20 Most Powerful Marvel Characters" list.

Lance Cartelli of GameSpot ranked Doctor Strange 27th in their "50 Most Important Superheroes" list. IGN ranked Doctor Strange 33rd in their "Top 50 Avengers" list, and 38th in their "Top 100 Comic Book Heroes" list. The A.V. Club ranked Doctor Strange 47th in their "100 best Marvel characters" list. Lance Cartelli of ComicBook.com ranked Doctor Strange 35th in their "50 Most Important Superheroes Ever" list. Wizard Magazine ranked Doctor Strange 83rd in their "200 Greatest Comic Book Characters of All Time" list.

=== Impact ===
- Doctor Strange inspired the name of the psychedelic band Dr. Strangely Strange.
- Doctor Strange's character inspired the Khalid Nassour version of the Doctor Fate character, which was created by Paul Levitz.
- Doctor Strange is referenced in the 1971 song "Mambo Sun" by glam rock band T. Rex on their album Electric Warrior.
- Doctor Strange is referenced in the song "Cymbaline" by English progressive rock band Pink Floyd on their 1969 album More.
- Doctor Strange appears on the cover of Pink Floyd's second studio album A Saucerful of Secrets, which contains a hidden image based on a panel from a 1967 Doctor Strange comic book story. The image used came from Strange Tales #158, illustrated by Marie Severin.

== Other versions ==
Two months before the debut of the sorcerer-hero Doctor Strange, Stan Lee (editor and story-plotter), Robert Bernstein (scripter, under the pseudonym "R. Berns"), and Jack Kirby (artist) introduced a criminal scientist and Ph.D. with the same surname (called Carl Strange). Making his sole appearance in the Iron Man story "The Stronghold of Dr. Strange" in Tales of Suspense #41 (1963), the character gained mental powers in a freak lightning strike.

=== Amalgam Comics ===
In the Amalgam Comics universe, Doctor Strangefate is a composite character based on Doctor Strange, Professor X, and DC Comics character Doctor Fate; Strangefate is the only character aware of the nature of the Amalgam Universe as a composite universe.

=== Bullet Points ===
In Bullet Points, Stephen Strange chooses to work for S.H.I.E.L.D., rather than seek out the Ancient One, in exchange for having his hands healed.

=== Exiles ===
An alternate universe version of Doctor Strange appears in Exiles. This version is a physician with no magical powers who specializes in treating superhumans. This version of Strange was killed by an alternative version of Deadpool.

=== Fantastic Four: The End ===
In Fantastic Four: The End, Doctor Strange is the Ancient One and had a daughter with Clea, with their daughter becoming the second Doctor Strange.

=== Guardians of the Galaxy ===
In the alternative future of the Guardians of the Galaxy, Doctor Strange assumes the title of the Ancient One (previously held by his mentor) and took on a disciple of his own, a Lem named Krugarr. Strange is later killed by Dormammu.

=== Marvel 2099 ===
Set in the Marvel 2099 universe, the Sorceress Supreme of Earth is a young woman who calls herself "Strange".

==== Earth-928 ====
Jeannie is a woman who secretly shares her body with a monstrous demon. She is very inexperienced in her powers and uses them recklessly.

==== Maestro's 2099 ====
In a 'reset' 2099 timeline where the Maestro has conquered a decimated world, he apparently kept Strange contained in a mystical circle. When Miguel O'Hara emerged into this timeline and released Strange, she claimed that the demon possessing her protected her from major world-shifts, working with Miguel to repair an old time machine of Doctor Doom's so that he could return to 2015 and avert this timeline. After Miguel's departure, Strange revealed that she was working with the Maestro and was under the control of the demon within her.

==== Secret Wars 2099 ====
During the "Secret Wars" storyline, a version of Strange appears on Battleworld as a member of the Defenders 2099.

==== Unidentified 2099 reality ====
When Miguel returns to a new variation of the 2099 timeline where having superpowers is illegal, he witnesses Moon Knight banishing the demon from Strange's body sword.

==== Earth-2099 ====
In the unified Marvel 2099 reality of Earth-2099, Strange was a member of the Avengers until she was killed by the Masters of Evil. Strange later returned to life through unnamed means. Her full name is given as Jean Davidson and she is revealed to have created Earth-2099 by merging Earth-928, Earth-2992, Earth-9411, and several other universes.

=== Marvel Zombies ===
In the Marvel Zombies universe, Dr. Strange is one of the last heroes in the alternative "zombie world" to be transformed into a zombie. He was last seen in living form as part of Nick Fury's resistance to defeat the zombified Marvel superheroes in the spinoff Dead Days before he and the rest of the surviving superheroes are later overwhelmed by the zombie Fantastic Four and turned. Strange becomes part of Kingpin's undead alliance and can only perform two spells, one of which allows viewers to see into other universes. Strange is later killed by Ultron.

=== MC2 ===
Set in the MC2 universe. Dr. Strange is retired and the title of Sorcerer Supreme has been passed to the younger Doc Magus.

=== Mutant X ===
In Mutant X, Stephen Strange became Man-Thing, with Baron Mordo being Sorcerer Supreme.

=== Spider-Ham ===
Set in the Larval zooniverse, the talking animal version of Doctor Strange is Croctor Strange, an anthropomorphic crocodile.

=== Thor: Vikings ===
Dr. Strange assists Thor in the MAX mini series Thor: Vikings, when zombified, evil Vikings massacre Manhattan by pillaging and killing its citizens. Strange helps Thor locate the descendants of a victim that the Vikings had slain, just after the victim, a village wiseman had placed a curse on the Vikings that caused them to become zombified. With Strange's instruction, the battle-experienced descendants all fight the Vikings with Thor.

=== Ultimate Marvel ===
There are two versions of Doctor Strange that reside in the Ultimate Marvel Universe.

==== Stephen Strange Sr. ====
First appearing in flashbacks, Dr. Stephen Strange married his former student Clea and the two of them had a child named Stephen Strange Jr. Strange Sr. later vanished and Clea decided to raise Stephen Jr. away from magic. The title of "Sorcerer Supreme" was only self-proclaimed by the elder Strange as reported in the comics during a TV news broadcast.

==== Stephen Strange Jr. ====
As a college student, Stephen Strange Jr. was approached by Wong who told him about his father and took him on as a student. He supports himself as a new-age guru to the rich, powerful, and famous, and is seen as a celebrity appearing on television talk shows. He is known to the public as "Dr. Strange", although he does not hold a medical degree or doctorate. Stephen Strange Jr. has bemoaned his lack of knowledge in things mystical and usually, just barely saves the day with one last desperate untried spell. Starting in Ultimate Spider-Man #107, this Doctor Strange is a member of Daredevil's team fighting against the Kingpin, the Ultimate Knights.

In Ultimatum, Strange is killed by Dormammu when Hulk rampages through his house. A mysterious person later found his body.

=== Venomverse ===
A Venomized version of Doctor Strange appears in Venomverse, who is responsible for gathering all of the different incarnations of Venom. His Earth was eradicated by the Poisons so he had gathered Venoms from across the multiverse to prevent the Poisons from consuming more of them. He is captured by the Poisons and he realizes that instead of bringing more Venoms to fight, he had brought the Poisons more Venoms to consume. In the climax he sends all of the surviving Venoms to their universes while the bomb built by Rocket Raccoon explodes. His fate is unknown.

=== What If?... ===
Dr. Strange also exists in several What If?... multiverses.

- In "What If....Doctor Strange Had Been Disciple of Dormammu?", Strange's damaged hands are fully healed by Mordo using dark magic before he meets the Ancient One, and so he becomes Mordo's student instead and a disciple of Dormammu. When Strange is forced into a battle between Dormammu and the Ancient One, however, he rejects evil and helps the Ancient One banish the wicked sorcerer and his master. Thus, Strange becomes the Sorcerer Supreme as he was meant to.
- In "What If...Dr. Strange Had Not Become Master of the Mystic Arts?", Strange does not overhear the fateful conversation that reveals to him the existence of the Ancient One. Thus, Mordo becomes Sorcerer Supreme.

== In other media ==
=== Television ===
- Doctor Strange appears in the Spider-Man and His Amazing Friends episode "7 Little Superheroes", voiced by John Stephenson.
- Doctor Strange makes a non-speaking appearance in the X-Men: The Animated Series episode "The Dark Phoenix Saga (Part 3)".
- Doctor Strange appears in a self-titled episode of Spider-Man: The Animated Series, voiced by John Vernon.
- Doctor Strange appears in The Incredible Hulk episode "Mind Over Anti-Matter", voiced by Maurice LaMarche.
- Doctor Strange appears in The Super Hero Squad Show, voiced by Roger Rose.
- Doctor Strange appears in the Disney XD Marvel animated series Ultimate Spider-Man, Avengers Assemble, and Hulk and the Agents of S.M.A.S.H., voiced originally by Jack Coleman, and later by Liam O'Brien.
- Doctor Strange appears in Marvel Disk Wars: The Avengers, voiced by Yasunori Masutani in the Japanese dub, and Wally Wingert (episode 2) and Liam O'Brien (episode 46) in the English dub.
- Doctor Strange appears in Lego Marvel Super Heroes: Black Panther – Trouble in Wakanda, voiced again by Liam O'Brien.
- Doctor Strange appears in Marvel Future Avengers, voiced again by Yasunori Masutani in the Japanese dub and Liam O'Brien in the English dub.
- Doctor Strange appears in the Spider-Man (2017) episode "Amazing Friends", voiced again by Liam O'Brien. This version is a member of the Avengers.
- Doctor Strange appears in Marvel Super Hero Adventures, voiced by Toren Atkinson.
- Doctor Strange makes a non-speaking cameo appearance in the X-Men '97 episode "Tolerance is Extinction - Part 3".

=== Film ===
- Doctor Strange appears in a self-titled film (1978), portrayed by Peter Hooten. This version is a psychiatrist.
- Doctor Mordrid began development as a Doctor Strange adaptation, but the studio's license expired before production began. As a result, the project was rewritten to change the main character's name and slightly alter his origin. Additionally, the main character was originally going to be called "Doctor Mortalis" and Jack Kirby worked on early concept art.
- Doctor Strange appears in Doctor Strange: The Sorcerer Supreme, voiced by Bryce Johnson.
- Doctor Strange makes a non-speaking cameo appearance in Planet Hulk as a member of the Illuminati.
- Doctor Strange appears in Hulk: Where Monsters Dwell, voiced again by Liam O'Brien.

=== Marvel Cinematic Universe ===
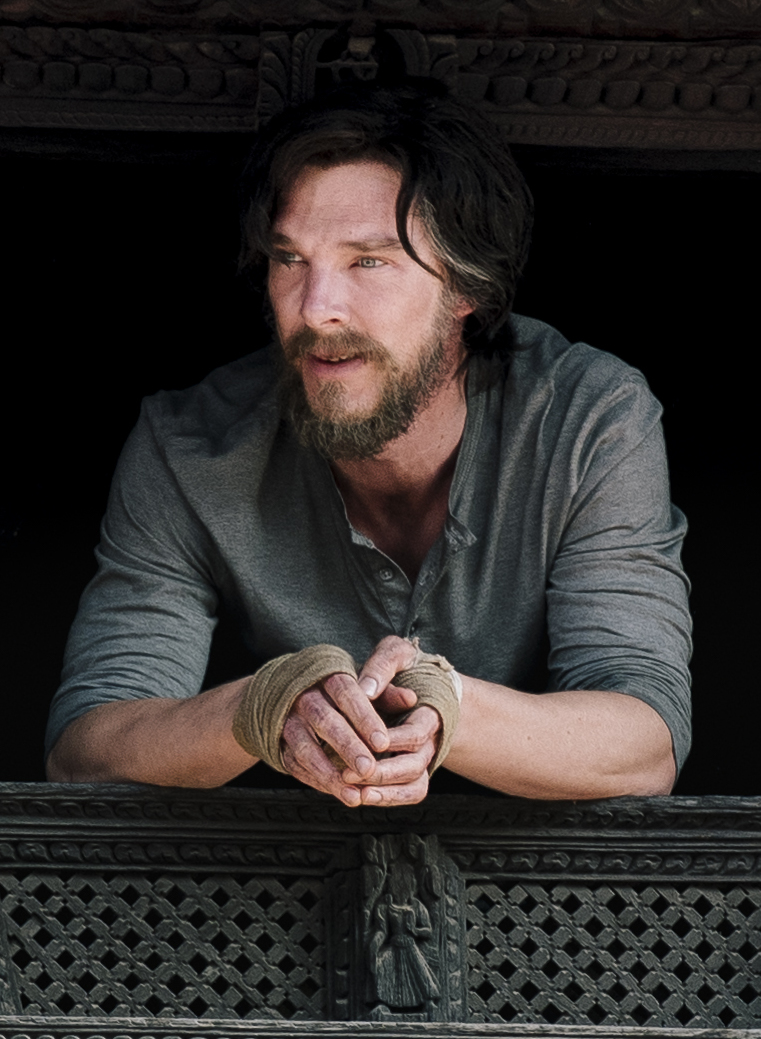
Benedict Cumberbatch in character as Doctor Strange on the set of the 2016 film

Doctor Stephen Strange appears in media set in the Marvel Cinematic Universe (MCU), portrayed by Benedict Cumberbatch. First appearing in a self-titled film (2016), this version is a successful, wealthy neurosurgeon who becomes severely injured following a car accident, leading him to travel the world for answers to heal his injuries, eventually landing in Kamar-Taj, and becoming a Master of the Mystic Arts. He makes further appearances in Thor: Ragnarok, Avengers: Infinity War, Avengers: Endgame, Spider-Man: No Way Home, and Doctor Strange in the Multiverse of Madness and will return in Avengers: Doomsday. Additionally, alternate timeline variants of Strange appear in What If... ? and Your Friendly Neighborhood Spider-Man, with the latter version voiced by Robin Atkin Downes.

=== Video games ===
- Doctor Strange appears as a non-player character (NPC) in The Amazing Spider-Man vs. The Kingpin. This version serves as Spider-Man's advisor.
- Doctor Strange appears as a playable character in Marvel: Ultimate Alliance, voiced by James Horan.
- Doctor Strange appears in Hsien-Ko's ending in Marvel vs. Capcom 3: Fate of Two Worlds.
  - He later appears as a playable character in the updated version, Ultimate Marvel vs. Capcom 3, voiced by Rick Pasqualone.
- Doctor Strange appears as a playable character in Marvel Super Hero Squad Online, voiced by Charlie Adler.
- Doctor Strange appears as a playable character in Marvel Avengers Alliance.
- Doctor Strange appears as a playable character in Marvel Avengers: Battle for Earth, voiced by Chris Cox.
- Doctor Strange appears as a playable character in Marvel Heroes, voiced by Nick Jameson.
- Doctor Strange appears as a playable character in Lego Marvel Super Heroes, voiced again by James Horan.
- Doctor Strange appears as a playable character in Marvel Contest of Champions.
- Doctor Strange appears as a playable character in Lego Marvel's Avengers, voiced by Wally Wingert. Additionally, an "All-New, All-Different Doctor Strange" appears in a self-titled DLC, voiced by Jack Coleman.
- Doctor Strange appears as a playable character in Marvel Future Fight.
- Two versions of Doctor Strange, "Stephen Strange" and the "Sorcerer Supreme", appear as playable characters in Marvel Puzzle Quest.
- Doctor Strange appears as a playable character in Marvel vs. Capcom: Infinite, voiced again by Liam O'Brien.
- Doctor Strange appears as a playable character in Lego Marvel Super Heroes 2, voiced by Ramon Tikaram.
- Doctor Strange appears as a playable character in Marvel Powers United VR, voiced again by Liam O'Brien.
- Doctor Strange appears as a playable character in Marvel Ultimate Alliance 3: The Black Order, voiced again by Liam O'Brien.
- Doctor Strange appears in Marvel Dimension of Heroes, voiced again by Liam O'Brien.
- Doctor Strange appears as a playable character in Marvel Future Revolution, voiced again by Liam O'Brien.
- Doctor Strange appears in Marvel Snap.
- Doctor Strange appears as a playable character in Marvel's Midnight Suns, voiced again by Rick Pasqualone. This version displays a rivalry with Iron Man.
- Doctor Strange appears as a playable character in Marvel Rivals, voiced again by Liam O'Brien.

=== Miscellaneous ===
- Doctor Strange appears in a self-titled WBAI radio drama.
- Doctor Strange appears in Doctor Strange, Master of the Mystic Arts: Nightmare, written by William Rotsler and published by Pocket Books.
- Doctor Strange makes a cameo appearance in Spider-Man: The Darkest Hours, by Jim Butcher.
