= Rasputin (disambiguation) =

Grigori Rasputin (1869–1916) was a Russian/Siberian peasant and mystic, who became a healer and adviser for the Romanovs at the end of the Russian Empire.

Rasputin may also refer to:

== People ==
- Maria Rasputin (1898–1977), Grigori Rasputin's daughter
- Valentin Rasputin (1937–2015), Russian writer

== Films ==
- Rasputin, the Black Monk, a 1917 silent film
- Rasputin (1928 film), a.k.a. Rasputin, the Prince of Sinners, a German-Soviet film directed by Nikolai Larin and Boris Nevolin
- Rasputin, the Holy Sinner (1928), a.k.a. Rasputin, the Holy Devil, a German silent film directed by Martin Berger
- Rasputin (1929), a German film directed by Max Neufeld who also played Rasputin in the film
- Rasputin and the Empress (1932 film), starring Lionel Barrymore (as Rasputin), Ethel Barrymore and John Barrymore
- Rasputin (1938 film), a French film directed by Marcel L'Herbier
- Rasputin (1954 film), a French-Italian film directed by Georges Combret
- Rasputin the Mad Monk, a 1966 British film starring Christopher Lee
- Agony (1981 film), a 1975 Soviet film by director Elem Klimov released in the U.S. as Rasputin
- Rasputin: Dark Servant of Destiny, a 1996 HBO made-for-television film
- Rasputin (2010 film), a film directed by Louis Nero
- Rasputin (2015 film), a romantic comedy film

== Novels ==
- Rasputin, a 1923 Russian novel by Ivan Nazhivin
- Rasputin, a 1927 German novel by Klabund, on which the 1932 MGM film was based
- Rasputin (Orson Scott Card novel), planned but unpublished novel

== Characters ==
- Rasputin, a character in the graphic novel series, Corto Maltese
- Rasputin (World Heroes), character in World Heroes
- Grigori Rasputin (Hellboy), character in Hellboy
- Piotr Rasputin, alias of Colossus, a Marvel Comics character
- Rasputin, a character in the comic book Inspector Canardo
- Mikhail Rasputin, Marvel Comics character
- Mister Rasputin, Marvel Comics character
- Razputin "Raz" Aquato, protagonist of the video game Psychonauts
- Rasputin, the Mad Frog; one of the Punk Frogs from the Teenage Mutant Ninja Turtles series
- Rasputin, a.k.a. AI-COM/RSPN, or the Tyrant, a character from the video game Destiny

== Music ==
- "Rasputin" (song), by Boney M., 1978
- Rasputin (opera), a 2003 opera by Einojuhani Rautavaara
- Rasputin Music, a music chain in the San Francisco Bay Area of California
- "Rasputin", a song by Cavalera Conspiracy from Blunt Force Trauma, 2011
- "Rasputin", a song by Hard Rock Sofa, 2013
- "Rasputin", a song by Jack Lucien from New 80s Musik, 2008
- Rasputin – Miracles Lie in the Eye of the Beholder, a 2000 rock opera about Grigori Rasputin
- "Rasputin", a song by Ziak

== See also ==
- Rasputina (disambiguation)
- Rasputin scandal
- Rasputin vs. Stalin
