= Rasputina =

Rasputina may refer to:

- Maria Rasputin (1898–1977), daughter of Grigori Rasputin
- Masha Rasputina (born 1965), Russian pop singer
- Rasputina (band), American rock band
- Illyana Rasputina, alias of Magik, a Marvel Comics character

== See also ==
- Rasputin (disambiguation)
