= Dormammu =

Marvel Comics fictional character

- Dormammu taken from a variant cover of Bring on the Bad Guys: Dormammu #1 (August 2025). Art by Miguel Mercado

Publication information
- Publisher: Marvel Comics
- First appearance: Strange Tales #126 (November 1964)
- Created by: Stan Lee (writer); Steve Ditko (artist)

In-story information
- Species: Faltine
- Team affiliations: Mindless Ones
- Partnerships: Umar
- Notable aliases: Lord of the Dark Dimension; The Great Enigma; Lord of Darkness; The Dread One; Lord of Chaos
- Abilities: Superhuman strength, speed, and durability; Mystic energy manipulation; Dimensional teleportation; Mastery of dark magic; Energy projection; Body possession; Power bestowal; Size alteration; Immortality; Time travel

Dormammu (/dɔːrˈmɑːmuː/) is a character appearing in American comic books published by Marvel Comics. Created by Stan Lee and Steve Ditko, Dormammu first appeared in Strange Tales #126 (November 1964). He is the extra and inter-dimensional demonic entity and deity brother of Umar and the uncle of superheroine Clea who rules over the Dark Dimension. The character has endured as a recurring antagonist of the superhero Doctor Strange.

Dormammu has appeared in associated Marvel merchandise including films, animated television series, toys, trading cards, and video games. He made his live-action debut in the 2016 Marvel Cinematic Universe film Doctor Strange, performed through motion capture by Benedict Cumberbatch and voiced by a mixture of Cumberbatch and an unidentified British actor.

== Publication history ==
Dormammu's debut in Strange Tales #126

Dormammu first appeared in Strange Tales #126–127 (Nov.–Dec. 1964), but had been mentioned previously in dialogue, along with his realm the "Dark Dimension".

Writer Mike Conroy said:

To Lee and Steve Ditko, the Lord of the Realm of Darkness and the associated invocations were just another piece of business, another way of adding depth to the otherwordly [sic?] nature of Strange's adventures. However, the readers were intrigued. They wanted to know more. "It seems there was something about that nutty name, Dormammu, that was keeping Doc's devoted disciples awake at nights trying to figure out who Dormammu was," Lee explained. "I knew I was in big trouble. I had made up the name—now I had to dream up a character to go with the name. But who? How? Ditko visualized the answer. "He gave the demoniac DD...a visage totally different from any villain I had ever seen in comics before," proclaimed Lee.

After being established as the ruler of an alternate dimension (later described as the god-tyrant of its denizens), Dormammu became a perennial foe of Sorcerer Supreme Doctor Strange, who until this time had dealt almost exclusively with off-beat "one-off" mystical threats in Strange Tales #110–125 (July 1963 – Oct. 1964). Strange's first encounter with Dormammu in the "Dark Dimension" also introduced Clea, eventually revealed to be the niece of the villain (like Clea's name, this was not initially revealed in Strange Tales #126; Nov. 1964), and the monstrous and imprisoned Mindless Ones.

Dormammu's major appearances include starring in an epic fifteen issue storyline in Strange Tales #131–146 (Apr. 1965 – July 1966); the discovery that Dormammu has a sister, Umar, and both are in fact mystical beings called Faltine in Strange Tales #150 (Nov. 1966); teaming with fellow villain Loki to instigate the "Avengers-Defenders War" in The Avengers #115–118 (Sept.–Dec. 1973) and The Defenders #8–11 (Sept.–Dec. 1973); Thor Annual #9 (1981); Doctor Strange, Sorcerer Supreme #1–2 (Nov. 1988 & Jan. 1989) and the limited series Doctor Strange: The Flight of the Bones #1–4 (Feb.–May 1999) and Hellcat #1–3 (Sept.–Nov. 2000).

After a major appearance in The Amazing Spider-Man #498–500 (Oct.–Dec. 2003), Dormammu became the patron of small-time villain the Hood in New Avengers #46 (Dec. 2008).

== Fictional character biography ==
=== 1960s ===
Dormammu is first mentioned by Karl Amadeus Mordo, senior apprentice of the Ancient One, who serves as the "Sorcerer Supreme" and protector of Earth. Secretly in the entity's service, Mordo attempts to slowly weaken the Ancient One as a means of enabling Dormammu to finally extend his rule to Earth, but is stopped when his fellow pupil Stephen Strange alerts his master to the betrayal.

Dormammu later appears in person when sending a messenger to boast his renewed intentions of conquering his universe before his aging adversary. In response, Doctor Strange travels to Dormammu's "Dark Dimension" as the Ancient One does not consider himself powerful enough to defeat Dormammu and manages to overcome all supernatural servitors sent against him. Dormammu engages Strange in mystic combat and shows himself to be far more powerful, but, when drawing upon the realm's energies, inadvertently weakens the barrier containing the horde of Mindless Ones. Since they threatened Dormammu's subjects, Strange helped his enemy to re-seal the juggernauts by letting power from his amulet flow into Dormammu. Indebted to Strange for his help, Dormammu ends the fight, and in return Strange demands a binding vow to never enter the "Earth realm" again and to not harm Clea. Dormammu complies, but gains a burning hatred against Strange for the humiliation.

Dormammu uses a loophole to his oath by granting Mordo vast power, whereupon the sorcerer leads his minions on a lengthy hunt for Strange and abduct the Ancient One as a bargaining chip. Dormammu's niece, Clea, assists Strange by weakening the barrier of the Mindless Ones, forcing her uncle to focus elsewhere. Dormammu learns of her betrayal, brings all three Earth sorcerers to a neutral realm, to let her see his disciple destroy Strange, and summons fellow "Lords of the Netherworlds" to watch the spectacle. When Strange begins to get an advantage against Mordo, Dormammu decides to face the sorcerer in a contest of pure hand-to-hand-combat. The physically stronger entity eventually falls to his foe's greater familiarity with martial arts. To Dormammu's humiliation, before the gathered Lords, Strange forces him to vow not to menace the Earth even by proxy. The villain strikes a parting blow by banishing Clea and inciting another lord to attack Strange.

In an apparent bid for power Dormammu engages the universal embodiment, Eternity, in single combat, but is defeated and banished.

Dormammu captures Clea, and overpowers and imprisons Strange. The sorcerer manipulates Umar into freeing him, and then surprises Dormammu by pushing him through a portal to the Earth. This makes the entity wither from the curse cast by his own power, when vowing to never enter the Earth realm, and he departs to his own plane.

=== 1970s ===
Dormammu enters into an alliance with the Asgardian Loki and tricks superhero teams the Avengers and Defenders into fighting each other for components of the artifact known as the Evil Eye of Avalon. The Eye is reassembled, and allows Dormammu to merge his own universe with all the planets of the "regular" Marvel Universe without breaking his vow. Dormammu imprisons the traitorous Loki and effortlessly overwhelms all of his other opponents, leaving only the Scarlet Witch. When Loki escapes and distracts Dormammu, the Scarlet Witch casts a hex on the Eye that causes it to absorb Dormammu, and costs Loki his sanity.

After being seen in flashback, Dormammu manages to reintegrate himself on Earth, but is recovering slowly to full strength. Together with Umar, Dormammu captures the elder goddess Gaea, and seeks revenge against the Scarlet Witch by kidnapping her and her mentor Agatha Harkness from her wedding to the Vision. After Wanda and Agatha remove the heat needed for his regeneration, he departs for his own realm. Immediately afterwards, he attempts to destroy Doctor Strange and Clea. He is betrayed by Umar, who steals his power and allows Dormammu to be banished from Earth.

Dormammu tricks Strange into battling both the demon Ghost Rider and the Bounty Hunter in an unsuccessful attempt to kill Strange. Dormammu appears in a "What If...?" alternate universe story as Strange's master in that reality.

=== 1980s ===
Dormammu acts as the envoy of Lord Chaos and plays against Odin in a cosmic chess match whose outcome decides the universal balance of chaos and order. Umar attempts to rig the game in her brother's favor by manipulating Odin's son Thor unsuccessfully, and the game ends in a draw.

Dormammu's agent Baron Mordo travels back in time to London in the year 1943, where he allies with the aristocrats Viscount Krowler and Sir Anthony Baskerville. Dormammu possesses Krowler, and begins to manifest on the Earth plane by absorbing power from the destruction of World War II, but he is banished by Doctor Strange.

Dormammu reappears during the "Inferno" storyline. Strange, following an arduous confrontation with Shuma-Gorath, heals through a process that takes him through various mystical realms. This allows Dormammu to attach himself to his foe, and possess the sorcerer's body, which exempts him from the vow to not directly enter the Earth-realm. Summoning extraterrestrial sorcerers as his lieutenants, Dormammu vows to "burn" and replace the Celestials as the greatest power in the Earth's universe, but is distracted and tricked by Clea and Strange (his consciousness occupying a rat), while their ally Topaz exorcises Dormammu's presence.

=== 1990s ===
Dormammu reconstitutes again, regains control of the Dark Dimension from Clea by subverting her will, and summons her parents, Umar and Orini, from exile. Umar and Baron Mordo join forces with Clea and Doctor Strange. The enraged Dormammu threatens to completely destroy the "Dark Dimension" in retaliation, but Umar convinces him to accept a compromise as the ruler of a sub-realm, whereas his sister takes over rulership from Clea, with Mordo as her consort. Clea agrees to abdicate rather than see all of her people killed, but promises to return if Umar becomes a tyrant again. Dormammu finds that he has been tricked into becoming the ruler of the realm of the Mindless Ones.

After two brief appearances, Dormammu, in the guise of another of the Faltine, manipulates Clea into recruiting allies from the Lords of the Netherworlds to depose her mother. This frees Dormammu to reclaim his realm. He absorbs Umar and Mordo into himself, becoming more powerful than ever before, and he disintegrates the assembled entities.

Strange, at the time weakened without support from the "Principalities", confronts Dormammu with his allies Clea, the Silver Surfer, Hulk, and Ghost Rider, but they are unable to cause any injury to the villain. Strange journeys into the core of Dormammu's essence and uses the Eye of Agamotto to strip away his self-delusion, and make him acknowledge that his thirst for chaos, power, and conquest are unworthy of a being of his stature. Dormammu is momentarily shaken, and appears to be defeated, but this is only a mirage. The villain gloats that he has not shown "one tenth" of his true power against the heroes, but that he now realizes that rulership of "one puny" universe is beneath his notice, as he now has far greater and "more interesting" ambitions, and contemptuously dismisses the "insignificant mortals".

Dormammu observes the Guardians of the Galaxy—adventurers from the 31st century of Earth-691—travel to the mainstream era of Earth-616. Dormammu follows them back to their dimension, merges with his counterpart in this timeline, doubling his power, and attacks their headquarters, demanding the presence of the Doctor Strange of their time. Strange, now called the Ancient One, arrives with his disciple, the alien Krugarr, and battles Dormammu, assisted by the Guardians, the "Galactic Guardians", and the Phoenix Force. Dormammu kills the elderly Strange, and almost overwhelms his other foes, but is defeated when Krugarr summons the spirit of Strange, and they channel the combined power of everyone in the assembly to banish Dormammu to his home dimension.

Dormammu appears as the guiding force behind an attack on the self-titled Goddess during "The Infinity Crusade" storyline. During The Flight of the Bones storyline, Dormammu is revealed as the instigator behind a series of spontaneous combustions of criminals and an attack on an ally of Strange by cultists.

=== 2000s ===
Dormammu uses the demon lord Satannish (revealed as his creation) and warlock Nicholas Scratch to lead his Demonic armies to capture five of the inter-dimensional places of Hell, in a plot to eventually conquer all life and afterlife. Dormammu, however, is thwarted when the heroine Hellcat rallies the powers of Hell to weaken Dormammu by engineering a complete absence of mystic flame. Dormammu also allies with the entity Mephisto to drive an attacking force out of their respective dimensions.

Dormammu sends an army of Mindless Ones to attack the city of New York, and trick several prominent Marvel superheroes into unintentionally making him materialize on Earth by tricking them into combining dimensional energies in an attempt to dispel the Mindless Ones. Doctor Strange engages Dormammu in combat, and sends the hero Spider-Man back in time to a critical moment to stop his enemy from being able to re-enter Earth's universe, Spider-Man warning the heroes to delay in their attempts to stop the Mindless Ones long enough for the younger Strange to show up and banish them himself.

Dormammu returns, now in a symbiotic link with Umar. Together they petition the "Pan-dimensional Oversight Council" (counting Strange and Nightmare among its members) to perform a preemptive strike against Earth's superhumans, as "potential weapons of mass destruction", and when the petition fails, Dormammu eats most of the present council-members, whereas Umar reduces the rest to "screaming blobs of mindless jelly". The siblings then attack and overcome Eternity, and use the acquired power to remake all universes in their hellish image. The pair are opposed by a reuniting of some of the original Defenders (Strange, the Hulk, and Namor the Sub-Mariner), with Dormammu retreating when Umar steals his power. Dormammu also appears briefly during a storyline in which Strange contemplates his past.

Acting in secrecy, Dormammu empowers criminal mastermind the Hood, who in turn resurrects several dead supervillains and forms a crime army. When the Hood asks for information about his "benefactor" from the demoness Satana, she claims that Dormammu disposed of his sister off-page.

Dormammu temporarily takes control of the "zombie" virus that decimates Earth-2149, and also takes advantage of the fact that Strange loses the title of Sorcerer Supreme, but the latter eventually exorcises his influence from the Hood together with Daimon Hellstrom and Doctor Voodoo.

=== 2010s ===
Dormammu briefly appears when the newly appointed "Sorcerer Supreme" Doctor Voodoo enters his domain. The villain dismisses Voodoo as an "unworthy" opponent and refers to his vastly inferior "gutter gods". This, however, causes Voodoo to strengthen the seals to the entity's realm. Dormammu also appears as one of the prospective "suitors" (holders of a slave-contract) for the hand of Satana.

Dormammu appears in Uncanny X-Men. After Illyana Rasputin is pulled into Limbo it is revealed that Dormammu is responsible for taking over the realm. Dormammu is apparently killed by Illyana off-page.

Dormammu reappears with a plot to turn humanity into Mindless Ones, but is thwarted by Phil Coulson, Absorbing Man, and the Howling Commandos.

== Characteristics ==
=== Personality ===
Dormammu has been described as "something worse than a demon." It is unknown exactly how ancient he is, as he inhabits a wholly alien realm, separate from the rest of the Marvel Universe, that defies the laws of physics as understood on Earth. He is known to have already existed at the creation of the current demonic netherworlds; to have clashed with Agamotto hundreds of millions of years ago; to have served as the primary enemy of the Vishanti ever since; and to have been considered an extreme threat by the mages of "pre-cataclysm" Atlantis.

Dormammu is presented as the most powerful and malevolent of "the Faltine", higher-dimensional mystical energy beings. Not native to the "Dark Dimension", Dormammu and "his" sibling Umar were exiled for slaying their progenitor "Sinifer" and for their morbid/unclean obsession with physical matter. They journeyed to the Dark Dimension in search of experience, and assumed corporeal forms. Dormammu merged with the local "Flames of Regency" to further enhance his power, and returned to an energy state, whereas Umar had grown accustomed to physical pleasure. After imprisoning the horde of marauding virtually unstoppable Mindless Ones, Dormammu enslaved the entire realm and demanded worship as its sole deity. He continued to gradually merge other mystical universes to his own, while spreading his worship to any sorcerers throughout the multiverse who invoked his powers.

Dormammu is sometimes shown as incredibly patient, with certain plots to achieve his goals spanning billions of years, whereas others are planned far more recently or even improvised through opportunity. Although extremely intelligent, with tremendous knowledge of the mystic arts, he is overwhelmingly arrogant, generally does not adapt well to sudden confusion and unexpected developments, and has a tendency to gloat over technically outmatched foes rather than swiftly finish them off. What makes Dormammu different from other prominent Marvel supervillains is that he has been shown as fully capable of personally defeating cosmic entities, even without external power sources and outside of the "Dark Dimension".

Dormammu and his sister Umar have an unpredictable love-hate relationship. Sometimes loyal and collaborative, other times they gladly betray each other or take the other's power for themselves. Umar has an occasional tendency to sarcastically puncture her brother's obsessive histrionics with more pragmatic sadistic hedonism.

Writer Keith Giffen has described them as "Donnie and Marie from hell. The brother-sister sibling rivalry relationship blown up to nightmarish, universe-shattering proportions." Nevertheless, Dormammu is "completely inhuman", the kind of character that "commits mass murder... on a whim".

=== Powers and abilities ===
Dormammu is acknowledged by Doctor Strange as his "most terrible foe." He is described as a threat to "the life of the universe itself" that "at full power no one could stand against." He has been displayed approaching a universal or even multiversal scale of influence.

Dormammu can project energy bolts and beams. He is able to alter his size and teleport across dimensions. He can use his powers to travel through time. Dormammu can give a portion of his powers to others and turn them into powerful beings. The Hood tapped the powers of Dormammu to resurrect the dead. He is able to manipulate matter to alter and shape objects. Dormammu has the power to manipulate reality. Dormammu can possess the body of another being. He also appears to be immortal.

Dormammu is seemingly stronger in the Dark Dimension, as he is empowered by the worship of his followers.

== Reception ==
=== Critical response ===
Adam Holmes of CinemaBlend included Dormammu in their "10 Awesome Marvel Villains We Need To See In The MCU" list. Jamie Lovett of ComicBook.com ranked Dormammu first in their "5 Greatest Doctor Strange Villains" list. Trey Pasch of MovieWeb ranked Dormammu first in their "Doctor Strange: His Best Comic Book Villains" list. Rachel Ulatowski of The Mary Sue ranked Dormammu fourth in their "Strongest Marvel Villains" list. Chris Heasman of Looper ranked Dormammu fourth in their "Doctor Strange's Most Powerful Villains" list. IGN ranked Dormammu 56th in their "Top 100 Comic Book Villains" list.

Screen Rant included Dormammu in their "10 Best Characters Who Made Their Debut In Doctor Strange Comics" list, in their "Ghost Rider's 10 Greatest Enemies In The Comic Books" list, in their "10 Most Terrifying Demons In Marvel And DC Comics" list, and in their "15 Most Powerful Magical Beings In Marvel Comics" list. CBR.com ranked Dormammu second in their "11 Strongest Doctor Strange Villains" list, eighth in their "10 Most Powerful Comic Book Villains With Demonic Origins" list, and ninth in their "9 Darkest Characters Doctor Strange Fought In The Comics" list.

== Other versions ==
=== Marvel Mangaverse ===
An alternate universe version of Dormammu from Earth-2301 appears in Marvel Mangaverse.

=== Ultimate Marvel ===
An alternate universe version of Dormammu from Earth-1610 appears in Ultimate Marvel. After killing Doctor Strange's son, he is confronted by the Fantastic Four and transformed into a powerless human.

== In other media ==
=== Television ===
- Dormammu appears in the Spider-Woman episode "Realm of Darkness".
- Dormammu appears in Spider-Man: The Animated Series, voiced by Ed Gilbert. This version uses his servant Baron Mordo in attempts to free himself from the Dark Dimension, one included possession of Mary Jane Watson. The other includes Mordo bringing the Venom symbiote back to Earth and re-bonds it to Eddie Brock to assist Mordo. When Venom and Brock have a change of heart, Dormammu turns Cletus Kasady into Carnage to take Venom's place. Ultimately, Spider-Man, Iron Man, Brock, and Venom join forces to foil Dormammu's plans, with Brock and Venom sacrificing themselves to do so.
- Dormammu appears in The Super Hero Squad Show, voiced by Robert Englund.
- Dormammu appears in Ultimate Spider-Man, voiced by Phil LaMarr.
- Dormammu appears in Avengers Assemble, voiced again by Phil LaMarr.
- Dormammu appears in Hulk and the Agents of S.M.A.S.H., voiced again by Phil LaMarr.
- Dormammu appears in Marvel Disk Wars: The Avengers, voiced by Neil Kaplan.

=== Film ===
Dormammu as depicted in 2016 film Doctor Strange

- Dormammu appears in Doctor Strange: The Sorcerer Supreme, voiced by Jonathan Adams. This version seeks to gain access to the "main" reality via the Sanctum Santorum via comatose children and Mordo's help. After the Ancient One's death, Dr. Strange absorbs Dormammu and his army into the Eye of Agamotto, defeating him.
- Dormammu appears in Doctor Strange, voiced and motion-captured by Benedict Cumberbatch, blended with the voice of an unidentified British actor that director Scott Derrickson could not recall the name of. This version appears as a massive face made of rippling mystical energy who seeks to absorb all other universes into his Dark Dimension. Misinterpreting this eternal existence as longevity, Kaecilius and his zealots contact Dormammu for the use of his power and bring Earth into the Dark Dimension. However, Doctor Strange uses the Time Stone to trap himself and Dormammu in a time loop until the latter agrees to leave Earth and take the zealots with him in exchange for Strange breaking it.

=== Video games ===
- Dormammu appears as a playable character in Marvel vs. Capcom 3: Fate of Two Worlds, voiced by Michael T. Weiss.
- Dormammu appears as a playable character in Ultimate Marvel vs. Capcom 3, voiced again by Michael T. Weiss.
- Dormammu appears in Marvel Super Hero Squad Online.
- Dormammu appears as a non-playable character in Marvel: Avengers Alliance.
- Dormammu appears in Marvel Heroes, voiced by Robin Atkin Downes.
- Dormammu appears as a playable character and boss in Lego Marvel Super Heroes, voiced by Travis Willingham.
- Dormammu appears in Lego Marvel's Avengers via the "All-New All-Different Doctor Strange Pack" DLC.
- Dormammu appears as a playable character in Marvel: Future Fight.
- Dormammu appears as a playable character and boss in Marvel Contest of Champions.
- Dormammu appears as a playable character in Marvel vs. Capcom: Infinite, voiced again by Phil LaMarr. In the story mode, Ultron Sigma fuses the Marvel and Capcom universes. After the Dark Dimension is fused with the Darkstalkers' Makai Kingdom to form the Dark Kingdom, Dormammu allows Jedah Dohma to rule in his place; unwilling to confront him in battle for supremacy due to the merger weakening Dormammu.
- Dormammu appears as a non-playable character in Marvel Powers United VR, voiced again by Phil LaMarr.
- Dormammu appears as a playable character and boss in Lego Marvel Super Heroes 2.
- Dormammu appears as a boss in Marvel Ultimate Alliance 3: The Black Order, voiced again by Phil LaMarr. After the Reality Stone falls into his dimension, Dormammu uses it to brainwash Doctor Strange into opening rifts from the Dark Dimension to Earth. However, he is ultimately defeated and loses the Reality Stone and his physical form.
- Dormammu appears in Marvel Dimension of Heroes, voiced again by Phil LaMarr.
- Dormammu appears as a non-playable character in Marvel Future Revolution.
- Dormammu appears as a playable character in Marvel Strike Force.
