= Mister Rasputin =

Marvel Comics fictional character

Publication information
- Publisher: Marvel Comics
- First appearance: Strange Tales #145 (1966)
- Created by: Dennis O'Neil (writer); Steve Ditko (artist)

In-story information
- Full name: Pavel Rasputin
- Species: Human
- Notable aliases: Pavel Plotnick
- Abilities: Magic user Force-field generation Energy projection Teleportation

Pavel Plotnick (né Rasputin), better known as Mister Rasputin, is a fictional character, a super villain appearing in American comic books published by Marvel Comics. He is a sorcerer and alleged descendant of Grigori Rasputin who has fought Doctor Strange on occasion.

== Publication history ==
Mister Rasputin made his official debuts in June 1966's Strange Tales #145, which was edited by Stan Lee, written by Dennis O'Neil, drawn by Steve Ditko, and lettered by Artie Simek. The issue was a double feature, showcasing both Doctor Strange and Nick Fury.

== Fictional character biography ==
=== 1960s ===
An alleged descendant of Russian mystic Grigori Rasputin, Pavel Rasputin craves world domination. Adopting the moniker of Mister Rasputin, he starts to hone his sorcery skills, before stealing classified papers from various government sites. Aware of Rasputin's treachery, Doctor Strange tracks him down and fights him. However, having had already exhausted his reserves during his recent encounter with Tazza, Strange is unable to attack Rasputin full-force. Just as he is about to call upon his mystic cloak to subdue Rasputin, the villain withdraws a firearm and shoots the Sorcerer Supreme. Greatly weakened, Strange barely makes his way to the hospital, where he recuperates.

Not contented with his pseudo-victory, Rasputin sends an assassin to murder Strange. Using his astral form, Strange confronts Rasputin for the second time. This time, he is able to defeat him. Strange uses sorcery to remove all knowledge about magic from Rasputin's mind, before turning him in to the police.

=== 1980s ===
Reflecting on his own actions in prison, Rasputin decides to change his legal name to Pavel Plotnick. He relocates to Ohio and joins the insurance industry. Finding a wife, he fathers two children. His son Lamar later learns about the dark arts by accident. This newfound information allows him to capture Cloak. Plotnick discovers what has occurred and apologetically frees Cloak, before admonishing his son.

=== 2000s ===
During the Dark Reign storyline after Doctor Strange is stripped of his "Sorcerer Supreme" title because he utilized dark magic, the Eye of Agamotto greets Plotnick and proposes that he be a candidate for the vacant title.

=== 2010s ===
Operatives of Mys-Tech working for Commander Myrrden infiltrate the Sanctum Sanctorum, causing S.H.I.E.L.D. agent Phil Coulson to bring Rasputin in with a promise that if he helps them against Mys-Tech, his debt to S.H.I.E.L.D. will be paid. After placing spying charges in the Sanctum Sanctorum, Rasputin accompanies Coulson and Spider-Man into the Sanctum Sanctorum, where they defead the Mys-Tech agents. When Myrrden is defeated and the Book of Morphesti that was opened was closed, Rasputin removes the spell that was used on Wong. Coulson asks Spider-Man to stick around to make sure that Rasputin remains long enough for Coulson to get his release papers filled out.

During the "Death of Doctor Strange" storyline, Doctor Strange deals with Mister Rasputin, who senses that the Seven Sons of Cinnibus are dying as Strange severs the connection to keep them from entering his dimension.

== Powers and abilities ==
A mystic himself, Mister Rasputin was capable of energy manipulation, force-field generation, illusion creation, and teleportation.
