= Eyes of Buddha =

Symbol in Buddhist art

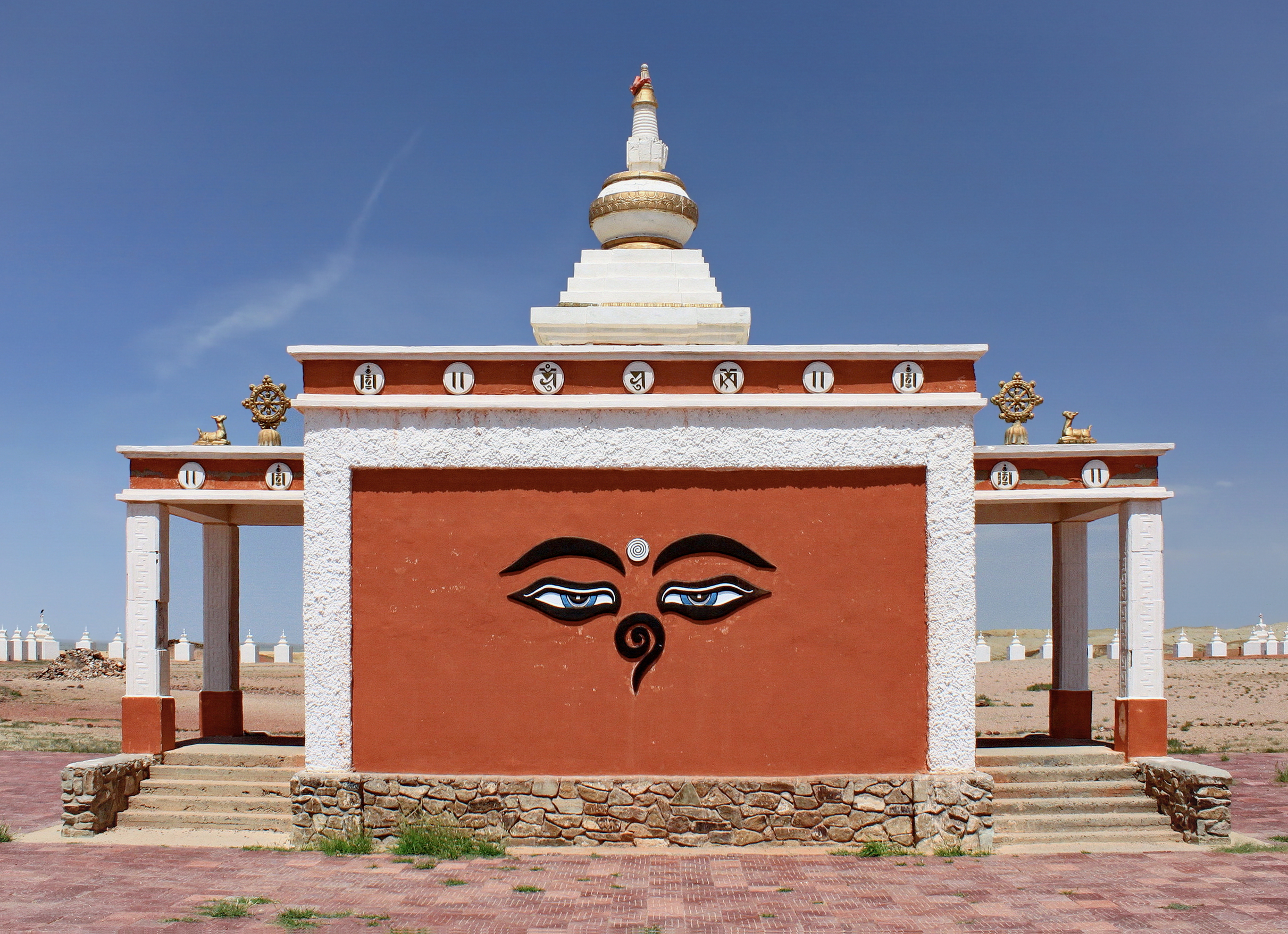
Eyes of Buddha adorned on a stupa in the Gobi Desert in the Dornogovi Province of Mongolia

The Eyes of Buddha (also called Buddha eyes or Wisdom eyes) is a symbol used in Buddhist art. The symbol depicts two half-closed eyes, a style sometimes referred to as the Adamantine View (Sanskrit: Vajradrsti). In between and slightly above the eyes is a circle or spiral which represents the urna, one of the thirty-two characteristics of a great man (Sanskrit: Mahāpuruṣalakṣaṇa) in Buddhism. Directly below the urna is a curly symbol stylized as १, which represents the number one in Devanagari numerals. The curly symbol, which represents either a nose or a divine fire emanating from the urna above, symbolizes unity.

The Eyes of Buddha symbol represents the all-seeing eyes of the Buddha, or sometimes more specifically represents the eyes of the Ādibuddha.

== On stupas ==
The Eyes of Buddha are painted onto the upper portions of many Tibetan-style stupas, mostly throughout Nepal. The symbol is painted on all four sides of the cube at the top of the stupa to symbolize the Buddha's wisdom seeing all things in all four cardinal directions. Two of the most well-known examples are the historic stupas at Swayambhunath and Boudhanath, which both comprise two of the seven Kathmandu Valley UNESCO World Heritage Site monuments located in Kathmandu in Nepal.

== Other uses ==
Similar to its use on stupas, the symbol is painted on the upper portion of many caityas. The symbol is also sometimes inscribed on mani stones alongside the Sanskrit mantra Om mani padme hum as a form of prayer in Tibetan Buddhism.

The Eyes of Buddha are painted on the silo housing the world's largest kaleidoscope, the Kaatskill Kaleidoscope in Mount Tremper, New York.
