= Kaatskill Kaleidoscope =

Coordinates: 42°2′57.3″N 74°17′13″W

The Kaatskill Kaleidoscope is the world's largest kaleidoscope, measuring 56 feet (17 m) in height. It is located in Mount Tremper, New York. It is housed in a converted grain silo. It was designed by 1960s psychedelic artist Isaac Abrams and his son Raphael. It cost $250,000 to build and required a 100 foot crane for its placement, opening in 1996. It is built with 3 mirrors measuring 37.5 feet (11.4 m) in diameter and weighing 2 ½ tons. Catskills developer Dean Gitter is credited with creating the concept for its construction.

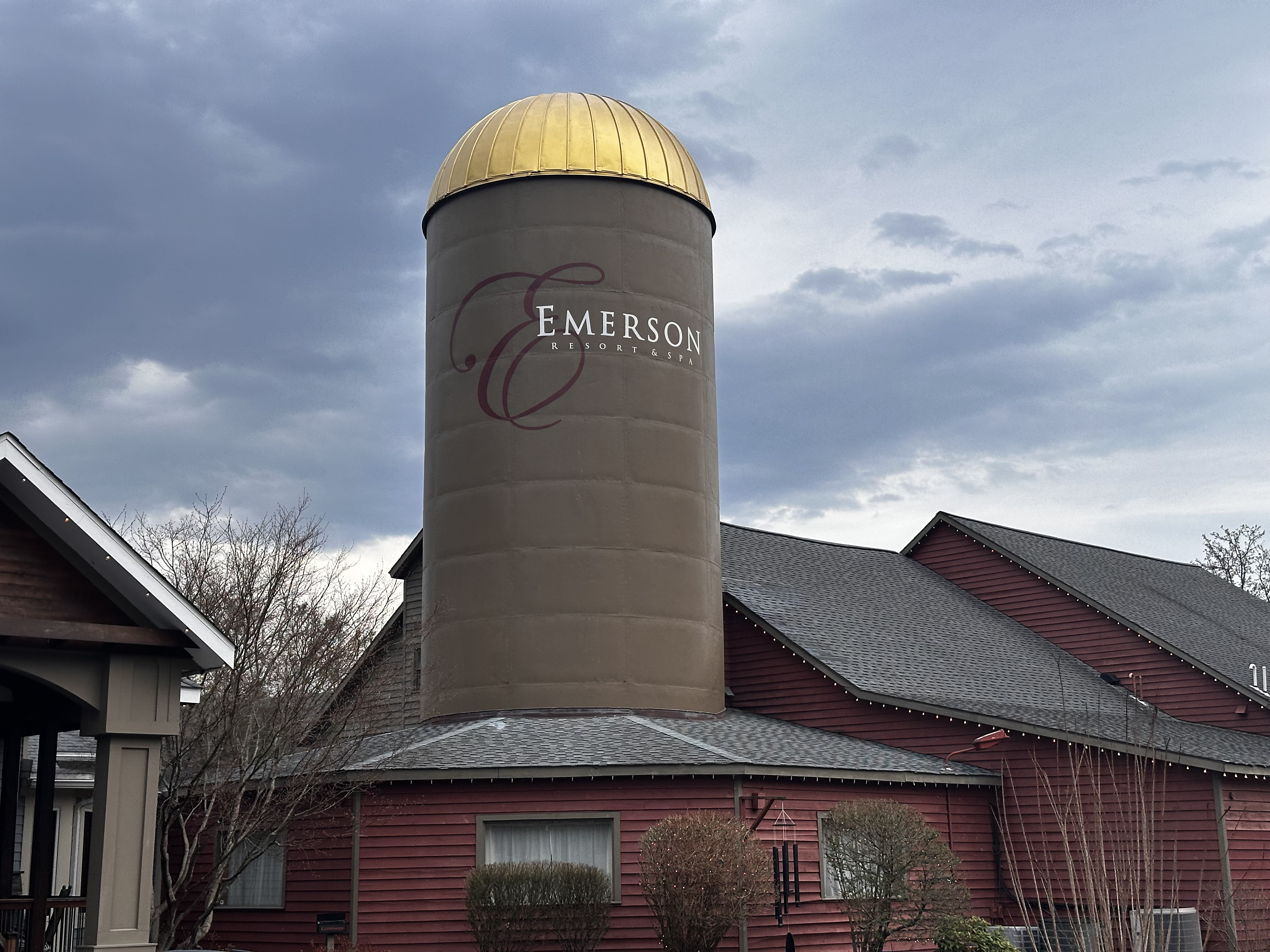
The silo of the Kaatskill Kaleidoscope in 2025

"Kaatskill" is the original spelling of "Catskill", as used by the 17th-century Dutch settlers in this area.

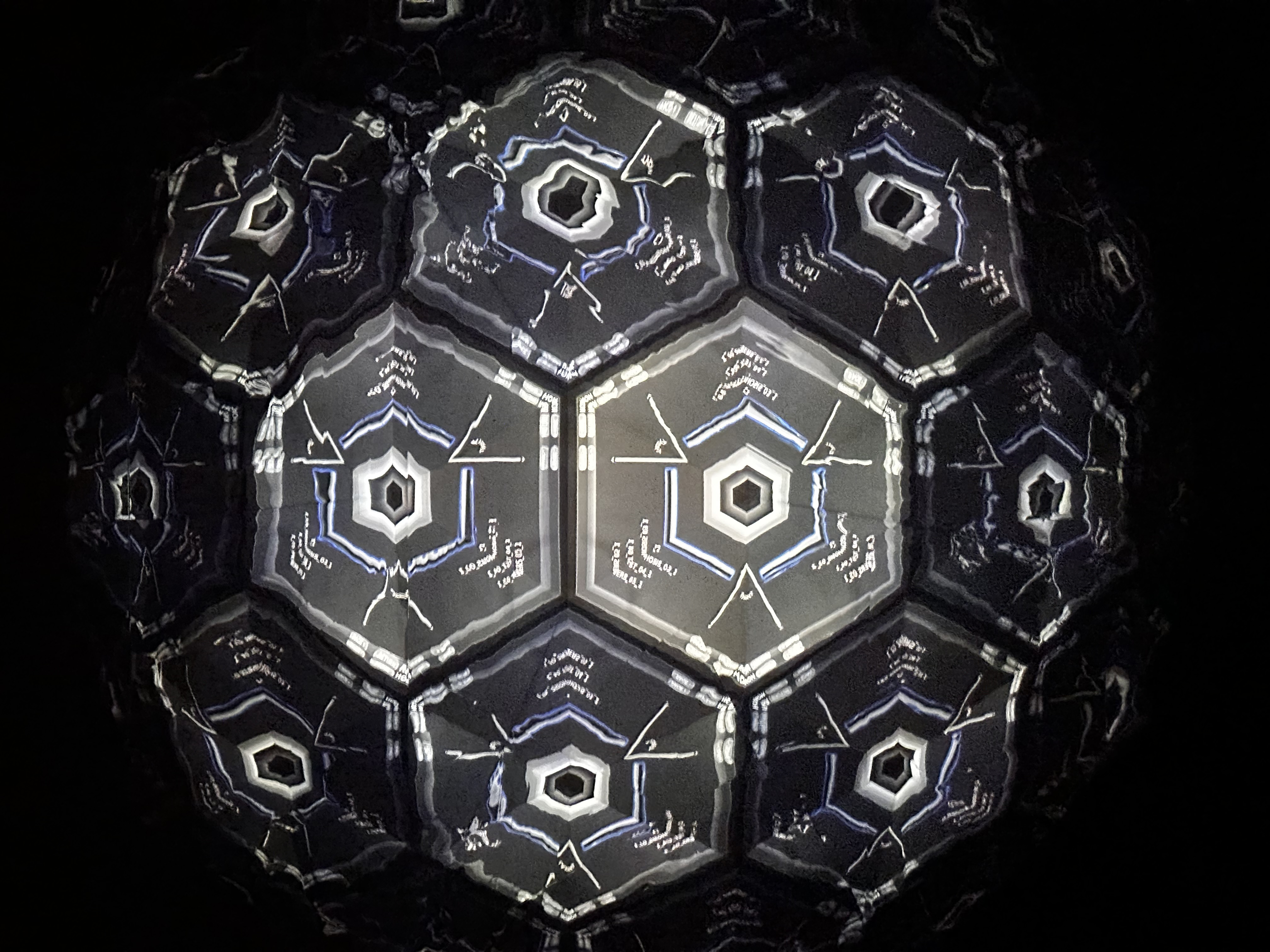
Kaatskill Kaleidoscope interior with pre-show screen

The Kaatskill Kaleidoscope attracts 25,000 annual visitors, and is partnered and shares a location with the Emerson Resort & Spa.

Images are projected through a screen and reflected by three mirrors into a spherical shape. Viewers lean against sloped padded boards that allow them to look up to the kaleidoscope.
