= Baron Mordo =

Marvel Comics fictional character

- Baron Mordo, Art by Paul Smith

Publication information
- Publisher: Marvel Comics
- First appearance: Strange Tales #111 (Aug. 1963)
- Created by: Stan Lee; Steve Ditko

In-story information
- Alter ego: Karl Amadeus Mordo
- Species: Human
- Abilities: Mastery of magic; Genius-level intellect; Skilled martial artist; Ability to conjure demons

Baron Karl Amadeus Mordo (known as Baron Mordo) is a character appearing in American comic books published by Marvel Comics, commonly as an adversary of Doctor Strange. The character was created by writer Stan Lee and artist Steve Ditko, and first appeared in Strange Tales #111 (August 1963). Baron Mordo is a gifted magician, especially adept in the black arts of magic, including summoning demons.

Karl Mordo was studying the magic arts under the Ancient One in Tibet when Dr. Stephen Strange arrived. Strange foiled Mordo's plot to kill the Ancient One, leading to Mordo being cast out and Strange eventually becoming Sorcerer Supreme. Mordo has since clashed several times with Dr. Strange, at times with the backing of the demon Dormammu, briefly even impersonating Strange.

The Baron Mordo character has appeared in other forms of media, such as animated television series, films, and video games. Chiwetel Ejiofor portrays the character in the Marvel Cinematic Universe film Doctor Strange (2016) and an alternate universe version in Doctor Strange in the Multiverse of Madness (2022).

== Publication history ==
Baron Mordo first appeared in Strange Tales #111 (August 1963), and was created by Stan Lee and Steve Ditko.

== Fictional character biography ==
A Transylvanian nobleman, Karl Mordo became a student of the Tibetan sorcerer known as the Ancient One. When Mordo plotted to kill his teacher, Dr. Stephen Strange learned of the plot. Mordo was forced to cast restraining spells to prevent Strange from warning the Ancient One. In desperation, Strange decided to accept the Ancient One's offer to take him on as his mentor in magic to have some hope of stopping Mordo. The Ancient One, however, was fully aware of Mordo's plot and of Strange's desire to warn him. Pleased at Strange's unselfish decision, the Ancient One's magical teachings immediately freed the doctor and explained the full situation. Thus informed in the face of his recent experiences, Strange agreed to become the Ancient One's apprentice despite the requirement that he abandon his former life. The Ancient One trained him to be a formidable opponent of Mordo. Eventually Mordo was exiled by the Ancient One. Mordo's abilities were similar to those of Doctor Strange, but Mordo was particularly skilled at astral projection and hypnosis, as well as mesmerism. He was more than willing to use powerful black magic and invoke demons, both of which Strange was reluctant or unable to do. Mordo's use of these darker arts would sometimes backfire.

The evil Mordo became an open foe of Doctor Strange. He sent his astral form to hypnotize the Ancient One's servant into poisoning his food, hoping the old man would reveal his secrets of magic. However, Strange tricked him into returning to his physical body after engaging in astral contact with him, thus breaking his hold over the servant, who helped the Ancient One to recover. Mordo disguised himself as Sir Clive Bentley, and trapped Strange with a drugged candle that paralyzed him, but Strange was able to use his mental powers to call a local girl to free him. He opposed Strange's discipleship to the Ancient One.

Mordo makes a deal with his new master, Dormammu, to amass additional power to defeat Doctor Strange. Mordo sells his soul to both Mephisto and Satannish for power, gaming that Strange would save him.

Mordo contracts terminal cancer as a side effect of his use of black magic, and renounces evil just before his death. He later returned to life. Mordo allies with Terrax, Tiger Shark and Red Hulk as the "Offenders", to be opposed by Doctor Strange and the three original Defenders.

During the "Secret Empire" storyline, Baron Mordo becomes the caretaker of Manhattan after it is surrounded by Darkforce following Hydra's takeover of the United States. He uses the Sanctum Sanctorum as his residence and has the Elder God Pluorrg guard it. He later catches Daredevil, Luke Cage, Cloak and Iron Fist when they are attempting to fight him. Mordo is defeated by Doctor Strange, Spider-Woman, Ben Urich, and Kingpin.

== Powers and abilities ==
Baron Mordo has vast magical abilities derived from his years of studying black magic and the mystic arts. He can manipulate magical forces for a variety of effects, including hypnotism, thought-casting, and illusion casting. He can separate his astral form from his body, allowing him to become intangible and invisible to most beings. He can project deadly force blasts using magic, can teleport inter-dimensionally, and can manipulate many forms of magical energy. He can tap extra-dimensional energy by invoking entities or objects of power existing in dimensions tangential to Earth's through the recitation of spells. He can also summon demons, but often does not have enough power to force them to do what he wants them to do.

Baron Mordo has some knowledge of a karate-like martial art form, and has an extensive knowledge of magical lore.

== In other media ==
=== Television ===
- Baron Mordo appears in Spider-Man: The Animated Series, voiced by Tony Jay.
- Baron Mordo appears in The Super Hero Squad Show, voiced by Dave Boat. This version was imprisoned in a magic soda can sometime prior to the series.
- Baron Mordo appears in Ultimate Spider-Man, voiced by Danny Jacobs.
- Baron Mordo appears in the Avengers Assemble episode "The Eye of Agamotto", voiced by Phil LaMarr. This version works as a magical advisor to Hydra and resembles his MCU counterpart.
- Baron Mordo appears in the Spider-Man (2017) episode "Amazing Friends", voiced by Leonard Roberts. This version has been recruited by Advanced Idea Mechanics to merge sorcery with technology.

=== Film ===
Chiwetel Ejiofor as Karl Mordo in Doctor Strange (2016)

- Mordo appears in Doctor Strange: The Sorcerer Supreme, voiced by Kevin Michael Richardson. This version is depicted as more warrior-like than his traditional incarnation. His lust for battle and disregard for the lives of others disgusts the Ancient One, who rejects him as a candidate for becoming the Sorcerer Supreme. Mordo then pledges his service to Dormammu and kills the Ancient One, but is later defeated by Doctor Strange and eaten by Dormammu for his failure.
- Karl Mordo appears in films set in the Marvel Cinematic Universe (MCU), portrayed by Chiwetel Ejiofor.
  - Introduced in Doctor Strange (2016), this version is a zealous member of the Masters of the Mystic Arts who trains Stephen Strange, wields the Staff of the Living Tribunal, and is noted by the Ancient One as being unable to recognize the need for moral flexibility and compromise. A disillusioned Mordo eventually deserts Strange and begins targeting sorcerers for "abusing" their power.
  - An alternate universe variant of Mordo from Earth-838 appears in Doctor Strange in the Multiverse of Madness. This version is a member of the Illuminati who replaced Strange as the Sorcerer Supreme after he was executed for using the Darkhold.

=== Video games ===
- Baron Mordo appears in Marvel: Ultimate Alliance, voiced by Philip Proctor. This version is a member of Doctor Doom's Masters of Evil and serves as one of his lieutenants.
- Baron Mordo appears as a boss and unlockable character in Marvel: Avengers Alliance.
- Baron Mordo appears in Lego Marvel's Avengers via the "All-New All-Different Doctor Strange" DLC pack.
- Baron Mordo appears in Marvel: Future Fight.
- Baron Mordo appears as a playable character in Marvel: Contest of Champions.
- Baron Mordo appears as a playable character in Marvel Puzzle Quest.
- Baron Mordo, based on the MCU incarnation, appears as a playable character in Lego Marvel Super Heroes 2.
- Baron Mordo appears in Marvel Future Revolution.
