= List of Nick Fury comics =

- Cover to issue 7 of the Nick Fury, Agent of S.H.I.E.L.D. series from 1968, art by Jim Steranko.
Primary titles
| Title | Series | Singles | Issues |
| Sgt. Fury and his Howling Commandos | 1 | 8 | 167 |
| Nick Fury, Agent of S.H.I.E.L.D. | 3 | 0 | 99 |
| Wolverine/Nick Fury | 0 | 3 | 3 |
| Fury | 3 | 1 | 25 |
- Footnotes

These are tiles about the characters of Nick Fury, Nick Fury Jr., Ultimate Nick Fury or any other alternative version of the character published by Marvel Comics.

== Ongoing series ==
- Sgt. Fury and his Howling Commandos (1963)
- Nick Fury, Agent of S.H.I.E.L.D.
  - Nick Fury, Agent of S.H.I.E.L.D. (1968)
  - Nick Fury, Agent of S.H.I.E.L.D. (1989)
- Nick Fury's Howling Commandos (2005)
- Secret Warriors (2009)
- Nick Fury (2017)

== Limited series ==
- Nick Fury vs. S.H.I.E.L.D. (1988)
- Fury of S.H.I.E.L.D. (1995)
- Fury/Agent 13 (1998)
- Fury (2001)
- Fury: Peacemaker (2006)
- The Incredible Hulk: The Fury Files (2008)
- Avengers 1959 (2011)
- Fury: My War Gone By (2012)
- Fury's Big Week (2012)

== Annuals and specials ==
- Sgt. Fury and his Howling Commandos Special King Size Annual 1 (1965)
- Sgt. Fury and his Howling Commandos Special King-Size Special 2 (1966)
- Sgt. Fury and his Howling Commandos Special King-Size Special 3 (1967)
- Sgt. Fury and his Howling Commandos Special King-Size Special 4 (1968)
- Sgt. Fury and his Howling Commandos Special King-Size Special 5 (1969)
- Sgt. Fury and his Howling Commandos Special King-Size Special 6 (1970)
- Sgt. Fury and his Howling Commandos Special King-Size Special 7 (1971)
- Sgt. Fury and his Howling Commandos: Shotgun Opera (2009)

== Graphic novels and one-shots ==
- Wolverine/Nick Fury
  - The Scorpio Connection (1989)
  - Bloody Choices (1991)
  - Scorpio Rising (1994)
- Fury (1994)
- Fury/Black Widow: Death Duty (1995)
- Captain America and Nick Fury: Blood Truce (1995)
- Captain America and Nick Fury: The Otherworld War (2001)
- Nick Fury: Spies Like Us (2008)
- Fury: S.H.I.E.L.D. 50th Anniversary (2015)
- Fury (2023)

== Comic strips ==
- Nick Fury, Agent of S.H.I.E.L.D., a comic book strip that was published in black and white in the UK Hulk Comic (1979)

== As a feature in an anthology comic ==
- Nick Fury, Agent of S.H.I.E.L.D. in Strange Tales (1965)

== Other ==
- Punisher/Fury: Rules of the Game, (solicited and made but never released)

== Collected editions ==
- Marvel Masterworks: Sgt. Fury
  - Vol. 1 collects Sgt. Fury and his Howling Commandos #1-13, 320 pages, February 2006, ISBN 978-0-7851-2039-1
  - Vol. 2 collects Sgt. Fury and his Howling Commandos #14-23 and Annual #1, 240 pages, June 2008, ISBN 978-0-7851-2928-8
  - Vol. 3 collects Sgt. Fury and his Howling Commandos #24-32 and Annual #2, 224 pages, August 2010, ISBN 978-0-7851-4212-6
- Essential Sgt Fury Vol. 1 collects Sgt. Fury and his Howling Commandos #1-23 and Annual #1, 544 pages, November 2011, ISBN 978-0-7851-6395-4
- Son of Origins of Marvel Comics includes Nick Fury, Agent of S.H.I.E.L.D. story from Strange Tales #135, 249 pages, October 1975, ISBN 978-0-671-22166-9
- Marvel Masterworks: Nick Fury, Agent of S.H.I.E.L.D.
  - Vol. 1 collects Strange Tales #135-153, Tales of Suspense #78, and Fantastic Four #21, 288 pages, September 2007, ISBN 978-0-7851-2686-7
  - Vol. 2 collects Strange Tales #154-168 and Nick Fury, Agent of S.H.I.E.L.D. #1-3, 272 pages, December 2009, ISBN 978-0-7851-3503-6
  - Vol. 3 collects Nick Fury, Agent of S.H.I.E.L.D. #4-15, The Avengers #72, and Marvel Spotlight #31, 320 pages, December 2011, ISBN 978-0-7851-5034-3
- S.H.I.E.L.D.: The Complete Collection Omnibus collects Strange Tales #135-168, Nick Fury, Agent of S.H.I.E.L.D. #1-15, Fantastic Four #21, Tales of Suspense #78, The Avengers #72, and Marvel Spotlight #31, 960 pages, October 2015, ISBN 978-0-7851-9852-9
- Marvel Comics Presents: Nick Fury vs. S.H.I.E.L.D. collects Nick Fury vs. S.H.I.E.L.D. #1-6, 1989
- S.H.I.E.L.D.: Nick Fury vs. S.H.I.E.L.D. collects Nick Fury vs. S.H.I.E.L.D. #1-6, 304 pages, December 2011, ISBN 978-0-7851-5901-8
- Nick Fury, Agent of S.H.I.E.L.D. Classic
  - Vol. 1 collects Nick Fury, Agent of S.H.I.E.L.D. vol. 3 #1-11, 272 pages, July 2012, ISBN 978-0-7851-6064-9
  - Vol. 2 collects Nick Fury, Agent of S.H.I.E.L.D. vol. 3 #12-23, 288 pages, February 2015, ISBN 978-0-7851-9345-6
  - Vol. 3 collects Nick Fury, Agent of S.H.I.E.L.D. vol. 3 #24-38, 288 pages, June 2015, ISBN 978-0-7851-9408-8
- Secret Warriors Vol. 1: Nick Fury, Agent of Nothing collects Secret Warriors #1-6, 184 pages, September 2009, ISBN 978-0-7851-3999-7

== See also ==
- Nick Fury, Agent of S.H.I.E.L.D.: Empyre, a 2000 prose novel by Will Murray
- S.H.I.E.L.D., the fictional Marvel Comics espionage agency
- List of S.H.I.E.L.D. members
