= Nick Fury (disambiguation) =

Nick Fury is a fictional character appearing in American comic books published by Marvel Comics.

Nick Fury may also refer to:

- Nick Fury (Marvel Cinematic Universe), character in the Marvel Cinematic Universe, portrayed by Samuel L. Jackson
- Nick Fury (Ultimate Marvel character), character in the Ultimate Marvel Universe comics
- Nick Fury Jr., the original Nick Fury's son
- Nick Fury, Agent of S.H.I.E.L.D. (feature), a feature in Strange Tales
- Nick Fury, Agent of S.H.I.E.L.D. (comic book), a comic book title starring Nick Fury
- Nick Fury (comic book), a 2017 comic book starring Nick Fury Jr.
- Nick Fury: Agent of S.H.I.E.L.D. (film), a television film starring David Hasselhoff
- Nicholas Loftin, American record producer known by the nickname "Nick Fury"
- Nikkfurie, a member of the French hip hop duo La Caution

== See also ==
- List of Nick Fury comics
