= Nick Fury, Agent of S.H.I.E.L.D. (disambiguation) =

Nick Fury, Agent of S.H.I.E.L.D. is a Marvel Comics title featuring Nick Fury.

Nick Fury, Agent of S.H.I.E.L.D. may also refer to:

- Nick Fury: Agent of S.H.I.E.L.D. (film), a television film based on the comic and starring David Hasselhoff
- Nick Fury, Agent of S.H.I.E.L.D. (comics), other comics bearing the title
  - Nick Fury, Agent of S.H.I.E.L.D. (feature), the original Strange Tales feature for the title
  - Nick Fury, Agent of S.H.I.E.L.D. (1968 series), the first ongoing series for the character
  - Nick Fury, Agent of S.H.I.E.L.D. (1989 series), the second ongoing series for the character
  - Nick Fury, Agent of S.H.I.E.L.D. (comic strip), a Marvel Comics strip featuring the character

== See also ==
- Nick Fury
- List of S.H.I.E.L.D. members
