= Mike Friedrich =

American comic book writer and publisher (born 1949)

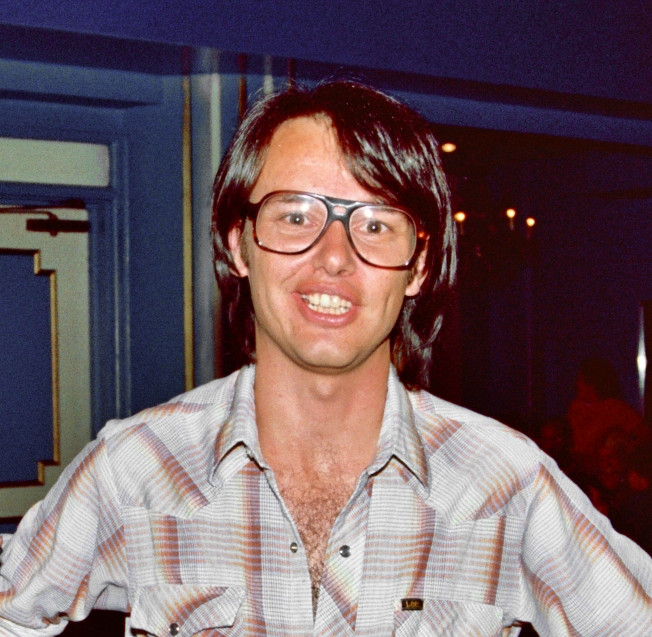
- Friedrich in 1982
- Born: March 27, 1949 (age 77)
- Areas: Writer, Publisher
- Notable works: Iron Man; Justice League of America; Star*Reach
- Awards: Inkpot Award (1980); Bill Finger Award (2019)

Mike Friedrich (/ˈfriːdrɪk/; born March 27, 1949) is an American comic book writer and publisher best known for his work at Marvel and DC Comics, and for publishing the anthology series Star*Reach, one of the first independent comics. He was also an artists' representative.

His notable works include runs as the regular writer of DC's Justice League of America and Marvel's Iron Man.

== Biography ==
=== Early life and career ===
The Spectre #3 (April 1968): Friedrich's first published work. Cover art by Neal Adams.

Mike Friedrich, who is unrelated to fellow Silver Age of Comics writer Gary Friedrich, entered comics professionally after years of writing to DC letter columns in the 1960s and developing a mail acquaintanceship with the famously responsive editor Julius Schwartz. "My letter-writing began around the time the 'new look' Batman was introduced, though I'd been a fan of Julie's for two or three years before then. A couple of years later it turned into a bit of correspondence as Julie began to send short replies," Friedrich recalled. Schwartz, after rejecting an Elongated Man story Friedrich submitted, bought Friedrich's first professional script on May 10, 1967, a 10-page Robin backup story ("Menace of the Motorcycle Marauders", drawn by penciler Chic Stone and inker Joe Giella) and eventually published in Batman #202 (cover-dated June 1968) as Friedrich's third published comics story.

Friedrich used the $10-per-page payment to visit New York City the following month, after his high school graduation, and took a DC Comics tour in order to meet Schwartz in person. "That first summer," Friedrich recalled, "he worked with me on a handful of scripts, including the one that was first to be published, The Spectre #3" (April 1968; reprinted in Adventure Comics Digest #496, Feb. 1983), in which Friedrich teamed with artist Neal Adams on the 25-page supernatural superhero story, "Menace of the Mystic Mastermind". Almost immediately afterward, the same month, Friedrich published the full-length Batman story "The Man Who Radiated Fear", penciled by Stone ghosting for Bob Kane, in Batman #200 (March 1968).

=== DC and Marvel Comics ===
Friedrich quickly began writing stories for a number of DC publications, including Challengers of the Unknown, Detective Comics, The Flash and Teen Titans. With penciler Jerry Grandenetti in Showcase #80 (Feb. 1969), he reintroduced the supernatural-mystery story narrator the Phantom Stranger, created by John Broome and Carmine Infantino in 1952. He wrote the 30th anniversary Batman story in Detective Comics #387 (May 1969) which was drawn by Bob Brown. Friedrich's first extended run on a title was on the superhero-team series Justice League of America from #86–99 (Dec. 1970 – June 1972); in the story "The Most Dangerous Dreams of All" in issue #89 (May 1971), he himself makes a cameo appearance and breaks the fourth wall at a time when such experimentation in the mainstream was rare. He had previously scripted "His Name Is... Kane", in House of Mystery #180 (June 1969), in which the short tale's penciler, Gil Kane, stars as an artist drawing for DC Comics and venturing into the physical House of Mystery. Friedrich co-created Merlyn in Justice League of America #94 (Nov. 1971) and the character was adapted into the Arrow TV series in 2012.

Star*Reach #7 (Jan. 1977): Cover by Barry Windsor-Smith.

Moving to Marvel after four years, Friedrich scripted every issue of Iron Man but three from #48–81 (July 1972 – Dec. 1975). In issue #55 (Feb. 1973), he co-scripted the introduction of the popular characters Thanos and Drax the Destroyer, created and co-scripted by artist Jim Starlin.

Other work includes issues of Marvel's Captain America, Captain Marvel, where he worked with artist Jim Starlin on the latter's transition to writer on an acclaimed run of that series, The Power of Warlock, "Ka-Zar" in Astonishing Tales, "Ant-Man" in Marvel Feature, and The Outlaw Kid, writing a short-lived revival of Doug Wildey's Western series from Marvel's 1950s predecessor, Atlas Comics.

=== Star*Reach ===
Friedrich's most notable contribution may be his 1970s anthology series Star*Reach, a forerunner of the independently produced comics that proliferated, beginning in the 1980s, with the rise of the "direct market" of comic-book stores. Star*Reach styled itself as a "ground-level" comic book – not an underground comix publication, but also not mainstream or "overground". Eighteen issues were released between 1974 and 1979, with Friedrich's same-name publishing company expanding to other series, including Quack; Imagine; and Lee Marrs' Pudge, Girl Blimp, along with a number of one-shot comics, before closing down.

Comics historian Richard J. Arndt wrote in 2006 that Star*Reach

...was an independent comic, long before anyone seriously mentioned or had even really conceived of an indy market that could challenge the major publishers. At its beginning, Star*Reach sold through the few comic shops around, as well as head shops, or via subscriptions and mail order. ... [It] published mostly science fiction and fantasy stories, at a time when the conventional wisdom was that those genres didn't sell. Plus, they were intelligent science fiction stories. If you read Tolkien or Heinlein or Bester or Le Guin, these stories fit right in. ... Michael T. Gilbert, John Workman, Lee Marrs, Robert Gould, Dave Sim, Ken Steacy, Dean Motter, Gene Day and Paul Kirchner got their first major exposure here. ... Howard Chaykin's Cody Starbuck and Gideon Faust characters both demonstrated what Chaykin was really capable of, long before the mainstream allowed him the same creative freedom.

Friedrich closed Star*Reach as a publisher in 1979, worked for two years at Marvel Comics as their Direct Sales Manager, and then reopened Star*Reach as a talent agency in 1982. In the 2000s, Friedrich served as Chair of the National Legislative Committee for the Graphic Artists Guild, while a member of the California/Northern chapter.

== WonderCon ==
Friedrich, in partnership with Joe Field, owned and operated the San Francisco Bay Area comic book convention WonderCon for 15 years before selling it to Comic-Con International in 2001.

== Awards ==
Friedrich received an Inkpot Award at the 1980 San Diego Comic-Con.

In 2019, Friedrich was awarded the Bill Finger Award to recognize his contributions to the industry.

In 2026, Friedrich was selected for inclusion in the Eisner Hall of Fame.

== Personal life ==
Mike Friedrich is the spouse of Lee Marrs, a cartoonist and animator, who was also a frequent contributor to Star*Reach. He became an ordained deacon in the United Methodist Church at the Pacific School of Religion.

== Bibliography ==
=== Atlas/Seaboard Comics ===
- Wulf the Barbarian #4 (1975)

=== DC Comics ===
- Batman #200, 219, 221–222, 225 (Batman lead stories); #202, 227, 229–231, 234–236, 239–242 (Robin backup stories) (1968–1972)
- Challengers of the Unknown #66 (1969)
- Detective Comics #384–385 (Batgirl backup stories); #386, 390–391, 402–403 (Robin backup stories); #387 (Batman lead story) (1969–1970)
- The Flash #186, 195, 197–198, 207 (1969–1971)
- Forbidden Tales of Dark Mansion #6 (1972)
- Green Lantern #61, 73–74 (1968–1970)
- House of Mystery #180 (1969)
- House of Secrets #81, 90 (1969–1971)
- Justice League of America #86–92, 94–99 (1970–1972)
- Our Army at War #207, 217, 227, 236 (1969–1971)
- Phantom Stranger vol. 2 #1–3 (1969)
- Showcase #80 (Phantom Stranger) (1969)
- Spectre #3, 9 (1968–1969)
- Superman #255 (World of Krypton backup story) (1972)
- Teen Titans #19 (1969)
- The Witching Hour #7 (1970)
- World's Finest Comics #200, 209 (1971–1972)

=== Marvel Comics ===
- Adventure into Fear #20 (Morbius, the Living Vampire) (1974)
- Astonishing Tales #16–20 (Ka-Zar) (1973)
- Captain America #171 (1974)
- Captain Marvel #24, 26–28, 35 (1973–1974)
- Dracula Lives #7 (1974)
- Iron Man #48–55, 58–75, 77, 79–81 (1972–1975)
- Ka-Zar vol. 2 #1–5 (1974)
- Marvel Feature #4–7, 8 (four page framing sequence only), 9–10 (Ant Man); #12 (The Thing and Iron Man) (1972–1973)
- Marvel Super Action #1 (Bobbi Morse/Huntress) (1976)
- Outlaw Kid #10–12 (1972)
- Sgt. Fury and his Howling Commandos #114 (1973)
- Strange Tales #176–177 (Golem) (1974)
- Sub-Mariner #54, 56 (1972)
- Warlock #3–4, 7–8 (1972–1973)
- Werewolf by Night #16–19 (1974)
- Western Gunfighters #4–5 (1971)

=== Skywald Publications ===
- Butch Cassidy #1 (1971)
- Nightmare #1 (1970)

=== Star Reach ===
- Imagine #1–5 (1978–1979)
- Parsifal #1 (1978)
- Quack #1–6 (1976–1977)
- Star Reach #2–5, 7–8, 10–14, 16–18 (1975–1979)
- Within Our Reach #1 (1991)

Preceded by Robert Kanigher	Justice League of America writer 1970–1972	Succeeded by Len Wein
Preceded by Gary Friedrich	Iron Man writer 1972–1973	Succeeded by Steve Gerber
Preceded by Steve Gerber	Iron Man writer 1973–1975	Succeeded by Len Wein
