= Wolverine/Nick Fury: Scorpio Rising =

1994 graphic novel

- Date: 1994
- Main characters: Wolverine, Nick Fury and Mikel Fury
- Series: Marvel Graphic Novel
- Publisher: Marvel Comics

Creative team
- Writers: Howard Chaykin
- Artists: Shawn McManus
- Letterers: Chris Eliopoulos
- Colourists: Gloria Vasquez

Original publication
- Date of publication: 1994
- Language: English

Chronology
- Preceded by: Wolverine: Bloody Choices

Wolverine/Nick Fury: Scorpio Rising, sometimes just known as Scorpio Rising is a graphic novel published by American company Marvel Comics in 1994.

== Publication history ==
The story was reprinted in Wolverine & Nick Fury: Scorpio in 2012, which contains the three stories of the Wolverine/Nick Fury trilogy, Wolverine/Nick Fury: The Scorpio Connection and Wolverine: Bloody Choices being the other two.

== Plot ==
Fury's son, Mikel, is having a hard time training to become S.H.I.E.L.D. agent and soon he's seduced away by the cry of his homeland, Carpassia, which is undergoing revolution. He takes the Cosmic Key and heads for Carpassia, where HYDRA is using LMDs to wage war and to bait Mikel so Hydra steal the Key from him. Fury and Wolverine team up again to set Scorpio straight and free the country of HYDRA. It is later revealed that Mikel is the heir to the Carpassian throne from before the country was taken over by the Soviet Union. After Hydra is defeated, he runs for president and wins the election.

== Collected editions ==
The trilogy was originally collected as in the following trade paperback.

Title	Material collected	Publication date	ISBN
Wolverine & Nick Fury: Scorpio	Wolverine/Nick Fury: The Scorpio Connection; Wolverine: Bloody Choices; Wolverine/Nick Fury: Scorpio Rising	April 4, 2012	978-0785153481

The trilogy was also later reprinted in the Marvel Epic Collection of Wolverine.

Title	Vol.	Vol. title	Material collected	Publication date	ISBN
Wolverine Epic Collection	2	Back to Basics	Wolverine (vol. 2) #17–30; Wolverine/Nick Fury: The Scorpio Connection; Wolverine: The Jungle Adventure	March 2019	978-1302916091
Wolverine Epic Collection	3	Blood and Claws	Wolverine (vol. 2) #31–44 (1988), Wolverine: Bloodlust (1990) 1, Wolverine: Bloody Choices (1991) 1	July 2021	978-1302930899
Wolverine Epic Collection	7	To the Bone	Wolverine (vol. 2) #76-86; Wolverine: Evilution; Wolverine & Nick Fury: Scorpio Rising; Ghost Rider, Wolverine, Punisher: The Dark Design; Cable #16	June 2023	

== Reception ==
The book was the third American highest selling trade-paperback of 1994.

SuperMegaMonkey of Comics Chronology stated that, despite being a sequel to The Scorpio Connection, it does not really delve into the Scorpio history any further; Howard Chaykin also drew the Scorpio Connection but did not get any writing credits for it and probably felt some ownership or connection with the characters. However, according to him, Scorpio Rising is just a general spy adventure story.

== See also ==
- Nick's World
- 1994 in comics
