= Wolverine: Bloody Choices =

1991 graphic novel

- Second edition cover by Michael Avon Oeming and Joe Jusko (1993)
- Date: June 1991
- Main characters: Wolverine and Nick Fury
- Series: Marvel Graphic Novel
- Page count: 64 pages
- Publisher: Marvel Comics

Creative team
- Writers: Tom DeFalco
- Artists: John Buscema
- Pencillers: John Buscema
- Inkers: John Buscema
- Letterers: Janice Chiang
- Colourists: Gregory A. Wright
- Editors: Chris DeFelippo; Dawn Geiger; Pat Garrahy; Ralph Macchio (Note: Macchio also wrote the foreword.)
- ISBN: 978-0871359803

Chronology
- Preceded by: Wolverine/Nick Fury: The Scorpio Connection
- Followed by: Wolverine/Nick Fury: Scorpio Rising

Wolverine: Bloody Choices is a graphic novel published in 1991 by American company Marvel Comics, the second part of the Wolverine/Nick Fury trilogy. The story involves Wolverine taking an oath to protect a boy from an international criminal named Bullfinch, despite a plea deal with Nick Fury granting him (Bullfinch) immunity in exchange for crucial testimony.

== Publication history ==
The book was republished in November 1993 and collected in Marvel Comic Exklusiv nr 17 in 1992 and again in Wolverine & Nick Fury: Scorpio in 2012.

== Synopsis ==
During a vacation in Hawaii, Wolverine intervenes when a young boy tries to kill a man named Mr. Bullfinch, a local crime lord, but is attacked by Bullfinch's bodyguard, Shiv, who is implied to possibly be Wolverine's brother. Wolverine takes the boy to a doctor he knows, and learns he has been sexually abused by Bullfinch, who still has the boy's brother imprisoned. Wolverine tries to track down Bullfinch but finds Shiv waiting for him, and after escaping, is joined by Nick Fury, who is in town to take down Bullfinch. Together, they attack Bullfinch's mansion, and Wolverine battles Shiv once again. Bullfinch ultimately escapes, but Wolverine's continuous pursuit convinces him to make a deal with S.H.I.E.L.D. This upsets Wolverine, who wants Bullfinch to pay for his crimes, particularly the ones involving children, with his death, but Fury insists they can save more lives by letting Bullfinch live and give them information. After finding the S.H.I.E.L.D. safehouse where Bullfinch is being held, Wolverine and Fury comes to blows, with Fury fighting his best to keep his promise to protect Bullfinch but Wolverine ultimately prevailing, after which he chases down Bullfinch and kills him.

== Reception ==
SuperMegaMonkey of Comics Chronology stated that the implied storyline with the character of Shiv felt cheap, and that DeFalco's treatment of Wolverine felt like an exaggeration of the character's tropes to the point of parody, one which ignored the character arc with which Uncanny X-Men writer Chris Claremont had done in establishing Wolverine's struggle to contain his berserker rages. He did conclude however that the book "isn't terrible", with Buscema's art serving as a saving grace. Andrew Young of Geek Hard stated that the book features one of the absolutely greatest fight scenes in all of comics and that the scene should also be counted among the greatest Nick Fury moments of all time.

== Collected editions ==
The entire trilogy was originally collected in the following trade paperback.

Title	Material collected	Publication date	ISBN
Wolverine & Nick Fury: Scorpio	Wolverine/Nick Fury: The Scorpio Connection; Wolverine: Bloody Choices; Wolverine/Nick Fury: Scorpio Rising	April 4, 2012	978-0785153481

The overall trilogy was also reprinted in the Marvel Epic Collection of Wolverine.

Title	Vol.	Vol. title	Material collected	Publication date	ISBN
Wolverine Epic Collection	2	Back to Basics	Wolverine (vol. 2) #17–30; Wolverine/Nick Fury: The Scorpio Connection; Wolverine: The Jungle Adventure	March 2019	978-1302916091
Wolverine Epic Collection	3	Blood and Claws	Wolverine (vol. 2) #31–44 (1988), Wolverine: Bloodlust (1990) 1, Wolverine: Bloody Choices (1991) 1	July 2021	978-1302930899

== See also ==
- Elektra and Wolverine: The Redeemer
