= Elektra and Wolverine: The Redeemer =

Graphic novels by Greg Rucka

Publication information
- Publisher: Marvel Comics
- Schedule: Monthly
- Publication date: 2002
- No. of issues: 3
- Main character(s): Wolverine; Elektra

Creative team
- Written by: Greg Rucka
- Artist: Yoshitaka Amano

Elektra and Wolverine: The Redeemer is a trilogy of graphic novels written by Greg Rucka, illustrated by Yoshitaka Amano and published by American company Marvel Comics. It was also released as a Hardcover version with all three episodes in one book. It is canon with Earth-616 continuity as implied in The Classic Marvel Figurine Collection #17 and the events took place soon after Elektra's first resurrection.

== Synopsis ==
The story opens shortly (apparently) after Wolverine gains his adamantium claws, and also involves established Marvel character Elektra. Elektra must kill the only witness to her last assassination, the victim's daughter, Avery, whom Wolverine has been hired to protect, by someone involved with his past, Dr. Connor. Elektra kidnaps Avery after critically wounding Wolverine, who then pursues Elektra, while Avery and the assassin bond. Wolverine is used by Keifer, another man with ties to his past, and is then ordered to kill Elektra. Avery is revealed to be a mutant, and after several revealing scenes and fights, Avery and Connor are given fake ID's and money to move on with new identities, leaving Logan and Elektra to go on future adventures, albeit separately.

== See also ==
- Wolverine/Nick Fury: The Scorpio Connection
- 2002 in comics
