= Howard Purcell =

American comics artist and writer

- Born: November 11, 1918 Bremerton, Washington, U.S.
- Died: April 24, 1981 (aged 62) Luzerne County, Pennsylvania, U.S.
- Areas: Writer, Penciller
- Notable works: Enchantress; Gay Ghost; Sargon the Sorcerer

Howard Purcell (November 10, 1918 – April 24, 1981) was an American comics artist and writer active from the 1940s Golden Age of Comic Books through the 1960s Silver Age.

A longtime penciler and cover artist for DC Comics, one of the field's two largest firms, he co-created the Golden Age characters Sargon the Sorcerer and the Gay Ghost (renamed in the 1970s the Grim Ghost) for All-American Publications, one of the companies, with National Comics and Detective Comics, that merged to form DC. Purcell also drew the famous cover of Green Lantern #1 (Fall 1941).

== Biography ==
Green Lantern #1 (Fall 1941). Cover art by Purcell

=== Early life and career ===
Howard Purcell, whose early influences included the adventure comic strip artists Hal Foster and Alex Raymond, as well as illustrators Harvey Dunn and Dean Cornwell, took art classes at the Art Students League of New York. He worked as an animator in New York City studios before entering the comics industry, where his earliest known credit is National's Adventure Comics #53 (Aug. 1940), for which he wrote and drew the six-page feature "Mark Lansing". The titular adventurer's exploits with subterranean races and other science fiction conceits ran through issue #62. By that time Purcell had drawn the cover of All-American Publications' All Star Comics #2 (Fall 1940) – reprinted as the cover of DC Comics' quirkily numbered, 2006 hardcover collection All Star Archives #0 – as well as the feature "Lando, Man of Magic" in World's Best Comics #1 (Spring 1941), and both the Green Lantern cover of, and the humorous adventure feature "Red, White and Blue" in, All-American Comics #25 (April 1941).

Purcell and writer John Wentworth created Sargon the Sorcerer in the following month's issue. A minor character in what would become the DC Universe, Sargon was John Sargent, whose exposure to the "Ruby of Life" during infancy granted him magical powers that he used in adulthood to fight crime, keeping his supernatural abilities camouflaged in his guise as a stage magician. Purcell and Wentworth continued with the character through All-American Comics #50 (June 1943).

With writer Gardner Fox, Purcell created the Gay Ghost in All-American's Sensation Comics #1 (Jan. 1942). The character, renamed the Grim Ghost in the 1970s, was similar to National Comics' the Spectre in that he was a ghost (of Keith Everet, the fictional 18th-century Earl of Strethmere) who inhabited the body of a modern man, Charles Collins, to fight injustice – although unlike the genuinely grim Spectre, he did so with cheery (i.e., gay) swashbuckling.

=== Later life and career ===
Purcell drew the Mr. District Attorney series, a comics adaptation of the radio crime drama, from 1948 to 1957. His 1960s work included drawing the DC series Sea Devils and co-creating the supernatural character the Enchantress with writer Bob Haney in Strange Adventures #187 (April 1966). The Enchantress appears in the 2016 live-action movie Suicide Squad, portrayed by Cara Delevingne. Purcell did a smattering for Marvel Comics, including two "Nick Fury, Agent of S.H.I.E.L.D." stories, over Jack Kirby layouts, in Strange Tales #143–144 (April–May 1966); a Black Knight solo feature in Marvel Super-Heroes #17 (Nov. 1968); and three 10-page, semi-anthological backup stories featuring the Watcher, in Silver Surfer #4–5 and #7 (Feb.–April 1969 and Aug. 1969). Purcell's last known work was a story each in the DC supernatural anthology Weird Mystery Tales #1–3 (Aug.–Dec. 1972), plus the cover of #2.

By at least 1968, Purcell was additionally a teacher at a high school in Wilkes-Barre, Pennsylvania and at the Luzerne County Community College in Nanticoke, Pennsylvania, and was chairman of that college's commercial art department. Purcell died April 24, 1981, in Luzerne County, Pennsylvania.

== Bibliography ==
=== DC Comics ===
- Adventure Comics #53–62 (1940–1941)
- All-American Comics #25–48, 50, 89–94, 97, 99, 101 (1941–1948)
- All-American Men of War #13, 17 (1954–1955)
- All Star Comics #42–46, 48–49, 51, 55 (1948–1950)
- The Brave and the Bold #51 (Aquaman and Hawkman) (1963)
- Comic Cavalcade #4–6, 15–29 (1943–1948)
- Doom Patrol #86 (1964)
- Falling in Love #96 (1968)
- Gang Busters #16, 29, 40, 47, 52, 54–57, 59, 64 (1950–1958)
- Girls' Love Stories #131, 133 (1967–1968)
- Girls' Romances #160 (1971)
- Green Lantern #26–27 (1947)
- Heart Throbs #112 (1968)
- House of Mystery #2–5, 7–8, 25–26, 29–30, 32, 35, 38–39, 43, 47, 68–69, 73, 77–78, 80–81, 87, 92–94, 97–98, 100, 103, 106, 112, 119–120, 122–123, 125–126, 128–129, 140 (1952–1964)
- House of Secrets #6, 11, 14, 17, 20–21, 27, 31–32, 35, 37–39, 41, 44–45, 49, 52–53, 55–57, 59 (1957–1963)
- Mr. District Attorney #6–59 (1948–1957)
- My Greatest Adventure #29, 33, 35–36, 38, 40, 44, 53–54, 58–59, 62–63, 66, 68, 70–71, 75, 78–79, 84 (1959–1963)
- Mystery in Space #1, 96–101, 103 (1951–1965)
- Our Army at War #27, 29 (1954)
- Sea Devils #16–33 (1964–1967)
- Sensation Comics #1–13, 15–33 (Gay Ghost) (1942–1944)
- Strange Adventures #10, 164, 166, 171, 184, 187, 191, 197, 200 (1951–1967)
- Tales of the Unexpected #1, 3, 22, 25–26, 28–29, 31, 33–34, 38, 40, 43, 45, 47, 51, 54–56, 59–63, 65, 67–68, 72, 81, 83–85, 92, 98 (1956–1966)
- The Unexpected #106 (1968)
- Weird Mystery Tales #1–3 (1972)
- World's Best Comics #1 (1941)
- World's Finest Comics #2–3 (1941)
- Young Romance #153 (1968)

=== EC Comics ===
- International Comics #1, 3 (1947)

=== Fawcett Comics ===
- Master Comics #22 (1942)

=== Marvel Comics ===
- Marvel Super-Heroes #17 (Black Knight) (1968)
- Silver Surfer #4–5, 7 (Watcher backup stories) (1969)
- Strange Tales #143–144 (Nick Fury, Agent of S.H.I.E.L.D. feature) (1966)

Preceded by Sam Citron	Mr. District Attorney penciller 1948–1957	Succeeded by Sheldon Moldoff
Preceded by Bruno Premiani	Sea Devils penciller 1964–1967	Succeeded by Chic Stone
