= Lee Marrs =

American cartoonist and animator

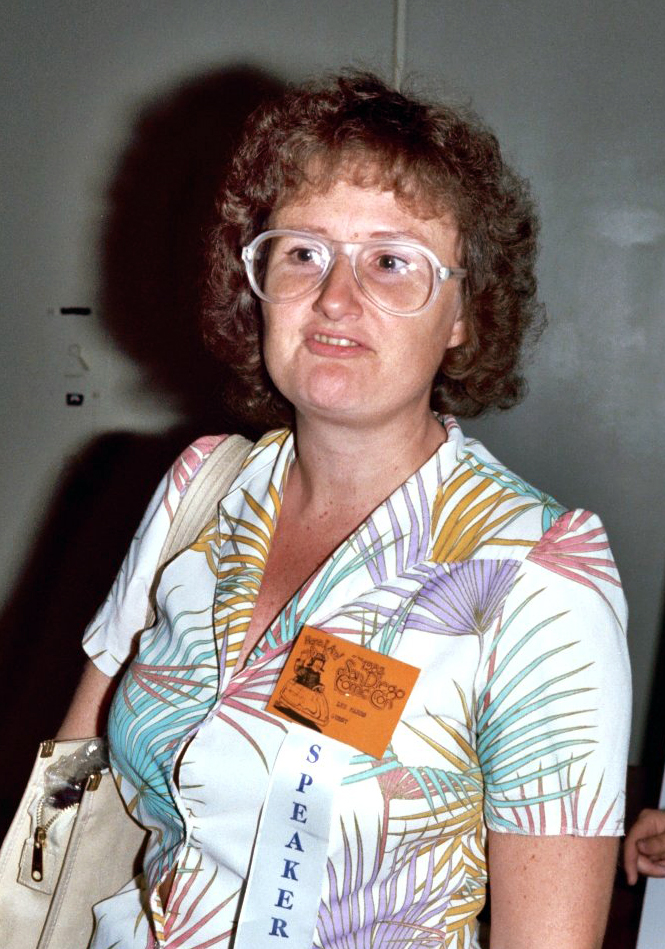
- Marrs at the 1982 San Diego Comic Con (today called Comic-Con International).
- Born: September 5, 1945 (age 81)
- Areas: Cartoonist, Writer
- Notable works: The Further Fattening Adventures of Pudge, Girl Blimp

Lee Marrs (born September 5, 1945) is an American cartoonist and animator, and one of the first female underground comix creators. She is best known for her comic book series The Further Fattening Adventures of Pudge, Girl Blimp, which lasted from 1973 to 1977.

== Work ==
=== Early career ===
Lee Marrs grew up in Montgomery, Alabama, and attended American University, graduating in 1967 with a degree in fine arts. During her time at American University, Marrs was introduced to comic strip artist Tex Blaisdell by his daughter, with whom she attended school. Marrs then began assisting Blaisdell, working on comics such as Little Orphan Annie, Prince Valiant, and Hi and Lois. At the same time, Marrs also worked for CBS News in Washington, DC, at WTOP, where she created artwork for the station and also drew live editorial cartoons on Saturday nights. Marrs was as a graphic artist on an Emmy-Award-winning animation about the 1968 riots.

In the late 1960s, Marrs moved to San Francisco, where she helped found Alternative Features Service, a news service that supplied college and underground newspapers with feature stories. Through the Alternative Features Service, Marrs met Trina Robbins, who would introduce her to the underground comix movement.

=== Underground comics ===
Marrs was a frequent contributor to underground comix and one of the "founding mommies" of the Wimmen's Comix collective. In the first issue of Wimmen's Comix (1972), Marrs' "All in a Day's Work" epitomizes how a woman's only leverage in a male-dominated society is to utilize her body to negotiate politics. Marrs' comic emphasizes the idea that equality for all women is equality not only of entrance but equality of execution. The last section of Marrs' comic "positions the naked female body as a panel divider, [and] viscerally connects the female body to the comics form."

Marrs provided stories for the underground titles Wet Satin, Manhunt, El Perfecto, and Gates of Heaven. Her parodies often substituted lesbians in place of heterosexual figures, as in feature strips in the long-running Gay Comix. Her story, "My Deadly Darling Dyke," published in Gay Comix #3 (Dec. 1982) is a popular and outspoken interdisciplinary crossover between queer identity and a cheeky parody of gothic melodrama.

As one of Mike Friedrich's Star Reach regulars, she expanded her writing and art style to include serious fantasy fiction in Stark's Quest (1977–1979), a study of ESP, politics, and social engineering. From this body of work, "Waters of Requital" (1977) is especially powerful. She created short futuristic graphic tales for Heavy Metal magazine, Epic Illustrated, and Imagine magazine.

Her work with Mike Friedrich evolved into a life partnership, and he has become her spouse.

==== The Further Fattening Adventures of Pudge, Girl Blimp ====
The Further Fattening Adventures of Pudge, Girl Blimp is a three-part comic book series about an overweight seventeen-year-old girl named Pudge who hitchhikes to San Francisco at the height of the counterculture movement with the goal of losing her virginity. The series addresses themes of feminism, sexual orientation, racial diversity, and body positivity. The first issue of Pudge, Girl Blimp was published by Last Gasp Eco Funnies in 1973, while the final two issues were published by Star Reach in 1975 and 1977. In 2016, Marrs published a complete edition of Pudge, Girl Blimp which was nominated for an Eisner Award in 2017.

=== Mainstream comics ===
Marrs was one of few underground cartoonists to also work for mainstream comics publishers, and one of the first women to work for DC Comics and Marvel Comics simultaneously. She was introduced to DC Comics editor Joe Orlando by Tex Blaisdell. After working on DC’s Plop!, Weird Mystery Tales, and House of Secrets, she created "Crazy Lady" (1975), a series about growing up female, for Marvel Comics’ Crazy magazine. Much of her mainstream comics work was as a writer, including Wonder Woman Annual 1989, Viking Glory: the Viking Prince (DC, 1991), and Zatanna: Come Together (DC, 1993).

She wrote 2 Indiana Jones miniseries for Dark Horse Comics: Indiana Jones and the Arms of Gold (1994) and Indiana Jones and the Iron Phoenix (1995), both drawn by Leo Durañona.

In 1986 Blackthorne Publishing published Pre-Teen Dirty-Gene Kung Fu Kangaroos, a three-issue series created by Marrs which parodied the original Teenage Mutant Ninja Turtles comic book series, as well as the American Flagg! comics.

=== Animation ===
Lee Marrs runs Lee Marrs Artwork, a digital design and animation company. She worked in 2D digital animation in the early 1980s. Her clients have included Disney/ABC, Apple Computer, IBM, Time Warner Inc., Children's Television Workshop, Nickelodeon, Electronic Arts, and MTV. She began teaching at Berkeley City College in 2000, serving as Multimedia Chair there until her retirement in 2014.

== Impact and influence ==
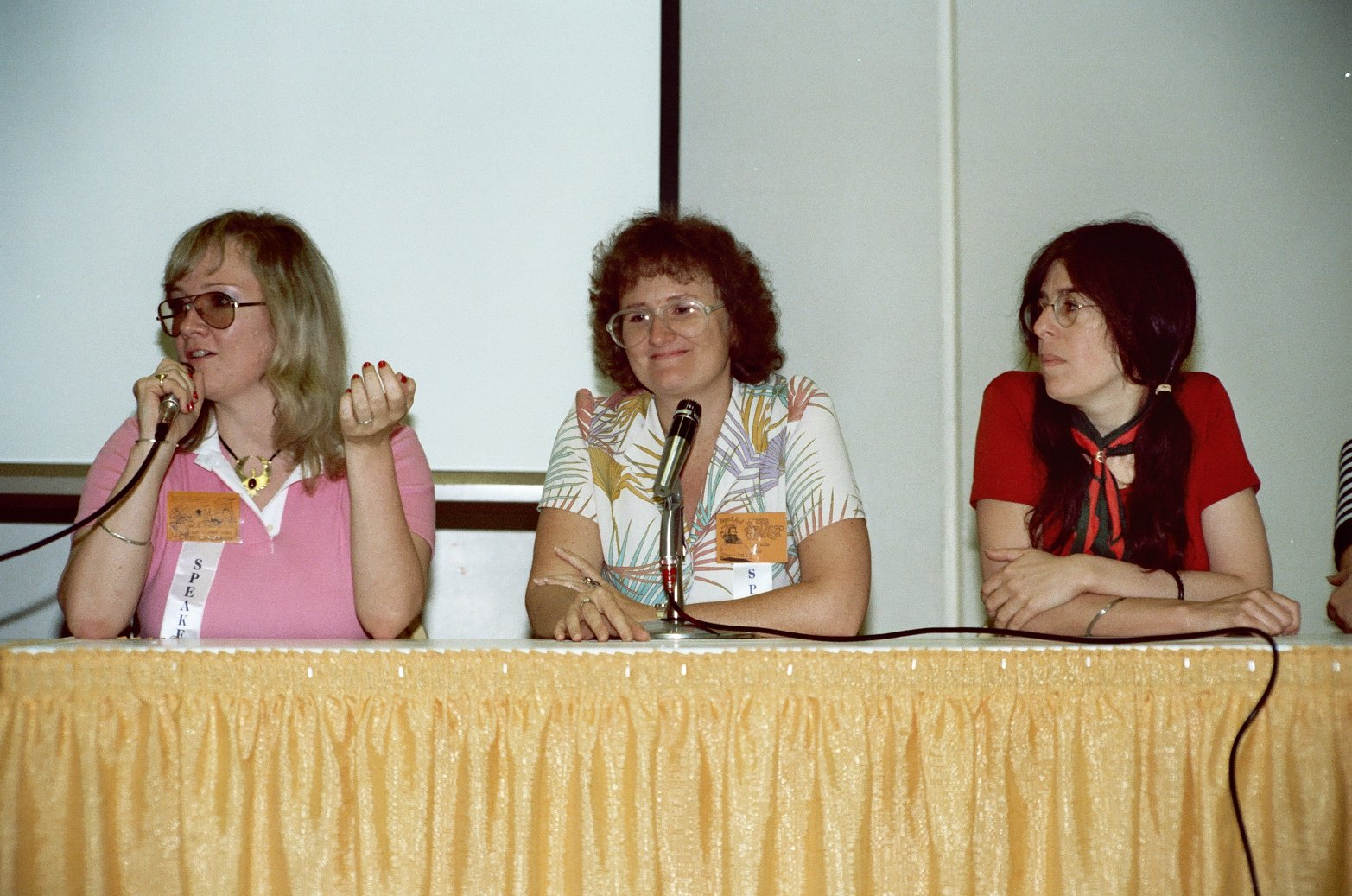
Jo Duffy, Lee Marrs and Catherine Yronwode on the Women In Comics panel at the 1982 San Diego Comic Con

Lee Marrs' comics influenced feminism, queer theory, and visual culture in the 1980s. Her comics explore how women participated in the feminist wave while they were understanding and exploring their queer sexuality. In the era when the Equal Rights Amendment had come to the forefront, feminists believed that women as human beings were denied the chance to develop their fullest human potential. Marrs produced the four-page “Equal Rites” for Wimmen’s Comix #8, where female protagonists live in a futuristic world where standards are mono-gendered, and the implementation of the ERA amendment has blossomed; the glass ceiling for feminist stereotypes has been shattered.

In a media interview, Marrs discussed prejudice from leaders of the feminist movement, and how feminists critique female comic authors who think outside the box: "But we got totally rejected by the women's movement, for the most part. Not just that Ms. magazine wouldn't run us, but bookstores across the country wouldn't carry us, because we did not have a heavy, traditional, feminist political line."

Marrs equates these concrete examples with rejection, for they foreclose the ability of the collective to reach a broader feminist audience despite their varied attempts to participate. Her quotation also foregrounds their comics as something done differently from the feminist norm in their content, even though Marrs also equates their comics with the "work[ing] through" that happened in consciousness-raising group."

== Awards ==
Marrs was awarded the Comic-Con International Inkpot Award in 1982.

Marrs won an Emmy for her work as an animation director.

In 2026, Marrs was selected for inclusion in the Eisner Hall of Fame.

== See also ==
- Female comics creators
- List of female comics creators
