= Scorpion (Atlas/Seaboard Comics) =

The Scorpion #1 (Feb. 1975), cover art by Howard Chaykin.

The Scorpion is the name of two fictional characters who starred successively in an eponymous comic book series published by Atlas/Seaboard Comics in the 1970s.

== Publication history ==
The Scorpion ran three issues, cover-dated February to July 1975. The premiere was written and drawn by character creator Howard Chaykin. On the second issue, Chaykin's pencil art was inked by the team of Bernie Wrightson, Michael Kaluta, Walt Simonson and Ed Davis.

Citing lack of control over his creation, Chaykin quit and the third issue was produced by writer Gabriel Levy and penciler Jim Craig, with uncredited inker Jim Mooney.

== Fictional character biographies ==
The protagonist for the first two issues was an immortal adventurer in the 1930s whose then-current identity is Moro Frost.

In the third and final issue, the Scorpion is a present-day superhero, David Harper. This revamp played off an introductory sequence in the first issue that indicated the Scorpion changed his identity every few years, allowing this to be the same man.

== Dominic Fortune ==
Following the cancellation of the series, Chaykin used the Scorpion as the basis for his Marvel Comics character Dominic Fortune.
