= Avengers 1959 =

2011 comics book miniseries

Publication information
- Publisher: Marvel Comics
- No. of issues: 5
- Main character: The Avengers

Creative team
- Written by: Howard Chaykin
- Penciller: Howard Chaykin
- Inker: Howard Chaykin
- Letterer: Jared K. Fletcher
- Colorist: Jesus Aburtov
- Editor(s): Tom Brevoort; John Denning; Cory Levine; Nelson Ribeiro; Lauren Sankovitch; Alex Starbuck

Avengers 1959 is a 2011 five issue comic book miniseries written and drawn by Howard Chaykin. The story takes place in 1959 and concerns Nick Fury leading an early incarnation of the Avengers who hunt down Nazi war criminals who escaped justice after World War II. The team consists of Nick Fury, Dum Dum Dugan, Sabretooth, Dominic Fortune, Namora, Kraven the Hunter, Ulysses Bloodstone, Silver Sable (father of the more familiar, female character), and the Blonde Phantom.

== Publication history ==
The series was published in France in 2012.

== Plot ==
In Latveria, the Blonde Phantom works undercover to discover a supposed secret Nazi plot. She is pretending to date former Nazi general Dieter Skul, who was presumed dead during World War II. Skul gets suspicious when he finds the Phantom snooping in his bedroom, but she flirts her way out of trouble. Meanwhile, Geoffrey Sydenham is in Wakanda to develop a covert diplomatic relationship between Wakanda and the United States.

After surviving an attempt on his life, Nick Fury arrives home to find Powell McTeague there wishing to speak with him. McTeague reveals that he was sent by General Hill to give Fury unofficial orders to travel to Hassenstadt in Latveria to continue his secret war against surviving Nazi war criminals. In Hassenstadt, he meets his friend Eric Koenig, now an American diplomat to Latveria, and introduces him to the Blonde Phantom. She reveals that she was dating Skul as a means of finding out more information about a possible large-scale Nazi plot before she was caught eavesdropping. The Wakandan ambassador to Latveria also reveals that their prince T'Chaka was kidnapped and he believes it to be the work of the same people that Fury is chasing. In Washington D.C., General Hill and his men investigate a possible Nazi safe-house. The occupants appeared to have been tipped off, however, as the house is booby-trapped, killing Hill's men.

Fury and the Phantom go to check out a hideout that was mentioned in one of Skul's files, finding the Hollow Men, mindless Nazi zombies, inside. Fury manages to blow up the building before he and the Phantom disappear into the shadows. The rest of the Avengers find themselves teleported aboard a ship in the South China Sea by McTeague. The ship is led by the Nazi war criminals Baron Blood and Brain Drain who the Avengers immediately attack. After defeating them, the Nazis are transported away by Geoffrey Sydenham who wants to recruit them into his own army. In Washington D.C., Senator Sanford and Sydenham attempt to sway General Hill to their way of thinking, but Hill storms out of the room, calling them insane after Sydenham insinuates that America and the Nazis should have been allies during World War II.

Nick Fury and the Blonde Phantom steal a Latverian fighter plane in order to leave the country without being seen on a commercial flight. Traveling to Wakanda, the pair are given information that should lead them to Skul. The two come under attack by the Ubermadchen, but are saved by the rest of the Avengers.

The Avengers interrogate the Ubermadchen before allowing Sabretooth to kill them. The team then travels to the island of Madripoor where they discover a mansion headquarters belonging to their enemies. The Avengers raid the mansion, capturing strategist Innsbruck. From him, the team learns of Skul's attack on Wakanda. Utilizing McTeague's teleportation abilities, the group gets to Wakanda just in time to battle Skul's men.

The Avengers each go their separate ways shortly after defeating the terrorist organization. Shortly after his, Fury and McTeague discover that Sydenham has been released in exchange for his cooperation in finding T'Chaka. Sydenham is later seen in Greenwich Village continuing his use of the dark arts.

== Reception ==
The series holds an average rating of 7.5 by twelve professional critics on the review aggregation website Comic Book Roundup.

Chad Nevett of CBR.com stated that the first issue delivered on everything that a fan of Chaykin could want but that the coloring works against his art.
