= Weird Worlds (comics) =

Science fiction anthology comic series

- Weird Worlds #1 (September 1972), art by Joe Kubert.

Publication information
- Publisher: DC Comics
- Format: Ongoing series
- Genre: Science fiction
- Publication date: Vol. 1: September 1972 – October–November 1974; Vol. 2: March 2011 – August 2011
- No. of issues: Vol. 1: 10; Vol. 2: 6

Creative team
- Written by: List: Vol. 1: Dennis O'Neil, Len Wein, Marv Wolfman Vol. 2: Aaron Lopresti, Kevin Maguire, Kevin VanHook
- Artist: List: Vol. 1: Murphy Anderson, Howard Chaykin, Dan Green, Michael Kaluta, Alan Weiss Vol. 2: Aaron Lopresti, Kevin Maguire, Jerry Ordway
- Editor: List: Vol. 1: Dennis O'Neil (#1–10) Vol. 2: Joey Cavalieri (#1–6)

Weird Worlds is an American comic book science fiction anthology series published by DC Comics that originally ran from 1972 to 1974 for a total of 10 issues. The title's name was partially inspired by the sales success of Weird War Tales and Weird Western Tales. A second series was published in 2011.

== Original series ==
Weird Worlds published features based on writer Edgar Rice Burroughs' creations which DC had obtained the licensing rights. This included the "John Carter of Mars" feature, by scripter Marv Wolfman and artist Murphy Anderson, which moved from Tarzan #209, and the "Pellucidar" feature from Korak, Son of Tarzan #46 drawn by Alan Weiss, Michael Kaluta, and Dan Green.

These features ran until issue #7 (October 1973) until it became economically infeasible for DC to continue publishing so many adaptations of Burroughs' work. "John Carter" would re-appear in Tarzan Family #62–64 and "Pellucidar" in Tarzan Family #66.

A new feature began in issue #8, Dennis O'Neil and Howard Chaykin's Ironwolf, which ran through issue #10. The release of the last issue of Weird Worlds was delayed for several months due to a nationwide paper shortage, and was the reason given in issue 10 for its cancellation. The Weird Worlds stories were reprinted in an Ironwolf one-shot in March 1987.

== Second series ==
The title was relaunched in March 2011 and ran for six issues. It featured Lobo and two new characters: Aaron Lopresti's Garbage Man and Kevin Maguire's Tanga.

In September 2011, The New 52 rebooted DC's continuity. In this new timeline, the characters appeared in the title My Greatest Adventure.
