= Gay Ghost =

Comic book character

- The Gay Ghost, excerpt from Sensation Comics #1 (January 1942).

Publication information
- Publisher: DC Comics (originally All-American Publications)
- First appearance: Sensation Comics #1 (January 1942)
- Created by: Gardner Fox; Howard Purcell

In-story information
- Alter ego: Keith Everet
- Team affiliations: All-Star Squadron
- Notable aliases: Grim Ghost
- Abilities: Possess a living host Incorporeality at will Keen swordsman and hand to hand combatant

The Gay Ghost (later renamed the Grim Ghost, not to be confused with Grim Ghost) is a superhero in the DC Comics universe whose first appearance was in Sensation Comics #1 (January 1942), published by one of DC's predecessor companies, All-American Publications. He was created by writer Gardner Fox and artist Howard Purcell.

== Publication history ==
The Gay Ghost appeared in Sensation Comics #1–13, 15–33, and 38, his last appearance until Secret Origins (vol. 2) #42 (July 1989). He later appeared in Animal Man #25 (July 1990).

In 18th-century Ireland, Keith Everet, the Earl of Strethmere, is killed by footpads as he is on his way to propose to his beloved Deborah Wallace. The Earl's three killers were swiftly caught, and hanged on the spot. But Deborah died of a broken heart shortly afterward. After his death, he encounters his ancestors, who return him to life in return for a vow to fight for justice. There is one catch: he has to wait for Deborah Wallace to return to Ireland (after emigrating to America) before he can return.

Everet's spirit haunts his castle until 1941, when the last remaining descendant of Deborah Wallace, who shares her name, returns to Ireland together with Charles Collins, her would-be fiance. They come to the castle at the same time as some Nazi saboteurs and Collins is killed. Seeing his beloved Deborah in danger, Everet takes over Collins' body, deals with the saboteurs, and returns to America with Deborah. In America, Everet would leave the body of "Charles" in order to fight crime.

According to Jess Nevins' Encyclopedia of Golden Age Superheroes, the Gay Ghost's enemies include "the Nazi mad scientist Dr. Vozak, the one-armed, torch-handed Flaming Hand, the heat-ray-wielding Japanese spy Togio, and the immortal Mexican El Espada".

The Gay Ghost's afterlife has been somewhat troubled. The meaning of the word "gay" changed quite a bit after his Golden Age appearances. In reprints, DC has changed the name to "Grim Ghost", a moniker that the character never used in the 1940s.

=== Limbo ===
Grant Morrison's run on Animal Man conjectures that all characters which were once published by DC Comics but are no longer active are sent to a dimension called "Limbo", where they remain until they are revived by returning to active publication. Characters never remember being in Limbo. In Animal Man #25, Animal Man becomes the first character to visit Limbo while still "current" and encounters a large number of old Golden Age and Silver Age DC comic book characters. The Gay Ghost is among them, but he says that he does not want to be "brought back", since the colloquial meaning of the word gay has changed since the character was created in the 1940s, and he is not himself a homosexual.

During Final Crisis: Superman Beyond 3D #1-2 (October 2008) the Gay Ghost and other inhabitants of Limbo are rescued by Superman, who they assist in fighting a cosmic threat. Other inhabitants of Limbo include (but are not limited to) Merryman, Ace the Bat-Hound and Hardhat.

== Powers and abilities ==
The Gay Ghost is able to leave Collins' body at will and can also materialise/dematerialise at will. Apart from that, he is a keen swordsman and hand-to-hand fighter.

== Sources ==
- Secret Origins Volume 2, #42, story and textpage
