= Ironwolf =

Comics character

Ironwolf is a fictional character who appeared in the last three issues of Weird Worlds, a comics anthology series published by American company DC Comics from 1973 to 1974.

Ironwolf was created by Howard Chaykin, with Dennis O'Neil and Walt Simonson serving as writer and letterer for his stories. Ironwolf has no powers, but is an extraordinary hand-to-hand combat fighter. He is a master swordsman and highly skilled with the guns of his era. He sometimes uses antique 20th-century weapons like a .357 Magnum.

== Creation ==
Weird Worlds editorial was in need of a new character since they lost the license to the Edgar Rice Burroughs library. Editor Denny O'Neil recalled the conversation with writer/artist Howard Chaykin in the editorial column in issue #7 of Weird Worlds, in which Chaykin stated:

"I want to do a strip about piracy, war and rebellion. I intend to combine elements of those magnificent swashbuckling films Seahawk, Captain Blood, Robin Hood in a cosmic setting. My hero is a man rebelling against a queen determined to sell the human race to a herd of nasty aliens from a distant star. His quest for a way to de- feat the villains takes him to hundreds of bizarre planets–weird worlds. He's brave, educated, determined and desperate. His ship's crew are loyal to him and he's loyal to them and everyone else interested in the welfare of his solar system. O'Neil, I can't describe all the stuff I'm putting in. Battles, beautiful women, eerie creatures–everything! Tell the fans that anyone with a taste for high adventure has got to like Ironwolf."

In the 1986 reprint of the Weird Worlds stories, Chaykin credited these stories as demonstrating the origins of his adult-oriented stories later in his career. "Unlike the other bits and pieces that all tie together to pass for a history, this book was seminal. Nearly every idea, attitude, theme, or obsession that makes up my recent work was tossed out for your enjoyment in Ironwolf 12 years ago."

== Fictional character history ==
Lord Ironwolf is an officer from the interstellar Galaktika Empire in the 61st century. On his homeworld of Illium, he owns millions of trees with "anti-gravity wood" that is used to make starships. He renounces his position in opposition to Empress Erika Klein-Hernandez's cruelty and rebels against her, fearing that her alien allies will build a fleet to attack the Empire.

== Later versions ==
The Weird Worlds stories were reprinted in an Ironwolf one-shot in March 1986. Chaykin returned to the Ironwolf character in 1992, co-writing Ironwolf: Fires of the Revolution with frequent collaborator John Francis Moore. This graphic novel was penciled by Mike Mignola and inked by P. Craig Russell. Some of the events of the Weird World stories are recapitulated here but it also brings the story to something of a close.
