= Wolverine/Nick Fury: The Scorpio Connection =

1989 graphic novel

- Cover drawn by Howard Chaykin
- Date: 1989
- Main characters: Wolverine, Nick Fury and Mikel Fury
- Series: Marvel Graphic Novel
- Page count: 62 pages
- Publisher: Marvel Comics

Creative team
- Writers: Archie Goodwin
- Artists: Howard Chaykin
- Pencillers: Howard Chaykin
- Inkers: Howard Chaykin
- Letterers: Ken Bruzenak
- Colourists: Richard Ory; Barb Rausch
- Editors: Mark Gruenwald; Evan Skolnick; Sara Tuchinsky; Gregory Wright; Tom DeFalco

Original publication
- Date of publication: August 1989
- Language: English
- ISBN: 0-87135-577-9

Chronology
- Followed by: Wolverine: Bloody Choices

Wolverine/Nick Fury: The Scorpio Connection is a 1989 American graphic novel published by Marvel Comics, written by Archie Goodwin and drawn by Howard Chaykin. The story concerns a new Scorpio, who is attempting to kill Nick Fury. Wolverine becomes involved when he investigates the murder of a friend who once saved his life at the hands of the new Scorpio. It is the first part of the Wolverine/Nick Fury trilogy.

It was the 50th installment in the Marvels Graphic Novel Series.

== Publication history ==
The story was reprinted in Wolverine and Nick Fury: Scorpio in 2012, which contains the three stories of the trilogy, Wolverine: Bloody Choices and Wolverine/Nick Fury: Scorpio Rising being the other two.

== Plot ==
The story begins in Machu Picchu where five S.H.I.E.L.D. agents are operating under cover to look for potential terrorists then suddenly they are attacked and killed by an unseen enemy. The unidentified killer then drops a small tablet with the Scorpio symbol on one of the dead agents head.

The story then cuts to S.H.I.E.L.D. headquarters in New York where Nick Fury and Dum Dum Dugan are exercising and having a discussion about Nick and Valentina Allegra de Fontaine's romantic relationship, with Nick commenting that that kind of life seems to late for him to have by now. After they leave the building Dugan's wife arrives with their two sons Kevin and Scott who run up to him and beg him to take them to a movie or to the zoo. Afterwards Nick continues to contemplate about his age and his family, especially his younger brother Jacob who committed suicide which he feels responsible for and questions what kind of father he would have made since he feels that he could not even protect his brother.

Later the story cuts to the X-Men fighting the villain Arcade. After the fight Arcade tells Wolverine that he knows that his friend David Nanjiwarra has been killed. It turns out that Nanjiwarra was one of the agents killed by Scorpio in Machu Picchu. Back at SHIELD headquarters Nick, Dugan and another agent are discussing the small disc left on the crime scene and Nick thinks that Scorpio should be dead since he saw his brother kill himself. Afterwards Nick goes to a bar where he meets Wolverine who tells him that he knew Nanjiwarra and is intending to find his killer.

Meanwhile, the story jumps to the island Andros where the new Scorpio's face is revealed for the first time, being a young man with a resemblance to Nick. His mother appears and they go aboard a yacht and talk about his recent mission with the agents and he tells her that it went just as well as his previous missions in Taiwan and the Balkans. Afterwards he puts on the Scorpio suit and it is revealed that his name is Mikel and that their plan is to kill Nick Fury as revenge for him being responsible for the death of Mikel's father; Jake Fury.

Back with Wolverine he has traveled to Machu Picchu to investigate the crime scene. When there he has a flashback as to how he and Nanjiwarra meet. In the Australian Tanami desert where he was chasing a terrorist assassin, Wolverine is shot at by a helicopter and runs away but is shot and is too tired to get himself to civilisation. Nanjiwarra finds him, gives him water and helps him walk through the desert. While doing this they converse with each other to keep sane in the heat. When they finally reach a bar they attempt to buy two beers but the bartender replies that he doesn't want to serve Nanjiwarra since he is an Aborigine. Wolverine angrily forces him to sell them the beers anyway. Nanjiwarra states that he's thinking about joining S.H.I.E.L.D. since he has heard that it's an intelligence organisation where racism is not tolerated.

After a confrontation between Wolverine, Nick and Mikel where Wolverine and Nick barely escape Nick postulates that Mikel and his mother may have a man on the inside who has fed them secret information. The backstory of Mikel and his mother is explained by Nick to Wolverine—he explains that many years earlier his brother had been in a relationship with a terrorist named Amber D'Alexis. To get to her Nick had seduced her to get information so he could expose her to police. Instead of understanding that Amber was a criminal and had betrayed him Jake blamed Nick and decided to go with her and become the first Scorpio to get revenge on Nick.

During the final confrontation Nick captures D'Alexis and keeps her hostage to try to force Mikel into stop trying to kill them but D'Alexis exclaims that Mikel is not Jake's son but Nick's, his shock allows her to escape his grip and Mikel once again attempts to shoot him with the cosmic key, but is stopped by Wolverine who takes the weapon away. Nick manages to shoot Mikel in his shoulder but D'Alexis picks up the cosmic key and aims it at Nick while she explains that she has raised Mikel to hate Nick and that the brain washing is never going to go away. Wolverine manages to attack her before she can fire at Nick but she immobilises him and turns back to Nick and Mikel. Nick tells her that Mikel is bleeding out and if they do not get him medical attention he will die. She responds that she doesn't care and that all she wants is for Nick to die. At this point Wolverine stabs her in the back and kills her.

Afterward, Wolverine attempts to kill Mikel as well as to avenge Nanjiwarra but Nick stops him by revealing that Nanjiwarra was the person who leaked the information to D'Alexis and her allies because he had been the victim of racism in S.H.I.E.L.D. Even though they had put a stop to it the damage was already done and Nanjiwarra betrayed them. In the end Nick decides to attempt to help his son recover from his lifetime of brainwashing and Wolverine wishes him luck.

== Collected editions ==
The Scorpio Connection has been reprinted in the following trade paperbacks:

Title	Material collected	Publication date	ISBN
Wolverine & Nick Fury: Scorpio	Wolverine/Nick Fury: The Scorpio Connection; Wolverine: Bloody Choices; Wolverine/Nick Fury: Scorpio Rising	April 4, 2012	978-0785153481
Wolverine Epic Collection Vol. 2 - Back to Basics	Wolverine (vol. 2) #17–30; Wolverine/Nick Fury: The Scorpio Connection; Wolverine: The Jungle Adventure	March 2019	978-1302916091

== Reception ==
Andrew Young of Geek Hard placed the story as one of the best Nick Fury stories ever. Young stated that the story took the "team up" dynamic and made it enjoyable again. He also stated that the story transcends the trappings of its genre and gives the reader a smart mystery that slowly unravels around the characters. He also stated that it was arguably one of Goodwin's best tales and probably the finest work from Chaykin. He finished by saying that the plot holds up even with its soap opera-like conclusion and that it was lightning in a bottle as attempts to recreate this dynamic with these characters have never resulted in great success in his opinion.

Win Wiacek of Now Read This described the book as less than the sum of its parts but stated that it was still immensely readable. A reviewer from Alien Bee Entertainment stated that Goodwin weaved a surprisingly mature tale of two men whose pasts have come back to haunt them and that the story moved at a brisk pace, and that when it came to the action, Goodwin did not hold the characters back. He said that Chaykin conveyed the action and the scenes of conversation with equal appeal.

Marc Buxton of Den of Geek stated that the book is an almost forgotten gem, and that people should be rediscovering it. The book was ranked 25 on Diamonds sales from trades in February 1995.

== See also ==
- Nick's World
- 1989 in comics
