= Star Reach =

Star Reach may refer to:

- Star Reach (comics), a comics anthology
- Star Reach (video game), a 1994 video game
