= Adventure into Fear =

American horror comic book series

- Adventure into Fear #11 (December 1972), cover art by Neal Adams

Publication information
- Publisher: Marvel Comics
- Publication date: November 1970 through December 1975
- No. of issues: 31

Adventure into Fear is an American horror comic book series published by Marvel Comics from cover dates November 1970 through December 1975, for 31 issues. This is its trademarked cover title for all but its first nine issues, though the series is copyrighted in its postal indicia as simply Fear.

The first nine issues, cover-titled Fear, reprinted science fiction/fantasy and monster stories from the late 1950s and early 1960s "pre-superhero Marvel" comics, primarily Journey into Mystery, Strange Tales, Tales to Astonish, and Tales of Suspense. Most were written by Marvel editor-in-chief Stan Lee and/or Larry Lieber, and generally penciled by Jack Kirby, Steve Ditko, or Don Heck, though occasionally by Paul Reinman or Joe Sinnott. Most covers were reprints, though Marie Severin drew the new top half of issue #4, John Severin the cover of issue #8, and the team of Gil Kane (penciler) and Frank Giacoia (inker) the covers of issues #5, 6 and 9.

== Man-Thing ==
With issue #10 (Oct. 1972), the series was retitled Adventure into Fear (though it remained titled Fear in the indicia) and began featuring new material. Issues #10-19 featured the swamp creature the Man-Thing, continuing from his introduction in the black-and-white comics-magazine Savage Tales #1 (May 1971). Following a story written by Man-Thing co-creator Gerry Conway, scripting was taken over by Steve Gerber, for whom the feature and eventual comic book series The Man-Thing would prove a signature work. Through issue #14, a back-up reprint story would be featured, similar to those that appeared in the first nine issues.

== Howard the Duck ==
The story in issue #19 (Dec. 1973) introduced Howard the Duck, a cynical, cigar-smoking, anthropomorphic waterfowl — a parody of cartoon animals — intended as a throwaway character. That plan changed when the duck quickly proved popular, becoming one of Marvel's biggest 1970s characters and a pop-culture phenomenon that would later also get a solo series, as well as a notoriously poorly received feature film produced by George Lucas. Issue #20 was originally supposed to finish this story, but it was published as The Man-Thing #1 (Jan. 1974) instead.

== Morbius ==
Adventure into Fear #20 (February 1974), cover art by Gil Kane (penciler) and Frank Giacoia (inker)

Morbius the Living Vampire, introduced in The Amazing Spider-Man #101 (Oct. 1971), became the starring feature with Adventure into Fear #20 (Feb. 1974) and continued through the rest of the run, ending at #31. After a single issue by writer Mike Friedrich and penciler Paul Gulacy, Steve Gerber wrote several issues, in which Morbius went on a picaresque interdimensional journey and fought the Caretakers of Arcturus IV and was advised by the eyeball-headed character I. Doug Moench and Bill Mantlo followed, successively, as the feature's writers. Its round robin of artists included Gil Kane, P. Craig Russell, Frank Robbins, George Evans and Don Heck. Back-up reprints shortly resumed in issue #20. Morbius would then receive his own short-lived comic book series in the 1990s.

== Collected editions ==
- Adventure into Fear Omnibus (hardcover, July 2020, ISBN 978-1302925123) collects Adventure into Fear #1-31.

=== Man-Thing ===
- Essential Man-Thing Vol. 1 (reprints Adventure into Fear #10-19)
- Man-Thing Omnibus (reprints Adventure into Fear #10-19)

=== Howard the Duck ===
- Howard the Duck Omnibus (reprints Adventure into Fear #19)
- Howard the Duck: The Complete Collection Vol. 1 (reprints Adventure into Fear #19)

=== Morbius ===
- Morbius Epic Collection Vol. 1: The Living Vampire (reprints Adventure into Fear #20-26)
- Morbius Epic Collection Vol. 2: The End of a Living Vampire (reprints Adventure into Fear #27-31)
- Morbius the Living Vampire Omnibus (reprints Adventure into Fear #20-31)
