= Wolverine/Nick Fury trilogy =

Comics

- Cover of the collected graphic novel

Publication information
- Publisher: Marvel Comics
- Publication date: 1989, 1991, 1994
- Main character(s): Wolverine, Nick Fury and Mikel Fury

Creative team
- Writer(s): Archie Goodwin; Tom DeFalco; Howard Chaykin
- Artist(s): Howard Chaykin; John Buscema; Shawn McManus
- Penciller(s): Howard Chaykin; John Buscema
- Inker(s): Howard Chaykin; John Buscema
- Letterer(s): Ken Bruzenak; Janice Chiang; Chris Eliopoulos
- Editor(s): Mark Gruenwald; Evan Skolnick; Sara Tuchinsky; Gregory Wright; Tom DeFalco; Chris DeFelippo; Dawn Geiger; Pat Garrahy; Ralph Macchio

The Wolverine/Nick Fury trilogy is a trilogy of graphic novels published by American company Marvel Comics, all featuring the characters Wolverine and Nick Fury.

== Publication history ==
The graphic novel Wolverine/Nick Fury: The Scorpio Connection was originally published in 1989, Wolverine: Bloody Choices was published in 1991 and Wolverine/Nick Fury: Scorpio Rising was published in 1994. They were all reprinted in Wolverine & Nick Fury: Scorpio in 2012.

== Plot ==
=== Scorpio Connection ===
An old friend of Wolverine is murdered by Nick Fury's old enemy Scorpio who was presumed dead. Fury wants to find out if it is the same man behind the mask this time, his brother Jake. As the mystery resolves it is revealed that the new Scorpio is actually Nick Fury's son Mikel, who has been brainwashed and manipulated by his mother to hate Fury and to eventually kill him. In the end she is killed and Nick takes his son into custody to try to help him recover from his mother's mistreatment.

=== Bloody Choices ===
Wolverine intervenes when he finds out from an old friend that a boy has been sexually abused by a crimelord named Mr. Bullfinch. Wolverine tries to track down Bullfinch but finds out that the man is under Nick Fury's protection so that he can stand as a witness in a trial to bring down a large crime ring. After finding the S.H.I.E.L.D. safe house where Bullfinch is being held, Wolverine and Fury comes to blows, with Fury fighting his best to keep his promise to protect Bullfinch but Wolverine ultimately prevailing, after which he chases down Bullfinch and kills him.

=== Scorpio Rising ===
Mikel Fury is having a hard time adapting and training to become a S.H.I.E.L.D. agent and after learning that his home country of Carpasia is waging a civil war, he leaves to fight for peace. He takes the Cosmic Key and heads for Carpasia where HYDRA is using LMDs to wage war, as well as to bait Mikel and take possession of the Key from him. Fury and Wolverine team up again to go set Scorpio straight and free the country of HYDRA.

== Collected editions ==
The trilogy was oringally collected as in the following trade paperback.

| Title | Material collected | Publication date | ISBN |
|---|---|---|---|
| Wolverine & Nick Fury: Scorpio | Wolverine/Nick Fury: The Scorpio Connection; Wolverine: Bloody Choices; Wolverine/Nick Fury: Scorpio Rising | April 4, 2012 | 978-0785153481 |

Some of the trilogy were also later reprinted in the Marvel Epic Collection of Wolverine.

| Title | Vol. | Vol. title | Material collected | Publication date | ISBN |
|---|---|---|---|---|---|
| Wolverine Epic Collection | 2 | Back to Basics | Wolverine (vol. 2) #17–30; Wolverine / Nick Fury: Scorpio Connection; Wolverine: The Jungle Adventure | March 2019 | 978-1302916091 |
| Wolverine Epic Collection | 3 | Blood and Claws | Wolverine (vol. 2) #31–44 (1988), Wolverine: Bloodlust (1990) 1, Wolverine: Bloody Choices (1991) 1 | July 2021 | 978-1302930899 |

== Sales ==
Wolverine & Nick Fury: Scorpio sold an estimated 1,441 upon its release, ranked the 56th ranked trade paperback in North America in March 2012.

== See also ==
- 2012 in comics
