= Nick Fury, Agent of S.H.I.E.L.D. (feature) =

Feature in an anthology comic

- Strange Tales #135 (August 1965); Cover art by Jack Kirby and Frank Giacoia

Publication information
- Publisher: Marvel Comics
- Format: Ongoing series
- Publication date: 1965–1968
- No. of issues: 34
- Main character: Nick Fury

Creative team
- Created by: Stan Lee; Jack Kirby; Jim Steranko
- Written by: Stan Lee; Dennis O'Neil; Roy Thomas; Jim Steranko
- Pencillers: Jack Kirby; John Severin; Don Heck; Howard Purcell; John Buscema; Jim Steranko
- Inkers: Dick Ayers; Joe Sinnott; Frank Giacoia; Mike Espostito; Ogden Whitney
- Letterers: Artie Simek; Sam Rosen
- Editor: Stan Lee

"Nick Fury, Agent of S.H.I.E.L.D." is a feature that was in the comics anthology Strange Tales which began in 1965 and lasted until 1968. It introduced the fictional spy agency S.H.I.E.L.D. into the Marvel Comics world and reintroduced the character of Nick Fury as an older character from his concurrently-running series Sgt. Fury and his Howling Commandos, which was a series set during World War II. The feature replaced the previously running Human Torch feature in the book and ran alongside the Doctor Strange feature. After the feature ended, a comic book series was published which has had several volumes as well as a comic strip. The feature was originally created by the duo of Stan Lee and Jack Kirby who also created the original Sgt. Fury series but it was later taken over by artist and writer Jim Steranko. The feature was often censored by the Comics Code Authority due to Jim Steranko's provocative art; this art helped change the landscape of comics which Steranko continued with in the 1968 ongoing series. Much of Nick Fury's supporting cast originated in the feature and many of the devices used by these characters were often used in other comics published by Marvel.

== Background ==
Nick Fury debuted in May 1963, in Sgt. Fury and his Howling Commandos; a World War II themed comic which followed Sgt. Nick Fury and his fellow soldiers on various missions against agents of Nazi Germany. Sgt. Fury was an immediate hit for Marvel and the character was incorporated into the greater Marvel Universe in Fantastic Four #21, by the end of 1963. Seeing the commercial success of the character, Stan Lee decided to create a second Nick Fury series to run concurrently with the World War II-centric Sgt Fury. Fury, who was a plain-clothed secret agent with an eye patch over one of his eyes in his Fantastic Four guest appearance, would be turned into a secret agent in his new contemporary series: Nick Fury, Agent of S.H.I.E.L.D.

== Publication history ==
Seen here in Strange Tales #168 (May 1968) Valentina Allegra de Fontaine's back side under the yellow belt has been completely blacked out, removing any lines to denote her cheeks that were in the original artwork by Steranko.

=== Under Lee and Kirby ===
Strange Tales #135 (Aug 1965) had the first 12-page story featuring S.H.I.E.L.D. and the terrorist organization HYDRA with Nick Fury, now a superspy instead of a soldier as in most of his previous appearances. This was to take advantage of the contemporary The Man from U.N.C.L.E. and James Bond fad. Written by Stan Lee and Jack Kirby, with Kirby also providing the artwork, it introduced many iconic features of the Marvel Comics universe. Kirby and Lee created the Helicarrier and the Life Model Decoys, which became trademark gadgets and recurring plot devices for almost all future Nick Fury stories. The debut cover was drawn by Kirby and Frank Giacoia.

=== Under Steranko ===
"Nick Fury, Agent of S.H.I.E.L.D." was taken over by Jim Steranko in issue #155 (April 1967), who had previously done penciling and coloring for the feature beginning in Strange Tales #151 (Dec. 1966). Steranko was an innovative new talent that emerged at Marvel during the late 1960s, as he helped revolutionize the look of the comic book page with his "pop" artwork. Steranko pioneered art movements of the day such as and op art psychedelia in the comic, built on the longtime work of Kirby with photomontage, and created comics' first four-page spread – this also was inspired by Kirby, who in the Golden Age of comics had introduced the first full-page and double-page spreads. Steranko's plotlines involved adult intrigue, sexuality that was barely hidden away from the page, and hip sci-fi that was in vogue at the time of psychedelics in the 1960s. He also created his own version of the Bond girls, essentially, in skintight leather, pushing what was allowed under the Comics Code at the time. The Comics Code Authority demanded several panels in one landmark issue be to redrawn and censored. Many times during his run on the feature, his art was censored, especially on the female characters. Nick Fury's love interest La Contessa Valentina Allegra de la Fontaine often had line and coloring removed from the art on her body to decrease buttocks or cleavage, many times with the cleavage lines erased altogether. In one story, her buttocks were completely blanked in the published issue. "Nick Fury, Agent of S.H.I.E.L.D." was the first Strange Tales feature to receive its own cover logo below the main title with Strange Tales #150 (Nov. 1966).

== Prints ==
=== Strange Tales releases ===
| | Issue (Cover Date) | Story title | Writers | Pencillers | Inkers | Notes |
|---|---|---|---|---|---|---|
| 1 | #135 (August 1965) | The Man For the Job | Stan Lee; Jack Kirby | Jack Kirby | Dick Ayers | First appearance of Supreme Headquarters, International Espionage and Law-Enforcement Division (S.H.I.E.L.D.), Hydra, the Helicarrier, and Life Model Decoys |
| 2 | #136 (September 1965) | Find Fury or Die! | Stan Lee; Jack Kirby | Jack Kirby; John Severin | John Severin | |
| 3 | #137 (October 1965) | The Prize Is... Earth! | Stan Lee; Jack Kirby | Jack Kirby; John Severin | John Severin | Dum Dum Dugan and Gabe Jones join S.H.I.E.L.D. |
| 4 | #138 (November 1965) | Sometimes the Good Guys Lose! | Stan Lee; Jack Kirby | Jack Kirby; John Severin | John Severin | |
| 5 | #139 (December 1965) | The Brave Die Hard! | Stan Lee; Jack Kirby | Jack Kirby; Joe Sinnott | Joe Sinnott | |
| 6 | #140 (January 1966) | The End of HYDRA | Stan Lee; Jack Kirby | Jack Kirby; Don Heck | Joe Sinnott | |
| 7 | #141 (February 1966) | Operation: Brain Blast! | Stan Lee; Jack Kirby | Jack Kirby | Frank Giacoia | |
| 8 | #142 (March 1966) | Who Strikes at --- S.H.I.E.L.D.? | Stan Lee; Jack Kirby | Jack Kirby | Mike Esposito | |
| 9 | #143 (April 1966) | To Free a Brain Slave! | Stan Lee; Jack Kirby | Jack Kirby; Howard Purcell | Mike Esposito | |
| 10 | #144 (May 1966) | The Day of the Druid! | Stan Lee; Jack Kirby | Jack Kirby; Howard Purcell | Mike Esposito | First appearance of Jasper Sitwell |
| 11 | #145 (June 1966) | Lo! The Eggs Shall Hatch! | Stan Lee; Jack Kirby | Jack Kirby; Don Heck | Mike Esposito | |
| 12 | #146 (July 1966) | When the Unliving Strike! | Stan Lee; Jack Kirby | Jack Kirby; Don Heck | Mike Esposito | First appearance of Advanced Idea Mechanics (A.I.M.) |
| 13 | #147 (August 1966) | The Enemy Within! | Stan Lee; Jack Kirby | Jack Kirby; Don Heck | Dick Ayers | |
| 14 | #148 (September 1966) | Death Before Dishonor! | Jack Kirby | Jack Kirby; Don Heck | Don Heck | |
| 15 | #149 (October 1966) | The End of A.I.M.! | Dennis O'Neil; Jack Kirby | Jack Kirby; Ogden Whitney | Ogden Whitney | |
| 16 | #150 (November 1966) | Hydra Lives! | Stan Lee; Jack Kirby | Jack Kirby; John Buscema | Frank Giacoia | |
| 17 | #151 (December 1966) | Overkill! | Stan Lee; Jack Kirby | Jack Kirby; Jim Steranko | Jim Steranko | First issue drawn by Jim Steranko |
| 18 | #152 (January 1967) | The Power of SHIELD! | Stan Lee; Jack Kirby | Jack Kirby; Jim Steranko | Jim Steranko | |
| 19 | #153 (February 1967) | The Hiding Place! | Roy Thomas; Jack Kirby | Jack Kirby; Jim Steranko | Jim Steranko | |
| 20 | #154 (March 1967) | Beware...The Deadly Dreadnought! | Jim Steranko; Roy Thomas | Jim Steranko | Jim Steranko | First issue plotted by Jim Steranko |
| 21 | #155 (April 1967) | Death Trap! | Jim Steranko | Jim Steranko | Jim Steranko | First issue written, penciled, and inked entirely by Jim Steranko |
| 22 | #156 (May 1967) | The Tribunal! | Jim Steranko | Jim Steranko | Jim Steranko | |
| 23 | #157 (June 1967) | Crisis! | Jim Steranko | Jim Steranko | Jim Steranko | |
| 24 | #158 (July 1967) | Final Encounter! | Jim Steranko | Jim Steranko | Jim Steranko | |
| 25 | #159 (August 1967) | Spy School | Jim Steranko | Jim Steranko | Jim Steranko | First appearance of Valentina Allegra de Fontaine. Guest appearance by Captain America |
| 26 | #160 (September 1967) | Project: Blackout, Part 1 | Jim Steranko | Jim Steranko | Jim Steranko | Return of Jimmy Woo. Guest appearance by Captain America |
| 27 | #161 (October 1967) | Project: Blackout! Part II - The Second Doom | Jim Steranko | Jim Steranko | Jim Steranko | Guest appearance by Captain America |
| 28 | #162 (November 1967) | So Evil, the Night! | Jim Steranko | Jim Steranko | Frank Giacoia | Guest appearance by Captain America |
| 29 | #163 (December 1967) | And the Dragon Cried... Death! | Jim Steranko | Jim Steranko | Frank Giacoia | First appearance of Clay Quartermain |
| 30 | #164 (January 1968) | Beware...The Deadly Dreadnought! | Jim Steranko | Jim Steranko | Bill Everett | |
| 31 | #165 (February 1968) | Behold the Savage Sky! | Jim Steranko | Jim Steranko | Frank Giacoia | |
| 32 | #166 (March 1968) | If Death Be My Destiny! | Jim Steranko | Jim Steranko | Joe Sinnott | |
| 33 | #167 (April 1968) | Armageddon! | Jim Steranko | Jim Steranko | Joe Sinnott | Four-page spread |
| 34 | #168 (May 1968) | Today Earth Died! | Jim Steranko | Jim Steranko | Joe Sinnott | |

=== Collected editions ===
- Son of Origins of Marvel Comics includes "Nick Fury, Agent of S.H.I.E.L.D." story from Strange Tales #135, 249 pages, October 1975, ISBN 978-0-671-22166-9
- Marvel Masterworks: Nick Fury, Agent of S.H.I.E.L.D.
  - Vol. 1 collects Strange Tales #135–153, Tales of Suspense #78, and Fantastic Four #21, 288 pages, September 2007, ISBN 978-0-7851-2686-7
  - Vol. 2 collects Strange Tales #154–168 and Nick Fury, Agent of S.H.I.E.L.D. #1–3, 272 pages, December 2009, ISBN 978-0-7851-3503-6
- Steranko is Revolutionary! collects Nick Fury stories from Strange Tales #135–168, 336 pages, September 2020, ISBN 978-1302922894

== Reception ==
Steranko won Alley Awards in 1968 in the categories of "Best Pencil Artist" and "Best Feature Story" for "Today Earth Died" in Strange Tales #168.

Writer Steven Ringgenberg assessed that "Steranko's Marvel work became a benchmark of '60s pop culture, combining the traditional comic book art styles of Wally Wood and Jack Kirby with the surrealism of Richard Powers and Salvador Dalí. Steeped in cinematic techniques picked up from that medium's masters, Jim synthesized ... an approach different from anything being done in mainstream comics."

Entertainment Weekly observed that Steranko "elevated 12-cent rags into modern art, with mature themes and storytelling innovations that attacked the page and stripped it of its strictly formatted structure."

In 2017, The Slings & Arrows Graphic Novel Guide praised Steranko's art, stating "He was the first Marvel era artist to step definitively away from Kirby’s shorthand dynamics, introducing greater delicacy, and a view of the comic page as a single entity as well as a progression of panels." The same review continued that "The writing is never as imaginative, Fury all too often relying on some amazing device to extricate himself from his James Bond influenced predicaments."

=== Sales ===
- 1965: Strange Tales was the 53rd best-selling comic book series in the United States with an average of 230,285 copies sold per issue.
- 1966: Strange Tales was the 36th best-selling comic book series in the United States with an average of 261,069 copies sold per issue.
- 1967: Strange Tales was the 45th best-selling comic book series in the United States with an average of 241,561 copies sold per issue.
- 1968: Strange Tales was the 32nd best-selling comic book series in the United States with an average of 266,422 copies sold per issue. This includes sales of the series after the title changed to Doctor Strange as of issue #169 (June 1968).
