= Star Reach (comics) =

Independent comic books

- Star*Reach #1 (April 1974), featuring the space pirate Cody Starbuck. Cover by Howard Chaykin

Publication information
- Publisher: Star*Reach
- Schedule: Irregular
- Format: Ongoing series
- Genre: superhero, science fiction, fantasy
- Publication date: April 1974 – October 1979
- No. of issues: 18

Creative team
- Written by: Various
- Artist: Various
- Editor: Mike Friedrich

Star Reach (also spelled Star*Reach) was an American science fiction and fantasy comics anthology published from 1974 to 1979 by Mike Friedrich.

== Publication history ==
One of the first American mainstream independent comic books, Star*Reach bridged the gap between the countercultural underground comics and traditional Marvel/DC Comics fare, providing mature genre stories for an adult audience. The fan press of the time referred to this and the comics magazine Heavy Metal as "ground-level publications". Along with such other examples as Flo Steinberg's Big Apple Comix, published in 1975, and Harvey Pekar's naturalistic everyman series American Splendor, first published in 1976, Star*Reach was a forerunner of the late-1970s rise of the modern graphic novel, and of the 1980s' independent comics.

Star*Reach #7 (January 1977) Cover by Barry Windsor-Smith

Eighteen issues were released between 1974 and 1979. Contributors included such Marvel and DC writers and artists as Howard Chaykin, Jim Starlin, and Barry Windsor-Smith. It also included prose short stories by such authors as Roger Zelazny, whose 13-page "The Doors of His Face, The Lamps of His Mouth", with illustrations by Gray Morrow, appeared in issue #12 (March 1978).

Friedrich's company grew into a small publishing house in Hayward, California, also called Star*Reach, that published the comic book series Quack; Imagine; and Lee Marrs' Pudge, Girl Blimp, along with a number of one-shot comics. The company ceased publishing in 1979.

Eclipse Comics repackaged some of the original Star*Reach and Imagine material as Star*Reach Classics in 1984.

== Sources ==
- Richard Arndt, Mike Friedrich, The Star Reach Companion, TwoMorrows Publishing, 2013.
