= Captain America and Nick Fury: Blood Truce =

1995 comic book one-shot

- Cover of the issue.

Publication information
- Publisher: Marvel Comics
- Genre: Spy, superhero
- Publication date: February – February 1995
- No. of issues: 1
- Main character(s): Captain America; Nick Fury

Creative team
- Written by: Howard Chaykin; Ben Schwartz
- Penciller: Andrew Currie
- Inker: Thomas 'Tom' Palmer Sr.
- Letterer: John Costanza
- Colorist: Joe Rosas
- Editor(s): Michael 'Mike' Marts; Nelson 'Nel' Yomtov

Captain America and Nick Fury: Blood Truce, also known as Captain America/Nick Fury: Blood Truce, is a fortyeight page comic book one-shot published by Marvel Comics in 1995.

== Publication history ==
The one-shot was written by Howard Chaykin, who had worked on many other Nick Fury projects before and Ben Schwartz. It was published on February 1, 1995.

== Plot ==
Captain America and Nick Fury uncover a rogue faction of S.H.I.E.L.D. operatives determined to undermine a delicate international situation brought about by the defection of former KGB interrogator Dimitri Panshin. The rogue faction seek to make Panshin pay for his crimes. Only by siding with the Titanium Man, and A.I.M., can they save the world from an onslaught of nuclear holocaust.

== Reception ==
The reviewer of NickFuryAgentofShield.com stated that although the comic features a lot of common tropes of Nick Fury stories it has some really nice art and dialogue. The book was ranked second on Diamonds highest selling paperbacks in February 1995.

== See also ==
- 1995 in comics
