= Nick Fury (comic book) =

Comic book series published by Marvel Comics

- Cover to the first issue, art by ACO

Publication information
- Publisher: Marvel Comics
- Format: Ongoing series
- Genre: Superhero
- Publication date: 2017
- No. of issues: 6
- Main character: Nick Fury Jr.

Creative team
- Written by: James Dale Robinson
- Artist(s): ACO; Hugo Petrus; Rachelle Rosenberg
- Penciller: ACO
- Inker: Hugo Petrus
- Letterer: Travis Lanham
- Colorist: Rachelle Rosenberg
- Editor(s): Mark Basso; Christina Harrington; Mark Paniccia

Nick Fury is a 2017 ongoing comic book series published by Marvel Comics. The series is written by James Dale Robinson and primarily drawn by ACO. It is the first series to feature Nick Fury Jr. as its main character.

== Background ==
The artist ACO has stated that his art for the series is an attempt to recapture the feel of Jim Steranko's original Nick Fury, Agent of S.H.I.E.L.D. series from the 60s.

== Plot ==
S.H.I.E.L.D. agent Nick Fury Jr. is sent on a top-secret mission to the French Riviera. He'll need to outmaneuver the enemy as the complex dance of espionage begins when he encounters Frankie Noble.

== Reception ==
The first three issues have received an average rating of 8.6 by 27 professional critics according to review aggregation website Comic Book Roundup.

In his review for IGN, Jesse Schedeen said the series tries to give Nick Fury Jr. a place in the Marvel Universe five years after his introduction, but that "Fury #1 is very much a case of style over substance" that is inspired by James Bond and Nick Fury: Agent of S.H.I.E.L.D.. Schedeen thought the art was great, but he did not feel any depth in Robinson's portrayal of Fury.

Matt Santori of Comicosity was more positive in his review, saying the book was Marvel's most charming adventure comic in years as well as having the prettiest art in a long while. He added that the artist team is good at violating conventional panel structure while still keeping the visual narrative comprehensible. Mark Peters of Paste said the comic's story is as simple as its art is complex and that it embraces Jim Steranko's mission to redefine the Nick Fury mythos from its roots. He goes on to say that the groundwork is laid for what he hopes may be a lengthy run of the series.

Pierce Lydon of Newsarama felt the main attraction of the book is its psychedelic art, stating that "Marvel says that artists aren't the ones selling books but ACO is the main draw here and it's easy to see why." The A.V. Club's Oliver Sava praised Rosenberg's coloring in his review. Kotaku's Charles Pulliam-Moore, praised the series, calling it a breath of fresh air compared to Marvel's other humorless contemporary series.

== Prints ==
Issue	Title	Cover date	Comic Book Roundup rating	Estimated sales (first month)
#1	The Sky High Caper	June 2017	8.2 by seventeen professional critics.	31,683, ranked 68th in North America
#2	The Samurai and Moonbeams Caper	July 2017	7.0 by three professional critics.	16,690, ranked 144th in North America
#3	The Assassination Locomotion Caper	August 2017	9.2 by five professional critics.	16,690, ranked 174th in North America
#4	The Deep Blue Sea Caper	September 2017	—N/a	10,973, ranked 177th in North America
#5	The Sleepy Little Town Caper	October 2017	9.8 by two professional critics.	9,145, ranked 220 in North America
#6	The Return to Ravenlock Castle Caper	November 2017	—N/a	9,014, ranked 198 in North America
