= Fury of S.H.I.E.L.D. =

Comic book miniseries

- Cover of issue 3, by Corky C. Lehmkuhl and Mark McKenna

Publication information
- Publisher: Marvel Comics
- Format: Ongoing series
- No. of issues: 4
- Main character: Nick Fury

Creative team
- Written by: Howard Chaykin
- Penciller: Corky C. Lehmkuhl
- Inker: Mark McKenna
- Letterer: Richard Alan Starkings
- Colorist: Tom Smith
- Editor(s): Bobbie E. Chase; Mariano Nicieza; Nancy Poletti

Fury of S.H.I.E.L.D. is a comic book miniseries written by Howard Chaykin and drawn by Corky C. Lehmkuhl. Published by Marvel Comics in 1995.

== Publication history ==
The first three issues were marketed with at least one tagline, "The Legendary Agent of S.H.I.E.L.D. in an Explosive New Series!" for the first, "Guest Starring the Invincible Iron Man! and "Kill or Be Killed!" for the second and "Guest Starring the Invincible Iron Man" again as well as "Deadly Allies!" for the third. All of the issues also included the text " Special Contest! Details Inside!" on the covers.

== Plot ==
Fury attempts to reestablish S.H.I.E.L.D. after its destruction.

== Reception ==
Lesley Goldberg of The Hollywood Reporter stated that the series is a great Nick Fury story and that it is helpful to understand the character since it focuses on how he runs S.H.I.E.L.D. Marc Buxton of Den of Geek expressed that despite failing to produce a new ongoing which it was trying to lead into the series still stands out as a highlight of 1990s Marvel.

== Prints ==
Number	Title	Cover date	Comic Book Roundup rating	Estimated sales (first month)
#1	Hell Hath No Fury, Part One: Cherchez La Femme	April 1995	—N/a	25.8 thousand, ranked 84th in North America
#2	Hell Hath No Fury, Part Two: Stop in the Name of Love	May 1995	—N/a	23.1 thousand, ranked 153th in North America
#3	Hell Hath No Fury, Part Three: Stand By Your Man	June 1995	—N/a	20.0 thousand, ranked 173th in North America
#4	Town without Pity	July 1995	—N/a	20.94 thousand, ranked 189th in North America

== See also ==
- 1995 in comics
