= Nick's World =

Comic book story by Grant Morrison

- Cover to Marvel Knights: Double Shot #2 which features "Nick's World", with art by Glenn Fabry (Note: The Man-Thing appears on the cover because he takes part in the second story of the issue named Memories of Green, which was written and drawn by Ted McKeever and has nothing to do with "Nick's World".)

Publication information
- Publisher: Marvel Comics; Marvel Knights
- Schedule: Single
- Format: One-shot
- Genre: Superhero; Spy comics
- Publication date: July 2002
- No. of issues: 1
- Main character: Nick Fury

Creative team
- Created by: Grant Morrison
- Written by: Grant Morrison
- Artist: Manuel Gutierrez
- Penciller: Manuel Gutierrez
- Inker: Manuel Gutierrez
- Letterer(s): Wes Abbott (Note: Credited as just Wes); Richard Alan Starkings (Note: Credited as just RS) (With Comicraft)
- Colorist(s): Jeromy Cox (with Avalon Studios)
- Editor(s): Nanci Dakesian; Kelly Lamy; Stuart Moore

"Nick's World" (also known as "Nick's World...") is a twelve-page comic book story featured in the second issue of Marvel Knights: Double Shot written by Grant Morrison and drawn by Manuel Gutiérrez. The story concerns a young spy who tries to trick Nick Fury. The story was originally intended to be a part of a much longer series but after the follow-up series proposal was declined by Marvel, Morrison incorporated much of the psychedelic super-spy material into the Vertigo title The Filth.

It was Morrison's only solo Marvel Knights story.

== Publication history ==
The story was first published in 2002 under the Marvel Knights imprint. It was then reprinted in Marvel Crossover #33 and again in 2011 in Fantastic Four: 1234.

In Italy, the story has been published in Spider-Man #388.

== Plot ==
The story begins with Nick Fury and a female agent talking about his car needing a new tire. The page gets cut and a new figure is introduced, a man in a strange get up who explains who Nick Fury is and reveals that the scene is just a training exercise with a young spy named Chris Kong who is strapped into a machine which makes him experience moments out of Fury's life in an attempt to mimic him perfectly so that he can infiltrate S.H.I.E.L.D. and replace Fury. It is also revealed that the man is in the company of some alien-like creatures. The man tells Kong that it is not enough that he is a master of disguise but that he must truly become like Fury, think, act and feel like him since S.H.I.E.L.D. has telepaths superior to those they work with. The man also reveals that Kong has failed every mission so far in rather embarrassing ways, he lost at the roulette table, accidentally killed a cat instead of its megalomaniac owner and failed the most recent one which they just attempted.

Kong tells the man that he seems to make small mistakes that lead to total disaster. The man then tells him that he clearly lacks some quality that Fury possesses, Kong agrees and says that he must begin his physical transformation into Fury and complies with having one of his eyes amputated. The man states that, now that Kong is wearing Fury's trademark eye-patch, maybe now he will bring more of his fire to the simulation. Kong answers that he feels a lot more like Fury and tells them to run the machine again. The page cuts back to the scene with the car, where suddenly a man in a parachute lands on Kong and the woman and they are dragged into the road, where they are run over by several cyclists. An upset Kong exclaims that this cannot be happening since he is Nick Fury and that would not ever happen to him. The man reappears and tells Kong that he is far from being Nick Fury and that he has failed yet again.

The story ends with the reveal that Kong's superior is actually Nick Fury himself and some S.H.I.E.L.D. agents disassembling the set on which the story has taken place.

== Reception ==
The story has been described as a cross and double-cross, Steranko-esque spy surrealness, and "James Bond meets cosmic 70's Kirby" story.

Comic Book Resources called the story the 9th greatest Nick Fury story ever. They stated that the story "Both examines how difficult it is to be Nick Fury while also showing the bizarre lengths Nick Fury will go to protect his place in the world." Brian Cronin has also stated that the story was a strong look at a theme Morrison later explored in the pages of Final Crisis – the notion that there are certain people (here Nick Fury; in Final Crisis Batman) that you just cannot duplicate, because they are truly unique individuals. "It's an interesting (and humorous) ode to the coolness of Nick Fury. Gutierrez does a fine job on the artwork."

== See also ==
- 2002 in comics
