= Janice Chiang =

American comic-book letterer

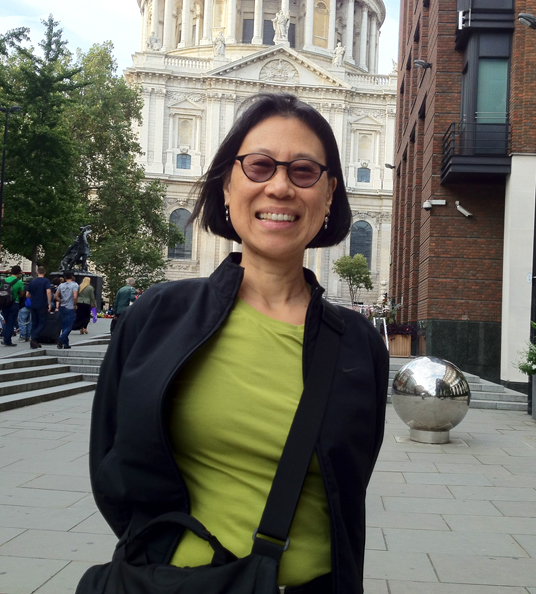
- Born: December 28, 1955 (age 70)
- Area: Letterer
- Notable works: Conan the Barbarian; Alpha Flight; Transformers; Visionaries; Rom

Janice Chiang (born December 28, 1955) is an American comic-book letterer with over forty years’ experience in the industry.

== Career ==
Chiang broke into comics in the mid-1970s, freelancing for Marvel Comics. Her career really took off in 1981, and throughout the 1980s and up until the mid-1990s she kept extremely busy, often lettering up to ten books a month. Titles Chiang has been particularly associated with include Transformers, Visionaries, Rom, Conan the Barbarian (1982–1990), Alpha Flight (1987–1994), Iron Man (1987–1990), Ghost Rider vol. 2 (1990–1996), What If? (1990–1995), and Impulse (1999–2002). Since the late 1990s her credits have not been as frequent, but she has maintained a steady output. Chiang's manga lettering work on series CHIKYU MISAKI and EMMA were both honored by being chosen as book of the month by NewType magazine which reviewed new anime and manga releases.

Presently, Chiang is working with Stan Lee's POW! Entertainment, Storm King Comics, John Carpenter's ASYLUM, John Carpenter's Tales For A Halloween Night Volumes 1 and 2, John Carpenter's Tales of Science Fiction VAULT series, DC Entertainment in the comic branch lettering DC SUPER HERO GIRLS graphic novels and digital stories, Pete Ford of Resolution Independent, and various independent projects.

Comics Alliance honored Chiang as Outstanding Letterer of 2016 and ComicBook.com gave her the 2017 Golden Issue Award for Lettering. In May 2017, Chiang was featured as one of 13 women who have been making comics since before the internet on the blog Women Write About Comics. She was also quoted in an article about veteran Marvel inker Joe Sinnott. Had her Biography featured in DC WOMEN IN ACTION. And was featured in an interview talking about MARVEL VOICES 2022 in celebration of Asian American Pacific Islander Month.

== Personal life ==
Chiang lives in upstate New York.

== Awards ==
In 2023, Chiang was a recipient of the Inkpot Award at the annual San Diego Comic Con.

== Notes ==
San Diego Comic-Con 2023 Inkpot Award Recipient https://www.firstcomicsnews.com/sdcc-janice-chiang-spotlight/ Guest of Honor at San Diego Comic-Con 2023
