= Howard Chaykin =

American comic book artist and writer (born 1950)

- Chaykin at GalaxyCon Des Moines in 2026
- Born: Howard Victor Chaykin; October 7, 1950 (age 76) Newark, New Jersey, U.S.
- Areas: Writer, Penciller, Inker
- Pseudonym: Eric Pave
- Notable works: Dominic Fortune; Cody Starbuck; American Flagg!
- Awards: Inkpot Award, 1977; 7 Eagle Awards, 1984; Eagle Award, 2006

Howard Victor Chaykin (/ˈtʃeɪkɪn/; born October 7, 1950) is an American comic book artist and writer. Chaykin's influences include his one-time employer and mentor, Gil Kane, and the mid-20th century illustrators Robert Fawcett and Al Parker. His career, which started out as a gofer for Gil Kane at the age of 19, spanned working for various comic book artists and writers, ultimately arriving at developing and drawing his own characters alone and in collaborations during the course of 50 years. He worked for nearly all the biggest publishers, including DC Comics, Marvel Comics, First Comics, and Epic Comics. Beyond the realm of comics, his work can be found in graphic books and television animated shows.

== Early life ==
Howard Chaykin was born in Newark, New Jersey, to Rosalind Pave and Norman Drucker, who soon separated. Chaykin was initially raised by his grandparents in Staten Island, New York City, until his mother married Leon Chaykin in 1953 and the family moved to East Flatbush and later to 370 Saratoga Avenue, Brownsville, Brooklyn. At 14, Chaykin moved with his now divorced mother to the Kew Gardens section of Queens. He said in 2000 he was raised on welfare after his parents separated and that his absent biological father eventually was declared dead, although Chaykin, as an adult, located him alive. Chaykin's "nutty and cruel" adoptive father, whom Chaykin until the 1990s believed was his biological father, encouraged Chaykin's interest in drawing and bought him sketchbooks.

Chaykin was introduced to comics by his cousin, who gave him a refrigerator box filled with them. He graduated from Jamaica High School at 16, in 1967; in mid-1968, Chaykin worked at Zenith Press. He attended Columbia College in Chicago that fall, but left school and returned to New York the following year. Chaykin said that after high school, "I hitchhiked around the country" before becoming, at 19, a "gofer" for the New York City–based comic book artist Gil Kane, whom he would name as his greatest influence.

== Career ==
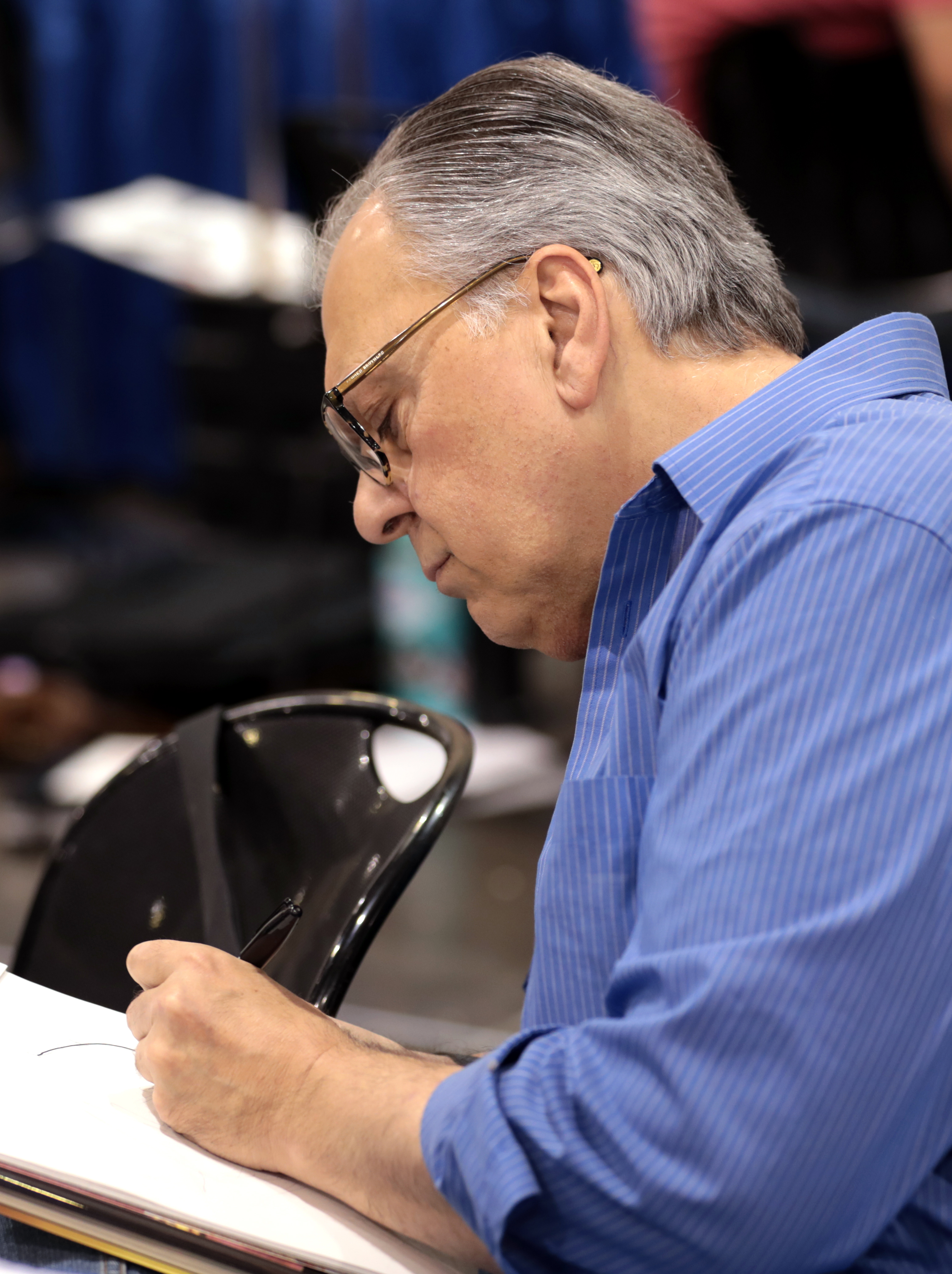
Chaykin in May 2019

Chaykin's earliest work with comic books was under the tutelage of Gil Kane, whom he would later call his mentor.

I'd heard on the grapevine that Gil's assistant had dropped dead of a heart attack at 23. I gave Gil a call, and he said, 'Yeah, I can use you.' So I went to work for him. ... He was doing [the early graphic novel] Blackmark, and I did a really bad job pasting up the dialog and putting in [Zip-a-Tone].... It was a great apprenticeship. I learned a lot from watching Gil work.

In 1970, he began publishing his art in comics and science-fiction fanzines, sometimes under the pseudonym Eric Pave. Leaving Kane, he began working as an assistant to comics artist Wally Wood in the studio he shared with Syd Shores and Jack Abel in Valley Stream, Long Island. He worked there for a "couple of months", and in 1971 published his first professional comics work, for the adult-theme Western feature Shattuck in the military newspaper the Overseas Weekly, one of Wood's clients. He also "ghosted some stuff" for Gray Morrow: "I penciled a Man-Thing story he did [for Marvel Comics' Fear #10 (cover-dated Oct. 1972)], and I penciled a thing for [the magazine] National Lampoon called "Michael Rockefeller and the Jungles of New Guinea." He then apprenticed under Neal Adams, working with the artist at Adams' home in The Bronx. This led to his first work at DC Comics, one of the two largest comics companies:

Neal showed me to [editors] Murray Boltinoff and Julius Schwartz. Murray gave me a one-page filler. I also got some work from Dorothy Woolfolk, who edited the love comics. It was all just dreadful stuff, but you stumble along, and you learn. A problem for me was that by the time I became a professional, I lost any interest whatsoever in superhero comics. I'm not a horror [comics] guy, and I didn't know what the hell to do! (laughter) What I wanted to draw is guys with guns, guys with swords, and women with big tits, and that was the extent of my interest in comics at the time.

The "one-page filler", titled "Strange Neighbor", was inventoried and eventually published in the Boltinoff-edited Secrets of Sinister House #17 (May 1974). His other earliest known DC work was penciling and inking the three-page story "Not Old Enough!" in Young Romance #185 (Aug. 1972), and penciling the eight-page supernatural story "Eye of the Beholder" in Forbidden Tales of Dark Mansion #7 (Oct. 1972) and the one-page "Enter the Portals of Weird War" in Weird War Tales #9 (Dec. 1972).

At one point Chaykin lived in the same Queens apartment building as artists Allen Milgrom, Walter Simonson, and Bernie Wrightson. Simonson recalls, "We'd get together at 3 a.m. They'd come up and we'd have popcorn and sit around and talk about whatever a 26, 27, and 20-year-old guys talk about. Our art, TV, you name it. I pretty much knew at the time, 'These are the good ole days.'"

=== 1970s ===
Chaykin's first major work was for DC Comics drawing the 23-page "The Price of Pain Ease"—writer Denny O'Neil's adaptation of author Fritz Leiber's characters Fafhrd and the Gray Mouser—in Sword of Sorcery #1 (March 1973). Although the title was well received, it lasted only five issues before cancellation. Chaykin plotted and drew three issues of the character Ironwolf in the science fiction anthology title Weird Worlds for DC, which he credits as demonstrating the origins of his adult-oriented stories later in his career. In 1974, Chaykin did the pencils and inks for a 12-page Batman story written by Archie Goodwin and published in Detective Comics #441. In 2018, he looked back on this Batman story as one of the worst things he had ever drawn, adding, "Anything of value in that story was Archie's." Moving to Marvel Comics, he began work as co-artist with Neal Adams on the first Killraven story, seen in Amazing Adventures #18 (May 1973).

After this, Chaykin was given various adventure strips to draw for Marvel, including his own creation, Dominic Fortune (inspired by his Scorpion character, originally drawn for Atlas Comics), now in the pages of Marvel Preview. In 1978, he wrote and drew his Cody Starbuck character for the anthology title Star Reach, one of the first independent titles of the 1970s. These strips saw him explore more adult themes as best he could within the restrictions imposed on him by editors and the Comics Code Authority. The same year, he produced for Schanes & Schanes a six-plate portfolio showcasing his character.

In 1976, Chaykin landed the job of drawing the Marvel Comics adaptation of the first Star Wars film, written by Roy Thomas. Chaykin left the series after 10 issues to work in more adult and experimental comics and to create paperback book covers.

In late 1978, Chaykin, Walt Simonson, Val Mayerik, and Jim Starlin formed Upstart Associates, a shared studio space on West 29th Street in New York City. The membership of the studio changed over time.

Chaykin penciled DC Comics' first miniseries, World of Krypton (July–September 1979).

In the next few years he produced material for Heavy Metal, drew a graphic novel adaptation of Alfred Bester's The Stars My Destination, and produced illustrations for works by Roger Zelazny. Chaykin collaborated on two original graphic novels—The Swords of Heaven, the Flowers of Hell with writer Michael Moorcock, and Empire with Samuel R. Delany—and found time to move into film design with work on the movie version of Heavy Metal.

=== 1980s ===
American Flagg #2 (Nov. 1983) by Chaykin. The piece shows off Chaykin's sense of design, clear lines, fashionable clothing, and American nostalgia and jingoism common to many of his works.

In 1980 he designed the album cover of The Legend of Jesse James, a concept album about legendary outlaw Jesse James.

Chaykin had a six-issue run on Marvel's Micronauts series, drawing issues from #13 (January 1980) to #18 (June 1980). He went back to Cody Starbuck with a story in Heavy Metal between May and September 1981, in the same painted art style he'd used for the Moorcock graphic novel.

In June 1980, a story that he collaborated on with Samuel R. Delany, called "Seven Moons' Light Casts Complex Shadows" was published in Marvel's Epic Illustrated #2.

In 1983, Chaykin launched American Flagg! for First Comics. With Chaykin as both writer and artist, the series was successful for First and proved highly influential, mixing all of Chaykin's previous ideas and interests—jazz, pulp adventure, science fiction and sex. Chaykin made wide use of Craftint Duoshade illustration boards, which in the period before computers allowed him to add a shaded texture to the finished art. American Flagg! made a huge splash at the 1984 Eagle Awards, the United Kingdom's pre-eminent comics awards. Chaykin and American Flagg! were nominated for ten awards, eventually winning seven.

After the first 26 issues of American Flagg!, Chaykin started work on new projects. Chaykin's involvement in his original run of the series was that of writer for 29 issues, interior artist for issues #1–12 and 15–26, and cover artist for issues #1–33. He returned to full art and writing for the American Flagg! Special one-shot in 1986. In 1988, the title was relaunched as Howard Chaykin's American Flagg!, which ran 12 issues.

The first new project was a revamp of The Shadow in a four-issue miniseries for DC Comics in 1986. Rather than setting the series in its traditional 1930s milieu, Chaykin updated it to a contemporary setting and included his own style of extreme violence. In a 2012 interview, Chaykin stated, "The reason I pulled him out of the period was because I thought it would be commercial suicide to do a period character at that point."

The American Flagg! Special one-shot introduced Chaykin's Time², a two-volume graphic-novel series with a heavy dose of jazz, film noir and a fantasy version of New York City: Time²: The Epiphany (ISBN 0-915419-07-6) and Time²: The Satisfaction of Black Mariah (ISBN 0-915419-23-8)). In 1987, Chaykin described plans for a third volume, saying, "It's probably going to be grossly different from the first two, because I'm taking things in another direction ... I want to do a story that is both very funny ... and at the same time very, very ugly. Really nasty and unpleasant. Because frankly, it's the place to do that sort of thing." Although Chaykin hoped it would be available in 1988, the third volume was finally published in Time² Omnibus, released in February 2024 through Image Comics.

Chaykin has described Time² as the single work about which he is most proud. "To tell you the truth, my first interest would be to do another Time² because that was a very personal product for me," he said in 2008. "It's a fantasia of my family's story."

Before returning to American Flagg!, Chaykin revamped another DC Comics character with Blackhawk, a three-issue miniseries about a team of heroic aviators, set in the 1930s.

In 1987, DC proposed a system of labeling comics for violent or sexual content, Chaykin with Alan Moore and Frank Miller boycotted DC and refused to work for the company.

In 1988, Chaykin created perhaps his most controversial title: Black Kiss, a 12-issue series published by Vortex Comics that contained his most explicit depictions of sex and violence, with a story of sex-obsessed vampires in Hollywood. Though Black Kiss shipped sealed in an "adults only" clear plastic bag, its content drew much criticism. This did not stop it from selling well enough for Chaykin to describe it as "probably, on a per-page basis, the most profitable book I've ever done."

=== 1990s ===
Chaykin returned to DC to write the three-issue miniseries Twilight, drawn by José Luis García-López and revamping some of DC's science-fiction heroes of the 1950s and 1960s, such as Tommy Tomorrow and Space Cabby. Later, Chaykin collaborated twice with artist Mike Mignola: In 1990–1991, they produced the Fafhrd and the Gray Mouser miniseries for Epic Comics with co-writer John Francis Moore and inker Al Williamson. This was followed with the Ironwolf: Fires of the Revolution graphic novel in 1992. Chaykin then wrote and illustrated Midnight Men for Marvel's Epic imprint in 1993. He co-created/designed Firearm for Malibu Comics that same year, and then with several colleagues formed the creator-owned Bravura imprint for Malibu Comics. Chaykin created the four-issue miniseries Power and Glory in 1994, a superhero-themed public relations satire.

In 1996, DC's Helix imprint published Cyberella, a cyberpunk dystopia written by Chaykin and drawn by Don Cameron.

Chaykin began to drift out of comics by the mid-1990s. With the exception of several Elseworlds stories he wrote for DC Comics, including Batman: Dark Allegiances which he wrote and drew in 1996, his comic output became minimal as he became more involved in film and television work. He was executive script consultant for the 1990–1991 The Flash television series on CBS, and later worked on action-adventure programs such as Viper, Earth: Final Conflict and Mutant X.

Near the end of the decade, Chaykin returned to comics and co-wrote with David Tischman the three-issue miniseries Pulp Fantastic for the Vertigo imprint of DC, with art by Rick Burchett.

=== 2000s ===
Chaykin began co-writing American Century with David Tischman for Vertigo. This story, set in post-war America, would be a pulp-adventure strip inspired by the likes of Terry and the Pirates as well as the EC Comics war stories created by Harvey Kurtzman. That year, Chaykin became part of the creative team on Mutant X, a television series inspired by the Marvel Comics series of mutant titles.

His next work was Mighty Love, a 96-page original graphic novel published in 2004 and described as "You've Got Mail with super-powers". This was acclaimed as a return to the type of work he did on American Flagg! and contained his first art in a title since the early 1990s.

That year, Chaykin and Tischman revamped Challengers of the Unknown in a six-issue mini-series for DC, as well as writing a mini-series about gangster vampires called Bite Club for Vertigo. The pair wrote Barnum!: In Secret Service to the USA, a graphic novel in which real-life showman P. T. Barnum comes to the aid of the U.S. government.

In 2005, Chaykin produced the six-part City of Tomorrow, a DC/Wildstorm production involving a futuristic city populated by gangster robots. Chaykin described the mini-series as "The Untouchables meets West World at Epcot." That same year, he wrote the four-issue mini-series Legend updating the character Hugo Danner for Wildstorm.

He illustrated 24 College Ave., a story serialized online in 54 chapters for ESPN.com's Page 2 section. ESPN.com columnist Jim Caple wrote the text, each episode of which was accompanied by a single-panel Chaykin drawing.

In 2006, he began working on his first superhero title for DC Comics, pencilling Hawkgirl, with Walter Simonson writing, starting with issue #50. With issue 56, he stopped drawing the series, mainly to get time to work on Marvel's Blade with Marc Guggenheim, although he continued to draw Hawkgirl covers for eight more issues.

Also in 2006, DC Comics published a two-page Black Canary origin story drawn by Chaykin for the series 52. Later that year, DC released Guy Gardner: Collateral Damage. The two-issue series, written and drawn by Chaykin, revolves around the Green Lantern Corps' role in an interstellar war.

After Blade was cancelled with issue 12, he pencilled issue 50 of Punisher, Wolverine (vol. 3) #56–61, Punisher War Journal (vol. 2) (#16–24) and an issue of Immortal Iron Fist. Chaykin illustrated the 2008 Marvel MAX comic War Is Hell: The First Flight of the Phantom Eagle, scripted by Garth Ennis. He wrote Supreme Power vol. 3 #1–12 (Sep. 2008 – July 2009) for Marvel. In 2009, he wrote and penciled Dominic Fortune.

=== 2010s ===
In 2010 he wrote Die Hard: Year One, a comic about John McClane from the Die Hard series for Boom! Studios. Marvel in June 2010 published a Rawhide Kid miniseries drawn by Chaykin and written by Ron Zimmerman.

Chaykin wrote and drew the Avengers 1959 five-issue miniseries, a spinoff of a storyline introduced in New Avengers. The first issue was released in October 2011.

Chaykin helmed a reboot of the science-fiction character Buck Rogers beginning in August 2013, again in the capacity of both artist and writer.

In 2018, Chaykin began Hey Kids! Comics!, a cynical parody of the history of the rise of the comics industry and the many creators exploited in the process (particularly those exploited by Marvel Comics). This Image Comics series was completed in September 2023 after three volumes and 17 total issues.

=== 2020s ===
In April 2022, Chaykin was reported among the more than three dozen comics creators who contributed to Operation USA's benefit anthology book, Comics for Ukraine: Sunflower Seeds, a project spearheaded by IDW Publishing Special Projects Editor Scott Dunbier, whose profits would be donated to relief efforts for Ukrainian refugees resulting from the February 2022 Russian invasion of Ukraine. Chaykin's contribution was a story featuring American Flagg!.

== Personal life ==
In 1972, Chaykin married Daina Graziunas. The marriage ended in 1977; the following year, he married Leslie Zahler. That marriage ended in 1986. In 1989, in Los Angeles, Chaykin married Jeni Munn, a union that lasted through 1992. In November 2002, in Ventura, Chaykin married Laurel Beth Rice.

As of 2013, Chaykin serves on the Disbursement Committee of the comic-book industry charity The Hero Initiative.

== Awards ==
- 1977 Inkpot Award
- 1978 Eagle Award nomination for Favourite Continued Story for Star Wars #1–6—"Film Adaptation"
- 1984 Eagle Award for Favourite Penciler
- 1984 Eagle Award for Favourite Inker
- 1984 Eagle Award for Favourite Writer
- 1984 Eagle Award for Favourite Comic (American Flagg!)
- 1984 Eagle Award for Favourite Single or Continued Story (American Flagg! #1–2, "Hard Times")
- 1984 Eagle Award for Favourite New Comic Title (American Flagg!
- 1984 Eagle Award nomination for Favourite Character (Reuben Flagg)
- 1984 Eagle Award nomination for Favourite Supporting Character (Raul the cat)
- 1984 Eagle Award nomination for Favourite Comic Cover (American Flagg! #2, "Back in the U.S.A.")
- 1984 Eagle Award nomination for Favourite Comic Cover (American Flagg! #3, "Killed in the Ratings")
- 2006 Eagle Award for Favourite Comics Writer/Artist

== Bibliography ==
His work as an artist (interior pencil art, except where noted) includes:

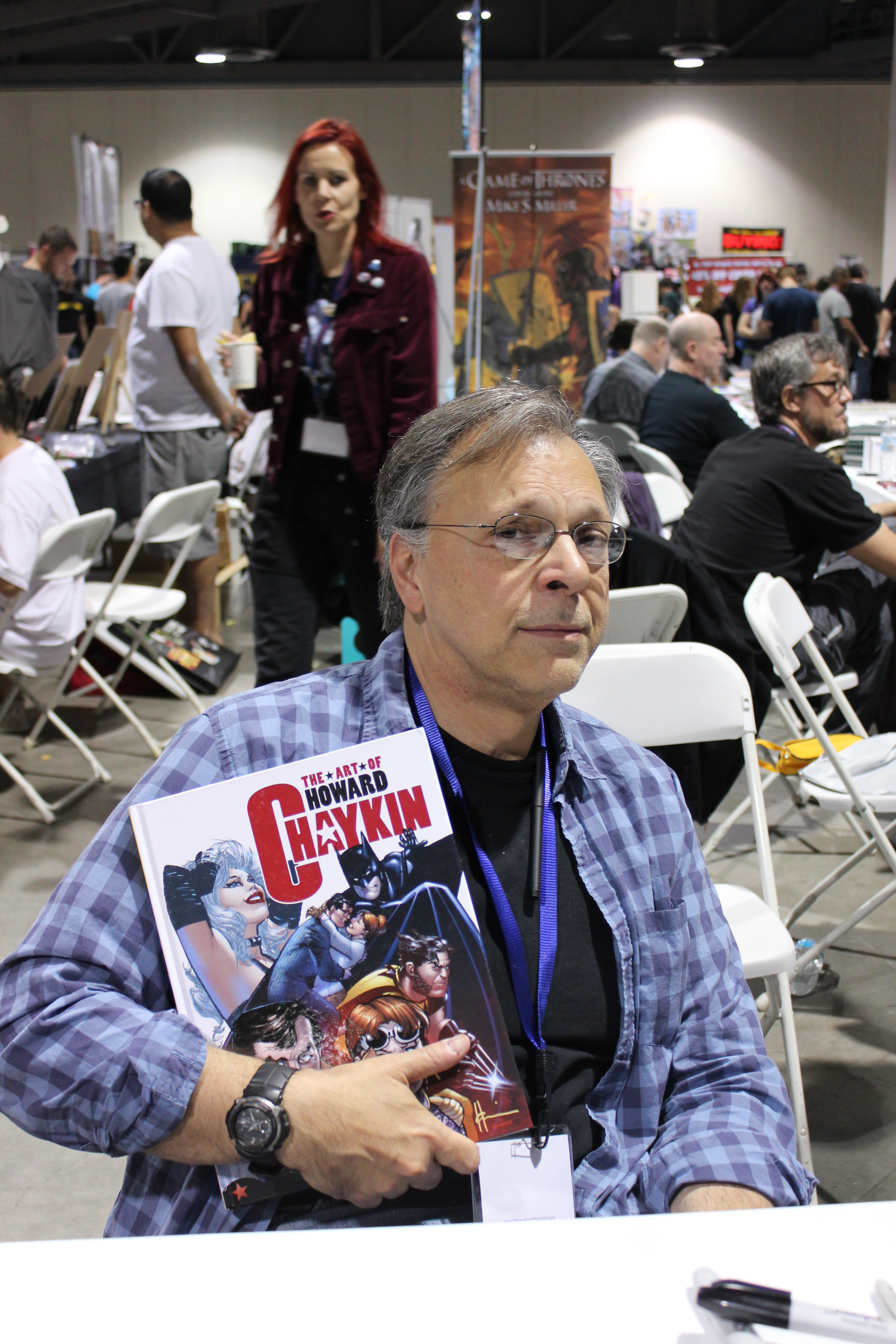
Chaykin in 2012

=== DC Comics ===
- Forbidden Tales of Dark Mansion #7 (1972)
- Sword of Sorcery (Fafhrd and the Gray Mouser) #1–4 (1973)
- Tarzan (backup story) #216 (1973)
- Weird Worlds (Ironwolf) #8–10 (1973–74)
- Detective Comics (Batman & Robin) #441 (1974); (Human Target) #483 (1979)
- Adventure Comics (Shining Knight) #438 (1975)
- Weird War Tales #40, 61–62, 67, 69, 76, 82 (1976–79)
- Batman Family #14 (1977)
- Weird Western Tales (Cinnamon) #49 (1978)
- Superboy and the Legion of Super-Heroes #240 (1978)
- Men of War (Enemy Ace) #9–10, 12–14, 19–20 (1978–79)
- World of Krypton (1979)
- Time Warp #2 (1979)
- House of Mystery #277 (1980)
- Blackhawk #260 (1983)
- The Shadow, miniseries, #1–4 (1985)
- Suicide Squad #1 (1987)
- Blackhawk, miniseries, #1–3 (writer/artist, 1988)
- Twilight (writer, 1990)
- Ironwolf, script, with John Francis Moore (1992)
- Batman Houdini, The Devil's Workshop (1993)
- Son of Superman OGN (co-writer, 1996)
- Batman: Dark Allegiances (writer/artist, 1996)
- Batman Black and White, miniseries, #1 (writer/artist, 1996)
- Cyberella (writer, 1996)
- Batgirl & Robin: Thrillkiller (writer, 1997)
- Orion #7 (co-writer/artist, 2000)
- American Century (co-writer, 2001–2003)
- Barnum!, Original Graphic Novel (co-writer, 2003)
- JSA: All-Stars, miniseries, #5 (2003)
- Challengers of the Unknown, miniseries, #1–6 (writer/artist, 2004)
- Bite Club, miniseries #1–6 (co-writer, 2004)
- Mighty Love graphic novel (writer/artist, 2004)
- City of Tomorrow, miniseries, #1–6 (writer/artist, 2005)
- Solo #4 (writer/artist, 2005)
- Bite Club: Vampire Crime Unit, miniseries, #1–6 (co-writer, 2006)
- Hawkgirl #50–56 (2006)
- Guy Gardner: Collateral Damage, miniseries, #1–2 (2007)
- Batman/Catwoman: Follow the Money (2010)
- DC Holiday Special '09 (Enemy Ace) #1 (2010)
- Justice Society of America 80-Page Giant #1 (among other artists) (2011)

=== Marvel Comics ===
- Adventure Into Fear #10 (1972)
- Chamber of Chills #4 (1973)
- Sub-Mariner (Tales of Atlantis) #62-64 (writer/artist)(1973)
- Amazing Adventures, vol. 2, (Killraven) #18 (with Neal Adams), 19 (1973)
- Kull and the Barbarians (Red Sonja) #2–3 (1975)
- Marvel Spotlight (Nick Fury) #31 (1976)
- Marvel Presents (Guardians of the Galaxy) #5 (1976)
- Conan the Barbarian #79–83 (1977–78)
- Star Wars #1–10 (1977–1978)
- Marvel Team-Up (Spider-Man) #76–77 (1978)
- Marvel Premiere #32 (Monark Starstalker) writer/artist (1976) #56 (Dominic Fortune) plot/layouts (1980)
- Marvel Comics Super Special #9, 19 (1978–81)
- Micronauts #13-18 (1980)
- Hulk! (Dominic Fortune) #21–25 (1980–81)
- Marvel Preview (Dominic Fortune) #2, #20 (1980)
- James Bond for Your Eyes Only #2 (1981)
- Wolverine/Nick Fury: The Scorpio Connection (1989)
- Fritz Leiber's Fafhrd and the Gray Mouser #1–4 (adaptation and script), Epic, (1990–91)
- Captain America and Nick Fury: Blood Truce (1995)
- Fury of S.H.I.E.L.D. (1995)
- Blade #1–12 (2006–07)
- The Immortal Iron Fist Annual #1 (among other artists) (2007)
- New Avengers #21 (2007)
- War is Hell: The First Flight of the Phantom Eagle, (pencils/inks) #1–5 (2008)
- Punisher War Journal, vol. 2, #16–25 (2008–09)
- Captain America Theater of War: America First! (2009)
- Captain America #600, 616 (among other artists) (2009–11)
- Dominic Fortune, #1–4 (2009)
- X-Men vs. Vampires, miniseries, #2 (2010)
- Magneto #1 (2010)
- Iron Man, vol. 5, (Tony Stark) #503 (2011)
- Avengers 1959, miniseries, #1–5 (writer/artist) (2011)
- New Avengers, vol. 2, #9–12 (with Mike Deodato, doing "Avengers 1959" flashbacks) (2011)

=== Other publishers ===
- Creepy #64 (Warren Publishing, 1974)
- Star*Reach #1, 4–5 (1974–76) (Star*Reach)
- The Scorpion #1–2 (writer/artist) (Atlas/Seaboard, 1975)
- Eerie #72 (with Bernie Wrightson) (Warren Publishing, 1976)
- Cody Starbuck, (writer/artist), (Star Reach, 1978)
- American Flagg! #1–12, 14–26, Special #1 (writer/artist); #13, 27–29 (writer) (First, 1983–86)
- Time² (writer/artist) (First, 1986–87)
- Black Kiss (writer/artist) (Vortex, 1988–89)
- Power & Glory, miniseries, #1–4 of 4 (writer/artist) (Malibu/Bravura, 1994)
- Black Kiss II #1–6 (writer/artist) (2012–13, Image Comics)
- Marked Man (2012, Dark Horse Comics originally serialized in Dark Horse Presents #1–8)
- Buck Rogers #1–4 (2013, Hermes Press)
- Dark Horse Presents Volume 2 #22 George Armstrong Custer (writer/artist) (2013)
- Eerie #4 (2013, Dark Horse Comics)
- Satellite Sam (2013–15, Image Comics)
- Black Kiss Christmas Special (writer/artist) (2014, Image Comics)
- The Shadow: Midnight in Moscow #1–6 (2014, Dynamite Entertainment)
- Midnight of the Soul #1–5 (2016, Image Comics)
- The Divided States of Hysteria #1–5 (2017, Image Comics)
- Hey Kids! Comics! #1–5 (2018, Image Comics)

=== Television ===
- The Flash (1990)
  - Episode 3: "Watching the Detectives" (co-written with John Francis Moore)
  - Episode 4: "Honor Among Thieves" (plotted with Moore, teleplay by Danny Bilson and Paul De Meo)
  - Episode 7:"Child's Play" (teleplay co-written with Moore, plot by Stephen Hattman and Gail Morgan Hickman)
  - Episode 8: "Shroud of Death" (plotted with Moore, teleplay by Michael Reaves)
  - Episode 9: "Ghost in the Machine" (co-written with Moore)
  - Episode 12: "The Trickster" (co-written with Moore)
  - Episode 16: "Deadly Nightshade" (co-written with Moore)
  - Episode 19: "Done with Mirrors" (co-written with Moore)
  - Episode 22. "The Trial of the Trickster" (co-written with Moore)
- Mutant X (2001) (Seasons 1 and 2)
  - Season 1:
    - Episodes 1 and 2: "The Shock of the New"
    - Episode 8: "In the Presence of Mine Enemies"
    - Episode 18: "Ex Marks the Spot" (co-written with Mark Amato and David Newman)
    - Episode 22: "A Breed Apart"
  - Season 2:
    - Episode 1: "Past as Prologue"
