= Nick Fury, Agent of S.H.I.E.L.D. =

American comic book series

- Cover of the first issue of the 1968 series, drawn by Jim Steranko

Publication information
- Publisher: Marvel Comics
- Format: Ongoing series
- Publication date: Nick Fury, Agent of S.H.I.E.L.D. (1968): 1968 - 1971; Nick Fury, Agent of S.H.I.E.L.D. (1989): 1989 - 1992
- No. of issues: Nick Fury, Agent of S.H.I.E.L.D. (1968): 18; Nick Fury, Agent of S.H.I.E.L.D. (1989): 47
- Main character: Nick Fury

Nick Fury, Agent of S.H.I.E.L.D. is the title of several American comic book series published by Marvel Comics focusing on the various adventures of the character Nick Fury while working for the fictional organization S.H.I.E.L.D.

== Publication history ==
=== As part of Strange Tales ===
The Nick Fury, Agent of S.H.I.E.L.D. feature replaced then running Human Torch serial that ran alongside Dr Strange in Strange Tales, starting with issue #135. Though Dr Strange was a commercial and critical hit for Marvel, Nick Fury Agent of S.H.I.E.L.D. was given priority and the cover of the anthology book for the first year of the title's serialized run. Both books would eventually alternate covers starting with #146. The early stories introduced the government spy organization S.H.I.E.L.D., which had Nick Fury as its top agent and leader. Early stories had Nick as a plain clothed spy, but the character would ultimately be transitioned into a leather catsuit with white gloves S.H.I.E.L.D. uniform. Many of Nick's fellow Howling Commandos would be established as fellow agents of S.H.I.E.L.D., along with other characters such as the Contessa, who was Nick Fury's primary love interest and second-in-command. The series introduced several different spy groups to the series: Hydra (formed by a businessman's rogue personal assistant), AIM (a mad scientist guild that was originally part of Hydra before splintering off), along with mercenary spies for hire such as the Fixer and Mentallo. Stories would be serialized, lasting several issues each. In Strange Tales #151, the series would undergo a major shift: Stan Lee gave control of the book to Jim Steranko. Steranko's art style would revolutionize the book, drawing critical and commercial acclaim. Furthermore, Steranko would retcon the origin of Hydra as the creation of Sgt Fury recurring villain Baron Wolfgang von Strucker. Strucker would be killed off shortly after appearing in the strip, though the character would be brought back to life in the 1989 Nick Fury series decades later. Ultimately the serial would end with issue #168 and Nick Fury spun off into his own title.

=== Volume 1 ===
In 1968, Strange Tales was canceled and Dr. Strange and Nick Fury spun off into their own books. While Dr. Strange kept the original numbering of Strange Tales, Nick Fury Agent of S.H.I.E.L.D. was re-launched with a new #1. The series would be short-lived; Steranko had issues meeting a monthly deadline for a 20 page book and ultimately left the series after 5 issues, only writing and drawing issues #1-3 and #5. Steranko would continue to provide covers for the book through issue #7. The five issues that Steranko wrote set up a new rival for Nick Fury in the form of "Scorpio"; a foreign assassin/race car driver whose true identity was a mystery to readers and S.H.I.E.L.D. With the departure of Steranko, the sales for the book collapsed and was quickly canceled. The final original issue (#15, November 1969) of the series saw Nick Fury killed by a masked assassin known as "Bulls-eye" (no relations to the Daredevil villain of the same name). Nick Fury would not stay dead for long; two months after the publication of his book's final issue, the character would be revived in Avengers #72 (January 1970). Shortly after Avengers #72 was published, Marvel briefly revived Nick Fury, Agent of S.H.I.E.L.D. as a reprint book for three issues with issues #16-18 would reprise the Nick Fury stories from Strange Tales #136-144. This was continued in the pure reprint book series Nick Fury and His Agents of SHIELD #1-5, reprinting Strange Tales #146-155.

=== Volume 2 ===
As part of their direct market "Special Edition" reprint line, the 4 Jim Steranko issues of volume one (#1-3 and #5) were reprinted in a two part mini-series.

=== Volume 3 ===
During the 1980s, Marvel began promoting a Nick Fury vs. S.H.I.E.L.D. limited series. First announced in 1984 in Marvel Age, the mini-series was referenced in the pages of Incredible Hulk and West Coast Avengers (with it implied in Incredible Hulk that the events were occurring at the same time as Incredible Hulk #299-300). The Nick Fury vs. S.H.I.E.L.D. series was subjected to several years of developmental limbo due to issues over the plot and format in which the limited series would be published. The series ultimately saw publication in 1988, and sold well enough to justify a new ongoing.

Volume three would take place after the events of Nick Fury vs. S.H.I.E.L.D., which Nick Fury rebuilding S.H.I.E.L.D. following the revelation that the agency had been subverted by a renegade group of evolved LMDs. Opposing them was a revived Hydra, who early in the series announce their return by blowing up the main office building Nick Fury's rebuild S.H.I.E.L.D. operated out of; killing several thousand S.H.I.E.L.D. agents. Furthermore, it is revealed that the revived Hydra was being led by a resurrected Baron Von Strucker. The bulk of the series would follow the cat and mouse game between Fury and Strucker, who sought to hide his resurrection from the rest of the world.

=== Volume 4 ===
In 2000 Marvel republished several issues of the 1968 series as a series.

== Collected editions ==
Title	Material collected	Publication date	ISBN
Son of Origins of Marvel Comics	Includes Nick Fury, Agent of S.H.I.E.L.D. story from Strange Tales #135 (Note: This collection contains other material not published under the title Nick Fury, Agent of S.H.I.E.L.D.)	October 1975	978-0-671-22166-9
Marvel Masterworks: Nick Fury, Agent of S.H.I.E.L.D.	Strange Tales #135-153 (Note: This collection contain other material not published under the title Nick Fury, Agent of S.H.I.E.L.D.); Strange Tales #154-168 and Nick Fury, Agent of S.H.I.E.L.D. Volume 1 #1-3 (Note: This collection contain other material not published under the title Nick Fury, Agent of S.H.I.E.L.D.); Nick Fury, Agent of S.H.I.E.L.D. Volume 1 #4-15 (Note: This collection contain other material not published under the title Nick Fury, Agent of S.H.I.E.L.D.)	September 2007; December 2009; December 2011	978-0-7851-2686-7; 978-0-7851-3503-6; 978-0-7851-5034-3
S.H.I.E.L.D.: The Complete Collection Omnibus	Strange Tales #135-168, Nick Fury, Agent of S.H.I.E.L.D. Volume 1 #1-15 (Note: This collection contains other material not published under the title Nick Fury, Agent of S.H.I.E.L.D.)	October 2015	978-0-7851-9852-9
Nick Fury, Agent of S.H.I.E.L.D.	Strange Tales Vol. 1, Issues #150-168	September 2001	978-0785107477
Nick Fury: Who Is Scorpio?	Includes Nick Fury, Agent of S.H.I.E.L.D. Vol. 1, Issues #1-3 & #5	November 2000	978-0785107668
Steranko is Revolutionary!	Strange Tales #135-168, Nick Fury, Agent of S.H.I.E.L.D. Volume 1 #1-3, 5 (Note: This collection contains other material not published under the title Nick Fury, Agent of S.H.I.E.L.D.)	September 2020	ISBN 978-1302922894

== In other media ==
- Nick Fury, Agent of S.H.I.E.L.D., a 1998 TV film starring David Hasselhoff

== See also ==
- 1965 in comics
- 1968 in comics
- 1989 in comics
- 1983 in comics
- 2000 in comics
