= 1970 in comics =

Notable events of 1970 in comics.

== Events and publications ==
=== January ===
- January 5: The first episode of Kim Casali's Love Is... appears in print.
- January 8: In the magazine Pilote, the first episode of the Asterix story Asterix and the Roman agent, by Goscinny and Uderzo is published.
- January 10: The first issue of the British football comics magazine Scorcher is published. In its first issue, Fred Baker and John Gillatt's comic strip Billy's Boots makes its debut.
- January 12: In Charlie Mensuel, the humorous erotic series Paulette, scripted by Georges Wolinski and drawn by Georges Pichard, makes its debut.
- January 13: In Le journal de Tintin, the first chapter of the Ric Hochet story Les Compagnons du Diable by André-Paul Duchâteau and Tibet is published.
- January 15 : In Pilote, the first chapter of Le Spectre aux Balles d'Or by Jean-Michel Charlier and Jean Giraud is published, which closes the Blueberry saga The Gold of the Sierra.
- January 18: Jim Lawrence and Jorge Longaron's Friday Foster makes its debut and will run until 1974.
- January 20: The first episode of Jean-Pol's Kramikske is published in De Volksmacht, where it will run until 1971.
- Detective Comics #395: "The Secret of the Waiting Graves", the first collaboration between Denny O'Neil and Neal Adams. (DC Comics)
- Our Fighting Forces #123 (January/February cover date) (DC Comics)

First appearance of the Losers

- Avengers #72 (Marvel Comics)

First appearance of Zodiac, as well as team members Aquarius, Aries, Cancer, Capricorn, Gemini, Leo, Libra, Pisces, Sagittarius, Taurus, and Virgo

- The Amazing Spider-Man #80: "On the trail of... the Chameleon!" (Marvel Comics)
- Charlton Comics, with issue #18, publishes its final issue of Flash Gordon (1966 series).
- The first issue of the magazine Il Paladino dei Ragazzi (The Boys’ Paladin) is published by the Panini Group.

=== February ===
- February 3 : In Le journal de Tintin, the first chapter of the Michel Vaillant story Rodéo sur 2 Roues by Jean Graton is published.
- February 14: The British comics magazine The Wizard, cancelled in 1963, is relaunched. It will run until 10 June 1978.
- February 15: In Quino's Mafalda the girl Libertad makes her debut.
- February 18: In Le journal de Tintin, the first episode of the Ric Hochet story Cauchemar pour Ric Hochet, by André-Paul Duchâteau and Tibet, is published.
- February 21: first issue of Provolino (Edizioni Bianconi), by Alberico Motta and Pier Luigi Sangalli.
- February 26: The first episode of François Walthéry's Natacha is published in Spirou.
- In the Italian magazine Horror, first strip of Zio Boris, by Alfredo Castelli and Carlo Peroni.
- The Alan Ford story Il Numero Uno, by Max Bunker and Magnus is the debut of Number One, the boss of the TNT group.

=== March ===
- March 2: James Childress' Conchy is first published. It will until 1977.
- March 21: The first San Diego Comic-Con is organized. A few months later it will be held again as a three-day event.
- March 24: Frans Piët officially retires and passes Sjors en Sjimmie on to his successor Jan Kruis.
- March 26: Berck's Sammy makes his debut.
- Teen Titans #26 (March/April cover date) (DC Comics)

First appearance of Mal Duncan, DC Comics' first black superhero.

=== April ===
- April 5: In Topolino, the first chapter of the Donald Duck story Storia e gloria della dinastia dei paperi (History and Glory of the Ducks Dynasty) is published, a saga in 8 episodes by Guido Martina, Romano Scarpa and Giovan Battista Carpi, telling the story of the Duck family from the Ancien Egypt to the Apollo 11 mission.
- April 5: In Il Giornalino, the story Adios Gringo, by Claudio Nizzi and Carlo Boscarato marks the debut of Larry Yuma (here still called Dave).
- April 15: The first issue of the underground comix magazine Slow Death is published. The first issue was copyrighted by the "Visual Yoyo Tribe," a Berkeley-based collective of which Turner was a member.
- April 19: Russell Myers' newspaper gag comic Broom-Hilda makes its debut.
- April 19: In Il giornalino, the story Il Ladro di Uranio (The Uranium Thief), by Gianluigi Gonano and Gianni De Luca marks the debut of Commissario Spada.
- April 30: The Marvel super-heroes get officially Italy with the first issue of L’uomo ragno (translation of Spider-Man, Editoriale Corno); however, some Fantastic Four stories had been already published in Linus.
- Green Lantern #76, Dennis O'Neil and Neal Adams became the creative team and rechristen the title as Green Lantern/Green Arrow. This begins a long story arc in which the characters undertook a social-commentary journey across America.
- Ron Turner founds Last Gasp in San Francisco.
- The first issue of the Italian magazine Psyco (Editrice Naka), dedicated to the horror and the science fiction comics, often in parody key. Also if very short lived (only 6 issues), it hosts classics as the dramatic serie Van Helsing, detective del soprannaturale (Van Helsing, supernatural detective) by Alfredo Castelli and Carlo Peroni and the parody Storie dello spazio profondo (Stories from deep space) by Bonvi and Francesco Guccini.
- In the French magazine Pif Comics, Le Secret de Tristam Bantam, by Hugo Pratt, the first chapter of Under the sign of Capricorn is published, a cycle of Corto Maltese’s adventures set in South America.

=== May ===
- The British underground magazine Oz releases a special issue, Schoolkids Oz, made by high school pupils. The issue features a pornographic parody of the children's comic Rupert Bear made by a 16-year old pupil named Vivian Berger. The issue and particularly this specific comic will lead to a highly mediatized trial, accusing the publishers of Oz of obscenity.

=== June ===
- June 6: The first issue of the British comics magazine Cor!! is published. In its first issue Reg Parlett's Ivor Lott and Tony Broke makes its debut.
- June 17: The first episode of Ted Shearer's Quincy is published.
- June 22: In Charles M. Schulz' Peanuts the little bird Woodstock receives his name.
- Detective Comics #400: "Challenge of the Man-Bat", by Frank Robbins, Neal Adams, and Dick Giordano. (DC Comics)

First appearance of the Man-Bat.

- The final episode of Gerard Wiegel's Professor Cumulus runs in De Volkskrant.

=== Summer ===
- John Bagley founds Company & Sons in San Francisco.

=== July ===
- July 9:
  - In Pilote, the first chapter of the Asterix story the Asterix in Switzerland, by Goscinny and Uderzo is published.
  - In Spirou, the first chapter of the Spirou et Fantasio story Du Glucose pour Noémie by Jean-Claude Fournier is published.
- July 12: In Il giornalino, Il colonnello Casterbum contro Piccolo Dente, by Claudio Nizzi and Lino Landolfi, marks the debut of the redskin kid Piccolo Dente (Little Tooth).
- July 19: In Tiramolla, Cattivik, by Bonvi, makes his debut.
- July 25: The final episode of R.B. Clark's Boofhead is published.
- Fantastic Four #100: "The Long Journey Home", by Stan Lee, Jack Kirby, and Joe Sinnott. (Marvel Comics).
- The one-shot feminist comics magazine It Ain't Me Babe is published.
- The first issue of the British adult comics magazine Cyclops is published. It will run for only three months.
- The first and only issue of It Ain't Me, Babe is published, a one-shot underground comic realized only by women.
- First issue of Il Topolino d’oro (Golden Micky Mouse, Mondadori), reprint of the classic Mickey Mouse stories by Floyd Gottfredson.

=== August ===
- August 1–3:
  - The first three-day San Diego Comic-Con is held. Five months earlier a first event was organized but just for one day.
  - After the death of David Law, Gordon Bell filled in for that week's episode of Dennis the Menace and Gnasher in The Beano. David Sutherland now steps in to continue the series. He will draw it up until 1988.
- August 4: In Le journal de Tintin, the first chapter of the Ric Hochet story Ric Hochet contre le Bourreau by André-Paul Duchâteau and Tibet is published.
- August 20: In Pilote, the first chapter of the Lucky Luke story Canyon Apache, by Goscinny and Morris is published.

=== September ===
- September 10: In Pilote, the first chapter of the Blueberry story Chihuahua Pearl by Jean Michel Charlier and Jean Giraud is published. This is the start of the Blueberry story “Saga of the Confederate gold”.
- September 24: Roger Leloup's Yoko Tsuno makes its debut.
- Denis Kitchen founds Krupp Comic Works (more commonly known as Kitchen Sink Press) in Princeton, Wisconsin.
- The Flash #200: "Count 200 — and Die", by Robert Kanigher, Irv Novick, and Murphy Anderson. (DC Comics)
- Showcase (1956 series), with issue #93, is cancelled by DC Comics.
- Fantastic Four #102: After 102 consecutive issues written by Stan Lee and drawn by Jack Kirby, Kirby's final issue as Fantastic Four artist (and his temporary departure from Marvel Comics).
- Silver Surfer, with issue #18, cancelled by Marvel.
- In Italy, the first issue of Jolanka (Furio Viano editore) is published, an erotic comic with a sensual pirate woman as a protagonist. The next month, Ediperiodici too launches an analogues character (Jolanda de Almaviva)

=== October ===
- October 8: In Pilote, the first chapter of the Valerian and Laureline story World Without Stars, by Pierre Christin and Jean-Claude Mézières is published.
- October 26:
  - Garry Trudeau's long-running satirical newspaper comic Doonesbury is first published.
  - The first episode of Mell Lazarus' Momma is published.
- October 29 : The last issue of Il Vittorioso (since 1967 changed in Vitt) appears on the market. Il Giornalino replaces it as main Italian Catholic magazine for children.
- October 30: Kees Kousemaker and his wife Evelien publish Strip voor Strip, the first standard Dutch-language book about comics.
- Jack Kirby, with issue #133, debuts as writer/artist on Superman's Pal Jimmy Olsen, introducing the concepts and characters of his Fourth World epic. In his first issue alone, Kirby creates the characters Morgan Edge and Intergang, as well as Project Cadmus, a fictional government genetic engineering project.
- The first issue of Young Lust is published and will run until 1993.
- In Italy, the first issue of Hessa (ErreGi), drawn by Nevio Zeccara, is published. It becomes controversial for its large amount of sex and violence and ambiguous attitude towards Nazism.

=== November ===
- November 16: The French satirical comics magazine Hara-Kiri mocks the death of President Charles de Gaulle on its cover. This leads to its third and definitive ban within one decade. To thwart the ban, the publication changes its name to Charlie Hebdo.
- November 17: in Le journal de Tintin, the first chapter of the Michel Vaillant story Massacre Pour Un Moteur by Jean Graton is published.
- November 23: The first issue of the French satirical comics magazine Charlie Hebdo is published.
- Robert M. Overstreet publishes the first edition of his Overstreet Comic Book Price Guide, soon to become the primary authority on the subject of American comic book grading and pricing.
- In Midi Linus, first episode of the fantarcheology series Agharti, by Eric Sciò.

=== December ===
- December 12: Jan Kruis' Jan, Jans en de Kinderen (Jack, Jacky and the Juniors) makes its debut.
- Adventure Comics #400: 35th anniversary issue, "Return of the Black Flame!", by Mike Sekowsky.
- Challengers of the Unknown (1958 series), with issue #77 (December 1970/January 1971 cover date), is canceled by DC Comics.
- Metal Men (1963 series), with issue #41 (December 1970/January 1971 cover date), is canceled by DC.

== Births ==
=== January ===
- January 22: Alex Ross, American comic book artist and writer (Kingdom Come, Batman, Superman).

=== April ===
- April 1: Brad Meltzer, American writer (Identity Crisis, Green Arrow, Justice League).

== Deaths ==
=== January ===
- January 16: Dave Breger, American comics artist (Private Breger, aka G.I. Joe), dies at age 69.
- January 17: Norman E. Jennett, American illustrator and comics artist (The Monkey Shines of Marseleen), dies at age 92.
- Specific date unknown: Munson Paddock, aka Pad, American comics artist (Mr. Bluff, The Wisdom of Wiseheimer, Little Miss Thoughtful, Naughty Ned, Angelic Angelina, worked for DC Comics, Harvey Comics, Fawcett Comics), dies at age 86.

=== February ===
- 2 February: William Donahey, American comics artist and children's book illustrator (The Teenie Weenies), dies at age 87.
- 11 February: Lee W. Stanley, American comics artist (The Old Home Town), dies at age 84.
- 13 February: H.M. Bateman, Australian-British comics artist and cartoonist, dies at age 83.
- 18 February: Jim Holdaway, British comics artist (Romeo Brown, Modesty Blaise), dies at age 42 from a heart attack.

=== March ===
- March: Lloyd Jacquet, American comics publisher (Funnies, Inc.), dies at age 71.
- 18 March: Jacobus Grosman, Dutch comics artist (Gijsje Goochem), dies at age 62.

=== April ===
- April 17: Rudolf Petersson, Swedish comics artist (91:an), dies at age 73.
- April 30: Sam Milai, African-American cartoonist (Pittsburgh Courier, Don Powers), dies at age 62

=== May ===
- May 3: Ken Kling, American comics artist (Hank and Pete, Buzz and Snooze, Katinka, Those Folks, Joe & Asbestos, Windy Riley, assisted on Mutt and Jeff), dies at age 74.
- May 19: Martin Branner, American comics artist (Winnie Winkle, Perry and the Rinkey-Dinks), dies at age 81.
- May 21: R.B. Clark, Australian comics artist (Boofhead), dies at age 59 or 60.
- May 30: Heinz Ludwig, German comics artist (Mecki), dies at age 63.

=== June ===
- June 5: Jay Irving, American comics artist (Pottsy), dies at age 69 from a heart attack.
- June 6: Victor E. Pazmiño aka VEP, Ecuadorian-American comics artist (drew comics for Famous Funnies), dies at age 70.
- June 13: Hubuc, Belgian comics artist (Victor Sébastopol, Alertogas), dies from leukemia at age 42.
- June 15: José Sobral De Almada Negreiros, Portuguese comics artist (O Velho, o Rapaz e o Burro, Os Dois Irmãos Muito Unidos, O Sonho do Pechalin), dies at age 67.

=== July ===
- July 9: Elov Persson, Swedish comics artist (Kronblom, Agust och Lotta), dies at age 75.
- July 11: George Wilson, American illustrator and comics artist (made comics for Fiction House, Centaur Comics and Ace Magazines), dies at age 67.
- July 24: James McIsaac, Canadian caricaturist, illustrator and comics artist (Contes Historiques, Catholic text comics), dies at age 81.
- Specific date unknown: Harry Kuwada, American cartoonist (Pete 'n' Zeke, Alec), dies at age 46.

=== August ===
- August 2: Lank Leonard, American comics artist (Mickey Finn), dies at age 74.
- August 13: Dan Gordon, American comics artist, animator, animation director and animation writer (Superkatt), dies in a house fire at age 68.
- August 28: Bud Neill, Scottish comics artist (Lobey Dosser), dies at age 58.

=== September ===
- September 11: Pál Pusztai, Hungarian graphic artist and illustrator (Jucika, Iván és Joe), dies at age 51.
- September 17: Cyril Gwyn Price, Welsh comics artist (PC Penny, Martha, Tricky Dicky), dies at age 65.
- September 25: Erich Maria Remarque, German novelist and comic writer (Der Contibuben), dies at age 72.

=== October ===
- October 24: Job Denijs, Dutch designer, architect, advertising illustrator and comics artist (Pietjes Wonderbare Reizen), dies at age 77.

=== November ===
- November 6: John Giunta, American comics artist (Cisco Kid, assistant to Frank Frazetta), dies at age 50.
- November 10: Cal Alley, American comics artist (The Ryatts), dies at age 55 from cancer.
- November 24: Eeli Jaatinen, Finnish illustrator and comics artist, dies at age 64.
- Specific date unknown: Bob Barnes, American comics artist (The Better Half), dies at age 66 or 67.

=== December ===
- December 7: Rube Goldberg, American comics artist and cartoonist (Mike and Ike (They Look Alike), Boob McNutt), dies at age 87.
- December 9: Harrison Cady, American illustrator and comics artist (Peter Rabbit), dies at age 93.
- December 14: Malcolm Kildale, American illustrator and comics artist, dies at age 57.
- December 17: Walt Scott, American comics artist (The Little People, The Magic Egg, The Little Blue Duck, The Animals' Christmas, assisted Captain Easy), dies at age 76.
- December 30: Clifford David Vormelker, American comics writer (wrote the script for a 1937 comic strip adaptation of A Christmas Carol, illustrated by Alfred J. Buescher, and the 1938 comic Dickens The Chimes - A New Year's Fantasy, illustrated by William Sherb), dies at age 64.

=== Specific date unknown ===
- R.B. Clark, Australian comics artist (Boofhead), dies at age 59 or 60.
- John Henry Crosman, American painter, illustrator and comics artist (comics of novels for King Features' Book-of-the-Month Club), dies at age 72 or 73.
- Helen Jacobs, British illustrator and comics artist, dies at age 89 or 90.
- Raquel Roque Gameiro, Portuguese illustrator and comics artist, dies at age 81.
- Julius Macon, German cartoonist, caricaturist and illustrator, dies at age 86 or 87.
- Dick Wood, American comics writer and short stories writer (wrote for The Claw, Crime Does Not Pay, Little Dynamite, Batman & Robin, Green Arrow, Tomahawk, Our Army At War, House of Mystery, Airboy, Spyman, Mandrake the Magician, The Phantom,...), dies at age 50 or 51.

== Exhibitions ==
- December 31, 1970 – February 7, 1971: AAARGH!: a Celebration of Comics, Institute of Contemporary Arts, London

== Conventions ==
- Comicon '70 (British Comic Art Convention) (Rutland Hotel, Sheffield, England) — organized by Sam Plumb
- Disneyland Hotel Comicon (Anaheim, California) — one and only event of its kind
- March 21: Golden State Comic-Minicon (U.S. Grant Hotel, San Diego, California) — Shel Dorf organizes a one-day convention "as a kind of 'dry run' for the larger convention he hope[s] to stage." Official guests: Forrest J. Ackerman, Mike Royer
- June 19–21: Southwesterncon V / Multicon 70 (Skirvan Hotel, Oklahoma City, Oklahoma) — first iteration of this show; guest speaker: Reed Crandall
- July 3–5: Metro Comic Art Convention (Statler Hilton Hotel, New York City)
- August: Metro Con (Statler Hotel, Springfield, Virginia) — first annual show organized by 15-year-old Gary Groth; attendees include Michael Kaluta and Bernie Wrightson (guests of honor), Neal Adams (keynote speaker), and Sal Buscema
- August 1–3: Golden State Comic-Con (U.S. Grant Hotel, San Diego) — Dorf's first three-day San Diego comics convention, it draws 300 people. Official guests: Forrest J. Ackerman, Ray Bradbury, Jack Kirby, Bob Stevens, A. E. van Vogt
- August 23–24: Toronto Triple Fan Fair a.k.a. "Fan Fair 2" (King Edward Hotel, Toronto, ON, Canada) — Guests of Honour: Isaac Asimov and Anne McCaffrey; 450 attendees
- September 5–7: Detroit Triple Fan Fair (Howard Johnson New Center Motor Lodge, Detroit, Michigan) — Program dedicated to Jack Kirby. Western-themed cover by Jim Steranko and interior art pages by Neal Adams and Bernie Wrightson.
- October 31–November 2: Salone Internazionale dei Comics a.k.a. "Lucca 6" (Lucca, Italy)
- November 27–29: Phoenix Con (Scottsdale Ramada Inn, Scottsdale, Arizona) — first iteration of the show, produced by Bruce Hamilton; attendees include Don Newton and John Barrett

== Awards ==
=== Goethe Awards ===
Published in a 1971 issue of Maggie Thompson's fanzine Newfangles for comics published in 1970.

- Favorite Pro Artist: Neal Adams
- Favorite Pro Writer: tie
  - Denny O'Neil
  - Roy Thomas
- Favorite Pro Editor: Dick Giordano
- Favorite Pro Comic Book: Green Lantern/Green Arrow
- Favorite Underground Comic: Captain George Presents
- Favorite Comic-Book Story: "No Evil Shall Escape My Sight" by Denny O'Neil/Neal Adams in Green Lantern/Green Arrow #76 (DC)
- Favorite Comic-Book Character: Deadman (DC)
- Favorite Fanzine: Newfangles
- Favorite Fan Writer: Jan Strnad
- Favorite Fan Artist: Robert Kline

=== Shazam Awards ===
Presented in 1971 for comics published in 1970: (Award presentation: May 12, 1971, at the Statler Hilton Hotel's Terrace Ballroom.)

- Best Story: "No Evil Shall Escape My Sight", by Dennis O'Neil and Neal Adams, Green Lantern/Green Arrow #76 (DC Comics)
- Best Continuing Feature: Green Lantern/Green Arrow (DC Comics)
- Best Drama Writer: Dennis O'Neil
- Best Drama Penciller: Neal Adams
- Best Drama Inker: Dick Giordano
- Best Letterer: Sam Rosen
- Best Colorist: Jack Adler
- Best Humor Penciller: Bob Oksner
- Best Humor Inker: Henry Scarpelli
- Best Humor Writer: Carl Barks, The Junior Woodchucks (Gold Key Comics)
- Best New Talent: Barry Smith
- Outstanding Achievement by an Individual: Jim Steranko, for The Steranko History of Comics
- Best Foreign Title: Legionarios del Espacio (writer-artist Esteban Maroto, Spain)
- Special Recognition Outside the Field: Nostalgia Press (for comic strip reprints)
- Hall of Fame: Jerry Siegel and Joe Shuster
- Special Plaque: Stan Lee ("for forming ACBA")

== First issue by title ==
=== DC Comics ===
All-Star Western vol. 2

Release: September. Editor: Dick Giordano.

=== Marvel Comics ===
Amazing Adventures vol. 2

Release: August. Editor: Stan Lee.

Astonishing Tales

Release: August. Editor: Stan Lee.

Conan the Barbarian

Release: October. Writer: Roy Thomas. Artist: Barry Smith and Dan Adkins.

Fear

Release: November. Editor: Stan Lee.

Ka-Zar

Release: January. Editor: Stan Lee.

Outlaw Kid (second series)

Release: August. Editor: Stan Lee.

Where Monsters Dwell

Release: August. Editor: Stan Lee.

Western Gunfighters (second series)

Release: August. Editor: Stan Lee.

=== Independent titles ===
Hulk: The Manga

Release: by Weekly Bokura Magazine. Writer: Kazuo Koike. Artists: Yoshihiro Moritou and Kosei Saigou.

It Ain't Me, Babe

Release: July by Last Gasp. Editors: Trina Robbins and Barbara "Willy" Mendes.

Oriental Heroes

Release: by Jade Dynasty. Writer/Artist: Wong Yuk Long.

San Francisco Comic Book

Release: January by San Francisco Comic Book Company. Publisher: Gary Arlington

Slow Death Funnies

Release: April by Last Gasp. Editor/Publisher: Ron Turner

Spider-Man: The Manga

Release: by Monthly Shōnen Magazine. Writer/Artist: Ryoichi Ikegami.

Young Lust

Release: October by Company & Sons. Editors: Bill Griffith and Jay Kinney

== Initial appearance by character name ==
=== DC Comics ===
- Appa Ali Apsa, in Green Lantern #76 (April)
- Lilith Clay, in Teen Titans #25 (February)
- Darkseid, in Superman's Pal Jimmy Olsen #134 (November)
- Doctor Darrk, in Detective Comics #406 (December)
- El Diablo, in All-Star Western #02 (October)
- Mal Duncan, in Teen Titans #26 (April)
- Morgan Edge, in Superman's Pal Jimmy Olsen #133 (October)
- Intergang, in Superman's Pal Jimmy Olsen #133 (October)
- Losers, in Our Fighting Forces #123 (January/February)
- Man-Bat, in Detective Comics #400 (June)
- Rose and Thorn in Superman's Girl Friend, Lois Lane #105
- Francine Langstrom, in Detective Comics #400 (June)
- Ten-Eyed Man, in Batman #226 (November)

=== Marvel Comics ===
- Arkon, in Avengers #76 (April)
- Firebrand, in Iron Man #27 (July)
- Richard Fisk, in The Amazing Spider-Man #83 (April)
- Freak (Eddie March), in Iron Man #21 (January)
- Garokk, in Astonishing Tales #2 (November)
- Guardsman, in Iron Man #31 (November)
- Kangaroo, in The Amazing Spider-Man #81 (February)
- Llyra, in Sub-Mariner #32 (December)
- Starr the Slayer, in Chamber of Darkness #4 (April)
- Sunfire, in X-Men #64 (January)
- Valkyrie (Brunnhilde), in The Avengers #83 (December)
- Jim Wilson, in The Incredible Hulk #131 (September)
- Zodiac, in Avengers #72 (January)
  - Aquarius
  - Aries
  - Cancer
  - Capricorn
  - Gemini
  - Leo
  - Libra
  - Pisces
  - Sagittarius
  - Taurus
  - Virgo

=== Independent titles ===
- Cattivik, in Tiramolla (19 July)
