= List of Marvel Anime episodes =

The Marvel Comics logo used since 2012. Variations of this logo had been used for the titles of each anime series.

The following is an episode list for Marvel Anime, a four-part series of anime shows as part of a collaboration between Marvel Entertainment and Madhouse. The four series are based on Iron Man, Wolverine, X-Men and Blade. These series had their debut in Japan on Animax, and aired in North America on G4 and in Australia on Sci Fi. The first series, Iron Man aired in Japan between October 1, 2010, and December 17, 2010. The second series, Wolverine, aired in Japan between January 7, 2011, and March 25, 2011. Both series aired in English on G4 between July 23, 2011, and October 14, 2011. The third series, X-Men, aired in Japan between April 1, 2011, and June 24, 2011, and aired in English on G4 from October 21, 2011, to January 6, 2012. The fourth and final series, Blade, aired in Japan between July 1, 2011, and September 16, 2011, and aired in English on G4 from January 13, 2012, to April 2, 2012.

== Iron Man ==
| No. | Title | Original release date | English airdate |
|---|---|---|---|
| 1 | "Japan: Enter Iron Man" (Iron Man Arrives in Japan); Transliteration: "Aian Man, Rainichi" (Japanese: アイアンマン、来日) | 1 October 2010 | 23 July 2011 |
In Japan, Tony Stark supervises the construction of an Arc Station and, planning to retire as Iron Man, readies the Iron Man Dio armor for a successor. However, the prototype's test flight fails and the test pilot becomes brainwashed during targeting practice, attacking his colleagues. After diagnosis reveals the Dio suit was hacked by an outside source, Tony reactivates his classic Iron Man armor and neutralizes it, then battles and defeats Scorpio - a warrior of the Zodiac order. Afterwards, Tony finds the Dio suit missing.
| 2 | "Going Nuclear" (Find the Missing Nuke); Transliteration: "Kieta Kaku o Oe" (Japanese: 消えた核を追え) | 8 October 2010 | 5 August 2011 |
When Tony is accused of smuggling a stolen shipment of plutonium, Iron Man investigates the ship it was carried on and runs into another Zodiac warrior, Cancer. With chaotic driving and Sakurai's help, Tony races to get the plutonium from the true culprits, which ends up in Nanami's possession. Saving Nanami, Iron Man battles Cancer once again and destroys him. Tony is cleared of his charges and Nanami writes a news report to put Tony in a positive light.
| 3 | "Reap the Whirlwind" (The Reviving Project); Transliteration: "Yomigaeru Purojekuto" (Japanese: 蘇るプロジェクト) | 15 October 2010 | 12 August 2011 |
A series of strange tornadoes kills Professor Ohno and Satoshi Yamaguchi. While diverting another tornado, Iron Man discovers their source is the Zodiac robot Aries. Professor Michelinie reveals the weather manipulation Tesla Project, but another Tornado comes for him as Tony helps reluctant rescue workers save the lives of a mother and daughter. Michelinie turns out to be the one that hacked the project and collaborated with Zodiac to get it online, shortly before the mad professor gets himself sucked up in a tornado. Using the newly developed EMP Cannon, Iron Man makes a risky fight and destroys Aries, stopping the weather disasters.
| 4 | "A Twist of Memory, a Turn of the Mind" (Reunion); Transliteration: "Saikai" (Japanese: 再会) | 22 October 2010 | 19 August 2011 |
Tony recalls his past five years ago where, after a test of his new Screamer jet, he was kept in captivity by terrorists led by Righella and met Ho Yinsen. Showing Tony the error of his apathetic ways, Yinsen helped him build the prototype Iron Man suit and sacrificed himself to allow Tony to escape. Meanwhile, a vengeful Kawashima symbiotically merges with the Zodiac machine Taurus to try and eliminate Tony. Wolverine collaborates with Iron Man to destroy Taurus and rescue Kawashima, after which Iron Man faces the Dio suit again - discovering it is piloted by none other than Yinsen.
| 5 | "Outbreak" (Arc Station, Infection); Transliteration: "Āku Sutēshon, Kansen" (Japanese: アークステーション, 感染) | 29 October 2010 | 26 August 2011 |
A strange infection that turns victims' bodily fluids blue has arisen, with Tony's in-progress Arc Station suspected to be the cause. Meanwhile, the JSDF satellites have been compromised and Sakurai implores Tony's help, in which they discover SAT-1 to be the source of the illness. Using Dr. Tanaka's prototype technology and a ride from Sakurai, Iron Man gets to SAT-1 and finds the Zodiac robot Aquarius using the satellite to induce the sickness through radiation, which he engages and destroys.
| 6 | "Technical Difficulties" (Cyber Battlefront); Transliteration: "Dennō Sensen" (Japanese: 電脳戦線) | 5 November 2010 | 2 September 2011 |
A Zodiac computer virus controlled by Pisces causes the robots in the Arc Station to become mavericks while the air conditioner is set to a deep-freezing temperature. Tony repels the virus with a firewall, which causes it to go berserk and make electronics across the city go haywire. Iron Man lures the virus into his own operating systems and eventually he fights the virus in cyberspace - during which the virus' misguided master, Sho, has a change of heart and sets things right. As Iron Man is attacked by two Cancer robots, he is faced by the new Ramon Zero armor.
| 7 | "At the Mercy of My Friends" (Escape); Transliteration: "Dasshutsu" (Japanese: 脱出) | 12 November 2010 | 9 September 2011 |
The Ramon Zero saves Tony from the Cancer robots. That night Tony and Dr. Tanka are kidnapped by Zodiac operatives and taken to a remote island, with Tony missing the arc reactor for his life-support. Yinsen emerges and offers Tony to create weapons for Zodiac, which Tony turns down before unsuccessfully attempting to escape via a makeshift transceiver and a motorboat. Eventually, using an improvised rocket launcher, Tony signals a flare for rescue. Yinsen returns Tony his arc reactor, while Ramon Zero - revealed to be piloted by Sakurai - destroys a Scorpio robot.
| 8 | "Daughter of the Zodiac" (Girl); Transliteration: "Shōjo" (Japanese: 少女) | 19 November 2010 | 16 September 2011 |
Tony encounters a telekinetic girl named Aki, who apparently escaped from Zodiac and seeks Tony's protection, but Aki's stay with Tony escalates into chaos. Tony later makes up with Aki, but Sakurai takes her into custody shortly before a Zodiac robot, Virgo, attacks them. Aki's brainwaves make Virgo impervious to Iron Man's attacks. Aki saves Iron Man but becomes merges with Virgo, causing a destructive magnetic field to build up. Iron Man eventually saves Aki while Dr. Tanka destroys Virgo, though Aki's memory of Tony and Zodiac is erased.
| 9 | "A Duel of Iron" (VS Iron Man); Transliteration: "Bāsasu Aian Man" (Japanese: VSアイアンマン) | 26 November 2010 | 23 September 2011 |
Yinsen recalls when a lady named Shehla saved him from death at Righella's hideout after his sacrifice to save Tony, making him one of the family until a terrorist attack wiped them all out, his grief and rage leading to his corruption by Zodiac. Yinsen steals a container of plutonium alongside the Zodiac robot Sagittarius, and Iron Man tries to track of him down. During a duel, Yinsen sends an Iron Man Sigma to destroy the Arc Station, while Iron Man fruitlessly negotiates with him and is eventually defeated due to holding back on his old friend. Yinsen steals the Iron Man armor, throws Tony into an underground river and takes over the Arc Station.
| 10 | "Casualties of War" (Iron Will); Transliteration: "Kōtetsu no Isshi" (Japanese: 鋼鉄の意志) | 3 December 2010 | 30 September 2011 |
Yinsen holds everyone in the Arc Reactor hostage for the prime minister Kuroda to meet his demands, claiming to have killed Tony. However, Sakurai manages to rescue Tony and head over to the Arc Reactor, avoiding Sagittarius, while Nanami recovers Tony's armor and brings it to him. Iron Man destroys Sagittarius, then proceeds to battle Yinsen once more. However, Zodiac orders the Iron Man Sigma units to kill Yinsen after deeming him no longer useful, resulting in them destroying each-other. With his dying words, Yinsin admits he was wrong to Tony and urges the latter not to abuse Iron Man's power as he did.
| 11 | "The Beginning of the End" (Mastermind); Transliteration: "Kuromaku" (Japanese: 黒幕) | 10 December 2010 | 7 October 2011 |
The JSDF holds Tony in custody due to rumors of his involvement with Zodiac, but Sakurai has other plans for Tony. As the Arc Reactor enters a meltdown buildup, Zodiac takes over the military base and destroys the parliament centre. Iron Man fights and wards off a Zodiac robot, while Sakurai locates the Zodiac command centre under Tokyo Bay - where he discovers its leader to be Kuroda, now armed in his Rasetsu armor with intent to destroy and rebuild Japan. Sakurai fights Kuroda but is killed, though he manages to notify Tony of Kuroda's treachery.
| 12 | "Endgame" (The Light in the Distance); Transliteration: "Eien no Hikari" (Japanese: 永遠の光) | 17 December 2010 | 14 October 2011 |
Kuroda enacts a coup d'etat and declares martial law over Japan. As Dr. Tanaka confesses to unwittingly overloading the Arc Reactor, Kuroda destroys the US military presence and reveals that Tanaka is really the Zodiac robot Tony fought before, Gemini. Iron Man is able to snap Tanaka out of her frenzy, but finds her fatally wounded by her own weapons. Iron Man fights and struggles against Kuroda's heavily-armed Rasetsu, but Tanaka uses the last of her strength to provide Iron Man the power he needs to vanquish Kuroda. Months later, Tony completes his work on the Arc Station to provide renewable energy for the world, remembering Tanaka's sacrifice as he departs for home.

== Wolverine ==
| No. | Title | Original release date | English airdate |
|---|---|---|---|
| 1 | "Mariko"; Transliteration: "Mariko" (Japanese: 真理子～MARIKO) | 7 January 2011 | 23 July 2011 |
Logan saves Tesshin Asano from a group of A.I.M. troops. Asano tells Logan about the whereabouts of his non-mutant girlfriend and sweetheart Mariko Yashida, who was taken by her own father's, Shingen, crime organisation Kuzuryu one year ago in order to arrange a marriage with Hideki Kurohagi to expand his operations. Logan flies to Tokyo and infiltrates the Yashida household, only to be confronted by Shingen. Logan faces Shingen in a duel, but is drugged by Hideki.
| 2 | "Yukio"; Transliteration: "Yukio" (Japanese: 雪緒～YUKIO) | 14 January 2011 | 5 August 2011 |
Logan is defeated and dumped on a railroad track. Asano follows to save Logan, but finds Hideki's men killed and Logan gone. An assassin named Yukio has revived Logan and teams up with him. They find that Asano was murdered, but are assumed the killers by the police. After fighting their way out, Logan and Yukio are faced by the strongest and most lethal assassins: Kikyo Mikage.
| 3 | "Kikyo"; Transliteration: "Kikyō" (Japanese: 桔梗～KIKYO) | 21 January 2011 | 12 August 2011 |
Logan and Kikyo are engaged in a fierce fight. Logan concludes Kikyo was Asano's killer, while police squads surround the area, but Logan and Yukio make their escape. Hoping to disrupt Shingen's operations, Logan and Yukio stop a shipment Hideki is collecting. However, the cargo is revealed to be Logan's nemesis Omega Red.
| 4 | "Omega Red"; Transliteration: "Omega Reddo" (Japanese: 極赤～OMEGA RED) | 28 January 2011 | 19 August 2011 |
Logan's fight with Omega Red takes its toll on him regardless of his healing factor, reminiscing him mission from S.H.I.E.L.D. to steal Carbonadium and his previous encounter against Omega Red throughout. Hideki and his men get away while Agent Tsukino seizes the evidence that can help expose Shingen. Logan thwarts an assassination attempt, but Omega Red returns and has Logan pinned down.
| 5 | "Asano"; Transliteration: "Asano" (Japanese: 浅野～ASANO) | 4 February 2011 | 26 August 2011 |
Logan helped by Yukio cripples Omega Red, who is later retrieved by A.I.M. for treatment. Logan goes to the Yashida household, but is challenged by Kikyo to another fight. Their fight is interrupted by Omega Red, whom Logan quickly defeats. It is revealed that Shingen has taken Markio to Madripoor where the agents have no jurisdiction. After the fight, the X-Men's Blackbird de-cloaks with Cyclops piloting it.
| 6 | "Min" (Girl); Transliteration: "Min" (Japanese: 少女～MIN) | 11 February 2011 | 2 September 2011 |
Cyclops drops Logan and Yukio off at Madripoor. Separated from Yukio by pirates, Logan treks across the island while he is repeatedly attacked by criminal gangs and outlaws. A girl named Min kills several men with Kunais to help him. Then after Logan questions her, they ultimately team up. Hideki sends out the giant statue Vadhaka to kill Logan.
| 7 | "Vadhaka" (Statue); Transliteration: "Vadaka" (Japanese: 像～VADHAKA) | 18 February 2011 | 9 September 2011 |
Logan and Min are on the run from the Vadhaka statue. Yukio comes to their rescue, then Min blinds Vadhaka. Down in the sewers, Min's allies led by Master Koh offer assistance to Logan, allowing Master Koh and his people to liberate Madripoor. After Koh briefs Logan on his origins and past, a transmission informs them that Yukio has been captured by Hideki's men and she will be killed if Logan does not surrender.
| 8 | "Koh"; Transliteration: "Kō" (Japanese: 黄～KOH) | 25 February 2011 | 16 September 2011 |
Logan intends to rescue Yukio and Koh provides him the information he'll need for his mission on the Dragon Palace later. Yukio own's attempt to escape fails, but Logan gets past the automated defenses and releases her. Together, they take the dangerous path called "Hell Road" to get to Hideki.
| 9 | "Hell Road"; Transliteration: "Heru Rōdo" (Japanese: 獄道～HELL ROAD) | 4 March 2011 | 23 September 2011 |
At first, Hell Road is quiet, but Logan and Yukio drive through spear-trapped sections. Soon, they're forced to continue their course on foot, getting briefly stopped by a pit trap and a gang of swordsmen. While Logan and Yukio get past more dangerous traps and rivalry gang wars break out, Hideki decides to start his wedding with Mariko earlier and Master Koh's army advances through Hell Road. At the Dragon Palace entrance, Logan is faced with Kikyo once again.
| 10 | "Shingen"; Transliteration: "Shingen" (Japanese: 信玄～SHINGEN) | 11 March 2011 | 30 September 2011 |
Kikyo allows Logan to delay their duel due to his code of honour. Hideki sends an upgraded Vadhaka against Logan. Despite a severe crushing against Vadhaka's foot, Logan manages to overthrow Vadhaka and himself against the walls. As Hideki's men fire on Koh's army, Kikyo upholds his honour and disarms them, then he helps Logan to destroy Vadhaka after Min is killed in the crossfire.
| 11 | "Kurohagi"; Transliteration: "Kurohagi" (Japanese: 黒萩～KUROHAGI) | 18 March 2011 | 7 October 2011 |
Logan, Yukio and Kikyo break into Dragon Palace, with Koh's forces aiding. Koh however goes to face Shingen by himself, but Yukio intervenes, though Koh sacrifices his life for Yukio. With Koh's forces overrunning the place and Logan about to crash the wedding, Hideki holds Mariko at gunpoint. As Hideki takes an unconscious Mariko away, Logan prepares to battle Shingen once again.
| 12 | "Logan"; Transliteration: "Rōgan" (Japanese: 狼眼～LOGAN) | 25 March 2011 | 14 October 2011 |
Logan sustains nasty wounds as he fights Shingen. Kikyo prevents Hideki from using a powerful poison dart gun on Logan, then helps a wounded Yukio. Hideki takes Mariko to the catacombs and reveals it was he himself that killed his father to take over, then sets the building to self-destruct. After much fighting, Logan and Yukio finally slaughter Shingen, Yukio confessing to killing Asumo before she dies. Logan pursues Hideki, then he endures a poison dart but manages to use it against Hideki. However Mariko has been hit by a stray bullet, but they share a final, romantic kiss before she dies. In the post-credits, Logan and Kikyo start the battle that they had postponed.

== X-Men ==
| No. | Title | Original release date | English airdate |
|---|---|---|---|
| 1 | "The Return - Joining Forces"; Transliteration: "The Return - Shūketsu" (Japanese: The Return - 集結) | 1 April 2011 | 21 October 2011 |
Since the tragic self-demise of Jean Grey one year ago (who had been fully possessed by the almighty Dark Phoenix entity), the X-Men have disbanded and the Xavier Institute has closed. Professor X requests Storm, Wolverine and Beast, who are eventually re-joined by Cyclops, to fly to the Tōhoku region of Japan to investigate the sudden disappearance of Hisako Ichiki.
| 2 | "U-Men - Mutant Hunting"; Transliteration: "U-Men - Myūtanto Gari" (Japanese: U-Men - ミュータント探り) | 8 April 2011 | 28 October 2011 |
The X-Men learn that in Tōhoku, the U-Men have been kidnapping mutants in order to harvest their organs to create countermeasures against mutant-kind. They find themselves attacked by the U-Men's robots, but are able to destroy them. At an abandoned hospital, they find a mutant boy, who transforms into a monster and Cyclops reluctantly kills him to save his friends. They manage to locate the laboratory where Hisako is being kept along with Emma Frost, a woman who Cyclops remembers was psioncally present with Jean during his battle with the Dark Phoenix.
| 3 | "Armor - Awakening"; Transliteration: "Armor - Kakusei" (Japanese: Armor - 覚醒) | 15 April 2011 | 4 November 2011 |
Emma has denied any involvement in the battle with the Dark Phoenix, but she briefs them about her resignation from the Inner Circle and her part in helping Hisako further develop her ability. The X-Men battle a group of cyborgs all the while being analyzed for data. In the Organ Storage, the X-Men confront Kick. Hisako's mutant powers awaken and she erects a powerful psionic armor around herself, defeating Kick, while Emma Frost mentally helps with her self-control. After liberating the other mutant children, Emma defends Hisako from Kick.
| 4 | "Transformation - Secondary Mutation"; Transliteration: "Transformation - Niji Henshitsu" (Japanese: Transformation - 二次変質) | 22 April 2011 | 11 November 2011 |
Emma's secondary mutation of turning solid diamond activates to block Kick's attacks, then the X-Men kill him and Hisako is reunited with her family, but later travels with Emma and the X-Men. En route to New York, they are attacked by a mutant from U-Men's lab who suffers the same condition as Emma. Once at Beast's lab, the boy shortly dies, revealed to have been caused by the 'Damon-Hall Syndrome'. Emma however is in no danger at all. Xavier suspects something is still going on in Tōhoku which is causing these mutations.
| 5 | "Power - Unity"; Transliteration: "Power - Kessoku" (Japanese: Power - 結束) | 6 May 2011 | 18 November 2011 |
Cyclops disapproves of Emma being made an official X-Man. After a fierce simulated battle between Cyclops and Hisako, Emma sees Hisako's lack of self-confidence. Emma clears the matter by allowing Xavier to scan her mind and reveal her past to the team, including her affiliation and resignation of the Inner Circle, thus Cyclops ceases his distrust for Emma and welcomes her as a friend. As the X-Men prepare to leave for Tōhoku with the DHS vaccines, Emma questions Xavier about a woman named Yui Sasaki which she saw when their minds were linked.
| 6 | "Conflict - Contested"; Transliteration: "Conflict - Gekisen" (Japanese: Conflict-激戦) | 13 May 2011 | 25 November 2011 |
Once the X-Men arrive back in Tōhoku, Beast administers the vaccine to several infected mutants, while the others investigate strange occurrences in the area. On a flight to the dead zone, the Blackbird is shot down and buried by living snow. The X-Men are crippled by Sublime in robotic armor, until Beast finds a weak point, allowing the others to defeat him. After the X-Men discover a Mutant Detector, Sublime self-destructs. Caught in the middle of a blizzard, the X-Men are forced to take shelter in a lodge resided by Yui Sasaki, former headmistress of her own academy when Hisako was younger.
| 7 | "Betrayal - Shock"; Transliteration: "Betrayal - Shōgeki" (Japanese: Betrayal-衝撃) | 20 May 2011 | 2 December 2011 |
As the X-Men talk to Yui, Emma suspects she may be lying about her relation to Xavier. The X-Men also meet Yui's research assistants Riko Nirasaki, Kōichi Kaga, and Jun Sanada. Yui later contacts Xavier, revealing he has a young son named Takeo that had died. As Wolverine, Storm and Beast investigate the phenomenon which ensnared their Blackbird, they are confronted by Inner Circle agents Rat and Marsh. After a brief battle, they escape upon setting off an avalanche. As Hisako goes to find Yui concerning some irritation on her right hand, Emma asks to dive into Cyclops' mind in order to quell his enduring sorrow and find closure for losing Jean. Meanwhile, Yui is attacked.
| 8 | "Lost - Signs"; Transliteration: "Lost - Yochō" (Japanese: Lost-予兆) | 27 May 2011 | 9 December 2011 |
The X-Men rush to Yui's aid, as she is attacked by a spider-like monster. Upon defeating the monster, they are shocked to discover that it turns back to Riko Nirasaki who was afflicted by DHS. Beast vaccinates Riko while questioning Yui. Kaga transforms into a monster due to DHS and attacks the X-Men, but is defeated. Emma catches a glace of Jun Sanada and sees his image flicker to that of Mastermind and he vanishes. After Kaga is vaccinated, Cyclops and Wolverine confront her about their discovery of a secret medication she had supplied Riko and Kaga. Xavier flies the backup Blackbird to Tōhoku, reflecting on his and Yui's past romance, but suddenly finds himself and the ship trapped in a void over Tōhoku.
| 9 | "Revelations - From Behind the Scenes"; Transliteration: "Revelations - An'yakusha" (Japanese: Revelations-暗躍者) | 3 June 2011 | 16 December 2011 |
Yui reveals that the medication is experimental and designed to suppress mutant powers from awakening, but has instead become a viral mutagen. Emma follows Jun deep in the laboratory and confronts him as his true persona: Mastermind, leader of the Inner Circle, who used the U-Men as part of the plan and framed Emma for "causing" Jean's demise. The two fight, then Marsh intervenes, but the X-Men arrive and save Emma. Using an illusion of Jean, Mastermind affects Wolverine into attacking his own team, but Cyclops snaps him out of it. Emma manages to expose Mastermind. While the X-Men confront the Inner Circle members, Xavier battles an immensely strong psionic opponent in the void.
| 10 | "Countdown - Truth"; Transliteration: "Countdown - Shinjitsu" (Japanese: Countdown-真実) | 10 June 2011 | 23 December 2011 |
The X-Men battle the Inner Circle, defeating Rat. They discover a machine for tracking mutants, similar to Cerebro and an addition a room where Yui is containing her and Xavier's son Takeo who is an unusually strong telepath/empath with an uncontrollable power to warp reality, which Mastermind intends to use to conquer humanity. Yui hired the U-Men to obtain extracted mutant tissue in order to do her research in the hopes of improving Takeo's condition. The Inner Circle's White Bishop Neuron kills Riko and Kōichi. Mastermind awakens Takeo while Marsh and Neuron entrap the X-Men. Meanwhile, Xavier manages to escape the void.
| 11 | "Revenge - End"; Transliteration: "Revenge - Shūmatsu" (Japanese: Revenge-終末) | 17 June 2011 | 30 December 2011 |
Hisako recalls that Takeo was once her childhood friend, who caused a tragic accident. As Mastermind manipulates Takeo, Hisako breaks free and overpowers Marsh helping Cyclops kill him, while Beast overpowers Neuron and Wolverine kills him. Mastermind puts Cyclops in a nightmarish illusionary battle against the Dark Phoenix. A vision of Jean Grey comes to Cyclops' aid and Cyclops is able to break free from Mastermind's trance. Takeo turns against Mastermind and kills him, then begins to become unstable enough to destroy the Earth. Xavier arrives to confront Takeo.
| 12 | "Destiny - Bond"; Transliteration: "Destiny - Kizuna" (Japanese: Destiny-絆) | 24 June 2011 | 6 January 2012 |
Xavier contacts the world's population to support each other (mutants and heroes included). Takeo is impervious to the X-Men's attacks. Xavier has a difficult time getting through to Takeo who hates Xavier for his miserable existence and they mentally battle one another. Reflecting on being Takeo's one and only good friend, Hisako manages to get through to Takeo and coax him, stabilizing him and allowing him to peacefully die and a new age of peace around the world begins. In a post-credit scene, it is revealed that Magneto's plastic prison has been destroyed and he has escaped.

== Blade ==
| No. | Title | Original release date | English airdate |
|---|---|---|---|
| 1 | "The Man, Blade" (His Name is Blade); Transliteration: "Sono Otoko, Bureido" (Japanese: その男、ブレイド) | 1 July 2011 | 13 January 2012 |
While recapping his history, Blade seeks the vampire who killed his mother. Makoto and Hayate rampage the vampire Club Feed, Blade joining in and slaying the werewolf Ladu. The vampire leader Deacon Frost infects Hayate and Blade realises he is the one he's looking for. Blade kills Hayate and Makoto swears revenge for that.
| 2 | "Mad World" (A Night for the Living, A Mourning for the Dead); Transliteration: "Kurutta Sekai" (Japanese: 狂った世界) | 8 July 2011 | 20 January 2012 |
Illegal migrant women have gone missing. Detective Sakomizu investigates a Yakazu hideout, where Blade gets Sakomizu to take him to Police HQ. Blade interrogates the corrupt Chief Gondou. In the subway, Blade and Sakomizu find Tanaka, who has been running a blood farm using the kidnapped women. Sakomizu with help from Makoto fights off Tanaka's vampire cats and frees the women, while Blade battles Tanaka revealing himself to be a Water Tiger Monster and manages to kill him. Everyone is able to escape from the place as Tanaka's self destruction bomb explodes. Blade continues his pursuit for Deacon Frost.
| 3 | "Vampire Hunter" (Dead on Arrival); Transliteration: "Vanpaia Hantā" (Japanese: ヴァンパイア・ハンター) | 15 July 2011 | 27 January 2012 |
Blade accompanied by Noah van Helsing and his dog Razor, board a ship run by Captain McRay, Makoto hitching a ride and plotting to kill Blade. After sustaining Blade with a Retrovirus injection, Noah explains to Makoto how found, raised and helped Blade. The ship is attacked by Mandurugos. Makoto puts her vengeance aside to save Blade from the Mandrurugo leader Matthes. Blade defeats Matthes by injecting the Retrovirus into her. The Mandrurugos flee, taking Matthes' body with them as well as Noah.
| 4 | "Childhood Days" (That Was Then, This Is Now); Transliteration: "Shōnen no Jibi" (Japanese: 少年の日々) | 22 July 2011 | 3 February 2012 |
In the Philippines, Blade recalls as a child, he was raised by a big family, then his vampire mother Tara took it all away from him. During a slave trade, Makoto rescues Noah, while Blade kills the Mandurugos and their leader Matthes. Blade along with Makoto and Razor continue to follow Frost's trail.
| 5 | "Island Lights" (The Island of Fire); Transliteration: "Hikaru Shima" (Japanese: 光る島) | 29 July 2011 | 10 February 2012 |
As Blade, Makoto and Razor infiltrate Siquijor Island, Lucius Issac issues Frost a warning against his activities. Blade runs into Verdugo natives, who are hunting for the Manananggal. After attacking the base, Blade fights Frost only to get defeated and a sample of blood extracted from him. The Manananggal comes and attacks the Verdugo. With the aid of the Verdugo and their spiritual powers, Blade slays the Manananggal.
| 6 | "The Magic Medicine Man" (Bad Blood); Transliteration: "Mahōi no Otoko" (Japanese: 魔法医の男) | 5 August 2011 | 17 February 2012 |
A vampire bat tells Blade he can find Frost in Sumatra. There Frost is mining silver with a slave labor. The shaman Agus seeks Blade's help to cure the local women turned into Sundel bolongs. Blade is skeptical and attacks the silver mine the next day. Agus is killed by his infected wife, proven wrong about the cure, uses sacred water to destroy all the Sundel bolongs. Blade heads into the mine and battles Rat-Man vampire called Saragi to death. Blade takes some sacred water before resuming his hunt for Frost.
| 7 | "Day Walker and Mutant" (Claws and Blades); Transliteration: "Dei Uōkā to Myūtanto" (Japanese: デイ・ウォーカーとミュータント) | 12 August 2011 | 24 February 2012 |
Blade and Mokoto arrive at the unpleasant island of Madripoor. Wolverine teams up with them. The Viper Gang leader Djalal unleashes an army Polong and his men on Blade, while Lucius Isaac destroys the silver ammunition plant and wounds Djalal. Blade, Wolverine and Djalal manage to kill Isaac, then Djalal dies. After that Wolverine goes his separate way to find A.I.M.
| 8 | "Eternal Apocalypse" (Old Wounds, Fresh Blood); Transliteration: "Eien no Mokushiroku" (Japanese: 永遠の黙示録) | 19 August 2011 | 5 March 2012 |
The Vampire High Council plot to get rid of both Blade and Frost. In Vietnam, during an ambush with Vampire Ninjas, Blade is met by a Marine Veteran, Stan Davis, the last of the Vampire Super Soldier unit. Stan turns down Kikyo's offer to join Frost, so Kikyo kills him. Blade then starts a duel with Kikyo.
| 9 | "Teacher's and Student's Bonds" (The Bond); Transliteration: "Shitei no Kizuna" (Japanese: 師弟の絆) | 26 August 2011 | 12 March 2012 |
Blade and Kikyo reminisce their sword fight training with Master Tanba while they duel. Tanba arrives only now as a vampire, having been forcefully infected by Deacon Frost while he suffered lung cancer. Blade learns the final sword technique Chaotic Moon and kills Tamba. Frost arrives and captures Blade.
| 10 | "To the Vortex of Sorrows" (Sins of the Father); Transliteration: "Dōkoku no Uzu e" (Japanese: 慟哭の渦へ) | 2 September 2011 | 19 March 2012 |
In Cambodia, Frost has Blade imprisoned to analyse his sunlight tolerance. Frost briefs Blade on his past tragedy of losing his dedicated son Edgar to a vampire and police did not lift a finger to help. Frost did genetic experiments until he turned himself into a dominant vampire. Makoto and Razor infiltrate the lab, but as Makoto finds Blade, Frost comes up behind her.
| 11 | "Partner" (The Last Sunset); Transliteration: "Aibō" (Japanese: 相棒) | 9 September 2011 | 26 March 2012 |
Frost bites Makoto, making Blade give Frost the adrenaline he needs. As Makoto puts up a fight, Noah storms in and destroys the lab. Frost escapes with the blood samples. Blade puts Makoto out of her misery before her infection takes over. In the vampire city of Armarot, the High Council battles Frost and his army of hybrid vampires, Blade turning up later. Meanwhile some of Frost's forces overwhelm the High Council's headquarters.
| 12 | "The Other Side of Darkness" (The Final Glory of Deacon Frost); Transliteration: "Yami no Mukōgawa" (Japanese: 闇の向こう側) | 16 September 2011 | 2 April 2012 |
Kikyo joins Blade's battle in Armarot battling a seven-headed vampire worm, while Noah blows up the Frost's arsenal and uses sacred water to destroy Armarot's power core, which wipes out the vampire forces. Blade fights Frost's daylight vampire mutants, as Frost is mutating himself with Blade's blood. Blade slays the mutant vampires and Frost mutates into a powerful vampire. Blade endures many wounds, but with effort kills Frost for good. In the post-credits, Blade is in London where he saves a woman from the vampires that are followers of the Darkhold.
