= Sagittarius (comics) =

Sagittarius is the name of several characters appearing in American comic books published by Marvel Comics.

== Publication history ==
The original Sagittarius first appeared in Avengers #72 (January 1970), and was created by Roy Thomas and Sal Buscema.

== Fictional character biography ==
=== Harlan Vargas ===
Sagittarius

Publication information
- Publisher: Marvel Comics
- First appearance: Avengers #72 (Jan 1970)
- Created by: Roy Thomas and Sal Buscema

In-story information
- Alter ego: Harlan Vargas
- Team affiliations: Zodiac

Harlan Vargas is a founding member of Zodiac, based in Washington, D.C. Zodiac was founded by Cornelius van Lunt (Taurus), handpicking the eleven other members; van Lunt concealed his own identity, while he was the only one who knew the identities of the others.

Led by Taurus, Zodiac attempts to kill all Manhattan residents born under the sign of Gemini as a show of power, but are thwarted by the Avengers. Taurus's faction attempts to kill the Zodiac dissident faction, but is captured by the Avengers.

A new android version of Zodiac later appears, led by Scorpio in a new android body. This group kills the human members of Zodiac and takes over their criminal operations.

=== Life Model Decoy ===
Sagittarius is a Life Model Decoy (LMD) created by Scorpio (Jacob Fury) to be part of his Zodiac crime organization. The androids Libra and Sagittarius employ costumed criminals posing as the Defenders to create chaos in New York City. The Zodiac LMD's are recruited by Quicksilver, who Quicksilver orders the Zodiac LMD's to destroy the Avengers for their perceived wrongdoings. The Avengers defeat Zodiac, whose members are remanded into federal custody.

After Zodiac escapes prison, Scorpio uses the Zodiac Key to create LMDs that exemplify the forces and personalities inherent in each sign, hoping to create great strength in the combination of all twelve traits of the Zodiac. He arranges the ambush in which the android Zodiac kills all of the remaining human Zodiac leaders except Taurus. It was later revealed that Libra had also survived the attack on the original Zodiac group.

=== Second Life Model Decoy ===
This Sagittarius was created by Scorpio after the first Sagittarius LMD was destroyed by Hawkeye in a battle with the West Coast Avengers. This version of Sagittarius, was created to look exactly like Hawkeye to infiltrate the West Coast Avengers compound.

It was soon discovered by Mockingbird and, with the help of the Leo LMD created to appear exactly as Tigra also to infiltrate the West Coast Avengers, destroyed.

=== Ecliptic Sagittarius ===
Ecliptic Sagittarius is one of the first recruits in the latest incarnation of Zodiac. Recruited by their leader Scorpio, Sagittarius was a bow-wielding centaur and has demonstrated a tendency towards violent acts, for which he apparently feels no remorse. He apparently had a relationship with fellow member Pisces. Sagittarius was apparently killed by Weapon X.

=== Thanos' Sagittarius ===
The fifth Sagittarius is an unnamed man who Thanos recruited to join his incarnation of Zodiac. He and the other Zodiac members are killed when Thanos abandons them on the self-destructing Helicarrier, with Cancer being the only survivor.

== Powers and abilities ==
Sagittarius has no powers. However, he is skilled at hand-to-hand combat.

The android Sagittarius is equipped with special wrist-launchers which can fire arrows at its opponents, including flame-arrows. In its second form, Sagittarius was constructed to resemble Hawkeye. It carries a bow and arrows similar to Hawkeye.

Ecliptic's Sagittarius had a bow that shot armor-piercing arrows. He sometimes carries a gun and has a Zodiac teleportation device.

== In other media ==
- Sagittarius appears in The Avengers: United They Stand. This version is a cyborg, centaur-like alien and member of Zodiac.
- Sagittarius appears in Marvel Anime: Iron Man. This version is a centaur-like mech utilized by Zodiac.
