= Virgo (character) =

Virgo is the name of several fictional characters appearing in American comic books published by Marvel Comics.

== Publication history ==
The original Virgo first appeared in Avengers #72 (January 1970), and was created by Roy Thomas and Sal Buscema. The character subsequently appears in Avengers #120-123 (February–May 1974), Ghost Rider #7 (August 1974), Iron Man #184 (July 1984), and West Coast Avengers #26 (November 1987), in which she is killed. Virgo appeared as part of the "Zodiac" entry in the Official Handbook of the Marvel Universe Deluxe Edition #20.

== Fictional character biography ==
=== Elaine McLaughlin ===
Virgo

Publication information
- Publisher: Marvel Comics
- First appearance: Avengers #72 (Jan 1970)
- Created by: Roy Thomas and Sal Buscema

In-story information
- Alter ego: Elaine McLaughlin
- Species: Human
- Team affiliations: Zodiac
- Abilities: Hand-to-hand combat

Elaine McLaughlin is a criminal mastermind and founding member of Zodiac. Led by Taurus, Zodiac attempts to kill all Manhattan residents born under the sign of Gemini as a show of power, but are thwarted by the Avengers.

A new android version of Zodiac later appeared, led by Scorpio in a new android body. This group massacred the human Zodiac, and took over their criminal operations. In "The War of the Realms" storyline, Virgo is revealed to have survived.

=== LMD version ===
Virgo

Publication information
- Publisher: Marvel Comics
- First appearance: Defenders #50 (August 1977)

In-story information
- Species: Life Model Decoy
- Team affiliations: Zodiac
- Notable aliases: Elaine McLaughlin
- Abilities: Energy-siphoning

Virgo is a Life Model Decoy created by Scorpio (Jacob Fury) to be part of Zodiac. However, Virgo proved to be impossible to activate, in essence, being "still-born." Scorpio is so distraught over the loss of the Virgo LMD that he seemingly commits suicide.

Scorpio survives and creates a new Virgo. During their battle with the Avengers, Virgo incapacitates Iron Man, but is defeated by Tigra and taken into custody along with the rest of the Zodiac LMDs. Virgo arranges the ambush in which the android Zodiac killed all of the remaining human Zodiac leaders except Taurus.

The Zodiac Key immediately resurrects Scorpio. Claiming superiority and believing that Zodiac would eventually kill the Avengers as the androids could never be stopped, Scorpio intends to use the Key to transport everyone present to the Key's native dimension, where the conflict could be prolonged indefinitely. However, once the androids are in the other dimension, they cease to function without energy to sustain them.

=== Ecliptic version ===
Virgo

Publication information
- Publisher: Marvel Comics
- First appearance: Alpha Flight vol. 2 #1

In-story information
- Team affiliations: Zodiac
- Abilities: Skilled marksman

Ecliptic Virgo is one of the first recruits in the latest incarnation of Zodiac. She was quiet and loyal to Scorpio, who was in love with her. She came to like Paris during her time stranded there without her teleportation device, but it is unknown if it was she or Taurus who killed her "rescuers." Virgo was apparently killed by Weapon X.

=== Thanos' Virgo ===
The fourth Virgo is an unnamed female who Thanos recruited to join his Zodiac. She and the other Zodiac members are killed when Thanos abandons them on the self-destructing Helicarrier, with Cancer being the only survivor.

== Powers and abilities ==
The original Virgo was skilled in hand-to-hand combat.

The android Virgo employed an energy-siphoning device that she used on more than one occasion to shut down Iron Man's armor. Virgo was programmed after the Virgo sign. She was also particularly fond of money, seducing men, and relying upon proven tactics instead of taking risks.

Ecliptic's Virgo has no superpowers. She wields a variety of guns and bows and she is a skilled marksman.

The fourth Virgo wears a special suit that gives her wings and a fiery head.

== In other media ==
- Virgo makes non-speaking appearances in The Avengers: United They Stand. This version is an alien with psychic powers and a member of Zodiac.
- Virgo appears in the Marvel Anime: Iron Man episode "Daughter of the Zodiac". This version is a flying robotic head utilized by Zodiac,
