= Leo (comics) =

Leo is the name of several characters appearing in American comic books published by Marvel Comics.

== Publication history ==
The original Leo first appeared in The Avengers #72 (Jan. 1970), and was created by Roy Thomas and Sal Buscema.

The character subsequently appears in The Avengers #120-123 (Feb.–May 1974), Ghost Rider #7 (Aug. 1974), Iron Man #184 (July 1984), and The West Coast Avengers vol. 2 #26 (Nov. 1987), in which he is killed.

Leo appeared as part of the "Zodiac" entry in The Official Handbook of the Marvel Universe Deluxe Edition #20.

== Fictional character biography ==
=== Daniel Radford ===
Leo

Publication information
- Publisher: Marvel Comics
- First appearance: The Avengers #72 (Jan. 1970)
- Created by: Roy Thomas and Sal Buscema

In-story information
- Alter ego: Daniel Radford
- Team affiliations: Zodiac

Daniel Radford is a founding member of Zodiac, an organization founded by Cornelius van Lunt (Taurus). Van Lunt handpicked Radford and ten others to join Zodiac, concealing his own identity from them. Each member is based in a different American city as part of van Lunt's criminal network, with Radford being based in Los Angeles.

Led by Taurus, Zodiac attempts to kill all Manhattan residents born under the sign of Gemini as a show of power, but are thwarted by the Avengers. Taurus's faction attempts to kill Zodiac dissident faction, but all twelve leaders are captured by the Avengers. A new incarnation of Zodiac, led by Scorpio, kills the original members of Zodiac and takes over their criminal operations.

=== Android Leo ===
The second Leo is a Life Model Decoy (LMD) created by Scorpio (Jacob Fury) to be part of his Zodiac crime organization. Scorpio attacks his brother, Nick Fury, with his new group, but is defeated by the Defenders and Moon Knight. The Zodiac LMDs are recruited by Quicksilver during his bout with temporary insanity, and Quicksilver orders the Zodiac LMDs to destroy the Avengers for their imagined wrongdoings. The Avengers manage to defeat the group and most of them are taken into custody.

Claiming superiority and believing that Zodiac would eventually kill the Avengers as the androids could never be stopped, Scorpio intends to use the Zodiac Key to transport everyone on the scene to the Key's native dimension, where the conflict could be prolonged indefinitely. When the Zodiac LMDs are transported to the other dimension, they run out of energy and cease to function.

=== Female android Leo ===
The third Leo is an LMD who was created to resemble Tigra and infiltrate the West Coast Avengers alongside the second LMD of Sagittarius, who resembles Hawkeye. The Sagittarius LMD is discovered by Mockingbird, who along with the help of this LMD version of Leo, is destroyed. Leo takes part in destroying Sagittarius to maintain her cover. Leo is later transported to the Ankh dimension along with the other members of Zodiac, where she dies after running out of energy.

=== Ecliptic Leo ===
Leo is a later addition to Zodiac who resembled a humanoid lion. As mean, nasty, and brutal as the other Zodiac man-animals, Leo was also a boastful braggart, openly talking of the group’s plans. He accompanies Capricorn and Aries in the theft of Department H's super-organism. Leo is later killed with the rest of Zodiac by Weapon X.

=== Thanos' Leo ===
The fifth Leo is an unnamed man who Thanos recruited to join his incarnation of Zodiac. During a fight with Hulk, Leo dies of a heart attack. Iron Man subsequently uses Leo's suit to devise a way to shut down the special suits of the other Zodiac members.

== Powers and abilities ==
Leo wore a lion-skin costume equipped with claws on his costume's "paws" as weapons.

The Android Leo has super human strength, agility, endurance, a set of razor sharp claws, enhanced hearing and vision.

The female Android Leo had the same abilities as Tigra.

The Ecliptic Leo possessed superhuman strength, besides using claws and fangs. He wielded a gun and a Zodiac teleportation device.

The fifth Leo is an unnamed man who wears a special suit that enables him to assume the form of a humanoid lion.

== In other media ==
- Leo appears in The Avengers: United They Stand. This version is a lion-like alien and member of Zodiac.
- Leo-inspired foot soldiers appear in Ultimate Spider-Man as members of Zodiac.
