= Gemini (Marvel Comics) =

Gemini is the name of several fictional characters appearing in American comic books published by Marvel Comics.

== Publication history ==
The original Gemini first appeared in The Avengers #72 (Jan. 1970), and was created by Roy Thomas and Sal Buscema.

The character subsequently appears in The Avengers #80-82 (Sept.–Nov. 1970), Daredevil #69 (Oct. 1970), Iron Man #33-36 (Jan.–April 1971), Daredevil #73 (Feb. 1971), Astonishing Tales #8 (Oct. 1971), #15-20 (Dec. 1972-Oct. 1973), The Avengers #120-125 (Feb.–July 1974), #130-134 (Dec. 1974-April 1975), Giant-Size Avengers #3-4 (Feb., June 1975), Iron Man #184-185 (July–Aug. 1984), and The West Coast Avengers vol. 2 #26 (Nov. 1987), in which he is killed.

Gemini appeared as part of the "Zodiac" entry in the Official Handbook of the Marvel Universe Deluxe Edition #20.

== Fictional character biography ==
=== Joshua Link ===
Gemini

Publication information
- Publisher: Marvel Comics
- First appearance: The Avengers #72 (Jan. 1970)
- Created by: Roy Thomas; Sal Buscema

In-story information
- Alter ego: Joshua Link
- Species: Human mutate
- Team affiliations: Zodiac
- Abilities: Superhuman strength Energy blasts/beams Mind/mental manipulation

Joshua Link fell in with a bad crowd in school, becoming more wild and progressing to criminal activities and theft. Eventually, his father threw him out and told him to never come back. Working with the criminals Monk and Brackett, Joshua is transporting some stolen materials out of Futura Research Laboratory when they are confronted by officers Jeff Hanley and Damian Link, Joshua's brother. In the ensuing struggle, Joshua and Damian are knocked into a metal chamber and bombarded by "experimental rays", until Brackett deactivates the device. The criminals drag Joshua away, leaving Damian for dead. 48 hours later, Brackett and the others decide to kill Joshua to prevent being linked to the crimes via their association with him. Damian takes out the other criminals before turning Joshua over to the police.

Joshua is recruited into Zodiac by Cornelius van Lunt (Taurus), who hand picked him and the eleven other members. Each member is based in a different American city as part of Taurus's criminal network, with the goal of economic and political domination.

A new android version of the Zodiac later appeared, led by Scorpio in a new android body, massacred the human Zodiac, and took over their criminal operations.

=== Android Zodiac ===
The second Gemini is an android created by Scorpio as part of the second Zodiac. Led by Scorpio, the android Zodiac massacre the human Zodiac and take over their criminal operations. They battle the West Coast Avengers, but are rendered inert after being transported to the dimension of the Brotherhood of the Ankh.

=== Ecliptic Gemini ===
The Gemini that worked for Ecliptic is actually two people. One of the Geminis is Madison Jeffries, who was brainwashed into serving Zodiac. The two Geminis spoke as one when they are together.

=== Thanos' Gemini ===
The fourth Gemini is an unnamed man who Thanos recruited to join his incarnation of Zodiac. He and the other Zodiac members are killed when Thanos abandons them on a self-destructing Helicarrier, with Cancer being the only survivor.

== Powers and abilities ==
Due to an electrical accident, Link became psionically linked with his twin brother Damian, a policeman. Hence, Joshua Link can take mental control of Damian Link's mind and body and can add Damian's physical strength to that of his own body.

The android Gemini possessed multiple personalities representing the Zodiac sign that it was based on. Gemini can also release two clones of itself with one being white (the reason personality which can fire energy blasts) and one being black (the emotion personality which can release jolts of electricity by touch). Gemini later gained the ability to expand its form where it grows in size and gains super-strength. In its second form, Gemini can fly and release blasts of energy. Gemini in this form also exhibited a talkative personality.

The Ecliptic Gemini that served as Madison Jeffries' "twin" did not demonstrate any powers.

== In other media ==
- Gemini appears in The Avengers: United They Stand, voiced by Nigel Hamer (male head) and Julie Lemieux (female head). This version is a two-headed, four-armed alien and a member of Zodiac.
- Gemini appears in Marvel Anime: Iron Man, voiced by Takako Honda in the original Japanese version and by Laura Bailey in the English dub. This version is Dr. Chika Tanaka, a sleeper agent for Zodiac who was brainwashed into serving them and wears a powered suit of armor as Gemini.
