= Libra (Marvel Comics) =

Libra is the name of several fictional characters appearing in American comic books published by Marvel Comics.

== Publication history ==
The original Libra first appeared in Avengers #72 (Jan. 1970), and was created by Roy Thomas and Sal Buscema.

The character subsequently appears in:

- The Avengers #80–82 (Sept.–Nov. 1970),
- Daredevil #69 (Oct. 1970),
- Iron Man #33–36 (Jan.–April 1971),
- Daredevil #73 (Feb. 1971),
- The Avengers #120–125 (Feb.–July 1974), #130–134 (Dec. 1974–April 1975),
- Giant-Size Avengers #3 (Feb. 1975),
- The Avengers #135 (May 1975),
- Giant-Size Avengers #4 (June 1975),
- Iron Man #184–185 (July–Aug. 1984),
- The West Coast Avengers vol. 2 #26 (Nov. 1987),
- Avengers Forever #1–12 (Dec. 1998–Feb. 2000).

Libra appeared as part of the "Zodiac" entry in The Official Handbook of the Marvel Universe Deluxe Edition #20.

== Fictional character biography ==
=== Gustav Brandt ===
Libra

Publication information
- Publisher: Marvel Comics
- First appearance: The Avengers #72 (Jan. 1970)
- Created by: Roy Thomas; Sal Buscema

In-story information
- Alter ego: Gustav Brandt
- Team affiliations: Zodiac; The Avengers
- Notable aliases: Master of the Balance, Lloyd Willoughby
- Abilities: Psychic senses Skilled martial artist Teleportation ability to shift into the Place Between.

German soldier Gustav Brandt served with the French forces during the Vietnam War. While in Saigon, he met and fell in love with a Vietnamese woman named Lua, and eventually had a daughter with her. However, Lua's brother Khruul was enraged with the interracial coupling of his sister and a European man. He and his men attacked Gustav and his family, killing Lua and blinding Gustav. Gustav and his daughter took shelter in Pama, where he was trained by priests, but was forbidden to communicate with his daughter.

Joining Zodiac, Gustav adopts the codename Libra. Led by Taurus, Zodiac attempts to kill all Manhattan residents born under the sign of Gemini as a show of power, but they are thwarted by the Avengers. Taurus's faction attempted to kill the Zodiac dissident faction, but all twelve leaders were captured by the Avengers. Battling the Avengers on several occasions, he eventually discovered that Avengers member Mantis is his daughter and surrenders.

After most of Zodiac's members are killed by the second Zodiac group, Libra briefly works with the Avengers as they battle Kang the Conqueror and Immortus in the Destiny War. His ability to sense the 'balance' of the universe helps Rick Jones use the Destiny Force to summon seven Avengers from different points in the team's history to aid them.

=== Android Zodiac ===
The second Libra is part of a group of androids created by Scorpio (Jake Fury). The androids Libra and Sagittarius employ costumed criminals posing as the Defenders to create chaos in New York City. Quicksilver employs the android Zodiac to attack the West Coast Avengers, but the Avengers defeat Zodiac.

Led by Scorpio in a new android body, the android Zodiac kills the human Zodiac and takes their criminal operations. They battle the West Coast Avengers, but are rendered inert after being transported to the dimension of the Brotherhood of the Ankh.

=== Thanos' Libra ===
The third Libra is an unnamed female and member of Thanos' incarnation of Zodiac. She and the other Zodiac members are killed when Thanos abandons them on a self-destructing Helicarrier, with Cancer being the only survivor.

== Powers and abilities ==
Libra is physically blind, but possesses psychic senses, and is also a skilled martial artist. He can transport himself to the Place Between Places, a mystical dimension that is untraceable to most life-forms.

The Android Libra can fly and become intangible.

Ecliptic's Libra wields a staff and an energy-charged sword. It is unknown if she possesses other abilities, but she possesses the Zodiac teleportation device.

== In other media ==
Libra makes non-speaking appearances in The Avengers: United They Stand. This version is an alien and member of Zodiac who wields a balance scale-like weapon.
