= Pisces (character) =

Pisces is the name of several fictional characters appearing in American comic books published by Marvel Comics.

== Publication history ==
The original Pisces first appeared in Avengers #72 (January 1970), and was created by Roy Thomas and Sal Buscema.

The character subsequently appears in Avengers #120-123 (February–May 1974), Ghost Rider #7 (August 1974), Iron Man #184 (July 1984), and West Coast Avengers #26 (November 1987), in which he is killed.

Pisces appeared as part of the "Zodiac" entry in the Official Handbook of the Marvel Universe Deluxe Edition #20.

== Fictional character biography ==
=== Noah Perricone ===
Pisces

Publication information
- Publisher: Marvel Comics
- First appearance: Avengers #72 (Jan 1970)
- Created by: Roy Thomas and Sal Buscema

In-story information
- Alter ego: Noah Perricone
- Team affiliations: Zodiac

Noah Perricone is a founding Zodiac member, and his base of operations was Miami, Florida. The Zodiac cartel was founded by Cornelius van Lunt (Taurus), who handpicked the eleven other members. Van Lunt concealed his own identity, while he was the only one who knew the identities of the others. Each member is based in a different American city, with the ultimate goal of world economic and political domination.

Zodiac is infiltrated by Nick Fury, posing as Scorpio. Led by Taurus, Zodiac later attempts to kill all Manhattan residents born under the sign of Gemini as a show of power, but is thwarted by the Avengers. Taurus's faction attempts to kill the Zodiac dissident faction, but all twelve leaders are captured by the Avengers. A new android version of Zodiac later appears, led by Scorpio. The group massacres the human Zodiac and takes over their criminal operations.

=== Life Model Decoy Pisces ===
The second Pisces is a Life Model Decoy (LMD) created by Scorpio. Scorpio plans to use the LMD's to serve as members of his own Zodiac organization. However, the Capricorn and Pisces androids die due to imperfections soon after their activation.

=== Third Pisces ===
After the "death" of the first Pisces LMD, Scorpio creates a second version of the Pisces LMD. This version of Pisces, along with the other members of the Zodiac LMD's, worked with Quicksilver during his bout with temporary insanity to battle the Avengers for their imagined wrongdoings. Pisces ends up facing off against Thor, who crushes it beneath a giant piece of machinery.

=== Female Pisces ===
After the destruction of both previous male versions of Pisces, Scorpio creates a female Pisces. She arranges the ambush in which the android Zodiac killed all of the remaining human Zodiac leaders except Taurus. Taurus seeks out the services of the Avengers' West Coast branch to confront and defeat the android Zodiac. In their initial foray, the Avengers fail, although several of the androids are destroyed. However, the Zodiac Key immediately resurrects the Scorpio LMD. Claiming superiority and believing that Zodiac would eventually kill the Avengers as the androids could never be stopped, Scorpio intends to use the Key to transport everyone on the scene to the Key's native dimension, where the conflict could be prolonged indefinitely. However, when the androids are transported to the other dimension, they cease to function because each of them are aligned with a particular zodiacal energy, which does not exist in the other dimension.

=== Ecliptic Pisces ===
Pisces was one of the first members of the Zodiac. Pisces was confident and a calming influence on some of the more headstrong Zodiac members. She was killed with the rest of the Zodiac by Weapon X.

=== Thanos' Pisces ===
The sixth Pisces is an unnamed male who Thanos recruited to join his incarnation of the Zodiac. He and the other Zodiac members are killed when Thanos abandons them on the self-destructing Helicarrier, with Cancer being the only survivor.

== Powers and abilities ==
Pisces is a skilled underwater combatant and wore a special outfit specifically designed for underwater combat.

The first android Pisces has a set of gills that allow her to breathe underwater. In its second form, Pisces possessed super-strength and durability. In its third form, Pisces fins, gills, and scales to assist in underwater combat and an ability to produce a watery mist from its body. She exhibits a personality based on the Pisces sign and claims to have prophetic dreams.

Ecliptic's Pisces possesses the ability to transform into water and is always in her watery form. She can surround her enemies with water and fire a blast of water. She also can alter the appearance of her human form and possesses the Zodiac teleportation device.

The sixth Pisces wears a special suit that enables him to assume a fish-like appearance.

== In other media ==
- Pisces appears in The Avengers: United They Stand. This version is a female piscine alien and member of Zodiac.
- Pisces appears in the Marvel Anime: Iron Man episode "Technical Difficulties". This version is a computer virus that was the result of research meant to convert a human's will into programming code.
