= Aries (character) =

Aries is the name of several characters appearing in American comic books published by Marvel Comics. The characters were usually depicted as members of incarnations of the supervillain group, the Zodiac.

In the history of the Marvel Universe, seven different characters have assumed the role of Aries. All of them have been members of the villainous Zodiac and used horns on their head to ram their opponents. The third Aries was a Life Model Decoy created by Jake Fury. The second and fourth Aries' were African-American.

== Publication history ==
The original human Aries, Marcus Lassiter, first appeared in The Avengers #72 (Jan. 1970), and was created by writer Roy Thomas and artist Sal Buscema. The character subsequently appears in The Avengers #82 (Nov. 1970), in which he is killed.

The second human Aries, Grover Raymond, first appeared in The Avengers #120-123 (Feb.–May 1974), and was created by Steve Englehart and Bob Brown. The character subsequently appears in Ghost Rider #7 (August 1974), and Captain America #177-178 (September–October 1974), in which he is killed.

Aries appeared as part of the "Zodiac" entry in the Official Handbook of the Marvel Universe Deluxe Edition #20.

== Fictional character biography ==
=== Marcus Lassiter ===
Aries

Publication information
- Publisher: Marvel Comics
- First appearance: The Avengers #72 (January 1970)

In-story information
- Alter ego: Marcus Lassiter
- Team affiliations: Zodiac
- Abilities: Wore a pair of ram's horns upon his head which he could use to ram opponents in battle. He briefly possessed the Zodiac Key, which he was able to use to channel energy blasts, and powered his ship's force field, which he used to surround all of Manhattan.

Nothing is known about how Lassiter joined Zodiac or any of his dealings with their group prior to their first battle with the Avengers.

Nick Fury, disguised as Scorpio, infiltrates Zodiac and captures the Avengers. He calls Zodiac for a meeting to present the Avengers to them. The Avengers manage to break free before Zodiac could execute them. Fury unmasks himself and joins the heroes in fighting off Zodiac, though Aries escapes with the Zodiac Key.

Lassiter leads the reorganization of Zodiac and its planning to take over Manhattan. A mercenary group in the Zodiac's employ is sent to Avengers Mansion and attacks the Avengers, who are placed in stasis. In the Avengers' absence, Zodiac takes over Manhattan and demands one billion dollars in exchange for sparing all of Manhattan's citizens. Black Panther and Daredevil managed to free the Avengers, and, in the ensuing battle, Aries is apparently killed.

=== Grover Raymond ===
Aries

Publication information
- Publisher: Marvel Comics
- First appearance: The Avengers #120 (February 1974)
- Created by: Steve Englehart; Bob Brown

In-story information
- Alter ego: Grover Raymond
- Team affiliations: Zodiac
- Notable aliases: Lucifer
- Abilities: Wore a ram's horns upon his head, and would ram his opponents in battle. He often carried a Star-Blazer, a pistol which could fire energy blasts. While possessed by Lucifer, his body was charged with ionic energy, granting him superhuman strength.

Grover Raymond is recruited by Taurus to replace Marcus Lassiter as Aries. Raymond participates in Zodiac's plot to kill every person born under the sign of Gemini, believing them to be untrustworthy. Zodiac is defeated by the Avengers, who destroy their Star-Blaster.

Raymond gains the support of Zodiac's members, with the exception of Libra, in overthrowing Taurus as their leader. The renegade Zodiac meets with Cornelius Van Lunt, Zodiac's financial backer, in an empty warehouse, but are attacked by the Avengers during the meeting. Van Lunt flees, revealing that he is Taurus and that the warehouse is a rocket ship, which he proceeds to shoot into space. Vision persuades Zodiac to help the Avengers get back to Earth rather than continue their battle.

While in prison, Raymond is visited by Lucifer, who has possessed the body of criminal Rafe Michel. Raymond agrees to receive some of Lucifer's power, which will divide Lucifer's powers and stop them from consuming a single body.

Raymond revives Lucifer's Ultra-Robots and sends them to attack Falcon. The Falcon and Captain America defeat Lucifer and destroy the Ultra-Robots. Still unable to contain Lucifer's energies, both host bodies die, with Lucifer being sent back to the Nameless Dimension.

=== LMD ===
Aries

Publication information
- Publisher: Marvel Comics
- First appearance: The Defenders #49 (July 1977)
- Created by: David Anthony Kraft; Keith Giffen

In-story information
- Team affiliations: Zodiac
- Abilities: Possessed a pair of horns on its head, enhanced strength, and would attempt to ram its opponents in battle. In its most recent form, it also wore a suit of protective armor, and could project fire from its horns. As a LMD, it could also exist underwater.

This version of Aries is a Life Model Decoy (LMD) created by Scorpio. When the Defenders attack Zodiac, Scorpio is forced to activate the LMD Zodiac prematurely. During the battle, Moon Knight and Nighthawk cause Aries to slam into a wall knocking it unconscious. Aries is taken into S.H.I.E.L.D. custody following the battle.

Aries and the rest of the LMD Zodiac, led by Quicksilver, battle the Avengers, whom Quicksilver is attempting to frame for treason. During an underwater battle near Avengers Mansion, Aries and Taurus are flung out into the river and apprehended by authorities.

After being released from prison, Aries and the rest of the LMD Zodiac attack and kill all of the human Zodiac members except for Taurus. Soon after, the LMD Zodiac attempt to rob the Denver Mint, but were interrupted by the West Coast Avengers. During the battle, Scorpio brings Zodiac and the Avengers to the Ankh Dimension. As an unintended consequence, the LMDs run out of energy, causing them to shut down.

=== Oscar Gordon ===
Aries

Publication information
- Publisher: Marvel Comics
- First appearance: Iron Man #184 (July 1984)
- Created by: Dennis O'Neil; Luke McDonnell

In-story information
- Alter ego: Oscar Gordon
- Team affiliations: Zodiac
- Abilities: Wore the horns of a ram on his head which he could use to ram opponents.

Not much is known about this version of Aries or how he joined Zodiac. He likely was invited by Cornelius Van Lunt as done previously. Taurus, Aquarius, and attempt to kill Iron Man (James Rhodes), but fail. In their battle, Aries is defeated and turned over to authorities. Aries is later killed by the LMD versions of the Zodiac.

=== Ecliptic Aries ===
Aries

Publication information
- Publisher: Marvel Comics
- First appearance: Alpha Flight vol. 2 #12 (July 1998)
- Created by: Steve Seagle; Duncan Rouleau

In-story information
- Team affiliations: Zodiac
- Abilities: Possessed superhuman strength, had horns, wielded a gun, and used the Zodiac's teleportation device.

This incarnation of Aries is a product of genetic engineering recruited by Scorpio, who was working for the Ecliptic. Aries and Zodiac are sent by Scorpio to steal the Nth Projector from Department H. During their mission, they are attacked by Alpha Flight, but manage to escape.

Soon after, the director of Weapon X sends a Weapon X team to the Zodiac's castle headquarters to retrieve Madison Jeffries. The Zodiac were defeated and Jeffries was recovered. The Zodiac are drained of their life energy by Sauron and left for dead as the castle explodes.

=== Thanos' Aries ===
Aries

Publication information
- Publisher: Marvel Comics
- First appearance: Avengers Assemble (vol. 2) #1 (March 2012)
- Created by: Brian Michael Bendis; Mark Bagley

In-story information
- Team affiliations: Zodiac
- Abilities: Superhuman strength Ram transformation

The sixth Aries is a criminal recruited and empowered by Thanos to recover various alien artifacts scattered around Earth. He battles the Avengers with the rest of the new Zodiac organization, but is eventually de-powered when Thanos no longer needs him. Aries and the other members of Zodiac are left for dead on the self-destructing Helicarrier.

=== Marauders' Aries ===
A mutant version of Aries with ram-like horns and hooves appears as a member of Mister Sinister's Marauders. He and the Marauders assist Sinister in a project to make mutant and Inhuman DNA compatible. During the fight with the X-Men, Aries was defeated. He, Sinister, and the other Marauders are later mentioned to have been arrested by S.H.I.E.L.D.

== Powers and abilities ==
All versions of Aries possess superhuman strength and horns, which they can use to perform a powerful ramming attack. The seventh Aries uses a suit provided by Thanos that allows him to transform into a humanoid ram.

== In other media ==
- Aries appears in The Avengers: United They Stand, voiced by Tony Daniels. This version is an alien and member of Zodiac.
- Aries appears in the Marvel Anime: Iron Man episode "Reap the Whirlwind". This version is a tornado-generating robot utilized by Zodiac.
- Aries-inspired foot soldiers appear in Ultimate Spider-Man as members of Zodiac.
