= Zodiac (comics) =

Marvel Comics fictional organization

- Eleven members of the original human Zodiac (excluding Scorpio) appear in a panel from Avengers #72 (Jan. 1970). Art by Sal Buscema.

Publication information
- Publisher: Marvel Comics
- First appearance: The Avengers #72 (Jan. 1970)
- Created by: Roy Thomas (writer); Sal Buscema (artist)

In-story information
- Member(s): Taurus (founder and leader); Aquarius; Aries; Cancer; Capricorn; Gemini; Leo; Libra; Pisces; Sagittarius; Scorpio; Virgo

Zodiac is the name of several groups of fictional characters appearing in American comic books published by Marvel Comics, first appearing in 1970.

Zodiac will make their live-action debut in a TV series of the same name in 2028 as part of the Marvel Cinematic Universe.

== Publication history ==
The first version of Zodiac, made up of humans, first appeared in The Avengers #72 (January 1970) and was created by Roy Thomas and Sal Buscema.

The second version of Zodiac, made up of androids, first appeared in The Defenders #49 (July 1977) and was created by David Anthony Kraft and Keith Giffen.

The third version of Zodiac first appeared in the second volume of Alpha Flight and was created by Steven T. Seagle (writer), Scott Clark (penciler), and Chris Carlson (inker).

The fourth version of Zodiac first appeared in The New Warriors vol. 4 #4 (November 2007) and was created by Kevin Grevioux and Joe Caramagna.

The fifth version of Zodiac first appeared in Avengers Assemble (vol. 2) #1 and was created by Brian Michael Bendis and Mark Bagley.

== Fictional team history ==
=== First Zodiac (human) ===
The original Zodiac is a criminal organization founded and funded by Cornelius van Lunt (who adopts the identity of Taurus). The group's identity is based on the Western zodiac from astrology, with each member adopting the persona of a sign of the zodiac, being twelve in all. The group members share leadership of the organization, with the position rotating as the astrological zodiac changes. When not united as a group, the members of Zodiac are all based in different cities throughout the United States, where they work to achieve economic and political domination of Earth.

After capturing the Avengers, Zodiac member Scorpio confronts them alongside the other members of Zodiac. At this time, Aries is team leader. He takes control of the Zodiac Key and acknowledges that Scorpio has redeemed himself for failing to kill Nick Fury. The Avengers are freed by fellow members Yellowjacket and Wasp, and Scorpio is revealed to be Nick Fury in disguise. The villains flee, and Fury reveals that after learning that the original Scorpio was his brother, Jake Fury, he adopted the identity to draw out the other Zodiac members.

After Aries is killed, Zodiac's members begin operating independently. However, Taurus reunites Zodiac to attack New York City with a weapon called the Star Blazer. The group encounter the Avengers once again; after a near defeat, Aries attempts to stage a coup and take power from Taurus. Aided by Zodiac member Libra, the Avengers successfully capture the other 11 members of Zodiac. Libra reveals he only aided the heroes because Avenger Mantis is his daughter.

Zodiac member Aquarius appears in the third volume of the title Ghost Rider. After learning he has cancer, Aquarius attempts to make a bargain with a demon to save himself. Aquarius then attempts to take revenge on Taurus, but his soul is claimed before he can do so. A second version of Aries makes a brief appearance in the title Captain America, where he is killed by Lucifer. Scorpio reappears in the title Defenders, where he retrieves the Zodiac Key. After creating an android version of Zodiac, Scorpio kidnaps Nighthawk, hoping to hold him for ransom. Nighthawk's teammates, the Defenders track Scorpio and encounter the android Zodiac. Discovering that three of his created Zodiac did not survive the process, Scorpio commits suicide.

=== Second Zodiac (android) ===
An android version of Zodiac first appeared in The Defenders #49 (July 1977). This android Zodiac features in the first The West Coast Avengers Annual, and are employed by former Avenger Quicksilver (under the control of the villain Maximus) to battle the Avengers. The origin of this version of Zodiac is revealed in the second volume of the title West Coast Avengers. Scorpio is resurrected in android form by the Zodiac Key once again and summons the remainder of the human Zodiac to a meeting, at which they are killed by another android version of the entire group. Taurus escapes and seeks the protection of the West Coast Avengers, who have a series of skirmishes with the androids until the false Zodiac are transported to the Ankh dimension, where they are deactivated. Taurus, who had vowed to surrender to the authorities once the threat was over, attempts to escape, only to be killed in a plane crash during a struggle with Moon Knight. The limited series Avengers Forever reveals that Libra escaped the massacre.

=== Third Zodiac (human) ===
A third, human version of Zodiac briefly feature in the second volume of the title Alpha Flight. Their leader also calls himself Scorpio, and wields a weapon reminiscent of the original Zodiac Key. Hired by Department H, a division of the Canadian military, to test Alpha Flight in battle, the group is murdered by mutant task force Weapon X.

=== Fourth Zodiac ===
Several members of a mysterious fourth version of Zodiac are mentioned in the title Young Avengers and appear in the fourth volume of the title New Warriors, and skirmish with heroes from the Initiative and New Warriors. The villain Zodiac later claims to have murdered all the members of this group and made their heads into hunting trophies.

=== Thanos' Zodiac ===
Thanos returns from the dead and forms his own incarnation of Zodiac. In a plot to rule Earth, he had special suits made for the ambitious people that want to rule the world. Thanos abandons Zodiac on a self-destructing Helicarrier, leaving John King the only survivor.

=== Zodiac Sects ===
In "All-New, All-Different Marvel", a new incarnation of Zodiac appears. This version has their Sects named after their Zodiac symbol. Each of their sects overseen by Scorpio ended up fighting Spider-Man and Mockingbird. Following one of the fights, Spider-Man finds the Zodiac Key is held in the apartment of a man named Mr. Jacobs alongside his Scorpio gear.

When the planets that are shown in the Zodiac Grand Orrery come into alignment, Scorpio travels back to his base in France and transforms several people into members of Zodiac. Spider-Man and his allies arrive to stop Scorpio. When Scorpio steps into the door, he sees the events of the next year. Catching Scorpio off guard, Spider-Man punches Scorpio into the doorway and locks it up. Spider-Man suspects that Scorpio has been teleported one year into the future, giving S.H.I.E.L.D. time to prepare for his return.

=== Solo Zodiac ===
A solo character called Zodiac starred in a self-titled limited series as part of the Dark Reign storyline. The character is obsessed with dominating the criminal underworld. He ends up gaining allies in Clown, Death Reaper, Manslaughter Marsdale, and Trapster. After they commit mass murder on one hundred H.A.M.M.E.R. agents, Zodiac retrieves the Zodiac Key from S.H.I.E.L.D. Zodiac is later revealed to have been the benefactor of the Young Masters.

=== Great Wheel of Zodiac ===
A short-lived Zodiac team known as The Great Wheel was revealed to have existed back in 1961. The team was formed by a time traveling Leonardo da Vinci who takes on the Aries mantle. He recruits members that fill out different nations and organizations with the intent to perform certain missions in exchange for special acquirements that could be used for their personal battles. The rest of the Zodiac members consisted of Cornelius Van Lunt (Taurus), Nick Fury (Gemini), Jake Fury (Scorpio), Dum Dum Dugan (Libra), John Garrett (Aquarius), Daniel Whitehall (Leo), Wolfgang von Strucker (Sagittarius), Thomas Davidson (Virgo), Shoji Soma (Pisces), Vasili Dassaiev (Capricorn), and Viktor Uvarov (Cancer). After completing their missions and collecting the items needed, Dassaiev and Uvarov betrayed the group.

== Membership ==
=== First Zodiac members ===
- Taurus (leader) - Cornelius Van Lunt is a businessman and crime lord who is the founder of Zodiac and wears a bull costume.
- Aquarius - Darren Bentley is a crime lord and member of Zodiac with expert fighting skills.
- Aquarius - Zachary Drebb has a genius-level intellect and makes use of different gimmicks.
- Aries - Marcus Lassiter, Grover Raymond, and Oscar Gordon are members of Zodiac who use horned helmets, giving them a powerful ramming attack.
- Cancer - Jack Klevano is a criminal mastermind who wears a crab costume equipped with pincers.
- Capricorn - Willard Weer is a crime lord who is an expert at martial arts and the horns on his head can extend to grab opponents.
- Gemini - Joshua Link is a crime lord who possesses a psychic link with his twin brother, Sgt. Damian Link.
- Leo - Daniel Radford is a criminal mastermind who wears a lion costume and wields clawed gloves.
- Libra - Gustav Brandt is a blind crime lord, mercenary, and the father of Mantis who is an expert at martial arts and has a psychic sense that helps him see.
- Pisces - Noah Perricone is a criminal mastermind who wears a special outfit designed for underwater combat.
- Sagittarius - Harlan Vargus is a crime lord who is skilled at hand-to-hand combat.
- Scorpio - Jake Fury is the brother of Nick Fury. He created the second Zodiac, which killed most of the original Zodiac.
- Scorpio - Jacques LaPoint is a criminal mastermind who was brought in to replace Jake Fury as Scorpio.
- Virgo - Elaine McLaughlin is a criminal mastermind who is skilled at hand-to-hand combat.

=== Second Zodiac members ===
- Scorpio (leader)
- Aquarius - An android who carries a gun that shoots electricity and water.
- Aries - An android who possesses ram-like horns, giving it a powerful ramming attack. Its second form had armor and fired lasers from its horns.
- Cancer - An android who possesses an armored shell. Its second form can release powerful jets of water from its hands. Its third form has pincers in place of hands.
- Capricorn - An android with goat-like horns. Its second form is an expert climber and possesses glider wings for flight.
- Gemini - An android who can release two duplicates of itself. The white duplicate fires energy blasts and the black duplicate has an electrical touch, expand its form, and possess super-strength. Its second form can fly and release blasts of energy.
- Leo - An android who possesses claws and super-strength. Its second body was designed to resemble Tigra complete with her abilities.
- Libra - An android who can fly and become intangible.
- Pisces - An android who can survive underwater and possesses fins, gills, and scales. Its second form possesses enhanced strength and durability. Its third form can create watery mist.
- Sagittarius - An android equipped with wrist-mounted crossbows that fire different arrows. Its second form was constructed to resemble Hawkeye.
- Taurus - An android equipped with retractable horns on his wrists attached to cables can be fired at opponents and can detect heat and organics. Its second form possesses super-strength enhanced strength and immunity to heat.
- Virgo - An android with energy-siphoning abilities.

=== Third Zodiac members ===
- Scorpius (leader) - He had a barbed tail as part of his costume.
- Aquarius - He can fire beams of unidentified energy from his hands.
- Aries - He possessed ram horns on his helmet which can be used for ramming, possesses super-strength, and wielded a gun.
- Cancer - A crab-like member possessed super-strength, wore armor, and attacks with his pincers.
- Capricorn - He possesses super-strength, attacks with his horns, and wielded a gun.
- Gemini - Gemini consists of two men, including a mind-controlled Madison Jeffries. It is unknown what powers the "twin" had.
- Leo - A lion-like member who possesses super-strength and powerful claws and fangs.
- Libra - He wielded a staff and an energy-charged sword.
- Pisces - She can generate, control, and turn into water.
- Sagittarius - A bow-wielding centaur and lover of Pisces.
- Taurus - A huge humanoid cattle who possessed super-strength.
- Virgo - The girlfriend of Scorpio who wields guns and bows.

=== Fourth Zodiac members ===
- Aquarius - A Japanese woman.
- Aries - A German man.
- Cancer - An Israeli woman.
- Leo - A Nigerian man.
- Libra - An American woman.
- Pisces - A Russian man.
- Sagittarius - A French woman.
- Taurus - A Mexican man.
- Virgo - An American woman.

=== Members of Thanos' Zodiac ===
- Thanos (leader)
- Aquarius - A man who wears a special super-suit provided by Thanos that enables him to assume a watery substance of unknown origin that can control water.
- Aries - A man who wore a special super-suit provided by Thanos which gave him super-strength and enabled him to assume the form of a humanoid ram. Died in the Helicarrier explosion.
- Cancer - The identity of Hood's cousin John King who wore a special super-suit provided by Thanos that gives him the appearance of a humanoid crab.
- Capricorn - A man with a goatee.
- Gemini - An Asian man who wore a special super-suit provided by Thanos that enables him to become two beings.
- Leo - A bearded man with long blonde hair who wears a special suit provided by Thanos that enables him to assume the form of a humanoid lion.
- Libra - A red-haired woman who wore a special suit that gave her an energy-based appearance.
- Pisces - A blonde-haired man who wears a special suit provided by Thanos that enables him to assume a fish-like appearance.
- Sagittarius - A man with a moustache.
- Scorpio - A man with a half-burned face.
- Taurus - An African-American man who wears a special super-suit provided by Thanos which enables him to possess super-strength and transform into a Minotaur-like form.
- Virgo - A brown-haired woman who wears a special suit provided by Thanos that transforms her into a winged female with a fiery head.

=== Members of the Zodiac Sects ===
- Scorpio (leader) - The identity of Vernon Fury.
- Aquarius - A member of Zodiac with hydrokinesis supposedly provided by her gauntlets.
- Aries - A ram-masked member of Zodiac.
- Cancer - A crab-masked member of Zodiac.
- Capricorn - A member of Zodiac with goat-like horns on his mask.
- Gemini - Two female members of Zodiac where one of them is looped from the future and having the knowledge of the future for 24 hours.
- Leo - A lion-masked member of Zodiac.
- Libra - A female member of Zodiac.
- Pisces - A fish-masked member of Zodiac.
- Sagittarius - A member of Zodiac who is an expert archer.
- Taurus - A bull-armored member of Zodiac.
- Virgo - A member of Zodiac.

== Other versions ==
=== Ultimate Marvel ===
The Zodiac Key appears in Ultimate Spider-Man, where it is sought after by Wilson Fisk and Mysterio. Additionally, an unrelated street gang called the Zodiacs appears in All-New Ultimates.

== In other media ==
- Zodiac appears in The Avengers: United They Stand, led by Taurus and consisting of Scorpio, Aquarius, Aries, Cancer, Capricorn, Gemini, Leo, Libra, Pisces, Sagittarius, and Virgo. This version of the group are aliens from another galaxy who seek to obtain the Zodiac Key.
- Zodiac appears in Marvel Anime: Iron Man, led by Kuroda and consisting of Ho Yinsen and their brainwashed sleeper agent Chika Tanaka / Gemini. This version of the group is a terrorist organization affiliated with A.I.M. that employs advanced technology and mechs based on the astrological symbols. Throughout the series, Zodiac seeks to take control of Tony Stark's new Arc Station, meant to supply free energy to the world, and use its power to fuel a coup d'état within Japan's government to rebuild it as a militarized nation for Zodiac to dominate the world.
- Zodiac appears in Ultimate Spider-Man, led by Max Fury / Scorpio and consisting of foot soldiers inspired by Taurus, Aries, and Leo who wear masks based on their respective astrological symbol.
- Zodiac will appear in an upcoming TV series of the same name as part of the Marvel Cinematic Universe, set to be released in 2028.
