= Gianconiglio =

Italian comic strip

- Genre: Humor/comedy

Creative team
- Created by: Carlo Peroni

Gianconiglio, internationally known as Sonny, is an Italian comic strip created by Carlo Peroni.

The comic strip started in 1971, published in the comics magazine Il Corriere dei Piccoli, with Carlo Triberti as scriptwriter; it was translated in a number of foreign countries, remarkably obtaining a great success in Germany. Over the years several other authors alternated, such as Roberto Arghinoni, Francois Corteggiani and Umberto Volpini as writers and Umberto Manfrin, Pinù Intini and Attilio Ortolani as artists.
