= Zio Boris =

Italian comic strip

- Genre: Humor/comedy

Creative team
- Written by: Alfredo Castelli
- Artist(s): Carlo Peroni; Daniele Fagarazzi

Zio Boris ("Uncle Boris" in Italian) is the title character of an Italian humorous comic strip series created by Alfredo Castelli as writer and by Carlo Peroni as artist.

== Background ==
The comic series was ideated by Alfredo Castelli in 1964, but eventually debuted only in 1970, in the comic magazine Horror.

In 1971 all the strips published in the magazine and about one hundred unpublished strips were collected in the volume Zio Boris, published by New Time. In 1972 the comic strips started being published by Il Corriere dei Ragazzi, with Daniele Fagarazzi replacing Peroni as artist. Later the strips were published in the newspapers Gazzetta del Popolo and Corriere d'Informazione, and in the magazines Tilt, Cucciolo and Doctor Beruscus.

The series tells the adventures of a mad scientist (Zio Boris) who assisted by strange creatures including a vampire, a werewolf and a flying skull makes insane experiments. The stories include citations from The Addams Family and from classical 1930s horror films, as well as satirical cues based on current events.
