= Boofhead =

Australian comic strip character created by R. B. Clark

Boofhead was an Australian comic strip character created by R. B. Clark, a 'methods engineer from the Sydney suburb of Concord' who drew the strip of the same name between 1941 and 1970. When Clark died on 21 May 1970 the strip was discontinued. The character had already become iconic, particularly through its use in art by Martin Sharp, and continues to have currency.

Boofhead featured in many Australian newspapers during its run; these included the Sydney Daily Mirror, the West Australian Beverley Times, and various editions of Truth. Strips were also compiled in regular reprint books. During the time of Boofhead's emergence, the majority of these papers were published by Ezra Norton, though the Mirror was obtained by Rupert Murdoch's News Limited in 1958.

Boofhead debuted in the first issue of the Daily Mirror on 12 May 1941. For the first eight instalments Boofhead was a pantomime strip, in which no-one spoke; Boofhead's first words (on 22 May) were in a courtroom scene, in which he said 'I'd like to hear the other constable's evidence!' The next strip also referenced criminality, when Boofhead entered a police station and responded to a poster announcing 'Man Wanted for Robbery' that he would take the job.

== Attributes ==
Boofhead's character soon became clear. Though an innocent, he was not loyal or kindhearted and only naive in the sense that he was extremely foolish. Clark's drawing ability was rudimentary (legend suggests that once the strip had become popular, he started drawing lessons 'because he felt his technique was amateurish' but his employers at the Mirror 'told him that on no account was he to change his style'). This primitive approach was arguably the reason Clark was able to get away with jokes which might have seemed overly risqué in the work of a more accomplished artist: for instance, when he is asked to serve a salad 'without dressing', Boofhead removes his clothes to bring it to the table. This strain of humour may have seemed more acceptable in context, as Boofhead appeared on the same page of the Mirror as the notoriously salacious Jane.

== Family ==
As the central character of a 'gag' strip, Boofhead would make a variety of claims from day to day, with little 'world building'. However, he first mentioned a brother on 18 June 1941 (a brother who was so similar to him, he claimed, that 'last week I died, and they buried my brother'. Readers were to meet Boofhead's brother Goofhead when the strip ran in an expanded Sunday version. Boofhead's mother, who was not named, frequently appeared in the strip after 9 July 1941.

== Boofhead as 'pop art' ==
Artist Martin Sharp commonly incorporated elements of Australiana he considered iconic into both his illustration and fine art work. Boofhead appeared in key Sharp works, both before and after the demise of Clark's strip. The cover of the March 1966 issue of Oz, which depicted Boofhead declaring 'I don't give a stuff about opera' is one example, as is a 1978 image entitled Boofhead and the Thinker reimagined in 1991 as Art Galaxy. Sharp's artwork Wave, featuring Boofhead encountering a tidal wave in the style of Hokusai, was produced in different iterations as late as 1990. In the same year, Sharp produced a series of record covers for Regular Records, all featuring Boofhead. These included Regular Records 1979 - 1989 Greatest Hits and Regular Records 1979-1989 Hits That Missed.

Peter Kingston, another well-known Sydney artist and an associate of Sharp's, also incorporated Boofhead into his work. In 1984, Kingston put his 'England versus Australia' chess set on the market: Boofhead was featured as one of the pieces. In 2001, he designed an Australian flag with Boofhead's face on it for the 'Mambo Flags Exhibition' and crafted a sculpture entitled Bird with Boofhead to assist in raising funds for the Barren Grounds Nature Reserve. In 2020, he created a 'Boofhead lamp', a figure of Boofhead with a lampshade decorated with scenes from Boofhead strips.

== The Colossus of Leura ==
In 1992 the barrister and gallery owner Clive Evatt - not to be confused with his politician-barrister father - unveiled a 4.5 metre wood and tin statue of Boofhead at his property in Leura. The work was commissioned by Evatt from Lithgow engineer Steven Bell. Evatt claimed that the statue, which he called the Colossus of Leura, was an attempt to counter tendency of the Blue Mountains to be 'nature, all nature... I decided to liven the place up'.

== Popular parlance ==
The word 'boofhead' does not appear in G. A. Wilkes' A Dictionary of Australian Colloquialisms. However the term is at least a century old, and predates the comic strip by more than a decade. In 1924, Constable Cohan of Casino, New South Wales took action against a youth, Ernest Ellem, who had referred to him as 'Boof' which, in court, Ellem revealed was a shortened version of his nickname 'Boofhead'. The case was dismissed. In 1933, a fanciful story in Smith's Weekly by Angus O'Cohen about a flea named Denis made an oblique reference to the 'Buggles-Boofhead dance' held in the lounge of the Hotel Splendide. Since the 1940s, the word has generally been used in a way that denotes mildly affectionate disrespect, though it was more barbed when, in 2022 Anthony Albanese, shortly before winning the Federal election and becoming prime minister, notoriously referred to Peter Dutton by this word. Tony Wright wrote of Albanese in 2022: 'His toughness went on display in Parliament earlier this year when he told Defence Minister Peter Dutton to “sit down, boofhead”.'
