= Carlo Peroni =

Italian comic book artist

Carlo Peroni (29 November 1929 – 13 December 2011), also known as Perogatt, was an Italian comic book artist.

Born in Senigallia, Ancona, Peroni started his career in 1946 as a restorer and an icon painter. In 1948 he started collaborating with the children magazine Il Giornalino, then he worked for a number of Italian and European magazines and newspapers, such as Corriere dei Piccoli, Guerin Sportivo, Bild-Zeitung. He also collaborated with RAI and wrote several books.

Devoted to humorous comics, Peroni created, among others, Gianconiglio (also known as Sonny), Zio Boris, Nerofumo, Paciocco, Ispettore Perogatt. He was also founder and author of the comics magazine Slurp!.
