= Lucifer (Marvel Comics) =

Two fictional characters in Marvel Comics

Lucifer is the name of two unrelated characters appearing in American comic books published by Marvel Comics. One is an alien supervillain of the X-Men and the other is a villain of Ghost Rider and is referred to as the Prince of Darkness.

== Publication history ==
The first Lucifer first appearance was in The X-Men #9 (Jan. 1965) and was created by Stan Lee and Jack Kirby. He is an agent of the Quists, an alien race who are also known as the Arcane.

== Fictional character biography ==
=== Lucifer (Quists) ===
Lucifer

Publication information
- Publisher: Marvel Comics
- First appearance: The X-Men #9 (Jan. 1965)
- Created by: Stan Lee and Jack Kirby

In-story information
- Species: Quist
- Notable aliases: Agent One
- Abilities: Telepathy; Ionic manipulation

Lucifer is an alien who originates from the planet Quistalium. He first comes to Earth as an advance agent for the invasion of Earth by the Arcane (also known as the Quists), and places several humans under his control, allowing him to take control of a small area. This invasion is foiled by a young Charles Xavier. In retaliation, Lucifer drops an enormous stone block on Xavier, leaving him paraplegic.

Lucifer returns to Earth years after paralyzing Xavier and battles Xavier once again in the Balkan Mountains. He has a device attached to his own heart that will set off a bomb if he is killed, but it is defused by Cyclops.

Lucifer is exiled to an alternate realm known as the "Nameless Dimension". There, he uses "ionic energy" to give himself superhuman strength and the ability to project force beams from his hands, in addition to his apparently pre-existing telepathic powers. He continues to try conquering Earth by using his "dimensional transmitter" to imbue humans with ionic energy and turn them into his minions.

Lucifer returned in Astonishing X-Men (2017), where he takes over the town of Lago, making its residents tolerable to mutants in spite of Lago's longstanding hatred against mutants. When the original members of the X-Men arrange a reunion in Lago, they uncover Lucifer's plan. Archangel kills Lucifer, but inadvertently kills the civilians he had been influencing.

=== Lucifer (Prince of Darkness) ===
Lucifer (Prince of Darkness)

Publication information
- Publisher: Marvel Comics
- First appearance: Ghost Rider (vol. 6) #1 (September 2006)
- Created by: Daniel Way; Javier Saltares; Mark Texeira

In-story information
- Notable aliases: Prince of Darkness, Prince of Lies
- Abilities: Immortality; Superhuman strength Immense demonic power

Lucifer is a supervillain in Marvel Comics, mostly associated with Ghost Rider.

Lucifer is a powerful entity whose true history is unknown. It is believed that he was once an angel who led other angels in banishing the N'Garai from Earth and led a group of followers in a rebellion against God. Following his defeat, Lucifer and his lieutenants were cast down to Hell as punishment, where they transformed into demons over time. Lucifer escapes from Hell by 'following' Ghost Rider during his latest escape from Hell.

== Powers and abilities ==
The Quist version of Lucifer has a gifted intellect, and extensive knowledge of advanced Quistalian science and technology, and talent as an inventor using this technology. Lucifer can manipulate ionic energy for various effects, including enhancing his physical strength and leaping ability to superhuman levels, creating protective force fields, and projecting powerful concussive bolts. Lucifer can fuse his physical and mental essence with others, creating a psychic link between them and giving the host access to Lucifer's powers.

The demon version of Lucifer can create interdimensional portals, perform image projection, demonic possession, do mystical force blasts, illusion casting, shift shape and size, matter manipulation, raising the dead, manipulating the dead, and regenerating the corpses of those he inhabits. Lucifer does not need to eat, drink, or sleep. He is also immune to aging and disease.
