= Scorpio (Marvel Comics) =

Scorpio is the name of several fictional characters appearing in American comic books published by Marvel Comics. Most of the characters to use the Scorpio identity have been supervillains affiliated with the Zodiac criminal cartel, and in this context were enemies of the Avengers and other superheroes.

== Publication history ==
Jake Fury first appeared in Strange Tales #159 (Aug. 1967), and was created by Jim Steranko. He also appeared in Sgt. Fury and his Howling Commandos #68-69 (July–Aug. 1969).

The character subsequently appeared as Scorpio in Nick Fury, Agent of S.H.I.E.L.D. #1 (June 1968), #5 (Oct. 1968), The Avengers #72 (Jan. 1970), The Defenders #46 (April 1977), #48-49 (June–July 1977), #50 (Aug. 1977), West Coast Avengers vol. 2 Annual #1 (1986), West Coast Avengers vol. 2 #26-28 (Nov. 1987-January 1988), Wolverine/Nick Fury: The Scorpio Connection (1989), Fury #1 (May 1994), and Fury of S.H.I.E.L.D. #4 (July 1995).

Jacob Fury received an entry in the Official Handbook of the Marvel Universe Deluxe Edition #17.

== Fictional character biography ==
=== Scorpio (Jake Fury) ===
Scorpio
- Cover to the "Nick Fury: Scorpio" TPB reprinting the first appearance of Scorpio. Art by Jim Steranko.

Publication information
- Publisher: Marvel Comics
- First appearance: (as Jake Fury): Strange Tales #159 (August 1967) (as Scorpio): Nick Fury, Agent of S.H.I.E.L.D. #1 (June 1968)
- Created by: (Jake): Jim Steranko

In-story information
- Alter ego: Jacob Fury
- Team affiliations: Zodiac; Great Wheel; Hydra
- Notable aliases: Flip Mason, Count Julio Scarlotti, Nick Fury

Jacob "Jake" Fury was born in New York City. As a young man, he came to resent his brother Nick Fury. As the original Scorpio, he operated as a spy, terrorist, and criminal. Nick later went undercover as Scorpio and took his brother's place in the organization Zodiac. Scorpio constructed a set of android Zodiac members to serve him in his base at Belleville, New Jersey. However, his plan was thwarted by the Defenders and he committed suicide through self-inflicted gunshot wound in despair.

In the series Secret Warriors, it is revealed that the Scorpio who died was a clone of Jake Fury created by ancient technology that was the predecessor to the Life Model Decoy androids. The real Jake had been undercover within Hydra to help bring about the organization's destruction.

=== LMD and Jacques LaPoint ===
Scorpio

Publication information
- Publisher: Marvel Comics
- First appearance: (Jacques LaPoint): Avengers #120 (Feb. 1974) (Android): West Coast Avengers vol. 2 Annual #1 (Oct. 1986)
- Created by: (Jacques LaPoint): Steve Englehart, Don Heck (Android): Steve Englehart

In-story information
- Alter ego: Jacques LaPoint
- Team affiliations: Zodiac; Great Wheel
- Notable aliases: Flip Mason, Jacques LaPoint, Count Julio Scarlotti, Nick Fury

Scorpio was later revived in an android body by the Zodiac Key from which he drew his power. The real Jacques LaPoint became the second Scorpio and led the Zodiac until Jake (in his second android body) killed him. Impersonating LaPoint, Fury leads eleven other Zodiac-themed androids to kill and replace the rest of the human Zodiac members, and takes over the organization's criminal operations. Scorpio and the other androids are deactivated after being transported to the Zodiac Key's dimension of origin during a battle with the West Coast Avengers.

=== Ecliptic Scorpio ===
Another Scorpio was the leader of Ecliptic's Zodiac team who fought Alpha Flight and was later massacred by Malcolm Colcord's Weapon X team.

=== Scorpio (Mikel Fury) ===
Scorpio

Publication information
- Publisher: Marvel Comics
- First appearance: Wolverine/Nick Fury: The Scorpio Connection, Marvel Graphic Novel #50 (Aug. 1989)
- Created by: Archie Goodwin, Howard Chaykin

In-story information
- Alter ego: Mikel Fury
- Team affiliations: S.H.I.E.L.D.

Mikel Fury, Nick Fury's illegitimate son, has also used the Scorpio identity. Mikel originally believed himself to be Jake Fury's son and used a duplicate of the Zodiac Key to battle his father and Wolverine. After learning that his mother had lied about his parentage, Mikel reforms, undergoes intensive therapy, and becomes affiliated with S.H.I.E.L.D. After being falsely convinced that the Punisher had killed Nick, Mikel purses Punisher until he is persuaded to back down and ousted from S.H.I.E.L.D. He makes a brief appearance in Secret Warriors, issue 11 as the leader from one of Nick's secret independent teams, and is later killed in a mission.

=== Thanos' Zodiac ===
The sixth Scorpio is an unnamed man with a half-burned face who Thanos recruited to join his incarnation of the Zodiac. He and the other Zodiac members are killed when Thanos abandons them on the self-destructing Helicarrier, with Cancer being the only survivor.

=== Scorpio (Vernon Fury) ===
Vernon Fury is the grandson of Jacob Fury and the grand-nephew of Nick Fury. After being told stories about the Zodiac Key, Vernon planned to learn what its secrets are. As an adult, Vernon becomes an investor and shareholder of Parker Industries. With the money he obtained, he forms the sects of Zodiac. Following a premonition from Gemini, he hacks into a satellite owned by S.H.I.E.L.D. which he uses to look into the British Museum. He learns that the Rosetta Stone contains the Zodiac Grand Orrery.

When the planets that are shown in the Zodiac Grand Orrery come into alignment, Scorpio travels to the Royal Observatory in Greenwich. At the Royal Observatory, Scorpio places the Zodiac Grand Orrery in the prime meridian and opens a secret passageway underground. When Scorpio steps into the door, he sees the events of the next year: the emergence of the Skyspear, Norman Osborn's latest activity, Regent's plot, the "New U" device, Doctor Octopus' return, another superhuman civil war, and the rise of the monsters. Catching Scorpio off guard, Spider-Man punches Scorpio into the doorway and locks it up. Spider-Man suspects that Scorpio has been teleported one year into the future, giving S.H.I.E.L.D. time to prepare for his return.

== Powers and abilities ==
Jake Fury possessed a genius intellect, as well as basic army training, with an above average knowledge of hand-to-hand combat and streetfighting techniques. As Scorpio, Jake used the Zodiac Key to increase his physical abilities, and gain superhuman powers such as the ability to transform his body into sentient water for brief periods of time. Scorpio is dependent upon the Zodiac Key to maintain his superhuman powers, but does not have to be in physical contact with the Key to wield it. The Zodiac Key is a power object of extradimensional origin that possesses a degree of sentience and harnesses an unidentified extradimensional energy for a variety of effects, including concussive force, electricity, magnetism, teleportation, and physical transformation.

Ecliptic's Zodiac had a barbed tail which was never used in combat. He also wielded a weapon similar to the Zodiac Key which displayed the ability to fire energy blasts and has a Zodiac teleportation device.

== Other versions ==
The Ultimate Marvel version of Scorpio is mentioned to have been killed years earlier during a conflict in the Middle East, and now used by Nick Fury as an alias while undercover to infiltrate Hydra.

== In other media ==
- Scorpio appears in The Avengers: United They Stand, voiced by Wayne Best. This version is a scorpion-like alien who serves as Taurus' right hand within Zodiac and can assume the human form and alias of "Jake Fury".
- The Scorpio identity appears in The Super Hero Squad Show episode "From the Atom... It Rises!", in which it is used by Nick Fury (voiced by Kevin Michael Richardson).
- Scorpio appears in Marvel Anime: Iron Man, voiced by Kyle Hebert in the English dub. This version is a mass-produced, scorpion-like mech used by Zodiac.
- Scorpio appears in Ultimate Spider-Man, voiced by Phil Morris. This version is Max Fury, the African-American younger brother of Nick Fury and leader of Zodiac.
- Scorpio appears in The Avengers: Earth's Mightiest Heroes #3.
