= The Avengers: United They Stand =

American superhero animated series

- Genre: Superhero
- Based on: Avengers by: Stan Lee; Jack Kirby
- Developed by: Eric Lewald; Julia Lewald
- Directed by: Ron Myrick
- Voices of: Linda Ballantyne; Tony Daniels; Graham Harley; Hamish McEwan; Ray Landry; Caroly Larson; Stavroula Logothettis; Martin Roach; Ron Rubin; John Stocker; Rod Wilson; Lenore Zann
- Narrated by: George Johnson
- Opening theme: "The Avengers: United They Stand" by Sky Flyers
- Composers: Jeremy Sweet; Deddy Tzur; Shuki Levy; Kussa Mahchi
- Country of origin: United States
- No. of episodes: 13

Production
- Executive producers: Avi Arad; Eric S. Rollman; Stan Lee
- Producer: Ron Myrick
- Running time: 22 minutes
- Production companies: Marvel Studios; Saban Entertainment; Fox Family Worldwide; Saerom Animation

Original release
- Network: Fox Kids
- Release: October 30, 1999 – February 26, 2000

Related
- The Avengers: Earth's Mightiest Heroes; Avengers Assemble

The Avengers: United They Stand (also known simply as The Avengers) is an American animated television series based on the Marvel Comics superhero team Avengers. It consists of 13 episodes, which originally premiered on October 30, 1999, and was produced by Avi Arad. It was canceled on February 26, 2000.

The series features 2 founders of the team, Ant-Man and the Wasp, and introduces Wonder Man, Tigra, Hawkeye, Falcon, Vision and Scarlet Witch.

Ownership of the series eventually passed to Disney following Saban Entertainment's closure, which also includes Marvel Productions.

== Plot ==
The series features a team broadly based on the West Coast Avengers, composed of the Wasp, Wonder Man, Tigra, Hawkeye, Scarlet Witch, Falcon, and Vision, and led by Ant-Man/Giant-Man. For undetermined reasons, the Avengers' "Big Three" were not regular fixtures in the series – Captain America and Iron Man made only guest appearances in one episode each, while Thor did not appear outside of the opening titles.

The series features many of the Avengers' major comic book foes, including Ultron, Kang the Conqueror, Egghead, the Masters of Evil (consisting of Baron Helmut Zemo, Absorbing Man, Boomerang, Tiger Shark, Moonstone, Dragonfly, Cardinal, and Whirlwind), Grim Reaper, and Zodiac, as well as associated characters the Swordsman, the Circus of Crime, Namor, Attuma, Agatha Harkness, and the Salem's Seven.

== Cast ==
Part of the Avengers roster. Left to right: Tigra, Falcon, Scarlet Witch, Hawkeye and Vision.

- Linda Ballantyne as Wasp
- Tony Daniels as Hawkeye, Aries, Aquarius, Brutacus
- Graham Harley as Edwin Jarvis
- Ray Landry as Raymond Sikorski
- Carolyn Larson as Computer
- Stavroula Logothettis as Scarlet Witch
- Hamish McEwan as Wonder Man
- Gerry Mendicino as Taurus
- Martin Roach as Falcon
- Ron Ruben as Vision
- John Stocker as Ultron
- Rod Wilson as Ant-Man
- Lenore Zann as Tigra

=== Additional voices ===
- Denis Akiyama as Dr. Chris Johnson (in "Kang")
- Philip Akin as Attuma
- Oliver Becker as Carl "Crusher" Creel / Absorbing Man
- Wayne Best as Scorpio
- Normand Bissonette as Ringmaster
- Dan Chameroy as Captain America
- Conrad Coates as Remnant Leader (in "Remnants")
- Rob Cowan as Boomerang
- Carlos Diaz as Tiger Shark
- Francis Diakowsky as Iron Man
- Paul Essiembre as Swordsman
- Nigel Hamer as Gemini (male head)
- Ken Kramer as Kang the Conqueror
- Robert Latimer as Elihas Starr / Egghead
- Julie Lemieux as Gemini (female head)
- Stephen Ouimette as Nicholas Scratch
- Susan Roman as Moonstone, Dragonfly
- Tate Roswell as Andrew Wilson (in "Kang")
- Allan Royal as Grim Reaper
- Elizabeth Shepherd as Agatha Harkness
- Phillip Shepherd as Helmut Zemo
- Raoul Trujillo as Namor
- Peter Wildman as Cardinal, Whirlwind

=== Appearing in the comics ===
- Natasha Romanova / Black Widow
- Baron Strucker
- Hydra
- Nathan Garrett / Black Knight
- Doctor Doom
- A.I.M.
- Collector

== Production ==
In 1997, Roland Poindexter, the supervising executive in charge of animated series at Fox Kids Network, approached two X-Men (1992) animated series writers named Robert N. Skir and Marty Isenberg to develop a proposal for an Avengers cartoon. After creating a detailed Bible that included a 13-episode story arc, the network decided a Captain America series would be more suited to its schedule. But before Fox Kids could green light either series, Marvel went into bankruptcy, effectively ending the development process for all its shows. It was not until after the publisher's financial woes were resolved in late 1998 that Poindexter revived interest in the Avengers project, using the series bible written by Robert N. Skir and Marty Isenberg; because Skir and Isenberg were already committed to spearhead Beast Machines: Transformers, the network approached former X-Men animated series story editor Eric Lewald and his wife, Julia, to come on board as story editors for the series. In January 1999, Fox finally gave the official go-ahead and Ron Myrick was hired to oversee the show's visual development.

The Avengers roster for the cartoon is loosely based upon the roster for the 1984 Avengers spin-off series The West Coast Avengers. Notably absent from the lineup are the traditional core members: Captain America, Iron Man, and Thor, who were originally prohibited from appearing in the series due to licensing issues. Story editor Eric Lewald has commented on their absence and had said "We want this to be a team of Avengers, instead of making it 'Captain America and the Avengers' or 'Thor and the Avengers. We prefer to have a balanced team of superheroes rather than a superstar on the team." However, Captain America and Iron Man each made one guest appearance (in "Command Decision" and "Shooting Stars", respectively), while Thor did not appear outside of the opening sequence.

The decision to pair Scarlet Witch and Wonder Man up as a couple was based upon the storyline then running in the Avengers comic in which Scarlet Witch resurrects Wonder Man to serve as her protector after an evil sorceress transforms the planet into a medieval world under her control. During their time together, the two fall in love and become a couple.

In the promotional images of the series, and the action figure photos, Hawkeye did not wear a mask. However, in the series and the final version of the figure, he wore a mask similar to that he wore during the Avengers: The Crossing storyline.

This series was commissioned by Fox in the wake of the success of Batman Beyond (1999). In order to attempt to emulate Batman Beyond, changes were made to the Avengers franchise as the series was set in the future. Myrick explained that they were "setting the series about twenty-five years in the future" and that "New York City will be a mix of future and contemporary looks, sort of the way the city looked in the movie Blade Runner (1982) but not as dark." The Avengers were also featured wearing elaborate armor costumes when they went into battle. Myrick explained, "The armor will give them the capability to go into different environments like extreme heat or cold, or underwater, or outer space, and it'll enhance their abilities." The Avengers also featured an "A" on their costumes that was like a Star Trek comlink, where they could hit it and communicate with each other and the mansion's computer.

== Episodes ==
The following list reflects the correct viewing order of The Avengers: United They Stand episodes, according to Marvel's official site.

| No. | Title | Written by | Original release date |
|---|---|---|---|
| 1 | "Avengers Assemble: Part 1" | Michael Edens | October 30, 1999 |
Ultron creates the Vision and sends him to destroy Ant-Man. Note: In addition to the close-ups on the pictures of Captain America, Thor, and Iron Man near the beginning, pictures of Beast, Black Panther, Hulk, Namor, Quicksilver, and two others can be seen in both conference room scenes.
| 2 | "Avengers Assemble: Part 2" | Michael Edens | November 6, 1999 |
Wonder Man is put on life support and the Avengers must take over where he fell. Falcon joins the team and Vision is reprogrammed with a copy of Wonder Man's mind.
| 3 | "Kang" | Brooks Wachtel | November 13, 1999 |
After being accidentally freed from his urn prison by Dr. Chris Johnson and Falcon's nephew Andrew, Kang the Conqueror starts to create havoc while looking for a special crystal obelisk from ancient Egypt, an object which would allow him to go back into the future and oppress millions of people. The Avengers must protect the world—past, present, and future—at all costs.
| 4 | "Comes a Swordsman" | John Loy | November 27, 1999 |
Hawkeye must face his past and his old mentor the Swordsman. Meanwhile, the Avengers face a group of thieves led by Ringmaster, who has robbed a biological weapons study lab. Note: The paper that Hawkeye glances at is the Daily Bugle.
| 5 | "Remnants" | Michael Edens | December 4, 1999 |
Strange remnants of Ultron's previous experiments create terror on an island where France's main nuclear testing facility exists. The Avengers race to control or destroy these machines before they start a nuclear war, not counting on Ultron paying a visit as well. Note: A picture of Beast briefly appears on the wall during the Avengers' meeting.
| 6 | "Command Decision" | Len Wein | December 11, 1999 |
The Avengers must stop the Masters of Evil (consisting of Baron Helmut Zemo, Tiger Shark, Absorbing Man, Moonstone, Whirlwind, Boomerang, Cardinal, and Dragonfly) who are trying to steal a shipment of highly dangerous government weapons. To make matters more difficult, Captain America comes on the scene, leaving Ant-Man to work out his leadership issues while still focusing on the job at hand.
| 7 | "To Rule Atlantis" | Len Uhley | December 18, 1999 |
When mysterious earthquakes are artificially caused, the Avengers suspect Prince Namor of Atlantis, so they go under the sea to investigate. They discover that Namor is innocent and Attuma is using the Dynamo machine to create earthquakes in his plot to conquer Atlantis. During this time, Vision is jealous of Namor's kind and loving expression toward the Scarlet Witch.
| 8 | "Shooting Stars" | Bruce Reid Schaefer | January 22, 2000 |
The whole world is threatened when satellites are blasted out of their orbits. Learning that the criminal organization Zodiac is behind the chaos, the Avengers call upon Iron Man for help and rocket into space to stop the blackmail of Earth's cities.
| 9 | "What a Vision Has to Do" | John Loy | January 29, 2000 |
Vision volunteers to be "bait" to allow himself to be captured by Ultron as a way for the Avengers to track him to the villain's lair. It works, but Ultron is ready for them. Note: This is Ultron's last appearance in the series.
| 10 | "Egg-Streme Vengeance" | Len Uhley | February 5, 2000 |
Egghead initiates a plot to destroy his archrival Ant-Man by making his "Pym particles" go crazy. The Avengers must prevent Ant-Man from shrinking to subatomic oblivion. Note: The name of the entertainment-news host that appears on the TV is Ron Myrick, the given name of the show's producer and director.
| 11 | "The Sorceress's Apprentice" | Michael Edens | February 12, 2000 |
Scarlet Witch, along with Vision, visits Agatha Harkness to see what she can do for Wonder Man, but she is kidnapped by Nicholas Scratch and the Salem's Seven. She calls the rest of the Avengers to help her, but they are busy fighting the Grim Reaper who attacks in retaliation for what happened to his brother Wonder Man. Because of this, Scarlet Witch and Vision will have to rescue her without them.
| 12 | "Earth and Fire: Part 1" | Steven Melching | February 19, 2000 |
Following Scarlet Witch successfully restoring Wonder Man to good health, something is dangerously affecting the Earth's magnetic fields. Wasp realizes that her father's old business partner Cornelius Van Lundt is behind the disruptions, and must face her past to save the planet.
| 13 | "Earth and Fire: Part 2" | Jan Strnad | February 26, 2000 |
Someone wants an ancient meteorite buried beneath an island, the reason for the disruptions in the Earth's magnetic fields. The Avengers have a final showdown with the Zodiac.

== Home media ==
=== United Kingdom ===
In May 2004, Maximum Entertainment released two boxsets which contained the show as well as segments from The Marvel Super Heroes. Both box sets made up all thirteen episodes of the series. On May 21, 2007, the company re-released the series as a standalone DVD release.

On April 16, 2012, Clear Vision re-released the series on DVD as a two-disc set.

== Merchandise and media ==
=== Toys ===
Toy Biz released a line of action figures for the cartoon series. The figures included Ant-Man, Captain America, Falcon, Hawkeye, Kang, Tigra, Vision, Ultron, Wasp and Wonder Man. Air Glider and Sky Cycle vehicle toys were also produced. In the promotional images of the series, and the action figure photos, Hawkeye did not wear a mask. However, in the series and the final version of the figure, he wore a mask similar to that he wore during the Avengers: The Crossing storyline.

=== Comic book ===
The Avengers: United They Stand
- cover of The Avengers: United They Stand No. 4

Publication information
- Publisher: Marvel Comics
- Format: Ongoing series
- Publication date: November 1999 – June 2000
- No. of issues: 7
- Main character: Avengers

Creative team
- Written by: Ty Templeton; Derec Aucoin

The Avengers: United They Stand comic book series by Ty Templeton and Derec Aucoin was published to accompany the series. Due to low sales it lasted only seven issues.

The first two issues are set before the series premiere, Avengers Assemble, Part 1 & 2. No. 1 has the Avengers injured by an early version of Ultron. This issue was used to explain the armor worn by Hawkeye, Wasp and the Falcon in the series, which uses Pym Particles to reduce the pain caused by injury. It is mentioned by Hawkeye that Hank built his own armor after his legs were broken by Dragon Man, and felt no pain in his legs until he removed the armor. No. 3 takes place after the premiere as the Vision is being interviewed about his membership. He is also briefed on how Wonder Man and Hawkeye joined the team.

The Black Panther would appear in No. 1 and 6–7 of the series. In No. 1 he is among the Avengers who are injured by Ultron. Because of that, he refuses to rejoin the team until Hank steps down from being leader. Captain America appears in #6–7 as well. Quicksilver is mentioned twice in the series. In issue 1, Wanda is shown writing a letter to him. Issue 3 shows him in the flashback alongside Captain America, Hawkeye and Scarlet Witch.
