= Taurus (Marvel Comics) =

Taurus is the name of several characters appearing in American comic books published by Marvel Comics.

== Publication history ==
The Cornelius Van Lunt incarnation of Taurus first appeared in Avengers #72 (January 1970), and was created by Roy Thomas and Sal Buscema.

== Fictional character biography ==
=== Cornelius Van Lunt ===
Taurus

Publication information
- Publisher: Marvel Comics
- First appearance: Avengers #72 (Jan 1970)
- Created by: Roy Thomas; Sal Buscema

In-story information
- Alter ego: Cornelius Van Lunt
- Team affiliations: Zodiac; Great Wheel
- Abilities: Genius-level intellect Charging attack

Cornelius Van Lunt is a multimillionaire businessman and professional criminal mastermind. He is also the founder and financier of the original Zodiac cartel, of which he chose the eleven other leaders. Van Lunt later succeeds Marcus Lassiter (the original Aries) as Zodiac's leader. In Zodiac's first mission, Taurus and Zodiac were summoned by Nick Fury (disguised as Scorpio). Taurus battled the Avengers and then escaped.

Zodiac schemes to kill all New York residents born under the sign of Gemini with the Star-Blazer weapon, but are foiled by the Avengers. Taurus defeats a rebellion within Zodiac, but he is captured by the Avengers along with all the other Zodiac leaders, and his secret identity is exposed. While jailed, Taurus allows the Avengers to use the Star-Blazer against the Star-Stalker.

Taurus attempts to compete against the Maggia, who send the Taurus of the android Zodiac to wreck his headquarters. He hires Iron Man (James Rhodes), who defeats the android Taurus. Van Lunt deduces Iron Man to be Rhodes and sends Aries and Aquarius in an unsuccessful attempt to assassinate him.

Taurus witnesses the massacre of all the other human Zodiac leaders by Scorpio's android Zodiac. He aids the West Coast Avengers in defeating the android Zodiac, escapes, and attempts to enlist Shroud in a new Zodiac. Taurus is killed in a plane crash outside Los Angeles following a battle with Moon Knight.

=== Android Taurus ===
Scorpio (Jake Fury) constructed the android Zodiac members, although his plan was thwarted by the Defenders.

The Maggia employs the android Taurus to wreck the human Taurus's headquarters; the android Taurus is defeated by Iron Man. Quicksilver employs the android Zodiac to attack the West Coast Avengers, but the Avengers defeats Zodiac.

Led by Scorpio in a new android body, the android Zodiac kills the human Zodiac and takes over their criminal operations. They battle the West Coast Avengers, but are rendered inert after being transported to the dimension of the Brotherhood of the Ankh.

=== Ecliptic Taurus ===
The Ecliptic Taurus is a humanoid bull who Scorpio freed from Ryker's Island. He and the rest of Zodiac are later killed by Weapon X.

=== Thanos' Taurus ===
The fourth Taurus is an unnamed man and a member of Thanos' incarnation of Zodiac. He and the other Zodiac members are killed when Thanos abandons them on the self-destructing Helicarrier, with Cancer being the only survivor.

== Powers and abilities ==
Taurus wore a costume that he designed, of synthetic stretch fabric and leather, reinforced with kevlar. The costume came with an armored helmet with horns constructed of an unknown hard material, making them formidable weapons. His personal fighting style involved bull-like charges at opponents with his lowered horns. He also controls Zodiac's "Star-Blazer" energy weapons invented by Darren Bentley; these included the Star-Blazer handgun which fired intense blasts of stellar energy, and the Star-Blazer cannon which was a larger, more powerful version of the handgun. Cornelius van Lunt was a normal human with no superhuman powers. He had a degree in business administration and was a skilled businessman, organizer, and strategist. He was also an amateur astrologer with extensive knowledge of astrology.

In its original form, the android Taurus had retractable horns mounted on its arms and attached to cables so that it can be fired at opponents. It also possessed internal sensors enabling it to detect heat. In its second form, the android Taurus had enhanced strength and was immune to energy blasts.

The Ecliptic version of Taurus had superhuman strength and carried the Zodiac teleportation device.

Thanos' Taurus wears a special suit given to him by Thanos which enables him to possess super-strength and transform into a Minotaur-like form.

== In other media ==
- Taurus appears in The Avengers: United They Stand, voiced by Gerry Mendicino. This version is a Minotaur-like alien and the leader of Zodiac who can assume a human form with the alias of Cornelius van Lunt.
- Taurus appears in the Marvel Anime: Iron Man episode "A Twist of Memory, a Turn of the Mind". This version is a large bull-like mech utilized by Zodiac.
- Taurus-inspired foot soldiers appear in Ultimate Spider-Man with one soldier voiced by Chi McBride. They appear as members of Zodiac and wear cattle-like masks.
