= John King (comics) =

Publication information
- Publisher: Marvel Comics
- First appearance: The Hood #1 (July 2002)
- Created by: Brian K. Vaughan; Kyle Hotz

In-story information
- Alter ego: John King
- Team affiliations: Zodiac
- Notable aliases: Cancer
- Abilities: Cancer super-suit grants: Transformation into a humanoid crab

John King is a fictional character appearing in American comic books published by Marvel Comics. He is the cousin of Parker Robbins, the supervillain known as "the Hood".

Manny Montana portrayed the character in the Marvel Cinematic Universe (MCU) series Ironheart (2025).

== Publication history ==
John King first appeared in the MAX limited series The Hood in 2002, and was created by writer Brian K. Vaughan and artist Kyle Hotz. After a five-year hiatus, he reappeared in the New Avengers miniseries The Trust, and also appeared in the fourth issue of Secret Invasion. He was a recurring character in the Dark Reign: The Hood series, which began in 2009, and appeared in The Siege: Storming Asgard miniseries.

== Fictional character biography ==
John King is the cousin of Parker Robbins (who would later become the Hood). King and Robbins are close friends and both work as criminals in New York City. The two attempt to raid a warehouse said to be housing a valuable cargo, where the demon Nisanti attacks King. Robbins seemingly kills Nisanti and takes its cloak and boots, giving him magical powers. Robbins and King later attempt to intercept a diamond heist, during which Robbins accidentally shoots a police officer. King takes the blame for the incident and is taken into custody. Robbins frames Madame Rapier for shooting the police officer, which allows King to be set free.

Following the "Civil War" storyline, the Hood assembles a crime syndicate to take advantage of the discord caused by the Superhuman Registration Act. King attends an auction held by Owl and attempts to auction off a Deathlok replica until Hood attacks the auction and apparently kills Owl. King later tells the syndicate of his plans to use the Deathlok replica to help him rob a bank. He succeeds, but is captured by the New Avengers shortly afterward when they raid his hideout.

During the Dark Reign storyline, John King becomes the Hood's lieutenant. King is arrested by Force and the authorities, who have learned that he is working with the Hood. However, Hood has Norman Osborn bail out King and the other villains. King carries out another heist for the Hood, this time giving instructions to Squid and Man-Fish to raid a cargo ship. King later tells Hood about the Controller sowing discord amongst his villain allies.

John King is approached by Thanos to join his incarnation of Zodiac, leading the team as Cancer. The Zodiac is tasked with stealing several powerful items to bring balance to Earth and the cosmos. Captured after a battle with the Avengers and after the death of most of his teammates, King was told by Captain America during interrogation that most of the dead Zodiac members were merely lackeys for other villains like he was to Hood. King reveals Thanos's plan to them.

== Powers and abilities ==
John King possesses no superhuman powers or abilities.

As Cancer, King wears a special super-suit given to him by Thanos that gives him the appearance of a humanoid crab.

== In other media ==
John King appears in Ironheart, portrayed by Manny Montana. This version is a member of a Chicago street crew led by his cousin, the Hood. During a heist at the Heirlum agricultural facility, King finds out about Riri Williams investigating Stuart Clarke's death and attacks her. Williams leaves him to suffocate as the room fills with carbon monoxide.
