= Helicarrier =

Fictional flying aircraft carrier in Marvel

S.H.I.E.L.D. Helicarrier
- The Helicarrier as depicted in Avengers vs. X-Men #1 (April 2012). Art by John Romita Jr.

Publication information
- Publisher: Marvel Comics
- First appearance: Strange Tales #135 (August 1965)
- Created by: Stan Lee; Jack Kirby

In story information
- Type: Airborne aircraft carrier
- Element of stories featuring: S.H.I.E.L.D.

The Helicarrier is a fictional airborne aircraft carrier appearing in American comic books published by Marvel Comics. Created by Stan Lee and Jack Kirby, the aircraft first appeared in Strange Tales #135 (August 1965).

The Helicarrier is depicted as the crucial mobile command center, forward operations platform, and capital ship of the fictional intelligence/defense agency S.H.I.E.L.D. It has survived multiple redesigns while rarely straying from its originally depicted role as a mobile headquarters of S.H.I.E.L.D. until recent years.

== Fictional history ==
The original design of the Helicarrier is attributed to a co-operative effort by Tony Stark, Forge, and Reed Richards. The first Helicarrier was proposed by Stark Industries as a political compromise among the signatories of the treaty in response to fears that any nation hosting the Directorate's main headquarters would be subject to attack by organizations such as Hydra, with domestic political fallout sure to follow immediately thereafter.

After Iron Man replaces Maria Hill as director of S.H.I.E.L.D., he designs a new class of Helicarrier with a red and gold design resembling the Iron Man armor. This Helicarrier is severely damaged by the Red Hulk and subsequently commandeered by the Intelligencia, who rename it the Hellcarrier.

S.H.I.E.L.D.'s replacement agency, H.A.M.M.E.R., decommissioned the surviving Helicarriers, with three of them — including the Iliad and the Argonaut — being stolen by Nick Fury. H.A.M.M.E.R. subsequently commissions at least one new carrier to Norman Osborn's specifications, which is destroyed during the Siege of Asgard.

== Reception ==
=== Critical response ===
Jamie Lovett of ComicBook.com referred to the Helicarrier as one of "Marvel's most iconic vehicles." George Marston of Newsarama included the Helicarrier in their "Best Superhero Headquarters And Hideouts Of All Time" list, calling it one of the "very coolest, most iconic, and ultimate best superhero headquarters in comic books." Sam Scott of Looper included the Helicarrier in their "Coolest Superhero Hideouts In Marvel History" list, writing, "Jack Kirby came up with more wild ideas in his career than most of us could in 12 lifetimes, and if there was one thing he loved dreaming up, it was huge, outlandish vehicles. None of them were huger, more outlandish, or more iconic than the S.H.I.E.L.D. Helicarrier." Brad Hill of Sportskeeda included the Helicarrier in their "10 Best Vehicles In Comic Books" list, saying, "Another iconic vehicle within the Marvel universe, which became even more iconic after the first Avengers movie, is the Helicarrier."

Comic Book Resources ranked the Helicarrier 3rd in their "10 Coolest Vehicles In Marvel Comics" list, 6th in their "10 Best Vehicles In The Marvel Universe" list, 7th in their "10 Most Important Vehicles In The Marvel Universe" list, and 10th in their "10 Most Iconic Superhero Hideouts In Marvel Comics" list. Casey Haney of Screen Rant ranked the Helicarrier 7th in their "16 Best Superhero Vehicles" list.

== Other versions ==
Alternate versions of the Helicarrier appear in the Ultimate Marvel universe. The engines that keep the carrier aloft were designed by Tony Stark and were modular enough to be used in a space shuttle by the Fantastic Four. In Ultimate Avengers Vs New Ultimates #4, it is revealed that Hank Pym designed the Helicarriers.

== In other media ==
=== Marvel Cinematic Universe ===
The Helicarrier as depicted in Marvel's The Avengers

The Helicarrier appears in media set in the Marvel Cinematic Universe (MCU). It is based on the Ultimate Marvel incarnation of the vehicle and has stacked carrier decks and optical camouflage capabilities.

- The Helicarrier shown in The Avengers (2012) has two stacked carrier decks and optical camouflage capabilities. The Helicarrier was designed by Nathan Schroeder and modeled and animated by Industrial Light & Magic.
- In Captain America: The Winter Soldier (2014), Hydra utilizes three Helicarriers as part of Project Insight, linking the Helicarriers to spy satellites in a bid to kill everyone deemed as a threat to the organization. These Helicarriers feature several improvements from the one seen in The Avengers, most notably the addition of battleship-sized guns and repulsor engines designed by Tony Stark. All three Helicarriers are destroyed when Steve Rogers, Sam Wilson, and Maria Hill reprogram their targeting systems to fire on each other.
- In Avengers: Age of Ultron (2015), S.H.I.E.L.D. uses the original Helicarrier to evacuate Sokovia.
- The original Helicarrier appears in the Agents of S.H.I.E.L.D. episode "Scars". Prior to the events of Age of Ultron, Phil Coulson and Nick Fury discovered that the Helicarrier survived Hydra's attack and secretly repaired it for emergency usage.
- An alternate version of the Helicarrier appears in the Loki episode "Journey into Mystery". This version is located in the Void at the End of Time and bears a Hydra logo.

=== Television ===
- The Helicarrier appears in the Spider-Man and His Amazing Friends episode "Mission: Save the Guardstar".
- The Helicarrier appears in Spider-Man: The Animated Series. Besides being the S.H.I.E.L.D. headquarters, it also served as a prison for high-risk individuals, such as Chameleon. It is later destroyed by Electro.
- The Helicarrier appears in the X-Men: Evolution episode "Ascension".
- The Helicarrier appears in The Super Hero Squad Show, and serves as the base of operations for the Super Hero Squad. It is usually piloted by Ms. Marvel, who reluctantly allowed the Squad to use it.
- The Helicarrier appears in the Iron Man: Armored Adventures episode "Technovore".
- Helicarriers appear in The Avengers: Earth's Mightiest Heroes.
- The Helicarrier appears in Ultimate Spider-Man (2012). In the first season, it serves as a headquarters and home for Spider-Man's team, as well as a prison, before being destroyed by the Green Goblin. In the second season, the Helicarrier is rebuilt as the more versatile Tri-Carrier, which can divide into three ships: the central Strato-Carrier, the space-based Astro-Carrier, and the water-based Aqua-Carrier. In the fourth season, Swarm converts the Tri-Carrier into Hydra Island, which is destroyed by the Scarlet Spider.
- The Tri-Carrier appears in Avengers Assemble.
- The Tri-Carrier appears in the Hulk and the Agents of S.M.A.S.H. episode, "The Dopplesmashers".

=== Film ===
- The Helicarrier appears in Nick Fury: Agent of S.H.I.E.L.D.
- Several Helicarriers appear in Ultimate Avengers.
- The Helicarrier appears in Iron Man: Rise of Technovore.
- The Helicarrier appears in Avengers Confidential: Black Widow & Punisher.
- A decommissioned Helicarrier appears in 20th Century Fox's Deadpool (2016). It is not identified onscreen due to rights issues between Marvel and Fox.

=== Video games ===
- The Helicarrier appears in Marvel: Ultimate Alliance.
- The Helicarrier appears in Ultimate Spider-Man (2005).
- The Helicarrier appears in Spider-Man: Friend or Foe.
- The Helicarrier appears in Spider-Man: Web of Shadows.
- The Helicarrier appears in Marvel: Ultimate Alliance 2.
- The Helicarrier appears in Spider-Man: Shattered Dimensions.
- The Helicarrier appears in Iron Man 2.
- The Helicarrier appears as a stage in Marvel vs. Capcom 3: Fate of Two Worlds.
- The Helicarrier appears in Marvel: Avengers Alliance.
- The Helicarrier appears in Lego Marvel Super Heroes.
- The Helicarrier appears in Lego Marvel's Avengers.
- The Helicarrier appears in Lego Marvel Super Heroes 2.
- The Helicarrier appears in Marvel Strike Force.
- The Helicarrier appears in Marvel's Avengers.
- The Helicarrier appears in Iron Man VR. This version was created by Stark Industries and was the last project Tony Stark sold to S.H.I.E.L.D. before he stopped manufacturing weapons.
- The Helicarrier appears in Fortnite.
- The Helicarrier appears in Marvel Snap.

=== Miscellaneous ===
A futuristic incarnation of the Helicarrier called the Levicarrier appears in the graphic novel Crash.

== See also ==
- Airborne aircraft carrier
- Cloudbase
- Fictional airborne aircraft carriers
- Sky Captain and the World of Tomorrow
