= Nick Fury, Agent of Nothing =

- Cover to the trade paperback.
- Publisher: Marvel Comics
- Publication date: April – September 2009
- Genre: Spy, superhero, war
- Title(s): Secret Warriors; Dark Reign
- Main character(s): Nick Fury; Team White; Daisy Johnson; Alexander Aaron; Yo-Yo Rodriguez; J.T. Slade; Jerry Sledge; Eden Fesi

Creative team
- Writer(s): Brian Michael Bendis; Jonathan Hickman
- Artist: Stefano Caselli
- Penciller: Stefano Caselli
- Inker: Stefano Caselli
- Letterer: David 'Dave' Lanphear
- Colorist: Daniele Rudoni
- Editor(s): Mark D. Beazley; Tom Brevoort; John Denning; Jennifer Grünwald; Joe Quesada; Jeanine Schaefer; Alex Starbuck; Jeff Youngquist
- Nick Fury, Agent of Nothing: ISBN 0-7851-3999-0

Nick Fury, Agent of Nothing is a story arc in the Marvel Comics series Secret Warriors. It was the first story arc in the Secret Warriors series.

== Publication history ==
The storyline was written by Brian Michael Bendis and Jonathan Hickman.

1. Nick Fury, Agent of Nothing: Part 1, April 2009
2. Nick Fury, Agent of Nothing: Part 2, May 2009
3. Nick Fury, Agent of Nothing: Part 3, June 2009
4. Nick Fury, Agent of Nothing: Part 4, July 2009
5. Nick Fury, Agent of Nothing: Part 5, August 2009
6. Nick Fury, Agent of Nothing: Part 6, September 2009

== Plot ==
Nick Fury, suspicious of the current state of affairs following the dismantling of S.H.I.E.L.D., breaks into the Carousel, a S.H.I.E.L.D. base in Chicago. Information found there leads him to send the Secret Warriors to recon the Black Ice facility in Odessa, Texas, where they break cover and battle both H.A.M.M.E.R. and Hydra forces. The Hydra agents manage to escape and steal a casket containing the remains of Gorgon. The fact that Hydra showed up prompts Fury to announce to his team that S.H.I.E.L.D. was evidently working under the control of Hydra all along.

Meanwhile, in the Ichor Hydra base, a Skrull attack leads Baron Strucker to destroy the base and regroup the leadership of Hydra: Kraken (actually Jake Fury, Nick Fury's younger brother), Viper, Madame Hydra, and Hive. Hydra forces bring the remains of Gorgon to the Hand and force the assassin clan to resurrect Gorgon, killing the Hand Grandmaster in the process.

The Secret Warriors are sent to evacuate some psi-agents from the Red Worm S.H.I.E.L.D. base but are again confronted by Hydra. Gorgon cuts off Slingshot's arms during the fight and Hydra leave with the captive agents. The Secret Warriors seek out a replacement for Slingshot and find Eden Fesi - a teleporter living in Australia. Fury assembles an army that attacks the Dock - a S.H.I.E.L.D. base under H.A.M.M.E.R. control. During the battle with H.A.M.M.E.R., Hydra forces again show up, and the Secret Warriors are called to the rescue, allowing Fury to escape.

Following this event, Madame Hydra and Viper bargain with Silver Samurai and obtain a mysterious box from Clan Yashida. Kraken orders Hydra to scan all members for a traitor in their ranks. Fury instructs Dum Dum Dugan to start recruiting an army. He reveals to the Secret Warriors that he was not the one who called for their aid in the battle.

== Followups ==
The arc was followed by four others Wake the Beast, The Last Ride of the Howling Commandos, Night and Wheels Within Wheels before the series ended.

== Reception ==
According to Kevin M. Brettauer of PopMatters the revelation that Hydra has been in control of S.H.I.E.L.D. all along caused a great deal of controversy among comic book fans. Brettauer himself stated that it should not have come to too much of a surprise considering the earlier similar occurrences in the Nick Fury vs. S.H.I.E.L.D. from the 1980s. He gave the story a good review and said that it is fitting in the aftermath of 9/11 in the same vein as the modern Daniel Craig series and the Bourne films. He also expressed that the artwork by Stefano Caselli, is grim and gritty yet somehow tinged with hope in his opinion.

== Collected editions ==
Title	Material collected	Publication date	ISBN
Secret Warriors: Volume 1: Nick Fury, Agent of Nothing	Secret Warriors #1-6 and Dark Reign: New Nation	HC: September 2009; SC: December 2009	HC: 0-7851-3999-0; SC: 0-7851-3864-1

== See also ==
- 2009 in comics
