= Secret Warriors (comic book) =

Title of two Marvel Comics series

Publication information
- Publisher: Marvel Comics
- Schedule: Monthly
- Format: First series Ongoing; Second series Ongoing
- Genre: Superhero
- Publication date: First series 2009 – 2011; Second series 2017 – 2018
- No. of issues: First series 28; Second series 12
- Main character(s): Several; Nick Fury; Daisy Johnson; Yo-Yo Rodriguez; Jerry Sledge; Eden Fesi; Sebastian Druid; J.T. Slade; Alexander Aaron; Kamala Khan; Lunella Lafayette; Devil Dinosaur; Dante Pertuz; Karnak

Secret Warriors is a Marvel Comics title. The title has been used for two comic book series focusing on two separate teams of young superpowered characters.

== Publication history ==
=== 2009 series ===
The original team which was featured in the first Secret Warriors series was created by Brian Michael Bendis and Alex Maleev in Mighty Avengers #13, and debuted as a team in Secret Invasion #3, both published in 2008 and then featured in their own ongoing series. This series was co-plotted by Bendis with Jonathan Hickman writing. and was one of the titles launching as part of the Dark Reign storyline. The series was promoted by a series of passwords and clues given in solicitations for upcoming issues. A Marvel spokesman stated that further passwords would be released for the website later on.

=== 2017 series ===
In November 2016 Marvel announced that there would be a new incarnation of the series featuring a new young cast of heroes. The new team consists of Kamala Khan, Lunella Lafayette, Devil Dinosaur, Inferno, Karnak and Quake. The first issue was released on May 10, 2017.

In December 2017 it was announced that the current run of Secret Warriors would be cancelled after its 12th issue. This outcome was foreshadowed in the comic itself, by the last panel on the final page of issue #12: as Karnak rides off into the night upon Devil Dinosaur, the issue closes with the inscription “The Secret Warriors will return... Someday. Maybe. I don't know.”

== Collected editions ==
The first series has been collected into individual volumes:

- Secret Warriors:
  - Volume 1: Nick Fury, Agent of Nothing (collects Secret Warriors #1-6 and Dark Reign New Nation, 152 pages, hardcover, September 2009, ISBN 0-7851-3999-0, softcover, December 2009, ISBN 0-7851-3864-1)
  - Volume 2: God of Fear, God of War (collects Secret Warriors #7-10 and Dark Reign: The List – Secret Warriors, 144 pages, hardcover, February 2010, ISBN 0-7851-4306-8, softcover, May 2010, ISBN 0-7851-3865-X)
  - Volume 3: Wake the Beast (collects Secret Warriors #11-16, 144 pages, hardcover, August 2010, ISBN 0-7851-4757-8, softcover, January 2011, ISBN 0-7851-4758-6)
  - Volume 4: Last Ride of the Howling Commandos (collects Secret Warriors #17-19 and Siege: Secret Warriors, hardcover, 112 pages, November 2010, ISBN 0-7851-4759-4, softcover, April 2011, ISBN 0-7851-4760-8)
  - Volume 5: Night (collects Secret Warriors #20-24, hardcover, 144 pages, June 2011, ISBN 0-7851-4802-7)
  - Volume 6: Wheels within Wheels (collects Secret Warriors #25-28, hardcover, 112 pages, September 2011, ISBN 0-7851-5814-6)
- Secret Warriors Omnibus (collects Mighty Avengers #13, 18; Secret Warriors #1-28; Dark Reign The List-Secret Warriors; Siege: Secret Warriors and Dark Reign: New Nation, 904 pages, hardcover, July 2012, ISBN 0-7851-6333-6)
- Secret Warriors: The Complete Collection Volume 1 (paperback) (collects Secret Warriors #1-16, Dark Reign: The List – Secret Warriors, material from Dark Reign: New Nation) ISBN 0-7851-9763-X
- Secret Warriors: The Complete Collection Volume 2 (paperback) (collects Secret Warriors #17-28, Siege: Secret Warriors) ISBN 0-7851-9764-8
