= Yo-Yo Rodriguez =

- Yo-Yo Rodriguez (center) and Stonewall (right) being attacked by Hive on the cover of Secret Warriors #12 (January 2010). Art by Jim Cheung.

Publication information
- Publisher: Marvel Comics
- First appearance: The Mighty Avengers #13 (July 2008)
- Created by: Brian Michael Bendis; Alex Maleev

In-story information
- Species: Human mutate cyborg
- Team affiliations: S.H.I.E.L.D. Secret Warriors
- Notable aliases: Slingshot
- Abilities: Superhuman speed

Yo-Yo Rodriguez (also known as Slingshot) is a superhero appearing in American comic books published by Marvel Comics. Created by writer Brian Michael Bendis and artist Alex Maleev, the character first appeared in The Mighty Avengers #13 (July 2008). She has a form of super speed which, when used, returns her to the place she started. She was a member of Nick Fury's Secret Warriors team. She is the daughter of supervillain Johnny Horton.

Yo-Yo Rodriguez was portrayed by Natalia Cordova-Buckley in the Marvel Cinematic Universe TV series Agents of S.H.I.E.L.D.. In this version she was reimagined as an Inhuman.

== Publication history ==
Yo-Yo Rodriguez first appeared in The Mighty Avengers #13 (July 2008) and was created by writer Brian Michael Bendis and artist Alex Maleev. Born in Puerto Rico, she is the daughter of the supervillain John "Johnny" Horton. Through her father's mutated DNA, she gained superhuman speed and the ability to snap back to the exact same spot she started running. Following the Secret Invasion event, taking on the name Slingshot, she was one of the members of Nick Fury's black-ops team called the Secret Warriors, which was written by Bendis and Jonathan Hickman. During this run, both her arms were cut off by Hydra member Gorgon, and were later replaced with prosthetics.

== Fictional character biography ==
Yo-Yo Rodriguez is the Puerto Rican daughter of the villain Griffin. She gained superhuman speed due to her father's mutated DNA.

Rodriguez was recruited by Nick Fury to join his anti-Skrull task force during the "Secret Invasion" storyline. This team becomes known as the Secret Warriors.

Both of her arms were severed by Gorgon and she was temporarily unable to remain active with the team. Both arms are later replaced with prosthetics. With her new arms, she returns to active duty.

== Powers and abilities ==
Slingshot can run at superhuman speed and bounces back to the point where she began. She has been trained by Nick Fury in espionage, hand-to-hand combat, and firearms. Her primary weapon is a bo staff.

== Reception ==
=== Accolades ===
- In 2018, CBR.com ranked Slingshot 21st in their "25 Fastest Characters In The Marvel Universe" list.
- In 2020, Scary Mommy included Slingshot in their "Looking For A Role Model? These 195+ Marvel Female Characters Are Truly Heroic" list.
- In 2022, CBR.com ranked Slingshot 5th in their "10 Fastest Marvel Sidekicks" list and 18th in their "Marvel: The 20 Fastest Speedsters" list.

== In other media ==
=== Television ===
Yo-Yo Rodríguez, played by Natalia Cordova-Buckley in Agents of S.H.I.E.L.D..

- Elena Rodriguez appears in Agents of S.H.I.E.L.D., portrayed by Natalia Cordova-Buckley. This version is a street-wise Colombian Inhuman whose abilities last the duration of one heartbeat. Rodriguez grows close to Mack, who nicknames her "Yo-Yo" due to her powers, and eventually agrees to join S.H.I.E.L.D. to help them fight Hive's forces. In the fifth season, Ruby Hale slices off Rodriguez's forearms, but Rodriguez survives and eventually receives prosthetics developed by Leo Fitz. In the seventh season, Rodriguez realizes that she has been holding herself back and gains the ability to move at full speed without snapping back to where she started.
- Cordova-Buckley reprises her role in Agents of S.H.I.E.L.D.: Slingshot.
