= Alexander Pierce =

Marvel Comics character

- Alexander Pierce as depicted in Secret Warriors #12 (January 2010). Art by Stefano Caselli.

Publication information
- Publisher: Marvel Comics
- First appearance: Nick Fury vs. S.H.I.E.L.D. #3 (August 1988)
- Created by: Bob Harras (writer); Paul Neary (artist)

In-story information
- Team affiliations: S.H.I.E.L.D. Secret Warriors
- Notable aliases: Anthony Duranti

Alexander Goodwin Pierce is a fictional character appearing in American comic books published by Marvel Comics. He primarily appears as a supporting character in stories featuring the espionage agency S.H.I.E.L.D., of which he is an agent.

A re-imagining of the character was portrayed by Robert Redford in the Marvel Cinematic Universe films Captain America: The Winter Soldier (2014) and Avengers: Endgame (2019).

== Publication history ==
The character, created by Bob Harras and Paul Neary, first appeared in Nick Fury vs. S.H.I.E.L.D. #3 (August 1988).

== Fictional character biography ==
Alexander Pierce was born on Long Island, New York, and majored at S.H.I.E.L.D. Academy in civilian surveillance, and serves in the Philadelphia Accounting Department before becoming a sleeper agent working in decoding dispatches from Hydra. After escaping death in an ambush at Hydra's Hong Kong base, Pierce accompanies Nick Fury to the Himalayas, along with their prisoner Madame Hydra. The group is seized by robotic duplicates called "Deltites" and brought to S.H.I.E.L.D.'s orbiting satellite. Aided by Madame Hydra, Pierce and a group of S.H.I.E.L.D. agents escape and take part in a battle that leads to the Deltites' destruction.

Following the disbanding of S.H.I.E.L.D., Pierce serves as caretaker of the S.H.I.E.L.D. skyscraper that once served as its headquarters. He is then contacted for help by Nick Fury and aids him in vanquishing the Death's Head Squad. He has since joined the new version of S.H.I.E.L.D. organized by Fury.

Pierce later appears as the Secret Warriors' leader following the events of "Secret War". Pierce is given command of Team Black, consisting of dangerous and unruly young superhumans. The team is ordered to gather intelligence on Hydra. Pierce brings his team in for a joint attack with the Howling Commandos on Hell's Heaven, a stronghold in China. The mission is successful, but after the team leaves, they are attacked by Hydra. Pierce and his team survive and are folded into a S.H.I.E.L.D. team run by Daisy Johnson.

== Other versions ==
An alternate universe version of Alexander Pierce makes a minor appearance in Mutant X.

== In other media ==
=== Television ===
Alexander Pierce appears in Nick Fury: Agent of S.H.I.E.L.D., portrayed by Neil Roberts. This version is a British recruit who is assigned to work with Nick Fury following their exile from S.H.I.E.L.D.

=== Film ===
Robert Redford portrays Alexander Pierce in films set in the Marvel Cinematic Universe. This version is the secretary of the World Security Council, Nick Fury's close friend, director of a Hydra cell within S.H.I.E.L.D., and the Winter Soldier's handler.

- Pierce is introduced in Captain America: The Winter Soldier (2014). He masterminds Project Insight ostensibly to recognize and apprehend criminals and terrorists using Helicarriers, but in actuality plans to kill citizens whom Arnim Zola recognizes as a threat to Hydra to force the world into submission. When Pierce learns of Fury's investigation into Project Insight's confidential files, he dispatches the Winter Soldier to eliminate Fury and Steve Rogers. However, he is foiled by Rogers, Natasha Romanoff, Sam Wilson, Fury, and S.H.I.E.L.D. loyalists before Fury kills him.
- An alternate timeline version of Pierce makes a cameo appearance in Avengers: Endgame (2019).
