= John Garrett (comics) =

- John Garrett as depicted in Secret Warriors #7 (August 2009). Art by Alessandro Vitti (penciller/inker) and Sunny Gho (colorist).

Publication information
- Publisher: Marvel Comics
- First appearance: Elektra: Assassin #2 (September 1986)
- Created by: Frank Miller (writer); Bill Sienkiewicz (artist)

In-story information
- Alter ego: John Garrett
- Species: Human cyborg
- Team affiliations: S.H.I.E.L.D.
- Abilities: Skilled marksman

John Garrett is a character appearing in American comic books published by Marvel Comics.

The character appears in the Marvel Cinematic Universe TV series Agents of S.H.I.E.L.D., portrayed by Bill Paxton in season one and James Paxton in season seven.

== Publication history ==
John Garrett first appeared in Elektra: Assassin #2 (September 1986), and was created by Frank Miller and Bill Sienkiewicz.

== Fictional character biography ==
John Garrett previously worked for the CIA and went through special covert training. In 1961, Leonardo da Vinci invited Garrett to be a member of the Great Wheel. Leonardo sent Garrett, Vasili Dassiev, Shoji Soma, and Daniel Whitehall to Giza to acquire a power source from a Brood vessel after destroying the Brood inside.

After being sent to prison several times, Garrett is recruited to work for S.H.I.E.L.D. while his criminal records mysteriously vanish. He serves in Libya with agent Chastity McBryde. McBryde discovers that there are no records of Garrett, but is swiftly transferred to deal with a case in Venezuela, resulting in her complaint not reaching Nick Fury.

At some point in time, Garrett is equipped with a cybernetic right hand. Three years after the Libya mission, Garrett is sent to San Concepcion to investigate the assassination of its president, Carlos Huevos. Garrett confronts Elektra, who causes an explosion that greviously wounds him. Garrett is recovered by ExTechOp and converted into a cyborg, leaving 80% of his body mechanical.

Garrett later returns to S.H.I.E.L.D. under the supervision of Nick Fury and Siege. During the Dark Reign storyline, Garrett is shown to have retired. However, he is called back into action by Nick Fury to investigate Seth Water, a former agent of S.H.I.E.L.D. who is suspected of being a double agent. Waters is later discovered to have been a double agent for Leviathan.

== Powers and abilities ==
John Garrett is a trained agent of S.H.I.E.L.D., and a skilled marksman. As a cyborg, approximately 80% of his body is replaced with S.H.I.E.L.D. cybernetics with only his head and a few of his organs still being organic. He has plastic skin and metal alloy bones, with his muscular system consisting of a combination of pneumatics, hydraulics, and internal electrical generators. His cyborg body grants him enhanced strength, durability, and agility.

== Other versions ==
An alternate universe version of John Garrett from Earth-1610 appears in Ultimate Hawkeye #2. This version is a human S.H.I.E.L.D. agent.

== In other media ==
- John Garrett appears in Agents of S.H.I.E.L.D., portrayed by Bill Paxton. This version is a high-level S.H.I.E.L.D. agent and munitions expert and a former cohort of Phil Coulson who works alongside Grant Ward and Melinda May. Garrett is later revealed to be a high-ranking Hydra sleeper agent and Project Centipede's mastermind. Garrett is also the Deathlok program's first test subject and is dying from organ failure. After being rejuvenated with Kree blood, Garrett confronts Coulson, who kills him in battle.
  - A younger alternate timeline version of Garrett, portrayed by James Paxton, is introduced in the season seven episode "Stolen". Nathaniel Malick recruits him after telling him of his future and grants him teleportation powers from the Inhuman Gordon. After Malick leaves him for dead, Garrett sides with S.H.I.E.L.D. and helps them regroup following a Chronicom attack before he is accidentally killed by Victoria Hand, who mistakes him for a threat.
