= Secret Warriors =

Secret Warriors may refer to:

- Secret Warriors (comic book)
  - Secret Warriors (Team White), the original team in Marvel Comics
  - Secret Warriors (2009 series)
  - Secret Warriors (2017 series)
- Marvel Rising: Secret Warriors, a 2018 animated film
