= Druid (comics) =

Druid, in comics, may refer to:

- Druid, the surname of father and son, Marvel Comics characters:
  - Doctor Druid, a Marvel Comics superhero, named Anthony Druid, who featured in a 1995 mini-series called Druid
  - Druid, Doctor Druid's son Sebastian. A member of the third incarnation of the Howling Commandos
- Dredmund the Druid, a Marvel Comics supervillain

== See also ==
- Druid (disambiguation)
