= Quiet War =

Quiet War may refer to:

- Laotian Civil War, the proxy war in the Kingdom of Laos between 1953 and 1975
- The Quiet War, a science fiction novel written by Paul McAuley
- "The Quiet War" (song), a song by The Used from the 2017 album The Canyon

== See also ==
- Silent Weapons for Quiet Wars, 1997 debut album from Wu-Tang affiliate Killarmy
- Secret Wars (disambiguation)
