= Hive (character) =

Publication information
- First appearance: Secret Warriors #2 (May 2009)
- Created by: Brian Michael Bendis; Jonathan Hickman

In-story information
- Full name: Derek
- Team affiliations: Hydra
- Notable aliases: The Death Swooper, Inhuman King, Parasite, The Great Alveus, Hydra God
- Abilities: Invulnerability, Possession, (reanimation)

The Hive Mind, also known simply as Derek, is a supervillain appearing in comic books published by Marvel Comics. Derek was an experiment made to physically embody the ideals of the fictional terrorist group Hydra. The entity is composed of uncounted numbers of genetically engineered parasites.

Derek appeared in the third season of the TV series Agents of S.H.I.E.L.D., where he was an ancient Inhuman and was primarily portrayed by Brett Dalton.

== Publication history ==
Hive first appeared in Secret Warriors #2 (May 2009) and was created by Brian Michael Bendis and Jonathan Hickman.

== Fictional character biography ==
Hive was created in the Hydra laboratories at their home base of Gehenna. An unnamed and unwitting Hydra agent is offered as a host to multiple parasites, around which they could merge into a singular being. Hive has no identity of its own, with its collective will dominating its human host. As a result of its conditioning, Hive is dedicated to the Hydra cause, to the extent that Baron Strucker appoints it as a figurehead for the organization alongside Viper, Gorgon, Kraken, and the new Madame Hydra (Valentina Allegra de Fontaine).

When Hydra goes to war against the rival organization Leviathan, de Fontaine reveals her true allegiance and murders her predecessor, Viper. Hive possesses and resurrects Viper's corpse, with its parasites forming a bulbous mass on her head.

Nick Fury sends a team led by his son Mikel Fury to destroy the Hive Base located in the Indian Ocean. The team is attacked by hundreds of Hydra agents being controlled by Hive itself. The agents are overrun and sacrifice themselves to blow up the base, killing the Hive-possessed agents.

The version of Hive possessing Viper survives. Taking back her title as Madame Hydra, Viper and Gorgon break away from Hydra and form an alliance with Norman Osborn's H.A.M.M.E.R. organization. Osborn arranges for Madame Hydra to have Hive surgically removed from her body.

During the Secret Empire storyline, Madame Hydra recruits Hive into her new Hydra High Council to assist Steve Rogers, who had his history altered to be a Hydra sleeper agent by Kobik.

== Powers and abilities ==
Hive's body consists of a congregation of parasites that can latch away from the mass and attack others at high speed—making them effective projectile weapons. In its united form, Hive is capable of asserting itself as an individual, albeit without name or personality. Hive is capable of breathing both on land and underwater.

While Hive can improve upon the host's strength and skills, it cannot perform impossibilities such as flight if the host cannot. Also, any ailments afflicting the host prior to absorption will still be present and will affect Hive.

== In other media ==
Hive as depicted in Agents of S.H.I.E.L.D.

Hive, also known as Alveus, appears in Agents of S.H.I.E.L.D. This version was originally a Maya warrior (portrayed by Jason Glover) who was captured by Kree Reapers, subjected to Terrigenesis, and turned into an Inhuman. The process transformed his body into a mass of cellular parasites that survive by inhabiting dead human hosts and can control other Inhumans, placing them under his control in a hive mind. The ancient Inhumans used Kree technology to banish Hive to the planet Maveth, with his remaining worshipers establishing a secret society that became the terrorist organization Hydra. Through Hydra's efforts, Hive returns to Earth and possesses Grant Ward. He seizes control of Hydra and recreates the Terrigenesis experiment, spreading a virus that transforms humans into Hive-infected primitive Inhumans. Hive is ultimately defeated and killed through the efforts of S.H.I.E.L.D.
