= Elektra: Assassin =

Comic book featuring the ninja assassin Elektra

- Elektra: Assassin trade paperback cover, published in 2000.

Publication information
- Publisher: Marvel Comics
- Schedule: Monthly
- Format: Limited series
- Genre: Superhero
- Publication date: August 1986 – March 1987
- No. of issues: 8
- Main character: Elektra

Creative team
- Written by: Frank Miller
- Artist: Bill Sienkiewicz
- Letterer: Jim Novak
- Colorist: Bill Sienkiewicz
- Editor(s): Daniel Chichester; Archie Goodwin

Collected editions
- Elektra: Assassin: ISBN 0-87135-309-1
- Elektra by Frank Miller Omnibus: ISBN 0-7851-2777-1

Elektra: Assassin is an eight-issue limited series published by Epic Comics, an imprint of American company Marvel Comics, between August 1986 and March 1987. Written by Frank Miller and illustrated by Bill Sienkiewicz, Elektra: Assassin satirizes ultra-violence, politics, comic book clichés like ninjas and cyborgs, and the portrayal of women.

As with Ronin and Born Again, Miller wrote the series with the full script method.

== Plot ==
The story starts out with Elektra in a mental institution in South America, attempting to recover her memory. The first issue is very disjointed, as Elektra pieces together jumbled memories ranging from the murder of her mother, molestation by her father (which she says is actually an invented memory), to more recent events such as an assassination she carried out. This led her to discover the existence of "The Beast", a monster who controls people by forcing them to drink its mother's milk. At first, the Beast's motives are unclear, but it is gradually revealed that it is attempting to bring about a nuclear war. When its initial plans fail, it launches the presidential campaign of Ken Wind (with a face resembling a grainy Dan Quayle photograph, whose resemblance is a coincidence, according to Sienkiewicz, since it is a Sienkiewicz self-portrait). Wind proves extremely popular, through various platitudes which disguise his evil nature; when Wind takes over, he intends to launch a nuclear attack on the Soviet Union, bringing about mutually assured destruction.

Elektra uses her psychic powers to escape, running afoul of S.H.I.E.L.D. agent John Garrett. Garrett, an alcoholic, feels ashamed and becomes obsessed with Elektra, but she manages to stay one step ahead of him. She traps him in a building which is blown up, and most of his body is destroyed. S.H.I.E.L.D.'s experimental cybernetics division builds him a robotic body and attaches his head. His psychic bond with Elektra continues to grow, and he eventually realizes he is powerless against her. She sets out to stop the Beast, killing various subordinates and several S.H.I.E.L.D. agents in the process. In response, Nick Fury sends Chastity McBryde, a strictly by-the-book mercenary. Perry, a sociopath who was Garrett's former partner, has now also been turned into a cyborg. Chastity learns of Perry's suppressed sociopathic criminal history, and informs Fury, but Perry manages to escape before S.H.I.E.L.D can deactivate him. Perry is extremely dangerous and eventually comes under the service of the Beast.

The Beast manages to get Wind elected president, but Elektra thwarts the plan with her psychic powers and ninja skills. In a final confrontation, Elektra manages to injure the Beast, terminate Perry, and transfer the mind of Garrett into Ken Wind and vice versa before she and Garrett are captured by S.H.I.E.L.D. As Chastity is giving her final report to the President about what happened, it is realized that in the end, Garrett, in the body of Wind, becomes President. Elektra, using her psychic powers yet again, manages to escape S.H.I.E.L.D after she has recovered, by placing her mind in one of the blue helper dwarfs, knocking out Chastity and then releasing her own body.

== Reception ==
Comics writer Garth Ennis is a fan of the series, describing it as "superb" and has stated that Miller's portrayal of Nick Fury in the series inspired his own writing of the character, which he used mainly in his comic Fury: My War Gone By.

== Collected editions ==
The series has been collected in numerous trade paperbacks and hardcover editions, the first one in 1989. New trade paperback editions were also released in 2000, 2012, and 2019.

It was also included in the 2008 hardcover Elektra by Frank Miller Omnibus (ISBN 0785127771).

The March 2012 release was part of the Marvel Premiere Classic hardcovers line.

== Awards ==
- 1988: Nominated for "Best Finite Series" Eisner Award
