= Secret Warriors (Team White) =

Fictional comic book group

Team White
- Nick Fury and Team White. Art by Leinil Francis Yu

Publication information
- Publisher: Marvel Comics
- First appearance: The Mighty Avengers #13 (July 2008)
- Created by: Brian Michael Bendis; Alex Maleev

In-story information
- Type of organization: Team
- Agent(s): Current members Nick Fury; Daisy Johnson; Yo-Yo Rodriguez; Jerry Sledge; Eden Fesi; Former members Sebastian Druid; J.T. Slade; Alexander Aaron

Secret Warriors is an alias for the fictional group Team White created by Nick Fury, a team of superpowered agents appearing in American comic books published by Marvel Comics. The name "secret warriors" also refers to the members of other hidden groups in the comics series Secret Warriors and its related titles. Team White was the main team led by Nick Fury from 2009 to 2011. First appearance was in "The Mighty Avengers" #13 (July 2008).

== Publication history ==
Created by Brian Michael Bendis and Alex Maleev, the characters were introduced in Mighty Avengers #13, and debuted as a team in Secret Invasion #3, both published in 2008.

The team was introduced in the Secret Invasion tie-in issues of Mighty Avengers and then featured in their own ongoing series. This series was co-plotted by Bendis with Jonathan Hickman writing. and was one of the titles launching as part of the Dark Reign storyline. The series was promoted by a series of passwords and clues given in solicitations for upcoming issues. A Marvel spokesman stated that further passwords would be released for the website later on.

== Fictional team biography ==
The Team White enters battle for the first time during the Skrulls' invasion of Earth. Nick Fury's team manages to rescue the combined forces of the Initiative and the Young Avengers from being killed by Skrulls. Fury rallies all the other heroes together with his agents and begins a series of hit and run attacks on the Skrull forces throughout the city. In the immediate aftermath of the heroes' victory, Fury and his agents quickly leave.

During the Dark Reign storyline and the Nick Fury, Agent of Nothing arc, Nick Fury reveals his true intent to bring down Hydra, which has extended its influence into S.H.I.E.L.D. With S.H.I.E.L.D. being replaced by H.A.M.M.E.R., Hydra is moving to claim as many assets as it can before the U.S. government, and the agents knew that Hydra would go after the Red Worm psy-ops facility next. The team needs to get there first to prevent Hydra from claiming such an asset, but are unable to stop Hydra. Yo-Yo Rodriguez is attacked by Gorgon, who cuts off both of her hands.

Daisy Johnson travels to the Australian outback along with Sebastian Druid to meet with Eden Fesi, who was another name on Fury's list of Caterpillars. He readily agrees to join, with Gateway's permission. Fury reaches out to Dum Dum Dugan for help. Dugan and many former S.H.I.E.L.D. agents had gone private in the wake of H.A.M.M.E.R.'s takeover and formed a Howling Commandos private military company.

Fury leads the Howling Commandos on a raid of the Dock, another former S.H.I.E.L.D. base that houses helicarriers. However, Hydra intervenes to prevent Fury from taking the helicarriers. Team White arrives to back Fury up, making the raid on the Dock a success. The Howling Commandos make off with three helicarriers, and Fury recruits 3,000 H.A.M.M.E.R. agents to his side.

Norman Osborn lures J. T. James (Hellfire), Alexander Aaron (Phobos), and Eden Fesi into a trap using Black Widow as bait. Phobos goes in using a Nick Fury Life Model Decoy as a disguise, getting caught in the trap and exposed. James and Fesi come to the rescue, but Ares gives the three the opportunity to get away. Osborn sends Ares, Hawkeye (Bullseye) and agents of H.A.M.M.E.R. after the group. Fesi tries to teleport them back to the secret base, but Ares forces the portal open to allow Osborn's forces to follow. Team White holds off Osborn's forces and escapes through Fesi's portal before the base explodes.

Meanwhile, Fury reaches out to his old friend John Garrett. Together, they con Osborn into helping them uncover an active agent of Leviathan. Hydra and Leviathan quickly go to war, giving Fury extra room and time to maneuver his own forces. Johnson discovers that her team was not the only team of special agents at Fury's disposal. Two others are active and operating outside of Fury's direct control: the Black team run by Alexander Pierce, and the Gray team run by Fury's son Mikel.

During the Siege of Asgard, Fury's agenda is interrupted by Norman Osborn's sudden attack on Asgard. Team White works with the New Avengers and Young Avengers, who come to the defense of the Asgardians. However, Phobos is left out of the battle and sets out on his own mission after learning that his father Ares had been killed by the Sentry. Following the battle, Team White returns to their secret war against Hydra and Leviathan. The group disbands after Phobos and Hellfire are killed.

In 1961, Fury along with his brother Jake, Dum Dum Dugan, John Garrett, Baron Strucker, Shoji Soma of the Hand, Cornelius Van Lunt, Thomas Davidson, and the men who would become Kraken, Magadan and Leviathan's leader, Orion, meet up with a man who calls himself Aries, secretly being Leonardo da Vinci. He assigns each of them a sign of the Zodiac and sends groups of them around the world to gather various artifacts from different locations. Fury's group comes back empty-handed, however, the other artifacts are hooked up to chambers that will empower and rejuvenate people. The group is subsequently betrayed by Magadan and Orion, who take the technology for themselves and create Leviathan. A short time later, Soma and Strucker attack their base, steal one of the artifacts and injure Orion gravely. After giving the artifact to the Yashida clan for safeguarding, Soma is killed by Leviathan.

S.H.I.E.L.D. is soon restarted as a joint effort by the United Nations. Daisy Johnson is chosen to be the first director, with the remnants of Team White, Team Black and the Howling Commandos as her agents.

== Roster ==
Nick Fury
Founder and leader of Team White.
Daisy Johnson
Codename: Quake, the daughter of Mister Hyde. She possesses the power to create earthquake-like vibrations.
Alexander Aaron
Codename: Phobos, son of Ares. He possesses the power to instill fear in others, and has limited precognition. As a member of the Olympian race born of a mortal woman, he has the potential for far greater "god-like" powers not unlike his uncle Hercules, but his "mortal" body must die first. This occurs when he is stabbed through the chest and killed by Gorgon.
Sebastian Druid
Codename: Druid, the son of Doctor Druid who has inherited some of his father's skill with magic. He is soon seen as a liability, and Fury dismisses him from the team. It is later shown that Fury in fact put Druid through "Boot Camp", assigning John Garrett to get him in shape and boost his confidence.
Yo-Yo Rodriguez
Codename: Slingshot, the daughter of the villain Griffin. She can run at superhuman speed and bounces back to the point where she began running. She was recently injured severely, with both of her arms severed by the Gorgon, and was temporarily unable to remain active with the team. However, both arms have now been replaced with technologically advanced prosthetics that afford her some superhuman strength in her hands and she has returned to active duty. During combat she is often seen fighting with a retractable javelin.
J.T. Slade
Codename: Hellfire, born James Taylor Slade, the grandson of the Phantom Rider, is able to charge items (notably a chain) with fire and unleash a devastating attack. During New Avengers, J.T. is shown as one of the possible replacements for the title of Sorcerer Supreme, showing great magical potential. In issue 16, J.T. is discovered to be a double agent with Hydra, directly with Baron Strucker. During the fall of Gehenna, Nick Fury tells J.T. that he knows he is a traitor and lets him fall to his death, avenging Alexander.
Jerry Sledge
Codename: Stonewall, who has been bailed out of jail by Daisy Johnson, where he was being held for hitting a police officer. He possesses superhuman strength and an ability to increase his size, while his skin appears to take an appearance resembling stone. In issue 9, he demonstrated the ability to change the composition of his skin, by turning it into metal after getting Ares' axe swung into his chest. Very little had so far been revealed about the character but, in issue 12, it was revealed that his father is the villain Absorbing Man.
Eden Fesi
A reality warping young man previously under the care and training of the mutant Gateway. Nick Fury initially attempted to recruit him to another one of his "Caterpillar" teams, but Gateway refused. In the Marvel Now! relaunch, Fesi joined the Avengers under the name of Manifold.

== Other "Caterpillar" teams ==
Within the Secret Warriors series the featured team is referred to as being one of three other caterpillar teams. While the main team of the series is led by Daisy and overseen by Nick Fury, Fury also oversees two other teams.

=== Alexander Pierce's Team Black ===
- Alexander Pierce – S.H.I.E.L.D. agent.
- Aaron Downing – In possession of a "Shadow Machine". Both his arms appear to be replaced by technological prosthetics. He has demonstrated the ability to make "shadowlike constructs" extend from his prosthetic hands.
- Lauren Wolfe – A polymorph, the limits of which have yet to be revealed. However, during combat she has been shown to change her hands into spiked mace.
- Ahmed Noor – A living atom smasher; able to disintegrate matter and cause explosions.
- Ben Huth – Only known super power is his ability to fly.
- Bobby Gamorra – Owner of an item referred to as the "Amulet of Abbadon", a mystical artifact that grants him magical powers, which so far have been revealed to include the opening of teleportation portals.
- Cornell Grey – Possess a parasitic brain that allows him to draw information from people's minds upon contact with special mouth-like openings on his palms. The result is that his victims are left brain dead.
- Ellis Love – A telekinetic and telepath, the extent of which has yet to be revealed, but has been seen using telekinetic energy offensively in combat.

=== Mikel Fury's Team Gray ===
The leader of the other team is Mikel Fury and the names of the members have been revealed:

- Sandra Murphy - Mace of Aeshma
- Brian Cole - Cybernetic Organism
- Carlos Ayala - Telekinetic
- Red Webo - Creation Engine
- Jenny Monroe - Temporal Control
- Malcolm Monroe - Temporal Control
- Lynn Richards - Power Leech
- Robert Martin - Organic Builder

== The Heavenly Wheel ==
- Jake Fury – Scorpio
- Vasili Dassiev – Capricorn
- John Garrett – Aquarius
- Baron Strucker – Sagittarius
- Dum Dum Dugan – Libra
- Thomas Davidson – Virgo
- Shoji Soma – Pisces
- Cornelius Van Lunt – Taurus
- Nick Fury – Gemini
- Daniel Whitehall – Leo
- Viktor Uvarov – Cancer
- Leonardo da Vinci – Aries

== In other media ==
- The Secret Warriors appear in The Avengers: Earth's Mightiest Heroes, led by Nick Fury, and consisting of Quake, Black Widow, and Mockingbird. As in the comics, the Secret Warriors are formed in response to the Skrulls' impending invasion. However, Mockingbird was secretly captured and replaced by the Skrull Queen Veranke.
- The Secret Warriors appear in the Agents of S.H.I.E.L.D. episode, "The Team", led by Daisy Johnson and consisting of Elena "Yo-Yo" Rodriguez, Lincoln Campbell, and Joey Gutierrez. This version of the team is formed by S.H.I.E.L.D. to combat Gideon Malick and Hydra. However, the team is quickly disbanded after S.H.I.E.L.D. discovers Johnson was brainwashed by Hive.
- A version of the Secret Warriors inspired by Team White appears in Marvel Strike Force, consisting of a temporally-displaced Phantom Rider, Domino, Negasonic Teenage Warhead, Quake, and Yo-Yo Rodriguez.

== Bibliography ==
- Mighty Avengers #13, 18, 35
- Avengers: The Initiative #16-18
- Secret Warriors #1-28
- Dark Reign: The List – Secret Warriors #1
- Siege: Secret Warriors #1
- Secret Invasion #3-8
- Dark Reign: New Nation #1
- Siege #2-4
- Siege: Embedded #4
- New Avengers #62
- New Avengers Vol. 2 #1
- Secret Invasion: Front Line #3
- Dark Avengers #9

== Legacy ==
During the Secret Empire storyline, Daisy Johnson established a new incarnation of the team, this time actually named "Secret Warriors" to help fight the Hydra takeover of Manhattan. It consists of Ms. Marvel, Devil Dinosaur, Moon Girl, Inferno, and Karnak.
