= Secret Wars (disambiguation) =

Secret Wars is a 1984–1985 comics series by Marvel Comics.

Secret Wars or Secret War may also refer to:

== History ==
- Laotian Civil War (1959–1975), or Secret War, referring to American clandestine involvement as part of the Vietnam War

== Arts and entertainment ==
=== Comics ===
- Secret War (comics), a 2004–2005 Marvel Comics series
- Secret Wars (2015 comic book), a 2015–2016 Marvel Comics series
- Secret Wars II, a 1985–1986 Marvel Comics series
- "Secret Wars III", a 1988 Marvel Comics storyline

=== Film and television ===
- Avengers: Secret Wars, an upcoming Marvel Studios superhero film
- Secret Wars (2014 film), 2014 Polish film
- The Secret War (TV series), British 1977 World War II documentary series
- "Secret Wars", story arc of the 1997 Spider-Man animated TV series, see list of Spider-Man (1994 TV series) episodes
- "Secret Wars", subtitle of the fourth season of animated television series Avengers: Assemble

=== Other media ===
- Secret Wars (adventure), a role-playing game adventure based on the 1984 comics series
- Secret Wars (toy line), an action figure tie-in to the 1984 comics series
- Secret Wars (album), a 2004 album by Oneida
- The Secret War, a pre-launch campaign for the MMORPG The Secret World

== See also ==
- Secret Warriors (disambiguation)
- Secrets of War, a 2007 book by Jacques Vriens
- Secrets of War, American history documentary TV series
