= Eden Fesi =

Manifold
- Manifold as depicted in The Avengers (vol. 5) #5 (February 2013). Art by Carlos Pacheco.

Publication information
- Publisher: Marvel Comics
- First appearance: Secret Warriors #4 (July 2009)
- Created by: Jonathan Hickman; Stefano Caselli

In-story information
- Alter ego: Eden Fesi
- Species: Human mutant
- Team affiliations: Secret Warriors; Avengers; S.W.O.R.D.
- Abilities: Space communication; Teleportation; Portal creation; Space folding; Invisibility

Eden Fesi, also known as Manifold, is a superhero appearing in American comic books published by Marvel Comics. Created by Jonathan Hickman and Stefano Caselli, the character first appeared in Secret Warriors #4 (July 2009), and joined that comic's regular cast. Fesi is an Aboriginal Australian mutant with the ability to shape the universe and bend time and space, connecting one piece to another and allowing him to teleport. Fesi joined the Avengers as a part of the Marvel NOW! relaunch. In 2013, ComicsAlliance ranked Manifold as #12 on their list of the "50 Sexiest Male Characters in Comics".

== Publication history ==
Eden Fesi first appeared in Secret Warriors #4 (July 2009), and was created by writer Jonathan Hickman and artist Stefano Caselli. He appeared in the book until its conclusion in issue #28 (September 2011). He also made guest appearances as a member of the Secret Warriors in Dark Avengers #9 (November 2009), New Avengers #62 (April 2010), and Siege #2-3 (April–May 2010).

Fesi, as Manifold, appears as a member of Hickman's Avengers, beginning with Avengers (vol. 5) #1 (December 2012), a part of the Marvel NOW! relaunch. Hickman said that, when creating the character, he had initially intended to give him the codename "Calabi–Yau", named after a Calabi–Yau manifold, but when adding the character to the Avengers roster he decided on the codename "Manifold" instead.

== Fictional character biography ==
Eden Fesi, a mutant teleporter living in Kata Tjuta, Australia under the tutelage of Gateway, is recruited by Nick Fury to be a part of his Secret Warriors. Hesitant at first, he agrees when Gateway gives his blessing. Almost immediately after being recruited, Eden has to teleport the entire team into the middle of a large battle aboard a dock to save Fury. He accompanies the team on several missions, including an infiltration of the H.A.M.M.E.R. base that brings them into conflict with the Dark Avengers and an attack on a Hydra base that leaves Eden critically wounded. The team disbands, as Hellfire had betrayed them and Eden slips into a coma. Eden eventually makes a full recovery.

As part of the Marvel NOW! event, Eden is now operating under the moniker Manifold. He is recruited by Captain America and Iron Man to the Avengers, as a part of their attempt to make the team more global in scope.

When Krakoa is established as a mutant nation, Manifold joins S.W.O.R.D. as the 'Quintician', the leader of the Teleport Team. During Destiny of X, Manifold tells Cable he is leaving the S.W.O.R.D team. Together, they form a team with Wiz Kid, Weaponless Zsen, and Khora of the Burning Heart to combat Abigail Brand and her allies.

Manifold's team discovers that the Progenitors brainwashed Vulcan into working for Brand. During the confrontation, the Progenitors express an interest in Manifold for his powers and proceeded to torture him by opening a portal in his chest. They are stopped by Cable with the assistance of Lactuca the Knower. Having stopped Brand, Wiz Kid becomes the Station Commander of S.W.O.R.D. and Manifold chooses to stay under the new management.

Destiny later learns that Manifold will be essential to the future of Krakoa and the survival of mutantkind, and tasks Rogue and Gambit to bring him to her. Manifold is kidnapped by the Power Broker, who holds him captive under mind control through a device that will kill him if removed. Despite the rest of the hostages being freed, Manifold's device is not removed and he is kept in a pod by Destiny to help prevent a future crisis. Manifold is later freed and helps the X-Men infiltrate Orchis' base.

== Powers and abilities ==
Eden Fesi's mutation allows him to bend reality, fold and twist space-time, and speak with the very universe. Daisy Johnson described him as a "souped-up teleporter". Eden's portals stay open until he chooses to close them. It is later revealed that Eden actually talks to space and is described as a quintician. Abigail Brand reported that Eden asks space to do things for him, such as fold so he can walk across and essentially teleport, ask space to bend light around him rendering him invisible, and even teleport solar plasma from the sun to his hand.

== Other versions ==
An alternate universe version of Manifold from an unidentified universe appears in New Avengers (vol. 3). He initially works with Black Swan, but she kills him after his teleportation abilities cease to function.

Another version of Manifold appears in Aliens vs. Avengers as one of the few survivors of a Xenomorph attack on a mutant city on Mars.

== In other media ==
Eden Fesi appears in Marvel Heroes.
