= Stonewall (comics) =

Stonewall is the codename of two fictional characters appearing in American comic books published by Marvel Comics.

== Publication history ==
The first Stonewall first appeared in Uncanny X-Men #215 and was created by Chris Claremont and Alan Davis.

The second Stonewall first appeared in Mighty Avengers #18 and was created by Brian Michael Bendis and Alex Maleev.

== Fictional character biography ==
=== Louis Hamilton ===
Stonewall

Publication information
- Publisher: Marvel Comics
- First appearance: Uncanny X-Men #215 (March 1987)
- Created by: Chris Claremont; Alan Davis

In-story information
- Alter ego: Louis Hamilton
- Species: Human mutant
- Team affiliations: Freedom Force
- Abilities: Skilled hand to hand combatant Superhuman strength and endurance Enhanced resistance to injury

Stonewall and his allies, Crimson Commando and Super Sabre, are all super-powered U.S. veterans of World War II. The trio intend to continue their government service after the war by combating communism during the Cold War, but they are rebuffed by the U.S. government and forced into retirement. Angered by what they perceive as a decline in morals in the United States, the group become vigilantes. They capture criminals, then release and hunt them in the wilderness of upstate New York.

Mistaking Storm (the leader of the X-Men) for a criminal, the team capture and then hunt her. When Storm and Wolverine defeat the three, Stonewall and Crimson Commando agreed to turn themselves in to law enforcement authorities and confess their vigilantism.

Stonewall, Crimson Commando, and Super Sabre agree to join Freedom Force, a U.S. government sponsored team of superhumans, in exchange for their sentences being commuted. Stonewall's first mission with Freedom Force takes place during the storyline "The Fall of the Mutants", when the group attempts to prevent the X-Men from entering a building in which Destiny had prophesied that they would die.

Stonewall is part of the Freedom Force's expedition to defend Muir Island from the Reavers. During the mission, Stonewall is killed by Donald Pierce while trying to protect Mystique.

During the Necrosha storyline, Stonewall is resurrected via the Transmode Virus to serve as part of Selene's army. Under the control of Selene and Eli Bard, he attacks the mutant nation of Utopia.

=== Jerry Sledge ===
Stonewall

Publication information
- Publisher: Marvel Comics
- First appearance: The Mighty Avengers #13 (July 2008)
- Created by: Brian Michael Bendis; Alex Maleev

In-story information
- Alter ego: Jerry Sledge
- Team affiliations: Secret Warriors
- Abilities: Superhuman strength and endurance Ability to absorb the properties of elements

During the Secret Invasion storyline, Jerry Sledge is recruited by Daisy Johnson to be a member of Nick Fury's new Secret Warriors. While in battle, Johnson refers to Sledge as "Stonewall".

It is later revealed that Stonewall is the son of Absorbing Man. He was conceived before his father obtained superpowers. One day, he came into contact with his father which caused Stonewall to gain his powers.

Stonewall and the rest of the Secret Warriors are taken to Heaven's Hell, a secret base in orbit. There, Nick Fury explains the plan for the main team to hit Hydra while the other teams take on the last Leviathan bases. Using Eden Fesi's portal, the group travels to the Hydra base Gehenna and attempts to destroy it. However, they had been expected to arrive and the base is already armed. Following the fight against Hydra, Stonewall reunites with the team and joins up with Team Black and the Howling Commandos.

== Powers and abilities ==
Stonewall's mutant physiology granted him immense superhuman strength and endurance, including a high resistance to physical injury. He was especially resistant to blunt physical force, resisting blows from Rogue and the Blob. He was also a skilled physical fighter. He could, however, be grappled and made to lose his footing through indirect attacks. In these cases, his dense body could put him at a disadvantage, as he nearly drowned in a mountain lake after Storm threw him in. Unable to get back to shore on his own, she had to help pull him out. Stonewall was also vulnerable to energy based attacks that were not kinetic in nature. Donald Pierce killed him with electrocution, flooding his body with electrical energy.

The Jerry Sledge incarnation of Stonewall possesses superhuman strength and endurance. When he lost his temper during a battle with Gorgon, he suddenly changed into a rock-skinned giant. Similar to his father, Stonewall is able to absorb the properties of elements.
