= Druid (disambiguation) =

A druid was a member of the learned class in ancient Celtic cultures. Some were priests, but the title was also used for doctors, law-speakers, and other high-ranking professionals.

Druid may also refer to:

== Roles and organizations ==
- Druid, the highest level of study within the Order of Bards, Ovates and Druids
- Druid, a member of the Ancient Order of Druids, a social service organisation
- Druid, a rank within the Gorsedd of Bards
- Druides, a World War II spy ring, led by Georges Lamarque, that provided V-1 and V-2 Intelligence
- Druidry (modern), a variety of modern spiritual or religious practices, appealing to perceived aspects of ancient Druidic practice

== Arts, entertainment, and media ==
- Henry Hall Dixon (1822–1870) or The Druid, English lawyer and sporting journalist
- Druid (band), a British progressive rock band from the late 1970s
- Druid (character class), a character that represents a magical priest of nature in role-playing games
  - Druid (Dungeons & Dragons), a character class in Dungeons & Dragons
- Druid (video game), a computer game for the Amstrad CPC, Commodore 64, and ZX Spectrum
- Druid Theatre Company, a theatre company in Galway, Ireland
- Druids (film), a 2001 film about Gallic druids resisting the Roman armies
- Shannara Druids, an order of historians, philosophers, magic-users, teachers and researchers in the Shannara series of fantasy novels by Terry Brooks
- The Druid King, a 2003 historical novel by American novelist Norman Spinrad
- The Druids of Stonehenge (band), a 1960s American band based in New York City

== Other uses ==
- Aedia funesta or the druid, a moth of the family Erebidae
- Druid, Denbighshire, Wales
- Druid (open-source data store), also called Apache Druid
- Druid, in software, another name for a wizard user interface function that leads a user through a series of steps
- Druids, a hairpin bend at Brands Hatch racetrack, England
- Druid High School, defunct high school in Alabama, United States
- USS Druid (SP-321), a United States Navy patrol vessel in commission from 1917 to 1919
