= Griffin (Marvel Comics) =

Marvel Comics fictional character

- Griffin as depicted in New Avengers #61 (March 2010). Art by Daniel Acuña.

Publication information
- Publisher: Marvel Comics
- First appearance: Amazing Adventures (vol. 2) #15 (November 1972)
- Created by: Steve Englehart; Tom Sutton

In-story information
- Alter ego: Johnny Horton
- Team affiliations: Secret Empire; Masters of Evil
- Abilities: Superhuman strength, speed, agility and durability Enhanced reflexes/reactions Flight via wings Sharp claws and teeth Spiked prehensile tail Telepathic ability to command birds

Griffin (Johnny Horton) is a supervillain appearing in American comic books published by Marvel Comics. He is the father of Yo-Yo Rodriguez. Created by writer Steve Englehart and artist Tom Sutton, the character first appeared in Amazing Adventures #15 (November 1972). A former gang member, Horton was transformed into a griffin-like creature by the Secret Empire.

== Publication history ==
Griffin first appeared in Amazing Adventures #15 (November 1972), and was created by writer Steve Englehart and artist Tom Sutton.

== Fictional character biography ==
John "Johnny" Horton was born in Tacoma, Washington. He later became a punk in the New Orleans gangs trying to make a name for himself until a Chicago man used him for some local muscle. Impressing his employer, Horton wanted to be more than a cheap hood resulting in the Chicago man bringing him to the Secret Empire to be made into a supervillain. An unnamed scientist/surgeon who worked there followed the Empire's orders by transforming Horton into a griffin-like creature using surgery and a mutagenic serum. As Griffin, Horton possesses large wings, a lion-like mane, and a spiked prehensile tail.

Griffin is tasked with killing Beast as part of the Secret Empire's campaign against the Brand Corporation. During the battle, Griffin is thrown off a building, but is rescued by Beast. Griffin later meets with Linda Donaldson (Number Nine of Secret Empire) to discuss the case with Beast and his frustration of being turned into a monster.

While in jail, Griffin mutates further, which degrades his mind and gives him fangs, a powerful tail, and superhuman strength. Griffin escapes prison and tracks down the man who transformed him, then kills him when he refuses to tell Griffin the Secret Empire's whereabouts. Griffin later attacks Spider-Man and Beast, who manage to defeat him in a battle on the Brooklyn Bridge.

Griffin mutates further, resulting in him becoming more animalistic and losing his capability of speech. He pursues and fights Namor, but is defeated after Namor brings the battle underwater. Griffin ends up in Namor's custody, serving as his steed. Griffin is later imprisoned in Ryker's Island, where he regains his humanoid form.

Griffin joins the Hood's gang in an attack on the New Avengers, who were expecting the Dark Avengers. Norman Osborn recruits Griffin, among other villains, for his training facility Camp H.A.M.M.E.R.. Griffin undergoes extensive training at Camp H.A.M.M.E.R., which does not bring him up to speed. He and the other recruits are considered failures.

During the "Fear Itself" storyline, Griffin is among the inmates who escape from the Raft after Juggernaut damages the facility. Griffin assists Basilisk, Man-Bull, and Hecate in a bank robbery. Hecate's magic turns Griffin into a more feline form. When Hercules fights a resurrected Kyknos, Basilisk and Man-Bull flee while Griffin stays behind and becomes Hercules' steed. After Hercules recovers, Hercules and Griffin track down Basilisk and Man-Bull and convince them to help fight Kyknos and Hecate. After Kyknos is defeated and Hecate escapes, Griffin, Man-Bull, and Basilisk return to their normal forms.

Max Fury, Nick Fury's Life Model Decoy, later recruits Griffin into the Masters of Evil.

== Powers and abilities ==
Griffin has superhuman strength, durability, and speed, allowing him to fly up to fly at 150–160 mph. His claws and teeth can be used to rend flesh, wood, and possibly even soft metals. In his humanoid form, he has the telepathic ability to command birds.

On occasion, Griffin has mutated into a more bestial form with lesser intelligence and increased strength. In this form, he is unable to use his telepathy. In exchange, Griffin possesses immense strength, comparable to that of Wonder Man.

== In other media ==
- Griffin makes non-speaking appearances in The Avengers: Earth's Mightiest Heroes.
- Griffin makes a non-speaking cameo appearance in Avengers Confidential: Black Widow & Punisher.
