= Hellfire (J. T. Slade) =

Comics character

- Hellfire as depicted in Secret Warriors #22 (November 2010). Art by Alessandro Vitti.

Publication information
- First appearance: The Mighty Avengers #13 (July 2008)
- Created by: Brian Michael Bendis (writer); Alex Maleev (artist)

In-story information
- Species: Human
- Team affiliations: Secret Warriors; Hydra
- Abilities: Superhuman reflexes Hellfire channeling

Hellfire (J. T. Slade) is a fictional character appearing in American comic books published by Marvel Comics.

Hellfire appears in the third and fourth seasons of Agents of S.H.I.E.L.D., portrayed by Axle Whitehead.

== Publication history ==
Hellfire first appeared in The Mighty Avengers #13 and was created by Brian Michael Bendis and Alex Maleev.

== Fictional character biography ==
The grandson of Carter Slade, James Taylor James (also known as J. T. Slade) is recruited by Nick Fury to battle the "Secret Invasion" of the shape-shifting alien Skrulls. Under the codename Hellfire, Slade makes numerous appearances in the ongoing series Secret Warriors.

Slade is later revealed to be a double agent for Hydra. After learning of Slade's allegiance, Nick Fury allows him to fall to his death.

== Powers and abilities ==
Slade has superhuman reflexes and the ability to cause a chain to ignite in flame and cause massive damage. Slade was also trained in hand-to-hand combat by Nick Fury.

== In other media ==
J. T. James appears in Agents of S.H.I.E.L.D., portrayed by Axle Whitehead. This version is an Inhuman demolitions expert and former mercenary with the ability to ignite objects and make them explode on contact.
