= Nick Fury vs. S.H.I.E.L.D. =

- Cover to book 2

Publication information
- Publisher: Marvel Comics
- Format: Ongoing series
- No. of issues: 6
- Main character(s): Nick Fury

Nick Fury vs. S.H.I.E.L.D. is a six-issue comic book miniseries published by Marvel Comics in 1988. It was written by Bob Harras and drawn by Paul Neary. Each issue is 48 pages long and they are referred to as books. The series was the first time in almost twenty years that Nick Fury and S.H.I.E.L.D. was the main focus and the series sold exceptionally well, prompting Marvel to produce an ongoing series of Nick Fury, Agent of S.H.I.E.L.D. in 1989 that lasted 47 issues.

== Publication history ==
1. Book One of Six: The Delta Equation (June 1988) Cover by Jim Steranko
2. Book Two of Six: Into the Depths (July 1988) Cover by Bill Sienkiewicz
3. Book Three of Six: Uneasy Allies (August 1988) Cover by M. D. Bright
4. Book Four of Six: The Eastern Connection (September 1988) Cover by Joe Jusko
5. Book Five of Six: The Ascension Call (October 1988) Cover by Kevin Nowlan
6. Book Six of Six: Light of Truth (November 1988) Cover by Tom Palmer

== Plot ==
The series is about a rogue LMD (Life Model Decoy) who is after Nick Fury's infinity formula, so the LMD decides to infiltrate S.H.I.E.L.D. The spy network has become corrupt and Fury has to go underground to fight it.

== Reception ==
Marc Buxton of Den of Geek expressed that Nick Fury vs. S.H.I.E.L.D. stands as one of the finest S.H.I.E.L.D. stories ever written and that it features the finest writing of future Marvel editor-in-chief Bob Harras's career. Lesley Goldberg of The Hollywood Reporter stated that the series is a great Nick Fury story. Supermegamonkey.net stated that the series creator Bob Harras built a nice conspiracy thriller with the story, with elements from James Bond by way of Jim Steranko and that the art by Neary and DeMulder is straightforward and good.

== See also ==
- 1988 in comics
