= Gorgon (Tomi Shishido) =

Fictional comic book character

- Cover of Wolverine (vol. 3) #30; Art by John Romita Jr.

Publication information
- Publisher: Marvel Comics
- First appearance: Wolverine (vol. 3) #20 (December 2004)
- Created by: Mark Millar; John Romita Jr.

In-story information
- Alter ego: Tomi Shishido
- Species: Human mutant
- Team affiliations: Legionaries; Swordbearers of Krakoa; Great Captains of Krakoa; Hydra; Dawn of the White Light; The Hand; H.A.M.M.E.R.; Dark Avengers
- Notable aliases: Wolverine
- Abilities: Ability to turn humans to stone by making eye contact with them; Superhuman strength, speed, agility, dexterity, reflexes/reactions, coordination, balance, and endurance; Regenerative healing factor; Telepathy; Empathy; Hand Mysticism; Teleportation device; Genius level intellect in multiple areas; Extraordinary hand to hand combatant; Expert swordsman

Gorgon (Tomi Shishido) is a supervillain appearing in American comic books published by Marvel Comics. The character first appeared in the third volume of Wolverine as an enemy of Wolverine. During the Krakoan Age, Gorgon was given a second chance on the mutant nation of Krakoa and joined the Legionaries, Krakoa's peacekeeping force.

== Publication history ==
Gorgon first appeared in Wolverine (vol. 3) #20 (December 2004), and was created by Mark Millar and John Romita Jr. The character was killed in Wolverine (vol. 3) #31, only to be resurrected later in Secret Warriors #2.

Gorgon was among several villains who were given a second chance on the mutant nation of Krakoa. In January 2022, Marvel Comics ran a voting contest where voters could pick between one of ten characters to join the X-Men, with Gorgon being among the candidates. In July 2022, Gorgon appeared in a digital comic released as a companion to the second Hellfire Gala. This comic revealed that the election had also been held in-universe, with Gorgon losing the vote.

== Fictional character biography ==
Tomi Shishido is a member of the Hand and Hydra and a powerful mutant, leading the extremist mutant society Dawn of the White Light. As a child, he possesses near superhuman levels of intelligence, being able to speak, walk, read, and write by the age of one.

At age 13, Shishido manifested the mutant ability to petrify others by sight. The media dubbed him "the Gorgon", after the Gorgon of Greek mythology. Shortly after, he became the leader of the Dawn of the White Light, a terrorist cult. Shishido went on to join the Hand, killing his family to prove his ruthlessness and worthiness to the Hand's cause.

Gorgon manages to capture Wolverine, who is brainwashed and forced to attack S.H.I.E.L.D. and kill hundreds of agents, among other crimes. After attacking the X-Mansion, Wolverine is caught and freed from the brainwashing. He attacks Gorgon, who nearly kills him until Wolverine reflects his vision with his claws. Gorgon's body is petrified and subsequently shattered by Wolverine. During the "Dark Reign" storyline, Hydra forces the Hand to resurrect Gorgon using the fragments of his body.

In Fear Itself, Gorgon joins H.A.M.M.E.R. and Norman Osborn's Dark Avengers, during which he poses as Wolverine. He and the original Madame Hydra secretly plan to kill Osborn if their co-conspirator proves to be too dangerous and use the Dark Avengers to cause discord by serving as a voice of the "disenfranchised" unsatisfied with the status quo. While impersonating Wolverine, Gorgon uses false claws that are a part of his costume.

Gorgon is among the mutants invited by the Quiet Council of Krakoa to live in the newly established mutant nation of Krakoa, provided he no longer holds any grudges against his fellow mutants. He serves as a bodyguard for Charles Xavier, Magneto, and Apocalypse at political events.

Gorgon participates in Saturnyne's X of Swords contest against Arakko, single-handedly turning the tide of the tournament in Krakoa's favor by defeating 13 of White Sword's one hundred champions before being killed by White Sword himself. White Sword offers to resurrect Gorgon as one of his champions as a reward for his bravery, but he declines and is praised as a hero upon his death. Gorgon is resurrected by the Five, but his mind is damaged because he died in Otherworld. Gorgon's mind is restored after he dies for a second time and passes through the Waiting Room, a realm created by the Scarlet Witch.

== Powers and abilities ==
Gorgon possesses a variety of superhuman abilities as a result of genetic mutation and mystical enhancement from the Hand. His primary mutant ability is the ability to transform an individual into stone via eye contact. He often wears a mask or dark sunglasses to see without affecting those around him.

After his resurrection, Gorgon's strength, durability, and speed were heightened to superhuman levels, the exact limits of which are unrevealed. Gorgon also possesses an accelerated healing factor that enables him to repair damaged or destroyed tissue with extraordinary speed and efficiency.

Aside from his physical advantages, Gorgon possesses telepathy that allows him to detect the thoughts and emotions of others. His telepathy also enables him to perceive his surroundings if necessary, such as when he is blindfolded.

Gorgon is an extraordinary hand-to-hand combatant, even before his resurrection, trained in multiple forms of martial arts. He is an expert swordsman and typically wields a katana.

== In other media ==
- Gorgon appears in Marvel Heroes, voiced by Crispin Freeman.
- Gorgon appears as a boss in Marvel Puzzle Quest.
- Gorgon appears in Marvel Snap.
