= Secret Warriors (2009 series) =

Comic series from Marvel Comics

Publication information
- Publisher: Marvel Comics
- Schedule: Monthly
- Format: Ongoing
- Genre: Superhero
- Publication date: 2009
- No. of issues: 28
- Main character(s): Several; Daisy Johnson; Nick Fury

Creative team
- Created by: Jonathan Hickman & Stephano Caselli
- Written by: Brian Michael Bendis; Jonathan Hickman
- Artist: Stefano Caselli
- Penciller: Stefano Caselli
- Inker: Stefano Caselli
- Letterer(s): Artmonkeys, David 'Dave' Lanphear – 'Comicraft/DL & Artmonkeys Studios'
- Colorist: Daniele Rudoni – 'Danielle Rudoni'
- Editor(s): Tom Brevoort; Joe Quesada; Jeanine Schaefer

Secret Warriors is a 2009 comic book ongoing series published by Marvel Comics, the series focuses mainly on Nick Fury and his secret teams (Team White being one off), which the title is referencing to as well as members of other hidden groups, such as the ones from Hydra. The series was written by Brian Michael Bendis and Jonathan Hickman, with art by Stefano Caselli. The series ran for 28 issues and ended in 2011.

== Publication history ==
The series has been published in several collected editions, two for each storyline with one version in hardcover and the other in trade paperback format. The hardcover for the first storyline was published with the tagline: "The greater sin is doing nothing when you could be giving everything...of dreaming too small. I will be the ONE MAN."

== Plot ==
The series focuses on Nick Fury and his secret teams who are meant to combat Hydra who have infiltrated the spy agency S.H.I.E.L.D.

== Roster ==
- Nick Fury
- Quake
- Hellfire
- Druid
- Phobos
- Stonewall
- Eden Fesi

== Reception ==
The series holds an average rating of 7.7 by 128 professional critics on the review aggregation website Comic Book Roundup.

== Prints ==
=== Issues ===
No.	Title	Cover date	Comic Book Roundup rating	Estimated sales (first month)	Rated
#1	—N/a	April 2009	8.2 by eight professional critics.	57,694, ranked 19th in North America	T
#2	—N/a	May 2009	7.9 by seven professional critics.	48,079, ranked 24th in North America	T
#3	—N/a	June 2009	8.0 by seven professional critics.	50,122, ranked 31st in North America	T
#4	—N/a	July 2009	7.5 by eight professional critics.		
#5	—N/a	August 2009	7.9 by seven professional critics.		
#6	—N/a	September 2009	8.2 by six professional critics.		
#7	—N/a	October 2009	8.0 by four professional critics.		
#8	—N/a	November 2009	7.9 by five professional critics.		
#9	—N/a	December 2009	8.2 by three professional critics.		
#10	—N/a	January 2010	6.8 by two professional critics.		
#11	—N/a	February 2010	7.3 by two professional critics.		
#12	—N/a	March 2010	7.3 by three professional critics.		
#13	—N/a	April 2010	7.6 by four professional critics.		
#14	—N/a	May 2010	8.2 by three professional critics.		
#15	—N/a	June 2010	8.6 by six professional critics.		
#16	—N/a	July 2010	7.8 by four professional critics.		
#17	—N/a	August 2010	8.3 by five professional critics.		
#18	—N/a	September 2010	8.0 by six professional critics.		
#19	—N/a	October 2010	8.8 by two professional critics.		
#20	—N/a	November 2010	5.7 by seven professional critics.		
#21	—N/a	December 2010	6.0 by three professional critics.		
#22	—N/a	January 2011	7.8 by three professional critics.		
#23	Rebirth	February 2011	6.5 by two professional critics.		
#24	—N/a	March 2011	6.8 by five professional critics.		
#25	—N/a	May 2011	8.3 by five professional critics.		
#26	—N/a	June 2010	8.3 by three professional critics.		
#27	—N/a	July 2010	8.1 by four professional critics.		
#28	—N/a	September 2010	8.1 by four professional critics.		

=== Collected editions ===
Title	Material collected	Pages	Publication date	ISBN
Secret Warriors Vol. 1: Nick Fury, Agent of Nothing	Secret Warriors #1–6 and material from Dark Reign: New Nation #1	184	September 16, 2009	978-0-7851-3999-7
Secret Warriors Vol. 2: God of Fear, God of War	Secret Warriors #7–10, Dark Reign: The List – Secret Warriors #1	144	January 27, 2010	978-0-7851-4306-2
Secret Warriors Vol. 3: Wake the Beast	Secret Warriors #11–16	145	July 28, 2010	978-0-7851-4757-2
Secret Warriors Vol. 4: Last Ride of the Howling Commandos	Secret Warriors #17–19, Siege: Secret Warriors #1	99	November 10, 2010	978-0-7851-4759-6
Secret Warriors Vol. 5: Night	Secret Warriors #20–24	128	June 15, 2011	978-0-7851-4802-9
Secret Warriors Vol. 6: Wheels Within Wheels	Secret Warriors #25–28	112	September 28, 2011	978-0-7851-5814-1
Secret Warriors: The Complete Collection Vol. 1	Secret Warriors #1-16, Dark Reign: The List — Secret Warriors #1 and material from Dark Reign: New Nation #1	480	June 2, 2015	978-0785197638
Secret Warriors: The Complete Collection Vol. 2	Secret Warriors #17-28, Siege: Secret Warriors #1	352	July 28, 2015	978-0785197645
Secret Warriors Omnibus	Secret Warriors #1-28, Dark Reign: The List — Secret Warriors #1, Siege: Secret Warriors #1, Mighty Avengers #13, 18 and material from Dark Reign: New Nation #1	904	July 18, 2012	978-0785163336
