= Dark Reign (comics) =

2008–2009 Marvel Comics storyline

- Cover to Secret Invasion: Dark Reign. Art by Alex Maleev.
- Publisher: Marvel Comics
- Publication date: February 2009
- Genre: Superhero; Crossover
Title(s)
Dark Reign Files
Dark Reign: New Nation
Dark Reign: The Goblin Legacy
Marvel Spotlight: Dark Reign
Secret Invasion: Dark Reign
See also: Issues section
- Main character(s): New Avengers; Iron Man; Fantastic Four; Black Panther; Storm; Norman Osborn; Dark Avengers; The Cabal; Thunderbolts; The Hood's Crime Syndicate; Dormammu

Creative team
- Writer(s): Brian Michael Bendis; Jonathan Hickman; Matt Fraction; Rick Remender; Kieron Gillen; Peter Milligan; Andy Diggle; Greg Pak; Jason Aaron; Dan Slott; Reginald Hudlin
- Artist: Alex Maleev

Dark Reign is a 2008 to 2009 comic book branding used by Marvel Comics. It deals with the aftermath of the "Secret Invasion" storyline, which resulted in a shift of power in the Marvel Universe toward Norman Osborn. The title refers to Osborn's rise to national power and the ramifications thereof. Joe Quesada, then-editor-in-chief of Marvel Comics, stated that "Dark Reign is not really an event, it's what's happening in the Marvel Universe." He believes that "Dark Reign leads to an interesting place in the Marvel Universe. I think you'll see a pulling back at the end of Dark Reign, but you'll understand at the end of it what we were trying to get to."

== Publication history ==
The story-line begins with the release of Secret Invasion: Dark Reign, a one-shot by Brian Michael Bendis (writer) and Alex Maleev (art), in December 2008. It continued in standalone mini-series and some individual issues of ongoing Marvel Comics titles throughout 2009. Selected ongoing Marvel titles were temporarily renamed to highlight their involvement in the story-line.

Initial promotional images for the story-line included a series of "We Lost, They Won" images showing: a severed robotic head of Iron Man, Emma Frost holding Cyclops's blood-covered visor, Captain America bowing to Norman Osborn, Daken looking down, Thor motionless, Venom defeating Spider-Man, Hank Pym, and the Green Goblin.

There is no core limited series as there was in the preceding Secret Invasion event. Instead, the story-line is made up of one-shots that help fill in the gaps, limited series exploring the effect of the event on teams and individuals, as well as tie-ins with other ongoing series. The main story-line led into the 2010 "Siege" crossover event, although some plot elements are ongoing.

== Plot ==
Following the Skrull invasion of Earth during Secret Invasion, Norman Osborn leverages his success in defeating the Skrulls to replace Tony Stark as director of S.H.I.E.L.D. Deadpool plays a large part in this, as he is supposed to send the information on how to kill the Skrull Queen Veranke to Nick Fury. An error occurs during the process and the information goes to Osborn instead. Osborn shoots Veranke in the head and becomes the director of S.H.I.E.L.D., which he replaces with H.A.M.M.E.R. Osborn simultaneously forms an alliance called the Cabal with Doctor Doom, Emma Frost, Namor, Loki, and the Hood. He uses H.A.M.M.E.R. to carry out his agenda and, at times, the Cabal's. However, Osborn's actions and his reputation influence a number of heroes and villains to attempt to resist Osborn's rule and remove him from power by force, if necessary.

== Main characters ==
- Norman Osborn is the former Green Goblin and central focus of Dark Reign. He is featured in most of the ongoing series and mini-series linked to the Dark Reign story-line. Brian Bendis noted that "people know he's a bastard, but ignore it as long he gives them safety." The character is shown as willing to destroy anything that threatens his public hero status. Writer Matt Fraction commented that as the Iron Patriot, he is a "showman in armor". Osborn keeps the more volatile members of the Cabal in line with a "secret weapon" which is revealed to be the Void. Across multiple titles, the character is shown with ongoing mental instability from his days as the Goblin.
- The Hood is featured heavily during the Dark Reign story-line in both New Avengers and Punisher. In the first, Bendis explores the character's relationship with Dormammu and his quest to become the new Sorcerer Supreme. Rick Remender, writer of Punisher, focuses more on his activities as a gangster and criminal. During the event, the character also features in the Dark Reign: The Hood mini-series, written by Jeff Parker, and has a major role in Marvel Zombies 4. Writer Fred Van Lente explained that,

"The Hood, of course, may not be acting of his own volition, since he has an unholy alliance with the Dread Dormammu, who may want the zombies and the virus that creates them for his own nefarious purposes. Plus, the Hood doesn't just bring any group of villains with him on this jaunt. He brings a very horror-oriented group of villains with him." (This group is the Night Shift.)

- Doctor Doom hopes to use the Cabal to conquer the world and, aided by his ally Namor, seize power when Osborn implodes, preferring to consider the Cabal as an association rather than as partners. A short story written by Jonathan Hickman reveals that he plans to kill or enslave his Cabal allies in the near future. Doom is shown almost killing the Black Panther when the latter rejects a chair in the Cabal. Doom also uses Latveria to house the Asgardians as part of an agreement with Loki, which allows them to get rid of Thor, then exiled from Asgard. However, Doom makes it clear that he trusts neither Loki nor Namor, but merely finds them useful. In Siege: The Cabal, Doom leaves the Cabal after one of his Doombot duplicates he sent in his place is attacked by Osborn's secret weapon.
- Loki is often shown as a manipulator. He uses Osborn's help to make Thor kill Bor (Odin's father), and cause Thor's banishment. With Doom's help, Loki realizes his plan of taking the throne of Asgard. During Chthon's attack on Earth, Loki disguises himself as the Scarlet Witch and gathers a new Mighty Avengers team to combat Chthon. Loki then subtly manipulates them to disturb Osborn's mental state and quicken his fall.
- Namor has possibly the smallest role in the Cabal, appearing mostly in titles written by Matt Fraction. Fraction shows him as a warrior with great pride, and builds a sexual relationship between him and Emma Frost. Namor becomes one of the leaders of the Dark X-Men, as shown in Fraction's Uncanny X-Men as well as their own Dark Reign tie-in series. Namor was written as a loyal member of the Cabal until "Utopia", where he and Frost betray Osborn and help the X-Men create their own island.
- Emma Frost wants the mutant community to have a position of power in Osborn's new world order. Multiple stories indicate that her relationship with Cyclops suffers because of secrets they keep from each other. Frost and Namor become the leaders of the Dark X-Men. She helps lead the Dark X-Men until the regular X-Men are captured. She and Namor turn against Osborn and help establish the Utopia island. During a battle with the Dark Avengers, Frost uses her telepathy to defeat the Sentry by taking part of the Void into herself and frightening him away. However, Frost is forced to remain in her diamond form in order to keep the Void trapped.
- Victoria Hand is a former S.H.I.E.L.D. Business Affairs Operative. She is now Osborn's Deputy Director of H.A.M.M.E.R. Osborn has given her a list of jobs for building "a new world peacekeeping task force from scratch," including, but not limited to: creating an acronym for H.A.M.M.E.R., writing a full report on the Fifty State Initiative, and stripping down and rebuilding Camp Hammond. Osborn calls her "my eyes and ears and mouth," and names her his second-in-command over his team of Avengers. She is sent by Osborn himself to take on Bruce Banner and his son, Skaar, where she shows great battle skills.

== One-shots ==
One-shots help the transition from Secret Invasion and fill in other details behind the main story-line.

=== Dark Reign Files ===
Quasimodo enters the services of Norman Osborn as he puts together a dossier of different villains on which ones are a threat, should be locked up, or would be of use to Osborn. He compiles each villains according to threat, loyalty, influence, power, and expendability that are mentioned in their final assessment.

=== Dark Reign: The Cabal ===
Written by Rick Remender, Jonathan Hickman, Matt Fraction, Kieron Gillen, and Peter Milligan, this one-shot features five vignettes that provide further information about the motivations of the members of the Cabal.

It is reprinted in the Siege Prelude trade paperback.

=== Dark Reign: Made Men ===
Written by Frank Tieri, this one-shot features vignettes that explore the impact of Osborn's rise, such as Attuma's resurrection, the appearance of the new Enforcer, the return of the original Spymaster, and the appearance of a new Jack O'Lantern.

=== Dark Reign: New Nation ===
This kicks off ongoing series Secret Warriors, Agents of Atlas and War Machine and limited series Skrull Kill Krew and New Avengers: The Reunion.

=== Dark Reign: Goblin Legacy ===
The comic sees Victoria Hand collecting info about Norman Osborn's past.

=== M.O.D.O.K.: Reign Delay ===
This story was written and drawn by Ryan Dunlavey and shows M.O.D.O.K.'s attempt to take over his home town Erie, Pennsylvania. It was serialized on Marvel Digital Comics before appearing as a one-shot.

=== Other one-shots ===
- Captain America Who Will Wield the Shield
- Dark Avengers/Uncanny X-Men: Exodus
- Dark Avengers/Uncanny X-Men: Utopia
- Dark X-Men: The Confession
- Secret Invasion Dark Reign
- Secret Invasion Requiem
- Free Comic Book Day Avengers
- Planet Skaar
- Thor Defining Moments
- Uncanny X-Men Annual 2

== Ongoing titles ==
Dark Reign was used as a springboard to launch these ongoing series.

=== Agents of Atlas ===
The Agents of Atlas are shown opposing Osborn's agenda by taking on the role of "super-villains". Their first act is to attack Fort Knox and steal the gold reserve, which Osborn planned on using to finance a secret weapons system.

=== Black Panther ===
Prince Namor, the Sub-Mariner, attempts to recruit T'Challa for the Cabal, a secret council of super-villains. Attacked by the forces of fellow Cabal member Doctor Doom, T'Challa is left comatose. His sister Shuri is trained as the next Panther, with the mantle passing onto her officially after T'Challa awakens from his coma and attempts to recover from his injuries. This then leads to Doomwar.

=== Dark Avengers ===
Written by Bendis, the series chronicles the aftermath of the U.S. government's disbanding of the federally sanctioned superhero team, the Avengers, and its reconstruction under Osborn's control. Their first mission is to save Doctor Doom and Latveria from Morgan le Fay.

=== Punisher ===
Marvel relaunched The Punisher War Journal in 2009 as simply Punisher, with a thematic link to the events of the Dark Reign story-line. It sees Punisher attempting to kill Osborn, but Goblin sends his cabal member Hood against Punisher. Punisher then goes against Hood's gang.

=== Secret Warriors ===
This series, co-plotted by Bendis with Jonathan Hickman writing, was launched as part of the Dark Reign story-line. Following their introduction in the Secret Invasion tie-in issues of The Mighty Avengers, Fury and the Secret Warriors discover that S.H.I.E.L.D. has been controlled by Hydra since its creation, and set out to defeat both Hydra and Norman Osborn's H.A.M.M.E.R.

=== Spider Woman ===
After Veranke's actions leave her feeling mistreated, Jessica joins S.W.O.R.D. after she is recruited by Abigail Brand. Her first mission takes her to Madripoor where she takes on a Skrull posing as Spider-Man. After run-ins with Hydra, another Skrull, and the new Thunderbolts, Jessica eventually finds a wayward Skrull and she takes it down with the help of her teammates in the New Avengers. After the mission, Brand offers her different, new opportunities within S.W.O.R.D

=== S.W.O.R.D ===
Henry Peter Gyrich is assigned as S.W.O.R.D. co-commander alongside Brand. Gyrich is able to persuade the heads of S.W.O.R.D. to pass legislation to have all aliens deported from Earth while Brand was distracted with another mission. He manages to take several notable aliens into custody including Noh-Varr, Adam X, Beta Ray Bill, Jazinda, Karolina Dean, and Hepzibah.

=== Vengeance of Moon Knight ===
Moon Knight returns to New York after faking his death with Jake Lockley as his dominant personality, but still struggles against his violent nature and is hounded by Khonshu in the form of a small imaginary tormentor resembling a man in the Moon Knight costume with a bird skull who goads him to kill.

=== The Amazing Spider-Man ===
The Amazing Spider-Man #595–599

=== Deadpool and the Thunderbolts ===
During Secret Invasion, Osborn steals information that Deadpool had stolen from the Skrulls. The story "How Low Can You Go?" deals with the fallout from that, as writer Daniel Way explains: "The first thing Osborn does to try and take care of the situation is to bring in a hired gun to take Deadpool down, which would be Tiger-Shark. That would be the standard thing to do, but of course everything about Deadpool is non-standard. So it goes completely awry and Norman has to get more serious about things." The story also sees the return of Bob, Agent of Hydra, as Daniel Way described: "I don't want the book to become 'Deadpool and Friends', so characters will drift in and out, but Bob was someone I definitely wanted to bring in. It just had to be at the perfect moment and when I was putting this story-line together that moment presented itself." This all leads directly to a confrontation with the new Thunderbolts team (now composed of black ops mercenaries) in "Magnum Opus", which crosses over between Deadpool (vol. 2) #8–9 and Thunderbolts #130–131. According to Thunderbolts writer Andy Diggle: "It's a natural progression for Deadpool to go after Norman, and for Norman to send his personal hit-squad after Deadpool." In Deadpool (vol. 2) #10, Osborn discovers that the Thunderbolts failed to kill Deadpool, so he sends Bullseye, posing as Hawkeye, to kill him. However, Bullseye also fails twice, and then pays Deadpool the money Osborn owed so his life would be spared. The Thunderbolts recruit several new members as assassins, including Nuke, Ant-Man, and Grizzly.

=== Ms. Marvel ===
Refusing to serve under Osborn, Ms. Marvel flees Avengers Tower and joins the New Avengers, becoming second-in-command. Osborn appoints former Thunderbolt member Moonstone (Karla Sofen) as the "new" Ms. Marvel to his Dark Avengers team; Moonstone wears a variation of Ms. Marvel's original costume. Osborn engineers a battle that results in Danvers' powers overloading, causing her apparent death. Moonstone takes over the title role in the ongoing Ms. Marvel series. Carol Danvers returns with the aid of the New Avengers, a group of M.O.D.O.K. embryos (creations of the organization Advanced Idea Mechanics [AIM]), and a character known as the "Storyteller" and reclaims the title of Ms. Marvel from Karla Sofen.

== Limited series ==
Dark Reign limited series look at the impact of the story-line on specific characters and groups.

=== All-New Savage She-Hulk ===
Following the failed assassination attempt during which a key component of the male genetic birthing matrix—stolen to replace an identical component of the Femizon's matrix—is destroyed, Lyra is dispatched back in time to the era of Dark Reign on Earth-616 in a last-ditch attempt to prevent the extinction of her people.

=== Captain America: Reborn ===
A six-issue limited series.

=== Dark Avengers: Ares ===
This saw Ares training H.A.M.M.E.R agents and then tackling some enemies from the past, including his son.

=== Dark Reign: Elektra ===
A five-issue limited series written by Zeb Wells with artwork by Clay Mann, the series explores the reaction of the world to the return of Elektra in the aftermath of the Secret Invasion.

=== Dark Reign: Fantastic Four ===
A five-issue limited series, written by Jonathan Hickman, explores the impact of an assault by H.A.M.M.E.R. on the Baxter Building and the team.

=== Dark Reign: Hawkeye ===
Written by Andy Diggle and drawn by Tom Raney, this five-issue limited series follows the adventures of Bullseye in his identity as Dark Avengers member Hawkeye. The writer notes that the premise of the series is, "What happens when you hide that behind a hero mask? And what happens when the public is only allowed to see the hero mask, and not the monster behind it?"

=== Dark Reign: Lethal Legion ===
Written by Frank Tieri with art by Mateus Santolouco, the story shows Grim Reaper assembling a new Lethal Legion to combat Osborn. Writer Tieri notes that "they don't care who's in charge. They don't trust Norman, and they're not buying his talk. Not for a minute. Obviously that will bring them into conflict with Norman and the Dark Avengers."

=== Dark Reign: Mister Negative ===
A three-issue mini-series written by Fred Van Lente about a gang-war between Cabal member The Hood and Spider-Man foe Mister Negative. The series reveals more about the character, something creator Dan Slott had planned. Van Lente says: "One of the major subplots of the book is Betty Brant, who in the 'New Ways to Die' arc of The Amazing Spider-Man was assigned the job of digging up as much dirt as she possibly could on Martin Li... She's continuing that investigation in the Mister Negative series and inadvertently digs closer and closer to his actual origin and her life will be put in jeopardy as a result."

=== Dark Reign: The Hood ===
A five-issue mini-series that details the actions of Hood and the entity possessing the Hood. It shows that Hood has weakness in the form of his family and how he will do anything to keep their presence secret.

=== Dark Reign: The Sinister Spider-Man ===
A four-issue mini-series by writer Brian Reed and artist Chris Bachalo. On the genesis of the series, the writer notes: "The whole Marvel Universe thinks Spider-Man is living in Avengers Tower, when it's really Mac Gargan, who has a long history as a sociopath."

=== Dark Reign: Young Avengers ===
A five-issue mini-series by writer Paul Cornell and artist Mark Brooks, offered to Cornell based on the strength of his previous Young Avengers Presents story, which focused on Vision and Stature.

Following the events in Secret Invasion, the Young Avengers team heals the splits caused by the "Civil War", but find themselves fighting an even younger team. According to Cornell: "This is a story about what happens when the next generation come along, and suddenly you aren't the new young thing... There's this group of new super heroes who call themselves the Young Masters. They're young rebels on the run from the establishment, feared and hated by a world they've sworn to protect." This team is made up of Melter, Enchantress, Executioner, Big Zero, Coat of Arms, and Egghead. Cornell further said: "This is about what happens when a bunch of kids follow Osborn's lead, decide the world is hard and needs hard heroes."

=== Dark Reign: Zodiac ===
A three-issue mini-series by Joe Casey and Nathan Fox. The series follows the adventures of a villain known as Zodiac (who kills the members of the criminal organization of the same name) and gathers a group of villains around him to take on Osborn.

=== Dark X-Men: The Beginning & Dark X-Men ===
It details the story of Dark X-Men members and how they come to join this team and the return of X-Man to Marvel Universe.

=== Doctor Voodoo: Avenger of the Supernatural ===
A five-issue limited series, it shows how Doctor Voodoo faces the consequences of becoming Sorcerer Supreme and also takes down Nightmare.

=== New Avengers: The Reunion ===
A four-issue limited series, it deals with the reunion of Hawkeye and Mockingbird and how they come to terms with each other.

=== Skrull Kill Krew ===
A five-issue limited series written by Adam Felber, in which the original team is brought back together to fight the descendants of the original Cow-Skrulls.

=== The Torch ===
The series brings original Human Torch and Toro back to Marvel Universe.

=== Timestorm 2009–2099 ===
The series is a crossover between the mainstream Marvel Universe and a universe very similar to, but with notable differences from, the Marvel 2099 universe.

A 4-issue limited series titled Strange and 2-issue limited series X-Men vs Agents of Atlas was also released during Dark Reign.

=== Dark Reign: The List ===
A collection of one-shots dealing with different characters in the Marvel Universe who are hunted by Osborn, The List sets the status quo for many books. Every story also contains a back-up feature.

- Avengers was written by Bendis and Marko Djurdjevic. After the events of "Utopia", Clint Barton (Ronin), enraged that Osborn has been able to continue his rule despite his best efforts, decides to storm Avengers Tower and kill Osborn himself. After throwing Venom out the window and shooting Bullseye (who took his place as Hawkeye) five times, Barton confronts Moonstone and Daken. After killing Daken and using a security force field to eliminate Moonstone, Clint storms Osborn's lab and begins shooting what looks like him, but it is only a Life Model Decoy. Ares knocks Clint out and Osborn then arrests him. This issue gives a lettered preview of The List – Daredevil and an unlettered preview of The List – X-Men.
- Daredevil was written by Andy Diggle and Billy Tan. After a group of black-clad ninjas kill a group of crooked cops and lawyers, Osborn turns his attention to the Hand and their new leader, Daredevil. Sending Bullseye out in his old suit along with H.A.M.M.E.R. agents, Bullseye and Daredevil clash. The two duel until they make it to the top of a condemned building that is about to be demolished. Bullseye announces that the building will be destroyed, but the 107 people inside refuse to leave. When Daredevil does not help the people, the building explodes and kills them all. Bullseye then retreats and Daredevil is shocked. It turns out later that the ninjas were led by Lady Bullseye and Kingpin, and were used to set up Daredevil. This issue contains a preview of Daredevil #501.
- Uncanny X-Men was written by Matt Fraction and Alan Davis. After Emma Frost and Namor's betrayal, Osborn decides to send Namor's former lover, Marrina Smallwood, to kill the Atlanteans. After Smallwood's attack, the X-Men sense her approach and Iceman freezes the water with Psylocke's help. The X-Men then attack Marrina, and Namor eventually kills her. He throws her head into Avengers Tower and threatens to kill Osborn for what he has done. This issue contains "Dead Man Walking", Matt Fraction's first story at Marvel Comics.
- Secret Warriors was written by Hickman and Ed McGuiness. Fury goes to Avengers Tower and walks into Osborn's office. Osborn tries to frighten Fury by showing him his List (which contains: "Neutralize Clint Barton; Eliminate Daredevil; Kill Namor; Kill Nick Fury; Neutralize Bruce Banner; Kill Frank Castle; Control "The World"; Kill Spider-Man"), but Fury laughs it off because he has made a list of his own (whose items are: "Save the world; Punch Norman in the face; Have a beer"). He tells Osborn that he needs to take a man named Seth Waters into custody, a former S.H.I.E.L.D. agent funneling money into accounts such as that of a group called Leviathan. Osborn interrogates Waters before Bullseye tortures him. After Fury gets what he needs, a data retrieval device, his partner Garrett shoots Waters; Fury punches Osborn in the face; and the two escape with the device. Ares throws off the choppers pursuing them to let them escape. Fury opens the device to reveal that Hydra is a part of Leviathan, or Zodiac. This issue contains "Today Earth Dies", a reprint of a Nick Fury story first published in Strange Tales #168.
- Hulk was written by Greg Pak and Ben Oliver. In order to get rid of Bruce Banner and his son Skaar, Osborn sends a heavily armed Victoria Hand and Moonstone to attack the duo. Banner finds a way around everything the Hand throws at him, but during the battle, he is exposed to gamma radiation that eventually turns him back into the Hulk. The Hand and Moonstone are defeated, but they succeed in their task: ensuring Banner will turn into the Hulk and that Skaar will be there to fight him, hopefully leading to them killing each other. Banner tells Skaar that when he turns into the Hulk, Skaar must be prepared to kill him. This issue contains a reprint of Amazing Spider-Man #14.
- Punisher was written by Rick Remender and John Romita, Jr. Following repeated failed attempts to kill Castle, Osborn sends Daken and a platoon of H.A.M.M.E.R. troops to complete the mission. After a bloody round of hand-to-hand combat, Daken butchers Castle before kicking his remains from a rooftop. Castle's body parts are collected and spirited away by Moloids, seemingly operating under the protection of Man-Thing. This issue contains a preview of Punisher #11.
- Wolverine was written by Jason Aaron and Esad Ribic. During his tenure as leader of H.A.M.M.E.R., Osborn tries to take control of the World and the Weapon Plus creations. Wolverine and Noh-Varr head to the World to try to stop Osborn, but are soon attacked by a large army of Weapon Plus creations infected by Allgod (Weapon XVI), the living religion. Noh-Varr is rescued by Fantomex, who admits he should have kept an eye on the World. The two of them make their way to the World's brain (now a sentient being) where they are confronted by the Allgod drones, Wolverine included. Noh-Varr is able to disarm Allgod by kissing the World's brain, thus showing it some compassion, and disabling Allgod. Immediately after this, Wolverine regains his senses and the three of them defeat Osborn's invading army of Deathlok prototypes. Fantomex then uses a shrink-ray he reportedly stole from Doctor Doom to shrink the World and take it for his own. This issue contains Jason Aaron's never-before-reprinted first Wolverine story, from Wolverine (first series) #175.
- Spider-Man was written by Dan Slott and Adam Kubert. Peter Parker teams-up with several other members of the Front Line to expose Osborn as a maniac. As Spider-Man, he breaks into Osborn's lab and downloads a video showing Osborn using a live human as a test subject. However, he is caught by Osborn, who was already planning on killing him. Spider-Man escapes, with Osborn chasing him as the Iron Patriot. After a long battle in which Spider-Man is assaulted by his former fans, now adamantly defending Iron Patriot, he is able to damage the Iron Patriot Uni-Beam, whose star-shape was already structurally unsound. While Osborn recovers from the attack, Spider-Man changes back into Peter Parker. As Parker, he is then able to upload the video to all his friends online, who are all either involved in the media or tech-savvy. When Osborn confronts him, prepared to kill him, Parker states that as a taxpaying American citizen who has not broken any laws, Osborn has no legal ground to assault him. Osborn storms off to attempt to suppress the video, claiming he has added another name to his List: Peter Parker. This issue contains the story from The Pulse #5 outing Norman Osborn as the Green Goblin to the world.

== Issues ==
As of November 2009, the following issues had been announced as being part of Dark Reign:

- Agents of Atlas (vol. 2) #1–7
- The Amazing Spider-Man Vol. 2 #595–599
- Avengers: The Initiative #20–25
- Black Panther (vol. 5) #1–6
- Dark Avengers Vol. 1 #1–6
- Dark Avengers: Ares #1–3
- Dark Avengers/Uncanny X-Men: Exodus #1
- Dark Avengers/Uncanny X-Men: Utopia #1
- Dark Reign Files #1
- Dark Reign: The Cabal #1
- Dark Reign: Elektra #1–5
- Dark Reign: Fantastic Four #1–5
- Dark Reign: The Goblin Legacy #1
- Dark Reign: Hawkeye #1–5
- Dark Reign: The Hood #1–5
- Dark Reign: Lethal Legion #1–3
- Dark Reign: The List – Amazing Spider-Man #1
- Dark Reign: The List – Avengers #1
- Dark Reign: The List – Daredevil #1
- Dark Reign: The List – Hulk #1
- Dark Reign: The List – Punisher #1
- Dark Reign: The List – Secret Warriors #1
- Dark Reign: The List – X-Men #1
- Dark Reign: The List – Wolverine #1
- Dark Reign: Made Men #1
- Dark Reign: Mister Negative #1–3
- Dark Reign: New Nation #1
- Dark Reign: Sinister Spider-Man #1–4
- Dark Reign: Young Avengers #1–5
- Dark Reign: Zodiac #1–3
- Dark X-Men: The Beginning #1–3
- Deadpool Vol. 3 #4–12
- Hulk (vol. 2) #13
- The Incredible Hercules #127–129
- The Invincible Iron Man Vol. 1 #8–19
- Marvel Spotlight #37 (also Marvel Spotlight Dark Reign #1)
- The Mighty Avengers Vol. 1 #21–26
- M.O.D.O.K.: Reign Delay #1
- Ms. Marvel (vol. 2) #34–46
- New Avengers Vol. 1 #48–55
- New Avengers: The Reunion #1–4
- Punisher (2009) Vol. 8 #1–6
- All New Savage She-Hulk #1–4
- Secret Invasion: Dark Reign #1
- Secret Invasion: Requiem #1
- Secret Warriors #1–6
- Skrull Kill Krew (vol. 2) #1–5
- Thunderbolts Vol. 1 #128–140
- Uncanny X-Men Vol. 1 #513–514, Annual #2
- War Machine (vol. 2) #1–5 10-12
- Wolverine Vol. 3 #75–79 (shows as Dark Wolverine)
- Wolverine: Origins #33–36
- X-Men: Legacy #226–227
- Doctor Voodoo Avenger of the Supernatural #1-5

Involved, but not listed

- Agents of Atlas (vol. 2) #8–11
- Avengers: The Initiative #26–31
- Black Panther (vol. 5) #7–12
- Captain America (vol. 5) #49–50
- Captain America #600
- Captain America Reborn Prelude
- Captain America Reborn #1–6
- Captain America reborn: Who Will Wield the Shield?
- Captain Britain and MI13 #10–15, Annual #1
- Dark Avengers #9–12 Annual 1
- Dark Wolverine #80-81
- Dark X-Men #1–5
- Dark X-Men: The Confession #1
- Free Comic Book Day Avengers 2009
- Incredible Hulk #601–605
- The Invincible Iron Man #20–24
- Marvel Zombies 4 #1–4
- The Mighty Avengers #27–34
- New Avengers #56–60
- Planet Skaar Prologue #1
- Secret Warriors #7–10
- Skaar: Son of Hulk #11–12
- Spider-Woman #1–7
- SWORD #1–5
- The Torch #1–8
- Thor #600–606
- Thor Giant-Size Finale #1
- Thunderbolts #126–127
- Timestorm 2009–2099 #1–4
- War Machine (vol.2) # 6-9
- Vengeance of Moon Knight #1–6
- Marvel Encyclopedia #1
- Marvel Preview Special Dark Reign Edition #1
- What If? Dark Reign #1

== Aftermath ==
Starting in January 2010, Norman Osborn's reign ended in the "Siege" story arc, which details Osborn's invasion of Asgard and the reunion of the Avengers. This then leads into a new era, called The Heroic Age.

== In other media ==
The plot of Dark Reign was adapted as the twelve Spec-Ops Mission of Marvel: Avengers Alliance. It was also the basis for Marvel Puzzle Quest.

== See also ==
- List of events of the Marvel Universe
