= Nick Fury =

Marvel Comics fictional character

- Nick Fury taken from the cover of Nick Fury, Agent of S.H.I.E.L.D. #4 (September 1968). Art by Jim Steranko.

Publication information
- Publisher: Marvel Comics
- First appearance: Sgt. Fury and his Howling Commandos #1 (May 1963)
- Created by: Stan Lee (writer); Jack Kirby (artist)

In-story information
- Full name: Nicholas Joseph Fury
- Team affiliations: S.H.I.E.L.D.; United States Army Rangers; Howling Commandos; O.S.S./C.I.A.; "Avengers" (1959); Great Wheel; Team White ("Secret Warriors")
- Partnerships: Dum Dum Dugan; Phil Coulson; Maria Hill; Uatu the Watcher
- Notable aliases: Scorpio; Gemini; The Unseen
- Abilities: Master in espionage and intelligence gathering; Highly skilled military strategist; Highly skilled in special operations; Expert hand-to-hand combatant and martial artist; Expert marksman; Longevity via Infinity Formula

Colonel Nicholas Joseph "Nick" Fury Sr. is a fictional character appearing in American comic books published by Marvel Comics. Created by co-plotter/artist Jack Kirby and writer/editor Stan Lee, he first appeared in Sgt. Fury and his Howling Commandos #1 (May 1963), a World War II combat series that portrayed the cigar-chomping sergeant as leader of a U.S. Army Ranger unit.

The modern-day character, initially a CIA agent, debuted a few months later in Fantastic Four #21 (December 1963). In Strange Tales #135 (August 1965), the character was transformed into a James Bond-like spy and leading agent of the fictional espionage agency S.H.I.E.L.D. The character makes frequent appearances in Marvel books as the former head of S.H.I.E.L.D., and as an intermediary between the U.S. government or the United Nations and various superheroes. It is eventually revealed that he takes a special medication called the Infinity Formula that halted his aging and allows him to be active despite being nearly a century old, later leading to him becoming The Unseen, herald of Uatu the Watcher, and forming a new team of Exiles.

Nick Fury appears in multiple animated films, television shows, and video games based on the comics. The character was first portrayed in live-action by David Hasselhoff in the made-for-television film Nick Fury: Agent of S.H.I.E.L.D. (1998). A version of the character appearing in Marvel's 2001 Ultimate Marvel imprint was based on Samuel L. Jackson's appearance and screen persona. When the character was introduced in the Marvel Cinematic Universe in 2008's Iron Man, Jackson was cast in the role, which he has played in eleven films, the first season of Agents of S.H.I.E.L.D. (2013–14), and the Disney+ series What If...? (2021) and Secret Invasion (2023). The recognizability of the character portrayed by Jackson in the films later led Marvel in 2012 to retire the original character from his role with S.H.I.E.L.D., replacing him with his son Nick Fury Jr., who is also patterned on Jackson.

== Publication history ==
=== Sgt. Fury and his Howling Commandos ===
Fury first appeared in the World War II combat series Sgt. Fury and his Howling Commandos, as the cigar-chomping NCO who led a racially and ethnically integrated elite unit. The series ran 167 issues (May 1963 – December 1981), though only in reprints after issue #120 (July 1974). Following several issues by creators Lee and Kirby, penciller Dick Ayers began his long stint on what would be his signature series; John Severin later joined as inker, forming a long-running, critically acclaimed team. Roy Thomas succeeded Lee as writer, followed by Gary Friedrich, who became the writer most closely associated with the series over the years. Annuals featured stories set between World War II and the present, with the "Howlers" fighting in the Korean War and Vietnam War.

During World War II, the Howling Commandos encountered Office of Strategic Services agent Reed Richards (later Mister Fantastic of the Fantastic Four) in #3 (September 1963) and fought alongside Captain America and Bucky in #13 (December 1964).

=== Strange Tales and solo series ===
In Strange Tales #135 (August 1965), Fury, now a colonel, became a James Bond-esque Cold War spy, with Marvel introducing the covert organization S.H.I.E.L.D. (Supreme Headquarters, International Espionage, Law-enforcement Division) and its nemesis, the international criminal organization Hydra.

The 12-page feature was initially created by Lee and Kirby, with the latter supplying such inventive and enduring gadgets and hardware as the Helicarrier – an airborne aircraft carrier – as well as human-replicant LMDs (Life Model Decoys), and even automobile airbags. Lee recalled in 2005:

[T]here was a very popular television show called The Man from U.N.C.L.E., sort of a James Bond type of thing. And I thought, just for fun, I'm going to bring Sgt. Fury back again. But it's now years later and I'm going to make him a colonel, and I'm going to make him the head of an outfit like U.N.C.L.E., a secret military outfit. So I had to think of a name, and I love names, so I came up with the name S.H.I.E.L.D. ... [A]nd I think this was Jack's idea, and it was a wonderful idea – they were headquartered in a floating helicarrier, which was like a super-dirigible.

Writer-penciller-colorist and occasional inker Jim Steranko began working on the feature in Strange Tales #151 (December 1966), initially as a penciller over Kirby layouts. He quickly became one of comic books' most acclaimed and influential artists, establishing S.H.I.E.L.D. as one of comic books' most groundbreaking and innovative features. He borrowed from art movements of the day such as psychedelia and op art; built on Kirby's longstanding work in photomontage; and created comic books' first four-page spread. All the while, he spun plots of intense intrigue, barely hidden sensuality, and hi-fi hipness—and supplied his own version of Bond girls, pushing what was allowable under the Comics Code at the time.

The 12-page feature ran through Strange Tales #168 (sharing the book with the 10-page feature "Doctor Strange" each issue), after which it was spun off into its own series, titled Nick Fury, Agent of S.H.I.E.L.D. It ran 15 issues (June 1968 – November 1969), followed by three all-reprint issues beginning a year later (November 1970 – March 1971). Steranko wrote and drew issues #1–3 and #5 and drew the covers of #1–7.

Fury continued to make appearances in other Marvel books, such as Fantastic Four and The Avengers. In 1972, Sgt. Fury and His Howling Commandos celebrated its 100th issue with a present-day reunion of the squad, sponsored by Stan Lee and the creative team behind the title. (Lee, like other comic books professionals, has made occasional cameos in his own books, in a tradition going back to the 1940s Golden Age of Comic Books). The matter of Fury apparently not aging significantly since his term of service in World War II was justified in "Assignment: The Infinity Formula" by writer Jim Starlin and artist Howard Chaykin in Marvel Spotlight #31 (December 1976), revealing Fury's age-retarding medication treatment.

A six-issue miniseries, Nick Fury vs. S.H.I.E.L.D. (June–November 1988) was followed by Nick Fury, Agent of S.H.I.E.L.D. vol. 2. The latter series lasted 47 issues (September 1989 – May 1993); its pivotal story arc was "the Deltite Affair", in which many S.H.I.E.L.D. agents were replaced with Life Model Decoys in a takeover attempt.

A year after that series ended, the one-shot Fury (May 1994), retroactively altered the events of those previous two series. The Fury one-shot had cast them as a series of staged events designed to distract Fury from the resurrection plans of Hydra head Baron von Strucker. The following year, writer Chaykin and penciller Corky Lehmkuhl produced the four-issue miniseries Fury of S.H.I.E.L.D. (April–July 1995). Various publications have additionally focused on Nick Fury's solo adventures, such as the graphic novels and one-shots Wolverine/Nick Fury: The Scorpio Connection (1989), Wolverine/Nick Fury: Scorpio Rising (October 1994), Fury/Black Widow: Death Duty and Captain America and Nick Fury: Blood Truce (both February 1995), and Captain America and Nick Fury: The Otherworld War (October 2001). He starred in the 2004–2005 Secret War miniseries.

In the 2018 Exiles series "The Unseen" will recruit characters to combat an unknown galactic threat.

In May 2023 Marvel published a double sized one-shot Fury made to commemorate the character's 60th anniversary.

== Fictional character biography ==
=== Early life and wartime ===
Nick Fury as he initially depicted (prior to the loss of his eye) on the cover of Sgt. Fury and His Howling Commandos #12 (November 1964. Art by Jack Kirby.

Nicholas Joseph Fury is the eldest of three children born to Jack Fury in New York City. His father is a United States citizen who enlists in the United Kingdom's Royal Flying Corps during World War I. Jack enlists in 1916 and is stationed in France. He shoots down Manfred von Richthofen early in his flying career and is a highly decorated combat aviator by the end of the war in 1918.

Discharged after the war, Jack returns home, marries an unnamed woman, and becomes the father of three children. Nick, probably born in the late 1910s or early 1920s, is followed by his brother Jake Fury (later the supervillain Scorpio who co-founded the Zodiac cartel), and their sister Dawn.

All three children grow up in the neighborhood known as Hell's Kitchen, Manhattan, New York. Nick is an amateur boxer through the New York City Police Athletic League, where he also learns marksmanship. As a teenager in 1937, he went overseas for the first time to fight with the International Brigades in the Spanish Civil War. He was on leave in Guernica when the fascists bombed it.

After he returns to America, Fury and his friend Red Hargrove leave the neighborhood to pursue their dreams of adventure, eventually settling on a daring wing walking and parachuting act. In the early 1940s, their death-defying stunts catch the attention of Lieutenant Samuel "Happy Sam" Sawyer, who was then training with the British Commandos, who enlists them for a special mission in the Netherlands. Nick and Red later join the U.S. Army, with Fury undergoing basic training under Sergeant Bass. Nick and Red are stationed together at Schofield Barracks, Hawaii when the Imperial Japanese Navy ambushes the base on December 7, 1941. Red is among the many killed in the attack on Pearl Harbor, with Fury swearing vengeance against both the Japanese and the Nazis.

Sawyer, now a captain, assigns Fury command of the First Attack Squad, a unit of U.S. Army Rangers, who are awarded the honorary title of commandos by Winston Churchill after their first missions. They are nicknamed the "Howling Commandos" and stationed at a military base in the United Kingdom to fight specialized missions, primarily but not exclusively in the European Theatre of World War II. During this period, Fury falls in love with a British nurse, Lady Pamela Hawley, who dies in a bombing raid on London before he can propose to her.

=== C.I.A. ===
At the end of World War II in Europe, Fury is severely injured by a land mine in France, and is found and healed by Berthold Sternberg, who uses him as a test subject for his Infinity Formula. After making a full recovery, Fury begins working for the Office of Strategic Services (OSS), precursor of the Central Intelligence Agency (CIA). Six months into his service, he learns the extent of Sternberg's life-saving operation: the Infinity Formula has stopped his aging, but if he does not receive annual doses, he will age rapidly and die. The doctor begins a 30-year period of extorting large sums of money from Fury in exchange for the injections.

Fury segues into the CIA as an espionage agent, gathering information in Korea. During this time the Howling Commandos are reformed, and Fury receives a battlefield commission to lieutenant. He later reaches the rank of colonel. During this time, he recommends the recruitment of married agents Richard and Mary Parker, who will go on to become the parents of Fury's occasional superhero ally Spider-Man. Much later, the CIA uses him as a liaison to various super-powered groups that have begun appearing, including the Fantastic Four, whom CIA agent Fury first encounters in Fantastic Four #21 (Dec. 1963).

During his time with the CIA, Fury begins wearing his trademark eyepatch. Sgt. Fury #27 (Feb. 1966) revealed that he had taken shrapnel to one eye during World War II, which caused him to slowly lose sight in it over the course of years.

=== S.H.I.E.L.D. ===
Fury becomes the second commander of S.H.I.E.L.D. as its public director. The ultimate authority of S.H.I.E.L.D. is revealed to be a cabal of 12 mysterious men and women who give Fury his orders and operational structure, leaving Fury to manage the actual implementation of these orders and stratagems. The identities of these people have never been revealed; they appear only as shadowy figures on monitors. Initially, his organization's primary nemesis is the international terrorist organization Hydra, later revealed to have been created by Fury's worst enemy of World War II, Baron Wolfgang von Strucker. Under Fury, S.H.I.E.L.D. grows into one of the world's most powerful organizations, reaching covertly into national governments and forming strategic alliances with the Avengers and other superhero groups, while always maintaining independence and deniability. Fury soon becomes the superhero community's main contact when government-related information is required in order to deal with a crisis.

After years at the helm, Fury discovers that S.H.I.E.L.D. and Hydra have both fallen under the control of a group of sentient Life Model Decoy androids known as Deltites. Betrayed, Fury goes underground and is hunted by his fellow agents, many of whom are later revealed to have been replaced with Deltites. Although Fury ultimately exposes and overcomes the Deltite threat, the conflict is so destructive to S.H.I.E.L.D.'s personnel and infrastructure, and leaves Fury so disillusioned, that he disbands the agency to prevent it from again being subverted from within.

Fury rebuilds S.H.I.E.L.D. from the ground up, initially as a more streamlined agency small enough for him to personally oversee and protect from being corrupted. This new incarnation changed the acronym to stand for "Strategic Hazard Intervention, Espionage and Logistics Directorate".

Sometime later, Frank Castle, the vigilante known as the Punisher, is captured and sent to a maximum-security facility with a S.H.I.E.L.D. escort. During a hypnosis session with Doc Samson, a character named Spook interferes with the session and has the Punisher conditioned to believe Fury is responsible for the murder of the Punisher's family. An escaped Punisher eventually kills Fury, who is buried at Arlington National Cemetery. The Fury that the Punisher has "killed" is later revealed to have been a highly advanced Life Model Decoy android.

Returned to his post as S.H.I.E.L.D. director, Fury independently enlists the superheroes Captain America, Spider-Man, Luke Cage, Wolverine, Daredevil, and the Black Widow to launch a covert assault on the leadership of Latveria, which is plotting a massive attack on the U.S. One year afterward, Latveria launches a counterattack that results in Fury's removal as S.H.I.E.L.D. commander, forcing him again into hiding with numerous international warrants out for his arrest. His successors as director of S.H.I.E.L.D. are first Maria Hill and then Tony Stark. Both Hill and Stark, keeping Fury's disappearance secret from the S.H.I.E.L.D. rank and file, use Life Model Decoys to impersonate Fury on occasion.

Fury is the only "33rd-degree" S.H.I.E.L.D. officer (meaning he is the only member of S.H.I.E.L.D., present or past, to know of the existence of 28 emergency, covert bases scattered across the globe) secretly providing the anti-registration faction in the subsequent superhuman civil war with bases where they can rally their forces without worrying about their Pro-Registration enemies finding them.

=== Secret Invasion ===
During the time Fury spends in hiding, he learns that Valentina Allegra de Fontaine has been plotting to extract S.H.I.E.L.D. passcodes from him and kill him. Fury kills her first, after which she reverts to the form of an extraterrestrial shapeshifter from the hostile Skrull race, which has mounted an invasion of Earth. He recruits Spider-Woman to be his mole inside both Hydra and S.H.I.E.L.D., and to watch for further Skrull impostors. Unbeknownst to him, she's replaced shortly after by Skrull Queen Veranke herself. He later instructs former S.H.I.E.L.D. agent Daisy Johnson to recruit superpowered children of various heroes and villains to help combat the Skrull invasion; these include Phobos, the 10-year-old son of Ares and himself the young god of fear; Yo-Yo, a misunderstood mutant speedster; Hellfire, a relative of Phantom Rider with supernatural powers; Druid, a magician and son of Doctor Druid; and Stonewall, a young man who can grow bigger at will and has super strength. Fury dubs them his "Commandos".

Soon after the attack on Earth, Fury and his new team are seen counter-attacking the Skrull attack in Times Square, Manhattan. They manage to repel and kill the invaders in the area significantly, whilst saving the downed Initiative cadets and the Young Avengers. He, along with his team and the rescued heroes, are next seen working and planning their next move in one of the scattered 28 covert S.H.I.E.L.D. bases. He has been seen talking to Deadpool, while Deadpool was on a Skrull ship after pretending to join them. It is revealed that Fury hired Deadpool to infiltrate Skrull ranks by pretending to defect, with the intention of obtaining biological information of the Skrulls that Fury can use to stop them. When Deadpool attempts to transmit the data, it is intercepted by Norman Osborn.

Fury leads the survivors of the Young Avengers and Initiative back to the fight in New York, where they are joined by Thor, the new Captain America, the New Avengers and the Mighty Avengers, the Hood's gang, and the Thunderbolts, to take on Veranke's army of Super Skrulls.

=== Dark Reign and Secret Warriors ===
During an infiltration and elimination of a covert S.H.I.E.L.D. base in Chicago, Fury discovers that S.H.I.E.L.D. is, and always has been, secretly controlled by Hydra. A distraught Fury now plans to use his Secret Warriors to combat the renewed Hydra threat, spearheaded by his old nemesis, Baron Strucker. He hires the new Howling Commandos, a private military company formed by 1200 former S.H.I.E.L.D. agents who refused to join Norman Osborn's H.A.M.M.E.R., to employ them in his fight against Hydra and Osborn. He has a number of inside men to assist in his raids, including Natasha Romanova posing as Yelena Belova who is in command of the Thunderbolts. Eventually, he and his men commandeer decommissioned Helicarriers, as well as forcing the H.A.M.M.E.R. agents at the dock to follow him. Natasha brings Songbird to Fury, but she is followed and the three are captured by the Thunderbolts. Osborn then shoots Fury in the head. It was not the real Fury who was shot, but a Life Model Decoy in his image, which the Fixer reveals to Songbird and Black Widow later after they escape the Thunderbolts.

On a solo mission soon after, Fury teams with Norman Osborn to interrogate a lower-level H.A.M.M.E.R. agent. The conversation (and materials obtained afterwards) reveal there may be an organization much like Hydra, installed in the upper levels of world governments, called "Leviathan". This organization appears to have been founded by the Soviet government for reasons as yet unclear. Fury later introduces Daisy Johnson to prominent members of the Howling Commandos including Alexander Pierce, leader of the second caterpillar team, and Mikel, Fury's son and leader of the "gray" team.

=== Siege ===
Fury and the Secret Warriors are later summoned by Captain America to his hideout along with the New and Young Avengers, when Rogers, seeking to aid his long-time comrade Thor in his plight during the Siege of Asgard launched by Norman Osborn, gathered all his allies to strike back against Osborn and rescue Thor whilst simultaneously ending Osborn's Dark Reign. Fury insists on Phobos remaining behind due to an unwillingness for him to battle his father Ares and his youth, and later opens a wormhole aboard an ex-S.H.I.E.L.D. jet which brings the combined forces of the three teams to Oklahoma. They then intercept Norman Osborn's siege and with the help of Iron Man, who receives a variation of his suit from Speed, they shut down Norman's suit. Their victory is cut short when Sentry, now fully possessed by the Void, begins attacking them. Loki attempts to help Fury and the other heroes by empowering them with the Norn Stones, but Void kills him before long. Iron Man then uses the ex-S.H.I.E.L.D. Helicarrier as a bullet on the Void. Robert Reynolds regains control of his body and begs the Avengers to kill him. Thor refuses but ends up killing him anyway when Void begins to take over again. The Avengers are reunited, and the press declares that a new "Heroic Age" has begun.

=== Heroic Age ===
While Fury remains underground, allowing Steve Rogers to take official command of the super-spy side of things, he remains in contact with Earth's heroes and monitors their activities. He provides the New Avengers with a special serum, created as a combination of the Super-Soldier serum and the Infinity Formula, to help Mockingbird when she was shot during a raid on a H.A.M.M.E.R. base. Fury later expends the last sample of the Infinity Formula to save Bucky's life. He remains immortal due to trace amounts of the formula in his body.

=== Battle Scars ===
In 2012, the six-part series Battle Scars introduces Nick Fury's secret son, Sgt. Marcus Johnson who is an African American and ends up losing one eye in the series. The character has been described as looking like Samuel L. Jackson, just as the Nick Fury of the Ultimate Marvel universe does. Nick Fury retires at the end of the series, and his son joins S.H.I.E.L.D. Upon joining S.H.I.E.L.D., Johnson changes his name to his original birth name of Nick Fury Jr., as he and Phil Coulson appear on the Helicarrier in the final page.

=== Original Sin ===
During the Original Sin storyline, Nick Fury is called upon to help investigate the murder of Uatu the Watcher. Fury is attacked and beheaded by the Winter Soldier. When the investigating teams – including Black Panther, Emma Frost, Doctor Strange and the Punisher – attempt to pursue Bucky, they find a space station of unknown origin. "Fury" is revealed to be a highly advanced Life Model Decoy, with the space station containing the real, elderly, Nick Fury and several LMDs. Fury relates an account from 1958, when as a member of U.S. Army Intelligence, he encountered an invasion of alien Tribellians in Kansas. He witnessed Woodrow McCord destroying the home planet of the aliens, before himself being fatally injured. When McCord's partner Howard Stark arrived on the scene, he decided to recruit Fury to continue his work as defender of the planet. Nick Fury accepted and explains that over the decades he defended the Earth against threats through virtually any means whatsoever, including systematic torture against aliens, genocide against planetary civilizations, and warmongering spanning entire galaxies. The corpses discovered recently by the superhero investigators were threats that Fury had neutralized. Fury reveals that he has rapidly grown elderly and is dying because the Infinity Formula in his body has been depleted. He explains that he chose each of the heroes assembled so that one of them can replace him. His refusal to answer the Black Panther's demand for an explanation of what happened to Uatu leads to a battle between the heroes and the LMDs, during which Fury activates Uatu's eyes. Fury fights off most of the attacking heroes – including revealing an undisclosed secret to Thor that causes him to lose the ability to wield his hammer. Fury confesses that he killed Uatu in potential self-defense after Doctor Midas and Orb had first attacked him. Fury took one of Uatu's eyes, needing to know who mounted the assault and Uatu's oath preventing him from revealing that information directly. After killing Midas, Fury is shown wandering the Moon in chains and wearing long robes that hide his face from view and unable to interfere as "The Unseen", becoming Uatu's replacement while the Winter Soldier takes his place as Earth's "Man on the Wall".

=== The Unseen ===
Following the continuity-changing events of the 2015 miniseries Secret Wars, Fury returns as "the Unseen", advising Odinson of the existence of another hammer. He muses later that, while he is essentially another person from Nick Fury now, he still retains Fury's regret at destroying Thor with a whisper, hoping that the news of the new hammer will help Odinson recover what he once was. Odinson also admits that the secret that made him unworthy was "Gorr was right", referencing how Gorr the God-Butcher believed that no gods were worthy of worship, although Odinson's ally Beta Ray Bill assures him that his willingness to continue fighting for others proves that this does not apply to Odinson.

=== Empyre ===
Following the events of "Empyre", the Unseen retrieves ancient weapons from the First Race, predating the Elders of the Universe, Asgardians, and Celestials. Examining them, the Unseen discovers their origin and is overwhelmed with energy as Uatu is resurrected.

While reconstructing his home, Uatu learns of how Nick Fury became the Unseen using the Cyclopedia Universum. It revealed that three of Uatu's brothers and sisters broke their non-interference vow by judging Nick Fury and fusing him with Uatu's remains before chaining him to a rock. After learning this, Uatu releases Fury from his chains and makes him his herald.

=== Reckoning War ===
In the storyline "Reckoning War", Fury and Uatu meet up with Mister Fantastic to inform them about the Reckoning. When Uatu tries to appeal to the other Watchers for help, he is condemned to repeatedly watch the "What If" scenario he never looked at himself in the form of a world where he never interfered by alerting the Fantastic Four to the coming of Galactus, which ended with the team defeating Galactus on their own. Fury reveals to Uatu that the vision he was shown ended just before the energy generator created by Mister Fantastic overloaded and destroyed the universe, leaving Uatu shaken but assured that his interference was right after all.

== Powers and abilities ==
Nick Fury's aging was slowed greatly by the Infinity Formula, a serum created by Dr. Berthold Sternberg. Fury was first inoculated with the serum in the 1940s, and continued to take it for many years. Originally Fury had to take the formula annually or the effects would be reversed, allowing his body to reach its actual chronological age. Fury is depicted as an active athletic man despite his advanced chronological age, though writers have sometimes portrayed Fury as being past his prime despite the Infinity Formula as in the Fury and Wolverine graphic novel. In the "Original Sin" story arc, it is revealed that the Infinity Formula stopped working at some point and Fury has only pretended to stop aging by using LMDs.

Fury's injured left eye, though initially minimally affected by a grenade blast during World War II, has over the decades resulted in a 95% loss of vision in this eye. Despite some comments to the contrary, Fury has not had the eye removed, nor bionically enhanced, and he merely covers it with a cosmetic eye-patch to prevent depth perception distortion. He has explained that when needing to disguise himself, he only needs to remove the eyepatch, slip in a contact lens and darken his hair to avoid standing out.

Fury is a seasoned unarmed and armed combat expert, was a heavyweight boxer in the army (during World War II) and holds a black belt in Tae Kwon Do and a brown belt in Jiu Jitsu. He has further honed his unarmed combat skills sparring with Captain America. The character is a combat veteran of three wars, World War II, the Korean War, and the Vietnam War, as well as numerous "military adviser" missions and clandestine operations ("a dozen conflicts you've never even heard of"). He is trained as a paratrooper, Ranger, a demolitions expert, vehicle specialist (including aircraft and seagoing vessels), and a Green Beret.

=== Equipment ===
Fury has access to a wide variety of equipment and weaponry designed by S.H.I.E.L.D. technicians. He wears a S.H.I.E.L.D. uniform made of 9-ply Kevlar (able to withstand ballistic impact up to .45 caliber bullets) and a Beta cloth (type C), a fire-resistant material, which has a kindling temperature of 1,700 °F (930 °C). Fury uses various types of handguns, including a .15 caliber needle gun, a government issue .45 caliber automatic, a captured German Luger in 9mm Parabellum, a modified semi-automatic Walther PPK in 9 mm Parabellum, and the Ingram MAC-10 machine pistol in .45 ACP.

As the director of S.H.I.E.L.D., Fury has access to the entire S.H.I.E.L.D. highly advanced arsenal of weaponry; various air, land, and sea craft provided by S.H.I.E.L.D.; and numerous S.H.I.E.L.D. paraphernalia, including a radio-link tie and a bulletproof suit. Due to his high-ranking status, even when S.H.I.E.L.D. is directed by Tony Stark, Norman Osborn and Steve Rogers, Fury retains access to several S.H.I.E.L.D. warehouses and paraphernalia that are unknown to anyone else but him.

== Other versions ==
=== 1602 ===
An alternate universe version of Nick Fury appears in Marvel 1602. This version is Nicholas Fury, Queen Elizabeth I's chief of intelligence. Fury is modeled after Francis Walsingham, a real spymaster who worked for Elizabeth.

=== Avataars ===
An alternate universe version of Nick Fury appears in Avataars: Covenant of the Shield. This version is Regent Nicholas, guardian of the throne of Avalon.

=== Deadpool Merc with a Mouth ===
An alternate universe version of Nick Fury appears in Deadpool: Merc with a Mouth. This version is the sheriff of a town in a universe where the Wild West still exists.

=== Earth X ===
An alternate universe version of Nick Fury appears in Earth X . This version died under unknown circumstances, with a series of Life Model Decoys based on him being used.

=== Ennis ===
An alternate universe version of Nick Fury appears in the Max imprint. This version is a veteran of World War II and the Cold War. The 2012 sequel series Fury: My War Gone By follows Fury in the 1960s as he becomes involved in anti-Communist military action in Vietnam and Cuba. The 2006 prequel miniseries Fury: Peacemaker follows Fury during World War II as he works with the Special Air Service.

=== House of M ===
An alternate universe version of Nick Fury appears in House of M. This version is a drill instructor who was kept around in spite of the mutant-dominated society because his skills were considered valuable. Fury is apparently killed by a trap set one of his soldiers, Earshot.

=== Marvel Zombies ===
In Marvel Zombies, Nick Fury organizes a resistance against the zombies but is eventually devoured by the zombified Fantastic Four on the Helicarrier. Shortly before he dies, Fury orders Thor to destroy the teleporter built by Tony Stark, preventing the Fantastic Four from escaping their universe.

=== Mutant X ===
An alternate universe version of Nick Fury appears in Mutant X. This version is the leader of S.H.I.E.L.D., an anti-mutant policing organization.

=== Ruins ===
An alternate universe version of Nick Fury appears in Ruins. This version is a government agent stationed in Washington, D.C., which had fallen into a state of disrepair after "President X" moved the White House to New York. He meets Philip Sheldon, who asked for an interview for a book he was writing. Fury assaults Sheldon, thinking he is a political writer, and claims to be a cannibal. Shortly afterward, Fury kills Jean Grey before killing himself.

=== Ultimate Marvel ===
Nick Fury in the alternate-universe imprint Ultimate Marvel.

An alternate universe version of Nick Fury appears in the Ultimate Marvel universe. This version is African American, was born in Huntsville, Alabama, and is a veteran of World War II and the Kosovo War. His appearance and personality are modeled on actor Samuel L. Jackson, who went on to play the live-action adaptation of Fury in the Marvel Cinematic Universe.

Fury becomes the director of S.H.I.E.L.D. and is tasked with forming a team to battle posthuman threats and resurrecting the supersoldier program, two objectives that resulted in the formation of the Ultimates. Fury operates as the commander of the team, at times leading them into action, though he often shares duties with Captain America and Iron Man.

=== Ultimate Universe ===
An alternate universe version of Nick Fury appears in the Ultimate Universe imprint. This version is a series of Life Model Decoys who work as the director of H.A.N.D. (Heroic Anomaly Neutralization Directorate), implied to be a reorganized S.H.I.E.L.D after a takeover of the Hand. The fate of the original Fury is left unknown.

== Reception ==
In 2011, Fury was ranked 33rd in IGN's "Top 100 Comic Book Heroes", and 32nd in their list of "The Top 50 Avengers".

== Collected editions ==
=== Sgt. Fury and his Howling Commandos ===
- Marvel Masterworks: Sgt. Fury
  - Vol. 1 collects Sgt. Fury and his Howling Commandos #1–13, 320 pages, February 2006, ISBN 978-0-7851-2039-1
  - Vol. 2 collects Sgt. Fury and his Howling Commandos #14–23 and Annual #1, 240 pages, June 2008, ISBN 978-0-7851-2928-8
  - Vol. 3 collects Sgt. Fury and his Howling Commandos #24–32 and 'Annual #2, 224 pages, August 2010, ISBN 978-0-7851-4212-6
- Essential Sgt Fury Vol. 1 collects Sgt. Fury and his Howling Commandos #1–23 and Annual #1, 544 pages, November 2011, ISBN 978-0-7851-6395-4

=== Strange Tales / Nick Fury, Agent of S.H.I.E.L.D. ===
- Son of Origins of Marvel Comics includes Nick Fury, Agent of S.H.I.E.L.D. story from Strange Tales #135, 249 pages, October 1975, ISBN 978-0-671-22166-9
- Marvel Masterworks: Nick Fury, Agent of S.H.I.E.L.D.
  - Vol. 1 collects Strange Tales #135–153, Tales of Suspense #78, and Fantastic Four #21, 288 pages, September 2007, ISBN 978-0-7851-2686-7
  - Vol. 2 collects Strange Tales #154–168 and Nick Fury, Agent of S.H.I.E.L.D. #1–3, 272 pages, December 2009, ISBN 978-0-7851-3503-6
  - Vol. 3 collects Nick Fury, Agent of S.H.I.E.L.D. #4–15, The Avengers #72, and Marvel Spotlight #31, 320 pages, December 2011, ISBN 978-0-7851-5034-3
- S.H.I.E.L.D.: The Complete Collection Omnibus collects Strange Tales #135–168, Nick Fury, Agent of S.H.I.E.L.D. #1–15, Fantastic Four #21, Tales of Suspense #78, The Avengers #72, and Marvel Spotlight #31, 960 pages, October 2015, ISBN 978-0-7851-9852-9

=== Nick Fury vs. S.H.I.E.L.D. ===
- Marvel Comics Presents: Nick Fury vs. S.H.I.E.L.D. collects Nick Fury vs. S.H.I.E.L.D. #1–6, 1989
- S.H.I.E.L.D.: Nick Fury vs. S.H.I.E.L.D. collects Nick Fury vs. S.H.I.E.L.D. #1–6, 304 pages, December 2011, ISBN 978-0-7851-5901-8

=== Nick Fury, Agent of S.H.I.E.L.D. vol. 3 ===
- Nick Fury, Agent of S.H.I.E.L.D. Classic
  - Vol. 1 collects Nick Fury, Agent of S.H.I.E.L.D. vol. 3 #1–11, 272 pages, July 2012, ISBN 978-0-7851-6064-9
  - Vol. 2 collects Nick Fury, Agent of S.H.I.E.L.D. vol. 3 #12–23, 288 pages, February 2015, ISBN 978-0-7851-9345-6
  - Vol. 3 collects Nick Fury, Agent of S.H.I.E.L.D. vol. 3 #24–35, 292 pages, June 2015, ISBN 978-0-7851-9408-8
- S.H.I.E.L.D.: Hydra Reborn collects Nick Fury, Agent of S.H.I.E.L.D. vol. 3 #36–47, 352 pages, August 2017, ISBN 978-1-3029-0684-9

=== Secret Warriors ===
- Secret Warriors Vol. 1: Nick Fury, Agent of Nothing collects Secret Warriors #1–6, 184 pages, September 2009, ISBN 978-0-7851-3999-7

== See also ==
- Nick's World
- Nick Fury's Howling Commandos
