= List of fictional secret police and intelligence organizations =

This is a list of secret police organisations and intelligence agencies which are fictional: The list is not exhaustive.

== Contemporary world ==
Agency	Info	Source	Source type
13th Bureau	Intelligence and secret police arm of the Yellow Empire	Blake and Mortimer	Comics
ACME	Intelligence agency	Carmen Sandiego	TV
The Agency	Intelligence agency	Scarecrow and Mrs. King	TV
The Agency	Oversight and Sections (including Section One)	La Femme Nikita	TV
Alliance of Twelve		Alias	TV
Federal Disaster Response Agency (FEDRA)	A disaster response agency in United States similar to FEMA that took over USA in military coup, forcing the citizens of the country to live under constant surveillance and hard labor.	The Last of Us	Video game
Alpha Protocol	A clandestine United States agency which has unlimited resources to conduct covert operations on behalf of the government	Alpha Protocol	Video game
B613	B613 was a covert government agency formerly run by Rowan, then by Jake Ballard, then Olivia Pope, then by Ballard once more before being shut down.	Scandal	TV
Canadian National Intelligence Agency (NISA)		InSecurity	TV
Carrington Institute		Perfect Dark	Video game
Chapter	A secret organization within the US government that carries out assassinations	The Long Kiss Goodnight	Film
Chinese Secret Police (CSP)		Alpha Protocol	Video game
CONTROL	Spy agency	Get Smart	TV
C.O.P.S.	Central Organization of Police Specialists	C.O.P.S.	Animated TV
Counter Terrorist Unit		24	TV
C.O.V.N.E.T		Muppets from Space	Film
C.R.A.S.H. (LSPD)	A unit of the in-game Los Santos Police Department (LSPD), the Community Resources Against Street Hoodlums is a parody of its real-life counterpart as a unit of the Los Angeles Police Department(LAPD).	Grand Theft Auto: San Andreas	Video game
Cubicle Gestapo		Dilbert	Comic
CURE	American intelligence and assassination organization (Although capitalized, the name does not appear to be an acronym)	The Destroyer	Novels
CHERUB	Intelligence agency that employs children	CHERUB	Book Series
Division	Secret black-ops branch of the government	Nikita	TV
The Division		Marathon Man	Novel and film
DVX	Eastern Europe and Asian-aligned espionage and "black ops" agency, also dabbles in organized crime and the personal financial ambitions of its leaders	General Hospital	TV
DXS	Department of External Security	MacGyver	TV
Earth Force Enforcement Force	American agency responsible for protecting the Earth from alien threats	Kid Cosmic	TV
Earth Protection Force		Teenage Mutant Ninja Turtles	TV
Federal Bureau of Control (FBC)	A secret U.S. government agency tasked with containing and studying phenomena which violate the laws of reality	Control	Video game
Federal Bureau of Intervention (FBI)	Fictionalized version of the FBI	Payday: The Heist and PAYDAY 2	Video game
Federal Investigation Bureau (FIB)	Parody of the FBI.	Grand Theft Auto IV and V	Video game
F.I.R.M.	A division of the CIA	Airwolf	TV
FLAG	Foundation for Law and Government	Knight Rider	TV
Fourth Echelon		Splinter Cell	Video game
G.R.U. Division Psychotronics (GRU-P)	A division of the Soviet Union's Main Intelligence Directorate dealing in the research and elimination of paranormal phenomenon.	SCP Foundation	Website
International Affairs Agency (IAA)	Parody of the CIA.	Grand Theft Auto V	Video game
International Security Alliance (ISA)	Spy agency that also dabbles in law enforcement, sort of a blend of the FBI and CIA	Days of Our Lives	TV
Immigration and Customs Security		The Border	TV
IMF	Impossible Missions Force	Mission Impossible	Television and film
ISIS	International Secret Intelligence Service	Archer	Animated TV
Kingsman	Independent international intelligence agency	Kingsman	Franchise
M.A.T.A		EJEN ALI THE MOVIE MISI:NEO	Film
Ministry of Alien Detection		A Shaun the Sheep Movie: Farmageddon	Film
Ministry of Top Secret Information (TSI)	UK Government Department	The Avengers	TV
N.O.O.S.E.	National Office Of Security Enforcement. Parody of the SWAT, NSA and USBP.	Grand Theft Auto IV and V	Video game
NSE	National Security Executive	Second Sight	Video Game
ODIN	Organization of Democratic Intelligence Networks	Archer	Animated TV
Office of Scientific Intelligence (OSI)		The Six Million Dollar Man; The Bionic Woman	TV
Omega Sector	Counter-terrorism task force	True Lies	Film
Phantom Alliance	Eastern-aligned group of specially-trained spies and assassins	Days of Our Lives	TV
Rainbow	Multi-national counter-terrorism task force	Rainbow Six	Novel, Video game
Section 13		Jackie Chan Adventures	TV
Sheriff's Secret Police		Welcome to Night Vale	Podcast
SMERSH		James Bond	Novels and films
S.T.A.R.S.	A police task-force similar to SWAT	Resident Evil	Video game
Strategic Homeland Division (SHD)	A semi-autonomous network of sleeper agents tasked with preserving continuity of government in the event of a major catastrophe.	Tom Clancy's The Division	Video game
SSS	State Security Service. Secret Police operating in fictional country of Ostania. Parody of the Stasi.	Spy × Family	Manga and anime
The Patriots; The Philosophers		Metal Gear	Video game
Third Echelon		Splinter Cell	Video game
T.I.A.	Técnicos de Investigación Aeroterráquea ("Aeroterrestrial Investigation Technicians")	Mort & Phil	Comics
T.H.R.U.S.H.	Technological Hierarchy for the Removal of Undesirables and the Subjugation of Humanity	The Man from U.N.C.L.E.	TV
The Tribunal	Also called The Council	Metalocalypse	TV
U.N.C.L.E.	United Network Command for Law and Enforcement	The Man from U.N.C.L.E.	TV
United Nations Global Occult Coalition (UNGOC)	A clandestine division of the United Nations responsible for locating and eliminating paranormal threats.	SCP Foundation	Website
United Liberty Paper	Possibly a division of the IAA	Grand Theft Auto IV	Video game
V.S.S.E.	Vital Situation Swift Execution	Time Crisis	Video game
WOOHP	World Organization Of Human Protection	Totally Spies	Animation
World Security Bureau (WSB)	Western/NATO-aligned espionage and "black ops" agency; susceptible to corruption	General Hospital	TV
XXX		xXx	Film
ZEP	Secret police of Taschist Borduria	The Adventures of Tintin	Comics
Z.O.W.I.E.	Zonal Organization of World Intelligence and Espionage	Derek Flint spy sendups	Franchise

=== Notes ===
1.Rainbow originates from the novel, however it is much more widely known from the video games loosely based on the novel.

== Comics ==
Agency	Info	Source	Source type
A.R.G.U.S.	Advanced Research Group Uniting Super-Humans (comics); Advanced Research Group United Support (TV); Sub-agency of U.S. Homeland Security	DC Universe (New 52); Arrowverse; DC Extended Universe; DC Universe)	Comics; TV series Films
Canadian International Security Organization (CISO)		Captain Canuck	Comic series
Checkmate		DC Universe	Comics
Department of Affairs Mutants	United States executive department in charge of controlling mutant activity which is led by mutant scientist Hank McCoy.	X-Men Cinematic Universe	Film
Damage Control	United States executive department in charge of contain enhanced damage.	Marvel Comics, Marvel Cinematic Universe	Comics, film
D.E.O	Department of Extranormal Operations	Arrowverse; DC Universe	Comics TV series
Department H	Fictional superhuman affairs branch of Canada's Department of National Defence	Marvel Universe; Marvel Cinematic Universe	Comics
Green Lantern Corps	Galactic military parapolice who protect the universe from various threats using power rings fueled by the emotion of valor.	DC Universe; Green Lantern; DC Extended Universe	Comics; TV series Films Video game
Hatut Zeraze	Wakandan Secret police composed of assassins and covert operations. Known for using vibranium based habits similar the Black Panther's habit and for advanced science and mysticism to enhance cloaking abilities	Marvel Comics	Comics
I.O.	International Operations	Wildstorm	Comics
Nova Corps	Marvel Universe intergalactic military and police force	Marvel Universe; Marvel Cinematic Universe	Comics TV series Films Video game
Science Police	Law enforcement agency of the United Planets during the 30th and 31st centuries. The Science Police are headquartered on Earth, with divisions on the planets that make up the UP.	DC Universe	Comics
Time Variance Authority	Bureaucratic agency that protects the timelines of the multiverse from its own alterations.	Marvel Universe; Marvel Cinematic Universe	Comics; TV series
Q.I.A.	Quinpar Intelligence Agency	Sign Gene	Film
S.H.I.E.L.D.	Strategic Hazard Intervention Espionage Logistics Directorate (comics); Strategic Homeland Intervention, Enforcement and Logistics Division (Cinematic); Fictional espionage, law-enforcement, and counter-terrorism agency	Marvel Universe; Marvel Cinematic Universe	Comics; Film
S.T.R.I.K.E.	Special Tactical Reserve for International Key Emergencies; Fictional comic book counter-terrorism and intelligence agency that often deals with superhuman threats	Marvel Universe; Marvel Cinematic Universe	Comics
S.W.O.R.D.	Sentient World Observation and Response Department; A fictional counterterrorism and intelligence agency to deal with extraterrestrial threats to world security.	Marvel Universe Marvel Cinematic Universe	Comics; TV series
Unit 7	Of Progressive Allied Canadian Technologies (PACT) Corporation	Northguard	Comic book

== Science fiction ==
Agency	Info	Source	Source type
Black Priests	Kzin	Larry Niven's Known Space series	Book
Blue Rose	Top secret joint task force of the U. S. military and Federal Bureau of Investigation that investigates cases of a paranormal nature, including doppelgangers, mysterious disappearances and the Black and White Lodges.	Twin Peaks	TV series and film
Bureau of Grossology	Secret organization entrusted with the prevention of gross or disgusting crimes	Grossology	Animated TV
Civil Protection	Armed police force dedicated to enforcing the Combine's rule over Earth.	Half-Life 2	Videogame
Confederate Secret Service		Captain Confederacy	Comic series
Decepticon Justice Division	Division of Decepticon armed forces tasked with punishing desertion and enforcing Megatron's directives and ideology.	The Transformers: More than Meets the Eye	Comic series
The Forge		Doctor Who	audio plays
GOTT ES Members		Kiddy Grade	Anime
Imperial Interstellar Scout Service	Originally an exploratory agency, also has some espionage, military, police, diplomatic, and internal communications functions in the Third Imperium. Notable for carrying out operations in undiscovered or unsettled regions.	Traveller	Role playing game
ImpSec	Imperial intelligence, counterintelligence, and paramilitary police of the Barrayaran Imperium. An acronym of "Imperial Security." Employer of the primary protagonist, Miles Vorkosigan.	Lois McMaster Bujold's Vorkosigan Saga	Books
Men in Black	The Men in Black are an agency tasked with keeping the existence of aliens secret.	Men in Black	Franchise
NID	National Intelligence Department	Stargate SG-1; Stargate Atlantis	TV
Nightwatch	Earth Alliance secret police	Babylon 5	TV
Office of Homeworld Security/Homeworld Command		Stargate SG-1; Stargate Atlantis	TV
Office of Naval Intelligence		Halo	Videogame
Office of State Security (StateSec or SS)	An arm of the People's Republic of Haven	David Weber's Honorverse	Book
The Office of Unspecified Services		Infinite Jest	Book
Psi Corps	Earth Alliance secret police composed of telepaths, often working in tandem with the Nightwatch.	Babylon 5	TV
Public Security Section 9	Federal Security agency and armed branch of the Ministry of Home Affairs	Ghost in the Shell	Manga & Anime
SHADO	Supreme Headquarters, Alien Defence Organisation	UFO	TV
Special Circumstances		Iain M. Banks's Culture	Book
Special Tactics and Reconnaissance ("Spectres")	Autonomous agents of the Citadel Council with extraordinary authority and leeway	Mass Effect	Videogame
Special Tasks Group (STG)	Special forces of the Salarian Union; organizational structure likely inspired the Citadel Council's Spectre unit	Mass Effect	Videogame
Section 7	An intelligence organization run by the UEO. Captain Oliver Hudson referred to them as "Gestapo bastards.". The older patches read "Sector 7" instead of "Section 7", leading some to believe this to be their original name.	seaQuest DSV	TV
Sector 7	Intelligence organization. They discovered the All Spark and built the Hoover Dam around it to mask the energy emitted by the Cube	Transformers	Film
TENET	A secret organization that uses time inversion to perform temporal pincer movements.	Tenet	Film
Time Enforcement Commission	A law enforcement organisation that regulates time travel	Timecop	Franchise
Torchwood Institute	A secret organization set up by Queen Victoria in 1879 to combat alien threat	Doctor Who; Torchwood	TV
UNIT	Unified Intelligence Taskforce. A military organization operating under the auspices of the United Nations, its purpose is to investigate and combat Paranormal and Extraterrestrial threats to Earth.	Doctor Who; Torchwood; The Sarah Jane Adventures	TV

=== Dystopian futures ===
Agency	Info	Source	Source type
The Dogs	Fictional representation of the KGB (Komitet Gosudarstvennoy Bezopasnosti) personified by a pack of vicious dogs	George Orwell's Animal Farm	Book
The Finger	Secret police of Norsefire, the fascist government of England	V for Vendetta comic and film adaption	Comic and Film
Ministry of Information (MOI)	The secret police of Arstotzka.	Papers, Please	Video game
Grammaton Clerics		Equilibrium	Film
Inquisition	Imperial secret police of the Imperium of Man similar to the Spanish Inquisition	Warhammer 40,000	Miniature wargame
Majestic 12		Deus Ex	Video game
Officio Assassinorum	Imperial organization of assassins dispatched to remove both internal and external threats of the Imperium of Man	Warhammer 40,000	Miniature wargame
Special Circumstances		Scott Westerfeld's Uglies series	Book
Thought Police	Police that monitor people's body language and expressions, and kidnap them if they seem to be traitorous	George Orwell's Nineteen Eighty-Four	Book
UNATCO	United Nations Anti-Terrorist Coalition	Deus Ex	Video game

=== Star Trek universe ===
Agency	Info
Tal Shiar	Romulan secret police and intelligence agency
Obsidian Order	Cardassian secret police and intelligence agency
Starfleet Intelligence	Federation intelligence agency
Section 31	Rogue and officially nonexistent Federation intelligence organization
V'Shar	The Vulcan Intelligence & Security agency

=== Star Wars universe ===
Agency	Info
Imperial Intelligence	The intelligence arm of the Galactic Empire
Imperial/Sith Intelligence	The intelligence arm of the reborn Sith Empire
Imperial Security Bureau (ISB)	The secret police of the Galactic Empire
Inquisitorius	Dark side-aligned Jedi-hunting operatives of the Galactic Empire
Republic Intelligence	The intelligence service of the Galactic Republic
Clone Intelligence	The branch of the Republic Intelligence during the Clone Wars
Rebel Alliance Intelligence Service	The intelligence service of the Rebel Alliance, led by former Jedi Padawan and "Fulcrum" Ahsoka Tano
New Republic Intelligence (NRI)	The intelligence service of the New Republic
First Order Security Bureau	Enforcement and espionage agency of the First Order
Galactic Alliance Intelligence	The intelligence service of the Galactic Federation of Free Alliances, the successor government to the New Republic
Bothan Spynet	The intelligence service of the Bothans, affiliated with the Rebel Alliance and its successor states the New Republic and the Galactic Alliance
Public Safety Service (PSS)	The successor of the Corellian Security Force, after the Imperial government turns the latter from a regular police force into a secret police.
Galactic Alliance Guard (GAG)	The secret police of the Galactic Federation of Free Alliances during the Second Galactic Civil War (fate after the war unknown).
Rakatan-run Force Hounds	From Star Wars Legends

== Fantasy ==
Agency	Info	Source	Source type
Abteilung KDA	"Die Abteilung KDA (Komplexe und Diffuse Angelegenheiten)", or "Department for Complex and Unspecific Matters". Modern agency responsible for dealing with magic and supernatural entities in Germany	Rivers of London.	Books/Comics
The academy	"La Académie Royale de Philosophie Occulte", or "The Royal Academy of Occult Philosophy/Theory". Agency responsible for dealing with magic and supernatural entities in France. Was closed down by the French Revolution before being reconstituted by Napoleon in 1804. Membership was divided between supporting and opposing the Vichy government during the Second World War. Was "reorganized" out of existence in 1965 after making the wrong choice on the Algerian Referendum. Is rumored to have reopened in 2015.	Rivers of London.	Books/Comics
Algemene Inlichtingen en Veiligheidsdienst (AIVD)	"General Intelligence and Security Service". Agency responsible for dealing with magic and supernatural entities in the Netherlands.	Rivers of London.	Books/Comics
Auror Office	Various branches of various magic law enforcement departments specializing in the arrest of dark wizards.	Harry Potter	Books/Films
Besondere Umstände	"Special Circumstances", also known as the "Fire Brigade" and/or "Reality control". Rapid Response team for the Abteilung KDA. Reduced from roughly six teams across Germany in the 1950s and 1960s to a single team based in Wiesbaden.	Rivers of London.	Books/Comics
Black Chamber		The Atrocity Archives; The Jennifer Morgue	Book
Bureau 13		Bureau 13: Stalking the Night Fantastic	Role playing game
Bureau for Paranormal Research and Defense (B.P.R.D.)		Hellboy; Hellboy (film)	Comics & Film
Cable Street Particulars	Ankh-Morpork secret police (under Captain Swing), and later merely the "plainclothes" division (under Samuel Vimes).	Terry Pratchett's Discworld	Book
Cipher Pol	The main intelligence agency of the World Government, Cipher Pol cells are located throughout the world. They investigate for the World Government and, in contrast to the Marines, handle political threats to the World Government. There are eight official Cipher Pols numbered from CP1 to CP8 as well as two unofficial units, CP9, whose members specialize in assassinations, and CP0, the personal guard of the Celestial Dragons.	One Piece	Comics/Television
Dai Li	Earth Kingdom capital of Ba Sing Se	Avatar: The Last Airbender and The Legend of Korra	Animated TV
Death Eaters	Voldemort's terroristic and power-hungry elite of paramilitary death squads consisting of upper-class dark wizards and witches whose deadly agenda is to wipe out and kill all muggle-born people and establish a new society of pure-blood race.	Harry Potter and its 8-part film saga	Books And Film Adaptations
Delta Green	Intelligence unit dedicated to combating the supernatural and the Cthulhu Mythos. Existed in various incarnations: From 1928 to 1942 was part of the ONI until its transference into the OSS, it is disbanded in 1968 after a failed operation but its agents keep acting illegally until its recreation in 2001, nominally under the NSA as a counter-terror program, but recruiting agents all over the military, USIC and federal law enforcement.	Delta Green	Role playing game
Department of Magical Law Enforcement	It is the department of the British Ministry of Magic that enforces magical law for the citizens of the magical community in Great Britain, it also has different branches such as the Auror Office, specializing in dark wizards.	Harry Potter	Literature/Films
Die Deutsche Akademie der Höheren Einsichten zu Weimar	"Die Weimarer Akademie der Höheren Einsichten", or "The Weimar Academy of Higher Insights". Original agency responsible for dealing with magic and supernatural entities in Germany. Was the center for German magic after the French closed the University of Cologne in 1789, until the Nazis closed it in the 1930s in preference of their own organizations. Its successor is the Abteilung KDA.	Rivers of London.	Books/Comics
F.E.A.R.	First Encounter Assault Recon; Paranormal investigation agency	F.E.A.R.	Videogame
The Folly	"Specialist Crime Directorate 9", later "Special Assessment Unit, SAU". Agency responsible for dealing with magic and supernatural entities in the United Kingdom	Rivers of London.	Books/Comics
Gale Force		Wicked	Musical
General Oblation Board		His Dark Materials	Book
G.R.U. Division Psychotronics (GRU-P)	A division of the Soviet Union's Main Intelligence Directorate dealing in the research and elimination of paranormal phenomenon.	SCP Foundation	Website
The Laundry		The Atrocity Archives; The Jennifer Morgue	Book
LEPRecon	The Lower Elements Police Reconnaissance, known as LEP or Recon, is the agency of the underworld fairies who maintain reconnaissance on the upper world of humans, commonly called "Mud Men" or "Mud People".	Artemis Fowl	Books/Graphic novels
The Librarians	"New York Libraries Association", or "The Association". Wing of the New York Public Library Services that sees itself as the foremost authority on magic in the New York area, and which actively works to contain magical threats therein. It is suggested that as a part of their work they actively seek out magical items and tomes across the world in order to lock them away in their special collections stacks.	Rivers of London.	Books/Comics
The Midnighters	The secret police of Camorr under Duke Nicovante. Headed by an agent with the code name 'The Spider', revealed to be Dona Angiavesta Vorchenza, later passed on to Don and Dona Salvara	The Lies of Locke Lamora	Book
Order of Mata Nui		Bionicle	
Penitus Oculatus	Secret security and special operations branch of the Imperial Guards	The Elder Scrolls	
Owsla	The rabbit army/police and the Owslafa, secret police, especially of Efrafa	Watership Down	
Samoyed Guards		His Dark Materials	Book
SCP Foundation	An international organization responsible for the research and containment of anomalous phenomenona.	SCP Foundation	Website
Secret Police	Headed by the wolf, Maugrim	The Lion, the Witch and the Wardrobe	Book
Shinra		Namco x Capcom	Videogame
Shinra Electric Power Company		Final Fantasy VII	Video game
S.H.U.S.H.		Darkwing Duck	Animated TV
SI:7	Secret service for human faction of Stormwind	World of Warcraft	
Special Operations Network	consisting of numbered divisions each dealing with a different secret threat	Jasper Fforde's Thursday Next novels	Book
The Virginia Gentleman's Company	"The Virgins", or "Alderman Technical Solutions". Private magical military contractor organization based out of Charlottesville, Virginia. While it is not clear if they ever held any official government position, the VGC have a history of working for the US government which goes back to at least the War of 1812 where they fought against the British and Tecumseh. They carry a deep animosity for the Folly due to that organization sharing their Newtonian magical methods with Tecumseh's people which caused the VGC to suffer severe casualties. This animosity was most evident during the Second World War when they withheld information from the Folly which led to the majority of Folly membership dying.	Rivers of London (book series).	Books/Comics
The Virtuous Men	"The Printer's Men". Group of around 100 men from the University of Pennsylvania who fought alongside the Folly during the Second World War. They were said to not get along with many of their fellow American practitioners due to philosophical differences, most notably the Virginia Gentleman's Company (most likely due to their closeness with the Folly).	Rivers of London (book series).	Books/Comics
United Nations Global Occult Coalition (UNGOC)	A clandestine division of the United Nations responsible for locating and eliminating paranormal threats.	SCP Foundation	Website
Unusual Incidents Unit (UIU)	A division of the FBI tasked with monitoring and responding to paranormal threats.	SCP Foundation	Website

== See also ==
- List of secret police organizations
- Emergency service
- Law enforcement agency
- List of fictional espionage organizations
