= Fury: S.H.I.E.L.D. 50th Anniversary =

2015 comic book one-shot

- Cover art by Mike Deodato.

Publication information
- Publisher: Marvel Comics
- Genre: Spy, superhero
- Publication date: 2015
- No. of issues: 1
- Main character(s): Nick Fury Jr; Nick Fury

Creative team
- Created by: Scott Hepburn
- Written by: David F. Walker
- Artist: Lee Ferguson
- Penciller: Lee Ferguson
- Letterer: Clayton Cowles
- Colorist: Jason Keith

Fury: S.H.I.E.L.D. 50th Anniversary is a 32-page comic book one-shot published by Marvel Comics in 2015 as part of a series of one-shots to celebrate the fiftieth anniversary of the creation of the fictional intelligence agency S.H.I.E.L.D. The story deals with racial issues both in 1965 and in 2015.

== Publication history ==
The one-shot was published in 2015 to celebrate the 50th anniversary of the fictional organisation S.H.I.E.L.D., together with Agent Carter: S.H.I.E.L.D. 50th Anniversary, The Cavalry: S.H.I.E.L.D. 50th Anniversary, Mockingbird: S.H.I.E.L.D. 50th Anniversary and Quake: S.H.I.E.L.D. 50th Anniversary.

== Plot ==
The story is told in two parallel parts, one in 1965 with Nick Fury Sr and the other in 2015 with Nick Fury Jr. In both times there are race riots going on and the younger Fury has to travel back in time to his fathers time to follow the racist supervillain the Hate-Monger from killing a young child who will one day become indispensable for the civil rights movement. After teaming up with his father, but without revealing who he is they manage to stop the Hate-Monger and save the boy, who is named Barry.

== Reception ==
Jesse Schedeen of IGN expressed that while the comic works well with exploring the troubled father son issues between the two main characters the attempt at tackling American racial issues feels very perfunctory, most likely due to the limited scope of the issue. He also stated that the use of the rather goofy villain the Hate-Monger and the one the nose ending brought the story down. Steve Hooker of Multiverse-Magazine on the other hand found the ending shocking and stated that the issue was poignant.

James Johnston of Multiversity Comics stated that while the story is probably not the story that's going to put Fury Jr. on the map, it is still a nice one shot that helps flesh out the modern character while at the same time tying the older one into some relevant political discussion.

Jim Johnson of CBR.com expressed that it was a decent, if a bit convenient tale and that he would recommend it but that he found it a somewhat lightweight celebration for such a significant milestone as the 50th anniversary of S.H.I.E.L.D.

== See also ==
- 2015 in comics
