= Cate Archer =

Fictional character from No One Lives Forever series

- No One Lives Forever character
- No One Lives Forever 2 promo image
- First game: The Operative: No One Lives Forever (2000)
- Voiced by: Kit Harris (NOLF); Jen Taylor (NOLF2)
- Motion capture: Mitzi Martin

Catherine Ann "Cate" Archer, codenamed The Fox, is a playable character and the protagonist in the No One Lives Forever video game series by Monolith Productions. Cate, a covert operative for British-based counter-terrorism organization UNITY, is the main character in The Operative: No One Lives Forever (2000) and No One Lives Forever 2: A Spy in H.A.R.M.'s Way (2002), and is also featured in Contract J.A.C.K., an official prequel to the second game.

== Conception and design ==
Archer's appearance in The Operative: No One Lives Forever was visually styled after model and actress Mitzi Martin.

The in-game model of Cate Archer was styled after model and actress Mitzi Martin. This was a marketing decision made by the publisher, Fox Interactive, which used its feature film casting department to look for an appropriate model internationally. Archer's voice was provided by American voice actress Kit Harris, who also did the voice of the Inge Wagner character. Originally, Harris recorded the Scottish protagonist's voice in a stronger Scottish accent. This was changed after a Scottish producer of the game felt that the particular accent used was too lower class, and an inappropriate choice; Harris re-recorded her lines with a "British bent" instead.

In the game's sequel, Archer's face was changed to more closely resemble English model and actress Jean Shrimpton. Voice acting was done by American actress Jen Taylor, who also voiced Isako and the ninjas.

== Appearances ==
Archer is the only playable character in the series' main games, The Operative: No One Lives Forever and No One Lives Forever 2: A Spy In H.A.R.M.'s Way. In the latter, there is a cooperative multiplayer level in which the player is a UNITY agent rescuing Archer while she is unconscious. She also makes a short appearance (as a non-player character) and is a playable multiplayer character in Contract J.A.C.K.

Cate Archer was born in Scotland in late March 1942 to a privileged English-Scottish family. Her mother died soon after she was born and her father committed suicide in 1956. Prior to joining UNITY, Archer pursued a career as a professional thief to provide for herself and because she found it gratifying. She was discovered by agent Bruno Lawrie when Archer stole his watch that had an in-built tracking device. By the time she arrived at her flat, Lawrie was waiting there. Admiring her talent and bravery, he decided to give her a future as an operative for UNITY - an international agency charged with combating terrorism around the globe.

Before the First H.A.R.M Incident, Archer mainly dealt with minor assignments. She was not completely satisfied with her career at UNITY, since she thought that there was no real value in her daily work. Also, she was the first female operative of UNITY, so nobody (except Bruno) believed in her. In September 1967, seven active UNITY field operatives were killed by Dmitrij Volkov, a mysterious assassin, who always left a red lily upon his victim. All traces pointed to a terrorist organization called H.A.R.M. This emergency situation forced the organization to call upon Archer to undertake her first major assignment. She and Bruno Lawrie went to Morocco, thereby beginning the chain of events which unfold in the first game. Their missions were foiled one after another, as if someone knew about their plans, yet she survived all the time. Mr. Smith didn't trust her, which was even furthered by his sexism. However, Mr. Jones gave her last chance. In the end of the first game Archer killed two primary antagonists: Baroness Dumas and Dmitrij Volkov (who would turn to be alive), and also exposed the traitors within UNITY. By the time the incident was resolved, she had gained the respect of her superiors and colleagues, and came to be regarded as one of UNITY's top field agents.

== Reception ==
In 2007, Cate was included by Tom's Games on the list of the 50 greatest female characters in video game history ("As a delightfully retro 1960s British agent, Archer is the female equivalent of James Bond. She's irresistibly sexy, stubbornly headstrong and proficient with all sorts of Bond-like gadgets"). That same year, Cate was ranked sixth in ActionTrip's list of top "video game chicks", and the site's writer stated: "Apart from being one of most attractive game heroines out there, she's the female equivalent of James Bond and not many chicks can stand up to that. She's sexy and there's simply nothing she can't handle." In 2008, Play listed her as one of their favorite female characters in their sixth "Girls of Gaming" issue, stating she's "as badass as Bourne and as suave as Bond," while noting their desire to see her return in another title. That same year, she was ranked as 25th on GameDaily's list of "hottest game babes" list, cited as attractive despite her conservative attire compared to other female characters, and third in UGO.com's list of "girls of gaming", compared to Emma Peel and called a female counterpart to Bond in terms of appeal. She was one of the characters featured in UGO's 2008 list of top 11 spies in all media, stating she "perfectly captures the swinging spy style". In 2009, this "smart, tough heroine" was one of the 64 characters chosen for the GameSpot's poll for the All Time Greatest Game Hero, but lost in the first round against Strider Hiryu. In 2011, GamesRadar named her "Miss 2000" in their article on the sexiest new characters of the decade. Tom's Guide included this "smooth operator" on their 2013 list of the 20 "hottest video game babes" for making "international espionage classy and sexy all at once." In a 2021 article Collider said Archer was "a wonder of a character, with a razor-sharp wit and a wardrobe to match."

== See also ==
- List of female action heroes
