= Backronym =

Acronym invented to fit an existing word

A backronym treats an already existing word as an acronym and expands its letters into the words of a phrase, and so is effectively an acrostic. The word is a portmanteau of back and acronym. Backronyms may be invented with either serious or humorous intent, or they may be a type of false etymology or folk etymology.

A normal acronym is a word derived from the initial letter(s) of the words of a phrase, such as radar from "RAdio Detection And Ranging". By contrast, a backronym is "an acronym deliberately formed from a phrase whose initial letters spell out a particular word or words, either to create a memorable name or as a fanciful explanation of a word's origin". Many fictional espionage organizations are backronyms, such as SPECTRE (SPecial Executive for Counterintelligence, Terrorism, Revenge and Extortion) from the James Bond franchise.

For example, the AMBER alert missing-child program was named after Amber Hagerman, a nine-year-old girl who was abducted and murdered in 1996. Officials later publicized the backronym "America's Missing: Broadcast Emergency Response".

== Examples ==
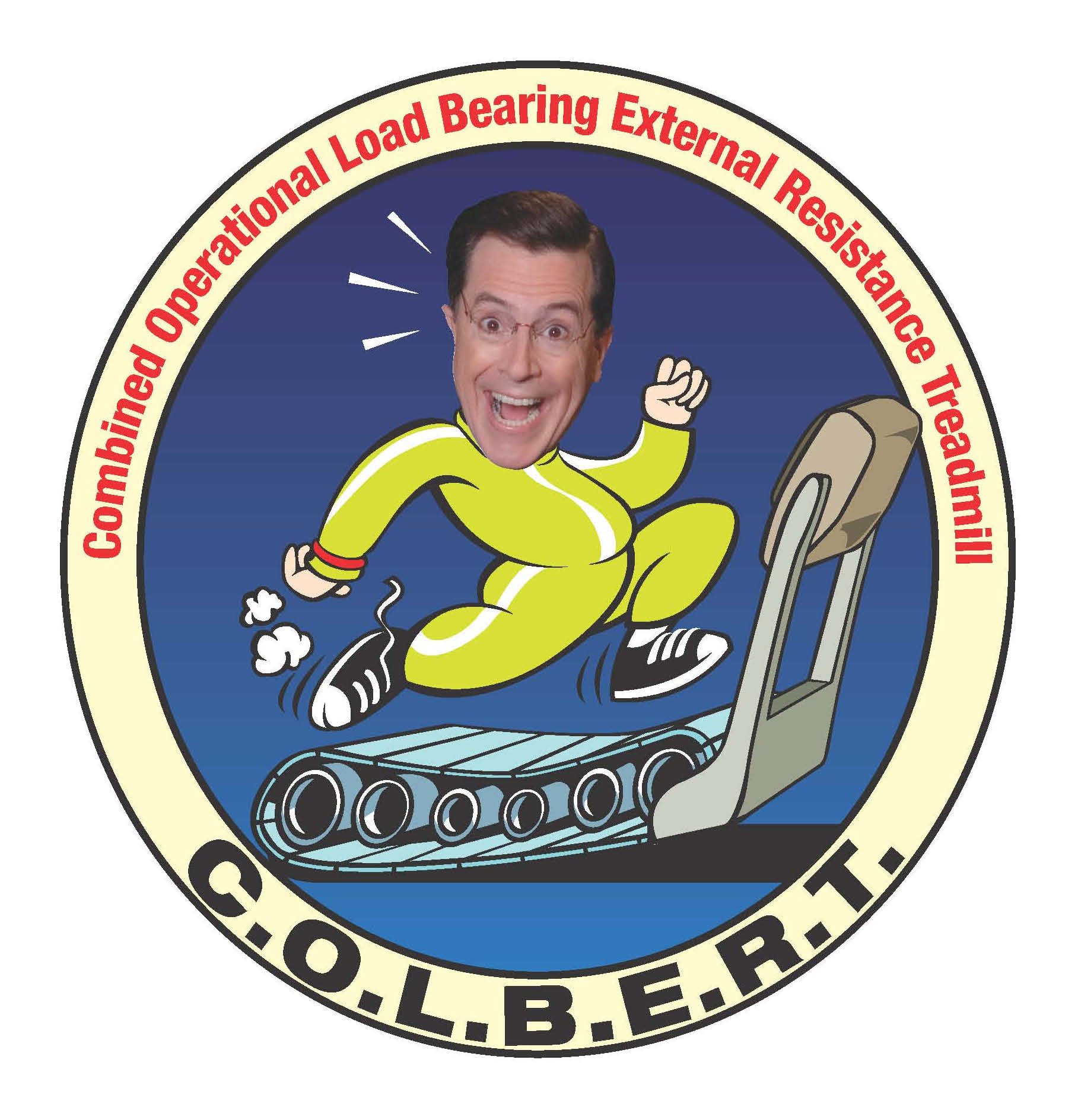
Humorous example of a backronym used by NASA to name a treadmill on the International Space Station, in reference to American comedian Stephen Colbert

An example of a backronym as a mnemonic is the Apgar score, used to assess the health of newborn babies. The rating system was devised by and named after Virginia Apgar. Ten years after the initial publication, the backronym APGAR was coined in the US as a mnemonic learning aid: appearance, pulse, grimace, activity, and respiration. Another example is the American Contract Bridge League's tools to address cheating in online bridge games. EDGAR was originally named after Edgar Kaplan, whose many contributions to the game included groundbreaking efforts to reduce illegal partnership communication. The new EDGAR tools which debuted in early 2024 have been launched with the backronym "everyone deserves a game above reproach".

Many United States Congress bills have backronyms as their names; examples include the USA PATRIOT Act (Uniting and Strengthening America by Providing Appropriate Tools Required to Intercept and Obstruct Terrorism Act) of 2001, the CHIPS and Science Act (Creating Helpful Incentives to Produce Semiconductors), and the DREAM Act (Development, Relief, and Education for Alien Minors Act).

=== As false etymologies ===
Sometimes a backronym is reputed to have been used in the formation of the original word, and amounts to a false etymology or an urban legend. Acronyms were rare in the English language before the 1930s, and most etymologies of common words or phrases that suggest origin from an acronym are false.

Examples include posh, an adjective describing stylish items or members of the upper class. A popular story derives the word as an acronym from "port out, starboard home", referring to 19th-century first-class cabins on ocean liners, which were shaded from the sun on outbound voyages east (e.g. from Britain to India) and homeward voyages west. The word's actual etymology is unknown, but more likely related to Romani påš xåra ('half-penny') or to Urdu (borrowed from Persian) safed-pōśh ('white robes'), a term for wealthy people.

Another example is the word chav, which is a derogatory term for a working-class youth. This word is probably of Romani origin but commonly believed to be a backronym of "council-housed and violent".

Similarly, the distress signal SOS is often believed to be an abbreviation for "save our ship" or "save our souls" but was chosen because it has a simple and unmistakable Morse code representation – three dots, three dashes, and three dots, sent without any pauses between characters.

More recent examples include the brand name Adidas, named after company founder Adolf "Adi" Dassler but falsely believed to be an acronym for "all day I dream about sport".

The word wiki is said to stand for "what I know is", but is in fact derived from the Hawaiian phrase wiki-wiki meaning 'fast'.

The abbreviation "RPG" for the type of weapon originally comes from Russian "РПГ" (ручной противотанковый ггранатомёт, rūchinoy protivotankovyi granatomyot, meaning "handheld anti-tank grenade thrower"), with English decoding "rocket-propelled grenade" appearing later as a backronym.

Yahoo!, sometimes claimed to mean "yet another hierarchical officious oracle", was in fact chosen because Yahoo's founders liked the word's meaning of "rude, unsophisticated, uncouth" (taken from Jonathan Swift's book Gulliver's Travels).

The distress call "pan-pan" is commonly stated to mean "possible assistance needed", whereas it is in fact derived from the French word panne, meaning 'breakdown'.

== See also ==
- Acronymization
- Acrostic
- Pseudo-acronym
- Recursive acronym
- Retronym
- Satiric misspelling
