= The Operative: No One Lives Forever =

2000 video game

- Box art, portraying protagonist Cate Archer
- Developer: Monolith Productions
- Publishers: Windows; Fox Interactive; Mac OS X; MacPlay; PlayStation 2; Sierra Entertainment
- Producers: Chris Miller; Samantha Ryan
- Designer: Craig Hubbard
- Programmer: Kevin Stephens
- Artist: Wes Saulsberry
- Composer: Guy Whitmore
- Engine: Lithtech 2.2
- Platforms: Windows, PlayStation 2, Mac OS X
- Release: November 10, 2000: Windows; NA: November 10, 2000; EU: December 7, 2000; PlayStation 2; NA: April 29, 2002; EU: May 24, 2002; Mac OS X; NA: November 21, 2002
- Genres: First-person shooter, stealth
- Modes: Single-player, multiplayer (Windows, Mac)

The Operative: No One Lives Forever (abbreviated as NOLF) is a first-person shooter video game developed by Monolith Productions and published by Fox Interactive, released for Windows in 2000. The game was ported to the PlayStation 2 and Mac OS X in 2002.

A story-driven game set in the 1960s, No One Lives Forever received critical acclaim for its stylistic representation of the era in the spirit of many spy films and television series of that decade, as well as for its humor. Players control female protagonist Cate Archer, who works for a secret organization that watches over world peace. In addition to a range of firearms, the game contains several gadgets disguised as ordinary female fashion items.

At the time of its release, many reviewers considered No One Lives Forever one of the best first-person shooters since 1998's Half-Life. After receiving several Game of the Year awards in the press, a special Game of the Year Edition was released in 2001, which included an additional mission on a remote island in the South Pacific. The Operative: No One Lives Forever was followed by a sequel, No One Lives Forever 2: A Spy in H.A.R.M.'s Way, in 2002, and a spin-off titled Contract J.A.C.K. released in 2003, both developed by Monolith.

A re-release of the game has been hampered by the complicated state of the series' intellectual property (IP) rights, with even parties assumed to be in possession of the IP having publicly admitted not knowing the precise legal situation of the series.

== Gameplay ==
In No One Lives Forever, protagonist Cate Archer is sent on a variety of missions, including protecting a U.S. ambassador from assassins in Marrakesh, Morocco.

No One Lives Forever is a first-person shooter which includes elements of a stealth game. The player takes on the role of Cate Archer, a fresh agent for the secret organization Unity, sent on various missions. Most, but not all, missions can be solved in multiple ways: using sneaking to avoid danger or by going in with direct gunfire.

A stealthy approach can be taken to evade security cameras, guard dogs and other obstacles. Enemies are aware of noise made by the player, including footsteps and weapon fire, and they also react to footprints in the snow, and dead bodies left lying around. To aid in stealthy approaches, Cate gains access via Unity's "Toy Shop" to a variety of spy gadgetry disguised as female accessories, such as a barrette that can be used for lock picking, sunglasses that include a miniature camera, exploding lipstick, and sleep-inducing perfume.

The game features a wide variety of firearms, ranging from pistols, shotguns, sniper rifles, and a briefcase rocket launcher. Some of the weapons can be loaded with different types of ammunition, including standard full metal jacket bullets, dum dum rounds that expand on impact and cause bleeding damage, and phosphorus-coated tracer bullets that continue to burn upon impact. Silencers and scopes can also be fitted on some weapons.

In various sections of the game, the player can ride a motorcycle, or a snowmobile. Other segments of the game involve boss fights. If the player chooses to be stealthy, they can overhear humorous conversations between non-player characters, such as guards, scientists and civilians.

The missions in the game are littered with "intelligence items": briefcases, envelopes, and manila folders containing textual notes which often provide humorous side-notes and helpful hints to the game. The collection of intelligence items is optional. Special power-ups, called "gear" items, are also available for collection during the game, such as "fuzzy slippers" that reduce noise made by movement, earplugs that reduce damage from explosions, and a fire extinguisher that protects the player from burn damage. These gear items are sometimes located in hard-to-reach areas. At the start of each mission, the player can choose which weapons, gadgets and gear to take with them. Some intelligence and gear items cannot be collected on the first playthrough of the game, as the necessary gadgets to reach them are not unlocked until later in the game. If the player wants to collect these items, they have to revisit the mission with the appropriate equipment. (Note: Level: "Misfortune in Morocco", Scene 2. (Intelligence item). "Cate, you may sometimes come across intelligence items that you cannot recover because you lack a necessary gadget. If you want to collect these items, you'll need to come back later with different equipment. – Bruno")

Gadgets are often disguised as ordinary female fashion items, such as these lipstick explosive devices.

At the end of each mission, the game displays various statistics, as well as any awards and bonuses earned during the mission. Awards are humorous textual notes given for the player's performance during a mission; these include awards for using a very low or a very high number of bullets, or a "Thanks For Not Getting Hurt Award" for avoiding damage. The player also receives a rank, such as "Trainee" or "Super Spy", which is based on the number of intelligence items obtained during the mission. Achieving a high mission rank increases the player's maximum health, armor and ammo capacity, as well as stealth, the amount of inflicted damage, and the accuracy of their shots.

No One Lives Forever also includes multiplayer gameplay online or over a local area network. There are two multiplayer modes available: standard deathmatch, and "H.A.R.M. vs. UNITY", a capture the flag-like mode where each team attempts to sneak into the enemy team's base, finding and photographing a target item, and returning to their own base with the evidence.

== Plot ==
In 1967, the secret international organization Unity, whose purpose is to protect the world from megalomaniacs, discovers over half of their elite agents killed by Dmitrij Volkov, a Russian assassin working for the terrorist organization H.A.R.M. Unity's leaders, Jones and Smith, bring up Cate Archer, a novice and the first female Unity agent, and her mentor Bruno Lawrie to investigate H.A.R.M. Their first mission to Morocco is revealed as a trap set by Volkov, and Bruno is shot while Cate escapes to Unity headquarters. Jones and Smith reveal that Bruno likely was a traitor, helping H.A.R.M. to target their agents, an accusation Cate denies.

Cate is assigned to escort East German biochemist Dr. Otto Schenker to England, but they are ambushed midflight by another H.A.R.M. agent, Magnus Armstrong, who kidnaps Dr. Schenker but allows Cate to live as she is a fellow Scotsman. Back at Unity, Cate is partnered with American Tom Goodman and tasked to recover Dr. Schenker. Their leads take them first to a Hamburg nightclub owned by Igne Wagner, but they narrowly evade another H.A.R.M. attack, revealing Wagner is a H.A.R.M. agent. Cate and Tom then track down a cargo freighter that Unity believe contain chemicals tied to Dr. Schenker's work. They are initially ambushed by Armstrong and other H.A.R.M. agents, resulting in the sinking of the freighter. After escaping, Cate scuba dives to the freighter to obtain the cargo manifest, escaping again from more H.A.R.M. henchmen under Armstrong's and Wagner's orders. The manifest links to a manufacturing firm owned by Baron Archibald Dumas, who claims he has no ties to H.A.R.M. Cate and Tom infiltrate the manufacturing plant. Cate manages to locate the records related to the chemicals being manufactured at the plant before facing off and killing Wagner; while departing, Cate witnesses Tom being shot by Volkov.

Back at Unity headquarters, the recovered documents reveal that Dr. Schenker's work is a biological explosive that can be injected into a target, where it feeds off the body before causing a large explosion. H.A.R.M. begins to use this explosive in public incidents to make demands from the world. Unity has Cate travel to Washington, where she is able to secure Dr. Schenker from H.A.R.M. agents and take him to a secret Unity base. There, Dr. Schenker reveals the antidote for the explosive is stored in H.A.R.M. space station. Cate manages to disguise herself as a member of H.A.R.M. and board the space station, recovering a large sample of the antidote and escaping as the station is destroyed by a meteor shower.

Cate brings the antidote to Unity, and then seeks out the list of infected people. She suspects that Dumas' wife, Baroness Felicity Dumas, is the mastermind given her access to the manufacturing plant, and travels to the Dumas' château in the Swiss Alps. There, she is captured by Armstrong, and the Baroness gloats that Cate has already been infected by Wagner several days earlier. Dismayed by the Baroness' plans, Armstrong decides to defect from H.A.R.M. and helps Cate escape to locate the Baroness' secret lair, where Cate finds more antidote as well as the list of infected people. As she leaves the château via a gondola lift, Volkov appears and the two have a gun duel, which causes an avalanche and sends Volkov over a cliff edge. At the village at the base of the mountain, the Baroness tries to stop Cate, but Cate again wins in a gun fight. The Baroness reveals she also injected herself and only has a short time to live, and Cate rushes through the village to get the civilians to safety before the Baroness explodes.

Jones and Smith congratulate Cate on a job well done. She visits Bruno's grave, but is ambushed by Tom, who reveals he was the true traitor within Unity. Cate subdues Tom and arrests him, but then Smith arrives and shoots Tom before aiming his gun at Cate. Jones arrives, along with Bruno, revealing that Smith was the true traitor within Unity, taking revenge for being pulled off field work by joining H.A.R.M., killing the real Tom years earlier and replacing him with a H.A.R.M. doppelgänger. Smith tries to shoot Cate but she has the upper hand and kills Smith.

In a post-credits scene, it is revealed that Volkov survived the avalanche and reports back to H.A.R.M.'s mysterious Director, a middle-aged drunk man who Cate has seen several times in different countries during the game.

== Production ==
=== Development ===
Work on No One Lives Forever started in 1998, after the release of Monolith Productions' previous game, Shogo: Mobile Armor Division. Craig Hubbard, game designer for Shogo and NOLF expressed that Shogo "(although critically successful) fell embarrassingly short of [the team's] original design goals", and "it is a grim reminder of the perils of wild optimism and unchecked ambition" exercised by the relatively small development team. The team (which included approximately 18 core members during development of NOLF) was determined not to make the same mistakes again with their next game. Describing the pressure on Monolith, Hubbard said that they "were still trying to live down the stigma" of their 1998 game, Blood II: The Chosen, which had been prematurely released buggy and unpolished, and that the company "had a lot to prove, both to ourselves and the gaming public."

Signing a contract with a publisher was a very difficult task for Monolith. Development had been going on for months, and the project had been approved by different publishers four times, before they were able to actually sign a deal with one. During this long time for finding a publishing partner, No One Lives Forever "mutated constantly in order to please prospective producers and marketing departments. The game actually started off as a mission-based, anime-inspired, paramilitary action thriller intended as a spiritual sequel to Shogo and ended up as a 60s spy adventure in the tradition of Our Man Flint and countless other 60s spy movies and shows." This final theme for the game was settled on through discussions with Fox Interactive, the final publisher of NOLF. (Parts of the initial "paramilitary action thriller" concept evolved into F.E.A.R., another Monolith game, released after the NOLF series, in 2005.) Monolith's producer for the game, Samantha Ryan, said that before the deal was signed, "[t]here was a period where Monolith was two weeks from death. And Jace Hall closed the deal with Fox Interactive that basically saved the company."

After finally signing a contract with Fox (with whom partnership was announced to the public on August 24, 1999), the team was able to draft a mission statement, which stood as a point of reference during every aspect of developing the game.

Our primary aim was to make the player feel like the hero of a 60s action/adventure/espionage movie. We came up with a list of the characteristics we felt were necessary to achieve our objective. The game must have a strong narrative, with twists and turns in the spirit of Charade or Where Eagles Dare. It must feature a fiercely competent hero and an assortment of despicable villains. The hero must have access to an impressive arsenal of weapons and gadgets worthy of Our Man Flint, Danger: Diabolik, or Get Smart. There must be memorable, death-defying situations, opportunities for stealth as well as all-out action, and a variety of exotic locales to explore. Finally, every aspect of the presentation must convincingly evoke the era.

— Craig Hubbard, game designer of No One Lives Forever

In an earlier phase of development, the game's protagonist was a male character. This was changed after the press repeatedly made comparisons to James Bond video games.

The game was announced at the 1999 E3 conference show. While at this time – as described in the mission statement above – the game was already set out to be a spy-themed shooter set in the 1960s, the version that was previewed to the press at this time had many differences to the finished product, with regard to characters, plot and setting. The game's protagonist was originally set out to be a male character called Adam Church who worked for MI0, "Her Majesty's Most Secret Service". However, many of the final gameplay and story elements are known to have been present in this earlier iteration of the game: the H.A.R.M. organization; the defection of an East German biophysicist for information about a top-secret Soviet weapons program; the presence of humor in the game; some locations, such as the sunken cargo freighter; the use of gadgets, such as the rocket-launching briefcase; etc.

By at least July 1999, Monolith has decided to introduce many major changes to the game; the main reason being that the gaming press unexpectedly started comparing the game to James Bond games, like GoldenEye 007 (1997). Hubbard mentioned that their intention was to "make a 60s spy game", and claimed that they "didn't want to make a 'Bond' style game, so when people were obviously drawing that comparison, we decided to rework things a bit. We wanted to get away from the Bond comparisons that people were making, so we've changed the main character and the back-story a fair amount." As a result, the player controls a female protagonist in the final game, Cate Archer, who works for an organization called UNITY. Changing the main character to a woman not only helped the separation of the game from the Bond franchise, but also allowed for "more interesting dramatic possibilities", and the "list of gadgets got a lot more visually interesting". As Hubbard said, before switching to a female protagonist, he had been "struggling with trying to distinguish him from all the other male superspies from the era—extraordinarily handsome, intelligent, knowledgeable, resourceful, and so on. But a woman with those same characteristics immediately stood out because of the social climate of the time. No matter how qualified she might be, she'd have to overcome some serious barriers just to get a chance to prove herself. And if things didn't go flawlessly on a mission, she'd catch more heat than she deserved."

The female protagonist "went through numerous concept sketches, costume designs, hairstyles, names, and even nationalities." According to Hubbard, it was a challenge to find a look for her that was not only evocative of era, "but also worked as a 3D model." In the end, the in-game model of Cate Archer was styled after model and actress Mitzi Martin. This was a marketing decision made by the publisher, Fox Interactive, which used its feature film casting department to look for an appropriate model internationally. Archer's voice was provided by American voice actress Kit Harris, who also did the voice of the Inge Wagner character. Originally, Harris recorded the Scottish protagonist's voice in a stronger Scottish accent. This was changed after a Scottish producer of the game felt that the particular accent used was too lower class, and an inappropriate choice; Harris re-recorded her lines with a "British bent" instead. Both the face and the voice of the character were changed in the game's sequel, where she was voiced by Jen Taylor.

Along with the character and plot changes, it was also decided to change the game's working title, No One Lives Forever, to something else, for similar reasons related to the Bond franchise (in particular, the novel Nobody Lives for Ever), as well as possible legal considerations. However, the title instead stayed consistent throughout development.

After the game's release, Hubbard identified the realistic expectations set by the team as a strong point in the game's development, saying that "given our budget, team size, and development cycle, the best we could hope to do was to create a fun, engaging 60s espionage game that would make up in presentation what it lacked in innovation." Other positive aspects of the process included the aforementioned mission statement, along with the flexible systems used in development, the cohesion of the team, and effective scheduling. On the other hand, Hubbard cited difficulties in fleshing out the final team, as well as inefficient pre-production, delays due to waiting on technology, and the major difficulties in finding a publisher. Hubbard also mentioned the cinematic cutscenes as lengthy and problematic, partly because of technical difficulties, and partly because of conceptual flaws on his behalf, with regard to screenwriting. Regarding gameplay, he said that "[o]ne of the main failings of NOLF [...] was that it ended up feeling a lot more scripted and linear than it was intended to be". Hubbard also expressed dissatisfaction with the balance between action and intrigue: "Unfortunately, we came up a little short on intrigue. Stealth was too unforgiving. Once you were spotted, you were playing an action game." The team paid attention to these points while developing No One Lives Forever 2.

According to Hubbard, the team's "greatest asset was [probably] the list of mistakes we made during Shogo. We started this project with a pretty sober view of what we could achieve. As a result, every major feature we outlined made it into the game, as well as a few additional items we came up with during the project." However, there were still things that the team didn't have enough time to implement. For example, No One Lives Forever's team-based multiplayer portion was originally going to be a story-driven cooperative gameplay mode (similar to the "Assault" game type in the 1999 first-person shooter Unreal Tournament), including objectives and obstacles for the two teams. Like the single-player story in the game, this gameplay mode was also going to incorporate humor; for example, in one map, a goal of each team was to find a special watermelon for a mayor in a Moroccan marketplace. While this mode was publicly discussed even in July 2000, it is not present as such in the final product (which went gold on October 20). The different objectives were changed to a general goal for both teams in all maps: photographing the other team's intelligence item. However, a number of remnants stemming from the earlier gameplay design can be seen in some of the released maps, such as the office of the aforementioned mayor seen in the Morocco map. Fully realized co-operative multiplayer was, however, a feature of No One Lives Forever 2.

=== Technology ===
No One Lives Forever utilizes the LithTech game engine, which was originally developed by Monolith, and later by its subsidiary, LithTech, Inc. (later known as Touchdown Entertainment). The game is based on LithTech 2.5 (the first game to use this version), with many custom additions and modifications to support the game's design, such as support for vehicles. According to the game's creators, characters in NOLF were built from more polygons than any other PC action game at the time, with Cate Archer's model having approximately 1,700 polygons.

The artificial intelligence (AI) in NOLF was significantly advanced at the time of the game's release. Enemy AI can react to eleven different stimuli, including hearing the player's footsteps or weapon firing, seeing the player's footprints in the snow, or hearing an ally scream in pain. The AI can try and investigate the source of these stimuli, by following the footprints for example, and can sound alarms or call for backup. During combat, the AI finds cover positions, and, to some extent, can also use its environment for protection, such as flipping over a table and hiding behind it. After advancing AI technology in their subsequent games, Monolith likened the way NOLF's AIs pop randomly in and out of cover to a shooting gallery. Groups of AI guards make use of a group logic when investigating and combating the player. For example, one guard might start firing at the player, while another runs and calls for backup. The game's AI includes friendly and enemy humans, as well as dogs, sharks, and helicopters.

== Design ==
=== Influences and humor ===
"...the game is essentially an attempt to make players feel like the hero of a '60s spy movie. The situations, villains, weapons, gadgets, story, dialogue, and scope are inspired by sources as diverse as Our Man Flint, various Bond films, Where Eagles Dare, Charade, The Avengers, Man from U.N.C.L.E., Mission: Impossible, Get Smart, Danger: Diabolik, Modesty Blaise, and countless other shows, films, and novels from the era, as well as numerous historical references. That said, we've certainly attempted to give NOLF a personality of its own by tweaking the cliches rather than merely rehashing them."

— Craig Hubbard, game designer of No One Lives Forever

In terms of video games, Monolith drew inspiration from a number of stealth/action games, such as Metal Gear Solid (1998), Tenchu: Stealth Assassins (1998), Syphon Filter (1999), and GoldenEye 007 (1997), because the team was "interested in a blend of stealth and action rather than focusing on one or the other exclusively." The original release of the 1981 stealth game Castle Wolfenstein was also cited as being influential.

Thematically, influences behind The Operative: No One Lives Forever were primarily 1960s spy-themed films, novels, television shows, as well as historical references. When it was decided that NOLF was going to be a 1960s spy game, lead designer Craig Hubbard started immersing himself in the subject matter, in order to "develop some fluency" in it. As he explained, he "was a big fan of early Bond films, but didn't know a lot about the whole spy craze. So I watched the Derek Flint movies [Our Man Flint, In Like Flint], Modesty Blaise, Matt Helm, Danger: Diabolik, Avengers – anything I could get my hands on." Other influences included books, such as The Spy Who Came in from the Cold, TV shows like The Saint, The Pink Panther films, commando movies, such as The Guns of Navarone, as well as "lots of historical references, encompassing everything from books and documentaries on the spy trade to fashion catalogs and interior-design books." The basis for the biological explosives plot was the 1967 film Casino Royale. According to Hubbard, "the idea was to create a game that would make you feel like a superspy, so we tried to come up with situations, characters, and settings to support that goal." During the course of the game, the player can hear explicit popular culture references, including the TV series The Prisoner and The Fugitive, the Matt Helm films The Silencers and The Ambushers, (Note: Level: "Safecracker", Scene 5. (Overheard conversation). "Guard 1: Did you catch the final episode of The Fugitive last month? / Guard 2: I sure did! That's the way to wrap up a series. / [...] / Guard 2: [...] I'm looking forward to The Prisoner. I guess that's starting next Friday. / Guard 1: I haven't heard too much about that one. / Guard 2: It sounds kind of strange. More of a science fiction thing, but I'm willing to give it a shot. / [...] / Guard 1: You like Our Man Flint? / Guard 2: That was a funny movie. I wish In Like Flint was a little better, though. / Guard 1: Well, it's better than The Silencers. Matt Helm doesn't do much for me. / Guard 2: Yeah, there's a new one coming out around Christmas. The Ambushers. / Guard 1: I'll probably see it, but I'm not expecting much.") and exotica musicians Les Baxter and Sondi Sodsai. (Note: Level: "A Tenuous Lead", Scene 3. (Overheard conversation). "Guard 1: You play drums, right? / Guard 2: Yeah? / Guard 1: What kind of music do you like? / Guard 2: Exotica, mostly. Les Baxter, Sondi Sodasi, people like that.") Other conversations allude to major events of the time, such as the studio years of The Beatles, (Note: Level: "A Man of Influence", Scene 1. (Overheard conversation). "Guard 1: You like The Beatles? / Guard 2: Sure. / Guard 1: I wish they'd go on tour again. / Guard 2: Don't hold your breath. / Guard 1: Well, as long as they keep making records, I'm happy. I just hope they don't break up.") and the commercial failure of the Edsel automobile. (Note: Level: "Rescue Attempt", Scene 3. (Overheard conversation). "Guard 1: [...] I talked her into giving me the money instead. / Guard 2: What'd you do with it? / Guard 1: First thing I did was buy a '59 Edsel. / Guard 2: Ooo, bad call. / Guard 1: What are you talking about? It's a great car. That thing purrs like a kitten at 90 miles per hour. Hell, I can get her up to 120 without breaking a sweat. / Guard 2: Really? But I thought Edsels bombed. / Guard 1: They didn't meet sales expectations, but Ford still sold over 100,000 of them. / Guard 2: You're kidding! / Guard 1: No, I mean it. A car doesn't have to sell a million units to be successful. It's all about projections. Unfortunately, the Edsel didn't sell as well as Ford expected, but it definitely sold. If you ask me, it was just bad timing. There was a recession and people were looking for more economical cars. / Guard 2: Wow, I never realized. / Guard 1: Just goes to show you how the press can twist things around.")

Humor plays an important role in No One Lives Forever. As Hubbard explained, the game's intention is "to make you laugh, but not at the expense of providing a broader, more satisfying emotional experience than a spoof generally allows, so that even if you don't chuckle once, you can still have plenty of fun playing the game. At heart, NOLF is an action/adventure/espionage game with a healthy dose of levity." Humor is presented mainly via visual gags, overheard conversations, textual intelligence items, and cutscenes. The humor includes "situational humor, and even a dash of absurdity and bathroom humor for good measure. Some of it is subtle, some of it isn't." The name of UNITY, H.A.R.M., and other fictional organizations mentioned in the game follow the spy genre formula of using contrived acronyms for organizations (see List of fictional espionage organizations). What H.A.R.M. actually stands for is never revealed, and speculation about its true meaning is used as a running gag in the game's sequel.

Regarding comparisons between the game and the Austin Powers film series, Hubbard pointed out on several occasions that, unlike Austin Powers, No One Lives Forever is not a parody of the spy genre. Contrasting the source of the humor in the two series, Hubbard noted that while the game is "campy and silly, [...] the underlying premise borders on apocalyptic. That dichotomy in tone results in a very different style of humor from a parody, where everything is in good fun and nobody, including the characters, takes anything very seriously."

=== Music ===
No One Lives Forever music sample
The score of No One Lives Forever dynamically changes during gameplay. In this sample from the "Ambush" theme, the music transitions from the "super ambient" music state into the "suspense/sneak" state.

"The Operative"
Bundled with No One Lives Forever is an album of bonus 1960s-inspired music, titled In the Lounge. This track, called "The Operative", is the only original song on the album with lyrics. Written by Rebecca Kneubuhl, with a vocal performance from Lisa Kable. (Note: Closing credits. Level: "Such is the Nature of Revenge", Scene 2.)

The soundtrack for the original version of No One Lives Forever (as well as the later Mac OS X port) was chiefly composed and produced by Guy Whitmore. The game uses DirectMusic technology, and its music is an example of an adaptive score: the music smoothly and flexibly adapts to the situations that players finds themselves in, in order to simulate film soundtracks. For instance, the music increases in tempo or urgency when the player is in a combat situation, or if enemies become aware of the player's presence. Whitmore's task as composer was "to capture the flavor of the '50s/'60s spy genre, without infringing on any existing copyrights." In order to avoid any legal troubles over music from the James Bond franchise of films and games, Whitmore was initially asked to refrain from using brass instruments; a directive he compared to "being asked to produce a blues album without guitars". While some of the instrument sounds came from professional collections, others were home-made samples, including solo cello sounds performed by Lori Goldston, used in the H.A.R.M. theme. Influences for the score included German composer Peter Thomas, the soundtrack of the 1968 film Barbarella, and "an array of Italian composers who did beautiful scores for low budget European erotic films."

Whitmore's adaptive score was not used for the PlayStation 2 version of the game. Instead, it featured original music by Rebecca Kneubuhl, and mixed by Gabriel Mann. The No One Lives Forever theme song was created by Rich Ragsdale. Kneubuhl and Mann also provided vocals for the title theme.

==== In the Lounge ====
The game was released with bonus 1960s-inspired music on the second CD. The songs available on this album, titled In the Lounge, were not featured in the game, but were specifically written as extra material. The 9 songs were written by Rebecca Kneubuhl (who created the in-game score for the later PlayStation 2 port as well), and were recorded at Asylum Studios. The CD also features two songs by independent artists: "Void" by Red Delicious and "El Dorado" by Archie Thompson. These were selected for inclusion as part of a NOLF online "music search", organized by Fox Interactive and Indiespace.com.

== Releases and ports ==
=== Original release and Game of the Year Edition ===
The Operative: No One Lives Forever was originally released for Windows in the United States on November 10, 2000, by Fox Interactive, after it went gold on October 20. Before the game's release, a tech demo was released that included four single player missions, with one being a training mission. After the game's release, another demo was released, dubbed "Mega Mix Demo", which contained four single player levels and two multiplayer maps. A number of patches and map packs had also been made freely available for the game.

After receiving a number of Game of the Year awards, a special Game of the Year Edition was released on October 4, 2001. At this point, Fox Interactive co-published titles with a selection of partners, with the "Game of the Year" edition of the title being co-published by Sierra On-Line. This re-released version includes an exclusive mission otherwise not available in the original game, titled "Rest and Relaxation", which is available after the original story. The GOTY edition comes with the game's official Prima strategy guide, and it also contains more multiplayer maps, which were also made available as a download for owners of the original game.

In 2001, Monolith Productions released a set of editing tools for No One Lives Forever that included the level editor and model editor used for development. The team also released the source code for NOLF (version 1.003 on Windows) that year to "support the fan base by offering the tools to create their own levels". It is available both as a download, as well as on the Game of the Year Edition CD-ROM.

=== PlayStation 2 port ===
On May 11, 2000, at E3, Fox Interactive announced that No One Lives Forever would be released for the PlayStation 2, although no release date was planned within that time.

On May 2, 2001, Vivendi Universal Interactive Publishing and Fox Interactive signed a co-publishing agreement for four titles, including the PS2 port of No One Lives Forever, all of which would be released under the company's Sierra division. This deal followed an initial January 2001 announcement by Fox where they announced to cease publishing as a standalone unit. The port was initially announced for a Q4 2001 release, but was instead released on April 29, 2002.

The PlayStation 2 version is a port of the original version released in 2000, and not the "Game of the Year Edition" released in 2001, thus, the "Rest and Relaxation" extra mission is unavailable, but it includes three exclusive flashback levels not available in other releases of the game titled "Nine Years Ago", in which the player controls a younger Cate Archer, when she used to be a cat burglar. Each of the new levels is accessed during several moments in the original story, when Cate is knocked out by Armstrong. All three levels use new textures, new character models, and feature Cate's cat burglar outfit, as well as two exclusive gadgets. The port does not feature Guy Whitmore's original interactive score; instead, it uses different original music by Rebecca Kneubuhl. Multiplayer mode is not present in this version of the game.

=== Mac OS X port ===
A port of No One Lives Forever – Game of the Year Edition for the Mac OS X operating system was developed by MumboJumbo, and published by MacPlay. It was released on November 21, 2002, soon after the original Windows release of No One Lives Forever 2: A Spy in H.A.R.M.'s Way (which was also ported to Mac OS X by MacPlay later). Similarly to the Windows version of the game, the Mac OS X port also uses GameSpy technology for its online multiplayer mode, allowing players to play with each other, no matter which platform they use.

=== Possible re-release ===
With the rise of digital distribution of video games in the latter part of the 2000s, there has been speculation about a possible re-release, or even a remake of the titles in the No One Lives Forever series. However, a number of reports have pointed out the complicated state of the series' intellectual property (IP) rights. Even parties that have strong ties to the IP, including video game publisher Activision and NOLF designer Craig Hubbard, have publicly admitted not knowing the precise legal situation of the series, as of May 2014.

In April 2013, Activision community manager Dan Amrich attempted to explain the acquisition history of the No One Lives Forever IP in a public video. This history includes the 2003 acquisition of NOLF publisher Fox Interactive by Vivendi Universal Games (who also owned Sierra Entertainment), as well as the 2008 merger between Vivendi Universal Games (VUG, which had since been renamed Vivendi Games) and video game publisher Activision, forming the Activision Blizzard holding company. After the merger, Activision decided to sell off some IPs and retain others. In order to find out the legal details behind NOLF, Amrich asked his colleagues, saying that "[t]he person that I normally talk to about this stuff does not believe that we [at Activision] currently have the rights. They've never seen it, they've never been given the permission to put that stuff on [GOG.com]. He said, basically, 'If we had it, I would love to be able to reissue those old games.'" Amrich also asked a friend of his who worked at NOLF developer Monolith (since acquired by Warner Bros. Interactive Entertainment), who also did not know who the IP belonged to. Amrich concluded that "at this time I do not believe that Activision has the rights to No One Lives Forever."

When asked about the rights to the game in July 2013, NOLF designer Craig Hubbard also expressed confusion about the legal complexities behind the series. According to Hubbard, "my understanding was that Monolith owned the IP and Fox owned the title of the first game, which was technically The Operative: No One Lives Forever. I think Monolith actually owned A Spy in H.A.R.M.'s Way, the subtitle of the sequel, but I could be wrong about that. Fox got acquired by VUG, which in turn got acquired by Activision, while Monolith got bought by Warner Brothers, so some stars would have to align for everything to get sorted out." Hubbard added that "there didn't seem to be any interest in resurrecting the franchise" as of 2012, while he was still working at Monolith/Warner Bros.

A possible venue for re-release of the games would be computer game sale and distribution service GOG.com. In an interview with GOG.com's Trevor Longino, he said that "NOLF is a really great title, and it's one of the ones where the rights are a bear to get sorted. Just like pretty much any other classic IP you're ever thought of, we've looked into it, but it's not an easy thing to do."

In May 2014, Nightdive Studios, a publisher of classic PC titles, filed trademarks for "No One Lives Forever", "The Operative", "A Spy in H.A.R.M.'s Way", and "Contract J.A.C.K.", Nightdive had also been able to acquire the source code for the games, which would enable them to remaster them for modern computer systems. However, Nightdive had yet to comment on the situation regarding who owned the rights to the game. As of 2014, the rights to the series were unclear, as the property may have been owned solely or in part by 20th Century Fox (which owned Fox Interactive at the time of the game's release), Activision (which acquired and merged with Vivendi Games, which in turn was the parent to Sierra Entertainment, the publisher of No One Lives Forever 2, and had acquired Fox Interactive in 2003), and Warner Bros. Interactive Entertainment (which acquired Monolith Productions). Warner Bros. did file opposition to Nightdive's trademark, leading Nightdive to try to seek a license arrangement. However, Warner Bros. representatives were concerned that if either Fox or Activision had a part of the ownership, that they would also need their approval. Nightdive attempted to work with Fox and Activision to search their archives, but as these transitions pre-dated computerized records, neither company wanted to do so. Nightdive's efforts were further stalled when they were told by Warner Bros. that they had no interest in partnering or licensing the IP, leading Nightdive to abandon their efforts to acquire the rights. Nightdive remained optimistic about a remaster following the closure of Monolith in March 2025, as changes in the industry have helped to shift the prospect of getting the rights, according to Nightdive.

Since 2014, the rights situation has been complicated due to acquisitions and changes in the entertainment industry. As of 2026, 20th Century Fox (now 20th Century Studios) is owned by the Walt Disney Company, Activision by Microsoft Gaming, and Warner Bros. is expected to be merged with Paramount Skydance that year.

== Reception and legacy ==
Reception

Aggregate scores
Aggregator	Score
GameRankings	(PC) 88.34% (PS2) 70.12%
Metacritic	(PC) 91/100 (PS2) 67/100

Review scores
Publication	Score
Computer Gaming World	(PC) 4.5/5
Eurogamer	(PC) 8/10
GameSpot	(PC) 9.3/10 (PS2) 4.6/10
IGN	(PC) 9.1/10 (PS2) 6.9/10 (Mac) 9.1/10
Next Generation	(PC) 4/5
Computer Games Magazine	(PC) 5/5

Awards
Publication	Award
Game Developers Choice Awards	Game Spotlight Award for innovation (2001)
Computer Games Magazine	Game of the Year; Action Game of the Year
Computer Gaming World	Action Game of the Year
PC Gamer	Action Game of the Year

No One Lives Forever received critical acclaim upon its release, and has an 88.34% ranking on the aggregate site GameRankings (based on 28 reviews), and a score of 91 out of 100 on Metacritic (32 reviews). Many reviewers said at the time that No One Lives Forever was among the best first-person shooters since the influential and critically acclaimed 1998 title Half-Life.

In his review, GameSpot's Erik Wolpaw gave No One Lives Forever a score of 9.3 out of 10, and praised the "game's unrelenting inventiveness [which] shows in virtually every aspect of its design." In IGN's review the game was given a 9.1 overall rating ("Outstanding") out of 10, and was called "one of the best shooters of the year". Eurogamer gave the game a score of 8 out of 10, and called it "thoroughly commendable." Computer Games Magazine gave the game 5 stars out of 5, and claimed that "No One Lives Forever combines a fantastic sense of style with great animation and voice acting, clever AI, industry-leading interactive music, a wry sense of humor, and gameplay that keeps you coming back for more."

Jeff Lundrigan reviewed the PC version of the game for Next Generation, rating it four stars out of five, and stated that "It may not be in quite the same league as Deus Ex, but then, what is? NOLF is one ferociously terrific game. Sequel please."

Critical reception of the PlayStation 2 port of No One Lives Forever was much less positive than the original version. It has a 70.12% ranking on GameRankings (42 reviews), and a score of 67 out of 100 on Metacritic (23 reviews). IGN gave the PlayStation 2 version an overall rating of 6.9 ("Passable") out of 10. The PlayStation 2 port received a 4.6 score ("Poor") out of 10 from GameSpot, and was panned mainly for the lack of the quicksave feature available in the PC version. The Mac OS X version of the game was given a 9.1 rating overall ("Outstanding") by IGN, and was called "a fabulous Mac version of this top notch game."

In the United States, No One Lives Forever sold 36,501 copies by the end of 2000, which accounted for $1.32 million in revenue. The editors of PC Gamer US called these figures "a tragedy, and it's tough to nail a reason." By January 2002, the game's total sales had reached 350,000 copies.

=== Awards ===
No One Lives Forever has earned several Game of the Year awards in the video game press. NOLF was named "Game of the Year" and "Action Game of the Year" by Computer Games Magazine. It also received "Action Game of the Year" awards from Computer Gaming World and PC Gamer magazines. During the 4th Annual Interactive Achievement Awards, the Academy of Interactive Arts & Sciences nominated the game in the categories for "Game Play Engineering", "PC Action/Adventure", "PC Game of the Year", and "Game of the Year". NOLF was also nominated for the International Game Developers Association's 2001 Game Developers Choice Awards in four categories: Game of the Year, Original Character of the Year, Excellence in Level Design, and Game Spotlight Awards. Out of these, the game earned a Game Spotlight Award for innovation.

=== Legacy ===
Retrospective articles written about the game have also been positive. In a 2003 GameSpy feature called "The Top 25 Underrated Games of All Time", No One Lives Forever was ranked as #19, dubbing it and its sequel "two of the most memorable games of the past 10 years." In an article written in 2009 (nine years after the game's release), Eurogamer states that the game has "dated enormously but survives well", and that "you simply couldn't make No One Lives Forever today. You couldn't because it would be too long, require far too many assets, and most significantly of all, risk all the cost of development on a comedy game – a genre that no longer exists." In a 2010 online PC Gamer feature titled "Why you must replay No One Lives Forever", Tim Stone hailed the 10-year-old game's use of humor, and wrote that NOLF "is every bit the amusing, inventive, life-affirming experience I remembered."

=== Fan-made re-release ===
In 2017, both the original game and the sequel were released with fan-made patches as free downloads at the No One Lives Forever Revival Project.

== Sequel and spin-off ==
The Operative: No One Lives Forever is the first game in the No One Lives Forever series. It was followed by a sequel in 2002, entitled No One Lives Forever 2: A Spy in H.A.R.M.'s Way. In 2003, a spin-off of the first two games was released, entitled Contract J.A.C.K.. Being a prequel to No One Lives Forever 2, it is chronologically set between the first two No One Lives Forever games. This stand-alone expansion pack is a shorter game, and unlike the previous titles, its main protagonist is not Cate Archer, but John Jack, who works for H.A.R.M. The game also focuses more on action gameplay, rather than on stealth.
