= Mitzi Martin =

American actress

- Occupations: Actress, model

Mitzi Martin is an American actress and model, most notable for her roles in the films Harley Davidson and the Marlboro Man, Joe Dirt, Dude, Where's My Car?, and The Island. Her likeness and image were also used for the character Cate Archer in the computer game No One Lives Forever.

== Career ==
=== Modeling ===
Martin first came to prominence as a fashion model. Early in her career, she was signed to top agencies such as Marilyn Models in Paris, the now defunct Bethann Models in New York, and Elite Models Los Angeles. Martin has appeared in advertisements for Finesse Shampoo, L'oreal, Laise Adzer, Cutex, 000.1 studio by Ferre, and LA Eyeworks. She has also appeared on numerous magazine covers including Elle Spain, Vogue Germany, Elle Netherlands, Flare Magazine, Model, Moda Magazine, Estetica, and Harper's Bazaar. She is currently represented by Heffner Model Management in Seattle.

=== Acting ===
After a successful career as a fashion model, Martin embarked on an acting career. She appeared in the music video of Sting's single, "Be Still My Beating Heart" in 1988. In 1991, she made her first appearance in the feature film Harley Davidson and the Marlboro Man.

In 1999, she appeared in two avant-garde in house commercials for the Mexican TV station Canal 5 entitled "High Five Girls" and "Cruellas". Both spots, which also featured actress Yadira Pascault Orozco, were directed by Oscar winner Alejandro González Iñárritu.

In 2000, Martin focused her attention to acting, appearing in films such as Dude, Where's my Car?, Joe Dirt, S1m0ne and The Island.
