= No One Lives Forever 2: A Spy in H.A.R.M.'s Way =

2002 first-person shooter video game

- Developer: Monolith Productions
- Publishers: Windows; Vivendi Universal Games (Note: Released under the Sierra Entertainment brand.); Fox Interactive; Mac OS X MacPlay
- Producers: Chris Miller; Samantha Ryan
- Designer: Craig Hubbard
- Programmers: Kevin Stephens; Brad Pendleton
- Artists: David Longo; Wes Saulsberry
- Composer: Nathan Grigg
- Engine: LithTech Jupiter
- Platforms: Windows, Mac OS X
- Release: NA: October 1, 2002; AU: October 10, 2002; EU: October 18, 2002; NA: October 8, 2003 (OS X)
- Genres: First-person shooter, stealth
- Modes: Single-player, multiplayer

No One Lives Forever 2: A Spy in H.A.R.M.'s Way (abbreviated as NOLF 2) is a first-person shooter video game developed by Monolith Productions and published by Fox Interactive and Vivendi Universal Games under Sierra Entertainment for Windows. It was later released to Mac OS X in 2003 by MacPlay. It is the sequel to the 2000 game The Operative: No One Lives Forever. Unlike its predecessor, it was not released for the PlayStation 2.

The story follows spy Cate Archer as she once again takes up arms against the international criminal organization H.A.R.M. Throughout the game, Cate Archer is sent to exotic locales, such as a ninja village, a secret submarine base, and a trailer park in Ohio during a tornado. A whole new range of uniquely designed gadgets and weapons are also introduced, including a blowtorch disguised as a can of hair spray and a robotic bomb disguised as a kitten. The game was followed by a spin-off of the series, entitled Contract J.A.C.K., which was released in 2003.

== Gameplay ==
Shuriken is one of the new weapons.

As in the first game, missions can be completed through action, stealth, or a combination of these methods. In many cases, the missions are more open ended. While the original game contained several missions that required the player not to be detected or avoid setting off alarms, the sequel contained only a few objectives that required complete stealth. However, to counter this, No One Lives Forever 2: A Spy in H.A.R.M.'s Way utilizes respawning enemies more often than the original to encourage the player to complete the missions in a surreptitious manner. The game's AI is designed with a Goal-Oriented Action Planning architecture where the enemies themselves have more control over the actions they perform.

== Plot ==
The game focuses on tensions rising between United States and Soviet Union over the tiny, but strategic Isle of Khios in the Sea of Marmara. A year after the events of the first game, Jones, now the sole Commander of U.N.I.T.Y., is taking a vacation and leaves Bruno Lawrie, the Temporary Director of U.N.I.T.Y., in charge.

U.N.I.T.Y. agent Cate Archer is sent to Japan to investigate a rumored international crime convention expected to take place in the pastoral village of Inotakimura. There, she locates another U.N.I.T.Y. agent Isamu Hatori, who tells Cate to photograph the meeting's participants, including the Director, H.A.R.M.'s leader, without arousing their suspicion. After Cate photographs the meeting's participants she is stabbed by a ninja named Isako, who leaves her for dead.

After the opening credits, Cate is hospitalized by U.N.I.T.Y. and is restored back to health by their staff scientist, Dr. Otto Schenker. After Cate's recovery, the U.S. military advisers, Issac Barnes and General Morgan Hawkins, inform Cate and Bruno of H.A.R.M.'s and the Soviets' plan regarding Project: Omega to prepare their invasion for Khios. Meanwhile, H.A.R.M. agent Dmitrij Volkov is now immobilized in a full-body cast and using a wheelchair due to a skiing accident.

Cate travels to Siberia where she uncovers information about Project: Omega and sabotages the radio tower and power plant. After collecting information regarding the project she is ambushed by H.A.R.M. and the Soviets, but escapes by destroying a bridge. After her mission in Siberia, Cate and Bruno learn that the Soviets and H.A.R.M. are working together to turn the island into the world's first Communist vacation spot with a five-star hotel. Cate travels to Akron, Ohio, and investigates the house belonging to Melvin Blitzny, a vacuum cleaner salesman who serves as a double agent between H.A.R.M. and U.N.I.T.Y. to impersonate former U.N.I.T.Y agent Tom Goodman. After she recovers information about Project: Omega, she is ambushed by Isako's ninjas as she escapes the Blitzny residence. A tornado hits the area and Cate takes down Isako's ninjas before following Isako to a trailer home as it is lifted by a tornado. Cate and Isako engage in a sword fight until the trailer's ceiling rips off, sending Isako into the tornado.

After being recovered from the tornado incident, Cate and her ally, Magnus Armstrong, head to India where they meet Armstrong's old friend, Kamal, a former member of H.A.R.M.'s Indian branch. With Kamal's help, Cate is hired by H.A.R.M., and gains access to their vault, where she collects more documents about Project: Omega. Soon after, Cate and Armstrong are captured by one of H.A.R.M.'s most deadly operatives, Pierre, the self-proclaimed Mime King. Cate and Armstrong escape by welding one of the cage's bolts, and fight their way out of India. During their escape, Armstrong tries to grab Pierre but only succeeds in removing his heavy black cloak and mask, revealing his true form as a mime midget riding a unicycle. Cate and Armstrong try to chase him riding a tricycle, but fail to apprehend him.

Later, Cate and Armstrong head to Antarctica to explore a base there and uncover H.A.R.M.'s intentions with Project: Omega. There, Cate learns that the project consists of turning soldiers into Super-Soldiers, indestructible cyborg-like fighting machines. Cate encounters the first test subject, a Super-Soldier named Lt. Anders, an ex-military officer who believes Cate is his daughter, Abigail. Lt. Anders chases Cate and destroys large parts of the base, but Cate manages to escape after Armstrong heroically grabbed the Lt., allowing her to escape before H.A.R.M. arrives.

The Director learns of Cate's efforts in India, and sends a team of Super-Soldiers to destroy H.A.R.M.'s Indian headquarters as punishment. This provides H.A.R.M with an ideal field test for the Super-Soldiers before they are sent to Khios on their primary mission. Cate immediately returns to Calcutta, India, but finds that the Super-Soldiers have already arrived. The only thing Cate can do is try to get everyone to safety.

Cate then returns to U.N.I.T.Y. and gives Doctor Schenker the technical specifications from the Antarctic facility so that Schenker can devise how to stop the Super-Soldiers. Schenker loses his glasses, and after Cate finds them in a café, the U.N.I.T.Y. headquarters is attacked by Pierre's mimes. Cate takes down the mimes and then rescues Armstrong, who is reportedly captured and located at a H.A.R.M undersea base in the Aegean Sea, unaware that Pierre placed a telephone bug in Schenker's office. Cate arrives at the undersea headquarters and makes her way to the lower level to rescue Armstrong who is trapped in a Super-Soldier pod. Cate takes down Pierre and his mimes, but after she frees Armstrong, Lt. Anders, who is also freed from the pod, destroys parts of the undersea base, causing it to implode. Cate and Armstrong escape the base, but as they reach the Director's private deck they discover that the escape pod is jammed. Armstrong himself releases the pod as he travels to surface in the drowning undersea base. The escape pod is then captured by a H.A.R.M. submarine on its way back up to the surface.

Cate is now held in H.A.R.M.'s secret artificial volcano lair, and escapes after she recovers additional plans for Project: Omega and sabotages the lair. Cate re-encounters and defeats Volkov, who falls into a lava pit. Cate reaches the surface, and discovers that H.A.R.M.'s lair is built directly beneath the Japanese village of Inotakimura. There, Cate battles Isako and her ninjas, and defeats her. The Director arrives and attempts to kill Isako but Cate saves Isako by throwing a ninja star at the Director, disarming him.

Cate is then sent to Khios, where she embarks on her final mission to stop Project: Omega. Unfortunately for her, the island is being overrun by H.A.R.M. and Soviet troops with Super Soldiers. The U.S launches a nuclear missile to destroy the Soviet-held Khios, prompting a Third World War. Cate uses the specially devised Anti Super-Soldier Serum (ASSS) to defeat the Super Soldiers, drowns the H.A.R.M. submarine and successfully repels the invasion. Project: Omega is put to a stop once and for all when Lt. Anders, who escaped the submarine, destroyed the missile before it crashed in the island as he plummets to the ocean below. In a short cutscene after the game credits, the Director's mother rebukes his actions and Volkov tells the Director he quits. The game ends with the Director swearing revenge for Cate and U.N.I.T.Y.

== Development ==
According to Craig Hubbard, Monolith's creative director at the time of the game's release, the game was developed over an 18 month period and was completed on time and on budget. However, one mission was cut from the final release and several others were simplified.

The source code for the game engine was released by Monolith Productions and Sierra Entertainment as part of the No One Lives Forever 2 Toolkit to allow the player to create levels, models, music, sounds, and more. and is currently available for download. Microsoft Visual C++ 6.0 is needed for compilation.

== Reception ==
Reception

Aggregate score
Aggregator	Score
Metacritic	91/100

Review scores
Publication	Score
AllGame	4/5
Computer Gaming World	4.5/5
Eurogamer	8/10
Game Informer	9/10
GamePro	4.5/5
GameRevolution	B+
GameSpot	9.3/10
GameSpy	4.5/5
GameZone	9.5/10
IGN	9/10
PC Gamer (US)	90%
Entertainment Weekly	A

The game received "universal acclaim" according to the review aggregation website Metacritic. GameSpot named it the second-best computer game of September 2002, behind Battlefield 1942.

The game won several awards, including Game of the Year from GameSpy. The game also received a nomination for Excellence in Writing Game Developers Choice Awards, but lost to Tom Clancy's Splinter Cell. The staff of Computer Games Magazine named it the best computer game of 2002, tied with Battlefield 1942. They wrote that it is "the Godfather II of game sequels, and it further cements Monolith's spot at the top of the 3D gaming world." The game also won the magazine's "Best Music", "Best Writing" and "Best AI" awards. It was nominated for PC Gamer US' "2002 Best Action Game" and Computer Gaming World's "Action Game of the Year" awards, both of which ultimately went to Medal of Honor: Allied Assault. The latter magazine's staff called it "among the funniest and most entertaining games of 2002."

The game won GameSpot's annual "Best Single-Player Action Game on PC" award, and was nominated in the "Best Sound on PC", "Best Graphics (Technical) on PC", "Best Graphics (Artistic) on PC" and "Game of the Year on PC" categories. The game also received nominations for "Computer First-Person Action Game of the Year" and "Outstanding Achievement in Sound Design" at the AIAS' 6th Annual Interactive Achievement Awards; the awards were ultimately given to Medal of Honor: Allied Assault and Medal of Honor: Frontline, respectively.

== Legacy and fan-made re-release ==
In 2017, both the original game and the sequel were released with fan-made patches as free downloads at the No One Lives Forever Revival Project.
