= S.H.I.E.L.D. =

Fictional intelligence agency in the Marvel Comics Universe

- The organization's logo, as shown on the issue of Secret War: From the Files of Nick Fury #1 (May 2005)

Publication information
- Publisher: Marvel Comics
- First appearance: Strange Tales #135 (August 1965)
- Created by: Stan Lee (writer); Jack Kirby (artist)

In-story information
- Type of organization: Intelligence agency Special law enforcement
- Base(s): The Helicarrier; Triskelion

Roster

S.H.I.E.L.D. is a fictional espionage, special law enforcement, and counter-terrorism government agency appearing in American comic books published by Marvel Comics. Created by Stan Lee and Jack Kirby, this agency first appeared in Strange Tales #135 (August 1965), and often deals with paranormal activity and superhuman threats to international security.

The acronym originally stood for Supreme Headquarters, International Espionage and Law-Enforcement Division. It was changed in 1991 to Strategic Hazard Intervention Espionage Logistics Directorate. Within media set in the Marvel Cinematic Universe, as well as multiple animated and live-action television series, the backronym stands for Strategic Homeland Intervention, Enforcement and Logistics Division.

The organization has heavily appeared in media adaptations as well as films and shows that take place in the Marvel Cinematic Universe.

== Publication history ==
S.H.I.E.L.D.'s introduction in the Strange Tales featuring "Nick Fury, Agent of S.H.I.E.L.D." occurred during a trend for action series about secret international intelligence agencies with catchy acronyms, such as television's The Man from U.N.C.L.E., which Stan Lee stated in a 2014 interview, was the basis for him to create the organization. Colonel Fury (initially the lead character of Marvel Comics' World War II series Sgt. Fury and his Howling Commandos) was reimagined as a slightly older character with an eyepatch (which he lacked in his wartime adventures) and appointed head of the organization. Some characters from the Sgt. Fury series reappeared as agents of S.H.I.E.L.D., most notably Timothy "Dum-Dum" Dugan, Fury's bowler hat-wearing aide-de-camp.

Its most persistent enemy is Hydra, a criminal organization founded (after some retcon) by Baron Strucker.

Strange Tales #135 (August 1965), the debut of S.H.I.E.L.D. Cover art by Jack Kirby and Frank Giacoia

S.H.I.E.L.D. was presented as an extant, full-blown entity in its first appearance, with Tony Stark in charge of the Special Weaponry section and Fury seeing "some of the most famous joes from every nation" (then "half the leaders of the free world" a page later) at a meeting of the Supreme International Council. Much was revealed over the years to fill in its labyrinthine organizational history. Stan Lee wrote each story, abetted by artist Kirby's co-plotting or full plotting, through Strange Tales #152 (January 1967), except for two issues, one scripted by Kirby himself (#148) and one by Dennis O'Neil (#149). Following an issue scripted by Roy Thomas (#153), and one co-written by Thomas and new series artist Jim Steranko, came the sole-writer debut of soon-to-become industry legend Steranko—who had begun on the feature as a penciller-inker of Kirby layouts in #151 (December 1966), taken over the every-other-issue "Nick Fury" cover art with #153 two months later, and full writing with #155 (April 1967).

Steranko quickly established the feature as one of comics history's most groundbreaking, innovative, and acclaimed. Ron Goulart wrote,

[E]ven the dullest of readers could sense that something new was happening. … Which each passing issue Steranko's efforts became more and more innovative. Entire pages would be devoted to photocollages of drawings [that] ignored panel boundaries and instead worked together on planes of depth. The first pages ... became incredible production numbers similar in design to the San Francisco rock concert poster of the period.

Larry Hama said Steranko "combined the figurative dynamism of Jack Kirby with modern design concepts. The graphic influences of Peter Max, Op Art, and Andy Warhol were embedded into the design of the pages—and the pages were designed as a whole, not just as a series of panels. All this, executed in a crisp, hard-edged style, seething with drama and anatomical tension".

The series won 1967 and 1968 Alley Awards and was inducted in the latter year to the awards' Hall of Fame. Steranko himself was inducted into the Comic Book Hall of Fame in 2006. The 12-page feature ran through Strange Tales #168 (sharing that "split book" with the occult feature "Doctor Strange" each issue), after which it was spun off onto its own series of the same title, running 15 issues (June 1968 – Nov. 1969), followed by three all-reprint issues beginning a year later (Nov. 1970 – Mar. 1971). Steranko wrote and drew issues #1–3 and #5, and drew the covers of #1–7.

New S.H.I.E.L.D. stories would not appear for nearly two decades after the first solo title. A six-issue miniseries, Nick Fury vs. S.H.I.E.L.D. (June–November 1988) was followed by Nick Fury, Agent of S.H.I.E.L.D. (vol. 2). This second series lasted 47 issues (September 1989 – May 1993); its pivotal story arc was "the Deltite Affair", in which many S.H.I.E.L.D. agents were replaced with Life Model Decoy androids in a takeover attempt.

A year after that series ended, the one-shot Fury (May 1994) retconned the events of those previous two series, recasting them as a series of staged events designed to distract Fury from the resurrection plans of Hydra head von Strucker. The following year, writer Howard Chaykin and penciler Corky Lehmkuhl produced the four-issue miniseries Fury of S.H.I.E.L.D. (April–July 1995). Various publications have additionally focused on Nick Fury's solo adventures, such as the graphic novels and one-shots Wolverine/Nick Fury: The Scorpio Connection (1989), Wolverine/Nick Fury: Scorpio Rising (October 1994), Fury/Black Widow: Death Duty and Captain America and Nick Fury: Blood Truce (both February 1995), and Captain America and Nick Fury: The Otherworld War (October 2001).

=== Titles ===
==== Nick Fury, Agent of S.H.I.E.L.D. ====
Nick Fury, Agent of S.H.I.E.L.D. is a comic book series published by Marvel Comics, that first premiered in Strange Tales and later became several ongoing series.

==== Nick Fury vs. S.H.I.E.L.D. ====
Nick Fury vs. S.H.I.E.L.D. is a comic book miniseries published by Marvel Comics, that first premiered in 1988.

==== Fury of S.H.I.E.L.D. ====
Fury of S.H.I.E.L.D. is a comic book miniseries published by Marvel Comics, that first premiered in 1995.

==== Kitty Pryde, Agent of S.H.I.E.L.D. ====
Kitty Pryde, Agent of S.H.I.E.L.D. is a comic book series published by Marvel Comics, that first premiered in 1997.

==== S.H.I.E.L.D. ====
S.H.I.E.L.D. is a comic book title published by Marvel Comics. The first series premiered with a first issue cover dated June 2010. It details the secret history of the occult organization S.H.I.E.L.D. aka "The Brotherhood of the Shield". The series is written by Jonathan Hickman and drawn by Dustin Weaver. The second series premiered with a first issue cover dated December 2014. Loosely based on the TV series Agents of S.H.I.E.L.D., it was written by Mark Waid. It was superseded by Agents of S.H.I.E.L.D.

==== Howling Commandos of S.H.I.E.L.D. ====
Howling Commandos of S.H.I.E.L.D. is a comic book series published by Marvel Comics, premiering with a first issue cover dated in 2015.

==== S.H.I.E.L.D. 50th anniversary ====
To celebrate the 50th anniversary of the organization's creation, Marvel in 2015 released five one-shots each focusing on different aspects of S.H.I.E.L.D.: Agent Carter: S.H.I.E.L.D. 50th Anniversary, The Cavalry: S.H.I.E.L.D. 50th Anniversary, Fury: S.H.I.E.L.D. 50th Anniversary, Mockingbird: S.H.I.E.L.D. 50th Anniversary and Quake: S.H.I.E.L.D. 50th Anniversary.

==== Agents of S.H.I.E.L.D. ====
Agents of S.H.I.E.L.D. is a comic book series published by Marvel Comics, premiering with a first issue cover dated in 2016.

== Fictional organizational history ==
Usually led by Nick Fury as executive director (although he reports to a twelve-member council, whose identities even he does not know), this organization often operates as much as a covert agency as a quasi-military one, initially depicted as affiliated with the United States government. Later, S.H.I.E.L.D. was depicted as under the jurisdiction of the United Nations, with vast technological resources at its disposal, with U.N. General Assembly Resolutions and legislation passed in signatory nations aiding many of their operations. However, S.H.I.E.L.D. has been inconsistently portrayed as under U.S., rather than UN, control—for instance, in Astonishing X-Men (vol. 3) #3, Nick Fury explains S.H.I.E.L.D.'s inaction during an incident of genocide by stating that it did not occur on American soil.

S.H.I.E.L.D. started off as a top-secret international organization (Fury was unaware of them when he was in the CIA) with a Supreme International Council made up of top officials and minds from across the world, including Tony Stark. Its first director was Rick Stoner, former head of the CIA, but he was quickly assassinated by Hydra, and the President of the United States recommended Nick Fury take the role. Later on, the ultimate authority of S.H.I.E.L.D. is revealed to be a cabal of 12 mysterious men and women who give Fury his orders and operational structure, leaving Fury to manage the actual implementation of these orders and stratagems.

One of S.H.I.E.L.D.'s unique technological innovations, the LMD (Life Model Decoy)—an extremely lifelike android used to replace people in imminent danger of being killed—was the basis for two major upheavals. First, the supervillain Scorpio stole the technology and used it to create the second team of villains called the Zodiac. Later, some LMDs known as the Deltites achieved sentience and infiltrated S.H.I.E.L.D. and Hydra both, replacing key members until Fury defeated them. This led to the disbanding of the original organization and its replacement by a new task force with the same acronym under the control of the U.N. ("Strategic Hazard Intervention, Espionage and Logistics Directorate") The new S.H.I.E.L.D. was meant to be more streamlined so Fury could personally oversee it, but would soon become a large organization again.

In the wake of a disastrous unauthorized mission in Latveria, Fury effectively resigned as executive director, with international warrants out for his arrest. His first successor was not one of his closer associates but a relatively unknown newcomer to the S.H.I.E.L.D. hierarchy, Maria Hill. A transcript of a conversation between Hill and the President of the United States revealed she was chosen for the post by United Nations consensus to keep Fury loyalists out of the job and to keep relations with the superhero community to a minimum. The President also expected Hill—an American—to be loyal first to the U.S., despite S.H.I.E.L.D. being a UN-chartered organization.

The passage of the United States Superhuman Registration Act and the subsequent superhero "Civil War" created an additional political and ethical irritant between S.H.I.E.L.D. and the superhuman community, with S.H.I.E.L.D. tasked to lead enforcement and to take on registered superheroes as operatives.

Toward the end of the conflict, Hill concluded she had been made director with the intent that she fails at the job, and she proposes to Tony Stark that he assume the post himself, with her as deputy. Stark accepts the appointment as director upon the conclusion of the superhuman Civil War and undertakes a series of initiatives, including the construction of a new gold-and-red Helicarrier in the motif of his Iron Man armor designs, the introduction of a daycare center in the Helicarrier, and an employee suggestion-box. While accused of treating S.H.I.E.L.D. as a Stark Industries subsidiary, he succeeded in streamlining the organization and raising morale. S.H.I.E.L.D. fought a wave of global superhuman terrorism and was manipulated into two international incidents that almost saw Director Stark arrested until they revealed the Mandarin to be behind it and stopped him from committing genocide with an Extremis pathogen.

At the start of the Secret Invasion by the extraterrestrial shape-shifting race the Skrulls, the Helicarrier is disabled by a Skrull virus and left floating and disabled in the Bermuda Triangle. The Skrulls by this point have already replaced a large number of S.H.I.E.L.D. agents, including the high-ranking Timothy "Dum-Dum" Dugan. After the invasion is repelled, the President of the United States decides to dissolve S.H.I.E.L.D., and has it, the Fifty State Initiative, and the Avengers replaced by the Thunderbolts Initiative, which is placed under the supervision of Norman Osborn.

Osborn uses the opportunity to transform S.H.I.E.L.D. into a new organization called "H.A.M.M.E.R.", formed by loyal agents of the Thunderbolts Initiative as well as former agents of S.H.I.E.L.D. and Hydra. The Thunderbolts are officially disbanded in the process as well and turned into a black-ops force that answers only to Osborn. Meanwhile, H.A.M.M.E.R. also operates alongside the newest, and only government-sponsored Avengers team, the Dark Avengers.

After the Invasion, Fury discovers that S.H.I.E.L.D. itself had been under the control of the terrorist organization Hydra, ostensibly from its very beginning.

After the conclusion of the Secret Warriors ongoing series, S.H.I.E.L.D. was reformed with Fury leaving it under the control of its new director, Daisy Johnson. The new S.H.I.E.L.D. subsequently saved US Army Ranger Marcus Johnson from mercenaries hired by Leviathan. When he discovered he was the son of Nick Fury, Marcus (whose birth name was Nick Fury Jr.) and his army friend Phil Coulson joined S.H.I.E.L.D. Maria Hill and the rest of S.H.I.E.L.D. later formed an incarnation of the Secret Avengers.

During the Avengers: Standoff! storyline, S.H.I.E.L.D. establishes a gated community called Pleasant Hill to serve as a supervillain prison. Using Kobik, S.H.I.E.L.D. converts the inmates into the mild-mannered residents of Pleasant Hill.

Following the "Avengers: Standoff" storyline, S.H.I.E.L.D. is given broad new powers under the S.H.I.E.L.D. Act, including a clause that allows the Director of S.H.I.E.L.D. to gain control of the United States in the event of an emergency. Soon after, Steve Rogers is appointed the new director of S.H.I.E.L.D. During the Secret Empire storyline, Rogers is revealed to be a Hydra sleeper agent and uses the S.H.I.E.L.D. Act to become dictator of the United States. After he is defeated, S.H.I.E.L.D. is once again disbanded.

S.H.I.E.L.D. has remained out of action since its disbandment, though individual members have been active. Its assets were divided among various U.S. government agencies such as a War Machine armor given to the Air Force and later stolen by Nick Fury Jr. and Frank Castle.

Maria Hill would later recruit Nick Fury Jr into a new organisation, a quasi-official offshoot of the C.I.A. using the same branding: Super-Human Intelligence: Extra Legal Division.

=== Organizational structure and procedure ===
Over the decades, various writers have depicted S.H.I.E.L.D.'s organizational structure in several different ways. The Official Handbook of the Marvel Universe (first edition) describes an eight-level ranking structure (technician, administrator, field agent, regional officer, special officer, regional director, special director, executive director), although providing almost no detail on other aspects of the Directorate's internal makeup. Years later, the miniseries Agents of Atlas mentioned a position of "sub-director", and seemed to indicate that the administrative department of S.H.I.E.L.D. it itself referred to simply as "Directorate".

Most of S.H.I.E.L.D.'s agents are normal humans. S.H.I.E.L.D. does employ some superhumans, including in its Psi-Division, composed of telepathic agents who deal with like menaces. S.H.I.E.L.D. also obtains help from independent heroes when their special abilities are needed. It has also accepted some superheroes and supervillains as members, but not in a separate unit.

Its headquarters is the Helicarrier, a massive flying aircraft carrier kept airborne at all times and, among other things, containing a squadron of jet fighters and housing an intercontinental ballistic missile (ICBM). In addition, S.H.I.E.L.D. maintains strong ties to the superhero community, especially Captain America, the Avengers, and the Fantastic Four, and often calls upon that community for aid on particular missions.

In the 2000s, depictions of S.H.I.E.L.D. imply a hierarchy of security clearance levels used either in place of or alongside, the previously described rank structure. The security-clearance hierarchy operates on a scale ranging from "Level One", the lowest, to "Level Ten", described by Maria Hill, executive director at the time, as the highest security clearance anyone of any government can have. Hill's own clearance, cited in the New Avengers ongoing series, was Level Eight.

=== Prominent members ===
Throughout its existence, S.H.I.E.L.D. has been most prominently led by Nick Fury, with Maria Hill succeeding him in mid-2000s stories. She voluntarily stepped down in a 2007 story, becoming deputy director to Tony Stark. Other historically prominent members, who have appeared from the earliest stories to the modern-day, include Thaddeus "Dum Dum" Dugan and Gabriel "Gabe" Jones, both veterans of Fury's World War II Howling Commandos, though their youthful longevity has not, unlike Fury's, been explained in Marvel continuity; Contessa Valentina Allegra de la Fontaine; Clay Quartermain (Agent 9); Jasper Sitwell (Agent 12); and Sharon Carter (Agent 13), all introduced in the 1960s; and Jimmy Woo, introduced in the 1950s comic Yellow Claw and reintroduced in the '60s.

Prior to the events of the Civil War, Captain America estimated there to be 3,000 agents on active duty.

=== Bases of operation ===
Although the various Helicarriers built over the years have long been considered S.H.I.E.L.D.'s primary mobile home base, the Directorate also maintains a number of land bases throughout the world, most notably "S.H.I.E.L.D. Central" in New York City. While some of these bases are publicly accessible on a limited basis, most are not publicly disclosed for reasons of planetary security. There are several fully equipped S.H.I.E.L.D. fall-out shelters scattered around the world, with twenty-eight of these being known only to Nick Fury. During the events of Civil War, Nick Fury was hiding in an American-based shelter. He also divulged the location of one to Captain America, so the Resistance to the Superhuman Registration Act could use it as a safe house.

== Related organizations ==
The following organizations are related to S.H.I.E.L.D.:

=== A.R.M.O.R. ===
A.R.M.O.R. (Altered-Reality Monitoring and Operational Response Agency) is a sister agency to S.H.I.E.L.D. that monitors alternate reality incursions into Earth-616, and is directed by Charles Little Sky. It was introduced in the Marvel Zombies 3 limited series, written by Fred Van Lente. Van Lente stated that A.R.M.O.R. "has existed with them this whole time, but it's been so incredibly secret that no one at Marvel knew about it". In the comics it is stated that A.R.M.O.R. is so secret that it 'makes S.W.O.R.D. look like S.H.I.E.L.D., and S.H.I.E.L.D. look like the Post Office'. During Dark Reign, A.R.M.O.R. operates under the oversight of H.A.M.M.E.R. but Osborn wanted to fully absorb A.R.M.O.R. into H.A.M.M.E.R. They were able to keep out of Osborn's clutches when their newest agent, Lyra downloaded incriminating evidence against him.

=== H.A.M.M.E.R. ===
H.A.M.M.E.R. replaces S.H.I.E.L.D. after it is dissolved when Norman Osborn is appointed the new head following the conclusion of the Skrull attack. Former S.H.I.E.L.D. agents and members of Hydra are hired as agents. H.A.M.M.E.R. promotes Osborn's personal team of Avengers, a group composed mostly of former Thunderbolts members and former members of the Mighty Avengers. Osborn also eliminates all of Tony Stark's influence on S.H.I.E.L.D., including the Cape-Killer Armor and the Red and Gold Helicarrier. He also replaces all agents loyal to Nick Fury, Captain America, or Iron Man with agents loyal to himself.

=== S.P.E.A.R. ===
S.P.E.A.R.—in the pages of Avengers World—is a Chinese intelligence-gathering organization created for homeland security and has a flying headquarters called the Circle. It was created by the Chinese government to be on the same level as S.H.I.E.L.D. following Thanos' invasion of Earth. Falcon first encountered S.P.E.A.R. and their director, Xian Zheng, at the time when Gorgon planned to launch an attack on China. When the Hand attacked the Circle, they deployed their own superhuman response team called the Ascendants which consists of Devastator, Monkey King, Sabre, Vector, and Weather Witch.

=== S.T.R.I.K.E. ===
S.T.R.I.K.E. (Special Tactical Response for International Key Emergencies) was a British agency, unrelated to but run along similar lines to S.H.I.E.L.D. Disbanded after being infiltrated and taken over by a criminal organization, one of its members was the future X-Man Psylocke. It was introduced in Marvel UK's Captain Britain #17 (February 2, 1977).

=== EuroM.I.N.D. and S.H.A.P.E. ===
EuroM.I.N.D. (European Monitoring Investigation and Enforcement Division) is a European subdivision of S.H.I.E.L.D. that later fell under the control of the S.H.A.P.E. (Supreme Headquarters Allied Powers Europe) council. EuroM.I.N.D.'s director is François Borillon. Its agents include the science reconnaissance group Eurolab and the combat specialist Task Force group, who both then merged into one group known as Euroforce.

=== S.T.A.K.E. ===
S.T.A.K.E. (Special Threat Assessment for Known Extranormalities) is a S.H.I.E.L.D. subsidiary that specializes in dealing with supernatural occurrences. S.T.A.K.E. first appeared in S.H.I.E.L.D. Vol. 3 #9 (October 2015) and was created by Al Ewing and Stefano Caselli.

=== S.W.O.R.D. ===
S.W.O.R.D. (Sentient World Observation and Response Department), works with S.H.I.E.L.D. but specializes in extraterrestrial threats. It is first introduced in Astonishing X-Men (vol. 3) #6 (December 2004), written by Joss Whedon. Dialogue in the stories depicting both organizations has been ambiguous on whether S.W.O.R.D. is a branch of S.H.I.E.L.D. or a sister agency.

A similar group as S.W.O.R.D., likewise affiliated with the U.N., is Starcore, which has worked with S.H.I.E.L.D. on several projects of joint interest, including establishing and maintaining a crewed facility on Earth's Moon.

=== W.A.N.D. ===
W.A.N.D. (Wizardry, Alchemy and Necromancy Department) is a division of S.H.I.E.L.D that specializes in matters relating to magic. It is directed by Pandora Peters. First appearing in Thunderbolts Annual Vol.2 (2014), in which the Thunderbolts are recruited to assassinate Doctor Strange, who is eventually revealed as a faerie impostor called King Oberoth'm'gozz.

=== Orchis ===
Orchis is an anti-mutant organization that was formed by former members of S.H.I.E.L.D., among other groups.

== Reception ==
=== Critical reception ===
Screen Rant included S.H.I.E.L.D. in their "10 Best Teams That Captain America Has Joined In Marvel Comics" list. CBR.com ranked S.H.I.E.L.D. 1st in their "10 Most Powerful Secret Organizations In Marvel Comics" list, 5th in their "5 Instantly Recognizable Symbols In Marvel Comics" list, 5th in their "5 Instantly Recognizable Symbols In Marvel Comics" list, 5th in their "Every Marvel Superhero Team" list, 6th in their "5 Best & 5 Worst Spy Organizations In Comics" list, 7th in their "Avengers' 10 Best Allies In Marvel Comics" list, and 9th in their "10 Most Effective Comic Book Prisons" list.

== Other versions ==
=== Amalgam Comics ===
S.H.I.E.L.D. (Strategic Hazard Intervention Espionage Logistics Directorate) is the Amalgam Comics equivalent of S.H.I.E.L.D. S.H.I.E.L.D. was created by Nick Fury and Sgt. Rock after World War II to combat Hydra. Both founders later trained and recruited Bruce Wayne into their ranks, who would become the new director of S.H.I.E.L.D. Members of S.H.I.E.L.D. in the Amalgam universe include Moonwing, Tony Stark, Sgt. Rock, Nick Fury, and Sue Storm, a member of the Challengers of the Fantastic.

=== House of M ===
In the House of M universe, S.H.I.E.L.D. consists entirely of mutants, who dominate society rather than humans. Sebastian Shaw is the executive director of S.H.I.E.L.D., with Wolverine, Rogue, Jessica Drew, Kurt Wagner, Mortimer Toynbee, and Raven Darkholme appearing as leading agents and the Marauders appearing as S.H.I.E.L.D.'s black ops unit.

=== Mutant X ===
In Mutant X, S.H.I.E.L.D. is an anti-mutant group whose name is an acronym for "Saviours of Humanity by Intervention in the Evolution of Life-form Deviants".

=== Ultimate Marvel ===
S.H.I.E.L.D. in the Ultimate Marvel parallel universe was first led by General Thunderbolt Ross. During the Gulf War, the Weapon X project, headed by John Wraith, was sanctioned by S.H.I.E.L.D. and resulted in the creation of Wolverine. After Ross retired, Nick Fury was selected as the organization's executive director. His first actions were to shut down Weapon X and resurrect the Super Soldier program, commissioning Richard Parker, Bruce Banner, Franklin Storm, and Hank Pym to try to recreate the formula that made Captain America. S.H.I.E.L.D.'s attempts to recreate the formula led to Banner, Norman Osborn, Peter Parker, Flint Marko, and Maxwell Dillon gaining superpowers

After the events of Ultimate Power, S.H.I.E.L.D. is under the directorship of Carol Danvers, as Nick Fury was temporarily stranded in the Supreme Power Universe. After "Ultimatum", Fury returns and becomes the head of S.H.I.E.L.D.'s black ops division. After the death of Spider-Man, Marvin Flumm is promoted to director of S.H.I.E.L.D. by the U.S. President. Monica Chang, Fury's ex-wife, becomes director after Flumm is dismissed. S.H.I.E.L.D. is later disassembled after the events of "Cataclysm" and the destruction caused by Galactus's attack.

In the Ultimate Marvel universe, S.H.I.E.L.D. is controlled entirely by the United States but maintains ties with the European Defense Initiative (EDI) and the British-operated S.T.R.I.K.E.

Members

Divisions

- Psi
- Black-Ops
- Eye
- Combat-Unit

=== S.A.F.E. ===
S.A.F.E. (Strategic Action For Emergencies)—introduced in Marvel's line of novels in the mid-1990s—is the United States' answer to S.H.I.E.L.D. It first appeared in Spider-Man & the Incredible Hulk: Rampage (Doom's Day Book 1), and may not be part of the comics canon, although the novels it appears in have been referred to several times in Marvel's Handbooks. Whereas S.H.I.E.L.D. is a U.N.-chartered organization dealing with international incidents, S.A.F.E. is tasked with similar duties inside America's borders. It is run by Colonel Sean Morgan. A prominently featured agent is Joshua Ballard, who, among other things, survived an encounter with Doctor Doom and later Baron Zemo.

In the novel Secret of the Sinister Six, S.A.F.E. agent Clyde Fury (no relation to Nick Fury) distinguishes between espionage agencies (such as S.H.I.E.L.D.) and strategic action specialists such as S.A.F.E.

=== H.A.T.E. ===
H.A.T.E. (Highest Anti Terrorism Effort) is a parody of S.H.I.E.L.D. created for Marvel Comics' 12-issue series Nextwave by comics author Warren Ellis. The leader of H.A.T.E., General Dirk Anger, is a parody of Nick Fury. H.A.T.E. is a secretive organization with suspect motives led by Anger, who has self-control and sexual issues.

=== H.A.N.D. ===
H.A.N.D. (Heroic Anomaly Neutralization Directorate) is the equivalent of S.H.I.E.L.D in the Ultimate Universe imprint. H.A.N.D. is a police group that serves the Maker, spreading disinformation through its Narrative Division and using a widespread mass surveillance apparatus to eliminate or imprison possible dissidents. H.A.N.D. is directed by a Nick Fury Life Model Decoy, which is regularly replaced if it develops a consciousness.

== Depictions in translation ==
S.H.I.E.L.D. stories have been translated into several other languages, including French, Finnish and Italian. Occasionally, these translations will show S.H.I.E.L.D. with an altered name.

In the case of selected French editions, the name of the agency was depicted as S.E.R.V.O., which sounds like "brain" (cerveau) in French. In later editions, S.H.I.E.L.D is maintained, with the acronym translated as Stratégie, Habilité, Intervention, Exécution et Logistique Défensive (Strategy, Empowered, Intervention, Enforcement, and Logistics Defensive).

In Finnish the name that applies to S.H.I.E.L.D. in mainstream Marvel continuity is Y.P.K.V.V. (Ylimmäisen Päämajan Kansainvälisen Vakoilun Vastustamisjaos), a direct translation of the original English. In translations of the Ultimate Marvel comics, the name is K.I.L.P.I., with "kilpi" being the translation for the word (as opposed to the acronym) "shield".

In Greek, the organization name is Α.Σ.Π.Ι.Δ.Α. (pronounced ASPIDA, meaning "shield" in Greek). The initials stand for Supreme Military and Political Foundation of International Counter-espionage (Ανώτατο Στρατιωτικό Πολιτικό Ίδρυμα Διεθνούς Αντικατασκοπείας).

In Brazilian Portuguese editions, the acronym S.H.I.E.L.D. has generally been retained, with different Portuguese expansions devised to match the organization's changing English backronyms rather than translating them literally. The original Supreme Headquarters International Espionage Law-Enforcement Division was rendered as "Serviço Hipersecreto de Inteligência, Execução da Lei e Defesa" (literally, "Hyper-secret Intelligence, Law Enforcement, and Defense Service") in Salvat's 2016 Brazilian edition of Nick Fury, Agente da S.H.I.E.L.D. Parte Um. The later Strategic Hazard Intervention Espionage Logistics Directorate was rendered as "Superintendência Humana de Intervenção, Espionagem, Logística e Dissuasão" (literally, "Human Superintendence of Intervention, Espionage, Logistics and Deterrence") in Salvat's Os Heróis Mais Poderosos da Marvel: Nick Fury. For Strategic Homeland Intervention, Enforcement and Logistics Division, Panini Comics used "Superintendência Humana de Intervenções Estratégicas, Logística e Defesa" (literally, "Human Superintendence of Strategic Interventions, Logistics and Defense"). This wording appeared in Capitão América & Gavião Arqueiro #1 in 2013, and was later printed on the front cover of Agentes da S.H.I.E.L.D.: Tiro Perfeito in 2017.

In Dutch the name S.C.H.I.L.D. (schild = shield) has been used by the publisher Williams, but was dropped by Junior Press in favor of S.H.I.E.L.D.

In Mexico, it was translated by La Prensa and later Novedades, as C.I.D.E.L., Centro Internacional De Espionaje Legal (International Center of Legal Espionage), but later Novedades changed the acronym to C.S.E.I., Cuartel Supremo de Espionaje e Inteligencia (Supreme Headquarters of Espionage and Intelligence).

In Spain, the initial publisher Vértice translated S.H.I.E.L.D. as "Escudo" (always without a determinant), but never showed the meaning. Later publisher Planeta DeAgostini used the name S.H.I.E.L.D., but translating the acronym as "Organización Internacional para la Ejecución y el Cumplimiento de la Ley" (international organisation for implementation and fulfillment of law). It has been suggested, as a joke, that the acronym does not correspond to the meaning because the acronym itself is undercover. Now, Panini translates the acronym as "Servicio Homologado de Inteligencia, Espionaje, Logística y Defensa" (Accredited Service of Intelligence, Espionage, Logistics, and Defense) to keep the original acronym; being this the name used in the current movies or series.

In Danish, S.H.I.E.L.D. was originally known as S.K.J.O.L.D., "Skjold" being the Danish word for a shield, though the meaning of the abbreviation would differ.

In Russian, S.H.I.E.L.D. is named Щ.И.Т. (pronounced SCHIT; "shield" in Russian) or З.А.Щ.И.Т.А. (ZASCHITA, meaning "protection"). This name often describes as Sixth Intervention Logistics Agency (Шестая Интервенционная Тактико-оперативная логистическая служба).

In Poland, S.H.I.E.L.D. is known as T.A.R.C.Z.A. ("shield" in Polish). This name describes as Secret Agency of Anti-terrorist Cybernetics Applications Development (Tajna Agencja Rozwoju Cybernetycznych Zastosowań Antyterrorystycznych).

== In other media ==
=== Television ===
==== Animation ====
- S.H.I.E.L.D. appears in the Spider-Man and His Amazing Friends episode "Mission: Save the Guardstar".
- S.H.I.E.L.D. appears in the second season of Iron Man.
- S.H.I.E.L.D. appears in Spider-Man: The Animated Series, consisting of Nick Fury and Agent 1.
- S.H.I.E.L.D. appears in X-Men: Evolution.
- S.H.I.E.L.D. appears in The Super Hero Squad Show, consisting of Nick Fury and Ms. Marvel.
- S.H.I.E.L.D. appears in Iron Man: Armored Adventures.
- S.H.I.E.L.D. appears in a flashback in the Marvel Anime: Wolverine episode "Omega Red".
- S.H.I.E.L.D. appears in The Avengers: Earth's Mightiest Heroes.
- S.H.I.E.L.D. appears in Ultimate Spider-Man (2012), consisting of Nick Fury and Phil Coulson as leading members, Midtown High's janitor Stan as a founding member who created the organization's name, and Spider-Man, White Tiger, Power Man, Iron Fist, and Nova as students.
- S.H.I.E.L.D. appears in Avengers Assemble.
- S.H.I.E.L.D. appears in Hulk and the Agents of S.M.A.S.H..
- S.H.I.E.L.D. appears in Moon Girl and Devil Dinosaur.

=== Film ===
- S.H.I.E.L.D. appears in Nick Fury: Agent of S.H.I.E.L.D.. Following Nick Fury's exile, the organization falls under the control of Jack Pincer.
- S.H.I.E.L.D. appears in Iron Man: Rise of Technovore.
- S.H.I.E.L.D. appears in Avengers Confidential: Black Widow & Punisher.

=== Marvel Cinematic Universe ===
==== Films ====
S.H.I.E.L.D. appears in several films set in the Marvel Cinematic Universe.

- S.H.I.E.L.D. is first referenced in Iron Man when Agent Phil Coulson attempts to talk with Tony Stark about his escape from captivity. In a post-credits scene, Stark meets Nick Fury, played by Samuel L. Jackson, who says he wants to talk to him about the "Avengers Initiative".
- S.H.I.E.L.D. is briefly referenced in The Incredible Hulk, where it is revealed that the organization knew of Bruce Banner's experiments in gamma radiation. Later, General Ross states that Banner and his partner's aliases "have been added to the S.H.I.E.L.D. Operations Database". In the post-credits scene, Ross is approached by Tony Stark, who reveals that they were gathering a "team".
- S.H.I.E.L.D. appears in Iron Man 2. Black Widow is introduced as an agent of S.H.I.E.L.D., and Howard Stark is stated to have been a founding member. In the post-credits scene, Coulson arrives in Albuquerque, New Mexico, and discovers Thor's hammer Mjölnir.
- S.H.I.E.L.D. appears in Thor. In a follow-up to the post-credits scene of Iron Man 2, Coulson leads a S.H.I.E.L.D. team to protect Mjölnir. In the film's post-credits scene, Fury recruits Erik Selvig to study the Tesseract.
- S.H.I.E.L.D. appears in Captain America: The First Avenger, where they greet Steve Rogers following his arrival in the modern day.
- S.H.I.E.L.D. is featured in The Avengers. Nick Fury, Phil Coulson, Natasha Romanoff, Jasper Sitwell, and Clint Barton appear, as well as Deputy Director Maria Hill (portrayed by Cobie Smulders).
- S.H.I.E.L.D. appears in Iron Man 3.
- S.H.I.E.L.D. appears in Captain America: The Winter Soldier with Captain America as a S.H.I.E.L.D. agent, along with Black Widow, Nick Fury, Maria Hill, Jasper Sitwell, Sharon Carter, Brock Rumlow, Jack Rollins, and Alexander Pierce. Pierce, Rumlow, Rollins, and Sitwell are revealed to be sleeper agents of Hydra, leading to the organization disbanding.
- In Avengers: Age of Ultron, S.H.I.E.L.D. is said to have collapsed. Fury appears to encourage the Avengers while Hill now works for Stark. Fury later appears at the final battle in Sokovia, evacuating the country during Ultron's attack.
- S.H.I.E.L.D. appears in a flashback in Ant-Man, which reveals Hank Pym and Janet Van Dyne to have been agents during the Cold War.
- S.H.I.E.L.D. appears in Captain Marvel, with Talos posing as Fury's boss, R. Keller.
- An alternate version of S.H.I.E.L.D. appears in Avengers: Endgame. When Steve Rogers, Tony Stark, and Scott Lang quantum travel to an alternate 2012, they encounter Hydra sleeper agents posing as S.H.I.E.L.D. operatives. Stark disguises himself in a S.H.I.E.L.D. uniform. Later, Rogers and Stark travel to an alternate 1970 to steal the Tesseract from S.H.I.E.L.D.'s base in Camp Lehigh.
- In Spider-Man: Far From Home, a S.H.I.E.L.D. agent makes a stealth suit and gives it to Peter Parker in Europe.

==== Television ====
- A S.H.I.E.L.D. television series was greenlit by ABC in 2012, first aired as Marvel's Agents of S.H.I.E.L.D., on September 24, 2013, and concluded on August 12, 2020.
- Alternate versions of S.H.I.E.L.D. appear in the animated series What If...?
- In Hawkeye, it is revealed that Laura Barton is a former S.H.I.E.L.D. agent.

==== One-Shots ====
S.H.I.E.L.D. was featured in the Marvel One-Shots films (which tie into the Marvel Cinematic Universe):

- The Marvel One-Shots film The Consultant featured Phil Coulson and Jasper Sitwell trying to keep the World Security Council from putting Abomination into their services.
- The Marvel One-Shots film A Funny Thing Happened on the Way to Thor's Hammer features Phil Coulson traveling to New Mexico between Iron Man 2 and Thor.
- The Marvel One-Shots film Item 47 featured Agent Blake (portrayed by Titus Welliver) who helps Jasper Sitwell secure "Item 47" (a discarded Chitauri gun) which ended up in the possession of a down-on-their-luck couple named Bennie and Claire (portrayed by Jesse Bradford and Lizzy Caplan). In the aftermath, the couple joins up with S.H.I.E.L.D. where Bennie is assigned to the R&D "think-tank" to reverse engineer the Chitauri technology, and Claire becomes Blake's assistant.
- The Marvel One-Shots film Agent Carter features Peggy Carter being made an offer to lead S.H.I.E.L.D. by Howard Stark. Timothy "Dum Dum" Dugan (portrayed by Neal McDonough) also appears.

=== Video games ===
- S.H.I.E.L.D. appears in the 2005 video game The Punisher.
- S.H.I.E.L.D. appears in Ultimate Spider-Man (2005).
- S.H.I.E.L.D. appears in Marvel: Ultimate Alliance. Known members include Nick Fury and Dum Dum Dugan. After the Masters of Evil attack the S.H.I.E.L.D. Helicarrier U.N.N. Alpha, S.H.I.E.L.D. subsequently oversees the creation of a special strike force of heroes to oppose the Masters of Evil.
- S.H.I.E.L.D. appears in Spider-Man: Friend or Foe. They work to stop Mysterio's P.H.A.N.T.O.M. invasion around the globe, recruiting several superheroes and villains such as Spider-Man, Black Cat, and Prowler to provide assistance.
- S.H.I.E.L.D. appears in Spider-Man: Web of Shadows. They arrive in New York to help Spider-Man fight off the symbiote invasion and set up a base at Stark Tower. S.H.I.E.L.D. agents serve as allies and can offer various missions, such as escorts and evacuations.
- S.H.I.E.L.D. appears in Marvel: Ultimate Alliance 2.
- The Ultimate Marvel incarnation of S.H.I.E.L.D. appears in Spider-Man: Shattered Dimensions. Carnage launches an attack on the Triskelion and uses a fragment of the Tablet of Order and Chaos to reanimate the S.H.I.E.L.D. agents it kills into zombies.
- S.H.I.E.L.D. appears in Marvel: Avengers Alliance. Outside of Nick Fury, Maria Hill, and Phil Coulson appearing as members, the player controls a S.H.I.E.L.D. agent when fighting villains.
- S.H.I.E.L.D. appears in Marvel Heroes.
- S.H.I.E.L.D. appears in Lego Marvel Super Heroes.
- S.H.I.E.L.D. appears in Disney Infinity: Marvel Super Heroes. Nick Fury is a playable character and S.H.I.E.L.D. directs the player on several missions throughout "The Avengers" and "Spider-Man" playsets.
- S.H.I.E.L.D. makes a minor appearance in Lego Marvel Super Heroes 2, due to most of the game taking place in Chronopolis and Kang the Conqueror vaporizing the Helicarrier upon his arrival.
- S.H.I.E.L.D. appears in Marvel Strike Force.
- S.H.I.E.L.D. appears in Iron Man VR. They used to buy weapons from Stark Industries, including the Helicarrier, before Tony Stark became Iron Man and announced that his company would stop manufacturing weapons. During the game, S.H.I.E.L.D. joins forces with Iron Man to thwart Ghost's attack on the Helicarrier.
- S.H.I.E.L.D. appears in Marvel's Avengers. Following the "A-Day" tragedy, the organization is forced to go underground and surrender most of its resources to A.I.M. The S.H.I.E.L.D. remnants are commanded by Maria Hill, as Nick Fury disappeared without trace after the aforementioned events, though not before he hid copies of resources and protocols to enable the organization to rebuild itself when the right time came. After the Avengers defeat MODOK, S.H.I.E.L.D. is apparently restored and partners with the Avengers to take down A.I.M.

=== Miscellaneous ===
- S.H.I.E.L.D. appears in the Marvel Universe LIVE! stage show.

== See also ==
- List of government agencies in Marvel Comics
- A.R.G.U.S., similar governmental organization from the DC Universe which is also concerned with superhero/supervillain-related matters
