= Agent Carter: S.H.I.E.L.D. 50th Anniversary =

2015 comic book one-shot

Publication information
- Publisher: Marvel Comics
- Genre: Spy, superhero
- Publication date: 2015
- No. of issues: 1
- Main character: Peggy Carter

Creative team
- Written by: Kathryn Immonen
- Artist: Rich Ellis
- Penciller: Rich Ellis
- Letterer: Joe Sabino
- Colorist: Rachelle Rosenberg

Agent Carter: S.H.I.E.L.D. 50th Anniversary is a comic book one-shot published by Marvel Comics in 2015 as part of a series of one-shots to celebrate the fiftieth anniversary of the creation of the fictional intelligence agency S.H.I.E.L.D.

== Publication history ==
The one-shot was published in 2015 to celebrate the 50th anniversary of the fictional organisation S.H.I.E.L.D., together with Fury: S.H.I.E.L.D. 50th Anniversary, The Cavalry: S.H.I.E.L.D. 50th Anniversary, Mockingbird: S.H.I.E.L.D. 50th Anniversary and Quake: S.H.I.E.L.D. 50th Anniversary.

== Plot ==
As Dum Dum Dugan attempts to recruit Peggy Carter into S.H.I.E.L.D. they run into Lady Sif.

== Reception ==
Jesse Schedeen of IGN expressed that the idea of teaming up Peggy Carter with Lady Sif is an appealing concept but that unfortunately, the issue doesn't end up using the novel team-up to very good effect. Doug Zawisza of CBR.com stated that while the one-shot is a decent tale the art is where it struggles, mostly from a storytelling perspective. He says that the artist, Ellis relies on action lines to tell the tale rather than the characters themselves and that the decision to keep the beret, necklace and earrings on Carter undermines the severity of the plot.

== See also ==
- 2015 in comics
