= List of fictional espionage organizations =

Fictional espionage organizations with fancy-sounding acronyms are a common theme in spy fiction. Such acronyms are similarly also common in superhero fiction and science fiction.

== Overview ==
During the 1960s trend for action-adventure spy thrillers, it was a common practice for fictional spy organizations or their nemeses to employ names that were contrived acronyms. Sometimes these acronyms' expanded meanings made sense, but most of the time they were words incongruously crammed together for the mere purpose of obtaining a catchy acronym, traditionally a heroic sounding one for the good guys and an appropriately menacing one for the bad guys. This has become one of the most commonly parodied clichés of the spy thriller genre. They were presumably inspired by SMERSH, which appeared in the James Bond stories and sounded fictional, but really was a branch of Soviet intelligence. These acronyms are often spelled with periods/points/stops to make it clear that they stand for longer terms and are not simply the usual English words that they resemble, even though the punctuation would otherwise seem to indicate that the abbreviations should be pronounced as the names of the individual letters.

== List ==
Among the most popular:

- A.I.M. (Advanced Idea Mechanics), a fictional Marvel Comics terrorist organization, whose members are memorable for wearing yellow Hazmat or radiation suits as uniforms, which make them resemble an army of beekeepers.
- A.R.M.O.R. (Alternate Reality Monitoring and Operational Responses), a fictional branch of SHIELD in Marvel Comics founded to keep an eye on parallel universes.
- A.P.O. (Authorized Personnel Only), a fictional black-ops division of the CIA on the television series ALIAS
- C.O.B.R.A. (Criminal Organization of Bloodiness, Revenge and Assassination), an international terrorist organization, headed by Cobra Commander, from the G.I. Joe series.
- CONTROL, the fictional government agency in the TV Show Get Smart.
- C.O.P.S. (Central Organization of Police Specialists), the crime-fighting organization from the 1988 animated TV series of the same name.
- F.E.A.R. (First Encounter Assault Recon), in the horror-themed first-person-shooter computer game of the same name.
- F.O.W.L. (Fiendish Organization for World Larceny), in cartoon series Darkwing Duck. This organization originated in the DuckTales episode "Double-o-Duck", but was called the Foreign Organization there. In the new DuckTales F.O.W.L. served as the main overarching antagonists.
- H.A.R.M. from the No One Lives Forever (NOLF) series of computer games, which were released in the 1990s, but were based in 1960s pop culture. What H.A.R.M. actually stands for is never revealed, and speculation about its true meaning is the subject of several jokes in both games. (However, in the 1966 spy film Agent for H.A.R.M., it stands for Human Aetiological Relations Machine.)
- H.I.V.E. (Hierarchy of International Vengeance and Extermination), a villainous organization that combats the Teen Titans and other DC Comics superheroes.
- HYDRA is an exception in that the name is not an acronym but rather a reference to the mythical Lernaean Hydra; the name's capitalization exists per Marvel's official spelling only.
- I.M.F. (Impossible Mission Force) from the Mission Impossible series. In the movies the IMF is depicted as a highly-classified sister agency to the CIA working under the authority of the Director of the CIA.
- K-Directorate - Soviet criminal organization made up of former KGB operatives from the television series ALIAS
- M.A.S.K. (Mobile Armored Strike Kommand), the good mask-wearing cohort from the 1980s Saturday-morning cartoon M.A.S.K.
- N.I.D. (National Intelligence Department) from Stargate SG-1.
- N.R.A.G. (National Research Assay Group), created for The Bourne Legacy, the 4th movie in the Jason Bourne series. While not an intelligence agency by standards, N.R.A.G. is a research and development agency, subordinated under the Department of Defense, who lead projects and partnerships to aid intelligence and national security efforts.
- SD-6 - (Section Disparu) branch of the criminal organization known as the Alliance of Twelve from the television series ALIAS.
- S.H.A.D.O. (Supreme Headquarters Alien Defense Organization) in the Gerry Anderson television series UFO.
- S.H.I.E.L.D. (originally Supreme Headquarters, International Espionage, Law Enforcement Division; later Strategic Hazard Intervention, Espionage and Logistics Directorate and Strategic Homeland Intervention, Enforcement and Logistics Division) from the Nick Fury, Agent of S.H.I.E.L.D. Marvel Comics.
- S.H.U.S.H. from Darkwing Duck and new DuckTales.
- SPECTRE (Special Executive for Counter-intelligence, Terrorism, Revenge, and Extortion) from the James Bond series.
- S.P.I.D.E.R. (Secret People's International Directorate for Extralegal Revenue), the adversaries of the T.H.U.N.D.E.R. Agents from Tower Comics (see below).
- S.T.A.R.S. (Special Tactics And Rescue Service) from the Resident Evil video game series.
- S.T.R.I.K.E. (Special Tactical Reserve for International Key Emergencies), a fictional counter-terrorism and intelligence agency in the Marvel Comics Universe (S.T.R.I.K.E. is the United Kingdom's version of S.H.I.E.L.D. and first appeared in Captain Britain Weekly #17).
- S.W.O.R.D. (Sentient World Observation and Response Department) from Marvel Comics.
- T.H.U.N.D.E.R. (The Higher United Nations Defense Enforcement Reserves) from Tower Comics.
- U.N.C.L.E. (United Network Command for Law and Enforcement) and T.H.R.U.S.H. from The Man from U.N.C.L.E.. (The meaning of T.H.R.U.S.H. was never revealed on the series; but, in the novelizations it was stated to be "Technological Hierarchy for the Removal of Undesirables and the Subjugation of Humanity".)
- T.I.A. (Técnicos de Investigación Aeroterráquea; in English Aeroterrestrial Investigation Technicians), a secret spy agency from Spanish comic series Mort & Phil (Spanish: Mortadelo y Filemón)
- U.N.I.T. (United Nations Intelligence Taskforce), a military organization formed to investigate and combat paranormal and extraterrestrial threats to the Earth in the series Doctor Who. UNIT was rebranded as the UNified Intelligence Taskforce in 2008, after the United Nations expressed its discomfort with being associated with a fictional paramilitary organization.
- V.E.N.O.M. (The Vicious, Evil Network Of Mayhem), the evil mask-wearing cohort from the 1980s Saturday-morning cartoon M.A.S.K.
- V.F.D. (Volunteer Fire Department), a secret organization from the book series A Series of Unfortunate Events and its adaptations.
- V.I.L.E. (The Villains' International League of Evil), Carmen Sandiego's band of international thieves.
- W.O.O.H.P. (World Organization of Human Protection), the fictional organization from Totally Spies!, an animated series on Cartoon Network.

Various fiction invent British spy agencies with "MI numbers" other than the well-known MI5 or MI6. Examples include MI7 in Johnny English, M.I.9 in M.I. High, and MI-13 in Marvel Comics. These agencies generally have no relation to the real but defunct branches of the Directorate of Military Intelligence that previously used these designations.

== See also ==
- Emergency service
- List of intelligence agencies
- List of intelligence agencies of the United Kingdom
- List of fictional secret police and intelligence organizations
- List of police television dramas
- NYPD list of fictional portrayals
- Royal Canadian Mounted Police # Popular awareness
