= List of secret police organizations =

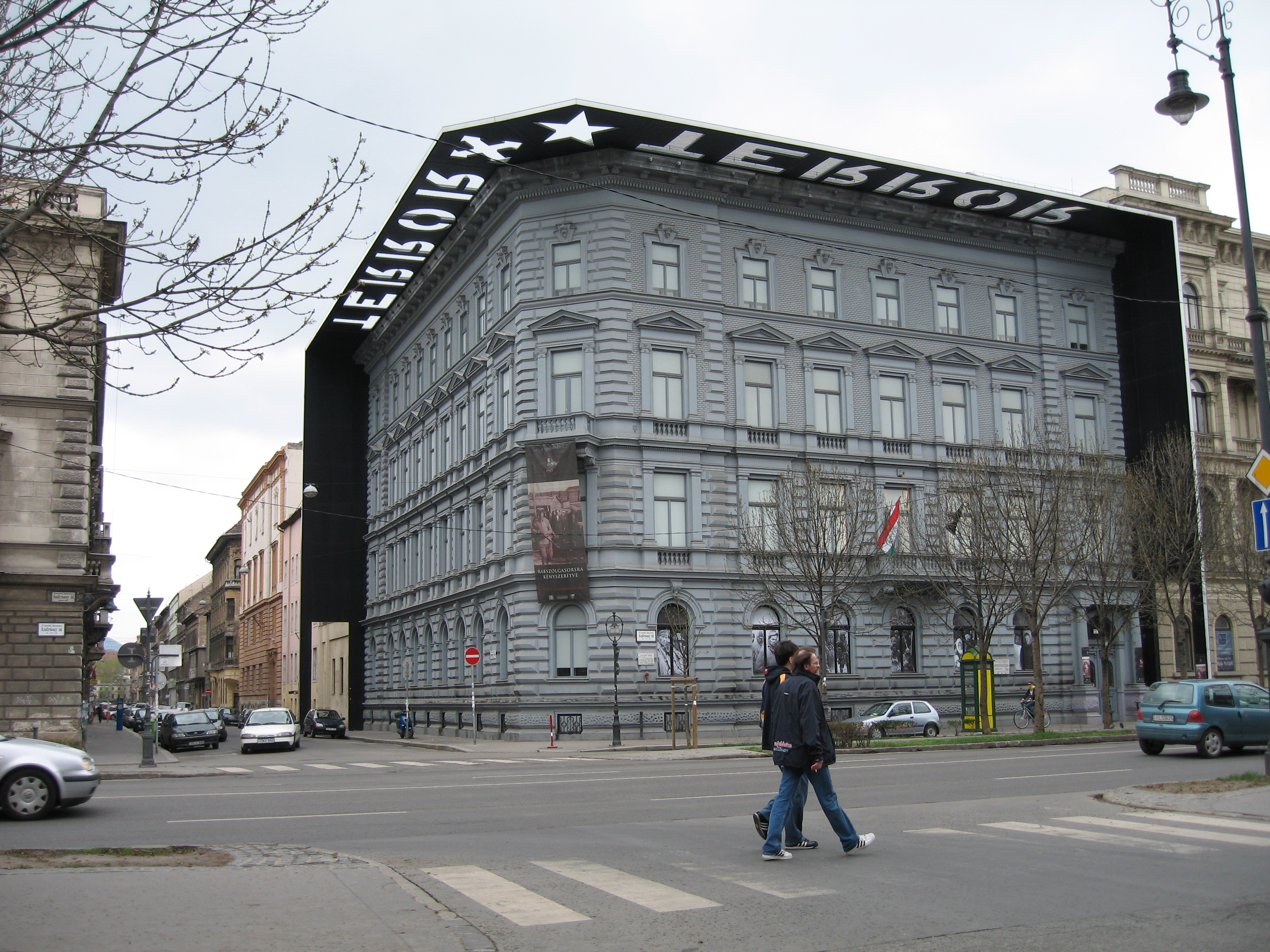
Hungarian Secret Police HQ — now the House of Terror museum

This is a list of current secret police organizations. Fictional secret police organizations and historical secret police organizations are listed on their own respective pages.

In this list, reputable sources, with relevant quotes, assert that the organizations in this list are secret police.

== Agencies by country ==
| Country | Organisation(s) |
|---|---|
| Afghanistan | General Directorate of Intelligence |
| Azerbaijan | State Security Service (DTX) |
| Bahrain | National Security Agency (BIA1) |
| Belarus | State Security Committee (KDB or KGB) |
| Brunei | Internal Security Department (JKDN) |
| China | Ministry of State Security |
| Egypt | General Intelligence Service; National Security Sector |
| Ethiopia | Koree Nageenyaa (Security Committee) |
| Iran | Ministry of Intelligence (formerly SAVAMA) |
| Jordan | General Intelligence Department |
| Kazakhstan | National Security Committee |
| Kyrgyzstan | State Committee for National Security (UKMK) |
| Nigeria | State Security Service |
| North Korea | National Intelligence Agency (until 2026 the Ministry of State Security) |
| Russia | Federal Security Service (FSB) |
| Saudi Arabia | Mabahith (General Directorate of Investigations) |
| Sudan | General Intelligence Service |
| Tajikistan | State Committee of National Security |
| Turkmenistan | Ministry for National Security |
| Ukraine | Security Service of Ukraine (SBU) |
| Uzbekistan | State Security Service (DXX or SGB; until 2018 the National Security Service, SNB) |
| Venezuela | Bolivarian National Intelligence Service (SEBIN) |
| Zimbabwe | Central Intelligence Organisation |

== See also ==
- Intelligence agency
- Mass surveillance
- Mukhabarat
- Secret service
- Surveillance

Lists:

- List of fictional secret police organizations
- List of historical secret police organizations
- List of intelligence agencies
- List of law enforcement agencies
- List of protective service agencies
