= Contract J.A.C.K. =

2003 video game

- Developer: Monolith Productions
- Publishers: Vivendi Universal Games; Sierra Entertainment
- Producer: Ellen Beeman
- Designer: Craig Hubbard
- Programmer: Kevin Stephens
- Artists: David Longo; Wes Saulsberry
- Platform: Microsoft Windows
- Release: NA: November 11, 2003; EU: November 21, 2003
- Genre: First-person shooter
- Modes: Single-player, multiplayer

Contract J.A.C.K. is a 2003 first-person shooter video game and the prequel to No One Lives Forever 2: A Spy in H.A.R.M.'s Way. It was developed by Monolith Productions and published by Vivendi Universal Games and its subsidiary Sierra Entertainment. J.A.C.K. ("Just Another Contract Killer") is set in the time frame between the events of the original The Operative: No One Lives Forever and its sequel, No One Lives Forever 2.

== Story ==
The game follows John Jack, a professional killer recruited by H.A.R.M., a criminal organization central to the No One Lives Forever series. Contract J.A.C.K. is set between No One Lives Forever and No One Lives Forever 2. The game does not involve UNITY, the organization for which Cate Archer works and that opposed H.A.R.M. in the other two games. Rather, J.A.C.K. pits H.A.R.M. against a rival criminal organization, Danger Danger.

After a night of heavy drinking, Jack is apprehended by thugs, who are ordered to kill him. Before they can, he breaks free from the ropes that tied him to a chair and slaughters the thugs that swarm the building. Before he can leave, he receives a phone call from Dimitrij Volkov, H.A.R.M.'s Director of Executive Action. Volkov tells Jack to report to a job interview at the Roman ruins on Malta. The interview consists of Jack mowing down waves of H.A.R.M. troopers as Volkov taunts them over a loudspeaker. In the end, Jack is hired by H.A.R.M.

For his first assignment, Jack must infiltrate a Czechoslovak military base to figure out why Danger Danger is interested in it. Upon delving deeper into the base, Jack becomes aware that the facility is a secret rocket launch site. Danger Danger is trying to use a Czech rocket to recover Dr. Harij, a H.A.R.M. scientist stranded on the Moon after the destruction of H.A.R.M.'s space station in No One Lives Forever. Although Danger Danger is able to launch a rocket full of their men, Jack commandeers a second rocket and heads to the Moon after them.

On the Moon, Jack must fight through Danger Danger goons to get to Dr. Harij. Danger Danger reaches the scientist first, and they begin destroying the lunar base to prevent Jack from escaping. Jack reaches Danger Danger's rocket seconds before it lifts-off. The effects of the rocket's propulsion and the base's explosion send Jack floating through space on a collision course with the Sun. Il Pazzo (Italian for "The Crazy One"), leader of Danger Danger, begins dispatching men to kill Jack, but he fails, and Jack floats to the other rocket, which had been floating among the debris of the base.

Jack crashes his rocket into the Italian countryside of Tuscany. Il Pazzo is nearby with Dr. Harij, and he flees on a gondola. Jack steals a machine gun-equipped Vespa and pursues them while crossing the city of Florence. After killing hordes of Il Pazzo's men, Jack arrives at a castle where Il Pazzo is holed up with Dr. Harij. Using cannons positioned around the building, Jack kills the defenders. A long-distance battle then ensues between Jack and Il Pazzo. Jack wins, but is not able to kill Il Pazzo completely. After rescuing Dr. Harij, Jack is shot by Volkov and left to die. The game ends with Jack rising up and limping toward Volkov's skis. It is believed that the ending implied why Volkov was using a wheelchair and covered in a full-body plaster cast in No One Lives Forever 2.

== Reception ==
Reception

Aggregate score
Aggregator	Score
Metacritic	56/100

Review scores
Publication	Score
4Players	68%
Computer Games Magazine	2/5
Computer Gaming World	2/5
Game Informer	5.5/10
GameSpot	5.9/10
GameSpy	3/5
GameZone	6.3/10
IGN	6.1/10
Jeuxvideo.com	13/20
Joystick	6/10
PC Gamer (US)	63%

The game received mixed reviews according to the review aggregation website Metacritic.
