= Espionage organizations =

Espionage is a subset of human intelligence, one of many intelligence collection methods, which are organized by intelligence collection management.

This lists is restricted to organizations that operate clandestine human sources in foreign countries and non-national groups. It does not include police organizations with domestic informers, or, on an international basis, human sources that do counterintelligence work alone.

| Country | Espionage organizations and agencies |
|---|---|
| Argentina | Secretariat of Intelligence, National Directorate of Criminal Intelligence, National Directorate of Strategic Military Intelligence |
| Australia | Australian Secret Intelligence Service |
| Cuba | General Intelligence Directorate (DGI) |
| Czech Republic | Security Information Service |
| France | General Directorate of External Security, Central Directorate of General Intelligence, |
| Germany | Federal Intelligence Service |
| India | Research and Analysis Wing, Intelligence Bureau |
| Iran | Ministry of Intelligence (Iran) |
| Israel | Institute for Intelligence and Special Operations |
| Italy | Democratic Intelligence and Security Service, Military Intelligence and Security Service |
| Mexico | National Security and Investigation Center |
| Pakistan | Directorate for Inter-Services Intelligence |
| Netherlands | General Intelligence and Security Service |
| New Zealand | New Zealand Security Intelligence Service |
| Russia | Federal Security Service, Foreign Intelligence Service, Main Intelligence Directorate |
| South Africa | National Intelligence Agency, South African Secret Service, South African National Defence Force Intelligence Division |
| Spain | National Intelligence Centre |
| United Kingdom | Secret Intelligence Service |
| United States | Central Intelligence Agency Directorate of Operations, Defense Intelligence Agency Defense Clandestine Service |
