= Jason Aaron =

American comic book writer (born 1973)

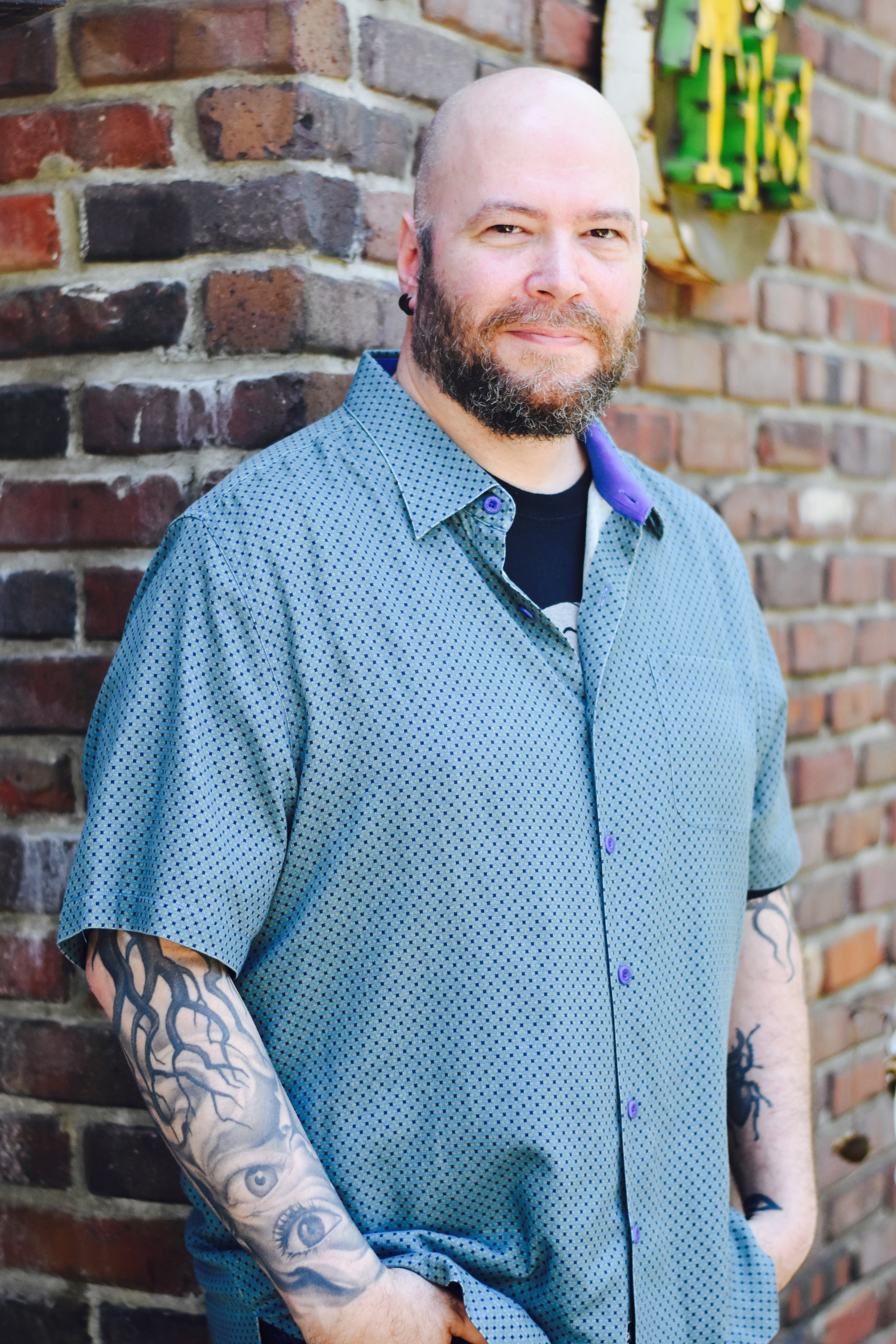
- Aaron in 2017
- Born: January 28, 1973 (age 53) Jasper, Alabama, U.S.
- Area: Writer
- Notable works: The Other Side; Scalped; Ghost Rider; Wolverine: Weapon X PunisherMAX; Wolverine and the X-Men; Thor: God of Thunder; Original Sin; Southern Bastards; The Mighty Thor; Star Wars; Doctor Strange; The Avengers; Conan the Barbarian; Absolute Superman
- Awards: Inkpot Award 2016

Jason Aaron (born January 28, 1973) is an American comic book writer, known for his creator-owned series Scalped and Southern Bastards; his work on Marvel series Ghost Rider, Wolverine, PunisherMAX, Thor and The Avengers; as well as his work for DC Comics on Absolute Superman. In 2019 he wrote the eponymous central miniseries of the Marvel company-wide crossover storyline "The War of the Realms". As part of his Marvel work, he co-created the character Gorr the God Butcher and introduced the concept of Jane Foster becoming Thor in the main Marvel Universe.

The film Thor: Love and Thunder was based on and influenced by his work on Thor.

== Early life ==
Jason Aaron was born in Jasper, Alabama. His cousin, Gustav Hasford, who wrote the semi-autobiographical novel The Short-Timers (1979), on which the feature film Full Metal Jacket (1987) was based, was a large influence on Aaron. Aaron decided he wanted to write comics as a child, and though his father was skeptical when Aaron informed him of this aspiration, his mother took Aaron to drug stores, where he would purchase comic books from spinner racks, some of which he still owned as of 2012.

Aaron graduated from Shelby County High School. He then attended the University of Alabama at Birmingham, where he graduated with a Bachelor of Arts in English.

== Career ==
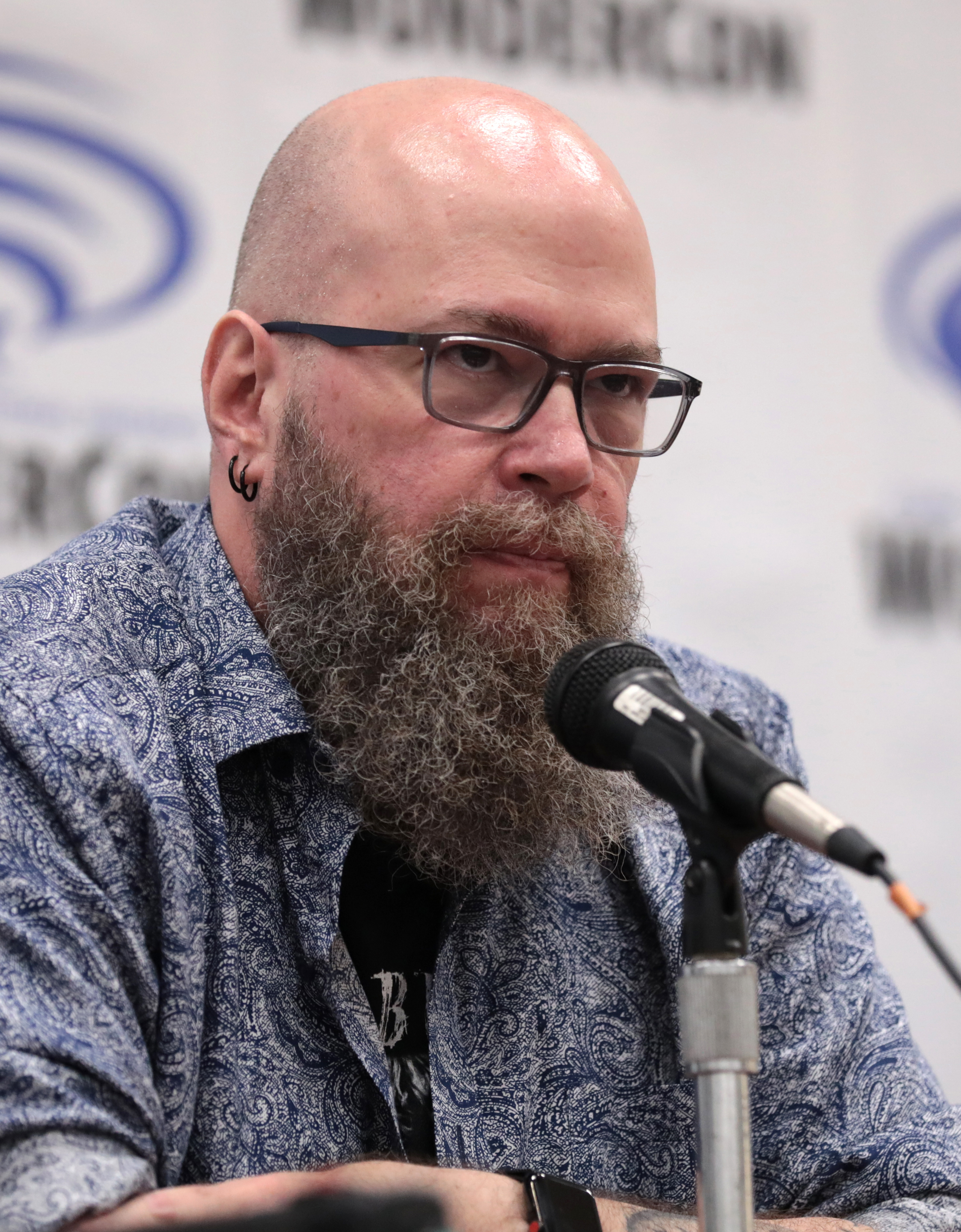
Aaron at the 2023 WonderCon

Aaron's career in comics began in 2001 when he won a Marvel Comics talent search contest with an eight-page Wolverine story script. The story, which was published in Wolverine #175 (June 2002), gave him the opportunity to pitch subsequent ideas to editors. In 2006, Aaron made a blind submission to DC Comics's imprint Vertigo, which became his first major work, the Vietnam War story The Other Side. The Other Side was nominated for an Eisner Award for Best Miniseries, and Aaron regards it as the "second time" he broke into the industry. Following this, Vertigo asked him to pitch other ideas, which led to Scalped, a creator-owned series with artist R. M. Guéra set on the fictional Prairie Rose Indian Reservation.

In 2007, Aaron wrote Ripclaw: Pilot Season for Top Cow Productions. Later that year, Marvel editor Axel Alonso, who was impressed by The Other Side and Scalped, hired Aaron to write issues of Wolverine, Black Panther and eventually, an extended run on Ghost Rider that began in April 2008. In January 2008, he signed an exclusive contract with Marvel, though it would not affect his work on Scalped. In July of that year, he wrote the Penguin issue of Joker's Asylum.

After a four-issue stint on Wolverine in 2007, Aaron returned to the character with the ongoing series Wolverine: Weapon X, launched to coincide with the feature film X-Men Origins: Wolverine. Aaron commented, "With Wolverine: Weapon X we'll be trying to mix things up like that from arc to arc, so the first arc is a typical sort of black ops story but the second arc will jump right into the middle of a completely different genre." In 2010, the series was relaunched once again as simply Wolverine. He followed this with the relaunch of The Incredible Hulk in 2011 and Thor: God of Thunder in 2012. Aaron and artist Mike Deodato collaborated on the Original Sin limited series in 2014. In 2018, Aaron relaunched Thor with Mike del Mundo and The Avengers with Ed McGuinness. In addition to his work on Marvel characters, Aaron wrote a year-long run on the Conan the Barbarian series after Marvel regained the licensing rights to the character in 2019.

At the 2019 San Diego Comic Con, it was announced that Aaron's Thor storyline which depicted Jane Foster acquiring the mantle of the Thunder God would be the basis for the 2022 film Thor: Love and Thunder.

In 2022, Aaron would write a new creator-owned book at Boom! Studios entitled Once Upon a Time at the End of the World. The 15 issue series began publication in November that same year with three artists, Alexandre Tefenkgi, Leila del Duca, and Nick Dragotta, being employed every 5 issues to highlight the passage of time.

In March 2023, Aaron announced that he was no longer under exclusive contract with Marvel. In August 2023, it was announced that Aaron would be writing a project for DC called Batman: Off-World, a six-issue limited series drawn by artist Doug Mahnke and inker Jamie Mendoza. The series would focus on a young Batman's first adventure in space. In October 2023, it was announced that Aaron's next DC project would be a three-issue story arc on Action Comics focusing on the character Bizarro to be drawn by artist John Timms. The story arc is part of a new Action Comics initiative called "Superman Superstars" where rotating creative teams of writers and artists write short story arcs focusing on Superman and his villains. Aaron's arc will start on Action Comics #1061 in January 2024 and end in March 2024 with Action Comics #1063.

In June 2024, Marvel published a one-shot story, written by Aaron in collaboration with other artists, featuring Disney's Uncle Scrooge character for the first time ever in a Marvel comic book. The story, named Uncle Scrooge and the Infinity Dime, introduced Scrooge and the Duck Universe to the Marvel Multiverse concept. 2025 saw the birth of the four issue Uncle Scrooge: Earths Mightiest Duck, also published by Marvel.

== Personal life ==
Aaron moved to Kansas City, Kansas in 2000, the day after the first X-Men feature film was released.

Aaron is a passionate and well known fan of the Alabama Crimson Tide football team.

Commenting on the religious themes that run through his work, Aaron says he was raised Southern Baptist, but has since renounced religion:

I've been an atheist for many years, but I've remained fascinated by religion. If anything, I've become more fascinated by religion and faith after I lost mine."

== Awards and nominations ==
- Nominated: 2007 Eisner Award for Best Miniseries for The Other Side.
- Nominated: 2015 Eisner Award for Best Writer for Southern Bastards, Original Sin, Thor: God of Thunder and Men of Wrath.
- Nominated: 2015 Eisner Award for Best Continuing Series for Southern Bastards.
- Recipient: 2015 Harvey Award for Best New Series for Southern Bastards.
- Nominated: 2015 Harvey Award for Best Writer for Southern Bastards.
- Recipient: 2016 Eisner Award for Best Continuing Series for Southern Bastards.
- Recipient: 2016 Eisner Award for Best Writer for Southern Bastards, Star Wars, Doctor Strange, Thor and Men of Wrath.
- Recipient: 2016 Inkpot Award

== Bibliography ==
=== DC Comics ===
- The Other Side #1–5 (with Cameron Stewart, Vertigo, 2006) collected as The Other Side (tpb, 144 pages, 2007, ISBN 1-4012-1350-2; hc, Image, 2017, ISBN 1-5343-0222-0)
- Scalped (with R. M. Guéra, John Paul Leon (#12), Davide Furnò (#18–20, 36–37, 44), Francesco Francavilla (#27), Danijel Žeželj (#35) and Jason Latour (#43), Vertigo, 2007–2012) collected as:
  - Book One (collects #1–11, hc, 296 pages, 2015, ISBN 1-4012-5091-2; tpb, 2017, ISBN 1-4012-7126-X)
  - Book Two (collects #12–24, hc, 320 pages, 2015, ISBN 1-4012-5425-X; tpb, 2018, ISBN 1-4012-7786-1)
  - Book Three (collects #25–36, hc, 256 pages, 2015, ISBN 1-4012-5858-1; tpb, 2018, ISBN 1-4012-8156-7)
  - Book Four (collects #37–49, hc, 352 pages, 2016, ISBN 1-4012-6144-2; tpb, cancelled, ISBN 1-4012-8539-2)
  - Book Five (collects #50–60, hc, 128 pages, 2016, ISBN 1-4012-6363-1; tpb, cancelled, ISBN 1-4012-8848-0)
- Friday the 13th: How I Spent My Summer Vacation #1–2 (with Adam Archer, Wildstorm, 2007) collected in Friday the 13th: Book Two (tpb, 160 pages, 2008, ISBN 1-4012-2003-7)
- Hellblazer #245–246: "Newcastle Calling" (with Sean Gordon Murphy, Vertigo, 2008) collected in John Constantine, Hellblazer Volume 21 (tpb, 352 pages, 2019, ISBN 1-4012-9212-7)
- Joker's Asylum: Penguin (with Jason Pearson, one-shot, 2008) collected in Joker's Asylum Volume 1 (tpb, 128 pages, 2008, ISBN 1-4012-1955-1)
- American Vampire Anthology #1: "Lost Colony" (with Declan Shalvey, Vertigo, 2013)
  - Collected in American Vampire Volume 6 (hc, 144 pages, 2014, ISBN 1-4012-4708-3; tpb, 2014, ISBN 1-4012-4929-9)
  - Collected in American Vampire Omnibus Volume 2 (hc, 928 pages, DC Black Label, 2022, ISBN 1-77951-688-6)
- Batman: Off World #1–6 (with Doug Mahnke, 2023–2024)
- Action Comics #1061–1063 "I, Bizarro" (with John Timms, 2024)
- Absolute Superman #1–present (with Rafa Sandoval, 2024– )

=== Marvel Comics ===
- X-Men:
  - Wolverine by Jason Aaron: The Complete Collection Volume 1 (tpb, 392 pages, 2013, ISBN 0-7851-8541-0) includes:
    - Wolverine vol. 2 #175: "A Good Man" (with UDON Studios, Aaron's first published work — a co-feature, 2002)
    - Wolverine vol. 3:
      - "The Man in the Pit" (with Howard Chaykin, in #56, 2007)
      - "Get Mystique!" (with Ron Garney, in #62–65, 2008)
      - "A Mile in My Moccasins" (with Adam Kubert, in #73–74, 2009)
    - Wolverine: Manifest Destiny #1–4 (with Stephen Segovia, 2008–2009)
  - Wolverine: Weapon X (with Ron Garney, Yanick Paquette (#6–9), C. P. Smith (#10) and Davide Gianfelice (#16), 2009–2010) collected as:
    - Wolverine by Jason Aaron: The Complete Collection Volume 1 (includes #1–5, tpb, 392 pages, 2013, ISBN 0-7851-8541-0)
    - Wolverine by Jason Aaron: The Complete Collection Volume 2 (collects #6–16, tpb, 320 pages, 2014, ISBN 0-7851-8576-3)
      - Includes the Dark Reign: The List—Wolverine one-shot (written by Aaron, art by Esad Ribić, 2009)
      - Includes the "Get Mystique (Slight Return)" short story (art by Jock) from Dark X-Men: The Beginning #3 (anthology, 2009)
    - Wolverine by Jason Aaron Omnibus (collects #1–16, Wolverine vol. 3 issues, Wolverine: Manifest Destiny and all the one-shots and short stories, hc, 688 pages, 2011, ISBN 0-7851-5639-9)
  - Wolverine vol. 4 (with Renato Guedes, Jefte Palo (#5.1), Daniel Acuña (#6–9), Goran Sudžuka (#15–16), Ron Garney (#17–19) and Steven Sanders + Billy Tan (#300–304), 2010–2012) collected as:
    - Wolverine by Jason Aaron: The Complete Collection Volume 3 (collects #1–9 and 5.1, tpb, 456 pages, 2014, ISBN 0-7851-8908-4)
      - Includes the "Falling" short story (art by Renato Guedes) from Wolverine: Road to Hell (promotional one-shot, 2010)
      - Includes the 6-issue spin-off limited series Astonishing Spider-Man & Wolverine (written by Aaron, art by Adam Kubert, 2010–2011)
    - Wolverine by Jason Aaron: The Complete Collection Volume 4 (collects #10–20 and 300–304, tpb, 408 pages, 2014, ISBN 0-7851-8909-2)
    - Wolverine Goes to Hell Omnibus (collects #1–20, 5.1, 300–304, Astonishing Spider-Man & Wolverine and the short story from Wolverine: Road to Hell, hc, 984 pages, 2018, ISBN 1-302-91159-7)
  - X-Force Special: Ain't No Dog: "Hunters and Killers" (with Werther Dell'Edera, co-feature in one-shot, 2008) collected in X-Force by Craig Kyle and Chris Yost Volume 1 (tpb, 384 pages, 2014, ISBN 0-7851-8966-1)
  - X-Men: Schism #1–5 (with Carlos Pacheco, Frank Cho, Daniel Acuña, Alan Davis and Adam Kubert, 2011) collected as X-Men: Schism (hc, 168 pages, 2012, ISBN 0-7851-5668-2; tpb, 2012, ISBN 1-84653-502-6)
  - Wolverine and the X-Men (with Chris Bachalo, Nick Bradshaw, Jorge Molina, Mike Allred (#17), Steven Sanders (#20), David López (#24), Ramón K. Pérez, Giuseppe Camuncoli (#36–37) and Pepe Larraz, 2011–2014) collected as:
    - Volume 1 (collects #1–4, hc, 112 pages, 2012, ISBN 0-7851-5679-8; tpb, 2012, ISBN 0-7851-5680-1)
    - Volume 2 (collects #5–8, hc, 104 pages, 2012, ISBN 0-7851-5681-X; tpb, 2013, ISBN 0-7851-5682-8)
    - Volume 3 (collects #9–13, hc, 112 pages, 2013, ISBN 0-7851-5999-1; tpb, 2013, ISBN 0-7851-6000-0)
    - Volume 4 (collects #14–18, hc, 128 pages, 2012, ISBN 0-7851-6542-8; tpb, 2013, ISBN 0-7851-6543-6)
    - Volume 5 (collects #19–24, tpb, 136 pages, 2013, ISBN 0-7851-6577-0)
    - Volume 6 (collects #25–29, tpb, 112 pages, 2013, ISBN 0-7851-6599-1)
    - Volume 7 (collects #30–35, tpb, 136 pages, 2014, ISBN 0-7851-6600-9)
    - X-Men: Battle of the Atom (includes #36–37, hc, 248 pages, 2014, ISBN 0-7851-8906-8; tpb, 2014, ISBN 0-7851-8907-6)
      - Also collects X-Men: Battle of the Atom #2 (of 2) (written by Aaron, art by Esad Ribić, Giuseppe Camuncoli and Chris Bachalo, 2013)
    - Volume 8 (collects #38–42 and Annual, tpb, 152 pages, 2014, ISBN 0-7851-6601-7)
    - Wolverine and the X-Men by Jason Aaron Omnibus (collects #1–35, 38–42 and Annual, hc, 936 pages, 2014, ISBN 0-7851-9024-4)
  - Amazing X-Men vol. 2 #1–6 (with Ed McGuinness and Cameron Stewart (#6), 2014) collected as Amazing X-Men: The Quest for Nightcrawler (tpb, 136 pages, 2014, ISBN 0-7851-8821-5)
  - Wolverine: Japan's Most Wanted #1–13 (co-written by Aaron and Jason Latour, art by Paco Diaz and Alé Garza (#8–9), 2014) collected as Wolverine: Japan's Most Wanted (hc, 136 pages, 2014, ISBN 0-7851-8459-7)
- Ghost Rider vol. 5 (with Roland Boschi, Tan Eng Huat and Tony Moore (#33–35), 2008–2009) collected as:
  - The War for Heaven: Book One (collects #20–32, tpb, 392 pages, 2019, ISBN 1-302-91625-4)
  - The War for Heaven: Book Two (includes #33–35, tpb, 336 pages, 2020, ISBN 1-302-92341-2)
    - Also collects the 6-issue spin-off limited series Ghost Riders: Heaven's on Fire (written by Aaron, art by Roland Boschi, 2009–2010)
  - Ghost Rider by Jason Aaron Omnibus (collects #20–35 and Ghost Riders: Heaven's on Fire #1–6, hc, 536 pages, 2010, ISBN 0-7851-4367-X)
- Black Panther vol. 3 #39–41: "See Wakanda and Die" (with Jefte Palo, 2008) collected as Secret Invasion: Black Panther (tpb, 96 pages, 2009, ISBN 0-7851-3397-6)
- American Eagle: Just a Little Old Fashioned Justice (with Richard Isanove, digital one-shot, 2008)
  - First published in print as a feature in Marvel Assistant-Sized Spectacular #1 (anthology, 2009)
  - Collected in Bloodstone and the Legion of Monsters (tpb, 312 pages, 2017, ISBN 1-302-90802-2)
- Punisher:
  - Punisher MAX by Jason Aaron and Steve Dillon Omnibus (hc, 544 pages, 2014, ISBN 0-7851-5429-9) collects:
    - Punisher MAX X-Mas Special (with Roland Boschi, one-shot, 2009) also collected in Punisher MAX: The Complete Collection Volume 6 (tpb, 376 pages, 2017, ISBN 1-302-90739-5)
    - Punisher MAX #1–22 (with Steve Dillon, 2010–2012) also collected as Punisher MAX: The Complete Collection Volume 7 (tpb, 512 pages, 2018, ISBN 1-302-90912-6)
  - The Punisher vol. 13 (with Jesús Saiz and Paul Azaceta, 2022–2023) collected as:
    - The King of Killers Book One (collects #1–6, tpb, 208 pages, 2022, ISBN 1-302-92877-5)
    - The King of Killers Book Two (collects #7–12, tpb, 192 pages, 2023, ISBN 1-302-92878-3)
- Deadpool vol. 2 #900: "Close Encounters of the @*#$ed-Up Kind" (with Chris Staggs, co-feature, 2009) collected in Deadpool: Dead Head Redemption (tpb, 240 pages, 2011, ISBN 0-7851-5649-6)
- Immortal Weapons #1: "The Book of the Cobra" (with Mico Suayan and various artists, 2009) collected in Immortal Iron Fist: The Complete Collection Volume 2 (tpb, 496 pages, 2014, ISBN 0-7851-8890-8)
- Captain America: Who Won't Wield the Shield?: "Forbush Man: Forbush Kills!" (with Mirco Pierfederici, anthology one-shot, 2010) collected in Secret Wars Too (tpb, 208 pages, 2016, ISBN 1-302-90211-3)
- The Avengers vs. Atlas #4: "My Dinner with Gorilla Man" (with Giancarlo Caracuzzo, co-feature, 2010) collected in Gorilla Man (tpb, 144 pages, 2010, ISBN 0-7851-4911-2)
- Ultimate Comics: Captain America #1–4 (with Ron Garney, 2011) collected as Ultimate Comics: Captain America (hc, 112 pages, 2011, ISBN 0-7851-5194-X; tpb, 2011, ISBN 0-7851-5195-8)
- The Incredible Hulk by Jason Aaron: The Complete Collection (tpb, 376 pages, 2017 ISBN 1-302-90792-1) collects:
  - Fear Itself #7: "Epilogue: Saturday" (with Mike Choi, co-feature, 2011)
  - The Incredible Hulk vol. 3 #1–15 (with Marc Silvestri, Whilce Portacio, Jefte Palo, Steve Dillon (#8), Pasqual Ferry (#9), Tom Raney (#10), Dalibor Talajić (#11) and Carlos Pacheco (#12), 2011–2012)
- Avengers vs. X-Men (hc, 568 pages, 2012, ISBN 0-7851-6317-4) includes:
  - Avengers vs. X-Men #0 (Hope story, with Frank Cho) — #2 (with John Romita, Jr.) — #9 (with Adam Kubert) — #12 (with Adam Kubert, 2012) also collected in Avengers vs. X-Men (tpb, 384 pages, 2013, ISBN 0-7851-6318-2)
  - AvX: VS (anthology) also collected in Avengers vs. X-Men: VS (tpb, 160 pages, 2013, ISBN 0-7851-6520-7)
    - "The Invincible Iron Man vs. Magneto" (with Adam Kubert, in #1, 2012)
    - "Angel vs. Hawkeye" (with John Romita, Jr., in #5, 2012)
    - "Iron Fist vs. Iceman" (with Ramón K. Pérez, in #6, 2012)
- BrooklyKnight (with Mike Deodato, Jr., free promotional one-shot, 2013)
- Thor:
  - Thor: God of Thunder (with Esad Ribić, Butch Guice (#6), Nic Klein (#12), Ron Garney, Das Pastoras (#18), Agustín Alessio (#24) and R. M. Guéra + Simon Bisley (#25), 2012–2014) collected as:
    - Thor by Jason Aaron: The Complete Collection Volume 1 (collects #1–18, tpb, 432 pages, 2019, ISBN 1-302-91810-9)
    - Thor by Jason Aaron: The Complete Collection Volume 2 (includes #19–25, tpb, 464 pages, 2020, ISBN 1-302-92386-2)
      - Also collects the 8-issue fourth volume of the Thor ongoing series (written by Aaron, art by Russell Dauterman and Jorge Molina (#5), 2014–2015)
      - Also collects the 4-issue spin-off limited series Secret Wars: Thors (written by Aaron, art by Chris Sprouse and Goran Sudžuka (#2–3), 2015–2016)
  - The Mighty Thor vol. 2 (with Russell Dauterman, Frazer Irving (#12), Steve Epting (#13–14), Valerio Schiti (#19–23) and James Harren (#701), 2016–2018) collected as:
    - Thor by Jason Aaron: The Complete Collection Volume 3 (collects #1–19, tpb, 448 pages, 2021, ISBN 1-302-92387-0)
    - Thor by Jason Aaron: The Complete Collection Volume 4 (includes #20–23 and 700–706, tpb, 464 pages, 2021, ISBN 1-302-92991-7)
      - Also collects the 5-issue spin-off limited series The Unworthy Thor (written by Aaron, art by Olivier Coipel and various artists, 2017)
      - Also collects the Generations: the Mighty Thor and the Unworthy Thor one-shot (written by Aaron, art by Mahmud Asrar, 2017)
      - Also collects The Mighty Thor: At the Gates of Valhalla one-shot (written by Aaron, art by Ramón K. Pérez and Jen Bartel, 2018)
  - Thor by Jason Aaron: The Complete Collection Volume 5 (tpb, 496 pages, 2022, ISBN 1-302-93163-6) collects:
    - Thor vol. 5 #1–16 (with Mike del Mundo, Christian Ward (#5–6), Tony Moore (#7), Lee Garbett (#11) and Scott Hepburn (#14), 2018–2019)
    - King Thor #1–4 (with Esad Ribić and Das Pastoras (#3), 2019–2020)
  - Thor vol. 6 #24: "Who Wields Who?" (with Das Pastoras, co-feature, 2022) collected in Thor: God of Hammers (tpb, 184 pages, 2022, ISBN 1-302-92613-6)
- A+X #3: "Black Panther + Storm" (with Pasqual Ferry, anthology, 2013) collected in A+X = Awesome (tpb, 144 pages, 2013, ISBN 0-7851-6674-2)
- Thanos Rising #1–5 (with Simone Bianchi, 2013) collected as Thanos Rising (hc, 136 pages, 2013, ISBN 0-7851-9047-3; tpb, 2013, ISBN 0-7851-8400-7)
- Original Sin:
  - Original Sin #1–8 (with Mike Deodato, Jr., 2014) collected as Original Sin (hc, 392 pages, 2014, ISBN 0-7851-9069-4; tpb, 240 pages, 2015, ISBN 0-7851-5491-4)
  - Original Sin #5.1–5.5: "Thor and Loki: The Tenth Realm" (co-written by Aaron and Al Ewing, art by Simone Bianchi and Lee Garbett, 2014)
    - Collected as Original Sin: Thor and Loki — The Tenth Realm (tpb, 112 pages, 2014, ISBN 0-7851-9169-0)
    - Collected in Original Sin Companion (hc, 968 pages, 2015, ISBN 0-7851-9212-3)
- Men of Wrath #1–5 (with Ron Garney, Icon, 2014–2015) collected as Men of Wrath (tpb, 144 pages, 2015, ISBN 0-7851-9168-2; hc, Image, 2018, ISBN 1-5343-0859-8)
- Star Wars:
  - Star Wars vol. 4 (with John Cassaday, Simone Bianchi, Stuart Immonen, Mike Deodato, Jr. (#13–14), Mike Mayhew (#15, 20), Leinil Francis Yu, Jorge Molina and Salvador Larroca, 2015–2017) collected as:
    - Volume 1 (collects #1–12, hc, 296 pages, 2016, ISBN 1-302-90098-6)
    - Vader Down (collects #13–14, Star Wars: Darth Vader #13–15 and the Star Wars: Vader Down one-shot, tpb, 152 pages, 2016, ISBN 0-7851-9789-3)
      - All issues of the crossover — Star Wars vol. 4 #13–14, Star Wars: Darth Vader #13–15 and the Star Wars: Vader Down one-shot — are co-written by Aaron and Kieron Gillen.
    - Volume 2 (collects #15–25, hc, 288 pages, 2017, ISBN 1-302-90374-8)
    - Volume 3 (collects #26–30 and 33–37, hc, 256 pages, 2018, ISBN 1-302-90903-7)
    - The Screaming Citadel (includes #31–32, tpb, 152 pages, 2016, ISBN 0-7851-9789-3)
      - Also collects the Star Wars: The Screaming Citadel one-shot (co-written by Aaron and Kieron Gillen, art by Marco Checchetto, 2017)
    - Omnibus (collects #1–37, Star Wars: Darth Vader #13–15, Star Wars: Vader Down and Star Wars: The Screaming Citadel, hc, 1,296 pages, 2019, ISBN 1-302-91537-1)
  - Star Wars: Darth Vader — Black, White and Red #1–4: "Hard Shutdown" (with Leonard Kirk, anthology, 2023) collected in Star Wars: Darth Vader — Black, White and Red (Treasury Edition, 136 pages, 2024, ISBN 1-302-95214-5)
- Secret Wars: Weirdworld #1–5 (with Mike del Mundo, 2015) collected as Weirdworld: Warzones! (tpb, 112 pages, 2015, ISBN 0-7851-9891-1)
- Doctor Strange vol. 4 (with Chris Bachalo, Kevin Nowlan, Leonardo Romero (#11) and Frazer Irving (#17), 2015–2017) collected as:
  - Volume 1 (collects #1–10 and the Doctor Strange: Last Days of Magic one-shot, hc, 280 pages, 2017, ISBN 1-302-90432-9)
  - Volume 2 (collects #11–20, hc, 272 pages, 2018, ISBN 1-302-90897-9)
  - Doctor Strange by Jason Aaron and Chris Bachalo Omnibus (collects #1–20 and the Doctor Strange: Last Days of Magic one-shot, hc, 576 pages, 2022, ISBN 1-302-93348-5)
- Marvel Legacy (with Esad Ribić, Steve McNiven, Chris Samnee, Russell Dauterman, Alex Maleev, Ed McGuinness, Stuart Immonen, Pepe Larraz, Jim Cheung, Daniel Acuña, Greg Land and Mike Deodato, Jr., one-shot, 2017)
- The Avengers:
  - The Avengers vol. 7 (with Ed McGuinness, Paco Medina, Sara Pichelli (#7), David Marquez, Andrea Sorrentino (#13 and 26), Jason Masters (#21), Stefano Caselli, Dale Keown (#26 and 39), Javier Garrón, Luca Maresca (#42 and 45), Flaviano (#49), Aaron Kuder + Carlos Pacheco (#50), Juan Frigeri (#51–54) and Ivan Fiorelli (#61–62), 2018–2023) collected as:
    - The Final Host (collects #1–6 and the Free Comic Book Day 2018: The Avengers/Captain America special, tpb, 160 pages, 2018, ISBN 1-302-91187-2)
    - World Tour (collects #7–12, tpb, 160 pages, 2019, ISBN 1-302-91188-0)
    - War of the Vampires (collects #13–17, tpb, 136 pages, 2019, ISBN 1-302-91461-8)
    - War of the Realms (collects #18–21 and the Free Comic Book Day 2019: The Avengers/Savage Avengers special, tpb, 112 pages, 2019, ISBN 1-302-91462-6)
    - Challenge of the Ghost Riders (collects #22–25, tpb, 112 pages, 2020, ISBN 1-302-92093-6)
    - Starbrand Reborn (collects #26–30, tpb, 136 pages, 2020, ISBN 1-302-92094-4)
    - The Age of Khonshu (collects #31–38, tpb, 184 pages, 2021, ISBN 1-302-92486-9)
    - Enter the Phoenix (collects #39–45, tpb, 168 pages, 2021, ISBN 1-302-92487-7)
    - World War She-Hulk (collects #46–50, tpb, 184 pages, 2022, ISBN 1-302-92488-5)
    - The Death Hunters (collects #51–56 and the Free Comic Book Day 2021: The Avengers/Hulk special, tpb, 176 pages, 2022, ISBN 1-302-92628-4)
      - Includes the Avengers 1,000,000 B.C. one-shot (written by Aaron, art by Kev Walker, 2022)
    - History's Mightiest Heroes (includes #57–59 and 61–62, tpb, 136 pages, 2023, ISBN 1-302-92885-6)
    - Avengers Assemble (includes #63–66, tpb, 288 pages, 2023, ISBN 1-302-95063-0)
      - Includes the Avengers Assemble: Alpha one-shot (written by Aaron, art by Bryan Hitch, 2023)
      - Includes the Avengers Assemble: Omega one-shot (written by Aaron, art by Aaron Kuder, Ivan Fiorelli, Javier Garrón and Jim Towe, 2023)
  - Incoming!: "The Avengers" (with Andrea Sorrentino, anthology one-shot, 2020) collected in Road to Empyre (tpb, 168 pages, 2020, ISBN 1-302-92588-1)
  - Free Comic Book Day 2021: The Avengers/Hulk: "The Tower at the Center of Everything" (with Iban Coello, co-feature in one-shot, 2021)
  - Avengers Forever vol. 2 (with Aaron Kuder, Carlos Magno (#2) and Jim Towe (#4–6, 10–11, 14), 2022–2023) collected as:
    - The Lords of Earthly Vengeance (collects #1–5, tpb, 128 pages, 2022, ISBN 1-302-93260-8)
    - The Pillars (collects #6–11, tpb, 192 pages, 2023, ISBN 1-302-93261-6)
      - Includes the digital-only 4-issue limited series Infinity Comics: Avengers Forever (written by Aaron, art by Kev Walker, 2022)
    - Avengers Assemble (includes #12–15, tpb, 288 pages, 2023, ISBN 1-302-95063-0)
- Conan the Barbarian:
  - Conan the Barbarian vol. 4 #1–12 (with Mahmud Asrar and Gerardo Zaffino (#4 and 8), 2019–2020) collected as Conan the Barbarian by Jason Aaron and Mahmud Asrar (hc, 296 pages, 2021, ISBN 1-302-92652-7)
  - King Conan #1–6 (with Mahmud Asrar, 2022) collected as King Conan (tpb, 144 pages, 2022, ISBN 1-302-93055-9)
- War of the Realms Omnibus (hc, 1,576 pages, 2020, ISBN 1-302-92641-1) includes:
  - War of the Realms #1–6 (with Russell Dauterman, 2019) also collected as War of the Realms (tpb, 192 pages, 2019, ISBN 1-302-91469-3)
  - War of the Realms: War Scrolls #1–3: "The God without Fear" (with Andrea Sorrentino, anthology, 2019) also collected in War of the Realms: Spider-Man/Daredevil (tpb, 112 pages, 2019, ISBN 1-302-91928-8)
  - War of the Realms: Omega: "God and the Devil Walk into a Church" (with Ron Garney, framing sequence in anthology one-shot, 2019)
- Valkyrie:
  - Jane Foster: Valkyrie (co-written by Aaron with Al Ewing (#1–7) and Torunn Grønbekk (#8–10), art by CAFU, Pere Pérez (#6–7) and Ramon Rosanas (#9–10), 2019–2020) collected as:
    - The Sacred and the Profane (collects #1–5 and the short prologue from the War of the Realms: Omega one-shot, tpb, 128 pages, 2020, ISBN 1-302-92029-4)
    - At the End of All Things (collects #6–10, tpb, 112 pages, 2020, ISBN 1-302-92030-8)
  - King in Black: Return of the Valkyries #1–4 (co-written by Aaron and Torunn Grønbekk, art by Nina Vakueva, 2021) collected as King in Black: Return of the Valkyries (tpb, 112 pages, 2021, ISBN 1-302-92808-2)
  - The Mighty Valkyries #1–5 (co-written by Aaron and Torunn Grønbekk, art by Mattia de Iulis, 2021) collected as The Mighty Valkyries: All Hell Let Loose (tpb, 120 pages, 2021, ISBN 1-302-93019-2)
- Marvel Comics #1000: "Bloodbath" (with Goran Parlov, anthology, 2019) collected in Marvel Comics 1000 (hc, 144 pages, 2020, ISBN 1-302-92137-1)
- The Amazing Spider-Man: Full Circle: "Part Seven" (with Cameron Stewart and Mark Bagley, anthology one-shot, 2019)
- Heroes Reborn: America's Mightiest Heroes (tpb, 232 pages, 2021, ISBN 1-302-92957-7; hc, 568 pages, 2022, ISBN 1-302-94519-X) collects:
  - Heroes Reborn #1–7 (with Ed McGuinness, Dale Keown + Carlos Magno (#2), Federico Vicentini (#3), James Stokoe (#4), R. M. Guera (#5), Erica D'Urso (#6) and Aaron Kuder (#7), 2021)
  - Heroes Return: "The Man Who Rebooted the World" (with Ed McGuinness, one-shot, 2021)
- Miracleman #0: "The Man Whose Dreams Were Miracles" (with Leinil Francis Yu, co-feature, 2022)
- Uncle Scrooge: "Uncle Scrooge and the Infinity Dime" (June, 2024)

=== Image Comics ===
- 24Seven Volume 2: "This Mortal Coil" (with Miguel Alves, anthology graphic novel, 240 pages, 2007, ISBN 1-58240-846-7)
- Pilot Season: Ripclaw (with Jorge Lucas, one-shot, Top Cow, 2007) collected in Pilot Season 2007 (tpb, 144 pages, 2008, ISBN 1-58240-900-5)
- Liberty Comics #2: "First Cens*r" (with Moritat, anthology, 2009) collected in CBLDF Presents: Liberty (hc, 216 pages, 2014, ISBN 1-60706-937-7; tpb, 2016, ISBN 1-60706-996-2)
- Southern Bastards (with Jason Latour):
  - Southern Bastards (with issues #12 and 18 written by Jason Latour and drawn by Chris Brunner, 2014–2018) collected as:
    - Here Was a Man (collects #1–4, tpb, 128 pages, 2014, ISBN 1-63215-016-6)
    - Gridiron (collects #5–8, tpb, 128 pages, 2015, ISBN 1-63215-269-X)
    - Homecoming (collects #9–14, tpb, 128 pages, 2016, ISBN 1-63215-610-5)
    - Gut Check (collects #15–20, tpb, 160 pages, 2018, ISBN 1-5343-0194-1)
  - Thought Bubble Anthology #6: "Earl Around the World" (2017)
- The Goddamned (with R. M. Guéra):
  - The Goddamned #1–5 (2015–2016) collected as The Goddamned: Before the Flood (tpb, 152 pages, 2017, ISBN 1-63215-700-4; hc, 2017, ISBN 1-5343-0318-9)
  - The Goddamned: The Virgin Brides #1–5 (2020–2021) collected as The Goddamned: The Virgin Brides (tpb, 144 pages, 2021, ISBN 1-5343-1720-1)
- Sea of Stars (co-written by Aaron and Dennis Hallum, art by Stephen Green, 2019–2021) collected as:
  - Lost in the Wild Heavens (collects #1–5, tpb, 136 pages, 2020, ISBN 1-5343-1495-4)
  - The People of the Broken Moon (collects #6–11, tpb, 120 pages, 2021, ISBN 1-5343-1834-8)
- The Old Guard: Tales Through Time #5: "An Old Soul" (with Rafael Albuquerque, anthology, 2021) collected in The Old Guard: Tales Through Time (tpb, 176 pages, 2021, ISBN 1-5343-2005-9)
- Bug Wars #1-6 (2025)

=== Other publishers ===
- Country Ass-Whuppin': A Tornado Relief Anthology: "Ass Kicked in Alabama" (with Ryan Cody, one-shot, 12-Gauge Comics, 2012)
- Love is Love (untitled one-page story, with Jason Latour, anthology graphic novel, 144 pages, IDW Publishing, 2016, ISBN 1-63140-939-5)
- Sound and Fury (co-written by Aaron and Ryan Cady, art by Takashi Okazaki, Vasilis Lolos, Rosi Kampe, Rufus Dayglo and Josan González, graphic novel, 144 pages, Z2 Comics, 2021, ISBN 1-940878-35-7)
- Once Upon a Time at the End of the World (with Alexandre Tefenkgi (#1–5), Leila del Duca (#6–10) and Nick Dragotta (#11–15), Boom! Studios, 2022–...) collected as:
  - Love in the Wasteland (collects #1–5, tpb, 176 pages, 2023, ISBN 1-68415-907-5)
  - The Rise and Fall of Golgonooza (collects #6–11, tpb, 176 pages, 2024, ISBN 1-60886-152-X)
- Teenage Mutant Ninja Turtles Vol. 2, IDW Publishing, 2024-

Preceded by Marc Guggenheim	Wolverine writer 2008	Succeeded by Mark Millar
Preceded by Daniel Way	Ghost Rider writer 2008–2010	Succeeded by Rob Williams
Preceded by Mark Millar	Wolverine writer 2009–2012	Succeeded by Cullen Bunn
Preceded by Greg Pak (Incredible Hulks)	The Incredible Hulk writer 2011–2012	Succeeded by Mark Waid (Indestructible Hulk)
Preceded by Matt Fraction	Thor writer 2012–2019	Succeeded by Donny Cates
Preceded by Brian Wood	Star Wars writer 2015–2017	Succeeded by Kieron Gillen
Preceded by Dan Jolley	Doctor Strange writer 2015–2017	Succeeded by Dennis Hopeless
Preceded by Mark Waid	The Avengers writer 2018–2023	Succeeded by Jed MacKay
Preceded by Brian Wood	Conan the Barbarian writer 2019–2020	Succeeded by Jim Zub
Preceded by Matthew Rosenberg	The Punisher writer 2022–2023	Succeeded by n/a
