= Scalped (TV pilot) =

Unaired television pilot

- Genre: Drama; Crime story
- Based on: Scalped by: Jason Aaron; R. M. Guéra
- Developed by: Doug Jung
- Starring: Alex Meraz; Gil Birmingham; Irene Bedard; Chaske Spencer
- Composer: Hannes De Maeyer
- Country of origin: United States
- Original language: English

Production
- Executive producers: Doug Jung; Geoff Johns; Sterlin Harjo
- Camera setup: Single-camera
- Production companies: DC Entertainment; Warner Horizon Television

Original release
- Network: WGN America

Scalped is an American unaired television pilot episode developed by Doug Jung and Geoff Johns for WGN America. It is an adaptation of the comic book series Scalped created by Jason Aaron and R. M. Guéra, and published by DC Comics under their Vertigo imprint.

== Premise ==
Scalped is a modern-day crime story set in the world of a Native American Indian reservation, and explores power, loyalty, and spirituality in a community led by the ambitious Chief Lincoln Red Crow, as he reckons with Dashiell Bad Horse, who has returned home after years away from the reservation.

== Cast and characters ==
The pilot episode featured an all Native American cast:

- Alex Meraz as Dashiell Bad Horse: His return sets him on a violent path of self-discovery about his place on the Rez and on a collision course with both his estranged mother and Red Crow.
- Gil Birmingham as Chief Lincoln Red Crow: A Lakota elder involved in every aspect of life on the reservation.
- Irene Bedard as Gina Bad Horse: A legendary activist and Dashiell's mother.
- Chaske Spencer as Sheriff Falls Down
- Forrest Goodluck as Dino Poor Bear

Lily Gladstone was cast as Carol Red Crow, intended as a recurring role.

== Production ==
In 2014, WGN America was developing a live-action TV show Scalped, based on the Vertigo comic book series of the same name. The pilot order was given in March 2016. By February 2017, Bilall Fallah and Adil El Arbi were attached to direct a pilot. The pilot was filmed in New Mexico in early April, but in November, after WGN saw the pilot episode, they decided to pass on the series.

== Episodes ==
No.	Title	Directed by	Written by	Original release date	Prod. code	US viewers (millions)
1	"Pilot"	Bilall Fallah and Adil El Arbi	Doug Jung	TBA	S001	TBD
