= Esad Ribić =

Croatian comic book artist and animator (born 1972)

Esad T. Ribić
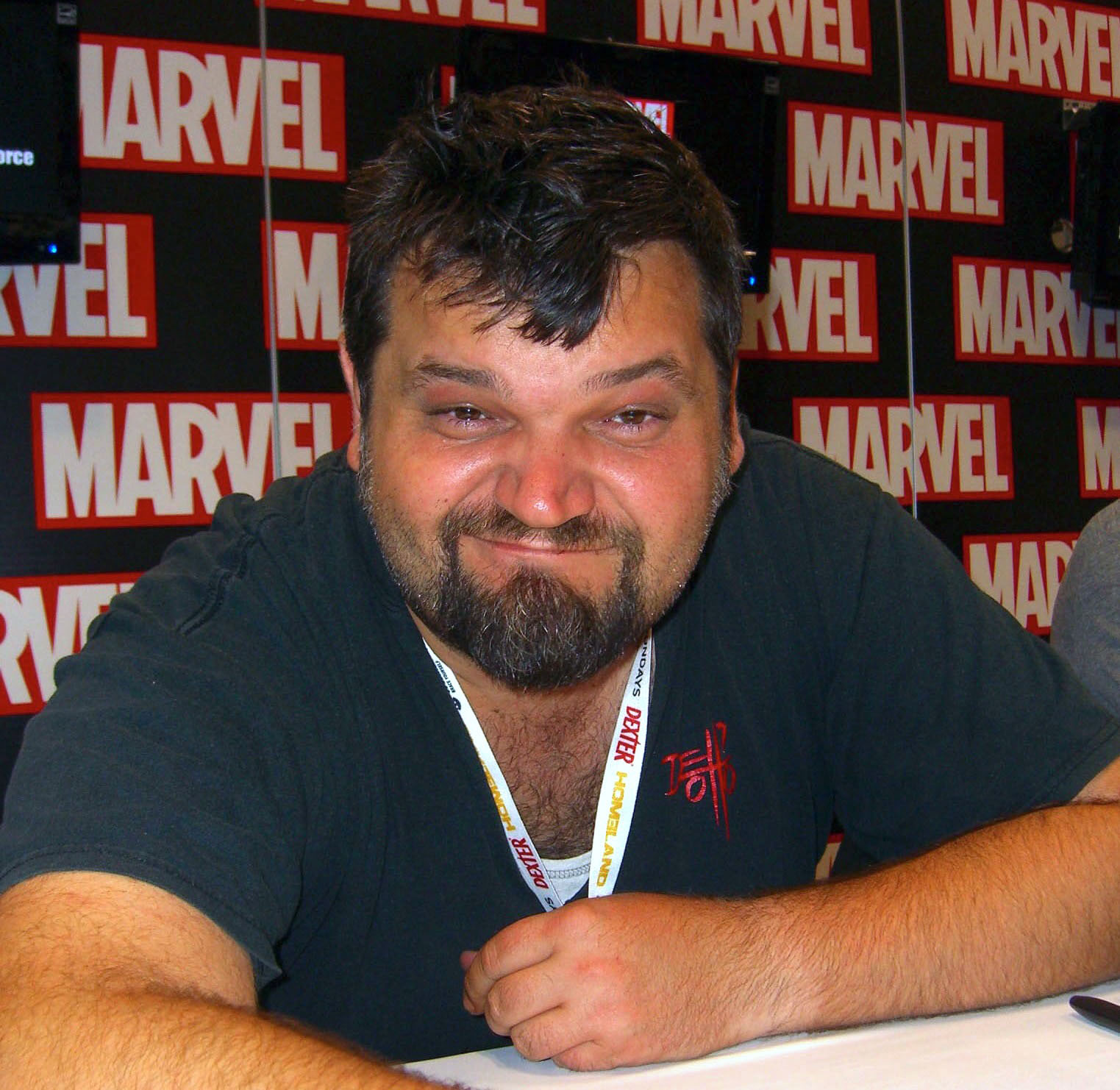
- Ribić at the 2012 New York Comic Con
- Born: November 11, 1972 (age 54) Zagreb, SR Croatia, SFR Yugoslavia
- Areas: Penciller, Inker, Colourist
- Notable works: Loki; Thor: God of Thunder; Secret Wars

Esad T. Ribić (born 10 November 1972) is a Croatian comic book artist and animator, known for his work on various titles for Marvel Comics, including Loki, Silver Surfer: Requiem, Sub-Mariner: The Depths, Thor: God of Thunder and the 2015 Secret Wars.

== Early life ==
Esad T. Ribić was born in 1972 in Zagreb, Croatia and graduated from the School of Applied Arts and Design in Zagreb as a graphic designer.

== Career ==
He worked on computer games, illustrated science-fiction books and had his work published in journals and newspapers such as Modra lasta and Jutarnji list. He started making comics in the early 90s, doing shorts strips and illustrations for the Croatian Plavi magazine (Vjesnik) and German Gespenster Geschichten (Bastei Verlag). Ribić also worked for Zagreb Film as a film animator on such series as The Little Flying Bears and Lapitch the Little Shoemaker.

After Zagreb Film downscaled, Ribić had problems getting paid in Croatia for his work. After Darko Macan and Edvin Biuković got an American contract in mid '90s, Ribić persisted in applying for comic book work abroad, and in 1996 he started work for Antarctic Press. A few years later, he was referred to DC/Vertigo by Biuković, and in 2000 he started working for Marvel Comics.

Ribić illustrated four issues of MarvelComics' Loki in 2004. In 2011–2012, Ribić drew writer Jonathan Hickman's run on Ultimate Comics: The Ultimates.

In January 2013 Ribić and writer Jason Aaron started the series Thor: God of Thunder. This series was voted as the 8th best Thor story by Comicbook.com.

In 2015, Ribić was announced as one of the artists working on the new Méta-Baron series written by Alejandro Jodorowsky and Jerry Frissen, although his chapters were not released due to series cancellation. That May, he drew the Secret Wars limited series with writer Jonathan Hickman. The series was released to positive reviews, with critics praising the storyline, characters, action, and art styles.

It was announced at the 2016 Image Expo that Ribić and Ivan Brandon would be the creative team on the science fiction series, VS, which was released in February 2018.

In 2019 Ribić both wrote and drew the Conan the Barbarian: Exodus one-shot. September 2019 saw the debut of the four-issue miniseries, King Thor, on which Ribić re-teamed with Aaron. In August 2020, Marvel Comics announced that Ribić would draw the series Eternals, which would debut in November 2020.

In April 2024, it was announced that Ribić would draw the miniseries Aliens vs. Avengers, which pits Earth's mightiest heroes against the Xenomorphs. The first issue debuted in July 2024.

== Bibliography ==
=== Interior work ===
- Code Name: Scorpio #1-4 (with Miljenko Horvatić, Antarctic Press, 1996–1997)
- Shotgun Mary: Son of the Beast (with Miljenko Horvatić, one-shot, Antarctic Press, 1997)
- Warrior Nun Areala: Warrior Nun Frenzy #1-2 (with Miljenko Horvatić, Antarctic Press, 1998)
- Strange Adventures vol. 2 #4: "Native Tongue" (with Brian Azzarello, anthology, Vertigo, 2000)
- Flinch #12: "Mondays" (with Scott Cunningham, anthology, Vertigo, 2000)
- Four Horsemen #1-4 (with Robert Rodi, Vertigo, 2000)
- X-Men: Children of the Atom #5-6 (with Joe Casey, Marvel, 2000)
- Cable #86: "Last Man Standing" (with Robert Weinberg, Marvel, 2000)
- Uncanny X-Men Annual #24: "Share" (with Scott Lobdell and Fiona Avery, Marvel, 2000)
- The Brotherhood #1-3 (with X, Marvel, 2001)
- Ultimate X-Men #13-14 (with Chuck Austen, Ultimate Marvel, 2002)
- Loki #1-4 (with Robert Rodi, Marvel, 2004)
- 24Seven Volume 1: "Untitled" (script and art, anthology graphic novel, Image, 2006)
- Marvel Knights: Silver Surfer #1-4: "Requiem" (with J. Michael Straczynski, Marvel, 2007)
- Marvel Knights: Sub-Mariner #1-5: "The Depths" (with Peter Milligan, Marvel, 2008–2009)
- Dark Reign: The List — Wolverine (with Jason Aaron, one-shot, Marvel, 2009)
- X-Men: Second Coming #2: "Chapter 2" (with Mike Carey, co-feature, Marvel, 2010)
- Uncanny X-Force #5-7: "Deathlok Nation" (with Rick Remender, Marvel, 2011)
- Ultimate Comics: The Ultimates #1-9 (with Jonathan Hickman and Brandon Peterson (#5-6), Ultimate Marvel, 2011–2012)
- Thor: God of Thunder #1-5, 7-11, 19-25 (with Jason Aaron, Agustin Alessio (#24), R. M. Guera and Simon Bisley (#25), Marvel, 2013–2014)
- X-Men: Battle of the Atom #2: "Chapter 10" (with Jason Aaron, Brian Michael Bendis and Brian Wood, among other artists, Marvel, 2013)
- The Avengers vol. 5 #24: "Rogue Planet" (with Jonathan Hickman, Mike Deodato Jr., Jackson Guice and Salvador Larroca, Marvel, 2014)
- Secret Wars #1-9 (with Jonathan Hickman, Marvel, 2015–2016)
- Civil War II #8 (with Brian Michael Bendis, among other artists, Marvel, 2017)
- The Unworthy Thor #4 (with Jason Aaron, among other artists, Marvel, 2017)
- Marvel Legacy (with Jason Aaron and various artists, one-shot, Marvel, 2017)
- VS #1-5 (with Ivan Brandon, Image, 2018)
- Conan the Barbarian: Exodus (script and art, one-shot, Marvel, 2019)
- King Thor #1-4 (with Jason Aaron and various artists (#4), Marvel, 2019–2020)
- Eternals #1-10, 12 (with Kieron Gillen, Marvel, 2021-2022)

=== Covers only ===
- Crimson Nun #1-4 (Antarctic Press, 1997)
- Wolverine vol. 2 #181-189 (Marvel, 2002–2003)
- Terminator 3 #2 (Beckett Comics, 2003)
- Wolverine vol. 3 #1-6 (Marvel, 2003)
- Kingpin #1-3 (Marvel, 2003)
- NYC Mech #5 (Image, 2004)
- Black Panther vol. 3 #1-2, 20 (Marvel, 2005–2006)
- Common Foe #1-3 (Desperado Publishing, 2005)
- Toxin #1 (Marvel, 2005)
- House of M #1-8 (Marvel, 2005)
- Ghost Rider vol. 4 #1 (Marvel, 2005)
- Army of Darkness vs. Re-Animator #2 (Dynamite, 2005)
- Negative Burn Winter Special #1 (Desperado Publishing, 2005)
- The Cross Bronx #1 (Image, 2006)
- Silver Surfer Omnibus hc (Marvel, 2007)
- Moon Knight vol. 5 #11-12 (Marvel, 2007)
- Daredevil #501-504 (Marvel, 2009–2010)
- X-Factor #200 (Marvel, 2010)
- Thor #609 (Marvel, 2010)
- The Amazing Spider-Man #636, 688 (Marvel, 2010–2012)
- Robert E. Howard's Savage Sword #1 (Dark Horse, 2010)
- Uncanny X-Force #1-4, 8-18 (Marvel, 2010–2012)
- Astonishing Thor #1 (Marvel, 2010)
- The Outlaw Prince gn (Dark Horse, 2010)
- Ys la légende Volume 1-2 (Soleil, 2011–2012)
- John Carter: The World of Mars #1 (Marvel, 2011)
- X-O Manowar vol. 3 #1 (Valiant, 2012)
- Bloodshot vol. 3 #1, 3 (Valiant, 2012)
- Avengers vs. X-Men #7 (Marvel, 2012)
- Wolverine #309 (Marvel, 2012)
- Untold Tales of Punisher MAX #3 (Marvel, 2012)
- Thor: God of Thunder #6, 12, 16-18 (Marvel, 2013–2014)
- The Avengers vol. 5 #1-2 (Marvel, 2013)
- Cable and X-Force #15 (Marvel, 2013)
- Drifter #1 (Image, 2014)
- Thor vol. 4 #1-2 (Marvel, 2014–2015)
- Avengers and X-Men: AXIS #6 (Marvel, 2015)
- The Goddamned #3 (Image, 2016)
- Civil War II #0 (Marvel, 2016)
- Civil War II: Kingpin #1 (Marvel, 2016)
- Star Wars: The Force Awakens #1, 6 (Marvel, 2016–2017)
- Black Panther vol. 5 #5-8 (Marvel, 2016–2017)
- Infamous Iron Man #1 (Marvel, 2016)
- Gamora #1-5 (Marvel, 2017)
- Green Arrow vol. 5 #27 (DC Comics, 2017)
- The Avengers #677 (Marvel, 2018)
- The Mighty Thor #705 (Marvel, 2018)
- The Avengers vol. 7 #1 (Marvel, 2018)
- Thor vol. 5 #1, 5-6 (Marvel, 2018)
- Thanos Legacy #1 (Marvel, 2018)
- Fantastic Four vol. 6 #1-9, 11-13 (Marvel, 2018–2019)
- Uncanny X-Men vol. 5 #6 (Marvel, 2019)
- Guardians of the Galaxy vol. 5 #1 (Marvel, 2019)
- Conan the Barbarian #1-ongoing (Marvel, 2019–...)
