= Manifest Destiny (disambiguation) =

Manifest destiny was a widely held belief in the United States that its settlers were destined to expand across North America.

Manifest Destiny may also refer to:

== Music ==
- Manifest Destiny (opera), a 2003 opera by Keith Burstein
- Manifest Destiny (Brand X album), 1997
- Manifest Destiny (The Dictators album)
- "Manifest Destiny/Sorority Tears", a 2006 song by Guster
- "Manifest Destiny" (Jamiroquai song), 1994
- Manifest Destiny, a 1974 musical comedy written by Filipino politician Raul Manglapus
- "Manifest Destiny", a 1988 song by Dirty Rotten Imbeciles from the album 4 of a Kind

== Other ==
- "Manifest Destiny" (The Outer Limits), an episode of the TV series The Outer Limits
- Manifest Destiny (Terriers), an episode of the TV series Terriers
- X-Men: Manifest Destiny, a 2008 storyline involving the X-Men
  - Wolverine: Manifest Destiny, four-issue limited series
- Manifest Destiny, a 2016 comic book by Chris Dingess; see Skybound Entertainment § Comics
