= The Goddamned =

Comic series by Jason Aaron

The Goddamned is an Image Comics series written by Jason Aaron and illustrated by R. M. Guéra that follows the story of the biblical character Cain.

== Background ==
The Goddamned was published by Image Comics. The comics are written by Jason Aaron, illustrated by R. M. Guéra, colored by Giulia Brusco, and lettered by Jared K. Fletcher. The Goddamned was Aaron's follow up to Scalped. The story of The Goddamned follows the biblical character of Cain. Jason Aaron was raised in the Southern Baptist Church and has since renounced religion. The comics contain quite a bit of profanity. The comics debuted with an over-sized 30-page issue. "The Virgin Brides" was originally going to be released on May 6, 2020. "The Virgin Brides" was released on July 1, 2020. Kotaku compared it to the Conan the Barbarian comics.
