= Avengers Assemble (event) =

2022 comic book storyline

- The standard cover art for Avengers Assemble Alpha. Art by Bryan Hitch.
- Publisher: Marvel Comics
- Publication date: November 2022 – April 2023
- Main character(s): Avengers; Multiversal Masters of Evil; Mephisto; Nighthawk; Odin

Creative team
- Writer: Jason Aaron
- Penciller(s): Bryan Hitch; Javier Garrón; Aaron Kuder; Jim Towe; Ivan Fiorelli
- Inker: Mark Farmer
- Letterer: Cory Petit
- Colorist: Alex Sinclair
- Editor(s): Martin Biro; Annalise Bissa; Tom Brevoort

"Avengers Assemble" is an American comic book crossover storyline written by Jason Aaron with art by Bryan Hitch, Aaron Kuder, and Javier Garron, published in 2022 by Marvel Comics. The story, while serving as the final story of Jason Aaron's Avengers that ties into his Avengers Forever series, involves the Avengers teaming up their Prehistoric selves and alternate versions of themselves to fight against Mephisto's army and a multiversal version of Masters of Evil who plan to wreak havoc on the multiverse. The event overall received mixed reviews, with critics criticizing the inconsistent art, the writing, and the story.

== Publication history ==
In September 2022, Marvel Comics announced that Jason Aaron will create an event called Avengers Assemble where the present Avengers will team up with the Avengers of 1,000,000 BC and alternate versions of themselves to fight off against Mephisto and his army.

== Plot summary ==
=== Prelude ===
During the Damnation storyline, Mephisto is defeated by Doctor Strange at Hotel Inferno. Mephisto revives Phil Coulson and gives him the Pandemonium Cube to rewrite history. Phil Coulson created an alternate timeline where Squadron Supreme were the superheroes and Avengers never existed. Phil Coulson was defeated, but this allowed Mephisto to demonstrate to his alternate versions how effective they would be if they teamed up to change reality.

Mephisto teams up with two other versions of himself to create a multiversal version of Masters of Evil to wipe out multiple versions of the Avengers. Mephisto plans to go to the Genesis Point of Earth-616 History to wipe out the Avengers, and the Avengers travel back in time to pursue Mephisto. Mephisto's other target is the Avengers of the 1,000,000 B.C. (a younger Odin, ancient versions of Black Panther, Iron Fist, Ghost Rider, Phoenix Force, Agamotto (the first Sorcerer Supreme), and Starbrand (a human named V'nn who resembles Red Hulk). Meanwhile, a mysterious character named Avengers Prime sends out Deathloks to protect the timeline from Mephisto. Robbie Reyes goes out to meet alternate versions of Avengers to convince them to fight Mephisto. Robbie turns into the All-Rider (a Ghost Rider who can turn anything into a vehicle). He takes down some of the Multiversal Masters of Evil members and nearly loses his life fighting against an alternate version of Doctor Doom called Doom Supreme (leader of the Multiversal Masters of Evil), but is saved by a Deathlok who tells Robbie that he will be a key player to stopping Mephisto.

=== Main plot ===
The Modern Avengers (Steve Rogers, Iron Man, Captain Marvel, Nighthawk, Thor, Jane Foster, Namor and Echo) meet the Prehistoric Avengers by traveling to the past, however after Agamotto is suddenly attacked by fire, the Prehistoric Avengers mistakenly believe that Echo (who is the host of the Phoenix Force) is attacking Agamotto, and they fight. After Thor and Odin hit each other with Mjolnir which caused the majority of heroes to be knocked out, Doom Supreme arrives to kill Starbrand and takes Agamotto's eyes. Doctor Supreme sends out his Multiversal Masters of Evil members King Killmonger (a variant of Killmonger wearing the Destroyer armor), Ghost Goblin (a variant of Green Goblin with Ghost Rider abilities), Black Skull (one of the variants of Red Skull who has the Venom symbiote), a younger version of Thanos called Kid Thanos, Dark Phoenix (an evil version of Phoenix Force) and her pet Berserker (an evil version of Wolverine that was also called Hound). Meanwhile, Avengers Prime is wounded by an army of Mephistos. Robbie Reyes arrives with an alternate version of Tony Stark who operates as Ant-Man on The God Quarry (a boundary between realities) where he realizes he can't activate his powers.

Dark Phoenix tries destroying the modern and past Avengers, but it fails and the Avengers attack the Multiversal Masters of Evil. Prehistoric Ghost Rider kills Ghost Goblin and Dark Phoenix and Doom Supreme combine their powers to try to destroy the universe, but Jane Foster and Prehistoric Ghost Rider try to burn off Doom Supreme's magic, with Prehistoric Ghost Rider sacrificing himself. Meanwhile, the Phoenix Force hears the battle that is going on, and goes to Earth.

After meeting with the alternate versions of the Avengers on the God Quarry, Robbie Reyes is attacked by an army of different Mephistos. The alternate versions of Avengers manage to deal heavy damage to the army of Mephisto, while Tony Stark (who is Ant-Man in his universe) asks where Avengers Prime is. An alternate version of Vision and Moon Knight (name Mariama Spector) from Ant-Man's reality tells Ant-Man that Avenger Prime may have been captured. They then shrink down and go to tunnels underneath the battlefield where they find out that Mephisto plans to gain access to universal energy on God Quarry, which will destroy the Multiverse. Just when Stark is about to be killed, Old Man Phoenix (an elderly Wolverine with the Phoenix Force from Earth-14412) arrives with King Thor's daughters to save them.

Prehistoric Iron Fist takes down King Killmonger, while Iron Man confronts an alternate version of Howard Stark from Earth-4111 who operates as Iron Inquisitor. The alternate Howard Stark asks Iron Man to join him. When Iron Man refuses, Howard stark uses an EMP to neutralize his armor and attack him, but Iron Man defeats his alternate father. The Black Skull deals heavy damage to Captain America, Nighthawk, and Agamotto, but is pushed back by the combined efforts of Thor, Odin, Namor, and Captain Marvel. Kid Thanos uses the Venom symbiote from the defeated Black Skull to push the rest of the Avengers back. Jane Foster and Echo try fighting off Dark Phoenix, who is revealed to be an evil version of Mystique of Earth-14412. Dark Phoenix escapes and meets with Doom Supreme who reveals that he is assembling an army of Doctor Dooms on Doom the Living Planet.

Old Man Phoenix recalls that he fought against Dark Phoenix in the White Hot Room (Marvel's version of the Afterlife and base of operations for the Phoenix Force) where Dark Phoenix sent his body parts across every direction. King Thor's granddaughter meet Mangog and fought him in order to retrieve Old Man Phoenix's parts. In the present, Old Man Phoenix arrive to help Ant-Man and his allies repel the Mephisto army. Just then, the Doom planet arrives and Doom Supreme appears. Doom Supreme puts a magic barrier to protect himself, but Avengers Prime arrives after dealing with Mephisto, and reveals himself to be Loki.

Avengers Prime recounts his backstory where in his universe, Thor died due to Mjolnir being sentient and flying Thor to the sun. Loki overthrew Odin as the All Father, but grew bored of his power. Avengers Prime traveled to different universes where he observed that the Avengers will defeat Loki everytime. To prevent that from happening, Avengers Prime prevented the Avengers in his timeline from happening. As a result, other cosmic beings like Galactus, Thanos, Gorr the God Butcher, Celestials and Red Skull converge on Earth. Avengers Prime manages to defeat everyone, but grows bored and throws himself to the sun only to be taken to the God Quarry. The God Quarry forces Loki to create a headquarter where alternate versions of the Avengers will reside in. In the present, Loki manages to dispatch the rest of Doom Supreme and Mephisto's army and creates a portal where the modern and prehistoric Avengers appear.

Kid Thanos mocks Mephisto on his failures when he finds Kid Thanks near an unconscious Red Skull and the corpse of his fallen teammates. When Mephisto enters the God Quarry, the Council of Red is not happy with Mephisto's progress in defeating the Avengers. Mephisto murders the entire Council of Red and absorbs their power. As the main Avengers help out their alternate counterparts, Old Man Phoenix and Echo try to take on Doom the Living Planet as Avengers Prime and Loki defeat Doom Supreme, but Mephisto appears as the final enemy. During the chaos, Ka-Zar arrives with the Power Cosmic as well as the alternate version of Galactus that empowered him and the Progenitor Celestial. King Thor's granddaughters pick up their own Mjolnirs as they get ready to fight Doom Supreme and Mephisto.

Mephisto easily decimates the Avengers, but the Progenitor with Deathlok upgrades shoots a bullet that wounds Mephisto. Avenger Prime and Loki try to take on Doom Supreme once more, Robbie Reyes and an aging Starbrand talk about their destiny before joining the fight, and the Phoenix Force-possessed Lady Phoenix arrives to help Thor defeat Dark Phoenix. Mephisto gains enough power to destroy the Doom Planet in order to free an ancient Multiverse and Avengers Prime realizes that Mephisto's goal was to never rewrite the Marvel Multiverse, but end it.

An ocean beneath the God Quarry threatens to drown multiple Marvel universes, but Old Man Phoenix manages to reseal it briefly. Doom Supreme mocks Mephisto, saying that he wants to destroy the Marvel Multiverse because he is too weak and wants to free himself from boredom. Doom Supreme knocks Mephisto unconscious and starts absorbing Mephisto's power, but is defeated by a sneak attack from Iron Man and his Ant-Man counterpart. Avengers Prime convinces a Deathlok-upgraded Progenitor to help contain the geyser, while Echo and Lady Phoenix manage to defeat Dark Phoenix. When Doom Supreme uses his spell on a sample of the ancient Multiverse's powers, it petrifies him. The two Phoenix Forces and Thor manage to hold back the geyser while Robbie Reyes and Starboard seemingly sacrifice themselves to seal off the flood for good. Everyone returns back to their respective time and places, with Thor introducing Echo to Freya and Gaea, Nighthawk patrols New York City, Namor is sent to Seagate Prison, the Avengers create statues for Robbie and Starbrand in the North Pole, Mephisto is tormented by Orb who sits nearby his thrown telling him of things that are happening on Earth, Avenger Prime creates his own Avengers team from across the Multiverse, and Robbie is revealed to still be alive and rebuilding his car.

== Reading order ==
- Avengers Assemble Alpha #1
- Avengers Vol. 8 #63
- Avengers Forever Vol. 2 #12
- Avengers Vol. 8 #64
- Avengers Forever Vol. 2 #13
- Avengers Vol. 8 #65
- Avengers Forever Vol. 2 #14
- Avengers Vol. 8 #66
- Avengers Forever Vol. 2 #15
- Avengers Assemble Omega #1

== Critical reception ==
The event overall received mixed reviews. On Comicbookroundup, the entire event received an average rating of 6.6 out of 10 based on 267 reviews. Story Babbler from Comicbook Dispatch wrote "Avengers Assemble Omega #1 finally concludes not only this storyline but Jason Aaron's entire Avengers run. Unfortunately, it's pretty underwhelming in most of the writing, particularly with Mephisto's motives and goal, along with how abruptly the villains are defeated so the Avengers could all basically fight a cosmic flood which feels aimless until the solution finally shows up."

== Collected editions ==
Title	Material collected	Published Date	ISBN
Avengers Assemble	Avengers Assemble Alpha #1, Avengers (2018) #63-66, Avengers Forever (2021) #12-15, Avengers Assemble Omega #1	July 19, 2023	978-1302950637
