= Raffaello Pagliaccetti =

Italian sculptor

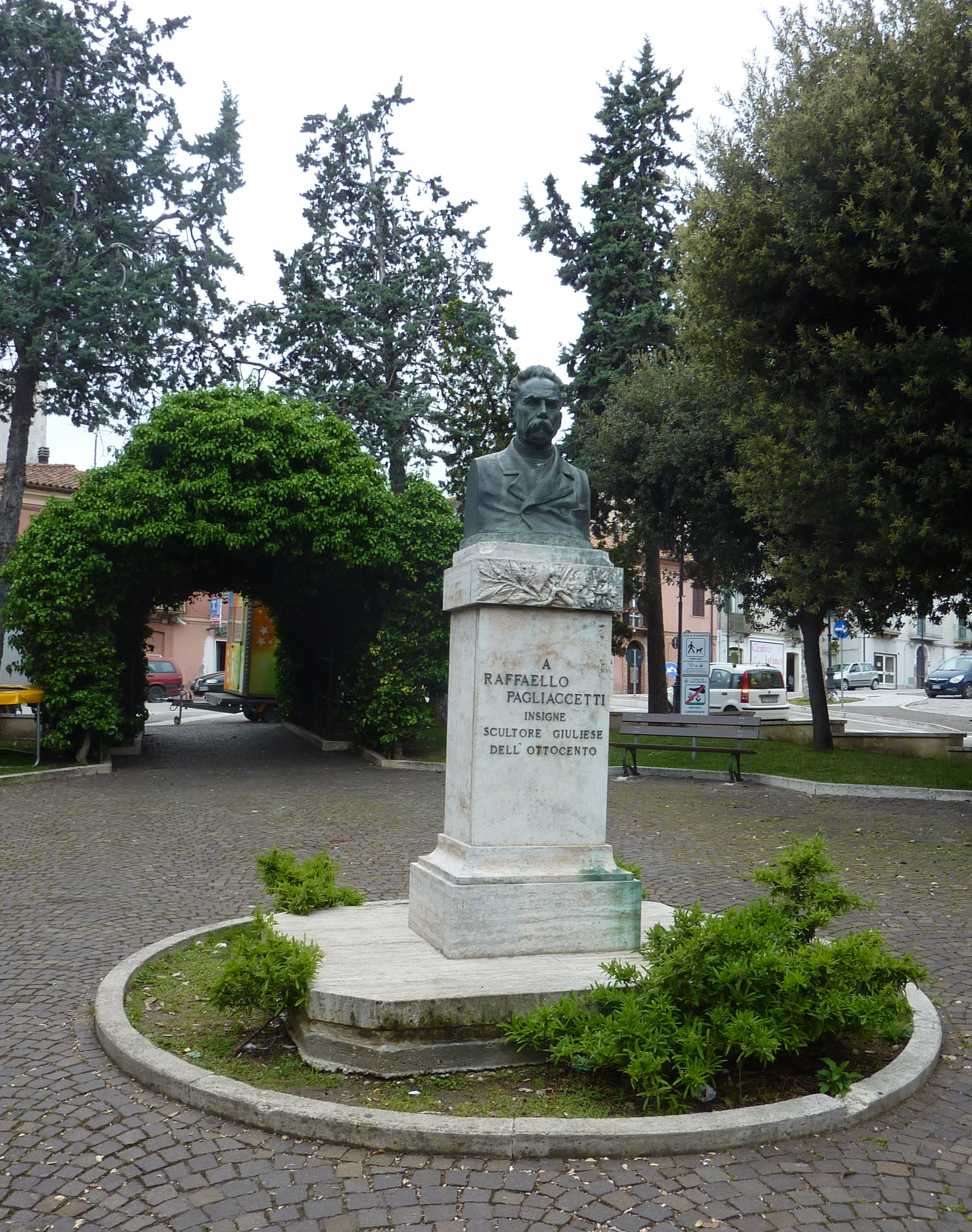
Bust of Pagliaccetti in Giulianova

Raffaello Pagliaccetti (31 October 1839 – 8 May 1900) was an Italian sculptor, active mainly in Florence.

== Biography ==
Raffaello Pagliaccetti was born in Giulianova in the province of Teramo, and received his first art instruction from the painter Flaviano Bucci and his wife. In 1857, he was sent to study at the French Academy in Rome, then in the Academy of St Luke. In 1860, he was able to win the 2nd prize third class in sculpture. The next year, he won first prize in a school competition with a sculpture of Silenus and a Child Bacchus. That year, he moved to Florence, where he encountered or studied under sculptors of the Florentine Academy such as Aristodemo Costoli, Giovanni Dupre, Pio Fedi, and Emilio Santarelli. He gained patronage from the royal family. At the Exposition of the Societa Promotrice delle Belle Arti, he was awarded the gold medal for some busts, including of Gioacchino Rossini, and a full-size statue of the Duke of Aosta. In 1873, he won awards at an Exposition in Vienna. He sent a plaster statue of Garibaldi a Caprera to the Centennial Exposition (1876) in Philadelphia. He was named Academic of the Academy of Florence.

He continued to produce busts and portraits in stone and marble. In Giulianova. Pagliaccetti has at least two sculptures on public display, the Monument to Vittorio Emanuele II (1889) and a Monument to Giannina Milli, a regional Improvisatori poet.
