= Gorr the God Butcher =

Marvel Comics supervillain

- Gorr (left) fighting Thor in the textless cover of Thor: God of Thunder #5 (April 2013); Art by Esad Ribic

Publication information
- Publisher: Marvel Comics
- First appearance: Thor: God of Thunder #2 (January 2013)
- Created by: Jason Aaron; Esad Ribic

In-story information
- Alter ego: Gorr
- Species: Unknown alien race
- Place of origin: Unnamed planet
- Notable aliases: Gorr the Redeemer; Killer of Gods; Butcher of Gods; The Black Butcher
- Abilities: Necrosword: Superhuman strength, speed, durability, and reflexes; Strengthen its power each time it slays a god; Constituent-matter manipulation; Regenerative healing factor; Dark energy manipulation; Virtual immortality

Gorr the God Butcher is a supervillain appearing in American comic books published by Marvel Comics. Created by Jason Aaron and Esad Ribic, Gorr first appeared in Thor: God of Thunder #2 (January 2013). Gorr the God Butcher has been described as one of Marvel's most notable and powerful supervillains, as well as one of Thor's greatest foes.

The character made his live-action debut in the Marvel Cinematic Universe film Thor: Love and Thunder, portrayed by Christian Bale. He appears as a playable character in the video game Marvel Rivals.

== Publication history ==
Jason Aaron and Esad Ribic decided to relaunch the Thor franchise during the Marvel NOW! initiative. Gorr first appeared in Thor: God of Thunder #2 (January 2013). He was the primary antagonist of the God of Thunder run through to Thor: God of Thunder #11 (August 2013).

== Fictional character biography ==
Gorr grew up on a nameless barren planet ravaged by earthquakes and vicious predatory animals, with little water or soil for sustenance. When his mother, mate, and children died from starvation and thirst, Gorr openly questioned if his people's gods existed, an act of heresy that led his tribe to cast him out. Gorr bore witness to a battle between Knull, the god of darkness, and an unnamed god, which concluded with Knull's defeat. However when the wounded golden god begged for his help, Gorr was enraged by their pleas as the gods never answered those of his family. His anger awakened Knull's weapon, which he used to kill the golden god before swearing revenge against all gods for failing those who worshipped them.

Gorr battled Thor in medieval Iceland early in his quest. In the present day, Gorr travels centuries into the future to continue his campaign against the gods. Gorr intends to set off the "Godbomb", which has the stolen power of the Time Gods, and will kill every god in the past, present, and future when detonated. Thor escapes and joins forces with his other selves to mount a new attack, but this assault fails and all three Thors are captured. Gorr's "son", actually a construct made from All-Black the Necrosword, releases Thor from captivity and asks him to kill Gorr. As Thor dives into the heart of the Godbomb wielding both his Mjolnir and the Mjolnir of his older self, the prayers of all the gods from across time gives Thor the power to absorb the blast. Thor from the present then uses the two Mjolnirs to kill Gorr.

Millions of years into the future, Gorr is resurrected through the Necrosword by Loki to kill Thor. More powerful than ever, Gorr attempts to destroy the universe. However, he is stopped by Thor, rendered amnesiac, and sent to live out the rest of his life on Indigarr.

Gorr returns in the series Phoenix, where he is defeated by Jean Grey and turned into a star.

== Powers and abilities ==
Gorr is a mortal with no superhuman abilities. He primarily wields All-Black the Necrosword, a symbiote that takes the form of a sword. The sword grants superhuman strength, durability, speed, and reflexes. The blade lets its user create different constructs, such as wings allowing the user flight at extreme speeds, magical weapons, sharp tendrils that can kill any god, including Asgardians, and a shroud of Berserkers constructed out of darkness. The sword grants virtual immortality and allows its wielder to recover quickly from injuries. Additionally, each time a god is slain by the blade, it provides more power to its wielder.

== Reception ==
=== Critical reception ===
Darby Harn of Screen Rant called Gorr one of Thor's "very powerful and very well-regarded villains," writing, "Gorr The God Butcher is a popular villain with fans in large measure because of how successful he was. He lived up to his name by killing most of the gods of the Marvel Universe, leaving an older Thor virtually alone on the throne of Asgard in a dark future. Gorr is one of Thor's coolest comic book villains in recent years, with a ghostly look and a weapon, the Necrosword, that has a connection to the alien symbiote that spawned Venom."

=== Accolades ===
- In 2015, Screen Rant included Gorr in their "20 Most Powerful Marvel Villains" list.
- In 2018, CBR.com ranked Gorr 15th in their "Marvel's 20 Strongest Villains" list.
- In 2018, ComicsVerse ranked Gorr 10th in their "Top 10 Most Formidable Thor Villains" list.
- In 2020, CBR.com ranked Gorr 7th in their "20 Of Thor's Strongest Villains Ranked From Weakest To Most Powerful" list.
- In 2021, Screen Rant included Gorr in their "Thor Comics: 5 Heroes Fans Hated (& 5 Villains They Loved)" list.
- In 2022, Digital Trends ranked Gorr 12th in their "Every Marvel villain ranked from worst to best" list.
- In 2022, The A.V. Club ranked Gorr 14th in their "28 best Marvel villains" list.
- In 2022, Screen Rant included Gorr in their "10 Most Powerful Thor Villains, In The Movies & Comics" list and in their "17 Best Thor Villains From The Comics, Ranked Lamest To Coolest" list.

== In other media ==
- Gorr the God Butcher appears in Thor: Love and Thunder, portrayed by Christian Bale.
- Gorr the God Butcher appears as a playable character in Marvel: Future Fight.
- Gorr the God Butcher appears as a playable character in Marvel Strike Force.
- Gorr the God Butcher appears as a playable character in Marvel Rivals, voiced by Beau Marie.
