= Wolverine: Manifest Destiny =

Marvel limited comic series

- Cover to Wolverine: Manifest Destiny #1. Art by Dave Wilkins.

Publication information
- Publisher: Marvel Comics
- Schedule: Bimonthly
- Format: Limited series
- Genre: Superhero
- Publication date: October 2008 - April 2009
- No. of issues: 4
- Main character: Wolverine

Creative team
- Written by: Jason Aaron
- Artist: Stephen Segovia
- Colorist: John Rauch

Wolverine: Manifest Destiny is a four-issue comic book limited series starring Wolverine and published by Marvel Comics. The series was written by Jason Aaron with art by Stephen Segovia and colored by John Rauch. It is a part of X-Men: Manifest Destiny

== Plot summary ==
After the return of his memory, Logan returns to San Francisco's Chinatown to settle a fifty-year-old score with a now-elderly crime lady who was also a past love interest.

== Reception ==
IGN gave the first issue a 7.2 out of ten and the final issue a 7.8.

== Merchandise ==
Dave Wilkins's cover art for the first issue was used on a Wolverine themed computer mouse.

== Collected editions ==
Title	Material collected	Publication date	ISBN
X-Men: Manifest Destiny	Wolverine: Manifest Destiny #1-4; X-Men Manifest Destiny: Nightcrawler #1, and X-Men: Manifest Destiny #1-5	September, 2009	9780785139515
Wolverine by Jason Aaron: The Complete Collection 1	Wolverine (vol. 3) #56, 62–65; material from #73–74; Wolverine: Manifest Destiny 1–4; Wolverine: Weapon X 1–5; material from Wolverine (vol. 2) #175	December 2013	978-0785185413
