= Flaviano =

Flaviano is a surname and a given name. Notable people with the name include:

Given name:

- Flaviano Bucci (1817–1906), Italian painter
- Flaviano Labò (1927–1991), Italian operatic tenor
- Flaviano Michele Melki (1858–1915), Eastern Catholic prelate
- Flaviano Melo (1949–2024), Brazilian civil engineer and politician
- Flaviano Olivares (1911–1997), Philippine Brigadier general
- Flaviano Vicentini (1942–2002), Italian road race cyclist
- Flaviano Yengko (1874–1897), Filipino general during the Philippine Revolution

Surname:

- Joana Flaviano (born 1990), Spanish footballer

== See also ==
- SS San Flaviano, British oil tanker
- San Flaviano, Montefiascone, Roman Catholic church in Montefiascone, Italy
- Flaviano Díaz Stadium, football stadium in Asunción, Paraguay
