= A+X =

Comic book series

- Cover of A+X #1 (October 2012). Art by Dale Keown.

Publication information
- Publisher: Marvel Comics
- Schedule: Monthly
- Format: Ongoing series
- Genre: Superhero
- Publication date: October 2012 – March 2014
- No. of issues: 18
- Main character(s): Avengers; X-Men

Creative team
- Created by: Jeph Loeb; Dale Keown; Dan Slott; Ron Garney
- Written by: various
- Artist: various

A+X is a monthly comic book anthology series that was published by Marvel Comics from October 2012 to March 2014 as part of the company's Marvel NOW! initiative. Each issue includes two stories by different creative teams featuring a different team-up of an Avenger and an X-Man.

== Publication history ==
The series was launched as a follow-up to the 2012 event Avengers Vs. X-Men and its spinoff title, AVX: VS. According to X-Men editor Nick Lowe, "Because AvX Versus did so well, and we enjoyed doing it so much and the fans embraced it so much, we wanted to keep that kind of thing going. With Versus there are two 10-page stories per issue. The top talent telling the story, with the best characters that Marvel has to offer. A+X is going to follow up with that, and we're going to have an Avenger and an X-Man on each team." The series came to an end with issue #18 in March 2014.

== Issues ==
Issue	Team-up	Creative team	Ref.
A+X #1 (October 2012)	Hulk and Wolverine	Jeph Loeb (W) and Dale Keown (A)	
A+X #1 (October 2012)	Captain America and Cable	Dan Slott (W) and Ron Garney (A)	
A+X #2 (November 2012)	Black Widow and Rogue	Chris Bachalo (W/A)	
A+X #2 (November 2012)	Iron Man and Kitty Pryde	Peter David (W) and Mike del Mundo (A)	
A+X #3 (December 2012)	Black Panther and Storm	Jason Aaron (W) and Pasqual Ferry (A)	
A+X #3 (December 2012)	Hawkeye and Gambit	James Asmus (W) and Billy Tan (A)	
A+X #4 (January 2013)	Spider-Man and Beast	Kaare Andrews (W/A)	
A+X #4 (January 2013)	Captain America and Quentin Quire	Jason Latour (W) and David López (A)	
A+X #5 (February 2013)	Iron Fist and Doop	Kathryn Immonen (W) and David Lafuente (A)	
A+X #5 (February 2013)	Loki and Mister Sinister	Kieron Gillen (W) and Joe Bennet (A)	
A+X #6 (March 2013)	Captain Marvel and Wolverine	Peter David (W) and Giuseppe Camuncoli (A)	
A+X #6 (March 2013)	Thing and Gambit	Mike Costa (W) and Stefano Casseli (A)	
A+X #7 (April 2013)	Iron Man and Beast	Zeb Wells (W) and Dale Keown (A)	
A+X #7 (April 2013)	Thor and Iceman	Christopher Yost (W) and R'John Bernales and Chris Turcotte (A)	
A+X #8 (May 2013)	Spider-Woman and Kitty Pryde	Gerry Duggan (W) and Salvador Larroca (A)	
A+X #8 (May 2013)	Hawkeye and Deadpool	Christopher Hastings (W) and Reilly Brown (A)	
A+X #9 (June 2013)	Captain America and Wolverine	Nathan Edmondson (W) and Humberto Ramos (A)	
A+X #9 (June 2013)	Doctor Strange, Quentin Quire, Pixie and Eye-Boy	David Lapham (W/A)	
A+X #10 (July 2013)	Black Widow and Fantomex	B. Clay Moore (W) and Kris Anka (A)	
A+X #10 (July 2013)	Scarlet Witch and Domino	Adam Warren (W/A)	
A+X #11 (August 2013)	Thor and Magik	Mike Benson (W) and Mark Texeira (A)	
A+X #11 (August 2013)	Spider-Man and Cyclops	Jim Kruger (W) and David LaFuente (A)	
A+X #12 (September 2013)	Wonder Man and Beast	Christos Gage (W) and Mike Deodato (A)	
A+X #12 (September 2013)	Captain America and Jubilee	Justin Jordan (W) and Angel Unzueta (A)	
A+X #13 (October 2013)	Captain America and Cyclops	Gerry Duggan (W) and David Yardin (A)	
A+X #13 (October 2013)	Black Widow and Emma Frost	Howard Chaykin (W/A)	
A+X #14 (November 2013)	Captain America and Cyclops	Gerry Duggan (W) and David Yardin (A)	
A+X #14 (November 2013)	Superior Spider-Man and Magneto	Max Bemis (W) and David Lafuente (A)	
A+X #15 (December 2013)	Doctor Strange and Beast	Jai Nitz (W) and Greg Smallwood (A)	
A+X #15 (December 2013)	Captain America and Cyclops	Gerry Duggan (W) and David Yardin (A)	
A+X #16 (January 2014)	Spider-Man and Psylocke	Sean Ryan (W) and Goran Parlov (A)	
A+X #16 (January 2014)	Captain America and Cyclops	Gerry Duggan (W) and David Yardin (A)	
A+X #17 (February 2014)	Iron Man and Broo	Jeff Loveness (W) and Paco Diaz (A)	
A+X #17 (February 2014)	Captain America and Cyclops	Gerry Duggan (W) and David Yardin (A)	
A+X #18 (March 2014)	Vision and Kitty Pryde	Jim Krueger (W) and Will Sliney (A)	
A+X #18 (March 2014)	Captain America and Cyclops	Gerry Duggan (W) and David Yardin (A)	

== Collected editions ==
Title	Material collected	Publication date	ISBN
A+X – Volume 1: = Awesome	A+X #1–6	June 4, 2013	978-0785166740
A+X – Volume 2: = Amazing	A+X #7–12	December 3, 2013	978-0785166757
A+X – Volume 3: = Outstanding	A+X #13–18	June 3, 2014	978-0785190110
