= Scalped (comics) =

Comic

- Cover to the first trade paperback by Jock.

Publication information
- Publisher: Vertigo
- Schedule: Monthly
- Format: Ongoing series
- Genre: Crime
- Publication date: March 2007 – August 2012
- No. of issues: 60

Creative team
- Created by: Jason Aaron; R. M. Guéra
- Written by: Jason Aaron
- Artist(s): R. M. Guéra; Davide Furno
- Letterer(s): Phil Balsman; Steve Wands
- Colorist(s): Lee Loughridge; Giulia Brusco
- Editor(s): Will Dennis; Casey Seijas

Collected editions
- Indian Country: ISBN 1-4012-1317-0
- Casino Boogie: ISBN 1401216544
- Dead Mothers: ISBN 1401219195
- The Gravel in Your Gut: ISBN 1401221793
- High Lonesome: ISBN 1401224873
- The Gnawing: ISBN 1401227171

Scalped is a 60-issue crime/western comic book series written by Jason Aaron and illustrated by R. M. Guéra, published monthly by Vertigo Comics. Issue #1 was published on January 3, 2007.

The series focuses on the Oglala Lakota inhabitants of the fictional Prairie Rose Indian Reservation in modern-day South Dakota as they grapple with organized crime, rampant poverty, drug addiction and alcoholism, local politics and the preservation of their cultural identity.

== Inspiration ==
Scalped originally began as a prospective relaunch of Scalphunter, an older DC character. As development proceeded, much of the original concept was abandoned in favor of the current plot.

Jason Aaron has said the plot of the comic is partly inspired by Leonard Peltier, a Native American activist who was arrested for the murder of two FBI agents in a reservation shootout in 1975.

== Plot ==
=== Indian Country ===
After fifteen years of absence, Dashiell Bad Horse returns to the "Rez" and is promptly arrested and taken to Lincoln Red Crow, President of the Oglala Tribal Council and Sheriff of the Tribal Police. Red Crow, bemoaning the prevalence of "half-breed" Indians and desiring more enforcers to counteract the nativists protesting his new Crazy Horse Casino, hires Bad Horse onto the Tribal Police Force. After raiding a number of meth labs to clean up the Reservations' public image before the opening of the casino, it would appear Bad Horse has cemented his reputation as a ruthless and effective Tribal officer. In reality, Bad Horse is an undercover FBI agent, overseen by SAC Agent Baylis Earl Nitz and ordered to find evidence linking Red Crow to the murder of two FBI agents thirty years ago, during Red Crow's time as a member of Native-American rights organization, co-run with Dashiell's estranged mother, Gina Bad Horse.

Dashiell's initial doubts about the undercover operation are exacerbated when he and his partner, Officer Falls Down, are sent by Red Crow to raid a meth house without backup. Bursting into the house, the pair are ambushed by a gang of gunmen, which succeed in wounding Falls Down but are all killed by the ruthless Dashiell. Confronting Nitz at a pre-staged meeting point, Dashiell angrily argues with him before breaking away in disgust, realizing his job is far from over. Declaring Dashiell an arrogant, reckless, stubborn, out-of-control "borderline sociopath with deep-seated anger", Nitz remains convinced that he's perfect for the undercover assignment.

=== Hoka Hey ===
In issues #4 and #5, the relationship between Gina and Red Crow is explored in flashback as Gina hunts for Dash before leaving town to visit Lawrence Belcourt, the man charged with the 1975 murder of two FBI Agents. Meanwhile, Dash runs off all of Carol's lovers before sleeping with her. The issues reveal how Dash was recruited into the FBI, and at the end, Gina's body is shown scalped and abandoned in the wilderness. The term "Hoka Hey" is used by Catcher as a toast to the Dog Soldiers.

=== Casino Boogie ===
Issues #6 through #11 are each devoted to a single character, providing information about their histories and their motivations in the present: Dash arrests Diesel and has a strange conversation with Catcher, who reveals that he knows Dash is FBI. Red Crow also has an encounter with Catcher, as a result of which Diesel, who has ransacked Red Crow's office and murdered his dogs, escapes; Red Crow also learns that Johnny Tongue's gang whose money helped build the casino has sent "Mr. Brass". Diesel's background is explored, especially his desire to be treated as an Indian despite his blond hair and white appearance; in the end, it is revealed that Diesel is the other FBI agent and that he has stolen two the scalps of FBI Agent Steve L. Berntson and Robert M. Bayer from Red Crow for Nitz. Catcher has a long conversation with Granny about his need to speak with Gina. It is also shown that he can see other people's animal totems, such as Red Crow's elk totem, Dash's spider totem, Granny's bear totem, and his own owl totem (this is summed up by Granny Poor Bear saying that "Just cause you got drunk and started seeing things Catcher ain't mean you can see peoples spirit totems"). Catcher calls Gina but has a terrifying vision before he can say anything to her. Dino's homelife is shown, along with his desire to leave the reservation; while cleaning up Diesel's vandalism at the casino, he gains the sympathy of Red Crow, who gives him money. Gina's actions in 1975 are explored, as well as her conversation with Belcourt at his prison; at the end of her issue, her body is discovered by Dino and his friends.

=== Dreaming Himself into the Real World ===
In the single-issue storyline "Dreaming Himself into the Real World", Dash, an FBI agent, confronts his fears of being discovered while exploring his hidden Indian heritage. Through a transformative dream, guided by his deceased mother, Dash journeys through significant moments in Lakota history, inspiring him to embrace his cultural identity and face his fears. This exploration leads Dash to a newfound sense of purpose and self-acceptance as he integrates his FBI career with his Indian heritage.

=== Dead Mothers ===
Issues #13 through #17: after raiding a meth house, Dash assumes control of a homicide investigation after discovering Diesel strangled an addict as her children slept in the next room. Red Crow, filled with grief and anger over Gina's murder, finds his affairs complicated with the arrival of Mr. Brass, a ruthless enforcer sent by gang leader Johnny Tongue to purge the reservation of perceived threats to the casino.

Dash is informed of his mother's death and chooses instead to focus on the deceased addict's homicide case, in the process playing surrogate father to her eldest teenage son Shelton, taking him camping and teaching him to shoot. Mr. Brass tortures Dash's witness and learns Diesel's location, which he provides to an incredulous Dash. Dash canvases White Haven, Nebraska, where he is rebuffed by Sheriff Wooster Karnow, the corrupt law enforcement official ruling over White Haven.

As the investigation seemingly hits a dead end, Dash sends Shelton to live with his relatives in Canada. During a routine traffic stop, Dash discovers the occupants of the car have sold Shelton a firearm and offered directions to Nebraska. Dash arrives at a trailer park to find Shelton dead from gunshot wounds, his killer Diesel already in Sheriff Karnow's custody.

Realizing he is the only person interested in discovering Gina Bad Horse's murderer, Red Crow approaches Officer Falls Down and asks him to conduct an independent investigation. Burdened by Shelton's death, Dash instigates a bar fight and drunkenly stumbles down the road, arriving at his deceased mother's home. Overwhelmed by guilt and the loss of his mother, Dash breaks down, and spends the night in his old bedroom.

=== The Gravel in Your Guts ===
Dino Poor Bear, finally able to afford the necessary automotive parts, takes his partially restored Camaro on the highway and is promptly pulled over by the corrupt Reservation Police, who task him with delivering a package over state lines to a meth dealer. Upon arriving at his destination, Dino is surprised when the dealer offers him a regular job making illicit deliveries.

Red Crow is approached by Grandma Poor Bear, who gives him Gina's soul bundle. Per Lakota tradition, the guardian of the bundle must maintain a harmonious life for a year, to properly purify the soul in the bundle to allow it to travel the spirit path. This task proves challenging to Red Crow, prompting him to abstain from his typical criminal dealings while also forcing him to remember his turbulent past with Gina and the sins and evils he has perpetrated on the journey to opening his casino.

Mr. Brass, classifying the Reservation occupants as inferior animals, treats them as such, routinely torturing or murdering Red Crow's employees for dealing drugs, weapons, and various other minor crimes whose prosecution could lead to an investigation into the casino. One night, Brass and his bodyguards follow a pair of corrupt Reservation police into a bar, killing them and cornering their delivery boy, Dino Poor Bear, gouging out his eye to punish him for his crimes. Red Crow, who refused to deal with Brass because of his pledge to Gina's soul bundle, whispers a heartfelt apology to it before entering the bar, killing both of Brass's bodyguards and arresting Brass.

With Brass in jail and Dino in the hospital, Red Crow returns the soul bundle to Grandma Poor Bear.

=== High Lonesome ===
Wesley Willeford, a career con-artist and robber, arrives at the Prairie Rose Reservation to count cards, having squandered his career earnings and opportunities following his expulsion from most major casinos. Bemoaning his lack of luck and dire financial straits, he recognizes Dashiel Bad Horse as the FBI Agent who busted him years ago in Alabama. Assembling his old crew, Willeford threatens to reveal Dash's FBI undercover status to Red Crow unless he helps them rob the casino. The robbery goes awry and Dash tracks down and murders the robbers. Returning to Carol's apartment and on the verge of a meltdown, Dash reveals to her that he is an undercover FBI agent.

Diesel's past is revealed as a childhood of broken dreams, an absent mother, an alcoholic father and a constant struggle with his racial identity, ultimately leading him to orchestrate his abusive father's death at the hands of several Indian thugs. Baylis Earl Nitz's motivations are revealed as loyalty to the two deceased FBI agents Bayer and Berntson, both of whom were shot and scalped on reservation land, and whom Nitz vowed to avenge by pursuing and convicting their murderers. Officer Falls Down continues his investigation into Gina Bad Horse's homicide, which he believes is connected to the death of Bayer and Berntson. In prison, Lawrence Belcourt, a close friend of Gina convicted for Bayer and Berntson's murders, reflects on the events that day, revealing the murderer of the FBI agents to be Catcher.

At Gina's grave, Catcher apologizes for murdering her, promising to save her son and help him lead the Lakota people.

=== The Gnawing ===
In White Haven, Sheriff Karnow refuses to transfer Diesel into Bad Horse's custody, instead giving him Catcher, drunk from the night before. On their ride back to Prairie Rose, Catcher prophesizes Bad Horse as a Lakota warrior meant to save the reservation, and offers his assistance. At the Tribal Police Station, as Mr. Brass sits in his cell, Red Crow tasks Bad Horse with finding the undercover FBI Agent on his reservation, not realizing it is Bad Horse. Johnny Tongue, livid with the imprisonment of Mr. Brass, threatens Red Crow, who in turn shoots Mr. Brass and hangs up on Johnny Tongue. Unbeknownst to Red Crow at the time is Ben White Elk, a local dealer in the next cell who witnessed the shooting, a loose end Shunka vows to fix later.

Johnny Tongue, driven by rage, assembles his gang and begins the long drive to Prairie Rose. Hearing about the witness to Mr. Brass's death, Agent Nitz orders Bad Horse to keep White Elk alive so Nitz can take him into custody. In the restroom, White Elk recognizes Bad Horse as one of his customers, and threatens to tell Red Crow about his heroin habit if he doesn't help him escape. Bad Horse helps White Elk out of the station, but loses custody of him when he escapes. The lone witness now missing, both Nitz and Red Crow call in reinforcements and begin a statewide manhunt.

At Nitz's headquarters, Bad Horse learns from Agent Newsome that Diesel will be transferred to a mental facility for imprisonment, a revelation he passes to a livid Diesel. In White Haven, Bad Horse finds Catcher and asks a favor. As the FBI narrows their search to the mountains, White Elk is horrified when Shunka finds him first. Held at knifepoint and ready to reveal who helped him escape, White Elk is abruptly shot from a distance. The gunman, Catcher, escapes detection. As Agent Newsome drives Diesel to his destination, Diesel kills him and pulls onto the side of the road to meet Bad Horse in the brush. At the Tribal Police Station, Johnny Tongue and his men arrive, as Red Crow appears, alone and unarmed. He offers no resistance as Johnny Tongue fiercely beats him.

As Bad Horse and Diesel travel deeper into the brush, Bad Horse wounds Diesel with a gunshot, disarms him and calmly yet slowly murders him with tens of bullets, revenge for killing the young boy. At the Tribal Police Station, Red Crow is bandaged, his beating over and Johnny Tongue and his men gone, having inflicted their punishment for Red Crow's insubordination. Falls Down enters Catcher's residence where he discovers physical evidence confirming him to be Gina's murderer, just as Catcher knocks him out. Johnny Tongue returns to his penthouse to find everyone dead. From the shadows, Red Crow and Shunka, who rode their helicopter ahead of Tongue's motorcade, murder Tongue and his men.

At Prairie Rose, Bad Horse offers Red Crow photographs of Diesel's corpse and reveals him as the undercover FBI Agent, an assertion that Red Crow's intelligence backs up.

In the hospital, Carol discovers she is pregnant with Bad Horse's child.

=== Rez Blues ===
A look is given into the histories of both Carol Ellroy's history back to when her mother, Claudine, tried two times self-abort her and Red Crow convincing her not to, but after an unknown amount of time Claudine leaves both Red Crow and Carol. It is also revealed that Gina Bad Horse, Dashiell's mother, aborted a child a few years after Dashiell was born and shows her leaving Dashiell's father immediately after leaving the abortion clinic. It also shows Carol contemplating suicide before Granny Poor Bear tells her that having a baby is a good thing and also convinces her to join a rehabilitation clinic and move in with her. Carol joins the rehab center and burns down her own house. Parallel to these events Dashiell is kidnapped by Red Crow, wanting to make Dashiell detox, takes him and leaves him in a tent where he hallucinates and wanders to his mother's grave. Before this Dashiell's father Wade comes to the Rez, apparently on account of Gina's funeral. Wade rescues Dashiell from the cold and brings him to the hospital. Later Wade tells Dashiell that his real purpose of coming back was to catch Gina's killer. Carol and Dashiell meet and both think of revealing every thing (Dasheill that he is in love with her and Carol that she is pregnant) but they don't and agree not to meet up later. The next day Carol aborts her child while Dashiell waits where he had agreed with Wade to meet but on the way there Wade is stopped by Agent Nitz who doesn't want Dashiell and Wade to meet. Wade soon realizes that Dashiell is an undercover federal agent. Carol reveals to Granny Poor Bear that she didn't keep the baby and Granny takes her under her wing and trains to care for her house after she dies. The story arc completes with Dashiell sitting near his mother grave.

== Characters ==
Dashiell "Dash" Bad Horse (Lakota: Sunkawakan Sica), a.k.a. Dashiell Bradford, is a full-blooded Oglala Lakota who left the Prairie Rose Indian Reservation at the age of thirteen before returning with a vengeance in 2007. Although happy to have left the reservation, he resents his mother for sending him away, believing she chose activist causes over the welfare of her only child. The fifteen years in between were spent on contact sports, learning Jeet Kune Do and Boxing, and serving with the U.S. Army in the Kosovo War before becoming an FBI agent. A fiery brawler that taps into his anger during fights, he has defeated hordes of enemies at a time, but is not the sort of man to kill in cold blood. He shaves his head and wears several earrings. His cold, withdrawn, anti-social demeanor contrasts with his propensity to start fights with little provocation or reason. Described by FBI Special Agent Baylis Nitz as a "borderline sociopath", his motivation for returning to the reservation is at first unknown, but later revealed to be legal troubles which Nitz has promised to erase if Dashiell successfully completes his mission.

IGN ranked Dashiell Bad Horse as the 62nd greatest comic book hero of all time stating "that Bad Horse shows us how dark you can go with an anti-hero to still make us root for him".

Chief Lincoln Red Crow (Lakota: Kangi Sa), a.k.a. John Rayfield Bustill, is a bullish Lakota elder in his fifties. Red Crow's professional demeanor conceals a cold determination to elevate his Reservation beyond their dire surroundings, no matter the cost. A "big man" on the reservation with fingers in many pies, he is President of the Oglala Tribal Council, Sheriff of the Tribal Police Force and managing director of the Crazy Horse, his chief project since leaving the Native American Rights movement. The need to balance feuding parties with conflicting interests, as well as raising the necessary funds, has led him into a position of a local crime lord, managing his interests in drugs, prostitution and arms dealing. Publicly and privately, Red Crow is not shy about drawing attention to the overwhelming problems of the reservation, or his efforts to reduce them, statements dismissed by his critics who claim he's merely a mob boss presiding over a criminal empire feeding off the reservation.

Red Crow has unresolved romantic feelings for Gina Bad Horse, with whom he shares a history during their times as militant Native American rights activists. His estranged daughter Carol refuses to speak to him civilly, and he becomes concerned with Dashiell's obsession with her. As the series continues, his attempts at redemption are met with mixed results, idealism clashing against the cold reality of life on the Rez.

Gina Bad Horse is Dashiell's estranged mother, and a longtime activist pushing for the rights of Native Americans. With Lincoln Red Crow and Lawrence Belcourt, she participated in the ambush and murder of two FBI agents who entered the reservation one night in 1975. While she initially held the wounded agents under the gun, Red Crow took the pistol from her and was hinted to have executed them himself initially, saying that she didn't want to have the killing on her conscience. In the present time, she and her band of protesters now oppose Red Crow's plans to open the casino. Her murder drives much of the plot of the series, as it touches the lives not only of Dash and Red Crow, but of Belcourt, Catcher, Nitz, and Wade.

Britt "Diesel" Fillenworth is Gina Bad Horse's boyfriend/companion, a skilled hand-to-hand combatant, with a reputation for violence and erratic, near-sociopathic behavior. It is often remarked (generally contemptuously) that he is white, although he reacts badly to this, claiming to be 1/16 West Texas Kickapoo. In Gina's absence, he breaks into Red Crow's office at the casino, steals something critical (which he later hands off to FBI agent Nitz), trashes the office and kills Red Crow's dogs. After a long, drawn-out fight with Dashiell he is arrested, only to escape before Red Crow and his men can take any action against him. He lived with his abusive father until he decided he wasn't going to take it anymore and set up his father to be robbed and killed. The items he stole from Red Crow have recently been revealed to be the scalps of the two murdered FBI agents. Diesel is eventually released from jail by Nitz, who plans to have him eliminated under the guise of being taken to a safehouse. Informed of this plan by Dash, he kills Nitz's assistant Newsome before being himself killed by Dash.

FBI SAC Baylis Earl Nitz is a vengeful, unscrupulous and amoral FBI agent who was present at Dashiell's birth and had had his eye on him for some time, insisting that he be made an FBI Field Agent when it seemed his mother's record would prevent that. He is driven by a desire to see Red Crow behind bars for murder, something that has eluded him since the seventies when Red Crow and Gina got away scot free from the murder of two FBI Agents. He will do anything to get what he wants, even if it means sacrificing Dashiell. He left the two scalps of the murdered agents on their graves, rather than using them as evidence (which may have been impossible anyway, since he obtained them illegally). After his agents Newsome and Diesel are killed, he is relieved of duty, only to be restored to duty after he accidentally wipes out an entire gang of Jordanian terrorists. Given a new set of team members, he returns to his quest to take down Red Crow.

Carol Ellroy (née Red Crow) is married to someone called Ellroy, but she doesn't much care about the fact. She probably married him (a non-Indian) just to spite her father. Pretty much exactly Dashiell's age, the two shared their first erotic experience at the age of thirteen, when she let him watch her urinate. When Dashiell has returned, he is repelled by her promiscuity yet attracted by her beauty. It is unclear whether she is a femme fatale or a damsel in distress. She and Dash become lovers, and she gets him hooked on drugs. When he tells her he is FBI agent, she kicks him out. She eventually learns that she is pregnant with Dash's child, and tries to start a new life with Granny. Eventually she decides to abort the baby without ever telling Dash about the pregnancy. Still, Granny wants her to take her place as the reservation healer. She also forms a friendship with Dino, although her continued feelings for Dash prevent for recognizing Dino as a potential love interest.

Dino Poor Bear is a young man struggling to make a living on the reservation. He encounters Dashiell at a meth lab which Dashiell is shutting down. Poor Bear wants a better life for himself and his daughter, and would like to leave the reservation. He works as a janitor for the Crazy Horse casino and eventually gets money from Red Crow to fix up his car. He is eventually pressed back into a life of crime as a drug-delivery boy. When Carol moves in with him and Granny, he begins to think that she could be his girlfriend; he even turns in his friends after discovering they are responsible for the hit-and-run death of a reservation girl. He uses the reward money to buy Carol a pair of earrings she liked, but when she continues to talk about her feelings for Dash, he tosses the earrings. It is implied by Catcher that Dino will be taking a dark and violent path.

Arthur J. "Catcher" Pendergrass, born 1952 in West Chester, Pennsylvania, was a man of Red Crow's generation; he was present when the federal agents died, but he has never said a word about his role in the murders. Upon seeing Gina, whom he had loved his entire life, kiss Red Crow passionately he snaps and kills the two agents, who were being held at gunpoint. Years later, when confronted by an angry Gina, he kills and scalps her, possibly to prevent being turned in for the crime. He makes up for it by talking to himself (or, rather, his horse named Festus) as present events progress, providing us with a running commentary. His reactions to other characters are particularly insightful, as he believes he can see their spirit animals. His own totem is an owl. When Officer Falls Down realizes his guilt, he kidnaps him and puts him through a tortuous "spiritual" test, which Falls Down passes with the help of Gina's spirit. Catcher then visits Dash and gives him the choice to save Officer Falls Down or find Gina's killer; Catcher hopes Dash will choose well, but Dash chooses to find the killer, and does not realize from Catcher's words that Catcher is himself the killer. Catcher shoots at Dash in the truck, but just at that moment Dash swerves to avoid hitting Officer Falls Down (still handcuffed and blindfolded and stumbling through the woods); Dash and Cather shoot at each other. Catcher escapes, while Dash and Officer Falls Down find Festus and get back to the reservation.

Uday "Shunka" Sartana is a chief Red Crow's bodyguard and closest associate. In a two-part arc focusing on Shunka, it is revealed that he is a closeted homosexual who has to deal with widespread homophobia in his line of work, including from Red Crow himself. Shunka is distrustful of Dash and their rivalry heats up as the series progresses. Though he is always referred to his nickname, which is "dog" in Lakota, his mostly unknown real name suggests he was born elsewhere. He is revealed to be in love with Red Crow when he kisses him just as Red Crow exiles him from the Rez. He immediately confronts Dash after leaving the rez and despite winning the confrontation, he is killed by an arriving Red Crow, but not before confessing his love for him.

Officer Franklin Falls Down is the single straight cop on the rez. He was assigned to cover Gina's murder and may be getting more information than he expected as he begins to investigate. His wife, Sherry, was killed in a car accident by Parker Louvin, a notorious alcoholic on the rez. He talks with Belcourt and eventually finds Catcher's trailer, where he realizes Catcher is the killer. Catcher kidnaps him and puts him through a tortuous trial, which Falls Down passes with the help of Gina's spirit.

Agnes "Granny" Poor Bear (Iyotiyemato): The eldest of the Poor Bear family, this old woman seems to be the only source of true guidance on the Rez. Skilled in the old medicine, she offers spiritual counseling to many of the characters. Though she has no biological children of her own, she has fostered several, and continues to take care of the Poor Bear family. Her totem is a huge bear, one of the very few "strong" totems that have been revealed. She has taken Carol in to her home, and has asked her to be her successor on the reservation.

Dog Soldier Society was a Native American activist group on the Oglala Reservation in the 1970s. Named after the famous warriors of Crazy Horse, they fought the Federal government for the rights of the indigenous people of America. Members included Lincoln Red Crow, Gina Bad Horse, Catcher, Lawrence Belcourt, and Reginald Standing Rock.

Reginald Standing Rock is one of the activists on the rez back in the day, he was suspected of being an informant for the FBI. Red Crow confronted him alone and although Reggie didn't confirm his status, he didn't deny it. Standing Rock was Red Crow's first murder victim - he choked Standing Rock for 11 minutes. Standing Rock's status as an informant is debated still by members of the Rez, including his wife, who denies it. It is later revealed that Gina's husband (Dash's father) Wade was the FBI agent, although no one else in the story knows this.

Lawrence Belcourt is a Dog Soldier who was present the night the two FBI agents were murdered. Although Belcourt barely participated, he was convicted of the crime when others were acquitted. He is serving life in a Federal prison, where he is under the protection of an African-American prison gang. Red Crow pays for this service until Belcourt tells him about his last conversation with Gina and tells him he no longer needs his protection. Belcourt physically resemble Leonard Pelltier.

Phuong Yii Brass is a member of the Hmong's criminal organization sent by Johnny Tongue to ensure the security of his investment, the Crazy Horse Casino. He is an older man with visible scars and missing his left arm. He does not like to ask questions twice and punishes his captives through extreme torture. He is a sadist who is not a stranger to using murder or rape to get what he wants. He was incarcerated by Red Crow as a hostage, until Red Crow assassinated him as a way of getting back at the Hmongs.

Johnny Tongue is the leader of a predominantly Hmong crime syndicate in Minneapolis/St. Paul who was an illicit investor in Lincoln Red Crow's business ventures in Prairie Rose, including the casino. Johnny sends his most vicious enforcer, Mr. Brass, to assert dominance over Red Crow and his operations and shape up his associates. Bristling at the interference, and revolted by Mr. Brass' revealed bloodlust and perversions, Red Crow eventually murders Brass, starting a war between his and Johnny Tongue's crews. After an apparent victory and assertion of dominance over Red Crow, Tongue and his crew are ambushed and murdered by Red Crow and Shunka.

Sheriff Wooster T. Karnow is the sheriff of neighboring White Haven, Nebraska. He claims to have played for the Cornhuskers and been a member of a special forces group but has a propensity for gross exaggeration. Karnow doesn't care about the methamphetamine being run out the rez so long as it doesn't affect his liquor sales. After a U.S. Marshal demonstrates Karnow's incompetence, Karnow begins to crack down on Red Crow's criminal side activities.

Wesley Willeford is an African American con man and card counter who used many aliases. He was taking down Red Crow's casino when he was spotted and thrown out. As he was leaving, he recognized Dashiell as an FBI agent — Dashiell once busted him — and blackmailed him into helping set up the casino for a robbery. The robbery went bad and Willeford died, along with the other members of the gang he put together for the robbery. Before setting up the robbery, Willeford murdered an Indian stripper to conceal his identity. Falls Down is researching that murder, too. Willeford accidentally dies of an overdose after being stuck with a needle of poisoned drugs intended for Dash.

Wade Rouleau is Dash's father, whom Gina kicked out during Dash's childhood but who returns when he hears of Gina's death. Wade is shown to have miraculously survived numerous deadly scrapes in Vietnam, and for that reason he was recruited by two of his war colleagues to be the FBI's mole in the Dog Soldiers. Dash brushes off Wade's return to the reservation, but agrees to work with him to discover the identity of Gina's murderer. Before they can meet, Wade is picked up by Nitz and imprisoned on false pretenses in order to keep him away from Dash. He is locked up in the same cell with Catcher and is strangled by him to death in self-defence after learning Catcher was indeed the killer he was looking for.

== Reception ==
Scalped has been met with near-universal praise throughout its run. Comic Book Resources referred to it as "one of the few comics capable of evoking real, visceral emotion from the reader", and Newsarama called the final issue an "awe inspiring conclusion" and gave the issue a score of 10 out of 10.

== Collected editions ==
Scalped has been collected into the following trade paperbacks:

Scalped trade paperbacks
#	Title	ISBN	Release date	Collected material
1	Indian Country	ISBN 1-4012-1317-0	August 2007	Scalped #1–5
2	Casino Boogie	ISBN 1-4012-1654-4	February 2008	Scalped #6–11
3	Dead Mothers	ISBN 1-4012-1919-5	October 2008	Scalped #12–18
4	The Gravel in Your Guts	ISBN 1-4012-2179-3	April 2009	Scalped #19–24
5	High Lonesome	ISBN 1-4012-2487-3	October 2009	Scalped #25–29
6	The Gnawing	ISBN 1-4012-2717-1	May 2010	Scalped #30–34
7	Rez Blues	ISBN 1-4012-3019-9	March 2011	Scalped #35–42
8	You Gotta Sin to Get Saved	ISBN 1-4012-3288-4	November 2011	Scalped #43–49
9	Knuckle Up	ISBN 1-4012-3505-0	July 2012	Scalped #50–55
10	Trail's End	ISBN 1-7811-6489-4	November 2012	Scalped #56–60

Scalped has also been released in deluxe editions:

Scalped Deluxe Editions
#	Title	Collected material	Release date	Type	ISBN
1	Scalped Deluxe Edition Book One	#1–11	February 18, 2015	Hardcover	ISBN 1-4012-5091-2
1	Scalped Deluxe Edition Book One	#1–11	July 19, 2017	Paperback	ISBN 1-4012-7126-X
2	Scalped Deluxe Edition Book Two	#12–24	August 26, 2015	Hardcover	ISBN 1-4012-5425-X
2	Scalped Deluxe Edition Book Two	#12–24	March 14, 2018	Paperback	ISBN 1-4012-7786-1
3	Scalped Deluxe Edition Book Three	#25–34	December 23, 2015	Hardcover	ISBN 1-4012-5858-1
3	Scalped Deluxe Edition Book Three	#25–34	August 15, 2018	Paperback	ISBN 1-4012-8156-7
4	Scalped Deluxe Edition Book Four	#35–49	April 13, 2016	Hardcover	ISBN 1-4012-6144-2
4	Scalped Deluxe Edition Book Four	#35–49	Cancelled	Paperback	
5	Scalped Deluxe Edition Book Five	#50–60	August 3, 2016	Hardcover	ISBN 1-4012-6363-1
5	Scalped Deluxe Edition Book Five	#50–60	Cancelled	Paperback	

== Adaptation ==
Warner Horizon and DC Entertainment were developing for WGN America a live action Scalped TV pilot with Doug Jung writing and executive producing the series. Although the pilot was filmed in New Mexico in early April 2017, WGN decided to pass on the series in November after they saw the pilot episode.
