= Ron Garney =

Comic book artist

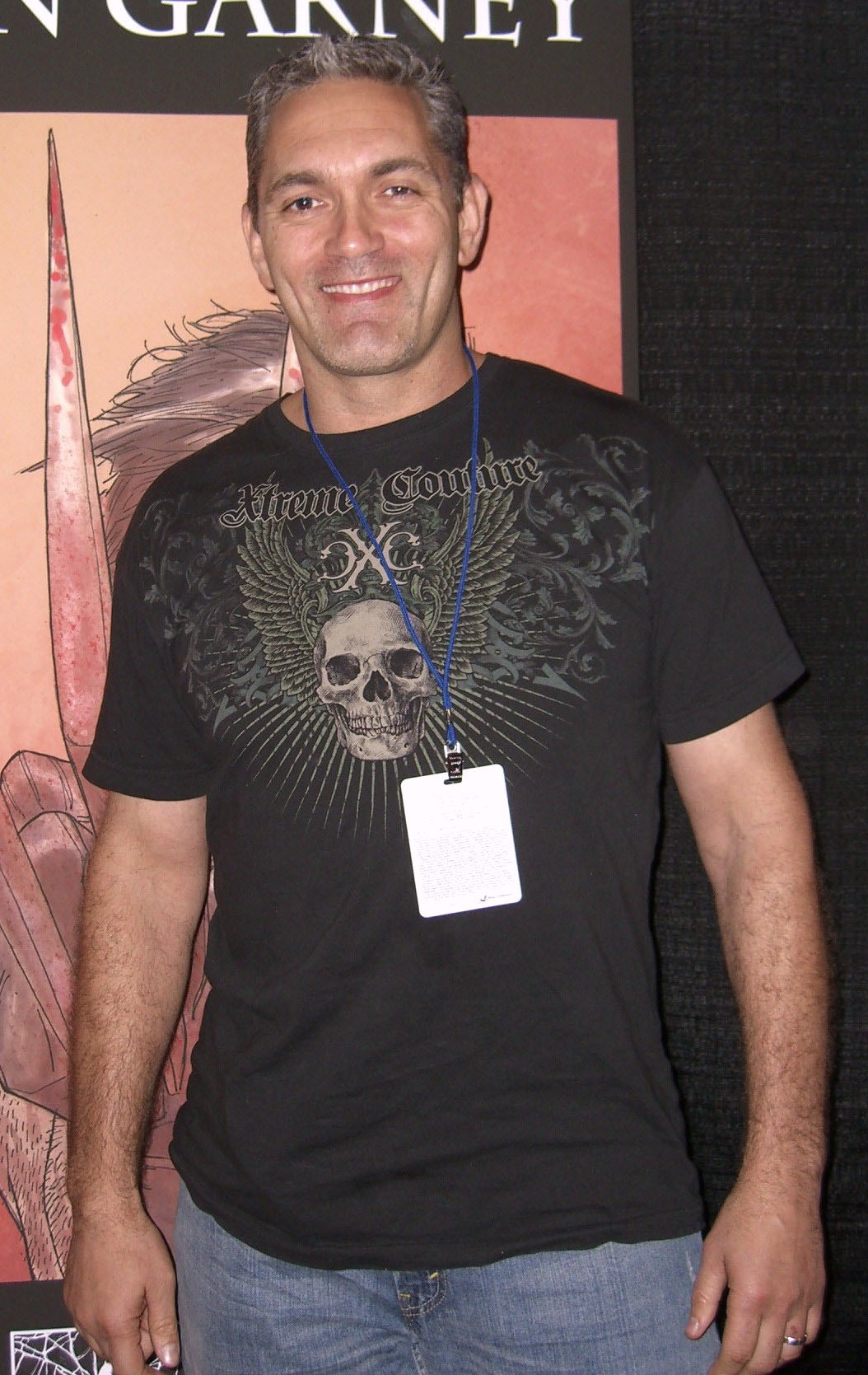
- Garney at the New York Comic Con in Manhattan, October 9, 2010
- Areas: Penciller, Writer
- Notable works: JLA; The Amazing Spider-Man; Hulk; Daredevil; Silver Surfer; Captain America

Ron Garney is an American comic book writer/artist, known for his work on books such as JLA, The Amazing Spider-Man, Silver Surfer, Hulk, Daredevil and Captain America.

== Career ==
Garney has worked on JLA, The Amazing Spider-Man, Daredevil, Ghost Rider volume 3, Wolverine, Captain America, X-Men, Silver Surfer and Hulk. He has also written for Hulk in collaboration with Jerry Ordway.

Garney's late 2000s projects include Skaar: Son of Hulk and Wolverine: Weapon X. Garney worked as the Costume illustrator on the 2007 Will Smith film I Am Legend, and the 2010 Nicolas Cage fantasy film, The Sorcerer's Apprentice.

== Bibliography ==
=== As artist ===
==== Interior pencil work ====
- G.I. Joe: A Real American Hero #110, 117 (Marvel Comics, 1991)
- Marc Spector: Moon Knight #26-33, 35-38 (Marvel Comics, 1991–92)
- Daredevil #296, 304, Annual #7 (Marvel Comics, 1991–92)
- Nightstalkers #1-8 (Marvel Comics, 1992–93)
- Morbius, the Living Vampire #4 (Marvel Comics, 1992)
- Ghost Rider vol. 3 #39-50, 52 (Marvel Comics, 1993–94)
- Wolverine vol. 2 #86 (Marvel Comics, 1994)
- Ghost Rider, Wolverine, Punisher: The Dark Design (Marvel Comics, 1994)
- Uncanny X-Men #321 (Marvel Comics, 1995)
- X-Men vol. 2 #41 (Marvel Comics, 1995)
- Spider-Man Unlimited #9, 14 (Marvel Comics, 1995–06)
- Captain America #444-454 (Marvel Comics, 1995–96)
- Captain America: The Legend (Marvel Comics, 1996)
- The Amazing Spider-Man #416-417 (Marvel Comics, 1996)
- Silver Surfer, vol. 3 #123, 125–129, -1, 131, (Marvel Comics, 1996–97)
- Captain America, vol. 3 #1-5, 12 (Marvel Comics, 1998)
- Captain America: Sentinel of Liberty #1-6 (Marvel Comics, 1998)
- Hulk #1-4, 6–9, 11–20, (Marvel Comics, 1999–2000)
- JLA: Our Worlds at War #1 (DC Comics, 2001)
- Uncanny X-Men #401-402, 410–412, 421–424, 435-436 (Marvel Comics, 2002–04)
- JLA #101-114 (DC Comics, 2004–05)
- Green Arrow vol. 3 #55-57 (DC Comics, 2005–06)
- The Amazing Spider-Man #529, 532-543 (Marvel Comics, 2006–07)
- Wolverine vol. 3 #62-65 (Marvel Comics, 2008)
- Skaar: Son of Hulk #1-6 (Marvel Comics, 2008)
- Wolverine: Weapon X #1-5, 11-15 (Marvel Comics, 2009–10)
- Ultimate Captain America #1-4 (Marvel Comics, 2011)
- Daken: The Dark Wolverine #9.1 (Marvel Comics, 2011)
- Wolverine vol. 4 #17-19, 300, 304 (Marvel Comics, 2011–12)
- Fantastic Four #605-606 (Marvel Comics, 2012)
- Ultimate Comics: The Ultimates #12 (Marvel Comics, 2012)
- Uncanny X-Men vol. 2 #18 (Marvel Comics, 2012)
- A+X #1 (Marvel Comics, 2012)
- Uncanny X-Force vol. 2 #1-4 (Marvel Comics, 2013)
- Thor: God of Thunder #13-17 (Marvel Comics, 2013–14)
- Men of Wrath #1-5 (Icon, 2014–15)
- Age of Ultron vs. Marvel Zombies #1 (Marvel Comics, 2015)
- Daredevil vol. 5 #1-5, 10–14, 17–18, 20, 26–28, 598-600 (Marvel Comics, 2015–18)
- Astonishing X-Men vol. 4 #11 (Marvel Comics, 2018)
- Savage Sword of Conan vol. 2 #1-5 (Marvel Comics, 2019)
- War of the Realms Omega (Marvel Comics, 2019)
- Marvel Comics #1000 (Marvel Comics, 2019)
- Savage Avengers Annual 1 (Marvel Comics, 2019)
- Fantastic Four: Grimm Noir One-Shot (Marvel Comics, 2020)
- Juggernaut vol. 3 #1-5 (Marvel Comics, 2021)
- BRZRKR #1–12 (Boom Studios 2021-2023)

=== As inker ===
- Fantastic Four #605
- Wolverine: Weapon X vol. 1 #4, #5
- Daken: Dark Wolverine vol. 1 #9.1
- Wolverine vol. 2 #300, vol. 3 #62

=== Covers ===
- New Avengers vol. 2 #29
- Fantastic Four vol. 1 #19, #605, #606
- The Incredible Hulk vol. 2 #13, #16, vol. 3 #13
- The Amazing Spider-Man vol. 1 #416, 417, 530–540,
- What if?: Spider-Man Back in Black
- Uncanny X-Force #18, #19
- Uncanny X-Men vol. 1 #401, 402, 410, 411, 443
- Wolverine/X-Force vol. 1 #1, 12
- Captain America vol. 3 #1, 454, 446, 447, 448, 452, 453
- Wolverine vol. 3 #65 vol. 4 #19, 62
- Silver Surfer #123
- Ghost Rider vol. 3 #49

=== As writer ===
- Captain America: Sentinel of Liberty #1-4
- Hulk vol. 1 #9, #10

Preceded by John Byrne	(Incredible) Hulk writer 1999–2000 (with Jerry Ordway)	Succeeded by Paul Jenkins
Preceded by Mike Deodato	The Amazing Spider-Man artist 2006–2007	Succeeded by Joe Quesada
