= Wolverine: Weapon X =

Comic book series

- Cover to Wolverine: Weapon X #1. Art by Ron Garney.

Publication information
- Publisher: Marvel Comics
- Schedule: Monthly
- Format: Ongoing series
- Genre: Superhero
- Publication date: June 2009 – October 2010
- No. of issues: 16
- Main character: Wolverine

Creative team
- Written by: Jason Aaron
- Artist: Ron Garney
- Colorist: Jason Keith

Collected editions
- Volume 1: The Adamantium Men: ISBN 978-0-7851-4017-7

Wolverine: Weapon X is a 2009 comic book series published by Marvel Comics starring the superhero Wolverine. The series was written by Jason Aaron, writing his first ongoing series starring Wolverine after writing several one-shots and limited series featuring the Marvel mainstay character. The series lasted sixteen issues.

== Publication history ==
While Weapon X is not published under Marvel's MAX imprint of Marvel, writer Jason Aaron has stated his intent to differ this title from the more mainstream Marvel series in which Wolverine is regularly featured.

In an interview, Aaron explained, "Basically, I'm approaching this like Garth Ennis did the Punisher MAX series. Obviously, this won't be a MAX book in terms of content, but we will see arcs that are stand-alone and feature lots of new characters and new villains. We'll really be working to establish our own continuity, instead of mining Logan's past. Daniel Way is already doing a great job of dealing with the ins and outs of Logan's history over in Wolverine: Origins, so I want to focus on telling new stories for people who maybe aren't as familiar with Wolverine continuity. We'll still be dealing with his past at times, just like how the first arc involves the legacy of Weapon X, but in a way that's still easily accessible."

Aaron also indicated that the series would not tie into the ongoing events of the Marvel Universe, such as "Dark Reign" storyline at least at first: "You'll see plenty of references to the big events of the Marvel U in these pages, but at least initially, you won't see us doing any crossovers or tie-ins...Again, I want this to be a series that anybody can step right into and enjoy, regardless of how many Wolverine comics they've read before."

== Plot summary ==
=== The Adamantium Men (Issues #1–5) ===
The first arc deals with a private security organization called Blackguard obtaining files on the Weapon X procedure that transformed James Howlett into Wolverine. It leads into a tale of corporate espionage, with Wolverine attempting to single-handedly dismantle the organization trying to create their own versions of Weapon X soldiers, featuring artificially-enhanced senses, strength, agility, reflexes, stamina, an accelerated-healing factor, laser claws and adamantium-laced skeletons.

=== Insane in the Brain (Issues #6–9) ===
The second arc features Wolverine awaking in a mental asylum, where it is quickly realized that a psychopath is passing himself off as a psychiatrist to perform twisted experiments on inmates that he has captured and is keeping against their will. Wolverine, an apparent amnesiac, is having nightmares of his life as Wolverine as the "doctor" tries to reawaken the beast within Logan.

=== Love and the Wolverine (Issue #10) ===
An interlude story featuring a large cameo cast, as Wolverine comes to terms with falling in love again, despite the fact everyone he's ever loved before has either died or been killed as a result of his violent lifestyle.

=== Tomorrow Dies Today (Issues #11–15) ===
The third arc of the series features Wolverine teaming up with Captain America to fight a new generation of the killer cyborgs: Deathlok.

=== The End of the Beginning (Issue #16) ===
An independent closing tale for the series, where Wolverine deals with the death of his friend and fellow X-Man, Kurt Wagner (Nightcrawler). Wolverine has to fulfill Nightcrawler's last request to him, and while doing so, remembers some of the interactions they had over the years.

== Reception ==
Reviewers IGN gave a positive review to the series' first two issues.

== Collected editions ==
This series has been collected in individual volumes, and included within other collections:

Title	Material Collected	ISBN
Volume 1: The Adamantium Men	Wolverine: Weapon X #1–5, Wolverine, vol. 3 #73–74	Premium Hardcover: ISBN 978-0-7851-4017-7
Volume 2: Insane in the Brain	Wolverine: Weapon X #6–10	Premium Hardcover: ISBN 978-0-7851-4018-4
Volume 3: Tomorrow Dies Today	Wolverine: Weapon X #11–16, Dark Reign: The List - Wolverine (one-shot)	Premium Hardcover: ISBN 978-0-7851-4650-6
Wolverine by Jason Aaron: The Complete Collection 1	Wolverine (vol. 3) #56, 62–65; material from #73–74; Wolverine: Manifest Destiny 1–4; Wolverine: Weapon X 1–5; material from Wolverine (vol. 2) #175	978-0785185413
Wolverine by Jason Aaron: The Complete Collection 2	Wolverine: Weapon X #6–16; Dark Reign: The List – Wolverine #1; Dark X-Men: The Beginning #3; All-New Wolverine Saga	978-0785185765

== See also ==
- Wolverine (comic book)
