= Flaviano Bucci =

Italian painter (1817–1906)

Flaviano Bucci (December 26, 1817 – July 28, 1906) was an Italian painter.

He was born in Giulianova in the Abruzzo. He trained under Giuseppe Bonolis, and from there went to Naples, where he worked under Teramano. He was a colleague and friend of the painters Palizzi, Smargiassi, and Vianelli. he was not prolific, and among his major works are a Beggar once at the pinacoteca of the Palace of Capodimonte, A flower girl, and many portraits, including Donna Laura his wife, and pastels of the Count of Castellana and his son Andrea. He tended to paint subjects in typical peasant garb of Southern Italy. Among his pupils was Raffaello Pagliaccetti.
