= Punisher Max =

Marvel comic book series

PunisherMAX
- Variant incentive cover to PunisherMAX #1 (January 2010). Cover art by Steve Dillon.

Publication information
- Publisher: Marvel Comics
- Schedule: Monthly
- Format: Ongoing series
- Publication date: January 2010 – February 2012
- No. of issues: 22 issues, plus 1 X-Mas Special
- Main character: Punisher

Creative team
- Written by: Jason Aaron
- Artist: Steve Dillon

PunisherMAX (or Punisher MAX) is the second comic book ongoing series published under the MAX imprint of Marvel Comics featuring vigilante and anti-hero the Punisher. The series was written by Jason Aaron and drawn by Steve Dillon.

Unlike the concurrently running Marvel Universe-proper series featuring the Punisher, the MAX imprint allows the creators the freedom to write more realistic and hard-edged stories that cannot be seen in regular mainline Marvel Universe stories. Also unlike the previous MAX series, which focused mainly on Frank Castle/The Punisher's war against the mob, this series has him squaring off against MAX versions of popular Marvel super villains, such as Wilson Fisk/the Kingpin, Bullseye and Elektra. The series came to a conclusion with issue #22.

The series was a primary influence on Marvel's Netflix television series Daredevil and the second season of its spin-off The Punisher, both set in the Marvel Cinematic Universe (MCU), the former in terms of the characterisation of Vanessa Marianna-Fisk (portrayed by Ayelet Zurer), and the latter in the adaptation of the Mennonite, John Pilgrim (portrayed by Josh Stewart).

== Story arcs ==
=== "Kingpin" (#1–5) ===
Interrogating a mobster, the Punisher discovers a meeting place where many of them will be in the same place. After the meeting with the mob bosses, the men determine that the mythic "Kingpin of Crime" should be fabricated by them in order to throw the Punisher off their trails. One of the bosses' bodyguards, Wilson Fisk, is apparently chosen as this new figurehead. When the Punisher crashes the meeting, Fisk gets the bosses to safety and has a chance to kill the Punisher, which he does not take. He goes home to his wife and sleeping child, when he receives the call that will seat him as the Kingpin. Smiling, hinting at an ulterior motive, he accepts.

=== "Bullseye" (#6–11) ===
Immediately after Wilson Fisk becomes the "Kingpin of Crime", he cancels all of the former bosses' appointments. However, Fisk's secretary calls and informs him that one man refuses to have his appointment cancelled. The man is known only as Bullseye, the world's deadliest assassin. Bullseye never misses his target, and has set his sights on the Punisher.

=== "Frank" (#12–16) ===
After the cruel fight against Bullseye, Frank gets arrested and sent to a high-security prison with a thousand people who want nothing more than to see him dead. Frank reflects back on his time during the war and immediately after returning home, while struggling to understand his Punisher persona and refusing offers from crime bosses. He contemplates a life of peace versus continuing his violent methods.

=== "Homeless" (#17–21) ===
Frank escapes prison and goes into his final confrontation with Wilson Fisk a.k.a. the Kingpin of Crime, and his new bodyguard, Elektra.

=== "War's End" (#22) ===
The series concludes with issue #22, which covers the death, funeral, and burial of Frank Castle. At the end of issue #22, the Punisher's death sparks a public uprising, with citizens purging New York's criminals.

== Reception ==
The series holds an average rating of 8.6 by 85 professional critics on the review aggregation website Comic Book Roundup.

== Prints ==
=== Issues ===
No.	Title	Cover date	Comic Book Roundup rating	Estimated sales (first month)	Rated
#1	Kingpin: Part 1	January 2010	8.2 by five professional critics.	29,106, ranked 67th in North America	
#2	Kingpin: Part 2	February 2010	8.5 by five professional critics.	23,110, ranked 92nd in North America	
#3	Kingpin: Part 3	March 2010	7.8 by four professional critics.	22,887, ranked 87th in North America	
#4	Kingpin: Part 4	April 2010	7.6 by six professional critics.	22,472, ranked 82nd in North America	
#5	Kingpin: Conclusion	May 2010	8.9 by six professional critics.	22,432, ranked 91st in North America	
#6	Bullseye, Part One	June 2010	6.1 by four professional critics.	22,246, ranked 87th in North America	
#7	Bullseye, Part Two	July 2010	8.1 by four professional critics.	22,198, ranked 91st in North America	
#8	Bullseye, Part Three	August 2010	8.2 by two professional critics.	22,053, ranked 93rd in North America	
#9	Bullseye, Part Four	September 2010	8.9 by four professional critics.	21,453, ranked 97th in North America	
#10	Bullseye, Part Five	October 2010	9.1 by three professional critics.	19,236, ranked 93rd in North America	
#11	Bullseye, Conclusion	March 2011	9.2 by five professional critics.	19,243, ranked 107th in North America	
#12	Frank, Part One	April 2011	9.7 by three professional critics.	18,740, ranked 93rd in North America	
#13	Frank, Part Two	May 2011	9.1 by four professional critics.	18,448, ranked 99th in North America	
#14	Frank, Part Three	June 2011	8.5 by seven professional critics.	17,965, ranked 133rd in North America	
#15	Frank, Part Four	July 2011	7.7 by three professional critics.	17,706, ranked 122nd in North America	
#16	Frank, Conclusion	August 2011	7.8 by three professional critics.	17,625, ranked 133rd in North America	
#17	Homeless, Part 1	September 2011	9.5 by one professional critic.	17,540, ranked 122nd in North America	
#18	Homeless, Part Two	October 2011	10.0 by one professional critic.	17,541, ranked 133rd in North America	
#19	Homeless, Part Three	November 2011	8.0 by one professional critic.	17,473, ranked 126th in North America	
#20	Homeless, Part Four	December 2011	8.9 by four professional critics.	17,191, ranked 123rd in North America	
#21	Homeless, Conclusion	January 2012	9.5 by four professional critics.	17,267, ranked 109th in North America	
#22	War's End	February 2012	8.9 by six professional critics.	17,738, ranked 115th in North America	

=== Specials ===
Title	Pages	Release date	Comic Book Roundup rating	Estimated sales (first month)	Rated
Punisher MAX X-Mas Special #1 "And On Earth Peace, Good Will Toward Men"	35	December 3, 2008	7.7 by three critics.	21,242, ranked 129th in North America	EXPLICIT CONTENT

=== Collected editions ===
Title [Tagline]	Format	Material collected	Pages	Publication date	ISBN	Estimated sales (North America)	Note
Punisher MAX vol. 1: Kingpin	Hardcover Trade paperback	PunisherMAX #1-5		August 2010 November 2010	978-0-7851-4596-7 978-0-7851-4071-9		
Punisher MAX vol. 2: Bullseye	Hardcover Trade paperback	PunisherMAX #6-11		May 2011 November 2011	978-0-7851-4755-8 978-0-7851-4756-5		
Punisher MAX vol. 3: Frank	Hardcover Trade paperback	PunisherMAX #12-16	120	October 2011	978-0-7851-5208-8 N/A		Cover by Dave Johnson
Punisher MAX vol. 4: Homeless	Trade paperback	PunisherMAX #17-22	128	October 31, 2012	0785152113; 978-0785152118		
Punisher MAX Omnibus	Hardcover	PunisherMAX #1-22; Punisher MAX X-Mas Special #1	544	June 4, 2014	978-0-7851-5429-7		
Punisher MAX: The Complete Collection Vol. 7	Trade paperback	PunisherMAX #1-22		December 2017	978-1-302-90912-3		Cover by Dave Johnson
