= Mike del Mundo =

Comic book artist

- Born: Philippines
- Area: Artist

Mike del Mundo is a comic book artist. He has published mainly as an artist for Marvel Comics, drawing series such as Uncanny X-Men, Avengers, Elektra, Immortal Hulk, and he has received multiple nominations for his work as a cover artist at Marvel. In August 2021, Del Mundo was among a group of creators who formed a deal with the subscription-based newsletter platform Substack to publish creator-owned comics project, and was announced by Jonathan Hickman as the main artist, together with Mike Huddleston, working for the new series Three Worlds / Three Moons. He also created the poster for the American television series Agents of S.H.I.E.L.D.'s episode "Turn, Turn, Turn".

== Early years ==
Mike del Mundo was born in 1980. His father was a musician, his mother was a teacher. The Filipino-born Canadian student was an active b-boy. He took part a competitions between Canada and the UK.

== Style ==
Mike del Mundo's work has been described as painterly, with strong movement panels.

He is best known for his cover art, as well as his interior work on titles such as Elektra, Weirdworld, X-Men: Legacy, and Avengers.

== Awards ==
=== Eisner Award ===
Year	Category	Result	Ref
2014	Best Cover Artist	Nominated	
2015	Best Painter/Multimedia Artist	Nominated	
2015	Best Cover Artist	Nominated	
2017	Best Cover Artist	Nominated	

=== Harvey Award ===
Year	Category	Result	Ref
2015	Best Cover Artist	Nominated	
2016	Best Cover Artist	Nominated	

=== Joe Shuster Award ===
Year	Category	Result	Ref
2011	Outstanding Cover Artist	Nominated	
2013	Outstanding Cover Artist	Won	
2014	Outstanding Cover Artist	Nominated	
2015	Outstanding Cover Artist	Nominated	
2017	Outstanding Cover Artist	Nominated	
2018	Outstanding Cover Artist	Nominated	
2018	Outstanding Artist	Nominated	

== Bibliography ==
=== Marvel Comics ===
==== Main artist ====
- Uncanny X-Men #17 (2012)
- A+X #2 (2013)
- Superior Spider-Man Team-Up #3-4 (2013)
- Elektra #1-5 and #8-11 (2014-2015)
- All-New X-Men #37 (2015)
- Weirdworld #1-5 (2015)
- Weirdworld #1-6 (2016)
- Totally Awesome Hulk #9 (2016)
- Avengers #1-6 and #9-11 (2017)
- Astonishing X-Men #6 (2017)
- Inhumans: Judgment Day One-shot (2017)
- Thor #1-4 (2018) (ongoing)
- Immortal Hulk: The Threshing Place (2020)

==== Contributor ====
- The Amazing Spider-Man #647 (2010)
- Fear Itself: The Home Front #3 (2011)
- Guardians of the Galaxy: Tomorrow's Avengers One-shot (2013)
- Mighty Thor #700 (2017)
