= R. M. Guéra =

Serbian comic book author and illustrator

Rajko Milošević-Guéra
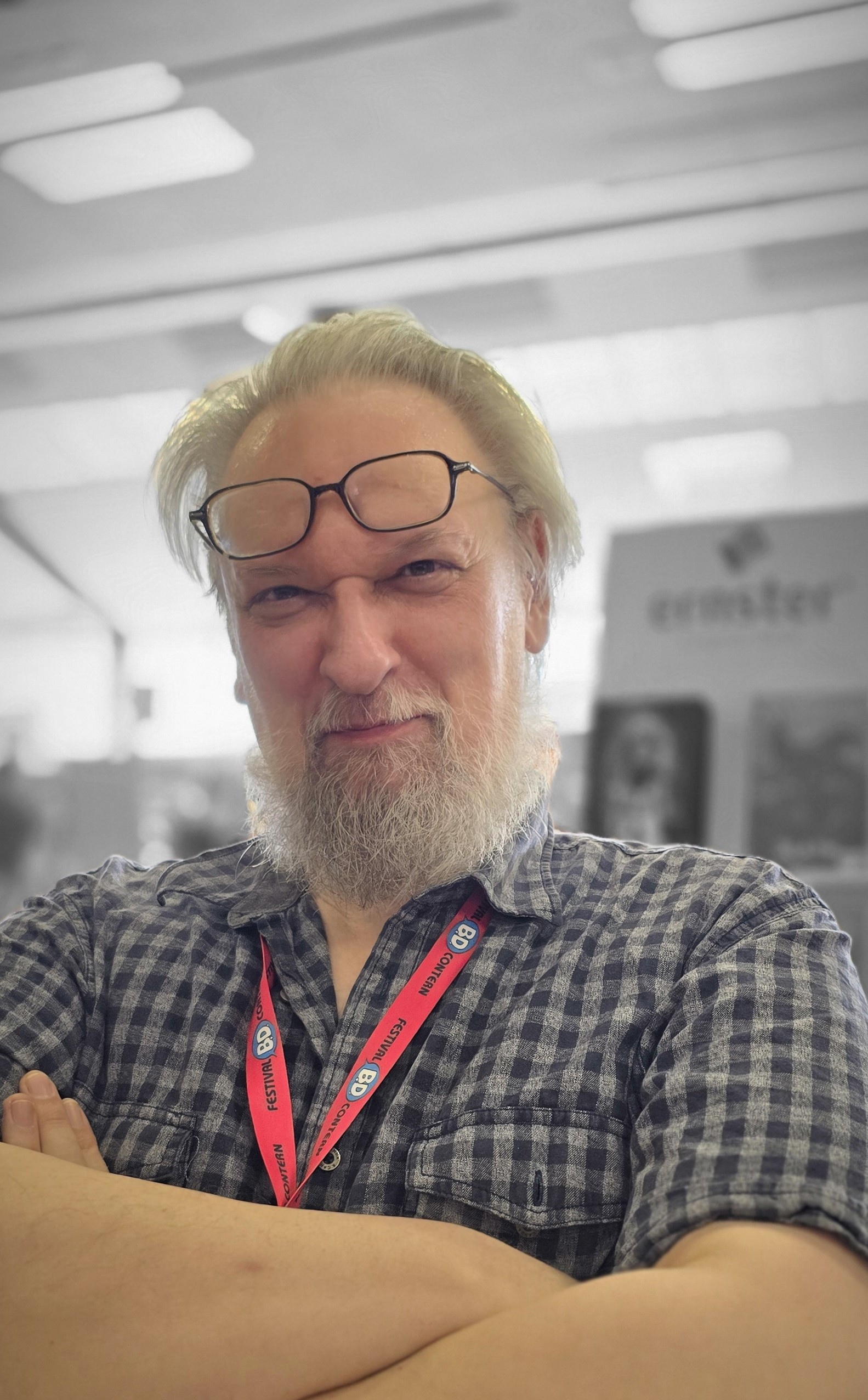
- Born: Rajko Milošević-Gera; November 24, 1959 (age 66); Belgrade, Yugoslavia
- Occupation: Writer

Rajko Milošević a.k.a. Gera and R. M. Guéra (Serbian Cyrillic: Рајко Милошевић - Гера; November 24, 1959) is a Serbian comic book author and illustrator. He has lived in Barcelona, Spain since 1991.

He debuted in the Yugoslav comic book industry in 1982 with the series Elmer Jones (Serbian Cyrillic: Елмер Џонс), a Leonesque western scripted by Dragan Savić. They later collaborated on Texas Riders (Serbian Cyrillic: Тексашки јахачи) in 1984.

Gera's work has been published in Spain, France and the United States. He worked on the Vertigo Comics series Scalped, with writer Jason Aaron, as well as on Le Lievre de Mars, with writer Patrick Cothias for French publisher Glénat.

Géra is a childhood nickname, and not part of his given name. He changed it to Guéra in the early 1990s when he moved to Barcelona, Spain, to adapt it to Spanish pronunciation.

== Gera’s Work in Former Yugoslavia ==
Guerra created Western comics. He began in former Yugoslavia with "Elmer Jones", first published in 1982 in YU strip. Next comic was "Chuck Lorimer", also a Western, published in YU strip godinjak in 1983. But Guerra received true recognition as one of the best Western authors in Yugoslavia in 1985-1986 when he published “Texan Riders” in Spunk novosti and Stripoteka. The comic was never finished. When Guerra was about to do the sequel in 2019, he received an offer from a European publisher to redraw the whole thing and publish it anew.

== Gera’s Work After 1991 ==
After Milošević left former Yugoslavia in 1991, he changed his pseudonym from Gera to the more "Spanishized" Guéra. Initially, he collaborated with Spanish writer Oscar Aibar on several short stories. He then shifted his focus to commercial work, including advertisements, design, covers, and animation storyboards. Guéra collaborated with Patrick Cothias on 'Le Lièvre de Mars', a series previously drawn by Antonio Parras for Glénat in France. In 2004, he created his own comic, the pirate story 'Howard Blake', for Glénat.

For the US market, Guéra worked on the Vertigo series 'Scalped' with Jason Aaron starting in 2007-2012. He also created the comic book adaptation of Quentin Tarantino's film 'Django Unchained' with Jason Latour as a DC Comics mini-series in 2012 and 2013.

In 2019, Guerra did an episode of Tex Willer titled "The Man with Golden Pistols" for the Italian publisher Bonelli comics.

In 2020, Guéra started a new series with Jason Aaron titled The Goddamned. This Image Comics series follows the story of the biblical character Cain. The comics features substantial profanity and debuted with an oversized 30-page issue.

== Guéra as a Musician ==
Miloešvić is a blues musician and has played in bands such as Strip Bluz Bandu (in Belgrade) and Custom Blend (in Spain).
