= Orb (comics) =

The Orb is the name of two supervillains appearing in American comic books published by Marvel Comics, primarily adversaries of Ghost Rider.

== Publication history ==
The Drake Shannon version of Orb debuted in Marvel Team-Up #15 (November 1973) and was created by writer Len Wein and artist Ross Andru.

The second Orb first appeared in Ghost Rider (vol. 6) #26 (October 2008) and was created by Jason Aaron and Tan Eng Huat.

Orb appeared as one of the villains in the 2014 crossover story Original Sin, which involved the theft of the eyes of the Watcher. Writer Jason Aaron said, "It was Tom [Breevort]'s ideally initially to use the Orb; no one will believe me on that, though. Using him is an obvious idea, but something I didn't think of until Tom mentioned it. Tom's thinking, rationally so, was that since we were doing a story which revolves around eyeballs being stolen then using a villain who got an eyeball for a head was perfect."

== Fictional character biography ==
=== Drake Shannon ===
The Orb
- Cover art to Ghost Rider (vol. 6) #30, art by Richard Corben

Publication information
- Publisher: Marvel Comics
- First appearance: Marvel Team-Up #15 (November 1973)
- Created by: Len Wein; Ross Andru

In-story information
- Alter ego: Drake Shannon
- Partnerships: Justin Hammer
- Abilities: Expert stunt motorcyclist Rides a specially modified motorcycle Via helmet: Laser blast projection Hypnosis

Drake Shannon was born in Wheeling, West Virginia. An accomplished motorcycle stunt rider, he owned one-half of the traveling motorcycle stunt show starring Johnny Blaze (who would later become Ghost Rider). The other half of the show was owned by Blaze's mentor, Crash Simpson.

While the partnership was initially amiable, Shannon and Simpson grew apart and eventually an intense rivalry developed. Neither wanted to work with the other, but neither wanted to sell their half of the show. To settle the dispute, the two men agreed to a lengthy race, with the winner receiving full ownership of the traveling show. During the race, Shannon deliberately swerves towards Simpson in an attempt to force Simpson to crash. Simpson manages to avoid crashing, while Shannon loses control of his motorcycle and crashes, leaving his face disfigured.

After recovering, Shannon is given a powerful motorcycle helmet by They Who Wield Power. The helmet is modeled to resemble a giant eyeball and can hypnotize others. A later version could shoot powerful laser beams from its "pupil".

Calling himself "the Orb", Shannon attempts to take over the traveling motorcycle stunt show which he had once half-owned. He puts dozens of civilians at risk, but informs Johnny Blaze (now the sole owner of the stunt show) that he would let them go unharmed in exchange for him gaining sole ownership. Although Blaze surrenders, Shannon instructs his minions to kill the hostages regardless. At this point, Ghost Rider and Spider-Man team up to defeat Orb.

Becoming a professional criminal, he returned several times, always plotting to get revenge on the Ghost Rider.

=== Agent of Zadkiel ===
The Orb

Publication information
- Publisher: Marvel Comics
- First appearance: Ghost Rider (vol. 6) #26 (October 2008)
- Created by: Jason Aaron; Tan Eng Huat

In-story information
- Alter ego: Unknown
- Species: Human mutate
- Partnerships: Zadkiel; Doctor Midas; Exterminatrix
- Abilities: Use of ray gun Possesses an eye of Uatu

A successor to the original Orb, he was born with a head that resembled a giant eye. He was abandoned at a young age and grew up in a freak show. After performing a number of unidentified jobs, Orb begins working for Zadkiel.

Orb appears in the miniseries Astonishing Spider-Man & Wolverine, where he is sent skipping through time by a set of glowing diamonds. Eventually, he gains some understanding of time travel, but is apprehended by the Minutemen before he can put this knowledge to use.

Orb later appears with a group of minions in eye-based masks, having stolen the eyes of a group of people at a bank. He claims that he rolls around naked in eyeballs, regarding the eyes as 'windows to the soul' that he can gather power from before his rematch with Ghost Rider. He claims that he could see the true selves of the Hulk and Red She-Hulk when he looks into their eyes, describing Betty's conflicting relationship with her father Thunderbolt Ross and recognizing that a 'monster' was behind Hulk's eyes that was not the Hulk himself.

In the wake of Uatu the Watcher's murder in the 2014 miniseries "Original Sin", Orb and Exterminatrix are discovered to be in possession of one of Uatu's gouged-out eyes. After he is captured, Orb maintains that he did not kill Uatu. As the storyline concludes, Orb has merged with one of Uatu's eyes, which now resides in his chest.

Orb witnesses the arrival of the multiversal Masters of Evil. When he declares his intention to watch the group's actions, he is killed by Doom Supreme.

== Powers and abilities ==
Drake Shannon is an athletic man with no superhuman powers. He is an expert stunt motorcyclist and a capable hand-to-hand combatant. However, Orb is criminally insane as a result of the accident which disfigured his face. As Orb, he wears a helmet originally provided by "They Who Wield Power" composed of unspecified materials, containing specialized micro-circuitry, capable of firing laser blasts and hypnotizing victims. Orb rides a motorcycle which he specially modified.

The second Orb used a repulsor ray gun. Unlike the original Orb, this Orb's head is an actual giant eyeball. He claims to be able to talk by flexing certain muscles in his 'eye'/head. He has merged with one of the eyes of Uatu, which now resides in his chest.

== Other versions ==
=== Old Man Logan ===
An alternate universe version of the second Orb appears in "Old Man Hawkeye". He is confronted by Bullseye, who removes Uatu's eye from his chest.

=== Ultimate Universe ===
An alternate universe version of the second Orb appears in The Ultimates. He is among the prisoner of H.A.N.D. until Wasp frees him.

== In other media ==
The Drake Shannon incarnation of Orb appears in M.O.D.O.K., voiced by Bill Hader. This version is a bartender at the Bar with No Name.
