= Deathwatch (comics) =

Publication information
- Publisher: Marvel Comics
- First appearance: Ghost Rider (vol. 3) #1 (May 1990)
- Created by: Howard Mackie; Javier Saltares

In-story information
- Species: Extra-dimensional creature
- Team affiliations: Translords; International Contractors Unlimited
- Notable aliases: Stephen Lords
- Abilities: Superhuman strength, speed, agility, reflexes. Ability to absorb life essence upon the death of another being to enhance his physiology. Ability to psychically view others' short-term memories.

Deathwatch is a character appearing in American comic books published by Marvel Comics. The character is usually depicted as a demonic supervillain and enemy of the third Ghost Rider, Danny Ketch.

== Publication history ==
Deathwatch first appeared in Ghost Rider vol. 3 #1 and was created by Howard Mackie and Javier Saltares. He has appeared in or has been mentioned in New Avengers, Siege, the 2007 Thor run, Web of Spider-Man, Two Brothers: A Ghost Rider Family Road Trip, Infamous Iron Man, and The Invincible Iron Man series.

== Fictional character biography ==
Deathwatch is a Translord from an unknown demonic dimension. Posing as a crime boss in the real world as Stephen Lords, Deathwatch plots to destroy New York City through a poisonous toxin. After a youth gang called the Cypress Hill Jokers unwittingly steals the canisters containing the biotoxin, Deathwatch battles with the Kingpin for the canisters, and set Blackout against Ghost Rider. Deathwatch and Blackout attack the 75th Precinct police station and steal the biotoxin canisters. They also abduct Paulie Stratton and her fellow Cypress Hill Jokers, battling the Kingpin's men.

Becoming a personal enemy of Ghost Rider, Deathwatch employed several assassins, including countless Deathspawn from the demon world. After being killed in battle, Deathwatch is resurrected by the Deathspawn, Hag, and Troll.

Centurious fully resurrects Deathwatch to help in an attempt to steal Ghost Rider's chain. During his battle with Ghost Rider, Deathwatch reveals that his original intent during the events involving the poisonous canisters was to obtain Ghost Rider's medallion of power. He is easily defeated by the combined power of Ghost Rider and Johnny Blaze.

The Hood hires Deathwatch as part of his criminal organization to take advantage of the split in the superhero community caused by the Superhuman Registration Act. He helps them fight the New Avengers, but is taken down by Doctor Strange.

== Powers and abilities ==
Deathwatch is a native of an alien demonic dimension and so derived at least some of his superhuman powers from his non-human heritage. Deathwatch has the ability to absorb life from another creature that is experiencing pain or death and enhance his own health, strength, stamina, agility, and reflexes. He has the ability to physically penetrate a victim's body and disrupt internal organs without creating a surface wound. He also has the ability to absorb and access a victim's short-term memories by penetrating the victim's brain physically with his fingers, and has the ability to derive surges of physical and emotional pleasure from the proximity of death.

Deathwatch is a skilled ninja, and highly proficient in acrobatic hand-to-hand combat, and is an experienced strangler. He is a master planner and strategist, and a skilled acrobat. He employs a wide range of warriors, including being the head of his own criminal combine and a group of ninja warriors. He usually wears a costume of synthetic stretch fabric lined with Kevlar.

== In other media ==
Deathwatch appears in Ghost Rider, voiced by Lex Lang.
