= Zarathos =

- Cover of Marvel Comics' Ghost Rider (vol. 2) #77

Publication information
- Publisher: Marvel Comics
- First appearance: Marvel Spotlight #5 (August 1972)
- Created by: Roy Thomas, Gary Friedrich and Mike Ploog

In-story information
- Full name: Zarathos
- Species: Demon
- Place of origin: Earth
- Partnerships: Mephisto; Lilith
- Notable aliases: Ghost Rider
- Abilities: Virtual immortality Superhuman strength Healing factor Elemental powers

Zarathos (UK: /ˈzærəθɒs/, US: /-θoʊs/) is a character appearing in American comic books published by Marvel Comics. He is usually depicted in stories featuring the character known as the Ghost Rider. A demonic being who tortures and devours souls, Zarathos first appeared in Marvel Spotlight #5 (August 1972) and was created by writers Roy Thomas and Gary Friedrich and artist Mike Ploog.

== Publication history ==
He first appears in Marvel Spotlight #5 (August 1972), and was created by writers Roy Thomas and Gary Friedrich and artist Mike Ploog.

== Fictional character biography ==
The physical stone body of the demon Zarathos had lain inert and inanimate beneath the Earth for eons until his spirit was summoned by a Native American tribal sorcerer named K'Nutu to help his tribe. Zarathos was offered a steady supply of souls to consume in exchange for his aid in vanquishing enemies of the sorcerer's tribe and for offering his might in their service.

A cult was built up around Zarathos, which garnered the attention of Mephisto. Mephisto decided that Zarathos had too much of a following and was depriving him and the other Lords of Hell of souls. Mephisto eventually confronted Zarathos and defeated him by the deceptive use of his soulless pawn, Centurious.

In modern times, Zarathos is bound to Johnny Blaze after Blaze is transformed into the Ghost Rider. This results in an eventual clash over Blaze's body, as Mephisto temporarily frees Zarathos to compete with Johnny Blaze for his freedom. However, Centurious returns and has the Sin-Eater use his Soul Crystal to suck Blaze's soul from his body. This greatly weakens Zarathos, who, without Blaze's soul, finds himself dying. Using the last of his strength, Zarathos splits the crystal in half, freeing Blaze's soul.

Zarathos gains enough power to defeat Ghost Rider and absorb his essence. However, he suffers intense pain as Ghost Rider is still residing within him. This gives the Midnight Sons a chance to defeat Zarathos. Blade defeats Zarathos by turning him into stone. Zarathos remains petrified until the series Ghost Rider: Hammerlane, where he reconstitutes himself within Johnny Blaze's body. However, Blaze manages to have Zarathos exorcised from him.

== Powers and abilities ==
Zarathos is continuously shown to be able to challenge Mephisto in both Earthly and magical combat. He possesses immeasurable levels of strength and stamina well beyond that of his hosts and is wholly immune to anything other than the powers of beings such as the One Above All. When at full strength, Zarathos has exhibited influence over certain Earthly elements; he is able to conjure thunderstorms to incinerate his opponents with bolts of lightning, as well as rupture the ground either to trap his victims in hard rock or to impale them with spiked stalagmites.

He is able to shoot hellfire from his hands, and can transport both himself and others to different locations. Apparently, the more souls he consumes, the more powerful he becomes. Zarathos also has significant knowledge of magical lore and possesses the ability to manipulate magical energies for a variety of effects.
