= Ghost Rider (video game) =

2007 video game

- North American PlayStation 2 cover art
- Developers: Climax Action (PlayStation systems); Magic Pockets (GBA)
- Publisher: 2K
- Director: Mark Simmons
- Designer: Sam Barlow
- Programmers: Kostas Kostiadis; Dave Owens
- Artists: Glenn Brace; Neale Williams
- Composer: Timo Baker
- Engine: RenderWare
- Platforms: PlayStation 2 PlayStation Portable; Game Boy Advance
- Release: NA: February 13, 2007; AU: February 16, 2007 (PS2, PSP); EU: February 23, 2007
- Genres: Action-adventure, hack and slash
- Mode: Single-player

Ghost Rider is a 2007 hack and slash video game released for PlayStation 2, PlayStation Portable and Game Boy Advance based on the 2007 film Ghost Rider. An Xbox version was originally planned for release, but was cancelled.

The game's storyline takes place after the events seen in the film, and was penned by Marvel writers Garth Ennis and Jimmy Palmiotti. Players can play as Ghost Rider both on foot or on the Hellcycle. The villains are from both the film and the comic, including Scarecrow, Deathwatch, and Lilith.

The game received mixed reviews for PlayStation 2 and Game Boy Advance and mixed to negative reviews for PlayStation Portable.

== Gameplay ==
The game features a system reminiscent to that of God of War and Devil May Cry, even having some of the same controls and style of attacks. Combos are done with bare hands and with the Demonic chain. When on the Hellcycle, Ghost Rider is still capable of performing some of the same chain attacks, and can shoot hellfire.

The Game Boy Advance version has some elements of Road Rash and Castlevania.

=== Alternate characters ===
After beating the game on certain difficulty levels, bonus character skins can be unlocked. They include Classic Ghost Rider, Ghost Rider 2099, Vengeance, and Blade the vampire hunter.

=== Blade ===
If the player chooses to start the game again as Blade, they get slightly changed gameplay. Blade has only his Daywalker Sword for a weapon, he does not have the shotgun or chain-link attacks of Ghost Rider. Combo attacks are much more limited. He also does not replenish health by absorbing flames from the occasional fire-drums scattered throughout the game levels. Instead, Blade can suck the life force from any wounded foe that is a non-boss (readiness is indicated by a circle above their heads). However, during the motorcycle-racing sections, his vehicle can still shoot firebolts, and he can use his sword for melee combat.

=== PSP racing ===
The PSP version has an exclusive racing circuit gameplay, which includes not just Ghost Rider and the alternate characters who are playable in storyline, but also Ghost Rider's human form Johnny Blaze, Caretaker, Lilith and Deathwatch. In this gameplay, the racer can use a power icon, which allows them to utilizes their boost, traps and alternate projectiles, similar to Nintendo's Mario Kart series. The racing circuit stage includes the Daily Bugle from Spider-Man trilogy franchise.

== Plot ==
Mephisto tells Vengeance to bring the Ghost Rider to him. Vengeance pursues Johnny on his own Hellcycle and captures him, opening a fiery portal to Hell in midair. In a fit of rage, Johnny becomes the Rider. Eventually, he reaches the Gates of Hell. However, Mephisto appears and prevents his escape. He explains to Johnny that he is losing his grip on his demons, which are escaping Hell and rampaging on the surface and, if not stopped, could trigger the apocalypse. If his army cannot be kept under control, the Angels of Heaven have threatened to subsume Mephisto's kingdom.

To prevent it, he recruits the Rider. Johnny dismisses him, though agrees when Mephisto sends Vengeance to kill Roxanne Simpson—forcing Blaze to kill Vengeance. He travels back to Earth and proceeds to San Venganza to fight Lilith and the demon goddess' sons, along with the Dark Heart monsters, as well as the other demons who had escaped from Hell. Soon, he faces Lilith and kills her; with Johnny unaware that some of the demon goddess' sons, the Lilin, have survived and escaped with Blackheart's body. The Caretaker/Phantom Rider arrives, accompanied by the dhampir vampire-hunter Blade to help Ghost Rider. They tell the Rider that Blackout has joined forces with Deathwatch and his demons to steal military hardware. Johnny travels to and ultimately kills Blackout while Blade finds and hides Blackheart's body.

Caught off guard, Ghost Rider discovers that Roxanne has been kidnapped by Scarecrow. Having beaten him and saved Roxanne, Johnny is directed – by Scarecrow – to the carnival where his father was killed. There, he meets Mephisto, who reveals that he was against the Rider all along.

In order to summon a portal to Hell and usher in the Apocalypse (but knowing that any efforts using demons would have been thwarted by the Angels), Mephisto sent Ghost Rider on his quest so that the hellfire of his cycle would inscribe the massive geoglyph necessary to summon the portal. After the explanation, Blackheart, whose body was supposed to be hidden by Blade, manages to reawaken itself and escape to find Ghost Rider's and Mephisto's whereabouts. He immediately grows immensely powerful—though is taken down by Johnny. Mephisto disappears with Blackheart's body and Johnny reunites with Roxanne.

== Reception ==
Reception

Aggregate score
Aggregator	Score		
Aggregator	GBA	PS2	PSP
Metacritic	68/100	54/100	49/100

Review scores
Publication	Score		
Publication	GBA	PS2	PSP
1Up.com	N/A	C	C−
Edge	N/A	6/10	N/A
Eurogamer	N/A	5/10	N/A
Game Informer	N/A	6.75/10	N/A
GamePro	N/A	3.25/5	N/A
GameSpot	7.8/10	4/10	4.3/10
GameSpy	2.5/5	2.5/5	3/5
GameZone	7.5/10	5.4/10	4.5/10
IGN	N/A	4/10	4.5/10
PlayStation: The Official Magazine	N/A	6.5/10	N/A
Detroit Free Press	N/A	N/A	1/4

The Game Boy Advance and PlayStation 2 versions of Ghost Rider received "mixed or average reviews", while the PSP version received "generally unfavorable reviews", according to the review aggregation website Metacritic.
