= Ghost Rider (Robbie Reyes) =

Hero from Marvel Comics

Robbie Reyes Ghost Rider
- Textless variant cover of All-New Ghost Rider #2 (April 2014); Art by Felipe Smith

Publication information
- Publisher: Marvel Comics
- First appearance: All-New Ghost Rider #1 (March 2014)
- Created by: Felipe Smith; Tradd Moore

In-story information
- Alter ego: Roberto "Robbie" Reyes
- Species: Human/demon hybrid
- Team affiliations: Avengers; Ghost Racers
- Notable aliases: Skeleton Driver; Robot Racer; La Leyenda; Hellcharger
- Abilities: Proficient hand-to-hand combatant; Highly experienced driver; Superhuman conditioning; Enhanced senses; Hearing, vision, stamina, strength, speed, agility, intelligence, endurance; Fury empowerment; Immunity to fire; Demonic transfusion; Regeneration; Immortality; Penance stare; Pyrokinesis; Mediumship; Teleportation; Portal creation; Use of enchanted Dodge Charger and hellfire chain; Magic immunity; Size manipulation; Soul manipulation; Soul reading; Soul cleansing; Soul consumption; Self-duplication; Sin manipulation; Sin perception; Sin eating; Hellfire manipulation; Hellfire infusion; Hellfire projection; Hellfire constructs; Hell firestorm; Demon magic manipulation; Knowledge of the occult; Supernatural awareness; Invulnerability; Resurrection

Roberto "Robbie" Reyes is an antihero appearing in American comic books published by Marvel Comics. He is the fifth Marvel character to use the name Ghost Rider, after Carter Slade (the Western comics hero later known as the Phantom Rider), Johnny Blaze, Danny Ketch and Alejandra Jones.

Gabriel Luna portrays Reyes in the fourth season of the Marvel Cinematic Universe television series Agents of S.H.I.E.L.D.

== Publication history ==
Robbie Reyes first appeared in All-New Ghost Rider #1 (March 2014), created by writer Felipe Smith and artist Tradd Moore.

When Marvel Comics was getting retooled as All-New, All-Different Marvel, editor Mark Paniccia approached writer Felipe Smith on creating a newer and younger Ghost Rider. Among Paniccia's suggestions were that this new Ghost Rider drive a car instead of a motorcycle, an idea that excited Smith. Another big difference between this Ghost Rider and its predecessors is that Reyes doesn't have a floating head, or a human skull, Smith says. "He's an amalgam of a flaming car and a human being. He's not wearing a helmet, and his head isn't a skull: this Ghost Rider is designed so his look simulates the lines of the classic muscle car he was racing the night he died." Tradd Moore was brought in to sketch ideas based on Smith's concept.

He also, more recently, appears on Ghost Rider (2016), Marvel Legacy and Avengers (2018) #1.

== Fictional character biography ==
Felipe Smith's TV variant cover art to Ghost Rider (2017) #4.

Robbie Reyes is a high-school student working as a mechanic at an auto body shop who lives with his developmentally disabled brother Gabe Reyes and serves as their primary caretaker after their parents abandoned them two years earlier. Seeking to escape the dangerous streets of Los Angeles, he enters a street race, hoping to use the prize money to move themselves away. He is gunned down by mercenaries trying to retrieve pills that caused the transformation of Calvin Zabo into the supervillain Mr. Hyde, which had been left in the trunk of the 1969 Dodge Charger he "borrowed" from the auto body shop for the race. He is revived as a demonic being with a flaming, helmet-like head. He drives off in the car, now similarly ablaze.

Later, the spirit bound to the car introduces itself to Robbie as the ghost of a man named Eli Morrow, who says he had been killed by gang members. Eli offers to help Robbie clean up his neighborhood in exchange for Robbie helping him avenge his death. Robbie becomes a local hero whose fame catches the attention of Johnny Blaze, who travels to Los Angeles to confront the new Rider. Eli is later revealed as Robbie's estranged uncle, a Satanic serial killer who kidnapped and murdered at least thirty-seven people in rituals before being fatally shot by police in 1999. A possessed Robbie later encounters Johnny Blaze, who uses the Penance Stare on Eli's spirit.

Eli was also the one who pushed Robbie's mother down the stairs while she was pregnant with Gabe, causing Gabe's disabilities.

In addition to confronting Mr. Hyde and his criminal underworld, Robbie and Eli fight for dominance over Robbie's body. Robbie eventually permanently bonds with Eli and agrees to sate Eli's thirst for murder, but only by killing people with evil souls.

He appears in The Unbelievable Gwenpool along with Hawkeye, both working to stop a ceremony being held by dwarves using a mystical space rock. Gwenpool appeared in his trunk's portal via her friend Sarah "The Terrible Eye" and the police arrived, prompting them all to flee. He had claimed the gem with Gwen's ghost friend Cecil inside and left it in his car, where his possessing spirit was apparently attempting to turn Cecil on Gwen. When that fails he shrugs it off and decides to just go back to corrupting Robbie.

Following a vivid nightmare involving an ancient gathering of heroes that include a previous Ghost Rider, Robbie awakens in South Africa with no memory of how he got there. He is attacked by Star Brand, who seeks to keep him from finding a buried Celestial. Robbie defeats Star Brand by using the Penance Stare, an ability he previously had no idea he possessed, but accidentally kills Star Brand as well.

Robbie then joins a new team of Avengers formed by Thor, Iron Man, and Captain America to fight off the Celestial Final Host. Sometime later, word of Star Brand's death reaches Odin. The long-time ally of the original pre-historic Star Brand thought that Robbie killed the current Star Brand purposely. Robbie explains to the All-Father of Norse Gods about his accidental murder of the latter Star Brand when his Penance Stare first awakened, thus easily winning forgiveness and making friends.

In light of the threat caused by the multiversal Masters of Evil, Ghost Rider travels the multiverse with a Deathlok working for Avenger Prime that became his companion as they look to find allies to fight them. They end up recruiting Ant-Man of Earth-818, Star Panther, several alternate universe versions of Captain America, the Thor of Earth-56377, who wields the power of Iron Fist; the Carol Corps; and several versions of Iron Man. On an alternate Earth, Ghost Rider, Deathlok, and Ant-Man arrive on an alternate Earth to assist Captain Fury in fighting the Goblin Corps. With time being up, Ghost Rider, Deathlok, and Ant-Man can finally head to the Avengers Tower at Infinity's End. Ghost Rider is contacted by the souls in his Hell Charger asking why he has forsaken them and that another Spirit of Vengeance has fallen. As Ant-Man and Deathlok start to voice their concern, Ghost Rider uses his chains on them and drives off.Doom Supreme, who starts to overpower him. Deathlok and Ant-Man arrive, with Ant-Man shrinking Doom Supreme to microscopic size. When Dark Phoenix goes on the attack, Deathlok instructs Ant-Man to get Ghost Rider away while he buys them time to escape. After Deathlok is killed, Doom Supreme states that they need to regroup before they visit where Ghost Rider and Ant-Man have fled to.

Robbie Reyes and Ant-Man arrive at the Avengers Tower in the Quarry of Creation where the Hell Charger drives into some of the attacking members of the Council of Red. Robbie states to Ant-Man that he cannot transform into Ghost Rider. Robbie Reyes was in the Avengers Tower at the time when Doom Supreme arrived at the God Quarry with Doom the Living Planet and the Doctor Doom variants that are loyal to him. As the fight between the different Avengers team against Mephisto and Doom Supreme rages on, Robbie Reyes watches the battle with an older Star Brand as they talk about how their powers have not been working right. As some Doom variants move in to attack them, Robbie holds Star Brand's hand as he regains his powers to incinerate a Doom variant. When the ancient Multiverse energies leak out, Ghost Rider takes his Hell Charger and sacrifices himself to block the leak from the other side. Ghost Rider survives in the sea of darkness and rebuilds his Hell Charger to return to Earth.

== Powers and abilities ==
Robbie differs from previous Ghost Riders, mainly because he is not possessed by a Spirit of Vengeance or any similar demonic entity. Rather, he is possessed by the spirit of Eli Morrow, a deceased serial killing Satanist who worked for the Russian mob as a hit-man. Despite this, he has abilities similar to his predecessors; he possesses superhuman strength, speed, agility, stamina, and durability potent enough to challenge Thor or Captain Marvel, as well as the natural Rider's capability of conjuring natural and hellish flames. He wields a supernaturally strong chain weapon, and can banish people to Hell or outright consume their souls. As the All-Rider, Robbie can ride anything as a vehicle.

Unlike previous Ghost Riders, who use motorcycles, Robbie drives a 1969 Dodge Charger R/T called the Hell Charger. The Hell Charger is linked to the Ghost Rider, allowing Robbie in his Ghost Rider form to instantly teleport to or merge with the car. It also acts as a warp hub with which he can teleport using shadows. Furthermore, the Charger possesses high levels of speed that enable it to travel between universes. The Charger can also be driven remotely, and Robbie's Ghost Rider form can pass harmlessly through it, allowing it to drive into foes. The car's trunk, when opened, acts as a portal through Hell, allowing the Ghost Rider to transport anything, including people, to any location. Robbie, through his Hell Charger, can create portals out of hellfire to take himself anywhere he can think of while Eli can change the shape and appearance of the vehicle. Eli is shown to be able to take control of Robbie's body, which is signified in his human form by a pallid skin tone and his eyes turning orange. The vehicle can also contact the spirits of the deceased as it was able to enlist the aid of Tony's dead father Howard Stark to ask for information.

During his battle with Star Brand, Robbie discovers that he possesses the Penance Stare, which allows him to force anyone who makes eye contact with him to experience all of the pain and suffering they have ever inflicted on others. His Ghost Rider form can also evolve into a stronger, more demonic form when Robbie is sufficiently angered, though this transformation is harder to control and more destructive. While battling corrupted Celestials, Robbie realized he had entrenched a simple tractor with his rider properties. Similarly to Daniel Ketch, Robbie's rider transformation changes everything within reach alongside him as well.

== Other versions ==
=== Heroes Reborn ===
In an alternate universe depicted in the miniseries Heroes Reborn, Robbie Reyes never became Ghost Rider and instead lived a normal life.

=== Secret Wars ===
An alternate universe version of Robbie Reyes appears in "Secret Wars". This version possesses an "igniter spirit", for which he is taken to the Killiseum and forced to participate in Arcade's Ghost Races. Dubbed the Hell-Charger to distinguish himself from other Ghost Riders, Reyes loses his first race, but makes a deal with his spirit Eli to win every race onward, becoming popular with audiences.

=== Venomverse ===
An alternate universe version of Robbie possessed by Eli and Venom calling himself Host Rider appears in the 2017 Venomverse storyline. Due to Eli and Venom uniting against him, Robbie became a puppet. Host Rider is recruited by a "Venomized" Doctor Strange to join an army of Venoms to defeat a species capable of taking over symbiotes and their hosts called Poisons. While Host Rider is assimilated by the Poisons, they are killed by an alternate universe version of Carnage.

== In other media ==
=== Television ===
- Robbie Reyes appears in the fourth season of Agents of S.H.I.E.L.D., portrayed by Gabriel Luna. This version gained his powers after he and his brother, Gabe, were attacked by a street gang called the Fifth Street Locos, who mistook Robbie for his uncle Eli Morrow. Gabe is paralyzed while Robbie's injuries are fatal. But a "good Samaritan", Johnny Blaze / Ghost Rider, rescues Gabe and revives Robbie by giving him the spirit of vengeance.
  - In October 2016, Luna discussed plans for Reyes to feature in a solo television series following his introduction in Agents of S.H.I.E.L.D. In later interviews, Luna stated he hopes Norman Reedus would portray Johnny Blaze in the Marvel Cinematic Universe. On May 1, 2019, it was announced that a television series based on Robbie Reyes's incarnation of Ghost Rider would have premiered on Hulu in 2020, with Luna reprising his role. On September 25, 2019, however, Deadline reported that the series was no longer moving forward. Hulu cited this happened due to a "creative impasse", but would potentially shop it around.
- Robbie Reyes / Ghost Rider makes a non-speaking appearance in Lego Marvel Avengers: Loki in Training.

=== Video games ===
- Robbie Reyes / Ghost Rider appears as a "team-up" character in Marvel Heroes.
- Robbie Reyes / Ghost Rider appeared as a playable character in Marvel Avengers Academy.
- Robbie Reyes / Ghost Rider appears as a playable character in Marvel: Future Fight.
- Robbie Reyes / Ghost Rider appears as an NPC in Marvel Future Revolution.
- Robbie Reyes / Ghost Rider appears as a playable character in Marvel's Midnight Suns, voiced by Giancarlo Sabogal and Darin De Paul respectively. This version is a member of the eponymous group.
- Robbie Reyes / Ghost Rider appears as a playable character in Marvel Tōkon: Fighting Souls, voiced by Giancarlo Sabogal in English and Katsuyuki Konishi in Japanese. This version leads a team called the Samurai Outriders, consisting of himself, Blade, Loki, and Deadpool, in response to rescue his brother Gabe from the Elders of the Universe.

=== Miscellaneous ===
Robbie Reyes appears in the War of the Realms motion comic, voiced by Edwin Perez.

== Collected editions ==
Title	Material collected	Published date	ISBN
All-New Ghost Rider Vol. 1: Engines of Vengeance	All-New Ghost Rider #1-5	October 2014	978-0785154556
All-New Ghost Rider Vol. 2: Legend	All-New Ghost Rider #6-12	June 2015	978-0785154563
Ghost Racers	Ghost Racers #1-4, Ghost Rider (vol. 1) #35	January 2016	978-0785199212
A Year of Marvels	Ghost Rider X-Mas Special and A Year of Marvels: The Amazing, The Incredible, The Unstoppable The Unbeatable and The Uncanny and Marvel New Year's Eve Special infinite comics	May 2017	978-1302902957
Ghost Rider: Four on the Floor	Ghost Rider (vol. 8) #1-5	July 2017	978-0785196648
Ghost Rider: Robbie Reyes - The Complete Collection	All-New Ghost Rider #1-12, Ghost Rider (vol. 8) #1-5, What If? Ghost Rider #1	June 2021	978-1302925345
