= Blackheart =

Marvel Comics fictional character

- Blackheart as he appears in Marvel vs. Capcom 2.

Publication information
- Publisher: Marvel Comics
- First appearance: Daredevil #270 (September 1989)
- Created by: Ann Nocenti (writer); John Romita Jr. (artist)

In-story information
- Species: Demon
- Team affiliations: Hellfire Club; Avengers Academy
- Notable aliases: Black King, Voice, Son of Satan, Gabriel
- Abilities: High intelligence; Reality warping; Magical and mystical powers; Shapeshifting; Telepathy; Telekinesis; Accelerated healing; Superhuman physical attributes

Blackheart is a character appearing in American comic books published by Marvel Comics, usually as an adversary to the superhero Ghost Rider. Created by writer Ann Nocenti and artist John Romita Jr., Blackheart first appeared in Daredevil #270 (September 1989).

Blackheart is a demon and the creation of Mephisto, who he has opposed on several occasions. In the 2024 series Avengers Academy: Marvel's Voices, Blackheart refuses to retrieve Billy and Tommy Maximoff for Mephisto, which results in Mephisto transforming Blackheart into a human and banishing him to Earth. Significantly weakened, though retaining a portion of his powers, Blackheart seeks refuge at the Avengers Academy and becomes a student there.

The character has also appeared in other media, such as the 2000 video game Marvel vs. Capcom 2: New Age of Heroes and in the 2007 film Ghost Rider, in which he was portrayed by actor Wes Bentley.

== Publication history ==
The character was created by Ann Nocenti and John Romita Jr. and first appeared in Daredevil #270 (September 1989).

Blackheart was redesigned for the series Avengers Academy: Marvel's Voices, where Mephisto transformed him into a human. Writer Anthony Oliveira and artist Bailie Rosenlund decided to give Blackheart a gothic appearance, with red eyes and a hairstyle resembling his demon form's spiky head. Blackheart has thorn-like tattoos on his upper body, reminiscent of the bramble bushes of Christ's Crown.

== Fictional character biography ==
Blackheart is a demon and the son of Mephisto, who created him from the evil energy that accumulated in Christ's Crown, New York, draws the attention of a Hell-lord, Mephisto, who creates a "son," Blackheart, from evil energy. Blackheart becomes impressed by humanity's free will and concludes that evil cannot hope to win out against good. When Mephisto learns of Blackheart's change of mind, he banishes him to Earth, warning him that if he ever uses his power again, he will be driven mad.

Blackheart uses a dagger tipped with the blood of a young girl to kill Mephisto and take over a portion of Hell. He later tricks Noble Kale and tries to recruit him into his Spirits of Vengeance, promising Kale the power to rule in Hell alongside him. Kale double-crosses Blackheart, freeing the other Spirits of Vengeance and gaining rule over Blackheart's portion of Hell.

Blackheart concocts a scheme to bring Hell to Earth and steal the souls of the planet's residents. As part of the plan, he assumes a human form and runs an operation in Las Vegas that sees him create several clones of X-23 and bond them to genetically created symbiotes. After Ghost Rider accidentally transports Hell to Las Vegas, Blackheart is confronted by Ghost Rider, Venom, Red Hulk, and X-23, and summons four creatures that represent the antitheses of the four and sets them against the heroes.

In Avengers Academy: Marvel's Voices, Blackheart is sent by Mephisto to retrieve the time-displaced souls of Billy and Tommy Maximoff from the Avengers Academy campus. Despite viewing the twins' souls as innocent, Blackheart reluctantly follows through with his father's orders but is thwarted by Bloodline and Escapade. Influenced by Escapade's powers, Blackheart lets the boys go and returns to Hell empty handed. As punishment, Mephisto turns Blackheart into a human with diminished powers and banishes him to Earth. Blackheart requests shelter at the Avengers Academy and is reluctantly allowed to join the student body, eventually taking the alias Gabriel.

== Powers and abilities ==
Blackheart is a powerful demon created by Mephisto. He possesses vast inherent supernatural powers, including superhuman strength, speed and endurance which are magical in nature. He also has telekinetic and telepathic powers and can levitate, teleport inter-dimensionally, change his size and physical form, enter and leave different planes of existence and dimensions at will, heal himself at the sub-molecular level and has the ability to generate various forms of energies for destructive purposes, such as powerful concussive blasts of black energy. He also possesses very high intelligence. Blackheart has demonstrated the ability to call forth armies from the pits of Hell. He has no soul, making him invulnerable to the Ghost Rider's Penance Stare.

== Kid Blackheart ==
Kid Blackheart

Publication information
- Publisher: Marvel Comics
- First appearance: Ghost Riders: Heaven's on Fire #1 (September 2009)
- Created by: Jason Aaron

In-story information
- Alter ego: Anton Satan
- Notable aliases: Antichrist

Kid Blackheart is an incarnation of the Antichrist, created by devil worshippers via selective breeding. After learning of the cult, Zadkiel kills all of its members to prevent the apocalypse from coming to pass. However, Kid Blackheart manages to escape. After facing another assassination attempt, Kid Blackheart is saved by Jaine Cutter. Cutter and Kid Blackheart fled but were again trapped by a group of mindless minions. Hellstorm, also tracking the boy so that he might kill him, ended up having no choice but to defend him from his attackers. Kid Blackheart ran, but did not get far before encountering Daniel Ketch. Ketch explains that he made a deal with the devil to keep the boy safe in exchange for the keys to Heaven to stop Zadkiel.

Kid Blackheart learns that Caretaker's body serves as a portal to Heaven and attempts to use her as a means to invade Heaven with an army of demons. However, Kid Blackheart is fended off by an army of Ghost Riders.

== Reception ==
In 2020, CBR.com ranked Blackheart 6th in their "10 Most Powerful Comic Book Villains With Demonic Origins" list.

== Other versions ==
Blackheart appears in Marvel Zombies 3.

== In other media ==
=== Film ===
Blackheart appears in Ghost Rider (2007), portrayed by Wes Bentley. This version primarily assumes and maintains a human form with pale skin and black hair, though he displays traces of his demonic facial features at varying points in the film. Additionally, he is stated to have all of his father, Mephistopheles', powers along with a "lethal touch" that he can use to kill people, an immunity to holy objects and places since he was born in hell, and no soul, which makes him immune to the Ghost Rider's Penance Stare. Blackheart seeks to obtain the Contract of San Venganza, which grants its owner access to the power of a thousand evil souls. Upon learning of his son's search, Mephistopheles transforms Johnny Blaze into the Ghost Rider and tasks him with bringing in Blackheart. Despite Blaze's efforts, Blackheart succeeds in obtaining the contract and fuses with the souls to become Legion, gaining regenerative capabilities in the process. However, the souls make him susceptible to the Penance Stare, which Blaze exploits to incapacitate Blackheart.

=== Video games ===
- Blackheart appears as a playable character in Marvel Super Heroes, voiced by Jaimz Woolvett.
- Blackheart appears as a boss in Marvel Super Heroes in War of the Gems.
- Blackheart appears as a playable character in Marvel Super Heroes vs. Street Fighter, voiced again by Jaimz Woolvett.
- Blackheart appears as a playable character in Marvel vs. Capcom 2: New Age of Heroes, voiced again by Jaimz Woolvett.
- Blackheart appears as a boss in Marvel: Ultimate Alliance, voiced by David Sobolov. This version is an associate of the Masters of Evil.
- Blackheart appears in the Ghost Rider film tie-in game, voiced by Robin Atkin Downes. This version can shapeshift into his film and comic book incarnations' appearances.
- Blackheart appears as a boss in Marvel Avengers Alliance.
