= Ghost Rider =

Character from Marvel Comics

- Johnny Blaze as Ghost Rider on the cover of Marvel Spotlight #5 (August 1972).

Publication information
- Publisher: Marvel Comics
- First appearance: Marvel Spotlight #5 (August 1972)
- Created by: Roy Thomas; Gary Friedrich; Mike Ploog

In-story information
- Alter ego: Johnny Blaze; Danny Ketch; Alejandra Jones; Robbie Reyes; Kushala; Sal Romero; Carter Slade; Parker Robbins
- Species: Human/demon hybrid
- Team affiliations: Ghost Riders; Thunderbolts; Midnight Sons; New Fantastic Four; Defenders; New Avengers; Marvel Knights; Dark Avengers; Champions; S.H.I.E.L.D.
- Notable aliases: Hell King; Spirit of Vengeance; Zarathos; Fallen Angel; Zadkiel
- Abilities: Zadkiel control; Nigh-omnipotence; Nigh-omniscience; Omnipresence; Reality warping; Time manipulation; Time travel; God-like strength, speed, stamina, agility, reflexes, endurance, and durability; Hellfire manipulation; Hellfire infusion; Hellfire constructs; Hellfire telekinesis; Hellfire storm; Sin manipulation; Soul manipulation; Soul reading; Soul cleansing; Soul consumption; Soul mutilation; Penance Stare; Invulnerability; Magic immunity; Reality warping immunity; Time manipulation immunity; Self-duplication; Supernatural awareness; Pyrokinesis; Size manipulation; Magic manipulation; Demon magic manipulation; Necromancy; Spirit possession; Elemental manipulation; Mystical chain projection; Resurrection; Immortality; Regeneration; Exorcism; Darkness manipulation; Interdimensional travel; Flight (Hell Cycle); Extrasensory perception; Teleportation; Occultism; Highly skilled motorcyclist and stuntman; Expert hand-to-hand combatant

Ghost Rider is the name of multiple superheroes appearing in American comic books published by Marvel Comics.

Marvel had previously used the name for a Western character whose name was later changed to Phantom Rider. The first supernatural Ghost Rider is stunt motorcyclist Johnny Blaze, who agrees to give his soul to "Satan" (later revealed to be an arch-demon named Mephisto) to save the life of his foster father. At night and when around evil, Blaze finds his flesh consumed by hellfire, causing his head to become a flaming skull. He rides a fiery motorcycle and wields blasts of hellfire from his body, usually from his hands. He eventually learns he has been bonded with the demon Zarathos. Blaze is featured in the series Ghost Rider (vol. 2) from 1972 to 1983.

The subsequent Ghost Rider series (1990–1998) features Danny Ketch as a new Ghost Rider. After his sister was injured by gangsters, Ketch comes in contact with a motorcycle that contains the essence of a Spirit of Vengeance. Blaze reappears in this 1990s series as a supporting character, and it is later revealed that Danny and his sister were Johnny Blaze's long-lost siblings. In 2000s comics, Blaze succeeds Ketch, becoming Ghost Rider again. In 2014, Robbie Reyes becomes Ghost Rider as part of the Marvel NOW! initiative. In 2024, Parker Robbins becomes Ghost Rider in the miniseries Ghost Rider: Final Vengeance.

In May 2011, Ghost Rider placed 90th on IGN's "Top 100 Comic Book Heroes" list.

Nicolas Cage starred as the Johnny Blaze incarnation of the character in the 2007 film Ghost Rider and its 2012 sequel, Ghost Rider: Spirit of Vengeance. Gabriel Luna and Tom McComas portray the Robbie Reyes and Johnny Blaze incarnations in the fourth season of the Marvel Cinematic Universe (MCU) television series Agents of S.H.I.E.L.D., with Henry Simmons and Clark Gregg portraying new incarnations Alphonso Mackenzie and Phil Coulson. Ryan Gosling will portray the character in the upcoming MCU film Ghost Rider (2028).

== Publication history ==
=== Johnny Blaze ===
Following the Western comics character who originally used the name, the first superhero Ghost Rider, Johnny Blaze, debuted in Marvel Spotlight issue #5 (August 1972), created by Marvel editor-in-chief Roy Thomas, writer Gary Friedrich and artist Mike Ploog. He received his own series in 1973, with penciller Jim Mooney handling most of the first nine issues. Several different creative teams mixed-and-matched until penciller Don Perlin began a considerably long stint with issue #26, eventually joined by writer Michael Fleisher through issue #58. The series ran through issue #81 (June 1983). Blaze returned as Ghost Rider in a 2001 six-issue miniseries written by Devin Grayson; a second miniseries written by Garth Ennis in 2005, and an ongoing monthly series that began publication in July 2006. Johnny Blaze was the son of Naomi Blaze and Barton Blaze. Naomi was the previous Ghost Rider.

=== Danny Ketch ===
The next Ghost Rider, a young man named Daniel "Danny" Ketch (Johnny Blaze's long-lost younger brother), debuted in Ghost Rider (vol. 3) #1 (May 1990). This Ghost Rider was nearly identical to the previous, although his costume was now a black leather biker jacket with spiked shoulder-pads, grey leather pants, and a mystic chain he wore across his chest, which responded to his mental commands and served as his primary melee weapon. His new motorcycle resembled a futuristic machine and the front of it could lower to serve as a battering ram. Like the original Ghost Rider's bike, the wheels were composed of mystic hellfire. Unlike the relationship between the previous Ghost Rider and the demon with which he was bonded, Ketch and his demon — who in (vol. 3) #91 (December 1997) is revealed to be Marvel's incarnation of the Angel of Death/Judgment — are cooperative with each other. At the close of the series with (vol. 3) #93 (February 1998), Ketch apparently died. The following year, however, Peter Parker: Spider-Man #93 (July 1999) revealed Ketch was still alive. Nearly a decade later, Marvel published the long-completed final issue as Ghost Rider Finale (January 2007), which reprints the last issue and the previously unpublished Ghost Rider (vol. 3) #94.

=== Alejandra Jones ===
During the 2011 storyline "Fear Itself", a Nicaraguan woman named Alejandra Jones becomes Ghost Rider through a ritual performed by a man named Adam. Though she demonstrates many previously unknown powers of the Ghost Rider entity, she is deprived of its full power when Johnny Blaze takes back most of this power in (vol. 7) #9. Jones was killed by Carnage during the Absolute Carnage event.

=== Robbie Reyes ===
In 2014, a new character took on the Ghost Rider mantle: a Mexican-American resident of East Los Angeles named Roberto "Robbie" Reyes, who drives a black classic muscle car reminiscent of a modified 1969 Dodge Charger rather than a motorcycle. Reyes was created by writer/artist Felipe Smith and designed by Smith and artist Tradd Moore.

=== Kushala ===
After witnessing the massacre of her tribe on an Arizona mountain in the 1800s, the Apache Kushala summons a fearsome Spirit of Vengeance. She uses it to exact revenge on those who took her family and friends, and learns to coexist with the inner demon that has just awakened—known as Spirit Rider. Kushala was created by Robbie Thompson and Javier Rodríguez and made her debut in Doctor Strange and the Sorcerers Supreme #1 (2016).

=== Sal Romero ===
During World War II, a soldier named Sal Romero operated as Ghost Rider after being reanimated as one after his death in order to protect someone named Leo. The Mother of Horrors summons Romero and other monsters to look for the Fractured Son, only for him to remain with Leo.

=== Parker Robbins ===
In 2024, a new character took on the Ghost Rider mantle: Parker Robbins, the supervillain "the Hood", in the miniseries Ghost Rider: Final Vengeance.

== Powers and abilities ==
The Ghost Rider is a human who can transform into a skeletal superhuman wreathed in ethereal flame and given supernatural powers. The abnormal motorcycle he rides can travel faster than any conventional vehicle and perform impossible feats such as riding up a vertical surface, across water, and leaping across great distances that normal motorcycles cannot. The Ghost Riders are virtually indestructible and notoriously hard to injure by any conventional means, as bullets and knives usually pass through them without causing pain (knives are shown to melt while in their body). It is possible that they are genuinely immortal, as it is said that God created them and only God can destroy them. Despite being composed of bone and hellfire, the Ghost Riders possess formidable superhuman strength, enough to easily pick up a truck and hurl it across a road. It has been stated that Johnny Blaze as Ghost Rider can bench press around 25 tons (50,000 lbs) (or more as seen in World War Hulk). Each Ghost Rider entity also had abilities specific to him or her.

Johnny Blaze
Originally when Blaze transformed into Ghost Rider, his body changed but not the clothes he was wearing. In his new incarnation, this is different and his clothes take on a different appearance with a spiked leather jacket and chains. As Ghost Rider, he can cause his motorcycle to transform and surround itself with hellfire or he can create a new cycle from pure hellfire. He is also capable of projecting hellfire as a weapon. His hellfire "burns the soul" without leaving physical injuries on the victim and its effects have been seen as similar to the "Penance Stare". In his new incarnation, Blaze is now possibly the most powerful hero on Earth. During "World War Hulk", Doctor Strange said Ghost Rider might be as powerful as the "Green Scar" persona of Hulk and could possibly defeat him. During this series, Doctor Strange also states that Ghost Rider protects only the innocent, which none of the Illuminati are. In later appearances, Blaze possesses the "Penance Stare" and wields a mystical chain, both of which were originally specific to Danny Ketch. Blaze also uses a shotgun and discovered that he can discharge hellfire from the weapon when he first encountered Ketch. Now, he also has new abilities including hellfire breath, the ability to produce chains from either his throat or chest, and the ability to travel between incorporeal realms.

Danny Ketch
When Ketch transformed into Ghost Rider, his clothes changed with him, taking on the appearance of a spiked leather jacket with chains with a collar, gray leather pants, and spiked gloves and boots. Likewise, his motorcycle underwent a radical transformation, changing from a conventional one into a high-tech motorcycle. This transformation was not strictly limited to the motorcycle he was found in the cemetery with as he was once seen able to transform another cycle in "Ghost Rider/Wolverine/Punisher: Hearts of Darkness". Along with flaming wheels that allow the bike to nearly fly across surfaces, the bike included a shield-like battering ram on the front. As the Ghost Rider, Ketch used a mystical chain which responded to his mental commands. It could grow in length, alter direction while in the air, stiffen into a staff or spear, and separate into several links which can strike like shrapnel and then return to their original form. Ketch's most famous power is the Penance Stare, which makes the target experience all the pain they had ever inflicted on anyone else.

Robbie Reyes
The ghost of Eli Morrow, who inhabits Reyes's body, is not a true Spirit of Vengeance. Regardless, he gives Reyes several abilities similar to that of other Ghost Riders, including the power to manifest and control chains ending in thin knives or sickles. The black muscle car that Morrow's ghost initially inhabits is linked to Reyes, allowing him to instantly teleport to or merge with the car. The car can also be driven remotely, and Reyes can pass harmlessly through it, allowing it to drive into foes. The car's trunk, when opened, acts as a portal, allowing the Ghost Rider to transport anything, including people, to any location. Though it is initially unknown if Reyes possesses the divine powers of his predecessors, he eventually displays the ability to use the Penance Stare during a battle with Star Brand. Morrow can take full control of Reyes's body when he gives in to his negative emotions, signified by a pallid skin tone and both of his eyes turning orange. Reyes can change into a more powerful and demonic form when sufficiently angered.

== Other Spirits of Vengeance ==
=== Naomi Kale ===
Naomi Kale is the mother of Johnny Blaze, Danny Ketch, and Barbara Ketch.

=== Noble Kale ===
Noble lived in the 18th century and grew up with his abusive father, Pastor Kale, and his younger brother Dante.

Noble fell in love with a black girl named Magdelena. Because of the color of her skin and his father's religious views, the couple kept their love secret. They were forced to tell Pastor Kale when Magdelena bore Noble's child. Noble and Magdelena were then married.

Shortly after the marriage, Magdelena discovered that Pastor Kale was a servant of Mephisto. To cover up Magdelena's findings, Pastor Kale accused her of witchcraft and had her burned at the stake. Knowing that Noble would object, Pastor Kale had him drugged, tortured and beaten.

Before Magdelena died, she used a curse to summon demons called Furies, who avenge wronged women. Fearing death, Pastor Kale struck a deal with Mephisto. In return for his safety, Mephisto would receive Noble's soul. Mephisto realized that Noble was attached to a piece of the Medallion of Power and he activated the piece to transform Noble into the original "Spirit of Vengeance". Noble destroyed the Furies, then killed himself after Mephisto attempted to force him into eating his son. Following Noble's death, Mephisto and his brother Uriel made a compromise that prevented Noble's soul from entering Heaven or Hell, remaining in the void.

=== Ghost / The Rider ===
The Ghost Rider of 1,000,000 B.C. was a caveman who gained heightened intelligence and the capability of speech due to the Celestial Progenitor influencing human evolution. He was approached by a mysterious stranger who possessed similar gifts, only to witness the stranger transform into a beast and kill his tribe. The boy was forced to survive on his own, though he does befriend a woolly mammoth. After almost dying in the harsh environment, he was approached by Mephisto, who bonded him with a Spirit of Vengeance. The Rider, along with his mammoth, eventually caught up with the man who killed his tribe, who turns out to have been the first Wendigo. Afterwards, Ghost was approached by Odin and Lady Phoenix to join the prehistoric Avengers.

=== Hellhawk ===
During the 11th century, a Native American chieftain from the Sioux nation named Hellhawk sported the powers of the Ghost Rider. He was part of Thor's Avengers of 1,000 A.D.

During the 17th century, Hellhawk developed a rivalry with Noble Kane. He was later killed by Narcosis to serve as a warning to Mephisto by Belasco to keep his Spirits of Vengeance out of Limbo.

=== Ghost Ronin ===
During Edo period Japan, the famed swordsman Musashi Miyamoto possessed the powers of the Ghost Rider and was known as the Ghost Ronin. He would assist the time-displaced Avengers when they fought against Mephisto throughout time.

=== The last stand of the Spirits of Vengeance ===
Seven Riders were introduced in a story arc by writer Jason Aaron and artist Tan Eng Huat. Daniel Ketch returns with a new mission: to collect the powers of all the Ghost Riders for the angel Zadkiel to prevent the corruption of the powers with their human hosts. Zadkiel has other motives he keeps to himself, for which he needs the powers of the riders to tear down the walls of New Jerusalem and wage war on the heavens.

=== Travis Parham ===
A version of Ghost Rider appeared in the 2007 miniseries Ghost Rider: Trail of Tears by writer Garth Ennis and artist Clayton Crain. Set during the American Civil War, it finds Confederate officer Travis Parham avenging the murders of his friend, an ex-slave named Caleb and Caleb's family. Parham meets a horse-riding Ghost Rider who seeks the same men. Eventually, Parham learns about the deaths instrumental in helping set forth the Spirit of Vengeance.

=== 19th century Ghost Rider ===
During the 19th century, an unnamed Ghost Rider was active during the American frontier. He targeted anyone who killed Native American women and children or who cut off their scalps.

== Supporting characters ==
- Roxanne Simpson-Blaze: Deceased wife of Johnny Blaze, revived as Black Rose by Blackheart.
- Caretaker: An immortal man and ally to Ketch, member of the Blood.
- Craig "Crash" Simpson: Roxanne's father and owner of one of the country's most popular motorcycle expedition shows, "Crash Simpson's Daredevil Cycle Show". One of his star performers and friends was cyclist Barton Blaze.
- Daniel: The youngest brother of Kazaan and Malachi, loyal to God.
- Ruth: A murderous angel from Heaven tasked to hunt and captures the rogue fallen angel Kazann.
- Witch Woman: An Arizonan Apache Indian woman named Linda Littletrees who made a deal with Mephisto.
- Malachi: A brother of Kazann and angelic commander. He returned the Ghost Rider to the mortal plane after being trapped in Hell to hunt down Kazaan with his brother Daniel's help and to win favor with God.
- Shriker: Jack D'Auria, an old friend of Danny Ketch and student of Yuri Watanabe who became an unrequited ally for Ketch against his foes.
- Sister Sara: The granddaughter of the Caretaker.
- Mary Le Bow: A Brooklyn paranormal investigator who has unrequited love for Danny.
- Uri-El: An angel of Heaven who is called the "bane of all demons".
- Gabriel Reyes: The handicapped brother of Robbie who helped raise him after their mother Juliana's death.
- Barbara Ketch: Sister of Danny and Johnny, daughter of Barton Blaze. Her death inspired Danny to become Ghost Rider.
- Barton Blaze: The late father of Johnny Blaze and a friend of Crash.
- Stacy Dolan: Childhood friend and love interest of Danny and Jack D'Auria, daughter of NYPD Captain Arthur.
- Brahma Bill: A fellow biker and friend of Johnny who briefly tries to seduce Roxanne.
- Talia Warroad: A young goth agent who appeared as a new ally of Johnny and eventually became his lover.
- Hoss: A demon who was in the service of Lucifer but sided with Ghost Rider.

== Enemies ==
- Aqueduct (formerly Water Wizard): A former soldier who gained the power to control water and was hired to kill Ghost Rider. He became a frequent opponent to the hero afterwards.
- Black Rose: Johnny Blaze's wife Roxanne Simpson-Blaze, who was revived as a servant for Blackheart and later married Ghost Rider Noble Kale.
- Blackheart: The son of Mephisto, Blackheart created a group of Spirits of Vengeance to battle Ghost Rider in the hopes of conquering Hell. Instead, Ghost Rider Noble Kale defeats him and takes over his portion of Hell.
- Blackout: A Lilin who worked under Deathwatch that frequently crossed swords with Ghost Rider. After the hero burned him to disfigurement, Blackout learned his secret identity and began killing his loved ones and acquaintances.
- Centurious: A servant of Mephisto who sought to battle Zarathos, Centurious was the head of the Firm and targeted Ghost Rider for his association with the demon.
- Deacon: An agent of Zadkiel given immense power to destroy Ghost Rider.
- Deathwatch: Daniel Ketch's archenemy. A Translord from an unknown demonic dimension posing as a crime boss in New York in an attempt to murder its residents. He later died at the hands of Ghost Rider, then was resurrected as a servant for Centurious.
- Doghead: Francisco Fuentes was an acquaintance of Danny Ketch who was murdered while walking his dog Chupi. He was resurrected by Blackheart, merged with Chupi, and became his servant.
- Death Ninja: An agent of Centurious who infiltrated Deathwatch's ranks and frequently battled Ghost Rider.
- Dormammu: A Faltine from another dimension who battles Ghost Rider in videogames.
- Exhaust: A parasite that transformed into an evil version of Ghost Rider.
- Hag and Troll: Demons under Deathwatch; they were his most loyal servants.
- Hoss: A demon tracker. Became an ally of the Ghost Rider in search of the angel Malachi, and known for driving a red Cadillac.
- Kid Blackheart: The future Antichrist who hoped to enter Heaven and destroy it.
- Lilith: An ancient immortal sorceress from Atlantis, Lilith gave birth to the Lilin over the centuries and was imprisoned until recently. Upon her freedom, she discovered many of her kind had been murdered by the Spirits of Vengeance and sought their demise. Her four most loyal children are Pilgrim, Nakota, Meatmarket, and Blackout.
- Lucifer: Lucifer, like the other Hell-lords, sought to remove the human component from the Ghost Rider in the hope it would become a mindless killing machine that would eliminate humanity. However, Ghost Rider proved too strong and Lucifer was exiled to Perdition. Later, Lucifer would be the demon-lord charged with torturing Zadkiel for all eternity.
- Madcap: A lunatic cursed with immortality and enhanced healing capabilities, Madcap has fought several of New York's heroes, with Ghost Rider one of his more frequent opponents.
- Manticore: A manticore-like supervillain with prosthetic legs.
- Mephisto: Johnny Blaze's archenemy. A demon who posed as the devil to claim Johnny Blaze's soul. Mephisto is the one responsible for bringing Ghost Rider into Johnny's life. Ghost Rider, however, is able to resist the evil that overcame him long ago, and is now able to use his powers for good no matter what. Angered, Mephisto sought revenge against Ghost Rider, and now constantly tries to win his creation back. Mephisto appears under the name Mephistopheles in the 2007 film Ghost Rider.
- Orb: Crash Simpson's (mentor to Johnny Blaze) partner in his traveling motorcycle stunt show, Drake Shannon lost most of his face in a challenge against Crash for the business. Given an eyeball-like helmet by They Who Wield Power that was able to hypnotize others, he returned to try and reclaim the stunt show, but was foiled by Ghost Rider. He would return as one of Ghost Rider's most frequent enemies.
- Scarecrow: A contortionist, Ebenezer Laughton decided to use his gifts as a thief. In time, he would turn to murder, eventually being brought into conflict with Ghost Rider and nearly killed from the encounter. The Firm turned him into an undead creature, bearing superhuman abilities and able to induce fear in others (whose fear could heal his wounds), setting him upon the Spirit of Vengeance again (and becoming a frequent foe).
- Steel Vengeance: Steel Wind's sister, Sadae Tsumura gave her soul to Centurious to save her sister after an encounter with Ghost Rider left her comatose. Sadae was turned into Steel Vengeance, a cyborg bent on killing Ghost Rider.
- Steel Wind: Following a freak explosion, Ruriko Tsumura was remade as a cyborg by Freakmaster and challenged Johnny Blaze at the Quentin Carnival in cycling, defeating him and earning a place amongst them. However, she ran the business into the ground and battled Ghost Rider, leaving her comatose. She was rehabilitated by Centurious and used as his agent. In time, she would, instead, become Ghost Rider's ally.
- Vengeance: A Spirit of Vengeance, Lt. Michael Badilino sold his soul to Mephisto to gain the power to destroy Ghost Rider (who he blamed for the death of his family). When he learned it was instead Zarathos, he became Ghost Rider's ally.
- Zadkiel: A renegade archangel who sought to usurp Heaven due to his hatred for God's admiration of humanity. Using Ghost Rider to kill other Spirits of Vengeance to empower himself, Zadkiel took the throne and cast out Ghost Rider. The hero would return with the dead Spirits of Vengeance to defeat Zadkiel and imprison him in Hell for all eternity.
- Zarathos: A demon bound to Johnny Blaze by Mephisto to become the Ghost Rider. He would, however, come to exert control over the entity, but ultimately would be separated from Blaze in the conflict against Centurious. He later renewed his alliance with Lilith.

== Alternate versions ==
=== Cosmic Ghost Rider ===
In an alternate reality where Thanos conquered all the universe, the Punisher signed a demonic deal with Mephisto and became the Ghost Rider. By the time he returned to Earth, Thanos was already gone and everyone on Earth was dead. Roaming endlessly and undying with no one to kill or love, the Ghost Rider spent the next countless years alone. He eventually began to lose his mind when even Mephisto fell silent to his calls. When a badly injured Galactus arrived on Earth seeking help against Thanos, Ghost Rider offered Earth to him in exchange for Galactus empowering him with the Power Cosmic.

=== Ghost Rider 2099 ===
Cover of Ghost Rider 2099 #2

Zero Cochrane, who in the Marvel 2099 alternate timeline is a cybernetic take on the Spirit of Vengeance, is a cybernetic being with a digitized copy of Cochrane's mind. He encounters a futuristic counterpoint to Michael Badilino's Vengeance. The Ghost Rider of 2099 appears to drop out of existence during the consolidation of the 2099 books into a single title called 2099 World of Tomorrow. He subsequently appears in the 2099 "epilogue" book Manifest Destiny.

=== Infinity Warps ===
In Infinity Warps, Ghost Rider is fused with Black Panther. Prince of Wakanda T'Challa was an arrogant boy who, because of his conflict with his father, was exiled from his place. He went to America and encountered Jericho Simpson (fusion of Brother Voodoo and Crash Simpson) who became his new father figure and gave T'Challa a new name as Johnny Blaze. During a stunt performance, he sensed his father T'Chaka dying and got distracted which resulted in his own death. He was then revived by Zarathos, half-sister of Bast and offered to him powers in exchange of eating the souls of sinners. At first, he was reluctant. When battling his father's killers, he accepted the offer and became Ghost Panther.

=== Marvel Zombies: Dead Days ===
Ghost Rider is seen in Marvel Zombies: Dead Days #1 (May 2007) as one of the uninfected; he then appears briefly in "Marvel Zombies" at the point in which the zombie heroes of New York are making their assault on the Silver Surfer. He later appears in Marvel Zombies 3 as an infected while chasing Machine Man and is then easily decapitated.

=== Old Man Logan ===
During the original "Old Man Logan" story arc that took place on Earth-807128, there is a scavenging biker gang called the Ghost Riders where they ride their versions of the Hell-Cycle. They attacked Logan and nearly beat him before they were killed by Hawkeye. Logan later fought some Ghost Riders and killed several of them, as one of them had their arm eaten by Bruce Banner Jr.

=== Otto Blaze ===
An alternate universe of Ghost Rider, with elements of Doctor Octopus, was introduced in the storyline "Devil's Reign". This version has chain-like tentacles.

=== Spirit of Vengeance ===
Autolycus, known as the Spirit of Vengeance, debuted in Guardians of the Galaxy as a member of the Galactic Guardians. He has the ability to traverse space and fire spike projectiles from his forearms. This Ghost Rider is a religious zealot, embittered toward a church proclaiming it would produce its god in the flesh.

=== The "Perfect" World ===
On Earth-11638, Spider-Man is called the Amazing Spider; he is rich, powerful, and popular, and none of his loved ones has died. Peter runs Parker Technologies, where his Uncle Ben spurs him to be his best. Upon inventing a portal technology, he unknowingly brought Earth-616's Spider-Man, Deadpool, and Hulk to Earth-11638. During a scuffle with Spider-Man in the Amazing Spider's lair, the Amazing Spider is rendered comatose. While comatose, the Amazing Spider encounters Bruce Banner, who helps him return to life as the Ghost Spider.

=== Ultimate Marvel ===
In the Ultimate Marvel Universe, Ghost Rider made his debut in Ultimate Comics: Avengers (vol. 2) #2. Ghost Rider's origin is explained in Ultimate Comics: Avengers (vol. 2) #4. During a cross-country trip across the United States, Johnny Blaze and Roxanne Simpson come across a bar where they befriend a biker gang, who ply them with beer. The gang's friendly demeanor is a ruse, as they kill the intoxicated Blaze as part of a Satanic ritual. During the ritual, they barter their souls with Satan in exchange for wealth and power. Satan grants their request, but maintains the upper hand. The deceased Blaze also makes a deal that Satan will get his soul in exchange for the assured safety of Roxanne. For 20 years, Blaze trains to become the Ghost Rider, burning away his Christian baptism, and is sent into the world to take revenge. He tracks down and kills the members of the motorcycle gang — now rich and in positions of power – individually. In response to these deaths, the White House issues an executive order to kill the Ghost Rider. When the Avengers are unsuccessful in stopping the Ghost Rider from killing his next target, the truth behind the Ghost Rider's selection of targets is learned. The Vice President of the United States, Robert R. Blackthorne is revealed to be the former leader of the motorcycle gang, who sold his soul to become a Ghost Rider, also known as Vengeance.

=== What If? ===
In the second volume of the series in issue #45, "What If Barbara Ketch Became Ghost Rider", Daniel Ketch's sister Barbara becomes the Ghost Rider after Danny is killed in the graveyard. In this version, Barbara is more vicious and ruthless as Ghost Rider. Eventually, Doctor Strange and Spider-Man team up to try to stop her with the help of Johnny Blaze.

== In other media ==
=== Television ===
- The Danny Ketch incarnation of Ghost Rider makes a non-speaking cameo appearance in the X-Men: The Animated Series episode "The Final Decision".
- The Danny Ketch incarnation of Ghost Rider appears in the Fantastic Four episode "When Calls Galactus", voiced by Richard Grieco.
- The Danny Ketch incarnation of Ghost Rider appears in The Incredible Hulk, voiced again by Richard Grieco.
- The Johnny Blaze incarnation of Ghost Rider was going to appear in The Spectacular Spider-Man. However, after Disney bought Marvel Entertainment, Sony chose to return Spider-Man's TV rights to Marvel, cancelling the series.
- An army of unidentified Ghost Riders appear in the Avengers Assemble episode "The Wastelands" as servants of the Beyonder and Ares.
- The Johnny Blaze incarnation of Ghost Rider appears in the Hulk and the Agents of S.M.A.S.H. episode "Spirit of Vengeance", voiced by Fred Tatasciore.
- The Johnny Blaze incarnation of Ghost Rider appears in Lego Marvel Avengers: Mission Demolition, voiced again by Fred Tatasciore.

=== Film ===
- The Johnny Blaze incarnation of Ghost Rider appeared in 2007 in a self-titled film, portrayed by Nicolas Cage as an adult and Matt Long as a teenager.
- The Johnny Blaze incarnation of Ghost Rider returned in 2012 in Ghost Rider: Spirit of Vengeance, portrayed again by Nicolas Cage.
- The Johnny Blaze incarnation of Ghost Rider will appear in the upcoming MCU film Ghost Rider (2028), played by Ryan Gosling.

=== Marvel Cinematic Universe ===
- Multiple iterations of Ghost Rider appear in projects set in the Marvel Cinematic Universe (MCU).
  - The Robbie Reyes and Johnny Blaze incarnations of Ghost Rider appear in the fourth season of Agents of S.H.I.E.L.D., portrayed by Gabriel Luna and stand-in stunt actor Tom McComas, respectively. This version of Reyes is empowered by the Spirit of Vengeance.
    - Reyes was planned to feature in a solo television series, which went unproduced.
  - In the Agents of S.H.I.E.L.D. episodes "Deals with Our Devils" and "World's End", the Spirit of Vengeance leaves Reyes and temporarily inhabits S.H.I.E.L.D. agents Alphonso Mackenzie (portrayed by Henry Simmons) and Phil Coulson (portrayed by Gregg) respectively, turning them into Ghost Riders in the process.
  - A samurai variant of Ghost Rider makes a non-speaking cameo appearance in the What If...? episode "What If... What If?".
  - Ryan Gosling will portray Ghost Rider in the upcoming MCU film Ghost Rider (2028).

=== Video games ===
- The Danny Ketch incarnation of Ghost Rider was going to appear in a self-titled video game by Crystal Dynamics as a 1997 release on the PlayStation until it was cancelled.
- The Johnny Blaze incarnation of Ghost Rider appears as a playable character in Marvel: Ultimate Alliance, voiced by Nolan North.
- The Johnny Blaze incarnation of Ghost Rider appears in a self-titled video game, voiced by Dave Fouquette.
- The Johnny Blaze incarnation of Ghost Rider in LittleBigPlanet via the "Marvel Costume Kit 2" DLC.
- The Johnny Blaze incarnation of Ghost Rider appears in Dante's ending in Marvel vs. Capcom 3: Fate of Two Worlds. He also appears as a playable character in Ultimate Marvel vs. Capcom 3, voiced again by Richard Grieco.
- The Johnny Blaze incarnation of Ghost Rider appears as a playable character in Marvel Avengers Alliance, voiced by Nolan North.
- The Johnny Blaze incarnation of Ghost Rider appears in Marvel Heroes, voiced by Mitch Urban.
- The Johnny Blaze incarnation of Ghost Rider appears as a playable character in Lego Marvel Super Heroes, voiced by Andrew Kishino.
- The Johnny Blaze incarnation of Ghost Rider appears as a playable character in Marvel Heroes, voiced again by Andrew Kishino. Robbie Reyes also appears as a "Team Up" character in the Marvel Heroes 2016 rebranding.
- An unidentified Ghost Rider appears in Disney Infinity 2.0.
- An unidentified Ghost Rider appears in Disney Infinity 3.0.
- The Robbie Reyes incarnation of Ghost Rider appears as a playable character in Marvel Avengers Academy.
- The Johnny Blaze incarnation of Ghost Rider appears as a playable character in Marvel vs. Capcom: Infinite, voiced again by Fred Tatasciore.
- The Johnny Blaze incarnation of Ghost Rider appears as a playable character in Lego Marvel Super Heroes 2, voiced by David Menkin.
- The Johnny Blaze and Robbie Reyes incarnations of Ghost Rider appear as separate playable characters in Marvel Puzzle Quest. Additionally, an original version of the character, Deadpool, also appears.
- The Johnny Blaze incarnation of Ghost Rider appears as a playable character in Marvel Ultimate Alliance 3: The Black Order, voiced again by Fred Tatasciore.
- The Johnny Blaze incarnation of Ghost Rider appears as a playable character in Marvel Strike Force.
- The Johnny Blaze incarnation of Ghost Rider appears as a purchasable outfit in Fortnite Battle Royale.
- The Robbie Reyes incarnation of Ghost Rider appears as a playable character in Marvel's Midnight Suns, voiced by Giancarlo Sabogal and Darin De Paul respectively. Additionally, Johnny Blaze appears as a supporting character, voiced by Graham McTavish.
- Johnny Blaze / Ghost Rider appears in Marvel's Deadpool VR, voiced by Eric Allan Kramer.
- Robbie Reyes / Ghost Rider appears as a playable character in Marvel Tōkon: Fighting Souls, voiced by Giancarlo Sabogal in English and Katsuyuki Konishi in Japanese. This version leads a team called the Samurai Outriders, consisting of himself, Blade, Loki, and Deadpool, in response to rescue his brother Gabe from the Elders of the Universe.

== Collected editions ==
- The New Fantastic Four: Monsters Unleashed (features a "new" Fantastic Four consisting of the Ghost Rider, the Hulk, Wolverine and Spider-Man) (trade paperback, 1992; reprints Fantastic Four #347–349)
- Essential Ghost Rider Vol. 1 (trade paperback, 2005; reprints Marvel Spotlight #5–12, Ghost Rider (vol. 2) #1–20 and Daredevil #138)
- Essential Ghost Rider Vol. 2 (trade paperback, 2007; reprints Ghost Rider (vol. 2) #21–50)
- Essential Ghost Rider Vol. 3 (trade paperback, 2009; reprints Ghost Rider (vol. 2) #51–65, Avengers #214 and Marvel Two-in-One #80)
- Essential Ghost Rider Vol. 4 (trade paperback, 2010; reprints Ghost Rider (vol. 2) #66–81, Amazing Spider-Man #274 and New Defenders #145–146)
- Ghost Rider Team-Up (trade paperback, 2007; reprints Marvel Team-Up #91, Marvel Two-in-One #80, Marvel Premiere #28, Avengers #214 and Ghost Rider (vol. 2) #27 and 50)
- Champions Classic Vol. 1 (trade paperback; reprints Champions #1–11)
- Champions Classic Vol. 2 (trade paperback; reprints Champions #12–17, Iron Man Annual #4, Avengers #163, Super-Villain Team-Up #14, and Peter Parker, the Spectacular Spider-Man (vol. 2) #17–18)
- Ghost Rider: Resurrected (trade paperback, 1991; reprints Ghost Rider (vol. 3) #1–7)
- Ghost Rider: Danny Ketch Classic Vol. 1 (trade paperback, 2009; reprints Ghost Rider (vol. 3) #1–10)
- Ghost Rider: Danny Ketch Classic Vol. 2 (trade paperback, 2010; reprints Ghost Rider (vol. 3) #11–20 and Doctor Strange: Sorcerer Supreme #28)
- X-Men & Ghost Rider: Brood Trouble in the Big Easy (trade paperback; 1993; reprints Ghost Rider (vol. 3) #26–27 and X-Men #8–9)
- Wolverine and Ghost Rider in Acts of Vengeance (reprints Marvel Comics Presents #64–70)
- Rise of the Midnight Sons (trade paperback, 1992; reprints Ghost Rider (vol. 3) #28 and 31; Ghost Rider/Blaze: Spirits of Vengeance #1-6, Morbius the Living Vampire #1, Darkhold: Pages from the Book of Sins #1, Nightstalkers #1 and Web of Spider-Man #95–96)
- Spirits of Venom (trade paperback, 1993; reprints Web of Spider-Man #95–96 and Ghost Rider/Blaze: Spirits of Vengeance #5–6)
- Ghost Rider: The Hammer Lane (trade paperback, 2002; reprints Ghost Rider (vol. 4) #1–6)
- Ghost Rider: Road to Damnation (hardcover, 2007; reprints Ghost Rider (vol. 5) #1–6)
- Ghost Rider: Road to Damnation (trade paperback, 2007; reprints Ghost Rider (vol. 5) #1–6)
- Ghost Rider: Trail of Tears (hardcover, 2008; reprints Ghost Rider: Trail of Tears #1–6)
- Ghost Rider: Trail of Tears (trade paperback, 2008; reprints Ghost Rider: Trail of Tears #1–6)
- Ghost Rider Vol. 1: Vicious Cycle (trade paperback, 2007; reprints Ghost Rider (vol. 6) #1–5)
- Ghost Rider Vol. 2: The Life and Death of Johnny Blaze (trade paperback, 2007; reprints Ghost Rider (vol. 6) #6–11)
- Ghost Rider Vol. 3: Apocalypse Soon (trade paperback, 2008; reprints Ghost Rider (vol. 6) #12–13 and Annual #1)
- Ghost Rider Vol. 4: Revelations (trade paperback, 2008; reprints Ghost Rider (vol. 6) #14–19)
- Ghost Rider Vol. 5: Hell Bent and Heaven Bound (trade paperback, 2008; reprints Ghost Rider (vol. 6) #20–25)
- Ghost Rider Vol. 6: The Last Stand (trade paperback, 2009; reprints Ghost Rider (vol. 6) #26–32)
- Ghost Rider Vol. 7: Trials and Tribulations (trade paperback, 2009; reprints Ghost Rider (vol. 6) #33–35 and Annual #2)
- Ghost Riders: Heaven's on Fire (trade paperback, 2009–2010; reprints Ghost Riders: Heaven's on Fire #1–6)
- Ghost Rider: Ultimate Collection by Daniel Way (trade paperback, 2012; reprints Ghost Rider (vol. 6) #1–19)
- Ghost Rider Omnibus by Jason Aaron (hardcover, 2010; reprints Ghost Rider (vol. 6) #20–35, Annual #2 and Ghost Riders: Heaven's on Fire #1–6)
- Ghost Rider: Danny Ketch – Addict (Ghost Rider: Danny Ketch #1–5 and Ghost Rider Finale)
- Fear Itself: Ghost Rider (trade paperback, Ghost Rider (vol. 7) #0.1 and 1–5)
- Ghost Rider: The Complete Series by Rob Williams (trade paperback, Ghost Rider (vol. 7) #0.1 and 1–9)
- All-New Ghost Rider: Engines of Vengeance (trade paperback, 2014; reprints All-New Ghost Rider #1-5)
- All-New Ghost Rider: Legend (trade paperback, 2015; reprints All-New Ghost Rider #6-12)
- Ghost Rider: Four on the Floor (trade paperback, 2017; reprints Ghost Rider (vol. 8) #1-6)
- Ghost Rider: King of Hell (trade paperback, 2019, reprints Ghost Rider (vol. 9) #1-4 and Absolute Carnage: Symbiote of Vengeance #1)
- Ghost Rider: Hearts of Darkness II (trade paperback, 2019, reprints Spirits of Ghost Rider: Mother of Demons #1, Ghost Rider (vol. 9) #5-7 and Ghost Rider 2099 (vol. 2) #1)
- Ghost Rider: Final Vengeance (trade paperback, 2024, reprints Ghost Rider: Final Vengeance #1–6)

== See also ==
- Hell-Rider
