= Ghost Rider (comic book) =

Name of multiple comic book titles

- Ghost Rider vol. 2 #1 (September 1973). Art by Gil Kane and Joe Sinnott.

Publication information
- Publisher: Marvel Comics
- Format: Ongoing series
- Genre: Superhero
- Publication date: (vol. 1); February – November 1967 (vol. 2); September 1973 – June 1983 (vol. 3); May 1990 – February 1998 (vol. 4); July 2001 – January 2002 (vol. 5); November 2005 – April 2006 (vol. 6); September 2006 – July 2009 (vol. 7); August 2011 – May 2012 (vol. 8); January – May 2017 (vol. 9); December 2019 – September 2020 (vol. 10); April 2022 – February 2024
- No. of issues: (vol. 1); 7 (vol. 2); 81 (vol. 3); 95 (vol. 4); 6 (vol. 5); 6 (vol. 6); 35 (vol. 7); 9 (vol. 8); 5 (vol. 9); 7 (vol. 10); 21
- Main character: Ghost Rider

Creative team
- Written by: (vol. 1); Roy Thomas (1), Stan Lee (1–4), Gary Friedrich (1–7), Dennis O'Neil (7) (vol. 2); Gary Friedrich (1–4, 6, 10), Marv Wolfman (5, 20), Tony Isabella (6–9, 11–15, 17–19), Bill Mantlo (16), Gerry Conway (21–23), Jim Shooter (23–27), Roger McKenzie (28–34), Jim Starlin (35), Michael Fleisher (36–66), Roger Stern (68–70, 72–73), J. M. DeMatteis (67, 71, 74–81) (vol. 3); Howard Mackie (1–69, Annual #1), Ivan Velez Jr. (-1, 70–93) (vol. 4); Devin Grayson (1–6) (vol. 5); Garth Ennis (1–6) (vol. 6); Daniel Way (1–19), Jason Aaron (20–35) (vol. 7); Rob Williams (1–9) (vol. 8); Felipe Smith (1–5) (vol. 9); Ed Brisson (1–7) (vol. 10); Benjamin Percy (1–21)

Ghost Rider is a comic book series featuring the character Ghost Rider and published by Marvel Comics, which debuted in 1967. By 2005, the comic had sold more than 45 million copies.

== Publication history ==
=== Volume 1 ===
Marvel Comics debuted the character Carter Slade in its Western title Ghost Rider #1 (cover-dated Feb. 1967) by writers Roy Thomas, Gary Friedrich and the co-creator of the 1950s version of the character, Dick Ayers.

=== Volume 2 ===
Following the Western title, the first superhero Ghost Rider, Johnny Blaze, received his own series in June 1973, with penciller Jim Mooney handling most of the first nine issues. Several different creative teams mixed-and-matched until penciller Don Perlin began a long stint with issue #26, eventually joined by writer Michael Fleisher through issue #58.

Tony Isabella wrote a two-year story arc in which Blaze occasionally encountered an unnamed character referred to as "the Friend" who helped Blaze stay protected from Satan. Isabella said that with editorial approval he had introduced the character, who "looked sort of like a hippie Jesus Christ and that's exactly who He was, though I never actually called Him that...." At the story arc's climax, Isabella had planned that Blaze "accepts Jesus Christ into his life. This gives him the strength to overcome Satan, though with more pyrotechnics than most of us can muster. He retains the Ghost Rider powers he had been given by Satan, but they are his to use as his new faith directs him." However, Isabella said, Jim Shooter, then an assistant editor,

took offense at my story. The issue was ready to go to the printer when he pulled it back and ripped it to pieces. He had some of the art redrawn and a lot of the copy rewritten to change the ending of a story two years in the making. 'The Friend' was revealed to be, not Jesus, but a demon in disguise. To this day, I consider what he did to my story one of the three most arrogant and wrongheaded actions I've ever seen from an editor.

Blaze's Ghost Rider career ends when the demon Zarathos, who inhabited Blaze's body as Ghost Rider, flees in issue #81 (June 1983), the finale, in order to pursue the villain named Centurious. Now free of his curse, Blaze goes off to live with Roxanne. Blaze occasionally appeared in the subsequent 1990–1998 series, Ghost Rider, which starred a related character, Daniel Ketch along with "Ghost Rider/Blaze Spirit of Vengeance", and two short lived solo ongoings called Blaze. This series revealed Blaze and Roxanne eventually married and had two children, but in the first Blaze ongoings comic, Roxanne was revealed to be a devil worshipper sent to spy on Blaze and their children killed in a failed by their mother to kill Johnny.

=== Volume 3 ===
The third Ghost Rider, Danny Ketch, debuted in Ghost Rider vol. 3 #1 (May 1990). The series ended with a cliffhanger in vol. 3 #93 (Feb. 1998). Marvel finally published the long-awaited final issue nine years later as Ghost Rider Finale (Jan. 2007), which reprints vol. 3 #93 and the previously unpublished #94.

In their review of Ghost Rider #80–85, Wizard gave the series their lowest possible rating, citing convoluted, tangential plots, dragged out fight scenes, and inappropriately cartoonish art.

=== Volume 4 ===
Blaze returned as Ghost Rider in a 2001 six-issue miniseries written by Devin Grayson, Ghost Rider #1–6 (August 2001 – January 2002).

=== Volume 5 ===
Johnny Blaze's continued journeys as chronicled in a six-issue limited series (November 2005 – April 2006) written by Garth Ennis, Ghost Rider: Road to Damnation.

=== Volume 6 ===
Johnny Blaze appeared as Ghost Rider in an ongoing monthly series that began publication with Ghost Rider #1 (September 2006) and ran until Ghost Rider #35 (July 2009).

=== Volume 7 ===
This series debuted with Ghost Rider #1 (August 2011) and ended with Ghost Rider #9 (May 2012).

=== Volume 8 ===
This series is a story about Robbie Reyes' relatively brief time as the Ghost Rider. This miniseries lasted for five issues (January 2017 – May 2017).

=== Volume 9 ===
This series featured both Johnny Blaze and Danny Ketch as the Spirits of Vengeance. It lasted for seven issues (December 2019 – September 2020).

=== Volume 10 ===
Johnny Blaze returns after "King in Black" with a scoured memory and hunting down demons in the American West while Agent Warroad accompanies the F.B.I. in steady pursuit. This series debuted with Ghost Rider #1 (April 2022).

== Collected editions ==
- Essential Ghost Rider Vol. 1 (trade paperback, 2005; reprints Marvel Spotlight # 5–12, Ghost Rider vol. 2 #1–20 and Daredevil #138)
- Essential Ghost Rider Vol. 2 (trade paperback, 2007; reprints Ghost Rider vol. 2 #21–50)
- Essential Ghost Rider Vol. 3 (trade paperback, 2009; reprints Ghost Rider vol. 2 #51–65, Avengers #214, Marvel Two-In-One #80)
- Essential Ghost Rider Vol. 4 (trade paperback, 2010; reprints Ghost Rider vol. 2 #66–81, Amazing Spider-Man #274 and New Defenders #145 and 146)
- Ghost Rider Team-Up (trade paperback, 2007; reprints Marvel Team-Up #91, Marvel Two-in-One #80, Marvel Premiere #28, Avengers #214 and Ghost Rider vol. 2 #27 & #50)
- Ghost Rider: Resurrected (trade paperback, 1991; reprints Ghost Rider vol. 3, #1–7)
- Ghost Rider: Danny Ketch Classic Vol. 1 (trade paperback, 2009; reprints Ghost Rider vol. 3, #1–10)
- Ghost Rider: Danny Ketch Classic Vol. 2 (trade paperback, 2010; reprints Ghost Rider vol. 3, #11–20)
- X-Men & Ghost Rider: Brood Trouble in the Big Easy (trade paperback; 1993; reprints Ghost Rider vol. 3 #26–27 and X-Men #8–9)
- Rise of the Midnight Sons (trade paperback, 1992; reprints Ghost Rider vol. 3, #28, 31; Ghost Rider/Blaze: Spirits of Vengeance #1, Morbius #1, Darkhold #1 and Nightstalkers #1)
- Spirits of Vengeance: Rise of the Midnight Sons (Trade paperback, 2022; reprints Ghost Rider vol. 3, #28, 31; Ghost Rider/Blaze: Spirits of Vengeance #1–6, Morbius #1, Darkhold #1 Nightstalkers #1, Web of Spider-Man #95–96 and material from Midnight Sons Unlimited #1)
- Ghost Rider: The Hammer Lane (trade paperback, 2002; reprints Ghost Rider vol. 4 #1–6)
- Ghost Rider: Road to Damnation (Hardcover, 2007; reprints Ghost Rider vol. 5 #1–6)
- Ghost Rider: Road to Damnation (trade paperback, 2007; reprints Ghost Rider vol. 5 #1–6)
- Ghost Rider Vol. 1: Vicious Cycle (trade paperback, 2007; reprints Ghost Rider vol. 6 #1–5)
- Ghost Rider Vol. 2: The Life & Death Of Johnny Blaze (trade paperback, 2007; reprints Ghost Rider vol. 6 #6–11)
- Ghost Rider Vol. 3: Apocalypse Soon (trade paperback, 2008; reprints Ghost Rider vol. 6 #12–13 and Annual #1)
- Ghost Rider Vol. 4: Revelations (trade paperback, 2008; reprints Ghost Rider vol. 6 #14–19)
- Ghost Rider Vol. 5: Hell Bent and Heaven Bound (trade paperback, 2008; reprints Ghost Rider vol. 6 #20–25)
- Ghost Rider Vol. 6: The Last Stand (trade paperback, 2009; reprints Ghost Rider vol. 6 #26–32)
- Ghost Rider Vol. 7: Trials and Tribulations (trade paperback, 2009; reprints Ghost Rider vol. 6 #33–35 and Annual #2)
- Ghost Rider: Ultimate Collection by Daniel Way (trade paperback, 2012; reprints Ghost Rider vol. 6 #1–19)
- Ghost Rider Omnibus by Jason Aaron (hardcover, 2010; reprints Ghost Rider vol. 6 #20–35 and Ghost Riders: Heaven's on Fire #1–6)
- Ghost Rider: Danny Ketch – Addict (Ghost Rider: Danny Ketch #1–5 and Ghost Rider Finale)
- Fear Itself: Ghost Rider (trade paperback, Ghost Rider vol. 7 #0.1 & #1–5)
- Ghost Rider: The Complete Series by Rob Williams (trade paperback, Ghost Rider vol. 7 #0.1 & #1–9)
