= Ghost Rider (Johnny Blaze) =

Marvel Comics superhero

Johnny Blaze Ghost Rider
- Textless cover of Ghost Rider #1 (November 2005). Art by Clayton Crain.

Publication information
- Publisher: Marvel Comics
- First appearance: Marvel Spotlight #5 (August 1972)
- Created by: Gary Friedrich (writer); Roy Thomas (writer); Mike Ploog (artist)

In-story information
- Full name: Jonathan "Johnny" Blaze
- Species: Human/demon hybrid
- Place of origin: Waukegan, Illinois
- Team affiliations: Avengers of the Supernatural; Champions; Defenders; Heroes for Hire; Legion of Monsters; Midnight Sons; Thunderbolts
- Notable aliases: Frank Ryder; King of Hell
- Abilities: Superhuman strength, agility, stamina, reflexes, speed, and endurance; Proficient in hand-to-hand combat skills; Highly experienced motorcyclist; Invulnerability to any kind of fire; Ability to project regular and ethereal flame; Ability to travel between interdimensional realms and along any surface; Immortality; Penance Stare; Resurrection; Use of enchanted motorcycle, chain and shotgun; Regeneration

Ghost Rider (Jonathan "Johnny" Blaze) is a fictional character appearing in American comic books published by Marvel Comics. He is the second Marvel character to use the name Ghost Rider, following Carter Slade (the Western comics hero later known as the Phantom Rider) and preceding Daniel Ketch, Alejandra Jones, and Robbie Reyes. The character's story begins when motorcycle stuntman Johnny Blaze becomes bound to the Spirit of Vengeance Zarathos after making a deal with Mephisto to spare his surrogate father. With his supernatural powers, Johnny seeks vengeance as the "Ghost Rider".

The character has been featured in various media adaptations, such as television series, feature films, and video games. The character was portrayed by Nicolas Cage in the films Ghost Rider (2007) and Ghost Rider: Spirit of Vengeance (2011), and Ryan Gosling will portray the character in the Marvel Cinematic Universe films Avengers: Secret Wars (2027) and Ghost Rider (2028).

== Publication history ==
Following the western comics character who originally used the name, the first superhero Ghost Rider, Johnny Blaze, debuted in Marvel Spotlight #5 (August 1972), created by writer Gary Friedrich, Marvel Comics editor-in-chief Roy Thomas, and artist Mike Ploog, with the name Johnny Blaze coming from Stan Lee. After a seven-issue tryout run in Marvel Spotlight, the character starred in a self-titled Ghost Rider series in 1973, with penciller Jim Mooney handling most of the first nine issues. Several different creative teams mixed-and-matched until penciller Don Perlin began a long stint with issue #26, eventually joined by writer Michael Fleisher through issue #58.

Thomas, Marvel's editor-in-chief at the time, described the character's genesis:

I had made up a character as a villain in Daredevil – a very lackluster character – called Stunt-Master ... a motorcyclist. Anyway, when Gary Friedrich started writing Daredevil, he said, "Instead of Stunt-Master, I'd like to make the villain a really weird motorcycle-riding character called Ghost Rider." He didn't describe him. I said, "Yeah, Gary, there's only one thing wrong with it," and he kind of looked at me weird, because we were old friends from Missouri, and I said, "That's too good an idea to be just a villain in Daredevil. He should start out right away in his own book." When Gary wasn't there the day we were going to design it, Mike Ploog, who was going to be the artist, and I designed the character. I had this idea for the skull-head, something like Elvis' 1968 Special jumpsuit, and so forth, and Ploog put the fire on the head, just because he thought it looked nice. Gary liked it, so they went off and did it.

Friedrich on the above, in 2001:

Well, there's some disagreement between Roy, Mike, and I over that. I threatened on more than one occasion that if Marvel gets in a position where they are gonna make a movie or make a lot of money off of it, I'm gonna sue them, and I probably will. ... It was my idea. It was always my idea from the first time we talked about it, it turned out to be a guy with a flaming skull and rode a motorcycle. Ploog seems to think the flaming skull was his idea. But, to tell you the truth, it was my idea.

Ploog recalled, in a 2008 interview:

Now, there's been all kinds of dialog about who was the creator of Ghost Rider. Gary Friedrich was the writer on it. ... The flaming skull: That was the big area of dispute. Who thought of the flaming skull? To be honest with you I can't remember. What else were you going to do with him? You couldn't put a helmet on him, so it had to be a flaming skull. As far as his costume went, it was part of the old [Western] Ghost Rider's costume, with the Western panel front. The stripes down the arms and the legs were there merely so I could make the character['s costume] as black as I possibly could and still keep track of his body. It was the easiest way to design him.

Tony Isabella wrote a two-year story arc in which Blaze occasionally encountered an unnamed character referred to as "the Friend" who helped Blaze stay protected from Satan. Isabella said that with editorial approval he had introduced the character, who "looked sort of like a hippie Jesus Christ and that's exactly who He was, though I never actually called Him that...." At the story arc's climax, Isabella had planned that Blaze "accepts Jesus Christ into his life. This gives him the strength to overcome Satan, though with more pyrotechnics than most of us can muster. He retains the Ghost Rider powers he had been given by Satan, but they are his to use as his new faith directs him." However, Isabella said, Jim Shooter, then an assistant editor, "took offense at my story. The issue was ready to go to the printer when he pulled it back and ripped it to pieces. He had some of the art redrawn and a lot of the copy rewritten to change the ending of a story two years in the making. 'The Friend' was revealed to be, not Jesus, but a demon in disguise. To this day, I consider what he did to my story one of the three most arrogant and wrongheaded actions I've ever seen from an editor." In 2020, Shooter said he had been concerned that this "basically established the Marvel universe is a Christian universe" and could alienate some portion of the readership by suggesting "that all other religions are false." He said after consulting with editor Marv Wolfman, he made the changes.

During his run on Ghost Rider, Isabella put Blaze in the lineup of his new superteam series, The Champions, in order to fulfill an editorial mandate that the team include at least one character with their own series. Bob Hall, who pencilled four issues of the series, later commented that "Ghost Rider never seemed to fit. Why on Earth would the ultimate loner be in a group? It must have been difficult to write and to me he always seemed like a different character than the Friedrich-and-Ploog guy." Ghost Rider remained with the series throughout its short run (October 1975 – January 1978).

Blaze's Ghost Rider's career ends when the demon Zarathos, who inhabited Blaze's body as Ghost Rider, flees in issue #81 (June 1983), the finale, in order to pursue the villain named Centurious. Now free of his curse, Blaze goes off to live with Roxanne. Blaze occasionally appeared in the subsequent 1990–1998 series, Ghost Rider, which featured a related character, Daniel Ketch. This series revealed Blaze and Roxanne eventually got married and had two children.

Blaze returned as Ghost Rider in a 2001 six-issue miniseries written by Devin Grayson; a second miniseries written by Garth Ennis in 2005; and an ongoing monthly series that began publication in July 2006.

=== Ownership contention ===
On April 4, 2007, Friedrich filed a lawsuit in the United States District Court for the Southern District of Illinois against Marvel Enterprises, Sony Pictures, Columbia TriStar Motion Pictures, Relativity Media, Crystal Sky Pictures, Michael De Luca Productions, Hasbro and Take-Two Interactive, alleging his copyrights to the Ghost Rider character have been exploited and utilized in a "joint venture and conspiracy". The lawsuit states that the film rights and merchandising reverted from Marvel to him in 2001. He amended the complaint on March 25, 2011. The case was transferred to the federal New York State Southern District Court on February 14, 2008.

The suit concluded on December 28, 2011, with Marvel prevailing on all but one count. U.S. District Judge Katherine Forrest ruled that Marvel Entertainment owned the character, saying Friedrich gave up any ownership claim when he signed checks containing language relinquishing all rights. She said Friedrich had also signed a 1978 agreement with Marvel relinquishing rights. Marvel countersued with the parties reaching a settlement in which Marvel dropped the suit in exchange for Friedrich paying $17,000 in damages, ceasing to sell Ghost Rider-related items of his own creation and ceasing to promote himself as the creator of the character for financial gain. Friedrich was allowed to sell his autograph on officially licensed Ghost Rider merchandise.

On June 11, 2013, Second Circuit Court of Appeals Judge Denny Chin overturned the original decision, calling the contract language "ambiguous" and sending the case back to trial. set for November. On September 6, Friedrich's attorney told the court both parties "have amicably agreed to resolve all claims."

== Fictional character biography ==
Stunt cyclist Jonathon "Johnny" Blaze is the son of Barton Blaze and Naomi Kale. He spent his early years in the Quentin Carnival where his parents starred in a stunt show with Craig "Crash" Simpson. Johnny's mother walked out on Barton and Johnny and took the family's remaining two children, Barbara and Danny, with her.

Losing his mother caused Johnny to repress many of his memories of her and his siblings. When his father died in a stunt, Johnny was adopted by Crash and Mona Simpson. The Simpsons helped Johnny by fabricating his past with the hope that it would be less painful than the truth. Now believing that his real mother was Clara Blaze, who had died, Johnny became an enthusiastic member of the Simpson clan, growing closer to their daughter, Roxanne. The two soon became inseparable and, as they grew older, their fondness for one another moved beyond familial.

Blaze would eventually join the Simpsons in their own traveling stunt show, the Crash Simpson Stunt Cycle Extravaganza. Crash had become a father figure for Blaze and, on learning of Crash's life-threatening cancer, Blaze turned to the occult. His studies led him to a spell which supposedly could summon Satan himself. Johnny was unaware that he had, in fact, summoned Mephisto. Desperate to save Crash, Blaze sold his soul to Mephisto in return for Crash's cancer to be cured.

Crash Simpson's cancer was cured, but he was subsequently killed in a stunt trying to jump over 22 cars. Mephisto, when confronted by Blaze over Crash's death, declared that he had kept his end of the bargain. Johnny's exact words in the bargain had been for Crash to be spared the cancer which was killing him, not for him to live. Blaze was saved by Roxanne when she proclaimed her love for Blaze, driving Mephisto away with the purity of her emotion.

Blaze was unaware that Mephisto had bonded him with the demon Zarathos as an act of revenge, and was transformed into a Ghost Rider, a leather-clad skeleton with a flaming head. While Johnny still had his soul, he was forced to punish the wicked and evil upon Mephisto's demands whenever needed. Whenever he was in the presence of evil he would transform into the Ghost Rider, to exact the devil's revenge, returning the evil to Hell. Blaze was not completely lost in the transformation however, and would also help the innocent when they were in danger.

Eventually, Zarathos would gain control of Johnny Blaze and the Ghost Rider would become the spirit of Zarathos unleashed. Johnny himself was becoming stronger as well, and the conflicting personalities led to a battle over Blaze's physical body. Centurious appeared, trapping Blaze's soul in his soul crystal. Zarathos, weakened from the ordeal used the last of his strength to shatter the crystal, freeing Blaze's soul and many others contained inside of the crystal. Before the crystal was reformed, Centurious was absorbed into the crystal. Zarathos followed him into the crystal, freeing Blaze from the curse, restoring his soul and ending his time as the Ghost Rider.

For a while, Johnny became a drifter and then an adventurer. He eventually became the owner of the carnival. In time, he learned of the existence of Daniel Ketch as the Ghost Rider. Believing the new Ghost Rider to be Zarathos, Johnny traveled to New York City to kill him. Johnny abducted Ketch and battled the Ghost Rider. Johnny became convinced that Ketch was not Zarathos and aided him against Blackout. Alongside the Ghost Rider and Spider-Man, Blaze then fought the Hobgoblin. He also helped Ghost Rider and the X-Men battle the Brood Queen.

He later teamed up with the new Ghost Rider to form the "Spirits of Vengeance". During this time Blaze would again ride a bike with wheels of fire and would sling a hellfire-spitting pump gun. Their mentor Caretaker would later reveal that Blaze and Ketch were brothers. In the team's first appearance, they battled Lilith and her Lilin.

A later confrontation with the forces of evil would lead to Roxanne's death. Blaze would later become a demon hunter, hunt down the demons responsible for her death and kill them all. Roxanne was later discovered to have been resurrected as, or simply transformed into, the being named the Black Rose. She was later returned to Johnny, despite memory loss, in the final issue of the Dan Ketch series of Ghost Rider.

Starting over, Blaze eventually found a new job as an accountant and a new girlfriend, Chloe, in the 2001 Marvel Knights series "The Hammer Lane". Though at first it seemed he was free from the curse, he would eventually transform back into Ghost Rider, since Zarathos had reconstituted himself in Johnny Blaze, despite being turned into a stone statue after his battle with the Midnight Sons.

Johnny Blaze soon found himself constantly pursued by the demons of Hell, intent on forcing him to make good on the demonic pact that he had made to Mephisto. It was all that the Ghost Rider could do to outrun the evil, but it was not enough. Eventually, Johnny was captured and taken to Hell. The Ghost Rider: Road to Damnation series, by Garth Ennis and Clayton Crain, finds Johnny Blaze trapped in an endless cycle of torture and escape in the Pit. It is here that the angel Malachi appears to the Ghost Rider, offering to free him from Hell with his soul intact, in exchange for hunting down the demon Kazann who has been unleashed upon the Earth.

Malachi tells Blaze that the only way he will be freed from Hell permanently is to beat the Archangel Ruth to Kazann, in order to stave off the destruction that she will cause should she fight him. Along the way, Blaze meets a demon, Hoss, who is also in pursuit of Kazann, and offers to help the Ghost Rider since they share the same goal.

Hoss and Blaze fight with Ruth and she steals his bike; they pursue her in Hoss' Cadillac. When they arrive to where Ruth is Kazann is already free, thanks to the efforts of a corrupt paraplegic business owner named Earl Gustav. Hoss and Ruth fight while Blaze battles Kazann, who lets Johnny know that he has been duped by Malachi. As this happens Gustav's secretary, Jemima Catmint, makes her boss recite an incantation that sends Kazann back to Hell. Johnny thinks that he is free, but gets shot in the head by a dying priest (whom he had blasted with hellfire earlier) with a holy bullet and is sent back to Hell. He confronts Malachi, who reveals that he tricked Johnny. Johnny threatens to kill him, but is prevented from doing so by Ruth, who kills him herself. Hoss appears and reveals that Kazann and Malachi were actually brothers, who passed information to each other about Heaven and Hell. Once Kazann escaped from Hell, Malachi needed to find someone (the Ghost Rider) to get him back before Ruth, in order to prevent Kazann from spilling the beans about Malachi exchanging secrets of Heaven with him while he was being tortured by angels.

In July, 2006, a new ongoing monthly series began with a story titled "Vicious Cycle", which was written by Daniel Way, with art by Mark Texeira and Javier Saltares (the same artistic team from the 1990s series). The storyline takes place after the Ennis miniseries and features Johnny Blaze finally escaping from Hell.

Blaze's escape is a plot engineered by Lucifer himself, as when Johnny escapes from Hell the devil comes with him. During a battle at a gas station, Blaze defeats the corpse of a recently deceased father that has been animated by the devil. Detecting the magical disturbance caused by Ghost Rider's escape, Doctor Strange investigates the situation, but believing Strange to be Lucifer in disguise, Blaze attacks him, and for the first time, he uses the Penance Stare, debilitating Strange. It is then that the celestial being Numecet appears and reveals the intent of Lucifer to Blaze.

Having healed Doctor Strange, Numecet tells Johnny Blaze that he is stronger than he can comprehend and is a vital part of Lucifer's plans, as he intends for the Ghost Rider to kill each of the bodies that he has possessed. It is revealed that when Lucifer traveled to the mortal realm his essence shattered and spread to 666 recently deceased people, each one of them resurrected and imbued with a portion of the devil's strength. In order to reform his body each one of the human hosts has to die, but they cannot die from suicide as that is a sin and would send the devil back to hell, requiring them to provoke others into killing them. As each one falls the remaining will become even stronger and Ghost Rider must kill them because, although others can kill the bodies at first, eventually the remaining hosts will become so powerful that no other being could kill them. Numecet attempts to dissuade Blaze but to no avail, Blaze vowing that he will force the devil into a single corporeal form and then drag him back to Hell once and for all.

During the "Civil War" storyline, Johnny ends up in Sleepy Hollow, Illinois where a serial killer is decapitating local children and soon learns his identity: the supervillain known as Jack O'Lantern. Killed by the Punisher, Stevie Levins' body is occupied by one of the several aspects of Lucifer. The local sheriff thinks Blaze is to blame but soon realizes the truth. Ghost Rider and the sheriff confront Levins/Lucifer at the door of a preacher's house, and after a short fight Ghost Rider tears out Levins/Lucifer's heart and smashes his head.

During the "World War Hulk" storyline, Johnny Blaze angers the Ghost Rider when he tries to save several people and allows the Lucifer fragment they were currently fighting to escape. Later after watching a broadcast on TV, Blaze decides to go to New York and fight the Hulk, against the Ghost Rider's will. The issue ends with Ghost Rider coming to a halt on his motorcycle in front of the Hulk. After attempting to urge the Hulk to stop, Ghost Rider engages the Hulk. Their battle is monitored by Doctor Strange and Mister Fantastic. Strange believes that the entity that supplies Ghost Rider's mystic power is possibly capable of defeating the Hulk, stating that his powers are limitless, and only inhibited by the human side of the Ghost Rider, even going as far as to call his powers "godlike". However, as it is Johnny Blaze, not the fully powered demon Zarathos who is engaging the Hulk, the Hulk easily defeats Ghost Rider. After Johnny is knocked out, Zarathos himself emerges and rides off because, as Strange says in the end of the issue, Ghost Rider only protects the innocent, which none of the Illuminati are.

Johnny eventually manages to defeat Lucifer by 'killing' one host by shoving a truck's gear-stick through its head and breaking its spine, leaving the host biologically alive but incapacitated. While the host is kept alive by Dixie, a trucker Johnny had encountered, Blaze tracks down what Lucifer believes is his final host and defeats it, exploiting the fact that Lucifer is only at half-strength. As soon as Johnny kills this host, Dixie and a group of local police are able to kill the brain-damaged Lucifer fragment – who now possesses the full soul of the devil but is in no condition to use that power – and send him back to Hell.

Seven Riders show their flaming heads for the first time in this story arc by writer Jason Aaron and artist Tan Eng Huat. Daniel Ketch returns with a new mission: to collect the powers of all the Ghost Riders for the angel Zadkiel to prevent the corruption of the powers with their human hosts. Zadkiel has other motives he keeps to himself, one of which he needs the powers of the Riders for: to tear down the walls of New Jerusalem and wage war on Heaven. The story begins in Tibet with Chinese soldiers harassing a village, questioning them about weapons that killed two of his garrison patrols. During the harassment a peasant enters on a donkey. After a few exchange of words and an order to kill given by the General, the peasant changes and kills the General's men while his back is turned. When the General turns back he sees the Ghost Rider and gets a Penance Stare for his trouble. After the attack the Rider goes back to his sanctuary where he is visited by Danny Ketch. A short while later Sister Sara and Johnny Blaze arrive at the sanctuary to find out how to get back at Zadkiel. After entering, they find the peasant and donkey burnt to husks.

That night, the two are visited by Ketch and begins a battle with a show of power. When Blaze does the Penance Stare to his brother, he sees exactly what has transpired. Ketch has murdered the hosts of numerous Riders for their powers. During a show of pity for the fallen, Ketch is able to return the Stare on Blaze and sends Blaze into temporary insanity. Before Ketch is able to take the power of Zarathos, he is stopped by the new Caretaker Sister Sara. She rescues Blaze and they go to a safehouse. At the safehouse, during Blaze's self-pity and Sara's trying to pick him back up, they are visited by two more Ghost Riders, the Arabic Molek and the Chinese Bai Gu Jing, whom they follow to Japan.

When Blaze's team arrives in Japan, they learn Ketch has already taken the power of the Rider Yoshio Kannabe. After the conquest, Ketch has another talk with Zadkiel via communications link. During the conversation, Zadkiel massacres the squad of the Asura who guard the gates of Heaven. Zadkiel tells Ketch to wait to attack the Riders until the last ones are together. Meanwhile, elsewhere in the world, former cop Kowalski follows a contact to get a hellfire shotgun for his revenge on Blaze.

After acquiring the item he is then driven to the middle of a desert to sit and wait for his chance. After leaving Japan, Blaze's team journeys to the City of the Skulls in the Congo where the last stand would be made. There they meet the Lords of the Congo, the Ghost Riders Baron Skullfire and Marinette Bwachech, and their Phantom Riders. During the day Sara tells Molek about her new experience becoming a Caretaker, and her wonders about religion, with which she is given secret information that Molek knows about both. As the Ghost Riders and their forces ready for battle, Blaze has his eyes opened by two children who go to participate in the fight. He quickly snaps out of his depression and joins the others for the final battle.

During the course of the battle, Baron Skullfire dies and the spirit is transferred to one of the Phantom Riders, after which Ketch creates hellfire duplicates of himself to take on the warriors. A wager is then made by Blaze and Ketch on a race between the brothers around the world for the fates of the powers. During the race, Blaze is critically injured by Kowalski's shotgun and Ketch takes the Rider from him as his duplicates overpower the others. Moments later, Ketch relinquishes the power of the Spirits of Vengeance to Heaven, with Zadkiel now able to storm it. The sound of the gates falling is enough to be felt by Spider-Man's spider-sense and loud enough to be heard even in Hell and Asgard. When an injured Blaze returns to the City of the Skulls, Ketch falls from the sky, revealing that the battle for Heaven has already been decided.

After the battle with Zadkiel and his Black Host, Johnny Blaze parts ways with Ketch and Sara. He eventually wanders to a Japanese village, living in the nearby temple. The villagers are suddenly invaded by demons and their flesh is transformed into heinous forms by a creature called the Skinbender. Blaze's attempt to fight back result in her trying to morph his flesh, but finds his skin burns to the touch due to his power, prompting her to demand that he transform into the Ghost Rider. When he does, she breaks down crying, claiming that he is the most beautiful thing she had ever seen and begs for him to speak. He simply responds with "Burn", leading a storm of fire to rain onto the village, incinerating the demons and restoring the villagers to their normal states. At the same time, Sara arrives in the village to reunite with Blaze to continue their quest against Zadkiel. She finds him in the process of grinding up the Skinbender, before tossing her into the sea. Sara then consoles Blaze, asking him to think of his family and asks where they are. He replies, saying that they are in Heaven. They then depart from the village to continue their journey.

The Antichrist, Kid Blackheart, after being hunted down by Zadkiel's agents on Earth, is saved by occult terrorist Jaine Cutter, despite Daimon Hellstrom's efforts to slay him. Eventually, the three encounter Johnny, Danny and Sara, and are forced to join forces in a desperate attempt to defeat Zadkiel in Paradise. Eventually, after reaching Heaven with Danny, he and Danny both attack Zadkiel, but are quickly overwhelmed; however, the spirits of Blaze's deceased wife and children encourage him to rise and continue to fight Zadkiel, rallying the combined forces of the Spirits of Vengeance (whom Ketch had been tricked into returning to Heaven by Zadkiel) against the renegade Archangel. After Zadkiel realizes that he was not, and never would be, the one true God, as Blaze tells him, "Only God can make a Ghost Rider, Zadkiel. You should know that. And only God can destroy one. You may have been able to shift that power around, to even leech it from its hosts. But you were never really able to control it. And you certainly couldn't kill it. You're not God, Zadkiel. You're just another power-mad wannabe who desperately needs his ass kicked. And that's exactly what the Ghost Riders are for", he is defeated and banished to Hell, with God, revealed to have never perished at all, reclaiming Heaven and thanking Blaze for all he did for Paradise and its billions of souls.

During the "Shadowland" storyline, Kingpin and Lady Bullseye perform a ritual which brings back Ghost Rider in a plot to attack the Hand. After Ghost Rider returns to Kingpin, he is forced to travel to Japan to confront the ancient ninja clan the Hand, and unable to directly combat them due to the Hand magic binding him, he provokes them into killing him. Blaze's soul emerges in a white void, and God, after telling him he is needed still, sends him back to the mortal realm, and, in gratitude for his role in defeating Zadkiel, aiding him by reinforcing him with a battalion force of Black Host warrior angels who are able to quickly slaughter the Hand ninjas with ease. Freed from the curse, Blaze rides off into the distance on his motorcycle.

During the "Fear Itself" storyline, Johnny Blaze becomes more agitated about his curse and is then approached by a mysterious figure known as Adam who claims he can help Blaze be rid of the Ghost Rider once and for all. Blaze was ambivalent to the man's gesture, thinking there was a catch to his offer, but Adam simply put that the curse will be passed to someone he never met. Blaze accepts the offer and was told to drive the Rider out of his soul. Blaze was finally rid of the Rider for good from then on while Adam went about his way to find a new host for the Ghost Rider. In Dayton, Ohio when Sin (in the form of Skadi) attacks the city, she fights a new female Ghost Rider. After the female Ghost Rider is defeated, Mephisto appears before Johnny Blaze stating that he has damned the human race and will help Johnny out.

Explaining that "Adam" was the original Adam, Mephisto reveals that the new Ghost Rider is a girl named Alejandra that Adam has raised in isolation for years, intending to use her to purge the world of sin, unconcerned about the fact that this will deprive humanity of free will. Despite his distaste at working with Mephisto for anything – the devil's motives clarified as being to preserve his own existence – Blaze is able to convince Alejandra to abandon Adam's plan after she renders an entire town catatonic. However, although Johnny was initially willing to let her serve as the new Ghost Rider, when her attempt to regain the town's lost sin nearly sends the world to Hell – her efforts only being narrowly defeated by the new Venom, Red Hulk (Thunderbolt Ross) and X-23 – Blaze is finally convinced by Doctor Strange to take back the Ghost Rider mantle, following Alejandra into Hell as she attempts to kill Mephisto and regaining the full power of the Ghost Rider, although Alejandra retains a fragment of its power for herself.

Much later, Ghost Rider joins Red Hulk's Thunderbolts to help take out Mercy, when she was unleashed. During a mission in which General Ross is searching for his missing men in an ancient temple in the South American jungles, the Leader incites a spell that momentarily removes the flame from Johnny Blaze. In the brief moment where he has lost the Spirit of Vengeance, Blaze is brutally torn apart and killed by a swamp demon. Ross is the only one to survive the mission and comes face to face with Mancuso, one of the men he was looking for that acquired divine powers. Mancuso gives Ross the option to either die on the spot or erase the mission from history. Ross chooses to erase the mission from the timestream returning Johnny Blaze to life.

Following several other missions, the Punisher quit the Thunderbolts, only to find that his safehouse had been booby-trapped and destroyed. Setting out for revenge on the Thunderbolts for the attack, Punisher attempted to slay the Ghost Rider with Mephisto's sword, which he got from Zadkiel. Ghost Rider thwarted this attempt, but ultimately Punisher was able to release Johnny from the Spirit of Vengeance by decapitating his flaming skull with his own chain. The curse once again leaves Johnny, only to return to him by the series' end.

In All New, All-Different Marvel, Johnny learns of the new Ghost Rider (Robbie Reyes) in East Los Angeles. When confronting Reyes, Johnny realizes that this new Ghost Rider is a body indwelt by two human souls. Once he finally learns the identities of these two souls – those being the soul of the serial killer Eli Morrow and his host, Robbie Reyes – Johnny decides to help Reyes learn how to be a true Ghost Rider by controlling his inner evil.

During the "Damnation" storyline, Ghost Rider joins up with Wong's incarnation of the Midnight Sons when Mephisto and Hotel Inferno manifest in Las Vegas. While the Midnight Sons and Scarlet Spider fight the demons, Ghost Rider rides his motorcycle to the top of Hotel Inferno to confront Mephisto. After Mephisto removes the Ghost Rider spell from Johnny Blaze, he throws Blaze from the roof, killing him. In Hell, Blaze finds the now-independent Spirit of Vengeance and persuades him to help reach Mephisto's throne. The two make their way through the circles of Hell until they reach Mephisto's throne. Upon Doctor Strange defeating him, Mephisto flees back to his realm, where he is defeated by Blaze and several Ghost Riders from across the multiverse. After Blaze sends Mephisto back to Earth, he is kept at the top of Hotel Inferno in countless restraints.

When a group of demons escape Hell through a portal, Johnny follows them in order to send them back. He encounters Danny Ketch fighting one of the demons he's hunting and the two talk about the Spirit of Vengeance, with Johnny disappointed that Danny does not embrace his role as Ghost Rider. He leaves after spotting a demon in a human disguise. After failing to get the location of the other demons, Johnny uses his damnation stare to kill it. His time in Hell has corrupted him, changing the Ghost Rider's skull to one with a horned and crown appearance. Johnny finds another demon who tells him the location of a huge demon gathering. Johnny kills it and proceeds to kill the others as well until Danny arrives to stop him, believing he's killing innocent people. The two fight and after a bike chase, Johnny strips the Spirit of Vengeance from Danny. Afterwards, Johnny ponders where to find the other demons and how they could have escaped Hell, coming to the conclusion that there is only one who can help him: Mephisto. Riding to Vegas, Johnny kills two more demons and arrives at the Hotel Inferno and is confronted by Wong. The two are attacked by more demons and afterwards, Johnny and Wong fight one another, with the former winning after chaining and using the penance stare on Wong. Johnny frees Mephisto from his prison and drags him in chains behind him.

== Powers and abilities ==
As a primal agent of Heaven, empowered by the Spirits of Vengeance, created by God's power to enact vengeance upon the sinners of mankind, Johnny Blaze is one of the most powerful entities within the mortal and immortal realms. The common theme of the Ghost Rider is a human host who transforms into a flaming-headed skeleton with a vehicle and supernatural powers. When riding their vehicles, they can travel faster than conventional vehicles and can maneuver impossible feats such as riding straight up a vertical surface or across water.

Initially when transformed, Blaze's motorcycle would simply catch fire. Later, he could create a cycle made of pure flame (hellfire). Hellfire is a supernatural flame which typically burns the soul and not the body, but also could be used as regular flame. Projecting hellfire as a weapon is his main form of attack. He also possesses heightened reflexes and superhuman strength, as well as almost total invulnerability to physical damage. Any damage he does take is quickly recovered, as Ghost Rider is made of pure hellfire, which he can use to immediately regenerate any lost limbs or holes in his body.

For a time, when Daniel Ketch was the Ghost Rider, Johnny did not have his typical powers. Instead, he wielded a shotgun that fired mystical force-blasts and rode a mystic motorcycle, both empowered by exposure to Ketch's hellfire.

In the newest incarnation of Johnny Blaze as Ghost Rider, another main weapon in his arsenal has been his chain, which was first used by the Danny Ketch Ghost Rider. The chain, much like the rest of Ghost Rider, is made of hellfire given a solid physical substance. Ghost Rider can control the exact movement of the chain with his mind, allowing it to do things normal chains cannot, such as reach vast distances and wrap around enemies without fail. The chain is seemingly unbreakable.

This incarnation's most powerful weapon is the Penance Stare. When he locks eyes with his victim, he can make them experience all the emotional pain and suffering that they have inflicted on everyone in their lifetime, permanently damaging their soul in the process. The only person known to have recovered from the Penance Stare is Doctor Strange, but this was under exceptional circumstances and required the aid of an angelic being to restore him to normal. The Punisher was able to resist the Penance Stare because he regretted nothing, which momentarily stunned the Ghost Rider.

The demonic entity Zarathos, which is the current source of Ghost Rider's power, has been described by Doctor Strange to possess sufficient mystical power to challenge the Green Scar incarnation of the Hulk. Zarathos is also able to re-manifest himself within Blaze when seemingly destroyed or exorcised, unless placed within a new host.

== Reception ==
In 2015, Den of Geek ranked Johnny Blaze / Ghost Rider fifth in their "Marvel's 31 Best Monsters" list.

In 2022, Comic Book Resources (CBR) ranked Ghost Rider 5th in their "Marvel: The 20 Fastest Speedsters" list.

== Other versions ==
- An alternate universe version of Johnny Blaze from Earth-21798 appears in Heroes Reborn. This version is a speedster known as the Ghost Runner.
- A zombified alternate universe version of Johnny Blaze / Ghost Rider from Earth-2149 appears in Marvel Zombies.
- An alternate universe version of Johnny Blaze / Ghost Rider from Earth-2301 appears in Marvel Mangaverse: Ghost Riders #1. This version is the sibling of Daimon and Satana Hellstrom and derives his powers from the former.
- An alternate universe version of Johnny Blaze / Ghost Rider from Earth-1610 appears in the Ultimate Marvel universe. This version gained his powers from Satan after being killed by gangsters who worshipped him.

== In other media ==
=== Television ===
- Johnny Blaze / Ghost Rider makes a non-speaking cameo appearance in the Agents of S.H.I.E.L.D. episode "The Good Samaritan", portrayed by uncredited stunt actor Tom McComas. While not referred to by name, Gabriel Luna, who portrayed Robbie Reyes, confirmed the character to be Blaze based on his appearance and powers. Blaze encounters the dead Robbie and his brother Gabe after they are attacked by a street gang, rescues them, and resurrects the former, turning him into the new Ghost Rider.
- Johnny Blaze / Ghost Rider appears in the Hulk and the Agents of S.M.A.S.H. episode "Spirit of Vengeance", voiced by Fred Tatasciore. This version can possess and take control of vehicles of all sizes and generate electricity.

=== Film ===
- Nicolas Cage portrays Johnny Blaze / Ghost Rider in the 2007 film, Ghost Rider and its sequel, Ghost Rider: Spirit of Vengeance, with Matt Long additionally portraying a teenage Johnny Blaze in the former. Cage was considered to reprise his role in the Marvel Cinematic Universe (MCU) film Deadpool & Wolverine, which ultimately did not happen as Cage was not able to return for an unknown reason.
- Ryan Gosling will portray Johnny Blaze / Ghost Rider in media set in the MCU, beginning with the film Avengers: Secret Wars (2027) and then in Ghost Rider (2028).

=== Video games ===
- Johnny Blaze / Ghost Rider appears as an unlockable character in Marvel: Ultimate Alliance, voiced by Nolan North.
- Johnny Blaze / Ghost Rider appears in a self-titled video game, which served as a loose continuation of the 2007 film of the same name voiced by Dave Fouquette.
- Johnny Blaze / Ghost Rider appears in LittleBigPlanet via the "Marvel Costume Kit 2" DLC.
- Johnny Blaze / Ghost Rider appears in Dante's ending in Marvel vs. Capcom 3: Fate of Two Worlds. He also appears as a playable character in Ultimate Marvel vs. Capcom 3, voiced by Richard Grieco.
- Johnny Blaze / Ghost Rider appears as a playable character in Lego Marvel Super Heroes, voiced by Andrew Kishino.
- Johnny Blaze / Ghost Rider appears as a playable character in Marvel Heroes, voiced by Mitch Urban.
- Johnny Blaze / Ghost Rider appears as a playable character in Marvel: Future Fight.
- Johnny Blaze / Ghost Rider appears as a playable character in Marvel Puzzle Quest.
- Johnny Blaze / Ghost Rider appears as a playable character in Marvel Contest of Champions.
- Johnny Blaze / Ghost Rider appears as a playable character in Marvel vs. Capcom: Infinite, voiced again by Fred Tatasciore.
- Johnny Blaze / Ghost Rider appears as a playable character in Lego Marvel Super Heroes 2, voiced by David Menkin.
- Johnny Blaze / Ghost Rider appears as a playable character in Marvel Ultimate Alliance 3: The Black Order, voiced again by Fred Tatasciore.
- Johnny Blaze / Ghost Rider appears as a playable character in Marvel Strike Force.
- Johnny Blaze appears in Marvel's Midnight Suns, voiced by Graham McTavish. This version is an acquaintance of the Caretaker and Doctor Strange who lost his wife Roxanne while guarding a page of the Darkhold.
- Johnny Blaze / Ghost Rider appears in Marvel's Deadpool VR, voiced by Eric Allan Kramer.
