= Mephisto (Marvel Comics) =

Marvel Comics fictional character

- Mephisto as seen on the variant cover for The Amazing Spider-Man #545 (January 2008). Art by Marko Djurdjevic.

Publication information
- Publisher: Marvel Comics
- First appearance: Silver Surfer #3 (December 1968)
- Created by: Stan Lee (writer); John Buscema (artist)

In-story information
- Species: Demon
- Place of origin: Hell
- Team affiliations: Six-Fingered Hand; Legion Accursed
- Notable aliases: Mephistopheles; Satan; Lucifer; Beelzebub; The Devil; The Lord of Evil
- Abilities: Superhuman strength, speed, durability, and stamina; Regenerative healing factor; Vast magic powers; Shapeshifting; Precognition; Immortality

Mephisto is a fictional character appearing in American comic books published by Marvel Comics. The character first appeared in Silver Surfer #3 (December 1968), and was created by Stan Lee and John Buscema and based on Mephistopheles: a demon character from the Faust legend, who has sometimes been referred to as Mephisto. Introduced as a recurring adversary of the Silver Surfer and Ghost Rider (Johnny Blaze), Mephisto has also endured as one of Spider-Man's most prominent adversaries, being responsible for Norman and Harry Osborn's respective transformations into the Green Goblin and Kindred; and for the superhero's loss of his marriage to Mary Jane Watson, considering their future daughter Spider-Girl his archenemy. The father of Blackheart, Jezebel, and Father Priest, Mephisto has often come into conflict with Doctor Strange, Doctor Doom, Scarlet Witch and other heroes of the Marvel Universe, being responsible both for the creation of the Cosmic Ghost Rider and the descendants of the Osborns, Phil Coulson, and Otto Octavius into villainy.

Debuting in the Silver Age of comic books, Mephisto has appeared in over five decades of Marvel continuity. The character has also appeared in associated Marvel merchandise, including animated television series, feature film, toys, trading cards, and video games.

Mephisto has been described as one of Marvel's most notable and powerful supervillains.

In the two Sony Pictures–produced Ghost Rider films, Mephisto was first portrayed by Peter Fonda in Ghost Rider (2007) and then by Ciarán Hinds in Ghost Rider: Spirit of Vengeance (2012), and more recently by Sacha Baron Cohen in the Marvel Cinematic Universe (MCU) Disney+ miniseries Ironheart (2025).

== Publication history ==
Mephisto's debut in Silver Surfer #3 (December 1968). Art by John Buscema.

Inspired by Mephistopheles of the Faust legend, he was introduced into Marvel comics by writer Stan Lee and penciler John Buscema, Mephisto debuted in Silver Surfer #3 (cover dated Dec. 1968), and was established as a perennial foe for the cosmic hero, also appearing in Silver Surfer #8–9 (Sept.–Oct. 1969) and 16–17 (May–June 1970).

Author Mike Conroy has described Mephisto as "the tempter who could offer the endlessly soul-tormented Silver Surfer the world, even dangling the Surfer's off-limits long-distance lover in front of him. As always the case with Lee's heroes, the Surfer's goodness and nobility won out, but Mephisto was only stymied, not defeated, and the pattern was set."

Mephisto went on to become a foe for the Norse god Thor in Thor #180–181 (Sept.–Oct. 1970), Astonishing Tales #8 (Oct. 1971) and Thor #204–205 (Oct.–Nov. 1972). He was later revealed to be the being to whom Johnny Blaze had sold his soul to and thus had been cursed to become the Ghost Rider, in a retcon that placed him in the role originally played by Satan. This was later retconned back to Satan, though Mephisto's influence is still felt in the 1990s by the Danny Ketch Ghost Rider.

Other appearances included posing as Satan in Marvel Spotlight #5 (Aug. 1972); tormenting the titular superhero team in Fantastic Four #155–157 (Feb.–April 1975) and Thor #310 (Aug. 1981) and 325 (Nov. 1982). Mephisto also guest-starred in two miniseries: The Vision and the Scarlet Witch (vol. 2) #1–12 (Oct. 1985–Sept. 1986) and Secret Wars II #1-9 (July 1985 – March 1986), before starring in the self-titled miniseries Mephisto vs. #1–4 (April–July 1987), battling four of Marvel's super-teams. The miniseries was penciled by co-creator Buscema.

In Daredevil #266 (May 1989), penciler John Romita, Jr. redesigned Mephisto, reimagining him as a bloated, naked creature with short, vaguely frog-like legs and a demonic-looking head. Romita explained "I couldn't see the Devil with tights and a cape." Subsequent portrayals have varied between Mephisto's original appearance and Romita's design.

Mephisto continued to torment the Scarlet Witch in Avengers West Coast #51–52 (Nov.–Dec. 1989); created a new adversary for the Marvel heroes in Daredevil #270 (Sept. 1989); and appeared in Marvel Graphic Novel No. 49 Doctor Strange and Doctor Doom: Triumph and Torment (1989). Additionally, he was featured prominently in the One More Day story line in The Amazing Spider-Man #544; Friendly Neighborhood Spider-Man #24; The Sensational Spider-Man (vol. 2) #41 and The Amazing Spider-Man #545 (Oct. 2007–Jan. 2008), rising to becoming the ultimate adversary of Spider-Man, making deals with Peter Parker, Norman Osborn, Otto Octavius, and Miles Morales.

In 2009, Mephisto was ranked #48 on IGN's list of Greatest Comic Book Villains of All Time.

== Fictional character biography ==
=== Introduction (1960s–1970s) ===
Mephisto is a perennial villain in the Marvel Universe, and is responsible for a number of evil acts, including capturing and holding the soul of Cynthia von Doom – the mother of Doctor Doom — until Doctor Strange and Doom freed her so she could ascend into Heaven. He was jealous of the worship of the fire demon Zarathos, so, posing as Satan, Mephisto creates Ghost Rider by bonding Zarathos to Johnny Blaze. Mephisto refers to his domain as Hell.

Mephisto claims to have been created, along with many other demons, by the supreme being whose suicide resulted in the creation of the Marvel Universe, as well as the Infinity Gems. He also claimed that his totally evil nature is because the supreme being did not choose to make him good, as that being had no concept of it.

=== Secret Wars II, 1980s and The Infinity Gauntlet ===
In Secret Wars II, Mephisto seeks to steal the Beyonder's powers or to destroy him to win the favor of Death. Mephisto sends an army of supervillains called the Legion Accursed to attack the Beyonder, who is saved by the Thing. After the Legion Accursed was defeated, Mephisto returned its members to where they were before he formed the group.

Mephisto creates a "son", Blackheart, from the collective evil energy in the town of Christ's Crown; a daughter, Mephista (who later renames herself Jezebel to separate herself from him); and a human son, Father John Priest. Mephisto later manipulates the sorcerer Master Pandemonium into gathering the five scattered fragments of his soul that were lost in an ill-fated encounter with Franklin Richards. When the Scarlet Witch attempts to use magic to conceive children with her husband, the android Vision, she unknowingly summons two of Pandemonium's soul fragments, which are born as her infant twins. The revelation of her children's origin, followed by their loss when they are reabsorbed into him, drives the Scarlet Witch insane.

In a series of confrontations with Ghost Rider, Punisher, and Wolverine, Blackheart kills Mephisto and takes over his portion of Hell. Mephisto survives, although as more of a ghostly apparition (claiming he had been denied a place in both Heaven and Hell), and for a time tricks the Silver Surfer into believing he was dead so as to collect his soul and thus perhaps regain his former power, but the Surfer refutes him and, with his allies, defeats Mephisto, resulting in his spirit form being seemingly destroyed.

Mephisto again survives death and soon finds himself with access to another universe: the Earth of the Top Cow universe. Seeking to torment an entirely new world of superheroes, he plots to enter this world and remake it for his own dark desires. Eternity senses this cosmic disruption and sends several heroes (Jennifer Kale, Wolverine, Ghost Rider, Silver Surfer, and Elektra) to that universe to confront Mephisto. Mephisto's resulting banishment to Earth-616 restores him to a tangible form, though without his elevated level of power.

=== 2000s ===
Mephisto steals Peter and Mary Jane's marriage

==== One More Day ====
Mephisto heals May Parker in exchange for changing the personal timelines of Peter Parker (Spider-Man) and Mary Jane Watson so that they never married, claiming he did so only because he hated their happiness. At Mary Jane's request, Mephisto erases all knowledge of Peter's secret identity, both learning only at the point of their memories being erased that their future daughter will be erased as well. During the process, Harry Osborn is also brought back to life.

It is later revealed that Mephisto foresaw a future in which Peter's daughter, Mayday Parker, overthrew him after his conquest of Earth. By erasing Peter and Mary Jane's marriage, Mephisto would prevent Mayday from being born.

=== 2010s ===
==== "Siege" ====
Mephisto had bartered part of his realm to the Asgardian death goddess Hela for 1,001 years in exchange for control for 101 days of the 13 surviving Dísir, dangerous evil predecessors to the Valkyries who were created by Odin's father Bor. This troubles the minions who had previously lived in this territory, and part of Siege Aftermath shows the "last stand of the perfidious diaspora" in what seems to have been a revolt. The revolt is quickly put down by the Dísir under Mephisto's command. The Dísir leader Brün tries to negotiate with Mephisto because she wishes to invade Hela's realm of Hel and feast on the souls of the Asgardian dead. Mephisto tells her that he has no interest in Hel, but he does not object to their invasion. Thor, trying to defend Hel and its dead, enters Mephisto's domain to find the Eir-gram, a magical sword that can harm the Dísir. Mephisto offers to give him the Eir-gram and a "happily ever after" for Asgard if he agrees not to interfere with one of Mephisto's plans. Mephisto grants him entry to Hell, but Thor must survive many difficulties before he finds the blade.

==== "Fear Itself" ====
Mephisto appears before a de-powered Johnny Blaze during the attack by Sin in the form of Skadi and states that he has damned the human race. Mephisto then states that he will help Blaze save the human race from the Serpent and the Worthy. Mephisto goes on a date with New Mutants member Magma; apparently confiding in her, he explains that, while he is the embodiment of one of the great forces of the universe, the force that created him also gave him desires and emotions, and he occasionally wants to do things that humans do. After speaking with the Gods at the Infinite Embassy, Mephisto heads to the Devil's Advocacy to speak with the other demons about the Serpent's threat on Earth.

Mephisto briefly appears to assist Deadpool in destroying one of his demon lieutenants, before taking a major part in the Hell on Earth War, where he apparently gives deathly visions of the future to Darwin and impersonates Rahne Sinclair's son Tier. This drives Darwin to begin hunting the actual Tier down. Mephisto is later defeated and replaced by Strong Guy as ruler of Hell. Red Hulk convinces Strong Guy to abandon the position of Hell-lord and try to regain his lost soul, allowing Mephisto to regain the throne of Hell.

=== The New Multiverse ===
==== "Damnation" ====
Mephisto finds out that Doctor Strange has restored the lives of the Las Vegas citizens who were killed in a bombing by Hydra. He orchestrates events that cause his demons to bring Strange to his recently created Hotel Inferno. Mephisto claims that the remnants of Las Vegas were in his realm before it was restored. As Hotel Inferno starts to affect the people of Las Vegas, Strange makes a deal with Mephisto to return the souls to Las Vegas if Strange defeated him in a game of blackjack. If Mephisto won, he would claim Strange's soul. Strange wins by cheating, but Mephisto learns of this and has Strange tortured. The possessed Avengers attack Mephisto, as Wong revealed that Mephisto rendering his throne vacant has enabled Johnny Blaze to overthrow him as ruler of Hell. Mephisto is imprisoned in Hotel Inferno, which is watched over by Wong.

=== 2020s ===
==== "Heroes Reborn" ====
After being killed by Deadpool and going to Hell after his death for unspecified war crimes, Phil Coulson makes a deal with Mephisto to be restored to life in exchange for his fealty, with Mephisto creating simulacrums of the Squadron Supreme for him to control as a United States-sponsored superhero team. After acquiring the Pandemonium Cube, Coulson uses it to rewrite reality in Mephisto's name, erasing the Avengers from existence and making himself the President of the United States. After his role in the reality change is discovered and he is defeated by Captain America, Coulson is imprisoned in the Pandemonium Cube by Mephisto as punishment and brought before 615 of Mephisto's alternate universe counterparts, with whom Mephisto proposes forming a "Council of Red" for multiversal conquest.

==== Masters of Evil ====
Mephisto approaches Doom Supreme and suggests to him that he put together a team to combat the Avengers. Doom Supreme takes Mephisto's offer and forms a multiversal version of the Masters of Evil consisting of Kid Thanos, Dark Phoenix, King Killmonger, Ghost Goblin, and Black Skull.

After the Council of Reds are decimated by the Avengers, Mephisto absorbs the last remaining member, claiming that the Council of Reds had served their purpose. As Mephisto returns to Earth-616 during prehistoric times, Kid Thanos informs him that Ghost Goblin and King Killmonger are dead, Black Skull was stripped of his Symbiote, and Doom Supreme and Dark Phoenix have fled. Mephisto is ultimately defeated and returned to Hell.

==== Avengers Academy ====
Mephisto seeks to reclaim Billy and Tommy Maximoff, the reincarnations of Scarlet Witch's children, but is unable to do so, as M'Kraan has taken them under her protection. Mephisto sends Blackheart after the children, but he objects to hurting the two as they are innocent. When Escapade uses her powers on Blackheart, she takes on his inner pain. Overcome with remorse, Blackheart allows the group to escape. Enraged at Blackheart's betrayal, Mephisto turns him into a human with decreased powers and sends him back to Earth, where Blackheart takes refuge at the Avengers Academy.

==== Avengers: Armageddon ====
During the "Avengers: Armageddon" storyline, Mephisto targets Doctor Doom following his death. After Mephisto learns that Captain America's soul is in Hell, Red Skull tells him to go after Captain America as well. Mephisto's latest demonic minion, Frenzah, is revealed to be Doom's old girlfriend Valeria von Frazen. Mephisto is convinced to abdicate Hell to Doom, who releases the condemned souls, destroys Mephisto's contracts, and restores Captain America to life.

== Powers and abilities ==
Mephisto is an extremely powerful immortal demonic entity possessing abilities used by manipulating the forces of magic. Mephisto can employ his power for a variety of uses, including superhuman physical attributes, shape-shifting and size-shifting, projecting illusions, manipulating memories, and altering time and reality. He is also highly resistant to injury. With his regenerative healing factor, Mephisto has the ability to recover quickly.

Mephisto is energized by sources of evil in the human realm, such as the alien Dire Wraiths. Like other demons, Mephisto is symbiotically linked to, and considerably more powerful within, his own realm, and Mephisto is able to transform the structure at will. If Mephisto's physical form is destroyed, he will regenerate and reform in his domain. Mephisto is known for acquiring souls, but cannot subjugate the will of another being without the victim's permission, which is usually done with some form of pact.

== Cultural impact and legacy ==
=== Critical reception ===
George Marston of Newsarama stated, "Mephisto may be one of Marvel's most iconic, enduring villains - and that's no surprise considering he's based on the archetype of the Christian devil, pretty much the most iconic 'villain' in religion, folklore, and in some cases, even as a metaphorical force in world history. Marvel's comic book take on the concept of an omnipotent, omniscient infernal manipulator who rules over his own realm of eternal punishment through treachery and torture has had a similar impact on the history of the Marvel Universe. Marc Buxton of Den of Geek called Mephisto one of the "greatest monstrous creations that ever sprang from the nightmares of the House of Ideas," writing, "You can't very well have a list of the most nefarious Marvel monsters without listing the devil, hisownself. Not really the Biblical devil, Mephisto is a netherworldly tempter, a soul broker, and a liar who pretty much serves the same exact purpose as the Devil but he won't get Marvel in trouble with Christian conservatives. Mephisto first battled the Silver Surfer in the Silver Age (HEY!) and has bedeviled (hiYO) just about every Marvel hero. He recently pissed off fandom by cutting a Faustian deal with Peter Parker and erasing Spidey's marriage. Mephisto was a key figure in The Infinity Gauntlet, constantly whispering Iago like in Thanos' ear and is the very symbol of corruption in the Marvel Universe."

=== Accolades ===
- In 2014, IGN ranked Mephisto 48th in their "Top 100 Comic Book Vilains" list.
- In 2015, Den of Geek ranked Mephisto 13th in their "Marvel's 31 Best Monsters" list.
- In 2017, Den of Geek ranked Mephisto 14th in their "Guardians of the Galaxy 3: 50 Marvel Characters We Want to See" list.
- In 2018, CinemaBlend included Mephisto in their "5 Marvel Villains We'd Love To See In Black Panther 2" list.
- In 2020, CBR.com ranked Mephisto 2nd in their "10 Most Powerful Comic Book Villains With Demonic Origins" list.
- In 2020, CBR.com ranked Mephisto 3rd in their "Marvel: Dark Spider-Man Villains, Ranked From Lamest To Coolest" list.
- In 2021, Screen Rant ranked Mephisto 4th in their "Mephisto & Every Other Marvel Comic Demon, Ranked By Power" list.
- In 2021, CBR.com ranked Mephisto 2nd in their "Marvel: 10 Strongest Demons In The Franchise" list.
- In 2021, Looper ranked Mephisto 4th in their "Strongest Supervillains In History" list.
- In 2022, Screen Rant ranked Mephisto 2nd in their "10 Most Powerful Marvel Comics Horror Characters" list, 4th in their "10 Most Powerful X-Men Villains In Marvel Comics" list and included him in their "10 Most Powerful Wonder Man Villains In Marvel Comics" list.
- In 2022, CBR.com ranked Mephisto 4th in their "Wonder Man's 10 Greatest Enemies" list and 6th in their "Marvel's 10 Scariest Monsters" list.

== Other versions ==
=== Cosmic Ghost Rider's reality ===
In an alternate future where Thanos conquered the universe, Frank Castle signs a demonic deal with Mephisto to become a Ghost Rider, becoming known as the Cosmic Ghost Rider after being bestowed with the Power Cosmic by Galactus.

=== Guardians of the Galaxy ===
In the Guardians' 31st century timeline, he has a daughter named Malevolence.

=== Marvel Mangaverse ===
An alternate universe version of Mephisto appears in Marvel Mangaverse. This version is the creator of Galactus.

=== Marvel Zombies: Halloween ===
An alternate universe version of Mephisto appears in Marvel Zombies: Halloween.

=== Universe X ===
An alternate universe version of Mephisto appears in Universe X. This version is a Deviant who is shaped by humanity's perception of him and evolved into a devil-like form after he was believed to be the Devil.

=== Ultimate Marvel ===
An alternate universe version of Mephisto appears in Ultimate Comics: Avengers.

== In other media ==
=== Television ===
- Mephisto was intended to appear in the proposed second season of Silver Surfer (1998), with his demonic nature toned down and made acceptable for children. However, the series was cancelled before it could air.
- Mephisto appears in the Marvel Cinematic Universe in the Ironheart episode "The Past Is the Past", portrayed by Sacha Baron Cohen. This version gave his hooded cape to Parker Robbins.

=== Film ===
- Mephisto, as Mephistopheles, appears in Ghost Rider (2007), portrayed by Peter Fonda. This version primarily appears in a human form, with glimpses of his true goat-like monstrous form appearing throughout the film, and employs a Ghost Rider as a bounty hunter. In the 1800s, he turned Carter Slade into his Ghost Rider to retrieve the Contract of San Venganza, but Slade betrayed Mephistopheles. In 1986, Johnny Blaze makes a deal with Mephistopheles to save the former's father from cancer in return for serving the devil at a future date, only for Blaze's father to die in an accident the next day. In the present, Mephistopheles transforms Blaze into his latest Ghost Rider to hunt down his traitorous son Blackheart before the demon can find the contract. After receiving help from Slade, Blaze defeats Blackheart and defies Mephistopheles by keeping his Ghost Rider powers instead of returning them, despite him offering to remove them.
- Mephisto, as the Devil, appears in Ghost Rider: Spirit of Vengeance. He takes the form of a man named Roarke (portrayed by Ciarán Hinds) and fathers a son with a woman named Nadya after saving her life. He attempts to possess the boy, Danny, and gain full access to his powers on Earth instead of relying on bodies that rapidly decay. However, Blaze protects Danny, who boosts Blaze's powers so he can send the devil back to Hell.

=== Video games ===
- Mephisto appears as a boss in Silver Surfer (1990).
- Mephisto appears as an alternate skin for Blackheart in Marvel Super Heroes vs. Street Fighter.
- Mephisto makes a vocal cameo appearance in Fantastic Four.
- Mephisto appears as a boss in Marvel: Ultimate Alliance voiced by Fred Tatasciore.
- Mephisto appears in the Ghost Rider film tie-in game, voiced by Kirk Thornton.
- Mephisto appears in Marvel vs. Capcom 3: Fate of Two Worlds via Morrigan Aensland's ending.
- Mephisto appears in Ultimate Marvel vs. Capcom 3 via Ghost Rider and Dante's endings.
- Mephisto appears as a boss in Marvel: Avengers Alliance.
- Mephisto appears as a playable character in Marvel: Contest of Champions.
- Mephisto appears as a playable character and boss in Marvel: Future Fight.
- Mephisto appears as a boss in Marvel Future Revolution.
- Mephisto appears in Marvel's Midnight Suns, voiced by Jason Isaacs.
- Mephisto appears in Fortnite.
- Mephisto appears in Marvel's Deadpool VR, voiced by Tom Cavanagh.
