= Tan Eng Huat =

Malaysian comics penciller

- Born: 1974 (age 51–52) Teluk Intan, Malaysia
- Areas: penciller, inker
- Pseudonym: Kutu
- Notable works: Doom Patrol
- Awards: Russ Manning Promising Newcomer Award, Eisner Awards 2002; Best Penciller and Inker, Eisner Awards 2004 (nominated)

Chinese name
- Traditional Chinese: 陳永發
- Simplified Chinese: 陈永发
- Hanyu Pinyin: Chén Yǒngfā
- Hokkien POJ: Tân Éng-hoat

Tan Eng Huat (Chinese: 陈永发; born 1974), also known as Kutu, is a Malaysian comics penciller and inker. After self-publishing comics in his homeland, Tan began a career in Western comics, starting with Doom Patrol volume 3 in 2001 by DC Comics.

== Biography ==
Tan was born in Teluk Intan and began working in the Malaysian comics industry in the early 1990s under the pen name Kutu (Malaysian for "lice") with publications such as Gempak, Genocide, and Red Hunter. His art style has been influenced by American, European, and Hong Kong wuxia styles. After meeting DC Comics publisher Andy Helfer at a conference on Asian comics in 2001, he was offered a job pencilling the newest incarnation of the Doom Patrol, written by John Arcudi. Doom Patrol was cancelled after 22 issues and Tan was offered work on The Authority and JLA for DC. After several years at DC, Tan started working for Marvel Comics in 2006 with Silver Surfer: In Thy Name and Ghost Rider. He has since relocated to Kuala Lumpur and continues to work with Marvel, specifically on X-Men projects.

== Awards ==
- Russ Manning Promising Newcomer Award, Eisner Awards 2002
- Best Penciller and Inker, Eisner Awards 2004 (nominated)

== List of works ==
- Doom Patrol (volume 3, December 2001 – September 2003, DC) #1–22
- Secret Files & Origins Guide to the DC Universe 2001–2002 (February 2002, DC) #1
- The Authority (volume 1, November 2003, DC/Wildstorm) #5 (collected in the trade paperback Harsh Realities)
- The DC Comics Encyclopedia (2004)
- JLA (February–April 2004, DC) #91–93 (collected in the trade paperback JLA Deluxe Edition, Volume 7)
- Batman: Journey into Knight (October 2005 – November 2006, DC) #1–12
- Judge Dredd Megazine (volume 5, November 2007, Rebellion Developments) #264
- Silver Surfer: In Thy Name (November 2007 – April 2008, Marvel) #1–4 (collected in the trade paperback Silver Surfer: In Thy Name)
- Ghost Rider (volume 5, August 2008 – April 2009, Marvel) #24–32 (collected in the trade paperbacks Hell Bent & Heaven Bound and The Last Stand and Ghost Rider by Jason Aaron Omnibus)
- Punisher (volume 6, August–December 2009, Marvel) #6–10 (collected in the trade paperback Dead End and Punisher by Rick Remender Omnibus)
- Superman: World of New Krypton (September 2009, DC) #5 (variant cover)
- Deadpool (volume 2, June 2010, Marvel) #22 (collected in the trade paperback Deadpool: Complete Collection, Volume 2)
- Vengeance of the Moon Knight (June–July 2010, Marvel) #7–8 (collected in the trade paperback Killed, Not Dead)
- Avengers: The Origin (July 2010, Marvel) #2 (Heroic Age variant cover)
- Official Handbook of the Marvel Universe A to Z Update (September 2010, Marvel) #3
- Thor: First Thunder (November 2010 – March 2011) #1–5 (collected in the trade paperback Thor: First Thunder)
- DC Comics Presents: JLA (February 2011, DC) #1
- Annihilators (May–August 2011, Marvel) #1–4 (collected in the trade paperback Annihilators)
- Thor: Asgard's Avenger (June 2011, Marvel) #1
- Deadpool (volume 3, 2011, Marvel) #4
- Annihilators: Earthfall (November 2011 – February 2012, Marvel) #1–4 (collected in the trade paperback Annihilators: Earthfall)
- Legends of the Dark Knight (volume 2, September 2012, DC) #15 (collected in the trade paperback Legends of the Dark Knight)
- Marvel Now! Previews (December 2012, Marvel) #1 (collected in Marvel NOW! Omnibus)
- X-Men: Legacy (January–February, May–July, and September–October 2013, January, March–May, 2014, Marvel) #1–3, 7–9, 11, 13–15, 19–20, 23–24, 300 (collected in the trade paperbacks, X-Men: Legacy – Prodigal, X-Men: Legacy – Invasive Exotics, X-Men: Legacy – Revenants, X-Men: Legacy – For We Are Many)
- Legends of the Dark Knight (volume 3, March 2013, DC) #4
- Liquid City (volume 3)
- Deadly Hands of Kung Fu (July–October 2014, Marvel) #1–4 (collected in the trade paperback Deadly Hands of Kung Fu – Out of the Past)
- AXIS: Revolutions (September 2014) #1
- X-Force (volume 3 December 2014 and February 2015, Marvel) #10, 13 (collected in the trade paperback X-Force Volume 2 – Hide/Fear)
