= Rattler (character) =

Marvel Comics supervillain

- Rattler as depicted in Battle Scars #3 (January 2012). Art by Scot Eaton (penciler), Andrew Hennessy (inker), and Paul Mounts (colorist).

Publication information
- Publisher: Marvel Comics
- First appearance: Captain America #310 (October 1985)
- Created by: Mark Gruenwald (writer); Paul Neary (artist)

In-story information
- Alter ego: Gustav Krueger
- Species: Bionically-enhanced human
- Team affiliations: Thunderbolts; Serpent Society
- Abilities: Wears electronic hearing aids in his cowl Bionic tail that generates sonic vibrations used to create shockwaves, deflect projectiles, or inducing vertigo, disorientation, unconsciousness, internal hemorrhaging, and possible death to people Fang-like teeth

Rattler (Gustav Krueger) is a supervillain appearing in American comic books published by Marvel Comics. He first appeared in Captain America #310 (October 1985), created by writer Mark Gruenwald and artist Paul Neary. The name Rattler was also used by two Marvel comics characters from the Wild West era, both enemies of the Rawhide Kid. A fourth Rattler appeared in the Spider-Man newspaper comic strip, who gained superpowers after being bitten by a snake and treated with experimental anti-venom.

Krueger, as Rattler, was given a long bionic tail that emits sonic shockwaves to mimic his reptile namesake. He first appeared as part of the Serpent Society, a team of snake-themed villains for hire. During their first mission, they were opposed by Captain America, who would have several run-ins with the Society. Rattler was one of the Society members who sided with Viper when she took over the group, but remained with the group after she was deposed. At one point he was part of the Thunderbolts, but returned to the Serpent Society. He remained a member when the Society was reorganized into Serpent Solutions.

== Publication history ==
Rattler first appeared in Captain America #310 (October 1985), created by writer Mark Gruenwald and artist Paul Neary.

== Fictional character biography ==
Rattler is originally from Germany and wields a bionic tail which he uses to create shockwaves and vibrations. During his initiation into the Serpent Society, Rattler is ambushed by Captain America, but uses his tail to protect himself and stop Captain America's shield from doing any damage. He later battles Captain America again after being tricked by the Porcupine, along with Diamondback, Death Adder, and Cottonmouth. During the ensuing fight with Captain America, Rattler uses his tail to send vibrations coursing through the hero's body, disorienting him. However, he is eventually thrown into a pillar by his tail, knocking him out. Alongside Cottonmouth, Rattler confronts Kingpin's men after Death Adder is murdered by the Scourge of the Underworld.

Rattler participates in the Serpent Society's mission to recover mystic objects for Ghaur and Llyra. After learning that X-Men member Longshot had found the missing artifact on his own, Rattler creates an avalanche by rattling his tail, taking himself and Longshot out.

Rattler remains a member of the Serpent Society under Cobra's leadership. After the group had captured and chained Captain America and Diamondback (really a Life Model Decoy) in this underground New York headquarters the pair escaped. S.H.I.E.L.D. subsequently took Rattler and the rest of the Society into custody.

Rattler joined the group of criminals aiding the Thunderbolts during "Civil War", alongside fellow Serpent Society members Cobra and Bushmaster.

In All-New, All-Different Marvel, Rattler appears as a member of Viper's Serpent Society under its new name of Serpent Solutions.

== Powers and abilities ==
Rattler possesses a 7-foot (2.1 m) long artificial bionic tail attached through surgery to his spine and lower back, which he can use for a variety of tasks, including grasping small objects, hanging by his tail, and as a bludgeon. He also has the ability to generate sonic vibrations by activating mechanisms in the "rattle" at the tip of the tail for various effects, including creating shockwaves, deflecting projectiles, and inducing vertigo, disorientation, unconsciousness, internal hemorrhaging, and possible death in opponents.

Rattler is 85% deaf in both ears and wears electronic hearing aids in his cowl. He possesses fang-like teeth.

== Other characters named Rattler ==
=== Heath Benson ===
Rattler

Publication information
- Publisher: Marvel Comics
- First appearance: Rawhide Kid #37
- Created by: Stan Lee; Dick Ayers

In-story information
- Alter ego: Heath Benson
- Abilities: Skilled athlete

Heath Benson originates from the Wild West time period and worked as an aerialist until he was injured in a fall. Unable to continue working, he is hired as a ringmaster for a traveling circus. Benson later becomes the criminal Rattler, looting towns and other settlers in the vicinity of his circus.

Two-Gun Kid confronts Rattler, but he escapes after the first encounter. Two-Gun Kid suspects the aerialist Whirlo of being Rattler and challenges him to aerial combat, which he ends up winning. Just then, the real Rattler shows up and challenges Two-Gun Kid to a rematch. Two-Gun Kid succeeded in knocking him out in aerial combat and unmasks him as Benson.

In 1876, Rattler joins forces with Iron Mask, Hurricane, Red Raven, Doctor Danger, and Fat Man in organizing a large number of criminals, having been inspired by the exploits of the cowboy heroes and the time-traveling Avengers. The West Coast Avengers travel back in time and assist Rawhide Kid, Two-Gun Kid, and Phantom Rider in bringing the criminals in.

=== Whirlo ===
Rattler

Publication information
- Publisher: Marvel Comics
- First appearance: Rawhide Kid #37 (as Whirlo); Two-Gun Kid #88 (as Rattler)
- Created by: Stan Lee; Dick Ayers

In-story information
- Alter ego: Unrevealed
- Notable aliases: Whirlo
- Abilities: Skilled athlete

As mentioned above, Whirlo was an aerialist who was suspected by Two-Gun Kid to be the Rattler. He was challenged to an aerial battle by Two-Gun Kid and was defeated.

After Rattler escapes prison, Whirlo claims that he is after him for revenge after failing to defeat Rawhide Kid. Two-Gun Kid figures out that Whirlo is posing as Rattler, tracks him down to the circus, and unmasks him. Whirlo claimed that he had attempted to get revenge on Rattler for framing him before.

=== Henry Bingham ===
Rattler

Publication information
- Publisher: Marvel Comics
- First appearance: Amazing Spider-Man Newspaper Strip
- Created by: Stan Lee; John Romita Sr.

In-story information
- Alter ego: Henry Bingham
- Abilities: Superhuman strength and speed

Henry Bingham makes his living from devenomizing snakes until he is bitten by a particular specimen. A chemist offers Bingham an experimental anti-venom serum to save his life, which transforms him into a reptilian form. However, Bingham finds that the changes are not permanent and begins seeking more samples of anti-venom to maintain his Rattler form. Rattler captures Spider-Man, who manages to escape. After finding Rattler, Spider-Man battles him, which ends with the anti-venom serum being destroyed. Rattler changes back to Bingham, who regains his sanity. Before dying from the side effects of the serum, Bingham thanks Spider-Man for saving him.

== In other media ==
An unidentified Rattler appears in The Avengers: Earth's Mightiest Heroes, voiced by Chris Cox. This version is a member of the Serpent Society.
