= List of Marvel Comics characters: D =

== Emmanuel da Costa ==
Emmanuel da Costa is the father of Roberto da Costa / Sunspot. He is an Afro-Brazilian businessman who was previously a "barefoot houseboy" who had the drive to be "a millionaire" and "an economic and political force to be reckoned with" Da Costa International. In addition, he also operates as the White Rook of the Hellfire Club. Da Costa was killed by Gideon, his former business partner.

== Nina da Costa ==
Nina da Costa is an American archaeologist and the mother of Roberto da Costa / Sunspot.

=== Nina da Costa in other media ===
Nina da Costa appears in X-Men '97, voiced by Christine Uhebe.

== Dagoth ==
Dagoth is a demon and spawn of Dagon who is an enemy of Doctor Strange.

In the storyline "Death of Doctor Strange", Dagoth raises the Sunken City of Kalamesh off the coast of Cornwall during the dimensional attacks by the Three Mothers. He is fed to the Peregrine Child by the Three Mothers.

== Dakimh the Enchanter ==
Dakimh the Enchanter is a wise but eccentric wizard who lived in pre-cataclysmic Atlantis, and who was the pupil of the sorceress Zhered-Na, who was banished from Atlantis by King Kamuu for prophesying that the continent would sink below the ocean. After starting a cult, Zhered-Na takes her favored disciple Dakimh and greatly extends his life span so that he ages at an extremely slow rate. While Zhered-Na dies, Dakimh survives the cataclysm that sinks Atlantis and escapes, continuing to live for centuries and maintaining the teachings of his mentor as her only surviving disciple.

== Maxine Danger ==
Maxine Danger is an employee of the Beyond Corporation who oversees the company's Super Hero Development Department. Danger enlists Ben Reilly to work for the Beyond Corporation as their Spider-Man, receiving sponsorship from them. Reilly fights Doctor Octopus when he attacks the Beyond Corporation's Manhattan branch, as Danger wants the Beyond Corporation's data drive secured. Danger has Reilly's memories manipulated to keep him from revealing sensitive information about the Beyond Corporation.

== Dansen Macabre ==
Dansen Macabre is an exotic dancer and a devoted worshipper of the god Shiva. She uses her powers to hypnotize Spider-Man into battling Shroud in an attempt to kill both of them. The pair manage to overcome her dances and defeat her. She briefly appears later as a captive of Locksmith, and is saved by Spider-Woman. Eventually, Shroud invites her to join the supervillain team Night Shift, which she accepts, later becoming co-leader of the group.

Dansen has the mystical ability to hypnotize or kill anyone who witnesses her dancing. She can also make herself undetectable to the human senses.

== Dar-Benn ==
Dar-Benn is a Kree general who used a robot of the Silver Surfer to execute Clumsy Foulup and General Dwi-Zann during The Infinity Gauntlet storyline. He was killed by Deathbird during the Kree-Shi'ar war.

=== Dar-Benn in other media ===
Dar-Benn appears in The Marvels, portrayed by Zawe Ashton. This version is a female Kree revolutionary who wields an Accuser's hammer and Quantum Band, and has a grudge against Carol Danvers for plunging the Kree homeworld Hala into a devastating civil war.

== Randall Darby ==
Randall Darby

Publication information
- Publisher: Marvel Comics
- First appearance: Captain America Annual #4 (1977)
- Created by: Jack Kirby

In-story information
- Alter ego: Randall Darby
- Species: Human mutant
- Team affiliations: Brotherhood of Mutants; Mutant Force; Secret Empire; Resistants
- Notable aliases: Shocker, Paralyzer
- Abilities: Bio-EM generation / manipulation

Randall Darby, also known as Paralyzer and Shocker, is a character appearing in American comic books published by Marvel Comics. Shocker was created by Jack Kirby and first appeared in Captain America Annual #4 (1977).

=== Fictional character biography ===
Randall Darby is a mutant who is discovered and recruited by Magneto to become a member of his Brotherhood of Evil Mutants, taking the code-name Shocker. After being abandoned by Magneto, Darby and his teammates come to be known as the Mutant Force. Under this name they work for the United States government and later the Secret Empire.

Darby changes his code-name to Paralyzer when the Mutant Force become the Resistants. The Resistants' protest against the United States' Mutant Registration Act is cut short by a clash with John Walker, who is Captain America at that time. Later, the Resistants revert to their Mutant Force identities and costumes.

Shocker lost his powers following the events of M-Day.

=== Powers and abilities ===
Darby can generate powerful fields of bio-electromagnetic energy from his body. He also has cybernetic claws of unknown origin in lieu of his hands and feet, and can channel his electrical energy through them into shock bolts or high-voltage fields of electromagnetic energy.

== Daredevil ==
Daredevil is the name of several characters appearing in American comic books published by Marvel Comics.

=== Danny Rand ===
Danny Rand posed as Daredevil to fool the public and protect Matt Murdock's secret identity.

=== Ray Connor ===
An Ultimate Marvel iteration of Daredevil, Raymond "Ray" Connor, appears in Ultimate Comics: Avengers following the death of the original Daredevil Matt Murdock. He is a youth who is discovered and trained by Stick after experiencing an accident similar to the one behind his predecessor's powers. Sometime after being publicly known as the new Daredevil, he and Stick are attacked by Vampire X's vampires and converted into vampires. Luring the Avengers to their sewer, Daredevil bites Captain America. As Daredevil is about to kill Blade, Captain America teleports the Triskelion to the desert of Iran using Perun's hammer, killing Connor.

== Daredevil 2099 ==
Daredevil 2099 is the name of several characters in Marvel Comics.

=== Samuel Fisk ===
The Marvel Knights Daredevil 2099 is Samuel Fisk, the grandson of Wilson Fisk. He feels some remorse over his grandfather's actions and carries on the legacy of Daredevil, as well as the Kingpin legacy he inherited.

In the reconstructed Marvel 2099 continuity of Earth-2099, Daredevil is shown to be a member of the 2099 version of the Avengers before he is killed by the 2099 version of the Masters of Evil.

=== Eric Nelson ===
The one-shot 2099 A.D. Genesis (Jan. 1996) introduced a Marvel 2099 version of Daredevil, opposing the corporate criminals of Alchemax in a futuristic New York. His real identity is Eric Nelson, grandson of Matt Murdock's longtime associate Foggy Nelson.

In the reconstructed Marvel 2099 continuity of Earth-2099, Eric Nelson only entered humanity while operating as Daredevil.

== Dark-Crawler ==
The Dark-Crawler, formerly known as the Night-Crawler (unrelated to the X-Men superhero Nightcrawler), which first appeared in Incredible Hulk #126 (1970), is a large extradimensional humanoid being with a tail. He is originally from a "dark dimension" (not related to Dormammu's dimension). He later becomes master of the Undying Ones' dimension after defeating the Nameless One.

== Darter ==
Darter (Randy Vale) is a minor villain in Marvel Comics. The character, created by Bill Mantlo and Jim Mooney, first appeared in Peter Parker, the Spectacular Spider-Man #29 (April 1979).

Randy Vale is an undergraduate at Empire State University. One day, Randy accidentally stumbles across a clone casket that once belonged to Miles Warren. The casket opens to reveal a decayed clone named Carrion. Upon learning of his creator's death, Carrion offers a partnership with Randy to get revenge on Spider-Man. In return Randy is offered power, but it is not specified what exactly the power entails. Randy dons a high tech uniform and goes by the name Darter. As Darter, Randy can glide through the air and fire lasers at his enemies. His first fight is with White Tiger who he manages to knock down. Later, the two fight again in a gymnasium where Spider-Man and Carrion are fighting. When Carrion flees with Spider-Man, Randy realizes that he was betrayed by his master and swears revenge on Carrion. He encounters his master while trying to drain the life from Spider-Man. Randy tries to attack Carrion, but he is hit with the red death, causing him to rapidly deteriorate and die.

=== Darter in other media ===
Randy Vale appears in Spider-Man: Homecoming, portrayed by Christopher Berry. This version is an employee of Adrian Toomes' salvaging company who becomes a criminal after the Department of Damage Control's formation causes the company to go out of business.

== Jeff Morales ==
- Further reading: Jefferson Davis at the Comic Book DB (archived from the original); Jefferson Davis at the Grand Comics Database

Jeff Morales (originally known as Jefferson Davis) is a character appearing in Marvel Comics' Ultimate Marvel line of books set in a universe and continuity separate from the mainstream Marvel Universe. The character was created by Brian Michael Bendis and Sara Pichelli, and first appeared in Ultimate Comics Spider-Man #1 (November 2011). He is the father of Miles Morales / Spider-Man.

=== Fictional character biography ===
Jefferson is an African-American man who is married to the Puerto Rican woman Rio Morales. He does not get along with his criminal brother Aaron Davis. Things get out of control and Jefferson winds up in jail, only to be bailed out by Nick Fury. Impressed with his fighting skills, Fury has Jefferson join gangster Turk Barrett's gang for intel, eventually working his way up to Wilson Fisk's criminal empire. Afterwards, Jefferson is offered a spot in S.H.I.E.L.D. but chooses to live a simple life of being a husband to Rio and father to Miles. Jefferson keeps Miles from ever interacting with Aaron and keeps a strict household in an attempt to lead his son on a clean path. Despite his overall dislike of Aaron's criminal activities, Jefferson is saddened by his brother's subsequent death.

During the events of United We Stand, Jefferson is arrested by S.H.I.E.L.D. only to be attacked by Hydra who attempt to get Jefferson to join. He instead kills his would-be recruiters and returns home to Rio. He tells his wife what happened and they go looking for Miles, finding their son at Ganke Lee's house. Jefferson is later attacked by Conrad Marcus, putting him in the hospital. He is attacked again, but Spider-Man battles and defeats Venom at the cost of Rio's life. One year later, Jefferson discovers that Miles is Spider-Man, angering him and blaming his son for the deaths of Aaron and Rio. Jefferson apologizes and reveals his own past to his son.

After the events of Secret Wars, Molecule Man transfers Miles, Ganke and their families to Earth-616 and resurrects Rio and Aaron. Jefferson later legally changes his name from Jefferson Davis to Jeff Morales, to distance himself from his time as a S.H.I.E.L.D. agent and the Confederate president of the same name.

=== Jefferson Davis in other media ===
- Jefferson Davis appears in Spider-Man (2017), voiced by Alex Désert.
- Jefferson Davis appears in Spider-Man: Into the Spider-Verse, voiced by Brian Tyree Henry. This version is a police officer who has a healthy relationship with Miles, though he has high expectations for his son. Additionally, Jefferson is initially unaware of Aaron's criminal career as the Prowler, but is still not keen on Miles spending time with his brother. After Aaron is killed by the Kingpin, the distraught Jefferson initially believes his brother's killer to be the new Spider-Man. He later reconciles with Miles, unknowingly inspiring his son to avenge Aaron by defeating the Kingpin. Following the Kingpin's arrest, Jefferson accepts the new Spider-Man's heroic efforts.
  - Jefferson appears in Spider-Man: Across the Spider-Verse, voiced again by Brian Tyree Henry. In-between films, he began going by Jeff Morales and tolerates working with Spider-Man while he and his wife Rio struggle to raise Miles due to his son's work as Spider-Man affecting his civilian life.
- Jefferson Davis appears in Insomniac Games' Spider-Man series, voiced by Russell Richardson. This version is an NYPD officer.
  - Introduced in Marvel's Spider-Man, Jefferson aids the original Spider-Man's investigation into the Kingpin's abandoned assets and prevents them from falling into Mister Negative's hands. After rescuing Spider-Man and receiving public recognition for it, Jefferson and his family attend Norman Osborn's mayoral re-election rally, where Jefferson is lauded for his heroism until Mister Negative and the Inner Demons launch a terrorist attack, during which Jefferson sacrifices himself to save another officer from a suicide bomber. Miles eventually comes to terms with his father's death with help from Rio and accepts Peter Parker's offer to work part-time at a F.E.A.S.T. center to further cope with the loss and honor his father's legacy.
  - In Marvel's Spider-Man: Miles Morales, it is revealed that Jefferson had been estranged from Aaron after discovering his brother is the Prowler. Jefferson agreed not to arrest Aaron, but demanded that his brother stay away from his family. The brothers never reconciled before Jefferson's death, leaving Aaron deeply affected and overprotective of Miles. Jefferson also makes vocal cameos in a flashback in the main story and a side mission, in which Miles goes on a scavenger hunt that Jefferson made for his birthday before his death.
  - In Marvel's Spider-Man 2, Jefferson makes a minor appearance during a dream sequence experienced by Miles.
- Jeff Morales appears in Spidey and His Amazing Friends, voiced by Eugene Byrd.

== Leonardo da Vinci ==
- First appearance: Astonishing #54 (October 1956)
- Created by: Carl Wessler, Bob Forgione
- Teams: Brotherhood of the Shield
- Abilities: Genius-level intellect
- Aliases: Aries, D.E.A.T.H. (Da Vinci Elevating Agents To Helm)
- Further reading: Leonardo da Vinci at the Comic Book DB (archived from the original)

Leonardo da Vinci is a fictionalized depiction of the Italian polymath of the same name. He was created by Carl Wessler and Bob Forgione and first appeared in Astonishing #54.

Leonardo was born in Vinci, as the son of Caterina and Piero Fruosino di Antonio da Vinci. He is one of the thinkers spawned by the Renaissance, and becomes one of the most important polymaths of that era. He also works on other projects, including the steam engine. During this time, he joins the Brotherhood of the Shield, a group of geniuses including Sir Isaac Newton, Imhotep, Zhang Heng, and Galileo Galilei.

After that, he is approached by a messenger from K'un-L'un to ask Leonardo for help in training Fongji Wu, the next Iron Fist, who becomes the host of the Phoenix Force. He along with Yu-Ti and Lei Kung are successful in manifesting the Phoenix Force within Fongji. They then construct a telescope to watch the arrival of the Phoenix and give Leonardo an opportunity to study it.

Leonardo eventually is able to time travel and leaves a robot to impersonate him in his mortal life. He travels to the 1960s, where he is confronted by the new leader of the Shield: Leonid, the son of Isaac Newton and the Deviant Morda. Leonid promises that he will rescue all things, but comes to a disagreement with Isaac who had become the undying leader of the group.

During this time, Leonardo forms the organization known as the Great Wheel of Zodiac, with its members including: Vasili Dassaiev, John Garrett, Shoji Soma, Cornelius van Lunt, Baron Strucker, Dum Dum Dugan, Nick Fury, Jake Fury, Daniel Whitehall, Viktor Uvarov, and Thomas Davidson, with each member being code-named after a sign of the zodiac. However, the organization falls apart, which leads to the creation of S.H.I.E.L.D., Hydra, Leviathan, and Zodiac. Leonardo states that the reason for forming the organization was to control its members.

== Brad Davis ==
Brad Davis was created by writer Marv Wolfman and artist Keith Pollard, and first appeared in The Amazing Spider-Man #188 (October 1978).

=== Brad Davis in other media ===
Brad Davis appears in Spider-Man: Far From Home, portrayed by Remy Hii.

== Dawnsilk ==
Dawnsilk is a fictional character appearing in American comic books published by Marvel Comics. The character was created by Fabian Nicieza and Art Thibert, and first appeared in Cable #1 (May 1993). She is a member of Clan Chosen in an alternative timeline where Cable was raised.

=== Dawnsilk in other media ===
Dawnsilk makes non-speaking appearances in X-Men: The Animated Series.

== Aliya Dayspring ==
Aliya Dayspring, also known as Jenskot and Aliya Summers, is a member of Clan Askani in an alternative timeline where Cable was raised. In addition, she is a co-founder of Clan Chosen, the first wife of Cable, and mother of Tyler Dayspring / Genesis.

=== Aliya Dayspring in other media ===
Aliya appears in Deadpool 2, portrayed by Hayley Sales.

== The Deacon ==
The Deacon is an enemy of Ghost Rider who was created by Jason Aaron. He is a zealot who believes he is doing the work of God. He has been blessed with powers and weapons from Heaven. His sole weakness is that he will not destroy any holy object such as the Bible. He believes he was chosen by Zadkiel, but eventually he is captured and put in prison.

When Johnny Blaze learns the truth of his origin, he goes to the prison the Deacon is in to talk to a priest being held there for murder. One of the prison guards lets Deacon out of his cell and gives him two large knives and the stone serum, which gives him super strength. He fights Blaze and is winning until they enter the chapel, where Blaze beats him with a Bible.

Escaping from prison he slaughters the order of nuns that raised Caretaker, known as Sara, and continues to act as an agent of Zadkiel. When the Ghost Riders go to heaven through the gate guarded by the Gun Nuns, the Deacon shows up and slaughters the nuns. Before he can kill the last one, Sara arrives. The two fight and Sara slashes his back, severing his spine and crippling him. He is later seen in a hospital bed with the Orb. At some point, Deacon dies and his soul is sent to Hell, becoming a demon.

== Deadbolt ==
Deadbolt is a mutant and a member of the Dark Riders assembled by Genesis. Deadbolt appeared to be a living skeleton who could extract his bones and use them as weapons. Deadbolt is decapitated by Wolverine after he rejects the adamantium and regresses to a feral state. Deadbolt's disembodied head is used to lure Gauntlet into Wolverine's grasp.

His skeletal structure is charged with bioenergy and his individual bones can be removed in pieces and used as razor sharp, high-density throwing weapons. He also had telepathy and could attack with psychic bolts.

== Betty Dean ==
Betty Dean Prentiss is a policewoman who was a supporting character of Namor and Namora in the Golden Age of comic books. First appearing in Marvel Mystery Comics #3 (January 1940), Dean is one of the earliest recurring characters and romantic interests in Marvel Comics. She often advocates compassion for air breathers to Namor and urges him to help the Allied Forces battle the Nazis. Dean was a key figure in Marvel's first crossover Marvel Mystery Comics #8–10 where she helps Namor and the Human Torch come to terms after battling each other. Midway through World War II, she becomes a reporter whose scoops often lead Namor to adventures. After WWII, she reunites with Namor for several adventures in the 1950s Atlas Comics. Dean becomes the guardian for Namor's young cousin, Namorita, during her surface world education. Dean is later transformed into a green scaled amphibian by Namor's foe, Dr. Hydro. She is killed by Lemuel Dorcas while saving Namor in Marvel Super-Villain Team-Up #2 (October 1975).

== Death ==
Death is the name of several characters in Marvel Comics. Some of them are members of the Horsemen of Apocalypse.

=== Horseman of Death ===
==== Sanjar Javeed ====
Death

Publication information
- Publisher: Marvel Comics
- First appearance: Uncanny X-Force vol. 1 #2 (January 2011)
- Created by: Rick Remender (writer); Jerome Opena (artist)

In-story information
- Full name: Sanjar Javeed
- Species: Human mutant
- Team affiliations: Horsemen of Apocalypse

Sanjar Javeed is the bastard son and servant of Shapur II, king of the Sasanian Empire. When Shapur refused to reveal his existence, Javeed turned to thievery to get the attention of his father. Using his mutant ability to channel disease, Javeed poisoned the entire kingdom by spreading disease through stolen treasures.

==== Death (First Horseman of Apocalypse) ====
Death

Publication information
- Publisher: Marvel Comics
- First appearance: Marvel Comics #1000 (August 2019)
- Created by: Jonathan Hickman (writer); Dustin Weaver (artist)

In-story information
- Full name: Death
- Species: Human mutant
- Team affiliations: Horsemen of Apocalypse; Swordbearers of Arakko
- Partnerships: Apocalypse (father); Genesis (mother)
- Abilities: Eyes of Death; Life sense

Death is the youngest of the four children of Apocalypse and Genesis, born and raised on Okkara. He and his siblings grow up to be the first Horsemen of Apocalypse and fight against the Brood in Ancient Egypt.

When the forces of the dimension of Amenth invaded Earth and split Okkara into Krakoa and Arakko, Death, along with his mother, his siblings, the Okkaran mutants, and Arakko, is voluntarily sealed away in Amenth to stop the invasion, while Apocalypse remains on Earth.

When Saturnyne arranges the X of Swords tournament, Death is chosen as a swordbearer for Arakko. As the tournament begins, Death pays Mad Jim Jaspers to poison Storm and Wolverine with Blightswill, a substance that nullifies their powers, to give Arakko's team an advantage. However, Storm defeats Death by reflecting his powers with her vibranium sword long enough to stun him, impaling him and winning the duel.

When Genesis, influenced by Annihilation, decides to seize control of Arakko, she leads her army into Sevalith to free Death. When Death encounters Storm on the battlefield, however, he refuses to fight her, having grown fond of her. When Pestilence attempts to kill Storm, Death, enraged, kills his sister in retaliation. Death defects to Storm's side of the war, resolving to bring peace to Arakko.

===== Powers and abilities of Death =====
Apocalypse's son is an Omega-level mutant with the ability to produce a disintegrating mist in a directed blast from his eyes that reduces living creatures to ash, known as the "Eyes of Death". While he is resistant to his own powers, he is not immune and can be stunned or hurt by them if the mist is reflected at him. He wears a helmet shaped like a jackal's head (evoking the ancient Egyptian god Anubis) that appears to regulate his powers.

Death can also detect the life force of others and is very long-lived, having been alive for thousands of years.

Though he normally uses a scythe in combat, Death wielded a sword known as the Black Bone of Amduat during the X of Swords tournament. It was destroyed in his duel with Storm.

==== Death in other media ====
===== Television =====
- An original incarnation of Death appears in X-Men: Evolution as Charles Xavier (voiced by David Kaye).
- Sanjar Javeed / Death makes a non-speaking appearance in the X-Men '97 episode "Days of Past Future".

===== Film =====
The unnamed female incarnation of Death appears in X-Men: Apocalypse, portrayed by Monique Ganderton. This version serves Apocalypse in ancient times.

== Death-Dealer ==
Death-Dealer (Li Ching-Lin) is a supervillain and an enemy of Shang-Chi appearing in Marvel Comics. Created by Doug Moench and Gene Day, he first appeared in Master of Kung Fu #115 (August 1982).

Li is an MI6 agent known for his extremely brutal methods who is also working as a double agent for the criminal mastermind Fu Manchu, who is Shang-Chi's father. When Shang-Chi and MI6 discover Li's true allegiance, Li flees from them and rendezvouses with Fu Manchu at his secret base in London, where he is given the name Death-Dealer, provided with a masked costume and weapons, and ordered to eliminate Shang-Chi and his allies. Death-Dealer succeeds in capturing Shang-Chi and brings him to Fu Manchu. Despite his weakened state, Shang-Chi escapes capture and defeats Death-Dealer in combat. With their London base destroyed, Death-Dealer and Fu Manchu escape by helicopter to Fu Manchu's fortress in China.

When Shang-Chi arrives at Fu Manchu's fortress, Death-Dealer is dispatched to take Shang-Chi's blood for Fu Manchu to preserve his longevity. Shang-Chi throws a brazier at him, which burns him to death.

=== Death-Dealer in other media ===
- Death-Dealer appears in Shang-Chi and the Legend of the Ten Rings, portrayed by Andy Le. This version is a member of the Ten Rings who serves under its leader Wenwu and personally trained Shang-Chi through cruel measures. While accompanying the Ten Rings to Ta Lo, the Dweller-in-Darkness' minions steal Death-Dealer's soul.
- An alternate universe version of Death-Dealer appears in Marvel Zombies.

== Death Metal ==
Death Metal

Publication information
- Publisher: Marvel UK
- First appearance: Death³ #1 (September 1993)
- Created by: Dan Abnett; Dell Barras

In-story information
- Alter ego: Death Metal
- Species: Robot
- Abilities: Shape-changing, superstrength, resistance to injury, ability to absorb memories and personalities of others

Death Metal is a robot appearing in Marvel Comics. The character appears in the Marvel UK imprint. He first appeared in Death³ #1 and was created by Dan Abnett and Dell Barras.

Death Metal was created by Doctor Evelyn Necker as part of the Minion project which also produced Death's Head II and Death Wreck. Necker sends Death Wreck through space and time, and he comes back with a magical semi-living metal that she calls "Promethium". Necker uses this metal to create a new cyborg, but she is unaware that the Promethium was created by the evil being called Charnel. Death Metal later steals a time machine and flees to the parallel universe of Charnel.

There he is found by the alternate versions of several mainstream Marvel Universe supervillains, whom he kills, and several alternate versions of several superheroes, whom he tries to kill. However, Death's Head and Death Wreck also arrive in Charnel's universe and end up fighting Death Metal along with the heroes. When that universe's Ghost Rider uses his mystical Penance Stare on Death Metal, it causes him to see his own sins and realize the extent of Charnel's evil. The three cyborgs then team up and defeat Charnel. Death Metal is then thrown through a temporal warp to modern-day Earth. After going on a disoriented violent rampage in Toronto, he encounters a being called Argon, a warrior of pure spirit who has been sent from another dimension to end the threat of Death Metal. He absorbs Argon's mind and spirit, only to find that his purity counteracts Death Metal's violent rage. Now seeing himself as a monster, he begins to seek his own death.

When the superhero team Alpha Flight arrives in response to his rampage, he attempts to escalate the fight so that he might be killed. This only restores his berserker rage, until Aurora uses her light powers to calm him. Realizing he is still a danger to others, he teleports away (see Death Metal #2 and Death Metal vs Genetix #1). In Death Metal vs. Genetix, Death Metal seeks to create a being that can destroy him. He takes cell samples from Alpha Flight's Madison Jeffries and Genetix's Vesper (both of whom can control technology) and creates an embryo which he surgically implants in empath Krista Marwan. Genetix rescues Krista, who inexplicably vows to have the child.

== Death Wreck ==
Death Wreck is a cyborg created by Craig Houston and Staz Johnson, first appearing in Death Wreck #1 (January 1994). Death Wreck is a prototype built by A.I.M. scientist Evelyn Necker in 2018 as part of the Minion project. Constructed at short notice and considered entirely expendable, Death Wreck contains the "brain of a wino" housed within a body powered by a car engine.

== Death-Shield ==
Death-Shield (Timothy Karlskin) is a character appearing in American comic books published by Marvel Comics. Created by David Michelinie and Jerry Bingham, he first appeared in The Amazing Spider-Man #367 (October 1992).

Death-Shield is one of three mercenaries trained by the Taskmaster, who was under contract by the Red Skull to create a team of mercenaries who would be capable of defeating Spider-Man. Death-Shield, Jagged Bow, and Blood Spider are respectively patterned after Captain America, Hawkeye, and Spider-Man. Solo helps Spider-Man defeat the three villains and thwart the machinations of the Red Skull, who was using the mercenaries to guard private files sought by Spider-Man in reference to his parents.

Death-Shield, Blood Spider, and Jagged Bow are among the criminals vying for the multimillion-dollar bounty placed on Agent Venom by Lord Ogre. The trio's attempt on Agent Venom's life is interrupted by competing mercenaries Constrictor and Lord Deathstrike.

== Deathdream ==
Deathdream (Hotoru Hashimoto) is a character appearing in American comic books published by Marvel Comics. Deathdream first appeared in Uncanny X-Men (vol. 6) #1 (August 2024) and was created by Gail Simone and David Marquez.

Hotoru is a mutant from Kyoto, Japan. On the day of his birth, he died multiple times and his power activated. He travelled to the United States where he joined with the Outliers, a group of young mutants pursued by Hag. The group would go on to join Gambit's Louisiana team of X-Men as their students.

Deathdream has the power of a "death state" in which he can swap between a state of life and death, through which he can summon and manipulate the power of spirits.

== Deathurge ==
Deathurge is a character who is a former servant of Maelstrom. A wraithlike entity of unknown origin, he is first seen killing the clones of Maelstrom or his minions to facilitate their escape and resurrection in another cloned body. Although appearing to be Maelstrom's minion, Deathurge actually follows his own motives. He is a former servant of an entity known as Oblivion. Deathurge was also the childhood companion and "guardian angel" of Craig Hollis, until he returns after a long absence to collect the soul of Craig's girlfriend Terri O'Doughan, who has committed suicide, thus turning Craig against him. In their final confrontation, Deathurge is captured by Craig and reveals that it will be Craig's destiny to outlive all of humanity, before he is replaced as messenger of death by Doorman.

== December ==
December (Winter Frost) is a mutant in X-Nation 2099. In the year 2099, Frost gets a job at a local amusement park. However, it is not a typical park, and has a king and queen who preside over it. One day Queen Perigrine disappears, and they find her body at the bottom of the Tunnel of Love. After that day, King Avian begins to be suspicious of everyone and requires genetic scans of all incoming tourists before they can enter. Anyone with genetic anomalies is imprisoned in an underground labyrinth and subjected to many tests and acts of torture. Frost is discovered to be a mutant and is imprisoned like the others. She is capable of drastically lowering the air temperature surrounding her hands and projecting it outwards to freeze the air around her into arctic gale winds, allowing her to flash freeze or freeze dry objects in her surroundings.

== Johnny Dee ==
Johnny Dee

Publication information
- Publisher: Marvel Comics
- First appearance: Son of M #1 (December 2005)

In-story information
- Alter ego: John D.
- Species: Human mutant
- Team affiliations: The 198
- Abilities: Has a living being on his chest that can produce "voodoo dolls"

Johnny Dee (John D.) is a mutant character who debuts in Son of M #1 (2005). Johnny has an octopus-like creature that protrudes from his chest with several tentacles. The creature has a brain of its own but cannot speak (although, it is suggested in The 198 that the latter could be false), and can produce a voodoo doll of a person after Johnny puts a sample of their DNA (like a strand of hair) in its mouth. The creature spits out a clamshell that contains a tiny naked replica of the person, giving him the ability to control the person entirely. Johnny and the creature share the same nervous system, but Johnny cannot feel the creature's pain. This is evidenced in Son of M #1 when one of the creature's tentacles is slashed, leaving them both on the verge of death, but Johnny is oblivious to the actual extent of the injury.

=== Fictional character biography ===
Johnny is one of the few mutants who keeps his powers after Scarlet Witch's alteration of the world to remove the powers of the world's mutants. Living in Mutant Town, Johnny is about to be killed by mutant-hating thugs. After being rescued by Spider-Man, Johnny agrees to move to the Xavier Institute.

When Magma arrives at the school, they share a conversation about her recent outburst. Magma sees him as a friend, but Johnny begins falling in love with her. Magma admits that Johnny looks cute but is a bit disgusted by his powers. Later, Johnny appears to use his powers to create small duplicates of Magma, and later of Jazz as well. They appear to be voodoo dolls that make the targets come under Johnny's control. Jazz spies on Johnny and finds him making a voodoo doll of Jazz. Johnny later uses the doll against Jazz and kills him.

Later, Demetrius Lazer has Johnny kill Mr. M. Johnny continues to be a pawn in General Lazer's agenda, until Lazer is found out by Valerie Cooper and General Reyes. Lazer and Johnny are incarcerated, but while Lazer is being tortured by Cooper for information to unlock a door trapping most of the 198, he realizes that Johnny touched him, at which point Johnny snaps the neck of a voodoo doll of Lazer, killing him. At this point, Johnny remains behind bars.

== D.E.E.D.E.E. ==
D.E.E.D.E.E. was created by writer Murewa Ayodele and artist Dotun Akande, and first appeared in I am Iron Man #4 (June 2023). D.E.E.D.E.E. is an artificial intelligence that runs Tony Stark's laboratory aboard the S.H.I.E.L.D. Helicarrier.

=== D.E.E.D.E.E. in other media ===
D.E.E.D.E.E. appears in VisionQuest, voiced by Jennifer Connelly.

== Defender ==
Defender (Don Stevens) is a superhero who appeared on the cover of the first issue of U.S.A. Comics and in stories from issues #2–4.

== Father Delgado ==
- Further reading: Father Delgado at the Comic Book DB (archived from the original); Father Delgado at the Grand Comics Database

Father Francis Xavier Delgado is a priest in Marvel Comics. The character, created by Bill Mantlo and Rick Leonardi, first appeared in Cloak and Dagger #1 (October 1983).

Father Delgado preaches at the Holy Ghost Church in the slums of Hell's Kitchen. He arrives at his church one day to find Cloak and Dagger, who came seeking sanctuary. After hearing their story, he chooses to honor their wishes of being discreet and takes them in, defending them from the police. Delgado is shown to detest Cloak and Dagger's vigilante efforts, but cannot stand to see them leave, particularly Dagger as he wants to "rescue" her from Cloak's "demonic" life.

While thankful for being rescued, Delgado still fears that Cloak and Dagger's souls are corrupted by demons. When Dagger returns to the church, Delgado confronts Cloak and forces him to leave with holy water. His action inadvertently awakens the Predator, the demon responsible for Cloak's hunger, and resurrects the spirit of Jack the Ripper. When Dagger learns that Delgado turned Cloak away, she angrily leaves him. Delgado is later taken away to a psychiatric hospital by the congregation. Dagger later visits Delgado and learns that he appears to be sane; however, Delgado falls under the control of Mister Jip, who is keeping him alive and who he sees as his God.

=== Father Delgado in other media ===
Father Delgado appears in Cloak & Dagger, portrayed by Jaime Zevallos. This version is a school counselor and priest at St. Sebastian's School, who assists Tyrone and tries to dissuade him from negative thoughts.

== Demiurge ==
Demiurge is a cosmic entity who created the Elder Gods. In the 2025 series Wiccan: Witches' Road, it is clarified that the Demiurge is the progenitor of Earth and the source of all magical power on Earth. Over time, the Demiurge began seeking a vessel for its power, ultimately choosing Wiccan. In the present, Wiccan learns that he has lost his connection to the Demiurge due to leaving Earth to work with his husband Hulkling in the Kree-Skrull alliance. At the insistence of Baba Yaga, Wiccan travels down the Witches' Road to regain his powers.

== Demon Bear ==
The Demon Bear is a character appearing in The New Mutants and X-Force connected to Danielle Moonstar and the formation of the New Mutants. Its powers include teleportation, shapeshifting, negative emotion empowerment, and corruption of human souls.

As a child, Danielle Moonstar unintentionally used her psychic powers to foresee the deaths of her parents, William and Peg Moonstar, in a vision that showed them being killed by a bear. When her parents disappeared on a hunting trip a week later, Dani believed her vision had come true. It was later revealed, however, that Dani's vision had been metaphorical; in truth, her parents had been captured and transformed into a demonic bear spirit by the Adversary.

Increasingly troubled by her dreams of the Demon Bear, Danielle Moonstar runs various Danger Room scenarios against bears and then confronts the demon alone; it mauls her and severely damages her spine. The New Mutants rush her to the Mid-County Medical Center. However, Demon Bear infiltrates the hospital, transports the team to the Badlands, and turns Sharon Friedlander and Tom Corsi into demonic Native American warriors under his control. Friedlander and Corsi are later freed of the Demon Bear's influence, but retain the appearance of Native Americans. The New Mutants later battle and defeat the Demon Bear, disrupting it with Magik's Soulsword. Danielle's parents leap from its body, returning them to normal.

The Demon Bear later appears in possession of Bishop, before being driven out by Psylocke. Once Bishop is freed, Psylocke takes on the now docile bear as a companion.

=== Demon Bear in other media ===
Demon Bear appears in The New Mutants. This version was manifested by Danielle Moonstar after her mutant powers first activated and subsequently destroyed the reservation that she lived on while also killing her dad. In the present, Moonstar unknowingly summons the Demon Bear again after Cecilia Reyes attempts to kill her. Subsequently, she battles the Demon Bear in her mind and dissipates it after confronting her past.

== Desert Ghost ==
Desert Ghost (Xi'an Chi Xan) is a mutant created for the Marvel 2099 imprint. The character was created by John Francis Moore and Ron Lim, and first appeared in X-Men 2099 #1 (October 1993). He is the founder of the 2099 X-Men and has been both the leader and an enemy of the team.

Xi'an was born into a well-respected family. However, when his mutant power to break down the molecular structure of whatever he touches with his left hand manifested, his parents turned him over to a genetics lab to save their own reputation. Before reaching the lab, Xi'an destroyed his restraints and escaped. He spent much of the rest of his youth on the streets, in and out of gangs before joining the Lawless, gaining the nickname Desert Ghost. After being chased by bounty hunters in Saigon, Xi'an left the Lawless and returned to the US, with a more refined demeanor and a new purpose, to create his own version of the X-Men to help fight for genetic equality.

The team almost immediately runs into trouble when Xi'an is accused of murdering casino mogul Noah Synge. The team hurries to clear his name, but in the course of things Xi'an is shot. Instead of dying, his body encases itself in a cocoon. He soon emerges from this cocoon fully healed. This trauma also triggers a secondary mutation, giving Xi'an the power to heal with his right hand.

Xi'an travels with the X-Men to the mutant City-State of Halo City, where he leaves the team to open a clinic and heal people with his powers. He briefly rejoins his remaining Lawless brethren; Auntie Maim, Mongrel and Victor Ten Eagles, to escape Foolkiller, a human hunting down members of the Lawless for their part in the massacre of his hometown.

With the rest of humanity, Xi'an retreats to the Savage Land as the polar ice caps begin to melt and flood the world. He helps to rebuild civilization, often getting in heated arguments with the surviving humans. His long-time friend Victor Ten Eagles attempts to help him while Morphine Somers attempts to disrupt the fragile peace within the Last Refuge, believing mutants should rule by right of genetic superiority.

== Bob Diamond ==
Bob Diamond is a member of the Sons of the Tiger in the Marvel Universe. The character, created by Steve Englehart and Jim Starlin, first appeared in The Deadly Hands of Kung Fu #1 (April 1974).

Bob Diamond is a skilled martial artist and allies with Abe Brown, Lin Sun, Luke Cage, and Iron Fist.

== Diamond Lil ==
Diamond Lil (Lillian Crawley) is a character appearing in Marvel Comics. She first appeared in Alpha Flight #1 (May 1983), created by John Byrne. Diamond Lil is a mutant with the power of superhuman durability and strength generated by a "bio-aura" of energy around her. Her abilities limit her sense of touch, and in one instance made it difficult to remove a benign tumor in her body.

Diamond Lil was recruited for Gamma Flight initially, before being mind controlled into joining the villainous Omega Flight by Delphine Courtney. She was pardoned for her actions and would join Alpha Flight. She began a romantic relationship with Madison Jeffries while he was engaged to Heather Hudson, and would later marry and retire alongside him. When Jeffries opted to join Alpha Flight, Lillian left him. She later sought him out in the Department H facilities, only to be captured and experimented on by Department K. She was later rescued by Alpha Flight.

Lillian was next seen as a prisoner in the mutant concentration camp, Neverland. She survived the ordeal, and retained her powers after M-Day. She joined the remaining mutants at the Xavier Institute and later Utopia. She reconciled with Madison but was killed by Mortis during the events of Necrosha.

== Diamondback ==
Diamondback is the name of two characters in Marvel Comics.

== Dirtnap ==
Dirtnap is a mutant with the ability to possess others, absorbing their bodies and abilities. He is a member of the Dark Riders. Following a confrontation with Wolverine, Dirtnap inadvertently absorbed a rat, causing him to be trapped in the form of a rat while retaining his capability of speech. Later on, Dirtnap encounters the group Generation X, who he befriends after they save his life. When M-Plate attempts to merge the minds of everyone in the universe into a single consciousness, Dirtnap stops M-Plate by consuming them, which causes M-Plate to separate into M and Emplate. However, the effort inflates his body and causes him to explode.

Dirtnap resurfaces in the series Marauders as a member of the Theater of Pain until he is killed by Daken.

== Discus ==
Discus (Tim Stuart) first appeared in Power Man #16 in December 1974, and was created by Jenny Blake Isabella and Billy Graham.

The youngest son of Tyler Stuart, a warden at Seagate Prison, Tim Stuart is employed by Justin Hammer and given a costume, jet-pack, and assorted weaponry. He takes the name Discus, as his weapon of choice is a throwing disc; he usually carries disc-shaped flying blades. He is the younger brother of Stiletto.

== DJ ==
DJ (Mark Sheppard) is a student at the Xavier Institute for Higher Learning who first appears in New X-Men: Academy X #2 (2004). DJ possesses the ability to manipulate energy, gaining different powers based on the type of music he is listening to.

DJ is a member of the Corsairs training squad who transfers to the Paragons squad. He is one of the many students depowered on M-Day, and later dies after the school is attacked by the Purifiers. DJ was resurrected following the establishment of Krakoa and its resurrection protocols. Following the fall of Krakoa, he starts a band called She Attax with fellow mutant Shark-Girl.

== Doctor Danger ==
Doctor Danger is a character created by Stan Lee and Jack Keller who appears in American comic books published by Marvel Comics, particularly its Old West-themed comic titles, usually as an enemy of Kid Colt.

Jules Bergen is a criminal ventriliquist who wanders the late 19th century Old West in the supposed company of his partner, The Invisible Gunman, who consists of a hat and revolver which Bergen secretly controls using magnets and whose voice is performed by Bergen. When confronted, Bergen would trick his adversary into focusing on the more obvious threat (the Invisible Gunman), then shoot them with a gun hidden beneath his cloak. While terrorizing the town of River Bend, Bergen is confronted by Kid Colt, who after an initial defeat sees through the ruse and delivers Bergen to the authorities.

In state prison, Bergen teams up with his fellow prisoners Sam "Scorpion" Scorpio and Bull Barton and breaks out after fighting Kid Colt, who was wrongly imprisoned at that time. Kid Colt also escapes and apprehends the trio, as well as the bounty hunter responsible for his imprisonment. Bergen, now using a powerful horseshoe magnet as his main weapon, later accepts Iron Mask's offer to join him, Fat Man and Bennington Brown as a member of their Circus of Crime, but the gang is stopped by Kid Colt.

Bergen rejoins Iron Mask and Fatman as a member of Iron Mask's newly formed gang of Old West supervillains. However, they are confronted and defeated by Rawhide Kid, Two-Gun Kid, Phantom Rider and the time-stranded West Coast Avengers and delivered to the authorities.

== Doctor Decibel ==
Doctor Decibel (Anton Decibel) is a criminal surgeon working for the Institute of Evil, and he performed the operation on Lady Lark that endowed her with hypersonic vocal cords. Like the rest of the Institute members, he was defeated by the Squadron Supreme and behavior modified and elected to full membership in the Squadron. Doctor Decibel was killed when he suffocated in Quagmire's extradimensional slime.

Doctor Decibel carried a device capable of transmitting 300 decibels of sonic energy.

== Doctor Demonicus ==
Doctor Demonicus (Douglas Birely) is a supervillain appearing in Marvel Comics. He possesses advanced knowledge of genetic engineering and clashes with the Avengers and the Shogun Warriors, in addition to S.H.I.E.L.D. Doctor Demonicus first appeared in Godzilla, King of the Monsters #4 (Nov 1977) and was created by Doug Moench and Tom Sutton.

Douglas Birely was born in Culver City, California. As a scientist, he was studying the correlation between radioactivity and mutation when he was contaminated by a radioactive spill. As Doctor Demonicus, he is a criminal geneticist. His discovery of the Lifestone radioactive meteorite allows him to create kaiju-like monsters mutated from animals. Using his monsters and his Demon-Soldiers, he raids oil tankers from his secret laboratory on the Aleutian Islands. The monsters are defeated by Godzilla and Demonicus is defeated by Gabe Jones and taken into S.H.I.E.L.D. custody.

Demonicus is the founder, creator, and leader of the Pacific Overlords, who gain superpowers due to Demonicus exposing them to fragments of the Lifestone. He raises a land mass from the Pacific Ocean floor just north of Hawaii, and founds on it the new nation of Demonica with himself as ruler. He attempts, unsuccessfully, to get the United Nations to recognize Demonica as a sovereign nation.

Doctor Demonicus is a genius with a PhD in genetics and has an advanced knowledge of genetics and Myndai technology. He wears a costume that contains life-support devices that keep his skin cancer in remission. He has demonic-looking features, including mottled skin and horns. He carries a blaster that fires an unknown form of concussive energy. He uses advanced genetics, robotics, and force field technology adapted to various weaponry. Demonicus possesses the Lifestone, a radioactive meteor, with which he has created artificially mutated monsters and humans.

== Doctor Glitternight ==
Doctor Glitternight is an extra-dimensional being with strange powers over the substance of the human soul. Glitternight was able to exploit the Werewolf's lover, Topaz, by stealing a portion of her soul. She is eventually restored to sanity, and after discovering what Glitternight had done to her, Topaz defeats Glitternight, regaining her soul in the process.

== Doctor Midas ==
Doctor Midas is a pirate who exposed himself to cosmic radiation, gaining the ability to turn anything to gold. He founds the Midas Foundation and has an adoptive daughter named Oublliette Midas who took on the name Exterminatrix.

Midas later exposes himself to further cosmic radiation and gains the powers of the Fantastic Four as well as cosmic awareness, mind control, regeneration, and telepathy. He briefly adopts the codename Cosmic Man. Noh-Varr defeats Cosmic Man and sends him into the Dark Dimension.

In the storyline "Original Sin", Midas escapes from the Dark Dimension and reunites with Exterminatrix. They accompany Orb in going to the Blue Area of the Moon to steal one of Uatu's eyes. When confronted by Nick Fury, Doctor Midas is forced to absorb all of the eye's abilities and dies after being overloaded.

== Doctor Sun ==
Doctor Sun is a character appearing in Marvel Comics. The character first appeared in Tomb of Dracula #16 (January 1974), created by Marv Wolfman and Gene Colan. The character dies in Fantastic Four #217 (April 1980).

== Doctor Tramma ==
Doctor Tramma (sometimes called Doc Tramma) is an unnamed genius who was born in North Korea. After leaving North Korea, she set up a shop where she augments others with cybernetic technology. At one point, Tramma was hired by Mister Negative and gave Hammerhead an adamantium skeleton.

Working for an unidentified employer, Tramma performs human experimentation. After a series of experiments, Tramma causes Hijack to short out the lights in half of Manhattan as she speaks to her employer, who is revealed to be Tombstone. Spider-Girl later finds Hijack with Tramma and manages to defeat Tramma and her minions.

== Dog Brother ==
Dog Brother (Sihing) is a character appearing in American comic books published by Marvel Comics. He is also called Dog Brother #1. Created by Ed Brubaker, Matt Fraction, and David Aja, he first appeared in The Immortal Iron Fist #8 (August 2007).

Sihing is a Chinese boy who was orphaned during the First Opium War. He grew up on the streets alongside Sidai and was motivated by the legend of Dog Brother #1, a man accompanied by a pack of dogs who saved children from being forced to work in mining. Sihing and Sidai were later captured by the Hongmen gang and forced into labor. After Sidai was killed, Sihing was saved by Dog Brother #1, who chose him as his successor. Sihing was forced to kill Dog Brother #1 to take his mantle, taking command of his dog pack.

== Stacy Dolan ==
Stacy Dolan is the occasional girlfriend of Danny Ketch. First appearing in Ghost Rider (vol. 3) #1 by Howard Mackie and Javier Saltares, she is the daughter of NYPD captain Arthur Dolan. Stacy grew up the childhood friends of Danny and Barbara Ketch and Jack D'Auria. As they grew older Stacy and Danny developed a romantic relationship. Stacy has aspirations to become a police officer like her father. Her life changes when she finds out that Danny is in the hospital and his sister is in a coma. All she knows is they witnessed a murder and the sole suspect is the Ghost Rider. After that night Stacy notices a pattern as familiar neighborhood faces are murdered. Ghost Rider is involved in some way but she does not realize to what extent.

Over time, Stacy teams up with Ghost Rider and the Midnight Sons. During the event known as the Siege of Darkness, she acts as an unofficial representative of the NYPD, and works in conjunction with the Midnight Sons to help stop the growing threats of Lilith and Zarathos. During the battle she discovers Danny is the Ghost Rider.

== Dominus ==
Dominus is a sentient super-computer, created by the alien Quists and sometimes controlled by Lucifer. Dominus is the channel by which the alien race known as "The Arcane" conquers planet after planet. At Lucifer's command post, the Supreme One tells Lucifer that the time is ready for his true purpose – to deploy Dominus. Dominus and Lucifer are then temporarily defeated by Charles Xavier, who suffers a debilitating injury in the process. The X-Men go on to defeat Lucifer permanently.

== Don of the Dead ==
Don of the Dead was originally a US citizen and ex-S.H.I.E.L.D. intelligence operative who had fled to Mexico. He, along with Taskmaster, re-trained former Mexican Special Forces members to take over the operations of a drug cartel. The group became known as Los Narcocorridoes, and the former S.H.I.E.L.D. agent (donning a skull mask and feigning a Mexican accent) became their leader, known as the Don of the Dead.

== Dorrek VII ==
Dorrek VII is a character appearing in American comic books published by Marvel Comics. He was created by Stan Lee and Jack Kirby, and first appeared in Fantastic Four #18 (June 1963). He was the Skrull Emperor as well as the husband of R'Klll, father of Anelle and grandfather of Hulkling (also known as Dorrek VIII).

=== Dorrek VII in other media ===
- Dorekk VII appears in The Fantastic Four, voiced by Don Messick.
- Dorekk VII appears in Fantastic Four (1994), voiced by Robert Ridgely in the first season and by Beau Weaver in the second season.

== Doug and Jerry ==
Doug and Jerry is a fictional character, a two-headed mutant in the Marvel Comics universe. His first appearance was in Generation M #2.

Jerry is the main body, a fat man with a beard and dark long hair. Doug is primarily made up by the head Jerry has, pointing out from his back.

== Dragon Man ==
Dragon Man is a dragon-like android built by Professor Gregson Gilbert and brought to life by Diablo. However, Dragon Man broke his control and attempted to kill Diablo. Although Dragon Man is slow-minded to the point that he is incapable of speech, he understands orders given by Diablo and is a determined foe of the Fantastic Four.

Dragon Man is imprisoned in the Negative Zone; like most of the other prisoners, is conscripted into service when Blastaar attacks the prison. When the Shadow Initiative is sent to liberate the prison, Blastaar sends Dragon Man against them. However, Komodo uses Dragon Man's attraction to her to convince him to switch sides. Following this, Dragon Man reforms and goes on to join the Future Foundation.

=== Dragon Man in other media ===
- Dragon Man appears in The New Fantastic Four.
- Dragon Man appears in the Fantastic Four: World's Greatest Heroes episode "Frightful". This version was created by Wizard and is a member of the Frightful Four.
- Dragon Man appears in Ultimate Spider-Man. This version was created by Doctor Octopus.
- Dragon Man appears in Spider-Man: Web of Fire.
- Dragon Man appears in Fantastic Four (1997).
- Dragon Man appears as a boss in Fantastic Four (2005).
- Dragon Man appears as a mini-boss in Marvel: Ultimate Alliance. This version is a former member of Doctor Doom's Masters of Evil.
- Dragon Man appears in Marvel Heroes.
- Dragon Man appears in Marvel Contest of Champions.
- Dragon Man received several action figures released by Toy Biz. The character was included in Fantastic Four series 2 (1995), Fantastic Four Metal Mania (1995), Marvel Universe (1997), and Fantastic Four Classics series 2 (2007).
- Dragon Man received an action figure from HeroClix (2021).

== Dragon of the Moon ==
The Dragon of the Moon is a character appearing in American comic books published by Marvel Comics. It first appeared in The Defenders #138–139 (December 1984 – January 1985), and was created by Peter B. Gillis and Don Perlin. The Dragon of the Moon is a malevolent entity that has been a foe of both the Defenders and the Eternals.

The Dragon's exact origins are unrevealed, however it does claim to know some of the Elders of the Universe. It has claimed to kill the inhabitants of Titan before the Eternals inhabited it. It has also claimed that the Lords of Light once took away his freedom. It has visited the Earth several times. The first time, it tried to take over the Earth, but was apparently repulsed by the Eternal Interloper. The Dragon of the Moon possesses control over massive amounts of cosmic and mystical forces, presumably on at least a global scale. It is immortal. Its strength is increased on the mortal plane as the host of the Dragon of the Moon succumbs to the Dragon's influence.

== Dragonfly ==
Dragonfly is a character appearing in American comic books published by Marvel Comics. The character first appeared in X-Men #94–95 (August–October 1975), and was created by Chris Claremont and Len Wein.

Veronica Dultry is endowed with superhuman powers by Maggia scientists to serve the crime lord Count Nefaria as a member of the original Ani-Men. The Ani-Men take control of the NORAD base at Mount Valhalla, but are defeated by the X-Men, and imprisoned in the mutant research complex at Muir Island. She escapes shortly after when Erik the Red breaks into the complex.

She is later abducted by the alien the Stranger to his laboratory world, where she and other abductees are manipulated by the Overmind into battling Quasar. After she returns to Earth, she mutates further due to the Stranger's experiments, but Ant-Man aids her in returning to her normal appearance.

Much later, Dragonfly is invited to join the Crimson Cowl's Masters of Evil, where she battles the Thunderbolts. They are defeated and sent to prison.

During the "Secret Empire" storyline, Dragonfly is recruited by Baron Helmut Zemo to join the Army of Evil.

=== Dragonfly in other media ===
Dragonfly appears in The Avengers: United They Stand episode "Command Decision", voiced by Susan Roman. This version is a member of Baron Helmut Zemo's Masters of Evil.

== Dragoness ==
Dragoness is a mutant supervillain that debuted in New Mutants (Vol. 1) #93 (July, 1990) by Louise Simonson and Rob Liefeld. A member of the Mutant Liberation Front, Dragoness has the ability to generate and store bioelectric energy that she can expel from her hands, disrupting neural activity or creating high temperatures. She wears a mechanical suit with wings that allow her to fly.

Tamara Kurtz's parents were exposed to radiation in Hiroshima, resulting in Tamara's genetic mutation. She later became affiliated with the Mutant Liberation Front (MLF) after Stryfe discovered her living in Madripoor. Dragoness rejoined the MLF under Reignfire but was captured by Prime Sentinels from Operation: Zero Tolerance on a mission. Dragoness retained her powers after M-Day, as listed in the X-Men: The 198 Files. The government considers her a 'General' national security threat.

== Carlton Drake ==
- Further reading: Carlton Drake at the Comic Book DB (archived from the original); Carlton Drake at the Grand Comics Database

Carlton Drake is a character appearing in Marvel Comics. The character, created by David Michelinie and Todd McFarlane, first appeared in The Amazing Spider-Man #298 (March 1988). He is the Life Foundation's leader who is constantly at odds with Spider-Man and Eddie Brock.

Drake works with the foreign assassin Chakane in a plot to use Protectors, enhanced and mindless mercenaries, for the assassination of Symkaria's king. The Protectors are defeated by Spider-Man, Paladin and Silver Sable but Drake's resources prevent any prosecution. Afterwards, Drake used the Tri-Sentinel for his clientele's protection. While performing a "field test" against Spider-Man and Nova, the Tri-Sentinel is unresponsive to his controls and embarks on a rampage. With nothing else to lose, Drake has his men gather all the data and once again evade capture.

Drake uses seeds extracted from the Venom symbiote to create five new symbiote "children" (Scream, Phage, Agony, Lasher, and Riot) which he bonds to his employees. However, his symbiote enforcers are defeated by Spider-Man and Brock, forcing Drake to once again flee while realizing that Spider-Man is more troublesome than he believed.

=== Carlton Drake in other media ===
Carlton Drake appears in Venom (2018), portrayed by Riz Ahmed. This version is the Life Foundation's vainglorious, egocentric founder and CEO who started out as a biochemist. After one of his company's spaceships discovers several symbiotes, Drake has the symbiotes brought to him to run experiments on. However, two of the symbiotes die due to failed bonding attempts, the Venom symbiote escapes and successfully bonds with Eddie Brock, while Drake bonds with the Riot symbiote. Together, they attempt to bring more symbiotes to Earth, only to be killed by Brock and Venom.

== Frank Drake ==
Frank Drake is a direct descendant of Count Dracula (via a marriage from before he became a vampire). The character first appeared in Tomb of Dracula #1 and was created by Gene Colan and Gerry Conway.

Frank Drake is a former millionaire who had squandered his inheritance and had nothing more than an ancestral castle in Transylvania. Planning to sell it, he and his friends travel to the castle, and discover Dracula's skeleton. They accidentally resurrect him, and Drake narrowly escapes death. Drake eventually relocates to London.

Broke and in despair, Drake attempts to commit suicide but was saved by vampire hunters Rachel van Helsing and Taj Nital. The two, along with Quincy Harker, were dedicated to killing Dracula and his vampiric followers. Drake joins the group under van Helsing and Harker's tutelage. He is later killed in battle, and has largely remained dead since.

Frank Drake is a capable hand-to-hand combatant, and an experienced marksman. He has been known to carry conventional handguns. He also possesses a nano-tech weapon capable of disrupting occult energies, which he calls Linda.

=== Frank Drake in other media ===
Frank Drake appears in Dracula: Sovereign of the Damned, voiced by Keiichi Noda in the original Japanese version and by Dan Woren in the English dub.

== Madeline and William Drake ==
Madeline Drake (née Bass) and William Drake are the parents of Bobby Drake, the mutant hero known as Iceman. The pair debuted in X-Men #44 (March, 1968), by Gary Friedrich, George Tuska, and John Verpoorten. The pair were unsupportive of Bobby's superhero career, as well as his later gay lifestyle. William died of a prior heart condition during the Krakoan Age.

=== Madeline and William Drake in other media ===
- Madeline and William Drake appear in X2, portrayed by Jill Teed and Alf Humphreys respectively. The pair have another son named Ronny.
- Madeline and William Drake appear in Wolverine and the X-Men, voiced by Gwendoline Yeo and Stephen Stanton, respectively.

== Odessa Drake ==
Odessa Drake is a supervillain and thief who first appeared in The Amazing Spider-Man (vol. 5) #8. She was created by Nick Spencer and Humberto Ramos.

Odessa Drake was raised in New York City by her father, Castillo, as a member of a secret society of criminals known as the Thieves' Guild. After her father's death, Odessa continued his search for immortality, which she obtained via a deal with the Gilded Saint. She became leader of the Thieves' Guild, which she sought to return to glory by killing anyone on debt with the Guild and stealing gear from superheroes. Fellow Guild member Black Cat was worried over the consequences stealing from superheroes would have on the world, so she contacted Spider-Man and the two tried to give back the stolen items. Odessa and the Guild attempted to stop them by fording them into the magic-powered vault where they kept the stolen items, but had to retreat when Spider-Man used Ms. Marvel's phone to contact reinforcements. Odessa was nevertheless pleased that the Guild has risen in infamy through their actions.

In the aftermath of the King in Black storyline, Black Cat revealed to Drake that her father Black Fox has stolen the Thieves' Guild's immortality by surrendering New York's deed to the Saint. Under the agreement of getting rid of the Black Fox, Odessa agreed to help Black Cat, and the two traveled to the Saint's world, where they convinced the Saint that Black Fox was going to scam him, so he brought Fox to his world as punishment. Later, the two discussed the possibility of a relationship in spite of their positions in the Guild, before having sex.

=== Odessa Drake in other media ===
Odessa Drake appears in Moon Girl and Devil Dinosaur, voiced by Anna Akana. This version is a social media influencer who wields gadgets and weaponry stolen from superheroes, such as the Avengers, before eventually reforming after attending Moon Girl's Good Word Program.

== Dreadface ==
Dreadface is a character appearing in American comic books published by Marvel Comics. The character, created by Tom DeFalco and Paul Ryan, first appeared in Fantastic Four #359 (December 1991).

He is a Symbiote and a foe of the Fantastic Four.

== Dreamqueen ==
The Dreamqueen is a character appearing in American comic books published by Marvel Comics. The character first appeared in Alpha Flight #57 (April 1988). The character was created by Bill Mantlo and Jim Lee.

Dreamqueen is the daughter of a succubus named Zhilla Char and Nightmare, ruler of the Dream Dimension. Her birth killed her mother, and gave the Dreamqueen all her memories. She was born in a similar "dream dimension" of her own called Liveworld, of which she is the ruler. It was to this dimension that the fetus of Laura Dean instinctively sent her unborn twin sister, Goblyn. As the autistic Laura grew up, she discovered that she was able to switch places in Liveworld with her sister. After encountering Alpha Flight, Goblyn and Laura were admitted into Beta Flight under the misbelief that they were one and the same person. The Dreamqueen possesses a gifted intelligence, is entirely self-educated in the study of sorcery, and gains her powers through the manipulation of the forces of magic.

== Igor Drenkov ==
Igor Drenkov, also known as Igor Skylar, is a character appearing in American comic books published by Marvel Comics. He was created by Stan Lee and Jack Kirby, and first appeared in The Incredible Hulk #1 (May 1962).

Drenkov is a Russian spy working for Gargoyle who posed as a colleague of Bruce Banner, Thunderbolt Ross and Betty Ross while undercover. Drenkov detonated the gamma bomb as Banner rescues Rick Jones, resulting in his colleague's transformation into the Hulk.

Drenkov is later driven insane by nightmares of his decisions and works with the Presence. However, he is betrayed and transformed into a gamma monster who fights the Winter Guard before being killed by Darkstar.

=== Igor Drenkov in other media ===
- Igor Drenkov appears in The Marvel Super Heroes.
- Igor Drenkov appears in the Avengers Assemble episode "Dehulked", voiced by André Sogliuzzo. This version is a technology thief who is served by the Detroit Steelcorps.

== Gerry Drew ==
Gerald "Gerry" Drew is a character appearing in American comic books published by Marvel Comics. He is the son of Spider-Woman (Jessica Drew).

=== MC2 (Earth-982) ===
Gerry Drew was introduced in the imprint Marvel Comics 2, which takes places in an alternate timeline. Due to being exposed to radiation before his birth, Gerry develops a blood disorder. Jessica Drew attempts to treat his condition with further radiation exposure, leading him to develop superpowers akin to hers. Believing that he is going to die, Gerry briefly becomes known as Spider-Man, but is convinced to retire after a villain is killed taking a bullet that was intended for him.

=== Earth-616 ===
The Earth-616 incarnation of Gerry Drew developed superpowers without external stimuli. During the period that Jessica Drew is severed from the Web of Life and Destiny and ceases to exist, Gerry is kidnapped by Hydra and rapidly aged into an adult to serve their needs. Gerry goes on to join Hydra under the codename Green Mamba.

== Rachel Dreyfuss ==
Rachel Dreyfuss is a character appearing in American comic books published by Marvel Comics. Created by Fabian Nicieza and Mark Bagley, she first appeared in New Warriors #21 (January 1992).

Rachel Dreyfus was the prosecutor for the trial of Vance Astrovik for the first-degree murder and negligent homicide of Arnold Astrovik.

== Dryad ==
Dryad

Publication information
- Publisher: Marvel Comics
- First appearance: New X-Men: Academy X #1 (July 2004)
- Created by: Nunzio DeFilippis, Christina Weir

In-story information
- Alter ego: Callie Betto
- Species: Human mutant
- Team affiliations: Corsairs training squad Xavier Institute
- Abilities: Plant manipulation

Dryad (Callie Betto) is a character appearing in American comic books published by Marvel Comics. Created by Nunzio DeFilippis and Christina Weir, she first appeared in New X-Men: Academy X #1.

Dryad is a member of the former Corsairs training squad, consisting of Specter, Quill, and the Stepford Cuckoos, who possesses the mutant ability to manipulate plant life. During "Decimation", Dryad is among the mutants who lose their powers to the Scarlet Witch and is later killed by William Stryker.

Long after her death, Dryad is resurrected following the establishment of Krakoa and its resurrection protocols.

== Michael Duffy ==
- Further reading: Michael Duffy at the Comic Book DB (archived from the original); Michael Duffy at the Grand Comics Database

Sgt. Michael "Mike" Duffy is a character appearing in American comic books published by Marvel Comics. The character, created by Joe Simon and Jack Kirby, first appeared in Captain America Comics #1 (March 1941).

Michael Duffy was the superior of Steve Rogers and James Barnes who were secretly Captain America and Bucky. He had a short temper and was always getting after his soldiers for "goldbricking". He was always picking on Rogers and Barnes for not being heroes, an ironic claim as he was unaware of their dual identities. He had nearly put two and two together, but would later deny the possibility. At one point, Duffy showed remorse when he thought that Rogers and Barnes had died in a Japanese air raid, only to go back to berating them when he found out they were alive. He also had a crush on Betsy Ross though this was retconned to show that he had a lover overseas named Flo. While out on a mission, Duffy and several soldiers were caught in an explosion. He survived and was recuperating in a hospital. Due to his lack of appearances afterwards, it's implied that he stayed in bed for the remainder of the war. Years later, Rogers would visit Arlington National Cemetery to see his former commander's grave stone and reminisce on old times.

=== Michael Duffy in other media ===
Michael Duffy appears in the Marvel Cinematic Universe films Captain America: The First Avenger and Captain America: The Winter Soldier, portrayed by Damon Driver. This version is a drill sergeant who is not comically temperamental nor mean-spirited towards Steve Rogers.

== Dum-Dum ==
Dum-Dum is an alias utilized by characters appearing in American comic books published by Marvel Comics.

=== Dum-Dum Duggan ===
An Ultimate Marvel equivalent is Dan "Dum-Dum" Duggan, a member of Nick Fury's Howling Commandos.

== Fred Duncan ==
- Further reading: Fred Duncan at the Comic Book DB (archived from the original); Fred Duncan at the Grand Comics Database

Frederick Amos "Fred" Duncan is a government liaison for the X-Men in Marvel Comics. The character, created by Stan Lee and Jack Kirby, first appeared in X-Men #2 (November 1963).

Fred Duncan was an agent with the FBI. Along with fellow agent Bolivar Trask, Duncan was asked by his superiors on how to handle the "mutant threat". While Trask felt that America should fear them, Duncan thought it was best to work alongside them. Duncan's idea was approved, causing tension between him and Trask to the point that the latter suspected him to be a mutant as well. He then teamed up with Wolverine to battle Lyle Doome who went by the name Virus.

He met with Professor Charles Xavier and became the FBI's federal liaison with the X-Men. He was then provided a special headband so that he can communicate with Xavier whenever it was necessary. He helped Xavier with the eventual recruitment of Scott Summers. As a member of the Xavier Underground, a network of mutant supporters, Duncan maintained mutant criminal records and stockpiled weapons and technology from X-Men foes.

Duncan later helped the X-Men once again when the team had to break into the Pentagon to delete the files they had about their identities. Henry Peter Gyrich suspected that Duncan had something to do with the files being deleted and demanded that he somehow get them back (the Department of Mutant Affairs answered to Gyrich's Project Wideawake), but Duncan instead resigned. Duncan then decided to write a tell-all book about his time working with the mutants. After Duncan's death, Carl Denti, an aspiring agent, takes the files, weapons, and technology for himself and assumes the name X-Cutioner, with the proclaimed mission of killing any mutant that has killed other people first.

== Dyna-Mite ==
Dyna-Mite (Roger Aubrey), subsequently known as Destroyer, was a member of the Crusaders. The character first appeared as Dyna-Mite in The Invaders #14–15 (March–April 1977). He also appears as Dyna-Mite in The Invaders #18–23 (July–December 1977).

Aubrey, a close friend of the hero Brian Falsworth, also known as Union Jack, supported peace between Germany and Britain. Around 1938, the pair went on a German tour. War began and the two quickly discovered the evils of the Nazis. Both were thrown in prison. Falsworth's connections helped him but he could not help Aubrey, who was taken away. German scientists experimented upon Aubrey, while Falsworth became the 'Destroyer', fighting a guerrilla war against Germany. Aubrey is shrunk to just 12 inches (300 mm) in height, but manages to keep the strength of a full size man. He was brainwashed and sent to fight the Allies. He was eventually captured and reprogrammed. He joins the superhero team, the Crusaders, as Dyna-Mite. It is revealed in the 2002 series Citizen V and the V Battalion that Roger and Brian were lovers.

== Dynamic Man ==
Dynamic Man is a superhero appearing in American comic books published by Marvel Comics. The superhero was first published by Timely Comics, the forerunner of Marvel Comics during the period known to fans and historians as the Golden Age of Comic Books.

He was created by Daniel Peters and first appeared in Mystic Comics #1 (March 1940). He made his first modern age appearance in The Twelve.

Dynamic Man started out as an android created by scientist Professor Goettler. However, when the professor threw the switch to bring life to Dynamic Man, the excitement was too much for him, and he died. Dynamic Man resolves to use his amazing powers for the betterment of humanity, and flies away to civilization. He became an F.B.I. agent using the alias Curt Cowan. When not working for the F.B.I., he would don a costume and become the superhero Dynamic Man.
