= Pungi =

Wind instrument originating from the Indian subcontinent

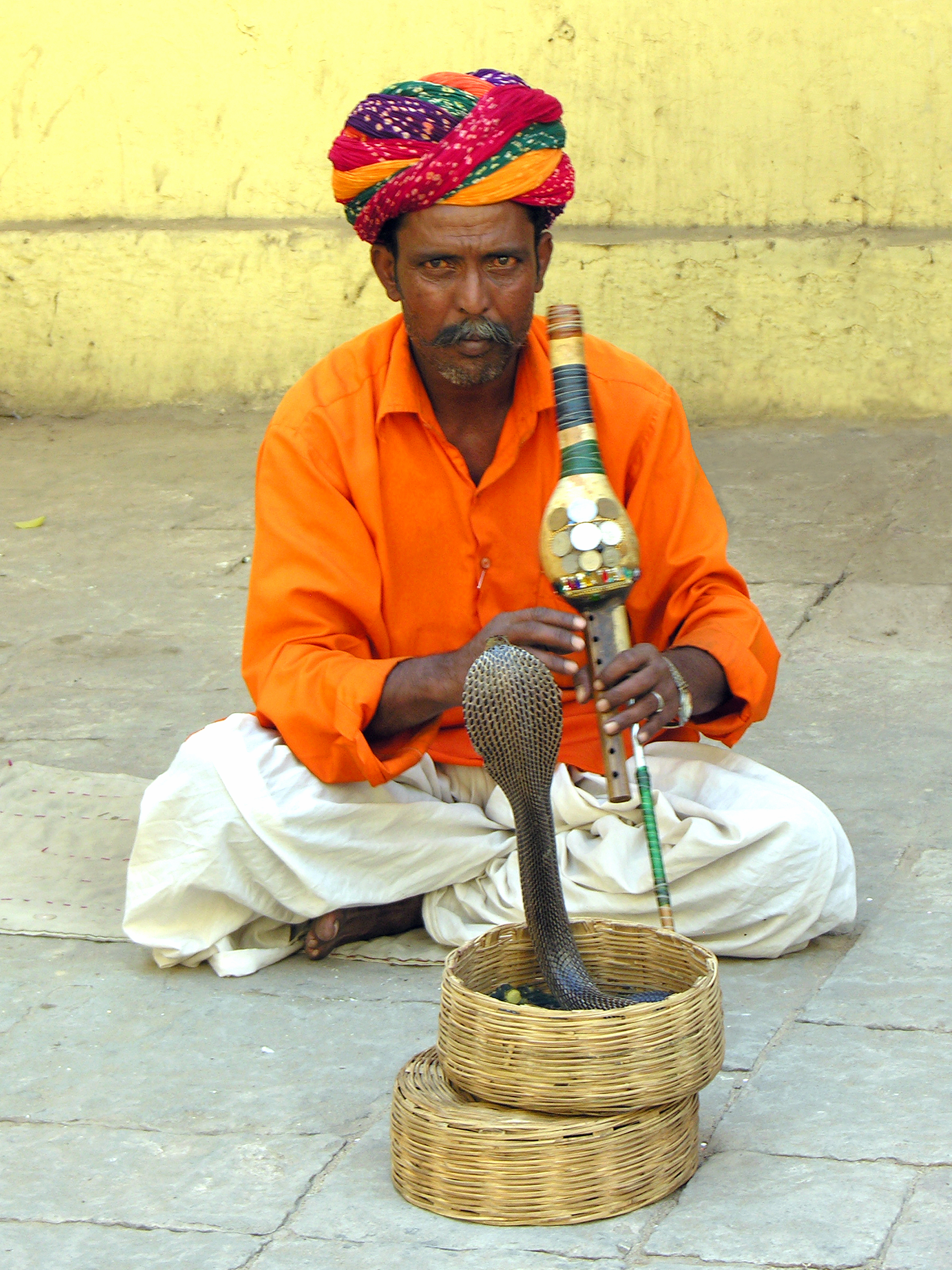

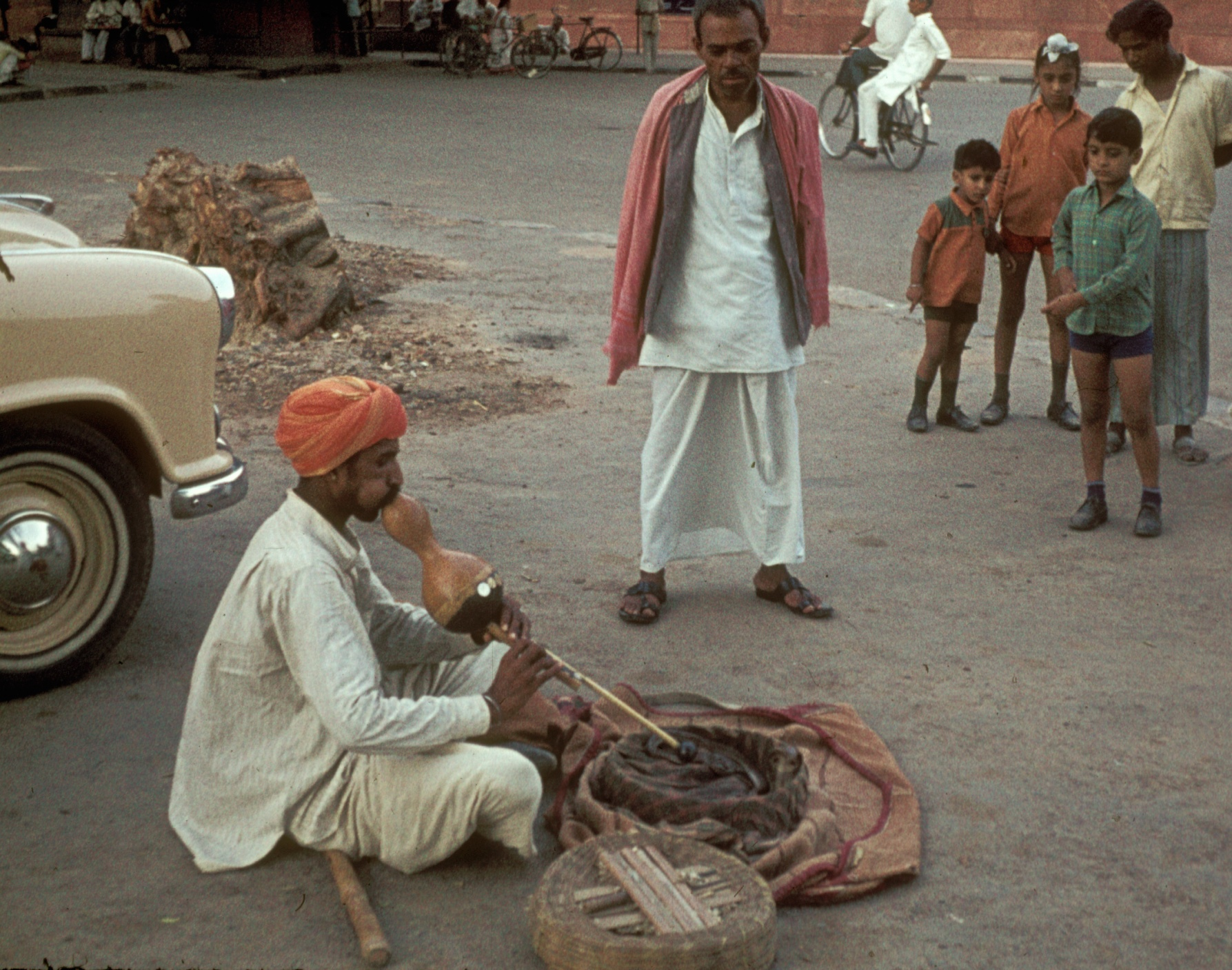
A man playing the pungi

The pungi, also known as bīn or Murli, is a musical instrument that originates from the Indian subcontinent. The instrument consists of a reservoir into which air is blown and then channelled into two reed pipes. It is played with no pauses, as the player employs circular breathing. In street performances, the pungi is used for snake charming.

== History ==
The pungi is a Hindu folk music reed pipe instrument that is mostly played by cobra charmers in Sindh and Rajasthan. The instrument is made from a dry hollowed gourd with two bamboo attachments. It is also a double-reed instrument. The pungi is played by Jogi in the Thar desert.

It is in particular played by snake charmers, mostly in the Terai and Nepal, to arouse snakes to dance.

The instrument has a high, thin tone and continuous low humming.

It has been an important instrument in Indian folk culture and is known by various names in different parts of India. In northern India, it is known as the been, tumbi, and bansi; in southern India, it is known as the magudi, mahudi, pungi, and pambaattikulhal.

== Construction ==
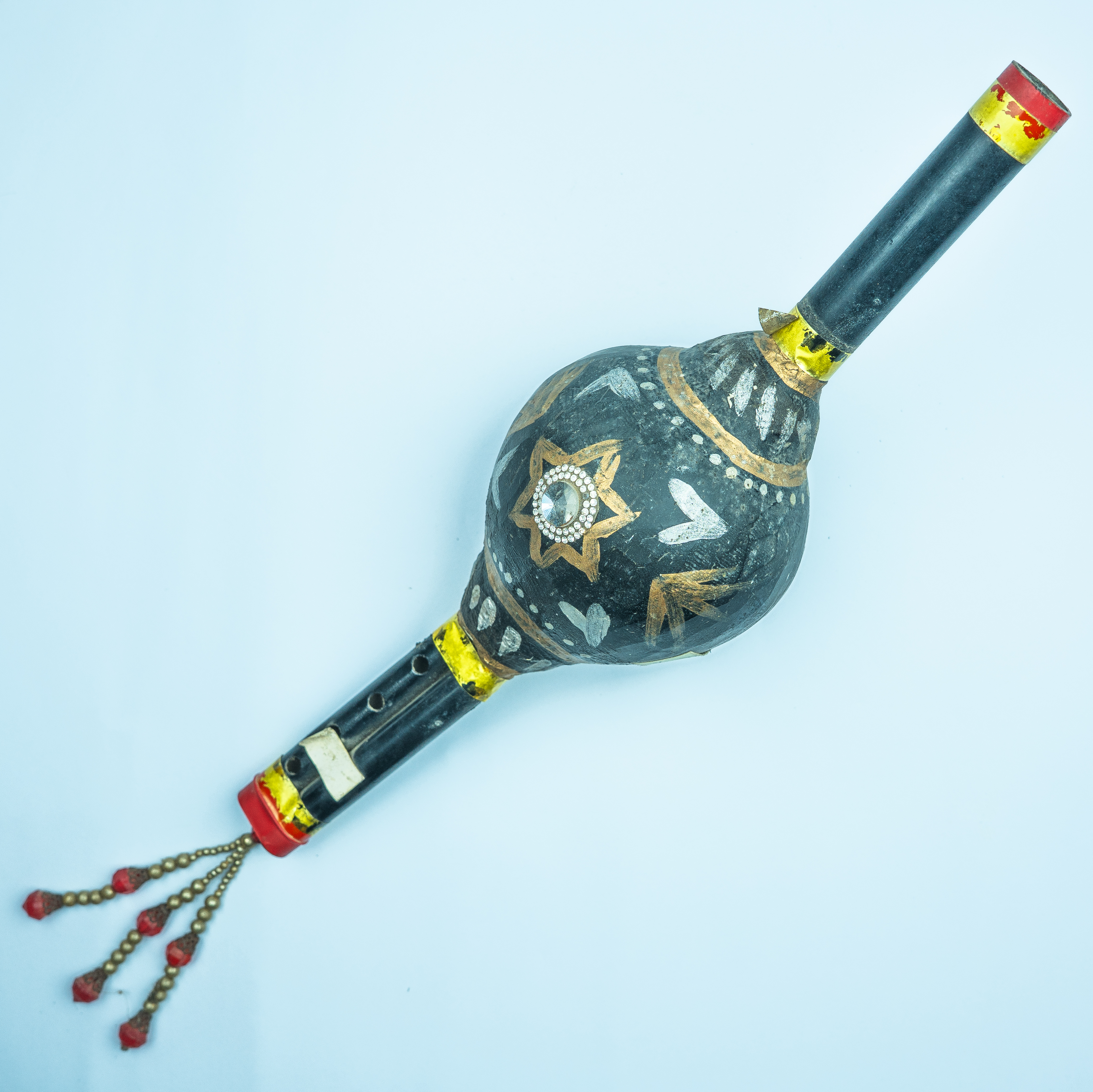
Pungi

The pungi is constructed from a solid coconut cover, to which pieces of bamboo are joined, and has two components: a hollow vessel constructed from a gourd, and two pipes, each with a free-beating single reed (jivala).

The player blows air through the top tube-like portion of the instrument. One pipe makes drone-like sounds. and the other produces the melody. The pipe that produces the melody has seven holes and a range of one octave. The drone pipe only has one hole. Traditionally, both sounds are played simultaneously using circular breathing to create a hypnotic effect.

The pungi is usually played solo, as it is difficult to play it with other instruments.

=== Ban on snake charming ===
The instrument was often used to entertain the public with snake charming. However, this practice was eventually banned throughout the country in 1991, under the Wildlife Protection Act, 1972.

== See also ==
- Hulusi, a similar Chinese instrument.
- Cimpoi, the Pungi's cousin.
- Bag pipes
- Bansuri
