= Snake charming =

Practice of appearing to hypnotise a snake

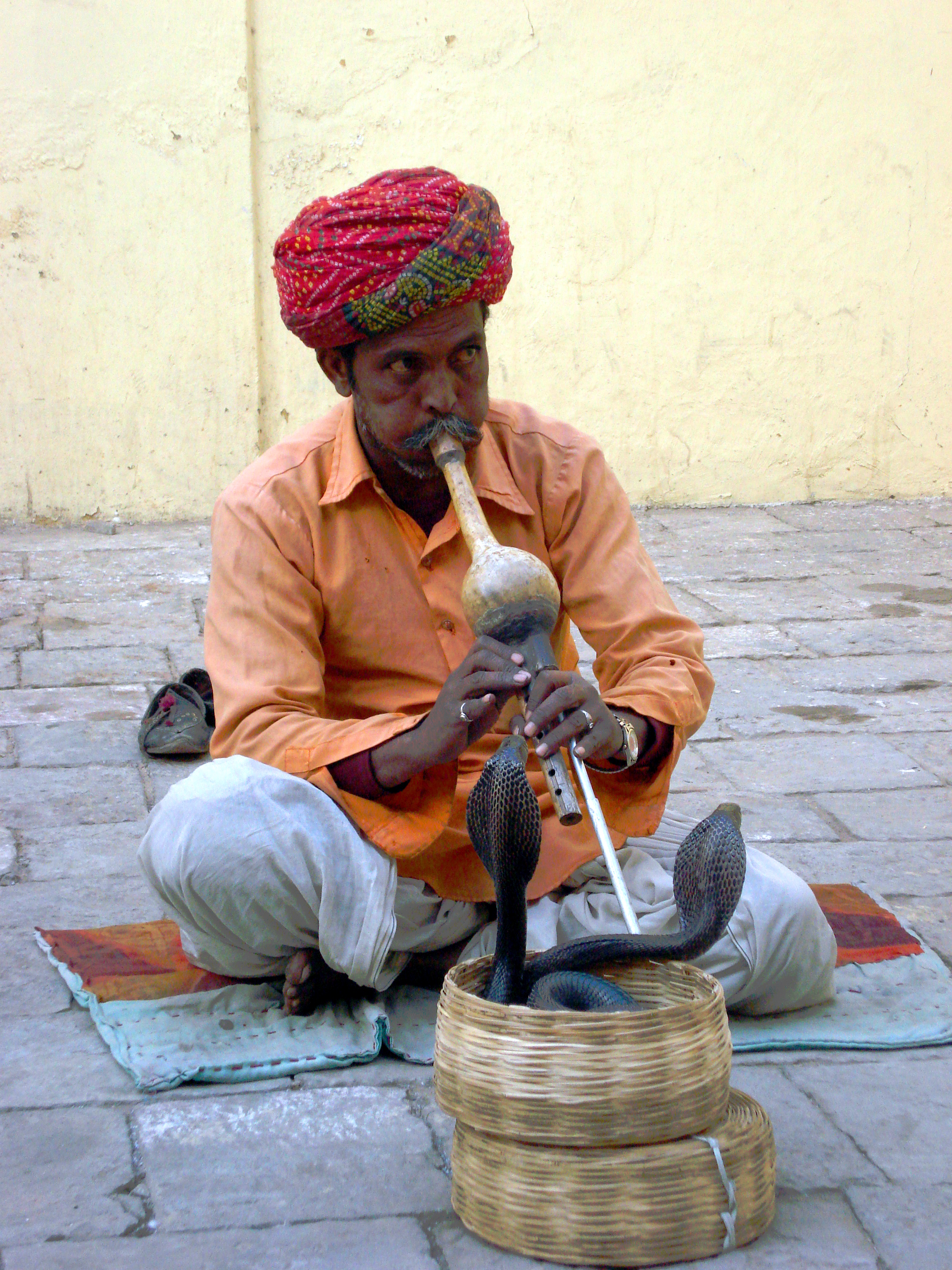
Snake charmer in Jaipur (India) in 2007

Snake charming is the practice of appearing to hypnotize a snake (often a cobra) by playing and waving around an instrument called a pungi. A typical performance may also include handling the snakes or performing other seemingly dangerous acts, as well as other street performance staples, like juggling and sleight of hand. Snake charming is a traditional performance practice associated with several regions, including ancient Egypt, North Africa, the Middle East, and South Asia.

In ancient Egypt, serpents held symbolic and ritual significance in religious and magical contexts. Musical instruments such as the Ney (~c. 3000 BCE) and the Mizmar (~Antiquity / Medieval period) are part of long-standing musical traditions in the Middle East and North Africa. In South Asia, the practice has also been documented in association with the Pungi (~Medieval period / c. 1000 CE), which is also used in snake charming performances. The practice was historically the profession of some tribesmen in Egypt. The practice was also the profession of some tribesmen in India into the 20th century, but snake charming declined rapidly after the government banned the practice in 1972. Snake-charmer performances still happen in other Asian nations such as Pakistan, Bangladesh, Sri Lanka, Thailand and Malaysia. The tradition is also practiced in North African countries such as Egypt, Morocco, Algeria and Tunisia.

Ancient Egypt was home to one form of snake charming, though the practice as it exists today likely arose in India. It eventually spread throughout South Asia, Southeast Asia, the Middle East, and North Africa. Despite a sort of golden age in the 20th century, the practice of snake charming has been declining since. This is due to a variety of factors, chief among them being the enforcement of the Wildlife Protection Act, 1972 in India banning ownership of snakes. In retaliation, snake charmers have organized in recent years, protesting the loss of their only means of livelihood, and the government has made some overtures to them. Snake charming is almost extinct in India.

Many snake charmers live a wandering existence, visiting towns and villages on market days and during festivals. During a performance, snake charmers may take a number of precautions. The charmer typically sits out of biting range and the snake is usually sluggish due to starvation or dehydration and reluctant to attack anyway. More drastic means of protection include removing the reptile's fangs or venom glands, drugging the snake, or even sewing the snake's mouth shut. The most popular species are those native to the snake charmer's home region, typically various kinds of cobras, though vipers and other types are also used.

Although snakes are able to sense sound, they lack the outer ear that would enable them to hear the music. They follow the movement of the charmer and the pungi that the charmer holds with his hands. The snake considers the person and pungi a threat and responds to it as if it were a predator.

== History ==
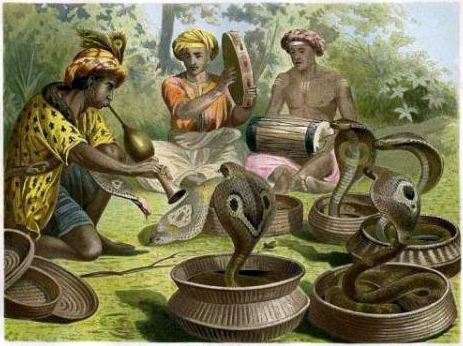
"Snakecharmers," a chromolithograph by Alfred Brehm

The earliest evidence for snake charming comes from ancient Egyptian sources. Charmers there mainly acted as magicians and healers. Part of their studies involved learning the various types of snake, the gods to whom they were sacred, and how to treat those who were bitten by the reptiles. Entertainment was also part of their repertoire, and they knew how to handle the animals and charm them for their patrons, but experts in that tradition were deported and employed in royal courts in Assyria and Persia.

One of the earliest records of snake charming appears in the Bible in Psalm 58:3–5: "The wicked turn aside from birth; liars go astray as soon as they are born. Their venom is like that of a snake, like a deaf serpent that does not hear, that does not respond to the magicians, or to a skilled snake-charmer."

Modern Snake charming originated in India. Hinduism has long held serpents to be sacred; the animals are believed to be related to the Nagas, and many gods are pictured under the protection of the cobra.

The earliest snake charmers are believed to have been traditional healers by trade. As part of their training, they learned to treat snake bites. Some also learned how to handle snakes, and people called on them to remove snakes from their homes. Snake charming became associated with the guru Baba Gulabgir. These snake charmers were associated with exorcists, physicians, and magical healers. The practice eventually spread to nearby regions, ultimately reaching North Africa, South Asia and Southeast Asia.

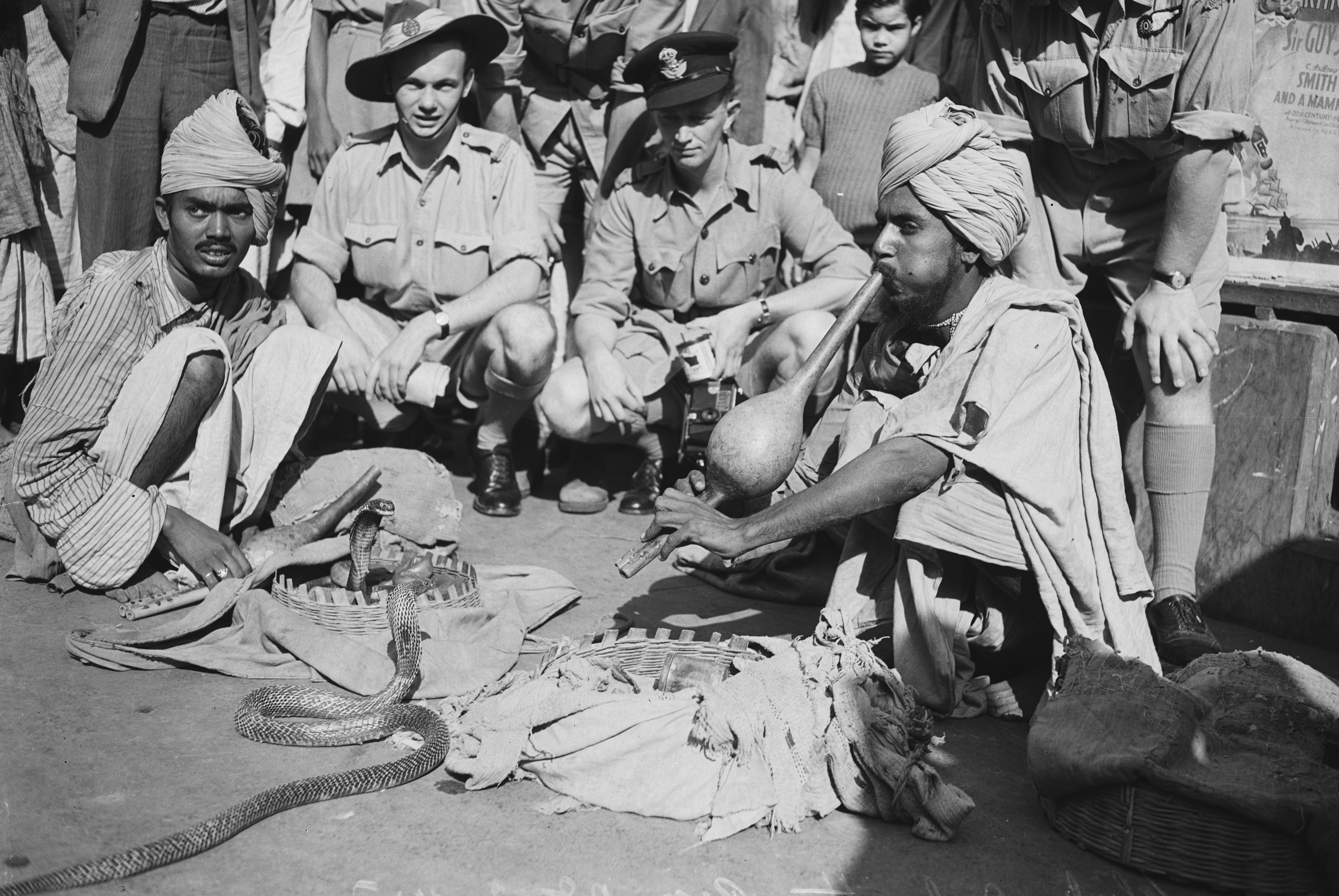
Snake Charmers in Kolkata, 1945, by Norman Herfort

The early 20th century proved something of a golden age for snake charmers. Governments promoted the practice to draw tourism, and snake charmers were often sent overseas to perform at cultural festivals and for private patrons. In addition, the charmers provided a valuable source of snake venom for creating antivenins.

The practice is no longer legal in India following changes to the Wildlife Protection Act. The law was originally passed in 1972, and aimed at preventing the export of snakeskins, introducing a seven-year prison term for owning or selling snakes. Beginning in the late 1990s, however, the law was also applied to the snake charmers. As a result, Indian charmers were forced to move their performances to less-travelled areas such as small villages or face legal action.

In 2003, hundreds of snake charmers gathered at the temple of Charkhi Dadri in Haryana to bring international attention to their plight. In December of the following year, a group of snake charmers stormed the legislature of the Indian state of Odisha with their demands while brandishing their animals. The Indian government and various animal-rights groups have acknowledged the problem. One suggested solution is to train the performers to be snake handlers, capturing and removing venomous snakes from city and suburban gardens. In return, they could sell their traditional medicines as souvenirs. Another proposal would try to focus attention on the snake charmers' music and treat them like other street musicians.

== Performance ==
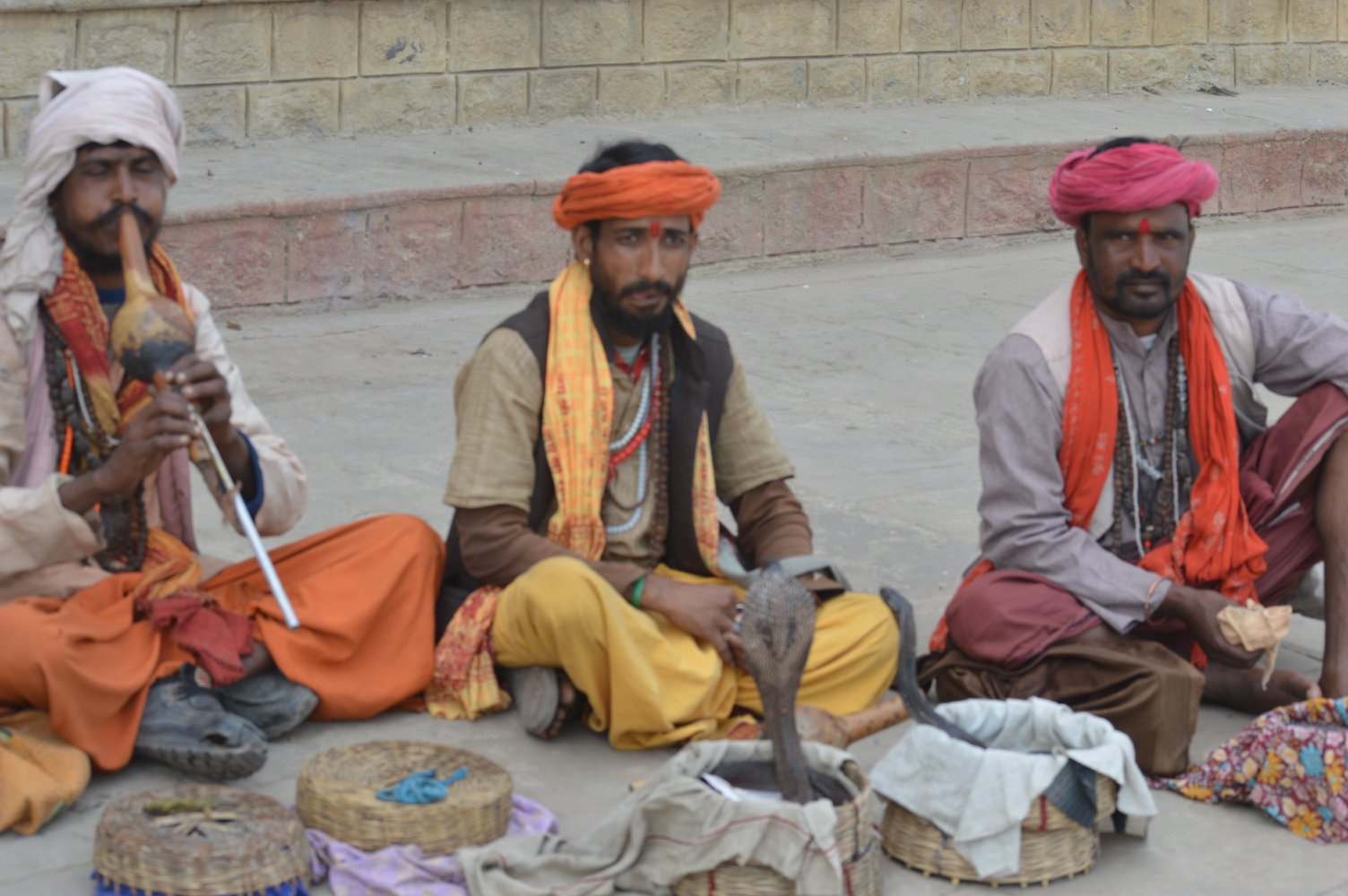
Snake charmers in Varanasi, India

Snake charmers typically walk the streets holding their serpents in baskets or pots hanging from a bamboo pole slung over the shoulder. Charmers cover these containers with cloths between performances. Dress in India, Pakistan and neighbouring countries is generally the same: long hair, a white turban, earrings, and necklaces of shells or beads. Once the performer finds a satisfactory location to set up, he sets his pots and baskets about him (often with the help of a team of assistants who may be his apprentices) and sits cross-legged on the ground in front of a closed pot or basket. He removes the lid, then begins playing a flute-like instrument made from a gourd, known as a been or pungi. As if drawn by the tune, a snake eventually emerges from the container; if a cobra, it may even extend its hood.

In the Western world, snake charming is very different. Western-style snake charmers use pythons and boa constrictors for their performances as they are not venomous. Western-style snake charmers do not use a musical instrument; instead they perform dance routines involving the snakes. These performances may be seen at carnivals, menageries, sideshows, and circuses.

== Snakes ==
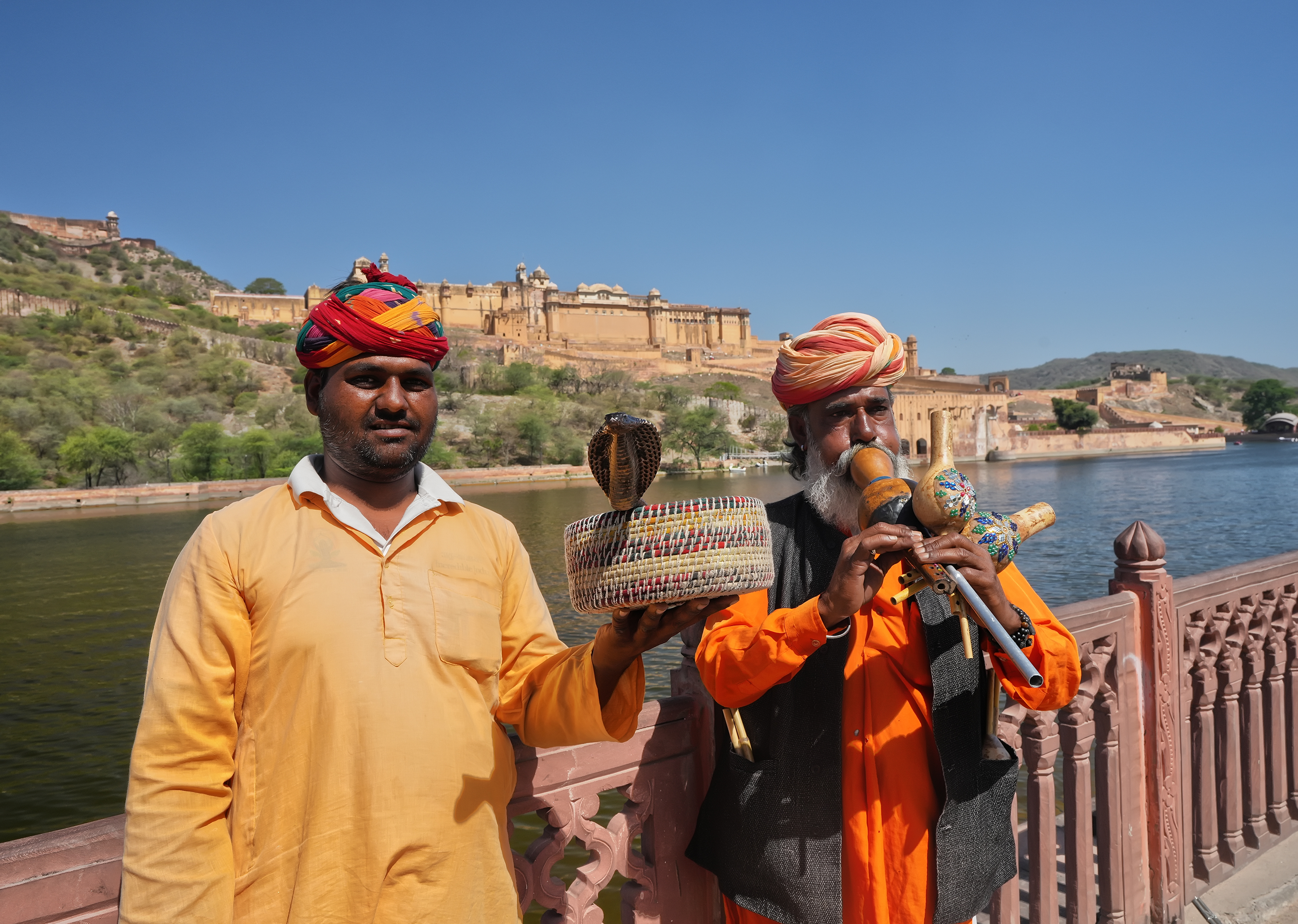
Snake charmer performing with a cobra near Amber Fort in Jaipur, Rajasthan, India.

Traditionally, snake charmers use snakes that they have captured themselves in the wild. This task is not too difficult, as most South Asian and North African snakes tend to be slow movers.

The exact species of serpents used varies by region. In India, the Indian cobra is preferred, though some charmers may also use Russell's vipers. Indian and Burmese pythons, and even mangrove snakes are also encountered, though they are not as popular. In North Africa, the Egyptian cobra, puff adder, carpet viper and horned desert viper are commonly featured in performances. In the UK, US and Europe pythons and boa constrictors are used to comply with Animal Handling and Animal Welfare Regulations.

== Ethical concerns ==
At home, snake charmers keep their animals in containers such as baskets, boxes, pots, or sacks.

For safety, some North African snake charmers stitch closed the mouth of their performing snakes, leaving just enough opening for the animal to be able to move its tongue in and out. Members of the audience in that region believe that the snake's ability to deliver venomous bites comes from its tongue, rather than fangs. Snakes subjected to this practice soon die of starvation or mouth infection, and must be replaced by freshly caught specimens. Venomoid surgery is used in India, where snakes are defanged and have their venom glands incapacitated; as well as having their mouth sewn shut being an option. They are then also kept in boxes or bags for 30–45 days and dehydrated so that their muscles cramp (making them sluggish) and so that they will drink the milk offered by devotees at festivals (the milk is undigestible to the snake).

Methods of dealing with the fangs include expert surgical removal of both the fangs and its replacement fangs, which has been done by some Native American and African snake charmers. This is done in order to prevent regrowth. Upon the loss of its fangs, a snake can quickly regrow them; barring extraordinary measures, pulled fangs are replaced within days. Fangs may also be plugged with wax or other material.

Venomoid surgery is employed to remove the risk of injury or death when handled, but is considered unethical and illegal in some cases. Most venomoid procedures consist of either removing the venom gland itself, or severing the duct between the gland and the fang. However, the duct and gland have been known to regenerate, and supposedly "safe" snakes have killed mice and successfully envenomated humans.

In West Africa, charmers have been observed to treat the snake's body and mouth with herbs that paralyze the jaw muscles and cause inflammation of the venom glands.

Members of the Pakkoku clan of Burma tattoo themselves with ink mixed with cobra venom on their upper body in a weekly inoculation which may protect them from the snake, though there is no scientific evidence of that.

== Lifestyle ==
Snake charming is typically an inherited profession. Most would-be charmers thus begin learning the practice at a young age from their fathers. Members of the Sapera or Sapuakela castes, snake charmers have little other choice of profession. In fact, entire settlements of snake charmers and their families exist in some parts of India and neighbouring countries. In Bangladesh, snake charmers are typically members of the nomadic ethnic group Bede. They tend to live by rivers and use them to boat to different towns on market days and during festivals.

North African charmers usually set up in open-air markets and souks for their performances. In coastal resort towns and near major tourist destinations one can see snake charmers catering to the tourist market, but in most of the region they perform for the local audiences; an important part of their income comes from selling pamphlets containing various magic spells (in particular, of course, against snake bites).

In previous eras, snake charming was often the charmer's only source of income. This is less true today, as many charmers also scavenge, scrounge, sell items such as amulets and jewelry, or perform at private parties to make ends meet. Snake charmers are often regarded as traditional healers and magicians, as well, especially in rural areas. These charmers concoct and sell all manner of potions and unguents that purportedly do anything from curing the common cold to raising the dead. Villagers and city dwellers alike often call on them to rid of snakes in houses.

== Gallery ==
Snake charming in art

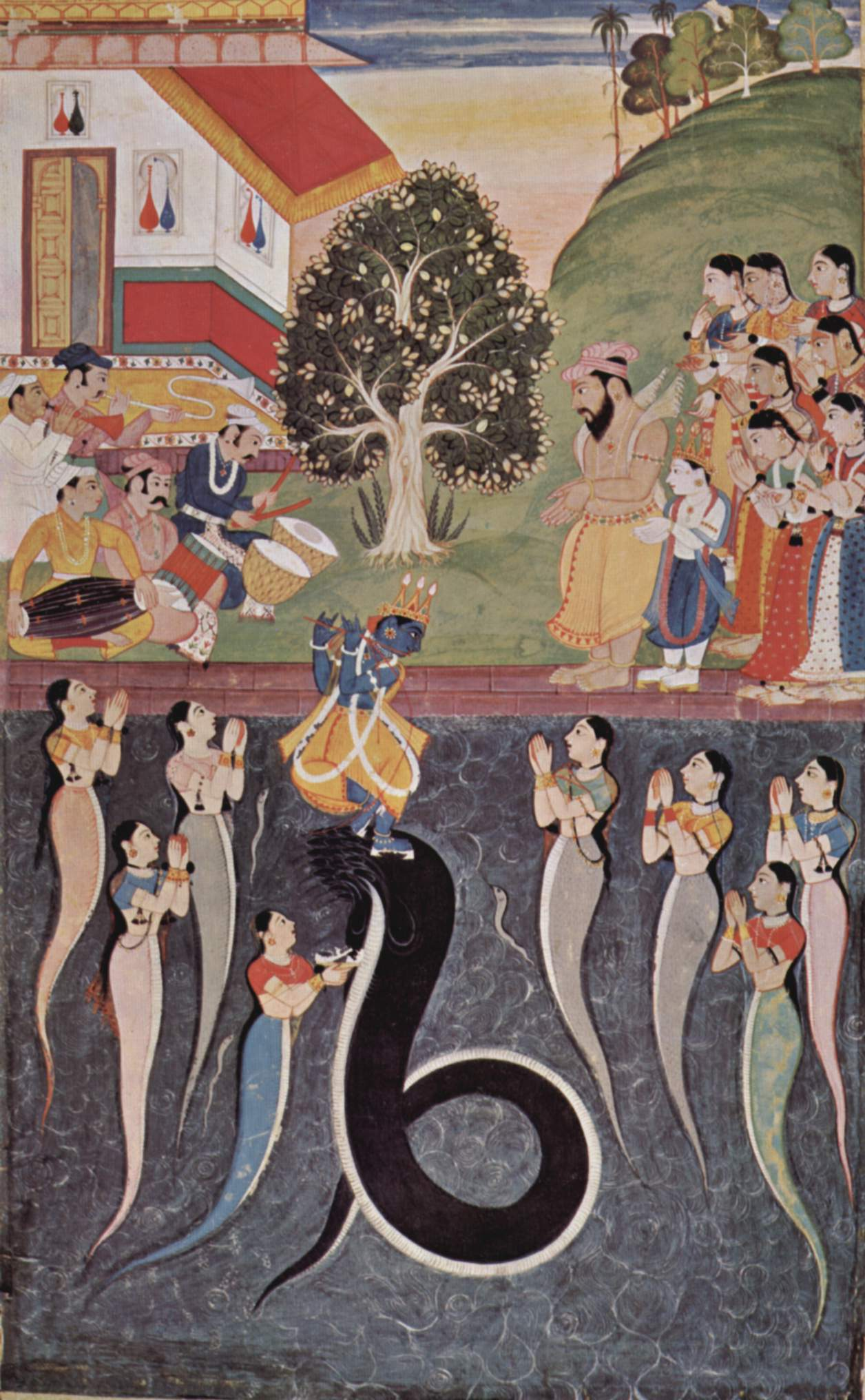
Snakes have long been popular subjects of Hindu art, Nāga, c. 1640, (miniature)

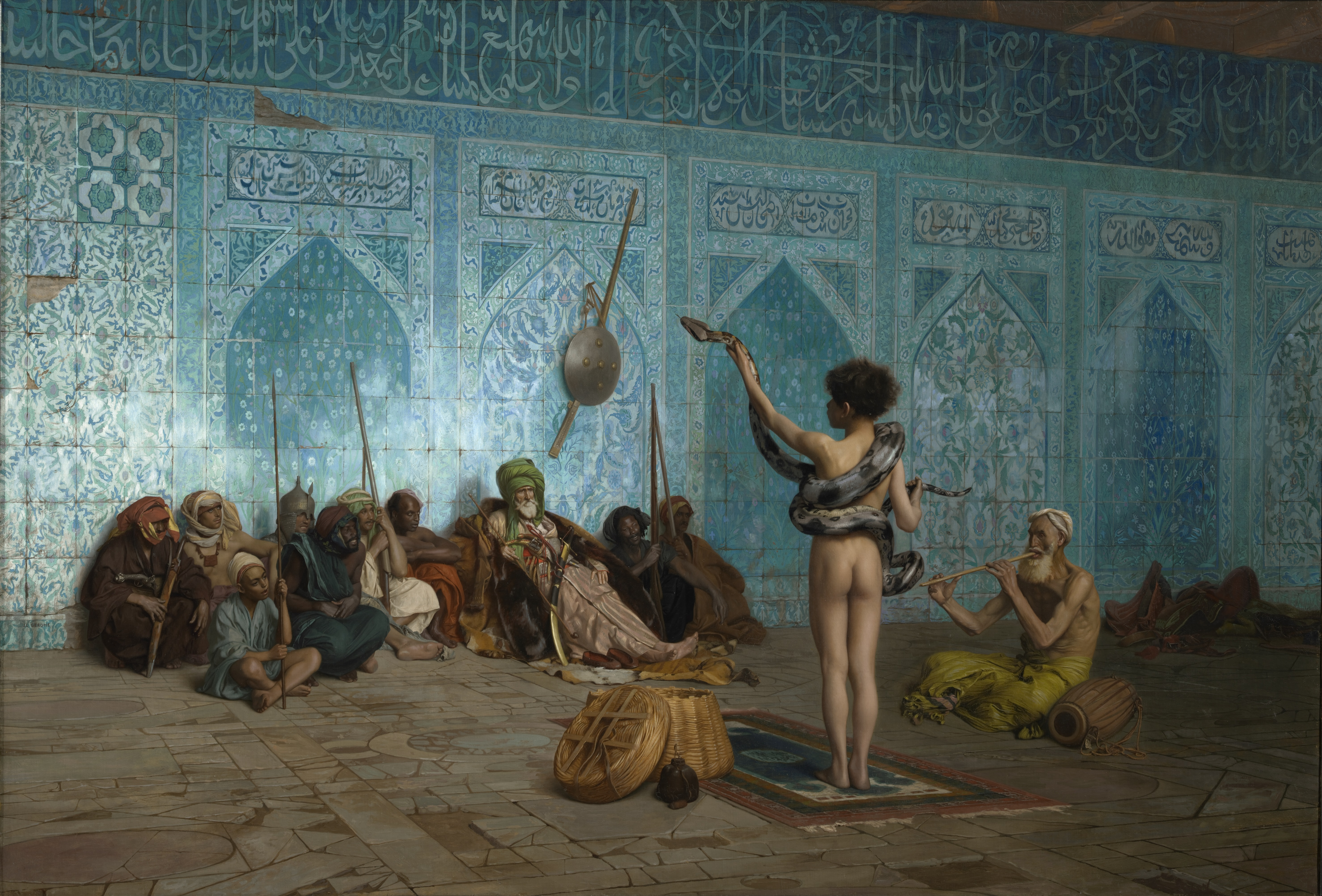
Jean-Léon Gérôme, Le charmeur de serpents, c. 1879

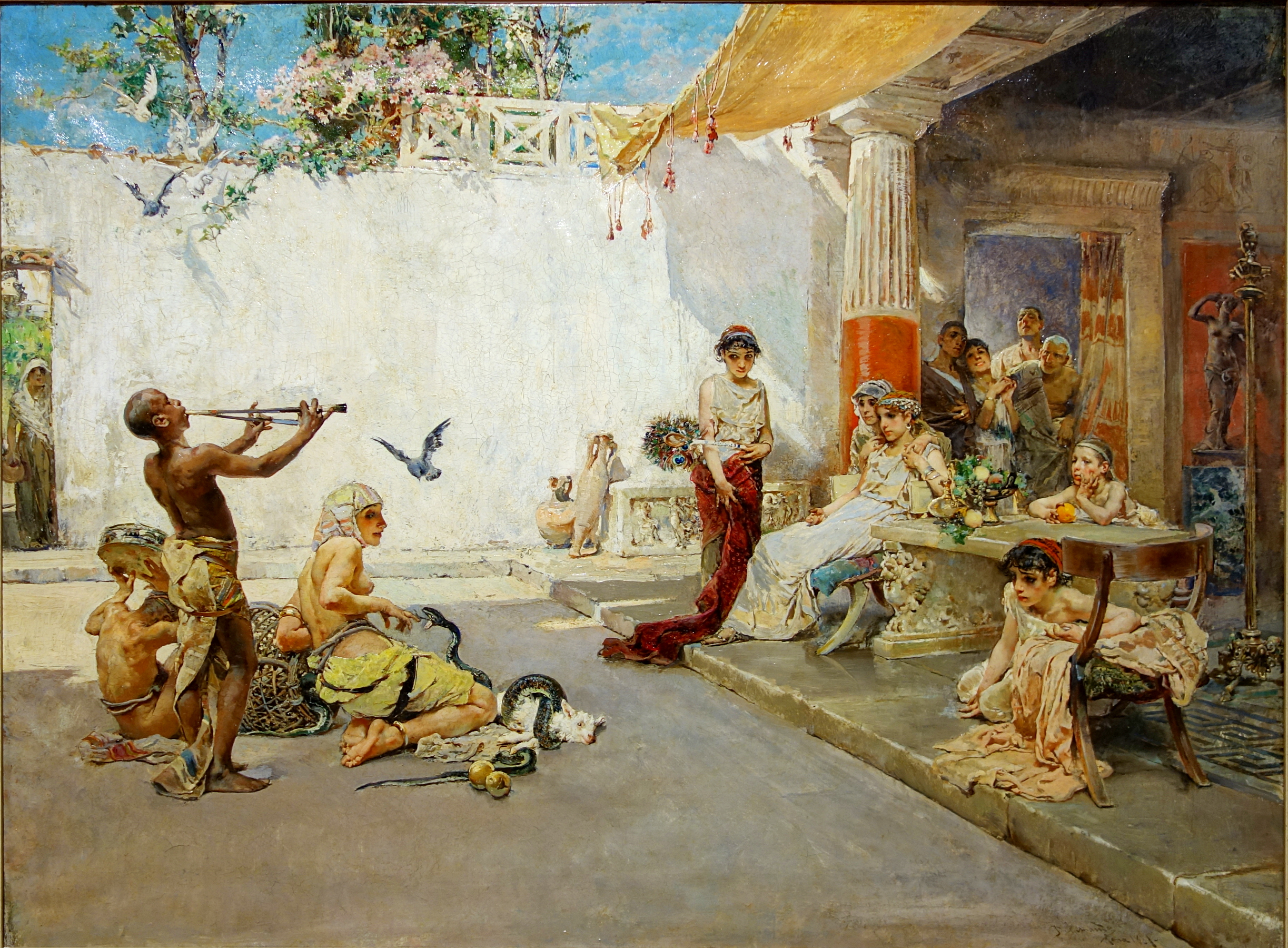
Daniel Hernández Morillo, La charmeuse de serpents, 1881

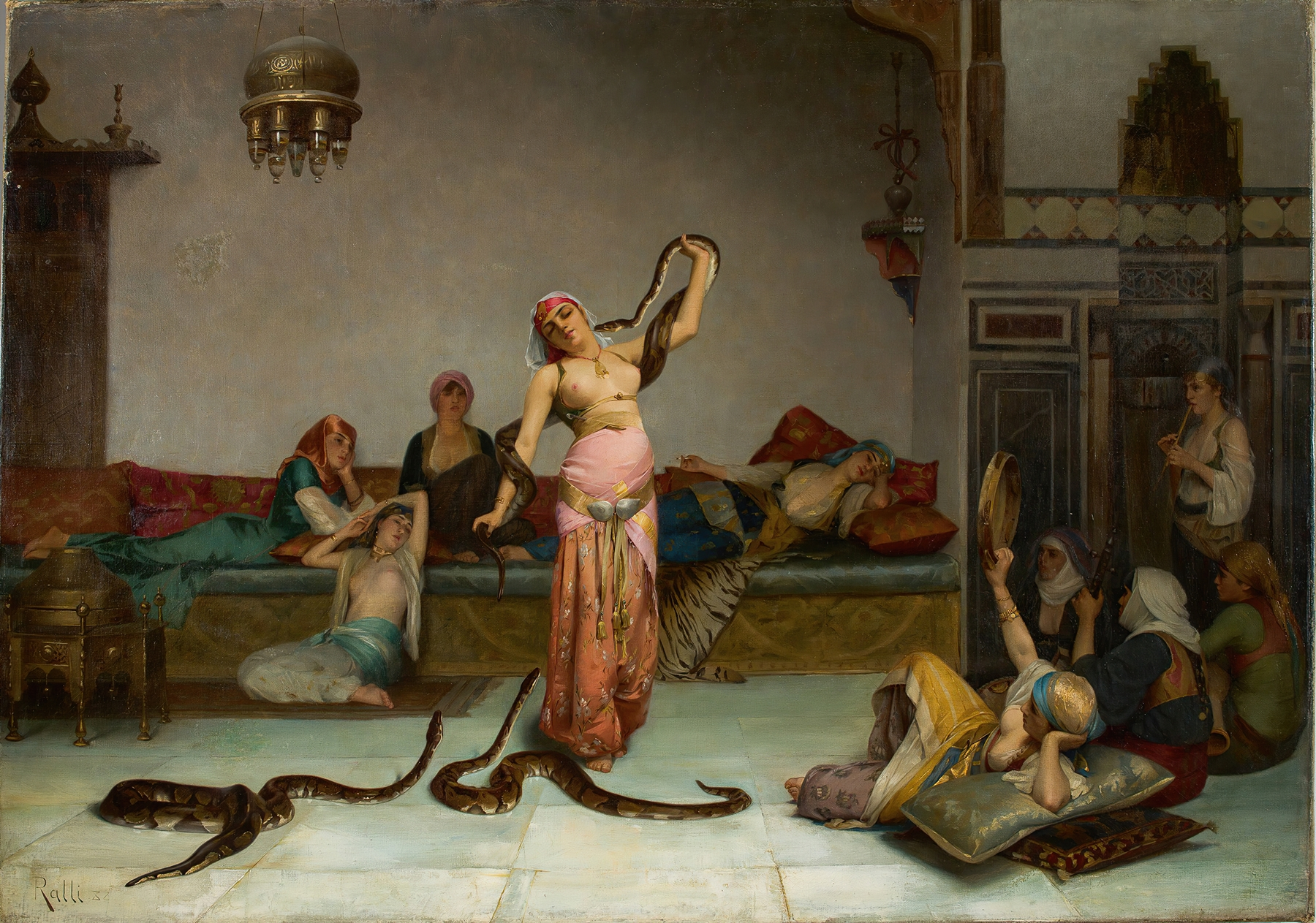
Théodore Ralli, Boa Charmer in a Harem at Cairo c. 1882

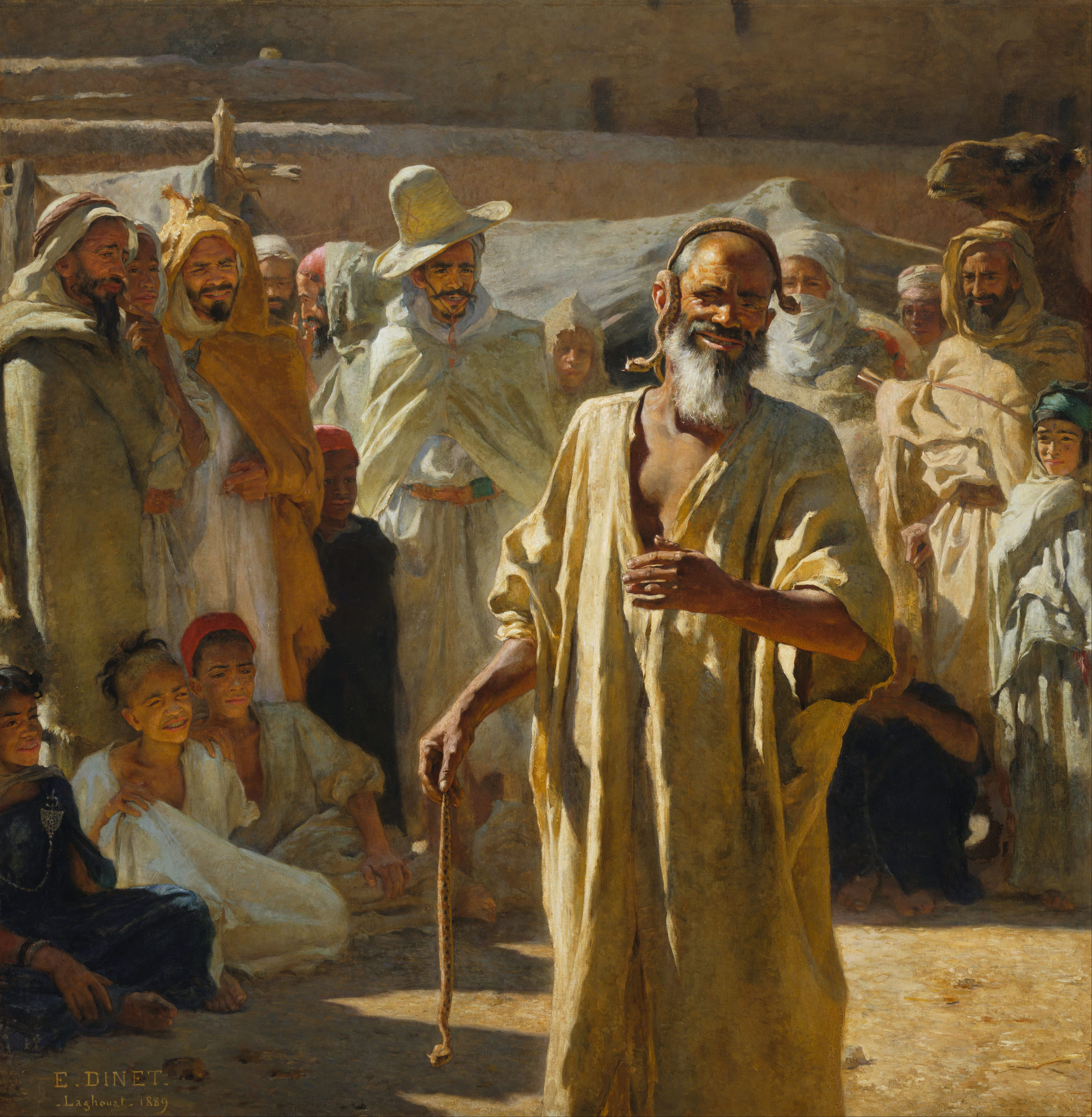
Étienne Dinet, The snake charmer, 1889

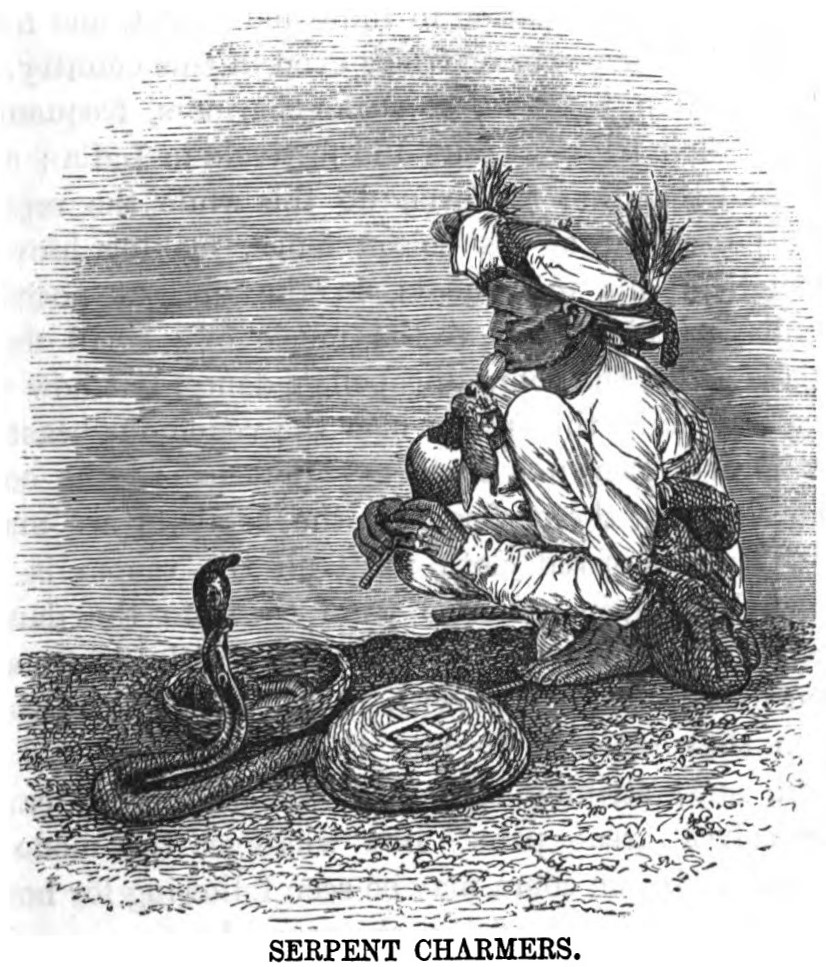
Serpent Charmers

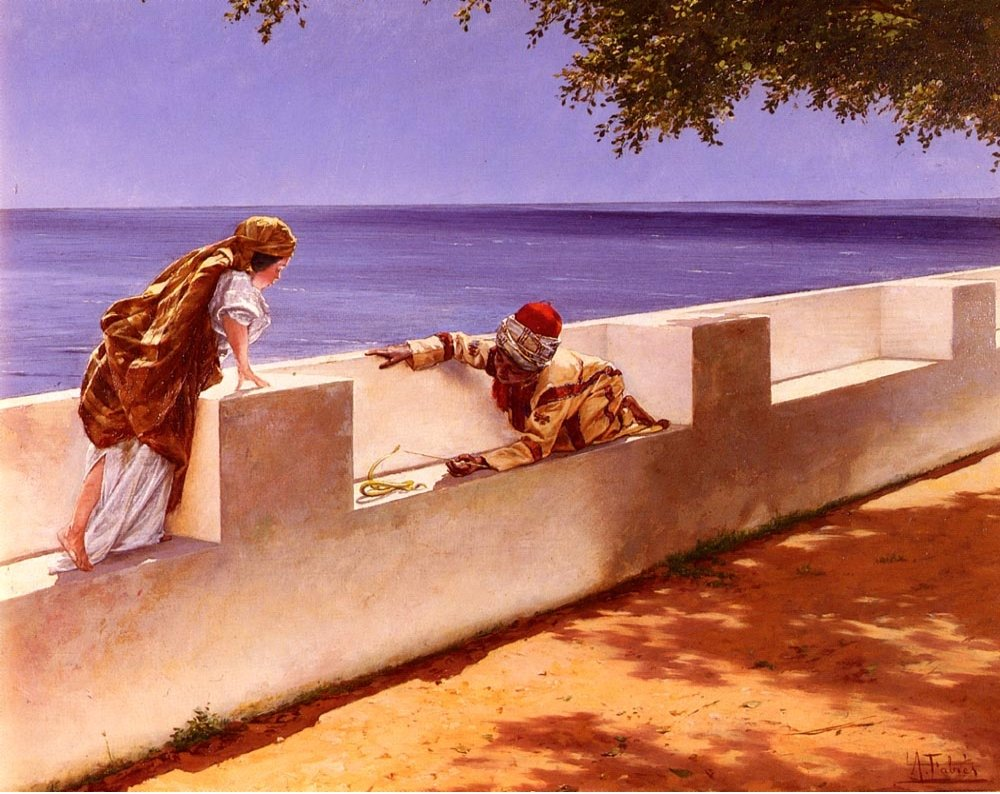
Antonio Fabres, The Young Snake Charmer

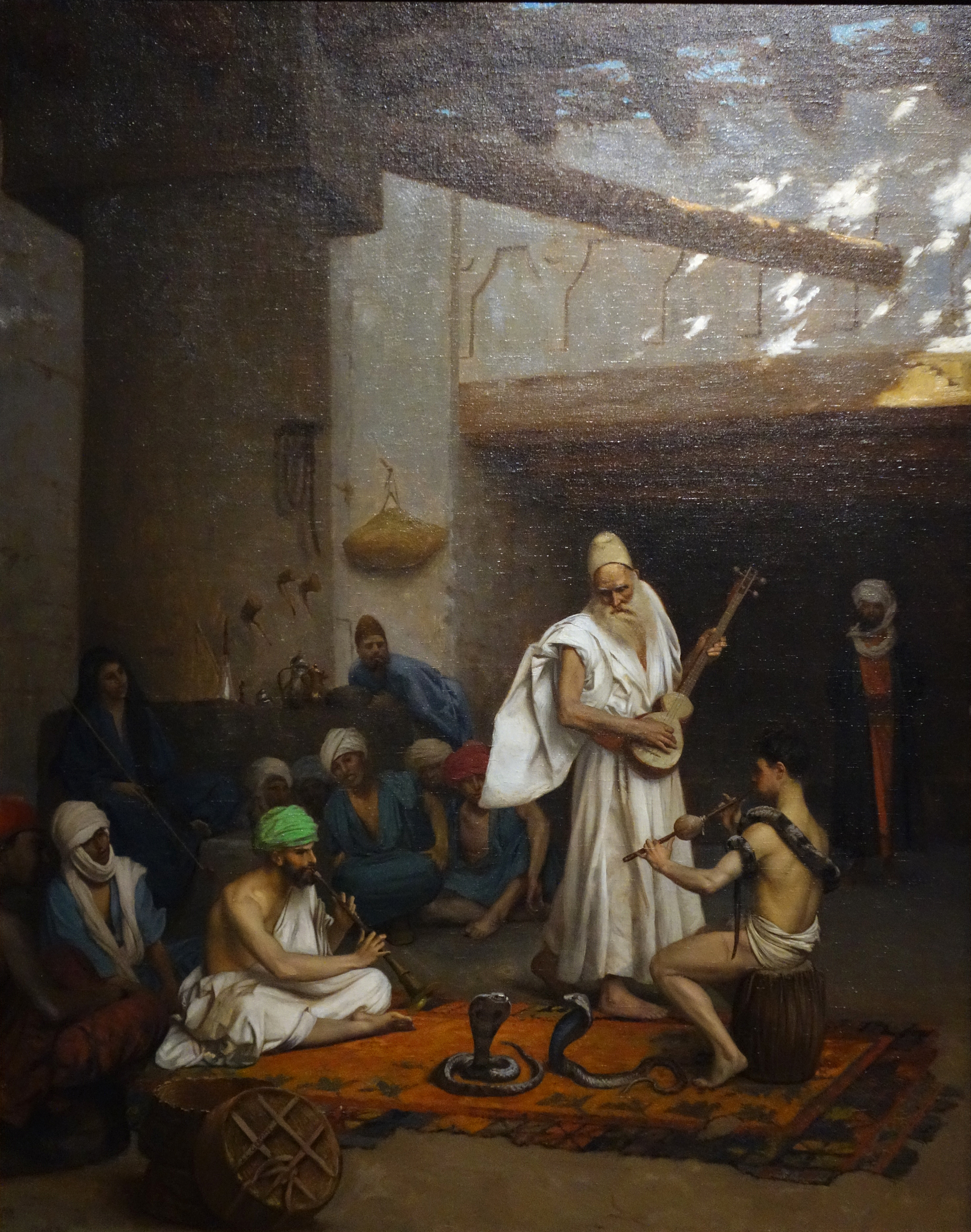
Jean-Léon Gérôme, The Snake Charmer, c. 1880-1890

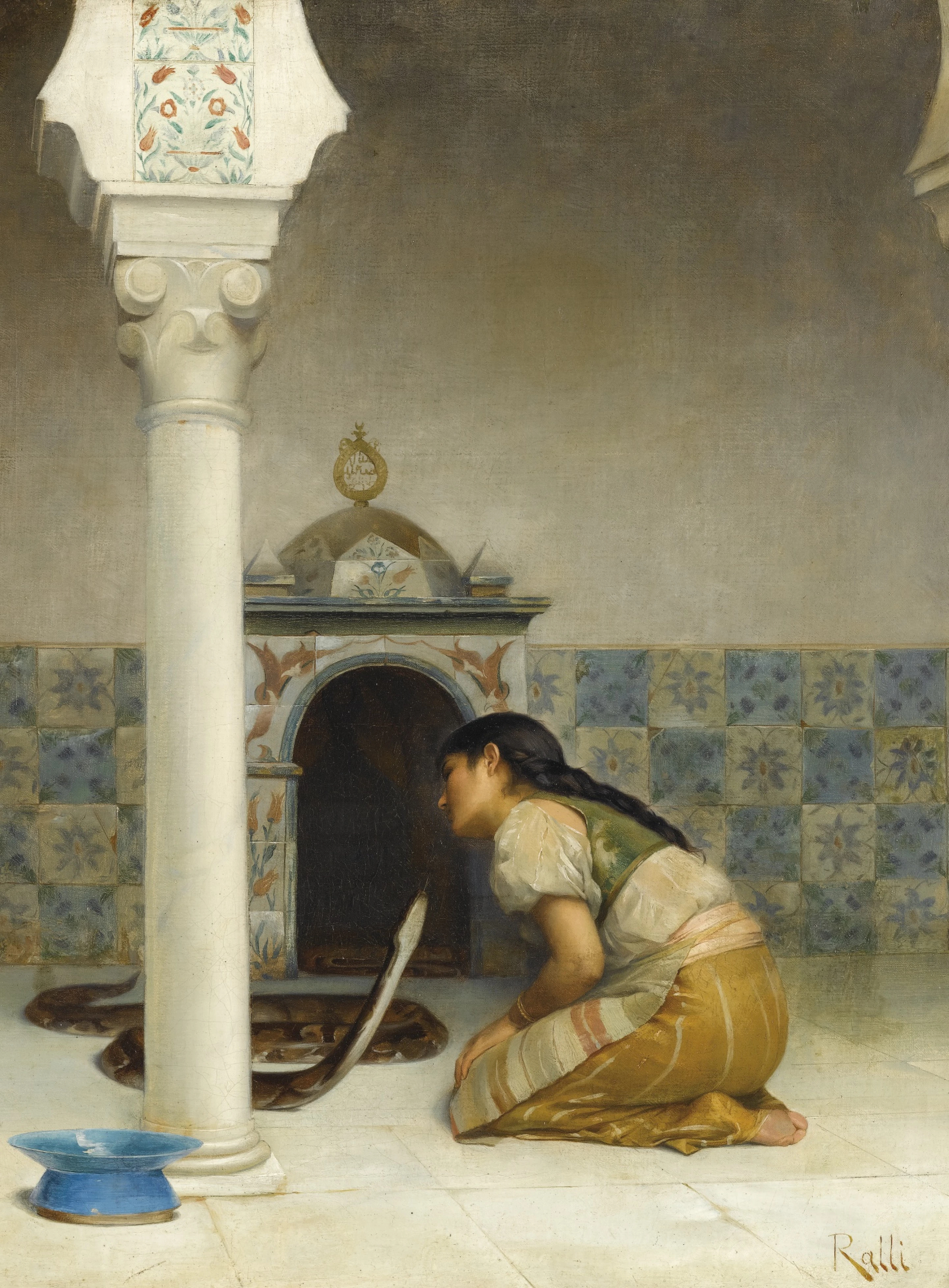
Théodore Ralli, The Sacred Serpent, c. 1880-1882

== See also ==
- Venomoid
- Snake handling, a religious ritual
- Worm charming
- Snake Shyam
