= Fat Man (comics) =

Fictional character in American comic books published by Marvel Comics

Fat Man is a fictional character appearing in American comic books published by Marvel Comics. The character first appeared in Kid Colt, Outlaw #117 (July 1964).

== Fictional character biography ==
Lee Portman was a 300-pound man from Australia who emigrated to the United States, where he started a crime spree wielding a boomerang, until he was stopped by Kid Colt. Later, he encountered the criminals Doctor Danger and Bennington Brown, and the three were contacted by Iron Mask, who invited them to join his newly-formed Circus of Crime. They accepted, but the gang was stopped by Kid Colt.

Fat Man later joined the second incarnation of the Circus under Iron Mask, which was put together to form a supervillain team, inspired by events triggered by the time-travelling Kang and Avengers. But before their gang could gain momentum, the bandits were stopped by Rawhide Kid, Two-Gun Kid, Phantom Rider and the time-stranded West Coast Avengers and sent to jail.
