= Venomoid surgery =

Surgery to remove venom from venomous snakes

Venomoid surgery is a surgical procedure performed on venomous snakes to prevent them from producing venom. The procedure has been used for snakes kept as pets or used in public demonstrations in order to remove the risk of injury or death when handled, but is considered unethical by some and is illegal in some jurisdictions. Most venomoid procedures consist of either removing the venom gland itself, or severing the duct between the gland and the fang. Removal of fangs is uncommon, as snakes frequently regenerate teeth, and the more invasive procedure of removing the underlying maxillary bone would be fatal. However, the duct and gland have been known to regenerate, and supposedly "safe" snakes have killed mice and successfully envenomated humans.

Advocates of this procedure state that it is done for safety reasons and have published methods for this surgery. However, this procedure is highly controversial among herpetologists, and is considered animal cruelty by many experts on venomous snakes, particularly in reference to the procedure being performed by unlicensed hobbyists with inadequate analgesia. For instance, a veterinarian review on reptile surgery published in 2006 stated that "such practices should be discouraged" due to both ethical and animal welfare concerns.

== Ruling of illegality in Victoria, Australia ==
The 1986 Prevention of Cruelty to Animals Act in the state of Victoria, Australia, states that animals must be anesthetized for the duration of any surgical operation. In a case involving the reptile showman and self-styled herpetologist Raymond Hoser, a tribunal ruled in 2008 that the Act (as amended in 2007) bans the removal of venom glands from snakes unless performed for a therapeutic reason by a registered veterinarian. In addition, the tribunal ruled that venomoid snakes cannot be handled by members of the public in Victoria, due to the risk of the venom glands regrowing.

== See also ==
- Snake charming
- Docking (animal)
- Onychectomy
- Veterinary ethics
