= Bob Forgione =

American cartoonist

- Born: Robert Forgione; 1929
- Died: 1994 (aged 64–65)
- Areas: penciller, inker
- Notable works: The Phantom

Robert (Bob) Forgione (1929–1994) was an American comic book and comic strip artist, best known for his work for Marvel Comics during the 1950s when it was also known as Atlas Comics. He studied at the New York Franklin School of Art. Around 1948 he became one of Jerry Robinson's assistants. Between 1951 and 1964, Forgione illustrated 341 comic stories, mostly for Atlas Comics, but also for Charlton, St. John Publications, American Comics Group, DC Comics and Dell Comics. Some of the series where his work appeared include Adventures Into the Unknown, All-American Men of War, Astonishing, Bat Masterson, Forbidden Worlds, Journey Into Unknown Worlds, Lassie, Marines in Battle, Mystic, Our Army at War, Out of the Night, Star Spangled War Stories, Strange Tales, The Thing (Charlton Comics) and Uncanny Tales. He also drew six startling covers for the horror series The Thing from Charlton. During the period of 1962–1963, Forgione worked as an uncredited penciller for the comic strip The Phantom alongside credited artist Sy Barry.
