= Midnight Sons =

Superhero teams from Marvel Comics

The Midnight Sons
- The Midnight Sons as they appear in Doctor Strange: Damnation #2 (May 2018). Left to right: Man-Thing, Moon Knight, Ghost Rider, Wong, Doctor Voodoo, Blade, and Elsa Bloodstone. Art by Greg Smallwood.

Publication information
- Publisher: Marvel Comics
- First appearance: Ghost Rider (vol. 3) #28 (August 1992) (as a vision); Ghost Rider (vol. 3) #31 (November 1992) (full appearance)
- Created by: Howard Mackie; Andy Kubert; Bobbie Chase

In-story information
- Base(s): Cypress Hills Cemetery, Sanctum Sanctorum, The Haven
- Leader(s): Blade; Johnny Blaze; Danny Ketch; Moon Knight; Morbius
- Member(s): Blade; Moon Knight; Clea Strange; Ghost Rider (Robbie Reyes); Daredevil; Previous members: Johnny Blaze; Caretaker; Darkhold Redeemers; • Sam Buchanan; • Louise Hastings; • Jinx (William Hastings); • Modred the Mystic; • Vicki Montesi; Doctor Strange; Elsa Bloodstone; Doctor Voodoo; Frank Drake; Daimon Hellstrom; The Hood (briefly); Iron Fist; Jennifer Kale; Danny Ketch; Hannibal King; Kushala the Spirit Rider; Magik; Man-Thing; Morbius; Nico Minoru; Scarlet Spider; Scarlet Witch (briefly); Strange; Vengeance; Werewolf by Night; Wolverine; Wong

The Midnight Sons are a team of supernatural superheroes appearing in American comic books published by Marvel Comics. Including Blade, Morbius, and the Ghost Riders Danny Ketch and Johnny Blaze, the original team first formed as part of the Rise of the Midnight Sons story arc, culminating in the first full team appearance in Ghost Rider (vol. 3) #31 (cover dated November 1992). Following the success of the crossovers, Marvel branded all stories involving the group with a distinct family imprint and cover treatment; this lasted from December 1993 to August 1994. The team has been revived several times with different characters, but the most frequent members include Morbius, Blade, and at least one Spirit of Vengeance.

== Publication history ==
The original Midnight Sons appeared in several 1990s multi-issue crossovers of Marvel's supernatural titles. The first, "Rise of the Midnight Sons," launched several books in the Midnight Sons line, including Morbius (September 1992), Darkhold: Pages from the Book of Sins (October 1992), and Nightstalkers (November 1992). The team consisted of "the Nine": Blade, Morbius, Danny Ketch (as a Ghost Rider), John Blaze (as a human), Frank Drake, Hannibal King, Vicki Montesi, Louise Hastings, and Sam Buchanan.

The group appeared in the nine-issue anthology comic book Midnight Sons Unlimited, which ran from April 1993 to May 1995 and tied into the crossover events.

Their final crossover was the seventeen-part "Siege of Darkness" which ran from December 1993 to January 1994. It was featured in two consecutive issues of each Midnight Sons title as well as four issues of Marvel Comics Presents (#143-146), and two issues of Doctor Strange, a title that was newly included in the line. It was advertised with an eight-page insert in several comics in October, November, and December 1993. According to the text of the advertisement, written by Jeffrey Lee Simmons.

For the first time in the history of Marvel, one of our family groups is getting its own distinct family imprint and cover treatment. On the outside of the books, this means all titles in the family will share a new cover symbol, the Midnight Sons dagger as well as similar cover treatments. Inside, the Midnight Sons titles will have stronger continuity, making for a more exciting, tightly knit sub-section of the Marvel Universe.

The advertisement also claimed the Midnight Sons was the "first distinct family group."

"Siege of Darkness," however, marked the cancellation of Darkhold: Pages from the Book of Sins, and the Midnight Sons brand did not last much longer. Nightstalkers only lasted three more issues. A Blade and Blaze series failed to catch interest. The Midnight Sons logo was eventually dropped from the remaining titles, cover-dated September 1994, although Morbius, Blade, Blaze, Doctor Strange, Ghost Rider (vol. 3), Marvel Comics Presents and the final three issues of Midnight Sons Unlimited continued on under the normal Marvel logo.

The Marvel Edge imprint debuted in 1995, incorporating some of the same ongoing titles as Midnight Sons, including Doctor Strange: Sorcerer Supreme and Ghost Rider.

In 2009, a different incarnation of the team was featured in Marvel Zombies 4 after being teased in Marvel Zombies 3. More like the Legion of Monsters than a traditional Midnight Sons line-up, this team included Morbius, Daimon Hellstrom, Jennifer Kale, Werewolf by Night, and Man-Thing. The Hood briefly assisted. The story was loosely continued in Punisher: Frankencastle and Legion of Monsters.

An unnamed team similar to the Midnight Sons appeared in the five-issue Spirits of Vengeance series in 2017 by Victor Gischler and David Baldeón. This series featured Johnny Blaze, Daimon Hellstrom, Blade, and Satana.

In February 2017, Moon Knight artist Greg Smallwood expressed interest in a revamped version of the Midnight Sons, featuring a team composed of Moon Knight, Blade, Ghost Rider, Doctor Strange, Punisher, Daimon Hellstrom, Jennifer Kale and Hannibal King. Although this never came to pass, Smallwood did contribute variant covers for Doctor Strange: Damnation by Donny Cates, Nick Spencer, and Rod Reis, which featured another modern Midnight Sons team: Wong, Blade, Doctor Voodoo, Elsa Bloodstone, Johnny Blaze, Moon Knight, Iron Fist, Scarlet Spider, and Man-Thing.

In September 2022, a new limited series was released, entitled Midnight Suns. The 5-issue miniseries was written by Ethan Sacks with art by Luigi Zagaria. While not directly connected to the Midnight Suns video game of the same year, the two concurrent versions featured loose similarities in both name and roster. The comic team featured Blade, Kushala the Spirit Rider, Magik, Wolverine, and Nico Minoru.

Shortly after, Marvel announced another miniseries in 2024. Coming from writer Bryan Hill and artist Germán Peralta, Midnight Sons: Blood Hunt will tie into Marvel's summer-long Blood Hunt event. Along with the return of the classic name, the book is also expected to feature most of the original Midnight Sons together again for the first time since 1994. The cast so far is confirmed to include Blade, Johhny Blaze, Danny Ketch, and Victoria Montesi.

The most recent incarnation of the Midnight Sons was formed in Marc Spector: Moon Knight (2026), written by Jed MacKay and illustrated by Devmalya Pramanik. When a supernatural entity known as Mansion Ravenous abducts Moon Knight’s friends and allies, including Tigra, Marc Spector seeks the help of Clea, who uses magic to identify three heroes capable of helping him rescue them. Moon Knight subsequently recruits Blade, Ghost Rider (Robbie Reyes), and Daredevil (Matt Murdock), assembling a new incarnation of the Midnight Sons. This team was assembled for a specific mission and was not meant to be an ongoing team.

== Team biography ==
=== Rise of the Midnight Sons ===
The team is formed by Ghost Riders, Danny Ketch and Johnny Blaze after Ghost Rider receives a vision in which he learns that Lilith, Mother of All Demons (not Dracula's daughter, another Marvel character of the same name) is being resurrected and poses a great threat. She plans to use her demon children, the Lilin, to take over Earth. Though Lilith has many children, she has four children who are very loyal to her. Their names are Pilgrim, Nakota, Meatmarket, and the most powerful of the four, Blackout, Ghost Rider's old enemy (Blackout was not an actual child of Lilith originally, but rather a grandchild. He was later killed and Lilith gave birth to Blackout along with her other children, thus indeed making him one of her actual children). Though she would have a lot more of her children to help her, the rest had forsaken Lilith. After she is imprisoned, many of the Lilin are either scattered or killed. Those who are scattered forget the ways of Lilith and move on with their lives, except Lilith's most faithful servants.

The team consists of the Nightstalkers (Eric Brooks / Blade, Frank Drake and Hannibal King) Morbius, the Living Vampire, the Spirits of Vengeance (Danny Ketch / Ghost Rider, Johnny Blaze / Ghost Rider, and later Michael Badilino / Vengeance), and the guardians of the Darkhold, the Darkhold Redeemers (Sam Buchanan, Victoria Montesi, Louise Hastings, and later Modred the Mystic and Jinx). While secretly assembling the team and the sub-teams within, from behind the scenes, Doctor Strange does not officially join the team until the Siege of Darkness storyline.

=== Midnight Massacre ===
The second major meeting between the Midnight Sons occurs when Blade, with a page from the Darkhold, becomes the demonic creature Switchblade. He kills most of the Midnight Sons, subsequently taking on the power and weapons of each. He is finally stopped when Louise Hastings uses a counter spell from the Darkhold.

=== Siege of Darkness ===
The Midnight Sons family imprint

The "Siege of Darkness" consists of two subsequent stories in which the Midnight Sons fight groups connected with villains Lilith and Zarathos. In the first story arc, covers were black with vague outlines, and the Midnight Sons fight the Lilin, who are invading the earth in a mysterious smoke emanating from Cypress Hills Cemetery. This arc include the Lilin characters Bad Timing, Martine Bancroft, Blackout, Dark Legion, Meatmarket, Nakota, Outcast, Pilgrim, Sister Nil, Stonecold, and Bloodthirst, who is possessing Morbius. In the second story arc, covers featured a dripping blood design, and the Midnight Sons fight The Fallen, a group loyal to Zarathos. The Fallen include Atrocity, Embyrre, Metarchus, Patriarch, and Salomé.

==== The Lilin ====
At the beginning of the story, Ghost Rider and Blaze tell the Nightstalkers, the Darkhold Redeemers, and Morbius that they have killed Lilith and Zarathos. The Nightstalkers, who are skeptical, investigate but find mist containing Lilin now emanating from Cypress Hills Cemetery. As the other Midnight Sons join the fight, they discover that, instead of killing Lilith and Zarathos, Ghost Rider and Blaze have opened a portal to Shadowside where the Lilin had been exiled. They split into two groups, one led by Ghost Rider and one led by Morbius. Caretaker, Doctor Strange and Vengeance also join the fight. Caretaker claims Zarathos is more powerful and they must protect the Medallion of Power. Doctor Strange teleports Ghost Rider's group to his Sanctum Sanctorum. They find out from some Lilin that Morbius' team has a traitor. The team following Morbius, which includes Louise Hastings, hide out in one of Morbius' old labs. Louise Hastings finds out Morbius has been infected by Lilin blood, and Morbius secretly kills her. Morbius has been taken over by the Lilin Bloodthirst. He then requests entry into Doctor Strange's Sanctum Sanctorum. Unaware that Morbius has been possessed, Doctor Strange allows him to enter which allows other Lilin to follow. Doctor Strange convinces Morbius to fight the control of Bloodthirst. Doctor Strange then casts a spell that causes the Sanctum Sanctorum to explode. The Spirits of Vengeance then confront Lilith and Zarathos in Cypress Hills Cemetery and use the Medallion of Power to send Lilith and the Lilin back to Shadowside. The Medallion of Power disappears.

==== The Fallen ====
After Lilith is exiled, it appears as if a group called The Fallen, loyal to Zarathos, has returned from exile. The Fallen are an offshoot of The Blood, the group to which Caretaker belongs. The Fallen left The Blood to follow the wizard Zarathos. The Fallen quickly beat the Midnight Sons and take Caretaker captive. The Midnight Sons regroup at The Nightclub, and Caretaker sends a message that The Fallen plan to recruit or kill surviving members of The Blood. The Midnight Sons then find James Raydar, Patriarch and Truthsayer with varying degrees of success; Patriarch joins Zarathos, Truthsayer is killed by Modred, and James Raydar joins the Midnight Sons along with Embyrre, Raydar's daughter and one of The Fallen who turns against Zarathos when she sees Morbius' nobility. Meanwhile, Victoria Montesi finds out that she has been impregnated with Chthon. Doctor Strange helps her just as he is being attacked by Salomé, one of The Fallen, who claims she is the rightful Sorceress Supreme. Doctor Strange disappears into another dimension and places Victoria Montesi in a mystical stasis. In his place appears Strange, a mystical construct Doctor Strange based loosely on himself. Strange joins the rest of the Midnight Sons in the fight against The Fallen. Ghost Rider confronts Zarathos one on one, and Ghost Rider is apparently destroyed and his power absorbed into Zarathos. The Midnight Sons then fight Patriarch, Metarchus, and Atrocity to a standstill, and the Fallen retreat. Caretaker reveals that there is one more member of The Blood they have not contacted, Foundry. The Midnight Sons track down Foundry who gives them a sword called Justiciar. She claims it must be tempered in her own blood and sacrifices herself. Blade then uses Justiciar to kill Patriarch, Metarchus, and Atrocity with the help of the other Midnight Sons. They believe the destruction of The Fallen will weaken Zarathos. They attack Zarathos directly. Embyrre and James Raydar also attack and are killed. Ghost Rider, whose spirit was absorbed by Zarathos, now apparently attacks him from within and Blade stabs Zarathos with Justiciar. Zarathos, with the sword through his chest, turns to stone. Johnny Blaze, Vengeance, Morbius, Blade, Hannibal King, Strange, and Caretaker then go through a ceremony in which they are branded with the symbol of the flaming dagger. Caretaker says they have become the successors to the original 'Order of the Midnight Sons'. This brand is placed on the arms of all the members of the new team aside from Frank Drake, a member of the Nightstalkers and a human descendant of Dracula and the Ghost Rider who had apparently been destroyed. Drake was disallowed from taking the brand due to his relative normalcy compared to the other members who were supernaturally afflicted and destined to be outsiders. He was allowed, however, to be an associate member.

=== Marvel Zombies ===
A new Midnight Sons team is sanctioned by A.R.M.O.R., a government agency that monitors and polices alternate realities from Earth-616. The team is chosen by Morbius, who enlists Daimon Hellstrom, Jennifer Kale, and Werewolf by Night to contain the zombie virus outbreak from further spreading into the 616 universe. The team makes a brief appearance at the end of Marvel Zombies 3 and fully appears in Marvel Zombies 4. Man-Thing and the Hood join the team later in the series.

=== Damnation ===
During the Damnation storyline, Wong and the ghost of Doctor Strange's dog Bats assemble Blade, Doctor Voodoo, Elsa Bloodstone, Ghost Rider, Moon Knight, Iron Fist, Scarlet Spider and Man-Thing to form the third incarnation of the Midnight Sons so that they can help Strange fight Mephisto's forces in Las Vegas.

=== Midnight Suns ===
Some time later, a new version of the team is brought together when Strange Academy student Zoe Laveau projects a vision to supernatural characters across the Marvel Universe. Featuring Blade, Kushala, Magik, Wolverine, and Nico Minoru, the series also includes appearances by characters such as Agatha Harkness, Clea Strange, and Doctor Doom.

=== Midnight Sons: Blood Hunt ===
The original Midnight Sons reunite to fight a large scale vampire invasion during the Blood Hunt event with the vampire invasion being led by Blade. They end up figuring out that Blade is possessed by Varnae.

== Crossovers ==
- Rise of the Midnight Sons (1992)
  - Ghost Rider (vol. 3) #28 (Part 1)
  - Ghost Rider/Blaze: Spirits of Vengeance #1 (Part 2)
  - Morbius: The Living Vampire #1 (Part 3)
  - Darkhold: Page from the Book of Sins #1 (Part 4)
  - Nightstalkers #1 (Part 5)
  - Ghost Rider (vol. 3) #31 (Part 6)
- Prelude to Midnight Massacre (1993)
  - Nightstalkers #7 (Part 1)
  - Morbius: The Living Vampire #10 (Part 2)
  - Nightstalkers #8 (Part 3)
  - Nightstalkers #9 (Part 4)
  - Morbius: The Living Vampire #11 (Part 5)
- Midnight Massacre (1993)
  - Nightstalkers #10 (Part 1)
  - Ghost Rider (vol. 3) #40 (Part 2)
  - Darkhold: Page from the Book of Sins #11 (Part 3)
  - Morbius: The Living Vampire #12 (Part 4)
  - Ghost Rider/Blaze: Spirits of Vengeance #13 (Part 5)
- Road To Vengeance: Missing Link (1993)
  - Ghost Rider (vol. 3) #41 (Part 1)
  - Ghost Rider/Blaze:Spirits of Vengeance #14 (Part 2)
  - Ghost Rider (vol. 3) #42 (Part 3)
  - Ghost Rider/Blaze: Spirits of Vengeance #15 (Part 4)
  - Ghost Rider (vol. 3) #43 (Part 5)
  - Ghost Rider/Blaze: Spirits of Vengeance #16 (Part 6)
- Siege of Darkness (1993)
  - Nightstalkers #14 (Part 1)
  - Ghost Rider (vol. 3) #44 (Part 2)
  - Marvel Comics Presents #143 (Part 3)
  - Darkhold: Page from the Book of Sins #15 (Part 4)
  - Morbius: The Living Vampire #16 (Part 5)
  - Marvel Comics Presents #144 (Part 6)
  - Doctor Strange, Sorcerer Supreme #60 (Part 7)
  - Ghost Rider/Blaze: Spirits of Vengeance #17 (Part 8)
  - Silver Sable and the Wild Pack #19 (optional)
  - Nightstalkers #15 (Part 9)
  - Ghost Rider (vol. 3) #45 (Part 10)
  - Marvel Comics Presents #145 (Part 11)
  - Darkhold: Page from the Book of Sins #16 (Part 12) - final issue of the series
  - Morbius: The Living Vampire #17 (Part 13)
  - Marvel Comics Presents #146 (Part 14)
  - Doctor Strange, Sorcerer Supreme #61 (Part 15)
  - Ghost Rider/Blaze: Spirits of Vengeance #18 (Part 16)
  - Midnight Sons Unlimited #4 (Part 17)
- Marvel Zombies 4 (2009)
  - Marvel Zombies 4 #1 (Part 1)
  - Marvel Zombies 4 #2 (Part 2)
  - Marvel Zombies 4 #3 (Part 3)
  - Marvel Zombies 4 #4 (Part 4)
- Damnation (2018)
  - Damnation #1 (Part 1)
  - Doctor Strange #386 (tie-in)
  - Damnation #2 (Part 2)
  - Doctor Strange #387 (tie-in)
  - Scarlet Spider #15 (tie-in)
  - Damnation #3 (Part 3)
  - Iron Fist #78 (tie-in)
  - Scarlet Spider #16 (tie-in)
  - Johnny Blaze: Ghost Rider #1 (tie-in)
  - Doctor Strange #388 (tie-in)
  - Iron Fist #79 (tie-in)
  - Iron Fist #80 (tie-in)
  - Scarlet Spider #17 (tie-in)
  - Damnation #4 (Part 4)
  - Doctor Strange #389 (epilogue)
- Midnight Suns (2022)
  - Midnight Suns #1 (Part 1)
  - Midnight Suns #2 (Part 2)
  - Midnight Suns #3 (Part 3)
  - Midnight Suns #4 (Part 4)
  - Midnight Suns #5 (Part 5)
- Blood Hunt (2024)
  - Midnight Sons: Blood Hunt #1 (Part 1)
  - Midnight Sons: Blood Hunt #2 (Part 2)
  - Midnight Sons: Blood Hunt #3 (Part 3)

== Collected editions ==
- Rise of the Midnight Sons (Ghost Rider (vol. 3) #28, 31; Spirits of Vengeance #1, Morbius: The Living Vampire #1, Darkhold #1, Nightstalkers #1)
- Marvel Zombies 4 (Marvel Zombies 4 #1-4)
- Doctor Strange: Damnation The Complete Collection (Damnation #1-4, Johnny Blaze: Ghost Rider #1, Doctor Strange #386-389, Iron Fist #78-80, Ben Reilly: Scarlet Spider #15-17)
- Midnight Suns (Midnight Suns #1-5)
- Midnight Sons: Blood Hunt (Midnight Sons: Blood Hunt #1-3, Werewolf By Night: Blood Hunt #1)

== In other media ==
- The Midnight Sons, renamed Midnight Suns, appear in Marvel's Midnight Suns. This version of the team has existed since the 17th century, with Ghost Riders as prominent members throughout the various iterations of the team and the Scarlet Witch as a former member. In the present, the Caretaker enlists the Hunter, Nico Minoru, Blade, Magik and Robbie Reyes to join forces with the Avengers and stop Lilith and Hydra.
- The Midnight Sons appear in Marvel Tokon: Fighting Souls, consisting of Ghost Rider (Robbie Reyes), Blade, Deadpool, and Loki. Despite being officially named the Midnight Sons in the Champion's fighting tournament, Deadpool renames the team to the Samurai Outriders.
