= Blood Hunt (comics) =

Comic book storyline

Publication information
- Publisher: Marvel Comics
- Format: Limited series
- Publication date: May 2024
- No. of issues: 5
- Main character: See below

Creative team
- Written by: Jed MacKay
- Penciller: Pepe Larraz
- Colorist: Marte Gracia

"Blood Hunt" is a 2024 American comic book crossover storyline written by Jed MacKay with art by Pepe Larraz and Marte Gracia, published by Marvel Comics. The storyline involves the rise of the Vampire Nation, which is united by a single vision for the first time in millennia.

Blood Hunt #1 was dedicated in memory of Paul Neary, with various other issues and tie-ins being dedicated in memory of Jeffrey Veregge, Don Perlin and Ray Chan.

== Publication history ==
Marvel Comics officially announced the "Blood Hunt" storyline on October 14, 2023 at the New York Comic Convention. It consisted of an eponymous, five-issue, central miniseries, written by then-current Avengers writer Jed MacKay, which would debut in May 2024, plus a series of tie-in one-shots and miniseries. The story centers upon a vampire apocalypse that threatens to consume the planet Earth, which is opposed by the Avengers, Blade, Bloodline, Spider-Man, Hunter's Moon, Tigra, Doctor Strange, and Clea. Also involved in the story in Morbius and Lizard, who despite typically serving as adversaries of Spider-Man, working toward a cure for the vampire plague.

== Plot ==
=== Lead-up ===
As Spider-Man fights a villain named Doctor Dark who has Darkforce abilities, he witnesses Doctor Dark suddenly vomit Darkforce energy, which rises into the sky. Meanwhile, Mister Fantastic and Invisible Woman notice numerous dimensional breaches, including a breach in the Darkforce dimension. In Hell's Kitchen, Manhattan, Daredevil senses the change caused by the Darkforce and springs into action against the attacking vampire forces, saving as many civilians as he can. In an alley, Blade's daughter Bloodline fights a group of vampires. She kills some of them until Dracula appears. He states that the world is ending and advises her to come with him to save it.

=== Main plot ===
The Darkforce dimension empties onto Earth, blocking out the Sun and allowing vampires to attack worldwide. As the Avengers are fighting off vampires, Blade contacts them and says he has information and to meet up at the Avengers' base, the Impossible City. The Avengers are ambushed by Bloodstorm One, Megrim, Cruel, Unusual, Damascene, and Smoke Eater, who manage to overwhelm them. Thor and Scarlet Witch are incapacitated, with Black Panther sacrificing himself to have the rest of the remaining Avengers evacuated. Blade tells Strange and Clea that the vampires have become organized under the Structure, which caused the Darkforce users to blot out the sun, the global uprising, and the Avengers being attacked by the Bloodcoven, a group of vampires who feed on superhuman blood. When Strange asks if Dracula is the leader of the Structure, Blade stabs Strange and states that he is the leader.

At the Impossible City, Thor and Scarlet Witch have been restrained while Black Panther has been turned into a vampire. As Bloodline and Dracula prepare to fight the Bloodcoven, they are greeted with the remaining Avengers (Captain Marvel, Captain America, Iron Man, and Vision). Vision overpowers the Bloodcoven with solar energy, forcing them to retreat. After arriving at the Sanctum Sanctorum, Dracula, Bloodline, and the Avengers meet with Strange, Hunter's Moon, Miles Morales, and Tigra. Bloodline expresses relief about meeting with Miles again, while telling him that she cannot find her father. Just as she says this, Miles suddenly turns into a vampire.

At the Sanctum Sanctorum, a vampiric Miles begins to attack only for Vision to subdue him and Doctor Strange's astral form and Clea to restore his mind to normal. Dracula informs Bloodline that Blade is the new lord of the vampires and that she must be the one to strike him down and stop him. When Bloodline runs off, Dracula and Miles Morales go after her. Tigra and Hunter's Moon state that the Midnight Mission will put together an army that cannot be killed or turned, but that they need one more to join their party. The Avengers plan to face off against Blade and the Bloodcoven, but realize they need to draw him out. Captain America broadcasts a speech worldwide, stating that they have fought worse opponents that tried to take over Earth before and won and that the world should tell the vampires that they cannot have it. After the broadcast, Captain America states to Iron Man that it was the same speech he gave to the Impossible City and hoped that Black Panther would recognize it. (Note: As seen in Avengers (vol. 9) #1.)

At the Temple of the First Blasphemy, Black Panther meets up with Blade and the Bloodcoven. When Black Panther asks if the man he is speaking with is actually Eric Brooks, it is revealed that Blade is possessed by Varnae. Back in Doomstadt, Doom informs Strange and Clea about Varnae and how Marie Laveau had failed to make Blade the host of Varnae the first time, (Note: As seen in Blade the Vampire Hunter #1.) but now has succeeded the second time around. Doom reveals that he has a plan to get rid of the Darkforce covering Earth in exchange for Strange giving up his title of Sorcerer Supreme. At the Temple of the First Blasphemy, the Varnae-possessed Blade tells Black Panther that he has the power of a god and the living Darkhold in his possession, which he needs to complete his ritual. Black Panther reveals to Varnae that the heart-shaped herb has been healing his vampiric infection bit by bit as he frees Thor. The rest of the Avengers show up as Varnae dares them to face the Unliving Darkforce.

Thor remembers the last time he fought Varnae (Note: As seen in Marvel Comics Presents #63.) as he fights him without Mjolnir, which is still in orbit. In Latveria, Doom and the Strange Academy students begin casting a spell to eliminate the Darkforce. Bloodline and Miles attack Blade, allowing Scarlet Witch to free him from Varnae's possession. Doctor Strange expects Doom to follow his oath of returning the Sorcerer Supreme mantle to him, but he refuses. While still a vampire, Miles finds himself unfazed by the sun. Dracula states that the sun has lost its effect on the vampires and that they have a new dawn ahead of them.

== Main characters by series ==
| Series | Characters |
|---|---|
Main series
| Blood Hunt | Black Panther; Blade; Bloodline; Bloodstorm One; Captain America (Wilson); Captain Marvel; Clea; Cruel; Damascene; Doctor Doom; Doctor Strange; Doyle Dormammu; Dracula; Germán Aguilar; Guslaug; Hunter's Moon; Impossible City; Iron Man; Moon Knight; Megrim; Scarlet Witch; Shaylee Moonpeddle; Smoke Eater; Spider-Man (Morales); Thor; Tigra; Toth; Unusual; Varnae; Vision; Zoe Laveau |
Ongoing series tie-ins
| Vengeance of the Moon Knight (vol. 2) | 8-Ball; Hunter's Moon; Khonshu; Moon Knight; Reese; Shroud; Soldier; Tigra; Wrecker |
| The Amazing Spider-Man (vol. 6) | Spider-Man (Parker); White Rabbit |
| The Avengers (vol. 9) | Baron Blood; Captain America (Rogers); Hazmat; Hawkeye (Bishop); Hercules; Quicksilver |
| Doctor Strange (vol. 6) | Clea; Doctor Strange; Wong; Victor Strange; Bats; Dog God |
| Venom (vol. 5) | Captive; Dylan Brock; Lee Price; Meridius; Venom |
| Fantastic Four (vol. 7) | Alicia Masters; Human Torch; Invisible Woman; Mister Fantastic; Thing |
| Miles Morales: Spider-Man (vol. 2) | Blade; Spider-Man (Morales); Bloodline; Hightail; R'ym'r; Dracula |
Limited series tie-ins
| Blood Hunters | Dagger; Doctor Doom; Elsa Bloodstone; Hallows' Eve; Hawkeye (Barton); Hawkeye (Bishop); Hellcow; Hulk; J. Jonah Jameson; Man-Wolf; Satana; Silver Surfer; White Widow |
| Dracula: Blood Hunt | Bloodline; Dracula; Varnae |
| Strange Academy: Blood Hunt | Darkhold; Doctor Doom; Doyle Dormammu; Germán Aguilar; Guslaug; Pia; Shaylee Moonpeddle; Toth; Zoe Laveau |
| The Amazing Spider-Man: Blood Hunt | Colleen Wing; Lizard; Spider-Man (Parker); Misty Knight; Morbius the Living Vampire |
| Union Jack the Ripper: Blood Hunt | Union Jack; Bulldog; Hunger |
| Black Panther: Blood Hunt | Black Panther; Enneads; Orishas; Varnae |
| Midnight Sons: Blood Hunt | Blade; Ghost-Rider (Blaze); Ghost Rider (Ketch); Victoria Montesi |
| Wolverine: Blood Hunt | Alyssa; Louise; Wolverine (Logan); Maverick |
One-shots
| Hulk: Blood Hunt (Note: Also called The Incredible Hulk: Blood Hunt.) | Hulk |
| Werewolf by Night: Blood Hunt | Werewolf by Night |
| X-Men: Blood Hunt – Jubilee | Jubilee |
| X-Men: Blood Hunt – Magik | Magik |
| X-Men: Blood Hunt – Psylocke | Greycrow; Psylocke |
| X-Men: Blood Hunt – Laura Kinney The Wolverine | Wolverine (Kinney); Scout |

== Issues involved ==
=== Prelude issues ===
| Title | Issues | Writer | Artist | Colorist | Release date |
|---|---|---|---|---|---|
| Free Comic Book Day 2024: Blood Hunt/X-Men | 1 | Jed MacKay | Sara Pichelli | TBA | May 4, 2024 |

=== Main series ===
| Title | Issues | Writer | Artist | Colorist | Debut date | Conclusion date |
|---|---|---|---|---|---|---|
| Blood Hunt | 1–5 | Jed MacKay | Pepe Larraz | Marte Gracia | May 1, 2024 | July 24, 2024 |

=== Tie-in issues ===
==== Limited series ====
| Title | Issues | Writer(s) | Artist(s) | Colorist | Debut date | Conclusion date |
|---|---|---|---|---|---|---|
| Blood Hunters | 1–4 | Mark Russell; Christos Gage; Erica Schultz | Bob Quinn; Javier Garrón; Bernard Chang | TBA | May 8, 2024 | July 17, 2024 |
| Dracula: Blood Hunt | 1–3 | Danny Lore | Vincenzo Carratù | TBA | May 8, 2024 | July 3, 2024 |
| Strange Academy: Blood Hunt | 1–3 | Daniel José Older | Luigi Zagaria | TBA | May 8, 2024 | July 24, 2024 |
| The Amazing Spider-Man: Blood Hunt | 1–3 | Justina Ireland | Marcelo Ferreira | TBA | May 15, 2024 | July 17, 2024 |
| Union Jack the Ripper: Blood Hunt | 1–3 | Cheryl Lynn Eaton | Farid Karami | TBA | May 15, 2024 | July 10, 2024 |
| Black Panther: Blood Hunt | 1–3 | Cavan Scott | Kev Walker | TBA | May 29, 2024 | July 3, 2024 |
| Midnight Sons: Blood Hunt | 1–3 | Bryan Hill | Germán Peralta | TBA | May 29, 2024 | July 24, 2024 |
| Wolverine: Blood Hunt | 1–4 | Tom Waltz | Juan José Ryp | TBA | June 5, 2024 | July 24, 2024 |

==== One-shots ====
| Title | Writer | Artist | Colorist | Release date |
|---|---|---|---|---|
| Hulk: Blood Hunt | Phillip Kennedy Johnson | Danny Earls | TBA | July 10, 2024 |
| Werewolf by Night: Blood Hunt | Jason Loo | Adam Gorham | TBA | July 3, 2024 |
| X-Men: Blood Hunt – Jubilee | Preeti Chhibber | Enid Balám | TBA | June 12, 2024 |
| X-Men: Blood Hunt – Magik | Ashley Allen | Jesús Hervás | TBA | June 26, 2024 |
| X-Men: Blood Hunt – Psylocke | Steve Foxe | Lynne Yoshii | TBA | July 3, 2024 |
| X-Men: Blood Hunt – Laura Kinney The Wolverine | Stephanie Phillips | Robert Gill | TBA | July 17, 2024 |

==== Series tie-ins ====
| Title | Issues | Writer(s) | Artist(s) | Colorist | Debut date | Conclusion date |
|---|---|---|---|---|---|---|
| Vengeance of the Moon Knight (vol. 2) | 5–7 | Jed MacKay | Alessandro Cappuccio | TBA | May 1, 2024 | July 24, 2024 |
| The Amazing Spider-Man (vol. 6) | 49 | Zeb Wells | John Romita Jr. | TBA | May 8, 2024 | |
| The Avengers (vol. 9) | 14–16 | Jed MacKay | C.F. Villa | TBA | May 8, 2024 | July 10, 2024 |
| Doctor Strange (vol. 6) | 15–17 | Jed MacKay | Pasqual Ferry | TBA | May 8, 2024 | July 3, 2024 |
| Venom (vol. 5) | 33–34 | Al Ewing | Juan Ferreyra | TBA | May 8, 2024 | June 5, 2024 |
| Fantastic Four (vol. 7) | 21–22 | Ryan North | Ivan Fiorelli | TBA | June 12, 2024 | July 24, 2024 |
| Miles Morales: Spider-Man (vol. 2) | 21–22 | Cody Ziglar | Travel Foreman | TBA | June 12, 2024 | July 3, 2024 |

=== Collected editions ===
| Title | Issues collected | Format | Writers | Artists | Pages | Released | ISBN |
Main series
| Blood Hunt | Blood Hunt #1-5 | TPB | Jed MacKay | Pepe Larraz, Sara Pichelli | 152 | 22 Oct 2024 | Pepe Larraz cover: 978-1302957377 |
| Blood Hunt: Red Band | Blood Hunt: Red Band #1-5 | OHC | Jed MacKay | Pepe Larraz, Sara Pichelli | 160 | 5 Aug 2025 | Pepe Larraz cover: 978-1302958534 |
Tie-ins
| Amazing Spider-Man: Blood Hunt | Amazing Spider-Man: Blood Hunt #1-3; Amazing Spider-Man (2022) #49; Miles Morales Spider-Man (2023) #21-22 | TPB | Justina Ireland, Zeb Wells, Cody Ziglar | Marcelo Ferreira, John Romita Jr, Travel Foreman | 144 | 5 Nov 2024 | Marcelo Ferreira cover: 978-1302958619 |
| Avengers by Jed Mackay Vol. 3: Blood Hunt | Avengers (2023) #12-16 | TPB | Jed Mackay | Francesco Mortarino, C.F. Villa | 120 | 3 Dec 2024 | Joshua Cassara cover: 978-1302958466 |
| Blood Hunt: Marvel Universe | Black Panther: Blood Hunt #1-3; Strange Academy: Blood Hunt #1-3, Hulk: Blood Hunt | TPB | Cheryl Lynn Eaton, Daniel José Older, Phillip Kennedy Johnson | Farid Karami, Luigi Zagaria, Danny Earls | 192 | 17 Dec 2024 | Andrea Sorrentino cover: 978-1302958633 |
| Blood Hunters: Once More Into Darkness | Blood Hunters (vol. 1) #1-4 | TPB | Mark Russell | Bob Quinn | 160 | 12 Nov 2024 | Greg Land cover: 978-1302958954 |
| Blood Hunters | Blood Hunters (vol. 2) #1-5 | TPB | Erica Schultz | Robert Gill | 120 | 24 Jun 2025 | Ema Lupacchino cover: 978-1302958923 |
| Doctor Strange by Jed Mackay Vol. 3: Blood Hunt | Doctor Strange (2023) #11-18 | TPB | Jed Mackay | Danilo S. Beyruth, Pasqual Ferry | 176 | 26 Nov 2024 | Alex Ross cover: 978-1302954802 |
| Dracula: Blood Hunt | Dracula: Blood Hunt #1-3; Union Jack The Ripper: Blood Hunt #1-3 | TPB | Danny Lore, Cavan Scott | Vincenzo Carratu, Kev Walker | 160 | 19 Nov 2024 | Rod Reis cover: 978-1302963477 |
| Midnight Sons: Blood Hunt | Midnight Sons: Blood Hunt #1-3; Werewolf by Night: Blood Hunt | TPB | Bryan Hill, Jason Loo | German Peralta, Adam Gorham | 112 | 26 Nov 2024 | Ken Lashley cover: 978-1302958626 |
| Miles Morales by Cody Ziglar Vol. 5: Blood Hunt | Miles Morales: Spider-Man (2022) #21-24; Miles Morales: Spider-Man Annual (2024) | TPB | Cody Ziglar, Curtis Baxter | Brent Peeples, David Baldeón, Travel Foreman | 144 | 18 Feb 2025 | Federico Vicentini cover: 978-1302958459 |
| X-Men: Blood Hunt | X-Men: Blood Hunt - Jubilee (2024); X-Men: Blood Hunt - Magik; X-Men: Blood Hunt - Psylocke; X-Men: Blood Hunt - Laura Kinney The Wolverine; Wolverine: Blood Hunt #1-4 | TPB | Preeti Chhibber, Ashley Allen, Steve Foxe, Stephanie Phillips, Tom Waltz | Enid Balam, Jesús Hervás, Lynne Yoshii, Robert Gill, Juan Jose Ryp | 184 | 24 Dec 2024 | Rod Reis cover: 978-1302958664 |

== Reception ==
Blood Hunt received generally positive reviews from critics. According to ComicBookRoundup, the core miniseries received an average score of 7.9 out of 10 across 49 different reviews.

== Aftermath ==
Six months after the events of Blood Hunt and seizing the mantle of the Sorcerer Supreme, Doctor Doom emerges from Latveria and declares himself Emperor of the World, leading into the events of One World Under Doom.
