= Caretaker (comics) =

Comics character

The Caretaker is a fictional character appearing in American comic books published by Marvel Comics. There have been two incarnations of the character.

The Caretaker appeared in the 2007 film Ghost Rider and the Hulu television series Helstrom, portrayed by Sam Elliott and Robert Wisdom respectively.

== Publication history ==
The first Caretaker debuted in Ghost Rider vol. 3 #28 (August 1992) and was created by Howard Mackie and Andy Kubert.

The second Caretaker debuted in Ghost Rider vol. 6 #26 and was created by Jason Aaron and Tan Eng Huat.

== Fictional character biography ==
=== Caretaker (original) ===
Caretaker is a member of The Blood, a mystical organization dedicated to fighting evil, with himself as the guardian of the family line associated with the ancient Medallion of Power. He watches over the Salem Fields Cemetery in Cypress Hills, Brooklyn, New York City. The cemetery has been the site of much magical evil, partly due to an ancient race of evil beings trapped beneath it.

After Lilith returns from a seeming death, mist spreads from the cemetery, causing death wherever it goes. A group of Midnight Sons associates gather, including Hannibal King, Victoria Montesi, and the two Ghost Riders (Johnny Blaze and Danny Ketch). They enter the cemetery in an attempt to save lives but are quickly overwhelmed. Caretaker declares he will take those involved with the 'Medallion of Power', Ghost Rider and Vengeance - away from the city. If the forces of Lilith get the Medallion as a whole, they would be unstoppable. The heroes resist leaving, even to the point of Blaze drawing his gun on Caretaker. This is enough to convince him, though he still believes the group is being foolish.

Zadkiel, a traitorous angel, seeks to overthrow God and claim Heaven for himself. To accomplish his goal, Zadkiel coerces Danny Ketch into battling Caretaker. Ketch confronts Caretaker alongside Blackout, who manages to kill Caretaker. Caretaker arrives in Heaven, but his soul is destroyed due to Zadkiel having taken over Heaven.

=== Sister Sara ===
Sara (last name unknown)

Publication information
- Publisher: Marvel Comics
- First appearance: Ghost Rider vol. 6 #26 (2008)

In-story information
- Alter ego: Sister Sara
- Team affiliations: The Sacred Heart Convent for the Sisters of the Holy Sepulcher
- Notable aliases: Caretaker
- Abilities: Teleportation

Sara is a nun and the granddaughter of the original Caretaker. Following her grandfather's death, Sara is instructed to enter the tunnels below his house and gain all the knowledge she can from his library. Danny Ketch attacks and destroys the tunnels, but Sara manages to absorb the knowledge contained in the library before it is destroyed.

Sara returns to her convent in Kansas to find that her fellow nuns have been killed by an unknown assailant. Mother Superior, head of the convent, explains what had happened in Sara's absence before dying. After Sara buries the bodies, she decided to avenge her fallen sisters and seek out their murderer – the Deacon.

Sara later encounters the Antichrist, who informs her that she is a living gateway to Heaven. Using Sara's power, the Antichrist leads an army of demons to attack Heaven. Sara confronts Deacon, but chooses not to kill him.

In the series Strange Academy, Sara becomes a teacher at the titular academy, where she teaches the history of ancient civilizations.

== Powers and abilities ==
The original Caretaker possesses superhuman strength and immunity to aging and disease.

The Sara incarnation of Caretaker can create portals and possesses an extensive knowledge of the occult.

== In other media ==
=== Television ===
The original Caretaker appears in Helstrom, portrayed by Robert Wisdom. This version is an African-American member of the Blood named Henry, who displays a more pleasant personality than his comics counterpart and is especially friendly towards Louise Hastings, the head of the Saint Teresa Center for Mental Health.

=== Film ===
The original Caretaker, amalgamated with Carter Slade, appears in Ghost Rider, portrayed by Sam Elliott.

=== Video games ===
- The original Caretaker appears in the Ghost Rider film tie-in game, voiced by Fred Tatasciore.
- The Sister Sara incarnation of the Caretaker appears in Marvel's Midnight Suns, voiced by Vanessa Marshall. This version is the immortal overseer of the Abbey, estranged sister of Lilith, and lover of Agatha Harkness who originally used magic to maintain her youth, but was forced to sacrifice the latter to create the Hunter's collar.
