= Lilith (Marvel Comics) =

Lilith is the name of two fictional characters appearing in American comic books published by Marvel Comics. The first version is the daughter of Dracula. The second version is a demon.

== Publication history ==
The first character named Lilith was the daughter of Dracula. Like her father, she is also a vampire, although her powers and weaknesses differ from most other vampires. She first appeared in Giant-Size Chillers Featuring The Curse of Dracula #1 (June 1974), and was created by Marv Wolfman and Gene Colan. Most of her solo appearances were written by Steve Gerber, who would later use a supporting character he created for these stories, Martin Gold, in the two-issue miniseries The Legion of Night. The character subsequently appeared in Vampire Tales #6 (August 1974), The Tomb of Dracula #23 (August 1974), 25 (October 1974) and 28 (January 1975), Dracula Lives! #10-11 (January–March 1975), Marvel Preview #12 (September 1977), The Tomb of Dracula #60 (September 1977), Marvel Preview #16 (June 1978), The Tomb of Dracula #66-67 (September–November 1978), The Tomb of Dracula (vol. 2) #5-6 (June–August 1980) and The Uncanny X-Men Annual #6 (1982). Her apparent "death" occurred in Doctor Strange (vol. 2) #62 (December 1983). She made a posthumous appearance in Doctor Strange, Sorcerer Supreme #9 (November 1989). Lilith returned years later in Ghost Rider (vol. 3) #82-85 (February–May 1997), Spider-Man Unlimited (vol. 2) #20 (May 1998), Dracula: Lord of the Undead #1-3 (December 1998), Witches #2 (August 2004), Nick Fury's Howling Commandos #2-6 (January–May 2006), and Legion of Monsters: Morbius #1 (September 2007). Lilith received an entry in The Official Handbook of the Marvel Universe Deluxe Edition #18 and in The Official Handbook of the Marvel Universe: Horror 2005.

The second character named Lilith is a demon sorceress who is known as the "Mother of All Demons". She first appeared in Ghost Rider (vol. 3) #28 (August 1992).

== Fictional character biography ==
=== Dracula's daughter ===
Lilith

Publication information
- Publisher: Marvel Comics
- First appearance: Giant-Size Chillers Featuring The Curse of Dracula #1 (June 1974)
- Created by: Marv Wolfman; Gene Colan

In-story information
- Alter ego: Lilith Dracula
- Species: Vampire
- Team affiliations: S.H.I.E.L.D. S.H.I.E.L.D.'s Paranormal Containment Unit
- Notable aliases: Angel O'Hara, Lilith Drake, Lily Drake
- Abilities: Although a vampire, Lilith is immune to sunlight, is not repelled by holy symbols, does not need to sleep in a coffin lined with her native soil and is not completely dependent on drinking blood. She is unable to personally kill Dracula herself and will continue to exist as his eternal nemesis until he is permanently destroyed.

Lilith is Dracula's oldest child and is his only child by his first wife, Zofia, who was forced on Dracula by his father through an arranged marriage. After Dracula's father died, he renounced Zofia and forced her and their infant daughter to leave Castle Dracula so that he could marry his second wife, Maria, the woman he truly loved. Lilith was raised by Gypsies to whom she had been entrusted after her mother's suicide. Lilith's foster-mother was the Gypsy elder Gretchin. When Lilith was a young girl, Dracula, now a vampire thanks to the Gypsy woman Leandra, attacked and murdered many Gypsies, including Gretchin's son Arni, enraging her into seeking revenge. She cast a spell upon Lilith to make her into a vampire, but one with rather different powers: unlike conventional vampires, she does not require blood to survive, does not fear holy symbols, cannot be killed by sunlight, and does not need to sleep in a coffin lined with her native soil. As part of the curse, she would haunt Dracula, ever opposing him, until Dracula was finally, irrevocably destroyed. Whenever she was "killed", she would be reborn by her spirit taking over the body of an innocent woman who wanted her father dead; this included the ability to shift forms and clothing between Lilith's own form and that of her "hostess".

Lilith normally appears as a tall, beautiful woman with long black hair and a family resemblance to Dracula, dressed in a red and black skin-tight costume and cape with a bat-like ornament in her hair. As a vampire, she could change into a wolf, a bat, or mist (the latter either wholly or partially), and had limited control over weather, as well as the ability to command bats, wolves, dogs, rats and mice.

In the modern era, Lilith's spirit possessed a woman named Angel O'Hara, who had come to hate her father and want him dead when he accidentally killed her husband, Ted Hannigan, after finding out that she had married him secretly and was carrying his child. Lilith killed Angel's father, but allowed her to live her life when Lilith was not using their shared body. Angel was eventually physically separated from Lilith by Viktor Benzel, a distant descendant of Gretchin and the heir, along with his brother Karl, to much of her occult knowledge; Viktor used this knowledge to create separate bodies for Angel and Lilith.

At one point, Lilith and Dracula agreed to avoid each other, but the agreement broke down. When Dracula was stripped of his vampiric powers toward the end of the 70-issue series The Tomb of Dracula, he asked Lilith to bite him and restore his powers, only to be refused. In issue #5 of The Tomb of Dracula magazine that soon followed, Lilith and Dracula fought once more and Dracula revealed to Lilith that the curse that made her his eternal nemesis also prevented her from being able to actually kill him. Lilith was destroyed, along with her father and the rest of Earth's vampires, when Doctor Strange used the Darkhold's Montesi Formula to eliminate vampirism and all vampires from the world. The Montesi Formula eventually weakened and both Lilith and her father returned to life.

==== Reception ====
Lilith, the daughter of Dracula, was ranked #24 on a listing of Marvel Comics' monster characters in 2015.

In 2021, Screen Rant included Lilith in their "Marvel: 10 Most Powerful Vampires" list.

In 2022, CBR.com ranked Lilith Drake 6th in their "10 Most Important Marvel Vampires" list.

=== The Mother of All Demons ===
Lilith
- Demon Lilith, art by Mike Deodato

Publication information
- Publisher: Marvel Comics
- First appearance: Ghost Rider (vol. 3) #28 (August 1992)
- Created by: Howard Mackie; Andy Kubert

In-story information
- Species: Demon
- Notable aliases: Bat Zuge, Kiskillilla, Mother of the Lilin
- Abilities: Superhuman strength, stamina and durability Divinity; Vast magic manipulation Ability to summon demons Super fecundity Phagogenesis; Conversion

The demon Lilith is an ancient demon goddess and sorceress. She gives birth to demons called the Lilin which have lives of their own, but always remain obedient to their mother.

Lilith is an immortal who had lived in the city of pre-Cataclysm Atlantis, one of its few survivors. Over the centuries, she gave birth to many of her children, the Lilin, including Creed, Pilgrim, Fang, Doc, Meatmarket, Skinner, and Nakota. Trapped in the leviathan Tiamat by Atlantean sorcerers, she used her vast magics to influence outside affairs. While thus imprisoned, she encountered Danny Ketch's spirit, and then appeared in a vision to Blackout.

Lilith was finally released from her ancient imprisonment by two unknowing scientist explorers. Discovering that her Lilin children had been scattered across the dimensions centuries ago and that many of them were destroyed by the Ghost Rider and Johnny Blaze, she soon made enemies of them. She recruited the Lilin and Blackout, and sent Blackout, Creed, and Pilgrim to abduct Johnny Blaze's son, Craig Blaze.

After many attempts to kill the two, her enemies list grew to include Doctor Strange, Morbius the Living Vampire, the Witches, the Nightstalkers and the Midnight Sons. In her first attempt, she and most of her children were killed. Many months later, her children were reborn with the assistance of Meatmarket, a child that Lilith did not expect would help her. This time, they are allied with Centurious the Soulless Man. Their goal was to claim the mystical artifact called the Medallion of Power, and kill its inheritors, Johnny Blaze, Danny Ketch, and Vengeance. Lilith and her offspring betrayed Centurious and allied with his most hated enemy, Zarathos. However, the Midnight Sons banished Lilith and her offspring to the Shadowside. Zarathos was later turned into stone and killed. Lilith returned to the stony Zarathos, saying she abandoned her old offspring and replaced it with his offspring, promising vengeance for the both of them.

Lilith was one of several demonic beings imprisoned within Avalon at the start of the Secret Invasion, but was then freed by Pete Wisdom during Captain Britain and MI3's battle with the Skrulls. Lilith subsequently joins Satannish and the other freed creatures in killing the invading Skrulls, after hearing them state that any magical creatures that do not serve the Skrulls will not be tolerated.

==== Powers and abilities ====
Lilith is widely described as one of the most magically skilled demons in the Marvel Universe; regarded as both a sorceress and a goddess. She is able to manipulate eldritch energy for several effects; to strike her opponents and even obliterate them when she exerts her full power on lesser creatures, conjure protective shields capable of protecting vampires from sunlight, fashion new Lilin either from nothingness or by converting other creatures, and to teleport herself or summon others. She is far more powerful and resilient than any of her children, making her a considerable challenge for the likes of the Ghost Rider. Additionally, she is able to summon her demon children to Earth and the more demons she "births", the more her physical strength increases. Through her genesis-based attributes Lilith can literally give birth to countless races beyond those of the demonic Lilin; ranging from humans to mutants and mystical beasts, etc. She can just as easily revitalize any of her fallen brood through the act of rebirthing after they die. She does so either through natural copulative procreation, consuming prior offspring, conjuring them out of nothingness, conversion of other species or through asexual reproduction. Her power also enables her to transmigrate living souls consumed into new entities, respawning them as any given species she desires at a later date in time. She can even rebirth herself, as her prior forms often burn out over the course of time, into a younger, stronger body than the last.

== In other media ==
- The second incarnation of Lilith appears as a boss in Ghost Rider, voiced by Carolyn Hennesy.
- The second incarnation of Lilith makes a cameo appearance in Morrigan's ending in Ultimate Marvel vs. Capcom 3.
- The second incarnation of Lilith appears in Marvel's Midnight Suns, voiced by Jennifer Hale. This version is a powerful sorceress who previously worked with her sister, the Caretaker, to defeat Hiram Shaw. When Lilith tried to use the Darkhold to cure her infant child of a deadly disease, Caretaker took both from her. In response, Lilith struck a deal with the Darkhold's creator Chthon to serve him in exchange for sparing her child. Chthon agreed and transformed her into the horned "Mother of Demons". She was eventually placed into eternal slumber until Hydra awakens her in the present in a bid for world domination.
