= Toth =

Toth may refer to:

- Tóth or Toth, a Hungarian surname
- Toth alias Soky, a Hungarian noble family
- Toth Brand Imaging, or Toth + Co, an advertising agency and design firm
- Toth equation, related to the Langmuir adsorption model
- Toth Nunataks, in Antarctica
- Toth, a Marvel Comics character and member of Strange Academy

== See also ==
- Thoth (disambiguation)
- Tooth (disambiguation)
- Na'Toth, a fictional character in Babylon 5
