= Damnation (comics) =

2018 Marvel Comics limited series

- Variant cover to Damnation #1; Art by Ron Lim
- Publisher: Marvel Comics
- Publication date: February 2018
Title(s)
Doctor Strange: Damnation #1-4
Doctor Strange #386-390
Scarlet Spider #15-17
Iron Fist #78-80
Damnation: Johnny Blaze - Ghost Rider #1
- Main character(s): Doctor Strange; Midnight Sons; Scarlet Spider; Mephisto

Creative team
- Writer(s): Donny Cates; Nick Spencer
- Artist: Rod Reis
- Letterer: Travis Lanham
- Colorist: Rod Reis
- Editor: Nick Lowe

Damnation is a comic book limited series written by Donny Cates and Nick Spencer, illustrated by Rod Reis, and published in 2018 as four monthly issues by Marvel Comics. It was the main story in a crossover event with some plot elements occurring in tie-in issues of related ongoing series also published by Marvel.

== Publication history ==
Damnation builds on events depicted in the 2017 crossover Secret Empire by Nick Spencer and various artists and the Doctor Strange ongoing series written by Donny Cates. The series was announced as a five-issue limited series on November 16, 2017, but later details reduced the count to four. The first issue was released February 21, 2018.

The crossover plot includes tie-in issues from some of Marvel's other contemporary ongoing series. These include Ben Reilly: Scarlet Spider #15–17, Doctor Strange #386–389, Iron Fist #78–80, and Johnny Blaze: Ghost Rider #1.

Damnation is Cates' last story with Doctor Strange. When the limited series concluded, he left the monthly title, later going on to write his run of Venom from 2018 to 2021.

== Plot ==
=== Main plot ===
In the 2017 crossover event Secret Empire, Las Vegas was destroyed when Hydra Helicarriers were dispatched to raze the city. After reclaiming his Sorcerer Supreme status from Loki, Doctor Strange uses his magic to restore it and resurrect the people who died. He is opposed by Mephisto, the ruler of Hell who has already claimed their souls as his own. He orchestrates events that causes his demons to bring Strange to his recently created Hotel Inferno. Mephisto claims that the remnants of Las Vegas were in his realm before it was restored. Hotel Inferno starts to have an effect on the people of Las Vegas. It also affects Black Panther, Captain Marvel, Falcon, Hawkeye, and Jane Foster, who are all turned into Ghost Rider-like creatures. The ghost of Strange's talking dog Bats seeks out Wong so that he can help Strange. To help Strange, Wong summons Blade, Doctor Voodoo, Moon Knight, Elsa Bloodstone, Ghost Rider, Iron Fist, Scarlet Spider, and Man-Thing to form the latest incarnation of the Midnight Sons.

Mephisto has turned Doctor Strange into a Ghost Rider-like creature. While Wong has assembled the Midnight Sons, they were overpowered by the demons roaming around Las Vegas. This attack gets Wong and Bats separated from the rest. While the Midnight Sons were saved from the Ghost Riders by Scarlet Spider, Wong and Bats encounter Strange's Ghost Rider form.

Bats possesses the soulless body of Doctor Strange. While the Midnight Sons and Scarlet Spider fight the demons, Ghost Rider rides his motorcycle to the top of Hotel Inferno to confront Mephisto. After Mephisto removes the Ghost Rider from Johnny Blaze, he throws Blaze from the roof.

The Midnight Sons have been fighting the possessed Avengers for hours. The possessed Avengers attack Mephisto as Wong reveals that Mephisto rendering his throne vacant has enabled Ghost Rider to become the new ruler of Mephisto's realm. After Doctor Strange returns from the Realm Between, he assists the Midnight Sons and the Avengers into preventing Mephisto from returning to his realm to reclaim his throne. Though Strange defeats him, Mephisto flees back to his realm, where he is defeated by Johnny Blaze and several Ghost Riders from across the multiverse. Johnny Blaze sends Mephisto back to Earth, where he is kept at the top of Hotel Inferno in countless restraints as Hotel Inferno remains on Earth. Wong remains behind to keep an eye on Hotel Inferno's casino.

=== Tie-ins ===
==== Doctor Strange ====
As Hotel Inferno starts to affect the people of Las Vegas, Doctor Strange confronts Mephisto in a game of blackjack. The deal is that Mephisto had to return the souls to Las Vegas if Strange won and that Strange's soul would be claimed if Mephisto won. Though Strange wins by cheating, Mephisto finds out and has Strange tortured. After being tortured, Strange is rescued by Scarlet Witch, Clea and Loki and jump into action when they see the Avengers fighting demons. It is later revealed that the rescue was all an illusion and that Clea was a possessed Captain Marvel, who posed as her to trick Strange. Meanwhile, Bats and Strange's mind find themselves in the Realm Between, where they find the souls of those that Mephisto has trapped while he controls their bodies. It is here where Strange finds the souls of the Avengers that Mephisto is controlling as well as Dormammu. With the souls of the Avengers, Strange's soul plans to find a way out of the Realm Between. Strange then manages to find a way to escape the Realm Between and helps the souls of the Avengers return to their bodies.

==== Ben Reilly: The Scarlet Spider ====
During the rise of Hotel Inferno, Ben Reilly sees the effect that the hotel has caused on the citizens of Las Vegas and springs into action. While fighting demons alongside the Midnight Sons, Ben is separated from the group and faces Mephisto, who tries to trick him into giving up his path to redemption. When Ben refuses, he sends a possessed Kaine Parker after him. After a long fight, Ben manages to free Kaine from his possession and convinces him to help defeat Mephisto.

==== Iron Fist ====
After being separated from the Midnight Sons, Iron Fist is found by Fat Cobra, who takes him to a fight tournament where the star fighter is Orson Randall, a former Iron Fist who died some time ago. After discovering what forces him to fight, Danny decides to help Randall escape by fighting in the tournament. During this time, the demon fight promoter brings in Danny's long-lost sister Miranda Rand-Kai, who is sent to fight Randall, as well as Fat Cobra's deceased mother. After fighting twelve monster demons, Danny and his friends are able to escape, though Randall dies during the fight. After sending Miranda, Fat Cobra, and his mother to his place, Danny heads out to rejoin the Midnight Sons to defeat Mephisto.

==== Johnny Blaze: Ghost Rider ====
Johnny Blaze dies after being thrown off a roof. This was all part of Wong's plan. In Hell, Blaze finds the now-independent Spirit of Vengeance and persuades him to help reach Mephisto's throne. Blaze and the spirit reunite and make their way through the circles of Hell until they reach Mephisto's throne. After fighting through demons, Blaze manages to claim the throne and becomes the new King of Hell.

== Reception ==
The series debuted to a mixed critical reception. The first issue received an average score of 6.9 out of 10 according to review aggregator Comic Book Roundup. Because the central premise is based on an event that occurred a year earlier, Comicbook.com found the plot immediately felt dated. Although Jesse Shedeen felt the issue was too much setup and too little story, he said it captured the charm of the Cates' monthly Doctor Strange series. His review for IGN concludes that the plot may have worked better if dealt with exclusively within Doctor Strange instead of in a crossover. Bleeding Cool was less impressed, calling it a "shocking misfire from the top-downwards" that makes the reader hate Doctor Strange. The second issue was received more favorably by Pierce Lydon, who called it "fairly delightful" in a review for Newsarama. David Brooke praised the artwork in his review for Adventures in Poor Taste.

However, the entire event received mixed reviews from critics. According to Comicbook Roundup, Doctor Strange Damnation received an average rating of 6.9 out of 10 based on 419 reviews.

== Collected editions ==
Title	Material collected	Published date	ISBN
Doctor Strange: Damnation - The Complete Collection	Doctor Strange: Damnation #1-4, Johnny Blaze: Ghost Rider #1, Doctor Strange #386-389, Iron Fist #78-80, Ben Reilly: Scarlet Spider #15-17	July 2018	978-1302912604
Doctor Strange: Damnation	Doctor Strange: Damnation #1-4	October 2018	978-1302913922
Ben Reilly: Scarlet Spider Vol. 4: Damnation	Ben Reilly: Scarlet Spider #15-20	October 2018	978-1302911164
Doctor Strange by Donny Cates	Doctor Strange: Damnation #1-4 and Doctor Strange #381-390,	April 2019	978-1302915292
