= Tăutești =

Tăuteşti may refer to:

- Tăuteşti, a village in Ungureni Commune, Botoşani County, Romania
- Tăuteşti, a village in Rediu Commune, Iaşi County, Romania
- Tăuteşti, a village in Zamostea Commune, Suceava County, Romania

== See also ==
- Tăuţi (disambiguation)
- Tóth (disambiguation)
