= Tăuți =

Tăuţi (meaning "Slovaks") may refer to:

- Tăuţi, a village in Meteș Commune, Alba County, Romania
- Tăuţi, a village in Floreşti Commune, Cluj County, Romania

== See also ==
- Tăuteşti (disambiguation)
- Tóth (disambiguation)
