= Sanctum Sanctorum (Marvel Comics) =

Fictional building used by the comic book character Doctor Strange

- Sanctum Sanctorum; Art by Steve Ditko
- First appearance: Strange Tales #110 (July 1963)
- Created by: Stan Lee; Steve Ditko

In-universe information
- Type: Residence
- Location: United States, New York City
- Character: Doctor Strange
- Publisher: Marvel Comics

The Sanctum Sanctorum is a fictional building appearing in American comic books published by Marvel Comics, as the residence and headquarters of Doctor Strange. Created by Stan Lee and Steve Ditko, the building first appeared in Strange Tales #110 (July 1963). It is located at the address 177A Bleecker Street in the Greenwich Village neighborhood of New York City. This is a reference to the address of an apartment once shared by writers Roy Thomas and Gary Friedrich.

The Sanctum Sanctorum has appeared in various media adaptations, including animated television series, video games, and in numerous media within the Marvel Cinematic Universe.

== Publication history ==
The Sanctum Sanctorum first appeared with Doctor Strange in his debut in Strange Tales #110 (July 1963), drawn by Steve Ditko. The details of the building have varied by artist, with one reviewer noting, for example, of Marvel Premiere #3 (July 1972) that "[n]ot since the heady days of Ditko for instance, did the doctor's sanctum sanctorum appear in such scrumptious detail, laden it seemed, with the heavy odor of burning incense". In a comical turn in Strange Tales #147, a building inspector informs Strange that he has six months to get the Sanctum Sanctorum repainted and make other repairs, or the building will be condemned. It has been described as "an integral part of the Doctor Strange mythos".

The 2011 comic Marvel Vault: Doctor Strange depicts the first night that Strange spent in the Sanctum Sanctorum.

== Characterization ==
=== Location ===
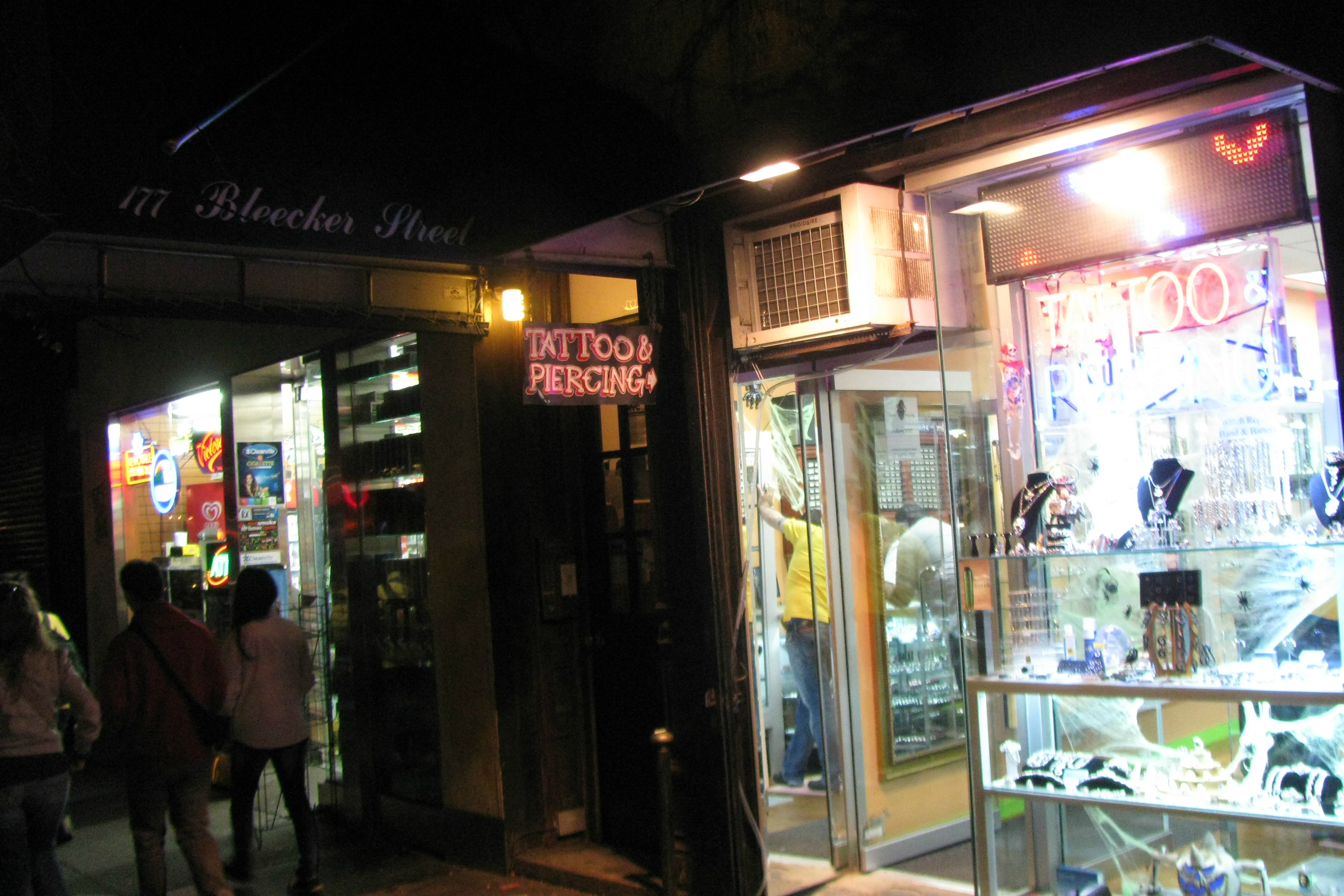
177 Bleecker Street, New York City in 2013.

The Sanctum Sanctorum is a three-story townhouse located at 177A Bleecker Street. It is "in the heart of New York City's Greenwich Village." Contrary to fan theories that this address was meant to invoke 221B Baker Street, the fictional domicile of Sherlock Holmes, it was actually a reference to the address of an apartment shared in the 1960s by Roy Thomas and Gary Friedrich. In the comics, the building was said to have been built upon a site where pagan sacrifices were performed, and Native American rituals before that, and serves as a focal point of supernatural energies. It was noted that as of 2016, the location could be found on Google Maps.

=== Architecture ===
The building's depiction has varied over the years, but some elements remain consistent. "The outside looks like a townhouse, while past a veil of magical force on the inside are various rooms with various mystical artifacts", as one source put it. The building seems to have more space in its interior than its outside would suggest. Some corridors become labyrinths, and the layout and arrangement of some rooms appears to shift on their own. The house holds many powerful magical items, some of which have an innocent appearance. Some are dangerous, such as a radio which is fatal to the touch. The basement contains storage, a furnace, and the laundry. The first floor contains living rooms, dining rooms, and the general library. The second floor holds living quarters for Strange, Wong, and any guests they may have. The Sanctum Sanctorum is specifically the third floor of the building, home to Strange's meditation room and occult library, where he keeps the Book of the Vishanti, and his repository of ancient artifacts and objects of magical power, such as the Orb of Agamotto.

The Sanctum consistently has a circular skylight with four swooping lines; this design has stayed with the building despite the window's destruction on many occasions. The design of the window is the Seal of the Vishanti, which protects the Sanctum from most supernatural invaders. It is also called the "Window of the Worlds," or the Anomaly Rue. Certain members of the New Avengers appear to acknowledge this. Chemistro, a super-villain member of the Hood's army, though possessing no such power to directly break that of the Vishanti's, was able to change the chemical composition of the wood that held the seal to break it. In one story Baron Mordo was able to transport the house to another dimension. The artistic directors of the Marvel Cinematic Universe film adaptation described it as a "turn-of-the-century empire—timeless, really—mixture of classical and neoclassical American architecture".

=== Residents ===
Its main residents, apart from Strange, have been his lover/apprentice Clea, his manservant Wong, and the apprentice sorcerer Rintrah.

The Sanctum Sanctorum became the headquarters of the New Avengers for a time, having been magically disguised as an abandoned building designated as a future Starbucks cafe. The run-down disguise extends to the interior of the building as needed, undetectable by even the Extremis armor of Iron Man.

The building has also served as headquarters of the Defenders.

=== Defenses ===
After constructing the house, Doctor Strange cast a permanent, intricate spell of mystical force to protect it. Despite this, it was seemingly destroyed in a siege by mystical forces, during the Midnight Sons storyline, while various heroes such as the Nightstalkers, Ghost Rider, and Johnny Blaze were hiding inside.

During the World War Hulk storyline, the Sanctum was invaded by the forces of the alien Warbound, its defensive enchantments and illusions shattered by Hiroim.

After the use of unacceptable dark magics in the fight against the Hulk, the Sanctum is invaded by the Hood's army, who are ultimately defeated amid much damage to the building. Doctor Strange is forced to retreat when the battle allows the government-sanctioned Mighty Avengers to take over the Sanctum. Brother Voodoo is called in to neutralize the remnants of the defensive magics.

On one occasion, Doctor Strange destroyed the defenses of the Sanctum to avoid their exploitation by a foe.

== Reception ==
=== Accolades ===
- In 2019, CBR.com ranked the Sanctum Sanctorum 4th in their "10 Most Iconic Superhero Hideouts In Marvel Comics" list.
- In 2020, CBR.com ranked the Sanctum Sanctorum 9th in their "Avengers 10 Best Headquarters" list.

== Other versions ==
=== Marvel Zombies ===
The Sanctum Sanctorum appears in Marvel Zombies vs. The Army of Darkness #3.

=== Ultimate Marvel ===
The Sanctum Sanctorum of Earth-1610 appears in Ultimatum.

== In other media ==
=== Television ===
- The Sanctum Sanctorum appears in The Super Hero Squad Show.
- The Sanctum Sanctorum appears in Ultimate Spider-Man.
- The Sanctum Sanctorum appears in Avengers Assemble.
- The Sanctum Sanctorum appears in the Hulk and the Agents of S.M.A.S.H. episode "Stranger in a Strange Land."

=== Film ===
- The Sanctum Sanctorum appears in Dr. Strange.
- The Sanctum Sanctorum appears in Doctor Strange: The Sorcerer Supreme.
- The Sanctum Sanctorum appears in Hulk: Where Monsters Dwell.

=== Marvel Cinematic Universe ===
The New York Sanctum appears in the Marvel Cinematic Universe films Doctor Strange (2016), Thor: Ragnarok (2017), Avengers: Infinity War (2018), Avengers: Endgame (2019), Spider-Man: No Way Home (2021), Doctor Strange in the Multiverse of Madness (2022), and in the Disney+ series What If...? (2021) episode "What If... Zombies?".

=== Video games ===
- The Sanctum Sanctorum appears in Marvel: Ultimate Alliance.
- The Sanctum Sanctorum appears as a landmark in The Incredible Hulk.
- The Sanctum Sanctorum appears as a landmark in Ultimate Spider-Man.
- The Sanctum Sanctorum appears in Lego Marvel Super Heroes and Lego Marvel Super Heroes 2.
- The Sanctum Sanctorum appears as a landmark in Marvel's Spider-Man, Spider-Man: Miles Morales, and Marvel's Spider-Man 2.
- The Sanctum Sanctorum appears in Marvel Snap.
- The Sanctum Sanctorum appears in Marvel's Midnight Suns.
- The Sanctum Sanctorum appears in Marvel Rivals.

=== Miscellaneous ===
The Sanctum Sanctorum appears in "The Sanctum Sanctorum Showdown" and "Spider-Man at the Sanctum Workshop" Lego sets.
