= Victoria Montesi =

Publication information
- Publisher: Marvel Comics
- First appearance: The Darkhold #1 (October 1992)
- Created by: Christian Cooper (writer and editor)

In-story information
- Team affiliations: Darkholders
- Abilities: Magic of the Darkhold

Victoria Montesi is a fictional character appearing in American comic books published by Marvel Comics. Created by writer/editor Christian Cooper, she first appeared in Darkhold: Pages from the Book of Sins #1 (October 1992), and is notable for being the first openly lesbian lead character to appear in Marvel Comics.

== Publication history ==
Victoria Montesi first appeared in Darkhold: Pages from the Book of Sins #1 (October 1992). Created by writer and editor Christian Cooper, she was the first openly lesbian lead character to appear in Marvel Comics.

== Fictional character biography ==
Montesi is the only child of Monsignor Vittorio Montesi; the Montesi line was long ago designated as the guardians of the Darkhold, a tome of ancient black magic which has the potential to summon the Elder God Chthon to wreak havoc upon the Earth. Victoria disbelieves her father's claims and takes up hospital work in Rome, where she lives with her lover, karate instructor Natasha "Nash" Salvato. When pages from the Darkhold are distributed to unsuspecting mortals, Victoria joins with occult expert Louise Hastings and Interpol agent Sam Buchanan to recover the pages.

These alliances draw them into many adventures unrelated to the hunt for Darkhold pages. Victoria and Sam become involved in Lilith's rebirth in Cypress Hills, Brooklyn, which summons a variety of demonic creatures. Sam, Victoria, Ghost Rider, Caretaker, the Nightstalkers, and other heroes try to their best to stop it but end up on the run and under siege.

Victoria is revealed to be Chthon's daughter, created when the sterile Vittorio used magic to guarantee himself an heir. Victoria is mystically impregnated with Chthon himself; Doctor Strange keeps Victoria in mystic stasis for a time to delay Chthon's rebirth into the Earth dimension, and he was ultimately able to prevent it.

== Powers and abilities ==
Victoria Montesi can sense when someone has accessed a page from the Darkhold tome. Originally thought to be due to her Montesi family bloodline, Victoria's powers were actually due to her creation through the magic of the Darkhold by her sterile father, Vittorio Montesi. She is also a trained doctor and has limited martial arts training taught to her by her lover, Nash Salvato, and later by her teammate, Sam Buchanan.
