= Elsa Bloodstone =

Marvel Comics fictional character

- Elsa in Nextwave. Art by Nextwave: Agents of H.A.T.E..

Publication information
- Publisher: Marvel Comics
- First appearance: Bloodstone #1 (December 2001); Earth-616 version: Nextwave: Agents of H.A.T.E. #1 (March 2006)
- Created by: Warren Ellis (writer); Stuart Immonen (artist); Character concept: Dan Abnett (writer); Andy Lanning (writer); Michael Lopez (artist)

In-story information
- Full name: Elsa Bloodstone
- Species: Human (empowered)
- Team affiliations: Midnight Sons; Avengers; Nextwave; Fearless Defenders; Doom's Avengers
- Abilities: Superhuman strength, speed, durability, and endurance; Regenerative healing factor; Immunity to vampire bites; Expert marksman; Use of mystical items

Elsa Bloodstone is a character appearing in American comic books published by Marvel Comics. Created by Dan Abnett and Andy Lanning, and Michael Lopez, the character first appeared in Bloodstone #1 (December 2001) as a blonde teenage parody of Buffy the Vampire Slayer, before being redesigned and rebooted by artist Stuart Immonen as a late-20s redheaded monster Hunter in Warren Ellis' Nextwave: Agents of H.A.T.E. #1 (March 2006). Elsa Bloodstone is the daughter of the previously established Marvel Universe character Ulysses Bloodstone and the sister of Cullen Bloodstone. She has been a member of Nextwave, Midnight Sons, and Fearless Defenders.

Elsa Bloodstone appeared in the Marvel Cinematic Universe / Disney+ television special Werewolf by Night, portrayed by Laura Donnelly. She appears as a playable character in the video game Marvel Rivals.

== Publication history ==
A character named Elsa appeared as the lead character in the Bloodstone mini-series (December 2001–March 2002) by writer duo Dan Abnett, Andy Lanning and artist Michael Lopez, introduced as the blonde teenaged daughter of Ulysses Bloodstone, who learns of her father being a monster hunter.

The character concept was rebooted as a team member of the twelve-issue Nextwave: Agents of H.A.T.E. maxi-series, written by Warren Ellis and illustrated by Stuart Immonen, which ran from 2006 to 2007, which rendered the 2001 Elsa non-canon. At first presented as a counter-terrorist group made up of superheroes and former superheroes, the team later discovers their employers are funded by a terrorist organization. During the book's development, Immonen revised his initial character design for Elsa after editor Nick Lowe felt it was too severe, arriving at a look the artist described as more "glamazon-y." Originally depicted as an alternate continuity series, the All-New, All-Different Marvel refresh of their main line of comics made it part of the main continuity, with the series redheaded late-20s Elsa Bloodstone supplanting the blonde teenaged Elsa Bloodstone from 2001's Bloodstone, now officially non-canon.

Elsa and her family featured in the four issue mini Legion of Monsters, that was collected in Bloodstone and the Legion of Monsters. In 2012, she appeared in Wolverine's ongoing and Avengers Arena which introduced her long lost brother Cullen Bloodstone, who was trapped in an alternate dimension by their father.

In Aug. 2013, Elsa joined a team of superheroes known as the Fearless Defenders. At the time of her joining, the roster consisted of Valkyrie, Misty Knight, Annabelle Riggs, Warrior Woman, Danielle Moonstar and Clea. The following year, she was part of the Doctor Doom's Avengers team in the pages of Avengers World, written by Nick Spencer, they were tied in to line wide AXIS storyline. During the Secret Wars event, she was the main character of Marvel Zombies: Battleworld, with Elsa being one of the few characters to remember the events of Battleworld following the event.

During the Civil War II event, she showed up in the series A-Force as a supporting character.

She was one of the main characters in the 2017's company-wide crossover story arc Monsters Unleashed. The crossover included a huge cast of superheroes, consisting of the Avengers, Champions, Moon Girl and Devil Dinosaur, Guardians of the Galaxy, Inhumans, Kid Kaiju, the Leviathon Tide, and the X-Men.

In the limited series Damnation, Wong summoned her to be a member of a new version of the Midnight Sons alongside Blade, Doctor Voodoo, Ghost Rider, Iron Fist, and Man-Thing, a superhero team focused on supernatural phenomena. She returned in Kelly Thompson's Jessica Jones, she aided the titular character in the first storyarc.

== Characterization ==
=== Fictional character biography ===
After turning eighteen, Elsa inherited Bloodstone Manor and a fragment of the Bloodgem, which she wears on a choker necklace, from her father Ulysses Bloodstone. She was subsequently recruited by Dirk Anger of H.A.T.E. to join the Nextwave squad alongside Monica Rambeau, Tabitha Smith, Aaron Stack, and the Captain, battling the terrorist-funded Beyond Corporation across the United States. Following the team's disbandment, she returned to England and took up a teaching post at the Braddock Academy, where her younger brother Cullen was enrolled as a student.

Her monster-hunting career continued through a series of shifting alliances. She worked alongside Adam, the Frankenstein Monster, and the Legion of Monsters, and later assisted the Fearless Defenders when monsters overran Chinatown. During the AXIS event, she was recruited onto a team of Avengers assembled by an inverted Doctor Doom to protect Latverian civilians. During the "Secret Wars" event, Elsa served as the protagonist of Marvel Zombies: Battleworld, becoming the commander of super-powered soldiers manning a wall called the Shield that keeps the threats of the Deadlands, Perfection, and New Xandar from the rest of the Battleworld domains. A teleportation accident left Elsa far from safety, hunted by powered zombies in the Deadlands and with a strange human girl she dubbed Shuttup in her care. Following the event, Elsa was one of the few characters to remember the events of Battleworld and the events of this series, retaining her Battleworld ability to now shoot a projectile from her hand, which she subsequently used to fight alongside A-Force against a Poison invasion, before entering a rocky partnership with Deadpool during his tenure as king of Monster Island.

On returning to England after the Monster Island campaign, Elsa learned she had a half-sister, Lyra, a child of Ulysses from centuries earlier who had been taken from Earth by his alien enemies.

=== Powers and abilities ===
Elsa has exhibited superhuman strength, speed, durability and endurance, and a regenerative healing factor. She appears to possess all of the abilities her father once had. In addition, she has demonstrated immunity to vampire bites (her blood will kill a vampire if consumed and the original Bloodgem fragment itself is anathema to vampires).

The Bloodgem first appeared in Marvel Presents #1 (1975), created by writers Marv Wolfman and Len Wein with John Warner, and illustrated by Mike Vosburg. It is depicted as a cosmic artifact that fell to Earth in prehistoric times and became embedded in the chest of the man who would come to be known as Ulysses Bloodstone, granting him enhanced strength, endurance, and an ability to detect monsters. After Ulysses' death, the gem split into two pieces; the larger half passed to Elsa and the smaller to her brother Cullen.

Some of her powers were bestowed upon her by the Bloodgem fragment she wears on a choker, although she does not appear to be wearing it in flashbacks to her childhood training sessions. Elsa has also inherited at least some of the Bloodgem's power genetically from her father. She has also been portrayed as an expert marksman.

Elsa is able to fire energy blasts from her right hand, and claims that her father ripped off her original hand and replaced it with an apparently magical one. This power was introduced in the "Secret Wars" series Marvel Zombies: Battleworld, of which Elsa was the protagonist, Elsa having been one of the few characters to remember the events of Battleworld and the events of this series following its end.

She has been shown to use a removable Bloodgem on a choker as well as a number of artifacts gathered by her father. These include a lamp which contained a genie whom Ulysses had enslaved years ago. This serves as an early warning system, lighting up during times of supernatural crisis, and transporting him to said crisis. In Nextwave, she carries a guitar case with a false cover, containing two Uzis and a rifle.

== Reception ==
=== Critical response ===
Elijah Beahm of The Escapist asserted, "Above all else though, what makes Elsa an attractive character for adaptation is her versatility. You can put Elsa Bloodstone virtually anywhere, and she's still authentically herself. She's been everything from the last woman on Earth fighting zombies during the Battleworld crossover to partnering with Jessica Jones on a PI case." Deirdre Kaye of Scary Mommy called Elsa Bloodstone a "role model" and "truly heroic."

Chris McMullen of Space.com ranked Elsa Bloodstone 4th in their "5 Marvel Characters Who Deserve Their Own Show" list. CBR.com ranked Elsa Bloodstone 3rd in their "10 Best Members Of Marvel's Legion Of Monsters" list, and 10th in their "10 Most Powerful Members of Marvel's Midnight Sons" list. Matthew Jackson of The A.V. Club ranked Elsa Bloodstone 8th in their "15 Marvel superheroes and villains we want to see in the MCU" list. Darby Harn of Screen Rant ranked Elsa Bloodstone 9th in their "10 Most Powerful Marvel Comics Horror Characters" list.

=== Comparisons to Buffy ===
As she is a young, female monster-hunter consumers have speculated that there must be some influence from Buffy the Vampire Slayer, when asked about this the authors claimed "neither of us have seen an episode of Buffy all the way through! I know we're missing out on some great TV but we've determined to steer clear of Buffy at least while we're doing Bloodstone."

== Supporting characters ==
Jeff the Land Shark became a recurring companion to Elsa during the period in which she worked alongside Deadpool in his monster kingdom. Though initially uncertain about the animal, she became one of his most devoted protectors over the course of Deadpool vol. 7 #1–10, to a degree that the series played for comic effect.

During Kelly Thompson's run on Deadpool, beginning with issue #7 and illustrated by Gerardo Sandoval, Elsa developed a romantic entanglement with Wade Wilson that Thompson characterized as a love/hate dynamic. The arc centered on a corruption of the Bloodgem that left Elsa dying, with Deadpool as the unlikely figure positioned to save her. Thompson drew parallels between the two characters, both highly dangerous individuals with a flexible moral code who struggle to integrate into conventional superhero roles, as the basis for their pairing.

== Other versions ==
=== Iron Man: Viva Las Vegas ===
In an archaeological expedition, Elsa and her team find the stone statue of Fin Fang Foom. She sells this statue to Tony Stark for the opening of his new casino, only for the statue to release the actual dragon himself from his stone tomb.

=== Marvel Zombies ===
Elsa Bloodstone alongside the other members of Nextwave show up "in a purely superfluous cameo" in the third issue of the Marvel Zombies vs. The Army of Darkness to save Ash from a zombified Power Pack, before being "ruthlessly dispatched off-panel in the most humiliating and degrading ways imaginable" moments later.

== In other media ==
=== Television ===
Elsa Bloodstone appears in Werewolf by Night, portrayed by Laura Donnelly. Director Michael Giacchino deliberately moved away from the character's comics presentation, which he described as hypersexualized, reworking her costume from the crop top and high heels of the source material into more practical attire. "I wanted her to be badass, of course, but I wanted her to be smart, I wanted her to be vulnerable, I just wanted her to be a real person," Giacchino said. "Laura Donnelly embodies all of that in spades."

=== Video games ===
- Elsa Bloodstone appears as a playable character in Marvel: Avengers Alliance.
- Elsa Bloodstone appears as a playable character in Marvel Puzzle Quest.
- Elsa Bloodstone appears as a playable character in Marvel Contest of Champions.
- Elsa Bloodstone appears as a playable character in Marvel: Future Fight.
- Elsa Bloodstone appears as a playable character in Marvel Avengers Academy, voiced by Jeni Dean.
- Elsa Bloodstone appears as a playable character in Marvel Strike Force.
- Elsa Bloodstone appears as a playable character in Marvel Ultimate Alliance 3: The Black Order, voiced by Kari Wahlgren.
- Elsa Bloodstone appears in Marvel Snap.
- Elsa Bloodstone appears as a playable character in Marvel Rivals, voiced by Helen Sadler. She was added to the game in Season 6.5 in February 2026. She is depicted as a mobile hunter who alternates between a rifle and shotgun while deploying traps, including one that summons a creature called Diablo to restrain opponents. A team-up ability with Deadpool modifies her projectiles so that enemies who are struck also hear Deadpool's voice.
