= Hannibal King =

Marvel Comics character

- Hannibal King; Art by Howard Chaykin

Publication information
- Publisher: Marvel Comics
- First appearance: The Tomb of Dracula #25 (Oct. 1974)
- Created by: Gene Colan (Artist); Marv Wolfman (Writer)

In-story information
- Team affiliations: Nightstalkers; Midnight Sons
- Notable aliases: Henry Kagle
- Abilities: Regeneration; Superhuman strength and speed Halted aging Ability to turn into mist Ability to transform into a werewolf Flight; Skilled detective and marksman

Hannibal King is a character appearing in American comic books published by Marvel Comics. He first appeared as a supporting character in the title The Tomb of Dracula, issue #25 (Oct. 1974).

King was played by Ryan Reynolds in the 2004 film Blade: Trinity.

== Fictional character biography ==
Hannibal King was born in Milwaukee, Wisconsin. Working as a private detective, King was bitten and killed by Deacon Frost while on a case in London, England. Horrified to find himself one of the undead, King vowed never to consummate the curse by passing it on. He subsists on blood purchased or stolen from blood banks and consumes only corpses or animals. For the most part, eschewing his vampirism, King continues to operate as a private detective, travelling freely only by night.

King was introduced when he was seen confronting Dracula, the lord of Earth's vampires. While searching for Frost, King eventually met Blade, the vampire hunter, whose mother had been killed by Frost, and together they destroy Frost.

== Powers and abilities ==
Hannibal King was once a vampire but was cured. He has retained many of his vampiric abilities. He possesses superhuman speed, strength, and senses. He can withstand and recover from severe physical injury and is nearly ageless, impervious to diseases and poisons, and virtually immortal. He can also instantly hypnotize human victims and fly via directed motion hovering by taking on a mist-like form. He can control rats and uses them to gather information for him during the day. He can also transform into a wolf.

Hannibal also has the weaknesses of a vampire: the need for blood to sustain his existence, the inability to endure direct sunlight, and the standard vampiric vulnerabilities to garlic, silver, and the presence of religious symbols. Beheading, burning, and a wooden stake through the heart would kill him.

Hannibal is a skilled detective who uses a pistol and carries conventional firearms but uses specialized weapons against supernatural opponents.

== Vampirism ==
In the first appearance of Hannibal King (The Tomb of Dracula #25) and during the events of Doctor Strange (volume 2) #59-62, King states that he had been a vampire for about five years. During the events in Journey into Mystery #520-521, King reveals that he had been a vampire for nearly five decades, indicating that he had been a vampire since around the late 1940s. He has openly stated the first figure to others; King declared the latter figure of five decades only in narration.

In The Tomb of Dracula #25, the reader is not immediately told that Hannibal is a vampire until the final panel.

It was stated in Nightstalkers #1 (Aug. 1992) that King's neo-vampire status (craving blood but not needing it to survive, as well as his limited ability to tolerate sunlight) was because he never directly consumes blood from a living human, which is also how he stays the Montesi Formula. However, this neo-vampire condition was never alluded to again after his seeming death in Nightstalkers #18 (April 1994). After that, he was shown to be a regular vampire with all of the traditional strengths and weaknesses, identical to his status before the Montesi Formula was cast.

== In other media ==
Ryan Reynolds as Hannibal King in Blade: Trinity.

Hannibal King appears in Blade: Trinity (2004), portrayed by Ryan Reynolds. This version is a wisecracking yet combat ready member of a vampire hunting group known as the Nightstalkers allied with Blade and led by Abigail Whistler, a character created for the film and based on a recurring character from the film franchise. The film includes the premise that King is a former vampire, having been turned by Danica Talos, and cured by the retrovirus serum that was developed in Blade (1998).

Reynolds has said that his performance reminded a rival executive of Marvel antihero Deadpool. The exec is said to have told Reynolds, "Trust me, if they ever make a movie about Deadpool, you're the only guy who can play Deadpool," and sent Reynolds a copy of the comic, Cable & Deadpool #2, in which Deadpool refers to his own scarred appearance as "Ryan Reynolds crossed with a Shar-Pei." When Reynolds read that comic that name-dropped him, he fell in love with the character and was driven to bring him to the films.

== Reception ==
Hannibal King was ranked #25 on a listing of Marvel Comics' monster characters in 2015.

In 2021, Screen Rant included Hannibal King in their "Marvel: 10 Most Powerful Vampires" list.
