= Strange Academy =

Superhero comic book series

- Cover to Strange Academy #1 (March 2020). Art by Humberto Ramos.

Group publication information
- Publisher: Marvel Comics
- First appearance: Strange Academy Vol. 1 #1 (March 2020)
- Created by: Skottie Young; Humberto Ramos

In-story information
- Base(s): Bourbon Street, New Orleans
- Leader(s): Doctor Strange; Doctor Voodoo

Strange Academy

Series publication information
- Format: Ongoing series
- Publication date: (Volume 1) March 2020 - July 6, 2022; (Volume 2) October 2022
- Number of issues: (Volume 1): 18, 1 Special; (Volume 2): 6
- Creator(s): Skottie Young; Humberto Ramos

Strange Academy is a fictional school appearing in American comic books published by Marvel Comics. It was founded by Doctor Strange to train young people from many worlds with magical abilities in the use of sorcery and magical artifacts. The school first appears in Strange Academy #1 (March 2020) and was created by writer Skottie Young and artist Humberto Ramos.

== Publication history ==
Strange Academy began after Marvel writer and illustrator Skottie Young pitched the idea to fellow Marvel artist Humberto Ramos, who was intrigued by it. Young wanted to tell a "classic coming of age [story]… seen in so many other properties". Having just visited New Orleans, Young found the city the ideal setting for the folklore and magic of the series.

== Year One ==
In January 2022, it was announced that the first volume of the series would conclude with issue #18, with a new volume set to launch soon afterward.

The series follows the first year in the Academy, released in 4 volumes, that are also sold in two books, it includes Volume 1 and volume 2.

=== Strange Academy Volume 1: First Class ISBN 978-1302919504 ===
It includes Chapters 1 to 6.

=== Strange Academy Volume 2: Bright Side ISBN 978-1302939366 ===
It includes Chapters 7 to 12.

== Year Two ==
Strange Academy: Year Two was released on January 23, 2024. It includes the content of "Strange Academy Volume 3: Wish Craft" and Strange Academy Volume 4: Finals.

=== Strange Academy Volume 3: Wish Craft ISBN 978-1302932527 ===
It includes Chapters 13 to 18.

Chapter 13: Calvin start losing his abilities after losing his jacket, meanwhile Emily release The Imperator not from his physical prison but from his own mind.The group decided to out on Friday night, they end up in the graveyard where they found Marie Laveau, and tells her story, when she was young all the members of her family have many magical abilities but she did not compete to them, she decided to go to "Gaslamp" to receive a wish, and she was able to perform her works but the wishes did not last to long and she could not keep paying the wishes and died, her mother put an x to Maria Laveau's grave and wished to return to life and she did it, but her form was as a zombie, to resolved her mother used magic to make her look as a normal human.

Chapter 14: Calvin heard about Gaslamp and ask about him, when he found him he start asking wishes. Meanwhile, Doctor Voodoo is giving time travel classes and how to see past future and other timelines, and the danger of changing them due to the effects of it. Doyle sees himself in the future as a powerful person destroying the rest of strange academy classmates and decides to leave the school leaving a not in his room.

Chapter 15: Emily found the note and thinks he is gone, but then found him and he explain her that Dr. Voodoo told Doyle that leaving the school could be what trigger his change. Calving go to Gaslamp without money and he ask him to bring customers instead.

Chapter 16: Dr. Voodoo is told that the death of the Sorcerer Supreme brought a fracture on the Mystical Balance and that the school is going to ration magic use to be used only during classes. Voodoo is expelled for putting the students in danger. Calvin tells Emily what happened.

Chapter 17: Doyle and Emily disagree in the acceptance of Calvin's expulsion. Calvin is sent home but decided to return and work for Gaslamp. Emily and a group of students decided to leave the school until they are taken seriously and are heard.

Chapter 18: Strange academy teachers decide to go to the Sanctum Sanctorum and talk with Emily and the students. Doyle realizes that the ring that he gave to Emily is what is controlling her. The mindful ones hold the students in the Sanctum Sanctorum but Emily gains their control. And she decide to go with the students to the "new home in the dark dimension".

=== Strange Academy Volume 4: Finals ISBN 978-1302932534 ===
In July 2023 was published the fourth volume of the series: Strange Academy: Finals with Young and Ramos returning from the previous volume.

This is the continuation of Wish Craft, on it Emily is still in the Dark Dimension, but decides to go the end of year celebration in the Academy, she go with Doyle's father, but they are defeated and the end of year ceremony continues.

== Characters ==
=== Faculty ===
Character	Real Name	Joined in	Notes
Doctor Strange	Dr. Stephen Strange	Strange Academy #1 (March 2020)	Founder
Doctor Voodoo	Jericho Drumm	Strange Academy #1 (March 2020)	Headmaster and a teacher of Introduction to the Undead and Time Travel.
Zelma Stanton		Strange Academy #1 (March 2020)	She is a teacher of Anatomy and Inter-dimensional Geography.
Ancient One	Yao	Strange Academy #1 (March 2020)	He is a teacher of Advanced Astral Projections, History of Mystical Objects, and Parallel Realms.
Mindful One		Strange Academy #1 (March 2020)	An enhanced Mindless One who is a co-teacher of Sanctum Economics.
Prof. Emeritus Harkness	Agatha Harkness	Prior to Strange Academy #2 (July 2020)	She is a teacher of Infiltration of Magically Secured Locations and Spells and Summons.
Coach Taylor		Prior to Strange Academy #2 (July 2020)	Gym teacher
Sister Sara		Prior to Strange Academy #2 (July 2020)	She is also known as Caretaker and is a teacher of World and Heavenly History.
Señor Mágico		Prior to Strange Academy #2 (July 2020)	He is a teacher of AP Microeconomics.
Doctor Doom	Dr. Victor von Doom	Doom Academy #1 (February 2025)	While Sorcerer Supreme during the events of One World Under Doom, he declares himself Headmaster.

=== Adjunct faculty ===
Character	Real Name	Joined in	Notes
Scarlet Witch	Wanda Maximoff	Strange Academy #1 (March 2020)	She is a teacher of Elements of Chaos Magic and Perception of Realms.
Magik	Illyana Rasputina	Strange Academy #1 (March 2020)	She is a co-teacher of Defense Against Vampires, Inferno, and Mystical Defense.
Hellstrom	Daimon Hellstrom	Strange Academy #1 (March 2020)	He is a co-teacher of Inferno.
Sister Grimm	Nico Minoru	Strange Academy #1 (March 2020)	She is a teacher of Creative Spellcasting and is a co-teacher of Defense Against Vampires.
Shaman	Dr. Michael Twoyoungmen	Strange Academy #1 (March 2020)	He is a teacher of Premed Inter-Spiritual Studies.
Man-Thing	Dr. Theodore "Ted" Sallis	Prior to Strange Academy #2 (July 2020)	He is a teacher of Care for Magical Plants.
Dead Girl	Moonbeam	Prior to Strange Academy #2 (July 2020)	She is a teacher of Necromancer Languages.
Wong		Prior to Strange Academy #2 (July 2020)	He is a co-teacher of Mystical Defense and Sanctum Economics.
Rintrah		Prior to Strange Academy #2 (July 2020)	He is a math teacher.
Kanna	Pkzkrfmknna	Prior to Strange Academy #8 (February 2021)	She once led some students to obtain the Orb of Mortum on another planet.
Sleepwalker	Richard Sheridan	Prior to Strange Academy #9 (May 2021)	He is a teacher of Nocturnal Architecture.
Sersi		Prior to Strange Academy Presents: The Death of Doctor Strange (Nov 2021)	Special Guest Instructor for Sports Day Supreme
Stevie Hunter		Prior to Strange Academy: Finals #5 (Mar 2023)	Guest Lecturer and Director of the Astral Dance Company
Blade	Eric Brooks	Midnight Suns #1 (Sep 2023)	Guest Lecturer for Defense Against Vampires

=== Students ===
Character	Joined in	Notes
Emily Bright	Strange Academy #1 (March 2020)	A magic user.
Doyle Dormammu	Strange Academy #1 (March 2020)	The "son" of Dormammu.
Shaylee Moonpeddle	Strange Academy #1 (March 2020)	A fairy.
Alvi Brorson	Strange Academy #1 (March 2020)	The son of Enchantress and an Asgardian soldier named Bror.
Iric Brorson	Strange Academy #1 (March 2020)	The brother of Alvi Brorson and the son of Enchantress and an Asgardian soldier named Bror. Killed by Emily Bright.
Dessy	Strange Academy #1 (March 2020)	The daughter of S'ym.
Zoe Laveau	Strange Academy #1 (March 2020)	A descendant of Jacquette Laveau.
Toth	Strange Academy #1 (March 2020)	The son of the Crystal Warrior Blythir and a Man-Thing named "Mossy" making him a hybrid of both creatures.
Guslaug	Strange Academy #1 (March 2020)	A Frost Giant.
Germán Aguilar	Strange Academy #1 (March 2020)	An Animage who can create animal-like constructs.
Calvin Morse	Strange Academy #1 (March 2020)	A magic user.
Howard "Howie" Scott	Prior to Strange Academy #5 (November 2020)	A dog-like creature.
Nasirah Noorani	Prior to Strange Academy #6 (December 2020)	Didn't appear in comics, just mentioned.
Heidi	Prior to Strange Academy #11 (June 2021)	A student who sided with Emily Bright during Dormammu's invasion.
Geraldine O'Malley	Prior to Strange Academy Vol. 2: Bright Side (October 2021)	Didn't appear in comics, just mentioned.
Eva Quintero	Marvel's Voices: Comunidates #1 (December 2021)	The cousin of Reptil who is a magic user.
Pia	Strange Academy: Blood Hunt #1 (May 2024)	A girl who was turned into a vampire and was saved by Doctor Voodoo.
Darkhold	Strange Academy: Blood Hunt #3 (July 2024)	A copy of the Darkhold that was transformed into a humanoid child in Contest of Chaos.
Marta	Doom Academy #1 (February 2025)	Zoe's superstitious roommate at Doom Academy.
Scoop	Doom Academy #1 (February 2025)	The son of The Editor, Latveria's premier propagandist. Head of Doom Academy's school newspaper.
Drulinda	Doom Academy #1 (February 2025)	Shaylee's vampire roommate at Doom Academy.
Greta Montimore	Doom Academy #2 (March 2025)	A former student of Doom Academy who was trapped in a storybook world.
Monte	Flunked out prior to New Champions #5 (May 2025)	A smooth-talking card magic user who is involved with the New Champions.

== Collected editions ==
Title	Material collected	Publication Date	ISBN
Strange Academy Vol. 1: First Class	Strange Academy #1-6	March 2021	978-1302919504
Strange Academy Vol. 2: Bright Side	Strange Academy #7-12	October 2021	978-1302939366
Strange Academy Vol. 3: Wish Craft	Strange Academy #13-18	May 2022	978-1302932527
Strange Academy: Finals	Strange Academy: Finals #1-6	Jul 2023	978-1302932534
Strange Academy: The Deadly Field Trip	Strange Academy: Miles Morales #1, Strange Academy: Moon Knight #1, Strange Academy: Amazing Spider-Man #1 and Strange Academy Presents: The Death of Doctor Strange #1	Mar 2024	978-1302954833
Strange Academy: Year One	Strange Academy #1-12	Jan 2023	978-1302949662
Strange Academy: Year Two	Strange Academy #13-18 and Strange Academy: Finals #1-6	Jan 2024	978-1302953003
Strange Academy: First Class	Strange Academy #1-6	Oct 2022	978-1302945756
Death of Doctor Strange Companion	Strange Academy Presents: The Death Of Doctor Strange #1 and Death Of Doctor Strange: Bloodstone #1, Death Of Doctor Strange: Avengers #1, Death Of Doctor Strange: Spider-Man #1, Death Of Doctor Strange: White Fox #1, Death Of Doctor Strange: Blade #1, Death Of Doctor Strange: X-Men/Black Knight #1	March 2022	978-1302933104
