= Toth Brand Imaging =

Advertising agency

Toth+Co
- Company type: Privately Owned
- Industry: Branding, Design, Marketing, Advertising
- Founded: 1982
- Headquarters: Concord, Massachusetts, USA
- Number of locations: 2
- Area served: Worldwide
- Key people: Mike Toth (Founder)
- Website: www.toth.com

Toth + Co is a privately owned advertising agency and design firm. The agency is based in Concord, Massachusetts with an office in New York City. The company has worked with clients such as J.Crew, Tommy Hilfiger, Wrangler Jeans, Nautica and Johnston & Murphy.

In 2003, Mike Toth helped brand "Labels Are For Jars", an initiative to raise funds for the construction of the Cor Unum Meal Center in Lawrence, Massachusetts, which provides round-the-clock food and services to people in need. Construction of the Meal Center was completed in Fall 2006.

== History ==
Founded by Mike Toth in 1982, the agency was first headquartered in New Orleans, located at the riverbend on the streetcar line. In 1985, Toth moved the company north to Concord, Massachusetts, behind the historic Old North Bridge.

In 1987, Toth moved into the neighboring town of Carlisle, basing his store in a renovated church. In 1995, Toth moved back to Concord into the historic courthouse on Monument Square, where it stayed for 11 years before settling in the Kendall Square area of Cambridge in 2006.

In December 2013, Toth moved its location to the South End area of Boston.
