= Toth alias Soky =

Hungarian noble family

- Toth Soky's coat of arms
- Country: Kingdom of Hungary
- Origin: Upper Hungary, Nytra county
- Founded: Ennobled in 1647
- Founder: Paulus Tott alias Soky
- Connected families: Kelcz, Pongrácz, Raszlaviczy, Révay
- Traditions: Catholic
- Website: toth-soky.com

The Toth alias Soky family (initially Tott alias Soky) was a Hungarian noble family, ennobled in 1647 by King Ferdinand III.

== Origins ==
On June 11, 1647, Paulus Tott, his brother Joannes, and his son Andreas were ennobled in Pozsony castle by king Ferdinand III. This act was published on December 3, 1648, in Nytra county.

== See also ==
- List of titled noble families in the Kingdom of Hungary
