= Nightstalkers (comics) =

Fictional comic book

- Nightstalkers #1 (Nov. 1992); Cover art by Ron Garney and Tom Palmer

Publication information
- Publisher: Marvel Comics
- First appearance: Ghost Rider (vol. 3) #28 (August 1992)

In-story information
- Base(s): 2180 Commonwealth Ave., Boston
- Member(s): Blade; Frank Drake; Hannibal King; Abraham Whistler; Abigail Whistler

Nightstalkers is an American comic book series published by Marvel Comics from 1992 to 1994, featuring a trio of occult experts reluctantly banded together to fight supernatural threats. Operating under the business name Borderline Investigations, the team was composed of vampire hunters Blade and Frank Drake and private detective Hannibal King, all of whom had fought Count Dracula in the 1970s series The Tomb of Dracula. They are gathered by Doctor Strange in Nightstalkers #1 (November 1992) to battle an immediate threat, but under Strange's larger, hidden agenda.

The Nightstalkers appeared in the film Blade: Trinity (2004).

== Publication history ==
The team of vampire-hunters Blade and Frank Drake and vampiric private detective Hannibal King first reunited in Ghost Rider (vol. 3) #28 (cover dated August 1992). They subsequently starred in their own series, Nightstalkers, which ran 18 issues (November 1992–April 1994). It incorporated story threads from previous Marvel Comics supernatural series, primarily The Tomb of Dracula (April 1972–August 1979) where the three protagonists had first appeared.

The series' initial creative team was writer D. G. Chichester, penciller Ron Garney and inker Tom Palmer, with Palmer returning from The Tomb of Dracula. After 11 issues, Steven Grant took over scripting, with Frank Lovece wrapping up the fates of some of the 1970s series' characters in the last three issues. Artists included Mark Pacella, Kirk Van Wormer and Andrew Wildman.

== Fictional team history ==
Before being formally gathered by Doctor Strange to fight supernatural threats, Hannibal King, Frank Drake, and Blade had founded the detective agency King, Drake, and Blade (later renamed Borderline Investigations).

After Strange manipulates the trio into forming the Nightstalkers, the team fights many emerging supernatural enemies. These include Lilith, Mother of All Demons; Hydra's Department of Occult Armaments (DOA), led by Lt. Belial, and its renegade Dracula clone Bloodstorm; and the vampire lord Varnae.

=== The Tomb of Dracula threads ===
Blade (standing), King (background) and Drake (foreground): Nightstalkers #16 (February 1994): Cover art by Bill Wylie and Frank Turner.

In the final arc (#16–18, Feb.-April 1994), King's house, including Borderline's office, is destroyed by a Hydra Dreadnought stealing Drake's anti-occult nanotech gun, the Exorcist. Doctor Strange reveals that the Montesi Formula, which had eradicated and prevented further vampires, is weakening. In response, he explains, he had gathered the three most experienced vampire-hunters so they could learn to function as a team before Dracula, the Lord of Vampires, returned. Since all three were traumatized by their early vampiric battles, Strange held off informing them of vampires' possible return until necessary.

In a final battle, Varnae, a previous Lord of Vampires who had already returned, takes psychic control of King and directs him to kill his comrades. King stakes himself instead. Drake attempts to sacrifice his own life to kill Varnae, engineering an Exorcist-powered explosion. Blade, in self-defense, has already staked Taj Nital, his old comrade from The Tomb of Dracula (who had been turned vampiric between the two series). Blade survives and attends his teammates' funeral but encounters King again in the subsequent series Blade. There he learns King's plunge into a metal pole (rather than silver or wood) had fortuitously not killed him and that he had escaped the explosion. King also informs Blade that Drake was left scarred and crippled in both body and mind.

=== Avengers Assemble ===
Following the "Blood Hunt" storyline, which resulted in major rise in the vampire population who are now immune to sunlight, fanatical vampire hunter Abby Morris reorganizes the Nightstalkers, now consisting of pseudo-vampires Bloodscream, Coma, and Voracious and the reanimated body of Frank Drake, who is under Bloodscream's control. The new Nightstalkers target a community of peaceful vampires and their human families living on North Brother Island and proceed to massacre them. Avengers Emergency Response Squad members She-Hulk, Lightspeed, Lightning, and Wonder Man arrive to save the vampires from the Nightstalkers. Drake regains his senses and turns on his former team before dying, while the other members are defeated and arrested.

== Membership ==
- Hannibal King
- Frank Drake
- Blade
- Abby Morris
- Bloodscream
- Coma
- Voracious

== In other media ==
The Nightstalkers appear in Blade: Trinity, led by Abigail Whistler and consisting of Dr. Sommerfield, Hedges, Zoe Sommerfield, and Gedge. Most of the group, with the exception of Zoe and Abigail, are killed by Dracula.
