= Howard Mackie =

American comic book editor and writer (born 1958)

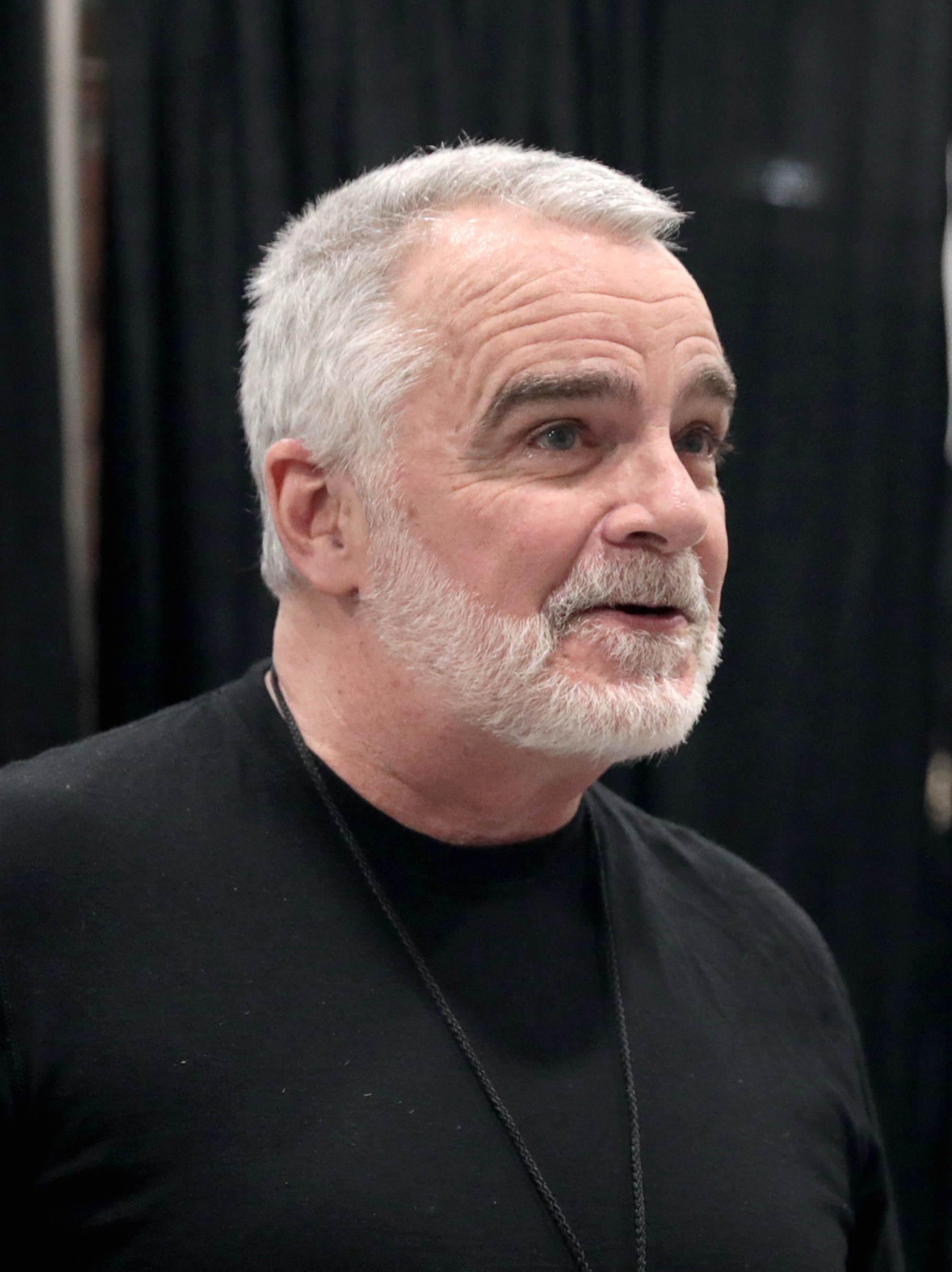
- Mackie at the 2022 Phoenix Fan Fusion
- Born: January 22, 1958 (age 68)
- Areas: Writer, Editor
- Notable works: Ghost Rider, Spider-Man

Howard Mackie (born January 22, 1958) is an American comic book editor and writer. He has worked almost exclusively for Marvel Comics and is best known as the co-creator of the Danny Ketch version of the Ghost Rider character.

== Early life ==
Mackie grew up in Cypress Hills, Brooklyn, mostly raised by his mother, as his father died when he was seven.

== Career ==
=== Editor ===
Mackie started his career in comics in 1984 as an assistant editor for Mark Gruenwald. Early in Mackie's career, a running gag in Gruenwald's columns was that Mackie was a mysterious figure whose face no one at Marvel had ever seen. Promoted in early 1987 to Managing Editor of Special Projects, Mackie then oversaw Marvel's "New Universe" line.

=== Writer ===
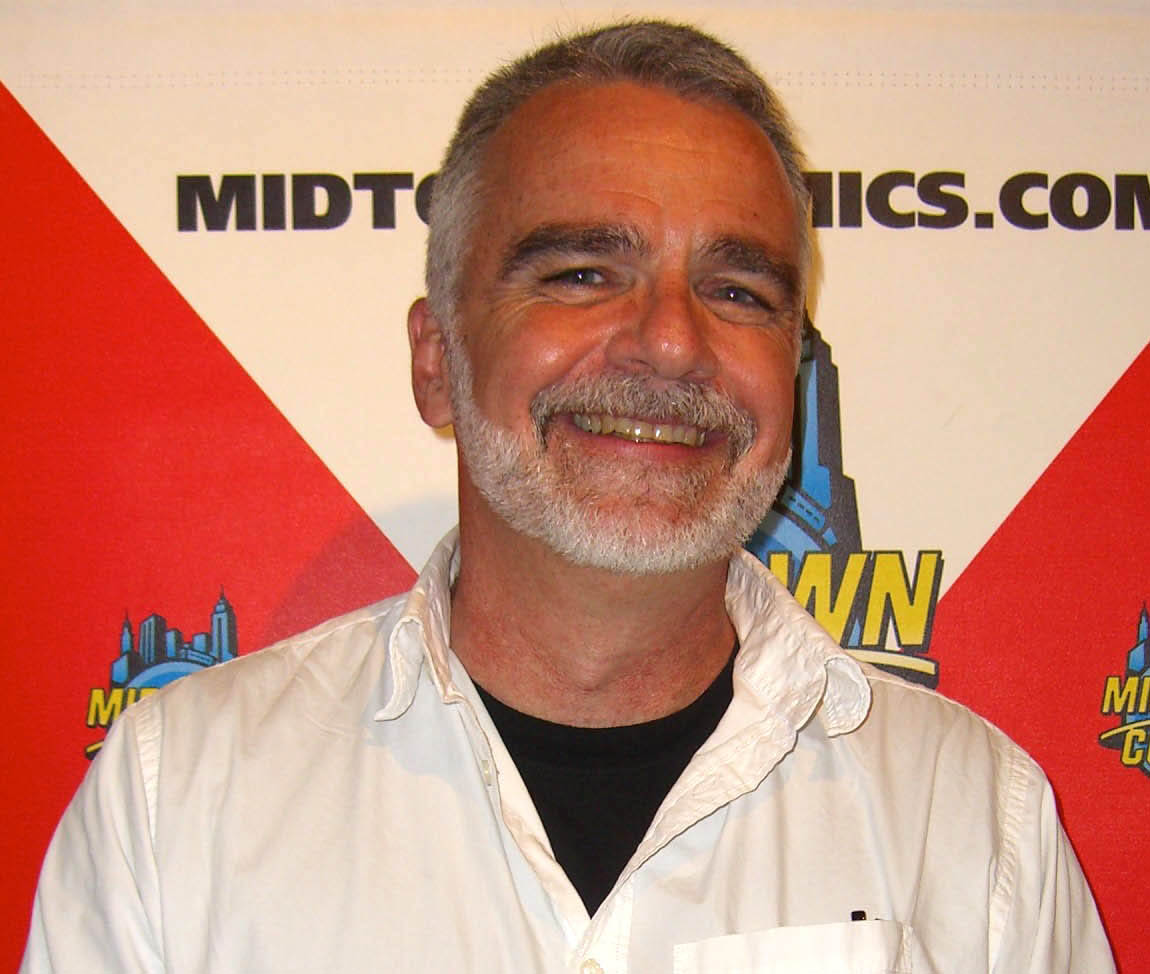
Mackie at a signing for Ravagers #1 at Midtown Comics in Manhattan

Mackie first gained attention as a writer in 1990, when he and artist Javier Saltares launched a new Ghost Rider series for Marvel, revamping the character and introducing a new host, Danny Ketch. The series "made my rep. writing comics" Mackie later said. Mackie wrote Ghost Rider until issue #69 (Jan. 1996). He authored two Ghost Rider/Wolverine/Punisher team-up one-shots, Hearts of Darkness (1991) and its sequel The Dark Design (1994).

Mackie became the writer of Web of Spider-Man with #84 (Jan. 1992). He would remain on various Spider-Man titles through the Clone Saga. In January 1999, Mackie became the writer of both The Amazing Spider-Man and the Peter Parker: Spider-Man series when those two titles were relaunched with new first issues. Mackie left the Spider-Man franchise with The Amazing Spider-Man vol. 2, #29 (May 2001).

After seeing the unexpectedly high sales figures for Hearts of Darkness, the X-Men editor Bob Harras began coaxing Mackie to write for the X-Men family of titles. Mackie's work on the X-Men line included writing the spin-off title X-Factor from #115–149 (1995–1998) as well as its successor title Mutant X (1998–2001). He wrote several mini-series featuring Gambit, Wolverine, and Rogue. Mackie also wrote The Brotherhood under the guise of Writer X. The series ran for nine issues from 2001–2002.

In late 2009, Mackie teamed with Tom DeFalco to write the six issue miniseries Spider-Man: Clone Saga, whose story was based on Mackie's original notes for the 1990s crossover. It was later collected in the trade paperback Spider-Man: The Real Clone Saga.

Mackie wrote The Ravagers series for DC Comics in 2012 as part of the "Second Wave" of The New 52, DC's 2011 reboot of its entire line of monthly comics, and the continuity in which those books were set.

== Style ==
Though he has often been required to write using the full script method, Mackie said that his preference has always been for the Marvel method, commenting that "full script ... means that the writer is dictating to the artist. This seems like an assbackwards way of doing things. Artists have a sense of storytelling that they bring to the project. That's what it should be from my personal experience. [The Marvel method] gave me more story to play with. Just the little things. What I refer to as the happy accidents. Things that I didn't necessarily ask for in the plot. All of a sudden it's on the page."

== Bibliography ==
=== DC Comics ===
- Batman Black and White vol. 2 #1 (2013)
- Ravagers #1–7, 0 (2012–2013)
- Speed Demon #1 (1996)

=== Marvel Comics ===
- Air Raiders #1–3 (1987–1988)
- The Amazing Spider-Man vol. 2 #1–29 (1999–2001)
- The Amazing Spider-Man 1999
- The Amazing Spider-Man 2000
- The Amazing Spider-Man 2001
- Astonishing X-Men #1–3 (1995)
- Avengers #397 (1996) (co-written with Terry Kavanagh)
- Avengers Spotlight #21–25, 27–29 (1989–1990)
- Blaze: Legacy of Blood #1–4 (1993–1994)
- The Brotherhood #1–9 (2001–2002), as Writer X
- Chuck Norris Karate Kommandos #4 (1987)
- Danny Ketch: Ghost Rider #1–4 (2023)
- D.P. 7 #21 (1988)
- Gambit #1–4 (1993–1994)
- Gambit vol. 2 #1–4 (1997)
- Ghost Rider vol. 3 #1–69, Annual #1 (1990–1996)
- Ghost Rider/Blaze:Spirits of Vengeance #1–23 (1992–1994)
- Ghost Rider:Return of Vengeance #1 (2021)
- Ghost Rider/Wolverine/Punisher: Dark Design #1 (1995)
- Ghost Rider/Wolverine/Punisher: Hearts of Darkness #1 (1991)
- Ghost Riders: Crossroads #1 (1995)
- Impossible Man Summer Vacation Spectacular #1 (1990)
- Iron Man #211 (1986)
- Logan #1 (1996)
- Logan: Shadow Society #1 (1996)
- Marc Spector: Moon Knight #25, 32–33 (1991)
- Marvel Comics Presents #24–31, 64–71, 90–95, 97, 99–106, 117–122 (1989–1993)
- Marvel Holiday Special #1 (1992)
- Midnight Sons Unlimited #1 (1993)
- Mutant X #1–32 (1998–2001)
- Mutant X 2000
- Mutant X 2001
- Peter Parker: Spider-Man #1–19 (1999–2000)
- Power Pack #34 (1988)
- Powerline #8 (1989)
- Psi-Force #22 (1988)
- Rogue #1–4 (1995)
- Scarlet Spider #1–2 (1995)
- Sensational She-Hulk #50 (1993)
- Solo Avengers #12, 18–20 (1988–1989)
- The Spectacular Spider-Man #263 (1998)
- Spider-Man #24, 44–98, −1, (1992–1998)
- Spider-Man: Made Men #1 (1998)
- Tales of the Marvel Universe #1 (1997)
- Uncanny X-Men '96 #1
- Venom: Nights of Vengeance #1–4 (1994)
- Venom: Separation Anxiety #1–4 (1994–1995)
- Web of Spider-Man #84–96 (1992–1993)
- Webspinners: Tales of Spider-Man #13–14 (2000)
- What The--?! #6 (1990)
- X-Factor #115-141, #143-146, #148-149; #-1 (1995–1998)
- X-Men Chronicles #1–2 (1995)
- X-Men Unlimited #7–8, 15 (1994–1997)

Preceded by n/a	Ghost Rider vol. 2 writer 1990–1996	Succeeded by Ivan Velez Jr.
Preceded by Kurt Busiek	Web of Spider-Man writer 1992–1993	Succeeded by Terry Kavanagh
Preceded by Terry Kavanagh	Spider-Man/Peter Parker: Spider-Man writer 1994–1998	Succeeded by n/a
Preceded by John Francis Moore	X-Factor writer 1995–1998	Succeeded by n/a
Preceded by n/a	The Amazing Spider-Man vol. 2 writer 1999–2001	Succeeded by J. Michael Straczynski
Preceded by n/a	Peter Parker: Spider-Man vol. 2 writer 1999–2000	Succeeded by Paul Jenkins
