= Wong (Marvel Comics) =

Fictional character appearing in American comic books published by Marvel Comics

- Wong as depicted in Strange Academy #15 (January 2022). Art by Todd Nauck and Rachelle Rosenberg.

Publication information
- Publisher: Marvel Comics
- First appearance: Strange Tales #110 (July 1963)
- Created by: Stan Lee; Steve Ditko

In-story information
- Species: Human
- Place of origin: Kamar-Taj, Tibet
- Team affiliations: New Avengers; Midnight Sons; W.A.N.D.
- Supporting character of: Doctor Strange
- Notable aliases: Wong
- Abilities: Mastery of magic; Expert martial artist

Wong is a character appearing in American comic books published by Marvel Comics. Created by writer Stan Lee and artist Steve Ditko, the character first appeared in Strange Tales #110 (July 1963). Wong was unnamed until Strange Tales #119 (April 1964). He is a supporting character of the superhero Doctor Strange. He stems from a family of monks living in Kamar-Taj.

The character was portrayed by Clyde Kusatsu in the 1978 television film Dr. Strange. Benedict Wong portrays the character in the Marvel Cinematic Universe films Doctor Strange (2016), Avengers: Infinity War (2018), Avengers: Endgame (2019), Shang-Chi and the Legend of the Ten Rings (2021), Spider-Man: No Way Home (2021), and Doctor Strange in the Multiverse of Madness as well as the Disney+ series She-Hulk: Attorney at Law (both 2022). Additionally, he voices an alternate timeline version in the Disney+ animated series What If...? (2021)

== Publication history ==
Wong debuted in Strange Tales #110 (July 1963), created by Stan Lee and Steve Ditko. He appeared in the 2006 Dr. Strange: the Oath miniseries.

== Fictional character biography ==
Wong is the descendant of Kan, a Chinese monk who lived roughly one thousand years ago and was a student of the occult. Kan was manipulated by Vung, a court magician, into aiding his cause and killing the Wizard Kings. Seeking atonement, Kan and his descendants dedicated themselves to the service of mystics who themselves serve the forces of good.

Wong was born in Kamar-Taj, the first-born son of Hamir, and was dedicated to the Ancient One from childhood. When Wong was four years old, Hamir presented him to the Ancient One. Wong was sent to a remote monastery to become a student of the martial and mystic arts of Kamar-Taj, and receive training in how to serve a master sorcerer. Shortly before Wong's tenth birthday, Hamir brought a young couple to the monastery to visit Wong and made a marriage pact with them, betrothing Wong to their as yet unborn daughter. During his training at the monastery, Wong mastered certain Eastern martial arts. He remains highly adept in the martial arts, although since actually becoming a servant he no longer practices them as much as he once did.

When Wong reached adulthood, the Ancient One sent him to the United States to become a servant of his disciple, Doctor Stephen Strange. Wong was the first member of his family to come to America. Wong has now served Strange loyally and well for many years. During that time Strange has succeeded the Ancient One as sorcerer supreme of the Earth dimension.

Strange's secretary, Sara Wolfe, became strongly attracted to Wong, who began to reciprocate her feelings. However, Wong put an end to what might have become a romance with Wolfe when he was notified that Imei Chang, the woman to whom he was betrothed, had at last come of age to be married.

Wong and Topaz are abducted by the alien sorcerer Urthona and taken to another planet. Urthona mutilates Wong's face while holding him prisoner. Strange defeats Urthona and rescued Wong and Topaz. Back on Earth, Topaz used her healing powers to restore Wong's face to normalcy.

In order to rescue Wong and Topaz, Strange had found it necessary to unleash mystical forces that, he believed, destroyed the mystical talismans and books that Urthona had stolen, thus preventing Urthona from using them for evil purposes. The disappearance of these talismans from Earth broke certain ancient spells holding various mystical menaces in check. Strange subsequently cast a spell causing the population of the world, including Wong and Sara Wolfe, to believe him dead. After defeating Shuma-Gorath, Strange returns to New York City and undoes the effects of his spell.

=== Romances and relationships ===
Sara Wolfe, Strange's neighbor and old friend, enters Wong's life. Ancient demons called 'Eye Killers' kill Wolfe's boyfriend Douglas Royce. Strange later encounters the monsters in battle. Wolfe eventually becomes Strange's secretary and becomes involved romantically with Wong.

Wong has also been romantically involved with Imei, a woman betrothed to him when he was much younger. After many adventures with Wong and Doctor Strange, Imei is killed by Sister Nil, with Strange refusing to save Imei so that he can save many others. This incident causes Wong to become mentally unhinged. For a while he operates as a staunch opponent of Strange. Wong, allying with what he believed to be Imei, kidnapped the real Strange to bring him to the ancient demoness Salome. She was defeated. The two eventually make peace, which involves traveling to another dimension so Wong can say goodbye to Imei's spirit.

=== New Avengers ===
Wong has been a supporting character in the pages of New Avengers, after the events of the "Civil War". Many superheroes who did not wish to register with the government go on the run and Strange opens his home to them. Wong adapts to serving them and later, Strange's new love interest, the Night Nurse. Around this time, Wong develops cancer, and Strange goes on a magical quest that results in a cure. In this same period, Wong is making a shopping trip in New York on Christmas Eve when he encounters a terrorist Hydra cell endangering civilians. His courage in confronting the villains alone causes Fin Fang Foom to assist Wong. After the threat is neutralized, Wong tries to invite Foom back to the Sanctum Sanctorum, but is turned down.

Doctor Strange becomes injured after self-confessed unwise use of dark magics. Returning home, the New Avengers are set upon by the Hood's super-villain army. When Strange is attacked and shot by the Hood, Wong beats him back. The supervillain army's defeat damages the Sanctum enough so that S.H.I.E.L.D. is able to take over. Wong is in the running for the new position of Sorcerer Supreme, but the duties later go to Brother Voodoo.

Wong resurfaced at the behest of Doctor Strange to serve as the New Avengers' housekeeper. After the "Fear Itself" storyline, multiple heroes reorganize themselves at the Avengers Mansion; Wong is angry at this, threatening Edwin Jarvis if the man interferes with his kitchen.

=== Back to Bleecker Street ===
Strange later re-establishes himself at his Bleecker Street Sanctorum. Wong moves back in to provide his essential services. Some of which, as he states to one of Strange's patients are "Chef, housekeeper, martial arts instructor, mystical guardian and insatiable adventurer". It is later established that Wong has been keeping a secret life from Strange. To keep unstable magics from harming the Sorcerer Supreme, Wong has established a willing sect of magical practitioners that take the magical harm upon themselves. Strange believes unstable magics are neutralized by confusing visits to the basement of his Sanctum Sanctorum.

== Powers and abilities ==
Wong is a master martial artist who has achieved mastery in the martial arts of Kamar-Taj. He is capable of incapacitating all manner of terrestrial foe with speed and efficiency. He is also well-acquainted with the dark arts. Wong can hold his own against mystical forces. He developed enough competence at sorcery to be considered a candidate for Sorcerer Supreme at one point.

== Reception ==
Cameron Bonomolo of ComicBook.com ranked Wong 9th in their "Steve Ditko’s 10 Best Marvel Co-Creations" list and called him a "worthy sorcerer in his own right." Comic Book Resources ranked Wong 2nd in their "10 Smartest Marvel Sidekicks" list and 7th in their "10 Strongest Marvel Sidekicks" list.

== Other versions ==
=== Earth X ===
An alternate universe version of Wong appears in Earth X. After Doctor Strange's astral form is killed by Clea, Wong takes care of Strange's body. He is manipulated by Mephisto, who promises Wong a world that works against Strange's interests.

=== Marvel Adventures ===
In Marvel Adventures, Jason Wong is a friend of Stephen Strange from his college years. After being involved in a car accident, Strange suffers a severe mental breakdown, with Wong becoming his caretaker. Wong takes Strange to the Ancient One, who he quickly befriends.

=== Marvel Zombies ===
In Marvel Zombies vs. The Army of Darkness #3, Wong, while alone in the Sanctum, gives shelter to the bitten and turned Doctor Druid. Despite the man's attempt to control his hunger, he kills and devours Wong.

=== Doctor Strange: Season One ===
In the graphic novel Doctor Strange: Season One, Wong is presented as an equal yet headstrong disciple to the Ancient One. When he learns of several relics capable of commanding the powerful Vishanti entities, he ventures out from the monastery to secure them. Before and during this adventure, he mentors Stephen Strange in aspects of self-defense and magical arts. Though he is tempted by the vast power gained by controlling the relics, he willingly gives them up.

=== Strange (2004–2005) ===
In this limited series, Wong is introduced as a young Tibetan boy who was rendered mute after witnessing the slaughter of his family at the age of four. Several years later Stephen Strange, a medical student volunteering in Tibet, fixes his broken arm and lends him a watch. This act of kindness restores his ability to speak. He decides to travel to America and study medicine, where he opens an orthopedic clinic. At some point, he also joins the Ancient One and trains in both magic and martial arts. After injuring his hands, Strange visits his clinic in hope that he can restore full mobility to his hands. There, Strange learns that Wong and Clea are trained mystical warriors serving the Ancient One, working to keep him alive. He joins Clea and the inexperienced Doctor Strange against the assembled forces of Baron Mordo and Dormammu. After the defeat of their enemies, Wong, unsure if it is a 'good thing', willingly takes the position as Strange's servant.

=== Ultimate Marvel ===
Wong also made several appearances in the Ultimate Universe, where he was once again a servant to Doctor Strange, Junior.

== In other media ==
=== Television ===
- Wong appears in Spider-Man: The Animated Series, voiced by George Takei. This version wields two mystically enhanced swords.
- Wong makes non-speaking appearances in The Super Hero Squad Show.

=== Film ===
- Wong appears in Dr. Strange, portrayed by Clyde Kusatsu.
- Wong appears in Doctor Strange: The Sorcerer Supreme, voiced by Paul Nakauchi. This version has a full head of grey hair, is a master sorcerer, and serves as Doctor Strange's mentor.

=== Marvel Cinematic Universe ===
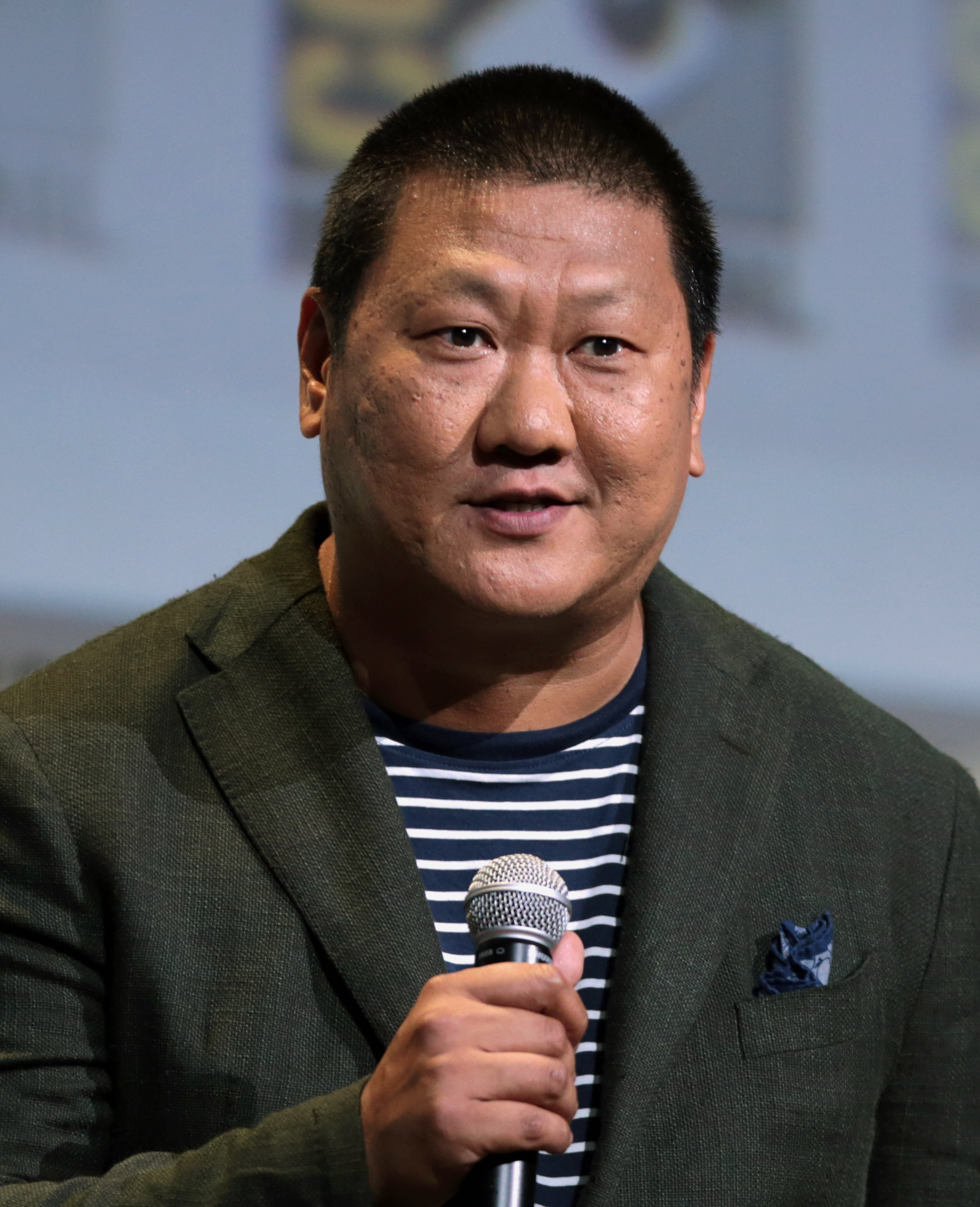
Benedict Wong in 2016

Benedict Wong portrays Wong in media set in the Marvel Cinematic Universe. This version is one of Stephen Strange's teachers rather than a servant as well as the librarian of Kamar-Taj who eventually becomes the Sorcerer Supreme. Additionally, he does not perform any martial arts and is nearly humorless, with this deadpan attitude serving as comic relief. Wong is introduced in the live-action film Doctor Strange (2016), and makes further appearances in the live-action films Avengers: Infinity War (2018), Avengers: Endgame (2019), Shang-Chi and the Legend of the Ten Rings (2021), Spider-Man: No Way Home (2021) and Doctor Strange in the Multiverse of Madness (2022) as well as the live-action Disney+ series She-Hulk: Attorney at Law. Two alternate universe variants of Wong appear in the What If...? episodes "What If... Doctor Strange Lost His Heart Instead of His Hands?" and "What If... the Emergence Destroyed the Earth?", respectively voiced by Benedict Wong and David Chen.

=== Video games ===
- Wong appears as a non-playable character in Marvel: Ultimate Alliance, voiced by Michael Hagiwara.
- Wong appears as a playable character in Marvel Contest of Champions.
- Wong appears as a playable character in Marvel: Future Fight.
- Wong appears as a playable character in Marvel Avengers Academy, voiced by Nicholas Andrew Louie.
- Wong appears as a playable character in Lego Marvel Super Heroes 2, voiced by Dan Li.
