= Ghost Rider (Danny Ketch) =

Marvel Comics fictional character

Danny Ketch Ghost Rider
- Danny Ketch on the cover of Ghost Rider: Danny Ketch #1 (Dec. 2008). Art by Clint Langley.

Publication information
- Publisher: Marvel Comics
- First appearance: Ghost Rider vol. 3 #1 (May 1990)
- Created by: Howard Mackie (writer); Javier Saltares (artist)

In-story information
- Alter ego: Daniel "Danny" Ketch
- Species: Human/demon hybrid
- Place of origin: Brooklyn, New York
- Team affiliations: Midnight Sons; Secret Defenders; New Fantastic Four
- Notable aliases: Spirit of Vengeance; Death Rider
- Abilities: Superhuman strength and durability; Ability to project regular and ethereal flame; Ability to travel between interdimensional realms and along any surface; Using magical chain and motorcycle; Penance Stare

Ghost Rider (Daniel "Danny" Ketch) is a character appearing in American comic books published by Marvel Comics. He is the third Marvel character to don the identity of Ghost Rider, after Johnny Blaze (his brother, the first supernatural Ghost Rider) and the Western hero known as the Phantom Rider, who used the name in 1967.

Danny Ketch made his cinematic debut in the 2011 film Ghost Rider: Spirit of Vengeance, portrayed by Fergus Riordan.

== Publication history ==
Danny Ketch's debut on Ghost Rider (vol. 3) #1 (May 1990). Art by Javier Saltares.

The third Ghost Rider debuted in Ghost Rider vol. 3 #1 (May 1990). The series ended with a cliffhanger in vol. 3 #93 (Feb. 1998). Marvel finally published the belated final issue nine years later as Ghost Rider Finale (Jan. 2007), which reprints vol. 3, #93 and the previously unpublished #94. Ketch later appeared in the Ghost Rider comic book alongside Johnny Blaze. He received his own miniseries titled Ghost Rider: Danny Ketch, written by Simon Spurrier.

== Fictional character biography ==
Daniel Ketch was born in Brooklyn, New York. One night, Daniel and his sister Barbara were attacked by gangsters; with his sister grievously wounded by Deathwatch, Daniel fled and hid in a junkyard, where he found a motorcycle bearing a mystical sigil. Upon touching the sigil, he was transformed into the Ghost Rider. This Ghost Rider was nearly identical to the previous, though his costume and bike had undergone a modernized tailoring. He beat the gangsters, but was unable to save Barbara, who is rendered comatose. Barbara is later killed by Blackout, who becomes Ketch's mortal enemy.

=== Alliances and deaths ===
When Ghost Rider becomes a part of the team the Midnight Sons, he dies twice. The first person who kills him is the vampire hunter Blade, who was at the time possessed by the Darkhold. Ghost Rider is soon revived by the Darkhold Redeemers, along with everyone else killed by Blade. The second time Daniel Ketch was killed was by Zarathos, but, as previously, was resurrected.

Ketch and Johnny Blaze later learn that they are long-lost brothers and that their family has a mystical curse related to the Spirits of Vengeance. Ketch is killed by Blackout, but the Spirit of Vengeance to which he had been bound through the bike's talisman lived on. During this time, Ketch's only existence remained inside a void and he was only able to communicate with Ghost Rider via the spirit world.

When the Fantastic Four are captured by Skrull forces, Ketch joins Spider-Man, Wolverine, and the Hulk in forming the new Fantastic Four.

=== Rebirth ===
In Peter Parker: Spider-Man #93, Ghost Rider is summoned forth on the streets of New York, his powers out of control due to lacking a host. He encounters Spider-Man and Ketch, who tells him that he is Noble Kale even though Ghost Rider denies this, and should be in Mephisto's realm. The trio contend with a bomb created by a group of terrorists who intend to incinerate the city. Although Ghost Rider takes possession of the bomb, he lacks the strength to contain the impending explosion. Ketch rejoins with him to become Ghost Rider once more, and aids Spider-Man in neutralizing the threat. This Ketch/Kale hybrid version of Ghost Rider eventually becomes the King of Hell after killing then-ruler Blackheart.

=== 2000s ===
In the 2008 miniseries Ghost Rider: Danny Ketch, Ketch is tormented that his life has fallen apart due to his family curse and therefore, has the Noble Kale Ghost Rider exorcised from his body by the technomancer Mary LeBow. Ketch falls into a deep alcoholic depression. He is repeatedly approached by Mister Eleven, a talking crow who gives him "doses" of the Ghost Rider power and reveals to him the history of the Spirits of Vengeance and how some past Ghost Riders were unable to cope with the Rider's power, which drove them insane and burned out their souls. Eleven also explains that Verminus Rex, from Blackheart's old Spirit of Vengeance, is hunting other Spirits of Vengeance. Ketch vanquishes Rex, and absorbs the spirits Rex had taken in the past, but this drives Ketch insane. Zadkiel intervenes and absorbs the other Spirits of Vengeance from Ketch's soul, upon which Ketch becomes a knight in Zadkiel's service.

=== 2010s ===
During Absolute Carnage, Johnny Blaze, now the new King of Hell, convinces Ketch to go help another fellow Spirit of Vengeance, Alejandra Jones. In his Ghost Rider form, he arrived at Jones's village and witnesses Carnage kill Jones. Carnage, empowered by Jones' Spirit of Vengeance, battles Jones. Jones, possessing the body of a village girl, and the other villagers help Ketch stop Carnage. Jones thanks Ketch for protecting her village before returning to Hell.

== Powers and abilities ==
Ghost Rider vol. 3, #80 (Feb. 1996), depicting the red-and-orange leather armor. Cover art by Salvador Larroca.

As Ghost Rider, Ketch exhibits much of the same powers as Johnny Blaze; enhanced strength, agility, the ability to generate fire and a resistance to injuries that makes him effectively immortal to all but otherworldly weapons such as those forged in Heaven or Hell. Like Blaze, Ketch can inflict the Penance Stare through eye contact. Uniquely, Ketch has been seen to be able to control the degree of trauma his Stare inflicts; such as when he freed Wolverine from mind control by making him relive the pain and sorrow he inflicted during a single day of his time as a soldier during World War I.

As the Ghost Rider, Ketch uses a length of heavy chain approximately 3 feet (0.91 m) long which possesses magical properties. When thrown, the chain can separate into individual links which behave like shuriken, later reintegrating and returning to Ketch's hand. The chain can grow in length, is supernaturally strong, and can transform into other weapons such as a spear.

When empowered, Ketch's motorcycle undergoes a more radical transformation. It changes from a conventional looking motorcycle to one that appears powerful and high-tech. Along with flaming wheels, the bike includes a shield-like battering ram on the front. The motorcycle can travel faster than a conventional motorcycle and riding straight up vertical surfaces, across water, and through the air.

== Other versions ==
=== Ultimate Marvel ===
An alternate universe version of Danny Ketch appears in the Ultimate Marvel imprint. This version is a spy and a member of the Howling Commandos who possesses a human appearance while transformed and can breathe fire. During the "Cataclysm" storyline, Ketch sacrifices himself to save those infected by MODOK and the Gah Lak Tus virus and destroy the City of Tomorrow. Ketch's consciousness is transferred into a mechanical body, creating Machine Man.

=== Marvel Zombies ===
A zombified alternate universe version of Danny Ketch / Ghost Rider appears in the Marvel Zombies series. In Marvel Zombies 3, Ketch is killed by Machine Man, who steals his motorcycle to evade the zombies.

=== Marvels ===
An alternate universe version of Danny Ketch appears in Marvels. This version is a young paperboy.

=== Spider-Man/Human Torch ===
A young alternate universe version of Danny Ketch appears in Spider-Man/Human Torch.

== In other media ==
=== Television ===
- Danny Ketch / Ghost Rider makes a non-speaking cameo appearance in the X-Men: The Animated Series episode "The Final Decision".
- Danny Ketch / Ghost Rider appears in the Fantastic Four episode "When Calls Galactus", voiced by Richard Grieco.
- Danny Ketch / Ghost Rider appears in The Incredible Hulk episode "Innocent Blood", voiced again by Richard Grieco.
- Danny Ketch / Ghost Rider was intended to appear in Spider-Man: The Animated Series, but was ultimately cut due to objections from Fox.

=== Film ===
Danny Ketch appears in Ghost Rider: Spirit of Vengeance, portrayed by Fergus Riordan. This version is the son of Mephisto/Roarke and possesses innate superpowers.

=== Video games ===
- Danny Ketch / Ghost Rider appears as a guest assist character in Venom/Spider-Man: Separation Anxiety.
- Danny Ketch / Ghost Rider was intended to star in a self-titled video game by Crystal Dynamics prior to its cancellation.

== Bibliography ==
=== Collected editions ===
- Ghost Rider: Resurrected (Ghost Rider vol. 3 #1–7)
- The New Fantastic Four: Monsters Unleashed (Fantastic Four #347–349)
- X-Men & Ghost Rider: Brood Trouble in the Big Easy (Ghost Rider vol. 3 #26–27 and X-Men #8–9)
- Wolverine and Ghost Rider in Acts of Vengeance (Marvel Comics Presents #64-70)
- Rise of the Midnight Sons (Ghost Rider vol. 3 #28, 31; Ghost Rider/Blaze: Spirits of Vengeance #1, Morbius #1, Darkhold #1 and Nightstalkers #1)
- Spirits of Venom (Web of Spider-Man #95–96 and Ghost Rider/Blaze: Spirits of Vengeance #5 – 6)
- Ghost Rider: Danny Ketch – Addict (Ghost Rider: Danny Ketch #1–5; Ghost Rider Finale)
- Ghost Rider: Danny Ketch Classic Vol. 1 (Ghost Rider vol. 3 #1–10)
- Ghost Rider: Danny Ketch Classic Vol. 2 (Ghost Rider vol. 3 #11–20 and Doctor Strange: Sorcerer Supreme #28)
