= Publication history of DC Comics crossover events =

Stories with characters from several series

DC Comics has produced many crossover stories combining characters from different series of comics. Some of these are set in the fictional DC Universe, or any number of settings within the DC Multiverse.

== Publication history ==
=== Pre-Crisis ===
Event	Date	Developments
"Wonder Woman's Invisible Twin"	1953	In Wonder Woman #59, the Golden Age Wonder Woman meets her counterpart in a parallel world, later designated Earth-59, introducing the concept of the DC Multiverse. (Note: Wonder Woman #59) Diana's counterpart is Princess Tara Terruna, which translates into the titular "Wonder Woman" of her world. Together, they defeat the evil Duke Dazam. Tara refers to Diana and herself as "reflections in a mirror," leading Diana to conclude: "Earth must have a twin world, existing simultaneously alongside it! But developing differently! And everyone on it is a double of everyone on Earth! The electrical storm somehow hurled me from my world into yours!" The accompanying artwork by H. G. Peter depicting the famous "twin Earths" imagery that would later be associated with DC's concept of the Multiverse. The story is credited to Robert Kanigher who used the pseudonym of "Charles Moulton" as an in-house author name following the death of William Moulton Marston, the original author of Wonder Woman. H. G. Peter, the original artist for Wonder Woman, is credited with this story's artwork but had a team of assistants aiding him in his final years on the magazine, most of whom remain unknown.
"Flash of Two Worlds"	1961	The Silver Age Flash (Barry Allen) meets his Golden Age hero Jay Garrick. Previously believed to be the story that introduced the concept of the DC Multiverse, but it nevertheless started the almost annual crossover between Earth-One characters and Earth-Two characters. (Note: The Flash #123): The Flash #129 is a sequel to this story, some references are made to the Justice Society of America.
"Vengeance of the Immortal Villain!"	1963	Properly re-introduces the Justice Society of America. (Note: The Flash #137)
"Crisis on Earth-One!" and "Crisis on Earth-Two!"	1963	The Silver Age Justice League of America meet the Golden Age Justice Society of America, beginning an annual team-up tradition between the two teams and starting a legacy of DC Crisis events. (Note: Justice League of America #21-22)
"Crisis on Earth-Three"	1964	Introduces the Crime Syndicate of America of Earth-Three. (Note: Justice League of America #29)
JLA: Zatanna's Search	1964	Zatanna attempts to reconnect with her father, Zatara, and seeks the aid of Hawkman, Batman, Robin, the Atom, Green Lantern and the Elongated Man along the way. (Note: Hawkman #4 - "The Girl Who Split in Two!", Detective Comics #336 - "Batman's Bewitched Nightmare", The Atom #19 - "World of the Magic Atom", Green Lantern (vol. 2) #42 - "The Other Side of The World!", Detective Comics #355 - "The Tantalizing Troubles of the Tripod Thieves", Justice League of America #51 - "Z -- As in Zatanna-- and Zero Hour!", and DC Special Blue Ribbon Digest #5 - "The Secret Spell" Between Hawkman, Detective Comics, The Atom, Green Lantern (vol. 2), Detective Comics and Justice League of America)
Green Lantern #40: "Secret Origin of the Guardians!"	1965	Silver Age Green Lantern teams up with his Golden Age predecessor; and Krona, who created the DC Multiverse, appears for the first time. (Note: Green Lantern #40)
Green Lantern/Green Arrow: Snowbirds Don't Fly	1971	Oliver Queen and Hal Jordan must deal with the shocking revelation that the former's ward, Roy Harper has become a drug addict and do what they must to help him. (Note: Green Lantern/Green Arrow #85 - "Snowbirds Don't Fly; The Strange Trial of Green Lantern!", Green Lantern/Green Arrow #86 - "They Say It'll Kill Me... But They Won't Say When")
Showcase #100	1978	In issue #100 of the Showcase comics, "There Shall Come a Gathering", many of the heroes who previously appeared in the comic's original run must stop an alien from towing Earth out of its orbit. Some of those who appear include the Challengers of the Unknown, Lois Lane, the Teen Titans, Rip Hunter, the Spectre, the Metal Men and the Inferior Five, along with cameos by others.
Crisis on Earth Prime	1982	Per Degaton threatens Earth Prime, so the Justice League of America, the Justice Society of America, and the All-Star Squadron must team up to stop the threat. (Note: All-Star Squadron #14 - "The "Mystery Men" of October!", Justice League of America #207 - "Crisis Times Three!", All-Star Squadron #15 - "Master of Worlds and Time! / Fate is the Killer", Justice League of America #208 - "The Bomb-Blast Heard 'Round the World!", Justice League of America #209 - "Let Old Acquaintances Be Forgot...")
"Superman: Whatever Happened to the Man of Tomorrow?"	1986	In the final adventure of Superman before Crisis on Infinite Earths, the Man of Steel must face his most dangerous foes one last time. (Note: Superman #423; Action Comics #583)
**Crisis on Infinite Earths**	1985-1986	The Anti-Monitor tries to destroy the DC Multiverse, but only succeeds in merging it into a single universe; numerous characters die, including Supergirl (Kara Zor-El) and the Flash (Barry Allen). (Note: Action Comics #560, 564; All-Star Squadron #40, 50-60; Amethyst #2, 13; Batman #384, 389-391; Batman and the Outsiders #14-15; Blue Devil #5, 17-19; DC Comics Presents #76, 78, 86–88, 94-95; Detective Comics #551, 555-558; The Flash #338-339; The Fury of Firestorm the Nuclear Man #28, 41-42; G.I. Combat #274-275; Green Lantern #173, 176, 178, 194-198; Infinity Inc. #8, 18–25, Annual #1; Jonah Hex #90; Justice League of America #232, 234, 244–245, Annual #3; The New Teen Titans #13-15, #21, Annual #2; The Saga of the Swamp Thing (vol. 2) #30-31; Superman #402-403, 413-415; Tales of the Legion of Super-Heroes #317, 319-320; Tales of the Teen Titans #47, 58; Vigilante #14, 22; Warlord #91, 97; Wonder Woman #321, 323, 327-329; World's Finest Comics #311, 314; The Legend of Wonder Woman #1-4; Legion of Super-Heroes #13-18, Annual #1; The Losers Special #1; The Omega Men #26, 31-33; Swamp Thing (vol. 2) #39-46; Captain Carrot and His Amazing Zoo Crew! in The Oz-Wonderland War #3; Legends of the DCU: Crisis on Infinite Earths #1; Crisis on Infinite Earths #1-12; DCU: Legacies #5-6; Deadman: Dead Again #1; JLA: Incarnations #5; Comics Values Monthly #95) Series to spin out of event: The Man of Steel (#1-6); The Green Lantern Corps (#206-224)

=== Post-Crisis ===
Event	Date	Developments
**Legends**	1986	Darkseid and his servant Glorious Godfrey attempt to ruin humanity's faith in superheroes. First post-Crisis appearance of Captain Marvel in normal continuity and the forming of a new Justice League roster. JLA: Incarnations #5; Legends of the DC Universe 3-D Gallery #1; Justice League #1; Suicide Squad #1 Series to spin out of event: Suicide Squad (#1-66); Justice League (#1-6); Justice League International (#7-25); Justice League America (#26-113)
**Millennium**	1988	After the Guardians and Zamarons exile themselves from this dimension, one of each remains and seeks out 12 Chosen to become the New Guardians. The robotic Manhunters aim to prevent this and several supporting characters are revealed to be Manhunters. Series to spin out of event: Manhunter, vol. 1 (#1-24); The New Guardians (#1-12)
**Invasion!**	1988	The Dominators have put together an alliance to invade Earth and eliminate the threat posed by metahumans. (Note: Invasion #1-3; The Adventures of Superman #449-450; Animal Man #6-7; Blasters Special #1; Captain Atom #24-25; Checkmate #11-12; Daily Planet #1; Detective Comics #595; Doom Patrol #17-18; Firestorm the Nuclear Man #80-81; The Flash (vol. 2) #21-22; Invasion Special: Daily Planet #1; Justice League International #22-23; L.E.G.I.O.N. '89 #1; Manhunter #8-9; The New Guardians #6-7; Power of the Atom #7-8; The Spectre #23; Starman #5-6; Suicide Squad #23; Superman #26-27; Swamp Thing (vol. 2) #80-81; Wonder Woman (vol. 2) #25-26) Series to spin out of event: L.E.G.I.O.N. (#1-70)
**Cosmic Odyssey**	1988-1989	Darkseid strives to gain the Anti-Life Equation. Series to spin out of event: New Gods (#1-28)
Suicide Squad: The Janus Directive	1989	Suicide Squad leader Amanda Waller sends her agents on missions in the apparent pursuit of her own private agenda, the so-called "Janus Directive".
Batman: A Lonely Place of Dying	1989	Following the tragic events of A Death in the Family, Batman begins making reckless decisions. Dick Grayson and another must work to bring Batman back from the edge. (Note: Batman #440 - "A Lonely Place of Dying Part 1: Suspects", The New Titans #60 - "A Lonely Place of Dying Part 2", Batman #441 - "A Lonely Place of Dying Chapter Three: Parallel Lines!", The New Titans #61 - "A Lonely Place of Dying Part 4", Batman #442 - "A Lonely Place of Dying: Reborn")
**Armageddon 2001**	1991	Monarch threatens to destroy the future and Earth's superheroes must stop him. Limited series with crossovers in the 1991 DC Annuals.
**War of the Gods**	1991	Wonder Woman and the Amazons are caught in the middle of a war between the ancient Roman gods and the Olympian gods. Meanwhile, Circe frames Themyscira for crimes that leads to a war between America and Wonder Woman's home. (Note: War of the Gods #1-4; Animal Man #40; Batman #470; Captain Atom #56-57; The Demon #17; Doctor Fate #32-33; The Flash (vol. 2) #55; Hawk and Dove #28; Hawkworld #15-16; Justice League America #55; Justice League Europe #31; L.E.G.I.O.N. '91 #31; The New Titans #81; Starman #38; Suicide Squad #58; Superman: The Man of Steel #3; Wonder Woman (vol. 2) #58-61)
Justice League: Breakdowns	1991-1992	A 16-issue crossover between Justice League America #53-60 and Justice League Europe #29-36, changing the tone of both series from a humorous one to a more serious one. Green Lantern (vol. 3) #18
**Eclipso: The Darkness Within**	1992	Earth's superheroes fight Eclipso and his pawn Lar Gand. Limited series with crossovers in the 1992 DC Annuals.: Eclipso (#1-18)
Superman: Panic in the Sky	1992	
The Death of Superman	1992	
Trinity	1993	The Green Lantern Corps, the L.E.G.I.O.N., and the Darkstars go up against the beings called "the Triarch".
Batman: Knightfall	1993	Bruce Wayne (Batman) suffers burnout and is systematically assaulted and crippled by a Venom-enhanced villain named Bane. Wayne is replaced as Batman by an apprentice named Jean-Paul Valley, who becomes increasingly violent and unstable, tarnishing Batman's reputation. Eventually, Wayne is healed through paranormal means and reclaims his role as Batman.: Prodigal (1994): In the aftermath of Knightfall, Batman hands over the cowl to Dick Grayson. (Note: Batman #512 - "Prodigal Part 1: Robin and Batman", Batman: Shadow of the Bat #32 - "Falls Upon Prodigal: Part Two", Detective Comics #679 - "Prodigal Three : The Vermin Factor", Robin (vol. 2) #11 - Prodigal, "Part 4: Two in Every Crowd", Batman #513 - "Prodigal 5: Double Deuce", Batman: Shadow of the Bat #33 - "Falls Upon Prodigal: Part Six", Detective Comics #680 - "Prodigal Seven : A Twice-Told Tale", Robin #12 - "Prodigal, Part 8: Bullies", Batman #514 - "Prodigal 9: One Night in the War Zone", Batman: Shadow of the Bat #34 - "Falls Upon; Prodigal: Part Ten", Detective Comics #681 - "Prodigal Eleven: Knight Without Armor", Robin (vol. 2) #13 - "Prodigal, Conclusion: Wings Over Gotham", Nightwing: "Alfred's Return #1 - The Britannia Coup", Batman: "Prodigal #1 - Prodigal")
**Bloodlines**	1993	The DC superheroes go up against alien parasites; new superheroes are created from some of their victims. Limited series with crossovers in the 1993 DC Annuals.
End of an Era	1994	High above New Earth, the teenage Legionnaires from Batch SW6 prevent the Time Trapper from destroying the domed cities. They are shocked to learn that the Trapper is a future version of Cosmic Boy.
Superman: Fall of Metropolis (AKA Worlds Collide)	1994	With the Man of Steel out of commission due to injuries, LexCorp and Project Cadmus' conflict spills over into the city streets. If Superman does not recover in time, this may spell doom for Metropolis. (Note: Action Comics #699 - "Eye of the Hurricane", Superman: The Man of Steel #34 - "War / The Call", The Adventures of Superman #513 - "Target: Cadmus", Action Comics #700 - "Swan Song", Superman (vol. 2) #90 - "Battle Ground Metropolis", Superman: The Man of Steel #35 - "Afterburn", The Adventures of Superman #514 - "Dangerous Visions", Action Comics #701 - "Final Conflict", Superman (vol. 2) #91 - "My Life!" Wonder Woman (vol. 2) #88 - "Dead Again") Crossover of 14 comics spanning Superman: The Man of Steel, Hardware, Superboy (vol. 4), Icon, Steel (vol. 2), Blood Syndicate, and Static.
**Zero Hour: Crisis in Time!**	1994	Extant and Parallax attempt to recreate the Multiverse; a new timeline emerges. Crossover involving 45 issues/titles across the DC Universe, followed up in October by Zero Month (31 titles) which kicks off the new timeline.
The Way of the Warrior	1995	The Tormock alien race invades Earth and Guy Gardner, Hawkman, Justice League America, Lobo and former Green Lantern Probert battle to save the world. (Note: Justice League America #101 - "Pressure Cooker", Hawkman (vol. 3) #22 - "Storm Over Thanagar", Guy Gardner: Warrior #32 - "Give me a Space to Call My Own", Justice League America #102 - "Breakout!", Hawkman (vol. 3) #23 - "Essential Warfare", Guy Gardner: Warrior #33 - "Into the Valley of Death", Guy Gardner: Warrior #34 - "Deathrock: Justice is Coming!")
**Underworld Unleashed**	1995	Neron, a demon-lord from Hell, offers the DC universe villains "upgrades" in exchange for their souls. (Note: Underworld Unleashed #1-3; Underworld Unleashed: Abyss--Hell's Sentinel #1; Underworld Unleashed: Apokolips--Dark Uprising #1; Underworld Unleashed: Bathan Devil's Asylum #1; Underworld Unleashed: Patterns of Fear #1; The Adventures of Superman #530; Aquaman (vol. 5) #14; Azrael #10; Batman #525; Catwoman (vol. 2) #27; Damage #18-19; Detective Comics #691-692; Extreme Justice #10-11; Fate #13-14; The Flash (vol. 2) #107; Green Arrow (vol. 2) #102-103; Green Lantern (vol. 3) #68-69; Guy Gardner, Warrior #36-37; Hawkman (vol. 3) #26-27; Impulse #8-9; Justice League America #105-106; Justice League Task Force #30; Legion of Super-Heroes (vol. 4) #75; Legionnaires #32; Lobo #22; Manhunter #11-12; Primal Force #13-14; R.E.B.E.L.S. '95 #13-14; The Ray (vol. 2) #18-19; Robin (vol. 2) #23-24; Showcase '95 #12; The Spectre (vol 3) #35-36; Starman (vol. 2) #13; Steel (vol. 2) #2; Superboy (vol. 4) #20, #22; Superman: The Man of Tomorrow #3)
Batman: Troika	1995	A 4-comic Batman crossover in February 1995: Batman #515, Batman: Shadow of the Bat #35, Detective Comics #682 and Robin (vol. 2) #14
The Death of Clark Kent	1995	An 8-comic Superman titles crossover starting in May 1995: Superman (vol. 2) #100-101, The Adventures of Superman #522-523, Action Comics #710-711, and Superman: The Man of Steel #45-46
The Trial of Superman	1995	A 12-comic Superman titles crossover starting in November 1995: Superman: The Man of Steel #50-52, Superman (vol. 2) #106-108, The Adventures of Superman #529-531, Action Comics #716-717, and Superman: The Man of Tomorrow #3
The Flash: Dead Heat	1995	A new villain comes to town. His knowledge of the Speed Force rivals that of Wally West, and now he has put the entire team in peril. (Note: The Flash (vol. 2) #108 - "Dead Heat, First Lap: Flatfooted", Impulse #10 - "Dead Heat, Third Lap: Disaffected Youth", The Flash (vol. 2) #109 - "Dead Heat Part 2 of 6", Impulse #11 - "Dead Heat, Fifth Lap: Breaking the Barrier", The Flash (vol. 2) #110 - "Dead Heat Part 4 of 6", The Flash (vol. 2) #111 - "Dead Heat: Finale")
Siege of the Zi Charam	1995	Can even the combined might of Supergirl and Green Lantern rescue the New Titans from the clutches of the deadly Progenitors.: 1. The New Titans #124 - "Prometheus Gathering"; 2. Green Lantern (vol. 3) #65 - "Rescue"; 3. Darkstars #34 - "Strangers in a Strange land" 4. Damage #16 - "The Elements of Power"; 5. The New Titans #125 - "Xenocide"
**The Final Night**	1996	A Sun-Eater threatens life on Earth by devouring the Sun. Hal Jordan sacrifices his life to destroy it.
Batman: Contagion	1996	Beginning in March 1996, this Batman crossover involves a virulent strain of ebola sweeping across Gotham City, forcing Azrael, Batman, Catwoman, Huntress, Nightwing, and Robin to deal with a threat they cannot see: 1. Batman: Shadow of the Bat #48-49 - "The Apocalypse Plague" and "Angel of Death"; 2. Detective Comics #695-696 - "The Gray Area" and "Babylon Falls"; 3. Robin (vol. 2) #27-28 - "Natural Born Healer" and "Bitter Dregs"; 4. Catwoman (vol. 2) #31-32 - "Flesh and Fire" and "Fever Pitch"; 5. Azrael #15-16 - "Requiem for an Immortal" and "Contagion"; 6. Batman #529 - "Tears of Blood"; 7. Batman Chronicles #4 - "Hitman", "Huntress: Exposure", and "Beggar's Banquet"
Batman: Legacy	1996	A sequel to Contagion, this 10-part crossover starting in August 1996 follows a new strand of the Apocalypse Virus, controlled by Ra's al Ghul who attempts to find a suitable father for his grandchildren: Batman: Shadow of the Bat #53-54, Batman #533-534, Detective Comics #700-702, Catwoman (vol. 2) #36, and Robin (vol. 2) #32-33.
**Genesis**	1997	Darkseid battles Earth's heroes when the Genesis Wave strikes; many superbeings have their powers altered or negated.
Brotherhood of the Fist	1998	The story centers around a mysterious organization called the Brotherhood of the Fist. This group of elite martial artists declares war on all the greatest hand-to-hand combatants in the DC Universe. This includes heroes like Green Arrow, Nightwing, Robin, and Batman. A 5-issue DC Crossover starting in July 1998 involving Green Arrow (vol. 2) #134-135, Detective Comics #723, Robin (vol. 2) #55, and Nightwing (vol. 2) #23
Batman: Cataclysm	1998	The plot of the storyline centers on Gotham City being hit by a massive earthquake, the epicenter of which is less than a mile from Wayne Manor. In the wake of the destruction, Batman and his allies assist in rescue efforts around the city, which soon spirals into chaos.: Batman: Aftershock (June 1998): The "Aftershock" event itself dealt with the aftermath of a devastating earthquake that struck Gotham City. Spawned 16 issues from Batman #555-559, Detective Comics #722-726, Batman: Shadow of the Bat #75-79, The Batman Chronicles #14 and ending with Robin (vol. 2) #54.; Batman: Road to No Man's Land (December 1998): "Road to No Man's Land" stories delved into the fallout of a catastrophic earthquake that ripped through Gotham City. These stories showcased the city's fight for survival in the face of immense hardship, exploring themes of social unrest, governmental failures, and the rise of opportunistic criminals. Spawned 12 issues from Azrael: Agent of the Bat #47-49, Batman #560-562, Batman: Shadow of the Bat #80-82, and Detective Comics #727-729; Batman: No Man's Land (March 1999): This volume covers the period following the earthquake, from the evacuation of the city until its time of re-opening and the beginning of rebuilding. Covers 88 issues.
**DC One Million**	1998	The Justice Legion Alpha of the 853rd century joins with the present day Justice League to battle Solaris.
Superman: Behold! The Millennium Giants!	1998	A trio of colossal giants are out to remake the world and it is up to Superman and friends to stop them. The storyline ran through several titles, though mostly through the Superman books. The end of this story arc was the lead-in for Superman Forever #1, which coincided with Superman's 60th anniversary. (Note: Superman: The Man of Steel #78; Aquaman (vol. 5) #43; Challengers of the Unknown (vol. 3) #15; Superman (vol. 2) #134; Supergirl (vol. 4) #20; Teen Titans (vol. 2) #19; The Adventures of Superman #557; Steel (vol. 2) #50; Action Comics #744; Superman: The Man of Steel #79; Superman (vol. 2) #135; Team Superman Secret Files and Origins #1; Superman Forever #1)
JLA/Titans: The Technis Imperative	1999	A powerful technological threat from space targets members of the Teen Titans past and current, and the Titans and JLA are divided on how to fight it.
**Day of Judgment**	1999	Demonic forces threaten the Earth; Hal Jordan becomes the Spectre. 21 issues spanning 14 comic series.
**JLApe: Gorilla Warfare!**	1999	The apes of Gorilla City have declared open hostility on the rest of the world by using technology that can turn humans into apes.
The Flash: Chain Lightning	1999	Speedsters of all eras between now and the 30th century team up to stop a threat to the Flash dynasty. (Note: The Flash (vol. 2) #145 - "Chain Lightning Chapter One: The Gathering Storm", The Flash (vol. 2) #146 - "Chain Lightning Chapter Two: Time Like a River", Impulse #46 - "When Barry Met Bart", The Flash (vol. 2) #147 - "Chain Lightning Chapter Three: Shooting the Rapids", The Flash (vol. 2) #148 - "Chain Lightning Chapter Four: Undertow", The Flash (vol. 2) #149 - "Chain Lightning Chapter Five: Whirlpool", The Flash (vol. 2) #150 - "Chain Lightning Finale: Finish Line")
Batman: Evolution	2000	A 9-issue story-arc in Detective Comics #742 through #750
Sins of Youth	2000	A Young Justice-centric event where most teen superheroes become adults, and most adult superheroes become younger (usually teens, although the JSA became small children).
Superman: Emperor Joker	2000	A DC Comics story that throws the world into chaos as the Joker acquires god-like powers and rewrites reality according to his own twisted desires. Superman, the Man of Steel, is no longer the beacon of hope and justice. Instead, he becomes a dangerous criminal loose in Gotham City. With Superman out of commission, the only one who can resist the Joker's mad world is Bizarro, a bizarre and imperfect clone of Superman with backwards powers and a child-like mind. A 9-issue Superman titles crossover beginning in October: Superman (vol. 2) #160-161, The Adventures of Superman #582-583, Superman: The Man of Steel #104-105, and Action Comics #769-770
Superboy: The Evil Factory	2000	The Agenda is manipulating DNA for nefarious purposes. What can Superboy do to stop them? (Note: Superboy (vol. 4) #70 - "The Evil Factory Part 1: Evil Factory!", Superboy (vol. 4) #71 - "The Evil Factory Part 2: Prisoners of the Project!", Superboy (vol. 4) #72 - "The Evil Factory Part 3: The Hex Files", Superboy (vol. 4) #73 - "The Evil Factory Part 4: Point of No Return!", Young Justice: Sins of Youth #1 - "Justice For All", Superboy (vol. 4) #74 - "The Evil Factory Part 5: Game, Set & Match!")
Batman: Officer Down	2001	An 8-issue Batman titles crossover where Commissioner Gordon is shot starting in March 2000: Batman #587, Robin (vol. 2) #86, Birds of Prey #27, Catwoman (vol. 2) #90, Batgirl #12, Nightwing (vol. 2) #53, Detective Comics #754 and Gotham Knights #13.
Superman: Return to Krypton	2001	A 9-issue, non-consecutive, Superman titles crossover beginning in March: Superman (vol. 2) (166, 167, 184) The Adventures of Superman (589, 606) Superman: The Man of Steel (111, 128), and Action Comics (776, 793)
Our Worlds at War	2001	The heroes of the DC Universe face the threat of the cosmic force known as Imperiex, who has attacked Earth. 43 issues across multiple DC titles.
Superman: President Lex	2001	A 12-issue Superman titles crossover starting in June: Action Comics #773, The Adventures of Superman #581-586, Superman (vol. 2) #51-54, Superman: The Man of Steel #108-110 as well as a few standalone issues; President Luthor Secret Files and Origins and Lex 2000
Joker: Last Laugh	2001–2002	While locked up in the Slab penitentiary, the Joker finds out that he is suffering from a terminal brain tumor. Determined to go out with a bang, he uses a special Joker venom to "jokerize" the other inmates, making them insane and giving them white skin, red lips, green hair and a wide smile.
Bruce Wayne: Fugitive	2002	Bruce Wayne finds his girlfriend, Vesper Fairchild, dead in Wayne Manor just as the police arrive. The Batman Family investigates the circumstances of the crime.
World Without Young Justice	2002	An all-new Young Justice has one mission: save Jason Todd. (Note: Young Justice #44 - "World Without Young Justice Part 1: The World What Once We Knew", Impulse #85 - "World Without Young Justice Part 2: Glimpses of You!", Robin (vol. 2) #101 - "World Without Young Justice Part 3: Redone by the Vandal(s) of Time", Superboy (vol. 4) #99 - "World Without Young Justice Part 4: Doomsboy", Young Justice #45 - "World Without Young Justice Part 5: Bang Bang Bedlam's Purple Hammer")
Superman: Ending Battle	2002	An 8-issue Superman titles crossover starting in November: Superman (vol. 2) #186-187, The Adventures of Superman #608-609, Superman: The Man of Steel #130-131, and Action Comics #795-796
JSA: Black Reign	2003	A crossover between the Justice Society of America and Hawkman. (Note: JSA #56-58; Hawkman (vol. 4) #23-25)
Batman: War Drums	2003	A 10-issue Batman titles crossover starting in March: Detective Comics #790-796, and Robin (vol. 2) #126-128
Batman: War Games	2004	A 27-issue Batman titles crossover starting in June involving Batman, Detective Comics, Batman: Legends of the Dark Knight, Nightwing (vol. 2), Gotham Knights, Robin (vol. 2), Batgirl, and Catwoman (vol. 2).
**Identity Crisis**	2004	Sue Dibny, the wife of superhero the Elongated Man, is murdered in their apartment. The DC superhero community rallies to find the murderer, uncovering shocking truths about Doctor Light and Batman's reasoning for creating countermeasures for the Justice League. (Note: Identity Crisis #1-7; The Adventures of Superman #636, 644; Firestorm (vol. 3) #6; The Flash (vol. 2) #214-217; JSA #67; Manhunter (vol. 3) #5; Teen Titans (vol. 3) #20-23; JLA #115-119; Green Arrow (vol. 3) #52, 54-57) 22 issues across The Flash, Manhunter, Firestorm, and JSA.
**Infinite Crisis**	2005	Kal-L, the Superman of Earth-Two, Superboy-Prime and several other characters return to attempt to change the universe for the better. Prime believes he is the one true Superman, and history is altered at the end of the series. 104 issues across multiple DC titles and one-shot issues ending in a 6-issue run of Crisis Aftermath: Battle for Bludhaven.: Countdown to Infinite Crisis (September 2004): Consists of the one-shot Countdown to Infinite Crisis and four miniseries which spun out of this comic: Day of Vengeance, in which the Shadowpact is formed to defend magic from the Spectre; Rann-Thanagar War; Villains United, in which the Secret Six is formed to fight the Secret Society of Super-Villains; and The OMAC Project, in which Batman's mistrust of his fellow heroes leads to the creation of an army of cyborgs. 251 issues in the full reading order.; **52** (2006): The "missing year" between Infinite Crisis and One Year Later where the world is without Superman, Batman and Wonder Woman. The series establishes the existence of a new Multiverse.; **One Year Later** (2006): All DC comics jump forward in time to one year after the end of Infinite Crisis. Diana gains a secret identity of Diana Prince and reclaims the Wonder Woman mantle, Bruce Wayne resumes the mantle of Batman and Clark Kent gets his powers back and returns as Superman. (Note: Blood of the Demon #13-15; Brave New World #1; The All-New Atom #1-6; The Creeper (vol. 2) #1-6; Ion #1-12; Martian Manhunter (vol. 3) #1-8; OMAC #1-8; The Trials of Shazam! #1-12)
Seven Soldiers	2005	A 30-issue arc across multiple titles reviving Golden Era Heroes such as Shining Knight, Manhattan Guardian, Zatanna, Klarion the Witch Boy, Mister Miracle, Bulleteer, Frankenstein and their super-team: the Seven Soldiers of Victory, also known as the Law's Legionnaries and the All-Star Squadron.
Superman: Up Up and Away	2006	An 8-issue Superman titles crossover starting in June: Superman #650-653, and Action Comics #837-840
Amazons Attack	2007	Led up with Wonder Woman (vol. 3) #6-8, Circe manipulates the Department of Metahuman Affairs and the Amazons after bringing Queen Hippolyta, Wonder Woman's mother, back from the dead, which leads the Amazons to fight America and the country's heroes. The only way Wonder Woman can end this war, besides defeating Circe, is by fighting her own mother.
Sinestro Corps War	2007	The story centers on the Green Lanterns of Earth (Hal Jordan, Kyle Rayner, John Stewart and Guy Gardner) and the rest of the Green Lantern Corps as they fight an interstellar war against the Sinestro Corps, an army led by Sinestro who seek to create a universe ruled through fear. This involves recruiting the Anti-Monitor, the Cyborg Superman, and Superboy-Prime to aid in the destruction of the Green Lantern Corps.
**Final Crisis**	2008	The event that started at the conclusion of Countdown to Final Crisis. Started May 2008. Darkseid arrives on Earth and begins a conquest to overthrow reality, as part of a plan by Libra to conquer the Multiverse. The Justice League and Green Lantern Corps join forces in a desperate attempt to stop the upcoming onslaught. Batman is apparently killed by Darkseid in this event. In reality, he is trapped in the past, where he witnessed Anthro's death. Martian Manhunter is murdered by Libra and the new Secret Society of Super-Villains. Barry Allen, who died in Crisis on Infinite Earths, returns to life in this event.: Death of the New Gods (2007): was conceived by DC as a series that would lead- and tie-in to Final Crisis. Is an eight-issue comic book limited series published in 2007 and 2008.; Countdown to Final Crisis (2007): A weekly series that started a week following the end of 52, Countdown to Final Crisis acts as the "spine" to the DC Universe that, as the name suggests, counts down to a new event for 2008. The series crosses over with certain titles and deals with Jimmy Olsen getting superpowers, Mary Marvel trying to get her powers back, and a plot with the Monitors that involves the new Multiverse and the three characters that were supposed to die in Infinite Crisis: Jason Todd, Donna Troy, and Kyle Rayner. This also features the return of Superboy-Prime from Infinite Crisis.
**Blackest Night**	2009	An all-out war between the living heroes and villains and the Black Lantern Corps and the DC Universe stemming from the War of Light.: **Brightest Day** (2010): The events immediately following Blackest Night.; Brightest Day Aftermath: The Search for Swamp Thing miniseries: A continuation of the Brightest Day storyline. Re-introduces the Swamp Thing and John Constantine back into the DC universe proper.
Superman: New Krypton	2009	Superman comes to terms with the death of his adoptive father Jonathan Kent while also dealing with 100,000 Kryptonians now living on Earth as a result of the Brainiac story arc.
Justice League: Rise and Fall	2010	Following the stunning conclusion to JUSTICE LEAGUE: CRY FOR JUSTICE what controversial decision has created a split in the League? A new meaning to the term 'hunt for justice' creates fear in the villain populace. Justice League Cry for Justice #1-7 (prelude); Titans (vol. 2) #23 (prelude); Justice League Rise and Fall Special #1; Green Arrow and Black Canary #31-32; Justice League of America (vol. 2) #43; Justice League: Rise of Arsenal #1-4
Batman: The Return of Bruce Wayne	2010	Bruce Wayne returns to present-day Gotham City after the events of Final Crisis.
Reign of Doomsday	2011	Doomsday hunts down Steel, Superboy, the Eradicator, and the Cyborg Superman.
**Flashpoint**	2011	When the Flash attempts to change time and save his mother from death, he alters history dramatically. When the events are corrected, universes are joined (one being the Wildstorm universe/imprint bringing the team of the Authority back into DC) in order to repair the damage, leading to The New 52.

=== Post-Flashpoint ===
Event	Date	Developments
**The New 52**	2011	In the aftermath of Flashpoint, the DC Universe has a new status quo with all their comics.
I, Vampire: Rise of the Vampires	2012	Andrew Bennett is dead, and with his death, Cain, the sire of all vampires, has risen in Gotham, leaving it up to the Justice League Dark to attempt to retrieve Andrew from the realm of the dead in order to seal away Cain once again. (Note: Justice League Dark #6 - "Bloody Reunion", I, Vampire #6 - "This Charming Man", Justice League Dark #7 - "Red Blood, Dark Magic", I, Vampire #7 - "Blame it on Cain", Justice League Dark #8 - "The Leaving", I, Vampire #8 - "Cruel to be Kind")
Batman: Night of the Owls	2012	Batman must call upon the Bat-Family Jason Todd, Dick Grayson, Tim Drake, Damian Wayne, Catwoman, etc., for the shadowy group "the Court of Owls" are vying to keep their century-long control over Gotham City.
The Culling: Rise of the Ravagers	2012	The Teen Titans, with the help of the Legion of Super-Heroes, face off against the metahuman-capturing group N.O.W.H.E.R.E., just as N.O.W.H.E.R.E's leader, Harvest, sets his long-awaited plan in motion.
Green Lantern: Rise of the Third Army	2012–2013	Absolute power corrupts absolutely—and the Guardians' time is finally here. The Guardians, believing that the universe would be better off without free will and emotions, create the Third Army. The Third Army assimilates all they come in contact with into transformed members of the Third Army. This storyline leads into the Wrath of the First Lanternstoryline. Green Lantern (vol. 5) #0, 13–16, Annual #1; Green Lantern Corps (vol. 3) #13-16, Annual #1; Green Lantern: New Guardians #0, 13–16; Red Lanterns #13-16: Wrath of the First Lantern (February–May 2013): In the outcome of Rise of the Third Army, the mysterious First Lantern is unleashed against the Green Lantern Corps. (Note: Green Lantern (vol. 5) #17-20; Green Lantern Corps (vol. 3) #17-20; Green Lantern: New Guardians #17-20; Red Lanterns #17-20) (Note: Collected Edition - ISBN 978-1401246938)
Rotworld	August 2012–February 2013	The avatars of the Green (the Swamp Thing) and the Red (Animal Man) must stop the Rot or the world will end in this epic crossover. (Note: Animal Man (vol. 2) #12 - "Prologue, Part One", Swamp Thing (vol. 5) #12 - "Prologue, Part Two", Animal Man (vol. 2) #13 - "The Red Kingdom, Part One", Frankenstein, Agent of S.H.A.D.E. #13 - "Secrets of the Dead: Victor's Spoils", Swamp Thing (vol. 5) #13 - "The Green Kingdom, Part One", Swamp Thing (vol. 5) Annual #1 - "The Hidden", Animal Man (vol. 5) #14 - "The Red Kingdom, Part Two", Frankenstein, Agent of S.H.A.D.E. #14 - "Secrets of the Dead: Who's That Trip-Trapping Over My Bridge?", Swamp Thing (vol. 5) #14 - "The Green Kingdom, Part Two", Animal Man (vol. 2) #15 - "The Red Kingdom, Part Three", Frankenstein, Agent of S.H.A.D.E. #15, Animal Man (vol. 2) #16-18, Swamp Thing (vol. 5) #16-18)
Hawkman: Wanted	2012–2013	Hawkman is being chased after by the Thanagarians, crossing the paths of both Green Arrow and Deathstroke. (Note: The Savage Hawkman #13; Green Arrow (vol. 5) #14; Deathstroke (vol. 2) #14; The Savage Hawkman #14-16)
The Black Diamond Probability	2012–2013	The Black Diamond Probability concerns stories which involve the Black Diamond, most often associated with the villain Eclipso. (Note: Demon Knights #13-15; All-Star Western #13-16; Team 7 #1-4; Catwoman (vol. 4) #15-16; Sword of Sorcery #6-8)
Batman: Death of the Family	2012–2013	After having the skin of his face cut off of his head, the Joker returns and begins to target the Bat-Family.
Superman: H'El on Earth	2012–2013	A New 52 Superman crossover where Superman, Superboy and Supergirl go head to head with a powerful Kryptonian being known as H'el, Superman's adopted brother.: **Krypton Returns** (September–November 2013): After the events of H'El on Earth, H'El has been sent to the time period of Krypton's destruction and plans to change history, so Superman and his allies travel to the past in order to stop him. Krypton Returns also links into Scott Lobdell's run in Teen Titans (vol. 4) and Superman (vol. 3) #23.3, which featured H'El in the Forever Evil event. (Note: Superman (vol. 3) #23.3 - To He'l and Back, Action Comics Annual #2 Krypton Returns, Part 1, Superboy (vol. 6) #25 - Krypton Returns, Part 2: Beware the Eradicator!, Supergirl (vol. 6) #25 - Krypton Returns, Part 3: Kara's Last Stand Against the Clones!, Superman (vol. 3) #25 - Krypton Returns, Part 4: My Enemy, My Father?)
Justice League: Throne of Atlantis	2012–2013	A vengeful Ocean Master returns and the war for Atlantis triggers a battle between Aquaman and the Justice League.
Batman: Requiem	2013	A series of issues consisting of the Bat-Family reacting to the death of Damian Wayne. (Note: Detective Comics #18; Batman and Robin (vol. 2) #18, Batman (vol. 3) #18; Batgirl (vol. 4) #18; Catwoman (vol. 4) #18; Nightwing (vol. 3) #18; Red Hood and the Outlaws #18; Batman Incorporated #6-9; Teen Titans (vol. 4) #18; Worlds' Finest #10)
Superman: Psi War	2013	Running through some of the Superman books, the Man of Steel must face down a new, and insidious, threat. (Note: Superman (vol. 3) #18-24, Annual #2; Action Comics (vol. 2) #24; Superboy (vol. 6) #22-24)
Batman: Zero Year	2013–2014	Detailing the New 52 origin of the Dark Knight, as well as adventures featuring other characters during that time period (Barbara Gordon, Dick Grayson, Jason Todd, Barry Allen, John Stewart and others)
Justice League: Trinity War	2013	The Justice League, Justice League of America and Justice League Dark will take it to the next level! And so are DC's Trinity; Superman, Batman and Wonder Woman as they fight to find the truth of who could pit them against one another in this lead-up to Forever Evil. DC Comics - The New 52: FCBD Special Edition #1
**Forever Evil**	2013–2014	The outcome of Trinity War. Justice League (vol. 2) #30; Justice League of America (vol. 3) #14; Suicide Squad (vol. 2) #30; Teen Titans (vol. 4) #24-25; Forever Evil Aftermath: Batman vs. Bane #1: Blight: Following the events of Trinity War, John Constantine awakens in the House of Mystery, unsure of how he got there. Trinity of Sin: Pandora #4-5 and Trinity of Sin: Phantom Stranger #12-13
Green Lantern: Lights Out	2013	A crossover that involves the four Green Lantern books, published in October. (Note: Green Lantern (vol. 5) #24; Green Lantern Corps (vol. 3) #24; Green Lantern: New Guardians #24, Red Lanterns #24, Green Lantern (vol. 5) Annual #2)
Supergirl: Red Daughter of Krypton	2013–2014	A crossover involving Supergirl as the newest member of the Red Lantern Corps. Crossovers also with "Atrocities", a Red Lanterns storyline . (Note: Supergirl (vol. 6) #26-29; Green Lantern (vol. 5) #28; Red Lanterns #28-29; Supergirl (vol. 6) #30; Red Lanterns #30; Supergirl (vol. 6) #31; Red Lanterns #31-32; Supergirl (vol. 6) #32-33; Red Lanterns #33; Red Lanterns Annual #1; Red Lanterns #34)
Batman: Gothtopia	2014	An event set in Batman titles. (Note: Batgirl #27 - "A Healing Curse"; Catwoman (vol. 4) #27 - "Happiness is a Cold Gun"; Detective Comics (vol. 2) #27 - "Gothtopia, Part 1 of 3: The Perfect Crime"; Batwing #27 - "Not All That Glitters"; Birds of Prey (vol. 3) #27, Detective Comics (vol. 2) #28 - "Gothtopia, Part 2 of 3: The Maddening Crowd"; Birds of Prey (vol. 3) #28 - "The Wings of Truth!"; Catwoman (vol. 4) #28 - The Way of the Cat"; Batwing #28 - "Master Torres Was Right"; Detective Comics (vol. 2) #29 - "Gothtopia, Part 3 of 3: The Truth and Nothing But")
Worlds' Finest: First Contact	2014	A crossover between Batman/Superman and Worlds' Finest, in which Earth-2's Huntress and Power Girl come face to face with Earth-1's Batman and Superman for the first time. (Note: Worlds' Finest #19-21, Annual #1; Batman/Superman #8-9)
Superman: Doomed	2014	After going all out fighting a brutal battle to stop Doomsday, Superman undergoes a transformation that puts the world and all those he cares about at risk.
Green Lantern: Uprising	2014	Rebellion has spread across the universe as former allies join forces with the Durlans, Khunds, and Outer Clans to overthrow the authority of the Corps. (Note: Green Lantern (vol. 5) #31 - Uprising Part 1: Battle of Wills", Green Lantern Corps (vol. 3) #31 - "Uprising Part 2: Prison Break", Green Lantern (vol. 5) #32 - "Uprising Part 3: Sea Change", Green Lantern Corps (vol. 3) #32 - "Uprising Part 4: Insidious!", Green Lantern (vol. 5) #33 - "Uprising Part 5: Last Stand of the Lanterns", Green Lantern Corps (vol. 3) #33 - "Uprising Part 6: Fatale")
Batman: Endgame	2014–2015	A six-issue comic book story arc, plus four tie-ins featuring Batman. Set after the events of Batman Eternal, the story involves the return from the dead of Batman's arch-enemy, the Joker, following his disappearance in the 2012 story arc Death of the Family. (Note: Batman (vol. 2) #35-40, Annual #3; Detective Comics: Endgame #1; Batgirl: Endgame #1; Arkham Manor: Endgame #1; Gotham Academy: Endgame #1)
Green Lanterns/New Gods: Godhead	2014	In the aftermath of Green Lantern: Lights Out, Highfather, the leader of the New Gods, discovers that the ring-wielders breached the Source Wall and now he is trying to find those secrets for himself by using one ring of every color of the emotional spectrum. What follows threatens to alter the fabric of the universe in Godhead, a month-long crossover event that finds Green Lantern and the New Gods entangled in a struggle for intergalactic survival. (Note: Green Lantern/New Gods: Godhead #1; Green Lantern (vol. 5) #35-37, Annual #3; Green Lantern Corps (vol. 3) #35-37; Green Lantern: New Guardians #35-37; Infinity Man and the Forever People #4-6; Red Lanterns #35-37; Sinestro #6-8)
**The New 52: Futures End**	2014–2015	What would happen to the DC characters five years later?
Earth 2: World's End	2014–2015	Earth 2 of the New 52...a world much like the New 52 Earth, but yet so different. A world that saw its greatest heroes die – and new ones take their places. A world where Superman became its greatest villain, and a man named Zod seeks to save it along with Batman, Green Lantern, the Flash and other heroes. A world they can only save from the forces of Apokolips through great personal sacrifice! Death and destruction will follow each week, and you will never know who will live and who will die!
**Convergence**	2015	Spun out of the final issues of The New 52: Futures End and Earth 2: World's End, leading to the end of the New 52 imprint. The story was told over a nine-week miniseries beginning with a #0 issue, with 40 two-part miniseries, tie-ins from various writers and artists that examine the worlds of the DC Universe over the decades, as well as the heroes and villains contained within. Writer Jeff King handles the scripting and storytelling for the main miniseries, with Scott Lobdell helping with the overall plot. Some of the tie-ins see the brief return of pre-New 52 Universe characters.: **DC YOU** spotlights some of the 24 brand-new and 25 continuing fan favorite series in the DC Comics lineup.; Superman: Lois & Clark (October 2015-May 2016): Following the epic events of Convergence, here are the adventures of the Last Son of Krypton and last daughter of Earth of the Pre-New 52 universe as they try to survive with their newborn son in a world that is not their own. But can they keep this world from suffering the same fate as their own? Can this Superman stop the villains he once fought before they are created on this world? What is Intergang, and why does Lois' discovery of it place everyone she loves in jeopardy? What will happen when their nine-year-old son learns the true identity of his parents? Make way for the original power couple for better or for worse, for richer or for poorer, in sickness and in health, until death do them part!
Truth	2015–2016	The New 52 imprint may be over, but the continuity goes on. Following Convergence, changes to the relationship between Superman and Batman and between Superman and Wonder Woman have taken effect. A new Batman patrols Gotham City in a mechanical suit and Wonder Woman is rocking a new look and an attitude to boot. Things are strained and it is the worst time for secrets to come out. So what happens when the Kryptonian's biggest secret is revealed to the world? (Note: Divergence FCBD Special Edition #1 - "The Rookie; Exposed; Darkseid War, Prologue Two: The Other Amazon", Superman/Wonder Woman #18 - "Dark Truth", Batman/Superman #21 - "Truth Hurts Part One", Superman (vol. 3) #41 - "Before Truth, Part 1", Action Comics (vol. 2) #41 - "Hard Truth Part One", Batman/Superman #22 - "Truth Hurts Part Two", Superman/Wonder Woman #19 - "Dark Truth Part Two", Action Comics (vol. 2) #42 - "Hard Truth Part Two", Superman (vol. 3) #42 - "Before Truth Part 2", Superman/Wonder Woman #20 - "Dark Truth Part Three: A Matter of Trust", Batman/Superman #23 - "Truth Hurts Part Three", Action Comics (vol. 2) #43 - "Hard Truth Part Three", Superman (vol. 3) #43 - "Before Truth Part 3", Superman/Wonder Woman #21 - "Dark Truth Part Four: Truth Hits Everybody", Batman/Superman #24 - "Truth Hurts Part Four", Action Comics (vol. 2) #44 - "Hard Truth Part Four", Superman (vol. 3) #44 - "Before Truth Part 4", Superman/Wonder Woman #22 - "Heart of the Sun", Batman/Superman #25 - "Savage Hunt Part 1", Action Comics (vol. 2) #45 - "Blind Justice Part One", Superman (vol. 3) #45 - "Street Justice", Superman/Wonder Woman #23 - "Ravenous", Batman/Superman #26 - "Teamwork", Superman (vol. 3) #46 - "Knocked Out!", Action Comics (vol. 2) #46 - "Blind Justice Part Two: Into the Shadows", Superman/Wonder Woman #24 - "Power Hungry", Batman/Superman #27 - "Trust", Action Comics (vol. 2) #47 - "Blind Justice Part Three: Consumed", Superman (vol. 3) #47 - "Infiltrated")
Darkseid War	2015–2016	The event runs from Justice League (vol. 2) #40-#50 and also includes five Gods and Monsters one-shots and a Darkseid War Special. (Note: Justice League (vol. 2) #40 - "Darkseid War Prologue", Justice League (vol. 2) #41 - "Darkseid War Chapter One: God vs. Man", Justice League (vol. 2) #42 - "Darkseid War Chapter Two: The New God", Justice League (vol. 2) #43 - "Darkseid War Chapter Three: Taken", Justice League (vol. 2) #44 - "Darkseid War Chapter Four: The Death of Darkseid", Justice League: Darkseid War - Batman #1 - "God Only Knows", Justice League (vol. 2) #45 - "Darkseid War Act Two: After Death Chapter 1", Justice League: Darkseid War -Flash #1, Justice League: Darkseid War - Superman #1 - "God of Steel", Justice League: Darkseid War - Green Lantern #1 - "Will You Be My God?", Justice League: Darkseid War - Shazam #1 - "Mightiest", Justice League: Darkseid War - Lex Luthor #1 - "The Omega Judgment", Justice League (vol. 2) #46 - "Darkseid War Act Two: After Death Chapter 2", Justice League (vol. 2) #47 - "Darkseid War Act Three: Gods of Justice Chapter 1", Justice League #48 - "Darkseid War Act Three: Gods of Justice Chapter 2 - Crime Pays", Justice League: Darkseid War Special #1 - "Darkseid War: The Darkness Within", Justice League (vol. 2) #49 - "Darkseid War Chapter 9: Power Mad", Justice League (vol. 2) #50 - "Darkseid War Conclusion: Death and Rebirth")
Robin War	2015–2016	Tensions between the various Robins erupt into an all-out war. Intended as a six-part event over the course of the month. (Note: Detective Comics (vol. 2) #47; Grayson #15; Robin: Son of Batman #7; We Are Robin #7; Robin War #1-2; Gotham Academy #13; Red Hood/Arsenal #7; Teen Titans (vol. 5) #15)
The Savage Dawn	2016	Following Superman's showdown with Vandal Savage in the 2015 Superman (vol. 3) Annual #3, Kal'El has become desperate to regain his powers. Time is running out and his enemies are determined to destroy him, so Superman must try the unthinkable and expose himself to kryptonite in order to become renewed. (Note: Superman (vol. 3) Annual #3 - "Savage Dawn", Superman/Wonder Woman #25 - "A God Somewhere", Action Comics (vol. 2) #48 - "Savage Dawn: Assault", Superman (vol. 3) #48 - "Treatment", Superman/Wonder Woman #26 - "Skyfall", Action Comics (vol. 2) #49 - "Savage Dawn: Immortal Combat", Superman (vol. 3) #49 - "Sacrifice", Superman/Wonder Woman #27 - "Slam Bang", Action Comics (vol. 2) #50 - "Resurrection", Superman (vol. 3) #50 - "What Could Have Been, What Can Still Be, And What Is")
The Final Days of Superman	2016	His time without powers made Kal-El realize that the world is in need of more protectors...more super-powered beings like himself, especially given that he is now dying. But where will he find such beings? And what about the rumor he has heard of another older Superman married to another Lois Lane? Previously announced as Super League. (Note: Action Comics (vol. 2) #51-52; Superman (vol. 3) #51-52; Superman/Wonder Woman #28-29; Batman/Superman #31-32)
**DC Rebirth**	2016	What happens when the titles of the New 52 reach their 52nd issue? What comes next? DC Rebirth is coming in June 2016. DC Comics' titles return to #1 issues after some have a Rebirth issue and Action Comics and Detective Comics return to their Pre-New 52 renumbering. One character dies, three will return who have been missing and a revelation will make it obvious that the DC Universe has been missing a part of itself.

=== Post-DC Rebirth ===
Event	Date	Developments
Batman: Night of the Monster Men	2016	As a huge storm approaches, Batman, Batwoman and Nightwing try and prepare Gotham City for the worst, but nothing can prepare the heroes for the enormous monsters rampaging through the streets! Batman needs all of his allies to unite in order to stop these mad science monsters from tearing Gotham apart. (Note: Batman (vol. 3) #7-8; Nightwing (vol. 4) #5-6; Detective Comics #941-942)
Justice League vs. Suicide Squad	2016–2017	Batman has begun to question the need for Amanda Waller's Task Force X in a world where the Justice League already exists. Determined, he decides to put a stop to the Suicide Squad, but the Squad will not go gentle into that good night that easily. A six-part miniseries starting with two issues in December before becoming weekly in January 2017. The event is a prelude to the relaunch of Justice League of America in February 2017. (Note: Justice League vs. Suicide Squad #1-6; Justice League (vol. 3) #12-13; Suicide Squad (vol. 5) #8-10)
Superman Reborn	2017	In DC Universe Rebirth #1, the enigmatic Mr. Oz told this Superman, "You and your family are not what you believe you are. And neither was the fallen Superman." Now, in the first DC Rebirth crossover between Superman and Action Comics, the shocking truth behind Oz's words is revealed. It begins with one of Oz's prisoners escaping and ends in a tragic moment for Lois and Superman. Fallout across the entire Superman line in April. (Note: Superman (vol. 4) #18-19; Action Comics #975-978; Supergirl (vol. 7) #8; Superwoman #8-9; Trinity (vol. 2) #9)
Batman/The Flash: The Button	2017	The cataclysmic events of DC Universe Rebirth #1 continue here! The Dark Knight and the Fastest Man Alive, the two greatest detectives on any world, unite to explore the mystery behind a certain blood-stained smiley face button embedded in the Batcave wall. What starts as a simple investigation turns deadly when the secrets of the button prove irresistible to an unwelcome third party—and it is not who anyone suspects! It is a mystery woven through time and the ticking clock starts here! (Note: Batman (vol. 3) #21-22 and The Flash (vol. 5) #21-22)
The Lazarus Contract	2017	The Titans and the Teen Titans must team up if they hope to survive their greatest enemy—Deathstroke the Terminator! (Note: Titans (vol. 3) #11; Teen Titans (vol. 6) #8; Deathstroke (vol. 4) #19-20; Teen Titans: The Lazarus Contract Special #1)
**Dark Nights: Metal**	2017–2018	First come the Dark Days, which give way to the Dark Nights, which give birth to the Dark Matter. Welcome to the New Age of DC Heroes. A six-part miniseries that has been years in the making from the mind of Scott Snyder, who laid Easter eggs for the event as far back as the New 52. Batman is investigating the Nth metal and what it means for the DC Universe, but the heroes need to stop him. Waiting in the wings is an ancient but familiar evil who, if released, will bring the twisted Batmen of the Dark Multiverse with him. The event introduces new DC Universe titles under The New Age of DC Heroes banner, beginning in December 2017. (Note: Dark Days: The Forge #1; Dark Days: The Casting #1; Dark Nights: Metal #1-6; Batman: The Red Death #1; Batman: The Murder Machine #1; Batman: The Dawnbreaker #1; Batman: The Drowned #1; Batman: The Merciless #1; Batman: The Devastator #1; The Batman Who Laughs #1; Batman: Lost #1; Hawkman: Found #1; Dark Knights Rising: The Wild Hunt #1; Gotham Resistance; Bats Out of Hell): Gotham Resistance: The shocking events of Dark Nights: Metal have transformed Gotham City into a mosaic of fantastical realms full of monsters, magic and DOOM! An S.O.S. from Dick Grayson sends Robin back to Gotham to find a number of hometown heroes (and anti-heroes) including Batgirl, Harley Quinn, Killer Croc, the Black Canary and a certain Emerald Archer all trapped in a Riddler-esque labyrinth of madness and death! (Note: Teen Titans (vol. 6) #12; Nightwing (vol. 4) #29; Suicide Squad (vol. 5) #26; Green Arrow (vol. 6) #32); Bats Out Of Hell: After the harrowing events of Dark Nights: Metal #3, the Justice League has scattered around the world to find the only artifacts that can fight back against the invasion of the Dark Multiverse. The League thinks they know how to take back their world, but they are not prepared for who is standing in their way: the Seven Dark Knights of the Dark Multiverse! (Note: The Flash (vol. 5) #33; Hal Jordan and the Green Lanterns #32; Justice League (vol. 3) #32-33); **The New Age of DC Heroes** (beginning December 2017): As the events of Dark Nights: Metal unfold, new heroes step forward to save the DC Universe. These heroes are part of DC's new heroes initiative and their stories build the future. Seven new titles introduce teams such as the New Challengers and a Fantastic Four-like team called the Terrifics. (Note: Curse of Brimstone #1-; Damage (vol. 2) #1-; Immortal Men #1-6; New Challengers #1-6; Sideways #1-; Silencer #1-; The Terrifics #1-; Unexpected #1-); **Justice League: No Justice** (May 2018): Dark Nights: Metal left the DC Universe transformed in ways both terrifying and wondrous—and only the Justice League is strong enough to face the threats to come...or are they? (Note: DC Nation #0; Green Arrow (vol. 6) Annual #2; Justice League: No Justice #1-4)
**Doomsday Clock**	2017–2019	This miniseries resolves the mystery established in DC Universe: Rebirth #1: why Doctor Manhattan (from the Watchmen universe) invaded the DC Universe by modifying its last 10 years of history. Only Superman is close to knowing the answer. (Note: Doomsday Clock #1-12)
Super Sons of Tomorrow	2017–2018	The Batman of Tomorrow travels to the present to prevent a cataclysmic disaster before it happens, revealing that Superboy will soon be responsible for the death of millions. But Superman will do anything to protect his son...and the Batman of Tomorrow is unwavering in his resolve to take down the Boy of Steel. (Note: Superman (vol. 4) #37-38; Super Sons #11-12; Teen Titans (vol. 6) #15)
Milk Wars	2018	What happens when the Doom Patrol meets the Justice League of America? Working together, can they destroy the evil, interdimensional corporation called RetConn? To kick off its plan to use the radioactive milk of psychic cows to take the edge off the World's Greatest Heroes, RetConn has gone all the way to the top. Meet Milkman Man, previously unknown son of Krypton, who was sent to our planet only to be adopted by an evil dairy farmer and raised to love all things dairy! (Note: JLA/Doom Patrol Special #1; Mother Panic/Batman Special #1; Shade, the Changing Girl/Wonder Woman Special #1; Cave Carson Has A Cybernetic Eye/Swamp Thing Special #1; Doom Patrol/JLA Special #1)

=== Post-Dark Nights: Metal ===
Event	Date	Developments
Sink Atlantis	2018	
**Heroes in Crisis**	2018–2019	* **Harley Quinn and Poison Ivy**: Harley and Ivy are on the run while attempting to come to terms with each other.: **Flash Forward**: Wally West attempts to solve the truth about the murders in the Sanctuary, if he has a chance to find redemption for himself.
The Witching Hour	2018	An ancient force of dark magic, the witch-goddess Hecate, stirs trouble. Crossover between Justice League Dark and Wonder Woman. (Note: Wonder Woman and Justice League Dark: The Witching Hour #1; Wonder Woman #56-57; Justice League Dark (vol. 2) #4; Justice League Dark and Wonder Woman: The Witching Hour #1)
Drowned Earth	2018	The invading force is led by the Ocean Lords, a race of powerful alien beings who hold an ancient grudge against both Aquaman and Wonder Woman. Their motivations stem from past conflicts, setting the stage for a clash of epic proportions. Crossover between Justice League and Aquaman. (Note: Justice League (vol. 3) #10-12; Aquaman (vol. 8) #41-42; Titans (vol. 3) #28; Justice League/Aquaman: Drowned Earth #1; Aquaman/Justice League: Drowned Earth #1)
Leviathan Rising	2019	The new leader of Leviathan is destroying all secret organizations to archive his own vision of a "New World Order". (Note: Action Comics #1007-1011; Superman: Leviathan Rising Special #1; Year of the Villain Special #1): **Lois Lane**; **Superman's Pal Jimmy Olsen**
The Terminus Agenda	2019	Robin plans to kill Deathstroke the Terminator for good, but the consequences will be high. (Note: Deathstroke (vol. 4) #41-43; Teen Titans (vol. 6) #28-30)
**Year of the Villain**	2019–2020	The repercussions of Dark Nights: Metal continue to aggravate, as Lex Luthor makes a devil's bargain that will change everything in the Multiverse. (Note: Year of the Villain Special #1): **The Infected**: The Batman Who Laughs uses his dark energy to poison several heroes and recruit them for his new cause.; **Year of the Villain: Hell Arisen**: It is the Apex Lex Luthor vs. the Batman Who Laughs. Whoever wins will push the Multiverse into destruction.
**Event Leviathan**	2019	The new Leviathan is recruiting several heroes for his cause. (Note: Event Leviathan #1-6; Action Comics #1012-1014; Supergirl (vol. 7) #34-35; Wonder Woman Annual 2019): Checkmate: A new team of Checkmate is formed, including the DC Universes best detectives, with their mission being to take down Leviathan
City of Bane	2019	Batman confronts Bane, and even his own alternate-timeline father, the Flashpoint Batman! (Note: Batman (vol. 3) #69-85; Batman: Secret Files and Origins #2)
**Dark Nights: Death Metal**	2020–2021	A wild ride with the Justice League facing off against the evil Batman Who Laughs and his army of Dark Knights from the nightmarish Dark Multiverse.
The Joker War	2020	The final battle between Batman and the Joker will be all-out war across Gotham City.
Endless Winter	2020	The Justice League facing off against a powerful and ancient villain, the Frost King, who is determined to plunge the world into an eternal winter. The heroes must race against time to stop the Frost King's relentless blizzard and uncover the secrets of his motivation.

=== Post-Dark Nights: Death Metal ===
Event	Date	Developments
Generations	2020-2021	A threat of cosmic proportion to DC's newest (and oldest) universe compels one of the most unusual groups of heroes ever assembled to take on the most mysterious foe they have ever encountered. What started in Detective Comics #1027 explodes out of Dark Nights: Death Metal to tell the story of the generations-spanning history of the DC Universe! Join the original Batman, Kamandi, Starfire, Booster Gold, Dr. Light, Steel, and Sinestro in their quest to save the universe before time runs out...
**Future State**	2021	A two-month event that examines the possible future of the DC Universe, involving both classic and new characters. New versions of Superman, Batman, Wonder Woman, Green Lantern, The Flash and Aquaman are introduced.
**Infinite Frontier**	2021	A **relaunch initiative** for the entire DC superhero comic book line. It marked a new era following the universe-altering events of "Dark Nights: Death Metal."
Fear State	2021	Involving - Batman (vol. 3) #112-117, Batman: Fear State Alpha #1, Catwoman (vol. 5) #34, Harley Quinn (vol. 3) #6 and I Am Batman #0
War for Earth-3	2022	Amanda Waller hatches an audacious plan to conquer Earth-3, a parallel world where the Justice League's counterparts exist as villainous versions of themselves. This Earth-3 is home to the Crime Syndicate, a team of evil superpowered beings who rule with an iron fist. Superman is here twisted into the tyrannical Ultraman, Wonder Woman becomes the sadistic Superwoman, and other heroes are similarly warped into villainous reflections of their heroic counterparts.
Trial of the Amazons	2022	The Amazons of Themyscira, led by Hippolyta, believe they should focus on isolating themselves to preserve their utopian society. The Bana-Mighdall, fierce warriors led by Artemis, argue that the Amazons must be proactive in protecting the world from threats. Meanwhile, the Esquecida, a hidden tribe led by Antiope, seek Nubia's help to combat a mysterious evil unleashed from Doom's Doorway.
Shadow War	2022	The worlds of Batman, Robin (Damian Wayne) and Deathstroke collide.
Justice League vs. Legion of Super-Heroes	2022	The Justice League have a conflict with the Legion of Super-Heroes, wrapping both storylines started by Brian Micheal Bendis
**Dark Crisis on Infinite Earths**	2022	Superman, Batman, Wonder Woman, and the rest of the Justice League are seemingly killed in battle with Pariah. The remaining heroes are left to protect the world from supervillains and battle the Great Darkness, a cosmic entity and the embodiment of darkness.

=== Post-Dark Crisis on Infinite Earths ===
Event	Date	Developments
Flashpoint Beyond	2022	Batman (Thomas Wayne) returns to his home universe, which he believed to be destroyed.
The New Golden Age	2022	The event aims to reintroduce readers to the classic JSA characters and explore their legacy alongside the DC multiverse's past, present, and future.
Lazarus Planet	2023	Lazarus Resin storms spread worldwide, causing humans to develop superpowers and altering the powers of those who already have them.
The Flash: One-Minute War	2023	What happens when an entire armada of conquering speedster aliens shows up on Earth's doorstep? The most intense battle the Earth has ever waged in the span of 60 seconds!
**Knight Terrors**	2023	Insomnia traps various heroes in nightmares, and Deadman is among the only ones who can stop him.
Gotham War	2023	Catwoman coordinates efforts to lower crime in Gotham.
**Titans: Beast World**	2023-2024	Beast Boy transforms people worldwide into animal hybrids after Doctor Hate traps him in a mindless, Starro-like form.
House of Brainiac	2024	Brainiac returns with a new weapon to destroy Superman and an army of unkillable Czarnians, posing a major threat to the Man of Steel and his allies.
**Absolute Power**	2024	In response to the events of "Beast World", Amanda Waller and the Suicide Squad join forces with Failsafe and the Brainiac Queen, beginning a campaign to remove the powers of metahumans worldwide.
We are Yesterday	2025	The first major crossover of DC All In introduces the Legion of Doom and more in the pages of Batman/Superman: World's Finest, Justice League Unlimited, and the Batman/Superman: World's Finest 2025 Annual.
The Starbreaker Supremacy	2025	The Green Lantern Corps battle Starbreaker, who has allied with Sorrow (Nathan Broome) to destroy the emotional spectrum. During this battle, the Corps rebuild the central batteries of the other Lantern Corps, which were previously destroyed.
**DC K.O.**	2025-2026	Earth's heroes compete in a tournament so that the winner can obtain enough energy to confront Darkseid, who has returned to the main universe after creating and absorbing power from the Absolute Universe.
Reign of the Superboys	2026	Superman goes missing following the events of DC K.O., leading Superboy-Prime to replace him in his absence. Meanwhile, Martian Manhunter, Mary Marvel, and Booster Gold travel through time in an attempt to find Superman.
Kingdom of Zod	2026	
Batman: Bad Seeds	2026	
First Light	2026	

Note: All bolded events are considered "company-wide" or are major events which affect the DC universe.

== Intercompany crossovers ==
Crossover	Timespan	Company	Notes
DC/Marvel	1976–2026	Marvel Comics	DC/Spider-Man (1976–2026); Superman/Spider-Man (1976–2026); Superman vs. The Amazing Spider-Man (1976): Superman and Spider-Man must stop a world domination/destruction plot hatched in tandem by their respective arch-nemeses, Lex Luthor and Doctor Octopus.; Superman and Spider-Man (1981): Superman and Spider-Man battle the Parasite and Doctor Doom, with the Hulk and Wonder Woman guest-starring.; Superman/Spider-Man (2026): A virus infected Brainiac teams with Dr. Octopus to transfer the virus into the minds of humans on Earth. Superman and Spider-Man team up to put a stop to it.; Backup stories: Lois Lane & Mary Jane: While their respective husbands battle a Sentinel, Mary Jane and Lois engage in girl talk. Lois ultimately gives the X-Man Gambit some of her playing cards so Gambit can help Superman and Spider-Man finish off the giant robot.; Superboy-Prime & The Amazing Spider-Man: Set in the 1980s, Superboy finds himself in the Marvel Universe and lures the black costume clad Spider-Man into another dimension so he can hand him over to an alternate version of the High Evolutionary. Ultimately Superboy changes his mind and teams up with Spider-Man.; Superboy & Spider-Man 2099: Spider-Man 2099 heads to 2039 to stop the corporations LexCorp and Alchemax from merging. This merger will have major repercussions in the future. He encounters and then teams up with Superboy (from the 30th century) and Batman Beyond.; Superman's Pal Jimmy Olsen & Carnage: Jimmy gets a job at the Daily Bugle while trying to find Spider-Man to photograph, he encounters and is murdered by Carnage.; Jonathan Kent & Ben Parker: Superman and Spider-Man talk about their respective fathers and how they had a huge impact on their lives. They don't realize that their fathers met years before they were born, teaming up to save some children during a storm.; Daily Planet & Daily Bugle: J. Jonah Jameson has a nationally televised debate with Lois Lane about the merits of opinion in the media.; Power Girl & Punisher: When the Punisher makes his way to an underground club to hunt supervillains, he encounters and teams up with Power Girl, who was there on a blind date. After the bad guys are defeated, the two of them go out together.; Spider-Man/Superman (2026): Spider-Man and Superman team up to battle Lex Luthor and the Green Goblin who send the Venom symbiote to possess Superman. After the heroes win, Clark Kent invites Peter Parker and Aunt May over to have dinner with him and the Kents.; Backup stories: Spider-Man Noir & Superman: In 1938, Spider-Man Noir and the new hero Superman team up to defeat Lex Luthor and clear J Jonah Jameson's name.; Gwen Stacy & Lana Lang: The two college girls meet on campus and talk about the two guys they have crushes on; Peter Parker and Clark Kent.; Mysterio vs. Superman: Mysterio teams with Saturn Queen to channel rage through the Hulk (via a Red Lantern) to cause mass chaos. This causes heroes and villains across America to battle one another. A group of heroes led by Superman and the Thing save the day.; Hobgoblin vs. Steel: The Hobgoblin steals an invention from Steel, only for Steel to team up with Thor to take down the villain.; Ghost-Spider & Supergirl: The two heroines team up to stop Livewire.; Miles Morales: Spider-Man & Superman: The two heroes team up to battle Brainiac and Dormammu.; Symbiotes in Metropolis: The Mighty Thor and Wonder Woman team up to battle symbiote infused Parademons (called Paravenoms) from Apokolips.; Spider-Man & Superman: When Spider-Man remembers the day Gwen Stacy died, Superman comforts him and offers him advice.; Batman/Spider-Man (1995–1997); Spider-Man and Batman: Disordered Minds (1995): The Joker and Carnage meet when behavioral psychiatrist Cassandra Briar attempts to use the two killers as tests for a computer chip that will 'lobotomize' their homicidal instincts.; Batman & Spider-Man: New Age Dawning (1997): Ra's al Ghul manipulates the Kingpin to his side and begins plans for worldwide devastation.; Superboy/Spider-Man (2015); Spider-Verse (2015): The fusion of Superboy and Spider-Man from the Amalgam Universe, Spider-Boy, can be seen in the final panel of "It's the Little Things" from Spider-Verse #2.; DC/Hulk (1981–1999); Batman/Hulk (1981); Batman vs. The Incredible Hulk (1981): Batman and the Hulk battle the Joker and the Shaper of Worlds.; Superman/Hulk (1999); The Incredible Hulk vs. Superman (1999): You did not think their battle in DC vs. Marvel was the last word on the issue, did you? Worlds tremble as the two must fight it out, but is there something more sinister afoot?; Teen Titans/X-Men (1982); The Uncanny X-Men and The New Teen Titans (1982): The two teams must unite to battle Darkseid, Deathstroke, and Dark Phoenix.; Batman/Punisher (1994); Batman/Punisher: Lake of Fire (1994): The Punisher and Batman meet, and things do not go well.; Punisher/Batman: Deadly Knights (1994): Batman meets the Punisher again, and things worsen.; Darkseid/Galactus (1995); Darkseid vs. Galactus: The Hunger (1995): Galactus tries to devour Apokolips.; DC/Silver Surfer (1995–1997); Green Lantern/Silver Surfer (1995); Green Lantern/Silver Surfer: Unholy Alliances (1995): Green Lantern and the Silver Surfer battle Parallax and Thanos.; Superman/Silver Surfer (1997); Silver Surfer/Superman (1997): The Last Son of Krypton meets the Herald of Galactus.; DC/Marvel (1996–1998); DC Versus Marvel (1996): Two brothers who personify the DC and Marvel Universes become aware of the other's existence and challenge each other to a series of duels involving each universe's respective superheroes. The losing universe will cease to exist. The story has an out-of-universe component in that although there are 11 primary battles, the storyline does not show one side as victorious. The "brothers" resolve the situation by temporarily creating a new universe, called the Amalgam Universe, which is occupied by merged versions of many of the heroes. An inter-dimensional character called Access eventually manages to restore the universes to their normal state.; Amalgam Comics (1996–1997): An imprint owned by both DC and Marvel that published one-shots set on a fusion of New Earth and Earth-616 called the Amalgam Universe or Earth-9602.; Amazon (1996): A story following the fusion of Wonder Woman and Storm.; Doctor Strangefate (1996): Two stories following the fusion of Doctor Fate, Doctor Strange, and Professor X.; Assassins (1996): Two stories following the genderswapped fusion of Deathstroke and Daredevil and the fusion of Catwoman and Elektra.; JLX (1996): Two stories following the fusions of the Justice League and the X-Men.; Legends of the Dark Claw (1996): Two stories following the fusion of Batman and Wolverine.; Super-Soldier (1996): Two stories following the fusion of Superman and Captain America.; Bruce Wayne, Agent of S.H.I.E.L.D. (1996): A story following the fusion of Bruce Wayne and Nick Fury.; Bullets and Bracelets (1996): A story following the fusion of Diana Prince and Lynn Michaels as well as the fusion of Steve Trevor and the Punisher.; Magneto and the Magnetic Men (1996): A story following Magneto and the fusions of the Metal Men and the Brotherhood of Mutants.; Speed Demon (1996): A story following the fusion of the Flash and Ghost Rider.; Spider-Boy (1996): A story following the fusion of Superboy and Spider-Man.; X-Patrol (1996): Two stories following the fusions of Doom Patrol and X-Force.; Bat-Thing (1997): Two stories following the fusion of Man-Bat and Man-Thing.; Dark Claw Adventures (1997): A parallel of the Batman: The Animated Series spin-off comic, The Batman Adventures, that supposedly features the animated series version of Dark Claw.; Generation Hex (1997): Two stories set in an alternate version of the Amalgam Universe's Wild West that feature the fusions of Generation X and DC's various Wild West characters. The team name is an amalgamation of Generation X and Jonah Hex's names.; JLX Unleashed (1997): The JLX must team up with the Judgement League Avengers (a fusion of the Justice League and the Avengers) to defeat Fin Fang Flame (a fusion of Brimstone and Fin Fang Foom).; Lobo the Duck (1997): Two stories set in an alternate Amalgam Universe where various heroes have been murdered and it's up to the fusion of Lobo and Howard the Duck to find the murderer.; Super-Soldier: Man of War (1997): Two stories featuring Super-Soldier set during World War II in the style of Golden Age comics.; Challengers of the Fantastic (1997): Two stories following the fusions of the Challengers of the Unknown and the Fantastic Four.; The Exciting X-Patrol (1997): X-Patrol must defeat Brother Brood, the fusion of Brother Blood and Brood.; Iron Lantern (1997): Two stories featuring the fusion of Green Lantern and Iron Man.; The Magnetic Men featuring Magneto (1997): Two stories featuring Magneto and the Magnetic Men facing off against the Sinister Society, a fusion of the Secret Society of Super-Villains and the Sinister Six.; Spider-Boy Team-Up (1997): Spider-Boy teams up with the Legion of Galactic Guardians 2099, the fusions of the Legion of Super-Heroes, and the Guardians of the Galaxy.; Thorion of the New Asgods (1997): Two stories following the fusion of Orion and Thor.; DC/Marvel: All Access (1996–1997): Various aspects of each company's main universe start transporting from one another and it's up to Access to prevent them from merging again.; Unlimited Access (1997–1998): Access' powers start acting up and send him and others across time and space.; Batman/Captain America (1997); Batman/Captain America (1997): The two heroes, mortals fighting alongside the mightiest of beings, must fight a threat to both worlds.; Batman/Daredevil (1997–2000); Daredevil/Batman: Eye for an Eye (1997): Batman and Daredevil must work together to defeat Two-Face and Mr. Hyde.; Batman/Daredevil: King of New York (2000): Batman and Daredevil must work together again to defeat Ra's al Ghul and the Kingpin.; DC/Fantastic Four (1999–2025); Superman/Fantastic Four (1999); Superman/Fantastic Four: The Infinite Destruction (1999): Superman and the Fantastic Four must unite to stop the Cyborg Superman and Galactus.; The Flash/Fantastic Four (2025); The Flash/Fantastic Four (2025): The Flash and the Fantastic Four team up to battle Gorilla Grodd across time.; Justice League/Avengers (2003); JLA/Avengers (2003): Krona, an exiled Oan, travels across the Multiverse and destroys universes, seeking the truth of creation. When he arrives in the Marvel Universe, the Grandmaster, wanting to save his universe, proposes that they play a game.; Batman/Deadpool (2025): Deadpool/Batman (2025): The Joker hires Deadpool to capture Batman. The heroes then work together to stop the villain.; Backup stories: Captain America & Wonder Woman: In a shared universe, the two heroes have been battling villains from World War 2 to the future.; Jeff! & Krypto: The two super pets play long distance volleyball.; Daredevil & Green Arrow : The heroes battle The League of Shadows and Count Vertigo in Hell's Kitchen New York.; Rocket Raccoon & Green Lantern: The Guardians of the Galaxy and the Guardians of the Universe swap heroes. This allows Rocket to wear a Green Lantern ring.; Old Man Logan & Batman: The Dark Knight: The aged heroes get into a fight to the finish.; Logo: An Amalgam Comics story where Logo (Wolverine/Lobo) bursts on the scene.; Batman/Deadpool (2025): When a romantic fling between Eternity and Kismet causes reality to be distorted, Batman and Deadpool team with Grant Morrison to stop Cassandra Nova. Story features the return of the Amalgam Comics character Dark Claw, and the two heroes merging briefly into Dead Bat.; Backup stories: John Constantine: Hellblazer & Doctor Strange: When a disruption in magic causes beings from the two universes to battle one another (Mephisto vs Neron and Ghost Rider vs Swamp Thing), John Constantine seeks out Doctor Strange to put things right.; Nightwing & Laura Kinney: Wolverine: Dick and Laura team up to rescue Laura's sister Gabby from Killer Croc.; Harley Quinn & The Incredible Hulk: The Hulk and Harley battle a robot biker mouse and toxic waste mutated killer hot dogs at an amusement park.; Static & Ms. Marvel: The two heroes team up to battle a Kaiju.; Shazam/Thor (2025); Thor/Shazam! (2025): Thor and Captain Marvel team up to battle Mister Mind, who has stolen the powers of ten beings across both universes.; Supergirl/Blade (2026); Supergirl/Blade (2026); Aquaman/Jeff the Land Shark (2026); It's Jeff!/Aquaman (2026)
Superman/Quik	1987	Nestlé	Superman Meets the Quik Bunny (1987): Superman and Quicky team up to take on the Weather Wizard.
The Shadow/Doc Savage	1990	Condé Nast	The Shadow Strikes!: Twin Trails (1990): When a scientist is kidnapped she enlists the help of Doc Savage but unknown to them The Shadow is already on the case.; Doc Savage: Uneasy Allies (1990): After Doc Savage captures a disguised Shadow the heroes realize they're working on the same case and team up.; The Shadow Strikes!: The Big Boom (1990): The heroes come to the conclusion that a munitions maker named Compton Moore was behind the kidnapping and go on the hunt.; Doc Savage: Triple Cross (1990): The Shadow and Doc Savage must work together to stop The Conflagration Man before he can bring the United States into war.
DC/Judge Dredd	1991–1998	Fleetway Publications	Batman/Judge Dredd (1991–1998); Batman/Judge Dredd: Judgement on Gotham (1991): Batman and Judge Dredd must unite to fight Judge Death.; Batman/Judge Dredd: Vendetta in Gotham (1993): Batman once again meets Judge Dredd from Mega-City 01.; Batman/Judge Dredd: The Ultimate Riddle (1995): Batman and Judge Dredd continue their adventures.; Batman/Judge Dredd: Die Laughing (1998): The dimensional walls weaken as the two men team up once again to stop a familiar threat.; Lobo/Judge Dredd (1995); Lobo/Judge Dredd: Psycho-Bikers vs. the Mutants From Hell! (1995): The greatest judge in Mega-City 01 must join forces with the biggest badass of the stars (according to himself, that is).
DC/Predator	1991–2001	Dark Horse Comics	Batman/Predator (1991–1997); Batman Versus Predator (1991–1992): Batman must face off against the Predator, an alien bounty hunter.; Batman Versus Predator II: Bloodmatch (1994): The alien bounty hunter returns to Gotham.; Batman Versus Predator III: Blood Ties (1997): Batman encounters the alien bounty hunters once again.; Superman/Predator (2001); Superman vs. Predator (2001): A S.T.A.R. Labs expedition uncovers an ancient derelict spacecraft in the jungles of Central America. Superman goes to investigate.; Justice League/Predator (2001); JLA vs. Predator (2001): The entire Justice League is needed to battle a threat from the stars.
Batman/Grendel	1993	Dark Horse Comics	Batman/Grendel: Devil's Riddle & Grendel/Batman: Devil's Masque (1993): Batman meets the famous Dark Horse Comics assassin.; Batman/Grendel: Devil's Bones & Grendel/Batman: Devil's Dance (1996): Grendel-Prime travels to present-day Gotham City, drawn by the skull of Hunter Rose.
Batman/Spawn	1994-2022	Image Comics	Batman/Spawn: War Devil (1994): The Dark Knight meets with Hell's former champion.; Spawn/Batman (1994): Batman must team up with Spawn to stop a mutual threat. This has no relation to the previous crossover.; Batman/Spawn (2022): Two dark heroes, cursed by tragedy, find their paths again crossing...but not by choice!
DC/Milestone	1994	Milestone Comics	Worlds Collide (1994): The DC superheroes meet their Milestone Comics counterparts.
DC/Alien	1995–2000	Dark Horse Comics	Superman/Alien (1995–2002); Superman/Aliens (1995): Superman does battle with the Xenomorphs.; Superman/Aliens 2: God War (2002): Darkseid acquires several Xenomorph eggs and begins wreaking havoc.; Batman/Alien (1997–2001); Batman/Aliens (1997): Batman parachutes into the jungle near the Guatemala-Mexico border while investigating the disappearance of a Wayne Enterprises geologist. What he finds tests the very limits of his ability.; Batman/Aliens II (2001): In 1927, an explorer discovered something frozen in the Alaska ice and brings it home with him to Gotham City.; Green Lantern Corps/Alien (2000); Green Lantern Versus Aliens (2000): Several Green Lanterns, primarily Kyle Rayner, must face off against the titular Xenomorphs.
Catwoman/Vampirella	1997	Harris Publications	Catwoman/Vampirella: The Furies (1997): Catwoman and Vampirella join forces against a common threat.
DC/The Mask	1997–2000	Dark Horse Comics	Lobo/The Mask (1997); Lobo/Mask (1997): Lobo is contracted to take out The Mask.; The Joker/The Mask (2000); Joker/Mask (2000): The Man Who Laughs meets The Mask, and the world is a more terrifying place for it.
Azrael/Ash	1997	Event Comics	Azrael/Ash (1997): The vigilante must help someone new to town, a dimension-hopping hero just trying to get back home to his dead-end retail job.
Superman/Madman	1997	Dark Horse Comics	The Superman/Madman Hullabaloo! (1997): The Man of Steel meets the Man of Madness, and chaos ensues.
DC/Hellboy	1998	Dark Horse Comics	Batman/Hellboy/Starman (1998): The Golden Age Starman, Ted Knight, is kidnapped, and Batman and Hellboy team-up to rescue him.
DC/The Darkness	1999–2005	Image Comics	The Darkness/Batman (1999); The Darkness/Batman (1999): The Dark Knight and Jackie Estacado cross paths. At first antagonistic, they must put aside their differences when a greater threat emerges.; The Darkness/Superman (2005); The Darkness/Superman (2005): Superman and Jackie Estacado team up to thwart a force that threatens both their worlds.
DC/Tarzan	1999–2002	Dark Horse Comics	Batman/Tarzan (1999); Batman/Tarzan: Claws of the Cat-Woman(1999): A 1930s Batman teams up with Lord Greystoke/Tarzan to help the priestess of an African cat cult protect her people.; Superman/Tarzan (2001–2002); Superman/Tarzan: Sons of the Jungle (2001–2002): Lord Greystoke grows up in England, while Kal-El is raised by the apes.
Superman/Terminator	1999	Dark Horse Comics	Superman vs. The Terminator: Death to the Future (1999): Superman must aide Sarah and John Conner in their battle against Skynet.
Batgirl/Ghost	2000	Dark Horse Comics	Ghost/Batgirl: The Resurrection Machine (2000): Under the tutelage of the Oracle, Batgirl investigates the bombing of the International Diamond Exchange which has resulted in severe casualties. This leads her to the city of Arcadia, where Ghost is doing an investigation of her own.
Justice League/Witchblade	2000	Image Comics	JLA/Witchblade (2000): The Justice League gets help from a certain NYPD homicide detective with a supernatural surprise.
Young Justice/SpyBoy	2002	Dark Horse Comics	SpyBoy/Young Justice (2002): The team gets some help from an unexpected ally working for a secret organization.
Superman/Savage Dragon	2002	Image Comics	Superman & Savage Dragon: Metropolis (1999): Superman meets the Dragon in Metropolis, but there's not much time for small talk when a group of young, super-powered rapscallions from Apokolips show up.; Superman & Savage Dragon: Chicago (2002): A heaping helping of Metropolis heavies have hightailed it to the Windy City to join forces with the Vicious Circle. Superman must form an uneasy alliance with the Savage Dragon to rid two cities of two sets of super- villains.
DC/Planetary	2002–2003	WildStorm Productions	Justice League/Planetary (2002); Planetary/JLA: Terra Occulta (2002): Batman recruits Superman and Wonder Woman to help him uncover the secrets of the Planetary organization.; Batman/Planetary (2003); Planetary/Batman: Night on Earth (2003): In their efforts to find a man known as John Black the Planetary team end up coming into conflict with Batmen from across the Multiverse.
Batman/Danger Girl	2004	IDW Publishing	Batman/Danger Girl (2004): The all-female espionage network teams up with the Bat from Gotham to thwart an international criminal conspiracy.
Justice League/Cyber Force	2005	Top Cow Productions	JLA/Cyberforce (2005): The Cyberforce is fighting a hoard of cyber-zombies that have invaded Budapest. The zombies' invasion soon prompts the Justice League to intervene.
Batman/The Spirit	2006	Will Eisner estate	Batman/The Spirit (2006): As the police forces of their home cities gather for the Policemen's Benevolent Association's Annual Law Enforcement Convention in Hawaii, Batman and The Spirit must team up to crash the Criminal Convention happening alongside it.
DC/Alien/Predator	2007	Dark Horse Comics	Superman and Batman Versus Aliens and Predator (2007): Superman and Batman must team up to fight Xenomorphs in the Andes Mountains.
DC/Tangent	2008–2009	Tangent Comics	Tangent: Superman's Reign (2008–2009): DC and Tangent heroes to defeat the Tangent version of Superman.
DC/WildStorm	2008	WildStorm Productions	DC/Wildstorm: Dreamwar (2008): The DC and WildStorm universes start merging into each other and an all out war ensues.
DC/The Spirit/Doc Savage/The Avenger	2010–2011	Will Eisner estate/Condé Nast	First Wave (2010–2012): A line of comics created by DC that featured various pulp and DC characters in a shared universe.; Batman/Doc Savage Special (2010): After hearing about The Bat Man's connection to a grizzly murder Doc Savage seeks to take down this gun-totting Golden Age version of the Caped Crusader.; First Wave: Book One (2010): Doc Savage and The Spirit separately try and take down the Golden Tree cabal.; First Wave: Book Two (2010): Doc Savage is in pursuit of the Blackhawks while they pursue The Spirit.; First Wave: Book Three (2010): Doc Savage and The Spirit finally team up and they're determined to figure out who killed Doc's father although The Batman might be two steps ahead of them.; First Wave: Book Four (2010): Doc Savage and The Spirit are able to track the Blackhawks to Hidalgo where they must form an uneasy alliance with The Avenger.; First Wave: Book Five (2011): The Bat Man, Doc Savage, and The Spirit all team up to face off against Anton Colossi.; First Wave: Book Six (2011): The Bat Man, Doc Savage, and The Spirit must all pull together or the world may be doomed.; First Wave Special (2011): The Bat Man and Doc Savage team up to stop The Avenger from murdering mob boss Shonder Zeev.
Justice League/The 99	2010	Teshkeel Comics	JLA/The 99 (2010): A worldwide threat forces the members of the 99 and the Justice League to work together in order to save the planet.
DC/Archie	2010–2019	Archie Comics	Tiny Titans/Little Archie (2010–2011); Tiny Titans/Little Archie and his Pals (2010–2011): A crossover featuring child-aged versions of DC's heroes and Archie and friends.; Harley Quinn/Poison Ivy/Archie (2017–2018); Harley & Ivy Meet Betty & Veronica (2017–2018): After accidentally swapping bodies with Betty and Veronica, Harley and Ivy must stop the destruction of a swamp in Riverdale while Betty and Veronica evade Gotham authorities.; Batman '66/Archie (2018–2019); Archie Meets Batman '66 (2018–2019): Some of the Dynamic Duo's most formidable enemies have taken the fight to Riverdale and up to them in addition to Archie and company to put an end to their nefarious plot.
DC/Star Trek	2011–2017	IDW Publishing	Legion of Super-Heroes/Star Trek: The Original Series (2011–2012); Star Trek/Legion of Super-Heroes (2011–2012): The Legion of Super-Heroes must aid the Federation against an emerging threat.; Green Lantern Corps/Star Trek; Star Trek/Green Lantern: The Spectrum War (2015): The Federation arrives in the DC Universe to repay a favor and help the Green Lantern Corps face down a new threat.; Star Trek/Green Lantern: Stranger Worlds (2016-2017)
The Spirit/The Rocketeer	2013	IDW Publishing	The Rocketeer/The Spirit: Pulp Friction (2013): The hero of the '50s must aid the champion of the pulps when their city is threatened by new arrivals.
Batman '66/The Green Hornet	2013	Dynamite Entertainment	Batman '66 Meets the Green Hornet (2013): The Green Hornet and Kato team up with the Caped Crusaders from the 1966 TV show.
DC/Teenage Mutant Ninja Turtles	2015–2019	IDW Publishing	Batman/Teenage Mutant Ninja Turtles; Batman/Teenage Mutant Ninja Turtles (2015–2016): After being transported to an alternate universe by Krang, the Turtles and the Shredder must team up with Batman and to fight off his rouges gallery and find their way home.; Batman/Teenage Mutant Ninja Turtles II (2017): Batman and the Turtles team up to take on Bane.; Batman/Teenage Mutant Ninja Turtles III (2019): Batman and the Turtles team up to take on Krang.; The Batman Adventures/Teenage Mutant Ninja Turtles; Batman/Teenage Mutant Ninja Turtles Adventures (2016–2017): A crossover between the DC Animated Universe version of Batman and the TMNT from the 2012 TV series.
Batman '66/The Man from U.N.C.L.E.	2016	Turner Entertainment Co.	Batman '66 Meets the Man from U.N.C.L.E. (2016): U.N.C.L.E. agents Napoleon Solo and Illya Kuryakin team up with the Caped Crusaders from the 1966 TV show.
DC/Wizarding World	2016	Scholastic Press	Constantine: Lost Guard of Azkaban (2016): A Comic-Con 2016 DC panel VIP exclusive short comic illustrated to market the release of the film Fantastic Beasts and Where to Find Them, along with the Justice League Dark animated film's trailer. Constantine is sought out by Batman, as a mysterious caped entity is leaving the citizens of Gotham City in a vegetative state, with Batman describing the victims as "having lost their soul". The caped figure is later identified to be a rogue Dementor that had been wandering the American continent since the late 1920s. Batman and Constantine are unable to combat the Dementor until an unnamed wizard comes to their aid with a Patronus Charm. The wizard is revealed to be an Auror, working for the Ministry of Magic, tasked with capturing rogue Dementors in the muggle world. This comic was never published for sale due to licensing rights limitations held by Warner Bros. Pictures and Scholastic Press.
Batman '66/The Avengers	2016–2017	Boom! Studios	Batman '66 Meets Steed and Mrs. Peel (2016): John Steed and Emma Peel team up with the Caped Crusaders from the 1966 TV show.
Gotham Academy/Lumberjanes	2016	Boom! Studios	Lumberjanes/Gotham Academy (2016): The cast of Lumberjanes and Gotham Academy must team up to find a missing teacher and camp director.
Masters of the Universe/ThunderCats	2016–2017	Mattel/Warner Bros. Entertainment	He-Man/ThunderCats (2016–2017): Seeking to destroy the ThunderCats once and for all Mumm-Ra seeks out He-Man's Sword of Power.
Justice League/Mighty Morphin Power Rangers	2017	Boom! Studios	Justice League/Mighty Morphin Power Rangers (2017): After a teleporter malfunctions the Power Rangers and their enemies become trapped in the DC Universe so they must team up with the Justice League to defeat their foes and find a way home.
Wonder Woman '77/The Bionic Woman	2017	Dynamite Entertainment	Wonder Woman '77 Meets The Bionic Woman (2017): Wonder Woman and The Bionic Woman are called upon by the U.S. government to help against a new threat.
Booster Gold/The Flintstones	2017	Hanna-Barbera Cartoons	Booster Gold/The Flintstones Special (2017): Booster Gold travels back to prehistoric times to try and find a way to stop alien invaders in the far future and meet Fred Flintstone and Barney Rubble along the way.
Suicide Squad/The Banana Splits	2017	Hanna-Barbera Cartoons	Suicide Squad/Banana Splits Special (2017): After being mistaken for metahumans and thrown in prison, The Banana Splits are recruited into the Suicide Squad.
Adam Strange/Johnny Quest	2017	Hanna-Barbera Cartoons	Adam Strange/Future Quest Special (2017): After being blasted through the multiverse, Adam Strange finds himself in Johnny Quest's universe and it's up to Johnny and his father to send Adam home.
Green Lantern/Space Ghost	2017	Hanna-Barbera Cartoons	Green Lantern/Space Ghost Special (2017): After being trapped in a strange rift in time our two heroes must fight, not only an array of villains, but themselves.
Green Lantern Corps/Planet of the Apes	2017	Boom! Studios	Planet of the Apes/Green Lantern (2017): While searching for Taylor, Cornelius finds a power ring while the Green Lantern Corps must pursue Sinestro to the Planet of the Apes.
Batman/The Shadow	2017–2018	Dynamite Entertainment	Batman/The Shadow: The Murder Geniuses (2017): Batman and The Shadow must put aside their differences to defeat a terrifying new foe known as the Stag.; The Shadow/Batman (2017-2018): Batman and The Shadow must keep their strained relationship together as they try and save the world.
DC/Looney Tunes	2017	Warner Bros. Entertainment	Legion of Super-Heroes/Looney Tunes (2017); Legion of Super-Heroes/Bugs Bunny Special (2017): The Legion of Super-Heroes tries to bring Superboy to the future but is instead met by Bugs Bunny.; Martian Manhunter/Looney Tunes (2017); Martian Manhunter/Marvin the Martian Special (2017): Two Martians clash when Manhunter has to stop Marvin from destroying the Earth.; Lobo/Looney Tunes (2017); Lobo/Road Runner Special (2017): Wile E. Coyote hires Lobo to take out the Road Runner once and for all.; Wonder Woman/Looney Tunes (2017); Wonder Woman/Tasmanian Devil (2017): Wonder Woman must save the world from the terrors of the Tasmanian Devil.; Batman/Looney Tunes (2017); Batman/Elmer Fudd Special (2017): After a chance encounter with Bruce Wayne, Elmer Fudd becomes obsessed with hunting down Batman.; Jonah Hex/Looney Tunes (2017); Jonah Hex/Yosemite Sam Special (2017): After striking it rich, Yosemite Sam hires bounty hunter Jonah Hex to protect him and his fortune.
Wonder Woman/Conan the Barbarian	2017	Dark Horse Comics	Wonder Woman/Conan (2017): When these legendary heroes' fate collides will it leave them victorious or with the Gods cut their lives short?
DC/Young Animal	2018	Young Animal	Justice League/Doom Patrol (2018); JLA/Doom Patrol Special (2018): The interdimensional corporation known as RetCo has taken over the DC Universe with the radioactive milk of psychic cows and it's up to the Doom Patrol to go up against their greatest threat yet, Milkman Man.; Doom Patrol/JLA Special (2018): As RetCo collapses both DC and Young Animal heroes must team up to finish what they started.; Batman/Mother Panic (2018); Mother Panic/Batman Special (2018): Mother Panic discovers a transformed Gotham City where Father Bruce builds up an army of Robins.; Wonder Woman/Shade, the Changing Girl (2018); Shade, the Changing Girl/Wonder Woman Special (2018): Shade has been split into multiple parts, each based on a different mood to serve the fantastic Wonder Wife. Everything seems perfect but then Happy Shade seems to think something is amiss in Wonderland.; Swamp Thing/Cave Carson (2018); Cave Carson Has a Cybernetic Eye/Swamp Thing Special (2018): After sensing a disturbance in the green, Swamp Thing heads to RetCo headquarters where he finds Cave Carson and his crew trying to resist assimilation into the corporation.
The Flash/Speed Buggy	2018	Hanna-Barbera Cartoons	The Flash/Speed Buggy Special (2018): After a race that leaves them stuck in a post-apocalyptic future, it's up to The Flash and Speed Buggy to find their way home while battling the triple threat of Savitar, Speed Demon Buggy, and Reverse Speed Buggy.
Super Sons/Dynomutt, Dog Wonder	2018	Hanna-Barbera Cartoons	Super Sons/Dynomutt Special (2018): The son's of the world's finest, Jon Kent and Damian Wayne, find Damian's friend Dynomutt injured with his superhero owner, The Blue Falcon, seemingly turning to villainy and it's up to the Super Sons to find out why.
Aquaman/Jabberjaw	2018	Hanna-Barbera Cartoons	Aquaman/Jabberjaw Special (2018): Aquaman and Jabberjaw team up to save Aqualand from the threat of Aquaman's estranged brother Ocean Master.
Deathstroke/Yogi Bear	2018	Hanna-Barbera Cartoons	Deathstroke/Yogi Bear Special (2018): It seems Yogi Bear has gone from kidnapping picnic baskets to kidnapping campers so Ranger Smith brings in Deathstroke to finally put a stop to Yogi's tired charade.
Green Lantern/Huckleberry Hound	2018	Hanna-Barbera Cartoons	Green Lantern/Huckleberry Hound Special (2018): Set during the early 1970s, newly minted Green Lantern, John Stewart, teams up with celebrity dog, Huckleberry Hound, to take a stand on the pressing issues of the time.
Nightwing/The Magilla Gorilla Show	2018	Hanna-Barbera Cartoons	Nightwing/Magilla Gorilla Special (2018): After the murder of a famous Hollywood agent Magilla Gorilla is suspect number one and it's up to him and Nightwing to prove his innocence.
Superman/Top Cat	2018	Hanna-Barbera Cartoons	Superman/Top Cat Special (2018): While searching for his missing friend, Bernie, Top Cat gets stuck in the middle of a fight between Superman and some super powered food.
Black Lightning/Hong Kong Phooey	2018	Hanna-Barbera Cartoons	Black Lightning/Hong Kong Phooey Special (2018): Black Lighting and Hong Kong Phooey team up to stop three assassins from completing a text that reveals the darkest martial arts secrets.
DC/Monica and Friends	2018–2020	Estúdios Mauricio de Sousa	Green Lantern/Monica and Friends; Green Lantern/Monica (2018); Batman/Monica and Friends; Batman/Jimmy Five (2018); Aquaman/Monica and Friends; Aquaman/Smudge (2018); Superman/Wonder Woman/Monica and Friends; Superman and Wonder Woman/Chuck Billy (2018); The Flash/Monica and Friends; Maggy/The Flash (2018); Justice League/Monica and Friends; Justice League/Monica and Friends (2018); Justice League/Monica Adventures (2018-2019); Teen Titans Go!/Monica and Friends; Teen Titans Go! Meets Monica and Friends (2020)
Injustice/Masters of the Universe	2018–2019	Mattel	Injustice vs. Masters of the Universe (2018–2019): Set after the alternate ending of Injustice 2, Batman recruits He-Man and the Masters of the Universe to take down Superman's regime once again.
Justice League/Black Hammer	2019	Dark Horse Comics	Black Hammer/Justice League: Hammer of Justice! (2019): The Justice League and Black Hammer gang must team up to stop Starro's attack on both of their worlds.
Batman/Dylan Dog	2019	Sergio Bonelli Editore	Dylan Dog/Batman: Relazioni Pericolose (2019): Batman and Dylan Dog face off against their arch-nemeses. This comic was first published in Italian, and later in English by DC Comics March 12, 2024.
The Flash/Zagor	2022	Sergio Bonelli Editore	Flash/Zagor – La scure e il fulmine (2022) was first published in Italian on March 10, 2022.
Nathan Never/Justice League	2022	Sergio Bonelli Editore	Nathan Never/Justice League – Doppio Universo (2022; lit. "Double Universe") was first published in Italian on November 9, 2022.
The Sandman/Locke & Key	2021	IDW Publishing	Locke & Key/Sandman: Hell & Gone (2021): In order to save her brother's soul from eternal damnation, Mary Locke searches for help in a disintegrating Kingdom of Dreams.
Justice League/RWBY	2021	Rooster Teeth Productions	RWBY/Justice League (2021): Batman, Superman, and Wonder Woman find themselves in RWBY's universe and team with Team RWBY to take down various threats.
Batman/Fortnite Battle Royale	2021	Epic Games	Batman/Fortnite: Zero Point (2021): After a mysterious portal opens in the skies of Gotham City, Batman and Catwoman find themselves on a mysterious with no memory of who they are. Now stuck in an endless loop of gunfights they must team up with a ragtag group from across the omniverse and find their freedom again.
Batman/Fables	2021–2022	Vertigo Comics	Batman vs. Bigby! A Wolf in Gotham (2021–2022): A book from Fabletown finds itself in Gotham City and it's up to Bigby track it down.
Justice League/Monsterverse	2023–2025	Warner Bros. Entertainment; Legendary Pictures; Toho	Justice League/Godzilla vs Kong (2023–2025): Justice League vs Godzilla vs Kong (2023): When the barrier between worlds is breached during a confrontation between the Justice League and the Legion of Doom, Godzilla and Kong emerge on an Earth of the DC Universe.; Justice League vs Godzilla vs Kong 2 (2025); Justice League vs Godzilla vs Kong 3 (2027)
DC/Looney Tunes/Steven Universe/Adventure Time/Scooby-Doo/Tom and Jerry/The Wizard of Oz/Rick and Morty/MultiVersus	2024	Warner Bros. Entertainment; Cartoon Network; Adult Swim; Turner Entertainment Co. Hanna-Barbera Cartoons; Warner Bros. Games	MultiVersus: Collision Detected (2024): A series of strange dreams lead Batman, Superman, and Wonder Woman face to face with a number of individuals from other universes in this prelude to the video game MultiVersus.
DC/Sonic the Hedgehog	2025-2026	Sega	DC x Sonic the Hedgehog (2025-2026); DC x Sonic the Hedgehog (2025): The Justice League (the Flash, Superman, Batman, Wonder Woman, Cyborg, and Green Lantern) teams up with Sonic the Hedgehog and his friends (Miles "Tails" Prower, Knuckles the Echidna, Amy Rose, Shadow the Hedgehog, and Silver the Hedgehog) to stop Darkseid and his army from invading Sonic's world.; DC x Sonic the Hedgehog: Metal Legion (2026)
DC/AEW	2026	AEW	DC X AEW (2026): The Justice League teams up with AEW's roster to recover the shards of the Intergalactic Title Belt.

== See also ==
- Publication history of Marvel Comics crossover events
