= JLApe: Gorilla Warfare! =

1999 DC Comics crossover event

- Cover to JLA Annual #3, art by Art Adams.
- Publisher: DC Comics
- Publication date: 1999
- Genre: Superhero; Crossover
Title(s)
Legends of the DC Universe #19
JLA Annual #3
Batman Annual #23
Aquaman Annual #5
Wonder Woman Annual #8
Flash Annual #12
Superman Annual #11
Green Lantern Annual #8
Martian Manhunter Annual #2
- Main character(s): Justice League; Gorilla Grodd

"JLApe: Gorilla Warfare!" is a DC Comics crossover event published in the various DC annuals in 1999, one of many DC crossover stories.

== Synopsis ==
The apes of Gorilla City have declared open hostility on the rest of the world, using technology that can turn humanoids into apes. The Justice League of America (JLA), save for Batman, are transformed and must deal with both this and the resulting crises. For example, when the people of Atlantis are hit, various powers try the ape-like role of gaining domination by defeating the current alpha male, namely Aquaman.

== Titles ==
- Legends of the DC Universe #19 (Primate Prelude)
- JLA Annual #3
- Batman Annual #23
- Aquaman Annual #5
- Wonder Woman Annual #8
- Flash Annual #12
- Superman Annual #11
- Green Lantern Annual #8
- Martian Manhunter Annual #2

== In other media ==
An adaptation of "JLApe: Gorilla Warfare!" is featured in the Justice League Unlimited episode "Dead Reckoning".

== See also ==
- Marvel Apes
- Gorillas in comics
