= Last Laugh (comics) =

Comics storyline

"Joker: Last Laugh"
- Publisher: DC Comics
- Main character: Joker

Creative team
- Writer(s): Chuck Dixon; Scott Beatty

Joker: Last Laugh is a crossover storyline published by DC Comics in 2001.

== Plot ==
While imprisoned in the Slab penitentiary, the Joker discovers that he has a terminal brain tumor. Determined to go out with a bang, he causes a riot in the Slab and infects the prison's inmates with Joker venom, giving them a Joker-like appearance and behavior. Black Canary, Nightwing, and Batman move in to put down the riot, but the Joker prompts Black Mass to suck the prison into a black hole while he and the other villains escape.

Joker grows disgruntled at the lack of creativity behind his minions' havoc, realizing that "every other crisis" involves red skies and crazy weather. With the assistance of Stormfront and Mister 104, the Joker poisons the atmosphere, spreading Joker toxin across the world. His next plan is the assassination of Lex Luthor.

While the "Jokerized" villains are being captured, Kirk Langstrom works to produce an antidote for the Joker venom with help from Harley Quinn. Black Canary also discovers that the Joker's CAT scans were modified and that the doctors lied to him about his impending death in the hope that it would cause him to lead a more sane life.

Huntress is sent to Arkham Asylum to find Robin, who disappeared into the building and stopped sending out reports. After encountering Killer Croc, she finds what appears to be Robin's shredded outfit. Nightwing, enraged over Robin's death, goes to face the Joker. Nightwing beats him to death until the Batman family, Robin included, arrives on the scene, much to Nightwing's surprise. The Joker is resuscitated and returned to prison.

== Issues ==
=== Core storyline ===
- Joker: Last Laugh Secret Files and Origins #1
- Joker: Last Laugh #1 - #6

=== Tie-in issues ===
- Action Comics #784
- Adventures of Superman #597
- Azrael: Agent of the Bat #83
- Batgirl (vol. 2) #21
- Batman #596
- Batman: Gotham Knights #22
- Birds of Prey #36
- Detective Comics #763
- Flash (vol. 2) #179
- Green Lantern (vol. 3) #143
- Harley Quinn #13
- Impulse #79
- JLA #59
- JSA #29
- Nightwing (vol. 2) #62
- Orion #19
- Robin (vol. 4) #95
- Spectre (vol. 4) #10
- Superboy (vol. 4) #93
- Supergirl (vol. 4) #63
- Superman (vol. 2) #175
- Superman: The Man of Steel #119
- Titans #34
- Wonder Woman (vol. 2) #175
- Young Justice #38

== See also ==
- List of Batman comics
- Publication history of DC Comics crossover events
