= Marvel Apes =

Comic book limited series

- The cover to Marvel Apes #1 (September 2025), art by John Watson

Publication information
- Publisher: Marvel Comics
- Schedule: Bi-weekly
- Format: Limited series
- Genre: Superhero
- Publication date: November — December 2008; February 2009 ("0" issue)
- No. of issues: 5 (four-issue limited series followed three months later by a "0" issue)
- Main character(s): Gibbon; Fiona Fitzhugh; Ape-Vengers; Invaders

Creative team
- Written by: Karl Kesel; Tom Peyer
- Artist(s): Ramon Bachs; Barry Kitson (issue #1); Karl Kesel (issues #2 and #4); Mike McKone (issue #3)
- Letterer: Jared K. Fletcher
- Colorist: Javier Mena Guerrero
- Editor(s): Thomas Brennan; Joe Quesada; Stephen Wacker

Marvel Apes is an American comic book series published by Marvel Comics. The four-issue limited series–written by Karl Kesel, Tom Peyer, and illustrated by Ramon Bachs, Barry Kitson, Kesel, and Mike McKone–was published from September to October 2008. The Marvel Apes reality is designated as Earth-8101.

== Premise ==
Marvel Apes was first suggested as a successor to Marvel Zombies by artist and fan Mark Walsh during a convention Q&A session with Joe Quesada. As with Marvel Zombies before it, Marvel Apes takes place in an alternate universe, in this case a simian-dominated counterpart to Earth-616 that hosts anthropoid versions of popular Marvel superheroes and villains.

As with the introduction of Marvel Zombies in Ultimate Fantastic Four, the Marvel Apes universe is visited by an existing Marvel character; in this case, Gibbon. He is accompanied by a female scientist named Fiona Fitzhugh in what has been described by Kesel as a "The Lord of the Rings-style sprawling epic".

== Plot ==
Martin Blank, the Gibbon, having been restored to his simian appearance, is left with his personal life in shambles. His attempts to side with the heroes are frustrated by his ineptitude and even Princess Python, previously a caring and deeply devoted wife, is now fed up with the meek loser that Gibbon has become. Out of boredom and depression, he replies to an ad posted in the Daily Bugle by Fiona Fitzhugh, a spunky and cheery young scientist hoping to study the nature of super-powered individuals.

Upon hearing that Gibbon had his powers since birth (as opposed to the majority of mutants who gain their mutation during puberty), Fiona analyzes his aura and hypothesizes that Gibbon may come from another reality in the multiverse. While attempting to contact such a reality, Fiona and the Gibbon are sucked into a portal that takes them to a world populated by intelligent simians. Gibbon manages to help Spider-Monkey and the Ape-Vengers, simian versions of the Avengers, subdue Doctor Ooktavius, and he is inducted into the Ape-Vengers. Fiona is sent to ask for Reed Richards' help in returning to Earth-616; she discovers that in the ape reality, the cosmic storm that gave the Fantastic Four their powers also gave a human appearance to Sue Storm.

Gibbon is at first excited to become a member of the Ape-Vengers, but after witnessing the brutal lynching of Doctor Ooktapus, he questions the Ape-Vengers methods. Meanwhile, Fiona and the ape Richards are able to recreate a gateway back to Earth-616. Captain America then reveals that he is actually the simian counterpart of the vampire Baron Blood; in this reality, Baron Blood was able to take over Captain America's appearance and powers by sampling the superhero's blood in the 1940s. The super-soldier serum also removed Baron Blood's vulnerability to sunlight. After turning the Invaders into vampires as well, Blood became the leader of the Ape-Vengers and uses their bloody lynching of supervillains as a way to feed.

Gibbon, with the help of a cadre of dissident heroes, finds the real Captain America, still frozen in ice, and thaws him to lead the last free heroes against their vampiric foe. Baron Blood and the vampiric Invaders are killed, but the portal is destroyed after Gibbon, Fiona, and the ape version of Speedball are sent through. Recovering from the battle, they prepare for the possibility of residents of the ape universe finding another way into their reality.

== Publication history ==
Marvel Apes began publication on September 3, 2008, and ended on October 29 of the same year.

=== Issues ===
Issue	Title	Publication date	Ref.
#1	"Apes of Wrath!"	September 3, 2008	
#2	"See No Evil!"	September 17, 2008	
#3	"Gorilla Warfare!"	October 1, 2008	
#4	"100 Monkeys!"	October 29, 2008	

== Legacy ==
=== Spin-offs ===
Following the conclusion of Marvel Apes, several spin-offs were published by Marvel Comics in 2009: a one-shot comic book, Marvel Apes: Speedball Special, on March 11; a second one-shot, Marvel Apes: Amazing Spider-Monkey Special, on April 8; a third one-shot, Marvel Apes: Grunt Line Special, on May 28; a three-issue digital comic, Marvel Apes: Prime Eight, from August 26 to September 9; and a fourth one-shot that also serves as a crossover with Marvel Zombies, subtitled Evil Evolution, on November 4.

=== Other comics ===
Spider-Monkey appeared in the 2014–2015 comic event "Spider-Verse". The Marvel Apes version of Captain Britain, known as Captain Baboon, made a cameo appearance as a member of the Captain Britain Corps in Excalibur vol. 4 #15 (November 2020).

== Collected editions ==
Title	Material collected	Publication date	ISBN	Ref.
Marvel Apes	Marvel Apes #1–4, Amazing Spider-Man vol. 1 #110–111, and The Amazing Spider-Man Family #1	December 10, 2008	978-0785139140	
Marvel Apes: The Evolution Starts Here	Marvel Apes: Amazing Spider-Monkey, Marvel Apes: Grunt Line, Marvel Apes: Prime Eight, and Marvel Apes: Speedball	September 23, 2009	978-0785139911	

== In other media ==
Spider-Monkey made a non-speaking appearance as a member of Miguel O'Hara's Spider-Society in the Sony Pictures Animation film Spider-Man: Across the Spider-Verse (2023).

== See also ==
- Gorillas in comics
- JLApe: Gorilla Warfare!, a concept by DC Comics similar to Marvel Apes.
- Larval Universe, another alternate Marvel earth home to animal versions of superheroes.
