= The Trial of Superman =

American comic book

"The Trial of Superman!"
- Cover of Superman: The Man of Steel #50 (November 1995), art by Jon Bogdanove.
- Publisher: DC Comics
- Publication date: November 1995 – January 1996
- Genre: Superhero; Crossover
Title(s)
Action Comics #715–717
Steel (vol. 2) #22
Superman (vol. 2) #106–108
Superman: The Man of Steel #50–52
Superman: The Man of Tomorrow #2–3
The Adventures of Superman #528–531
- Main character(s): Superman; Tribunal Prime; Cyborg Superman

"The Trial of Superman!" is a multi-title American comic book crossover story arc released by DC Comics in the various Superman titles from between November 1995 and January 1996.

== Plot ==
Superman is arrested by a group of intergalactic law enforcement officers under the command of the Tribunal, an intergalactic court dedicated to justice. Taken to another galaxy, Superman briefly escapes, but is recaptured and has his superpowers negated. He is then put on trial by the Tribunal, which is made up of the aliens Tribunal Prime, Pollux, and Ternion. Having already discovered that one of his relatives contributed to the destruction of the planet Krypton and the annihilation of the Kryptonian race, Superman is found guilty of the crime by reason of ancestry and sentenced to death.

With his superpowers suppressed, Superman finds himself incarcerated with criminals from all over the universe. He allies with a few of them to escape, including Mope-Stattor Neer, a frail humanoid alien with the ability to inflate his muscles. Superman is hunted across the galaxy while Superboy, Supergirl, Steel, the Eradicator, and Alpha Centurion search for him. They are captured by Tribunal Prime after discovering that Cyborg Superman is working for him.

After encountering and fighting Cyborg Superman, Superman is recaptured and brought to Tribunal Prime, who intends to execute him by strapping him to a rocket and firing him into the kryptonite cloud located where Krypton used to be. Cyborg Superman, however, has plans of his own. During Superman's sentencing, Cyborg Superman assimilates the technology of Tribunal Prime's planet in an attempt to create a new Warworld. Superman's friends attempt to stop Cyborg Superman, but are distractions at best and ineffective at worst; Superman frees himself from the rocket and defeats Cyborg Superman by disconnecting his body from the planet.

Despite Superman saving his home planet from Cyborg Superman, Tribunal Prime still stands by Superman's execution order. Superman refutes them in a speech that shakes Pollux and Ternion's resolve. Superman plans to depart, but returns to rescue Mope. He is confronted by Cyborg Superman, now possessed by Tribunal Prime. Superman is defeated and strapped to a backup rocket for his execution. However, Mope sacrifices himself to save Superman by taking his place on the rocket.

Believing Superman to be dead, Tribunal Prime turns to Cyborg Superman, whom they are interrogating and torturing to make him admit his guilt for the destruction of Coast City. Tribunal Prime orders that he be tortured even more upon hearing this confession; Pollux is struck by Tribunal Prime when he disagrees with him. Right after this, Superman confronts Tribunal Prime, after which Pollux and Ternion declare him to be guilty of multiple crimes, including corruption. After a brief scuffle with Superman, Tribunal Prime tries to leave the planet, but Pollux and Ternion order him to be killed.

Pollux and Ternion still consider Superman guilty, but now free of Tribunal Prime's bias, they revoke Superman's death sentence; instead, they sentence him to a life of atonement for his "crime". Since he has engaged himself in a never-ending battle for truth and justice, they order him to continue that battle, which he gladly agrees to do, understanding the spirit of the sentence. Superman returns home as Pollux and Ternion send Cyborg Superman into a black hole. (Note: Cyborg Superman later escapes from the black hole and, along with Parallax (Hal Jordan), Thanos, and Terrax, battles Green Lantern (Kyle Rayner) and the Silver Surfer in the crossover issue Green Lantern/Silver Silver: Unholy Alliances (February 1996).)

== List of "The Trial of Superman!" issues in chronological order ==
=== Prologue ===
- The Adventures of Superman #528 (October 1995): "Deadly Silence" (1995/40) (Note: Although not identified as tie-in issues on the covers, this issue - and the two following it - contain events that lead into the story arc.) (Note: The years and numbers in the list are on the front covers of all but one of the tie-in issues. Steel (vol. 2) #22 is the only tie-in issue listed that does not have this feature because it is a Superman spin-off title and not a Superman title.)
- Superman: The Man of Tomorrow #2 (fall 1995): "Pawns" (1995/41)
- Action Comics #715 (November 1995): "Doc Parasite!" (1995/42)

=== Main story ===
- Superman: The Man of Steel #50 (November 1995): "Split Personality" (1995/43)
- Superman (vol. 2) #106 (November 1995) (no title) (1995/44)
- The Adventures of Superman #529 (November 1995): "Jail Break!" (1995/45)
- Action Comics #716 (December 1995): "Fugitive Justice!" (1995/46)
- Superman: The Man of Steel #51 (December 1995): "Wanted" (1995/47)
- Superman (vol. 2) #107 (December 1995): "Bottled Up!" (1995/48)*
- Steel (vol. 2) #22 (December 1995): "Deliverance!" (Note: Although not exactly identified as a tie-in issue on the cover, several characters from the story arc appear in this issue and it ultimately leads into the next part of it.)
- The Adventures of Superman #530 (December 1995): "Different Demons" (1995/49)*
- Superman: The Man of Tomorrow #3 (winter 1995): "Fighting Back" (1995/50)*
- Action Comics #717 (January 1996): "H'Tros City!" (1996/1)
- Superman: The Man of Steel #52 (January 1996): "Crime and Punishment" (1996/2)
- Superman (vol. 2) #108 (January 1996): "No Escape!" (1996/3)
- The Adventures of Superman #531 (January 1996): "Justice!" (1996/4)

* also a tie-in issue of Underworld Unleashed

== Collected editions ==
"The Trial of Superman" was collected as Superman: The Trial of Superman trade paperback (DC Comics, November 1997, 257 pages, ISBN 978-1563893315).
