= Wrath of the First Lantern =

Green Lantern comic book

- Publisher: DC Comics
- Publication date: February – June 2013
- Genre: Superhero
Title(s)
Green Lantern (vol. 5) #17-20
Green Lantern Corps (vol. 3) #17-20
Green Lantern: New Guardians #17-20
Red Lanterns #17-20
- Main character(s): Hal Jordan; Guy Gardner; John Stewart; Kyle Rayner; Kilowog; Ganthet; Krona; Volthoom

Creative team
- Writer(s): Geoff Johns; Tony Bedard; Peter Tomasi
- Artist(s): Doug Mahnke; Tyler Kirkham; Fernando Pasarin
- Green Lantern: Wrath of the First Lantern: ISBN 1401246931

Wrath of the First Lantern is a 2013 Green Lantern comic book crossover event as part of The New 52. The crossover follows directly after the events of “Rise of the Third Army”, where the First Lantern, Volthoom, was inadvertently released by the now-rogue Guardians of the Universe and now seeks to remake the universe in his image. It serves as the final storyline of Geoff Johns’ 9-year run on Green Lantern.

== Synopsis ==
=== Prologue ===
Volthoom was born one million years in the future, where he and his mother discovered the energy electromagnetic spectrum and created a Travel Lantern which allowed them to travel through time and space. However, alien invaders arrived on his planet and Volthoom used the Travel Lantern to escape, but in the process, his mother was killed. While traveling, Volthoom created the power rings. One of his creation was the Ring of Volthoom and another power ring that would be used by the Crime Syndicate of America on Earth 3. He arrived on Earth in the year 10,000,000,000 BC where he was greeted by aliens (the ancestors of the Guardians of the Universe) from the planet Maltus. Volthoom participated in a ritual where he created the first power ring and became the first Lantern. He became insane and the aliens defeated him, took his power ring away and imprisoned him in a chamber.

In 21th century, the Guardians used Volthoom's DNA to create a horde of infectious warriors. This horde, called the Third Army, almost assimilated all intelligent life in the galaxy, but was stopped by rogue members of the Green Lantern Corps. During a fierce battle on Oa, the Guardians drained more power from Volthoom, but this proved to be their undoing when they inadvertently freed the First Lantern. Volthoom vengefully captured the Guardians and then began siphoning energy from multiple bearers of power rings, in the hopes of gaining enough energy to rewrite the entire universe. Black Hand is in possession of a Black Lantern ring and encounters Hal Jordan and Sinestro (who is a Green Lantern). During the confrontation, Hal Jordan and Sinestro are knocked out and they are trapped in the prison Volthoom was in.

Simon Baz becomes a Green Lantern when Sinestro and Hal Jordan send their Lantern rings on Earth to ask for anyone to help free them from the evil First Lantern, Volthoom. He then helps the Green Lantern Corps deal with the Third Army.

=== Main story ===
Ganthet remembers when he saw a Green Lantern ring on the Creator of the Universe's finger when there was a huge explosion and Volthoom appears 15 million years ago. Simon Baz wakes up and sees Black Hand about to kill him and fights Black Hand off while asking where is Hal Jordan. Volthoom captures the Guardians and looks into Ganthet's memory, being interested when he sees Sinestro becoming a Green Lantern and wonders how much power he could take from his life. Simon Baz defeats Black Hand and frees the trapped Guardians, but Black Hand uses his ring to send him to the prison where Hal Jordan and Sinestro are. On Maltus, Volthoom realizes that his imprisonment has caused his power to decrease: he is unable to truly alter reality. However, Volthoom has gained knowledge of Hal Jordan, his friends (Kyle Rayner, Carol Ferris, Guy Gardner, John Stewart, Saint Walker) and his enemies (Atrocitus). Volthoom plans to use their life forces to regain his power and remake the universe as he sees fit.

Simon remembers his encounter with Black Hand, and Sinestro says that if Simon is in the Dead Zone, then Black Hand must have killed him. Hal believes Simon is still alive, given that his ring is still shining. Sinestro tries to get the ring and nearly kills Simon, but Simon pulls out his gun and shoots him. Sinestro is unaffected by the shot, as Tomar-Re (a prisoner) says that anyone with a sufficiently strong will to live. Even so, Sinestro still wants to obtain the ring and fight the Guardians. He then tells the story of Volthoom to the prisoners while also explaining that the Guardians created the Manhunters.

Back outside B'dg and the Guardians fight Black Hand in order to try to get Simon back into the realm of the living. While the Guardians restrain Black Hand, B'dg uses a beam to manipulate the black ring. The Guardians start to bring back Simon, but Simon does not want to leave Hal Jordan alone, which causes his power ring to create another duplicate. Sinestro and Hal fight once more over who gets to go outside, but when Sinestro manages to conjure an image of Carol Ferris, Hal Jordan is distracted and Sinestro returns, with Simon back on Earth to ask where is Volthoom. Tomar-Re tells Hal Jordan that the only way to escape this prison is to become a Black Lantern, and Hal Jordan realizes he cannot wield the Black Lantern ring properly because he is technically alive and wonders if he could escape by "dying".

Sinestro escapes and goes to his home planet of Korugar, where he meets his wife Arsona and tells her to get ready for war, despite her resentment towards Sinestro. Hal still remains trapped in the Dead Zone and is contemplating jumping off a cliff so that he can obtain the black ring and fight the First Lantern. Tomar-Re attempts to dissuade him, saying that the dead have no saying in any matters of life. Suddenly Volthoom appears and notices that Sinestro has emotional turmoil. Enraged, Sinestro and Volthoom engage in battle with Sinestro wounding Volthoom. Volthoom explains he did not come for Sinestro but came for his planet since Sinestro fills his people with different kinds of emotions. Volthoom destroys the planet and Sinestro hovers among the ruins of Korugar, grief-stricken because of Volthoom's actions. He decides to fight Volthoom once last time and regains his Yellow Battery. In the Dead Zone, Hal and Tomar-Re witness the arrival of the Korugarians and become aware of Korugar's fate, but Sinestro is not among them. Knowing that they are out of chance, Hal finally jumps off the cliff.

Hal Jordan becomes a Black Lantern and Volthoom arrives at the center of the universe, where the Guardians are waiting. Volthoom plans to use the Green Lanterns' Central Battery to become even stronger, but just then the Green Lantern Corps (John Stewart, Kilowog, Guy Gardner, Carol Ferris) arrive and attack. In the Dead Zone, Hal has acquired the black ring and Black Hand's body disintegrates. Tomar-Re asks Hal how will he escape from the afterlife and Hal replies he will ask for help from some friends. At Nok, homeworld of the Indigo Tribe, Indigo-1 begins to channel the light of the Black Lantern. Atrocitus and the Red Lantern Corps arrive to get revenge on Volthoom, but Volthoom blasts the Red Lanterns away.

Kyle Rayner (who is a White Lantern) also brings the Blue Lanterns, Indigo Tribe, and Star Sapphires as additional reinforcements. The combined Lantern forces unite their powers, allowing Mogo to fire a powerful combined energy blast at Volthoom. Volthoom is not affected, but at that moment, Sinestro smashes him with the Yellow Central Battery. Enraged, Sinestro attacks Volthoom with everything he has got. The Indigo Lanterns free Hal Jordan's prison and Hal arrives on the battlefield with a dead army. Despite this, Volthoom easily rips through the dead army and attacks Hal, trying to seek the one point in his life where he was fully consumed by despair. Hal initially believes it was Parallax, but Volthoom finds Hal's true weakness: the death of his father.

Young Hal sees Volthoom, who says that he is an angel who can bring his father back; he only has to wish for it. Tearful, the boy accepts and Volthoom uses his despair to regain his full power. Sinestro returns to the Yellow Central Battery and summons Parallax, becoming his latest host. Sinestro completely controls Parallax, becoming even more powerful, but Volthoom reminds Sinestro that he is the First Lantern as well as a God and defeats him. Hal returns to the Dead Zone. There, he meets his father, who says that he and his mother are very proud of him. Hal Jordan goes to the tomb of Nekron (an entity of the Black Lantern Corps) and frees him.

Hal Jordan extracts the emotional spectrum from Volthoom, while warning Sinestro about killing Volthoom, and Nekron kills him with his scythe. As he embraces his younger self and reclaims his title as a green lantern, Hal moves on from his parents' death when the Sinestro Corps were Sinestro to attack the Green Lanterns. Hal and Sinestro engage in a climactic battle, but Sinestro reveals that he had killed all of the Guardians of the Universe, except Ganthet, for them being indirectly responsible for his planet's destruction and betrayal to the corps, but left one for Atrocitus. Sinestro prepares to leave Oa, leaving the Corps in the hands of Hal and the Templar Guardians. Before they leave, Hal asks Sinestro the question he was about to make while they were on Ysmault: "Were we ever truly friends"? Sinestro and his Corps depart from Oa, but not before Sinestro answers Hal's question: "That's the tragedy of all of this, Jordan. Hal. We'll always be friends".

Meanwhile, in the far future, Toris, the Bookkeeper of Oa, narrates the entire story to Snow, the newly trained Green Lantern corp, about the entire event from the Book of Oa. With Snow questioning the bookkeeper about their future, Toris reviewed their fate by observing their future within the Book such as Guy Gardner becoming a veteran telling his lifetime of his younger self, John Stewart being elected as the state senator in the US, Hal Jordan marrying Carol Ferris while starting a family, and Kyle Rayner becoming a healer for the entire galaxy. As for other lantern corps, Larfleeze and Atrocitus are remained irredeemable because of their obsession with vengeance and greed they latched onto, which their fate was uncertain; Iroque chooses to discard her Indigo ring honoring Abin Sur's compassion while Saint Walker supports his family along with his fellow Blue Lantern Corps providing hope. As for Sinestro, he sends Ganthet to reunite with Sayd having shown sympathy for their departure, and persuades Larfleeze to keep it secret from anyone leaving his fate unimportant, according to Toris. As he concluded the story, Toris confirmed Snow that Hal Jordan is the main inspiration to the entire galaxy as the "greatest Green Lantern of all" and " the spark....that started the everlasting fire."

=== Tie-ins ===
==== Green Lantern Corps ====
Guy Gardner is attacked by Volthoom where he sees Guy Gardner's past and torments Guy Gardner based on his actions of killing innocent people. Volthoom does the same thing to John Stewart, Kilowog, Fatality, and other Green Lanterns when Mogo distracts Volthoom which allows the Green Lanterns to get away. Mogo creates an illusion where Volthoom attacks them in order to make the Green Lanterns ready for the final battle. After the main story, everyone celebrates their victory but Guy Gardner finds out an alien name Xar is attacking his family and kills Xar and spends time with his family.

==== Green Lantern: New Guardians ====
Volthoom encounter Kyle Rayner and tries to put him in an illusion where he sees his dead girlfriend Alex but Kyle breaks free of his illusion. Volthoom feeds on Kyle's misery gaining more power before he disappears. Volthoom tries absorbing Carol Ferris, Larfleeze, and Saint Walker's emotions but Carol breaks free and escapes, while Larfleeze and Saint Walker both overcame their visions. Carol Ferris finds Kyle Rayner and Kyle Rayner tries to contact Arkillo, Atrocitus, Larfleeze, Saint Walker and Indigo-1 but they do not respond. Kyle Rayner and Carol Ferris hear that Sinestro was located but arrive at the destroyed Korugar. Sinestro arrives and attacks Carol and Kyle, thinking that they have allied with Volthoom but Simon Baz and B'dg restrain Sinestro. Kyle Rayner agrees to revive Korugar but the strain is too much and he gives up. Sinestro breaks free and gets the White Lantern ring but is deemed unsuitable, and leaves with the Yellow Power battery. Simon Baz is also deemed unsuitable, while trying to resurrect Korugar with the White Lantern Ring. After the end of the crossover, Kyle Rayner and Saint Walker go around Earth healing the planet and it is revealed that Ganthet is secretly alive, along with Sayd.

==== Red Lanterns ====
Atrocitus goes to Maltus (the abandoned home of the Guardians) where he meets the spirit of Krona and goes to the Great heart. Volthoom appears and destroys Krona's spirit and encounters Atrocitus who escaped from the Manhunters. Volthoom grabs Atrocitus and sees his entire life. Meanwhile, Rankorr saves a woman named Kim from being mugged and goes on a date with her but is suddenly attacked by Bleez. Atrocitus breaks free of Volthoom's grip but Volthoom escapes after gaining more power. Atrocitus calls all Red Lantern to kill himself. Rankorr tells Kim that Bleez is his evil stepmother, and Atrocitus reveals he wants to die after Volthoom's torture. Rankorr makes up with Bleez, and they witness Atrocitus attacking the Red Lanterns and gaining more power. Atrocitus announces to the Red Lanterns that they will all go to Oa to bathe in the blood of the Guardians. After the battle against Volthoom, the Red Lanterns leave Oa and go to Ysmault to fight off an alien named Immortals while Atrocitus kills a Guardian, and Kim breaks up with Rankorr after Rankorr hunts down and kills her abuser.

== Titles involved ==
=== Main titles ===
- Green Lantern (vol. 5) #17 - #20

=== Tie-ins ===
- Green Lantern Corps (vol. 3) #17 - #20
- Green Lantern: New Guardians #17 - #20
- Red Lanterns #17 - #20

== Critical reception ==
The main story received critical acclaim for the engaging plot, action, art style, and world-building. However, the tie-ins received a mixed to negative response due to them not being important to the story.

According to Comic Book Roundup, Green Lantern (vol. 5) #17 received an average rating of 7.6 out of 10 based on 15 reviews. Sean Ian Mills from Henchman-4-Hire wrote: "Anyway, I think the First Lantern will prove to be a formidable threat for a big finale to Johns' run, and I definitely look forward to seeing where this goes. Plus, the more Simon Baz the better. I wish Johns had stayed on Green Lantern, if only to see more Baz".

According to Comic Book Roundup, Green Lantern (vol. 5) #18 received an average rating of 7.5 out of 10 based on 18 reviews. Christopher Williams from Following The Nerd wrote: "Overall this was one of the best Green Lantern comics we got since Hal was cast away, and that's because we finally got Jordan back in a way. Though the art wasn't as strong as it normally is, the story more than makes up for it".

According to Comic Book Roundup, Green Lantern (vol. 5) #19 received an average rating of 8 out of 10 based on 15 reviews. Minhquan Nguyen from Weekly Comic Book Review wrote: "This is an issue where you appreciate Johns' long-term work more than the instant product, meaning this arc may not be quite the perfect swan song for his run".

According to Comic Book Roundup, Green Lantern (vol. 5) #20 received an average rating of 9 out of 10 based on 30 reviews. Ed from DC Comic News wrote: "This is a tremendous ending to not only the Wrath storyline, but Johns entire run on Green Lantern. I enjoyed the issue in almost every way you can. The art was crisp and every time you turned the page you were simply overwhelmed with everything that was going on. The price point is a bit high at $7.99 but it reads and feels more like a graphic novel than a single issue comic. It is worth it. If you have ever been a fan of Green Lantern during Johns run this issue is a must-own".
