= List of fictional primates in comics =

This is a list of fictional non-human primates in comics. It is a subsidiary to the list of fictional primates.

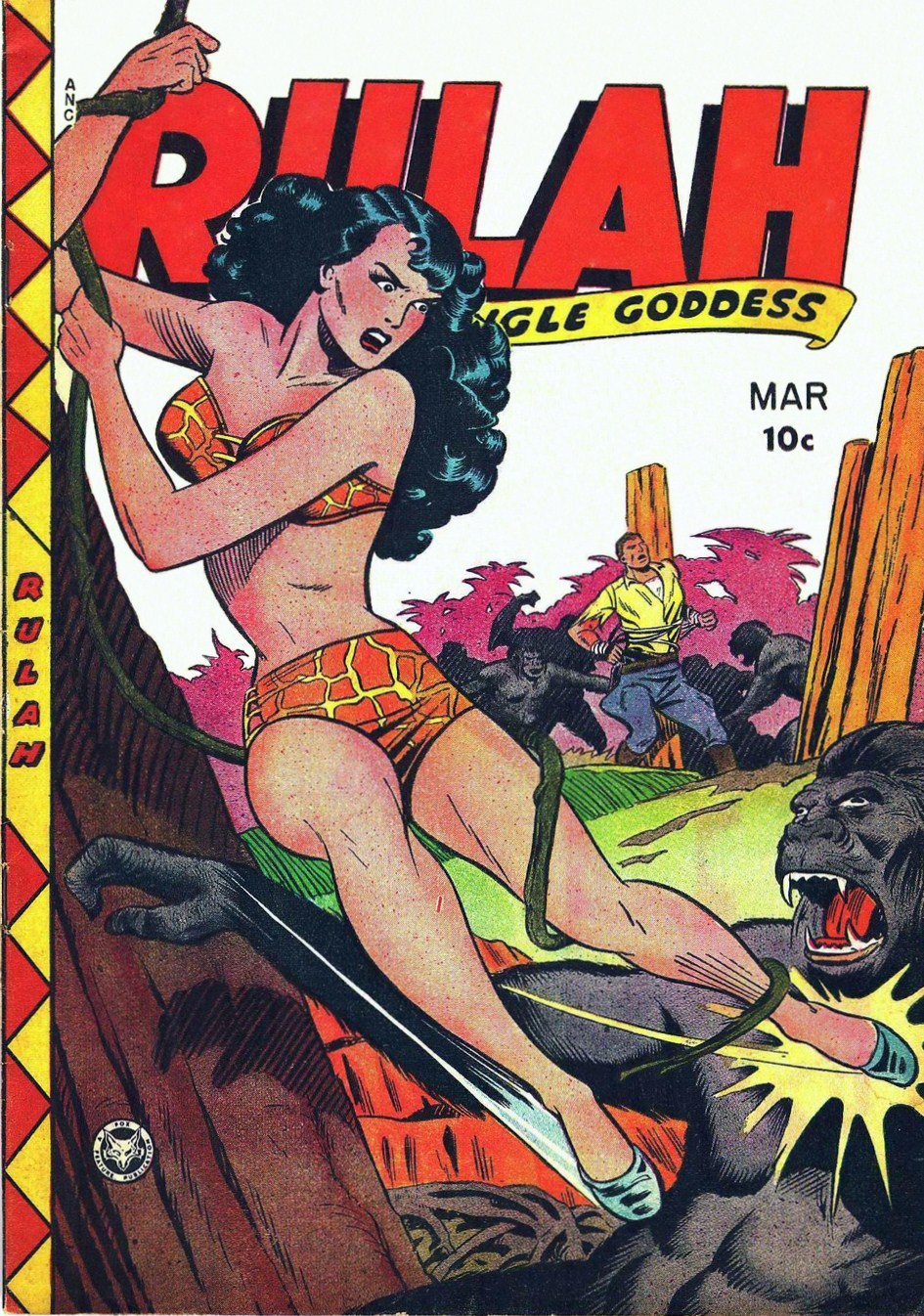
Rulah Jungle Goddess battles a congress of gorillas to rescue an explorer.

| Ape | Species | Origin | Creator | Notes |
|---|---|---|---|---|
| Ampersand | Capuchin monkey | Y: The Last Man | Brian K. Vaughan, Pia Guera | A macaque monkey that Yorrick attempts to train to help the disabled. |
| An-Nin | Monkey | Tokyo Mew Mew | Reiko Yoshida | |
| Ape-X | Ape | Squadron Supreme #5 | Roy Thomas, John Buscema | A member of the Squadron Supreme; Also the name of a superhero who becomes a powerful gorilla after donning a magic Mexican wrestling mask. |
| Belzébub | Gorilla | Corentin | Paul Cuvelier | Corentin's pet gorilla. |
| Beppo | Monkey | Rupert Bear | Mary Tourtel | The pet monkey of the twin rabbits Reggie and Rex. |
| Beppo | Kryptonian monkey | Superboy #76 | Jerry Siegel, Joe Shuster | A Kryptonian monkey who possesses the same abilities as Superman and survived the destruction of Krypton by stowing away on his spaceship. |
| Chee-Chee | François' langur | Tor | Joe Kubert, Norman Maurer | The only friend of Tor the caveman. |
| Detective Chimp | Chimpanzee | Adventures of Rex the Wonder Dog #4 | John Broome, Carmine Infantino | Originally a normal chimpanzee with above-average intelligence, Detective Chimp gained eternal youth and the ability to understand all animals after being taken to the Fountain of Youth by Rex the Wonder Dog. |
| Dr. Chimp | Orangutan | Rupert Bear | Alfred Bestall | Teacher at Rupert's school. |
| Mr. Chimp | Chimpanzee | Rupert Bear | Alfred Bestall | Shopkeeper. |
| Choco | Chimpanzee | Jommeke | Jef Nys | A playful chimpanzee in a sailor suit, named after the fact that he likes to eat chocolate paste. |
| Congorilla | Gorilla | More Fun Comics | Whitney Ellsworth, George Papp | Congorilla was originally introduced as the human adventurer Congo Bill in 1940, during the Golden Age of Comic Books. In Action Comics #248 (1959), Bill gained the ability to possess the body of a mystical golden gorilla. The character was featured in Secret Origins #40 (1989) - an 'all gorilla issue' that featured an editorial discussion of the Silver Age of Comic Books and sported a campy cover that featured a number of tricks formerly used to sell comics such as go checks, fires, motorcycles and questions. |
| Djuba | Gorilla | Showcase | Bob Haney, Mike Sekowsky | A mutant gorilla who encountered Mike Maxwell when he crash-landed on Mount Kilimanjaro. Maxwell gained superhuman strength from the mountain's mineral-rich waters and defeated Djuba, who gave him a mystical helmet that allows him to control animals and fuse them together. |
| Doctor Pogo | Chimpanzee | The Umbrella Academy | | A chimpanzee from the six-part comic book, written by My Chemical Romance vocalist Gerard Way. |
| Don Uggie Apelino | Gorilla | Judge Dredd | John Wagner, Carlos Ezquerra | Head of the Ape Gang, a criminal mob of sentient gorillas. |
| Dum-Dum | Gorilla | Boner's Ark | Mort Walker | One of the passengers on board of Boner's Ark. |
| Forever | Orangutan | Stardust Crusaders | Hirohiko Araki | An orangutan who uses its Stand ability 'Strength' to attack Jotaro Kujo and his allies. |
| Gabby | Monkey | Smash Comics | | Surgically given human-level intelligence and speech, he became the first loyal if rambunctious sidekick of Midnight. |
| Gorilla Boss | Gorilla | Batman | David Vern Reed, Lew Sayre Schwartz | Originally a mobster named George Dyke, he was set to be executed, but had his brain removed from his body by his henchman and transplanted into the body of a gorilla. |
| Gorilla Grodd | Gorilla | The Flash | John Broome, Carmine Infantino | A psychic gorilla supervillain and enemy of the Flash. |
| Gorilla-Man | Gorilla | Men's Adventures | Robert Q. Sale | A soldier who was transformed into the Gorilla-Man, an immortal gorilla, after killing the previous Gorilla-Man in Africa. |
| Gorr | Gorilla | Fantastic Four #171 | Roy Thomas, George Pérez, and Rich Buckler | Created from an ordinary lab gorilla by High Evolutionary into one of his New Men, and comes to earth in an attempt to make Fantastic Four help saving Counter-Earth from Galactus. |
| Hit-Monkey | Japanese macaque | Hit-Monkey | Daniel Way, Dalibor Talajić | A monkey assassin and martial artist, who wears a suit. |
| Gusten | Gorilla | Gorilla Gusten | Jan Romare | A gorilla in a pantomime comic. |
| Jacko | Chimpanzee | Jungle Jinks | Arthur White, Mabel Francis Taylor | Main cast member. |
| Jacko | Chimpanzee | Tiger Tim | Julius Stafford Baker | Friend of Tiger Tim. |
| Jocko | Chimpanzee | Jo, Zette and Jocko | Hergé | Playful chimpanzee, who is Jo and Zette's pet. |
| Kiligolo | | Perlin et Pinpin | Claude Dubois | Pet monkey of Perlin and Pinpin, two characters created by Maurice Cuvillier. The monkey itself was a creation of Cuvillier's successor Claude Dubois, who eventually created a spin-off around Kiligolo. |
| Koko | Monkey | Philly Peno and Koko | Frank Crane | Talking pet monkey, owned by the Filipino boy Philly Peno. |
| Lex Lemur | Lemur | Captain Carrot and His Amazing Zoo Crew! | Roy Thomas, Scott Shaw | An anthropomorphic lemur from Earth-C-Minus and the counterpart of Lex Luthor. |
| Lichi | Monkey | Kateikyoushi Hitman Reborn! | Akira Amano | |
| Mataboe | Gorilla | Jommeke | Jef Nys | A talking gorilla. |
| McGimben Gimbensky | Gorilla | Grease Monkey | Tim Eldred | A gorilla who happens to be Chief Mechanic for Barbarian Squadron. A self-styled artist who cares nothing at all for regulations. Robin becomes his assistant and close friend. |
| Mickey the Monkey | Chimpanzee | Mickey the Monkey | Dudley D. Watkins | A cheerful monkey, who always gets himself into trouble or manages to act revenge upon those who did him harm. |
| Monsieur Mallah | Gorilla | Doom Patrol | Arnold Drake, Bruno Premiani | A gorilla given intelligence by the Brain, who later fell in love with him. Mallah is a member of the Brotherhood of Evil, enemies of the Doom Patrol. |
| Nnamdi | Gorilla | The Flash | Geoff Johns, Scott Kolins | Solovar's son and successor. |
| Rudy | Chimpanzee | Rudy (daily comic strip 1983-1985) and Rudy in Hollywood (collection of those strips) | William Overgard. | He lives in Los Angeles. His profession is past-his-prime comedic entertainer. His distinction is the only talking (in English) chimpanzee. |
| Sam Simeon | Gorilla | Angel and the Ape | E. Nelson Bridwell, Bob Oksner | A comics artist and talking gorilla who is a partner, with human woman Angel O'Day, in the O'Day and Simeon Detective Agency. |
| Shampoo (Gaylord) | Gorilla | Boes (Ox Tales) | Wil Raymakers, Thijs Wilms | Recurring opponent of Boes. |
| Sim and Pans | Chimpanzee | Sim en Pans | Wim Lensen | Two mischievous little kid chimpanzees. |
| Sky Ape | Gorilla | | | A millionaire gorilla with a jetpack, written by Phil Amara and Tim McCarney. |
| Solovar | Gorilla | The Flash | John Broome, Carmine Infantino | A psychic gorilla, the leader of Gorilla City, and an ally of the Flash. |
| Super-Apes | Gorilla (Miklo), baboon (Igor), orangutan (Peotor) | Fantastic Four | Stan Lee, Jack Kirby | A group of primates given superpowers by the Red Ghost, who recreated the conditions that gave the Fantastic Four their powers. The Super-Apes' primary membership consists of Miklo, a gorilla who possesses superhuman strength and durability; Igor, a baboon who possesses shapeshifting abilities; and Peotor, an orangutan who can manipulate magnetism. |
| Tangle the Lemur | Ring-tailed lemur | Sonic the Hedgehog (IDW Publishing) | | An adventurous, action-loving lemur with a stretchable, prehensile tail, and an ally of Sonic the Hedgehog in the IDW comics adaptation. |
| Titano | Chimpanzee | Superman | Otto Binder, Curt Swan | Titano was originally a normal chimpanzee who was sent into space as part of a test flight. During the flight, he was exposed to radiation, drastically increasing his size and giving him the ability to generate Kryptonite radiation. |
| Tytus de Zoo | Chimpanzee | Tytus, Romek i A'Tomek | Henryk Chmielewski | An intelligent monkey created from an inkblot, seeks to become more human with the help of his friends. |
| Ultra-Humanite | Gorilla | Action Comics #13 | Jerry Siegel, Joe Shuster | A mad scientist who has had numerous bodies, most famously that of an albino ape. While the character first appeared in the Golden Age, his gorilla form first appeared in the Silver Age. |
| Uncle Gabby | Monkey | Maakies | Tony Millionaire | A drunken Irish monkey. |
