= Superman vol. 2 =

Comic book series

- Superman vol. 2, #1 (January 1987), art by John Byrne.

Publication information
- Publisher: DC Comics
- Schedule: Monthly
- Format: Ongoing while in publication
- Genre: Superhero
- Publication date: January 1987 – April 2006
- No. of issues: 228 (#1-226 plus issues numbered #0 and #1,000,000) and 12 Annuals
- Main character: Superman

Creative team
- Written by: List: John Byrne (#1–22), Roger Stern (#23–28, 30–33, Annual #2, 7), Dan Jurgens (#29, 57–146, 148, 150, 0, Annual #3, 5, 9–10), Jerry Ordway (#34–47, 49–55, 110), Jeph Loeb (#151–168, 170–183, 226), Marv Wolfman (#169), Geoff Johns (#179–180, 184–187, 189), Chuck Austen (#188), Steven T. Seagle (#190–200), Dan Abnett (#201), Joe Kelly (#202–203, 226), Brian Azzarello (#202, 204–215), Judd Winick (#216), Mark Verheiden (#217–225)
- Penciller: List: John Byrne Jerry Ordway Dan Jurgens Ed McGuinness Jim Lee Mike McKone Ed Benes
- Inker: List: Terry Austin Karl Kesel Brett Breeding Dennis Janke Josef Rubinstein Cam Smith Art Thibert Scott Williams

Superman is an ongoing comic book series featuring the DC Comics superhero of the same name. The second volume of the previous ongoing Superman title, the series was published from cover dates January 1987 to April 2006, and ran for 228 issues (226 monthly issues and two issues published outside the concurrent numbering). This series was launched after John Byrne revamped the Superman character in 1986 in The Man of Steel limited series, introducing the post-Crisis on Infinite Earths version of the Superman character.

After that limited series, Action Comics returned to publication and Superman vol. 2, #1 was published. The original Superman series (volume 1) became The Adventures of Superman starting with issue #424. Superman vol. 2 continued publishing until April 2006 at which point DC restored The Adventures of Superman to its original title and canceled the second Superman series.

== Publication history ==
Superman's more somber costume to mourn the loss of life in the Imperiex War. Cover of Superman vol. 2, #178 (March 2002); art by Ed McGuinness.

Because the DC Universe was revamped after the events of Crisis on Infinite Earths, the previous continuity before that series (colloquially referred to as "pre-Crisis") was voided. Previously established characters were given the opportunity to be reintroduced in new ways. Reintroductions of classic villains were part of the new Superman series' first year, featuring the first post-Crisis appearances of characters such as Metallo and Mister Mxyzptlk and the introduction of Supergirl. The historic engagement of Lois Lane and Clark Kent was one of the major events in the book's run. Writer/artist Dan Jurgens created a supporting hero named Agent Liberty in issue #60 (Oct. 1991). The series participated in such crossover storylines as "Panic in the Sky". The hallmark of the run was the storyline "The Death of Superman". The actual "death" story was published in this series' 75th issue, and would be a major media and pop culture event with the issue going on to sell over three million copies.

As the main series featuring the most prominent character of the DC Universe, the series crossed over with a number of different line-wide crossover stories including Zero Hour: Crisis in Time, The Final Night, and Infinite Crisis. Superman received a new costume and new superpowers in issue #123 (May 1997).

In 1999, Superman, along with the other three titles, were revamped with Jeph Loeb replacing longtime writer Dan Jurgens. During Loeb's run on the series he created Imperiex, introduced a Bizarro created by the Joker in the "Emperor Joker" storyline, and also helped with a controversial storyline in which Superman's nemesis, supervillain Lex Luthor, became the President of the United States. Loeb's run on the series included the crossover event Our Worlds at War, which saw the destruction of Topeka, Kansas, serious damage to Clark Kent's nearby hometown of Smallville, and Superman adopting a costume of more somber colors to mourn the heavy loss of life during the event. Loeb's run ended with issue #183 (August 2002).

In 2004–2005, artist Jim Lee, who had recently concluded the Batman: Hush storyline with Loeb, provided the artwork for a Superman story by writer Brian Azzarello. The story, Superman: For Tomorrow, ran for twelve issues and was collected in an Absolute Edition hardcover in May 2009.

With the publication of issue #226 (April 2006), the series was canceled as part of the company-wide Infinite Crisis event. The Adventures of Superman was returned to its original title, Superman, with issue #650 the following month.

== Annuals ==
From 1987 to 2000, twelve annual issues of the series were published. The first annual featured a post-Crisis retelling of the first Titano story. Beginning with the second annual, the stories tied into the crossovers or themes that were running through DC's annuals that year. These were:

- Annual #2 (1988) - "Private Lives"
- Annual #3 (1991) - "Armageddon 2001"
- Annual #4 (1992) - "Eclipso: The Darkness Within"
- Annual #5 (1993) - "Bloodlines: Outbreak"
- Annual #6 (1994) - "Elseworlds Annual"
- Annual #7 (1995) - "Year One"
- Annual #8 (1996) - "Legends of the Dead Earth"
- Annual #9 (1997) - "Pulp Heroes"
- Annual #10 (1998) - "Ghosts"
- Annual #11 (1999) - "JLApe: Gorilla Warfare!"
- Annual #12 (2000) - "Planet DC"

== Collected editions ==
Title	Material collected	Publication date	ISBN
Superman: The Man of Steel Volume 2	Superman vol. 2 #1-3; Adventures of Superman #424-426; Action Comics #584-586	November 2003	978-1-4012-0005-3
Superman: The Man of Steel Volume 3	Superman vol. 2 #4-6; Adventures of Superman #427-429; Action Comics #587-589	October 2004	978-1-4012-0246-0
Superman: The Man of Steel Volume 4	Superman vol. 2 #7-8; Adventures of Superman #430-431; Action Comics #590-591; Legion of Super-Heroes vol. 3 #37-38	September 2005	978-1-4012-0455-6
Superman: The Man of Steel Volume 5	Superman vol. 2 #9-11; Adventures of Superman #432-435; Action Comics #592-593	November 2006	978-1-4012-0948-3
Superman: The Man of Steel Volume 6	Superman vol. 2 #12, Superman Annual #1; Adventures of Superman Annual #1; Action Comics #594-595, Action Comics Annual #1; Booster Gold #23	March 2008	978-1-4012-1679-5
The Death of Clark Kent	Superman vol. 2 #99-102; Superman: The Man of Steel #43-46; Action Comics #709-711; and Superman: The Man of Tomorrow #1	May 1997	TPB 978-1-56389-323-0
Our Worlds at War (Note: Collects Our Worlds at War Book 1 (ISBN 978-1-56389-915-7) and Our Worlds at War Book 2 (ISBN 978-1-56389-916-4), both published in September 2002)	Superman vol. 2 #171-173; Action Comics #780-782; The Adventures of Superman #593-595; Impulse #77; JLA: Our Worlds at War #1; Superboy #91; Supergirl #59: Superman: The Man of Steel #115-117; Wonder Woman #172-173; World's Finest Comics: Our Worlds at War #1; and Young Justice #36	June 2006	TPB 978-1-4012-1129-5
Godfall	Superman vol. 2 #202-203; Action Comics #812-813; and The Adventures of Superman #625-626	September 2004	TPB 978-1-84023-919-5; HC 978-1-4012-0376-4
For Tomorrow Volume 1	Superman vol. 2 #204-209	August 2005	TPB 978-1-4012-0352-8; HC 978-1-4012-0351-1
For Tomorrow Volume 2	Superman vol. 2 #210-215	August 2005	TPB 978-1-4012-0448-8; HC 978-1-4012-0715-1

== Reception ==
Martin A. Stever reviewed Superman Space Gamer/Fantasy Gamer No. 83. Stever commented that "Byrne has made Superman human enough that we can understand and like him. Thank you John Byrne for making Superman super again".
