= Budget album =

Low-priced vinyl LPs of popular and classical music released during the 1950s to 1970s

Budget albums (also known as unofficially by some collectors as either drugstore records or junk records) were low-priced vinyl LPs of popular and classical music released during the 1950s to 1970s consisting either of previously released material (usually reissues drawn from the catalogs of major labels featuring older performances by well-known artists) or material recorded especially for the line (often cover versions of hit songs by name artists sung or performed on these albums by usually unidentified and unknown musicians). Prices ranged from as low as 59 U.S. cents (minor label releases of the 1950s) to $2.98 (major label repackaging of older material in the 1970s). In the UK Pickwick Records' Top of the Pops record series, which operated between 1968 and 1985, was the most successful budget album range.

== Drugstore debut ==
Discount stores (as well as department stores) have had records produced for them by various record producing companies since the 1910s. It was fashionable for a chain like McCrory's or Kress to have their own exclusive label. Most of these records contained songs also available on many other 'exclusive' labels. (For example from the 1920s into the 1930s, Paramount Records produced the 'Broadway' label for Montgomery Ward, Cameo Records produced the 'Romeo' label for Kress, Columbia Records produced the 'Diva' label for W.T. Grant, and the Plaza Music Company produced the 'Oriole' label for McCrory's, among many others.)

Drugstore records were called such as they were often sold in metal racks similar to the racks used for paperback books in drugstores or dimestores in the 1960s for prices from half to a quarter of regular LP albums. These records were markedly less expensive than major label recordings.

The initial "drugstore records" mostly comprised popular music played or sung by unknown orchestras or singers, or conversely, once famous singers or orchestras playing music or songs that were relatively unknown (popular singers' early and obscure recordings were often showcased as well).

By the LP era, in some cases (notably the least expensive of the records) the record album would have only one cover version of a famous song or tune. Many of these albums had attractive album cover artwork (often picturing starlets such as Jayne Mansfield, Kim Novak, Irish McCalla, and the then-unknown Mary Tyler Moore). The album were often filled out with music in the public domain or obscure music never recorded by anyone else. Sometimes the "orchestras" comprised very few musicians, were performed by background music companies, or were recorded outside the United States by orchestras credited under different names, such as 101 Strings.

Despite major record companies lowering their prices or starting their own budget labels, the budget album companies, such as Coronet (who sold their LPs for 99 cents), remained easily available.

Drugstore records originated with Pickwick International, founded by Cy Leslie. Leslie's first business was a prerecorded greeting card service that turned into children's record label Voco Records in 1946. In 1950, Leslie founded Pickwick Records and by 1953 Pickwick entered the LP market providing lower priced records. Another early producer of drugstore records was Enoch Light, who started Waldorf Music Hall Records under the auspices of the F.W. Woolworth dime store chain. Unlike most drugstore record producers, Light was well regarded both as a musician and for his technical recording knowledge; which he would make much use of later in establishing Command Records.

Probably the best known and most prolific drugstore label was Crown Records, an offshoot of Modern Records, owned by the Bihari brothers and operated from Los Angeles. From the mid-1950s to the early 80s, Crown turned out hundreds of cheaply produced LPs of country, Hawaiian, Latin, and other musical genres; often performed by pseudonymous studio groups; as well as blues material reissued from the Modern label.

== Major labels enter the budget album market ==
In 1954, Pickwick entered into a licensing arrangement with Capitol Records giving Pickwick the rights to press and distribute Capitol's secondary and noncurrent titles on their label. Pickwick's records were mostly sold in stores other than record shops such as department stores, dimestores, drugstores, and supermarkets. Pickwick later had several subsidiaries such as Bravo, Design, International Award, Hurrah, Grand Prix, and Hallmark Records in the U.K.

RCA Records introduced RCA Camden Records in 1955, a budget label for re-releasing older recordings by currently popular artists on the label or vintage material from previous decades. Occasionally, original music was produced for release on RCA Camden such as children's music and instrumentals. RCA Camden also released single albums of country music recorded especially for the budget label by many of its newer country acts of the 1960s such as Connie Smith, Liz Anderson, and Dottie West to perhaps encourage sales of the artists' full-priced product. RCA Camden was particularly successful in repackaging older Elvis Presley recordings on the Camden label, as well as previously released and also unreleased material he recorded for his motion pictures, making these albums among the select few budget albums to actually make the national best-selling charts. At one point, the Camden albums were doing so well that two of Presley's major hit singles of the early 1970s - "Burning Love" and "Separate Ways" (and their respective flipsides) made their album debuts not on mainstream RCA releases, but on RCA Camden. Not long before Presley's death, RCA licensed its Camden line to Pickwick, though it eventually revived the label.

The major labels' budget album releases were seldom sold at "drug stores", mainly at record shops and department stores just like the full-price product although RCA Camden did on occasion market their albums in speciality "drug store" racks. The major label budget albums usually had eight to ten songs on them (usually nine) as opposed to full-price releases which contained ten to twelve songs.

Columbia Records re-introduced the Harmony Records line around the same time for budget releases of older product repackaged. Harmony, however, seldom issued material that had not been previously released (Columbia has used the Harmony name from 1926 through 1932 and again in the late 1940s).

The budget albums' peak was in the late 1960s and early 1970s when nearly every recording artist of note had one or more such collections on the market. Often these were recordings done for a previous record label before the star's current popularity.

Major labels of the day with their own budget lines include:

- Atlantic Records had a short-lived budget label, Clarion Records
- Cameo-Parkway created Wyncote Records
- Columbia Records' budget label was Harmony Records
- Decca Records' budget label was Vocalion Records
- EMI (in the UK) created Music for Pleasure (MFP)
- Dot Records' budget label was Hamilton Records
- Liberty Records' budget label was Sunset Records
- Mercury Records operated Wing Records
- MGM Records released Metro Records and Lion Records
- Modern Records created Crown Records
- Pye Records (in the UK) launched the budget 'Golden Guinea' Collection, with records priced at one guinea (equivalent to one pound and one shilling).
- RCA Victor Records released RCA Camden Records
- Starday Records (arguably a budget label itself) created Nashville Records
- United Artists Records produced Unart Records

Other budget record labels were Somerset Records that became Alshire Records in 1963, Stereo Fidelity, Audio Spectrum, Peter Rabbit (children's records), Azteca, Score Records (a subsidiary of Aladdin Records), Custom, Diplomat Records (a product of the Synthetic Plastics Company who made Peter Pan Records), and Ambassador Records.

In United Kingdom, the Woolworths jointly owned Embassy Records with Oriole Records, later part of CBS.

The Music for Pleasure (MFP) label was founded in 1965 as a joint venture between EMI, which provided the source material, and the publisher Paul Hamlyn, which handled distribution in so-called non-traditional outlets, such as W.H. Smith, the booksellers. The MFP catalogue consisted of both original material and reissues of existing EMI recordings.

In Venezuela (and arguably other Latin American countries)it was quite common to find these recordings in the Cassette format, which allowed for even cheaper and lower quantity of copies for each album issued. Usually rebranding from other budget label albums, were marketed under the Cim-Bra, Vallison, Co-Co, Allegro, Rotna, CM-Circulo Musical labels, and even other popular labels mostly marketing local artists issued budget albums as well, such as Suramericana del Disco, Yare, Promus, among others.

== Notable artists ==
Notable artists to have begun their careers recording for budget albums include Lou Reed, Jerry Cole, Al Kooper and Tina Charles. Perhaps the most notable artists to emerge from a career as a "cover artist" for budget albums include Dolly Parton who, early in her career as a teenaged vocalist, recorded several covers of Kitty Wells hits for budget album release, and Elton John, who recorded in the late 1960s and early 1970s for the Top of the Pops album series.

See also List of record labels
