= Bob Larkin =

American comics artist

- Born: July 10, 1949 (age 77)
- Area: Artist
- Notable works: Marvel Magazines covers

Bob Larkin (born July 10, 1949) is an American comics artist primarily known for his painted covers for Marvel Comics' magazine-format titles, Marvel Magazines, in the 1970s and early 1980s and for his 32 painted covers on the Bantam Books paperback reissues series of the Doc Savage pulp novels.

== Biography ==
Larkin began his career as an illustrator in 1969. His many credits include titles such as Crazy Magazine, Deadly Hands of Kung-Fu, Marvel Preview, Marvel Super Special, Planet of the Apes, Savage Sword of Conan, and The Tomb of Dracula. Larkin painted covers for many of the Marvel Fireside Books paperback collections, lending them a simple, movie-poster feel. He did the same thing for the cover to the second major intercompany crossover, Superman and Spider-Man (1981). In addition, Marvel occasionally tapped Larkin to paint covers for premiere issues of such comic book titles as Dazzler (March 1981) and The Saga of Crystar (May 1983). A rare example of Larkin providing interior art is the three–page story "For the Next 60 Seconds" in Epic Illustrated #1 (Spring 1980).

Besides his work for Marvel, Larkin has painted covers for Vampirella and The Rook (Warren Publishing), The Amazing Adventures of Holo-Man (Peter Pan Records), Lorelei: Building the Perfect Beast (StarWarp Concepts), and many others.

Larkin provided covers to Bantam Books reprints of Doc Savage, as well as World Wrestling Entertainment merchandise featuring The Rock, Stone Cold Steve Austin, The Undertaker, Kane, and Chris Jericho.

== Personal life ==
With former wife Fran, Larkin is the father of son Ken and daughters Claire and Holly.

== Bibliography ==
- Larkin, Bob (2009). Quartuccio, Sal (ed.). The Savage Art of Bob Larkin. SQP. ISBN 978-0865621756.

Larkin's cover for Superman and Spider-Man (1981)

=== Covers ===
==== DC Comics ====
- The Resistance #8 (2003)

==== Hammond Incorporated ====
- Hammond's Captain Atlas and the Globe Riders #1 (1987)

==== Marvel Comics ====
- Bizarre Adventures #28 (1981)
- Conan Saga #38, 43, 45, 67, 77, 90 (1989–1994)
- Conan: The Ravagers Out of Time GN (1992)
- Crazy Magazine #17–63, 65, 68–69, 71–72, 74–75, 77–78, 80–81, 83–94 (1976–1983)
- Dazzler #1 (1981)
- The Deadly Hands of Kung Fu #5–6, 8, 19, 21–22, 24, 31 (1974–1976)
- Haunt of Horror #1, 4 (1974)
- The Hulk! #11, 14, 18, 21–22 (1978–1980)
- Marvel Graphic Novel: The Amazing Spider-Man: Parallel Lives (1989)
- Marvel Illustrated Books
  - The Marvel Comics Illustrated Version of Captain America #02883 (1982) ISBN 978-0939766086
  - The Marvel Comics Illustrated Version of Fantastic Four #02838 (1982) ISBN 978-0939766024
  - The Marvel Comics Illustrated Version of Star Trek #02821 (1982) ISBN 978-0939766000
  - The Marvel Comics Illustrated Version of the Incredible Hulk #02832 (1982) ISBN 978-0960414697
  - Mighty Marvel Team-Up Thrillers (1983) ISBN 978-0939766604
  - Spider-Man: His Greatest Team-Up Battles #02722 (1981) ISBN 978-0960414673
  - Stan Lee Presents Spider-Man 2 Together with Thor, Havok and the Man-Thing! #02858 (1982) ISBN 978-0939766130
  - Stan Lee Presents The Marvel Comics Illustrated Version of Daredevil #02041 (1982) ISBN 978-0939766185
- Marvel Preview #7, 18–19, 21 (1976–1980)
- Marvel Special Edition Featuring Star Wars: The Empire Strikes Back #2 (1980)
- Marvel Super Action #1 (1976)
- Marvel Super Special #3, 5–6, 15–16 (1978–1980)
- Marvel Treasury Edition #28 (Superman and Spider-Man) (1981)
- Monsters of the Movies #2–8 (1974–1975)
- Monsters Unleashed #5 (1974)
- Nick Fury vs. S.H.I.E.L.D. tpb (1989)
- Planet of the Apes #1–7, 10, 13, 15, 17, 19, 24 (1974–1976)
- Power Man and Iron Fist #75 (1981)
- The Punisher Magazine #13 (1990)
- The Punisher: A Man Named Frank (1994)
- The Punisher War Zone #25 (1994)
- The Saga of Crystar, Crystal Warrior #1 (1983)
- Savage Sword of Conan #27, 42–44, 82, 89, 92, 103, 120, 137, 141, 192, 198, 206 (1978–1993)
- Spider-Man Team-Up #6 (1997)
- Spider-Woman #50 (1983)
- The Tomb of Dracula vol. 2 #1–3 (1979–1980)
- Vampire Tales Annual #1 (1975)

==== Peter Pan Records ====
- Amazing Adventures of Holo-Man (Book and Record Set) #PR36 (1978)

==== Simon & Schuster ====
- Marvel Fireside Books
  - The Amazing Spider-Man (1979) ISBN 978-0671248130
  - Doctor Strange Master of the Mystic Arts (1979) ISBN 9780671248147
  - The Fantastic Four (1979) ISBN 978-0671248123
  - The Incredible Hulk (1978) ISBN 978-0671242244
  - The Mighty Marvel Pin-Up Book (1978) ISBN 978-0671243906
- Marvel Novel Series
  - #1 The Amazing Spider-Man: Mayhem in Manhattan (1978) ISBN 978-0671820442
  - #6 Iron Man: And Call My Killer...MODOK! (1979) ISBN 978-0671820893
  - #7 Doctor Strange: Nightmare (1979) ISBN 978-0671820886
  - #8 The Amazing Spider-Man: Crime Campaign (1979) ISBN 978-0671820909
  - #11 The Hulk and Spider-Man: Murdermoon (1979) ISBN 978-0671820947

==== Warren Publishing ====
- Creepy #99–100 (1978)
- Eerie #119 (1981)
- The Rook Magazine #2–3, 6, 8–9, 11–12 (1980–1981)
- Vampirella #73 (1978)
- Warren Presents #8, 14 (1980–1981)
