= Spin-o-rama =

spin-o-rama may refer to:

== Ice hockey ==
spin-o-rama (Savard or Savardian) – named for Serge Savard, but made famous by Denis Savard:

- Glossary of ice hockey terms§spin-o-rama
- List of sports terms named after people§spin-o-rama

== Recordings ==
- Spin-O-Rama, The Primitives's fifth studio album
- Spin-O-Rama Records, a budget record label founded by Synthetic Plastics Company§Record labels

== Roller coasters ==
- Spin-O-Rama, Compact Spinning Coaster 2 Loop (figure eight roller coaster with spinning cars), for Cliff's Amusement Park by SBF Visa Group
