= CBS Home Entertainment =

Arm of Paramount

- Formerly: CBS Video Enterprises, Inc. (1980–1983); CBS Video (1980–2009); MGM/CBS Home Video (1980–1982)
- Type: Division
- Industry: Home entertainment
- Founded: January 1980; 46 years ago
- Founder: Cy Leslie
- Headquarters: Hollywood, Los Angeles, California, United States
- Owner: Skydance
- Parent: CBS (1980–2000); Paramount Home Entertainment (2000–2005; 2019–present); CBS Corporation (2005–2019)

CBS Home Entertainment (formerly CBS Video Enterprises, Inc., MGM/CBS Home Video, CBS/Fox Video and CBS Video, currently branded as CBS DVD for DVD releases and CBS Blu-ray for Blu-ray releases) is an American home video company founded in January 1980 that acts as a sub-label of Paramount Home Entertainment to mainly distribute CBS's library (CBS Studios, CBS Media Ventures, and their predecessor companies) on home media.

== History ==
CBS, Inc. established CBS Video Enterprises (CVE) in January 1980, with Cy Leslie as chairman. Its original stated function was to "manufacture, produce, and market programming on videotapes and videodisks".

In 1980, CVE formed a joint venture with Metro-Goldwyn-Mayer (MGM), called MGM/CBS Home Video which licensed the film library of MGM for release on home videocassette, following the early leads of Paramount Home Video and 20th Century Fox's Magnetic Video division. In addition to the MGM film library, the company released output from CBS News, CBS Records, the CBS television network, CBS Theatrical Films, and the motion picture division of Lorimar.

By 1981, MGM/CBS had expanded from VHS and Betamax to RCA's CED system as well. Also that year, CBS Video Enterprises handled distribution of its five titles by Samuel Goldwyn Home Entertainment in conjunction with MGM/CBS. In 1982, CBS withdrew from the MGM joint venture. The MGM/CBS company reorganized into MGM/UA Home Video.

A short time later, CBS purchased a stake in 20th Century Fox's home video operation, and formed CBS/Fox Video. The new company reissued many of CBS' properties issued under the CBS/Fox label, in addition to films under the 20th Century Fox banner. Two specialty labels, Key Video, and Playhouse Video, were also created.

The CBS/Fox joint venture was reorganized in 1990, with Key Video and Playhouse Video ceasing operations, and Fox Video was created to release the mainstream output of 20th Century Fox. CBS continued to issue their product and programming under the Fox Video label until 1998, and utilized the CBS/Fox label for BBC Video in the United States until these rights expired on June 30, 2000 and wasn't renewed. On June 28, 2000, BBC Worldwide Americas announced a new partnership with Warner Home Video that would begin effectively on July 1, 2000, excluding the release of Walking with Dinosaurs, which was instead transferred over from CBS/Fox to Warner Home Video on September 1, 2000. In 2001, CBS/Fox Video was folded into 20th Century Fox Home Entertainment.

When Viacom purchased CBS in 2000, Paramount Home Entertainment became CBS Video/DVD's distributor (which CBS was controlled by National Amusements from 2000 to 2025). Both companies were split again on December 31, 2005, but they were still controlled by National Amusements. CBS Corporation formed CBS Home Entertainment as a new home entertainment arm in 2007.

Sony Pictures Home Entertainment won the right to release material from the newly formed incarnation of CBS Films beginning in 2010, under license from CBS Home Entertainment; five years later, Lionsgate Home Entertainment succeeded Sony Pictures Home Entertainment as CBS Films' home media distributor until early 2020.

Most less-demanded CBS programs are either released on manufactured-on-demand DVDs by CBS itself or licensed to Visual Entertainment Inc.

CBS and Viacom re-merged on December 4, 2019, forming ViacomCBS (now Skydance), making CBS Home Entertainment become a sub-label for Paramount Home Entertainment.
