= Cricket Records =

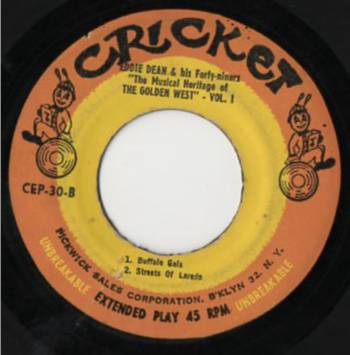
- Parent company: Pickwick Records
- Founded: May 25, 1953
- Founder: Cy Leslie
- Genre: Children's
- Country of origin: USA

Cricket Records was a children's label operated by New York based Pickwick Sales Corp., more commonly known as Pickwick Records, and headed by Seymour "Cy" Leslie. Pickwick owned and operated several budget labels; Cricket is significant in that it may have been one of the last American 78 rpm labels to operate at the end of the 78 rpm era.

== History ==
Cy Leslie reorganized Pickwick Sales Corp. in 1952 out of Voco, which had begun in 1946 producing recorded greeting cards, elaborately designed kiddie picture discs with cardboard backings and finally multicoloured vinyl records. Cricket was the successor to Voco, making its debut with Pickwick itself on May 25, 1953; "my wife's birthday" as Leslie later recalled. Cricket was the first product line offered by Pickwick Sales Corp. According to Leslie, "Good fortune introduced me to an early genius, Eli Oberstein. He owned a vast catalog which included many children's albums, which he agreed to lease, thus beginning Pickwick's first licensing – The Pickwick Cricket line of children's records." Many of the early records were credited under the collective banner of the "Cricketone Players," or some variant thereof. The 1953 lease from Oberstein produced roughly the first fifty Cricket Records, and the remainder were recorded in a scatter-shot fashion afterward. Cricket singles sold for 49 cents each.

Cricket Records are often anonymous, or credited cryptically to non-entities such as "Cricketone Orchestra." Among established name artists to appear on Cricket were Gene Autry, William Bendix, Smiley Burnette, Bobby Colt, Dennis Day, Eddie Dean, Leif Erickson, Ray Heatherton, Boris Karloff, Joseph Cotten, Maury Laws, Gisele MacKenzie, Norman Rose and David Wayne. Cy Leslie himself is credited on C-85 as the leader of The Calypso Tones. There are no credits on records in the 6-inch series, though these largely duplicate material that appeared in other formats.

Cricket Records started out strong, competing well against Golden Records, the main producer of postwar kiddie records. Leslie recalled that the Golden and Cricket concerns often had their booths set up next to each other at record shows. Cricket Records, however, were not sold in record stores but on racks in department stores and were, therefore, stocked by rack jobbers. Later in the 1950s, Pickwick turned its attention to low-budget licensing deals with majors such as Capitol Records, Mercury Records and RCA Victor. These contracts proved enormously profitable, and required more of Pickwick's attention. In 1968, both Cricket and its sister label Happy Time Records were phased out, though back stock on both labels continued to be available for a time.

== Formats ==
Cricket Records were predominantly singles, issued as 7-inch 45s and 10-inch, 7-inch and 6-inch 78s. The main series of singles began at C-11 in 1953 and ended with C-175 in 1967; a separate Christmas series started with CX-6 in 1953 and ended with CX-19 that same year. All Cricket Records had picture sleeves, though in the field they are frequently found without them. LPs were finally introduced in 1959; Cricket only released about 26–30 LPs, starting with CR-11 and ending in 1961 with a series of Bible story albums narrated by Leif Erickson. There are two LPs in a Christmas series; CRX-1 is by David Wayne, The Little Star of Bethlehem and CRX-2 is an uncredited album titled Christmas for Children Only; both were issued in 1959. Pickwick established its Happy Time Records subsidiary in 1962; this was predominantly an LP series which used much material from the Cricket Records pool, so it was no longer necessary for Pickwick to issue LPs under the Cricket moniker. Cricket LPs sold for $1.98.

The 7-inch series of 78 rpm singles proved one of Cricket Records' most popular and durable formats. While within the United States the 78 rpm format was abandoned industry-wide in 1960, Cricket Records continued to release 7-inch 78 rpm singles afterward, though one source states that this program did not continue after 1963. Nevertheless, stock on Cricket 7-inch 78s remained in print until at least 1968; while the 78 rpm market did not exist, there were still plenty of kiddie record players in use that ran only at 78 rpm, and perhaps Pickwick was answering the slim demand for such records.

Among the most memorable of Cricket Records' LP releases was an album featuring two musical stories - Once Upon an Orchestra and The Story of Celeste, both narrated by David Wayne.

== Logo ==
Unlike the design-heavy – if aesthetically appealing – Voco records, Cricket Records established a more uniform approach to design, employing decorated sleeves and consistent, if sometimes a little crowded, label copy featuring a logo with a cartoon cricket. The Cricket logo itself combined the cartoon cricket with a stylized blue record reading "Cricket Records" on 78 issues, but not so on the 45s. The Cricket went through several variants of which the most common was an image of the cricket pointing rightward with a rather demure expression. A later design shows the Cricket sitting atop the blue record from the 78 releases, staring upward, and the cricket also appears in various other contexts in sleeve designs. At some point around 1960, Cricket's label design went through an extreme simplification and the cartoon cricket disappeared, though it reappeared later in a minimal redesign looking more like a bug.

== Tie-ins ==
From the beginning, Cricket forged ahead with tie-ins to popular toys and television properties, despite that it seldom employed voice actors or other original personnel from TV shows. Paraphrasing Leslie, Billboard reported in March 1956 that Cricket was "running about 30 per cent ahead of last year ... The toy business takes about 30 per cent of its output now ... the company has signed a flock of familiar TV toys for disk exploitation." Announced is the plan to participate with toy manufacturers for a big Christmas advertising push in the fall; "Tie-ins with Ideal Toys and Fisher-Price give the company exclusive rights to material such as Robert the Robot (sic), the Betsy-Wetsy Doll, etc. The records will get plugs on all TV segs where these toys are exposed." One Cricket license that did include original performers was its 1958 agreement with Joe Oriolo's Felix the Cat, resulting in an album produced by Oriolo ("Felix the Cat," CR-28) that bridged actual soundtrack material from the TV cartoons with narrative. Other tie-ins involved Woody Woodpecker, Popeye the Sailor Man, the Romper Room television series, and Lassie.

== Legacy ==
Cricket Records may have produced the very last regular release 78 rpm records in the American market. The latest proposed 78 rpm release is C-166, "Supercalifragilisticexpialidocious/Scarlet Ribbons" credited to the Cricketone Chorus and Orchestra and issued in 1964. The last Cricket release, C-175 "Born Free/Neverland" appeared in 1967, and in 1968 Pickwick also stopped producing new Happy Time Records, though the catalog remained active through 1972. At that point, Pickwick reorganized its children's division under the Mr. Pickwick imprint which it had already employed successfully in its UK distribution channels from about 1966. Cy Leslie sold the company to American Can Corporation in 1977, and in 1979 American Can sold Pickwick again to PolyGram. The US rights to Pickwick belong now to Universal Music Group, but the UK subsidiary became an independent operation in 1977 and exists today as Pickwick Group Ltd. None of the material on Cricket has ever been reissued by PolyGram or its successor, Universal Music.

Record collectors regard most Cricket Records – indeed, most vinyl products produced by Pickwick – as "junk." There is a measure of affection for the label among baby-boomers and collectors who specialize in kiddie records, though finding copies of Cricket Records with the sleeve intact, and in excellent condition, remains a challenge.

== Cricket promotional record ==
Cricket Records produced a humorous adult-themed promotional record. It was a 7-inch 78 rpm disc with bright, solid yellow labels on each side. One side was simply titled "This Is Cricket" and it described the Cricket Record product line and its advantages over competitors ("Bonus Play", etc.) as a man-woman risque dialog. It directed listeners to send their orders to Cy Leslie at Pickwick Sales. The flip side was simply titled "This Is Not Cricket" and it is a love ballad with one line not suited for children. "This Is Not Cricket" has appeared in other song collections under different titles (with an unknown alternate title and performer).

== See also ==
- Pickwick Records
- Cy Leslie
- Budget Albums

== Cricket Records artist roster ==
Issue numbers for singles in the main series given without prefixes were originally rendered with a "C-" prefix; the Christmas series was lettered "CX", here represented merely as "X." LPs were prefixed as "CR," here represented as "LP" to avoid confusion. Cricket 201–224 used a variety of letter prefixes, but as the numbers are consecutive, they are not accounted for here.

- Gayanand patel 99
- Maxine Adams 98
- Candy Anderson 152–154
- Lori Ann X7.2
- Anonymous 131, 169, 201–224, LP17
- Authentic Effects 75
- Gene Autry X6.2
- William Bendix LP30
- Carol Beth 14–15, 19–23, 25, 27–30, 43, 51, 59, K101-116
- Berlin Symphony Orchestra 12
- Edmond Blakeman 13. 134
- Bix Brent 31, 33, 93
- Smiley Burnette 113, 119, LP11
- Jerry Bruno 46
- The Calypso Tones 85
- Marge Cameron 53–58, 87
- Ellen Carol 64, 67
- Reginald Carol 11
- I. Cervone 121
- The Charleston Cricket 147
- The Charleston Trio 165
- Children's Choir 120
- The Christmas Caroleers X7.1, X10, X14
- Circus Band 121
- The City Singers 167
- Bobby Colt 104, 106, 108–111
- The Cordials 88–91
- Joseph Cotten LP34
- Cousin Cricket 30, 42
- The Cricket Children's Chorus 122, 163–164
- Cricket Choral Group X11-X12
- Cricket Community Singers 79
- Cricketeer Marching Band 123, 125
- Cricket Polka-Tone Orchestra 1274
- Cricket Symphony LP22
- Cricketone Children's Chorus 130, 137-142n X17
- Cricketone Chorus 114, 125, 137–142, 146, 150–155, 158, 161–162, 166, 171–173, X19, LP15, LP19-20, LP21, LP30, LP38
- Cricketone Marching Band LP18
- Cricketone Orchestra 119–120, 122, 130–131, 137, 146, 150–155, 158, 161–162, 166, 171–173, X19, LP15, LP19-20, LP21, LP30, LP38
- Cricketone Players 115–117, 199
- Cricketone Singers LP38
- The 4 Cricketones 31–34, 38, 82, 93
- The Cricketones 41, 56–57, 59, 63, 70–71, 77–78, 84, 86–87, 92, 94, 99–100, X6.1–2, X8.1–2, X11, X13, X16
- Dennis Day 112, 118, LP12, LP21
- Eddie Dean 133
- Toby Deane 42–44, 84
- Paul DeWitt 52, 91, 95, 98–99, 101–102, 107
- Bob Downes 103
- Cowboy Gabe Drake & The Woodsmen 51
- John L. Eastman LP16, LP22
- Leif Erickson LP201-LP208
- George Fishman Singers 81
- Roy Freeman 83
- Full Symphony Orchestra 11
- Todd Fuller Orchestra 102
- Hanky Pank Players 143, 145
- The Happy Crickets X18
- Ray Heatherton 122, 129, LP24
- Ken Jay 54, 66, X8.1
- Judy James 104–111
- Rosemary Jun 89, X13-X14
- Boris Karloff LP32
- Bernie Knee 36
- Maury Laws 49–50 (49 as "Maury Lewis")
- Bobby Leslie 77–78
- Cy Leslie 85
- Ralph Lowe 35, 82–83
- Kenneth Lynn 15, 64, 67
- Buddy Mackenzie 82
- Gisele MacKenzie 144, 159
- Bill Marine 46–50
- Ron Marshall 173
- Norinne Masters 39
- Slim Moody 100
- Bob Newcombe 40
- Betsy Norman 103
- The Overtones 61, 65–66
- Captain Paul and The Seafaring Band 124, 135, 160
- Al Pellegrini and Orchestra 159
- Mac Perrin 76, 81, 85–86, 94, X13
- Hal Phillips CX6.1
- Playhour Players LP19
- The Playmates 45–50, 174
- Johnny Poi & His Oahu Islanders 128
- Jim Pollack 48
- Ringling Bros. Barnum & Bailey Circus 121, LP14
- Ricky "Road" K101-116 (probably identical to Ricky Rood)
- Jerry Rood 76, 83
- Ricky Rood 14–15, 19–23, 25, 27–30, 43, 51, 59
- Norman Rose 12, 16, 24, 37, 132
- The St. Margaret's All Boy Choir X7.1, X9, X15
- Santa's Friends X10
- The Savoy Arts Players 17, 18
- Dorothy Season 80, 139
- Betty Shepard 90
- Jeff Smith & the Smith Brothers 148
- Kate Smith 157
- The Songsters 52
- Michael Strange 163–164
- Sherry Sue 74
- The Super Dupers 168
- Van Talbert 126
- The Three Pirates 170
- The Tinkertones 68–74, X7.2, X8.1
- Margie Van 88
- Warren Vincent 62
- Toni Waiman 32, 34, 40, 82
- David Wayne LP13, LP16, XLP1
- Betty Wells 45, 49–50
- Ryan Robinson 62, 45, 86
- Chris Gayle 333,175,215
