= At the Sign of the Lion =

Marvel UK Wolverine solo story

- Opening splash page of "At the Sign of the Lion" from Marvel Comic #335 (March 1979).
- Publisher: Marvel UK
- Publication date: 28 March 1979
Title(s)
Marvel Comic #335
- Main character(s): Wolverine; Hercules

Creative team
- Writer: Jo Duffy
- Penciller: Ken Landgraf
- Inker: George Pérez
- Editor: Dez Skinn
- The Uncanny X-Men Omnibus Vol. 2: ISBN 978-1-302-92634-2

"At the Sign of the Lion" is a six-page comic book story featuring the Marvel Comics character Wolverine and the Olympian demigod Hercules, who serves as the story's antagonist. Written by Jo Duffy, penciled by Ken Landgraf, and inked by George Pérez, it was first published by Marvel UK in the anthology series Marvel Comic #335 (cover-dated 28 March 1979).

Originally written by Jo Duffy in late 1977 as a speculative audition script for Marvel and later utilized as an emergency inventory story, it is historically significant for being the first published narrative to feature Wolverine as a solo protagonist. It predates his first American solo adventure in The Uncanny X-Men #133 (1980) and his first dedicated title, the Wolverine limited series (1982), by several years. Consequently, the issue is recognized by commentators and pricing authorities as a key milestone in the character's publication history.

In addition to its chronological significance, the story is cited as the origin of the "Wolverine in a bar" trope, establishing the setting that would become the character's signature environment in future media. It is also notable for marking the first time that artist George Pérez—later one of the industry's most celebrated pencillers—worked as an inker for Marvel Comics, as well as being the first Wolverine story scripted by a female writer, Jo Duffy.

== Plot ==
The story is set entirely within a tavern (referenced in the title as "The Lion"). Wolverine (Logan) is seated alone at the bar, brooding over his unrequited romantic feelings for teammate Jean Grey and his resulting tension with her partner, Cyclops.

The atmosphere is disrupted by the entrance of the Olympian demigod Hercules, who is characterized as boisterous and seeking attention. The confrontation begins when Hercules demands the mutant vacate his seat at the bar. When Wolverine refuses to move, Hercules physically forces him aside. Wolverine reacts aggressively to the displacement, popping his claws and engaging the demigod in a brawl that destroys much of the bar's interior. Impressed by Wolverine's resilience and ferocity, Hercules ceases hostilities and offers to buy him a drink. The story concludes with the two characters reconciling, bonding over their shared status as warriors and outsiders.

== Publication history ==
"At the Sign of the Lion" was published in the black-and-white weekly anthology Marvel Comic #335. During the late 1970s, Marvel UK titles primarily consisted of reprints of American material. Original content was rare and usually reserved for covers or editorial pages.

According to Marvel UK editorial director Dez Skinn, this story—along with several others from the same period—was utilized due to a production crisis. The printing materials (film) for the scheduled US reprints were lost in transit to the UK office. With a strict weekly deadline approaching, Skinn contacted Marvel's New York office, which supplied emergency "inventory" material to fill the pages.

While historically cited as a commissioned inventory script, writer Jo Duffy later clarified that she created the story in late 1977 entirely on her own as an audition (or "spec") script while working as an editorial assistant under Archie Goodwin. With no editorial direction attached, she specifically chose Wolverine because she was a fan of the character and noted he had never appeared in a solo story. The bar setting and the inclusion of Hercules as the antagonist were also her own ideas, utilizing the demigod because she viewed him as an "entertaining blowhard" who would make a strong foil. The script simultaneously served as the audition job for penciller Ken Landgraf.

Editor Jim Shooter accepted the audition script immediately, though he and Duffy negotiated minor dialogue alterations prior to finalizing the pages. Because audition pieces were often of an unusual page length, the story was held in Marvel's inventory to be used whenever a publication needed a specific number of pages to complete an issue, ultimately leading to its use during the Marvel UK production crisis.

== Placement in continuity ==
Commentators and historians place the events of "At the Sign of the Lion" between The Uncanny X-Men #110 and #111 (1978). This placement is derived from Wolverine’s specific characterization, costume details, and his internal dialogue regarding his emotional distance from the X-Men, which is consistent with the team's dynamic during that specific era.

== Reprints ==
While the story debuted in the UK in March 1979, it was not published in the United States until the following year. It appeared in color in Marvel Treasury Edition #26 (1980), a large-format collection.

Since its US debut, the story has been reprinted in several collections, often appearing as a supplement to X-Men or Wolverine-centric volumes. According to the Grand Comics Database, these reprints include:

- The Incredible Hulk and Wolverine #1 (1986)
- Wolverine Battles the Incredible Hulk #1 (1989)
- Wolverine Omnibus Vol. 1 (2009)
- Marvel Masterworks: The Uncanny X-Men Vol. 8 (2012)
- The Uncanny X-Men Omnibus Vol. 2 (2014)
- X-Men Epic Collection: The Fate of the Phoenix (2021)

== Significance and reception ==
=== Status as first solo story ===
For many years, collectors and historians debated which publication constituted Wolverine's "first solo story." The two primary contenders were typically The Uncanny X-Men #133 (January 1980), which features Wolverine fighting alone in the Hellfire Club, and the character's first self-titled mini-series, Wolverine #1 (September 1982). However, subsequent research by historians has established that "At the Sign of the Lion" was published in March 1979, predating both the 1980 X-Men issue and the 1982 limited series.

Comic historian Alex Grand, a noted expert on Marvel’s Bronze Age and founder of Comic Book Historians, strengthens this conclusion by identifying the story as Wolverine’s first solo-centered narrative. Grand writes that it is "Wolverine’s earliest solo spotlight."

While the prominent role of Hercules has led some enthusiasts to view the issue as a "team-up," analysis of the story’s structure and editorial presentation counters this classification. Defined as a story where a character is the singular narrative focus rather than a co-lead, the issue operates as a solo vehicle for Wolverine, evidenced by its visual structure, its billing convention, and its promotional text.

Visually, the narrative centers the reader on Wolverine immediately. The first page features him entirely alone, establishing his internal monologue and emotional perspective before any other characters appear. This structural choice firmly establishes him as the viewpoint character, whereas Hercules enters later solely as an external disruption to Wolverine’s status quo.

This focus is reinforced by the title billing. The opening caption, "Wolverine vs. Hercules," places the mutant’s name in the primary position. In narrative convention, the first-named character is generally the protagonist, while the second-named functions as the opposing force. Comic Book Resources writer and historian Brian Cronin notes that the use of "vs." provides a "solid argument" for the issue's status as a solo story because it implies a conflict-driven narrative centered on the first-billed character.

Finally, the editorial intent at the time of publication is further clarified by the story's closing promotional tag. The final panel urges readers to "Don't miss Wolverine in each month's Rampage!", omitting Hercules entirely. This marketing choice confirms that the narrative was designed and promoted specifically as a vehicle for the mutant character.

Cronin ultimately concluded that despite Hercules’ presence, "it really does appear that this was a Wolverine-centric story."

This assessment is directly supported by creator intent. In a retrospective interview, writer Jo Duffy confirmed that she purposefully designed the script to function as a solo vehicle, stating she chose the character because she felt "there was a bunch of interesting things that could be done with Wolverine, who had never appeared in a solo story before." She further clarified that Hercules was not intended as a co-star mandated by editorial, but was entirely her own addition because she viewed the demigod as an "entertaining blowhard" who would make an ideal foil and antagonist for Wolverine's solo debut.

Marvel has subsequently corroborated this status in modern collections. The story was included in The Uncanny X-Men Omnibus Vol. 2 (2022) via the inclusion of Marvel Treasury Edition #26. In the official solicitations for the omnibus, the publisher explicitly billed the story as "Wolverine’s first solo story".

=== Historical importance ===
Market analysts have highlighted this story as a critical piece of evidence in tracing Wolverine's character evolution. A 2024 analysis by GoCollect notes that few pop-culture icons have risen from such minor beginnings, transitioning from a supporting role to a franchise lead. The analysis underscores the rarity of early key issues for the character compared to peers like Spider-Man, stating:

For a popular character like Wolverine whose first appearance is in another character's series and had only appeared as a complementary character in a team-up book (the X-Men) through the end of the 1970s, the first comic book where he is the primary focus of the story is significant for Wolverine fans. And Wolverine doesn't have that many key issues in comparison to other popular characters like Spider-Man.

Alex Grand further highlights the story’s layered significance within Marvel’s creative history and Wolverine’s development. He notes that the issue represents several creative firsts and important developmental milestones for the character:

The story is important because it is Wolverine’s earliest solo spotlight, the first time a female writer scripted him, and the first Marvel inking job by George Pérez, all wrapped in a rare, disposable British weekly. I love the artwork, story, and the fun classic Marvel mashup of two misunderstood heroes, Hercules and Wolverine. More importantly, this unique story helps set the tone for the behind-the-mask persona of Wolverine.

Grand’s analysis positions "At the Sign of the Lion" as both a creative inflection point in Wolverine’s characterization and an important artifact of Marvel’s late-1970s experimentation with presenting the character outside of team-based storytelling.

The story is also credited with establishing one of the character's most enduring tropes: the barroom brawl. According to Comic Book Resources (CBR), Wolverine's first decade of publication lacked this element because he was confined to a team book with limited space for solo downtime. "At the Sign of the Lion" marked the first opportunity for a writer to place the character in a solo setting, immediately establishing the "brooding loner in a bar" archetype. This motif would eventually become a defining visual shorthand for the character, heavily utilized in the 20th Century Fox film franchise and the Insomniac Games video game title Marvel's Wolverine.

=== Artistic legacy ===
The story is notable for being the first time that artist George Pérez provided inks for a story at Marvel. Pérez, who was already an established star in the industry at the time, volunteered to ink the audition piece as a personal favor to Duffy due to their friendship. He is credited as the inker over Ken Landgraf's pencils for this issue, making it a unique entry in his bibliography.

Additionally, the issue is cited by historians as the first time a Wolverine story was scripted by a female writer, Jo Duffy.

For penciller Ken Landgraf, the story has become a defined point of pride in his extensive career. In interviews regarding his work, Landgraf has emphasized his desire to be recognized as the artist who drew Wolverine's first solo story, viewing it as a major contribution to the character's legacy.

=== Rediscovery ===
Despite its historical precedence, the story remained largely unknown to the wider international collecting community for decades. This obscurity was due to its release in a disposable, black-and-white British weekly format that was rarely distributed to the United States or cataloged by American historians.

The issue's significance was brought to the forefront in a 2024 feature by the Toronto Star, which detailed the efforts to locate and authenticate the book. The publication timeline was corroborated by reporter and comic historian Brian Cronin. To definitively verify the story's provenance, contact was made with the artist, Ken Landgraf, who confirmed that he had drawn the pages as an assignment in the late 1970s, validating the story's status as original material rather than a reprint.

=== Collectibility ===
Due to its status as a UK-exclusive release and its historical importance, Marvel Comic #335 has become a sought-after collector's item. The Toronto Star noted the extreme difficulty collectors face in locating surviving copies of the newsprint weekly.

Major comic book pricing and cataloging databases—including CovrPrice, Key Collector Comics, GoCollect, PriceCharting, ComicsPriceGuide, MyComicShop, ComicBookRealm, and League of Comic Geeks—formally catalog the issue as a key book, classifying it as "Wolverine's First Solo Story" or as an early solo appearance that predates his American debut.
