= George Pérez =

American comic book artist and writer (1954–2022)

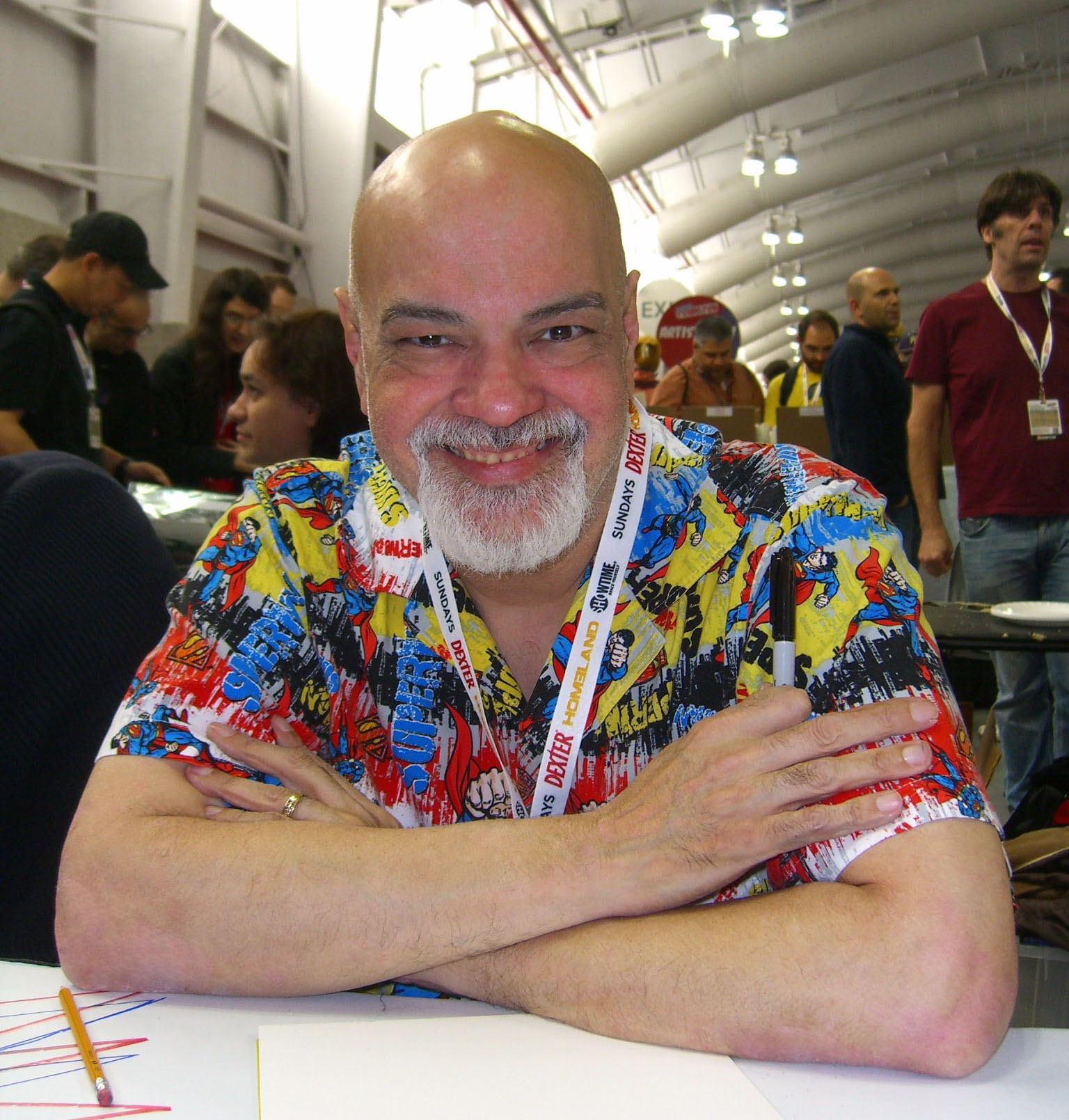
- Pérez at the 2012 New York Comic Con
- Born: June 9, 1954 New York City, U.S.
- Died: May 6, 2022 (aged 67) Sanford, Florida, U.S.
- Areas: Writer, Penciller, Inker
- Notable works: Justice League; The Avengers; Crisis on Infinite Earths; The New Teen Titans; Superman (vol. 3); Wonder Woman (vol. 2); The Flash
- Awards: Eagle Award (1979, 1980, 1986, 2000); Inkpot Award (1983); Jack Kirby Award (1985, 1986); Inkwell Awards SASRA (2022)
- Spouse: Carol Flynn

George Pérez (/ˈpɛrɛz/; June 9, 1954 – May 6, 2022) was an American comic book artist and writer, who worked primarily as a penciller. He came to prominence in the 1970s penciling Fantastic Four and The Avengers for Marvel Comics. In the 1980s, he penciled The New Teen Titans, which became one of DC Comics' top-selling series. He penciled DC's landmark limited series Crisis on Infinite Earths, followed by relaunching Wonder Woman as both writer and penciller. In the meantime, he worked on other comics published by Marvel, DC, and other companies into the 2010s. He was known for his detailed and realistic rendering, and his facility with complex crowd scenes.

Among the many characters Pérez created or co-created are Cyborg, Raven, Starfire, Deathstroke, White Tiger, and the Nightwing identity of Dick Grayson.

== Early life ==
George Pérez was born on June 9, 1954, in the South Bronx, New York City, to Jorge Guzman Pérez and Luz Maria Izquierdo, who were both from Caguas, Puerto Rico, but met after settling in New Jersey while searching for job opportunities. They married in October 1954 and subsequently moved to New York, where Jorge worked in the meat packing industry while Luz was a homemaker. George's younger brother David was born in May 1955. Both brothers aspired at a young age to be artists, with George beginning to draw at the age of five.

== Career ==
=== Early career ===
Pérez's first involvement with the professional comics industry was as artist Rich Buckler's assistant in 1973, and he made his professional debut in Marvel Comics' Astonishing Tales #25 (Aug. 1974) as penciler of an untitled two-page satire of Buckler's character Deathlok, star of that comic's main feature. Soon Pérez became a Marvel regular, penciling a run of "Sons of the Tiger", a serialized action-adventure strip published in Marvel's long-running Deadly Hands of Kung Fu magazine and authored by Bill Mantlo. He and Mantlo co-created the White Tiger (comics' first Puerto Rican superhero), a character that soon appeared in Marvel's color comics, most notably the Spider-Man titles.

Pérez came to prominence with Marvel's superhero-team comic The Avengers, starting with issue #141. In the 1970s, Pérez illustrated several other Marvel titles, including Creatures on the Loose, featuring the Man-Wolf; The Inhumans; and Fantastic Four. Writer Roy Thomas and Pérez crafted a metafictional story for Fantastic Four #176 (Nov. 1976) in which the Impossible Man visited the offices of Marvel Comics and met numerous comics creators. While most of Pérez' Fantastic Four issues were written by Roy Thomas or Len Wein, it would be a Fantastic Four Annual where he would have his first major collaboration with writer Marv Wolfman. Pérez drew the first part of writer Jim Shooter's "The Korvac Saga", which featured nearly every Avenger who had joined the team up to that point. Shooter and Pérez introduced the character of Henry Peter Gyrich, the Avengers' liaison to the United States National Security Council in the second chapter of that same storyline. Writer David Michelinie and Pérez created the Taskmaster in The Avengers #195 (May 1980).

Around this period, Pérez also contributed work for Marvel UK, most notably on the Wolverine story "At the Sign of the Lion". The story was written in 1978 by Jo Duffy and penciled by Ken Landgraf, with Pérez providing the inks—his first credited inking work for Marvel. The completed story was published the following year in Marvel Comic #335 (March 1979).

=== The New Teen Titans ===
The New Teen Titans #1 (Nov. 1980, inked by Dick Giordano) and Crisis on Infinite Earths #1 (April 1985), two of the essential Pérez works for DC Comics in the 1980s

In 1980, while still drawing The Avengers for Marvel, Pérez began working for their rival DC Comics. Offered the art chores for the launch of The New Teen Titans, written by Wolfman, Pérez's real incentive was the opportunity to draw Justice League of America (an ambition of Pérez's that "seemed like a natural progress from the Avengers"). Long-time Justice League artist Dick Dillin died right around that time, providing an opportunity for Pérez to step in as regular artist. While Pérez's stint on the JLA was popular with fans, he received greater attention for his work on The New Teen Titans, which was launched in a special preview in DC Comics Presents #26 (October 1980). This incarnation of the Titans was intended to be DC's answer to Marvel's increasingly popular X-Men comic, and it became highly successful. A New Teen Titans drug awareness comic book sponsored by the Keebler Company and drawn by Pérez was published in cooperation with The President's Drug Awareness Campaign in 1983. In August 1984, a second series of The New Teen Titans was launched by Wolfman and Pérez. Moreover, Pérez's facility with layouts, details, and faces improved enormously during his four years on the book, making him one of the most popular artists in comics as evidenced by the numerous industry awards he would receive during this time. (See Awards section below.)

=== Crisis on Infinite Earths ===
Pérez took a leave of absence from The New Teen Titans in 1984 to focus on his next project with Marv Wolfman, DC's 1985 50th-anniversary event, Crisis on Infinite Earths. Crisis purportedly featured every single character DC owned, in a story which radically restructured the DC universe's continuity. Pérez was inked on the series by Dick Giordano, Mike DeCarlo, and Jerry Ordway. After Crisis, Pérez inked the final issue of Superman (issue #423) in September 1986, over Curt Swan's pencils, for part one of the two-part story "Whatever Happened to the Man of Tomorrow?" by writer Alan Moore. The following month, Pérez was one of the artists on Batman #400 (October 1986). Wolfman and Pérez teamed again to produce the History of the DC Universe limited series to summarize the revised history of their fictional universe. Pérez drew the cover for the DC Heroes roleplaying game (1985) from Mayfair Games as well as the cover for the fourth edition of the Champions roleplaying game (1989) from Hero Games.

=== Wonder Woman ===
Cover of Wonder Woman vol. 2 #1 (February 1987)

Pérez played a key role in the 1987 reboot of the Wonder Woman franchise. Writer Greg Potter spent several months working with editor Janice Race on new concepts for the character, before being joined by Pérez. Inspired by John Byrne and Frank Miller's work on refashioning Superman and Batman, Pérez came in as the plotter and penciler of the series, which tied the character more closely to the Greek gods and jettisoned many other elements of her history. Pérez at first worked with Potter and Len Wein on the stories, but eventually took over the full scripting chores. Later, Mindy Newell joined Pérez as co-writer for nearly a year. While not as popular as either Titans or Crisis, the series was a very successful relaunch of one of DC's flagship characters. Pérez would work on the title for five years, leaving as artist after issue #24, but remaining as writer up to issue #62, leaving in 1992. Pérez returned to the character in 2001, co-writing a two-part story in issues #168–169 with writer/artist Phil Jimenez. Pérez also drew the cover for Wonder Woman #600 (Aug. 2010) as well as some interior art. For the successful 2017 Wonder Woman feature film, director Patty Jenkins would credit Pérez's work on the title character as a major influence, on par with the work of the original creator, William Moulton Marston.

=== The New Titans ===
Pérez returned as co-plotter/penciller of The New Teen Titans with issue #50 (Dec. 1988), with the series being renamed The New Titans, rewriting the origin of Wonder Girl, following the retcons in Crisis on Infinite Earths. Pérez remained as penciller with the book through to issue #55, 57, and 60, while only providing layouts for issues 58–59, and 61, with artist Tom Grummett finishing pencils and Bob McLeod as inker. The storyline "A Lonely Place of Dying" crossed over with the Batman series and introduced Tim Drake as the new Robin. Pérez remained as inker for the cover art to issues #62–67 and co-plotted the stories for #66–67 before departing from the Titans series once again.

=== Superman ===
Pérez was involved with Superman in various times over his career, including his tenure on Justice League of America years before. In Action Comics #544 (June 1983), he designed Lex Luthor's trademark battlesuit. These new designs for the villain were featured as part of the licensed action figure toyline the Super Powers Collection and remain in use in today's DC Comics continuity. Pérez pencilled DC Comics Presents #61 (Sept. 1983) which featured a Superman/OMAC team-up. A few years later, Pérez inked John Byrne's pencils for the Superman/Wonder Woman story in Action Comics #600 (March 1988). He drew portions of Action Comics Annual #2 (1989) before taking over the title with issue #643 (July 1989). His work duties on Action Comics would change from writer/penciller, to co-writer/breakdowns, to providing breakdowns, with writer Roger Stern scripting stories and artists Brett Breeding and Kerry Gammill provided finishing art, while Pérez drew all covers during his run on the title, with the exception for issue #646 with interior pencils by Keith Giffen. With writer Stern, he co-created the character Maxima who first appeared in Action Comics #645 (September 1989). In the double-size anniversary issue #650 in February 1990, Pérez penciled and inked an eight page flashback story depicting Superman's first post-Crisis encounter with the Justice League of America. Pérez briefly wrote Adventures of Superman, providing plots for issues #457–59 (Aug. 1989 – Oct. 1989), and inks for issue #461 (Dec. 1989). Due to an already heavy workload while doing both Wonder Woman and Superman at the same time, he left Action Comics with issue #652 (April 1990).

=== War of the Gods / Infinity Gauntlet ===
It was during this run in 1991 that Pérez encountered problems working with DC. Pérez has stated that since the storyline's inception, which ran through the Wonder Woman comic and crossed over into others, he had trouble writing the War of the Gods storyline, mostly due to editorial problems. Pérez felt that DC was not doing enough to celebrate Wonder Woman's 50-year anniversary. To make matters worse in his eyes, DC did not place War of the Gods in newsstand distribution, which meant that the comic book could only be found in comics specialty shops. Pérez had built up a plot to marry the characters Steve Trevor and Etta Candy in his final issue. When he discovered that DC editors had decided to not only pass the Wonder Woman title's writing to William Messner-Loebs and have Messner-Loebs write the final wedding scene, Pérez quit the title and separated himself from DC for several years. In 1992, he was guest inker on Deathstroke the Terminator issues #10–11.

Also in 1991, Pérez signed on to pencil the six-issue limited series Infinity Gauntlet for Marvel Comics, which was written by Jim Starlin. However, due to the turbulence happening concurrently with War of the Gods, this was a very stressful personal period for Pérez, and he was not able to finish penciling the entire run of Infinity Gauntlet, leaving the project part way through issue #4. The Infinity Gauntlet editorial team decided to find a replacement artist to finish the miniseries, and Ron Lim was the artist chosen (although Pérez offered to remain on as the inker over Lim's cover art for the remainder of the miniseries).

Because of the debacles over War of the Gods and The Infinity Gauntlet, Pérez began to gain a reputation as a creator who could not finish projects as planned. Furthering that impression, he worked with independent comic book publishers Malibu Comics, drawing Break-Thru and Ultraforce (both titles were part of Malibu's Ultraverse imprint), and then working at Tekno Comix drawing I-Bots. However, despite being paid well by both publishers, he had no enthusiasm drawing the characters, and lost interest in drawing the titles.

=== 1990s and return to The Avengers ===
Cover of Hulk: Future Imperfect #1 (December 1992)

Cover to Teen Titans vol. 2, #5, featuring the 1996–98 team. Art by Dan Jurgens and Pérez

In the 1990s, Pérez left the spotlight, although he worked on several projects, including working on the Jurassic Park comic book adaptation of the movie for Topps Comics in 1993, adapted by Walt Simonson and pencilled by Gil Kane, with Pérez as inker, but most notably at Marvel Comics with Sachs and Violens and Hulk: Future Imperfect, both written by Peter David. David has named Pérez his favorite artistic collaborator, and one of the three artists whose art has mostly closely matched the visuals he conceived when writing a comic book script (the others being Leonard Kirk and Dale Keown).

Pérez returned to DC Comics in October 1996 for another incarnation of the Teen Titans. Teen Titans vol. 2 was written and penciled by Dan Jurgens, with Pérez as inker for the first 15 issues of its twenty four-issue run. The series ended in September 1998.

Pérez had a stint as writer of Silver Surfer vol. 2 #111–123 (December 1995 – December 1996). He would also write the crossover special Silver Surfer/Superman in 1996. Pérez finally returned to a major ongoing title for the third series of The Avengers, written by Kurt Busiek, where he remained for nearly three years, again receiving critical and fan acclaim for his polished and dynamic art. After leaving the series, he and Busiek produced the long-awaited JLA/Avengers inter-company crossover, which saw print in late 2003. A JLA/Avengers crossover was to have been published in the 1980s, but differences between DC and Marvel forced the comic to be canceled. As the artist on the story, Pérez had drawn approximately 21 pages of the original crossover, which were not published until the 2004 hardcover edition of JLA/Avengers: The Collector's Edition.

=== Gorilla Comics and CrossGen ===
In 1997, Pérez began writing and illustrating Crimson Plague, a creator-owned science fiction story about an alien with ultra-toxic blood, with the first issue published by Event Comics. In June 2000, that issue was re-published by Gorilla Comics – a publishing imprint he co-owned with several other creators – with additional material and pages, with a follow-up issue published in September. Pérez cited the debt he had acquired self-publishing as the reason for discontinuing the series. Artwork from the unpublished third issue was included in George Pérez Storyteller.

Pérez worked for new publisher CrossGen early in the 2000s, penciling four issues of CrossGen Chronicles. His main project for the company was penciling Solus, which was intended to be an ongoing series, but was cancelled after eight issues due to CrossGen's bankruptcy.

=== Return to DC ===
In May 2006, Pérez illustrated the cover art to one of the alternative covers to the direct market release of the annual Official Overstreet Comic Book Price Guide (36th edition) featuring Wonder Woman. He was guest artist for an issue of JSA #82 (April 2006) and was cover artist from issues #82–87. He drew the first ten issues of DC's The Brave and the Bold (vol. 2) in 2007 with writer Mark Waid. Pérez worked on Infinite Crisis, a follow-up to Crisis on Infinite Earths, as a fill-in artist. He worked on Final Crisis: Legion of 3 Worlds in 2008–2009, thus contributing to every chapter of DC's Crisis trilogy. He worked with Marv Wolfman on a direct-to-DVD movie adaptation of the "Judas Contract" story arc from Teen Titans, scheduled for 2017.

He was co-chair of the board of the comic industry charity The Hero Initiative and served on its Disbursement Committee. In 2005, an animated version of Pérez made a cameo appearance in the Teen Titans episode titled "Go", which was an adaptation of his The New Teen Titans #1. In City of Heroes, an MMORPG about superheroes, a zone (Pérez Park) is named after him.

=== 2010s ===
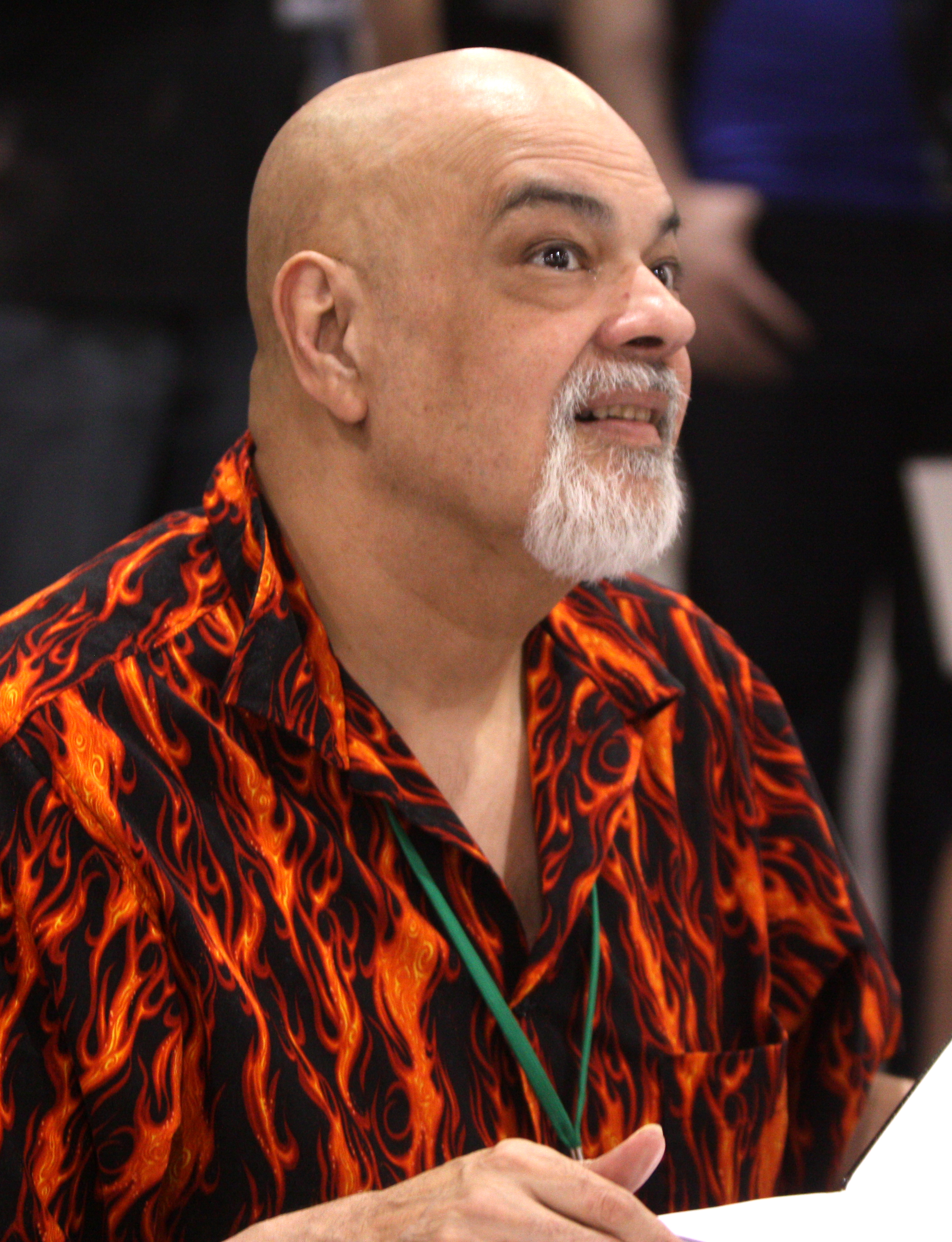
Pérez at the 2012 Phoenix Comicon in Phoenix, Arizona

In September 2011, DC launched a new Superman series written by Pérez, who also provided breakdowns and cover art, with interior art by Jesús Merino and Nicola Scott. Pérez remained until issue #6. The New Teen Titans: Games hardcover graphic novel was published the same month reuniting the creative team of Wolfman and Pérez. He was the inker of the new Green Arrow series, also launched in the same timeframe, over artist Dan Jurgens' pencils, reuniting the mid-1990s Teen Titans art team. Pérez and Kevin Maguire were alternating artists on a Worlds' Finest revival written by Paul Levitz.

In July 2012, Pérez explained his departure from Superman as a reaction to the level of editorial oversight he experienced. This included inconsistent reasons given for rewrites of his material, the inability of editors to explain to him basic aspects of the New 52 Superman's status quo (such as whether his adoptive parents were still alive), and restrictions imposed by having to be consistent with Action Comics, which was set five years earlier than Superman, a situation complicated by Action writer Grant Morrison having not been forthcoming about their plans.

From September 2014 to December 2016, Pérez wrote and drew six issues of his own creation Sirens, published by BOOM! Studios. It is a science fiction miniseries dedicated to a group of women with extraordinary powers, who fight against evil across time and space.

In January 2019, Pérez announced that he was formally retiring due to various health issues, and would continue to produce only a limited number of convention-style head sketches on commission, and attend a limited number of conventions.

== Personal life and death ==
Pérez was married to Carol Flynn. He had no children. He had a brother David, and a niece and nephew.

In October 2013, Pérez revealed that he would soon undergo laser and injection surgeries to address hemorrhaging in his left eye that had effectively made him blind in that eye. By the following June, the procedures were not yet completed, but his condition had improved to the point that he was able to resume his work. In May 2017, he was admitted to a hospital with chest pains due to a heart attack while traveling to a convention, and had a coronary stent fitted. By January 2019, Perez was dealing with multiple health issues, including diabetes and problems with his vision and his heart.

In December 2021, he revealed that after undergoing surgery for a blockage in his liver, he had been diagnosed with inoperable pancreatic cancer. Given a prognosis of 6 to 12 months, he chose not to pursue treatment. In early 2022, both DC and Marvel included tributes to him and his work in their comics, and jointly approved a limited-run reprint of the 2003 JLA/Avengers story he illustrated (long tied up by disagreements between the rival publishers), as a benefit for The Hero Initiative.

Pérez died at his home on May 6, 2022, due to complications from pancreatic cancer. An open memorial service was held at MegaCon Orlando on May 22.

The 2024 film Justice League: Crisis on Infinite Earths was dedicated in the memories of him and Batman voice actor Kevin Conroy. The 2023 video game Justice League: Cosmic Chaos was also dedicated to his memory along with Gilbert Gottfried, Tim Sale, Alan Grant, Neal Adams, and Kevin Conroy, all of whom also died in the same year.

== Awards ==
Pérez won a 1979 Eagle Award (with Jim Shooter, Sal Buscema, and David Wenzel) for Best Continued Story for his work on The Avengers #167–168 and 170–177. In 1980 he won the Eagle Award for Best Comicbook Cover for Avengers #185. He won the Eagle Award for Favourite Artist (penciller) in 1986. Pérez received an Inkpot Award in 1983.

In 1985, DC Comics named Pérez as one of the honorees in the company's 50th anniversary publication Fifty Who Made DC Great.

His work (with Marv Wolfman and Romeo Tanghal), earned The New Teen Titans #50 a nomination for the 1985 Jack Kirby Award for Best Single Issue. His collaboration with Wolfman earned Crisis on Infinite Earths the Jack Kirby Award for Best Finite Series in both 1985 and 1986.

Pérez has won several Comics Buyer's Guide Fan Awards. He won the "Favorite Artist" award in 1983 and 1985 and "Favorite Penciler" in 1987. In addition, he won the "Favorite Cover Artist" award three consecutive years 1985–1987. Crisis on Infinite Earths won the award for "Favorite Limited Series" in 1985.

Pérez worked on several stories which won the CBG award for "Favorite Comic-Book Story":

- 1984 "The Judas Contract" in Tales of the Teen Titans #42–44 and Annual #3
- 1985 "Beyond the Silent Night" in Crisis on Infinite Earths #7
- 1989 "A Lonely Place of Dying" in Batman #440–442 and The New Titans #60–61

In 2022, Pérez was awarded the Inkwell Awards Stacey Aragon Special Recognition Award (SASRA) for his lifetime achievement in inking.

== Bibliography ==
=== Interiors ===
Pencil art in all cases, except where noted:

==== BOOM! Studios ====
- Sirens miniseries, #1–6 (2014–2016)

CFD Productions

• Forever Warriors #1 (cover art with Rich Buckler)

==== DC Comics ====
- 52 #25 (Nightwing backup story) (2006)
- Action Comics #643–645 (full pencils); #600 (inks over John Byrne); #647–649, 651–652 (layouts only, Kerry Gammill pencils); #650 (8 pages, pencil & inks; among other artists) (1989–1990)
- Action Comics Annual #2 (inks over Mike Mignola, among other artists) (1989)
- Adventures of Superman #457-459 (plots with Dan Jurgens), 461 (inks over Dan Jurgens) (1989)
- All-Star Squadron Annual #3 (among other artists) (1984)
- Batman #400 (among other artists); #440, 442 (plotter) (1986–1989)
- The Brave and the Bold vol. 2 #1–10 (2007–2008)
- Crisis on Infinite Earths #1–12 (1985–1986)
- DC Comics Presents #26 (New Teen Titans preview story), #61 (Superman/OMAC) (1980, 1983)
- DC Special: The Return of Donna Troy #1–4 (inks over Jose Luis Garcia-Lopez) (2005)
- DC Universe #0 (among other artists) (2008)
- DC Universe: Legacies #5 (full art); #6 (inks over Jerry Ordway) (2010)
- Deathstroke the Terminator #10–11 (inks over Art Nichols) (1992)
- The Flash (Firestorm backup stories) #289–293 (1980–1981)
- Flashpoint: Secret Seven, miniseries, #1 (pages 1-15) (2011)
- Green Arrow vol. 5 #1–4 (inks over Dan Jurgens) (2011)
- Heroes Against Hunger (among other artists) (1986)
- Final Crisis: Legion of 3 Worlds, miniseries, #1–5 (2008–2009)
- History of the DC Universe #1–2 (1987)
- Infinite Crisis, miniseries, #3–4, 6–7 (among other artists; 2006)
- Justice League of America #184–186, 192–197, 200 (1980–1982)
- Justice League of America vol. 2 #0 (among other artists; 2006)
- Justice Society of America vol. 2 #82 (2006)
- Justice Society of America vol. 3 #50 (among other artists) (2011)
- New Teen Titans (title then changes to Tales of the Teen Titans) #1–4, 6–34, 37–50; Annual #1–3 (1980–1985)
- New Teen Titans vol. 2 (then New Titans) #1–5 (1984–85); #50–55, 57–61 (1988–1989)
- New Teen Titans: The Drug Awareness (1983)
- New Teen Titans: Games, graphic novel (2011)
- Secret Origins vol. 2 (Robin) (full art), (Space Museum) (inks over Carmine Infantino) #50 (1990)
- Secret Origins Annual #3 (writer/artist/inker, among other artists/cover art) (1989)
- Supergirl vol. 6 #8 (2012)
- Supergirl Annual #1 (inks over Dick Giordano) (1996)
- Superman #423 ("Whatever Happened to the Man of Tomorrow?" story, Part One) (inks over Curt Swan) (1986)
- Superman vol. 3 #1–6 (2011–2012) (writer, layout breakdowns, and cover artist)
- Superman: The Wedding Album (inks) (1996)
- Swordquest miniseries, #1–3 (1982–1984)
- Tales of the New Teen Titans, miniseries, #1–4 (1982)
- The Titans #25 (five pages, among other artists) (2001)
- Teen Titans vol. 2 #1–15 (inks over Dan Jurgens) (1996–1997)
- Teen Titans vol. 3 #50 (among other artists) (2007)
- T.H.U.N.D.E.R. Agents #4 (with Carlos "CAFU" Urbano) (2011)
- War of the Gods, miniseries, #1–4 (1991)
- Wonder Woman vol. 2 #1–24 (writer/pencils), #25–62, 168–169, Annual #2 (writer), Annual #1 (writer/pencils/inks, among other artists), #600 (pencils), #169 (inks over Phil Jimenez) (1987–2010)
- Worlds' Finest #1–7 (with Kevin Maguire), #8–9 (with Carlos "CAFU" Urbano) (2012–2013)
- World's Finest Comics (Teen Titans) #300 (1984)

==== Image Comics ====
- Crimson Plague #1–2 (2000)
- Empire #1 (backup-story, writer/artist) (2000)
- Witchblade #92 (two pages, among other artists) (2005)

==== Marvel Comics ====
- Astonishing Tales (Deathlok) #25 (1974) (Note: Two page humor strip, Pérez' first published work for Marvel)
- The Avengers #141–144, 147–151, 154-155, 160–162, 167-168, 170-171, 194–196, 198–202; Annual #6, 8 (1975–1980); #379-382 (writer for Double Feature flip-book) (1994-1995)
- The Avengers vol. 3 #1–15 (pencils), 18 (inks), 19–25, 27–34 (pencils) (1998–2000)
- Bizarre Adventures (Iceman) #27 (1981)
- Creatures on the Loose (Man-Wolf) #33–37 (1975)
- Deadly Hands of Kung Fu (Sons of the Tiger) #6–14, 16–17, 19–21, 30 (1974–1976)
- Fantastic Four #164–167, 170–172, 176–178, 184–188, 191–192, Annual #14–15 (1975–1980)
- Hulk: Future Imperfect, miniseries, #1–2 (1992–1993)
- Infinity Gauntlet, six-issue miniseries, #1–3 (full pencils); #4 (with Ron Lim) (1991)
- Inhumans #1–4, 8 (1975–1976)
- Logan's Run #1–5 (1977)
- Luke Cage, Power Man #27 (1975)
- Marvel Comic #335 (UK) ("At the Sign of the Lion") (1979)
- Marvel Comics Super Special #4 (1978)
- Marvel Fanfare (Black Widow) #10–13 (1983–1984)
- Marvel Premiere (Man-Wolf) #45–46 (1978–1979)
- Marvel Preview #20 (1980)
- Marvel Treasury Edition #26 (inks over Ken Landgraf) (1980)
- Marvel Two-in-One #56–58, 60, 64–65 (1979–1980)
- Monsters Unleashed (Gullivar Jones) #8 (1974)
- Sachs and Violens, miniseries, #1–4 (1994)
- Sergio Massacres Marvel (inks over Sergio Aragones) (1996)
- Silver Surfer vol. 3 #111–123 (1995–1996) (writer)
- Spectacular Spider-Man Super Special #1 (inks over Darick Robertson) (1995)
- Spider-Man Team-Up #4 (writer) (1996)
- Spider-Man: Hobgoblin Lives #1 (inks over Ron Frenz) (1997)
- Thunderbolts Annual 1997 (three pages, among other artists) (1997)
- Ultraforce/Avengers (1995)
- Unknown Worlds of Science Fiction #2–3 (1975)
- What If (Nova) #15 (1977) (Note: Pérez' first collaboration with Marv Wolfman)
- X-Men Annual #3 (1979)

==== DC Comics and Marvel Comics together ====
- JLA/Avengers, miniseries, #1–4 (2003)

==== Pacific Comics ====
- Alien Worlds #7 (1984) — short story, "Ride the Blue Bus"
- Vanguard Illustrated #6 (1984) — short story, "The Trains Belong to Us"

=== Covers only ===
==== DC Comics ====
- Action Comics #529, 602, 643–652 (1982–1990)
- Adventure Comics #484–486, 490 (1981–1982)
- Amethyst, Princess of Gemworld #5–11 (1983–1984)
- Batman #436–442 (1989)
- Batman and the Outsiders #5 (1983)
- Best of DC Blue Ribbon Digest #17–18, 21–24, 35, 50, 61, 69 (1981–1986)
- Blackest Night: Titans, miniseries, #3 (2009)
- The Brave and the Bold vol. 2 #11-12 (2007–2008)
- Crisis on Infinite Earths HC slipcase (1998; with artist Alex Ross)
- Crisis on Infinite Earths: The Absolute Edition (2005; new dust jacket cover)
- Crisis on Multiple Earths Volume 5 TPB (2010)
- DC Special Blue Ribbon Digest #19 (1982)
- DC Comics Presents #38, 94 (1981–1986)
- The Flash vol. 2 #15–17 (cover artist), Annual #2 (cover art inker only) (1988)
- Flashpoint: Secret Seven #1–3 (cover artist) (2011)
- Green Lantern #132, 141–144 (1980–1981)
- Infinite Crisis #1–7 (variant covers; 2005–2006)
- JSA #82–87 (2006)
- Justice League of America #201–205, 207–209, 212–215, 217–220 (1982–1983)
- Justice Leagues of:
  - JL? (2001)
  - Aliens (2001)
  - Amazons (2001)
  - Arkham (2001)
  - Atlantis (2001)
  - JLA (2001)
- Legion of Super-Heroes #268, 277–281, 300 (1980–1983)
- New Teen Titans #5 (1981)
- New Teen Titans Archives Volume 1 HC (1999)
- New Teen Titans: The Judas Contract TPB (1988 edition)
- New Teen Titans: Who is Donna Troy? TPB (2005)
- Secret Origins Annual #3 (cover art) (1989)
- Superman #364 (1981)
- Teen Titans Spotlight #1, 19 (1986–1988)
- Wonder Woman #283–284 (1981), #300 (b&w illustration on inside front cover) (1983)
- Wonder Woman vol. 2 #25–32, 45–60, 120, Annual #2 (1988–1997)
- Wonder Woman: Gods and Mortals TPB (2004)
- Wonder Woman: Challenge of the Gods TPB (2004)
- Wonder Woman: Beauty and the Beasts TPB (2005)
- Wonder Woman: Destiny Calling TPB (2006)
- World's Finest Comics #271, 276–278 (1981–1982)

==== Marvel Comics ====
- The Avengers #163–166, 172–174, 181, 183–185, 191–192, (1977–1980)
- Captain America #243, 246 (1980)
- Defenders #51, 53, 54, 59, 64 (1977–1978)
- Fantastic Four #183, 194–197 (1977–1978)
- FOOM #19 (1977) – wraparound Defenders cover
- Iron Man #102, 103 (1977)
- Man Called Nova #14 (1977)
- Marvel Holiday Special #1 (1994)
- Marvel Team-Up #65 (1978)
- Marvel Two-in-One #32–33, 42, 50–52, 54, 61–63, 66, 70 (1977–1980)
- Mighty Mouse #4 (1991) (Note: An homage to Crisis on Infinite Earths #7 cover, which had been penciled by Pérez himself)
- Ultraforce/Avengers: Prelude (1995)
- X-51 #5 (1999)
- X-Men #112, 128 (1979)

==== Rebellion ====
- 2000 AD #2100 (2018)

==== DC Comics and Marvel Comics together ====
- Crossover Classics: The Marvel/DC Collection vol. 1 TPB (1991)

== See also ==
- List of Puerto Rican writers
- List of Puerto Ricans
- Puerto Rican literature

== Notes ==
Preceded by George Tuska	The Avengers artist 1975–1978	Succeeded by Sal Buscema
Preceded by Rich Buckler	Fantastic Four artist 1975–1978	Succeeded by Keith Pollard
Preceded by n/a	The New Teen Titans artist 1980–1985	Succeeded by José Luis García-López
Preceded by Trina Robbins and Kurt Busiek	Wonder Woman writer 1987–1992	Succeeded by William Messner-Loebs
Preceded by multiple	Action Comics artist 1989–1990	Succeeded by Bob McLeod
Preceded by Mike Lackey	Silver Surfer vol 2. writer 1995–1996	Succeeded by J. M. DeMatteis
Preceded by n/a	The Avengers vol. 3 artist 1998–2000	Succeeded by John Romita Jr.
Preceded by n/a	The Brave and the Bold vol. 3 artist 2007–2008	Succeeded by Jerry Ordway
Preceded by n/a	Superman vol. 3 writer 2011–2012	Succeeded by Dan Jurgens and Keith Giffen
