= Billy Mure =

American guitarist

- Born: November 4, 1915; New York City, New York, U.S
- Died: September 25, 2013 (aged 97); Vero Beach, Florida, U.S.
- Genres: Hawaiian music; surf; pop; swing; lounge
- Occupation(s): Musician, songwriter
- Instrument: Guitar
- Years active: 1957–2013

Sebastian "Billy" Mure (November 4, 1915 – September 25, 2013) was an American session musician, guitarist, and songwriter who recorded several albums in the 1950s and 1960s in a variety of styles, including surf, Hawaiian, swing, pop, twist, garage rock, pioneered early arena rock and use of power chords, as well as lounge music. He pioneered proto hard rock in the 1950s.

== Biography ==
Mure was born in New York City and played violin at age of nine, before making guitar his primary instrument. He played in bands while in the service during World War II and found work at a radio station WNEW after the war until 1957. In addition to his solo recordings, he worked as a session musician, composer, and arranger. He wrote the popular instrumental "Toy Balloons". In 1959, he released the single "A String of Trumpets", credited to Billy Mure and the Trumpeteers; the song reached #64 on the Billboard Hot 100. Mure had been performing for the past seven years with his band—Top Hats—at Squid Lips in Sebastian, Florida. He died in 2013 at 98

== Discography ==
=== As leader ===
- Super-Sonic Guitars in Hi-Fi (RCA Victor, 1957)
- Fireworks (RCA Victor, 1957)
- Supersonics In Flight (RCA Victor, 1959)
- Supersonic Guitars (MGM Records SE3780 Stereo, 1959)
- Bandstand Record Hop (United Artists Records, 1959)
- A String of Trumpets (Everest Records, 1960)
- Strictly Cha Cha (Everest Records, 1960)
- Around The World In Percussion (Strand Records, 1961)
- Tough Strings (Great Guitar Hits) (Kapp Records, 1961)
- Hawaiian Percussion (Strand Records, 1961)
- Blue Hawaii (Premier Records, 1963)
- Teen Bossa Nova (MGM Records, 1963)
- Hawaiian Moods (Spin-O-Rama Records, 1965)

=== As sideman ===
- Paul Anka — "Diana" (reached #1)
- Frankie Laine — "Rawhide" (reached #6)
- Perry Como — "Don't Let the Stars Get in Your Eyes" (reached #1)
- Ames Brothers — "Ragg Mopp" (reached #1)
- Eddie Fisher — "Oh My Papa" (reached #1)
- Eddie Fisher — "Anytime" (reached #2)
- Don Rondo — "White Silver Sands" (reached #7)
- Marty Robbins — "White Sport Coat and a Pink Carnation" (reached #1)
- Bobby Darin — "Splish Splash" (reached #1)
- Eydie Gorme — "Blame It on the Bossa Nova" (reached #7)
- Rosemary Clooney — "Come on-a My House" (reached #1)
- Danny Davis and The Titans — "Let's Do the Twist for Adults"
- Connie Francis — "Among My Souvenirs" (reached #7)
- Guy Mitchell — "Heartaches by the Number" (reached #1 on C&W listing)
- Perez Prado — "Patricia" (reached #1)
- Tony Bennett — "Because of You" (reached #1)
- Kay Starr — "Wheel of Fortune" (reached #1)
- Tony Bennett — "Cold Cold Heart" (reached #1)
- Brian Hyland — "Itsy Bitsy Teenie Weenie Yellow Polka Dot Bikini" (reached #1)
- Billy Williams — "I'm Gonna Sit Right Down and Write Myself a Letter" (reached #3)
- Johnny Mathis — "Chances Are" (reached #1)
- Patti Page — "How Much is that Doggie in the Window?" (reached #1)
- Marcie Blane — "Bobby's Girl" (reached #2) ** (Produced by Billy Mure)
- Ray Peterson — "Tell Laura I Love Her" (reached #7) **
- Bobby Freeman — "Do You Want to Dance" (reached #7) **
- Johnnie Ray — "Cry" (reached #1) Played as "Sebastian Mure" **
- Della Reese — "And That Reminds Me" (reached #15) **
- Ralph Young - "Moonlight Gambler" with orchestra conducted by Billy Mure (Everest Records 9-19324, 1960)
