= Peter Pan Records =

American Records in New Jersey

- Parent company: SPC (1948–1970); PPI (1970–2006); Inspired Studios (2006–present)
- Founded: 1948
- Distributors: PPI Entertainment Group; Symphonic Distribution
- Genre: Various
- Country of origin: United States
- Location: Boynton Beach, Florida, United States
- Official website: https://peterpan.com

Peter Pan Records is an American record label specializing in children's music. The label was introduced to the public in March 1948. The label was founded by brothers Daniel and Louis Kasen and owned under their company the Synthetic Plastics Company of Newark, New Jersey until the 1970s.

The label became one of the largest and most successful children's specialty record labels in America, manufacturing releases that often contrasted with those of its competitors (Golden Records, Disneyland Records, Wonderland Records, Kid Stuff Records, and Pickwick Records). Peter Pan enjoyed its greatest success as a children's label during the 1950s. Many of their most famous releases were issued on 78-RPM 7- and 10-inch records, and on 45-RPM 7-inch records. Both songs (such as a cover version of "Frosty the Snowman") and stories (such as a heavily abridged version of Peter and the Wolf, with Victor Jory narrating) were released. Releases credited a variety of performers, including Dick Edwards with the Peter Pan Chorus and Orchestra, the Caroleer Singers, the Peter Pan Players and variations on these titles.

The label was notable for its series of book-and-record sets, combining an illustrated storybook (and, later, comic book) with a vinyl record that contained music and narration by "your Peter Pan Storyteller" (who would prompt the listener to turn the page at the sound of a bell or similar sound). Others featured a repertory company of actors performing the stories as audio dramas. Bugs Bunny and the Looney Tunes characters, Popeye the Sailor Man, Huckleberry Hound, The Flintstones, Yogi Bear, Bozo the Clown, the superheroes of DC (Superman, Batman, Wonder Woman, Plastic Man, Green Lantern, Aquaman and Metamorpho) and Marvel (Spider-Man, the Fantastic Four, Hulk and Captain America), Conan the Barbarian, G.I. Joe, Scooby-Doo, Mighty Mouse, Casper the Friendly Ghost, and later Betty Boop, Inspector Gadget, the robots of Robotech, the ThunderCats, and the SilverHawks were among the characters and stories featured in these sets. Peter Pan also produced original stories, most of them based upon TV and film franchises such as The Six Million Dollar Man, Space: 1999, Star Trek: The Original Series, Kojak, and Planet of the Apes. Another original title was The Amazing Adventures of Holo-Man, whose publication did not last beyond its introductionary issue. In the 1970s, many of these properties were released by its subsidiary label Power Records.

One of its most successful releases was Santa Claus is Coming to Town, an original production by Peter Pan's studio collective (known as the Peppermint Kandy Kids), that featured remakes of classic Christmas holiday songs, original songs for the album, and portrayals of Santa Claus and Mrs. Claus.

Also notable was the company's run of Irwin the Disco Duck albums, which featured popular songs of their time (1976 to 1980) and were aimed at children, with the title character acting as a DJ.

Peter Pan Records was spun off into its own entity, Peter Pan Industries. In 1986, the company created Parade Video as a home-video division, as well as Peter Pan Video and Ambassador Video later in the line. In the late 1980s, while keeping its primary asset alive (even though the children's label market had declined), Peter Pan Industries branched into music releases not aimed at the children's market.

The company changed its name to PPI Entertainment of Newark, New Jersey, and established new label divisions and imprints, including Rohit International Records, a budget label from the 1980s and 1990s that specialized in reggae.

In 2006, PPI Entertainment Group changed its name yet again to Inspired Studios, based in West Palm Beach, Florida.

== See also ==
- Book and record
- Cricket Records
- Golden Records
- Kid Stuff Records
- Parachute Records
- Irwin the Disco Duck
- Synthetic Plastics Company
