= Top of the Pops (record series) =

- Genre: Pop music
- Years active: 1968–1985
- Label: Hallmark

Top of the Pops is the name of a series of records issued by Pickwick Records on their Hallmark label, which contain anonymous cover versions of recent and current hit singles. The recordings were intended to replicate the sound of the original hits as closely as possible. The albums were recorded by a studio group comprising session musicians and singers who remained uncredited, although they included Tina Charles and Elton John before they became famous in their own right.

== Creation of the series ==
Record producer Allan Crawford conceived the idea for Top of the Pops, having noted several UK labels such as Music for Pleasure pioneer the anonymous covers format during 1967 and 1968. Crawford's key idea was to create a continuous series of albums with the same title. The Pickwick label agreed to undertake Crawford's idea and the first volume was issued in mid-1968, containing versions of twelve hits including "Young Girl", "Jennifer Eccles", "Do You Know the Way to San Jose" and "I Can't Let Maggie Go". A second volume appeared later in the year and included versions of two Beatles songs.

In 1969 new volumes began appearing at generally regular intervals, with a new LP released every six to eight weeks. Volume numbers were not stated on the record sleeves, each edition simply called Top of the Pops, the name derived from the un-trademarked BBC television show of that name, with which there was no direct connection.

== Background ==
From 1968 to 1985, Hallmark Records released nearly 100 albums consisting of covers of Top 40 hits. According to session singer Tony Rivers, "In those days, more often than not, you had to do three songs in three hours then you were out of there!! Not much chance of getting good at it!" However, he also notes that "there was good and there was bad", and that the studio singers and musicians usually tried their best. Dave Thompson for AllMusic stated that "it becomes apparent that the trick is not to look upon the songs as straightforward attempts to copy the hit song, but as interpretations rendered in the style of the hit". Part soundalikes, part true covers, the series sold well, and two of the albums even reached No. 1 in the UK Albums Chart. In 2002, Hallmark Records went back to the master tapes, re-issuing several of the original albums, and releasing compilations using the recordings, which have a following of their own.

== 1970s ==
During the early 1970s, the Top of the Pops series enjoyed considerable success and buoyant sales. Budget albums were accepted into the main UK album charts for a few months in 1971, during which four Top of the Pops LPs charted, and two made No. 1. However, they were disqualified in early 1972 since their low price was perceived as giving them an unfair advantage in the market.

The albums continued to be released at regular intervals throughout the 1970s, with the general theme and cover art largely unchanged throughout. The cover designs featured female models in period attire, some with the models in skimpy clothing such as miniskirts and bikinis.

There were numerous similar album series in existence in the 1970s, put out by other labels. These include 12 Tops on the Stereo Gold Award record label, Hot Hits on the Music for Pleasure label, 16 Chart Hits on the Contour label, and Parade of Pops on the Windmill label (and, later, the Chevron label), plus several others. Some of these were also commercially successful.

== Offshoot releases ==
In addition to the central series of Top of the Pops, Hallmark issued an annual round-up for each year starting in 1969 and ending in 1981, plus another in 1984 (which was recorded specially, the main series having been wound up by then). Pickwick also assembled tracks from Top of the Pops for several other spin-off album projects, including collections themed by particular artists (such as Top of the Poppers Sing & Play the Beatles' Golden Hits) and a series marketed at children, under the name Top of the Tots.

The main albums also sold well in Europe, and in the early 1970s a short-lived series of special 'Europe Editions' were recorded and released, with different tracks to the contemporary UK albums.

== Reception ==
In a retrospective AllMusic review of The Best of Top of the Pops '81, Dave Thompson felt that "of the three John Lennon songs wrapped up within, either "Imagine" or "Woman" could have given Roxy Music's version of "Jealous Guy" a run for its money in the brokenhearted sincerity stakes".

In his 2022 memoir Good Pop, Bad Pop, Pulp frontman Jarvis Cocker described the series as an example of "bad pop": "Usually, I avoided these records like the plague when I came across them at jumble sales... The original idea behind these albums must have been, 'It's all worthless trash anyway so the kids won't be able to tell the difference.' But of course we could."

== Decline and legacy ==
In the late 1970s the main studio band behind the recordings was dispersed, and both the group's leader Tony Rivers and the regular producer Bruce Baxter left the fold. As a result, from about 1978, Pickwick compiled the LPs from material recorded by external companies. The series ceased in 1982 with volume 91, though a one-off volume (92) was released in 1985.

The end-of-year compilations have been released on CD, as have four of the original 92 sets. Pickwick have also issued a number of themed compilations made up from Top of the Pops recordings, with CDs such as Disco Fever, When They Was Fab, and Knowing Me, Knowing You, an Abba tribute album. In addition, most Top of the Pops albums have been released on iTunes and other music streaming services in several countries, credited to the "Top of the Poppers".
