= Holo-Man =

The Amazing Adventures of Holo-Man #1. Cover art by Joe Giella and Bob Larkin.

Holo-Man is a fictional American superhero who starred in a 1978 single-issue comic book about holography, The Amazing Adventures of Holo-Man, published by Peter Pan Records. Sold with an accompanying 45 rpm read-along record, the comic was one in the company's line of such bundled comic-and-record sets for young children.

== Publication history ==
The Amazing Adventures of Holo-Man was advertised in late 1976 in Marvel Comics. The advertisement copyright reads "1976 ... Worldwide/Wavelength Holographics Inc.", and a mail-order coupon gave the company and address Atomic Comics, P.O. Box 5210, Newark, N.J. 07105". The advertisement offered the comic book; "The Holodisc", described as "a real laser-produced, 3-dimensional pendant" of 1 3/4-inch diameter; and the 45 rpm Holo-Man Action Record, all for $5, with, atypically for such mail-order offers, no additional shipping and handling charge.

Whether the comic of this ad was published in 1977 is uncertain. The Grand Comics Database and comics historian/columnist Scott Shaw reference a 1978 Peter Pan Records release, The Amazing Adventures of Holo-Man #1, alternately numbered PR36. As the GCD explains, "Numbering continues from Wonder Woman: "The Secret of the Magic Tiara" [Book and Record Set] (Peter Pan, 1978 series); numbering continues in Adventures of Robin Hood, The [Book and Record Set] (Peter Pan, 1981 series)."

The 14-page comic's credits list it as "conceived and created by" Vincent A. Fusco and Donald M. Kasen and edited by Barry Van Name, and the feature story, "Birth of a Hero", as written by those three plus Jason V. Fusco, Donald White, Joseph Giella and Audrey Hirschfeld, and illustrated by Giella. The cover art is credited to Giella and Bob Larkin.

The plot ends on an unresolved cliffhanger. It is followed by an uncredited two-page text feature, with Giella illustrations, about holograms; a Giella pin-up page of a super-team, the Holosquad — Laserman, Laserwoman, Wavelength and Utopia — who are all otherwise unseen except for Laserman. A second character who appears on the cover and on the Holosquad page does not appear in the comic's story itself.

== Synopsis ==
Holo-Man is Dr. James Robinson, a leading laser physicist whose work on laser-induced thermonuclear fusion has brought a visit from United States President Jimmy Carter. Just before the first experiment is initiated, Robinson explains to the President that a special apparatus has been erected that would allow them to safely witness the fusion process: by simultaneous activation of two smaller lasers, which are not part of the demonstration, a three-dimensional image of the reaction will be projected onto two mirror plates, displaying the process while not endangering the spectators.

However, the night before, two foreign agents have infiltrated the institute in which the demonstration is conducted and wired the power systems to overload, in the hopes the resulting explosion will kill the President. As Robinson activates the reaction, the laser overloads and explodes. Robinson is destroyed by the blast, shielding the President, but his body's molecular structure is holographically recorded on one of the plates. In addition, a rift is torn through time and space, into a strange dimension where Robinson encounters a strange being called Laserman. Laserman explains to Robinson that the accident has turned the scientist into "the world's first living hologram", with the power to create and control holograms, including his now-converted body. He also presents Robinson with a "holodisc" from a "future time dimension" to recharge his "holo-energy" every 12 hours in order to maintain his powers.

Robinson reawakens in the devastated laboratory, where he finds his assistant, Dr. Hugo Petrovich, dying. Before expiring, Petrovich reveals his assistance in the sabotage because he was coerced by countrymen from his homeland of Surria, who hold his family hostage. He also reveals the reason for this assassination attempt on the President: Surria intends to invade the United States by first launching a fake attack with holographic missiles, upon which an immediate land-bound strike will follow immediately to exploit the confusion caused by the holograms; the President's death was intended to add to the resulting chaos.

By using his new-found powers to warp his body to Washington (in a process relating to lightspeed), Robinson/Holo-Man appears before the President and uses his powers to convince him of the seriousness of the situation. Right after delivering his warning, Holo-Man prepares to use the holodisc to recharge, but then a swarm of holographic missiles darkens the sky over Washington: the Surrian invasion has already commenced.
