= Ken Landgraf =

American comic book creator

- Born: Kenneth Landgraf; November 9, 1950 (age 76) Sheboygan, Wisconsin, U.S.
- Areas: Cartoonist, Writer, Penciller, Inker, Publisher

Ken Landgraf (born November 9, 1950) is an American comic book artist, storyboard illustrator, and commercial artist. He is particularly known for illustrating "At the Sign of the Lion", widely regarded as the first published solo Wolverine story.

== Early life and education ==
Kenneth Landgraf was born in Sheboygan, Wisconsin. He admired the work of comic book artists like Reed Crandall, Russ Heath, Sam Glanzman, Jim Steranko, and Wally Wood, among others. Landgraf described his early interest in comics:

"When I was a kid, I purchased a ditto machine, a Spirit Duplicator, and started printing my own comics like Crimestopper Monthly and Vampire Kiss—sold them through Rocket's Blast, a fanzine. Steve Ditko, the Spider-Man artist, even drew a cover for me. I had two fan letters published in Spider-Man #11 and Adventure Comics. I'd write letters to artists. Ditko and [Joe] Kubert wrote back to encourage me."

Landgraf attended Holy Name Catholic School and later graduated from North Sheboygan High School. As a young man he served in the Navy in Vietnam, and upon returning from the war, joined the Navy Reserve. Landgraf settled in New York as a student attending the School of Visual Arts on the G.I. Bill. At this time he produced his first commercial artwork for various pulp magazines. Determined to become a professional comic book artist, he studied with Will Eisner and Harvey Kurtzman. Landgraf worked as an assistant to comic book artists Howard Nostrand, Gil Kane, and Rich Buckler.

Landgraf took his early samples to DC Comics and Marvel Comics. He said:

"I went up to Marvel around lunchtime and spotted Stan Lee coming out of Marvel’s building. I introduced myself and told him I just got out of the service and asked if I could show him my portfolio. He said he was going to lunch but that I could go up to Marvel and say that Stan said I could show my work to John Romita, the art director. I was able to go in right away to see him."

== Comics ==
Landgraf's artwork appeared in DC Comics publications from 1977 to 1981, including The Witching Hour #85; Ghosts #68, #71–76, #82, #91, and #101; Weird War Tales #89; and The Unexpected #202 and #216. He penciled "Adventures of Nightwing and Flamebird" stories in The Superman Family #184–193 and illustrated Hawkman stories in World's Finest Comics #262, #264–266.

He worked for Marvel Comics as part of Tony DeZuniga’s “Tribe” studio, inking various projects from 1977–1979.

=== Contribution to "At the Sign of the Lion" (1979) ===
Landgraf is widely recognized for illustrating the Wolverine story "At the Sign of the Lion," first published in Marvel Comic #335 (UK) in March 1979. The story—written by Jo Duffy and inked by George Pérez—is regarded by historians, collectors, and multiple pricing authorities as the first solo Wolverine story, predating The Uncanny X-Men #133 (1980) and the 1982 Wolverine limited series.

In a 2019 interview with The Comics Journal, Landgraf stated that illustrating Wolverine’s first solo story is one of the accomplishments for which he most hopes to be remembered, reflecting the personal significance he places on the work.

The story was later reprinted in Marvel Treasury Edition #26 (1980) and has been included in numerous Wolverine and X-Men collections, further cementing its place in the character’s publication history.

=== Additional work ===
Landgraf self-published Rock Comics #1 (1979) through his company Landgraphics Publications. He also created the science fiction series Starfighters, which ran for five issues.

He illustrated comics for heavy metal bands Vikon and Thor Rock Warrior, provided work for Revolutionary Comics' Pink Floyd series, and inked John Jacobs on Dr. Peculiar comics.

He also produced fetish comics under the pseudonym "Dancer" for legendary underground artist Eric Stanton.

== Other work ==
Landgraf created storyboard and onscreen art for television productions including Law & Order, MTV, The Cosby Mysteries, HBO, Showtime, and Lifetime Network, as well as animated series such as The Adventures of the Galaxy Rangers and Avenue Amy. He painted a large mural at the New York Film Academy.

He also produced color illustrations for Harris Publications titles including Tactical Knives, Combat Handguns, and White Tail Deer Hunter.

In the 1980s, Landgraf taught comic book drawing and anatomy at the Parsons School of Design.

Landgraf has been referenced in Can Rock & Roll Save the World?: An Illustrated History of Music and Comics by Ian Shirley; The Weird World of Eerie Publications by Mike Howlett; and Bad Mags by Tom Brinkmann.
