= The Saga of Crystar =

1983 Marvel fantasy comic book

The Saga of Crystar, Crystal Warrior
- Cover to issue #1 of The Saga of Crystar, Crystal Warrior published by Marvel Comics, art by Bob Larkin

Publication information
- Publisher: Marvel Comics
- Schedule: Bi-monthly
- Format: Ongoing series
- Genre: Fantasy
- Publication date: 1983–1985
- No. of issues: 11
- Main character: Crystar

Creative team
- Written by: Jo Duffy
- Artist: Bret Blevins

The Saga of Crystar, Crystal Warrior is an 11-issue fantasy-based comic book published by American company Marvel Comics in 1983. It was associated with a toy line from Remco, consisting of seven figures, some vehicles and accessories.

== Production ==
The toys were first sold in late 1982; the Marvel Comics series was first published in the spring of 1983. Since the toys were released first, many assumed the comic had been a licensed adaptation of the toyline, but Crystar and all of the characters in the toy line and comic book were created and owned by Marvel Comics, which had created the concept with the express intent of selling the license to a toy company. The concept was the work of writers Mark Gruenwald and Ralph Macchio, and artist John Romita Jr.; the series itself was written by Jo Duffy, with artist Bret Blevins drawing the first two issues, before being replaced as regular penciller by Ricardo Villamonte.

Despite the Crystar franchise's obscurity, the title character had a profile featured in the Marvel Comics 1980s Handbook, as well as the Official Handbook of the Marvel Universe A-Z hardcover series. The character also appeared in the variant cover of Marvel Zombies 4 #3, which featured a number of 1980s Marvel Comics characters in a parody of Michael Jackson's "Thriller" video. Crystar and related characters were also the subjects of a parody in the episode "Ban on the Fun" of Robot Chicken, wherein it was suggested that Crystar and his people were made out of crystal meth.

The comic book series was set parallel to the Marvel Universe and featured guest appearances by Doctor Strange, Nightcrawler and Alpha Flight.

== Storyline ==
Years ago, The Demon Lord sent his demon armies to conquer the world of Crystalium. The King of Crystalium led the fight against the Demon Lord in the Chaos War, but he was killed during the war. The forces of Order then sent the wizard Ogeode and the Prisma-Crystal to drive away The Demon Lord's minions and the forces of Chaos. In his defeat, the Demon Lord made the "Prophecy of Chaos", that he would one day send another of his servants to divide the planet against itself and bring ruin to all.

After the end of the Chaos War, the wizards Ogeode and Zardeth visited two princes, the brothers Crystar and Moltar, who had to decide whether their people would ally with Chaos or Order. Crystar chose Order and its champion Ogeode. As Moltar considered Chaos, their uncle Feldspar tried to convince him that Chaos was evil. Moltar, feeling that his uncle had always favored Crystar, became enraged and fought Crystar, injuring Feldspar in the process. Leaving them for dead, Moltar led his followers to the Fountain of Fire to find the wizard Zardeth and ally with Chaos.

Ogeode saves Crystar's life by merging him with the great Prisma-Crystal, rendering the prince's body into crystalline form. Similarly, at the Fountain of Fire, Zardeth magically transforms Moltar and his followers with the power of lava. Moltar and his Magma Men then attempt to conquer the city of Galax. Crystar and his warriors, feeling that flesh and blood would prove ineffective against the transformed armies of Moltar, selected an elite group to be transformed into crystal form like Crystar: Koth, Stalax, and Kalibar.

== Main characters ==
=== Order ===
- Crystar is one of the twin princes of Crystalium and is the leader of the Crystal Warriors for Order.
- Ambara is a former valet to Lavour. During the conflict between the princes, Ambara and Crystar develop a romantic relationship.
- Warbow: A Crystal Warrior, Warbow shot Zardeth in the left eye with an arrow. Losing the eye, but otherwise unfazed by the injury, Zardeth shot out Warbow's left eye in return leaving Warbow mortally wounded. Ogeode used the Prisma-Crystal on Warbow as he did on Crystar to save his life. Warbow secretly has romantic feelings for Ambara.
- Koth is a Crystal Warrior with a ribald sense of humor.
- Stalax is the youngest of the Crystal Warriors.
- Kalibar is a Crystal Warrior.
- Ogeode is a wizard champion of Order. An old man with a bald head and white beard, he is the father of Ika, whom he willingly sacrificed to become a crystal being in an experiment to learn the secrets of the crystal warrior physiology (so that he might learn how to heal one of Crystar's injured followers). Frequently, Ogeode claims to be of diminished mystical ability and of little use to the Crystal warriors thanks to the strain of turning the tide during the great war, yet manages to perform mystical feats during times of crisis.
- Ika is a half-enchantress daughter of Ogeode. Ika was compelled by her father to undergo a transformation to turn her body into crystal so that he could learn the secrets of the Crystal Warrior physiology.

=== Chaos ===
- Zardeth is a wizard leader of Chaos who lost his left eye in an altercation with Warbow.
- Magma Men is a race of lava-skinned warriors.
  - Moltar is one of the twin princes of Crystalium and the leader of the Magma Men for the side of Chaos.
  - Lavour is betrothed to Crystar before the princes went to war. After she thought Crystar was dead, Lavour allied herself with Moltar for the opportunity to become queen of Crystalium.
  - Magma Men Soldiers are the rank and file of Moltar's army.
- Malachite men are a brutal group of barbarian fighters from the Green Hills.
  - Malachon Leader.

=== Other characters ===
- Feldspar is the appointed regent of Crystalium who took a position following the death of his brother, the King of Crystalium. Uncle of Prince Crystar and Prince Moltar, Feldspar has taken authority over the planet until the princes have settled their conflict. He arranged for both Ogeode and Zardeth to alter his body into a partly crystalline and partly molten form to symbolize neutrality in their dispute.

== Action figures ==
In 1982, Remco produced the Crystar action figure line based on the concept for the comic book series. Remco later sold the line to ALN in Europe, as the figures did not sell well in the USA. Crystar and the forces of order were designed to appear to be made of crystal, and Moltar and the forces of Chaos, lava. Seven individually carded figures, four mini playsets (each with an exclusive figure), two dragons (each with an exclusive figure), two catapults and one castle were produced. A variant figure came with the first production run Crystal Dragon, with articulated legs/knees versus the fixed position figure packed with the later releases. The Crystal Castle first production run had alternate colored weapons/accessories with the early production featuring a blue weapon rack, yellow ladder, yellow and green winch; and later production in all grey.

Marvel Comics released an early run comic book before the main series showcasing the upcoming action figures.

=== Vehicles and creatures ===
- Crystal Dragon
- Lava Dragon
- Crystal Shatterpult
- Lava Shatterpult
- Crystal Castle

=== Mini playsets ===
- Crystal warrior catapult set
- Crystal Warrior Battle Set
- The Magic of Crystal
- The Spell of the Evil Wizard

Remco re-used the Shatterpult in their "Lost World of Warlord" action figure line and renamed it the Warpult.

A Marvel Legends figure of Crystar, produced by Hasbro, was unveiled at the 2023 San Diego Comic-Con.

== Legacy ==
During the Secret Wars storyline, some characters from The Saga of Crystar appear in the miniseries Weirdworld as inhabitants of the Battleworld floating island domain of the same name where it is composed of fragments of many alternate reality magical realms including Crystalium. Moltar and his Magma Men are in allegiance with Witch Queen le Fay as they pursue Arkon (who is searching for his kingdom of Polemachus). While in Apelantis, Warbow compels Arkon to assist him in a mission to save his captured prince (later discovered to be Crystar). It is discovered that Crystar has been "shattered". Warbow (seemingly having gone insane) is just happy to have found his lost friend even though Crystar is nothing more than a bag of crystals. Crystar was later resurrected where he helped Arkon, Warbow, Skull the Slayer, the Swamp Queen (a variation of Jennifer Kale), the Man-Things, an army of Elves, an army of Eyemazons, and an army of Man-Wolves in their fight against Witch Queen le Fay and her army of Molten Men and Ogres. Neither side was victorious by the time God Emperor Doom was defeated and Weirdworld manifested in the Bermuda Triangle on the main Marvel Earth.

The cover of issue #8 of The Saga of Crystar, drawn by Michael Golden, featured a skull logo that was used, without Golden's or Marvel's permission, in the Glenn Danzig-fronted bands, Samhain and Danzig.
