= Irwin the Disco Duck =

Anthropomorphic cartoon duck

Irwin the Disco Duck, a.k.a. Irwin the Dynamic Duck, is a fictional character who was featured on a series of children's records from Peter Pan Records. He's depicted as an anthropomorphic white duck with a head of brown hair, usually dressed in 1970s-style clothes (platform shoes, bell-bottoms, et cetera). The character was created by artist George Peed in 1976.

Despite the similarity in both sound and appearance to Donald Duck, Irwin the Disco Duck had no affiliation to the more widely known character of The Walt Disney Company.

== History ==
Inspired by the novelty song "Disco Duck", Peter Pan put out a series of children's records starting in 1976 that were compilations of popular songs of the time. The fictional "host" of the albums was Irwin the Disco Duck, whose name would be altered to Irwin the Dynamic Duck when disco fell out of fashion. None of the songs were by the original artists; according to the album cover, they were being performed by "The Wibble Wobble Singers and Orchestra." Some of the songs featured Irwin singing, but more often he functioned as the album's disc jockey, introducing the songs.

While numerous voice actors played Irwin throughout this series, the most notable is Don Messick of Hanna-Barbera TV cartoon fame, the original voice of Scooby-Doo and other such characters as Papa Smurf, Boo-Boo, Astro (of The Jetsons), Dr. Benton Quest and Bamm-Bamm. His Irwin voice was similar to many Hanna-Barbera and Rankin/Bass characters, including Pixie, Scrappy-Doo and Snip (in Jack Frost).

Irwin's hair, wardrobe and DJ persona are all reflections of American radio personality Rick Dees, who wrote and recorded the "Disco Duck" song on which this series was based.

== Record list ==
Album	Year	Pr. #
Disco Duck Dance Party	1976	8191
Irwin the Disco Duck Dance Party II	1977	8195
Alley Cat and Chicken Fat	1977	8196
Irwin the Disco Duck Christmas & New Years Party	1977	8203
Duck Wars: Big Hits Dance Party	1978	8206
Disco Fever for All Ages	1978	8223
Irwin the Disco Duck in The Navy	1979	8235
Irwin Strikes Back	January 4, 1980	1117
Big Hits Dance Party	December 10, 1980	1112

Note: A two-part comic starring Irwin and his girlfriend Debbi is on the back of two album covers; part one is on the back of "Irwin the Disco Duck Dance Party II," and part two is on the back of "Alley Cat and Chicken Fat."
