= Joe Rosen =

Comic book letterer

- Born: December 25, 1920
- Died: October 12, 2009 (aged 88)
- Areas: Penciller, Letterer
- Notable works: Daredevil; Superman and Spider-Man

Joe Rosen (December 25, 1920 – October 12, 2009) was an American comic book artist, primarily known for his work as a letterer. Over the course of his career with Marvel Comics and DC Comics, Rosen lettered such titles as The Fantastic Four, Captain America, Daredevil, Spider-Man, G.I. Joe: A Real American Hero, The Incredible Hulk, The Further Adventures of Indiana Jones, and X-Factor. He also lettered the DC/Marvel intercompany crossover book Superman and Spider-Man.

== Biography ==
Rosen started his career in the production department of Fawcett Comics, where he worked from 1940 to 1943. He then joined DC Comics' production department, lettering at that publisher until the mid-1950s. By then he had established a prolific freelance career, including with Harvey Comics, where he was known as speedy, professional, and a "quiet fellow." Rosen lettered almost exclusively for Harvey throughout the rest of the 1950s.

In the 1960s and early 1970s, Rosen created pencil artwork for the DC Comics romance title Girls' Love Stories. From 1969 to 1971 he also drew stories for DC's Secret Hearts. In the 1960s, while continuing to letter for DC and Harvey, Rosen also lettered for Marvel Comics, occasionally in 1968–69, and regularly from 1974 onward. Beginning in the 1980s, and throughout the rest of his career, Rosen worked almost exclusively for Marvel.

In 1975 he began lettering Daredevil. Rosen would work on 127 issues of the comic over 16 years.

His brother was Sam Rosen, also a long-time Marvel Comics letterer. Joe Rosen died October 12, 2009.

== Tributes ==
Tom Spurgeon, the Comics Reporter:

Rosen's work managed to combine a certain hushed quality with routine clarity and even, one could say, a muscularity achieved through the crowded precision of the kerning. He enabled Miller's unique voice in a way that was quite unique, and the work would have been slightly but I think perceptibly different without him.

Rick Parker, long-time letterer:

... Those of us who worked in comics at the time all considered Joe Rosen the consummate professional. His work was about as perfect as something can be which was done entirely by hand. ... It seemed to me the man lived to work. When he wasn't lettering he was on the subway to and from the office picking up and delivering work. He had a great humanistic style that never called undo attention to itself or distracted from the storytelling aspect. His "voice" as a letterer was always smooth and he mainlined the dialogue directly into the mind of the reader. He was a man of few words, a modest man who was good at what he did and was highly regarded and respected by all who knew him and his work.
