= Hallmark Records =

British budget record label

Hallmark Records is a British record label.

== History ==
Hallmark Records was founded in the 1960s and was the first budget label in the United Kingdom. The revived company has since become a major publisher of budget CDs in the UK, issuing both public domain and copyrighted material. The company has also re-issued some of its albums from the 1960s and 1970s, such as The Best of Top of the Pops '74. Since copyrights for audio recordings in the UK last 50 years, Hallmark is one of many British record labels which have re-issued Elvis Presley's first album.

Hallmark became a brand of Carlton records/communications and continued to sell CDs under that brand including many tribute albums by Steve Deakin-Davies (Neil Diamond, Tina Turner, Diana Ross and Stevie Wonder) plus numerous "Pan Pipe" versions of hits.

Following the shake up forced by the amalgamation of Carlton TV and its merger with Granada TV to become ITV plc, the Hallmark back catalogue was sold to ABM music.

== See also ==
- Pickwick Records
- Top of the Pops (record series)
