= Marvel Treasury Edition =

American comic book series

Publication information
- Publisher: Marvel Comics
- Format: Ongoing series
- Publication date: 1974 – 1981
- No. of issues: 28

Creative team
- Written by: List: Jo Duffy, Scott Edelman, Steve Gerber, Steven Grant, Mark Gruenwald, Bill Mantlo, Jim Shooter, Roger Stern
- Penciller: List: Brent Anderson, John Buscema, Sal Buscema, Ken Landgraf, Herb Trimpe, George Tuska, Ricardo Villamonte
- Inker: List: Klaus Janson, Bob McLeod, Bruce Patterson, George Pérez, Don Perlin, Joe Sinnott, Ricardo Villamonte
- Editor: List: Stan Lee #1, 3; Roy Thomas #2, 4, 6-7, 15, 19; Len Wein #5; Marv Wolfman #8-9; Gerry Conway #10; Archie Goodwin #11-14, 16; Jim Salicrup #16-17, 20-22, 24-27; Jim Shooter #18, 23, 25, 27; Mark Gruenwald #25; Bob Budiansky #26-27; Al Milgrom #28

Marvel Treasury Edition is an American comic book format published by Marvel Comics, originally published from 1974 to 1981. It usually featured reprints of previously published stories but a few issues contained new material. The series was published in an oversized 10″ x 14″ tabloid (or "treasury") format and was launched with a collection of Spider-Man stories. The series concluded with the second Superman and Spider-Man intercompany crossover. Marvel also published treasuries under the titles Marvel Special Edition and Marvel Treasury Special as well as a number of one-shots.

Marvel revived the format in 2016 with Spidey: All New Treasury Edition. The series continues to this day. This includes the subseries "Black White and Blood", books featuring only the colors black white and red and focus on several iconic Marvel characters such as Spiderman, Wolverine, and Venom.

== Original series ==
| Issue | Date | Title | Notes |
|---|---|---|---|
| 1 | 1974 | "The Spectacular Spider-Man" | Reprints stories from The Amazing Spider-Man #8, 14, 42, and 90 and Marvel Super Heroes #14 and excerpts from The Amazing Spider-Man #72 and The Amazing Spider-Man Annual #1. |
| 2 | December 1974 | "The Fabulous Fantastic Four" | Reprints stories from Fantastic Four #6, 11, and 48–50. |
| 3 | 1974 | "The Mighty Thor" | Reprints stories from Journey into Mystery #125 and Thor #126–130. Collected in The Mighty Thor Omnibus Vol 4 |
| 4 | 1975 | "Conan the Barbarian" | Reprints stories from Conan the Barbarian #11, and the "Red Nails" story from Savage Tales #2–3, now in color provided by Barry Smith, who also added further art/details and re-inking on some pages. |
| 5 | 1975 | "The Hulk on the Rampage!" | Reprints stories from The Incredible Hulk #3; Tales to Astonish #79 and 100; The Incredible Hulk vol. 2 #139 and 141; and Marvel Feature #11. |
| 6 | 1975 | "Doctor Strange" | Reprints stories from Strange Tales #111, 146, 148, and 157; Doctor Strange #170 and 177; and Marvel Premiere #10. |
| 7 | 1975 | "The Mighty Avengers" | Reprints stories from The Avengers #52, 57, 60, and 83. |
| 8 | 1975 | "Giant Superhero Holiday Grab-Bag" | Reprints stories from Nick Fury, Agent of S.H.I.E.L.D. #10; The Amazing Spider-Man #24; Hero for Hire #7; The Incredible Hulk vol. 2 #147; and Doctor Strange #180. |
| 9 | September 1976 | "Giant Superhero Team-Up" | Reprints stories from Sub-Mariner #8; Daredevil #43; Journey into Mystery #112; and Silver Surfer #14. |
| 10 | 1976 | "The Mighty Thor" | Reprints stories from Thor #154–157. |
| 11 | 1976 | "The Fabulous Fantastic Four" | Reprints stories from Fantastic Four #4, 23, 51, and 94. |
| 12 | 1976 | "Howard the Duck" | Howard the Duck meets the Defenders in a new story, "Five Villains in Search of a Plot!", by writer Steve Gerber and artists Sal Buscema and Klaus Janson. Also reprints stories from Fear #19; Giant-Size Man-Thing #4–5; and Howard the Duck #1 with a new opening page. Collected in The Defenders Omnibus Vol 2, Howard the Duck Omnibus |
| 13 | 1976 | "Giant Superhero Holiday Grab-Bag" | New framing sequence by writer Roger Stern and artists George Tuska and Don Perlin. Reprints stories from Marvel Team-Up #6; The Avengers #58; Tales to Astonish #93; and Daredevil #86. Collected in Avengers Omnibus Vol 6, Incredible Hulk Omnibus Vol 4, and Marvel Team-Up Omnibus Vol 2. |
| 14 | 1977 | "The Sensational Spider-Man" | Reprints stories from The Amazing Spider-Man #100–102 and Not Brand Echh #6. |
| 15 | 1977 | "Conan the Barbarian" | Reprints stories from Conan the Barbarian #24; Savage Tales #4; and Savage Sword of Conan #2. |
| 16 | 1978 | "The Defenders" | Reprints stories from Marvel Feature #1 and The Defenders #4, 13–14. |
| 17 | 1978 | "The Incredible Hulk" | Reprints stories from The Incredible Hulk vol. 2 #121, 134, 150, and 158. |
| 18 | 1978 | "The Astonishing Spider-Man" | Reprints stories from Marvel Team-Up #4, 12, 15, and 31. |
| 19 | 1978 | "Conan the Barbarian" | Reprints stories from Savage Sword of Conan #4 and 6. |
| 20 | 1979 | "The Rampaging Hulk" | Reprints stories from The Incredible Hulk vol. 2 #136–137 and #143–144. |
| 21 | 1979 | "Fantastic Four" | Reprints stories from Fantastic Four #120–123. |
| 22 | 1979 | "The Sensational Spider-Man" | Reprints stories from Marvel Team-Up #13 and 19–21. |
| 23 | 1979 | "Conan the Barbarian" | Reprints stories from Savage Sword of Conan #5 and the first storyline from the syndicated Conan newspaper strip. |
| 24 | 1979 | "The Rampaging Hulk" | Reprints stories from The Incredible Hulk vol. 2 #175–178. Also includes a new Hercules story by writer Jo Duffy and artist Ricardo Villamonte. |
| 25 | 1980 | "Spider-Man vs. the Hulk at the Winter Olympics" | New story set at the 1980 Winter Olympics by writers Mark Gruenwald, Steven Grant, and Bill Mantlo with art by Herb Trimpe and Bruce Patterson. Collected in Incredible Hulk Epic Collection Vol 10: To Hunt the Hulk, Amazing Spider-Man Omnibus Vol 7 |
| 26 | 1980 | "The Rampaging Hulk" | Reprints stories from The Incredible Hulk vol. 2 #167–170. Also includes a new Wolverine and Hercules story by writer Jo Duffy and artists Ken Landgraf and George Pérez. Collected in Wolverine Omnibus Vol 1 and The Uncanny X-Men Omnibus Vol 2. |
| 27 | 1980 | "The Sensational Spider-Man" | Reprints stories from Marvel Team-Up #9–11 and 27. Also includes a new Angel story by writer Scott Edelman and artists Brent Anderson and Bob McLeod. The Angel story was originally created to be a backup story in The Champions. Collected in The Uncanny X-Men Omnibus Vol 2. |
| 28 | 1981 | "Superman and Spider-Man" | New story featuring the second Marvel-DC crossover by Jim Shooter, John Buscema, and Joe Sinnott. A sequel to Superman vs. the Amazing Spider-Man. Collected in DC vs. Marvel Omnibus; DC vs Marvel Crossover Classics Vol 1 |

== Marvel Special Edition ==
| Issue | Date | Title | Notes |
|---|---|---|---|
| 1 | June 1975 | "The Spectacular Spider-Man" | Reprints stories from The Amazing Spider-Man #6 and 35 and The Amazing Spider-Man Annual #1. |
| 1 | August 1977 | "Star Wars" | Reprints Star Wars #1–3. Comics adaptation of the George Lucas film by Roy Thomas, Howard Chaykin, and Steve Leialoha. |
| 2 | 1977 | "Star Wars" | Reprints Star Wars #4–6. Comics adaptation by Roy Thomas, Howard Chaykin, and Steve Leialoha. |
| 3 | 1978 | "Star Wars" | Reprints Star Wars #1–6. |
| 3 | 1978 | "Close Encounters of the Third Kind" | Reprints Marvel Comics Super Special #3. Comics adaptation of the Steven Spielberg film by Archie Goodwin, Walt Simonson, and Klaus Janson. |
| 2 | Spring 1980 | "The Empire Strikes Back" | Reprints Star Wars #39–44. Comics adaptation by Archie Goodwin, Al Williamson, and Carlos Garzon. |

== Marvel Treasury Special ==
| Issue | Date | Title | Notes |
|---|---|---|---|
| 1 | 1974 | "Giant Superhero Holiday Grab-Bag" | Reprints stories from Marvel Team-Up #1; Daredevil #7; Amazing Adventures #5; and Fantastic Four #25–26. |
| 1 | 1976 | "Captain America's Bicentennial Battles" | New story by writer/penciler Jack Kirby and inkers Barry Windsor-Smith, Herb Trimpe, John Verpoorten, John Romita Sr., Dan Adkins, and Frank Giacoia. |

== Revival series ==
| Sub-Series | Date | Title | notes |
|---|---|---|---|
| All-New Treasury | | | |
| Grand Design | | | |
| Black White and Blood | | | |

== Other Marvel treasuries ==
- MGM's Marvelous Wizard of Oz (1975): The first joint publishing venture between Marvel and DC Comics. Comics adaptation of the Metro-Goldwyn-Mayer film by Roy Thomas, John Buscema, and Tony DeZuniga.
- Marvel Treasury of Oz (1975): Comics adaptation of The Marvelous Land of Oz by Roy Thomas and Alfredo Alcala.
- Special Collector's Edition #1 (1975): "Savage Fists of Kung Fu" reprints stories from Deadly Hands of Kung Fu #1-2; Deadly Hands of Kung Fu Special #1; and Special Marvel Edition #15.
- Superman vs. The Amazing Spider-Man (January 1976): The first crossover between characters of both companies, written by Gerry Conway and drawn by Ross Andru and Dick Giordano.
- 2001: A Space Odyssey (1976): Comics adaptation of the Stanley Kubrick film by Jack Kirby.
- The Funtastic World of Hanna-Barbera
  - #1 (December 1977) "The Flintstones Christmas Party": New story by writer Mark Evanier and artists Kay Wright and Scott Shaw.
  - #2 (March 1978) "Yogi Bear's Easter Parade"
  - #3 (June 1978) "Laff-A-Lympics"
- Marvel Super Special #8 (1978): Comics adaptation of Battlestar Galactica by Roger McKenzie and Ernie Colón.
- Buck Rogers Giant Movie Edition (1979): Originally published by Western Publishing, second printing published by Marvel.
- G.I. Joe Special Treasury Edition (1982): Treasury format reprint of the first issue of the G.I. Joe: A Real American Hero series.
- Annie Treasury Edition (December 1982): Comics adaptation of the film by Tom DeFalco, Win Mortimer, and Vince Colletta.
- Smurfs Treasury (1983)

== See also ==
- Limited Collectors' Edition - a similar series published by DC Comics
