= Pickwick Records =

US record label; imprint of Pickwick International, Inc

- Type: Private
- Industry: Entertainment (1950-present); Record label (1950-1977)
- Founded: 1950; San Francisco, California, U.S.
- Headquarters: San Francisco, California, U.S.
- Number of locations: United Kingdom; San Francisco, California, U.S.
- Area served: Worldwide

Pickwick Records was an American record label and British record distributor known for its budget album releases of sound-alike recordings, bargain bin reissues, and repackagings under the brands Design, Bravo (later changing its name to International Award), Hurrah, and Grand Prix, and children's records on the Cricket and Happy Time labels.

The label is also known for distributing music by smaller labels such as Sonny Lester's Groove Merchant, Gene Redd's De-Lite Records, Chart Records, and the Swedish label Sonet Records (for which it distributed late-1960s recordings by Bill Haley & His Comets in Canada and the US). They also issued records from Britain's Hallmark Records label.

== History ==
Pickwick logo used in the 1970s

Pickwick Records (originally formed as Pickwick Sales Corporation, later Pickwick International) was founded in 1950 by Cy Leslie, whose first business was a recorded greeting-card service that in 1946 turned into Voco Records, a label of children's records. In 1957, after successfully marketing its Cricket children's label of 78 and 45 rpm records, Pickwick entered the LP market with low-priced records, beginning with its Design label. The albums from the 1960s into the early 1970s bore the "Pickwick/33" imprint.

Singer-songwriter Lou Reed once worked as a staff songwriter for Pickwick Records, and gained experience in its small recording studio. Several of Pickwick's sound-alike albums from 1964 to 1965 feature Reed as an uncredited session musician. Two of his songs, "Cycle Annie" (credited to the Beachnuts) and "You're Driving Me Insane" (as the Roughnecks), both appeared on the Soundsville! compilation in 1965. "The Ostrich" and "Sneaky Pete", two earlier songs by Reed, united him with John Cale, leading to their founding of the Velvet Underground. In 2024, Light In The Attic Records released a compilation of his main contributions on Why Don’t You Smile Now: Lou Reed at Pickwick Records 1964-65.

Amos Heilicher and his brother Daniel Heilicher merged their Musicland retail chain with Pickwick International in the late 1960s. Capitol Records had an early interest in Pickwick, and many Capitol artists, including Frank Sinatra, the Beach Boys, and Nat King Cole, had recordings issued on Pickwick; however, Capitol sold its share in the company in 1970.

In the mid-1970s, Pickwick began reissuing LPs that had been deleted from catalogues of the major record labels, including the RCA Records budget reissue label RCA Camden. Most notably, Pickwick obtained the rights to reissue RCA Camden albums featuring recordings by Elvis Presley. Pickwick reissued an abridged version of Presley's RCA Victor soundtrack album of Frankie and Johnny, a two-record set titled Double Dynamite, a collection of mostly movie songs and Mahalo from Elvis, an album featuring unissued tracks recorded for Presley's Aloha From Hawaii TV special in 1973. After Presley's unexpected death in August 1977, sales of his recordings increased dramatically and RCA reclaimed the rights to Presley's Camden releases from Pickwick.

Pickwick also reissued numerous LPs from the Motown catalogue during the 1970s. On many of these albums, the cover art was changed and/or the track listing was altered (with two or more songs deleted). In the early 1980s, Motown began reissuing its own catalogue albums, thus ending Pickwick's series.

Pickwick launched the subsidiary label P.I.P and began distributing Gene Redd's De-Lite Records, to issue original material. De-Lite hit it big in 1974 and 1975 with million-selling singles and albums by funk band Kool & The Gang. P.I.P had a few big dance-club hits with "7-6-5-4-3-2-1 (Blow Your Whistle)" and "Drive My Car" by Gary Toms Empire in 1975.

In 1977, Pickwick was sold to the American Can Company, which relocated its corporate headquarters from Long Island City, New York, to Minneapolis, Minnesota, then subsequently sold its assets to PolyGram in the same year. PolyGram maintained the De-Lite Records label for releases by Kool and the Gang, who experienced a second wave of success after the addition of new lead singer, J.T. Taylor, beginning with the group's 1979 album, Ladies Night. PolyGram later did away with the De-lite imprint, and subsequent Kool and the Gang records were issued by PolyGram's Mercury label, while De-Lite Records was acquired by Unidisc.

After the purchase by PolyGram, Pickwick again began to issue new material, but this time it was sound-alike albums featuring covers of a certain artist or group on one album, and disco Christmas albums. Most of these albums were performed by session musicians and singers dubbed Mirror Image; Pickwick also issued a few records from groups such as the Young Lovers and Kings Road. This continued until 1983, when PolyGram retired the Pickwick label.

The Hallmark name has since been revived as a budget record label owned by the Pickwick Group.

=== Current ownership ===
Pickwick's catalogue (including the entire De-lite/Mercury catalogue of Kool and the Gang) is now owned by the Universal Music Group, which was formed by the merger of the MCA and PolyGram families of labels in 1999.

== Criticism ==
In the early 1980s, Pickwick manufactured so-called "audiophile" pressings on heavy vinyl (usually 180–240 grams). However, some audio aficionados found the sound quality in these pressings inferior to that of normal vinyl. These LPs were quickly deleted and some record collectors are now willing to pay extremely high prices for these records. In 2003, a copy of The Beach Boys Greatest Hits sold for just over $2,500 at auction, and in 2008, a sealed copy of James Bond—The Themes (which was a purely sound-alike record) sold for $4,000.

Pickwick was well known for its sound-alike records, which often were implied to be the original artists, but actually featured in-house bands or singers. When Pickwick issued The Everly's in 1984, all the songs were, in fact, covered by a singing duo called Twice Divided.

== References in popular culture ==
Pickwick was the record label to which the fictional band Crème Brulée, from British sitcom The League of Gentlemen, was nearly signed to during its 1970s heyday. This came from a running gag about the market-stall sales that Pickwick enjoyed in England.

Thes One, from the hip-hop group People Under the Stairs, mentions the label in the track "43 Labels I Like" (from its 2000 album Question in the Form of an Answer).

== See also ==
- List of record labels
- Drugstore records
