= Jo Duffy =

American comics writer

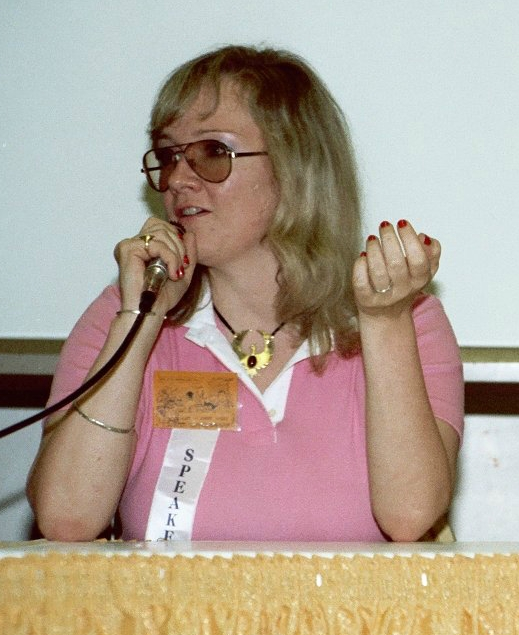
- Comic-Con 1982
- Born: Mary Jo Duffy; February 9, 1954 (age 72) New York City, U.S.
- Areas: Writer, Editor
- Notable works: Power Man & Iron Fist; Star Wars comics Glory "At the Sign of the Lion"
- Awards: Bill Finger Award for Excellence in Comic Book Writing, 2024

Mary Jo Duffy (born February 9, 1954) is an American comic book editor and writer, who worked for Marvel Comics in the 1980s and DC Comics and Image Comics in the 1990s.

== Biography ==
Her writing work for Marvel, which began as an assistant to Archie Goodwin, included Conan the Barbarian, Fallen Angels, Power Man and Iron Fist, Star Wars, Wolverine, and a St. Francis of Assisi biography Francis, Brother of the Universe. Her run on Power Man and Iron Fist was the longest and most successful of the series, and was noted for using a lighthearted, tongue-in-cheek approach at a time when Marvel was pushing darker and more serious stories.

In late 1977, while working as an assistant editor under Archie Goodwin, Jo Duffy wrote an unsolicited audition script featuring Wolverine titled "At the Sign of the Lion", which was accepted by Jim Shooter and published in Marvel Comic #335 (UK) in March 1979. Widely recognized by historians and collectors as the first published solo Wolverine story and the origin of his signature bar-brawl trope, it made Duffy the first female writer, and one of the earliest writers overall, to script Wolverine in a lead role.

In the 1990s, she worked for other publishers, including DC Comics, where she wrote the first 14 issues of Catwoman. For Rob Liefeld's Extreme Studios imprint of Image Comics, she wrote every issue of the first Glory series, between March 1995 and April 1997, the last six of which were released by Liefeld's Maximum Press after his departure from Image. She also worked on the screenplays for the horror films Puppet Master 4 (1993) and Puppet Master 5 (1994) for Full Moon Features.

In the early 2000s, she co-wrote the last issue of Marvel's Defenders vol. 2 and the six issues of the follow-up series The Order with Kurt Busiek, while working at a financial services company in Lower Manhattan. Her work at that company included meeting planning, editing, proofreading, and packaging for a comic book published by the company. From 2003 to 2006, she also wrote the English script adaptations of Naruto for Viz Media.

Since then, she has been largely absent from the publishing scene. She made multiple announcements on her Facebook page that she created a new company to self-publish her work and incorporated Armin Armadillo Publishers in 2008. As of 2013, the company is listed as inactive.

== Awards ==
Jo Duffy received the Bill Finger Award for Excellence in Comic Book Writing in 2024. In 2024, Duffy would be a recipient of the Inkpot Award at the annual San Diego Comic Con.

== Bibliography ==
=== Aria Press ===
- A Distant Soil (backup story) #2, 9 (1992–1994)

=== Beyond ===
- Writer's Block 2003 (2003)

=== Blue Sky Blue (self-published) ===
- Nestrobber #1–2 (1992–1994)

=== Claypool Comics ===
- Elvira: Mistress of the Dark #1–6, 111 (1993, 2002)

=== Dark Horse Comics ===
- Dark Horse Presents #56, 58, 67–69 (1991–1993)

=== DC Comics ===
- 9-11: The World's Finest Comic Book Writers & Artists Tell Stories to Remember, Volume Two (2002)
- Batman #413 (1987)
- Batman Black and White #4 (1996)
- Catwoman #1–14 (1993–1994)
- Detective Comics #582 (1988)

=== Eclipse Comics ===
- Night Music #3 (1985)

=== Harris Comics ===
- Creepy: The Limited Series #1, 3 (1992)

=== Image Comics ===
- Bloodpool #1–4, Special #1 (1995–1996)
- Glory #1–15, #0 (1995–1996)
- Glory/Celestine: Dark Angel #1 (1996)

=== Marvel Comics ===
- Akira #1–37 (English adaptation) (1988–1996)
- The Amazing Spider-Man #278 (with Tom DeFalco and Peter David) (1986)
- Bizarre Adventures #27 (Nightcrawler, Iceman), #28 (Triton) (1981)
- Chuck Norris: Karate Kommandos #1–3 (1987)
- Classic X-Men #18, 20 (backup stories) (1988)
- Conan the Barbarian #146 (1983)
- Daredevil #157 (1979)
- Defenders #69 (1979)
- Defenders vol. 2 #12 (with Kurt Busiek) (2002)
- Doom 2099 #25 (1995)
- Dreadstar #14 (one page cartoon) (1984)
- Epic Illustrated #18–19, 21, 25, 30, 34 (1983–1986)
- Fallen Angels #1–8 (1987)
- Francis, Brother of the Universe #1 (1980)
- Heroes for Hope Starring the X-Men #1 (1985)
- The Incredible Hulk Annual #11 (backup story) (1982)
- Kickers, Inc. #3 (with Tom DeFalco) (1987)
- Marvel Comic (UK) #335 ("At the Sign of the Lion") (1979)
- Marvel Age Annual #1 (among others) (1985)
- Marvel Comics Presents #14, 42, 56, 80 (1989–1991)
- Marvel Fanfare #10–11, 14, 38, 50 (1983–1990)
- Marvel Graphic Novel: The Punisher: Assassin's Guild (1989)
- Marvel Graphic Novel: Willow (1988)
- Marvel Super-Heroes vol. 2 #5–6 (with Steve Ditko) (1991)
- Marvel Team-Up #125 (Doctor Strange and the Scarlet Witch) (1983)
- Marvel Treasury Edition #24 (Hercules backup story) (1980)
- Marvel Two-in-One #49 (The Thing and Doctor Strange) (1979)
- Memories one-shot (English adaptation) (1992)
- Moon Knight vol. 2 #5 (1985)
- The Order #1–6 (with Kurt Busiek) (2002)
- Power Man and Iron Fist #56–75, 77–84 (1978–1982)
- The Punisher vol. 1 #5 (1986)
- The Saga of Crystar, Crystal Warrior #1–11 (1983–1985)
- Savage Sword of Conan #83 (1982)
- Speedball #3, 5–10 (1988–1989)
- Star Wars #24, 70–77, 79–82, 85, 87–88, 90–97, 99–107, Annual #3 (1979, 1983–1986)
- Uncanny X-Men Annual #8 (with Chris Claremont) (1984)
- What If...? #27 (X-Men), #34 (1981–1982)
- Wolverine vol. 2 #25–30 (1990)
- X-Factor Annual #2 (1987)

=== Maximum Press ===
- Glory #17–22 (1996–1997)
- Glory/Celestine: Dark Angel #3 (1996)

=== Viz Media ===
- Naruto #1–10 (English adaptation) (2003–2006)

=== WaRP Graphics ===
- Elfquest #21 (text article) (1985)

== Screenwriting Credits ==
- Puppet Master 4 (1993)
- Puppet Master 5 (1994)

Preceded by Ed Hannigan	Power Man and Iron Fist writer 1979–1982	Succeeded by Dennis O'Neil
Preceded by David Michelinie	Star Wars writer 1983–1986	Succeeded by n/a
Preceded by Archie Goodwin	Wolverine vol. 2 writer 1990	Succeeded by Larry Hama
Preceded by n/a	Catwoman vol. 2 writer 1993–1994	Succeeded by Chuck Dixon
