= Synthetic Plastics Company =

American plastics manufacturer

Peter Pan Industries
- Formerly: Synthetics Plastics Company (until 1964)
- Founder: Daniel Kasen
- Headquarters: Newark, New Jersey
- Subsidiaries: Peter Pan Records (1949-1970)

Synthetics Plastics Company or SPC of Newark, New Jersey was a plastics manufacturing company that made various items made of plastic including children's records and budget music albums.

== Buttons and toy parts ==
SPC was formed by Daniel Kasen in the late 1920s as a plastic manufacturer of buttons for the garments industry and game parts for the toy industry.

== Record labels ==
After World War II, Daniel and his brother Louis Kasen founded Peter Pan Records, in 1949, operating the label under SPC from then until 1970. Daniel and Louis Kasen owned several subsidiary music labels including: Ambassador Records, Guest Star, Parade, Prom, Promenade, Pirouette, Power Records, Spin-O-Rama (1959), and Diplomat Records, whose motto was "Fine records need not be expensive".

In 1950, the American Music Performance Trust Fund challenged Synthetic for not paying royalties. A spokesman said that Peter Pan records were designed purely for home use and therefore there was no reason to pay contributions to the fund.

Diplomat Records had its own children's label, Rocking Horse. In the 1960s SPC ventured into the Southern Gospel music arena when it hired former Oak Ridge Quartet member Ron Page to solicit groups to record for its Scripture label. Most of the Scripture sessions were done in Nashville, Tennessee, with the musicians under the direction of pianist/composer David Reece. Groups recording for Scripture included The Sego Brothers & Naomi, The Rangers Trio (featuring Reece and Page), Wendy Bagwell and the Sunliters, and The Goss Brothers.

Under the SPC banner, one of their most successful records released was "My Son, The President", a comedy spotlighting then-president John F. Kennedy, his wife, Jacqueline Kennedy and their daughter, Caroline, that followed in the footsteps of Vaughn Meader's The First Family series of comedy records. "My Son, The President" (the "My Son" part of the title itself borrows from Allan Sherman's series of comedy albums) was released on the Clan subsidiary of SPC in 1963.

They were very active in the business of sound-alike recordings. They would find a singer who sounded like a well-known artist of the time, such as Mario Lanza or Perry Como. The sound-alike singer would record an album of songs previously recorded by the better-known artist, which would be released with a facsimile of the "name" artist on the cover. The cover would prominently mention the popular artist (e.g., A Tribute To Mario Lanza), while the actual singer would be mentioned in very small print ("Sung by Enzo Stuarti"). Eventually, if the sound-alike became a name artist, the same record could be re-issued with a new title (Enzo Stuarti Sings). Some of the record pressings were of poor quality, as they were created from inferior grade vinyl, and often sounded very noisy.

Despite record companies lowering their prices, Synthetic Plastics said they remained successful due to their cooperation with the stores that sold them.

In 1964, the company changed its name to Peter Pan Industries because of their success in children's records under the name of Peter Pan Records. Throughout the 1960s, 1970s and early '80s, Peter Pan and its Power Records subsidiary became known for its licensed audio-story productions that featured characters from franchises ranging from DC Comics and Marvel Comics to Star Trek and The Six Million Dollar Man. In 1979, the beginning of the video business, Peter Pan Industries went into the video business and quickly became one of the leading video companies in the health and fitness video business with the introduction of step workouts, Walk Aerobics with Leslie Sansone, Spinning with Johnny G and Pilates/The Method workouts. They also introduced such successful fitness artists as Joanie Greggains, Denise Austin and Tony Little.

Daniel Kasen passed away in 1981 leaving his shares to his son Donald Kasen who became 50/50 partners with Martin Kasen who was the son of Daniel Kasen's brother Louis Kasen. Louis Kasen was partners with Daniel Kasen in Synthetic Plastics Company.

In June of 1989, Donald Kasen acquired Martin Kasen's (his cousin/partner's) shares leaving Donald as the sole owner and President/CEO of the then Peter Pan Industries. In 2006, Donald Kasen changed the name of the company to Inspired Studios, Inc.

In 2025, Inspired Studios, Inc. of New Jersey merged with Inspired Studios, Inc. of Florida.
