= Cy Leslie =

American businessman (1922–2008)

- Born: Seymour Marvin Leslie; December 16, 1922; New York
- Died: January 6, 2008 (aged 85); United States
- Occupation: Businessman
- Years active: 1947–2008

Seymour Marvin "Cy" Leslie (December 16, 1922 – January 6, 2008) was an American businessman, the founder of Pickwick Records, and the first president and founder of MGM/UA Home Entertainment Group. Pickwick Records aimed to make music more affordable, and carried such artists as Elvis Presley at various times. MGM Home Video was one of the first companies to enter the home video business, which today has become the home entertainment industry including DVD and other sales. He began his career by founding Voco Records, producing record greeting cards, and later children's records. He was Jewish.

== Education ==
Leslie received his Bachelor's degree from Syracuse University, before being deployed by the Army in World War II. Later, he received a business degree from Harvard Business School. He also received an honorary doctorate from Hofstra University in 1974.

== Family ==
Leslie married Barbara Miller. They had three daughters and four grandchildren.
