= Superman/Spider-Man and Spider-Man/Superman =

Comic book miniseries crossover

Superman/Spider-Man

Publication information
- Publisher: DC Comics
- Format: One-shot
- Genre: Superhero
- Publication date: March 2026
- No. of issues: 1
- Main characters: Superman; Spider-Man; DC Universe; Marvel Universe

Creative team
- Written by: Various
- Artist: Various

Spider-Man/Superman

Publication information
- Publisher: Marvel Comics
- Format: One-shot
- Genre: Superhero
- Publication date: April 2026
- No. of issues: 1
- Main characters: Spider-Man; Superman; Marvel Universe; DC Universe

Creative team
- Written by: Various
- Artist: Various

Superman/Spider-Man and Spider-Man/Superman is an American comic book intercompany crossover anthology one-shot issues presented by veteran publishers DC Comics and Marvel Comics, published in March and April 2026. The one-shots serves as the third and fourth crossover between Superman and Spider-Man, following Superman vs. The Amazing Spider-Man: The Battle of the Century (March 1976) and Superman and Spider-Man (July 1981). It also serves as a spiritual follow-up to the Deadpool/Batman and Batman/Deadpool one-shots (both published in 2025).

Superman/Spider-Man (March 2026) was released to coincide with the 50th anniversary of The Battle of the Century (March 1976).

== Publication history ==
In the early 1970s, author and literary agent David Obst suggested to Marvel Comics publisher Stan Lee and DC Comics editorial director Carmine Infantino that there should be a feature film crossover featuring Marvel's Spider-Man and DC's Superman characters. However, there was already a Superman movie planned by Warner Bros., and a series of Spider-Man TV movies, so instead the two companies settled for an oversize comic book entitled Superman vs. The Amazing Spider-Man: The Battle of the Century, published in 1976. The comic featured the heroes' most popular enemies, Lex Luthor and Doctor Octopus, respectively. It's sequel Superman and Spider-Man was published in 1981, story writer Jim Shooter chose Doctor Doom (more typically a Fantastic Four rogue) from Marvel, and the Parasite (a Superman rogue) from DC. Shooter also pitted Superman against the Hulk and Spider-Man against Wonder Woman.

In June 2025, a new collaborative project between Marvel and DC was announced in 2025 after more than two decades, with two one-shots featuring Deadpool and Batman, respectively. Deadpool/Batman was published by Marvel on September 17, 2025 and Batman/Deadpool was published by DC on November 19, 2025. In October 2025, it was announced by Marvel Comics and DC Comics respectively, that a second two–part intercompany crossover one-shots will be published, featuring Superman and Spider-Man. Superman/Spider-Man will be published by DC in March 2026 and Spider-Man/Superman will be published by Marvel in April 2026.

In December 2025, it was announced Superman/Spider-Man #1 would be written by Mark Waid, art by Jorge Jiménez, and publish on March 26th. The one-shot will feature seven additional stories written by DC-veteran writers Tom King, Matt Fraction, Sean Murphy, Gail Simone, Christopher Priest, Greg Rucka and Jeff Lemire. The stories will feature crossovers between Lois Lane & Mary Jane Watson, Jimmy Olsen & Carnage, Superboy & Spider-Man 2099, Power Girl & the Punisher, Superboy-Prime & Spider-Man, the Daily Planet & the Daily Bugle and Pa Kent & Uncle Ben. In February 2026, it was announced Spider-Man/Superman #1 would be written by Brad Meltzer, art by Pepe Larraz, and publish on April 22nd. The one-shot features seven additional stories written by Marvel-veteran writers Jason Aaron, Brian Michael Bendis, Geoff Johns, Joe Kelly, Jeph Loeb, Stephanie Phillips, Louise Simonson and Dan Slott. The stories features crossovers between Spider-Man Noir & the Golden Age Superman, the Spider-Man Family & the Superman Family, the Mighty Thor & Wonder Woman, the Hobgoblin & Steel, Gwen Stacy & Lana Lang, Spider-Man (Miles Morales) & Superman and Spider-Gwen & Supergirl.

== List of comics ==
Titles	Featured characters	Creative team	Publication date	Ref.
Superman/Spider-Man #1 (DC Comics)
"Truth, Justice And Great Responsibility"	Superman created by Jerry Siegel and Joe Shuster; Spider-Man created by Stan Lee and Steve Ditko	Writer: Mark Waid; Artist/Inker: Jorge Jiménez; Colorist: Tomeu Morey; Letterer: Tom Napolitano; Editor: Marie Javins	Mar 25, 2026	
"The World's Finest"	Lois Lane created by Jerry Siegel and Joe Shuster; Mary Jane Watson created by Stan Lee, Steve Ditko and John Romita Sr.	Writer: Tom King; Artist: Jim Lee; Inker: Scott Williams; Colorist: Alex Sinclair; Letterer: Pat Brosseau; Editor: Marie Javins	Mar 25, 2026	
"Pages"	Superboy-Prime created by Elliot S. Maggin and Curt Swan; Spider-Man created by Stan Lee and Steve Ditko	Writer: Christopher Priest; Artist/Inker: Daniel Sampere; Colorist: Alejandro Śanchez; Letterer: Willie Schubert; Editor: Marie Javins	Mar 25, 2026	
"Beyond the Cobwebs of Tomorrow"	Superboy created by Jerry Siegel and Joe Shuster; Spider-Man 2099 created by Peter David and Rick Leonardi	Writer/Artist/Inker: Sean Murphy; Colorist: Simon Gough; Letterer: Andworld Design; Editor: Marie Javins	Mar 25, 2026	
"Jimmy Con Carnage"	Jimmy Olsen created by Jerry Siegel, Joe Shuster and Bob Maxwell; Carnage created by David Michelinie and Mark Bagley	Writer: Matt Fraction; Artist/Inker: Steve Lieber; Colorist: Nathan Fairbarin; Letterer: Clayton Cowles; Editor: Marie Javins	Mar 25, 2026	
"The Bridge"	Jonathan Kent created by Jerry Siegel and Joe Shuster; Ben Parker created by Stan Lee and Steve Ditko	Writer: Jeff Lemire; Artist/Inker: Rafa Sandoval; Colorist: Ulises Arroela; Letterer: Becca Carey; Editor: Marie Javins	Mar 25, 2026	
"Bias"	Daily Planet created by Jerry Siegel and Joe Shuster; Daily Bugle created by Carl Burgos, Stan Lee and Jack Kirby	Writer: Greg Rucka; Artist/Inker: Nicola Scott; Colorist: Marcelo Maiolo; Letterer: Ariana Maher; Editor: Marie Javins	Mar 25, 2026	
"Blind Date"	Power Girl created by Gerry Conway, Ric Estrada and Wally Wood; Punisher created by Gerry Conway, John Romita Sr. and Ross Andru	Writer: Gail Simone; Artist/Inker: Belén Ortega; Colorist: Jordie Bellaire; Letterer: Lucas Gattone; Editor: Marie Javins	Mar 25, 2026	
Spider-Man/Superman #1 (Marvel Comics)
"Our Kryptonite!"	Spider-Man created by Stan Lee and Steve Ditko; Superman created by Jerry Siegel and Joe Shuster	Writer: Brad Meltzer; Artist: Pepe Larraz; Colorist: Matthew Wilson; Letterer: Clayton Cowles; Editor: Nick Lowe	Apr 22, 2026	
"Metropolis Marvels"	Spider-Man Noir created by David Hine and Fabrice Sapolsky; Golden Age Superman created by Jerry Siegel and Joe Shuster	Writer: Dan Slott; Artist: Marcos Martin; Colorist: Muntsa Vicente; Letterer: Joe Caramagna; Editor: Tom Brevoort	Apr 22, 2026	
"Sweethearts"	Gwen Stacy created by Stan Lee and Steve Ditko; Lana Lang created by Bill Finger and John Sikela	Writer: Joe Kelly; Artist: Humberto Ramos; Colorist: Edgar Delgado; Letterer: Joe Caramagna; Editor: Mark Basso	Apr 22, 2026	
"Identity War"	Mysterio created by Stan Lee and Steve Ditko; Superman created by Jerry Siegel and Joe Shuster; Thing created by Stan Lee and Jack Kirby	Writer: Geoff Johns; Artist: Gary Frank; Colorist: Brand Anderson; Letterer: Joe Caramagna; Editor: Mark Basso	Apr 22, 2026	
"Ghosting"	Hobgoblin created by Roger Stern and John Romita Jr.; Steel created by Louise Simonson and Jon Bogdanove	Writer: Louise Simonson; Artist: Todd Nauck; Colorist: Rachelle Rosenberg; Letterer: Joe Caramagna; Editor: Mark Basso	Apr 22, 2026	
"Remarkable"	Spider-Gwen created by Jason Latour and Robbi Rodriguez; Supergirl created by Otto Binder and Al Plastino	Writer: Stephanie Phillips; Artist/Colorist: Phil Noto; Letterer: Joe Caramagna; Editor: Mark Basso	Apr 22, 2026	
"The One Thing..."	Miles Morales created by Brian Michael Bendis and Sara Pichelli; Superman created by Jerry Siegel and Joe Shuster	Writer: Brian Michael Bendis; Artist: Sara Pichelli; Colorist: Federico Blue; Letterer: Joe Caramagna; Editor: Mark Basso	Apr 22, 2026	
"The Wondrous & The Worthy"	Mighty Thor created by Stan Lee, Larry Lieber and Jack Kirby; Wonder Woman created by William Moulton Marston	Writer: Jason Aaron; Artist: Russell Dauterman; Colorist: Matthew Wilson; Letterer: Joe Caramagna; Editor: Mark Basso	Apr 22, 2026	
"One of Those Days"	Spider-Man created by Stan Lee and Steve Ditko; Superman created by Jerry Siegel and Joe Shuster	Writer: Jeph Loeb; Artist: Jim Cheung; Colorist: Jay David Ramos; Letterer: Joe Caramagna; Editor: Mark Basso	Apr 22, 2026	

== Superman/Spider-Man (March 2026) ==
=== "Truth, Justice And Great Responsibility" ===
Deep beneath New York, Otto Octavius works on a new invention with his AI assistant, D-Cern. Frustrated when D-Cern names Will Magnus and Bruce Banner as top scientists, Octavius destroys it, resentful of being dismissed as just a criminal. A mysterious force, Brainiac then takes control of his mechanical arms and offers a deal. Aboard Brainiac's orbiting ship, he reveals he is infected with a mental virus and needs Octavius' help to spread it to humanity. Seeing a chance for recognition and knowledge, Octavius agrees, building a neural network to transmit the virus using stolen radioactive materials and Brainiac's ship as a relay. Meanwhile, Peter Parker travels with Clark Kent to Metropolis for a Daily Bugle assignment. At S.T.A.R. Labs, they learn radioactive materials, specifically Kryptonite-based tech has been stolen. Realizing Octavius is involved, they suit up as Spider-Man and Superman. Soon, a fast-neutron signal spreads across the city, causing chaos and deadly accidents while weakening Superman with Kryptonite.

The heroes struggle but continue rescuing civilians. Suspecting a partner, Spider-Man confronts Brainiac on Earth while Superman heads into space, only to face Octavius, who has armed his tentacles with Kryptonite. Brainiac overwhelms Spider-Man with predictive calculations before collapsing the building and escaping into a distant backup body. With Brainiac gone, his ship loses control and plummets toward Metropolis. Spider-Man manually shuts down the Kryptonite emitter despite exhaustion, while Superman regains strength and stops the crashing ship. Octavius is arrested. Peter gets paid for his photos, and he and Clark reflect on responsibility and sacrifice. Declining a ride home, Spider-Man instead joins Superman for a tour of Metropolis, starting with the Superman Museum.

=== "The World's Finest" ===
Lois Lane and Mary Jane Watson are stuck on a bus dangling off a bridge while Spider-Man holds it up with webs and Superman fights a Sentinel. With the heroes occupied, the two reflect on their chaotic lives as the love interests to superheroes. They met by chance; Lois heading to the Daily Planet and Mary Jane to a photoshoot. After climbing the web, Lois realizes the Sentinel is targeting both a mutate and an alien, and Mary Jane figures it must be hunting a nearby mutant. That mutant is Gambit, searching for cards to destroy it. Lois gives him a deck she had, and with Spider-Man and Superman weakening the Sentinel, Gambit destroys it using charged cards. Afterward, Lois and Mary Jane share a warm goodbye and reunite with the men they love, ready to head home.

=== "Pages" ===
Superboy-Prime breaks into Peter Parker's apartment to take the Symbiote but is caught when Peter returns. Irritated, Peter dons the black suit and joins Prime in stopping crimes across New York. Prime explains he needs Spider-Man to come to his "real world," where Spider-Man is only a comic book character. As they work together, they realize they share similarities. Prime then punches through reality, taking Spider-Man to a space between universes where worlds appear as comic pages. While traveling this "library," Prime warns him not to fall into any page. They encounter the High Evolutionary, who expects Prime to deliver the symbiote in exchange for leaving him alone after Prime freed his prisoners. Shocked, Spider-Man refuses to be abandoned. Prime admits he just wants to go home and may not be a hero, but helps Spider-Man resist. Remembering Uncle Ben's lesson, "With great power comes great responsibility", Spider-Man urges Prime to stand against the High Evolutionary. Though Prime suggests escaping, Spider-Man convinces him to stay and fight.

=== "Beyond the Cobwebs of Tomorrow" ===
A time-displaced Miguel O'Hara, the Spider-Man of 2099, swings across the streets and buildings of 2039 Neo Gotham. He encounters a time-displaced Superboy, who has been monitoring his activities and believes they could work together. However, Spider-Man does not trust Superboy and suspects that he may be working for Doom. Their encounter is observed by Terry McGinnis, the Batman of 2039, while an elderly Bruce Wayne comments on the situation through Batman's communicator. Batman asks the two heroes to explain why they are in Neo Gotham. Spider-Man explains that his world is ruled by Doom, and that the only way to stop his rise to power is to prevent a corporate merger between Alchemax and Lexcorp, which would develop technology benefiting Doom in the long run. Superboy shares a similar story: he comes from the 30th century, where the same merger allowed Lex Luthor to merge his consciousness with Vril Dox, becoming the most dangerous threat ever faced by the Legion of Super-Heroes. Realizing that their stories and motivations align, the three heroes agree to work together. Their first stop is the Source Wall, the last place where Luthor was seen before his disappearance.

=== "Jimmy Con Carnage" ===
Daily Planet photographer Jimmy Olsen has been invited to work at the Daily Bugle. The Bugle's editor-in-chief J. Jonah Jameson demands photos of Spider-Man from Jimmy and the other Bugle photographers—Peter Parker and Phil Sheldon. As Jimmy sets out to complete his assignment, Peter advises him to avoid any dark alleyways while he goes off with Mary Jane Watson and Felicia Hardy. Jimmy, however, does not heed Peter's advice and, as soon as Peter is out of sight, explores Manhattan with reckless abandon. He catches a glimpse of Spider-Man's silhouette within a dark alleyway and chases after it, only to discover that it is actually Carnage. Carnage attacks Jimmy as he tries to switch on his signal watch to call Superman for help, but the device is in the middle of an update. Later, the Daily Bugle publishes an edition denouncing Spider-Man as Jimmy's murderer and honoring his memory. Peter is frustrated because Carnage is clearly visible in the photo, but Jameson does not care, as long as he has material to portray Spider-Man negatively.

=== "The Bridge" ===
Decades ago, Jonathan Kent was driving along a Kansas highway when he came across Ben Parker calling for help from any passing driver. A bridge had collapsed, and a tornado was heading their way. Jonathan told Ben to get into his truck so they could wait out the storm at the Kent farm. Suddenly, Ben heard a noise coming from beneath the bridge, and Jonathan followed him to investigate. When they reached the riverbank, they discovered two children trapped in the water. Working together, Jonathan and Ben rescued the children and brought them to the farm, where they remained safe and protected from the storm.

In the present day, Superman and Spider-Man are surprised to learn that their adoptive fathers once met, leading them to conclude that they are more alike than they had realized.

=== "Bias" ===
Daily Planet reporter Lois Lane and Daily Bugle editor-in-chief J. Jonah Jameson are invited to Jack Ryder's talk show, where they discuss their differing views on superheroes who hide behind masks. The exchange is observed by Clark Kent from behind the scenes and by Spider-Man from above the stage. Lois is quick to bring up the Daily Bugle's negative coverage of Spider-Man. Jameson responds that the duty of the press is to speak truth to power, in his view, Spider-Man does whatever he wants and answers to no one. Lois asks whether Jameson's issue stems from Spider-Man wearing a mask, and Jameson readily agrees. He argues that many heroes he trusts do not hide their identities, citing examples such as the Fantastic Four, Wonder Woman, Captain America, and Superman. Jameson suggests that Superman enjoys such a strong reputation because he does not wear a mask. Lois counters that some superheroes choose to wear masks to protect their friends and loved ones. However, Jameson insists that if superheroes truly have nothing to hide, they should not have secret identities. After the discussion ends, Lois feels satisfied with what she has said and leaves the set with Clark, while Spider-Man watches from above, feeling a hint of jealousy toward him.

=== "Blind Date" ===
For months, Frank Castle has infiltrated the supervillain bar "The Bar with No Name," posing as a bouncer and gathering intelligence about its customers. On a rainy night, Karen Starr arrives, reluctant to meet her blind date, Paul Rabin. Before entering, she briefly interacts with Castle outside the bar, offering him her umbrella as a sign of courtesy. Though Paul is polite, Karen feels uncomfortable and is not enjoying the date. Suddenly, Castle barges in, suited up as the Punisher, demanding that Karen and Paul leave the bar for their safety. Karen, now as Power Girl, intervenes, believing the Punisher is there to kill Paul. The villains at the bar—Catman, Chameleon, Diamondback, Firefly, Gentleman Ghost, and Taskmaster—are there to collect a bounty on Vandal Savage and have mistaken Paul for Savage, making the date a setup. Paul escapes while the duo defeats the villains. Power Girl and the Punisher then share their stories over drinks, finishing their conversation by agreeing to continue their team-up elsewhere.

The story's writer, Gail Simone, confirmed this was a tribute to Gerry Conway, who created both Punisher and Power Girl as well as the original Superman vs. The Amazing Spider-Man crossover. Conway passed away from pancreatic cancer shortly after the official release.

== Spider-Man/Superman (April 2026) ==
=== "Our Kryptonite" ===
Superman and Spider-Man awaken underneath a gigantic pile of rubble because of a plot by the Green Goblin and Lex Luthor, with Superman being weakened due to Kryptonite exposure. As the rubble begins to collapse around them, Spider-Man begins pushing the roof of their enclosed space up, asking Superman to talk to him as to distract him from the intense physical strength and exertion needed to lift up the roof without his help. Superman asks Spider-Man why he does the superhero work that he does, and Spider-Man admits it is out of guilt.

Eventually, the Venom Symbiote starts to attach itself to Spider-Man, then transfers itself to Superman. As the transfer occurs, the two superheroes share a mind for a brief second and realize each other's secret identities as Peter Parker and Clark Kent. A newly Venomized Superman breaks through the rubble and begins fighting Spider-Man, as Green Goblin, Lex Luthor, and many other members of Superman and Spider-Man's rogues galleries watch on. After Spider-Man disposes of the Kryptonite Pumpkin Bomb, Superman eventually breaks free of Venom's influence, and the two superheroes take on the Green Goblin and Lex Luthor as the rest of the villains run away.

A few weeks later, an out of costume Peter stands by the grave of his Uncle Ben, talking about some recent fights as Spider-Man. Clark joins him, saying that he learned of Uncle Ben and many other parts of Peter's life while the two of them were linked by Venom. Clark invites Peter and his Aunt May over for dinner with Ma and Pa Kent; an invitation that Peter accepts. As the five of them enjoy dinner at the Kent Residence in Smallville, the story ends with a thank you to Stan Lee, Steve Ditko, Jerry Siegel, and Joe Shuster.

=== "Metropolis Marvels" ===
Taking place in 1938, the kingpin of Metropolis, Lex Luthor, has framed J. Jonah Jameson for his crimes. With ten minutes before Jameson is executed, Spider-Man Noir tracks down Luthor to his office and attempts to kill him. He is stopped by Golden Age Superman, who melts his guns and breaks out of his webbing. Superman grabs Luthor and takes him to the governor's office to clear Jameson's name. Jameson, Kent, and Parker meet at a diner shortly afterwards, where Jameson praises Kent's journalistic skills despite the story being published in the Daily Planet instead of the Bugle and reprimands Parker for not clearing his name in time.

=== "Sweethearts" ===
While at a scholar fair at Empire State University, Gwen Stacy befriends Lana Lang after the two debate over the lecture they attended and deal with some other students gawking over them. As they have lunch, they discuss how the men of their respective homes are easily intimidated by intelligent and confident women and reflect on their respective boyfriends, Peter and Clark. They discuss how similar they are between their backgrounds as orphans, their difficulties opening themselves up, flimsy excuses when they're late, and how they inspire their loved ones. Clark and Peter then arrive, with Clark covered in sand following a battle with Sandman at Coney Island, and Peter's soaking wet after fighting Metallo on a pirate ship. When they both make feeble excuses over their appearances, their girlfriends burst into laughter.

=== "Identity War" ===
Chaos has erupted around the world, resulting in various civilians, heroes, and villains all fighting each other. The Thing reveals that Mysterio has teamed up with Saturn Queen and received a rage-powered Red Lantern. The two have the Hulk succumb to the Red Lantern, which in turn infects everyone around the world with his blind fury. The Thing teams up with the few remaining heroes who managed to shake off the rage: Superman, Stargirl, Captain America, She-Hulk, and Green Lantern. Superman deduces the only plan left to cure the world is to find a way to calm the Hulk down. As the six heroes confront the Hulk, Thing gets ready to beat him up, but Superman instead sympathizes with the monster and begins talking to him. His calm and compassionate approach works as the Hulk reverts to Bruce Banner. With everyone back to normal, the heroes defeat Mysterio and Saturn Queen and round up the rest of the villains.

After the fight, the Thing talks with Superman on what Mysterio was aiming for. Superman believes he wanted to convince everyone to hate each other because fighting without hatred is pointless. While acknowledging Grimm's concerns on how people yearn to be angry at something, Superman tells him that anger and conflicts aren't always resolved with fists. Heeding his advice, Grimm visits Banner in his cell to talk and share doughnuts.

=== "Ghosting" ===
In Metropolis, the Hobgoblin has stolen a new piece of technology from Steel Works called "Steel Dust." The technology makes the user appear invisible by repelling light, shields the user from tracking devices, and allows them to evade other Steel Works technology. Hobgoblin is pursued by Steel as the two fly through Metropolis. He begins to cover himself with the Steel Dust, enabling him to evade Steel's hammer; however, it disrupts the technology in his glider. Hobgoblin is swiftly stopped by Mjölnir. Thor brings him down from the sky to Steel, and the two heroes bump their respective hammers as it's revealed that the two allowed Hobgoblin to steal the dust to test it out.

=== "Remarkable" ===
Supergirl arrives at the Daily Planet after reports of Spider-Man sightings around the building. She is disappointed to find Ghost-Spider there instead, holding an autograph book, who is also similarly disappointed expecting Superman. Using her super-vision, Supergirl spots Livewire searching for Superman and causing a disturbance in Metropolis. Declaring that she works alone, Supergirl flies to confront Livewire. Ghost-Spider soon arrives as well. Livewire attempts to attack Supergirl with electricity, but while she is distracted, Ghost-Spider swings in and knocks Livewire out. Supergirl calls Ghost-Spider a "showoff," and Ghost-Spider retorts by calling her "unremarkable." Despite this exchange, the two develop a silent respect for one another. As Supergirl flies off, she tosses Ghost-Spider her autograph book, having already signed it.

=== "The One Thing..." ===
As Miles Morales is swinging through New York as Spider-Man, he notices a giant explosion in the distance. He initially speculates that it might be a piece of Stark tech or a meteor but soon discovers Superman with a large chunk of Kryptonite attached to his chest. Spider-Man webs it up and throws it away, and it explodes in the distance. Superman tells Spider-Man that Brainiac has teamed up with Dormammu to bring about a Dark Dimension apocalypse. As Superman recovers from the effects of the Kryptonite, Spider-Man asks him for advice on how to be a hero, with Superman stating that he should trust his own ability to want to do the right thing. Superman and Spider-Man then go to fight Brainiac and Dormammu.

=== "The Wondrous & The Worthy" ===
After Darkseid overthrows Odin to become the All-Father and invade Earth with an army of demons, Jane Foster, having taken the role of Thor, meets Wonder Woman on the battlefield. Jane feels nervous and insecure as a superhero in comparison to Wonder Woman, but Wonder Woman is able to reassure her of her own strength, despite developing cancer and becoming physically frail and sick without Mjolnir's strength. Thor and Wonder Woman then continue the fight against Darkseid alongside the many other heroes of their respective universes.

=== "One of Those Days" ===
Superman finds Spider-Man quietly sitting on the George Washington Bridge. Peter asks Clark if he's had days where he's failed to save someone he loves, remembering his own failure to save Gwen Stacy. The Man of Steel tells the wallcrawler that he's learned there isn't a right way to grieve and that while death is a certainty, it's ultimately what a person does when they are alive is what makes the difference. He concludes that even if they have terrible days, they'll still have better days to help them overcome the losses, and wishes him well before flying off.

== Reception ==
Superman/Spider-Man #1 received highly positive reviews, with critics praising the main story by Waid and Jiménez for its joyful, nostalgic, and well-characterized team-up.

== Related ==
- The Uncanny X-Men and The New Teen Titans (1982) – A one-shot intercompany crossover, features the two companies' teams of superheroes, Marvel's X-Men, and DC's New Teen Titans. In the story, the X-Men and the New Teen Titans team-up against the New God Darkseid, aided by Metron, attempting to harness the power of the Phoenix Force.
- DC vs. Marvel (February to May 1996) – A four issue intercompany crossover miniseries, which pitted Marvel Comics superheroes against their DC Comics counterparts in battle. The outcome of each battle was determined by reader ballot, which were distributed in advance to comic book stores.
  - Amalgam Comics: a collaborative publishing imprint shared by DC and Marvel, in which the two comic book publishers merged their characters into new ones.
- JLA/Avengers (September 2003 to March 2004) – A four issue intercompany crossover miniseries, features the two companies' teams of superheroes, DC Comics' Justice League of America and Marvel's Avengers. The crossover is officially canon for both companies and the cosmic egg has appeared in DC's Trinity and in Marvel's Official Handbook of the Marvel Universe.

== See also ==
- List of Superman comics
- List of Spider-Man titles
- Publication history of DC Comics crossover events
- Publication history of Marvel Comics crossover events
