= Intercompany crossovers in comics =

Intercompany crossovers in comic books consist of comics in which characters and other elements owned by one publisher appear together and interact with ones owned by another. Such occurrences within the medium of comics as opposed to other types of media are notable, given the regularity of canonical crossovers between characters and series under a single publisher, particularly in DC Comics and Marvel Comics, where they constantly affect mainstream continuity for the parties involved. As a result, intercompany comics crossovers are less common, and usually take the form of one-shots or miniseries that are not canonical to the history of the characters that are featured.

Notable crossovers between Marvel and DC include 1976's Superman vs. The Amazing Spider-Man: The Battle of the Century, 1996's DC vs. Marvel, 2003's JLA/Avengers and the Amalgam Comics imprint, which featured original characters conceived as amalgamations of famous DC and Marvel characters. Examples of crossovers between the "big two" and smaller publishers include Batman/Teenage Mutant Ninja Turtles and Archie Meets the Punisher. Other collaborations between comic publishers might not consist of conventional crossovers and instead feature original characters or ones from other media, such as WildStorm (a subsidiary of DC Comics) and Dynamite Entertainment's 2007 miniseries Freddy vs. Jason vs. Ash. In 2025, Ian Flynn wrote the five-issue miniseries DC x Sonic the Hedgehog, a crossover between the characters from DC Comics and Sonic the Hedgehog franchise.

== List of crossovers ==
=== DC Comics, Marvel Comics and Amalgam Comics ===
- Superman and Spider-Man (1976–2026)
  - Superman vs. The Amazing Spider-Man: The Battle of the Century (1976): Superman and Spider-Man must stop a world domination/destruction plot hatched in tandem by their respective arch-nemeses, Lex Luthor and Doctor Octopus.
  - Superman and Spider-Man (1981): Superman and Spider-Man battle the Parasite and Doctor Doom, with the Hulk and Wonder Woman guest-starring.
  - Superman/Spider-Man (2026): A virus infected Brainiac teams with Dr. Octopus to transfer the virus into the minds of humans on Earth. Superman and Spider-Man team up to put a stop to it.
    - Backup stories:
      - Lois Lane & Mary Jane: While their respective husbands battle a Sentinel, Mary Jane and Lois engage in girl talk. Lois ultimately gives the X-Man Gambit some of her playing cards so Gambit can help Superman and Spider-Man finish off the giant robot.
      - Superboy-Prime & The Amazing Spider-Man: Set in the 1980s, Superboy finds himself in the Marvel Universe and lures the black costume clad Spider-Man into another dimension so he can hand him over to an alternate version of the High Evolutionary. Ultimately Superboy changes his mind and teams up with Spider-Man.
      - Superboy & Spider-Man 2099: Spider-Man 2099 heads to 2039 to stop the corporations Lexcorp and Alchemax from merging. This merger will have major repercussions in the future. He encounters and then teams up with Superboy (from the 30th century) and Batman Beyond.
      - Superman's Pal Jimmy Olsen & Carnage: Jimmy gets a job at the Daily Bugle and while trying to find Spider-Man to photograph, he encounters and is murdered by Carnage.
      - Jonathan Kent & Ben Parker: Superman and Spider-Man talk about their respective fathers and how they had a huge impact on their lives. They don't realize that their fathers met years before they were born, teaming up to save some children during a storm.
      - Daily Planet & Daily Bugle: J. Jonah Jameson has a nationally televised debate with Lois Lane about the merits of opinion in the media.
      - Power Girl & Punisher: When the Punisher makes his way to an underground club to hunt supervillians, he encounters and teams up with Power Girl, who was there on a blind date. After the bad guys are defeated, the two of them go out together.
    - Spider-Man/Superman (2026): Spider-Man and Superman team up to battle Lex Luthor and the Green Goblin who send the Venom symbiote to possess Superman. After the heroes win, Clark Kent invites Peter Parker and Aunt May over to have dinner with him and the Kents.
      - Backup stories:
        - Spider-Man Noir & Superman: In 1938, Spider-Man Noir and the new hero Superman team up to defeat Lex Luthor and clear J Jonah Jameson's name.
        - Gwen Stacy & Lana Lang: The two college girls meet on campus and talk about the two guys they have crushes on; Peter Parker and Clark Kent.
        - Mysterio vs. Superman: Mysterio teams with Saturn Queen to channel rage through the Hulk (via a Red Lantern) to cause mass chaos. This causes heroes and villains across America to battle one another. A group of heroes led by Superman and the Thing save the day.
        - Hobgoblin vs. Steel: The Hobgoblin steals an invention from Steel, only for Steel to team up with Thor to take down the villain.
        - Ghost-Spider & Supergirl: The two heroines team up to stop Livewire.
        - Miles Morales: Spider-Man & Superman: The two heroes team up to battle Brainiac and Dormammu.
        - Symbiotes in Metropolis: The Mighty Thor and Wonder Woman team up to battle symbiote-infused Parademons (called Paravenoms) from Apokolips.
        - Spider-Man & Superman: When Spider-Man remembers the day Gwen Stacy died, Superman comforts him and offers him advice.
- Batman and Hulk (1981)
  - Batman vs. The Incredible Hulk (1981): Batman and the Hulk battle the Joker and the Shaper of Worlds.
- Teen Titans and X-Men (1982)
  - The Uncanny X-Men and The New Teen Titans (1982): The two teams must unite to battle Darkseid, Deathstroke, and Dark Phoenix.
- Batman and Punisher (1994)
  - Batman/Punisher: Lake of Fire (1994): The Punisher and Batman meet, and things do not go well.
  - Punisher/Batman: Deadly Knights (1994): Batman meets the Punisher again, and things worsen.
- Batman and Spider-Man (1995–1997)
  - Spider-Man and Batman: Disordered Minds (1995): The Joker and Carnage meet when behavioral psychiatrist Cassandra Briar attempts to use the two killers as tests for a computer chip that will 'lobotomize' their homicidal instincts.
  - Batman & Spider-Man: New Age Dawning (1997): Ra's al Ghul manipulates the Kingpin to his side and begins plans for worldwide devastation.
- Darkseid and Galactus (1995)
  - Darkseid vs. Galactus: The Hunger (1995): Galactus tries to devour Apokolips.
- Green Lantern and Silver Surfer (1995)
  - Green Lantern/Silver Surfer: Unholy Alliances (1995): Green Lantern and the Silver Surfer battle Parallax and Thanos.
- DC and Marvel (1996–1998)
  - DC Versus Marvel (1996): Two brothers who personify the DC and Marvel Universes become aware of the other's existence and challenge each other to a series of duels involving each universe's respective superheroes. The losing universe will cease to exist. The story has an out-of-universe component in that although there are 11 primary battles, the storyline does not show one side as victorious. The "brothers" resolve the situation by temporarily creating a new universe, called the Amalgam Universe, which is occupied by merged versions of many of the heroes. An inter-dimensional character called Access eventually manages to restore the universes to their normal state.
  - Amalgam Comics (1996–1997): An imprint owned by both DC and Marvel that published one-shots set on a fusion of New Earth and Earth-616 called the Amalgam Universe or Earth-9602.
    - Amazon (1996): A story following the fusion of Wonder Woman and Storm.
    - Doctor Strangefate (1996): Two stories following the fusion of Doctor Fate, Doctor Strange, and Professor X.
    - Assassins (1996): Two stories following the genderswapped fusion of Deathstroke and Daredevil and the fusion of Catwoman and Elektra.
    - JLX (1996): Two stories following the fusions of the Justice League and the X-Men.
    - Legends of the Dark Claw (1996): Two stories following the fusion of Batman and Wolverine.
    - Super-Soldier (1996): Two stories following the fusion of Superman and Captain America.
    - Bruce Wayne, Agent of S.H.I.E.L.D. (1996): A story following the fusion of Bruce Wayne and Nick Fury.
    - Bullets and Bracelets (1996): A story following the fusion of Diana Prince and Lynn Michaels as well as the fusion of Steve Trevor and the Punisher.
    - Magneto and the Magnetic Men (1996): A story following Magneto and the fusions of the Metal Men and the Brotherhood of Mutants.
    - Speed Demon (1996): A story following the fusion of The Flash and Ghost Rider.
    - Spider-Boy (1996): A story following the fusion of Superboy and Spider-Man.
    - X-Patrol (1996): Two stories following the fusions of Doom Patrol and X-Force.
    - Bat-Thing (1997): Two stories following the fusion of Man-Bat and Man-Thing.
    - Dark Claw Adventures (1997): A parallel of the Batman: The Animated Series spin-off comic, The Batman Adventures, that supposedly features the animated series version of Dark Claw.
    - Generation Hex (1997): Two stories set in an alternate version of the Amalgam Universe's Wild West that feature the fusions of Generation X and DC's various Wild West characters. The team name is an amalgamation of Generation X and Jonah Hex's names.
    - JLX Unleashed (1997): The JLX must team up with the Judgement League Avengers (a fusion of the Justice League and the Avengers) to defeat Fin Fang Flame (a fusion of Brimstone and Fin Fang Foom).
    - Lobo the Duck (1997): Two stories set in an alternate Amalgam Universe where various heroes have been murdered and it is up to the fusion of Lobo and Howard the Duck to find the murderer.
    - Super-Soldier: Man of War (1997): Two stories featuring Super-Soldier set during World War II in the style of Golden Age comics.
    - Challengers of the Fantastic (1997): Two stories following the fusions of the Challengers of the Unknown and the Fantastic Four.
    - The Exciting X-Patrol (1997): X-Patrol must defeat Brother Brood, the fusion of Brother Blood and Brood.
    - Iron Lantern (1997): Two stories featuring the fusion of Green Lantern and Iron Man.
    - The Magnetic Men featuring Magneto (1997): Two stories featuring Magneto and the Magnetic Men facing off against the Sinister Society, a fusion of the Secret Society of Super Villains and the Sinister Six.
    - Spider-Boy Team-Up (1997): Spider-Boy teams up with the Legion of Galactic Guardians 2099, the fusions of the Legion of Super-Heroes, and the Guardians of the Galaxy.
    - Thorion of the New Asgods (1997): Two stories following the fusion of Orion and Thor.
  - DC/Marvel: All Access (1996–1997): Various aspects of each company's main universe start transporting from one another and it is up to Access to prevent them from merging again.
  - Unlimited Access (1997–1998): Access' powers start acting up and send him and others across time and space.
- Superman and Silver Surfer (1997)
  - Silver Surfer/Superman (1997): The Last Son of Krypton meets the Herald of Galactus.
- Batman and Captain America (1997)
  - Batman/Captain America (1997): The two heroes, mortals fighting alongside the mightiest of beings, must fight a threat to both worlds.
- Batman and Daredevil (1997–2000)
  - Daredevil/Batman: Eye for an Eye (1997): Batman and Daredevil must work together to defeat Two-Face and Mr. Hyde.
  - Batman/Daredevil: King of New York (2000): Batman and Daredevil must work together again to defeat Ra's al Ghul and the Kingpin.
- Superman and Fantastic Four (1999)
  - Superman/Fantastic Four: The Infinite Destruction (1999): Superman and the Fantastic Four must unite to stop the Cyborg Superman and Galactus.
- Superman and Hulk (1999)
  - The Incredible Hulk vs. Superman (1999)
- Justice League and Avengers (2003)
  - JLA/Avengers (2003): Krona, an exiled Oan, travels across the Multiverse and destroys universes, seeking the truth of creation. When he arrives in the Marvel Universe, the Grandmaster, wanting to save his universe, proposes that they play a game.
- Superboy and Spider-Man (2015)
  - Spider-Verse (2015): The fusion of Superboy and Spider-Man from the Amalgam Universe, Spider-Boy, can be seen in the final panel of "It's the Little Things" from Spider-Verse #2.
- Batman and Deadpool (2025):
  - Deadpool/Batman (2025): The Joker hires Deadpool to capture Batman. The heroes then work together to stop the villain.
    - Backup stories:
      - Captain America & Wonder Woman: In a shared universe, the two heroes have been battling villains from World War II to the future.
      - Jeff! & Krypto: The two super pets play long distance volleyball.
      - Daredevil & Green Arrow: The heroes battle The League of Shadows and Count Vertigo in Hell's Kitchen New York.
      - Rocket Raccoon & Green Lantern: The Guardians of the Galaxy and the Guardians of the Universe swap heroes. This allows Rocket to wear a Green Lantern ring.
      - Old Man Logan & Batman: The Dark Knight: The aged heroes get into a fight to the finish.
      - Logo: An Amalgam Comics story where Logo (Wolverine/Lobo) bursts on the scene.
  - Batman/Deadpool (2025): When a romantic fling between Eternity and Kismet causes reality to be distorted, Batman and Deadpool team with Grant Morrison to stop Cassandra Nova. The story features the return of the Amalgam Comics character Dark Claw, and the two heroes merging briefly into Dead Bat.
    - Backup stories:
      - John Constantine: Hellblazer & Doctor Strange: When a disruption in magic causes beings from the two universes to battle one another (Mephisto vs Neron and Ghost Rider vs Swamp Thing), John Constantine seeks out Doctor Strange to put things right.
      - Nightwing & Laura Kinney: Wolverine: Dick and Laura team up to rescue Laura's sister Gabby from Killer Croc.
      - Harley Quinn & The Incredible Hulk: The Hulk and Harley battle a robot biker mouse and toxic waste mutated killer hot dogs at an amusement park.
      - Static & Ms. Marvel: The two heroes team up to battle a kaiju.
- The Flash and Fantastic Four (2025)
  - The Flash/Fantastic Four (2025): The Flash and the Fantastic Four team up to battle Gorilla Grodd across time.
- Shazam and Thor (2025)
  - Thor/Shazam! (2025): Thor and Captain Marvel team up to battle Mister Mind, who has stolen the powers of ten beings across both universes.
- Supergirl and Blade (2026)
  - Supergirl/Blade (2026)
- Aquaman and Jeff the Land Shark (2026)
  - It's Jeff!/Aquaman (2026)

==== DC Comics ====
- Fortnite crossovers (Epic Games)
  - Batman/Fortnite: Zero Point
    - Batman/Fortnite: Foundation
- DC x Sonic the Hedgehog (DC and Sega)

===== Milestone Media =====
- Worlds Collide (1994): The DC superheroes meet their Milestone Comics counterparts.
- Milestone Returns

===== WildStorm Productions =====
- Planetary crossovers
  - Justice League/Planetary (2002)
    - Planetary/JLA: Terra Occulta (2002): Batman recruits Superman and Wonder Woman to help him uncover the secrets of the Planetary organization.
  - Batman/Planetary (2003)
    - Planetary/Batman: Night on Earth (2003): In their efforts to find a man known as John Black the Planetary team end up coming into conflict with Batmen from across the Multiverse.
- The Wild Storm
  - The Wild Storm: Michael Cray
- Waller vs. WildStorm

==== Marvel Comics ====
- Godzilla crossovers (Toho)
- Ultraman crossovers (Tsuburaya Productions)
  - Ultraman x Avengers
  - Ultraman: Along Came a Spider-Man
- Fortnite crossovers (Epic Games)
  - Fortnite X Marvel
    - Fortnite X Marvel: Zero War

=== Image Comics ===
- Altered Image
- Deathmate is a six-part comic book crossover series between Valiant Comics and Image Comics published in 1993–94.
- Shattered Image
- Image United
- Crossover

=== Dynamite Entertainment ===
- Kings Watch
- Gold Key: Alliance
- The Sovereigns
- DIEnamite!

=== IDW Publishing ===
- Transformers/Back to the Future
- Transformers/Ghostbusters
- New Avengers/Transformers
- Teenage Mutant Ninja Turtles x Naruto
- Sonic the Hedgehog X Godzilla

=== Other ===
- Batman/Teenage Mutant Ninja Turtles (DC and IDW Publishing)
  - Batman/Teenage Mutant Ninja Turtles II
  - Batman/Teenage Mutant Ninja Turtles Adventures
  - Batman/Teenage Mutant Ninja Turtles III
- Justice League/Mighty Morphin Power Rangers (DC and Boom! Studios)
- Mighty Morphin Power Rangers/Teenage Mutant Ninja Turtles (Boom! and IDW)
  - Mighty Morphin Power Rangers/Teenage Mutant Ninja Turtles II
  - Mighty Morphin Power Rangers/Teenage Mutant Ninja Turtles III
- Transformers vs. the Terminator (IDW and Dark Horse Comics)
- Robotech/Voltron

== See also ==
- List of DC Comics intercompany crossovers
- List of Marvel Comics intercompany crossovers
