= Superman vs. The Amazing Spider-Man: The Battle of the Century =

1976 American crossover comic book

- Superman vs The Amazing Spider-Man (1976), cover art by Carmine Infantino (layout), Ross Andru (finishes and pencils), and Dick Giordano (inks).

Publication information
- Publisher: DC Comics/Marvel Comics
- Genre: Superhero
- Publication date: January 2nd, 1976
- Main character(s): Superman; Spider-Man; Lex Luthor; Doctor Octopus

Creative team
- Written by: Gerry Conway
- Penciller(s): Ross Andru; Neal Adams (uncredited, redrawing of major Superman figures); John Romita Sr. (uncredited, some Marvel faces)
- Inker(s): Dick Giordano; Terry Austin (uncredited, backgrounds); Bob Wiacek (uncredited, backgrounds of three pages)

Superman vs The Amazing Spider-Man: The Battle of the Century is a comic book jointly published by Marvel Comics and DC Comics in March 1976. It was the second co-publishing effort between DC Comics and Marvel Comics following their collaboration on MGM's Marvelous Wizard of Oz, and the first modern superhero intercompany crossover. It is the first crossover between Superman and Spider-Man.

In the story, Superman and Spider-Man must stop a world domination/destruction plot hatched in tandem by their respective arch-nemeses, Lex Luthor and Doctor Octopus. The issue is non-canonical, as it assumes that the heroes exist in the same universe with no explanation given as to why they had never before met or been mentioned in each other's individual stories.

Superman and Spider-Man, a sequel to this story, was published in July 1981. A third and fourth crossover were announced in 2025. The third, Superman/Spider-Man was published by DC on March 26, 2026. The fourth, Spider-Man/Superman, was published by Marvel in April 2026.

== Publication history ==
In the early 1970s, author and literary agent David Obst suggested to Marvel Comics publisher Stan Lee and DC Comics editorial director Carmine Infantino that there should be a feature film crossover featuring Marvel's Spider-Man and DC's Superman characters. However, there was already a Superman movie planned by Warner Bros., and a series of Spider-Man TV movies. Instead, the two companies settled for an oversize comic book entitled Superman vs the Amazing Spider-Man: The Battle of the Century. The comic was published in 1976 and featured the two title characters, as well as their girlfriends (Mary Jane Watson and Lois Lane), their bosses (J. Jonah Jameson and Morgan Edge) and their primary adversaries (Doctor Octopus and Lex Luthor). It was the second time the two U.S. comic book giants published a joint venture, the first being 1975's MGM's Marvelous Wizard of Oz.

The writing was done by Gerry Conway and the penciling by Ross Andru. Both of these creators had worked on Superman and Spider-Man before in their own titles. In a 2006 interview, Conway laughed: "For my money, there was no rational way we were going to justify this team-up. I mean, in what universe, on what world [did it take place]?... I looked at it as a chance to do a story for the fans, a fun story. It was a chance to do the scenes I [as a fan] would like to see in this fantasy". The interviewer quips that "some fans have said it took place on "Earth-$"".

The original edition lists no editor, with the splash reading: "Presented by: Carmine Infantino and Stan Lee"; this was changed to "Edited by" in a 1991 reprint. Conway in 2009 said he "did the actual editorial work" (meaning "proofing, supervision of production, supervision of art and lettering and coloring"). Neal Adams redrew the major Superman figures. Inker Dick Giordano recalled: "[T]he pages were sent to [Giordano and Adams' studio] Continuity and were mostly left on my desk... and Neal took it upon himself to redraw the Superman figures without telling me that he was going to do it. I didn't complain, but I also never mentioned it to anyone at the time and I never spoke of it until now... mostly out of respect for Ross and his work".

John Romita Sr. drew some Marvel character faces and did some Spider-Man alterations in chapter two. Giordano's assistant, Terry Austin, inked backgrounds, except for three pages of the five-page "Prologue 3", on which Bob Wiacek inked backgrounds.

== Plot summary ==
Superman rescues Metropolis from a giant-robot attack by his old foe Lex Luthor, who manages to send some sort of stolen device to one of his strongholds for safekeeping. Elsewhere (in New York), Spider-Man battles and defeats his longtime foe Doctor Octopus and his henchmen. Sent to a federal "super-security" prison (designed for the incarceration of super-villains), Luthor and Doctor Octopus agree to combine forces in order to conquer the world and kill both of the men who put them behind bars. In a matter of minutes, combining their abilities, the two super-villains escape.

Newspaper photographer Peter Parker (Spider-Man's alter ego) and Mary Jane Watson attend a press conference in New York City that features a new satellite, ComSat, capable of disrupting global weather patterns. Journalists Clark Kent (Superman's alter ego) and Lois Lane also attend, arriving by plane from Metropolis. When Lois climbs onto a catwalk to get a better view of the satellite, she slips and falls. Peter saves Lois' life and introduces her to Mary Jane. Mary Jane gets a little jealous of Lois Lane, who reassures her that she is not interested in (the much younger) Peter Parker. Then, Lex Luthor, disguised as Superman, swoops in and shoots a teleportation ray out of his Superman mask, teleporting Lois and Mary Jane to an unknown destination. Luthor flies away, and both Peter and Clark soon follow him and change into their respective costumes.

Operating on the widespread public belief Spider-Man is an outlaw, Superman mistakenly blames him for the disappearance of the two women. The two begin to fight, but dodge each other's punches. Superman flies away at super-speed, evading Spider-Man's next attack, while trying to analyze the situation. Still hidden, Luthor fires a ray gun at Spider-Man, irradiating the heroes with light similar to that emitted by a red sun. The red-sun radiation degrades Superman's powers and enhances Spider-Man's, allowing Spider-Man to land several punches staggering Superman until the effects of the radiation dissipates.

When his punches, previously knocking Superman off balance, suddenly have little effect and he realizes he is doing little besides bruising his own fists, Spider-Man calls off the fight. Realizing they have been deceived, Superman, suspecting a plot by Luthor and Doc Ock, proposes they amicably join forces to solve the mystery and rescue the women.

Moving to Africa, Spider-Man and Superman battle Doctor Octopus, Lex Luthor, and a native African warrior endowed by Luthor with super-strength and endurance and a red-sun irradiated sword. Spider-Man and Superman defeat the warrior only by combining their powers and enlisting help from some native tribesmen. Spider-Man steals an Injustice Gang spaceship from Luthor's base in Africa and heads into outer space with Superman to confront Doctor Octopus and Luthor. The supervillains have used the Injustice Gang's Satellite Headquarters' computers in conjunction with the device stolen by Luthor to agitate the Earth's atmosphere with a combination of sonic waves and lasers, causing huge tornadoes and hurricanes worldwide. Superman is felled by the beam's high-pitched sonics and Spider-Man loses consciousness when the spaceship's oxygen is compromised.

The heroes awaken aboard the Injustice Gang Satellite, where Mary Jane and Lois are held captive. Superman defeats Doctor Octopus by tearing off two of his robotic arms and shattering his eyeglasses, while Spider-Man uses psychology to try to divide the villains. Doctor Octopus realizes that Luthor's scheme, if allowed to succeed, will effectively destroy human civilization, leaving them with "nothing to rule" even if they prevail. He uses one of his robotic arms to destroy the weather machine's control console, stopping the potential disaster.

An enraged Luthor attacks and defeats Doctor Octopus. While Superman returns to Earth to stop a gigantic tidal wave from destroying most of the East Coast of the United States, Spider-Man defeats Luthor. Superman returns to the satellite, where Spider-Man has bound the two villains with his webs. Congratulating themselves on a job well done, Superman and Spider-Man take the villains into custody. In an epilogue, Clark and Lois go on a double date with Peter and Mary Jane.

A minor subplot of the story involves a barroom meeting between Daily Planet publisher and WGBS network chief Morgan Edge and Daily Bugle editor J. Jonah Jameson, in which the two irascible boss figures compare complaints about their employees Kent and Parker, and their respective propensities to suddenly disappear in the midst of crisis situations. Briefly they toy with the idea of exchanging the two, but decide the plan is impractical.

== See also ==
- The Uncanny X-Men and The New Teen Titans (1982) – A one-shot intercompany crossover, features the two companies' teams of superheroes, Marvel's X-Men, and DC's New Teen Titans. In the story, the X-Men and the New Teen Titans team-up against the New God Darkseid, aided by Metron, attempting to harness the power of the Phoenix Force.
- DC vs. Marvel (February to May 1996) – A four issue intercompany crossover miniseries, which pitted Marvel Comics superheroes against their DC Comics counterparts in battle. The outcome of each battle was determined by reader ballot, which were distributed in advance to comic book stores.
  - Amalgam Comics: a collaborative publishing imprint shared by DC and Marvel, in which the two comic book publishers merged their characters into new ones.
- JLA/Avengers (September 2003 to March 2004) – A four issue intercompany crossover miniseries, features the two companies' teams of superheroes, DC Comics' Justice League of America and Marvel's Avengers. The crossover is officially canon for both companies and the cosmic egg has appeared in DC's Trinity and in Marvel's Official Handbook of the Marvel Universe.
- Deadpool/Batman and Batman/Deadpool (2025) – Two one-shot intercompany crossovers, featuring Deadpool and Batman teaming up against the Joker and Cassandra Nova respectively.
