= The Uncanny X-Men and The New Teen Titans =

Comic book published by Marvel Comics

Marvel and DC Present The Uncanny X-Men and The New Teen Titans
- Front cover art for The Uncanny X-Men and The New Teen Titans. Art by Walt Simonson and Terry Austin.

Publication information
- Publisher: DC Comics; Marvel Comics
- Format: Prestige format
- Publication date: 1982
- No. of issues: 1
- Main character(s): X-Men; New Teen Titans; Darkseid; Dark Phoenix; Deathstroke

Creative team
- Written by: Chris Claremont
- Penciller: Walt Simonson
- Inker: Terry Austin
- Letterer: Tom Orzechowski
- Colorist: Glynis Wein
- Editor(s): Louise Jones; Len Wein

The Uncanny X-Men and The New Teen Titans is a 1982 crossover comic book published by Marvel Comics. It was written by Chris Claremont and pencilled by Walt Simonson. It follows a team-up between two teams of superheroes: Marvel's the X-Men, and the New Teen Titans of rival publisher DC Comics.

== Publication history ==
In 1982, Uncanny X-Men and The New Teen Titans shared several similarities. In addition to high popularity and strong sales, both titles were helmed by respected, established writers, in Chris Claremont (X-Men) and Marv Wolfman (Teen Titans). Given the success of each title, Marvel and DC recognized the sales potential of a jointly published crossover, with X-Men writer Chris Claremont scripting the story and Walt Simonson and Terry Austin providing the art. The comic was lettered by X-Men letterer Tom Orzechowski and edited by X-Men's Louise Jones. Len Wein, the editor of The New Teen Titans, acted as DC's liaison with Marvel on the project.

== Plot ==
Seeking to co-opt the near-limitless power of the Source, the alien tyrant Darkseid continues his efforts to break through the Source Wall. Thinking that the energy associated with the Phoenix Force can help him penetrate the mysteries of the Source, Darkseid sets into motion a plan to recreate the Dark Phoenix by tapping into the memories of her former teammates, the X-Men, as well as drawing the residue of her power from a variety of sources, and then amplifying that residue, using energy streaming from the rupture of the Source Wall. With his help, Metron had pierced the Wall and his sacrifice effected a small rupture which bled a steady stream of energy. Both superhero teams are alerted to the dangers by the Titans' Starfire, who has knowledge of Dark Phoenix's immense destructive power.

Despite their best efforts, each team is defeated and captured by Deathstroke and Darkseid's shock troops. Darkseid brings the Dark Phoenix back to life. Both super-teams work together, freeing themselves and defeating their enemies in a climactic battle. Colossus prevents the gathering of psionic residue at a western mesa and this results in the Dark Phoenix simulation being flawed, and exploiting said flaw enables the two teams to drive a wedge between Dark Phoenix and Darkseid. Professor X and Cyclops convince what is left of Jean Grey's human consciousness that she is being manipulated. Once again, Jean Grey sacrifices herself to defeat Darkseid; in doing so, all damage is repaired. What had been Darkseid is now part of the Source Wall, and Metron returns home, whatever he sought having been attained.

== Critical response ==
The Slings and Arrows Comic Guide wrote that "Claremont courageously defies tradition by filling an unbalanced basket of guest stars, and Walt Simonson's first-rate pencils contribute to the finest Marvel/DC co-production." Comics historian Matthew K. Manning calls it "one of the most well-received crossovers of its time — or of any time for that matter." In 2018, Nerdist's Eric Diaz called the comic "still the greatest event comic ever."

== Aborted sequel ==
Despite the success of the project, The Uncanny X-Men and The New Teen Titans represented the last new DC–Marvel intercompany crossover for over a decade. A planned "X-Men/Teen Titans" #2, by the Titans creative team of Marv Wolfman and George Pérez, was scheduled for publication near Christmas 1983. X-Men writer Claremont had shared details of future X-Men storylines with Wolfman to facilitate Wolfman's writing of the script. Pérez was slated to draw the much-anticipated JLA/Avengers intercompany crossover due for publication in 1984, which was eventually scuttled due to editorial squabbling between the two companies. Continuing disagreements between Marvel and DC and Pérez's anger over the demise of the JLA/Avengers book resulted in the eventual cancellation of X-Men/Teen Titans #2 as well. Unlike the JLA/Avengers, a good portion of which had already been drawn by Pérez, no artwork was ever drawn for the Uncanny X-Men and The New Teen Titans sequel. It was not until 1994's Batman/Punisher: Lake of Fire that DC and Marvel joined forces again in a new publishing venture.

== See also ==
- Superman vs. The Amazing Spider-Man: The Battle of the Century (March 1976) – The first modern superhero intercompany crossover. In the story, Superman and Spider-Man must stop a world domination/destruction plot hatched in tandem by their respective arch-nemeses, Lex Luthor and Doctor Octopus.
  - Its sequel Superman and Spider-Man (1981), which also pits Superman against the Hulk and Spider-Man against Wonder Woman.
- DC vs. Marvel (February to May 1996) – A four issue intercompany crossover miniseries, which pitted Marvel Comics superheroes against their DC Comics counterparts in battle. The outcome of each battle was determined by reader ballot, which were distributed in advance to comic book stores.
  - Amalgam Comics: a collaborative publishing imprint shared by DC and Marvel, in which the two comic book publishers merged their characters into new ones.
- JLA/Avengers (September 2003 to March 2004) – A four issue intercompany crossover miniseries, features the two companies' teams of superheroes, DC Comics' Justice League of America and Marvel's Avengers. The crossover is officially canon for both companies; the cosmic egg introduced in JLA/Avengers has appeared in DC's Trinity and in Marvel's Official Handbook of the Marvel Universe.
- Deadpool/Batman and Batman/Deadpool (2025) – Two one-shot intercompany crossovers, featuring Deadpool and Batman teaming up against the Joker and Cassandra Nova respectively.
