= DC vs. Marvel =

Comic book miniseries crossover

- Cover of DC versus Marvel Comics #1, art by Dan Jurgens

Publication information
- Publisher: DC Comics; Marvel Comics
- Format: Limited series
- Publication date: February – May 1996
- No. of issues: 4
- Main characters: Access; Spectre; Living Tribunal; DC Universe; Marvel Universe

Creative team
- Written by: Ron Marz; Peter David
- Pencillers: Dan Jurgens; Claudio Castellini

Collected editions
- DC versus Marvel Comics: ISBN 1-56389-294-4

DC vs. Marvel (issues #2–3 titled Marvel vs. DC) is a comic book miniseries intercompany crossover published by DC Comics and Marvel Comics from February to May 1996. Each company would publish two issues of the miniseries, thus the title difference between issues #1 and 4 as DC vs. Marvel Comics from DC and issues #2–3 from Marvel as Marvel Comics vs. DC. The miniseries was written by Ron Marz and Peter David, with art by Dan Jurgens and Claudio Castellini.

The special crossover miniseries pitted Marvel Comics superheroes against their DC counterparts in battle. The outcome of each battle was determined by reader ballot, which were distributed in advance to comic book stores.

An omnibus edition of DC vs. Marvel was released in October 2024.

== Plot ==
Two god-like brothers who personify the DC and Marvel Universes each become aware of the other's existence and challenge one another to a series of duels involving each universe's respective superheroes. The losing universe would cease to exist. The story had an "out of universe" component in that the outcomes of the primary battles were determined by the readers' votes.

Numerous smaller story-driven skirmishes occur throughout the miniseries, not counted with the primary duels meant to determine the outcome between the brothers.

There were 11 battles fought between the two universes.

The result of the following six battles were determined by the miniseries' creative team:

- Aquaman (DC) vs. Namor the Sub-Mariner (Marvel). Aquaman won by summoning a whale to leap out of the water and land on top of Namor. Since Namor is pinned and unable to move, he is declared the loser.
- Elektra (Marvel) vs. Catwoman (DC). Elektra won by cutting off Catwoman's whip as she hung from a girder on a building under construction, but Catwoman survived by falling into a dumpster filled with sand.
- The Flash (DC) vs. Quicksilver (Marvel). The Flash won by using superior speed.
- Robin (DC) vs. Jubilee (Marvel). Robin won by using his cape as a decoy and then tying up Jubilee.
- The Silver Surfer (Marvel) vs. Green Lantern (DC). The Silver Surfer won when both collided with each other and released a huge explosion which knocked out Green Lantern, but left the Silver Surfer unfazed.
- Thor (Marvel) vs. Captain Marvel (DC). Thor won when Captain Marvel was forced to change back to his alter ego of Billy Batson. Billy tried to change back, but Thor used Mjolnir to intercept the lightning bolt that would have transformed him back into Captain Marvel; the resulting impact knocked Billy out and sent Thor's hammer flying off into the distance.

The result of the following five battles were determined by the readers' votes:

- Superman (DC) vs. the Hulk (Marvel). After exchanging punches and a burst of heat vision, Superman defeated the Hulk.
- Spider-Man (Marvel) vs. Superboy (DC). With the advantage of his spider-sense, Spider-Man won by tying up Superboy with impact webbing and electrocuting him with high voltage, knocking him out.
- Batman (DC) vs. Captain America (Marvel). The match ultimately ends in Batman's victory, though both are evenly matched after hours of combat, until a sudden flushing of the sewer knocks Captain America off balance as Batman manages to strike him with a batarang. Batman rescues Captain America from certain death by drowning, but Captain America's unconsciousness from nearly drowning causes him to lose.
- Wolverine (Marvel) vs. Lobo (DC). Wolverine beats up Lobo in a brutal barfight, which was largely off-panel.
- Storm (Marvel) vs. Wonder Woman (DC). After Wonder Woman drops Thor's hammer in order to allow the fight to happen as it was intended to, Storm won the battle after repeatedly hitting Wonder Woman with lightning after a brief melee encounter.

Although the final victor of the battles is Marvel, the new character of Access, a man capable of traversing between the two universes, infuses Batman and Captain America each with fragments of their respective universes before the Spectre and the Living Tribunal attempt to create a compromise by fusing the two universes together. This resulted in the creation of the Amalgam Universe, which sees various amalgamated versions of the heroes and villains acting as though they have been in existence for years.

Access is eventually able to find the Dark Claw and Super-Soldier – versions of Batman and Captain America who have been amalgamated with Wolverine and Superman, respectively – and use the fragments of the two original universes in them to restore them to normal. As the Brothers engage in direct battle, the Spectre and the Living Tribunal attempt to stop the conflict, but Batman and Captain America convince Access to take them to the conflict as well. Reading the minds of Batman and Captain America as they try to stop the fight, the Brothers realize that the two men are essentially the Brothers in miniature; each one unique among their worlds, but with no interest in the conflict that the Brothers have engaged in. Realizing the pointlessness of the conflict, the Brothers withdraw and congratulate each other.

== Trading cards ==
To promote the event, SkyBox released a series of trading cards. The cards expanded the number of fights in comparison to the miniseries, including battles between villains, and were praised for their artwork, which was thought to be of a high standard.

The DC versus Marvel Comics trading card set contained 100 base cards, with base card #100 being a checklist. The remaining 99 base cards were divided into four types: Hero, Villain, Rival and Battles. There were also four subsets of chase cards: 18 Impact cards, 12 Holo F/X cards, two Mirage cards and four Amalgam Preview cards.

== Collected editions ==
After its completion, the miniseries was collected into a trade paperback titled DC versus Marvel Comics (collects the miniseries and Doctor Strangefate #1; 192 pages; September 1996; ISBN 1-56389-294-4).

The miniseries was collected with the other past DC/Marvel crossovers in an omnibus edition titled DC versus Marvel Omnibus in 2024.

== See also ==
- Amalgam Comics
- List of Amalgam Comics characters
- List of Amalgam Comics publications
- Superman vs. The Amazing Spider-Man: The Battle of the Century (March 1976) – The first modern superhero intercompany crossover. In the story, Superman and Spider-Man must stop a world domination/destruction plot hatched in tandem by their respective arch-nemeses, Lex Luthor and Doctor Octopus.
  - Its sequel Superman and Spider-Man (1981) also pits Superman against the Hulk and Spider-Man against Wonder Woman.
- The Uncanny X-Men and The New Teen Titans (1982) – A one-shot intercompany crossover, features the two companies' teams of superheroes, Marvel's X-Men, and DC's New Teen Titans. In the story, the X-Men and the New Teen Titans team-up against the New God Darkseid, aided by Metron, attempting to harness the power of the Phoenix Force.
- JLA/Avengers (September 2003 to March 2004) – A four issue intercompany crossover miniseries, features the two companies' teams of superheroes, DC Comics' Justice League of America and Marvel's Avengers. The crossover is officially canon for both companies; the cosmic egg introduced in JLA/Avengers has appeared in DC's Trinity and in Marvel's Official Handbook of the Marvel Universe.
- Deadpool/Batman and Batman/Deadpool (2025) – Two one-shot intercompany crossovers, featuring Deadpool and Batman teaming up against the Joker and Cassandra Nova respectively.
