= List of Amalgam Comics publications =

Near the end of the DC vs. Marvel crossover in 1996, Amalgam Comics released a series of one-shot comic book issues combining characters from the DC Universe with characters from the Marvel Universe. The first 12 Amalgam titles were released in a single week, temporarily replacing both publishers' regular releases. Half the comics in the event were published by DC Comics and half by Marvel Comics. In 1997 the event was repeated, but without the crossover event as a background. Later, both publishers collected all of their one-shots into four trade paperbacks. All 24 of the one-shots occurred between Marvel Comics vs. DC #3 and DC vs. Marvel Comics #4, the last two issues of the crossover event.

Nineteen of the 24 Amalgam Comics one-shots that were printed included phony letter columns with letters written by fictitious fans to give a larger background to the stories and to help give hints of what might happen in the next issue. The fans' hometowns were usually amalgamations of existing American cities.

== April 1996 – DC Comics ==
=== Amazon #1 ===
Amazon #1, written and drawn by John Byrne, featured Amazon a.k.a. Princess Ororo Munroe of Themiscyra. Amazon returned in another title in the 1997 Amalgam Comics event titled JLX Unleashed #1.

=== Assassins #1 ===
Assassins #1, written by Dan Chichester and illustrated by Scott McDaniel, featured two main characters, Catsai and Dare the Terminator. Despite their enmity, they team up to take on the Big Question and his gang.

=== Doctor Strangefate #1 ===
Doctor Strangefate #1 was written by Ron Marz with art by José Luis García-López and Kevin Nowlan. The issue features the powerful sorcerer Doctor Strangefate. His comic also featured the character Access and highlights his adventures in between issues #3 and 4 of the miniseries DC vs. Marvel. This book was reprinted in the DC versus Marvel Comics trade paperback due to its part in the overall story.

=== JLX #1 ===
JLX #1 was written by Gerard Jones and Mark Waid, with art by Howard Porter and John Dell. The members of the Judgment League Avengers (JLA) whose powers are metamutant in origin turn against their teammates and form their own team, the Justice League X-Men (JLX). They leave in order to find Atlantis. The JLX returned in another title in the 1997 Amalgam Comics event titled JLX Unleashed #1.

=== Legends of the Dark Claw #1 ===
Legends of the Dark Claw #1 was written by Larry Hama with art by Jim Balent and Ray McCarthy. The Dark Claw also appeared in JLX #1 as a member of the JLA and returned in another title in the 1997 Amalgam Comics event titled Dark Claw Adventures #1.

=== Super-Soldier #1 ===
Super-Soldier, cover artwork from Super-Soldier: Man of War #1 (June 1997)

Super-Soldier #1 was written by Mark Waid and illustrated by Dave Gibbons.

An experimental infusion of alien DNA transforms the human Clark Kent into Super-Soldier, hero of World War II. After being sent into suspended animation, he is revived in modern times. He fought against the Green Skull (alias Lex Luthor), the doomsday robot Ultra-Metallo and the terrorist organization HYDRA.

Super-Soldier also appeared in JLX #1 as the leader of the JLA, and returned in two other titles in the 1997 Amalgam Comics event titled Super-Soldier: Man of War #1 and JLX Unleashed #1 (the latter again as the leader of the JLA).

== April 1996 – Marvel Comics ==
=== Bruce Wayne: Agent of S.H.I.E.L.D. #1 ===
Bruce Wayne: Agent of S.H.I.E.L.D. #1 was written by Chuck Dixon with art by Cary Nord and Mark Pennington. The character featured here returned in another title in the 1997 Amalgam Comics event titled JLX Unleashed #1.

=== Bullets and Bracelets #1 ===
Bullets and Bracelets #1 was written by John Ostrander and illustrated by Gary Frank.

=== Magneto and the Magnetic Men #1 ===
Magneto and the Magnetic Men #1 was written by Gerard Jones with art by Jeff Matsuda and Art Thibert. The team featured here returned in another title in the 1997 Amalgam Comics event titled The Magnetic Men featuring Magneto #1.

=== Speed Demon #1 ===
Speed Demon #1 was written by Howard Mackie and James Felder with art by Salvador Larroca and Al Milgrom.

=== Spider-Boy #1 ===
Spider-Boy #1 was written by Karl Kesel with art by Mike Wieringo and Gary Martin. Spider-Boy, the titular character, is a clone whose gravity powers enable him to mimic the wall-crawling abilities of a spider. The character featured here returned in another title in the 1997 Amalgam Comics event titled Spider-Boy Team-Up #1. Spider-Boy is an amalgamation of the characters Spider-Man and Superboy.

=== X-Patrol #1 ===
The team featured here returned in another title in the 1997 Amalgam Comics event titled The Exciting X-Patrol #1.

== June 1997 – DC Comics ==
=== Bat-Thing #1 ===
Bat-Thing #1 was written by Larry Hama with art by Rodolfo Damaggio and Bill Sienkiewicz. The Bat-Thing attacked people in the streets of New Gotham City, and Detective Clark Bullock tried to protect the Bat-Thing's wife and daughter from the monster.

=== Dark Claw Adventures #1 ===
Dark Claw Adventures #1 was written illustrated by Ty Templeton and Rick Burchett. This "animated series" version of the Dark Claw comic used an art style that mirrored Batman: The Animated Series and was similar to the comic book The Batman Adventures. Lady Talia pursued the Dark Claw to avenge the death of her father, Ra's a-Pocalypse.

=== Generation Hex #1 ===
Generation Hex #1 was written by Peter Milligan with art by Adam Pollina. The comic featured Generation Hex, a team of metamutants (here known as malforms) suffering from prejudice and living by robbery in the Old West. Their leader, Jono Hex, helps them escape the Scissormen, a trio of malform-hunting robots created by Sheriff "Bat" Trask and also gets revenge on his hometown of Humanity, who murdered his parents and younger sister when he was a boy.

=== JLX Unleashed #1 ===
JLX Unleashed #1 was written by Christopher Priest with art by Oscar Jimenez and Hanibal Rodriguez. This second outing of the JLX sees them joined by Amazon, a former member of the JLA. The Hellfire League of Injustice summons up the dragon Fin Fang Flame to destroy all metamutants. The dragon decides to incinerate the entirety of humanity, since, according to him, "All humanity, after all, is mutated to some extent". The JLA and the JLX team up to defeat it.

=== Lobo the Duck #1 ===
Lobo the Duck #1 was written by Alan Grant with art by Val Semeiks and Ray Kryssing.

The story revolves around the fearless, muscular and psychotic anti-hero/bounty hunter Lobo the Duck and his shapeshifting canine sidekick the Impossible Dawg who are investigating the murders of several Amalgam Comics superheroes, including Doctor Strangefate, the Skulk, Vikki Valkyrie and Hawkhawk.

Lobo agrees to find the murderer(s) only because the aforementioned heroes had paid him upfront. Lobo fights his way through Gold-Kidney Lady, Doctor Bongface, and various other supervillains before he realizes that the end of the world is about to begin and that only he can stop it.

Some other minor characters introduced in Lobo the Duck #1 include Ambush the Lunatik, a fellow bounty hunter that was eaten by Lobo after angering him; Al Forbush, the owner of Al Forbush's Subterranean Diner; and the brothers Jonas Turnip and Daryl Rutabaga.

=== Super-Soldier: Man of War #1 ===
Super-Soldier: Man of War #1 was written by Dave Gibbons and Mark Waid, with art by Dave Gibbons and Jimmy Palmiotti. This comic presented Super-Soldier (Clark Kent) in the style of the Golden Age World War II comics. Clark Kent and Jimmy Olsen are sent to England to follow a mysterious cargo of stolen equipment that is desired by the Nazis.

== June 1997 – Marvel Comics ==
Galactiac (an amalgamation of DC's Brainiac and Marvel's Galactus), interior artwork from Challengers of the Fantastic #1 (June 1997), art by Tom Grummett

=== Challengers of the Fantastic #1 ===
Challengers of the Fantastic #1 was written by Karl Kesel with art by Tom Grummett and Al Vey. The members of the team were scientist Reed "Prof" Richards, S.H.I.E.L.D. agent Susan "Ace" Storm, her daredevil brother Johnny "Red" Storm, and fighting Senator Ben "Rocky" Grimm. Their enemies included Doctor Doomsday and Galactiac.

=== The Exciting X-Patrol #1 ===
The Exciting X-Patrol #1 was written by Barbara Kesel with art by Bryan Hitch and Paul Neary. The team fought against Brother Brood. This comic was dedicated to the memory of Mark Gruenwald, who had died one year previously from a heart attack.

=== Iron Lantern #1 ===
Iron Lantern #1 was written by Kurt Busiek with art by Paul Smith. The comic is an amalgamation of the stories of Marvel's Iron Man and DC Comics' Silver Age Green Lantern. Inventor Hal Stark is testing a flight simulator when the machine is mysteriously pulled to the crash site of an alien spacecraft. Stark finds the corpse of its pilot, Green Lantern Rhomann Sur, and a Green Lantern power battery. His heart having been injured when the simulator also crashed, Stark builds a combination powered armor/life support system out of the battery, and dubs himself Iron Lantern. Stark faces such foes as Mandarinestro, H.E.C.T.O.R. (Highly Evolved Creature Totally Oriented for Revenge), and Madame Sapphire, the latter of whom is secretly Stark's lover Pepper Ferris.

=== The Magnetic Men featuring Magneto #1 ===
The Magnetic Men featuring Magneto #1 was written by Tom Peyer with art by Barry Kitson and Dan Panosian. In addition to the title characters, this comic book also features Mr. Mastermind and the Sinister Society.

The Sinister Society's members each represent various special metals from both universes. The members and their associated metals are:

- Kultron - adamantium
- Soniklaw - vibranium
- the Black Vulture - Nth metal
- Deathborg - promethium
- Vance Cosmic - inertron

=== Spider-Boy Team-Up #1 ===
Spider-Boy Team-Up #1 was written by "R. K. Sternsel" (an amalgamation of the names of Roger Stern and Karl Kesel) with art by José Ladrönn and Juan Vlasco. In this comic, Spider-Boy teams up with the Legion of Galactic Guardians 2099, characters based on the Marvel and DC comic books set in the far future and/or outer space.

=== Thorion of the New Asgods #1 ===
Thorion of the New Asgods #1 was written by Keith Giffen with art by John Romita Jr.

== See also ==
- Crossover (fiction)
- Intercompany crossovers in comics
- Amalgam Comics
- List of Amalgam Comics characters
- DC vs. Marvel
- JLA/Avengers
- "Infinity Wars", a Marvel Comics storyline where Marvel characters were amalgamated with other Marvel characters
