= JLA/Avengers =

Crossover published in prestige format by DC Comics and Marvel Comics

- Detail of the cover for JLA/Avengers #1 (Sept. 2003), art by George Pérez.

Publication information
- Publisher: DC Comics; Marvel Comics
- Schedule: Monthly
- Format: Limited series
- Publication date: September 2003 – March 2004
- No. of issues: JLA/Avengers #1, 3 (Sept. and Dec. 2003); Avengers/JLA #2, 4 (Oct. 2003 and March 2004)
- Main character(s): Avengers; Justice League; Grandmaster; Metron; Krona

Creative team
- Written by: Kurt Busiek
- Artist: George Pérez

JLA/Avengers (issues #2 and 4 are titled Avengers/JLA) is a comic book limited series and crossover published in prestige format by DC Comics and Marvel Comics from September 2003 to March 2004. The series was written by Kurt Busiek, with art by George Pérez. The series features the two companies' teams of superheroes, DC Comics' Justice League of America and Marvel's Avengers.

== Publication history ==
In 1979, DC and Marvel agreed to co-publish a crossover series involving the two teams, to be written by Gerry Conway and drawn by George Pérez. The plot of the original crossover was a time travel story involving Marvel's Kang the Conqueror and DC's Epoch. Writer/editor Roy Thomas was hired to script the book based on Conway's plot, and although work had begun on the series in 1981 (Pérez had penciled 21 pages by mid-1983) and it was scheduled for publication in May 1983, editorial disputes – reportedly instigated by then-Marvel editor-in-chief Jim Shooter – prevented the story from being completed. The failure of the JLA/Avengers book's publication also caused the cancellation of a planned sequel to the 1982 crossover issue The Uncanny X-Men and The New Teen Titans.

An agreement was reached between the two companies in 2002, with a new story to be written by Kurt Busiek and drawn by George Pérez. In a joint panel at WonderCon 2000, Busiek (then writer of the Avengers title) and Mark Waid (the then-writer of the JLA title) stated they had nearly come to an agreement to begin the crossover within the regular issues of the respective titles, but the two companies could not come to a business arrangement. When the series was approved, however, Waid was unavailable due to an exclusive commitment with the company CrossGen, and Busiek became the sole writer on the project. Pérez also had an exclusive commitment with CrossGen, but had a clause written into his contract allowing him to do the series if it was approved.

JLA/Avengers is officially canon for both companies and the cosmic egg has appeared in DC's Trinity and in Marvel's Official Handbook of the Marvel Universe. The series was reprinted by DC Comics in 2004 as a two-volume collector's edition hardcover (which included for the first time the original 21 Pérez-penciled pages from mid-1983), and then re-released as a trade paperback in November 2008. The trade paperback was reprinted in 2022, with 64 pages of extra content, to honor Pérez who had been diagnosed with terminal cancer and raise money for The Hero Initiative, a charity Pérez had been involved with for much of his adult life.

== Plot ==
Krona, an exiled Oan, travels across the multiverse and destroys universes seeking the truth of creation. When he arrives in the Marvel Universe, the Grandmaster — wanting to save his universe — proposes that they play a game. If Krona wins, the Grandmaster will lead him to Galactus, a being in that universe who has witnessed creation. If he loses, Krona has to spare the Grandmaster's universe. Before choosing the players to participate in this game, Krona demands to swap champions, so the Avengers (the Grandmaster's longtime adversaries) will represent Krona and the Justice League (from Krona's home universe) will fight for the Grandmaster.

The Grandmaster informs the Justice League that to save their universe, they have to gather 12 items of power — six from each universe — while his ally Metron tells the Avengers that they have to do the same to prevent their world from being destroyed. The six items from the DC Universe are the Spear of Destiny, the Book of Eternity, the Orb of Ra, the Medusa Mask, the Bell, Jar and Wheel of the Demons Three, and the Green Lantern Power Battery of Kyle Rayner. The six items from the Marvel Universe are the Ultimate Nullifier, the Evil Eye of Avalon, the Wand of Watoomb, the Casket of Ancient Winters, the Cosmic Cube, and the Infinity Gauntlet.

The Justice League travels to the Marvel Universe and are shocked (especially Superman) by the Avengers' failure to improve their Earth's condition; for example, the Flash (Wally West) encounters a non-human-looking mutant running from an anti-mutant mob and protects him. Convinced that the Flash is a member of Magneto's Acolytes, the mob attacks him as well. The Flash also discovers that the Speed Force (the source of his powers) does not exist in the Marvel universe. When the Avengers visit the DC Universe, they are surprised by the "futuristic" architecture of its Earth's cities and the honors that the Justice League and other native heroes receive for their deeds. As a result, they (mainly Captain America) become convinced that the Justice League are fascists who demand that civilians hero-worship them.

Various Justice League and Avengers members travel across the two universes and fight each other to retrieve the artifacts of power. A final battle for the Cosmic Cube takes place in the Marvel Universe's Savage Land. After a climactic back-and-forth battle, Quicksilver claims the Cosmic Cube. At that moment, Krona and the Grandmaster arrive on the scene, with the latter observing and commenting that the score is even at 6–6. Batman and Captain America — who together investigated the cause of the contest and discovered its true nature and stakes — arrive. Captain America purposely throws his shield and knocks the Cube from Quicksilver's hands, allowing Batman to catch it. With Captain America's forfeiture of the Cosmic Cube, the Grandmaster announces the Justice League as the victors, with the final score being 7–5. Krona is unwilling to accept defeat, and attacks the Grandmaster, forcing the identity of Galactus from him. He then summons Galactus and tries to extract information about the origin of the universe. The Grandmaster uses the power of the artifacts and merges both universes together before Krona can tear Galactus apart.

Reality is altered such that the Justice League and the Avengers are now longtime allies, regularly traveling between worlds to fight various threats. In addition, long-dead JLA members the Flash (Barry Allen) and Green Lantern (Hal Jordan) have reappeared. The universes, however, are incompatible with one another and begin destroying themselves and each other, with people switching between worlds. One side effect of this is that Superman and Captain America become paranoid, irritable, and short-tempered; their emotions flare to the point where they blame each other for everything that is happening. The appearance of a spectral Krona helps the heroes remember some of the contest and they find out what is happening to their worlds. The Phantom Stranger appears to lead the heroes to the Grandmaster.

Weakened by Krona's attack, the Grandmaster explains how he brought the universes together to imprison Krona using the 12 items, but Krona is merging the universes further to destroy them, hoping to create a new Big Bang, which he can survive and finally learn its mysteries. Before dying, the Grandmaster asks the assembled heroes to stop Krona and restore order. At Captain America's insistence, he reveals various events that had taken place in the separate universes to show the heroes what sorts of worlds they are fighting for. Each team member witnesses the tragedies that had befallen them in their separate universes, such as the death of Barry Allen in Crisis on Infinite Earths, Hal Jordan's descent into evil in Emerald Twilight, and the loss of the Vision and the Scarlet Witch's children. Some of the heroes contemplate leaving the universes as they are to prevent the tragedies from happening, but Hal Jordan inspires everyone to work for the good of their worlds.

Krona has trapped the universal avatars of Eternity and Kismet as reality continues to change. He has discovered that a sentience exists in universes and intends to force their spirits out, giving him their secrets. Both teams of heroes reconcile their differences with one another and make plans to stop Krona. Invading Krona's inter-dimensional base, Captain America leads every hero who has been a member of the Justice League or the Avengers. Chronal chaos at the base causes an ever-shifting roster of heroes to confront every villain whom the teams have ever fought with the villains having been mentally enthralled by Krona. Even though the chaos and the sheer forces against them (both from Krona and the summoned villains) cause the heroes to fall one by one along the way, Krona is ultimately defeated when the Flash distracts him long enough for Hawkeye to shoot an explosive arrow into the machine he used to keep both worlds merged, after which the Flash takes the items of power — both heroes having been earlier presumed dead in battle. Krona is then sucked into the forming vortex.

The Earths are separated with help from the Spectre (who at the time was Hal Jordan) and the universes are returned to their normal states. As the heroes from both universes return to their proper places, they affirm that whether they do too little or too much, they are still heroes who will always fight the good fight. Krona has imploded to form a cosmic egg, which is stored in the Justice League Watchtower; Metron states that when the egg hatches, Krona will learn the secrets of its universe's creation by being part of it. Metron and the newly resurrected Grandmaster discuss how Metron intentionally lured Krona to the Marvel Universe. The Grandmaster says that this is the first game that he has ever played in which all sides won (the Grandmaster by way of the battle between the Justice Leaguers and Avengers, the heroes by saving their universes, and Krona by eventually gaining the answers that he sought).

== In other media ==
In 2009, Bruce Timm had expressed interest in an animated film based on the JLA/Avengers crossover limited series. No production updates have appeared since.

== See also ==
- Superman vs. The Amazing Spider-Man: The Battle of the Century (March 1976) – The first modern superhero intercompany crossover. In the story, Superman and Spider-Man must stop a world domination/destruction plot hatched in tandem by their respective arch-nemeses, Lex Luthor and Doctor Octopus.
  - Its sequel Superman and Spider-Man (1981) also pits Superman against the Hulk and Spider-Man against Wonder Woman.
- The Uncanny X-Men and The New Teen Titans (1982) – A one-shot intercompany crossover, features the two companies' teams of superheroes, Marvel's X-Men, and DC's New Teen Titans. In the story, the X-Men and the New Teen Titans team-up against the New God Darkseid, aided by Metron, attempting to harness the power of the Phoenix Force.
- DC vs. Marvel (February to May 1996) – A four issue intercompany crossover miniseries, which pitted Marvel Comics superheroes against their DC Comics counterparts in battle. The outcome of each battle was determined by reader ballot, which were distributed in advance to comic book stores.
  - Amalgam Comics: a collaborative publishing imprint shared by DC and Marvel, in which the two comic book publishers merged their characters into new ones.
- Deadpool/Batman and Batman/Deadpool (2025) – Two one-shot intercompany crossovers, featuring Deadpool and Batman teaming up against the Joker and Cassandra Nova respectively.
