= Deadpool/Batman and Batman/Deadpool =

Comic book miniseries crossover

Deadpool/Batman

Publication information
- Publisher: Marvel Comics
- Format: One-shot
- Genre: Superhero
- Publication date: September 17, 2025
- No. of issues: 1
- Main characters: Deadpool; Batman; Marvel Universe; DC Universe

Creative team
- Written by: Various
- Artist: Various

Batman/Deadpool

Publication information
- Publisher: DC Comics
- Format: One-shot
- Genre: Superhero
- Publication date: November 19, 2025
- No. of issues: 1
- Main characters: Batman; Deadpool; DC Universe; Marvel Universe

Creative team
- Written by: Various
- Artist: Various

Deadpool/Batman and Batman/Deadpool are two American comic book intercompany crossover anthology one-shot issues presented by veteran publishers Marvel Comics and DC Comics, debuting between September and November 2025. Both one-shots are non-canonical featuring Batman and Deadpool. Each company published one of the issues; Marvel Comics published Deadpool/Batman and DC Comics published Batman/Deadpool. It is the first crossover between the two companies since JLA/Avengers in 2004.

== Publication history ==
The new collaborative project between Marvel Comics and DC Comics was announced in 2025, with two one-shots featuring Deadpool and Batman, respectively. Deadpool/Batman is written by Zeb Wells, with art by Greg Capullo, and was published by Marvel on September 17, 2025. The one-shot features six anthology stories written by Marvel-veteran writers Chip Zdarsky, Kelly Thompson, Kevin Smith, Al Ewing, Frank Miller and Ryan North. The stories feature crossovers between Captain America and Wonder Woman, Jeff the Land Shark and Krypto, Daredevil and Green Arrow, Rocket Raccoon and Green Lantern, Old Man Logan and The Dark Knight Returns and the introduction of the new Amalgam Comics character, Logo.

Batman/Deadpool is written by Grant Morrison, with art by Dan Mora, and was published by DC on November 19, 2025. The one-shot has four anthology stories written by DC-veteran writers Scott Snyder with James Tynion IV and Joshua Williamson, Tom Taylor, Mariko Tamaki and G. Willow Wilson. The stories feature crossovers between John Constantine and Doctor Strange, Nightwing and Wolverine II, Harley Quinn and Hulk, and Static and Ms. Marvel.

=== Future crossovers ===
In October 2025, a second two–part intercompany crossover one-shots was announced by DC Comics and Marvel Comics, respectively. Superman/Spider-Man and Spider-Man/Superman will debut between March and April 2026.

== List of comics ==
=== Main issues ===
Titles	Featured characters	Creative team	Publication date	Ref.
Deadpool/Batman #1 (Marvel Comics)
"The Dead of Knight"	Deadpool created by Rob Liefeld and Fabian Nicieza; Batman created by Bill Finger and Bob Kane	Writer: Zeb Wells; Artist: Greg Capullo; Inker: Tim Townsend; Colorist: Alex Sinclair; Letterer: Clayton Cowles; Editor: Mark Basso	Sep 17, 2025	
"The Gun and the Sword"	Captain America created by Joe Simon and Jack Kirby; Wonder Woman created by William Moulton Marston	Writer: Chip Zdarsky; Artist/Colorist: Terry Dodson; Inker: Rachel Dodson; Letterer: Clayton Cowles; Editor: Wil Moss	Sep 17, 2025	
"Catch"	Jeff the Land Shark created by Kelly Thompson and Daniele di Nicuolo; Krypto created by Otto Binder, Curt Swan and Sy Barry	Writer: Kelly Thompson; Artist/Colorist/SFX: Gurihiru; Letterer: Joe Caramagna; Editor: Mark Basso	Sep 17, 2025	
"The Red and the Green"	Daredevil created by Stan Lee and Bill Everett; Green Arrow created by Mort Weisinger and George Papp	Writer: Kevin Smith; Artist: Adam Kubert; Colorist: Frank Martin; Letterer: Joe Caramagna; Editor: Darren Shan	Sep 17, 2025	
"Rocket Raccoon Has A Green Lantern Ring Now"	Rocket Raccoon created by Bill Mantlo and Keith Giffen; Green Lantern created by John Broome and Gil Kane	Writer: Al Ewing; Artist: Dike Ruan; Colorist: Moreno Dionisio; Letterer: Joe Caramagna; Editor: Darren Shan	Sep 17, 2025	
"Showdown"	Old Man Logan created by Mark Millar and Steve McNiven; The Dark Knight Returns created by Frank Miller and Klaus Janson	Writer/Artist: Frank Miller; Colorist: Alex Sinclair; Letterer: Joe Caramagna; Editor: Wil Moss	Sep 17, 2025	
"Enter Logo!"	Logo, an amalgamation of Wolverine and Lobo; Wolverine created by Len Wein and John Romita Sr.; Lobo created by Roger Slifer and Keith Giffen	Writer: Ryan North; Artist: Ryan Stegman; Colorist: Frank Martin; Letterer: Joe Caramagna; Editor: Mark Basso	Sep 17, 2025	
Batman/Deadpool #1 (DC Comics)
"The Cosmic Kiss Caper!"	Batman created by Bill Finger and Bob Kane; Deadpool created by Rob Liefeld and Fabian Nicieza	Writer: Grant Morrison; Artist: Dan Mora; Colorist: Alejandro Sánchez; Letterer: Todd Klein; Editor: Marie Javins with Andrew Marino	Nov 19, 2025	
"A Magician Walks Into a Universe"	John Constantine created by Alan Moore, Steve Bissette and John Totleben; Doctor Strange created by Steve Ditko	Writer: Scott Snyder with James Tynion IV & Joshua Williamson; Artist: Hayden Sherman; Colorist: Mike Spicer; Letterer: Adriano Lucas; Editor: Marie Javins	Nov 19, 2025	
"Sticks & Snikts"	Nightwing created by Bill Finger, Bob Kane and Jerry Robinson; Wolverine (Laura Kinney) created by Craig Kyle and Christopher Yost	Writer: Tom Taylor; Arist: Bruno Redondo; Colorist: Adriano Lucas; Letterer: Wes Abbott; Editor: Marie Javins	Nov 19, 2025	
"Harley & Hulk's Amazin' Saturday!!!!"	Harley Quinn created by Paul Dini and Bruce Timm; Hulk created by Stan Lee and Jack Kirby	Writer: Mariko Tamaki; Artist: Amanda Conner; Colorist: Tamra Bonvillain; Letterer: Dave Sharpe; Editor: Marie Javins	Nov 19, 2025	
"New Friends in Old Places"	Static created by Dwayne McDuffie, Denys Cowan, Christopher Priest, Michael Davis and Derek T. Dingle; Ms. Marvel created by Sana Amanat, Stephen Wacker, G. Willow Wilson, Adrian Alphona and Jamie McKelvie	Writer: G. Willow Wilson; Artist: Denys Cowan; Inker: Klaus Janson; Colorist: Francesco Segala; Letterer: Steve Wands; Editor: Marie Javins	Nov 19, 2025	

=== Digital issues ===
On November 12, 2025, two digital comic book one-shots were released, The Flash/Fantastic Four on DC Universe Infinite and Thor/Shazam on Marvel Unlimited.

- The Flash/Fantastic Four – written by Jeremy Adams and art by Adrián Gutiérrez; featuring The Flash and the Fantastic Four tearing "through the Speed Force, encountering heroes and villains across time in a bid to stop Gorilla Grodd's quest for mental domination".
- Thor/Shazam! – written by Al Ewing and art by Martín Cóccolo; featuring Thor and Shazam "in a lightning-charged adventure. When a mysterious foe threatens to steal the magic that fuels both universes, Donald Blake and Billy Batson must fight to reclaim their powers before it's too late".

== Deadpool/Batman (September 2025) ==
=== The Dead of Knight ===
In Gotham City, the Joker has been stealing chemicals to create a new version of Joker Venom, powerful enough to infect an entire country. He hires the anti-hero mercenary, Deadpool on a contract to kill Batman. Deadpool breaks into Wayne Manor and encounters Bruce Wayne. He begins soliciting Bruce for a mercenary job, but Bruce declines. Deadpool gets distracted when he sees the Bat-Signal in the sky and leaves. At the Gotham City Police Department, Deadpool meets with Jim Gordon at the Bat-Signal. Bruce, now as Batman, arrives and effortlessly fights and subdues Deadpool. Afterward, Deadpool offers to help Batman and Gordon locate the Joker's hideout, and Batman reluctantly forms a temporary partnership with him. While riding in the Batmobile, Deadpool double-crosses Batman and incapacitates him with knockout gas.

Batman wakes up tied up and finds himself a captive of both Joker and Deadpool, but he has already figured out a way to turn the tables. He begins to manipulate Joker by calling Deadpool a more impressive villain, "a villain worthy of the Bat." Driven into a jealous rage, Joker injects Deadpool with Joker Venom. Using the distraction, Batman frees himself from his restraints. Deadpool, laughing uncontrollably but still coherent, reveals to Batman that he was planning to double-cross Joker and untie him anyway. Joker then unveils his plan to release a deadly new strain of Joker Toxin across Gotham using a weaponized carousel. The only way to stop the toxin is to trigger a failsafe that will cause a massive explosion, one powerful enough to kill anyone who activates it. Due to his healing factor, Deadpool is able to activate the failsafe, destroying the carousel and surviving the explosion, ultimately saving Gotham from the Joker's toxin. Batman captures Joker. Despite Deadpool's earlier betrayal, Batman allows him to go free in recognition of his role in saving the city, but firmly tells him to leave Gotham. Deadpool agrees but decides to stick around in Gotham.

=== The Gun and the Sword ===
At the end of World War II, Captain America and Wonder Woman raided a Nazi facility. Deep inside, Wonder Woman walks in on Captain America just as he's about to shoot Adolf Hitler. Using her Lasso of Truth, Wonder Woman convinces Captain America to stay true to his values and not execute Hitler in cold blood. Captain America hesitates, then throws the gun away. Cowardly and desperate, Hitler grabs the discarded weapon and takes his own life. However, Hitler's death did not bring an immediate end to the war. In its final days, Captain America's best friend, Bucky Barnes, was killed, and Cap himself fell into the Atlantic Ocean, where he remained for decades, frozen in ice in a state of suspended animation.

Decades later, he was found in the ice and recovered by Wonder Woman, Superman and members of the Avengers (Iron Man, Thor and the Wasp). Over the years, Captain America and Wonder Woman would continue to team up, defending the world from threats such as the Coming of Galactus and the Multiversal Crisis. In a moment mirroring their past, Captain America later convinces Wonder Woman to stay true to her ideals and not execute Maxwell Lord in cold blood. In the future, during the Infinite Universes Crisis, Captain America is mortally wounded by Thanos. As he lies dying, Wonder Woman comforts him. With his final breaths, he holds onto the Lasso of Truth, reflecting that they had been saving each other all along. In honor of Captain America's memory, Wonder Woman takes up his shield and assembles a new team of heroes (including her daughter, implied to also be Captain America's daughter) to end the current Crisis.

=== Catch ===
At the Fortress of Solitude, Krypto is playing with a ball. Using his wind breath, he zooms the ball across the Arctic, where it is suddenly whacked back by Jeff the Land Shark. The two begin to playfully hit the ball back and forth. Then, an arrow strikes and deflates the ball, with a pink text box message tied to it, telling him to come home for dinner, from Jeff's co-owners/parents, Gwen Poole and Kate Bishop. Simultaneously, Krypto's owner, Supergirl, calls him home for dinner as well. Jeff and Krypto give each other a high five and return to their respective caregivers.

=== The Red and the Green ===
In Hell's Kitchen, Daredevil is battling a group of assassins from the League of Shadows on a rooftop. Simultaneously, Green Arrow is fighting a group of ninjas from The Hand on a nearby rooftop. The two leap from their rooftops and land side by side on the street below. Daredevil momentarily mistakes Green Arrow for Hawkeye, but the confusion fades as the two team up to take on the combined forces of the League of Shadows and The Hand.

During the battle, Green Arrow is knocked unconscious by a ninja from The Hand, while Daredevil's heightened senses are incapacitated by Count Vertigo's "Vertigo Effect" (an ability that disrupts his balance and induces extreme dizziness and nausea). Just as Vertigo moves in to kill Daredevil, Green Arrow regains consciousness. He unknowingly attaches one of Jack Murdock's old boxing gloves to an arrow and fires. The arrow strikes Vertigo, destroying his inner-ear implant and disabling the Vertigo Effect. With the battle over, Daredevil and Green Arrow walk off together towards Josie's Bar for a drink and begin trading origin stories.

=== Rocket Raccoon Has A Green Lantern Ring Now ===
The Guardians of the Galaxy (consisting of Star-Lord, Gamora, Drax the Destroyer, Nova, Groot, and Rocket Raccoon) visit the Guardians of the Universe at their homeworld, Oa. They exchange members, with Green Lantern officer Hal Jordan joining the Guardians of the Galaxy, while Rocket becomes an officer of the Green Lantern Corps. During Rocket's first two days as a Green Lantern, he kills Sinestro and commits a heist at a mob casino with Green Arrow. On the third day, the Guardians of the Universe contact Nova to request an exchange, Rocket for Jordan. However, Jordan has become infected with the Parallax–entity while wielding the Infinity Gauntlet and has swiftly defeated the Guardians of the Galaxy and Thanos.

=== Showdown ===
In a dystopian version of Gotham City, an aged–Wolverine begins a brutal fight with an aged–Batman in an alley. To end the fight, Batman plants explosives on Wolverine's belt buckle, which detonate. Despite his injuries, Wolverine vows to fight him again.

=== Enter Logo! ===
In the Amalgam Universe, at the Orbituary Bar, the interstellar mercenary and bounty hunter Logo (an amalgamation of Wolverine and Lobo) knocks out Kultron (an amalgamation of Ultron and Kobra). Before leaving the bar, he blows up Thanoseid's (an amalgamation of Thanos and Darkseid) helicopter, known as the Thanoseidcopter. Logo then flies off on his bike, Weapon XXX, into the galaxy, on his way to hunt down his next bounty: Super-Soldier (an amalgamation of Captain America and Superman).

== Batman/Deadpool (November 2025) ==
=== The Cosmic Kiss Caper! ===
The cosmic entities Eternity and Kismet engage in an unexpected romantic encounter, erupting a cosmic disturbance across the entire multiverse. Destabilizing reality itself, causing the DC Universe and the Marvel Universe to briefly and violently overlap. As dimensional walls begin to warp, Batman detects anomalies on Earth. In Gotham City, he interviews Victor Gover, a former Suicide Squad operative mourning his wife's recent death. Gover reveals that his team had been sent to Greece to secure a mysterious reality-altering artifact—known as the Cosmic Keyboard now suspected to be reacting to the cosmic event. Batman and Robin travel to Greece, only to discover the mission site in chaos: slain Checkmate agents, monstrous interdimensional creatures, and evidence of a collapsing reality, including a Batarang from an alternate universe. However, Cassandra Nova, using her telekinetic and telepathic powers, has been manipulating Batman and Deadpool into finding the Keyboard to rewrite reality to her advantage. Using Deadpool as a pawn and to unknowingly test Batman while guiding both toward the Cosmic Keyboard.

She constructed a maze of warped reality, forcing Batman and Deadpool to navigate bizarre, shifting scenarios. Cassandra telepathically implants false perceptions directly into Deadpool's mind, making him believe that Batman was critically wounded by arrows within the maze. Deadpool throws Batman into one of Ra's al Ghul's Lazarus Pits, and suddenly Dark Claw, an alternate personality of Batman triggered by trauma in the Lazarus Pit combined with Cassandra Nova's manipulations, emerges. Dark Claw attacks Deadpool and briefly fights him. Meanwhile, in the real world, Robin attacks Cassandra, releasing her psychic grip on Batman and Deadpool. They run toward the fortress containing the Cosmic Keyboard, encountering numerous bodies of monstrous interdimensional creatures and an unconscious Batman variant from Earth‑7642. The duo meets The Writer, who has attained the Cosmic Keyboard. Cassandra attempts to subdue the Writer telepathically, but to no avail. Using the Keyboard and the cosmic disturbance, the Writer combines Batman and Deadpool into "Deadbat", who decapitates Cassandra. As the cosmic disturbance ends, both universes return to their normal states, Deadpool restores Cassandra's head, placing it into a jar, and Gover's wife is brought back to life, at the request of Batman.

=== A Magician Walks Into a Universe ===
During the cosmic disturbance affecting the entire multiverse, John Constantine arrives at the Sanctum Sanctorum seeking Doctor Strange's help in separating their worlds and restoring metaphysical balance. A catastrophic breakdown of magical barriers has caused the Hells of both universes to merge, leading to direct conflict between their respective rulers, Neron and Mephisto as well as their avatars, Ghost Rider and Swamp Thing. Constantine claims he has come to form an alliance, but this is a calculated lie; his true objective is to acquire the Eye of Agamotto, an artifact he knows Strange would never willingly relinquish. After a tense exchange and a brief display of magical manipulation, Constantine manages to use the Eye, ultimately with Strange's reluctant assistance, to separate the fused hell-realms and undo the cosmic collision. With the crisis resolved, Constantine and Strange part ways as uneasy allies, their mutual respect tempered by distrust.

=== Sticks & Snikts ===
Gabby Kinney, the clone of Laura Kinney (Wolverine), is missing in Gotham City. Wolverine searches for her, and tries to contact Batman, whom is unavailable. His protégé Nightwing offers his help to find Gabby. Using Gabby's scent, the duo tracks it to the sewers. As they explore the sewers, they find Gabby in a cage and rescue her. Suddenly, Killer Croc appears and attacks them. Fearfully, Croc stops, and Gabby reveals that she was not kidnapped by him; instead, he had taken Jonathan, Gabby's pet wolverine. Nightwing subdues Croc, and later at the Clock Tower, the duo, along with Gabby and Barbara Gordon, sit down and eat Chinese food with Jonathan and Haley, Nightwing's dog. Afterward, Nightwing and Wolverine leave and, on a rooftop, talk about their childhoods and their respective fathers: Batman and the original Wolverine.

=== Harley & Hulk's Amazin' Saturday!!!! ===
Harley Quinn is at the Acid Reign Amusement Park in Gotham City, getting a hot dog from a hot-dog stand, when all of a sudden a rat-like robot comes racing through, pursued by the Hulk. The robot accidentally crashes into the hot-dog stand and carries it off, barreling into a waste-management facility and smashing into a vat of toxic waste. As Harley and the Hulk look on, toxic hot dogs leap out of the vat and begin attacking them. The Hulk throws Harley toward the control panel, and she turns the switch from "hot" to "cold," freezing all the hot dogs. As Harley proclaims to the Hulk, "Let's do it again!"

=== New Friends in Old Places ===
Kamala Khan and Virgil Hawkins are both eating dinner with their respective families when a kaiju begins attacking the city. Kamala suits up as Ms. Marvel, while Virgil suits up as Static. Ms. Marvel and Static meet and team up to defeat the kaiju.

== Reception ==
Michael Guerrero and Christopher Franey, in a joint review of Deadpool/Batman #1 for AIPT, both praised the issue's main story. Guerrero commented that while apprehensive going in, he was "pleasantly surprised" as Zeb Wells "wrote a captivating story with fun twists and turns. As a result, I'm glad I took a leap of faith on this crossover, and encourage everyone else to do the same". Similarly, Franey wrote that "Wells does a fantastic job of capturing the voices" of Deadpool and Batman. Franey opined that the premise of these two characters together was "a hard sell", however, "playing Deadpool against the Joker is such a brilliant move. Having those two crazies play against and with Batman is worth the price tag alone".

== Related ==
- Superman vs. The Amazing Spider-Man: The Battle of the Century (March 1976) – The first modern superhero intercompany crossover. In the story, Superman and Spider-Man must stop a world domination/destruction plot hatched in tandem by their respective arch-nemeses, Lex Luthor and Doctor Octopus.
  - Its sequel Superman and Spider-Man (1981), which also pits Superman against the Hulk and Spider-Man against Wonder Woman.
- The Uncanny X-Men and The New Teen Titans (1982) – A one-shot intercompany crossover, features the two companies' teams of superheroes, Marvel's X-Men, and DC's New Teen Titans. In the story, the X-Men and the New Teen Titans team-up against the New God Darkseid, aided by Metron, attempting to harness the power of the Phoenix Force.
- DC vs. Marvel (February to May 1996) – A four issue intercompany crossover miniseries, which pitted Marvel Comics superheroes against their DC Comics counterparts in battle. The outcome of each battle was determined by reader ballot, which were distributed in advance to comic book stores.
  - Amalgam Comics: a collaborative publishing imprint shared by DC and Marvel, in which the two comic book publishers merged their characters into new ones.
- JLA/Avengers (September 2003 to March 2004) – A four issue intercompany crossover miniseries, features the two companies' teams of superheroes, DC Comics' Justice League of America and Marvel's Avengers. The crossover is officially canon for both companies; the cosmic egg introduced in JLA/Avengers has appeared in DC's Trinity and in Marvel's Official Handbook of the Marvel Universe.

== See also ==
- Publication history of DC Comics crossover events
- Publication history of Marvel Comics crossover events
