= Terry Austin (illustrator) =

American comics artist

- Born: Terry Kevin Austin; August 23, 1952 (age 74) Detroit, Michigan, U.S.
- Areas: Writer, Inker
- Notable works: Uncanny X-Men
- Awards: Eagle Awards, Favourite Inker, 1977, 1978, 1979, 1983, 1985, 1986, and 1987. Inkpot Award, 1980. Comics Buyer's Guide Fan Award, Favorite Inker, 1986, 1987, 1988, 1989, 1996, 1997. Inkwell Awards, The Joe Sinnott Award, 2009

Terry Kevin Austin (born August 23, 1952) is an American comic book creator working primarily as an inker.

== Early life and career ==
Austin grew up in Detroit, Michigan, and attended Wayne State University. He started inking comics as an assistant to Dick Giordano and Neal Adams, doing "Crusty Bunker" work for Adams' Continuity Associates. Austin came to prominence in 1976–1977, inking Marshall Rogers' pencils on a celebrated run of Batman stories for DC Comics' Detective Comics collaborating with writer Steve Englehart. During this same period, Austin inked Michael Netzer (Nasser) on DC's Martian Manhunter in Adventure Comics and Green Arrow/Black Canary in World's Finest Comics, as well as Al Milgrom on Marvel Comics' Captain Marvel. He later teamed with Rogers again on Marvel's Doctor Strange.

Austin's inks on John Byrne's pencils, from Uncanny X-Men #141 (Jan. 1981), p. 12.

=== X-Men ===
In 1977, Austin and penciler John Byrne became the new art team on Uncanny X-Men. With writer Chris Claremont they produced a series of stories — particularly "The Dark Phoenix Saga" — which elevated the title into the top-selling American comic book. Austin was given the Eagle Award for Favourite Inker three times during this period.

=== Post-X-Men ===
Austin left Uncanny X-Men in 1981 and has since worked on a variety of titles for both Marvel and DC, including Doctor Strange (over Paul Smith and Dan Green pencils), Superman vol. 2 (over Byrne), Justice League (over Kevin Maguire) and Green Lantern (over Darryl Banks). Austin contributed to several anniversary issues for DC including Justice League of America #200 (March 1982), Superman #400 (Oct. 1984), and Batman #400 (Oct. 1986). He was the regular inker of DC's Superman Adventures for nearly six years, from 1996–2002. His inking work since 2002 has included over fifteen years of inking the Sonic the Hedgehog comic book series for Archie Comics, which he continued until the series was cancelled in 2017.

== Inking style and influence ==
Austin's inking — especially in the period of the 1970s and early 1980s — is notable for its smooth, precise rendering; and extremely detailed backgrounds, making his embellishing work easily identifiable. His style has been highly influential on a subsequent generation of inkers including Al Gordon, Andy Lanning, Scott Williams, and Rob Liefeld.

== Writing and penciling ==
Austin has also worked as a writer, primarily for Marvel's X-Men titles and a run on Cloak and Dagger. Austin wrote and inked the Dark Horse Comics' adaptation of Splinter of the Mind's Eye published in 1995.

His rare penciling jobs can be seen on the covers of Uncanny X-Men #123, #142 and Annual #3 (with Frank Miller), as well as his self-published book, Austin Art: 60 Pages of Drawings by Terry Austin (2003).

== Personal life ==
Austin resides near Poughkeepsie, New York, where he plays volleyball and gets together often with fellow comics veteran Fred Hembeck. Austin's affection for the comic strip character Popeye is well-established, and over the years Austin has included drawings of Popeye in various published comics as "Easter eggs" for sharp-eyed readers.

== Awards ==
Austin's work has gained him frequent and notable recognition over the years, including multiple Eagle Awards for best inker, an Inkpot Award, multiple Comics Buyer's Guide Fan Awards for Favorite Inker, and the Inkwell Awards 2008 "Favorite Inker (Retro) Award" and the 2009 "Joe Sinnott Award".

== Bibliography ==
=== Aardvark-Vanaheim ===
- Cerebus Jam #1 (1985)

=== Atlas/Seaboard Comics ===
- Phoenix #3 (1975)

=== Archie Comics ===
- Sonic the Hedgehog (2002–2017)

=== Dark Horse Comics ===
- Star Wars: Splinter of the Mind's Eye (1995–1996)

=== DC Comics ===
- Action Comics #682 (1992)
- Adventure Comics #449–451 (1977)
- Adventures in the DC Universe Annual #1 (1997)
- All-New Collectors' Edition #C–56 (Superman vs. Muhammad Ali) (background inks) (1978)
- All-Star Western vol. 3 #7 (2012)
- Armageddon: Inferno #3–4 (1992)
- Batman #400, 500 (1986–1993)
- Batman and Robin Adventures Annual #1 (1996)
- The Batman Chronicles #1–2 (1995)
- Batman Family #12 (1977)
- Batman: Dark Detective #1–6 (2005)
- Batman: Gotham Adventures #51 (2002)
- Batman: Gotham Knights #21 (2001)
- Batman: Legends of the Dark Knight #11–15 (1990–1991)
- Big Book of Hoaxes (1996)
- Big Book of Little Criminals (1996)
- Big Book of Urban Legends (1994)
- The Brave and the Bold #166 (Batman and Black Canary) (1980)
- Camelot 3000 #7–12 (1983–1985)
- Captain Atom #51 (1991)
- Cartoon Network Presents #17 (1999)
- DC Challenge #10 (1986)
- DC Retroactive: Green Lantern – The '90s #1 (2011)
- DC Special Series #10 (1978)
- Detective Comics #450–451, 463–468, 471–476 (1975–1978)
- Doom Patrol vol. 4 #13–14 (2005)
- The Flash #233–234, 243, 245–246 (1975–1977) (Green Lantern back-up stories)
- Green Lantern vol. 2 #93–94, 171, Annual #3 (1977–1987)
- Green Lantern vol. 3 #65, 85, 88–89, 91–95, 97–100, 102, 104, 106–114, 117 (1995–1999)
- Green Lantern Corps Quarterly #4, 7 (1993)
- Green Lantern/Superman: Legend of the Green Flame (2000)
- Guy Gardner Annual #2 (1996)
- Guy Gardner: Warrior #31 (1995)
- Heroes Against Hunger #1 (1986)
- Impulse #88–89 (2002)
- Justice League #1, 60 (1987–1992)
- Justice League of America #200 (1982)
- Just Imagine Stan Lee with John Byrne Creating Robin #1 (2002)
- Kobra #3 (1976)
- Legion of Super-Heroes Annual vol. 4 #4 (1993)
- Mister Miracle vol. 3 #5–6 (1996)
- Mystery in Space #112 (1980)
- Orion #13–14 (2001)
- Secret Origins vol. 2 #6 (1986)
- Showcase '93 #9–10 (1993)
- Showcase '95 #4 (1995)
- Spirit #17, 19 (2008)
- Superman #400, Annual #9 (1983–1984)
- Superman vol. 2 #1–3, Annual #3 (1987–1991)
- Superman Adventures #1–19, 21–31, 33–56, 58–66 (1996–2002)
- Superman: The Man of Steel #49 (1995)
- Superman: The Wedding Album #1 (1996)
- Titans #25 (2001)
- Weird War Tales #51–52 (1977)
- Who's Who in Star Trek #2 (1987)
- Who's Who in the DC Universe #9–14 (1991)
- Who's Who in the DC Universe Update 1993 #1–2 (1992–1993)
- Who's Who: The Definitive Directory of the DC Universe #2–8, 15–16, 22, 25 (1985–1987)
- Who's Who: Update '87 #3 (1987)
- World's Finest Comics #244–246 (1977)
- Young Justice: Our Worlds at War #1 (2001)

==== DC Comics and Dark Horse Comics ====
- Batman Versus Predator II: Bloodmatch #1–4 (1994–1995)

==== DC Comics and Marvel Comics ====
- Amazon #1 (1996)
- Green Lantern / Silver Surfer: Unholy Alliances #1 (1995)
- Silver Surfer / Superman #1 (1996)

=== Image Comics ===
- Savage Dragon #3 (1993)
- WildC.A.T.s #23 (1995)

=== Malibu Comics ===
- Hardcase #15 (1994)
- Mantra #7 (1994)
- Ultraforce #5 (1995)

=== Marvel Comics ===
- Adventures of Captain America #2–4 (1991–1992)
- The Adventures of Cyclops and Phoenix #2–3 (1994)
- Alien Legion #1–5 (1984)
- Alpha Flight #17, 47 (1984–1987)
- Amazing Adventure #1 (1988)
- The Amazing Spider-Man #248, 335, 337, Annual #13 (1979–1990)
- The Avengers #184 (1979)
- Cloak and Dagger #1-4 (1983)
- Doctor Strange vol. 2 #48–60, 66, 68, 70, 73 (1981–1985)
- Epic Illustrated #15–20, 26–34 (1982–1986)
- Fantastic Four #286 (1986)
- The Further Adventures of Indiana Jones #1–2 (1983)
- New Mutants #41–42, 53–61, 64–66, Special Edition #1 (1986–1988)
- Marvel and DC Present The Uncanny X-Men and The New Teen Titans (1982)
- Marvel Treasury Edition #28 (Superman and Spider-Man) (background inks) (1981)
- Uncanny X-Men #108–109, 111–117, 119–143, 186, 237, 294–296, 316, Annual #3, 7, 9, 10, 13 (as writer) (1977–1994)

=== Other publishers ===
- Austin Art: 60 Pages of Drawings by Terry Austin (self-published, 2003)

Preceded by Vince Colletta	Detective Comics inker 1977–1978	Succeeded by Dick Giordano
Preceded by Dan Green	Uncanny X-Men inker 1977–1981	Succeeded by Josef Rubinstein
Preceded by Dan Green	Doctor Strange vol. 2 inker 1981–1983	Succeeded by Rick Magyar
Preceded by Romeo Tanghal	Green Lantern vol. 3 inker 1997–1999	Succeeded by Anibal Rodriguez
