= Bob Wiacek =

American comic book artist and writer (born 1953)

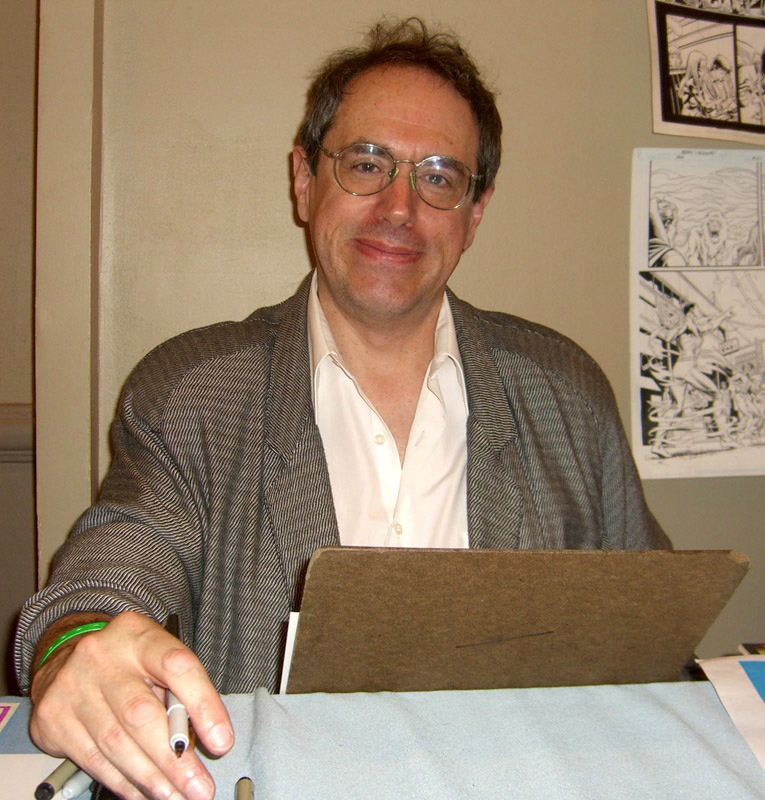
- Wiacek at the Big Apple Summer Sizzler in Manhattan, June 13, 2009
- Born: Robert Wiacek; January 7, 1953 (age 73)
- Area: Inker
- Notable works: Star Wars; Uncanny X-Men; Power Pack; X-Factor; The Brave and the Bold (vol. 2)
- Awards: Inkwell Awards Joe Sinnott Hall of Fame Award
- Spouse: Ann Karavitis (m. 1980; died 2012)

Bob Wiacek (/ˈwaɪətʃɛk/; born January 7, 1953) is an American comic book artist and writer, working primarily as an inker.

Wiacek has inked over such pencilers as Carmine Infantino on Star Wars, Paul Smith and John Romita Jr. on The Uncanny X-Men, June Brigman on Power Pack, John Byrne on Alpha Flight and Sensational She-Hulk, Walter Simonson on X-Factor and Orion, and George Pérez on Brave and the Bold, volume 2. He has also worked with creators such as Bob Budiansky, Colleen Doran, Ron Garney, Mike Grell, Michael Netzer, Kevin Nowlan, Don Perlin, Bill Sienkiewicz, Todd McFarlane, and Barry Windsor-Smith.

== Education ==
Wiacek attended the School of Visual Arts in New York City from 1971 to 1974.

== Career ==
Wiacek got his start in the mid-1970s as a member of the "Crusty Bunkers" inking collective. For a short time in 1975–1976, he inked backgrounds (over Curt Swan's pencils) on Superman for DC Comics. He moved on to regular inking work for DC, and then in 1978 began a long association with Marvel which lasted until 1993.

Wiacek's first regular title was on Man-Thing issues #1-11, from 1979 to 1981, where he inked over Jim Mooney's pencils and then provided finished art based on Don Perlin's breakdowns. During this same period, Wiacek was the regular inker on Marvel's Star Wars comic, issues #16-37, working with Carmine Infantino.

In 1981, Wiacek moved on to be the regular inker on Uncanny X-Men, primarily inking Paul Smith in issues #159–176. Wiacek's next regular stint was John Byrne's inker on Alpha Flight, issues #15-29 in 1984–1985. Overlapping with that job was Wiacek's work as inker for June Brigman on Power Pack issues #1-26. He followed Byrne onto the Hulk as the main inker on Byrnes 1980s Incredible Hulk run issues #314-319; and marvel fanfare # 20.

In the years 1986–1989, Wiacek was the primary inker on X-Factor, issues #10-37, working with Walt Simonson. Wiacek then moved on to Sensational She-Hulk #1-11, reuniting with John Byrne for much of that period.

From 1990 to 1992, Wiacek embarked on his longest stretch as an inker, working with John Romita Jr. and then Bob Layton on Iron Man issues #258–283.

Wiacek's last long-term inking stint was on DC Comics' Orion, inking over Walt Simonson's pencils for issues #8-22, from 2001 to 2002.

Over the years, Wiacek has also inked comics published by Dark Horse and Valiant.

Wiacek taught first-year students at the Joe Kubert School of Cartoon and Graphic Art for a brief period in the early 1990s.

In 2022, Wiacek was awarded the Inkwell Awards Joe Sinnott Hall of Fame Award for his lifetime achievement in the art of inking.

== Personal life ==
Wiacek married computer analyst Ann Karavitis in November 1980. She died in 2012; together, they had one son.

== Selected works ==
- Superman #293-301 (DC, 1975) — background inks only
- Superboy and the Legion of Super-Heroes #220–225 (DC, 1976–1977)
- Ghost Rider #36–46 (Marvel, 1978–1980) — covers only
- Man-Thing #1-11 (Marvel, 1979–1981)
- Star Wars #16-37 (Marvel, 1979–1981)
- Uncanny X-Men #150, 159-176 (Marvel, 1981–1983)
- Coyote #4-9 (Marvel, 1984)
- Alpha Flight #15-29 (Marvel, 1984–1985)
- Power Pack #1-26 (Marvel, 1984–1986)
- X-Factor #10-37 (Marvel, 1986–1989)
- Strange Tales #6–16 (Marvel, 1987–1988)
- The Incredible Hulk #340 (Marvel, 1988) — cover only
- Sensational She-Hulk #1-11 (Marvel, 1989–1990)
- Iron Man #258–283 (Marvel, 1990–1992)
- Archer & Armstrong #3-10 (Valiant, 1992–1993)
- Excalibur #94-103 (Marvel, 1996)
- Silver Surfer #123-131 (Marvel, 1996–1997)
- Orion #8-22 (DC, 2001–2002)
- The Brave and the Bold vol. 2, #1-9 (DC, 2007–2008)
