= Superman and Spider-Man =

1981 DC-Marvel crossover comic book

Marvel Treasury Edition #28: Superman and Spider-Man
- Cover of Superman and Spider-Man (1981). Painted art by Bob Larkin from a layout by John Romita, Sr.

Publication information
- Publisher: DC Comics/Marvel Comics
- Format: One-shot
- Genre: Superhero
- Publication date: July 1981
- No. of issues: 1
- Main character(s): Superman; Spider-Man; Doctor Doom; Parasite; Hulk; Wonder Woman

Creative team
- Written by: Jim Shooter, Marv Wolfman
- Penciller: John Buscema
- Inker(s): Terry Austin, Klaus Janson, Bob Layton, Steve Leialoha, Bob McLeod, Al Milgrom, Josef Rubinstein, Walter Simonson, Joe Sinnott, Bob Wiacek
- Letterer: Joe Rosen
- Colorist: Glynis Wein

Superman and Spider-Man is an intercompany comic book jointly published by DC Comics and Marvel Comics in July 1981. Number 28 (and final) in the Marvel Treasury Edition series, it is a sequel to 1976's Superman vs. the Amazing Spider-Man.

Like the earlier Superman - Spider-Man crossover, the issue is noncanonical, as it assumes that the heroes and their respective cities of residence, Metropolis and New York, exist in the same universe. There is one brief reference to the earlier crossover story, when Peter Parker sees Lois Lane in Metropolis and recalls meeting her previously in New York.

A third and fourth crossover were announced in 2025. The third, Superman/Spider-Man will be published by DC on March 26, 2026. The fourth, Spider-Man/Superman, was published by Marvel on April 15, 2026.

== Publication history ==
Superman vs. the Amazing Spider-Man was a collaboration between the two companies; this second treasury-sized edition was largely the work of Marvel, with DC's approval. The first team-up featured the heroes' most popular enemies, Lex Luthor and Doctor Octopus, but with this story writer Jim Shooter clearly sought plot convenience over "rogues gallery" prominence, and chose Doctor Doom (more typically a Fantastic Four villain, though he had occasionally battled Spider-Man and would do so in the future as well) from Marvel, and the Parasite (a Superman foe) from DC. The comic also pits Superman against the Hulk for the first time, and Spider-Man against Wonder Woman.

The book was officially co-written by Shooter and Marv Wolfman, who at the time was writing the popular DC title The New Teen Titans. John Buscema penciled the story, and Joe Sinnott inked the main figures. The backgrounds were inked by a who's who of contemporary Marvel talent: Terry Austin, Klaus Janson, Bob Layton, Steve Leialoha, Bob McLeod, Al Milgrom, Josef Rubinstein, Walt Simonson, Brett Breeding, and Bob Wiacek. The front cover was painted by Bob Larkin from a layout by John Romita Sr.

Other features of the book include Superman and Spider-Man's origins on the inside front cover, an earlier cover concept on the inside back cover, and house ads for both Marvel and DC.

== Plot ==
The story begins in Manhattan, where Spider-Man foils a bank robbery. Easily dispatching the criminals, his Spider-sense alerts him about a nearby construction site, but unable to determine any immediate danger, he moves on. The reader learns, however, that the site camouflages an elaborate base of the Latverian monarch Doctor Doom, connected with a years-long plot of his known as "Project Omega". Doom initiates Omega by luring the Hulk to Superman's hometown of Metropolis using a special micro-transmitter.

Spider-Man's alter-ego of Peter Parker is assigned by the Daily Bugle to cover the Hulk's advance towards Metropolis. Parker arrives in Metropolis just in time to witness the confrontation between Superman and the Hulk. Parker changes into Spider-Man, but is outclassed and unable to help. Battling the Hulk, Superman discovers the beacon and destroys it, calming the Hulk and winning his trust. The Hulk reverts to Bruce Banner, but Doom's plan has worked: the damage Hulk caused released Parasite from a special underground cell. S.T.A.R. Labs takes custody of Banner, hoping to find a cure for his condition. Doom, monitoring everything, still needs Banner for his plan, and now he knows exactly where to find him.

Peter Parker goes to work for the Daily Planet while Superman's alter-ego of Clark Kent takes a leave and joins the staff of the Bugle in New York City, each seeking to investigate the crisis from a different end. Superman has realized that the Hulk's rampage was designed to free Parasite, and reasons that, as Luthor is behind bars, only Doom could be behind the scheme. Superman visits the monarch of Latveria at its New York embassy, where Doom freely admits he's plotting world domination. Superman is sworn to uphold the laws of men, and on Latverian soil, Doom is the law. He even makes an attempt to capture the Man of Steel, but Superman uses the lead-lined everything room of Doom's headquarters to his advantage. When Doom releases some kryptonite, Superman rolls himself in the lead-lining and blocks the radiation. Nonetheless, Doom remains untouchable.

While Clark Kent works his mild-mannered charm on the Bugle's cantankerous publisher J. Jonah Jameson, Peter Parker has to deal with Steve Lombard, the jock sportscaster who harassed Kent throughout the 1970s. Soon enough, Parker stumbles onto the Metropolis division of Doom's Project Omega, around the same time as Wonder Woman, who has also been following this case. Actually Doom planted evidence in order to lure Wonder Woman; her capture is also part of his master plan. Spider-Man and Wonder Woman fall into fighting under false pretenses, but quickly realize they're on the same side and join forces. Doom captures Wonder Woman before they can accomplish anything, however, while Spider-Man escapes and trails her captors to their destination, finally learning the truth about Project Omega.

The Omega installations, positioned all across the world, will go online and emit a particular radiation which will render most forms of fuel useless. Only a special generator — built by Doom, of course — will provide the energy the world needs; he will step in and make himself absolute monarch. In exchange for making him Doom's privileged enforcer, Doom enhances Parasite's abilities with the absorbed powers of Wonder Woman, the Hulk, and Superman. Parasite likes the idea, but only because he intends to turn on Doom. Doom knows that all that power will burn out Parasite, turning his body into a crystal with energy-absorbing properties that will allow Doom to use it to control the power of his super-reactor.

The story comes to a climax as the heroes battle Parasite, Doom and his henchmen, and a giant robot. Doom and Parasite turn on each other after Parasite absorbs some of Spider-Man's powers during the fight and his spider-sense alerts him to the danger of Doom's plan. Superman and Spider-Man use their respective abilities to foil Doom's plot, Spider-Man using his webbing as an improvised 'lint brush' to 'clean' Superman of the kryptonite dust Doom used to immobilize him, and Superman subsequently taking Doom's gauntlet to knock out Parasite (correctly deducing that Doom would have developed an armour that would prevent Parasite from absorbing him). They also prevent the accidental world-destroying explosion of Doom's super-reactor after the controls are damaged in the fight; Superman contains the reactor from the inside long enough for Spider-Man to use his spider-sense to find the lever necessary to fully turn the reactor off. The Hulk wanders off when the stasis tube in which he was imprisoned cracks, while Parasite is recaptured and Wonder Woman released after the crisis is over. Doom manages to make it back to the Latverian Embassy, where he enjoys diplomatic immunity, seconds before Superman catches up with him.
