= Amalgam Comics =

Defunct collaborative publishing imprint shared by DC Comics and Marvel Comics

- Amalgam Comics logo
- Parent company: DC Comics; Marvel Comics
- Founded: 1996; 30 years ago
- Defunct: 1997; 29 years ago
- Country of origin: United States
- Publication types: Comic books
- Fiction genres: Superhero fiction

Amalgam Comics was a collaborative publishing imprint shared by DC Comics and Marvel Comics, in which the two comic book publishers merged their characters into new ones (e.g., the DC character Batman and the Marvel character Wolverine became the Amalgam Comics character the Dark Claw). These characters first appeared in a series of 12 one-shots which were published in April 1996 between Marvel Comics versus DC #3 and DC versus Marvel Comics #4, the last two issues of the DC vs. Marvel crossover event. A second set of 12 one-shots followed one year later in June 1997, but without the crossover event as a background. All 24 of these one-shots took place between the aforementioned issues of DC vs. Marvel Comics.

Marvel Encyclopedia: Fantastic Four (2004) originally designated the Amalgam Universe as Earth-962 in the Marvel Multiverse, then The Official Handbook of the Marvel Universe: Alternate Universes 2005 re-designated it as Earth-9602. The Essential Wonder Woman Encyclopedia (2015) designated the Amalgam Universe as Earth-496 in the DC Multiverse. In Dark Crisis: Big Bang #1 (February 2023), it was re-designated as Earth 1996.

== Publication history ==
On two separate occasions – April 1996 and June 1997 – DC and Marvel co-published a total of 24 one-shot "first issues" (12 in April 1996 (six by DC and six by Marvel) and 12 in June 1997 (again, six by DC and six by Marvel)) under the imprint Amalgam Comics. The issues were all presented as if the "company" had existed for decades, with stories and editorial comments referring to a fictional history stretching back to the Golden Age of Comic Books, including retcons and reboots; for example, they referred to Secret Crisis of the Infinity Hour (an amalgamation of Marvel's Marvel Super Heroes Secret Wars, DC's Crisis on Infinite Earths, Marvel's The Infinity Gauntlet, and DC's Zero Hour: Crisis in Time!, respectively), which featured the well-known cover of Crisis on Infinite Earths #7, but with Super-Soldier holding the dead body of his teenage sidekick the American Girl (an amalgamation of DC's Supergirl and Marvel's Carol Danvers and James Buchanan "Bucky" Barnes) instead of Superman holding the dead body of Supergirl. Nineteen of the 24 issues included phony letter columns to provide the illusion of background to the stories, with the fans' hometowns formed by amalgamating the names of existing American cities.

The first Amalgam event occurred near the end of the four-issue DC vs. Marvel crossover event in April 1996. In Marvel Comics versus DC #3, the DC and Marvel Universes were shown being combined into one – the Amalgam Universe – and the Amalgam one-shots were presented as the result of this. The first 12 Amalgam titles were released the following week, delaying both publishers' regular releases by one week. Six of the issues in the event were published by DC and six by Marvel. In June 1997 the process was repeated, but without the crossover event as a background. Later, both publishers collected their respective 12 issues into four trade paperback collections. All 24 of the Amalgam one-shots took place between Marvel Comics versus DC #3 and DC versus Marvel Comics #4, the last two issues of the crossover event.

Between the two events of Amalgam Comics, the two publishers released a sequel crossover miniseries to DC vs. Marvel #1–4 primarily published by DC, DC/Marvel: All Access #1–4 (Dec. 1996–Feb. 1997 (issues #2 and 3 were both cover dated Jan. 1997)). A second sequel crossover miniseries primarily published by Marvel, Unlimited Access #1–4 (Dec. 1997–March 1998), followed the second event. Both crossover miniseries featured additional Amalgam characters.

The Amalgam universe was later revisited in 2025, starting with Deadpool/Batman, with the introduction of Logo, an amalgamation of DC's Lobo and Marvel's Wolverine in a backup story. The story also features Kultron and Thanoseid and references Super-Soldier, characters who had made their debut in the original 1996–1997 events. Batman/Deadpool also introduced Deadbat, an amalgamation of DC's Batman and Marvel's Deadpool, while featuring the return of Dark Claw from the 1996–1997 events.

== Fictional origin of the Amalgam Universe ==
The two comic book universes came together when the two cosmic beings who were the physical incarnations of their respective universes (referred to as "the Brothers") became aware of each other after eons of slumber. To prevent the Brothers from destroying each other, characters from each universe battled to determine which universe would survive (a real world vote by readers of the series was conducted to determine the outcome of five of the in-comic battles, with three of them favoring the Marvel hero). Access, a new character created specifically for the event and co-owned by both DC and Marvel, served as a gatekeeper who became stuck while traveling between the two universes.

When the battles were finished, neither universe was willing to go. To prevent their total destruction, the Spectre and the Living Tribunal created an amalgamated universe, in which only Access and Doctor Strangefate (Charles Xavier) (an amalgamation of Doctor Fate, Doctor Strange and Professor X) knew the truth about the merge. The two characters fought against each other either to reverse the change (in the case of Access) or to preserve it (in the case of Doctor Strangefate).

Access managed to separate the Brothers with the help of the Amalgam Universe's superheroes; before the merge had taken place, he had planted shards of the two universes inside Batman and Captain America. Once he discovered the Dark Claw (an amalgamation of Batman and Wolverine) and Super-Soldier (an amalgamation of Superman and Captain America), he used those shards to give the Spectre and the Living Tribunal the power to restore the two universes. Batman, Captain America and Access were thus able to make the Brothers realize that their conflict was pointless and the two universes were separated once again.

== Amalgam Comics characters ==
During the crossover event, pairs of DC and Marvel characters were merged into single characters. The same was done with teams and fictional locations.

== Amalgam Comics comic books ==
The 24 one-shots have been reprinted in four trade paperbacks:

- The Amalgam Age of Comics: The DC Comics Collection:
  - Amazon #1
  - Assassins #1
  - Doctor StrangeFate #1
  - JLX #1
  - Legends of the Dark Claw #1
  - Super-Soldier #1
- The Amalgam Age of Comics: The Marvel Comics Collection:
  - Bruce Wayne: Agent of S.H.I.E.L.D. #1
  - Bullets and Bracelets #1
  - Magneto and the Magnetic Men #1
  - Speed Demon #1
  - Spider-Boy #1
  - X-Patrol #1

- Return to the Amalgam Age of Comics: The DC Comics Collection:
  - Bat-Thing #1
  - Dark Claw Adventures #1
  - Generation Hex #1
  - JLX Unleashed #1
  - Lobo the Duck #1
  - Super-Soldier: Man of War #1
- Return to the Amalgam Age of Comics: The Marvel Comics Collection:
  - Challengers of the Fantastic #1
  - The Exciting X-Patrol #1
  - Iron Lantern #1
  - The Magnetic Men featuring Magneto #1
  - Spider-Boy Team-Up #1
  - Thorion of the New Asgods #1

== See also ==
- Crossover (fiction)
- Intercompany crossovers in comics
- DC vs. Marvel
- JLA/Avengers
- Crusaders (DC Comics) and Crusaders (Marvel Comics)
- "Infinity Wars", a Marvel Comics storyline where Marvel characters were amalgamated with other Marvel characters
