= Cassandra Nova =

Fictional character

Cassandra Nova Xavier
- Cassandra Nova as depicted in X-Men Red #4 (May 2018).

Publication information
- Publisher: Marvel Comics
- First appearance: New X-Men #114 (July 2001)
- Created by: Grant Morrison; Frank Quitely

In-story information
- Alter ego: Cassandra Nova Xavier
- Species: Mummudrai
- Team affiliations: Marauders; 3K
- Notable aliases: Charles Xavier / Professor X
- Abilities: Telepathy; Telekinesis; Intangibility; Possession

Cassandra Nova Xavier is a supervillain appearing in American comic books published by Marvel Comics, most commonly in association with the X-Men. Created by writer Grant Morrison and artist Frank Quitely, the character first appeared in New X-Men #114 (July 2001). She is a mummudrai, a parasitic life form born bodiless on the astral plane.

Cassandra is the twin sister of X-Men founder, the telepath Professor X (Charles Xavier). While in the womb together, Xavier recognized her evil presence and killed her, resulting in her stillbirth. The mummudrai that became Cassandra became telepathically entangled with Xavier, granting Cassandra some psionic powers herself, including the ability to exit the womb and create a body, with which she sought revenge on Xavier. As Xavier's ideological dark shadow who is bent on destruction and genocide, Nova is most infamous for being responsible for the massacre of 16 million mutants within the mutant homeland Genosha. In 2009, Cassandra Nova was ranked as IGN's 50th Greatest Comic Book Villain of All Time, the only villain introduced in the 21st century to make the list.

The character made her live-action debut in the Marvel Cinematic Universe (MCU) film Deadpool & Wolverine (2024), portrayed by Emma Corrin.

== Fictional character biography ==
Cassandra Nova is a mummudrai, a parasitic entity who began life at the same time as Charles Xavier. Conceived without a body, Nova copied Xavier's DNA to make her own body, effectively making her his twin sister. She grew with her brother until she had fully formed hands and eyes, when she decided to try to kill Xavier by attempting to strangle him with his own umbilical cord. Xavier defended himself by hitting her with a psychic blast, which caused their mother to have a miscarriage, resulting in her physical body being stillborn. Nova survived as a mass of cells that clung to a sewer wall for decades, rebuilding her physical form and swearing revenge on Xavier.

Nova manipulates Donald Trask to utilize the Sentinel technology, which she gains control of by duplicating Trask's DNA. Nova kills Trask, then attacks Genosha with the Wild Sentinels, killing 16 million mutants.

Nova is captured by Cyclops and Wolverine and taken to the X-Mansion, where she escapes and defeats most of the X-Men easily. Nova uses Cerebra, an enhanced version of Cerebro, to switch bodies with Xavier. Nova plans on using Cerebra to eliminate all mutants until she is stopped by Jean Grey, who forces her out of Xavier's body.

During the Krakoan Age, Nova moves to the mutant nation of Krakoa, having been given a second chance per the island's laws. She resides in a hidden section of Krakoa, away from the Quiet Council's influence. Nova assists the Marauders when they travel two billion years into the past to save the ancient mutant civilization of Threshold from destruction. Kitty Pryde, Somnus, and Emma Frost, predicting that Nova would betray them, use Frost's powers to create an impenetrable crystal box in Pryde's mind that keeps Nova from discovering their plan. Kept alive but immobile and imprisoned in Threshold's "zero cells", Nova is left stranded in the past.

Sometime after the fall of Krakoa at the hands of Orchis, Nova joins the pro-mutant group 3K.

== Powers and abilities ==
Cassandra Nova is able to access the full spectrum of latent mutant functions in Charles Xavier's genome, granting herself vast psionic powers. These powers include telepathy, telekinesis, and intangibility. Nova has all the powers of the "average" mummudrai as well, which are astral manipulation, mental possession, and genetic alternation. Her telepathic capabilities are so advanced that she was able to hide her possession of her brother's body, even from other telepaths. Nova can also manipulate her body to rapidly heal herself.

== In other media ==
=== Film ===
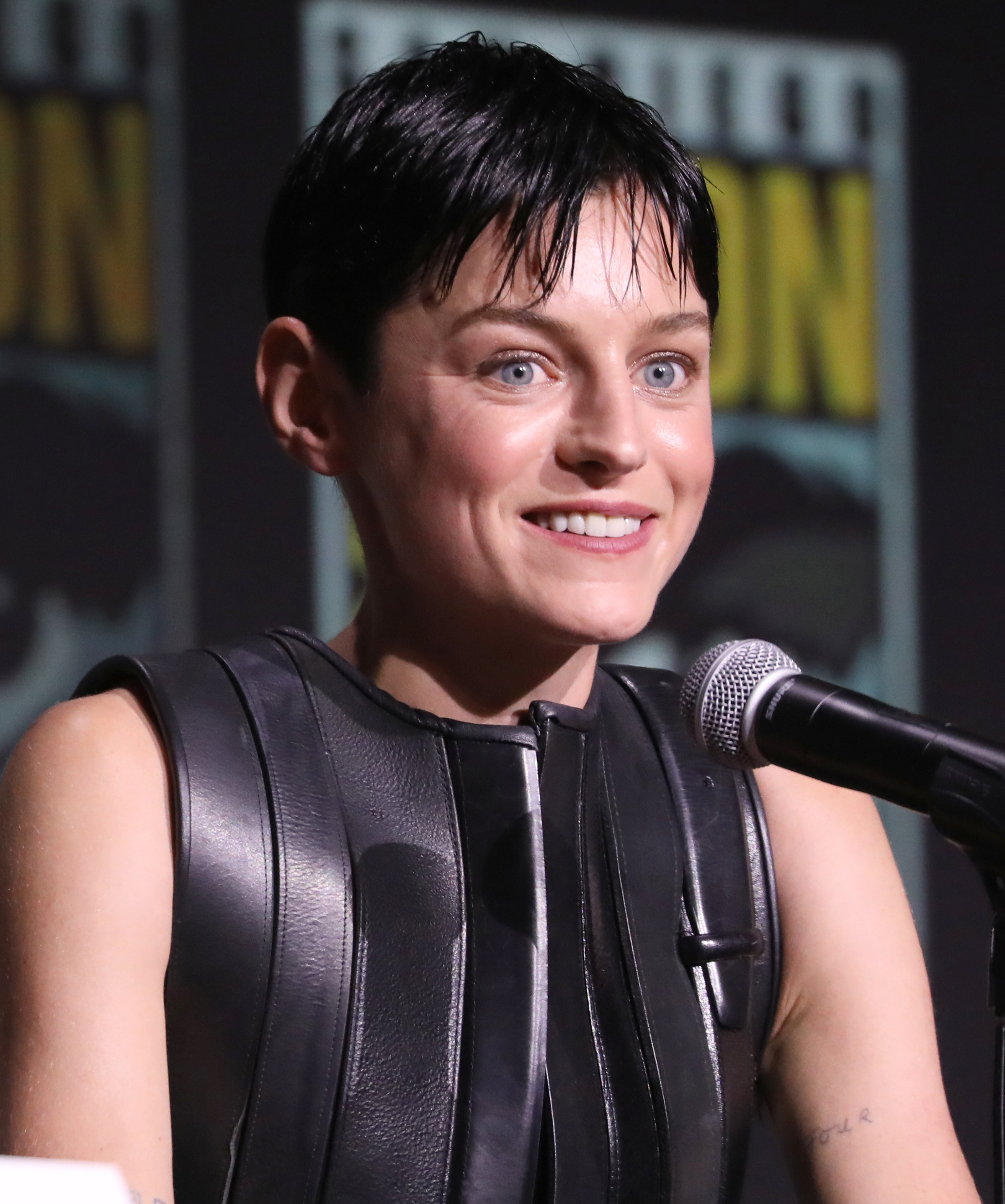
Emma Corrin portrays Cassandra Nova in Deadpool & Wolverine.

Cassandra Nova appears in Deadpool & Wolverine, portrayed by Emma Corrin. This version was banished by the Time Variance Authority to the Void and is its self-styled ruler, forcing other exiled individuals to serve her or be fed to Alioth.

=== Video games ===
- Cassandra Nova, based on her Deadpool & Wolverine incarnation, appears as a playable character in Marvel Contest of Champions.
- Cassandra Nova, based on her Deadpool & Wolverine incarnation, appears as an unlockable playable character in Marvel: Future Fight.
