= Team-up =

Collaboration between two different superheroes in a same comic book

The Shield and the Wizard met in Top Notch Comics #5. It was the first team-up between superheroes.

In superhero comic books, a team-up is a fictional crossover where two or more superheroes or superhero teams who usually do not appear together work together on a shared goal.

== Overview ==
The first team-up between characters published in different comics from the same publisher was published in 1940 by the MLJ Comics. Pep Comics #4, by Harry Shorten and Irv Novick, featured a story with the Shield, which was continued in Top Notch Comics #5, by Will Harr and Edd Ashe. In that comic, the Shield met the Wizard. Timely Comics would follow, with a team-up between Sub-Mariner and Human Torch. National Comics Publications took the team-up concept one step further and created the Justice Society of America, the first superhero group, composed of superheroes who starred their own comic books. In international comics, the Phantom teamed up with Zigomar in 1939.

The team-up was an important worldbuilding narrative device, one that allowed for the creation of a shared universe concept.

== In other media ==
- Batman: The Brave and the Bold
- Ultimate Spider-Man (TV series)
