= Archie =

- Gender: male

Origin
- Origin: Archibald

Archie or Archy is a given name, almost exclusively masculine, and a diminutive of Archibald, which is derived from the Germanic ercan, meaning "genuine", and bald, meaning "bold." It has been in use as an independent given name in the Anglosphere since the 19th century. It has increased in use in English-speaking countries in the 21st century. The name has traditionally been well-used in the United Kingdom and has also been well-used in Australia and New Zealand. It was among the top 1,000 names for boys in the United States between 1880 and 1988, but its use declined until 2018, when it was once again among the top 1,000 names for American boys. It has continued to increase in use following the 2019 birth of Prince Archie of Sussex, son of Prince Harry, Duke of Sussex and Meghan, Duchess of Sussex, who has brought attention to the name.

Notable people with this name include:

== People ==
=== Given name or nickname ===
- Archie Alexander (1888–1958), African-American mathematician, engineer, and governor of the US Virgin Islands
- Archie Baptiste (born 2005), English footballer
- Archie Barnes (born 2006), English actor
- Archie Bell (singer), (born 1944), American singer and former lead singer of Archie Bell & the Drells
- Archie Blake (mathematician) (born 1906, date of death unknown), American mathematician
- Archie Bleyer (1909–1989), American bandleader, music arranger, and record executive
- Archie Bradley (baseball) (born 1992), American baseball player
- Archie Bradley (boxer) (1897–1969), Australian boxer and rugby league player
- Archie Briden (1897–1974), Canadian ice hockey player
- Archie Brown (historian) (born 1938), British political scientist and historian
- Archie Butterley, Australian fugitive who was shot dead in 1993
- Archie Campbell (disambiguation)
- Archie Carr (1909–1987), American herpetologist and a pioneer in sea turtle conservation
- Archie Christie (1889–1962), British businessman and military officer, first husband of mystery writer Agatha Christie
- Archie Clement (1846–1866), pro-Confederate guerrilla leader during the American Civil War and later bank robber
- Archie Clement (footballer) (1901–1984), English footballer
- Archie Cochrane (1909–1988), Scottish doctor
- Archibald Cox Jr. (1912–2004), American lawyer, law professor, US Solicitor General, and special prosecutor during the Watergate scandal
- Archie Davis (born 1998), British middle-distance runner
- Archie Donahue (1917–2007), American Marine officer, flying ace and Navy Cross recipient
- Archie Gemmill (born 1947), Scottish footballer
- Archie Goodburn (born 2001), Scottish swimmer
- Archie Goodwin (disambiguation)
- Archie Green (1917–2009), American folklorist and labor rights activist
- Archie Griffin (born 1954), American footballer running back
- Archie Jewell (1888–1917), English sailor who survived the sinking of the Titanic
- Archie Kao (born 1969), Chinese-American actor
- Archie Karas (1950–2024), Greek gambler Anargyros Karabourniotis, known for turning $50 into $40 million before losing it all
- Archibald "Archie" Leach, birth name of English-born American actor Cary Grant (1904–1986)
- Archie League (1907–1986), generally considered the first air traffic controller
- Archie Macpherson (born 1937), Scottish sports broadcaster
- Archie Manners (born 1993), British magician, comedian, and television presenter
- Archie Manning (born 1949), American National Football League quarterback, father of Peyton and Eli Manning
- Archie Mayo (1891–1968), American film director, screenwriter, and actor
- Archie McCafferty, Scottish-born Australian serial killer
- Archie P. McDonald (1935–2012), American Texan historian
- Archie McLean (footballer) (1894–1971), Scottish footballer known for his contributions to the Brazilian game
- Archie McPherson (footballer) (1909–1969), Scottish footballer who played as an inside left or left half
- Archie Miller (disambiguation)
- Archie Moore (1916–1998), American world champion boxer, born Archibald Lee Wright
- Archie Norman (born 1954), British businessman and politician
- Archie Panjabi (born 1972), English actress
- Archie Renaux (born 1997), English actor and model
- Archie Roach (1956–2022), Australian singer
- Archie Shepp (born 1937), American jazz saxophonist
- Archie Simonson (1924–2018), American judge
- Archie Sin (born 1998), Hong Kong singer and actor
- Archie Smith (disambiguation)
- Prince Archie of Sussex (born 2019), British royal
- Archie Thompson (born 1978), Australian footballer

=== Surname ===
- Gus Archie (1907–1978), considered the "father of petrophysics" and developer of the eponymous Archie's law

== Animals ==
- Archie Warhol, pet dachshund of Andy Warhol and Jed Johnson

== Fictional characters ==
- Archie Andrews, main character of the Archie comics series
- Archie Andrews (puppet), ventriloquist Peter Brough's dummy
- Archie Bunker, in the television sitcoms All in the Family and Archie Bunker's Place
- Archie Carpenter, in the British soap opera Hollyoaks
- Archie Goodwin (character), assistant of the fictional detective Nero Wolfe
- Archie Johnson, in the CBS crime drama CSI: Crime Scene Investigation
- Archie Mitchell, in the BBC soap opera EastEnders
- Archie Morris, in the medical drama series ER
- Archie "Snake" Simpson, in the Degrassi franchise
- Archie (Pokémon), leader of Team Aqua in the Pokémon series
- Robot Archie, in Lion comics

== Other uses ==
A term for anti-aircraft fire used by British airmen during the First World War, see Anti-aircraft warfare
