= Publication history of Marvel Comics crossover events =

Throughout its history of publications, Marvel Comics has produced many inter-company crossover stories combining characters from different series. The following is a list of crossover events involving superheroes and characters from other series.

- "Event": (main story starts and ends in core limited series and side stories runs in multiple books)
- "Crossover": (main story starts and ends in a single or multiple ongoing books and side stories run in single or multiple books or main story can start and end with bookends and continue in multiple one-shots or ongoing books)
- "Limited Series": (main story starts and ends in single limited issue book)
- "One-Shot": (main story start and end in a single or multiple book)

== Line-wide events ==
=== 1980s ===
Secret Wars was the first modern Marvel event where a separate limited series was launched, with other tie-ins following it. After its release, Marvel started having annual crossover events where a miniseries was established for the event, which impacted most Marvel comic books.

Event	Date	Developments
Secret Wars	May 1984 – April 1985	The Beyonder kidnaps selected heroes and villains of Earth to battle on a planet of his creation.
Secret Wars II	July 1985 – March 1986	The Beyonder heads to Earth in a bid to understand humanity, creating a human form for himself in the process.

=== 1990s ===
The Infinity Trilogy is a three-event arc about the Infinity Gems. Part 2 (Infinity War) and Part 3 (Infinity Crusade) deal with the fallout of the Infinity Gauntlet: the creation of separate parts of cosmic hero Adam Warlock, Goddess, and Magus.

Event	Date	Developments
The Infinity Gauntlet	May–December 1991	Thanos uses the power of the Infinity Gems to become Supreme Being in an effort to win the heart of Mistress Death.
The Infinity War	June–November 1992	Magus, Adam Warlock's "evil side", creates evil doppelgangers of Earth's heroes to gain ultimate power.
The Infinity Crusade	June–November 1993	Goddess, Adam Warlock's "good side", recruits an army of heroes to fight her holy war.

=== 2000s ===
Event	Date	Developments
House of M	August–December 2005	The Scarlet Witch creates a world where mutants are in charge and humans are second-class citizens.: Decimation: The House of M's aftermath focuses on the ramifications of the Scarlet Witch stripping nearly all of the mutant population of their powers. It also heralded the relaunch of New Excalibur and X-Factor, and included several mini series — Son of M, Generation M, Sentinel Squad O*N*E, X-Men: Deadly Genesis, and X-Men: The 198.
Civil War	May 2006 – February 2007	Heroes are divided when the U.S. government passes the Superhuman Registration Act, forcing the heroes to either reveal their identities or become wanted fugitives.: Initiative: With Captain America dead, the world moves on. The United States government approves the creation of a unified hero program, the Fifty States Initiative.
World War Hulk	May–October 2007	Following his exile into space (New Avengers Illuminati One-Shot, 2006), Hulk returns to Earth to exact revenge on those responsible.: World War Hulk: Aftersmash: The events following World War Hulk.
Secret Invasion	April–December 2008	The remnants of the Skrull Empire have been infiltrating Earth for years, and their plans to take the world for themselves are put in motion. The New Avengers, Mighty Avengers and Thunderbolts must unite to stop them.: Dark Reign: After killing the Skrull queen Veranke, Norman Osborn is lauded as a hero for stopping the invasion, and is given the reins of a newly created H.A.M.M.E.R.. He also creates his own hero team, the Dark Avengers.

=== 2010s ===
Event	Date	Developments
Siege	January–May 2010	In the wake of Dark Reign, Norman Osborn attempts to invade Asgard, one of the last strongholds not controlled by H.A.M.M.E.R.: Heroic Age: In the aftermath of Siege, the Marvel Universe is more united than ever, with Captain America taking the post previously held by Norman Osborn.
Shadowland	July–December 2010	
Fear Itself	April–November 2011	The Serpent is sowing fear and doubt among Marvel's superheroes to use it against them.: Shattered Heroes: This event shows the ways that many superheroes continue their lives and battle new threats soon after the attack of the Serpent and his Worthy, as well as how their actions during the attack affect them now.
Avengers vs. X-Men	March–October 2012	Preceded by mini series Avengers: X-Sanction, with the return of Cable to the main Marvel Universe. Nova (Sam Alexander) alerts Earth about the coming of the Phoenix Force to Earth. The Avengers believe that the cosmic entity will destroy mankind, but the Uncanny X-Men believe it will restore mutantkind after the Decimation. A war breaks out between both groups to decide the role of Hope Summers and mutantkind. At the climax of the story, Professor X is killed.: Marvel NOW!: A number of relaunches follows Avengers vs. X-Men, and each were branded under the name "Marvel NOW!".
Infinity	August–November 2013	While the Avengers are in space to combat the Builders, Thanos attacks a now-vulnerable Earth.: All-New Marvel NOW!
AXIS	October–December 2014	Following Uncanny Avengers, the Red Skull uses the world's greatest telepath to broadcast hate.
Secret Wars (2015)	May 2015 – January 2016	Preceded by the Time Runs Out concurrent arcs in Avengers and New Avengers. The main mini series was originally solicited with 8 issues (plus a Free Comic Book Day issue #0), but later extended with a ninth extra issue. A series of Incursions between realities collides the main Marvel Universe with the Ultimate Marvel Universe, destroying both. Pieces of the two universes (called domains) are combined with other post collision universes creating the "Battleworld", where many past Marvel events are revisited in the domains. These past events include: Iron Man: Armor Wars, Incredible Hulk: Planet Hulk, Incredible Hulk: Future Imperfect, Infinity Gauntlet, X-Men: Age of Apocalypse, Civil War, Wolverine: Old Man Logan, X-Men: Inferno, Marvel Zombies, Age of Ultron, X-Men: Days of Future Past, Avengers: The Korvac Saga, House of M, The Amazing Spider-Man: Spider Island, The Amazing Spider-Man: Spider-Verse, X-Tinction Agenda, X-Men: Mutant Massacre, Marvel 1602, E Is for Extinction, Marvel 2099, Siege, One More Day, Killraven, New Warriors Forever Yesterday, Weirdworld, Avengers vs. X-Men (a Skottie Young version) and a return to the continuity of X-Men: The Animated Series with X-Men '92.: All-New, All-Different Marvel: Following the "Secret Wars" storyline, with nearly 55–60 titles relaunched with first issues.
Civil War II	May–December 2016	Preceded by Road to Civil War II. The sequel to the 2006 crossover. Ulysses Cain, an Inhuman with precognitive powers, draws the attention of the superhero community. Marvel heroes are divided about the best way to use his powers: a faction led by Captain Marvel wishes to profile future crimes and attacks before they occur, and another, siding with Iron Man, believes that punishment cannot come before the crime.: Marvel NOW 2.0
Inhumans vs X-Men	November 2016 – March 2017	After the Death of X event and the dispersal of the Terrigen mists over the Earth's atmosphere, tensions between mutants and Inhumans reach an all-time high as Beast and Iso travel the world to learn a desperate truth and both species fight for survival.: ResurrXion: In the fallout of the Inhuman–mutant war, the X-Men and Inhuman lines are relaunched with two one-shot issues entitled X-Men: Prime and Inhuman: Prime; they introduce Jean Grey, Iceman, Cable, Weapon X, Generation X, X-Men Blue, X-Men Gold, Royals, Black Bolt and Secret Warriors.
Secret Empire	April–August 2017	The Marvel Universe is under siege from within! Due to the manipulations of the Red Skull, Captain America, secretly a true believer in the cause of Hydra, uses the trust and respect he has gained over the years to a position where he can enact Hydra's ideals against the Marvel Universe and it is up to all heroes to unite against one of the greatest challenges they have ever faced. The story is preceded by Steve Rogers: Captain America, an ongoing series where Captain America's .: Generations: Generations features team-ups between current heroes and their predecessors. The series involves 10 self-contained one-shots, all of which take place in between Secret Empire #10 and Secret Empire Omega #1.; Marvel Legacy: Following the conclusion of the storyline, the initiative brings a greater focus to Marvel's core superheroes, unlike recent relaunches which gave prominence to newer and younger heroes. The relaunch began in late 2017 with the release of a one-shot titled Marvel Legacy #1. Marvel comic series reverted to their classic cumulative numbering system. The series having a Legacy numbering are Amazing Spider-Man, Avengers, Black Panther, Cable, Captain America, Captain Marvel, Daredevil, Despicable Deadpool, Doctor Strange, Falcon, Generation X, Guardians of the Galaxy, Incredible Hulk, Invincible Iron Man, Iron Fist, Luke Cage, The Mighty Thor, Peter Parker: The Spectacular Spider-Man, Punisher and Spider-Man. Marvel revived six cancelled comic book series along with their classic numbering as special one-shots: Darkhawk, Dazzler, Master of Kung Fu, Not Brand Echh, Power Pack, and Silver Sable and the Wild Pack.
Infinity Wars	August–December 2018	Following Infinity Countdown, a new enemy going by the name Requiem is searching for the Infinity Gems and no one is prepared to its true identity.: Infinity Warps
War of the Realms	April–July 2019	Thor and the heroes of the Marvel Universe must unite to stop the twisted Dark Elf Malekith and his evil armies from conquering Earth from across the Ten Realms.

=== 2020s ===
Event	Date	Developments
Empyre	July–September 2020	The Skrull and Kree races forge an alliance under the control of Hulkling, forcing the Avengers, Fantastic Four and various other heroes to unites against their invading armada.
King in Black	December 2020 – April 2021	The sequel to Absolute Carnage. Knull, the god and creator of the symbiotes, comes to Earth with a horde of symbiotes. Barely reeling from a Cotati invasion in Empyre, the Avengers, Fantastic Four, Venom and other Marvel heroes join forces to resist the alien army.
Heroes Reborn	May–June 2021	Something strange has happened to the Marvel Universe. Welcome to a world where the Avengers never were! Heroes and Villains are now mashed together and the world is protected by the Squadron Supreme of America. What happened? And why is it only Blade remembers the world that was before?
Devil's Reign	December 2021 – May 2022	Wilson Fisk goes from Kingpin to mayor of New York City, and brings his full criminal and political power to bear on the super heroes who live in it. The man who once destroyed Daredevil has set his sights on The Fantastic Four, Iron Man, Captain America, Spider-Man, Jessica Jones, Luke Cage and more.
Judgment Day	July–November 2022	The Avengers are caught in a conflict between the X-Men and the Eternals while the Primordial Celestial known as the Progenitor decides to judge humanity for their selfish deeds.
Blood Hunt	May–July 2024	The rise of the Vampire Nation united by a single vision for the first time in millennia.
One World Under Doom	February–November 2025	Doctor Doom becomes the Sorcerer Supreme and creates a new reality declaring himself Emperor of the World as the ruler of a new United Latveria.
Queen in Black	July-November 2026	Hela seizes power from Knull, the former King in Black, and becomes the Queen in Black.

== Major events/storylines ==
=== 1960s ===
Event	Date	Type	Developments
Sub-Mariner's Quest for Krang	1966	Crossover	Krang wages war and Dorma leaves with him in order to save Namor, not knowing the reason he declares Dorma a traitor and goes after her, battling Iron Man along the way. The story started in the pages of Tales to Astonish #79–87, and ended up being referenced in the pages of Avengers. The Namor vs Iron Man story was told in Tales of Suspense #79–80, and finishes inTales to Astonish #82, the first time a story had begun and finished in two different titles.
Daredevil–Dr Doom Swap	1968	Crossover	Involved Daredevil, the Fantastic Four, Thor, Spider-Man.
Terrible Trio	1969	Crossover	A plot by Egghead, The Thinker, and Puppet Master to take over the world.
Formation of the Defenders	1969–1970	Crossover	The future Defenders stop a plot by the Undying Ones. Barbara Norriss, future alter ego of the Valkyrie, also appears.

=== 1970s ===
Event	Date	Type	Developments
Mr. Kline War	1971–1972	Crossover	A plot by Mister Kline.
Thanos War	1973–1974	Crossover	Captain Marvel's attempts to thwart Thanos' mad plot to achieve supremacy with the Cosmic Cube.
They Who Wield Power	1974–1979	Crossover	Tyrannus Keeper of the Flame, and Prince Rey use the Sacred Flame of Life in order to take over the world and gain Immortality.
The Private War of Doctor Doom	1976–1977	Crossover	Doctor Doom conscripts the Avengers in his war with Attuma the Warlord.
Corporation	1977–1979	Crossover	The corporation was a nationwide criminal and political manipulating organization. They used blackmail, kidnapping, murder, narcotic sales, and terrorism to gain money and power.

=== 1980s ===
Event	Date	Type	Developments
Marvel Super Hero Contest of Champions	June–August 1982	Limited Series	The Grandmaster and Death manipulate the heroes of Earth in a game to decide the fate of the Collector.
The Evolutionary War	September 1988	Crossover	The High Evolutionary unleashes attacks all over the world to guide the way of human evolution.
Saga of the Serpent Crown; Atlantis Attacks	1989	Crossover	The disembodied Ghaur baits Silver Surfer into restoring his physical form by hijacking Surfer's surfboard. After a brief battle, Ghaur escapes and flees to Earth, where he convinces Lemuria's ruler, Llyra, to form an alliance to summon Set back to Earth.
Inferno	October 1988 – March 1989	Crossover	Demons from Limbo invade earth, summoned by Madelyne Pryor. Resolution to long-standing X-books plots: the fate of Magik (Illyana Rasputin) and the revelations of Pryor as a clone of Jean Grey.
Acts of Vengeance	December 1989 – February 1990	Crossover	Loki unites Doctor Doom, Magneto, Kingpin, Mandarin, Wizard, and Red Skull in a plot to use lesser enemies to defeat the superheroes that aren't their usual enemies.

=== 1990s ===
Event	Date	Type	Developments
Kings of Pain	June 1991	Crossover	The X-Force and the New Warriors joined forces to stop the terrorist organization A.I.M. and Genetech Corporation from resurrecting the powerful reality-altering mutant Proteus.
Return of the Defenders	July 1992	Crossover	The original non-team super hero team come together to battle The Wild One.
Dead Man's Hand	August–October 1992	Crossover	After Kingpin's apparent death, many factions of New York's criminal underworld seek to seize control of the crime lord's vast empire and redistribute its spoils.
Rise of the Midnight Sons	August–November 1992	Crossover	Horror-based heroes of the Marvel Universe unite against Lilith. This launched the new series Ghost Rider/Blaze: Spirits of Vengeance, Morbius: The Living Vampire, Darkhold: Pages from the Book of Sins and the Nightstalkers.
MyS-TECH Wars	March–June 1993	Crossover	Mixing arcane magic and technology, secret organization Mys-Tech create a duplicate version of Earth called Unearth in a bid to take control of the planet while coordinating a demonic invasion. Earth's mightiest heroes (the Avengers, Fantastic Four and X-Men) join forces to repel the invasion and take the fight back to MyS-Tech. Crossover with Marvel UK Imprint books.
For Love Nor Money	May–July 1993	Crossover	Luke Cage, Terror and Silver Sable compete with each other in the quest of Vatsayana's Tryst, each looking for it for their own reasons.
Blood and Thunder	November 1993 – February 1994	Crossover	Thor's gone completely insane, and it will take the combined might of the Infinity Watch, Silver Surfer, and Thanos to subdue him.
Starblast	January–April 1994	Crossover	This crossover shows two concurrent storylines: the first one follows Quasar in outer space; the second one focuses on events on Earth.
Siege of Darkness	December 1993 – January 1994	Crossover	Sequel to the Rise of the Midnight Sons crossover.
Child's Play	March–April 1994	Crossover	Prompted by games and gambling aficionado Gamesmaster, the New Warriors and X-Force join forces in a power play against the Upstarts. Features the return of Karma to the X-books, after her departure back in New Mutants #54 (1987).
Hands of the Mandarin	December 1994 – January 1995	Crossover	Iron Man and War Machine team-up to stop The Mandarin
Over the Edge	August–October 1995	Crossover	Punisher is brainwashed to kill Nick Fury.
Onslaught Saga	August 1996 – October 1998	Event	The seed was planted when Xavier mind-wiped Magneto during Fatal Attractions, and he was born by the time warp of the Age of Apocalypse. Onslaught has arrived and defeating him results in the apparent "deaths" of many superheroes. (X-Men #53, June 1996, Onslaught: X-Men Special, August 1996, Onslaught: Marvel Universe, October 1996). This leads to a relaunch of Fantastic Four, Iron Man, Captain America and Avengers.: Heroes Reborn
Flashback	July 1997	One-Shots	The Flashback Month was a publishing event in July 1997.
Siege of Wundagore	September–October 1998	Crossover	The High Evolutionary wants the scientific citadel on Wundagore Mountain back from Exodus and his Acolytes with the help of the Knights of Wundagore and the Heroes for Hire.
Eighth Day	August–September 1999	Crossover	Farallah, Cyttorak, Balthakk, Ikonn, Raggadorr, Watoomb, Valtorr, and Krakkan. Each of them created a totem which held a fraction of their vast power, and would transform the first human who touched into an exemplar, a living embodiment of that power.
Contest of Champions II	September–November 1999	Limited Series	The greatest heroes of the Marvel Universe go to war, with each other, in this all-new super slugfest! From deep space comes the Coiterie, a group of intergalactic samaritans who come to Earth seeking its most powerful champion, through all-out combat! But what could possibly make our heroes compete against one another? How about this: the victor receives a miraculous wish of their choice! In other words, the winner could once and for all save mankind! But as Wolverine, Spider-Man, the Thing, Rogue, Thor, Hulk and a legion of heroes are culled from the Avengers, Fantastic Four and the X-Men, the participants begin to wonder: could their alien hosts really have a more sinister agenda?! They better figure it out soon, before they take each other out!

=== 2000s ===
Event	Date	Type	Developments
Maximum Security	November 2000 – January 2001	Event	Fed up with Earth's interference in intergalactic affairs, the starfaring alien community quarantines the Sol System and turns Earth into a prison for the universe's worst criminals.
Infinity Abyss	August–October 2002	Limited Series	Mad partial-clones of Thanos try to destroy the universe.
The End	2002–2007, 2009–2010, 2020	One-Shots and Limited Series	The End is a series of comic book series depicting various interpretations of the end of the Marvel Universe.
Secret War	April 2004 – December 2005	Limited Series	In 2003, Nick Fury, Director of the international security force S.H.I.E.L.D., uncovers a secret plot by Latverian Prime Minister Lucia von Bardas to fund a group of B-list supervillains with advanced technology. Fury recruits Captain America, Spider-Man, Daredevil, Black Widow, Luke Cage, Wolverine, and superhuman S.H.I.E.L.D. agent Daisy Johnson in a private attempt to covertly overthrow Latveria.
Enemy of the State	December 2004 – April 2005	Crossover	Wolverine vowed to dismantle Hydra and the Hand for what they did to him and for what they made him do while the New Thunderbolts and Invaders are caught in the middle of a civil war within Hydra.
Wild Kingdom	November–December 2005	Crossover	Strange mutated animals reported roaming wild near Wakanda. The X-Men join forces with Black Panther to investigate.
Captain Universe	January 2006	Crossover	Five Marvel heroes are selected by the Enigma Force to become Captain Universe
Annihilation	May 2006 – March 2007	Event	Silver Surfer, Super-Skrull, Nova, and Ronan face the Annihilation Wave, led by Annihilus of the Negative Zone (Fantastic Four's enemy). Continues into Annihilation: Conquest.
Silent War	March–August 2007	Limited Series	After Son of M, Quicksilver stole the Terrigen Crystal from the Inhumans and now Black Bolt declares war on humanity.
Mystic Arcana	August 2007–January 2008	EventOne–Shots	Each story in each book focuses on a different magic character
Annihilation: Conquest	January–April 2008	Event	After the devastation of the wake of the Annihilation Wave, Nova, Star Lord, Wraith, and a new Quasar (Phyla-Vell) lead a group of cosmic heroes against the Phalanx, who threaten to conquer and annihilate all of Kree space.
War of Kings	January–August 2009	Event	Vulcan is rapidly expanding the Shi'ar Empire, while Black Bolt and the Inhumans become leaders of the Kree empire following the events of "Secret Invasion", and a cosmic war begins, drawing in Nova, Darkhawk, the Starjammers, and the Guardians of the Galaxy.
Magnum Opus	April–May 2009	Crossover	Part of Dark Reign
Dark Reign: The List	September–November 2009	One-Shots	Part of the Dark Reigns saga. Norman Osborn made a "to do list", planning to kill or neutralize heroes that pose threats to his political power.
Realm of Kings	November 2009 – March 2010	Crossover	The follow-up to War of Kings. When Black Bolt and Vulcan were apparently killed in a massive explosion during the War of Kings, the great eruption of energy ripped a giant hole in the fabric of space and time, creating what is now known as the "'Fault'".
Fall of the Hulks	December 2009 – May 2010	Event	The smartest minds in the Marvel Universe are being captured by a group known only as the Intelligencia, a collection of some of the smartest supervillains in the Marvel canon.

=== 2010s ===
Event	Date	Type	Developments
World War Hulks	April–August 2010	Crossover	The follow-up to Fall of the Hulks. The plan of the Intelligencia is put in action plus the identities of the Red Hulk and Red She-Hulk are finally revealed.
The Thanos Imperative	May 2010 – January 2011	Crossover	The Realm of Kings follow-up.
Punishment	July–September 2010	Crossover	A monstrous Punisher sought revenge on Daken after the events of Dark Reign.
Chaos War	October–December 2010	Event	The Chaos King Amatsu-Mikaboshi has chosen to annihilate all reality and to return the Marvel Universe back to its state of primordial darkness, thus launching a massive assault on Earth to wipe out all of existence with an army of thousands of alien deities at his back. This forces the remaining heroes, gods and cosmic beings, rallied by a restored Hercules, to join forces in a last desperate effort to stop him.
Escape from the Negative Zone	March–May 2011	Crossover	Steve Rogers helps Cyclops, Hope, Doctor Nemesis and Namor escape from the Negative Zone after being stranded there while trying to find a new means of entry to Limbo.
Exiled	May 2012	Crossover	After the events of Fear Itself, the New Mutants have further entwined their destiny with Asgard. As a forgotten hero more powerful than Thor himself returns, the team must brace themselves for matters that will pit member against member.
Inhumanity	December 2013 – January 2014	Event	The Marvel Universe must deal with the consequences of Infinity as brand new Inhumans are created due to Black Bolt releasing the Terrigen Mists on a global scale.
Revolutionary War	January–March 2014	Crossover	The UK's greatest heroes come together to face a threat that could destroy the world.
The Trial of Jean Grey	January–March 2014	Crossover	The Guardians of the Galaxy and the All-New X-Men must team up to save Jean Grey after her capture and trial by the Shi'ar empire for her supposed crimes as the Phoenix.
Death of Wolverine	September–October 2014	Event	Without the aid of his healing factor, Wolverine fights a losing battle to the death as he looks back on his life. The mini series is preceded by Three Months to Die.
The Black Vortex	February–April 2015	Crossover	Star–Lord and Kitty Pryde have stolen the ancient Black Vortex, which offers cosmic power to anyone who peers within. Peter's father, the deposed emperor J'son, wants it–and so does the son of Thanos. Could this dark mirror deliver unto Thane the Mad Titan's full legacy? To keep their prize safe from mounting threats, Peter and Kitty will need all their allies–including Captain Marvel, Nova and the time–torn original X-Men.
Monsters Unleashed	January–March 2017	Event	The storyline is self contained in a five standalone special issue series but several monthly titles tie-in with it, with each issue gaining the suffix .MU attached.
Weapons of Mutant Destruction	June–August 2017	Crossover	The mysterious director of the Weapon X program has a very specific mission in mind and it involves the Hulk. Amadeus Cho teams up with the team led by Old Man Logan to fight the new incarnation of Weapon X exterminating mutants. The event began with the Weapons of Mutant Destruction: Alpha issue and continued in the books Totally Awesome Hulk and Weapon X.
Damnation	February–April 2018	Event	In a follow-up of Secret Empire, Doctor Strange uses his magic to restore the lives that were lost during Hydra's attack on Las Vegas, but it attracts the attention of Mephisto and other demons. While the main story occurs in the four issues limited series of the same name, issues of Ben Reilly: Scarlet Spider, Doctor Strange, Iron Fist, and Johnny Blaze: Ghost Rider tie-in with the storyline.
Infinity Countdown	March–July 2018	Event	This storyline depicts the Ultron/Hank Pym going after the Infinity Gems that were recreated when the Multiverse was restored. To be continued in Infinity Wars.
Hunt for Wolverine	April–August 2018	Crossover	
Secret Warps	July 2019	One-Shots	Spinning-out of Infinity Wars and Infinity Warps, the Soul Stone developed a Multiverse of its own, and the warped heroes must save their reality before it is erased from existence.
Acts of Evil	July–September 2019	One-Shots	A series of annuals featuring heroes of the Marvel Universe taking on villains that they have never taken on before.
Annihilation Scourge	November–December 2019	Crossover	

=== 2020s ===
Event	Date	Type	Developments
Iron Man 2020	January–August 2020	Event	Several robots that gained sentience are asking for their own rights, but no human is interested, especially Arno Stark. So when Mark One–the revived Tony Stark through artificial intelligence in an artificial construct–has decided to declare a revolution, it leads into a war between robots and humans.
Infinite Destinies	June–September 2021	Crossover	Marvel heroes prevent the Infinity Gems from falling on the wrong hands told in a series of annuals.: Infinity Score: The conclusion of the story in as arc of Black Cat.
United States of Captain America	June–October 2021	Limited Series	Steve Rogers and Sam Wilson set out to find the thief who stole Captain America's shield and to protect the Captains Network.
Last Annihilation	July–September 2021	Crossover	The Guardians of the Galaxy, Emperor Hulkling and Wiccan, helped by Storm and the mutant team S.W.O.R.D., face off Dormammu, who has bonded himself with Ego the Living Planet.
Darkhold	September 2021	Crossover	Scarlet Witch gathers the Marvel Universe's greatest heroes to unleash their inner darkness in order to defeat the elder god Chthon who has found the Book of the Damned
Death of Doctor Strange	September–January 2021	Event	Doctor Strange is killed, can the heroes of Marvel Universe solve the case by find the killer and save the world without the Sorcerer Supreme.
Reckoning War	February–July 2022	Event	The Reckoning, a group of aliens derived from a mysterious race called the Prosilicans, orchestrate a cosmic war.
Banner of War	April–June 2022	Crossover	Five-part crossover showdown between the Thor and Hulk, celebrating the 60th anniversary of both characters.
Dark Web	November 2022 – February 2023	Crossover	Spider-Man and the X-Men joining forces against Ben Reilly and Madelyne Pryor as the two wronged clones are teaming up as Chasm and Goblin Queen to raise hell across the Marvel Universe.
Contest of Chaos	August–September 2023	Crossover	A rejuvenated Agatha Harkness' quest to bring Chaos magic pits the heroes of Marvel Universe in a mystically charged challenge.
Weapons of Vengeance	August 2023	Crossover	Wolverine and Ghost Rider investigate the possibility of a new Weapons Plus program—one that experiments and specializes in the arsenal of Hell.
Infinity Watch	June–September 2024	Crossover	Thanos' renewed quest to hunt down the Infinity Gems after learning they were bonded to their bearer.
Venom War	August–November 2024	Event	The fateful confrontation between Eddie Brock and his son Dylan realizing only one of them can be Venom after going on separate journeys.
Imperial	June–October 2025	Event	A sweeping Marvel cosmic event resets the balance of power in the Marvel Universe

== Avengers crossovers/storylines ==
=== 1970s ===
Event	Date	Type	Developments
Kree–Skrull War	June 1971 – March 1972	Crossover	Earth is caught up in the war between Kree and Skrulls. Involves Avengers, Fantastic Four, Captain Marvel and the Inhumans.
Avengers/Defenders War	September–December 1973	Crossover	A plot by Loki and Dormammu. Most of Marvel's heroes featured in the last chapter.
The Korvac Saga	January–November 1978	Crossover	The Avengers and the Guardians of the Galaxy face–off against Korvac.

=== 1980s ===
Event	Date	Type	Developments
Lost in Space–Time	February–September 1987	Story Series	The West Coast Avengers have to deal with time travel.

=== 1990s ===
Event	Date	Type	Developments
Operation: Galactic Storm	March–May 1992	Crossover	The Avengers become involved in a war between the Kree and the Shi'ar.
Bloodties	November–December 1993	Crossover	In the fallout from Charles Xavier's mindwipe of Magneto in Fatal Attractions, Exodus kidnaps Luna, Magneto's grandchild and Quicksilver's daughter, and takes her to Genosha.

=== 2000s ===
Event	Date	Type	Developments
Nefaria Protocols	June–November 2000	Crossover	The Thunderbolts and the Avengers work together to battle Count Nefaria.
Kang Dynasty	June 2001 – July 2002	Story Series	Earth have been conquered Kang the Conqueror with his son Marcus, also known as Scarlet Centurion. Although Kang is temporarily successful, the first villain in Marvel Comics to physically take over the world, he is opposed and eventually defeated by the Avengers.
Celestial Quest	November 2001 – June 2002	Limited Series	Mantis sends out a space–spanning SOS that's received by the Vision, the Avengers' resident android gathers an elite squad of heroes to come to her rescue.
Avengers Disassembled	September 2004 – January 2005	Crossover	Scarlet Witch uses her powers to attack the Avengers physically and psychologically, resulting in the death of Vision, Ant-Man (Scott Lang) and Hawkeye (Clint Barton) and the Avengers disbanding, setting the stage for the franchise being relaunched as New Avengers. Meanwhile, Thor brings about the end of Asgard. Leads to a cancellation and relaunch of Avengers titles. Sequels to it are "House of M" and "Avengers: The Children's Crusade".
Sidekicks	April 2005	Story Series	After Avengers Disassembled, the Young Avengers are assembled to take the place of the Avengers.
Fallen Son: The Death of Captain America	April 2007 – November 2008	Limited Series	In the aftermath of Civil War, Captain America is taken into S.H.I.E.L.D. Shortly afterward, he is assassinated by Sharon Carter. Various characters—including Wolverine, Avengers, Spider-Man, and Iron Man—reflect on his death and how his death changes the Marvel Universe.

=== 2010s ===
Event	Date	Type	Developments
Avengers: The Children's Crusade	July 2010 – March 2012	Limited Series	Helmed by Allan Heinberg and Jimmy Cheung, the mini series leads to the return of Scarlet Witch, who is sought after by different parties, for their own interests: the Avengers, Young Avengers, Magneto and Doctor Doom.
Avengers: X-Sanction	December 2011 – March 2012	Limited Series	This is set up for Avengers vs. X-Men event.
Avengers Origins	January 2012	One-Shots	Marvel Comics presents the origins of the Avengers
End Times	October–November 2012	Story Series	After Avengers vs. X-Men, an Emergency Signal leads the Avengers to the Microverse, where they find a safe and sound Janet van Dyne (Wasp) - presumed dead during "Secret Invasion". Meanwhile, Daniel Drumm (Brother Voodoo) enacts his revenge for his brother's death.
Avengers Arena	December 2012 – November 2013	Limited Series	Part of the Marvel NOW!. Long-term Marvel villain, Arcade put 16 teenage heroes in a Battle Royale–style survival competition on a new, deadlier Murderworld. Avengers Undercover is a sequel series following the survivors of Murderworld. Part of the "All-New Marvel NOW!".
Age of Ultron	March–June 2013	Event	For years, Marvel Heroes feared that Hank Pym's artificial intelligence Ultron will one day return and exterminate everything. That day has come, and the fate of the world now rests in the hands of Wolverine and Invisible Woman.
The Enemy Within	May–July 2013	Crossover	Vicious echoes of the Avengers' past are cropping up all over Manhattan... and a grounded Captain Marvel refuses to be left behind.Who is the sinister figure behind these incursions and what does it have to do with Carol Danvers' mysterious condition?
Original Sin	April–October 2014	Event	The Watcher has been murdered. Now it is up to Marvel Universe heroes to find the killer. Many secrets hidden from heroes will be revealed that will have ramifications on many of them.
Time Runs Out	September 2014 – April 2015	Crossover	In September 2014 Avengers #34 and #35 time jump ahead by 8 months where it's said (via Bleeding Cool): Time Runs Out sees everything Jonathan Hickman has been building towards comes to a close and affects the entire Marvel company across the board, forcing them to do something the company has never done in its 75 years, rebooting the Marvel Universe. Though the series is restricted to the two titles, Avengers World has a storyline called Before Time Runs Out to help catch up readers with how the events of Time Runs Out happened. The Time Runs Out event is a direct prelude to Secret Wars.
Ultron Forever	April–May 2015	One-Shots	A group of Avengers one-shots published in the Spring of 2015 and presented here in order of release these comics
Avengers: Rage of Ultron	April 2015	One-Shot	The Avengers confront Ultron, who has taken over Titan.
Avengers (2015)	October 2015	One-Shot Series Release	After Secret Wars event, this One-shot is part of All-New, All-Different Marvel that released the series: New Avengers Vol 4, Squadron Supreme vol 4, Uncanny Avengers Vol 3, A–Force Vol 2, Ultimates Vol 2, All-New, All-Different Avengers vol 1, Scalet Witch vol 2 and Vision vol 2.
Avengers: Standoff!	March–April 2016	Stories Series	
Worlds Collide	October–December 2017	Crossover	Following the events of Generations comes the long-promised clash between the Avengers and the Champions. The countdown has started as the High Evolutionary, a twisted scientist determined to create a better world at all costs, sets the Earth on a collision course with destruction! The Avengers and the Champions are ready to meet this threat — but will their first cataclysmic clash deter them from changing the world?
Avengers: No Surrender	January–April 2018	Story Series	When the Earth is taken by mysterious forces, the planet's only hope is the Avengers, Avengers Unity Division, the U.S.Avengers, and the mysterious Voyager, who claims to be an original member of the Avengers.: Fresh Start: The relaunch saw the return of Tony Stark, Steve Rogers, Logan, Odinson and Bruce Banner to their classic identities of Iron Man, Captain America, Wolverine, Thor and Hulk respectively. All those characters had been replaced by legacy heroes in recent times.; Avengers: No Road Home: The team that brought you AVENGERS: NO SURRENDER REUNITES for an all-new weekly AVENGERS adventure! Night has fallen across the universe. Now seven Avengers — and one new addition — journey forth to bring back the light. But when the threat they face has destroyed even the gods... will anyone make it home?
Avengers World Tour	September–December 2018	Story Series	After defeated Loki and the Celestials, earth's mightiest heroes have a new headquarter Avengers Mountain but dealing with an old friend.
Avengers: Back To Basics	March–May 2018	Limited Series	Darkness is coming, and with it, a terrible and ancient danger. Can Earth's Mightiest Heroes avert Ragnarok, or will the servants of death prove triumphant?

=== 2020s ===
Event	Date	Type	Developments
Avengers Assemble	November 2022	Event	The biggest Avengers saga in Marvel history uniting Avengers, Avengers Forever, and Avengers of 1,000,000 B.C.
Tribulation Event	May 2023	Event	With Kang defeated by Myrrdin and his Twilight Court in Timeless, the Avengers regroup and prove themselves why they are the Earth's mightiest heroes while facing a new threat known as the Tribulation Events.
Avengers: Armageddon	June 2026	Limited Series	TBA

== X-Men crossovers/storylines ==
As X-Men popularity grew in the 1980s, Marvel started doing crossovers between X-Men books, usually dubbed X-Overs.

=== 1980s ===
Event	Date	Type	Developments
The Dark Phoenix Saga	January–October 1980	Story Arc	Jean Grey, reborn as The Phoenix by a powerful cosmic force, is manipulated into evil by Mastermind and the Hellfire Club. The Phoenix Force becomes the Dark Phoenix and consumes the power of a star and destroys an entire solar system before sacrificing herself to save the universe from mass destruction.
Days of Future Past	January–February 1981	Story Series	The future is bleak for mutants as the mutant-killing machines known as Sentinels kill most of Earth's mutants and imprison the few remaining. This story marks the debut of Rachel Summers.
Mutant Massacre	October 1986 – January 1987	Crossover	Primarily involving the superhero teams the X-Men, X-Factor and the New Mutants. Power Pack, Thor, and Daredevil crossed over for an issue in their own comic books. The sewer dwelling mutant community of the Morlocks suffer multiple casualties in the hands of the Marauders, a mercenary team of murderous mutants.
Fall of the Mutants	January–March 1988	Crossover	This "thematic crossover" involved primarily the three X-Men titles (Uncanny X-Men, New Mutants and X-Factor). The X-Men are slain in Dallas during a cataclysmic battle against the Adversary. Cypher dies battling the Ani-Mator. The X-Factor team battles Apocalypse and his Four Horsemen.
The Cross-Time Caper	September 1989 – July 1990	Story Arc	The Cross-Time Caper was a 12-issue story arc beginning in Excalibur #12 and ending in Excalibur #24 featuring the team's epic journey through incredible alternate dimensions.

=== 1990s ===
Event	Date	Type	Developments
Days of Future Present	July 1990	Story Series	In the possible future in Days of Future Past, the future overrun by sentinels but also by the mutant-hunter Ahab.: Tribute: A series of annual tributes to characters who have died over the years such as Jean Grey, Cypher, Destiny and Jenskot.
X-Tinction Agenda	November 1990 – January 1991	Story Series	The Genoshan government captures the New Mutants and the X-Men to trial them for their previous crimes against the island. After their escape, the X-Men and mutant allies overthrow the Genoshan government (Story arc begins in The Uncanny X-Men #270, November 1990).
Muir Island Saga	July–September 1991	Story Series	A five-part Marvel Comics crossover event involving the Uncanny X-Men and X-Factor, published in 1991 and written by Chris Claremont and Fabian Nicieza. The Shadow King dominates Muir Island on the Atlantic Ocean and uses it as his personal playground, with Xavier's son, Legion, as his host. Leads to the return of the Original Five to the X-Men and a change of teams.
X-Cutioner's Song	November 1992 – February 1993	Story Series	Stryfe arrives in the present to take vengeance against Cable and the X-Men by capturing his parents Cyclops and Jean Grey. Long-running 90s storyline of the X-books, the Legacy Virus is released during its epilogue. (Story arc begins in Uncanny X-Men #294, November 1992).
Fatal Attractions	1993	Story Series	Magneto returns more powerful and determined than ever, ripping the adamantium from Wolverine's bones and enraging Professor X. Colossus defects to Magneto's side. (Story arc begins in X-Factor #92, July 1993).
Phalanx Covenant	1994	Story Series	The Phalanx race attacks Earth. Generation X is founded in its aftermath.
Legion Quest	1994–1995	Story Series	Legion travels back in time to kill Magneto, but accidentally kills his own father, Charles Xavier.
Age of Apocalypse	1995–1996	Event	A dystopian alternative timeline in which Apocalypse rules the world is created after Legion inadvertently killed his own father. During the entirety of the event the regularly published X-Men comics were replaced by new X-Men related mini series, focusing on various teams and individuals in the Age of Apocalypse world including X-Calibre, Gambit and the X-Ternals, Generation Next, Astonishing X-Men, Amazing X-Men, Weapon X, Factor X, X-Man and X-Universe. The event was bookended by two one shots, X-Men Alpha and X-Men Omega. An Age of Apocalypse one-shot and miniseries to celebrate the 10th anniversary of the fan-favorite event.
Operation: Zero Tolerance	June–November 1997	Crossover	The story followed from the Onslaught Saga and focused on individuals within the United States government, including Bastion and Henry Peter Gyrich, and their attempts to use their positions to hunt down all mutants across the country.
The Hunt for Xavier	December 1998 – February 1999	Story Series	The X-Men attempt to find the location of Professor Xavier, who has been missing ever since the authorities arrested him in the wake of the Onslaught Saga disaster.
Blood Brothers	December 1998 – January 1999	Story Series	Cable and Madelyne team up to save X-Man from Stryfe who returns to kill every telepath in the world.
The Magneto War	March–April 1999	Story Series	* Limited series Magneto Rex shows Magneto's attempts to consolidate his position on the island.
Shattering	September–December 1999	Story Series	Professor X disbands the X-Men as part of an elaborate ruse to root out an impostor among them.

=== 2000s ===
Event	Date	Type	Developments
The Twelve	January–February 2000	Crossover	Apocalypse emerges with a new set of Horsemen, aiming to fulfill a mysterious prophecy of 12 powerful mutants. Resolution of the decades long "The Twelve" plot.: Ages of Apocalypse: failing to possess Nate Grey's powers, En Sabah Nur finds himself trapped in the body of Scott Summers. As a last gasp, he traps The Twelve and other mutants in alternate reality scenarios.
Dream's End	January 2001	Story Series	Mystique reforms the Brotherhood of Mutants to enact a new plan to kill Senator Robert Kelly, armed with a new strain of the Legacy Virus, modified to target humans. This storyline killed off long-standing X-Men characters Moira MacTaggert, Robert Kelly, and Pyro.
Eve of Destruction	April–June 2001	Story Series	A cure for the Legacy Virus has been released, providing Magneto with a brand new army of healthy mutants ready to wage a final battle against humanity. This serves as a finale to the more traditionalist, old–school X-Men storylines leading to a reorganization of the X-Men titles.
Riot at Xavier's	February–May 2003	Story Arc	Kid Omega is causing chaos at the school.
The Underground	April–November 2003	Story Arc	Cable led a new team called the "Underground " to destroy the Director's evil plans and make sure that the Weapon X program never happens again.
Planet X	November 2003 – February 2004	Story Arc	Once believed to be dead, Magneto, the X-Men's greatest adversary, has instead been hiding, waiting to make a move against the team that has thwarted his plans again and again.
District X	July 2004 – August 2005	Story Arc	X-Man and Bishop joins forces with human police officer Ismael Ortega to patrol the mutant population of New York's district X.
Gifted	July–December 2004	Story Arc	Joss Whedon's first foray into the X-books: Indian scientist Dr. Kavita Rao introduces a "mutant cure" designed by Benetech. Unbeknownst to the world at large, the scientist was secretly sponsored by warrior alien Ord.
Phoenix Endsong	January–April 2005	Limited Series	Shi'ar revive the Phoenix Force and it resurrects Jean Grey and decided what to do next.
Deadly Genesis	November 2005 – May 2006	Limited Series	Mini series published as celebration of the 30th anniversary of Giant-Size X-Men #1. After House of M, Professor X went missing. Now, the X-Men are looking for him, all the while revolving long buried secrets of their disastrous Krakoa mission.
Rise & Fall of the Shi'ar Empire	September 2006 – July 2007	Story Arc	Vulcan (Cyclops' and Havok's long lost brother) wreaks havoc in Shi'ar Space on his hunt for his mother's killer, fallen emperor D'Ken. Xavier assembles a new team to reach the Shi'ar Empire and stop Vulcan's path of destruction.
Endangered Species	June–December 2007	Story Series	Following up on the events of House of M and Decimation, Beast tries to find an explanation for the dwindling numbers of the mutant species, and why some mutants have retained their superpowers. Leads directly to Messiah CompleX.
Emperor Vulcan	September 2007 – January 2008	Limited Series	The next chapter in the saga of Emperor Vulcan: the Shi'ar Empire faces a forgotten species that wants to annihilate it. The Starjammers forge a shaky alliance with the Empire, which, at the end of the conflict, leads to the capture of Havok and Polaris by Vulcan.
Messiah CompleX	December 2007 – March 2008	Story Series	The birth of the first child with the X-gene since Decimation sparks a race between the X-Men, the Marauders, the Acolytes, the Reavers, the Purifiers, and Predator X to see who will find the child first. Bishop turns rogue in an attempt to assassinate the child who he believes will cause his dystopian future to occur. It is followed by Messiah War.: Divided We Stand: Reeling from the events of Messiah CompleX, the surviving mutants reassess Xavier's dream amidst the rubble of the mansion.; Manifest Destiny: The X-Men shift their base from Westchester to San Francisco.
X-Men: Original Sin	November 2008 – January 2009	Story Series	Wolverine, the man who recently learned his past, and Professor Xavier, who has been trying to piece together the fragments of his past, are two of the oldest fighters in mutantkind's struggle for equality; men with long histories and much blood on their hands. Now, they've joined forces to save Wolverine's son, Daken, from the machinations of Sebastian Shaw and Miss Sinister.
Messiah War	April–June 2009	Story Series	Learning that Bishop was after Cable and the first mutant born since House of M, Cyclops had Beast develop time travelling devices so Cyclops could send his secret wetworks team, X-Force (consisting of Wolverine, Warpath, X-23, Domino, Vanisher, Archangel and Elixir), into the future after Bishop, hoping that they'll end the threat once and for all and the future of mutantkind will be safe in the hands of his son.
Utopia	July–September 2009	Crossover	Norman Osborn forms the Dark X-Men to deal with anti-mutant riots and captures/tortures Beast and Professor X. Unwilling to tolerate Osborn's evil scheme to harm her teammates, Emma Frost and Namor, the Sub-Mariner, plot a coup against Osborn while Cyclops attempts to create a new safe haven for mutantkind by way of creating an island paradise.: Nation X: After the events of Utopia, the X-Men and Namor go to their new land, but they have to deal with the problem of the sinking Utopia island and the return of Magneto.
Necrosha	December 2009 – March 2010	Story Series	The former Black Queen of the Hellfire Club, Selene brings forth a new Inner Circle of deadly mutants to assist in her ascension as a goddess. With the help of the Phalanx technological virus, she resurrects the dead population of the destroyed island of Genosha to serve as her tribute.

=== 2010s ===
Event	Date	Type	Developments
Second Coming	February–July 2010	Story Series	Second Coming is the third and final part of a trilogy of stories that began with Messiah Complex and continued in Messiah War. Intended as a conclusion to Cable's efforts to save Hope from Bishop, who has hunted the so-called Mutant Messiah since her birth; the series also builds on the Utopia, Nation X and Necrosha storylines of 2009 in the X-Men books. The story centers on the return of Cable and Hope Summers to the present day and Bastion's final campaign to destroy the X-Men. The conclusion of the story leads to a number of new launches.
Reckoning	March–May 2010	Story Series	After years of controlling their lives, Wolverine and Daken decided to team up to track down and kill Romulus. But Daken soon betrayed Wolverine, desiring to both kill Romulus and destroy his father in order to achieve his destiny by taking over Romulus' empire.
Curse of the Mutants	June 2010 – May 2011	Crossover	Vampires from around the globe descend on San Francisco to claim the city as their own, causing the X-Men and Blade to team up to stop them.
Age of X	January–May 2011	Story Series	Reality has changed, Earth-616 was replaced by a world where the X-Men never came to be, mutantkind has been hunted to extinction, the few remaining mutants band together to make their last stand.
Dark Angel Saga	May–December 2011	Story Arc	X-Force became aware of Archangel's Ascension after Warren tried to kill a reporter, to whom Shadow King had delivered files on the secret team.
Wolverine Goes to Hell	September 2010 – January 2011	Story Series	A mysterious organization known as The Red Right Hand conspires to possess Wolverine's body with demons, and send his soul to the underworld.
Collision	May–July 2011	Story Series	X-23 and Daken become uneasy allies while in Madripoor after learning that Malcolm Colcord has begun to revive Weapon X.
Schism	July–October 2011	Event	After a mutant-triggered international incident, anti-mutant hatred hits new heights. It's at this moment, when the mutant race needs most to stand together, that a split begins that tears apart the X-Men.: Regenesis: Following the schism among the members of the X-Men, Cyclops and Wolverine start recruiting their teammates; some members of the X-Men leave with Wolverine, while part of the team stays in Utopia with Cyclops. Cyclops' team becomes a peacekeeping force, while Wolverine takes on the headmaster role at the newly founded Jean Grey School for Higher Learning.
Final Execution	May–December 2012	Story Arc	When Daken returns from the dead, he plots to destroy X-Force by creating a new incarnation of the Brotherhood of Mutants with Mystique, Sabretooth, the Skinless Man, the Blob of Age of Apocalypse, the Shadow King, and the Omega Clan.
X-Termination	March–April 2013	Story Series	Billions of years ago, the Celestials created an unimaginable horror and, in realizing their error, locked it away in the space between realities. However, with all the constant travelling between realities by the worlds' heroes and villains, the barriers between realities have become weak. With the monsters released and threatening the entire multiverse, it falls to three teams from different realities to find a way to stop the monsters and save all of creation.
Battle of the Atom	September–October 2013	Story Series	The X-Men of the future travel to the present in order to force the All-New X-Men back to their own time, but things get complicated when another group of future X-Men arrives.
Vendetta	January 2014	Story Series	Stryfe returns to the present and manipulates Hope into killing Bishop. Stryfe wants Bishop to suffer after he betrayed him during Messiah War and claims that he was imprisoned and tortured by Apocalypse for years until he planned a successful escape and killed him. Cable and both teams of X-Force soon intervene and defeat Stryfe.
Apocalypse Wars	March–July 2016	Story Series	A "thematic crossover" running through the three X-Men titles of the time with each title containing a story arc related to Apocalypse, but not tying in with one another. Beginning in Extraordinary X-Men, the X-Men must travel through time to retrieve mutantkind's "last hope" from Apocalypse. Uncanny X-Men begins a story where the team deals with problems pertaining to Archangel. The All-New X-Men focuses on Kid Apocalypse (Evan Sabahnur).
Death of X	October–November 2016	Limited Series	
The Return of Charles Xavier	July 2017 – June 2018	Story Arc	This story is about the return of Charles Xavier, divided into three arcs: Life of X, A Man Called X and Mindkiller.
Mojo World Wide	October–November 2017	Story Series	Mojo, a demented creature obsessed with melding deadly television shows with reality, has made Earth his focus and it's going to take the combined might of two X-Men teams to fight back.
Phoenix Resurrection: The Return of Jean Grey	December 2017 – January 2018	Limited Series	Jean Grey had died and her friends had mourned her, but like a Phoenix, she rises from the ashes. When strange events start happening all over the world, the X-Men can only come to one conclusion–the one true Jean Grey is back!
Hate Machine	February–December 2018	Story Arc	After Phoenix Resurrection: The Return of Jean Grey, Jean Grey returns to save mutantkind from Cassandra Nova, with the help of a new team that includes Storm, Namor and new character Trinary.
'Til Death Do Us Part	April–June 2018	Story Arc	The wedding of Colossus and Kitty Pryde begins but does not go forward. Instead, the occasion leads to the wedding of Gambit and Rogue and launches duo title Mr. & Mrs. X.
Extermination	August–December 2018	Limited Series	
Return of Wolverine	September 2018 – February 2019	Limited Series	A five-issue limited series that serves as the final installment of the trilogy that started with Death of Wolverine and The Hunt for Wolverine, and sees the return of Wolverine and his encounter with the group Soteira.
Degeneration	October 2018	One-Shots	The one-shot stories feature Magneto, Mojo, Mystique, Juggernaut and Emma Frost.
Sins of the Past	December 2018 – March 2019	Story Arc	After Extermination, X-Force hunt down Ahab to save Rachel Grey with the help of Kid Cable.
X-Men Disassembled	November 2018 – January 2019	Story Arc	This 10-issue arc acts as set up for Age of X-Man. X-Man (Nate Grey), embedded with a Life Seed, creates his Horsemen of Salvation as a benign counterpart to En Sabah Nur's Four Horsemen.
Age of X-Man	January–July 2019	Event	The Last X-Men: After the devastating events of "X-Men Disassembled", it falls to Cyclops to rebuild the X-Men in the face of overwhelming hatred is "This Is Forever" and "We Have Always".
House of X/Powers of X	July–October 2019	Event	In the aftermath of Age of X-Man and the Last X-Men, Charles Xavier establishes Krakoa as a mutant nation, leading into the Krakoan Age.: Dawn of X is a publishing line and relaunch following the beginning of the Krakoan Age.

=== 2020s ===
Event	Date	Type	Developments
X of Swords	September–November 2020	Story Series	Omniversal Majestrix Saturnyne organizes a mystical tournament in Otherworld between the X-Men and the Swordbearers of Arakko. Immortal mutant Apocalypse and the rest of Krakoa must gather ten swords to the face the invading interdimensional army of Arakko, commanded by the original Four Horsemen.: Reign of X: Follow up to the Dawn of X relaunch. X, Magneto, Cyclops and Jean Grey intend to introduce the world to the new X-Men team during The Hellfire Gala.
Demon Days	March 2021 – March 2022	One-shots	A five-book story about Mariko Yashida in alternate reality (manga-like) she have to fight yokai.
Hellfire Gala	June 2021	Story Series	Krakoa is opening its gates to all planet Earth where a new team of X-Men will be unveiled and the terraforming of Mars is announced.
The Trial of Magneto	August–December 2021	Limited Series	Magneto is suspected killing the Scarlet Witch at the Hellfire Gala, who returned to life through the combination of magic and resurrection protocols.
Inferno	September 2021 – January 2022	Limited Series	The culmination of Jonathan Hickman's X-Men story revealing the cracks within the Quiet Council of Krakoa, the origin of Omega Sentinel and the purpose of Orchis, and the fate of Moira MacTaggert.
X Lives of Wolverine/X Deaths of Wolverine	January–March 2022	Limited Series	Wolverine's consciousness travels to various points in time to prevent Mikhail Rasputin and Omega Red from killing Professor X, while Omega Wolverine travels back to the present to prevent Moira MacTaggert's influence to the rise of the Post-Humanity race.: Destiny of X: The Second Krakoan Age of X-Men following the conclusion of Inferno and X Lives of Wolverine/X Deaths of Wolverine.
Sins of Sinister	January 2023	Story Series	Mister Sinister's plans come to fruition beyond his wildest dreams and his darkest nightmares, resulting in a new world.: Fall of X: The apparent end of the Krakoan Age as Mutantkind's war for the future of Krakoa will start after the devastating event of the third annual Hellfire Gala at the hands of Orchis. The storyline is built up in Before The Fall and culminates in the dual miniseries Fall of the House of X and Rise of the Powers of X.
Raid on Graymalkin	December 2024–January 2025	Story Series	Cyclops' Alaska X-Men and Rogue's Louisiana X-Men faced a standoff in a mission to free incarcerated teammates at Graymalkin Prison.
X-Manhunt	March 2025	Story Series	Professor X frees himself from incarceration at the Graymalkin Prison and seeks helps from his X-Men to embark on a personal mission.
Giant-Size X-Men	May–March 2025	Story Series	Kamala Khan is pulled by a remnant of Legion into the distant past experiencing mutant history including the birth of the X-Men in Second Genesis, the Dark Phoenix Saga, Age of Apocalypse, and House of M.
Age of Revelation	October –December 2025	Event	In a dystopian future, Apocalypse's heir Doug Ramsey becomes known as Revelation and reshapes Earth into a mutant utopia. Revelation utilizes the X-Virus, a mutagenic virus that either kills targets or gives them mutant abilities.
DNX	September 2026	Limited Series	Beast and his organization, 3K, recreate the X-Virus and release it on humans, intending to turn them into mutants.

== Spider-Man crossovers/storylines ==
=== 1970s ===
Event	Date	Type	Developments
The Six Arms Saga	September–November 1971	Story Arc	Trying to rid himself of his powers, Spider-Man drinks an experimental serum and grows four extra arms. In his quest to reverse the transformation, he battles the Lizard and Morbius, the Living Vampire.
The Night Gwen Stacy Died	June–July 1973	Story Arc	Recovering from his amnesia, Green Goblin remembers Spider-Man's true identity and kidnaps Gwen Stacy. Hero and villain duke it out on Brooklyn Bridge. Deaths of Norman Osborn (at the time) and Gwen Stacy, sowing the seeds to the first Clone Saga arc of the 1970s.

=== 1980s ===
Event	Date	Type	Developments
The Death of Jean DeWolff	October 1985 – January 1986	Story Arc	Spider-Man hunts down who murdered police captain Jean DeWolff with the help of Daredevil
Kraven's Last Hunt	October–November 1987	Story Series	Kraven, one of the world's best big-game hunters, comes to New York to hunt down Spider-Man in a last great hunt.

=== 1990s ===
Event	Date	Type	Developments
Spider-Man: Return of the Sinister Six	July–September 1990	Story Arc	Doctor Octopus is setting his master plan into action to take over the world with the help of the Sinister Six. Spider-Man manages to defeat all of them and save the world.
Round Robin: The Sidekick's Revenge!	November 1991 – January 1992	Story Arc	Midnight, Moon Knight's former sidekick, is converted into a cyborg by the Secret Empire and plans his revenge on his former partner. The story also includes Spider-Man, Moon Knight, Darkhawk, Punisher and New Warriors Night Thrasher and Nova.
Revenge of the Sinister Six	January–June 1992	Story Arc	The Sinister Six seek revenge on Doctor Octopus who asks Spider-Man for help. After failing to defeat Doctor Octopus the gang steal deadly weapons to start a massacre which leads Spider-Man to recruit various heroes to help stop them.
Hero Killers	June 1992	Story Series	As several superheroes have disappeared, it is up to Spider-Man and a new team of heroes the New Warriors to find them. This story have 2 arc: First Kill and Evil's Light.
Maximum Carnage	May–August 1993	Story Series	Spider-Man teams up with antihero Venom and various heroes to stop Carnage and his deranged "family" of killers. Story arc begins in Spider-Man Unlimited #1 and runs through all then current Spider-Man titles: Web of Spider-Man, The Amazing Spider-Man, Spider-Man, and The Spectacular Spider-Man.
Clone Saga	1994–1996	Event	Peter Parker is told he is the clone of the original Peter Parker who has returned to reclaim his life. The arc debuted of Ben Reilly as Scarlet Spider as well as the appearances of various other clones (Kaine Parker and Spidercide). Eventually Peter would discover he was the original and the others were clones created by a villain called Jackal. Return of nemesis Norman Osborn in the final, climactic arc. A 1997 one-shot, The Osborn Journals, serves to tie up loose ends of the storyline and explain how Osborn survived.: Planet of the Symbiotes: As Earth is invaded by an army of symbiotes, Venom, Spider-Man, and Scarlet Spider join forces to stop them.; Maximum Clonage: Peter Parker and Ben Reilly deal with the clone revelation (at the time), as the Jackal puts into effect his plan involving cloning.
Identity Crisis	April–June 1998	Story Series	Spider-Man was wanted for murder, thus Peter Parker is forced to develop new costumes and codenames to clear his name. Debut of the Slingers, after Identity Crisis, as independent characters with their own comic books, Slingers.
The Gathering of Five	October 1998 – March 1999	Story Series	The Gathering of Five is a secret ceremony Norman Osborn plans to use, its gifts being Power, Immortality, Wisdom, Madness and Death. Return of Madame Web and debut of Mattie Franklin. Leads to The Final Chapter, the final confrontation (at the time) between Spider-Man and the Green Goblin and the cancellation of all Vol. 1 titles.

=== 2000s ===
Event	Date	Type	Developments
Sins Past	August–November 2004	Story Arc	Gwen Stacy's death comes back to haunt Spider-Man in a big way when an exceptionally dark secret from his former lover is revealed.
Venom vs. Carnage	September–December 2004	Limited Series	Venom and Carnage, Venom's offspring, battle for the fate of Carnage's symbiote offspring, Toxin. Features Spider-Man and Black Cat.
Sins Remembered	March–May 2005	Story Arc	Gwen Stacy's past continues to haunt Spider-Man.
The Other: Evolve or Die	December 2005 – March 2006	Story Series	Spider-Man faces a life–changing event that will give a whole new experience to everything he once knew as Spider-Man because he has two options: evolve or die.
Back in Black	March–August 2007	Story Series	In the aftermath of Civil War, Aunt May has been shot by a sniper. Enraged at this situation, Spider-Man goes back to wearing his Black Suit.
One More Day	September–December 2007	Story Series	Spider-Man is facing a biggest deal of his life that involve his secret identity to the public and his marriage to Mary Jane Watson.
Brand New Day	January–July 2008	Story Arc	After the One More Day marriage to Mary Jane Watson has been erased and his secret identity has also been forgotten by everyone, now he have a new start.
New Ways to Die	August–October 2008	Story Arc	Spider-Man takes on Mister Negative, Venom, and the Thunderbolts and finds his world turned upside down when villain Norman Osborn becomes a hero.
Spider-Woman: Agent of S.W.O.R.D.	September 2009 – March 2010	Limited Series	Jessica Drew is now working for S.W.O.R.D. to rediscovers her life in a world she did not make.
The Gauntlet	November 2009 – July 2010	Story Series	Spider-Man faces his greatest enemies in a series of life-threatening challenges Grim Hunt/Hunting the Hunter: this event harks back to Kraven's Last Hunt. The Kravinoff family starts a hunt against the "Spider-totems" to resurrect their fallen patriarch, Kraven the Hunter.

=== 2010s ===
Event	Date	Type	Developments
Whatever a Spider Can	February–March 2010	Story Arc	This is the first team-up between Spider-Man and Deadpool.
One Moment in Time	July 2010 – February 2011	Story Arc	After Grim Hunt, Peter Parker convenes with Mary Jane Watson in order to explain To her about their cancelled wedding day, due to the temporal changes brought about by One More Day. Followed by The Origin of the Species as the last arc of "The Spider Brain Trust" (ASM #642–647).
Spider-Man: Big Time	November 2010 – March 2011	Story Arc	End of "The Spider Brain Trust", a gathering of rotating writers of the main Spider-book that began in 2008 with "Brand New Day". Dan Slott becomes the sole writer to spearhead the web–crawler's titles.
Spider-Island	July–November 2011	Crossover	The population of Manhattan become superpowered individuals with Spider-Man's abilities, including civilians, heroes and villains. It is revealed as a plot by the Jackal and Queen (Adriana Soria). Return of Kaine, Spider-Man's first failed clone, and launch of a new Scarlet Spider series featuring him.
Ends of the Earth	March– June 2012	Story Arc	Doctor Octopus has threatened the Earth with his Death Ray, now it is up to Spider-Man to team up with super spies and mercenaries Black Widow and Silver Sable to stop Doctor Octopus.
Omega Effect	April 2012	Crossover	Spider-Man Team-up with Daredevil, the Punisher and Rachel Cole to protect the Omega Drive from the Megacrime organization.
Spider-Men I	June–September 2012	Limited Series	Crossover between Spider-Man (Peter Parker) & Ultimate Spider-Man (Miles Morales). The story features both Spider-Men being brought together after Mysterio creates a rift between their universes.
Minimum Carnage	October–November 2012	Crossover	Carnage has escaped from prison with a little help. Now he has a plan to create an army and it is up to Scarlet Spider (Kaine Parker) and Agent Venom (Flash Thompson) to stop him.
Dying Wish	November–December 2012	Story Arc	Following Ends of the Earth, Doctor Octopus discovers Spider-Man's identity. Now, he devised a body swap plot to trap Peter's consciousness in Ock's original, dying body, and take over his life as The Superior Spider-Man.
Goblin Nation	January–April 2014	Story Arc	Norman Osborn is building a nation of goblins, while Otto Octavius' Superior Spider-Man is facing a very hard decision, even for him.
Parker Luck	April–September 2014	Story Arc	After "Goblin Nation," Peter Parker regains his own body, but he has to deal with his ex-lover Black Cat after Doctor Octopus's stint in his body.
Spider-Verse	October 2014 – February 2015	Crossover	Morlun has escaped the realm of the dead following being trapped there by the Black Panther. Now, every Spider-Man in the entire multiverse must stand together to defeat the only villain Spider-Man himself never defeated.
Most Wanted?	February–Jun 2015	Limited Series	Earth-65 where Spider-Woman (Gwen Stacy) is the Spider-Hero and Peter Parker is the Lizard, he died and she is on the most wanted list!
Greater Power	October 2015 – March 2016	Story Arc	Gwen Stacy is back and has a mystery to solve: the reappearance of the Lizard.
Spider-Women	April–June 2016	Crossover	Event begins with Alpha issue and concludes with Omega issue. Jessica Drew and Cindy Moon get stuck in Spider-Gwen's alternate reality. While they're away from the main reality, doppelgangers masquerading as they begin causing havoc in New York.
Isn't It Bromantic?	January–August 2016	Limited Series	Is the first of Spider-Man/Deadpool, a 50-issue comic book series published by Marvel Comics beginning in 2016. The title characters, Spider-Man and Deadpool, shared the focus of the book. The adventure of Spider-Man and Deadpool beginning
Dead No More: The Clone Conspiracy	October 2016 – February 2017	Event	The Jackal, now a mysterious man in a red suit and wearing an Anubis mask, approaches several of Spider-Man's Rogues' Gallery with a proposition to return to life their dead loved ones, in exchange for their services. "The Clone Conspiracy" runs in a main five-issue miniseries, and crossing with several Spider-Man titles (ongoings Amazing Spider-Man and Silk, and Prowler miniseries). Storyline is preceded by a story arc called "Before Dead No More", which ran in issues of Amazing Spider-Man and concludes with Dead No More: The Clone Conspiracy: Omega. Launch of new Scarlet Spider series.
Sitting In A Tree	January–March 2017	Crossover	When Miles Morales' father Jefferson Davis goes missing during a mission for S.H.I.E.L.D., Maria Hill sends him on a mission to another dimension to find him, and Spider-Man ends up teaming up with that dimension's resident spider person: Spider-Gwen and somehow the two end up in a relationship.
Til Death Do Us...	March–April 2017	Crossover	When an affront to Shiklah's people demands justice, a line is crossed. As the Monster Metropolis declares war on the surface world, Deadpool must choose between the wife to whom he's pledged himself and the role he's been crafting for himself as a hero. Wade and Shiklah's simmering animosity comes to a boil in Deadpool, before spilling over into Spider-Man/Deadpool and Deadpool and the Mercs for Money.
Spider-Men II	July–December 2017	Limited Series	Sequel to the 2012 mini series. Peter Parker and Ultimate Miles Morales discover who is the Miles Morales of the prime Marvel Universe.
Venomverse	September–October 2017	Crossover	Eddie Brock is brought to the forefront of the Marvel Universe as Venom coupled with a multitude of alternate universe counterparts, as a new sinister alien race known as Poisons, nature's answer to the symbiotes, began a quest for insatiable powers as they discover the existence of the Multiverse. Contained within these comics serves as an epilogue to the event and sees the first attempt of the Poisons to invade Prime Marvel Universe.
The Slingers Return	September 2017 – January 2018	Story Arc	The Slingers have been reunited by a fake Black Marvel (a demon in disguise) and a new Hornet.
Sinister Six Reborn	November 2017 – April 2018	Story Arc	A new Sinister Six is formed by Miles Morales' uncle Aaron (The Prowler).
L.M.Ds Saga	November 2017 – July 2018	Story Arc	Chameleon plans to build an army of Life Model Decoys, now it is up to Team Spider-Man and Team Deadpool to stop him. This story has three parts: Arms Race, Oldies and Area 14.
Venom Inc.	December 2017 – January 2018	Crossover	This storyline also sees Eddie Brock make his way back into Spider-Man's world in the six-part story kicking off in an alpha issue, and continuing in Amazing Spider-Man and Venom #159–160 before concluding in a finale omega issue.
Web of Venom	2018–2020	One-Shots	Marvel Comics releases comics about Venom, symbiotes, and others.
Threat Level: Red	January–May 2018	Story Arc	Norman Osborn is back and he got himself a Carnage Symbiote, turning him into the Red Goblin and setting the stage for an ultimate confrontation with Spider-Man. Go Down Swinging is part of this story. Death of long-standing supporting character Flash Thompson in issue #800.
Venomized	April–May 2018	Limited Series	The epic conclusion of the storyline that began with Venomverse! With planet Earth defenseless following the events of Poison X, the Poisons' finally reveal their first objective, put every superhuman in a symbiote–and consume them!
Rex	May–September 2018	Story Arc	The Venom symbiote suddenly relapsing into madness leads Venom (Eddie Brock) to turn to a mysterious man named Rex Strickland for help and answers. When a primordial symbiote awakens; Venom is forced to team up with Strickland and Spider-Man (Miles Morales) in order to stop an ancient god of darkness from being unleashed.
Spider-Geddon	September–December 2018	Event	
Hunted	February–June 2019	Story Arc	Spider-Man, Black Cat and other animal-themed supervillains are trapped in Central Park following a lockdown by Kraven to act as his prey in the great hunt.
Marvel's Spider-Man (Gamerverse)	2019, 2020	Limited series	Series of Comics introducing the new video game universe of Marvel City at War: Retelling of the PS4 game. Spider-Man, after finally getting the Kingpin arrested, must deal with a new superpowered gang called the Demons led by Mr. Negative while also helping his teacher Otto Octavius with a dangerous project. The comics also explores the background of other characters such Mary Jane Watson and Miles Morales. Velocity: In the first original Gamerverse story, Spider-Man must deal with an enemy that cannot be seen which leads in to the creation of the velocity suit to deal with a speedster. The Black Cat Strikes: Retelling of the Spider-Man: The City That Never Sleeps DLC. Spider-Man must deal with the Black Cat and try to stop a gang war between the NYPD, Hammerhead's gang and Silver Sable's private military. The comics also explores Spider-Man and Black Cat first meeting in this universe.
Absolute Carnage	August–November 2019	Event	Cletus Kasady is back, deadlier and more powerful than ever. Acting on the behest of evil cosmic entity Knull, he targets every character in the Marvel Universe that has ever worn a symbiote before (nearly every hero, after the events of Venomized), and some of Spider-Man and Venom closest friends, family and enemies.
Bloodline	November 2019 – December 2020	Limited series	On an alternate earth created by director J. J. Abrams and his son Henry with artist Sara Pichelli, when Peter Parker suffers a tremendous loss caused by a new villain called Cadaverous, causing him to give up on Spider-Man, a new teenager close to Peter takes the mantle of the Spider when the murderous villain returns 12 years later.
Symbiote Spider-Man	2019	Limited series	Spider-Man is back in his Symbiote suit but in all kinds of different ways.
Venom Island	December 2019 – May 2020	Story Arc	After Absolute Carnage, Eddie Brock returns to a forgotten island where he tried to kill Spider-Man to deal with what is left of Carnage.

=== 2020s ===
Event	Date	Type	Developments
Twilight in Babylon	March 2020 – October 2020	Story Arc	On Earth-90214, year 1939, The Spider-Man has no choice but to leave New York when the murder of a dame in a nightclub and the clues pointing overseas sends him in the search of a mysterious evil.
Venom Beyond	July–November 2020	Story Arc	A sequel to Venom Island and the prequel to symbiote-focused event King in Black. Eddie Brock and his son Dylan travel to another dimension to witness firsthand the consequences of his son's powers in a symbiote-infested world.
Sins Rising	July–September 2020	Story Arc	The Sin-Eater (Stan Carter) returns from the dead and Spider-Man will have to make a choice between his moral compass and a dark revengeful desire.
Last Remains	October–December 2020	Story Arc	Kindred has stepped out of the shadows as the true puppetmaster behind Sin-Eater's strings. The villain hatches a plan to attack Spider-Man at his most personal, by threatening Mary Jane, fellow Spider-Heroes, and their loved ones.
The Clone Saga	March–September 2021	Story Arc	Miles Morales faces his own Clone Saga, as villain the Assessor, who had Miles in captivity (MM: Spider- Man #7), lets loose a series of clones in Brooklyn to mess with Miles' life.
King's Ransom	March–May 2021	Story Arc	Spider-Man's long-awaited confrontation with Kingpin.
Spider's Shadow	April–August 2021	Limited series	In a bold new approach to the "What if..?" stories, Peter Parker has never taken off the symbiote suit that would later become Venom. Haunted by terrible nightmares, a terribly tired hero is not ready for an attack of the Hobgoblin that cause a personal tragedy and succumbs to new dark impulses. Spider-Man's rules and responsibilities are about to change but is Peter really in charge?
Chameleon Conspiracy	June 2021	Story Arc	Spider-Man faces off against an anarchic alliance of Chameleon, Foreigner, Chance, and Jack O'Lantern. Meanwhile, Teresa Parker, Spider-Man's sister, meets the Chameleon to revolve long buried secrets about the death of her parents.
Sinister War	July–October 2021	Story Arc	After King's Ransom and Chameleon Conspiracy, Doctor Octopus returns with his own Sinister Six in a war with Vulture's Savage Six. The aftermath of this story is "What Cost Victory".
Extreme Carnage	July–September 2021	Crossover	Flash Thompson battles Carnage, who has taken control of Phage, Scream, Riot, Agony, and other symbiotes through their codices.
Beyond	October 2021 – March 2022	Story Series	After a disastrous run-in with the U-Foes, Peter Parker lies hospitalized. To fill in his absence, Ben Reilly becomes Spider-Man again full-time, only this time working for the Beyond Corporation.
End of the Spider-Verse	October 2022 – April 2023	Story Series	Shathra infects Spider-People across dimensions, bringing the end of the entire Spider-Verse.
What Did Peter Do?	March 2023 – May 2023	Story Series	The flashback story reveals the mastermind behind what happened a year ago (after the Beyond event) and how Spider-Man's life went on a downward spiral. The story explores how Peter's actions caused everyone to alienate him and how his relationship with Mary Jane Watson ended with disappointment, leading directly to a shocking conclusion that will ruin Spider-Man's life completely.
Marvel's Spider-Man 2 (Gamerverse)	May 2023	Crossover	Following the events of the 2018 Marvel's Spider-Man video game and the 2020 Marvel's Spider-Man Miles Morales video game, Peter and Miles with the help of Mary Jane must take a new gang led by their leader the Hood, who seems to have mystical powers while also dealing with the aftermath of both their respective adventure. This comic also serves as a prequel to the 2023 Marvel's Spider-Man 2 video game.
Carnage Reigns	May 2023 - June 2023	Crossover	Miles Morales against Cletus Kasady.
Summer of Symbiotes	May 2023 - November 2023	Story Series	A crossover starring the publisher's most famous symbiotes.
Gang War	November 2023 – March 2024	Crossover	After the chaos at the wedding for Tombstone's daughter and every crime lord blaming the other, the super criminals of New York take their crime families to battle in the open for underworld dominance. Sensing a conspiracy to bring such an event to pass and plunge the city into war, Spider-Man seeks the help of his fellow street-level heroes to suppress and conclude the hostilities within a 48-hour window of opportunity. However, the new anti-vigilante laws of the city tasked the NYPD with stopping the Gang War as well as the vigilantes.
The 8 Deaths of Spider-Man	November 2024 - March 2025	Story series	With Peter facing his existential crisis, Doctor Doom, the current Sorcerer Supreme, grants him an offer to be Earth's champion to fight off against the eight powerful Scions of Cyttorak that are threaten to destroy the world at the cost eight lives.
Amazing Spider-Man/Venom: Death Spiral	February 2026 - May 2026	Story series	As a deadly new killer emerges, Spider-Man and Venom are pulled into a mystery where Carnage knows Peter's secret — but Peter doesn't know Mary Jane Watson is Venom, setting up a collision that could cost him everything.

== Marvel 2099 ==
Event	Date	Type	Developments
Fall of the Hammer	February 1994	Crossover	In the futuristic world of 2099, a floating city, called Valhalla, appears in the sky – its passengers claiming to be gods. The heroes from the future of 2099 plan to find out the truth.
One Nation Under Doom	May – October 1995	Crossover	In the year 2099, the U.S.A is ruled by megacorporations, and Doctor Doom makes its bid to become the American President.
Spider-Man 2099 Meets Spider-Man	November 1995	One-Shot	Miguel O'Hara meets Peter Parker.
Timestorm 2009–2099	June – October 2009	Crossover	Spider-Man and Wolverine were transported to the year 2099 to save the future.
Civil War 2099	August – October 2016	Story Arc	Part of the Civil War II event. The world of the year 2099 is in danger and Miguel O'Hara must come to the present to save it.
Marvel 2099	October – December 2019	Crossover	Miguel O’Hara travels back from the year 2099 to the present day to enlist Peter Parker's help in saving the timeline from an impending collapse
Annihilation 2099	July – September 2024	Limited Series	The new cosmic-heroes of 2099 against a cosmic threat.
Conquest 2099	October – December 2024	Limited Series	Dracula attacks the new vampire homeworld, Domus Draconum, bringing him into conflict with the 2099 heroes.
The End 2099	February – June 2026	Limited Series	The 2099 future faces total destruction from Abyssus, a horrifying fusion of a Knull-infected Galactus.

== Ultimate Marvel/Ultimate Universe ==
Event	Date	Type	Developments
Ultimate War	2002–2003	Limited Series	After the government discovers that Charles Xavier lied about killing Magneto they order the Ultimates to hunt down the X-Men.
Ultimate Six	2003–2004	Limited Series	Electro, Kraven, Doctor Octopus, Sandman, and Spider-Man's nemesis, the Green Goblin are incarcerated by the Ultimates. Hank Pym (Giant Man/Ant Man) attempts to rehabilitate them. Ultimately, this doesn't go well. They escape and force Spider-Man to launch an attack upon the White House.
Ultimate Galactus Trilogy	2004–2006	Limited Series	The story chronicles the coming of Gah Lak Tus.
Ultimate X4	2005–2006	Limited Series	Cerebro has been stolen and the trail points directly at the government's premier think tank, the Baxter Building. The X-Men aren't happy about it and the Baxter Building's most famous residents, the Fantastic Four aren't happy about an angry team of mutants showing up on their doorstep.
Ultimate Power	2006–2008	Limited Series	A few days after Reed Richards sends five probes into other dimensions the roof of the Baxter Building is ripped open by a massive explosion, heralding the sudden appearance of the Squadron Supreme. They declare Reed Richards under arrest for his crimes against their planet.
Ultimatum	2008–2009	Event	The story deals with Magneto's attempts to destroy the world following the apparent deaths of the Scarlet Witch and Quicksilver in Ultimates 3. Following the Ultimatum storyline, each Ultimate title was given a Requiem follow-up series or one-shot, dealing with the status of each book's characters in the aftermath of Ultimatum.
Ultimate Comics: Armor Wars	2009	Story Arc	An adaptation of the original Armor Wars story line.
Doomsday	2010–2011	Limited Series	The story mainly focuses on what remains of the Fantastic Four after Ultimatum, specifically dealing with an unknown threat trying to alter the entire Ultimate Universe, in the process causing a significant amount of destruction.
Death of Spider-Man	2011	Event	The story details the death of Spider-Man. It also crosses over with Ultimate Avengers vs. New Ultimates 1–6. After this the entire Ultimate line was relaunched with Ultimate Comics Universe Reborn tagline. The titles relaunched were Ultimate Comics: X-Men, Ultimate Comics: Ultimates, and Ultimate Comics: Spider-Man, with Ultimate Comics: Fallout and Ultimate Comics: Hawkeye being released as mini series.
Ultimate Fallout	2011	Limited Series	Aftermath of Death of Spider-Man
Prowler	2012	Story Arc	After Miles Morales receive the Spider-Man suit, his mission is his uncle who goes the Prowler.
Divided We Fall	2012	Event	Return of Ultimate Captain America after the death of Ultimate Spider-Man.
United We Stand	2012	Event	Captain America is elected the new president of the United States and a new mutant nation is born.
Hunger	2013	Limited Series	In the aftermath of Age of Ultron, the timestream is broken and Earth-616's Galactus entered the Ultimate Universe.
Cataclysm	2013–2014	Event	Wounded at the end of Hunger, Galactus comes to the Ultimate Earth to feed, leading the heroes on a last ditch attempt to stop him.: Ultimate Marvel NOW!: Release new comics, after Galactus' attack, the heroes face the consequences of almost the end of the world.
Ultimate End	2015	Limited Series	Part of the Secret Wars event, this mini series tells the final Ultimate Universe story ahead of the birth of a new combined universe with the Earth-616 universe in September 2015.
Ultimate Invasion	2023	Limited Series	The Maker is determined to restore his reality by invading the Marvel Universe, and Miles Morales will be in the middle of this conflict.
Ultimate Spider-Man: Incursion	2025	Limited Series	Miles Morales sets out to rescue his younger sister, Billie, after she is transported to Earth-6160.
Ultimate Endgame	2025–2026	Limited Series	The Maker returns and attempts to reclaim power after being imprisoned in the City, his own headquarters, for two years.

== Intercompany crossovers ==
Crossover	Timespan	Company	Notes
Marvel/DC	1976–2026	DC Comics	Marvel/Superman (1976–2026); Spider-Man/Superman (1976–2026); Superman vs. The Amazing Spider-Man (1976): Superman and Spider-Man must stop a world domination/destruction plot hatched in tandem by their respective arch-nemeses, Lex Luthor and Doctor Octopus.; Superman and Spider-Man (1981): Superman and Spider-Man battle the Parasite and Doctor Doom, with the Hulk and Wonder Woman guest-starring.; Superman/Spider-Man (2026): A virus infected Brainiac teams with Dr. Octopus to transfer the virus into the minds of humans on Earth. Superman and Spider-Man team up to put a stop to it.; Backup stories: Lois Lane & Mary Jane: While their respective husbands battle a Sentinel, Mary Jane and Lois engage in girl talk. Lois ultimately gives the X-Man Gambit some of her playing cards so Gambit can help Superman and Spider-Man finish off the giant robot.; Superboy-Prime & The Amazing Spider-Man: Set in the 1980s, Superboy finds himself in the Marvel Universe and lures the black costume clad Spider-Man into another dimension so he can hand him over to an alternate version of the High Evolutionary. Ultimately Superboy changes his mind and teams up with Spider-Man.; Superboy & Spider-Man 2099: Spider-Man 2099 heads to 2039 to stop the corporations LexCorp and Alchemax from merging. This merger will have major repercussions in the future. He encounters and then teams up with Superboy (from the 30th century) and Batman Beyond.; Superman's Pal Jimmy Olsen & Carnage: Jimmy gets a job at the Daily Bugle and while trying to find Spider-Man to photograph, he encounters and is murdered by Carnage.; Jonathan Kent & Ben Parker: Superman and Spider-Man talk about their respective fathers and how they had a huge impact on their lives. They don't realize that their fathers met years before they were born, teaming up to save some children during a storm.; Daily Planet & Daily Bugle: J. Jonah Jameson has a nationally televised debate with Lois Lane about the merits of opinion in the media.; Power Girl & Punisher: When the Punisher makes his way to an underground club to hunt supervillains, he encounters and teams up with Power Girl, who was there on a blind date. After the bad guys are defeated, the two of them go out together.; Spider-Man/Superman (2026): Spider-Man and Superman team up to battle Lex Luthor and the Green Goblin who send the Venom symbiote to possess Superman. After the heroes win, Clark Kent invites Peter Parker and Aunt May over to have dinner with him and the Kents.; Backup stories: Spider-Man Noir & Superman: In 1938, Spider-Man Noir and the new hero Superman team up to defeat Lex Luthor and clear J. Jonah Jameson's name.; Gwen Stacy & Lana Lang: The two college girls meet on campus and talk about the two guys they have crushes on; Peter Parker and Clark Kent.; Mysterio vs. Superman: Mysterio teams with Saturn Queen to channel rage through the Hulk (via a Red Lantern) to cause mass chaos. This causes heroes and villains across America to battle one another. A group of heroes led by Superman and the Thing save the day.; Hobgoblin vs. Steel: The Hobgoblin steals an invention from Steel, only for Steel to team up with Thor to take down the villain.; Ghost-Spider & Supergirl: The two heroines team up to stop Livewire.; Miles Morales: Spider-Man & Superman: The two heroes team up to battle Brainiac and Dormammu.; Symbiotes in Metropolis: The Mighty Thor and Wonder Woman team up to battle symbiote infused parademons (called Paravenoms) from Apokolips.; Spider-Man & Superman: When Spider-Man remembers the day Gwen Stacy died, Superman comforts him and offers him advice.; Silver Surfer/Superman (1997); Silver Surfer/Superman (1997): The Last Son of Krypton meets the Herald of Galactus.; Fantastic Four/Superman (1999); Superman/Fantastic Four: The Infinite Destruction (1999): Superman and the Fantastic Four must unite to stop the Cyborg Superman and Galactus.; Hulk/Superman (1999); The Incredible Hulk vs. Superman (1999): You did not think their battle in DC vs. Marvel was the last word on the issue, did you? Worlds tremble as the two must fight it out, but is there something more sinister afoot?; Marvel/Batman (1981–2025); Hulk/Batman (1981); Batman vs. The Incredible Hulk (1981): Batman and the Hulk battle the Joker and the Shaper of Worlds.; Punisher/Batman (1994); Batman/Punisher: Lake of Fire (1994): The Punisher and Batman meet, and things do not go well.; Punisher/Batman: Deadly Knights (1994): Batman meets the Punisher again, and things worsen.; Spider-Man/Batman (1995–1997); Spider-Man & Batman: Disordered Minds (1995): The Joker and Carnage meet when behavioral psychiatrist Cassandra Briar attempts to use the two killers as tests for a computer chip that will 'lobotomize' their homicidal instincts.; Batman & Spider-Man: New Age Dawning (1997): Ra's al Ghul manipulates the Kingpin to his side and begins plans for worldwide devastation.; Captain America/Batman (1997); Batman/Captain America (1996): The two heroes, mortals fighting alongside the mightiest of beings, must fight a threat to both worlds.; Daredevil/Batman (1997–2000); Daredevil/Batman: Eye for an Eye (1997): Batman and Daredevil must work together to defeat Two-Face and Mr. Hyde.; Batman/Daredevil: King of New York (2000): Batman and Daredevil must work together again to defeat Ra's al Ghul and the Kingpin.; Deadpool/Batman (2025); Deadpool/Batman (2025): The Joker hires Deadpool to capture Batman. The heroes then work together to stop the villain.; Backup stories: Captain America & Wonder Woman: In a shared universe, the two heroes have been battling villains from World War 2 to the future.; Jeff! & Krypto: The two super pets play long distance volleyball.; Daredevil & Green Arrow : The heroes battle The League of Shadows and Count Vertigo in Hell's Kitchen New York.; Rocket Raccoon & Green Lantern: The Guardians of the Galaxy and the Guardians of the Universe swap heroes. This allows Rocket to wear a Green Lantern ring.; Old Man Logan & Batman The Dark Knight: The aged heroes get into a fight to the finish.; Logo: An Amalgam Comics story where Logo (Wolverine/Lobo) bursts on the scene.; Batman/Deadpool (2025): When a romantic fling between Eternity and Kismet causes reality to be distorted, Batman and Deadpool team with Grant Morrison to stop Cassandra Nova. Story features the return of the Amalgam Comics character Dark Claw, and the two heroes merging briefly into Dead Bat.; Backup stories: John Constantine: Hellblazer & Doctor Strange: When a disruption in magic causes beings from the two universes to battle one another (Mephisto vs Neron and Ghost Rider vs Swamp Thing), John Constantine seeks out Doctor Strange to put things right.; Nightwing & Laura Kinney: Wolverine: Dick and Laura team up to rescue Laura's sister Gabby from Killer Croc.; Harley Quinn & The Incredible Hulk: The Hulk and Harley battle a robot biker mouse and toxic waste mutated killer hot dogs at an amusement park.; Static & Ms. Marvel: The two heroes team up to battle a Kaiju.; X-Men/Teen Titans (1982); The Uncanny X-Men and The New Teen Titans (1982): The two teams must unite to battle Darkseid, Deathstroke, and Dark Phoenix.; Galactus/Darkseid (1995); Darkseid vs. Galactus: The Hunger (1995): Galactus tries to devour Apokolips.; Silver Surfer/Green Lantern (1995); Green Lantern/Silver Surfer: Unholy Alliances (1995): Green Lantern and the Silver Surfer battle Parallax and Thanos. The book ends with a tease for Marvel Versus DC.; Marvel/DC (1996–1998); Marvel Versus DC (1996): Two brothers who personify the DC and Marvel Universes become aware of the other's existence and challenge each other to a series of duels involving each universe's respective superheroes. The losing universe will cease to exist. The story has an out-of-universe component in that although there are 11 primary battles, the storyline does not show one side as victorious. The "brothers" resolve the situation by temporarily creating a new universe, called the Amalgam Universe, which is occupied by merged versions of many of the heroes. An inter-dimensional character called Access eventually manages to restore the universes to their normal state.; Amalgam Comics (1996–1997): An imprint owned by both DC and Marvel that published one-shots set on a fusion of New Earth & Earth-616 called the Amalgam Universe or Earth-9602.; Amazon (1996): A story following the fusion of Wonder Woman and Storm.; Doctor Strangefate (1996): Two stories following the fusion of Doctor Fate, Doctor Strange, and Professor X.; Assassins (1996): Two stories following the genderswapped fusion of Deathstroke and Daredevil and the fusion of Catwoman and Elektra.; JLX (1996): Two stories following the fusions of the Justice League and the X-Men.; Legends of the Dark Claw (1996): Two stories following the fusion of Batman and Wolverine.; Super-Soldier (1996): Two stories following the fusion of Superman and Captain America.; Bruce Wayne, Agent of S.H.I.E.L.D. (1996): A story following the fusion of Batman and Nick Fury.; Bullets and Bracelets (1996): A story following the fusion of Diana Prince and Lynn Michaels as well as the fusion of Steve Trevor and the Punisher.; Magneto and the Magnetic Men (1996): A story following Magneto and the fusions of the Metal Men and the Brotherhood of Mutants.; Speed Demon (1996): A story following the fusion of the Flash and Ghost Rider.; Spider-Boy (1996): A story following the fusion of Superboy and Spider-Man.; X-Patrol (1996): Two stories following the fusions of Doom Patrol and X-Force.; Bat-Thing (1997): Two stories following the fusion of Man-Bat and Man-Thing.; Dark Claw Adventures (1997): A parallel of the Batman: The Animated Seriesspin-off comic, The Batman Adventures, that supposedly features the animated series version of Dark Claw.; Generation Hex (1997): Two stories set in an alternate version of the Amalgam Universe's Wild West that feature the fusions of Generation X and DC's various Wild West characters. The team name is an amalgamation of Generation X and Jonah Hex's names.; JLX Unleashed (1997): The JLX must team up with the Judgement League Avengers (a fusion of the Justice League and the Avengers) to defeat Fin Fang Flame (a fusion of Brimstone and Fin Fang Foom).; Lobo the Duck (1997): Two stories set in an alternate Amalgam Universe where various heroes have been murdered and it's up to the fusion of Lobo and Howard the Duck to find the murderer.; Super-Soldier: Man of War (1997): Two stories featuring Super-Soldier set during World War II in the style of Golden Age comics.; Challengers of the Fantastic (1997): Two stories following the fusions of the Challengers of the Unknown and the Fantastic Four.; The Exciting X-Patrol (1997): X-Patrol must defeat Brother Brood, the fusion of Brother Blood and Brood.; Iron Lantern (1997): Two stories featuring the fusion of Green Lantern and Iron Man.; The Magnetic Men featuring Magneto (1997): Two stories featuring Magneto and the Magnetic Men facing off against the Sinister Society, a fusion of the Secret Society of Super-Villains and the Sinister Six.; Spider-Boy Team-Up (1997): Spider-Boy teams up with the Legion of Galactic Guardians 2099, the fusions of the Legion of Super-Heroes, and the Guardians of the Galaxy.; Thorion of the New Asgods (1997): Two stories following the fusion of Orion and Thor.; Marvel/DC: All Access (1996–1997): Various aspects of each company's main universe start transporting from one another and it's up to Access to prevent them from merging again.; Unlimited Access (1997–1998): Access' powers start acting up and send him and others across time and space.; Avengers/Justice League (2003); Avengers/JLA (2003): Krona, an exiled Oan, travels across the Multiverse and destroys universes, seeking the truth of creation. When he arrives in the Marvel Universe, the Grandmaster, wanting to save his universe, proposes that they play a game.; Spider-Man/Superboy (2015); Spider-Verse (2015): The Amalgam Universe Spider-Boy makes a cameo appearance in Spider-Verse #2.; Fantastic Four/The Flash (2025); The Flash/Fantastic Four (2025): The Flash and the Fantastic Four team up to battle Gorilla Grodd across time and space.; Thor/Shazam (2025); Thor/Shazam! (2025): Thor and Captain Marvel team up to battle Mister Mind, who has stolen the powers of ten beings across both universes.; Blade/Supergirl (2026); Supergirl/Blade (2026): Mojo transports both Supergirl and Blade to Mojoworld to act in a romance show. The two heroes turn the tables on him.; Jeff the Land Shark/Aquaman (2026); It's Jeff!/Aquaman (2026): Aquaman teams up with Jeff to stop Jeff's friend Ken (a giant pink octopus) from terrorizing a beach.
The Punisher/Archie	1994	Archie Comics	Archie Meets the Punisher (1994): The Punisher visits Riverdale High School.
Marvel/Ultraverse	1995–1997	Malibu Comics	Avengers/Ultraforce (1995); Avengers/Ultraforce (1995): The Avengers team up with Ultraforce.; Ultraforce/Avengers (1995): The conclusion of the previous story.; Black September (1995): It follows the reality-changes effects of the crossover with the Marvel Universe.; Marvel/Rune (1995–1996); Rune/Silver Surfer (1995): Rune's journey to the Marvel Universe in search of the Infinity Gems.; Conan vs. Rune (1995): Conan the Barbarian against the Dark God Rune.; Rune vs. Venom (1996): Eddie Brock against Rune.; Godwheel (1995): The ultra-heroes and villains are transported to the Godwheel by the God Argus.; X-Men/The Night Man (1995–1996); The Night Man vs. Wolverine (1995): Wolverine against Nightman.; The Night Man/Gambit (1996): Johnny Domino meets Remy LeBeau.; Marvel/Prime (1996); Prime/Captain America (1996): The mighty Prime teams up with the Sentinel of Liberty.; Prime vs. The Incredible Hulk (1996): The two most powerful heroes in their universes meet each other.; The All-New Exiles vs. X-Men (1996): The X-Men cross the dimensional barrier into the Ultraverse to find the missing Juggernaut.; The Phoenix Resurrection (1996): Crossover between the Ultra-heroes and the X-Men.; UltraForce/Spider-Man (1996): Peter Parker meets The Ultra Force.; Ultraverse Unlimited (1996): Rune vs. Adam Warlock and Ultraforce vs. All New Exiles.; Ultraverse: Future Shock (1997): Behold the ultimate future of the Ultraverse.
Marvel/Badrock	1996–1997	Image Comics	Wolverine/Badrock (1996); Badrock/Wolverine (1996): Badrock decides to help Wolverine in Savage Land.; Spider-Man/Badrock (1997); Spider-Man/Badrock (1997): Spider-Man and Badrock come into conflict.
Spider-Man/Backlash	1996	Image Comics	Backlash/Spider-Man (1996): Spider-Man and Backlash team up to take on Venom and Pike.
Hulk/Pitt	1996	Image Comics	Hulk/Pitt (1996): Hulk and Pitt team up.
Iron Man/X-O Manowar	1996	Valiant Comics	X-O Manowar/Iron Man in Heavy Metal (1996): A crossover between the two most popular armored heroes in comic.; Iron Man/X-O Manowar in Heavy Metal (1996): The conclusion of the previous story between the armored Avenger and the ballistic barbarian.
X-Force/Youngblood	1996	Image Comics	Yougblood/X-Force (1996); X-Force/Youngblood (1996)
X-Men/Star Trek	1996–1998	Paramount Pictures	Star Trek/X-Men (1996); Star Trek: The Next Generation/X-Men: Second Contact (1998)
Marvel/Gen^{13}	1996–2001	WildStorm Productions	Spider-Man/Gen^{13} (1996); Spider-Man/Gen^{13} (1996): Spider-Man teams up with Gen^{13}.; Generation X/Gen^{13} (1996–1997); Gen^{13}/Generation X (1996): Generation X and Gen^{13} must team up to save a mutant from suspended animation.; Generation X/Gen^{13} (1997): Generation X and Gen^{13} must team up yet again.; Fantastic Four/Gen^{13} (2001); Gen^{13}/Fantastic Four (2001): During Gen^{13}'s time in New York City they cross paths with local heroes, the Fantastic Four.
Gladiator/Supreme	1997	Maximum Press	Gladiator/Supreme (1997): The two most powerful beings in their universes confront each other.
Wolverine/Deathblow	1997	Image Comics	Deathblow/Wolverine (1997): Wolverine and Deathblow team up against a ninja clan.
Team X/Team 7	1997	Image Comics	Team X/Team 7 (1997): The two most violent teams in history team up.
Cable/Prophet	1997	Image Comics	Prophet/Cable (1997): Nathan Summers and John Prophet team up against Kang and Crypt.
X-Men/WildCATS	1997	Image Comics	WildC.A.T.s/X-Men: The Golden Age (1997): Wolverine and Zealot team up against the Nazis.; WildC.A.T.s/X-Men: The Silver Age (1997): The classic X-Men and the WildCATS confront the Daemonites and the Brood.; WildC.A.T.s/X-Men: The Modern Age (1997): The X-Men and the WildCATS team up against Hellfire Club and the Daemonites.; WildC.A.T.s/X-Men: The Dark Age (1997): In the future, the X-Men and the WildCATS team up to stop the Daemonites and the Sentinels.
Marvel/WildStorm	1997	WildStorm Productions	World War 3 (1997): Various WildStorm heroes team up with Captain America, Iron Man, the Fantastic Four, and the Avengers.
Marvel/Shi	1997–2000	Crusade Comics	Daredevil/Shi (1997); Shi/Daredevil (1997): Shi meets Daredevil.; Daredevil/Shi (1997): Shi and Daredevil team up once again.; Wolverine/Shi (1999–2000); Wolverine/Shi: Dark Night of Judgment (1999): A bloody battle between Wolverine and Shi ensues on the streets of Tokyo.; Shi: Judgment Night (2000): Shi meets Wolverine yet again.
Marvel/Top Cow	1997–2009	Top Cow Productions	Devil's Reign (1997): A crossover between Top Cow and Marvel against Mephisto.; Devil's Reign: Silver Surfer/Witchblade (1997); Devil's Reign: Weapon Zero/Silver Surfer (1997); Devil's Reign: Cyblade/Ghost Rider (1997); Devil's Reign: Ghost Rider/Ballistic (1997); Devil's Reign: Ballistic/Wolverine (1997); Devil's Reign: Wolverine/Witchblade (1997); Devil's Reign: Witchblade/Elektra (1997); Devil's Reign: Elektra/Cyblade (1997); Devil's Reign: Silver Surfer/Weapon Zero (1997); Unholy Union (2007): A one-shot comic crossover between Marvel and Top Cow.; Fusion (2009): A crossover between Top Cow's Cyber Force and Hunter-Killer and Marvel's Avengers and Thunderbolts.
Punisher/Painkiller Jane	2001	Event Comics	Punisher/Painkiller Jane (2001): A one-shot comic crossover between Frank Castle and Jane Vasko.
Marvel/The Darkness	2004–2006	Top Cow Productions	Hulk/The Darkness (2004); The Darkness/The Incredible Hulk (2004): The Hulk and The Darkness face off against each other in a no holds bared battle.; Wolverine/The Darkness (2006); The Darkness\Wolverine (2006): Jackie Estacado and Logan never met, but the power of the Darkness and Wolverine did.
Marvel/Witchblade	2004-2007	Top Cow Productions	Wolverine/Witchblade (2004); Witchblade/Wolverine (2004): Wolverine and Witchblade-wielder Sara Pezzini getting married...and then gets crazier from there!; Punisher/Witchblade (2007); Witchblade/The Punisher (2007): Sara Pezzini and Frank Castle face off against each other.
Spider-Man/Invincible	2006	Skybound Entertainment	Spider-Man Meets Invincible (2006): Invincible finds himself in the Marvel universe and teams up with Spider-Man to take down Doctor Octopus.
X-Men/Cyberforce	2007	Top Cow Productions	Cyberforce/X-Men (2007): A one-shot comic crossover between Marvel's X-Men and Top Cow's Cyberforce.
New Avengers/Transformers	2007	IDW Publishing	The New Avengers / Transformers (2007): The Earth's Mightiest Heroes and the Autobots teams up against Doctor Doom and the Decepticons.
Spider-Man/Red Sonja	2007–2008	Dynamite Entertainment	Spider-Man/Red Sonja (2007–2008): Spider-Man and Red Sonja must team up to take on the evil sorcerer Kulan Gath and Venom.
Avengers/Attack on Titan	2014	Kodansha Comics	Attack on Avengers (2014): crossover between The Avengers and Attack on Titan (Shingeki no Kyojin).
Marvel/Predator	2023–2025	20th Century Studios	Wolverine/Predator (2023); Predator vs. Wolverine (2023); Black Panther/Predator (2024); Predator vs. Black Panther (2024); Spider-Man/Predator (2025); Predator vs. Spider-Man (2025); Marvel/Predator (2025); Predator Kills the Marvel Universe (2025); Punisher/Predator (2026); Predator vs. Punisher (2026)
Avengers/Ultraman	2024	Tsuburaya Productions	Ultraman X Avengers (2024)
Marvel/Alien	2024–2026	20th Century Studios	Avengers/Alien (2024–2025); Aliens vs. Avengers (2024–2025); Captain America/Alien (2025–2026); Alien vs. Captain America (2025–2026); X-Men/Alien (2026); Alien vs. X-Men (2026)
Marvel/Godzilla	2025	Toho	Godzilla vs Marvel (2025); Godzilla vs. Fantastic Four (2025); Godzilla vs. Hulk (2025); Godzilla vs. Spider-Man (2025); Godzilla vs. X-Men (2025); Godzilla vs. Avengers (2025); Godzilla vs. Thor (2025); Godzilla Destroys the Marvel Universe (2025); Godzilla: Infinity Roar (2026); Godzilla Conquers the Multiverse (2026)
Fantastic Four/Planet of the Apes	2026	20th Century Studios	Planet of the Apes vs. Fantastic Four (2026)
Marvel/Star Wars	2027	Lucasfilm	Star Wars/Marvel: Hope Assembles (2027)

== See also ==
- List of What If issues
- Marvel Cinematic Universe tie-in comics
- Marvel Mangaverse
- Publication history of DC Comics crossover events
