= Archie Bradley =

Archie Bradley may refer to:

- Archie Bradley (baseball) (born 1992), American baseball pitcher
- Archie Bradley (boxer) (1897–1969), Australian boxer and rugby league player
