= Archie Smith =

Archie Smith may refer to:

- Archie Smith (footballer, born 1995), Australian rules football player for Brisbane
- Archie Smith (footballer, born 1872) (1872–1961), Australian rules football player for Collingwood
- Archie Smith, builder and owner of Archie Smith Wholesale Fish Company, a historic site in Sebastian, Florida
- Archie B. Smith (1896–1951), Canadian politician

== See also ==
- Archie Smith, Boy Wonder, an image in The Mysteries of Harris Burdick
- Archibald Smith (disambiguation)
