= Archibald Smith (disambiguation) =

Archibald Smith (1813–1872) was a Scottish mathematician and lawyer.

Archibald Smith may also refer to:

- Archibald Bisset Smith (1878–1917), Scottish recipient of the Victoria Cross
- Archibald D. Smith (1832–1904), member of the Wisconsin State Assembly
- Archibald Levin Smith (1836–1901), British judge and rower

== See also ==
- Archibald Smith Plantation Home, a historic house in Roswell, Georgia
- Archie Smith (disambiguation)
