= Archibald Miller =

Archibald Miller may refer to:

- Archibald Campbell Miller (1836–1898), farmer and political figure in Ontario, Canada
- Archibald Eliot Haswell Miller (1887–1979), painter, illustrator and curator

== See also ==
- Archie Miller (disambiguation)
