= List of Ultimate Comics: Spider-Man story arcs =

Featured here is a chronological list of story arcs in the comic book series Ultimate Comics: Spider-Man, created by Brian Michael Bendis and drawn initially by Sara Pichelli. The series is a sequel to the original Ultimate Spider-Man.

== Ultimate Comics: Spider-Man ==
=== "Who Is Miles Morales?" (#1–5) ===
- Published: September 2011 - December 2011
- Creative team: Brian Michael Bendis, Sara Pichelli, Justin Ponsor
- Plot outline: Eleven months prior to the death of Spider-Man, Norman Osborn creates another spider, deemed Spider 42. The Spider 42 crawls into the bag of the Prowler as he steals from a secure safe containing the research on the spider. Miles Morales, who is now accepted through a lottery into a charter school, goes to visit his uncle Aaron, who unbeknownst to him is the Prowler. The Spider 42 gets out and bites Miles, who convulses and passes out. Miles runs out, only to discover he can turn invisible. After running through the streets and learning of his new extraordinary spider-like powers, Miles goes to visit his friend Ganke Lee, who suggests that he may be a mutant. Jefferson Davis, Miles' dad, takes Miles to the park, where he explains that he doesn't like Miles being around Aaron because he is a thief. Miles later tests his powers by saving a young girl from a burning apartment complex. Two months later, as he is moving into charter school, he dreams about Electro in his dorm and killing him as "Spider-Man". He then wakes up and heads into the gym where a teacher reports that Spider-Man has been shot on the Queensborough Bridge. Miles witnesses Peter Parker's death, then explains to Ganke that he feels guilty, as if he'd decided to become a hero when he got his powers, Spider-Man may not have died. The two attend Peter's funeral, where Miles questions Gwen Stacy why Peter became Spider-Man. Subsequently, Ganke gives Miles his Spider-Man costume that he'd worn for Halloween, and Miles merges victorious in a fight against Kangaroo. Following this, Miles goes out as Spider-Man only to run into Spider-Woman, who takes him into S.H.I.E.L.D. custody. There, Nick Fury reveals that he knows all about Miles and his family, including his uncle's criminal activity. Meanwhile, Electro escapes from custody but is quickly defeated by Miles. S.H.I.E.L.D. releases Miles, and Jessica Drew shows up at school to give him a modified black and red version of the Spider-Man costume.

=== "Scorpion" (#6–12) ===
- Published: January 2012 - July 2012
- Creative team: Brian Michael Bendis, Chris Samnee, Sara Pichelli, David Marquez, Justin Ponsor
- Plot outline: Miles encounters the Prowler, a new villain with an unlikely connection to his family.

=== "United We Stand"/"Divided We Fall" (#13–18) ===
- Published: August 2012 - December 2012
- Creative team: Brian Michael Bendis, David Marquez, Pepe Larraz, Justin Ponsor
- Plot outline: Miles attempts to become a member of the Ultimates when the nation goes to war against Hydra and will do anything it takes to earn the right.

=== "Venom Wars" (#16.1, 19–22) ===
- Published: October 2012, January 2013 - April 2013
- Creative team: Brian Michael Bendis, Sara Pichelli, David Marquez, Justin Ponsor
- Plot outline: In UCSM 16.1, Betty Brant goes over footage of the Spider-Man/Prowler battle from the "Scorpion" arc, looking at whether Spider-Man knew Aaron Davis, the Prowler. She tracks several leads which gets her to Jefferson Davis, who she believes is the new Spidey. J. Jonah Jameson will not take the news out of respect for Peter Parker, but before she can break it, the new Venom kills her. Meanwhile, Maria Hill investigates Betty's death, and Jefferson Davis continues to be hounded by the media as a "hero", all while Miles is being eyed by a new girl. The new Venom blows up Oscorp and arrives at Miles' house, looking for Jefferson, who he believes is Spider-Man. Miles confronts him, and the two have a fight that injures Jefferson. Rio, Miles's mother, follows him to the hospital, while Venom gets away. Gwen and Mary Jane show up to explain Venom's importance, and Miles instantly follows his parents to save them. Venom bursts through the hospital for "Spider-Man", but once the cops and Spider-Man show up, Rio gets in the middle and is accidentally shot. Venom is downed as well, revealed to be Doctor Marcus, who wanted Spider-Man because he "made" him. Rio dies in Miles' arms, leading him to declare "Spider-Man No More".

=== "Spider-Man No More" (#23–28) ===
- Published: May 2013-October 2013
- Creative team: Brian Michael Bendis, David Marquez, Justin Ponsor
- Plot outline: This story starts one year after the events of "Venom Wars". Now fourteen years old, Miles is dating Katie Bishop and has given up being Spider-Man, despite attempts by Jessica Drew to put him back in the role. At a restaurant, Miles meets Gwen Stacy again as a waitress, who unsuccessfully tries to get him back to being Spider-Man. This is all interrupted by a street battle between Bombshell (with her mom's costume), and Cloak and Dagger.

== Collected editions ==
| Title | Material collected | Release date | ISBN |
|---|---|---|---|
| Ultimate Comics: Spider-Man Vol. 1 - Who Is Miles Morales? | Ultimate Comics: Fallout #4, Ultimate Comics: Spider-Man #1-5 | February 2012 | 0-7851-5712-3 |
| Ultimate Comics: Spider-Man Vol. 2 - Scorpion | Ultimate Comics: Spider-Man #6-10 | June 2012 | 0-7851-5714-X |
| Ultimate Comics: Spider-Man Vol. 3 - Divided We Fall, United We Stand | Ultimate Comics: Spider-Man #11-18 | December 2012 | 0-7851-6175-9 |
| Ultimate Comics: Spider-Man Vol. 4 - Venom War | Ultimate Comics: Spider-Man #16.1, 19-22 | July 2013 | 0-7851-6503-7 |
| Ultimate Comics Spider-Man by Brian Michael Bendis Vol. 5 | Ultimate Comics: Spider-Man #23-28 | February 2014 | 978-0785168027 |
| Cataclysm: The Ultimates' Last Stand | Cataclysm: Ultimate Spider-Man #1-3, Cataclysm: The Ultimates' Last Stand #1-5, Cataclysm: Ultimate X-Men #1-3, Cataclysm: Ultimates #1-3, Hunger #1-4, Cataclysm #0.1, Survive #1 | March 2013 | 978-0785189190 |
| Miles Morales: Ultimate Spider-Man Ultimate Collection Book 1 | Ultimate Fallout #4, Ultimate Comics: Spider-Man #1-12, Spider-Men #1-5 | August 2015 | 978-0785197782 |
| Miles Morales: Ultimate Spider-Man Ultimate Collection Book 2 | Ultimate Comics: Spider-Man #13-28 and #16.1 | October 2015 | 978-0785197799 |
| Miles Morales: Ultimate Spider-Man Ultimate Collection Book 3 | Cataclysm: Ultimate Comics Spider-Man #1-3, Ultimate Spider-Man #200, Miles Morales: The Ultimate Spider-Man #1-12 | December 2015 | 978-0785197805 |
| Miles Morales: Ultimate Spider-Man Omnibus | Ultimate Comics: Spider-Man #1-28, 16.1, Spider-Men #1-5, Cataclysm: Ultimate Spider-Man #1-3; Ultimate Spider-Man #200; Miles Morales: Ultimate Spider-Man #1-12; Material from Ultimate Fallout #4 | June 2018 | 978-1302911751 |

== See also ==
- List of Ultimate Spider-Man story arcs
- List of Ultimate Fantastic Four story arcs
- List of Ultimate X-Men story arcs
- Ultimate Comics: Enemy Trilogy
- Ultimate Comics: Fallout
