= Archie Smith Wholesale Fish Company =

- U.S. National Register of Historic Places
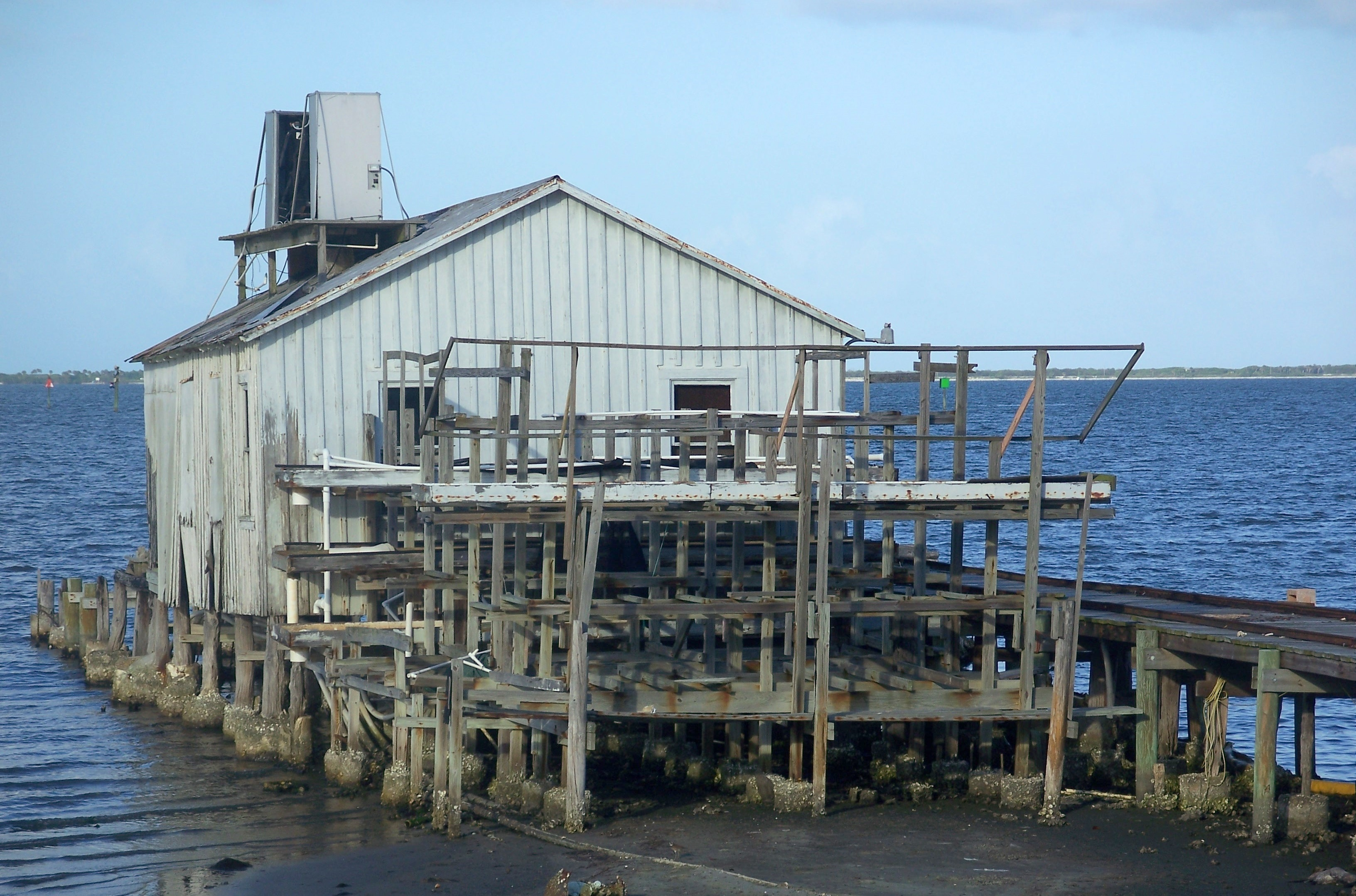

- Location within Florida Location within the United States
- Location: 1740 Indian River Drive, Sebastian, Florida
- Coordinates: 27°49′46″N 80°28′29″W
- Built: 1926
- NRHP reference No.: 94001275
- Added to NRHP: October 28, 1994

The Archie Smith Wholesale Fish Company is a historic site in Sebastian, Florida, United States. It is located at 1740 Indian River Drive. On October 28, 1994, it was added to the National Register of Historic Places.

The building was built in 1926 and purchased by Archie Smith in 1927, who established a fishing business there. The site included an expanded house, a shed for net storage, a crab house, a fish house, and extensive docks. The business office was built in 1927, and the ice house (originally Old Roseland Railroad Depot) was built in 1931.

The business remained in the family until the 2004 hurricanes (especially Frances & Jeanne) caused significant damages to the site. In 2006, the Indian River County Board of Commissioners paid $1.5 million to purchase the property, in hopes of restoring the building and preserving it.

In late 2021, the floor of the ice house caved-in, and it was taken down by the county in March 2022.
