= Archie Goodwin =

Archie Goodwin may refer to:

- Archie Goodwin (basketball) (born 1994), American basketball player
- Archie Goodwin (comics) (1937–1998), American comic book writer and editor
- Archie Goodwin (soccer) (born 2004), Australian soccer player
- Archie Goodwin (character), a fictional detective created by Rex Stout
