= Archie Miller =

Archie Miller may refer to:

- Archie Miller (Medal of Honor) (1878–1921), U.S. Army officer and Medal of Honor recipient
- Archie H. Miller (1886–1958), lieutenant governor of Minnesota
- Archie Miller (basketball) (born 1978), American basketball coach and former player
- Archie Miller (footballer) (1913–2006), Scottish footballer

== See also ==
- Archibald Miller (disambiguation)
