= Archie Clement (footballer) =

English footballer

Personal information
- Full name: Archibald Ernest Clement
- Date of birth: 27 November 1901
- Place of birth: Grays, England
- Date of death: 1984 (aged 82–83)
- Position: Right back

Senior career*
Years	Team	Apps	(Gls)
- Grays Athletic
- Whitstable
- Dartford Town
- Chatham Town
1928	Millwall	2	(0)
1930	Watford	14	(0)
1931–1932	New Brighton	78	(0)
- Yeovil & Petters United
1934	Southport	19	(0)
- Sittingbourne
- Canterbury Waverley
- Chatham Town
- * Club domestic league appearances and goals

Archibald Ernest Clement (born 27 November 1901 – 1984) was an English professional footballer who played as a right back for a number of clubs in the Football League, including Millwall, Watford, New Brighton and Southport.
