= Archie Bradley (boxer) =

Australian boxer, and rugby league footballer

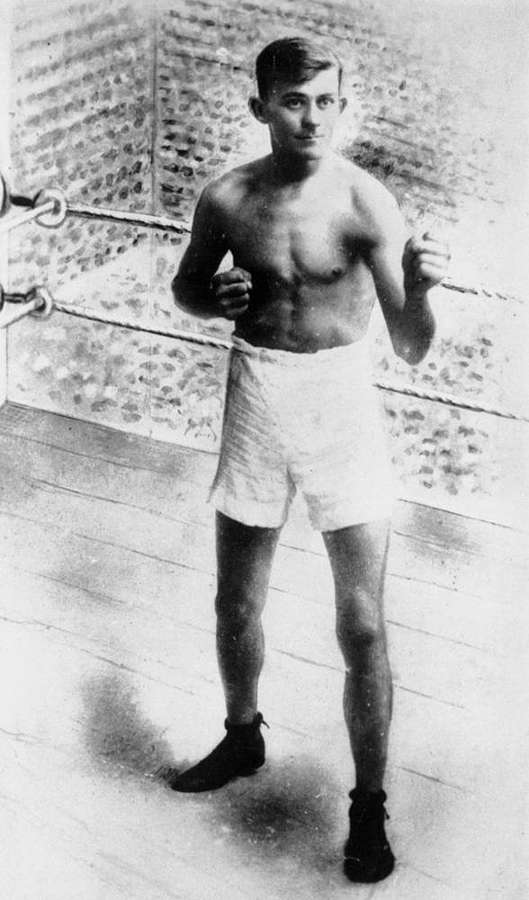
Archie Bradley, circa 1920.

Archie Bradley (4 January 1897 – 27 March 1969) was an Australian professional boxer of the 1920s. Also known as the "Gympie Whirlwind" or the "Gympie Tornado", Archie Bradley was the Australian Welterweight Champion from 1922 to 1924. At the height of his popularity Bradley was afforded huge publicity with whole pages of magazines and newspapers devoted to his boxing career. It was not uncommon for over 12,000 spectators to fill stadiums in Brisbane and Sydney to watch him fight. In the 1920s his stamina and athletic ability as both a boxer and a professional rugby league footballer became legendary.

== Personal life ==
Bradley was born at Wickham Street, Gympie, Queensland on 4 January 1897. He was the seventh of 10 children born to John (b. 1860, Ulverston) and Minnie Bradley (née Gierke, b. 1866, Toowoomba).

== Career ==
In September 1917 Bradley had his first professional fight against Joe Healy at the Theatre Royal in Gympie. After 15 rounds the fight was awarded to Healy in a controversial decision. Bradley went on to win 14 fights in Gympie before travelling to Brisbane in 1918, at the age of 21 years, to further his career. In an eight-month period in Brisbane he had seven wins in seven bouts—against boxers such as "Smiling Georgie" Malouf, Roy Hayward, Bert Secombe and Jimmy Hill. After a loss to Silvino Jamito on a foul in the fifth round, he went on to outpoint Eugene Volaire and knock out the famous Eddie Lynch after nine rounds of furious fighting.

In August 1921 Bradley beat Sid Godfrey on points.

In 1922 he took the welterweight crown from Tommy Uren, and was later described as "probably the greatest fighter to come out of [Queensland]" .

He had a break from boxing from August 1925 to September 1926, but was out of form on his return, losing soundly to Jim Cox.

== Life after boxing ==
After his retirement from boxing, Bradley bred greyhounds for racing, and produced champions including "Archie's Wonder", "Bradley's Best", and "Archie's Gift". He also managed a relative of his who was taking up heavyweight boxing, Col Daley, who went undefeated for at least 29 fights. He kept up his associations with the sport until at least the 1950s, attending tournaments at mission stations.
