= Classic X-Men =

Comic book reprint

- Classic X-Men #1 art cover Art by Art Adams.

Publication information
- Publisher: Marvel Comics
- Schedule: Monthly
- Format: Ongoing series
- Publication date: September 1986 – August 1995
- No. of issues: 110

Creative team
- Created by: Stan Lee; Jack Kirby
- Written by: Chris Claremont and various others
- Artist: Various
- Penciller: Various
- Inker: Various
- Colorist: Various

Classic X-Men, also titled X-Men Classic, is a reprint comic book series published by Marvel Comics between 1986 and 1995. The first volume was a limited series which collected stories from the Thomas/Adams/Palmer run on X-Men (originally published in 1969). The second volume was an unlimited series and reprinted stories from the post–Giant-Size X-Men era (originally published in 1975). Both volumes frequently supplemented the reprinted stories with new material. The series lasted 110 issues.

== Publication history ==
The first volume was three issues published in 1983. Each issue was 48 pages with no ads (as compared to the industry standard of 32 pages with 9 pages of ads) and printed on high-quality Baxter paper instead of the standard newsprint. The series reprinted X-Men #57-63 (necessitating that the stories from issues #59 and 61 be split across two issues) with new gatefold covers, opening pages which served to summarize the events of previous issues, and a foreword by John Byrne. The new material reunited original writer Roy Thomas and original inker Tom Palmer, but penciller Neal Adams was replaced by Mike Zeck.

The second volume was launched in 1986, reprinting the "All-New, All-Different" era of X-Men. Specifically, it reprinted Giant-Size X-Men #1 and Uncanny X-Men #94-206, with the exceptions of #106, 110, 141, 142 and Annuals 3-9. The first 27 issues have various edits and new pages added to tie in with then-current continuity. The new material is often drawn by artists other than those who drew the original story but always written by the writer of the original stories, Chris Claremont. The first 44 issues have new backup stories further delving into and explaining the original stories, mostly written by Chris Claremont or Ann Nocenti and drawn by John Bolton. After Classic X-Men #45, the series was retitled X-Men Classic and from then solely reprinted material from the original Uncanny X-Men series.

The series also included new covers and frontispieces produced by artists such as Art Adams (issues #1-16, 18-23), Steve Lightle (#30-42, 44-52), Mike Mignola (#57-70), and Adam Hughes (issues #71-79).

== Collected editions ==
=== Trade paperbacks ===
Title	Material Collected	Publication Date	ISBN
X-Men: Vignettes, Vol. 1	Back-up stories from Classic X-Men, #1–13	March 2002	ISBN 0-7851-0812-2
X-Men: Vignettes, Vol. 2	Back-up stories from Classic X-Men, #14-25	August 2005	ISBN 0-7851-1728-8
X-Men: Proteus (Marvel Premiere Classic)	Back-up stories from Classic X-Men, #32-33 & 36, plus Uncanny X-Men #125-128	May 2009	ISBN 0-7851-3768-8
Marvel Visionaries: Jim Lee	Back-up story from Classic X-Men, #39, plus Uncanny X-Men #248, #256-258, #268-269, and #273-277.	October 2002	ISBN 0-7851-0921-8
X-Men: The Dark Phoenix Saga	Back-up story from Classic X-Men, #43, plus Uncanny X-Men #129-138, Phoenix: The Untold Story, Bizarre Adventures #27 & What If? (1977) #27	August 2010	ISBN 0-7851-4913-9
X-Men Classic Omnibus	Back-up stories, new pages and edits from Classic X-Men 1-44; Material from Marvel Fanfare (1982) #60	December 2017	ISBN 1-302-90811-1
X-Men Classic: The Complete Collection Vol. 1	Back-up stories, new pages and edits from Classic X-Men #1-23	December 2018	ISBN 1-302-91367-0
X-Men Classic: The Complete Collection Vol. 2	Back-up stories, new pages and edits from Classic X-Men #24-44	December 2019	ISBN 1-302-92058-8
