= Uncanny X-Men 94 =

1975 comic book issue

Uncanny X-Men #94
- Cover of Uncanny X-Men #94

Creative team
- Written by: Chris Claremont
- Penciller: Dave Cockrum
- Inker: Bob McLeod
- Letterer: Tom Orzechowski
- Colorist: Phil Rachelson
- Editor: Len Wein

Uncanny X-Men #94 (originally published simply as The X-Men) is a comic book starring the X-Men that was published by Marvel Comics in August 1975. From issues #67–93, cover dated December 1970 to April 1975, the X-Men series consisted of reprints due to lack of sales. In May 1975, Giant-Size X-Men #1 was published, and Professor X recruited a new team consisting of several foreign nationals to save the X-Men. With issue #94, the magazine was revived, and all of the original X-Men quit, save team leader Cyclops, and are replaced by such "All-New, All-Different" X-Men as Storm, Wolverine, Nightcrawler, and Colossus. A former X-Men adversary, Banshee, also joins the team at this point. Sunfire returns to Japan in this issue, and Thunderbird dies in issue #95.

== Publication history ==
Uncanny X-Men #94 is the beginning of writer Chris Claremont's 16-year run on the title. Under his guidance, Uncanny X-Men would become the industry's top title, and, along with Spider-Man, the driving force behind Marvel Comics for the next 20 years.

Uncanny X-Men #94 was reprinted in Essential X-Men Volume 1 along with Giant-Size X-Men #1 and issues #95–119. It was also reprinted in Marvel Masterworks Uncanny X-Men Volume 1 along with Giant Size X-Men #1 and issues #95–100. In 2006, Giant Size X-Men #4 reprinted issue #94 along with other Thunderbird related issues and a new Thunderbird story by Chris Claremont. In 2004, Marvel released a CD containing issue #94 called SNAP! X-Men. Issue #94 was also reprinted in Classic X-Men #2 (1986), Marvel Masterworks #11, and Essential X-Men #1 (1996).

== Plot ==
Professor Xavier calls a meeting of the X-Men. There, Sunfire clarifies that he only agreed to help Xavier save the X-Men and has no intention of becoming a member. Banshee also proposes to go on his way, but Professor X and Cyclops convince him to stay. Angel breaks the news that he, Marvel Girl, Iceman, Havok, and Polaris are confident enough in their powers to leave the X-Men. Cyclops wants to leave with Marvel Girl, but realizes with his destructive power he has no chance at living a normal life. The next day, Cyclops leads the new X-Men to the Danger Room for their first training session. Over weeks of training, the new recruits learn to work as a team, but Cyclops's harsh remonstrances at any failings cause tension.

In the Colorado Rockies, Count Nefaria and the Ani-Men seize control of the military base in Mount Valhalla and threaten to launch the USA's entire inventory of nuclear missiles unless every nation of the world pays Nefaria a ransom. The United States Air Force contacts the Avengers for help. Unable to oblige, the Avengers pass the mission on to the X-Men. The X-Men pile into the Blackbird and head to Valhalla. There, General Fredericks informs them that Nefaria has ignorantly armed the Doomsmith System, which controls Valhalla's nuclear missiles and can only be shut down within a certain window, which closes in 52 minutes. As the Blackbird enters Valhalla's defense perimeter, Nefaria disables it with the defense systems, sending the X-Men into a fatal fall.

== Collectibility ==
There are no known extant copies of Uncanny X-Men #94 that rate higher than a 9.8 on the Comic Guaranty LLC grading scale. As of June 1, 2013 there were 18 copies that had been graded at 9.8. A copy with a 9.6 rating was sold for $4,450 on eBay in 2004. In 2010 Walter Durajlija of Ontario's Big B Comics sold a copy for $26,500.

== Collected editions ==
=== Marvel Masterworks ===
Title	Volume	Material collected	Publication date	ISBN
Marvel Masterworks: The Uncanny X-Men	1	Giant-Size X-Men #1; Uncanny X-Men #94–100	December 2009	978-0785137023

=== Epic Collections ===
Vol	Title	Material collected	Publication date	ISBN
5	Second Genesis	Giant Size X-Men #1; Uncanny X-Men #94-110; Iron Fist #14-15; Marvel Team-Up #53, #69-70, Annual #1; material from FOOM #10	April 11, 2017	978-1302903909

=== Essentials ===
Title	Volume	Material collected	Publication date	ISBN
Essential X-Men	1	X-Men #94–119; Giant-Size X-Men #1	May 2008	978-0785132554

=== Panini Pocket Books ===
Title	Material collected	Publication date	ISBN
Second Genesis	Giant-Size X-Men #1; Uncanny X-Men #94-103	July 2004	978-1904419402
