= Giant-Size X-Men =

Special issue of the X-Men comic book series by Marvel

Cover of Giant-Size X-Men #1 (May 1975) by Gil Kane and Dave Cockrum

Giant-Size X-Men #1 is a special issue of the X-Men comic book series, published by Marvel Comics in 1975. It was written by Len Wein and illustrated by Dave Cockrum. Chris Claremont contributed to the plot, having conceived the idea of Polaris using her powers to propel Krakoa into space, but went uncredited. Though not a regular issue, it contained the first new X-Men story in five years, titled "Second Genesis." The issue serves as a link between the original X-Men and a new team. Chronologically it is placed after X-Men #66 and before X-Men #94. The 68-page book was published with a May 1975 cover date and distributed to newsstands in February of that year. The issue has been cited as a landmark in the Bronze Age of Comic Books, and is notable for expanding the membership of the X-Men from beyond the white American cast to one of a more international flavor, an attempt to attract more readers from outside the US, even if some characters were portrayed somewhat stereotypically.

== Publication history ==
The X-Men title stopped producing new stories after #66 in March 1970. From December 1970 through April 1975, Marvel reprinted many of the older X-Men issues as #67–93. Following the May publication of Giant-Size X-Men #1, Marvel began again publishing new issues of X-Men with #94 in August 1975.

The comic also collects reprints from X-Men #43, #47 and #57.

== Plot ==
The story opens in medias res, with Professor X recruiting a new team of X-Men, to rescue the original X-Men (Marvel Girl, Iceman and Angel, plus X-Men recruits Havok and Polaris), who had disappeared on a mission to the island of Krakoa, with only their leader Cyclops escaping. The new team consists of Sunfire and Banshee, who had been introduced in earlier X-Men comics; Wolverine, who had made his first appearance in The Incredible Hulk #180 (Oct. 1974); and the newly created Storm, Nightcrawler, Colossus, and Thunderbird. These members are gathered from all over the world, and Professor X uses his telepathic powers to teach them all English so that they can communicate with each other.

The team soon learns that Krakoa is not just an island, but a giant mutant as well. Despite personality clashes among the individual members, the new team succeeds in rescuing the old X-Men and destroying the entity by shooting it into outer space with Polaris' power. The issue ends by posing the question of the future of a 13-member X-Men team.

The later storyline "Deadly Genesis" offers a ret-con of this story, which tells how Professor X had initially recruited a different team before the events in this issue.

== Credits ==
- Story, edits — Len Wein
- Pencils, cover inks — Dave Cockrum
- Cover pencils — Gil Kane
- Inks — Dave Cockrum & Peter Iro
- Letters — John Costanza
- Colors — Glynis Wein

== Reprint ==
The "Second Genesis" story was reprinted in Classic X-Men #1 in September 1986, with substantial editing to reduce its length, and a new backup story by Claremont and John Bolton bridging the gap between this and the following issue, Uncanny X-Men #94.

== Collected editions ==
=== Marvel Masterworks ===
Title	Volume	Material collected	Publication date	ISBN
Masterworks: The Uncanny X-Men	1	Giant-Size X-Men #1; Uncanny X-Men #94–100	December 2009	978-0785137023

=== Epic Collections ===
Vol	Title	Material collected	Publication date	ISBN
5	Second Genesis	Giant Size X-Men #1; Uncanny X-Men #94–110; Iron Fist #14–15; Marvel Team-Up #53, #69–70, Annual #1; material from FOOM #10	April 11, 2017	978-1302903909

=== Essentials ===
Title	Volume	Material collected	Publication date	ISBN
Essential X-Men	1	X-Men #94–119; Giant-Sized X-Men #1	May 2008	978-0785132554

=== Panini Pocket Books ===
Title	Material collected	Publication date	ISBN
Second Genesis	Giant Size X-Men #1; Uncanny X-Men #94–103	July 2004	978-1904419402

== Second issue ==
Marvel published a second issue of Giant-Size X-Men later in 1975. This November issue had no new material, instead featuring reprints of stories from X-Men #57, #58, and #59, written by Roy Thomas and illustrated by Neal Adams.

== Third and fourth issues ==
In 2005, Marvel published two new Giant Size X-Men issues to celebrate the 30th anniversary of the original. Issue #3 in July contained a story written by Joss Whedon and illustrated by Neal Adams. The issue also reprinted several older X-Men team-ups: the group's appearance in Fantastic Four #28, an Avengers guest appearance in X-Men #9 and a story featuring Spider-Man in X-Men #35. In November, Chris Claremont penned a story for issue #4, with artwork by Neal Adams. It also reprinted material related to the death of Thunderbird from X-Men #94–95, Classic X-Men #3 and Uncanny X-Men #193.

== 40th Anniversary edition hardcover ==
The series has also been collected into a hardcover paperback titled Giant-Size X-Men: 40th Anniversary Edition. The hardcover collects Giant-Size X-Men #1, 3–4; Classic X-Men #1; X-Men Origins: Colossus; X-Men Origins: Wolverine; X-Men: Deadly Genesis #1–6; What If? (1989) #9, #23; and material from X-Men Gold #1. The second Giant-Sized issue was likely omitted, due to it being reprints of X-Men #57–59. The 440-page paperback was released June 2015. ISBN 978-0-7851-9777-5)

== Krakoa ==
=== Dawn of X ===
Five Giant-Size X-Men one-shots, all written by Jonathan Hickman, were released as part of Marvel's 2019 Dawn of X relaunch of its X-Men books between February and September 2020. The first, Giant Size X-Men: Jean Grey and Emma Frost, was drawn by Russell Dauterman and colored by Matt Wilson. The second, Giant-Size X-Men: Nightcrawler, was drawn by Alan Davis and colored by Carlos Lopez. The third, Giant-Size X-Men: Magneto, was drawn by Ramon Perez and colored by David Curiel. The fourth, Giant-Size X-Men: Fantomex, was drawn and colored by Rod Reis. The fifth, Giant-Size X-Men: Storm, was drawn by Dauterman and colored by Wilson. A trade paperback collecting the five comics was published in December 2020.

==== Comics ====
Issue	Publication date	Writer	Artist	Colorist	Comic Book Roundup rating	Estimated sales to North American retailers (first month)
Giant Size X-Men: Jean Grey and Emma Frost	February 26, 2020	Jonathan Hickman	Russell Dauterman	Matt Wilson	8.6 by 19 professional critics	63,077
Giant-Size X-Men: Nightcrawler	March 25, 2020	Jonathan Hickman	Alan Davis	Carlos Lopez	7.5 by 16 professional critics	46,861
Giant-Size X-Men: Magneto	July 15, 2020	Jonathan Hickman	Ramon Perez	David Curiel	7.7 by 13 professional critics	Data not yet available
Giant-Size X-Men: Fantomex	August 5, 2020	Jonathan Hickman	Rod Reis		8.2 by 7 professional critics	Data not yet available
Giant-Size X-Men: Storm	September 16, 2020	Jonathan Hickman	Russell Dauterman	Matt Wilson	8.7 by 12 professional critics	Data not yet available

=== Destiny of X ===
In 2022, a sixth Krakoan Giant-Size X-Men one-shot, Giant-Size X-Men: Thunderbird, was published as a part of the Destiny of X event. The issue was co-written by Steve Orlando and Nyla Rose and drawn by David Cutler.

== 50th Anniversary Event ==
To commemorate the 50th anniversary of the first Giant-Size X-Men issue, it was announced that five one-shots written by writing duo Collin Kelly and Jackson Lanzing and illustrated by Adam Kubert, C.F. Villa and Francesco Manna, was released between May and August 2025. The event involves Ms. Marvel being pulled by Legion in a battle across time, where she encountered the X-Men during their most iconic moments in history and alternate timelines, including the "Second Genesis" and "The Dark Phoenix Saga" storylines and the Age of Apocalypse and "House of M" continuities. The event began with Giant-Size X-Men #1 and be followed by Giant-Size Dark Phoenix Saga #1, Giant-Size Age of Apocalypse #1, Giant-Size House of M #1 and Giant-Size X-Men #2. In addition, each issue features a back-up Revelations story.

=== Issues ===
Title	Issue	Writer	Artist	Colorist	Publication date
Giant-Size X-Men (vol. 3) (Note: Issue #1 also contained a Revelations story by Al Ewing, Sara Pichelli and Federico Blee. Issue #2 also contained a Revelations story by Jed MacKay and CAFU.)	1	Collin Kelly; Jackson Lanzing	Adam Kubert	Laura Martin	May 28, 2025
Giant-Size Dark Phoenix Saga (Note: Issue also contains a Revelations story by Steve Foxe and Lucas Werneck.)	1	Collin Kelly; Jackson Lanzing	Rod Reis		June 11, 2025
Giant-Size Age of Apocalypse (Note: Issue also contains a Revelations story by Jeph Loeb and Simone Di Meo.)	1	Collin Kelly; Jackson Lanzing	C.F. Villa; Rafael Loureiro	Edgar Delgado	June 25, 2025
Giant-Size House of M (Note: Issue also contains a Revelations story by Saladin Ahmed, Martín Cóccolo and Matt Wilson.)	1	Collin Kelly; Jackson Lanzing	Francesco Manna	Edgar Delgado	July 16, 2025
Giant-Size X-Men (vol. 3)	2	Collin Kelly; Jackson Lanzing	Adam Kubert	Laura Martin	August 13, 2025
