= Uncanny X-Men =

Marvel comic book series

- Cover to The X-Men #1 (Sept. 1963). Art by Jack Kirby.

Publication information
- Publisher: Marvel Comics
- Schedule: Monthly
- Format: Ongoing series
- Genre: Superhero
- Publication date: 1963 – present List: (vol. 1) September 1963 – December 2011 (vol. 2) January – December 2012 (vol. 3) April 2013 – September 2015 (vol. 4) January 2016 – March 2017 (vol. 5) January – September 2019 (vol. 6) October 2024 - present
- No. of issues: List: (vol. 1): 544 and 18 Annuals (vol. 2): 20 (vol. 3): 36 and 1 Annual (vol. 4): 19 (vol. 5): 22 and 1 Annual (vol. 6): Ongoing

Creative team
- Created by: Stan Lee; Jack Kirby
- Written by: List: (vol. 1): Stan Lee Roy Thomas Arnold Drake Chris Claremont Scott Lobdell Chuck Austen Ed Brubaker Matt Fraction Kieron Gillen (vol. 2): Kieron Gillen (vol. 3): Brian Bendis (vol. 4): Cullen Bunn (vol. 5): Ed Brisson Matthew Rosenberg Kelly Thompson (vol. 6): Gail Simone
- Penciller: List: (vol. 1): Jack Kirby Werner Roth Don Heck Neal Adams Dave Cockrum John Byrne Paul Smith John Romita Jr. Alan Davis Marc Silvestri Rick Leonardi Jim Lee Whilce Portacio Joe Madureira Salvador Larroca Billy Tan Mike Choi Terry Dodson Greg Land Chris Bachalo (vol. 2): Carlos Pacheco Greg Land Daniel Acuña (vol. 3): Chris Bachalo Kris Anka (vol. 4): Greg Land Ken Lashley Edgar Salazar (vol. 5): Mahmud Asrar R.B. Silva Yıldıray Çınar Pere Pérez Salvador Larroca Carlos Gomez Carlos Villa (vol. 6): David Marquez
- Inker: List: (vol. 1): Paul Reinman Dick Ayers George Tuska Tom Palmer Joe Rubinstein Bob McLeod Terry Austin Dan Green Mark Farmer Rachel Dodson Jay Leisten (vol. 2) Cam Smith Jay Leisten (vol. 3) Tim Townsend (vol. 4): Jay Leisten Ed Tadeo (vol. 5): Adriano Di Benedetto Yıldıray Çınar Pere Perez Salvador Larroca Carlos Gomez

Uncanny X-Men, originally published as The X-Men, is an American comic book series published by Marvel Comics since 1963, and is the longest-running series in the X-Men comics franchise. It features a team of superheroes called the X-Men, a group of mutants with superhuman abilities led and taught by Professor X.

The title was created by Stan Lee and Jack Kirby, met with a lukewarm reception, and eventually became a reprints-only book in 1970. Interest was rekindled with 1975's Giant-Size X-Men #1 and the debut of a new, international team. Initially under the guidance of artist Dave Cockrum, writer Len Wein, and especially writer Chris Claremont whose 16-year stint began with August 1975's Uncanny X-Men #94, the series grew in popularity worldwide, eventually spawning a franchise with numerous spin-off "X-books" including The New Mutants, X-Factor, Excalibur, X-Force, Generation X, and other flagship titles like the simply titled X-Men (later New X-Men and X-Men Legacy), Astonishing X-Men, All-New X-Men, Amazing X-Men, Extraordinary X-Men, X-Men Blue and X-Men Gold.

== Publication history ==
=== 1963–1970: Original run ===
Created by writer-editor Stan Lee and artist Jack Kirby, the series launched in September 1963. Lee originally wanted to title the book The Merry Mutants, but Marvel's editorial team insisted on using X-Men instead. The first issue introduced the original five X-Men (Warren Worthington III/Angel, Hank McCoy/Beast, Scott Summers/Cyclops, Robert "Bobby" Drake/Iceman, and Jean Grey/Marvel Girl) and their teacher, Charles Xavier/Professor X as well as their nemesis, the supervillain Erik Magnus Lehnsherr/Magneto. Although Lee would deny it, it was noticed by contemporary writer Arnold Drake, that the concept of the series emulated his own earlier series for National Periodical Publications's (now DC Comics) Doom Patrol, in many respects. However, National's editorial staff did not support Drake's concerns.

Initially published bimonthly, it became a monthly with issue #14 (November 1965). Lee's run lasted 19 issues, and featured the X-Men battling villains such as Magneto's Brotherhood of Mutants (which included the siblings Wanda Maximoff/Scarlet Witch and Pietro Maximoff/Quicksilver); the Sentinels, giant robots programmed to destroy all mutants, and their creator Bolivar Trask; and Cain Marko/Juggernaut, Xavier's stepbrother transformed by a mystical gem and seeking revenge on Xavier.

The series was placed firmly in the Marvel Universe, with guest appearances by Namor the Sub-Mariner in #6 and the Avengers in #9. The jungle adventure hero Kevin Plunder/Ka-Zar and the Savage Land were introduced in issue #10. Roy Thomas wrote the series from #20–43 (May 1966 – April 1968). Thomas and artist Werner Roth created Sean Cassidy/Banshee in #28 (Jan. 1967). The X-Men #45 (June 1968) featured a crossover with The Avengers #53 (June 1968). After brief runs by Gary Friedrich and Arnold Drake – the latter of whom introduced the new X-Men Lorna Dane/Polaris and Alex Summers/Havok, and during which the series adopted a new logo designed by Jim Steranko – Thomas returned to the series with issue #55 and was joined by artist Neal Adams the following issue for an acclaimed run of stories. After a battle with the Hulk in issue #66 (March 1970), the title ceased publishing original material and featured reprints in issues #67–93 (December 1970 – April 1975).

=== 1970–1975: Other appearances ===
Despite the title going into reprints for the next five years between #67–93, the X-Men continued to appear in other Marvel titles throughout this period in a guest-starring capacity or cameo appearance, either as a team or in solo adventures.

Angel appeared without the X-Men in a three-part story involving the murder of his father at the hands of his uncle, Burt Worthington, a.k.a. the Dazzler, in Ka-Zar #2 (Dec. 1970) and #3 (March 1971), and Marvel Tales #30 (April 1971).

Iceman made a guest appearance in Amazing Spider-Man #92 (Jan. 1971), where he battles Spider-Man after mistakenly assuming he abducted Gwen Stacy. Later, after realizing his error, they team up against corrupt politician, Sam Bullitt. Iceman appears alone once again in Marvel Team-Up #23 (July 1974), where he teams up with the Human Torch to battle Equinox. Cyclops, Marvel Girl, and Angel also make a brief appearance.

The Beast starred in his own series in Amazing Adventures #11–17 (March 1972 – March 1973) after accepting a position with the Brand Corporation, and decides to leave the X-Men for good. The original team appeared briefly in a flashback in #11 (March 1972) and in a present-day cameo appearance in #15 (November 1972). Professor Xavier and Marvel Girl briefly appeared in Amazing Adventures #12 (May 1972), and Angel helped Beast defeat the Griffin in Amazing Adventures #15. After his run on that series ended, Beast battled against the Hulk alone in The Incredible Hulk #161 (March 1973), concluding a storyline which began in Amazing Adventures.

Havok and Polaris, as recounted in a flashback in Incredible Hulk #150 (April 1972), leave the X-Men after a bitter quarrel with Iceman and move to New Mexico. In a present-day appearance in the same issue, they encounter and battle the Hulk, who mistakes Polaris for his former lover Jarella, and a biker gang.

As a team, the X-Men assisted Spider-Man in capturing Morbius in Marvel Team-Up #4 (Sept. 1972), written by Gerry Conway, after one of Xavier's colleagues is abducted by the vampire. In Adventure into Fear #20 (Feb. 1974), it is recounted in a flashback how Morbius escaped from the X-Men's mansion. Professor Xavier and Cyclops appeared in a brief cameo.

They appeared in The Avengers #110–111 (April–May 1973), written by Steve Englehart, where Professor Xavier and the X-Men are abducted by Magneto after an ambush at Xavier's mansion, and later rescued by the Avengers, Daredevil, and the Black Widow. Soon after, members of the X-Men, including Iceman, Angel, Beast, Havok and Polaris, and members of the Brotherhood of Evil Mutants are secretly being abducted by a group of hooded figures known as the Secret Empire. At this point, only Professor Xavier, Cyclops and Marvel Girl remain active, and, after a brief cameo at the end of Incredible Hulk #172 (Feb. 1974), where they discover an unconscious Juggernaut after a battle with the Hulk, seek out the help of Captain America and the Falcon. This led to the first "Secret Empire" storyline, which ran in Captain America #172–175 (April–July 1974), also written by Steve Englehart.

Professor Xavier made a few brief appearances of his own without the X-Men during this time. In The Avengers #88 (May 1971), written by Roy Thomas and Harlan Ellison, he made a cameo appearance assisting Reed Richards and General Thunderbolt Ross in containing the Hulk, and later appeared briefly onscreen in Shanna the She-Devil #5 (Aug. 1973) to warn Shanna of an unknown mutant threat, Nekra. In The Defenders #15–16 (Sept–Oct. 1974), written by Len Wein, Xavier teamed up with the Defenders to battle against Magneto and his reformed Brotherhood of Evil Mutants. It was in this battle that Magneto and the Brotherhood were reduced to infancy by Alpha the Ultimate Mutant. Xavier made one final solo appearance during this period in Giant-Size Fantastic Four #4 (Feb. 1975), where he assisted the Fantastic Four in subduing Jamie Madrox, the Multiple Man.

=== 1975–1991: Chris Claremont era ===
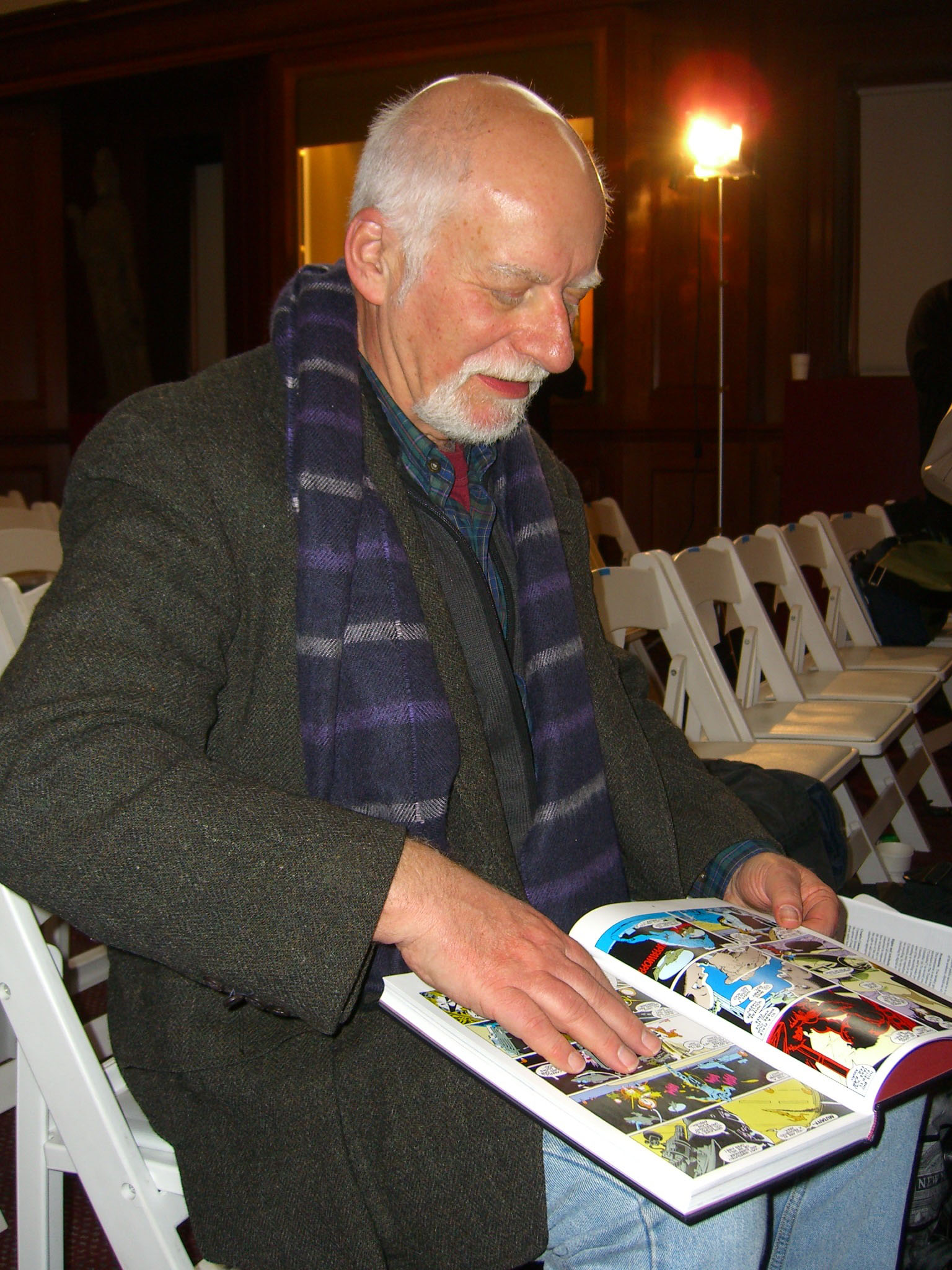
Writer Chris Claremont looks through a copy of a hardcover X-Men volume that collects many of the issues he wrote, March 2012.

X-Men was relaunched in May 1975 with Giant-Size X-Men #1, by Len Wein and Dave Cockrum. The title featured a new, international team consisting of Scott Summers (Cyclops) of the United States, Ireland's Sean Cassidy (Banshee), the Japanese mutant Shiro Yoshida (Sunfire), and James "Logan" Howlett (Wolverine) from Canada, along with new characters Ororo Munroe (Storm) from Kenya, the German Kurt Wagner (Nightcrawler), Piotr "Peter" Rasputin (Colossus) from Russia in the Soviet Union, and John Proudstar (Thunderbird), a Native American. The original plan was to continue Giant-Size X-Men as a quarterly, but instead original stories were printed in the book, again initially bimonthly. Chris Claremont's first issue as writer, #94, featured all the original X-Men leaving the team with the exception of Cyclops. Sunfire also left, having agreed to assist the X-Men on one successful mission only. Thunderbird was killed in #95. Moira MacTaggert, a human ally of the X-Men, and later to be established as a former fiancée of Xavier, debuted in #96. Marvel Girl became Phoenix in issue #101. This was followed by the first Shi'ar space opera story. Cockrum was replaced as penciller by John Byrne as of #108. Byrne became co-plotter, and during his run the series became a monthly title again.

The series title was changed to The Uncanny X-Men with issue #114 (October 1978).

For the remainder of the decade, the X-Men fought enemies such as Steven Lang and his Sentinels, Magneto, Banshee's cousin Black Tom Cassidy and Cain Marko/Juggernaut, the Shi'ar Erik the Red and the Imperial Guard, Arcade, Wolverine's former colleagues, the Canadian superhero team Alpha Flight, and MacTaggert's son Proteus. In 2010, Comics Bulletin ranked Claremont and Byrne's run on The X-Men second on its list of the "Top 10 1970s Marvels".

The "Dark Phoenix Saga" in 1980 led to a change in the line-up of the team, with the death of Phoenix (Jean Grey), and Cyclops leaving the team to mourn her. Comics writers and historians Roy Thomas and Peter Sanderson observed that "'The Dark Phoenix Saga' is to Claremont and Byrne what 'the Galactus Trilogy' is to Stan Lee and Jack Kirby. It is a landmark in Marvel history, showcasing its creators' work at the height of their abilities." The storyline also saw the introduction of recurring antagonists the Hellfire Club, and its Inner Circle consisting of Sebastian Shaw, Emma Frost, Harry Leland, Donald Pierce, along with Mastermind, previously a member of Magneto's Brotherhood. Teenage mutant Kitty Pryde/Shadowcat was introduced in #129 (Jan. 1980) and joined the X-Men in #139. Alison Blaire/Dazzler, a disco-singing, roller-skating mutant, was introduced in #130 (Feb. 1980), but did not join the team, instead having a solo title.

A new Brotherhood of Evil Mutants, led by Mystique, was introduced in the "Days of Future Past" storyline (#141–142, Jan–Feb 1981) in which a time-travelling Kitty Pryde tried to avert a dystopian future caused by the Brotherhood assassinating presidential candidate Senator Robert Kelly. Byrne plotted the story wanting to depict the Sentinels as a genuine threat to the existence of the mutant race. He then left the series after #143, being replaced by a returning Cockrum, who in turn was succeeded by Paul Smith and John Romita Jr.

By the mid-1980s, The Uncanny X-Men had become one of the best-selling American comic books, turning many of the writers and illustrators into industry stars and leading to numerous spin-offs and miniseries.

Erik Magnus Lehnsherr/Magneto was gradually revealed to be more complex: #150 established that he was a survivor of the Holocaust, and in #161 it is shown that he and Professor Charles Xavier had known each other before Xavier had founded the X-Men. Anna Marie LeBeau/Rogue, a member of Raven Darkholme/Mystique's Brotherhood of Evil Mutants, defected to the X-Men in #171 (July 1983). Raven Darkholme/Mystique's Brotherhood of Evil Mutants changed sides and became the government-backed Freedom Force in #199. Their first action was to capture Magneto, who had begun associating with the X-Men during the "Secret Wars II" crossover. Magneto surrenders himself, but escapes after his trial is abandoned, he takes over the headmastership of the school after Xavier leaves for space in #200 (Dec. 1985).

The Morlocks, a group of disfigured mutants living underneath New York City, were introduced in #169 (May 1983). Storm became their leader in #170. She was de-powered accidentally by government forces aiming for Rogue, and met Forge, a mutant with the power of invention. After Storm left the team temporarily to return to her native Africa, Nightcrawler became field leader.

The character Rachel Summers from the future dystopia presented in "Days of Future Past" had been shown to arrive in the present day in New Mutants #18, and then made appearances in Uncanny X-Men from #184 on and was revealed to be Cyclops' daughter.

Claremont attempted to write Scott Summers/Cyclops out of the series, by having him marry Madelyne Pryor in #175 (Nov. 1983); she gave birth to his son in #201 (Jan. 1986). The X-Factor series was launched two months later and featured the original five X-Men. This meant the resurrection of Jean Grey (performed by retcon, the character appearing from #101 having never really been her), and having Scott Summers/Cyclops abandon his wife and child. Claremont strongly objected to the latter, and was hostile towards the title until Louise Simonson became writer.

Artist Arthur Adams began a long association with the team by drawing The Uncanny X-Men Annual #9 (1985) and would serve as the artist on several of the Annuals in the next few years.

The end of 1986 saw the first crossover between X-Men titles, the "Mutant Massacre", which saw a large number of Morlocks killed by the Marauders, acting under orders from the mysterious Nathaniel Essex/Mister Sinister The late 1980s saw several other crossovers: 1988's "Fall of the Mutants" and 1989's "Inferno", which resolved the issue of Madelyne Pryor by revealing her to have been a clone of Jean Grey created by Sinister. The cast was shaken up, with the addition of Psylocke, Dazzler, Longshot and Havok in early 1987, as well as the first appearances of NPR-TV reporter Manoli Wetherell in #226 (1988), new teenage mutant Jubilation Lee/Jubilee in #244 (1989), and Remy LeBeau/Gambit in Uncanny X-Men #266 (1990). The X-Men left their traditional residence in Westchester County, New York, and lived variously on Alcatraz, Muir Island, and the Australian outback. The "X-Tinction Agenda" crossover, in which the X-Men, X-Factor and the New Mutants fight against the government of Genosha for mutant rights, was published in the fall of 1990.

The title became twice-monthly from 1988 to 1990 every summer, and helped to launch the careers of artists Marc Silvestri and Jim Lee. In 1991 another X-Men title was launched, titled simply X-Men; both titles were now published monthly. Claremont wrote the first three issue of this series, in which the X-Factor and X-Men teams reunited with Professor Xavier at the school. Claremont left Marvel after disputes with Bob Harras and artist Jim Lee (of X-Men). Claremont's final issue of Uncanny X-Men was #279, during the "Muir Island Saga", which is set before those events.

=== 1991–2011: Post-Claremont era ===
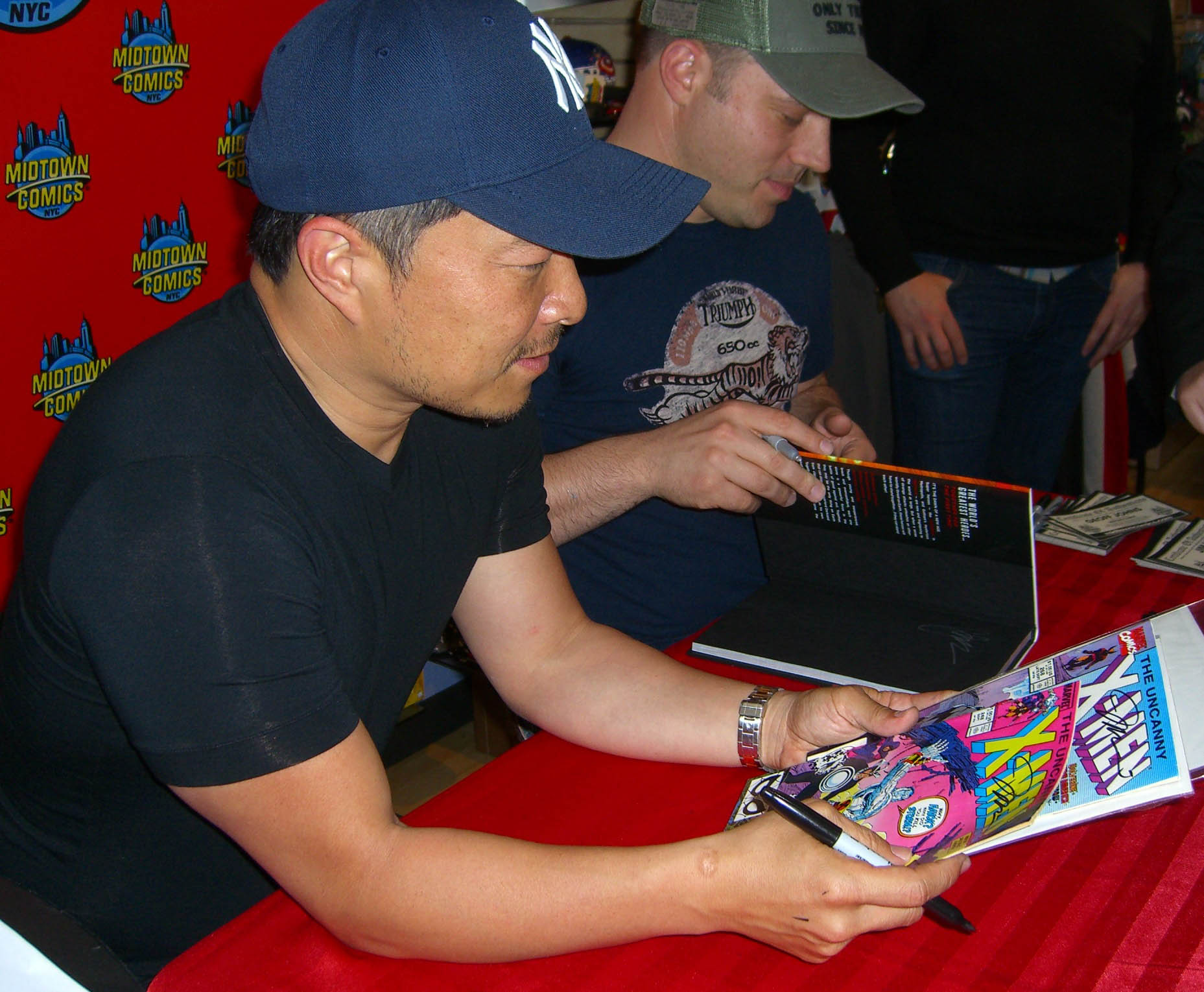
Jim Lee holding some of the 1990s issues of the series on which he rose to stardom as an artist

After Claremont's run, the X-Men were divided into two color-coded squads, with a Blue team headlining the adjectiveless X-Men title, while the Gold team, consisting of Warren Worthington III/Archangel, Piotr "Peter" Rasputin/Colossus, Jean Grey, Robert "Bobby" Drake/Iceman and Ororo Munroe/Storm, appeared in Uncanny. This roster was later joined by Lucas Bishop, another refugee from the future. After Claremont's departure, Jim Lee continued as plotter, while John Byrne scripted from #281–286. Byrne was replaced as scripter from #287 by Scott Lobdell, who was fully credited as writer from #289. The "X-Cutioner's Song" crossover was released in the fall of 1992 and resulted in the outbreak of the Legacy Virus, a mutant-specific plague which continued as a story element in X-Men comics until 2001.

Crossovers continued through the 1990s. The "Fatal Attractions" crossover of 1993 saw the X-Men battle Magneto again, and the "Phalanx Covenant" story of 1994 focused mostly on the techno-organic Phalanx. Uncanny X-Men briefly ceased publication during the "Age of Apocalypse" storyline in 1995, which dealt with an alternative present created by a time-travelling assassin killing Xavier; it was replaced by Astonishing X-Men. Lobdell was writing X-Men as well from 1995.

Lobdell was replaced by Steven T. Seagle with issue #350 (Dec. 1997). He was replaced in turn with Alan Davis, as plotter, from issue #366 (Mar. 1999) to #380. Davis's run included "the Twelve" crossover from #370–375, in which Apocalypse sought the only 12 mutants, which also ran in his X-Men title, again being treated as a biweekly publication. As part of the Revolution relaunch, Chris Claremont made a brief return from #381 (June 2000) to #389, at which point he transferred to the new X-Treme X-Men title, as Grant Morrison took over X-Men (vol. 2) and that became the flagship X-Men title. From 2001, Lobdell made a short return, and then Joe Casey and Chuck Austen wrote runs into 2004. The title became bimonthly from 2003 to 2004.

The X-Men: Reload reshuffle of titles in 2004 led to Claremont returning to Uncanny with issue #444. The stories addressed the new status quo established by Morrison. Claremont remained until #473. His final story was "End of the Greys" in 2006, as part of the "Decimation" storyline, where the vast majority of mutants had lost their powers. He was replaced by Ed Brubaker, who wrote a 12-part epic space opera story "The Rise and Fall of the Shi'ar Empire", as a follow-up to his miniseries X-Men: Deadly Genesis. After this, the title led into the "Messiah Complex" crossover event, dealing with the first mutant birth since the Decimation.

Matt Fraction became co-author from #500, and sole author from #504. The entire X-Men team relocated to San Francisco – first to the city, and then, after the "Utopia" crossover with Dark Avengers, to an island named Utopia in San Francisco Bay. The Nation X storyline focused on the return of the re-powered Magneto, and him coming to Utopia. The Second Coming crossover saw the return of Hope Summers, the baby from the "Messiah Complex" arc, to the present day, as a young adult; and the emergence of the "Five Lights", the first new mutants to have arisen (apart from Hope) since the Decimation. Nightcrawler was killed during this storyline and Beast left in protest after his discovery of Cyclops' secret death squad, X-Force.

Kieron Gillen took over co-authorship of the series with #531, and became sole writer from #534.1.

=== 2012: Volume 2 ===
The original series ended with #544 and relaunched as a new volume after the events of the X-Men: Schism miniseries, wherein half the X-Men, led by Wolverine, returned to New York, to found a new school. The new volume featured the Extinction Team, containing members of the X-Men whom Cyclops had retained to deal with potential threats to the mutant race's survival. Gillen's run led into, and crossed over with, the Avengers vs. X-Men storyline and finished with issue #20 in October 2012. The volume ended with Cyclops, who had become increasingly hardline during Gillen's run, in prison for his actions during that storyline. Gillen wrote a five-part epilogue, AvX: Consequences.

=== 2013–2015: Volume 3 ===
As part of Marvel NOW!, a new volume of Uncanny X-Men was launched in February 2013 with an April 2013 cover date, written by Brian Michael Bendis, who is also writing another X-Men title, All-New X-Men, and drawn by Chris Bachalo. It features Cyclops and remnants of his Extinction Team recruiting new mutants to help them prepare for what Cyclops believes to be an inevitable revolution, coinciding events of the first All-New X-Men story arc. This volume saw Cyclops leading his team to an abandoned Weapon X facility to train new recruits and prepare for impending war against the humans, who see Cyclops as a terrorist due to his actions in Avengers Vs. X-Men. Eventually, Kitty Pryde and the time-displaced X-Men join his cause after facing a team of X-Men from a dystopian future. It lasted 36 issues, with the final issue reverting to the legacy numbering of Uncanny X-Men #600.

=== 2016–2017: Volume 4 ===
As part of All-New, All-Different Marvel, Uncanny X-Men was relaunched, written by Cullen Bunn with art by Greg Land. The relaunched Uncanny X-Men team features Magneto leading Psylocke, Archangel, M, Mystique, Fantomex and Sabretooth, while a different team led by Storm is called the Extraordinary X-Men. Cyclops's fate after Battleworld is shown in the Death of X miniseries, where Cyclops is exposed to the Terrigen Mist and dies from M-Pox.

The tagline for the relaunched series is "Bigger threats require more threatening X-Men", and is considered to be a continuation of Bunn's previous work on the Magneto solo series. The series will deal with threats that arise as a result of a new, more dangerous world post-Secret Wars. Summing up the team, Bunn states "They're upholding Xavier's dream, but they have no right to do so."

=== 2019: Volume 5 ===
Announced in August 2018, Uncanny X-Men (vol. 5) debuted November 14, 2018, with the weekly 10-part "X-Men: Disassembled" arc and follows on from the events of the Extermination miniseries. This incarnation of the team features Lucas Bishop, Kurt Wagner/Nightcrawler, Jean Grey, Ororo Munroe/Storm, Elizabeth "Betsy" Braddock/Psylocke, Jean-Paul Beaubier/Northstar, Robert "Bobby" Drake/Iceman, Hank McCoy/Beast, Laura Kinney/X-23, Lorna Dane/Polaris, Jubilation Lee/Jubilee, Kitty Pryde/Shadowcat and Sam Guthrie/Cannonball as well as trainee X-Men Hisako Ichiki/Armor, Victor Borkowski/Anole, Megan Gwynn/Pixie, Idie Okonkwo/Oya, Robert Herman/Glob, Santo Vaccarro/Rockslide. Following the 10th issue, the series began focusing on a new team of X-Men featuring Scott Summers/Cyclops, James "Logan" Howlett/Wolverine, Alex Summers/Havok, Jamie Madrox/Multiple Man, Rahne Sinclair/Wolfsbane, Illyana Rasputin/Magik, Danielle Moonstar/Mirage, and Xi'an Coy Minh/Karma.

After this volume, all X-Men titles were cancelled and two intertwining six-issue miniseries written by Jonathan Hickman, called "House of X" and "Powers of X", began a weekly run in July 2019 and concluded on October of the same year. Shortly after those were completed, the X-Men series relaunched with X-Men #1, accompanied by the other related teams' regular series, such as Marauders, X-Force, Excalibur, New Mutants, X-Corp, Wolverine, X-Men: Giant Size, and reviving 1987's Fallen Angels; all part of the 2019 story arc "Dawn of X", which searches to unite all mutantdom and settle down as a whole species.

=== 2024–present: Volume 6 ===
It was announced that a new Uncanny X-Men series would return. The first issue was released on August 7, 2024, cover-dated October 2024, and is written by Gail Simone and pencilled by David Marquez. The members of this team are Wolverine, Gambit, Jubilee, Rogue, and Nightcrawler. In the series, the team are sought out by a group of teenage mutants, known as the Outliers, for help because they are being pursued by the creature Hag. This team consists of Ransom, Jitter, Calico, and Deathdream, and the X-Men subsequently agree to take them in and train them.

== Contributors ==
=== Vol. 1 (1963–2011, 2016) ===
==== Writers ====
Years	Writer	Issues
1963–1966	Stan Lee	#1–19
1966–1968, 1969–1970	Roy Thomas	#20–43, #55–64, #66
1968	Gary Friedrich	#44–47
1968–1969	Arnold Drake	#47–54
1970	Dennis O'Neil	#65
1970–1975	Reprints of X-Men #12–45	#67–93
1975	Len Wein	Giant-Size X-Men #1; #94–95
1975–1991, 2000–2001, 2004–2006	Chris Claremont	#94–279, #381–389, #444–473
1978–1981, 1991–1992	John Byrne	#113–143, #281–285, #288
1988	Tom DeFalco	#228
1991	Fabian Nicieza	#279–280
1991–1992	Jim Lee	#281, #285–288
1991–1992	Whilce Portacio	#281–286, #288
1992–1997, 2001	Scott Lobdell	#286–350, #390–393; #-1
1997–1999	Steven T. Seagle	#350–365
1999–2000	Alan Davis	#366–380
2001–2002	Joe Casey	#394–409
2002–2004	Chuck Austen	#410–443
2006	Tony Bedard	#472–474
2006–2008	Ed Brubaker	#475–503
2008–2011	Matt Fraction	#500–534
2011	Kieron Gillen	#531–544; #534.1
2016	Brian Michael Bendis	#600

==== Pencilers ====
Years	Penciler	Issues
1963–1965	Jack Kirby	#1–11
1965	Alex Toth	#12
1965–1969	Werner Roth	#13–22 (as Jay Gavin), #23–29, #31–33, #35, #44–49, #52, #55; #38–43, #47–57 (back-up stories)
1967	Jack Sparling	#30
1967	Dan Adkins	#34
1967	Ross Andru	#36–37
1967–1970	Don Heck	#38–42, #48, #52, #54–55, #64
1968	George Tuska	#43; #44–46 (back-up stories)
1968	Jim Steranko	#50–51
1969, 1984–1987	Barry Windsor-Smith	#53 (as Barry Smith), #186, #198, #205, #214
1969–1970	Neal Adams	#56–63, #65
1970	Sal Buscema	#66
1970–1975	Reprints of X-Men #12–45	#67–93
1975–1977, 1981–1982	Dave Cockrum	Giant-Size X-Men #1; #94–105, #107, #145–150, #153–158, #161–164
1977	Bob Brown	#106
1977–1981	John Byrne	#108–109, #111–143
1978	Tony DeZuniga	#110
1981–1982	Brent Anderson	#144, #160
1981	Jim Sherman	#151
1981	Bob McLeod	#151–152
1982	Bill Sienkiewicz	#159
1983, 1991	Paul Smith	#165–170, #172–175, #278
1983	Walt Simonson	#171
1983–1986, 1992–1994	John Romita Jr.	#175–185, #187–197, #199–200, #202–203, #206–211, #287, #300–302, #304, #306–311
1986–1989	Rick Leonardi	#201, #212, #231, #235, #237, #252
1986	June Brigman	#204
1986–1987	Bret Blevins	#211, #219
1987, 2004–2005	Alan Davis	#213, #215, #444–447, #450–451, #455–459, #462–463
1987	Jackson Guice	#216–217
1987–1990	Marc Silvestri	#218, #220–222, #224–230, #232–234, #236, #238–244, #246–247, #249–251, #253–255, #259–261
1987	Kerry Gammill	#223
1989	Rob Liefeld	#245
1989–1991	Jim Lee	#248, #256–258, #267–277
1990	Kieron Dwyer	#262
1990	Bill Jaaska	#263, #265
1990	Mike Collins	#264, #266
1991–1992	Andy Kubert	#279–280, #288
1991	Steven Butler	#280
1991–1992, 2010	Whilce Portacio	#281–286, #289–290, #526–529
1992–1993, 1999–2001	Tom Raney	#291–293, #374, #377, #379–380, #382, #399
1992–1993	Brandon Peterson	#294–299
1993	Richard Bennett Lamas	#303
1993	Jan Duursema	#305
1994–1997	Joe Madureira	#312–313, #316–317, #325–326, #328–330, #332, #334–338, #340–343, #345–348, #350
1994	Lee Weeks	#314
1994–1995, 1999, 2006	Roger Cruz	#315, #318, #320, #324, #327, #376, #473–474
1994	Steve Epting	#319
1995, 2002–2003	Ron Garney	#321, #401–402, #409–412, #421–424, #435–436
1995	Tom Grummett	#322
1995–1997	Bryan Hitch	#323, #331; #-1
1996	Pascual Ferry	#333
1996, 2000–2001, 2004, 2007	Salvador Larroca	#338, #387–392, #437–443, #487–491
1996, 1999–2000	Adam Kubert	#339, #368–370, #372–373, #375, #378, #381
1996	Cedric Nocon	#339
1997	Melvin Rubi	#344–345
1997–1999, 2005–2006, 2016	Chris Bachalo	#349, #353–356, #358–360, #362–363, #365, #464–468, #472, #600
1997	Andy Smith	#350
1998	Ed Benes	#351
1998	Cully Hamner	#352
1998	Tommy Lee Edwards	#352
1998	Darryl Banks	#352
1998	J.H. Williams III	#352
1998	John Cassaday	#352
1998, 2008–2011	Terry Dodson	#352, #500, #504–507, #513–514, #523–525, #535–538
1998	Dan Norton	#357
1998	Dexter Vines	#357
1998	Scott Hanna	#357
1998	Ryan Benjamin	#359
1998	Steve Skroce	#361
1999	Leinil Francis Yu	#364, #366–367
1999	Jimmy Cheung	#371
2000	Graham Nolan	#378
2001	Ian Churchill	#394–396
2001	Mel Rubi	#397
2001–2003	Sean Phillips	#397–398, #400, #404–405, #407–409, #413–415
2001–2002	Ashley Wood	#398, #400
2003	Kia Asamiya	#416–420
2003	Philip Tan	#425–426, #429–433
2006–2008	Billy Tan	#469–471, #475–476, #478–479, #481–482, #484–486, #492–494
2006–2007	Clayton Henry	#477, #480, #483
2007	Mark Bagley	#488
2008	Michael Choi	#495–499
2008–2011	Greg Land	#500–503, #508–511, #515–521, #530–534, #540–544
2011	Carlos Pacheco	#534.1
2011	Ibraim Roberson	#539
2016	Sara Pichelli	#600
2016	Mahmud Asrar	#600
2016	Stuart Immonen	#600
2016	David Marquez	#600
2016	Kris Anka	#600
2016	Frazer Irving	#600

=== Vol. 2 (2012) ===
==== Writers ====
Years	Writer	Issues
2012	Kieron Gillen	#1–20

==== Pencilers ====
Years	Penciler	Issues
2012	Carlos Pacheco	#1–3, #9–10, #20
2012	Jorge Molina	#2
2012	Rodney Buchemi	#2–3
2012	Paco Diaz	#3, #10
2012	Brandon Peterson	#4
2012	Greg Land	#5–8, #11–12
2012	Billy Tan	#13
2012	Dustin Weaver	#14
2012	Daniel Acuña	#15–17
2012	Michael Del Mundo	#17
2012	Ron Garney	#18
2012	Dale Eaglesham	#19

=== Vol. 3 (2013–2015) ===
==== Writers ====
Years	Writer	Issues
2013–2015	Brian Michael Bendis	#1–35

==== Pencilers ====
Years	Penciler	Issues
2013–2015	Chris Bachalo	#1–4, #8–9, #12–14, #16–17, #19–22, #25, #27, #29–32
2013–2015	Frazer Irving	#5–7, #10–11
2013–2015	Kris Anka	#11, #15, #23–24, #26, #28, #33–34
2014	Marco Rudy	#18
2015	Valerio Schiti	#35

=== Vol. 4 (2016–2017) ===
==== Writers ====
Years	Writer	Issues
2016–2017	Cullen Bunn	#1–19

==== Pencilers ====
Years	Penciler	Issues
2016–2017	Greg Land	#1–5, #11–15
2016–2017	Ken Lashley	#6–10, #17
2017	Ibraim Roberson	#15
2017	Edgar Salazar	#16, #18–19

=== Vol. 5 (2019) ===
==== Writers ====
Years	Writer	Issues
2019	Ed Brisson	#1–10
2019	Kelly Thompson	#1–10
2019	Matthew Rosenberg	#1–22

==== Pencilers ====
Years	Penciler	Issues
2019	Mahmud Asrar	#1
2019	Mark Bagley	#1 (back-up stories)
2019	Mirko Colak	#1 (back-up stories)
2019	Ibraim Roberson	#1 (back-up stories)
2019	R.B. Silva	#2, #5, #8
2019	Yıldıray Çınar	#3, #6, #9
2019	Pere Pérez	#4, #7, #10
2019	Salvador Larroca	#11–16, #20–22
2019	Carlos Gomez	#17, #19
2019	Carlos Villa	#18–19
2019	Robert Quinn	#19
2019	David Messina	#22

=== Vol. 6 (2024-present) ===
==== Writers ====
Years	Writer	Issues
2024-present	Gail Simone	#1-present

==== Pencilers ====
Years	Penciler	Issues
2024-present	David Marquez	#1-present

=== Annuals ===
Like many comic book series, Uncanny X-Men had an associated double-sized Annual series, once in both 1970 and 1971, then regularly from 1979 to 2001. A second series of Uncanny X-Men Annuals began in 2006 as volume 2 issue #1.

==== Writers ====
Years	Writer	Issues
1970	Reprint of X-Men #9, #11	#1
1971	Reprint of X-Men #22–23	#2
1979–1990	Chris Claremont	#3–14 (#13, second story, under pseudonym "Sally Pashkow")
1988	Mark Gruenwald	#12 (third story)
1989	Terry Austin	#13
1989	Peter Sanderson	#13 (third story)
1991–1992	Fabian Nicieza	#15–16
1992	Chris Cooper	#16 (second story)
1993, 2001	Scott Lobdell	#17, Annual 2000
1994	Glenn Herdling	#18
1994	Jeph Loeb	#18 (second story)
1995–1996	Terry Kavanagh	Annual '95, Annual '96
1996	Howard Mackie	Annual '96
1997	Jorge Gonzalez	Annual '97
1998, 2002	Joe Casey	Annual '98, Annual 2001
2000	Ben Raab	Annual '99
2001	Fiona Avery	Annual 2000

==== Pencilers ====
Years	Penciler	Issues
1970	Reprint of X-Men #9, #11	#1
1971	Reprint of X-Men #22–23	#2
1979	George Pérez	#3
1980	John Romita Jr.	#4
1981	Brent Anderson	#5
1982	Bill Sienkiewicz	#6
1983	Michael Golden	#7
1983	Bret Blevins	#7
1984	Steve Leialoha	#8
1985–1986, 1988, 1990	Arthur Adams	#9–10, #12, #14
1987	Alan Davis	#11
1988	Ron Lim	#12 (third story)
1989	Mike Vosburg	#13
1989	Jim Fern	#13 (second story)
1989	Mark Bagley	#13 (third story)
1990	Mark Heike	#14 (second story)
1991	Tom Raney	#15
1991	Jerry DeCaire	#15 (second story)
1992	Jae Lee	#16
1993	Jason Pearson	#17
1993	Tom Grummett	#17 (second story)
1994	Ian Churchill	#18
1994	Tim Sale	#18 (second story)
1995	Bryan Hitch	Annual '95
1995	Bob McLeod	Annual '95
1996	Nick Gnazzo	Annual '96
1996	David Perrin	Annual '96
1997	Duncan Rouleau	Annual '97
1998	Paul Pelletier	Annual '98
1998	Leo Fernandez	Annual '98
2000	Anthony Williams	Annual '99
2001	Esad Ribić	Annual 2000
2002	Ashley Wood	Annual 2001

== Team roster ==
=== Volume 1 ===
Issues	Years	Team roster
#1–59	1963–1969	Warren Worthington III/Angel, Hank McCoy/Beast, Scott Summers/Cyclops, Robert "Bobby" Drake/Iceman, Jean Grey/Marvel Girl
#60–66	1969–1970	Warren Worthington III/Angel, Hank McCoy/Beast, Scott Summers/Cyclops, Alex Summers/Havok, Robert "Bobby" Drake/Iceman, Jean Grey/Marvel Girl, Lorna Dane/Polaris
#67–93	1970–1975	Warren Worthington III/Angel, Scott Summers/Cyclops, Robert "Bobby" Drake/Iceman, Jean Grey/Marvel Girl Note: Despite the series being in reprints during this time, the X-Men continued to appear as guest-stars in other Marvel titles. In Amazing Adventures #11 (March 1972), it was revealed in a flashback that Hank McCoy/Beast had left the group sometime before and accepted a position with the Brand Corporation. In another flashback recounted in Incredible Hulk #150 (April 1972), Alex Summers/Havok and Lorna Dane/Polaris also left the group soon after, due to a dispute between Havok and Iceman over Polaris, and moved to New Mexico. It is unknown whether they rejoined the team following the "Secret Empire" storyline in Captain America #172–175 (April–July 1974) and prior to being captured by Krakoa in Giant-Size X-Men #1 (May 1975).
#94–95	1975	Scott Summers/Cyclops, Ororo Munroe/Storm, Kurt Wagner/Nightcrawler, James "Logan" Howlett/Wolverine, Piotr "Peter" Rasputin/Colossus, Sean Cassidy/Banshee, Shiro Yoshida/Sunfire, John Proudstar/Thunderbird
#96–128	1975–1979	Scott Summers/Cyclops, Jean Grey (as Phoenix starting in #101), Ororo Munroe/Storm, Kurt Wagner/Nightcrawler, James "Logan" Howlett/Wolverine, Piotr "Peter" Rasputin/Colossus, Sean Cassidy/Banshee
#129–138	1980	Scott Summers/Cyclops, Jean Grey (as Phoenix starting in #101), Ororo Munroe/Storm, Kurt Wagner/Nightcrawler, James "Logan" Howlett/Wolverine, Piotr "Peter" Rasputin/Colossus
#139–148	1980–1981	Warren Worthington III/Angel, Ororo Munroe/Storm, Kurt Wagner/Nightcrawler, James "Logan" Howlett/Wolverine, Pitor "Peter" Rasputin/Colossus, Kitty Pryde/Sprite
#149–170	1981–1983	Scott Summers/Cyclops, Ororo Munroe/Storm, Kurt Wagner/Nightcrawler, James "Logan" Howlett/Wolverine, Piotr "Peter" Rasputin/Colossus, Kitty Pryde/Ariel
#171–183	1983–1984	Scott Summers/Cyclops, Ororo Munroe/Storm, Kurt Wagner/Nightcrawler, James "Logan" Howlett/Wolverine, Piotr "Peter" Rasputin/Colossus, Kitty Pryde/Ariel, Anna Marie LeBeau/Rogue
#184–200	1984–1985	Scott Summers/Cyclops, Ororo Munroe/Storm, Kurt Wagner/Nightcrawler, James "Logan" Howlett/Wolverine, Piotr "Peter" Rasputin/Colossus, Kitty Pryde/Ariel, Anna Marie LeBeau/Rogue, Rachel Summers Inactive; Scott Summers/Cyclops #184–198; Ororo Munroe/Storm #193–199; Kitty Pryde/Ariel and James "Logan" Howlett/Wolverine #183–191
#201–213	1986–1987	Ororo Munroe/Storm, Kurt Wagner/Nightcrawler, James "Logan" Howlett/Wolverine, Piotr "Peter" Rasputin/Colossus, Kitty Pryde/Shadowcat, Rachel Summers, Erik Magnus Lehnsherr/Magneto
#214–245	1987–1989	Alex Summers/Havok, Ororo Munroe/Storm, James "Logan" Howlett/Wolverine, Piotr "Peter" Rasputin/Colossus, Anna Marie LeBeau/Rogue, Elizabeth "Betsy" Braddock/Psylocke, Alison Blaire/Dazzler, Longshot Inactive; Piotr "Peter" Rasputin/Colossus #214–224; Kitty Pryde/Shadowcat and Kurt Wagner/Nightcrawler #214–227 (left); Note: Erik Magnus Lehnsherr/Magneto remained allied with the X-Men but was not featured much in the title and was officially left out in #226
#246–272	1989–1991	The X-Men are disassembled. The issues variously feature individual characters or small groups who have previously been X-Men or been affiliated with the X-Men.
#273–280	1991	Sean Cassidy/Banshee, Forge, Remy LeBeau/Gambit, Jubilation Lee/Jubilee, Elizabeth "Betsy" Braddock/Psylocke, Ororo Munroe/Storm, James "Logan" Howlett/Wolverine
#281–290	1991–1992	Ororo Munroe/Storm, Jean Grey, Warren Worthington III/Archangel, Robert "Bobby" Drake/Iceman, Piotr "Peter" Rasputin/Colossus, Forge, Lucas Bishop (Gold team)
#291–304	1992–1993	Ororo Munroe/Storm, Jean Grey, Warren Worthington III/Archangel, Robert "Bobby" Drake/Iceman, Piotr "Peter" Rasputin/Colossus, Lucas Bishop (Gold team) X-Cutioner's Song crossover (#294–296); Fatal Attractions crossover (#304)
#305–315	1993–1994	Ororo Munroe/Storm, Jean Grey, Warren Worthington III/Archangel, Robert "Bobby" Drake/Iceman, Lucas Bishop (Gold Team)
#316–317	1994	Phalanx Covenant crossover Generation X forms as Sean Cassidy/Banshee, Emma Frost/White Queen, Jubilation Lee/Jubilee, and Victor Creed/Sabretooth protect Clarice Ferguson/Blink, Monet St. Croix/M, Paige Guthrie/Husk, Everett Thomas/Synch, and Angelo Espinosa/Skin from the Phalanx.
#318–321	1994–1995	Scott Summers/Cyclops, Hank McCoy/Beast, Elizabeth "Betsy" Braddock/Psylocke, Anna Marie LeBeau/Rogue, Remy LeBeau/Gambit, Ororo Munroe/Storm, Jean Grey, Warren Worthington III/Archangel, Robert "Bobby" Drake/Iceman, Lucas Bishop (Blue and Gold Teams) Legion Quest crossover (#320–321)
	1995	Age of Apocalypse event The series was replaced with Astonishing X-Men for four months during the event. It featured Clarice Ferguson/Blink, Kevin Sidney/Morph, Anna Marie Lehnsherr/Rogue, Victor Creed/Sabretooth, Shiro Yoshida/Sunfire, and Kyle Gibney/Wild Child.
#322–334	1995–1996	Scott Summers/Cyclops, Hank McCoy/Beast, James "Logan" Howlett/Wolverine, Elizabeth "Betsy" Braddock/Psylocke, Remy LeBeau/Gambit, Ororo Munroe/Storm, Jean Grey, Warren Worthington III/Archangel, Robert "Bobby" Drake/Iceman, Lucas Bishop, Sam Guthrie/Cannonball Note Uncanny X-Men and X-Men (vol. 2) became tightly linked Hank McCoy/Dark Beast, Beast's alternate universe counterpart from the Age of Apocalypse storyline, replaced the Beast in X-Men Unlimited #10 and started impersonating him in Uncanny X-Men #331 and X-Men (vol. 2) #50
#335–336	1996	Onslaught event Scott Summers/Cyclops, Hank McCoy/Beast, James "Logan" Howlett/Wolverine, Elizabeth "Betsy" Braddock/Psylocke, Anna Marie LeBeau/Rogue, Remy LeBeau/Gambit, Ororo Munroe/Storm, Jean Grey, Warren Worthington III/Archangel, Robert "Bobby" Drake/Iceman, Lucas Bishop, Sam Guthrie/Cannonball, Joseph
#337–342	1996–1997	Warren Worthington III/Archangel, Hank McCoy/Beast, Lucas Bishop, Sam Guthrie/Cannonball, Scott Summers/Cyclops, Remy LeBeau/Gambit, Joseph, Jean Grey, Elizabeth "Betsy" Braddock/Psylocke, Anna Marie LeBeau/Rogue, Ororo Munroe/Storm, James "Logan" Howlett/Wolverine
#343–349	1997	Hank McCoy/Beast, Lucas Bishop, Remy LeBeau/Gambit, Joseph, Anna Marie LeBeau/Rogue
#350–360	1997–1998	Hank McCoy/Beast, Lucas Bishop, Sam Guthrie/Cannonball, Cecilia Reyes, Scott Summers/Cyclops, Robert "Bobby" Drake/Iceman, Jean Grey, Joseph, Japeth/Maggott, Sarah/Marrow, Anna Marie LeBeau/Rogue, Ororo Munroe/Storm, James "Logan" Howlett/Wolverine
#361–372	1998–1999	Piotr "Piotr" Rasputin/Colossus, Remy LeBeau/Gambit, Kitty Pryde, Sarah/Marrow, Kurt Wagner/Nightcrawler, Anna Marie LeBeau/Rogue, Ororo Munroe/Storm, James "Logan" Howlett/Wolverine
#373–374	1999	Piotr "Peter" Rasputin/Colossus, Sarah/Marrow
#375–378	1999–2000	The Shattering / The Twelve / Age of Apocalypse crossover After Charles Xavier/Professor X briefly disbands the team to expose the Skrull infiltrator, the team learns of the Twelve. As Apocalypse's plans come to fruition, many X-Men, as well as the members of the Twelve, come together to battle him, even as he warps reality.
#379–380	2000	All mutants worldwide are rendered powerless by the High Evolutionary and Mr. Sinister, leading to an interim team battling them after the X-Men briefly disband.
#381–390	2000–2001	Hank McCoy/Beast, Nathan Summers/Cable, Remy LeBeau/Gambit, Jean Grey, Anna Marie LeBeau/Rogue, Ororo Munroe/Storm
#391	2001	Scott Summers/Cyclops solo issue
#392–393	2001	"Eve of Destruction" crossover: While Scott Summers/Cyclops and James "Logan" Howlett/Wolverine infiltrate Genosha to save Charles Xavier/Professor X, Jean Grey forms an interim team consisting of Dazzler, Jean-Paul Beaubier/Northstar, Paulie Provenzano/Omerta, Levi Yoshida/Sunpyre, Hector Rendoza/Wraith, and a mind-controlled Joanna Cargill/Frenzy.
#394	2001	Warren Worthington III/Archangel, Scott Summers/Cyclops, Jean Grey, James "Logan" Howlett/Wolverine
#395–398	2001	Warren Worthington III/Archangel, Jonothan "Jono" Starsmore/Chamber, Robert "Bobby" Drake/Iceman, Kurt Wagner/Nightcrawler, James "Logan" Howlett/Wolverine
#399–414	2001–2002	Warren Worthington III/Archangel, Jonothan "Jono" Starsmore/Chamber, Robert "Bobby" Drake/Iceman, Kurt Wagner/Nightcrawler, Miranda Leevald/Stacy X, James "Logan" Howlett/Wolverine
#415–443	2002–2004	Warren Worthington III/Archangel, Alex Summers/Havok, Paige Guthrie/Husk, Robert "Bobby" Drake/Iceman, Jubilation Lee/Jubilee, Cain Marko/Juggernaut, Kurt Wagner/Nightcrawler, Jean-Paul Beaubier/Northstar, Lorna Dane/Polaris, Charles Xavier/Professor X, James "Logan" Howlett/Wolverine
#444–454	2004–2005	Lucas Bishop, Sam Guthrie/Cannonball, Kurt Wagner/Nightcrawler, Rachel Summers, Tessa/Sage, Ororo Munroe/Storm, James "Logan" Howlett/Wolverine
#455–474	2005–2006	Lucas Bishop, Sam Guthrie/Cannonball, Kurt Wagner/Nightcrawler, Elizabeth "Betsy" Braddock/Psylocke, Rachel Summers, Ororo Munroe/Storm, James "Logan" Howlett/Wolverine
#475–486	2006–2007	Darwin, Alex Summers/Havok, Kurt Wagner/Nightcrawler, Lorna Dane/Polaris, Charles Xavier/Professor X, Rachel Summers, James Proudstar/Warpath
#487–491	2007	Caliban, Hepzibah, Kurt Wagner/Nightcrawler, Charles Xavier/Professor X, Ororo Munroe/Storm, James Proudstar/Warpath
#492–494	2008	Messiah Complex crossover The whole team comes together under Cyclops to protect Hope Summers. Also featuring the debut of the new X-Force team, consisting of Caliban, Hepzibah, James Proudstar/Warpath, Rahne Sinclair/Wolfsbane, James "Logan" Howlett/Wolverine, and Laura Kinney/X-23.
#495–499	2008	Although divided, the team gradually starts to reform in San Francisco, California.
#500–507	2008–2009	Warren Worthington III/Angel, Hank McCoy/Beast, Sam Guthrie/Cannonball, Piotr "Peter" Rasputin/Colossus, Scott Summers/Cyclops, Alison Blaire/Dazzler, Emma Frost, Xi'an Coy Minh/Karma, Kurt Wagner/Nightcrawler, Megan Gwynn/Pixie, the Stepford Cuckoos, Ororo Munroe/Storm, James "Logan" Howlett/Wolverine
#508–512	2009	Warren Worthington III/Angel, Hank McCoy/Beast, Piotr "Peter" Rasoutin/Colossus, Scott Summers/Cyclops, Alison Blaire/Dazzler, James Bradley/Doctor Nemesis, Emma Frost, Robert "Bobby" Drake/Iceman, Xi'an Coy Minh/Karma, Kavita Rao, Madison Jeffries, Kurt Wagner/Nightcrawler, Jean-Paul Beaubier/Northstar, Megan Gwynn/Pixie, Elizabeth "Betsy" Braddock/Psylocke, the Stepford Cuckoos, Ororo Munroe/Storm, Yuriko Takiguchi, James "Logan" Howlett/Wolverine
#513–514	2009	Dark Avengers / Utopia crossover All the mutants in San Francisco battle against Norman Osborn's Dark Avengers and the group of Dark X-Men he forms under the Emma Frost/Black Queen, including Tyrone Johnson and Tandy Bowen/Cloak and Dagger, Daken (posing as Wolverine), Hank McCoy/Dark Beast, Calvin Rankin/Mimic, Raven Darkholme/Mystique (posing as Professor X), Namor MacKenzie/Namor the Sub-Mariner, and Michael Pointer/Weapon Omega.
#515–522	2009–2010	Warren Worthington III/Angel, Tabitha Smith-Boom Boom, Piotr "Peter" Rasputin/Colossus, Scott Summers/Cyclops, Alison Blaire/Dazzler, James Bradley/Doctor Nemesis, Emma Frost, Charlie Cluster-7/Fantomex, Robert "Bobby" Drake/Iceman, Kavita Rao, Madison Jeffries, Erik Magnus Lehnsherr/Magneto, Namor MacKenzie/Namor the Sub-Mariner, Kurt Wagner/Nightcrawler, Jean-Paul Beaubier/Northstar, Megan Gwynn/Pixie, Charles Xavier/Professor X, Elizabeth "Betsy" Braddock/Psylocke, Ann Marie LeBeau/Rogue, the Stepford Cuckoos, Ororo Munroe/Storm, James "Logan" Howlett/Wolverine
#523–525	2010	Second Coming crossover
#526–529	2010	Warren Worthington III/Angel, Cecilia Reyes, Piotr "Peter" Rasputin/Colossus, Scott Summers/Cyclops, Alison Blaire/Dazzler, James Bradley/Doctor Nemesis, Emma Frost, Charlie Cluster-7/Fantomez, Hope Summers, Robert "Bobby" Drake/Iceman, Kavita Rao, Kitty Pryde/Shadowcat, Madison Jeffries, Name MacKenzie/Namor the Sub-Mariner, Jean-Paul Beaubier/Northstar, Elizabeth "Betsy" Braddock/Psylocke, Anna Marie LeBeau/Rogue, Ororo Munroe/Storm, James "Logan" Howlett/Wolverine
#530–534	2010–2011	Warren Worthington III/Angel, Cecilia Reyes, Piotr "Peter" Rasputin/Colossus, Scott Summers/Cyclops, Alison Blaire/Dazzler, James Bradley/Doctor Nemesis, Emma Frost, Charlie Cluster-7/Fantomex, Hope Summers, Robert "Bobby" Drake/Iceman, Kavita Rao, Kitty Pryde/Shadowcat, Madison Jeffries, Erik Magnus Lehnsherr/Magneto, Namor Mackenzie/Namor the Sub-Mariner, Jean-Paul Beaubier/Northstar, Megan Gwynn/Pixie, Elizabeth "Betsy" Braddock/Psylocke, Anna Marie LeBeau/Rogue, Ororo Munroe/Storm, James "Logan" Howlett/Wolverine
#534.1–544	2011	Warren Worthington III/Angel, Piotr "Peter" Rasputin/Colossus, Scott Summers/Cyclops, Alison Blaire/Dazzler, James Bradley/Doctor Nemesis, Emma Frost, Hope Summers, Robert "Bobby" Drake/Iceman, Kavita Rao, Kitty Pryde/Shadowcat, Madison Jeffries, Erik Magnus Lehnsherr/Magneto, Namor Mackenzie/Namor the Sub-Mariner, Jean-Paul Beaubier/Northstar, Megan Gwynn/Pixie, Elizabeth "Betsy" Braddock/Psylocke, Anna Marie LeBeau/Rogue, Ororo Munroe/Storm, James "Logan" Howlett/Wolverine

=== Volume 2 ===
Issues	Years	Team roster
#1–20	2011–2012	Piotr "Peter" Rasputin/Colossus, Scott Summers/Cyclops, Danger, Emma Frost, Hope Summers, Illyana Rasputin/Magik, Erik Magnus Lehnsherr/Magneto, Namor Mackenzie/Namor the Sub-Mariner, Elizabeth "Betsy" Braddock/Psylocke, Ororo Munroe/Storm

=== Volume 3 ===
Issues	Years	Team roster
#1–11	2012–2013	Scott Summers/Cyclops, Emma Frost, Illyana Rasputin/Magik, Erik Magnus Lehnsherr/Magneto, Eva Bell/Tempus, Christopher Muse/Triage, Fabio Medina/Goldballs, David Bond/Hijack, Benjamin Deeds, the Stepford Cuckoos, Warren Worthington III/Angel (past)
#12–13	2013	Battle of the Atom crossover The X-Men of the Jean Grey School, Scott Summers/Cyclops' X-Men team, the time-displaced original X-Men from the past, and the X-Men from the future fight the Brotherhood of Mutants from the future.
#14–30	2013–2015	Scott Summers/Cyclops, Emma Frost, Illyana Rasputin/Magik, Kitty Pryde/Shadowcat, Lockheed, Alison Blaire/Dazzler, Alex Summers/Havok, Eva Bell/Tempus, Christopher Muse/Triage, Fabio Medina/Goldballs, Benjamin Deeds, David Bond/Hijack, the Stepford Cuckoos, Jean Grey (past), Hank McCoy/Beast (past), Robert "Bobby" Drake/Iceman (past), Warren Worthington III/Angel (past), Laura Kinney/X-23
#31	2015	Scott Summers/Cyclops, Emma Frost, Illyana Rasputin/Magik, Kitty Pryde/Shadowcat, Lockheed, Alison Blaire/Dazzler, Alex Summers/Havok, Christopher Muse/Triage, Fabio Medina/Goldballs, Benjamin Deeds, David Bond/Hijack, the Stepford Cuckoos, Jean Grey (past), Hank McCoy/Beast (past), Robert "Bobby" Drake/Iceman (past), Warren Worthington III/Angel (past), Laura Kinney/X-23
#32–35, #600	2015	Scott Summers/Cyclops, Emma Frost, Illyana Rasputin/Magik, Kitty Pryde/Shadowcat, Lockheed, Alison Blaire/Dazzler, Alex Summers/Havok, Scott Summers/Cyclops (past), Jean Grey (past), Hank McCoy/Beast (past), Robert "Bobby" Drake/Iceman (past), Warren Worthington/Angel (past), Laura Kinney/X-23

=== Volume 4 ===
Issues	Years	Team roster
#1–19	2015–2017	Warren Worthington III/Archangel, Monet St. Croix/M, Erik Magnus Lehnsherr/Magneto, Elizabeth "Betsy" Braddock/Psylocke, Victor Creed/Sabretooth, Raven Darkholme/Mystique, Charlie Cluster-7/Fantomex

=== Volume 5 ===
Issues	Years	Team roster
#1–10	2018–2019	Warren Worhington III/Archangel, Hank McCoy/Beast, Lucas Bishop, Sam Guthrie/Cannonball, Robert "Bobby" Drake/Iceman, Jean Grey, Jubilation Lee/Jubilee, Kurt Wagner/Nightcrawler, Jean-Paul Beaubier/Northstar, Lorna Dane/Polaris, Elizabeth "Betsy" Braddock/Psylocke, Kitty Pryde/Shadowcat, Ororo Munroe/Storm, Laura Kinney/X-23 Students: Vic Borkowski/Anole, Hisao Ichiki/Armor, Robert Herman/Glob Herman, Idie Okonkwo/Oya, Megan Gwynn/Pixie, Santo Vaccarro/Rockslide
#11	2019	Scott Summers/Cyclops, James "Logan" Howlett/Wolverine
#12–14	2019	Scott Summers/Cyclops, James "Logan" Howlett/Wolverine, Alex Summers/Havok, Jamie Madrox/Multiple Man, Rahne Sinclair/Wolfsbane, Illyana Rasputin/Magik, Danielle Moonstar/Mirage, Xi'an Coy Manh/Karma
#15	2019	Scott Summers/Cyclops, James "Logan" Howlett/Wolverine, Alex Summers/Havok, Jamie Madrox/Multiple Man, Rahne Sinclair/Wolfsbane, Illyana Rasputin/Magik, Danielle Moonstar/Mirage, Xi'an Coy Manh/Karma, Jonothan "Jono" Starsmore/Chamber
#16–18	2019	Scott Summers/Cyclops, James "Logan" Howlett/Wolverine, Alex Summers/Havok, Jamie Madrox/Multiple Man, Illyana Rasputin/Magik, Xi'an Coy Manh/Karma, Jonothan "Jono" Starsmore/Chamber, Sean Cassidy/Banshee, Hope Summers, Cain Marko/Juggernaut
#19–22	2019	Scott Summers/Cyclops, James "Logan" Howlett/Wolverine, Alex Summers/Havok, Jamie Madrox/Multiple Man, Illyana Rasputin/Magik, Danielle Moonstar/Mirage, Sean Cassidy/Banshee, Hope Summers, Cain Marko/Juggernaut

=== Volume 6 ===
Issues	Years	Team roster
#1–	2024-present	Anna Marie LeBeau/Rogue, Remy LeBeau/Gambit, James "Logan" Howlett/Wolverine, Jubilation Lee/Jubilee, Kurt Wagner/Nightcrawler Outliers: Valentin Correa/Ransom, Becca Simon-Pinette/Calico, Hotoru/Deathdream, Sofia Young/Jitter

=== Timeline ===
Notes

This is an article about the comic book, and thus the publication history, not the in-continuity history. As such, the above reflects the team roster for the book at time of publication. Similarly, this article only reflects the team roster for the X-Men team whose home is this publication.

Professor X is the Headmaster of Xavier's School for Gifted Youngsters and mentor to the X-Men, but he is rarely (if ever) a member of the X-Men team. In his role as mentor, he has typically been present in the book, but he has notable absences, including issues #43–64 (dead, later retconned as preparing for the Z'Nox), #200–273 (with Lilandra Neramani in Shi'ar space; replaced as Headmaster by Magneto during most of this absence), #340–351 (in government custody after the Onslaught crisis), #379–386 (educating Cadre K in space), and #495–513 (rebuilding his mind in X-Men: Legacy).

Jean Grey was replaced by the Phoenix Force from issues #101–137. This was a retcon that was only revealed years later.

At many times, the team roster has been the same as that appearing in X-Men (vol. 2) and during two periods, the two books have even been treated by their writer as a single bi-weekly title (issues #289–350 by Scott Lobdell and issues #366–380 by Alan Davis).

During issues #370–372, Wolverine was replaced by a Skrull infiltrator, leading to "The Shattering"/"The Twelve" storylines, and the Astonishing X-Men (vol. 2) limited series.

After moving to San Francisco, many other mutants continually appear as background characters or allies, but apart from during crossovers they are rarely considered part of the team roster.

After the series was relaunched as Uncanny X-Men #1, it featured Cyclops's "Extinction Team", composed of himself, Emma Frost, Namor, Magneto, Storm, Hope Summers, Colossus, Danger and Magik; Psylocke was briefly a member of this team while Emma was injured.

The sixth volume, beginning with Uncanny X-Men #1 (released August 7, 2024) also features the Outliers, consisting of Ransom, Calico, Jitter, and Deathdream, alongside the main X-Men team.

== Title ==
Issues	Title	Indicia title
#1–49	The X-Men	The X-Men
#50–93	X-Men	The X-Men
#94–113	X-Men	X-Men
#114–138	The Uncanny X-Men	X-Men
#139–141	The Uncanny X-Men	The X-Men
#142–393	The Uncanny X-Men	The Uncanny X-Men
#394–407	Uncanny X-Men	The Uncanny X-Men
#408–544, #600; Vol. 2 #1–20; Vol. 3 #1–35; Vol. 4 #1–19; Vol. 5 #1–22	Uncanny X-Men	Uncanny X-Men

Until 2011, Uncanny X-Men remained Marvel Comics' only Silver Age title to retain its consecutive issue numbering since its conception, even during the early 1970s reprint hiatus. The Amazing Spider-Man, The Avengers, The Fantastic Four and other legacy titles have all, at one time or another, restarted their numbering at #1, though all later returned to their original numbering. The final issue to be published under the original numbering was #544, published in October 2011 with a December 2011 cover date, which was followed by a new #1 the following month. In 2015, Marvel released Uncanny X-Men #600, following Vol. 3 #35, as a conclusion to the Brian Michael Bendis' run on both All New X-Men and Vol. 3.

From issue #1-93 the indicia title was The X-Men. After the relaunch with issue #94, and up to #138, the article The was dropped from the indicia title, making it X-Men, but the article was added back in issues #139–141.

The title The Uncanny X-Men was first used in the issue #95 title block following the "Stan Lee Presents:" tagline, though the title did not appear on the covers or indicia titles yet; covers begin displaying this title in #114. Beginning with issue #142 and up to #407, the indicia title was finally changed to The Uncanny X-Men. Issue #408 was the first to use the indicia title Uncanny X-Men.

A separate series, titled simply X-Men, launched with an October 1991 cover date.

== Collected editions ==
=== Trade paperbacks ===
==== Marvel Masterworks ====
Title	Volume	Material collected	Publication date	ISBN
Marvel Masterworks: The X-Men	1	The X-Men #1–10	April 2009	978-0785136989
Marvel Masterworks: The X-Men	2	The X-Men #11–21	August 2009	978-0785137009
Marvel Masterworks: The X-Men	3	The X-Men #22–31	August 2011	978-0785150701
Marvel Masterworks: The X-Men	4	The X-Men #32–42	December 2011	978-0785150725
Marvel Masterworks: The X-Men	5	The X-Men #43–53, The Avengers #53, Ka-Zar #2–3, Marvel Tales #30	January 2013	978-0785117872
Marvel Masterworks: The X-Men	6	The X-Men #54–66	February 2014	978-0785188377
Marvel Masterworks: The Uncanny X-Men	1	Giant-Size X-Men #1; Uncanny X-Men #94–100	December 2009	978-0785137023
Marvel Masterworks: The Uncanny X-Men	2	Uncanny X-Men #101–110	January 2010	978-0785137047
Marvel Masterworks: The Uncanny X-Men	3	Uncanny X-Men #111–121	January 2011	978-0785145707
Marvel Masterworks: The Uncanny X-Men	4	Uncanny X-Men #122–131, Uncanny X-Men Annual #3	February 2012	978-0785158691
Marvel Masterworks: The Uncanny X-Men	5	Uncanny X-Men #132–140, Uncanny X-Men Annual #4, Phoenix: The Untold Story (one-shot), material from Bizarre Adventures #27	July 2012	978-0785158721
Marvel Masterworks: The Uncanny X-Men	6	Uncanny X-Men #141-150	February 13, 2008	978-0785130147
Marvel Masterworks: The Uncanny X-Men	7	Uncanny X-Men #151-159, Uncanny X-Men Annual #5, Avengers Annual #10	January 12, 2011	978-0785135142
Marvel Masterworks: The Uncanny X-Men	8	Uncanny X-Men #160-167, Uncanny X-Men Annual #6, X-Men Special Edition #1, Marvel Treasury Edition #26-27	February 22, 2012	978-0785158707
Marvel Masterworks: The Uncanny X-Men	9	Uncanny X-Men #168-175, Uncanny X-Men Annual #7, Marvel Graphic Novel No. 5 - X-Men: God Loves, Man Kills, Wolverine (vol. 1) #1-4	February 10, 2015	978-0785191544
Marvel Masterworks: The Uncanny X-Men	10	Uncanny X-Men #176-188, Magik #1-4, material from Marvel Fanfare #40	February 21, 2017	978-1302903602
Marvel Masterworks: The Uncanny X-Men	11	Uncanny X-Men #189-193, Uncanny X-Men Annual #8, X-Men/Alpha Flight #1-2, Kitty Pryde and Wolverine #1-6	January 29, 2019	978-1302915186
Marvel Masterworks: The Uncanny X-Men	12	Uncanny X-Men #194-200, Uncanny X-Men Annual #9, New Mutants Special Edition #1, Nightcrawler #1-4, material from Bizarre Adventures #27	March 3, 2020	978-1302922382
Marvel Masterworks: The Uncanny X-Men	13	Uncanny X-Men #201-209, Longshot #1-6, material from Marvel Fanfare #33	June 23, 2021	978-1302929459
Marvel Masterworks: The Uncanny X-Men	14	Uncanny X-Men #210-219, Uncanny X-Men Annual #10, New Mutants Annual #2, Fantastic Four vs X-Men #1-4	March 16, 2022	978-1302933449
Marvel Masterworks: The Uncanny X-Men	15	Uncanny X-Men #220-231, Uncanny X-Men Annual #11, X-Men vs. the Avengers #1-4, material from Best of Marvel Comics	March 15, 2023	978-1302949228
Marvel Masterworks: The Uncanny X-Men	16	Uncanny X-Men #232-243, Uncanny X-Men Annual #12, X-Factor #37-39	March 26, 2024	978-1302955151
Marvel Masterworks: The Uncanny X-Men	17	Uncanny X-Men #244-255, Uncanny X-Men Annual #13, material from Classic X-Men #39 and What The--?! #1-5	September 16, 2025	978-1302962494

==== Essentials ====
Title	Volume	Material collected	Publication date	ISBN
Essential Classic X-Men	1	X-Men #1–24	June 1999	978-1904159636
Essential Classic X-Men	2	X-Men #25–53; Avengers #53	May 2006	978-0785121169
Essential Classic X-Men	3	X-Men #54–66, 67–93 (covers only); Amazing Adventures (vol. 2) #11–17; Marvel Team-Up #4; Incredible Hulk (vol. 2) #150, #161	February 2009	978-0785130604
Essential X-Men	1	X-Men #94–119; Giant-Size X-Men #1	May 2008	978-0785132554
Essential X-Men	2	X-Men #120–141; Uncanny X-Men #142–144, Uncanny X-Men Annual #3–4	December 2005	978-0785120070
Essential X-Men	3	Uncanny X-Men #145–161, Uncanny X-Men Annual #5	August 2001	978-0785106616
Essential X-Men	4	Uncanny X-Men #162–179, Uncanny X-Men Annual #6; Marvel Graphic Novel No. 5 - X-Men: God Loves, Man Kills	May 2006	978-0785122951
Essential X-Men	5	Uncanny X-Men #180–198, Uncanny X-Men Annual #7–8	April 2007	978-0785126928
Essential X-Men	6	Uncanny X-Men #199–213; New Mutants Special Edition #1; Uncanny X-Men Annual #9; X-Factor #9–10; New Mutants #46; Thor #373–374; Power Pack #27	September 2005	978-0785117278
Essential X-Men	7	Uncanny X-Men #214–228, Uncanny X-Men Annual #10–11; Fantastic Four vs. the X-Men #1–4	April 2006	978-0785120551
Essential X-Men	8	Uncanny X-Men #229–245, Uncanny X-Men Annual #12–13; X-Factor #36–39	December 2007	978-0785127635
Essential X-Men	9	Uncanny X-Men #246–264, Uncanny X-Men Annual #13	June 2009	978-0785130796
Essential X-Men	10	Uncanny X-Men #265–272, Uncanny X-Men Annual #14; Fantastic Four Annual #23; New Mutants #95–97; X-Factor #60-62; material from X-Factor Annual #5 and New Mutants Annual #6	March 2012	978-0785163244
Essential X-Men	11	Uncanny X-Men #273–280, Uncanny X-Men Annual #15; X-Factor #69–70; X-Men Vol. 2 #1–3; material from X-Factor Annual #6 and New Mutants Annual #7	December 2012	978-0785166849

==== Panini Pocket Books ====
Title	Material collected	Publication date	ISBN
Second Genesis	Giant-Size X-Men #1; Uncanny X-Men #94-103	July 2004	978-1904419402
Magneto Triumphant	Uncanny X-Men #104-117	April 2005	978-1904419648
Wanted, Wolverine! Dead or Alive	Uncanny X-Men #118-124, Annual #3	September 2005	978-1904419808
Dark Phoenix	Uncanny X-Men #125-137	April 2006	978-1904419921
Days of Future Past	Uncanny X-Men #138-143, Annual #4	April 2006	978-1904419938
Rogue Storm	Uncanny X-Men #144-150	October 2006	978-1905239535
God Loves, Man Kills	Uncanny X-Men #151-153, Annual #5	September 2007	978-1846530470
Night Screams	Uncanny X-Men #154-161	October 2008	978-1846530715
Beyond the Farthest Star	Uncanny X-Men #162-167	March 2009	978-1846530814
Scarlet In Glory	Uncanny X-Men #169-175	September 2009	978-1846530975
Blood Feud	Uncanny X-Men #176-179, Annual #6 and New Mutants #13-14	March 2010	978-1846531125
Love and Madness	Uncanny X-Men #180-184 and New Mutants #15-17	September 2010	978-1846531279
Legacy of the Lost	Uncanny X-Men #185-191	March 2011	978-1846531385
The Gift	Uncanny X-Men #192-194 and X-Men/Alpha Flight #1-2	September 2013	978-1846531842
The Trial of Magneto	Uncanny X-Men #195-200	September 2014	978-1846532047
The Asgardian War	Uncanny X-Men #201-203, Annual #9 and New Mutants Special Edition #1	April 2015	978-1846532085

==== Epic Collection ====
Vol	Title	Material collected	Publication date (2nd or 3rd publishing)	ISBN
1	Children of the Atom	X-Men #1–23	December 24, 2014 (2019) (2024)	978-0785189046
2	Lonely Are the Hunted	X-Men #24–45; Avengers #53	December 7, 2016 (2026)	978-0785195832
3	The Sentinels Live	X-Men #46-66; material from Ka-Zar #2-3 and Marvel Tales #30	November 14, 2018 (2021)	978-1302912758
4	It's Always Darkest Before the Dawn	X-Men #67-93, Annual #1-2 (Reprint covers); Amazing Adventures (vol. 2) #11–17; Amazing Spider-Man #92; Incredible Hulk (vol. 2) #150, 161, 172, 180–182; Marvel Team-Up #4, 23; Avengers #110-111; Captain America #172-175; Defenders #15-16; Giant-Size Fantastic Four #4	July 17, 2019 (2023)	978-1302916039
5	Second Genesis	Giant-Size X-Men #1; Uncanny X-Men #94-110; Iron Fist #14-15; Marvel Team-Up #53, #69-70, Annual #1	March 29, 2017 (2023)	978-1302903909
6	Proteus	Uncanny X-Men #111–128, Annual #3; Marvel Team-Up #89; Incredible Hulk Annual #7	August 26, 2020 (2023)	978-1302922528
7	The Fate of the Phoenix	Uncanny X-Men #129-143, Annual #4; Marvel Treasury Edition #26-27; Phoenix: The Untold Story (1984); material from Marvel Team-Up (1972) #100	March 16, 2021 (2023)	978-1302922535
8	I, Magneto	Uncanny X-Men #144-153, Annual #5; Avengers Annual #10; Bizarre Adventures #27; material from Marvel Fanfare #1-4	November 30, 2021	978-1302929527
9	The Brood Saga	Uncanny X-Men #154-167, Annual #6; Special Edition X-Men #1	December 26, 2023	978-1302948818
10	God Loves, Man Kills	Uncanny X-Men #168-175, Annual #7; Marvel Graphic Novel #5 - X-Men: God Loves, Man Kills; Wolverine #1-4; and material from Official Handbook of the Marvel Universe	December 17, 2024	978-1302955595
11	Lifedeath	Uncanny X-Men #176-188; Kitty Pryde and Wolverine #1-6; and material from Marvel Fanfare #40	January 13, 2026	978-1302960643
12	The Gift	Uncanny X-Men #189-198, Annual #8; X-Men/Alpha Flight #1-2; Nightcrawler #1-4	December 23, 2015 (2024)	978-0785192176
13	Wounded Wolf	Uncanny X-Men #199-210, Annual #9-10; New Mutants Special Edition #1; and material from Marvel Fanfare #33	October 14, 2025	978-1302966010
14	Mutant Massacre	Uncanny X-Men #211-219, Fantastic Four vs. The X-Men #1-4; The X-Men vs. The Avengers #1-4; Spider-Man vs. Wolverine #1	June 30, 2026	978-1302966010
17	Dissolution & Rebirth	Uncanny X-Men #248-267	August 14, 2019 (2021)	978-1302918477
19	Mutant Genesis	Uncanny X-Men #278-280, Annual #15; X-Factor #65-70; X-Men (vol. 2) #1-3; material from X-Factor Annual #6 and New Mutants Annual #7	November 29, 2017 (2021)	978-1302903916
20	Bishop's Crossing	Uncanny X-Men #281-288, Annual #16, X-Men (vol. 2) #4-9, X-Men Annual #1, Ghost Rider #26-27	March 22, 2022 (2026)	978-1302934521
21	X-Cutioner's Song	Uncanny X-Men #289-296, X-Men (vol. 2) #10-16, X-Factor #84-86, X-Force #16-18	December 13, 2022	978-1302948283
22	Legacies	Uncanny X-Men #297-300, Uncanny X-Men Annual #17, X-Men (vol. 2) #17-23, Stryfe's Strike File, and X-Men Unlimited #1	April 11, 2023	978-1302951115
23	Fatal Attractions	Uncanny X-Men #301-306, X-Men (vol. 2) #24-25, X-Men Unlimited #2, Wolverine #75, Gambit #1-4, X-Men: Survival Guide to the Mansion	April 23, 2024	978-1302956851

==== X-Men Milestones ====
Title	Material collected	Publication date	ISBN
Dark Phoenix Saga	X-Men (1963) #129-137	July 9, 2019	978-1302918521
Mutant Massacre	Uncanny X-Men (1981) #210-214, X-Factor (1986) #9-11, New Mutants (1983) #46, Thor (1966) #373-374, Power Pack (1984) #27, Daredevil (1964) #238	August 13, 2019	978-1302918538
Fall of the Mutants	Uncanny X-Men (1981) #225-227, New Mutants (1983) #59-61, X-Factor (1986) #24-26	July 30, 2019	978-1302918514
Inferno	X-Terminators #1-4, Uncanny X-Men (1981) #239-243, X-Factor (1986) #35-39, New Mutants (1983) #71-73	September 10, 2019	978-1302919702
X-Tinction Agenda	Uncanny X-Men (1981) #235-238, #270-272; New Mutants (1983) #95-97; X-Factor (1986) #60-62	October 8, 2019	978-1302919689
X-Cutioner's Song	Uncanny X-Men (1981) #294-297, X-Factor (1986) #84-86, X-Men (1991) #14-16, X-Force (1991) #16-18, Stryfe's Strike File #1	November 5, 2019	978-1302919733
Fatal Attractions	Uncanny X-Men (1981) #298-300, #303-304, 315; X-Factor (1986) #92; X-Force (1991) #25; X-Men Unlimited (1993) #2; X-Men (1991) #25; Wolverine (1988) #75; Excalibur (1988) #71	November 26, 2019	978-1302919726
Phalanx Covenant	Uncanny X-Men (1981) #305-306, #312-313, #316-317; Excalibur (1988) #78-80, #82; X-Men (1991) #36-37; X-Factor (1986) #106; X-Force (1991) #38; Wolverine (1988) #85; Cable (1993) #16	December 31, 2019	978-1302920548
Onslaught	Uncanny X-Men (1981) #333-337; X-Men (1991) #53-57; Onslaught: X-Men #1; Onslaught: Marvel Universe #1; Onslaught: Epilogue #1; Avengers (1963) #401; Fantastic Four (1961) #415; Wolverine (1988) #104 and Cable (1993) #35	January 22, 2020	978-1302921927
Operation: Zero Tolerance	Generation X (1994) 27; X-Men (1991) 65–70; Uncanny X-Men (1981) 346; Wolverine (1988) 115–118; Cable (1993) 45-47	February 26, 2020	978-1302923969
Messiah Complex	X-Men: Messiah Complex One-Shot (2007); Uncanny X-Men (1981) 492–494; X-Men (1991) 205–207; New X-Men (2004) 44–46; X-Factor (2005) 25-27	March 18, 2020	978-1302922801
Messiah War	X-Force/Cable: Messiah War (2009) 1; Cable (2008) 13–15; X-Force (2008) 14–16; X-Men: Future History - The Messiah War Sourcebook (2009) 1	May 26, 2020	978-1302922849
Necrosha	New X-Men (2004) 32; New Mutants (2009) 6–8; X-Force (2008) 11, 21–25; X-Men: Legacy (2008) 231–234; X-Necrosha (2009); X-Necrosha: The Gathering (2009)	September 1, 2020	978-1302923952
Second Coming	Second Coming: Prepare (2009), Second Coming (2010) 1–2, Uncanny X-Men (1981) 523–525, New Mutants (2009) 12–14, X-Men Legacy (2008) 235–237, X-Force (2008) 26-28	September 9, 2020	978-1302923976
Age of X	Age of X Alpha (2011) 1, X-Men Legacy (2008) 245–247, New Mutants (2009) 22–24, Age of X: Universe(2011) 1-2	October 14, 2020	978-1302923938

==== Other trade paperbacks ====
===== Volume 1 =====
Title	Material collected	Publication date	ISBN
X-Men Visionaries: Neal Adams	X-Men #56–63, 65	July 1996	978-0785101987
X-Men: The Dark Phoenix Saga	Uncanny X-Men #129–137	April 2006	0-7851-2213-3
X-Men: Days of Future Past	Uncanny X-Men #138–143, Uncanny X-Men Annual #4	October 2004	0-7851-1560-9
X-Men: Starjammers by Dave Cockrum	Uncanny X-Men #107-8, 154–158, 161–167; X-Men: Spotlight on Starjammers #1-2	October 2019	978-1-302-92046-3
Uncanny X-Men: From the Ashes	Uncanny X-Men #168–176	March 1991	0-8713-5615-5
Power Pack Classic Volume 2	Uncanny X-Men #195; Power Pack #11–17; Power Pack & Cloak and Dagger: Shelter from the Storm	May 2010	978-0785145929
X-Men: Ghosts	Uncanny X-Men #199–209, Uncanny X-Men Annual #10	May 2013	978-0-7851-8449-2
X-Men: Mutant Massacre	Uncanny X-Men #210–214; X-Factor #9-11; New Mutants #46; Thor #373–374; Power Pack #27; Daredevil #238	February 12, 2013	978-0785167419
X-Men: Fall of the Mutants Volume 1	Uncanny X-Men #220–227; Incredible Hulk (vol. 2) #340; New Mutants #55–61	February 26, 2013	978-0785167440
X-Men vs. the Brood: Day of Wrath	Uncanny X-Men #232–234; X-Men vs. Brood #1–2	September 1997	0-7851-0558-1
X-Men: Inferno Prologue	Uncanny X-Men #228-238; X-Factor #27-32; New Mutants #62-70; New Mutants Annual #4; Uncanny X-Men Annual #12	December 2014	0-7851-9273-5
X-Men: Inferno	Uncanny X-Men #239–243; X-Factor #36–39; New Mutants #71–73	December 1996	0-7851-0222-1
X-Men Visionaries: Jim Lee	Uncanny X-Men #248, 256–258, 268–269, 273–277	October 2002	978-0785109211
X-Men: Mutations	Uncanny X-Men #256–258; Amazing Adventures (vol. 2) #11, 17; X-Factor #15, 24–25	October 1996	0-7851-0197-7
X-Men: Psylocke	Psylocke #1-4, Uncanny X-Men (1963) #256-258	2010	978-0785144397
X-Men: Gambit Classic	Uncanny X-Men #265–267; Gambit #1–4	May 2009	0-7851-3729-7
X-Men: X-Tinction Agenda	Uncanny X-Men #270–272; X-Factor #60–62; New Mutants #95–97	December 1998	0-7851-0053-9
X-Men: Crossroads	Uncanny X-Men #273–277	September 1998	0-7851-0662-6
X-Men: The Coming of Bishop	Uncanny X-Men #282–283, 286 (plus pages regarding Bishop from #284–285 and 287)	March 1995	0-7851-0099-7
X-Men: Bishop's Crossing	Uncanny X-Men #281–293; X-Men (vol. 2) #8	November 2016	978-1302901707
X-Men: X-Cutioner's Song	Uncanny X-Men #294–296 (new printing includes #297); X-Factor #84–86; X-Men (vol. 2) #14–16; X-Force #16–18	May 1994 (new printing December 2016)	0-7851-0025-3 (new printing 978-1302900304)
X-Men: Fatal Attractions	Uncanny X-Men #304; X-Factor #92; X-Force #25; X-Men (vol. 2) #25; Wolverine (vol. 2) #75; Excalibur #71	January 1995	0-7851-0065-2
Avengers/X-Men: Bloodties	Uncanny X-Men #307; X-Men (vol. 2) #26; Avengers #368–369; West Coast Avengers #101	April 1995	0-7851-0103-9
X-Men: The Wedding of Cyclops & Phoenix	Uncanny X-Men #308–310, Uncanny X-Men Annual #18; X-Men (vol. 2) #27–30, X-Men Annual #2; X-Men Unlimited #3; X-Men: The Wedding Album; What If (vol. 2) #60	October 2012	978-0-7851-6290-2
Origin of Generation X: Tales of the Phalanx Covenant	Uncanny X-Men #316–317; X-Men (vol. 2) #36–37; X-Factor #106; X-Force #38; Excalibur #82; Wolverine (vol. 2) #85; Cable #16; Generation X #1	June 2001	0-7851-0216-7
X-Men: Legion Quest	Uncanny X-Men #320–321; X-Factor #109; X-Men (vol. 2) #40–41	March 1996	0-7851-0179-9
X-Men: Age of Apocalypse Prelude	Uncanny X-Men #319–321; X-Factor #108–109; X-Men (vol. 2) #38–41; Cable #20; X-Men: Age of Apocalypse Ashcan Edition	May 2011	978-0-7851-5508-9
X-Men: Road to Onslaught Volume 1	Uncanny X-Men #322–326; X-Men: Prime; X-Men (vol. 2) #42–45; X-Men Annual '95; X-Men Unlimited #8	February 2014	978-0-7851-8825-4
X-Men: Road to Onslaught Volume 2	Uncanny X-Men #327–328; X-Men/Clandestine #1–2; X-Men (vol. 2) #46–49; X-Men Annual '95; X-Men Unlimited #9; Sabretooth #1	July 2014	978-07851-8830-8
X-Men: Road to Onslaught Volume 3	Uncanny X-Men #329–332; X-Men/Brood #1–2; X-Men (vol. 2) #50–52; Wolverine (vol. 2) #101; X-Men Unlimited #10; Archangel #1; Xavier Institute Alumni Yearbook	January 2015	978-07851-9005-9
X-Men Visionaries: Joe Madureira	Uncanny X-Men #325–326, 329–330, 341–343	August 2000	0-7851-0748-7
X-Men: Prelude to Onslaught	Uncanny X-Men #333; X-Men (vol. 2) #50; X-Man #15–17; Cable #32–33	March 2010	978-0785144632
X-Men: The Complete Onslaught Epic Vol. 1	Uncanny X-Men #334–335; X-Men (vol. 2) #53–54; Avengers #400–401; Onslaught: X-Men; X-Force #57; Cable #34; The Incredible Hulk (vol. 2) #444; Fantastic Four #414–415	December 2007	0-7851-2823-9
X-Men: The Complete Onslaught Epic Vol. 2	Uncanny X-Men #336; Excalibur #100; Fantastic Four #415; The Amazing Spider-Man #415; The Sensational Spider-Man #8; Spider-Man #72; Green Goblin #12; Punisher #11; X-Factor #125–126; Wolverine (vol. 2) #104; X-Man #17; X-Men (vol. 2) #55; X-Force #58	June 2008	0-7851-2824-7
X-Men: The Complete Onslaught Epic Vol. 3	Uncanny X-Men #336; Avengers #402; The Incredible Hulk (vol. 2) #445; Iron Man #332; Thor #502; Wolverine (vol. 2) #105; Cable #35; X-Men (vol. 2) #55; X-Man #19; X-Force #57	August 2008	0-7851-2825-5
X-Men: The Complete Onslaught Epic Vol. 4	Uncanny X-Men #337; Fantastic Four #416; Iron Man (vol. 2) #6; Cable #36; X-Men (vol. 2) #56–57; Onslaught: Epilogue #1; Onslaught: Marvel #1; X-Men: Road to Onslaught #1	February 2009	0-7851-2826-3
X-Men: Onslaught Aftermath	Uncanny X-Men #338-340 and Annual '96-'97; X-Men (vol. 2) #58-61 and Annual '97; X-Men Unlimited #12-14; X-Factor #130	March 20, 2019	978-1302916510
X-Men: The Trial of Gambit	Uncanny X-Men #341-350, -1; X-Men (vol. 2) #62-64, -1	August 2, 2016	978-1302900700
X-Men: Operation Zero Tolerance	Uncanny X-Men #346, Generation X #26–31, X-Force #67–70, X-Men (vol. 2) 65–70, Wolverine (vol. 2) #115–118, Cable #45–47, X-Man #30	August 2012	978-0785162407
X-Men Blue Vol. 0: Reunion	Uncanny X-Men #351-359; X-Men Unlimited #17; Uncanny X-Men/Fantastic Four Annual 1998; Cerebro's Guide to the X-Men	March, 2018	978-1302909536
X-Men: The Hunt for Professor X	Uncanny X-Men #360-365, X-Men #80-84, 1/2, X-Men Unlimited #22	June 30, 2015	978-0785197201
Magneto: Rogue Nation	Uncanny X-Men #366–367; Magneto Rex #1–3; X-Men: The Magneto War; X-Men (vol. 2) #85–87	March 2002	0-7851-0834-3
X-Men: The Magneto War	Uncanny X-Men #366–371; Magneto Rex #1–3; X-Men: The Magneto War; X-Men (vol. 2) #85–91; X-Men Annual '99; X-Men Unlimited #23 and material from #24	October 2018	978-1302913762
Deathlok: Rage Against the Machine	Uncanny X-Men #371; X-Men (vol. 2) #91; X-Men Annual '99; Cable #58–62; Deathlok #1-11	February 2015	978-0-7851-9291-6
X-Men: The Shattering	Uncanny X-Men #372–375; X-Men (vol. 2) #92–95; Astonishing X-Men #1–3; X-Men 1999 Yearbook	July 2009	0-7851-3733-5
Astonishing X-Men: Deathwish (Apocalypse: The Twelve Prelude)	Uncanny X-Men #375; X-Men (vol. 2) #92, 95; Astonishing X-Men (vol. 2) #1–3	October 2000	0-7851-0754-1
X-Men vs. Apocalypse Vol. 1: The Twelve	Uncanny X-Men #376–377; Cable #75–76; X-Men (vol. 2) #96–97; Wolverine (vol. 2) #146–147	March 2007	0-7851-2263-X
X-Men vs. Apocalypse Vol. 2: Ages of Apocalypse	Uncanny X-Men #378; Cable #77; Wolverine (vol. 2) #148; X-Men Unlimited #26; X-Men (vol. 2) #98; X-Men: The Search for Cyclops #1–4	October 2008	0-7851-2264-8
X-Men: Powerless	Uncanny X-Men #379–380; Cable #78; X-Force #101; Wolverine (vol. 2) #149; X-Men (vol. 2) #99	August 2010	0-7851-4677-6
Avengers/X-Men: Maximum Security	Uncanny X-Men #387; Maximum Security: Dangerous Planet #1–3; Captain America (vol. 3) #36; Thor (vol. 2) #30; Bishop: The Last X-Man #15; Iron Man (vol. 3) #35; Avengers (vol. 4) #35; Gambit (vol. 3) #23; X-Men (vol. 2) #107; X-Men Unlimited #29	November 2010	0-7851-4499-4
X-Men: Dream's End	Uncanny X-Men #388–390; Cable #87; Bishop #16; X-Men (vol. 2) #108–110	December 2004	0-7851-1551-X
X-Men: Eve of Destruction	Uncanny X-Men #391–393; X-Men (vol. 2) #111–113	May 2005	0-7851-1552-8
Poptopia (Uncanny X-Men)	Uncanny X-Men #394–399	February 2002	0-7851-0801-7
X-Men: X-Corps	Uncanny X-Men #394–409, Uncanny X-Men Annual 2001	October 2013	978-0785185024
Uncanny X-Men Vol. 1: Hope	Uncanny X-Men #410–415	January 2003	0-7851-1060-7
Uncanny X-Men Vol. 2: Dominant Species	Uncanny X-Men #416–420	July 2003	0-7851-1132-8
X-Men - Unstoppable	Uncanny X-Men (1981) #410-424, X-Men Unlimited (1993) #44-45	February 12, 2019	978-1302916121
Uncanny X-Men Vol. 3: Holy War	Uncanny X-Men #421–427	October 2003	0-7851-1133-6
Uncanny X-Men Vol. 4: The Draco	Uncanny X-Men #428–434	March 2004	0-7851-1134-4
X-Men: Trial of the Juggernaut	Uncanny X-Men #425-436; Exiles #28-30; material from X-Men Unlimited #40, 48	October 2019	978-1302920371
Uncanny X-Men Vol. 5: She Lies with Angels	Uncanny X-Men #437–441	July 2004	0-7851-1196-4
Uncanny X-Men Vol. 6: Bright New Mourning	Uncanny X-Men #435–436, 442–443; New X-Men #155–156	August 2004	0-7851-1406-8
X-Men: Reloaded	Uncanny X-Men #437-443, New X-Men #155–156, X-Men 157-164	September 2020	978-1302924010
Uncanny X-Men – The New Age Vol. 1: The End of History	Uncanny X-Men #444–449	December 2004	0-7851-1535-8
X-Men: Reload By Chris Claremont Vol. 1: The End of History	Uncanny X-Men (1981) #444-461, X-Men (1991) #165	December 2018	9781302913786
Uncanny X-Men – The New Age Vol. 2: The Cruelest Cut	Uncanny X-Men #450–454	February 2005	0-7851-1645-1
Uncanny X-Men – The New Age Vol. 3: On Ice	Uncanny X-Men #455–461	August 2005	0-7851-1649-4
X-Men: Reload By Chris Claremont Vol. 2: House of M	Uncanny X-Men (1981) #462-474, Decimation: House of M - The Day After #1, Uncanny X-Men Annual (2006) #1	December 2019	978-1302920531
House of M: Uncanny X-Men	Uncanny X-Men #462–465; Secrets of the House of M	February 2006	0-7851-1663-X
Uncanny X-Men – The New Age Vol. 4: End of Greys	Uncanny X-Men #466–471	June 2006	0-7851-1664-8
Uncanny X-Men – The New Age Vol. 5: First Foursaken	Uncanny X-Men #472–474, Uncanny X-Men Annual #1	October 2006	0-7851-2323-7
Uncanny X-Men: Rise and Fall of the Shi'ar Empire	Uncanny X-Men #475–486	January 2008	978-0-7851-1800-8
Uncanny X-Men: The Extremists	Uncanny X-Men #487–491	December 2007	0-7851-1982-5
X-Men: Endangered Species	X-Men (vol. 2) #200–204; Uncanny X-Men #488–491; New X-Men (vol. 2) #40–42; X-Factor (vol. 3) #21–24; X-Men: Endangered Species one-shot	????	9780785128205
X-Men: Messiah Complex	X-Men: Messiah Complex (one-shot); Uncanny X-Men #492–494; X-Men #205–207; New X-Men #44–46; X-Factor #25–27; X-Men: Messiah Complex – Mutant Files	November 2008	0-7851-2320-2
Uncanny X-Men: Divided We Stand	Uncanny X-Men #495–499	October 2008	0-7851-1983-3
Uncanny X-Men: Manifest Destiny	Uncanny X-Men #500–503; X-Men Free Comic Book Day #1; X-Men: Manifest Destiny #1–5	October 2009	0-7851-2451-9
Uncanny X-Men: Lovelorn	Uncanny X-Men #504–507, Uncanny X-Men Annual #2	June 2009	0-7851-2999-5
Uncanny X-Men: Sisterhood	Uncanny X-Men #508–512	August 2009	0-7851-4105-7
Uncanny X-Men: The Complete Collection by Matt Fraction Vol. 1	Uncanny X-Men #500–511, Uncanny X-Men Annual #2, X-Men Unlimited #9, Divided We Stand #1	March 2013	0-7851-6593-2
Uncanny X-Men: The Complete Collection by Matt Fraction Vol. 2	Uncanny X-Men #512–519, Dark Avengers/Uncanny X-Men: Utopia, Dark Avengers/Uncanny X-Men: Exodus, Dark Avengers #7-8, Dark Reign: The List - X-Men, material from Dark Reign: The Cabal	April 2013	0-7851-6594-0
Dark Avengers/Uncanny X-Men: Utopia	Uncanny X-Men #513–514; Dark Avengers #7–8; Dark Avengers/Uncanny X-Men: Utopia; Utopia Finale	April 2010	0-7851-4234-7
Uncanny X-Men: Nation X	Uncanny X-Men #515–522; Dark Reign: The List – X-Men; Nation X #1–4	November 2010	0-7851-4103-0
Uncanny X-Men: The Complete Collection by Matt Fraction Vol. 3	Uncanny X-Men #520-522,526–534, Uncanny X-Men: The Heroic Age (one-shot)	June 2013	0-7851-8450-3
X-Men: Second Coming	Second Coming: Prepare, Second Coming #1–2, Uncanny X-Men #523–525, New Mutants #12–14, X-Men: Legacy #235–237, X-Force #26–28	June 2011	0785157050
Uncanny X-Men: The Five Lights (a.k.a. Uncanny X-Men: The Birth of Generation Hope)	Uncanny X-Men #526–529; Uncanny X-Men: The Heroic Age (one-shot)	December 2010	978-0-7851-4643-8
Uncanny X-Men: Quarantine	Uncanny X-Men #530–534	June 2011	0-7851-5225-3
Uncanny X-Men: Breaking Point	Uncanny X-Men #534.1; 535–539	September 2011	978-0-7851-5226-2
Fear Itself: Uncanny X-Men	Uncanny X-Men #540–544	March 2012	0-7851-5797-2

===== Volume 2 =====
Title	Material collected	Publication date	ISBN
Uncanny X-Men Vol. 1: Everything is Sinister	Uncanny X-Men (vol. 2) #1–4	March 28, 2012	Hardcover: 978-0785159933 Paperback: 978-0785159940
Uncanny X-Men Vol. 2: Tabula Rasa	Uncanny X-Men (vol. 2) #5–10	June 20, 2012	Hardcover: 978-0785159957 Paperback: 978-0785159964
Uncanny X-Men Vol. 3: AvX: Book 1	Uncanny X-Men (vol. 2) #11–14	October 3, 2012	Hardcover: 978-0785159971 Paperback: 978-0785159988
Uncanny X-Men Vol. 4: AvX: Book 2	Uncanny X-Men (vol. 2) #15–20	December 12, 2012	Hardcover: 978-0785165293 Paperback: 978-0785165309
Uncanny X-Men by Kieron Gillen - The Complete Collection Vol. 1	S.W.O.R.D. #1-5, Uncanny X-Men (vol. 1) #534.1 and 535-544, X-Men: Regenesis #1, Uncanny X-Men (vol. 2) #1-3	February 19, 2019	Paperback: 978-1302916497
Uncanny X-Men by Kieron Gillen - The Complete Collection Vol. 2	Uncanny X-Men (vol. 2) #4-20, AvX: Consequences #1-5	February 19, 2020	

===== Volume 3 =====
Title	Material collected	Publication date	ISBN
Uncanny X-Men Volume 1: Revolution	Uncanny X-Men (vol. 3) #1–5	July 23, 2013	Hardcover: 978-0785168461 Paperback: 978-0785167020
Uncanny X-Men Volume 2: Broken	Uncanny X-Men (vol. 3) #6–11	November 26, 2013	Hardcover: 978-0785167853 Paperback: 978-0785167037
X-Men: Battle of the Atom	X-Men: Battle of the Atom #1-2; All-New X-Men #16-17; X-Men (vol. 4) #5-6; Uncanny X-Men (vol. 3) #12-13; Wolverine and the X-Men #36-37	January 21, 2014	Hardcover: 978-0785189060 Paperback: 978-1846535727
Uncanny X-Men Volume 3: The Good, the Bad, the Inhuman	Uncanny X-Men (vol. 3) #14–18	May 27, 2014	Hardcover: 978-0785154310 Paperback: 978-0785189374
Uncanny X-Men Volume 4: X-Men vs. S.H.I.E.L.D.	Uncanny X-Men (vol. 3) #19-25	October 7, 2014	Hardcover: 978-1846536281 Paperback: 978-0785189381
Uncanny X-Men/Iron Man/Nova: No End in Sight	Uncanny X-Men Special #1; Iron Man Special #1; Nova Special #1	November 18, 2014	Paperback: 978-0785191056
Uncanny X-Men Volume 5: The Omega Mutant	Uncanny X-Men (vol. 3) #26-31	April 7, 2015	Hardcover: 978-0785154907 Paperback: 978-0785189398
Uncanny X-Men Volume 6: Storyville	Uncanny X-Men (vol. 3) #32-35; Uncanny X-Men #600	August 11, 2015	Hardcover: 978-0785192305 Paperback: 978-0785192312

===== Volume 4 =====
Title	Material collected	Pages	Publication date	ISBN
Uncanny X-Men: Superior Vol. 1 - Survival of the Fittest	Uncanny X-Men (vol. 4) #1–5	112	July 12, 2016	Paperback: 978-0785196075
X-Men: Apocalypse Wars	All-New X-Men (vol. 2) #9-11, Extraordinary X-Men #8-12, Uncanny X-Men (vol. 4) #6-10	336	October 18, 2016	Hardcover: 978-1302902452
Uncanny X-Men: Superior Vol. 2 - Apocalypse Wars	Uncanny X-Men (vol. 4) #6–10	112	November 29, 2016	Paperback: 978-0785196082
Uncanny X-Men: Superior Vol. 3 - Waking from the Dream	Uncanny X-Men (vol. 4) #11–15, Uncanny X-Men Annual (vol. 4) #1	112	February 7, 2017	Paperback: 978-1302903138
Uncanny X-Men: Superior Vol. 4 - IvX	Uncanny X-Men (vol. 4) #16–19, Uncanny X-Men Annual (vol. 4) #1	128	July 5, 2017	Paperback: 978-1302905255

===== Volume 5 =====
Title	Material collected	Pages	Publication date	ISBN
Uncanny X-Men: Disassembled	Uncanny X-Men (vol. 5) #1–10	248	April 2, 2019	Paperback: 978-1302914868
Uncanny X-Men: Cyclops and Wolverine Volume 1	Uncanny X-Men (vol. 5) #11–16	136	July 2, 2019	Paperback: 978-1302915827
Uncanny X-Men: Cyclops and Wolverine Volume 2	Uncanny X-Men (vol. 5) #17–22	136	October 1, 2019	Paperback: 978-1302915834
War of the Realms: Uncanny X-Men	War of the Realms: Uncanny X-Men #1–3; Uncanny X-Men (vol. 5) #17; War of the Realms: War Scrolls #2 (B- and C-stories only)	112	November 12, 2019	Paperback: 978-1302919191

=== Hardcovers ===
==== Marvel Masterworks ====
Title	Volume	Material collected	Pages	Publication date	ISBN
Marvel Masterworks: The X-Men	1	The X-Men #1–10	241	May 2002	0-7851-0845-9
Marvel Masterworks: The X-Men	2	The X-Men #11–21	240	November 2003	0-7851-0983-8
Marvel Masterworks: The X-Men	3	The X-Men #22–31	224	September 2003	0-7851-1269-3
Marvel Masterworks: The X-Men	4	The X-Men #32–42	240	September 2004	0-7851-1607-9
Marvel Masterworks: The X-Men	5	The X-Men #43–53; The Avengers #53; Ka-Zar #2–3; Marvel Tales #30	304	July 2005	0-7851-1787-3
Marvel Masterworks: The X-Men	6	The X-Men #54–66	320	January 2006	0-7851-2056-4
Marvel Masterworks: The X-Men	7	Amazing Adventures (vol. 2) #11–17; Incredible Hulk (vol. 2) #150, 161; Amazing Spider-Man #92; Marvel Team-Up #4; The X-Men #67–80, The X-Men Annual #1–2 (covers only)	256	October 2008	0-7851-3048-9
Marvel Masterworks: The X-Men	8	Avengers #110–111; Incredible Hulk (vol. 2) #172, 180–181; Captain America #172–175; Marvel Team-Up #23, 38; Defenders #15–16; Giant-Size Fantastic Four #4; The X-Men #81–93 (covers only)	304	March 2010	0-7851-4222-3
Marvel Masterworks: The Uncanny X-Men	1	Giant-Size X-Men #1; Uncanny X-Men #94–100	176	December 2003	0-7851-1192-1
Marvel Masterworks: The Uncanny X-Men	2	Uncanny X-Men #101–110	192	December 2004	0-7851-1193-X
Marvel Masterworks: The Uncanny X-Men	3	Uncanny X-Men #111–121	208	March 2004	0-7851-1194-8
Marvel Masterworks: The Uncanny X-Men	4	Uncanny X-Men #122–131, Uncanny X-Men Annual #3	224	October 2004	0-7851-1630-3
Marvel Masterworks: The Uncanny X-Men	5	Uncanny X-Men #132–140, Uncanny X-Men Annual #4; Phoenix: The Untold Story (one-shot)	312	January 2005	0-7851-1698-2
Marvel Masterworks: The Uncanny X-Men	6	Uncanny X-Men #141–150	256	January 2008	978-0785130130
Marvel Masterworks: The Uncanny X-Men	7	Uncanny X-Men #151–159, Uncanny X-Men Annual #5; Avengers Annual #10	304	January 2011	978-0785135135
Marvel Masterworks: The Uncanny X-Men	8	Uncanny X-Men #160–167, Uncanny X-Men Annual #6; X-Men Special Edition #1; Marvel Treasury Edition #26–27	288	February 2012	978-0785158707
Marvel Masterworks: The Uncanny X-Men	9	Uncanny X-Men #168–175, Uncanny X-Men Annual #7; Marvel Graphic Novel No. 5 - X-Men: God Loves, Man Kills; Wolverine (vol. 2) #1–4	432	January 2015	978-0785191544
Marvel Masterworks: The Uncanny X-Men	10	Uncanny X-Men #176–188; Magik #1–4; material from Marvel Fanfare #40	456	February 2017	978-1302903602
Marvel Masterworks: The Uncanny X-Men	11	Uncanny X-Men #189–193, Uncanny X-Men Annual #8; X-Men/Alpha Flight #1–2; Kitty Pryde and Wolverine #1–6	464	January 2019	978-1302915186
Marvel Masterworks: The Uncanny X-Men	12	Uncanny X-Men #194–200, Uncanny X-Men Annual #9, New Mutants Special Edition #1, Nightcrawler #1–4, material from Bizarre Adventures #27	464	March 2020	978-1302922382
Marvel Masterworks: The Uncanny X-Men	13	Uncanny X-Men #201–209, Longshot #1–6, material from Marvel Fanfare #33	496	June 2021	978-1302929459
Marvel Masterworks: The Uncanny X-Men	14	Uncanny X-Men #210-219, Uncanny X-Men Annual #10, New Mutants Annual #2 and Fantastic Four vs. X-Men #1-4	496	April 2022	978-1302933449
Marvel Masterworks: The Uncanny X-Men	15	Uncanny X-Men #220-231, X-Men Annual #11, X-Men vs. Avengers #1-4 and material from Best of Marvel Comics.	520	March 14, 2023	978-1302949228
Marvel Masterworks: The Uncanny X-Men	16	Uncanny X-Men #232-243, X-Men Annual #12, X-Factor #37-39	496	March 26, 2024	978-1302955151

==== Oversized hardcovers (OHCs) ====
Title	Material collected	Pages	Publication date	ISBN
X-Men: The Dark Phoenix Saga	Uncanny X-Men #129–138; Classic X-Men #43; material from Bizarre Adventures #27; Phoenix: The Untold Story (one-shot); What If? #27	352	July 2010	978-0785149132
X-Men: Asgardian Wars	X-Men/Alpha Flight #1–2; New Mutants Special Edition #1; Uncanny X-Men Annual #9	248	February 2010	978-0785141488
X-Men: Mutant Massacre	Uncanny X-Men #210-214, X-Factor #9-11, New Mutants #46, Thor #373-374, Power Pack #27, and Daredevil #238	320	January 2010	0-7851-3805-6
X-Men: Fall of the Mutants	Uncanny X-Men #220–227; New Mutants #55–61; X-Factor #18–26; Captain America #339; Daredevil #252; Fantastic Four #312; Incredible Hulk (vol. 2) #340; Power Pack #35	824	October 2011	978-0785153122
X-Men: Inferno Prologue	Uncanny X-Men #228-238, Annual #12; New Mutants #62-70, Annual #4; X-Factor #27-32, Annual #3; material from Marvel Age Annual #4 and Marvel Fanfare #40	824	December 2014	978-0785192732
X-Men: Inferno	Uncanny X-Men #239–243; New Mutants #71–73; X-Factor #33–40, material from Annual #4; X-Terminators #1–4	600	June 2009	978-0785137771
X-Men: Inferno Crossovers	Power Pack (1984) #40, 42–44; Avengers (1963) #298-300; Fantastic Four (1961) #322-324; Amazing Spider-Man (1963) #311-313; Spectacular Spider-Man (1976) #146-148; Web of Spider-Man (1985) #47-48; Daredevil (1964) #262-263, 265; Excalibur (1988) #6-7; Mutant Misadventures of Cloak and Dagger (1988) #4	608	September 2010	978-0785146711
X-Men: Days of Future Past	Uncanny X-Men #141–142, Uncanny X-Men Annual #14; X-Factor Annual #5; New Mutants Annual #6; material from Fantastic Four Annual #23; Excalibur #52, 66–67; Wolverine: Days of Future Past #1–3; material from Hulk: Broken Worlds #2	392	March 2014	978-0785184423
X-Men: X-Tinction Agenda	Uncanny X-Men #235–238 and 270–272; New Mutants #95–97; X-Factor #60–62	304	August 2011	978-0785155317
X-Men: Bishop's Crossing	Uncanny X-Men #281–293, X-Men (vol. 2) #12–13 and material from #10–11	392	October 2012	978-0785153498
X-Men: X-Cutioner's Song	Uncanny X-Men #294–297; X-Factor #84–86; X-Men (vol. 2) #14–16; X-Force #16–18; Stryfe's Strike File	368	October 2011	978-0785153122
X-Men: Fatal Attractions	Uncanny X-Men #298–305 and 315, Annual #17; X-Factor #87–92; X-Men Unlimited #1–2; X-Force #25; X-Men (vol. 2) #25; Wolverine (vol. 2) #75; Excalibur #71	816	April 2012	978-0785162452
X-Men: The Wedding of Cyclops & Phoenix	Uncanny X-Men #307-310, Annual #18; X-Men (vol. 2) #26-35; Avengers #368-369; Avengers West Coast #101; Cable #6-8; X-Men Unlimited #3; X-Men: The Wedding Album; What If? (vol. 2) #60; The Adventures of Cyclops and Phoenix #1-4; material from Marvel Valentine Special	832	September 2018	978-1302913229
X-Men: Phalanx Covenant	Uncanny X-Men #306, 311–314, 316–317; Excalibur #78–82; X-Men (vol. 2) #36–37; X-Factor #106; X-Force #38; Wolverine (vol. 2) #85; Cable #16	552	February 2014	978-0785185499
X-Men: LegionQuest	Uncanny X-Men #318–321; X-Men (vol. 2) #38-41, X-Men Annual #3; X-Men Unlimited #4-7; X-Factor #107-109; Cable #20	592	April 2018	978-1302910389
X-Men: Operation Zero Tolerance	Uncanny X-Men #346; X-Men (vol. 2) #65–70; Generation X #26–31; X-Force #67–70; Wolverine (vol. 2) #115–118; Cable #45–47; X-Man #30	640	April 2012	978-0785162407
X-Men: Eve of Destruction	Uncanny X-Men #390-393 and Annual 2000; X-Men (vol. 2) #110-113; X-Men Unlimited #30-33; X-Men: Forever #1-6; X-Men: Declassified; X-Men: The Search for Cyclops #1-4; Magneto: Dark Seduction #1-4	808	July 2019	978-1302918255
House of M	House of M #1–8; The Pulse Special Edition; Secrets of the House of M	312	January 2008	978-0785124665
House of M: Spider-Man, Fantastic Four, and X-Men	Uncanny X-Men #462–465; Spider-Man: House of M #1–5; New Thunderbolts #11; Fantastic Four: House of M #1–3; Black Panther #7	344	December 2009	978-0785138815
Uncanny X-Men: Rise & Fall of the Shi'Ar Empire	Uncanny X-Men #475–486	312	July 2007	0-7851-2515-9
X-Men: Messiah Complex	X-Men: Messiah Complex (one-shot); Uncanny X-Men #492–494; X-Men (vol. 2) #205–207; New X-Men #44–46; X-Factor #25–27	352	April 2008	0-7851-2899-9
Uncanny X-Men: Manifest Destiny	Uncanny X-Men #500–503; X-Men Free Comic Book Day #1; X-Men: Manifest Destiny #1–5	200	May 2009	0-7851-3817-X
Dark Avengers/Uncanny X-Men: Utopia	Uncanny X-Men #513–514; Dark Avengers #7–8; Dark Avengers/Uncanny X-Men: Utopia; Utopia Finale	368	November 2009	0-7851-4233-9
Uncanny X-Men: Nation X	Uncanny X-Men #515–522; Dark Reign: The List – X-Men; Nation X #1–4	360	June 2010	0-7851-3873-0
X-Men: Second Coming	Second Coming: Prepare, Second Coming #1–2, Uncanny X-Men #523–525, New Mutants #12–14, X-Men: Legacy #235–237, X-Force #26–28	392	September 2010	0-7851-4678-4
Avengers vs. X-Men	Avengers vs X-Men #0-12; Avengers vs X-Men: Vs #1-6; Avengers vs X-Men: Infinite #1, 6 and 10; material from Point One #1	568	November 2012	978-0785168058
Avengers vs X-Men Companion	Uncanny X-Men (vol. 2) #11-20; AVX: Consequences #1-5; X-Men Legacy #266-270; Wolverine & The X-Men #9-16, 18; A-Babies VS. X-Babies #1; Avengers Academy #29-33; Secret Avengers #26-28; Avengers #25-30; New Avengers #24-30	1112	May 2013	978-0785168515
Uncanny X-Men by Bendis Vol.1	Uncanny X-Men (vol. 3) #1-11, 14, 15.INH, 16-18	360	February 2016	978-0785195320
X-Men: Battle of the Atom	Uncanny X-Men (vol. 3) #12-13; X-Men: Battle of the Atom #1-2; All-New X-Men #16-17; X-Men (vol. 4) #5-6; Wolverine and the X-Men #36-37	248	January 2014	978-0785189060
Uncanny X-Men by Bendis Vol.2	Uncanny X-Men (vol. 3) #19-35, 600, Annual #1; All-New X-Men Annual #1	496	December 2016	978-1302901714
X-Men: Apocalypse Wars	Uncanny X-Men (vol. 4) #6-10; Extraordinary X-Men #8-12; All-New X-Men (vol. 2) #9-11	328	September 2016	978-1302902452
Uncanny X-Men: Disassembled	Uncanny X-Men (vol. 5) #1-10	272	March 2021	978-1302915018

==== Omnibus editions ====
Title	Material collected	Pages	Publication date	ISBN
The X-Men Omnibus Vol. 1	The X-Men #1–31	768	October 2008	978-0785129585
The X-Men Omnibus Vol. 1	The X-Men #1–31	776	January 2022	978-1302932893
The X-Men Omnibus Vol. 2	The X-Men #32–66; Avengers #53; Ka-Zar #2–3; Marvel Tales #30; Not Brand Echh #4, #8	912	May 2011	978-0785153078
The X-Men Omnibus Vol. 2	The X-Men #32–66; Avengers #53; Ka-Zar #2–3; Marvel Tales #30; Not Brand Echh #4, #8	920	February 2022	978-1302933739
Uncanny X-Men Omnibus Vol. 1	Giant-Size X-Men #1; Uncanny X-Men #94–131, Annual #3	848	May 2006	978-0785121015
Uncanny X-Men Omnibus Vol. 1	Giant-Size X-Men #1; Uncanny X-Men #94–131, Annual #3	848	September 2013	978-0785185697
Uncanny X-Men Omnibus Vol. 1	Giant-Size X-Men #1; Uncanny X-Men #94–131, Annual #3	848	May 2016	978-1302900830
Uncanny X-Men Omnibus Vol. 1	Giant-Size X-Men #1; Uncanny X-Men #94–131, Annual #3	848	July 2020	978-1302924805
X-Men: The Dark Phoenix Saga Omnibus	Uncanny X-Men #97–105, 107–108, 125–138; Phoenix: The Untold Story (one-shot); material from Classic X-Men #6, 8, 13, 18, 24, 43; material from Bizarre Adventures #27; What If? #27	688	August 2018	978-1302912123
Phoenix Omnibus Volume 1	Uncanny X-Men #97–105, 107–108, 125–138; Phoenix: The Untold Story (one-shot); material from Classic X-Men #6, 8, 13, 18, 24, 43; material from Bizarre Adventures #27; What If? #27	688	May 2022	978-1302945763
Phoenix Omnibus Volume 2	Uncanny X-Men #141-142, 168–176, 184, 189, 201–203, 207–209, 221–222, 239–243; Avengers #263, Fantastic Four #286, X-Factor #1, 13, 18, 35–39; Excalibur #42-50, 66-67		2023	
Uncanny X-Men Omnibus Vol. 2	Uncanny X-Men #132–153, Annual #4–5; Avengers Annual #10; Marvel Fanfare #1–4; Marvel Treasury Edition #26–27; Marvel Team-Up #100; material from Bizarre Adventures #27; Phoenix: The Untold Story (one-shot)	912	April 2014	978-0785185727
Uncanny X-Men Omnibus Vol. 2	Uncanny X-Men #132–153, Annual #4–5; Avengers Annual #10; Marvel Fanfare #1–4; Marvel Treasury Edition #26–27; Marvel Team-Up #100; material from Bizarre Adventures #27; Phoenix: The Untold Story (one-shot)	912	October 2016	978-1302901660
Uncanny X-Men Omnibus Vol. 2	Uncanny X-Men #132–153, Annual #4–5; Avengers Annual #10; Marvel Fanfare #1–4; Marvel Treasury Edition #26–27; Marvel Team-Up #100; material from Bizarre Adventures #27; Phoenix: The Untold Story (one-shot)	912	November 2020	978-1302926342
Uncanny X-Men Omnibus Vol. 3	Uncanny X-Men #154–175, Annual #6–7; Marvel Graphic Novel No. 5 - X-Men: God Loves, Man Kills; Wolverine (1982) #1–4; X-Men Special Edition #1; Magik #1–4	1056	February 2016	978-0785199229
Uncanny X-Men Omnibus Vol. 3	Uncanny X-Men #154–175, Annual #6–7; Marvel Graphic Novel No. 5 - X-Men: God Loves, Man Kills; Wolverine (1982) #1–4; X-Men Special Edition #1; Magik #1–4	1056	January 2021	978-1302927028
Uncanny X-Men Omnibus Vol. 4	Uncanny X-Men #176–193, Annual #8, Kitty Pryde and Wolverine #1–6, X-Men/Alpha Flight #1–2, material from Marvel Fanfare (1982) #40	848	March 2021	978-1302927042
Uncanny X-Men Omnibus Vol. 5	Uncanny X-Men #194-209, Annual #9-10, New Mutants Special Edition #1, Nightcrawler (1985) #1-4, Longshot (1985) #1-6, New Mutants Annual #2; material from Marvel Fanfare (1982) #33	1064	June 2023	978-1302948719
X-Men: Mutant Massacre Prelude Omnibus	Uncanny X-Men #194-209; X-Men Annual #9-10; New Mutants Special Edition #1; New Mutants Annual #2; Nightcrawler #1-4; Longshot #1-6; Avengers #263; Fantastic Four #286; X-Factor #1-8 And Annual #1; Iron Man Annual #8; Amazing Spider-Man #282; material from Marvel Fanfare #33, and Classic X-Men #8 And #43.	1496	September 2024	978-1302959739
X-Men: Mutant Massacre Omnibus	Uncanny X-Men #210–219, Annual #11; New Mutants #46; X-Factor #9-17, Annual #2; Thor #373–374, 377–378; Power Pack #27; Daredevil #238; Fantastic Four vs. the X-Men #1-4; X-Men vs. the Avengers #1-4	952	November 2018	978-1302914240
X-Men: Mutant Massacre Omnibus	Uncanny X-Men #210–219, Annual #11; New Mutants #46; X-Factor #9-17, Annual #2; Thor #373–374, 377–378; Power Pack #27; Daredevil #238; Fantastic Four vs. the X-Men #1-4; X-Men vs. the Avengers #1-4	952	December 2021	978-1302931605
X-Men: Fall of the Mutants Omnibus	Uncanny X-Men #220–227; New Mutants #55–61; X-Factor #18–26; Captain America #339; Daredevil #252; Fantastic Four #312; Incredible Hulk (vol. 2) #340; Power Pack #35	824	May 2022	978-1302934118
X-Men: Inferno Prologue Omnibus	Uncanny X-Men #228-238, Annual #12; New Mutants #62-70, Annual #4; X-Factor #27-32, Annual #3; material from Marvel Age Annual #4 and Marvel Fanfare #40	824	September 2021	9781302931360
X-Men: Inferno Omnibus	Uncanny X-Men #239–243; New Mutants #71–73; X-Factor #33–40, material from Annual #4; X-Terminators #1–4; Power Pack (1984) #40, 42–44; Avengers (1963) #298-300; Fantastic Four (1961) #322-324; Amazing Spider-Man (1963) #311-313; Spectacular Spider-Man (1976) #146-148; Web of Spider-Man (1985) #47-48; Daredevil (1964) #262-263, 265; Excalibur (1988) #6-7; Mutant Misadventures of Cloak and Dagger (1988) #4	1240	March 2021	978-1302928544
X-Men by Chris Claremont and Jim Lee Omnibus Vol. 1	Uncanny X-Men #244–269, Annual #13; Classic X-Men #39	720	October 2011	978-0785158226
X-Men by Chris Claremont and Jim Lee Omnibus Vol. 1	Uncanny X-Men #244–269, Annual #13; Classic X-Men #39	720	January 2021	978-1302927127
X-Men: X-Tinction Agenda Omnibus	Uncanny X-Men #270–272, Annual #14-15; New Mutants #95-97; X-Factor #60-62; X-Men: Spotlight on Starjammers #1-2; material from Fantastic Four Annual #23; New Mutants Annual #6-7; X-Factor Annual #5-6; New Warriors Annual #1, Marvel Comics Presents #10-17, #24-32, #41, #43 and #48-49; Marvel Super Heroes (vol. 2) #2 and #6-8; Marvel Holiday Special (1991) #1; and Marvel Tales #262	984	October 2024	978-1302960117
X-Men by Chris Claremont and Jim Lee Omnibus Vol. 2	Uncanny X-Men #273–280; X-Factor #63–70; X-Men (vol. 2) #1–9 and material from 10 to 11; Ghost Rider (vol. 2) #26–27	832	January 2012	978-0785159056
X-Men by Chris Claremont and Jim Lee Omnibus Vol. 2	Uncanny X-Men #273–280; X-Factor #63–70; X-Men (vol. 2) #1–9 and material from 10 to 11; Ghost Rider (vol. 2) #26–27	832	March 2021	978-1302927141
X-Men: Blue & Gold – Mutant Genesis Omnibus	Uncanny X-Men #281-297; Uncanny X-Men Annual #16; X-Men (vol. 2) #1–16; X-Men Annual #1; X-Factor #84–86; X-Force #16-18 Ghost Rider (vol. 2) #26–27; Stryfe's Strike File #1; material from X-Factor Annual #7; X-Force Annual #1; Marvel Comics Presents #89; X-Men: Odd Men Out	1360	September 2025	978-1302965365
X-Men: Fatal Attractions Omnibus	Uncanny X-Men #298-305; Uncanny X-Men Annual #17; X-Men (vol. 2) #25; X-Factor #87–92; X-Force #25 Wolverine #75; Excalibur #71; X-Men Unlimited #1-2	816	March 2025	978-1302963507
X-Men: Age of Apocalypse Omnibus	Uncanny X-Men #320–321, X-Men (vol. 2) #40–41, Cable #20, X-Men Alpha, Amazing X-Men #1–4, Astonishing X-Men (vol. 2) #1–4, Factor X #1–4, Gambit & the X-Ternals #1–4, Generation Next #1–4, Weapon X #1–4, X-Calibre #1–4, X-Man #1–4, X-Men Omega, Age of Apocalypse: The Chosen and X-Men: Age of Apocalypse Ashcan Edition	1072	March 2012	978-0785159827
X-Men: Age of Apocalypse Omnibus	Uncanny X-Men #320–321, X-Men (vol. 2) #40–41, Cable #20, X-Men Alpha, Amazing X-Men #1–4, Astonishing X-Men (vol. 2) #1–4, Factor X #1–4, Gambit & the X-Ternals #1–4, Generation Next #1–4, Weapon X #1–4, X-Calibre #1–4, X-Man #1–4, X-Men Omega, Age of Apocalypse: The Chosen and X-Men: Age of Apocalypse Ashcan Edition	1072	June 2021	978-1302930028
X-Men: Age of Apocalypse Companion Omnibus	X-Men Chronicles #1–2; X-Universe #1–2; Tales from the Age of Apocalypse #1–2; X-Man #53–54, -1, Annual '96; Blink #1–4; Exiles #60–61; X-Men: Age of Apocalypse one-shot and #1–6; What If? (vol. 2) #77, #81; What If? X-Men: Age of Apocalypse; material from Hulk: Broken Worlds #2; X-Men Prime; X-Men: Endangered Species; Exiles: Days of Then & Now; Official Handbook of the Marvel Universe: Age of Apocalypse 2005	992	April 2014	978-0785185147
X-Men: Age of Apocalypse Companion Omnibus	X-Men Chronicles #1–2; X-Universe #1–2; Tales from the Age of Apocalypse #1–2; X-Man #53–54, -1, Annual '96; Blink #1–4; Exiles #60–61; X-Men: Age of Apocalypse one-shot and #1–6; What If? (vol. 2) #77, #81; What If? X-Men: Age of Apocalypse; material from Hulk: Broken Worlds #2; X-Men Prime; X-Men: Endangered Species; Exiles: Days of Then & Now; Official Handbook of the Marvel Universe: Age of Apocalypse 2005	992	July 2021	978-1302930004
X-Men Road To Onslaught Omnibus Vol. 1	Uncanny X-Men #322-328, Annual '95; X-Men Prime #1, X-Men #42-47, X-Men Annual '95, X-Men Unlimited #8-9, Sabretooth Special #1, Wolverine/Gambit: Victims #1-4, Starjammers #1-4	912	December 3, 2024	9781302959500
X-Men Road To Onslaught Omnibus Vol. 2	Uncanny X-Men #329-332, X-Men #48-52, Archangel #1, X-Men/Brood #1-2, X-Men & ClanDestine #1-2, X-Men Unlimited #10, Wolverine #101, Storm #1-4, Further Adventures of Cyclops & Phoenix #1-4, Rise of Apocalypse #1-4, Fantastic Four #19, Xavier Institute Alumni Yearbook #1	984	March 3, 2026	9781302965488
X-Men/Avengers: Onslaught Omnibus	Uncanny X-Men #333-337; X-Force #55, #57-58; Cable #32-36; X-Man #15-19; X-Men (vol. 2) #53-57, Annual '96; X-Men Unlimited #11; Onslaught: X-Men, Onslaught: Marvel Universe, Onslaught: Epilogue; Avengers #401-402; Fantastic Four #415; Incredible Hulk (vol. 2) #444-445; Wolverine (vol. 2) #104-105; X-Factor #125-126; Amazing Spider-Man #415; Green Goblin #12; Spider-Man #72; Iron Man #332; Punisher #11; Thor #502; X-Men: Road to Onslaught #1; material from Excalibur #100 and Fantastic Four #416	1296	July 2015	978-0785192626
X-Men/Avengers: Onslaught Omnibus	Uncanny X-Men #333-337; X-Force #55, #57-58; Cable #32-36; X-Man #15-19; X-Men (vol. 2) #53-57, Annual '96; X-Men Unlimited #11; Onslaught: X-Men, Onslaught: Marvel Universe, Onslaught: Epilogue; Avengers #401-402; Fantastic Four #415; Incredible Hulk (vol. 2) #444-445; Wolverine (vol. 2) #104-105; X-Factor #125-126; Amazing Spider-Man #415; Green Goblin #12; Spider-Man #72; Iron Man #332; Punisher #11; Thor #502; X-Men: Road to Onslaught #1; material from Excalibur #100 and Fantastic Four #416	1296	January 2022	978-1302931612
X-Men: Onslaught Aftermath Omnibus	Uncanny X-Men #338-340, -1, Annual '96-'97, X-men #58-61, -1, X-Men Annual '97, X-Men Unlimited #12-15, Magneto #1-4, XSE #1-4, X-Factor #130, Juggernaut #1, Beast #1-3, Psylocke & Archangel: Crimson Dawn #1-4, Gambit #1-4, material from Marvel Holiday Special #1; Marvel Valentine Special #1	1448	June 24, 2025	9781302964191
X-Men: The Trial Of Gambit	Uncanny X-Men #341-350, -1; X-Men #62-64, -1; Imperial Guard #1-3; Psylocke & Archangel - Crimson Dawn #1-4; Gambit #1-4; Bishop: Xavier Security Enforcer #1-3; Marvel Fanfare (1996) #4-5; Longshot; material from Marvel Valentine's Special (1997)	864	May 19, 2026	978-1302968908
X-Men vs. Apocalypse: The Twelve Omnibus	Uncanny X-Men #371-380 and Annual '99; X-Men (vol. 2) #91-99 and Annual '99 (#94, A-story only); X-Men Unlimited #24-26 (#24, A-story only); Astonishing X-Men (vol. 2) #1-3; Wolverine (vol. 2) #145–149; Gambit #8-9; Cable #71-78; X-Man #59-60; X-51 #8; X-Force #101; X-Men Yearbook 1999	1280	February 2020	978-1302922870
X-Men: Revolution by Chris Claremont Omnibus	Uncanny X-Men #381-389; X-Men (vol. 2) #100-109 and Annual 2000; X-Men Unlimited #27-29; X-Men: Black Sun #1-5; Bishop: The Last X-Man #15-16; Cable #87	904	August 2018	978-1302912147
War of Kings Omnibus	Uncanny X-Men #475-486, X-Men: Emperor Vulcan #1-5, Secret Invasion: War of Kings, X-Men: Kingbreaker #1-4, War of Kings: Darkhawk #1-2, War of Kings: Warriors #1-2, War of Kings #1-6, War of Kings: Ascension #1-4, War of Kings: Savage World of Sakaar, Nova #23-28, Guardians of the Galaxy #13-19, War of Kings: Who Will Rule?, Marvel Spotlight: War of Kings	1304	November 2016	978-1302902254
Avengers vs X-Men Omnibus	Avengers vs. X-Men (2012) #0-12; Point One (2011) #1 (AVX story); AVX: Vs. (2012) #1-6; Avengers vs. X-Men: Infinite (2012) #1, 6, 10; Avengers Academy (2010) #29-33; Secret Avengers (2010) #26-28; Avengers (2010) #25-30; New Avengers (2010) #24-30; X-Men Legacy (2008) #266-270; Wolverine & the X-Men (2011) #9-16, 18; AVX: Consequences (2012) #1-5; Uncanny X-Men (2011) #11-20; A-Babies vs. X-Babies (2012) #1	1680	July 2022	978-1302946777
X-Men: The Hidden Years Omnibus	X-Men: The Hidden Years #1-22, Fantastic Four #102-104, material from X-Men #94 and Amazing Adult Fantasy #14		2023	

== In other media ==
- The title card of The Super Hero Squad Show episode "Hexed, Vexed and Perplexed!" is an homage to X-Men #1.
- During a montage in the 2024 Marvel Cinematic Universe film Deadpool & Wolverine, Wade Wilson encounters a variant of Wolverine nailed to an X, a reference to the cover art of issue #251.
