= Sunspot (character) =

Marvel Comics superhero

- Roberto da Costa as seen in New Avengers (vol. 4) #14 (July 2016). Art by Paco Medina.

Publication information
- Publisher: Marvel Comics
- First appearance: Marvel Graphic Novel #4: The New Mutants (September 1982)
- Created by: Chris Claremont; Bob McLeod

In-story information
- Alter ego: Roberto "Bobby" da Costa
- Species: Human mutant
- Team affiliations: New Mutants; Avengers; A.I.M. Costa International; Fallen Angels; Hellfire Club; New Avengers; X-Corporation; X-Force; X-Men; Young X-Men; U.S.Avengers; S.H.I.E.L.D. Great Ring of Arakko; Brotherhood of Arakko
- Notable aliases: Lord Imperial, Black Rook, Black King, Citizen V
- Abilities: Superhuman strength; Flight; Solar absorption and rechanneling; Heat and light manipulation; Concussive blasts; Plasma emission

Sunspot (Roberto "Bobby" da Costa) is a superhero appearing in American comic books published by Marvel Comics. The character is most commonly associated with X-Men-related groups, the New Mutants and X-Force. Classified as a mutant, Sunspot possesses the ability to absorb and channel solar power into physical strength. His personality is idealistic and impulsive, but despite this he is considered a close friend by many of his teammates. He is initially portrayed as an important member of the X-Men's 1980s-era junior team and its reincarnation X-Force. He later retires as Sunspot and garners a massive fortune that allows him to buy out the Advanced Idea Mechanics organization, which he re-brands to Avengers Idea Mechanics. He then operates under the code name Citizen V.

Adan Canto portrayed the character in X-Men: Days of Future Past. Henry Zaga portrayed the character at a younger age in The New Mutants. Gui Agustini voices the character in X-Men '97.

== Publication history ==
The character of Sunspot was created by writer Chris Claremont and artist Bob McLeod. The hero first appeared in Marvel Graphic Novel #4: The New Mutants (September 1982). Immediately after this appearance, the character became part of the regular cast of The New Mutants, as part of the titular super group.

Sunspot is one of the first Latin American superheroes in mainstream US comics. He is the second Brazilian superhero, after Green Fury (DC).

He was a member of the Avengers in the 2012 relaunch of the Avengers title.

Sunspot is one of the main characters in the U.S.Avengers series.

== Fictional character biography ==
=== Origin ===
Sunspot, or Roberto da Costa, is an Afro-Brazilian, the son of wealthy Afro-Brazilian businessman Emmanuel da Costa and white American archaeologist Nina da Costa. In The New Mutants #7, his father is described as a very driven man, who "grew up [...] a barefoot houseboy", was "by age 20 [...] a millionaire [and] by 30, an economic and political force to be reckoned with." Emmanuel constantly pushes his son to reach for both his physical and intellectual peaks. Thanks to his father's encouragement, Roberto rises to the position of star soccer player at school and is considered by recruiters for the Olympic Games. When Roberto is playing a soccer game with his team, members of the opposing team assault him while hurling racialized insults at Roberto and his father for being black. While taking a brutal beating, his mutant powers manifest, suddenly transforming him into a creature of solid black solar energy. Surprised and terrified, everyone abandons the stadium except for his girlfriend, Juliana.

=== New Mutants ===
Sunspot. Art by Diogenes Neves.

Soon after Roberto discovers his powers, a mutant-hating faction of mercenaries led by Donald Pierce, called the Hellfire Club, kidnap Juliana and use her as bait to lure Roberto into a trap. He engages the kidnappers, but is eventually defeated when the solar power he absorbed runs out. Professor Xavier hears about Pierce's evil plan and sends two young mutants called Karma and Psyche to rescue Roberto. During the following battle, Juliana sacrifices her life for Roberto, jumping in front of a bullet meant for him.

Roberto joins Karma and Psyche in pursuit of Pierce. The three are joined by Wolfsbane, and after the battle by Sam Guthrie (Cannonball), one of Pierce's misguided mutant hirelings, despite initial reservations from the others. Professor Xavier offers to train the five teenagers to control their new mutant powers. They accept the offer and become the founding members of the New Mutants, a group of junior X-Men. Although Professor X's intentions are for them to only be students, over the course of the New Mutants series, they grow into superheroes and travel to space, Asgard, and the Amazon, as well as the past and the future. During Roberto's tenure with the New Mutants, he and Sam become best friends.

=== X-Force ===
When the time travelling antihero Cable takes over the New Mutants and turns them into the paramilitary group X-Force, Sunspot parts ways with the team. During this time, Sunspot is tutored by Gideon of the Externals, an old business partner of Emmanuel da Costa (who has since died), who suspects Sunspot to be a fellow External. Gideon experiments on Sunspot, granting him new powers such as flight and the ability to fire blasts of solar energy. Sunspot becomes lost in the spacetime continuum after interfering with the teleportation powers of Locus.

=== Reignfire ===
The villain Reignfire first appears before Sunspot's disappearance and assumes command of the Mutant Liberation Front. Dani Moonstar, who has infiltrated the MLF, sees Reignfire without his mask and believes him to be Sunspot. During a battle with X-Force, Reignfire removes his mask to reveal himself as Sunspot. Cable 'heals' Sunspot of Reignfire's persona, giving him knowledge of the Askani's language and meditation techniques. (Note: This happened off-panel between X-Force #43 and 44 (1995).) It is later revealed that Reignfire is actually a protoplasmic entity who was injected with Sunspot's blood. Reignfire is defeated when Sunspot removes his powers, reducing him to his original protoplasmic state.

=== Hellfire Club ===
Roberto is approached by Selene of the Hellfire Club, who offers to have him replace his deceased father Emmanuel's seat in the club's Inner Circle, as the seats are inherited. She promises Roberto that she will resurrect Juliana if he joins and he agrees. Selene does bring back the spirit of Juliana, but put it into the body of a comatose girl. Possibly because he feels obliged to fulfill his promise, Roberto decides to stay, becoming Selene's Black Rook. Roberto attempts to contact the resurrected Juliana, but seeing she has no memory of her previous life, he decides to leave her alone.

Roberto next appears in the title X-Treme X-Men as the head of the Los Angeles branch of X-Corporation, along with former New Mutant Magma and former Hellion Empath. Roberto's ties to the Hellfire Club are not severed, as Sebastian Shaw approaches, having taken over the position of Hellfire Club's Lord Imperial and wanting Roberto as his Black King. Shaw claims that he is trying to turn the Club into a force of good, so Roberto accepts, though he keeps his involvement with Shaw a secret.

Soon after, Shaw is injured in battle by Donald Pierce, leaving him incapable of overseeing the Hellfire Club. Roberto takes over as Lord Imperial. At his side is Sage, who leaves the X-Men to make sure Roberto is not corrupted by power.

Later on, Sunspot leaves the Hellfire Club and joins the X-Men in San Francisco, as noted by Sebastian Shaw, who is currently looking for a replacement. Cyclops later asks Sunspot and Danielle Moonstar to help train the Young X-Men and both accept.

=== Reforming the New Mutants ===
After receiving an anonymous tip in Colorado about a young mutant endangering a small town, Dani and Shan are sent to investigate and calm the locals. During their mission, Magik reappears back at the X-Men's base in San Francisco after teleporting into the future after the events of X-Infernus. Upon her return, she informs Sam and Roberto that Shan and Dani are in fatal danger. Sam assembles a team with Sunspot, Magma, and Magik to go find them. Sam and Roberto come across a tied-up and comatose Shan in the back of a bar, while Magik and Magma are tricked into freeing Legion from a box, who apparently has Shan's personality imprisoned inside of him. Roberto and Sam approach Shan's body but when Roberto gets too close he almost gets pulled into Legion's mind. After they leave the bar, they find they are surrounded by police; Roberto and Sam fly away to the jail to find Dani.

When they arrive, Legion is trying to kill Dani. After Roberto and Sam repel him, Legion comes back and Roberto fights him. Cannonball soon joins him and they fend Legion off and regroup. During the fight, Legion takes on Magma, Cannonball, and Roberto, who gets seriously injured when Legion slashes him with a shard of metal.

=== Avengers ===
After the events of Avengers vs. X-Men, Roberto and Sam are offered membership in the Avengers by Captain America and accept. The two become involved in a time travel plot involving the Next Avengers, children of the Avengers from an alternate future, but their memories of this event are wiped by Maria Hill.

During an eight-month time-skip, Roberto engages in a hostile takeover of Advanced Idea Mechanics and gets rid of the villainous upper management, renaming the company Avengers Idea Mechanics. In the storyline Avengers: Standoff!, Roberto orders his Avengers team to free Rick Jones from S.H.I.E.L.D. custody. In response, the American government sends American Kaiju to attack A.I.M. Island. Roberto, having seen this coming, has the island evacuated, and American Kaiju is depowered by Avenger-5, a giant mech suit. As a result, Maria Hill decides to try and shut down A.I.M., at the same time the Maker launches his own attack. However, Roberto also sees these attacks coming and manipulates both sides to stop Maker and his group W.H.I.S.P.E.R. It is also revealed that Roberto has been exposed to Terrigen Mist, which is toxic to mutants; every use of his powers now accelerates his aging. With the Maker captured, Roberto strikes a deal with the U.S. government to round up the remaining rogue branches of A.I.M.

=== U.S.Avengers ===
Following the deal that would get the Avengers Idea Mechanics to merge with the U.S. government as the American Intelligence Mechanics, Sunspot leads the U.S.Avengers as Citizen V. During the Secret Empire storyline, Captain America, whose memory has been altered by Kobik, has a meeting with Roberto and tells him that he is no longer in charge of the U.S.Avengers. Roberto is attacked by one of his scientists, who has allied with Hydra, and is captured. However, he manages to escape with the help of Toni Ho. In the aftermath, Roberto, during a meeting with the team's new congressional liaison in the White House, resigns from his position despite objections from the senator. He meets Izzy Kane, Cannonball's wife, who tells him that Cannonball, who went missing in action during the takeover and was presumed dead, is still alive on another planet.

=== The War of the Realms ===
After the Age of X-Man sends most X-Men members to an alternate reality, Sunspot reappears to assist Mirage and the remaining X-Men in repelling Malekith's invasion of Midgard. In a ploy to allow Magik to teleport the invading horde to Limbo, he breaks a cursed amulet blocking Mirage's powers, and in doing so, is vaporized, joining the fallen Valkyrior in their journey to the afterlife.

Roberto is resurrected on the newly established mutant nation of Krakoa. He invites Cannonball, still living in Shi'ar space, to join him, and talks several of the New Mutants into accompanying him.

== Powers and abilities ==
Sunspot's energized state. New Mutants (vol. 4) #6 Art by Diogenes Neves.

Sunspot is a mutant whose cells have the ability to absorb solar energy and convert it for use as physical strength. He is also able to create thermal updrafts for flight, project heat and light, and create concussive blasts of solar energy. At will, he is able to take on a superhuman form that is entirely nonreflective black, save for his eyes and teeth which turn a solid bright white. The color black optimizes solar absorption, but he absorbs solar power at all times, not only in his "powered up" form. If he has not absorbed sufficient amounts of solar energy in normal form, he will be too weak to "power up". Likewise, when not in direct sunlight, use of his superhuman strength rapidly exhausts the stores of energy within his body.

In his solar form, Sunspot has a corona effect, an aura that has been depicted in multiple ways, though two predominant conventions exist for its portrayal: the air close to him manifests black globes of various sizes, reminiscent of Kirby dots, or his aura is a unified field glowing bright yellow or white. Although Sunspot can absorb energy from stars and reflected solar energy from the Moon, the amounts that reach him on Earth are too minuscule to add significantly to his power. In other regions, such as Asgard, his power is significantly enhanced, allowing him - with much effort - to lift Volstagg off the ground for a few seconds before suffering a backache.

Originally, Sunspot's superhuman power was limited solely to superhuman strength and enhanced durability, and only in his solar form. Unlike many superhumanly strong heroes, Sunspot's physical resistance to impact only increased somewhat when he employed his superhuman strength, and he was not bulletproof. Sunspot's powers have radically changed and grown since his introduction; he can now withstand the force of a speeding eighteen-wheeler traveling at speeds of 100 mph, and survive an A.I.M explosive charge attached to his side.

Sunspot maintained his original powers for roughly the first ten years of his appearances, remaining a super strong but vulnerable individual throughout the entire New Mutants series. During the mid-1990s in X-Force his powers begin to change, under writer Fabian Nicieza. Nicieza had the supervillain Gideon capture Roberto and subject him to experimentation where the limits of his power absorption are tested by feeding him immense amounts of solar power. Sunspot is rescued by X-Force, but the overload permanently alters his powers so he is able to release concussive blasts of solar energy, with considerable heat and light projection; this experimentation also makes him immune to all types of heat and fire. He can also absorb other forms of energy; such as heat, light or radiation. Sunspot has some capacity to manipulate light-based energy effects, but it remains a largely unexplored aspect of his mutant power.

In X-Force #28, Sunspot uses the concussive solar blasts as a means of propulsion, flying by blasting in the opposite direction of where he wants to go – initially he leaves a slight trail behind him, but in later years, he learns to use the propulsion more subtly – appearing to hover in place with no blast wake at all other than his usual "powered up" corona effect. His capacity to fly has similarly been enhanced as he is able to breach planetary orbit and reach Saturn's belt with relative ease.

Sunspot has the rituals and ideas of the Askani inside his head, due to telepathic contact with Cable. He is strongly influenced by this for a while, but the memories seem to fade.

His non-superhuman abilities include business administration; he owns and runs a multibillion-dollar international conglomerate. He is an Olympic-class athlete as the result of being trained in combat by the X-Men and Cable. He is fluent in many languages and has other minor talents such as piloting aircraft. He was trained in swordsmanship by the Gladiators, and is also an excellent soccer player.

== Reception ==
- In 2014, Entertainment Weekly ranked Sunspot 32nd in their "Let's rank every X-Man ever" list.
- In 2018, CBR.com ranked Sunspot 13th in their "Age Of Apocalypse: The 30 Strongest Characters In Marvel's Coolest Alternate World" list.
- In 2018, CBR.com ranked Sunspot 12th in their "X-Force: 20 Powerful Members" list.

== Other versions ==
Many alternate universe versions of Sunspot have appeared throughout the character's publication history.

=== Age of Apocalypse ===
In Age of Apocalypse, Sunspot is a member of the X-Ternals, a group of thieves who take money from Apocalypse and give it to the poor. Sunspot dies after absorbing too much energy in an attempt to help his teammates escape.

=== Days of Future Now ===
In Days of Future Now, Sunspot is the leader of the Gene Nation.

=== Mutant X ===
In Mutant X, Sunspot is a member of the Marauders.

=== Ultimate Marvel ===
In the Ultimate Marvel universe, Sunspot is a member of Emma Frost's Academy of Tomorrow.

=== Ultimate Universe ===
In the Ultimate Universe imprint, Roberto da Costa is exploited by his father Emmanuel for his powers until Emma Frost allows him to kill Emmanuel.

== In other media ==
=== Television ===
- Sunspot appears in X-Men: Evolution, voiced by Michael Coleman. This version is a member of the New Mutants.
- Sunspot appears in X-Men '97, voiced by Gui Agustini. This version is initially a new member of the X-Men who develops a bond with Jubilee. He temporarily defects to join Magneto, and joins Cable's X-Force.

=== Film ===
Adan Canto as Sunspot as he appears in X-Men: Days of Future Past.

- Sunspot was originally meant to appear in X-Men: First Class, but was written out due to time and budget issues.
- Sunspot appears in X-Men: Days of Future Past, portrayed by Adan Canto. This version is a member of the X-Men from a post-apocalyptic Sentinel-dominated future in the year 2023.
- Sunspot appears in The New Mutants, portrayed by Henry Zaga. After accidentally burning his girlfriend Mariella, he develops a fear of doing the same to others before overcoming it during the fight with the Demon Bear and developing a romantic interest in Illyana Rasputin.

=== Video games ===
- Sunspot appears as a playable character in Marvel Contest of Champions.
- Sunspot appears in Marvel Snap.
