= The New Mutants =

The New Mutants may refer to:

- New Mutants, a superhero team of mutants from Marvel Comics
- The New Mutants (graphic novel), a 1982 graphic novel by Marvel Comics
- The New Mutants (comic book), an ongoing superhero title from Marvel that debuted in 1983, and a continuation of the graphic novel of the same name
- The New Mutants (film), a 2020 American superhero movie based on the Marvel Comics team of the same name
