= Cannonball (Marvel Comics) =

Marvel Comics superhero

- Samuel Guthrie / Cannonball as seen on the textless variant cover of Uncanny X-Men vol. 5 #5 (December 2018). Art by Shane Davis.

Publication information
- Publisher: Marvel Comics
- First appearance: Marvel Graphic Novel #4: The New Mutants (September 1982)
- Created by: Chris Claremont (writer); Bob McLeod (artist)

In-story information
- Alter ego: Samuel Zachary "Sam" Guthrie
- Species: Human mutant
- Place of origin: Cumberland, Kentucky
- Team affiliations: New Mutants; X-Force; Avengers; X-Corporation; U.S.Avengers; X-Men; Jean Grey School; X-Treme X-Men; Hellfire Club; Hellions; XSE
- Notable aliases: Starshine
- Abilities: Creation of a protective "blast field" while in flight; Jet propulsion

Cannonball (Samuel Zachary "Sam" Guthrie) is a superhero appearing in American comic books published by Marvel Comics. Created by writer Chris Claremont and artist Bob McLeod, the character first appeared in Marvel Graphic Novel #4 (September 1982). Guthrie belongs to the subspecies of humans called mutants, who are born with superhuman abilities. He possesses the power to fly at jet speeds while encased in an impenetrable force field.

The eldest of a large Kentucky coal mining family, Samuel Guthrie is a founding member of the X-Men's junior team, the New Mutants. Several of his siblings are also mutants who have joined X-Men-related teams. Guthrie served as X-Force's second-in-command and field leader, eventually joining the X-Men as the first member of a secondary team to "graduate" to the main team. He was also a member of the Avengers.

Since his original introduction in comics, the character has been featured in various other Marvel-licensed products, including video games, animated television series, and merchandise. Charlie Heaton portrayed Sam Guthrie in the 2020 film The New Mutants.

== Publication history ==
Samuel Guthrie debuted as a member of the New Mutants in Marvel Graphic Novel #4 (September 1982), created by Chris Claremont and artist Bob McLeod. McLeod later commented, "I always liked Cannonball the best [of the New Mutants]. I tried to give all the mutants distinct body types and characteristics, and with his big ears and lanky frame, he was just the most fun to draw."

After a guest appearance in The Uncanny X-Men # 167, the character appeared regularly in the title The New Mutants from its first issue to its hundredth issue (1983–1991), and continued to appear in its replacement title X-Force (1991). In X-Force # 44 (1995), Cannonball leaves X-Force to join the X-Men, appearing regularly in X-Men #48–89 and The Uncanny X-Men #323–355 (1995–1998). He rejoins his friends in X-Force while on an extended road trip in X-Force #86 (1998), and stays with the team through issue # 117 (2001), after which the title changes drastically, taken over by the team later to be known as X-Statix.

Cannonball next appears as a member of the X-Corporation in New X-Men #128, 130, 131 and 140 (2002–2003), and then rejoins the X-Men in a splinter team led by Storm in X-Treme X-Men #24–46 (2003–2004). After the cancellation of X-Treme X-Men, Cannonball appears regularly with the X-Men in the mid to late 2000s, including The Uncanny X-Men #444–447 (2004) and #466–474 (2006), X-Men #188–204 (2006–2007), Young X-Men #1–6 (2008) and Secret Invasion: X-Men #1–4 (2009). He and Sunspot also appear in Astonishing Tales #1–6 (2009).

In 2009, New Mutants was relaunched in its third volume, penned by Zeb Wells, though in this incarnation they were a strike team of X-Men with a defined roster, including Mirage, Karma, Sunspot, Magma, Magik, Cypher, and Warlock. Cannonball appears as a regular from issue #1 through #25 (2009–2011). The New Mutants were a major fixture in the Second Coming event, in which Cannonball and his team appear in The Uncanny X-Men #523–524, X-Force #36 and X-Men: Legacy #234–235 (2010).

Cannonball would be featured during Second Coming in the X-Men: Hellbound miniseries #1–3 (2010), leading the team of Pixie, Gambit, Anole, Dazzler, Trance and Northstar to Limbo to rescue Magik.

In the Age of X event, Cannonball suffered mental trauma as the field leader of a bastion under constant siege, causing him to leave the New Mutants in X-Regenesis #1 (2011) and New Mutants #25 vol. 3 (2011). He would leave the X-Men's base on Utopia to join Wolverine's faction at the Jean Grey School for Higher Learning in New York, joining Rogue's team in X-Men: Legacy #260.1-#267 (2012).

Cannonball and Sunspot were asked by Captain America to join the Avengers, bridging the gap between humans and mutants in the aftermath of the Avengers vs. X-Men event. He appears in Avengers vol. 5 #1–23 (2013) and #38–44 (2015), Avengers World #1–18 (2014–2015), U.S. Avengers #1–12 (2017), and Avengers #675–690 (2018) during the No Surrender event.

He later rejoined the X-Men in The Uncanny X-Men vol. 5 #1 (2018) and remains in regular publication in that title.

Cannonball appeared in the New Mutants: War Children one-shot (2019).

== Fictional character biography ==
=== Origin ===
Samuel Guthrie was born in Cumberland, Kentucky. As a child, he tried to support his family by working in the coal mine where his father had worked before his death. While attempting to rescue a fellow worker, Mr. Lewis, from a collapsing mine shaft, Sam's mutant ability unintentionally manifested, saving both of them. Subsequently, Guthrie was recruited by Donald Pierce of the Hellfire Club to attack the New Mutants. When ordered to kill the defeated New Mutants, Guthrie defied Pierce and was later invited by Charles Xavier to join the New Mutants as Cannonball.

=== New Mutants ===
As a member of the New Mutants, Cannonball forms a close friendship with his teammate Sunspot and develops a brotherly affection for Rahne Sinclair, unaware for some time that she harbors romantic feelings for him. Cannonball, alongside Danielle Moonstar, serves as co-leader of the New Mutants, leading the team through various adventures across time and space. He later enters a romantic relationship with Lila Cheney.

Wolfsbane, Warlock, Rictor, and Boom Boom are kidnapped from the grounds of the X-Mansion by Genoshan forces under Cameron Hodge. Warlock is killed by Hodge in an attempt to steal his powers. Cannonball joins the X-Men in a rescue mission that leads to the overthrow of Genosha's government, while Wolfsbane remains behind to assist the victims of Genosha's regime.

=== X-Force ===
Cannonball and the New Mutants leave the supervision of the X-Men. They join forces with Cable to form the team X-Force, with Cannonball appointed as the team's second-in-command and field leader. During a confrontation with the Brotherhood of Mutants, Cannonball is impaled and killed, but heals within minutes. Cable believes Cannonball to be an External, a rare type of mutant who is virtually immortal. Other Externals, including Saul and Gideon, come to believe that Cannonball is one of them.

=== X-Men ===
Cover to X-Treme X-Men #24. Art by Salvador Larroca.

Cannonball later rejoins the X-Men, initially with great enthusiasm but soon begins to question his abilities. He confronts these doubts during a battle against Gladiator, fighting Gladiator to a standstill.

Cannonball's relationship with Tabitha becomes strained, leading her to seek "support" from Sunspot. Subsequently, Cannonball leaves the X-Men to care for his ailing mother. During his time with the X-Men, he infiltrates the presidential campaign of anti-mutant candidate Graydon Creed under the alias "Samson Guthry." Despite the obviousness of the alias, Cannonball remains undetected until Creed is assassinated on the eve of the election.

Cannonball rejoins X-Force, which has relocated to San Francisco, and becomes the team leader following Siryn's injury. Although Cable has departed, the team finds a new mentor in Pete Wisdom, who introduces them to espionage. Cannonball and Tabitha reconcile during this period. After Wisdom's alleged death, Cannonball resumes leadership of the team and strives to continue Wisdom's mission. Eventually, Cannonball and the other X-Force members are forced to fake their own deaths.

=== Back to basics ===
Storm invites Cannonball to join her team, the X-Treme X-Men, which operates independently of Professor X's leadership. The team eventually reverts to the central X-Men roster. After sustaining injuries on a mission, Cannonball opts for a period of respite and retreats to his farm, which he purchased with his X-Corporation earnings. While on the farm, he reunites with Cable and the reformed X-Force to combat the threat posed by Skornn.

Cannonball rejoins the active roster of the X-Men, co-led by Nightcrawler and Bishop, and takes on a role overseeing the younger students at the X-Mansion. He also serves as a member of the X-Treme Sanctions Executive (XSE), participating in efforts such as aiding the 198 and battling the Shi'ar Death Commandos. Cannonball experiences personal tragedy with the death of his brother Jay, who is killed by William Stryker.

=== Rogue's team ===
Cannonball serves on Rogue's team of X-Men. Following a battle with the Hecatomb and Rogue's severe mental injury, the team retreats to Rogue's childhood home for rest. They are soon attacked by the Marauders, who are seeking Destiny's Diaries. During the attack, Emma Frost, who had been attempting to assist Rogue, is incapacitated by a neurotoxin. She uploads what she has gathered from the Marauders' psi-shielding into Cannonball's mind and takes partial control of his body. While aboard the Blackbird, the team is engaged midair by Sunfire, who severely damages the jet. Cannonball escapes and confronts Shiro, who reveals that he killed Cable.

Cannonball and Iceman work to recover the Destiny Diaries, which are concealed in a dilapidated brewery. During their mission, they are attacked by the Marauders, and Cannonball sustains serious injuries. Dr. Henry McCoy assesses his condition, noting that Cannonball's brain scan shows sluggish and irregular activity. Despite this, Cannonball rapidly recovers and participates in the final battle against the Marauders.

=== Manifest Destiny ===
After Cyclops disbands the X-Men, Cannonball returns home. He is soon contacted by Cyclops, who informs him that the X-Men are reforming in San Francisco. Cannonball agrees to join the new team and arrives in the city just as Magneto is attacking with a group of antique Sentinels. Cannonball manages to charge into Magneto, disabling his artificial magnetism suit and giving the X-Men a strategic advantage in the battle, though Magneto ultimately escapes. Later, Cannonball is seen at a bar with Karma and Moonstar, expressing his disillusionment with the notion of changing the world. Instead, he finds purpose in preventing others from experiencing the loss he endured with Jay's death. He is subsequently called upon to assist with dealing with Empath.

=== Reforming the New Mutants ===
After receiving an anonymous tip about a young mutant threatening a small town in Colorado, Moonstar and Karma are sent to investigate and reassure the locals. Meanwhile, Magik reappears at the X-Men's base in San Francisco after having teleported into the future following the events of "X-Infernus." She warns Cannonball and Sunspot that Moonstar and Karma are in grave danger and that their situation could lead to their deaths. Cannonball, Sunspot, Magma, and Magik set out to locate them. They eventually find Karma unconscious and are deceived into freeing Legion. Magik and Magma arrive in time to stop Legion and free Moonstar. After Legion is captured, Cannonball tries to apologize, but Moonstar limps away, ignoring him. Cannonball later confesses to Cyclops that he feels he has failed, but Cyclops reassures him that keeping everyone alive is what truly matters.

In the aftermath of Utopia, Scott reveals to Moonstar that Cannonball did not select her for his team, which leaves her deeply upset and angry. This revelation leads to a confrontation between Moonstar and Cannonball, but they eventually reach an understanding, and Cannonball allows Moonstar to join the team. Later, during a discussion about Sam's past romantic relationships, particularly with Lila Cheney, Cannonball and Moonstar share a kiss, which is interrupted by the rest of the team.

=== Regenesis ===
Wolverine hires Cannonball to work at his new school, where he teaches a course on flying. For students without natural flying abilities, jetpacks are provided. During this period, Cannonball makes a point of checking in on his sister Paige (Husk), who works full-time at the school and expresses concern about her mental well-being.

As part of the Marvel NOW! event, Cannonball becomes a member of the Avengers alongside Sunspot. Eight months into the future, he is depicted living on an alien planet within the Shi'ar empire with Izzy Kane and their child.

=== U.S.Avengers ===
Cannonball joins the U.S.Avengers, and their inaugural mission involves confronting the Secret Empire's floating volcanic island base. They are subsequently visited by a future version of Danielle Cage as Captain America, who warns them that her nemesis, the Golden Skull, has traveled to their timeline to steal the world's wealth. The U.S.Avengers defeat and capture the Golden Skull, after which Moonstarelle returns him to her own timeline.

During the Secret Empire storyline, Cannonball decides to leave the U.S.Avengers to spend time with his wife and son. However, upon returning to Earth, he encounters the Alpha Flight Space Program, the Guardians of the Galaxy, and the Ultimates in their battle against the Chitauri. Cannonball joins the fight but is presumed dead when a Chitauri dragon consumes Quasar and subsequently explodes. He is later discovered by an alien and sold at auction on an alien planet to a mysterious human named Howard Mason, who transports him to a small Earth-like town on the alien planet. Cannonball's wife eventually informs Sunspot that Cannonball is alive on another planet.

While traveling through space, Cannonball is introduced to the townspeople by Ritchie Redwood, the ruler of the planet. Upon realizing the troublesome nature of the inhabitants, Cannonball attempts to escape but is captured and imprisoned. In the dungeon, he encounters other prisoners, including a teenager named Bugface. Cannonball orchestrates a prison break, and they set out to overthrow Ritchie. During the ensuing battle, Smasher and the U.S. Avengers arrive to provide assistance. After Ritchie and his army are imprisoned, the heroes return home.

== Powers and abilities ==
Samuel Guthrie possesses the ability to bodily generate thermo-chemical energy and release it from his skin. This energy is used as thrust to cause his body to be propelled through the air like a rocket, at great heights and speeds with considerable maneuverability. He can control his speed and direction through sheer act of will. At first, he could only release this energy from his feet and legs, but he later became able to fire it from almost any part of his body, to a wide variety of effects. This energy also manifests as an impenetrable and virtually indestructible "blast field" that protects him from bodily harm. Guthrie can use this blast-field for the following effects: to function as a personal shield or extending it to encompass others, to shape the field around another person to imprison them, or to absorb outside kinetic impact into his own energy supply, enabling him to increase the bludgeoning power of his blows or to create explosive shock waves upon impact. His power levels have varied over the years; at his peak, he was able to absorb and redirect the force of one of Gladiator's punches.

Furthermore, Guthrie may also be a member of the immortal mutant group the Externals, due to his apparent ability to return to life after death.

== Reception ==
Comic Book Resources noted that Samuel Guthrie gained significant popularity in the 1980s as he appeared alongside Magik and Moonstar in New Mutants. George Marston of Newsarama named Guthrie one of the best members of the X-Men. Matthew Monagle of ScreenCrush called Guthrie a fan favorite. Eric Diaz of Nerdist said that although Guthrie was initially portrayed with a "aw, shucks" Southern stereotype, he eventually transcended this image to become one of the X-Men universe's most popular characters, describing him as the "big lug with a heart of gold" and highlighting that he serves as the emotional core of the team.

== Other versions ==
Various alternate universe versions of Sam Guthrie / Cannonball have appeared throughout the character's publication history.

=== Age of Apocalypse ===
An alternate version of Sam Guthrie appears in the "Age of Apocalypse" storyline. This version joined Mister Sinister's Elite Mutant Force after most of his family was killed, with he and his siblings Paige, Elisabeth, and Joshua being spared due to being mutants. With his siblings, Guthrie intends to fulfill Paige's "revenge" against the X-Men for Colossus' abandonment of her in the Core. He, along with his siblings, are killed in battle with the X-Men.

=== Days of Future Past ===
An alternate version of Sam Guthrie appears in the storyline "Days of Future Past". During a fight with Warlock's father Magus, Magik accidentally ends up teleporting her whole team, split up, into two alternative future timelines. In one of them, where the Sentinels have destroyed most of Earth's mutants, Guthrie works with Danielle Moonstar and Lila Cheney to take mutants to safety.

=== Earth-80521 ===
In a potential future depicted in Cable, Sam Guthrie is among the few remaining mutants. When a time-traveling Cable arrives with the baby Hope Summers, Guthrie allows Cable to escape with the child, opting to stay and distract Bishop. Bishop pleads with Guthrie not to fight, but Guthrie persists, having developed a decades-long grudge against Bishop. After a long fight, Bishop is forced to kill Guthrie.

=== Mutant X ===
In Mutant X, Guthrie is a member of the Marauders, a murderous band of thieves.

=== The Last Avengers Story ===
In The Last Avengers Story, Guthrie version is a member of the Avengers before being killed by Kang the Conqueror.

=== Ultimate Marvel ===
In the Ultimate Marvel universe. Guthrie is a member of Emma Frost's Academy of Tomorrow, a pacifistic alternative to the X-Men.

=== Ultimate Universe ===
In the Ultimate Universe, Guthrie is known as Ballistic and is a member of the Defenders until he is killed by Wingspan.

=== What If ===
In What If the X-Men stayed in Asgard?, Guthrie stays in Asgard and becomes the king of the dwarves after Eitri's death.

== In other media ==
=== Television ===
Cannonball as he appears in X-Men: The Animated Series.

- Cannonball appears in the X-Men: The Animated Series episode "Hidden Agenda", voiced by Adrian Egan.
- Cannonball appears in X-Men: Evolution, voiced by Bill Switzer. This version is a member of the X-Men's junior team, the New Mutants.

=== Film ===
Sam Guthrie appears in The New Mutants, portrayed by Charlie Heaton. This version accidentally killed his father alongside a group of his fellow miners. He works to get his propulsion perfected when in the custody of Dr. Cecilia Reyes.

=== Video games ===
- Cannonball appears in the PSP version of X-Men Legends II: Rise of Apocalypse.
- Cannonball appears as an unlockable character in Marvel: Avengers Alliance.
- Cannonball appears as a playable card in Marvel Snap.

=== Miscellaneous ===
- Cannonball appears in the novelization of X-Men: The Last Stand as a student of the Xavier Institute.
- In 2021, Hasbro released an action figure of Cannonball as part of the Marvel Legends action figure line.
- In 2024, Cannonball was added to the role-playing game Marvel Multiverse Role-Playing Game.
