= Hrimhari =

- Hrimhari as depicted in War of the Realms: Uncanny X-Men #3 (June 2019). Art by Pere Pérez (penciller/inker) and Rachelle Rosenberg (colorist).

Publication information
- Publisher: Marvel Comics
- First appearance: The New Mutants Special Edition #1 (December 1985)
- Created by: Chris Claremont (writer); Art Adams (artist)

In-story information
- Alter ego: Hrimhari
- Species: Asgardian
- Place of origin: Asgard
- Team affiliations: Asgard; X-Force; New Mutants; Xavier Institute
- Abilities: Wolf transformation

Hrimhari is a fictional character appearing in American comic books published by Marvel Comics. He was first introduced in The New Mutants Special Edition #1 (December 1985), and was created by Chris Claremont and Art Adams.

Hrimhari is a descendant of Fenris Wolf, a wolf-like creature from Norse mythology, and the prince of Asgard's wolves. As a descendant of Fenris, he is able to partially or fully transform into a wolf. Hrimhari encounters the New Mutants while they are in Asgard and quickly bonds with Wolfsbane, a member of the group who possesses similar abilities to his own. Hrimhari sacrificed himself to revive Elixir from a comatose state, allowing him to augment Wolfsbane to survive their birth of her and Hrimhari's child Tier. Tier was later killed by Strong Guy, reuniting with Hrimhari in the underworld.

== Fictional character biography ==
A descendant of Fenris Wolf, Hrimhari is the prince of the wolves of Asgard. He presides over all wolves in Asgard, but retains a humble and gentle demeanor not normally associated with royalty. He originally had the ability to change his form from that of a gray wolf to a shape resembling a wolf-human hybrid. He is highly respected by the people of Asgard, and is said to be a true friend of Hogun. However, the giants of Asgard are mortal enemies of the wolf people and hunt them down at every opportunity.

=== Captured by Loki ===
When the New Mutants are magically taken to Asgard, Wolfsbane (Rahne Sinclair) meets Hrimhari in the woods while being chased by giants. Immediately enchanted by her, Hrimhari saves Rahne and the two become almost inseparable. Rahne has similar feelings, but does not know how to deal with them due to her strict upbringing. The two are separated when the New Mutants return to Earth.

=== Fighting Hela ===
Years later, the death goddess Hela attempts to take over Asgard. Part of her plan to conquer Asgard and kill a then-helpless Odin, using wolves as her scouts and spies. Hrimhari battles Hela's armies for his people's freedom, but he is eventually captured. The New Mutants discover Hela's plan through the link Danielle Moonstar has with the Valkyrior and rescue Hrimhari. Hrimhari travels to get help from Tiwaz, who in turn sends him to free the Warriors Three from the Hive Trolls. Hrimhari recruits the troll queen Ula, who is initially reluctant but agrees to work with him after being convinced that Hela is the true enemy.

=== Back with Wolfsbane ===
Hrimhari reunites with Wolfsbane, with the two battling and killing Frost Giants together. Wolfsbane becomes pregnant with a son, Tier, but is told that she will not survive childbirth due to Tier's immense power. Hrimhari sacrifices his soul to heal Elixir, who augments Wolfsbane's body so she can survive childbirth. As he grows up, Tier is adopted by Werewolf by Night. He is later killed by Strong Guy during a battle with the Lords of Hell, who seek to harness his magic.

Hrimhari returns in The War of the Realms storyline, where he and Tier make a deal with the Enchantress that allows them to leave the underworld, but prevents them from interfering in the Dark Council's schemes. The deal is broken when Wolfsbane attacks Sabretooth, forcing Hrimhari and Tier to return to Hel.
