= The New Mutants (film) =

2020 film by Josh Boone

- Theatrical release poster
- Directed by: Josh Boone
- Written by: Josh Boone; Knate Lee
- Based on: New Mutants by: Chris Claremont; Bob McLeod
- Produced by: Simon Kinberg; Lauren Shuler Donner; Karen Rosenfelt
- Starring: Maisie Williams; Anya Taylor-Joy; Charlie Heaton; Alice Braga
- Cinematography: Peter Deming
- Edited by: Robb Sullivan; Matthew Rundell; Andrew Buckland
- Music by: Mark Snow
- Production companies: Marvel Entertainment; Kinberg Genre; Sunswept Entertainment
- Distributed by: 20th Century Studios
- Release date: August 28, 2020 (United States)
- Running time: 94 minutes
- Country: United States
- Language: English
- Budget: $67–80 million
- Box office: $49.2 million

The New Mutants is a 2020 American superhero film based on the Marvel Comics superhero team the New Mutants. It is a spin-off film in the X-Men film series and the thirteenth installment overall. The film was directed by Josh Boone from a screenplay he wrote with Knate Lee, and stars Maisie Williams, Anya Taylor-Joy, Charlie Heaton, and Alice Braga. In the film, a group of young mutants held in a secret facility fight to save themselves.

Boone and Lee first began work on the film after Boone completed The Fault in Our Stars (2014). The pair pitched a potential film trilogy to X-Men producer Simon Kinberg, and in May 2015 they were officially signed on to the project. Taylor-Joy and Williams were rumored to be cast in March 2016 and were confirmed over a year later when the rest of the cast filled out. Filming took place in Boston, Massachusetts, from July to September 2017, primarily at Medfield State Hospital, with the release date of April 13, 2018 in mind. The film was then delayed while reshoots were planned to be done and Disney began the process of acquiring production company 20th Century Fox. After the acquisition was completed, Boone returned to work on the film, and it was completed without reshoots in March 2020.

The New Mutants was theatrically released in the United States on August 28, 2020, by 20th Century Studios. The film received mixed reviews from critics and underperformed in the box-office, grossing $49.2 million worldwide against a production budget of $67–80 million, becoming the lowest-grossing film in the X-Men film series overall.

== Plot ==
Danielle "Dani" Moonstar, a young Cheyenne Native American, is hidden in a tree by her father as her entire reservation is devastated by a tornado, leaving her the only survivor. After falling unconscious, Dani awakens in an oddly empty hospital run by Dr. Cecilia Reyes, who comforts Dani, explaining that she is not an ordinary human being but, rather, has unique mutant DNA, and she advises her to remain in the hospital until she learns the effects and how to control them.

Dani is introduced to four other teenagers, Samuel "Sam" Guthrie, Illyana Rasputin, Roberto "Bobby" da Costa, and Rahne Sinclair, who also possess superhuman abilities due to their DNA mutations. Reyes, who can manipulate plasma-energy barriers, has brought them to the hospital, after they have each either experienced or accidentally caused a tragedy. Sam can generate energy around his body to fly at jet speed and render himself temporarily nigh-invulnerable. After his powers manifested, he accidentally collapsed a coal mine, killing his father and coworkers in the process. Roberto, who can emit and manipulate furnace-like heat, accidentally burned his girlfriend to death while they were swimming. Rahne can transform into a wolf or wolf-human hybrid with enhanced senses. She escaped her devoutly Catholic village after killing the priest who called her a witch. Illyana has interdimensional sorcery powers and has a traumatic childhood history of sexual abuse.

During her first day, where Illyana implies there is nothing stopping her, Dani attempts to escape, but is stopped by a force field created by Reyes surrounding the entire hospital grounds. Further frustrated from Illyana's harshness and still grieving the loss of her family, Dani plans to kill herself but is prevented by Rahne. The two become friends and later date, but Illyana antagonizes Dani, who discovers that Illyana has a hand puppet of a purple dragon called Lockheed. The five teenagers all believe they are being trained to join the X-Men, hence the strict supervision. Reyes warns them that they are considered dangerous and should not leave until they have mastered their abilities. The group experiences visions of their past tragedies, one of which results in Rahne getting branded in the shower by the same priest whom she had previously murdered. During this, Dani undergoes a neural test, inadvertently discovering Reyes's true intentions and seeing the future. Both Illyana and Reyes deduce that the visions are the result of Dani's powers manifesting themselves: the ability physically manifest the greatest fears and darkest secrets from a person's mind into reality as tangible illusions. Reyes consults her employers, the Essex Corporation, who instruct her to collect Dani's DNA and then liquidate her.

As Reyes straps her to a gurney, Dani's panic causes her powers to go haywire. Illyana and Sam are attacked by physical manifestations of Illyana's childhood abusers – monstrous humanoid creatures called the "Smiling Men" – while Roberto, who was attacked by a Smiling Man, tries in vain to break through the hospital's outer barrier, which has shrunken. Rahne, who had been suspicious of Reyes's next "procedure", arrives in half-wolf form and attacks Reyes, forcing her to flee. The five regroup in Reyes's office and realize that she was training them to become killers and that, to escape, they must kill her to deprive the barrier of its power source. They find and confront Reyes, who warns them that Dani is too powerful and will destroy them all due to the lack of control over her power.

Reyes restricts them all with barriers and tries again to kill Dani by asphyxiating her inside a barrier, which unleashes the Demon Bear, a manifestation of Dani's own fears and the true cause of her reservation's destruction. Reyes is devoured and Dani is rendered unconscious. Rahne tries to reach Dani's subconscious and urges her to wake up, while Illyana uses her powers to travel to her "special place", an alternate dimension, where she retrieves a glowing sword (Soulsword), armor, and a small, physical manifestation of Lockheed to battle the Demon Bear. Dani is visited by her father's spirit, who encourages her to face her fear. She awakens and then confronts the Demon Bear, calming and dissipating it. As day breaks, the group leaves the now-unshielded facility to find the nearest town.

== Cast ==
- Maisie Williams as Rahne Grace Sinclair / Wolfsbane:
  A Scottish mutant who can turn into a wolf and is struggling to reconcile this with her religious beliefs. Williams was persuaded to join the film after discussing the character's religious background with director Josh Boone, who identified with the comic book character due to his own strict religious upbringing.
- Anya Taylor-Joy as Illyana Nikolaievna Rasputina / Magik:
  A Russian mutant with sorcery powers, she can manifest the Soulsword and use teleportation discs to travel. Illyana is the enigmatic sister of Colossus, a member of the X-Men seen in previous films in the series. She has a purple dragon companion from another dimension, named Lockheed. Colbi Gannett portrays Illyana as a child.
- Charlie Heaton as Samuel Zachary "Sam" Guthrie / Cannonball: An American mutant from the state of Kentucky who can propel himself into the air, and is invulnerable while doing so.
- Alice Braga as Dr. Cecilia Reyes: A strict mentor to the group and a medical doctor who can generate protective fields.
- Blu Hunt as Danielle "Dani" Moonstar / Mirage:
  A Native American mutant who can create illusions based on the fears and desires of other people. She can possibly see the future as well. The film includes a love story between Rahne and Dani, which Williams felt was a natural extension of the comic book characters having a telepathic connection. Boone described this as "the spine and focus" of the film's "character-driven stuff".
- Henry Zaga as Roberto "Bobby" da Costa / Sunspot: A Brazilian mutant who can manipulate solar energy.
- Adam Beach as William Lonestar: Dani's father of Cheyenne descent.
- Thomas Kee as Thomas Guthrie, Sam's father.
- Happy Anderson as Reverend Craig, a priest from Rahne's village.
- Dustin Ceithamer (physical portrayal) and Marilyn Manson (voice) as the Smiling Men, Illyana's abusers.

Additionally, Dafne Keen appears as Laura / X-23 through archival footage from Logan (2017).

== Production ==
=== Development ===
In 2009, X-Men film series producer Lauren Shuler Donner revealed to /Film her interest in a film adaptation of the New Mutants comics but that it had yet to be pitched to 20th Century Fox. After completing work on The Fault in Our Stars (2014) for 20th Century Fox, director Josh Boone created a comic book with his childhood best friend Knate Lee using panels from Chris Claremont and Bill Sienkiewicz's New Mutants comics to illustrate what a potential film trilogy adapting those comics would be like. The pair had been fans of the characters growing up, with Boone calling the stories "really dark, interesting, and different from the typical X-Men stories that we had read". Boone and Lee took the comic to Simon Kinberg, one of the producers of the X-Men film series, who "really liked it". In May 2015, Fox finalized a deal to have Boone direct The New Mutants, from a script by himself and Lee, with Kinberg and Donner producing. The film was initially intended to expand the universe of the X-Men franchise and take place three years after X-Men: Apocalypse (2016). While working on the first draft of the script, Boone sent it and his ideas for the film to Sienkiewicz, who thought Boone "had it figured out" and was not just copying the comics.

Updating the status of the film in March 2016, Kinberg said that Boone and Lee were working on the script, and that, like Deadpool (2016), the film would be different from the core X-Men films, "maybe not as different as Deadpool, but it has its own unique, original voice to it". Kinberg said that the film would have a young adult "vibe", and that there was potential for characters seen in previous films to appear, namely Warpath, Sunspot, and Charles Xavier / Professor X, who all have ties to the New Mutants in the comics. Also at that time, it was reported that Maisie Williams and Anya Taylor-Joy were being looked at to star in the film as Rahne Sinclair / Wolfsbane and Illyana Rasputin / Magik, respectively. The rest of the title team was expected to consist of the characters Sam Guthrie / Cannonball, Roberto da Costa / Sunspot, and Danielle Moonstar / Mirage. Sunspot previously appeared in X-Men: Days of Future Past (2014), portrayed by Adan Canto, who was not confirmed to be returning for the new film. James McAvoy, who portrayed Professor X in several previous X-Men films, was said to have a significant role in this one, alongside Alexandra Shipp, who was expected to reprise her role of Storm from X-Men: Apocalypse.

In May 2016, Kinberg confirmed that the script included Professor X, and he stated his hope for filming to start at the beginning of 2017. By that August, the titular team's roster had expanded to include the character Warlock, while Scott Neustadter and Michael H. Weber—who worked with Boone writing The Fault in Our Stars—were working on a new draft of the script while Boone and Lee were busy on another project. In November, the report of Williams and Taylor-Joy's casting was believed to be accurate, and Nat Wolff was being looked at for the role of Cannonball after working with Boone on The Fault in Our Stars. The character Demon Bear was set as the film's main antagonist, with the project aiming for more of a "'Stephen King meets John Hughes'-style horror movie". Boone soon noted that the Demon Bear was a very personal villain for him as a child, as he "was raised by very religious parents. They were Evangelical Southern Baptists and they believed in the rapture; they believed the devil was real; they believed in demons."

=== Pre-production ===
The film entered pre-production in Boston, Massachusetts, in April 2017, in preparation for filming to begin in that city. Location scouting took place, including at Medfield State Hospital which was previously used as a filming location for Shutter Island (2010). Fox scheduled New Mutants for an April 13, 2018 release. Several weeks later, the studio officially announced the casting of Taylor-Joy and Williams and that it was "making serious efforts to find ethnically appropriate actors" for the rest of the cast, searching for South American and Native American actors to respectively play Sunspot and Moonstar. By then, McAvoy was no longer slated to appear in the film; Wolff was no longer in the running to portray Cannonball; and Karen Rosenfelt was producing alongside Kinberg, who ultimately spent much of production focused on making Dark Phoenix (2019).

At the end of May, Henry Zaga was expected to be cast as Sunspot, and Rosario Dawson—who also portrays the Marvel character Claire Temple across the various Marvel Netflix television series—was in talks to join the film as Cecilia Reyes, a mentor to the titular team. It was explained that McAvoy was no longer involved due to Professor X being written out of the script with further drafts, and Shipp's Storm had likewise been written out of the film. Illyana's brother Colossus, another character seen in previous X-Men films, also does not appear despite being included in early versions of the script, with Boone choosing to save him for future films. Boone confirmed the film would be "a full-fledged horror movie set within the X-Men universe. There are no costumes. There are no supervillains. We're trying to do something very, very different." He had previously said that he does not like horror films, except for "classic ones" such as The Exorcist (1973), Rosemary's Baby (1968), and The Shining (1980), but was looking to "pioneer and champion doing prestige versions of horror films" based on his love for horror novels such as King's works. At the end of the month, Charlie Heaton was in talks to portray Cannonball.

Zaga, Dawson, and Heaton were confirmed to have been cast at the start of June, and newcomer Blu Hunt was cast as Moonstar after an extensive and challenging international search that prioritized "ethnic authenticity". The character was believed to be central to the Demon Bear storyline that the film focuses on. At the end of that month, Dawson exited the film, and Alice Braga was cast as Reyes in her place. The final shooting script for the film included contributions from Scott Frank, Josh Zetumer, Chad and Carey Hayes, Seth Grahame-Smith, Neustadter and Weber, along with a six-person "writer's room" that Fox hired to generate ideas for the film and also "tear apart the script and put it back together". Throughout the development process on the film, the script evolved from the "full horror" film that Boone and Lee initially wanted to make, and which Fox was resistant to, to a compromise version without "excessive blood and scares" and more "young adult"-focused. Boone created storyboards with artist Ashley R. Guillory to plan out all of the shots before filming.

The casting of Henry Zaga as Roberto da Costa was met with some controversy. Zaga, while Brazilian in real life, portrays a character who in the comics is of Afro-Brazilian descent. Boone stated, "my goal was to cast a real Brazilian and I saw 300 of myself black, brown, lighter-skinned. I saw every shade of the sun. It was the same case with Blu Hunt...My goal was to find the best actor who, because they've done so little work, was at least the closest to kind of what I saw in my head for the character...maybe if Henry didn't exist, I would have found somebody who was darker skinned who exemplified what I needed. But it was never about the color of their skin for me." He added that he was not concerned with the real life racism that existed in Brazil and that he wanted the character to be a positive representation of the nation.

=== Filming ===
Principal photography began on July 10, 2017, in Boston, under the working title Growing Pains. Peter Deming served as cinematographer for the film. The majority of the film was shot on location at Medfield State Hospital, where Boone said every crew member had "weird things happen to them". Boone wanted to use practical effects as much as possible to make the film feel like the horror movies that he grew up with. For example, he had actors push on sheets of spandex to create the effect of figures pushing through the walls of a room, a technique originated by Wes Craven. Ten percent of the film used green screen. On the film's set, Boone explained that the script had been re-written following the mixed critical response of Apocalypse, so that the plot is set during modern day rather than in the 1980s, which removed Professor X and Storm from the story. Boone felt the film was not largely affected by this change since its confined location and lack of technology meant "it might as well be the 80s in terms of the setting. It didn't change our story very much."

Fox chairman and CEO Stacey Snider described the film's setting as a The Breakfast Club (1985) detention crossed with a One Flew Over the Cuckoo's Nest (1975) institution. She said the film was "a haunted-house movie with a bunch of hormonal teenagers. We haven't seen a superhero movie whose genre is more like The Shining than 'we're teenagers let's save the world.'" Boone was also influenced by A Nightmare on Elm Street 3: Dream Warriors (1987). He explained that Warlock had been deemed too expensive to portray on the film's budget, but could appear in a sequel, and clarified that the Demon Bear would not be the main antagonist of the film, but would appear since the film was "very much inspired" by the comics in which that character is the main villain. Filming also took place in the Massachusetts towns of Millis, Lynn, and Weymouth, and ended on September 16, 2017. The film's principal photography was described as "stressful" for Boone, who felt "a bit neutered" during the process due to having to tone down the film from his original "full horror" ideas.

=== Post-production ===
==== Initial cut ====
Boone and his regular editors Matthew Rundell and Robb Sullivan delivered a cut of the film to Fox that they were happy with, and it tested as well as initial screenings of Deadpool did. Three days of additional photography were planned to complete the "YA movie" that Boone, Lee, and Fox had agreed to make. However, following the successful release of the film It (2017), the studio cut the first trailer for The New Mutants to focus on the "scary elements from the film, essentially selling it as a straight-up horror movie". With the positive reception to the preview, Fox decided to make the film more like Boone's original vision rather than completing the version that they had been making during production.

==== Planned reshoots ====
In January 2018, the film's release date was pushed back to February 22, 2019. This allowed it to avoid Deadpool 2 (2018), which had just been moved to a date that would have had both films in theaters at the same time in certain markets. It also allowed time for the reshoots the studio required to make the film more in line with Boone's original vision. When asked about this delay the next month, Williams stated that there had been concerns during filming regarding the short turnaround from the end of photography to the previously set release date, especially with the amount of visual effects still needed to finish the film, so in her opinion the delay was "for the better". The additional photography was scheduled for mid-2018. It was expected to include the addition of several new characters who would appear throughout the film rather than just making cameo appearances.

In March 2018, Fox again delayed the film's release, distancing it from the new February 2019 release date for Dark Phoenix, rescheduling its release for August 2, 2019. At this point, the studio believed that the reshoots required were more extensive than previously considered, with intentions to reshoot at least half of the film. The intent was to make the film as distinct from the other entries in the series as possible, looking toward the variety of Deadpool and Logan (2017). They believed the film would not endure a similar fate to Fantastic Four (2015) which went through similar production issues and became a "flop", with the issues not being placed on Boone, allowing him to write and direct the reshoots to complete his original vision.

In addition to adjusting the tone of the film through reshoots, they also planned to change an antagonist subplot in the film. Originally intended to feature the Essex Corporation, which was first teased at the end of X-Men: Apocalypse, with a post-credits scene featuring the reveal of Jon Hamm as the villain Nathaniel Essex / Mister Sinister, Fox requested the reshoots to include a new post-credits scene introducing Antonio Banderas as Sunspot's father Emmanuel da Costa. Kinberg later denied that an actor was ever cast as Sinister when he revealed that the character had been intended to be included in the canceled Gambit film. Hamm later revealed that while there were talks to have him play Sinister, his scene was never filmed.

==== Disney acquisition ====
Reshoots for the film were slated to begin by the end of September 2018, with Kinberg stating: "audiences really embraced the notion of a superhero movie or a comic book movie that was, in its core, a horror film". Following the acquisition of Fox by Disney in March 2019, it was revealed that the additional photography had still not taken place, nor were they "planned so far". The work was dependent on Boone's involvement, and decisions being made to instead release the film on one of the streaming services owned by The Walt Disney Company. A month later at CinemaCon 2019, Disney confirmed that the film will be released, but indicated that its release date could be adjusted to better fit within Disney's existing schedule. A month after that, the studio pushed the film's release back to April 3, 2020, and the reshoots were set to take place later in 2019. Kinberg explained that they had take time to reschedule because the creative team was still deciding what portions of the film to reshoot due to the difficulty of reuniting the cast given their busy schedules.

In August 2019, Disney was reported to be unimpressed with the original cut of The New Mutants, believing it had "limited box office potential". Additional work was completed, after Disney acquired it, to align the film with Boone's original vision, and test screenings with these changes had been positive. In addition to making the film more horror-tinged, these changes also included removing overt connections to the X-Men films. However, the film as released does make reference to the previous entries, with the inclusion of the Essex Corporation connecting the film to the post-credits scene of Apocalypse and to Logan. By December of the same year it was confirmed that work on the film had been taking place, while marketing had been adjusted to align with the style of Marvel Studios. Boone stated that the latest version of the film followed his original vision. In January 2020, Disney's official fan club website D23 described the film as a "new addition to the Marvel Cinematic Universe (MCU)", a statement that was quickly picked up by fans and reporters. Soon after, all mentions of the film were removed from the website, while Disney identified this as an error and stated that the film would not be part of the MCU.

==== Final cut ====
On March 7, 2020, Boone stated that the film was complete. Shortly after, he explained that work on the film had halted when Disney's acquisition of Fox had begun and so no reshoots ever took place on the film, not even standard pickups that had already been scheduled during initial production. At the time, around 75 percent of the film had been edited while much of the film's visual effects were also not finished. By the time the acquisition was completed, Boone had moved on and was about to begin work on a new television series The Stand (2020–2021). Before he started production on that series, Disney asked Boone if he would return to finish the film. Rundell and Sullivan were committed to working on The Stand at that point and could not continue editing The New Mutants, so Boone brought on editor Andrew Buckland to help finish the film.

The work required to finish the film when Boone returned involved completing the visual effects and editing alongside co-writer Lee, which took several months. Reshoots for the film could have been scheduled at that point, but Boone found that the three-year wait since principal photography meant that the young cast had aged too much. He also felt it did not make sense to add the post-credit scenes of Banderas since it was unlikely that they would be able to make a sequel now that Disney owned the X-Men rights and was integrating the property into the MCU. Describing returning to the film after so long, Boone said, "we hadn't seen it in a year. We did a bunch of things here and there that we hadn't thought about or noticed a year before." The visual effects that still needed to be finished included Illyana's sorceress abilities, including her Soulsword that she materializes, as well as her dragon companion Lockheed. Visual effects for the film were provided by DNEG, Method Studios, and Moving Picture Company, with Olivier Dumont serving as VFX supervisor. After the film was completed, Boone reunited the cast for the first official screening in New York City, after which Williams stated, "The movie is exactly the movie we set out to make."

Disney removed The New Mutants from its release schedule, along with several other films, on March 12, 2020, due to the COVID-19 pandemic, and was looking to reschedule the film's release to a later 2020 date. On May 4, the film was automatically listed for home media pre-order on Amazon based on the film's previous April 2020 release date. Amazon took the listing down hours later after it had been widely reported on. At that time, the film was still expected to receive a theatrical release rather than be released straight-to-streaming as other films had been during the pandemic. Shortly after, Disney scheduled the film for release on August 28, 2020.

== Release ==
=== Marketing ===
The first trailer for the film was released in October 2017, on Friday the 13th, with a horror focus inspired by the success of the film It, which had been released the month before. Sara Vilkomerson of Entertainment Weekly felt that trailer delivered on Boone's promise of a different type of X-Men film and was "creepy". Vilkomerson also noted the trailer's use of Pink Floyd's "Another Brick in the Wall, Part 2"; the title treatment for the film introduced in the trailer evokes the treatment used for that song. Alex McLevy, writing for The A.V. Club, also felt that Boone had delivered on his promise of a "straight-up horror film" and said, "Congrats to this creative team for trying something different with the superhero genre." Writing for /Film, Hoai-Tran Bui said the film looked like a bottle episode for the X-Men franchise and noted that telling a standalone story led to success for Deadpool. Bui also compared the trailer's tone to Stranger Things (in which Heaton also stars as Jonathan Byers) and Braga's performance as Reyes to Nurse Ratched. Boone, Lee, Braga, Zaga, and Sienkiewicz promoted the film at a 2017 Comic Con Experience panel, where they also talked about their plans for future films.

A new trailer, incorporating the changes made to the film following Disney's acquisition of Fox, was released on January 6, 2020. Boone sent the trailer to Sienkiewicz in December 2019, and the comic book artist praised it as "phenomenal". He stated that the horror elements of the film were still present in the trailer, but that it now also appeared to have been influenced by the style of Disney's Marvel Studios who he said had appeared to give the latest version of the film "the blessings of Marvel". Aja Romano of Vox also compared the horror elements of this trailer to Stranger Things and felt the film looked like "highly entertaining, if predictable, fun". io9's Charles Pulliam-Moore praised the more comic-accurate superhero abilities included in the new trailer, especially Magik's, and felt that the less superhero-like elements could be what saves the film from being a "flop" like Dark Phoenix. Writing about the trailer for Forbes, Scott Mendelson said the film "seems to be pretty similar in content and tone to what was always promised" and discussed its interesting position as "just a movie" now that the X-Men franchise had ended and future New Mutants films were unlikely after Marvel Studios took control of mutant-based films.

Weeks before the film's then-set April 2020 release date, Graeme McMillan of The Hollywood Reporter discussed several television spots released for the film. He stated that the first two, titled "Awaken" and "Escape", followed the tone and style of the previous trailers, while the third one, "Attitude", presented the film more like a traditional superhero film, focusing on action, quips, and superpowers. McMillan felt this was an abrupt shift in marketing given "Attitude" was released just one week after the other two spots and questioned whether the change in tone was to align the marketing to the film or just an attempt to boost interest in the film by reminding audiences of other popular superhero films.

A panel for the film was held during the virtual 2020 Comic-Con@Home convention, with Boone and members of the cast. A teaser for the film, to announce the panel, was also released. Ethan Anderton from /Film felt Taylor-Joy had "a great moment referencing herself" as Magik in the teaser and felt the footage "doesn't look half-bad", though he could not say he was excited for the film because of its extensive delays. Anderton also questioned if the film would hold its then-set August 28, 2020 release date, given higher profile films like Tenet and Mulan had shifted back into August, and wondered if the Comic-Con panel would announce a new theatrical release date or a move to Disney+. Germain Lussier at io9 also felt Disney would use the Comic-Con panel to announce new release plans for the films, but the panel reaffirmed the film's August 28 theatrical release date while acknowledging the film's many delays. The film's opening scene was revealed during the panel, which Sienkiewicz joined to discuss a new poster he had drawn for the film.

=== Theatrical ===
The New Mutants was released in the United States on August 28, 2020. It was originally set to be released on April 13, 2018, before being delayed to February 22, 2019, to avoid Deadpool 2, and then to August 2, 2019, to avoid Dark Phoenix. It was delayed to April 3, 2020, by Disney after that studio acquired Fox, and then removed from Disney's schedule in March 2020 due to the COVID-19 pandemic. Disney rescheduled the film for August 28, 2020, two months later. The various delays have led to several online commentators referring to the film as "cursed" and lamenting its bad luck. Boone and the film's cast acknowledged this "curse" during the 2020 Comic-Con@Home convention, which included a "cheeky teaser trailer" that recounted the film's release dates and ended with a "Fingers Crossed" note beside the August 28 date. Boone also revealed the various contracts signed for the film guaranteed a theatrical release, preventing it from first being released on either Disney+ or Hulu.

=== Home media ===
The New Mutants was released on DVD, Blu-ray and Ultra HD Blu-ray by Walt Disney Studios Home Entertainment on November 17, 2020.

== Reception ==
=== Box office ===
The New Mutants grossed $23.9 million in the United States and $25.3 million in other territories for a worldwide total of $49.2 million.

Originally tracking to debut to around $20 million in the United States before the COVID-19 pandemic, The New Mutants was projected to gross $5–10 million from 2,412 theaters in its opening weekend. The film made $3.1 million on its first day, including $750,000 from Thursday night previews. It went on to debut to $7 million, finishing first at the box office. With 62% of theaters in the country open (operating at 25–50% capacity), the audience was 66% male, with 61% being between 18 and 34. In its second weekend, the film fell 59% to $2.9 million, despite adding over 340 theaters, finishing second behind newcomer Tenet, then made $2.1 million in its third weekend and $1.6 million in its fourth.

Internationally, the film was released day-and-date with the U.S. in 10 countries and made $2.9 million over its first weekend, including $1.1 million in France, $500,000 in Spain, and $400,000 in Taiwan. Expanding to 30 countries in its second weekend, the film made another $4.2 million.

=== Critical response ===
On Rotten Tomatoes, the film has an approval rating of 36% based on 137 reviews, with an average rating of 4.8/10. The website's critics consensus reads, "Rendering a list of potentially explosive ingredients mostly inert, The New Mutants is a franchise spinoff that's less than the sum of its super-powered parts." On Metacritic, the film has a weighted average score of 43 out of 100, based on 20 critics, indicating "mixed or average reviews".

Writing for The Hollywood Reporter, Jordan Mintzer said, "Generic and, at its best, straining to be heartfelt, director Josh Boone's adaptation of the Marvel spin-off comic series is a Marvel movie spinoff in its own right, making vague references to the X-Men franchise but attempting to stand on its own. Unfortunately it rarely does, even if the film's trio of young and tough female leads manages to give your typically male-dominated genre something of a feminine twist." Peter Debruge of Variety said, "Despite all the meddling and interference the film reportedly went through, The New Mutants feels pretty coherent in the end. What it doesn't achieve is a memorable personality of its own." The Daily Telegraph's Tim Robey gave it 3/5 stars, writing, "Any depth in these roles has been blatantly sacrificed to a brisk, unpretentious 94-minute running time, but Maisie Williams makes the most of what she gets as a Scottish-accented lesbian lycanthrope called Wolfsbane, as if determined to be absolutely no one’s bog-standard love interest."

Amy Nicholson of The New York Times wrote, "Directed in 2017 by Josh Boone... The New Mutants spent three years on ice before being allowed to escape into the slowest summer season in a century. That's fitting for a film that's all buildup and no bang." The Globe and Mail's Barry Hertz gave the film 1.5 out of 4 stars, writing, "Instead of funnelling his inspirations into one singular vision that he could call his own, Boone has made a Frankenstein of a franchise movie, a giant elevator pitch that leads directly to the sub-basement of originality." The Independent's Clarisse Loughrey gave it 2/5 stars, writing, "The New Mutants tramples over its own comic book credentials in order to chase after a concept already more convincingly dealt with by The Chilling Adventures of Sabrina or Buffy the Vampire Slayer".

In the days leading up to the film's release, several major publications, including RogerEbert.com, IndieWire, The A.V. Club, and The Boston Globe, refused to review the film, citing Disney's lack of socially distanced press screenings or digital streaming links and noting that it was not safe to attend a traditional public screening due to the COVID-19 pandemic.

=== Accolades ===
The New Mutants received a nomination for Best Thriller Poster at the 2018 Golden Trailer Awards. The film was nominated for a Saturn Award for Best Comic to Motion Picture Release in 2021.

=== Comics comparison ===
The New Mutants comics co-creator, Bob McLeod, expressed his disappointment with the film for inaccurately depicting the characters: "I was disappointed when they didn't give Dani braids, although I like Blu Hunt. I was disappointed when Rahne wasn't a redhead with spiky hair, although I adore Maisie Williams. I was disappointed that Sam isn't tall and gawky, although I do like Charlie Heaton. But mainly I was very disappointed that Roberto isn't short and dark-skinned. Yet another example of Hollywood white-washing." He also criticized the film for misspelling his name in the credits as "MacLeod". The spelling was corrected for the home media release. Criticism was also directed to Braga, a white Brazilian woman, playing Dr. Cecilia Reyes, a black Puerto Rican character. McLeod further felt that fitting the film into the horror genre was a mistake and that it most likely would have fared better had it been a straightforward origin film, akin to the graphic novel that he and Chris Claremont created together. After his comments went viral, he said he felt bad for Henry Zaga, who plays Sunspot, and told people to calm down and that the movie looked like great fun.

== Cancelled sequels ==
Boone and Lee originally pitched the film to Kinberg as the first in a trilogy. In October 2017, Boone said that the characters Warlock and Karma would appear in the sequels. In December, Boone and Lee revealed that they were interested in filming the first sequel in Brazil and that Sunspot's father Emmanuel da Costa would play a role in the franchise. Explaining his plans for the sequels, Boone said that he wanted each film in the trilogy to be a different kind of horror movie. The first film is a "'rubber-reality' supernatural horror movie", the second film would have been an alien invasion film featuring Warlock, and the third film would have been an apocalyptic horror film inspired by the 1989 comic book crossover storyline "Inferno". Boone confirmed that the second film would have been set in Brazil and included Antonio Banderas as Emmanuel da Costa. Karma was to be introduced as the villain of the sequel but would have joined the New Mutants by the end of the film alongside Warlock. Boone added that Emmanuel da Costa's connections to the Hellfire Club would have been explored in the first sequel, and he said the overall tone of that film would still have been inspired by Claremont and Sienkiewicz's run. Boone had wanted Sacha Baron Cohen to portray Warlock through motion capture and had discussed the role with Cohen during production on the first film.

In March 2019, Disney officially acquired Fox and gained the film rights to several Marvel Comics characters for Marvel Studios, including the New Mutants. The Marvel-based films that Fox had been developing were placed "on hold". In March 2020, Boone stated that while it was unlikely that a sequel to The New Mutants could be made now that X-Men characters were being integrated into the Marvel Cinematic Universe, he still hoped that the film would be successful enough to allow a sequel to be made. That August, Boone confirmed that there were no plans to incorporate the film into the MCU.
