= Danielle Moonstar =

Marvel Comics superhero

Danielle "Dani" Moonstar Mirage
- Dani Moonstar on the variant cover for The Fearless Defenders #4. Art by Stephanie Hans.

Publication information
- Publisher: Marvel Comics
- First appearance: The New Mutants (September 1982)
- Created by: Chris Claremont; Bob McLeod

In-story information
- Full name: Danielle "Dani" Moonstar
- Species: Human mutant
- Team affiliations: New Mutants; Valkyrior; S.H.I.E.L.D. Hellions; Mutant Liberation Front; X-Force; Xavier Institute; The Initiative; Young X-Men; Fearless Defenders; X-Men; X-Corps; Society of the Eternal Dawn
- Notable aliases: Psyche; Mirage; Moonstar
- Abilities: Valkyrie Abilities: Superhuman strength, speed, durability, stamina and agility; Psi-link with Brightwind; Ability to sense impending death in others; Ability to repel death-based specters; Energy projection; Magic immunity; Weapons expert; Mutant psi abilities: Telepathy; Danger sense; Creating illusions; Psionic bow & arrows; Psionic bullets; Psionic bolts; Empathic/telepathic link with animals; Ability to create solid objects out of psionic energy

Danielle "Dani" Moonstar (also known as Psyche, Mirage, and Moonstar) is a character appearing in American comic books published by Marvel Comics. She first appeared in the graphic novel The New Mutants (Sept. 1982), created by writer Chris Claremont and artist Bob McLeod. The character is usually depicted as associated with the New Mutants, but has also served as a member of the Valkyries of Asgard.

A mutant, Mirage originally possessed the psionic/psychic ability to telepathically create illusions of her opponents' fears or wishes. She later developed a wide range of psionic and energy manipulation powers, and gained magical abilities after a series of adventures in Asgard. She was a member of the New Mutants and, after a long absence, its reincarnation as X-Force. She was also a member of the Fearless Defenders and the X-Men. She was depowered after the "Decimation" storyline, but later regained her mutant powers after being infected with and then cured of Warlock's transmode virus.

Blu Hunt portrayed Danielle Moonstar in the 2020 film The New Mutants.

== Publication history ==
Created by writer Chris Claremont and artist Bob McLeod, Mirage first appeared in The New Mutants (November 1982), part of the line Marvel Graphic Novel, and appeared as a feature character in The New Mutants (1983), New Mutants (vol. 2) (2003), New X-Men (vol. 2) (2004), Young X-Men (2008), and New Mutants (vol. 3) (2009). She also appeared for a portion of the initial run of X-Force (1991), first as an infiltrator to the Mutant Liberation Front and later as a regular X-Force team member. She was briefly a supporting character in Avengers: The Initiative (2007) and can be seen sporadically as a background character in Uncanny X-Men and other X-Men titles throughout the late 2000s and early 2010s. She appeared as a regular team member in the 2013 series The Fearless Defenders. After several years as an infrequent supporting character, Mirage was again featured prominently in Uncanny X-Men (vol. 5) (2019) and New Mutants (vol. 4) (2020–2023). After the end of the Krakoan Age, she appeared as a supporting character in Magik (vol. 2) (2025) and starred in her own solo series, Moonstar (2026).

== Fictional character biography ==
=== Origin ===
Danielle "Dani" Moonstar is a Native American (specifically, Cheyenne), and was born in Boulder, Colorado to William and Peg Lonestar. As with most mutants, Dani's powers emerge during puberty, uncontrollably creating telepathic images of people's greatest fears. Her burgeoning powers alienate her from her community and give her a vision of her parents' deaths at the claws of a demonic bear. Shortly afterwards, her parents disappear while on a hunting trip and Dani is taken in by her grandfather, Black Eagle. Black Eagle contacts Professor Charles Xavier, an old friend of Dani's father who fought with him in the Vietnam War, to teach her to control her powers. Dani is opposed to leaving home, though she reluctantly agrees after she inadvertently gives her grandfather a vision of his own death in her initial anger at the idea. Before Xavier arrives, however, Black Eagle is killed by agents of the Hellfire Club, led by Donald Pierce. Vowing revenge, Dani joins the New Mutants, taking the codename Psyche. After the team defeats Pierce, Psyche enrolls at Xavier's School for Gifted Youngsters and remains with the New Mutants.

=== The New Mutants ===
Psyche in her first appearance in The New Mutants (Nov. 1982). Art by Bob McLeod.

Psyche is featured as a member of the eponymous team throughout The New Mutants. She becomes the co-leader of the team alongside Cannonball after Karma's disappearance and develops a deep friendship with Wolfsbane, her empathic abilities making her the only member of the team capable of communicating with Wolfsbane while in her wolf form.

Psyche is plagued by nightmares of the bear she envisioned killing her parents. It soon becomes clear that this creature, known as the Demon Bear, is no mere vision, but a malevolent magical entity that is purposefully seeking her out, no longer held at bay by protective spells her grandfather had placed on her before his death. The New Mutants battle the Demon Bear and when Magik cleaves the creature in two with her Soulsword, its corpse transforms into Dani's missing parents, who had in fact been abducted and enslaved by an evil spirit (later revealed to be the Adversary). Though reunited with her family, Psyche opts to remain with the New Mutants and changes her codename to Mirage.

When the team becomes stranded in Asgard, Mirage rescues a winged horse from hunters and bonds with him, naming him Brightwind. She inadvertently becomes a Valkyrie when Brightwind chooses her as his rider. This new role allows her to see the imminent deaths of others. When the New Mutants return to Earth, Brightwind accompanies Mirage. The New Mutants later develop an intense rivalry with the Hellions, another team of young mutants formed by the White Queen of the Hellfire Club. This rivalry is later somewhat cooled when Mirage bonds with the Hellions' leader, Thunderbird.

During a battle to save former teammate Magma from the High Evolutionary, Mirage is thrown into a machine intended to strip mutants of their powers. Instead, the machine (the effects of which had been reversed by two of the Evolutionary's victims) enhances her mutation, giving her the ability to make her telepathic images real.

When Hela, the Asgardian goddess of death, enacts a plan to take over Asgard and uses her magic to seize control of the Valkyries, Mirage falls under her influence. The combined forces of Asgard and the rest of the New Mutants ultimately defeat Hela and Mirage chooses to stay behind in Asgard to rebuild and fully assume the responsibilities of a Valkyrie. This angers Hotamitanio, a Cheyenne deity, who comes to Asgard to bring her back to Earth. Mirage ultimately persuades him to allow her to remain by promising that she will one day return to her tribe.

=== X-Force ===
Mirage falls from grace and is exiled from Asgard back to Earth, accompanied by Brightwind (renamed Darkwind). She joins S.H.I.E.L.D., and infiltrates the Mutant Liberation Front (M.L.F.) as a deep cover operative, using the name Moonstar. Since her last appearance, she has refined her psychic ability so that she can create "psychic arrows" which incapacitate their targets. Her assignment brings her into many conflicts with old allies, primarily X-Force (a continuation of the New Mutants), but also Excalibur and Moira MacTaggert. Moonstar secretly works against the M.L.F., including working with Cable to turn Feral over to law enforcement authorities for past crimes and sabotaging a mission in China. Despite her opposition to the organization, Moonstar develops a genuine friendship with Forearm. She is discovered as a double-agent by the M.L.F.'s leader, Reignfire, and Darkwind is killed in the ensuing battle.

Later, she seeks X-Force's help to stop an invasion of Asgard by the dark elf Malekith. When most of the M.L.F. is apprehended during the 1997 "Operation: Zero Tolerance" event, Moonstar is able to extricate herself from the organization with X-Force's aid and joins the team. After an encounter with Arcadia, she gains the ability to manipulate quantum energy for a short time, but this power disappears after Arcadia's defeat. Moonstar quits X-Force when the team enlists Pete Wisdom to lead them.

=== New X-Men ===
Dani displaying parental concern for Elixir in her role as his legal guardian.

After a short time as a part-time member of the X-Men while also attending college, Dani regularly appears in both New Mutants (vol. 2) and New X-Men (vol. 2), in which she becomes the American history teacher at the Xavier Institute and the mentor of the New Mutants Squad, as well as the legal guardian of Elixir. During this time, she reunites with former teammates Karma and Wolfsbane. She helps Wolfsbane deal with the traumatic return of her lycanthropic powers, but the discovery of an inappropriate romantic liaison between Wolfsbane (a staff member at the institute) and Elixir (a student) drives a wedge between them.

During her appearances in New Mutants (vol. 2) and New X-Men (vol. 2), the bulk of Dani's powers appear to have reverted to their original depictions. She also retains some of her Valkyrie abilities, namely the ability to sense imminent death, though they are greatly diminished. In the wake of the 2005 "House of M" event, however, Dani is one of the many mutants who lose their powers. She is fired from her position at the institute by Emma Frost, who feels that, as a human, she is no longer safe nor has any right to remain at the school. She briefly reappears in Generation M #5 (May 2006), in which she reveals that she has not dreamt since losing her powers.

=== The Initiative ===
Following the "Civil War" event, Dani is recruited by the Initiative program to serve as an instructor to the next generation of superheroes, alongside her former colleague Beast. She is brought in to train Trauma in the use of his powers, as they are similar in nature to hers. However, due to her belief that Trauma could and should use his powers in a therapeutic way, Henry Peter Gyrich, who intends to use Trauma as a weapon for the Initiative, is quick to dismiss her once she provides Trauma with enough training in using his powers.

=== Young X-Men ===
Dani features prominently in Young X-Men, in which she is targeted for capture by the eponymous team, led by Donald Pierce disguised as Cyclops. After Pierce is exposed and defeated, she moves to Utopia, the X-Men's island base off the coast of San Francisco, and works as a trainer for the Young X-Men for the remainder of the series.

=== New Mutants Reunion ===
Moonstar temporarily regains her Valkyrie powers.

Dani joins the X-Men's New Mutants squad in New Mutants (vol. 3), proving to be a capable team member despite not having powers. She eventually reclaims the codename Mirage. When Norman Osborn's Dark Avengers prepare to attack Utopia, Mirage makes a deal with Hela to restore her Valkyrie powers and revive Brightwind. She defeats Ares in a brutal battle. She also serves as Hela's Valkyrie during the 2009–2010 "Siege" event. After Cannonball resigns from the squad, Mirage takes his place as team leader. During this time, she has a brief romantic relationship with teammate Nate Grey.

=== Fearless Defenders ===
Mirage joins the cast of The Fearless Defenders to combat the machinations of Caroline Le Fay, after which she makes sporadic appearances as a supporting character in various X-Men titles. In the aftermath of the 2013–2014 "Infinity" event, she uses her Valkyrie powers to locate mutants suffering from the M-Pox, notably rescuing Lady Mastermind from succumbing to the disease. Mirage later appears infrequently in X-Men Gold (2017–2018), in which she is a mentor at the Xavier Institute. She is present at the aborted wedding of Kitty Pryde and Colossus.

=== Dead Souls and Uncanny X-Men ===
Mirage's next major appearance is in the 2018 limited series The New Mutants: Dead Souls. When Karma sends her to investigate an explosion in Canterbury, Connecticut, Mirage succumbs to a transmode virus infection after coming into contact with the remains of former New Mutants teammate Warlock. Merging with the techno-organic alien, she becomes the gestalt entity Moonlock and subsequently infects Magik, Wolfsbane, Strong Guy, and later Karma. She and her infected friends are acquired by the Office of National Emergency (O*N*E) and forced into service as Sentinel-like mutant hunters and killers.

Mirage and the other infected New Mutants are later freed from O*N*E and cured of the virus by the X-Men. The virus restores her mutant powers and she joins the X-Men, appearing regularly in Uncanny X-Men (vol. 5) until the series' conclusion in late 2019.

During her tenure with the X-Men, Mirage appears in the 2019 "The War of the Realms" storyline as the last living Valkyrie, fighting against the invading forces of Malekith alongside her teammates. Mirage's psionic rapport with Wolfsbane notifies her of her former teammate's death, and she later attends Wolfsbane's funeral.

=== Krakoan Age ===
Following the establishment of Krakoa as a mutant nation, Mirage moves there and joins the New Mutants once more, appearing regularly throughout New Mutants (vol. 4) and New Mutants Lethal Legion (2023), as well as other X-Men titles published during the Krakoan Age. She uses her powers to help other mutants with their various traumas, including Karma and the resurrected Wolfsbane, and serves as Karma's partner in the Crucible, a combat ritual allowing latter to be reborn and thus free her brother's spirit. Mirage later helps free Amahl Farouk from the lingering influence of the Shadow King and aids Magik in transferring the throne of Limbo to Madelyne Pryor. Mirage also appears during the 2020–2021 "King in Black" event as a supporting character in the Return of the Valkyries tie-in series.

During the 2023 "Fall of X" event, Mirage is among the mutants mind-controlled by Professor X into evacuating Krakoa through a teleportation gate to escape the anti-mutant terrorist organization Orchis. However, in Realm of X (2023–2024), rather than joining the majority of the Krakoans in the White Hot Room, the young mutant Curse's reality-warping powers cause herself, Mirage, Magik, Dust, and Typhoid Mary to instead emerge in the Asgardian realm of Vanaheim, where they battle the sorceress Saturnyne alongside Thor before returning to Earth. After returning from Vanaheim, Mirage joins X-Corps as co-leader with Sunspot in the 2024 "External Threat" storyline of X-Men Unlimited Infinity Comic and fights the Externals to rescue kidnapped mutant children and stop Selene's attempt to ascend to higher power.

=== Post-Krakoa ===
Mirage is selected by Apocalypse to participate in the tournament that will decide his successor in the 2024 limited series X-Men: Heir of Apocalypse. Though she is one of the last four contestants, she is ultimately not chosen as Apocalypse's heir, the position instead going to Cypher.

Mirage next appears in Magik (vol. 2) (2025), in which it is revealed that following the fall of Krakoa, she encountered the Society of the Eternal Dawn, a secret organization of magic users dedicated to combating apocalyptic threats. Believing that the Dawn's knowledge and resources could help create a better future for mutants, Mirage joined the organization. During her membership in the Dawn, she teams up with Magik to thwart the escape plans of a demonic threat imprisoned by the Dawn. During their journey, Mirage has a therapeutic influence on Magik, who is struggling with the resurgence of her Darkchild persona. Later, the pair discover the true corrupt intentions of the Dawn's leader, the Embodiment, and defeat her, leaving the organization in disarray. In the aftermath, Mirage contemplates assuming leadership of the Dawn, still having faith in its original mission.

== Powers and abilities ==
=== Mutant powers ===
Mirage is a mutant with empathic psi abilities to communicate with animals and people, as well as create three-dimensional images of visual concepts from within the minds of herself and others. Her most developed ability allowed her to manifest people's fears or desires as realistic illusions. In the 2005 "Decimation" storyline, Mirage loses her mutant abilities, but regains them in Uncanny X-Men (vol. 5) (2019) after being infected with and cured of Warlock's transmode virus.

Her ability began as manifesting people's worst nightmares, many times in an uncontrollable fashion, against the wills of both involved. Soon she gained the ability to control this and to alternatively manifest a person's "deepest desire", mainly as something or someone the affected person respects. She can also project images of objects of fear or desire from the minds of vertebrate animals and certain insects, but only the animal from which she derives the image will be able to see it.

She can even create illusions by channeling residual thought and emotional impressions in an area (such as showing Wolverine a battle scene between Mister Sinister and unknown assailants simply by entering the area where the battle had recently taken place). At first, Mirage could not control her image projecting powers and would draw and project images without consciously willing to do so. She has since gained control through training and maturity.

Mirage has a quasi-telepathic talent that allows her to form a rapport with various fauna, including her winged horse Brightwind, primates, canines, lupines, felines, and avians. She can sense their feelings, consciously perceive images in their minds, and even see through their eyes. This enables her to communicate with Wolfsbane in her wolf form. She has also been able to exist peacefully with wild animals.

She had, for a time, the ability to make the telepathic images manifest as psionic energy, becoming tangible entities of solid psionic force. This ability was limited in that Mirage could only sustain one illusion at a time. To dispel previous manifestations, she summons a "Spirit Lance". Many times, her powers caused her to experience sharp, blinding headaches. She can temporarily regain the ability to create tangible mirages in strengthened capacity while in Otherworld.

Mirage has displayed the ability to focus her psionic powers into energy arrows which could stun an opponent by disrupting their central nervous system, or force them to relive a traumatic memory. In later publishing, her psi arrows have a more physical aspect to them, able to draw blood from those struck by them. It is currently unknown if this is an effect of her latent materialization abilities or not. After joining the Society of the Eternal Dawn, she was given an enchanted peach-wood bow named Dawn Piercer that amplifies her mutant abilities, including making her energy arrows capable of repelling demons.

Although not a traditional telepath, her mental abilities give her sufficient control to have used Cerebro at a time when it was only usable by telepaths. She has also exhibited a danger sense.

=== Valkyrie abilities ===
When Mirage rescued Brightwind, she became a Valkyrie and was granted the power to perceive the coming of death. As such, Mirage could perceive a "deathglow" surrounding a person in serious danger of dying, a dark cloud or graphic visual image over people who were in mortal peril. She could also perceive Death incarnate and even do physical battle with Death itself to stave off mortality for a short time. She has created an illusory "Cheyenne ghost-staff", drawing upon an image in her own mind, and has successfully wielded it as a weapon against Death and Hela.

She lost these powers when Asgard fell but has since regained them after making a deal with Hela.

Mirage gained a substantial degree of superhuman strength from Hela as she was able to knock Ares off his feet. Additionally, she wielded a powerful supernatural sword capable of discharging energy, slaying spiritual entities, and cutting through curses/enchantments. Dark Avengers writer Matt Fraction confirmed that since her restored Valkyrie powers came directly from Hela herself, they are much more powerful than they were previously, referring to her as a "Valkyrie Plus". New Mutants (vol. 3) writer Zeb Wells confirmed that she lost access to these powers after the Dark Avengers were defeated. Mirage still possesses her Valkyrie powers, but they initially were only activated when Hela herself willed it. Her abilities also seemed to activate in the presence of the dead. Over time, she learned to call on them at will without Hela's involvement.

=== Physical abilities ===
Due to her training at Xavier's, her time as a Valkyrie in Asgard, and her natural athleticism growing up in the Rocky Mountains, Mirage is physically fit and an excellent hand-to-hand combatant. In addition, she is experienced in the use of several weapons, especially the bow, spear, knife, and sword, which she carried as a Valkyrie. She is a skilled equestrian and swimmer, a good marksman with a rifle, and an excellent archer.

=== Former abilities ===
For a brief period of time, Mirage's powers were bolstered by Arcadia DeVille in odd yet phenomenal ways. She could tap into the primal mainstream of the universe to channel quantum energy through her natural mutant power, as well as make use of them in other various ways, such as: emitting force blasts potent enough to cripple powerful demons; healing and mending with a glancing touch; resisting the physiological and psychological invasion by the techno-organic mutant Paradigm; seeing into the broader energy spectrum beyond light and energy at a quantum level and causing a transmogrification effect on the surrounding area at a subatomic level; sensing disturbances in energy fields from miles away as well as alternate them to cancel them out and sync with alternate energy forms such as electromagnetic waves; and possessing an undisclosed capacity to manipulate reality on a quantum level.

== Reception ==
=== Critical reception ===
Bailey Jo Josie of Comic Book Resources (CBR) called Danielle Moonstar a "unique character," writing, "First known as Psyche, and then Mirage, Dani Moonstar came alive as one of the best characters of The New Mutants in the 1980s and a fine representation of a Native American - specifically Cheyenne Nation - superhero in Marvel comics."

=== Accolades ===
- In 2014, Entertainment Weekly ranked Danielle Moonstar 82nd in their "Let's rank every X-Man ever" list.
- In 2018, CBR ranked Danielle Moonstar 14th in their "X-Men's Greatest Leaders" list, 16th in their "20 Most Powerful Mutants From The '80s" list, and 11th in their "X-Force: 20 Powerful Members" list.
- In 2018, GameSpot ranked Danielle Moonstar 44th in their "50 Most Important Superheroes" list.
- In 2019, ComicBook.com ranked Danielle Moonstar 49th in their "50 Most Important Superheroes Ever" list.
- In 2020, Scary Mommy included Danielle Moonstar in their "Looking For A Role Model? These 195+ Marvel Female Characters Are Truly Heroic" list.
- In 2021, Screen Rant included Danielle Moonstar in their "10 Most Powerful Members Of The New Mutants" list and in their "10 Best Teen Marvel Heroes" list.
- In 2021, CBR ranked Danielle Moonstar 10th in their "10 X-Men Who Deserve Their Own Run" list.
- In 2022, Screen Rant included Danielle Moonstar in their "10 New Characters We Can Hope To See In X-Men ’97" list.

== Other versions ==
=== Age of Apocalypse ===
An alternate universe version of Dani Moonstar appears in "Age of Apocalypse". This version is part of the Pale Riders, a group of elite assassins loyal to Apocalypse. Her primary mission was to infiltrate and gather information on the religious group known as the "Ghost Dance" which facilitated a path for refugees to reach the legendary sanctuary called Avalon. Moonstar ultimately meets her end when fellow Pale Rider Damask kills her in a fit of rage over Moonstar's constant torment of Dead Man Wade.

=== Age of X ===
An alternate reality version of Moonstar appears in Legion's "Age of X" pocket reality. She is a tracker and leader of the Moonstar Cadre, a team of elite hunters and enforcers.

=== Age of X-Man: Prisoner X ===
Within the "Age of X-Man" pocket dimension, Dani Moonstar is a prisoner within a correctional facility for those who broke the laws of this world populated solely by mutants.

=== Days of Future Past ===
During a fight with Warlock's father, the Magus, Magik accidentally teleports the New Mutants into two alternative future timelines. In one of them, where the Sentinels have destroyed most of Earth's mutants, that timeline's version of Cannonball, Mirage, and Lila Cheney have established a guerrilla operation to take mutants to temporary safety in Cheney's Dyson sphere.

=== House of M ===
An alternate universe version of Moonstar appears in the "House of M" storyline. This version is a S.H.I.E.L.D. instructor who previously lost her left eye to anti-mutant terrorists.

=== Marvel Mangaverse ===
An alternate universe version of Moonstar appears in Marvel Mangaverse.

=== Ultimate Marvel ===
An alternate universe version of Dani Moonstar appears in the Ultimate Marvel imprint. This version is her universe's incarnation of Snowbird, possessing cryokinetic abilities derived from the Banshee drug.

=== X-Men: The End ===
In the alternate future depicted in X-Men: The End, Dani was imprisoned in Neverland, a concentration camp for mutants. Upon sensing Wolfsbane's death, Dani awakens from a coma and transcends death, leaving Earth with the intention of rebuilding the Bifröst.

=== What If? ===
In "What If... the X-Men Had Stayed in Asgard?", Mirage decides to remain in Asgard. When Hela dies due to Loki's machinations, Mirage is granted her powers to become the new goddess of death and the ruler of Hel, with Magik serving as her herald and liaison to Asgard.

== In other media ==
=== Television ===
Danielle Moonstar appears in the X-Men: Evolution episode "Ghost of a Chance", voiced by Tabitha St. Germain. This version possesses telepathic induction-based abilities, allowing her to project dreams and nightmares into people's minds. When her abilities first manifested, she lacked control, resulting in the inhabitants of her village alienating her and eventually abandoning the village altogether. After being trapped in a cave, she entered a state of suspended animation for two years until Shadowcat passes by, causing Moonstar to unknowingly and telepathically contact her. Upon finding and rescuing her with help from the rest of the X-Men, Shadowcat and Moonstar develop a telepathic link and become close friends while reuniting Moonstar with her grandfather.

=== Film ===
- Danielle Moonstar appears in the novelization of X-Men: The Last Stand as a student of the Xavier Institute.
- Danielle "Dani" Moonstar appears in The New Mutants, portrayed by Blu Hunt. Her Indian reservation was demolished by the Demon Bear and her body was later found by Dr. Cecilia Reyes who analyzed her for Essex Corporation. Moonstar later enters a lesbian relationship with Rahne Sinclair over the course of the film.

=== Video games ===
- Danielle Moonstar appears as a non-playable character in Marvel Heroes.
- Dani Moonstar appears as a playable character in Marvel: Contest of Champions.
- Moonstar appears as a playable character in Marvel Super War.
