= X-Treme Sanctions Executive =

Fictional comic book police force

Publication information
- Publisher: Marvel Comics
- First appearance: Uncanny X-Men #445 (August 2004)
- Created by: Chris Claremont

In-story information
- Base(s): Xavier Institute for Higher Learning
- Member(s): Bishop; Cannonball; Marvel Girl; Nightcrawler; Sage; Storm; Wolverine

The X-Treme Sanctions Executive is a fictional paramilitary police force appearing in American comic books published by Marvel Comics, in particular those featuring the X-Men, and related spinoffs. The organization is charged with keeping the peace between mutants and humans in the Marvel Comics universe. The team was first mentioned in X-Treme X-Men #40, when Storm presents her team with an offer to join a new, government-backed squad, and debuts in Uncanny X-Men #445 (August 2004).

== Publication history ==
During the final issues of X-Treme X-Men, Storm successfully campaigns the United Nations for a team that would be backed by the United Nations that would have legal authority to enforce peace between mutants and humans. The X-Treme Sanctions Executive, also known by the abbreviation XSE, debuts in Uncanny X-Men #445, following the return of writer Chris Claremont. Artists Alan Davis and Chris Bachalo illustrate several of the team's adventures.

Several former X-Treme X-Men members join the group, including Sage, Bishop and Cannonball, Wolverine, Nightcrawler and Rachel Summers, aka Marvel Girl.

While in England visiting Brian Braddock, the brother of the recently slain X-Man Psylocke, Marvel Girl, Cannonball and Bishop are attacked by a Fury. Sage is able to construct a plan to defeat The Fury, however Cannonball is forced to take a leave of absence to recuperate from his injuries. Afterwards, they deal with a murderous plot by crime kingpin from Madripoor, Viper. Sage subsequently rejoins the Hellfire Club to monitor its new Lord Imperial, and former X-Men charge Roberto da Costa, to ensure he is not corrupted by power, as Sebastian Shaw was.

After taking a resurrected Psylocke into custody, the team later visits the Savage Land, where Rachel is subjected to the mind-control of a tribe of advanced humanoid dinosaur people, the Hauk'ka, causing her to believe she belonged to their species. She then subconsciously uses her telekinesis to alter her own genome in their image. The Hauk'ka's seek to use Storm's power to control the weather to destroy humanity. When her powers become unstable, the Hauk'ka and the XSE are forced to work together to stop her from destroying the planet. After their mission is successful, the XSE made peace with Hauk'ka, and Rachel is released from their mind control.

Following the events of the "Decimation" storyline, and the decimation of the majority of the world's mutant populace, the team shifts their attention to aiding the remaining mutant populace, liaising with the Office of National Emergency. Storm chooses to work in Africa, to help the people of her native land.
