= Fenris Wolf (Marvel Comics) =

- The Fenris Wolf on the cover of Warriors Three #3 (February 2011). Art by Neil Edwards.

Publication information
- Publisher: Marvel Comics
- First appearance: Journey into Mystery #114 (Mar 1965)
- Created by: Stan Lee (writer); Jack Kirby (artist)

In-story information
- Species: Giant wolf

The Fenris Wolf is a fictional character appearing in American comic books published by Marvel Comics, based on the wolf Fenrir from Norse mythology.

Fenris, depicted as female, made her live-action debut in the Marvel Cinematic Universe film Thor: Ragnarok (2017). Alternate versions of Fenris appear in the animated series What If... ? (2023).

== Publication history ==
The Fenris Wolf first appeared in Marvel Comics in Journey into Mystery #114 (March 1965), and was adapted from Norse legends by Stan Lee and Jack Kirby.

The character subsequently appeared in Thor #276-278 (October–December 1978) and Thor (vol. 2) #80-83 (August–October 2004) and 85 (December 2004).

Fenris received an entry in the Official Handbook of the Marvel Universe Deluxe Edition #4.

== Fictional character biography ==
The Fenris Wolf is a creature of Asgardian origin, said to be the product of a union between Loki and the giantess Angrboda. The goddess Iduna once confronted Fenris while bringing golden apples to Odin. Fenris disguised himself as a human to fool Iduna, but she sensed that he was not a normal being. After Fenris returned to his regular form to attack, the hunter Haakun arrived and banished him to the shadowy land of Varinheim. This encounter evolved into the story of Little Red Riding Hood.

Just like Norse mythology, Odin had the Dwarfs forge the chain Gleipnir, which they used to chain Fenris to a rock. Tyr lost his hand in the process of chaining Fenris.

A giant offspring of Fenris, named Hoarfen, once battled the Hulk and his Pantheon allies. Fenris is also the ancestor of Hrimhari, the prince of Asgard's wolves.

=== True Ragnarok ===
Loki frees Fenris to aid him, Ulik, and Hyrm in attacking Asgard, using weapons forged by Surtur. Ulik and Fenris attack Thor together, only for Thor to attack them using Mjolnir, causing a blast that removes Sif's arm. Hyrm joins up with Ulik and Fenris and manages to shatter Mjolnir.

Fenris attacks Thor, Captain America, and Iron Man when they are in Asgard. When Fenris is about to attack Thor, Captain America kicks Fenris in the stomach to reclaim his shield, then Thor defeats him, causing him to flee.

Fenris assists in the attack on Vanaheim and faces Thor again in battle. Thor binds Fenris in chains and uses his body to knock down Durok and save Sif. With Durok killed, the Fenris Wolf escapes his chains and battles Thor, only to be killed by Beta Ray Bill.

Fenris returns to life and devours Asgard's sun and moon, contributing to the events of Ragnarok. Following Ragnarok, Asgard reforms and re-establishes itself over Broxton, Oklahoma. Fenris escapes from his prison, a place deep in the dimensional 'Hells' and steals a technological device capable of killing gods. The Warriors Three defeat Fenris, who is imprisoned in an Asgardian courtyard.

== In other media ==
=== Marvel Cinematic Universe ===
Fenris in Thor: Ragnarok.

- A female version of Fenris appears in Thor: Ragnarok. This version is an Asgardian wolf and Hela's pet who was killed a millennia ago, and resurrected in the present. She later battles the Hulk and is tossed off Asgard into the void below.
- Alternate universe variants of Fenris appear in the second season of What If...?.

=== Film ===
Fenris appears in Thor: Tales of Asgard, voiced by Brian Drummond. This version possesses an anthropomorphic appearance.

=== Television ===
- Fenris appears in The Avengers: Earth's Mightiest Heroes, with vocal effects provided by Fred Tatasciore.
- Fenris appears in the Ultimate Spider-Man episode "The Avenging Spider-Man" as one of several Asgardian creatures controlled by Venom.
- Fenris makes a non-speaking cameo appearance in the Avengers Assemble episode "A Friend in Need".

=== Video games ===
- An assortment of Fenris Wolves appear as enemies in Marvel: Ultimate Alliance.
- Fenris appears in Marvel Snap.
