= Wolfsbane (character) =

Marvel Comics superhero

- Wolfsbane as depicted on the cover of X-Factor (vol. 3) #11 (November 2006). Art by Ryan Sook.

Publication information
- Publisher: Marvel Comics
- First appearance: The New Mutants (September 1982)
- Created by: Chris Claremont; Bob McLeod

In-story information
- Alter ego: Rahne Grace Sinclair
- Species: Human mutant
- Place of origin: Ullapool, Ross and Cromarty, Scotland
- Team affiliations: X-Force; X-Factor Investigations; Paragons; Excalibur; X-Factor; New Mutants; Hellions; Xavier Institute; X-Men
- Abilities: Ability to shapeshift into a wolf-like humanoid or into a full wolf at will

Wolfsbane (Rahne Sinclair) is a character appearing in American comic books published by Marvel Comics. The character is commonly associated with the X-Men. A Scottish mutant, Wolfsbane can transform into a wolf or a transitional state that is similar to a werewolf. She honed her powers to shift between human and wolf characteristics but must keep her feral instincts at bay when she does.

She was initially a member of the X-Men's original junior team, the New Mutants. Later on, she joined the Pentagon-sponsored X-Factor and was also associated with the British superhero team Excalibur. She appeared for a time as a teacher at Xavier's Academy in New X-Men, then served as a member of the X-Factor Investigations detective agency, until she joined the newest incarnation of X-Force. The character later returned to X-Factor and made several appearances as a member of the X-Men before rejoining the New Mutants.

Wolfsbane has made minor appearances in animated television, and made her live-action debut in the 2020 film The New Mutants, portrayed by Maisie Williams.

== Publication history ==
Created by writer Chris Claremont and artist Bob McLeod, Wolfsbane first appeared in The New Mutants (September 1982), part of the Marvel Graphic Novel line. She starred as a founding member of the New Mutants and featured in nearly the entire run of The New Mutants (1983–1991), her last issue being #97. When the original five X-Men leave X-Factor to rejoin the X-Men, Wolfsbane is recruited to join when it becomes a government operation in X-Factor #71 (October 1991) and was featured as a team member through issue #111 (February 1995) before the title was interrupted by the "Age of Apocalypse" crossover. Afterward, Wolfsbane leaves X-Factor and joins Excalibur, starting with Excalibur #90 (October 1995) and appearing through the title's conclusion with issue #125 (October 1998).

Wolfsbane was a supporting character in the limited series Warlock (1999–2000), and then appeared sporadically in New Mutants (vol. 2) (2004) and New X-Men (2004–2005). With the relaunch of X-Factor (vol. 3) (2006), Wolfsbane once again saw regular publication as a central team member between issues #1 and #28 (2006–2008), after which she is transferred to the secret strike team X-Force. During her X-Force (vol. 3) run between 2008 and 2010, she becomes pregnant by the Asgardian Hrimhari and this pregnancy causes her to return to X-Factor, starting with X-Factor #207 (September 2010). Much of her time in X-Factor was dedicated to her pregnancy and her son, Tier, with her last appearance being in X-Factor #258 (August 2013). Wolfsbane made subsequent appearances in various X-Men titles, including X-Men Blue (2017), The New Mutants: Dead Souls (2018), and Uncanny X-Men (vol. 5) (2019). The character is killed in Uncanny X-Men (vol. 5) #17 (July 2019), but is revived during the Krakoan Age and appeared regularly in New Mutants (vol. 4) (2020–2023).

== Fictional character biography ==
=== Early life ===
Rahne (pronounced "Rain") Grace Sinclair was born in Ullapool, Scotland, the product of an illicit affair between Presbyterian minister Reverend Craig and an unnamed sex worker. She was delivered by Dr. Moira MacTaggert. Rahne's mother dies in childbirth and her father raises her as an orphan and a ward of the church without revealing that she is his biological child. When her mutant powers manifest, Reverend Craig leads an angry mob to kill her, believing her to be a werewolf. Rahne is rescued and later adopted by Dr. MacTaggert, who takes her to America to enroll at Xavier's School for Gifted Youngsters.

=== New Mutants ===
Taking the alias Wolfsbane, Rahne joins the New Mutants. Although she is a shy, emotionally repressed girl, she builds a strong friendship with her teammate Psyche and harbors a crush on Cannonball. Wolfsbane's strict religious upbringing often makes her uncomfortable when dealing with mythological entities, her sorceress teammate Magik, or demons, as well as being the root of her self-loathing over her mutant power. The clash between the intense joy of using her powers and her religious beliefs causes her inner turmoil. While in Asgard, she is disturbed to find herself attracted to Hrimhari, a shapeshifting wolf prince. Although he becomes her first serious love, she is unable to remain in Asgard without the rest of the New Mutants being forced to stay as well, so she returns to Earth with her teammates. Wolfsbane eventually begins a relationship with her teammate Cypher, and is devastated when he is killed by the Ani-Mator. She later has a short-lived relationship with her teammate Rictor.

=== X-Factor ===
During the 1990–1991 "X-Tinction Agenda" event, Wolfsbane is captured and brainwashed into slavery on Genosha. She is ultimately freed by transforming into her transitional lupine form, but she is unable to revert to her human form without succumbing to her Genoshan conditioning. After the fall of Genosha, Wolfsbane remains on the island with Havok to help rebuild and both later join the government-sponsored X-Factor. She develops feelings for Havok, a result of her Genoshan brainwashing and the feral nature of her transitional wolf form, and grows extremely jealous of his relationship with their teammate Polaris.

Wolfsbane appears in the 1992 miniseries The Infinity War and its 1993 sequel, The Infinity Crusade. During the former, she is part of the rear guard who stay behind on Earth at the Fantastic Four's headquarters and fight the various evil doubles that attack the building. In The Infinity Crusade, Wolfsbane's deep religious beliefs lead her to be approached by the Goddess. She, along with many other spiritual characters, is brainwashed into joining the Goddess' army but her mind is restored by the series' conclusion.

The effects of her Genoshan brainwashing are eventually completely undone by Haven and Wolfsbane is once again able to return to her human form.

=== Excalibur ===
Wolfsbane leaves X-Factor and travels to Moira MacTaggert's base on Muir Island to care for her after she contracts the Legacy Virus. While there, she joins Excalibur and develops deep friendships with her allies, particularly Colossus and Shadowcat. She overcomes much of her shyness, discovers the truth of her parentage in a confrontation with Reverend Craig, and is a bridesmaid at the wedding of Captain Britain and Meggan. Following Excalibur's disbanding, she and her teammate and love interest Douglock stay on Muir Island to assist Moira in her attempt to cure the Legacy Virus.

Wolfsbane appears in Warlock (1999–2000), in which she helps former New Mutants teammate Warlock (revealed to have been Douglock all along) and the Avengers defeat Bastion. During the 2000 "Dream's End" storyline, Muir Island comes under attack by the Brotherhood, resulting in Moira's apparent death, the destruction of the island, and the suppression of Wolfsbane's mutant powers when Mystique shoots her with a version of Forge's Neutralizer.

=== New X-Men ===
Textless cover of New Mutants (vol. 2) #10 (May 2004). Art by Chris Bachalo.

Wolfsbane spends some time motorcycling across the United States following the loss of her powers, becoming less introverted, growing out her hair, and losing her Scottish brogue before returning to New York in New Mutants (vol. 2). She is hired as a supervising staff member for the Paragons at the Xavier Institute and becomes a part-time employee of Jamie Madrox's detective agency, X-Factor Investigations.

During her appearances in both New Mutants (vol. 2) and New X-Men (vol. 2), Wolfsbane begins a relationship with Elixir, a student at the Xavier Institute. A passionate encounter between the two causes Elixir's mutant healing abilities to restore her powers. Though she ends the relationship upon being hired at the institute, Elixir continues to pursue her and they resume seeing each other in secret. Wolfsbane breaks up with Elixir again upon learning that he is casually dating his classmate Wallflower, but their inappropriate relationship is later exposed to the entire school by Wither in an attempt to end Elixir's budding romance with Wallflower. She subsequently resigns from her position at the institute and her friendship with Dani Moonstar, Elixir's legal guardian, becomes strained.

=== X-Factor Investigations ===
Wolfsbane joins the main cast of X-Factor (vol. 3), in which she begins working full-time for X-Factor Investigations and reunites with former love interest and New Mutants teammate Rictor, now depowered in the wake of M-Day. Many aspects of her previous persona return, including her close-cropped hairstyle and Scottish accent, and her devout Presbyterian religiosity remains a central aspect of her character. During her time with the detective agency, she is attacked by the villainous Tryp and given visions of a possible future in which her feral instincts become uncontrollable and drive her to murder Jamie Madrox and Layla Miller on their wedding day. She later confides in the agency's psychiatrist Doc Samson that she has considered killing herself to prevent this future from happening, conflicting with her religious beliefs on suicide. Wolfsbane also rekindles her relationship with Rictor, though their romance is cut short when she leaves the agency to join X-Force.

=== Messiah Complex ===
During the 2007–2008 "Messiah Complex" storyline, Wolfsbane is enlisted to help track down Cable and the infant Hope Summers. She also helps Rictor infiltrate the Purifiers and discovers that her father, Reverend Craig, has joined the anti-mutant organization. During the climactic battle, Wolfsbane is injured by Riptide, but her wounds, according to Professor X, are superficial.

=== X-Force ===
Following the "Messiah Complex" storyline, X-Force was relaunched in early 2008, featuring Wolfsbane as a member of the eponymous team. During an assault on the Purifiers' base, she is captured and brainwashed into a sleeper agent, compelled to attack and mutilate Angel. In a later confrontation with the Purifiers, Reverend Craig inadvertently triggers Wolfsbane's programming and, in her feral state, she attacks and devours him.

When the team decides that the psychological trauma Wolfsbane has experienced is too great for her to bear, the Stepford Cuckoos are summoned to undo her Purifier brainwashing. Before they can erase her traumatic memories of consuming her father, however, they are interrupted, and X-Force is sent on a mission, leaving Wolfsbane behind. While alone, she reunites and runs away with Hrimhari. Still conflicted over her experience with the Purifiers, she is encouraged to forgive herself by the wolf prince. After an intimate night, the two are attacked by a trio of Frost Giants. They manage to defeat them and although seemingly unharmed, Wolfsbane faints.

=== Secret Invasion ===
During the publication of X-Force (vol. 3), Wolfsbane appears in the "Secret Invasion" storyline as one of many heroes fighting off the Skrull invasion of San Francisco. She and the rest of X-Force are tasked with capturing one of the new Super-Skrulls so Beast can study them to find a weakness.

=== Necrosha ===
During the 2009–2010 "Necrosha" storyline, the unconscious Wolfsbane is brought to Utopia, the X-Men's island base off the coast of San Francisco, for healing, where it is discovered that she is pregnant with Hrimhari's child and the accelerated pregnancy is threatening her life. Desperate to save his lover and unborn child, Hrimhari trades his soul to Hela in exchange for the revival of a comatose Elixir, condemning himself to life in Hel. In order to ensure she survives her pregnancy, Elixir alters Wolfsbane's DNA, enhancing her strength and senses. Wolfsbane is subsequently removed from active duty on X-Force and decides to leave the team altogether.

=== Return to X-Factor Investigations ===
Wolfsbane returns to New York to rejoin X-Factor Investigations, discovering her ex-boyfriend Rictor and Shatterstar in an intimate embrace. After a brief fight with Shatterstar, she decides to "save" Rictor's soul by claiming that he is the father of her child, not wanting him to be damned to Hell for homosexuality. When the baby's true paternity is eventually revealed, she explains herself to Rictor, the two reconcile, and Rictor pursues his relationship with Shatterstar.

Throughout her pregnancy, Wolfsbane is hounded by various gods and demons who want her powerful unborn child for their own ends. She is abducted by Hrimhari's uncle, Agamemnon, and kept prisoner until she gives birth orally. The newborn immediately kills Agamemnon, alarming Wolfsbane with his brutality. Her repulsion frightens her baby, who runs away and is later found and adopted by the werewolf Jack Russell.

Wolfsbane later feels immense remorse for abandoning her son and comes to fear that she will go to Hell for it. Siryn and Polaris take her to meet Father John Maddox, a duplicate of Jamie Madrox who has become a priest, who counsels her to let go of her self-pity and judgmental attitude and channel her negative energy into positivity. With a new outlook, Wolfsbane searches for and reunites with her son Tier, and decides to leave X-Factor Investigations to live peacefully with him and Jack Russell.

However, Wolfsbane and Tier are drawn back into conflict once more during the 2013 "Hell on Earth War" storyline. Tier's life becomes the focal point of a war for power among various rulers of Hell and he is ultimately killed by a soulless Strong Guy seeking to resurrect M. A devastated and spiritually lost Wolfsbane is teleported to Father John's church, where she becomes a deacon.

=== Secret Empire ===
Wolfsbane appears in X-Men Blue during the 2017 "Secret Empire" storyline, in which she joins a mutant strike force assembled to resist Hydra. After being exposed to the Mothervine drug by Emma Frost and Miss Sinister, she undergoes a secondary mutation that allows her to split her wolf form into five smaller wolves.

=== Dead Souls and Uncanny X-Men ===
Wolfsbane joins Magik's team of New Mutants in the 2018 limited series The New Mutants: Dead Souls. During the series, she forgives her teammate Strong Guy, who has since reclaimed his soul, for killing her son. She, along with Magik, Strong Guy, and Karma, is later infected with the transmode virus by Moonlock, the combined Mirage and Warlock. She and her infected teammates are acquired by the Office of National Emergency (O*N*E). While Moonlock, Strong Guy, and Karma are forced into service as Sentinel-like mutant hunters and killers, Wolfsbane and Magik are less affected by the virus and thus only imprisoned.

Wolfsbane and the other infected mutants are eventually freed from O*N*E by Cyclops and Wolverine and later cured of the virus. Wolfsbane joins the X-Men and participates in the defense of New York during the 2019 "The War of the Realms" storyline. Later realizing she wants to live a normal civilian life, she quits the team. However, not long after, she is accosted by four young men who beat her to death upon realizing that she is a mutant. Her death is mourned by her former teammates.

=== Krakoan Age ===
After Krakoa is established as a mutant nation, Wolfsbane is resurrected by the Five. Appearing regularly in New Mutants (vol. 4) (2020–2023) and New Mutants Lethal Legion (2023), she rejoins the New Mutants and receives therapy for her past traumas from Mirage. When she questions why her son Tier has not been resurrected, the Five tell her that his revival is not possible, likely due to his Asgardian heritage, much to her despair. She later helps free Amahl Farouk from the lingering influence of the Shadow King and aids Magik in transferring the throne of Limbo to Madelyne Pryor.

== Powers and abilities ==
Wolfsbane (right) and Layla Miller (left) on the textless cover of X-Factor (vol. 3) #6 (June 2006). Art by Gabriele Dell'Otto and José Villarrubia.

Wolfsbane is a mutant with the ability to transform into a wolf at will, while retaining her human intelligence, or into a transitional form which combines human and lupine aspects. While this ability is similar to lycanthropy, it is not magical in nature, but instead a complex biological function involving the mutant X-gene. She can change into a humanoid lupine form resembling a werewolf, or become an actual wolf. In either form, Wolfsbane has enhanced senses of hearing, sight, and smell (similar to those of a wolf's, but also superior to them); animal-like strength, agility, and reflexes; razor-sharp talons and fangs; and bestial instincts. In her lupine form, she can see into the infrared and ultraviolet portions of the electromagnetic spectrum, thereby enabling her to perceive heat patterns and to see in the dark. She can also hear sounds and detect scents outside the normal human range. In her transitional form, Wolfsbane is stronger than she is in human form (though less agile than she is as a wolf), capable of speech, able to use her forepaws as hands, and easily stand erect, and at least some of her senses remain superhumanly acute. Mirage's powers, which enable her to communicate with animals, allow her to communicate telepathically with Wolfsbane to a limited degree when she is in her lupine form or transitional form; in her lupine form, Wolfsbane may have more difficulty understanding complex human concepts. Wolfsbane later learns to enter different transitional forms which vary slightly in appearance. In her "absolute" lupine form, she possesses superhuman strength and durability. She possesses regenerative abilities which allow her to recover from injuries in a few days which would incapacitate a normal human for weeks or months.

Wolfsbane's human form is normal in appearance, originally with the exception that her hair never grew more than a few centimeters long; this limitation has since been removed by a temporary biological change into a "mutate" by the Genengineer on the island of Genosha. The artificial mutation process Wolfsbane underwent caused her to act with animalistic savagery in her lupine and "absolute" forms. Wolfsbane is shown to exhibit her keen sense of smell while in human form, sensing traces of blood and spit on teammate Strong Guy's hand (identifying who the fluids belonged to), despite him having already wiped it clean. This is followed by Siryn's sonic-scream, leaving Wolfsbane's "doggy-ears...ringing for a week" implying her hearing is also enhanced in human form. Wolfsbane mentions to Rictor that she indeed has her wolf senses in her human form but changes the subject before explaining further.

While a member of X-Factor, Wolfsbane wears a special uniform made of "unstable molecules" that converts to a collar in her non-human forms.

After Elixir alters her DNA in order for her to survive her pregnancy, Wolfsbane demonstrates greatly increased superhuman strength and durability to the point of being bulletproof. Her senses are further heightened to the point that she is able to smell a missing teammate nearly a mile away and underground. After giving birth to her child, these enhanced abilities fade and she returns to her original levels of strength and durability.

After exposure to the Mothervine drug, Wolfsbane gains the ability to split her wolf form into five smaller wolves.

== Reception ==
- In 2014, Entertainment Weekly ranked Wolfsbane 50th in their "Let's rank every X-Man ever" list.
- In 2018, Comic Book Resources (CBR) ranked Wolfsbane 18th in their "20 Most Powerful Mutants From The '80s" list, and 17th in their "X-Force: 20 Powerful Members" list.

== Other versions ==
=== Age of Apocalypse ===
In the alternate timeline of the 1995–1996 "Age of Apocalypse" storyline, Wolfsbane finds herself stuck in her lupine form and is a companion of Dark Beast. When this reality was revisited ten years later in X-Men: Age of Apocalypse (May–June 2005), Wolfsbane has been rescued and has begun to rediscover her humanity. She is now capable of shifting into her hybrid form but is still very feral in her mindset.

=== Age of X ===
In the alternate reality seen in the 2011 "Age of X" storyline, Wolfsbane is briefly sheltered from the government by the Fantastic Four, but her presence is betrayed by the Invisible Woman after she accidentally attacks Franklin Richards, resulting in all of the team but Invisible Woman being arrested.

=== Days of Future Past ===
An alternate future version of Wolfsbane from the timeline originated by the 1981 "Days of Future Past" storyline appears in Excalibur #94 (February 1996). She, along with a few surviving friends, participates in a raid on a Black Air facility.

=== Mutant X ===
In the alternate reality of the 1998–2001 series Mutant X, Wolfsbane works alongside many of her New Mutant counterparts, making a living as thieves, living in the sewers and calling themselves "Marauders."

=== MyS-TECH Wars ===
An alternate universe version of Wolfsbane, along with alternates of her X-Factor teammates, appears in MyS-TECH Wars #3 (May 1993) to fight alongside the heroes of the mainstream continuity. She does not survive the battle that follows.

=== Ultimate Marvel ===
An alternate universe version of Wolfsbane appears in the Ultimate Marvel imprint. She makes minor appearances in Ultimate X-Men issues #43 (May 2004) and #50 (October 2004) before being introduced in issue #95 (August 2008). This version of the character is a member of Alpha Flight who utilizes the power-enhancing Banshee drug to assume a sasquatch-like form. She is injured by Nightcrawler, who, while trying to teleport her away, severs half of her right arm.

=== What If...? ===
Wolfsbane appears in some What If...? stories:

- In "What If... the New X-Men Died on Their Very First Mission?", a preteen Rahne joins Moira MacTaggert on a journey to look after Moira's old lover, Charles Xavier, following another severe punishment at the hands of Reverend Craig. Meeting Beast, they learn of the X-Men's secret and their deaths on Krakoa. They remain at the Xavier institute to look after the Professor, who has grown despondent over the loss of his students. When Count Nefaria and his Ani-Men attempt to blackmail the United States government, Beast hastily assembles a team to engage them, but Rahne is accidentally taken along as well. When Beast's team is brought into dire straits by the Ani-Men, Xavier telepathically awakens Rahne's latent powers, which allows her to rescue her friends. Rahne joins the newly formed X-Men as a "charter member".
- In "What If... the X-Men Had Stayed in Asgard?", Wolfsbane's actions diverge from those she committed at the end of X-Men Annual #9 (December 1985), deciding that she cannot be separated from Hrimhari. Although Hrimhari later dies in battle, he leaves her with three children (depicted as a wolf cub, a human baby, and a wolf-human hybrid baby) and rulership over his people.

=== Wolverine: Rahne of Terra ===
An alternate reality version of Wolfsbane, named Rain, appears prominently in the 1991 graphic novel Wolverine: Rahne of Terra. She is the princess of the magical realm of Geshem and is prophesied to be consumed by a "Beast" on her sixteenth birthday. To save her from this fate, the Mage (Cable's counterpart) casts a spell that causes Rain to switch realities with Wolfsbane and alters the memories of both into believing they are the other. The spell is less potent outside of Geshem, however, and fails to maintain Rain's altered memory. She spends most of the novel restrained and under observation by the New Mutants, who believe her to be Wolfsbane suffering from a form of psychosis. Eventually, Wolfsbane's true memories are restored and it is ultimately revealed that the prophecy was misinterpreted and was actually a metaphor for the manifestation of Rain's royal bond with the wild magic of the land itself (the so-called Beast) within her, granting her powers similar to Wolfsbane's. Wolfsbane and Rain return to their respective realities and Rain becomes queen of Geshem. She later marries the peasant Doug (Cypher's counterpart).

In the 1995 sequel, Wolverine: Knight of Terra, it is revealed that Rain's bond with the Beast was suppressed as a result of her time away from Geshem. The Beast, yearning to be free, induces unpredictable fits of feral rage in her. Eventually, her bond with the Beast grows so weak that it manifests outside of her, possesses an unnamed man (Sabretooth's counterpart), and goes on a murderous rampage to kill Rain and conquer Geshem. Rain again switches realities with Wolfsbane, this time as part of a plan by the Shaman (Professor X's counterpart) to protect her. While Wolfsbane and Wolverine battle the Beast, Professor X helps Rain embrace the Beast within herself and reestablish her bond with Geshem's wild magic. Rain returns to Geshem and in doing so weakens the rogue Beast enough that it can be killed. Before Wolfsbane and Wolverine return home, Rain makes Wolfsbane a peer of the realm and Wolverine a knight.

=== X-Men: The End ===
In the alternate future of X-Men: The End, Wolfsbane is one of the staff at the X-Mansion. When Skrulls impersonating old X-Men enemies attack the mansion, Wolfsbane sacrifices herself to save many of the surviving children, making brief telepathic contact with and thus awakening the comatose Dani Moonstar as she dies.

== In other media ==
=== Television ===
- Wolfsbane appears in the X-Men: The Animated Series episode "Cold Comfort" as a member of the government-sponsored team X-Factor.
  - Wolfsbane appears in X-Men '97, voiced by Jennifer Hale.
- Wolfsbane appears in X-Men: Evolution, voiced by Chantal Strand. This version is a member of the X-Men's junior team, the New Mutants.
- Wolfsbane makes non-speaking cameo appearances in Wolverine and the X-Men.

=== Film ===
Rahne Sinclair appears in The New Mutants, portrayed by Maisie Williams in her human form, and by the trained wolf Chuck in her wolf form. This version enters a lesbian relationship with Danielle Moonstar over the course of the film.

=== Video games ===
- Wolfsbane appears as a playable character in Marvel Puzzle Quest.
- Wolfsbane appears as a playable character in Marvel Strike Force.

=== Miscellaneous ===
- Wolfsbane is discussed in the nonfiction book The Great Women Superheroes.
- Wolfsbane appears in the Wolverine versus Sabretooth motion comics, voiced by Kathleen Barr.
