= The New Mutants (graphic novel) =

1982 graphic novel published by Marvel

- Date: September 7, 1982
- Main characters: New Mutants
- Series: Marvel Graphic Novel
- Publisher: Marvel Comics

Creative team
- Writer: Chris Claremont
- Artist: Bob McLeod
- Letterer: Tom Orzechowski
- Colorist: Glynis Wein
- ISBN: 0-939766-20-5

The New Mutants is a graphic novel published in 1982 by Marvel Comics. Written by Chris Claremont and illustrated by Bob McLeod, it introduced a new team of characters as teenage counterparts to the team of superhero mutants, the X-Men. It returns to the premise of the original X-Men, which featured a group of students, while retaining the diversity in race and social background introduced to the X-Men by the second incarnation of the team. The New Mutants is the fourth publication of the Marvel Graphic Novel branding and the first spinoff of X-Men. It was followed by an ongoing series in 1983, also titled The New Mutants.

The graphic novel follows Professor X, the leader of the X-Men, as he gathers the New Mutants to protect them from the villain Donald Pierce. With Karma and Wolfsbane, Professor X goes to collect Psyche when they are attacked. Another mutant, Sunspot, is kidnapped along with his girlfriend, so Karma and Wolfsbane try to rescue them. Sunspot's girlfriend is killed in the ensuing fight. Cannonball, a teenage mutant hired by Pierce, kidnaps Professor X. The four New Mutants find where Pierce is holding Professor X, and they battle with Cannonball and Pierce. After Pierce is defeated, Cannonball defects and joins the New Mutants.

== Plot summary ==
Several teenage mutants from different parts of the world develop their superpowers. Rahne Sinclair (Wolfsbane) is shot by Reverend Craig in Scotland after he learns of her mutant ability of lycanthropy, but she is saved by Moira MacTaggert. Roberto da Costa (Sunspot) plays a championship football game in Brazil when another player attacks him for being half-black, but he transforms into an energy being and defends himself with superhuman strength, causing the spectators to panic. Sam Guthrie (Cannonball) is caught in a mine collapse in Kentucky when he discovers the power to propel himself with intense energy, rescuing one of his fellow workers.

Donald Pierce monitors the mutants with the intention of killing them. Danielle Moonstar of the Cheyenne in Colorado is told by her grandfather Black Eagle that she is to learn to control her ability to create psychic images under Professor X, but she protests due to her distrust of white people. That night, Pierce has her grandfather killed. At the Xavier School for Gifted Youngsters, Professor X has the Vietnamese refugee Xi'an Coy Manh (Karma) practice her mind control abilities on MacTaggert. Professor X is reluctant to take on new disciples, as the X-Men had recently been captured by an alien race and he fears they had died.

Professor X, Rahne, and Xi'an go to meet Moonstar and learn of Black Eagle's death. They are attacked by Pierce's armored soldiers, but Moonstar and Xi'an use their psychic abilities to stop them. Professor X uses his own powers to freeze Moonstar, preventing her from killing their defeated foes. MacTaggert, Rahne, and Xi'an then go to Brazil to find Roberto. Roberto and his girlfriend Juliana are held captive by cybernetic men, so Moonstar and Xi'an arrive to rescue them. Mistaking her for an enemy, Roberto activates his powers and strikes Xi'an. This releases her mind control over one of the cyborgs, who then shoots at Roberto. Juliana takes the bullet for him and dies. Meanwhile, Professor X is captured by Sam, who has been hired by Pierce.

In her wolf form, Rahne tracks Professor X's scent and enters the facility where he is held. Pierce holds Professor X captive with a device that can nullify his powers and read his mind. Sam attacks Rahne as Moonstar, Roberto, and Xi'an arrive. They confront Pierce, but he is resistant to the psychic attacks of Moonstar and Xi'an. Professor X breaks free during the fight and uses his stronger telepathic abilities to overpower Pierce's mind. Two weeks later, the New Mutants try on their superhero uniforms. Sam arrives at Professor X's request so he can redeem himself by joining their team. Professor X finds himself hopeful for the first time since he lost the X-Men.

== Creation ==
The Uncanny X-Men had become one of Marvel's most popular series by the 1980s under writer Chris Claremont, but at the time it did not have any of the spin-off series that the franchise came to be known for. The editor-in-chief of Marvel Comics, Jim Shooter, wished to focus on the school aspect of the X-Men. The artist for the series, John Byrne, suggested a separate team of mutants. This team would play the role of students, while the existing X-Men would act as teachers. Claremont and editor Louise Jones did not want to create a new team of mutants, fearing it would detract from the novelty of the X-Men, but Shooter issued an ultimatum that either they create one or he would have someone else do it. Claremont and Jones referred to the series as the "X-Babies" while they worked on it. This nickname was dismissively used in the future by the character Kitty Pryde.

Bob McLeod was chosen as the penciller and inker for The New Mutants. He was a new artist at the time, having done some penciling jobs but never been the main pencil for a series. After penciling X-Men #151 and #152, Claremont and Jones offered that he could become the series' main penciller, or he could co-create The New Mutants, which at the time had not been developed or titled. He chose the latter. Glynis Oliver was taken on as the colorist, and Tom Orzechowski as the letterer.

The New Mutants was originally intended to be a standard comic book, and McLeod began drawing a 22-page issue. When he was approximately half way done, the plan was changed and he was instead to produce a 50-page graphic novel on a stricter time schedule. The process was even more challenging because it coincided with McLeod's wedding and honeymoon.

== Themes and characterization ==
By the time The New Mutants was written, there had been two iterations of the X-Men: the team of mutant students introduced in the 1960s, and the later team of mutant adults that was primarily a superhero team. The New Mutants drew heavily from the 1960s team, featuring teenage characters still learning to use their powers, and McLeod depicted the team in the costumes of the original X-Men. Even the team's name was devised as a play on Stan Lee's original name for the X-Men, "The Mutants". However, the plot of the graphic novel mirrors that of Giant Size X-Men #1, the first appearance of the newer X-Men lineup: Professor X locates and recruits the members of the new team one-by-one as their mutant powers reveal them to the people of their respective homelands, then leads them against a new menace.

The team is differentiated from all of the previous X-Men in that their story had them grouped primarily to learn about using their powers rather than specifically as a superhero team. The New Mutants incorporated an element of teenage angst that had yet to appear in X-Men.

One element retained from the newer X-Men was the team's diversity, with different members of the team coming from different cultures. The characters of The New Mutants were drawn from different countries, age groups, classes, religions, and world views. This builds on the social commentary seen in X-Men, combining the stigma against mutants faced by the characters with the problems faced by real-life marginalized groups. The New Mutants presents these issues as something that can be surmounted by using anger and a sense of injustice as a means to motivate oneself and do good.

McLeod proposed that the majority of the team should be women. According to McLeod, he liked drawing female characters and Claremont was well-known for writing female characters, so he felt that they should use this to avoid tokenism common among comic book portrayals of women. Of the characters who appeared in the new team, Xi'an Coy Manh was the only one to be introduced prior to The New Mutants, having first appeared in Marvel Team-Up #100 (1980) by Claremont and artist Frank Miller.

== Publication and legacy ==
The New Mutants was released as the fourth publication of the Marvel Graphic Novel series, which featured longer stories printed on higher quality paper than that of standard comic books. The story in the graphic novel was titled "Renewal" and was set after The Uncanny X-Men #161 (September 1982), in which the X-Men were presumed dead.

Claremont and McLeod began working on an ongoing series for the team, also titled The New Mutants, immediately after finishing the graphic novel. It debuted in 1983. The New Mutants franchise allowed Marvel to compete with the DC Comics publication The New Teen Titans. As the characters became adults in the 1990s, the New Mutants disbanded as its members left, died, or joined other X-Men spinoff teams. The niche created by The New Mutants was replaced by Generation X. The New Mutants was reprinted in the 2006 collection New Mutants Classic.
