= Externals =

Fictional comic book characters

Publication information
- Publisher: Marvel Comics
- First appearance: X-Force #10 (May 1992)
- Created by: Rob Liefeld; Fabian Nicieza; Mark Pacella

Characteristics
- Notable members: Absalom; Burke; Candra; Crule; Gideon; Nicodemus; Saul; Selene; Apocalypse
- Inherent abilities: Immortality

The Externals are a group of fictional characters appearing in American comic books published by Marvel Comics. Considered a rare subspecies of mutants, most of them were X-Men antagonists. The original, unused name for the group was to be The Prophets, as seen on the back of the Sunspot & Gideon trading card included with X-Force #1. The characters first appeared in X-Force #10 (May 1992).

== Fictional character biography ==
The Externals are mutants who share the ability of immortality. As expressed by Cable, they play an important role in Apocalypse's rise to power in at least one future. All of the Externals share a psychic link that allows them to sense each other's whereabouts and summon other Externals at will from great distances. Saul, Absalom, Gideon, Nicodemus, Burke, Selene, Candra, and Crule form the self-fashioned "High Lords", bent on playing power games and manipulating events behind the scenes.

Each External is claimed to represent an intangible concept: Absalom represents despair, Burke represents fortitude, Candra represents guile, Crule represents ferocity, Gideon represents opportunity, Nicodemus represents wisdom, Saul represents patience, Selene represents corruption, and Apocalypse represents evolution.

Following the creation of a mutant nation on Krakoa, Apocalypse summons the Externals to the Eternal Caldera, revealing his intentions to sacrifice some of their life energy to power the Arak Maw Gate. Selene, Gideon, and Absolom are revealed to be a part of his plan and quickly turn on their fellow immortals. With the help of Rictor, the group wipes out four of the Externals and extracts their life energy to fuel the gateway to Arakko.

== In other media ==
- Saul and Gideon make a non-speaking appearance in the X-Men: The Animated Series episode "Sanctuary".
- Candra appears in X-Men '97, voiced by Debra Wilson.
