= Bob McLeod (comics) =

Artist

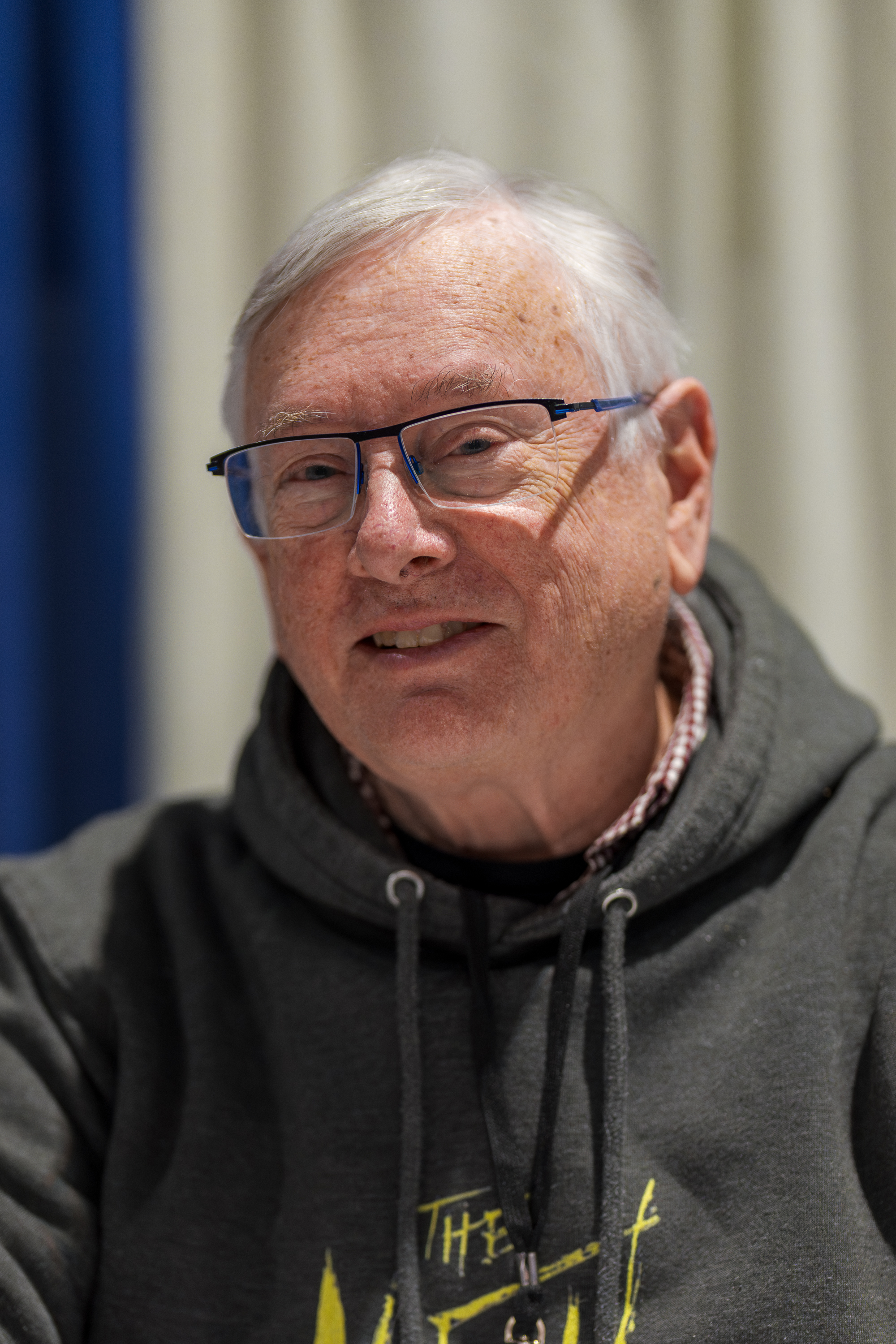
- McLeod at GalaxyCon Richmond in 2026
- Born: August 9, 1951 (age 75) Tampa, Florida, U.S.
- Areas: Penciller, Inker
- Notable works: New Mutants

Bob McLeod (born August 9, 1951) is an American comics artist best known for co-creating the New Mutants with writer Chris Claremont.

== Early life ==
McLeod was born in Tampa, Florida. He was educated at Auburn University and The Art Institute of Fort Lauderdale.

== Career ==
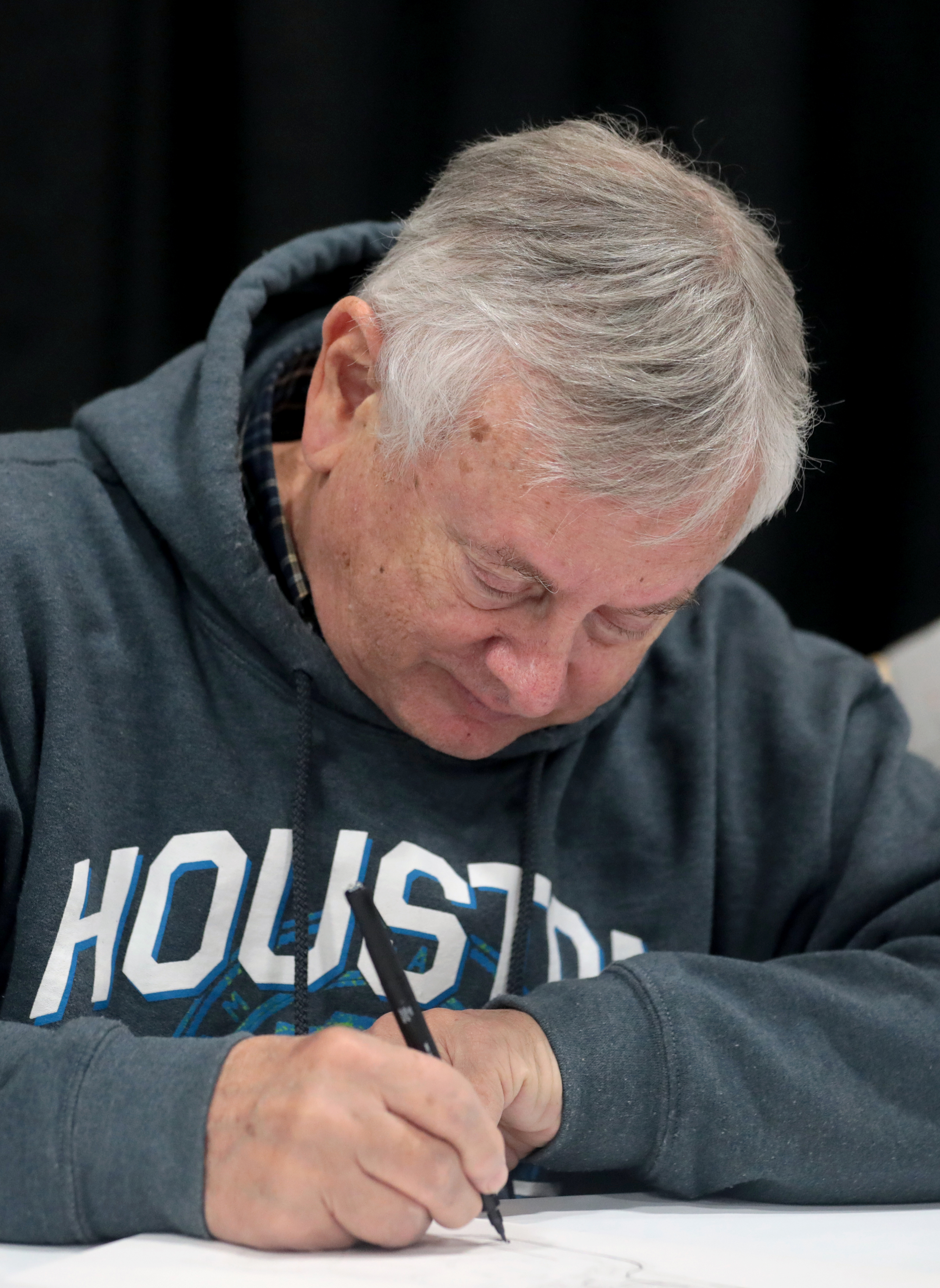
McLeod at the 2022 Phoenix Fan Fusion

Bob McLeod began his career working in the production department of Marvel Comics in 1973 on a recommendation from Neal Adams. He began penciling and inking for Marvel's Crazy Magazine, doing several movie satires and the "Teen Hulk" strip. He was a member of The Crusty Bunkers inkers while working at Adams' Continuity Studios, and he became an inker at Marvel and DC Comics on many series, including The Incredible Hulk, Conan the Barbarian, Legion of Super Heroes, Detective Comics, Wonder Woman, and The New Titans, as well as penciling Star Wars and several Spider-Man fill-ins for Marvel.

McLeod drew the graphic novel and the first three issues of New Mutants and inked a number of subsequent issues. The graphic novel's production overlapped with his honeymoon. The title ended up missing its shipping slot because editor Louise Simonson chose to keep her promise to McLeod that he could ink it himself. In a 2008 interview, McLeod looked back on The New Mutants as "one of the most frustrating experiences of my career", recounting having to ink the graphic novel while on his honeymoon and later give up doing pencils on the regular series because he could not keep up with the monthly pace at the time and felt he was producing substandard work. In 1987, he inked Mike Zeck's pencils on the "Kraven's Last Hunt" storyline in the Spider-Man titles. At DC Comics, he was the artist on Superman in Action Comics in the early 1990s including the "Dark Knight Over Metropolis" story arc. McLeod helped writer Louise Simonson and artist Jon Bogdanove launch a new Superman title, Superman: The Man of Steel in July 1991. With writer Roger Stern, McLeod contributed to such Superman tales as the 1991 story wherein Clark Kent finally revealed his identity as Superman to Lois Lane and the "Panic in the Sky" crossover in 1992.

There were several issues of The Phantom comic book drawn by McLeod for the Swedish publisher Egmont. He has written and illustrated a children's book, Superhero ABC, which was published by HarperCollins in 2006 and received starred reviews from School Library Journal and ABA Booklist. He also edited TwoMorrows Publishing's Rough Stuff magazine which featured interviews and art by top creators in the comics field. McLeod also taught part-time at the Pennsylvania College of Art and Design in Lancaster, Pennsylvania, and currently works on various commercial projects.

McLeod was the keynote speaker for the 2012 Inkwell Awards Awards Ceremony at HeroesCon. In 2018, McLeod received the Inkwell Awards Joe Sinnott Hall of Fame Award for his many years of inking.

== Bibliography ==
=== Atlas/Seaboard ===
- Wulf the Barbarian #2 (inker, among others) (1975)

=== Dark Horse Comics ===
- Comics' Greatest World #16 (artist, with Lee Weeks) (1993)

=== DC Comics ===
- Action Comics #650 (inker), 653–656, 659–664, 668–670, 672–675 (penciller/artist) (1990–1992)
- Action Comics vol. 2 #8, 12 (inker) (2012)
- Adventures of Superman #480 (penciller, among others), Annual #2, 4 (artist) (1990–1992)
- Aquaman #61–62 (inker) (1978)
- The Batman Chronicles #12 (inker) (1998)
- Batman Secret Files #1 (inker) (1997)
- Birds of Prey: Revolution #1 (inker) (1997)
- The Brave and the Bold #137 (inker) (1977)
- The Brave and the Bold vol. 3 #13 (inker) (2008)
- Catwoman #49 (inker) (1997)
- Detective Comics #678, 712–713, 717–719 (inker) (1994–1998)
- DC Special Series #1, 6 (inker) (1977)
- Firestorm #2–3, 5 (inker) (1978)
- House of Mystery #258 (inker) (1978)
- Iron Lantern #1 (inker) (1997)
- Jemm, Son of Saturn #6, 8–12 (inker) (1985)
- JLA #15 (inker) (1998)
- JSA 80-Page Giant 2011 #1 (inker) (2011)
- Justice Society of America #54 (inker) (2011)
- Karate Kid #12–13 (inker)(1978)
- Legends of the DC Universe 80-Page Giant #1 (artist) (1998)
- Legends of the DCU: Crisis on Infinite Earths #1 (inker) (1999)
- Man of Steel Prequel: Special Edition #1 (inker, among others) (2013)
- New Gods #15 (inker) (1977)
- The New Titans #50–53, 57–61, 63 (inker) (1988–1990)
- Nightwing Annual #1 (inker) (1997)
- Psyba-Rats #1–3 (inker) (1995)
- Secret Society of Super Villains #9, 12 (inker) (1977–1978)
- Showcase '93 (Nightwing and Robin) #11–12 (artist) (1993)
- Star Spangled War Stories #204 (inker) (1977)
- Superboy vol. 3 #73 (inker) (2000)
- Superboy and the Legion of Super-Heroes #236, 240–242 (inker) (1978)
- Superman vol. 2 #39 (inker), #57 (penciller, among others) (1990–1991)
- Superman 80-Page Giant #1 (artist) (1999)
- Superman Plus Legion of Superheroes #1 (inker) (1997)
- Superman: The Man of Steel #1 (artist, among others), #17 (inker) (1991–1992)
- Superman: The Wedding Album #1 (inker, among others) (1996)
- Team Superman Secret Files #1 (penciller) (1998)
- Wonder Woman vol. 2 #20–22, 139–149, Annual #1 (inker) (1988–1999)

=== Egmont ===
- Fantomen (The Phantom) #24/2003, 11/2004, 1/2005, 9/2005, 21/2005, 12/2006 (artist) (2003–2006)

=== Future Comics ===
- Freemind #2 (artist), #3–5 (inker) (2002–2003)

=== Gold Key Comics ===
- Boris Karloff Tales of Mystery #75 (artist) (1977)
- Grimm's Ghost Tales #41 (artist) (1977)
- The Twilight Zone #76–77 (artist) (1977)

=== Marvel Comics ===
- Adventure into Fear #29 (inker) (1975)
- Alpha Flight Annual #2 (inker) (1987)
- The Amazing Spider-Man #183, 187, 209 (inker), #220, 267 (artist), #270, 293–294, 298–299 (inker) (1978–1988)
- The Amazing Spider-Man: Soul of the Hunter #1 (inker) (1992)
- Astonishing Tales #32 (Deathlok) (inker) (1975)
- Bizarre Adventures #25 (inker) (1981)
- Blade: Vampire Hunter #6 (inker) (2000)
- Cable #24 (inker) (1995)
- Captain America #332 (inker) (1987)
- Captain Marvel #58 (inker) (1978)
- Chaos War #5 (inker) (2011)
- Classic X-Men #37 (inker) (1989)
- Conan the Barbarian #119–126 (inker, over John Buscema layouts) (1981)
- Crazy Magazine #5, 27, 37, 63, 65–66, 81–85, 88 (artist) (1974–1981)
- Deadpool #2 (inker) (1994)
- Deadly Hands of Kung Fu #5–7 (inker) (1974)
- Defenders #24, 54 (inker) (1975–1977)
- Domination Factor: Fantastic Four #1–4 (inker) (1999–2000)
- Eternals: The Herod Factor #1 (inker) (1991)
- Frankenstein #16–17 (inker) (1975)
- Ghost Rider #80 (inker) (1996)
- Ghost Rider: Crossroads #1 (inker) (1995)
- G.I. Joe #1, 59 (inker) (1982–1987)
- Hulk! #13–15 (inker), #21 (artist) (1979–1980)
- The Incredible Hulk vol. 2 #228, 325, 369–372, 374–377 (inker) (1978–1991)
- Iron Man: The Iron Age #1–2 (inker) (1998)
- Howard the Duck #5–6 (inker) (1980)
- John Carter, Warlord of Mars #18 (inker) (1978)
- Jungle Action #18–22 (inker) (1975–1976)
- Ka-Zar vol. 2 #7 (inker, over John Buscema layouts) (1975)
- Marvel Fanfare #3 (inker) (1982)
- Marvel Graphic Novel #4 (New Mutants) (artist) (1982)
- Marvel Premiere #23 (inker) (1975)
- Marvel Presents #1 (inker) (1975)
- Marvel Preview #18 (inker) (1979)
- Marvel Spotlight #24 (inker) (1975)
- Marvel Super-Heroes vol. 2 #14 (Iron Man) (penciller) (1993)
- Marvel Team-Up #86 (artist), #90, 100 (inker) (1979–1980)
- Marvel Treasury Edition #27 (inker), #28 (inker, among others) (1980)
- Marvel Two-in-One #51 (inker) (1979)
- Micronauts #8 (inker) (1979)
- Moon Knight #35 (artist) (1984)
- Ms. Marvel #19 (inker) (1978)
- The 'Nam #7 (inker) (1987)
- New Mutants #1–3 (penciller), #4–5, 7–8, 75 (inker), Annual #1 (artist), #4 (inker) (1983–1989)
- New Mutants Forever #1–5 (inker) (2010–2011)
- Nova #21 (over John Buscema layouts) (1978)
- Official Handbook of the Marvel Universe #2, 5, 6–9, 11–14 (penciller) (1983–1984)
- Power Pack #20 (artist) (1986)
- Powerline #1 (inker) (1988)
- Saga of the Submariner #1–4, 6–7, 9–12, (inker) (1988–1989)
- Savage Sword of Conan #63 (inks and gray tones, pp. 45–50) (1981), #149 (inker) (1988)
- Solo Avengers #2 (inker) (1988)
- The Spectacular Spider-Man #113 (artist), 115–119, 121, 131–132 (inker), #189 (artist) (1986–1992)
- Spider-Man #32–34 (artist), #50 (inker) (1993–1994)
- Spider-Man: Hobgoblins Lives #3 (inker) (1997)
- Spider-Man: Redemption #1–4 (inker) (1996)
- Spider-Man Team-Up #3, 6 (artist/penciller) (1996–1997)
- Spider-Man: The Mysterio Manifesto #1–3 (inker) (2001)
- Spider-Man Unlimited #7 (penciller) (1994)
- Spider-Verse Team-Up #1 (artist) (2015)
- Spitfire and the Troubleshooters #2, 4 (inker) (1986–1987)
- Star Wars #83 (artist), #85–86, 88, 90 (penciller) (1984)
- Strange Tales vol.2 #18 (inker) (1988)
- Thunderbolts #100 (among other artists), Annual '97 (penciller, among others) (1997, 2006)
- Tomb of Dracula #1, 5 (inker) (1979–1980)
- Uncanny X-Men #94 (inker), 151 (penciller), #152 (penciller), Annual #4, '95 (inker) (1975–1995)
- Untold Tales of Spider-Man #24 (artist), #25 (inker) (1997)
- Venom: Enemy Within miniseries #1–3 (artist/penciller) (1994)
- Web of Spider-Man #11 (artist), #12, 19–20, 31–32, 93 (inker) (1986–1992)
- Webspinners: Tales of Spider-Man #17–18 (inker) (2000)
- What If? #29 (Namor) (inker) (1981)
- What if? vol. 2 #10 (inker) (1990)
- What The--?! #3 (inker) (1988)
- Wolverine vol. 2 #82, 83 (artist) (1994)
- X-Factor #6 (inker) (1986)
- X-Men: Gold #1 (artist) (2014)
- X-Men vs. The Avengers #4 (inker) (1987)
- X-Men Unlimited #9 (inker) (1995)

=== Pacific Comics ===
- Bold Adventures #1 (artist) (1983)
- Vanguard Illustrated #2 (artist) (1984)

=== Tekno Comix ===
- Neil Gaiman's Mr. Hero - The Newmatic Man #1–3 (inker) (1995)

=== Tyndale House Publishers ===
- Tribulation Force #1, 3–4 (inker) (2002–2003)

=== Valiant Comics ===
- Turok: Dinosaur Hunter #31–33 (inker) (1995)
- Visitor #1, 4–5, 8 (inker) (1995)
