= Frigga (character) =

Marvel Comics character

- Frigga. Art by Greg Tocchini.

Publication information
- Publisher: Marvel Comics
- First appearance: Journey into Mystery #92 (May 1963)
- Created by: Stan Lee (Writer); Robert Bernstein (writer); Joe Sinnott (artist)

In-story information
- Full name: Freyja Freyrdottir
- Species: Asgardian
- Place of origin: Asgard
- Team affiliations: Asgard
- Notable aliases: Frigg; Freyja; Fricka

Frigga (sometimes called Freyja) is a fictional character appearing in American comic books published by Marvel Comics. The character appears in particular in those featuring the superhero Thor, who is Frigga's son. Based on both Frigg and Freyja of Norse mythology, she was created by writers Stan Lee and Robert Bernstein and artist Joe Sinnott, and first appeared in Journey into Mystery #92 (May 1963).

Rene Russo portrayed the character in the Marvel Cinematic Universe films Thor (2011), Thor: The Dark World (2013), and Avengers: Endgame (2019).

== Publication history ==
Frigga first appeared in Journey into Mystery #92 (May 1963), and was adapted from mythology by Stan Lee, Robert Bernstein and Joe Sinnott.

The character subsequently appeared in Thor Annual #10 (1982), Thor #344 (June 1984), Marvel Graphic Novel #15 - The Raven Banner (1985), Journey into Mystery #504-505 (Dec. 1996-Jan. 1997), #512-513 (Sept.–Oct. 1997), Thor #26 (Aug. 2000), Loki #3 (Jan. 2004), and Thor: Son of Asgard #7&9 (Aug. 2004-Oct. 2004).

Frigga appeared as part of the "Asgardians" entry in The Official Handbook of the Marvel Universe Deluxe Edition #1.

== Fictional character biography ==
An Asgardian, she is both Queen of Asgard, and the Asgardian gods, the wife of Odin, the step-mother of Thor, the biological mother of Balder, and the adoptive mother of Loki. She is also sometimes described to be a Vanir goddess, as opposed to her husband, who is of the Aesir tribe. She is also the one responsible for casting spells on Balder to protect him from mortal harm. When Surtur the fire demon threatens all the known realms, Frigga is assigned the guardianship of the children of Asgard. They retreat to a hostel deep in the wilderness of Asgard. Though Frigga does not know it, she is assisted in her guarding by Tiwaz, the great-grandfather of Thor. After Odin and Surtur disappear, Frigga organizes an 'Althing', where all of Asgard will choose a new ruler. The result is that Balder is chosen as the new ruler.

Frigga supervised the location and training of the apprentices to the Celestials, the Young Gods. Because of the events of Ragnarok, Frigga is believed to have suffered the same fate as the rest of the Asgardians.

During the "War of the Realms" storyline, Frigga assists in the battle against Malekith's forces and makes Jane Foster the All-Mother of Asgard. Frigga leads Blade, She-Hulk, Ghost Rider, and Punisher, all posing as Asgardian creatures, to destroy the Dark Bifrost. Frigga's group arrives at the Dark Bifrost Bridge, but Frigga realizes that the Bifröst has been destroyed and changes plans in protecting the Dark Bifrost. Malekith attacks Frigga, but he is fended off by Odin. Odin destroys the Dark Bifrost, apparently killing himself and Frigga in the process. Frigga and Odin survive and are held captive by Malekith at Stonehenge.

== In other media ==
Rene Russo as Frigga in the Marvel Studios film, Thor.

=== Television ===
- Frigga appears in The Super Hero Squad Show episode "Lo, How the Mighty Hath Abdicated!", voiced by Grey DeLisle.
- Frigga appears in the Avengers Assemble episode "Downgraded", voiced by Jennifer Hale. This version is the leader of the Vanir.

=== Film ===
Frigga appears in live-action films set in the Marvel Cinematic Universe, portrayed by Rene Russo. This version is Thor's biological mother.

- Frigga is introduced in Thor (2011).
- Russo reprises her role in Thor: The Dark World (2013). Following Loki's imprisonment, Frigga shows sympathy to him by attempting to make his incarceration more hospitable. During the Dark Elves' raid on Asgard, Frigga is killed by Algrim while protecting Jane Foster, and is later given a Viking funeral.
- An alternate timeline variant of Frigga appears in Avengers: Endgame. Thor tries to warn her about her impending death, but she refuses to hear it, saying that she accepts her future and he should focus on fixing his.
- An alternate universe variant of Frigga appears in the What If...? episode "What If... Thor Were an Only Child?", voiced by Josette Eales.

=== Video games ===
Frigga appears in Marvel Snap.

=== Miscellaneous ===
Frigga appears in Thor & Loki: Blood Brothers, voiced by Deborah Jane McKinley.
