= Elves (Marvel Comics) =

Fictional characters

- Grendell the Dark Elf on the cover of The Mighty Thor #377 (March 1987). Art by Walt Simonson.

Publication information
- Publisher: Marvel Comics
- First appearance: Thor #344 (June 1984)
- Created by: Various

In-story information
- Place of origin: Asgard

There are many fictional Elves appearing in American comic books published by Marvel Comics. The most common of the Elves are the Dark Elves of Svartalfheim and the Light Elves of Alfheim that are based on the elves of Norse mythology. They frequently appear in stories featuring the superhero Thor.

The Dark Elves appeared in the 2013 Marvel Studios film Thor: The Dark World and a Light Elf appeared in the 2022 series She-Hulk: Attorney at Law.

== Publication history ==
Bright-Elves first appeared in Thor #277 (November 1978) and were created by Roy Thomas, John Buscema and Tom Palmer. None of the small crowd of Bright-Elves who appear in that issue are named.

Dark Elves first appeared in Thor #344 (June 1984) and were originally created by Walt Simonson. The only Dark Elf to appear in that first issue was Malekith the Accursed. Algrim the Strong / Kurse and Wormwood later appeared in Thor #347 (September 1984), once again created by Walt Simonson. Grendell and Bitterhand appeared in Thor #377 (March 1987), and were created by Walt Simonson and Sal Buscema. Alflyse first appeared in Incredible Hercules #129 (October 2009), and was created by Greg Pak, Fred Van Lente, and Reilly Brown.

Light Elves first appeared in Alpha Flight #50 (September 1987) and were created by Bill Mantlo and June Brigman. The Light Elf Aeltri and her son Hrinmeer the Flame first appeared in Thor Annual #18 (December 1993), and were created by Ron Marz and Tom Grindberg. A few subspecies of Light Elves have also been introduced.

Cat Elves first appeared in Alpha Flight #81 (February 1990), and were created by James Hudnall and John Calimee. Ice Elves first appeared in Thor #615 (November 2010), and were created by Matt Fraction and Pasqual Ferry.

== Fictional history ==
=== Elves of Asgard ===
==== Dark-Elves ====
The Dark Elves are ruled over by Malekith the Accursed; the most powerful amongst their ranks is Algrim. However, Algrim was betrayed by Malekith in a bid to kill Thor. Algrim was dropped into lava and though he survived, he was critically wounded. The Beyonder transformed Algrim into the monstrous Kurse.

==== Bright-Elves ====
The Bright-Elves first appeared in Thor when mortal cameraman Roger Norvell (who had acquired the powers of Thor) brings Sif away to a world far from Asgard. Once there, the duo are greeted by a crowd of humanoids who introduce themselves as the Ljos-Alfar (or Bright-Elves) and welcome the outsiders to their home, Alfheim. Norvell responds by claiming their land as his and knocks the entire welcoming party off their feet with his hammer.

==== Light-Elves ====
The Light Elves first appear in Alpha Flight when Loki lies to an ill and delusional Northstar and claims Northstar is one of them. This prompts Northstar to journey to Alfheim to reside there and abandon the rest of Alpha Flight.

==== Cat-Elves ====
A subspecies of the Light Elves called the Cat Elves are introduced when Northstar learns he has been deceived by Loki. These Elves are smaller than their brethren and use winged cats as steeds.

==== Ice-Elves ====
Another subspecies of the Light Elves called the Ice Elves were revealed when one of their palaces was wiped out by the Ano-Athox warlord Uthana Thoth. The Ice Elves reside in the frozen portion of Alfheim.

==== Santa's Elves ====
These magical Elves are descendants of the Light Elves and aid Santa Claus, a powerful mutant, in creating toys.

==== Smoke-Elves ====
During the "'Fear Itself" storyline, the Smoke Elves appear as servants of the Serpent.

=== Elves of Klarn ===
The Elves of Klarn are a race of Elves who reside on the floating Weirdworld island of Klarn. There was also a group of Savage Elves descended from the elves of Klarn who were not on Klarn when it was flung into the sky by the sorcerer Darklens.

== Powers and abilities ==
Dark elves possess gifted intellects, as well as superhuman strength, speed, stamina, durability, agility, and reflexes. They also all possess a vulnerability to iron.

Light elves also possess superhuman strength, speed, stamina, durability, agility, and reflexes. Additionally, they have a penchant for archery.

== Known Elves of Asgard ==
=== Known Light Elves ===
- Aelsa – Queen of Alfheim and of the Light Elves.
- Aeltri – A Light Elf who was kidnapped and raped by a Fire Demon and gave birth to Hrinmeer.
- Ayelah – A representative for Alfheim on the Congress of Worlds.
- Faradei – A Light Elf warrior who helped Thor.
- Hrinmeer the Flame – A Light Elf and Fire Demon hybrid, he was killed during Ragnarök.
- Ivory – Lord of Longrose Hall.
- Milkmane – A senator who represented the Light Elves of Alfheim on the Congress of Worlds.
- Peaseblossom – A delegate who negotiated a safe passage for Asgardia with the All-Mother.

=== Known Dark Elves ===
- Alflyse – Queen of Svartalfheim, she was killed by Malekith.
- Bitterhand – A servant of Malekith, he was killed by Freyja during the War of the Realms.
- Canker – The herald for the Council of the Unhallowed.
- Grendell – A half Dark Elf and son of "Big Mother", he was killed by Beowulf.
- Gutbeard Brothers – Warriors loyal to Malekith, they were killed by Thor.
- Jagrfelm – A physically deformed elf, he was a master weaponsmith and was killed by Malekith.
- Kurse (Algrim)
- Kraw – King of the Dark Elf, he waged war against the Trolls, Light Elves, Dwarves and Asgardians, but was replaced by Malekith.
- Mageth – An Empathic Dark Elf, she aided Steve Rogers.
- Malekith the Accursed
- Mazerot – The mother of Malekith, she was fed to her own War Dogs by her son due for her wrongdoing.
- Mirka – A warrior priestess from Svartalfheim, and a member of the E.R.F.E.I. all-stars basketball team.
- Rotjaw – A warrior loyal to Malekith, he was killed by Thor's goat.
- Scumtounge – A warrior loyal to Malekith and Senator at the Congress of Worlds.
- Snaggi – A Dark Elf and Giant hybrid, under the order of Malekith, she went after Iron Man, but was defeated.
- Sourfoot – A warrior loyal to Malekith, he sacrificed his owm wellbeing in order to help Malekith escape and was then mercy killed by Malekith.
- Swarmsuckle – A member of Queen Alflyse's court, he was killed by Malekith and his men.
- Terrana – A hunter, under the order of Malekith, she went after Iron Man and also retrieved the Bride's offspring.
- Waziria – A Dark Elf witch and former League of Realms member who was later transformed into the second Kurse.
- Wormsong – A knight loyal to Queen Alflyse, he was killed by Malekith and his men.
- Wormwood
- Xan – A philosopher warrior, under the order of Malekith, he went after Iron Man, but was defeated. He was killed by Malekith for his defeat.

=== Elves of Klarn ===
- Tyndall – An elf dragonmaster.
- Velanna – A female blonde elf who Tyndall befriends.

=== Elves of Otherworld ===
- Moondog – An elf native to both Britain and Otherworld. He alongside Captain Britain, Black Knight and Vortigen went to Otherworld in order to fight against Mordred and Necromon, but would be killed in the fight.
- Sundog – The uncle of Moondog.
- Jackdaw – A sidekick of Captain Britain, he was killed by Fury.

== In other media ==
=== Television ===
- The Dark Elves and Light Elves appear in The Avengers: Earth's Mightiest Heroes.
- The Dark Elves appear in the Hulk and the Agents of S.M.A.S.H. episode "For Asgard".
- The Light Elves appear in Marvel Super Hero Adventures: Frost Fight!. A group of Light Elves protect the property of Jolnir, who is known on Earth as Santa Claus and is depicted as the son of a Light Elf and Frost Giant.

=== Films ===
Algrim and the Dark Elves appear in Thor: Tales of Asgard. This version of the species was driven to near-extinction by the Frost Giants.

=== Marvel Cinematic Universe ===
- The Elves appear in the Marvel Cinematic Universe:
  - The Dark Elves appear in Thor: The Dark World, with Malekith portrayed by Christopher Eccleston and Algrim/Kurse portrayed by Adewale Akinnuoye-Agbaje. The Dark Elves, as with their enemies the Asgardians, are depicted as ancient astronauts and existed in the endless night of dark matter and dark energy that predated the universe. Their goal is to destroy the current universe and return existence to the primordial darkness from whence it came.
  - In Guardians of the Galaxy, an imprisoned Dark Elf appears as an exhibit in Taneleer Tivan's museum.
  - In Spider-Man: Homecoming, Phineas Mason uses Dark Elf technology salvaged from the Battle of Greenwich.
  - Runa, a Light Elf, appears in the She-Hulk: Attorney at Law episode "The People vs. Emil Blonsky", portrayed by Peg O'Keif.

=== Video games ===
- The Dark Elves appear as enemies in Marvel: Ultimate Alliance.
- The Dark Elves appear in Marvel: Avengers Alliance.
- The Dark Elves appear as enemies in Marvel Heroes.
