= Jane Foster =

Comic book character

- Jane Foster on the textless cover of Valkyrie: Jane Foster #6 (December 2019). Pictured clockwise from left: Foster as herself; as Valkyrie; as Thor. Art by Mahmud Asrar and Matthew Wilson.

Publication information
- Publisher: Marvel Comics
- First appearance: As Jane Foster: Journey into Mystery #84 (September 1962); As Thordis: What If? #10 (August 1978); As Thor: Thor #1 (October 2014); As Valkyrie: War of the Realms Omega #1 (July 2019)
- Created by: Stan Lee (writer/plotter); Larry Lieber (writer/scripter); Jack Kirby (artist)

In-story information
- Full name: Jane Foster
- Species: Human (access to Asgardian/Valkyrie attributes)
- Place of origin: Earth
- Team affiliations: Secret Avengers (Civil War); Thor Corps; Avengers; Valkyrior
- Notable aliases: Mighty Thor; Lady Thor; Valkyrie; Thor
- Abilities: As Thor / Thordis: Superhuman strength, stamina, durability, and speed; Abilities via Mjolnir: Dimensional transportation; Star creation / generation; Physical transformation; Weather manipulation; Electric manipulation; Flight; As Valkyrie: Asgardian/Valkyrie physiology granting superhuman strength, stamina, durability, speed, and vision; Access to Undrjarn, the shapeshifting weapon; Mediumship with the spirits of the dead; Mystical teleportation; Death perception; Flight

Jane Foster is a superhero appearing in American comic books published by Marvel Comics. Created by writers Stan Lee, Larry Lieber, and artist Jack Kirby, the character first appeared in Journey into Mystery #84 (September 1962). Jane Foster was introduced as a love interest of the superhero Thor Odinson until becoming a superhero in her own right.

For many years, Foster was a nurse, employed by Dr. Donald Blake, Thor's first mortal host, before becoming a doctor herself. Foster is later revealed to be deemed worthy to wield Thor's hammer Mjolnir when the former is no longer able. During this period, she adopts the mantle of Thor, and joins the Avengers. Foster's stint as Thor ends with the character sacrificing her life and the mantle reverting to the original Thor. After Brunnhilde and the rest of the Valkyrior are killed during "The War of the Realms" storyline, Foster takes up the mantle of Valkyrie.

Jane Foster has been described as one of Marvel's most notable and powerful female heroes. Since her original introduction in comics, the character has been featured in various other Marvel-licensed products, including video games, animated television series, and merchandise. Natalie Portman has portrayed Jane Foster in the Marvel Cinematic Universe.

== Publication history ==
Jane Foster first appeared in Journey into Mystery #84 (September 1962), and was created by plotter Stan Lee, scripter Larry Lieber and penciler Jack Kirby. Named "Jane Nelson" in her first two appearances, she went on to appear as the love interest of Dr. Donald Blake, the secret identity of the Norse god superhero Thor, in nearly every issue through #136 (Jan. 1967) of the title, by then renamed Thor.

Thor vol. 4, #1 (Oct. 2014): First appearance of Jane Foster as Thor. Cover art by Russell Dauterman and Frank Martin.

In October 2014, the fourth volume of Thor, writer Jason Aaron and artist Russell Dauterman in the first issue debuted a female character in the role of Thor after the classic hero is no longer able to wield Mjolnir. Aaron stated, "This is not She-Thor. This is not Lady Thor. This is not Thorita. This is Thor. This is the Thor of the Marvel Universe. But it's unlike any Thor we've ever seen before." In 2015, this Thor joined the Avengers in All-New All-Different Avengers FCBD (May 2015), which takes place in the aftermath of the "Secret Wars" storyline. In Thor vol. 4 #8 (May 2015), the identity of the woman was revealed to be Jane Foster. Aaron said, "It grew out of the idea of the previous Thor becoming unworthy, which was something I was always building toward. I liked the idea of dealing with his worthiness and the idea of what it means for a god to be worthy in the Marvel universe. You know, the god of thunder waking up every morning and looking at the hammer and not knowing if he's gonna be worthy to lift it. Then, of course, one day he should wake up and not be able to lift it. That opened the door for someone else to pick up the hammer and carry it around in his place. Really, the only character that was discussed was Jane." A second volume of The Mighty Thor by Aaron and Dauterman and again starring Jane Foster as Thor debuted as part of the All-New, All-Different Marvel initiative after the conclusion of "Secret Wars." The concept of Jane Foster gaining the powers of Thor had previously been explored in What If #10 (August 1978). Foster appeared in the 2015 original graphic novel Avengers: Rage of Ultron as a member of the Avengers.

Jane Foster reappears in the War of the Realms storyline, before taking up the mantle as the new Valkyrie in a new ongoing series titled "Jane Foster: Valkyrie." The series was written by Aaron in collaboration with other authors. One of those authors, Torunn Grønbekk, wrote a new comic in 2022, "Jane Foster & The Mighty Thor."

== Fictional character history ==
=== Early history ===
Jane Nelson, known by her more common name of Jane Foster, was a nurse for Dr. Donald Blake, eventually developing feelings for him and Thor, not knowing that they were one and the same. The love triangle went on for a while until Thor revealed his secret identity to Foster, which caused Odin to punish him though he was forgiven after saving Asgard, and in return Thor even took her to Asgard with him. There, Foster was briefly granted immortality and the power of gods, until she failed to pass the tests of courage set forth by Odin when she showed fear battling the monstrous Unknown. Odin then strips Foster of her new powers and returns her to Earth, with no memory of Thor or her time in Asgard, where she meets her new love Dr. Keith Kincaid, who resembles Blake. Meanwhile, in Asgard, Odin reunites Thor with his childhood love, Sif.

Foster and Thor remain separated for some time until Thor learns Foster had been manipulated into attempting suicide by an entity known as Fear and rushes to her hospital bedside. Sif, seeing Thor still has feelings for Foster, saves Foster's life by merging their life-forces. They soon are separated and Foster is exiled to a pocket dimension. Thor and Sif eventually rescue Foster and return her to Earth, where she marries Dr. Keith Kincaid.

=== Physician ===
Foster appears again in the second Thor volume; now a doctor herself, she is in a position of authority over several New York paramedics, including Jake Olsen. Unbeknownst to her, Jake and Thor have been merged, which creates many conflicts. In one instance, Olsen ignores medical orders and utilizes Thor's knowledge to perform a complicated procedure on a critically ill man.

Later, Foster becomes involved in a police case against Olsen, who is accused of stealing drugs. She also examines Jack Monroe, who stated that he sought her out due to her familiarity with superhuman patients. She later informed Monroe that he was dying due to the effects of the Super-Soldier Serum he had ingested as a youth.

During the 2006 "Civil War" storyline, Foster takes Captain America's side against the registration act and joins his resistance group, the Secret Avengers. She operates from S.H.I.E.L.D. safe-house number 23. She is also seen in issue 4, helping to assist a beaten Spider-Man.

=== Return ===
Shortly after divorcing her husband and subsequently losing custody of her child, Jimmy Kincaid, Foster hears rumors of the return of Dr. Donald Blake and Thor. Blake soon visits Foster at her work in a New York City hospital in search of Sif, whose spirit Blake mistakenly thought had been reborn in Foster since their spirits had been merged once before. Foster and Blake go on a date after an initially turbulent reunion. Foster discovers that Sif's spirit had been reborn in the body of a dying elderly cancer patient under her care. She alerts Blake and Thor manages to restore Sif just before the patient dies. Foster then travels to Broxton, Oklahoma, the site of the resurrected Asgard, and opens a medical practice with Donald Blake.

=== Cancer and becoming Thor ===
Following the deaths of her ex-husband and son in a car accident, Foster is diagnosed with breast cancer, and accepts an invitation from Thor to represent Midgard in the Congress of the Worlds on Asgard. She undergoes therapy but refuses all magical treatments.

During the 2014 "Original Sin" storyline, Nick Fury whispers an, at the time, unrevealed secret to Thor that causes him to lose the ability to wield Mjolnir. Soon afterwards, an unidentified woman picks up the hammer, taking possession of Thor's power as the new Goddess of Thunder, and fights Malekith the Accursed, Dario Agger, and Absorbing Man. Although Thor initially attempts to reclaim the hammer, he – referring to himself as 'Odinson' – relinquishes the name and role of Thor after witnessing her wield its power.

Angered that someone else is wielding Mjolnir, Odin and his brother Cul, the god of fear, send the Destroyer after the new Thor to retrieve the hammer, but Odinson and Freyja assemble an army of female superheroes to aid her. When the battle is over, Odinson asks Thor to reveal her face, but is interrupted by S.H.I.E.L.D. agent Roz Solomon, Odinson's last 'viable' suspect as the new Thor after all other possible candidates came to assist in the battle. Unbeknownst to Odinson, Mjolnir has given Foster the strength to fight as Thor while it is in her possession. However, Foster's use of Mjolnir has perpetuated her cancer as a result of the transformation process purging all toxins from her body, including the chemotherapy being used for her treatment, each time she transforms.

=== Secret Wars ===
During the 2015 "Secret Wars" storyline, Foster participates in the final battle between Earth-616 and Earth-1610 during its collision during the incursion event. She is one of the few survivors of the end of the extant Marvel Universe, boarding Reed Richards's "life raft". She and the other survivors are awakened eight years later, having been trapped in suspended animation. In the interim, Doctor Doom created a new universe, Battleworld, from the fragments of dead universes. Knowing the survivors represent the only hope of defeating Doom, Doctor Strange scatters Foster and the others to different parts of Battleworld. For this, Doom kills Strange and begins hunting the survivors. Foster infiltrated the Thor Corps, Doom's police force, and convinced a majority of them to revolt against Doom.

=== All-New All-Different Marvel ===
In the 2015–18 All-New All-Different Marvel branding, Foster remains in Asgardia as a representative of Midgard (Earth) in the Congress of Worlds, and as Thor, she remains a fugitive pursued by Cul. Odinson is considered missing. She becomes involved in the war between Svartalfheim, the realm of the Dark Elves, and Alfheim, the realm of the Light Elves and encounters several incarnations of Loki. After returning to Earth, Foster is taken into custody by two S.H.I.E.L.D. agents who suspect her to be Thor until she is bailed out by Agent Solomon.

=== All-New All-Different Avengers ===
Thor is also once again a member of the Avengers and appears in All-New All-Different Avengers. She appeared by chance in their encounter with Warbringer and subsequently agrees to help form a new official Avengers group. Her identity is unknown to her teammates until she is separated from the hammer when she is transferred a few days into the future by Kang the Conqueror, and Sam Wilson, the new Captain America, witnesses her as she reverts to her civilian form. He agrees to keep it secret, and offers her moral support during chemotherapy treatments.

As her condition worsens, Foster confesses her identity to Odinson and others. Foster who force her to stay in a hospital under observation by Doctor Strange despite Mangog attacking Asgard, as Strange determines that one more transformation into Thor will kill her. When Mangog proves too powerful, Foster transforms into Thor and confronts him, sacrificing Mjolnir – and thus her life – by binding Mangog and Mjolnir together with Gleipnir, the chain used to trap Fenris the wolf, and hurling both into the Sun. Knowing that she will die once the enchantment that turns her into Thor wears off, Foster kisses Odinson for a final time before expiring. Consumed by grief of Foster's loss, Odinson works to revive her as she hesitates at the gates of Valhalla. Upon Foster gaining his respect, Odin channels the powers of the God Tempest and assists Odinson into resurrecting Foster. In the aftermath of Mangog's defeat, Mjolnir is destroyed, but it is discovered after Foster hands Odinson an uru shard that he is now capable of wielding the metal again. Foster convinces Odinson to reclaim his name and continue in the War Between the Realms as the true Thor while she resolves to focus on her chemotherapy.

=== Becoming a Valkyrie ===
When the "War of the Realms" comes to Earth, Foster assists in getting refugees to safety, with her chemotherapy successfully concluded and her hair now growing back. During the invasion she meets Valkyrie and Frigga, confirming that she was the Thor who defeated Mangog. When a new assault requires Odin and Frigga to retreat to Asgard with various Earth heroes, Frigga appoints Foster to act as All-Mother while she and Odin help to prepare the counter-attack to protect Earth. As the war continues, Brunnhilde and the rest of the Valkyrior are massacred by Malekith and his forces. Foster later takes the broken hammer of the Earth-1610 Thor in order to help fight Malekith's forces. Acting as a Thor one last time, she joins Thor Odinson, young Thor, and future King Thor to rescue Odin and Frigga from Malekith. Foster notices that the Earth-1610 Mjolnir is about to shatter from the battle, and she hurls it one last time at Laufey. Foster bids farewell to the Earth-1610 Mjolnir as it returns to her, crumbling; however, its shards form a golden bracelet on her arm. Foster learns that this bracelet can now be anything that she needs. As she sees the sorrow in Thor mourning the Valkrior and his faith in Valhalla, Foster knows she needs to become a Valkyrie. Foster becomes the first in a new generation of Valkyries, armed with Undrjarn the All-Weapon, named so by the spirit of Brunnhilde as she and the Valkrior spirits rise from their bodies to find Valhalla.

== Powers and abilities ==
=== Thor ===
When wielding Mjolnir, Foster gains all the powers of Thor, including the base Asgardian traits of superhuman strength, speed, stamina, and durability, as well as Thor's flight and control over lightning.

But Foster demonstrates a form of control over Mjolnir that her predecessors lacked, such as changing its trajectory and velocity in mid-throw, and spinning it around her enemies to trap them, abilities neither Beta Ray Bill nor any of those aside from Jane had ever displayed.

=== Valkyrie ===
As Valkyrie, Jane Foster wields Undrjarn the All-Weapon, a weapon that can change its shape into any weapon of her will. These include a sword, an extendable mace, or even wings to fly. Jane Foster possesses various superhuman attributes due to her Asgardian physiology, granting her superhuman strength, speed, stamina, and durability, alongside new powers common among valkyries, such as mystical teleportation and death perception.

== Critical response ==
Thomas Bacon of Screen Rant described Jane Foster as "Marvel's best Thor to date," writing, "Right now, Jane Foster's death obscures the future of the Thor brand over in the comics. She has had a powerful impact, and has come to be loved by fans. [...] It's ironic; the death was always going to happen. But it was executed with so much style that it has had an impact Marvel could never have expected. Jane Foster has become their best Thor; it's just such a tragedy that it will be the death of her." Rosie Knight of Nerdist asserted, "Thor has long been a staple of the House of Ideas. Though many have wielded the mystical hammer Mjolnir, it requires a lot to truly take on the mantle of Thor. In 2014's Thor comic series, the "Goddess of Thunder" story arc by Jason Aaron, Russell Dauterman, and Matt Wilson introduced the world to an entirely new incarnation of the iconic character. Recasting Jane Foster as Thor was as stroke of genius, and brought a legion of new fans to the title." Mayra Garcia of Comic Book Resources referred to Jane Foster as one of Marvel's "strongest female gods," saying, "Even though her time as Thor was cut short due to her cancer, Jane showed great prowess in battle and also, an undeniable heroic streak. She showed her mighty power up until the moment she sacrificed herself to defeat Mangog, but even after death, Jane returned as a Valkyrie, proving that heroism goes beyond superpowers. Many fans are very excited to see her in Thor: Love And Thunder."

Eric Nierstedt of ComicsVerse wrote, "Escapism or not, comics have shown us the horrible truth of how much sickness and disease can affect even the strongest person. THOR is the best example of this in comics right now. Since Jane Foster (who was fighting cancer) picked up Mjolnir, we as readers have been treated to the classic godly and otherworldly thrills that only THOR can provide. We've also seen a sickly, dying woman sitting in a chair, having poison pumped into her body to kill the poison that's already there. Worse, we see that same woman be a hero, only to learn that doing so is actually killing her faster." Deirdre Kaye of Scary Mommy called Jane Foster a "role model" and a "truly heroic" female character. Brian Truitt of USA Today asserted, "In Thor No. 8, out Wednesday and illustrated by Russell Dauterman, Dr. Jane Foster is revealed as the mysterious masked woman who has been swinging Mjolnir as Thor since the Dude Formerly Known as Thor — now just called the Odinson — was deemed unworthy. It's a big step in the evolution of the female character, according to Thor series writer Jason Aaron, but Jane's place as Marvel Comics' resident thunder goddess is just part of the current tale. [...] The response to the new female Thor, even when people didn't know who was under her mask, has been admittedly "overwhelming" for Aaron since she was announced on ABC's The View last July. But, he says he never thought it would be that big a deal in the first place."

== Literary reception ==
=== Volumes ===
==== Thor (2014) ====
According to Diamond Comic Distributors, Thor #1 was the 3rd best selling comic book in October 2014. Thor #1 was the 6th best selling comic book in 2014. Thor #5 was the 11th best selling comic book in February 2015. The first five issues of Thor have sold over 100 000 more copies than the previous 2012's Thor: God of Thunder series in March 2015.

Jesse Schedeen of IGN gave Thor #1 a grade of 7.8 out of 10, asserting, "The new volume of Thor faces an uphill battle as it works to escape the shadow of God of Thunder. This first issue doesn't entirely replicate the sense of awesome grandeur of Aaron and Ribic's work and its three-pronged focus on Thor. It's different stylistically, but very much a continuation thematically. Hopefully as the series unfolds, Aaron and Dauterman mesh as storytellers, and we see more of the new female protagonist, this volume of Thor will grow to reach the heights of its predecessor." Chase Magnett of ComicBook.com gave Thor #1 a grade of B+, writing, "The constant in this transition is Jason Aaron. His scripting is as compelling as ever. The first issue of Thor: God of Thunder ended with a very big moment and here he concludes the second issue with two, both of which should leave fans' jaws hanging. There is a hefty amount of exposition to be covered in the beginning of the issue, carrying over from both Original Sin and Thor: God of Thunder. Aaron summarizes the big points with as much grace as possible and focuses on the story at hand. Thor #1 continues Aaron's central themes from the previous series, primarily focusing on the concept of worthiness. It is in the title of the issue itself: "If He Be Worthy". Throughout the early exposition, various figures ponder the fate of Mjolnir and question why no one is able to lift the hammer. These questions form the central conflict of the story. The monstrous antagonists of the first few pages are not nearly as great of a challenge to Thor as his inability to list Mjolnir is. Where Aaron and his collaborators go from here will prove interesting. They have crafted a conflict that has the potential to reflect upon gender politics, redemption, and self-worth. Thor has a long way to go in providing answers and a thesis for these ideas. Together, Dauterman, Wilson, and Aaron have crafted a first issue that ought to compel fans of Thor: God of Thunder to stick around and encourage others to try the new series. Thor #1 is a beautiful debut that contains all of the thunder and power of Marvel's mightiest hero."

==== The Mighty Thor (2015) ====
According to Diamond Comic Distributors, The Mighty Thor #1 was the 12th best selling comic book in November 2015.

Marykate Jasper of Comic Book Resources called The Mighty Thor #1 a "fine first issue," writing, "Speaking of motive, the clever conceit of "The Mighty Thor" #1 -- that Jane must endanger her mortal body in order to assume her godly one—also creates a very strong character moment that speaks to what makes this Thor unique. To Jane, her power as an individual, mortal doctor is obviously equal to that of a goddess of Thunder. Unfortunately, Aaron also utilizes the more regressive politics of traditional fantasy: democracy is impotent, words are nothing next to force and every character's evil or good intentions can be easily inferred from their world of origin. With so many wonderful, interesting shakeups in this issue, I'd have loved to see a little shift in worldview to go with it. Still, as a whole, "The Mighty Thor" #1 is a wonderful opener. I'm always happy to see Aaron on an Asgard book; he has a great sense of Thor's world and what makes it work, and Dauterman and Wilson's art shows that same understanding of what's so cool about the Ten Realms. "Mighty Thor" is off to an excellent start." Jesse Schedeen of IGN gave The Mighty Thor #1 a grade of 9 out of 10, saying, "As with much of Aaron's work, there's a fair amount of humor to balance out the more dramatic elements. In this case the humor is of the darker variety, mostly centering around how terrible Roxxon and its master are. Roxxon is basically an indictment of greedy energy corporations, crooked politicians and vapid, fear-mongering newscasters all rolled into one. It adds a fun element of satire to the book that, again, helps keep things grounded ever so slightly amid all the spectacle and grandeur. Not that the book doesn't deliver plenty when it comes to spectacle and grandeur. Russell Dauterman proves once again why he's one of Marvel's best acquisitions in recent years. With his graceful line-work and sweeping, epic shots, it's easy to fool yourself into thinking that Olivier Coipel has started drawing Thor again. Dauterman brings his own brand of charm to the book, though. His style is perfectly suited to the dual nature of the book. He captures all the scope and majesty of Asgardia and its inhabitants, but his work is equally great at subtle emotion. The reader can't help but feel the intense pain and suffering Jane experiences as she undergoes her chemotherapy - it's written on every line and crease of her face. Dauterman has already grown significantly since his early Thor issues, so it'll be fun to see just how much his style continues to evolve as this new series gets underway. Thor is the last character that need sprucing up for the All-New, All-Different Marvel relaunch, so it's nice to see that Marvel didn't attempt to fix what wasn't broken. This issue offers an easy gateway into Aaron's ongoing saga, but it also dives right into the myriad conflicts that were left dangling prior to Secret Wars. Even in this first issue, this is a series that captures both the epic scope and intimate drama that make a good Thor comic."

==== Valkyrie: Jane Foster (2019) ====
According to Diamond Comic Distributors, Valkyrie: Jane Foster #1 was the 39th best selling comic book in July 2019.

Karen O'brien of Comic Book Resources described Valkyrie: Jane Foster #1 as "the culmination of writer Jason Aaron's multi-year reimagination of the plucky doctor as a hero," asserting, "Valkyrie: Jane Foster #1 is a worthy successor to Jane Foster's tenure as the god of thunder. The inventive creative team has set into motion multiple complex conflicts that will test her new abilities and responsibilities both as a Valkyrie and as a doctor. While an enjoyable debut for longtime fans of Aaron's work with the character, it's also a great jumping-on point for new readers." Kate Kosturski of WomenWriteAboutComics stated, "Valkyrie: Jane Foster #1 presumes you read the War of the Realms event. You can certainly jump on with this series without having that knowledge, but reading (or re-reading) the event will provide a second layer of context to Jane's existential struggle between her two worlds. I do wish this title had the touch of a female writer to lend a feminine perspective. But we do have Jason Aaron, a man who knows Jane Foster (The Mighty Thor) inside and out. Our Jane is in good hands." Cass Clarke of SlashFilm included the Valkyrie: Jane Foster comic book series in their "14 Best Marvel Comics That Love & Thunder Fans Will Want To Read" list, saying, "What works best about this new direction for Jane Foster is how the creative team seamlessly blends her medical knowledge with her cosmic duties. Whether or not she's serving as a Valkyrie, Jane always acts with compassion, providing the best care she can. Her journey to accept that some deaths are unpreventable is compelling to watch, especially as she adjusts to her new job of being a ferryman for departed souls."

==== Jane Foster & The Mighty Thor (2022) ====
According to Diamond Comic Distributors, Jane Foster & The Mighty Thor #1 was the 7th best selling comic book in June 2022.

Caitlin Chappell of Comic Book Resources called Jane Foster & The Mighty Thor #1 a "promising future for fans of Valkyrie," writing, "For the most part, Sabino stylistically distinguishes the characters' inner monologues, but there are a couple of moments where the reader may wonder who's talking. However, when an Asgardian, or Jane, in one of her heroic personas, talks, Sabino makes a subtle but appreciated font change to make it look more ancient, helping to give credence to the almost Shakespearean way many of the Asgardians speak. It's a clever way to establish an accent without spelling things out phonetically or distracting from the proceedings. This exposition-heavy issue doesn't give either of the Thors many opportunities to leap into action, but that will likely change in Issue #2, as a team-up between Jane and Thor seems to be on the horizon. It will also be exciting to see more of Dowling's art in action, as the close-up facial expressions of characters are realistic yet soft, giving many characters a regal feel to them. On top of that, Aburtov's colors play with lightning and shadow to give these characters a glow about them, especially toward the second half of the issue. Overall, readers will have to wait for the meat of Jane Foster & The Mighty Thor, but if they can get through the dense exposition in this first issue, they're sure to enjoy the epic team-up that's on its way." Jim Dandeneau of Den of Geek included the Jane Foster & The Mighty Thor comic book series in their "Best Thor Comics to Grab For Love & Thunder" list. Cass Clarke of SlashFilm included the Jane Foster & The Mighty Thor comic book series in their "14 Best Marvel Comics That Love & Thunder Fans Will Want To Read" list.

== Other versions ==
=== Marvel 1985 ===
An alternate universe version of Jane Foster appears in Marvel 1985 #6.

=== Secret Wars: Thors ===
Several alternate universe versions of Jane Foster appear in Secret Wars.

=== Thor: The Mighty Avenger ===
An alternate universe version of Jane Foster from Earth-10091 appears in Thor: The Mighty Avenger. This version is the head of the department of Nordic Antiquities at the Bergen War Memorial Museum in Bergen, Oklahoma.

=== Ultimate Marvel ===
An alternate version of Jane Foster from Earth-1610 appears in the Ultimate Marvel imprint. This version is part of an anarchist cult who believe Thorlief Golmen to be the genuine god of thunder.

=== What If? ===
Several alternate universe versions of Jane Foster appear in the What If? series:

- In What If? #10 (Aug. 1978) titled "What If Jane Foster Had Found the Hammer of Thor", Foster finds Mjolnir instead of Donald Blake and becomes Thordis. Odin eventually forces her to give the hammer to Blake, but allows her to live in Asgard, where she later marries him.
- In What If? #25 (Feb. 1980), titled "What If Thor Fought Odin over Jane Foster" (also known as "What If Thor Fought the Asgardian Gods"), Thor is banished from Asgard along with Jane after refusing to accept Odin's judgment.

=== King Thor ===
An alternate version of Jane Foster appears in King Thor's future timeline. Thor, with the help of his three granddaughters, recreated the Human race with the two first human beings named Steve and Jane. Unlike the ancient humans, they possessed longevity. However, when the time had come for Jane, King Thor offered Jane eternal life, but she refused, because she wanted to be reunited with her love, Steve, in the afterlife.

== In other media ==
=== Television ===
- Jane Foster appears in "The Mighty Thor" segment of The Marvel Super Heroes, voiced by Vita Linder.
- Jane Foster appears in The Avengers: Earth's Mightiest Heroes, voiced by Kari Wahlgren. This version is a paramedic.
- Jane Foster appears in the Mad short "ArTHOR", voiced by Grey DeLisle.
- Jane Foster / Thor appears in Avengers Assemble, voiced by Erica Lindbeck. This version is a cross-dimensional research intern. After the Cabal scatter the Avengers across time and space, Foster helps the New Avengers reunite them. After both groups become involved in the Beyonder's Battleworld, Foster helps destroy it before receiving an enchanted mace and the name Thunderstrike.

=== Marvel Cinematic Universe ===
Natalie Portman (right) as Jane Foster in the film Thor along with her co-star Chris Hemsworth as Thor

Natalie Portman portrays Jane Foster in media set in the Marvel Cinematic Universe (MCU). She makes her first appearance in the live-action film Thor (2011), before making subsequent appearances in the live-action films Thor: The Dark World (2013), and Thor: Love and Thunder (2022), with the latter seeing her become the Mighty Thor. Additionally, alternate timeline variants of Foster appear in the live-action film Avengers: Endgame (2019), and the animated Disney+ series What If...? (2021).

=== Video games ===
- Jane Foster / Thor appears as an unlockable playable character in Lego Marvel's Avengers, voiced by Elizabeth Maxwell.
- Jane Foster / Thor appears as an unlockable playable character in Marvel Contest of Champions.
- Jane Foster / Thor appears as an unlockable playable character in Marvel Future Fight.
- Jane Foster / Thor appears as an alternate costume for Thor Odinson in Marvel Heroes, voiced by Jennifer Hale.
- Jane Foster / Thor appears as an unlockable playable character in Marvel Avengers Alliance.
- Jane Foster / Thor appears as an unlockable playable character in Marvel Puzzle Quest.
- Jane Foster / Thor appears as an unlockable playable character in Marvel Avengers Academy, voiced by Marissa Lenti.
- Jane Foster / Thor appears as an unlockable playable character in Lego Marvel Super Heroes 2.
- Jane Foster / Thor appears as an unlockable playable character in Marvel Strike Force.
- Jane Foster / Thor appears as a playable DLC character in Marvel's Avengers, voiced by Zehra Fazal. This version hails from an alternate timeline where she was diagnosed with terminal cancer following A-Day, became the new Thor after the original lost his arm in combat and let Mjolnir choose her to succeed him, and joined her timeline's Avengers before being transported to the "prime" universe due to Monica Rappaccini's work with tachyon particles affecting Foster's timeline. Additionally, the "prime" Foster is stated to be healthy as she was not present during A-Day.
- Jane Foster / Thor appears as a playable character in Marvel Snap.
- Jane Foster appears as Mighty Thor in Fortnite: Battle Royale.

=== Merchandise ===
- In 2022, Hasbro released a Jane Foster / Thor action figure inspired by the Marvel Cinematic Universe (MCU) incarnation of the character, as part of the Marvel Legends action figure line.
- In 2023, Iron Studios released a Jane Foster / Thor action figure inspired by the MCU incarnation of the character.
