= Valkyrior =

Fictional female army

- The Valkyrior as seen in Fear Itself: The Fearless #1 (October 2011). Art by Mark Bagley.

Publication information
- Publisher: Marvel Comics
- First appearance: Thor #133 (October 1966)
- Created by: Stan Lee (writer); Jack Kirby (artist)

Characteristics
- Place of origin: Asgard
- Pantheon: Norse
- Notable members: Brunnhilde; Hildegarde; Danielle Moonstar; Misty Knight; Jane Foster

The Valkyrior is a fictional organization appearing in American comic books published by Marvel Comics. Based on the Valkyries of Norse mythology, the group, created by Stan Lee and Jack Kirby, first appeared in Thor #133 (October 1966). Within the context of Marvel's shared universe, the Valkyrior is a group of female warriors led by Brunnhilde / Valkyrie that was originally designated by Odin to bring the souls of slain heroes to Valhalla. In 2013, the team became the subject of the short-lived series, The Fearless Defenders.

== Publication history ==
The Valkyrior, created by Stan Lee and Jack Kirby, first appeared in Thor #133 (October 1966). The team, led by Valkyrie and Misty Knight is the subject of the 2013 series, The Fearless Defenders by Cullen Bunn and Will Sliney. Bun said about his book: "The basic idea of the book is that Valkyrie is choosing a new team of Valkyrior, and she's been asked to choose all these women from the heroes of Midgard, instead of from Asgard. She has completely failed in this task. Valkyrie has been unable to choose anyone that she feels is worthy to be one of the hosts of the shield maidens. So she just hasn't done it. She's dropped the ball. Because she's not done what she said she would do, nature—or supernature, as it is—abhors a vacuum. The absence of the Valkyrior has opened the door to something terrible. Something awful is waking, and Valkyrie finds that it's really her fault that she's put everything at risk".

== Fictional history ==
The Valkyrior are warrior goddesses of Asgard who ride winged horses. Originally, under the leadership of Brunnhilde, they took mortally wounded human heroes from German and Scandinavian battlegrounds and brought them to Valhalla. The Valkyries were no longer able to perform this task when Odin, ruler of Asgard, vowed to the Celestials to restrict Asgardian contact with Earth.

In later years, Brunnhilde became a member of Earth's Defenders. The other Valkyries were killed during a war between Odin and Hela. Odin resurrects the Valkyries after retaking Valhalla, but they only have physical form within Valhalla; outside it, they exist only in astral form.

During the "War of the Realms" storyline, Brunnhilde and the rest of the Valkyrior, save Mirage, are massacred by Malekith and his forces invading New York. Afterwards, Jane Foster then takes up the mantle of Valkyrie.

== Members ==
=== Asgard Valkyrior ===
- Axe – A member of the Valkyrior
- Brunnhilde – The former leader of the Valkyrior
- Danielle Moonstar / Mirage – An original member of the New Mutants, she joined the Valkyrior
- Freya – A former member of the Valkyrior
- Gerda – A member of the Valkyrior
- Grimgerta – A member of the Valkyrior
- Gruenhilda – A member of the Valkyrior
- Hercara – A member of the Valkyrior
- Fatal Sisters – An elite trio of the Valkyrior
  - Hilda – A member of the Valkyrior
  - Mista – A member of the Valkyrior
  - Sangrida – a member of the Valkyrior
- Hildegarde – A member of the Valkyrior
- Krista – A member of the Valkyrior, she invited Danielle to join with the Valkyrior
- Leita – A member of the Valkyrior
- Rossveissa – A member of the Valkyrior who was forced to serve Hela
- Svava – A member of the Valkyrior who was forced to serve Hela
- Sygnet – A member of the Valkyrior
- Valtrauta – The current leader of the Valkyrior
- Jane Foster – The first of a new generation of the Valkyrior
- Rūna – One of the original nine Valkyries and the original wielder of Jarnbjorn

=== Disir ===
- Brün – The leader of the Disir
- Göndul – A member of the Disir
- Hlökk – A member of the Disir
- Kára – A member of the Disir

=== Defenders Valkyrior ===
- Brunnhilde – The leader of the Defenders
- Misty Knight – A member of the Valkyrior and Defenders
- Elsa Bloodstone – A member of the Valkyrior and Defenders
- Clea – A member of the Valkyrior and Defenders
- Danielle Moonstar – A former member of the Valkyrior and Defenders
- Nova – A member of the Valkyrior
- Ren Kimura – A member of the Valkyrior and Defenders, girlfriend of Annabelle
- Annabelle Riggs – A member of the Valkyrior and Defenders, girlfriend of Ren
- Hippolyta – A member of the Valkyrior and Defenders

== In other media ==
The Valkyrior appear in Thor: Ragnarok. This version of the group was massacred by Hela, with Valkyrie / Scrapper 142 being the sole survivor.
