= The War of the Realms =

Marvel Comics crossover event

- Cover of The War of the Realms #1 (April 2019) by Arthur Adams and Matt Wilson
- Publisher: Marvel Comics
- Publication date: April – July 2019
- Genre: Superhero; Crossover
Title(s)
The War of the Realms #1-6
WotR: Journey into Mystery #1–5
WotR: New Agents of Atlas #1–4
WotR: Punisher #1–3
WotR: Spider-Man & the League of Realms #1–3
WotR Strikeforce: The Dark Elf Realm #1
WotR Strikeforce: The Land of Giants #1
WotR Strikeforce: The War Avengers #1
WotR: Uncanny X-Men #1–3
WotR: War Scrolls #1–3
War of the Realms Omega #1
- Main character(s): Thor; Malekith the Accursed; Avengers; Agents of Atlas; Champions; Fantastic Four; League of Realms; War Avengers; X-Men; Daredevil

Creative team
- Writer: Jason Aaron
- Artist: Russell Dauterman
- Letterer: Joe Sabino
- Colorist: Matthew Wilson
- Editor(s): Will Moss, Tom Brevoort

"The War of the Realms" is a 2019 comic book storyline published by Marvel Comics, written by Jason Aaron and drawn by Russell Dauterman. The storyline has been met with positive reviews, with critics praising the storyline and the art.

== Premise ==
The story details Earth's heroes banding together when Malekith the Accursed leads his forces to invade Midgard, the last realm he has to conquer.

== Plot ==
In Asgard, Odin is targeted by Malekith the Accursed's assassins, who reveal that they have created a Dark Bifrost Bridge that will allow them to teleport to any of the ten realms. On Earth, Thor and his hellhound dog Thori are relaxing when Loki crashes in front of them and tells Thor that Malekith stabbed him. Thor agrees to Loki's terms of helping him for Malekith's location. Loki, who is revealed to be Malekith, transports Thor to Jotunheim, the place where Frost Giants live; they proceed to attack Thor. With Thor gone, Malekith plans to wage war on Earth/Midgard.

In The Bronx, Spider-Man encounters Thor's mother Frigga fighting against Malekith's assassins. Sif and her Valkyries meet up with Frigga, since most of the Asgardians now live on Earth as refugees. Valkyrie sends out a signal that Malekith is coming, which is heard by Doctor Strange, Wolverine, Daredevil, Punisher, Blade, Ghost Rider, and the Avengers. During the battle in New York, Malekith arrives with his Dark Council. Laufey is about to eat Frigga when the real Loki arrives, saves his adopted mother, and fights Malekith. Strange teleports Malekith away, and Laufey berates Loki on his recent treachery and eats him.

During the evacuation of New York civilians into the Sanctum Sanctorum, Jane Foster stands outside leading people in. During the chaos, the heroes do their best to fight. It is revealed that Malekith hired a coven of War Witches which prevents Doctor Strange from using his full power. As the war wages on, Odin, who survived the attempt on his life, and his Asgardian army arrive. Valkyrie helps Jane kill the War Witches. Strange uses all of his power to transport the remaining heroes to Avengers Mountain in the North Pole, where Ghost Rider and Sif take Odin to rest, while Captain America orders Carol Danvers to get as many heroes as she needs to defend Earth. Frigga appoints Jane as the All Mother of Asgard, but Jane is saddened at the destruction of Earth. Back on Earth, Brunnhilde is the last person fighting against the Dark Elves before she is decapitated by Malekith, leaving Jane to carry on the legacy of the Valkyrie.

While resting from their battles, Frigga asks Captain America to assemble a group to rescue Thor. Meanwhile, Daredevil takes Heimdall's sword, which helps fix the Bifrost Bridge and allows the group to split into four groups: Captain America and his team (consisting of Spider-Man, Wolverine, Iron Fist and Luke Cage) will go rescue Thor; Frigga and her group (consisting of Blade, She-Hulk, Ghost Rider and Punisher impersonating members of Malekith's forces) will go to destroy the Dark Bifrost Bridge; Captain Marvel will go to Earth to deal with Malekith while recruiting her War Avengers; and Jane Foster remains with Heimdall, Daredevil, and the Destroyer armor to defend the Bifrost Bridge. Malekith lays destruction over Europe and plans to slay Black Knight, Union Jack and Spitfire with the Ebony Blade when Captain Marvel arrives with her War Avengers (Deadpool, Weapon H, Winter Soldier, Captain Britain, Lady Sif and Venom).

As the War Avengers fight the Dark Elves, the Venom symbiote attacks Malekith, only to be absorbed into his sword. The Dark Elves launch a sneak attack on Jane Foster's group while Tony Stark and Shuri help the dwarves create new weapons, and Black Panther and the Dora Milaje prepare for a Frost Giant attack on Avenger Mountain. During the chaos, Daredevil grows disoriented, which enables the Dark Elves to destroy the Bifrost Bridge. Frigga's group arrives at the Dark Bifrost Bridge. When Frigga realizes that the Bifrost Bridge has been destroyed, she changes plans and protects the Dark Bifrost. Captain America's group finds Thor, but realizes that Thor is in his berserker rage after destroying many Frost Giants.

Frigga grabs the sword of the Black Bifrost Bridge and sends members of her group to the other realms to recruit more allies, in which they succeed. Frigga opens a portal to Jotunheim, where Captain America's group and a weakened Thor go through. The rest of the groups arrive in the Avengers Mountain, where they are attacked. Black Panther and Shuri activate the Celestial in the Avengers Mountain, which destroys all of Malekith's forces. While Thor is in the infirmary, Odin wakes up and demands to know where Frigga is. Captain America tries telling Odin that he cannot fight while injured, but Iron Man reveals that he, Shuri, and Screwbeard the Dwarf created an armor that is a mixture of uru and vibranium for Odin to wear in battle. Malekith tries to tame the symbiote by using a dagger of living abyss on the Venom symbiote to reshape it into Knull's All-Black, designed to kill Asgardians. Frigga is busy fighting off the endless hordes when Malekith throws the Venom symbiote as a spear at Frigga. Before he can kill her, Odin arrives in his new armor and allows Frigga to destroy the Black Bifrost Bridge. On Midgard, after being fully healed, Thor announces that he will lead the charge against Malekith's army.

Wakanda is attacked by evil Angels of Heaven when Hildegarde, Okoye, Lady Sif, Angela, Black Panther, Punisher, and the Light Elves arrive to help. In Uruguay, the Enchantress raises the dead, but Ghost Rider, Doctor Strange, and Balder the Brave ward her off. Spider-Man has allied with the Spiders of Hel to defeat the enemies, She-Hulk along with Deadpool, Luke Cage, Daredevil and Iron Fist, are fighting against Ulik and his army in Australia. Near Roxxon headquarters, service has been restored with the Agents of Wakanda, while Blade and Ka-Zar, along with the Vanir Gods, come to their rescue. Roz Solomon and Jane Foster fight Minotaur, causing Roxxon's stocks to end up in a free fall. Captain Marvel defeats Sindr in Shanghai with Wolverine, Shang-Chi, Hawkeye, and the Warriors Three helping defeat the Fire Demons. In Manhattan, Iron Man equips the dwarves with War Machine armor, and they lead the attack on Laufey with help from the Fantastic Four. In London, Captain America is helping Captain Britain fight off Dark Elves, Thori is dealing with the Dark Witches, and Volstagg controls the Destroyer armor to defeat Kurse. Thor returns and helps turn the tide. Then Daredevil takes Thor to the sun, where Thor reveals that when Asgardia was destroyed, he threw a seed in the sun, which grew into Yggdrasil. Thor orders Daredevil to nail him onto the tree and ignore his screams until he can find an answer.

While Thor is in the sun, it is revealed that Malekith is torturing Odin and Frigga with the Venom symbiote in Stonehenge. In Asgard, Jane Foster meets up with Heimdall, who tells Jane to not overexert herself, but Jane counters that and notices the broken hammer of Ultimate Thor and lifts it, transforming her.

As Thor is still pinned to Yggdrasil, he gets the answer he seeks in the form of finding other versions of himself. Mister Fantastic and Thing emerge from a time portal, and King Thor arrives, having expected this day to happen. Thor explains the situation to King Thor as they stand in the ruins of Asgard. While recapping the fight with Gorr the God Butcher and seeing how Thor is starting to resemble him, King Thor agrees with the plan to find more Thors and recruits the younger Thor from the 6th Century. Jane Foster appears in her Thor form, revealing that she is using Mjolnir from Earth-1610, and they form the Thor Corps.

Back in Manhattan, the superheroes are fighting Laufey, now empowered after swallowing the Casket of Ancient Winters, and his Frost Giants. Knowing that the Thor Corps is approaching, Malekith augments his acolytes with the Venom symbiote and then bonds with it. When the Thor Corps arrives, Malekith declares himself the Butcher of Thors. As Thor fights Malekith, he tries to impale Jane Foster, causing Thor to go into his berserker state and throwing himself into Malekith, as the other Thors sense the God Tempest approaching. When the Tempest arrives on Earth, it starts to rain fire and ice. As the symbiote-possessed Acolytes are harmed by the fire, the God Tempest reconstitutes itself into a restored Mjolnir, which Thor manages to lift, while Jane throws her Mjolnir into Laufey. Loki cuts himself and the Casket of Ancient Winters free from Laufey's stomach using Hofund. Thor urges Malekith to surrender as Malekith summons the Great Hunt, but instead the Wild Hunt Hounds and the Svartálfheim Bog Tiger dismember Malekith.

With the War of the Realms over, peace spreads across the Ten Realms. Daredevil laments the loss of his divine powers, Punisher resumes his one-man war on crime, and the Venom symbiote regains its humanoid form, claiming that Malekith's magic got rid of its mental instability, while it prepares for the upcoming event involving Carnage. Jane Foster bids farewell to the Earth-1610 Mjolnir as it crumbles; its shards combine and merge into a golden vambrace that forms on her arm. The younger Thor and King Thor bond over their mutual love of alcohol, while Odin steps down and makes Thor the new All-Father.

== Issues involved ==
=== Road to The War of the Realms ===
- Asgardians of the Galaxy #6–7
- Avengers Vol. 8 #14–17
- Thor Vol. 5 #10–11

=== Main ===
- War of the Realms #1–6

=== Tie-ins ===
- Asgardians of the Galaxy #8–10
- Avengers Vol. 8 #18–20
- Captain Marvel Vol. 10 #6–7
- Champions Vol. 3 #5–6
- Deadpool Vol. 7 #13–14
- Fantastic Four Vol. 6 #10
- Giant-Man #1–3
- Moon Girl and Devil Dinosaur #43
- Superior Spider-Man Vol. 2 #7–8
- Thor Vol. 5 #12–14
- Tony Stark: Iron Man #12–13
- Unbeatable Squirrel Girl Vol. 2 #43–46
- Venom Vol. 4 #13–15
- War of the Realms: Journey into Mystery #1–5
- War of the Realms: New Agents of Atlas #1–4
- War of the Realms: Punisher #1–3
- War of the Realms: Spider-Man & the League of Realms #1–3
- War of the Realms Strikeforce: The Dark Elf Realm #1
- War of the Realms Strikeforce: The Land of Giants #1
- War of the Realms Strikeforce: The War Avengers #1
- War of the Realms: Uncanny X-Men #1–3
- War of the Realms: War Scrolls #1–3

=== Aftermath ===
- War of the Realms Omega #1
- Loki Vol. 3 #1–5
- Punisher Kill Krew #1–5
- Thor Vol. 5 #15–16
- Valkyrie Vol. 3 #1–10

== Reception ==
=== Critical reception ===
According to the review aggregator website Comic Book Roundup, Issue #1 received an average score of 8.6/10 based on 25 reviews from critics. Adam Barnhardt from Comicbook.com states "Though dense at times, War of the Realms transforms a dreary Midgard into an icy, fiery post-apocalyptic hellscape and the end result is an astonishing book that well worth taking in."

Issue #2 received an average score of 8.5/10 based on 19 reviews from critics on Comic Book Roundup. Deron Generally from the Super Powered Fancast states "Russell Dauterman delivers some beautiful and powerful art throughout this issue and all of the details, including the bloody conclusion, look amazing."

Issue #3 received an average score of 8.6/10 based on 16 reviews from critics on Comic Book Roundup. Matt Attanasio from Comicsverse wrote "WAR OF THE REALMS #3 is as exhilarating as it is gorgeous. Aaron's fast-paced writing, coupled with Dauterman and Wilson's beautiful pages, make this the strongest issue of the massive crossover event so far."

Issue #4 received an average score of 8.6/10 based on 17 reviews from critics on Comic Book Roundup. Adam Barnhardt from ComicBook.com wrote "This story is far from over and yet, it's already sequential storytelling at its best."

Issue #5 received an average score of 8.2/10 based on 11 reviews from critics on Comic Book Roundup. Brandon J. Griffin from Monkey Fighting Robots wrote "WAR OF THE REALMS is a return to form for Marvel events, it's an instant classic that just has fun being a Marvel comic book. This is should be the blueprint for large-scale comic book crossover events going forward; hopefully DC is paying attention as well."

Issue #6 received an average score of 9/10 based on 10 reviews from critics on Comic Book Roundup. Pashtrik Maloki from Sequential Planet wrote "War of the Realms is the culmination of seven years of buildup and the result couldn't be better. The book is fantastic, possibly the best event since Hickman's Secret Wars in 2015."

== Collected editions ==
Title	Material collected	Format	Publication date	ISBN
War of the Realms: Prelude	Thor #344, Thor: God of Thunder #13, 17, Mighty Thor #1-2, 13-14, 22, material from Thor: God of Thunder #25, Mighty Thor #4, 700, Mighty Thor: At the Gates of Valhalla	Paperback	13 March 2019	1302916637
The War of the Realms	War of the Realms #1-6, War of the Realms: Omega	Paperback	27 August 2019	1846539889
War Of The Realms: Strikeforce	War of The Realms Strikeforce: The Land of The Giants, War of The Realms Strikeforce: The Dark Elf Realm, War of The Realms Strikeforce: The War Avengers	Paperback	3 September 2019	1302918559
War Of The Realms: Uncanny X-Men	War of The Realms: Uncanny X-Men #1-3, material from War of the Realms: War Scrolls #2	Paperback	29 October 2019	1302919199
War of the Realms: New Agents of Atlas	War of The Realms: New Agents of Atlas #1-4	Paperback	17 September 2019	130291877X
War Of The Realms: Amazing Spider-Man/Daredevil	War of The Realms: Spider-Man & The League of Realms #1-3, material from War of the Realms: War Scrolls #1-3	Paperback	24 September 2019	1302919288
War of the Realms: Journey Into Mystery	War Of The Realms: Journey Into Mystery #1-5	Paperback	10 September 2019	1302918346
War Of The Realms: The Punisher	War of The Realms: The Punisher #1-3, material from War of the Realms: War Scrolls #3	Paperback	22 October 2019	1302919059
War of the Realms: Giant-Man	Giant-Man #1-3, material from War of the Realms: War Scrolls #1	Paperback	20 August 2019	1302918281
Captain Marvel Vol. 2: War of the Realms	Captain Marvel (vol. 10) #6-11	Paperback	16 June 2020	1846533899
Thor Vol. 2: Road to War of the Realms	Thor (vol. 5) #7-11	Paperback	2 July 2019	1302912909
Venom Vol. 4: The War of the Realms	Venom (vol. 4) #13-15 and Web of Venom: Funeral Pyre #1	Paperback	2 December 2019	1846539862
Asgardians of the Galaxy Vol. 2: War of the Realms	Asgardians Of The Galaxy #6-10	Paperback	3 September 2019	1302916920
Avengers By Jason Aaron Vol. 4: War of the Realms	Avengers (vol. 8) #18-21 and material from Free Comic Book Day 2019 Avengers/Savage Avengers #1	Paperback	10 December 2019	1302914626
Tony Stark: Iron Man Vol. 3: War of the Realms	Tony Stark: Iron Man #12-16	Paperback	5 November 2019	130291443X
Deadpool by Skottie Young Vol. 3: Weasel Goes to Hell	Deadpool (vol. 7) #13-15, Annual #1	Paperback	12 November 2019	1302914405
Fantastic Four by Dan Slott, Vol. 3: The Herald of Doom	Fantastic Four (vol. 6) #6-11	Paperback	1 October 2019	1302914421
Moon Girl and Devil Dinosaur Vol. 8: Yancy Street Legends	Moon Girl and Devil Dinosaur #42-47	Paperback	7 January 2020	1302914375
Superior Spider-Man Vol. 2: Otto-Matic	Superior Spider-Man (vol. 2) #7–12	Paperback	7 January 2020	1302914812
Unbeatable Squirrel Girl Vol. 11: Call Your Squirrelfriends	Unbeatable Squirrel Girl (vol. 2) #42–46	Paperback	24 September 2019	1302914480
Champions by Jim Zub Vol. 1: Beat The Devil	Champions (vol. 3) #1-6	Paperback	16 July 2019	1302916718
War Of The Realms Omnibus	War Of The Realms #1-6, War Of The Realms: Omega, War Of The Realms: War Scrolls #1-3, War Of The Realms Strikeforce: The Land Of The Giants, War Of The Realms Strikeforce: The Dark Elf Realm, War Of The Realms Strikeforce: The War Avengers, Giant-Man #1-3, War Of The Realms: Journey Into Mystery #1-5, Spider-Man & The League Of Realms #1-3, War Of The Realms: The Punisher #1-3, War Of The Realms: Uncanny X-Men #1-3, War Of The Realms: New Agents Of Atlas #1-4, Asgardians Of The Galaxy #8-10, Tony Stark: Iron Man #12-13, Venom (vol. 4) #13-15, Thor (vol. 5) #8-16, Avengers (vol. 8) #18-20, Captain Marvel (vol. 10) #6-7, Champions (vol. 3) #5-6, Deadpool (vol. 7) #13-14, Fantastic Four (vol. 6) #10, Moon Girl And Devil Dinosaur #43, Superior Spider-Man (vol. 2) #7-8, Unbeatable Squirrel Girl (vol. 2) #43-46	Hardcover	3 November 2020	1302926411
