= Russell Dauterman =

American comics artist

Russell Dauterman is an American comic book illustrator known for work on Supurbia for Boom! Studios and Nightwing for DC Comics. Before breaking into comics Dauterman served as a costume illustrator in the movie industry, working on such films as Captain America: The First Avenger.

In July 2014, Marvel Comics announced that Dauterman would be the artist on Thor series with writer Jason Aaron, which would debut that October, and feature a female Thor.

== Personal life ==
In June 2014, Russell Dauterman married a male engineer whose name has not been revealed. He is gay.

== Career ==
After graduating from Boston College, Dauterman went on to get a master's degree in costume design from the University of California, Los Angeles. Before making his way to comics, he found himself working in the film industry as an illustrator for costume designers for films like The Girl with the Dragon Tattoo and Captain America: The First Avenger.

== Bibliography ==
- The Mis-Adventures of Adam West #1 (pencils only, with writers Darren G. Davis, Adam West and Reed Lackey, Bluewater Productions, July 2011)
- Annie Automatic: Killer in Disguise #0 (illustrator, with writer Sam Scott, Whisper City Productions, July 2011)
- Supurbia Vol. 1 #1–4 (pencils and inks, with writer Grace Randolph, Boom! Studios, March 2012 – June 2012)
- Supurbia Vol. 2 #1–12 (pencils and inks, with writer Grace Randolph, Boom! Studios, November 2012 – October 2013)
- Nightwing #28–29 (pencils and inks, with writer Kyle Higgins, DC Comics, February 2014 – March 2014)
- Cyclops (2014) #1–3 (pencils and inks, with writer Greg Rucka, Marvel Comics, May 2014 – July 2014)
- Thor (2014) #1–4, 6–8 (pencils and inks, with writer Jason Aaron, Marvel Comics, October 2014 – May 2015)
- The Mighty Thor (2015) #1–5, 8–12, 15–20, 22, 700, 702–706 (pencils and inks, with writer Jason Aaron, Marvel Comics, November 2015 – April 2018)
- Unworthy Thor #4 (pencils and inks, with writer Jason Aaron and artists Frazer Irving, Esad Ribić, Olivier Coipel and Kim Jacinto, Marvel Comics, February 2017)
- War of The Realms #1–6 (pencils and inks, with writer Jason Aaron, Marvel Comics, April 2019 – June 2019)
- Giant Size X-Men: Jean Grey and Emma Frost #1 (pencils and inks, with writer Jonathan Hickman, Marvel Comics, February 2020)
- Marauders (covers, with writer Gerry Duggan, Marvel Comics, October 2019 – present)
- Giant-Size X-Men: Storm #1 (pencils and inks, with writer Jonathan Hickman, Marvel Comics, September 2020)
- X-Men (Vol. 5) #21 (pencils and inks, with writer Jonathan Hickman, Marvel Comics, June 2021)
- X-Men: Hellfire Gala #1 (pencils and inks, with writer Gerry Duggan, Marvel Comics, July 2022)
- Scarlet Witch (Vol. 3) #5 (pencils and inks, with writer Steve Orlando, Marvel Comics, May 2023)

== Filmography ==
- The Girl with the Dragon Tattoo (2011) Costume illustrator
- Captain America: The First Avenger (2011) – Costume illustrator
