= Kurse (comics) =

- Kurse (with Thor and Beta Ray Bill) on the cover of Thor #363 (January 1986). Art by Walter Simonson.

Publication information
- Publisher: Marvel Comics
- First appearance: As Algrim: Thor #347 (September 1984); As Kurse: Cameo; Secret Wars II #4 (October 1985); Full appearance Power Pack #18 (January 1986)
- Created by: Walter Simonson

In-story information
- Alter ego: Algrim
- Species: Dark Elf
- Partnerships: Thor; Malekith the Accursed
- Notable aliases: Algrim the Strong, Valgoth
- Abilities: Superhuman strength, speed, stamina and durability Ability to mystically track and locate enemies over large distances and see through illusions and disguises Enchanted armor grants: Near invulnerability Ability to see everything around him

Kurse is the name of two fictional characters appearing in American comic books published by Marvel Comics. Created by writer/artist Walter Simonson, the Algrim version of Kurse first appears as the Dark Elf Algrim the Strong in Thor #347 (September 1984). He is later transformed into Kurse in Secret Wars II #4 (October 1985).

Adewale Akinnuoye-Agbaje portrayed the character in the Marvel Cinematic Universe film Thor: The Dark World (2013).

== Publication history ==
The Dark Elf Algrim the Strong was created by Walter Simonson and first appeared in Thor #347 (September 1984). He is introduced initially as an ally to Malekith, tasked with guarding the kidnapped Lorelei. The character was later healed and transformed into Kurse in Secret Wars II #4 (October 1985) by the Beyonder.

In 2015's Mighty Thor issue #14 by Jason Aaron and Steve Epting, the mantle and the powers of "Kurse" were passed on to a new host, a dark elf called Lady Waziria. She reappeared in 2019's War of the Realms as a subordinate of Malekith.

== Fictional character biography ==
=== Algrim ===
Kurse was originally the most powerful of a race of Dark Elves and was known as Algrim the Strong. He is coerced by the Dark Elf ruler Malekith the Accursed to fight Thor. Malekith betrays Algrim, intending to kill him and Thor by opening a pitfall beneath them. Thor saves himself, while Algrim falls into lava. Algrim's armor saves his life, but he is still critically injured and develops amnesia from the shock.

Algrim is completely amnesic, except for his obsessive desire to gain revenge upon Thor. Algrim is later healed by the Beyonder, who transforms him into the much more powerful being called Kurse. The Beyonder transports Kurse to Earth to battle Thor, however Kurse mistakes Thor's ally Beta Ray Bill for Thor and battles him.

Despite overpowering Thor, Kurse is made to realize that it was Malekith, not Thor, who is to blame for his suffering. The Beyonder then transports Kurse to Hel at Thor's suggestion to frustrate Hela, the goddess of death. Kurse confronts and severely beats Loki, who had been disguised as Malekith. Drawing off, he leaves Loki injured and finds what he thinks is Balder the Brave, surrounded by legions of Asgardians. He barrels through them and slays his target, who turns out to be the true Malekith. After repenting, he is granted citizenship among the Asgardians.

Kurse is captured by Malekith, who strips him of the armor. Algrim is sent to Nastrond Prison and forced to serve out the rest of the sentence of Waziria, a former member of the League of Realms. Malekith forces Waziria to don the armor, transforming her into the new Kurse.

=== Waziria ===
Waziria is a Dark Elf witch of the Dove Gut Tribe in Svartalfheim. When Malekith escaped from his imprisonment and attacked his village, he cut off Waziria's left arm and took her hostage until she is rescued by Thor. After recuperating, Waziria works with the League of Realms to hunt down Malekith.

When the League of Realms split, only Waziria remains with Thor. During a meeting with the Dark Elf ruling council called the Council of the Unhallowed, Thor falsely accuses Waziria of being a traitor working with Malekith. Waziria and the Council of the Unhallowed later side with Malekith, who gives Algrim's armor to Waziria.

== Powers and abilities ==
Kurse possesses a number of superhuman attributes because he is a dark elf and has been mystically augmented. Kurse's main advantage is his strength - which originally was a close match to Thor's, but since then his strength was quadrupled in comparison to Thor's. He also has enchanted armor that has been fused to his skin by the Beyonder. Kurse is now almost totally invulnerable, except to iron, like all dark elves. Kurse can also track his opponents over thousands of miles and can see past illusions and disguises. His enchanted armor is sentient and allows Kurse to see everything around him.

Waziria can perform magic spells. She also possesses Algrim's abilities when she dons the Kurse armor.

== In other media ==
=== Film ===
- Algrim appears in Thor: Tales of Asgard, voiced by Ron Halder. This version was forced to ally with Surtur after Frost Giants devastated Svartalfheim and Odin refused to help the Dark Elves. After Odin defeated Surtur, he brings Algrim to his realm to serve the Asgardians as punishment. In the present, Algrim steals Surtur's sword and attempts to take revenge on Asgard, only to be defeated by Thor in battle and then killed by Loki.
- Algrim appears in Thor: The Dark World, portrayed by Adewale Akinnuoye-Agbaje. This version is Malekith's lieutenant who is transformed into the last of the Dark Elf "Kursed" soldiers, which greatly increases his strength and durability. Disguised as a captured Marauder prisoner, he is sent to Asgard's dungeon where he triggers his transformation, frees the other inmates, except Loki, and disables the city's energy shield so Malekith's forces may land. They then interrogate Frigga, whom Kurse then kills. Later, during a battle with Thor in Svartalfaheim, Algrim is killed when Loki activates a black hole grenade on his belt.

=== Video games ===
- Kurse appears as a miniboss in Marvel: Ultimate Alliance, voiced by Tom Kane.
- Kurse appears as a boss in Marvel: Avengers Alliance.
- Kurse appears in Marvel Heroes.
- Kurse appears as a playable character in Lego Marvel Super Heroes, voiced by Andrew Kishino.
- Kurse appears in the iOS tie-in game Thor: The Dark World, voiced by Dennis Carnegie.
