= Adewale Akinnuoye-Agbaje =

British actor (born 1967)

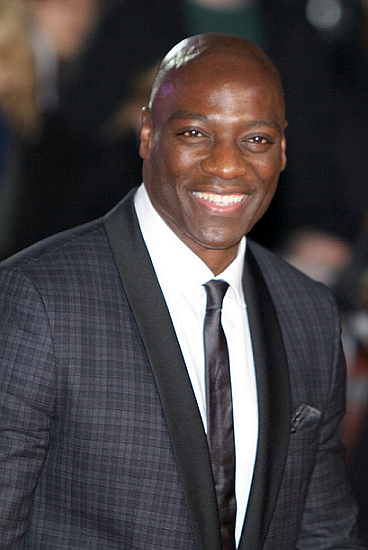
- Akinnuoye-Agbaje in 2013
- Born: 22 August 1967 (age 59); Islington, London, England
- Other names: Adewalé, Triple A
- Education: King's College London; University of London International Programme
- Occupation: Actor
- Years active: 1994–present
- Website: adewaletheartist.com/lander

Adewale Akinnuoye-Agbaje (/ˌædɪˈwɒli ˌækɪˈnɔɪeɪ æɡˈbɑːdʒeɪ/; Yoruba: [ādéwálé ākĩ́nùójè āɡ͡bádʒé]; born 22 August 1967) is a British actor. On television, he is best known for his roles as Simon Adebisi in Oz (1997–2000), Mr. Eko in Lost (2005–2006), and Alamo Brown in Euphoria (2026). Notable film roles include Hitu in Ace Ventura: When Nature Calls (1995), Lock-Nah in The Mummy Returns (2001), Nykwana Wombosi in The Bourne Identity (2002), Heavy Duty in G.I. Joe: The Rise of Cobra (2009), Kurse in Thor: The Dark World (2013), Dave Duerson in Concussion (2015), and Killer Croc in Suicide Squad (2016).

Akinnuoye-Agbaje's feature directorial debut, Farming, had its world premiere at the 2018 Toronto International Film Festival.

== Early life and education ==
Akinnuoye-Agbaje was born in Islington, to Nigerian parents of Yoruba origin, who were students in the UK. When he was six weeks old, his biological parents gave him up to a white working-class family in Tilbury. His foster parents had at least ten African children, including Akinnuoye-Agbaje's two sisters, living in their house at certain points. His foster father made a living as a lorry driver and struggled to support the family financially.

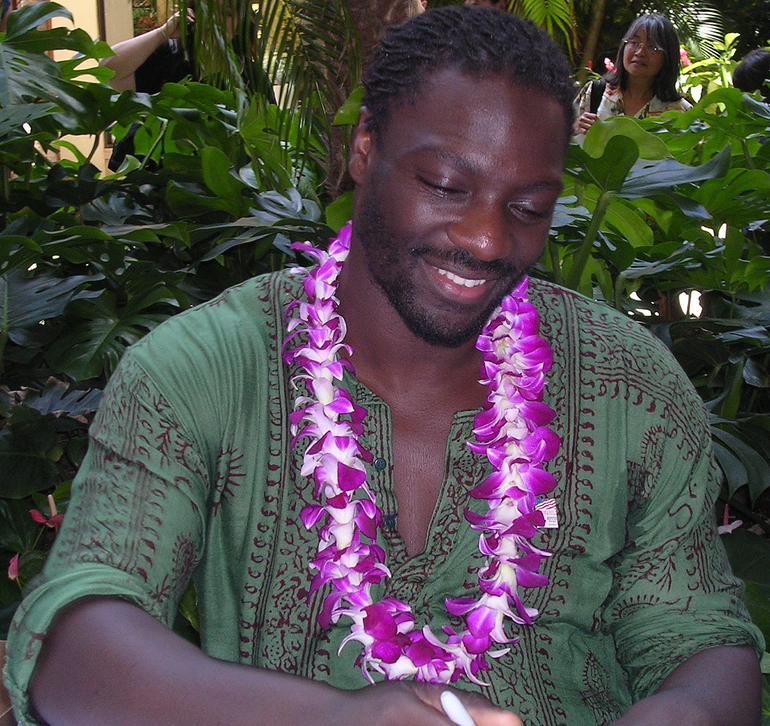
Red Cross benefit at the Hilton Hawaiian Village, 28 February 2007

When he was eight years old, his biological parents brought him back to Nigeria but, as he was unable to speak the Yoruba language and unable to assimilate, he was returned to Tilbury shortly thereafter. The brief exposure to Nigeria left him struggling to reconcile his heritage with the distinctly British culture and environment he was raised in. As a young boy, he was subject to continual racial abuse in the white neighbourhood he grew up. After enduring repeated physical attacks by local skinheads, he earned their respect by standing up to them and eventually aligned forces with them. At 16 years old, his birth parents sent him to a boarding school in Surrey where he gravitated to his studies and ultimately transformed his life.

He went on to earn his Bachelor's from the University of London at large and subsequently a Master's in Law from King's College London. While a university student, Akinnuoye-Agbaje worked in a clothes shop where he was introduced to the world of modelling. On March 17, 2017, he was awarded an Honorary PhD by Princess Anne, Chancellor of the University of London.

== Career ==
Akinnuoye-Agbaje's modelling career led him to Hollywood, where he began his acting career with a 1995 role in Congo.

His best-known acting roles have been as the imposing convict Simon Adebisi in the 1990s HBO prison series Oz and as Mr. Eko on ABC's survivor drama Lost. Film roles include The Bourne Identity, in which he played a deposed African dictator, Hitu the police officer in Ace Ventura: When Nature Calls, Lock-Nah in The Mummy Returns, and Heavy Duty in G.I. Joe: The Rise of Cobra. He was also featured in the video for singer-songwriter Grayson Hugh's hit "Talk It Over", which was in heavy rotation in 1989 on MTV and VH-1.

In 2009, Akinnuoye-Agbaje was in talks with Marvel Studios to play the superhero Black Panther in a proposed film of the same name. In an interview, he expressed excitement about the possibility, saying "the timing is so right" for a black superhero, and "while I'm in my prime, this is the time... I'm going to keep knocking on their door." In 2014 Marvel did announce a Black Panther film, but with Chadwick Boseman in the title role.

Akinnuoye-Agbaje guest-starred in the second episode of season 8 of Monk, and played Derek Jameson in the 2011 film The Thing. He portrayed Kurse in the Marvel Studios film Thor: The Dark World. He portrayed the character Malko in the fifth season of Game of Thrones. In 2015 it was reported that Akinnuoye-Abaje voices the lead character of Bilal, a film about the life of Bilal Ibn Rabah set to be released in the second half of the year. In 2016, he co-starred in the DC Comics film Suicide Squad, as the Batman villain Killer Croc.

In 2012, Akinnuoye-Agbaje said he had been developing a film about his life, which he also planned to direct. It is called Farming, a reference to the practise of Nigerian parents "farming out" their children to white UK families. In 2017, he announced that casting on the film had begun with Damson Idris in the lead role as Enitan, Kate Beckinsale as his abusive, neglectful foster mother, and Gugu Mbatha-Raw as his teacher and mentor. The film won the Michael Powell Award at the Edinburgh Film Festival for Best British Feature and Best Performance in a British Feature for Idris.

In 2021, Akinnuoye-Agbaje narrated an immersive audiovisual tour for the Roman Colosseum written by Simon Scarrow for the BARDEUM mobile app.

== Personal life ==
Akinnuoye-Agbaje lives in Los Angeles. He is a Nichiren Buddhist and a member of the Soka Gakkai International Buddhist association.

Akinnuoye-Agbaje asked to be written off Lost, citing a desire to return to London after his foster parents' deaths and to direct a film there. He is a supporter of Arsenal F.C.

== Filmography ==
=== Film ===
Year	Title	Role	Notes
1995	Congo	Kahega	Credited as Adewalé
1995	Delta of Venus	The Clairvoyant	
1995	Ace Ventura: When Nature Calls	Hitu	Credited as Adewalé
1998	Legionnaire	Luther	
2001	The Mummy Returns	Lock-Nah	
2001	Lip Service	Sebastion	
2002	The Bourne Identity	Nykwana Wombosi	
2004	Unstoppable	Agent Junod	
2005	The Mistress of Spices	Kwesi	
2005	Preaching to the Choir	Bull Sharky	
2005	Get Rich or Die Tryin'	Majestic	
2009	G.I. Joe: The Rise of Cobra	Heavy Duty	
2010	Faster	The Evangelist	
2011	Killer Elite	The Agent	
2011	The Thing	Derek Jameson	
2012	Best Laid Plans	Joseph	
2013	Bullet to the Head	Morel	
2013	Thor: The Dark World	Algrim the Strong / Kurse	
2013	The Inevitable Defeat of Mister & Pete	Pike	
2014	Pompeii	Atticus	
2014	Annie	Nash	
2015	Trumbo	Virgil Brooks	
2015	Concussion	Dave Duerson	
2016	Bilal	Bilal	Voice role
2016	Suicide Squad	Waylon Jones / Killer Croc	
2017	Wetlands	Detective Babel "Babs" Johnson	
2018	Farming	Femi	Also director
2022	Marlowe	Cedric	
2024	The Union	Frank Pfeiffer	

=== Television ===
Year	Title	Role	Notes
1994	Red Shoe Diaries	Davis Bateman	Episode: "Written Word"
1995	New York Undercover	Cliff Ramsey	Episode: "Downtown Girl"
1996	Screen Two	Emmanuel	Episode: "Deadly Voyage"
1997	20,000 Leagues Under the Sea	Cabe Attucks	2 episodes
1997	Cracker: Mind Over Murder	John Doe	Episode: "Madwoman"
1997	Pensacola: Wings of Gold	Ambassador Odeku	Episode: "Fallout"
1997–2000	Oz	Simon Adebisi	Guest role (season 1); recurring role (season 2); main role (seasons 3-4)
1998	Linc's	Winston Iwelu	Episode: "Gangsta Rap"
2000	Enslavement: The True Story of Fanny Kemble	Joe	Television film
2005–2006	Lost	Mr. Eko	Main role (seasons 2–3)
2009	Monk	Samuel Waingaya	Episode: "Mr. Monk and the Foreign Man"
2011	Strike Back: Project Dawn	Tahir	2 episodes
2012	Hunted	Deacon Crane	Main role
2015	American Odyssey	Frank Majors	Main role
2015	Major Lazer	Major Lazer/Evil Lazer	Main voice role
2015	Game of Thrones	Malko	Episodes: "Unbowed, Unbent, Unbroken", "The Gift"
2017–2019	Tangled: The Series	Xavier the Blacksmith	Recurring voice role, 7 episodes
2017	Tour de Pharmacy	Olusegun Okorocha	Television film
2017	Ten Days in the Valley	John Bird	10 episodes
2018	Watership Down	Vervain	Miniseries; main voice role
2019	The Fix	Sevvy Johnson	Main role
2020	Moominvalley	The Hobgoblin	Voice role; 2 episodes
2021	Centaurworld	Johnny Teatime	Episode: "Johnny Teatime's Be Best Competition: A Quest for the Sash"
2022	His Dark Materials	Commander Ogunwe	Main role; season 3
2023	My Dad the Bounty Hunter	Emperor Odoman	Voice
2024	Secret Level	Bladeguard Veteran Sgt. Metaurus	Voice
2026	Euphoria	Alamo Brown	Main role; season 3

== Music videos ==
- "Talk It Over" – Grayson Hugh (1989)
- "Jealousy" – Pet Shop Boys (1991)
- "Giving Him Something He Can Feel" – En Vogue (1992)
- "Love No Limit" – Mary J. Blige (1993)
- "I Want It All Night Long" – Heather Hunter (1993)
- "You Don't Love Me (No, No, No)" – Dawn Penn (1994)

== Accolades ==
Award	Year	Category	Work	Result
Actor Awards	2005	Outstanding Performance by an Ensemble in a Drama Series	Lost	Won
Actor Awards	2016	Outstanding Performance by a Cast in a Motion Picture	Trumbo	Nominated
National Film Awards UK	2021	Best Actor	Farming	Won
NAACP Image Award	2000	Outstanding Actor in a Drama Series	Oz	Nominated
NAACP Image Award	2001	Outstanding Supporting Actor in a Drama Series	Oz	Nominated
Saturn Awards	2005	Best Supporting Actor on Television	Lost	Nominated
