= Thor: The Dark World =

2013 Marvel Studios film

- Theatrical release poster
- Directed by: Alan Taylor
- Screenplay by: Christopher L. Yost; Christopher Markus; Stephen McFeely
- Story by: Don Payne; Robert Rodat
- Based on: Thor by: Stan Lee; Larry Lieber; Jack Kirby
- Produced by: Kevin Feige
- Starring: Chris Hemsworth; Natalie Portman; Tom Hiddleston; Stellan Skarsgård; Idris Elba; Christopher Eccleston; Adewale Akinnuoye-Agbaje; Kat Dennings; Ray Stevenson; Zachary Levi; Tadanobu Asano; Jaimie Alexander; Rene Russo; Anthony Hopkins
- Cinematography: Kramer Morgenthau
- Edited by: Dan Lebental; Wyatt Smith
- Music by: Brian Tyler
- Production company: Marvel Studios
- Distributed by: Walt Disney Studios Motion Pictures
- Release dates: October 22, 2013 (Leicester Square); November 8, 2013 (United States)
- Running time: 112 minutes
- Country: United States
- Language: English
- Budget: $150–272.1 million
- Box office: $644.8 million

Thor: The Dark World is a 2013 American superhero film based on the Marvel Comics character Thor, produced by Marvel Studios and distributed by Walt Disney Studios Motion Pictures. It is the sequel to Thor (2011) and the eighth film in the Marvel Cinematic Universe (MCU). The film was directed by Alan Taylor from a screenplay by Christopher Yost and the writing team of Christopher Markus and Stephen McFeely. It stars Chris Hemsworth as Thor alongside Natalie Portman, Tom Hiddleston, Stellan Skarsgård, Idris Elba, Christopher Eccleston, Adewale Akinnuoye-Agbaje, Kat Dennings, Ray Stevenson, Zachary Levi, Tadanobu Asano, Jaimie Alexander, Rene Russo, and Anthony Hopkins. In the film, Thor and Loki (Hiddleston) team up to save the Nine Realms from the Dark Elves.

Development of a sequel to Thor began in April 2011 when producer Kevin Feige announced plans for it to follow the MCU crossover film The Avengers (2012). In July, Thor director Kenneth Branagh withdrew from the sequel. Taylor was hired to replace him as director in January 2012. The supporting cast filled out that August with the hiring of Eccleston and Akinnuoye-Agbaje as the film's villains. Filming took place from September to December 2012, primarily in Surrey, England, as well as in Iceland and London. Taylor wanted the film to be more grounded than Thor, inspired by his work on Game of Thrones (2011–2019). He hired Carter Burwell to compose the score, but Marvel replaced Burwell with Brian Tyler.

Thor: The Dark World premiered at the Odeon Leicester Square in London on October 22, 2013, and was released in the United States on November 8, as part of Phase Two of the MCU. The film was a commercial success, grossing over $644 million worldwide and becoming the tenth highest-grossing film of 2013. It received praise for the performances of Hemsworth and Hiddleston, visual effects, and action sequences, but was criticized for its generic villain and lack of depth. Retrospectively, Taylor expressed dissatisfaction with the film and said Marvel substantially altered it from his original vision during post-production. Two sequels have been released: Thor: Ragnarok (2017) and Thor: Love and Thunder (2022).

== Plot ==
Eons ago, Bor—the father of Odin—wages war against the Dark Elf Malekith, who seeks to unleash a weapon known as the Aether on the Nine Realms. After defeating Malekith's forces on their homeworld of Svartalfheim, Bor sends the Aether to a hidden world that no one can reach. However, Malekith escapes with his lieutenant Algrim and a handful of Dark Elves before going into suspended animation.

In present-day on Asgard, Odin imprisons Loki for his various crimes on Earth. (Note: As depicted in The Avengers (2012). The events of Thor: The Dark World are set a year after the events of The Avengers) Meanwhile, Thor and his companions repel marauders on Vanaheim to pacify the Nine Realms following the reconstruction of the Bifröst—the "Rainbow Bridge" between realms which was destroyed two years earlier. The Asgardians learn that the Convergence, a rare alignment of the Nine Realms, is imminent; as the event approaches, portals linking the worlds appear at random.

In London, astrophysicist Dr. Jane Foster travels to an abandoned factory where such portals have appeared. Foster is teleported to the hidden world where the Aether is stored and it enters her body. Thor finds Foster and takes her to Asgard, where Odin warns that the Aether will not only kill her but herald a catastrophic prophecy. Malekith, awakened by the Aether's release, attacks Asgard searching for Foster. Thor's mother Frigga is killed trying to protect her. Thor recruits Loki, who knows of a secret portal to Svartalfheim where they plan to confront Malekith, to avenge Frigga. On Svartalfheim, Loki uses an illusion to trick Malekith into drawing the Aether out of Foster, but Thor's attempt to destroy it fails. Malekith merges with the Aether and leaves as Loki seemingly dies while killing Algrim.

Thor and Foster reunite in London with Foster's mentor, Dr. Erik Selvig. They learn that Malekith plans to plunge the entire universe into darkness by unleashing the Aether at the center of the Convergence in Greenwich. Thor battles Malekith across multiple worlds while Jane's group use their scientific equipment to transport Malekith to Svartalfheim, where he is crushed by his own ship. Thor returns to Asgard, where he declines Odin's offer to take the throne. After he leaves, Loki is revealed to be alive and impersonating Odin.

In a mid-credits scene, Volstagg and Sif visit the Collector and entrust the Aether to his care; with the Tesseract already in Asgard, they fear that having two Infinity Stones so close together would be dangerous. As they leave, the Collector states his desire to acquire the other five Stones. In a post-credits scene, Foster and Thor reunite on Earth.

== Cast ==
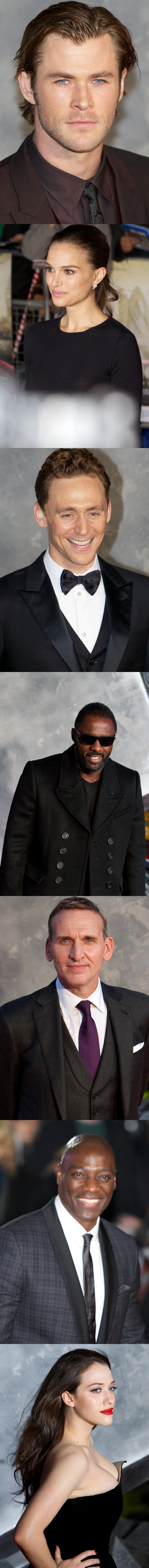
The cast of Thor: The Dark World at the world premiere in London. Top to bottom: Hemsworth, Portman, Hiddleston, Elba, Eccleston, Akinnuoye-Agbaje, and Dennings (scrollable image)
- Chris Hemsworth as Thor:
  An Avenger and the crown prince of Asgard, based on the Norse mythological deity of the same name. Hemsworth stated that the film addresses unresolved issues regarding Thor's relationships from previous films, "For Thor and Jane, there are some unanswered questions now, since obviously he didn't stop in and catch up with her in The Avengers (2012). Thor might have some explaining to do in this one. And with Loki, we get down to the major bones of our conflict with everything that's come from Thor to Avengers to now." Hemsworth added, "Thor's journey I think picks more so up from where we left the first one—About to take on the throne... and now coming to the realization of what responsibility comes with that. Also, Alan [Taylor] keeps talking about the dark side of that responsibility, and the secrets of being king or becoming sort of very political about what people need to know and what they want to know." Hemsworth especially enjoyed the role of Thor in this film as he was able to, "... break him down and find his human qualities and his vulnerable side."
- Natalie Portman as Jane Foster:
  An astrophysicist and Thor's love interest who is brought from Earth to Asgard by Thor after she is infected with a mysterious energy. Producer Kevin Feige said, "[W]hile Thor was a fish out of water on Earth in the first two films (Thor and The Avengers), this time Jane is very much a fish out of water in Asgard." Portman added, "It was a whole different adventure this time. Because Jane is the fish out of water. I didn't want to make it like Bill & Ted, or like a valley girl dumped into Shakespeareland." Portman also said the film finds Jane at a different place in her life, "Jane has moved, so she's now in London, not in Santa Fe anymore. Obviously she has gone through missing Thor and also being upset at him because he didn't come knock on her door when he was on her planet. She's definitely been getting over that and trying to move on." Hemsworth's wife Elsa Pataky stood in for Portman during the post-credits kissing scene due to a scheduling conflict.
- Tom Hiddleston as Loki:
  Thor's adoptive brother and nemesis, based on the deity of the same name, who forms an uneasy alliance with Thor against the Dark Elves. On where he wished to take the character in the film, Hiddleston said, "I'd like to take [Loki] to his absolute rock bottom. I'd like to see him yield, essentially, to his darkest instincts. Then, having hit rock bottom, maybe come back up. I think the fascination for me about playing Loki is that, in the history of the mythology and the comic books and the Scandinavian myths, is he's constantly dancing on this fault line of the dark side and redemption." Hiddleston recalled, "When I met Alan [Taylor], he asked me how I thought I could do Loki again without repeating myself and I remembered talking with Kevin Feige when we were on the Avengers promotional tour. I said, 'OK, you've seen Thor and Loki be antagonistic for two films now. It would be amazing to see them fight side by side. I've been the bad guy now twice, so I can't be again, or otherwise I shouldn't be in the film. So we have to find a new role for me to play."
- Stellan Skarsgård as Erik Selvig:
  Foster's mentor and colleague. Skarsgård said, the film finds Selvig in a "disrupted mode" explaining, "Having a god in your head for a while creates some psychological problems", referring to the character's ordeal following The Avengers.
- Idris Elba as Heimdall:
  The all-seeing, all-hearing Asgardian sentry of the Bifröst Bridge, based on the mythological deity of the same name. Elba said he has a larger role in the sequel, "In the new film we're going to get to know Heimdall the Asgardian a bit better, and we're going to get to know Asgard a bit better. I can't say too much, but the expansion of Thor in his world is going to be huge. My part was very small and functional in the first film".
- Christopher Eccleston as Malekith:
  The ruler of the Dark Elves of Svartalfheim. About Malekith's motivation, Eccleston said, "There is a kind of tragic quality to his quest. Because he's lost his wife, he's lost his children. He's lost everything. And he returns for revenge. And the agent for his revenge is the Aether. If he gets hold of that, he is omnipotent." Eccleston continued, "What I thought about a great deal was revenge—there's huge amounts of revenge. One quote is: 'When you seek revenge, be sure to dig two graves.' I did a film called Revengers Tragedy where I played a guy called Vindici—from the word 'vindictive'—and he is the distillation of revenge. So, in a way, that was what I had to think of: how revenge can make you absolutely monomaniacal—though you're still trying to make it recognizably motive-led. It's just the personification of movie evil." However Taylor stated that many scenes involving Malekith's backstory had to be cut from the film to make it more efficient. Eccleston revealed that he speaks an invented language for the film explaining, "The Elvish language is definitely based on European languages. I think there's probably some Finnish in there. It does have its logic and its rhythms. It also has many syllables and it's very difficult to do while remaining naturalistic. It's been a particular challenge for us but hopefully it gives the film some complexity and variety." Eccleston also said the role required six hours of make-up and 45 minutes in wardrobe.
- Adewale Akinnuoye-Agbaje as Algrim / Kurse:
  A Dark Elf and Malekith's trusted and loyal lieutenant who is transformed into a monstrous creature in order to destroy Thor. Akinnuoye-Agbaje described Kurse as "an amalgamation of a bull and a lava-like creature. He has very animalistic tendencies but with this insatiable and unstoppable power. As an actor, that's one of the hardest things to embody. You have to realize you are probably the most powerful thing you could imagine. And you have to be that. You can't pretend, so that when you face Thor, it's real." Akinnuoye-Agbaje stated the role required three hours of make-up a day and had to put on heavy duty prosthetics explaining, "The outfit weighed about 40 pounds. I'm sure there will be a certain amount of CGI but a good 80% was me in that suit." About the character Akinnuoye-Agbaje said, "I suppose Algrim and Kurse would be the quintessential baddies, but in reality they are what I perceive as the scorn and the victims of the story. They are the elves who have basically lost their planet and their race to another race, the Asgardians. Here is a man/alien who places a noble objective beyond his own life and I think there is something extremely inspiring about that because he looks at the bigger picture and sees himself as a means to that end." Akinnuoye-Agbaje added, "I worked with director Alan Taylor in trying to maintain Algrim's humanity all the way throughout Kurse's transformation, so that even when you see Kurse the beast, you can still relate to him as being Algrim inside. And symbolically we did that by keeping the same piercing blue eyes throughout."
- Kat Dennings as Darcy Lewis:
  A political science major who is interning for Foster. Her role in the film was expanded from the comic relief sidekick role she played in the first Thor film. Dennings said her character is "really bad at real science in this first movie. In the second movie, she's more interested, but she still doesn't know anything about it. She loves Jane, she really wants Jane and Thor to be together. It's almost like her own little soap opera that she watches."
- Ray Stevenson as Volstagg:
  A member of the Warriors Three, a group of three Asgardian adventurers who are among Thor's closest comrades, known for both his hearty appetite and wide girth. About the character Stevenson said, "He's got a heart the size of a planet that he wears on his sleeve, so he's like a big kid." Regarding Volstagg's role in this film, Stevenson said, "Volstagg is struggling, he has a brood, [the Warriors Three] are fighting for hearth and home as much as for the idea of Asgard itself. That's where he has trouble." Explaining, "He's all too aware of how potentially threatening this new enemy is on both the home front and the battlefield."
- Zachary Levi as Fandral:
  A member of the Warriors Three, characterized as an irrepressible swashbuckler and romantic. Levi replaced Joshua Dallas in the role due to Dallas's commitment on Once Upon a Time. Levi had been up for the role in the first film, but bowed out due to his commitment on Chuck. Levi compared the character to Flynn Rider, the character he played in the animated feature, Tangled, "Fandral is a little similar to Rider in some ways... He's like this Lothario. He's like Errol Flynn. He loves ladies, as do I". Regarding the dynamic of the Warriors Three, Levi said, "The Warriors Three are here to support Thor. We are his confidants, his best friends. We've all grown up together in a lot of ways and fought many a battle together, escaped death. To me it's the way best friends ought to be—they're there when you need to talk and they're there if you don't want to talk, and they're there if you need to escape from your father's place in a flying skiff!"
- Tadanobu Asano as Hogun: A member of the Warriors Three, native of Vanaheim, primarily identified by his grim demeanor.
- Jaimie Alexander as Sif:
  An Asgardian warrior, Thor's childhood friend and Foster's romantic rival, based on the deity of the same name. Alexander said there is more character development for Sif and the film explores the Sif-Thor relationship. Alexander elaborated, "I really tried to bring a little bit more vulnerability in this film. Sif is very much in love with Thor and very much cares about his well-being. So she kicks a lot of butt in this movie but she also opens her heart a lot."
- Rene Russo as Frigga:
  The wife of Odin, queen of Asgard, mother of Thor, and adoptive mother of Loki, based on the mythological deity of the same name. Russo said that her role was expanded and explores Frigga's relationship with Loki, "You know, they cut me [down] in the first film. Kenneth Branagh sent me a nice note, because he understood, he's an actor. You move on, what are you going to do? But I think they're going to need a good mom in the next film. Loki needs his mom. I have a lot of compassion for [Loki]. But we might have to have a conversation about what he just did".
- Anthony Hopkins as Odin:
  The king of Asgard, father of Thor, and adoptive father of Loki, based on the deity of the same name, who disapproves of Jane Foster being in Asgard. Regarding Thor's relationship with his father, Hemsworth said, "[T]he conflict between Thor and Odin was so great in the first one... so, certainly they disagree as I think they always will at times but there's a far greater respect from each other. So it becomes, I guess, a more mature conversation, but there's more at stake this time, too. It's not sort of just their individual egos, the whole universe is at stake." As to his approach Hopkins said, "I just play Odin like a human being, with maybe a little more dimension. I grow a beard, look hopefully impressive and keep it as real as possible."

Additionally, Alice Krige portrays Eir, an Asgardian physician, while Talulah Riley plays an Asgardian nurse. Chris O'Dowd plays Richard, a suitor of Jane Foster's. Benicio del Toro, who plays Taneleer Tivan / The Collector in Guardians of the Galaxy (2014), appears in a mid-credits scene with Ophelia Lovibond, who plays his aide Carina. Jonathan Howard plays Ian Boothby, Darcy's intern. Tony Curran plays Bor, Odin's father, based on the deity of the same name. Clive Russell plays Tyr, based on the deity of the same name. Richard Brake portrays a captain in the Einherjar. Chris Evans makes an uncredited cameo appearance as Loki masquerading as Captain America, while Thor co-creator Stan Lee makes a cameo appearance as a patient in a mental ward.

== Production ==
=== Development ===
"In both cases, it's using the conceit of a fantastical, alien world to make fresh what is really a domestic drama. In Game of Thrones, seeing Tyrion battle with his sister Cersei, seeing the relationships between children and their fathers... It's all the stuff we're interested in at a psychological level because we're living it all the time. But it takes place in this otherwise fantastical, foreign realm. I think the same thing is true in Thor. The brilliant thing Ken Branagh did in launching it was making it very much a story about two brothers, a story about brothers competing for the love of their father. So it's small, confined and human at the same time it's this blown-out, intergalactic world."

— Alan Taylor, director of Thor: The Dark World and several episodes of Game of Thrones

In April 2011, before the release of Thor (2011), Marvel Studios president Kevin Feige stated that following The Avengers (2012), "Thor will go off into a new adventure." Kenneth Branagh, director of Thor, responded to his comments, saying, "It is kind of news to me. Here's what I would say to that: It's that I'm thrilled they're that confident. I shall wait for the audience to tell us whether there should be a second one, and then if that's a nice conversation to be had [among] all of us, that'd be thrilling. But I've got too much Irish superstitious blood in me to assume that Thor 2 will happen. But if Marvel says so, then I guess it must be true". Feige later explained that Marvel Studios would gauge how well Thor did at the box office before announcing sequels, but stated, "Don Payne is working on story ideas for a part two. We've got various options with Ken [Branagh] to discuss coming back, but right now the focus is on the first one. Don is, slowly but surely, thinking about where to take the character next should we be so lucky".

In June 2011, Walt Disney Studios set a July 26, 2013, release date for the Thor sequel with Chris Hemsworth reprising his role as the title hero. It was also reported that Branagh would not be returning as director but would likely be involved in a producing capacity. The Los Angeles Times cited the long commitment necessary for a special effects-heavy epic and the pressure to start the script process right away as reasons for Branagh's departure, although he was initially enthused by the chance to direct the sequel. Branagh noted, "It was a long time [making the first film] and they were way too quick for me to get straight back into another, [but] it was a pleasurable experience and a film I'm very proud of". Branagh had actually wanted to direct the sequel, but not right after the first film due to Marvel's shoots and post-productions being intense whereas Marvel wanted production to start immediately right then and there, so he told Feige that he didn't "have it" in himself and both Feige and the cast were very understanding that Branagh needed a break, letting him go from the project, who understood Marvel's need to start with the project as soon as possible. The following day, Marvel formally hired Payne, one of the credited writers of the first film, to script the sequel. An early version of the film planned to feature Hela as the film's antagonist. However, Marvel Studios producer Craig Kyle explained that the Creative Committee from Marvel Entertainment was driving most of the decisions for the film and did not want a female villain because they did not believe they could sell toys based on her to young boys. In August, Brian Kirk entered early negotiations to direct the Thor sequel. The film would have marked Kirk's first time directing a big-budget motion picture, after having directed television series for HBO, Showtime and the BBC, including Game of Thrones (2011–2019).

In September 2011, Tom Hiddleston confirmed he would return in the sequel, speculating that in the film, "[Loki will] have to take responsibility for what he's done". Patty Jenkins, the director of Monster (2003) and the pilot episode of AMC's The Killing (2011–2014), entered early negotiations with Marvel Studios and Disney to direct the film, after Kirk had passed due to contractual sticking points that arose during negotiations. Later in the month, Feige stated the sequel would "take Thor literally to other worlds" and would "primarily be the journey of that character, of he and Jane Foster and how the new dynamic with his father is working out, as well as what are the broader stakes for The Nine Worlds". On October 13, 2011, Marvel confirmed that Jenkins would direct the sequel and Natalie Portman would return to star. Disney also moved the release date for the film to November 15, 2013.

=== Pre-production ===
"The main difference I have [from Branagh's approach] is really to do with look and tone. Things look really dirty. The first Thor was quite shiny and it was a very conscious, smart choice. When I came in, I wanted to get more of a sense of the Norse mythology: the Viking quality, the texture and weight of the history. He's a superhero, but he's been around for thousands of years. His dad is god!"

— Alan Taylor

In December 2011, Jenkins exited the project, citing "creative differences". She stated, "I have had a great time working at Marvel. We parted on very good terms, and I look forward to working with them again". Jenkins felt she could not have made a good film "out of Thor 2 because I wasn't the right director... I could have made a great Thor if I could have done the story that I was wanting to do. But I don't think I was the right person to make a great Thor out of the story they wanted to do." Jenkins had intended to create a film based on the premise of Romeo and Juliet, where Jane was stuck on Earth with Thor forbidden to come save her. After Thor eventually does travel to Earth, he and Jane would have discovered that Malekith was "hiding the dark energy inside of Earth because he knows that Odin doesn't care about Earth, and so he's using Odin's disinterest in Earth to trick him".

Three days later, it was reported that Marvel was looking at Alan Taylor and Daniel Minahan as prospective directors to replace Jenkins, and were also in the midst of hiring a writer to rewrite Don Payne's script, with the shortlist of possible writers consisting of John Collee, Robert Rodat and Roger Avary. At the end of the month, Alan Taylor, best known for directing episodes of the HBO fantasy series Game of Thrones, was chosen to direct the sequel. Feige mentioned Taylor's work on the series Mad Men (2007–2015), Boardwalk Empire (2010–2014) and Game of Thrones as reasons for his hiring, saying "With Alan's direction we got a few more layers of patina, of texture, of reality into our golden realm." As Feige looked at what worked for the first Thor film and thought what he could retool from that, Taylor decided to "bring some Game of Thrones to it" in order to make a darker and more grounded sequel in comparison to Branagh's work in the previous film. By January 10, Marvel Studios had commissioned screenwriter Rodat to rewrite the sequel and Hiddleston stated that filming was expected to begin in London in the summer of 2012. Hemsworth later confirmed that filming was scheduled to begin in August. Hemsworth also revealed that the film would have a more Viking-influenced feel, elaborating "I think the science fiction element to Thor ... the danger is it falls a little bit into the world of it's 'tough to throw a light to.' I think of big waterfalls and mountains and a Viking influence, where the Norse mythology kind of grew from. Having that in Asgard is going to make it all the more special and that's what Alan [Taylor] wants to bring to it." Feige said "while the relationship between Loki and Thor certainly has changed [after the events of the movie The Avengers] and has progressed, a lot of Thor 2 is picking up where it left off in terms of Jane, who you just saw for a moment on a computer monitor, and also what's been going on in the Nine Realms without the Asgardians being able to use the Bifrost." Feige also said that while Loki has a part, "there will be a different villain, another big villain".

In May 2012, Mads Mikkelsen began talks to play one of the villains in the film and Anthony Hopkins, who played Odin in the first film, committed to returning in the sequel. Benedict Cumberbatch, who eventually joined the film series as Stephen Strange / Doctor Strange, was also in the running to play Malekith the Accursed. At the end of the month, Disney moved up the release date for the film a week ahead of the previous date to November 8, 2013. By June 2012, much of the first film's supporting cast was confirmed to return, including Idris Elba, Jaimie Alexander, Ray Stevenson and Stellan Skarsgård. Also in June, Joshua Dallas announced that he would not be reprising the role of Fandral. Dallas had initially intended to return, but had to bow out due to his commitment on the television show, Once Upon a Time (2011–2018), and Zachary Levi was cast in his place. Levi was originally up for the role in the first film but scheduling conflicts with Chuck (2007–2012) forced him to drop out.

In July 2012, Mikkelsen stated he would not be appearing in the sequel due to prior commitments, "That's not happening unfortunately. I had a meeting with [the filmmakers], but it was a bit too late and then Hannibal came in...It's just not happening". At the 2012 San Diego Comic-Con, it was announced that the film would be titled Thor: The Dark World. At the end of the month, residents near Bourne Wood in Surrey, England were notified that a film going by the working title, Thursday Mourning would be filming in the area. In August of that year, Christopher Eccleston entered final negotiations to play Malekith, and the film was scheduled to shoot in Iceland, where Taylor shot parts of Game of Thrones. By August 22, Kat Dennings was hired to reprise her role as Darcy Lewis and Adewale Akinnuoye-Agbaje was cast as Algrim. At the end of the month, film crews for Thursday Mourning began set construction at Stonehenge near Amesbury, England.

=== Filming ===
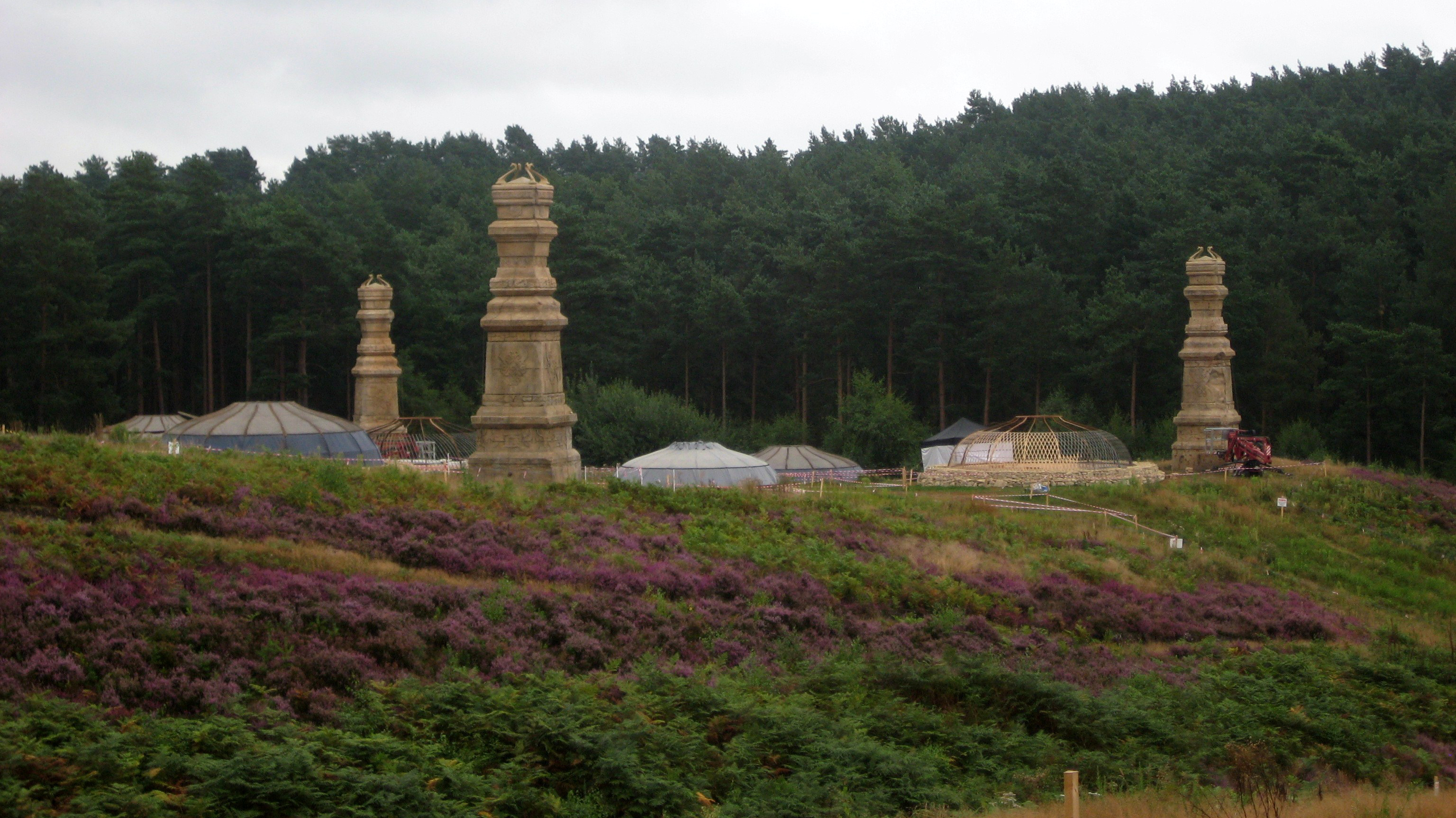
Film set for Thor: The Dark World at Bourne Wood, Surrey, England

Principal photography began on September 10, 2012, in Bourne Wood, Surrey, England, under the working title Thursday Mourning. A few weeks later, Clive Russell was cast as Tyr, and Richard Brake was cast as an Einherjar captain. At the end of the month, Jaimie Alexander was injured on the London film set, after she slipped while walking in the rain. On October 12, 2012, production moved to Iceland with filming taking place in Dómadalur, Skógafoss, Fjaðrárgljúfur and Skeiðarársandur. Iceland Review described the shoot as being among the most extensive film projects to have ever taken place in Iceland. The film's official synopsis was released, which revealed that Christopher Yost and Christopher Markus and Stephen McFeely had also contributed to the screenplay. Markus and McFeely said Feige had approached them in between writing drafts for Captain America: The Winter Soldier (2014) to work on the Dark World script. Three days later, Disney announced that the film would be released in 3D. In late October, filming commenced at the Old Royal Naval College in Greenwich, London. Filming also took place at Shepperton Studios and Longcross Studios in Surrey between October and December 2012. Other filming locations included Wembley, Borough Market, Hayes and Stonehenge. Alexander tweeted that principal photography wrapped on December 14, 2012. In a 2013 report on film production costs for films from FilmL.A. Inc., indicated a gross budget of $170 million, with a UK tax offset of $17.3 million for Thor: The Dark World. In 2016 Disney company accounts stated the budget spend was $237.6 million on Thor: The Dark World but $37 million of this was offset by payments from the UK tax authority.

Kramer Morgenthau, who worked with Taylor on Game of Thrones, was brought in as the director of photography. Morgenthau said, "We wanted a grittier, boots-on-the-ground feeling, inspired by what Alan and I had done on Game of Thrones. We wanted the realms to feel grounded, like a real place, while at the same time respecting the magical 'planet of the Gods' feeling and theme." Thor: The Dark World was Morgenthau's first time shooting a feature film digitally. For the film, Morgenthau chose the Arri Alexa Plus, although he tested with the Sony F65 but found the Alexa to be more pleasing. In addition to the Alexa, Red Epic and Canon EOS 5D Mark II cameras were used for second unit filming. With the Alexa, Morgenthau used Panavision anamorphic lenses. Morgenthau said, "The lenses brought some of the magic and mystery of photochemical back to digital, that big-movie look." Morgenthau also stated that Thor: The Dark World was easily the most technically complex project that he has worked on but said, "It's all the same concept and the same principles as in a smaller film. You just scale it up. You do a lot more prep. We had three months of prep and loads of time to pre-rig stages. Part of it is having a really good crew—it's definitely not a one-man show."

=== Post-production ===
In April 2013, McFeely said that "a lot" of writers had contributed to the film's script, and he and Markus were uncertain if they would receive final screenwriting credit on the film; Markus and McFeely along with Yost received final screenwriting credit, with Payne and Rodat receiving story credit. In July 2013, Dennings told reporters that the film was about to head into reshoots. In August, Taylor said he shot extra scenes with Hiddleston and was about to shoot more with Hopkins. Taylor explained that it was all a part of the "Marvel process" saying, "We're doing full scenes, scenes that were not in the movie before. We're adding scenes, creating scenes, writing scenes for the first time. The one [involving Loki] was a fun connective scene... We realised how well Loki was working in the movie, and we wanted to do more with him. So it was that kind of thing, it was like, 'Oh, we could do this, we could jam this in here' because he's such a wonderful guy to watch do his stuff." Also in August, IMAX Corporation and Marvel Entertainment announced that the film would be digitally re-mastered into the IMAX 3D format and released into IMAX 3D theaters internationally beginning October 30, 2013.

Taylor said The Avengers writer/director Joss Whedon rewrote several scenes in the film explaining, "Joss came in to save our lives a couple of times. We had a major scene that was not working on the page at all in London, and he basically got airlifted in, like a SWAT team or something. He came down, rewrote the scene, and before he got back to his plane I sort of grabbed him and said, 'And this scene and this scene?' And he rewrote two other scenes that I thought had problems." In October 2013, Tony Curran tweeted that he would be portraying Odin's father, Bor, in a flashback sequence. In November 2013, Feige stated that the film was intended to be the conclusion of the "Loki trilogy", which examined the relationship of Thor and Loki throughout Thor, The Avengers and this film. Loki was originally intended to die in the film, however, after test audiences did not believe he was actually dead, Marvel Studios decided to alter the character's ending. The film's mid-credits scene was directed by James Gunn, the director of Marvel Studios' Guardians of the Galaxy (2014). The film underwent multiple changes during the reshoots and editing process, with Taylor believing his initial version "had more childlike wonder", including starting the film with children, and an overall "more magical quality". He noted the reshoots "inverted" the original plot in certain ways, such as Loki no longer dying.

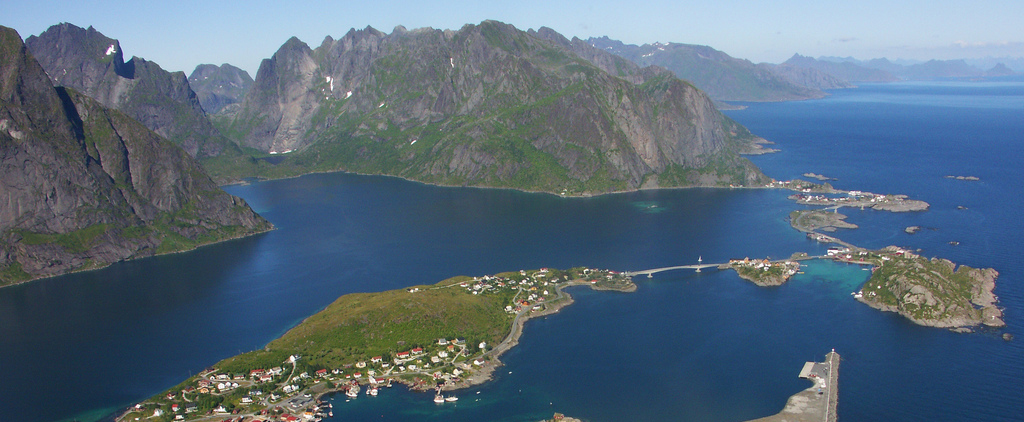
Photo of the Lofoten islands off the coast of Norway, taken in July 2008

The same islands used in the film with CG Asgardian structures added by Double Negative

The film's visual effects were completed by seven visual effects studios, including Double Negative and Luma Pictures. Blur Studio was the main visual effects studio behind the film's prologue sequence taking place 5,000 years before the start of the film, on the Dark Elves homeworld of Svartalfheim. The sequence consisted mostly of computer graphics with live-action shots interwoven throughout. The use of CGI allowed for greater freedom of movement by the characters as the live-action costumes were too constrictive.

Taylor wanted Asgard in this film to have a more natural look than its predecessor. To achieve this, crews filmed the coast of Norway with an Arri Alexa camera for three days in a helicopter, capturing six hours of footage. Double Negative then embedded their CG rendering of Asgard on shots of the natural landscape. Double Negative visual effects supervisor Alex Wuttke said, "The benefit of that is that you have some real-world terrain to work with – so you have buildings that have to convey natural features. Then from there we went in there populating the terrain with different buildings." For scenes taking place on Svartalfheim, production filmed in Iceland with Double Negative adding ruins, mountains, Dark Elf ships, and skies.

For the shot of the levitating truck, which was used in the film to demonstrate the strange phenomena brought on by the coming of the alignment of the worlds, filmmakers attached a cement truck to a large hydraulic rig, which could be programmed to change speed and movement. In order to create Algrim's transformation into Kurse, Double Negative morphed live-action performances of Adewale Akinnuoye-Agbaje as both Algrim and Kurse. Double Negative then added in smoke and lava-like effects.

The film's climactic battle sequence takes place through the nine worlds by the use of portals. Visual effects supervisor Jake Morrison said, "We ended up calling this 'time toffee', so as you punch through from one realm to another it's almost like cling film or a slightly gelatinous membrane you have to pass through. It bends a little bit then rips and spits the person out. The other thing we wanted to do was to make sure it was quite fast from an editorial point of view. In the fight scenes there are times when Thor and Malekith are portaling all over the place, quite frankly. We made sure we always kept up the momentum and never stopped the fight. It was a way of making sure the audience weren't conscious there was an effect going on."

== Music ==
In August 2012, Patrick Doyle said that he had discussions with the director about potentially returning to score the film. By April 2013, Carter Burwell had been hired to compose the score, but by the following month he left the film over creative differences. In June 2013, Marvel hired Brian Tyler, who scored Iron Man 3 (2013), to replace Burwell. Tyler said the previous film had an "attitude and [was] grounded in limitations" whereas the Thor film allowed for "all-out regal themes that could be as epic as I could make them." The composer described The Dark World as "science fiction meeting classic medieval war", leading to a score that drew from works of both genres such as Star Wars and The Lord of the Rings. Azam Ali is a featured vocalist on the score. The soundtrack was released digitally on October 28, 2013.

== Marketing ==
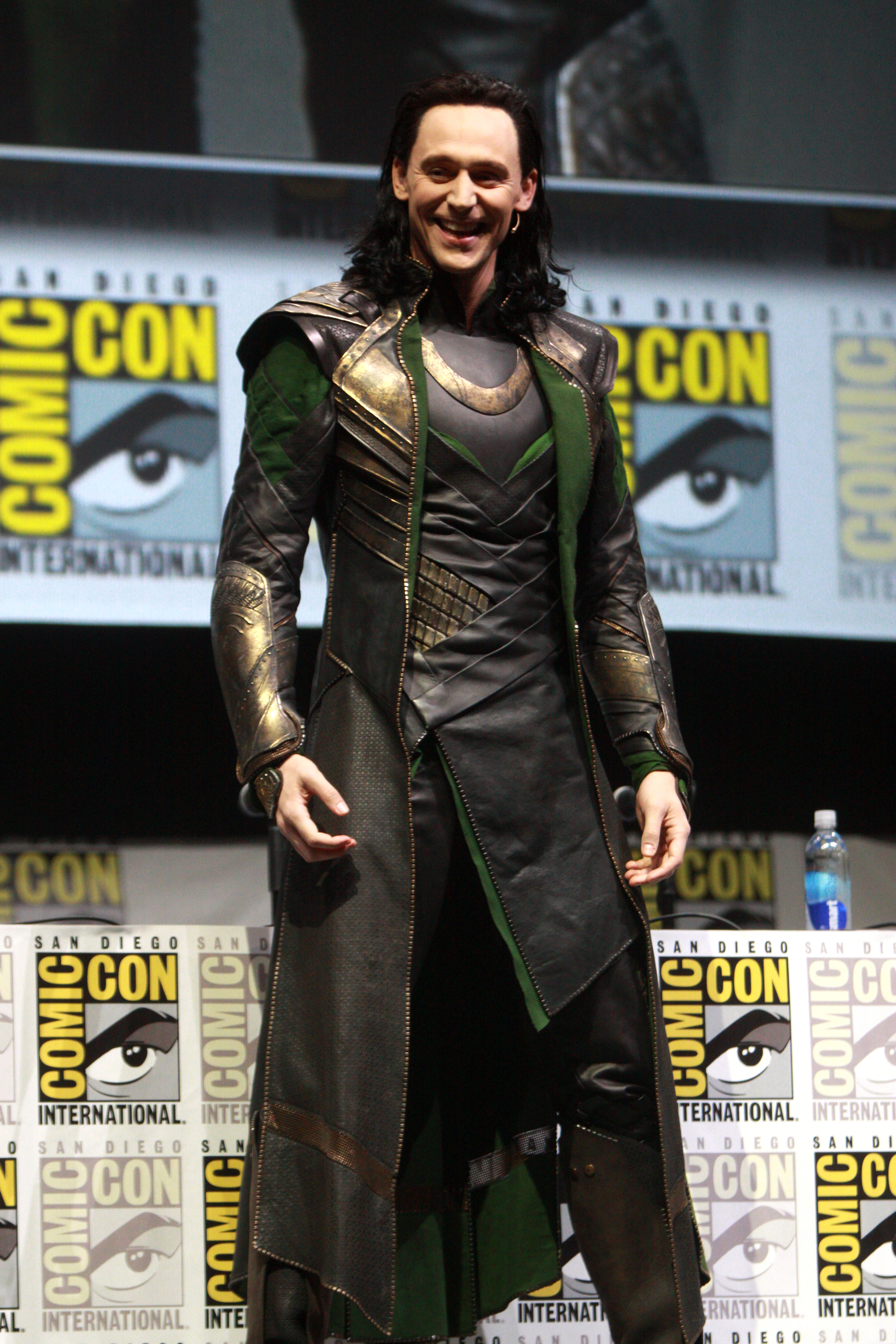
Hiddleston as Loki at the 2013 San Diego Comic-Con to promote the film

In March 2013, Marvel announced the release of a two-issue comic book prelude by writers Craig Kyle and Christopher Yost and artist Scot Eaton in June 2013. In April 2013, Marvel released the first trailer for Thor: The Dark World. Forbes said, "This trailer fits nicely into that larger marketing push for Marvel's brand. It puts all of the recognizable characters from the first film front and center, presents the action as a team event reminiscent of the Avengers, and once again Loki—who was quite popular with audiences—makes an appearance." The Los Angeles Times said, "Evident throughout the trailer is director Alan Taylor's influence; the Game of Thrones director's hand can be seen in the battle sequences, and Asgard—a bright and shiny kingdom under Thor director Kenneth Branagh—seems grittier in the sequel." In July at the 2013 San Diego Comic-Con, Hiddleston introduced footage from the film to audiences in character as Loki. Also in July, Gameloft announced that a mobile video game titled, Thor the Dark World: The Official Game, would be released in conjunction with the release of the film in November.

The theatrical poster for the film was released in early August 2013. Kirsten Acuna of Business Insider criticized the poster for its lack of originality, noting its similarities to one of the posters of Iron Man 3, both of which included the female lead clinging to the male lead, with both looking in opposite directions, antagonists prominently displayed in the background and supporting characters featured "on the side". Additionally, Marvel released a second trailer for the film as part of YouTube's Geek Week. Forbes said, "this 150-second trailer is basically just an extended version of last April's 106-second teaser" and that "this trailer fails to showcase what's new this time around... making audiences question if they really don't have much else to offer." The Los Angeles Times said, that the trailer suggests "an ominous, epic scale for the sequel" and that "the collaboration between Thor and Loki promises to be especially interesting." Later in the month, producer Kevin Feige and cast members Tom Hiddleston, Natalie Portman and Anthony Hopkins presented additional footage at Disney's D23 Expo.

Also in August 2013, Disney announced plans to promote the film with an attraction at Disneyland. The attraction called Thor: Treasures of Asgard, located next to the Stark Industries exhibit inside Innoventions in Tomorrowland, opened on November 1, 2013, and features displays of Asgardian relics and transports guests to Odin's throne room, where they are greeted by Thor. The eighth episode of Marvel's Agents of S.H.I.E.L.D., titled "The Well", takes place in the aftermath of the events of Thor: The Dark World. It first aired on November 19, 2013. Jaimie Alexander reprised her role as Sif in the Agents of S.H.I.E.L.D. episode "Yes Men", which aired on March 11, 2014.

== Release ==
=== Theatrical ===
The world premiere of Thor: The Dark World took place on October 22, 2013, at the Odeon Leicester Square in London. The film was released theatrically in the UK eight days later, on October 30. The film held its North American premiere at the El Capitan Theatre in Hollywood, Los Angeles, and was released into U.S. theaters on November 8, 2013. Thor: The Dark World is part of Phase Two of the MCU.

=== Home media ===
Thor: The Dark World was released by Walt Disney Studios Home Entertainment for digital download on February 4, 2014, and on Blu-ray Disc, 3D Blu-ray, and DVD on February 25, 2014. The physical media release includes deleted scenes, extended scenes, a gag reel, audio commentary by the cast and crew, and a Marvel One-Shot short film entitled All Hail the King, featuring Ben Kingsley reprising his role as Trevor Slattery from Iron Man 3.

The film was also collected in a 13-disc box set, titled "Marvel Cinematic Universe: Phase Two Collection", which includes all of the Phase Two films in the Marvel Cinematic Universe. It was released on December 8, 2015.

== Reception ==
=== Box office ===
Thor: The Dark World earned $206.4 million in North America and $438.4 million in other markets for a worldwide total of $644.8 million. It surpassed the gross of its predecessor after just 19 days of its release. Deadline Hollywood calculated the film's net profit as $139.4 million, when factoring together all expenses and revenues for the film.

Thor: The Dark World made an estimated $7.1 million in Thursday night showings, more than double the midnight gross of its predecessor. On Friday, November 8, 2013, the film topped the box office with $31.9 million (including Thursday night earnings), which is 25% higher than the original film's opening-day gross. Through Sunday, the film remained at the No. 1 spot with $85.7 million, which is a 30% increase over its predecessor's opening weekend. This was the largest November opening for a film distributed by Disney, surpassing The Incredibles. Thor: The Dark World topped the box office in North America during its first two weekends, before being overtaken by The Hunger Games: Catching Fire in its third weekend.

On its midweek opening day of Wednesday, October 30, 2013, Thor: The Dark World earned $8.2 million from 33 territories, including the United Kingdom and France, where it opened higher than its predecessor. During its first three days, the film earned $45.2 million, and by the end of the weekend, after expanding into three more territories, it totaled $109.4 million over five days, finishing in first place in all 36 countries. Its largest openings were recorded in China ($21.0 million), the United Kingdom ($13.8 million), and France ($9.94 million). It topped the box office outside North America on its first three weekends of release. In total earnings, its largest markets are China ($55.3 million), Russia and the CIS ($35.7 million), Brazil ($27.7 million), and the United Kingdom ($26.2 million).

=== Critical response ===
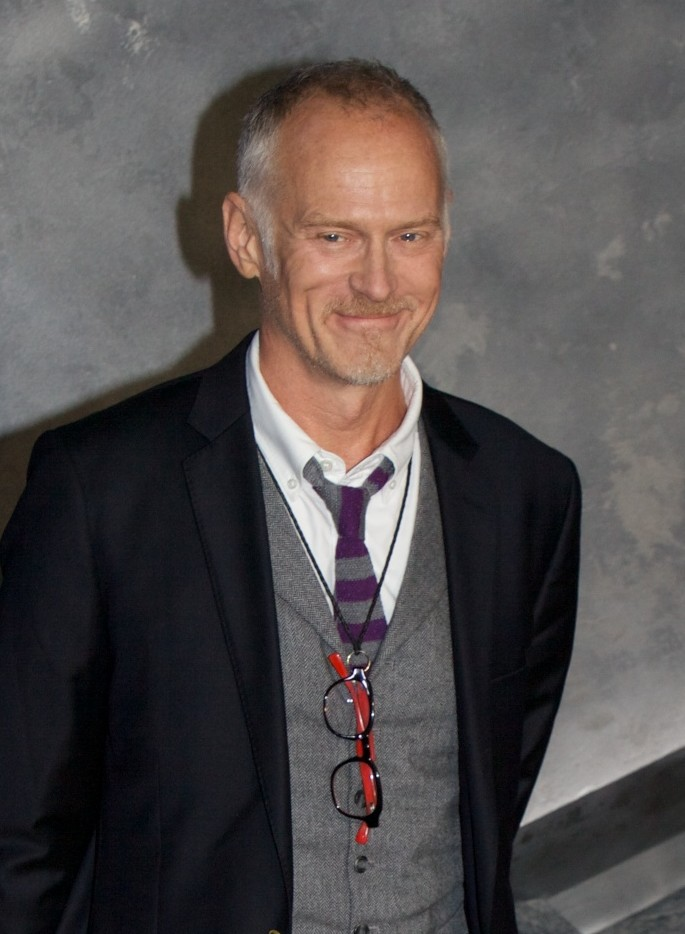
Taylor at the world premiere of Thor: The Dark World in London

The review aggregator Rotten Tomatoes reported an approval rating of 67%, with an average score of 6.2/10, based on 289 reviews. The website's consensus reads, "It may not be the finest film to come from the Marvel Universe, but Thor: The Dark World still offers plenty of the humor and high-stakes action that fans have come to expect." It was the lowest-rated MCU film on Rotten Tomatoes until the release of Eternals in 2021. Metacritic, which uses a weighted average, assigned a score of 54 out of 100 based on 44 reviews, indicating "mixed or average" reviews. Audiences polled by CinemaScore gave the film an "A−" average, based on a grading scale ranging from A+ to F.

Ben Child of The Guardian said, "Thanks to Hiddleston and Hemsworth's impressive collective charisma, Thor: The Dark World is far from a franchise killer." Justin Chang of Variety wrote, "This robust, impersonal visual-effects showpiece proves buoyant and unpretentious enough to offset its stew of otherwise derivative fantasy/action elements." Alonso Duralde of TheWrap said, "Thor: The Dark World delivers the goods—action, otherworldly grandiosity, romance, humor—above and beyond its predecessor". Simon Abrams, writing for RogerEbert.com said, "There's just enough tension and humor in Thor: The Dark World to make the film's otherwise listless proceedings worth watching, but only just."

Conversely, Tim Robey of The Daily Telegraph said, "It feels entirely made by committee—the definition of house style, without a personal stamp in sight." Leslie Felperin of The Hollywood Reporter said, "Although director Alan Taylor manages to get things going properly for the final battle in London, the long stretches before that on Asgard and the other branches of Yggdrasil are a drag, like filler episodes of Game of Thrones but without the narrative complexity, mythical heft or all-pervading sexiness." Michael Phillips of the Los Angeles Times described Thor: The Dark World as having the "same old threats of galaxy annihilation spiced with fairly entertaining fish-out-of-water jokes". Jeannette Catsoulis of The New York Times said, "the battle scenes are as lacking in heat and coherence as the central love story".

Taylor expressed dissatisfaction with the finished film and blamed its mixed reception on changes Marvel Studios made during post-production, which he felt conflicted with his creative vision. In 2015, he called working on The Dark World a "particularly wrenching" experience, and said in 2021 that the experience made him hesitant to continue directing. Taylor expressed interest in creating a director's cut similar to Zack Snyder's Justice League (2021), though he observed that Marvel was likely not interested in it.

=== Accolades ===
Year	Award / Film Festival	Category	Recipient(s)	Result	Ref(s)
2014	IGN Best of 2013	Best Comic Book Adaptation Movie	Thor: The Dark World	Nominated	
2014	People's Choice Awards	Favorite Year-End Movie	Thor: The Dark World	Nominated	
2014	ABFF Hollywood Awards	Artist of the Year	Idris Elba (also for Pacific Rim and Mandela: Long Walk to Freedom)	Nominated	
2014	Empire Awards	Best Supporting Actor	Tom Hiddleston	Nominated	
2014	Saturn Awards	Best Comic-To-Film Motion Picture	Thor: The Dark World	Nominated	
2014	Saturn Awards	Best Supporting Actor	Tom Hiddleston	Nominated	
2014	Saturn Awards	Best Costume	Wendy Partridge	Nominated	
2014	Saturn Awards	Best Make-Up	Karen Cohen / David White / Elizabeth Yianni-Georgiou	Nominated	
2014	Saturn Awards	Best Special / Visual Effects	Jake Morrison / Paul Corbould / Mark Breakspear	Nominated	
2014	MTV Movie Awards	Best Shirtless Performance	Chris Hemsworth	Nominated	
2014	MTV Movie Awards	Best Hero	Chris Hemsworth	Nominated	
2014	MTV Movie Awards	Favorite Character	Loki	Nominated	
2014	Golden Trailer Awards	Best Action TV Spot	Thor: The Dark World	Nominated	
2014	BET Awards	Best Actor	Idris Elba (also for Mandela: Long Walk to Freedom)	Nominated	
2014	Teen Choice Awards	Choice Movie: Sci-Fi/Fantasy	Thor: The Dark World	Nominated	
2014	Teen Choice Awards	Choice Movie Actor: Sci-Fi/Fantasy	Chris Hemsworth	Nominated	
2014	Teen Choice Awards	Choice Movie Actress: Sci-Fi/Fantasy	Natalie Portman	Nominated	

== Sequels ==
=== Thor: Ragnarok ===
Thor: Ragnarok was released on November 3, 2017, directed by Taika Waititi. Eric Pearson and Craig Kyle & Christopher Yost wrote the screenplay, with Kevin Feige again producing. Hemsworth, Hiddleston, Hopkins, Elba, Asano, Levi, and Stevenson reprise their roles as Thor, Loki, Odin, Heimdall, Hogun, Fandral, and Volstagg, respectively, while Mark Ruffalo and Benedict Cumberbatch appear as Bruce Banner / Hulk and Doctor Strange respectively, reprising their roles from previous MCU films. Cate Blanchett, Tessa Thompson, Jeff Goldblum and Karl Urban join the cast as Hela, Valkyrie, Grandmaster, and Skurge, respectively.

=== Thor: Love and Thunder ===
A fourth film titled Thor: Love and Thunder was released on July 8, 2022. Hemsworth, Thompson, and Elba reprised their roles, with Portman, Alexander, Dennings, and Skarsgård returning after not appearing in Ragnarok. Portman portrayed her character taking on the mantle of Thor, similar to the comics. Additionally, Chris Pratt, Pom Klementieff, Dave Bautista, Karen Gillan, Vin Diesel, Bradley Cooper, and Sean Gunn reprise their roles as Guardians of the Galaxy members Peter Quill / Star-Lord, Mantis, Drax the Destroyer, Nebula, Groot, Rocket, and Kraglin Obfonteri. Christian Bale joined the cast as the villain Gorr the God Butcher.
