= Malekith the Accursed =

- Malekith as depicted in Thor: God of Thunder #13 (2013); Art by Ron Garney.

Publication information
- Publisher: Marvel Comics
- First appearance: Thor #344 (June 1984)
- Created by: Walt Simonson

In-story information
- Alter ego: Malekith
- Species: Dark Elf
- Place of origin: Svartalfheim
- Team affiliations: Dark Council
- Notable aliases: Angel, Master of the Hounds, Malcolm Keith, Dark Elf, Balder the Brave, The Butcher of Thor
- Abilities: Superhuman strength, speed, agility, stamina, reflexes, durability and intellect Wields Dark Faerie magic Ability to summon the Wild Hunt

Malekith the Accursed (/ˈmæləkɪθ/) is a fictional character appearing in American comic books published by Marvel Comics. He is the ruler of the Dark Elves of Svartalfheim and has come into conflict with Thor. Malekith has often wielded the Casket of Ancient Winters, which enables him to generate endless amounts of ice.

Christopher Eccleston portrayed the character in the Marvel Cinematic Universe film Thor: The Dark World (2013). Additionally, Quinton Flynn and James C. Mathis III voiced Malekith in guest appearances in The Avengers: Earth's Mightiest Heroes and Hulk and the Agents of S.M.A.S.H. respectively.

== Publication history ==
Created by Walt Simonson, Malekith first appeared in Thor #344–349 (June–November 1984). He subsequently appeared in issues #363 (January 1986), 366-368 (April–June 1986), 485–487 (April–June 1995), and 489 (August 1995) of Thor.

He made guest appearances in X-Force and Cable Annual 1997 and Heroes for Hire #14 (August 1998) before again battling Thor in Thor vol. 2 #29-32 (November 2000–February 2001). He later appeared in The Incredible Hercules #134 (November 2009) and #136 (December 2009).

In 2012, Jason Aaron revived him in the Thor: God of Thunder series and he became the main antagonist in the "All New, All Different" Thor volume 4 and the crossover event The War of the Realms.

== Fictional character biography ==
Malekith is a Dark Elf who grew up during a time of war in Svartalfheim. Twelve of his older brothers died during a war with trolls. His mother eventually sold him as a slave for two sacks of snake livers and half a barrel of pickled toads. He worked as a body burner destroying the bodies of fallen elves until he was captured by trolls. In prison, he met a wizard, who helped him escape and took him as an apprentice. Eventually, the wizard wanted to combine their powers for peace, but Malekith refused because he felt that any peace would mean that the war which forged him would have been pointless, making his existence something it was not meant to be. He kills the wizard, who before dying scarred his face. Malekith then kills his mother, taking the dogs of the Wild Hunt for his own uses.

Later, Malekith allies with Loki on behalf of the fire demon Surtur. He takes control of a number of Earth humans using special food of the faerie provided by Hela. Malekith then kills Eric Willis, guardian of the Casket of Ancient Winters, after learning of its location. As Master of the Hounds, Malekith hunts Roger Willis, Eric's son. Using Lorelei as bait, Malekith forced Thor to battle Algrim, one of his Dark Elf followers, and attempts to destroy both combatants by plunging them into magma. He then takes the Casket from Roger Willis. Malekith is defeated by Thor, but destroys the Casket, releasing its icy magic on Earth.

Malekith later disguises Loki as himself to take his place in the dungeon, while he disguises himself as Balder the Brave, who is about to be crowned ruler of Asgard. Algrim sees through Malekith's disguise and breaks his neck, apparently killing him.

Years later, Malekith is revealed to be alive. Disguising himself as Balder, he enlists Hercules to attack Alflyse, the Dark Elf Queen of the Eastern Spires, while disguised as Thor. His scheme is unraveled (partially due to the appearance of Thor disguised as Hercules), and he is easily defeated by Zeus.

Malekith, who escaped from his prison in Niflheim, rampages across the Nine Realms in a path of revenge, targeting any Dark Elf not loyal to him. Despite this fratricide, the Dark Elf Council elect him their king, as Dark Elves respect those they fear. However, the opposition to Malekith had drawn together the other races of the realms, causing a new level of understanding and cooperation. The enemies of the realms made note of this and drew together as well.

During the "War of the Realms" storyline, Malekith invades Midgard by posing as Loki and tricking Thor into heading to Jotunheim. Malekith lays destruction over Europe and plans to kill Black Knight, Union Jack, and Spitfire with the Ebony Blade, when Captain Marvel arrives with Deadpool, Weapon H, Winter Soldier, Captain Britain, Sif, and Venom) to fight against Malekith. As the War Avengers fight the Dark Elves, the Venom Symbiote tries to attack Malekith only to be absorbed into his sword. Malekith tortures the Venom symbiote and uses a dagger of living abyss to reshape it into All-Black the Necrosword, a weapon designed to kill Asgardians. Malekith summons the Wild Hunt, only for the Wild Hunt hounds and the Svartálfheim Bog Tiger to turn on him and dismember him.

Afterwards, Malekith finds himself in Niflheim, where Hela and Karnilla greet him and reveal that his Wild Hunt hounds and the Svartalheim Bog Tiger died soon after devouring him, having been poisoned by the black magic he had used to bend Venom to his will. Karnilla explains that, when she and Hela reassembled the pieces of his soul they had drawn out of the beasts' stomachs, they found the last fragment of his true self—the little boy who had suffered through his childhood as a victim of war. Hela and Karnilla tell a horrified Malekith that his punishment will be to witness his younger self spend eternity with the hounds and the Svartalheim Bog Tiger. He is then chained to a rock with his eyes sewn open by Karnilla. As Malekith begs for mercy, the Wild Hunt hounds and the Svartalheim Bog Tiger are sent through a portal to Valhalla, where they are transformed into puppies and a tiger cub respectively. They are then seen happily playing with the young Malekith. As the young Malekith has finally found peace and happiness, Malekith screams at the torment of having to watch for all eternity.

== Powers and abilities ==
Malekith has all the normal attributes of a member of the race of dark elves, although his abilities are a result of above-average development. He possesses superhuman intellect, strength, speed, stamina, durability, agility and reflexes.

As a dark elf, Malekith also has the ability to manipulate magic for a variety of effects, including teleportation, energy projection, physical malleability, flight (by transforming into mist), illusion casting, and the ability to change the shape and appearance of other beings or objects.

Malekith, like all Dark Elves, has a vulnerability to iron, which disrupts or cancels his magical spells.

== Other versions ==
=== Chrono Signature Anno Doom +128 ===
During the "One World Under Doom" storyline, Doctor Doom has Kristoff Vernard use the Time Platform to summon several superheroes from a possible future designated as Chrono Signature Anno Doom +128. One of these heroes is a version of Malekith, who joins Doom's Superior Avengers. Ava Starr states that Malekith was reborn from the draining of All-Black the Necrosword and Undrjarn the All-Weapon after Doom razed Asgard. During his fight with Annihilus, Doom transforms Malekith's body into a sword and war hammer, with Vernard taking the weapons for himself.

=== Marvel Adventures ===
Malekith appears in Marvel Adventures: The Avengers #15.

== In other media ==
=== Television ===
- Malekith the Accursed appears in The Avengers: Earth's Mightiest Heroes episode "The Casket of Ancient Winters", voiced by Quinton Flynn.
- Malekith the Accursed appears in the Hulk and the Agents of S.M.A.S.H. episode "For Asgard", voiced by James C. Mathis III. This version of Malekith and the Dark Elves were inspired to conquer other worlds due to lacking a homeworld of their own.

=== Film ===
Malekith the Accursed makes a cameo appearance in Hulk vs Thor.

=== Marvel Cinematic Universe ===
Christopher Eccleston as Malekith as he appears in Thor: The Dark World.

Malekith appears in media set in the Marvel Cinematic Universe (MCU):

- Malekith appears in Thor: The Dark World, portrayed by Christopher Eccleston. Millennia prior, this version led the Dark Elves in a war against the Asgardians using the Aether, but was defeated and presumed dead following a final battle against King Bor, who sealed the Aether. Having gone into hiding, the Dark Elves resurface in the present amidst a convergence event when Jane Foster inadvertently becomes infected with the Aether. In their quest to reclaim it and plunge the universe in eternal darkness, they lay siege to Asgard, killing Frigga. Despite being scarred by Bor's grandson Thor, Malekith eventually succeeds in extracting the Aether from Foster and fusing with it, only to be defeated and killed by Thor via a teleportation device Erik Selvig built.
- An alternate universe variant of Malekith appears in the What If...? episode "What If... Howard the Duck Got Hitched?", voiced by Steven French.

=== Video games ===
- Malekith the Accursed appears as a boss in Marvel: Avengers Alliance.
- Malekith the Accursed appears in Marvel Super Hero Squad Online.
- Malekith the Accursed appears in Marvel Heroes.
- Malekith the Accursed appears in Lego Marvel Super Heroes, voiced by Stephen Stanton.
- Malekith, based on the MCU incarnation, appears in Thor: The Dark World: The Official Game, voiced by Marc Thompson.
- Malekith appears as a playable character in Marvel: Future Fight.
- Malekith the Accursed appears in Marvel Avengers Academy.
- The MCU incarnation of Malekith appears in Lego Marvel's Avengers.
- Malekith appears as a boss in Marvel Future Revolution, voiced by Jason Spisak.

=== Miscellaneous ===
Malekith appears in the motion comic War of the Realms: Marvel Ultimate Comics, voiced by Mackenzie Gray.
