= Svartálfar =

"Black elves" who dwell in Svartalfheim

In Norse cosmology, svartálfar (O.N. "black elves", "swarthy elves", sing. svartálfr), also called myrkálfar ("dark elves", "dusky elves", "murky elves", sing. myrkálfr), are beings who dwell in Svartálfheim (Svartálf[a]heimr, "home of the black-elves"). Both the svartálfar and Svartálfaheimr are only attested in the Prose Edda, written in the 13th century by Snorri Sturluson. Scholars have noted that the svartálfar appear to be synonymous with the dwarfs and potentially also the dökkálfar ("dark elves"). As dwarfs, the home of the svartálfar could possibly be another description for Niðavellir ("dark fields").

== Attestations ==
The svartálfar are almost only attested in the Prose Edda (the word does appear in Ektors saga ok kappa hans, but is presumably borrowed from the Prose Edda). The svartálfar mentioned in Skáldskaparmál 35 are the Sons of Ivaldi, whom Loki engages to craft replacement hair for Sif, wife of the god Thor, after Loki mischievously sheared off her golden tresses. Ivaldi is often glossed as being a dwarf.

Svartálfaheimr ("world of black-elves") appears in the Prose Edda twice, in each case as the place where certain dwarfs can be found to be living: In Gylfaginning 33, the "world of black-elves" is where the dwarfs are sought by the gods to craft the fetter Gleipnir to bind the wolf Fenrir. And in Skáldskaparmál, 39, the "world of black-elves" is where Loki encounters the dwarf Andvari.

== Theories and interpretations ==
Scholars have commented that, as both attestations mentioning the beings and location appear to refer to dwarfs, svartálfr and dwarf may simply be synonyms for the same concept. Scholar John Lindow comments that whether the dökkálfar and the svartálfar were considered the same at the time of the writing of the Prose Edda is also unclear.

== See also ==
- Dökkálfar and Ljósálfar
- Elf
- Dwarf
