= Daniel Acuña =

Spanish comic book artist (born 1974)

- Born: 1974 (age 51–52)
- Area: Penciller
- Notable works: Claus & Simon; Uncle Sam & the Freedom Fighters; The Eternals

Daniel Acuña (born 1974) is a Spanish comic book artist.

== Early life ==
In college, Daniel Acuña studied painting and graduated with a degree in Fine Arts. He cites his early influences as Jack Kirby, the Romitas (Senior and Junior), Will Eisner, Simon Bisley, Kevin Nowlan, Hal Foster, and his favorite, Richard Corben, along with fine artists such as Edward Hopper, and Alfons Mucha, as well as illustrator Drew Struzan.

== Career ==
His first published work was a 22-page black and white project, Claus & Simon in Hollywood, with fellow artist Santi Arcas, which was bought by Spanish publisher La Cupula when Acuña was 22. This work was followed by Claus & Simon: Freakshow, and Claus & Simon: Disaster Box. The "Claus & Simon" series is about the adventures of a clown and an anthropomorphic dinosaur. The last story was done for the French market and later reprinted in the popular American magazine Heavy Metal (under the title Claus & Simon: Kings of Escape).

Claus & Simon increased Acuña's profile in Europe, and he received work painting the covers for European paperback reprints of Alan Moore's Supreme (#2-6), which led to Acuña's decision to try to break into the American market while still remaining active in the European comics industry.

Acuña's first work in the American comics industry was for Marvel Comics, on a miniseries for Axel Alonso that was never completed or published. DC Comics editor Eddie Berganza later hired him to paint pictures of Ravager and Blackfire for Teen Titans/Outsiders Secret Files. This work got Acuña noticed by Mark Chiarello, who suggested him to editors Mike Carlin and Joan Hilty as a cover artist for the Justice League of America and Outsiders series.

Although only doing American-market covers up until this point, Acuña made the move to interior art with Uncle Sam & the Freedom Fighters, on which he did the covers, pencils, inks, graytones and even character design, working with European colorist Javi Montes.

In late 2005, it was announced that Acuña had signed a two-year exclusive contract with DC Comics. However, in 2007 it was announced that Acuña had signed an exclusive contract with Marvel Comics, to start in 2008, and would be leaving DC Comics. Acuña had previously only done covers for Marvel; his first interior work for the publisher was The Eternals, which debuted June 2008. In 2010 Acuña drew the Black Widow ongoing series with writer Marjorie Liu. In October 2015 he and writer Nick Spencer started the series Captain America: Sam Wilson.

== Personal life ==
Acuña is currently based in Águilas, Spain.

== Bibliography ==
Interior comic work includes:

- Claus & Simon (with Santiago Arcas):
  - ... en Hollywood (In Hollywood) (La Cúpula, graphic novel, 1998)
  - Feria de monstruos (Freakshow) (La Cúpula, graphic novel, 2000)
  - Cajón de Sastre (The Disaster Box) (La Cúpula, graphic novel, 2001)
  - "Rois de l'evasion (Kings of Escape)" (in L'Écho des savanes #237-244, anthology, 2004)
- 9-11 Volume 1: "Nothing but You on My Mind" (with Art Brooks, anthology graphic novel, Dark Horse, 2002)
- French Kiss Comix #5: "Plan 69 from Outer Space" (script and art, anthology, La Cúpula, 2002)
- Roy Thomas' Anthem #1, 3 (with Roy Thomas, Heroic Publishing, 2006)
- Uncle Sam and the Freedom Fighters (with Justin Gray and Jimmy Palmiotti, DC Comics):
  - "Prelude" (in Brave New World anthology one-shot, 2006)
  - Uncle Sam and the Freedom Fighters #1-8 (2006–2007)
- Green Lantern vol. 4 #18-20: "Mystery of the Star Sapphire" (with Geoff Johns, DC Comics, 2007)
- Flash (with Mark Waid, DC Comics):
  - All-Flash (final two pages, one-shot, 2007)
  - "The Wild Wests" (in vol. 2 #231-232, 2007)
- The Eternals vol. 4 #1-6 (with Daniel Knauf and Charles Knauf, Marvel, 2008–2009)
- Young X-Men #11-12: "End of Days" (with Marc Guggenheim and Rafa Sandoval, Marvel, 2009)
- Uncanny X-Men (Marvel):
  - "How I Survived Apocalyptic Fire" (with Matt Fraction, in Dark Reign: The Cabal anthology one-shot, 2009)
  - "White Queen, Dark Reign" (with Matt Fraction and Mitch Breitweiser, in Annual #27, 2009)
  - "This Strange, Unpleasant Land" (with Kieron Gillen, in vol. 2 #15-17, 2012)
- X-Men: Legacy #228-230, Annual #1 (with Mike Carey, Marvel, 2009–2010)
- New Avengers (with Brian Michael Bendis, Marvel):
  - "Siege" (with Stuart Immonen, in vol. 1 #61-62, 2010)
  - "Infinity" (in vol. 2 #8, 2011)
- Captain America #611: "Trial, Part One" (with Ed Brubaker, Marvel, 2010)
- Black Widow vol. 4 #1-5: "The Name of the Rose" (with Marjorie Liu, Marvel, 2010)
- Wolverine vol. 4 #6-9: "Wolverine vs. the X-Men" (with Jason Aaron, Marvel, 2011)
- X-Men: Schism #3 (with Jason Aaron, Marvel, 2011)
- The Avengers (Marvel):
  - "Shattered Heroes" (with Brian Michael Bendis, in vol. 4 #18-20 and 23-24, 2011–2012)
  - "The Origin of the Avengers" (with Robbie Thompson, co-feature in vol. 1 #672, 2017)
- Uncanny Avengers vol. 1 #6-11, 13, 18-22, 25 and vol. 2 #1-5 (with Rick Remender, Marvel, 2013–2015)
- Sam Wilson: Captain America #1-3, 7, 11-13, 18, 21 (with Nick Spencer, Mike Choi (#3) and Angel Unzueta (#7), Marvel, 2015–2017)
- Avengers: Standoff — Assault on Pleasant Hill Omega (with Nick Spencer and Angel Unzueta, one-shot, Marvel, 2016)
- Civil War II #8 (with Brian Michael Bendis, among other artists, Marvel, 2017)
- Secret Empire #0, 8 (with Nick Spencer, Rod Reis and Sean Izaakse (#8), Marvel, 2017)
- Marvel Legacy (with Jason Aaron and various artists, one-shot, Marvel, 2017)
- The Mighty Thor #700 (with Jason Aaron, among other artists, Marvel, 2017)
- Invincible Iron Man #600 (with Brian Michael Bendis, among other artists, Marvel, 2018)
- Black Panther (Marvel):
  - "Panther's Heart" (with Don McGregor, in vol. 5 Annual #1, 2018)
  - "The Intergalactic Empire of Wakanda" (with Ta-Nehisi Coates, in vol. 7 #1-5, 13-ongoing, 2018–...)
- Marvel Comics Presents vol. 3 #3: "Home of the Brave" (with Andrew Aydin, anthology, Marvel, 2019)
- Marvel Comics #1000: "Mystery Lessons" (with Al Ewing, anthology, Marvel, 2019)
- Doctor Strange vol. 5 #10: "Perchance" (with Mark Waid, co-feature, Marvel, 2019)

=== Covers only ===
- La Poudre aux Rêves #96, 99 (La Cúpula, 2002)
- The Outsiders #28-34, 36-41 (DC Comics, 2005–2006)
- JLA #120-125 (DC Comics, 2005–2006)
- Captain Universe/Hulk #1 (Marvel, 2006)
- Captain Universe/Daredevil #1 (Marvel, 2006)
- Captain Universe/X-23 #1 (Marvel, 2006)
- Captain Universe/Invisible Woman #1 (Marvel, 2006)
- Captain Universe/Silver Surfer #1 (Marvel, 2006)
- Doc Samson #1 (Marvel, 2006)
- Crisis Aftermath: The Battle for Blüdhaven #1-6 (DC Comics, 2006)
- The Infinite Crisis novelization (Berkley Publishing Group, 2006)
- Green Arrow/Black Canary Wedding Special #1 (DC Comics, 2007)
- The Flash: The Fastest Man Alive #7-8 (DC Comics, 2007)
- The Flash vol. 2 #235 (DC Comics, 2008)
- Hulk #1 (Marvel, 2008)
- Dark Reign: New Nation #1 (Marvel, 2009)
- The Dark Tower: Treachery #5 (Marvel, 2009)
- Wizard #209 (Wizard, 2009)
- Dark Avengers #3 (Marvel, 2009)
- Nova vol. 4 #23-28 (Marvel, 2009)
- X-Men: Legacy #225 (Marvel, 2009)
- Guardians of the Galaxy vol. 2 #17 (Marvel, 2009)
- All Winners Comics 70th Anniversary Special #1 (Marvel, 2009)
- Dark Wolverine #78 (Marvel, 2009)
- Second Coming: Prepare #1 (Marvel, 2010)
- Captain America #615.1 (Marvel, 2011)
- Fear Itself: Wolverine #1 (Marvel, 2011)
- I am an Avenger #4 (Marvel, 2011)
- FF #1-4, 8-9 (Marvel, 2011)
- The Avengers vol. 4 #21, 25 (Marvel, 2012)
- Uncanny Avengers #1 (Marvel, 2012)
- First X-Men #4 (Marvel, 2013)
- Thor: God of Thunder #1-3 (Marvel, 2013)
- The Avengers vol. 5 #3, 6, 8, 10, 12, 14, 16, 18, 20, 22-24 (Marvel, 2013–2014)
- Deadpool vol. 3 #3 (Marvel, 2013)
- Winter Soldier #14 (Marvel, 2013)
- Journey into Mystery #650 (Marvel, 2013)
- The Mighty Avengers vol. 2 #4 (Marvel, 2014)
- The Legendary Star-Lord #6 (Marvel, 2015)
- Star Wars vol. 4 #1 (Marvel, 2015)
- Sam Wilson: Captain America #5, 10, 17, 19-20 (Marvel, 2016–2017)
- Avengers: Standoff — Welcome to Pleasant Hill #1 (Marvel, 2016)
- The Avengers vol. 7 #1 (Marvel, 2017)
- Captain America: Steve Rogers #16 (Marvel, 2017)
- Invincible Iron Man vol. 3 #9 (Marvel, 2017)
- Spider-Men II #1 (Marvel, 2017)
- Star Wars vol. 4 #34 (Marvel, 2017)
- X-Men Blue #11 (Marvel, 2017)
- Falcon #3 (Marvel, 2018)
- Inhumans: Judgment Day #1 (Marvel, 2018)
- Rogue and Gambit #1 (Marvel, 2018)
- The Avengers #675 (Marvel, 2018)
- Daredevil #600 (Marvel, 2018)
- Conan the Barbarian #1 (Marvel, 2019)
- Black Panther vol. 6 #9-12 (Marvel, 2019)
- The Amazing Spider-Man vol. 5 #23 (Marvel, 2019)

Preceded by Tony Daniel	Flash artist 2007	Succeeded by Freddie Williams II
