= Detroit Steel =

- The Detroit Steel armor, piloted by Lt. Doug Johnson III, in its first appearance in The Invincible Iron Man #25 (June 2010). Art by Salvador Larocca.

Publication information
- Publisher: Marvel Comics
- First appearance: Iron Man (vol 5) #25 (June 2010)
- Created by: Matt Fraction; Salvador Larocca

In-story information
- Alter ego: Lt. Doug Johnson III; Sasha Hammer; Jayce ("Fear Itself" storyline); Keaton ("Fear Itself" storyline)
- Species: Human
- Team affiliations: Hammer Industries
- Abilities: Powered suit of armor grants: Super-strength; durability; Variety of offensive and defensive weapons including rotary cannon, rockets, giant chainsaw

Detroit Steel is a fictional suit of powered armor appearing in American comic books published by Marvel Comics, in which it is usually operated by adversaries or rivals of Iron Man. Created by writer Matt Fraction and artist Salvador Larocca, Detroit Steel first appeared in Iron Man (vol 5) #25 (June 2010) as part of the "Stark Resilient" storyline.

== Publication history ==
Detroit Steel first appeared in The Invincible Iron Man (vol 5) #25 (June 2010), the first part of the nine-part "Stark Resilient" storyline, which depicted Tony Stark's struggle to build his new company Stark Resilient, whose signature product is a car powered by the same clean repulsor technology that powers his Iron Man armor.

Writer Matt Fraction created Detroit Steel to embody jingoistic patriotism in the vein of Team America, and describes the character thus:

He is what follows in the hole left behind by Iron Man once Tony Stark leaves the world stage. Tony hasn't been around to protect the regular interests that he might have during his time running Stark Industries or running S.H.I.E.L.D. And now that he's back, he's made it clear he doesn't want to get back into the geo-political side of things necessarily. Detroit Steel is what happens in that absence. He is a sort of Blackwater-meets-NASCAR corporate-sponsored armored enhanced guy available for hire to the highest bidder for whatever cause around the round. Basically, Iron Man's worst nightmare of what he could become. An absolute perversion of everything he is.

Though the Detroit Steel armor exhibits the American flag's colors, Fraction states that the Detroit Steel armor can be repainted to reflect the colors of whatever country or corporation purchases them, from the Japanese Rising Sun Flag (which makes an appearance in The Invincible Iron Man #27) to the yellow and red colors of McDonald's. Fraction also contrasts Detroit Steel with Iron Man's Bleeding Edge armor, which debuted in the same issue, by describing the latter as "sleeker, slicker and pared down", whereas the former is "bigger and better and boisterous and loud and noisy and everything else. It's like the difference between a Porsche and a Mack Truck".

== Fictional history ==
Former United States Air Force Lieutenant Doug Johnson III is the first pilot of the Detroit Steel armor, first appearing during the "Stark Resilient" storyline. He underwent surgical modifications in order to operate the weaponized suit, and also trained the other pilots in the Steelcorps army. Hammer Industries, led by Justine Hammer and Sasha Hammer, not only wish revenge on Tony Stark for their patriarch Justin Hammer's death, but see Stark as an obstacle for their product Detroit Steel which they hope to market globally as a new soldier for the world. Justine and Sasha embark on a campaign to discredit Iron Man in the industrial market, conspiring with the corrupt Pentagon General Babbage, and staging civilian attacks in which Detroit Steel is arranged to intervene before Iron Man. Shortly after, Detroit Steel launches a surprise attack on Stark Resilient by orchestrating a remote-server air-strike unwittingly piloted by young gamers on their mobile devices, who are unaware that their actions are affecting the real world. Iron Man, War Machine, Rescue and Maria Hill stop the strike and shut down Detroit Steel.

Detroit Steel next appears in The Invincible Iron Man during the 2011 storyline "Fear Itself". Detroit Steel is deployed in Paris and confronts Mokk, who is petrifying the population of Paris. However, Mokk attacks and petrifies Detroit Steel. In the subsequent "Demon" storyline, Johnson is revealed to be alive, but is believed to be dead by the public. In the subsequent "Long Way Down" storyline, Johnson kidnaps Sasha in order to steal a Detroit Steel unit, but is killed by Sasha.

=== Detroit Steelcorps ===
The Detroit Steelcorps (otherwise known as the Steelmechs and Hammermechs) is a line of armored soldiers marketed by Hammer Industries.

During the "Stark Resilient" storyline, a fleet of unmanned flying drones aided in Detroit Steel's attack against Iron Man. Anonymous gamers were duped into believing that the missions carrying out on Hammer Industries' behalf were a playable video game via a cell phone application, in which they pretended to be Detroit Steel's "wingman".

A team of Steelmechs are piloted battlesuits which are similar to the original Detroit Steel armor and are subsequently led by Sasha into Paris, ostensibly on behalf of the U.S. and French governments, where they battle Rescue before being confronted by Mokk.

== Powers and abilities ==
Detroit Steel attacks Iron Man, from The Invincible Iron Man (Vol 2) #32 (January 2011). Art by Salvador Larocca.

According to Hammer Industries, Detroit Steel represents "the most bleeding-edge research into man/machine spinal hybrid mechanics the world has ever seen", and incorporates technology, such as C.N.S. (Controlled Exo-Enhanciles), that would eventually be used to end paralysis caused by cervical, thoracic or corticospinal injuries. The Detroit Steel suit affords its occupant considerable protection from automatic weapons and explosives, though the magically powered being Mokk was able to easily rip open the armor.

The Detroit Steel suit allows its users to fly, and usually is seen with a rotary cannon mounted on its right arm, and a specialized chainsaw on its left, which can penetrate Iron Man's Bleeding Edge armor. There are rocket-powered munitions on the suit's shoulders. The rotary cannon can be dismounted so that the soldier can carry and fire it as a traditional handheld weapon, and the Detroit Steel armor's users have been seen outfitted with other types of weapons in this manner, including both directed-energy weapons and scaled-up rifles. Sasha Hammer's Detroit Steel armor has also been depicted with a directed-energy weapon in palm of its hands. Those who pilot the Detroit Steel armor are required to undergo considerable surgical modifications, which leave implants visible on the pilot's chest. According to Justine Hammer, the company designed models for different environments and hot zones, including arctic climates and urban encounters.

== Reception ==
Alex Evans, reviewing Invincible Iron Man #33 for Weekly Comic Book Review, while praising the "Stark Resilient" storyline (which he gave a B-), found Justine Hammer and Sasha Hammer to be more effective villains than Detroit Steel, which he found to be "bland" and "boring". Evans also disliked the lack of a resolution to Detroit Steel and Iron Man's battle in Invincible Iron Man #33, though he later praised Iron Man #505, which he felt tied up that loose end. Evans was more receptive to the character's use in the subsequent storyline "The Long Way Down", saying of Invincible Iron Man #518, "The manner in which Fraction and Larroca depict the fight between Detroit Steel and Sasha Hammer was brilliant, alternating panels between the fight itself (at night) and the aftermath (the broken apartment in the daylight). It created almost a police procedural, detective feel that also served to make the whole thing a bit haunting and unsettling, which is great given how creepy 'Detroit Steel' already is".

== In other media ==
=== Television ===
- The Detroit Steelcorps appear in the Avengers Assemble episode "Dehulked", with the leader battlesuit utilized by Igor Drenkov.
- The Detroit Steel armor appears in Lego Marvel Avengers: Climate Conundrum, in which it is operated by Justin Hammer.

=== Video games ===
The Doug Johnson III incarnation of Detroit Steel appears as a playable character in Lego Marvel's Avengers.

=== Miscellaneous ===
The Detroit Steel armor appears in a Lego Marvel set, in which it is operated by Justin Hammer.
