= Shattered Heroes =

- Publisher: Marvel Comics
- Publication date: October 2011
Title(s)
Invincible Iron Man
The Mighty Thor
Journey into Mystery
The Incredible Hulk
Avengers
Avengers Academy
Battle Scars
Captain America
- Main character(s): Captain America; Hulk; Tanarus; Iron Man

"Shattered Heroes" is a comic book branding that ran through a number of books published by Marvel Comics. It began in October 2011 on issues that follow "Fear Itself" and explore a number of implications across a number of titles.

== Publication premise ==
Some of the larger implications involve:

- The separation of The Incredible Hulk from Bruce Banner and his attempts to make himself a Hulk again at any cost.
- The emergence of a new god of Thunder called Tanarus whom everyone but Loki remembers as the only God of Thunder.
- The coming together again of the Defenders.
- The emergence of Marcus Johnston, an American soldier who finds himself embroiled in a contest for his allegiance in the Marvel universe.

The mini series Fear Itself: The Fearless is unbannered but involved, as are the three Fear Itself epilogue issues while some titles will only be bannered once as part of the event, though the storyline may be ongoing for a few issues.

== Titles involved ==
- Avengers #18-21 (#22-24 unbannered; though unbannered New Avengers #16.1-23 crosses over)
- Avengers Academy #21-24 (issue #22 was also bannered as part of the X-Men: Regenesis storyline; #25–26 unbannered)
- Battle Scars #1-6
- Captain America #7-9 (#6 though unbannered leads to issue #7's story, #10 unbannered)
- Defenders #1-3 (unbannered but involved as issue #1 deals with the hammer wielded by the Hulk in Fear Itself)
- Fear Itself #7.1-7.3
- Fear Itself: The Fearless #1-12
- The Incredible Hulk #1 (#2-7 onwards is unbannered but continues the story from issue #1)
- Invincible Iron Man #510-511 (#512-515 are unbannered)
- Journey into Mystery #631-636
- The Mighty Thor #8-12
