= Peregrine (comics) =

- Peregrine as depicted in Scarlet Witch #6 (2016). Art by Marguerite Sauvage.

Publication information
- Publisher: Marvel Comics
- First appearance: Contest of Champions #1 (June 1982)
- Created by: Mark Gruenwald; Bill Mantlo; Steven Grant; John Romita Jr. Pablo Marcos

In-story information
- Alter ego: Alain Racine
- Team affiliations: Wild Pack; Champions of Europe
- Partnerships: Silver Sable
- Abilities: Talented writer Master of savate Gifted intellect Costume grants: Flight via anti-gravity devices Goggles; Radar detection devices

Peregrine (Alain Racine) is a fictional character appearing in American comic books published by Marvel Comics.

== Publication history ==
Peregrine first appeared in Contest of Champions #1 and was created by Mark Gruenwald, Bill Mantlo, Steven Grant, John Romita Jr., and Pablo Marcos.

The word "peregrine" does not mean "falcon" in French, making the name "Le Peregrine" unusual to a French reader. The word does exist in French, but is used to refer to the peregrine saltbush, a plant. In French translations of Peregine's appearances, his name was changed to "Le Faucon Pèlerin", meaning "the Peregrine Falcon".

== Fictional character biography ==
Alain Racine was born in Moulins, France. He is a writer by profession, but is a superhero, adventurer, and mercenary, using a falcon-like costume with artificial wings giving him the ability to fly.

Peregrine is introduced as a participant in the Grandmaster's Contest of Champions, where he is chosen to compete on the Grandmaster's side. Peregrine is pitted against another winged opponent, Angel, and loses due to his lack of experience.

After returning to Earth, Peregrine encounters Silver Sable, who invites him to work as a freelance operative in France. He assists Hawkeye in destroying a nuclear warhead generator stolen by the Red Skull, and freeing the Sandman—another of Sable's operatives — in the process. Peregrine later accepts an assignment from Sable International to disable a surveillance station in the Persian Gulf. He maneuvered the American navy into destroying the station.

During the Fear Itself storyline, Peregrine flies Black Widow into France when she is sent there on a mission by Steve Rogers. When Black Widow uncovers civilians taken hostage by Rapido, she has Peregrine help free them while she deals with Rapido.

During the Secret Empire storyline, Peregrine appears as a member of the Champions of Europe. With help from Squirrel Girl and Enigma, the Champions of Europe liberate Paris, France from Hydra forces.

== Powers and abilities ==
Peregrine is an athletic man with a gifted intelligence but possesses no superhuman powers. He is a talented writer, and a master of savate (French kick-boxing).

Peregrine wears a suit of synthetic stretch fabric that incorporates an anti-gravity generator system which emits and controls anti-gravitons, enabling him to counteract gravitational attraction. He wears glider-wings that contain small hydrazine and nitrous oxide-fueled jet turbines that afford propulsion. Using all this equipment allows Peregrine to fly with a range of about 200 miles (320 km) before exhausting his fuel supply. He wears goggles to protect his eyes while in flight, and carries radar detection devices.

While working as part of the Wild Pack, Silver Sable International supplied Peregrine with special weaponry including ammonium bromide gas grenades (to induce unconsciousness), napalm bolas, taser darts, thermite grenades, and an electromagnetic scrambler.
