= Serpent (character) =

Marvel Comics supervillain

- The Serpent as depicted in Fear Itself #5 (October 2011). Art by Stuart Immonen and Wade Von Grawbadger.

Publication information
- Publisher: Marvel Comics
- First appearance: Fear Itself #1 (April 2011)
- Created by: Stuart Immonen; Matt Fraction

In-story information
- Full name: Cul Borson
- Species: Asgardian
- Place of origin: Asgard
- Team affiliations: Worthy
- Notable aliases: Serpent, God of Fear
- Abilities: Superhuman strength, speed, agility, stamina and durability Healing factor Shapeshifting; Magic manipulation Longevity; Fear consumption

The Serpent (Cul Borson) is a supervillain appearing in American comic books published by Marvel Comics. Known as the Norse God of Fear, he is the brother of Odin and the uncle of Thor and Loki as well as a foe of both relatives, as well as the Avengers.

== Publication history ==
The Serpent first appeared in Fear Itself #1 (June 2011), and was created by Stuart Immonen and Matt Fraction.

== Fictional character biography ==
Cul Borson first appears in the 2011 "Fear Itself" storyline, when he is freed from his underwater prison by Sinthea Shmidt / Red Skull, who possesses the Hammer of Skadi. Upon emerging as an old man, the Serpent claims that he is the true All-Father of Asgard, and not Odin. The Serpent prepares Skadi's army and calls the Hammers of the Worthy, which he sends to Earth, transforming a number of superhuman beings into the Worthy, his henchmen who will help him spread fear and chaos across the globe: Juggernaut as Kuurth, Breaker of Stone; the Hulk as Nul, Breaker of Worlds; Attuma as Nerkodd, Breaker of Oceans; Titania as Skirn, Breaker of Men; Grey Gargoyle as Mokk, Breaker of Faith; Absorbing Man as Greithoth, Breaker of Wills; and the Thing as Angrir: Breaker of Souls. As the Worthy attack a number of high-profile cities on Earth, the Serpent is rejuvenated by the fear experienced by the global citizenry, restoring his youth. When Thor appears at his stronghold to confront him, the Serpent confirms to Thor that he is the Serpent destined by prophecy to kill Thor, and not the Midgard Serpent. The Serpent reveals that he is Odin's brother and Thor's uncle. He dispatches Thor to Manhattan, which lies in ruins following an attack by Skadi, Nul and Angrir, who then attack Thor.

The Serpent confronts the Avengers and breaks Captain America's shield with his bare hands before teleporting away. Thor manages to dispatch Nul, who is transformed back into Thing, but is seriously wounded, and transported to Asgard to recuperate. In an attempt to destroy Odin and his followers, the Serpent and his followers appear in Broxton, Oklahoma to use Heimdall's observatory to trave to Asgard. They are confronted by the heroes of Earth, who stage a last stand to stop them.

When the healed Thor appears, the Serpent transforms into a giant serpent and confronts him while the Avengers fight the Worthy with weapons that Iron Man made in Asgard's workshops. Thor sacrifices himself to kill him, fulfilling the prophecy. Following Thor's funeral, Odin takes the Serpent's corpse to Asgard, casts out the other Asgardians, and locks himself alone with the body until the end of time, blaming himself for not preventing Thor's death.

In the 2014 "Original Sin" storyline, Odin resurrects the Serpent, who reforms and becomes Asgard's Royal Inquisitor and Minister of Justice. He attempts to take Mjolnir from Thor, but is defeated by her, Thor, and Frigga.

In the 2019 storyline "The War of the Realms", the Serpent discovers that Malekith is using a version of Bifrost. Cul relays this to Odin, and resolves to remain in Svartalfheim to discover how it works. After spending months studying it, Cul steals some explosives from the Swamp Mines and throws them towards the Bridge. He then discovers that Malekith has enslaved Dark Elf children to mine the explosives. After freeing the children, Serpent sacrifices himself by fending off the guards so that the children can escape.

== Powers and abilities ==
Cul Borson possesses all the conventional attributes of an Asgardian god. However, as the son of Bor, many of these attributes are significantly superior than those possessed by the majority of his race. He possesses sufficient superhuman strength to shatter Captain America's shield with his bare hands. He possesses the ability to manipulate magic as he was able to transport, revive the dead and transform into a giant serpent. As the God of Fear, he could consume fear to empower himself.

== Reception ==
In 2020, CBR.com ranked the Serpent 9th in their "10 Marvel Gods With The Highest Kill Count" list.

== Other characters named Serpent ==
Several unrelated characters have been called Serpent:

=== Iko Akakowa ===
Iko Akakowa is a spy who worked for Imperial Japan during World War II and was known as Serpent. He possessed poisonous glands underneath his fingernails which he uses to poison others. Serpent fought the Young Allies and committed seppuku with his own poison upon his defeat.

=== Fin Fang Foom ===
Fin Fang Foom was once called "Serpent".

=== Mephisto ===
Mephisto was called the "original Serpent" by the Serpent Society, who worshiped him.

=== Symbiote version ===
The Serpent is a Symbiote created after Meridius fused the Symbiote matter left behind by Bedlam's child with melted Promethium. It found its way to where Donald Blake was imprisoned and merged with him.

== In other media ==
- The Cul Borson incarnation of Serpent appears in Guardians of the Galaxy, voiced by Robin Atkin Downes. This version planted the World Tree before he was imprisoned in the Darkhawks' realm. In the present, the Serpent escapes his prison, attacks Asgard, and poisons the World Tree. Groot later uses the Dragonfang sword to purify the World Tree, causing the Serpent to age to dust.
- The Cul Borson incarnation of Serpent appears in Marvel: Avengers Alliance.

== See also ==
- Nidhogg
