= Rapido (comics) =

- Rapido on the cover of The Punisher Vol. 2, #65 (June 1992); Art by Doug Braithwaite

Publication information
- Publisher: Marvel Comics
- First appearance: The Punisher Vol. 2, #65 (June 1992)
- Created by: Dan Abnett; Andy Lanning; Doug Braithwaite

In-story information
- Alter ego: Roussel Dupont
- Species: Human Cyborg
- Place of origin: Earth-616
- Team affiliations: French Foreign Legion; Batroc's Brigade
- Abilities: Cyborg enhancement grants: Chain gun as his right arm

Rapido (Roussel Dupont) is a supervillain appearing in American comic books published by Marvel Comics. Created by Dan Abnett, Andy Lanning, and Doug Braithwaite, the character made his first appearance in The Punisher Vol. 2, #65 (June 1992). He is an enemy of the Punisher.

== Publication history ==
Rapido was introduced in the "Eurohit" story-arc that ran through The Punisher Vol. 2, #64-70, and returned in the "Suicide Run" installments The Punisher War Journal Vol. 1, #61 and The Punisher War Zone Vol. 1, #23, as well as the "Eurohit" sequel contained within The Punisher Annual Vol. 2, #7. After an absence of seventeen years, the character reappeared in the one-shot Fear Itself: The Black Widow, and a storyline that occurred in Captain America and Iron Man #633-635.

Rapido also received entries in the handbooks Marvel Encyclopedia #5 (which revealed his real name) and Civil War: Battle Damage Report.

== Fictional character biography ==
A former member of the French Foreign Legion, Rapido at some point left the service, became a mercenary, and had his right arm replaced with a mechanical one that has a chain gun in place of a hand.

When the Kingpin enacts a plot to use the Channel Tunnel as a means of establishing an international crime network, he hires Rapido to assist him, along with fellow assassins Snakebite, Chauffard, and Batroc the Leaper. When the Punisher travels to Europe and begins investigating the Chunnel plan, Rapido and the other mercenaries ambush him and his companion, Morgan Sinclair, and shoot their helicopter down over the Vosges. Rapido and the other hitmen then go after a group of Swiss and Italian mobsters in Geneva, but their attempt to kill all of them is foiled by the Punisher and Sinclair. Rapido and his allies track the Punisher and Sinclair down to Spain, but the duo escapes them again, so Rapido and the others reconvene in London.

When the Kingpin arranges a meeting of the heads of various European crime syndicates in central London, Rapido and the other killers in his employ are instructed to assassinate them, so that their organizations can be taken over by the Kingpin. After the Punisher breaks into the building that the sit down is taking place in, Rapido battles one of the vigilante's colleagues, Outlaw. Rapido pursues the vigilante through the edifice, and is incapacitated when Outlaw tricks him into falling through a weakened floor and leaves him to be arrested by the Special Air Service.

Rapido subsequently travels to the United States to attend a crime lord summit that is being held in Manhattan Tower. When the Punisher infiltrates the building, Rapido and the other criminals attempt to ambush him, only for the Punisher to reveal that he has a dead man's switch that can activate a semtex bomb that will demolish Manhattan Tower. In the chaotic scrimmage that follows, the Punisher headlocks Rapido, jams a handgun into his mouth, and orders him to open fire on the other criminals, who are forced to shoot Rapido.

Rapido survived the gunfire and the Punisher blowing up Manhattan Tower, dug himself out of the rubble, and re-allied with Chauffard. With the help of the Architect, Chauffard attempts to reestablish the Chunnel plan, and instructs Rapido to assassinate Morgan Sinclair, Jack Oonuk, and Outlaw, who fake their deaths with the assistance of the Punisher. When the Punisher and his accomplices attack the Chunnel operation, Rapido is left bedridden with numerous broken bones after being hit by a train while fighting the Punisher.

Years later, Rapido is reluctantly hired by the French government to help patrol France's borders, the country having become a hotspot destination for super powered American immigrants in light of the events of Civil War.

During the Fear Itself storyline, terrorists hire Rapido to obtain information pertaining to France's nuclear weapons arsenal through an ancillary Ministry of Defense ops room that is hidden beneath a Marseille cathedral. Rapido obtains the intel, sends it to his employers, and is then defeated by Black Widow and Peregrine.

Rapido next appears antagonizing Captain America and Iron Man as a member of the latest incarnation of Batroc's Brigade.

A Rapido Life Model Decoy is later shown among an army of hero and villain-based LMDs that the Chameleon had created using an abandoned S.H.I.E.L.D. program called Project: Doppelganger.

== Powers and abilities ==
Along with the training he received while a part of the French Foreign Legion, Rapido also has a chain gun in place of a right arm. The gun is capable of firing bullets, grenades and lasers, and can be used as both a bludgeoning weapon and a battering ram.
