= Ulik =

Fictional character appearing in Marvel comics

- Thor battles Ulik on the cover of Thor #252 (Oct. 1976).

Publication information
- Publisher: Marvel Comics
- First appearance: Thor #137 (Feb. 1967)
- Created by: Stan Lee (writer); Jack Kirby (artist)

In-story information
- Alter ego: Ulik
- Species: Rock Troll
- Team affiliations: Roxxon Energy Corporation
- Notable aliases: Tanarus: God of Thunder
- Abilities: Superior hand to hand combatant Superhuman strength, stamina and durability Night vision Use of pounders

Ulik is a fictional character appearing in American comic books published by Marvel Comics. He usually appears as an adversary of Thor. Ulik was created by Stan Lee and Jack Kirby, and first appears in Thor #137 (February 1967).

Debuting in the Silver Age of Comic Books, Ulik has appeared in over four decades of Marvel continuity, principally as a member of Thor's rogues' gallery. The character has also appeared in other Marvel-related products including animated television series, toys, and trading cards.

== Publication history ==
Writer Mike Conroy commented on Ulik's debut in Thor #137 (Feb. 1967): "In a strip as steeped in Norse mythology as Marvel's Thor, it was no surprise to come across a troll as big and mean as Ulik." Created as a physical equal for the Thunder God, the Asgardian troll Ulik became a perennial villain for the hero.

== Fictional character biography ==
Ulik belongs to a race of Rock Trolls who live in the dimension of Asgard in Nornheim. Like all trolls, Ulik has an innate hatred of the Asgardians, as they were driven underground by King Odin and forbidden to live on the surface. Being the strongest of his kind, Ulik is commanded by Troll King Geirrodur to steal Thor's enchanted hammer Mjolnir, leading to an extended series of battles with him. Ulik proves to be a match for Thor, enhancing his already formidable strength with knuckle dusters made of uru (the same metal of which Mjolnir is made). He nearly defeats Thor after going into the berserker state of mind but is mystically returned to his realm by Geirrodur when the Asgardians threaten to intervene. He then manages to trap Thor in his Donald Blake form; after failing to summon Mjolnir, Blake tells him to strike his cane again. When Ulik does so, Blake suddenly grabs it, transforms into Thor, and defeats him.

Much later, maddened and feral, Ulik is given weapons made from the same forge which created Mjolnir. He becomes the lead in Loki's attack on Asgard; this snowballs into the true Ragnarok. Ulik is killed after Captain America throws an iron hammer into his mouth.

During the "World War Hulks" storyline, Ulik is resurrected and is shown to have gone on a multi-state drinking binge. He ends up destroying a train bridge, with the disaster being averted by A-Bomb and Marlo Chandler. When Ulik starts choking Marlo, he is defeated by A-Bomb.

After Thor dies during the "Fear Itself" storyline, Ulik replaces him as Tanarus, the new Thunder God, endorsed by the All-Mothers of the Vanir (Freyja, Gaea, and Idunn). Exploiting a glamour charm given by Karnilla, Ulik retroactively rewrites history to put himself in Thor's place. Only a few individuals like Karnilla and the current juvenile incarnation of Loki are aware of the deception. Tanarus' blunt nature in contrast to the honor of the true Thor allows Heimdall and Sif to realize that something is wrong relatively quickly, culminating in the returned Thor easily defeating Tanarus after his resurrection.

Ulik becomes a consultant to the Minotaur of Roxxon. First, he helps Roxxon destroy Broxton, Oklahoma, right below Asgard, then he offers advice and battle against the Frost Giants of Jotunheim. This fails as the Frost Giants take over the Roxxon facility.

== Powers and abilities ==
Ulik possesses superhuman strength, stamina and durability, and has the ability to see into the infrared range of the spectrum, allowing complete night vision. He is also a superior hand-to-hand combatant. In battle, Ulik uses "pounders", metal bands forged from uru and worn over the hands like brass knuckles.

== In other media ==
=== Television ===
- Ulik appears in The Avengers: Earth's Mightiest Heroes, voiced by Troy Baker.
- Ulik appears in Avengers Assemble, voiced by Kevin Michael Richardson.
- Ulik appears in the Ultimate Spider-Man two-part episode "The Avenging Spider-Man", voiced again by Kevin Michael Richardson.

=== Video games ===
- Ulik appears as a miniboss in Marvel: Ultimate Alliance, voiced by Fred Tatasciore.
- Ulik appears in Thor: God of Thunder, voiced by Steve Blum.
- Ulik appears as a boss in Marvel Future Revolution, voiced by Isaac C. Singleton Jr.

=== Merchandise ===
An action figure of Ulik was produced as part of Hasbro's Marvel Legends line in 2022.
