= The Invincible Iron Man (comics) =

Marvel comic book series

- Cover to The Invincible Iron Man #1, art by Salvador Larroca

Publication information
- Publisher: Marvel Comics
- Schedule: Monthly
- Format: Ongoing series
- Genre: Superhero
- Publication date: July 2008 – October 2012
- No. of issues: 60 plus 1 Annual; reverted to original numbering after issue #33 to issue #500
- Main character: Iron Man

Creative team
- Written by: Matt Fraction
- Artist: Salvador Larroca

The Invincible Iron Man is a comic book series written by Matt Fraction with art by Salvador Larroca, published by Marvel Comics and starring the superhero Iron Man. After issue #33 The Invincible Iron Man returned to its original numbering with issue #500. It concluded with issue 527, succeeded by the Marvel NOW!–imprinted Iron Man series.

== Story arcs ==
=== "The Five Nightmares" (#1–7) ===
Iron Man fights Ezekiel Stane, son of Obadiah Stane; who sought to avenge the death of his father by destroying Stark Industries. Ezekiel targets Stark by first becoming an international terrorist, using suicide bombers; with technology based upon Iron Man. In an attempt to deal with the source of the devastation, Stark ventures into an A.I.M. facility and is faced with MODOG (Mental Organism Designed Only for Genocide), though after defeating him with ease and tossing his body into space; Stark realizes another individual is responsible. Also targeted by Stane is the Triumph Division—a group of seven superheroes originating from the Philippines; who are killed by a suicide bomber.

=== "World's Most Wanted" (#8–19) ===
With his Extremis powers failing, Stark uploads a virus to destroy all records of the Registration Act, thus preventing Norman Osborn from learning the identities of his fellow heroes. The only copy remaining is in Stark's brain, which he is trying to delete bit by bit while on the run in one of his extra armors. As Osborn has him hunted as a fugitive, Stark travels worldwide on his quest to wipe out his mental database, going so far as to inflict brain damage on himself. When Osborn personally catches up to the debilitated Stark and beats him savagely, Pepper Potts broadcasts the beating worldwide, costing Osborn credibility and giving Stark public sympathy. Stark goes into a vegetative state, having previously granted Donald Blake (alter ego of the Norse-god/superhero Thor) power of attorney. During this catatonia, Pepper receives a holographic message from Tony revealing a way to 'reboot' his brain, returning him to normal. While Blake and Captain America resolve to use this method, Tony offers to remain in his near brain-dead state, if it would make things easier for Pepper.

=== "Stark: Disassembled" (#20–24) ===
A message is displayed to Pepper by the armor in which Tony reveals there is a way to reboot his mind but offers to remain like that if it makes things easier. He also says Osborn cannot copy his or S.H.I.E.L.D. technology and that it will take Captain America, Thor, and himself to clean up the mess Osborn will do once he goes crazy. Donald Blake (Thor) and Captain America (Bucky) decide to use it even though Pepper doubts Tony can come back when so many others cannot. Meanwhile, Madame Masque hires the Ghost to kill Tony. In Stark's subconscious, he is trapped in a never-ending loop where machines attack when he attempts to dig for something before the scenario resets. In his subconscious, a hallucination of his parents (Howard and Maria) help him find an iron chest which was what he was digging for. He puts it on, but nothing happens. In the real world, Tony's recording outlines how to reboot him, involving installing Pepper's electromagnet onto his chest, jack the hard drive Maria Hill recovered from Futurpharm into his head and then use Thor's thunder to boot his brain. However, when it happens, there is no result, so Doctor Strange is called in to help Tony come back while the Ghost arrives, only to fail. Tony's brain is successfully rebooted; however, the reset point was sometime before the Civil War, leaving Stark with no knowledge of the current status quo.

=== "Stark Resilient" (#25–33) ===
Justine Hammer unleashes the mechanical hero Detroit Steel on Earth. Tony keeps sifting through the ashes of his old life and tries to rebuild who he is and what he does. War Machine struggles to be a man of war in peacetime. Meanwhile, Pepper Potts is on the road to recovery, but nothing is free from complication in Tony Stark's world and that means the debut of an all new Rescue. The gang at Stark Resilient burns the midnight oil against an impossible deadline, but they are not the only ones manufacturing a world-changer. Justine Hammer is building an army of bombers as air support for Detroit Steel. And all of Tony Stark's plans are in danger as the greatest foe he has ever faced is revealed.

=== "Fear Itself" (#504–509) ===
The machinations of the Red Skull's daughter, Sin, unleashed the long forgotten Asgardian god known only as the Serpent upon Midgard to fulfill an eons-old prophecy. His Worthy—eight mighty, mystically empowered warriors—spread fear in his name. With the planet seized by panic and chaos erupting worldwide, one of Tony Stark's oldest, most dangerous enemies stands transformed as one of the Worthy, and an unsuspecting Paris will pay the ultimate price. Now, Iron Man must fight a war on two fronts: one against the hammer-wielding Grey Gargoyle, and another against the soul-numbing dependency that has cost him so much.

=== "Demon" (#510–515) ===
Having regressed into drinking during the events of Fear Itself, Tony now finds himself forced by the U.S. Government to hand over his suit's biometric data, which would force him to relinquish his role as Iron Man due to evidence of his drunken state. Meanwhile, the Mandarin, Justine Hammer, and Ezekiel Stane work together in order to take down Stark Resilient, and Stark himself, while upgrading his old foes with new technology.

=== "Long Way Down" (#516–520) ===
As a result of Justine Hammer and the Mandarin's machinations, Tony is forced to wear a limiter, a device that can deactivate the Bleeding Edge armor at the discretion of a U.S. Army general and Justine Hammer. He chooses to continue, still struggling with his alcoholism and sheer exhaustion. The armor itself is also pushed to its limits, still heavily damaged from the events of Demon, the cracked RT note drawing the Mandarin's attention. Stark plays along with Justine Hammer's ploy and stages for James Rhodes to 'die' at the hands of Melter. In reality, this is the beginning of Tony's plan to strike back.

Stark decides to take a leave of absence from the Avengers, having fought with Ms. Marvel and Captain America. Resilient is revealed to have been infiltrated by the Spymaster, in the guise of Pimacher. The Spymaster professes he has been impersonating him since Resilient began and tries to murder Cababa, choosing to make it quick, as he was really in love with him. Stark enacts the next step in his plan to get back at his enemies by quitting being Iron Man. In order to have the limiter removed, Stark purges the suit from his body and replaces the cracked RT node. He then equips James Rhodes with a new Iron Man armor that is S.H.I.E.L.D., Oscorp, A.I.M. and Stark Tech equipped. He denies any involvement with this new Iron Man and keeps his identity shielded from all, including Pepper.

=== "The Future" (#521–527) ===
Tony Stark is missing and finds himself captive in Mandarin City, along with various members of his rogues gallery, forced to work on Titanomechs for the Mandarin. Stark later finds out his 'base code' was compromised by the Mandarin due to the backup drive used to restore him in "Stark Disassembled" being compromised itself. In captivity with him is Ezekiel Stane, who has gone from being the Mandarin's ally to his pawn. Slowly reversing the modifications the Mandarin has made to Zeke to make him more obedient, Stark plots his escape from Mandarin City, away from modern technology. As he works, the War Machine, Pepper Potts and other allies of Stark look for him and launch the Stark Swarm, a computing platform on an atomic scale, powered by miniature RT nodes. While working, the Mandarin supervises him by hacking into his biology or flat out just torturing him and Zeke. Stark secretly patches the compromised code as the first step to his eventual escape from Mandarin City.

Stark and Stane puts their escape plan into action and convinces the Blizzard, the Living Laser, and Whirlwind to join forces with them to escape Mandarin City. Stark completes his armor and they begin escaping. Stark is located by his allies, due to his usage of the Stark Swarm and the Triumph Division and the Dynasty arrive to provide support towards the end of the battle. The Mandarin reveals the Titanomechs are designed to give a physical body to the spirits trapped in his ten Makluan rings and plans to sacrifice Earth in order to let the Titanomechs launch.

The battle turns in Stark's favor as he weaponizes the Stark Swarm and uses it as a cannon to destroy the various Titanomechs. Stane kills the Mandarin and Bethany Cabe returns them to the United States. Upon returning, Stark is interviewed by Maria Hill and reveals how he was compromised. Stane goes missing, and Stark realizes that he is depressed and needs to clear his head. However, he later learns that Stane has gone missing and calls Justine Hammer to warn her. Stark theorizes that Stane and Sasha Hammer will assassinate Justine Hammer for betraying them to the Mandarin. However, Justine chooses to ignore Stark and is later assassinated by Sasha and Zeke in her car. Stark continues his return to operating publicly as Iron Man, using the Model 3 armor, having borrowed it from Avengers Tower.

Stark repossesses both the Rescue and the War Machine armors from Pepper and Rhodes to melt down into parts. He later reveals he has built a new Space Armor.

The next morning, Stark tells the Resilient team that he is bored of the 'same old problems' and wishes to change the world and see new sights in order to obtain a paradigm shift. He apologizes to the Resilient team, and promises to do better next time, before he launches into space.

== Awards ==
The Invincible Iron Man won the 2009 Eisner Award for Best New Series.

== Collected editions ==
The series has been collected into a number of individual volumes:

- Volume 1: The Five Nightmares (collects #1–7, 184 pages, hardcover, December 2008, ISBN 0-7851-3461-1, softcover, March 2009, ISBN 0-7851-3412-3)
- Volume 2: World's Most Wanted Book 1 (collects #8–13, 152 pages, hardcover, August 2009, ISBN 0-7851-3828-5, softcover, November 2010, ISBN 0-7851-3413-1)
- Volume 3: World's Most Wanted Book 2 (collects #14–19, 160 pages, hardcover, January 2010, ISBN 0-7851-3935-4, softcover, May 2010, ISBN 0-7851-3685-1)
- Volume 4: Stark Disassembled (collects #20–24, 136 pages, hardcover, July 2010, ISBN 0-7851-4554-0, softcover, January 2011, ISBN 0-7851-3686-X)
- Volume 5: Stark Resilient Book 1 (collects #25–28, 128 pages, hardcover, September 2010, ISBN 0-7851-4555-9, softcover, February 2011, ISBN 0-7851-4556-7)
- Volume 6: Stark Resilient Book 2 (collects #29–33, 136 pages, hardcover, February 2011, ISBN 0-7851-4834-5, softcover, August 2011, ISBN 0-7851-4835-3)
- Volume 7: My Monsters (collects Annual #1, #500.1, #500, and material from #503, 168 pages, hardcover, June 2011, ISBN 0-7851-4836-1, softcover, November 2011, ISBN 0-7851-4837-X)
- Volume 8: The Unfixable (collects #501–502, Free Comic Book Day 2010: Iron Man/Thor, Rescue #1, and material from #503, 120 pages, hardcover, September 2011, ISBN 0-7851-5322-5, softcover, March 2012, ISBN 0-7851-5323-3)
- Fear Itself (collects #504–509 and Fear Itself #7.3, 144 pages, hardcover, March 2012, ISBN 0-7851-5773-5, softcover, October 2012, ISBN 978-0-7851-5774-8)
- Volume 9: Demon (collects #510–515, 144 pages, hardcover, July 2012, ISBN 0-7851-6046-9)
- Volume 10: Long Way Down (collects #516–520, 120 pages, hardcover, October 2012, ISBN 0-7851-6048-5)
- Volume 11: The Future (collects #521–527, 152 pages, hardcover, January 2013, ISBN 0-7851-6521-5)

It has also been collected into two Oversized Hardcover editions:

- The Invincible Iron Man by Fraction & Larroca Volume 1 (collects #1–19, 344 pages, March 2010, ISBN 0-7851-4295-9)
- The Invincible Iron Man by Fraction & Larroca Volume 2 (collects #20–33, 408 pages, January 2012, ISBN 0-7851-4553-2)
