= Fear Itself (comics) =

Superhero comics story

- Promotional image by Stuart Immonen
- Publisher: Marvel Comics
- Publication date: April – October 2011
- Main character(s): Thor; Captain America; Iron Man; The Worthy: Serpent: God of Fear; Skadi: Herald of the "Serpent"; Kuurth: Breaker of Stone; Nul: Breaker of Worlds; Skirn: Breaker of Men; Nerkkod: Breaker of Oceans; Mokk: Breaker of Faith; Greithoth: Breaker of Wills; Angrir: Breaker of Souls

Creative team
- Writer(s): Matt Fraction (miniseries); Ed Brubaker (prologue)
- Penciller(s): Stuart Immonen (miniseries); Scot Eaton (prologue); Steve McNiven (miniseries covers)
- Inker: Wade von Grawbadger
- Colorist: Laura Martin

"Fear Itself" is a 2011 crossover comic book storyline published by Marvel Comics, consisting of a seven-issue, eponymous miniseries written by Matt Fraction and illustrated by Stuart Immonen, Wade Von Grawbadger, and Laura Martin, a prologue book by writer Ed Brubaker and artist Scot Eaton, and one hundred and sixteen tie-in books, including most of the X-Men family of books.

"Fear Itself" was first announced by then-Marvel Editor-in-Chief Joe Quesada, Executive Editor Tom Brevoort and X-Men group editor Axel Alonso at a press conference held at Midtown Comics Times Square on December 21, 2010. The story, whose title is a reference to the famous quote by Franklin D. Roosevelt, "The only thing we have to fear is fear itself", depicts the various superheroes of the Marvel Universe contending with the Serpent, an Asgardian fear deity who causes global panic on Earth, and who seeks to reclaim the throne of Asgard he contends was usurped by his brother, Odin, father to Thor, when the latter vanquished him ages ago. Within the comics, the characters refer to this conflict as The Serpent's War. Although it is a company-wide crossover, it emphasizes Captain America and Thor, as with past crossovers of the late 2000s.

Critics exhibited mixed reaction to the different books of the storyline, praising the art in general, but generally panned the writing, especially in the core miniseries, and reported that the title failed to sell through at shops, though greater praise was given to some of the tie-in books, with one critic summarizing, "Fear Itself was a disaster. I don't see many people arguing that point—the most that can be said is that it had some amazing tie-ins", in particular Avengers Academy, Journey into Mystery and the later tie-in issues of Uncanny X-Men. Criticism was also directed to the number of books involved in the crossover, its duration, the lack of a clear beginning, middle and end to its structure, inconsequential character deaths, and the lack of any change to the status quo. The overall storyline holds an average score of 7.4 out of 10 at the review aggregator website Comic Book Roundup, with the core miniseries holding a 6.5, and the various tie-ins ranging from 4.3 to 7.9.

== Publication history ==
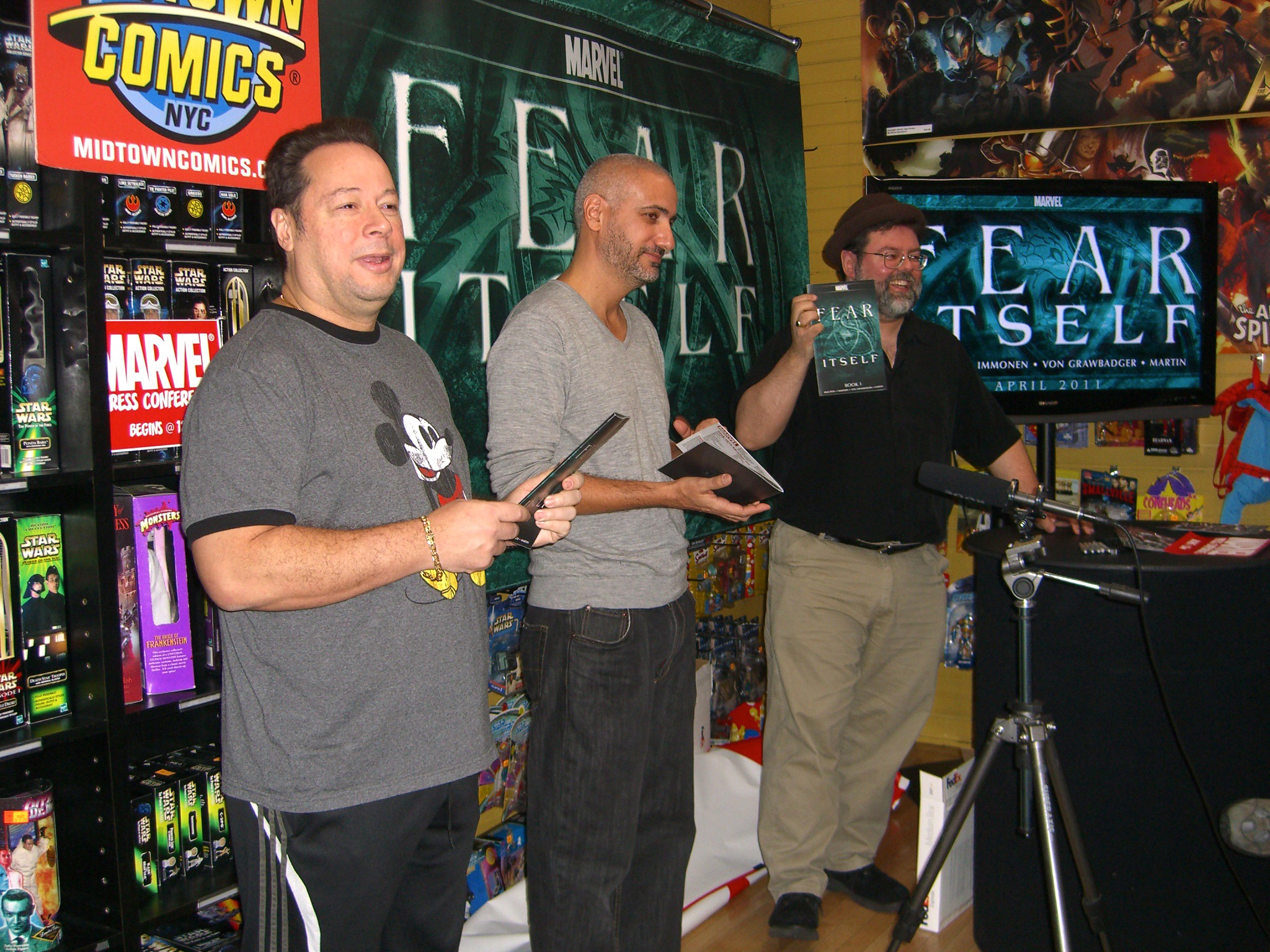
Joe Quesada, Axel Alonso and Tom Brevoort announcing the storyline at Midtown Comics Times Square, December 21, 2010

"Fear Itself" began as a proposed Captain America/Thor crossover by Matt Fraction. The storyline was first announced by then-Marvel editor-in-chief Joe Quesada and executive editors Tom Brevoort and Axel Alonso in a December 21, 2010 press conference at Midtown Comics Times Square. Quesada explained that like the 2006 storyline "Civil War", the storyline of "Fear Itself" was inspired by the real world, in particular the perceived malaise and fear evoked by late 2000s events such as terror alerts, oil spills, the Great Recession and partisan politics. Explains Quesada:

"The climate in the world today was certainly the inspiration for this as we started to think about the bigger stories for the Marvel Universe," Marvel editor in chief Joe Quesada said at a press conference at Midtown Comics in Manhattan. "You will absolutely see the real world inject itself into this story because it's undeniable that there's a certain something in the air right now...we tend to tap into that whether consciously or unconsciously and it effects [sic] all our stories."

The storyline's title is a reference to a famous quote by Franklin D. Roosevelt: "So, first of all, let me assert my firm belief that the only thing we have to fear is fear itself—nameless, unreasoning, unjustified terror which paralyzes needed efforts to convert retreat into advance", as indicated by the use of a portion that quote as part of the soundtrack of the trailer presented during the Midtown press conference. The story's antagonist is the Serpent, an Asgardian being who sows doubt and fear among the superheroes of the Marvel Comics Universe, as illustrated by early promotional images for the event, which depict Spider-Man, Hulk, Captain America, Cyclops, Thor, and Iron Man coming face to face with their worst nightmares. During this conflict, which is referred to among the characters as the Serpent's War, the Serpent is revealed to be Cul, Odin's brother, who assumed the throne of Asgard following the death of their father. Born at the dawn of time, Cul was subsequently banished and imprisoned by Odin following Cul's corrupt rule, and a prophecy by Yggdrasil that cost Odin his right eye, and which revealed that Cul's madness could only be cured by the death of Odin's son.

Brevoort explained that all major characters are featured in the storyline, which involve a number of unconventional alliances, with even Marvel's version of Dracula participating in the event. Another god of fear, the adolescent Phobos, who is a member of the Secret Warriors, also appears in the series. Brevoort further explained that subtle hints of the storyline were planted well in advance, between approximately 15 months and two years prior to the miniseries, some of which may only be perceptible in hindsight. Brevoort and Alonso explained that although the story also ties into all of the company's other high-profile titles, and presents stakes as high as an "extinction-level event", the story could be understood by those who choose to read only the core Fear Itself miniseries. The related titles include the X-Men family of books, with the exception of X-Factor.

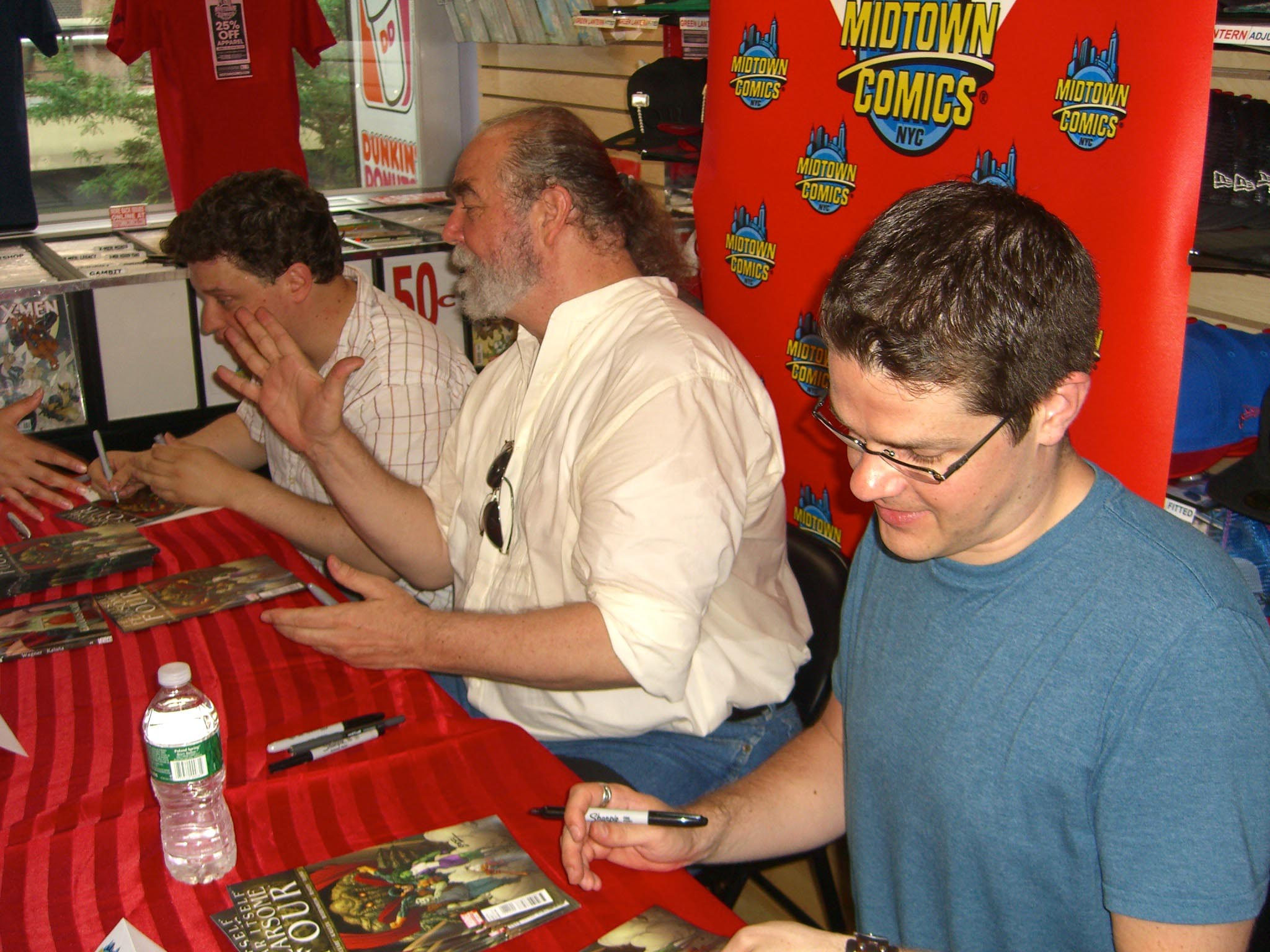
Brandon Montclare, Michael Kaluta and Ryan Bodenheim at a June 8, 2011 Midtown Comics signing for Fear Itself: Fearsome Four #1

The Fear Itself prologue book, which was published in March 2011, features Captain America and Namor, and is produced by writer Ed Brubaker and artist Scot Eaton. The main Fear Itself miniseries, which debuted the following month, is written by Matt Fraction, and features illustrated interiors by Stuart Immonen and Wade von Grawbadger and covers by Steve McNiven. Fear Itself #1 is priced at $3.99 USD, and was projected to be about 45 pages long, according to Brevoort. (The first issue, when published, was 56 pages long.) Brevoort also indicated that the final issue would also be oversized, as is typical with such event miniseries. (The final issue was 64 pages long, 16 of which were devoted to epilogues that set up subsequent spinoff books.)

To promote Fear Itself: Fearsome Four #1, one of the tie-in books, writer Brandon Montclare and artists Michael Kaluta and Ryan Bodenheim appeared at Midtown Comics Downtown on June 8, 2011, where they signed copies of the book. Writers Greg Pak, Fred Van Lente and editor Mark Paniccia later held a signing at the same store on June 18 for Alpha Flight #1, which is also part of the storyline.

A 12-issue, biweekly spinoff miniseries of "Fear Itself" titled The Fearless, debuted October 19, 2011. The series, which depicts Captain America, the Avengers and others dealing with the aftermath of the events of "Fear Itself", is written by Fraction, Cullen Bunn and Chris Yost, and is illustrated by Mark Bagley and Paul Pelletier. Other aftereffects of the crossover are explored in a series of one-shots under the title Shattered Heroes, in a manner similar to how the 2010 "Heroic Age" storyline served as a follow-up to the 2008-2009 "Dark Reign" storyline. Shattered Heroes is part of "Battle Scars", a rebranding of the Marvel Universe books most affected by "Fear Itself".

== Plot summary ==
=== Prologue ===
In Fear Itself: Book of the Skull, the Red Skull performs a ritual during World War II, on orders of Adolf Hitler, which causes the Hammer of Skadi to fall to Earth where it lands in Antarctica. Traveling to Antarctica, the Red Skull finds the hammer but is unable to lift it. Red Skull has Adolf Hitler's Thule Society seal it away and put it under their guard. Many years later, Red Skull's daughter Sin, with the help of Baron Zemo, retrieves the Book of the Skull that contains the location of the hammer.

=== Core miniseries ===
The Serpent, Skadi and the seven characters turned into the Worthy. From Fear Itself #4 (September 2011). Art by Stuart Immonen.

While Tony Stark holds a press conference announcing that his company, Stark Resilient, will help rebuild Asgard in Broxton, Oklahoma following the "Siege" storyline, Sin finds the Hammer of Skadi, and after lifting it becomes Skadi, Herald of the Serpent. She then frees the Serpent from his underwater prison, after which seven celestial objects fall from the sky around the globe. Learning of the Serpent's escape, Odin withdraws his people from Earth against the protests of his son Thor. The seven celestial objects are revealed to be divine hammers that contain the essences of the Serpent's seven generals known as the Worthy. Coming into contact with four of the hammers, Juggernaut, Hulk, Titania, and Attuma are respectively transformed into the first of these beings: Kuurth: Breaker of Stone; Nul: Breaker of Worlds; Skirn: Breaker of Men; and Nerkkod: Breaker of Oceans. Along with Skadi, the Worthy go on a rampage all over the Earth for the Serpent. Among their targets are Washington, D.C. and the New York City superhuman prison known as the Raft, from which a number of imprisoned superhumans escape. In the tie-in books, Grey Gargoyle, the Thing, and the Absorbing Man find the other hammers, and are transformed into the remaining three Worthy: Mokk: Breaker of Faith; Angrir: Breaker of Souls; and Greithoth: Breaker of Wills, respectively.

During their battle in Washington, D.C., Skadi mortally wounds the current Captain America, Bucky Barnes. In Asgard, Odin prepares his people to raze Earth completely in order to destroy the Serpent. Thor opposes this and returns to Earth. After Steve Rogers again assumes the mantle of Captain America, Thor confronts the Serpent, who reveals himself to be Odin's brother and claims to be the rightful bearer of Asgard's throne, before dispatching Thor. Thor then fights Angrir and Nul (the transformed Thing and Hulk) simultaneously, killing Angrir (who is revived by Franklin Richards) and knocking Nul halfway around the world, after which Thor collapses from exhaustion. Iron Man requests from Odin the use of his workshop to make weapons to fight the Worthy. Skadi and the Serpent easily repel resistance by Captain America and the Avengers, breaking Captain America's shield and devastating New York City.

The Serpent breaks Captain America's shield in Fear Itself #5 (October 2011). Art by Stuart Immonen and Wade Von Grawbadger. Colors by Laura Martin.

As Thor convalesces in Asgard, Odin gives him his own battle armor and the Odinsword, Ragnarok, for a last suicide mission against the Serpent. Iron Man and the dwarves of Svartalfheim present eight newly forged weapons, each designed for a specific Avenger and containing both his repulsor technology and uru (the same metal composing Thor's hammer Mjölnir). They throw them into a vat of boiling uru – into which Iron Man himself leaps – to receive Odin's enchantments. In Broxton, Captain America raises a militia of armed citizens who wish to remain to fight, and along with the Avengers, prepares for a final confrontation with the Serpent and the Worthy.

Iron Man returns to Earth, his armor coated with Asgardian uru enchanted by Odin, along with similarly enhanced weapons with which he arms Spider-Man, Black Widow, Iron Fist, Wolverine, Ms. Marvel, Hawkeye, Red She-Hulk, and Doctor Strange. They confront the Serpent's forces and are joined by the people of Broxton and Captain America, who wields Thor's hammer against Skadi. The Worthy are vanquished from their hosts when Odin summons their hammers away from them, and Thor kills the Serpent at the cost of his life. As Thor and Bucky are mourned by their allies, Odin returns to Asgard with the corpse of his brother Cul, sealing off Asgard from Hermod and a number of other Asgardians, who are left on Earth. The Stark-Asgardian weapons are returned to Asgard to be melted (with the exception of Red She-Hulk, who retains hers), and Iron Man presents Rogers with his reforged shield, now enhanced with uru metal.

==== Epilogue issues ====
Fear Itself: #7.1: Captain America depicts Captain America dealing with the loss of Bucky, and reveals that Bucky survived Skadi's attack as a result of being injected with the Infinity Formula. With the world believing him dead, Bucky returns to his former identity of Winter Soldier, performing special operations, developments to which only Steve Rogers, Nick Fury, and Black Widow are privy.

Fear Itself #7.2: Thor sees the introduction of Thor's tentative replacement, Tanarus.

Fear Itself #7.3: Iron Man deals with Tony Stark's despair over the still-petrified population of Paris, his anger at Odin for not preventing it, and Odin's reaction to Stark's challenge, which Stark relates to the imprisoned Grey Gargoyle, who was responsible for the Parisians' fate as a member of the Worthy.

=== Tie-in books ===
Fear Itself: Sin's Past #1 is a reprint book that collects Captain America #355-357 from 1989, which introduced Sin as part of her father's Daughters of Sin.

Fear Itself: The Worthy is an anthology origin book in which Sin and each of the Worthy detail the major events of their life in first-person narration, with each vignette concluding with an open-ended look to the future.

The Mighty Thor #7 establishes the Serpent's origin story, revealing him to have been the sibling to Odin, Vili and Vi, who assumed the throne of Asgard following the death of their father, Bor, at the dawn of time, and whose rule was marked by madness and corruption. Odin sacrificed his right eye to receive wisdom from Yggdrasil, which prophesied that to heal his brother, Odin would have to sacrifice his son.

Iron Man uses the dwarven workshops of Asgard to create weapons to fight the Worthy, as seen in both the core miniseries and the monthly Iron Man title. From the cover to The Invincible Iron Man #506 (September 2011). Art by Salvador Larroca.

The Invincible Iron Man follows Iron Man as he travels to Paris to confront Grey Gargoyle who, as Mokk: Breaker of Faith, has turned the populace to stone. After Iron Man's rival Detroit Steel meets with the same fate, and Iron Man's armor and energy supply are compromised, Tony Stark uses Odin's Workshops of Svartalfheim to make weapons to fight the Worthy, as pro-Serpent forces conspire against him. In Paris, Rescue comes into conflict with Sasha Hammer and her team of Steelmechs, but both are confronted by Mokk as well. Mokk leaves Paris, however, when the Serpent summons his Worthy to join him at the portal to Asgard in Broxton, while Iron Man returns to Earth with the Asgardian weapons.

In Iron Man 2.0, War Machine, Prince of Orphans, Iron Fist, and the Immortal Weapons fight Skirn, and witness Absorbing Man as he is transformed into Greithoth: Breaker of Wills.

In Avengers, Spider-Woman, Ms. Marvel, and Protector arrive in Brazil to help Red She-Hulk fight Nul.

In New Avengers, Skadi sends the Thule Society to the United States where they fight the New Avengers, at one point attacking Avengers Mansion.

In Secret Avengers, that team confronts Skadi during her attack upon Washington, D.C. Meanwhile, Black Widow confronts the webmasters of a tabloid site for fabricating a story that Bucky Barnes is still alive and his death a hoax.

In Avengers Academy, the staff and students of the eponymous school fight convicts attempting to escape the Raft, and are later sent to Washington, D.C. to fight Skadi's forces. In Dubai, the faculty later battle Greithoth and Skirn, who subsequently attack the students at Infinite Avengers Mansion.

In Fear Itself: Youth in Revolt, Captain Steve Rogers has Ritchie Gilmore/Prodigy assemble a new incarnation of the Avengers Initiative, in which includes members of The Cavalry, the Heavy Hitters, the Desert Stars, Action Pack, and the Shadow Initiative, but the team's efforts in Atlanta, Georgia result in Thor Girl being arrested and later becoming a fugitive from justice. The team also confronts Crossbones in New Jersey, and tries unsuccessfully to stop Kuurth in Las Vegas.

In Hulk, Red Hulk attempts to stop Angrir's attack upon Avengers Tower, but the Tower is destroyed in the process and the Avengers' manservant Edwin Jarvis barely escapes. As their battle continues, Zero/One and MODOK compete to reach Red Hulk, as they each harbor plans for him.

In Fear Itself: Hulk vs. Dracula, Hulk/Nul, following his battle with Thor in Fear Itself #5, crashes in the Carpathian Mountains and is confronted by Dracula and his vampire army. The series also explores political relationships between Dracula and other breeds and sects of vampires, and introduces a vampire superhero team called the Forgiven, whom Dracula frees from their dungeons in order to combat Hulk/Nul.

In Thunderbolts, the eponymous team deals with the escape of convicts from the destroyed Raft, one of whom is Juggernaut, who becomes one of the Worthy and battles the Thunderbolts outside Chicago. Issue #159 is an anthology issue, with different vignettes focusing on the Raft breakout starring Warden John Walker and convict Crossbones. The Thunderbolts later battle aquatic mutants rising out of Lake Michigan.

In Fear Itself: Spider-Man, the webslinger attempts to deal with the rampant paranoia that grips Manhattan, which includes, in addition to his own hallucinations, attempted suicides, hate crimes, no cell phone service and satellite activity, an attack by Vermin, a foreclosed homeowner holding people hostage in St. Mark's Church, a woman in labor in need of a hospital and an attack by the Thing, who has been turned into Angrir.

In Fear Itself: FF, the Thing's teammates Mister Fantastic and Invisible Woman also confront the Thing/Angrir and try to free him from the Serpent's influence.

In Fear Itself: Black Widow, Black Widow and Peregrine are sent on a mission to free hostages being held in a Marseille cathedral by Rapido. He and a group of mercenaries are trying to exploit the panic over the events in Paris to steal France's nuclear arsenal.

Protagonists battle Hulk/Nul (left) in Avengers and Hulk vs. Dracula, while Grey Gargoyle/Mokk (right) faces off against the cast of Iron Man in that series, and Juggernaut/Kuurth (center) appears in at least five different tie-in books. From the cover to Fear Itself #2 (July 2011). Art by Steve McNiven.

The anthology miniseries Fear Itself: The Home Front explores how the events of the storyline affect the ordinary citizens of the Marvel Universe, much as Civil War: Front Line and Siege: Embedded had previously done with the "Civil War" and "Siege" crossover storylines, respectively. The series follows Robbie Baldwin as he escapes an angry Stamford mob, and his confrontations with Kuurth, Nerkodd and a hate group founded by Sin called Sisters of Sin. The series also follows the investigation of an abandoned Thule Society headquarters by Jimmy Woo and the Agents of Atlas, Liz Allan's encounter with bank robbers as she tries to escape New York City with her son, Cardiac's attempt to help a health care industry CEO whose son has meningitis, Blue Marvel's discovery of a submarine harboring antimatter samples off the coast of Kadesh, Mister Fear's realization that the Serpent and his Worthy have surpassed his ability to induce fear in people, American Eagle's attempt to deal with the fear and chaos in Bleachville, the Great Lakes Avengers' confrontation with the forgotten villain Asbestos Man and the attack upon Amadeus Cho, X-23, Spider-Girl, Power Man and Thunderstrike by a group of samurai Shark Men after the former group is teleported onto a station in the Pacific Ocean.

In Uncanny X-Men, the mutant team is in San Francisco in an attempt to ease anti-mutant tensions, when they learn that Kuurth is rampaging through California, and decide to confront him when he reaches the city.

In New Mutants, Danielle Moonstar encounters Hela in Las Vegas, and is transported to Hel. When her teammates try to follow her using forbidden magic, they instead end up in Hell, where they encounter Mephisto, who offers transport the team to Hel, for a price.

In Fear Itself: Uncanny X-Force, that team investigates a terrorist bombing, which leads them to a Christian fundamentalist cult named the Purifiers, whose leader, a former neurosurgeon named Jonathan Standish, sees the appearance of the Worthy as a sign that the Devil is on Earth, and blames superhumans for the global chaos.

In Fear Itself: Wolverine, Wolverine infiltrates the Prometheus, a fully armed Helicarrier originally intended as Norman Osborn's H.A.M.M.E.R. flagship, which was stolen from a secret U.S. facility in the Sonoran Desert by a rogue faction of S.T.R.I.K.E., who intend to use it to deploy a nuclear warhead in the city, after their leader took the appearance of the Worthy as a sign instructing him to do so.

Fear Itself: The Deep reveals that Nerkodd conquered New Atlantis, ousted its king, Namor, and installed Tyrak, his sister Aradnea, and Tiger Shark as its occupying generals. Namor and his comrades, Lyra, Loa, Doctor Strange and the Silver Surfer, are attacked by the Undying Ones, demons who break through Earth's dimension as a result of the global panic weakening the barriers between the dimensions and who make a deal with Nerkodd to help them take over Earth.

In Herc, Hercules pursues escapees from the Raft, and must also confront a resurrected Kyknos and the amnesiac Hecate, who tries to take over Brooklyn after her memories are restored.

In Ghost Rider, a woman named Alejandra who grew up in a pyramid temple in Nicaragua among the followers of a man named Adam, becomes a new, female Ghost Rider, and confronts Skadi and her allies. Meanwhile, Mephisto tells Johnny Blaze, who is at peace now that he is free of the curse of Ghost Rider, that Adam (who relieved Blaze of the curse and bestowed it upon Alejandra) intends to take away all of humanity's sins, which will turn it into a cold, emotionless stagnant race devoid of creativity. Mephisto tells Blaze that he must separate Alejandra from Adam, but Alejandra is unwilling to agree to this.

The debut of Alpha Flight's fourth volume depicts the Canadian superhero team's rescue efforts for victims of a tsunami created by Nerkodd, and their ejection of Nerkodd from Canada.

In Fear Itself: Fearsome Four, She-Hulk, Howard the Duck, Frankenstein's Monster, and Nighthawk intervene when the empathic Man-Thing goes on a rampage in Mahhattan, due to the fear and chaos he senses on the part of the citizenry, and discover a plot by Psycho-Man to use Man-Thing's volatile empathy to create a weapon.

In Fear Itself: Deadpool, which offers a humorous take on the storyline, Deadpool hopes to improve his security consultation business by arranging for Walrus to find an ordinary hammer to convince him that he is one of the Worthy, in the hopes of subsequently defeating him publicly to bolster his reputation. His plan backfires when the hammer, which belongs to a group of werewolves called the Moon-Born, exhibits special properties under the full moon, which Walrus utilizes while battling Deadpool. Deadpool manages to trick Walrus into entering the windowless basement of a sheriff's office where the hammer becomes powerless, and where Deadpool can take advantage of the sheriff's weapon's cache.

=== Aftermath ===
Fear Itself: The Fearless pits Sin and Valkyrie against one another as they compete to find the hammers of the Worthy that fell to Earth at the end of the main miniseries.

== Critical reception ==
Critics exhibited mixed reaction to the work of the individual creators involved in the different books of the "Fear Itself" crossover, praising the art in general, but generally panned the writing as "pedestrian, bordering on silly", and reported that the title failed to sell through at shops. Roman Colombo of Weekly Comic Book Review commented, "Fear Itself was a disaster. I don't see many people arguing that point–the most that can be said is that it had some amazing tie-ins", in particular Avengers Academy, Journey into Mystery and the later tie-in issues of Uncanny X-Men. Mike Gold of ComicMix called the crossover "lightweight", criticizing the number of books involved in the crossover, its duration, and the lack of a clear beginning, middle and end to its structure. Gold found it endemic of "endless phony dull event stunts" that he had been criticizing for over a decade. Comic Shop News, in their 2011 Red K Awards, gave the "Done and Undone" Award to the crossover, criticizing its "blink or you'll miss it" practice of killing characters in the miniseries and then resurrecting them in the "Point-One" aftermath books, and the sense that no change to the status quo had taken place by the end of the entire series. The overall storyline holds an average score of 7.4 out of 10 at the review aggregator website Comic Book Roundup.

=== Prologue reviews ===
Erik Norris of IGN gave the prologue a "Great" rating of 8 out of 10, saying it set up the crossover storyline effectively. He also praised Brubaker's vibrant depiction of the characters and Scot Eaton's artwork for effectively capturing character emotions.

Chad Nevett, reviewing the Fear Itself: Book of the Skull for Comic Book Resources, opined that it felt like a drawn-out issue of Ed Brubaker's Captain America, and a lead-in to the 2011 relaunch of that title, rather than an essential setup for "Fear Itself". Calling Brubaker's story and Scot Eaton's art "competent", Nevett characterized it as "a good comic, not great", "an entertaining superhero action comic" and "your pretty standard 'Red Skull crazy World War 2 scheme' plot with few surprises." Though he felt that Eaton's art was clear and the action shots energetic, he felt Eaton's line work was cluttered at times, his faces "bulging and scrunched at the same time" and in general, his work "generic".

At Newsarama, David Pepose noted Brubaker's talent for mixing fun dialogue with action, but thought the book read "a little choppy". He described Scot Eaton's pencils as having "an exciting vibrancy", singling out his rendition of character close-ups, but felt that in light of Marvel and Matt Fraction's promotion of the miniseries, that the prologue was unnecessary.

Danny Djeljosevic of Comics Bulletin saw Book of the Skull as Brubaker's embracing of the silliness of the Marvel Universe, and also questioned if readers would need the prologue to appreciate the crossover, saying that Captain America's presence in the story felt more like a marketing ploy than a natural aspect of it. Djeljosevic found the supervillain interaction to be fun, and wished that it had been given the focus of the book.

Alex Evans of Weekly Comic Book Review gave the book a "B", thought, despite his aversion to prologue books, for Brubaker's scripting, the accurate tone of each of the characters, comparing the combination of Nazis and paranormal elements to the work of Mike Mignola, as well as Eaton's "fantastic" art. Evans opined, however, that it did not function well as a prologue, because it did not inform him as to the nature of the upcoming storyline.

Evan Narcisse, Graeme McMillan and Douglas Wolk of Time magazine's Techland website found the book to be "tepid", and stated that it failed to provide exposition for new readers, or to inform or intrigue readers as to the upcoming storyline, which they felt was emblematic about Marvel's "insular" approach to big event storylines.

=== Core miniseries reviews ===
Characters standing before Yggdrasil at the end of Fear Itself #1 (July 2011), one of the images for which the creative team of Stuart Immonen, Wade Von Grawbadger and Laura Martin were universally praised. By contrast, the core miniseries' writing drew more varied reactions, with multiple reviewers citing a high standard set by the early issues that was not met by the latter ones.

Doug Zawisza, reviewing the Fear Itself miniseries for Comic Book Resources, commended writer Matt Fraction for the first two issues, praising his establishment of the story and tying it into Marvel Universe history in the first issue, while still making it enjoyable for new readers. Zawisza was less impressed with issues 2 - 4. Though they enticed him to buy the tie-in books, which he normally does not do with crossovers, he felt the story's shift of locales, the lack of resolution to its setups, the depiction of action in "snippets" and the relegation of important plot events to tie-in books hurt the story. By issues 5 and 6, which Zawisza felt exhibited out-of-character dialogue, he felt the miniseries had failed to live up to the promise of the first issue, despite some powerful character-defining moments. Zawisza was more favorable towards Stuart Immonen's art, calling it "incredible" and "gorgeous", and Immonen a "modern master" whose ability to convey a large amount of story in a small portion of a page Zawisza compared to that of George Pérez. Though Zawisza was not reluctant to note the occasional error, He consistently singled out Immonen for his simple but detailed storytelling, and his ability to render varied subject matter, from Nazis to sea monsters, praising specific visuals such as his Immonen and Laura Martin's depiction of Yggdrasil in issue #1, as well as numerous scenes in issue #4, such as the scenes of global chaos, the Odin-Serpent framing sequence and the shots of British Columbia, which he called "chilling". Zawisza also praised Wade Von Grawbadger's inks and Martin's colors. Despite his disappointment with the latter in issue #4, he singled issue #5's rendition of a sequence spoken in runes and the electric blue lightning emanating from Thor's hammer as otherwise strong inking and coloring, respectively. Zawisza also positively compared Chris Eliopoulos' lettering to that of John Workman.

At Newsarama, Jennifer Margret Smith praised Fraction's slow building of an uneasy fearful tone, his ability to play to smaller, less tangible emotions and for capturing the real-world parallels of the country's mood and Steve Rogers' Barack Obama-like characteristics in issue #1. George Marston felt the second issue built an air of paranoia and panic with an effective and utilitarian staccato pace, and enjoyed the surprising choices for the Worthy, saying that the series' main strength is relying on multiple ideas and story beats to create "a collective reading experience that may change the landscape of the Marvel Universe, [which doesn't do so] at the expense of its own readability." Colin Bell felt the third issue was merely "passable", as it failed to depict the Worthy's actions in a consequential manner, and lacked gravitas until the end. Marston felt issue #4 exhibited more momentum and sweeping heroics, and contrasted Fraction's writing with Brian Michael Bendis' tendency to build events slowly. Marston conceded that the story's major beats could be perceived for their shock value, but contrasted this with the "little moments" that he felt stood out. Newsarama's reviewers consistently gave high ratings to the entire art team, with Smith commenting, "It's Immonen who really shines", and Marston describing the entire art team as "the perfect blend of depth and deceptive simplicity", Immonen and Von Grawbager's "frenetic energy", and Laura Martin as Marvel's "go-to colorist, injecting every page with mood, atmosphere, and clarity." Looking over the entire miniseries in his review of issue #7, Marston noted that it contained both breathtaking moments and "dragging nonsense", the latter particularly evident in the final two issues. Marston felt issue #7 in particular contained a rushed climax and an overall lack of exposition, resonance and depth for what should have been important elements of the story, which he felt was emblematic of the miniseries. Marston criticized the epilogue pages for being devoted to upcoming spinoff books instead of these elements.

At Comics Bulletin, a roundtable review of issue #1 by five reviews resulted in an average rating of 3.7 out of 5 bullets. The reviewers generally praised the writing and art, though Ray Tate, who expressed an aversion to large-scale "event" storylines, questioned the first issue's execution, and perceived out-of-character behavior on the part of Odin. Norse mythology fan Thom Young stated that certain elements did not resonate or ring true to him. Danny Djeljosevic gave issue #2 a rating of 3.5 bullets, again praising the tension-building of the story and the art. For issue #3, Shawn Hill rated it 3.5, stating that art and characterization justified continued patronage of the series, but that the plot did not, while Sam Salama Cohén exhibited an overall more positive reaction, with 4.5 bullets. Djeljosevic gave 4 bullets to issue #4, complimenting Fraction for hitting his stride as he scripted "the most technically daunting task in his comics career", and singling out the parallel scenes of Odin and the Serpent rallying their troops in particular. Like Doug Zawisza, Djeljosevic was impressed by Stuart Immonen's ability to effectively render different subjects, from sleepy seaside Canadian towns to superhero battles, and remarking, "Immonen is easily the most versatile artist in comics, who will surely go down as one of the greats with his striking layouts and dynamic, varied panel to panel storytelling. Immonen reminds me of the old-school Marvel Comics artists, who were capable of delivering strong, consistent work every month with little need for fill-ins."

Jason Serafino of Complex magazine, in reviewing issue #6, stated, "The Fear Itself series has stalled somewhat after a strong debut issue," but equivocated, "It's tough to ask for too much from a series that hinges on little more than some widescreen action and incredible art. Just sit back, relax, and enjoy the mayhem."

Jesse Schedeen of IGN rated the first two issues a "Great" 8.5 out of 10 and a "Good" 7.5, respectively, saying that the story and characterization were well-executed by Fraction, including the nuanced, weighty Norse dialogue. Schedeen also thought Immonen's wide, cinematic panels were "top-notch", and Laura Martin's colors "characteristically lush and beyond reproach", but thought Wade von Grawbadger's inks were thicker and slightly less precise than on his previous New Avengers work. However, Schedeen rated three of the following four issues a "Good" or "Okay" 6.5, and the final issue an "Okay" 6.0, citing lack of context of the story's global events, poor characterization and dialogue, reliance on events relegated to tie-in books, use of too many of the final pages for epilogues and an overall sense that the series failed to surpass its origins as a Thor/Captain America crossover.

Alex Evans of Weekly Comic Book Review gave a "B+" to three of the first four issues, saying that Fraction effected a sincere, topically relevant and emotionally authentic story rather than a marketing ploy or editorial shuffle. Evans felt the book utilized its scene-jumping structure to properly explore the expansive, global impact of the Worthy as a legitimate threat, and that both Bucky's death and Loki's humorous dialogue were well-handled. However, Evans decried the too-straightforward treatment of Sin's setup, and the lack of Fraction's usual subtext in issue #3 (which he graded "B-"). Evans and Dean Stell graded the next three issues C+, "C-" and "D", expressing that, despite the exciting battles, the issues were marred by a transitional feel, redundant material covered in tie-ins, a "hideous" deus ex machina use of Franklin Richards' massive but ill-defined powers, a ludicrous opening scene in issue #6, choppy storytelling, meaningless character deaths, and lack of closure. Stell called it a "crappy" series based on a "thin" concept that warranted neither seven issues nor the copious tie-in books. The reviewers thought the art and colors were vibrant and detailed, and Immonen the perfect choice for the series, though Stell thought it looked a bit rushed in issue #6, and not up to Immonen's usual standards in issue #7.

=== Tie-in book reviews ===
Jesse Schedeen of IGN gave Fear Itself: Sin's Past #1 a "Mediocre" rating of 5 out 10, saying that the issues chosen for reprinting were not the ideal ones from which readers could learn about the character, as the character's first appearances did not feature her disfigured, skull-like appearance, did little to flesh out her character and the modern and because the bold, modern coloring did not mesh with Al Milgrom's soft pencils, whose detailing of Rich Buckler's layouts issue #355 were inconsistent in quality to begin with.

Schedeen gave Fear Itself: The Worthy #1 an "Okay" rating of 6 out of 10, opining that while the origin stories, they were not particularly memorable, owing to their limited page space, that Sin's segment was a rehash of the Book of the Skull prologue, and that while the Hulk and Thing segments were outstanding in terms of the writing by Greg Pak and Roberto Aguirre-Sacasa and the artwork by Lee Weeks and Javier Pulido, the entire book was available for free on Comixology.

Page from Journey into Mystery #625 (October 2011), a tie-in book for which both the writing by Kieron Gillen's and the artwork by Doug Braithwaite, Ulises Arreola, and Rich Elson were widely applauded.

Alex Evans, reviewing issues 622–626 of Journey into Mystery for Weekly Comic Book Review, gave a grade of "A+" to the first issue, and an "A-" to the next three. He called the first four issues "brilliant", repeatedly lauding their consistent excellence from month to month, and naming the series one of Marvel's best comics, saying the first issue was the best one of the year thus far. Evans described Gillen's child Loki story as "perfection", and hailed Gillen's ability to tie in seemingly digressive elements as thematically relevant, his issue structure and his facility for narration and dialogue, as well as the humor, adventure and characterization. Evans called Braithwaite's art and Ulises Arreola's colors "stunning" and "epic", finding it to be on a higher level than other comics art, and comparable to that found in a fantasy storybook, which he felt made the Asgardian environment seem "immense, important, and full of life." Evans and D.S. Arsenault gave a "B+" to issues 626 and 630, respectively, with Evans that despite being "absolutely fantastic", his grade was due simply to the exceptionally high standard set by the prior issues, and that Surtur and the troika of Try, Leah and the Disir not as interesting. Arsenault cited Loki's "heroically comic" scene-stealing, and aside from not enjoying the visuals in the flashback sequence as much (whose purpose he conceded he understood), he thought the book a "hoot" that new readers would enjoy. Chad Nevett and Ryan K. Lindsay of Comic Book Resources gave 4 out of 5 stars to issues 622, 624 and 625, and 3.5 stars to issues 623 and 626, seeing it as superior to the core miniseries. The reviewers praised the intelligence, structure and "cerebral" narrative of Gillen's of Thor and Loki's new relationship set against Asgardian politics, calling it a "glorious tale", and an improvement over his previous Thor work. Also mentioned were Gillen's whimsical captions, "tight dialogue" and his ability to plant narrative seeds and follow through purposefully with winding plot twists. They also noted Braithwaite's "intricate", "amazing art" and Arreola's colors, and how this lent itself to depicting Loki's various moods. Rich Johnston of Bleeding Cool positively compared issue #623 to the 2011 Thor feature film, calling it the "perfect comic" for presenting Asgard in a "grandly poetic" light, "epic" and "beautiful". Johnston praised the book for the complexity in which it elevated Loki as a more impressive character than Thor. Reviewers at Comics Bulletin gave 4 out of 5 bullets to Journey Into Mystery #622, 624 and 625, giving Kieron Gillen high marks for his storytelling, characterization, humor and satisfyingly brisk pace, and Doug Braithwaite for his "wondrously detailed" art. Jesse Schedeen of IGN, who gave issue #623 a "Great" rating of 8.5 out of 10, also enjoyed Gillen's "refined and almost lyrical" dialogue, and the art, though he felt the colors needed some adjustment. Schedeen gave issue #627 a "Great" rating of 8.0 out of 10, saying that what was essentially a filler issue was elevated by the creative team's execution, and that Rich Elson's made an appropriate substitution for artist Doug Braithwaite, but that the lettering was too small and indistinct. Schedeen gave issue #630 an "Amazing" rating of 9 out of 10, calling Gillen's Volstagg tale a "classic" and the series "Marvel's best ongoing book". He compared it to the "Wiz Kids" segment of the 2001 Simpsons episode "Treehouse of Horror XII", and applauded its humor, emotion, the rendition of the different sides of Volstagg's personality, and the manner in which guest artist Rich Elson's refined, precise pencils addressed the previous problems Schedeen perceived in the series. The "Fear Itself" issues of Journey Into Mystery have the highest score of any tie-in at Comic Book Roundup, with 8.6 out of 10.

Roman Colombo of Weekly Comic Book Review gave a "B+" to The Mighty Thor #7, saying that the prequel story of Odin and the Serpent's childhood did such a good job of providing a setup for the main storyline, and its impact so palpable that it should have been part of the prologue. In addition to the book's appropriately non-colloquial dialogue among the gods, Colombo felt that because of the much-needed characterization to the Serpent, which Colombo felt the main miniseries lacked, he would be more invested in re-reading that miniseries. He felt Pasqual Ferry's art was hit-or-miss, however. Erik Norris of IGN gave the book a "Mediocre" score of 5.5 out of 10, saying that issue was a "ho-hum filler" that did not provide context to Thor's death, nor accomplish anything not covered by the core miniseries, saying the book's revelations might have been topical and poignant had it been published before the miniseries was. Norris felt the transition from a young Odin to aged one was handled poorly, criticized the rendition of the Worthy as the contemporary characters that are possessed by them in the miniseries.

Alex Evans, reviewing New Avengers #14 and 15 for Weekly Comic Review, graded them "A-" and "B", calling the first issue the best since the series' first story arc, due to writer Brian Michael Bendis' intimate character work with Mockingbird, and artist Mike Deodato's ability to capture the most subtle nuances of emotion in facial expressions. Regarding the next issue, Evans thought that while it was not as compelling as the previous one, Bendis nonetheless fleshed out Squirrel Girl into a "fully realized, sympathetic character", disproving his initial expectations upon learning that it focused on Squirrel Girl.

CBR's Greg McElhatton enjoyed Nick Spencer's script for Secret Avengers #13, in particular the lateral thinking McElhatton felt Spencer employed in seizing the opportunity to do a different take on "Fear Itself". Though he was impressed with the story's ability to stand on its own without requiring reading a different title, he did not care for its reliance on coincidence. McElhatton also enjoyed Scot Eaton's pencils, in particular his rendition of Beast and of the fight scenes, but noted that Adi Granov's cover to the book included a number of characters not in it. Alex Evans of Weekly Comic Book Review gave the issue a "B+", commending Spencer for keeping the story topical with a sense of anxiety that transcended the story's villains, and for his work with both the Beast and Lenny's friendship and with Ant-Man. Evans also called Scot Eaton's art "incredibly polished, detailed, and high budget", as seen in both the attack on Washington, DC and the character's reactions to it. Evans said the book fulfilled all the criteria for a good tie-in book, including a message that avoided being overly sentimental or silly.

Ray Tate gave 5 out of 5 bullets to Avengers Academy #15, but only three bullets to issue #16. Conceding he was disinterested in the crossover's core miniseries, he nonetheless liked Christos Gage's exploration of Tigra in Academy #15, but thought issue #16 to be a "mixed bag", saying that while the creative team succeeded in making the Veil story resonant, the drama of the Absorbing Man and Titania did not engage him, despite being technically good. Dean Stell of Weekly Comic Book Review gave a "B-" to issue #18, calling it a good opportunity for readers looking to read new characters, and as a someone whose first comic was Secret Wars, Stell was delighted by the use of Titania and Absorbing Man, though he thought the story could have been told in one issue instead of three. He also thought the art was effective, but was not enamored of what he thought was an overly-highlighted coloring style. Jesse Schedeen of IGN gave of "Okay" rating of 6.5 out of 10 to issue #20, based on less than ideal scene transitions, bad pacing and Tom Raney's "underwhelming" art, which he felt looked rushed in many pages. Schedeen felt the series overall suffered from lack of focus on the entire team. However, Schedeen would later list it as the twentieth best Avenger story ever told, claiming the series "has never been stronger than when it tied into the events of Fear Itself."

Ray Tate of Comics Bulletin gave 2 out of 5 bullets to Fear Itself: Youth in Revolt #1, attributing this to confusing plotting, implausible behavior on the part of bit characters and lack of independence from the core miniseries. However, he expressed enjoyment of Sean McKeever's characterization of the heroes, in particular Thor Girl, as well as Mike Norton and Veronica Gandini's art. Tate gave the next two issues 5 out of 5 bullets, however, again mentioning his enjoyment of Thor Girl and the art team's work in issue #2, and the Hardball story in issue #3. Jesse Schedeen at IGN gave the first two issues "Good" ratings of 7 and 7.5, impressed with how many characters McKeever was able to fit and properly define in the series, but unimpressed with how McKeever failed to make abstract fear concept palpable, or to distinguish the book from other tie-ins with similar concepts. Schedeen gave "Great" ratings of 8 out of 10 to the next two issues, for the gravitas in the books that the main miniseries lacked, in particular the brutal death scene, which he contrasted with to Bucky's death scene in Fear Itself #3, for how McKeever's handling of the heroes' internal conflict, and his development of Gravity. Schedeen likened the depiction of the low point of the Initiative's crisis to the classic Marvel Team-Up #41 (1975) in which Spider-Man was trapped under tons of rubble. Schedeen consistently had kind words for Norton's "clean, expressive pencils". Dean Stell of Weekly Comic Book Review gave a "B" and "B+" to the first two issues, pleased with McKeever's ability to write younger characters, in particular Thor Girl, Cloud 9 and Ultragirl, and utilizing B-list and C-list characters, which he felt added depth to the main series. Though he advised readers that it was not essential to the crossover, he enjoyed it more than the first two issues of the core miniseries. He felt the riots, however, marred the story, as he did not think them a believable reaction to "fear". He also said that Norton's art was a "recipe for success".

Alex Evans, who reviewed Invincible Iron Man #504 - 506 for Weekly Comic Book Review, gave the first two issues a "B+", and the third one a "B", lauding writer Matt Fraction for using Iron Man's haunting discovery of Mokk's victims to set a chilling tone and atmosphere of the crossover, reminding Evans of the Minotaur in the Cretan Labyrinth, while still maintaining the unique dynamic and relationship of Stark and Pepper Potts through dialogue. Also singled out was his tying up of the Detroit Steel rivalry from the "Stark Resilient" storyline, and the development of Potts and Cabe. Evans questioned, however, the pacing in issue 504, and the use of runes for dwarven profanity in 506. Evans called Salvador Larroca's art "perfect", specifying his design of Grey Gargoyle/Mokk, and the facial expressions with which he depicted Tony's reactions to the stone Parisians, but criticized his rendition of the dwarves' facial expressions for not matching their dialogue.

Evans gave a "D+", however, to Iron Man 2.0 #5, however, criticizing Nick Spencer for focusing on Iron Fist and the Immortal Weapons rather than the book's star, and the all-set up nature of the story, and Ariel Olivetti for his "unnatural and stiff" artwork, and his "horrendous" computer-generated backgrounds, which according to Evans, were either nonexistent or little more than slightly manipulated photos.

Dean Stell, reviewing Hulk #36 and 37 for Weekly Comic Book Review, graded them "B+" and "A−", repeatedly congratulating writer Jeff Parker for his ability to maintain his ongoing story despite the tie-in. Stell also took notice of Bettie Breitweiser's colors and lighting, which she felt were the only ones that depicted the Worthy in a way that they did not appear to be "Tron-rejects".

Joshua Yehl of IGN gave Fear Itself: Hulk vs Dracula #1 an "Okay" rating of 6 out of 10, citing the dull, formulaic nature of the conflict, which was already seen in numerous other tie-in books. While Yehl thought Ryan Stegman's settings were solid and featured intricately detailed backgrounds, the character work failed to inspire awe or fear. Ryan Schedeen, however, while not feeling the miniseries made the best use of the three-issue format, gave 8.0 "Great" and 7.0 "Good" ratings to issues #2 and #3, respectively, finding the former an enthralling if mindless action romp with tense character drama, and comparing Stegman's style positively to that of Ed McGuinness, while also lamenting that the change of inker and colorist near the end of issue #3 harmed the art's overall quality. Dean Stell of Weekly Comic Book Review gave issue #3 a "B+", citing the political intrigue of Dracula and the various breeds and factions of vampires, the introduction of the Forgiven, the sense that the book created something "new", compared to the other tie-ins that he felt went in circles, the balance between cartooniness and realism in Ryan Stegman's pencils, and the manner in which Mike Babinski and Rick Magyar's inks maintained that strength.

Reviewing Fear Itself: The Black Widow, Kelly Thompson of Comic Book Resources criticized the in media res structure, saying that instead of the payoff demanded by such an approach, the result is an "eye-rolling deus ex machina-like cheat that in any movie-theater would illicit [sic] vocal groans." Though Thompson was pleased with writer Cullen Bunn's pacing, clarity and his handling of the character, and thought Peter Nguyen's art interesting if inconsistent, Thompson found the story heavy-handed, criticized it for employing wordy narration over visual storytelling, and thought the book a throwaway story not relevant to "Fear Itself". Ray Tate gave the book 4 out of 5 bullets, likening the story to "an Alias-like hyperkinetic spy mission" that succeeds where other creators' interpretations of the character failed, and which will satisfy ardent fans of the character. Tate attributed the narrative's fluidity to Peter Nguyen's character designs, which he compared to Peter Chung's Aeon Flux, and also applauded Veronica Gandini's colors. Jesse Schedeen of IGN gave the book a "Good" rating of 7 out of 10, describing it as a pointless tie-in with little effective conflict that does not fit well with the main storyline, albeit an enjoyable one with spy-flavored hijinks, and art that is fluid and energetic, if lacking in facial expressions.

Jesse Schedeen, reviewing Fear Itself: Spider-Man for IGN, gave issue #1 a "Good" rating of 7.5 out of 10, and "Great" ratings of 8.5 and 8 to issues 2 and 3. Despite thinking that the citizens depicted were a bit too archetypal, he felt issue #1 properly covered the effects of the Serpent on the populace that were ignored by Fear Itself #2 that week, including those inflicted on Spider-Man that formed a classic set of insurmountable circumstances for him that rivaled his fight with Morlun in the 2005-2006 "The Other" storyline. Schedeen felt Mike McKone's art was clean and cinematic, but varied between his familiar style and a flat, minimalist one in issue #1. Though issue #2 improved on this, he felt aspects of it were flat and rushed in issue #3. Dean Stell of Weekly gave a "C" grade to the first two issues, saying that while it was not essential to the event, it established the street-level panic caused by it, providing "flavoring" to the crossover's story not present in the core miniseries, and that it featured many fine moments, his favorite of which was Spider-Man's confrontation with J. Jonah Jameson. He nonetheless perceived problems in continuity and in the behavior of the mob attacking the Iranian cabbie. He also thought McKone's art was solid and effective, despite occasional problems in body proportions. James Hunt of Comic Book Resources praised issue #1 for "straddling the crossover line expertly", telling a genuine story rather than serving as an arbitrary tie-in, and for helping to allow the reader to understand the stakes of "Fear Itself" by showing the chaos created in the core miniseries. Though Hunt questioned the book's choice of villain, he was interested enough to see how the story's use of that villain would develop. Hunt also Mike McKone's art and Jeremy Cox's colors, and their decision to depict a red-and-black version of Spider-Man's costume.

Reviewing Fear Itself: The Deep #1, Hunt opined that the book was not an essential tie-in. He criticized the destruction of New Atlantis, without any mention of Utopia, which was supported by New Atlantis. He also thought that the development of Namor, while potentially interesting, did not entirely work. Though he suggested that Defenders fans would enjoy the book's improvised incarnation of that team, and Lee Garbett's art clear and enjoyable, there was little to either complain about or distinguish it. Ray Tate gave the book 4 out of 5 bullets, however, finding the change in the Defenders roster engaging (Loa in particular), and beautifully characterized. Tate also liked the creative team's design of the demons, and their rendition of the cast and their heroics. Jesse Schedeen of IGN rated issue #1 of "Mediocre" 5.5 out 10, finding the characterization at times erratic, inaccurate and flat, in particular that of Namor and Attuma. While Schedeen thought Garbett's art was "functional, if a little cramped" in the underwater scenes, he perceived a sharp divide in quality between his cover and interior work, and the colors to be too dim.

At Comic Book Resources, Zawisza found Fear Itself: The Home Front #1 to be "somewhere between forced and irrelevant". Zawisza criticized the Speedball story for a too-weighty collection of elements that threatened to stall it, and for artist Mike Mayhew's over-reliance on photo reference. Zawisza criticized Peter Milligan's Agents of Atlas story for lacking "pizzazz", a clear direction and consistent characterization, but found Elia Bonetti's art a nice transition between Mayhew's and Howard Chaykin's. Zawisza found the J. Jonah Jameson story "little more than a one-page filler", though useful in reminder the reader of Jameson's presence in the Marvel Universe. Zawisza found Pepe Larraz's art in the Broxton, Oklahoma story to be energetic and clean, and his characters believable. Overall, Zawisza felt the book did not add to "Fear Itself", but was a "nice" read, even if not a "must-read". Jesse Schedeen of IGN gave issue #1 a "Good" rating of 7 out of 10, saying that Gage handled the Speedball story with more depth and gravity than in the Avengers Academy that featured a similar story, and that the exploration of why the Superhuman Registration Act was abolished was welcome, though he questioned if the story was strong enough to go seven issues. Schedeen also enjoyed the story and art of Agents of Atlas, thought the inclusion of the J. Jonah Jameson tale was "bizarre", and felt Jim McCann's Broxton story explored the human element, if not memorably, and that overall, the book was not essential reading. He gave the next two issues "Okay" ratings of 6 and 6.5, explaining that the backup stories should have been trimmed to give more space to the Baldwin story, in which Gage fleshed out Miriam Sharpe, and that while the Agents of Atlas work continued to be solid in issue #2, it failed to make good use of the crossover.

Dean Stell, reviewing Uncanny X-Men #540 - 543 for Weekly Comic Book Review, graded the issues "D+", "C+", "B−" and "D". Stell consistently denounced Greg Land's art, which, despite exhibiting good linework and a cinematic style, suffered, according to Stell, from over-reliance on photo reference, and constant reuse of a limited number of poses and facial expressions, in particular the same face used for all the female characters. Stell also was unimpressed with Land's storytelling, his questionable choice in depicting Cyclops with beard stubble and putting Emma Frost in a cowgirl outfit for no discernible reason, and with Justin Ponsor's color palette and overabundance of highlights. Regarding the writing, he thought the first issue had an average story, and the next two were "pretty good", but disliked the final issue. Although he loved the thrashing that Colossus gave Juggernaut after decades of stories in which the latter dispatched the former, he disliked the Namor-Emma Frost romance, the Kitty-Peter drama, and Cyclops' haughty demeanor toward the Mayor of San Francisco.

Hunt felt that Fear Itself: Uncanny X-Force #1, however, was one of the stronger tie-in books, opining that writer Rob Williams lived up to the standard set by regular X-Force writer Rick Remender, exhibiting a similar density of ideas, well-pitched character work, and the same "fun" of that book, without aping Remender's writing style. However, Hunt felt the story suffered from being almost unrelated to the core "Fear Itself" storyline, and criticized the lack of clarity over the identity of the "unknown superhero" in danger, stating that it failed to invest the reader in his fate. Hunt also felt that Simone Bianchi's art was looser than on his Astonishing X-Men run, and criticized his lack of backgrounds, but enjoyed his intricate visuals and his restrained rendering. Jesse Schedeen of IGN, however, gave each of the three issues "Mediocre" ratings of 5.5, 5.0 and 5.5 out of 10, complaining that the story was barely related to the crossover, that the characterization was "bland" and unengaging, the humor "stilted", that it was entertaining on only a superficial level, and of Simone Bianchi's poorly defined and figure-crowded page construction, bizarre anatomy and storytelling that lacked a proper flow.

Hunt was pleased with Fear Itself: Wolverine #1, in particular its depiction of Wolverine and Melita's relationship, and their contrasting views on informational freedom. Though he saw potential in the otherwise generic S.T.R.I.K.E. mercenaries, he again was displeased that the story had nothing to do with the core "Fear Itself" narrative. While Hunt felt artist Roland Boschi made writer Seth Peck's heavy exposition effective, and found Dan Brown's colors serviceable, he found little inspiring about the book artistically. Poet Mase of IGN gave issue #1 an "Okay" rating of 6.5 out of 10, saying that while he felt the villain's plot was plausible, it was somewhat stifled under the weight of text exposition that should have been handled by the visuals, and was unimpressed by Boschi's art or Dan Brown's colors, with some frames looking unfinished. He felt these issues were resolved by issue #2, which he rated a "Good" 7.5 for being a good middle issue. Nonetheless, while he felt that Peck's focus on the power of fear over rationality, and the buildup of Melita's panic were well-done, he felt her journey through Manhattan to be somewhat aimless, a major plot point dispensed with via a poor plot device, and the final page a letdown. Fear Itself: Wolverine has the lowest score of any tie-in at Comic Book Roundup, with 4.3 out of 10.

Dean Stell, reviewing New Mutants #30 for Weekly Comic Book Review, gave it a "B" for Dan Abnett and Andy Lanning's fun story, its good use of Mephisto, David Lafuente's "A-List" art, whose exaggerated gestures lent itself well to the storytelling, and Val Staples and Chris Sotomayor's colors.

Reviewing Thunderbolts #158 - 162, Stell gave a "B+" to the first and last issues, and a "B" to the middle three, citing writer Jeff Parker's effortless integration of the crossover into the book, his ability to fit large amounts of story into each issue with good pacing and his depiction of tension and relationship development of the team members. Stell also opined that all of the stories by different creators in the anthology issue #159 were good (Parker's Underbolts story in particular). However, he criticized the rehashing of material in issue 158 that was covered in the main miniseries, and Marvel editorial, however for inconsistency in Man-Thing's appearances in different books of the crossover. Stell enjoyed Kev Walker and Declan Shalvey's illustration of individual issues, an improvement over pre-crossover attempts on their part to share the duties, citing Walker's inking in particular, but was slightly disappointed by Valentine de Landro and Matthew Southworth's art, whose storytelling clarity was not substandard in areas, and whose overly buxom depiction of Moonstone clashed with Walker and Shalvey's. Jamil Scalese of Comics Bulletin gave 4 out of 5 bullets to issue #160, also cheered Parker's crossover tie-in abilities, recalling his Thunderbolts work during the 2010 "Shadowland" storyline, and commending Declan Shalvey's rendition of the characters as "superb", and the style he employed when depicting the heroes infiltrating Juggernaut's soul.

Minhquan Nguyen, reviewing Herc #3 - 6 for Weekly Comic Book Review, gave a "B+" to three of the issues, and an "A−" to issue #4. Nguyen appreciated that the minor connection to the crossover did not hijack the book's in-progress storyline, which was filled with action and humor, though he felt the writing in the latter two issues was hurried and underdeveloped. Nguyen praised penciler Neil Edwards' clean, detailed art, and how his design of the mythic characters, combined both classical and modern elements. He also complimented Scott Hanna's inks and Jesus Aburtov's colors. Sam Salama Cohén of Comics Bulletin gave 3.5 bullets to issue #4, celebrating Greg Pak and Fred Van Lente's accurate portrayal of Hercules, a welcome reinvigoration of the character following the "endless Limbo of poor characterization and mockery" to which Cohén felt the Greek hero had thus far been relegated. Cohén also said that Neil Edwards' art style had grown on him, extolling Edwards' depiction of both Hercules' "snarkiness" and his bold resolve. Though Cohén felt the book was a good follow up on the previous story arc, he felt it lacked that story's perfect mix of humor, action and foreboding.

Alex Evans of Weekly Comic Book Review gave a "C+" to Ghost Rider #1, opining that the book featured some excellent ideas and solid artwork by Matthew Clark that were hampered by the crossover and some at times "sketchy" writing, which included flat humor, overwritten dialogue, the relegation of expository material to the backup story and an unlikable protagonist threatening children.

Doug Zawisza found Fear Itself: Fearsome Four #1's attempt to marry the disparate art styles of Michael Kaluta, Ryan Bodenheim, and Simon Bisley uneven and inconsistent (in particular their different renderings of Howard the Duck), even though each artist served their purpose, with the result reading like "a poor man's anthology that's written to fill a projected collected edition than a coherent run at a single tale." Zawisza thought the book was "slow and choppy", the characters an "odd assortment", and not worth the price of the next issue. At Comics Bulletin, Ray Tate gave four bullets and three bullets to issues 1 and 2, respectively, saying that in the first issue, Montclare's characterization was authentic and exhibited pathos, and Kaluta adept in his rendition of Nighthawk, recalling his previous work on DC Comics' equivalent character, but was somewhat perplexed by the resemblance of Bodenheim's Howard the Duck to the feature film version. Regarding issue #2, he thought Montclare's exposition of Frankenstein's whereabouts since the 1970s was intelligent, and Ryan Bodenheim's art strong, but thought Montclare's characterization of Nighthawk gratuitous and implausible, and found Bisley's art "scratchy, unattractive and often confusing". Jesse Schedeen of IGN gave issue #1 a "Mediocre" rating of 5.5, saying that despite the clever premise, citing a lack of emotional appeal or any narrative rationale in the choice of the book's cast, the inconsistent tone, and an artist roster that creates a "jumbled" feel. Dean Stell of Weekly Comic Book Review gave the issue a grade of "D", saying that it had an acceptable premise that was badly executed, citing the choice of characters used in the story, and Bodenheim's art, which deviated from his usual style, and in some areas looked rushed, or appeared to be an attempt to ape Mike Kaluta's style.

Danny Djeljosevic and Nick Hanover of Comics Bulletin gave 3 out of 5 bullets to Alpha Flight #1, seeing its tie-in to "Fear Itself" as a forced way to use the crossover to gain attention for that team, while only paying lip service to the crossover's storyline. They also complained about the heavy handed opening scenes, the lack of exposition that would make "Fear Itself" aspects of the story confusing to readers of the trade paperback and problematic characterizations of Shaman and Snowbird. The reviewers were both disappointed with the art, with Hanover criticizing Dale Eaglesham for "the worst artistic interpretation of Vancouver I've ever seen". Joshua Yehl of Broken Frontier thought Pak and Van Lente succeeded in evoking a sense of dread, as well as a sense of natural humor, and described Eaglesham's art as "masterful throughout." Dean Stell of Weekly Comic Book Review gave the issue a "B" for recapturing the feel of the 1980s series, and describing it as "mostly a big, fast-paced fight scene that works really well and is enjoyable to read", though he was disinterested by the political aspects of the plot, and disliked the use of Northstar.

Dean Stell of Weekly Comic Book Review gave Fear Itself: Deadpool #1 a "C+", saying that while the story's lack of impact on the crossover made it inessential reading, the concept of Deadpool's attempt to exploit the global panic upheld the book's signature tongue-in-cheek tone, and Bong Dazo's art fit this tone well. Jesse Schedeen of IGN gave issue #1 an "Okay" rating of 6.0, expressing the view that Deadpool's exploitation of a suburban family's paranoia and fear was so close sentiments in the aftermath of the September 11 attacks that writer Christopher Hastings struck at the heart of the crossover's core ideas, and that although some elements were characterized by dawdling exposition, spoilers and heavy-handed attempts at humor, penciller Bong Dazo was adroitly brought the physical humor to life. However, Schedeen gave issue #3 an "Awful" rating of 3.5, saying that Hastings' "painful" script consisted of a truncated plot, forced, unfunny cultural references, unresolved plot holes, and a nonsensical ending, and that despite Dazo's art, he advised readers not to buy the book.

=== Epilogue and aftermath book reviews ===
Erik Norris of IGN Fear Itself #7.1: Captain America a "Great" rating of 8.5 out of 10, saying that Ed Brubaker and Jackson Guice offer more substantial content than in the entire core miniseries, calling it a "must-read" for Captain America fans, including those who did not like the "Fear Itself" event, and saying that Brubaker admirably redeems the poor depiction of Bucky's death in the miniseries. Norris gave Fear Itself #7.2: Thor a "Good" rating of 7 out of 10, saying that Matt Fraction's subtle, vague handling of Thor's death and resurrection properly utilized meta concepts that incorporated the event into Norse mythology. Norris also praised Fraction's handling of Spider-Man. He was disappointed with Adam Kubert's art, however, in spite of the fact that he is a fan of Kubert, finding the artist's choice of panel layout and composition perplexing.

Joey Esposito of IGN gave a 7 out of 10 "Good" rating to Fear Itself: The Fearless #1, saying that while it is not essential reading, nor an enticement to read the crossover, it provided a fun, enjoyable setup for ongoing stories featuring Sin and Valkyrie, despite some instances of flat dialogue. Esposito also noted the strengths and weaknesses of artists Paul Pelletier, Danny Miki, Matthew Wilson and Mark Bagley, saying, "Neither artist completely nails it out of the park to the best of their ability, but the book gets well enough to entice the reader's eyeballs."

== In other media ==
- The "Fear Itself" storyline is adapted in Marvel: Avengers Alliance. In this version of the story, She-Hulk is Skirn, Luke Cage is Nul, Spider-Woman is Kuurth, Mockingbird is Nerkkrod, Daimon Hellstrom is Angrir, Black Knight is Mokk and Ghost Rider is Greithoth.
- Zen Studios developed a virtual pinball adaptation of the limited comics series in 2012 as part of the four Avengers Chronicles tables as downloadable content for Marvel Pinball, Zen Pinball 2, Pinball FX 2 and Pinball FX 3. This table features voice acting, animated figures and missions that involve battling the several Worthy that the Serpent summons.

== Titles involved ==
=== Prologue ===
- Fear Itself: Book of the Skull #1

=== Core miniseries ===
- Fear Itself #1-7

=== Tie-ins ===
- Fear Itself: Black Widow #1
- Fear Itself: Deadpool #1-3
- Fear Itself: The Deep #1-4
- Fear Itself: FF #1
- Fear Itself: Fearsome Four #1-4
- Fear Itself: Fellowship of Fear #1
- Fear Itself: The Home Front #1-7
- Fear Itself: Hulk Vs. Dracula #1-3
- Fear Itself: The Monkey King #1
- Fear Itself: Sin's Past #1
- Fear Itself: Spider-Man #1-3
- Fear Itself: Spotlight #1
- Fear Itself: Uncanny X-Force #1-3
- Fear Itself: Youth in Revolt #1-6
- Fear Itself: The Worthy #1
- Fear Itself: Wolverine #1-3
- Alpha Flight #1-4
- Avengers Academy #15-20
- Avengers #13-17
- Black Panther: The Man Without Fear #521-523
- Ghost Rider (vol. 7) #1-4
- Heroes for Hire #9-11
- Herc #3-6
- Hulk #37-38
- Iron Man 2.0 #5-7
- The Invincible Iron Man #503-509
- Journey into Mystery #622-630
- New Avengers #14-16
- New Mutants #29-32
- Secret Avengers #13-15
- Thunderbolts #158-162
- Tomb of Dracula Presents: Throne of Blood #1
- Uncanny X-Men #540-543
- The Mighty Thor #7

=== Epilogue and aftermath ===
- Fear Itself #7.1: Captain America
- Fear Itself #7.2: Thor
- Fear Itself #7.3: Iron Man
- Battle Scars #1-6
- Fear Itself: The Fearless #0-12

=== Miscellaneous ===
- Fear Itself Sketchbook #1
- Fear Itself: Fellowship of Fear #1

== Collected editions ==
Title	Material collected	Published date	ISBN
Fear Itself	Fear Itself #1-7, Fear Itself Prologue: Book of the Skull #1	January 2012	978-0785156628
Fear Itself: Avengers	Avengers (vol. 4) #13-17, New Avengers (vol. 2) #14-16	January 2012	978-0785163480
Fear Itself: Avengers Academy	Avengers Academy #14-20, 14.1	March 2012	978-0785152002
Fear Itself: Black Panther	Black Panther: The Man Without Fear #519-523, Black Panther: The Deadliest Man Alive #524	March 2012	978-0785158103
Fear Itself: Deadpool / Fearsome Four	Fear Itself: Deadpool #1-3, Fear Itself: Fearsome Four #1-4	February 2012	978-0785158073
Fear Itself: Dracula	Fear Itself: Hulk Vs Dracula #1-3, Tomb of Dracula Presents: Throne of Blood #1, Death of Dracula #1	April 2012	978-0785163503
Fear Itself: Ghost Rider	Ghost Rider (vol. 7) #1-5, 0.1	January 2012	978-0785158097
Fear Itself: Herc	Herc #1-6	March 2012	978-0785147206
Fear Itself: Heroes For Hire	Heroes For Hire (vol. 3) #6-12	February 2012	978-0785157953
Fear Itself: Hulk	Hulk (vol. 2) #37-41	February 2012	978-0785155799
Fear Itself: Hulk/Dracula	Fear Itself: Hulk Vs Dracula #1-3, Hulk (vol. 2) #37-41	November 2012	978-0785155805
Fear Itself: Invincible Iron Man	Invincible Iron Man #504-509, Fear Itself #7.3: Iron Man	March 2012	978-0785157731
Fear Itself: Journey Into Mystery	Journey Into Mystery #622-626	February 2012	978-0785148401
Fear Itself Fallout: Journey Into Mystery	Journey Into Mystery #626.1, 627-631	October 2012	978-0785152620
Fear Itself: Secret Avengers	Secret Avengers (vol. 1) #12.1, 13-15, Fear Itself: Black Widow #1	February 2012	978-0785151777
Fear Itself: Spider-Man	Fear Itself: Spider-Man #1-3, Fear Itself: The Worthy #1, Fear Itself: FF #1	April 2012	978-0785158042
Fear Itself: The Fearless	Fear Itself: The Fearless #1-12	May 2012	978-0785163435
Fear Itself: The Home Front	Fear Itself: The Home Front #1-7	April 2012	978-0785163893
Fear Itself: Thunderbolts	Thunderbolts #158-162	February 2012	978-0785157984
Fear Itself: Uncanny X-Force / The Deep	Fear Itself: Uncanny X-Force #1-3, Fear Itself: The Deep #1-4	March 2012	978-0785157960
Fear Itself: Uncanny X-Men	Uncanny X-Men #540-544	March 2012	978-0785157977
Fear Itself: Wolverine / New Mutants	Fear Itself: Wolverine #1-3, New Mutants (vol. 3) #29-32	April 2012	978-0785158080
Fear Itself: Youth In Revolt	Fear Itself: Youth in Revolt #1-6	April 2012	978-0785157014
Shattered Heroes	Fear Itself #7.1: Captain America, Fear Itself #7.2: Thor, Fear Itself #7.3: Iron Man, Point One #1	March 2012	978-0785163459
