= Marvel Avengers Alliance =

2012 video game

- Developer: Offbeat Creations
- Publisher: Playdom
- Directors: Bill Rosemann; Chia Chin Lee; Michael Rubinelli; Robert Reichner
- Producers: Justin Woods (2012–2014); Tony Sherrill (2014–2016); Julia Fredrickson
- Designers: Josh Billeaudeau; Ben Batstone-Cunningham; Zach Franks; Andrew Aleshire; Hal Milton; CJ Heine; Creighton Evans
- Artists: Sam Wood; Kelly Hamilton; Leigh Kellogg; Darran Hurlbut
- Writer: Alex Irvine
- Engine: Adobe Flash
- Platforms: Facebook, iOS, Android
- Release: March 1, 2012
- Genre: Role-playing
- Mode: Single-player

Marvel Avengers Alliance was a 2012 turn-based social-network game developed by American studio Offbeat Creations and published by Playdom. It is based on characters and storylines published by Marvel Comics. The game was available as an Adobe Flash application via the social-networking website Facebook. It launched in Facebook on March 1, 2012. It was initially released as promotion for the 2012 Marvel Studios film The Avengers.

It was made available on iOS and Android devices on June 13, 2013. The game was shut on September 30, 2016.

== Gameplay ==
Players control an agent of S.H.I.E.L.D. and can customize the agent by gaining experience, leveling up, and equipping their agents with weapons and uniforms obtained within the game. The player can team up with two of 166 Marvel heroes in the game, each with their unique skills and abilities. While some heroes are locked and can only be recruited on some occasions, most of them are available for general recruitment, and can be bought with "Command Points", one of the currencies that appears in the game.

Gameplay consists of turn-based fights that pit the player's agent and heroes against one or more waves of three or fewer enemies, with each character having unique attacks. There are six character classes: Blaster, Bruiser, Scrapper, Infiltrator, Tactician and Generalist. The first five classes have a specific strength and a specific weakness to one of the other classes, in a rock-paper-scissors style. Blasters have guaranteed critical hits against Bruisers and ignore their defense stats. Bruisers increase their statistics when they attack or are attacked by Scrappers. Scrappers have a second automatic attack (follow-up attack) against Infiltrators. Infiltrators gain the ability to counter enemies' attacks after attacking or being attacked by Tacticians, while the latter gain an extra turn when they attack or are attacked by Blasters. The Generalist class has no special strengths or weaknesses against other classes. Some playable heroes can switch classes during the game, and a character's class may be changed with alternate costumes. The player has access to uniforms of all the classes.

=== Collections ===
Collections are a feature used to recruit new characters to your team, most of whom were previously Villains. It was first unveiled as part of Special Operations - Cry Havok.

Collections can be completed by opening Lockboxes to collect Comic Book Covers. Collecting all eight unique Covers of the Collection will unlock the Hero.

=== Player Vs. Player (PVP) ===
For a limited time, Player Vs. Player (PVP) tournaments are available where the players fight to reach different tiers (Silver, Gold, Diamond, Vibranium and Adamantium). Players who placed at Adamantium tier at the end of the PvP season are awarded a new hero. PvP fighting can also be done during non-tournament times in practice mode only.

=== Special Operations (Spec Ops) ===
Special Operations are limited time challenges in which the player has to complete, at least, 25 tasks in order to obtain a new hero. Unique boss items can be acquired through battle, and special weapons or items are rewarded for every 5 tasks completed. The only exception has been the first Spec Ops mission, in which the player had to get 5 star mastery in all the missions.

=== Daily Missions ===
The daily mission is a 24-hour limited mission. These missions award elite rewards when completed and also include certain restrictions to be played. After the 24-hour window ends the mission is exchanged for a different one and any cumulative score the player had is returned to zero.

=== Simulator ===
The S.H.I.E.L.D. Simulator is composed of two parts: Challenges and Villain Archive. The Challenges are a set of difficult fights with special conditions and rules which, if completed, earn the player a reward. The Villain Archive provides a brief biography of each villain and also a free fight simulation against them.

== Plot ==
The player is a new S.H.I.E.L.D. recruit, dispatched by Nick Fury and Maria Hill, as an unknown event, referred as "The Pulse" causes a strange material known as Iso-8 to emerge on Earth. The material has various properties, but is primarily used in the game to power up characters. The player is charged with joining various heroes in battle to take down numerous villains who are all aiming to gather and use Iso-8 for their own nefarious purposes. As the game advances, more heroes join the conflict as playable characters. The game had 2 seasons; Season 1 was an original plot where Hydra was eventually revealed to be using Iso-8 to resurrect Red Skull, which results in Magneto turning over to fight alongside S.H.I.E.L.D.; Many other villains would follow suit. Season 2 was heavily inspired by the Fear Itself story-line but also contained other details such as Incursions as part of Time Runs Out, that would eventually lead into Secret Wars. Season 2 ended with the defeat of the Serpent, at the cost of the lives of Thor and Jane Foster (as Mighty Thor, who arrived via Incursion).

== Development ==
Season 2 was expected to be released on the 18th of June, 2013 and featured new heroes and villains. On the 18th, Playdom said there would be a hold on its release. Season 2 was released on August 1.

The game was available as a Facebook game. Playdom tried to migrate from it, first by hosting the game on their own page as well, and then by making Marvel Avengers Alliance 2 available only as a cell phone application. However, the Facebook community remained big.

=== End ===
Disney announced the end of the game on September 1, 2016. It was the end for both Marvel: Avengers Alliance and Marvel: Avengers Alliance 2, which had been released early in the year, in all platforms. The games were no longer available for new downloads or accept online payments, but were still available for players for a month. A final Special Operation was released, to close the plot of the game. The game completely ceased to be available on September 30.

== Related games ==
=== Marvel: Avengers Alliance Tactics ===
A related game to Marvel: Avengers Alliance was called Marvel: Avengers Alliance Tactics, which Playdom made for Facebook. Launched in June 2014, Tactics took the gameplay mechanics built in the original and applied them to an isometric 3D map, with the player choosing four of their agents or heroes for each mission. The game was shut down on October 22.

=== Marvel Avengers Alliance 2 ===
A mobile-only sequel to Marvel Avengers Alliance, Marvel Avengers Alliance 2 was released in the Philippines on July 27, 2015, and worldwide on March 30, 2016. It has new characters as well as being in 3D. Disney canceled the game on September 30.
