= Grey Gargoyle =

Fictional comic book character

- The Grey Gargoyle battles Thor on the cover of Journey into Mystery #107 (Aug. 1964). Art by Jack Kirby.

Publication information
- Publisher: Marvel Comics
- First appearance: Journey into Mystery #107 (Aug. 1964)
- Created by: Stan Lee (writer); Jack Kirby (artist)

In-story information
- Alter ego: Paul Pierre Duval
- Species: Human mutate
- Team affiliations: Masters of Evil; A.I.M. The Worthy; Lethal Legion; Hood's crime syndicate
- Notable aliases: Paul St. Pierre, Mokk: Breaker of Faith, Medusa X
- Abilities: Genius chemist Superhuman strength and durability Petrification

Grey Gargoyle (Paul Pierre Duval) is a supervillain appearing in American comic books published by Marvel Comics. The character was created by Stan Lee and Jack Kirby and first appeared in Journey into Mystery #107 (August 1964). Duval is a French chemist who gave himself the ability to petrify anything via his right hand. Originally appearing as an enemy of Thor, Grey Gargoyle has battled various other heroes throughout his publication history. During the storyline Fear Itself, Grey Gargoyle was temporarily transformed into Mokk, one of the Serpent's Worthy.

The character has made appearances in various media outside comics, including animated series and video games. Chris Wiggins, Ed Gilbert, and Troy Baker voice Grey Gargoyle in The Marvel Super Heroes, Iron Man, and The Avengers: Earth's Mightiest Heroes respectively.

== Publication history ==
The Grey Gargoyle first appeared in Journey into Mystery #107 (Aug. 1964) and was created by Stan Lee and Jack Kirby.

== Fictional character biography ==
Paul Pierre Duval is a French chemist whose right hand was transformed into stone following a chemical accident, granting the ability to petrify anything it touches. Duval becomes bored and attempts to achieve immortality by confronting Thor and stealing his hammer, Mjolnir. Thor defeats Grey Gargoyle by luring him into the Hudson River in New York City, leaving him buried at the bottom. The Grey Gargoyle eventually reappears after being hauled up from the river, whereupon he turns the two people examining him to stone. Believing that Blake can help him find Thor, the Grey Gargoyle goes after him. He pursues them through the streets, becoming angry at their escaping him and finally deciding to eliminate Blake. However he is delayed by an Asgardian blinding him with an arrow that gives off light, after which the Asgardian restores Thor's power. The Grey Gargoyle is incapacitated by Thor once again as he uses his hammer to trap the Grey Gargoyle by tapping a lamppost as a power source and sending a bolt which fuses Grey Gargoyle's limbs. Odin then fully restores Thor's power.

An appearance in the title Marvel Team-Up against Captain America and fellow hero Spider-Man ends with Grey Gargoyle being trapped in a rocket and launched into deep space. The character reappears in the title Thor, and is revealed to have been rescued by the crew of the alien spaceship the Bird of Prey and nominated their captain. After a battle with Thor the character is lost in space once again. The character reappears in the title as part of Helmut Zemo's incarnation of the Masters of Evil. In an encounter with the Avenger the Black Knight, Grey Gargoyle grasps the hero's enchanted sword and is reverted to human form, his power temporarily neutralized.

Grey Gargoyle is recruited to join a "crime army" formed by the villain the Hood in the title The New Avengers. During the "Dark Reign" storyline, the Grim Reaper recruits Grey Gargoyle into a new incarnation of the Lethal Legion, who oppose Norman Osborn.

In Fear Itself, Grey Gargoyle obtains one of the Serpent's hammers and becomes Mokk, the Breaker of Faith. Mokk transforms the entire population of Paris to stone. When Iron Man intervenes, Mokk damages his armor and energy supply, forcing him to flee. Mokk is reverted to Grey Gargoyle by the end of the storyline, and Odin returns those he affected to normal.

In a lead-up to the "Sins Rising" arc, Count Nefaria forms a new version of the Lethal Legion with Grey Gargoyle, Living Laser, and Whirlwind in a plot to target the Catalyst. The Lethal Legion attack Empire State University and confront Spider-Man, but are attacked by Sin-Eater. Sin-Eater uses his gun to steal the powers and sins of the Lethal Legion's members. When they are sent to Ravencroft, the villains act as model inmates. It is implied that their sins being stolen affected their behavior. After Sin-Eater's death, the Lethal Legion's members regain their sins.

== Powers and abilities ==
During an experiment, Paul Duval spilled an unknown organic chemical compound on his right hand, causing a mutagenic reaction that permanently transformed his hand into living stone. Duval can turn any matter touched with his stone hand to a similar substance, with the effect lasting for approximately one hour. Duval can also use the effect to transform himself into a being of living stone who possesses superhuman strength and durability, with his mobility being unhindered.

== In other media ==
=== Television ===
- The Grey Gargoyle appears in the "Mighty Thor" segment of The Marvel Super Heroes, voiced by Chris Wiggins.
- The Grey Gargoyle appears in Iron Man, voiced by Ed Gilbert, with additional dialogue provided by Jim Cummings.
- The Grey Gargoyle appears in the Iron Man: Armored Adventures episode "Doomsday". This version was created by the original Mandarin to guard one of his Makluan rings and test potential successors.
- The Grey Gargoyle appears in The Avengers: Earth's Mightiest Heroes, voiced by Troy Baker. This version is a member of the Masters of Evil until he is killed by the Executioner.

=== Video games ===
- Grey Gargoyle appears in The Amazing Spider-Man and Captain America in Dr. Doom's Revenge!.
- Grey Gargoyle appears as a boss in Marvel: Ultimate Alliance, voiced by Tom Kane. This version is a former member of Doctor Doom's Masters of Evil who joined the Mandarin in leaving the group when the latter failed to take command.
- Grey Gargoyle appears as a boss in Marvel: Ultimate Alliance 2, voiced by Joe Roseto.
- Grey Gargoyle appears as a boss in Marvel: Avengers Alliance.
