= Broxton, Oklahoma =

Unincorporated community in Oklahoma, US

- Unincorporated community
- Location within the state of Oklahoma Broxton (the United States)
- Coordinates: 34°59′09″N 98°24′33″W
- Country: United States
- State: Oklahoma
- County: Caddo
- Elevation: 1,434 ft (437 m)
- Time zone: UTC-6 (Central (CST))
  - Summer (DST): UTC-5 (CDT)
- GNIS feature ID: 1100239

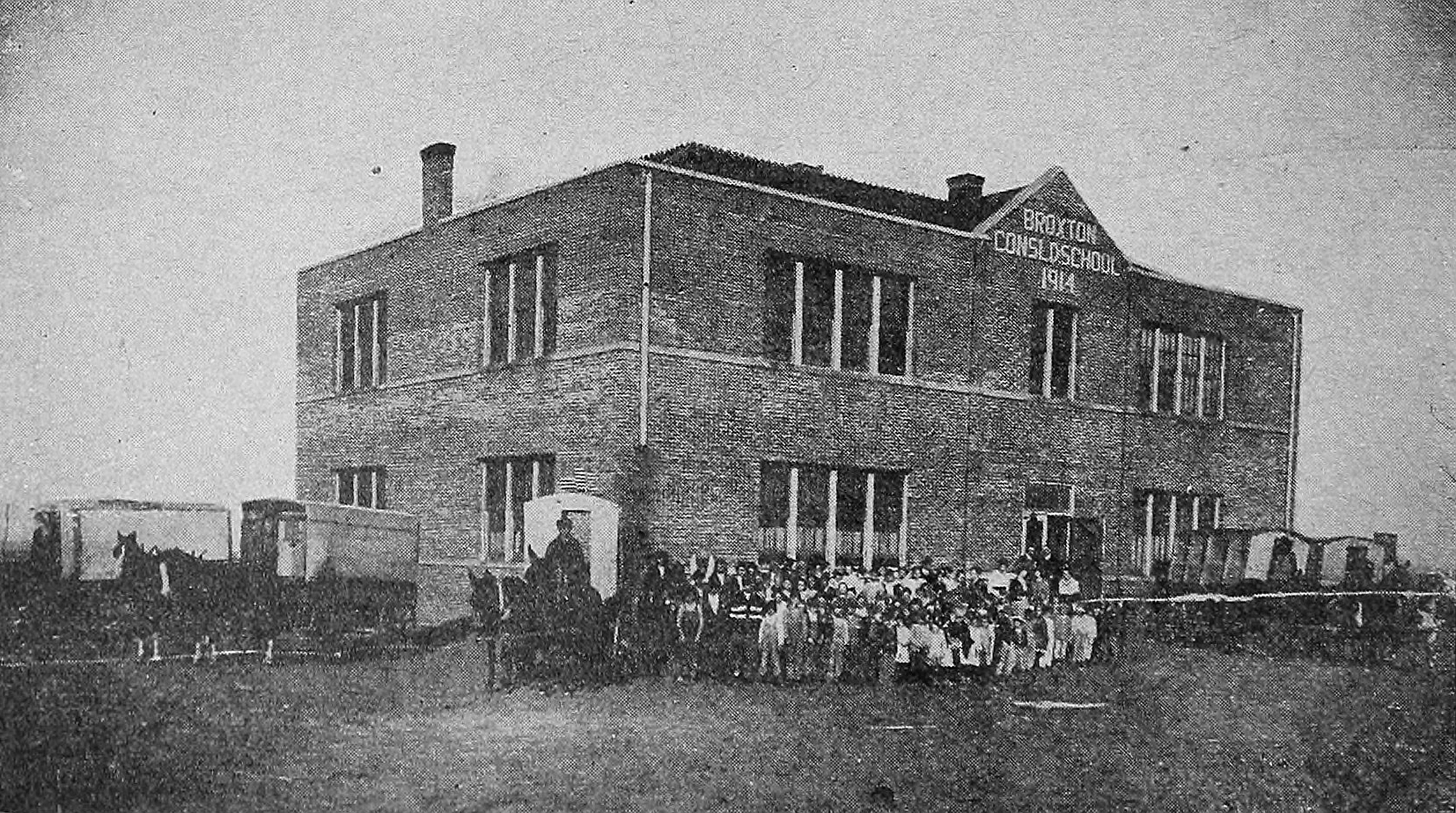
Broxton Consolidated School, 1918

Broxton is an unincorporated community in Caddo County, Oklahoma, United States.

It was originally intended to form an actual town with 50 town lots.

Broxton had an independent school district until the 1990s, but it was consolidated with the Fort Cobb school district, becoming Fort Cobb-Broxton Public Schools

The community of Pine Ridge was also served by the Broxton school district.

== Broxton in fiction ==
Broxton and the surrounding regions have been an important setting of Marvel Comics' series Thor since the late 2000s. The Norse god Thor's home Asgard became a floating landmass outside of Broxton. Although the Asgardians were welcomed by the locals, in the 2011 miniseries Fear Itself, Odin, resentful of being made the recipient of humans' altruism, and sensing the return of an ancient enemy, leads his people back to Asgard's former location.

Broxton is featured in the Marvel Cinematic Universe live-action series Loki (2023), appearing in the second season. This version is located in an alternate timeline branched off from the Sacred Timeline and becomes Sylvie's temporary home.
