= Weekly Comic Book Review =

Blog about comic books

Weekly Comic Book Review (WCBR) is an American blog founded by Jason Montes focusing on reviews of newly issued comic books with occasional reviews of graphic novels or comic book related television programs and movies.

The blog is valuable to comic book fans, providing current and upcoming comic book reviews so readers can get a critic's perspective before deciding to purchase. WCBR is also important to comic book authors who receive feedback on their work from reviewers and readers who discuss comics on the site like any other literary work. Reviews from WCBR are often reprinted and referred to as authoritative and thoughtful reviews.

Young Liars used a review written by WCBR to promote issue #4, quoting and crediting them on the front page of their comic as follows, "not a panel of line of dialogue that's meaningless or wasted." The comic reviews by WCBR were also cited on the backs of issues 2, 3, and 5 of Kick Ass.

In the late 90s, founder Montes worked as a journalist for IGN and PlayStation: The Official Magazine. In 1998 he began to work for a web consulting firm, and hoped to work in film animation. He started Weekly Comic Book Review, with his first post on January 17, 2008, under the name "deamentia". In the following months, Montes began recruiting members of the comic community to write for his blog.

Montes died in January 2009, and the blog lost soon its domain. According to Weekly Comic Book Review, the domain expired and was purchased by a domain reseller who requested a large sum for the name. On April 20, 2009 the magazine received an anonymous donation and was able to buy back the domain.
