= Impossible Man =

Fictional character

- The Impossible Man taken from a variant cover of Fantastic Four #32 (May 2025). Art by Joshua Cassara.

Publication information
- Publisher: Marvel Comics
- First appearance: Fantastic Four #11 (February 1963)
- Created by: Stan Lee (writer); Jack Kirby (artist)

In-story information
- Species: Poppupian
- Team affiliations: Fantastic Four; Lethal Legion
- Notable aliases: Impy; Herald of Destruction; The Improbable Guy
- Abilities: Shapeshifting; Levitation; Dimensional travel; Encyclopedic knowledge of Earth's culture

The Impossible Man is a fictional character appearing in American comic books published by Marvel Comics. He first appeared in Fantastic Four #11 (February 1963), and was created by writer Stan Lee and writer/artist Jack Kirby. The Impossible Man has been featured in other Marvel-endorsed products such as action figures, arcade and video games, animated television series, and merchandise such as trading cards.

The Impossible Man is a Poppupian from the planet Poppup and has shape-changing abilities. The character is primarily used for comedy, as he is portrayed as a lonely, attention-seeking alien that often annoys those around him, especially the Fantastic Four. Over the years, the Impossible Man created a wife called The Impossible Woman and also had a son named Adolf Impossible.

The Impossible Man has made various appearances in Marvel animated series, such as the 1978 and 1994 Fantastic Four series as well as Fantastic Four: World's Greatest Heroes.

== Publication history ==
The Impossible Man first appeared in Fantastic Four #11 (February 1963), and was created by Stan Lee and Jack Kirby. According to Lee in a 1970 interview, this "was the worst-selling Fantastic Four we've ever had". In Lee's opinion, the green alien on the cover was "too unusual and too frivolous."

After a long absence, Impossible Man returned in Fantastic Four #175 (October 1976) and visited the Marvel Comics office. At the end of the story, he was adopted by the Fantastic Four. This time, the character became popular. He remained a regular part of the comic until #195 (June 1978), when Sue told him that she was tired of him, and he turned into a bee and flew away.

Originally, there were no limits to Impossible Man's transforming abilities - he convincingly imitated Sue Richards in Fantastic Four #175 (October 1976) and Jimmy Carter in Marvel Two-in-One #27 (May 1977). The New Mutants Annual #3 (September 1987) introduced the limitation that all of his transformations share his green and purple color scheme.

== Fictional character biography ==
=== 1960s ===
The Fantastic Four first encounter Impossible Man at the Flamingo restaurant when they are summoned there to investigate a disturbance. Written by Lee to be a prankster and hedonist, the Impossible Man claimed to belong to the alien race of Poppupians from planet Poppup in the "Tenth Galaxy", who all share a collective consciousness and the ability to shapeshift, as their planet is so dangerous they have the ability to evolve very quickly. Seeking amusement, Impossible Man visits Earth for a vacation by turning himself into a spaceship, talking of a Poppup Tourist Bureau. After finding the superhero team the Fantastic Four and realizing nobody else on Earth has his power (therefore concluding he is the most powerful being on Earth), he constantly harasses them until they decide to ignore him and tell other people to do the same, forcing the Impossible Man to leave as he finds Earth so boring, and saying Earth will never get their tourist business. He gets his name after the Thing claims he is "impossible".

=== 1970s ===
Impossible Man did not appear again until 1976. Acting as a deus ex machina in a storyline involving the cosmic entity and world-devourer Galactus, the Impossible Man convinces him to consume Poppup instead of Earth, causing Galactus to seemingly die from 'cosmic indigestion'. Since the Poppupians were a shared consciousness they were happy to sacrifice their planet to stop Galactus, knowing that their culture would live on in the embodiment of its most adventurous member. The Impossible Man then makes a humorous appearance at the offices of Marvel Comics, where he causes havoc until Stan Lee promises to give him his own title.

He offers peripheral assistance to the Fantastic Four when they are trapped in the Negative Zone by the Frightful Four, a team of their enemies. The Impossible Man impersonates Jimmy Carter on the day of his inauguration. The Impossible Man briefly takes Carter's place to foil an attempt to enslave him during an adventure with the Thing and the cyborg Deathlok. He later saves the Invisible Woman from a fall and becomes fascinated with Earth movies. When returning to the Baxter Building, headquarters of the Fantastic Four, the Impossible Man is surprised and defeated by Klaw. Impossible Man recovers and, with his abilities, mimics and defeats Klaw in turn and assists the Fantastic Four in stopping the Molecule Man.

=== 1980s ===
After helping the Thing defeat several villains at a party, the Impossible Man observes the Thing with his partner Alicia Masters and becomes lonely. Impossible Man then decides to reproduce - here an asexual process - by splitting in two. This creates fellow Poppupian the Impossible Woman. The pair later attempt to recreate their race and create the Impossible Kids, with the entire "family" visiting the Thing. When the Impossible Woman is missing, Impossible Man hires Jessica Drew to locate her, and has an encounter with the X-Men after stealing artifacts from Earth to settle a supposed family dispute with the other members of his race.

More comedic adventures followed, with the Impossible Man engaging in a shapeshifting competition with Warlock, causing havoc on an alternate universe version of Earth, and trying to obtain the movie rights to the autobiography of professional sidekick Rick Jones.

=== 1990s ===
The Impossible Man finds and teases the cosmic being the Silver Surfer on two occasions, pleading for him to develop a sense of humor before battling the titan Thanos. Impossible Man returns to Earth and causes more mischief, encounters the hero Daredevil while looking for a lost child, starts a bar fight, watches the Eternal Makkari win a galactic marathon, and invites various otherwise un-contacted heroes and supervillains to the wedding of Rick Jones.

After a brief encounter with the New Warriors, Impossible Man enlists the aid of mutant team X-Force to instill some pride in his children, and enters into a wager with the alternate universe imp Mister Mxyzptlk.

=== 2000s ===
The Impossible Man returns to Earth disguised as the Silver Surfer, and after teasing the hero Spider-Man warns of an alien invasion. The Impossible Man's race are also revealed to have survived, with their consciousness stored inside him. With the aid of the Fantastic Four, the aliens and the reborn Poppupians are transported off world, merging into one race on Spider-Man's suggestion.

=== 2010s ===
Later during the Chaos War, the Impossible Man confronts Amatsu-Mikaboshi, trying to humor and reason with him while shapeshifting in various forms to divert him, but Amatsu-Mikaboshi tires of him and brutally dispatches him.

Impossible Man witnesses a battle between Hulk, Red Hulk, and Xemnu and uses the Valizian Compounder to fuse Hulk and Red Hulk into the Compound Hulk. Impossible Man watches as the Compound Hulk fights Xemnu's minion Kluh, a smart version of the Gray Hulk.

Impossible Man is later shown to have a son named Adolf Impossible, who has many of his father's fantastic powers and a more introverted personality. This causes Impossible Man to label Adolf as "entirely too possible" and plead with the Future Foundation to accept him and allow him to grow as a person.

== Powers and abilities ==
The Impossible Man's unique physiology enables him to take on virtually any form via molecular manipulation, an effect commonly accompanied by a "Pop!" sound. He can mimic the properties of objects or humanoid beings at will. Almost every feature the Impossible Man copies another superhuman's appearance and their powers, such as Thor, Klaw, or even Wolverine. He has the ability to travel through hyperspace across different universes, psionically levitate himself, and reproduce asexually. Additionally, he can survive in the vacuum of space by entering a low-metabolic state.

The Impossible Man possesses total knowledge of Earth's popular culture.

== Reception ==
In 2014, ComicBook.com ranked Impossible Man sixth in their "Top 10 Most Filmworthy Fantastic Four Villains" list.

== Other versions ==
=== Wha...Huh? ===
Impossible Man appears in the spoof comic "Wha...Huh?" in the segment titled "What If Identity Crisis Happened in the Marvel Universe".

=== The Cross-Time Caper ===
The Impossible Man appears in Excalibur, during the Cross-Time Caper. He has populated an analogue of the Earth with multiple twisted versions of the superheroes of the Marvel Universe. Galactus destroys this planet, deeming it "too silly to be allowed to exist", but Impossible Man later effortlessly restores it.

== In other media ==
=== Television ===
- Impossible Man appears in a self-titled episode of The New Fantastic Four, voiced by Frank Welker.
- Impossible Man appears in the Fantastic Four (1994) episode "Hopelessly Impossible", voiced by Jess Harnell.
- Impossible Man appears in Fantastic Four: World's Greatest Heroes, voiced by Terry Klassen.
- Impossible Man appears in The Super Hero Squad Show, voiced again by Jess Harnell.
- Impossible Man appears in Avengers Assemble, voiced by Tom Kenny. This version possesses expanded transformation abilities that enable him to summon other entities and objects at will.
- Impossible Man appears in the Hulk and the Agents of S.M.A.S.H. episode "Mission Impossible Man", voiced again by Tom Kenny. This version possesses expanded transformation abilities that enable him to teleport.

=== Video games ===
- Impossible Man appears as a mini-boss in Super Hero Squad Online.
