= Puppet Master (Marvel Comics) =

Marvel Comics fictional character

- Puppet Master taken from a pin-up from Fantastic Four Annual #1 (September 1963); Art by Jack Kirby.

Publication information
- Publisher: Marvel Comics
- First appearance: Fantastic Four #8 (November 1962)
- Created by: Stan Lee (writer); Jack Kirby (artist)

In-story information
- Full name: Philip Masters
- Species: Human
- Partnerships: Mad Thinker; Alicia Masters; Warlord Krang; Wizard; Doctor Doom; Egghead
- Notable aliases: H. Duety
- Abilities: (Currently): Genius-level intellect; Expert biologist; Talented craftsman; Motor-skill manipulation via psychic clay; (Formerly): Shapeshifting; Self-replication; Hive mind

The Puppet Master (Philip Masters) is a supervillain appearing in American comic books published by Marvel Comics. The character was created by Stan Lee and Jack Kirby.

As his name suggests, the Puppet Master uses "radioactive clay" to make puppets in the likenesses of real people, allowing him to control and manipulate them. Presumably, he has some sort of psionic ability that enables him to do this. He has a deep hatred of the Thing, who is romantically interested and married to his stepdaughter, Alicia Masters. He once tried to take over the world but was thwarted in this effort by the Fantastic Four.

== Publication history ==
The Puppet Master's first appearance was in Fantastic Four #8 (November 1962), and he was created by Stan Lee and Jack Kirby. His last name, Masters, was revealed in the letters page of Fantastic Four #42 (September 1965), as suggested by a reader, who was given a No-Prize for her service to Marvel. The Puppet Master's origin is told in Marvel Team-Up #6 (January 1973).

== Fictional character biography ==
Philip Masters, the man who becomes the Puppet Master, was born in Dragorin, a town in the small fictional Balkan nation of Transia. His family immigrated to the United States when he was eight. Growing up, he was socially maladjusted and had no friends. (Note: According to Spider-Man Family #4, his mother died when he was young and he was often picked on, which caused him to turn to his puppets for "friendship".)

After finishing college, Masters went into business with Jacob Reiss. Overcome with jealousy towards his partner's success and happy family life, he attempts to sabotage Reiss' projects, but is caught in the act. A fight breaks out, and Masters causes an explosion that kills Reiss. However, he also unintentionally injures Reiss' young daughter Alicia, leaving her blind. Masters claims that the explosion was accidental and starts a relationship with Reiss' wife, Marcia. He marries Marcia and adopts Alicia, who becomes a sculptor after admiring her stepfather's work. Later, Marcia dies, leaving Masters stricken with grief. Blaming the world for his misfortune, he devises a means of creating puppets of real people and uses them for crime.

When the Human Torch interferes with one of his experiments and gets him arrested and convicted, he sets about bringing down the Fantastic Four. He captures the Invisible Girl and the Thing, and masterminds a mass jailbreak by fashioning a puppet of the warden's trustee. He then falls through a window after tripping over Alicia's hand.

Though the Puppet Master's fatal fall is alluded to in his subsequent appearance, it is never explained how he survived. He has himself committed to a sanitorium for several months in the belief that this will allow the world to forget him. Upon release, he takes control of Namor and uses him to battle the Fantastic Four.

With Doctor Doom, the Puppet Master traps the Fantastic Four within the miniature artificial city of "Liddleville", their minds placed in small, partially mechanical copies of their original bodies. However, Doom perverts what had been intended by the Puppet Master as a chance to give Alicia and Ben a normal life into a trap, and he eventually helps the Fantastic Four learn the truth and escape Liddleville while trapping Doom in the android body he had used to monitor the Fantastic Four. He is defeated by Doom in Liddleville and seems to have been destroyed, but his mind is then resurrected in a body of living radioactive clay. He battles the Thing on the mental plane, and his physical body is destroyed. He is eventually resurrected in his original body by the Sphinx.

The jealous Puppet Master often uses his clay to manipulate the lives of the Fantastic Four, especially where his stepdaughter was concerned. He is particularly concerned with guarding his precious Alicia from marrying the likes of the Thing.

The Puppet Master is outraged when Alicia becomes engaged to Johnny Storm. With the Mad Thinker and the Wizard, Masters attempts to disrupt the wedding of the Human Torch and Alicia. When he sees how happy Alicia is to marry Johnny, Masters is overcome with remorse and turns on his associates, sending Dragon Man to attack them.

Later, Masters is reformed, remarried, and has a stepson; the toys he crafts for his son inadvertently cause a battle between Power Pack and the alien Ciegramites. He reveals to the Thing that the Alicia who married Johnny Storm was Lyja, a Skrull imposter.

The Puppet Master has been shown on two occasions attempting to leave his criminal life behind. In the first, he finds spiritual enlightenment in the service of the billionaire philosopher/cultist Satori. Satori employs Masters to construct a "perfect man" from his clay, which would then receive life and the Power Cosmic from the Silver Surfer and absorb Satori's mind, allowing him to live past his body's death. Masters at some point leaves Satori's cult and enters a S.H.I.E.L.D.-maintained witness protection program, using his abilities to aid the government through the dulling of memories of other so-protected criminals' previous associates.

The Puppet Master returns to crime and affiliates himself with the Mad Thinker. Utilizing a device constructed by Mad Thinker, he controls a large number of civilians, most notably members of the Yancy Street Gang, to escalate a battle between the two different factions in the superhero Civil War.

During the Fear Itself storyline, Puppet Master is seen in a comatose state in the Raft's infirmary. It is revealed that Purple Man had Puppet Master manipulate Misty Knight's Heroes for Hire organization to establish a criminal organization for him while he was in jail. Before Purple Man can kill Puppet Master, Elektra and Shroud arrive and save him.

Later, the Puppet Master is murdered, with all evidence pointing to the Thing as the person responsible. The crime took place in a sealed room with Alicia as the only witness, and she is unable to decipher what has happened. Although the Thing claims innocence, he allows himself to be locked up.

The dead Puppet Master is revealed to be a decoy and the real Puppet Master had been hidden away by the Quiet Man, the mastermind behind Thing's framing and other misfortunes the Fantastic Four had suffered. Mister Fantastic later finds the real Puppet Master captive in the Quiet Man's building.

During the "One World Under Doom" storyline, Ben Grimm visits Puppet Master at the Raft after Doctor Doom restores him to his human form. He provides Puppet Master with some clay as part of an attempt to fix himself. When Alicia Masters confronts him, Puppet Master admits that he has not been a good stepfather to her and gives her the clay puppet of Ben. Later that day, Puppet Master chooses not to escape from prison during a mass breakout.

== Powers and abilities ==
The Puppet Master has no true superpowers, but he does possess a very gifted mind, as well as doctorate in biology, including extensive knowledge of craftsmanship and experimental science. His greatest strength was the skill to create lifelike marionette puppets with extreme speed after Masters molded on those real people. Through intense concentration, Masters is able to control the physical actions of anyone whom that he sculpts from. For how he did this had never adequately explained other than using some type of special neurokinetic clay. The clay he mixed within this solution can be mystical, slightly radioactive, and found in a remote area near Mount Wundagore, site to the prison of an elder god Chthon. He cannot control the actions of essentially mindless creatures or supremely strong-willed beings. His manipulative skills are limited to one person at a time, even by far distance. While in his clay form, he possesses its unique features. Masters could split himself into 1/10 smaller replicas, each with a psychic link and shape-changing capabilities. Fortunately, these abilities were lost, thanks to the Sphinx.

== In other media ==
=== Television ===
- The Puppet Master appears in The Incredible Hulk (1982) episode "Bruce Banner: Unmasked", voiced by Bob Holt.
- The Puppet Master appears in the Fantastic Four (1994) two-part episode "Origin of the Fantastic Four", voiced by Neil Ross. This version despises Alicia Masters, treating her as a burden and a pawn to be used against the Fantastic Four.
- The Puppet Master appears in Fantastic Four: World's Greatest Heroes, voiced by Alvin Sanders. This version is an African-American sculptor whose clay gained mind-controlling properties after being hit by a fragment of the Fantastic Four's space station.

=== Video games ===
The Puppet Master appears in Fantastic Four (2005), voiced by James C. Mathis III. This version is able to bring inanimate objects to life.

== Reception ==
In August 2009, TIME listed the Puppet Master as one of the "Top 10 Oddest Marvel Characters".
