= Beau Weaver =

American actor

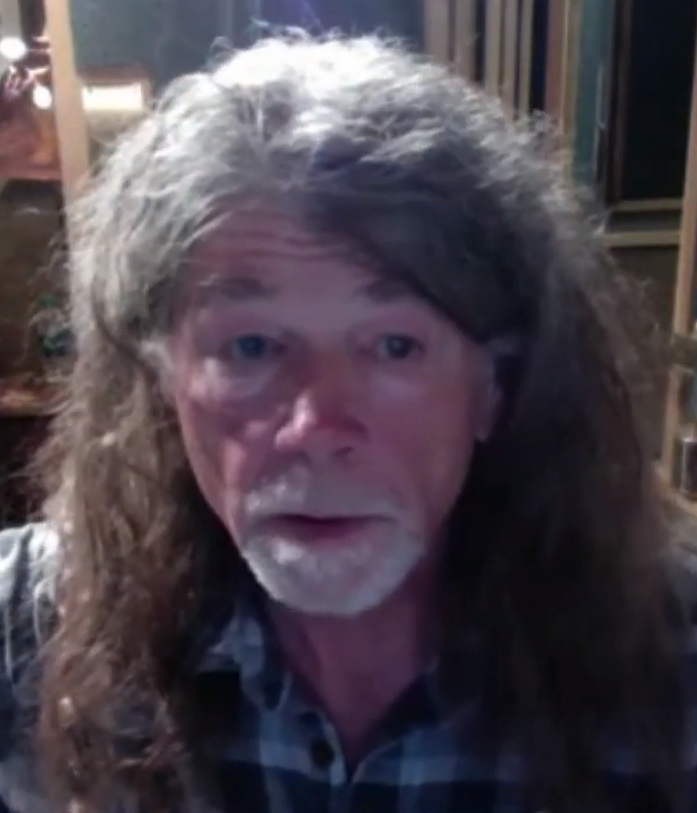
- Weaver in 2020
- Born: January 19, 1952 (age 74); Tulsa, Oklahoma, U.S.
- Occupation: Voice actor
- Years active: 1967–present

Beau Weaver (born January 19, 1952) is an American voice actor in television and film, heard widely in trailers for feature films, network television promos, documentaries, national radio and television commercials and cartoons.

== Career ==
Weaver was born and raised in Tulsa, Oklahoma. He became a disc jockey at age 15 and is sometimes known as Beauregard Rodriquez Weaver.

In the 1970s and 1980s, he was on the air at several pop music stations, including KHJ in Los Angeles, KFRC in San Francisco, KILT in Houston, KCBQ in San Diego, KNUS in Dallas, and KAKC in Tulsa. He was also one of the pioneers of satellite broadcasting as an original member of the air staff of the Transtar Radio Network.

By the 1980s, Weaver had left radio and began working as a freelance voice actor in Los Angeles. He was the announcer on the short-lived game show College Mad House, a spin-off of the kids' game show Fun House. From 1991-1995, Weaver served as announcer on Talk Soup. Weaver later became the announcer of the CBS Domestic Television series The Insider and The Doctors. He is the narrator on Animal Planet's documentary series Weird, True and Freaky, National Geographic's Known Universe, and American Loggers and Heartland Thunder on the Discovery Channel. Weaver narrated trailers for the films Into the Wild (2007) and Revolutionary Road (2008).

Weaver has done work with Disney, promoting their video releases in the late 1990s working alongside fellow Disney voice-overs Mark Elliott and Brian Cummings. Weaver had voice over on Jim Henson video promos in 1993,

Weaver did the voice overs in Walt Disney Company intros, and Walt Disney Masterpiece Collection Logo with Feature Presentation voiceover.

Weaver's television roles include Superman in the 1989 Ruby-Spears production of Superman, a revival of the series timed to coincide with the fiftieth anniversary of the creation of the character. He later voiced Mister Fantastic in Marvel's Fantastic Four animated series, a role he reprised in the 1996 series The Incredible Hulk. Weaver was also the announcer of the video newsmagazine Real TV from 1996–1999 and again from 2000–2001.

== Filmography ==
=== Animation ===
- Bonkers - Jingle
- Duckman - God
- Fantastic Four - Mister Fantastic
- Future-Worm - Movie Narrator (Episode "Lobster Boy Movie Trailer")
- Superman - Superman
- Teenage Mutant Ninja Turtles - Additional voices
- The Flintstone Kids - Additional voices
- The Incredible Hulk - Mister Fantastic
- Mighty Mouse: The New Adventures - Fractured Narrator, additional voices
- The Transformers - Octane
- Visionaries: Knights of the Magical Light - Feryl

=== Live-action ===
- The Weird Al Show - Channel Hopping Announcer
- Most Daring - Narrator (Episodes 1-6)

=== Film ===
- Little Nemo: Adventures in Slumberland - Teacher, Cop
- Rockin' with Judy Jetson - Ramm, Dee-Jay
- The Substitute - Janus Showreel Narrator

=== Video games ===
- Marvel: Ultimate Alliance - Tiger Shark
- Fallout: New Vegas (Old World Blues DLC) - Dr. Borous, Book Chute
