= Fantastic Four (1994 TV series) =

1994 animated television series

- Genre: Superhero
- Based on: Fantastic Four by: Stan Lee; Jack Kirby
- Written by: Ron Friedman; Glenn Leopold
- Voices of: Beau Weaver; Lori Alan; Quinton Flynn; Chuck McCann; Stan Lee; Brian Austin Green; Simon Templeman
- Composers: Giorgio Moroder; (season 1); William Kevin Anderson; (season 2)
- Country of origin: United States
- Original language: English
- No. of seasons: 2
- No. of episodes: 26

Production
- Executive producers: Stan Lee; Rick Ungar (season 2)
- Producers: Glen Hall (season 1); Larry Houston (season 2)
- Running time: 22 minutes
- Production companies: Wang Film Productions (1994–1995) (season 1); Philippine Animation Studio (1995–1996) (season 2); Marvel Entertainment Group Marvel Films

Original release
- Network: Syndication (The Marvel Action Hour/Marvel Action Universe)
- Release: September 24, 1994 – February 24, 1996

Related
- The New Fantastic Four; Fantastic Four: World's Greatest Heroes

Fantastic Four, also known as Fantastic Four: The Animated Series, is the third animated television series based on Marvel's comic book series of the same name. Airing began on September 24, 1994, until ending on February 24, 1996. The series ran for two seasons, with 13 episodes per season, making 26 episodes in total.

== Overview ==
In the early-to-mid-1990s, Genesis Entertainment and New World Entertainment syndicated a new Fantastic Four animated series as part of the Marvel Action Hour weekend block, later renamed Marvel Action Universe (second use of the name), with the addition of another show. The first half of the hour was an episode of Iron Man; the second half an episode of Fantastic Four. During the first season, Stan Lee was featured speaking before each show about characters in the following episode and what had inspired him to create them.

The show has also aired on Fox Kids, and Disney XD in the United States.

=== Season 1 ===
Most episodes in the first season consisted of fairly accurate re-interpretations of classic 1960s Fantastic Four comic book stories by Stan Lee and Jack Kirby. For instance, this series stayed true to the original comic book story that recounted the Silver Surfer and Galactus' coming to Earth in a two-part episode as well as Doctor Doom's theft of the Surfer's powers. However, the season's cost-effective animation (provided by Wang Film Productions and Kennedy Cartoons) and attempts to add humor through the inclusion of a fussy British landlady (voiced by Lee's wife Joan) for the Fantastic Four were generally met with displeasure by fans. Tom DeFalco, who wrote the Fantastic Four comic book series, got in trouble for penning a scene in issue #396 of the series that featured Ant-Man watching and lambasting an episode of the series.

The first season was also the only season to use digital ink and paint in some episodes.

In the two-part premiere "The Origin of the Fantastic Four", Puppet Master took control of the Thing and used him to capture Invisible Woman. Mister Fantastic freed the Thing from his control and defeated the Puppet Master. Upon returning to his apartment to reclaim his final doll, he ended up in a fight with Alicia Masters, and then he apparently fell to his death from the apartment window. The Fantastic Four are not able to find the Puppet Master and claim that he "vanished from Earth."

In "The Silver Surfer & the Coming of Galactus", the Silver Surfer, Firelord, and Terrax fight the Fantastic Four while Galactus attempts to feed on Earth. By the second season, all but the presence of Silver Surfer in that battle is ignored as Terrax is seen again and referred to as being the replacement for the Silver Surfer. In the episode "When Calls Galactus", Terrax is turned into a worm and Nova (Frankie Raye) becomes the new herald of Galactus.

In the three-part special episode, "Mask of Doom", Doctor Doom captures the Fantastic Four and forces Mister Fantastic, Human Torch, and the Thing to go back in time and obtain an object for him. In the aforementioned episode "Silver Surfer and the Return of Galactus", Doom steals the Silver Surfer's powers and tries to steal Galactus' powers, only to be thwarted by Galactus himself.

=== Season 2 ===
Both New World and Marvel Productions had been unhappy with the first seasons of Fantastic Four and Iron Man which lead to Tom Tataranowicz being hired as the new supervising producer for both series. Tataranowicz and his team had recently completed 65 episodes of New World's Biker Mice from Mars which impressed Marvel in terms of its creativity and quality and was a deciding factor in assigning him to the series. In terms of his responsibilities on the series, Tataranowicz stated:

My official job title was as Supervising Producer. That meant that I was the one responsible for the re-vamp of the total look of the series, putting together what I wanted to be the season's stories and arcs for approval, selecting the crew, functioning as Voice Director and Supervising Story Editor, and overseeing and finalizing all of the scripts. I also supervised the Post Production among myriad other duties such as working with the Overseas studio, etc.

Fantastic Four and Iron Man were radically retooled for their second seasons, sporting brand-new opening sequences, improved animation (as previously mentioned, the animation for the first season thirteen episodes was done by Wang Film Productions and Kennedy Cartoons, while the second season's animation was provided by the Philippine Animation Studio), and more mature writing (the first season was primarily written by Ron Friedman, while the second season was overseen by Tom Tataranowicz), though noticeably having fewer introductions by Stan Lee, with several of the new shorter intros being used more than once. In addition, Four Freedoms Plaza replaced the Baxter Building as the Fantastic Four's home base in season 2. The season 2 episodes also drew upon John Byrne’s 1980s run on the Fantastic Four comic (as well as John Buscema's artwork), in addition to further Lee and Kirby adventures.

In the second season's premiere episode "And a Blind Man Shall Lead Them" (guest starring Daredevil), Doctor Doom strikes at a now fully powerless Fantastic Four and has his hand crushed by the Thing. Doom next appears in "Nightmare in Green", where he directs Hulk to attack the team.

Wizard appears in the episode "And the Wind Cries Medusa" (the first part of the three-part Inhumans Saga). In his debut appearance, he assembles Medusa, Hydro-Man, and Trapster to form the Frightful Four. On a related note, this episode aired one week from Hydro-Man's debut appearance in Spider-Man. Wizard also used a device to control the Thing. Meanwhile, Crystal (Medusa's sister), along with the other Inhumans: Black Bolt (Medusa's husband), Gorgon, Triton, Karnak, and Lockjaw, also make their debut in the three-part "Inhumans Saga" episode, who try to find Medusa. Crystal goes on to become the girlfriend of the Human Torch. Seeker appears in the episode "Inhumans Saga: Beware the Hidden Land". He is sent by Maximus (Black Bolt's brother), to retrieve the Inhuman Royal Family, after he had usurped the throne and also caused Medusa's amnesia. After saving the Fantastic Four from the explosion, Seeker briefly shares the history of the Inhumans to them. After the Fantastic Four and the Inhumans teamed up to overthrow Maximus, he trapped the Inhumans in the Great Refuge (Attilan) in an impenetrable dome.

Susan Richards as Malice appears in the episode "Worlds Within Worlds". Malice's appearance is the result of Psycho-Man using his empathic abilities to make Susan turn against her Fantastic Four teammates. Eventually, Susan is freed of Psycho-Man's influence and defeats him.

The Black Panther appears in the "Prey of the Black Panther". He lures the Fantastic Four to Wakanda to see if they are worthy enough to help fight Klaw. As in the comics, Klaw's history of killing T'Chaka is included as well as T'Challa using Klaw's own weapon on his right hand.

In "To Battle the Living Planet," the Fantastic Four ask Galactus' help in confronting Ego the Living Planet. Thor meanwhile guest stars in two episodes. In "To Battle the Living Planet," the Fantastic Four help him fight Ego the Living Planet even when they enlist Galactus' help. In "When Calls Galactus," he and Ghost Rider both help the Fantastic Four fight Galactus. Also in "When Calls Galactus", Nova volunteers to replace Terrax as Galactus' herald. As in the comics, Frankie Raye ends up getting her powers when she is accidentally doused in the chemicals that gave the android Human Torch his powers.

Franklin Storm appears in the episode "Behold, A Distant Star". Just like in the comics, Franklin Storm lost his wife in an accident, and an altercation with a loan shark led to an accidental murder. When Invisible Woman has shrapnel in the lower part of her brain after a recent Skrull attack (Lyja is shown as a commander to the Skrull army), he has to come out of hiding to perform the surgery. He turns himself over to the arriving police. After being freed from his volcanic prison, Super-Skrull replaces him in prison and takes on the guise of the Invincible Man, who breaks out of prison, goes on a rampage on the city, and runs afoul of the Fantastic Four. They soon realize that Franklin Storm is Super-Skrull in disguise. Warlord Morrat has a concussive energy beam projector attached to Storm's chest. The projector is set to go off the moment he sees the Fantastic Four. When Storm appears, he warns the Fantastic Four to stay away and rolls over on the floor, taking the full force of the blast and dying.

In "Hopelessly Impossible", Lockjaw helps the Human Torch get the Impossible Man to the Great Refuge and away from the Super-Skrull. In "The Sentry Sinister", the Fantastic Four takes a vacation on a dangerous island, upon the awakening of a Kree Sentry. Meanwhile, still trapped in the impenetrable dome, Black Bolt destroys Attilan to free the Inhumans. Crystal eventually reunites with the Human Torch and joins the Fantastic Four.

In the series finale, "Doomsday", Doctor Doom acquires the Power Cosmic from the Silver Surfer. The Fantastic Four and the rest of the superheroes must find a way to stop him. He once again tries to go after Galactus, only to hit the barrier that prevents the Silver Surfer from leaving Earth.

==== The Incredible Hulk crossover ====
Simon Templeman reprised his role of Doctor Doom for guest appearances in two episodes, in which Doom holds Washington, D.C. captive, only to be defeated by She-Hulk, whom he later attempts to take revenge upon. With his appearance on this series, it can be assumed that Doom survived the fate he met on the Fantastic Four series, if both series are to be considered within the same continuity.

Following Doctor Doom's first appearance (he appears again in the second-season episode "Hollywood Rocks"), comes the episode "Fantastic Fortitude" featuring his nemesis, the Fantastic Four. The episode seems to place this series in the same continuity with Fantastic Four, as this episode plays off the Hulk's appearance in the other series. Beau Weaver (Reed Richards/Mister Fantastic) and Chuck McCann (Ben Grimm/The Thing) reprise their roles from the Fantastic Four series. In the episode, Mister Fantastic and the other Fantastic Four take their vacation prior to Hulk, She-Hulk, and Thing fighting Leader's Gamma Soldiers. Meanwhile, She-Hulk flirts with Thing, but Ben chooses to rekindle his relationship with Alicia Masters. While the Yancy Street Gang never appear in the Fantastic Four series itself, they appear in "Fantastic Fortitude", where they pull a prank on the Thing. After he is defeated by the villain Ogress, the Gang distributes leaflets marked "THING WHUPPED BY A WOMAN!", much to his chagrin.

=== Proposed season 3 ===
According to season 2 supervising producer Tom Tataranowicz, had there had been a third season of Fantastic Four, he would have wanted to go into the Sue Storm pregnancy story arc. In Tataranowicz's eyes, this would have given the production crew a chance to do their own take on the Sub-Mariner (who only appeared in season 1), as he played into the arc in Fantastic Four issues leading up to and around issue #100. Tataranowicz also wanted to bring Medusa and She-Hulk into the mix as part of the Fantastic Four.

== Cast ==
=== Main ===
- Beau Weaver – Reed Richards / Mister Fantastic, Trapster, Admiral Koh, T'Chaka
- Lori Alan – Susan Storm-Richards / Invisible Woman
- Brian Austin Green – Johnny Storm / Human Torch (season 1)
- Quinton Flynn – Johnny Storm / Human Torch (season 2)
- Chuck McCann – Benjamin "Ben" Jacob Grimm / The Thing
- John Vernon - Doctor Doom (season 1)
- Neil Ross – Puppet Master, Warlord Krang, Super-Skrull (season 1)
- Simon Templeman – Doctor Doom (season 2)
- Pauline Lomas – Alicia Masters

=== Guest cast ===
- Edward Albert – Norrin Radd / Silver Surfer (season 2)
- Gregg Berger – Mole Man
- Mary Kay Bergman – Anelle
- Jane Carr – Lady Dorma
- Rocky Carroll – Triton (first voice, season 2)
- Dick Clark – Himself
- Jim Cummings – Slash Curtis, Bull Donovan, Skink Lomas, Bill Clinton, Votan
- Keith David – Black Panther
- Michael Dorn – Gorgon (season 2)
- Ron Feinberg – Terrax (season 2)
- Ron Friedman – Blastaar
- Brad Garrett – Hydro-Man
- George Gee – Himself
- Dan Gilvezan – Warlord Morrat
- Benny Grant – Rick Jones
- Richard Grieco – Ghost Rider
- Mark Hamill – Kree Sentry, Maximus, Triton (second voice)
- Jess Harnell – Impossible Man, Super-Skrull (season 2)
- Jamie Horton – Psycho-Man (season 2)
- Charles Howerton – Klaw
- Kathy Ireland – Crystal (season 2)
- Tony Jay – Galactus, Terrax (season 1)
- Green Jellÿ – Themselves
- Clyde Kusatsu – Annihilus, Karnak
- Kay E. Kuter – Ego the Living Planet
- Joan Lee – Lavinia Forbes
- Stan Lee – Himself
- Kerrigan Mahan – Seeker (season 2)
- Leeza McGee – Nova
- Richard McGonagle – Franklin Storm (season 2)
- Katherine Moffat – Commander Lyja
- Iona Morris – Medusa (season 2)
- Alan Oppenheimer – Firelord, Uatu the Watcher
- Gary Owens – Himself
- Ron Perlman – Bruce Banner / Hulk, Wizard
- Riff Regan – Melinda
- John Rhys-Davies – Thor
- Robert Ridgely – Skrull Emperor
- Robin Sachs – Norrin Radd / Silver Surfer (season 1)
- Bill Smitrovich – Daredevil
- Gina Tuttle – Female TV Reporter
- James Warwick – Namor, Sam Jaggers

== Episodes ==
=== Season 1 (1994) ===
No.	Title	Written by	Original release date	Prod. code
1	"The Origin of the Fantastic Four"	Ron Friedman	September 24, 1994	101
2	"The Origin of the Fantastic Four"	Ron Friedman	October 1, 1994	102
Notes: Based on Fantastic Four #1 and #8.
3	"Now Comes the Sub-Mariner"	Ron Friedman	October 8, 1994	103
Notes: Based on Fantastic Four #4.
4	"Incursion of the Skrulls"	Ron Friedman	October 15, 1994	104
Notes: Based on Fantastic Four #2.
5	"The Silver Surfer and the Coming of Galactus"	Ron Friedman	October 22, 1994	105
6	"The Silver Surfer and the Coming of Galactus"	Ron Friedman	October 29, 1994	106
Notes: Based on Fantastic Four #48–50.
7	"Super Skrull"	Ron Friedman	November 5, 1994	107
Notes: Based on Fantastic Four #18.
8	"The Mask of Doom, Part I"	Elwin Ransom & Ron Friedman	November 12, 1994	108
Notes: Based on Fantastic Four #5.
9	"The Mask of Doom, Part II"	Elwin Ransom & Ron Friedman	November 19, 1994	109
Notes: Based on Fantastic Four #5 and Annual #2.
10	"The Mask of Doom, Part III"	Elwin Ransom & Ron Friedman	November 26, 1994	110
Notes: Based on Fantastic Four #5.
11	"Mole Man"	Ron Friedman	December 3, 1994	111
Notes: Based on Fantastic Four #1.
12	"Behold the Negative Zone"	Ron Friedman	December 10, 1994	112
Notes: Based on Fantastic Four Annual #6 and Fantastic Four #62. Chronologically, this is the last episode of the first season.
13	"The Silver Surfer and the Return of Galactus"	Ron Friedman	December 17, 1994	113
Notes: Based on Fantastic Four #57–60. Although it aired as the season finale, this episode takes place before "Mole Man."

=== Season 2 (1995–1996) ===
No.	Title	Directed by	Written by	Original release date	Prod. code
14	"And a Blind Man Shall Lead Them"	Thomas Mclaughlin Jr.	Steve Granat & Cydne Clark	September 23, 1995	201
Notes: Based on Fantastic Four #39–40.
15	"Inhumans Saga, Part 1: And the Wind Cries Medusa"	Ernesto Lopez, Graham Morris & Tom Tatatanowicz	Glenn Leopold	September 30, 1995	202
Notes: Based on Fantastic Four #36 and #41–47.
16	"Inhumans Saga, Part 2: The Inhumans Among Us"	Ernesto Lopez, Graham Morris & Tom Tatatanowicz	Glenn Leopold	October 7, 1995	203
Notes: Based on Fantastic Four #36 and #41–47.
17	"Inhumans Saga, Part 3: Beware the Hidden Land"	Ernesto Lopez, Graham Morris & Tom Tatatanowicz	Glenn Leopold	October 14, 1995	204
Notes: Based on Fantastic Four #36 and #41–47.
18	"Worlds Within Worlds"	Myrna Bushman	David Ehrman; Story by : Steve Granat & Cydne Clark	October 21, 1995	205
Notes: Based on Fantastic Four #76–77 and #280–283.
19	"To Battle the Living Planet"	Ernesto Lopez	Jan Strnad; Story by : Steve Granat & Cydne Clark	November 4, 1995	206
Notes: Based on Fantastic Four #234–235.
20	"Prey of the Black Panther"	Thomas Mclaughlin Jr.	Glenn Leopold	November 11, 1995	207
Notes: Based on Fantastic Four #52–53.
21	"When Calls Galactus"	Richard Trueblood	Jan Strnad	November 18, 1995	208
Notes: Based on Fantastic Four #242–244.
22	"Nightmare in Green"	Thomas Mclaughlin Jr.	Glenn Leopold	November 25, 1995	209
Notes: Based on Fantastic Four #12.
23	"Behold, a Distant Star"	Ernesto Lopez	Steve Granat & Cydne Clark	February 3, 1996	210
Notes: Based on Fantastic Four #32 and #37.
24	"Hopelessly Impossible"	Thomas Mclaughlin Jr.	Greg Johnson	February 10, 1996	211
Notes: Based on Fantastic Four #11.
25	"The Sentry Sinister"	Ernesto Lopez	Glenn Leopold	February 17, 1996	212
Notes: Based on Fantastic Four #64.
26	"Doomsday"	Thomas Mclaughlin Jr.	Cydne Clark	February 24, 1996	213
Notes: Based on Fantastic Four #57–60.

== Crossovers ==
=== The Incredible Hulk ===
Chuck McCann and Beau Weaver reprised their roles as the Thing and Mister Fantastic respectively on The Incredible Hulk.

No.	Title	Written by	Original release date
8	"Fantastic Fortitude"	Bob Forward	November 10, 1996

=== Spider-Man ===
Only Quinton Flynn (who replaced Brian Austin Green as the voice of the Human Torch in the second season) came back for Spider-Man. Beau Weaver, Lori Alan, and Chuck McCann were replaced by Cam Clarke, Gail Matthius, and Patrick Pinney as Mister Fantastic, the Invisible Woman, and the Thing respectively, and Doctor Doom was voiced by veteran voice actor Tom Kane for parts 2 and 3.

No.	Title	Written by	Original release date
61	"Secret Wars"	John Semper, Karen Milovich	November 7, 1997
63	"Secret Wars"	John Semper, Mark Hoffmeier, and Ernie Altbacker	November 21, 1997

== Broadcast and release ==
Despite the fact that the show ended in 1996, the success of the live-action Fantastic Four film have sparked more interest in new fans, allowing the series to air in reruns on Jetix block on Toon Disney due to its new owners: The Walt Disney Company.

In February 2012, Marvel.com uploaded every episode for streaming purposes, although they have now been removed.

The entire series is available to purchase on the iTunes Store, Amazon Prime Video, and Google TV.

The series with both seasons combined into one complete season has been shown on Disney's streaming service Disney+ since its launch on November 12, 2019, however, the episode "Incursion of the Skrulls" is omitted, most likely due to the destruction of the Twin Towers during the episode.

== Home media ==
=== VHS ===
During the series' run, some episodes were released on VHS. These were from 20th Century Fox Home Entertainment.

VHS name	Episode titles	Release date	Publisher	Stock number	Notes
The Origin of the Fantastic Four	"The Origin of the Fantastic Four" Parts 1 & 2	July 2, 1997	20th Century Fox Home Entertainment	4193	

In the late 1990s, another selection of VHS compilations were released by Marvel Films/New World Entertainment (these tapes were distributed in Canada by Telegenic Entertainment). These releases featured episodes edited into 40 minute movies based on the particular story arc.

VHS name	Episode titles	Release date	Publisher	Stock number	Notes
The Origin	"The Origin of the Fantastic Four" Parts 1 & 2	May 19, 1998	Marvel Films/New World Entertainment	03033	This Tape Is In SP Mode.

=== DVD ===
==== Region 1 ====
The cover for the DVD release.

On July 5, 2005, Buena Vista Home Entertainment released the complete series on a 4-disc Region 1 DVD boxset. This set was created to cash-in on the release of the live-action film which was released theatrically a few days later. It features new introductions by Stan Lee for all 26 episodes (replacing the original introductions, which had been removed for network broadcast) as well as an interview where Stan Lee talks about how he created the Fantastic Four. Additionally, pieces of footage from the episodes themselves had also been removed for network broadcast, and it is these cut episodes that comprise the DVD set.

Before the release of the boxset, the first episode of season two - "And a Blind Man Shall Lead Them" appeared on the DVD release of Daredevil vs. Spider-Man as a bonus feature.

==== Region 2 ====
In July 2005, Buena Vista Home Entertainment released a Region 2 single-release DVD titled Fantastic Four: A Legend Begins. It comprises the first two episodes and the trilogy of the first appearance of Doctor Doom, and includes the same bonus features as the US boxset.

In April 2008, Liberation Entertainment secured the home media rights to select Marvel shows from Jetix Europe in select European territories. The company were due to release both seasons in the United Kingdom, but the company shuttered their UK operations on October 22, 2008. Lace International released their remaining stock, including both seasons of the show and a boxset containing all twenty-six episodes in November 2008, with remastered video and audio footage. In April 2009, Liberation released the Seasons 1 and 2 boxset in some European countries with Dutch subtitles.

Clear Vision later took over UK and German distribution rights, re-releasing the season volumes as separate sets. Season 1 was released on May 4, 2009 and May 13, 2009, while Season 2 was released on June 10, 2009 and June 17, 2009.

== Comics ==
An 8 issues comic-book series based on the show was published by Marvel:

- Marvel Action Hour: Fantastic Four (November 1994 to June 1995)

== Merchandising ==
An action figure line based on the TV show was produced by Toy Biz, and ran for four series. The line included the main characters and many of the various guest-stars, as well as characters that never even appeared on the show, such as Dragon Man and Thanos.
