= Martha's Vineyard Mysteries =

Martha Vineyards Mysteries

Martha's Vineyard Mysteries is a television film series which airs on Hallmark Movies & Mysteries channel.

The films star Jesse Metcalfe and Sarah Lind and are filmed in the US and Canada. They are based on the novels by Philip R. Craig and the first aired in 2020. The author's son, a sergeant in the Edgartown Police Department, helps the production team ensure the stories are as realistic as possible.

== Series overview ==
The series centers around a retired Boston detective (Metcalfe) when he returns to his hometown in Massachusetts and becomes involved in various criminal investigations, and his relationship with the local doctor and medical examiner (Lind). There is a recurring subplot around the circumstances of Jackson's retirement from Boston after being shot and injured while working a case with his partner.

== Cast and characters ==
- Jesse Metcalfe is Jeff Jackson, a medically retired Boston Police Department detective
- Sarah Lind is Zee Madieras, a doctor and medical examiner
- Eric Keenleyside is Chief Madieras, the chief of police, and Zee's father
- Chelsea Hobbs is Jackie Shawl, a local reporter
- Sunita Prasad is Britt Prajna, a local hotel manager and Zee's best friend

== List of films ==
No.	Title	Directed by	Written by	Original release date
1	"A Beautiful Place to Die: A Martha's Vineyard Mystery"	Mark Jean	Kraig Wenman, Teena Booth	January 12, 2020
A retired Boston PD detective and the acting medical examiner at Martha's Vineyard work together to solve the murder of a mysterious young man.
2	"Riddled with Deceit: A Martha's Vineyard Mystery"	Andy Mikita	Michael Vickerman, John Christian Plummer	February 23, 2020
Former detective Jeff Jackson teams up with Dr. Zee Madieras to track down their friend's missing emerald brooch, a thief, and also - a murderer.
3	"Ships in the Night: A Martha's Vineyard Mystery"	Mark Jean	Gillian Horvath	January 17, 2021
When an art gallery robbery leads to the death of the contemptible gallery manager, former Boston detective Jeff Jackson teams up with local doctor - and old flame - Dr. Zee Madeiras, to catch the killer.
4	"Poisoned in Paradise: A Martha's Vineyard Mystery"	Mark Jean	Jim Adler	May 16, 2021
When a local waitress is found dead on the beach and a mysterious deposit appears in Zee's bank account, Martha's Vineyard proves to be all but the simple, scenic life Jeff Jackson was after.
