= Alicia Masters =

Marvel Comics character

Alicia Grimm
- Alicia Masters, art by Jack Kirby.

Publication information
- Publisher: Marvel Comics
- First appearance: The Fantastic Four #8 (November 1962)
- Created by: Stan Lee (writer); Jack Kirby (artist)

In-story information
- Full name: Alicia Grimm (formerly Masters, née Reiss)
- Species: Human
- Supporting character of: Future Foundation; Fantastic Four
- Notable aliases: Alicia Clay
- Abilities: Talented sculptor

Alicia Grimm (born Alicia Reiss, later known as Alicia Masters) (Note: The character was born to Jacob Reiss and Marcia Deaton, with Marcia marrying Philip Masters (Puppet Master) after Jacob's death. Alicia later took the name of her husband, Ben Grimm.) is a character appearing in American comic books published by Marvel Comics. Created by writer Stan Lee and artist Jack Kirby, she first appeared in The Fantastic Four #8 (November 1962). She is a supporting character to the superheroes the Fantastic Four and Silver Surfer.

Alicia Masters is a blind sculptor. She is able to create incredibly lifelike representations of real people by touch and memory alone; her sculptures of the Fantastic Four and other superheroes are frequently depicted. A caring, sensitive character, she has been a romantic interest, confidante, and eventual wife of The Thing, a member of the Fantastic Four who is frequently ashamed of his monstrous appearance. She has also helped explain human life and emotion to the alien Silver Surfer.

Actress Kat Green played her in the unreleased The Fantastic Four film from 1994, and then Kerry Washington portrayed her in the 2005 film Fantastic Four and the 2007 sequel Fantastic Four: Rise of the Silver Surfer.

== Publication history ==
Alicia Masters debuted in The Fantastic Four #8 (November 1962), created by Stan Lee and Jack Kirby. She appeared in the 1987 Silver Surfer series, the 2018 Fantastic Four: Wedding Special #1 one-shot, and the 2023 Fantastic Four series.

== Fictional character biography ==
Alicia Masters is introduced in Fantastic Four #8, along with her stepfather, the supervillain known as the Puppet Master. Alicia was not initially given a surname; she was given the last name "Masters" by a reader, as announced in Fantastic Four #42 (Sept. 1965); the reader was given a No-Prize for her service to Marvel. Alicia initially aids the Puppet Master out of obedience in his first scheme against the Fantastic Four, though she immediately senses the "gentle" and "sensitive" spirit of the Thing when she first feels his palpably monstrous face. Alicia turns on her stepfather when she realizes that he is mad and power-hungry, and accidentally causes him to fall to his apparent death out of a window. A subsequently published story explains that the Puppet Master had been responsible for her permanent blindness, which was caused by an explosion of radioactive clay during a fight with his partner and Alicia's father, Jacob Reiss. Masters married Reiss' widow Marcia, adopting Alicia and becoming her sole caretaker after her mother's death.

Alicia Masters pleads with the Silver Surfer for the survival of humanity in Fantastic Four #49 (April 1966). Art by Jack Kirby.

Alicia Masters was a recurring character in early issues of Fantastic Four as the love interest of the Thing, serving as a plot device to cause him to resist changing back to a normal human form, for fear that Alicia would not love him. The physically vulnerable Masters was also frequently used as a damsel in distress.

The character plays an integral role in the story arc "The Coming of Galactus", in Fantastic Four #48–50 (March–May 1966). The Silver Surfer comes to Earth as a herald to the powerful, world-destroying being Galactus, and crashes into Alicia's apartment after fighting the Fantastic Four. Her pleading with him about the value of life convinces him to reject his master and defend Earth.

After the Thing chooses to remain on an alien planet where he could change back to human form, Alicia falls in love with the dashing Human Torch, another member of the Fantastic Four. The Thing returns to unhappily attend their wedding. In Fantastic Four #300, Johnny Storm and Alicia marry, but the ceremony is nearly foiled by the Mad Thinker, the Wizard, and Alicia's stepfather, the Puppet Master. These three villains planned to attack the wedding, but at the last moment Puppet Master stopped them, with the (unwilling) help of Dragon Man.

After several months, the Fantastic Four discovers that Alicia was kidnapped and replaced by Lyja, a Skrull espionage agent sent to infiltrate the Fantastic Four and set them up for her handler, Paibok, to destroy them. The Fantastic Four defeats Paibok and retrieves Alicia. She was taken before Ben broke up with her, and her feelings for Ben never changed. This makes things difficult for both him and Johnny. The two of them had months to resolve things between them. Now Johnny has to come to grips with the fact that the real Alicia never loved him and that Lyja is the woman he loves. Ben has to deal with having gotten over Alicia, only to have her back and in love with him.

The press is told that Alicia and Johnny divorced. With her relationships with Ben and Johnny now complicated by Johnny's marriage to 'Lyja' and Ben's prior attempts to resolve his old feelings for her after Lyja's marriage, Alicia subsequently becomes romantically involved with the Silver Surfer and eventually leaves Earth with him, traveling through outer space at his side in an armored suit.

Alicia is frequently trusted as a babysitter for Franklin Richards, the son of Invisible Woman and Mr. Fantastic. During the year-long period in which the FF were missing ("Heroes Reborn"), Alicia is seen as his primary caretaker.

After the Fantastic Four disband following the collapse of the multiverse, Peter Parker purchases the Baxter Building to keep it safe until the team are ready to come back together. Ben initially spends time with the Guardians of the Galaxy, but eventually, after a failed attempt to find the Richards family, he proposes to Alicia just before the Richards return to Earth.

In the aftermath of the 2020 crossover "Empyre", Ben and Alicia adopt two orphans, the Kree boy Jo-Venn and the Skrull girl N'Kala.

== Skills and abilities ==
Alicia Masters possesses no superpowers. She is naturally empathetic and compassionate, with expertise in sculpting. Her cane is also designed to be used as a double baton for self-defense.

== Reception ==
Kai Young of Screen Rant stated the empathy Alicia Masters demonstrates makes the character a "gentle presence" among the Fantastic Four and complimented her relationship with Ben Grimm. David Harth of Comic Book Resources praised how Alicia Masters overlooks Ben Grimm's appearance and values his true nature, calling their relationship a "huge moment for every fan".

== Other versions ==
=== Earth X ===
In the alternate future of the 1999 miniseries Earth X, Alicia has married Ben Grimm. They have two children, Buzz and Chuck, who have Ben's orange-rock skin. Like most of humanity, Alicia has been granted powers due to the release of a mutative agent.

=== House of M ===
In the 2005 storyline "House of M", Alicia is part of the human resistance, struggling against the ruling class of mutants. She has spent some time as a sculptor; J. Jonah Jameson had commissioned one of himself for his home.

=== Fantastic Four: The End ===
In the 2007 miniseries Fantastic Four: The End, which depicts a possible future of the Fantastic Four, Alicia is married to Ben Grimm and they have three children and live on Mars, where she uses her sculpture talents for terraforming.

=== Ultimate Marvel ===
The Ultimate Marvel version of the character is introduced into the modern revamp of the Fantastic Four, Ultimate Fantastic Four, in issue #29, where she is a sculpture student at an arts college. She finds a depressed Ben in the park; her simple gesture of friendship instantly places her in mortal danger from Doctor Doom.

== In other media ==
=== Television ===
Alicia Masters and the Silver Surfer as depicted in Fantastic Four (1994).

- Alicia Masters appears in The Incredible Hulk (1982) episode "Bruce Banner Unmasked", voiced by B. J. Ward.
- Alicia Masters appears in Fantastic Four (1994), voiced by Pauline Lomas.
- Alicia Masters appears in Fantastic Four: World's Greatest Heroes, voiced by Sunita Prasad. This version is African-American.
- Alicia Masters appears in The Super Hero Squad Show episode "Blind Rage Knows No Color!", voiced by Tara Strong.

=== Film ===
- Alicia Masters appears in The Fantastic Four (1994), portrayed by Kat Green.
- Alicia Masters appears in Fantastic Four (2005), portrayed by Kerry Washington. This version is African-American.
- Alicia Masters appears in Fantastic Four: Rise of the Silver Surfer, portrayed again by Kerry Washington. According to Michael Chiklis, who portrayed the Thing, his relationship with Masters would have received a greater focus in a cancelled third installment.

=== Video games ===
Alicia Masters, based on Kerry Washington's portrayal, appears in the Fantastic Four (2005) tie-in game, voiced by Cree Summer.
