= Sunita Prasad =

Canadian actress

- Occupation: Actress
- Years active: 1997–present

Sunita Prasad is a Canadian actress. She has appeared in television series such as iZombie, Bates Motel and UnREAL and also voiced Alicia Masters in Fantastic Four: World's Greatest Heroes. She has had recurring roles in several Hallmark Movies & Mysteries films, including Picture Perfect Mysteries and Martha's Vineyard Mysteries.

== Filmography ==
=== Film ===
Year	Title	Role	Notes
2008	The Day the Earth Stood Still	Rouhani	
2009	Helen	Psych Nurse #3	
2009	Hardwired	Nurse Price	
2011	Donovan's Echo	Medical Assistant	
2017	Crash Pad	Counter Girl	

=== Television ===
Year	Title	Role	Notes
2005	Da Vinci's Inquest	Police Constable #5	"Before They Twist the Knife"
2005	A Perfect Note	Rupi	TV film
2005	Da Vinci's City Hall	Police Constable #1	"Ready to Call in the Horses"
2005–06	Godiva's	Chandra	Guest role (4 episodes)
2006	Killer Instinct	Alice	"Love Hurts"
2006	Saved	N.I.C.U. Nurse	"A Shock to the System"
2006–07	Fantastic Four: World's Greatest Heroes	Alicia Masters (voice)	
2007	A.M.P.E.D.	Woman Shopper	TV film
2007	Bionic Woman	Nadeem's Girlfriend	"The Education of Jaime Sommers"
2008	Aliens in America	Sadika Sadaqatmal	"One Hundred Thousand Miles", "Raja at Sixteen"
2008	Smallville	Nurse	"Prey"
2009	Fringe	Waitress	"August"
2010	Life Unexpected	Stephanie	"Honeymoon Interrupted"
2012	Eureka	Boxed Hand Tech	"In Too Deep"
2012	Emily Owens, M.D.	Amira Garang	"Emily and... the Predator"
2013	Fatal Performance	Lana	TV film
2014	Almost Human	Janet	"You Are Here"
2014	Bates Motel	Andrea	"The Escape Artist"
2014	Package Deal	Waitress	"How I Met Your Brother", "Storage Lore"
2015	iZombie	Rebecca Hinton	"Maternity Liv", "Mr. Berserk"
2015	Proof	Nurse #3 / Nurse #1	"Redemption", "Tsunami: Part 1"
2015	Once Upon a Holiday	Trish	TV film
2016	UnREAL	London	Guest role (4 episodes)
2017	Imposters	Janet	"My Balls, Dickhead"
2017	The Magicians	Lia	"Cheat Day"
2017	Supernatural	Serena Colman	"The Raid"
2017	Site Unseen: An Emma Fielding Mystery	Jessica	TV film
2017	Somewhere Between	Anya	"For One to Live", "2.0"
2017	Travelers	Blair	"Jacob", "Traveler 0027"
2018-2019	The Good Doctor	Nurse/O.R. Nurse/Surgical Nurse	"Islands: Part 2", "Xin", "First Case, Second Base"
2018	The X-Files	Dr. Aliyeh Scholz	"Ghouli"
2019	The InBetween	Vera Salonga	"Let Me In Your Window"
2019	A Million Little Things	Tammy Blakely	"Austin"
2019	Nancy Drew	Angela Belkin	"The Mark of the Poisoner's Pearl"
2020	The 100	Shoana	"Etherea","The Stranger"
2019-2020	Picture Perfect Mysteries	Maya	"Picture Perfect Mysteries: Newlywed and Dead", " Picture Perfect Mysteries: Dead Over Diamonds", "Exit, Stage Death"
2020	Loudermilk	Attorney	"Hit Me Baby One More Time"
2021	Two Sentence Horror Stories	Anika	"Instinct"
2021	The Stand	Sophia	"The Vigil", "The Stand"
2021	Martha's Vineyard Mysteries	Britt Prajna	"A Beautiful Place to Die", "Riddled with Deceit", "Ships in the Night", "Poisoned in Paradise"
2024	A Novel Noel	Jasmine	Hallmark TV Movie
