= Fantastic Four: World's Greatest Heroes =

2006 animated series based on the Marvel characters

- Genre: Superhero; Action-adventure; Science fiction
- Based on: Fantastic Four by: Stan Lee; Jack Kirby
- Developed by: Craig Kyle; Christopher Yost
- Written by: Christopher Yost
- Directed by: Franck Michel
- Voices of: Hiro Kanagawa; Lara Gilchrist; Christopher Jacot; Brian Dobson; Sam Vincent; Paul Dobson; Sunita Prasad
- Composer: Noam Kaniel
- Countries of origin: United States; France
- Original languages: English; French
- No. of seasons: 1
- No. of episodes: 26

Production
- Executive producers: Christophe di Sabatino; Benoît di Sabatino; Nicolas Atlan; Avi Arad; Craig Kyle; Eric S. Rollman; Robin Lyons
- Editors: Bertrand Martineu; Benoit Tricot; Valerie Chappellet; Sandrine Mercier
- Running time: 21–22 minutes
- Production companies: Marvel Studios; MoonScoop

Original release
- Network: M6 (France); Cartoon Network (Europe/United States); Nicktoons (United States)
- Release: September 2, 2006 – February 25, 2010

Related
- Fantastic Four (1994 TV series)

Fantastic Four: World's Greatest Heroes is a superhero animated television series based on the Marvel Comics superhero team of the same name. The series was co-produced by Marvel Studios and MoonScoop, with the participation of M6 and Cartoon Network Europe, and distributed by Taffy Entertainment.

== Plot ==
World's Greatest Heroes is not directly connected to any of the previous iterations of the Fantastic Four, telling its own version of the team's origin and their encounters with their rogues gallery. Unlike its 1994 predecessor, which consisted almost entirely of straight or modified reinterpretations of classic Fantastic Four comic book stories, World's Greatest Heroes primarily features original stories, though elements from various comic iterations of the Fantastic Four were used in the series, as well as the live-action film.

== Cast ==
=== Main ===
- Hiro Kanagawa – Reed Richards / Mister Fantastic
- Lara Gilchrist – Susan Storm / Invisible Woman
- Christopher Jacot – Johnny Storm / Human Torch
- Brian Dobson – Ben Grimm / The Thing, Flatman
- Sam Vincent – H.E.R.B.I.E., Trapster, Peter Parker
- Paul Dobson – Victor von Doom / Doctor Doom, Mole Man, Captain Ultra, Doombots
- Sunita Prasad – Alicia Masters

=== Guest stars ===
- Mark Acheson – Attuma
- Michael Adamthwaite – Namor
- Don Brown – Henry Peter Gyrich
- Trevor Devall – Diablo
- Michael Dobson – Ronan the Accuser, Mr. Bonner-Davis
- Brian Drummond – Agent Pratt
- Laura Drummond – Courtney Bonner-Davis
- Mark Gibbon – Hulk
- Jonathan Holmes – Wizard
- Andrew Kavadas – Bruce Banner
- David Kaye – Tony Stark/Iron Man
- Terry Klassen – Impossible Man
- Scott McNeil – Annihilus
- Colin Murdock – Willie Lumpkin
- Peter New – Rupert the Geek
- John Novak – Supreme Intelligence
- Mark Oliver – Kl'rt/Super-Skrull
- John Payne – Hank Pym/Ant-Man
- Alvin Sanders – Phillip Masters/Puppet Master
- Rebecca Shoichet – Jennifer Walters/She-Hulk, Squirrel Girl
- Venus Terzo – Lucia von Bardas
- Lee Tockar – Terminus

== Production ==
In October 2004, it was announced Marvel Studios and MoonScoop Group would be teaming up to produce an animated series based on the Marvel Comics' Fantastic Four comic book series which would be shopped to potential buyers. After development began, Christopher Yost was hired to serve as story editor for the series and worked with Craig Kyle, in developing the series. In March 2006, it was announced Cartoon Network had picked up the series for broadcast.

== Episodes ==
| No. | Title | Written by | Original release date | Prod. code |
|---|---|---|---|---|
| 1 | "Doomsday" | Story by : Christopher Yost; Storyboarded by : Olivier Poirette and Franck Michel | September 16, 2006 (U.S.) | 101 |
Reed is accused of purposely exposing the Fantastic Four to cosmic rays. He soon finds out that the paper has been altered by Dr. Doom who plans to open another dimension.
| 2 | "Molehattan" | Story by : Avi Arad; Teleplay by : Chris Hicks and Francis Lombard; Storyboarded by : Olivier Poirette | September 4, 2009 (U.S.) | 102 |
After kidnapping Ben, Mole Man attempts to get the Thing to join forces with him and his Moloids to create an underground paradise where appearances don't matter.
| 3 | "Trial by Fire" | Story by : Bob Forward; Storyboarded by : Yacine Elghorri and Laurent Delion | September 2, 2006 | 103 |
After destroying a robot, Johnny inexplicably disappears. He finds himself in a stadium filled with aliens, where he has been put on trial for crimes against the Kree Empire, with Ronan the Accuser acting as judge. Meanwhile, Ben attempts to entertain the guests at a charity event. Reed is summoned to act as Johnny's lawyer while Ben and Sue are summoned as witnesses. Unfortunately, Ben and Sue's testimonies fail to help Johnny's case. Johnny is sentenced to immediate execution by robotic creatures. Ben, Sue, and Reed fight the robot executioners, one of which is accidentally thrown into the crowd. Johnny protects a Kree child in the audience from the errant robot, which inspires the crowd to demand that Johnny be exonerated and released. Feeling humiliated at having to appease the crowd, Ronan releases Johnny. The Kree return to their home world whereupon Ronan is banished from the Kree Empire, while the Supreme Intelligence notes that the Fantastic Four may be useful against the Skrull. Note: In this episode, the opening theme music has been pitch-shifted to a noticeably lower key.
| 4 | "Doomed" | Story by : Rob Loos and George Taweel; Storyboarded by : Christophe Pittet | September 9, 2006 | 104 |
The four return from extinguishing a fire that Johnny started, with Ben and Sue upset with him. Johnny apologizes, saying that he'll do anything to make it up to them. Doctor Doom switches bodies with Reed by injecting into him anesthesia. With Reed stuck in Doom's body, he slowly escapes the confines of Doom's lair. The next day, Johnny wakes up and finds a camera crew in his room. Sue explains that, as payback for yesterday, Johnny must be followed around by 'A Day in the Life' so viewers can find out what a day in the life of the Fantastic Four is like. When Doom, as Reed, tells Sue to cancel his lectures, the three figure out something's up. Reed, as Doom, shows up at the Baxter Building and is greeted by the four. Believing him to be Doom, they trap him. Reed eventually convinces Sue to trust him and together they stop Doom from turning the Baxter Building into a weapon while also switching their bodies back.
| 5 | "Puppet Master" | Story by : Joseph Kelly; Teleplay by : Rob Loos and George Taweel; Storyboarded by : Luc Blanchard | June 16, 2007 | 105 |
Alicia's stepfather acquires a supply of clay irradiated from a fallen piece of Reed's ill-fated space station that allows him to control others as the Puppet Master.
| 6 | "Zoned Out" | Story by : Craig Kyle and Christopher Yost; Teleplay by : Bob Forward; Storyboarded by : Luis Ruiz | October 28, 2006 | 106 |
Things take a turn for the worse when Johnny gives his friend Frankie an unauthorized tour of Reed's lab. When Frankie is sucked into another dimension, Johnny goes in after her to prevent anyone from finding out. But as he does so, a small bug comes through the dimensional portal. Susan, Ben, and Reed now have to deal with the bug as it multiplies and slowly destroys the Baxter Building while Frankie and Johnny are trapped in the other dimension and look like they will be killed by worse versions of the bugs. In the end, Johnny and Frankie get back to Earth and the bugs are all put back to where they belong – except for one who remains in an old lady's fridge.
| 7 | "Hard Knocks" | Story by : Joshua Fine; Storyboarded by : Roland Boschi | September 23, 2006 | 107 |
Bruce Banner visits Reed at the Baxter Building. Banner changes into the Hulk and now the Fantastic Four must stop his rampage in NYC and keep him from being captured by Agent Pratt who wants to use the Hulk for his bosses' own agenda. In the end, Pratt fails to stop Hulk and the Hulk is loose in the badlands. The Fantastic Four have saved the day again as Pratt and his men are arrested by the U.S. army led by General "Thunderbolt" Ross.
| 8 | "My Neighbor Was a Skrull" | Story by : Craig Kyle and Christopher Yost; Teleplay by : Joseph Kelly; Storyboarded by : Christophe Pittet | September 30, 2006 (U.S.) | 108 |
Skrulls impersonate the Fantastic Four's neighbors in order to collect tissue samples from the Fantastic Four. In the end, Skrull commander Kl'rt tells Ronan the Accuser all samples have been collected for him to begin making the greatest warrior the universe has ever known.
| 9 | "World's Tiniest Heroes" | Story by : Craig Kyle and Christopher Yost; Teleplay by : Joshua Fine; Storyboarded by : Olivier Poirette | October 21, 2006 (U.S.) | 109 |
One of Reed's Microverse experiments causes the Fantastic Four to shrink putting them at risk when H.E.R.B.I.E. mistakes them for vermin and tries to exterminate them. The Fantastic Four are assisted by Ant-Man when it comes to getting to the lab and once there their lives are saved with Ant-Man's help.
| 10 | "De-Mole-Ition" | Story by : Craig Kyle and Christopher Yost; Teleplay by : Bob Forward; Storyboarded by : Laurent Delion | November 4, 2006 (U.S.) | 110 |
The Mole Man uses Giganto attacks the Baxter Building in hopes of luring the Fantastic Four to his underground lair.
| 11 | "Impossible" | Story by : Craig Kyle and Christopher Yost; Teleplay by : Rob Loos and George Taweel; Storyboarded by : Jeremie Bonachera | June 23, 2007 (U.S.) | 111 |
The Impossible Man is brought to Earth by one of Reed's space probes and immediately starts causing trouble for everyone. In the end, the Fantastic Four convince Impossible Man that Earth isn't as fun as he is.
| 12 | "Bait & Switch" | Story by : Craig Kyle and Christopher Yost; Teleplay by : Bob Forward; Storyboarded by : Luis Ruiz | June 30, 2007 (U.S.) | 112 |
Doctor Doom hijacks one of Reed's experiments aimed at restoring Ben Grimm to human form and causes the Fantastic Four to swap powers with one another.
| 13 | "Annihilation" | Story by : Craig Kyle and Christopher Yost; Teleplay by : Christopher Yost; Storyboarded by : Roland Boschi | July 14, 2007 (U.S.) | 113 |
The Fantastic Four are brought to the Negative Zone where they come face to face with Annihilus. As if that wasn't bad enough, Doctor Doom arrives stealing Annihilus' power source and threatening Earth.
| 14 | "Revenge of the Skrulls" | Story by : Craig Kyle and Christopher Yost; Teleplay by : Bob Forward; Storyboarded by : Luc Blanchard | August 11, 2007 | 114 |
The Fantastic Four hold a contest where the winner gets to spend the day with the Fantastic Four. The winner ended up being a fan named Rupert the Geek. Having acquired their tissue samples back in "My Neighbor Was A Skrull", the Skrulls now have the technology to duplicate the abilities of the Fantastic Four. Unknown to the Skrulls, Commander Kl'rt, the genius behind the breakthrough, is actually getting help from Ronan the Accuser in his next plot against the Fantastic Four.
| 15 | "Strings" | Story by : Craig Kyle and Christopher Yost; Teleplay by : Joshua Fine; Storyboarded by : Christophe Pittet | August 25, 2007 (U.S.) | 115 |
The Puppet Master gets the city to turn on the Fantastic Four by controlling its public officials like the Mayor of New York City and the Chief of Police. Evicted from their home much to the excitement of Courtney Bonner-Davis as well as their accounts frozen and their property seized, the Fantastic Four must clear their good names and stop the Puppet Master from taking over the minds of everyone on Earth.
| 16 | "Imperius Rex" | Story by : Craig Kyle and Christopher Yost; Teleplay by : Len Uhley; Storyboarded by : Olivier Poirette | June 9, 2007 (U.S.) | 116 |
Namor arrives with a decree banning humankind from the oceans. Susan and Johnny go underwater to negotiate, but are taken prisoner in Atlantis. Ben and Reed must fight their way through sea monsters, Atlantean soldiers, and Namor to save their teammates.
| 17 | "Doomsday Plus One" | Story by : Bob Forward; Storyboarded by : Laurent Delion | April 27, 2007; September 1, 2007 (U.S.) | 117 |
Doombots invade the Baxter Building in the middle of the night, but their attack is just a distraction for Doctor Doom to launch the Baxter Building into space.
| 18 | "The Cure" | Story by : Dan Slott; Teleplay by : Christopher Yost; Storyboarded by : Jeremie Bonachera | June 9, 2007; January 18, 2010 (U.S.) | 118 |
Reed finally cures the Thing, but the cure also takes away all of his memories since the formation of the Fantastic Four. In order to find a replacement for Thing, the other members of the Fantastic Four hold auditions where She-Hulk wins over the other candidates Squirrel Girl, Captain Ultra, Texas Twister, Frog-Man, and Flatman. When the Mole Man attacks with an army of Lava Men, She-Hulk must fill in for the Thing while the powerless Ben Grimm must find a way to save the day.
| 19 | "Frightful" | Story by : Len Uhley; Storyboarded by : Luis Ruiz | August 18, 2007; January 27, 2010 (U.S.) | 119 |
The Frightful Four (consisting of The Wizard, Klaw, Trapster, and Dragon Man) is the new team in town saving New York always one step ahead of the Fantastic Four. Johnny even tries to prove that the Fantastic Four are still active in heroics by enlisting a photographer named Peter Parker. Reed begins to suspects that the Frightful Four are not the heroes they appear to be.
| 20 | "Out of Time" | Story by : Joshua Fine; Storyboarded by : Luc Blanchard | September 15, 2007; January 28, 2010 (U.S.) | 120 |
After returning from the past to find out what killed the dinosaurs, the Fantastic Four return to New York to find that the whole city has been conquered by Doctor Doom.
| 21 | "Atlantis Attacks!" | Story by : Craig Kyle and Christopher Yost; Teleplay by : Bob Forward; Storyboarded by : Olivier Poirette | September 1, 2007 (U.S.) | 121 |
Namor returns. This time, he needs help to defeat Attuma who has overthrown Atlantis. While Reed, Susan, and Ben head off to help free Atlantis, Johnny stays behind and faces an attack on the city from a giant mutant whale.
| 22 | "Shell Games" | Story by : Rob Hoegee; Storyboarded by : Roland Boschi | October 6, 2007; February 8, 2010 (U.S.) | 122 |
After several attacks from Iron Man armors, the Fantastic Four track down Tony Stark. It turns out Doctor Doom was behind the attacks, and now the Four have to face both Iron Doom and Iron Man under Doom's control.
| 23 | "Johnny Storm and the Potion of Fire" | Story by : Craig Kyle and Christopher Yost; Teleplay by : Len Uhley; Storyboarded by : Luc Blanchard | October 13, 2007; February 22, 2010 (U.S.) | 123 |
During a confrontation with Diablo, Johnny is accidentally exposed to one of Diablo's potions he planned to use to gain control of all the elements.
| 24 | "Contest of Champions" | Story by : Joshua Fine; Storyboarded by : Jeremie Bonachera | October 20, 2007; February 23, 2010 (U.S.) | 124 |
At the request of Ronan the Accuser, the Grandmaster forces the Fantastic Four to compete in his game against Ronan, Impossible Man, Annihilus, and Super-Skrull. The fate of all humanity hangs in the balance as the species of the losers are wiped out. In the final fight, Ronan bulks up and grows to monstrous proportions to brutally beat Ben. After Ronan shocked the crowd with his overwhelming strength, Grandmaster ultimately decides to wipe out Ronan and give Ben a desire.
| 25 | "Doom's Word Is Law" | Story by : Craig Kyle; Teleplay by : Paul Giacoppo; Storyboarded by : Luis Ruiz | February 24, 2010 (U.S.) | 125 |
Doctor Doom creates a Doombot adaptoid to face the Fantastic Four. The Four try and retrain this Doombot to be on their side. In the end, Ben becomes the robot's friend and names him "Bruiser", but then Doctor Doom's control is too strong and it captures Susan and Reed. Johnny and Ben must save Susan and Reed, and fight Doom. But when Johnny is captured, Ben is left to fight Bruiser.
| 26 | "Scavenger Hunt" | Story by : Christopher Yost and Craig Kyle; Storyboarded by : Olivier Poirette | February 25, 2010 (U.S.) | 126 |
Terminus, an alien scavenger, comes to steal all of Earth's resources. While the Fantastic Four try everything to stop him, they realize he may be unbeatable.

== Broadcast ==
During its original run on Cartoon Network, the series was subject to an erratic airing schedule, with only 8 of 26 episodes being broadcast. Cartoon Network briefly brought the series back in June 2007 to tie in with the release of Fantastic Four: Rise of the Silver Surfer, but this run would also be cut short. As a result, the series was not broadcast in its entirety until 2009, when Nicktoons acquired the rights to air it alongside Wolverine and the X-Men and Iron Man: Armored Adventures.

== Home releases ==
| DVD name | Region 1 | Episodes | DVD name | Region 4 | Episodes |
|---|---|---|---|---|---|
| Volume One | March 27, 2007 | "Doomed"; "Hard Knocks"; "World's Tiniest Heroes"; "De-Mole-Ition" | Volume One | October 10, 2007 | "Trial by Fire"; "Doomed"; "Doomsday"; "Hard Knocks" |
| Volume Two | September 11, 2007 | "Trial by Fire"; "My Neighbor Was a Skrull"; "Impossible"; "Revenge of the Skrulls" | Volume Two | October 10, 2007 | "My Neighbor Was a Skrull"; "World's Tiniest Heroes"; "Zoned Out"; "Puppet Master" |
| Volume Three | March 11, 2008 | "Annihilation"; "Doomsday Plus One"; "Out of Time"; "Shell Games" | Volume Three | February 6, 2008 | "De-Mole-ition"; "Impossible"; "Bait and Switch"; "Revenge of the Skrulls" |
| The Complete First Season | June 10, 2008 | All 26 episodes of the series | Volume Four | June 4, 2008 | "Doomsday Plus One"; "Annihilation"; "Strings"; "Imperious Rex" |
| | | | Volume Five | September 3, 2008 | "The Cure"; "Frightful"; "Atlantis Attack"; "Out of Time"; "Shell Games" |
