= Fantastic Four (2005 video game) =

Fantastic 4
- North American PlayStation 2 cover art
- Developers: 7 Studios; Beenox (PC); Torus Games (GBA); Mforma (mobile)
- Publishers: Activision; Mforma (mobile)
- Director: Sara Margaret Stohl
- Producers: Julia Humphreys; Nabil Yared & Stéphane Brault (PC)
- Designer: Jeffery Gardiner
- Programmers: Paul Haban; Gérard Bélair & Sébastien Poirier (PC)
- Artists: Damon Conn; Barclay Chantel; Carl Loiselle (PC)
- Writers: Zak Penn; Martin Signore
- Composers: Rik W. Schaffer; Jason Freedman
- Platforms: GameCube; PlayStation 2; Xbox; Windows; Game Boy Advance; J2ME
- Release: NA: June 27, 2005; AU: July 1, 2005; EU: July 15, 2005
- Genres: Action-adventure, beat 'em up
- Modes: Single-player, multiplayer

Fantastic 4 is an action-adventure beat 'em up video game based on the 2005 film of the same name, developed by 7 Studios and published by Activision. Players play as the characters of the Marvel Comics superhero team Fantastic Four using combos and special attacks to fight their way through hordes of enemies and bosses. Ioan Gruffudd, Jessica Alba, Michael Chiklis, Chris Evans and Julian McMahon reprise their roles for the game. It was followed by Fantastic Four: Rise of the Silver Surfer, itself based on the film of the same name, released in 2007, with 2K taking over Activision from publishing the game.

== Gameplay ==
The game is primarily a third-person action beat 'em up game, with minor platforming and puzzle elements, which can be played either solo or in co-op. Players move through the levels as one or two members of the Fantastic Four, defeating various enemies, such as robots, street punks, underground creatures, and cosmic aliens, and destroying objects. Each of the four have their special abilities:

- Mister Fantastic has the ability to shift his body (or portions of the same) into a super-malleable state, enabling him to stretch, contract, deform, expand, elongate, compress or otherwise reshape his physical form at his will. He can also hack terminals by aligning rings in a puzzle.
- Invisible Woman possesses the ability to bend light and ultimately become invisible (wholly or partially) at will. She also has telekinetic powers and the ability to project force energy from her body. She can also use her invisibility to avoid security cameras and sneak up on unsuspecting enemies and instantly kill them.
- The Human Torch can manipulate fire. He usually allows his entire body to be engulfed in flames, since it can withstand extreme heat. Another ability of his is flight, which players can use in the game. He can also create holes in locked doors and throw fireballs as a ranged attack.
- The Thing is incredibly strong and has an exterior stronger than diamonds. Ben Grimm can carry heavy objects with ease and deal heavy damage to enemies, as players will find out while playing as this character.

As the players defeat enemies and complete tasks, they earn points that can be used to upgrade the characters' attacks, as well as for bonus artwork, interviews with the film's cast, and biographies. By performing different button combinations, the players build up an orange bar, which, when full, grants them a super move, which varies depending on the character (The Thing stomps around with a powerful spinning attack, Mr. Fantastic turns into a wheel that damages anything he comes into contact with, and both Invisible Woman and Human Torch have a radial clearing attack). One team member can also "buff" another member, eg. Invisible Woman encases Mr. Fantastic in a protective bubble for a short time.

The game includes a number of villains and characters not featured in the film, many of whom are based on their Ultimate Universe versions like the Yancy Street Gang, Mole Man, Puppet Master, and Nick Fury. Horus, Diablo, Dragon Man, Blastaar, and Annihilus appear as bosses, during which players have control of the entire team. Players can also find hidden "F4 Tokens" in each level, which unlock arenas for the game's combat arena mode, as well as bonus interviews with Stan Lee and the game's developers. Completing the game on certain difficulties unlocks two bonus levels in Latveria. With a cheat code, an extra level set in Hell can also be unlocked.

== Plot ==
Reed Richards, Susan Storm, and Johnny Storm lie helpless on a roof, having been knocked unconscious by Doctor Doom. Sue recovers and finds Doom preparing to fire an electric blast at them, before she holds it off with her force field and calls Ben Grimm for help. Ben, recovering in the reversion chamber after having his rocklike exterior genetically removed, contemplates why the circumstances have led to this and remembers the period when all of it happened.

This is when it reverts to the beginning of the movie: Reed signs the pact, they go into space, and Ben gets the samples ready. In space, they are hit by a cosmic storm that alters their DNA and gives them superpowers. If it hadn't been for Victor, they might never have arrived back on Earth and into his medical compound, where they recovered. When Ben discovers that he has become a monster-like figure, he deserts the other three and heads home.

Ben runs on a rampage to try to calm himself. This brings the army to New York under the control of a deep, dark, sinister figure who is yet to be revealed, and they try to get Ben under control. However, after Ben and the other three rescue a fire truck from falling off the Brooklyn Bridge, the forces lay off and watch the Fantastic Four to see if they become hostile.

Reed attempts to find another power source, but is interrupted by a call for help. It seems that strange creatures have invaded Grand Central Station, and the police seem to have no effect against them. The Fantastic Four stop the creatures from invading the city and face their leader, the Mole Man and his mighty pet. Because of the utter destruction caused by their fight with this giant monster, the city is in a mess, and Victor blames Reed for all this mess.

With Ben in hand, Reed sets out to identify their mutation and possibly cure them. He constructs a machine with Victor's help that will use cosmic rays to reverse the signal the mutation is sending through their bodies. He then turns to sources to power this machine and identifies a cosmic meteor that landed in the jungle of southern Mexico. They travel to Tikal to retrieve this meteor when they encounter Diablo, who desires to have this meteor so he can harness its power to conquer the world. The Fantastic Four defeat him and bring the meteor back, but its power is insufficient to power the machine. Later that night, Victor invites Sue to the opening of his Egyptian wing at the museum.

While they are there, Alicia Masters is kidnapped by the mummy creatures who have come to life by the Puppet Master, which throws Ben into an outrage. Reed intends to disable the security system to free her, but they have to deal with animated mummies and dinosaurs. They free Alicia but end up destroying half the museum while repelling the reanimated creatures, which infuriates Victor to no end.

In his last attempt to alleviate his anger towards them, he has a conversation with Sue to find out why she continues to stay with Reed. She says she can't abandon them because they're her family now, which prompts Victor to send Doombots after them to destroy them once their meeting ends. The four have a massive battle in Times Square, which they nearly demolish with the help of the VDI Mechs, prompting Nick Fury to take them to the Vault prison for their safekeeping.

They arrive there and are quarantined until Dragon Man decides to break out and cause utter chaos. The Fantastic Four's security systems are deactivated, and they try to restore order. They are successful in their escape, and when they reach the entrance at the top of the prison, they encounter Fury, who agrees to release them on one condition: that they find out what happened to his underground laboratory.

They are teleported to the lab through a portal, and are initially separated, with Reed and Ben forming one group, and Susan and Johnny forming another. Reed and Ben progress through the facility, which has been completely transformed by cosmic radiation, fighting otherworldly, spider-like creatures as they do. Eventually they reunite with Susan and Johnny and face a mutated creature known as a "plasma worm". Upon defeating the creature, the team exits the lab and is officially released from captivity by Nick Fury, with Reed requesting they be sent to the space station to recover its leftover shielding.

When they arrive, they discover the station has been overrun by mutated plants and insectoid creatures. Johnny fights his way through and powers up the station, followed shortly by the rest of the team. After obtaining the shielding panels needed to complete the reversion chamber, Reed activates the station's self-destruct mechanisms. The team is quickly able to escape and Reed's reversion chamber is rendered fully operational by the recovered shielding panels.

With this knowledge, Victor travels to the Baxter Building with the intent to defeat the Fantastic Four. He sets Reed's security systems against them and lures Ben to the reversion chamber, where he steals his power. The remaining three fight against an enhanced Dr. Doom, but his power is too great, and they are defeated. Ben, however, feels terrible for leaving his friends just because he wanted to look normal again, so he decides to re-enter the chamber and turn back into the Thing. Just as Dr. Doom is about to kill them, Ben bursts out onto the roof and attacks him, allowing his teammates to recover. They fall to the street, and the other three join them there to defeat Doom once and for all.

== Development ==
Zak Penn and Martin Signore co-wrote the story for the game. Penn also wrote a draft of the film, which served as the basis of the game. The game was released in North America on June 27, Australia on July 1, and Europe on July 15, 2005.

== Reception ==
Reception

Aggregate scores
Aggregator	Score
GameRankings	(GC) 65.02% (PC) 64.35% (PS2) 62.18% (Xbox) 61.50% (GBA) 55.50%
Metacritic	(PS2) 64/100 (PC) 63/100 (Xbox) 62/100 (GC) 61/100 (GBA) 57/100

Review scores
Publication	Score
Electronic Gaming Monthly	5.67/10
Eurogamer	6/10
Game Informer	7.5/10
GameRevolution	C−
GameSpot	(GBA) 7.1/10; 5.8/10
GameSpy	3.5/5
GameZone	8.7/10 (Xbox) 8.5/10 (PC) 7.5/10 (GBA) 6.9/10
IGN	6.5/10 (GBA) 5/10
Nintendo Power	(GBA) 6.5/10 (GC) 6/10
Official U.S. PlayStation Magazine	3.5/5
Official Xbox Magazine (US)	6.3/10
PC Gamer (US)	52%
Detroit Free Press	3/4

Reviews of the game were mixed. GameRankings gave it a score of 62.18% for the PlayStation 2 version, 61.50% for the Xbox version, 65.02% for the GameCube version, 64.35% for the PC version, and 55.50% for the Game Boy Advance version. Likewise, Metacritic gave it a score of 64 out of 100 for the PS2 version, 62 out of 100 for the Xbox version, 61 out of 100 for the GameCube version, 63 out of 100 for the PC version, and 57 out of 100 for the GBA version.

IGN rated the game a 6.5 of 10 stating that "Fantastic 4 is a passable action game with some interesting ideas. In short, rent this one first".

The game got some retrospective praise for paving the way of Marvel: Ultimate Alliance.

== Music ==
The game is notable for having four bands record brand new songs to be used as the themes for the characters. It also used a demo version of John Ottman's main theme from the film as the main menu theme. The bands who contributed songs and who their song was for are:

- Taking Back Sunday — "Error Operator" (Mr. Fantastic)
- Go Betty Go — "Everywhere" (Invisible Woman)
- The Explosion — "I'm On Fire" (Human Torch)
- Jurassic 5 — "Clobberin' Time" (The Thing)
- John Ottman — "Theme From 'Fantastic Four'" (Main Menu Theme)

== Sales ==
The game sold 320,000 units and generated more than $16 million in revenue.
