= Klaw (character) =

Marvel Comics supervillain

- Klaw battles the Fantastic Four on the cover of Fantastic Four #56 (Nov. 1966).

Publication information
- Publisher: Marvel Comics
- First appearance: as Ulysses Klaw: Fantastic Four #53 (Aug. 1966); as Klaw: Fantastic Four #56 (Nov. 1966)
- Created by: Stan Lee (writer); Jack Kirby (artist)

In-story information
- Alter ego: Ulysses Klaue
- Species: Human mutate
- Team affiliations: Frightful Four; Masters of Evil; A.I.M.; Fearsome Foursome Lethal Legion
- Notable aliases: Ulysses Klaw; Master of Sound
- Abilities: Genius-level intellect; Immortality; Superhuman strength, stamina, durability, and speed; Sonic device grants: Sound manipulation

Klaw (Ulysses Klaue) is a supervillain appearing in American comic books published by Marvel Comics. The character is depicted as a human physicist who has been transformed into solid sound, and who wears a sonic emitter on his right wrist as a prosthetic device. He is often in conflict with the Fantastic Four and the Avengers, and he is also an enemy of the Black Panther and Ka-Zar.

The character is featured in other Marvel-endorsed products such as arcade and video games, animated television series, and merchandise such as trading cards. Andy Serkis portrays Klaue in the Marvel Cinematic Universe (MCU) films Avengers: Age of Ultron (2015) and Black Panther (2018), and the Disney+ series What If...? (2021).

== Publication history ==
The character first appeared in Fantastic Four #53 (1966) and was created by Stan Lee and Jack Kirby.

== Fictional character biography ==
Ulysses Klaue is the son of Nazi war criminal Colonel Fritz Klaue of the Blitzkrieg Squad led by Baron Strucker. He was sent by Adolf Hitler to the African nation of Wakanda to learn their secrets. After World War II, Klaue moved back to Belgium, anglicized his name to "Klaw", and raised his son with tales of Wakanda.

Klaw later becomes a physicist, working in the field of applied sonics. To continue his design of a sound transducer which converts sound waves into physical mass, Klaw steals the metal vibranium to power his device. This is a metal substance known to exist only in certain meteoric deposits in Wakanda. Klaw comes into conflict with the Wakandan ruler/superhero T'Chaka, whom Klaw murders in cold blood. T'Chaka's adolescent son T'Challa, who watched his father die, attacks Klaw to avenge his father. Klaw manages to escape at the cost of his right hand.

Years later, Ulysses resurfaces with a sonic emitter/gun on his right wrist as a replacement prosthetic device for his missing hand, that can create any kind of object or creature he can conceive using sound. He has also created a device that turns him into a being made of sound, making him immortal in the process. Klaw as a professional criminal battles T'Challa (who has become the newest Black Panther) and superhero team the Fantastic Four in New York state, but he is defeated.

Klaw is imprisoned but freed by the Crimson Cowl, which turns out to be an alias of Ultron. Joining the second incarnation of the Masters of Evil, Klaw and the other villains battle the Avengers. The Avengers, however, defeat them, with Black Panther subduing Klaw.

Klaw joins forces with Solarr and traps the Avengers within a solid sound barrier. Klaw threatens to execute them if the Black Panther does not abdicate the throne of Wakanda to him. Realizing that Klaw himself is disguised as one of the hostages while using a sound creation of himself to appear outside the barrier, Black Panther manages to expose and subdue Klaw and Solarr before they can make good on their threat.

Klaw is freed from prison by a member of the extra-dimensional Sheenareans, who wish him to use his sonic powers to help open a dimensional portal for their armada to enter Earth. Klaw agrees and after a skirmish with Ka-Zar in London, he travels with the Sheenarean to the Savage Land, where there is a vibranium deposit large enough to create the portal. After Ka-Zar repulses the invaders, Klaw flees.

Klaw's career soon takes a downward spiral, after an encounter with Dazzler results in his humanoid form being dissolved and his sound energy being blasted out into space, where it ends up being collected by Galactus. His energy is found by Doctor Doom during the limited series Secret Wars. Doom restores Klaw to normal. The loss of his physical form has had repercussions; Klaw now has the mind of a child and is quite insane, a symptom of which is speaking in rhyme. Doom exploits Klaw's madness, convincing the villain to re-dissect him as part of a mad gambit to steal the powers of both Galactus and the Beyonder. However, the Beyonder possesses Klaw after losing his powers, leading to Klaw tricking Doom into giving up his stolen Godhood and teleporting the two back to Earth, where Klaw's mental state slowly heals.

Klaw is recruited by the Wizard to join his latest incarnation of the Frightful Four. Attacking the Fantastic Four while the group are performing a delicate scientific procedure on the Human Torch (whose powers had gone out of control), Klaw throws the Thing into the medical pod that was attempting to drain the excess radiation from Torch, resulting in the Thing being restored to his human form. Klaw and his teammates, along with the Fantastic Four, are captured by Aron, who returns Klaw and his fellow villains to prison after the Fantastic Four break free.

Klaw later joins Crimson Cowl's version of the Masters of Evil, fighting the Thunderbolts on several occasions.

When Earth's vibranium deposits begin to explode due to a 'vibranium cancer' introduced into the world when Captain America's shield was broken and improperly repaired, Klaw travels to Wakanda with the goal of absorbing the sound energy of the imminent explosion to empower himself. Captain America is able to defeat him when he uses the damaged shield to absorb Klaw's attack. The blast realigns the shield molecules so that the shield is repaired and the vibranium cancer destroyed.

Klaw is enlisted by the Wizard to capture Carnage, so that he can be added to the latest version of the Frightful Four, alongside Karl Malus. The Wizard's attempts to control the symbiote fail, so he decides to bond it to Malus, and subdue his mind. Klaw subdues Malus, and the operation is a success, creating "Superior Carnage". The "Frightful Foundation" then attack New York city hall, as part of Wizard's plan to get his clone son's attention. During a battle with Superior Spider-Man, Wizard loses control of Superior Carnage, who stabs Klaw with a vibranium spear, causing him to detonate. Klaw's consciousness is projected onto the "sound wall" of the universe, spreading him too thin to retain his form.

During the Avengers: Standoff! storyline, Klaw appears as an inmate of Pleasant Hill, a gated community established by S.H.I.E.L.D.

== Powers and abilities ==
Courtesy of a vibranium-powered sonic converter, Ulysses Klaw was converted into a being composed of psionically "solidified" sound, giving him a somewhat inhuman appearance. The character is described as having superhuman durability and strength sufficient to lift tons of matter. The molybdenum steel sound generator that serves as a prosthetic appliance on Klaw's right wrist is able to transform ambient sound to perform a series of functions, including the projection of intense high-volume sonic waves and blasts of concussive force and the creation of mobile sound/mass constructs. The sound converter was invented by Klaw and later improved by AIM scientists and technicians. Klaw can also sense his surroundings using sonar. When he fought Volcana while trying to abduct Molecule Man he demonstrated the ability to create "cohesive sound". This was essentially an entangling/crushing construct that absorbed ambient noise to increase its size and strength. The noise from the target's struggles to remove the construct would make it larger and stronger. Volcana was only able to escape it by changing into her ash form. After Klaw became temporarily commingled with the ship of Galactus and reconstructed by Doctor Doom, he became able to create semi-autonomous creatures made of solidified sound.

Klaw is unable to regain his original organic form. He has a susceptibility to vibranium, which can cause his body to temporarily collapse. He is also subject to temporary mild insanity when forced to exist as sonic energy without humanoid form for long periods of time. As a result of his transformation, Klaw was at first unable to exist outside a medium that allows the propagation of sound waves (i.e. in a vacuum) without the technological improvements made to his sonic converter by A.I.M. After being reconstituted by A.I.M., his "solid sound" body has different properties than normal sound waves and is not affected by a vacuum. In this form, Klaw can also generate and direct sonic attacks through physical objects without needing his emitter.

Klaw holds a Ph.D. in physics and is an expert physicist specializing in applied sonics.

== Reception ==
- In 2018, ComicBook.com ranked Klaw 2nd in their "8 Best Black Panther Villains" list.
- In 2020, Comic Book Resources (CBR) ranked Klaw 4th in their "Marvel: Ranking Black Panther's Rogues Gallery" list.
- In 2022, Screen Rant included Klaw in their "15 Most Powerful Black Panther Villains" list.
- In 2022, CBR ranked Klaw 2nd in their "10 Most Iconic Black Panther Villains" list.

== Other versions ==
- Klaw appears in "Heroes Reborn" as a member of Loki's Masters of Evil.
- An alternate version going by Ulysses Klaue exists in the Ultimate Universe imprint, appearing in the Ultimate Hawkeye one-shot.

== In other media ==
=== Television ===
- Klaw appears in Fantastic Four (1967), voiced by Hal Smith.
- Klaw makes a non-speaking cameo appearance in the Spider-Man and His Amazing Friends episode "Attack of the Arachnoid".
- Klaw appears in the Fantastic Four (1994) episode "Prey of the Black Panther", voiced by Charles Howerton. Years ago, he infiltrated Wakanda and killed T'Chaka, but lost his right hand to T'Chaka's son, T'Challa, who goes on to become the Black Panther and seek revenge against Klaw. In the present, Klaw attacks Wakanda, having replaced his missing hand with a sonic inverter. He fights Black Panther and the Fantastic Four, during which he is transformed into an entity made of solidified sound, only to be defeated when the heroes use Vibranium to absorb Klaw.
- Klaw appears in the Fantastic Four: World's Greatest Heroes episode "Frightful", voiced by an uncredited actor. This version is a member of the Frightful Four.
- Klaw appears in The Super Hero Squad Show, voiced by A. J. Buckley. This version is a member of Doctor Doom's Lethal Legion.
- Klaw appears in Black Panther (2010), voiced by Stephen Stanton. This version has a cybernetic hand that can convert into a variety of tools.
- Klaw appears in The Avengers: Earth's Mightiest Heroes, voiced by Mark Hamill. He assists Man-Ape in killing T'Chaka to seize control of Wakanda's Vibranium deposits before being transformed into a sound-based entity after the Grim Reaper blasts him into Wakanda's Vibranium mound.
- Klaw appears in Ultimate Spider-Man, voiced by Matt Lanter. This version is a member of the Frightful Four.
- Ulysses Klaue appears in Avengers Assemble, voiced by David Shaughnessy in the third season and Trevor Devall in the fifth season. This version is a member of the Shadow Council who wields a sonic converter in place of his left hand.
- Ulysses Klaue appears in Lego Marvel Super Heroes: Black Panther – Trouble in Wakanda, voiced again by Trevor Devall.
- Ulysses Klaue appears in the Marvel Future Avengers episode "Black Panther", voiced by Taketora in Japanese and Patrick Seitz in English.
- Klaw appears in Lego Marvel Avengers: Mission Demolition, voiced again by Trevor Devall.
- Klaw appears in Lego Marvel Avengers: Strange Tails, voiced again by Trevor Devall.

=== Marvel Cinematic Universe ===
Andy Serkis as Ulysses Klaue in Avengers: Age of Ultron.

Ulysses Klaue appears in media set in the Marvel Cinematic Universe (MCU), portrayed by Andy Serkis. This version is an Afrikaner arms dealer and an old acquaintance of Tony Stark who was literally branded a thief after stealing Vibranium from Wakanda. Klaue first appears in the live-action film Avengers: Age of Ultron (2015), and makes a subsequent appearance in the live-action film Black Panther (2018). Additionally, Serkis voices an alternate timeline variant of Klaue in the Disney+ animated series What If...? episode "What If... Killmonger Rescued Tony Stark?".

=== Video games ===
- Klaw appears as a boss in Captain America and the Avengers.
- The comics and MCU incarnations of Klaw appear as playable characters in Lego Marvel's Avengers, voiced again by Matt Lanter.
- Klaw appears as a boss and playable character in Lego Marvel Super Heroes 2. Additionally, his MCU counterpart appears as a playable character via the Black Panther DLC.
- Klaw appears as a playable character in Marvel: Future Fight.
- Klaw appears as a boss in Marvel Ultimate Alliance 3: The Black Order, voiced again by David Shaughnessy.
- Klaw appears as the final boss of Marvel's Avengers "War for Wakanda" DLC, voiced by Steve Blum. He and Crossbones are hired by Monica Rappaccini of A.I.M. to steal Vibranium from Wakanda, only for encounter of Black Panther and the Avengers. In the ensuing fight, Klaw is exposed to raw sonic energy-infused Vibranium and transforms into a being of pure sound, but eventually dies as a result of the mutation.
- Klaw appears in Marvel Cosmic Invasion, voiced by Jacob Dudman.
