= Wizard (Marvel Comics) =

Marvel Comics fictional character

- The Wizard as seen in New Avengers #33. Art by Leinil Francis Yu.

Publication information
- Publisher: Marvel Comics
- First appearance: Strange Tales #102 (November 1962)
- Created by: Stan Lee (writer); Larry Lieber (writer); Jack Kirby (artist)

In-story information
- Alter ego: Bentley Wittman
- Species: Human
- Team affiliations: Frightful Four; Intelligencia
- Notable aliases: The Wingless Wizard
- Abilities: Genius intelligence; Mastery of stage magic, escapology, and disguise; Superhuman strength and energy projection via gauntlets; Damage resistance via body armor; Cyberpathy via helmet; Use of anti-gravity discs

Bentley Wittman is a character appearing in American comic books published by Marvel Comics. Created by writers Stan Lee, Larry Lieber, and artist Jack Kirby, the character first appeared in Strange Tales #102 (November 1962). Wittman is a supervillain known under the codenames Wizard and Wingless Wizard. He is an illusionist and tech-genius who appears as a recurring antagonist of the Fantastic Four, especially the Human Torch.

== Publication history ==
Bentley Wittman debuted in Strange Tales #102 (November 1962), created by Stan Lee, Larry Lieber, and Jack Kirby. He subsequently appeared in several Marvel series, including Amazing Spider-Man (1963), Avengers (1963), FF (2011), and Scarlet Witch & Quicksilver (2024).

== Fictional character biography ==
Bentley Wittman grew up possessing near-superhuman levels of genius and was a child prodigy and chess champion. As an adult, he became an inventor of great renown, selling his futuristic inventions to the wealthy and becoming quite rich. He became known as the Wizard by legally assuming this stage name and using his advanced scientific inventions to perform feats of "magic" as a stage magician and escape artist. Intellectually bored, however, he decided to become a professional criminal and defeat Johnny Storm, who had just appeared to the world as the Human Torch. Pretending to be a victim by pretending his attempt to use a new drill had gone wrong and he was trapped, he really had enough air for weeks, he was rescued by the Torch and invited him to his high-tech, futuristic mansion on Long Island. There he captured the Human Torch with ease by pretending to take a three-dimensional photo, but really squirting a liquid onto the Human Torch. The Human Torch was then locked in an asbestos cell at gunpoint. The Wizard impersonated the Human Torch, launching a crime spree to destroy the Human Torch's reputation. However, the Human Torch escaped and with help from the Invisible Girl, got photos showing the Wizard had impersonated him, and the Wizard was sent to prison.

The Wizard had a rematch with the Human Torch before long, escaping from prison using a chemical which melted through stone. He got to his house and used a force field to prevent the police from entering, but allowed the Torch to enter, threatening to blast the police if they tried to get in. The Torch melted a shell the Wizard fired, then created a flaming barrier to protect himself from nerve gas. However the Wizard succeeded in using the Invisible Girl as a hostage, as she had foolishly entered and the Wizard was alerted by an alarm. He trapped both her and the Human Torch in a chamber with a bomb that would activate if the temperature increased by one degree. However the Torch was able to destroy the device, escape, and capture the Wizard. With Paste-Pot Pete, he battled the Human Torch again while impersonating him again, and the Wizard captured the Torch and the Invisible Girl after escaping by disguising himself and using an anti-gravity device. However the two escaped when the Torch used his flame to alert Mister Fantastic and the Thing to their location. The conclusion of one encounter with the Torch sent him flying uncontrollably upward by one of his anti-gravity discs, unable to descend safely. He was rescued by two other adversaries of the Torch: Sandman and Paste-Pot Pete (soon after renamed Trapster). After he suggested they team up, a suggestion by the Trapster inspired him to form a team that would be a criminal counterpart to the Fantastic Four, with himself, his two rescuers, and Medusa, who was then suffering from amnesia; becoming the Frightful Four.

In his continued quest to crush the Fantastic Four, the Wizard has tried many iterations of the Frightful Four and has very rarely operated outside the Frightful Four. He forms a new version of the Frightful Four with Trapster, Sandman, and Electro who would later wear a special outfit that would imitate the Human Torch's powers. They were defeated by Spider-Man and the Fantastic Four.

The Wizard replaced Medusa with Thundra in the Frightful Four, and they battled the Fantastic Four and Medusa. However, Thundra also ended up betraying him and allying herself with the Fantastic Four as Medusa did, with the Brute being recruited to replace her. In a later appearance, Llyra also joins the Frightful Four.

When the Sandman appeared to give up his life of crime, the Wizard formed a new Frightful Four with Hydro-Man, Klaw, and Titania. They invaded Fantastic Four headquarters, but sided with the real Fantastic Four against the Fantastic Four clones created by Aron the Rogue Watcher. After Klaw was defeated, Wizard brought in Dragon Man as a replacement.

When the Fantastic Four's popularity reached an all-time low, the Wizard decided it was time to re-form the Frightful Four once more. No longer motivated by petty jealousy, the Wizard believed the Fantastic Four to be the source of all his troubles, his fall from grace. He rescued the Trapster from the Negative Zone, boosted the powers of Hydro-Man, and called upon his ex-wife Salamandra to round out the Frightful Four. He also manipulated Cole, his and Salamandra's daughter, to develop a relationship with the Human Torch in order to teleport to her and bypass the Fantastic Four's defenses. During the resulting battle, the Wizard turned on the Trapster, revealing that he intended Cole to be the next member of the Frightful Four. When the Frightful Four defeated the heroes, the Wizard flaunted his success on television and left them humiliated. However, when the Wizard admitted that he only wanted to include Cole once he saw her exhibit superhuman powers, she turned on him. She sought out the Fantastic Four to lead them back to her father and to try to find a cure for her powers. The Wizard and Cole confronted each other, and Cole used one of the Trapster's traps to ensnare her father, then used her powers over gravity to bring the Wizard's lair down around him. He has since appeared alive and founded the Frightful Five (himself, Titania, Trapster, Hydro-Man, and Klaw).

The Wizard is among the characters recruited in The Hood's syndicate of villains. He is then seen in a blue uniform reminiscent of his original outfit. Wizard helped them fight the New Avengers but was taken down by Doctor Strange.

Wizard later appears as a member of the Intelligencia. Along with a new Frightful Four, the Wizard attacks the Baxter Building to capture Reed Richards. While the Red Hulk, who came to stop the villains, is distracted by the Thing and an open portal to the Negative Zone, Reed is captured.

Wizard collaborated with Blastaar, with whom who enslaved Medusa and tried to get to know his son Bentley 23. He transported the Baxter Building to the Negative Zone where he and Blastaar had to contend with Ant-Man, She-Hulk, and Miss Thing. When handed over to the Inhumans, Wizard later develops dementia due to Black Bolt injuring him as punishment for enslaving Medusa.

Wizard creates a new Frightful Four with Klaw, Karl Malus, and Carnage. He attempted to control Cletus Kasady's mind, but due to his lobotomy, it was impossible. Wizard instead transferred Kasady's blood into Malus and made him into Superior Carnage. Wizard's goal was to take over NYC City Hall and impress his son, but Superior Spider-Man was able to stop him. Despite losing the battle, Wizard was able to reconnect with his son and regain his mental facilities.

The Wizard subsequently joined the plans of the behind-the-scenes villain known as 'the Quiet Man' to destroy the Fantastic Four, but after his clone rejected him in favour of his friends, followed by him witnessing the scale of the Quiet Man's plans, the Wizard decided to aid the FF against the villain so that he could ensure that his 'son' would grow up in peace.

During the Secret Empire storyline, Wizard joins Helmut Zemo's Army of Evil.

Wizard later takes the Fantastic Four to court to claim custody of Bentley-23, claiming that his caregiver Dragon Man is unsuited for the job. This plot is thwarted when a man claiming to be the real Bentley Wittman appears and claims that Wizard was his clone. Unbeknownst to anyone, the man is actually a perfect clone of Wizard created by Bentley-23.

== Skills and abilities ==
Bentley Wittman has no superpowers, but is described as a genius. He holds PhDs in the different fields of physics. In addition to being an inventor and engineer, Wittman is also skilled as a stage magician, escapologist, and disguise artist.

=== Equipment ===
The Wizard constructed a number of devices for which he employs in his criminal activities:

- His anti-gravity discs allow him to fly and can lift several hundred pounds each.
- His gauntlets (alternatively referred to as Wonder Gloves) can generate potent electrical blasts or utilize directed gravitational fields to strengthen those hands. The gloves' strength are unknown. They even also launch air vortexes for engulfing their targets known as "Typhoon-Spheres".
- His body armor provides him with physical protection, generates a force shield around himself, and mimics powers of the Human Torch. The helmet possesses built-in circuitry that allows a technopathic link to his suit, thus manipulating it by mental commands.

== Clones of Wizard ==
=== Bentley 23 ===
The Fantastic Four managed to find an adolescent clone of the Wizard and rescued it from a super robot the Wizard made. He has since been taken in by the Fantastic Four and only refers to himself as 23 feeling he "hasn't earned his name" as the original Wizard did. At first, he was a highly introverted child, who over time becomes far more outgoing, also becoming more openly proclaiming of wanting to grow up to become a supervillain. He has since joined the Future Foundation.

When faced with the chance of working with his father to trap the rest of the Future Foundation and analyze Franklin's powers, Bentley turned against his 'father' because he decided that he wanted to do the right thing, with Wizard accepting his decision as he regards it as an example of how he might have been if he grew up with a more loving family.

When Wizard took the Fantastic Four to court claiming that Dragon Man is unsuited to be a caregiver, Bentley-23 created a perfect clone of Bentley Wittman behind everyone's back and used the perfect clone to fool Wizard into thinking that he was a clone of Bentley Wittman. Afterwards, Bentley-23 left the Baxter Building and became his own version of Wizard with help from Dragon Man.

=== Perfect clone of Bentley Wittman ===
To avoid getting placed in his creator's custody through the "corrupt" legal system, Bentley-23 created a perfect clone of Bentley Wittman to fool Wizard into thinking that he was the clone of him.

== Other characters named Wizard ==
There are other characters who have also called themselves Wizard:

All Winners Comics #17, which was published in 1945, 17 years before the first appearance of the Fantastic Four villain of the same name, depicts a legend about the eldest member of the Carreaux family, who jilted the daughter of a magic practitioner in favor of marrying a different girl. When the jilted girl committed suicide, her brother killed that Carreaux man, creating a curse which held that if an elder Carreaux were to marry, a dead wizard and his witch partner would appear on their wedding night and kill that Carreaux. By 1946, the Carreaux family butler Frank Lavalle took advantage of that legend when he heard that Philip Carreaux was going to marry a woman named Marguerite, with whom Frank was also in love. While he would pose as the Wizard, an unnamed female accomplice would pose as the Witch. When his brother Dale returned home from military service, Philip met William Naslund and Fred Davis where he told them about the curse involving the Wizard and the Witch. William Naslund and Fred Davis changed into their Captain America and Bucky outfits where they explored the bayou finding any evidence of the Wizard and the Witch. Captain America and Bucky encountered the Wizard who disappeared from Captain America's grasp. Upon finding Philip dead with a knife in his back, Captain America and Bucky encountered the Wizard in another canoe, though he had to let him go to save Bucky from an approaching alligator. When Captain America and Bucky catch up to the Witch and subdue her, she was shot dead as Dale freed Marguerite. Upon examining the Wizard's footprints, Captain America discovered that it matched Frank Lavalle's shoes as Captain America apprehends him. After Frank Lavalle confessed to his motives and the murders, Captain America handed Frank over to the authorities.

Following the 1984 Secret Wars miniseries which concluded with the Thing left on the planet Battleworld, he comes across the kingdom of Leenn which is being terrorized by the Wizard. Thing learns that the Wizard is Laann's version of Doctor Doom and that Laann is this planet's version of Doctor Doom's native country of Latveria. Thing and his ally, a warrior named Tarianna, vanquishes the Wizard.

== Other versions ==
=== House of M ===
An alternate universe version of the Wizard from Earth-58163 appears in House of M: Masters of Evil as a member of the eponymous group.

=== Marvel 1602 ===
A Jacobean-themed alternate universe version of the Wizard from Earth-311 appears in Marvel 1602: Fantastick Four. This version is the self-proclaimed "greatest scientist alive in the year 1602", leader of the Four Who Are Frightful, and husband of Medusa.

=== Marvel Zombies: Dead Days ===
A zombified alternate universe version of the Wizard from Earth-2149 appears in Marvel Zombies: Dead Days.

=== MC2 ===
A possible future version of the Wizard from Earth-982 appears in Fantastic Five. By this time, he has been confined to a hoverchair for which he blames Reed Richards. Seeking revenge, he forms the Wizard's Warriors to attack the Fantastic Five while he locates Richards. He eventually finds Richards' Negative Zone space station only to be captured by its security system and placed in storage.

== In other media ==
=== Television ===
- Bentley Wittman / The Wizard appears in The New Fantastic Four (1978) episode "Frightful Four," voiced by Don Messick. This version possesses supernatural powers instead of technological weapons.
- Bentley Wittman / The Wizard appears in the Spider-Man episode "Under the Wizard's Spell", voiced by George DiCenzo.
- Bentley Wittman / The Wizard appears in the Fantastic Four (1994) episode "And the Wind Cries Medusa", voiced by Ron Perlman.
- Bentley Wittman / The Wizard appears in the Fantastic Four: World's Greatest Heroes episode "Frightful", voiced by Jonathan Holmes.
- Bentley Wittman / The Wizard appears in Ultimate Spider-Man, voiced by Tom Kenny.
- Bentley Wittman / The Wizard makes a non-speaking cameo appearance in the Avengers Assemble episode "The Avengers Protocol".
- Bentley Wittman appears in Your Friendly Neighborhood Spider-Man, voiced by Paul F. Tompkins. This version is an Oscorp scientist.

=== Video games ===
- Bentley Wittman / The Wizard appears in Captain America and The Avengers.
- Bentley Wittman / The Wizard appears as a mini-boss in Marvel: Ultimate Alliance 2, voiced by Danny Mann.
- Bentley Wittman / The Wizard appears as an unlockable character in Lego Marvel Super Heroes.
- Bentley Wittman / The Wizard appears in Marvel Heroes, voiced by Rick D. Wasserman.
- Bentley Wittman / The Wizard appears as an unlockable character in Lego Marvel's Avengers.
