= Invisible Woman =

Fictional character appearing in American comic books published by Marvel Comics

- Portion of the variant cover of Invisible Woman #1 (August 2019). Art by Mattia De Iulis.

Publication information
- Publisher: Marvel Comics
- First appearance: Fantastic Four #1 (November. 1961)
- Created by: Stan Lee (writer); Jack Kirby (artist)

In-story information
- Alter ego: Dr. Susan "Sue" Storm-Richards
- Species: Human mutate
- Team affiliations: Fantastic Four; Avengers; Lady Liberators; Fantastic Four Incorporated; Future Foundation; Seven Brides of Set; Daughters of Liberty
- Notable aliases: Invisible Girl; Invisible Woman; Captain Universe; Susan Benjamin; Malice, Mistress of Hate; Baroness Von Doom; Tabitha Deneuve
- Abilities: Invisibility granting: Projective invisibility; Self-invisibility; Invisible force field projection: Power to control and manipulate objects; Generation of invisible energy constructs; Generation of protective invisible shields; Telepathic immunity; Flight

The Invisible Woman (originally Invisible Girl) is a superhero appearing in American comic books published by Marvel Comics. Created by Stan Lee and Jack Kirby, the character first appeared in The Fantastic Four #1 (November 1961). Susan Storm is a founding member of the Fantastic Four and was the first female superhero published by Marvel during the Silver Age of Comic Books.

Invisible Woman is the superhero persona of Dr. Susan "Sue" Storm-Richards, who received her powers after being exposed to a cosmic storm. After being brainwashed at some point, she decides to change her identity from then onward to reflect a more confident version of herself. As a human mutate, she possesses two powers: invisibility and force fields. Her invisibility power deals with bending light waves and allows her to render herself and other objects invisible. She can also project powerful fields of invisible psionic, hyperspace-based energy that she uses for a variety of offensive and defensive effects, including shields, blasts, explosions, and levitation. Sue plays a central role in the lives of her hot-headed younger brother Johnny Storm, her brilliant husband Reed Richards, her close friend Ben Grimm, and her children (Franklin and Valeria). She was also romantically attracted to Namor the Sub-Mariner for a time.

Invisible Woman has been described as one of Marvel's most notable and powerful female heroes.

Invisible Woman was portrayed by Rebecca Staab in the unreleased 1994 film The Fantastic Four, Jessica Alba in the 2005 film Fantastic Four and its 2007 sequel Fantastic Four: Rise of the Silver Surfer, Kate Mara in the 2015 film Fantastic Four, and Vanessa Kirby in the Marvel Cinematic Universe film The Fantastic Four: First Steps (2025), who will reprise the role in Avengers: Doomsday (2026) and Avengers: Secret Wars (2027).

== Publication history ==
Created by writer Stan Lee and artist/co-writer Jack Kirby, the character first appeared in The Fantastic Four #1 (November 1961). The character was originally named Invisible Girl.

Since Stan Lee wanted The Fantastic Four to be driven by familial connections rather than action, the primary impetus for Susan Storm's creation was to not only be a full member of the team, but also the female lead (with Reed Richards a.k.a. Mister Fantastic being the male lead) of the series. He eventually emphasized this to readers explicitly, with a story in which the Fantastic Four read fan mail denigrating the Invisible Girl's value to the team, and respond by enumerating some of the occasions on which she played a key role in their victories. Teammate Johnny Storm a.k.a. the Human Torch being Sue's little brother became one of several sources of tension within the group, and she also served as the center of a love triangle with Reed and the Fantastic Four's sometime ally, sometime enemy Namor. Sue was initially presented as the sole reason for Ben Grimm, a bad guy, remaining on the group, which was significantly toned down in the published series.

Lee did not want Sue to have super strength, "to be Wonder Woman and punch people", so eventually he came to invisibility, inspired by works such as Universal Pictures' The Invisible Man. His original two-page plot summary for the first issue of The Fantastic Four, reprinted in the Marvel Masterworks and Marvel Epic Collection editions of the first ten issues, handled Susan's powers similarly to The Invisible Man, which required her to take off her clothes, but noting concern that that might be "too sexy" for a comic book. It also noted that she could not turn visible again, and would wear a mask recreating her face when she wanted to be seen. By the time the first issue was written and drawn, both elements had changed: Susan could turn invisible and visible at will, and doing so affected the visibility of whatever clothing she was wearing.

Invisible Woman has primarily appeared in issues of Fantastic Four. In issue #22 (January 1964), the creators expanded Sue's abilities, giving her the powers to render other objects and people invisible and create strong force fields and psionic blasts. Under John Byrne's authorship, Sue became more confident and assertive in her abilities, which became more versatile and impressive. She finds she can use her force field abilities to manipulate matter through the air, immobilize enemies, or administer long-range attacks. Susan changed her nom de guerre to Invisible Woman, adopting the name in Fantastic Four #284, which was published in 1985.

In April 2019, Marvel Comics announced that it would publish Sue Storm's first solo miniseries, Invisible Woman. It was written by Mark Waid, drawn by Mattia De Iulis with covers by Adam Hughes. It was later confirmed by Tom Brevoort, editor at Marvel Comics, that the miniseries was produced for trademark purposes.

== Fictional character biography ==
As detailed in The Marvel Saga: Official History of The Marvel Universe #16, Susan Storm, and her younger brother, Jonathan grew up in the town of Glenville, Long Island, children of the physician Franklin Storm and his wife Mary. The parents left their kids alone one night to travel to a dinner honoring Dr. Storm. On the way, a tire blew out and Mary was injured. Franklin escaped injury and insisted on operating on his wife. He was unable to save her. After his wife's death, Dr. Franklin Storm became a gambler and a drunk, losing his medical practice, which led him to the accidental killing of a loan shark. Franklin did not defend himself in court, because he still felt guilty over Mary's death. With their father in prison, Susan had to become a mother figure for her younger brother.

While living with her aunt, Susan, at the young age of 17, met her future husband, Reed Richards, a house guest who was attending college. When she graduated from high school as the award-winning captain of her Girls' Varsity Swim Team, she moved to California to attend college, where she pursued an acting career and encountered Richards again. They began to become romantically involved with each other.

Reed Richards, working in the field of aerospace engineering, was designing a spacecraft for interstellar travel. Everything was going well until the government stopped the funding of his project. Richards, wanting to see his project through, decided to make an unscheduled test flight. It was only going to be Reed and his best friend, Ben Grimm, involved, but Susan was instrumental in persuading Reed in letting her brother and herself join them on the dangerous space mission. In space, the quartet was exposed to massive amounts of cosmic radiation. As a result, they had to abort the mission and return to Earth. After the crash landing, they realized that they gained superhuman powers; hers was the ability to become invisible at will. Realizing the potential use of their abilities, the four of them became the Fantastic Four, for the benefit of mankind. Susan adopted the code name Invisible Girl.

=== Invisible Girl ===
As the Fantastic Four, the team set up their first headquarters in the Baxter Building in Manhattan. The Fantastic Four encounter many villains in the early part of their career, but none of them contend for Susan's affections more than Namor the Sub-Mariner. Sue feels an amount of attraction to Namor, but her heart belongs with Reed, a situation that has been called the Marvel Universe's first love triangle.

Initially, her powers are limited to making herself invisible. However, before long Sue discovers she can make other things invisible as well as create force fields of invisible energy. After Susan is injured in battle with the Mole Man, her father escapes from prison and operates on her to save her life. Franklin makes amends with his children before returning to prison; however, the Super-Skrull finds a way to kidnap Dr. Storm, mimic his appearance, and then fight the Fantastic Four as the Invincible Man. In the process of defeating the Super-Skrull, Dr. Storm sacrifices his own life to protect the Fantastic Four from a Skrull booby trap.

Reed and Sue's relationship progresses, with the two of them deciding to get married. The wedding is the event of the century, with several of New York City's preeminent superheroes in attendance. Not long after that, Sue and the Fantastic Four encounter Galactus and the Silver Surfer. Sue later becomes pregnant with her first child. As a result, she takes time off as an active member of the team. Johnny's girlfriend, the Inhuman elementalist Crystal, joins the team, taking over Susan's roster spot.

Susan's cosmic ray irradiated blood cells serve as an obstacle for her in carrying the unborn child to term. Knowing this, Reed, Johnny, and Ben journey into the Negative Zone to acquire the Cosmic Control Rod from Annihilus. Effectively utilizing the device, the baby is safely delivered and is named Franklin, in memory of Susan and Johnny's father. Due to the genetically altered structure of his parents, Franklin is a mutant, possessing vast powers. Seeking to use the boy's talents for his own sadistic purposes, Annihilus triggers a premature full release of Franklin's latent abilities, which were already in the process of gradual emergence. Fearing that his son could release enough psionic energy to eliminate all life on Earth, Reed shuts down Franklin's mind. Angry with Reed for not seeking her input in the matter, Susan leaves the Fantastic Four and has a marital separation from Reed. Medusa of the Inhumans takes her roster spot. With the help of Namor, Susan reconciles with Reed and returns to the Fantastic Four accompanied by Franklin.

=== Invisible Woman ===
Susan eventually becomes pregnant for a second time. However, this second child is stillborn due to Susan having been exposed to radiation inside the Negative Zone. A depressed Susan is manipulated by Psycho-Man into becoming Malice, the Mistress of Hate. As Malice, Susan attacks her friends and family in the Fantastic Four, utilizing her abilities at power levels she had never displayed previously. Reed saves Susan by forcing her to hate him legitimately. Susan (off-panel) does something to Psycho-Man, causing him to let out a terrifying scream. After she rejoins her teammates, Susan states that Psycho-Man will never hurt anyone ever again. Susan is profoundly affected by the entire episode, and changes her code name from "Invisible Girl" to "Invisible Woman". Along with Reed, she briefly leaves the Fantastic Four and joins the Avengers. The two of them rejoin the Fantastic Four before long.

During the Infinity War, Susan faces off against Malice, who has reemerged in her subconscious. Susan absorbs Malice into her own consciousness. Subsequently, Susan's personality is influenced by Malice, causing her to become more aggressive in battle, even creating invisible razor-like force fields she uses to slice enemies. Her son Franklin, who has traveled forward and back in time, becomes the adult hero Psi-Lord, frees his mother, and absorbs the influence of Malice into himself. He eventually defeats Malice by projecting her into the mind of the Dark Raider, an insane alternate universe counterpart of Reed Richards who later dies in the Negative Zone.

After the apparent death of Reed, Susan becomes a capable leader. Susan keeps searching for Reed, feeling he is still alive, despite romantic advances from her old flame, Namor the Sub-Mariner. The Fantastic Four eventually rescue the time-displaced Reed, who finds himself temporarily losing confidence in his leadership skills, since Susan is also a capable leader.

Following their return to their Earth of origin, the Fantastic Four encounter Valeria von Doom. This new Marvel Girl came from an alternate future, where she was the child of Susan and Doctor Doom. Susan eventually comes to accept the young girl as a friend. During a conflict with Abraxas, Franklin reveals that he used his abilities to save Susan's original stillborn child and place it in another alternate future. After the ordeal involving Abraxas, Marvel Girl is restored to a baby again inside Susan's womb. Susan again has a difficult birthing. Due to the help of Doctor Doom, Susan gives birth to a healthy baby girl, which Doom names Valeria, his price for helping Sue. Doom places a spell on the baby, which makes her his familiar spirit, to be used against the Fantastic Four. The Fantastic Four wrestle Valeria free from Doom's control and defeat him.

=== Sue, the Human Torch ===
Zius, leader of a group of Galactus refugees, kidnaps Susan. His intent was to use her powers to hide planets from Galactus. Reed finds a way to fool Zius, by switching Susan and Johnny's powers. Susan assists in an adventure where Johnny becomes a herald of Galactus. Wielding a cosmic version of her powers, Johnny is able to see through people to the very cores of their personality.

Both Sue and Johnny gain a newfound respect for each other and how they deal with their powers. Soon, Reed tries to switch the powers back. The entire FF's powers are granted to four random civilians before being restored to their rightful wielders.

This parallels an earlier torture by Doom, where Sue was given an extremely painful version of Johnny's pyrokinetic ability.

=== Anti-registration movement ===
During the 2006–07 storyline "Civil War", which takes place in the aftermath of an explosion in a residential neighborhood in Stamford, Connecticut, and prompting calls for the government to register people with superhuman abilities, Sue's brother Johnny is beaten up by locals angered by his celebrity superhero status. Although Sue is initially part of the pro-registration side supporting the Superhuman Registration Act, she defects after Ragnarok, a clone of Thor created by her husband Mister Fantastic and Tony Stark, kills Bill Foster. Sue leaves the Baxter Building, informing Reed via a note that their children are in his care, as she intends to join Captain America's underground resistance force. Her final injunction to her husband is a heartfelt request: "Please fix this."

The Storm siblings narrowly escape a team of S.H.I.E.L.D. agents bent on capturing them in Civil War #5. The two further elude detection by operating under fake husband and wife identities provided by Nick Fury, becoming members of Captain America's Secret Avengers. Before storming the Negative Zone prison, Sue visits Namor to plead for assistance. He refuses and indicates she is still attracted to him, an accusation she does not deny.

During the final battle depicted in Civil War #7, as Susan is nearly shot by Taskmaster, but Reed Richards jumps in front of her and takes the brunt of the attack, sustaining a major injury. Outraged, Susan beats Taskmaster into the ground. Following the end of the war, Susan helps with the clean-up of New York City. She and the other Secret Avengers are granted amnesty, and she returns home to Reed. Seeking to repair the damage done to their marriage as a result of the war, Sue and Reed take time off from the Fantastic Four, but ask Storm and the Black Panther to take their places in the meantime.

=== World War Hulk ===
In the second issue of World War Hulk, the Fantastic Four confront the Hulk. Reed has designed a machine that recreates the Sentry's aura. The Hulk, only momentarily calmed, discovers the ruse. Sue deploys her force fields to defend Reed against the Hulk, who shatters her protective fields with such force that she collapses, leaving Reed vulnerable. Reed suffers a vicious beating at the hands of the Hulk; Sue telephones the Sentry for help.

The Hulk transforms Madison Square Garden into a gladiatorial arena. Sue and the other defeated heroes are held captive in a lower level. The heroes are outfitted with the same obedience disks that were used to suppress the Hulk's powers and force him to fight his companions on Sakaar.

=== Death ===
Some time after World War Hulk, but before Secret Invasion, the Richards family has hired a new nanny for their kids, Tabitha Deneuve. At the same time, a mysterious new group, calling themselves the New Defenders, commits robberies, and one of their members, Psionics, starts a relationship with Johnny. After a bad break-up, Johnny is kidnapped by the Defenders, along with Doctor Doom and Galactus, to power a massive machine that is designed to apparently save the people of the future 500 years from now, a plan orchestrated by Tabitha, who is revealed to be Susan Richards from 500 years in the future. Eventually, the present Fantastic Four are able to save both the present Earth and the future Earth by sending the future inhabitants to the Earth Trust's private duplicate Nu-Earth, but after freeing Doctor Doom, the future Sue goes to apologize to him and is electrocuted by Doom.

=== Secret Invasion: Fantastic Four ===
While Susan is on a lecture tour in Vancouver, British Columbia, a Skrull posing as Mister Fantastic ambushes her, applying pressure to her skull with an invisible force field and knocking her unconscious. Then, a Skrull infiltrates the Baxter Building disguised as Susan and opens a portal into the Negative Zone, forcing the top three floors of the building into the Negative Zone, and in turn trapping herself, Johnny, Ben, and the two Richards children there. The Skrull impersonating her is later revealed to be Johnny's ex-wife Lyja, who once infiltrated the Fantastic Four by impersonating Ben Grimm's love interest Alicia Masters. The real Susan Richards is recovered alive from a downed Skrull ship after the final battle of the invasion.

=== Future Foundation ===
Reed started the Future Foundation for the benefit of the world and for science. When the Human Torch died, the Fantastic Four was dissolved and Sue's heroic exploits were moved entirely under the banner of the Future Foundation. It is later revealed that Johnny was revived and is still alive.

=== Secret Wars ===
Sue and the rest of the Fantastic Four create a life raft that will save them from the coming death of the universe. However, right before the final incursion between their universe and the Ultimate Universe, Sue's part of the ship becomes separated. Reed and Black Panther plan to get her ship back, with Sue holding her part together with her force field. However, the death of the universe proves too much, even for her, and she, Ben, and her children die at the hands of Oblivion, with Reed screaming in agony at the death of his wife and children. Captain Marvel tells him they need to go, and they leave Sue's destroyed part of the ship behind.

When Molecule Man transfers his power to Reed, Reed used it to resurrect his family including Sue, and they began to rebuild the multiverse.

== Powers and abilities ==
The Invisible Woman received her powers after cosmic radiation had triggered mutagenic changes in her body. Originally only able to turn herself invisible, Sue later discovered she could render other things invisible as well and project an invisible force field. It has been said on numerous occasions, including by the Fantastic Four's greatest opponent, Doctor Doom, that Susan Storm is the most powerful member of the quartet and one of the few beings able to rupture the shell of a Celestial.

=== Invisibility ===
As the Invisible Woman, Susan can render herself wholly or partially invisible at will by bending light around her. She can also render other people or objects fully or partially invisible too, affecting up to 40,000 cubic feet (1,100 m^{3}) of volume. According to the Women of Marvel: Celebrating Seven Decades Handbook, Sue's retinas don't function conventionally and instead of just registering objects using reflected light, the retinas in Sue's eyes also interpolate shapes based on reflected cosmic rays, which in the Marvel Universe are always present in the atmosphere, granted usually only in small concentrations. This anomaly apparently allows her to perceive invisible people and objects, though she does not see them in color since the cosmic-ray reflections bypass her eyes' rods and cones; her vision may also be monochromatic when she herself is invisible since her eyes do not reflect light in that state, though she otherwise seems to possess a full range of vision while she is invisible. She can also sense people or objects made invisible by scientific means, and can restore them to a visible state at will.

=== Force-field projection ===
Sue can also mentally generate a field of invisible psionic force (drawn from hyperspace), which she is able to manipulate for a variety of effects. For example, Sue can shape her fields into simple invisible constructs or generate a nearly indestructible invisible force field around herself or her target. She can vary the texture and tensile strength of her field to some extent, rendering it rigid as steel or as soft and yielding as foam rubber; softer variants on the field enable her to cushion impacts more gently, and are less likely to result in psionic backlash against Susan herself. She is also able to make her shields opaque or translucent like milk glass to effectively block variations of light such as laser beams, even using her shields to block out the sun for days at a time. She can make them semipermeable to filter oxygen from water though the latter is mentally taxing. She can generate solid force constructs as small as a marble or as large as 100 feet (30 m) in diameter, and her hollow projections such as domes can extend up to several miles in area.

By generating additional force behind her psionic constructs, Sue can turn them into offensive weapons, ranging from massive invisible battering rams to small projectiles such as spheres and darts. By forming one of her force fields within an object and expanding the field, Sue can cause her target to explode. She can also travel atop her animated constructs, enabling her to simulate a limited approximation of levitation or flight. She can manipulate the energy of her force fields around other objects to simulate telekinetic abilities as well. She is capable of generating and manipulating multiple psionic force fields simultaneously.

Sue's force fields can also counteract or interact with other forms of psychic energy. For instance, when battling against Psi-Lord, an adult version of her own son, her force fields shielded her mind from his telepathic abilities. Similarly, Jean Grey's psychokinetic abilities could not pass through her shields.

=== Miscellaneous abilities ===
Susan is a skilled swimmer and unarmed combatant, having been trained in judo by Mister Fantastic and received additional coaching from Iron Fist, the Thing, and She-Hulk.

== Cultural impact and legacy ==
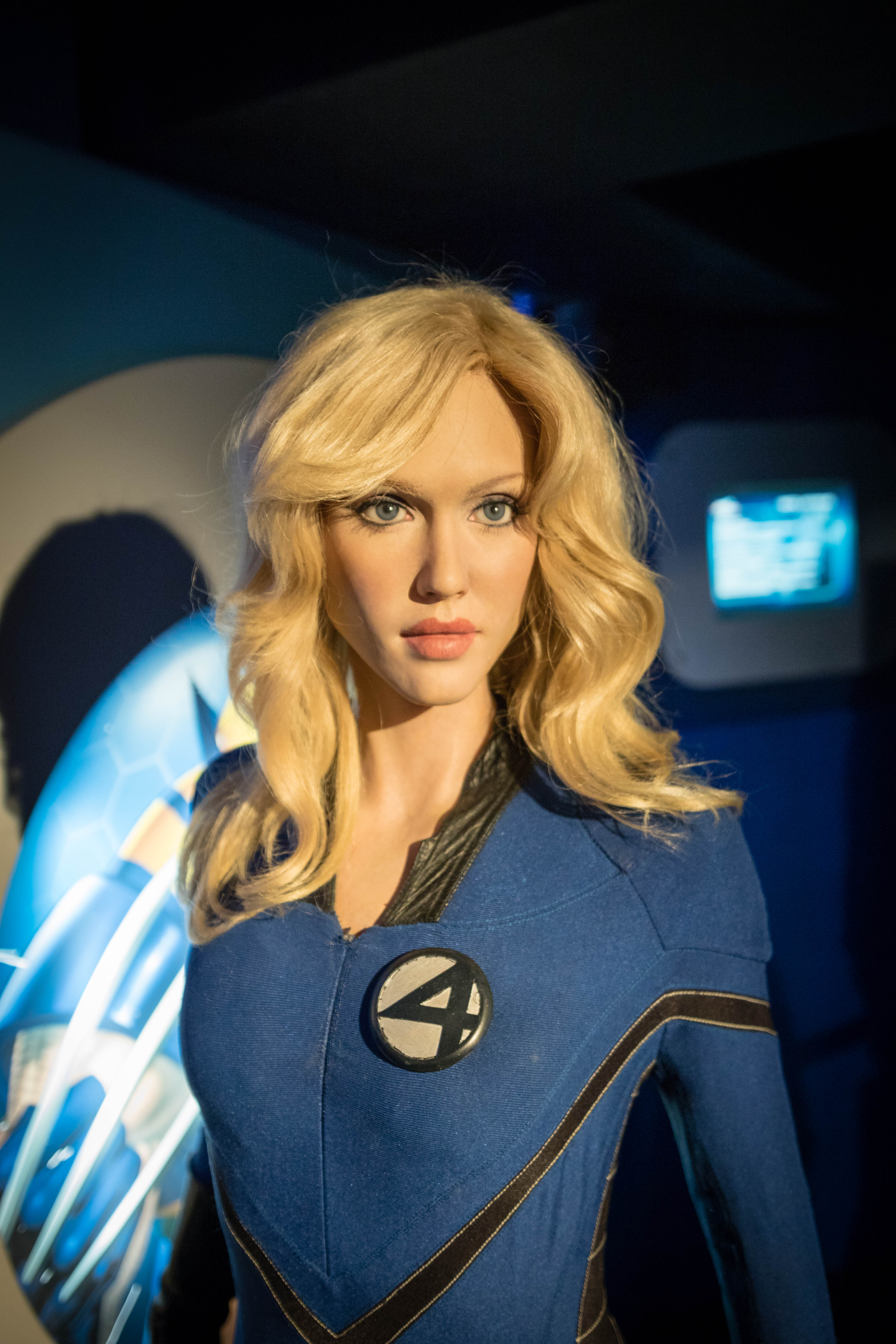
Susan Storm wax sculpture at Madame Tussauds London

=== Critical reception ===
George Marston of Newsarama referred to the Invisible Woman as one of the "best female superheroes of all time", writing, "Marvel's first superheroine (debuting 60 years ago this year in Fantastic Four #1) may not have the highest profile of the characters on this list, but Sue Storm set the pace for modern female heroes – and still occupies a fairly unique place in comic books. While it's true that early stories didn't exactly serve Sue particularly well, she developed into the heart and soul of the Fantastic Four, serving as Marvel's first family's de facto – and literal – mother. And that may be one of the most crucial aspects of her character. While Sue Storm is powerful in her own right – many writers have said she's got the most raw power of anyone on the FF – she also represents an important aspect of womanhood that many female heroes have sacrificed or had used against them – motherhood. That Sue can serve as one of the most respected heroes in the Marvel Universe (and its first female hero) while simultaneously raising two children and shepherding the growth of many more through the Future Foundation can't be understated. Plus, it takes a pretty amazing woman to stand up to a blowhard like Reed Richards." Garrett Martin of Paste called the Invisible Woman one of the characters who "hold a special place within the Marvel Universe and the hearts of its fans," stating, "Of the original team, Sue Storm has grown the most, by far, since Fantastic Four #1. Not only was her official superhero name the Invisible Girl, even after getting married and having a child, but she was basically written like the typical early Marvel love interest, despite having powers. She was too demure, too squeamish and not always competent enough to feel like a true superhero. That's changed so much that she's basically the strongest member of the team today, emotionally, morally and in terms of her superpowers. That says a lot about how cultural perceptions of the role of women have shifted since 1961, and also about how Marvel, as a company, has never been afraid to reexamine its characters when the larger story demands it." Brett White of CBR.com described the Invisible Woman one of Marvel's "classic characters worthy of ongoing attention," saying, "Since debuting in 1961, Sue Storm has played a pivotal role in the Marvel Universe without ever having even a single limited series to her name, unlike her brother the Human Torch or the Thing, as both have had a few series, ongoing and mini, between them. As both Marvel Comics' literal first lady and the Marvel Universe's spiritual first lady, Sue Storm enjoys a level of prominence and importance that could prove to be fascinating material for a series. Turn Sue Storm into the Michelle Obama of the Marvel hero community. Make her inspiring and proactive; have her spearhead outreach opportunities to those in need, and have her go on diplomatic missions in hostile territories. Jonathan Hickman played with a lot of these ideas in his "Fantastic Four" run, and it's time someone continued those stories." IGN named the Invisible Woman one of the "greatest Avengers of all time", asserting, "Invisible Woman is much more closely associated with the Fantastic Four than the Avengers, but that's not to say she won't answer the call alongside the rest of Earth's Mightiest Heroes when necessary. Sue often tends to serve as the heart and soul of any team she serves on. Her power to manipulate invisible force fields arguably makes her the strongest of the FF. But despite that power she remains firmly grounded in the real world. She keeps her dysfunctional family in order, whether it's dragging her husband and daughter out of the lab or making her hotshot brother act his age. Sue is a matriarch who isn't at all afraid to kick some ass when the situation calls for it. And the Avengers' villains have come to realize that every bit as much as Doctor Doom or Galactus."

Gavia Baker-Whitelaw of The Daily Dot called the Invisible Woman one of the "best female superheroes of all time", asserting, "Sue Storm, aka the Invisible Woman, is an icon of the Marvel Universe. She rarely appears as a solo character. As a key member of the Fantastic Four, her superpowers include invisibility and the ability to create force fields. In some ways, her characterization plays into traditional gender roles. As Mr. Fantastic's wife and Johnny Storm's sister, she can be overshadowed by her male teammates. Her powers are often interpreted as passive because they're more attuned to protection than aggressive combat. Several of her storylines involve unwanted romantic attention from characters like Dr. Doom. This all adds up to her being a rather divisive character. It would undoubtedly help if Marvel hired a female writer to explore her character for a new audience." Joshua Isaak of Screen Rant described the Invisible Woman as "Marvel's first major female superhero", stating, "Marvel's Fantastic Four is undoubtedly the series that defined the company - but unfortunately Stan Lee completely botched writing for Marvel's first major female superhero, Susan Storm. Today, the character is famous for being a scientific genius, astronaut, and the strongest member of the team (with her ability to use her powerful invisible force fields in a variety of offensive and defensive ways). But for the first few years of the Fantastic Four, Sue was little more than a collection of 1960s stereotypes - the worst the decade had to offer. [...] Stan Lee found it necessary to constantly remind readers that Susan Storm was a woman (even though her superhero name remained Invisible Girl all the way until Fantastic Four #280 in 1985!). Sue would create a version of her suit with a miniskirt, try on different looks in the mirror ("A girl is a girl" reads the caption above Sue trying on a black wig), and even decide to do housecleaning while the men lounged about after a battle. Thankfully, this wouldn't last; Sue not only became a key player in superhero battles but would regularly call out Reed's arrogance and superiority whenever he would insult her for being too "emotional" (which was distressingly often). In many ways, Sue was progressive for the time - many female characters in comics were relegated to love interests and rarely participated in battles at all. But as revolutionary as he was, Stan Lee couldn't help but rely on outdated tropes while writing for Sue. Today, the Invisible Woman is a powerful and respected member of the Fantastic Four, and the early issues - however stereotypical - led to the Susan Storm known and loved by the Marvel faithful worldwide." Stephanie Williams of Syfy stated, "The core four members of the Fantastic Four are a package deal. It's challenging to think of one of them without the other. However, we're going to do just that. Each member is unique in their own right, especially Sue Storm. She's a character that has been around for almost 60 years, making her first leap onto the silver screen by way of Jessica Alba in the 2005 live-action Fantastic Four. This year marks the 15th anniversary of that early-aughts attempt at the iconic foursome. While it's not a movie that's high on many comic book movie lists, Jessica's Sue does a reasonably strong job encapsulating a character with such a long history on the page, especially if you just ignore the dye job. Sue can be as hot-headed as her brother, if not more. She is always looking for smoke and absolutely deserves better than what Mr. Stretch can offer. The MCU provides a chance to introduce her in ways that highlight this amazing individual separate from her teammates in Fantastic Four." Laura Kelly of The Mary Sue wrote, "None of the movies we've gotten could ever figure out what to do with Sue. Too many times, the focus would land on Reed Richards and his science experiments, or the comic relief of the Thing and the Human Torch. Sue was usually reduced to one character trait: girl. Admittedly, this was also a major problem in Sue Storm's early comic book portrayal, and it was an uphill slog for her to get some real character development. And out of the four, Sue has ultimately gone through the most growth and has come out on the other side as probably the most powerful member of the team. [...] For an MCU remake, Sue Storm absolutely should be a scientist, but she needs to be a human being, too. First, Sue should not only be an active participant, but she should be Reed's scientific equal. They should be working together on experiments and research and be actual contemporaries. In the comics, Sue is the glue that keeps the team together. Without her, the team would have fallen apart long ago. And that's not an easy job. Sue has had to deal with Reed's absent-mindedness (and dickishness), Johnny's recklessness, and Ben's temper, not to mention all the various infighting (physical and otherwise) that regularly breaks out. She's had to be practical and grounded, but also sensitive and empathetic. That's a lot of pressure on one person. Delving into that part of Sue's psyche would make her a much more interesting, complex character."

=== Accolades ===
- In 2011, Wizard ranked the Invisible Woman 99th in their "Top 200 comic book characters" list.
- In 2011, IGN ranked the Invisible Woman 66th in their "Top 100 comic book heroes" list.
- In 2011, Comics Buyer's Guide ranked the Invisible Woman 85th in their "100 Sexiest Women in Comics" list.
- In 2012, IGN ranked the Invisible Woman 40th in their "Top 50 Avengers" list.
- In 2015, Entertainment Weekly ranked the Invisible Woman 75th in their "Let's rank every Avenger ever" list.
- In 2017, The Daily Dot ranked the Invisible Woman 27th in their "Top 33 female superheroes of all time" list.
- In 2018, Paste ranked the Invisible Woman 2nd in their "20 Members of the Fantastic Four" list.
- In 2020, Scary Mommy included the Invisible Woman in their "Looking For A Role Model? These 195+ Marvel Female Characters Are Truly Heroic" list.
- In 2021, CBR.com ranked the Invisible Woman 6th in their "Marvel: The 10 Strongest Female Humans" list and 8th in their "10 Strongest Characters From Fantastic Four Comics" list.
- In 2021, Screen Rant ranked the Invisible Woman 2nd in their "10 Most Powerful Members Of The Fantastic Four" list.
- In 2022, Newsarama ranked the Invisible Woman 5th in their "Best female superheroes" list.
- In 2022, Bustle ranked the Invisible Woman 21st in their "35 Best Female Marvel Characters Who Dominate The MCU & Comics" list.
- In 2022, CBR.com ranked the Invisible Woman 2nd in their "10 Most Powerful Members Of The Fantastic Four" list and 10h in their "Marvel's 10 Best Infiltrators" list.
- In 2022, Screen Rant ranked the Invisible Woman 5th in their "10 Most Powerful Members Of The Lady Liberators" list and included her in their "10 Female Marvel Heroes That Should Come To The MCU" list.

== Literary reception ==
=== Volumes ===
==== Captain Universe / Invisible Woman - 2005 ====
According to Diamond Comic Distributors, Captain Universe / Invisible Woman #1 was the 111th best selling comic book in November 2005.

==== Invisible Woman - 2020 ====
According to Diamond Comic Distributors, the Invisible Woman trade paperback was the 72nd best selling graphic novel in January 2020.

===== Issue 1 =====
According to Diamond Comic Distributors, Invisible Woman #1 was the 15th best selling comic book in July 2019.

Joe Grunenwald of ComicsBeat stated, "The artwork from De Iulis throughout the issue was exceptional. His work first came to my attention on the digital Jessica Jones series, even if it was a little 'house style-y' for me, so it's nice to see him having evolved more or less past that into his own unique look with this series. I particularly appreciated the way his coloring represented Sue's abilities. The opening sequence and the effect of the snow on a pair of invisible people was also something I've never seen done with Sue before from both a story and a visual standpoint. [...] I was enthusiastic about this book from the jump and it didn't disappoint me. Sue Richards is such a rich character, and it's great to see her have a chance to shine in the hands of a seasoned writer and an artist who's really coming into his own. Invisible Woman #1 gets a BUY from me with no hesitation." Jesse Schedeen of IGN gave Invisible Woman #1 a grade of 6.5 out of 10, saying, "De Iulis' art packs a unique punch, at least. De Iulis' lines are sleek and sharply rendered, with expressive facial work helping to heighten the emotion in any given scene. The vibrant colors are the book's real standout element. Invisible Woman has a painterly aesthetic that makes it look unlike anything else Marvel is publishing. Whether this is truly the best look for an espionage-focused superhero comic is another question. As eye-catching as the art is, it also tends to be a little too clean and pretty to reflect the grungy surroundings in which Sue and friends are operating. Invisible Woman seems like an easy sell at first glance. It features the return of Mark Waid to a franchise he does better than almost anyone, along with a new take on an old heroine and a snazzy art style. Those element don't coalesce into an effective whole in issue #1, however. The story lags once it shifts to the presents, and the art is perhaps too pretty for the subject matter."

===== Issue 2 =====
According to Diamond Comic Distributors, Invisible Woman #2 was the 81st best selling comic book in August 2019.

Jamie Lovett of ComicBook.com gave Invisible Woman #2 a grade of 4 out of 5, stating, "The second issue of Invisible Woman does a better job of making a case for its own existence than the first. The themes are clearer, as Mark Waid shows the assumptions made about Invisible Woman as a wife and mother being incapable of carrying her weight in the field. Waid also does a great job of coming up with scenarios for Sue to use her powers in unconventional ways, and Mattia de Iulis draws it all with a soft line that fits the stories tone and pace without skimping on some great big action moments. A marked improvement over the debut issue."

== In other media ==
=== Television ===
- Invisible Woman appears in Fantastic Four (1967), voiced by Jo Ann Pflug.
- Invisible Woman appears in The New Fantastic Four, voiced by Ginny Tyler.
- Invisible Woman appears in Fantastic Four (1994), voiced by Lori Alan. This version was already married to Reed Richards when the titular group got their powers, and temporarily becomes Malice.
- Invisible Woman appears in the Spider-Man: The Animated Series three-part episode "Secret Wars", voiced by Gail Matthius.
- Invisible Woman appears in Fantastic Four: World's Greatest Heroes, voiced by Lara Gilchrist. This version is not married to Reed Richards.
- Invisible Woman appears in The Super Hero Squad Show, voiced by Tara Strong.
- Invisible Woman appears in The Avengers: Earth's Mightiest Heroes, voiced by Erin Torpey.
- Invisible Woman appears in the Hulk and the Agents of S.M.A.S.H. episode "Monsters No More", voiced by Kari Wahlgren.
- Invisible Woman appears in Marvel Super Hero Adventures, voiced by Lauren Emily Jackson.
- Invisible Woman appears in Lego Marvel Avengers: Mission Demolition, voiced by Vanessa Marshall.

=== Film ===
Jessica Alba as Sue Storm in Fantastic Four (2005).

- Invisible Woman appears in The Fantastic Four (1994), portrayed by Rebecca Staab.
- Invisible Woman appears in Fantastic Four (2005), portrayed by Jessica Alba. This version is the head of Von Doom Industries' Department of Genetic Research who initially dates company CEO Victor von Doom before breaking up with him. Additionally, her abilities are partially influenced by her emotions.
  - Alba reprises the role in Fantastic Four: Rise of the Silver Surfer. By this time, she and Reed Richards are engaged.
- Invisible Woman appears in Fantastic Four (2015), portrayed by Kate Mara. This version is Kosovan and the adopted daughter of Franklin Storm. She, along with the rest of the Fantastic Four, obtained her powers from a botched expedition to a parallel dimension called "Planet Zero".
- Invisible Woman appears in the Marvel Cinematic Universe (MCU) film The Fantastic Four: First Steps, portrayed by Vanessa Kirby.
  - Kirby is set to reprise the role in the MCU films Avengers: Doomsday and Avengers: Secret Wars.

=== Video games ===
- Invisible Woman appears as an assist character in Spider-Man (1995).
- Invisible Woman appears in Fantastic Four (1997).
- Invisible Woman appears in Fantastic Four (2005), voiced by Jessica Alba. Additionally, her "classic" design appears in bonus levels, voiced by Grey DeLisle.
- Invisible Woman, based on Jessica Alba's portrayal, appears in Fantastic Four: Rise of the Silver Surfer, voiced by Erin Matthews.
- Invisible Woman appears as a playable character in Marvel: Ultimate Alliance, voiced by Danica McKellar.
- Invisible Woman appears as a playable character in Marvel: Ultimate Alliance 2, voiced again by Danica McKellar. Additionally, her Ultimate Marvel design appears as an alternate skin.
- Invisible Woman appears as a playable character in the Marvel Super Hero Squad and Marvel Super Hero Squad: The Infinity Gauntlet, voiced again by Tara Strong.
- Invisible Woman appears as a playable character in Marvel Super Hero Squad Online, voiced again by Grey DeLisle.
- Invisible Woman appears in LittleBigPlanet via the "Marvel Costume Kit 3" DLC.
- Invisible Woman appears as a playable character in Marvel Super Hero Squad: Comic Combat, voiced again by Tara Strong.
- Invisible Woman appears in Pinball FX 2, voiced by Laura Bailey.
- Invisible Woman appears as a playable character in Marvel: Avengers Alliance.
- Invisible Woman initially appeared as a playable character in Marvel Heroes before she was removed on July 1, 2017 for legal reasons.
- Invisible Woman appears as a playable character in Lego Marvel Super Heroes, voiced by Danielle Nicolet.
- Invisible Woman appears as a playable character in Marvel: Future Fight.
- Invisible Woman appears as a playable character in Marvel Puzzle Quest.
- Invisible Woman appears as a downloadable playable character in Marvel Ultimate Alliance 3: The Black Order via the "Shadow of Doom" DLC, voiced again by Kari Wahlgren.
- Invisible Woman appears as a playable character in Marvel Super War.
- Invisible Woman appears as a downloadable playable character in Marvel Rivals, voiced by Suzie Yeung. Additionally, Malice appears as an alternate skin.
- Invisible Woman appears in Fortnite as part of a The Fantastic Four: First Steps promotional bundle.

=== Miscellaneous ===
Invisible Woman appears in the BBC radio adaptation of the Spider Man comics, voiced by Lorelei King.
