= Mattie Franklin =

Mattie Franklin Spider-Woman
- Spider-Woman from Spider-Woman #18 (December 2000). Art by Bart Sears.

Publication information
- Publisher: Marvel Comics
- First appearance: As Martha "Mattie" Franklin: In shadow: The Spectacular Spider-Man #262; (October 1998); Full appearance: The Amazing Spider-Man #441; (November 1998); As Spider-Woman: The Amazing Spider-Man vol. 2 #5; (May 1999)
- Created by: John Byrne; Rafael Kayanan

In-story information
- Alter ego: Martha "Mattie" Franklin
- Species: Human mutate
- Team affiliations: New U Technologies; Loners
- Notable aliases: Spider-Woman
- Abilities: Superhuman strength, speed, agility, stamina and reflexes; Psionic spider legs and webbing; Ability to cling to solid surfaces; Precognitive "Spider Sense"; Flight at subsonic speeds; Bio-electricity projection; Mild telepathy

Spider-Woman (Martha "Mattie" Franklin) is a superhero appearing in American comic books published by Marvel Comics. Created by writer John Byrne and artist Rafael Kayanan, Mattie Franklin first appeared in The Spectacular Spider-Man #262 (October 1998). She is the adoptive daughter of the Daily Bugle publisher J. Jonah Jameson, whom she affectionately refers to as "uncle". She gained various superpowers after participating in a ceremony to give Norman Osborn wizard powers. Her admiration for Peter Parker / Spider-Man inspired her to become a superhero when he disappeared. Mattie Franklin is the third character who adopted the Spider-Woman codename.

Mattie Franklin / Spider-Woman made her cinematic debut in Sony's Spider-Man Universe film Madame Web (2024) and is portrayed by Celeste O'Connor.

== Publication history ==
=== 1990s ===
Mattie Franklin debuted in the shadows in The Spectacular Spider-Man #262 (October 1998). Her first full appearance was in The Amazing Spider-Man #441 (November 1998). She later appeared as Spider-Woman in The Amazing Spider-Man vol. 2 #5 (May 1999). The beginning of a three-part crossover led directly into the launch of her own Spider-Woman series. Like Spider-Woman volume 1, Spider-Woman volume 3 pitted the protagonist against macabre and grotesque villains, and featured a closing story arc in which she looks into a mirror and sees her own face shriveled down to skin and bones. As a running joke, Spider-Woman constantly changes costumes throughout the series, including a four-issue run (#2–5) in which she adopts a new costume every issue. However, sales were mediocre and the series was cancelled with issue #18 (December 2000).

=== 2000s ===
Mattie Franklin appeared in the 2001 Alias series. She returned after an almost two-year absence for a six-issue story. However, the character spends the entire story (save a three-page epilogue) in a semi-conscious state. Franklin was killed off in the 2010 event "Grim Hunt". She appeared in the 2016-2017 Silk series, where she was temporarily resurrected.

== Fictional character biography ==
Martha "Mattie" Franklin is a troubled youth who grew up with her father after her mother died. After overhearing a phone call between her father and Norman Osborn about The Gathering of Five, she takes her father's place during the Gathering and is endowed with the powers that Norman Osborn desired for himself.

Mattie Franklin's first Spider-Woman costume

During one of Spider-Man's temporary retirements, Mattie wears a near-identical costume and fills in for him. Franklin has long been an obsessive fan of Spider-Man who inspired her career as a superhero. This obsession is coupled with repressed romantic feelings for him, which she revealed during a state of delirium after suffering a head injury in battle. She is defeated by Shadrac, forcing Spider-Man to return to the costume and save her. After Spider-Man's return, she assumes the identity of Spider-Woman. Eventually Charlotte Witter, a villain also going by the name of Spider-Woman, attacks her and steals her powers. Mattie manages not only to reabsorb her own powers, but also to absorb the powers of all three previous Spider-Women.

Lonely from having only her constantly working father to live with, Franklin moves in with J. Jonah Jameson, a close friend of her father, and his wife Marla. They have Franklin (a straight-"A" student) enrolled in a private school, where a classmate, Cheryl, spots her using her powers and becomes her friend and biggest fan. During this time, the powers Franklin absorbed from previous Spider-Women begin returning to their original owners.

=== Alias ===
While on a first date, Mattie is slipped a date rape drug, which she is unable to resist since she has lost the toxin resistance she absorbed from Jessica Drew. A small-time drug dealer continually drugs Mattie and exploits her to produce a drug called Mutant Growth Hormone (MGH), as well as using her for prostitution. To keep her prisoner, he regularly doses her with psychoactive drugs. Private investigator Jessica Jones, with the help of Jessica Drew, rescues Mattie and returns her to the Jamesons. Mattie goes through counseling to get over her dependence on the drugs with which she was sedated.

=== Loners ===
After the events of Alias, Mattie had retired from being a superhero and became a private investigator. However, she dons the costume once more to track down the dealers who were selling the MGH, and follows them to Los Angeles, where she attends Excelsior meetings and pretends to quit using her powers. In reality, she is using the meetings to recruit a partner to help her. She is joined by Darkhawk and Ricochet, who keep their activities secret from the rest of the group.

The trio's involvement in the MGH ring bust is revealed when Ricochet's later break-in at a Fujikawa lab results in Lightspeed being grievously wounded by Hollow. The group is confronted by a woman leading armored guards and Delilah; they have come to reclaim Hollow. The matter is settled peacefully by Mickey Musashi; Mattie is frustrated about allowing the bad guys to leave. However, Mickey reminds her that she is undoing the damage for which she, Darkhawk, and Ricochet are responsible. It is revealed that another reason for her joining the support group was that she was secretly researching the Slingers. While over at Johnny's house she begins searching around, looking for evidence when she is caught by Johnny whom she sleeps with in order for him not to get suspicious. Afterwards, she privately contacts the father of Dusk, in which she confirmed that Ricochet has no knowledge of Cassie's whereabouts. Mattie and Johnny later arrive at Mickey's apartment, in which they learn about both Phil Urich and Chris fighting each other in Darkhawk armor. After defeating Urich, she learns about Urich also making a deal with Fumiko Fujikawa and decides to leave the support group, no longer trusting them, pointing out that they had forgotten about how to be heroes in trying to overcome their heroic pasts. Mattie also admits that she regrets sleeping with Ricochet.

=== The Gauntlet and Grim Hunt ===
In the storyline "Grim Hunt", Mattie is attacked by Ana Kravinoff and captured. She awakens long enough to tell fellow prisoner Madame Web to tell Spider-Man that what happened to her is not his fault and that she did not cry. She is then killed by Sasha Kravinoff as part of a sacrificial ritual to revive her stepson Vladimir. Madame Web expresses a great amount of grief before she is killed, tearfully comforting her and saying she was a fine Spider-Woman who saved lives.

=== The Clone Conspiracy ===
During the Dead No More: The Clone Conspiracy storyline, Mattie Franklin was among the people resurrected by Ben Reilly in cloned bodies. When the Carrion virus spreads among the clones, Spider-Man and Anna Maria Marconi arrive in an attempt to stop the spread. Silk holds the door back to prevent more infected hosts coming in. After Spider-Man sends out the Webware Emergency Signal, J. Jonah Jameson and Silk find Marla and Mattie dead.

== Powers and abilities ==
Mattie Franklin possesses a range of superhuman powers that she gained after participating in the Gathering of Five ceremony. She has superhuman strength, speed, agility, stamina, and reflexes. Mattie Franklin also possesses the ability to fly at subsonic speeds and psionic spider legs.

After a battle with Charlotte Witter, Mattie briefly lost her powers before regaining not only her own powers, but also those of Witter, the two previous Spider-Women, Jessica Drew and Julia Carpenter, and Madame Web. After a short time, Julia and Jessica regained their powers, which left Mattie with her original abilities and those of Charlotte Witter.

== Reception ==
Rachel Ulatowski of The Mary Sue stated Mattie Franklin has the most dark and tragic backstory of all Spider characters. Maham Arsalan of Comic Book Resources compared Mattie Franklin to Peter Parker and called her an unlucky character with a turbulent dark existence that can surprise fans, while Sam Stone dedicated an entire article exposing her "tragic fate." Liam McGuire of Screen Rant described the life of Mattie Franklin as one of the most tragic and "messed-up" ones a superhero can have.

== Other versions ==
=== Marvel Universe vs. The Avengers ===
An alternate version of Mattie Franklin appears in Marvel Universe vs. The Avengers.

=== MC2 ===
An alternate version of Mattie Franklin appears in MC2. Spider-Man pursued Norman Osborn sooner than he did in the main continuity, and therefore, interfering The Gathering of Five ceremony. Mattie flees with the artifacts needed, and later gained the gift of power.

=== Spider-Verse ===
An alternate version of Mattie Franklin makes a cameo appearance in Spider-Verse as a member of the Spider-Army.

== In other media ==
=== Film ===
Mattie Franklin appears in Madame Web, portrayed by Celeste O'Connor. This version is an affluent yet rebellious African American teenager who is estranged from her wealthy parents, who are busy with a project across the ocean. After being targeted by Ezekiel Sims, whose prophetic visions lead him to believe she might kill him in the future, Franklin is rescued by Cassie Webb, who eventually trains her in becoming a superhero.

=== Video games ===
- Mattie Franklin's Spider-Woman suit was intended to appear in Marvel Ultimate Alliance as an alternate skin for Jessica Drew / Spider-Woman. While it was replaced by Spider-Girl's suit, concept art for Franklin's suit is featured as unlockable content.
- Mattie Franklin / Spider-Woman appears as an unlockable playable character in Spider-Man Unlimited.

=== Merchandise ===
In 2022, Funko released a Mattie Franklin / Spider-Woman Funko Pop figure as part of the "Beyond Amazing" collection.

== Collected editions ==
Title	Material collected	Publication date	ISBN
Spider-Woman: There Can Only Be One!	Spider-Woman (vol. 3) #1–18	2001	
Alias: The Underneath	Alias #10, 16–21	June 2003	978-0-78511-165-8
The Loners: The Secret Lives of Super Heroes	The Loners #1–6	March 2008	978-0-78512-215-9
