= Darkhawk =

Fictional character

- Darkhawk #1

Publication information
- Publisher: Marvel Comics
- First appearance: Darkhawk #1 (March 1991)
- Created by: Tom DeFalco (writer); Mike Manley (artist)

In-story information
- Alter ego: Christopher "Chris" Powell
- Species: Human mutate
- Team affiliations: Loners; New Warriors; Project Pegasus; Secret Defenders; West Coast Avengers; The Fraternity of Raptors
- Notable aliases: The Powell, Falconer, Edge-Man
- Abilities: Energy blasts Energy shield Stargate creation Teleportation; Mysticism; FTL flight Night vision Claw cable Accelerated healing factor Superhuman strength, speed, reflexes, stamina, agility, durability, senses Adaptive metamorphosis Size alteration Weapon formation

Darkhawk (Christopher Powell) is a superhero appearing in American comic books published by Marvel Comics. The character first appeared in Darkhawk #1 (March 1991), and was created by writer Tom DeFalco and artist Mike Manley. The character appeared in a series of self-titled comics from 1991-1995, then recurred in several limited-run series and multi-title events in the years since. The character's origin is based on a link between a human character and an android from another dimension known as Null Space. The character has also appeared in non-speaking roles on television and video games.

== Development ==
Writer Tom DeFalco, spoke about the creation of the character stating, "If I remember correctly–and I may not–I wanted Marvel to keep introducing new teenage heroes because the majority of our newsstand audience were teenagers or pre-teens. How did Darkhawk originate? I used a rejected bible that I had once prepared for Archie Comic's The Fly as a starting point. I ran the proposal [past] Gruenwald and later submitted anonymously to Marvel's creative panel…who approved it I wanted to write it myself, but I just couldn't find the time… Besides Danny Fingeroth did a much better job than I could have and I still have forgiven him for that affront."

Co-creator Mike Manley also spoke about designing the character, "It's hard to remember in the fog of time but I remember Howard Mackie asking me if I wanted to try out. I vaguely remember seeing a drawing that looked like a hawk headed Egyptian type guy in the office. I thought it was by Broderick. Anyway I thought it was a mix of Captain Marvel and Spidey. The body replacement thing. My thinking was influenced by that 70's black Namor costume and the helmet would have a hawkish shape. The wings pop out so it wouldn't look as dumb as Hawkman. I love Kubert and he made anything work but since Darkhawk was an android battle suit I figured it could have different configurations. The hawk claw grapple also a weapon like Wolverines claws made sense. Honey I wasn't about all the teen stuff I hoped to do more space stuff. Which we only touched on before I left for DC. If I revisited the character today I still have ideas. But of course that is unlikely to happen since Marvel has never asked me to do anything with him since issue 25."

== Publication history ==
Darkhawk appeared in a self-titled monthly series for 50 issues that was published by Marvel Comics from March 1991 to March 1995, and included three standalone annuals. Although created by DeFalco and Manley, DeFalco was never credited as a writer of the series. The original writer was Danny Fingeroth.

After his own series ended, Darkhawk co-starred or cameoed in other titles over the following years, such as The New Warriors, Avengers/JLA, and Iron Man, eventually resurfacing in Runaways (vol. 2) #1–6, followed by Marvel Team-Up (vol. 3) #15 and the short-lived Loners series. The New Warriors writer Fabian Nicieza said in 1992 that "People keep coming up to me and asking, 'Is Darkhawk a member of the New Warriors or not?' Well, yes and no. The New Warriors isn't an official group with a rule book and charter and the like. They're more of a club for super-powered teens. So if Darkhawk wants to hang out on a Friday evening and talk about his powers, then he'll stop by the New Warriors' crash pad."

Darkhawk appeared within the "Secret Invasion" tie-in issues of Nova (vol. 4) (#17–18) and was the focus of the two-issue mini-series War of Kings: Darkhawk, written by C. B. Cebulski, Dan Abnett, and Andy Lanning. War of Kings: Darkhawk brought closure to Chris Powell's earthbound human relationships with his family and fellow Loners team members, and established a clean slate for the sequel series, War of Kings: Ascension, written by Abnett and Lanning.

Darkhawk appeared in Avengers Arena, a 2012–13 series by Dennis Hopeless and Kev Walker.

A new Darkhawk mini-series was published from 2021 to 2022.

== Fictional character biography ==
Christopher Powell was born in Queens, New York. While witnessing his policeman father accept a bribe from a crime boss at an abandoned amusement park, teenager Chris Powell discovered a mysterious amulet. This amulet allowed him to switch places with a powerful android that his mind controlled. Powell vowed to use the amulet as "an edge against crime." In this role, he worked with other superheroes and battled a number of costumed villains. Darkhawk occasionally worked with the New Warriors and was a provisional member of the West Coast Avengers. Darkhawk also battled a number of costumed villains, including the Brotherhood of Mutants.

Darkhawk's second android body. Art by Ron Lim.

Powell discovers that the android is stored and repaired aboard a starship in a dimension called Null Space. When he used the amulet to access the android body, his human body switched places with it. Five Darkhawk amulets were commissioned by alien crime lord Dargin Bokk. The scientists who created the technology eventually used them to assault Bokk. After Bokk destroyed the other scientists, two of the scientists beamed their minds to Earth and merged with two scientists Earth. Byron/Ned Dobbs and Mondu/John Trane created a sixth amulet, which was acquired by Powell.

=== Excelsior (the Loners) ===
Powell later joins a group of former teenage superheroes who were struggling with their current lot in life called the Loners (formerly known as Excelsior). Members of this group included Phil Urich, Turbo, Lightspeed, and Ricochet. The group is hired by a mysterious benefactor – later revealed to be Rick Jones – to track down the Runaways in Los Angeles.

Powell displays trouble controlling his anger in his Darkhawk persona, leading to a short skirmish with Turbo. Dismayed with himself, Powell admits to his teammates that he suffered a nervous breakdown. Powell decides to never turn into Darkhawk again, but this decision did not last long, as shortly thereafter the group battles Ultron. Darkhawk delivers the final blow, blowing Ultron to pieces. Following the battle and the revelation of Rick Jones's involvement, Excelsior opts to remain together and act as a more traditional superhero team.

Excelsior's members eventually change their minds about being superheroes and instead become a 'superhero support group' due to the events of the superhuman Civil War rendering moot their original purpose to dissuade or help young superheroes cope with their powers/superhuman identities, as this role was now being officially fulfilled by the U.S. government. However, a new addition to the group, Mattie Franklin convinces Powell to use his powers to help her take down Mutant Growth Hormone dealers in Los Angeles.

=== Secret Invasion ===
Deciding to register with the government, Darkhawk is assigned to the position of security chief at Project Pegasus. During the Skrull invasion, he teams up with his old team-mate Nova for two issues of that character's own title, but is also seen in the background of several issues thereafter.

=== War of Kings ===
Darkhawk is involved with the War of Kings event in a four-issue series written by Dan Abnett and Andy Lanning called War of Kings: Ascension. With the Loners series ending with low sales and unlikely to be followed with a sequel series, series writer C. B. Cebulski was assigned to write a two-issue War of Kings: Darkhawk series, with Abnett and Lanning co-scripting the second issue to ensure it tied into their own Ascension series.

In the series, a second Darkhawk armor appears near the Powell family home, and the unknown occupant of the armor forces Powell to transform to his own armored form shortly before an explosion rocks the immediate area. Powell's family survives the blast, but his mother is critically injured.

The new Darkhawk introduces himself as Talon and claims to be part of the Fraternity of Raptors, an order created as "the curators of history, and the custodians of the future," of which he and Powell are the last two members. He also explains that Powell's anger issues are a direct result of the amulet not being designed to work with humans. Talon offers to assist Powell with the amulet, and after some deliberation he opts to do so; the two then retreat to the Negative Zone.

The story picks up in War of Kings: Ascension. Powell and Talon are fighting a group of Chitinauts, bug troops that serve Catastrophus, a lieutenant of Annihilus, but Talon's brutal techniques horrify Powell. Powell manages to connect to the Datasong of the Null Source, which gives him visions of the true past of the Fraternity—a history of kidnappings and assassinations which lead Powell to conclude that the Fraternity are the real villains. At this point, Talon attacks him, purging Powell's consciousness from the armor and manifesting a new persona: Razor.

Talon and Razor recover the Cosmic Control Rod from Catastrophus, Talon stopping briefly to implant a suggestion in the gestating Annihilus, and proceed onward. Powell's personality is revealed not to have been wholly destroyed yet, and a vision of his father tells him that much of what he believed about the armor was false; the prior history was a lie made up by his own mind, the other armor a second configuration that took control to cover earlier anger issues. Horrified, Powell breaks free and finds himself on a great tree adorned with thousands of amulets like his own. Meanwhile, in the Negative Zone, Talon and Razor offer Blastaar the Cosmic Control Rod in exchange for his assistance influencing the outcome of the War of Kings.

On the tree, Powell encounters a Skrull who has a relationship with Talon much as Razor has with him. The Skrull also confides that humanity, as a newer race, cannot be wholly accounted for or controlled by the Raptors, and that Powell's own outbursts of rage have been growing pains in his own control. With this understanding, Powell reasserts control over the Darkhawk armor, but not before Razor shoots several Shi'ar and kills Shi'ar empress Lilandra Neramani.

=== Realm of Kings ===
In Realm of Kings, the Shi'ar Imperium declares Darkhawk the "Galaxy's Most Wanted," making Powell an intergalactic fugitive. Nova, not willing to believe Powell could be a murderer, tracks him to the planet Shard, which is in danger of falling into a rift in space known as the Fault. Nova offers to help Powell clear his name, but they are interrupted by an attacking biomass from the Fault, and by the awakening of another Raptor, named Gyre. All three are trapped on the planet as it is disintegrated by the Fault.

Darkhawk and Nova are saved by Nova's old enemy Sphinx, who seems unaware of Darkhawk's presence. Together, the two heroes join past versions of Reed Richards, Black Bolt, and Namorita in helping Sphinx combat his younger self. The young Sphinx draws his own warriors, including Gyre, into the battle, and Darkhawk faces and defeats Gyre in single combat. During the fight, Gyre reveals that many more Raptors are re-awakening. Ultimately, the elder Sphinx defeats his counterpart, and mentally controls Darkhawk into giving him his younger self's Ka Stone.

Darkhawk returns to Earth and Project Pegasus to help Nova fight the evil Quasar from the Cancerverse on the other side of the Fault. The evil Quasar damages Darkhawk so badly that his suit shuts down, leaving him alive but unable to accompany Nova as he deals with the Fault. Nova leaves Darkhawk in the care of Project Pegasus's medical team.

=== Avengers Arena ===
Darkhawk appears in Avengers Arena as part of the Marvel NOW! event. He is among the young superheroes who are abducted by Arcade and sent to Murderworld to fight to the death. Darkhawk is attacked by Death Locket, who tears his amulet from his chest. The amulet is found by Chase Stein, who transforms into the new Darkhawk. It is later revealed that Darkhawk is alive. After Death Locket releases him, Darkhawk attacks and knocks out Arcade. Darkhawk is taken away to parts unknown, injured but reunited with his amulet.

=== Infinity Countdown ===
During the "Infinity Countdown" storyline, Powell is shown to have joined the New York Police Department and is engaged to a woman named Miranda, with whom he has shared his history as Darkhawk. He experiences frequent visions of the Tree of Shadows in Null Space despite the Darkhawk amulet being damaged and no longer allowing him to change form. One day, he is sent out to the Wonderland Amusement Park, the place where he first became Darkhawk, to investigate a disturbance. There, he is accosted by two cops and almost attacked when he refuses their offer to take bribes. The group is attacked by two members of the Shi'ar Fraternity of Raptors, with one taking Powell's amulet and using it to change into Razor. The Razor personality asserts control, defeats the other Shi'ar, and teleports Powell to the Datasong in a place it calls "The Perch," where all of the android's memories of its time with Powell are stored. Razor, now calling itself Darkhawk, tells Powell that his compassion and dedication to justice have imprinted upon it, with it wants to rejoin with him to stop the Shi'ar Raptors from releasing the true Fraternity of Raptors. Powell accepts and becomes Darkhawk once more, merging with the Darkhawk android and gaining a new, more powerful form.

The Raptors attack Death's Head and swarm Darkhawk. Gyre wanted the Ratha'kon. Two tributes were required. Gyre uses Nova's brother Robbie Rider as a tribute, awakening the Dark Starhawk.

Dark Starhawk turns on Gyre and kills him, stating that he will bring order to the universe. The Raptors are eventually stopped when Death's Head rigs the power core of the Kree ship the Raptors stole to explode. Dark Starhawk survives the explosion, though stunned, allowing Powell to reclaim his amulet. Dark Starhawk then disappears in a flash of light after striking his Nega-Bands together.

=== Guardians of the Galaxy ===
Powell attends a meeting arranged by Starfox to review the will and testament of his brother Thanos. Powell would later find himself stranded in the middle of deep space while being brought into the clutches of the Universal Church of Truth. They had him in a mental simulation where he believes himself to have been separated from Razor, run through and across time and space; seeing past, present and future iterations of himself while in the black hole, only to finally find release in the care of a ship piloted by the Kree, Shi'ar and Skrulls. At the end of the simulation, Powell is de-aged, becoming younger than when he first found his amulet. Powell is later returned to his proper age.

== Powers and abilities ==
Darkhawk's abilities are derived from the techno-organic Raptor construct known as Razor, which possesses enhanced physical abilities, including strength, agility and reflexes, powered by the extraterrestrial amulet embedded in his chest. Initially, Chris Powell and Razor were separate entities, with Powell's mind possessing the Raptor body as the two switched places, leaving his human body in stasis. In Infinity Countdown, Powell fully merges with Razor, resulting in his amulet instead deconstructing and rebuilding his body when he becomes Darkhawk.

Initially, Darkhawk was able to glide via retractable wings under his arms. He later gains the ability to fly at variable speeds that let him soar from New York to California in a matter of hours and traverse between planets in seconds.

Before Powell merged with Razor, switching from Darkhawk to his human body and back would instantly repair the Darkhawk body, but this same process would not heal any injuries his human body sustained.

Darkhawk can project energy from the amulet in his chest as a focal point, either as concussive force blasts or as a circular energy shield. Darkhawk also has telescopic and infra-red vision, and a grappling hook.

For a time, Darkhawk was upgraded to a new body design, which gave him greatly enhanced powers. His amulet could project force bubbles in various shapes and he could form a hawk-shaped construct around his body. He could fire variable beams of energy from his eyes, be healed by generating an energy pod around his body, and had a single extendable claw on each wrist. He could also mentally communicate with the Darkhawk ship, and summon weapons from it. These abilities are later revealed to be a component of the Raptor's reconfiguration abilities, which allow Darkhawk to transform his armor into a variety of forms.

All Raptors share a hive mind dubbed the Datasong, which allows them to absorb, process, and share vast amounts of information. Darkhawk can potentially use this function to control the minds of others as well as divine the myriad of possible future outcomes based upon differing actions.

In his human form, Chris Powell has no superhuman abilities, though he has taken some karate and kendo classes.

== Enemies ==
The following are the enemies of Darkhawk:

- Evilhawk - Dargin Bokk is an alien crime lord.
- Hobgoblin - A goblin-themed villain possessed with demon.
- Lodestone - A magnetic-manipulating supervillain and criminal mercenary.
- Phillipe Bazin - A crime lord who clashed with Darkhawk.
- Portal - A mutant teenager who can teleport between dimensions. Later he became Darkhawk's ally.
- Savage Steel - title of villain in powered battle armor, used by members of police Cabal. Organization including Chris's father.
- Tombstone - A super-strong albino crime lord.
- U-Foes - A group of four supervillains.
  - Ironclad - A metal-skinned member of the U-Foes.
  - X-Ray - A member of the U-Foes who was permanently transformed into a living energy field.
  - Vapor - A member of the U-Foes who can alter her form into any known gas.
  - Vector - The telekinetic leader of the U-Foes.

== Other versions ==
=== House of M ===
An alternate universe version of Darkhawk appears in House of M as a member of the Wolfpack.

=== U.S. War Machine ===
An alternate universe version of Darkhawk appears in U.S. War Machine. This version is a psychopathic android which is kept under control via a virtual reality program.

=== Marvel Zombies ===
An alternate universe version of Darkhawk appears in Marvel Zombies: Dead Days.

=== Marvel Team-Up: League of Losers ===
In Marvel Team-Up (vol. 3), Darkhawk is among the heroes who travel to the future to prevent the villain Chronok from stealing Reed Richards' time machine. Their actions cause the creation of a new timeline, which they decide to stay in. Effectively trapped in the future, Darkhawk begins a romantic relationship with Dagger.

== Collected editions ==
Title	Issues Included	Published date	ISBN
Darkhawk Classic - Volume 1	Darkhawk #1-9	May 2012	978-0785159872
War of Kings: Warriors	War of Kings: Darkhawk #1-2, War of Kings: Ascension #1-4	March 2010	978-0785143680
Infinity Countdown: Darkhawk	Darkhawk #51, Infinity Countdown: Darkhawk #1-4	October 2018	978-1302914936
Darkhawk: Airborne	Darkhawk (vol. 2) #1-5, Darkhawk: Heart of the Hawk #1	March 2022	978-1302929060

== In other media ==
=== Television ===
- Darkhawk makes non-speaking cameo appearances in Fantastic Four.
- Robotic Darkhawks appear in Guardians of the Galaxy.

=== Video games ===
- Darkhawk appears in Disney Infinity 3.0.
- Darkhawk appears as a playable character in Lego Marvel Super Heroes 2.
- Darkhawk appears as a playable character in Marvel: Contest of Champions.
- Darkhawk appears as a playable character in Marvel: Future Fight.
- Darkhawk appears in Marvel Snap.
- Darkhawk appears as a playable character in Marvel Strike Force.
