= Loners (comics) =

Mini-series of comic books

Publication information
- Publisher: Marvel Comics
- First appearance: Runaways vol. 2 #1 (April 2005)
- Created by: Brian K. Vaughan; Adrian Alphona

In-story information
- Base(s): Los Angeles, California
- Member(s): Current members: Hollow; Lightspeed; Ricochet; Turbo; Rick Jones (sponsor); Former members: Darkhawk; Namie; Spider-Woman; Phil Urich; Geoffrey Wilder (magically posing as Chamber)

Loners (originally named Excelsior) are a superhero team appearing in American comic books published Marvel Comics. They first appeared in the pages of Runaways. The group consists of a Los Angeles–based support group for former teenage superheroes from New York, founded by Turbo of the New Warriors, and Phil Urich, the heroic former Green Goblin. Their goals are initially stated to be to help fellow teenage superheroes to adjust to normal lives while coping with their powers, and to dissuade other superpowered teenagers from becoming heroes, but these goals are discarded in their own miniseries in favor of the group apparently wanting to avoid using their powers for any reason, even if that means abandoning helpless victims of crime to their fate. Although all the characters were created by different authors and artists, the team itself was created by Brian K. Vaughan and Adrian Alphona, with other characters (Spider-Woman, Hollow, and Red Ronin) added to the cast during the events of the 2007 miniseries.

The group originally appeared in the Runaways story arc "True Believers". At the end of the story arc, it was revealed that the group was secretly sponsored by Rick Jones, on behalf of Captain America, who hoped to ensure the Runaways do not get into trouble. Following their battle with Ultron, Rick offered to sponsor the team full-time. Its creative team is C. B. Cebulski (writer) and Karl Moline (artist).

== Overview ==
Originally debuting in the book Runaways under the name "Excelsior", the team later received their own limited series with an option to continue as an ongoing should sales be high enough, though this was not the case. The title of the series and the team was changed from Excelsior to Loners, due to trademark issues as Stan Lee holds a trademark on the term "Excelsior!", though the team did appear in an issue of the third volume of Marvel Team-Up under the name Excelsior before Loners was published. The title premiered on April 11, 2007, and ran for six issues. In a stylistic departure from their debut appearance in Runaways as comic relief, Loners is not a comedy, though the covers of the individual issues still suggest a lighthearted tone by being direct homages to the imagery of John Hughes' films, and the exaggerated personalities from their Runaways debut are also retained entirely for the cast, though this does create some continuity discrepancies, particularly Darkhawk's infrequent lapses into potentially murderous violence in a manner that ignores later events from the Darkhawk series, and Julie Power no longer having the ability to teleport, her powers now including the ability to hover in the air without being in motion, and her character purporting to be from New York instead of Bainbridge Island, Washington. In a further departure from both their debut appearance and their appearances elsewhere in Marvel titles as a fully functioning superhero group who gather in costume, the group has a different and unprecedented function, changing from a peer support/counseling group of active superheroes to an addiction/recovery group. It can be observed that the methods utilised by the group in many instances contradict common practices of individual empowerment found in addiction/recovery groups in favor of codependency upon the group and its rituals. In the series, the "addiction" specified is addictive behavior: using superpowers, fighting crime, and helping those in need. The addictions are not to narcotic substance at any time during the series, although Mattie Franklin is seen getting drunk in a bar during the closing montage of issue 3 despite still being in high school, suggesting the possibility of alcohol dependence.

Julie Power and Johnny Gallo are also the subject of character retcons during the course of the series: whereas in his Runaways appearance Johnny's reasons for joining the group were given as being so he could be around other ex-teen heroes who had experienced early fame as a superhero and later couldn't cope without it, this was revised in Loners to being that he used superheroics for thrill seeking and to meet women, then revised a third time to being a response to his friend being killed during a superhero battle (though this battle—occurring during the events of the 'Wolverine: Enemy of the State' story arc—did not actually occur until after Johnny first appeared as a member of the Los Angeles–based Excelsior group, though he is portrayed during Loners in flashbacks as still living in New York at the time, working as a superhero alongside the friend in question: Eddie McDonough, who is also portrayed as being back in the Hornet armor he lost, somehow cured of the cerebral palsy which afflicted him). Julie's low intelligence displayed in the Runaways 'True Believers' story arc and the first three issues of Loners is also revealed as an affectation she adopts to fit in with the natives of Los Angeles and her fellow teammates, though she retains this personality for the rest of the series regardless of her revelation. Julie's age is also revised by several years, from the indeterminate "ex-teenage" of Runaways to the specific age of 17, and she no longer displays her teleportation powers, or the ability to create shields.

Three new team members were also introduced in the series: Penance (known as Hollow), Spider-Woman and Namie (the second version of the Red Ronin). After the miniseries, The Loners appear in a special ten page Christmas story within the 2007 Marvel Holiday Special.

After Mattie was killed and Darkhawk was severely injured (in "Grim Hunt" and The Thanos Imperative respectively), the remaining members of the team join the Avengers Academy.

== Members ==
=== Sponsor ===
- Rick Jones, on behalf of Captain America.

=== Original members ===
- Darkhawk (Chris Powell). He decided to give up his powers after his nightmares became too intense for him to handle. Chris is short-tempered and prone to violence, especially in his Darkhawk form, attacking not only his targets, but his own teammates. He later joins the New Avengers.
- Green Goblin (Phil Urich), the fourth, heroic, incarnation of the Green Goblin. After losing his costume and equipment during a battle, he finished college, earned a degree in journalism, and helped start Excelsior. He returned to New York City, working for the Daily Bugle (formerly Front Line). He became the Hobgoblin, who is working for Kingpin.
- Lightspeed (Julie Power), formerly of Power Pack. Convinced that the superhero lifestyle robbed her of her childhood innocence, she left her family at 15 years old and moved to California, hoping to become an actress. Currently attending the Avengers Academy as a teacher's assistant.
- Ricochet (Johnny Gallo), formerly of the Slingers. He is a mutant who has an early warning sense much like Spider-Man's, as well as acrobatic agility, dexterity with thrown objects, reflexes, and coordination.
- Turbo (Michiko "Mickey" Musashi), formerly of the New Warriors. Deciding she would do more good with her education than she would through adventure, she retired the Torpedo armor and returned to investigative journalism.
- Geoffrey Wilder, a time-displaced member of the Pride, disguised himself as Chamber to spy on the Loners.

=== Later members ===
- Hollow, formerly known as Penance of Generation X. It is unknown who is now residing in this hollow body.
- Namie, a mystery female character that is not one of the previously introduced teen female characters. Cebulski previously hinted that she does have ties to the Marvel Universe, eventually outed as a cyborg and the new model for the Red Ronin; UJ1-XD
- Spider-Woman (Mattie Franklin). After being exploited to create Mutant Growth Hormone, Mattie moved to Los Angeles to start over and has been going to meetings regularly, but she left the team afterwards. Later, she was seen in New York City but was captured by Ana Kraven and was later killed by Sasha Kraven.

Within War of Kings: Darkhawk #1 are three former heroes that are seen among the Loners' support group, although they have not been identified.

== Plot summary ==
The covers for each issue of the series are based on posters from 1980s teen films directed or written by John Hughes.

=== Fear of Flying ===
- Issue One: The Breakfast Club

The first issue opens with Julie Power apologizing to Phil Urich on her cell phone; Phil tries to convince her not to do anything rash but fails: Julie steps off a tall building, free falls, and then flies into the air. Shortly afterwards, both Phil and Mickey Musashi discuss Julie's actions and plan their next move.

The support group meets in the basement of a church, and after waiting for Julie to arrive, decide to begin without her. Mattie Franklin is asked to speak first, recalling her experiences as Spider-Woman. Julie finally arrives at the tail-end of a cell phone conversation apparently with her brother Alex. She apologizes to the group for both her tardiness and her recent relapse.

Chris Powell insults Julie, who suggests that she has the hardest struggle of them all because she has had her powers the longest (seven years). Mattie, however, points out that although she has not been in the hero business as long as the rest of the group members, concealing her psionic spider-legs subjects her to constant physical pressure. After dramatically revealing her appendages, she storms out of the meeting.

Outside the church, Mattie explains to Chris that she has some unfinished business with MGH dealers, who exploited her in the past; she has tracked them to Los Angeles. She asks that he assist her as Darkhawk for just one mission.

Darkhawk and Spider-Woman storm the MGH dealers' hideout and defeat the dealers easily, but they are attacked by the person "supplying the materials" for MGH, Nekra. Luckily, support group member Johnny Gallo (Ricochet) has followed Darkhawk and Spider-Woman to the dealers' base of operations and aids them in escaping Nekra's clutches. After defeating her, the trio discovers a list containing the names of supervillains being supplied MGH by the dealers and decides to investigate further, while agreeing not to tell the rest of the group.

=== Reflex Actions ===
- Issue Two: Ferris Bueller's Day Off

A week later, Johnny contemplates what to do next. Later at a restaurant, Johnny tries to convince both Chris and Mattie to tell the rest of the support group about what they have done. Mattie insists that she needs more time to follow up on the information they have gathered. When Johnny sarcastically reminds Mattie of her "act" during the recent group meeting, she nearly attacks him and accuses him of attending the group for selfish reasons.

At the next support group meeting, Phil mentions the MGH bust and suggests that it could be used as an additional reason to further encourage teen superheroes to establish normal lives. Johnny gets up to speak, Mattie and Chris thinking he is about to reveal their recent actions. However, he tells the group about why he moved to Los Angeles. After the Slingers disbanded, his best friend Eddie McDonough (Hornet) convinced Johnny to continue as a superhero. Ricochet admits that he did so for the glory rather than to help people, but when Hornet was killed by Wolverine, Johnny blames himself for his friend's death, since he refused to help him prior to the situation.

Johnny unsuccessfully tries to contact both Mattie (who ignores his call while reading over some research about Ricochet's former teammates) and Chris (who arrives at Mickey's place to take her on a date). Ricochet heads to the deserted warehouse that is their main lead; he sneaks in and is shocked to see women held under sedation in fluid-filled containers. He is attacked by Rose's former assassin Delilah, who assumes he is the same Ricochet who betrayed her in the past.

Although Ricochet defeats her, during the course of the battle one of the containers is smashed and the former Generation X mutant known as Penance emerges.

=== What Lies Beneath ===
- Issue Three: Weird Science

Phil Urich narrates events as the group meet in a local emergency room. He relates (through external analepsis) the tale of Johnny's fight with Penance and how it led to Julie being stabbed after flying into frame in the middle of Johnny and Penance's fight. Suddenly remembering that he left Penance and several defenseless women back in the warehouse, Johnny runs out of the ER attempting to return to the scene, but he is stopped by accusations from the group about his behaviour. Penance appears before the group having somehow tracked Johnny, and invisible gun-toting soldiers suddenly attack, having somehow tracked Penance. There follows a brief battle which ends when Mickey appeals to the head of the opposing group as a fellow Japanese national and they negotiate a settlement in their "own language", the mysterious terms of which remain unknown to the group. The various members go their separate ways for the evening, and Penance returns home with Phil to sleep on his floor. Julie flies from the hospital before her parents can be contacted about her condition, and it becomes apparent Phil is somehow hallucinating that he sees the Green Goblin when he looks in the mirror.

=== What You Don't Know ===
- Issue Four: Pretty in Pink

Julie and Johnny have lunch; he is astounded by her healing abilities, noting that she was stabbed in "the gut", despite her scar clearly being visible on her shoulder. Julie is intrigued by Hollow (formerly Penance) staying at Phil Urich's place, and fans the rumors about Mickey and Chris' romance. The two arrive at Marvel Studios to keep Julie's appointment for an audition.

At Phil's apartment, he does dishes and looks over at the sleeping Hollow. An image of her kissing him as the Green Goblin appears within a dinner plate, leading him to smash the plate and awaken Hollow; she does her best to comfort him.

At the audition, the director suggests Julie needs acting lessons; she leaves in a huff. She and Johnny criticize the director, who they think over-uses CGI effects. Another director named Mark Lowell overhears them and mentions the troubles he has in finding good stuntmen. Julie offers both her and Johnny's services, which pleases the director but creates doubts for Johnny — the two must use their powers to perform their new jobs.

At the James Dean Observatory; Chris apologizes to Mickey. She admits that she dislikes having "other girls in the group". Chris asks why Mickey does not view Julie as a girl, and Mickey begins to respond that Julie "isn't--", but catches herself, mentioning that Julie is focused on her acting career and not "into the dating scene".

Julie, dressed as the Black Cat and Johnny, dressed as Iron Fist, perform stunts. The director expresses his satisfaction. His compliments lead Julie to fly off the set; Johnny contacts Mattie and tells her that they will have to reschedule their meeting. Julie apparently phones her sister Katie with her news. Back at Julie's dressing room, the director barges in and acts in an inappropriate manner, eventually physically accosting Julie. He threatens to report her unauthorized use of her powers when she throws him from the trailer. Julie counters that there are laws to protect minors against sexual predators. The director is shocked; he was unaware that Julie is only seventeen. Julie leaves the film set.

At the meeting, Julie speaks first. As Johnny did previously, she admits to lying about her reasons for quitting superheroics. She hands out a photograph of Power Pack, suggesting that from early childhood she needed to learn to keep her powers and other information about her siblings secret (though in the original Power Pack series, it was Julie who most resisted hiding her powers, and in all other appearances as a member of Excelsior/Loners, she mentions her siblings frequently, and does not wear a mask to hide her identity, even though all the other members of the team do). She admits that a Hollywood career may not happen for her and resolves to be more honest.

Julie's final admission is interrupted by Nekra, who informs the group that she found them by using the information regarding their support group that they regularly release on the internet and to attack them.

=== Chinks in the Armor ===
- Issue Five: Some Kind of Wonderful

The group is overwhelmed by Nekra. Phil and Mickey are powerless to stop the villain, and only the timely arrival of Namie ends the battle. Afterwards Phil learns of Chris and Mickey being a couple. At the same time, Mattie and Johnny go back to Johnny's apartment. While Johnny is taking a shower, Mattie investigates his place. Johnny catches her and Mattie seduces him in order to keep her cover. It is later revealed she was hired by the former Slinger Dusk's parents to locate their daughter. Meanwhile, Mickey confronts Chris about feeling helpless in the battle with Nekra, as well as for Chris not giving up the Darkhawk amulet. Mickey reveals she felt powerless without her armor and feels inadequate next to the rest of the group because they have 'real' powers — except for Chris, whose armor mirrors Mickey's own superhero abilities and identity. Their argument is put on hold when Phil arrives with Hollow, who has changed colour from the previous issue without explanation. Phil begins berating Mickey, then attacking Chris and stealing the amulet, in which he transforms into a Goblin-like version of Darkhawk.

=== Double Identities ===
- Issue Six: Sixteen Candles

Chris is recovering from the attack, only to witness Phil in Darkhawk armor attacking Hollow and advancing on Mickey. Chris manages to tap into the amulet's power and becomes Darkhawk in his second armored form, though it is not explained how he can utilise the armor without a whole amulet, as it has been previously established that without such an artifact, the Darkhawk armor remains inert. While the two battle, the other Loners, including an armored Mickey, arrive. Phil is defeated and Chris takes back the amulet. Phil then leaves the Loners, but not before revealing that Namie is a cyborg (the new Red Ronin), that Mickey made a secret bargain with Fuyumi Fujikawa, and that Julie is hiding a terrible secret from the group. Penance picks up Phil and they fly away unhindered, though the means of levitation and propulsion by which this is achieved are never explained. Disgusted, Mattie berates the group about their past decisions about not using their powers, as well as her choice of sleeping with Johnny, and leaves.

A week later, the Loners are back together minus Hollow, Phil, and Mattie. None of the subplots from the series bar the identity of Namie have been resolved, and the issue ends with no one willing to talk about their problems or what has so far happened.

After the series has ended, the group are next seen in the apartment of Mickey Musashi celebrating Christmas and attempting to solve some of their personal issues with each other through Secret Santa.

== The future ==
At the 2008 Wizard World: Philadelphia a question about a possible new Loners series was raised. C. B. Cebulski said there are plans for some of the characters in "different places" (see "War of Kings" note below), suggesting that it was "a tough market for a book like Loners", though Marvel's overall sales figures were actually increasing at the time of Loners' publication, with even the company's traditionally low-selling (via the direct market) 'All Ages' range slowly making gains at the same time Loners dropped several thousand readers.

Author Cebulski had Loners planned for 18 issues but did not know if he would be allowed to go onto ongoing. He hoped to continue Loners and waits for Marvel's permission. However, sales figures revealed Loners as selling 5,000 copies less than Marvel's break-even point for ongoing titles towards the end of its run, despite initially good sales for early issues. With a follow-up series unlikely, Cebulski posted an apology to readers on Newsarama forums that he did not "meet and match all your expectations for the characters", and that he would clarify continuity errors and unexplained events in a series post-mortem on that very site. Though he declined to answer questions that would have been answered in future issues of the book had they ever been commissioned or published.

Darkhawk later appeared in the pages of Nova as the head of security for Project Pegasus. He revealed that he had registered with the Initiative and that Justice had recommended him for the position. Darkhawk is also a cast member within the War of Kings event, with his own two issue miniseries in February and March 2009 tidying up continuity problems created by the unlikelihood of a sequel to Loners and freeing the character for use as the lead in Dan Abnett and Andy Lanning's four-part miniseries, War of Kings: Ascension. Though no longer associated with the Loners, Darkhawk's former teammates appear within both issues of his miniseries (though it remains unexplained how they - and the church in which they held their meetings - relocated from Los Angeles to New York), and it becomes apparent that Darkhawk left the team because he could no longer turn his back on his responsibilities as a superhero and wished to "focus (his) anger into something productive", creating friction with some members of the Loners. Though the group is hostile towards him, he makes amends with his former girlfriend Mickey Musashi/Turbo. During the events of War of Kings: Ascension, it is claimed that Darkhawk is now 'the most wanted man in the galaxy' and will play a role in future issues of Nova; it seems unlikely he will rejoin the Loners in comic book limbo for the foreseeable future.

The remaining Loners (without Namie/Red Ronin, but with Penance/Hollow) are seen within the Avengers Academy series among the other various superpowered youths and young adults being offered additional training as part-time students, with Julie attending there as a full-time student and teacher's assistant.

== Other versions ==
In the alternate reality of the "Days of Future Now" storyline, the Excelsior team consists of Cecilia Reyes, Diamond Lil, Random, and Ricochet.

== Collected editions ==
Title	Material collected	Publication date	ISBN
The Loners: The Secret Lives Of Super Heroes	The Loners #1–6	March 2008	ISBN 978-0785122159
