= João M. P. Lemos =

Portuguese illustrator and comic book author

João M. P. Lemos is a Portuguese illustrator and comic book author.

He was a member of the former Bica Studio, in Lisbon. He did work for Marvel Comics designing, penciling and inking Avengers Fairy Tales #1, which was written by C. B. Cebulski.

Lemos has created set designs and storyboards for Kunta, a short film directed by Angelo Torres and also authored its credits and logo design.

Writer Midori Snyder compared Lemos' work to Erté's. Lemos is known for undertaking unusual amounts of research in most of his works.

Lemos illustrated the story book featured on 2011 ABC series Once Upon a Time.
