= Power Pack =

Marvel Comics superhero team

- The team as seen in the 2005 series

Publication information
- Publisher: Marvel Comics
- First appearance: Power Pack #1 (Aug. 1984)
- Created by: Louise Simonson; June Brigman

In-story information
- Base(s): New York City (1984–1990); Bainbridge Island (2000)
- Member(s): Alex Power; Julie Power; Jack Power; Katie Power; Franklin Richards

Power Pack is a superhero team consisting of four young siblings appearing in American comic books published by Marvel Comics. Created by writer Louise Simonson and artist June Brigman, they first appeared in their own series in 1984, which lasted 62 issues, and have since appeared in other books. Power Pack is the first team of pre-teen superheroes in the Marvel Universe and the first team of heroes in comics to feature characters of that age operating without adult supervision. In 2005, the title was relaunched as a series aimed at younger readers—though this was eventually declared a separate continuity from that of the original series and the mainstream Marvel Universe.

The team consists of four siblings: Alex Power, Julie Power, Jack Power, and Katie Power. The dying alien called Whitey, a scientist of the Kymellian race, transfers one of his four superpowers to each of the Power children so they can save their planet from the alien conquerors known as the Zn'rx (also known as the Snarks). The children band together as the superhero team Power Pack. Along with fighting aliens and super-villains, the team's stories were known for focusing on morality debates and social issues such as child abuse, homelessness, drug abuse, bullying, and the ethics of using excessive or lethal force in combat.

== Publication history ==
=== Original series ===
During the early 1980s, Marvel Comics had a policy that all their editors should also be writing comic books. Despite this, Louise Simonson recalled,

I had resisted [editor-in-chief Jim] Shooter's encouragement to write stuff or do freelance stuff because I thought he had writers whose livelihoods depended on their doing books and it didn't feel fair to take the work away from them. I had a job. But then Shooter hired a whole batch of new editors, and my workload was cut in half. I got bored and I thought I should create something rather than take one of the jobs that were already there, so I proposed the idea for "Power Pack" to Shooter. He eventually loved the idea, and so that was my taste of writing. I found it more challenging than editing, and way more fun, because I had been editing for a long time so I think it had gotten too easy for me.

Simonson chose June Brigman as Power Pack's penciler because of her talent for drawing children. The Power Pack series premiered in May 1984 (cover date August 1984) in a double-sized issue inked by Bob Wiacek. The series continued into 1991, during which time Brigman and Wiacek were replaced by Jon Bogdanove and Hilary Barta as principal artists, and Bogdanove took over as writer. The Power Pack letters column, titled "Pick of the Pack", printed drawings and jokes about the characters submitted by readers, an unusual practice for a Marvel title.

In the first story of the series, the alien Kymellian known as Whitey is fatally injured by the alien villains known as Snarks. He gives the four Power children his powers before dying. His mass control power goes to Jack, his energy and disintegration power goes to Katie, his ability to fly goes to Julie, and his control over gravity goes to Alex. In issue #25, the team's powers are temporarily stolen, then returned but rearranged. Due to this "power switch", each Power Pack child now has an ability wielded by one of their siblings, leading to a change in codenames. The Power Pack children finally switch their costumes to match their new powers in issue #47. In issue #52, another rearrangement of powers and codenames occurs.

Advertisement for the debut of the team's comic book (1984)

Unlike superheroes such as Spider-Man or Batman who were orphaned, free agents, or teenagers often trusted to be on their own without supervision, Power Pack was made up of pre-adolescent siblings who had a close relationship with each other, as well as their supportive parents Jim and Maggie Power. Early in the series, the children decide to keep their powers and superhero activities concealed from their parents, believing it would cause them stress and worry. This decision leads to several moral compromises and feelings of guilt for the Power Pack members whenever they have to lie to friends and family or allow harm to occur because helping could mean revealing their abilities. The question of whether or not the powers should be revealed is an ongoing source of debate among the children. Power Pack readers also argued the matter out in the letters pages. During Jon Bogdanove's story "Revenge of the Bogeyman", which was a tie-in for the crossover Inferno, the parents learn their children are superheroes. Bogdanove depicted Jim and Maggie Power as so overwhelmed by the situation that they suffer mental breakdowns. To help the Power family, the New Mutants use illusory clones to convince Jim and Maggie Power that their children were never superheroes. This restored the secret identity status quo. Fans reacted negatively to this resolution, saying it was a deus ex machina, that it avoided dealing with the issue of the Powers' secret identities, and that it characterized Jim and Maggie Power as weak and irresponsible in a way inconsistent with their earlier portrayals. Bogdanove attempted to partially address these criticisms in Power Pack #50 with the retcon that Jim and Maggie's mental breakdowns were the result of a Kymellian post-hypnotic suggestion rather than their emotional reaction to learning their children were superheroes.

Despite the characters of Power Pack being children, the series often dealt with mature issues. Many of the social problems of the 1980s found their way into the book's storylines. Among the themes addressed were pollution, drug abuse, runaways, kidnapping, gun violence, bullying, orphanhood, and homelessness. Stories regularly depicted the Power children learning and debating how to use their potentially lethal powers responsibly, often on their own but sometimes with guidance from older heroes such as Spider-Man. In one early issue, Jack is wracked with remorse when he thinks he has killed a man. In a later story arc, Katie seriously injures a Snark prince named Jakal, which causes her immense guilt and leads her to call herself a "monster".

Through the series, the children age and mature. In issue #1, Alex is 12, Julie is 10, Jack is 8, and Katie is 5. In issue #45, Julie graduates from elementary school with honors in English, and the story says she will join Alex at school 44 (an actual middle school existing in New York City).

The same year Power Pack debuted, the team appeared alongside Spider-Man in a special comic designed to discuss children targeted by sexual abuse. The one-shot issue, written by Louise Simonson, was distributed for free and reprinted in the comics sections of many major newspapers. Marvel continued the campaign by featuring the characters in print public service announcements. Later the same year, the writers used the Snark Wars storyline (wherein the children are kidnapped by the evil Snark alien race) to address the issue of child abduction. During the same storyline, photos of missing children were printed in lieu of the comic's regular letters column. In 1989, the Power Pack teamed-up with Cloak and Dagger in a special graphic novel addressing teen homelessness and runaways. Hotline telephone numbers for Covenant House were printed on the back cover.

Along with Spider-Man and the duo of Cloak and Dagger, Power Pack frequently encounter members of the X-Men and New Mutants. In issue #16, they meet Franklin Richards (son of Mister Fantastic and the Invisible Woman of the Fantastic Four), and in issue #17 Franklin becomes a part-time member of Power Pack. He joins on many other adventures, occasionally staying with the Power family for days at a time when his own family are off on adventures. Franklin has a tense relationship with Katie Power, as Simonson explained: "Katie hates Franklin's guts. He's smaller than she is, and the others are making a big deal of him. She considers him low man in the pecking order. ... Katie and Franklin will kind of become friends, but there will always be a little bit of rivalry between the two of them."

Starting with issue #42, Jon Bogdanove, who wrote issue #36 as a guest writer, took over as regular writer, remaining in that capacity until issue #52. A number of other fill-ins took place in the series's later years; Howard Mackie wrote issue #34, Julianna Jones wrote issues #38 and #45, (Note: Due to an editorial mistake, the credits for #45 were also printed in #44, resulting in that issue being erroneously credited to Juliana Jones as well, when it was actually written and drawn by Jon Bogdanove. This mistake is acknowledged in the letters columns of Power Pack #46 and 47.) Steven Heyer wrote #41, Terry Austin wrote issues #46 and #53, Judy Bogdanove wrote #54, and Dwayne McDuffie wrote issue #55. During Bogdanove's final issues, Franklin Richards returns as a regular member of the team.

Further changes involved Alex Power mutating into a Kymellian without explanation, forcing him to hide from his girlfriend Allison as well as from public life. The series was cancelled with issue #62. The final issue, printed in the fourth quarter of 1990 (cover-dated February 1991), depicts the team and their parents journeying into space together.

One year after the original series' cancellation, creators Louise Simonson and June Brigman teamed up for the one-shot issue Power Pack Holiday Special (published in fourth quarter of 1991, with a cover date of February 1992). The one-shot comic resolved the cliffhanger the series had ended on, restored the Power Pack's original powers, and undid some of the changes to the characters done during the run by Michael Higgins and Tom Morgan. Power Pack Holiday Special also included a short comedy story involving an art style that evoked Calvin and Hobbes, and a short story that showed an older, teenage Julie dealing with romance and self-esteem issues.

The Power Pack stories were reprinted by Marvel UK beginning around 1986. It was Marvel UK's practice at the time to use a less well-known series as a secondary story in a comic devoted to more recognizable characters, and Power Pack became the back-up "strip" in a run of Marvel's licensed Star Wars weekly Return of the Jedi. During this period, it was printed partly in black and white and partly in color, as was the main Star Wars strip. Power Pack subsequently became the back-up strip for the UK ThunderCats comic, where it remained until its eventual replacement by the Galaxy Rangers series.

=== 2000 miniseries ===
A four-part Power Pack mini-series published in 2000 depicted the children as now being slightly older than when they had last been in the 1991 Power Pack Holiday Special. Katie was now in the fifth grade (having skipped two grades due to her intelligence), Jack had joined Julie in middle school, and Alex was now a teenager in high school. James and Maggie, the children's parents, were now aware that their children were also the heroes of Power Pack and accepted it. The Power children now wore masks when in costume and their superhero activities were largely restricted to "practice sessions" in the forest around their new home in Bainbridge Island, ten miles (16 km) from Seattle. The series once again pitted the Pack against Queen Mauraud and the Snarks.

=== Return of Power Pack ===
Joe Quesada announced in a New Joe Fridays column at Newsarama that Power Pack would be returning to the Marvel Universe in late 2007, after the events of Civil War. However, due to the various delays within their release shipping schedules for Marvel Comics, these plans were put on hold. A new Power Pack story was commissioned for the 2007 Marvel Holiday Special, which would have been the first original material featuring the full cast in the standard Marvel Universe since the 2000 mini-series. It was briefly summarized as "Power Pack relives holidays past" in official Marvel solicits, but the story was scrapped from the publication at the last minute, when it was decided to prioritize the recently canceled title The Loners, which featured Julie Power among its cast. A Loners story written by C. B. Cebulski ran in place of the Power Pack story, though the official solicitation information still listed the Power Pack story and description.

Three of the Power siblings – Alex, Jack, and Katie – appear within Fantastic Four #574 (2010) as guests celebrating Franklin Richards' birthday. They were all depicted as only slightly older than they had been in the 2000 mini-series, with Alex still a teenager. During the story, Alex was invited to join Reed Richards' Future Foundation. He then made frequent appearances in the Fantastic Four series.

In 2020, a five-issue limited series written by Ryan North and illustrated by Nico Leon began publication as part of Marvel's Outlawed event.

"Power Pack: Into The Storm," a monthly five-issue series written by Louise Simonson and penciled by June Brigman, began publication in January 2024.

== Fictional team history ==
=== At the beginning ===
Alex (age 12), Julie (10), Jack (8), and Katie Power (5) were bright, normal American children living with their parents in a beachfront house in Virginia. Their father, Dr. James Power, was a physicist who discovered a process to generate energy from antimatter with the assistance of a converter, of which he made a prototype. The process was, however, known to several alien races to cause chain reactions and destroy planets, and Dr. Power's knowledge of the process was discovered by Aelfyre "Whitey" Whitemane, a member of the horse-like Kymellian species. A similar accident destroyed the Kymellians' home planet.

Whitey tried to stop the experiment by warning the Powers, but was mortally wounded by his enemies, the reptilian Snarks, in the process. The Snarks kidnapped Dr. Power and his wife, Margaret, hoping to obtain the secret of antimatter. Whitey rescued the Power children and told them what was happening. Before dying, he passed his powers to them to complete his mission.

The children, with the help of Whitey's "Smartship", a sentient starship called Friday, managed to stop the antimatter test by stealing and destroying the converter and rescued their parents from the Snarks. They decided to continue being superheroes and to hide their powers from their parents. Alex took the codename Gee, Julie became Lightspeed, Jack became Mass Master, and Katie became Energizer. They wore costumes made for them by Friday, which were Kymellian spacesuits. The costumes were constructed of unstable molecules and could materialize and disappear on voice command.

After rescuing their parents, the entire family moves to New York City, where the team attempted to deal with normal "kid problems" such as bullies and loose teeth while battling some of the deadliest villains in the Marvel Universe. The Pack fought the villain Kurse on two occasions during Secret Wars II. They were also heavily involved in the events of the Fall of the Mutants and Inferno storylines. During the Mutant Massacre, they descended into the sewers and fought Sabretooth.

The Pack's two greatest enemies during the original series were the Snarks and Carmody/The Bogeyman. The Snarks generally attempted to kidnap the Power children and steal their powers. Carmody, James Power's former employer, spotted the Power children when they stole the antimatter converter at the beginning of the series and became obsessed with revenge. At first, he tried to work with government agencies to prove the Powers were mutants. Later, he became the supervillain Bogeyman. After being thrown into Limbo by Magik, he returned in a demonic form and nearly killed the entire Power family before committing suicide.

Power Pack joined forces with Cloak and Dagger, the X-Men, and the New Mutants on numerous occasions.

The team took great pains to conceal their abilities from their family and "normal" friends. However, during Inferno, when confronted by the demonic Carmody, the children were forced to reveal their powers to save their parents. The discovery led Jim and Maggie to have mental breakdowns. They were restored to normal through the combined efforts of Mirage and Gosamyr, who convinced them that the superpowered children were clones created to protect them from Carmody and that the "real" Power children, who were powerless, had been taken away and guarded by the New Mutants until Carmody was defeated. This explanation placated their parents and, once they were reunited with their "normal" children, their minds healed themselves. The "clones", which had been generated by Mirage, were then removed, making the children's secret safe once again.

Another occasional member of the team was Franklin Richards, the son of Mister Fantastic and the Invisible Woman, who went by the name Tattletale while adventuring. James and Margaret Power were introduced to Franklin after the events of the Snark Wars, and befriended Reed and Sue Richards when Franklin was returned to Avengers Mansion. Subsequently, Franklin was often invited to stay with the Power family while his parents were away on missions. Although Franklin was a member of the group, the Fantastic Four had no knowledge of Power Pack until the end of the series; instead, they thought of the Power children simply as "Franklin's friends".

=== End of the series ===
Some time later, Alex underwent a transformation into a Kymellian, and Margaret Power began losing her mind. The Power family sought help for Margaret and Alex in various places, beginning with Reed Richards' lab, but their efforts were disrupted by the Red Ghost and his super apes.

The Power family traveled to the UK to try to find help for Margaret and Alex, but the institute was overrun by Nightmare and they encountered Excalibur. After that the Powers visited the Caribbean. The children planned to enjoy the sun and sand while their father consulted with colleagues but found themselves confronted with what seemed to be an alien attack on the beach where they were relaxing.

The family decided to abandon New York and fly with Friday to New Kymellia to seek help for Alex and his mother.

Both Alex and his parents had been replaced by "pseudoplasm" doubles by a renegade Kymellian Technocrat and his ally, the exiled Maraud (called Meraud in this storyline). The real Alex and his parents were being held captive in the Technocrat's hidden satellite orbiting New Kymellia. Eventually, the other Power siblings learned the truth and rescued their family, switching powers several times as needed, and barely escaping from the satellite before it was destroyed by Maraud.

After recovering on New Kymellia, the Power family returned to New York with Friday. Each of the children was back in possession of their original power, and their parents remained unaware of their children's powers and of Power Pack's existence.

== Post-series ==
=== Alex, New Warriors and the Future Foundation ===
The Kymellians had given Alex the ability to absorb the powers of his siblings into himself and thus use them all. With these powers, he joined the New Warriors superhero group under the name Powerpax, later Powerhouse. This caused some friction with Alex's brother and sisters; even their parents noticed the heightened levels of hostility and forced the children to see a psychologist. Alex eventually gave the others' powers back; the four reverted to their original names (except Alex, who named himself Zero-G and Julie, who was now called Starstreak, the name Katie had chosen when she had Julie's powers). Speedball later tried to recruit Alex back into the New Warriors. Alex politely refused, citing the conflicts his membership would cause among his siblings, though Katie offered her services, to Speedball's chagrin.

At some point outside of any published story, their parents discovered that the children had superpowers and were active as superheroes. Why Power Pack's parents could now retain this information without suffering mental trauma and insanity – thanks to telepathic manipulation by Byrel Whitemane that had previously been established as impossible to circumvent – has not been explained.

Following the events of the 2000 mini-series, Julie left the family home in unrevealed circumstances to try to become an actress in Los Angeles. Despite Julie's departure from Power Pack, the team defeats Big Wheel. Katie is later seen in costume having beaten several A.I.M. agents unconscious, when Flatman and Doorman offered her membership in the Great Lakes Avengers but she declined, and Power Pack fight Grizzly in New Jersey, a sighting which is used as his alibi against charges that he robbed Madison Square Garden.

During Marvel's Civil War event, Alex's codename Powerhouse was briefly mentioned by Hindsight Lad, an ex-teammate who exposed the secret identities of many New Warriors. Alex is one of the 142 registered superheroes who appear on the cover of the comic book Avengers: The Initiative #1.

He later joined Reed Richards' Future Foundation project, which allowed gifted children living within the Baxter Building to map out the outlook for their generation.

=== Julie, Excelsior/Loners, Avengers Academy and Future Foundation ===
Sometime after the events of the 2000 mini-series, Julie Power concluded that adventuring had deprived her of a normal childhood. She dropped out of high school, left her family, and moved to Los Angeles to become an actress. She joined Excelsior, a support group for "former" teenage superheroes, where she is once again known as Lightspeed. Excelsior's first mission was to return the members of the Runaways to the foster care from which the children had absconded and ended with Excelsior battling Ultron. Though they are not seen on-panel, it is established that Excelsior spend several months attempting to recapture the child cast of the Runaways, but are constantly thwarted by being ineffectual, getting roped into cleaning up after the Runaways' crimefighting exploits, and on occasion simply by being outsmarted by the Runaways.

The Loners are all registered under the Superhuman Registration Act, but consider themselves retired from super-heroics when they are not battling superpowered menaces or operating in public as superheroes attempting to capture runaway superpowered children. However, Julie later tells the rest of the group that she is not registered. While she is less intelligent and articulate than previously established, Julie reveals in Loners #4 that this is merely an affectation she adopts for the benefit of others – she pretends to be a "dumb blonde" to fit in with Los Angelenos. It had previously been established that Julie is a redhead, her "blonde" hair the result of using light hues in the production of the comic's art to reflect the brighter climate of the west coast.

The Loners' support group has moved to New York City, where Julie is presumably seen, though not named, at recent meetings. As with the cast's sudden relocation to Los Angeles from New York between the cancellation of their series and the beginning of Runaways volume 2, the move is not explained.

Julie was seen among the other young superheroes to arrive on the new campus for the Avengers Academy, where she is attending classes as a teacher assistant, under Quicksilver's tutelage.

Sometime after Julie ended the relationship with Karolina Dean, she was dealing with her depression and dropping out of college; when Alex and Dragon Man appeared in her apartment and recruited her on a rescue mission to help save the Foundation. Afterward, she joined the team as both teacher and co-leader of the FF.

== Members ==
The Power siblings have changed powers on several occasions and are the core of the Pack.

Real Name	Codename	Codename history (associated power)	Notes
Alex Power	Zero-G	Gee (gravity), Destroyer (energy), Mass Master (density), Powerpax/Powerhouse (gravity, energy, density, acceleration), Zero-G (gravity)	Alex was briefly a member of the New Warriors. Currently a member of the Future Foundation. Rejoins his siblings again as Power Pack.
Julie Power	Lightspeed	Lightspeed (acceleration), Molecula (density), Starstreak (acceleration, teleportation)	Her flight trail is rainbow-like but features only the subtractive primary colors yellow, magenta, and cyan. Currently attending classes at the Avengers Academy. Recently joined the Future Foundation, and along with Alex and their other siblings has reformed Power Pack.
Jack Power	Mass Master	Mass Master (density), Counterweight (gravity), Destroyer (energy)	
Katie Power	Energizer	Energizer (energy), Starstreak (acceleration), Counterweight (gravity)	
Franklin Richards (honorary member)	Formerly Tattletale, later known as Powerhouse	Precognition, astral projection, limited telepathy	He officially joined Power Pack in #17 and has not been an active member since the end of Power Pack volume 1. Currently a member of the Future Foundation. Son of Reed Richards (Mr. Fantastic) and Susan Storm/Richards (Invisible Woman) of the Fantastic Four.
Kofi Whitemane		Teleportation, energy projection, gravity alteration, healing, force field projection, air manipulation.	Unofficial member. Kofi is a Kymellian youth and cousin of Whitey who made his most recent appearance in the 2000 Power Pack mini-series.
Friday		Warp drive, flight, supercomputer, force field	The Smartship Friday is an intelligent starship.

== Other versions ==
=== Age of Apocalypse ===
An alternate universe iteration of the Power Pack appear in Age of Apocalypse. This version of the group were captured, experimented on, and fused together by Beast.

=== All-ages miniseries ===
An alternate universe iteration of the Power Pack from Earth-5631 appear in a self-titled miniseries aimed at young children, written by Marc Sumerak and penciled by Gurihiru Studios. In later years, Sumerak and Gurihiru Studios, among other creators, would release further miniseries that would see the Power Pack work with the X-Men, the Avengers, Spider-Man, and the Fantastic Four.

=== Mini Marvels ===
An alternate universe iteration of the Power Pack appear in Mini Marvels.

=== House of M ===
Alex and Julie Power appear in House of M: Avengers #3 as members of the Wolfpack.

=== Marvel 2099 ===
Adult variants of Julie, Jack, and Kate Power, later revealed to be Skrulls brainwashed into believing they were them, appear in stories set in the Marvel 2099 imprint.

=== Marvel Zombies ===
A zombified iteration of the Power Pack appear Marvel Zombies vs. The Army of Darkness #3. Additionally, Alex Power appears in the one-shot Marvel Zombies: Halloween #1.

=== MC2 ===
A possible future variant of Kate Power appears in A-Next.

=== Millennial Visions ===
Adult variants of the Power Pack appear in the one-shot Millennial Visions.

=== New Mutants ===
A possible future variant of Katie Power appears in The New Mutants #49. This version comes from a dystopian future ruled by Sunspot and acquired all of her siblings' powers after they were all killed years prior.

=== Renew Your Vows ===
An alternate universe iteration of the Power Pack appear in Amazing Spider-Man: Renew Your Vows. This version of the group are classmates of Spider-Man's daughter Annie Parker before their powers emerge and they are taken into S.H.I.E.L.D. custody.

=== X-Force ===
A girl from a possible future with all the Power Pack's powers named Francine Power / Powerpax appears in X-Force Annual #1.

== Collected editions ==
Title	Material collected	Format	Publication date	ISBN
Power Pack Origin Album	Power Pack (1984) #1–4	TPB	May 1988	978-0-87135-385-6
Power Pack Classic volume 1	Power Pack (1984) #1–10	TPB	July 2009	978-0-7851-3790-0
Power Pack Classic volume 2	Power Pack (1984) #11–17; Uncanny X-Men #195; Power Pack & Cloak and Dagger: Shelter from the Storm	TPB	May 2010	978-0-7851-4592-9
Power Pack Classic volume 3	Power Pack (1984) #18–26; Thor #363	TPB	March 2011	978-0-7851-5305-4
Power Pack Classic Omnibus	Power Pack (1984) #1–36; Uncanny X-Men #195, 205; Thor #363; X-Factor Annual 2; Power Pack & Cloak and Dagger: Shelter from the Storm; material from Strange Tales (1987) #13–14	Oversized hardcover	March 2020	978-1-302-92367-9
Power Pack Classic Omnibus volume 2	Power Pack (1984) #37–62; Excalibur (1988) #29; Power Pack Holiday Special (1992) #1; Power Pack (2000) #1-4; Fantastic Four (1998) #574; FF (2011) #15; Power Pack (2017) #63; Power Pack: Grow Up (2019) #1; material from Marvel Super Heroes (1990) #6; Marvel Fanfare (1982) #55	Oversized hardcover	June 2021	978-1-302-93036-3
Secret Wars II Omnibus	Power Pack (1984) #18; Secret Wars II #1–9; Uncanny X-Men #198, #202–203; The New Mutants #30, #36–37; Captain America #308; Iron Man #197; Fantastic Four #282, #285, #288, #316–319; Web of Spider-Man #6; Amazing Spider-Man #268, #273–274; Daredevil #223; Incredible Hulk #312; Avengers #260–261 and #265–266; Dazzler #40; Alpha Flight #28; Thing #30; Doctor Strange #74; Cloak and Dagger #4; Thor #363; Power Man and Iron Fist #121; Peter Parker, the Spectacular Spider-Man #111; Defenders #152; Quasar #8	Oversized hardcover	May 2009	978-0-7851-3111-3
Essential X-Men volume 6	Power Pack (1984) #27; X-Men #199–213, Annual #9; The New Mutants #46, Special Edition #1; X-Factor #9–11; Thor #373–374	TPB	September 2005	0-7851-1727-X
Essential X-Factor volume 1	Power Pack (1984) #27; Avengers #262; Fantastic Four #286; X-Factor #1–16, Annual #1; Thor #373–374	TPB	November 2005	0-7851-1886-1
X-Men: Mutant Massacre	Power Pack (1984) #27; Uncanny X-Men #210–214; The New Mutants #46; X-Factor #9–11; Thor #373–374; Daredevil #238	TPB	January 2010	0-7851-3805-6
X-Men: Fall of the Mutants Omnibus	Power Pack (1984) #35; Uncanny X-Men #220–227; The New Mutants (1983) #55–61; X-Factor (1986) #19–26; Captain America (1968) #339; Daredevil(1964) #252; Fantastic Four (1961) #312; Incredible Hulk (1968) #340	Oversized hardcover	October 2011	978-0-7851-5822-6
X-Men: Inferno Crossovers Omnibus	Power Pack (1984) #40, 42–44; Avengers #298–300; Fantastic Four #322–324; Amazing Spider-Man #311–313; Spectacular Spider-Man #146–148; Web of Spider-Man #47–48; Daredevil #262–263, 265; Excalibur #6–7; Cloak & Dagger #4	Oversized hardcover	September 2010	978-0-7851-4671-1
Acts of Vengeance Crossovers Omnibus	Power Pack (1984) #53; Uncanny X-Men #256–258; Fantastic Four #334–336; Wolverine #19–20; Dr. Strange, Sorcerer Supreme #11–13; Incredible Hulk #363; Punisher #28–29; Punisher War Journal #12–13; Marc Spector: Moon Knight #8–10; Daredevil #275–276; Alpha Flight #79–80; The New Mutants #84–86; X-Factor #49–50; Damage Control #1–4; and Web of Spider-Man #64–65	Oversized hardcover	August 2011	978-0-7851-4488-5
Power Pack: Pack Attack!	Power Pack (2005) #1–4	Digest TPB	2005	0-7851-1736-9
X-Men/Power Pack	X-Men/Power Pack #1–4	Digest TPB	2006	0-7851-1955-8
Avengers/Power Pack: Assemble!	Avengers/Power Pack: Assemble! #1–4	Digest TPB	2006	0-7851-2155-2
Spider-Man/Power Pack: Big-City Superheroes	Spider-Man/Power Pack #1–4	Digest TPB	2007	0-7851-2357-1
Hulk/Power Pack: Pack Smash	Hulk/Power Pack #1–4	Digest TPB	2007	0-7851-2490-X
Fantastic Four and Power Pack: Favorite Son	Fantastic Four and Power Pack #1–4	Digest TPB	2008	978-0-7851-2491-7
Iron Man/Power Pack: Armored and Dangerous	Iron Man/Power Pack #1–4	Digest TPB	2008	978-0-7851-2830-4
Power Pack: Day One	Power Pack: Day One #1–4	Digest TPB	2008	978-0-7851-3007-9
Wolverine/Power Pack: The Wild Pack	Wolverine/Power Pack #1–4	Digest TPB	2009	978-0-7851-2831-1
Skrulls Vs. Power Pack	Skrulls Vs. Power Pack #1–4	Digest TPB	2009	978-0-7851-3285-1
Thor and the Warriors Four	Thor and the Warriors Four #1–4	Digest TPB	2010	978-0-7851-4120-4
Power Pack: Powers That Be	Power Pack (2020) #1–5	TPB	June 2021	978-1-302-92436-2

Power Pack Classic volume 4 (ISBN 978-0-7851-6262-9) was scheduled to be released in March 2013 but was cancelled. It would have contained Power Pack (1984) #27–36 and material from Strange Tales (1987) #13–14.

== In other media ==
=== TV pilot ===
Power Pack
- Article image of the four Power siblings from Comics Scene #20 (Aug 1991)
- Genre: Action; Adventure; Science fiction; Superhero
- Based on: Power Pack by: Louise Simonson; June Brigman
- Starring: Nathaniel Moreau; Margot Finley; Bradley Machry; Jacelyn Holmes; Jonathan Whittaker; Cheryl Wilson
- Composers: Danny Elfman; Alan Menken; Mark Knopfler
- Country of origin: United States
- Original language: English

Production
- Executive producer: Jon Slan
- Running time: 27 minutes
- Production companies: New World Pictures; Paragon Entertainment Corporation; Marvel Entertainment (uncredited)

Original release
- Network: Fox
- Release: September 28, 1991

==== Plot ====
As the Power siblings get ready for a new school year, they must deal with typical kid issues while also balancing their lives as superpowered children when they learn of Dr. Mobius, a phantom that haunts an abandoned house.

==== Cast ====
- Nathaniel Moreau as Alexander "Alex" Power
- Margot Finley as Julie Power
- Bradley Machry as Jack Power
- Jacelyn Holmes as Katherine "Katie" Power
- Jonathan Whittaker as Dr. James "Jim" Power
- Cheryl Wilson as Margaret "Maggie" Power
- Daniel DeSanto as Eddie
- Christian Masten as Harlan
- Rachel Wilson as Tina Calloway
- Charlene DiPardo as Rhonda
- Greg Swanson as Dr. Mobius

==== Production ====
Following the cancellation of the original comic, Paragon Entertainment Corporation and New World Television developed Power Pack into a live-action show for NBC's Saturday Morning Kids block. While a pilot episode was made, the series was passed on and later picked up by Fox, which chose to broadcast it as a Saturday morning special, on September 28, 1991, rather than ordering an entire series. The 27-minute pilot has subsequently been aired on Fox Kids during the off-season. Minor alterations to the concept were made for the pilot, ranging from the children's parents being aware of their superhuman abilities, Julie's acceleration power being altered to her being able to move at superhuman speed and lacking the ability to fly, and the "cloud" aspect of Jack's density power being eliminated in favor of him being able to shrink in size. Additionally, the children did not wear costumes.

=== Other appearances ===
- The Power Pack make non-speaking cameo appearances in The Super Hero Squad Show episode "Support Your Local Sky-Father!".
- In 2000, a project involving the Power Pack, among other properties, was announced as part a joint venture between Marvel Entertainment and Artisan Entertainment.
