= X-Men Fairy Tales =

2006 Marvel mini-series

- Cover to X-Men Fairy Tales #1 (July 2006). Art by Sana Takeda.

Publication information
- Publisher: Marvel Comics
- Schedule: monthly
- Format: Limited series
- Publication date: July 2006-October 2006
- No. of issues: 4

Creative team
- Written by: C. B. Cebulski
- Artist: Sana Takeda
- Letterer: Tom Valente

The X-Men Fairy Tales is a four-part mini-series that was created by ex-editor C. B. Cebulski, with art by Sana Takeda. It was published by Marvel Comics in 2006.

The series retells the original X-Men comics through folk lore and fairy tales. It was the first of the Marvel Fairy Tales, which went to tell similar stories for other Marvel titles.

== Release information ==
When X-Men Fairy Tales Volume 1 came out, it was sold out by May 2006. Shortly thereafter Volume 2 hit the shelves on June 21, 2006.

== Part 1 ==
=== Specs ===
Release date	Written By	Art By	# of Pages
May 17, 2006	C.B.Cebulski	Sana Takeda	32 Full Color Pages

=== Description ===
This volume re-enacts the tale of Momotarō. It sets the X-Men into this story to play out the traditional roles of the characters within the original. Within the story, Momotaro has the abilities of the X-Man Cyclops, allowing him to shoot beams from his eyes. Because of this ability he remains in seclusion, until a great monk comes to him (symbolism as Professor X came to him during the original X-Men series) and convinces him to use his power for good. From this, they go off to defeat a horde of demons.

== Part 2 ==
=== Specs ===
Release date	Written By	Art By	# of Pages
June 21, 2006	C.B.Cebulski	Kyle Baker	32 Full Color Pages

=== Description ===
This volume retells the ancient story called "The Friendship of the Tortoise and the Eagle". It retells how Magneto and Professor Xavier originally met through the story of the fairy tale.

== Part 3 ==
=== Specs ===
Release date	Written By	Art By	# of Pages
July 7, 2006	C.B.Cebulski	Bill Sienkiewicz	32 Full Color Pages

=== Description ===
A blind Cyclops awakens the princess (Jean Grey) from her sleep, only to find that Wolverine is determined to keep her under her spell, or worse, dead.

== Part 4 ==
=== Specs ===
Release date	Written By	Art By	# of Pages
October, 2006	C.B.Cebulski	Kei Kobayashi	32 Full Color Pages

=== Description ===
Pulling upon some fairy tales that originated in New Orleans, the love between Gambit and Rogue is re-created, though the roles are reversed, with Rogue/Anna as the ghost-communicating thief and Gambit on the side of the law with his partner, Bishop. Mystique takes the form of the voodoo witch that sells Rogue's talent, along with her other daughter, Irene. Coming home after closing, Rogue is surprised to have a customer, Emma Frost asking for her services. It is then that Emma's intent is not to communicate with the dead, but to control them, and she, along with the members of Hellfire will stop at nothing do so.
