= Marvel Fairy Tales =

Term for three volumes of comic book limited series published by Marvel Comics

Marvel Fairy Tales is a term for three volumes of comic book limited series published by Marvel Comics and written by C. B. Cebulski with art by different artists each issue. Each of these series adapts fairytales and folk tales from around the world, using analogues of Marvel superheroes in place of the major characters. The series were published from 2006 to 2008 and were, in order, X-Men Fairy Tales, Spider-Man Fairy Tales, and Avengers Fairy Tales. A potential fourth series based on the Fantastic Four was mentioned as "in development" by Cebulski, but never released.

== X-Men Fairy Tales ==
X-Men Fairy Tales was the first such series, mixing folk tales with characters from X-Men comics. It ran from May 2006 to September 2006. Issue #1 quickly sold out.

=== Issues ===
1. (May 17, 2006, art by Sana Takeda) is a retelling of the Japanese legend of Momotarō, with Cyclops in the lead role.
2. (June 21, 2006, art by Kyle Baker) is a retelling of the African folk tale of "The Tortoise and the Eagle", with the tortoise representing Professor X and the eagle Magneto.
3. (July 7, 2006, art by Bill Sienkiewicz) is based on the European stories of the Brothers Grimm, with Jean Grey as a sleeping princess awoken by Cyclops. Featuring Wolverine.
4. (October 2006, art by Kei Kobayashi) adapts Cajun Voodoo tales, and stars Gambit, Rogue, and Mystique.

== Spider-Man Fairy Tales ==
Spider-Man Fairy Tales was the second of the Marvel Fairy Tales series and featured adaptations of characters from Spider-Man comics. It ran from May 2007 to October 2007.

=== Issues ===
1. (July 2007, art by Ricardo Tercio) adapts Little Red Riding Hood, featuring Mary Jane Watson as Red Riding Hood and Peter Parker as the Huntsman.
2. (August 2007, art by Niko Henrichon) adapts the African legend of Anansi, with Spider-Man as Anansi as he travels across the land fighting various elementals in the forms of the Fantastic Four.
3. (September 2007, art by Kei Kobayashi) adapts a Japanese ghost story featuring Venom as a Tsuchigumo-like villain.
4. (October 2007, art by Nick Dragotta and Mike Allred) a gender-reversed variation on the story of Cinderella, featuring Gwen Stacy as a princess and Peter Parker in the Cinderella role.

== Avengers Fairy Tales ==
Cebulski's third miniseries in the line: Avengers Fairy Tales, features characters from Avengers comics. It ran from May–August 2008. It differed from the other volumes in not retelling fairy tales or folk tales but adapting four children's novels.

=== Issues ===
1. (May 2008, art by João M. P. Lemos) adapts Peter and Wendy, with Captain America as Peter Pan; the Scarlet Witch as Wendy; Quicksilver as her brother; Wasp as Tinkerbell; Black Panther, Hawkeye, Iron Man, and Thor as the Lost Boys; and Klaw as Captain Hook.
2. (June 2008, art by Nuno Plati) adapts The Adventures of Pinocchio, with Vision as Pinocchio, Hank Pym as Geppetto, and Scarlet Witch as the Fairy with Turquoise Hair.
3. (August 2008, art by Takeshi Miyazawa) adapts Alice in Wonderland, with Cassie Lang as Alice and the rest of the Young Avengers as part of the story. Also in the story are Scott Lang as the Caterpillar, Tigra as the Cheshire Cat, and Ultron and Jocasta as knights.
4. (December 2008, art by Ricardo Tercio) adapts The Wizard of Oz, with She-Hulk as Dorothy, Captain America as the Cowardly Lion, Iron Man as the Tin Man, Thor as the Scarecrow, Magneto as the Wizard, and Scarlet Witch as the Wicked Witch of the West.
