= Future Foundation =

Group of fictional characters from the Marvel Universe

- Textless FF #1 variant cover by Daniel Acuña

Publication information
- Publisher: Marvel Comics
- First appearance: Fantastic Four #579 (July 2010)
- Created by: Jonathan Hickman (writer); Neil Edwards (artist); Steve Epting (artist)

In-story information
- Base(s): Baxter Building; Mobile
- Member(s): Current members: Bentley 23; Dragon Man; Korr; Leech; Artie Maddicks; Mik; Onome; Alex Power; Julie Power; Tong; Turg; Vil; Wu; Former members:Ahura; Ant-Man; Doctor Doom; Human Torch; Invisible Woman; Luna; Medusa; Mister Fantastic; Franklin Richards (future); Miss. Thing; Nathaniel Richards; She-Hulk; Valeria Richards; Valeria Richards (future); Spider-Man; Thing

The Future Foundation is a fictional organization appearing in American comic books published by Marvel Comics. Created by writer Jonathan Hickman, the team first appeared in Fantastic Four #579 (July 2010) and stars in the series FF, written by Hickman and illustrated by Steve Epting. The Future Foundation is a philanthropic organization created by Mister Fantastic dedicated to better serve humanity's future.

== Publication history ==
Jonathan Hickman published FF in May 2011 with various artists assisting him. The volume ran for 23 issues.

As part of Marvel NOW!, FF was relaunched with creative team of Matt Fraction and Mike Allred in November 2012 and ended with issue #16 in January 2014.

A new volume of Future Foundation was released by writer Jeremy Whitley in 2019, but was soon canceled after five issues due to low sales.

== Fictional history ==
After becoming discouraged by how Earth's scientists view science and its applications, Mister Fantastic forms a new group dedicated to create a better future for all of humanity. Following the death of the Human Torch, Mister Fantastic plans to mold the young and great minds he has gathered into a team that will form solutions to the world's problems.

Zero-G (Alex Power); Dragon Man; evolved Moloids Tong, Turg, Mik, and Korr; and Bentley 23 (a clone of the Wizard) are the first recruits to the organization. Artie Maddicks then joins the Future Foundation, as does Leech.

The organization next gains Mister Fantastic's father Nathaniel Richards followed by Uhari co-heirs Vii and Wuu. Spider-Man joins the team as well at a final request from Human Torch.

== Members ==
The Future Foundation consists of a combat team along with a science team, with some members being part of both groups. Other groups include a replacement group for the core members of the original Fantastic Four as well as a temporary supervillain group.

=== The Future Foundation ===
==== Current members ====
- Alex Power
- Julie Power
- Leech
- Artie Maddicks
- Bentley-23 - A clone of the Wizard
- Dragon Man
- Onome - The daughter of one of Wakanda's greatest engineers
- Vil - The female co-heir to the Uhari throne
- Wu - The male co-heir to the Uhari throne
- Mik - An evolved Moloid who identifies itself as a male
- Korr - An evolved Moloid who identified itself as a male
- Turg - An evolved Moloid who identified itself as a male
- Tong - An evolved Moloid who formerly identified itself as a male and now identifies as female

==== Former members ====
- Luna
- Medusa
- Mister Fantastic
- Invisible Woman
- Thing
- Human Torch
- Spider-Man
- Doctor Doom
- Valeria Richards
- Franklin Richards
  - Original Earth-616
  - Earth-10235
- Valeria Richards from Earth-10235
- Nathaniel Richards
- Ant-Man
- She-Hulk
- Adolf - The son of the Impossible Man
- Ms. Thing

=== Council of Doom ===
The following supervillain geniuses were recruited by Mister Fantastic and Doctor Doom to deal with the alternate Mister Fantastics:

- Diablo
- High Evolutionary
- Mad Thinker
- Wizard

== Other versions ==
=== Ultimate Marvel ===
The Future Foundation appears in a self-titled Ultimate Marvel series, written by Joshua Hale Fialkov and drawn by Mario Guevra. This version of the organization consists of Susan Storm, Falcon, Iron Man, Danny Ketch / Machine Man, and Phil Coulson. Additionally, a group of genetically-engineered humans created by the Maker called the "Children of Tomorrow" appear in Ultimate Comics: The Ultimates.

=== Secret Wars (2015) ===
A variation of the Future Foundation, referred to simply as the "Foundation", appears in Secret Wars. This version of the organization was established in the Battleworld domain of Doomstadt and consists of Valeria Richards, Dragon Man, Bentley-32, Minister Alex Powers, Psycho-Man, Nostradamus, and Nikola Tesla / Night Machine.

== In other media ==
=== Television ===
Spider-Man's Future Foundation uniform appears in Your Friendly Neighborhood Spider-Man. This version was developed by Oscorp.

=== Film ===
The Future Foundation appears in The Fantastic Four: First Steps.

=== Video games ===
- Spider-Man's Future Foundation uniform appears as an unlockable alternate skin in Spider-Man: Edge of Time.
- Spider-Man's Future Foundation uniform appears as an alternate skin in Ultimate Marvel vs. Capcom 3.
- An inverted version of Spider-Man's Future Foundation uniform appears as an unlockable skin in The Amazing Spider-Man.
- Mister Fantastic, Invisible Woman, the Thing, and Spider-Man's Future Foundation uniforms appear as unlockable alternate skins in Marvel: Avengers Alliance.
- Spider-Man, Mister Fantastic, Invisible Woman, the Thing, and Doctor Doom's Future Foundation uniforms appear as alternate skins in Marvel Super Hero Squad Online.
- The Fantastic Four's Future Foundation uniforms appear in Marvel Super War.
- Spider-Man, the Thing, Mister Fantastic, Invisible Woman, and Doctor Doom's Future Foundation uniforms appear as alternate skins in Marvel Heroes.
- Mister Fantastic, Invisible Woman, the Thing, and Spider-Man's Future Foundation uniforms appear as alternate skins in Lego Marvel Super Heroes.
- Spider-Man's Future Foundation uniform appears in Spider-Man Unlimited.
- Spider-Man's Future Foundation uniform appears as an alternate skin in Marvel's Spider-Man.
- Spider-Man's Future Foundation uniform appears as an unlockable alternate skin in Fortnite Battle Royale.
- Spider-Man and the Fantastic Four's Future Foundation uniforms appear as unlockable alternate skins in Marvel Rivals.

== Collected editions ==
| Title | Material collected | Publication date | ISBN |
|---|---|---|---|
| FF by Jonathan Hickman - Vol. 1: Tomorrow | FF #1-5 | September 7, 2011 | 978-0785151449 |
| FF by Jonathan Hickman - Vol. 2: Three Kings | FF #6-11 | February 8, 2012 | 978-0785157694 |
| FF by Jonathan Hickman - Vol 3: All Hope Lies in Doom | FF #12-16 | July 11, 2012 | 978-0785163121 |
| FF by Jonathan Hickman - Vol. 4: The Roommate Experiment | FF #17-23 | December 5, 2012 | 978-0785163145 |
| Fantastic Four by Jonathan Hickman: The Complete Collection Vol. 2 | FF #1-5, Fantastic Four #579-588 | September 10, 2019 | 978-1302919634 |
| Fantastic Four by Jonathan Hickman: The Complete Collection Vol. 3 | FF #6-16, Fantastic Four #600-604 | December 1, 2020 | 978-1302926687 |
| Fantastic Four By Jonathan Hickman: The Complete Collection Vol. 4 | FF #17-23, Fantastic Four #605-611, 605.1 | August 2, 2022 | 978-1302933586 |
| Fantastic Four by Jonathan Hickman Omnibus Vol. 1 | FF #1-5, Dark Reign: Fantastic Four #1-5, Fantastic Four #570-588, material from Dark Reign: The Cabal | October 15, 2013 | 978-1302932404 |
| Fantastic Four By Jonathan Hickman Omnibus Vol. 2 | FF #6-23, Fantastic Four #600-611, 605.1 | November 25, 2014 | 978-1302933845 |
| Fantastic Four Vol. 1: New Departures, New Arrivals | FF (vol. 2) #1-3, Fantastic Four (vol. 4) #1-3, material from Marvel Point One #1 | April 16, 2013 | 978-0785166597 |
| FF Vol. 1: Fantastic Faux | FF (vol. 2) #4-8 | July 30, 2013 | 978-0785166634 |
| FF Vol. 2: Family Freakout | FF (vol. 2) #9-16 | March 25, 2014 | 978-0785166641 |
| Fantastic Four by Matt Fraction Omnibus | FF (vol. 2) #1-16, Fantastic Four (vol. 4) #1-16, 5AU, material from Marvel Point One #1 | February 17, 2015 | 978-0785191100 |
| Future Foundation | Future Foundation #1-5, material from Fantastic Four (vol. 6) #12 | February 18, 2020 | 978-1302920982 |
