= X-Infernus =

Four-issue comic book mini-series

Publication information
- Publisher: Marvel Comics
- Schedule: Monthly
- Format: Mini-series
- Genre: Superhero
- Publication date: February – May 2009
- No. of issues: 4
- Main character(s): Magik; Colossus; Nightcrawler; Pixie; Mercury; Rockslide; Witchfire; Wolverine

Creative team
- Written by: C. B. Cebulski
- Penciller: Giuseppe Camuncoli
- Inker: Jesse Delperdang
- Letterer: Dave Lanphear
- Colorist: Marte Gracia
- Editor(s): Axel Alonso; Daniel Ketchum; Nick Lowe; Joe Quesada

Collected editions
- Hardcover: ISBN 0-7851-3947-8

X-Infernus is a four-issue comic book mini-series that started in December 2008. Written by C. B. Cebulski, with art by Giuseppe Camuncoli, it was a sequel to "Inferno". It sees the return of the character Magik searching Limbo for her soul.

== Plot summary ==
=== Chapter One: Soul Survivors ===
Colossus is wondering why the X-Men are doing nothing to save his sister Illyana from Limbo. Cyclops says they have tried and will keep trying, but Limbo is still sealed off. While in Limbo, Magik attacks various other demons looking for her Soulsword and the original Bloodstone amulet. Belasco's daughter Witchfire reveals that she is the current owner of the amulet. She vows to take her father's place as ruler of Limbo and kill Magik.

At the X-Men's base in San Francisco, Mercury and Rockslide are watching Nightcrawler and Pixie train. Pixie summons her Soul Dagger, altering her personality, and stabs Nightcrawler in the chest. Beast finds that Pixie's Soul Dagger is stuck in Nightcrawler's chest; when Pixie removes the dagger, she finds that Magik's Soulsword is also inside Nightcrawler's body. Sensing the Soulsword, Magik teleports into the X-Men's base to reclaim it.

=== Chapter Two: This Mortal Coil ===
Magik stands before Pixie, Mercury, Rockslide, and Beast, demanding Pixie hand over her Soulsword. She takes out Mercury, Rockslide, and Beast, and engages Pixie in combat. Pixie refuses to hand over the sword, but Magik overpowers her and regains her sword, taking on a more humanoid appearance. Magik strikes Colossus when he calls her 'Snowflake' but senses something is wrong when she does not feel anything. She teleports back to Limbo, telling her brother that he cannot save her; she has to save herself. The X-Men gather the wounded, and Pixie attempts to go after Magik but Nightcrawler stops her. Pixie breaks out in tears and apologizes for stabbing him.

Colossus says he is going after Magik. The other X-Men have a way to get to Limbo (through Pixie). Cyclops agrees with him and puts together a team consisting of Colossus, Pixie, Wolverine, Mercury and Rockslide, with Nightcrawler in charge due to Pixie and Colossus's personal stake in the mission. Pixie teleports the group into Limbo, where they are attacked by hostile demons.

=== Chapter Three: What You Wish For ===
Magik confronts Witchfire at her castle. Witchfire claims everything Belasco ever owned, including Magik's soul. After a quick battle, Magik is taken down by Witchfire, who claims the second Bloodstone amulet. Witchfire stabs Magik in the chest, injuring her and knocking her out. Witchfire takes Pixie's Bloodstone and adds it to the original amulet, giving her four Bloodstones and a more demonic appearance.

Elsewhere in Limbo, Nightcrawler, Mercury, Colossus, Rockslide, Pixie, and Wolverine are fighting their way through the demons. Pixie, Mercury, and Rockslide are horrified at how brutal the older X-Men are towards the demons. An octopus-like creature attacks Nightcrawler until Pixie jumps in and kills it with her soul dagger. Colossus shatters Rockslide, who reforms from Limbo rock, and Wolverine is stabbed in the chest with a sword that sends him into a berserker rage and he kills all the demons that stand in their way. After Colossus removes the sword from Wolverine, they stumble upon Belasco's castle. After trying to decide how to get there, Pixie senses the darkness within her suddenly growing and she teleports off to the castle by herself.

After arriving at the castle, Pixie happens upon a mirror that shows herself transformed into a demon. Pixie freaks out and runs into the throne room, where she finds Magik and Witchfire. Witchfire grabs Pixie by the throat, forces her to become her new apprentice, and begins forging a new Bloodstone from Pixie's soul.

Nightcrawler teleports the X-Men into the throne room. Once there, Witchfire turns Colossus and Wolverine against Mercury and Rockslide. Nightcrawler notices Magik chained to a pillar. She asks him to stab her with the Pixie's soul dagger, as it is the only way to free her, and he is the only one to do it because he is attuned to magic. She apologizes and he stabs her. At that moment, Colossus punches Nightcrawler and Witchfire finishes making her fifth and final Bloodstone from Pixie.

=== Chapter Four: Soul's End ===
Nightcrawler slips past Colossus and Wolverine to remove the Soul Dagger from Magik, retrieving her Soulsword and using them both to free his teammates from their enchantment. He then sees Witchfire finish making the fifth Bloodstone out of Pixie's soul and slices off Witchfire's hand. But she brushes him away with a magic blast and regrows her hand while Nightcrawler consoles Pixie and tells her to use the dagger to free Magik because of their mutual connection. Witchfire uses the Bloodstones to summon the Elder Gods to her aid, but Magik and her friends interrupt her. While the X-Men battle the Elder Gods, Magik fights Witchfire, who blasts her. Magik is sheathed inside Mercury's magic-resistant skin, and they slash Witchfire and strip her of the amulet containing the Bloodstones. Magik and Pixie use their blades to smash the amulet, but Witchfire escapes the crumbling castle with four Bloodstones into the Elder Gods' dimension. Pixie is despondent over losing more of her soul and tries to attack Magik with her Soul Dagger, but the glowing stone in its blade indicates that the stolen piece of her soul is inside it. Pixie flies away in tears.

Magik is upset that she failed to recover her soul and fears for her humanity. Nightcrawler consoles her by telling her of his half-demonic parentage and how he has decided he has a soul regardless of that. Colossus tries to console his sister, but when he sees the horns still on her head, she teleports all of them back to the X-Men's compound and then tries to leave. Colossus, Magik's friends from the New Mutants, and Cyclops convince Magik to stay.

== Collected editions ==
The series has been collected into a single volume:

- X-Infernus (152 pages, July 2009, ISBN 0-7851-3947-8)
