= Rocketeers (comics) =

Fictional characters in Marvel Universe

Publication information
- Publisher: Marvel Comics
- First appearance: Daredevil #131 (March 1976); Dire Wraith version: Rom #21 (August 1981)
- Created by: Marv Wolfman; Bob Brown

The Rocketeers is a fictional organization appearing in American comic books published by Marvel Comics.

== Fictional organization history ==
The Rocketeers are beings who wear special costumes with rockets on their backs, enabling the wearers to fly. The Rocketeers also fire rockets as weapons from portable launching equipment they carry. The Rocketeers' costumes and equipment were designed by the Dire Wraiths for use against the Spaceknights of Galador. The Rocketeers' costumes are, however, inferior imitations of their prototype, which was worn by the Torpedo until his death.

The first group of Rocketeers was a collection of human criminals who were unwittingly being used by the Dire Wraiths to test the costumes. Later, Dire Wraiths in human form wore the costumes themselves.
