= Turbo (comics) =

- Michiko Musashi

Publication information
- Publisher: Marvel Comics
- First appearance: (Musashi) The New Warriors #28 (October 1992) (Jeffries) The New Warriors #33 (March 1993)
- Created by: Evan Skolnick; Dwight Coye; James Brock

In-story information
- Alter ego: Michiko "Mickey" Musashi; Michael Brent "Mike" Jeffries
- Team affiliations: (Musashi); Avengers Academy; Loners (Both); New Warriors
- Notable aliases: (Musashi): Torpedo Sue
- Abilities: Suit grants: Flight; Energy disruption; Air blasts; Superhuman strength

Turbo is the name of two superheroes appearing in American comic books published by Marvel Comics. Michiko "Mickey" Musashi debuted in The New Warriors #28 (October 1992) and her ally Michael "Mike" Jeffries in The New Warriors #33.

== Fictional character biography ==
The Torpedo armor was created by the Dire Wraiths, their attempt to counter the cybernetic armor of the Spaceknights. They employed a human scientist to develop the armor, combining both Wraith and human technology. It had collapsible turbines mounted around the wrists and ankles, allowing the user to fly and fire powerful blasts of air. Upon discovering that the suit was going to be used for criminal purposes, its inventor stole it, but was mortally wounded while escaping. He gave it to the first person he stumbled onto, Brock Jones, who used it to battle crime as the superhero Torpedo.

Jones eventually decides to hide himself and his family from the people seeking the armor, and comes to live in the town of Clairton, West Virginia. There, he encounters Rom the Space Knight and learns about the Wraiths. Jones agrees to help Rom protect the town from the Wraiths, and Rom alters his armor so its lenses would allow the user to see a Dire Wraith's true form.

Jones is eventually found and killed by the Wraiths. His relative Michael later finds his armor and gives it to his friend Michiko so she can use it as a Halloween costume. When Michiko dons the armor, it begins broadcasting a wavelength that allows human scientists from the lab that developed the armor to track it. They attack Michiko and Mike at a college costume party, where Michiko discovers the suit's abilities and fends off her attackers.

=== The New Warriors ===
Mickey and Mike begins sharing the armor, with Mike wishing to be a superhero, while Mickey uses it to travel the world. Although she considered heroism as a "ridiculous calling", Mickey does not wish to see innocent people hurt when she could have prevented it. After a gang of weapon smugglers under the command of Sea Urchin involve a civilian in their dealings, Mickey sets out to stop them and encounters the New Warriors, who are also tailing the criminals. Mickey helps the Warriors to bring the gang down, capturing Sea Urchin.

Mike encounters the Warriors as Turbo when Darkling attacks Manhattan with the energies of the Darkforce Dimension. Both he and Mickey are attacked by the Air Force while training with Nova. Mickey becomes a reserve Warrior, helping rescue the team twice alongside other back-up heroes, before being offered full-time membership.

On one mission, the Warriors battle Volx, the queen of the Dire Wraiths, who recognizes the Torpedo armor and desires to steal it. She tracks the armor to Mike and kills him, absorbing his memories. Posing as Mike, Volx tricks the Warriors into giving her the armor, which she used in a plot to depower Earth's superhuman population until she is killed by Night Thrasher.

Mickey later meets and falls in love with Dalton Beck. Beck is later revealed to be Firestrike, a member of the armored criminal team Heavy Mettle. When the Warriors clash with Heavy Mettle, Firestrike turns on his allies and employer to protect Turbo. He is subsequently put in the Federal Witness Protection Program, separating him from Turbo.

=== Excelsior (Loners) ===
Deciding that she would do more good with her education in journalism than adventuring, Mickey retires the Torpedo armor. With the help of Phil Urich, she is employed at the Los Angeles Times. She later quits this job to relocate to New York for reasons unexplained. Mickey goes on to found Excelsior, a support group for retired teenage superheroes. The members of Excelsior are featured in the series Loners.

Alongside Julie Power and the other members of the Loners, Mickey is inducted into the Avengers Academy by Hawkeye after the school moves into the former headquarters of the West Coast Avengers.

== Powers and abilities ==
Mickey Mushashi and Mike Jeffries are both normal humans with no superhuman powers. As Turbo, they both wear a helmet and battle suit previously worn by Torpedo, and invented by the second Torpedo, Michael Stivak, employing both Earth and Dire Wraith technology.

The Torpedo battle suit is commanded via cybernetic circuitry built into the cowl/headpiece and bonds to its wearer allowing for greater degrees of control depending on the wearer's individual body chemistry compatibility and skill in manipulating the cybernetic bond, determined by the degree to which his or her brain pattern interacts with its technology. Brock Jones, the suit's first heroic user and the third Torpedo, had a sufficient degree of compatibility and skill to access most functions of the suit. Mickey, however, possesses a far greater natural compatibility and this, combined with her greater length of time using the suit, has enabled her to access functions that Brock could not, such as the suit's limited ability to reconfigure itself cosmetically according to the wearer's wishes. The helmet and suit are both useless without one another.

The Torpedo battle suit allows Mickey to fly at speeds up to, and including, supersonic levels. While in flight, the suit generates a low-level force field to protect her from the adverse physical stress of moving at such speeds; it also provides a great deal of durability for combat applications, and can disperse radiation directed against it.

Using the small nuclear-powered turbines built into the gauntlets and boots of the suit, Mickey is able to project a pulsed concussive force blast nicknamed a "Turbo Punch" which is essentially a jet-powered punch, enabling her to strike opponents or objects with a tremendous amount of force. Using a dual-fisted double Turbo Punch delivers force equal to a full-powered punch from a superhuman with Class 100 strength. The wearer can regulate these hyper-punches so as to strike a person without causing serious injury. The wearer can also use these turbines to create blasts of high-speed air, projecting both wide wind gusts and narrow gusts and simulating concussive force.

Assisted by the power of the turbo jets, the suit is capable of providing the wearer with superhuman strength, as well. The level of superhuman strength conferred is again based on the wearer's compatibility with the suit and familiarity with its functions. Brock Jones was capable of lifting (pressing) approximately one ton; Mickey is able to optimally lift (press) 20 tons.

Built into the suit's visor is a device able to detect Dire Wraiths (a divergent branch of the Skrulls), no matter what form they take, that was given to Brock Jones by Rom the Spaceknight in order to better protect the town of Clairton, West Virginia during the Wraiths' attempted conquest of the Earth.

== Other versions ==
An alternate universe version of Mickey Musashi / Turbo appears in House of M: Avengers as a member of the Wolfpack.

== In other media ==
The Michiko Musashi incarnation of Turbo appears in the Moon Girl and Devil Dinosaur episode "Family Matters", voiced by Erika Ishii. This version got her costume from a yard sale after trying to find something to cosplay as. Upon realizing that the suit had powers, she decided to become a superhero, though she became estranged from her mother and gained an arch-enemy in Silvermane.
