= Phil Urich =

Fictional character created by Marvel Comics

Phil Urich Green Goblin / Hobgoblin / Goblin Knight/King
- Phil Urich in Green Goblin #13 (October 1996). Art by Joshua Hood.

Publication information
- Publisher: Marvel Comics
- First appearance: As Green Goblin: Web of Spider-Man #125 (June 1995); As Phil Urich: Green Goblin #1 (October 1995); As Hobgoblin: The Amazing Spider-Man #649 (January 2011); As Goblin Knight: The Superior Spider-Man #16 (October 2013); As Goblin King: The Amazing Spider-Man #5 (October 2014)
- Created by: Terry Kavanagh; Steven Butler

In-story information
- Full name: Philip Benjamin Urich
- Species: Human mutate
- Place of origin: New York City
- Team affiliations: Loners; Goblin Nation
- Notable aliases: Green Goblin, Hobgoblin, Goblin Knight, Goblin King
- Abilities: As Green Goblin: Superhuman strength, speed, stamina, durability and reflexes Enhanced intellect Ultrasonic scream Use of goblin-themed weapons and paraphernalia As Hobgoblin: Superhuman strength, speed, stamina, durability, reflexes and senses Enhanced intellect Ultrasonic scream Wears a costume with wings on the back Use of goblin-themed weapons and a flaming sword

Philip Benjamin "Phil" Urich (/ˈjʊərɪk/) is a fictional character appearing in American comic books published by Marvel Comics. He first appeared in Web of Spider-Man #125 (June 1995). He was a superhero as the Green Goblin, and a supervillain as the Hobgoblin. He was later crowned the Goblin Knight before dubbing himself the Goblin King.

== Publication history ==
The character first appeared in Web of Spider-Man #125 (June 1995) as the Green Goblin. Phil Urich's identity and origin was revealed in Green Goblin #1 (October 1995). The character later first appeared in The Amazing Spider-Man #649 (January 2011) as the Hobgoblin.

== Fictional character biography ==
=== Heroic Green Goblin ===
Phil Urich's first appearance as Green Goblin in Web of Spider-Man #125 (June 1995). Art by Steven Butler.

Phil Urich is the nephew of Ben Urich, an employee of the Daily Bugle. After stumbling upon one of Harry Osborn's old Goblin hideouts, Urich finds a mask that gives him strength equivalent to the Green Goblin without the psychosis given by the original Goblin formula. Following Harry's death, Urich tries to gain a reputation as a superhero version of Green Goblin. During a battle against a Sentinel, Urich's glider is destroyed and his mask is damaged, forcing him to retire.

Urich forms a superhero self-help group with Mickey Musashi in order to prevent teenagers from becoming superheroes, and to help young former superheroes get over their pasts, attempting to convince them and others that their powers had damaged their lives. Urich suffers a mental breakdown after watching Chris Powell and Musashi share a celebratory kiss, having apparently convinced himself that he and Musashi had feelings for each other when she only saw him as a friend.

=== Villainous Hobgoblin ===
Phil Urich as Hobgoblin. Art by Stefano Caselli.

Urich is next seen in the Big Time storyline in New York helping out his uncle at the new Front Line offices. He develops a crush on co-worker Norah Winters, who is looking into Goblin Gangs for a story. Urich goes to one of the old Goblin hideouts, hoping to find something there to impress Winters. He encounters Daniel Kingsley (posing as the original Hobgoblin), who is also looking for some new Goblin technology. Kingsley is about to kill him when Urich snaps and uses his Lunatic Laugh to incapacitate Kingsley. Using the fire sword that Kingsley had just found, Urich decapitates Kingsley and steals the new Goblin equipment from Norman Osborn's secret lair. Urich then assumes the Hobgoblin identity for himself now operating as a supervillain.

=== Goblin Knight ===
When the Superior Spider-Man raids Shadowland, Urich is left to fend for himself while the Kingpin escapes. Urich escapes, encountering Spider-Bots which do not detect him. Following the assault on Shadowland, Urich goes to Tinkerer and requests upgrades to his gear to combat Superior Spider-Man. Despite Urich's efforts, Superior Spider-Man publicly reveals Urich as Hobgoblin. Urich is freed from a prison transport by Menace and brought to the Goblin Nation, where he assumes the identity of Goblin Knight.

=== Goblin King ===
Urich assumes the identity of the Goblin King, succeeding Norman Osborn. Having escaped prison under undisclosed circumstances during the "Go Down Swinging" storyline, Urich raids one of Osborn's old gentlemen's clubs to acquire the Goblin weaponry Osborn stored there. Osborn, currently wielding the Carnage symbiote, kills Urich by tearing his heart out. Urich resurrects himself using the Goblin serum, but his body is slowly rotting away.

== Powers and abilities ==
=== As Green Goblin ===
Due to ingestion of a modified version of Norman Osborn's "Goblin Formula", Urich gains superhuman strength (able to lift upwards of 9 tons), stamina, durability, speed, and reflexes. However, he is unable to access these abilities without the unknown catalyst provided by the Goblin mask he wears. He also possesses a "Lunatic Laugh" capable of creating sound waves disorienting to most people.

As the Goblin, Urich wears an alternate/spare Goblin costume composed of a chain-mail mesh capable of deflecting small arms fire. He travels on a bat-shaped, one-man, rocket-propelled "Goblin Glider". Like other Goblin gliders, it is armed with heat-seeking missiles, machine guns, and retractable blades. Other weapons Urich typically uses are incendiary Pumpkin Bombs capable of melting through 3 inches (76 mm) of steel, smoke and gas-emitting bombs with an appearance like a ghost, razor-edged bat-shaped boomerangs and gloves woven with micro-circuited filaments capable of discharging nearly 1,000 volts of electricity. Most of this equipment was destroyed or rendered inoperable during Urich's battle with a Sentinel.

=== As Hobgoblin ===
As the Hobgoblin, Urich wears an orange Hobgoblin costume with wings on the back that allow him to fly without the use of a Goblin Glider and he took Roderick Kingsley's mask as his own. He uses the traditional Pumpkin Bombs all Green Goblins and Hobgoblins before him have used, but he also has a new flaming sword. He still retains his "Lunatic Laugh" from when he was the Goblin and he also has superhuman strength, speed, durability, stamina, reflexes and senses, and enhanced intellect. For unknown reasons, he no longer needs his mask to activate this power. With the help of Reverbium, his "Lunatic Laugh" was able to cause a building to collapse.

== Reception ==
- In 2021, Screen Rant included Phil Urich in their "10 Best Marvel Legacy Villains Who Lived Up To Their Predecessor" list.

== Other versions ==
An alternate universe version of Phil Urich from Earth-982 appears in the MC2 imprint. This version is a forensic scientist who is married to Meredith Campbell and is aware of Peter Parker and Spider-Girl's secret identities. He later resumes the Goblin identity, first under the Golden Goblin name, then as the Green Goblin with Normie Osborn's assistance. Urich is also a founding member of the new New Warriors.

== In other media ==
The Phil Urich incarnation of the Hobgoblin received a figure in the "Amazing Spider-Man" HeroClix set.

== Collected editions ==
=== Green Goblin ===
Title	Material collected	Date published	ISBN
Green Goblin: A Lighter Shade of Green	Green Goblin #1-13, Web of Spider-Man #125, Spectacular Spider-Man #225 and Amazing Scarlet Spider #2.	September 14, 2011	978-0785157571

=== Hobgoblin ===
Title	Material collected	Date published	ISBN
Axis: Carnage & Hobgoblin	AXIS: Hobgoblin #1-3 and AXIS: Carnage #1-3	March 3, 2015	978-0785193111
