= Julie Power =

Marvel Comics superhero

- Julie Power as depicted in Avengers and Power Pack Assemble! #1 (June 2006). Art by GuriHiru.

Publication information
- Publisher: Marvel Comics
- First appearance: Power Pack #1 (May 1984)
- Created by: Louise Simonson; June Brigman

In-story information
- Alter ego: Julie Power
- Species: Human mutate
- Team affiliations: Power Pack; Avengers Academy; Future Foundation
- Notable aliases: Mistress of Density; Rainbow Girl; Lightspeed; Starstreak; Molecula
- Abilities: Superhuman speed and durability; Solid rainbow trail generation; Teleportation; Flight

Julie Power, also known as Mistress of Density, Rainbow Girl, Lightspeed, Starstreak and Molecula, is a superhero appearing in American comic books published by Marvel Comics. Created by Louise Simonson and June Brigman, the character first appeared in Power Pack #1 (May 1984).

Julie, alongside her siblings, are a group of young superheroes known as the Power Pack. The group gained their superpowers from a dying alien, with Julie gaining the ability to fly at superhuman speeds. (Note: The abilities of the children would be swapped throughout their history.) Julie would later go on to join the Avengers Academy and Future Foundation. She came out as bisexual in 2011, and has dated fellow superheroes Rikki Barnes and Karolina Dean.

== Publication history ==
Julie Power featured in all 62 issues of Power Pack published by Marvel Comics between 1984 and 1991. Between issues #1 and #25 of the original Power Pack series, Julie starred as the alter-ego of the superhero Lightspeed, but her superhero codename changed to Molecula when she gained her brother Jack's powers during the course of a storyline. She continued as Molecula between issues #25—52 until she regained her original powers and superhero name, which she retained until Power Pack's cancellation with issue #62. Julie later appeared in both the 1992 Power Pack Holiday Special and Power Pack vol. 2 miniseries "Peer Pressure", which was published in 2000, at some point changing her superhero name to Starstreak in the intervening years. During this publishing hiatus, her only appearances were brief cameos in New Warriors.

Outside the Power Pack series of comics, she has since appeared in Runaways (vol. 2) and the Runaways spin-off title Loners, and as a background character when that team later appeared in the miniseries War of Kings: Darkhawk (though she is not identified specifically at any point during this series). Julie appeared as a regular character in Avengers Academy from issue #20 (Dec. 2011) through its final issue #39 (Jan. 2013). Julie has also appeared in several alternate continuity titles such as Exiles, Marvel Zombies vs. The Army of Darkness and various Power Pack miniseries aimed at younger readers. Julie appears as a main character in Future Foundation, dating Rikki Barnes, and Aromancing of Gwendolyn Poole, dating Gwen Poole.

== Fictional character biography ==
Julie Power was born in Richmond, Virginia, to Dr. James Power and Margaret Power. She was a founding member of the superhero team Power Pack. The second oldest of the four Power siblings, she was 10 years old when she was given her powers by Aelfyre Whitemane, a dying Kymellian noble. She continued to operate with Power Pack through their entire history, later relocating to Los Angeles to live on her own after quitting the team in unrevealed circumstances.

Julie is the only Power family member who had a birthday happen within the comic series, turning 11 years old. In the second volume of Runaways, Julie is nebulously identified as being an "ex-teenager", but in the later Loners #4, Julie identifies herself as being 17 years old. In the letter column of Avengers Academy #31, Julie is identified as being about 19 years old.

=== Power Pack ===
After the events of Power Pack #1–5 which detailed the team's origin, the Power family moved from Virginia to New York City. There, Power Pack encountered other superheroes such as Spider-Man, and Cloak and Dagger. They also met Franklin Richards, and encountered the New Mutants. Julie's powers were later siphoned by the Snark Jakal; when returned, her powers were exchanged with those of her brother Jack, and she became Molecula. Eventually, she regained her original powers and resumed her original codename.

Julie was perhaps the most "normal" of the Power siblings. When she was not in "superhero mode" Julie could be quite shy and quiet; in several instances, she was bothered by bullies at school. Her solo storylines often involved regular "kid issues" such as babysitting and cheating on tests. Julie is also a voracious reader, and was frequently seen reading, carrying or quoting books, even graduating elementary school with honors in English. She frequently stepped into a maternal role with her siblings, sewing and washing the team's costumes, caring for Katie and Franklin Richards and attempting to restore peace during conflicts.

=== Excelsior and Loners ===
Julie's personality detailed above changed during unrevealed circumstances and she was reintroduced during the 'Runaways: True Believers' story-arc as a flighty, naive, wannabe actress who lacked worldly experience despite her many adventures with Power Pack. It is initially revealed in Runaways that because of her time with Power Pack, Julie decided to retire from super-heroics because she had missed out on having a normal childhood, though this later changes to her retiring from super-heroics to protect the privacy of her family and focus on developing a private life of her own away from prying eyes, and so she moved to Los Angeles to seek fame as an actress. This also later changes to her retiring from super-heroics to develop an identity of her own away from her family or other superheroes, prompting her to join the superhero group Excelsior. However, she (as well as the others within the group) agree to go on a mission offered by Rick Jones (though they do not know his identity at the time) to return the Runaways to the foster care from which they had escaped at the conclusion of their first series in exchange for one million dollars and a refitted Quinjet. Though this initial mission for the fledgling Excelsior team was a failure, they spend the next few months continuing to pursue the Runaways regardless, before discontinuing their pursuit and deciding never to use their powers ever again in unrevealed circumstances that occurred sometime before the beginning of the Loners miniseries, but which could be related to the events of "Civil War".

During a misunderstanding between Hollow and Ricochet, Julie appears without warning or explanation and is stabbed by Hollow. She claims that her 'alien metabolism' allows her to recover quickly from the wound, though it is not explained how her healing ability works now that she is separated from her siblings, as physical contact between them is required to heal grievous wounds.

Julie reveals to the group that her flighty personality and seemingly low intelligence is really a facade that she adopted when she moved to California, that she has merely been pretending to be unintelligent for the preceding two years in order to fit in with the rest of her teammates, and also that she has not registered with authorities as an active superhuman. Despite admitting her flighty persona is an affectation, Julie continues to act exactly as before for the remaining issues of Loners, and in the final issue's closing montage is seen playing absentmindedly with her hair much as she does in issue #4 when suggesting she is merely playing a part for the benefit of others.

=== Avengers Academy and the Runaways ===
Julie was seen, among the other young heroes, to be arriving on the new campus for the Avengers Academy. She is attending at the Academy as both a student and a teacher's assistant, under Quicksilver's tutelage. When fellow Academy member Striker confides to her that he is gay, she confirms that she is bisexual. During an earlier encounter with the Runaways, Julie and Karolina Dean express a close personal interest in each other in the middle of combat before they are interrupted by Molly Hayes. Following a later joint mission of the Avengers Academy and the Runaways, Julie and Karolina agree to go on a date, and eventually they end up being romantically involved.

Sometime afterwards, but Karolina's lack of commitment to their relationship created friction between them. In her despondent mood, Julie ended up consuming a magical cupcake originally given to Molly Hayes by her new schoolfriend, Abigail, a 13-year-old girl rendered ageless by a gift from the Enchantress. Eating the cupcake regressed Julie to a 13-year-old herself. Though the problem was fixed by an antidote the Enchantress had provided, Julie nevertheless broke up with Karolina.

=== Future Foundation ===
When circumstances prompted Julie to be drawn in to assist the Future Foundation when they were under threat, she revealed her recent run of bad luck to Alex, who apologized for not being there for his sister through her coming out and bad break-up. To help Julie get back on her feet, Alex offered her a position as a teacher with the Future Foundation. During a mission in a space prison to help reassemble the disintegrated Molecule Man, Julie encountered the reality-displaced Rikki Barnes, which resulted in a mutual romantic attraction. After breaking up with Nikki, Julie then embarked on a whirlwind romance with Gwen Poole.

== Powers and abilities ==
Julie's original power and that most associated with the character, was unaided flight by means of rapid forward propulsion that left a highly visible tri-colored band of light in her wake. Julie never flew at the speed of light as her codename suggested, and her top speed remains unknown, but it was supposed by her brother Alex on one occasion that she had broken the sound barrier.

Julie gained the density powers previously held by her brother Jack for a time and operated under the name Molecula. As Molecula, Julie can create force fields and bubbles, the latter of which can be employed to cushion herself or others from falls. Julie also learned to make herself taller and larger, though she still retained the same mass and would become tired when increasing her height and stature for long periods of time. Julie eventually regained her original acceleration powers and gained the ability to teleport large distances without any visible sign of exhaustion.

In unrevealed circumstances at some point between the Power Pack (2000) miniseries and her reappearances in both the second Runaways series and the Loners miniseries, after returning to her original codename once again; Julie learned to refine her powers so she could now hover in the air without having to accelerate to stay aloft, and could also now physically stand on her own rainbow trail, use it as an impromptu cushion against falls, or even as a hammock.

Along with her siblings, Julie possesses Kymellian healing powers. Julie is the first Power sibling to use this ability, albeit unconsciously, when her broken arm mysteriously heals quickly during the Pack's initial conflict with the Snarks. Later in the series she heals herself automatically, after switching to cloud form and back, when her legs are seriously injured during a battle with the mutant team Trash. When her brother Jack calls attention to it during the battle, Julie answered, "Yeah, that happens sometimes".

With her siblings, Julie owns a Kymellian smartship, Friday. The ship acts as an unofficial team advisor and accompanied the Pack on several missions. As with other members of Power Pack, it is not seen during Julie's appearances in Loners - though she does mention Friday in passing during her first mission with (what was then known as) Excelsior on their search for the Runaways.

=== Equipment ===
Julie wears a costume of unstable molecules created by Friday. The costume exists in an extra-dimensional space known as "Elsewhere" until summoned by voice command (the wearer would say the words "costume on!"). The costume also houses a communicator which is used to communicate with Friday, and is later modified to include a mask. As with all the team's costumes, the pockets of the costume can be used as an access point to Elsewhere itself, where the cartoon-like creatures known simply as "The Tailors" reside in a colorful wonderland of talking dinosaurs, enchanted forests, mad monarchs, surreal architecture and malleable physical laws.

== Reception ==
=== Critical response ===
Deirdre Kaye of Scary Mommy called Julie Power a "role model" and a "truly heroic" female character. Stacie Rook of Screen Rant included Julie Power in their "10 LGBTQ+ Marvel Heroes That Should Join The MCU" list. Comic Book Resources ranked Julie Power 3rd in their "10 Fastest Marvel Sidekicks" list, and 9th in their "Marvel Comics: 10 Most Powerful Students At Avengers Academy" list.

== Other versions ==
=== Avengers and Power Pack Assembled ===
An alternate timeline version of Julie Power appears in Avengers and Power Pack Assembled.

=== House of M ===
An alternate universe version of Julie Power appears in House of M as a member of the Wolfpack.

=== Exiles: Days of Then and Now ===
An alternate universe version of Julie Power appears in Exiles: Days of Then and Now as a member of Quentin Quire's team.

=== Millennial Visions ===
An alternate universe version of Julie Power appears in the one-shot Millennial Visions. This version is a 30-year-old researcher for SETI. She is depicted as being the most stable of the four Power siblings, who are estranged from each other, and reunites them to fight the Snarks again.

=== Marvel Zombies ===
A zombified alternate universe version of Julie Power appears in Marvel Zombies vs. The Army of Darkness.

== Collected editions ==
Title	Material collected	Format	Publication date	ISBN
Power Pack Origin Album	Power Pack (1984) #1–4	TPB	May 1988	978-0-87135-385-6
Power Pack Classic volume 1	Power Pack (1984) #1–10	TPB	July 2009	978-0-7851-3790-0
Power Pack Classic volume 2	Power Pack (1984) #11–17; Uncanny X-Men #195; Power Pack & Cloak and Dagger: Shelter from the Storm	TPB	May 2010	978-0-7851-4592-9
Power Pack Classic volume 3	Power Pack (1984) #18–26; Thor #363	TPB	March 2011	978-0-7851-5305-4
Power Pack Classic Omnibus	Power Pack (1984) #1–36; Uncanny X-Men #195, 205; Thor #363; X-Factor Annual 2; Power Pack & Cloak and Dagger: Shelter from the Storm; material from Strange Tales (1987) #13–14	Oversized hardcover	March 2020	978-1-302-92367-9
Power Pack Classic Omnibus volume 2	Power Pack (1984) #37–62; Excalibur (1988) #29; Power Pack Holiday Special (1992) #1; Power Pack (2000) #1-4; Fantastic Four (1998) #574; FF (2011) #15; Power Pack (2017) #63; Power Pack: Grow Up (2019) #1; material from Marvel Super Heroes (1990) #6; Marvel Fanfare (1982) #55	Oversized hardcover	June 2021	978-1-302-93036-3
Secret Wars II Omnibus	Power Pack (1984) #18; Secret Wars II #1–9; Uncanny X-Men #198, #202–203; The New Mutants #30, #36–37; Captain America #308; Iron Man #197; Fantastic Four #282, #285, #288, #316–319; Web of Spider-Man #6; Amazing Spider-Man #268, #273–274; Daredevil #223; Incredible Hulk #312; Avengers #260–261 and #265–266; Dazzler #40; Alpha Flight #28; Thing #30; Doctor Strange #74; Cloak and Dagger #4; Thor #363; Power Man and Iron Fist #121; Peter Parker, the Spectacular Spider-Man #111; Defenders #152; Quasar #8	Oversized hardcover	May 2009	978-0-7851-3111-3
Essential X-Men volume 6	Power Pack (1984) #27; X-Men #199–213, Annual #9; The New Mutants #46, Special Edition #1; X-Factor #9–11; Thor #373–374	TPB	September 2005	0-7851-1727-X
Essential X-Factor volume 1	Power Pack (1984) #27; Avengers #262; Fantastic Four #286; X-Factor #1–16, Annual #1; Thor #373–374	TPB	November 2005	0-7851-1886-1
X-Men: Mutant Massacre	Power Pack (1984) #27; Uncanny X-Men #210–214; The New Mutants #46; X-Factor #9–11; Thor #373–374; Daredevil #238	TPB	January 2010	0-7851-3805-6
X-Men: Fall of the Mutants Omnibus	Power Pack (1984) #35; Uncanny X-Men #220–227; The New Mutants (1983) #55–61; X-Factor (1986) #19–26; Captain America (1968) #339; Daredevil(1964) #252; Fantastic Four (1961) #312; Incredible Hulk (1968) #340	Oversized hardcover	October 2011	978-0-7851-5822-6
X-Men: Inferno Crossovers Omnibus	Power Pack (1984) #40, 42–44; Avengers #298–300; Fantastic Four #322–324; Amazing Spider-Man #311–313; Spectacular Spider-Man #146–148; Web of Spider-Man #47–48; Daredevil #262–263, 265; Excalibur #6–7; Cloak & Dagger #4	Oversized hardcover	September 2010	978-0-7851-4671-1
Acts of Vengeance Crossovers Omnibus	Power Pack (1984) #53; Uncanny X-Men #256–258; Fantastic Four #334–336; Wolverine #19–20; Dr. Strange, Sorcerer Supreme #11–13; Incredible Hulk #363; Punisher #28–29; Punisher War Journal #12–13; Marc Spector: Moon Knight #8–10; Daredevil #275–276; Alpha Flight #79–80; The New Mutants #84–86; X-Factor #49–50; Damage Control #1–4; and Web of Spider-Man #64–65	Oversized hardcover	August 2011	978-0-7851-4488-5
Power Pack: Pack Attack!	Power Pack (2005) #1–4	Digest TPB	2005	0-7851-1736-9
X-Men/Power Pack	X-Men/Power Pack #1–4	Digest TPB	2006	0-7851-1955-8
Avengers/Power Pack: Assemble!	Avengers/Power Pack: Assemble! #1–4	Digest TPB	2006	0-7851-2155-2
Spider-Man/Power Pack: Big-City Superheroes	Spider-Man/Power Pack #1–4	Digest TPB	2007	0-7851-2357-1
Hulk/Power Pack: Pack Smash	Hulk/Power Pack #1–4	Digest TPB	2007	0-7851-2490-X
Fantastic Four and Power Pack: Favorite Son	Fantastic Four and Power Pack #1–4	Digest TPB	2008	978-0-7851-2491-7
Iron Man/Power Pack: Armored and Dangerous	Iron Man/Power Pack #1–4	Digest TPB	2008	978-0-7851-2830-4
The Loners: The Secret Lives of Super Heroes	The Loners #1–6	Digest TPB	2008	978-0-7851-2215-9
Power Pack: Day One	Power Pack: Day One #1–4	Digest TPB	2008	978-0-7851-3007-9
Wolverine/Power Pack: The Wild Pack	Wolverine/Power Pack #1–4	Digest TPB	2009	978-0-7851-2831-1
Skrulls vs. Power Pack	Skrulls vs. Power Pack #1–4	Digest TPB	2009	978-0-7851-3285-1
Thor and the Warriors Four	Thor and the Warriors Four #1–4	Digest TPB	2010	978-0-7851-4120-4
Fear Itself: Avengers Academy	Avengers Academy #14–20, 14.1	Digest TPB	2012	0-7851-5200-8
Avengers Academy Volume 3: Second Semester	Avengers Academy #21–28	Digest TPB	2012	0-7851-5202-4
Avengers vs. X-Men: Avengers Academy	Avengers Academy #29–33	Digest TPB	2013	978-0-785-16581-1
Avengers Academy Volume 4: Final Exams	Avengers Academy #34–39	Digest TPB	2013	978-0-785-16031-1
Power Pack: Powers That Be	Power Pack (2020) #1–5	TPB	June 2021	978-1-302-92436-2
Aromancing of Gwendolyn Poole	Love Unlimited #43–48	Digital TPB	March – May 2023	—N/a

== In other media ==
- Julie Power, alongside the rest of Power Pack, appear in the 1991 Power Pack TV pilot, played by Margot Finley.
- Julie Power makes a cameo appearance in The Super Hero Squad Show episode "Support Your Local Sky-Father!".
- Lightspeed appears as a playable character in Lego Marvel's Avengers.
