= C. B. Cebulski =

American comic book writer

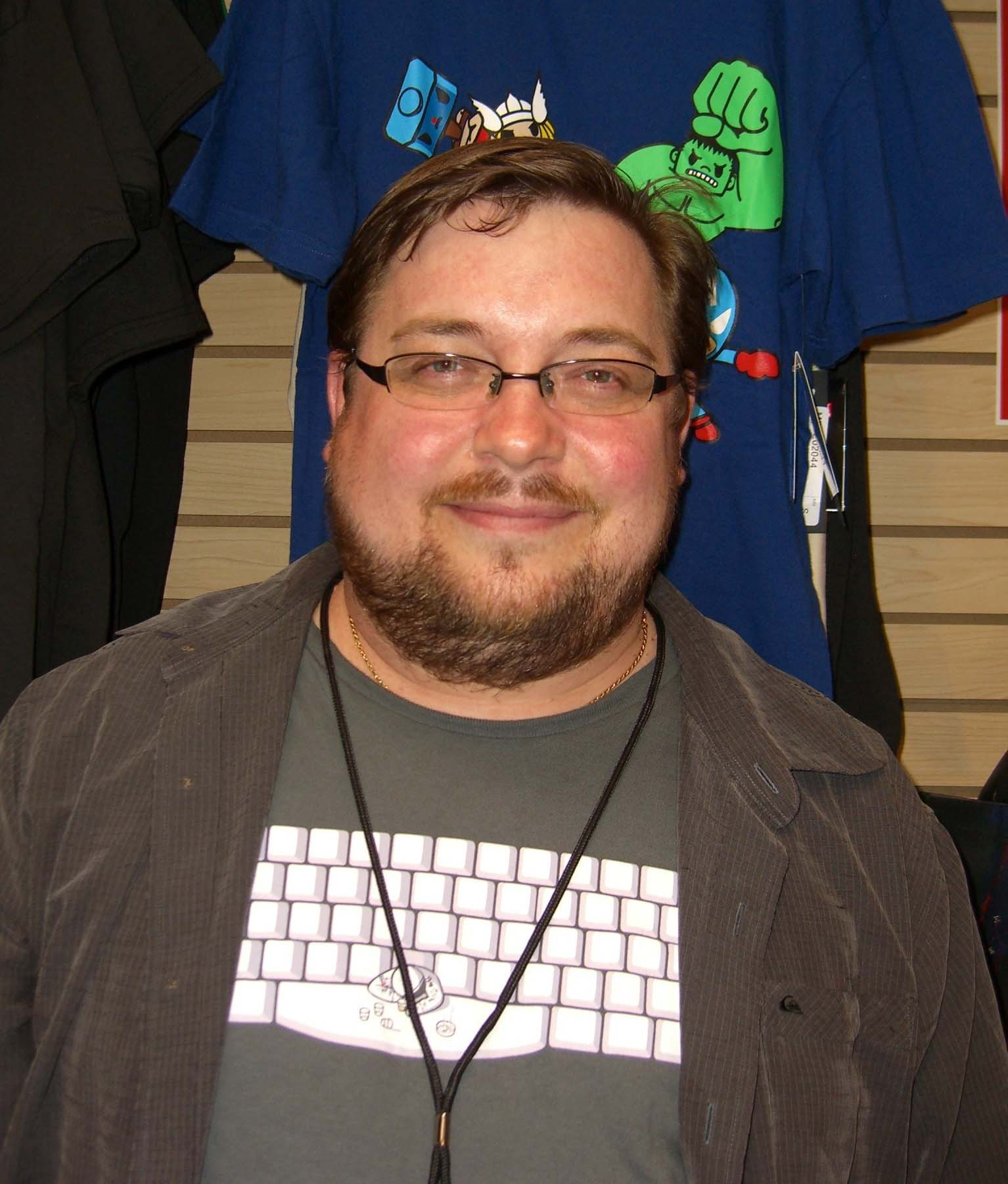
- Cebulski at a "Meet the Publishers" Q&A at Midtown Comics Downtown in Manhattan, April 14, 2011
- Born: Chester Bror Cebulski
- Areas: Writer, Editor
- Pseudonym: Akira Yoshida
- Notable works: Marvel Fairy Tales

Chester Bror Cebulski (/səˈbʌlski/) is an American writer and editor for Marvel Comics, known for his work on titles such as Marvel Fairy Tales. He was the editor-in-chief of Marvel Comics, a position he held from November 2017 to July 2026, the third longest tenure for Marvel EIC. On July 16, 2026, Marvel announced Cebulski would be stepping down as EIC, marking the third-longest tenure at that position in the company's history, in order to return to Tokyo to serve as Marvel's Asia Originals Editor, overseeing the expansion the publisher's manga and original graphic fiction line, and that Stephen Wacker would replace him as Editor in Chief.

== Early life ==
Chester Bror Cebulski is of Polish descent. Since he was 20 years old, C. B. Cebulski has lived off and on in Japan, where members of his family reside.

== Career ==
=== 1990s–2000s ===
Cebulski's early career included working as a translator and a freelance writer.

Cebulski started his comics career in 1997 editing manga for Central Park Media in New York City, bringing titles such as Record of Lodoss War, Slayers, Plastic Little, Geobreeders, Nadesico, and Kia Asamiya's Dark Angel to U.S. audiences. Cebulski remained with Central Park Media until 2001, after which he worked briefly as freelance editor on books such as Jay Faerber's Noble Causes. He did translation work on the anime Boogiepop Phantom and Assemble Insert, both distributed by Right Stuf in 2001.

In the early 2000s, Cebulski did his first work at Marvel Comics, assisting Associate Editor Brian Smith as a consultant on the Marvel Mangaverse, a line of books that reimagined classic Marvel heroes like Spider-Man and the X-Men in the style of manga (Japanese comics). In January 2002, he was hired full time as an Associate Editor under Ralph Macchio, in part because of his fluency in Japanese and his ability to recruit top artists from Japan to work for Marvel. As he rose through the ranks, he oversaw the launch of titles such as Runaways, Wolverine: Snikt, and NYX.

In 2003, Cebulski created the pseudonym Akira Yoshida, under which he began soliciting work from other companies. His work on the Dark Horse Comics books Conan and Hellboy impressed another Marvel editor who, unaware of Yoshida's real identity, asked Cebulski to pitch as well. Cebulski continued to use the pseudonym for a number of Japanese-themed comic books he wrote for Marvel in 2004 and 2005, including Thor: Son of Asgard, Elektra: The Hand, and several X-Men titles. Cebulski did this to circumvent a company policy prohibiting Marvel's editorial staff from writing or drawing comic books without special permission, or in the case of being granted such permission, being paid for doing so. Before Joe Quesada became editor-in-chief in 2000, editors used to write comics for other editors' departments, though this was seen as a corrupt practice, since it gave such editors an advantage over other writers. Cebulski created an elaborate backstory for Yoshida, stating in interviews that he was a Japanese man who grew up reading manga, and had discovered American comics when he lived in the United States as a result of his father's career as a traveling businessman. When questioned about whether or not he was actually Yoshida, Cebulski separately claimed to have met Yoshida and cited unspecified office visits and convention appearances. When Cebulski took a position at Marvel that allowed him to openly write as well as edit, Yoshida abruptly disappeared, leading to persistent rumors that Yoshida had been a pseudonym used by a Marvel staffer. When Bleeding Cool's Rich Johnston asked Cebulski in early 2006 if he was Yoshida, Cebulski said he was not. Marvel also denied the rumors, with editor Mike Marts stating that he had lunch with Yoshida when he visited the U.S. (Despite Bleeding Cool's reporting saying he had actually met with a Japanese translator). Former Marvel staffer Gregg Schigiel stated in a podcast that several people at Marvel knew about the deception, though he did not give the author's real name, and his superiors took no action on the matter.

Cebulski was the head writer on the 2006 video game Marvel Ultimate Alliance, which features a character named after him. In a sub-quest, the player needs to recommend one of two hackers to help Weasel hack into S.H.I.E.L.D. files and determine whether the Black Widow is a double agent. One of them is named after Cebulski, and is revealed to be the correct choice, since the other, Beroge, is a squealer.

Cebulski quit Marvel in 2006 to pursue freelance editing and writing work, including publishing several of his own creator-owned books through Image Comics, like Drain and Wonderlost. He returned to Marvel within a year as an editor and talent scout, establishing the Talent Management department, in which he oversaw a team of staffers to recruit and manage creators that included Jonathan Hickman, Skottie Young, Adi Granov, Sara Pichelli, Phil Noto, and Steve McNiven. In 2007 Cebulski signed an exclusive deal with Marvel.

As writer, Cebulski contributed three installments of Marvel Fairy Tales: X-Men Fairy Tales, Spider-Man Fairy Tales, and Avengers Fairy Tales.

Cebulski worked on the Runaways spin-off Loners, What if the Runaways Became the Young Avengers?, and the Nico Minoru portion of the series Mystic Arcana.

His other projects include the 2009 miniseries X-Infernus, the sequel to the 1989 storyline "Inferno", which featured the return of the character Magik, and the miniseries War of Kings: Darkhawk, a character he had previously written in The Loners.

=== 2010s ===
In 2013, Cebulski was named on IGN's list of "The Best Tweeters in Comics" for his advice on breaking into the industry.

In 2016, Marvel sent Cebulski to work and live in Shanghai as their Vice President of International Business Development & Brand Management, with which he was tasked with developing the company's brand in Asia. Cebulski brokered several deals during this tenure, including partnership with the Japan-based publisher Kodansha, the Korea publisher Daum, and China's NetEase. He also spearheaded Marvel's publication of localized stories that debuted in several Asian markets. That year during the August 26 to 28 Asia Pop Comic Convention Manila, Cebulski hosted the inaugural Hall M, a showcase of Marvel content in the fields of gaming, television, and movies.

On November 17, 2017, Cebulski was promoted to Editor-in-chief, succeeding Axel Alonso. After the announcement of his promotion, Image Comics Branding Manager David Brothers challenged comics journalists on Twitter as to why Cebulski "chose to use the pen name Akira Yoshida in the early 2000s to write a bunch of Japanese-y books for them," prompting much discussion on social media. Rich Johnston resumed his investigation into the matter, having failed to definitively substantiate the rumors in 2006. On November 28, Bleeding Cool broke the story that Marvel determined that Yoshida was a pseudonym of Cebulski's in 2006 after Johnston reported on Gregg Schigiel's podcast. Cebulski confessed to Marvel executives that in 2003, he had been planning to leave Marvel, and devised the pseudonym to establish himself as a writer for other companies like Dreamwave and Dark Horse, only for another Marvel editor to hire him on the basis of that work. Cebulski publicly admitted to having used the pseudonym Akira Yoshida, leading to accusations of cultural appropriation and yellowfacing because of the stereotypical tropes Cebulski employed in his Yoshida stories, such as ninja, samurai, and yakuza. Comics critic and scholar Kelly Kanayama stated that in those stories, Cebulski "presented a vision of Japanese culture that was just different enough to seem exotic, but that aligned with Western biases about what Japanese culture—and Japanese people—were really like."

Cebulski addressed his use of the pseudonym, stating:

I stopped writing under the pseudonym Akira Yoshida after about a year. It wasn't transparent, but it taught me a lot about writing, communication and pressure. I was young and naïve and had a lot to learn back then. But this is all old news that has been dealt with, and now as Marvel's new Editor-in-chief, I'm turning a new page and am excited to start sharing all my Marvel experiences with up and coming talent around the globe.

=== 2020s ===
On July 16, 2026, Marvel Comics announced that after nine years as editor in chief, Cebulski would be stepping down from that position, in order to serve as Marvel's Asia Originals Editor, overseeing the expansion the publisher's manga and original graphic fiction line. The change in position would see him return to Tokyo, where he had worked 25 years prior as part of Marvel's mangaverse line. Stephen Wacker, who had spent over 15 years as a Marvel executive, and several more as an executive overseeing Marvel television, animation, comics, and franchises, as well as at DC Comics, would return to Marvel to replace Cebulski as editor in chief. The move marked Cebulski's tenure as EIC as the third-longest in the publisher's history. This came amid the move of Marvel Comics from New York City to Burbank, California, as part of the company's restructuring under its parent company, Disney, a relocation that had been announced to staffers earlier in the afternoon, on the same day that Cebulski's new assignment was announced.

== Personal life ==
Cebulski lived in Shanghai for 18 months as part of his duties as Marvel's Vice President of International Business Development & Brand Management. He returned to New York City when he was promoted to Editor-in-chief in November 2017.

== Bibliography ==
- Dark Angel (with Kia Asamiya, CPM Manga, 1999)
- Marvel Mangaverse: X-Men (with Ajit Jothikaumar and Jeff Matsuda, one-shot, Marvel Comics, 2002)
- "Once Bitten" (with Makoto Nakatsuka, in Star Wars Tales #12, Dark Horse Comics, 2002, collected in Star Wars Tales Volume 3)
- Thor: Son of Asgard (12-issue series, as Akira Yoshida, with Greg Tocchini, Marvel Comics 2004)
- Elektra: The Hand (5-issue miniseries, as Akira Yoshida, with Chris Gossett, Marvel Comics 2004)
- X-Men/Fantastic Four (5 issue miniseries, as Akira Yoshida, with Pat Lee, Marvel Comics 2004–2005)
- X-Men: Age Of Apocalypse (6 issue miniseries, as Akira Yoshida, with Chris Bachalo, Marvel Comics 2005)
- Wolverine: Soultaker (5 issue miniseries, as Akira Yoshida, with Shin Nagasawa, Marvel Comics 2005)
- X-Men: Kitty Pryde - Shadow & Flame (5 issue miniseries, as Akira Yoshida, with Paul Smith, Marvel Comics 2005)
- Marvel Adventures Fantastic Four (issues #1 and #2, as Akira Yoshida, with Carlo Pagualyan, Marvel Comics 2005)
- Conan and the Demons of Khitai (4 issue miniseries, as Akira Yoshida, with Paul Lee, Dark Horse Comics 2005)
- "Dying Inside" (with David Aja, in X-Men Unlimited #14, Marvel Comics, 2006)
- I ♥ Marvel: #3 "Marvel Ai" (with various artists, Marvel Comics, 2006)
- New Mangaverse (with Tommy Ohtsuka, 5-issue limited series, Marvel Comics, 2006)
- Drain (with Sana Takeda, 6-issue limited series, Image Comics, 2006–2007)
- Marvel Fairy Tales (Marvel Comics):
  - X-Men Fairy Tales (with Sana Takeda, 4-issue mini-series, 2006)
  - Spider-Man Fairy Tales (2007)
  - Avengers Fairy Tales (2008)
- Wonderlost (with various artists, Image Comics, 2007–2008)
- Ultimates Saga (with co-author Mindy Owens and art by Travis Charest, one-shot, Marvel Comics, 2007)
- Loners (with Karl Moline, 6-issue limited series, Marvel Comics, 2007)
- Mystic Arcana Book IV: Fire (with Phil Noto, Marvel Comics, 2007)
- Legion of Monsters: "Morbius, the Living Vampire" (with co-author Brendan Cahill and art by David Finch and Michael Gaydos, Marvel Comics, 2007)
- X-Infernus (with Giuseppe Camuncoli, 5-issue mini-series, Marvel Comics, December 2008)
- War of Kings: Darkhawk (with Harvey Tolibao, 2-issue mini-series, Marvel Comics, 2009)

== Notes ==
Preceded by Axel Alonso	Marvel Comics Editor-in-Chief; 2017–present	Succeeded by Stephen Wacker
