= Torpedo (Marvel Comics) =

- The Torpedo (Brock Jones) debuts on the cover of Marvel Premiere #39 (Dec. 1977). Art by Al Milgrom.

Publication information
- Publisher: Marvel Comics
- First appearance: Daredevil #126 (Oct. 1975)
- Created by: Marv Wolfman (writer); John Romita, Sr. (artist)

In-story information
- Alter ego: Brock Jones
- Team affiliations: "Defenders for a Day"
- Partnerships: Rom

Torpedo is the name of five fictional characters appearing in American comic books published by Marvel Comics.

== Creation ==
Co-creator Marv Wolfman recalled the character's creation stating:

King of the Rocket Men was a movie serial back in the 1940s. The lead character, Commando Cody, went on to more movies/TV. I really liked Cody and yes, he inspired Torpedo, but only in the fact that Torpedo wore the rocket pack as did Cody. Other than that, we went off in different directions.

== Publication history ==
A separate character called the Torpedo was not related to subsequent versions and debuted in a one-shot story in Daredevil #59 (Dec 1969).

The second version debuted wearing the Torpedo suit that was to become a feature for successive characters, but also only appeared in one story in Daredevil #126 (Oct. 1975). The third version, Brock Jones, appeared in Daredevil #126, #127 (Nov. 1975) and #134 (June 1976) and then starred in a storyline in Marvel Premiere #39-40 (Dec. 1977 – Feb. 1978). After a guest appearance in Defenders #62–64 (Aug. – Oct. 1978) plot threads from the Marvel Premiere story were resolved in Rom #21–22 (Aug. – Sept. 1981). After appearing sporadically in the title, the character was killed in Rom #50 (Jan. 1984).

The battlesuit reappeared in New Warriors #28 (Oct. 1992), now shared between two characters under the alias of Turbo.

== Fictional character biography ==
The first version of the Torpedo is a hitman sent by a crime boss to assassinate a witness, but is defeated by the hero Daredevil.

The second version is Michael Stivak, a young scientist brought to the United States by his uncle, U.S. Senator Eugene Stivak. Asked to design a battlesuit for national defense, Michael Stivak develops a costume equipped with turbo-jets that can propel the wearer through the air and magnify physical blows. Learning that his uncle is the leader of the criminal organization the Corporation, Michael Stivak designs an inferior battlesuit for his uncle and secretly develops another suit. Using the alias "Torpedo", Michael Stivak attempts to destroy the plans for the suit and flaunts the suit's power by attacking two policemen. Following Stivak's path of destruction, Daredevil attacks. During their battle the building collapses on them.

Brock Jones witnesses the battle between Daredevil and Torpedo and frees the dying Michael Stivak. He explains the history of the battlesuit, and entrusts the completion of his mission to Jones. Once in costume, Jones is mistaken for Stivak and becomes a wanted criminal for both Stivak's crimes and killing Stivak. Jones acquires the final set of plans, but is attacked by Daredevil before he can escape. When their battle lays waste to a suburban family home, Jones surrenders his mission, gives the plans over to Daredevil, and retires from superheroing. However, shortly after, a chance sighting of the Chameleon tempts Jones into going back on his vow to never wear the suit again.

Senator Stivak sends another squad of Rocketeers to attack the new Torpedo, but after several skirmishes Jones defeats them (with Stivak dying of a heart attack). Torpedo briefly aids superhero team the Defenders and reappears in the town of Clairton as an ally of the Spaceknight Rom. It is revealed that the alien Dire Wraiths instigated the creation of the battlesuit with the intent to use it against Rom. The Torpedo allies with Rom and together they battle a squad of Rocketeers. The Torpedo acts as the guardian of the town of Clairton in Rom's absence, and after thinking the Wraith threat ended, retires. Jones is then murdered by a group of newly arrived Wraiths who use sorcery.

The battlesuit is bequeathed to Jones' first cousin Phillip Jeffries and is found in storage by his son Michael Brent Jeffries. Michael and friend Michiko "Mickey" Musashi shared the suit and adopted the codename Turbo. Michael was murdered by the Dire Wraith queen Volx, who was posing as Brock Jones' son Danny (Michael's second cousin).
