= Loner =

Person who does not seek out, or avoids relationships

A loner is a person described as not seeking out, actively avoiding, or failing to maintain interpersonal relationships.

There are many potential causes for this solitude. Intentional causes include introversion, mysticism, spirituality, religion, or personal considerations. Unintentional causes involve high sensitivity or shyness. Multiple reported types of loners exist, and individuals meeting the criteria for being called loners often practice social interactions with other individuals while displaying a variable degree of introversion leading them to seek out periodic solitude.

== Terminology ==
According to some sociologists and associations, the modern term loner can be used in the context of the belief that human beings are social creatures and that those who do not participate are deviants.

However, the term is sometimes depicted culturally as positive, and indicative of a degree of independence and responsibility. Someone who is a recluse or romantically solitary can be referred to by the terms singleton and nonwedder. According to Elizabeth Follmer, the term is often used to describe a perceived hatred for other people, leading perceived loners to being viewed as outcast or misfit.

== Overview and possible characteristics ==
There are different types of loners, including individuals who prefer solitude and limited social interaction. The first type includes individuals that are forced into isolation because they are, or feel as though they are, rejected by society, and may experience loneliness. A second type of individuals described as loners includes those who regularly practice social interaction, while also spending extended periods of time in solitude, without experiencing feelings of loneliness. A third type of loner is described as not experiencing loneliness during long periods of solitude, or in a different way to how forcibly isolated individuals practicing social interaction would. However, individuals often experience all three types interchangeably.

The term is often associated with introversion, due to perceived loners having innate personality traits and life experiences. In psychiatry, individuals being loners is sometimes associated to different mental disorders. Some individuals described as loners have alexithymia, characterized by the inability to identify and describe emotions. Other disorders and illnesses associated with the term include social anxiety disorder, borderline personality disorder, avoidant personality disorder, depression, autism, and schizoid personality disorder.

The characteristics associated with the term are often attributed to non-human animals such as leopards, whose behaviour is usually defined by voluntary solitude.

When expressing the desire to solitude, individuals described as loners may not reject human contact entirely. A person who avoids social interaction with colleagues beyond what is required for work or school responsibilities, mainly for practical reasons such as avoiding the complication of non-personal life, is often found to be highly charismatic during social gatherings with people outside of work or school—or vice versa.

== See also ==
- Avoidant personality disorder
- Byronic hero
- Hedgehog's dilemma
- Hikikomori
- Social phobia
- Social rejection
- Wallflower (person)
