= Marvel Zombies (comic book) =

Comic book metaseries by Marvel Comics

- A Marvel Zombies cover parodying Secret Wars (1984–85) by Arthur Suydam
- Created by: Mark Millar; Greg Land; Robert Kirkman

Publication information
- Publisher: Marvel Comics
- Schedule: Monthly
Title(s)
Ultimate Fantastic Four (2005) #21–23
Marvel Zombies (2005) #1–5
Ultimate Fantastic Four (2006) #30–32
Marvel Zombies vs. The Army of Darkness (2007) #1–5
Black Panther Vol. 4 (2007) #28–30
Marvel Zombies 2 (2007) #1–5
Marvel Zombies: Dead Days (2008) #1
Marvel Zombies 3 (2008) #1–4
Marvel Zombies 4 (2009) #1–4
Marvel Zombies Return (2009) #1–5
Marvel Apes: Prime Eight (2009) #1
Marvel Zombies: Evil Evolution (2009) #1
Marvel Zombies 5 (2010) #1–5
Marvel Zombies Supreme (2011) #1–5
Marvel Zombies Destroy! (2012) #1–5
Marvel Zombies Halloween (2012) #1
Marvel Zombies: Battleworld (2015) #1–4
Age of Ultron vs. Marvel Zombies (2015) #1–4
Zombies Assemble (2017) #0–3
Zombies Assemble 2 (2017) #1–4
Marvel Zombie (2018) #1
Marvel Zombies: Resurrection (2019) #1
Marvel Zombies: Resurrection (2020) #1–4
- Formats: Original material for the series has been published as a set of story arcs in Ultimate Fantastic Four, limited series, and one-shot comics.
- Genre: Superhero
- Publication date: September 2005 – present

Reprints
- Collected editions
- Marvel Zombies: ISBN 0-7851-2277-X
- Marvel Zombies vs. The Army of Darkness: ISBN 0-7851-2743-7
- Marvel Zombies: Dead Days: ISBN 0-7851-3563-4
- Marvel Zombies 2: ISBN 0-7851-2546-9
- Marvel Zombies 3: ISBN 0-7851-3635-5

Marvel Zombies is an American comic book metaseries published by Marvel Comics. The series features zombie versions of Marvel Universe characters who have been portrayed as both protagonists and antagonists through the different limited series within the metaseries.

== Publication history ==
The series of titles begins with two Ultimate Fantastic Four story arcs, "Crossover" (2005) and "Frightful" (2006), by Mark Millar and Greg Land. The story arcs were followed by a Marvel Zombies limited series by Robert Kirkman and Sean Phillips, who also created the prequel Marvel Zombies: Dead Days and sequel Marvel Zombies 2.

A crossover with Army of Darkness, Marvel Zombies vs. The Army of Darkness, was written by John Layman with art by Fabiano Neves, Fernando Blanco and Sean Phillips.

With Marvel Zombies 3, Kirkman and Phillips were replaced by Fred Van Lente and Kev Walker. The team continued on to Marvel Zombies 4, a four-issue mini-series starting in April 2009. Van Lente then stayed on to write the first and last issues of Marvel Zombies Return, a series of five one-shots looking at different aspects of the outbreak. With Marvel Zombies 5 he teamed up with Kano, with the story picking up from the end of Marvel Zombies 4.

A new series was launched in 2011, Marvel Zombies Supreme takes the zombie infection to Earth-712, the universe of Squadron Supreme. It has a new creative team of Frank Marraffino and penciller Fernando Blanco. This was followed by Marvel Zombies Destroy! set in a dimension where Nazi zombies won the war. It was initially written by Frank Marraffino, with art by Mirco Pierfederici, but Marraffino's health issue meant he had to hand over the writing reins to Peter David with issue #3.

== The infection ==
The ultimate origin of the infection is unknown. Although a paradoxical loop is responsible for its existence in the universes seen in Marvel Zombies and Marvel Zombies Return, several universes are shown to have their own isolated outbreaks that have not reached the catastrophic levels seen in other series. As seen in Marvel Zombies 5, some of these universes have unique variations different from the established virus. Any connection between the common version seen in the first four series and Marvel Zombies Return and the isolated, alternate versions seen in Marvel Zombies 5 is unknown. In Marvel Zombies Supreme, the zombified Squadron Supreme is created when scientists graft the original team's DNA to human corpses and zaps them with space radiation. These zombies appear to be infected with a disease identical to the one seen in Marvel Zombies, its three sequels, and Marvel Zombies Return, though what this suggests about the origin of the virus seen in those series (if anything) is unknown.

Regardless, the most frequent version is the virus seen in the first several Marvel Zombies series. The contagion passes via a bite from an infected being. The infected appears to be dead, or at least decaying, but retains their intelligence, personality, and special abilities, sans healing factors; of note, the virus was initially contained in North America, but was able to be spread over the world when Quicksilver was infected. With his abilities retained, he raced around the world and spread the infection to foreign heroes such as Captain Britain, Red Guardian, Silver Samurai and Ka-Zar. The disease causes a powerful hunger in the host, a hunger which can only be sated by ingesting the flesh of the living; the flesh of other infected tastes foul to them and causes them to be ill. The hunger affects the infected's self-control; the more hungry they are, the less rational and intelligent they become. Once sated, the zombies' personalities re-emerge, and the more humane and moral individuals (such as Spider-Man) often feel great guilt at this point, though others (such as Hank Pym or Reed Richards) seem to embrace the infection, and seek to spread the infection to other universes.

The disease seems to be almost 100% infectious, with even Wolverine, the Hulk and Deadpool, individuals normally highly resistant or immune to most diseases, being affected. However, as noted by Spider-Man, those with any kind of accelerated healing appear to be able to fend off the zombification longer after being bit than others, though it does eventually overcome them. The disease is also shown to convert the high gods of Asgard and Olympus, as well as bearers of the Phoenix Force, as members of several of Earth's ancient pantheons, such as Thor, Hercules and Amora, along with Jean Grey, are shown among the packs of zombies in various series. Perhaps the only immunity goes to voodoo-crafted zombies, such as Simon Garth, and non-organic mechanical beings, such as Jocasta, Ultron and Machine Man who apparently cannot be affected by the zombie virus, certain mystical changes in physiology (such as in the case of Jack Russell, from his human to werewolf form), while unable to purge the infection, are able to keep it and its effects at bay for some time, and Uatu and the Watchers, due to their having exchanged corporeal bodies for forms of pure energy long ago, are incapable of being consumed by the infected, and are immune to the virus. Wundarr the Aquarian, empowered by the energies of the Cosmic Cube, is able to, through intense hibernative meditation within an energy cocoon, eventually purge the infection from his system, and the Man-Thing, allegedly due to his intimate connection with Gaea, evidently cannot be permanently harmed by the zombie virus. The only other individual who has avoided infection is Iron Fist who appears to be able to purge the infection via his healing abilities, despite being bitten twice.

While the skills of Doctor Druid and apparently Doctor Strange (the Sorcerer Supreme of Earth's dimension and who was sought by the former for help after contracting the virus), and even the dark magic of the Necronomicon itself cannot seem to directly cure the virus, at least some forms of highly potent extradimensional magic, such as that employed by the Faltine Dormammu through the mystic Jennifer Kale, is even able to at least temporarily take control of the plague and its consciousness. Kale's Atlantean magery, combined with the voodoo spells of Black Talon, is able to draw and contain the virus-mind within a single suitable host, such as Simon Garth. The zombified Hank Pym, when the Marvel Zombies are confronted by Death and Thanos (secretly Skrulls in disguise), expresses the view that the power of the Cosmic Cube could undo everything that has thus far occurred. In Marvel Zombies 5, Morbius of the core Marvel Universe finally manages to produce a cure by combining samples of different versions from several realities, having earlier produced a vaccine that could possibly infect its users as well, as shown in the case of the Werewolf. Reed Richards of the Ultimate Marvel Universe was able to easily overpower and cripple the zombified Fantastic Four of Earth-2149 using magic he learned from Doctor Doom's Atlantean spellbooks. Furthermore, Mephisto has proven capable of easily destroying the zombies using his demonic hellfire.

The disease is incredibly difficult to stop once spreading, due to the high survival rate of all zombies. Zombies seem to only need their brain stem to survive and can continue living without any use of their organs, limbs, and body functions. The infection even allows severed heads without lungs or vocal cords to continue speech just to further its infection capability. This was witnessed by Wasp and Hawkeye in the original Marvel Zombies, they were both simply severed heads that somehow still could function, and another example would be Colonel America, who survived for over 40 years as a brain on the ground until being put inside the body of Black Panther's dead son.

The contagion has an addiction element to it; if a victim can be isolated from a food supply, within a couple of weeks the cravings disappear and the subject is able to perform a functional role within society, albeit with necrotized flesh and near-immortality. Any additional ingestion of flesh will restore the hunger, though it can again be overcome. Another interesting note about the addiction is that, even while lacking a digestive system or even most of their lower body, the infected still have hunger pangs and wish to continue feeding.

== Main series ==
=== Ultimate Fantastic Four ===
In the story arc "Crossover" (issues #21–23), Reed Richards is contacted by an older version of himself from an alternate dimension. After crossing over, Reed discovers he's been tricked and that it is an alternate Earth where all the superheroes turned into zombies looking to use the Ultimate Marvel universe as a food source. The zombified Fantastic Four of this reality, after failing to capture him, cross over to Earth-1610 through a dimensional portal but are captured. With help from Magneto, Reed escapes the zombie universe and prevents more zombies from entering the Ultimate universe.

In "Frightful" (issues #30–32), the zombified Fantastic Four of Earth-2149 attempt to break free from their confinement. Johnny Storm is infected with a demon from the N-Zone, and Reed Richards performs a mind-swap with Doctor Doom. After the zombies break free, Reed, in Doom's body, becomes the demon's new host and defeats the zombies. Doom undoes the mind-swap and goes through the portal, destroying it and trapping himself in the zombie universe.

=== Marvel Zombies ===
After zombie superheroes eat the human race to extinction, Galactus prepares to eat the Earth. Colonel America, Giant Man, Wolverine, the Hulk, Iron Man, Luke Cage and Spider-Man defeat and devour the Silver Surfer, and then attack Galactus. Infused with the Power Cosmic, Giant Man, Wolverine, the Hulk, Iron Man, Luke Cage, and Spider-Man travel the universe as the "Zombie Galacti" to search for more sources of food.

=== Marvel Zombies vs. The Army of Darkness ===
In this crossover, Ash Williams from Evil Dead arrives accidentally in the world of Marvel Zombies. Continuing Ash's own storyline from Army of Darkness (The Death of Ash (vol. 1) #12–13), this series also serves as a prequel and an origin story of the Marvel Zombies.

=== Marvel Zombies: Dead Days ===
In this continuation from Marvel Zombies vs. The Army of Darkness, the zombie infection spreads throughout the world, while uninfected superheroes inside the S.H.I.E.L.D. helicarrier try to concoct a plan to save the human race; unfortunately, many of them were overwhelmed and infected, while the survivors flee back to the S.H.I.E.L.D. Helicarrier.

=== Marvel Zombies 2 ===
After devouring all life in the universe over the course of 40 years, the Zombie Heroes return to Earth to find a way to access other dimensions for food. On Earth, they face off against New Wakanda, a colony of humans who survived the zombie onslaught. Near the end of the book, the zombie Hulk kills many zombies and he, too, is killed. The last remaining zombies are teleported to a new world at the end.

=== Marvel Zombies 3 ===
After zombies invade the Marvel Universe, Machine Man and Jocasta go to the Marvel Zombies universe to retrieve a blood sample from an uninfected human. Unbeknownst to them, a zombie Morbius plans to use the blood to infect the Marvel Universe.

=== Marvel Zombies 4 ===
The Midnight Sons, under the command of A.R.M.O.R., hunt zombies who have escaped to different universes. Meanwhile, Dormammu commands the Hood to capture the virus for his own ends of zombie life.

=== Marvel Zombies Return ===
The storyline follows from Marvel Zombies 2, where Zombie Spider-Man, Giant-Man and Wolverine (the Earth-2149 version of Wolverine is killed in the 3rd issue) were teleported to a different universe similar to Earth-616 called Earth-91126/Earth-Z, and deals with the ramifications of their arrival on a new Earth and the characters' resurgent hunger, which once again drives them to obtain cross-universal teleporters.

Each issue stars its title characters, though not necessarily the zombified versions of Earth-2149, as seen in the case of Iron Man and Hulk, whose respective issues feature uninfected versions battling zombies. The series sees different takes on key events in the classic 616 drastically altered by the zombies including the formation of the Sinister Six, Demon in a Bottle, the Kitty Pryde and Wolverine miniseries and World War Hulk before a final issue which sees two groups of Zombie Avengers from the two realities battling, one group led by Spider-Man which wants to stop their hunger and destroy the zombie plague, and a second led by the Sentry who wants to unleash the plague on all realities.

The series culminates in the Watcher of the new universe (who had seemingly been eaten by Giant Man in the first issue, but a Watcher cannot be killed or infected in that manner) sending the infected Sentry of his reality (who had been infected by a zombified Hulk in their battle during World War Hulk) back in time to the moment when the Sentry first appeared and spread the infection on Earth-2149, essentially 'containing' the zombie virus in those two universes in an elaborate time loop, Uatu recognizing that since the virus's "hunger" will never be sated, let it then devour itself.

=== Marvel Zombies: Evil Evolution ===
This one-shot is a crossover between the Zombies and the Marvel Apes. It resolves some of the remaining questions over the origin of the zombie plague and is set between Dead Days and "Crossover". The story starts in the Zombieverse shortly after Dead Days. Zombie Giant-Man and Wasp discover the Ape-verse (as seen in the previous Apes specials) and take a trip there to devour its populace. In the story, it is discovered that the Prime Eight scared them back to their dimension.

The Ape-vengers are now leading a pre-emptive strike into the Zombieverse to get the zombies before they get the Apes. There are heavy casualties on both sides. Zombie Reed Richards is beheaded, but still mobile. He teams up with the Gibbon, Gorilla Girl, Ape-X, Speedball, Spider-Monkey, and the rest of the characters to alter history so that the Ape and Zombie universes never meet.

The team is successful. History is changed so that the Apes never found Speedball back in the Speedball Special, so the zombies never discover either universe. However, Gorilla Girl sacrifices herself to change history and ceases to exist.

It is also implied that a dimensional portal Reed Richards had earlier been testing had something to do with bringing the zombie Sentry to his Earth, though this is not made clear how this fits in with the rest of the Marvel Zombies series.

=== Marvel Zombies 5 ===
In this direct sequel to Marvel Zombies 4, forecasters for A.R.M.O.R. discover that several alternate realities afflicted with a variation of zombification will temporarily merge during a cross-temporal "planetstorm". Morbius charges fellow A.R.M.O.R. agents, Machine Man and Howard the Duck with retrieving different samples of zombies from each reality so that he can find a cure for his infected friend, Jack Russell. Different classes of zombies are identified, informally named after the directors of movies in which their type appeared (e.g. "Romeros" and "Boyles"). Amazing Spider-Man #622 acts as a prequel to this series.

=== Marvel Zombies Supreme ===
Responding to a mysterious emergency call, Jill Harper and her super-crisis special-ops unit descend deep into the bowels of a top-secret underground research facility. They discover that the demented experiments of an unhinged geneticist have placed them at ground zero of a brand-new virulent zombie strain—one that has infected powerful superheroes. The Squadron Supreme, once heroic defenders of justice and utopian ideals, have been reduced to corpulent cannibalistic murderers with a voracious appetite for human flesh. Harper and her team fight against overwhelming odds to stop this ravenous zombie menace where it began—before it spreads out to devour Earth.

=== Marvel Zombies Destroy! ===
A.R.M.O.R. is called upon to rescue an alternate reality where the Nazis won WWII with zombies, and seek to use magic rituals to teleport themselves to every universe. Howard the Duck brings in Nazi-fighter extraordinaire Dum Dum Dugan and a squadron of fighters known as Ducky's Dozen.

=== Secret Wars ===
Marvel, as part of its Secret Wars multiverse crossover where pieces of the main Marvel universe, Ultimate universe, and several other alternate universes are melded into a Battleworld, offers two Marvel Zombies stories. The first one, simply called Marvel Zombies, falling under the Battleworld banner, is about Elsa Bloodstone who is stationed on the Shield and tasked with keeping the zombie hordes from rampaging through Battleworld. When she is not enraptured in battle, she meditates on her deceased father Ulysses Bloodstone and his tough lessons that made her what she is today. But it seems that one more final lesson is yet to be learned.

The second story is titled Marvel Zombies vs. Age of Ultron. A story full of black humor, through the eyes of someone with limited technological knowledge, who must find the limits of his skills and humanity to defeat an army in which Ultron's robots who want to destroy life to create a perfect world, and have therefore teamed up with the Marvel Zombies who are the antithesis of life and perfection.

=== Marvel Zombie ===
Marvel Zombies received a franchise reboot in October 2018 with the freshly titled Marvel Zombie. The story takes place years after an incurable zombie virus ravaged the world, when a small colony of survivors is protected by the Marvel Universe's few remaining heroes, including Spider-Man, Daredevil and the Falcon.

=== Marvel Zombies: Resurrection ===
Originally titled Marvel Zombies: Respawn, the series received another reboot in October 2019, when Galactus' corpse appears at the edge of Earth's solar system, the Avengers, X-Men, and Fantastic Four investigate. However, they discover that Galactus' body is now the vessel of an interstellar terror, which transforms others into cannibalistic monsters.

After the initial attack, the series jumps to a point a few years later, where Peter Parker, Karla Sofen, Forge, Franklin and Valeria Richards are travelling with a reprogrammed Sentinel, as possibly the last superhuman survivors. As they desperately fight for survival, they meet other living survivors, including Blade, and eventually retreat to Atlantis following a few additional clues. Once there, they find Logan, still alive but crippled after his healing factor has been pushed to the limit. The group is confronted by Magik, who takes them to Limbo and reveals that the current 'plague' was caused when the Brood managed to infest Galactus, upgrading them to a new level of power.

=== Marvel Zombies: Black, White & Blood ===
An anthology horror series featuring separate stories of a zombie apocalypse across the Marvel Universe, presented in a black and white format with splashes of red. Each issue contains multiple stories from different creators, focusing on a variety of heroes and villains as they face or become part of the undead plague.

=== Marvel Zombies: Dawn of Decay ===
The Guardians of the Galaxy face an army of undead Avengers in this new Marvel Zombies chapter called Dawn of Decay, in which a new zombie virus is unleashed, and Groot is Patient Zero.

=== Marvel Zombies: Red Band ===
The Fantastic Four return from space transformed, craving human flesh and spawning a new grisly parallel universe.

=== Marvel Zombies: War Zone ===
When a zombie outbreak his Manhattan and the city is overrun, a barrier is hastily erected to protect the world. Inside the barrier, a war zone breaks out as survivors fight for their lives against the ever-growing horde.

== Tie-in comics ==
=== Army of Darkness ===
Set before the events of The Army of Darkness crossover, the two-part story The Death of Ash ends with Ash being killed, and finding himself in the Marvel Zombies Universe, where he is confronted by the undead superheroes.

The From the Ashes story arc begins with Ash having returned to his home dimension through unknown means, and proclaiming "Step one, no zombie superheroes. Off to a good start". The subsequent storyline The Long Road Home has a few of the heroes, such as Colonel America and Thor, appear silhouetted in a one-panel flashback as the narration states that Ash had gone on to "kick the ass of all types of undead marvels across the realities".

=== Black Panther (vol. 4) ===
In Black Panther (vol. 4) #27 – 30, the Fantastic Four (Black Panther, Storm, the Human Torch and the Thing) are teleported by King Solomon's Frogs to the "Marvel Zombies universe" where they encounter the Marvel Zombies in their "Zombie Galacti" form on a Skrull planet. This is the first crossover of the "Zombie"- and Marvel's main universe. During their time in this world, T'Challa talks with his other self to learn what had happened on Earth, and the FF also encounter the alternate Lyja- the Torch's Skrull wife in his universe- who is part of a new attempt by the Skrulls to give members of their species the power of the Fantastic Four, this time divided across four Skrulls rather than recreating the Super-Skrull. Once the FF have returned to their world, T'Challa states that he has used the experience from talking with his other self to draw up plans to prevent such an infection ever happening on their world.

=== Deadpool: Merc with a Mouth ===
A sequel to Marvel Zombies 4, Deadpool teams up with his zombified head after discovering it in the Savage Land. Dodging Hydra operatives, dinosaurs, cavemen and zombie cavemen, he attempts to return the head to the Marvel Zombies universe.

=== Deadpool Corps ===
A sequel to Deadpool: Merc with a Mouth, Deadpool goes into different universes to find other Deadpools: Headpool, the zombie head of Deadpool; Kidpool, a kid version of Deadpool; Lady Deadpool, a female version of Deadpool; and Dogpool, who is Deadpool as a dog, to form the Deadpool Corps.

After Deadpool Corps: Prelude, the Deadpool Corps travel around the universe, fighting off the Champion, "Borg"-like entities, and looking for the "broken blade", all while trying to defeat the evil awareness and saving the universe.

=== Marvel Apes ===
Though not directly related to Marvel Zombies, Marvel Apes was first suggested as a successor to Marvel Zombies by a fan during a convention Q&A session with Joe Quesada. All of the following one-shots are resolved with the aforementioned Marvel Zombies: Evil Evolution.

==== Marvel Apes: Speedball Special ====
At the end of the first issue, a glimpse of an unidentified zombie (likely Giant Man and Wasp) is seen, commenting that he would like to have a bite out of the protagonists, who warp to a different universe.

==== Marvel Apes: The Amazing Spider Monkey ====
The issue ends with Red Ghost and the ape Speedball in the Ape Universe, running away from the recently appearing zombie versions of Giant Man, the Wasp, Iron Man, Wolverine, and others.

==== Marvel Apes: Grunt Line ====
The issue ends with Ape X, Gibbon, Jane Potter, Gorilla Girl, and the Red Ghost's apes in the Marvel Zombies universe, as zombie versions of Wolverine and Colonel America draw closer.

==== Marvel Apes: Prime Eight ====
Iron Mandrill and other heroes receive a vision of the Marvel Zombies. When the seven most powerful Apes gather and reluctantly have to work together with Doctor Doom and a futuristic Nick Furry 2099, they realize that the zombies have already arrived and one of the apes will be infected. The heroes are able to protect their universe from the infection, but unbeknownst to them, Iron Mandrill has been infected and is secretly consuming his dates and hiding behind his armor.

== Other comics ==
=== Spider-Ham ===
Spider-Ham accidentally travels through the multiverse ending up in the Marvel Zombies universe where he becomes a zombie, often referred to as "Undead Ham". Undead Ham's last words are "Roink! Get out of my way, robot! I'm Hungry". He is with zombies Colonel America, Wolverine, and Hulk.

=== Exiles ===
A zombiefied Wolverine, similar to the Marvel "Zombie Universe" version, appears in an Exiles comic book series alongside other Wolverines from different dimensions, but this zombie version of Wolverine is ultimately killed.

=== Marvel Zombies Christmas Carol ===
Not directly tied into the Marvel Zombies series, this miniseries is an adaption of the classic story and focuses on Ebenezer Scrooge encountering the Ghosts of Christmas Past, Christmas Present and Christmas Yet to Come in a world overrun by the undead, due to the character's selfishness and greed.

=== Marvel Zombies Halloween ===
A one-shot telling the story of living in a zombie-devastated world, through the eyes of a survivor (eventually revealed to be a grown-up Katherine Pryde) and her son (also the child of Colossus), on Halloween. It is not clear whether this is meant to be Earth-2149 or another possible reality. Zombified versions of the New Warriors appear, along with Squirrel Girl.

=== Marvel Zombies Handbook ===
Marvel Zombies: The Book of Angels, Demons, & Various Monstrosities depicts the various Marvel Zombies characters, as part of the Official Handbook of the Marvel Universe series.

=== Zombies Assemble Vol. 1 ===
The original manga is adapted into English, with a story less based on the Marvel Zombies continuity, and more on the cinematic universe. The Avengers have assembled to save the Earth from destruction. But they have never had to face a threat as gruesome and undead as this one. Now, Earth's Mightiest Heroes must fight to contain an outbreak of horrifying zombies, and stop them from spreading across the Earth. But not all of the Avengers will escape uninfected.

=== Zombies Assemble Vol. 2 ===
The Avengers face a threat even bigger and more menacing than they could have imagined as the stakes are raised in the race to cure the zombie outbreak. Caught in the midst of a city overrun by zombies, they come face-to-face with Jasper Scott, a mysterious scientist who claims to have a cure for the virus. But who is he really, and does he actually possess the antivirus? Marvel's English-language adaptation of the original manga series concludes in Vol. 2.

== Covers ==
Most Marvel Zombies issues and trade paperbacks feature covers by Arthur Suydam recreating classic Marvel Comics covers with the characters replaced by zombie versions. The covers of Marvel Zombies 3 by Greg Land feature recreations of posters of classic zombie films featuring zombified Marvel Comics characters. Starting with Marvel Zombies 4 the covers were usually original designs, with some variants continuing the zombified spoof trend.

== Collected editions ==
There are several trade paperbacks collecting the various stories:

#	Title	Publisher	Year	ISBN	Reprints
	Marvel Zombies	Marvel Comics	Aug. 2006	ISBN 0-7851-2277-X	Marvel Zombies #1–5
	Marvel Zombies vs. The Army of Darkness	Marvel Comics	Sept. 2007	ISBN 0-7851-2743-7	Marvel Zombies vs. The Army of Darkness #1–5
	Marvel Zombies: Dead Days	Marvel Comics	April 2008	ISBN 0-7851-3232-5	Ultimate Fantastic Four #21–23, 30–32; Marvel Zombies: Dead Days; Black Panther (vol. 4) #28–30
	Marvel Zombies 2	Marvel Comics	June 2008	ISBN 0-7851-2545-0	Marvel Zombies 2 #1–5
	Marvel Zombies 3	Marvel Comics	May 2009	ISBN 0-7851-3635-5	Marvel Zombies 3 #1–4
	Marvel Zombies 4	Marvel Comics	Oct. 2009	ISBN 0-7851-3917-6	Marvel Zombies 4 #1–4
	Marvel Zombies Return	Marvel Comics	Jan. 2010	ISBN 0-7851-4277-0	Marvel Zombies Return #1–5
	Marvel Zombies 5	Marvel Comics	Nov. 2010	ISBN 0-7851-4743-8	Marvel Zombies 5 #1–5
	Marvel Zombies Christmas Carol	Marvel Comics	Sept. 2011	ISBN 0-7851-5772-7	Marvel Zombies Christmas Carol #1–5
	Marvel Zombies Supreme	Marvel Comics	Sep 2011	ISBN 0-7851-5167-2	Marvel Zombies Supreme #1–5
	Marvel Zombies Destroy	Marvel Comics	Oct. 2012	ISBN 0-7851-6384-0	Marvel Zombies Destroy #1–5
	Marvel Zombies: Battleworld	Marvel Comics	Dec. 2015	ISBN 0785198784	Marvel Zombies #1–4, Marvel Zombies #1
	Age of Ultron vs. Marvel Zombies	Marvel Comics	Nov. 2015	ISBN 0785198636	Age of Ultron vs. Marvel Zombies #1–4, Age of Ultron #1
	Zombies Assemble Vol. 1	Marvel Comics	Nov. 2017	ISBN 1302904531	Zombies Assemble #0–3
	Zombies Assemble Vol. 2	Marvel Comics	Feb. 2018	ISBN 0785194614	Zombies Assemble 2 #1–4
	Marvel Zomnibus	Marvel Comics	Oct. 2012	ISBN 0-7851-4026-3	Ultimate Fantastic Four #21–23, 30–32; Marvel Zombies #1–5; Marvel Zombies: Dead Days; Black Panther vol. 4 #28–30; Marvel Apes: Prime Eight; Marvel Zombies 2 #1–5; Marvel Zombies 3 #1–4; Marvel Zombies 4 #1–4; Marvel Zombies Return #1–5; Marvel Zombies: Evil Evolution; Marvel Zombies 5 #1–5; Marvel Zombies Supreme #1–5
	Marvel Zomnibus Returns	Marvel Comics	Oct. 2023	ISBN 1302953788	Deadpool: Merc With A Mouth #1–13; Zombies Christmas Carol #1–5; Marvel Zombies Destroy #1-5; Marvel Zombies Halloween #1; Marvel Zombies (2015) #1-4; Age of Ultron vs Marvel Zombies #1–4; Marvel Zombie #1; Marvel Zombies Resurrection (2019) #1; Marvel Zombies Resurrection (2020) #1–4
	Marvel Zombies: The Complete Collection Volume 1	Marvel Comics	Nov. 2013	ISBN 0-7851-8538-0	Ultimate Fantastic Four #21–23, 30–32; Marvel Zombies #1–5; Marvel Zombies: Dead Days; Black Panther (vol. 4) #28–30
	Marvel Zombies: The Complete Collection Volume 2	Marvel Comics	May 2014	ISBN 0-7851-8829-0	Marvel Zombies 2 #1–5; Marvel Zombies 3 #1–4; Marvel Zombies 4 #1–4; Marvel Zombies Return #1–5
	Marvel Zombies: The Complete Collection Volume 3	Marvel Comics	Nov. 2014	ISBN 0-7851-8899-1	Marvel Apes: Prime Eight #1; Marvel Zombies: Evil Evolution; Marvel Zombies 5 #1–5; Marvel Zombies Supreme #1–5; Marvel Zombies Destroy #1–5; Marvel Zombies Halloween #1
	Marvel Zombies: The Covers	Marvel Comics	Nov. 2007	ISBN 0-7851-2908-1	Various Marvel Zombies series

== Merchandising ==
There is a range of supporting merchandise based on the characters. Diamond Select have produced Minimates based on the series, action figures and a number of mini busts.

== In other media ==
=== Television ===
- Marvel Zombies served as inspiration for the Disney+ animated series What If...? episode "What If... Zombies?!" set in the Marvel Cinematic Universe (MCU). In this version of events, the outbreak is caused by Hank Pym and Hope van Dyne during their attempt to retrieve Janet van Dyne from the Quantum Realm, only to learn too late that she had contracted a quantum virus that corrupted her brain.
- An adult animated MCU series, Marvel Zombies, was released on September 24, 2025, serving as a continuation of the episode. The show centered around other characters including Kamala Khan, Shang-Chi and Blade Knight amongst others, trying to stop the Queen of the Dead. A second season is in production.

=== Film ===
Headpool appears in Deadpool & Wolverine, voiced by Nathan Fillion.

=== Video games ===
- The Marvel Zombies universe makes a cameo appearance in Frank West's ending in Ultimate Marvel vs Capcom 3.
- Zombie Venom appears in Marvel: Future Fight.
- Headpool appears as part of Deadpool's moveset in Marvel Tokon: Fighting Souls.

=== Novels ===
The Hunger by Marsheila Rockwell (Aconyte Books, 2023).

=== Miscellaneous ===
The Zombicide game series received a Marvel Zombies-themed spin-off game.

== Reception ==
The Marvel Zombies were ranked #11 on a listing of Marvel Comics' monster characters in 2015.

== See also ==
- Blackest Night - a similar crossover storyline published by DC Comics
- DCeased – a similar storyline published by DC Comics.
