= Marvel Zombies 2 =

Comic book limited series

- Cover of Marvel Zombies 2 #1. (Dec. 2007); Art by Arthur Suydam.

Publication information
- Publisher: Marvel Comics
- Schedule: Monthly
- Format: Limited series
- Genre: Superhero
- Publication date: October 2007 – February 2008
- No. of issues: 5
- Main character: Zombie versions of Marvel Comics characters

Creative team
- Written by: Robert Kirkman
- Artist: Sean Phillips
- Letterer: Rus Wooton
- Colorist: June Chung
- Editor(s): Ralph Macchio; Joe Quesada; Bill Rosemann; Lauren Sankovitch

Collected editions
- Hardcover: ISBN 0-7851-2545-0

Marvel Zombies 2 is a five-issue limited series published from October 2007 - February 2008 by comics publisher Marvel Comics. The series was written by Robert Kirkman with art by Sean Phillips and Arthur Suydam. It is part of the Marvel Zombies series.

== Publication history ==
The Marvel Zombie concept first appeared in Ultimate Fantastic Four #21-23 (2005), in which almost all of the superheroes on Earth became flesh-eating zombies after being infected by an alien virus. The Marvel Zombie phenomenon then continued with the Marvel Zombies metaseries that was published from December 2005 to April 2006. In the series, the zombie superheroes eat the human race to near-extinction then begin to travel the universe to search for even more sources of food.

Even before the release of the Marvel Zombies metaseries, illustrator Sean Phillips stated that he wouldn't mind illustrating a sequel but only if Robert Kirkman returned to write it. Concurrently, Kirkman warned the readers to not automatically expect a sequel yet he didn't rule out the possibility completely.

In 2007, a single comic came out, called Marvel Zombies: Dead Days. Dead Days is a prequel to the Marvel Zombies series, in which the zombie infection spreads throughout the world and the superheroes try and create a plan to save the human race. Lastly, there's Marvel Zombies vs. The Army of Darkness, a crossover five-issue series published in 2007. The series is set before and during the prequel Dead Days, where Ash Williams is transported into the Marvel Zombies universe and must fight the zombies while trying to escape back to his own universe.

== Plot ==
Forty years after leaving Earth, the cosmic-powered zombies have systematically devoured all other life in their universe, as well as infected the Titan Thanos, the mutant Phoenix, Shi'ar warrior Gladiator and former Herald of Galactus, Firelord, with the zombie plague. They then decide to return to Earth and rebuild the interdimensional portal that Magneto destroyed forty years ago, in hope of finding more food. On their way to Earth, they encounter Ego the Living Planet. Surprised that there is a living planet, the zombies do not hesitate to devour him.

On Earth, an elderly Black Panther rules the surviving humans in New Wakanda, but he is in a power struggle with the new generation of Acolytes, a team of mutant supervillains who praised Magneto, and their leader, Malcolm Cortez, the disillusioned son of Fabian Cortez, an old friend of T'Challa. An Acolyte assassin attacks the Panther in his sleep and nearly disembowels him. However, the Panther is saved from death by the Wasp (who remains a zombie but who is now cured of her hunger), when she deliberately infects him in order to 'save' him. After devouring the assassin, the two struggle with how to manage their hunger, while the cosmic zombies continue their approach to Earth. During their interstellar travel back to Earth, Spider-Man and Luke Cage gradually lose their hunger and begin to act rationally once again. Giant Man wishes to start a "breeding program" to create more human food. A battle ensues because of Spider-Man and Cage's new insight, knowing what they have done is wrong now that their hunger has subsided enough to allow them to think rationally.

The humans erect an impenetrable barrier, with most of the cosmic-powered zombies outside trying to find a way in. Inside the barrier, Spider-Man and Luke Cage help kill Gladiator. Because of that, the humans gain trust in the two and repair their injuries sustained in the fight against Gladiator (Spider-Man's ripped torso and Cage's cybernetic lower half of body). Spider-Man then reveals that the other zombies seek the dimensional teleporter, which is said to be stored in the base. Knowing that the zombies will not depart without the device, the heroes prepare for the next battle. In doing so, Reynolds, one of the remaining Acolytes, reveals that he had uncovered Colonel America's partially functioning brain and had spliced it into the body of T'Challa's deceased and zombified son, T'Channa, creating a delusional, non-hungry Colonel America. An enraged Black Panther attacks Reynolds for this, but soon relents upon seeing his edge into violence, though he refuses to forgive Reynolds for this transgression.

Meanwhile, at the Baxter Building, Giant-Man and his team scour the building in search of the device, battling the Fantastic Four's defense systems, but to no avail, they cannot find it. Iron Man, having seen Forge in his original Iron Man armor earlier when he ransacked the ruins of Stark International, deduces that he must also have activated the defense systems inside the building and taken the portal. With this in mind, Giant-Man leads his team back to New Wakanda to retrieve the device.

Giant-Man's team arrives outside New Wakanda, where Black Panther, Luke Cage, Wasp, Hawkeye, and Spider-Man are waiting. Panther offers a barter; handing over the device in exchange for sparing the people of New Wakanda. Hank and Tony agree, and the force field is lowered. However, they are soon double-crossed when Black Panther's team engages Giant-Man's in combat. Giant-Man's zombies gain the upper hand, with Iron Man gaining access to the human's base, preparing to feast on the remaining humans, only to be met by Colonel America, Forge in the original Iron Man armor, and the remaining Acolytes. Giant-Man and the remnants of his team break into the facility and attack the safe room holding the remaining civilians. As Giant-Man is about to feast on Black Panther's wife Lisa, he is surprised to realize that he has lost his hunger. Giant-Man then convinces the zombies that their hunger is in fact gone, and while he is successful, they are interrupted by an enraged and starving Hulk. The Hulk kills several of the zombies (Phoenix, Firelord, Hawkeye, and Iron Man) as they attempt to stop him from eating the remaining humans. Reynolds, having fallen in love with Wasp and believing her to be dead, offers himself to be devoured by the Hulk to stop the Hulk's rampage, with the belief that he has nothing left to live for. The Hulk consumes Reynolds and then reverts to Bruce Banner, who requests to be killed by the survivors to prevent the Hulk from returning.

Three weeks later, the zombies aid the remaining humans in the restoration and repair of New Wakanda. They then hold a memorial for Iron Man, Firelord, Phoenix, and Hawkeye for their sacrifices during the Hulk's rampage.

Later, the zombies are called to a meeting with Malcolm to discuss using the inter-dimensional portal to transport the remaining humans to another universe. However, Malcolm reveals that he intentionally sabotaged the device to not work, claiming that he never wants to know what civilization is like and that he would enjoy ruling over New Wakanda alone. He then announces that he would be getting rid of the zombies to prevent them from getting in the way of his plans, and also reveals that he murdered T'Challa's son, T'Channa, and that one day, he would murder T'Challa's grandson. Malcolm then activates the machine and the zombies are hurled into another dimension.

Forge arrives and confronts Malcolm over his actions, only to be knocked unconscious by Malcolm, who proclaims that they are someone else's problem now.

== Collected editions ==
The series has been collected into a single volume:

- Marvel Zombies 2 (collects #1-5, 128 pages, hardcover, June 2008, ISBN 0-7851-2545-0)
- Marvel Zombies 2 (collects #1-5, 120 pages, softcover, May 2009, ISBN 0-7851-2546-9 / ISBN 978-0-7851-2546-4)

== Merchandise ==
There is a very large amount of merchandise based on the zombie superhero characters of Marvel Zombies. Diamond Select have produced Marvel Zombie Minimates, action figures, statues, and a number of mini busts. Along with figurines, there is also "Marvel Zombie" clothing, including sweatshirts and T-shirts that have pictures of the zombie superheroes themselves or covers from the multiple comic books. Stores such as the popular retailer Hot Topic carry a lot of the zombie comic book merchandise.

There is also a collection of the Marvel Zombie comic book covers, featuring the art of Arthur Suydam, Greg Land and Kyle Hotz.

== In other media ==
=== Film ===
- In Spider-Man: Far From Home, set in the Marvel Cinematic Universe, Mysterio creates an illusion of a zombified Iron Man, which is inspired by the cover of the first issue of Marvel Zombies 2.

== See also ==
- Marvel Zombies
- Marvel Zombies 3
- Marvel Zombies vs. The Army of Darkness
- Marvel Zombies: Dead Days
