= Marvel Zombies =

Five-issue comic book miniseries

- Cover of Marvel Zombies parodying Secret Wars (2006), hardcover collected edition, art by Arthur Suydam

Publication information
- Publisher: Marvel Comics
- Schedule: Monthly
- Format: Limited series
- Genre: Horror, superhero
- Publication date: December 2005 – April 2007
- No. of issues: 5
- Main character: Zombie versions of Marvel Comics characters

Creative team
- Written by: Robert Kirkman
- Artist: Sean Phillips
- Letterer: Randy Gentile
- Colorist: June Chung
- Editor(s): John Barber; Ralph Macchio

Collected editions
- Marvel Zombies: ISBN 0-7851-2277-X

Marvel Zombies is a five-issue limited series published from December 2005 to April 2006 by Marvel Comics. The series was written by Robert Kirkman with art by Sean Phillips and covers by Arthur Suydam. It was the first series in the Marvel Zombies series of related stories. The story is set in an alternate universe where the world's superhero population has been infected with a virus that turned them into zombies. The series was spun out of events of the crossover story-arc of Ultimate Fantastic Four, where the zombie Reed Richards tricked his Ultimate counterpart into opening a portal to the zombie universe only for the latter to contain the former from ever coming to his universe.

Following an adaptation in the episode "What If... Zombies?!" of the Disney+ animated television series What If...?, an animated television series of the same name was released on September 24, 2025.

== Publication history ==
While writing Ultimate Fantastic Four, Mark Millar decided to introduce an alternate Earth populated by zombies in the "Crossover" story-arc, featured in issues #21–23. Marvel Comics liked Millar's idea so, as he wrote the issues, Marvel sought out pitches for a spin-off miniseries featuring that world entitled Marvel Zombies. To revisit the zombie world, Marvel hired Robert Kirkman to write and Sean Phillips to illustrate it. Kirkman was Marvel's first choice to write Marvel Zombies, an offer Kirkman immediately accepted because of his love for zombies and Marvel comic books, feeling that he couldn't pass up such an opportunity. He also expressed excitement upon learning which artist would be in charge of illustrating the series; Kirkman was a longtime fan of Phillips' work, like in DC Comics' Sleeper. Kirkman also didn't fear being typecasted as "the superhero guy" or "the zombie guy" due to his work on the series, feeling that there was enough variety in his superhero work to keep things interesting.

Kirkman wrote the series in a way that would work for readers who had not read the Ultimate Fantastic Four issues featuring the zombified superheroes, despite noting that readers of that series would have more insight with spin-off's characters, especially Magneto, due to his larger role in the first issue. Comparing the protagonists with the "slow moving, mindless Romero style zombies" he used in The Walking Dead, Kirkman reasoned that the Marvel characters, either heroes or villains, retained their usual personalities and powers, only driven to devour flesh by their uncontrollable hunger, with the miniseries depicting how they deal with their hunger and how they interact with each other. Like other types of zombies, it was decided to establish how the zombified Marvel characters could specifically be killed in the story's context. Kirkman also added some black comedy to the story, and included some gore like most zombie stories do, expressing some shock at how Marvel allowed him and Phillips to incorporate those elements. An early idea Kirkman had for the series involved Luke Cage surviving the zombie plague as the sole human protagonist, given the character's unbreakable skin and that Millar's scripts didn't explicitly identify some characters separately. However, after seeing the finished art for Millar's issues, Kirkman discovered that Greg Land had already drawn Luke Cage as a zombie, and the idea was dropped, which Marvel originally objected to.

To illustrate the miniseries, Phillips used an art style similar to that he used on Ed Brubaker's Sleeper. As the story was a sequel to the Ultimate Fantastic Four story featuring the zombie infested world, Phillips kept the look of the characters consistent to how Land drew them, with Phillips drawing them with the same costumes Land gave them but with Phillips' own style. He particularly liked to illustrate the zombie versions of Thor and Captain America. Drawing the superheroes as zombies was the most difficult part of the process for him, as he had grown accustomed at drawing characters in street clothes but was forced to draw their muscles in spandex costumes again. Overall, Phillips enjoyed working with Kirkman in the series, feeling that the most enjoyable part of the process was "playing around" with the huge character cast Kirkman assembled.

== Plot ==
Within the Marvel Multiverse is an alternate Earth designated Earth-2149, which contains alternate zombie versions of Marvel superheroes. The story begins as an unknown superhero from another dimension, brought by the "Hunger", crash lands before infecting the Avengers, X-Men, Fantastic Four and almost all other superheroes. The infection spreads by contact with the blood of the victim, usually through a bite by an infected individual. The zombie superheroes largely retain their intellect, personality and superpowers, and are able to function regardless of the damage to their brain, although they are consistently driven by the "Hunger" for human flesh.

The series begins where the Crossover story-arc ended, with Magneto destroying the cross-dimensional transporter after the Ultimate Fantastic Four and survivors escaped back to the Ultimate universe. After a battle with the zombies, Magneto learns that the Acolytes and Forge are still alive on Asteroid M. Before he can reach them, he is attacked, killed and eaten by the zombies while managing to behead the zombified Hawkeye. The Silver Surfer arrives on Earth and informs the zombies that his master Galactus is en route to devour the planet. The zombies attack the Silver Surfer, who is overpowered and devoured by several of the former superheroes: Captain America, Iron Man, Giant-Man, Spider-Man, Luke Cage, the Hulk, and Wolverine. After acquiring a portion of the Power Cosmic, they slaughter most of the remaining zombies, intent on satiating their hunger despite the latter's unpalatability.

The Acolytes return to Earth to find Magneto, discovering a still-living Black Panther. The Panther has escaped from the lab of the zombie Giant-Man who kept him alive as a food source, leaving the Panther without an arm and a foot. Zombie Wasp gets into an argument with her husband when she discovers he was hoarding the Black Panther. He promptly decapitates Zombie Wasp by biting off her head, which remains sentient. After observing the Wasp's head begging for the flesh, Black Panther reasons that hunger is more psychological than physical.

Meanwhile, the zombies have decided that the flesh of other zombies isn't satisfying. Galactus arrives on Earth and is attacked by the zombies but repels them easily. Giant-Man, Iron Man and Bruce Banner create a device that amplifies the powers they gained from the Silver Surfer, and together with Captain America, Luke Cage, Spider-Man and Wolverine they are able to injure Galactus. The cosmic-powered zombies fight off zombified versions of several supervillains, although Captain America is killed by the Red Skull. They proceed to devour Galactus. Giant-Man, the Hulk, Iron Man, Luke Cage, Spider-Man and Wolverine are thus infused with Galactus' power cosmic', and the group becomes collective Galacti.

Five years later, Black Panther, the Acolytes and the Wasp (restored with a cybernetic body) return to Earth to find the planet depopulated. Unknown to them, the Zombie Galacti have taken their hunger to the stars. In final scenes, an intelligent alien race on a distant planet is fearful of the coming of Galactus, as they can see the signs of his imminent arrival in the night sky. To their horror, the Zombie Galacti land on their world and immediately begin to consume the population.

== Sequels ==
An intercompany crossover between Marvel and Dynamite Entertainment, published from May to September 2007 provided information as to the source of the zombie infection in the five-part limited series titled Marvel Zombies vs. The Army of Darkness (Marvel) and Army of Darkness (Dynamite). In July of the same year, a one-shot graphic novel, Marvel Zombies: Dead Days provided more story details, and the zombies also appear in a three-part storyline in Black Panther (vol. 4) #28 – 30, although they make their appearance in the last page of #27 first, and encounter the Earth-616 Fantastic Four.

A sequel to the original series, the five-issue Marvel Zombies 2, was published from October 2007 to February 2008, and Marvel Zombies 3 a four-issue series, commenced October 2008. Marvel Zombies 4 is a four-issue limited series published over the summer of 2009, and features characters from Marvel's horror comics (Man-Thing, Morbius the Living Vampire, Werewolf by Night, and Mephisto among others). Marvel Zombies 5 is a five-issue direct sequel to Marvel Zombies 4, published in June and ending in October 2010. Marvel Zombies Return is a five-issue miniseries begun in September 2009, and is a direct sequel to Marvel Zombies 2 that wraps up the original zombie plotline. Several other sequels and spin-offs have been produced.

In 2006, the October issue of Wizard magazine featured a one-page Marvel Zombies comic by artist Sean Phillips called "Eat the Neighbors". It parodied Hostess pastry advertisements featured in the Marvel titles in the 1970s, which showcased Marvel superheroes defeating villains by offering them snacks. In this instance, Spider-Man, Captain America and Iron Man serve two children as "Hostees Meat Pies" after the children mistake them for legitimate superheroes.

Another humorous one-shot comic book was also published in 2007 featuring the alternate universe animal hero Spider-Ham and titled Ultimate Civil War: Spider-Ham. Spider-Ham accidentally crosses over into Earth-2149 and becomes, as J. Michael Straczynski puts it, "Undead Ham".

=== Secret Wars (2015) ===
The Marvel Zombies universe was featured in the 2015 Secret Wars storyline where it also had its own tie-in miniseries, Age of Ultron vs. Marvel Zombies. The Battleworld domain of the Marvel Zombies is called the Deadlands; it, Ultron's domain, Perfection, and Annihilation's realm, New Xandar, all are separated from the other Battleworld domains by a wall called SHIELD, which is mostly made from Ben Grimm. The zombies and Ultron's drones spent several years battling until they formed an 'alliance'. They start by targeting the Deadland resistance, led by surviving heroes the Vision, Wonder Man, and Jim Hammond, who gather those exiled beyond the Wall into a secure city they have established. At the time of the attack, the three heroes have managed to rescue a version of Hank Pym exiled from a Wild-West-era zone, who is able to use his counterpart's notes to devise a means of shutting down the hive mind of Ultron's drones despite his more primitive background, at the cost of sacrificing the Vision and Wonder Man to make the machine work (although Wonder Man's android lover is reconfigured so that she can die in Hammond's place).

During the core Secret Wars miniseries, Black Panther uses the zombies as an army to attack the now-all-powerful Doctor Doom in the final stand, using his new 'King of the Dead' status and the Siege Perilous to take the zombies directly to Doom's castle, although even this number is merely a distraction to keep Doom occupied while Reed Richards targets Doom's power source.

=== Dawn of Decay (2024) ===
In 2024 a new and revamped Marvel Zombies Dawn of Decay based on The Last of Us (with a fungus based infection instead this time) was released. Featuring Groot and Hulk as the two main characters taking on the apocalypse.

== Collected editions ==
There are several trade paperbacks collecting the various stories:

- Marvel Zombies (collects Marvel Zombies #1–5, hardcover, 136 pages, August 2006, ISBN 0-7851-2277-X)
- Marvel Zombies (collects Marvel Zombies #1–5, softcover, 136 pages, October 2007, ISBN 978-0-7851-2014-8)
- Marvel Zomnibus (includes Marvel Zombies #1–5, 1200 pages, October 2012, ISBN 0-7851-4026-3)

Other related collections include:

- Marvel Zombies: The Covers (by Arthur Suydam, hardcover, 104 pages, November 2007, ISBN 0-7851-2908-1)

== Merchandise ==
There is a range of supporting merchandise based on the characters. Diamond Select have produced Marvel Zombie Minimates, action figures and a number of mini-busts.

Wizkids' HeroClix has had appearances of zombie versions of Spider-Man, Captain America, Hulk, and Wolverine as Chase figures in the "Supernova" set. In the "Mutations and Monsters" set, there was an Iron Man, Giant-Man, Spider-Man, and a Galactus-Powered Wolverine. There was also a Janet Pym bystander token in the "Mutations and Monsters" set. More recently HeroClix released a Zombie Villains series of figures. These included Deadpool, Kingpin, Rhino, Green Goblin, Electro, Doctor Octopus, Venom, Sabretooth, and Juggernaut from the "Deadpool" set. Additionally, a generic Skrull, Super-Skrull, Mole Man, Morbius, Gladiator, Red Skull, Magneto, Doctor Doom, and a Zombies Team Base were released in the "Guardians of the Galaxy" set. The "Wizkids Marvel" set contains a zombie Galactus colossal figure, which does not have the same Z-Virus keyword as the rest of the Marvel Zombie characters. These newer Z-Virus figures are all of rare 'Chase' or 'Convention Exclusive' with the exception of Headpool who is also the only figure who does not fit on the Zombies Team Base.

== In other media ==
=== Television ===
- The Marvel Zombies series was adapted into the fifth episode of the Marvel Cinematic Universe (MCU) / Disney+ series Marvel's What If...?, "What If... Zombies?!". In this version of events, the zombie outbreak is caused by Janet van Dyne, who became a zombie after contracting a Quantum virus that corrupted her brain while she was trapped in the Quantum Realm, and infecting Hank Pym.
  - Following the airing of "What If... Zombies?!", a spin-off series based on and named after Marvel Zombies was produced and released in September 2025.

=== Video games ===
- Frank West's ending in Ultimate Marvel vs Capcom 3 sees him witnessing an alternate universe featuring zombified versions of Marvel superheroes similar to Marvel Zombies.
- Zombie versions of Venom, Captain America, Falcon, Doctor Strange, Wong, Captain Marvel and Scarlet Witch appear as playable alternate skins in Marvel: Future Fight.
- The October 2025 Season update for Marvel Snap is a Halloween-themed tribute to Marvel Zombies, with characters like Headpool, Zombie Scarlet Witch, Colonel America, and Zombie Power-Man bringing the zombified Marvel Universe to the popular trading card game.

== See also ==
- DCeased – a similar storyline published by DC Comics.
- Infestation – a series similar to Marvel Zombies by IDW Publishing.
