= Red Ghost (character) =

Marvel Comics fictional character

- Cover art for Fantastic Four: Foes #5 (July 2005). Art by Jim Cheung.

Publication information
- Publisher: Marvel Comics
- First appearance: Fantastic Four #13 (April 1963)
- Created by: Stan Lee (writer); Jack Kirby (artist)

In-story information
- Alter ego: Ivan Kragoff
- Species: Human mutate
- Team affiliations: Intelligencia
- Partnerships: Attuma
- Abilities: Genius IQ; Intangibility; Invisibility; Mist form; Use of high-tech devices and weapons

The Red Ghost (Ivan Kragoff) is a character appearing in American comic books published by Marvel Comics. Created by writer Stan Lee and artist Jack Kirby, the character first appeared in Fantastic Four #13 (April 1963). Kragoff is a Soviet scientist and supervillain who deliberately recreated the accident that created the Fantastic Four to give himself superpowers. He first served as an antagonist to the Fantastic Four before later confronting other superheroes, including the Avengers. He is also the leader of the Super-Apes—Mikhlo (Михло), Igor (Игорь), and Peotr (Пётр)—who were empowered alongside him.

== Development ==
=== Concept and creation ===
Ivan Kragoff is a Cold War–era villain depicted as a Soviet scientist determined to surpass the Americans and reach the Moon before them during the Space Race. Seeking to replicate the Fantastic Four's exposure to cosmic rays, Kragoff launched himself into space with three trained apes—Mikhlo, Igor, and Peotr—who also underwent mutation and became his Super-Apes. The experiment granted Kragoff the ability to become intangible, while his apes gained abilities such as super strength and shapeshifting. The character reflects the period's fascination with space exploration and scientific experimentation, though his Cold War–inspired origins became less prominent in later decades.

=== Publication history ===
Ivan Kragoff and the Super-Apes debuted in Fantastic Four #13 (April 1963), created by Stan Lee and Jack Kirby. He subsequently appeared in several Marvel titles, including Iron Man (1968), Marvel Apes: Speedball (2009), and Avengers Assemble (2024).

== Fictional character biography ==
Ivan Kragoff was born in Leningrad, in what was at the time the Soviet Union. Before becoming the Red Ghost, he was a Soviet scientist bent on beating the Americans to the Moon and claiming it for the Communist empire. He assembled a crew of three trained primates — Mikhlo the gorilla, Igor the baboon, and Peotor the orangutan — which he subjected to specialized training regimens.

Kragoff knew of the Fantastic Four's history, and deliberately designed his rocket to give his crew superpowers via cosmic rays. Kragoff gained the ability to become intangible and invisible, Mikhlo became superhumanly strong and durable, Igor gained the ability to shapeshift and could transform into nearly anything, and Peotor gained the ability to attract and repulse objects.

The Red Ghost and his Super-Apes, as he called them, battle the Fantastic Four soon after gaining powers, first meeting the Thing. Red Ghost encounters Uatu, who said he would bring the two warring groups together in a fight for supremacy over the Moon. The Red Ghost and his apes first defeat the Four and kidnap the Invisible Girl. However, the Super-Apes rebel against their master after the Invisible Girl deactivated a force field, allowing them access to the food the Red Ghost kept from them. Mikhlo then breaks down the metal door, freeing the Invisible Girl. The Red Ghost gets into Uatu's base, hoping to use his secrets, but is unable to understand the technology and is thrown out by the Watcher.

Kragoff next experiments with a cosmic-ray intensifier to attempt to increase his own superhuman powers, but instead leaves himself permanently intangible. He manages to sustain his body through his willpower alone, preventing his body from dispersing, though he remains intangible. Months later, Mister Fantastic travels into space to expose himself to cosmic radiation and revitalize his powers. Kragoff secretly stows aboard the spaceship and hides until he can restore his powers as well. Fully recovered, he battles Mister Fantastic before escaping.

The Super-Apes later show up alone, having separated themselves from the Red Ghost and operating as independent criminals. The three take over a private zoo in Salina, Kansas, turning the animals against the local population and capturing Namorita, Speedball, and Microbe when they enter the complex. The three convince the Super-Apes to stand down and make peace with the citizens along with the zoo animals.

The Red Ghost later appears as a member of the Intelligencia among other super-geniuses. While the Red Hulk is fighting the X-Men, the Red Ghost manages to capture Beast and Black Panther and sends the Super-Apes to assist the Red Hulk, only for them to attack him instead. Mikhlo is killed by the Red Hulk, which enrages the Red Ghost.

During the Civil War II storyline, the Red Ghost and his Super-Apes are working on a new science project when Steve Rogers, the original Captain America, attacks them and kills the Super-Apes. The Red Ghost tries to escape, losing his right arm and left leg in the process. He is apparently killed by Rogers, who confiscates his project for his own agenda.

Through unknown means, Miklo, Igor, and Peotor are revived and ally with Ziggy Pig's Masters of Animal Evil.

The Red Ghost takes refuge in Kingsport, Massachusetts, where the town is besieged by the ghosts of primates who died from cosmic radiation experiments and are hunting after their former master. The Avengers Emergency Response Squad end the threat by letting the primate ghosts have their revenge on Red Ghost while leaving him alive to face justice. The primates move on to the afterlife as the Avengers Emergency Response Squad see that Red Ghost is delivered to the Hague.

== Powers and abilities ==
Ivan Kragoff is a brilliant scientist and cosmonaut who acquired his powers after deliberately exposing himself and three trained apes to cosmic rays during a space mission. The exposure granted Kragoff the ability to become intangible and phase through solid matter, while the apes each developed unique superhuman abilities, forming a team under his command. Mikhlo, the gorilla, gained superhuman strength; Peotr, the orangutan, developed limited telekinetic abilities; and Igor, the baboon, acquired the power to shapeshift into any form.

== Known Super-Apes ==
- Miklho - A gorilla who gained super-strength and durability.
- Igor - A baboon who gained shapeshifting abilities.
- Peotor - An orangutan who gained the ability to attract and repel objects.
- Alpha - A gorilla with super-strength who betrayed Red Ghost.
- Beta - A gorilla with mind-control abilities who betrayed Red Ghost.
- Grigori - A baby gorilla who Red Ghost took in as a successor of Miklo and possesses the same abilities as him.
- Yaroslavi - A chimpanzee with energy-projecting abilities.

== Other versions ==
=== Amalgam Comics ===
An alternate universe version of Ivan Kragoff appears in the Amalgam Universe. This version is the secretary of state of Gorillagrad.

=== Marvel Zombies ===
An alternate universe version of Ivan Kragoff appears in Marvel Zombies: Evil Evolution.

=== Ultimate universe ===
The Ultimate Marvel version of Ivan Kragoff is introduced in Ultimate Fantastic Four as a scientist based in Siberia. Kragoff's assistant Sorba Rutskaya stabs him and reveals that she plans on using a beam of energy from the N-Zone to fuse with Susan Storm, gain her powers, and use them to destroy those that she believes are harming nature. However, Sue escapes, with the beam instead hitting Rutskaya and several vials of primate DNA. Rutskaya is transformed into a gigantic gorilla-like creature with multiple primate limbs and heads, as well as a single human head which retains her personality. In addition to possessing the same intangibility powers as the main universe's Red Ghost, Rutskaya can create apes and monkeys from her body that are subservient to her will, with each being capable of manifesting N-Zone superpowers.

== In other media ==
=== Television ===
- Ivan Kragoff / Red Ghost and the Super-Apes appear in Fantastic Four, with the former voiced by Vic Perrin.
- Ivan Kragoff / Red Ghost and the Super-Apes appear in The Avengers: Earth's Mightiest Heroes.
- Ivan Kragoff / Red Ghost and the Super-Apes appear in the Hulk and the Agents of S.M.A.S.H. episode "The Defiant Hulks", with the former voiced by JB Blanc.
- Ivan Kragoff / Red Ghost and the Super-Apes appears in Lego Marvel Avengers: Code Red, with the former voiced by Roger Craig Smith.

=== Miscellaneous ===
Ivan Kragoff / Red Ghost was originally set to appear in The Fantastic Four: First Steps (2025), portrayed by John Malkovich, but the character was ultimately cut from the film. However, Peotor makes a cameo appearance, while an animated version of Red Ghost and the Super-Apes appear in the post-credits.

=== Video games ===
Ivan Kragoff / Red Ghost and the Super-Apes appear in the Xbox 360 and PlayStation 3 versions of the Fantastic Four: Rise of the Silver Surfer film tie-in game, with the former voiced by Dwight Schultz.
