= Marvel Zombies: Dead Days =

2008 comic book one-shot

- Cover of Marvel Zombies: Dead Days #1 featuring zombie versions of Cyclops, Iceman and Wolverine, by Arthur Suydam.

Publication information
- Publisher: Marvel Comics
- Genre: Superhero
- Publication date: May 2007

Creative team
- Written by: Robert Kirkman
- Artist: Sean Phillips
- Letterer: Rus Wooton
- Colorist: June Chung
- Editors: Ralph Macchio; Joe Quesada

Collected editions
- Marvel Zombies: Dead Days (Hardcover): ISBN 0-7851-3232-5

Marvel Zombies: Dead Days is an American comic book one-shot first published in May 2007 by Marvel Comics. It was written by Robert Kirkman and drawn by Sean Phillips, with cover art by Arthur Suydam. It is part of the Marvel Zombies series and a prequel to Marvel's first Marvel Zombies limited series, which had the same creative team. The story provides additional details about the zombie plague first infecting the Marvel Zombies universe.

The story takes place during the events of the second issue of Marvel Zombies vs. The Army of Darkness.

== Plot ==
Spider-Man reaches Mary Jane Parker and Aunt May to find them safe and sound. When questioned about the current situation, Peter confesses to being bitten by the zombified Colonel America. He then succumbs to the hunger virus, attacking Mary Jane.

Meanwhile, Magneto, on board Asteroid M, expresses regret for apparently helping bring the virus to Earth and returns to the planet to help. Nova arrives at the Parker flat to find Spider-Man devouring his wife and aunt and tries to reason with him. Daredevil arrives to explain to Nova what is going on, and that the rules have changed. Daredevil is infected by Spider-Man in the process.

Colonel America has a moment of clarity and leads the rest of the infected Avengers to the Avengers Mansion to try to find a cure for the virus. At the Xavier Institute, Storm, Cyclops, Wolverine, Nightcrawler, Shadowcat, and Colossus try to fend off the undead Alpha Flight to protect the surviving students in the mansion. After disposing of Alpha Flight, Magneto recruits the X-Men to work with him in fighting the zombies.

Meanwhile, the Fantastic Four return home to find an infected She-Hulk devouring Franklin and Valeria Richards. Enraged and grief stricken, Invisible Woman kills She-Hulk before receiving a call from Nick Fury.

Nick Fury calls all the remaining superheroes and villains together in an attempt to counter the virus. Fury places Tony Stark, Bruce Banner, and Reed Richards on task to research a cure for the contagion. Fury then assigns everyone else to go out and rescue who they can. Nova protests that the infection is too far out of control to be stopped, but is silenced by Fury.

Stark decides to build a machine that will teleport them to an alternate universe similar to their own, reasoning that reconstruction would take too long with so many dead even if the virus was stopped immediately. Stark hopes to have the machine operational as soon as possible. Back on the ground, the resistance is losing the fight against the zombies, with Wolverine and Nova succumbing to the virus, and have to retreat back to the helicopter.

Mister Fantastic calls the rest of the Fantastic Four to his lab to discuss his findings. Insane, Reed now believes that the infection is evolution; as such, he infects the rest of his family. Reed then allows them to feed on and infect him, wanting to experience the change himself.

As Stark finishes the machine, the zombified Fantastic Four burst into the room and infect him. Fury grabs the machine and pulls it into a small room where the remaining heroes have gathered. Realizing that completing the machine will give the zombie population an opportunity to spread their infection to other realities, Fury commands Thor to destroy the machine. The Fantastic Four then breach the room and kill him, while transforming the remaining heroes into zombies. When asked what will happen next, Reed responds that he shall rebuild the machine and "spread the gospel".

== Collected editions ==
A trade hardcover edition of Marvel Zombies: Dead Days was released which collected the issue, along with the Ultimate Fantastic Four story arcs, Crossover and Frightful where the Marvel Zombies made their first appearance.

- Marvel Zombies Dead Days (collects Marvel Zombies: Dead Days, Ultimate Fantastic Four #21-23, #30-32, and Black Panther #28-30, 272 pages, hardcover, ISBN 0-7851-3232-5, softcover, January 2009, ISBN 0-7851-3563-4)
