= List of Ultimate Fantastic Four story arcs =

Synopses of Ultimate Fantastic Four storylines and graphic novels are featured here. The first writers of the series were Brian Michael Bendis and Mark Millar for the first 6 issues. They were followed by Warren Ellis for 12 issues, Mike Carey for 2 issues before Mark Millar came back for a separate run of 13 issues, after which Carey came back for a longer run of 26 issues. The book ended with Joe Pokaski, writer of Heroes, for the remaining 3 issues, concluding through his Requiem story.

== Brian Michael Bendis and Mark Millar ==
=== The Fantastic (#1–6) ===
- Published between: February 2004 - July 2004
- Creators: writer Brian Michael Bendis, Mark Millar, artist Adam Kubert
- Plot outline: A young Reed Richards is recruited by a government think-tank after they are affected by his experiments.
- Notes: Putting H.E.R.B.I.E. into the Ultimate Fantastic Four continuity immediately was a chief concern of author Brian Michael Bendis.

== Warren Ellis ==
=== Doom (#7–12) ===
- Published between: August 2004 - January 2005
- Creators: writer Warren Ellis, artist Stuart Immonen
- Plot outline: Reed and his friends must learn to adapt to their new situation. Victor Van Damme, also affected by the accident, decides to get revenge.
- Notes: In issue #9, Doom, Part 3, artist Stuart Immonen's depiction of the Human Torch's increasing power was influenced by the energy ball that consumes Neo-Tokyo in the Japanese manga Akira.

=== N-Zone (#13–18) ===
- Published between: January 2005 - June 2005
- Creators: writer Warren Ellis, artist Adam Kubert
- Plot outline: Issues #13-18 show the Fantastic Four's first encounter with the sadistic alien Nihil. Reed outfits a space shuttle, and the FF use it to travel to the N-Zone, a parallel universe experiencing heat death, an entropic state that signals the eventual end of that universe. Nihil follows them back to earth, and dies battling the FF and trying to take over the dimension.
- Notes: Adam Kubert's depiction of Nihil's alien army closely resembles the Jawas from Star Wars, while their plasma weapons closely resemble the gaffi sticks of the Sand People.

== Mike Carey ==
=== Think Tank (#19–20) ===
- Published between: July 2005 - August 2005
- Creators: writer Mike Carey, artist Jae Lee
- Plot outline:In issues #19-20 the Fantastic Four are attacked and kidnapped by Rhona Burchill, who failed the Baxter Building test the day before Reed arrived. Ben, Sue and Johnny are taken down, but Reed revives them. After a brief battle. Rhona escapes using a sort of holographic duplication defense. Not knowing which is the true Rhona, the team are forced to let her go. Later, Reed receives a strange contact from somebody who looks strangely like him.
- Notes:

== Mark Millar returning ==
=== Ultimate Fantastic Four Annual #1: Enter the Inhumans ===
- Published: October 2005
- Creators: writer Mark Millar, artist Jae Lee
- Plot outline: In the first Ultimate Fantastic Four Annual the Four run into the rogue Inhuman Crystal. Johnny sees her and instantly falls in love, similar to the Johnny and Crystal in the 616 continuity. She has run away from Attilan because she does not want to marry Maximus, brother of Black Bolt. The FF help her avoid the marriage, and she rewards Johnny with a kiss before the Inhumans depart.

=== Crossover (#21–23) ===
- Published between: September 2005 - November 2005
- Creators: writer Mark Millar, artist Greg Land
- Plot outline:In issues #21-23 Reed receives contact from an older version of himself from an alternate dimension. After crossing over, Reed discovers he has been duped and it was instead an alternate Earth where all the superheroes became zombies. This storyline was promoted as a crossover with the mainstream Marvel Universe (Earth-616), which turned out to be a red herring. This led to the Marvel Zombies limited series, which started in December 2005.
- Notes:

=== Tomb of Namor (#24–26) ===
- Published between: December 2005 - February 2006
- Creators: writer Mark Millar, artist Greg Land
- Plot outline: Reed, Sue and Ben explore Atlantis in a bathyscaphe. Namor surfaces, and the FF subdue him, with Reed noting that Namor's strength "is completely off the scale". Namor makes various threats, in a misguided romantic overture to Sue. He leaves after threatening NY with a sea-giant; receiving a kiss from Sue as payment for not flooding the city.

=== President Thor (#27–29) ===
- Published between: April 2006 - June 2006
- Creators: writer Mark Millar, artist Greg Land
- Plot outline: The Fantastic Four travel back in time and attempt to erase the accident which gave them their powers, inadvertently changing history so that Thor is the President of the United States and almost everyone on Earth has superpowers thanks to the Skrulls. Ben is the only unpowered human left, and he takes advantage of that fact to correct the timeline.
- First appearances: Skrulls, Super-Skrull
- Notes: In this storyline, the name "Chitauri" is retconned to be the name of a terrorist faction within the Skrull race as opposed to the name for the Skrull race as a whole.

=== Frightful (#30–32) ===
- Published between: July 2006 - October 2006
- Creators: writer Mark Millar, artist Greg Land
- Plot outline:In issues #30-32 Johnny has one week to live, and only Doctor Doom can help him. Meanwhile, the Frightful Four escape. Ben spends time with Alicia Masters, whom he met in issue #29. Doom has sickened Johnny, and he cures him in exchange for switching bodies with Reed. Doctor Doom battles the Frightful Four as well as exiling himself to the Zombie Universe along with the removed parasite from Johnny's body, and ends up battling the Zombie Galacti that just gained the powers of Galactus with the outcome of the fight unknown.

== Mike Carey returning ==
=== Ultimate Fantastic Four Annual #2 ===
- Published: October 2006
- Creators: writer Mike Carey, artist Stuart Immonen, Frazer Irving
- Plot outline: Thunderbolt Ross is touring the relocated Think Tank in Pinhead Buttes, Oregon when it suddenly begins to sink beneath the ground, as the Fantastic Four arrive above and Reed reaches the conclusion that the Mole Man is responsible. Meanwhile, Molekevic is explaining his plans to the Think Tank and goes into a lengthy recollection of his childhood in Yugoslavia, his work with the Soviet military, his studies in western Europe, and his fondness for wearing women's clothing. The Think Tank children eventually chase away Molekevic, the Fantastic Four and the government officials, intending to recolonize the subterranean city. The final page implies that their reactivation of the artificial sun either awakens or attracts the various giant monsters and abominations hiding in the depths, which serve as a defense for the Think Tank children from the government coming back for them.

=== God War (#33–38) ===
- Published between: October 2006 - February 2007
- Creators: writer Mike Carey, artist Pasqual Ferry
- Plot outline: Seed Nineteen show up and attack the FF while looking for "the seed." The seed informs Seed Nineteen that they will need the FF's help to defeat Gallowglass, and the groups team up to do so. They are all transported to an alternate dimension, and interact with Thanos and Ronan the Accuser.
- Notes: God War is a modern version of the 616 Fantastic Four's first encounter with the Kree. It starts a larger arc that continued in the next two arcs of length 3-4 issues and 3 issues. According to Mike Carey, Gallowglass's powers are on the same level as Thor's.

=== Devils (#39–41) ===
- Published between: February 2007 - April 2007
- Creators: writer Mike Carey, artist Mark Brooks, Scott Kolins
- Plot outline: Diablo, a magician from the past, looks to the future for the 'elementals' he needs, which turn out to be the Fantastic Four. To challenge them, he kidnaps Franklin Storm, Ben's mother, Johnny's girlfriend, and Reed's sister. After Diablo appears in the future, the Four must accept his challenge to save their loved ones.

=== The Silver Surfer (#42–46) ===
- Published between: May 2007-September 2007
- Creators: writer Mike Carey, artist Pasqual Ferry
- Plot outline: Reed Richards' attempts to create a Cosmic Cube have caused him to pierce the barriers of a hundred universes, and falling through the opening into the main reality is the keeper of the Power Cosmic, the Silver Surfer. The leader of the Silver Surfer's planet turns Earth into a world where everyone is happy, but different. With the help of the Surfer, Reed Richards restores the Earth to normal and turns the Psycho-Man's mind into a childish persona, babbling about flowers and silver men.
- Notes: As a reference to the Fantastic Four film series, Johnny is shown sporting the same short cut hairstyle sported by his film counterpart.

=== Ghosts (#47–49) ===
- Published between: October 2007-December 2007
- Creators: writer Mike Carey, artist Mark Brooks
- Plot outline: Susan heads to a conference in Siberia when her helicopter is shot down for reasons unknown. With her survival in doubt, Reed Richards must abandon his completion of the Cosmic Cube at its most crucial time to confront the Crimson Dynamo. While Reed, Ben and Johnny fight Dynamo, Sue confronts the Red Ghost. After an intense battle, which includes another four Crimson Dynamo models, they triumph and return to New York, only to find it encased in a box similar to the cube Reed created.

=== Four Cubed (#50–53) ===
- Published between: January 2008-April 2008
- Creators: writer Mike Carey, artist Tyler Kirkham
- Plot outline: The inter-dimensional war that the Fantastic Four have been involved in and around has dragged them back in once more as Thanos attempts to finally claim the Cosmic Cube from Reed at any cost. The events of the arc play out as Reed and Thanos each make their plays for the Cosmic Cube. Reed eventually defeats Thanos but it is revealed a paradox existed in which the present events were the cause of Thanos getting the Cube in the past.

=== Salem's Seven (#54–57) ===
- Published between: May 2008-August 2008
- Creators: writer Mike Carey, art Tyler Kirkham, Eric Basaldua
- Plot outline: A parasitic creature infiltrates the Baxter Building and poses as Agatha Harkness, a psychiatrist from S.H.I.E.L.D. Harkness can split into seven alternate bodies at will, which pose as a superhero team calling themselves Salem's Seven. Namor reveals that Harkness is from a species called the Hydra, which were responsible for the destruction of Atlantis. Harkness kidnaps Johnny in order to use his energy to hatch a Hydra nest, but Reed manages to destroy both her and the Hydra nest.

== Joe Pokaski ==
=== Ultimatum (#58–60) ===
- Published between: November 2008-February 2009
- Creators: writer Joe Pokaski, artist Tyler Kirkham, Eric Basaldua
- Plot outline: Sue is left in a coma after trying to turn back a tidal wave in Ultimatum #1. Ben cares for Sue in the absence of Reed, who is investigating the destruction, and Johnny, who is missing. When Ben and the Mole Man shrink to enter Sue's body and repair the damage, they discover security nanites placed inside her by Reed. A now-conscious Sue plans to use Reed's nanites to locate Johnny.

=== Ultimatum: Fantastic Four Requiem #1 ===
- Published between: August 2009
- Creators: writer Joe Pokaski, artist Robert Atkins
- Plot outline: The conclusion to the previous story arc that took place during Ultimatum, as well as the bridge between Ultimate Fantastic Four and Ultimate Comics: Doomsday.

== Collected editions ==
Ultimate Fantastic Four has been collected in the following trade paperbacks:

Trade Paperbacks
Vol. #	Title	Material collected	ISBN
Volume 1	The Fantastic	Ultimate Fantastic Four #1–6	0-7851-1393-2
Volume 2	Doom	Ultimate Fantastic Four #7–12	0-7851-1457-2
Volume 3	N-Zone	Ultimate Fantastic Four #13–18	0-7851-1495-5
Volume 4	Inhuman	Ultimate Fantastic Four #19-20, Annual #1	0-7851-1667-2
Volume 5	Crossover	Ultimate Fantastic Four #21–26	0-7851-1802-0
Volume 6	Frightful	Ultimate Fantastic Four #27–32	0-7851-2017-3
Volume 7	God War	Ultimate Fantastic Four #33-38	0-7851-2174-9
Volume 8	Devils	Ultimate Fantastic Four #39–41, Annual #2	0-7851-2450-0
Volume 9	Silver Surfer	Ultimate Fantastic Four #42–46	0-7851-2547-7
Volume 10	Ghosts	Ultimate Fantastic Four #47–53	0-7851-2898-0
Volume 11	Salem's Seven	Ultimate Fantastic Four #54–57	0-7851-2447-0
N/A	Ultimatum: X-Men/Fantastic Four	Ultimate X-Men #98–100, Ultimate Fantastic Four #58-60	0-7851-3433-6

Ultimate Fantastic Four has also been collected in the following hardcovers:

Oversized Hardcovers
Title	Years Covered	Material Collected	Pages	Released	ISBN
Volume 1	2004-2005	Ultimate Fantastic Four #1-12	320	22 June 2005	0-7851-1458-0
Volume 2	2005	Ultimate Fantastic Four #13-20, Annual #1	240	19 July 2006	0-7851-2058-0
Volume 3	2005-2006	Ultimate Fantastic Four #21-32	296	20 June 2007	0-7851-2603-1
Volume 4	2006-2007	Ultimate Fantastic Four #33-41, Annual #2; Ultimate X-Men/Fantastic Four #1; Ultimate Fantastic Four/X-Men #1	195	14 November 2007	0-7851-2872-7
Volume 5	2007-2008	Ultimate Fantastic Four #42-53	288	03 September 2008	0-7851-3082-9
Volume 6	2008	Ultimate Fantastic Four #54-57; Official Handbook Of The Ultimate Marvel Universe #1-2; Ultimate Secrets.	252	12 August 2009	0-7851-3781-5
Ultimatum Companion	2008-2009	Ultimate Fantastic Four #58–60; Ultimatum Fantastic Four: Requiem #1; Ultimate Spider-Man #129–133; Ultimatum Spider-Man: Requiem #1–2; Ultimate X-Men #98–100; Ultimatum X-Men: Requiem #1; March on Ultimatum Saga; Marvel Spotlight: Ultimatum	488	15 June 2011	978-0-7851-5507-2

Omnibus Editions
#	Title	Years Covered	Material Collected	Pages	Released	ISBN
1	Ultimate Fantastic Four Vol. 1	2004-2006	Ultimate Fantastic Four #1-32, Annual #1	856	18 March 2025	Stuart Immonen cover: ISBN 978-1302963668
1	Ultimate Fantastic Four Vol. 1	2004-2006	Ultimate Fantastic Four #1-32, Annual #1	856	18 March 2025	Jae Lee DM cover: ISBN 978-1302963675

== See also ==
- Ultimate Galactus Trilogy
- Ultimate X4
- Ultimate Power
- Ultimate Comics: Doomsday
- Ultimate X-Men (story arcs)
- Ultimate Spider-Man (story arcs)
