= Marvel Zombies vs. The Army of Darkness =

2007 comic book limited series by Marvel

- Cover to Marvel Zombies vs. The Army of Darkness #1. Art by Arthur Suydam.

Publication information
- Publisher: Marvel Comics; Dynamite Entertainment
- Schedule: Monthly
- Format: Limited series
- Genre: Superhero
- Publication date: May - September 2007
- No. of issues: 5
- Main character(s): The Marvel Zombies; Ash Williams

Creative team
- Written by: John Layman
- Artist(s): Fabiano Neves; Fernando Blanco; Sean Phillips
- Letterer(s): Randy Gentile; Rus Wooton
- Colorist: June Chung
- Editor(s): John Barber; Nicole Boose; Randy Gentile; Joe Quesada

Collected editions
- Hardcover: ISBN 0-7851-2743-7

Marvel Zombies vs. The Army of Darkness is a five-issue 2007 American comic book limited series published by Marvel Comics in association with Dynamite Entertainment, an intercompany crossover in which Ash Williams, the protagonist of the Evil Dead franchise, finds himself in the Marvel Zombies universe, a world of flesh-eating, zombified Marvel characters.

The crossover is continuous with the Marvel Zombies prequel Marvel Zombies: Dead Days and explains events happening in the prequel (such as information regarding the zombified Sentry, who initially spread the plague).

Prior to the release of the first issue, Newsarama published a preview, revealing the birth of the zombified Avengers, Ash's descent into the Marvel Zombie universe, and the infection of Spider-Man.

The "Werewolf Spider-Man" introduced during the closing moments of the series made his cinematic debut in the 2023 feature film Spider-Man: Across the Spider-Verse, depicted as a member of Miguel O'Hara's Spider-Society.

== Plot ==
Following Ash's death in the previous 'Army of Darkness' storyline The Death of Ash, he is now in (what appears to be) Heaven. The Sentry appears in the afterlife, having been sent there by the Watcher in Marvel Zombies Return, and begins consuming everyone in sight. Ash and the Sentry end up shunted into another reality (again by the Watcher according to Marvel Zombies Return). Along the way, Ash receives a prophecy warning him that "an army of the dead will rise" and that this world will fall.

In this alternative version of the Marvel Universe known as Earth-2149, Ash encounters a fight between Daredevil and Thunderball. He mistakes Daredevil for the villain, and after letting Thunderball escape, tries to warn the Avengers of a Deadite invasion. They do not believe him, mostly due to his buffoonery while hitting on the female members of the team. Scarlet Witch teleports Ash away, as Edwin Jarvis tells the team of a disturbance.

When Ash spots the now infected Avengers, he says he tried to warn them, and Spider-Man arrives and takes Ash off with a request from Colonel America. While Ash tells his side of the story to Spider-Man, Colonel America attacks and bites Spider-Man on the left shoulder, who seemingly drops Ash on the ground in front of some zombified Avengers. Realizing Ash is right and that his body is fighting the infection, Spider-Man bluffs and says he wants to eat Ash and carries him off, only to abandon him when he goes to check on his Aunt May and wife Mary Jane. In the prequel comic Marvel Zombies: Dead Days, it is revealed that Spider-Man is eventually 'consumed' by the zombification disease and kills and devours his loved ones.

Ash then encounters the Punisher, who gives Ash a bag of spare weapons and shoots and presumably kills Kingpin, Hammerhead and the Owl. On the ground, Punisher kills Thunderball, who is fending off his zombified Wrecking Crew allies, who then turn on Punisher. Ash bumps into Dazzler, who takes him to Doctor Strange's headquarters. Simultaneously, this reality's version of Ash, who had decided to fight the zombies, joins Dazzler. This reality's Ash is killed by a zombie Howard the Duck, who is in turn killed by the main version of Ash and the Scarlet Witch.

In Strange's mansion, Ash, Dazzler and the Scarlet Witch search for the Necronomicon, as Ash suspects that this is a Deadite invasion. Since there is no Necronomicon in the mansion, the trio travel to Latveria, the castle of Doctor Doom, which is under attack by an invasion force (from Dead Days, where Reed Richards turned his Fantastic Four into zombies upon deciding this infection is the most efficient form of life). Doom has Ash imprisoned with the other survivors for acting like an idiot. Ash then steals a Doombot's armor, disguises himself as Doom, and roams around Doomstadt.

While wandering, Ash meets the Enchantress, held prisoner by Doom, and frees her. When he takes her to Scarlet Witch and Dazzler, Enchantress drops her illusion, revealing that she is a zombie, and bites off Dazzler's finger, whereupon Doom kills both women with an energy blast. The zombies break into the castle; Scarlet Witch is attacked and infected by the zombified Punisher, and Doom is bitten and infected by Reed Richards, but manages to escape and fight back the disease to aid his people's escape to an alternate universe.

Ash locates this world's Necronomicon, but the talking book says that it cannot stop the zombie plague because the zombies are not Deadites. The book reveals that yes, an "army of the dead will rise" and yes, the world will fall, but that those two things don't necessarily have anything to do with each other, apart from happening around the same time. Ash threatens the Necronomicon, saying that when the human food supply is exhausted, the zombies will eat the book because it is bound in human flesh, and the Necronomicon decides to cooperate. On Ash's orders, it raises the zombie victims up as Deadites, distracting the zombies long enough for Doom to teleport Ash to a parallel world of his choosing and the survivors to a safe haven.

The invading zombies attack Doom just as Ash escapes. The zombies, upon finding the Necronomicon, reveal to it that they would never eat a book, and the zombified Wolverine hands the book over to the Hulk for use as toilet paper. Going through multiple alternate worlds, Ash accidentally chooses an alternate Earth populated by Marvel superhero werewolves and is pursued yet again. Ash is revealed to have somehow escaped from this Earth and returned to his own Earth by the following 'Army of Darkness' storyline, From The Ashes.

== Covers ==
The cover of each issue of the Marvel Zombies vs. Army of Darkness mini-series is a parody and/or homage of a famous cover from Marvel history, featuring zombie versions of the characters. All cover art is by Arthur Suydam. In each, Ash is spliced in alongside zombified characters or replacing a character on the original cover.

- #1, 1st printing is a homage to X-Men #141 by John Byrne.
- #1, variant printing is a homage to Uncanny X-Men #137 by John Byrne.
- #1, 2nd printing is a homage to Captain America #1 by Jack Kirby.
- #2, is a homage to Uncanny X-Men #268 by Jim Lee.
- #3, is a homage to Superman vs. The Amazing Spider-Man by Ross Andru.
- #3, variant printing is a homage to The Death of Captain Marvel GN by Jim Starlin.
- #4, is a homage to Captain America #100 by Jack Kirby.
- #5, is a homage to Wolverine #1 by Frank Miller.

== Collected editions ==
The series has been collected into one volume:

- Marvel Zombies vs. The Army of Darkness (128 pages, hardcover, September 2007, ISBN 0-7851-2743-7)

== In other media ==
- The "Werewolf Spider-Man" introduced during the closing moments of the series appears in Spider-Man: Across the Spider-Verse as a member of Miguel O'Hara's Spider-Society.
