= Ultimate Fantastic Four =

Comic book series

- Cover to Ultimate Fantastic Four #39; Art by Salvador Larroca

Publication information
- Publisher: Marvel Comics
- Schedule: Monthly
- Format: Ongoing series
- Genre: Superhero
- Publication date: February 2004 – February 2009
- No. of issues: 60
- Main character(s): Reed Richards; Susan Storm; Johnny Storm; Benjamin Grimm

Creative team
- Created by: Brian Michael Bendis; Mark Millar; Adam Kubert (based upon the original characters by Stan Lee and Jack Kirby)
- Written by: Brian Michael Bendis and Mark Millar (#1–6); Warren Ellis (#7–18); Mike Carey (#19–20, 33–57, Ultimate X4 #1–2, Annual 2); Mark Millar (#21–32, Annual 1); Joe Pokaski (#58–60, FF/X-Men Annual #1–2, Ultimate Requiem)
- Penciller(s): Adam Kubert (#1–6, 13–18); Stuart Immonen (#7–12, Annual 2); Jae Lee (#19–20, Annual 1); Greg Land (#21–32); Frazer Irving (Annual 2); Pasqual Ferry (#33–38, 42–46, Ultimate X4 #1–2); Leinil Francis Yu (Ultimate X4 #2); Scott Kolins (#39–41); Mark Brooks (#39–41, 47–49); Tyler Kirkham (#50–60); Eric Nguyen (FF/X-Men Annual #1); Dan Panosian (FF/X-Men Annual #2); Robert Atkins (Ultimate Requiem)

Ultimate Fantastic Four is a superhero American comic book series published by Marvel Comics. The series is a modernized re-imagining of Marvel's long-running Fantastic Four comic book franchise as part of the Ultimate Marvel imprint. The Ultimate Fantastic Four team exists alongside other revamped Marvel characters in Ultimate Marvel titles including Ultimate Spider-Man, Ultimate X-Men and The Ultimates.

While the characters remain relatively faithful to their original Marvel Universe conception, they differ in a number of notable aspects. The origin story of the team is modified and modernized and the team is much younger, being in their late teens to early 20s. The series revolves around the adventures of teen genius: Reed Richards, his childhood friend: Ben Grimm, and siblings: Susan and Johnny Storm, who get engulfed in a malfunctioned teleporter experiment and begin to develop super-powers: Reed can stretch his body to impossible lengths, Susan can project force fields and turn invisible, Johnny develops pyrokinetic super-powers and Ben is transformed into a rocky-skinned figure with super-human strength and durability. The series takes place in contemporary New York City and was met with mostly favorable responses from readers and critics, with the fresh, unique and modernized re-imagining of the classic Fantastic Four mythos, the artwork and the writing runs of Millar, Bendis and Ellis, being points of praise, while criticism was aimed at the perceived decline in quality of the writing, as the series progressed.

The title was created by Brian Michael Bendis, Mark Millar and Adam Kubert. The series debuted in early 2004 and had a monthly publishing schedule. Issue #60, the last of the series, was written by Joe Pokaski and drawn by Tyler Kirkham and was followed by a series epilogue in Ultimate Fantastic Four: Requiem.

== Publication history ==
Ultimate Fantastic Four was the fifth continuing series of the Ultimate Marvel series, after Ultimate Spider-Man, Ultimate X-Men and The Ultimates and Ultimate Marvel Team-Up. The first writers assigned by project leader Bill Jemas were Mark Millar (The Ultimates, Ultimate X-Men) and Brian Michael Bendis (Ultimate Spider-Man, Ultimate X-Men), who had both previously written comics in the Ultimate Marvel universe. Grant Morrison was involved in conceptualizing Ultimate Fantastic Four and was at one point set to write the series. However, Morrison departed from Marvel for an exclusivity contract with DC Comics before this could be finalized. Bryan Hitch designed the costumes for the characters, thus explaining their aesthetic resemblance to the costumes worn by the protagonists of The Ultimates.

In the Ultimate Fantastic Four Vol. 1 hardcover edition, Millar and Bendis write about the somewhat odd circumstances of their collaboration. Foremost, virtual communication was the only method available as Millar lives in Glasgow, Scotland, and Bendis in Portland, Oregon. Secondly, they both had considerably different writing styles, as Millar's stories are typically fast-paced and widescreen, while Bendis' output is more dialogue-heavy and slow-paced and both writers feared it could wreck the project. It was agreed that Millar would write the plot and Bendis finalized the scripts based on his plots.

Millar completely rewrote the origin for the protagonists because he was not satisfied with the original 1961 story, in which the four team members steal a space craft to beat the Soviets to the moon. In their version, Millar and Bendis wrote a story in which Reed Richards is a child prodigy, protected by his burly friend Ben Grimm from bullies, who had invented a method of teleportation in his youth. He is discovered by government official Willie Lumpkin, and subsequently recruited into a think tank/school located in the upper floors of the Baxter Building. There he meets Professor Storm, who leads the project, and his children, bioengineer Susan Storm and her younger brother Johnny. Reed also becomes the rival of Victor Van Damme, a fellow student. When Reed turns 21, he plans to teleport an apple into a parallel universe (the "N-Zone"), but Van Damme claims Reed's calculations are wrong and changes the setup at the last minute. The five students are teleported through the N-Zone, and when they rematerialize, they are heavily mutated. After the Fantastic Four return to the Baxter Building, they face their first opponent, Mole Man.

Although staying relatively true to the original stories, Millar's storylines and writing deviated from the original source material in notable ways, almost bypassing the original works by Stan Lee and Jack Kirby. Most notable were changes to the characters' personality and backgrounds. The character of Reed Richards, in the mainstream Marvel Comics super-intelligent and a true leader, had his previous role split, with Professor Storm taking his leader traits, while the 21-year-old idealist Reed retains his super-intelligence. Reed no longer automatically assumes leadership of the team in demanding situations, a role more often filled by Sue Storm. She was little more than a damsel in distress in the early comics, but in this version, she is the most head-strong and assertive member of the team, and has a gift for biochemistry and bioengineering. Ben Grimm, no longer Reed's college friend but his grade-school friend, is not as intelligent and has to have science explained to him, providing an opportunity for plot dumps.

In the end, both writers were satisfied with the results. Millar and Bendis stated that they had many more ideas, but massive scheduling problems forced them out. Instead, they persuaded Warren Ellis to continue the series. Ellis wrote the next arc, "Doom", centering on Victor Van Damme. He made Van Damme a descendant of Dracula, a boy whose childhood ended when he was 10, formed by his severe, authoritarian father. Ellis also fleshed out the hard science fiction element behind the FF, namely writing that they gained their powers because the teleportation changed their "phase space condition" into something from an alternate universe; in laymen's terms, there are multiple conceivable states of an object, a 'phase space' of all the possible ways they could be. While in the N-Zone, each one of them mutated into another form that they could have been. It was also explained that Reed's body functions because his cells were replaced with "pliable bacterial stacks", single cells which duplicate most of the larger functions of the human body and does not rip or tear when he extends.

The next arc "N-Zone" has the four traveling on the spaceship Awesome (a name of Johnny's choice) to the dimension where they got their powers. They encounter an alien named Nihil whose dimension has only a few hundred thousand years left before succumbing to an entropic heat death, and wishes to escape from his world to ours.

In "Think Tank" the team meet Rhona Burchill (a re-imagined Mad Thinker), who captures them and attempts to sell them to the highest bidder. In Ultimate Fantastic Four Annual #1, they meet Crystal of the Inhumans, and as a result of trespassing on their home destroy it, forcing the Inhumans to move to a new one. "Crossover" has them encountering zombie-infected versions of themselves and every other hero of that world. With the help of that world's Magneto, the Fantastic Four manage to escape with the few survivors. "Tomb of Namor" has the Four encountering Atlantian criminal Namor who only leaves when he gets a kiss from Susan Storm. In "Super-Skrull" Reed Richards goes back in time to the teleportation accident to ensure it does not go wrong. There is dispute amongst the team whether this is the right course of action. However, after a cruel prank played by Johnny Storm on Ben Grimm, the team realize just how depressed Ben is being trapped inside 'the Thing'. Reed goes back and makes the experiment a success. This alters the timeline so that everyone on the planet except Ben has superpowers thanks to the Skrull pill given to them by the Skrulls and the leader Super-Skrull. The Skrulls however have tricked humanity and the still-human Ben Grimm is their last hope. In "Frightful", Johnny is infected with an illness only Doctor Doom can cure; it also features the escape of the Frightful Four. In "God War", alien terrorists attack Reed, who is looking for a seed while also facing a powerful enemy. The next arc "Devils" introduces Diablo who kidnaps those close to the four as bait; he intends to get immortality by using Reed's sister as a power source.

Ultimate Fantastic Four, along with Ultimate X-Men was canceled after the events of the 2008 – 2009 Ultimatum miniseries.

The members of the team are the focus of Ultimate Comics: Doomsday.

=== Ultimate FF ===
A new volume dubbed Ultimate FF (with "FF" standing for "Future Foundation", not "Fantastic Four") was launched in April 2014, starring Invisible Woman, Iron Man, the Falcon, Machine Man, Phil Coulson and Victor van Damme. The title was written by Joshua Hale Fialkov and Stuart Moore, with art by Mario Guevara, Tom Grummett and André Araújo. In August 2014 with the release of issue 6, Ultimate FF was officially cancelled.

== Team roster ==
=== Reed Richards / Mister Fantastic / Maker ===
Reed is a child genius who displayed his curiosity from the day he was born. At the age of 11, following a demonstration of his research on the field of teleportation at a school science fair, Reed was recruited for a government program which sponsors young geniuses' research. He continued his research at the government research facility located in Manhattan's Baxter Building. At the age of 21, his research was realized as he and several others attempted to teleport organic material through an alternate plane of existence called the N-Zone. The experiment went awry giving Reed and several others superpowers. His powers enable him to stretch his body parts to incredible lengths and endow him with enhanced durability.

Reed's powers have been increased in comparison to that of his Earth-616 counterpart. He no longer needs to eat nor sleep, and has no internal organs or bones. He can stretch his eyes, specifically the lens so that he does not need his glasses or any other visual augmentation but can only sustain this for short periods. Sue's mother revealed that she knows that Reed's abilities allow him to stretch his brain in order to accommodate and solve almost any problem thus making him effectively a human computer. While Threshold calls him a 'warrior without equal' in "God War" this almost certainly refers to his success in discovering a way to defeat an undefeatable foe (Ultimate Ronan) as opposed to actual battlefield prowess. Sue lauds his expertise in physics.

After Ultimatum, Reed left the Baxter Building and returned home much to the chagrin of his father. In Ultimate Enemy #1, the Richards' house was bombed by an unknown individual. Reed Richards is presumed to be dead. In Ultimate X-Men/Fantastic Four Annual #1, a young Franklin Richards is part of a future team of X-Men. It is also revealed that in all of the possible futures, Franklin is Reed and Sue's son. In Ultimate Mystery #3, Reed Richards is revealed to be alive and is seen aiding or leading the aliens to pillage the artifacts stored at Project Pegasus. As the story unfolds, it becomes clear that Reed Richards' world view has changed, and he has become a villain known as the Maker. Later he assembles part of the Infinity Gauntlet.

=== Susan Storm / Invisible Woman ===
The eldest child of scientist Franklin Storm, Sue Storm inherited her father's genius at an early age. Since early childhood, she has been one of the prodigies studying and working at the Baxter Building, a midtown Manhattan government research lab. Following her father into physics, at age eight she built a sugar-power rocket and accidentally destroyed her father's car, after which she changed her focus to "inner space" biology. Romancing brilliant Baxter Building classmate Reed Richards, Sue became a distinguished scientist as well, earning four doctorates in bio-chemical sciences.

Attending the Nevada desert testing of Reed's N-Zone dimensional teleporter, Sue was transported a mere three miles (5 km) into the desert by the device's malfunction. She was discovered by former Baxter Building instructor Dr. Arthur Molekevic, who took her to his underground facilities below Manhattan, calmed her, and helped her gain control of her new abilities, while he sent a "monster" to the Baxter Building to retrieve three who had been transformed by the N-Zone experiment. In the company of those three, Susan fled Molekevic and used her invisible protective force field to take them back to the surface.

Making the study of herself and her three partners her new life's work, Sue spent months investigating their abilities and charting their powers while improving her own understanding of herself. She has deduced the nature of both Reed and Johnny's changes, though her own powers remain unexplained and she is unable to penetrate Ben's skin to determine any more detail than his internal fluid pressure. Sue continues to develop her control of her force fields, using them to create pressurized environments at the bottom of the sea, plugging her own throat to prevent swallowing poison gas, and creating "cushions" to catch falling people and objects. Damage to her force fields also causes her mental strain or, in extreme cases (Ultimate Power #5), to black out.

Susan has proven capable of standing her own, and after the team went public, she assumed the codename "Invisible Woman". Her force fields have been the Four's ace in the hole, saving their lives when Nihil dumped Reed and Ben into the near-vacuum of the N-Zone and single-handedly stopping the time-traveling Chrono-Bandits. She co-created the chrono-tunnel with Reed, and has conducted biological studies of the Kree alien Mahr Vehl and extra-dimensional life in the N-Zone.

Though her newfound fame has brought her unsought attention from the likes of billionaire playboy Tony Stark and the Atlantian criminal Namor, she remains romantically attached to Reed despite her concerns about his over-devotion to science. As it was shown in Ultimate Secret #2, she is also more sexually forward than her original counterpart.

Sue has the power to render herself and others invisible to the naked eye. She also has the power to generate nearly impenetrable invisible force fields. Sue can manipulate her force fields in a variety of ways, including levitating herself and others, firing destructive force-blasts, and causing objects to explode by projecting and expanding force fields inside them.

=== Benjamin Grimm / Thing ===
Gifted physically as a youth, Ben Grimm is Reed's best "and only" friend. When they were in school together, Ben would protect Reed from various bullies, including ones "three years younger", and in exchange Reed would help Ben with his math homework. Ben moved on to college and was invited to watch Reed's teleportation experiment. Grimm woke up as the Thing in Mexico City. The teleportation through the N-Zone gave him an orange rocky hide which boosts his strength and makes him nigh-invulnerable to physical damage and physiologically stressful conditions (such as a toxic breathing environment), and he no longer feels differences in temperature. Despite Ben's seeming happy-go-lucky disposition, the transformation has caused deep psychological trauma. In the "Diablo" arc, he is briefly transformed to blue. At the end of Ultimate Doomsday, Sue proposes to him and he accepts.

After Ultimatum and the dissolution of the Fantastic Four, Ben approached General Ross and asked to enlist in the Air Force. In Ultimate Enemy #1, he returns to the Baxter Building to see Sue, and confesses that he is in love with her. Ben never acted on it because of Reed. Ben also developed the ability to turn into a purple-skinned glowing form and back again at will.

=== Johnny Storm / Human Torch ===
Susan Storm's younger brother is a short-tempered teen, who is enamored with good-looking girls and has a rock-star attitude. The obvious "cool factor" of his powers only serves to heighten these personality traits: Johnny's powers engulf him in flames that enable him to fly and shoot fiery projectiles. This power sometimes has detrimental effects on his body, as Johnny burns, or more accurately fuses, his own body-fat to provide his 'fuel', and every so often, he "hibernates" and sheds off the skin cells that protect him from his own flames, growing new ones. Regardless, he finds the idea of being a real superhero incredibly exciting and firmly intends to sign up with The Ultimates once he is old enough, rather than continue hanging around the Baxter Building with the nerds and geeks. He is indeed a high school dropout and a Spider-Man fan (he makes a guest appearance in the "Superstars" arc).

After witnessing his father die in the Ultimatum wave, Johnny has a breakdown at the Statue of Liberty and was captured by the demon Dormammu. Sue and Ben save him, and after Franklin Storm's funeral he leaves for Europe. In Ultimate Comics: Spider-Man #1, Johnny shows up on Peter Parker's doorstep, and Aunt May chooses to let him stay with them.

=== Team history ===
Up until the middle of the series' second year, the team did not use the above code names, nor were they referred to as The Fantastic Four. The lack of code names was a frequent source of humor for then writer Warren Ellis, who frequently had Sue, Ben and especially Johnny give themselves outlandish names like "Invisible Ninja-Girl", "Asbestos Thing" and "Human Dashboard Lighter". In the Ultimate Spider-Man "Superstars" arc and the Ultimate Spider-Man game, Johnny was referred as Human Torch and in the game, the team was the "world-famous" Fantastic Four.

== Villains ==
- Rhona Burchill: Rhona was a genius from birth, displaying an incredible intellect but severe mental problems. While being extremely bright, she would always cause trouble at any school she went to. Rhona was tested as an applicant for the Baxter Building's young think-tank, but did not pass the test primarily due to her troubled psych profile. Reed Richards was welcomed in her place. Desiring to prove her worth, Rhona accelerated her brain's processing speed to 600% beyond the normal, and she also surgically attached her brother's brain matter to her own to increase her own brain's capacity. The experiment horribly deformed Rhona's appearance (this deformity was absent in Ultimate X4). She is the Ultimate Universe's Mad Thinker, as evidenced by her declaration that, "if it is mad to think the unthinkable, then I'm the maddest thinker there ever was". She has also constructed her own version of the Awesome Android which appeared when she later stole Cerebro in order to improve her own intellect, but was defeated by a coalition of X-Men and Fantastic Four members. She is presumed dead after her vehicle exploded while trying to flee the scene.
- Diablo: An evil alchemist who kidnaps the Fantastic Four's friends and family to lure the Four into the past so that he may use their elemental powers to make himself immortal.
- Victor Van Damme / Doctor Doom: Victor Van Damme was also a member of the youth research project that recruited Reed and Susan, and sees science as an art as opposed to Reed's view of it as a system. Van Damme is a descendant of Vlad Tepes, better known as Dracula, ruler of Wallachia during the fifteenth century. As such, Van Damme is a member of European aristocracy and since his youth has also been a member of a secret society bent on achieving covert world domination. Van Damme saw the project as a means of achieving personal power. Van Damme worked with Richards on his device to teleport organic matter to the N-Zone. But on the day of the teleporter's full-scale test, Van Damme, arrogantly believing Reed's coordinates were incorrect, reprogrammed the coordinates of the device. Van Damme was also affected by the experiment: Most of his body was transformed into metal, his legs were reshaped into cloven hooves and his internal organs were converted into a toxic substance. Soon afterward, he returned to Latveria and led it from poverty to prosperity, changing his name to Doctor Doom. He proceeded to invest in the exploration of Atlantis, gleaning many spells and superior technology from it. He used one such spell to plant a world-threatening parasite in Johnny Storm, in order to force Reed Richards to ask Doom for help.
- Frightful Four: Hailing from the Marvel Zombies universe, the undead version of the Fantastic Four transported themselves into the Ultimate universe by tricking Ultimate Reed Richards into opening a dimensional portal. The Zombie Earth had run out of people to eat, and the zombified Fantastic Four were desperate for more. They were captured upon their arrival by their Ultimate counterparts the Thing, Human Torch and Invisible Woman. The zombies' only goal is to spread the infection of the "super-virus" they carry onto the heroes of the Ultimate universe, the only obstacle being their confinement within a reinforced holding cell in the Baxter Building. They eventually escaped, but were swiftly quarantined within the top forty levels of the building. They used a lab to reconfigure a portal to the Zombie universe in order to receive the assistance they needed to break through the shields around the Baxter Building. Ultimate Reed, in Doctor Doom's body, attacked them all. The zombie Human Torch was covered in Doom's concrete-like vomit, the Thing's arms were ripped off, and the Invisible Woman and Mister Fantastic were both defeated with one spell apiece. The Four were thrown through the portal back into the Zombie Universe.
- Gallowglass: The son of Thanos. A powerful warrior made from neutron-degenerate matter, a type of material found in the hearts of suns. This makes him incredibly strong and dense and, when he lowers his personal force field, it is 'spectacularly explosive'. He is seemingly killed by Susan Storm when she makes her force-field touch his, dissolving them both, causing Gallowglass to explode.
- Dr. Arthur Molekevic / Mole Man: Dr. Molekevic was performing forbidden experiments when he was expelled from the Baxter Building. It is suggested those experiments involve the creation of artificial sentient life forms from plant tissue. Molekevic was revealed to be schizophrenic, hearing voices in his head that he refers to as "they". After he was expelled, Molekevic disappeared into an underground realm where he established himself as the ruler. The name "Mole Man" is a name the students at the think tank would tease him with, due to his skin problems. At the end of his first encounter with the Fantastic Four he fell into a deep pit and was not seen again until his appearance in Ultimate Fantastic Four Annual #2.
- Namor: Namor was a mutant member of the Atlantean empire, but was imprisoned for unknown reasons. Unlike his Earth-616 counterpart, he is an outright villain rather than an anti-hero. In their first encounter, the Fantastic Four misinterpret the writing on his prison, mistaking it for a tomb, and that he is a prince and not a criminal. They release him, and after a short battle in which he defeats Johnny, and Ben knocks him out, the Fantastic Four take him back to the Baxter Building. He has romantic desires for Sue like his 616 counterpart, but becomes violent when she rejects his advances. His powers include super strength, flight, teleporting, summoning water elementals and the ability to survive underwater. He is extremely arrogant, and is referred to by Reed Richards as "possibly the most powerful metahuman on Earth". His extreme intelligence allows him to become fluent in English in a matter of minutes merely by listening to S.H.I.E.L.D. agents and the Fantastic Four talking.
- Nihil: Nihil is the transliterated name of the magistrate of a small alien community from within the N-Zone. The N-Zone is a universe in a state of slow entropic heat death, and Nihil's community consists of aliens who have gathered their spacecraft close to a dying sun for warmth. Nihil's unidentified species is apparently long-lived and he is, as such, frustrated that his universe will die long before he will reach the limits of his life expectancy. He wants to flee the dying N-Zone and claim the young new universe that Reed and his friends hail from. He follows the Fantastic Four to Earth, but is killed while attempting to dislodge a plasma gun from his mouth. He is the Ultimate Universe's Annihilus.
- Super-Skrull: The Skrull leader whose "anti-assassination suit" gives him the ability to mimic powers of anyone within a 1,000-mile (1,600 km) radius. His Skrull pills can give anyone superpowers, but they have a lethal side effect when activated. It is implied the Skrulls have conquered many worlds using the same Skrull pill. He is defeated by a non-superpowered Ben Grimm when he is the only human left on Earth but as he does not have any superpowers, the Super Skrull cannot mimic them. Out of his suit, he is seen as very fragile and begs Ben not to leave him as he will surely die in Earth's atmosphere without his suit. He says that he is over a billion years old.
- Thanos: The ruler of the Acheron Empire. He seems to be very powerful and rules thousands of worlds with an iron fist. He desires the creation of a Cosmic Cube so that he can erase the will of any who would oppose him. To this end, he has sought out Reed Richards, believing that Richards is capable of constructing the object.

== Appearances ==
- Ultimate Fantastic Four #1–60, Annual #1–2
- Ultimate Galactus Trilogy
- Ultimate X4 #1–2
- Ultimate Power
- Ultimate Fantastic Four/X-Men Annual
- Ultimate X-Men/Fantastic Four Annual
- Ultimate Fantastic Four Requiem
- Ultimate Doomsday Trilogy
- Ultimate Comics Ultimates

== Collected editions ==
Ultimate Fantastic Four has been collected in the following trade paperbacks:

Title	Material collected	Publication date	ISBN
Volume 1: The Fantastic	Ultimate Fantastic Four #1–6	July 28, 2004	ISBN 0-7851-1393-2
Volume 2: Doom	Ultimate Fantastic Four #7–12	December 9, 2004	ISBN 0-7851-1457-2
Volume 3: N-Zone	Ultimate Fantastic Four #13–18	June 8, 2005	ISBN 0-7851-1495-5
Volume 4: Inhuman	Ultimate Fantastic Four #19–20; Ultimate Fantastic Four Annual #1	September 24, 2005	ISBN 0-7851-1667-2
Volume 5: Crossover	Ultimate Fantastic Four #21–26	April 5, 2006	ISBN 0-7851-1802-0
Volume 6: Frightful	Ultimate Fantastic Four #27–32	October 18, 2006	ISBN 0-7851-2017-3
Volume 7: God War	Ultimate Fantastic Four #33–38	March 28, 2007	ISBN 0-7851-2174-9
Volume 8: Devils	Ultimate Fantastic Four #39–41; Ultimate Fantastic Four Annual #2	June 20, 2007	ISBN 0-7851-2450-0
Volume 9: Silver Surfer	Ultimate Fantastic Four #42–46	December 19, 2007	ISBN 0-7851-2547-7
Volume 10: Ghosts	Ultimate Fantastic Four #47–53	June 18, 2008	ISBN 0-7851-2898-0
Volume 11: Salem's Seven	Ultimate Fantastic Four #54–57	October 29, 2008	ISBN 978-0-7851-2447-4
Ultimate X-Men/Ultimate Fantastic Four	Ultimate X-Men/Ultimate Fantastic Four; Ultimate Fantastic Four/Ultimate X-Men Official Handbook of the Ultimate Marvel Universe #1–2	May 3, 2006	ISBN 978-0-7851-2292-0
Ultimatum: Ultimate Fantastic Four/Ultimate X-Men	Ultimate Fantastic Four #58–60; Ultimate X-Men #98–100	December 9, 2009	ISBN 0-7851-3433-6

Ultimate Fantastic Four also has been collected in the following oversized hardcovers:

Title	Material collected	Publication date	ISBN
Volume 1	Ultimate Fantastic Four #1–12	June 8, 2005	ISBN 0-7851-1458-0
Volume 2	Ultimate Fantastic Four #13–20; Ultimate Fantastic Four Annual #1	July 19, 2006	ISBN 0-7851-2058-0
Volume 3	Ultimate Fantastic Four #21–32	June 20, 2007	ISBN 0-7851-2603-1
Volume 4	Ultimate Fantastic Four #33–41; Ultimate Fantastic Four Annual #2; Ultimate X-Men/Ultimate Fantastic Four; Ultimate Fantastic Four/Ultimate X-Men (The latter two are the Ultimate X4 #1–2 issues listed under Appearances.)	November 14, 2007	ISBN 0-7851-2872-7
Volume 5	Ultimate Fantastic Four #42–53	September 3, 2008	ISBN 0-7851-3082-9
Volume 6	Ultimate Fantastic Four #54–57; Official Handbook of the Ultimate Marvel Universe #1–2; Ultimate Secrets	August 12, 2009	ISBN 0-7851-3781-5
Ultimatum Companion	Ultimate Fantastic Four #58–60; Ultimatum Fantastic Four: Requiem; Ultimate Spider-Man #129–133; Ultimatum Spider-Man: Requiem #1–2; Ultimate X-Men #98–100; Ultimatum X-Men: Requiem; March on Ultimatum Saga; Marvel Spotlight: Ultimatum	June 15, 2011	ISBN 978-0785155072

== In other media ==
=== Film ===
The 2015 film Fantastic Four was loosely based on Ultimate Fantastic Four.

=== Video games ===
- The Ultimate version of Human Torch appears in all versions of Ultimate Spider-Man except for Game Boy Advance.
- The Ultimate costumes of the Fantastic Four appear in Marvel: Ultimate Alliance and its sequel as well. Ultimate costume of Doctor Doom also appears in the first game.
- The Ultimate costumes of the Fantastic Four appear in Rise of the Silver Surfer.
- The Maker costume for Reed Richards appears in Marvel Rivals.

== See also ==
- List of Ultimate Fantastic Four story arcs
