= Marvel Zombies 5 =

Comic book series

- Cover of Marvel Zombies 5 1 (June 2010), art by Rafa Garres

Publication information
- Publisher: Marvel Comics
- Schedule: Monthly
- Format: Limited series
- Genre: Superhero
- Publication date: June – October 2010
- No. of issues: 5
- Main character(s): Morbius; Machine Man; Howard the Duck; Jacali Kane

Creative team
- Written by: Fred Van Lente
- Penciller: Jose Angel Cano Lopez
- Inker(s): Thomas Palmer Sr. Alvaro Lopez
- Letterer: Simon Bowland
- Colorist: Val Staples
- Editor(s): Michael Horwitz; Mark Paniccia

Collected editions
- Hardcover: ISBN 0-7851-4743-8

Marvel Zombies 5 is a five-issue American comic book limited series published by Marvel Comics beginning in June and ending in October 2010. It is part of the Marvel Zombies series. The series is written by Fred Van Lente, penciled by Jose Angel Cano Lopez, with covers by Greg Land.

== Plot synopsis ==
Morbius charges fellow A.R.M.O.R. agents, Machine Man and Howard the Duck, with retrieving different samples of zombies from each reality so that he can find a cure for his infected friend, Jacob Russell. Through their travel they are joined by Jacali Kane, the daughter of supervillain Harry Kane, also known as Hurricane whom before his death, transferred his powers to her.

The team travels through five realities. Each reality has its own version of the virus, mimicking a popular horror movie (Romero, Raimi, Boyle, etc.), featuring guest appearances from various Marvel figures from the Wild West, Killraven, Ultron, Thor, Jocasta and Arno Stark (future Iron Man, deceased).

Hurricane, his daughter, and Machine Man killed some zombies, but a group of revived zombies killed Hurricane.

Howard the Duck assembled Dum Dum Dugan and other uninfected people to perform Ducky's Dozen.

They got Killraven and Old Skull to join in with them. When Old Skull was bitten on the arm, his friends had no choice but to amputate his infected arm to prevent him to overpower his own friends as a new zombie, which is successful.

== Collected editions ==
The series has been collected into a single volume:

- Marvel Zombies 5 (120 pages, hardcover, November 2010, ISBN 0-7851-4743-8)
