= Marvel Zombies Return =

2009 limited series

- Cover of the 1st issue

Publication information
- Publisher: Marvel Comics
- Schedule: Weekly
- Format: Limited series
- Genre: Superhero
- Publication date: September 2009
- No. of issues: 5
- Main character: Zombie versions of Marvel Comics characters

Creative team
- Written by: Fred Van Lente; David Wellington; Jonathan Maberry; Seth Grahame-Smith
- Artist: Nick Dragotta
- Letterer: Simon Bowland
- Colorist: Lee Loughridge
- Editor(s): Michael Horwitz; Ralph Macchio; Joe Quesada; Bill Rosemann

Collected editions
- Hardcover: ISBN 0-7851-4277-0

Marvel Zombies Return is a weekly five-issue American comic book limited series, published by Marvel Comics in late 2009. It is part of the Marvel Zombies series of comic books.

== Publication history ==
Marvel Zombies Return is a weekly series of five one-shot comic books. Editor Bill Rosemann described how the concept came about:

A couple months ago a few of us in the office were talking about Marvel Zombies and about where we could take the story next. Our head of Sales David Gabriel brought up the fact that we hadn’t seen the most famous zombies – such as Spider-Man and Wolverine – since the end of Marvel Zombies 2. That led me to a conversation with fright master Fred Van Lente, who quickly dreamed up the creepy question of: Just where did those flesh-eaters disappear to after they were teleported into oblivion.

Unlike the other series, the series consists of a number of one-shots and linked by two bookend issues written by Fred Van Lente. As Van Lente was committed to other writing assignments, Marvel invited three authors who have written books on zombies to contribute the other issues: David Wellington (Monster Island), Jonathan Maberry (Patient Zero and Zombie CSU) and Seth Grahame-Smith (Pride and Prejudice and Zombies).

The issues are:

- Marvel Zombies Return: Spider-Man by writer Fred Van Lente and artist Nick Dragotta
- Marvel Zombies Return: Iron Man by writer David Wellington and artist Andrea Mutti
- Marvel Zombies Return: Wolverine by writer Jonathan Maberry and artist Jason Shawn Alexander
- Marvel Zombies Return: Hulk by writer Seth Grahame-Smith and artist Richard Elson
- Marvel Zombies Return: Avengers by writer Fred Van Lente and artist Wellington Alves

== Plot ==
Following Marvel Zombies 2, Earth-2149's surviving zombies (Spider-Man, Wolverine, Giant-Man, Wasp, and Luke Cage) and Black Panther are transported to an alternate universe by Malcolm Cortez.

The first issue revolves around the attempts of Zombie Spider-Man to cure himself of his condition when he lands on an Earth similar to his own, later designated "Earth-Z". Upon becoming aware that his counterpart from this universe is still in college and that Kingpin has yet to steal the Lifeline Tablet, the Zombie Spider-Man tries to recover it first to see if he can use it to cure himself and become a hero again. However, alerted by his presence, Kingpin hires the Sinister Six — Kraven the Hunter, Mysterio, Electro, Vulture, Doctor Octopus and Sandman to create a distraction so he can steal the tablet. However, Zombie Spider-Man ends up killing Kingpin and all the Sinister Six minus Sandman, who in turn brutally kills the Spider-Man of this Earth. Due his actions, however, the zombified members of the Sinister Six kill his friends and Zombie Spider-Man kills them to prevent spreading the contagion. The issue also advances the overarching storyline by having Zombie Giant-Man attack and eat Earth-Z's Uatu.

The second issue follows Earth-Z's Tony Stark, who is having alcoholism problems and is on the verge of selling Stark International and all patents to the Chinese, two years after Zombie Spider-Man's arrival to Earth-Z. Upon teletransporting himself to Stark International's basement in search of Stark's Inhuman technology, Zombie Giant-Man infects Happy Hogan, who in turn causes the infection of all people in the building except Tony Stark and James Rhodes, who makes his way to Tony's office and dons Stark's armor. After killing the zombified Pepper Potts with nanobots, Tony passes on the Iron Man armor to Rhodes and stays behind to be killed by the zombies while Rhodes leaves the building to destroy the remaining zombies, precluding the contagion from spreading further.

The third issue follows Earth-2149's Zombie Wolverine, who makes his way to Japan four years after his arrival to Earth-Z concurrently at the same time Earth-Z's Wolverine and Kitty Pryde are trying to dismantle the criminal operations of The Hand. As Zombie Wolverine devours Kitty's ninja pursuers, Zombie Spider-Man rescues Kitty and tells her about the origin of the plague and the vaccine he has created to control Zombie Wolverine's hunger. Meanwhile, Zombie Wolverine kills Shang-Chi, Elektra, Sunfire, and Iron Fist until Earth-Z's Wolverine appears, engaging in a fight. With the intervention of Kitty Pryde and Zombie Spider-Man, Wolverine manages to kill his zombie counterpart, his zombified victims and lets Zombie Spider-Man to get a sample of his blood to develop a cure, and while he becomes infected through unknown reasons, he resists the hunger and does not spread the contagion.

The fourth issue follows the return of Earth-Z's Hulk to the Blue Area of the Moon years after Zombie Wolverine's attack on Japan and following his banishment to Sakaar by the Illuminati. Upon arriving along with the Warbound, Hulk discovers Zombie Giant-Man and the zombified Inhumans, which leads to the deaths of all the Warbound members and with the former infecting him before he makes his way back to Earth. Back on home, the zombified Hulk starts devouring all citizens he can in New York City until the Illuminati contact the Sentry to stop him. However, reverting to his zombified human form, Hulk takes advantage to infect Sentry as well, leading Zombie Spider-Man to realize that things have gone too far and that they must act now.

The fifth issue ties these threads together, resolving the fates of all of the original Marvel Zombies. Years after Hulk's attack on NYC, Earth-Z has suffered the same fate Earth-2149 endured and there is no longer life on it, with the Avengers (Sentry, Moon Knight, Thundra, Quasar, Super-Skrull, Namor, and Quicksilver) revealed to have killed Earth-2149's Wasp, Luke Cage and Black Panther while Zombie Giant-Man is working on a dimensional teleporter to devour more universes. However, thanks to Earth-Z's zombified Professor X, the Avengers are led to a trap and engage in a battle against Zombie Spider-Man and the New Avengers (Earth-Z's Wolverine, Hulk, Iron Man and Sandman). Zombie Giant-Man then teletransports all of them to Uatu's laboratory to use Sentry to power the teleporter. However, the nanite-infused Sandman ends up killing all zombies present minus Sentry, who is trapped on the teletransporter. At the end, Earth-Z's Uatu reveals himself to be alive and sends the Sentry, the last Earth-Z Marvel Zombie, back through time and space to his arrival on Earth-2149 (the original Marvel Zombies universe). In doing so, it closes a time loop, which keeps the virus contained on Earth-2149 and Earth-91126.

== Collected editions ==
The series has been collected into a single volume:

- Marvel Zombies Return (120 pages, Marvel Comics, January 2010, hardcover, ISBN 0-7851-4277-0, softcover, ISBN 0-7851-4238-X)

== Reception ==
James Hunt reviewed the first issue for Comic Book Resources and expressed concerns that "the zombie fad is winding down, and the joke here seems to be how long a one-joke concept can be kept walking even though it's dead on its feet." However, he does praise Van Lente's comedic writing and Dragotta's art for evoking the Silver Age feeling but wonders if over-the-top violence does not "sit rather uneasily alongside the tone that the dialog and art are delivered in".
