= Fantastic Four: Rise of the Silver Surfer (video game) =

2007 video game

- North American PlayStation 2 cover art
- Developers: 7 Studios; Visual Concepts (PS3/X360); Hands-On Mobile (Mobile)
- Publisher: 2K
- Producer: Paul Weaver
- Designer: Chase Jones
- Writers: Flint Dille, John Zuur Platten
- Composer: Ron Fish
- Platforms: Mobile, PlayStation 2, PlayStation 3, Wii, Xbox 360, Nintendo DS
- Release: Mobile: NA: June 12, 2007; DS, PS2, PS3, X360: WW: June 15, 2007; Wii: NA: June 15, 2007; AU: June 15, 2007; EU: June 29, 2007
- Genre: Third-person action-adventure game
- Modes: Single-player, Multiplayer

Fantastic Four: Rise of the Silver Surfer is a 2007 video game based on the film of the same name and stars the Marvel Comics characters Fantastic Four and the Silver Surfer published by 2K. It is a sequel to the 2005 video game Fantastic Four, itself based on the film of the same name.

== Gameplay ==
The game allows the player to take on the role of any member of the Fantastic Four team and to switch characters at any time. Each of the characters has a special ability:

- Reed Richards/Mister Fantastic has the ability to shift his body into a super-malleable state, enabling him to stretch, or otherwise reshape his physical form at his will.
- Susan Storm/Invisible Woman possesses the ability to bend light and ultimately become invisible (wholly or partially) at will. She also has telekinetic powers and the ability to project force energy from her body.
- Johnny Storm/The Human Torch can manipulate fire. He usually allows his entire body to be engulfed in flames considering his body can sustain the highest levels of heat. He can also fly.
- Ben Grimm/The Thing is incredibly strong and with skin stronger than diamonds. Ben Grimm can also carry heavy objects with ease.

During the game, the player faces enemies from the Fantastic Four universe, such as Silver Surfer, Terrax, Red Ghost, Super-Skrull, and Doctor Doom.

In addition to missions featuring the whole team, there are various solo missions during the game, such as the Human Torch chasing the Silver Surfer through New York and Sue Storm using her invisibility powers to sneak through a Military Base.

The game also allows the use of fused attacks, giving the player the ability of combining powers to pull off new moves. There are 12 different moves in the game, one with each combination of team members. One example is Sue creating an energy field & Johnny filling it with flame, effectively creating a bomb. Another is Ben charging toward enemy hordes and Sue projecting spinning telekinetic blades around him.

== Reception ==
Reception

Aggregate scores
Aggregator	Score
GameRankings	(X360) 49.16% (PS3) 49% (Wii) 43.44% (PS2) 41.50% (DS) 38.40%
Metacritic	(PS3) 47/100 (X360) 45/100 (Wii) 39/100 (PS2) 36/100 (DS) 35/100

Review scores
Publication	Score
1Up.com	C−
Eurogamer	5/10
Game Informer	5/10
GameRevolution	C−
GameSpot	5/10 (DS) 3.5/10 (PS2 & Wii) 2.6/10
GameSpy	1.5/5 (PS2 & Wii) 1/5 (DS) 0.5/5
GameTrailers	5.3/10
GameZone	(PS3) 5.5/10 (X360) 5.3/10 (Wii) 4.6/10
IGN	5.4/10 (Wii) 5/10 (PS2) 4.7/10 (DS) 3.5/10
Nintendo Power	2/10
Official Xbox Magazine (US)	5.5/10

Hyper's Daniel Wilks commended the game for "being better than Pirates of the Caribbean: At World's End", but criticized it for being "dull, repetitive and lazy".
