= Uatu =

Marvel Comics fictional character

- Uatu, as he appeared in Fantastic Four vol. 6 #25 (October 2020). Art by R.B. Silva.

Publication information
- Publisher: Marvel Comics
- First appearance: The Fantastic Four #13 (April 1963)
- Created by: Stan Lee; Jack Kirby

In-story information
- Alter ego: Uatu
- Species: Watcher
- Notable aliases: Watcher
- Abilities: Vast cosmic powers Superhuman intelligence and scientific knowledge beyond Earth measuring Immortality

Uatu (/ˈwɑːtuː/), often simply known as the Watcher, is a fictional character appearing in American comic books published by Marvel Comics. Created by Stan Lee and Jack Kirby, he first appeared in The Fantastic Four #13 (April 1963). He is a member of the Watchers, an extraterrestrial species who in the distant past stationed themselves across space to monitor the activities of other species. Uatu is the Watcher assigned to observe Earth and its Solar System.

The character has been adapted into other media, such as video games, toys, and television. Jeffrey Wright voiced Uatu in the Marvel Cinematic Universe animated series What If...? (2021–2024) on Disney+.

== Publication history ==
The Watcher was created by Jack Kirby. The character first appeared without a name in Fantastic Four #13 (Apr 1963), and periodically reappeared in that title. He then starred in "Tales of the Watcher", a backup feature that ran in Tales of Suspense #49-58 (Jan 1964-Oct 1965), Silver Surfer #1-7 (Aug 1968-Aug 1969) and Marvel Super-Heroes #23 (Nov 1969). His origin was revealed in Tales of Suspense #53 (May 1964), and his name was revealed in Captain Marvel #39 (Jul 1975).

The character has made many cameo appearances across the Marvel Universe since his debut, including Avengers, Uncanny X-Men, Hulk, Silver Surfer, Quasar, and Marvel Point One. He acts as the narrator in Marvel's What If? title.

In the 2014 "Original Sin" storyline, the character is murdered, sparking a hunt for his murderer. The core miniseries of that storyline is written by Jason Aaron and illustrated by Mike Deodato.

== Fictional character biography ==
The Watchers are among the oldest and most advanced beings in the cosmos. Eons ago, they sought to spread their knowledge to benefit the lesser races of the Universe. Their first attempt, on the planet Prosilicus, included sharing nuclear technology. When the Watchers returned to Prosilicus, they found the natives had all but destroyed themselves in a nuclear war. The Watchers blamed themselves for the catastrophe and vowed to never again meddle in the affairs of other races. Instead, they passively observe and record events for those who will come after the universe ends.

Uatu is the Watcher assigned to watch over Earth from his home in the Blue Area of the Moon. He is an altruist and has bent or violated his oath on numerous occasions to aid humanity. He revealed himself to the Fantastic Four when they discovered his home, telling them he would leave the Moon to observe humanity from a more distant area. He proceeded to violate his oath several more times to aid the Fantastic Four. His most notable transgression was in Fantastic Four #48, in which he tried, and failed, to prevent the Silver Surfer from bringing the planet-devourer Galactus to the Earth. For his continuous disregard for the Watchers' mission, Uatu is once placed on trial by the Watchers. He is found guilty, but is released on his own recognizance.

When the Shi'ar seek to prosecute Mister Fantastic for saving Galactus' life, Uatu serves as his lawyer and receives help from Odin, Eternity, and even Galactus himself to explain that Galactus is part of the universe's balance. Uatu is removed from his duty as Watcher of the Earth, but he returns to observe the world of which he has become so fond.

Uatu is present when the Dreaming Celestial awakens, but he turns away, unwilling to watch. After scanning him, the Dreaming Celestial reveals Uatu has broken his pact of non-interference almost 400 times.

=== Original Sin and death ===
The 2014 "Original Sin" storyline reveals that Uatu's father was the Watcher who originally gave nuclear technology to the Prosilicans, and that Uatu's observation of parallel universes is motivated by a desire to find the one world where his father's act of charity was proved to be the right thing to do. In the beginning of the story, Uatu is murdered and his eyes are gouged out, setting off a search by the Avengers and their allies for his killer. Prior to his death, Uatu was attacked and one of his eyes was removed, ending up in the possession of the villain Orb. However, Uatu refused to identify his attacker and share the location of his missing eye due to it risking his oath. As Uatu gathers his power for an apparent attack, Nick Fury kills him and inherits Uatu's power and position.

=== Revival ===
In the aftermath of the "Empyre" storyline, Fury uses his powers to bring the Cotati's weapons to him so that he could learn how a pacifistic race like the Cotati had gained them. Once he begins analyzing them, Fury realizes the weapons were created by the First Race and is overcome with energy as Uatu is brought back to life.

During the "Reckoning War" storyline, Uatu attempts to appeal to the other Watchers for help against the Prosilicans, but they reject his warnings, to the extent that his father forces Uatu to watch what he describes as the "What If" scenario he has never looked at himself; "What If Uatu Had Never Interfered?". In a world where Uatu never alerted the Fantastic Four to the coming of Galactus, Mister Fantastic creates a weapon that destroys Galactus, but ends up destroying the universe as well. Revealing that the Prosilicans' weapons were based on Watcher technology and they were responsible for the devastation of the Great Barrens, Uatu absorbs the power of the Apex, the center of all power and knowledge of the Watchers.

== Powers and abilities ==
As a member of the race of Watchers, Uatu possesses vast psionic abilities which have been further developed through training. These abilities include flight, telepathy, energy-manipulation powers, power-negating force-field projection, illusion casting, the ability to psionically alter his appearance at will, and highly advanced cosmic senses allowing him to be aware of countless events of Earth. His superhumanly complex intelligence enables him to monitor activities throughout Earth's solar system simultaneously. Uatu can convert his body into an unknown form of energy while still retaining his sentience for travel through hyperspace, and then return to his physical form. Bolstered by treatment with "delta-rays", Uatu possesses virtual immortality, although he can die by losing the will to live. He has shown he is able to transport himself and others through time, and in one issue he claims he can send someone to Limbo.

Watchers can augment their strength with cosmic psionic energy if they choose to; however, they tend to minimize their physical activities. The 1985 edition of the Official Handbook of the Marvel Universe compared Uatu's scale of power to that of Galactus, the Stranger, Odin, and Zeus.

Uatu received an extensive education in his youth on his home world. He devotes himself to the study of Earth's solar system and its sentient beings for millions of years. His home on the Blue Area of the Moon contains a large array of weaponry, artifacts, and technology created by various alien races from throughout the universe.

Uatu also studies the Earths of alternate realities. With permission from the Timekeepers, he possesses a portal through which he can observe alternate realities. He has acquired extraordinary knowledge of the history of both the sentient beings on "mainstream" Earth and the numerous alternate Earths.

== Other versions ==
Several alternate universe versions of Uatu have appeared throughout the character's publication history.

- In Earth X, Uatu is portrayed as nihilistic due to his knowledge that Earth contains an unborn Celestial and that the humans inhabiting it are mere "antibodies", a natural line of defense. Uatu was blinded by Black Bolt, furthering his nihilism.
- In the Marvel 2099 reality, Uatu was blinded by his fellow Watchers for his constant breaking of the Watcher's oath and later sacrificed himself to destroy a barrier around Earth.
- In Marvel Apes, Uatu is a gorilla who usually tells stories that entertain him.
- In Marvel Zombies Return, Uatu is beheaded by Giant-Man, but survives as pure energy.
- In Powerless, a series with no superpowered characters, Uatu's counterpart is psychiatrist William Watts.
- In the Ultimate Marvel universe, Uatu is an advanced alien computer resembling a totem.
- In The League of Extraordinary Gentlemen, Volume III: Century (Minions of the Moon, Chapter 3), Uatu makes a brief, background cameo, humorously distracted from his cosmic duty of non-interference by local lunar inhabitants, the lunar Myrmidons led by Maza of the Moon, and their daily exercise drills.

== In other media ==
=== Television ===
The Watcher, voiced by Jeffrey Wright, as he appears in What If...?

- Uatu appears in Fantastic Four (1967), voiced by Paul Frees.
- Uatu appears in "The Incredible Hulk" segment of The Marvel Super Heroes.
- Uatu makes a cameo appearance in the X-Men: The Animated Series episode "The Dark Phoenix Saga (Part 3): The Dark Phoenix".
  - Uatu makes a cameo appearance in the X-Men '97 episode "Remember It".
- Uatu appears in Fantastic Four (1994), voiced by Alan Oppenheimer.
- Uatu appears in Silver Surfer, voiced by Colin Fox.
- Uatu appears in The Super Hero Squad Show, voiced by Dave Boat.
- Uatu appears in the Robot Chicken episode "Tapping a Hero", voiced by Tom Root.
- Uatu appears in Avengers Assemble, voiced by Clancy Brown.
- Uatu appears in the Hulk and the Agents of S.M.A.S.H. episode "The Trouble with Machines", voiced again by Clancy Brown.
- Uatu, simply called the Watcher, appears in TV series set in the Marvel Cinematic Universe (MCU), voiced by Jeffrey Wright.
  - First appearing in the Disney+ series What If...?, this version serves as the series' narrator while observing alternate realities where major events in the MCU occur differently.
  - The Watcher appears in the I Am Groot episode "Groot and the Great Prophecy", voiced again by Wright.
  - The Watcher makes a cameo appearance in the Your Friendly Neighborhood Spider-Man episode "If This Be My Destiny...".
  - The Watcher makes a cameo appearance in the Daredevil: Born Again episode "Gloves Off".
- The Watcher makes cameo appearances in X-Men '97.

=== Video games ===
- Uatu appears in Spider-Man's "What If...?" mode, voiced by an unknown actor.
- Uatu appears in Marvel: Ultimate Alliance, voiced by Phil LaMarr.
- Uatu appears in the opening of Marvel Heroes, voiced by Vic Mignogna.
- Uatu appears in Super Hero Squad Online.
- Uatu serves as the narrator for Marvel Avengers: Battle for Earth, voiced by Steve Blum.
- Uatu appears in Marvel Cosmic Invasion, voiced by Isaac C. Singleton Jr.

=== Miscellaneous ===
- Uatu appears in Planet X, written by Michael Jan Friedman.
- A parody of Uatu appears in PvP, in which he comes to Earth to observe the trial of the lawsuit put forth by Marvel Comics against the creators of City of Heroes and Galactus devouring Earth.

=== Merchandise ===
In 2004, Bowen Designs released a bust sculpture of Uatu sculpted and designed by the Kucharek Brothers.
