= Franklin Storm =

Fictional character from Marvel Comics

Publication information
- Publisher: Marvel Comics
- First appearance: Fantastic Four #31 (Oct. 1964)
- Created by: Stan Lee (writer); Jack Kirby (artist)

In-story information
- Species: Human
- Abilities: Gifted surgeon

Franklin Storm is a character appearing in American comic books published by Marvel Comics. He is the father of Susan Storm and Johnny Storm, better known as Invisible Woman and Human Torch of the Fantastic Four, respectively.

Reg E. Cathey portrays Franklin Storm in Fantastic Four (2015).

== Publication history ==
Franklin Storm first appeared in Fantastic Four #31 (October 1964), and was created by Stan Lee and Jack Kirby.

== Fictional character biography ==
Dr. Franklin Storm, the father of Susan and Johnny Storm, was an accomplished surgeon. While driving with his wife Mary to a dinner being held in his honor, one of the tires in his car blew out, and the car swerved off the road and crashed, severely injuring Mary. Storm unsuccessfully operated on Mary in a desperate attempt to save her life, but the injuries proved fatal. He blamed himself for her death. Leaving his career, he turned to gambling, eventually borrowing money from a loan shark. When Storm was unable to pay, one of the loan shark's men threatened Storm and his children. Storm grappled with the man, and during the ensuing fight, the man accidentally shot and killed himself. Storm was sentenced to prison for 20 years for manslaughter. Upon his request, Susan did not visit him while in prison and told Johnny that he was dead.

Years later, Susan and Johnny gain superhuman powers and become members of the Fantastic Four. Franklin Storm escapes from prison early in the Fantastic Four's career. When he learns that Susan had been seriously injured while escaping from the Mole Man's lair, he comes out of hiding and operates on her, saving her life. After the operation, Storm is returned to prison.

Shortly thereafter, Storm is captured by Skrulls and impersonated by the Super-Skrull. Disguised as Storm and claiming to have acquired superhuman powers, the Super-Skrull breaks out of prison and confronts the Fantastic Four. Reed Richards recognizes the impostor and forces the Skrulls to exchange their agent for Storm.

Under the advice of the warlord Morrat, the Skrulls attach a concussive energy beam projector to Storm's chest to attack the Fantastic Four. He warns the heroes to stay away and rolls over on the floor, sacrificing himself by taking the force of the blast. Susan names her son Franklin after her father in honor of his memory.

== Other versions ==
=== Secret Wars ===
An alternate universe version of Franklin Storm appears in Secret Wars. This version is the leader of the Fantastic Four.

=== Ultimate Marvel ===
An alternate universe version of Franklin Storm appears in the Ultimate Marvel universe. This version is a scientist who worked on recreating the Super-Soldier Serum and helped build the Baxter Building. During the Ultimatum storyline, Storm is killed when Magneto floods Manhattan.

=== Ultimate Universe ===
An alternate universe version of Franklin Richards appears in Ultimate Invasion. This version is the director of a space program who contributed to the Fantastic Four's space flight. Due to the Maker's interference, all except Reed Richards are killed.

== In other media ==
=== Television ===
Franklin Storm appears in the Fantastic Four (1994) episode "Behold, A Distant Star", voiced by Richard McGonagle.

=== Film ===
Franklin Storm appears in Fantastic Four (2015), portrayed by Reg E. Cathey. This version is African-American and the director of the Baxter Foundation, with Johnny being his biological son while Susan is adopted. After the formation of the Fantastic Four, Franklin works with the government to help them control and understand their powers before being killed by Doctor Doom.
