= Super-Skrull =

Fictional character in Marvel Comics

- Super-Skrull (Kl'rt) as seen on the variant cover of Empyre #3 (July 2020). Art by Tony Daniel.

Publication information
- Publisher: Marvel Comics
- First appearance: Fantastic Four #18 (September 1963)
- Created by: Stan Lee (writer); Jack Kirby (artist)

In-story information
- Full name: Kl'rt
- Species: Enhanced Skrull
- Place of origin: Tarnax IV
- Team affiliations: Secret Defenders; United Front
- Notable aliases: Invincible Man; Dr. Franklin Storm; Thing; Captain Hero; Bobby Wright; Dorrek VIII
- Abilities: Shapeshifting; Superhuman strength, stamina and durability; Elasticity; Skilled hand-to-hand combatant; Pyrokinesis; Fiery form that enables flight; Heat energy absorption; Invisibility; Force field generation

The Super-Skrull is an alias used by characters appearing in American comic books published by Marvel Comics. The original and most well-known incarnation, Kl'rt, created by Stan Lee and Jack Kirby, first appeared in Fantastic Four #18 (September 1963), and has been depicted as both a supervillain and an antihero. The character has also appeared on television and in video games and novels.

== Publication history ==
Kl'rt was created by Stan Lee and Jack Kirby, and first appeared in Fantastic Four #18 (September 1963). He was the original and well-known Super-Skrull, an enemy of the Fantastic Four and has been depicted as both a supervillain and an antihero.

S'byll was created by Steve Englehart and Joe Staton, and first appeared in Silver Surfer (vol. 3) #13 (April 1988). She was the second Super-Skrull.

== Fictional character biography ==
=== Kl'rt ===
Kl'rt the Super-Skrull is from the Skrull world of Tarnax IV, before it was destroyed by Galactus. He was a decorated soldier in the army and married a Skrull countess from the planet Zaragz'na and had two children: his beloved son Sarnogg and a daughter named Jazinda whom he despised. Because of his duty, he was kept away from his family. Following a series of defeats, Kl'rt was banished from Zaragz'na and not allowed to see Sarnogg.

Skrull emperor Dorrek VII devises a way to strike back against the Fantastic Four, who thwarted the Skrull empire's invasion of Earth. Dorrek chooses Kl'rt to be given the combined abilities of the Fantastic Four, surpassing all four in terms of power. Super-Skrull retains his shapeshifting and hypnotic abilities, and is sent to Earth to defeat the Fantastic Four and pave the way for a new Skrull invasion.

During their first encounter, the Super-Skrull keeps the Fantastic Four at bay and forces them to retreat. Mister Fantastic senses that Kl'rt's powers are augmented by an energy beam from the Skrull homeworld. Blocking the beam with a device placed on him by the Invisible Girl deprives Kl'rt of his new powers. Defeated, he is imprisoned in a crater by the Human Torch when he pursues the Invisible Girl.

The Super-Skrull returns as the Invincible Man after the Skrulls restore his powers to fight the Fantastic Four. He breaks out of his prison, travels to New York and kidnaps Franklin Storm. The Fantastic Four recognize his deception and return him in exchange for Storm. Storm is killed by a bomb placed on him by the Skrull warlord Morrat in a final attempt to kill the Fantastic Four. The Super-Skrull is among the villains summoned by Doctor Doom to attack Reed Richards and Sue Storm at their wedding, but Reed used a machine to remove the villain's memories.

Super-Skrull is the Empire's agent on Earth during the Kree–Skrull War; he temporarily disbands the Avengers and kidnaps Captain Marvel, the Scarlet Witch and Quicksilver. With the war ending in a truce, the disgraced Super-Skrull sides with Thanos, aiding him in his quest to obtain the Cosmic Cube. The Super-Skrull attempts to capture Rick Jones for Thanos, but is thwarted by Captain Marvel. After a skirmish with Spider-Man, the Human Torch and Ms. Marvel, Kl'rt is trapped in the Van Allen radiation belt.

A Canadian research team accidentally pulls Kl'rt back from deep space, after which he kills all of them except for Sasquatch. Kl'rt discovers that the radiation belt has given him cancer. Sasquatch is initially defeated by the Super-Skrull but tricks him, converting him into a stream of dissociated particles and sending him back into deep space. The Super-Skrull, later freed by the Silver Surfer, discovers that his cancer is in remission, apparently due to a temporal anomaly that reverted his cellular makeup to its pre-cancerous state.

Kl'rt is freed from the Van Allen belt and cured of cancer by the sorcerer Master Khan, and used against Iron Fist. Khan brainwashes the Super-Skrull into believing that he is Bobby Wright, a twelve-year-old boy who acquires superhuman powers and a terminal disease from exposure to an alien spore. "Bobby" uses his powers to assume the identity of adult superhuman Captain Hero and ingratiate himself with Iron Fist and Power Man. Captain Hero's misuse of powers leaves Iron Fist apparently dead and triggers disintegration.

The Super-Skrull's imprisonment shields him from the effects of Zabyk's Disaster, which causes the Skrulls to lose their shapeshifting abilities. When the Skrull empire falls into disarray, Kl'rt goes into hiding on Earth and later attacks the Fantastic Four. He escapes his imprisonment and resumes contact with the Skrull empire. Super-Skrull later captures Teddy Altman, informing him that he is a Skrull-Kree hybrid. Teddy chooses to remain on Earth, refusing to join either species in space. Super-Skrull poses as Teddy and returns to space to spy on the Skrulls and the Kree.

During the Annihilation War, Kl'rt tries to stop the destructive wave before it reaches the Skrull world, where his son is. After nearly being overwhelmed by the forces of Annihilus, he sacrifices himself by destroying the warship Harvester of Sorrow, but is unable to save his son. Kl'rt meets Praxagora, a Negative Zone android who becomes his lover. His body is later recovered and revived.

During the "Infinity" storyline, the Super-Skrull appears as a member of the Galactic Council. To repay the Avengers' efforts in the war and attain glory, Kl'rt accompanies Alliance forces to Earth to free it from occupation by Thanos and they liberate the Peak. After his victory in the war against the Builders, Kl'rt is crowned emperor of the reborn Skrull empire as the Skrulls settle on the planet Tarnax II.

=== S'byll ===
S'byll is a Skrull who was raised on the planet Satriani. She was responsible for curing Kl'rt's disease. Some of the Silver Surfer's Power Cosmic helps S'Byll restore the Skrulls' shapeshifting abilities as she temporarily wielded a portion of the Power Cosmic. Because of this, she was later sworn in a Skrull Empress.

== Powers and abilities ==
Kl'rt can shapeshift like all Skrulls, and possesses all the powers of the Fantastic Four. He also possesses mind control via eye contact, is an accomplished combatant, a competent starship pilot, talented impersonator, and highly trained in the martial applications of his powers.

== Other versions ==
=== Earth-6309 ===
In this reality, Kl'rt is the Skrull lord of Colony UK7 and a Captain Britain Corps member.

=== Heroes Reborn ===
An alternate universe version of Kl'rt / Super-Skrull appears in "Heroes Reborn".

=== Marvel Zombies ===
Several Super-Skrulls appear in the Marvel Zombies series. The first version was infected by the zombified Spider-Man before being killed by a zombified Thing. Another zombified version of Super-Skrull appears in Marvel Zombies Return, where he is killed by Iron Man.

=== Professor W's X-Men ===
In this two-issue limited series, the Super-Skrull has been killed by Rogue and his powers have been stolen. His abilities, superpowers and darker personality traits remain in Rogue, who goes on to join the Brotherhood of Mutants.

=== Ultimate Marvel ===
The Ultimate Marvel version of Kl'rt is the Skrull emperor and oldest living Skrull. His suit allows him to duplicate the powers of any superhuman in a thousand-mile radius.

=== Marvel Mangaverse ===
An original incarnation of the Super-Skrull named Kreega appears in Marvel Mangaverse.

=== Squadron Supreme ===
The Skrullian Skymaster, also known as Skymax, is a member of the Squadron Supreme who possesses the same powers as Kl'rt.

=== Venomized ===
A "Poison Super-Skrull" appears in Venomized #5.

== In other media ==
=== Television ===
- The Kl'rt incarnation of the Super-Skrull appears in The Marvel Super Heroes, voiced by Tom Harvey.
- The Kl'rt incarnation of the Super-Skrull appears in the Fantastic Four (1967) episode "Invasion of the Super-Skrull", voiced by Marvin Miller.
- The Kl'rt incarnation of the Super-Skrull appears in Fantastic Four (1994), voiced initially by Neil Ross and later by Jess Harnell.
- The Kl'rt incarnation of the Super-Skrull appears in Fantastic Four: World's Greatest Heroes, voiced by Mark Oliver.
- The Kl'rt incarnation of the Super-Skrull appears in The Super Hero Squad Show, voiced by Charlie Adler in the first season, and by Jim Cummings in the second season.
- The Kl'rt incarnation of the Super-Skrull appears in The Avengers: Earth's Mightiest Heroes, voiced by Kyle Hebert.
- The Kl'rt incarnation of the Super-Skrull appears in Hulk and the Agents of S.M.A.S.H., voiced by Kevin Grevioux.
- The Super-Skrulls appear in Secret Invasion, with Gravik (portrayed by Kingsley Ben-Adir) and G'iah (portrayed by Emilia Clarke) appearing prominently. These versions were empowered by genetic samples from Groot, a Frost Beast, Cull Obsidian, an Extremis patient, and the participants of the Battle of Earth. (Note: As depicted in Avengers: Endgame (2019).) Additionally, a genderbent version of Kreega (portrayed by Irmena Chichikova) appears as a member of Gravik's Skrull resistance.

=== Video games ===
- The Kl'rt incarnation of the Super-Skrull appears in Fantastic Four (1997).
- The Kl'rt incarnation of the Super-Skrull appear as a mini-boss in Marvel: Ultimate Alliance, voiced by Greg Eagles.
- The Kl'rt incarnation of the Super-Skrull appears as a boss in Fantastic Four: Rise of the Silver Surfer, voiced by Joey Camen.
- The Kl'rt incarnation of the Super-Skrull appears as a playable character in Marvel vs. Capcom 3: Fate of Two Worlds, voiced again by Charlie Adler.
- The Kl'rt incarnation of the Super-Skrull appears in Marvel Super Hero Squad: The Infinity Gauntlet, voiced again by Jim Cummings.
- The Kl'rt incarnation of the Super-Skrull appears in Marvel Super Hero Squad Online.
- The Kl'rt incarnation of the Super-Skrull appears as a playable character in Marvel Avengers: Battle for Earth, voiced by Troy Baker.
- The Kl'rt incarnation of the Super-Skrull appears in Lego Marvel Super Heroes, voiced by John DiMaggio.
- The Kl'rt incarnation of the Super-Skrull appears as a boss in Marvel Heroes, voiced again by Charlie Adler.
- The Kl'rt incarnation of the Super-Skrull appears as a playable character in Marvel Puzzle Quest.

=== Miscellaneous ===
- The Kl'rt incarnation of the Super-Skrull appears in the Ultimate Super-Villains: New Stories Featuring Marvel's Deadliest Villains line of novels by Stan Lee.
- The Kl'rt incarnation of the Super-Skrull appears in Spider-Woman: Agent of S.W.O.R.D., voiced by Jesse Falcon.
- The Kl'rt incarnation of the Super-Skrull appears in the Marvel vs. Capcom 3: Fate of Two Worlds tie-in prequel comic as a member of the Cabal.
- The Kl'rt incarnation of the Super-Skrull appears in the X-Men / Avengers novel trilogy Gamma Quest.

=== Merchandise ===
- The Kl'rt incarnation of the Super-Skrull received figures in the HeroClix "Clobbern Time", "Supernova", and "Galactic Guardians" sets.
- The Kl'rt incarnation of the Super-Skrull received a "Build-A-Figure" in the Marvel Legends line.
