= Shamrock (comics) =

Publication information
- Publisher: Marvel Comics
- First appearance: Marvel Super Hero Contest of Champions #1 (Jun 1982)
- Created by: Mark Gruenwald, Bill Mantlo, Steven Grant, and John Romita Jr.

In-story information
- Alter ego: Molly Fitzgerald
- Species: Human mutate
- Team affiliations: S.H.I.E.L.D.
- Abilities: Probability Manipulation; Skilled hand-to-hand combatant

Shamrock is a comic book superhero appearing in American comic books published by Marvel Comics. Created by Mark Gruenwald, Bill Mantlo, Steven Grant, and John Romita Jr., the character first appeared in the comic book Marvel Super-Heroes: Contest of Champions #1 (June 1982).

== Publication history ==
Shamrock first appeared in Marvel Super-Heroes: Contest of Champions #1 (June 1982). She also appeared in issues #2-3 of the series (July–August 1982).

The character subsequently appeared in The Incredible Hulk Vol. 2 #279 (January 1983), Rom #65 (April 1985), Marvel Comics Presents #24 (July 1989), Alpha Flight #108 (May 1992), Guardians of the Galaxy Annual #3 (1993), Guardians of the Galaxy Annual #4 (1994), Excalibur #108 (April 1997), and Marvel Monsters: From the Files of Ulysses Bloodstone and the Monster Hunters (November 2005).

Shamrock received an entry in the original Official Handbook of the Marvel Universe #9, and in the All-New Official Handbook of the Marvel Universe A-Z #9 (2006).

Following a thirteen-year absence from comics, Shamrock returned to the Marvel Universe in a short story published in Girl Comics #2 (2010), where she is depicted as having become overweight during her retirement. The story is written by Kathryn Immonen and illustrated by Colleen Coover. In 2013 she appeared in Fearless Defenders #9.

== Fictional character biography ==
Molly Fitzgerald was born in Dunshaughlin, Ireland, and her father was a militant member of the IRA. As Shamrock, she functions as a vessel for displaced poltergeists and the souls of innocent people that died during war; these spirits manifest themselves for fractions of seconds to give good luck to herself and bad luck for those who oppose her.

She was chosen by the Grandmaster who teleported her away along with numerous other heroes from Earth, to allow the Grandmaster and Death to select champions from them to represent either side. Shamrock was chosen for Death's team, fighting alongside fellow heroes Peregrine, Iron Man, Vanguard, Iron Fist, Storm, Arabian Knight, Sabra, Invisible Woman, Angel, Black Panther, Sunfire, and the Collective Man. When the Grandmaster's team won the contest, the heroes were returned to Earth.

Later, her father drugged her to allow Arnim Zola to attempt to duplicate her powers. She later retired from superhero activity and became a hairdresser. She eventually moved to New York City, where she opened a bar. She was later revealed to have become a S.H.I.E.L.D. agent at some point.

She is later seen running a superhero salon.

== Powers and abilities ==
Shamrock is possessed by the souls of thousands of victims of wars who manifest themselves as poltergeists which affect probability within a 20-foot radius of her, altering situations so that she is given an advantage, in essence having "The Luck of the Irish."

== Reception ==
=== Critical reception ===
Jack Beresford of The Irish Post stated, "Though far from a fan favourite, Shamrock remains a character of huge potential. [...] Far from a popular presence in the world of Marvel comics, should the MCU succeed in resurrecting this decidedly one-dimensional Irish superhero stereotype, then it could rank among their greatest achievements." Nicholas Conley of Grunge.com asserted, "Now, one aspect of Shamrock's origins that is potentially interesting is that her body has supposedly become a vessel for the many souls of innocent lives lost during war, a concept that could be fleshed out. However, the stereotypical nature of everything else about Shamrock is really hard to overlook, so it's not surprising that the character has sunken into deep obscurity." Eric Nierstedt of ComicsVerse wrote, "Molly Fitzgerald is authentically Irish (born in Dunshaughlin), and has a unique power. The souls of war victims surround her body and manipulate probability in her favor. Unfortunately, she has the stereotypical Irish look of green eyes and long red hair and dresses in a green costume that forcibly tells people she's Irish. Also, her abilities basically mean that her superpower is being lucky. At that point, readers are waiting to hear how she gets her powers from drinking a mixture of Guinness and Lucky Charms. So while Shamrock might be an Irish superhero, she's sadly defined by that and that alone." Matthew Wood of CBR.com said, "A red-haired woman who dresses like a shamrock-themed billiard ball, Molly Fitzgerald's usually seen as the most stereotypically Irish hero imaginable. Her power set doesn't disabuse anyone of this notion, since she has "the luck of the Irish" to help her win fights."

=== Accolades ===
- In 2017, CBR.com ranked Shamrock 10th in their "15 Irish Superheroes And Villains" list and 11th in their "15 Superheroes Marvel Wants You To Forget" list.
- In 2017, Screen Rant included Shamrock in their " "15 Superheroes Marvel Wants You To Forget" list.
- In 2019, CBR.com ranked Shamrock 10th in their "10 Bad Superpowers (That Are Secretly Amazing)" list.
- In 2020, Scary Mommy included Shamrock in their "Looking For A Role Model? These 195+ Marvel Female Characters Are Truly Heroic" list.
- In 2020, CBR.com ranked Shamrock 6th in their "Marvel's 10 Best Heroes Who Use Luck To Their Advantage" list and 6th in their "10 Heroes Marvel Completely Forgot Existed" list.

== Other versions ==
In the Marvel Zombies universe, she became infected with the zombie virus and traveled the world in search of uninfected humans, which had become all but extinct. She encountered Earth-616 (Marvel's core universe)'s Deadpool, who was traveling with two A.I.M. scientists and a zombie-head Deadpool. Tigra assisted Shamrock in trying to eat the humans but was destroyed by the scientists. Shamrock boasted that her luck powers would allow her to prevail in a fight against him until Deadpool began conversing with her about how hard it must be living with her insatiable hunger, but having nothing to eat. He then pulled her around to the idea that sometimes death might be preferable to such an existence to which she agonizingly agreed. In having admitted that, her own power worked against her, increasing her luck that she could be killed which Deadpool was happy to help her accomplish, cutting her in half, lengthwise with a katana.

In an alternate future seen in Guardians of the Galaxy Annual #3 in 1993, Shamrock becomes one of the many powers involved in the Ireland-based resistance against the invading Martians. She works closely with Doctor Druid; part of her duties is to guard the Book of Kells, which had the Martian battle added to it. Her adventures allow her to live long into what is to her, the future.
