= FOOM =

1970s American comics fan magazine

- FOOM #16 (Dec. 1976), with wraparound cover depicting the Marvel office layout at the time.
- Editor: Jim Steranko (issues #1-4); Tony Isabella (issues #5–7); Scott Edelman (issues #8–11); Duffy Vohland (issue #12); Chris Claremont (issues #13–14); David Anthony Kraft (issue #15)
- Categories: Marvel Comics news and publicity
- Frequency: quarterly
- Publisher: Marvel Comics
- First issue: Feb. 1973
- Country: United States
- Language: English

FOOM was Marvel Comics' self-produced fan magazine of the mid-1970s, following the canceled Marvelmania and preceding Marvel Age. Running 22 quarterly issues (February 1973 – Fall 1978), it was initially designed and edited by comic book writer-artist Jim Steranko.

FOOM, though spelled without periods in both indicia and cover treatments, is an acronym for "Friends of Ol' Marvel".

It was relaunched in September 2017.

== Publication history ==
Steranko, in his first-issue introduction, wrote that he had "dropped in at the Marvel bullpen to rap with publisher, Stan Lee about the current comic scene" and that Lee told him about plans to start an in-house fan club. EC Comics had had its "EC Fan-Addict" club in the 1950s, and Marvel the Merry Marvel Marching Society beginning in 1964. After the MMMS had run its course by 1969, Marvel licensed a small company in Culver City, California, to produce the fanzine/product catalog Marvelmania, which lasted a year. Steranko, writing that he nostalgically "recalled the days of radio with all the clubs and super-premiums that were perpetually offered over the air", volunteered as a designer, writer and comic historian. Ken Bruzenak served as associate editor, with Marvel editor-in-chief Roy Thomas as consulting editor and Ed Noonchester, Joel Thingvall, and Gary Brown as staff.

A four-issue subscription cost US$3. An additional dollar bought a club membership I.D. card, six decals, and a poster. The membership kit was also available separately for US$2.50.

The premiere contained a foreword by Lee (on cover = p. 1); an introduction by Steranko (pp. 2/3) announcing a contest to design a superhero or supervillain; short biographies (pp. 4/5) of Lee, Thomas, artists John Buscema and Joe Sinnott, and writer Gerry Conway; a crossword puzzle (pp. 6/7); a four-page feature (pp. 8–11) on the superhero team the Fantastic Four, accompanied by a two-page title and credits checklist (pp. 12/13); a word-search game (p. 14); an in-house ad for the record album The Amazing Spider-Man: A Rockomic! (p. 15); a two-page board game, "Moving Target" (pp. 16/17); a six-page "Far-Out Fanfare and Infoomation!" section (pp. 18–23) previewing upcoming Marvel comics; a pinup (p. 24) reprinting superheroes from the Jack Kirby-drawn cover of Fantastic Four #73 (April 1968); a Dr Doom decoder puzzle (p. 25); a one-page "Recommended Reading" page that featured The Steranko History of Comics' and Steranko's Comixscene for two-thirds of the page; a page of sketches of superspy Nick Fury (p. 27), on which fans were encouraged to draw disguises; an in-house ad for b&w mag, "Tales of the Zombie" (p. 28); a one-page humor strip (p. 29), "Fantastic Fear", written by Thomas and Len Brown and drawn by Gil Kane and Wally Wood; an in-house ad for T-shirts (p. 30); puzzle solutions and in-house coupons (p. 31); back cover (p. 32) [a mailing address label/pin-up page]. Similar fare appeared in subsequent issues.

FOOM #7 (Fall 1974): Back cover art by Mike Ploog.

Steranko, who additionally drew the back cover of issue #1 (Spider-Man), the cover of #2 (the Hulk), and incidental interior art during his tenure, was succeeded as editor by Tony Isabella with issue #5 (Spring 1974). Ed Hannigan was by now credited for production, with Mark Evanier, Jim Salicrup, and Duffy Vohland as contributing editors. Scott Edelman took over as editor with #8 (Winter 1974), Vohland with #12 (Dec. 1975), Chris Claremont with #13 (March 1976), and finally Dave Kraft with #15 (Sept. 1976). While previous issues had listed the company's overall editor-in-chief on the masthead, FOOM, also with issue #15, was given its own editor-in-chief, beginning with Ralph Macchio, followed two issues later by Salicrup.

The back cover of #7 (Fall 1974) featured one of Ghost Rider co-creator Mike Ploog's earliest sketches of that supernatural motorcyclist, introduced two years earlier. Issue #11 (Sept. 1975) was a Jack Kirby tribute commemorating the legendary comic-book artist's prodigal return to Marvel after a four-year sojourn at rival DC Comics.

John Byrne's earliest work at Marvel, a Frankenstein drawing inked by Duffy Vohland, appeared in issue #5's "Fan Art Gallery".

Issue # 10 has been debated as possibly the first appearance of the New X-Men, depicted on the cover and in an article, in 1975.

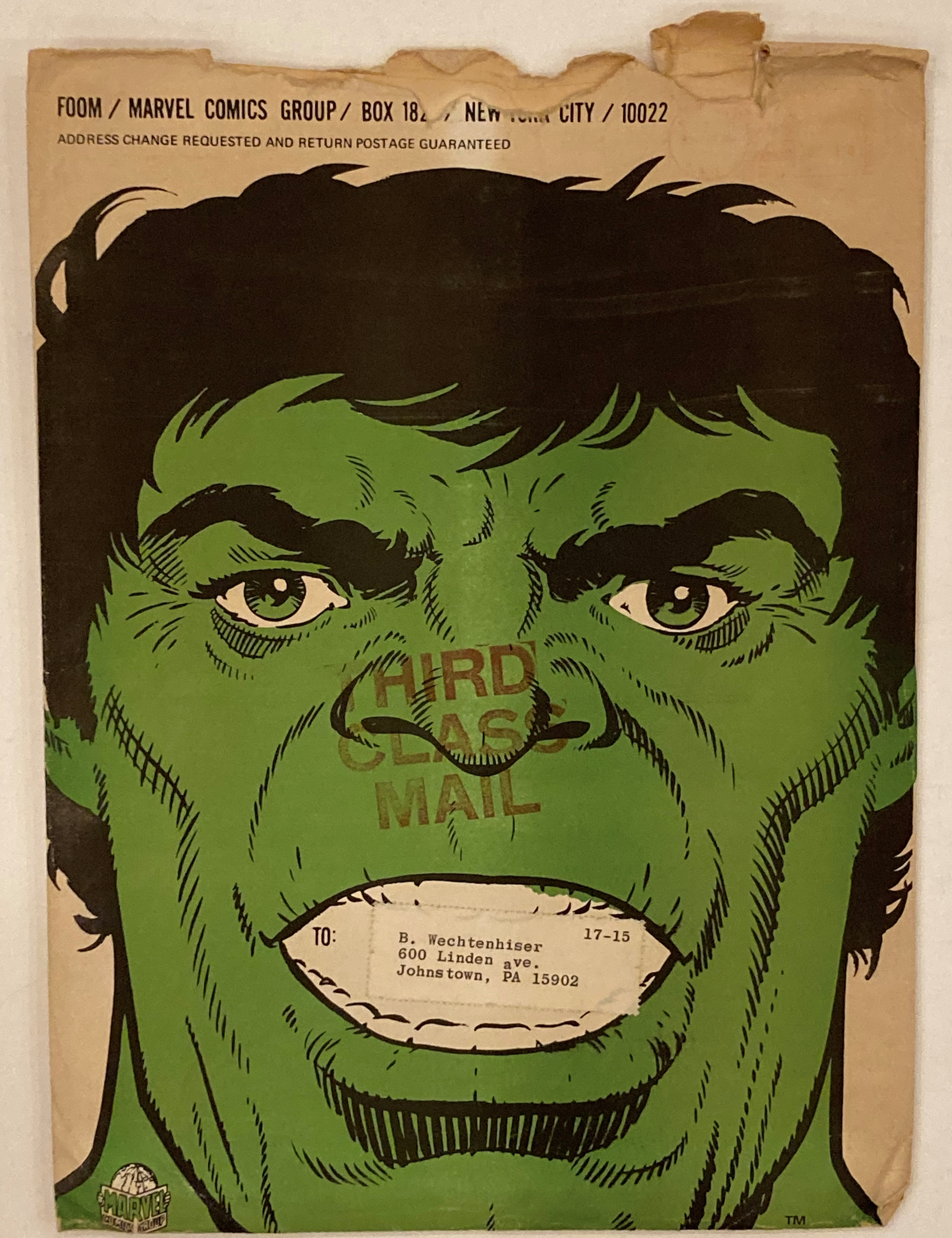
Bruce Wechtenhiser's FOOM membership kit arrived in this colorful Hulk envelope in 1973.

It was relaunched in September 2017.

== Character contest ==
Contest-winning character

Issue #2 (Summer 1973) presented the first of two double-page spreads of fan art submitted for the character-design contest announced in issue #1. Included were the characters "Absorba-Man" by future comics artist Steve Rude, "Novaton" by future Marvel art director, writer and editor Mariano Nicieza and Borgo by Kazimieras G. Prapuolenis. A prescient character entry was "The Wolverine" by Andy Olsen, although the character he drew and described was dissimilar from the popular Wolverine character that first appeared a year later in the pages of The Incredible Hulk #180.

Issue #3 (Fall 1973) included "Heros" by future Marvel Age editor Steve Saffel. The winner, announced that issue, was Michael A. Barreiro of Pittsburgh, Pennsylvania, for the supervillain "Humus Sapiens". Several dozen honorable mentions included future The X-Files comic-book writer Stefan Petrucha, listed among those under "Best Presentation", and Doug Hazlewood submitting a drawing of a character named Deathwatch, which also later became a dissimilar Marvel character.

Despite the contest's announced prize, Humus Sapiens was never used in a Marvel comic at the time. Creator Barreiro later inquired at Marvel about the character, but received no response. Comics columnist Fred Hembeck in 1979 wrote in the magazine Buyer's Guide to Comic Fandom about the contest and Humus Sapiens, but nothing came of it. The character eventually appeared 28 years later in Thunderbolts #54-55 (Sept.-Oct. 2001), as the fictional mutant Humus Sapien. Barreiro grew up to become a carpenter and a freelance artist living in the Carrick neighborhood, and did a small amount of work for Marvel and Dark Horse Comics.

== See also ==
- The Amazing World of DC Comics
- Marvel Age
- Pizzazz
