= Merry Marvel Marching Society =

Fan club for Marvel Comics

- Founded: 1964
- Founder: Stan Lee, Martin Goodman
- Dissolved: 1969; absorbed in Marvelmania International
- Type: Fanclub
- Purpose: To promote the appreciation of Marvel Comics
- Location: New York City
- Region served: Marvel Comics readers
- Owner: Marvel Comics
- Key people: Flo Steinberg

Merry Marvel Marching Society (often referred to by the abbreviation "M.M.M.S.") was a fan club for Marvel Comics started by editor Stan Lee and publisher Martin Goodman in 1964.

== History ==
Following teaser promotion in Marvel comic books cover-dated November 1964, Marvel Comics introduced the company's in-house fan club, the Merry Marvel Marching Society, in its comics cover-dated January 1965, released in the fall 1964. Generally abbreviated as the "M.M.M.S", the club offered readers a $1 membership kit that initially included a welcoming letter, a membership card, a "Voices of Marvel" record, a scratch pad, a sticker, a pinback button, and a certificate.

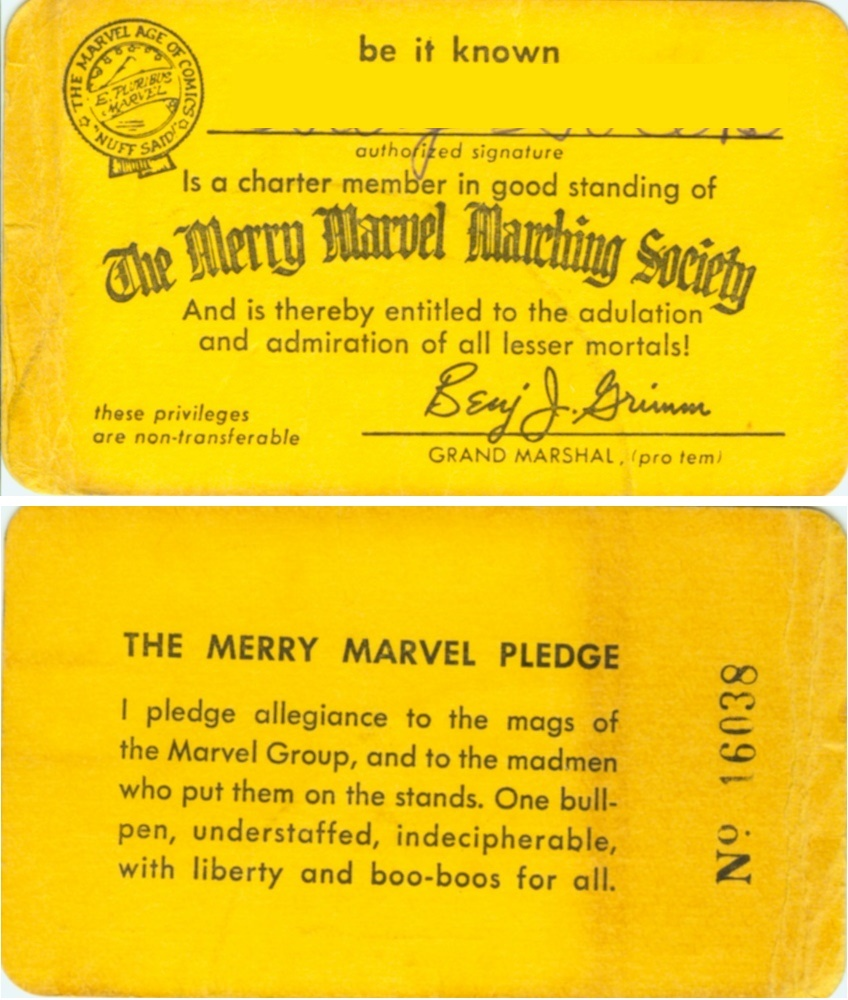
Merry Marvel Marching Society membership card

The company offered permutations of this kit, plus additional promotional merchandise such as posters and sweatshirts, through comics cover-dated October 1969. As author Marc Flores, who writes under the pen name Ronin Ro, described,

Stan made up cards and had production people Sol Brodsky and Marie Severin help create a pin, eight stickers prominently featuring the heroes, "a nutty new notepad," a minibook, a pencil, a certificate, and a membership card. Stan wanted his bullpen to join him in a special recording he'd include in the $1 membership kit. Most of the bullpen was willing, except for [Steve] Ditko.

The club proved successful, with Marvel secretary and club coordinator Flo Steinberg remarking that they "were working seven days a week just opening these envelopes" containing the subscription fee. In a 2002 interview, Steinberg said,

"Bags and bags of mail would come in and we would open them up, and — this was before computers — we had to write down everybody's name and make labels for each one, and pull out all these hundreds of dollar bills. We were throwing them at each other there were so many!"

A "Merry Marvel Marching Society" song played as a promotional tie-in over the closing credits of the 1966 animated series The Marvel Super Heroes.

By the end of 1965, Marvel reported that 40,000 members had joined the club. This estimate increased to 50,000 in 1966, and 70,000 by 1967.

Soon, the club offered a range of other products, including a Spider-Man pin-up, a Jack Kirby stationery drawing of the Thing, and T-shirts featuring Doctor Strange and the Fantastic Four, respectively drawn by Steve Ditko and Kirby.

The M.M.M.S. membership had ranks indicated by three-letter abbreviations (such as Q.N.S. for "Quite 'Nuff Sayer" and F.F.F. for "Fearless Front-Facer"), based on a proposal by young fan Mark Evanier.

The M.M.M.S. was absorbed into the subsequent Marvel fan club, Marvelmania International, in 1969. This second club lasted until 1971. A third official Marvel Comics fan club, FOOM (Friends of Ol' Marvel) followed from 1973 to 1976.
