= Humus Sapien =

Marvel Comics supervillain

- The character as he appeared in FOOM #3.

Publication information
- Publisher: Marvel Comics
- First appearance: FOOM #3 (Autumn 1973); Thunderbolts #54 (Sept. 2001)
- Created by: Michael A Barreiro; Fabian Nicieza (writer); Patrick Zircher (artist)

In-story information
- Alter ego: Sonny Baredo
- Species: Human Mutant
- Team affiliations: Thunderbolts
- Notable aliases: Humus Sapiens
- Abilities: Ability to destroy all non-natural substances

Humus Sapien (Sonny Baredo) is a supervillain appearing in American comic books published by Marvel Comics. He first appeared as Humus Sapiens in FOOM #3 (Autumn 1973), created by Michael A. Barreiro. He first appeared as Humus Sapien in Thunderbolts #54 (Sept. 2001), by the writer-artist team of Fabian Nicieza and Patrick Zircher.

== Publication history ==
=== FOOM ===
Humus Sapien first appeared in Marvel's self-produced fan magazine, FOOM # 3 (Fall 1973), created (as supervillain Humus Sapiens) by Michael A. Barreiro of Penn Hills, Pennsylvania, and was the winning entry in the magazine's character-creation contest. Although FOOM founding editor Jim Steranko wrote in the premiere-issue introduction that "(t)he winning entry (to be selected by Ol' Smilin' Stan [Lee] himself) will become a super guest-star featured in one of Marvel's top hero mags!", this never occurred, and both the character and the contest faded into obscurity.

Later, Barreiro inquired about the character but received no response from Marvel. In 1979, Buyer's Guide to Comic Fandom columnist, Fred Hembeck, wrote about the character and contest and, though nothing immediately came of it, the column eventually prompted Tom Brevoort, editor of Marvel's Thunderbolts, to call Barreiro two decades later with an offer to use the character.

=== Thunderbolts ===
In 1998, writer Kurt Busiek and editor Tom Brevoort decided to use Barreiro's character in the superhero series, Thunderbolts. Fabian Nicieza, who succeeded Busiek as Thunderbolts writer (and had also entered the FOOM contest), agreed. Renamed Humus Sapien, the character finally debuted, after 28 years, in Thunderbolts #54 (cover-dated Sept. 2001). Barreiro was allowed to ink one page of the issue featuring the character.

== Fictional character biography ==
Humus Sapien fought the Redeemers when he emerged from a suspended animation chamber where he had been imprisoned by Ogre and Factor Three. He has vaguely defined superhuman abilities powered by Earth's population; however, each time he uses his powers, random people around the world die. Humus Sapien's final battle, after which he voluntarily leaves Earth, drains the lives of 2,400 random people across the globe, including the Middle Eastern superhero, the Arabian Knight.
