= Marvelmania International =

First Marvelmania Club Catalog, cover art by Jack Kirby.

Marvelmania International was comic-book publisher Marvel Comics' authorized but independently operated fan club from 1969 to 1971, which absorbed the Merry Marvel Marching Society begun in 1964. It included a six-issue fan magazine, Marvelmania Magazine.

== History ==
=== Creation ===
Following teaser promotion in Marvel comic books cover-dated November 1964, Marvel Comics introduced the company's in-house fan club, the Merry Marvel Marching Society, in its February 1965 comics, released in the fall of 1964. Generally abbreviated "M.M.M.S", the club offered readers a $1 membership kit that initially included a welcoming letter; a membership card; a one-sided, 33⅓ rpm record, "The Voices of Marvel"; a scratch pad; a sticker; a pinback button; and a certificate. The company offered permutations of this kit, plus additional promotional merchandise such as posters and sweatshirts, through comics cover-dated October 1969.

In those same October 1969 issues, Marvel announced in its promotional Bullpen Bulletins page that it had contracted with an unnamed "California executive" to create a new fan club, and that "the M.M.M.S. will be incorporated into a fabulous parent organization named Marvelmania International". The new company, the announcement continued, would be independent of Marvel. Marvel publisher Martin Goodman had felt that the M.M.M.S. was too expensive to maintain, despite Marvel editor Stan Lee arguing that the club was good public relations. Goodman's son, Chip Goodman, told Lee an executive from California would pay $10,000 to license every Marvel character and produce related merchandise, although Marvelmania employee Steve Sherman recalled in the early 2000s that he believed only $5,000 was ever paid.

The first of three Marvelmania membership kits was advertised in November and December 1969 comics, such as Fantastic Four #92-93. Marvelmania operated out of P.O. Box 718, Culver City, California 90230.

According to a biography in Marvelmania #1 (April 1970), company founder Don Wallace was born in Cleveland, Ohio, on July 27, 1940, with twin brother Ron. They and an older sister, Jerrie, grew up there and in Tallahassee, Florida, and St. Louis, Missouri, before the family settled in Los Angeles, California. Wallace spent three years in the U.S. Marines, where his service included judo instruction at Camp Pendleton in California. Working as "manufacturer's representative in a clothing business", he attended college at night and later entered law school. During this time he worked for the Los Angeles County Sheriff's Department, Juvenile Division, Vice Squad. He went on to form a company manufacturing "plastic advertising specialties" and another producing "three-dimensional photographs" before founding Marvelmania International. At the time of the biography, he was married to Jana Wallace and had a nine-month-old daughter, Desiree.

=== First membership kit ===
The first Marvelmania International membership kits included eight items for $1.75 plus 25¢ shipping:

- Membership card
- Two-foot × three-foot Captain America poster ("Cap Goes Wild!"), adapted from the cover of Captain America #106 (Oct. 1968)
- One of four different 12-inch × 12-inch (300 mm) decal sheets, randomly chosen
- Six-inch (152 mm) high Hulk decal (advertised as eight-inch)
- 16-page merchandise catalog with an original Jack Kirby-drawn cover
- Return envelope with image of Doctor Doom
- "Mad Money" 42-cent coupon with image of Doctor Doom, and either
- Marvelmania Magazine #1 test issue (Oct. 1969), mailed with first 5,000 kits, or
- Marvelmania newsletter, a.k.a. Marvelmania flyer

Marvelmania Magazine #1 listed Don Wallace as publisher and Mark Evanier as editor, with articles by Evanier, Tony Isabella, Bruce Schweiger and Ed Noonchester. The black-and-white front cover featured Captain America, penciled and inked by Jack Kirby. The back cover featured Spider-Man penciled and inked by Jim Steranko.

=== Marvelmania Magazine ===
A six-issue fan magazine, titled Marvelmania Magazine on its covers and Marvelmania Monthly Magazine in its copyright indicia, followed the test issue and newsletter. The first issue was dated April 1970 in its indicia; the last issue, undated, was released in early 1971 and carried a 1970 copyright. Additionally, Marvelmania published a variant issue #4 with a blue-tinted cover and some different articles. A newsletter, Marvelmania Messenger, was released between issues #1 and #2. The magazine was copyrighted by Dimensional Industries, Inc., with issues #2-6 specifying that Marvelmania International was "a division of" that corporation.

As with the test magazine, Don Wallace is listed as publisher, and Mark Evanier as editor through issue #3. The fourth issue was released in two variant printings following Evanier's departure with Bruce Schweiger and Jonathan Yost listed as "Co-editors". Issues #5-6 lists Schweiger, Yost and Gary Lowenthal as "Editors".

Evanier wrote in 2002: "The fellow who operated Marvelmania was not the most honest guy in the world. I worked there a while and quit when the full magnitude of his duplicity became apparent. Many of us were either never paid, or paid way less than we were owed".

The black-and-white covers' subjects were:

- #1 — Black Bolt: signed, 1970 Jack Kirby pencil art (April 1970)
- #2 — Conan the Barbarian: Barry Smith pencil art, cover of Conan the Barbarian #1 (Oct. 1970)
- #3 — Starhawk: Dan Adkins art; signed
- #4 — Sub-Mariner: unspecified artist pencil art
- #5 — Spider-Man: Jack Kirby pencil art
- #6 — Neal Adams pencil art; signed

=== Later membership kits ===
Two membership kits followed the initial offering. Membership kit two was identical to the first but with the "Cap Goes Wild!" poster replaced by one of eight color Marvelmania posters (see below), randomly chosen, and a copy of Marvelmania Monthly Magazine #1 (April 1970).

The third and final membership kit contained a different membership card, a membership certificate, Marvelmania Magazine #3, Marvelmania Catalog #2, and six 8-inch (200 mm) × 11-inch, black-and-white "Marvel Art Masterpieces" pinups.

=== Posters ===
In 1969, Marvelmania produced 11 two-foot × three-foot posters, all but one in color:

- Captain America ("Cap Goes Wild!"), adapted from the cover of Captain America #106 (Oct. 1968)
- Thor, Captain America and Spider-Man ("Be a Super-Hero! Give Toys for Tots") public-service promotion for the U.S. Marine Corps Reserve "Toys for Tots" program, penciled and inked by Jack Kirby
- Spider-Man by Jack Kirby, replaced by
- Spider-Man by John Romita Sr.
- Fantastic Four by Jack Kirby
- Black Knight
- Hulk by Herb Trimpe, based on a Jack Kirby design
- Captain America by Jim Steranko
- Galactus and the Silver Surfer by Jack Kirby
- Thor by Jack Kirby
- Doctor Doom by Jack Kirby

Regarding the art's provenance, Marvelmania Magazine editor and comics historian Mark Evanier wrote in 2002:

Jack [Kirby] was promised hefty sums of cash to draw dozens of things, including eight posters of Marvel heroes that the guy at Marvelmania promised to market. The eight drawings represented some of Jack's finest work, and he actually inked them himself, which was something he rarely did. Only four of the eight were ever issued and, though poorly printed, they sold well...which, of course, did not mean that Jack received the promised hefty sums. He got only a few bucks for the four that were released and nothing at all for the others.

=== Other merchandise ===
Additional Marvelmania merchandise included eight pinback buttons, depicting Captain America, Doctor Doom, the Fantastic Four, the Hulk, the Silver Surfer, Spider-Man, and the Sub-Mariner, all drawn by Jack Kirby; a 12-page "Marvelmania Comics Artist Inking And Coloring Kit" of black-and-white or blue-and-white preexisting images from Marvel Comics; a 12-page "Jack Kirby Portfolio"; and a seven-artist "Self-Portrait Kit" featuring 8½-inch × 11-inch (280 mm) card-stock self-portraits, plus signature characters, by John Buscema, Gene Colan, Jack Kirby, John Romita Sr., Marie Severin, Jim Steranko, and Herb Trimpe, with a biography on the reverse of each; a 29-page Spider-Man portfolio; a 27-page Daredevil portfolio; a 12-photograph "Bullpen Photo Portfolio"; two stationery kits; and six small, silver-colored plastic figurines called "Super-Hero Models" that were recast from the 1967 "Marx Super-Heroes" plastic figurines.

== Demise ==
Evanier wrote in 2003 that he discovered Marvelmania "was taking orders for such items and cashing the checks, and once in a rare while, they'd actually produce an item and ship it out. But a lot of kids were shamelessly ripped-off and when it became apparent that this was happening, I quit, as did my friend Steve Sherman, who was also working there. A few months later, the guy who owned and operated the company upped and vanished to avoid a legion of creditors, and has not been seen since". Evanier further recalled to historian Marc Flores, who writes under the pen name Ronin Ro, that after suspecting business problems, he arrived at the tiny Marvelmania office one day to see original Jack Kirby art, loaned to Marvelmania for reproduction, being given to local comics fans in exchange for mail-room duties. Ro writes:

... things at Marvelmania continued to fall apart. The guy who ran the place had overextended himself. He had great ideas for full-color catalogs and posters, but just as many outstanding bills from printers. [Steve] Sherman quit working there. Three weeks later, after completing the next Marvelmania fanzine, Evanier also left. Soon, creditors came after the guy who ran the place, the sheriff shut him down, and the police sat there and took the funds as they came in the door. Employees who left work on a Friday arrived on Monday to find the guy had 'cleaned the place out and disappeared'.

The "Bullpen Bulletins" page in Marvel comics cover-dated December 1971 contained a "Special Notice" reading: "Just as this issue went to press, we learned that Marvelmania International, the club which has been advertising in our pages for some months, has been officially disbanded. No more memberships or orders should be sent to Marvelmania".

The in-house Marvel fanzine FOOM followed from late 1972 to mid-1978.
