= Baxter Building =

Fictional building in the Marvel Universe

- The original Baxter Building as depicted in Fantastic Four Annual #1 (1963). Art by Jack Kirby.
- First appearance: Original version: Fantastic Four #3 (March 1962); Current version: Fantastic Four vol. 3 #38 (February 2001)
- Created by: Stan Lee; Jack Kirby

In-universe information
- Type: Building
- Location: New York City, U.S.
- Publisher: Marvel Comics

The Baxter Building is a fictional 35-story office building appearing in American comic books published by Marvel Comics. Created by Stan Lee and Jack Kirby, the building first appeared in Fantastic Four #3 (March 1962). The construction is depicted in Manhattan, and its five upper floors house the Fantastic Four's headquarters.

== Publication history ==
The Baxter Building first appeared in Fantastic Four #3 (March 1962) and was created by Stan Lee and Jack Kirby. The Baxter Building was the first comic-book superhero lair to be well known to the general public in the fictional world.

The Baxter Building is destroyed in Fantastic Four #278 (May 1985), written and drawn by John Byrne. Explaining why he chose to destroy the iconic structure, Byrne said, "The FF's HQ building had long been established as 35 stories in height. Quite impressive in 1962, but not so much in 1980, when I came to the book. It didn't seem like I could just start referring to the building as taller than all those previous stories had made it, so I decided on something a wee bit more dramatic."

== Fictional description ==
Located at 42nd Street and Madison Avenue in New York City, it had been built in 1949 by the Leland Baxter Paper Company. Originally designed as a high-rise industrial site to accommodate pulp recycling machinery to serve the mid-Manhattan area, each floor height is 24 feet (7.3 m). The top five floors of the 35-story building were purchased outright by the Fantastic Four.

The building's steel frame construction utilized the first application of "K bracing" in the world and is one of the strongest structures of its kind. The Baxter Building is located a few city blocks from the United Nations Building. Reed Richards has applied for many land-use zone variations to allow massive reconstruction of the top five floors for the installation of a heavily silenced silo, with a muffled rocket.

The design of the headquarters of the Fantastic Four is along strictly utilitarian lines, except for apartments and public areas. All aspects of the design are constantly being improved, including security. For example, windows are 2 ft (0.61 m) thick composites of various glasses and plastics which are mirrored on the outside. Solid, armored, exterior walls are also mirror-clad and are indistinguishable from transparent sections.

The top five sections of the Baxter Building are completely airtight; all doors are airlocks. Complete environmental support (including atmosphere) is provided by the area between elevators 2, 3, and 4 on all floors.

The buffer-zone is the interface between the top five floors and the lower levels. It provides a rapid-disconnect between upper and lower segments of building. It contains an array of large oil-rams to dampen any oscillations between the five upper levels and the base of the building. The buffer-zone contains some support equipment for the upper levels, but mostly it is the "mechanical floor", which provides heating, ventilation, air-conditioning and elevator support equipment for the lower 30 stories.

=== Ownership ===
A running gag for years in the title was that the landlord Walter Collins was initially eager to rent out to a superhero team for the publicity and prestige, but he soon regretted his decision, as the building became a constant target for numerous attacks by supervillains starting with Fantastic Four #6 in which Doctor Doom launched the entire building into outer space. The attacks made things difficult not only for the Fantastic Four, but for the other tenants in the lower floors as well. Eventually, Reed Richards decided to invoke a clause of the rental agreement and bought the entire building to avoid eviction.

=== Iterations ===
Eventually, the building was destroyed by Doctor Doom's adopted son Kristoff Vernard, who shot it into space and exploded it in a bid to murder the Fantastic Four. It was replaced by Four Freedoms Plaza, built upon the same site. After the Fantastic Four and other costumed heroes were presumed dead in the wake of their battle with Onslaught, Four Freedoms Plaza was stripped clean of all the FF's equipment by Vernard and Reed Richards' father Nathaniel, who sent it into the Negative Zone to keep it out of the hands of the United States military.

Upon their return, the Fantastic Four could not move back into Four Freedoms Plaza, as it had been destroyed by the Thunderbolts, shortly after the revelation that they were actually the Avengers' longtime foes, the Masters of Evil. Thus, the Fantastic Four moved into a retrofitted warehouse along the Hudson River which they named Pier 4. The warehouse was destroyed during a battle with Diablo, after which the team received a new Baxter Building, courtesy of Reed's former professor Noah Baxter. This Baxter Building was constructed in Earth's orbit and teleported into the vacant lot formerly occupied by the original Baxter Building and Four Freedoms Plaza. The current Baxter Building's ground floor is used as a Fantastic Four gift shop and museum open to the public.

In the aftermath of the collapse of the multiverse, the Fantastic Four have disbanded as the Richards family reconstruct the multiverse, leaving the Thing to join the Guardians of the Galaxy, while the Torch is working as an ambassador for the Inhumans and a member of the Avengers Unity Squad. As a result, the deserted Baxter Building was up for auction, until it was purchased to serve as the temporary headquarters of Parker Industries. Peter Parker explains that he bought the Baxter Building solely to keep it from being acquired by corrupt companies such as Alchemax and Roxxon, and will give the Baxter Building back when the Fantastic Four reunites. When Parker Industries is destroyed during Secret Empire, the Baxter Building is sold to an anonymous buyer and briefly serves as the headquarters of the Fantastix. The building is once again destroyed by the Griever at the End of All Things in an attempt to stop a portal across time and space.

== Reception ==
=== Accolades ===
- In 2019, Comic Book Resources (CBR) ranked the Baxter Building 9th in their "10 Most Iconic Superhero Hideouts In Marvel Comics" list.
- In 2020, CBR ranked the Baxter Building 7th in their "10 Best Secret Lairs In Marvel Comics" list and 10th in their "Avengers 10 Best Headquarters" list.

== Other versions ==
=== Marvel 1602 ===
An unnamed manor house owned by a Lord Baxter from Earth-311 appears in the Marvel 1602 miniseries Marvel 1602: Fantastick Four. After renting it out from Lord Baxter, Sir Richard Reed equips it with an observatory and chemical laboratory.

=== Old Man Quill ===
The Baxter Building of Earth-21923 appears in Old Man Quill. This version was converted into a missile used to kill Loki, with its remnants being sought after by individuals from other galaxies.

=== Spider-Verse ===
The Baxter Building of Earth-802 appears in the Spider-Verse tie-in series Scarlet Spiders. This version serves as a base and clone production facility overseen by Jennix of the Inheritors, who also employs the Human Torch as head of security before Ben Reilly destroys the building.

=== Ultimate Marvel ===
A government organization from Earth-1610 called the Baxter Foundation appears in the Ultimate Marvel imprint. It is a US government think tank that offers exceptionally gifted children government positions in exchange for using their intelligence to serve their country. Additionally, their primary facility is overseen by General "Thunderbolt" Ross, with Willie Lumpkin serving as head of security, while an Oregon facility is referenced.

== In other media ==
=== Television ===
- The Baxter Building appears in Fantastic Four (1967).
- The Baxter Building appears in the first season of Fantastic Four (1994), with Lavina Forbes (voiced by Joan Lee) serving as its landlady.
- The Baxter Building appears in Fantastic Four: World's Greatest Heroes, with Courtney Bonner-Davis (voiced by Laura Drummond) serving as its landlady. This version is an Art Deco inspired 30-40 story building with an additional tower taller than the original building built on the roof. Additionally, due to various inter-dimensional threats and supervillain attacks, the majority of the building is vacant, but suffers no financial stress.
- The Baxter Building appears in The Avengers: Earth's Mightiest Heroes.
- The Baxter Building appears in Hulk and the Agents of S.M.A.S.H..

=== Film ===
- The Baxter Building appears in Fantastic Four (2005), represented by the Marine Building, which was selected for its Art Deco appearance.
- The Baxter Building appears in Fantastic Four: Rise of the Silver Surfer, represented once more by the Marine Building. According to screenwriter Don Payne, "The Baxter Building, because [the Fantastic Four] are more successful and making more money, has been refurbished. So it's not as grungy, more high tech."
- The Baxter Building, renamed the Baxter Institute, appears in Fantastic Four (2015) as a government-funded think tank for scientific youngsters founded by Franklin Storm.

=== Video games ===
- The Baxter Building appears in Spider-Man and Venom: Maximum Carnage.
- A game world loosely based on the Baxter Building called Baxter Plaza appears in Marvel Super Hero Squad Online.
- The Baxter Building appears in Ultimate Spider-Man.
- The Baxter Building appears as a map in the Fantastic Four (2005) film tie-in game.
- The Baxter Building appears in Marvel: Ultimate Alliance.
- The Baxter Building appears in The Incredible Hulk.
- The Baxter Building appears in Spider-Man: Web of Shadows.
- The Baxter Building appears in the background of the Daily Bugle stage in Marvel vs. Capcom 3: Fate of Two Worlds / Ultimate Marvel vs. Capcom 3.
- The Baxter Building appears as a level in Lego Marvel Super Heroes.
- The Baxter Building appears in Marvel Snap.
- The Baxter Building appears as a landmark in Spider-Man 2.
- The Baxter Building appears as a map in Marvel Rivals.

=== Miscellaneous ===
- The Baxter Building appears in New York Skyride.
- The Baxter building appears in Universal Islands of Adventure's "Marvel Super Hero Island".

== See also ==
- Avengers Mansion
- Stark Tower
- X-Mansion
