= Kristoff Vernard =

Fictional character in Marvel Comics

- Kristoff Vernard as depicted in Fantastic Four #397 (February 1995). Art by Paul Ryan and Dan Bulanadi.

Publication information
- Publisher: Marvel Comics
- First appearance: As Kristoff: Fantastic Four #247 (October 1982); As Doctor Doom: Fantastic Four #278 (May 1985)
- Created by: John Byrne

In-story information
- Species: Human
- Team affiliations: Fantastic Four
- Notable aliases: Doctor Doom; Kristoff Von Doom
- Abilities: Genius intelligence; Powered armor grants: Superhuman strength and durability; Flight via rocket boots; Energy projection

Kristoff Vernard (formerly known as Kristoff von Doom and Dr. Doom) is a fictional character appearing in American comic books published by Marvel Comics. The adoptive son of Victor von Doom, he has been involved mainly with the Fantastic Four, as an enemy, ally, and even short-term member.

== Publication history ==
Kristoff first appeared in John Byrne's "back to the basics" Fantastic Four run in issue #247 in October 1982. John Byrne revealed his original plans for Kristoff, stating "I intended Doom to return to Latvaria and absolutely FREAK OUT when he discovered what his robots had done to Kristoff. Basically -- he'd need a whole lot of new robots by the time he calmed down. And then he would devote a whole lot of time and energy to restoring Kristoff. (I had not decided if he would be successful. Part of my brain wanted him to realize he needed the help of the other smartest guy on the planet -- and there was no way he could ever go there!")

Kristoff served as heir to Doctor Doom, occasional ruler of Latveria, a probationary member of the Fantastic Four, and temporal adventurer alongside Nathaniel Richards.

The character next appears in Fantastic Four #258-259 (September–October 1983) and first appears as the second Doctor Doom in Fantastic Four #278-279 (May–June 1985). After a few scattered appearances, Kristoff Vernard becomes a semi-regular cast member in Fantastic Four #400 (May 1995). He reappeared in FF #2, ruling Latveria in Doom's absence.

An alternate future version appeared as an adult in the MC2 universe, beginning in A-Next #5 (1998), followed by scattered appearances, but was only featured regularly in Fantastic Five #1-5 (September–November 2007).

Doctor Doom received an entry in the Official Handbook of the Marvel Universe Update '89 #2, and the All-New Official Handbook of the Marvel Universe A-Z #12 (2007).

== Fictional character biography ==
After being ousted as leader of Latveria, Doctor Doom returns to the country with the Fantastic Four to overthrow its then-leader Zorba. Doom meets the young Kristoff and his mother. While conversing with them, Kristoff's mother is killed by one of Zorba's robots for violating curfew. Furious at the death of a woman who was standing in his presence and therefore should have been regarded as being under his protection, Doom destroys the robot and defeated Zorba. Doctor Doom adopts Kristoff as his heir and takes him to live in Castle Doom.

Kristoff explaining his origin. Art by Paul Ryan and Dan Bulanadi.

Following the apparent death of Doctor Doom during a battle with Terrax and the Fantastic Four, Doom's robots take Kristoff and implanted him with Doom's mental patterns and detailed memories. However, he stops the process before it can be completed. Now believing that he is Doom, Kristoff attempts to kill the Fantastic Four by destroying the Baxter Building. The Fantastic Four survive the explosion due to being protected by Invisible Woman and manage to stop Kristoff. He is imprisoned in Four Freedoms Plaza, the new home of the Four.

Kristoff is still convinced that he is Doom and Mister Fantastic hopes to restore him to his normal personality. At this time, the real Doom returns. Kristoff escapes prison with the aid of a Doombot sent to kidnap Franklin Richards, son of Mister Fantastic and the Invisible Woman, who possesses immense psychic abilities. Doom intends to use Franklin to bargain for the soul of his mother Cynthia, who is being held captive by Mephisto. Doom admits his failure to save Cynthia, demonstrating a lack of confidence to the Doombots present. The Doombots turn on Doom, who is forced to flee. Kristoff takes control of Latveria until Doom infiltrates his castle and speaks a codeword that reverts Kristoff to his original personality. Doom reclaims his throne while Kristoff is sent as a decoy to battle Mr. Fantastic and is killed in battle.

Nathaniel Richards resurrects Kristoff along with Doom's former guardian Boris, who is actually Zarrko in disguise. Kristoff becomes a closely monitored member of the Fantastic Four and close friends with Cassie Lang, who has joined the team following the "death" of Mister Fantastic. He eventually leaves the group and is reunited with Doom.

Kristoff is the main antagonist in the Spider-Man/Fantastic Four miniseries, setting up an elaborate plan to depose Doom and take his place. This culminates in him seeking the aid of Spider-Man and the Fantastic Four to help in his final plan, regarding them as Doom's greatest enemies. Although Kristoff attacks them when they turn him down, claiming that they were willing to just 'forget' him after the Onslaught incident, Spider-Man and the Thing discover an old family photo album which includes pictures of Kristoff's time with the team. Despite this, Kristoff rejects the team and departs in anger, swearing to destroy Doom himself.

Kristoff Vernard hires She-Hulk as his lawyer to apply for political asylum in the United States, but she ends up facing a small army of Doombots. After defeating the Doombots, She-Hulk succeeds in granting him political asylum, only for Doctor Doom to break into the courthouse and kidnap him. She-Hulk then goes to Latveria to rescue Kristoff only for him and Doom to have a pep-talk, where he expresses his desire to follow his own path in life. After the talk, Doom allows Kristoff and She-Hulk to leave Latveria.

Doctor Doom is later involved in a confrontation with Ionela Novothy, the Symkarian "ringleader" of a coup against Doom. When the war concludes and Symkaria is annexed into Latveria, Doom appoints Kristoff as the governor of southern Latveria.

== Powers and abilities ==
Kristoff Vernard has no superpowers, but he is a skilled scientist and magician.

=== Equipment ===
He once worn a suit of armor that granted him some access to its functions.

== Other versions ==
Several alternate universe versions of Kristoff Vernard have appeared throughout the character's publication history. In Franklin Richards: Son of a Genius, Vernard is a foreign exchange student and a classmate of Franklin Richards. In House of M, Vernard is a member of Doctor Doom's Fearsome Four who is known as the Inhuman Torch and possesses pyrokinetic abilities, serving as a parallel to the Human Torch. In the alternate universe of MC2, Vernard is a member of the Fantastic Five who is known as Doom.

== In other media ==
Kristoff Vernard appears as an alternate costume for Doctor Doom in Marvel Ultimate Alliance.

== See also ==
- Doctor Doom
