= Four Freedoms Plaza =

Location in the Marvel Universe

- First appearance: Fantastic Four #296 (November 1986)
- Publisher: Marvel Comics

Four Freedoms Plaza is a fictional structure appearing in American comic books published by Marvel Comics. It is depicted as being located in the Manhattan of the Marvel Universe; it served as the replacement headquarters for the Fantastic Four when their original dwelling, the Baxter Building, was destroyed by Kristoff Vernard, the adoptive son of Doctor Doom. It is located at 42nd Street and Madison Avenue in New York City. The title of the building comes from a Franklin D. Roosevelt speech urging the Congress of the United States to enter World War II. In the speech, Roosevelt outlined the Four Freedoms the world would enjoy if it united together to defeat the Axis Power.

== Publication history ==
Four Freedoms Plaza first appeared in Fantastic Four #296 (November 1986). It is unknown who designed the building; since the building debuted shortly after the end of John Byrne's run on Fantastic Four, many fans assumed that he designed it. Byrne has stated that his design for the Fantastic Four's new headquarters was completely different than that of Four Freedoms Plaza, simply recycling of his design for the LexCorp tower.

Four Freedoms Plaza received an entry in the Official Handbook of the Marvel Universe Update '89 #3.

== Fictional history ==
By the time of the original Baxter Building's destruction, Reed Richards realizes that his increasing amount of inventions and equipment is taking up all of the Fantastic Four's available space. Richards creates Four Freedoms Plaza, a 100-story building designed to his specifications. The top section is built to show the numeral 4 on each side. Of the 100 floors, the top 50 belong to the Fantastic Four, while the bottom 50 are designated to the former tenants of the Baxter Building.

When Onslaught unleashes an army of Sentinels against New York City, the Fantastic Four are apparently killed while protecting the city. In their absence, the United States government seizes control of Four Freedoms Plaza and attempts to confiscate all of Reed Richards's scientific equipment. However, the Fantastic Four's surviving allies refuse to let the military to gain control of the equipment. Richards's father Nathaniel Richards (with the assistance of Kristoff Vernard) secretly transports the equipment into the Negative Zone.

The Thunderbolts take over residence of Four Freedoms Plaza and eventually destroy it. After returning from an alternate reality that they had been sent to, the Fantastic Four are forced to move into a warehouse along the Hudson River, which is nicknamed "Pier 4". Eventually, Reed Richards and inventor Noah Baxter build a new building on the location of the former Baxter Building.

== Description ==
The building's outer walls and windows are constructed of advanced carbon-fiber composites, said to be nearly comparable in strength to diamond. Numerous small tubes run throughout the sections of the building occupied by the Fantastic Four, enabling Mister Fantastic to easily stretch to any floor or area. One elevator shaft has been deliberately left empty, to facilitate the Human Torch's rapid flight to and from the upper floors. There are a set of "breakaway points" above the 50th and 70th stories with built-in explosive charges, designed to separate the upper floors from the civilian-occupied lower floors should anyone try to lift the building into orbit.

(The following description of the building encompasses David Edward Martin's omitted section of The Fantastic Four Compendium. Please see below source)

Of the 100 story building:

- Floors 1 through 50 belong to the former tenants of the Baxter Building (e.g. Quasar).
- Floors 51-70 are "buffer floors", where the tenants do not have 99 year leases. Reed Richards left this space available in case the team needs more space.
  - Floors 71-100 serve as the headquarters for the team. The layout of the floors is similar to the Baxter Building.
  - Floor 71 is a reception area overseen by Roberta.
  - Floor 72 is an inn for guests of the team. Two suites are maintained solely for aquatic visitors such as Atlanteans.
  - Floors 73-75 are the Fantastic Four's living quarters. Besides the Fantastic Four, the floor also accommodates allies Alicia Masters (later revealed to be the Skrull imposter Lyja), Crystal, Ms. Marvel, Wyatt Wingfoot, and She-Hulk. The floors also have a kitchen, pantry, spa, two gyms, a library, and a computerized classroom.
  - Floors 76 and 77 function as the team's command center. The floors house meeting rooms, communications stations, links to Starcore and other astronomical organizations, and a computerized medical station.
  - Floors 78-80 are storage for miscellaneous supplies. These floors serve as future expansion space and as a buffer in case of incidents in Reed Richards's laboratory. Alicia Masters used a section of Floor 78 as a studio.
  - Floors 81-99 act as Reed Richards's laboratory and storage for his equipment. None of these workstations is located directly overhead any other workstation and no three of them are in a straight line, which minimizes the risk of several stations being destroyed at once.
    - Floors 90 and 91 contain a heavily armored portal to the Negative Zone.
    - Floors 98 and 99 serve as warehouse and machine shops. They support the hangar on 100 and act as a buffer to absorb damage from possible hangar disasters. Floor 99 houses fuel tanks for the Fantastic Four's vehicles.
  - Floor 100 is the Fantastic Four's hangar. It fills the space under the four immense fours that top the building.
- The building's foundation reaches 150' into the Manhattan bedrock. There are ten floors there. Sublevels 1-2 are used by the building's maintenance staff. Sublevels 3-4 contain the freight docks and tenant warehouse facilities. A railroad spur enable large masses of freight to be moved in or out without dealing with traffic. Sublevels 5-15 are restricted to the Fantastic Four. These floors contain special devices and support facilities for floors 71-100. Sublevel 5 contains a water-filled conduit that reaches the Hudson River; this permits aquatic visitors to directly reach the complex.

== In other media ==
The Four Freedoms Plaza appears in the second season of Fantastic Four.
