= Collective Man =

- Collective Man as depicted in All-New Official Handbook of the Marvel Universe #2 (February 2006). Art by Salvador Larroca (penciller), Danny Miki (inker), and Chris Sotomayor (colorist).

Publication information
- Publisher: Marvel Comics
- First appearance: The Incredible Hulk vol. 2 #250 (Aug. 1980)
- Created by: Bill Mantlo; Sal Buscema

In-story information
- Alter ego: Sun, Chang, Ho, Lin, and Han Tao-Yu
- Species: Human Mutants
- Team affiliations: People's Defense Force; The 198; Mutant Liberation Front; 3-Peace; Death's Champions
- Abilities: Ability to merge into a single being possessing five times the physical and mental ability of a single Tao-Yu brother Ability to temporarily increase these powers by mentally drawing upon outside energy, while in a collective state Ability to communicate telepathically and teleport to each other via psychic/spiritual-link Infectious replication Assimilative size alteration.

The Collective Man (Sun, Chang, Ho, Lin, and Han Tao-Yu) is a Chinese superhero appearing in American comic books published by Marvel Comics. The Collective Man is actually an identity shared by the Tao-Yu brothers, a set of quintuplets. They possess the mutant power to merge into one body, which variously possesses the collective abilities of all five men or all the people of China. The brothers also share a psychic/spiritual link that allows them to telepathically communicate and teleport to one another.

== Publication history ==
The Collective Man first appeared in The Incredible Hulk vol. 2 #250 (Aug. 1980), and was created by Bill Mantlo and Sal Buscema.

== Fictional character biography ==
The five Tao-Yu brothers are Chinese farmers who were taken into government custody after their mutant abilities manifested and trained to be government agents. The Collective Man is first seen in the Grandmaster's contest, in which various international superheroes battle as the proxies of either the Grandmaster or his opponent Death. The Collective Man is teamed with Storm and Shamrock (all unknowingly proxies of Death) in battle against the Grandmaster's proxies Captain America, Sasquatch and Blitzkrieger; their battle ends when Shamrock claims the prize.

Some time after the contest, the Collective Man battles the Hulk. At some point, the brothers' power decrease so that they only possess the abilities of five men as the Collective Man. When their superiors in the Chinese military prevent them from visiting their dying mother, Mary, the brothers rebel and battle the god Ho-Ti, who is apparently working with the government. However, Ho-Ti sees the futility of the battle and surrendered. After the brothers discover how China has mistreated mutants, they join the revolutionary group 3-Peace to fight the Mutant Liberation Front and the nationalistic China Force.

The Collective Man, now restored to full power, is mystically altered by the fallen god Marduk, who sought to use the Tao-Yu brothers' power to steal the life energy of every person in China in order to reclaim his divinity. The process of absorbing this life energy transforms Collective Man into a raging giant. Citizen V and his V-Battalion battle the Collective Man, with the Battalion agent Goldfire accidentally dying in the battle. Citizen V punctures Collective Man's skin, causing him to explode and apparently die. He survives and the brothers return to their normal form, now gaining the ability to increase size when merged and to generate additional duplicate bodies. The Collective Man, as part of the People's Defense Force, join the Mighty Avengers and other assembled Avengers teams in defeating the Unspoken, an exiled Inhuman king seeking to enslave the Earth.

== Powers and abilities ==
The five Tao-Yu brothers possess the mutant ability to fuse into a superhuman physical form. It is possible for only a few brothers to merge into this collective being, however, they prefer to merge all at once. The brothers also possess a psychic/spiritual link that lets them communicate telepathically and teleport to each other's location. Sometime later they displayed the ability of self-spawning, where the brothers in separate or unified form can convert others into collective man clones who follow their every directive. These overwritten clones can also fuse into the prime Collective Man to become a massive giant, pooling all their variable physical abilities into it. This turning ability seems to have no discernible limits as he/they were capable of converting and assimilating near the entire population of China to become a continent spanning kaiju. However, his enlarged form is strenuous to maintain, with prolonged use causing him to collapse.

In addition, they have also been shown to be decently skilled martial artists in peak human physical condition.

== Reception ==
Collective Man's creation has been viewed in the context of relations between the United States and China after the Sino-Soviet split, when the United States established diplomatic ties with China. Collective Man was initially depicted as a Chinese stereotype, with their powers invoking the idea of the Yellow Peril and the collective of China, capable of opposing the Western world. In later appearances, the character was depicted as less stereotypical, with less elements of Chinese nationalism.
