= Marvel Super Hero Contest of Champions =

Comic book limited series

Contest of Champions
- Cover of Contest of Champions #1 (June 1982). Art by John Romita Jr. and Bob Layton.

Publication information
- Publisher: Marvel Comics
- Schedule: Monthly
- Format: Limited series
- Publication date: June–August 1982
- No. of issues: 3
- Main character(s): Daredevil; Talisman; Darkstar; Invisible Girl; Iron Fist; Sunfire; She-Hulk; Captain Britain; Defensor

Creative team
- Written by: Mark Gruenwald; Bill Mantlo; Steven Grant
- Penciller: John Romita Jr.
- Inker: Pablo Marcos
- Letterer(s): Rick Parker, typeset

Marvel Super Hero Contest of Champions is a three-issue comic book limited series published from June to August 1982 by Marvel Comics. The series was written by Mark Gruenwald, with pencils by John Romita Jr., inks by Pablo Marcos, and additional art by Bob Layton.

This series was significant as it was Marvel's first published limited series. Contest of Champions brought forth the idea of a major event affecting the Marvel Universe; it introduced crossovers before the concept of multi-title crossovers was even conceived.

An unrelated five issue limited series published in 1999, Contest of Champions II, is a sequel in title only.

== Publication history ==
The story was intended to be a celebration of the 1980 Summer Olympics held in Moscow, and depicted Marvel superheroes engaging in competitions. This was complicated when the United States refused to participate in the Olympics as a protest against the Soviet invasion of Afghanistan in late 1979. However, the comic was already mostly complete, so Marvel published Contest of Champions two years later, with a reworked storyline that avoided any connection to the Olympics.

== Plot summary ==
An Elder of the Universe, the Grandmaster, challenges a hooded female called the "Unknown"—eventually revealed to be Death—to a game for the life of his fellow Elder, the Collector (killed by the cosmic being Korvac in the title Avengers). The pair decide to use various superheroes from Earth as pawns, the goal being to collect the four pieces of a prize called the "Golden Globe of Life". A victory for the Grandmaster's team means the Collector may be resurrected, while a loss indicates the character must remain dead.

The Grandmaster's team consists of Captain America, Talisman, Darkstar, Captain Britain, Wolverine, Defensor, Sasquatch, Daredevil, Peregrine, She-Hulk, the Thing, and Blitzkrieg.

Death's team consists of Iron Man, Vanguard, Iron Fist, Shamrock, Storm, Arabian Knight, Sabra, Invisible Girl, Angel, Black Panther, Sunfire, and the Collective Man.

Although the storyline depicts a tie and the Grandmaster's team is written as being successful, Death advises that the Collector can only be resurrected if the Grandmaster takes his fellow Elder's place in the Realm of the Dead, with the character agreeing to the terms. International heroes Blitzkrieg (Germany); Collective Man (China); Defensor (Argentina); Peregrine (France); Shamrock (Ireland); and Talisman (Australia) debut in the series, and each issue contained a catalogue of all featured heroes and was the prototype for the publication the Official Handbook of the Marvel Universe.

The 2015 series Deadpool's Secret Secret Wars revealed that alongside the main contest a bonus round occurred featuring lesser-to-unknown characters. The Grandmaster's team consists of Rocket Racer, She-Man-Thing, The Vile Tapeworm, and Frog-Man. Death's team consists of Deadpool, Howard the Duck, Doop and The Pink Sphinx. Death's team wins, the prize being a 'participant' trophy.

An Avengers Annual eventually reveals that this was a ruse perpetrated by the Grandmaster as he is able to steal Death's powers and then, via another deception, forces the entity to banish all Elders from her realm, effectively making them immortal.

== In other media ==
=== Television ===
- A version of the Contest of Champions storyline was adapted in Fantastic Four: World's Greatest Heroes. In this version, the Grandmaster pits the Fantastic Four against Ronan the Accuser, Impossible Man, Annihilus, and the Super-Skrull. In the end, the Thing defeats Ronan and saves Earth from destruction.
- A variation of the Contest of Champions was adapted in the self-titled four-part season three finale of Ultimate Spider-Man. As opposed to the comic book storyline, Spider-Man teams up with the Avengers, the New Warriors, the Agents of S.M.A.S.H., and the Collector to save Earth from the Grandmaster and his army of supervillains. Ultimately, Spider-Man and the Collector defeat the Grandmaster and saves Earth from destruction.

=== Film ===
In Thor: Ragnarok, the Contest of Champions is the name of the gladiatorial event the Grandmaster runs on Sakaar. In the film, Thor is forced to do battle with the Hulk in the contest.

=== Video games ===
The comic book was adapted into a 2014 fighting game for Android and iOS with a similar title, Marvel Contest of Champions.

=== Miscellaneous ===
Scott Lobdell began submitting stories for Marvel, based on these characters for short stories in Marvel Comics Presents.

== Collected editions ==
Title	Material collected	Published date	ISBN
Avengers: The Contest	Contest of Champions #1–3, West Coast Avengers Annual #2, Avengers Annual #16	June 2010	978-0785145066
