= Pizzazz (magazine) =

Magazine published by Marvel Comics

- Editor: Bobby Miller
- Categories: Pop culture, comics
- Frequency: Monthly
- Publisher: Marvel Comics
- First issue: October 1977
- Final issue: January 1979
- Country: United States
- Language: English

Pizzazz was a magazine published by Marvel Comics from 1977 to 1979, for a total run of 16 issues. Aimed at youth culture, Pizzazz mostly contained articles about popular movies, rock stars, et cetera, as well as comic strips and puzzles.

== Contents ==
Recurring features included a comic about Amy Carter's life as the President's daughter, a serialized Star Wars comic, and a one-page comic by Harvey Kurtzman (typically a "Hey Look!" piece done for the Marvel predecessor Timely Comics in the 1940s) on the last page. Regular columns included the reader dream-analyzing "Dream Dimensions" and the advice column "Dear Wendy". Once the magazine was established, a regular feature was a full-page illustration of some crowded scene in which the names of readers who had written letters to the magazine were hidden.

The covers showed either photos of popular celebrities, or photo-realistic drawings of celebrities and/or Marvel superheroes. Shaun Cassidy was featured on six covers, The Hulk appeared on five covers, Spider-Man on four, and Peter Frampton on three.

Topics mentioned in the magazine included (but were not limited to):

- The original Star Wars film
- Grease
- Meat Loaf
- The film Sgt. Pepper's Lonely Hearts Club Band
- Battlestar Galactica
- Superman: The Movie

=== Serialized Star Wars stories ===
The 1977 installments of the serialized Star Wars comic featured in Pizzazz are the first original Star Wars stories not directly adapted from the films to appear in print form, preceding both the original stories in Marvel's Star Wars comic series and the 1978 novel Splinter of the Mind's Eye.

The first story arc, titled "The Keeper's World", was by Roy Thomas, Howard Chaykin, and Tony DeZuniga. It was later reprinted by Dark Horse Comics. The second story arc, entitled "The Kingdom of Ice", was by Archie Goodwin, Walt Simonson, Klaus Janson, Dave Cockrum, and John Tartaglione. The final two chapters were scheduled to be printed in issues #17 and #18, but the magazine was canceled after the 16th issue. These two chapters were printed, along with the rest of the story, by Marvel UK in their Star Wars Weekly comic, appearing in issue #60 in April 1979.

== See also ==
- FOOM
- Marvel Age
