= Sabra (character) =

Marvel Comics superhero

Sabra סברה
- Sabra as depicted in Captain America: Steve Rogers (2017) #18; Art by Javier Pina

Publication information
- Publisher: Marvel Comics
- First appearance: (Minor); The Incredible Hulk #250 (August 1980) (Full); The Incredible Hulk #256 (February 1981)
- Created by: Bill Mantlo (writer); Sal Buscema (artist)

In-story information
- Alter ego: Ruth Bat-Seraph
- Species: Supersoldier (originally); Human mutant (retconned)
- Place of origin: Jerusalem, Israel
- Team affiliations: X-Corporation; Mossad
- Supporting character of: X-Men; Hulk
- Abilities: Mutant Abilities: Superhuman strength, speed, agility, reflexes, endurance, and stamina; Ability to transfer powers and life energy to others; Regenerative healing factor

Sabra (Hebrew: סברה), also known by her alias Ruth Bat-Seraph (Hebrew: רות בת-שרף), is a superhero appearing in American comic books published by Marvel Comics. Created by writer Bill Mantlo and artist Sal Buscema, the character first appeared in The Incredible Hulk #250 (1980), before making a full appearance in issue #256 (1981). She has been a member of the X-Corporation, appeared as a supporting character for the Hulk and the X-Men, and subsequently made cameo appearances in other Marvel Comics.

Bat-Seraph is a mutant who serves as an agent to the Mossad. She is noted to be the first Israeli superhero and has been received positively by the Jewish community. Shira Haas portrayed a reimagined version of Bat-Seraph, a former Black Widow assassin, in the Marvel Cinematic Universe (MCU) film Captain America: Brave New World (2025), with her inclusion receiving polarizing responses.

== Development ==
=== Concept and creation ===
The character was created by Belinda Glass, the first wife of American comic book writer Mark Gruenwald. The name "Sabra" (צַבָּר) was derived from a term to describe a native-born Israeli Jew, inspired by the prickly pear cactus—a fruit that is tough and thorny on the outside but soft on the inside. She was originally envisioned as the Israeli counterpart to Captain America (Steve Rogers), much like Red Guardian serves as the Russian equivalent. Israeli comics artist Uri Fink argued that his character Sabraman, created a year earlier, was highly popular and influenced the creation of Sabra, with both characters sharing many similarities.

=== Publication history ===
Sabra debuted in The Incredible Hulk #256 (February 1981), created by writer Bill Mantlo and artist Sal Buscema. She appeared in a supporting role in the limited series Union Jack #1–4 (2006) by writer Christos Gage and artist Mike Perkins. She later appeared in The New Warriors (1995), by writer Evan Skolnick and artist Patrick Zircher. She starred in her first solo one-shot, Astonishing Tales: Sabra (2009), written by Matt Yocum.

Since her debut in the 1980s, Sabra has not featured heavily in comics, only making minor cameos and appearances. She was later retconned as a mutant and a vocal supporter of the mutant cause, with the shift beginning with her role in the 1997 crossover Operation: Zero Tolerance. This shift offered potential for deeper character development beyond her identity as a nationalist symbol, and to move her away from direct political associations. Despite this, most of her subsequent appearances were "glorified cameos," and portrayed her as an unquestioning agent of her home state, prioritizing its interests over everyone else's.

== Fictional character biography ==
Ruth Bat-Seraph was born near Jerusalem, raised on a kibbutz, and recruited into a super-soldier-inspired program run by the Israeli government after her mutant powers began to manifest. She later becomes the first superhuman agent to serve with the Mossad (Israeli's secret service). She also becomes a police officer in addition to serving as a government agent. She had a son named Jacob who was killed by a Palestinian terrorist group.

Bat-Seraph's first public act as Sabra is a battle with the Hulk, whom she mistakenly believes is working with terrorists. Not long after that, Sabra is chosen as a pawn of Death in the latter's game against the Grandmaster. There, she meets Iron Man and the Arabian Knight (Abdul Qamar), and battles She-Hulk and Captain Britain.

She faces another dispute with the Hulk in which her quills strike his larynx, leaving him temporarily unable to speak, so Sabra initially believes he is still a near-mindless monster. The two fight but eventually work through their differences and search for a child who is foretold to become a genocidal maniac, while contending with Achilles of the Pantheon who was sent to kill the boy.

Later, during a peace conference in New York City, Sabra assists the New Warriors in stopping a terrorist group. However, she falls under the control of a powerful force and turns against the team. She is brought out of her trance by Justice, whose eyes remind her of her late son. Some time after, Sabra is attacked by Prime Sentinels as part of the anti-mutant campaign known as "Operation: Zero Tolerance". She travels back to the U.S. to track down Bastion, their creator, and works to stop him alongside Iceman, Cecilia Reyes, and Marrow. It is also at this time that Sabra begins to work alongside the X-Men and subscribe to the philosophies of Charles Xavier. Sabra spends some time as a member of the X-Corporation's Paris branch. She accompanies Xavier and other X-Men to Genosha after it is demolished by Sentinels.

During the JLA/Avengers crossover event, she is seen holding the Western Wall together after Krona's attack causes earthquakes across the globe. Sabra is also one of a handful of mutants to have retained their powers after the effects of M-Day. She is later seen, under request from the British government, aiding Union Jack against a terrorist attack on London. She comes into conflict with the new Arabian Knight (Navid Hashim) because of Sabra's "jingoistic" nature, but they begrudgingly work together, paralleling her relationship with the first Arabian Knight during the Contest of Champions. During the Civil War within the US superhero community over the Superhuman Registration Act, Sabra joins Bishop's government-sanctioned team that polices unruly mutants. Mossad assigns her to the force in exchange for intelligence and technology so Israel can enact its own registration program. Sabra is identified as pro-registration in the superhuman Civil War as one of the 142 registered superheroes under the Initiative.

During the events of Secret Invasion, Sabra is briefly seen fighting off Skrulls in Israel, and during the Ends of the Earth storyline, Sabra is one of the heroes that respond to Spider-Man's call for help against Doctor Octopus' satellite factories. She is shown fighting through Octobots at a seemingly abandoned factory until being shot by Crossbones with a sniper rifle. Prior to the events of Secret Empire, Sabra breaks into and secures a flash drive in a Hydra data storage, much to the anger of an alternate Captain America (Hydra Supreme). She later represents the Israeli government when she attends Black Panther's meeting in the Eden Room of Avengers Mountain.

== Characterization ==
Sabra depicted in her original 1980s costume sporting a blue-quilled cape and a Star of David clasp

=== Costumes and equipment ===
Wrist bracelets equipped with neuronic-frequency stunners that shoot "energy quills". Cape has a device that neutralizes gravity, enabling flight.

— Sabra's equipment as quoted in The Marvel Encyclopedia by DeFalco et al. (2019).

Throughout her comic appearances, Sabra's various costumes have always incorporated elements of the Israeli flag, specifically the Star of David, to emphasize her national identity. Upon debut in the 1980s, Sabra's original outfit reflected the "look of the time", using a headband and a "short girl-boss haircut". The outfit was also adorned by an anti-gravity blue cape, with a clasp sporting the Star of David. The cape contains a gravity-polarization device which gives Sabra the power of flight. The cape also has an "optical navigation device which functions as an auto-pilot". She also uses neuronic-frequency stunners built into her two wrist bracelets that shoot "energy quills" (described as small bundles of low-density plasma) which travels below the speed of sound and can paralyze the nervous system of any organic being almost instantaneously.

In the 1990s, Sabra's costume no longer used a cape, as it was "either deemed ridiculous or too complicated to draw". Instead, she was given a "second Star of David clasp at the hip and went for sort of a Cloak vibe", being compared to that of Cloak. Since the 2000s, Sabra's costume has been a black and white body suit with a subtle gray brooch sporting the Star of David. Dissident Muse Journal writer Franklin Einspruch criticised the watering down of her outfit, calling it an "understatement" and that she has become a "generic Western brunette with a meaningless array of belt pouches and a black and white body suit".

In addition to her superhero equipment and powers, Sabra has used standard military weapons and is a trained member of the Israeli military. She has also trained as a policewoman and is well-trained in Krav Maga.

=== Powers and abilities ===
Sabra possesses superhuman abilities due to her mutant heritage, including "superhuman strength, speed, agility, reflexes, endurance, and stamina". Her mutant ability also allows her to transfer her powers and life force to others. Comic Book Resources ranked her at number seven in their list of the "10 Strongest Female Marvel Protagonists". She can withstand high fire impacts including that of Pistol-caliber rifle, and can heal / regenerate faster and more extensively than a regular human being.

== Reception ==
Although there were several attempts to create local superheroes in Israel [...] none of them managed to survive for long. The only ones who succeeded in this mission, even going one step further and creating a female superhero rather than a male one, were the guys from Marvel.

— Nirit Anderman writing for Haaretz.

Sabra has been positively received by the Jewish community, and has been dubbed the "Superheroine of the State of Israel". Noted for being the first and most famous Israeli superheroine, Nirit Anderman of the Israeli newspaper Haaretz noted that despite there being multiple attempts in the late 1970s to create Israeli superheroes, such as Sabraman, Super Shlumper and Falafel Man, none of them took off compared to Sabra. Nicole Lampert of The Jewish Chronicle called the character a "great Jewish superhero", while Brenton Stewart of Comic Book Resources referred to Sabra as one of Marvel's most prominent international superheroes, adding that "while she's never had her own series, she's carved out one of the most fascinating histories [...] in her various encounters with the X-Men, the Hulk and Marvel's other heroes". Cali Halperin of Jewish Telegraphic Agency listed her as one of the "5 Female Jewish Superheroes Everyone Should Know".

Sabra has been included in other character rankings including Screen Rant's "10 Best Marvel Characters Who Made Their Debut In The Hulk Comics" where writer Dalton Norman called her "an important fixture in the Marvel Universe". Deirdre Kaye of Scary Mommy also included Sabra on their list of comic female heroes and role models. In 2022, Margaret David of SlashFilm included Sabra in their "10 Marvel Characters We Expect To See Introduced In MCU Phase 5" list, noting, that "with the world of the Avengers under siege by new paranoia and powers, mirroring our world's rampant and long-standing problem of anti-Semitism, Sabra's probably going to be the vehicle for meaningful commentaries. Further, it's going to be great to see more diversity and faith in our heroes." In December 2025, Sabra was honored at the Martial Arts History Museum in Glendale, California with a "Sabra Day at the Museum" for her Zionist identity and as a symbol of Israeli resilience.

The character has also been received negatively. Sabra's debut issue was noted for establishing her as an "overreactive hard-liner," with later appearances often contrasting her with a "jaunty Marvel icon's moderating influence and an Islamic counterpart created to prove that not all Muslims are bad". Israeli comics artist Uri Fink, who describes her as a "superficial" character with "clumsy" development as an Israeli hero, calling her portrayal both disappointing and problematic. Hagay Giller, another Israeli comic book artist, said Sabra reflects how Americans viewed Israel in the 1980s, "when [Israel] was considered exotic and the Israeli army offered ideological superheroes." He added that the creators "relied on clichés about Israel while doing minimal research". Ultimately, Giller believes the character can be updated, much like other figures in the commercialized comic book world.

The character has also been received negatively by Palestinians and Arabs for valorizing the Mossad, with the Palestinian Campaign for the Academic and Cultural Boycott of Israel (PACBI) finding her appearance in The Incredible Hulk #256 "sickening". Writing for The Daily Beast, Asher Elbein called the character a "mess," noting that Marvel utilises her to represent Israel, she "does not question her government" and is driven by personal loss causing her to respond with prejudice, reinforcing the Arab–Israeli conflict without nuance. In November 2023, the Boycott, Divestment and Sanctions National Committee also called the character a personification of "apartheid Israel" that promotes the "oppression of Palestinians", and called for a boycott against Marvel merchandise during Black Friday of that year.

=== MCU inclusion ===
Ruth Bat-Seraph, portrayed by Israeli actress Shira Haas, in the trailer for Captain America: Brave New World (2025); the character's inclusion received a polarized response

In 2022, it was announced that a version of Sabra would appear in the fourth Captain America film as part of the Marvel Cinematic Universe (MCU). Variety reported that Marvel Studios would be "taking a new approach with the character", and changing her origin, aiming to avoid perpetuating harmful stereotypes, and criticism from pro-Palestinian organizations. This change included only using the name "Ruth Bat-Seraph" and not "Sabra" due to its connection to the Sabra and Shatila massacre, which occurred two years after the character's 1980 comic debut but has since carried negative associations. A week before the theatrical release of the film, now titled Captain America: Brave New World (2025), producer Nate Moore reported that the character would also no longer be a mutant or a Mossad agent, and would instead be depicted as a former Black Widow assassin. Despite the changes to her character, a protest occurred at the film's premiere.

Several critics expressed polarising concerns about Sabra's depiction in the MCU prior to her debut. Palestinian-American writer and analyst Yousef Munayyer called the decision to include her "insensitive" due to the Gaza–Israel conflict. Marvel Comics critic Kent Worcester questioned the decision to include the character in the first place, given her minor role in the comics and the political sensitivities surrounding her. Israeli writer Etgar Keret opined that the character did not reflect modern times, saying that she was created before the first and second Intifadas, adding that she "was created in a totally different reality and state of mind. And now it's tough to keep this kind of icon of simplicity".

With a contrary view, the American Jewish Committee (AJC), a Jewish civil rights group, initially criticized the removal of the character's Israeli identity after some fans mistook the character's origins at the Red Room to mean that she is of Russian-descent. They compared it to changing Captain America's nationality and argued that "identity politics" should not be something superheroes worry about. However, it was later reported on TheWrap that the character would still be of Israeli descent. York University professor Shama Rangwala opined that Marvel "wants to have mass appeal but will likely end up pleasing no one" due to alienating both pro-Israel and pro-Palestinian audiences.

Critical responses to the character were also polarized with many arguing that the MCU's iteration of the character was stripped of her comic counterpart's characteristics (such as being a mutant or having a costume). (Note: As cited by Screen Rant, /Film, and Vulture) In a review for the movie, Vulture writer Darren Franich argued that Bat-Seraph was "buried in a quick shift from vague antagonist to vague ally", adding that "on the page, [Bat-Seraph] was motivated by national pride, but onscreen she has no motivation, quickly becoming an inessential secondary sidekick". The Times of Israel writer Jordan Hoffman criticised the movie but praised Haas saying that, "not even a well-trained Israeli security agent slash assassin can save this movie". Conversely, The Jerusalem Post writer Hannah Brown noted that while "she doesn't wear superhero duds like tights and a cape, she is nevertheless a force to be reckoned with" and also praised Marvel's decision to keep the character Israeli.

== Other versions ==
- An alternate universe version of Sabra from Earth-58163 appears in House of M: Masters of Evil #4 as a member of the Red Guard.
- The severed head of an alternate universe version of Sabra from Earth-1610 appears in Ultimate Comics: Armor Wars #2 as one of the trophies of Doctor Faustus.

== In other media ==
=== Television ===
Sabra makes a non-speaking cameo appearance in the Fantastic Four episode "Doomsday" (1996).

=== Film ===
Ruth Bat-Seraph appears in Marvel Cinematic Universe (MCU) film Captain America: Brave New World (2025), portrayed by Israeli actress Shira Haas. In the film, Bat-Seraph is a former Black Widow assassin who was trained in the Red Room, and is the head of security for President Thaddeus Ross. During an international summit, she fights Isaiah Bradley who attempts to assassinate President Ross and imprisons him; however she eventually discovers that he was under the influence of mind control. She then aids Captain America and Falcon in stopping Samuel Sterns. She later befriends an exonerated Bradley who buys them tickets to a basketball game.

=== Merchandise ===
- The MCU incarnation of Ruth Bat-Seraph received a Funko Pop bobblehead figure.
- The MCU incarnation of Ruth Bat-Seraph received a Lego minifigure in the "Captain America vs. Red Hulk Battle" set.
