= Arabian Knight (character) =

Arabian Knight is a title used by multiple fictional characters appearing in American comic books published by Marvel Comics.

== Publication history ==
Abdul Qamar first appeared in Incredible Hulk vol. 2 #257 (March 1981), and was created by Bill Mantlo (writer) and Al Milgrom (artist).

The successor (Navid Hashim) was created by Christos Gage and Mike Perkins. According to editor Andy Schmidt, "The old one had all the stereotypical trappings—the flying carpet and whatnot. And some of that stuff is incorporated into this new one, but hopefully in a less stereotypical way and not insulting. He's a fully fleshed out character. The other guy was just a visual stereotype with no real character behind him." In addition, Schmidt stated that "We've had the Arabian Knight before, but the last version of the Arabian Knight, I believe, was killed twice without explanation of how he came back between them. He was sort of an insulting stereotype."

== Fictional character biography ==
=== Abdul Qamar ===
Arabian Knight

Publication information
- Publisher: Marvel Comics
- First appearance: The Incredible Hulk vol. 2 #257 (March 1981)
- Created by: Bill Mantlo (writer); Al Milgrom (artist)

In-story information
- Alter ego: Abdul Qamar
- Team affiliations: Desert Sword; Pantheon
- Abilities: Exceptional swordsman Use of magic carpet, sash and scimitar

Abdul Qamar, the first Arabian Knight, is the descendant of a legendary Muslim hero who was killed while forcing the demons Gog and Magog back into their tomb. When the demons are freed by an archeologist, Abdul finds his ancestor's magical equipment inside the tomb and becomes the Arabian Knight, sealing away the demons with help from the Hulk.

Arabian Knight is among the heroes chosen by Death to represent her in the Contest of Champions against the Grandmaster, his teammates being Iron Man and Sabra. He overcomes his dislike of Sabra to win their battle against She-Hulk, Captain Britain, and Defensor.

The Arabian Knight is later revealed to be an agent of the Pantheon. Posing as a member of the organization Desert Sword, he fights against Freedom Force. However, Arabian Knight leaves the Pantheon following a disagreement with Achilles.

Abdul died when Humus Sapien, a powerful mutant whose abilities are powered by the random draining of life from a large number of people, drained him of his life force.

=== Navid Hashim ===
Arabian Knight
- Navid Hashim the third Arabian Knight; Art by Mike Perkins

Publication information
- Publisher: Marvel Comics
- First appearance: Union Jack vol. 3 #1 (Nov. 2006).
- Created by: Christos Gage (writer); Mike Perkins (artist)

In-story information
- Alter ego: Navid Hashim
- Abilities: Wears indestructible uniform that grants him flight and resistance to injury Use of magic sash and scimitar

Navid Hashim - the next Arabian Knight - debuted in 2006's Union Jack (3rd series) #1. Unlike the first two Arabian Knights, the third dresses in contemporary military clothing and appears to have extensive combat experience.

When Red Hulk and Machine Man arrive in Sharzhad, they encounter Arabian Knight who leads them into Sharzhad and to Dagan Shah's palace. Once inside the palace, Shah sheds his disguise, reveals his true identity as the Sultan Magus, and imprisons Red Hulk and Machine Man as it is shown that the real Arabian Knight is imprisoned in a crystal. During Red Hulk and Machine Man's fight with Sultan Magus, Arabian Knight gets free and helps in the fight against Sultan Magus.

== Powers and abilities ==
The first Arabian Knight is a good hand-to-hand combatant and was an exceptional swordsman, particularly in the use of the scimitar. He possesses three magical weapons: a magic carpet, a golden scimitar emitting beams of magical force, and a mind-controlled belt/sash. Indeed, all three items respond, exclusively, to his mental commands. The magic carpet and sash are formed from a material that is virtually indestructible and resistant to fire and bullets. The carpet permitted him to travel, flying, at high speeds and altitudes, while the belt/sash magically elongates to approximately 40 feet (12 m) in length (almost 10 times its typical length), and can serve as a weapon (whip), or as a climbing rope, or to capture and restrain his foes. The golden scimitar, in addition to firing destructive blasts, will "backfire" against any other person who may attempt to wield it.

The next Arabian Knight revealed that the magic carpet used by the first Arabian Knight was unraveled and made into an indestructible uniform that responds to his thoughts. He still uses the magic scimitar and wears the red magic sash around his waist. The uniform serves as body armor that protects him from harm and allows him to fly.

== Reception ==
Comic Book Resources placed the original Arabian Knight as one of the superheroes Marvel wants you to forget.

== Other characters named Arabian Knight ==
An unrelated character named Arabian Knight appeared in Black Panther vol. 4 #15 (June 2006). This version is a Muslim warrior who won the right to use the magical scimitar, carpet, and armor due to trial by combat. This Arabian Knight participates in international attempt to invade Wakanda, but is defeated by Black Panther and Storm.
