= Fantastic Four =

Marvel Comics superhero team

- Promotional art for Fantastic Four: The Lost Adventure #1 (February 2008) depicting (left-to-right): The Thing, Mister Fantastic, Invisible Woman, and the Human Torch. Art by Jack Kirby. (repurposed from his 1970s Marvelmania poster).

Publication information
- Publisher: Marvel Comics
- First appearance: Fantastic Four #1 (November 1961)
- Created by: Stan Lee (writer/editor); Jack Kirby (artist/co-plotter)

In-story information
- Base(s): Baxter Building; Avengers Mansion (formerly); Four Freedoms Plaza; Pier 4; 4 Yancy St.
- Member(s): Mister Fantastic; Invisible Woman; Human Torch; The Thing

Roster

The Fantastic Four, often abbreviated as FF, is a superhero team appearing in American comic books published by Marvel Comics. The team debuted in The Fantastic Four #1 (cover-dated November 1961), helping usher in a new level of realism in the medium. It was the first superhero team created by artist/co-plotter Jack Kirby and editor/writer Stan Lee, and through this title the "Marvel method" style of production came into prominence.

The four members of the Fantastic Four, who gained superpowers after exposure to cosmic rays during a scientific mission to outer space, are Mister Fantastic (Reed Richards), the group leader who can stretch his body into incredible lengths and shapes; the Invisible Woman (Susan "Sue" Storm-Richards; originally the Invisible Girl), Reed's girlfriend later wife, she can render herself or others invisible; the Human Torch (Johnny Storm), Sue's younger brother who can generate flames, surround himself with them and fly; and the monstrous Thing (Ben Grimm), a grumpy but benevolent friend who is a former college football star, Reed's college roommate and a skilled pilot. Thing has superhuman strength, durability, and endurance because of his stone-like flesh.

Since their 1961 introduction, the Fantastic Four has been portrayed as a somewhat dysfunctional, yet loving, family. Breaking convention with other comic archetypes, the members squabbled, held grudges both deep and petty, and eschewed anonymity or secret identities in favor of celebrity status. They are also well known for their roster of supporting characters, including allies H.E.R.B.I.E. and Alicia Masters; reformed adversaries the Silver Surfer and Namor; and villains such as Galactus, the Mole Man, Ronan the Accuser, Super-Skrull, Annihilus, and their archenemy, Doctor Doom.

The Fantastic Four has been adapted into other media, including several video games, animated series, and live-action films. The most prominent of these are Fantastic Four (2005), Fantastic Four: Rise of the Silver Surfer (2007), Fantastic Four (2015), and The Fantastic Four: First Steps (2025).

== Publication history ==
=== Origins ===
Longtime magazine and comic book publisher Martin Goodman, aware of the strong sales of Justice League of America, directed his comics editor, Stan Lee, to create a comic-book series about a team of superheroes. According to Lee, writing in 1974, "Martin mentioned that he had noticed one of the titles published by National Comics seemed to be selling better than most. It was a book called The [sic] Justice League of America and it was composed of a team of superheroes. ... 'If the Justice League is selling', spoke he, 'why don't we put out a comic book that features a team of superheroes?'"

Lee, who had served as editor-in-chief and art director of Marvel Comics and its predecessor companies, Timely Comics and Atlas Comics, for two decades, found that the medium had become creatively restrictive. Determined "to carve a real career for myself in the nowhere world of comic books", Lee concluded that, "For just this once, I would do the type of story I myself would enjoy reading ... And the characters would be the kind of characters I could personally relate to: They'd be flesh and blood, they'd have their faults and foibles, they'd be fallible and feisty, and — most important of all — inside their colorful, costumed booties they'd still have feet of clay."

Lee provided one of his earliest recorded comments on the creation of the Fantastic Four for a fanzine in 1968, during which time penciller Jack Kirby was also working at Marvel. (Kirby is interviewed separately in the same publication.) When asked who conceived the team, he or Kirby, Lee responded "Both ' 'twas mainly my idea, but Jack created characters visually". In the 1974 book Origins of Marvel Comics, Lee described the creative process in more detail, stating that he developed the basic characters as well as a story synopsis for Jack Kirby to follow in the first issue. Lee noted the involvement of both Kirby and Publisher Martin Goodman prior to preparing his synopsis: "After kicking it around with Martin and Jack for a while I decided to call our quaint quartet the Fantastic Four. I wrote a detailed first synopsis for Jack to follow and the rest is history." Kirby turned in his penciled art pages to Lee, who added dialogue and captions. This approach to creating comics, which became known as the "Marvel Method", worked so well that Lee and Kirby used it from then on, and the Marvel Method became standard for the company within a year.

Kirby recalled events somewhat differently. In a 1970 Fanzine interview he confirmed Lee's involvement in the creation of the Fantastic Four but took credit for the main characters and ideas, stating "It was my idea. It was my idea to do it the way it was; my idea to develop it the way it was. I'm not saying Stan had nothing to do with it. Of course he did. We talked things out." Years later, when specifically challenged with Lee's version of events in a 1990 interview, Kirby responded: "I would say that's an outright lie", although the interviewer, Gary Groth, notes that this statement needs to be viewed with caution. (Note: Groth explains in his 2002 introduction to the interview that Kirby's state of mind needs to be taken into consideration when evaluating certain statements within the interview. Kirby was involved in an acrimonious dispute with Marvel Comics regarding the return of his artwork, and his relationship with Lee had deteriorated, in part due to this dispute but also due to Lee's public statements through the years, which Kirby saw as diminishing his role. Groth states: "Lee's contribution is a matter for endless speculation, but most observers and historians consider Kirby's claims here to be excessive.") Kirby claims he came up with the idea for the Fantastic Four in Marvel's offices, and that Lee merely added the dialogue after the story was pencilled. Kirby also sought to establish, more credibly and on numerous occasions, that the visual elements of the strip were his conceptions. He regularly pointed to a team he illustrated and may have created for rival publisher DC Comics in the 1950s, the Challengers of the Unknown. "[I]f you notice the uniforms, they're the same ... I always give them a skintight uniform with a belt ... the Challengers and the FF have a minimum of decoration. And of course, the Thing's skin is a kind of decoration, breaking up the monotony of the blue uniform." However, the Fantastic Four wore civilian garb instead of uniforms, which were only introduced (along with the Baxter Building Headquarters) in the third issue of the series following readership feedback. The original submitted design was also modified to include the iconic chest insignia of a "4" within a circle that was designed by Lee.

Given the conflicting statements, outside commentators have found it hard to ascertain who created the Fantastic Four. A typed synopsis by Lee for the introductory segment of the first Fantastic Four issue exists and outlines the characters and their origins, with various minor differences to the published version. However Earl Wells, writing in The Comics Journal, points out that its existence does not assert its place in the creation: "[W]e have no way of knowing of whether Lee wrote the synopsis after a discussion with Kirby in which Kirby supplied most of the ideas".

The Fantastic Four's first adventure depicts a team of four adventurers (three men and a woman) led by a scientist travelling beneath the earth's surface and encountering giant monsters while contending with a human antagonist who is also from the surface world; this echoes plot elements of the 1959 film Journey to the Center of the Earth. While neither Lee nor Kirby ever mentioned the film as a direct inspiration, publisher Martin Goodman was known for following popular entertainment trends to attract sales in his comics line.

Comics historian R. C. Harvey believes the Fantastic Four was a continuation of the work Kirby previously did, and so "more likely Kirby's creations than Lee's". But Harvey notes that the Marvel Method of collaboration allowed each man to claim credit, and that Lee's dialogue added to the direction the team took. Wells argues that Lee's contributions set the framework within which Kirby worked, and this made Lee "more responsible". Comics historian Mark Evanier, a studio assistant to Jack Kirby in the 1970s, says that the considered opinion of Lee and Kirby's contemporaries was "that Fantastic Four was created by Stan and Jack. No further division of credit seemed appropriate."

=== 1960s and 1970s ===
The Fantastic Four #1 (Nov. 1961) was an unexpected success. Lee had felt ready to stop working on comics at the time, but the positive response to Fantastic Four persuaded him to continue with comic books. The title began to receive fan mail and Lee started printing the letters in a letter column with issue #3. Also with the third issue, Lee created the hyperbolic slogan "The Greatest Comic Magazine in the World!!" With the following issue, the slogan was changed to "The World's Greatest Comic Magazine!" and became a fixture on the issue covers into the 1990s, and on numerous covers in the 2000s.

Issue #4 (May 1962) reintroduced Namor the Sub-Mariner, an aquatic antihero who was a star character of Marvel's earliest iteration, Timely Comics, during the late 1930s and 1940s period that historians and fans call the Golden Age of Comics. Issue #5 (July 1962) introduced the team's most frequent nemesis, Doctor Doom. These earliest issues were published bimonthly. With issue #16 (July 1963), the cover title dropped its The and became simply Fantastic Four. In Fantastic Four #19 (October 1963), Stan Lee announced that Reed Richards would remain leader of the group, due to an overwhelming fan response in the affirmative (93.47%). Stan's comment of 'Nuff Said would from here become an ongoing phrase in Lee's communications with fans.

While the early stories were complete narratives, the frequent appearances of these two antagonists, Doom and Namor, in subsequent issues indicated the creation of a long narrative by Lee and Kirby that extended over months. According to comics historian Les Daniels, "only narratives that ran to several issues would be able to contain their increasingly complex ideas". During its creators' lengthy run, the series produced many acclaimed storylines and characters that have become central to Marvel, including the hidden race of alien-human genetic experiments, the Inhumans; the Black Panther, an African king who would be mainstream comics' first Black superhero; the rival alien races the Kree and the shapeshifting Skrulls; Him, who would become Adam Warlock; the Negative Zone and unstable molecules. The story frequently cited as Lee and Kirby's finest achievement is the three-part "Galactus Trilogy" that began in Fantastic Four #48 (March 1966), chronicling the arrival of Galactus, a cosmic giant who wanted to devour the planet, and his herald, the Silver Surfer. Fantastic Four #48 was chosen as #24 in the 100 Greatest Marvels of All Time poll of Marvel's readers in 2001. Editor Robert Greenberger wrote in his introduction to the story that, "As the fourth year of the Fantastic Four came to a close, Stan Lee and Jack Kirby seemed to be only warming up. In retrospect, it was perhaps the most fertile period of any monthly title during the Marvel Age." Daniels noted that "[t]he mystical and metaphysical elements that took over the saga were perfectly suited to the tastes of young readers in the 1960s", and Lee soon discovered that the story was a favorite on college campuses. The Fantastic Four Annual was used to spotlight several key events. The Sub-Mariner was crowned king of Atlantis in the first annual (1963). The following year's annual revealed the origin story of Doctor Doom. Fantastic Four Annual #3 (1965) presented the wedding of Reed Richards and Sue Storm. Lee and Kirby reintroduced the original Human Torch in Fantastic Four Annual #4 (1966) and had him battle Johnny Storm. The series introduced Black Panther in issues #52-53 (July–August 1966). Sue Richards' pregnancy was announced in Fantastic Four Annual #5 (1967), and the Richards' son, Franklin Richards was born in Fantastic Four Annual #6 (1968) in a story which introduced Annihilus as well.

Marvel filed for a trademark for "Fantastic Four" in 1967 and the United States Patent and Trademark Office issued the registration in 1970.

Kirby left Marvel in mid-1970, having drawn the first 102 issues plus an unfinished issue, partially published in Fantastic Four #108, with alterations, and later completed and published as Fantastic Four: The Lost Adventure (April 2008), Fantastic Four continued with Lee, Roy Thomas, Gerry Conway and Marv Wolfman as its consecutive regular writers, working with artists such as John Romita Sr., John Buscema, Rich Buckler and George Pérez, with longtime inker Joe Sinnott adding some visual continuity. Jim Steranko also contributed some covers during this time. A short-lived series starring the team, Giant-Size Super-Stars, began in May 1974 and changed its title to Giant-Size Fantastic Four with issue #2. The fourth issue introduced Jamie Madrox, a character who later became part of the X-Men. Giant-Size Fantastic Four was canceled with issue #6 (Oct. 1975). Roy Thomas and George Pérez crafted a metafictional story for Fantastic Four #176 (Nov. 1976) in which the Impossible Man visited the offices of Marvel Comics and met numerous comics creators. Marv Wolfman and Keith Pollard crafted a multi-issue storyline involving the son of Doctor Doom which culminated in issue #200 (Nov. 1978). John Byrne joined the title with issue #209 (Aug. 1979), doing pencil breakdowns for Sinnott to finish. He and Wolfman introduced a new herald for Galactus named Terrax the Tamer in #211 (Oct. 1979).

=== 1980s ===
Bill Mantlo briefly followed Wolfman as writer of the series and wrote a crossover with Peter Parker, The Spectacular Spider-Man #42 (May 1980). Byrne wrote and drew a giant-sized Fantastic Four promotional comic for Coca-Cola, which was rejected by Coca-Cola as being too violent and published as Fantastic Four #220–221 (July–Aug. 1980) instead. Writer Doug Moench and penciller Bill Sienkiewicz then took over for 10 issues. With issue #232 (July 1981), the aptly titled "Back to the Basics", Byrne began his run as writer, penciller and inker, the last under the pseudonym Bjorn Heyn for this issue only.

Byrne revitalized the slumping title with his run. Byrne was slated to write with Sienkiewicz providing the art however, Sienkiewicz left to do Moon Knight, and Byrne subsequently became writer, artist, and inker. Various editors were assigned to the comic; eventually Bob Budiansky became the regular editor. Byrne told Jim Shooter that he could not work with Budiansky, although they ultimately continued to work together. In 2006, Byrne said "that's my paranoia. I look back and I think that was Shooter trying to force me off the book". Byrne left following issue #293 (Aug. 1986) in the middle of a story arc, explaining he could not recapture the fun he had previously had on the series. One of Byrne's changes was making the Invisible Girl into the Invisible Woman: assertive and confident. During this period, fans came to recognize that she was quite powerful, whereas previously, she had been primarily seen as a superpowered mother and wife in the tradition of television moms like those played by Donna Reed and Florence Henderson.

Byrne staked new directions in the characters' personal lives, having the married Sue Storm and Reed Richards suffer a miscarriage and the Thing quitting the Fantastic Four, with She-Hulk being recruited as his long-term replacement. He also re-emphasized the family dynamic which he felt the series had drifted away from after the Lee/Kirby run, commenting that, "Family—and not dysfunctional family—is the central, key element to the FF. It is an absolutely vital dynamic between the characters." [emphases in original]

Byrne was followed by a quick succession of writers: Roger Stern, Tom DeFalco, and Roy Thomas. Steve Englehart took over as writer for issues 304–332 (except #320). The title had been struggling, so Englehart decided to make radical changes. He felt the title had become stale with the normal makeup of Reed, Sue, Ben, and Johnny, so in issue #308 Reed and Sue retired and were replaced with the Thing's new girlfriend, Sharon Ventura, and Johnny Storm's former love, Crystal. The changes increased readership through issue #321. At this point, Marvel made decisions about another Englehart comic, West Coast Avengers, that he disagreed with, and in protest he changed his byline to S.F.X. Englehart (S.F.X. is an abbreviation for Sound Effects). As of issue #326, Englehart was told to bring Reed and Sue back and undo the other changes he had made. This caused Englehart to take his name entirely off the book. He used the pseudonym John Harkness, which he had created years before for work he didn't want to be associated with. According to Englehart, the run from #326 through his last issue, #332, was "one of the most painful stretches of [his] career."

=== 1990s ===
Writer-artist Walt Simonson took over as writer with #334 (December 1989), and three issues later began pencilling and inking as well. With brief inking exceptions, two fill-in issues, and a three-issue stint drawn by Arthur Adams, Simonson remained in all three positions through #354 (July 1991).

Simonson, who had been writing the team comic The Avengers, had gotten approval for Reed and Sue to join that team after Englehart had written them out of Fantastic Four. Yet by The Avengers #300, where they were scheduled to join the team, Simonson was told the characters were returning to Fantastic Four. This led to Simonson quitting The Avengers after that issue. Shortly afterward, he was offered the job of writing Fantastic Four. Having already prepared a number of stories involving the Avengers with Reed and Sue in the lineup, he then rewrote these for Fantastic Four. Simonson later recalled that working on Fantastic Four allowed him the latitude to use original Avengers members Thor and Iron Man, which he had been precluded from using in The Avengers.

After another fill-in, the regular team of writer and Marvel editor-in-chief Tom DeFalco, penciller Paul Ryan and inker Dan Bulanadi took over, with Ryan self-inking beginning with #360 (Jan. 1992). That team, with the very occasional different inker, continued for years through #414 (July 1996). DeFalco nullified the Storm-Masters marriage by retconning that the alien Skrull Empire had kidnapped the real Masters and replaced her with a spy named Lyja. Once discovered, Lyja, who herself had fallen for Storm, helped the Fantastic Four rescue Masters. Ventura departed after being further mutated by Doctor Doom. Although some fans were not pleased with DeFalco's run on Fantastic Four, calling him "The Great Satan", the title's sales rose steadily over the period.

Other key developments included Franklin Richards being sent into the future and returning as a teenager; the return of Reed's time-traveling father, Nathaniel, who is revealed to be the father of time-travelling villain Kang the Conqueror and Reed's apparent death at the hands of a seemingly mortally wounded Doctor Doom. It would be two years before DeFalco resurrected the two characters, revealing that their "deaths" were orchestrated by the supervillain Hyperstorm.

The ongoing series was canceled with issue #416 (Sept. 1996) and relaunched with vol. 2 #1 (Nov. 1996) as part of the multi-series "Heroes Reborn" crossover story arc. The yearlong volume retold the team's first adventures in a more contemporary style, and set in a parallel universe. Following the end of that experiment, Fantastic Four was relaunched with vol. 3 #1 (Jan. 1998). Initially by the team of writer Scott Lobdell and penciller Alan Davis, it went after three issues to writer Chris Claremont (co-writing with Lobdell for #4–5) and penciller Salvador Larroca; this team enjoyed a long run through issue #32 (Aug. 2000).

=== 2000s ===
Following the run of Claremont, Lobdell and Larroca, Carlos Pacheco took over as penciller and co-writer, first with Rafael Marín, then with Marín and Jeph Loeb. This series began using dual numbering, as if the original Fantastic Four series had continued unbroken, with issue #42 / #471 (June 2001). At the time, the Marvel Comics series begun in the 1960s, such as Thor and The Amazing Spider-Man, were given such dual numbering on the front cover, with the present-day volume's numbering alongside the numbering from the original series. After issue #70 / #499 (Aug. 2003), the title reverted to its original vol. 1 numbering with issue #500 (Sept. 2003).

Karl Kesel succeeded Loeb as co-writer with issue #51 / #480 (March 2002), and after a few issues with temporary teams, Mark Waid took over as writer with #60 / 489 (October 2002) with artist Mike Wieringo with Marvel releasing a promotional variant edition of their otherwise $2.25 debut issue at the price of nine cents US. Pencillers Mark Buckingham, Casey Jones, and Howard Porter variously contributed through issue #524 (May 2005), with a handful of issues by other teams also during this time. Writer J. Michael Straczynski and penciller Mike McKone did issues #527–541 (July 2005 – Nov. 2006), with Dwayne McDuffie taking over as writer the following issue, and Paul Pelletier succeeding McKone beginning with #544 (May 2007).

As a result of the events of the "Civil War" company-crossover storyline, the Black Panther and Storm temporarily replaced Reed and Susan Richards on the team. During that period, the Fantastic Four also appeared in Black Panther, written by Reginald Hudlin and pencilled primarily by Francis Portela. Beginning with issue #554 (April 2008), writer Mark Millar and penciller Bryan Hitch began what Marvel announced as a sixteen-issue run. Following the summer 2008 crossover storyline, "Secret Invasion", and the 2009 aftermath "Dark Reign", chronicling the U.S. government's assigning of the Nation's security functions to the seemingly reformed supervillain Norman Osborn, the Fantastic Four starred in a five-issue miniseries, Dark Reign: Fantastic Four (May–Sept. 2009), written by Jonathan Hickman, with art by Sean Chen. Hickman took over as the series regular writer as of issue #570 with Dale Eaglesham and later Steve Epting on art.

=== 2010s and 2020s ===
In the storyline "Three", which concluded in Fantastic Four #587 (cover date March 2011, published January 26, 2011), the Human Torch appears to die stopping a horde of monsters from the other-dimensional Negative Zone. The series ended with the following issue, #588, and relaunched in March 2011 as simply FF. The relaunch saw the team assume a new name, the Future Foundation, adopt new black-and-white costumes, and accept longtime ally Spider-Man as a member. In October 2011, with the publication of FF #11 (cover-dated Dec. 2011), the Fantastic Four series reached its 599th issue.

In November 2011, to commemorate the 50th anniversary of the Fantastic Four and of Marvel Comics, the company published the 100-page Fantastic Four #600 (cover-dated Jan. 2012), which returned the title to its original numbering and featured the return of the Human Torch. It revealed the fate of the character of Johnny Storm after issue #587, showing that while he did in fact die, he was resurrected to fight as a gladiator for the entertainment of Annihilus. Storm later formed a resistance force called Light Brigade and defeated Annihilus.

Although it was launched as a continuation of the Fantastic Four title, FF continues publication as a separate series. Starting with issue #12, the title focuses upon the youthful members of the Future Foundation, including Franklin and Valeria Richards.

In the graphic novel Fantastic Four: Season One, the Fantastic Four is given an updated origin story set in the present day instead of the 1960s. The hardcover compilation debuted at number four on The New York Times Best Seller list for graphic novels.

As part of Marvel NOW! Fantastic Four ended with #611, ending Jonathan Hickman's long run on FF titles, and the title was relaunched in November 2012 with the creative team of writer Matt Fraction and artist Mark Bagley. In the new title with its numbering starting at #1, the entire Fantastic Four family explore space together, with the hidden intent for Reed Richards to discover why his powers are fading.

Writer James Robinson and artist Leonard Kirk launched a new Fantastic Four series in February 2014 (cover dated April 2014).

Robinson later confirmed that Fantastic Four would be cancelled in 2015 with issue #645, saying that "The book is reverting to its original numbers, and the book is going away for a while. I'm moving towards the end of Fantastic Four. I just want to reassure people that you will not leave this book with a bad taste in your mouth." In the aftermath of the "Secret Wars" storyline, the Thing is working with the Guardians of the Galaxy and the Human Torch is acting as an ambassador with the Inhumans. With Franklin's powers restored and Reed having absorbed the power of the Beyonders from Doom, the Richards family is working on travelling through and reconstructing the multiverse, but Peter Parker has purchased the Baxter Building to keep it "safe" until the team is ready to come back together.

A new volume for the Fantastic Four was released in August 2018, written by Dan Slott, as part of Marvel's Fresh Start event. The first issue of the new series was met with strong sales, and a positive critical reaction. When the Future Foundation is threatened by the Griever at the End of All Things, Mister Fantastic plays on her ego to convince her to provide him with equipment that will allow him to summon his teammates. When Human Torch and Thing are reunited with Mister Fantastic and Invisible Woman, the other superheroes that were part of the Fantastic Four at some point in their lives also arrived, including, unexpectedly, X-Men's Iceman. With the gathered heroes assisted the Fantastic Four into causing so much damage to the Griever's equipment, she is forced to retreat in her final telepod or be trapped in that universe. This left the heroes to salvage components from the broken ship to create their own teleport system to return to their universe. The Fantastic Four and their extended family returned to Earth where they find that Liberteens members Ms. America, 2-D, Hope, and Iceberg have come together as the Fantastix with Ms. America taking the codename of Ms. Fantastix. Following the staged bank robbery that the Wrecking Crew committed and their involvement of being hired to humiliate the Fantastix in public, the Fantastic Four gave the Fantastix their blessing to continue using the Baxter Building while the FF operate in a house on Yancy Street with a dimensionally-transcendental interior.

In the storyline Point of Origin, the Fantastic Four entrust Alicia, H.E.R.B.I.E., Franklin and Valeria to protect Earth while they begin their mission to learn a further origin of the cosmic radiation that granted them their powers in the first place, piloting a new space ship called Marvel-2. While in the middle of a space adventure to find the origin, the Fantastic Four are attacked by a group who believed themselves to be the superheroes of Planet Spyre, the Unparalleled. Reed and Sue are separated from the Thing, Human Torch is revealed to be the soulmate of the Unparalleled member named Sky, and they learn that the Unparalleled's leader and the Overseer of Planet Spyre, Revos, was responsible for the cosmic rays that struck the team on their original trip, as he wanted to stop them coming to his planet. Revos subsequently mutated his people to "prepare for their return" before trying to eradicate the mutates (Note: In Marvel comics, the term "mutate" is used as a noun to designate characters that received superpowers from an external source, as opposed to Marvel's mutants.) who are unable to retain their original forms in the same manner as the Thing, accusing the mutates of being "villains and imperfects"; as a result, through his own paranoia and xenophobia, the Overseer himself is responsible for the fateful creation of the Fantastic Four and mutated his entire race to face a non-existent threat. Revos challenges Mr. Fantastic to a fight over their differences, until it is settled and they finally made peace. As the Fantastic Four are about to depart Spyre after helping its citizens clean up the Planet (as well as Reed providing the mutates with a variation of the temporary 'cure' he has created for Ben), Skye join them to learn about Earth and every unseen galaxy. When the incoming Kree-Skrull Empyre occur at the same time as teen heroes are being outlawed, the original Fantastic Four went to space with Avengers to stop this Empyre, leaving Franklin and Valeria being backed by Spider-Man and Wolverine to defend Earth.

In August 2022, Marvel announced that writer Ryan North and artist Iban Coello would launch a new volume of Fantastic Four in November of that year after Slott had concluded his run on the title with issue #46.

== Spin-offs ==
Ancillary titles and features spinoff from the flagship series include the 1970s quarterly Giant-Size Fantastic Four and the 1990s Fantastic Four Unlimited and Fantastic Four Unplugged; Fantastic Force, an 18-issue spinoff (November. 1994–April. 1996) featuring a young adult Franklin Richards, from a different timeline, as Psi-Lord. A 12-issue series Fantastic Four: The World's Greatest Comics Magazine ran in 2001, paying homage to Stan Lee and Jack Kirby's legendary run. A spinoff title Marvel Knights 4 (April 2004-August 2006) was written by Roberto Aguirre-Sacasa and initially illustrated by Steve McNiven in his first Marvel work. There have also been numerous limited series featuring the group.

In 1996, Marvel launched the series Fantastic Four 2099, part of the company's Marvel 2099 imprint which explored an alternate future of the Marvel Universe. The four protagonists inexplicably find themselves in 2099, with the world believing them to be clones of the original members of the Fantastic Four. The series ran for 8 issues (Jan.–Aug. 1996), serving as a companion to Doom 2099—an original Marvel 2099 title featuring an individual claiming to be the original Victor von Doom. In 2021, the series was brought back for a single issue.

In 2004, Marvel launched Ultimate Fantastic Four. As part of the company's Ultimate Marvel imprint, the series re-imagined the team as young adults. It ran for 60 issues (Feb. 2004–Feb. 2009). The issues were repackaged into four-issue graphic novel volumes. The characters continued to appear in other Ultimate Marvel franchises, including Ultimatum. Ultimate Reed Richards became a mainstay of both the Earth-1610 and Earth-616 continuities as the villain the Maker. In 2008, they also launched Marvel Adventures: Fantastic Four, an out-of-continuity series aimed at younger readers.

Although it was launched by Marvel as a continuation of the Fantastic Four title in 2011, FF continued publication as a separate series after the regular series resumed in 2012. From issues #12, the title focused on the youthful members of the Future Foundation, including Franklin and Valeria Richards. A second volume was launched as part of Marvel NOW! by Matt Fraction and Mike Allred depicting a substitute Fantastic Four team starring Scott Lang, Medusa, She-Hulk and Ms. Thing.

=== Solo series ===
==== The Human Torch solo ====
The Human Torch was given a solo strip in Strange Tales in 1962 to bolster the title's sales. The series began in Strange Tales #101 (October 1962), in 12- to 14-page stories plotted by Lee and initially scripted by his brother Larry Lieber, and drawn by penciller Kirby and inker Dick Ayers.

Here, Johnny was seen living with his older sister, Susan, in fictional Glenview, Long Island, New York, where he continued high school and, with youthful naiveté, attempted to maintain a "secret identity". In Strange Tales #106 (March 1963), Johnny discovered that his friends and neighbors knew of his dual identity all along from Fantastic Four news reports, but were humoring him. Supporting characters included Johnny's girlfriend, Doris Evans, usually in consternation as Johnny cheerfully flew off to battle bad guys. She was seen again in a 1973 issue of Fantastic Four, having become a heavyset but cheerful wife and mother. Ayers took over the penciling after ten issues, later followed by original Golden Age Human Torch creator Carl Burgos and others. The Fantastic Four made occasional cameo appearances, and the Thing became a co-star with issue #123 (Aug. 1964).

The Human Torch shared the split book Strange Tales with fellow feature Doctor Strange for the majority of its run, before being replaced in issue #135 (August 1965) by Nick Fury, Agent of S.H.I.E.L.D. The Silver Age stories were republished in 1974, along with some Golden Age Human Torch stories, in a short-lived ongoing Human Torch series.

A later ongoing solo series in Marvel's manga-influenced Tsunami imprint, Human Torch, ran 12 issues (June 2003 – June 2004), by writer Karl Kesel and penciler Skottie Young. The series was followed by the five-issue limited series Spider-Man/Human Torch (March–July 2005), an untold tales team-up arc spanning the course of their friendship.

==== The Thing solo ====
The Thing appeared in two team-up issues of Marvel Feature (#11–12, September–November 1973). Following their success, he was given his own regular team-up title Marvel Two-in-One, co-starring with Marvel heroes not only in the present day but occasionally in other time periods (fighting alongside the World War II-era Liberty Legion in #20 and the 1930s hero Doc Savage in #21, for example) and in alternate realities. The series ran 100 issues (January 1974 – June 1983), with seven summer annuals (1976–1982) and was immediately followed by the solo title The Thing #1–36 (July 1983 – June 1986). Another ongoing solo series, also titled The Thing, ran eight issues (January–August 2006).

A six issue miniseries written by Walter Mosley, entitled The Thing, was released in November 2021.

==== Invisible Woman solo ====
In April 2019, Marvel Comics announced that it would publish Invisible Woman, a five-issue miniseries written by Mark Waid and drawn by artist Mattia De Lulis. This was Sue Storm's first solo title. Adam Hughes drew the cover for all five issues.

== Characters ==
The Fantastic Four is formed after four civilian astronauts are exposed to cosmic rays during an unauthorized outer space test flight in an experimental rocket ship designed by Dr. Reed Richards. Pilot Ben Grimm and crew-members Susan Storm and her brother Johnny Storm survive an emergency crash-landing in a field on Earth. Upon exiting the rocket, the four discover they have developed incredible superpowers and decide to use these powers to help others.

In the first issue the crew talks about Reed Richards' rocketship flying to the stars. Stan Lee's original synopsis described the crew's plan to fly to Mars, but Lee later shortly afterward wrote that due to "the rate the Communists are progressing in space, maybe we better make this a flight to the STARS, instead of just to Mars, because by the time this mag goes on sale, the Russians may have already MADE a flight to Mars!"

In a significant departure from preceding superhero conventions, the Fantastic Four make no effort to maintain secret identities or, until issue #3, to wear superhero costumes, instead maintaining a public profile and enjoying celebrity status for scientific and heroic contributions to society. At the same time, they are often prone to arguing and even fighting with one another. Despite their bickering, the Fantastic Four consistently prove themselves to be "a cohesive and formidable team in times of crisis."

While there have been a number of lineup changes to the group, the four characters who debuted in Fantastic Four #1 remain the core and most frequent lineup. They consist of:

- Mister Fantastic (Reed Richards) – A scientific genius, can stretch, twist and re-shape his body to inhuman proportions. Mr. Fantastic serves as the father figure of the group, and is "appropriately pragmatic, authoritative, and dull". Richards blames himself for the failed space mission, particularly because of how the event transformed pilot Ben Grimm. Stan Lee stated that the character's stretching powers were inspired by DC's Plastic Man, which had no equivalent in Marvel.
- Invisible Girl/Invisible Woman (Susan Storm) - Reed Richards' girlfriend (and eventual wife) has the ability to bend and manipulate light to render herself and others invisible. Stan Lee did not want Sue to have superstrength, "to be Wonder Woman and punch people", so eventually he came to invisibility, inspired by works such as The Invisible Man. She later develops the ability to generate invisible force fields, which she uses for a variety of defensive and offensive effects.
- Human Torch (Johnny Storm) – Sue Storm's younger brother, possesses the ability to control fire, allowing him to project fire from his body, as well as the power to fly. This character was loosely based on a Human Torch character published by Marvel's predecessor Timely Comics in the 1940s, an android that could ignite itself. Lee said that when he conceptualized the character, "I thought it was a shame that we didn't have The Human Torch anymore, and this was a good chance to bring him back". Unlike the teen sidekicks that preceded him, the Human Torch in the early stories was "a typical adolescent — brash, rebellious, and affectionately obnoxious." Johnny Storm was killed in the 2011 storyline "Three", before being brought back and rejoining the reformed Fantastic Four.
- Thing (Ben Grimm) – Reed Richards' college roommate and best friend, has been transformed into a monstrous, orange, rock-like humanoid possessing high levels of superhuman strength and durability. The Thing is often filled with anger, self-loathing and self-pity over his new existence. He serves as "an uncle figure, a long-term friend of the family with a gruff Brooklyn manner, short temper, and caustic sense of humor". In the original synopsis Lee gave to Kirby, The Thing was intended as "the heavy", but over the years, the character has become "the most lovable group member: honest, direct and free of pretension". Lee said his original pitch to Kirby stated that The Thing was "someone who turned into a monster" and is bitter because unlike the other three he cannot change back to a normal appearance.

The Fantastic Four has had several headquarters, most notably the Baxter Building, located at 42nd Street and Madison Avenue in New York City. The Baxter Building was replaced by Four Freedoms Plaza at the same location after its destruction at the hands of Kristoff Vernard, adopted son of Doctor Doom. During the construction of the plaza, the team took up temporary residence at Avengers Mansion. Pier 4, a waterfront warehouse, served as a temporary headquarters after Four Freedoms Plaza was destroyed by the ostensible superhero team the Thunderbolts shortly after the revelation that they were the supervillain team the Masters of Evil in disguise. Pier 4 was eventually destroyed during a battle with Diablo, after which the team received a new Baxter Building, courtesy of one of team leader Reed Richards' former professors, Noah Baxter. This second Baxter Building was constructed in Earth's orbit and teleported into the vacant lot formerly occupied by the original. After their brief hiatus creating universes after the events of "Secret Wars", the Fantastic Four took residence on 4 Yancy Street before moving back into the newly rebuilt Baxter Building.

=== Other members ===
Character	Name	Joined in
Crystal	Crystallia Amaquelin	Fantastic Four #81 (December 1968)
Medusa	Medusalith Amaquelin	Fantastic Four #132 (March 1973)
Luke Cage	Lukas Cage (born Carl Lucas)	Fantastic Four #168 (March 1976)
Nova	Frankie Raye	Fantastic Four #238 (January 1982)
She-Hulk	Jennifer "Jen" Susan Walters	Fantastic Four #265 (January 1984)
Ms. Marvel / She-Thing	Sharon Ventura	Fantastic Four #306 (September 1987)
Ant-Man	Scott Edward Harris Lang	Fantastic Four #384 (January 1994)
Lyja	Lyja	Fantastic Four #403 (August 1995)
Namorita	Namorita "Nita" Prentiss	Fantastic Four, vol. 3 #43 (July 2001)
Storm	Ororo Munroe	Fantastic Four #543 (March 2007)
Black Panther	T'Challa	Fantastic Four #543 (March 2007)
Powerhouse	Franklin Benjamin Richards	Secret Invasion: Fantastic Four #3 (July 2008)
Brainstorm	Valeria Meghan Richards	Secret Invasion: Fantastic Four #3 (July 2008)
Flux	Dennis Sykes	Heroic Age: One Month to Live #3 (September 2010)
Spider-Man	Peter Benjamin Parker	Amazing Spider-Man #657 (March 2011) or FF #1 (March 2011)
Ms. Thing	Darla Deering	Fantastic Four vol. 4 #2 (December 2012)
Moon Girl	Lunella Lafayette	Moon Girl and Devil Dinosaur #29 (March 2018)
Devil Dinosaur		Moon Girl and Devil Dinosaur #29 (March 2018)
Iceman	Robert "Bobby" Louis Drake	Fantastic Four vol. 6 #3 (November 2018)
Jack of Hearts	Jonathan "Jack" Hart	Fantastic Four vol. 6 #40 (February 2022)

==== New Fantastic Four ====
New Fantastic Four was formed to fill Fantastic Four after they were believed to have perished.

Character	Name	Joined in
Hulk	Robert Bruce Banner	Fantastic Four #347 (December 1990)
Ghost Rider	Daniel "Danny" Ketch	Fantastic Four #347 (December 1990)
Spider-Man	Peter Benjamin Parker	Fantastic Four #347 (December 1990)
Wolverine	James "Logan" Howlett	Fantastic Four #347 (December 1990)
Sleepwalker		Spider-Man #22 (May 1992)
Powerhouse	Franklin Benjamin Richards	Fantastic Four, vol. 6 #22 (August 2020)
Brainstorm	Valeria Meghan Richards	Fantastic Four, vol. 6 #22 (August 2020)

== Supporting characters ==
=== Allies and supporting characters ===
A number of characters are closely affiliated with the team, share complex personal histories with one or more of its members but have never actually held an official membership. Some of these characters include, but are not limited to: Namor the Sub-Mariner (previously an antagonist), Alicia Masters, Lyja the Lazerfist, H.E.R.B.I.E., Kristoff Vernard (Doctor Doom's former protégé), Wyatt Wingfoot, Sue and Johnny's father Franklin Storm, the receptionist android Roberta, governess Agatha Harkness, and Reed and Sue's children Franklin Richards and Valeria Richards.

Several allies of the Fantastic Four have served as temporary members of the team, including Crystal, Medusa, Power Man (Luke Cage), Nova (Frankie Raye), She-Hulk, Ms. Marvel (Sharon Ventura), Ant-Man (Scott Lang), Namorita, Storm, and the Black Panther. A temporary lineup from Fantastic Four #347–349 (December 1990 – February 1991) consisted of the Hulk (in his "Joe Fixit" persona), Spider-Man, Wolverine, and Ghost Rider.

Other notable characters who have been involved with the Fantastic Four include Alyssa Moy, Caledonia (Alysande Stuart of Earth-9809), Fantastic Force, the Inhumans (particularly the royal family members Black Bolt, Crystal, Medusa, Gorgon, Karnak, Triton, and Lockjaw), Reed's father Nathaniel Richards, the Silver Surfer (previously an antagonist), Franklin's teleporting pet Puppy, Thundra, postal worker Willie Lumpkin, Baxter Building landlord Walter Collins, the Thing's rivals the Yancy Street Gang and Uatu the Watcher.

Author Christopher Knowles states that Kirby's work on creations featured in the Fantastic Four comics such as the Inhumans and the Black Panther served as "a showcase of some of the most radical concepts in the history of the medium".

=== Antagonists ===
Writers and artists over many years have created a variety of characters to challenge the Fantastic Four. Knowles states that Kirby helped to create "an army of villains whose rage and destructive power had never been seen before," and "whose primary impulse is to smash the world." Some of the team's oldest and most frequent enemies have involved such foes as the Mole Man, the Skrulls, Namor the Sub-Mariner, Galactus, Doctor Doom, the Puppet Master, Kang the Conqueror, Blastaar, the Frightful Four, Annihilus, and Klaw. Other prominent antagonists of the Fantastic Four have included the Wizard, the Impossible Man, the Red Ghost and the Super-Apes, the Mad Thinker, the Super-Skrull, the Molecule Man, Diablo, Dragon Man, Psycho-Man, Ronan the Accuser, Salem's Seven, Terrax, Terminus, Hyperstorm, and Lucia von Bardas.

== Cultural impact and legacy ==
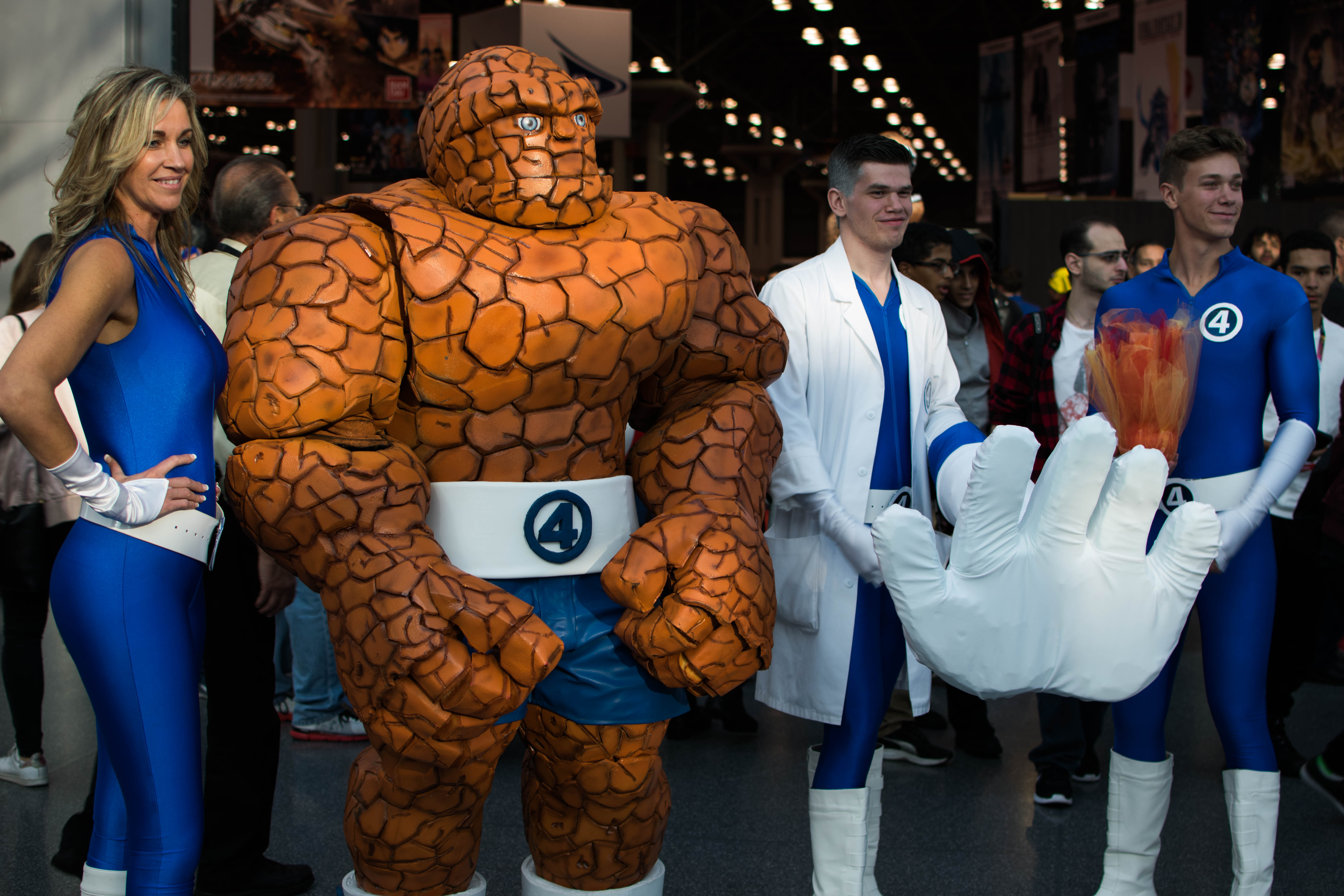
Fantastic Four cosplay at the 2016 New York Comic Con

=== Critical reception ===
Abraham Riesman of Vulture included the Fantastic Four in their "12 Teams That Defined Superhero Storytelling" list. Laura Bradley of Vanity Fair included the Fantastic Four in their "Stan Lee's Most Iconic Characters" list. CBR.com ranked the Fantastic Four 1st in their "10 Most Fashionable Teams In Marvel Comics" list, 3rd in their "Every Marvel Superhero Team" list, and 5th in their "Marvel: The 10 Strongest Superhero Teams" list. Brooke Wright of MovieWeb ranked the Fantastic Four 2nd in their "Most Famous Superhero Families" list. Jason Serafino of Complex ranked the Fantastic Four 3rd in their "10 Best Superhero Teams In Comics" list. Michael Doran of Newsarama ranked the Fantastic Four 4th in their "Best superhero teams of all time" list. Geoff Boucher of Deadline ranked the Fantastic Four 9th in their "Stan Lee's Legacy: Ranking The Hollywood Heroes Co-Created By The Marvel Comics Icon" list. Chris Isaac of Screen Rant ranked the Fantastic Four 15th in their "15 Best Superhero Teams Of All Time" list.

=== Impact ===
The Fantastic Four's characterization was initially different from all other superheroes at the time. One major difference is that they do not conceal their identities, leading the public to be both suspicious and in awe of them. Also, they frequently argued and disagreed with each other, hindering their work as a team. Described as "heroes with hangups" by Stan Lee, the Thing has a temper, and the Human Torch resents being a child among adults. Mr. Fantastic blames himself for the Thing's transformation. Social scientist Bradford W. Wright describes the team as a "volatile mix of human emotions and personalities." In spite of their disagreements, they ultimately function well as a team.

The first issue of The Fantastic Four proved a success, igniting a new direction for superhero comics and soon influencing many other superhero comics. Readers grew fond of Ben's grumpiness, Johnny's tendency to annoy others and Reed and Sue's spats. Stan Lee was surprised at the reaction to the first issue, leading him to stay in the comics field despite previous plans to leave. Comics historian Stephen Krensky said that "Lee's natural dialogue and flawed characters appealed to 1960s kids looking to 'get real.'"

In 2022, Penguin Books released a Penguin Classics edition of the first handful of Lee/Kirby issues, as part of a line of Penguin branding of various Marvel characters.

==== Sales ====
As of 2005, more than 150 million Fantastic Four comic books have been sold. In 2022, the first issue of The Fantastic Four was sold for 1.5 million dollars at an auction. The highest-graded (9.6) copy of "Fantastic Four #1" auctioned by Heritage Auctions in 2024 was sold for a record $2.04 million.

== In other media ==
There have been four The Fantastic Four animated series and four released feature films. The Fantastic Four also guest-starred in the "Secret Wars" story arc of the 1990s Spider-Man animated series, and the Thing guest-starred (with a small cameo from the other Fantastic Four members) in the "Fantastic Fortitude" episode of the 1996 The Incredible Hulk series. The Fantastic Four also appeared in the 2010 series The Avengers: Earth's Mightiest Heroes.

There was a short-lived radio show in 1975 that adapted early Lee/Kirby stories and is notable for casting a pre-Saturday Night Live Bill Murray as the Human Torch. Also in the cast were Bob Maxwell as Reed Richards, Cynthia Adler as Sue Storm, Jim Pappas as Ben Grimm and Jerry Terheyden as Doctor Doom. Other Marvel characters featured in the series included Ant-Man, Namor, Nick Fury and the Hulk. Stan Lee narrated the series and the scripts were taken almost verbatim from the comic books. The radio show was packaged into five-minute segments, with five segments comprising a complete adventure. The team appeared on the Power Records album Fantastic Four: "The Way It Began" book and record set, an audio dramatization of Fantastic Four #126. The team also appears in Fantastic Four #1, an audio dramatization produced by Golden Records adapting the eponymous issue released in 1966.

The Fantastic Four also make an appearance in the BBC radio drama adaptation of The Amazing Spider Man.

The Fantastic Four appear in GraphicAudio's dramatized adaptation of Greg Cox's Fantastic Four: War Zone.

=== Television ===
The Fantastic Four has been the subject of four animated television series. The first, The Fantastic Four, produced by Hanna-Barbera, ran 20 episodes on ABC from September 9, 1967 to September 21, 1968.

The second Fantastic Four series, produced by DePatie-Freleng, ran 13 episodes from September 9, 1978, to December 16, 1978; this series features the robot H.E.R.B.I.E. in place of the Human Torch.

In 1979, the Thing was featured as half of the Saturday morning cartoon Fred and Barney Meet the Thing. The character of the Thing received a radical make-over for the series. The title character for this program was Benjy Grimm, a teenage boy who possessed a pair of magic Thing-rings which could transform him into the Thing when he put them together and said "Thing-rings, do your thing!". The other members of the Fantastic Four do not appear in the series, nor do the animated The Flintstones stars Fred Flintstone and Barney Rubble, despite the title of the program.

The third Fantastic Four was broadcast as part of The Marvel Action Hour umbrella, with introductions by Stan Lee. This series ran 26 episodes from September 24, 1994 to February 24, 1996.

The fourth series, Fantastic Four: World's Greatest Heroes, debuted on September 2, 2006, on Cartoon Network and ran for 26 episodes.

Different Fantastic Four members appear briefly and with little or no dialogue and are mentioned various times throughout the first season of The Avengers: Earth's Mightiest Heroes. Their most prominent appearances are in the episode "The Private War of Doctor Doom", in which the Avengers team up with the Fantastic Four to battle the titular supervillain, and in the final episode of season two, in which the groups team up to battle Galactus. The Thing becomes a member of the New Avengers in the episode "New Avengers".

The Fantastic Four make several appearances in The Super Hero Squad Show, including the episodes "If this Be My Thanos!" and "Last Exit Before Doomsday!".

The Fantastic Four appear in the Hulk and the Agents of S.M.A.S.H. episode "Monster No More", where the Agents of S.M.A.S.H. assist them in thwarting the Tribbitite invasion.

=== Film ===
A film adaptation of the characters, The Fantastic Four, was completed in 1994 by producer Roger Corman and stars Alex Hyde-White as Reed Richards / Mr. Fantastic, Rebecca Staab as Sue Storm-Richards / Invisible Woman, Jay Underwood as Johnny Storm / Human Torch, Michael Bailey Smith as Ben Grimm, Carl Ciarfalio as The Thing and Joseph Culp as Victor von Doom / Doctor Doom. The film was made to allow Constantin Film to keep the film rights to the characters, and therefore was not publicly released, though it has since been made available through bootleg video distributors. According to producer Bernd Eichinger, Avi Arad had Marvel purchase the film for a few million dollars.

In 2005, the second film adaptation, Fantastic Four directed by Tim Story, was released by 20th Century Fox. Despite mixed reviews from critics, it earned US$155 million in North America and $330 million worldwide. The sequel, Fantastic Four: Rise of the Silver Surfer, directed by Story and written by Don Payne, was released in 2007. Despite mixed-to-negative reviews, the sequel earned $132 million in North America and a total of $330.6 million worldwide. Both films feature Ioan Gruffudd as Reed Richards / Mr. Fantastic, Jessica Alba as Susan Storm / Invisible Woman, Chris Evans as Johnny Storm / Human Torch, Michael Chiklis as Ben Grimm / The Thing, and Julian McMahon as Victor Von Doom / Dr. Doom. Stan Lee makes cameo appearances as the mailman Willie Lumpkin in the first film and as himself in the second film.

A reboot directed by Josh Trank (also titled Fantastic Four, but stylized as Fant4stic) was released on August 7, 2015. The film stars Miles Teller as Reed Richards, Kate Mara as Sue Storm, Michael B. Jordan as Johnny Storm, Jamie Bell as Ben Grimm and Toby Kebbell as Doctor Doom. It is based on Ultimate Fantastic Four. It earned poor reviews and box office results. On March 20, 2019, due to the acquisition of 21st Century Fox by Disney, the film rights of Fantastic Four reverted to Marvel Studios.

In July 2019 at San Diego Comic-Con, producer and head of Marvel Studios Kevin Feige, announced that a Fantastic Four film set within the Marvel Cinematic Universe, later titled The Fantastic Four: First Steps, is in development. In December 2020, it was announced Jon Watts will direct the film, but he left the project for personal reasons in April 2022. On September 10, 2022 at the D23 Expo, Kevin Feige revealed director Matt Shakman would be taking over the film, with a release date of November 8, 2024. On September 21, 2022, Jeff Kaplan and Ian Springer were announced to be writers for the film. By March 2023, Josh Friedman was hired to rewrite the script. In February 2024, Pedro Pascal, Vanessa Kirby, Joseph Quinn and Ebon Moss-Bachrach were officially announced as Reed Richards, Sue Storm, Johnny Storm and Ben Grimm. The Fantastic Four: First Steps was released in the United States on July 25, 2025.

A livestream released on March 25, 2025, by Marvel Entertainment via their YouTube Channel announced several cast members for the upcoming film Avengers: Doomsday, including the announcement that Pascal, Kirby, Quinn and Moss-Bachrach would all be returning as their Fantastic Four characters for that film. Avengers: Doomsday is currently set to be released on December 18, 2026, in the United States.

=== Video games ===
In 1985, the Fantastic Four starred in Questprobe #3 The Fantastic Four, an adventure game from Adventure International for the Atari 8-bit computers. In 1997, the group starred in the Fantastic Four video game. The team appeared in the Spider-Man: The Animated Series video game, based on the 1990s Spider-Man animated series, for the Super NES and Sega Genesis. The Thing and the Human Torch appeared in the 2005 game Marvel Nemesis: Rise of the Imperfects.

All of the Fantastic Four appear as playable characters in the game Marvel: Ultimate Alliance with Doctor Doom being the main enemy. The members of the Fantastic Four are also featured in Marvel: Ultimate Alliance 2, although the team is separated over the course of the game, with Mister Fantastic being 'locked' into the Pro-Registration side of the game's storyline and the Thing briefly becoming unavailable to the player – just as he left America in protest of the war – until he returns to assist in preventing civilian casualties during the conflict. The Fantastic Four also appear in Marvel Ultimate Alliance 3: The Black Order this time as playable DLC (downloadable content) alongside additional members of Marvel Knights and the X-Men.

The Human Torch has an appearance in a mini-game where the player races against him in all versions of Ultimate Spider-Man, except on the Game Boy Advance platform. The Fantastic Four star in tie-in videogames based on the 2005 film Fantastic Four, and its sequel. The Fantastic Four are also playable characters in Marvel Heroes, Lego Marvel Super Heroes, and Marvel Rivals.

The Fantastic Four starred in their own virtual pinball game Fantastic Four for Pinball FX 2 released by Zen Studios.

== See also ==
- Maximum Fantastic Four
