= Hogun =

Fictional character in Marvel Comics

- Hogun (right) as depicted in Thor vol. 3 #4 (November 2007). Art by Olivier Coipel.

Publication information
- Publisher: Marvel Comics
- First appearance: Journey into Mystery #119 (August 1965)
- Created by: Stan Lee (writer); Jack Kirby (artist)

In-story information
- Full name: Hogun
- Species: Asgardian
- Team affiliations: Warriors Three; Thor Corps
- Notable aliases: Hogun the Grim
- Abilities: Superb hand-to-hand combatant and horseman Excellent battlefield warrior Superhuman strength, speed, stamina, and durability Healing factor Extended lifespan

Hogun the Grim is a fictional character appearing in American comic books published by Marvel Comics. He is a charter member of the Warriors Three, a trio of Asgardian adventurers and supporting cast of Thor in the Marvel Universe.

Tadanobu Asano portrays Hogun in the Marvel Cinematic Universe films Thor (2011), Thor: The Dark World (2013), and Thor: Ragnarok (2017). Additionally, Travis Willingham, Clancy Brown, and Paul Dobson have voiced Hogun in animation.

== Publication history ==
Hogun first appeared in Journey into Mystery #119 (August 1965), and was created by Stan Lee and Jack Kirby.

Writer Stan Lee envisioned him as sharing several traits with characters played by actor Charles Bronson.

== Fictional character biography ==
Hogun is a member of a trio of Asgardian adventurers consisting of Fandral the Dashing, Hogun the Grim, and Volstagg the Valiant and referred to as the Warriors Three. They were members of the supporting cast in Marvel's Thor comics and usually provided comic relief and side-adventures.

Hogun is not Aesir like most of the Asgardians. Also, his unnamed homeland was conquered long ago by Mogul of the Mystic Mountain, who slew Hogun's forebears and laid waste to the land. For a time he was apprenticed to the stone carvers. He joined with Volstagg and Fandral to judge a dare and formed a lifelong friendship. This dare, the "petting" of the Fenris wolf, led to a humiliating defeat for all three men. Afterwards, legends and tales would then stop referring to Hogun in cheerful terms and use dour, negative names.

He is primarily characterized by his brusque, taciturn, and often short-tempered demeanor. He is the brooding pessimist of the group, as opposed to Volstagg's irrepressible good humor and Fandral's brash heroism. He is a fierce and unrelenting warrior, a collector of weaponry and often the voice of reason for the Warriors Three.

Hogun has been involved in a great many adventures and quests, as a member of the Warriors Three, as an ally of Thor, and on his own. When first seen, Hogun had joined the quest for the power that had cracked the Oversword of Asgard. Soon after that, he helped quell a mutiny led by Loki. He then helped repel an attack of Flying Trolls in Thryheim. With Thor, he helped defeat the forces of Harokin. With Thor, he then battled the dragon Fafnir. With Thor, he defeated the Mogul of the Mystic Mountain, who had destroyed Hogun's homeland so long ago. He helped defend Asgard from the Destroyer. He encountered the Hulk.

Hogun helped defend Asgard against Mangog. He encountered the Silver Surfer. With Thor, he battled the Thermal Man. He helped defend Asgard against Surtur. He helped Thor escape Mephisto. He became entranced by Infinity and was forced to battle Thor, Balder, Sif, and other Asgardians. He was freed from his trance by Loki and Karnilla. Hogun is the first to fight back when Loki takes confront of Asgard; he attempts to destroy the villain's power ring with his mace. This fails and Sif talks Loki out of murdering Hogun on the spot. With Thor, he was sent on a quest by Odin, but returned to help defend Asgard against Mangog again. He was seemingly destroyed by Pluto. but was actually sent to Earth by Odin. With Thor, he battled Ego-Prime, was exiled to Earth, but then abducted by Mephisto, and ultimately freed by Thor. With Thor and company, he set out on a quest to find the missing Odin. He battled Sssthgar's slavers, Mercurio, and Xorr. He defeated doppelgangers created by the wizard Igron.

With Thor, Hogun later battled Zarrko the Tomorrow Man. He defeated diamond exchange robbers in New York. With Thor, he helped depose the usurpers Mangog and Igron. With Thor, he set out on a quest to find Odin, who was missing again. He battled Spoor, the Grey Gargoyle, and the Soul-Survivors. He defeated the Executioner and the Enchantress. He battled the Destroyer and Loki. He helped defend Asgard against Ragnarok. He battled the dragon Fafnir again.

Hogun later battled the forces of Surtur on Earth. Later, Volstagg adopts two orphaned boys from Earth, Kevin and Mick. Hogun realizes the boys needed something more in order to grow and prosper in Asgard. He gave them portions of the Apples of Idunn, fruit that gave the gods long life and strength. Hogun and Fandral also convey to the boys that any child of Volstagg's is their child as well and will be watched out for.

He was then sent to Earth to locate Thor, but suffered a concussion and dementia. He battled Daredevil, and was marked for death by Seth. Hogun learned the value of trickery and silliness over a mace blow in an adventure that saved a stricken groomsman and saved Asgard from certain doom. He helped to defend Asgard against the forces of Seth. His quest with Thor to seek Ulagg the Grand Enchanter was later recounted. He helped the Avengers battle Blastaar. He was rescued from Flying Trolls by the New Mutants. Hogun also helped battle Ymir and Surtur.

In 2005 a mini-series was published centering on Thor and his allies in the Warriors Three, called Thor: Blood Oath. In it Thor and the Warriors Three are sent on a quest as penance for accidentally killing an enemy giant during a time of peace. Hogun heroically endures the assaults of the Egyptian god, Thoth, to shout three names at Thoth's temple to fulfill their quest. He was also the only member of the group able to dominate the bloodthirsty spirit of Chulain's spear, and prevent a murderous rampage. Although the group fails in their quest, through the use of each warrior's unique capabilities, the adventure eventually comes to a good end.

Hogun dies in Ragnarök fairly early. Later, however, he is found alive and well, under the name Leo Kincaid, and was restored by Thor. He establishes a new life in Asgard. Hogun is one of the army of Asgardians and Earth-based heroes who help protect it during the 'Siege' invasion; Norman Osborn had attacked with an army of Earth supervillains.

When Thor vanishes and Mjolnir chooses a female wielder, Hogun and Fandral quest throughout the known galaxy for the Odinson. This is especially important as Odin himself has become irrational. Volstagg chooses to stay behind, having taken on many duties, including the care of Thor's lady love Jane Foster, who has become ill.

== Powers and abilities ==
Hogun possesses the conventional superhuman abilities of an Asgardian male.

Hogun is superhumanly strong, his strength being somewhat greater than that of the average Asgardian. Hogun is also extremely long lived, though not immortal, and ages at a pace much slower than humans. The tissues of his body are also more resilient than those of a human, rendering him much more resistant to physical injury. If he is injured, his body is able to heal itself with superhuman speed and efficiency. Hogun's superior musculature and metabolism grants him superhuman levels of stamina. Like all Asgardians, Hogun's bone, skin and muscle are much denser than that of a human, which helps to contribute to his superhuman strength and durability.

Hogun is an excellent overall battlefield warrior, a superb hand-to-hand combatant and horseman. He is highly proficient in the use of all Asgardian weapons, and is a master of bludgeoning weapons, especially the mace. He is also sometimes armed with a sword. He has also demonstrated skill in the area of battlefield medicine and healing arts, though he makes no claim of being a healer of any real proficiency. He has also used the Elixir of Recovery, an Asgardian medical potion.

== Other versions ==
=== Earth X ===
An alternate universe version of Hogun from Earth-9997 appears in Earth X. This version is an alien who the Celestials manipulated into believing that he was a god.

=== Marvel Adventures ===
An alternate universe version of Hogun from Earth-20051 appears in Marvel Adventures.

=== Marvel Zombies ===
An alternate universe version of Hogun from Earth-2149 appears in Marvel Zombies: Dead Days #1.

=== Mutant X ===
An alternate universe version of Hogun from Earth-1298 makes a cameo appearance in Mutant X 2001 #1 as one of several heroes who were killed battling the Beyonder.

=== Thor: The Mighty Avenger ===
An alternate universe version of Hogun from Earth-10091 appears in Thor: The Mighty Avenger.

=== Ultimate Marvel ===
An alternate universe version of Hogun from Earth-1610 appears in the Ultimate Marvel universe.

=== Ultimate Universe ===
Hogun appears with the rest of the Warriors Three in the Ultimate Universe imprint. Here, he helps with the Asgardian Revolution against All-Father Loki.

== In other media ==
Tadanobu Asano (left) as Hogun in the 2011 film, Thor.

=== Television ===
- Hogun appears in The Super Hero Squad Show, voiced by Travis Willingham.
- Hogun appears in The Avengers: Earth's Mightiest Heroes episode "The Siege of Asgard".
- Hogun appears in the Hulk and the Agents of S.M.A.S.H. episode "For Asgard", voiced by Clancy Brown. This version speaks in an Australian accent.
- Hogun appears in the Guardians of the Galaxy episode "Asgard War, Part One: Lightning Strikes," voiced again by Travis Willingham.
- An alternate universe variant of Hogun appears in the What If...? episode "What If... Thor Were an Only Child?", voiced by David Chen.

=== Film ===
- Hogun appears in Hulk vs. Thor, voiced by Paul Dobson.
- Hogun appears in Thor: Tales of Asgard, voiced again by Paul Dobson.
- Hogun appears in media set in the Marvel Cinematic Universe, portrayed by Tadanobu Asano. This version is a Vanir from Vanaheimr. Introduced in the film Thor, Asano reprises the role in Thor: The Dark World and Thor: Ragnarok. In the latter film, he is killed by Hela.

=== Video games ===
- Hogun appears as an unlockable playable character in Marvel Avengers Alliance.
- Hogun appears in Thor: The Dark World - The Official Game, voiced by Ken Kensei.
- Hogun appears as an unlockable playable character in Lego Marvel's Avengers.
- Hogun appears as a playable character and boss in Marvel Future Fight.

=== Merchandise ===
A figure of Hogun was released in Hasbro's Thor: The Mighty Avenger tie-in line. Due to trademark issues, the figure is marketed as Marvel's Hogun.
