= Balder the Brave =

Marvel Comics character

- Balder as depicted in Thor (vol. 3) #9 (July 2008). Art by Olivier Coipel.

Publication information
- Publisher: Marvel Comics
- First appearance: Journey into Mystery #85 (October 1962)
- Created by: Stan Lee (writer); Jack Kirby (artist)

In-story information
- Alter ego: Balder Odinson
- Species: Asgardian
- Place of origin: Asgard
- Abilities: Superhuman strength, superhuman speed, superhuman endurance, and longevity; Light manipulation

Balder the Brave is a fictional character appearing in American comic books published by Marvel Comics. The character is based on the deity Baldr from Norse mythology.

== Publication history ==
Created by editor-plotter Stan Lee and penciller Jack Kirby, Balder first appeared in Journey into Mystery #85 (October 1962).

== Fictional character biography ==
Balder is the son of Odin, the ruler of the Norse gods of Asgard, and the half-brother of Thor. He is companion to the Warriors Three and often aids Thor against his foes, which include Loki, their adopted brother, the Executioner and Enchantress, the Enchanters Three, the Wrecker and Mangog. At the request of Heimdall, Balder warns Thor when the Storm Giant Skagg and the fire demon Surtur are released by Loki in a plot to kill Odin. Balder is also briefly named ruler of Asgard during Thor's quest to find a then-missing Odin.

Balder is beloved by most who know him. When he is threatened with execution for ignoring the call of battle for the sake of a fallen bird, his men beg Odin to take one of their lives instead.

As in mythology, the death of the Marvel version of Balder is the catalyst for Ragnarök and the destruction of Asgard. To prevent this, Odin casts a spell to make Balder vulnerable again. Ragnarok is nearly triggered when Loki has the blind god Hoder accidentally kill Balder with a mistletoe arrow, but is averted by Odin, who creates a shield around Balder's pyre. Odin later restores Balder to life when the Asgardians, after being slain in a battle with the Celestials, are resurrected by Thor using portions of energy donated by other gods. On a second occasion, Balder is traumatized by a near-death experience as he sees the souls of those he has slain in battle. He then renounces killing. It is later revealed that to escape Hel, Balder was forced by Hela to again kill all of those "tens of thousands" he had previously slain in battle. This epic confrontation lasts so long that Balder's hair has turned white when he finally emerges victorious. Volstagg of the Warriors Three takes it upon himself to become Balder's boon friend in an attempt to lift him out of his long depression. While Balder treasures the friendship, Volstagg's efforts do little to soothe him.

Balder also has a love-hate relationship with Karnilla, the Queen of the Norns, who aids both Loki and Asgard at times. On one occasion, Karnilla forces Balder to renounce Odin and serve her, whilst on another she joins forces with Asgard against Surtur at Balder's request. Her emotions are roused by Balder's deep depression as she feels Loki has ruined a unique member of the Asgardians. Karnilla's lust for Balder inadvertently causes the death of Balder's love, Nanna—an act that Balder does not forget.

Balder later accepts his warrior aspect and saves Karnilla's people from a rogue giant's spell. Balder and the other Asgardians (with the exception of Thor) eventually perish during the final Ragnarok, though Balder is later found inhabiting the armor of the Destroyer.

Loki reveals that Balder is the son of Odin and Frigga and the half-brother of Thor, making him a prince of Asgard. When Thor is forced to kill his reborn grandfather, Bor, Loki coerces Balder—now a royal prince—to exile the Thunder God. Balder then assumes the throne of Asgard. When Loki has the Asgardians moved to Latveria, he is shown at a banquet held by Doctor Doom. Balder asks why they could not invite Thor since the Asgardians were now in Latveria. Loki calmed Balder down to prevent Doom from reacting to the comment.

Balder later witnesses Bill's assault by Loki's henchmen due to Bill's discovery of the evil nature of Loki's scheme with Doctor Doom. After fending the henchmen off, Bill dies in Balder's arms after revealing Loki's plot and asking Balder to tell Kelda that he loves her. Balder and the other Asgardians retaliate even after Doom kills Kelda. Balder and the other Asgardians are forced to fight Endrik (who has been modified with technological implants) and many other mutilated Asgardians. Balder and the other Asgardians continue their fight with the mutilated Asgardians while Thor battles Doom. Balder kills the mutilated Asgardians to get to Kelda's heart. After Loki restores Kelda to life and Thor defeats Doom's Destroyer armor, Balder leads the Asgardians back to Broxton, Oklahoma. Back in Asgard, Balder is concerned about his foolishness over allowing what transpired in Latveria. Loki assures him he is a fine king.

During the Siege storyline, Loki warns Balder that Norman Osborn is rallying an army to invade Asgard following the incident with Volstagg and the U-Foes at Soldier Field. Balder is later informed about the situation with Volstagg by Hogun and Fandral. When Captain America arrives with the New Avengers and the Secret Warriors, Balder is pleased that Thor's allies have joined the battle. Balder remains King of Asgard after the failed Siege but is stricken with great guilt, believing his rule has led to nothing but ruin. However, Thor persuades him to remain monarch and accept him as his new Chief Advisor.

Balder attends the Council of Godheads convened to counter the imminent universal threat of the Chaos King and his impending Chaos War to decide which mortal paragon they would choose to combat Amatsu-Mikaboshi. Vali Halfling later appears to the Council and challenges them to disprove their impotence by stopping him before he attains godhood. Balder tells Anansi that Halfling was the son of Loki and banished to Midgard long ago. When the Chaos War eventually nears Earth, the Council summons Hercules, Amadeus Cho and Delphyne Gorgon before them and commands them to bow before the Council's authority. In return, the newly restored and empowered Hercules fights and easily bests most of them, including Balder.

After Amatsu-Mikaboshi overthrows the Underworld, and Hela and Pluto are overwhelmed by his devastating forces, Balder calls for the Council to fight alongside him against the Chaos King. The Japanese sun goddess Amaterasu seals the throne room of the Celestial Axis, claiming that if he went now, Amatsu-Mikaboshi would be able to trace him back to the Axis and subsequently invade all their realms. However, Amatsu-Mikaboshi breaks into the Celestial Axis after Hercules pierces the veil shielding it and launches an assault on all of Earth's pantheons, seemingly slaying all of them with brutal ease and slaughtering many deities, although Balder is one of the survivors.

== Powers and abilities ==
Balder is said to be the fastest and most agile of all the Asgardian warriors, his speed rivaled only by Hermod. Thor notes that Balder can move faster than the "speed of light" and is too fast to strike, so Thor must use his lightning to disarm him (and break the spell three troll witches had cast upon him). Balder possesses superhuman strength superior to the average Asgardian male and, like all Asgardians, superhuman endurance and longevity (via the Golden Apples of Idunn). He is immune to all Earthly diseases and has some resistance to magic. Courtesy of a spell cast by his mother and Asgardian goddess Frigga to try to avert Ragnarök, Balder is almost invulnerable while within the Asgardian dimension, unable to suffer harm from virtually any living or non-living being. Only weapons made of mistletoe wood can harm or cause fatal injury to him, or he can will himself to be vulnerable. Balder can also die in the Asgardian dimension through means that do not involve weaponry: for example, he could starve to death or be asphyxiated. It is unknown whether Balder also becomes vulnerable when he is in dimensions other than Asgard or Earth.

Being the Asgardian god of light, Balder could, after a period of intense training, also generate low light as well as heat strong enough to melt the entire fortress of Utgard-Loki and reduce him and his fellow Frost Giants to a tiny size. He is shown to retain this ability even on Midgard after many months, as shown in the events of Siege, albeit possibly with the aid of his enchanted blade. He can communicate with animals, and has also demonstrated minor magical talents on rare occasions, such as shielding himself from mortal eyesight while flying to Earth on Odin's steed in one instance when he sensed that Thor was in danger on Earth while Balder was in Asgard, or teleporting himself and Sif (without the use of the latter's enchanted sword) to Earth from Asgard in another. Though Balder can project some degree of energy, unlike most of his brethren, his ability to do so is far less than that of the other gods of light in other pantheons (namely Apollo, who can control at least double the amount of energy as Balder). He is also a highly skilled weapons master, wielding the enchanted sword of Frey, capable of fighting of its own accord, with millennia of extensive experience and training, and is a proficient tactician and master horseman, having been entrusted with several special missions by Odin.

Balder becomes a member of Earth's Council of Godheads following Thor's banishment.

== Reception ==
In 2022, Screen Rant included Balder the Brave in their "10 Marvel Comics Gods Who Should Join The MCU Next" list.

== Other versions ==
=== Earth X ===
An alternate universe version of Earth-9997 appears in Earth X. This version is an alien who the Celestials manipulated into believing that he was a god.

=== Marvel Zombies ===
An alternate universe version of Balder from Earth-2149 appears in Marvel Zombies: Dead Days #1.

=== MC2 ===
An alternate universe version of Balder from Earth-982 who was killed battling Galactus appears in Last Planet Standing #2.

=== Ultimate Marvel ===
An alternate universe version of Balder from Earth-1610 appears in the Ultimate Marvel universe. After he is killed by Loki, Odin resurrects him in the human form of Donald Blake.

=== Ultimate Universe ===
In the Ultimate Universe imprint, Balder appears as Queen Hela's servant in Valhalla.

== In other media ==
=== Television ===
- Balder appears in "The Mighty Thor" segment of The Marvel Super Heroes, voiced by Chris Wiggins.
- Balder makes a non-speaking cameo appearance in the Spider-Man and His Amazing Friends episode "The Vengeance of Loki!".
- Balder appears in The Avengers: Earth's Mightiest Heroes, voiced by Nolan North.
- Balder appears in The Super Hero Squad Show episode "Lo, How the Mighty Hath Abdicated!", voiced by Travis Willingham.
- Balder appears in the M.O.D.O.K. episode "Tales from the Great Bar-Mitzvah War!", in which he is accidentally killed by M.O.D.O.K. via a shredder.

=== Film ===
Balder appears in Hulk vs. Thor, voiced by Michael Adamthwaite.

=== Video games ===
Balder appears in Marvel: Ultimate Alliance, voiced by Dave Wittenberg.

=== Merchandise ===
Balder received a figurine in The Classic Marvel Figurine Collection.

== Collected editions ==
Title	Material collected	Published date	ISBN
Thor: Balder The Brave	Balder the Brave #1-4 and Thor #360-362	September 2009	978-0785138853
Thor by Walt Simonson Omnibus	Balder the Brave #1-4 and Thor #337-355, #357-369, #371-382	October 2017	978-0785146339
Thor by Walter Simonson Vol. 3	Balder the Brave #1-4 and Thor #357-363	May 2018	978-1302909017
