= Thor: The Mighty Avenger (toy line) =

Toy line by Hasbro

- Type: Action figures
- Invented by: Marvel Comics
- Company: Hasbro
- Country: United States
- Availability: 2011–2011
- Materials: Plastic
- Features: Thor movie

Thor: The Mighty Avenger is a toy line manufactured by Hasbro based on the Marvel Studios film Thor. It is composed mainly of 3.75" scale action figures.

The line falls under Marvel's "Avengers Assemble" marketing banner, which included the Iron Man: The Armored Avenger and Captain America: The First Avenger toy lines. This was used as a lead up to 2012's The Avengers film.

Unlike previous 3.75" action figure lines based on films, Hasbro did not do a comic series with this line. All of the figures were based on the film.

== Action Figures - 3.75" Single Carded ==
=== Wave 1 - March 2011 ===
#	Figure	Description	Accessories
01	Battle Hammer Thor		Sword becomes hammer
02	Sword Spike Thor		Hidden sword spike
03	Lightning Clash Thor	Only has articulation at shoulders and legs	Glowing hammer, two batteries included
04	Secret Strike Loki		Blades combine
05	Shield Bash Marvel's Odin	silver armor	Pop-out shield spikes
05*	Shield Bash Marvel's Odin gold variant	gold armor	Pop-out shield spikes
06	Invasion Frost Giant	Light blue skin	Includes "ice" weapons

=== Wave 2 - May 2011 ===
#	Figure	Description	Accessories
07	Hammer Smash Thor	Helmet version Thor	Hammer
08	Fandral	Harpoon Blade	Harpoon
09	Hogun	Blade Battle	Detachable "blades"
10	Volstagg	Ram Smash	Axe ram
11	Fire Blast Marvel's Destroyer	Light-up chest / includes two button cell batteries	

=== Wave 3 - May 2011 ===
#	Figure	Description	Accessories
12	King Loki		Sword
13	Asgardian Glow Marvel's Odin		Sword and shield
14	Laufey	Ice Axe King	Headgear and ice club
15	Thunder Crusader Thor		Hammer

=== Wave 4 - June 2011 ===
#	Figure	Description	Accessories
16	Staff Strike Sif		Battle staff
17	Axe Attack Thor	Red cape and highlights	Sword becomes axe
18	Sorcerer Fury Loki		"Dagger" accessories
19	Cosmic Armor Thor	Glows in the dark	Hammer
20	Inferno Marvel's Destroyer	Light-up eyes / includes two button cell batteries	

== Action Figures - 3.75" Deluxe Series ==
=== Wave 1 - March 2011 ===
Figure	Description	Accessories
Blaster Armor Thor	Yellow markings	Hammer, missiles, launcher
Frost Giant	Ice attack, dark blue skin	Ice missiles

=== Wave 2 - March 2011 ===
Figure	Description	Accessories
Heimdall	Asgard Defender	Energy bolt launcher
Lightning Fury Thor		Lightning launcher

=== Wave 3 - Cancelled ===
This wave was never released.

Figure	Description	Accessories
Disc Launching Thor		Lightning disc launcher
Ice Claw Marvel's Frost Giant		Ice claws

== Action Figures - 6" Legends Series ==
=== Wave 1 - October 2011 ===
Series	Figure	Description	Accessories
Movie	Thor	Sculpted helmet	Hammer
Comic	Loki	Modern "Siege" Version	
Comic	Thor	Lord Of Asgard Version	Hammer and axe

== Action Figures - 8" Hero Series ==
=== Wave 1 - March 2011 ===
Figure	Description	Accessories
Thor	Light blue markings	Solid black hammer
Thor	Dark blue markings	Translucent blue hammer

=== Wave 2 - March 2011 ===
Figure	Description	Accessories
Marvel's Destroyer		

== Action Figures - 10" Large Scale ==
Release Date	Product	Features
March 2011	Lightning Power Thor	Lights and sounds; sword, missile launcher, hammer; includes two AAA batteries

== Role Play ==
Role play toys are products such as masks, gloves, and life-size accessories.

Release Date	Product	Features
March 2011	Armor of Asgard: Odin Sword	Nerf product
March 2011	Armor of Asgard: Thor Helmet	
March 2011	Armor of Asgard: Thor Hammer	Nerf product
March 2011	Armor of Asgard: Thor Sword	Nerf product
March 2011	Armor of Asgard: Thor Sword & Shield	Two-pack with plastic shield and small sword
March 2011	Thor Lightning Hammer	Flashing lights, thunder sounds, launching missile; includes 3 AAA batteries

== Marvel Super Hero Squad 3-Packs ==
=== Wave 1 - March 2011 ===
Name	Figures	Details
Asgardian Smash	Thor Hulk Marvel's Warrior Odin	Comic version / modern costume Comic version Film version
Battle for Asgard's Vault	Thor Loki Marvel's Destroyer	Comic version / classic costume Comic version Comic version
Battle in the Frozen Land	Thor Sif Marvel's Frost Giant	Comic version / classic costume Comic version Comic version
