= Alternative versions of Thor (Marvel Comics) =

Interpretations of the Marvel character

Alternate versions of Thor
- Cover of Secret Wars (vol. 2) #2 (July 2015), featuring many alternate versions of Thor. Art by Alex Ross.
- Publisher: Marvel Comics
- First appearance: Journey into Mystery #83 (August 1962)
- Created by: Stan Lee; Larry Lieber; Jack Kirby
- Characters: Thor (Ultimate Marvel); King Thor; Thunderstrike (Eric Masterson); Thunderstrike (Kevin Masterson); Beta Ray Bill; Thordis; War Thor; Throg; Ragnarok; Dargo Ktor; Thor (Earth-56377); Thor (Marvel 1602); Red Norvell
- See also: Thor (Marvel Comics) in other media

Thor was created by Stan Lee, Larry Lieber and Jack Kirby. There had been multiple alternative versions of Thor, both in the main continuity as well as alternate stories. The character is based on the Norse deity Thor.

== Prime Earth (Earth-616) ==
=== Red Norvell ===
Part of a documentary crew brought to Asgard by Loki, Roger "Red" Norvell meets and falls in love with Lady Sif. Norvell is given Thor's Iron Gauntlets and Belt of Strength by Loki to compete with Thor for Sif's affections, beating him and taking his hammer, with neither realizing this was part of a master plan by Odin to create a surrogate God of Thunder to die fighting the Serpent and fulfill the prophecy.

=== Thori ===
Thori is the pet of Thor. Thori is a Hel-Hound who can exude flames, track beings across dimensional planes, and, alone among his litter, speak.

=== Beta Ray Bill ===
Beta Ray Bill is the champion of the Korbinites, an alien race. Debuting in Thor #337, the character was initially intended to be a surprise as an apparent monster who unexpectedly proves to be a great hero. Bill becomes the first being outside of the Marvel Universe's Norse pantheon to be deemed worthy enough to wield Thor's hammer, Mjolnir. After an initial rivalry for possession of the weapon, both the thunder god and the alien warrior reconciled as staunch allies. Bill is granted a war hammer of his own called Stormbreaker, which grants him the same powers as Thor. He has since made numerous appearances.

=== Eric Masterson ===
Thor initially bonded with architect Eric Masterson to save the latter's life when he was injured during one of Thor's battles. The bonding allows Masterson to transform into Thor while Thor's mind gains control. Later, Thor is punished for apparently killing Loki and exiled. Masterson retains possession of Mjolnir and the ability to transform into Thor's form, continuing his roles as a member of the Avengers and protector of Earth. Thor is eventually released from exile, but asks that Masterson continue serving as in his stead. Tricked by the Enchantress Masterson attacks Thor, and soon after relinquishes Mjolnir to Thor. In gratitude for his services, Odin provides Masterson with an enchanted mace, Thunderstrike, the name of which he uses as his new code name. He later heroically sacrifices himself to defeat the Egyptian god Set. The weapon and name Thunderstrike are later taken up by Masterson's son Kevin.

=== Jane Foster ===
Marvel announced that in October 2014 there will be a new Thor who is female. As revealed in the aftermath of the Original Sin storyline, Thor lost his ability to wield Mjolnir, which was later found by Jane Foster, who obtains Thor's power and his name. Thor, unaware of his successor's identity and believing Foster would not be able to use Mjolnir due to her cancer, uses the battle axe Jarnbjorn in place of Mjolnir.

=== Rune King Thor ===
Rune King Thor is a version of Thor who hung himself from the tree of Yggdrasil to obtain rune magic. After dying, Thor ends up in Helheim and sees Hela, who tries to attack him. However, Thor’s Odinforce saves him and brings him back to life, giving him immense power.

== Alternative continuities ==
=== Age of Apocalypse ===
In the Age of Apocalypse reality, Donald Blake never discovers Mjolnir and thus never becomes Thor. Blake, as a member of the Human High Council, meets with Mikhail Rasputin for peace talks. Knowing Rasputin would never keep his word, Blake stabs him and shoves him out a window, with both falling to their deaths.

=== Amalgam Comics ===
Thorion, a composite character based on Thor and DC Comics character Orion, appears in the Amalgam Comics imprint. This version is the son of Thanoseid and was raised by Odin as part of a truce between Apokolips and New Asgard. Thor-El, a separate character based on Thor and Superman, appears in the series Unlimited Access.

=== Dargo Ktor ===
Dargo Ktor debuted in Thor #384 (October 1987) by Tom Defalco and Ron Frenz. Dargo Ktor lived in a distant dystopian future, where people of earth are oppressed by the oppressive corp. He becomes the Thor of that future after realising that he is worthy to lift Mjolnir and thus fights the oppressive corp and Loki to save his people.

=== Earth-56377 ===
On Earth-56377, Thor became unworthy to wield Mjolnir as it had failed him when the Masters of Evil devastated Asgard. Since then, Thor had been stalked by Mjolnir which led to Mjolnir following him to the Himalayas. Thor is trained by Lei Kung, gaining the power of the Iron Fist, and eventually allows Mjolnir to accompany him. Thor goes on to join a multiversal version of the Avengers.

=== Iron Hammer ===
Sigurd Stark, a composite character based on Thor and Iron Man, appears in the "Infinity Wars" storyline. This version was originally Stark Odinson, the son of Odin. He was banished to Earth for his arrogance and eventually the fifth richest person on the world thanks to his skill in technology. After being captured by Dark Elves, Sigurd is poisoned by an arrow, slowing killing him, and taken by the Elves to aid their other prisoner Eitri in building weapons for the Elves. Sigurd and Eitri build an armor to prevent the poison from killing Sigurd, along with a hammer to escape the Dark Elves. However, during their escape, Eitri is killed. After escaping, Sigurd travels for some time and eventually uncovers his identity as Stark Odinson. Odin offers to make Sigurd a god again, but he refuses.

=== King Thor ===
King Thor first appears in Thor: God of Thunder #1, and originates from Earth-14412. He is visually based on Odin, having only one eye, but in addition one of his arms is replaced by one of the arms of the Destroyer armor. He also is in possession of the Odinforce, now renamed the Thor Force. He also has adapted some of Odin's mannerisms, notably his bitterness and cynicism.

Millennia from the present, Thor becomes the All-Father of Asgard. However, some time before this, Loki successfully destroys the Earth, and King Thor comes to him for revenge for killing everyone he loves. Loki raises an army of undead from the corpses of the Avengers, and Thor fights them off before Loki retreats into the past to corrupt the Thor of the present. This experience leaves Thor a bitter and cynical king, much like his father.

Some time after this, Gorr the God Butcher razes Asgard with an army of Black Berserkers, killing or capturing its inhabitants. Gorr spares King Thor as a form of torture, marooning him in the ruins of Asgard to look back on his failures, keeping him there with an army of Black Berserkers to guard him. King Thor remains imprisoned in Asgard for 900 years, only to be liberated when the Prime Thor travels through time in pursuit of Gorr, who has fled his present. Together, along with a young version of Thor from the 9th century AD, the Thors defeat Gorr and save the surviving Asgardians and other gods.

Some time after this, Galactus returns to Earth to consume what is left of it. King Thor, having grown sentimental over what the Earth once was, attempts to fight Galactus off, but is blasted into space by the Devourer of Worlds. King Thor retrieves All-Black the Necrosword from the black hole he cast it in after Gorr's defeat, returns to Earth, and makes short work of Galactus, sparing the Devourer of Worlds only when he collapses from the exhaustion of the battle. During this, King Thor's blood restores life to Earth. King Thor then agrees to let Galactus live and gives him leave to consume Mars in exchange for his life. However, Galactus acquires All-Black shortly after this and goes on a planet killing spree across the universe, becoming the Butcher of Worlds.

Millennia later, King Thor and his granddaughters repopulate the Earth with flora and fauna like multi-tusked elephants and different hybrids. Thor personally created two new humans, naming them Jane and Steve. Humanity steadily regrows and prospers under Thor's guidance. However, the universe eventually starts to get consumed by entropy. King Thor heads to the edge of the universe in an attempt to stop it, only to be confronted by an older version of Wolverine, who is now in possession of the Phoenix Force. Logan is bitter at Thor for having disrupted the natural order of things out of sentiment, warning him that his actions have attracted the attention of Doctor Doom, who has become the Sorcerer Supreme and wields the Starbrand, the Iron Fist, and the Spirit of Vengeance. When Doom returns, Logan sacrifices himself by transferring the Phoenix Force into Mjolnir. With the power of the Phoenix, Thor fights Doom in the Earth's mantle for 99 years, emerging victorious but collapsing into the Forever Sleep to recover.

Some time later, Loki attacks Asgard again, this time in possession of All-Black the Necrosword, wanting to kill Thor once and for all. However, in the midst of their battle, Loki is unexpectedly stabbed by Gorr, whose consciousness survived in All-Black. King Thor finally defeats All-Black after it takes over a massive black hole, traveling to its center and unleashing his full power. This destroys All-Black and renders Gorr mortal, this time with amnesia. Eventually, King Thor leaves Earth in the care of his granddaughters, and sails to the edge of the universe in Skíðblaðnir to stave off the inevitable entropy.

=== Marvel 1602 ===
In the "Marvel 1602" reality, a version of Thor appears with an alter ego of an elderly Christian priest named Donal—an allusion to Thor's original secret identity Donald Blake. Donal fears and despises his alter-ego, believing that the shared existence will damn him. This version of Thor speaks in Anglo-Saxon alliterative verse rather than the Shakespearean English that the mainstream universe Thor speaks in.

=== Marvel 2099 ===
In the Marvel 2099 reality, the role of Thor is taken by a man named Cecil MacAdam, who belongs to a class of priests known as "Thorites" who worship the original version of Thor. Avatarr, the CEO of Alchemax, grants him and others the powers of the Norse gods, along with brainwashing that both convinces them they are the gods and keeps them under his control. Later, in "2099: Manifest Destiny", a rejuvenated Steve Rogers finds Mjolnir and becomes the new Thor. He gives Mjolnir to Miguel O'Hara (Spider-Man 2099) at the end of the story.

=== Marvel Zombies ===
Briefly, Thor appears as a cannibalistic zombie wielding a makeshift version of a hammer composed of a concrete block and pipe as he is no longer worthy to wield Mjolnir, which he breaks when trying to attack the Silver Surfer. When the Silver Surfer is finally struck down, only a handful of zombies manage to eat a piece of his body, and Thor is not one of them. Those who did consume the Silver Surfer acquire his cosmic powers, and Thor, along with the rest of the zombies, is seemingly slaughtered. Giant-Man can be seen throwing away his skeleton after burning his body.

But in Marvel Zombies: Dead Days- a one shot prequel to the main events of the Zombie universe-, Thor is amongst the heroes on the S.H.I.E.L.D. helicarrier who survived the first wave of the zombie plague. After Reed Richards was driven insane following his construction of a device to travel to other universes, Thor, on Nick Fury's orders, destroyed the device rather than using it to escape to another dimension unaffected by the virus, in order to ensure that what had happened to their world couldn't happen to another.

=== Old Man Logan ===
Danielle Cage, daughter of Luke Cage and Jessica Jones, is a recurring character in the Old Man Logan miniseries and its sequel, Dead Man Logan. In the Wastelands, Thor died many years in the past and his hammer lies in the countryside, with nobody able to lift it, and a small cult is formed around it. After being shot, Cage falls next to the hammer and proves worthy to wield it, which saves her life. The character would be used next in the limited series Avengers of the Wastelands, which was released in January 2020.

=== Ruins ===
In Ruins, a dystopian alternate universe, Donald Blake appears claiming to have found Mjolnir when in fact he ate hallucinogenic mushrooms. Mjolnir is established to exist, appearing at the site where the Avengers were killed by the United States military.

=== Thrr ===
In the Spider-Ham comics, which take place on Earth-8311, a universe populated by talking animal parodies of Marvel Comics characters, Thor appears as Thrr, an anthropomorphic dog from "Arfgard".

=== Ultimate Marvel ===
Thor is a member of the superhero team the Ultimates in the Ultimate Marvel Universe. Despite his claims to be a Norse god, he is regarded by many to be delusional during the first months of his career. It is not until he is seen summoning an army of Asgardian warriors to fend off an attack on Washington DC by demonic forces commanded by Loki that Thor's teammates realize he is exactly who he says he is.

=== Ultimate Universe ===
An alternate universe version of Thor from Earth-6160 appears in the Ultimate Universe imprint.

=== What If? ===
Thor was featured in different "What If" stories:

- In an early story, Jane Foster discovered the stick rather than Donald Blake, spending time as a female Thor (called Thordis) before she was recalled to Asgard, allowing Odin to return the hammer to its rightful owner, although Jane went on to be elevated to godhood so that she could marry Odin.
- In What If Thor Fought Odin over Jane Foster (also known as What If Thor Fought the Asgardian Gods), after Jane Foster fails her ascension to goodhood, Thor is banished from Asgard along with Jane after refusing to accept Odin's judgment. Driven mad with rage, he leads his fellow Avengers in a battle against Odin's forces led by Loki, during which Iron Man and Loki are killed. After regaining his senses with Jane's help, Thor exiles himself from Asgard.
- In What If Rogue possessed the power of Thor?, Rogue accidentally permanently absorbed Thor when she and Mystique attempted to break the Brotherhood of Mutants out of prison, resulting in her killing most of the Avengers and the Brotherhood when she was unable to cope with Thor's power. Although Loki attempted to manipulate her into waging war on Asgard after she was able to lift Thor's hammer, the sight of Odin's genuine sense of loss allowed Thor's remnants to manifest in her subconscious, affirming that he was an ideal as well as a person, allowing Rogue to inherit his power.
- In What if Thor was the Herald of Galactus?, Galactus comes to devour Asgard. His herald kills Sif and Thor kills the herald in revenge. Galactus then announces that Asgard has fed him enough, and asks Thor to become his new herald in exchange for leaving Asgard alone. Thor agrees and directs Galactus to worlds with bloodthirsty races he deems worthy of destruction. Muninn, one of Odin's ravens, reaches him to inform him that Odin is dead and Asgard has fallen. Thor returns to Asgard, now under control of Loki and the frost giants, who reveal that Galactus' coming to Asgard was part of his plan to weaken Odin. After recovering Mjolnir, which he left behind, Thor guides Galactus to Asgard to feed in order to defeat Loki, since Asgard is an insult to what it once was. Thor frees Balder and the other imprisoned Asgardians, telling them to flee to Midgard. Thor defeats Loki, but continues being Galactus' herald: if he can be bold enough to decide which world is to be devoured, he is still worthy of wielding Mjolnir. On Earth, Balder becomes the premier super hero of Chicago. Thor also later becomes the Herald of Galactus in the 2020 run of the main Thor comic book series.

== Films and television ==
=== Marvel Cinematic Universe ===
Thor in the Marvel Cinematic Universe (Earth-199999) is depicted as one of the most powerful Asgardians, an ancient alien civilization with long ties to Earth, who humans consider to be gods. Thor wields a powerful hammer called Mjolnir, and is initially depicted as the arrogant heir to the throne of Asgard whose brash behaviors causes turmoil among the Nine Realms under Asgard's protection. This brings him into conflict with his villainous adopted brother, Loki. Thor commits himself to the protection of Earth, and becomes a founding member of the Avengers.Thor eventually becomes the King of Asgard after Odin's death, but the entire realm is destroyed during Ragnarök, where he had to fight his sister, Hela. Following the Blip, he passes the crown of New Asgard to Valkyrie and joins the Guardians of the Galaxy. Thor later comes into conflict with Gorr the God Butcher and the Olympian god Zeus, while reconnecting with his terminally ill ex-girlfriend, the now Mjolnir-wielding Jane Foster. Following Foster's death, Thor adopts Gorr's daughter, Love. This version of Thor is played by Chris Hemsworth.

The What If...? episode "What If... Thor Were an Only Child?" explores what would happen if the events of the Marvel Cinematic Universe (MCU) film Thor (2011) occurred differently, with Thor growing up without his adopted brother Loki and adopting a party lifestyle.
