= Zarrko =

Marvel Comics supervillain

Zarrko, the Tomorrow Man
- Zarrko as depicted in Journey into Mystery #101 (February 1964). Art by Jack Kirby.

Publication information
- Publisher: Marvel Comics
- First appearance: Journey into Mystery #86 (November 1962)
- Created by: Stan Lee (writer); Jack Kirby (artist)

In-story information
- Alter ego: Artur Zarrko
- Notable aliases: Boris; The Tomorrow Man
- Abilities: Genius-level intellect; Advanced scientific and technological skills

Zarrko, the Tomorrow Man (Artur Zarrko) is a supervillain appearing in American comic books published by Marvel Comics. The character is most commonly associated with Thor.

== Publication history ==
Zarrko was created by Stan Lee and Jack Kirby, and first appeared in Journey into Mystery #86 (November 1962).

== Fictional character biography ==
Zarrko is an inhabitant of New York in the 23rd century, in what appears to be an unknown alternate timeline. He becomes a civil servant specializing in the study of history but decides to use his intelligence for personal gain. Zarrko builds a makeshift time machine to travel back to the 20th century and steal an experimental cobalt bomb. The hero Thor defeats him; in the process, Zarrko is rendered amnesiac and returned to his proper time.

Loki restores Zarrko's memories, leading him to return to the 20th century with a giant mining robot and coerce Thor into helping him in exchange for not attacking further. When Zarrko and Thor return to the 30th century, Thor works with the ruling World Council to defeat Zarrko.

Zarrko clashes with Kang when he tries to conquer Zarrko's time period. Zarrko enlists the aid of Spider-Man and Iron Man to get inside Kang's base, as Kang had captured the other Avengers. Zarrko sends three devices to the present day to de-evolve that era to pre-industrial times, except for an area containing an American missile base. From there, he plans to steal nuclear weapons and rule the 23rd century. He is stopped by Spider-Man and the Human Torch.

Zarrko conquers Earth in the 50th century, where he encounters the Time-Twisters. He uses his Servitor robot to enlist the aid of Thor and the Warriors Three to defeat the Time-Twisters. Zarrko journeys with them to the "end of time" to thwart the Time-Twisters's birth. When Zarrko returns to the 50th century, he learns that he has been overthrown in his absence.

Sometime later, Zarrko travels to 2591 and tricks Dargo Ktor, the Thor of that era, into accompanying him to the 20th century to battle the second Thor (Eric Masterson) and Beta Ray Bill. Zarrko seeks to use the energy unleashed by the two's hammers to activate his Time Stabilizer device and collapse all the timelines into one. However, he is left adrift in the time-stream.

Zarrko returns disguised as Boris, a manservant to Kristoff Vernard. He is soon exposed, but uses his time machine to cause chaos in the building by bringing in various heroes and villains from the past and the future to battle one another. Zarrko escapes, deciding that all he wanted was a quiet place and food.

In Marvel Now!, Zarrko appears as a prisoner in S.H.I.E.L.D. custody after trying to steal nuclear materials in their possession. When the space-time continuum is broken during Age of Ultron, S.H.I.E.L.D. enlists Zarrko to combat timestream-related threats.

== Skills and abilities ==
Artur Zarrko is a genius with advanced studies in various applied sciences of his futuristic time period.

=== Equipment ===
Zarrko has designed numerous devices, such as force field projectors, radiation guns, the Servitor (a giant robot with extraordinary strength that can discharge concussive blasts and release time missiles containing "chronal energy" which allegedly reverses the flow of time), the time-scope (a device able to peer through different timelines), the RTS (a power-absorbing device), a mining robot, and the Time Cube (a time machine).

== Other versions ==
Zarrko appears in What If? #10, which takes place in an alternate universe where Jane Foster acquired Thor's hammer Mjolnir.

== In other media ==
Zarrko appears in "The Mighty Thor" segment of The Marvel Super Heroes, voiced by Rod Coneybeare. This version is from the 30th century.
