= The Marvel Super Heroes =

American animated TV series

- Genre: Superhero; Action; Adventure
- Based on: Characters by Marvel Comics
- Written by: June Patterson; Don Christensen; Jewell Schubel; James Carmichael
- Directed by: Ray Patterson; Grant Simmons; Don Lusk; Sid Marcus; Shamus Culhane; Sam Cornell; Kay Wright; Ed Rehberg; Clyde Geronimi
- Voices of: Bernard Cowan; Don Mason; Jack Creley; Claude Rae; Len Carlson; Henry Ramer; Max Ferguson; John Vernon; Vita Linder; Chris Wiggins
- Narrated by: Bernard Cowan
- Theme music composer: Jacques Urbont
- Opening theme: "The Marvel Super Heroes Have Arrived!"
- Ending theme: "The Merry Marvel Marching Society"
- Country of origin: United States
- Original language: English
- No. of seasons: 1
- No. of episodes: 65 (195 segments)

Production
- Executive producer: Robert L. Lawrence
- Animators: Bob Bentley; Dan Bessie; Ed Demattia; Fred Grable; Ralph Somerville; Nick Tafuri; Bill Ackerman; Otto Feuer; Chic Otterstrom; Russ von Neida; Dan Bessie; Ellsworth Barthen; Doug Crane; Irv Dressler; Milt Stein; Frank Onaitis; Bror Lansing; Sal Malmone
- Editors: Hank Gotzenberg; George Mahana; Walter B. Corso
- Running time: 16–18 min
- Production companies: Grantray-Lawrence Animation; Marvel Comics Group

Original release
- Network: First-run syndication
- Release: September 5 – December 2, 1966

Related
- Spider-Man

The Marvel Super Heroes is an American animated television series starring five comic book superheroes from Marvel Comics. The first TV series based on Marvel characters, it debuted in syndication on American television in 1966.

Produced by Grantray-Lawrence Animation, headed by Ray Patterson, Grant Simmons, and Robert L. Lawrence, it was an umbrella series of five segments, each approximately seven minutes long, broadcast on local television stations that aired the show at different times. The series ran initially as a half-hour program made up of three seven-minute segments of a single superhero, separated by a short description of one of the other four heroes. It has also been broadcast as a mixture of various heroes in a half-hour timeslot, and as individual segments as filler or within a children's TV program.

The segments were "Captain America", "The Incredible Hulk", "Iron Man", "The Mighty Thor" and "The Sub-Mariner".

== Production ==
Print advertisement for the show

Sixty-five half-hour episodes of three seven-minute chapters were produced, for a total of 195 segments that ran initially in broadcast syndication from September to December 1966.

The series had limited animation produced via xerography, consisting of edited images from the comics. Generally, the only movement involved the lips when a character spoke, the eyes, and the occasional arm or leg, or a fully animated black silhouette. The series used the original stories largely in their entirety, showcasing Jack Kirby, Steve Ditko and Don Heck art, among others, from the Silver Age of Comic Books.

Stan Lee, Marvel's editor and art director at the time, said in 2004 that he believed publisher Martin Goodman negotiated the deal with Grantray-Lawrence and that Lawrence chose the characters to be used. Lawrence rented Lee and his wife a penthouse apartment at 30 East 60th Street, near Madison Avenue, for Lee's use while he worked on the series. Lee lived in Hewlett Harbor, New York, on Long Island, at the time. Lee recalled, "I really don't remember any reaction from the Marvel artists involved. I wish I could claim to have written the [theme song] lyrics, because I think they're brilliant, but alas, I didn't". The songs were written by Jacques Urbont. In the meantime, series distributor Steve Krantz made a deal to subcontract production of The Mighty Thor segments to Paramount Cartoon Studios, headed by Shamus Culhane.

Marvel announced the series in the "Marvel Bullpen Bulletins" of the November 1966 issues, stating in that monthly fan page's hyperbolic style that, "It won't be long before our swingin' super-heroes [sic] make their star-studded debut on TV, appearing five nights a week — that's right, five — count 'em — five nights a week, for a half-hour each night. So you've just got time to make sure your set's in good working order — check your local paper for time and station — and prepare to have a ball!"

== Cast ==
=== Regular (credited) voice providers ===
- Len Carlson - Quicksilver, Loki, Odin, Nathan Garrett / Black Knight, Mad Thinker, President, Morgan Stark, Moon Man
- Bernard Cowan - Narrator, Steve Rogers / Captain America, Captain Torak, Morgan
- Jack Creley - Donald Blake / Thor, Asgardian Sentry
- Max Ferguson - Bruce Banner / Hulk
- Vita Linder - Jane Foster, Scarlet Witch, Sharon Carter, Peggy Carter, Lorelei, Neri, Celia Rawlings, Lady Dorma
- Don Mason - Rick Jones, Clint Barton / Hawkeye (regular voice)
- Claude Rae - Thunderbolt Ross, Zeus, Seidring, Cerberus, J.B. Stardust, Power Man
- Henry Ramer - Mandarin, Major Uberhart, Melter, Doctor Doom, Wolfgang, Vashti, Sando / Colonel Kranz
- John Vernon - Tony Stark / Iron Man, Namor, Glenn Talbot, Major Corey
- Chris Wiggins - Hawkeye (Iron Man segments), Kraven, Grey Gargoyle, Byrrah, Balder, Jack Frost, Count Nefaria, Happy Hogan's grandfather

=== Semi-regular and guest (uncredited) voice providers ===
- Carl Banas - Bucky Barnes
- Len Birman - Hercules, Giant-Man / Goliath, Swordsman, Boomerang
- Vern Chapman - Edwin Jarvis, Super-Adaptoid
- Henry Comor - Gargantus, Calvin Zabo / Mister Hyde, Executioner
- Rod Coneybeare - Zarrko, Cobra, Ringmaster, Super-Skrull, Cyclops, Attuma
- Peg Dixon
- Gillie Fenwick - Baron Zemo, Radioactive Man, Leader, Batroc the Leaper, Space Phantom, Cedric Rawlings, Heimdall, Director, Sandu, Premiere Pouldu, Lava King
- Margaret Griffin - Pepper Potts, Black Widow, Countess de la Spiroza, Enchantress, Scarlet Witch
- Tom Harvey - Happy Hogan, Iceman, Chameleon, Absorbing Man, Crimson Dynamo, Borok, Edam, Angel
- Paul Kligman - Red Skull, Krang, Mole Man, Metal Master, Professor X
- Douglas Master - Harrington Boyd
- Ed McNamara - Titanium Man
- Maxine Miller - Betty Ross, Norn Queen
- Mona O'Hearn - Wasp, Hippolyta
- Billie Mae Richards - Newsboy
- Alfie Scopp - Captain

For WNAC-TV in Boston, Arthur Pierce portrayed Captain America in live-action segments. Actors portraying other characters, including Doctor Doom, Hulk, and Bucky, also appeared in live-action segments. The segments were scripted by Jerry Siegel.

== Guest characters ==
Appearing in guest roles were:

- X-Men — The original lineup of Angel, Beast, Cyclops, Iceman, and Marvel Girl appeared in a Sub-Mariner episode, "Dr. Doom's Day / The Doomed Allegiance / Tug of Death". The story was an adaptation of Fantastic Four #6 (Sept. 1962) and Fantastic Four Annual #3 (1965) but since Grantray-Lawrence Animation did not own rights to the Fantastic Four, the producers substituted the X-Men, who were referred to as the "Allies for Peace".
- The Avengers — Episode 8 of The Incredible Hulk was an adaptation of Avengers #2 (Nov. 1963), and co-starred Thor, Iron Man (with his early golden armor recolored to match the red-and-gold design featured in the Iron Man episodes), Giant-Man, and Wasp. The lineup beginning in Avengers #4 (March 1964), with Thor, Iron Man, Giant-Man, the Wasp and the newly installed Captain America, appears in several Captain America episodes, as does the later line-up from Avengers #16 with Hawkeye, Quicksilver, and Scarlet Witch.

== Episodes ==
Each episode consists of three chapters.

=== Captain America ===
Episode	Title	Directed by	Written by	Adapted from	Original release date	Prod. code
1	"The Origin of Captain America" "Wreckers Among Us" "Enter Red Skull"	Unknown	Unknown	Tales of Suspense (vol. 1) #63-65	September 5, 1966	TBA
2	"The Sentinel and the Spy" "The Fantastic Origin of the Red Skull" "Lest Tyranny Triumph"	Unknown	Unknown	Tales of Suspense (vol. 1) #68, 66, 67	September 12, 1966	TBA
3	"The Revenge of Captain America" "The Trap Is Sprung" "So Dies a Villain"	Unknown	Unknown	The Avengers (vol. 1) #7, 15	September 19, 1966	TBA
4	"Midnight in Greymoor Castle" "If This Be Treason" "When You Lie Down with Dogs"	Unknown	Unknown	Tales of Suspense (vol. 1) #69-71	September 26, 1966	TBA
5	"The Return of Captain America" "The Search" "To Live Again"	Unknown	Unknown	The Avengers (vol. 1) #4, Tales of Suspense (vol. 1) #59	October 3, 1966	TBA
6	"Zemo and the Masters of Evil" "Zemo Strikes" "The Fury of Zemo"	Unknown	Unknown	The Avengers (vol. 1) #6	October 10, 1966	TBA
7	"Let the Past Be Gone" "The Adaptoid" "The Super Adaptoid"	Unknown	Unknown	Tales of Suspense (vol. 1) #82-84	October 17, 1966	TBA
8	"The Coming of the Swordsman" "Vengeance Is Ours" "Emissary of Destruction"	Unknown	Unknown	The Avengers (vol. 1) #19, 20	October 24, 1966	TBA
9	"The Bitter Taste of Defeat" "Sorcery Triumph" "The Road Back"	Unknown	Unknown	The Avengers (vol. 1) #21-22	October 31, 1966	TBA
10	"Doorway to Doom" "When the Commissar Commands" "Duel or Die"	Unknown	Unknown	The Avengers (vol. 1) #18	November 7, 1966	TBA
11	"The Sleeper Shall Awake" "Where Walks the Sleeper" "The Final Sleep"	Unknown	Unknown	Tales of Suspense (vol. 1) #72-74	November 14, 1966	TBA
12	"The Girl from Cap's Past" "The Stage Is Set" "30 Minutes to Live"	Unknown	Unknown	Tales of Suspense (vol. 1) #77, 75-76	November 21, 1966	TBA
13	"The Red Skull Lives" "He Who Holds the Cosmic Cube" "The Red Skull Supreme"	Unknown	Unknown	Tales of Suspense (vol. 1) #79-81	November 28, 1966	TBA

=== The Incredible Hulk ===
Episode	Title	Directed by	Written by	Adapted from	Original release date	Prod. code
1	"Origin of the Hulk" "Enter the Gorgon" "To Be a Man"	Unknown	Unknown	The Incredible Hulk (vol. 1) #1	September 6, 1966	TBA
2	"The Terror of the Toadmen" "Bruce Banner Wanted for Treason!" "Hulk Runs Amok"	Unknown	Unknown	The Incredible Hulk (vol. 1) #2	September 13, 1966	TBA
3	"A Titan Rides the Train!" "The Horde of Humanoids!" "On the Rampage!"	Unknown	Unknown	Tales to Astonish #63-65	September 20, 1966	TBA
4	"The Power of Doctor Banner!" "Where Strides the Behemoth" "Back from the Dead!"	Unknown	Unknown	Tales to Astonish #66-68	September 27, 1966	TBA
5	"Micro-Monsters" "The Lair of the Leader" "To Live Again"	Unknown	Unknown	Tales to Astonish #68-70	October 4, 1966	TBA
6	"Brawn Against Brain" "Captured at Last!" "Enter...the Chameleon!"	Unknown	Unknown	Tales to Astonish #60-63	October 11, 1966	TBA
7	"Within the Monster Dwells a Man!" "Another World, Another Foe!" "The Wisdom of the Watcher!"	Unknown	Unknown	Tales to Astonish #72-74	October 18, 1966	TBA
8	"The Space Phantom" "Sting of the Wasp" "Exit the Hulk"	Unknown	Unknown	The Avengers (vol. 1) #2	October 25, 1966	TBA
9	"The Incredible Hulk vs The Metal Master" "The Master Tests His Metal" "Mind Over Metal"	Unknown	Unknown	The Incredible Hulk (vol. 1) #6	November 1, 1966	TBA
10	"The Ringmaster" "Captive of the Circus" "The Grand Finale"	Unknown	Unknown	The Incredible Hulk (vol. 1) #3	November 8, 1966	TBA
11	"Enter Tyrannus" "Beauty and the Beast" "They Dwell in the Depths"	Unknown	Unknown	The Incredible Hulk (vol. 1) #5, Tales to Astonish #80-81	November 15, 1966	TBA
12	"The Terror of the T Gun" "I Against a World" "Bruce Banner Is the Hulk!"	Unknown	Unknown	Tales to Astonish #75-77	November 22, 1966	TBA
13	"The Man Called Boomerang!" "The Hulk Intervenes" "Less than Monster, More than Man!"	Unknown	Unknown	Tales to Astonish #81-83	November 29, 1966	TBA

=== The Invincible Iron Man ===
Episode	Title	Directed by	Written by	Adapted from	Original release date	Prod. code
1	"Double Disaster" "Enter Happy Hogan" "Of Ice and Men"	Grant Simmons	Marvin Woodward	Tales of Suspense (vol. 1) #43, 45	September 7, 1966	16 (MIR6316) 17 (MIR6317) 18 (MIR6318)
2	"The Death of Tony Stark!" "The Hands of the Mandarin" "The Origin of the Mandarin"	Grant Simmons	Robert Bentley	Tales of Suspense (vol. 1) #61, 50, 62	September 14, 1966	7 (MIR6307) 8 (MIR6308) 9 (MIR6309)
3	"Ultimo" "Ultimo Lives" "Crescendo"	Grant Simmons	Don Christensen	Tales of Suspense (vol. 1) #76-78	September 21, 1966	22 (MIR6322) 23 (MIR6323) 24 (MIR6324)
4	"The Mandarin's Revenge!" "The Mandarin's Death Ray" "No One Escapes the Mandarin"	Grant Simmons	Unknown	Tales of Suspense (vol. 1) #54-55	September 28, 1966	1 (MIR6301) 2 (MIR6302) 3 (MIR6303)
5	"The Crimson Dynamo!" "The Crimson Dynamo Strikes" "Captured"	Grant Simmons	Don Christensen	Tales of Suspense (vol. 1) #46, 52	October 5, 1966	13 (MIR6313) 14 (MIR6314) 15 (MIR6315)
6	"Enter Hawkeye" "So Spins the Web" "Triple Jeopardy"	Don Lusk	Don Christensen	Tales of Suspense (vol. 1) #57, 60, 64	October 12, 1966	19 (MIR6319) 20 (MIR6320) 21 (MIR6321)
7	"If I Die, Let It Be with Honor" "A World Is Watching" "What Price Victory?"	Grant Simmons	Don Christensen	Tales of Suspense (vol. 1) #69-71	October 19, 1966	10 (MIR6310) 11 (MIR6311) 12 (MIR6312)
8	"The Moleman Strikes" "The Dragon of the Flames" "Decision Under the Earth"	Grant Simmons	Bill Danch	Original (Note: These stories were later adapted into Tales of Suspense issues #87-88 as the stories "Crisis -- At the Earth's Core!" and "Beyond All Rescue!".)	October 26, 1966	4 (MIR6304) 5 (MIR6305) 6 (MIR6306)
9	"The Other Iron Man!" "Death Duel" "Into the Jaws of the Death!"	Don Lusk	Jim Carmichael	Tales of Suspense (vol. 1) #84-86	November 2, 1966	34 (MIR6334) 35 (MIR6335) 36 (MIR6336)
10	"The Cliffs of Doom!" "The False Captain America" "The Unmasking"	Don Lusk	Don Christensen	Tales of Suspense (vol. 1) #58	November 9, 1966	37 (MIR6337) 38 (MIR6338) 39 (MIR6339)
11	"My Life for Yours" "The Black Knight's Gambit" "The Menace of the Monster"	Don Lusk	Jim Carmichael	Tales of Suspense (vol. 1) #72-76	November 16, 1966	28 (MIR6328) 29 (MIR6329) 30 (MIR6330)
12	"The Dream Master" "If a Man Be Mad" "Duel in Space"	Don Lusk	Jim Carmichael	Tales of Suspense (vol. 1) #67-68	November 23, 1966	25 (MIR6325) 26 (MIR6326) 27 (MIR6327)
13	"Beauty and the Armor" "Peril in Space" "As a City Watches"	Don Lusk	Jim Carmichael	Tales of Suspense (vol. 1) #72, 81-83	November 30, 1966	31 (MIR6321) 32 (MIR6332) 33 (MIR6333)

=== The Mighty Thor ===
Episode	Title	Directed by	Written by	Adapted from	Original release date	Prod. code
1	"Trapped by Loki" "The Vengeance of Loki" "The Defeat of Loki"	Shamus Culhane; Jack Kinney	Jack Kinney	Journey into Mystery #85, 88	September 8, 1966	1 (MTH6501) 2 (MTH6502) 3 (MTH6503)
2	"Chained Evil" "Sandu, Master of the Supernatural" "Enchanted Hammer"	Sid Marcus	Chuck Harriton	Journey into Mystery #92, 91	September 15, 1966	28 (MTH6528) 29 (MTH6529) 30 (MTH6530)
3	"The Enchantress and the Executioner" "Giants Walk the Earth" "Battle of the Gods"	Jack Kinney	Chuck Harriton	Journey into Mystery #103-104	September 22, 1966	31 (MTH6531) 32 (MTH6532) 33 (MTH6533)
4	"At the Mercy of Loki" "Trial of the Gods" "Return to Earth"	Chuck Harriton	Jack Kinney; Jewell Schubel	Journey into Mystery #108, 115-117	September 29, 1966	34 (MTH6534) 35 (MTH6535) 36 (MTH6536)
5	"The Absorbing Man" "In My Hands, This Hammer" "Vengeance of the Thunder God"	Chuck Harriton	Don Christensen	Journey into Mystery #120-122, 115	October 6, 1966	7 (MTH6507) 8 (MTH6508) 9 (MTH659)
6	"To Kill a Thunder God" "The Day of the Destroyer" "Terror of the Tomb"	Chuck Harriton	Don Christensen	Journey into Mystery #117-119	October 13, 1966	13 (MTH6513) 14 (MTH6514) 15 (MTH6515)
7	"The Grey Gargoyle" "The Wrath of Odin" "Triumph in Stone"	Chuck Harriton	Don Christensen	Journey into Mystery #107, 113	October 20, 1966	10 (MTH6510) 11 (MTH6511) 12 (MTH6512)
8	"The Mysterious Mister Hyde" "Revenge of Mr. Hyde" "Thor's Showdown with Mr. Hyde"	Shamus Culhane; Steve Clark	Steve Clark	Journey into Mystery #99-100	October 27, 1966	4 (MTH6504) 5 (MTH6505) 6 (MTH6506)
9	"Every Hand Against Him" "The Power of the Thunder God" "The Power of Odin"	Chuck Harriton	Steve Clark	Journey into Mystery #110-111	November 3, 1966	19 (MTH6519) 20 (MTH6520) 21 (MTH6521)
10	"The Tomorrow Man" "Return of Zarrko" "Slaves of Evil"	Chuck Harriton	Don Christensen	Journey into Mystery #86, 101-102	November 10, 1966	16 (MTH6516) 17 (MTH6517) 18 (MTH6518)
11	"Enter Hercules" "When Meet Immortals" "Whom the Gods Would Destroy"	Chuck Harriton	Jack Kinney	Journey into Mystery #124-125, Thor #126-127	November 17, 1966	22 (MTH6522) 23 (MTH6523) 24 (MTH6524)
12	"The Power of Pluto" "The Verdict of Zeus" "Thunder in the Netherworld"	Chuck Harriton	Sid Marcus	Journey into Mystery #125, Thor #126-130	November 24, 1966	25 (MTH6525) 26 (MTH6526) 27 (MTH6527)
13	"Molto, the Lava Man" "Invasion of the Lava Man" "Living Rock"	Chuck Harriton	Jewell Schubel	Journey into Mystery #97; The Avengers #5	December 1, 1966	37 (MTH6537) 38 (MTH6538) 39 (MTH6539)

=== Prince Namor the Sub-Mariner ===
Title card for a Sub-Mariner episode

Episode	Title	Directed by	Written by	Adapted from	Original release date	Prod. code
1	"Peril in the Surface World" "So Spreads the Net" "The Unveiling"	Unknown	Unknown	Original	September 9, 1966	TBA
2	"The Start of the Quest!" "Escape to Nowhere" "A Prince There Was"	Unknown	Unknown	Tales to Astonish #70-72	September 16, 1966	TBA
3	"Not All My Power Can Save Me!" "When Fails the Quest" "The End of the Quest"	Unknown	Unknown	Tales to Astonish #72-76	September 23, 1966	TBA
4	"Atlantis Under Attack" "The Sands of Terror" "The Iron Idol of Infamy"	Unknown	Unknown	Original	September 30, 1966	TBA
5	"The Thing from Space" "No Escape for Namor" "A Prince Dies Fighting"	Unknown	Unknown	Tales to Astonish #88-89	October 7, 1966	TBA
6	"To Conquer a Crown" "A Prince No More" "He Who Wears the Crown"	Unknown	Unknown	Original	October 14, 1966	TBA
7	"To Walk Amongst Men!" "When Rises the Behemoth" "To the Death"	Unknown	Unknown	Tales to Astonish #77-80	October 21, 1966	TBA
8	"The World Within!" "Atlantis Is Doomed" "Quest for X-Atom"	Unknown	Unknown	Original	October 28, 1966	TBA
9	"Beware the Siren Song" "Spell of Lorelei" "Return of the Mud Beast"	Unknown	Unknown	Original	November 4, 1966	TBA
10	"Ship of Doom" "Fall of Atlantis" "Forces of Vengeance"	Unknown	Unknown	Original	November 11, 1966	TBA
11	"The Planet of Doom" "To Test a Prince" "To Save a Planet"	Unknown	Unknown	Original	November 18, 1966	TBA
12	"Dr. Doom's Day" "The Doomed Allegiance" "Tug of Death"	Unknown	Unknown	Fantastic Four Annual #3; Fantastic Four #6	November 25, 1966	TBA
13	"Let the Stranger Die..!" "To Destroy a Tyrant" "Save A City"	Unknown	Unknown	Original	December 2, 1966	TBA

== Home media ==
=== United States ===
In 1985, Prism Entertainment released several segments from the series on VHS as part of their "Marvel Comics Video Library" series. Best Film & Video Corp. continued this range in the Early-1990s under their "Marvel Video!" imprint. Goldstar Video released two compilation releases which contained three videocassettes each: Marvel Superheroes: Triple Pack #1 (UPC #024543004127) and Marvel's Mightiest Heroes: Triple Pack #2. Fox Video released a version titled Marvel's Mightiest Super Heroes Gift Set (EAN #0024543004134).

In June 2003, a selection of Hulk segments giving his origin story were released as a bonus feature on Buena Vista Home Entertainment's DVD release of The Incredible Hulk (1996).

In September 2004, Buena Vista Home Entertainment announced that they would release a five-DVD set titled "the 60s Superheroes" on June 28, 2005, which would contain all segments from The Marvel Super Heroes Show, each on their own disc. By February 2005, however, Buena Vista announced that the release was off the schedule.

=== United Kingdom ===
In May 2004, Maximum Entertainment released two boxsets that each contained one disc for the Captain America, Iron Man, Sub-Mariner and Thor shows, alongside The Avengers: United They Stand. Both box sets made up all the respective segments from the series. The Hulk segments were not included due to Fox Kids Europe previously sub-licensing them to Buena Vista the year prior. On August 1, 2005, Maximum re-released Iron Man as a two-disc standalone set. On May 21, 2007, Maximum re-released each of the respective segments on separate two-disc sets, with each episode re-edited into continuous, half-hour segments. The sets, alongside the Iron Man set, were later bundled as part of the "Marvel Superheroes Classic Collection" boxset, released in November 2007. In April 2008, a five-disc boxset containing the Iron Man segments with the 1994 series titled "Iron Man - Ultimate Collection" was released. Segments were also included with the standalone Iron Man 1994 DVD releases, which was soon bundled as a boxset titled "Iron Man Collection" on November 24, 2008.

In April 2008, Liberation Entertainment secured the home media rights to select Marvel shows from Jetix Europe in select European territories, including Hulk. On August 25, 2008, the company released a two-disc set of the Hulk segments, re-edited into 13 20-minute episodes, in the United Kingdom and Germany.

After Liberation closed its UK branch at the end of October, Clear Vision took over home media distribution of the Marvel properties. The company first released the Iron Man segments on April 19, 2010 with the 1994 series as a six-disc boxset titled "Iron Man: The Ultimate Collection" in the United Kingdom and on May 3, 2010 and May 7, 2010, they re-released the Hulk sets in the United Kingdom and Germany respectively. In 2011, the company began releasing stand-alone DVD sets of the segments which edited them similarity to the Maximum releases. In 2012, the company released a four-disc set that contained single volumes of the Captain America, Hulk, The Mighty Thor and Iron Man segments respectively, to coincide with the release of Avengers Assemble.
