= Thor: Blood Oath =

Comic book limited series

- Cover of the 1st issue by artist Scott Kolins.

Publication information
- Publisher: Marvel Comics
- Schedule: Monthly
- Format: Limited series
- Genre: Superhero; Mythology
- Publication date: September – December 2005
- No. of issues: 6
- Main character(s): Thor; Warriors Three

Creative team
- Written by: Michael Avon Oeming
- Artist: Scott Kolins
- Letterer: Dave Lanphear
- Colorist: Wil Quintana
- Editor(s): Tom Brevoort; Molly Lazer; Joe Quesada; Aubrey Sitterson

Collected editions
- Hardcover: ISBN 0-7851-2274-5

Thor: Blood Oath is a 6-issue comic book limited series published by Marvel Comics in September to December 2005 and is written by Michael Avon Oeming, with art by Scott Kolins.

The series features Thor and the Warriors Three, and is set in Thor's early years after Journey into Mystery Annual #1 but before Journey Into Mystery #125.

== Publication history ==
When first announced the series was called Thor: Tales of Asgard.

== Plot synopsis ==
After battling the Absorbing Man and successfully defeating him, Thor travels to Asgard where he discovers the Warriors Three are on trial. They accidentally killed a giant who had shape-shifted into an aquatic beast and as punishment they were sentenced to retrieve several difficult items from various pantheons and return them to the father of the dead giant. These include magic apples from the branches of the Asgardian world tree, Yggdrasil, guarded by a giant eagle. The skin of Dionysus' magic pig from Olympus, guarded by Hercules. The spear Slaughter from the Celtic Tuatha De Danaan, guarded by Chulain. The sword Grasscutter from the Japanese land of the dead guarded by Mikaboshi. And finally they must shout their victory from a hill on top of the Egyptian temple of Toth guarded by his three sons. Thor volunteers to go with them, but is forced to not use Mjolnir as a weapon. As they get the items they meet many people including Hercules.

== Collected editions ==
The series was collected into a single volume: Thor: Blood Oath (144 pages, hardcover, March 22 2006, ISBN 0-7851-2274-5, softcover, December 20, 2006, ISBN 0-7851-1852-7)
