= Executioner (character) =

Fictional character in the Marvel Comics universe

The Executioner
- Skurge, the original Executioner, as depicted in Hulk #10 (August 1978). Art by Bob Layton.

Publication information
- Publisher: Marvel Comics
- First appearance: Journey into Mystery #103 (April 1964)
- Created by: Stan Lee (writer); Jack Kirby (artist)

In-story information
- Alter ego: Skurge
- Species: Asgardian Half-giant
- Team affiliations: Masters of Evil; Mandarin's Minions; Legion of the Unliving; Einherjar (warriors of Valhalla); Lethal Legion
- Partnerships: Loki; Enchantress
- Notable aliases: Hans Grubervelt, The Evil One
- Abilities: Superhuman strength, stamina, durability, and visual acuity Extended lifespan Use of enchanted axe

The Executioner is the name of three fictional characters appearing in American comic books published by Marvel Comics.

Skurge, an Asgardian, is originally depicted as a supervillain who wields a magic double-bladed battle axe. Skurge falls in love with the Enchantress and is frequently used in schemes by her and the trickster god Loki. He is a long-time antagonist of Thor and other heroes of the Marvel universe and is a member of the original Masters of Evil. Eventually, he joins the heroes of Asgard in a mission to Hel, where he sacrifices his axe to destroy Naglfar, the ship of the dead, and delays Ragnarok, sacrificing his life to hold the bridge Gjallarbrú so the heroes can escape Hel. After a time trapped in Hel, he joins the honored dead in Valhalla.

The name was later used by two other characters: an axe-wielding android member of the Crazy Gang and a vigilante named Daniel DuBois, the son of Princess Python.

Skurge has made several appearances in media, such as animated television series, video games, and the Marvel Cinematic Universe film Thor: Ragnarok (2017), in which he was portrayed by Karl Urban.

== Publication history ==
The Executioner first appeared in Journey into Mystery #103 (April 1964), and was created by Stan Lee and Jack Kirby.

== Fictional character biography ==
=== Skurge ===
Skurge was born in Jotunheim; he is the son of an unnamed Storm Giant and an unnamed Skornheim goddess, making him a half-giant. He later becomes a warrior, gaining the name Executioner after fighting in a war against the Storm Giants. Skurge has always had feelings for Amora, the Enchantress, and regularly aids her in various evil schemes to gain control of Asgard. However, the Enchantress only manipulates him, using her charms to keep Skurge under her thrall. Loki, the trickster god, also has used Skurge many times.

In his first appearance, the Executioner teams with the Enchantress to battle Thor at the behest of Loki. He exiles Jane Foster to another dimension and tries to get Thor to surrender his hammer to him in exchange for Jane. Thor agrees to this, but when the Enchantress turns Skurge to a tree for bringing Foster back he releases Thor from the bargain, whereupon Thor returns the two to Asgard. The Executioner and the Enchantress are exiled to Earth by Odin, where they learn of Heinrich Zemo from a newspaper. They become members of Zemo's original Masters of Evil and fight the Avengers. The Executioner disguises himself as a former aide of Zemo, and lures Captain America to Zemo's kingdom, while the Enchantress uses her powers to turn Thor against the Avengers. Later the Executioner helps Zemo escape from Captain America by knocking out Captain America.

Once Amora the Enchantress set her sights on Heimdall as a potential lover, Skurge sought to ease the wounds of his heart in battle, joining Thor, Balder, and the Einherjar on a rescue mission in Hel. A group of souls belonging to living humans had been trapped there by Malekith the Accursed, and Hela had refused to permit them to return to Midgard (Earth). Despite initial misgivings, Thor permitted Skurge to accompany the group. Skurge is tempted by Amora, who claims Heimdall had slain her. This was not Amora, but Mordonna, a shapeshifting sorceress in the employ of Hela. The disguise is revealed when Skurge decides to trust Balder more than the desires of his own heart. Hela whisks Mordonna away before Skurge can gain revenge.

Naglfar, the ship of the dead, is nearing ready to sail, and Hela promises Skurge a place of honor beside her on it at the battle of Ragnarok. Enraged at being manipulated, Skurge destroys the ship with his axe. The group is pursued out of Hel, with Skurge sacrificing himself to protect them from Hela. This honorable act of heroism has earned Skurge great respect across Asgard and beyond.

Following his death, Skurge remains in Hel until Thor - currently cursed by Hela with brittle bones - assumes control of the Destroyer and attacks Hela's domain. Skurge attempts to use diplomacy to reach Thor's spirit inside the armor, but is knocked out by Thor. Unknown to all, this is all part of Thor's plan to force Hela to remove the curse, which she does before Thor can destroy Hel. Recognizing Skurge's honor and courage, Hela allows him to depart for Valhalla. Skurge's spirit was briefly summoned from Valhalla by the Grandmaster as a member of the Legion of the Unliving.

=== Brute Benhurst ===
After Skurge's death, Amora gives the Bloodaxe to a mortal called Brute Benhurst, making him a replacement Executioner. Thor initially believes Benhurst to be a resurrected Skurge, as he wore a mask. Thor tries not to fight him until the Executioner attacks Kevin Masterson. Thor recognizes hitting a child as an ignoble thing which Skurge would never do, and defeats Executioner.

=== Crazy Gang ===
The Executioner is a silent android swathed in a long robe and hood and armed with an axe. It follows the commands of the Red Queen and seems to lack any real intelligence.

=== Daniel DuBois ===
A character named The Executioner (Daniel DuBois) appears in Dark Reign: Young Avengers. He is described as "a rich and organized urban vigilante who hunts and kills criminal scum. And likes to hurt pets." It is later revealed that this Executioner is the son of Princess Python, and knows Kate Bishop from school, and is aware of her secret identity, knowledge that he uses to try to blackmail his way onto the team.

== Powers and abilities ==
Skurge possessed the superhuman abilities of a typical male Asgardian. Due to his unique hybrid physiology, with a half Storm Giant and half Skornheimian pedigree, Skurge's physical strength, stamina and durability were considerably greater than those of the average Asgardian male. He also possessed superhuman visual acuity. Skurge was extremely long-lived, aging at a much slower pace than human beings, though not truly immortal. His body was highly resistant to physical damage, and he was immune to terrestrial diseases, toxins, and some magic. In the event of injury, Skurge's godly life force would allow him to recover with a superhuman rate. Skurge had proficiency at hand-to-hand combat, and mastery of most Asgardian weapons. He would often fight wielding his large, enchanted, double-bladed battle axe that allowed him a number of abilities including cutting rifts into other dimensions and control over fire and ice that he could project at his enemies. Skurge also sometimes wore an enchanted impregnable horned helmet that completely covered his head. In his first appearance, Skurge demonstrated a 'super-human falcon hunting vision' that enabled him to find Jane Foster in a crowd.

The second Executioner is a vigilante with no super powers.

== Other versions ==
An alternate universe version of the Executioner from Earth-238 appears in Marvel Super-Heroes #377 as a servant of Mad Jim Jaspers.

== In other media ==
=== Television ===
- Skurge the Executioner appears in The Marvel Super Heroes, voiced by Henry Comor.
- Skurge appears in The Super Hero Squad Show episode "Mental Organism Designed Only for Kisses!", voiced by Travis Willingham.
- Skurge the Executioner makes non-speaking appearances in The Avengers: Earth's Mightiest Heroes as a member of the Masters of Evil.
- Skurge the Executioner appears in Ultimate Spider-Man, voiced again by Travis Willingham.
- Skurge the Executioner appears in Avengers Assemble, voiced again by Travis Willingham. This version is a member of the Cabal.

=== Film ===
Skurge the Executioner appears in Hulk vs. Thor.

=== Marvel Cinematic Universe ===
Karl Urban as Skurge in Thor: Ragnarok

Skurge appears in media set in the Marvel Cinematic Universe, portrayed by Karl Urban.

- First appearing in Thor: Ragnarok, this version replaced Heimdall as the guardian of the Bifrost and wields two M16 rifles that he acquired from Texas. Following Hela's takeover of Asgard, she recruits Skurge and dubs him her Executioner. Skurge later reconsiders his actions and sacrifices himself to protect Asgard.
- An alternate universe version of Skurge makes a non-speaking cameo appearance in the What If...? episode "What If... Thor Were an Only Child?".

=== Video games ===
- The Executioner appears as a boss in Marvel: Ultimate Alliance, voiced by Peter Lurie. This version is a member of Doctor Doom's Masters of Evil.
- The Executioner appears as a boss in Marvel Avengers Alliance.
- The Executioner appears as a playable character in Marvel: Future Fight.
