= Marvel Animated Features =

American direct to DVD series of animated films by MLG Productions

- Cover art for the Marvel Animated Features 8-Film Complete Collection
- Directed by: Jamie Simone (voice)
- Based on: Characters published by Marvel Comics
- Produced by: Craig Kyle, Supervising; Executive: Avi Arad; Kevin Feige; Eric S. Rollman; Craig Kyle; Stan Lee, Co-Executive
- Edited by: George P. Rizkallah
- Music by: Guy Michelmore
- Production company: MLG Productions
- Distributed by: Lionsgate
- Release date: February 21, 2006 – May 17, 2011
- Country: United States
- Language: English

Marvel Animated Features (MAF) is a series of eight American direct-to-video animated superhero films made by MLG Productions, a joint venture between Marvel Studios (later Marvel Animation) and Lions Gate Entertainment.

== History ==
In 2004, Marvel Entertainment, Marvel Comics' new parent corporation, struck a deal with Lions Gate Entertainment to produce a series of eight to ten direct-to-video animated films under the name of Marvel Animated Features in conjunction with Marvel Studios, Marvel's direct film subsidiary.

The first two features, Ultimate Avengers: The Movie and Ultimate Avengers 2: Rise of the Panther, were released February 2006 and August 2006 respectively. As of November 2006, UA and UA2 combined had sold over 1.5 million units and both were in the top 10 children's releases for the year.

After the pair of Ultimate Avengers (UA) DVDs, the next MAF film, The Invincible Iron Man, was released in January 2007. As of January 2007, Doctor Strange: The Sorcerer Supreme was slated next for summer 2007 with the tentatively titled Teen Avengers under early development. Originally, the MAF were being released two per year until Doctor Strange: The Sorcerer Supreme; while it was an Annie Awards nominee for "Best Home Entertainment Production" of 2007, it only sold half the number of DVD as either UA feature. After which, the MAFs releases were slowed to one per year.

Marvel Animation was incorporated in January 2008 to direct Marvel's efforts in animation and home entertainment markets, including Marvel Animation Features.

A proposed Ultimate War/Thor dual film DVD was passed over for the 2009 released Hulk vs. dual film DVD. Ultimate War would have adapted the Ultimate Marvel comic book of the same name, whilst the Thor film would have selected Walt Simonson's "Thor" storyline (the original selection being a Beta Ray Bill story).

At the 2009 NATPE Conference, Lionsgate brought the eight Marvel Features to the TV market.

Most of the films have a PG-13 rating, but one of them has a PG rating.

== Films ==
Film	U.S. release date	Director(s)	Screenwriter(s)	Producer(s)	Music	Runtime
Ultimate Avengers: The Movie	February 21, 2006	Bob Richardson (supervising) (executive) Curt Geda; Steven E. Gordon; Han Tae-Ho (animation)	Greg Johnson (screenplay); story: Boyd Kirkland; Craig Kyle; Greg Johnson	Bob Richardson	Ken McLeod (direction)	72 minutes
Ultimate Avengers 2: Rise of the Panther	August 8, 2006	Bob Richardson; Will Meugniot; Richard Sebast; Jamie Simone (voice)	Craig Kyle	Craig Kyle (executive)	David Ari Leon (direction)	73 minutes
The Invincible Iron Man	January 23, 2007	Patrick Archibald; Jay Oliva; Frank Paur (supervising)	Greg Johnson (screenplay); Story: Greg Johnson; Avi Arad; Craig Kyle	Frank Paur; Craig Kyle (executive)	David Ari Leon (supervisor)	83 minutes
Doctor Strange: The Sorcerer Supreme	August 14, 2007	Patrick Archibald; Richard Sebast; Jay Oliva; Frank Paur (supervising)	Greg Johnson (screenplay); Story: Greg Johnson; Craig Kyle	Frank Paur; Craig Kyle (executive)	David Ari Leon (supervisor)	76 minutes
Next Avengers: Heroes of Tomorrow	September 2, 2008	Jay Oliva; Isamitsu Kashima (animation); Jamie Simone (voice); Gary Hartle (supervising)	Christopher Yost (screenplay); Greg Johnson; Craig Kyle (story)	Craig Kyle; Gary Hartle	David Ari Leon (direction/ supervision)	78 minutes
Hulk vs.	January 27, 2009	Frank Paur (supervising); Sam Liu	Craig Kyle; Chris Yost	Craig Kyle; Frank Paur	David Ari Leon (direction/ supervision)	78 minutes: 45 minutes (Hulk vs. Thor); 33 minutes (Hulk vs. Wolverine)
Planet Hulk	February 2, 2010	Sam Liu	Greg Johnson	Joshua Fine; Craig Kyle; Frank Paur	David Ari Leon (direction/ supervision)	81 minutes
Thor: Tales of Asgard	May 17, 2011	Gary Hartle (supervising); Sam Liu (animation)	Greg Johnson (screenplay); story: Greg Johnson; Craig Kyle	Craig Kyle	David Ari Leon (direction/ supervision)	77 minutes

=== Ultimate Avengers: The Movie ===
Ultimate Avengers: The Movie (also known simply as Ultimate Avengers) is the first film in the Marvel Animated Features based loosely on the first six issues of the Ultimates by Mark Millar and Bryan Hitch. The film was released on February 21, 2006, and produced by DongWoo Animation. The film focuses on Captain America, a super soldier who was frozen in ice for decades after stopping a Nazi/extraterrestrial plot in 1945. The Captain is assigned to lead a team of heroes (also consisting of Iron Man, Thor, Giant-Man, Wasp, Black Widow, and Hulk), found by Nick Fury of S.H.I.E.L.D, to fight the alien Chitauri.

=== Ultimate Avengers 2: Rise of the Panther ===
Ultimate Avengers 2: Rise of the Panther, is the second film in the series and a sequel to Ultimate Avengers: The Movie, produced by Dong Woo Animation. The film was released on August 8, 2006. In the film, the Black Panther teams up with the Ultimate Avengers to continue their fight against the Chitauri when they invade Africa.

Hawkeye, Quicksilver, and Scarlet Witch were not in the initial Ultimate Avengers film and were originally planned to be in the sequel. Using Hawkeye as an example, Marvel Animation vice president Craig Kyle did not want him to be a background character, but stated that "he's going to matter" if he appeared.

=== The Invincible Iron Man ===
The Invincible Iron Man is the third film in the series and is based on the classic Marvel Universe version by Stan Lee and Jack Kirby. The film was produced by Starburst Entertainment and was released on January 23, 2007. Marc Worden returns as Tony Stark/Iron Man from the Ultimate Avengers films. In The Invincible Iron Man, Tony Stark, billionaire manufacturer, finds a lost Chinese city where he accidentally unleashes an evil powerful force. Stark creates a powerful weaponized combat armor to become Iron Man and defeat the Mandarin.

=== Doctor Strange: The Sorcerer Supreme ===
Doctor Strange: The Sorcerer Supreme (titled on-screen as Doctor Strange) is the fourth film in the series and is based on the character of the same name by Stan Lee and Steve Ditko, separate from the Ultimate Avengers universe. The film was released on August 14, 2007, and was nominated for "Best Home Entertainment Production" of 2007 for the 35th Annual Annie Awards. Doctor Strange: The Sorcerer Supreme tells the story of Stephen Strange, a bitter and arrogant neurosurgeon who falls victim to a car crash that injures the nerves in his hands, such that he can no longer perform surgery. Looking for a cure, Strange instead finds a different and higher pursuit as the new Sorcerer Supreme, master of the mystical arts.

=== Next Avengers: Heroes of Tomorrow ===
Next Avengers: Heroes of Tomorrow, tentatively titled Teen Avengers then Avengers Reborn, is the fifth film in the Marvel Animated Features, and was released on September 2, 2008. With the loss of their Avengers parents at the hands of Ultron and raised by billionaire bachelor Tony Stark/Iron Man, four orphaned teens, James Rogers (son of Captain America and Black Widow), Torunn (daughter of Thor and Sif), Henry Pym Jr. (son of Ant-Man and Wasp), and Azari (son of Black Panther and Storm), must live up to their parents' legacy and defeat Ultron, the robot who killed them. Additional allies are recruited including Vision, Hulk, and Francis Barton (son of Hawkeye and Mockingbird).

=== Hulk vs. ===
Hulk vs. is a double-feature film released on DVD and Blu-Ray on January 27, 2009, and the sixth in the series. The two features are Hulk vs. Thor and Hulk vs. Wolverine. In Hulk vs. Thor, Thor's villainous half-brother Loki teams up with the Enchantress to separate the Hulk and his alter ego, Bruce Banner, and use the former as a weapon. In Hulk vs. Wolverine, Wolverine is sent to deal with Hulk, but both are captured and must deal with Weapon X.

Hulk vs. Wolverine is based on The Incredible Hulk #181 by Roy Thomas, Len Wein, and John Romita Sr. Hulk vs. was selected over a proposed Ultimate War/Thor double feature film. Writer and producer Christopher Yost confirmed that both films share continuity with Wolverine and the X-Men, The Avengers: Earth's Mightiest Heroes, and Thor: Tales of Asgard. The film was produced by Madhouse. The DVD was originally called Hulk Smash and intended to be released in October 2008.

=== Planet Hulk ===
Planet Hulk is the seventh film in the series. It was released on February 2, 2010 as a Two-Disc Special Edition DVD, Special Edition Blu-ray, Standard DVD, and Digital Download. The film is based on the Planet Hulk story line in the comic book published in 2006–2007 by writer Greg Pak and artist Carlo Pagulayan. Notable divergences from the original comic show Beta Ray Bill taking Silver Surfer's place as Hulk's first opponent in the gladiatorial ring, as well as the Red King's Royal Guard being replaced with Death's Head troopers. Also, the ending indicates that Hulk's marriage with Caiera and his ascendance to King of Sakaar, as well as the Warbound becoming his Royal Guard, to be lasting, with no sign of any development mirroring World War Hulk being featured.

=== Thor: Tales of Asgard ===
Thor: Tales of Asgard is the eighth and final film in the series. The film was released on May 17, 2011, and follows a young Thor who looks to prove his worth as a man and a warrior. To this end, he enlists his half-brother Loki and the Warriors Three (Fandral, Hogun, and Volstagg) to retrieve a sword hidden in the realm of Jotunheim. However, their journey runs the risk of reigniting a long-dormant war between Asgard and Jotunheim. The film takes place in the same universe as Hulk vs., Wolverine and the X-Men, and The Avengers: Earth's Mightiest Heroes and serves as a prequel to all three. The film was produced by The Answer Studio.

== Cast and characters ==
Character	Ultimate Avengers	Ultimate Avengers 2	Invincible Iron Man	Doctor Strange	Next Avengers: Heroes of Tomorrow	Hulk Versus	Planet Hulk	Thor
Algrim								Ron Halder
Ancient One				Michael Yama				
Azari					Dempsey Pappion			
Balder						Michael Adamthwaite		
Francis Barton					Adrian Petriw			
Beta Ray Bill							Paul Dobson	
Black Panther		Jeffrey D. Sams						
Black Widow	Olivia D'Abo	Olivia D'Abo						
Bruce Banner	Michael Massee	Michael Massee			Ken Kramer	Bryce Johnson		
Caiera							Lisa Ann Beley	
Captain America	Justin Gross	Justin Gross						
Wong-Chu			James Sie					
Deadpool						Nolan North		
Dormammu				Jonathan Adams				
Enchantress						Kari Wahlgren		Ashleigh Ball
Fandral						Jonathan Holmes		Alistair Abell
Fenris								Brian Drummond
Nick Fury	André Ware	André Ware						
Giant Man	Nolan North	Nolan North						
Hela						Janyse Jaud		
Hiroim							Liam O'Brien	
Hogun						Paul Dobson		Paul Dobson
Hulk	Fred Tatasciore	Fred Tatasciore			Fred Tatasciore	Fred Tatasciore	Rick D. Wasserman	
Iron Man	Marc Worden	Marc Worden	Marc Worden		Tom Kane		Marc Worden	
Elloe Kaifi							Advah Soudack	
Herr Kleiser	Jim Ward	Jim Ward						
Korg							Kevin Michael Richardson	
Lady Deathstrike						Janyse Jaud		
Loki						Graham McTavish		Rick Gomez
Mandarin			Fred Tatasciore					
Miek							Sam Vincent	
Baron Mordo				Kevin Michael Richardson				
Odin						French Tickner		Christopher Britton
Omega Red						Colin Murdock		
Pepper Potts			Elisa Gabrielli					
Henry Pym Jr.					Aidan Drummond			
Red King							Mark Hildreth	
James Rogers					Noah Crawford			
Betty Ross	Nan McNamara	Nan McNamara			Nicole Oliver	Nicole Oliver		
Sabretooth						Mark Acheson		
Lavin Skee							Michael Kopsa	
Sif						Grey DeLisle		Tara Strong
Howard Stark			John McCook					
Doctor Strange				Bryce Johnson				
Thor	David Boat	David Boat			Michael Adamthwaite	Matthew Wolf		Matthew Wolf
Professor Thorton						Tom Kane		
Torunn					Brenna O'Brien			
Ultron					Tom Kane			
Valkyrie						Nicole Oliver		Cathy Weseluck
Vision					Shawn MacDonald			
Volstagg						Jay Brazeau		Brent Chapman
War Machine			Rodney Saulsberry					
Wasp	Grey DeLisle	Grey DeLisle						
Wolverine						Steve Blum		
Wong				Paul Nakauchi				

== Reception ==
=== Critical reaction ===
==== Ultimate Avengers: The Movie ====
Felix Vasquez Jr. of Cinema Crazed said, "It gave me what I wanted, in terms of entertainment, acting, animation, and sheer style…" Jeffrey M. Anderson of Common Sense Media called it an "average animated action tale [that] features troubled superheroes." David Cornelius of eFilmCritic.com said, "It's too violent for younger viewers, but not mature enough for older ones. It's a movie trapped in between target audiences."

==== Ultimate Avengers 2: Rise of the Black Panther ====
Felix Vasquez Jr. of Cinema Crazed said, "If this story doesn't widen its ideas, it's going to get much worse…" Jeffrey M. Anderson of Common Sense Media said, "[This] downbeat superhero story has less character, more violence." Marc Kandel of eFilmCritic.com said, "Turns out the sequel's just as bland as the first."

==== The Invincible Iron Man ====
David Cornelius of eFilmCritic.com said, "It's enough to tide fans over until the live action flick arrives." Todd Gilchrist of IGN said that "there are some great details that really bring this story to life," concluding that the film is "not quite invincible, but for a film about a guy made out of iron, it's pretty tough." Mike Pinsky of DVD Verdict said "the first act takes a very long time to get going," "the villains have no personality whatsoever," and "the art design and animation frame rate are really no better than the average television cartoon." Pinsky added that "there are some nice touches" and "the third act does generate some suspense," but concluded that "given all these obstacles, I don't know if even Iron Man could win this battle." Todd Douglass Jr. of DVD Talk said, "I enjoyed watching The Invincible Iron Man, but it didn't open any new doors for me as an Iron Man fan. From the start the story was pretty straightforward and predictable, though a few twists kept the adventure exciting along the way. Some of the character development also felt kind of forced to me with things simply happening for no reason other than to further the plot." Douglass concluded, "In the end, The Invincible Iron Man should be considered an achievement by comic book fans. The solid adventure features a lot of action and a rich comic book atmosphere that will leave you wanting more DVDs just like it."

==== Doctor Strange: The Sorcerer Supreme ====
Christopher Monfette of IGN said the film "plays out as expected" and has "[a] middle section [that] sags," but features "action sequences [that are] beautifully choreographed and emotionally resonant," and concluded that "strong animation, good acting, and resonant character work bring the icon to life." Adam Arseneau of DVD Verdict said the film "fails to live up to its narrative potential" and criticized the "rushed ending," but praised its "sharp animation" and described the DVD as a "solid rental." Nick Lyons of DVD Talk said that "the visuals are engaging," but criticized the film for "dramatically alter[ing]" the character, saying: "Instead of characterizing Stephen Strange as a cocky, personable, confident jackass like in the comic books he has been reduced to an emo wimp with a useless tacked-on backstory about the death of his sister. The lifeless voice work by Bryce Johnson doesn't help the character, either." Lyons concluded, "Comic book fans looking for a faithful adaptation of Dr. Strange will sadly be disappointed by this animated feature. For a superior Marvel animated movie, I'd advise checking out the first Ultimate Avengers. "

==== Next Avengers: Heroes of Tomorrow ====
Felix Vasquez Jr. of Cinema Crazed said, "[This is] the antithesis of what should be done to grab new demographics." Nancy Davis Kho of Common Sense Media called it a "rollicking young superhero tale." David Cornelius of DVD Talk called it, "Another batch of lost opportunities for Marvel." Felix Gonzalez Jr. of DVD Review said, "With by-the-numbers characters and only a marginally interesting setup, however, even younger viewers may grow impatient as the film makes its way to a pretty good climax."

==== Hulk vs. ====
===== Hulk vs. Thor =====
Cindy White of IGN stated, "Rather than the wild, forest landscapes of Canada, this one deals with the stately architecture of Asgard, and there are a lot more characters. Being less familiar with Thor as a series, some of the shout-outs to the comics were lost on me, for the most part, but I'm sure Thor fans will appreciate them. Todd Douglass Jr. of DVD Talk said, "In Hulk vs. Thor the plot is a little more calculated and it feels balanced by comparison." and actually like the battles "One of the joys of Hulk vs. Thor was watching the monster tear his way across Odin's world. Nothing can stand in his way and there are many outstanding moments and fight scenes peppered throughout the film." Kerry Birmingham of DVD Verdict stated, "Kyle and Yost have less of an affinity for Thor, and it shows; their Thor script, despite its violence, lacks the glee of the Wolverine installment. In approaching Thor's Hulk as a raging counterpart to Wolverine's more reactive, childlike Hulk, the creators commendably draw a distinction between their interpretations of the character, but the Asgard throw down is simply less fun than its more gonzo counterpart."

===== Hulk vs. Wolverine =====
Cindy White of IGN said, "The benefits of a direct-to-DVD project like this is that the creators didn't have to shy away from the kind of gore that would be unacceptable for a Saturday-morning audience" commenting on how Wolverine uses his claws on a living entity and not just on robots as in other animated features. Todd Douglass Jr. of DVD Talk described it as fast-paced, but criticized the Weapon X backstory as "a bit out of place" and said it "also takes away from the Hulk versus Wolverine storyline." Kerry Birmingham of DVD Verdict stated, "The most immediately successful of the two is Wolverine, enlivened by a punchier script than its Norse cousin. Craig Kyle and Chris Yost, screenwriters for both episodes, are veteran comic book writers and well-versed in the world of the X-Men, and as such seem to have injected Wolverine with a bit more energy."

==== Planet Hulk ====
Felix Vasquez Jr. of Cinema Crazed said, "All in all strong voice work tops what is a truly entertaining installment from the Marvel animated film gallery." Rick Marshall of MTV said, "In the end, Planet Hulk is a fun film that should prove entertaining for mainstream audiences and fans of the character. Marvel Studios and Lionsgate are headed in the right direction with their animated features, and Planet Hulk feels like another step forward."

==== Thor: Tales of Asgard ====
Brian Costello of Common Sense Media criticized the film for its use of violence, drinking, and sexual innuendo. Cindy White of IGN gave it a 7.0 out of 10 stating, "When it comes to content made just for DVD, DC and Warner Bros. have consistently edged out Marvel with their series of original animated movies, in quality of storytelling as well as animation. There's nothing about Thor: Tales of Asgard that reverses that trend". Kofi Outlaw of Screen Rant said "All in all, Tales of Asgard is an enjoyable Thor adventure -- even with the titular character reduced to teen age. It's not necessarily one of those animated features you'll want to watch over and over again, but if you're a collector of every Marvel animated movie released, or are looking for an entertaining superhero adventure to rent, definitely check it out". James O'Ehley of Sci-Fi Movie Page said, "Don't judge this DVD by its cover: the movie might as well be called Young Thor or I Was a Teenaged Norse Deity."

=== Sales ===
Year	Film	Number	Gross (US$M sales)	Units (US sales)	Refs.
2006	Ultimate Avengers	1	$6.7	>500,000	
2006	Ultimate Avengers 2	2	$7.9	<600,000	
2007	The Invincible Iron Man	3	$5.3		
2007	Doctor Strange: The Sorcerer Supreme	4	$3.9		
2008	Next Avengers: Heroes of Tomorrow	5	$3.8		
2009	Hulk vs.	6	$7.6	>400,000	
2010	Planet Hulk	7	$7.0		
2011	Thor: Tales of Asgard	8	$3.1		
Totals:			$43.5		

Official site	Marvel's site	IMDb	Rotten Tomatoes	Other
Ultimate Avengers	MVL page	IMDb	RT page	Y! page
Ultimate Avengers 2	none	IMDb	RT page	Movies.com
Invincible Iron Man	Marvel	IMDb	RT page	
Doctor Strange	Marvel	IMDb	RT page	
Next Avengers	none	IMDb	RT page	
Hulk vs.	Marvel	IMDb	none	All Movie
Planet Hulk	Marvel	IMDb	RT page	The-Numbers.com
Thor: Tales of Asgard	Thor-DVD.com	IMDb	RT page	The-Numbers.com
