= Alistair Abell =

Canadian actor

- Occupations: Actor; producer; director
- Years active: 1992–present

Alistair Abell is a Canadian actor, producer and director who works in Vancouver, British Columbia, Canada. He has voiced several roles in anime, most notably Colin MacLeod in Highlander: The Search for Vengeance and Lord Djibril in Gundam Seed Destiny. He has also worked in video games such as Electronic Arts' SSX 3, and SSX On Tour (Psymon Stark).

== Filmography ==
=== Live ===
- Batwoman (TV series) (TV) as Mason (Season 3 Episode 2 Loose Tooth)
- Freddy vs. Jason as Deputy Goodman
- His and Her Christmas (TV movie)
- The New Addams Family (TV) as Stanley
- Stargate SG-1 (TV) as Jayem Seran (Season 10, Episode 16)

=== Voice-acting ===
- .hack//Roots (TV) as Sakisaka
- 007 Racing (VG) as Georgi Koskov
- Boys Over Flowers (TV) as Akira Mimiasaka
- Barbie and the Three Musketeers as Musketeer #1 / Royal Announcer
- Barbie in A Mermaid Tale as Remo / Pufferazzi
- Barbie in A Mermaid Tale 2 as Remo / Pufferazzi / Surfer Alistair
- Barbie Mariposa as Lord Gastrous
- Black Lagoon (TV) as Luak
- Bratz: Super Babyz as The Store Manager
- The Daichis - Earth Defence Family (TV) as Public Announcer, Fighter Pilot
- Death Note - Shawn Dunleavy / Ill Ratt, Student (Episode 9)
- Def Jam Vendetta (VG) as Additional Voices
- Diary of a Wimpy Kid as Reporter
- Dragon Ball Z (TV) as Teen/Future Trunks (Vancouver dub); Sharpner (Vancouver dub)
- Dragon Drive (TV) as Yakou
- Dynasty Warriors: Gundam 2 (VG) as Astonaige Medoz (English version)
- Elemental Gelade as Lieutenant Cruz
- Galaxy Angel (TV)
- Galaxy Angel Z (TV) as Bully; Patrick
- G.I. Joe: Valor vs. Venom as Ace
- Highlander: The Search for Vengeance (movie) as Colin MacLeod
- Human Crossing (TV) as Chef; Yoshi
- Inuyasha (TV) as Hakkaku
- Inuyasha: The Final Act (TV) as Hakkaku, Kinka, Kāo (the Flower Prince in English)
- Iron Man: Armored Adventures (TV) as Happy Hogan, Black Knight
- Marvel Nemesis: Rise of the Imperfects (VG) as Spider-Man
- Mary-Kate and Ashley in Action! (TV) as Additional Voices
- Mobile Suit Gundam Seed Destiny (TV) as Lord Djibril
- Mobile Suit Gundam 00 (TV) as Ming, Klaus Grad
- Ranma ½ as Sotatsu
- Santa Mouse and the Ratdeer as Lousy
- Sausage Party as Mariachi Salsa, Gelfite Fish
- Shakugan no Shana (TV) as Eita Tanaka (Season 1)
- SSX on Tour (VG) as Psymon
- Star Ocean EX (TV) as Dr. Bowman Jean
- The Little Prince (2010) (TV) as Shin-Joh (episodes 3 and 4, B 311, the Planet of the Firebird)
- Thor: Tales of Asgard as Fandral
- Transformers: Energon (TV) as Prowl

=== Producer ===
- The Little Things
- Road Kill
- Sol Goode
- Swap

=== Voice Director ===
- Dead Rising 2: Case 0 (VG)
- Dead Rising 2: Case West (VG)
- Dead Rising 2: Off the Record (VG)
- Puzzle Fighter

=== Casting Director ===
- Marley & Me: The Puppy Years

Walla Group:

- Black Light
- The Charlie Da Clown Show
- Dead Rising: Watchtower

Special Thanks:

- At Lunchtime: A Story of Love
- The Beast of Bottomless Lake
- Pits
- Taming Tammy
