= Mitch Lewis =

Canadian multi-instrumentalist (born 1954)

- Birth name: Mitchell Lewis
- Born: September 30, 1954 (age 70); Toronto, Ontario, Canada
- Genres: Rock, folk, R&B, soul, jazz, children's, film
- Occupation(s): Musician, composer
- Instruments: Guitar, steel guitar, bass guitar, drums, percussion
- Years active: 1974–present

Mitchell "Mitch" Lewis (born September 30, 1954, in Toronto, Ontario, Canada) is a Canadian multi-instrumentalist who has been continuously active in the music industry in a variety of genres since 1974.

== Career ==
Lewis' career began in 1974 when a fellow musician paid for his union entrance to have him play on his record. Since then, he has performed or recorded with hundreds of musicians from all over the world and travels extensively for both. As a youth he played with jazz flautist Jane Bunnett, and more recently, has performed with jazz pianist Robi Botos. A shortlist of musicians he has performed or recorded with includes: John Hammond Jr., Eddie "Cleanhead" Vinson, Peter Noone, Johnny Paycheck, Eric Andersen, David Rea, Murray McLauchlan, Sylvia Tyson, Valdy, Jackie Washington and Harry Manx. For film, he was hired to do guitar arrangements for Hollywoodland, starring Ben Affleck, and has worked for Atom Egoyan. He coached Channing Tatum on guitar for The Vow, and Jessica Chastain on bass for Mama. Lewis was also house drummer and multi-instrumentalist for London Home County Music Fest for over eight years, played drums on a tour of Japan with Little Jimmy Bowskill and played guitar with Jon Lord of Deep Purple.

== Discography ==
=== As session musician ===
- Ron Nigrini: "Above the Noise" OA1201 – "Songs From Turtle Island", OA1202 – "Recordings 1975/1976" (no number)
- Rachel Kane: "Groundwire", RK0001 – "All in a Dream", RK0002
- Emigre: Self-titled, Attic Records LAT 1066, 1979.
- Mark Haines and Tom Leighton: Optimists, Jig HL0297 – "Hand to Hand", BCD136 – "Foot to Floor", HL1292
- Tom Leighton: Leighton Tendencies (no number)
- Sophia Perlman and The Vipers: "Once Smitten", SPV07 – "The Vipers", (no number)
- Chuck Jackson's Big Bad Blues Band: A Cup of Joe: A Tribute to Big Joe Turner, LINUS 270147, 2012
- Caitlin Hanford: Bluer Skies, CAN9027
- Raffi: Raffi in Concert with the Rise and Shine Band, MCAD10035
- The Canadian Aces: Live at Alberts Hall, PACE 058
- Kenny "Blues Boss" Wayne: 88th and Jump St., Electro-Fi 3371
- Doc Fingers and his Real Gone Rhythm: "In The Pink", DF006
- Friskey Brown: "Sweet and Slow"
- Handsome Dewey and the Swag: "Diamonds and Gasoline"
- Live at the Reservoir Lounge (Compilation)
- 2B3: The Toronto Sessions, 2004
- Danny Brooks: Soulsville – Souled Out 'n Sanctified, HIS House Records, 2004
- Michal Hasek and Sundog: "Naja", (recorded 1974)
