= Warriors Three =

Group of characters in Marvel Comics

- Variant cover to Thor #4 (November 2007). Art by Olivier Coipel, featuring the Warriors Three (clockwise from top: Volstagg, Hogun, and Fandral).

Publication information
- Publisher: Marvel Comics
- First appearance: Journey into Mystery #119 (August 1965)
- Created by: Stan Lee; Jack Kirby

In-story information
- Base(s): Asgard
- Member(s): Fandral; Hogun; Volstagg; Hildegarde

The Warriors Three are a group of fictional characters appearing in American comic books published by Marvel Comics. The characters served as supporting cast members in Thor. The Warriors Three are the Asgardians Fandral, Hogun, and Volstagg. Though the characters are gods of Asgard, they are original creations of Marvel Comics and not based on characters from Norse mythology.

The Warriors Three have appeared in various media adaptations of Thor, including the 2011 Marvel Cinematic Universe film Thor, its 2013 sequel Thor: The Dark World, and the 2017 sequel Thor: Ragnarok. They appear as archival footage in Thor: Love and Thunder.

== Publication history ==
Fandral, Hogun, and Volstagg first appeared in Journey into Mystery #119 (Aug 1965) and were created by Stan Lee and Jack Kirby. They are first referred to as the "Warriors Three" not in a story, but in the letters page of Thor #244 (February 1976).

Although not based on mythological Norse characters, they were each inspired by a different source, Fandral being based on actor Errol Flynn, Hogun based on actor Charles Bronson, and Volstagg being modeled after Shakespeare's Falstaff.

The Warriors Three were the stars in issue #30 of the tryout series Marvel Spotlight. Though it did not result in the characters getting their own series, the comedy-oriented issue became a fan favorite and has been cited by writer Len Wein as one of his favorite stories: "It was just such a joy to write, and the late, great John Buscema's artwork didn't exactly hurt it no-how."

In late 2010 (with cover dates January–April 2011), the Warriors Three got their own four-issue mini-series, written by Bill Willingham and illustrated by Neil Edwards.

== Fictional biography ==
The Warriors Three have played a supporting role in Marvel's Thor title since the late 1960s.

Volstagg and the Warriors Three were introduced in a "Tales of Asgard" filler in Journey into Mystery #119 (August 1965), which primarily followed Thor's Asgardian adventures. As originally envisioned by Jack Kirby, Volstagg was a huge, bumbling oaf much given to boasting and bragging: the last into battle and the first to claim victory (usually undeserved). Referring to himself as "The Lion of Asgard", he usually causes more problems than he solves and seems totally unaware of the chaos that follows in his wake. Volstagg, Fandral, and Hogun are initially recruited by Loki, but quickly ally with Thor instead.

Following a brief hiatus towards the end of the seventies, Volstagg underwent a renaissance of sorts when Walt Simonson took over The Mighty Thor in 1982. Reaching back to Kirby's initial concept, Simonson redefined Volstagg as a big, likeable bear of a man, a friend to all with a song in their heart (and a glass in their hand). A good-natured old warrior somewhat past his prime, Volstagg is still held in high regard by his comrades, if only for his amusing company and unparalleled drinking ability. Simonson also added another dimension previously unseen in his earlier incarnations — a household full of children.

In the limited series Thor: Blood Oath (published in 2005, but chronologically set earlier), Thor and the Warriors Three are sent on a quest as penance for accidentally killing an enemy giant during a time of peace. Although they fail in their quest, through the use of each warrior's unique capabilities, the adventure eventually comes to a good end.

The group is allied with the earth-bound group the New Mutants. During the mutants' first trip to Asgard, they drank and celebrated with Roberto da Costa (Sunspot). During the group's second visit, the Three encounter new members of the group and do not find their story of Hela's plan to kill Odin believable. Volstagg's children do and free the group, helping them on their way. Boom Boom, Warlock and Hrimhari rescue the Three from Queen Ula and her hive. Hrimhari's honor is enough to convince the Three and Ula to join in on the attempt to defeat Hela. Other Asgardians join in on the fight and soon, Odin is saved.

Another Fanfare issue focused on the wife of Ulik. Despite the many attacks by Ulik against Asgardians, his wife feels she has nowhere else to go when she thinks her husband is in trouble. Hogun wants nothing to do with her, but Volstagg convinces him to at least consult with Fandral. The conclusion of the story has Ulik yet again attacking.

=== Ragnarok ===
When Loki brings Ragnarök on Asgard, Fandral and Hogun are killed by an arrow storm launched from the deck of the flying ship Naglfar. Volstagg survives and is discovered by Thor hiding inside a statue, emaciated and frail. Nevertheless, he would fight on with the army Thor had raised. Ragnarok destroys all of Asgard and all the people residing there, apparently killing Volstagg.

=== Rebirth ===
Thor has resurfaced in the Midwest of the United States of America and has vowed to find Odin and all other Asgardians, who are hidden in human form across Earth. After finding Heimdall, Thor discovers the Warriors Three inhabiting the bodies of three volunteer guards for the Umeme Mungu Refugee Camp in Africa. The trio are restored to their true forms.

Volstagg is later responsible for setting events in motion that would allow the Siege of Asgard to occur, after he heads to Chicago seeking to have adventures like those of Thor. He stops a robbery but causes a lot of damage. He is attacked by the U-Foes (who were operating under orders of Norman Osborn and Loki). The incident destroys Soldier Field in Chicago, killing many. However, Volstagg is framed, making it seem as if his incompetence killed innocents. Volstagg and the Warriors Three are part of the defense effort when Osborn leads a villain army against Asgard.

After Loki's machinations to banish Thor come to fruition, the Warriors Three voluntarily leave Asgard to live in the mortal world, heading back to Broxton, Oklahoma to take over the local diner abandoned by Bill. Along with many other heroes and gods, they attend the wake of Hercules, who had fallen in battle. This meeting takes place in Athena's temple in Greece.

The trio are featured in their own limited series. In issue three, they encounter Fenris Wolf. This backstory shows the Warriors first teamed up as the vainglorious duo of Volstagg and Fandral, to out-do each other in tasks. Hogun was a shy intellectual who went with to serve as an impartial observer.

With Volstagg serving as a politician, Fandral and Hogun acquire a new job alongside Hildegarde, who has fought with them against many dangers. Under the leadership of All-Father Thor, they are asked to serve as Asgardian jail wardens. Fandral calls this new trio "The Ministers Three."

As tensions among the Nine Realms escalate due to the return of Cul and the shifting alliances of the Elves, Volstagg, stricken with grief and rage after he witnessed the deaths of several children in a confrontation with Surtur's fire-demons, travels to the remains of ancient Asgard where he claims the discarded hammer of the deceased Ultimate Thor. This transforms him into the "War Thor". Volstagg mounts an assault on Muspelheim, but Thor convinces him to stand down, making him realize that his actions were only provoking further conflict rather than ending it.

== In other media ==
=== Television ===
- The Warriors Three appear in The Super Hero Squad Show, with Fandral voiced by Tom Kenny, Volstagg by Ted Biaselli, and Hogun having no dialogue.
- The Warriors Three appear in The Avengers: Earth's Mightiest Heroes, with Fandral voiced by Chris Cox, Volstagg by Fred Tatasciore, and Hogun having no dialogue.
- The Warriors Three appear in the Hulk and the Agents of S.M.A.S.H. episode "For Asgard", with Fandral by Benjamin Diskin, Hogun by Clancy Brown, and Volstagg by Fred Tatasciore.
- The Warriors Three appear in the Guardians of the Galaxy episode "Asgard War Part One: Lightning Strikes".

=== Film ===
- The Warriors Three appear in Hulk Vs Thor, with Fandral voiced by Jonathan Holmes, Hogun by Paul Dobson, and Volstagg by Jay Brazeau.
- The Warriors Three appear in Thor: Tales of Asgard, with Fandral voiced by Alistair Abell, Hogun by Paul Dobson and Volstagg by Brent Chapman.

Tadanobu Asano, Joshua Dallas and Ray Stevenson as the Warriors Three; Hogun, Fandral and Volstagg in the Marvel Studios film, Thor.

- The Warriors Three appear in films set in the Marvel Cinematic Universe (MCU), with Fandral initially portrayed by Josh Dallas and later by Zachary Levi, Hogun by Tadanobu Asano, and Volstagg by Ray Stevenson. They appear in the films Thor; Thor: The Dark World; Thor: Ragnarok, in which they are killed by Hela; and Thor: Love and Thunder via archival footage.

=== Video games ===
- The Warriors Three appear in Lego Marvel Super Heroes, with Fandral voiced by Troy Baker, Hogun by Andrew Kishino, and Volstagg by Fred Tatasciore. They are available via the Asgard DLC.
- The Warriors Three appear as playable characters in Marvel: Avengers Alliance.
- The Warriors Three appear as playable characters in Marvel: Future Fight.

=== Miscellaneous ===
- The MCU incarnation of the Warriors Three appear in Thor: Crown of Fools.
- The Warriors Three appear in the Tales of Asgard trilogy, written by Keith R.A. DeCandido and published by Joe Books.

== Collected edition ==
- Thor: The Warriors Three collects Marvel Spotlight (1971) #30 and Marvel Fanfare (1982) #13, 34–37
- Warriors Three: Dog Day Afternoon collects Warriors Three #1–4, Tales to Astonish #101 and Incredible Hulk #102
