= Mangog =

Marvel Comics fictional character

- Mangog as depicted in Thor #155 (August 1968). Art by Jack Kirby and Vince Colletta.

Publication information
- Publisher: Marvel Comics
- First appearance: Thor #154 (July 1968)
- Created by: Stan Lee (writer); Jack Kirby (artist)

In-story information
- Partnerships: Thanos
- Notable aliases: Odin
- Abilities: Superhuman strength, stamina, durability and endurance Shapeshifting and energy projection via magic manipulation Immortality; Self-resurrection; Empathic ability to feed on the hatred of sentient beings Empowerment from the selfish acts of gods

Mangog is a character appearing in American comic books published by Marvel Comics.

== Publication history ==
The character first appeared in Thor #154 (July 1968) and was created by Stan Lee and Jack Kirby.

== Creation ==
The character was based on the giants Gog and Magog, who would combine their bodies to become Gogmagog.

== Fictional character biography ==
The character was described in his debut as being the sum total of the hatred of "a billion billion beings" and the sole survivor of an alien species who attempted to invade Asgard before Odin stopped them. Imprisoned beneath Asgard, Mangog is freed by the rock troll Ulik, in a failed bid to secure an ally against the gods. Mangog storms Asgard, intent on obtaining the Odinsword to destroy the universe. Thor battles Mangog to a standstill, until Odin stops him by breaking the spell which had created Mangog as a living prison for his entire race.

Mangog is later freed by Loki, but defeated after being drained of his power. With the aid of the traitorous magician Igron, Mangog assumes the form of an imprisoned Odin, and intends to once again draw the Odinsword. After a series of skirmishes with Thor, the creature is defeated when Thor frees Odin.

The character reappears twice in the second volume of Thor: as the servant of a clone of the Titan Thanos (destroyed by Thor) and in a desolated Asgard during Ragnarok (dispelled by Thor with the Odinforce) Mangog reappears in the Thunderstrike mini-series when accidentally summoned by a mystical generator, and is eventually defeated when cast into a distant star.

In The Mighty Thor, Mangog decimates Asgard until Jane Foster / Thor throws him into the sun. He later absorbs Mjolnir's power and becomes the God of Hammers before Thor fatally drains his energy.

== Powers and abilities ==
Mangog possesses the strength, stamina, durability and endurance of a "billion billion beings", and has the ability to manipulate magic for energy projection and shapeshifting.

Mangog appears to be indestructible, and has stated that he will always exist as long as there is hatred. Mangog is also called "the Judgment of the Gods", drawing strength from every cruel act performed by the gods.

== Other versions ==
=== Heroes Reborn ===
In an alternate reality depicted in the 2021 Heroes Reborn miniseries, Mangog became the All-Gog: Final All-Father, Destroyer of Asgard after devouring most of the Asgardians. Following this, he went on to destroy Asgard and join the Masters of Doom. While fighting Power Princess in the present, however, she uses one of her gauntlets to badly injure Mangog before petrifying him.

=== Ultimate Marvel ===
An alternate universe version of Mangog from Earth-1610 appears in Ultimate Spider-Man #150. This version is a spirit who requires a host to survive and was previously imprisoned in the Eye of Avalon.

=== Ultimate Universe ===
An alternate universe version of Mangog appears in The Ultimates #23, where he is killed in battle with Sif.

=== What If? ===
In an issue of What If that asks "What If Jane Foster Found Thor's Hammer", Mangog attempts to take advantage of Odin's need for the Odinsleep but is stopped by Jane Foster, who has found Thor's hammer Mjolnir.

== In other media ==
=== Television ===
Mangog appears in the Avengers Assemble episode "All-Father's Day", voiced by JB Blanc.

=== Video games ===
- Mangog appears in Thor: God of Thunder, voiced simultaneously by Steve Blum, Robin Atkin Downes, Mitch Lewis, Lisa Moncure, and Mari Weiss. This version was created by Odin and bound in Scabrite chains to limit his destructiveness.
- Mangog appears in Thor: The Dark World - The Official Game, voiced by Chris Phillips and Marc Thompson.

=== Miscellaneous ===
Mangog appears in HeroClix as part of "The Mighty Thor" set.
