= Destroyer (Thor) =

Comic book character

- The Destroyer armor as featured in a panel from Thor (Vol. 3) #5. Art by Olivier Coipel.

Publication information
- Publisher: Marvel Comics
- First appearance: Journey into Mystery #118 (July 1965)
- Created by: Stan Lee (writer); Jack Kirby (artist)

In story information
- Type: Weapon
- Element of stories featuring: Asgard

The Destroyer is a fictional magical character appearing in American comic books published by Marvel Comics. Usually depicted as an opponent of the Thunder God and hero Thor, it is a suit of Asgardian armor created and animated by magic. The character first appeared in Journey into Mystery #118 (July 1965) and was created by Stan Lee and Jack Kirby.

Debuting in the Silver Age of Comic Books, the Destroyer is featured in over four decades of Marvel continuity and other Marvel-endorsed products such as animated television series, live-action films, video games, and merchandise such as action figures and trading cards.

== Fictional history ==
The Destroyer is an enchanted suit of armor forged by the King of the Norse gods, Odin. When it first appeared, it was hinted that the Destroyer had been created as a weapon to face an unspecified menace. First seen in the Temple of Darkness in Asia, the Destroyer is used by Thor's arch-foe Loki against him. Animated by a nearby life force, it battles Thor to a standstill, Loki is forced to intervene and stop the Destroyer using lethal force when Odin threatens to kill him. Thor then buries the armor under a mountain slide.

The armor is briefly used again by Loki in a failed bid to kill Odin, before being salvaged by Karnilla, queen of the Norns, and animated by Thor's companion Sif, who attempts to use it to battle the Wrecker when Thor is temporarily deprived of his godhood and powers. The Destroyer attacks Thor, with the battle ending when Sif breaks her connection with it.

Thor later offers the armor to Galactus in exchange for releasing his current herald, Firelord. Galactus accepts and the Destroyer acts as his herald, going on to battle the Fantastic Four. The Destroyer is finally recaptured for reuse by Loki.

It is later revealed that the Destroyer was created to combat the Celestials. Odin enters the Destroyer armor and then absorbs the life essences of all present in Asgard (with the exception of Thor), growing to a colossal size. However, the Celestials melt the Destroyer armor into slag, scattering the life forces of the Asgardians. The initiative of the Skymother goddesses pacifies the Celestials, and Thor revives his people via Odin by using a fraction of the gathered power of the other Skyfathers.

Loki eventually finds the remains of the Destroyer and reforms it in a bid to destroy Thor, who has been reduced to pulp after a battle with the Midgard Serpent. The Destroyer, however, cannot kill Thor due to a curse induced by Hela that made his bones brittle and incapable of healing or dying. Thor wrests control of the armor from the host—an enthralled Frost Giant named Siggorth—through sheer force of will and goes on to defeat Loki. The Destroyer - depicted as sapient and capable of speech - tries to take back control from Thor, but fails. Wearing Thor's raiment and wielding his hammer Mjolnir, the Destroyer confronts Hela and forces her to restore Thor to normal.

The Destroyer is later deployed by trolls, who empower it with the spirit of the Maestro, an evil future version of the Hulk. Unable to physically stop the Destroyer, the Hulk enters the armor on the mental plane and banishes the Maestro back to his weakened original body. Thor has two more encounters with the Destroyer, with the armor almost killing him on the first occasion and breaking his jaw on the second. The armor is eventually retrieved by Loki and occupied by the entity Desak. However, Thor decapitates it with one throw of Mjolnir, instantly killing Desak.

During the "Siege" storyline, Doctor Doom uses a copy of the Destroyer armor to attack the Asgardians.

After Thor loses the ability to wield Mjolnir following the "Original Sin" storyline, and the hammer is claimed by an unknown woman, Odin dispatches the Destroyer - animated by his brother Cul the Serpent - to reclaim it. Frigga forces Odin to withdraw the Destroyer when she confronts him with the knowledge that he has essentially become the villain with his unprovoked attack.

== Powers and abilities ==
The Destroyer is forged from an unknown and enchanted metal. The Destroyer armor possesses superhuman strength, stamina and is practically invulnerable. It is capable of energy projection, matter manipulation and when lowered the armor's visor can fire a disintegrating beam.

Although the Destroyer can act independently for brief periods, the construct is typically lifeless until animated by the life force of a sentient living being. Once animated, the Destroyer retains a rudimentary base personality that will eventually subvert the host unless they have a particularly strong will. Odin is also capable of casting a spell that can force the animating persona from the armor and deactivate it.

== Other versions ==
=== Secret Wars (2015) ===
An alternate universe version of the Destroyer from the Maestro's future appears in Secret Wars.

=== Ultimate Universe ===
An alternate universe version of the Destroyer appears in The Ultimates. Loki unleashes the Destroyer in a bid to end Thor's rebellion, only for Surtur to melt the Destroyer into a slab.

=== What If... Loki Was Worthy? (Earth-TRN1364) ===
An alternate universe version of the Destroyer appears in the novel What If... Loki Was Worthy? (written by Madeleine Roux), which is set in a timeline where Loki is stripped of his powers and banished to Earth after his latest mischief (which involved sabotaging the Destroyer with help from the dwarf Kvisa Röksdóttir) results in the death of Thor and several casualties in New York City. The Destroyer is found and discovered by Tony Stark, who (driven to revenge on Asgard after his best friend Happy Hogan dies in the fight between Thor and the Destroyer) rebuilds the remains of the Destroyer armor into the Iron Destroyer.

== In other media ==
=== Television ===
- The Destroyer appears in the "Mighty Thor" segment of The Marvel Super Heroes.
- The Destroyer appears in The Avengers: Earth's Mightiest Heroes episode "Powerless".
- The Destroyer appears in the Ultimate Spider-Man episode "Itsy Bitsy Spider-Man".
- The Destroyer appears in Avengers Assemble.
- The Destroyer appears in Guardians of the Galaxy.
- The Destroyer appears in Marvel Disk Wars: The Avengers.

=== Film ===
The Destroyer appears in Thor.

=== Video games ===
- The Destroyer appears as a boss in Marvel: Ultimate Alliance.
- The Destroyer armor is an unlockable costume for Thor in Thor: God of Thunder.
- The Destroyer appears as a boss and unlockable character in Marvel: Avengers Alliance.
- The Destroyer appears as a boss and unlockable character in Lego Marvel Super Heroes.
- The Destroyer appears as a playable character in Marvel: Future Fight.
- The Destroyer appears as a playable character in Lego Avengers.
- The Destroyer appears as a boss in Marvel Ultimate Alliance 3: The Black Order, voiced by Liam O'Brien. Hela places Red Skull's soul into the Destroyer armor to fight the heroes and Loki, only for it to be impaled by Odin.
- The Destroyer appears in Marvel Snap.

=== Merchandise ===
- The Destroyer was included as a chase variant in the 15th wave of Toy Biz's Marvel Legends action figure line.
- A figure of the Destroyer was released in wave 39 of the Marvel Minimates line.
- A figure of the Destroyer was released in the Battle for Asgard's Vault 3-pack from the Marvel Super Hero Squad line, packaged with Thor and Loki.
- Two figures of the Destroyer were released in Hasbro's Thor: The Mighty Avenger line. Due to trademark issues, at least one figure is marketed as Marvel's Destroyer.
- A figure of the Destroyer was released as part of HeroClix.
- Funko released a bobblehead for the Destroyer based on its appearance in the Thor film, which was only available in certain Bethany Beach, Delaware stores.
