= Odin (Marvel Comics) =

Marvel Comics character

- Odin as appeared on the cover of Journey Into Mystery #122 (November 1962). Art by Jack Kirby.

Publication information
- Publisher: Marvel Comics
- First appearance: Journey into Mystery #86 (November 1962)
- Created by: Stan Lee (writer); Jack Kirby (artist)

In-story information
- Full name: Odin Borson
- Species: Asgardian
- Team affiliations: Asgard; Council of Godheads; Avengers (1,000,000 BC)
- Notable aliases: The All-Father; Gagnraðr; Grímnir; Atum-Re; The Wanderer; Orrin; Infinity
- Abilities: Superhuman strength, stamina, durability, speed, agility, reflexes, healing, longevity, and wisdom; Odin Force grants: Magic manipulation; Weather modification; Electrokinesis; Life-force manipulation; Molecular manipulation; Inter-dimensional teleportation

Odin Borson, the All-Father is a character appearing in American comic books published by Marvel Comics. First mentioned in Journey into Mystery #85 (Oct. 1962), the character first appears in Journey into Mystery #86 (Nov. 1962), and was adapted from the Odin of Norse mythology by Stan Lee and Jack Kirby. The character is depicted as the father of Thor and, traditionally, as the king of Asgard.

Sir Anthony Hopkins portrayed the character in the Marvel Cinematic Universe (MCU) films Thor (2011), Thor: The Dark World (2013), and Thor: Ragnarok (2017).

== Publication history ==
Odin featured on the cover of Thor #294 (April 1980). Art by Keith Pollard.

Although Odin was first mentioned in Journey into Mystery #85 (Oct. 1962), his first actual appearance was in Journey into Mystery #86 (November 1962). He was created for Marvel Comics by Stan Lee and Jack Kirby.

== Fictional character biography ==
Odin is the son of Bor (father, one of the first Asgardians) and Bestla (mother, a frost giantess), and the full brother of Vili and Ve. With the aid of his brothers, a young Odin defeats the fire demon Surtur; later, Odin reveals that his brothers were killed by Surtur, but gave their power to Odin. Later Surtur was imprisoned inside the Earth. Odin thereafter became ruler of Asgard, where he received the epithet of All-Father, and eventually fell in love with the elder goddess, Gaea, by whom he is the father of Thor. After Thor's birth, Odin returns to Asgard, where his wife, Frigga, acts as Thor's mother. Odin is also the adoptive father of Loki, a child of Giant ancestry whose father Laufey is killed by Odin in battle: adopted in a deal with Bor's spirit, unaware of Bor's intention that the child would bring about Odin's downfall. Despite Odin's intentions, Thor and Loki become bitter enemies. Odin also was the father of Balder from Frigga.

Thor's preoccupation with Midgard (Earth) is a constant annoyance to Odin who, as punishment, has deprived Thor of his powers on at least three occasions. Each time, Thor's willingness to atone for his transgressions, his continued noble intentions, and his bravery, eventually convince Odin to restore his original powers and identity.

As ruler and protector of the Asgardian people, Odin has been involved in a number of crises that have threatened Asgard and, on occasion, Earth. Notable examples included stopping Loki, the Storm Giant Skagg, and Surtur (with the aid of Thor and Balder); defeating Absorbing Man after he absorbs almost all of Asgard; banishing the monster Mangog; sacrificing his right eye to Mimir for the wisdom to stop Ragnarök (Twilight of the Gods); attempting to stop the Celestials in the armor of the Destroyer; engaging inter-dimensional tyrant Dormammu in a "cosmic chess" match as champions of Master Order and Lord Chaos respectively, and preventing Surtur from lighting the Sword of Doom, Twilight.

Odin has also died three times in defense of Asgard. On the first occasion, Odin is killed by Mangog, and later revived by Hela. On the second occasion, the Celestials melt the Destroyer, and thus stifle all Asgardians except Thor, who collects a portion of energy from each pantheon and uses it to revive Odin, who in turn resurrects the Asgardians.

The final occasion involves a massive battle against Surtur on Earth, with Odin apparently dying once and for all, when the Odin Force—the source of Odin's power—migrates to his son, Thor. As Thor eventually destroys the Loom of Fates and stops Asgard from perpetuating Ragnarok—which ends the entire Norse pantheon and Asgard itself—Thor believes Odin may be dead permanently. The Odin Force appears to him in humanoid form and says that this was Odin's plan all along.

When Thor returns from hibernation in the void, he begins to find the lost Asgardians, but does not search for his father. During his Odinsleep, Thor finds Odin in a limbo wherein every day he does battle with Surtur. Odin declines Thor's offer of taking his place—noting that just Thor's offer has broken Bor's curse that he would be abandoned as Bor was—and states that Thor must lead the Asgardians, while Odin continues in a state approximating the Asgardian equivalent of heaven, to prevent Surtur from reentering the world. Loki assuages Doctor Doom's fears about Odin's potential wrath if the Asgardians move to Latveria, assuring him that "Old One-Eye is yesterday's god" and "a relic". Later, Odin's absence from the Nine Worlds leads his revived father Bor to wage battle against Thor after Loki and Hela revive him. When Bor is killed, Loki and Balder have Thor exiled for regicide.

During the "Siege" storyline, Norman Osborn sends the Thunderbolts to steal Odin's spear Gungnir from the Asgardian weaponry. Loki calls on Odin to return the Norn Stones to him so he can empower the heroes to defeat the Void.

Odin returns from the dead after Asgard is invaded by the World-Eaters.

During the "Fear Itself" storyline, Odin senses the return of his elder brother, the fear god Cul. After a brief monologue with Uatu the Watcher, Odin commands his people to return to the Asgardian plane against the protests of Thor, and Asgard rebuilds into a war engine with which he intends to raze Earth completely, to destroy the Serpent. Thor convinces Odin to send him back to Earth instead, and Iron Man travels to Asgard-space for an audience with Odin, wherein Iron Man asks Odin if he can use one of Asgard's workshops to make weapons, and Odin allows him to use the Workshops of Svartalfheim, to stop the Serpent before his shadow falls on the World Tree. Captain America and the Avengers bring an unconscious Thor to Broxton so that Odin can heal Thor. As he tends to his son, Odin confesses that he has always tried to prevent Thor's prophesied death by the Serpent, not to prevent Ragnarok, but because he loves his son and does not want to see him perish. Odin prepares Thor by giving him the armor and helmet that he himself wore the last time he cast out the Serpent and gives Thor the Odinsword, named Ragnarok (which was forged to end all things). While Thor kills the Serpent at the cost of his own life, Odin frees those affected by the Hammers of the Worthy, and returns to Asgard with the corpse of the Serpent sealing off Asgard from Hermod and a number of other Asgardians left on Earth.

In the "Original Sin" storyline, it is revealed to Thor that Angela is the daughter of Odin and Frigga; "killed" as an infant during Asgard's war with the Angels of the Tenth Realm, whereupon Odin severed the tenth realm from the other nine as "punishment". Odin was later freed from his self-exile by Loki as he is set to return to Asgard. The fight between Thor and Angela is interrupted when Odin recognizes Angela as his daughter and reveals Angela's true history, wherein an Angel raised her as one of the Angels under the name of Angela. Due to her services for the Angels, the Queen pardoned Angela her life, but exiled her from Heaven for her lineage. After leaving Heaven, Odin tells Thor, Loki, and Angela that he still loves his children.

Angered that someone else is wielding Mjolnir, Odin sends the Destroyer after the new female Thor, appointing Cul Borson as his new 'Minister of Justice' to enforce his new decrees and operate the Destroyer, but Odinson and Freyja assemble an army of female superheroes to aid her, forcing Odin to stand down.

In Secret Wars, Odin dreams of the end of all existence in an event greater than Ragnarok. He additionally battles King Loki, an evil alternate timeline version of Loki who threatens to destroy Asgard.

In All-New, All-Different Marvel, Odin has become a tyrant ruling Asgard with an iron fist following Thor's disappearance. He makes use of the Thunder Guard and the Destroyer armor to protect his kingdom, imprisoning Frigga and anyone who gets in his way. His reason for imprisoning Frigga is because she assisted the female Thor against the Destroyer.

In Generations, Odin reminisces with the Phoenix Force about their previous love affair. He is revealed to have been part of a past incarnation of the Avengers in 1,000,000 BC alongside Agamotto, Black Panther, Ghost Rider, Iron Fist, Phoenix, and Star Brand.

During the "Death of Thor" arc, Odin faces the return of Mangog and is unable to defeat it. Odin and the Asgardians are saved by the female Thor, who kills Mangog at the cost of Mjolnir. Without Mjolnir, Thor returns to her mortal form of Jane Foster and dies from her cancer. Odin and Thor channel the God Tempest to resurrect Foster.

During the "War of the Realms" storyline, Odin ponders how he can defeat Malekith the Accursed with the Bifröst destroyed and Asgard in shambles. Odin survives an attempt on his life by Malekith's assassins, who have created a version of the Bifröst that allows them to teleport to any of the nine realms. Following Malekith's death, Odin appoints Thor as his successor.

In Thor (vol. 6), Odin sacrifices himself to give Thor his power and help him defeat Mangog.

In The Mortal Thor series, Odin returns from the dead and confronted a disguised Loki about what happened to Thor. Odin learns that Donald Blake has become a separate entity from Thor and warns Loki that he will be blamed for Blake's actions. The next day, Odin learns about the activities of Sigurd Jarlson, the mortal form of Thor, and foresees three judgments for him. After Jarlson had passed the tests involving Thor's enemies and Thor's doom, Odin sends Jarlson on a journey into mystery to partake in a test that involves calling back Thor.

== Powers and abilities ==
As King of the Norse Gods, Odin possesses vast strength, stamina and durability far greater than that of a normal Asgardian, along with resistance to all Earthly diseases and toxins, incredible resistance to magic and, as a courtesy of the Golden Apples of Idunn, a greatly extended lifespan. Odin has all the abilities of his son Thor, but to a much greater degree. Odin is capable of manipulating the Odinforce—a powerful source of energy—for a number of purposes, including energy projection; creation of illusions and force fields; levitation; molecular manipulation, communicating telepathically with other Asgardians even if they are on Earth and he is in Asgard, hypnotizing humans; channelling lightning to Earth from Asgard, controlling the lifeforces of all Asgardians, and teleportation. The character has also used the Odinforce for greater feats such as transporting the entire human race to an alternate dimension; stopping time; pulling the remains of distant planets down from outer space to crush his foes, compressing the population of an entire planet into a single being, the Mangog and then recreating the race and taking a soul away from the arch-demon Mephisto. The Odinforce makes Odin capable of destroying entire galaxies, allowing him to engage entities such as Galactus on their own terms. In some stories, Odin has been portrayed at a universal or even multiversal scale of power.

Once a year, during the Asgardian winter, Odin must undertake the Odinsleep for 24 hours to regenerate (and is closely guarded as he is vulnerable during this period), although he can be weakened by potent spells, such as those of Karnilla.

Odin is also a master tactician and schemer, and has prevented Ragnarok, and planned for centuries for the coming of the Celestial Fourth Host. The character also on occasion uses the eight-legged steed Sleipnir and the enchanted ship Skipbladnir, which can navigate the "sea of space" and shrink to the size of a toy.

=== Equipment ===
In battles against opponents of similar power, Odin carries the magical spear Gungnir ("The Spear of Heaven"), an artifact made of the metal uru, that can be used to channel the Odinforce. Even without the Odinforce, it can still match Thor's hammer in battle.

== Reception ==
- In 2020, CBR.com ranked Odin 3rd in their "10 Marvel Gods With The Highest Kill Count" list.

== Other versions ==
=== Spider-Geddon ===
In Spider-Punk's universe, Odin is the source of Eric Masters' powers.

=== Ultimate Marvel ===
An alternate universe version of Odin from Earth-1610 appears in the Ultimate Marvel universe. This version is the embodiment of Asgard and the source of power for Mjolnir and the Norn Stones. Odin is later killed by the Children of Tomorrow, but returns to assist Thor as a spirit.

=== Ultimate Universe ===
An alternate universe version of Odin appears in "Ultimate Invasion", where he is killed by the Maker and Loki during their conquest of Asgard.

== In other media ==
=== Television ===
- Odin appears in The Mighty Thor segment of The Marvel Super Heroes, voiced by Len Carlson.
- Odin appears in the Robot Chicken episode "Dear Consumer", voiced by Greg Grunberg.
- Odin appears in The Super Hero Squad Show, voiced by Jess Harnell.
- Odin appears in The Avengers: Earth's Mightiest Heroes, voiced by Clancy Brown.
- Odin makes a non-speaking appearance in the Ultimate Spider-Man episode "Field Trip".
- Odin appears in Avengers Assemble, voiced by Frank Welker.
- Odin appears in the Hulk and the Agents of S.M.A.S.H. episode "Days of Future Smash: Smashgard", voiced again by Frank Welker.
- Odin appears in Guardians of the Galaxy, voiced again by Frank Welker.
- Odin appears in the Marvel Future Avengers episode "Can You Believe in Loki", voiced by Bin Sasaki in the original Japanese version and by Fred Tatasciore in the English dub.
- Odin is set to appear in Iron Man and His Awesome Friends, voiced by Alan Ruck.

=== Film ===
- Odin, based on the Ultimate Marvel incarnation, appears in Ultimate Avengers 2, voiced by Dwight Schultz.
- Odin appears in Hulk vs. Thor, voiced by French Tickner.
- Odin appears in Thor: Tales of Asgard, voiced by Christopher Britton.
- Odin, based on the MCU incarnation (see below), appears in The Good, the Bart, and the Loki, voiced by Maurice LaMarche.

=== Marvel Cinematic Universe ===
Character poster for the film Thor featuring Anthony Hopkins as Odin.

Odin appears in media set in the Marvel Cinematic Universe (MCU), portrayed by Anthony Hopkins. He first appears in the live-action film Thor before making further appearances in the live-action films Thor: The Dark World and Thor: Ragnarok. Additionally, alternate timeline variants of Odin appear in the Disney+ animated series What If...?, voiced by Jeff Bergman voice-matching Hopkins.

=== Video games ===
- Odin appears in Marvel: Ultimate Alliance, voiced by Peter Renaday. He is targeted by Doctor Doom's Masters of Evil, who plot to steal his powers. After Doom is defeated, a rejuvenated Odin sends a thunderbolt that teleports Doom away, leaving only his mask behind. Additionally, a side mission in Castle Doom involves Odin being freed from imprisonment. If Odin is freed, his intervention will prevent Thanos from enslaving Earth in the near future. If not, Thanos will conquer Earth and rule for centuries before being overthrown.
- Odin, based on the MCU incarnation, appears in Thor: God of Thunder, voiced by Tom Kane.
- Odin appears as a DLC character in Lego Marvel Super Heroes, voiced by John DiMaggio.
- Odin appears as a playable character in Lego Marvel's Avengers, voiced again by Frank Welker.
- Odin appears as a non-playable character in Marvel Avengers Alliance.
- The MCU incarnation of Odin appears in the Thor: The Dark World tie-in game, voiced by Scottie Ray.
- Odin appears as a playable character in Marvel Future Fight.
- Odin appears as a playable character in Marvel Puzzle Quest.
- Odin appears as an unlockable character in Marvel Avengers Academy, voiced again by Fred Tatasciore.
- Odin appears as a non-playable character (NPC) in Marvel Ultimate Alliance 3: The Black Order, voiced again by Dwight Schultz.
- Odin appears in Marvel Snap.

=== Miscellaneous ===
Odin appears in Thor & Loki: Blood Brothers, voiced by Joe Teiger.
