= List of Thor titles =

Thor is a comic book superhero in the Marvel Universe. Since 1962, he and the Jane Foster incarnation of Thor have starred in several ongoing series, as well as many limited series and specials. All stories are published exclusively by Marvel Comics under their standard imprint, unless otherwise noted.

== Primary series ==
- Journey into Mystery #83–125 (August 1962 – February 1966)
  - Journey into Mystery Annual #1 (1965)
- Thor #126–406 (March 1966 – August 1989)
  - Thor King-Size Special #2–4 (1966–1971)
  - Thor Annual #5–19 (1976–1979; 1981–1985; 1989–1994)
- The Mighty Thor #407–490 (September 1989 – September 1995)
- Thor #491–502 (October 1995 – September 1996)
- Thor vol. 2 #1–85 [#503–587] (July 1998 – December 2004)
  - Silver Surfer & Thor Annual '98
  - Thor Annual vol. 2 1999, 2000, 2001
- Thor vol. 3 #1–12 [#588–599] (July 2007 – December 2008)
  - Thor Annual vol. 3 #1 (2009)
- Thor vol. 1 #600–621 (February 2009 – March 2011) and Thor vol. 1 #620.1 (March 2011)
- The Mighty Thor vol. 2 #1–22 [#622–643] (April 2011 – October 2012) and The Mighty Thor vol. 1 #12.1 (April 2012)
  - The Mighty Thor Annual #1 (2012)
- Thor: God of Thunder #1–25 [#644–668] (November 2012 – September 2014)
- Thor vol. 4 #1–8 [#669–676] (October 2014 – May 2015, featuring Jane Foster)
  - Thor Annual vol. 4 #1 (2015, featuring Jane Foster)
- The Mighty Thor vol. 3 #1–23 [#677–699] (November 2015 – September 2017, featuring Jane Foster)
- The Mighty Thor #700–706 (October 2017 – May 2018, featuring Jane Foster)
- Thor vol. 5 #1–16 [#707–722] (June 2018 – August 2019)
- King Thor #1–4 [#723–726] (September 2019 – December 2019)
- Thor vol. 6 #1–35 [#727–761] (January 2020 – June 2023)
  - Thor Annual vol. 5 #1 (2021)
  - Thor Annual vol. 6 #1 (2023)
- The Immortal Thor #1–Present [#762–Present] (August 2023 – Present)
  - The Immortal Thor Annual #1 (2024)

== Secondary series ==
(issue numbers do not count towards the legacy numbering)

- Journey into Mystery vol. 2 #1–19 (October 1972 – October 1975, contains horror stories; does not feature Thor)
- Journey into Mystery vol. 1 #503–521 (November 1996 – June 1998, features The Lost Gods story arc, Shang-Chi, Black Widow, Hannibal King; does not feature Thor)
  - Journey into Mystery vol. 1 #−1 (July 1997)
- Journey into Mystery vol. 1 #622–655 (April 2011 – August 2013) and Journey into Mystery vol. 1 #626.1 (August 2011)

== Miniseries and one-shots ==
- Thor: The Legend #1 (September 1996)
- Marvel Comics Group: Thor #1 (July 2000)
- Thor: Godstorm #1–3 (September – November 2001)
- Thor: Vikings #1–5 (July – November 2003)
- Thor: Son of Asgard #1–12 (March 2004 – January 2005)
- Thor: Blood Oath #1–6 (September – December 2005)
- What If? Thor #1 (February 2006)
- Thor: Ages of Thunder (April 2008)
- Thor: Reign of Blood (June 2008)
- Secret Invasion: Thor #1–3 (August – October 2008)
- Thor: The Truth of History #1 (October 2008)
- Thor God-Size Special (December 2008)
- Thor: Man of War (January 2009)
- Thor: The Trial of Thor #1 (June 2009)
- Thor Giant-Size Finale #1 (November 2009)
- Thor and the Warriors Four #1–4 (April – July 2010)
- Thor: The Mighty Avenger #1–8 (July 2010 – January 2011)
- Thor: The Rage of Thor #1 (August 2010)
- Thor: First Thunder #1–5 (September 2010 – January 2011)
- Thor: For Asgard #1–6 (September 2010 – February 2011)
- Thor: Wolves of the North #1 (December 2010)
- Captain America/Thor: The Mighty Fighting Avengers (Free Comic Book Day 2011)
- Iron Man/Thor #1–4 (January – April 2011)
- Chaos War: Thor #1–2 (January – February 2011)
- Astonishing Thor #1–5 (November 2010 – July 2011)
- Thor: Heaven and Earth #1–4 (September – November 2011)
- Avengers Origins: Thor #1 (January 2012)
- Fear Itself: Thor #7.2 (January 2012)
- Thor: The Deviants Saga #1–5 (January – May 2012)
- Thor: Season One (December 2013)
- Thor: Crown Of Fools #1 (December 2013)
- Original Sin: Thor & Loki – The Tenth Realm #5.1–5.5 (September – November 2014)
- Thors: Battleworld #1–4 (June – October 2015)
- The Unworthy Thor #1–5 (November 2016 – March 2017)
- Generations: The Mighty Thor & The Unworthy Thor #1 (August 2017)
- Thor: Where Walk the Frost Giants #1 (October 2017)
- Thor vs. Hulk: Champions of the Universe #1–6 (November 2017 – January 2018)
- Mighty Thor: At the Gates of Valhalla #1 (July 2018)
- The War of the Realms #1–6 (June 2019 – August 2019)
- War of the Realms Omega #1 (July 2019)
- Thor: The Worthy (December 2019)
- Marvel's Avengers: Thor #1 (March 2020)
- Fortnite X Marvel: Nexus War – Thor #1 (October 2020)
- Thor: Lightning and Lament #1 (June 2022)
- Roxxon Presents: Thor #1 (June 2024)

== Spin-off miniseries and one-shots ==
- Balder the Brave #1–4 (November 1985 – May 1986)
- Thor Corps #1–4 (July – November 1993)
- Thunderstrike #1–24 (April 1993 – July 1995)
- Loki #1–4 (September – November 2004)
- Stormbreaker: The Saga of Beta Ray Bill #1–6 (March 2005 – August 2005)
- Secret Invasion Aftermath: Beta Ray Bill (June 2009)
- Beta Ray Bill: Godhunter #1–3 (August 2009 – October 2009)
- Siege: Loki (June 2010)
- Sif (June 2010)
- Ultimate Comics: Thor #1–4 (October 2010 – April 2011)
- Loki vol. 2 #1–4 (December 2010 – May 2011)
- Thunderstrike vol. 2 #1–5 (January – May 2011)
- Warriors Three #1–4 (January – April 2011)
- Loki: Agent of Asgard #1–17 (April 2014 – October 2015)
- Angela: Asgard's Assassin #1–6 (February 2015 – July 2015)
- 1602: Witch Hunter Angela #1–4 (August 2015 – December 2015)
- Angela: Queen of Hel #1–7 (December 2015 – June 2016)
- Vote Loki #1–4 (August 2016 – November 2016)
- Asgardians of the Galaxy #1–10 (November 2018 – August 2019)
- Loki vol. 3 #1–5 (September 2019 – January 2020)
- Valkyrie: Jane Foster #1–10 (October 2019 – August 2020)
- Annihilation: Scourge – Beta Ray Bill (February 2020)
- King in Black: Return of the Valkyries #1–4 (March 2021 – May 2021)
- Mighty Valkyries #1–5 (June 2021 – November 2021)
- Thor & Loki: Double Trouble #1–4 (May 2021 – September 2021)
- Beta Ray Bill #1–5 (May 2021 – September 2021)
- Jane Foster & the Mighty Thor #1–5 (August 2022 – December 2022)
- Loki vol. 4 #1–4 (August 2023 – November 2023)

== Collected editions ==
=== Marvel Masterworks: Thor ===
Volume	Material collected	Published date	ISBN
1	Journey into Mystery #83–100	1991	978-0-7851-4568-4
2	Journey into Mystery #101–110	1993	978-0-7851-5064-0
3	Journey into Mystery #111–120, Journey into Mystery Annual #1	2001	978-0-7851-1268-6
4	Journey into Mystery #121–125; Thor #126–130	2005	978-0-7851-1880-0
5	Thor #131–140, Annual #2	2006	978-0-7851-2076-6
6	Thor #141–152	2007	978-0-7851-2690-4
7	Thor #153–162	2008	978-0-7851-2924-0
8	Thor #163–172	2009	978-0-7851-3497-8
9	Thor #173–183	2010	978-0-7851-4220-1
10	Thor #184–194	2011	978-0-7851-5046-6
11	Thor #195–205	2012	978-0-7851-5885-1
12	Thor #206–216	2012	978-0-7851-6621-4
13	Thor #217–228	2014	978-0-7851-8856-8
14	Thor #229–241	2015	978-0-7851-9188-9
15	Thor #242–254, Annual #5; Marvel Spotlight #30	2016	978-0-7851-9919-9
16	Thor #255–266, Annual #6; Marvel Preview #10	2017	978-1-302-90358-9
17	Thor #267–278; Marvel Preview #10	2018	978-1-302-90972-7
18	Thor #279–290, Annual #7–8	2019	978-1-302-91821-7
19	Thor #291–302; material from Marvel Treasury Edition #24 and 26	2020	978-1-302-92234-4
20	Thor #303–314, Annual #9	2021	978-1-302-92871-1
21	Thor #315–327, Annual #10; material from Bizarre Adventures #32	2022	978-1-302-93338-8
22	Thor #328–336, Annual #11	2023	978-1-302-94941-9
23	Thor #337–348, Annual #12	2024	978-1-302-95555-7

=== Essential Thor ===
Volume	Material collected	Published date	ISBN
1	Journey into Mystery #83–112	2001	0-7851-1866-7
2	Journey into Mystery #113–125; Thor #126–136	2005	0-7851-1591-9
3	Thor #137–166	2006	0-7851-2149-8
4	Thor #167–195	2009	0-7851-3076-4
5	Thor #196–220	2011	0-7851-5093-5
6	Thor #221–247	2012	978-0-7851-6329-9
7	Thor #248–271, Annual #5–6	2013	978-0-7851-6683-2

=== Thor Epic Collection ===
Volume	Title	Material collected	Published date	ISBN
1	The God of Thunder	Journey into Mystery #83–109	October 15, 2014	978-0-7851-8835-3
2	When Titans Clash	Journey into Mystery #110–125, Thor #126–130, Annual #1; material from Not Brand Echh #3	November 02, 2016	978-0-7851-9446-0
3	The Wrath of Odin	Thor #131–153, Annual #2	September 27, 2017	978-1-302-90379-4
4	To Wake the Mangog	Thor #154–174	February 25, 2015	978-0-7851-9173-5
5	The Fall of Asgard	Thor #175–194	September 26, 2018	978-1-302-91274-1
6	Into the Dark Nebula	Thor #195–216	March 25, 2020	978-1-302-92248-1
7	Ulik Unchained	Thor #217–241, Marvel Premiere (Vol. 1) #26	December 21, 2021	978-1-302-92949-7
8	War of the Gods	Thor #242–259, Annual #5, Marvel Spotlight (Vol. 1) #30, Marvel Treasury Edition (Vol. 1) #10	June 05, 2022	978-1-302-93364-7
9	Even an Immortal Can Die	Thor #260–280, Annual #6-7, Marvel Preview (Vol. 1) #10	April 25, 2023	978-1-302-94868-9
10	The Eternals Saga	Thor #281–302. Annual #8, material from Marvel Treasury Edition #24, 26	November 26, 2024	978-1-302-95554-0
11	A Kingdom Lost	Thor #303–319, Annual #9–10	April 16, 2014	978-0-7851-8862-9
12	Runequest	Thor #320–336, Annual #11; material from Bizarre Adventures #32	August 10, 2016	978-0-7851-9445-3
16	War of the Pantheons	Thor #383–400	October 23, 2013	978-0-7851-8788-2
17	In Mortal Flesh	Thor #401–406, The Mighty Thor #407–418, Annual #14	August 02, 2017	978-1-302-90698-6
18	The Black Galaxy	The Mighty Thor #419–436, Annual #15	August 14, 2019	978-1-302-91850-7
19	The Thor War	The Mighty Thor #437–450, Annual #16–17	December 09, 2020	978-1-302-92706-6
20	The Final Gauntlet	The Mighty Thor #451–467; Thor Corps #1–4	June 01, 2021	978-1-302-93088-2
21	Blood and Thunder	The Mighty Thor #468–475, Annual #18, Silver Surfer (Vol. 3) #86–88, Warlock Chronicles (Vol. 1) #6–8, Warlock and the Infinity Watch (Vol. 1) #23–25	November 30, 2022	978-1-302-94826-9
22	Hel on Earth	The Mighty Thor #476–490, Annual #19; material from Avengers Annual #23	July 18, 2023	978-1-302-95189-4
23	Worldengine	Thor #491–502; Captain America #449; Iron Man #326; Avengers #396; Thor: The Legend #1	June 13, 2018	978-1-302-91157-7
24	The Lost Gods	Journey into Mystery #503–513, -1; Valkyrie #1; Hercules and the Heart of Chaos #1–3	June 4, 2024	978-1-302-95650-9
25	The Dark Gods	Thor (Vol. 2) #1–13, #1: Rough Cut, Annual '99; Silver Surfer/Thor Annual '98; Peter Parker: Spider-Man #2	July 29, 2025	978-1-302-96411-5

=== Omnibus ===
Title	Material collected	Published date	ISBN
The Mighty Thor Vol. 1	Journey into Mystery #83–120, Journey into Mystery Annual #1	2011, January 2022 reprint	0-7851-4973-2 978-1-302-93246-6 variant
The Mighty Thor Vol. 2	Journey into Mystery #121–125; Thor #126–152, Annual #2; Not Brand Echh 3	2013, October 2017 reprint	0-7851-6783-8 978-1-302-90381-7
The Mighty Thor Vol. 3	Thor #153–194	October 2017	1-302-90381-0
The Mighty Thor Vol. 4	Thor #195–228 and material from Marvel Treasury Edition #3	May 2023	978-1-302-94982-2
The Mighty Thor Vol. 5	Thor #229-266, Annual #5-6, Marvel Spotlight #30, And Marvel Premiere #26.	September 10, 2025	978-1-302-53243-7
Thor by Walter Simonson	Thor #337–355, 357–369, 371–382; Balder the Brave #1–4	2011, April 2024 second reprint	0-7851-4633-4 978-1-302-95761-2
Thor: Heroes Return Vol. 1	Thor (vol. 2) #1–35; Silver Surfer/Thor Annual '98; Thor Annual 1999–2000; Peter Parker: Spider-Man #2, 11; Iron Man (vol. 2) #22; Juggernaut: The Eighth Day and material from Iron Man (vol. 2) #21	October 2017	1-302-90813-8
Thor: Heroes Return Vol. 2	Thor (vol. 2) #36–85; Thor Annual 2001; Iron Man (vol. 2) #64; Avengers (vol. 2) #63 and material from Marvel Double-Shot #1	October 2018	1-302-91361-1
Thor by J. Michael Straczynski	Fantastic Four #536–537; Thor (vol. 3) #1–12; Thor #600–603; Thor Giant-Size Finale	December 2010	0-7851-4029-8
Thor by Straczynski & Gillen	Fantastic Four #536–537; Thor (vol. 3) #1–12; Thor #600–614; Annual #1; Thor Giant-Size Finale; Siege #1-4 and #1 Director's Cut; Siege: Loki; New Mutants (vol. 3) #11, Secret Invasion Aftermath: Beta Ray Bill - the Green of Eden; Beta Ray Bill: Godhunter #1-3 and material from Dark Reign: The Cabal One-Shot	January 2024	978-1-302-95301-0
Thor by Matt Fraction	Thor: Ages of Thunder #1; Thor: Reign of Blood #1; Thor: Man of War #1; Secret Invasion: Thor #1–3; Thor God-Size Special #1; Free Comic Book Day 2010 (Iron Man/Thor) #1; Thor #615–621, 620.1; The Mighty Thor (vol. 2) #1–22, 12.1, Annual #1; Fear Itself #1–7; 7.2; Journey Into Mystery #642–644	June 2022	978-1-302-93480-4
Thor by Jason Aaron Vol. 1	Thor: God of Thunder #1–25, Thor (vol. 4) #1–8, Annual #1, Thors #1–4, Mighty Thor (vol. 3) #1–12	April 2022	978-1-302-93485-9
Thor by Jason Aaron Vol. 2	Mighty Thor (vol. 3) #13–23, The Mighty Thor #700–706, Unworthy Thor #1–5, Generations: The Unworthy Thor & The Mighty Thor, Mighty Thor: At the Gates of Valhalla, Thor (vol. 5) #1–16, War of the Realms #1–6, King Thor #1–4	October 2023	978-1-302-95385-0
Thor by Cates & Klein	Thor (vol. 6) #1–35, Hulk vs.Thor: Banner of War #1, Hulk (vol. 5) #7–8, Thanos: Death Notes and material from Thor (vol. 5) Annual #1 and Thor (vol. 6) Annual #1	September 2024	978-1-302-95854-1

=== Thor Volume 1 ===
Title	Material collected	Published date	ISBN
Thor of the Realms	Thor (vol. 1) #157, 159, 233–234, 347-349; Thor (vol. 3) #12; Thor: The Trial of Thor; Mighty Thor (vol. 2) #12; Original Sin #5.1; and material from Journey into Mystery (1952) #97 and Thor (vol. 1) #400	2019	978-1-302-91838-5
If Asgard Should Perish	Thor #242–253	2010	978-0-7851-4977-4
The Quest for Odin	Thor #255–266	2010	978-0-7851-4981-1
Thor: Gods, Gladiators & the Guardians of the Galaxy	Thor #267–271, Annual #5–6	2013	978-0-7851-8435-5
Thor: Ragnarok	Thor #272–278	2011	978-0-7851-4978-1
Thor: The Eternals Saga Vol. 1	Thor #283–291, Annual #7	2006	978-0-7851-2404-7
Thor: The Eternals Saga Vol. 2	Thor #292–301	2007	978-0-7851-2405-4
Thor and the Eternals: The Celestials Saga	Thor #283-301, Annual #7	2021	978-1-302-92249-8
The Mighty Thor: The Ballad of Beta Ray Bill	Thor #337–340	1989	0-87135-614-7
Thor by Walt Simonson Vol. 1	Thor #337–345	2013	978-0-7851-8460-7
Thor by Walt Simonson Vol. 2	Thor #346–355	2013	978-0-7851-8461-4
Thor by Walt Simonson Vol. 3	Thor #357–363; Balder the Brave #1–4	2013	978-0-7851-8462-1
Thor by Walt Simonson Vol. 4	Thor #364–369, 371–374	2014	978-1-302-91131-7
Thor by Walt Simonson Vol. 5	Thor #375–382	2014	978-0-7851-8464-5
Thor Visionaries: Walt Simonson Vol. 1	Thor #337–348	2009	978-0-7851-3189-2
Thor Visionaries: Walt Simonson Vol. 2	Thor #349–355, 357–359	2009	978-0-7851-3190-8
Thor Visionaries: Walt Simonson Vol. 3	Thor #360–369	2009	978-0-7851-3191-5
Thor Visionaries: Walt Simonson Vol. 4	Thor #371–374; Balder the Brave #1–4	2007	978-1-302-91131-7
Thor Visionaries: Walt Simonson Vol. 5	Thor #375–382	2008	978-0-7851-2737-6
Thor: Alone Against the Celestials	Thor #387–389	1992	978-0-7851-4635-3
Thor vs. Seth the Serpent-God	Thor #395–400	2011	978-0-7851-4635-3
Thor: The Black Galaxy Saga	The Mighty Thor #416–425	2011	978-0-7851-5095-4
Thor: Thunderstrike	The Mighty Thor #431–433, 457–459, and material from #408; Thunderstrike #1	2011	978-0-7851-5638-3
Thor: Blood and Thunder	The Mighty Thor #468–471; Silver Surfer #86–88; Warlock Chronicles #6–8; Warlock and the Infinity Watch #23–25	2011	978-0-7851-5094-7
Thor Visionaries: Mike Deodato, Jr.	Thor #491–494, 498–500	2004	978-0-7851-1408-6
Thor: Sunlight & Shadows	Thor #495, 497–502	2013	978-0-7851-6267-4
Avengers/Iron Man: First Sign	Thor #496; Captain America #449; Iron Man #326–331; Avengers #396–400	2013	978-0-7851-8496-6

=== Thor Volume 2 – Heroes Reborn ===
Thor by Dan Jurgens and John Romita Vol. 1	Thor (vol. 2) #1–8; Peter Parker: Spider-Man #2	2010	978-0-7851-3749-8
Thor by Dan Jurgens and John Romita Vol. 2	Thor (vol. 2) #9–13; Thor Annual 1999	2010	978-0-7851-4632-2
Thor by Dan Jurgens and John Romita Vol. 3	Thor (vol. 2) #14–17; Iron Man (vol. 2) #21–22; Peter Parker: Spider-Man #11; Juggernaut: The Eighth Day	2010	978-0-7851-4385-7
Thor by Dan Jurgens and John Romita Vol. 4 (republished as Thor vs. Thanos)	Thor (vol. 2) #18–25, Annual 2000	2010 (2013)	978-0-7851-4927-9 (978-0-7851-8465-2)
Thor: Across All Worlds	Thor (vol. 2) #26–35	2010	978-0-7851-4975-0
Thor: The Death of Odin	Thor (vol. 2) #36–43, Annual 2001	2002	978-0-7851-0925-9
Thor: Lord of Asgard	Thor (vol. 2) #44–50	2003	978-0-7851-1020-0
Thor: Gods on Earth	Thor (vol. 2) #51–58; Iron Man (vol. 2) #64; Avengers (vol. 2) #63; Marvel Double-Shot #1	2003	978-0-7851-1126-9
Thor: Spiral	Thor (vol. 2) #59–67	2003	978-0-7851-1127-6
Thor: The Reigning	Thor (vol. 2) #68–74	2004	978-0-7851-1247-1
Thor: Gods and Men	Thor (vol. 2) #68–79	2004	978-0-7851-1528-1
Thor: Disassembled	Thor (vol. 2) #80–85	2004	978-0-7851-1599-1

=== Thor Volume 3 and The Mighty Thor Volume 2 by Straczynski, Gillen and Fraction ===
Thor by J. Michael Straczynski Vol. 1	Thor (vol. 3) #1–6	2008	978-0-7851-1722-3
Thor by J. Michael Straczynski Vol. 2	Thor (vol. 3) #7–12; Thor #600	2009	978-0-7851-1760-5
Thor by J. Michael Straczynski Vol. 3	Thor #601–603; Thor: Giant-Size Finale #1	2010	978-0-7851-2950-9
Thor by Kieron Gillen: The Complete Collection	Thor #604–614; Siege: Loki; New Mutants (2009) #11	2011	978-0-7851-5922-3
Thor: Latverian Prometheus	Thor #604–606; Sif #1	2010	978-0-7851-4372-7
Thor: Siege	Thor #607–610; New Mutants #11; Siege: Loki	2010	978-0-7851-4814-2
Thor: Siege Aftermath	Thor #611–614	2010	978-0-7851-4638-4
Thor: The World Eaters	Thor #615–621	2011	978-0-7851-4838-8
The Mighty Thor Vol.1	The Mighty Thor (vol. 2) #1–6	2011	978-0-7851-5624-6
The Mighty Thor Vol.2	The Mighty Thor (vol. 2) #7–12, Fear Itself: Thor #7.2	2012	978-0-7851-6243-8
The Mighty Thor Vol. 3	The Mighty Thor (vol. 2) #12.1, 13-17	2012	978-0-7851-6166-0
The Mighty Thor/Journey into Mystery: Everything Burns	The Mighty Thor (vol. 2) #18–22 and Journey into Mystery #642–645	2013	978-0-7851-6168-4

=== Thor: God of Thunder by Jason Aaron ===
Thor: God of Thunder Vol. 1: The God Butcher	Thor: God of Thunder #1–5	June 2013	978-0-7851-6842-3
Thor: God of Thunder Vol. 2: Godbomb	Thor: God of Thunder #6–11	October 2013	978-0-7851-6843-0
Thor: God of Thunder Vol. 3: The Accursed	Thor: God of Thunder #12–18	March 2014	978-0-7851-8555-0
Thor: God of Thunder Vol. 4: The Last Days of Midgard	Thor: God of Thunder #19–25	October 2014	978-0-7851-5488-4
Thor: God of Thunder: Volume 1 hardcover	Thor: God of Thunder #1–11	November 2014	978-0-7851-9113-1
Thor: God of Thunder: Volume 2 hardcover	Thor: God of Thunder #12–25	July 2015	978-0-7851-9800-0

=== Thor Volume 4 and The Mighty Thor Volume 3 by Jason Aaron ===
Original Sin: Thor & Loki – The Tenth Realm	Original Sin: Thor & Loki – The Tenth Realm #5.1–5.5	November 2014	978-0-7851-9169-8
Thor Vol. 1: Goddess of Thunder	Thor (vol. 4) #1–5	May 2015	978-0-7851-9238-1
Thor Vol. 2: Who Holds the Hammer?	Thor (vol. 4) #6–8, Annual #1	July 2015	978-0-7851-9784-3
Thors	Thors #1–4, Thor #364–365	March 2016	978-0-7851-9889-5
The Mighty Thor Vol. 1: Thunder in Her Veins	The Mighty Thor (vol. 3) #1–5	June 2016	978-0-7851-9522-1
The Mighty Thor Vol. 2: Lords of Midgard	The Mighty Thor (vol. 3) #6–12	November 2016	978-0-7851-9523-8
The Unworthy Thor	The Unworthy Thor #1–5	June 6, 2017	978-1-302-90667-2
The Mighty Thor Vol. 3: The Asgard/Shi'ar War	The Mighty Thor (vol. 3) #13–19	August 2017	978-1-302-90308-4
The Mighty Thor Vol. 4: The War Thor	The Mighty Thor (vol. 3) #20–23; Generations: The Unworthy Thor & the Mighty Thor #1	January 2018	978-1-302-90658-0
The Mighty Thor Vol. 5: The Death of the Mighty Thor	The Mighty Thor #700–706; Mighty Thor: At the Gates of Valhalla #1	June 2018	978-1-302-90660-3

=== Thor Volume 5 by Jason Aaron ===
Thor Vol. 1: God Of Thunder Reborn	Thor (vol. 5) #1–6	December 2018	978-1-84653-947-3
Thor Vol. 2: Road To War Of The Realms	Thor (vol. 5) #7–11	July 2019	978-1-302-91290-1
Thor Vol. 3: War's End	Thor (vol. 5) #12–16	November 2019	978-1-302-91445-5

=== Thor by Jason Aaron: The Complete Collection ===
Thor by Jason Aaron: The Complete Collection Vol. 1	Thor: God of Thunder #1–18	May 21, 2020	978-1-302-91810-1
Thor by Jason Aaron: The Complete Collection Vol. 2	Thor: God of Thunder #19–25; Thor (vol. 4) #1–8, Annual #1; Thors #1–4	February 2020	978-1-302-92386-0
Thor by Jason Aaron: The Complete Collection Vol. 3	Mighty Thor (vol. 3) #1–19	October 2020	978-1-302-92387-7
Thor by Jason Aaron: The Complete Collection Vol. 4	Unworthy Thor #1–5; Mighty Thor (vol. 3) #20–23; Generations: The Unworthy Thor & the Mighty Thor; Mighty Thor #700–706; Mighty Thor: At the Gates of Valhalla #1	June 2021	978-1-302-93938-0
Thor by Jason Aaron: The Complete Collection Vol. 5	Thor (vol. 5) #1–16; King Thor #1–4	May 2022	978-1-302-93163-6

=== Thor Volume 6 by Donny Cates ===
Thor Vol. 1: The Devourer King	Thor (vol. 6) #1–6	November 2020	978-1-302-92086-9
Thor Vol. 2: Prey	Thor (vol. 6) #7–14	June 2021	978-1-302-92087-6
Thor Vol. 3: Revelations	Thor (vol. 6) #15–18, Annual #1 (2021)	December 2021	978-1-302-92612-0
Thor Vol. 4: God Of Hammers	Thor (vol. 6) #19–24	July 2022	978-1-302-92613-7
Hulk Vs. Thor: Banner Of War	Hulk Vs. Thor: Banner Of War #1, Thor (vol. 6) #25–26, Hulk (vol. 5) #7–8	September 2022	978-1-302-94663-0
Thor Vol. 5: Legacy of Thanos	Thor (vol. 6) #27–30, Thanos Death Notes #1 (2022)	July 2023	978-1-302-93275-6
Thor Vol. 6: Blood of the Fathers	Thor (vol. 6) #31–35, Annual #1 (2023)	September 2023	978-1-302-94760-6

=== The Immortal Thor by Al Ewing ===
The Immortal Thor Vol. 1: All Weather Turns to Storm	The Immortal Thor (vol. 1) #1–5, Annual #1 (2023)	March 2024	978-1-302-95418-5
