= Tyr (Marvel Comics) =

Fictional character in Marvel Comics

- Thor fighting Tyr on the cover of The Mighty Thor vol. 1, #312 (October 1981). Art by Keith Pollard.

Publication information
- Publisher: Marvel Comics
- First appearance: Journey into Mystery #85 (Oct 1962)
- Created by: Stan Lee (Writer); Larry Lieber; Jack Kirby (Artist)

In-story information
- Species: Asgardian
- Place of origin: Asgard
- Abilities: Superhuman strength, endurance, and longevity; Ability to summon the Soul of the God of War

Tyr is a character in American comic books published by Marvel Comics. Created by Stan Lee, Larry Lieber and Jack Kirby, the character first appeared in Journey into Mystery #85 (October 1962). Tyr is Thor's brother and the eldest son of Odin. As the Asgardian god of war, he is known for his courage, strategic skill, and fierce temperament. Although he has at times rebelled against Odin, Tyr remains loyal to Asgard in moments of crisis and has fought alongside Thor when the realm required defending.

The character made his live-action debut in the Marvel Cinematic Universe film Thor: The Dark World (2013), portrayed by Clive Russell.

== Publication history ==
Tyr debuted in Journey into Mystery #85 (October 1962), and was created by Stan Lee, Larry Lieber and Jack Kirby. He subsequently appeared in several Marvel series, including Thor (2018), The Sword of Surtur (2021), Jane Foster & the Mighty Thor (2022), and The Immortal Thor (2023).

== Fictional character biography ==
Tyr is the Asgardian god of war and son of Odin. Tyr is renowned throughout Asgard as the only god brave enough to place his hand in the mouth of the wolf-god Fenris during the latter's binding which Fenris would not allow unless a god placed his hand in his mouth; his left hand is missing as a result, having been bitten off by Fenris, and is usually covered with a metal cup.

Tyr battled with Asgardian forces against a false Ragnarök which Odin engineered to delay the real Ragnarök. Tyr later allied with Loki against Odin, and captured the goddess Idunn and her Golden Apples of Immortality, without which the gods would grow old and die. He unleashed the Midgard Serpent on Earth when it had been strengthened by the Apples, and it is used as a bridge by their army to attack Asgard. With the enemies of Asgard, he followed Odin and the other gods to Earth, where he was betrayed by Loki and defeated by Odin. Alongside Beta Ray Bill, the Avengers, the Fantastic Four, and the Asgardian forces, Tyr battled Surtur's demons on Earth. Tyr then returned to Asgard.

Tyr is part of a small group of Asgardian warriors who petition Odin for the lives of the Warriors Three and their guardsman ally. Odin, influenced by an outside force, angrily dismisses Tyr's groups and declares the Warriors and the guardsman will die for being traitors to Asgard.

During the events of Ragnarok, Tyr fought alongside Beta Ray Bill and the armies of Asgard against Surtur, the Fire Demons, trolls and giants, and was killed in battle. Tyr was resurrected when Asgard was restored near Broxton, Oklahoma.

During the Siege of Asgard, Tyr assumes command of the Asgardian forces when Balder takes leave. Tyr suffers a personal crisis when it is predicted he will fall in battle. After he sees those who have he rallies himself to return to the front lines where he is seriously wounded by the Hood. Tyr takes control of the spirits of the fallen Asgardians and they pray for someone to lead them to the afterlife. This prayer is answered in the form of Danielle Moonstar, who has regained her old role as a Valkyrie. Moonstar and Tyr fight off the creatures, but lose three Asgardians to oblivion.

Tyr later becomes the commander of Hela's underworld forces. When Angela leads a rebellion against Hela, Tyr leads Skurge and Balder to oppose her. During the fight, he admits he loves only Hela.

== Powers and abilities ==
Tyr possesses the typical attributes of an Asgardian god, including superhuman strength, stamina, and resistance to injury. Like other Asgardians, he has an extended lifespan and is immune to terrestrial diseases. The loss of his left hand has limited his ability to lift extremely heavy weights, but does not otherwise affect his durability. As the Asgardian god of war, Tyr is a highly skilled combatant. He is proficient in all forms of Asgardian weaponry and is considered one of Asgard’s most accomplished battlefield strategists. While he can heal from most injuries at an accelerated rate, he is unable to regenerate his missing hand.

== In other media ==
- Tyr appears in Thor: The Dark World, portrayed by Clive Russell. This version is the commander of the Einherjar.
- Tyr appears as an NPC in Marvel: Ultimate Alliance, voiced by Trev Broudy.
