= Adi Granov =

American illustrator

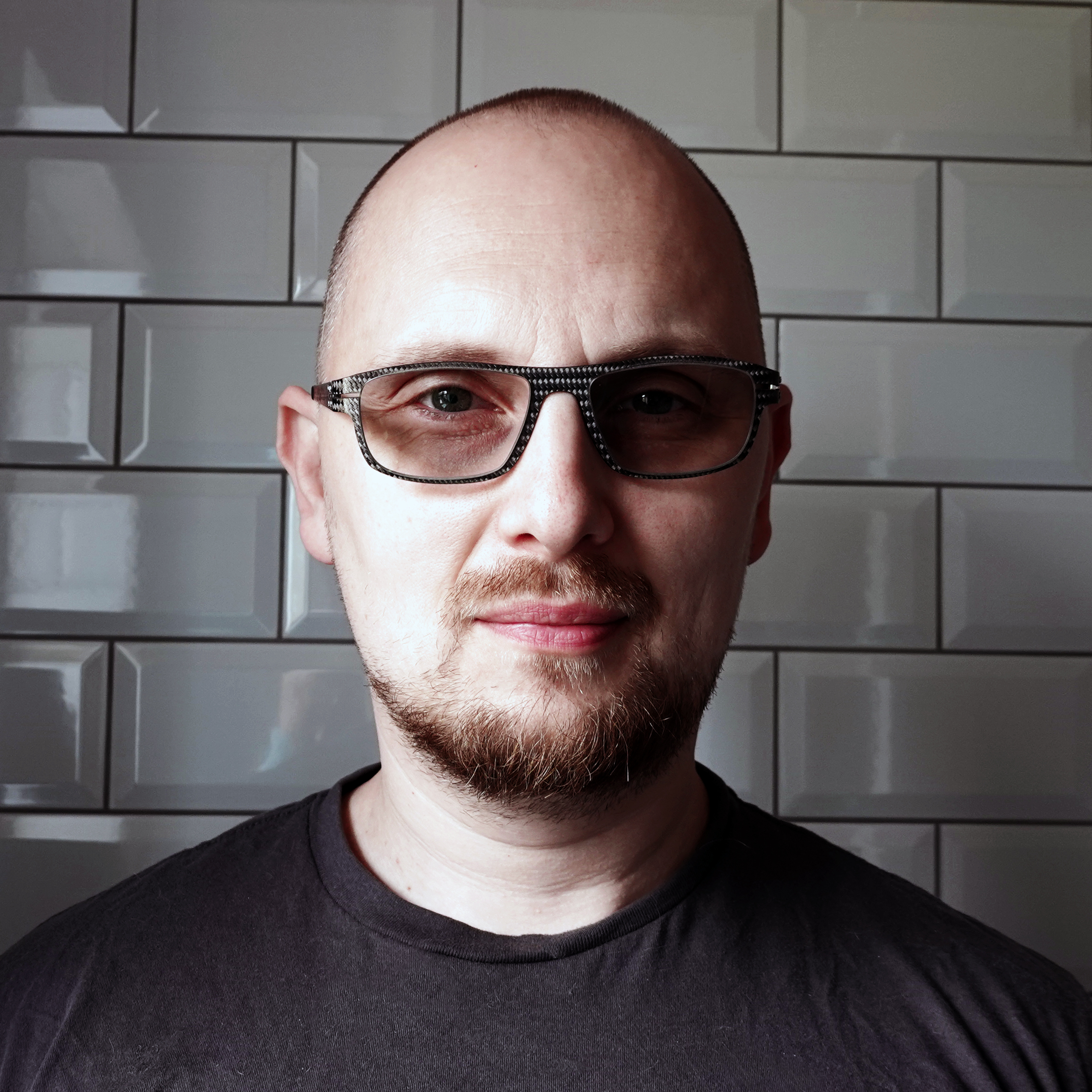
- Granov in 2019
- Born: 1977 (age 48–49) (Note: He left Sarajevo in 1994 aged 16, so based on that information, he could have been born in the range 1977–1979. He was 32 ca. 10 June 2009, yielding a birth date range of ca. 11 June 1976 – 10 June 1977. This yields a potential birth date of 1 January 1977 – ca. 10 June 1977.) Sarajevo, SR Bosnia and Herzegovina, SFR Yugoslavia
- Area: Artist

Adi Granov (/ˈɡrænəv/; born 1977) is a Bosnian-American comic book artist and conceptual designer. He is best known for his painted work with Marvel Comics, for whom most of his comics work is produced, in particular his work on Iron Man. He is especially known for illustrating the story arc Iron Man: Extremis, and for doing concept and keyframe artwork for the 2008 film Iron Man, a job for which director Jon Favreau personally selected him. Granov has also done concept work for the films The Avengers and The Amazing Spider-Man 2, has designed packaging for the DVDs and toys based on those properties, and has also done design work for video games.

== Early life ==
Adi Granov was born in 1977 in Sarajevo, SR Bosnia and Herzegovina, Yugoslavia. He began drawing at an early age, though he did not consider pursuing it as a career until he was sixteen. In 1994, 16-year-old Granov fled Bosnia with his mother and his sister, four years his junior, to escape the Bosnian War. They immigrated to the United States, where Granov spent the next ten years living in Portland, Oregon and Seattle, Washington, where Granov studied art and concept design at a university. He was influenced mostly by European comics and American poster artists, as well as some few manga artists. He has cited Moebius, Sergio Toppi, Tanino Liberatore, Katsuhiro Otomo, Syd Mead, Richard Amsel, and specifically the airbrush technique of Drew Struzan and Hajime Sorayama, though he stated in a 2010 interview that he considers himself "a drawer, not a painter."

== Career ==
Granov spent his last three years in the U.S. in Chicago doing design work for Nintendo Software Technology, working on Bionic Commando and Wave Race: Blue Storm, among other titles. He provided illustrations for Wizards of the Coast on their Star Wars and Wheel of Time games, and illustrated "Masters of Destiny", a short story for Metal Hurlant #10, an anthology magazine by Humanoids Publishing. While in Chicago he obtained his first illustration work for a Dreamwave Productions, a comics publisher based in Toronto, Ontario, Canada. Though his work on their book, NecroWar (2003), was well-received, the publisher filed for bankruptcy, at which point Granov had not been paid for several months, impinging upon his ability to pay his rent.

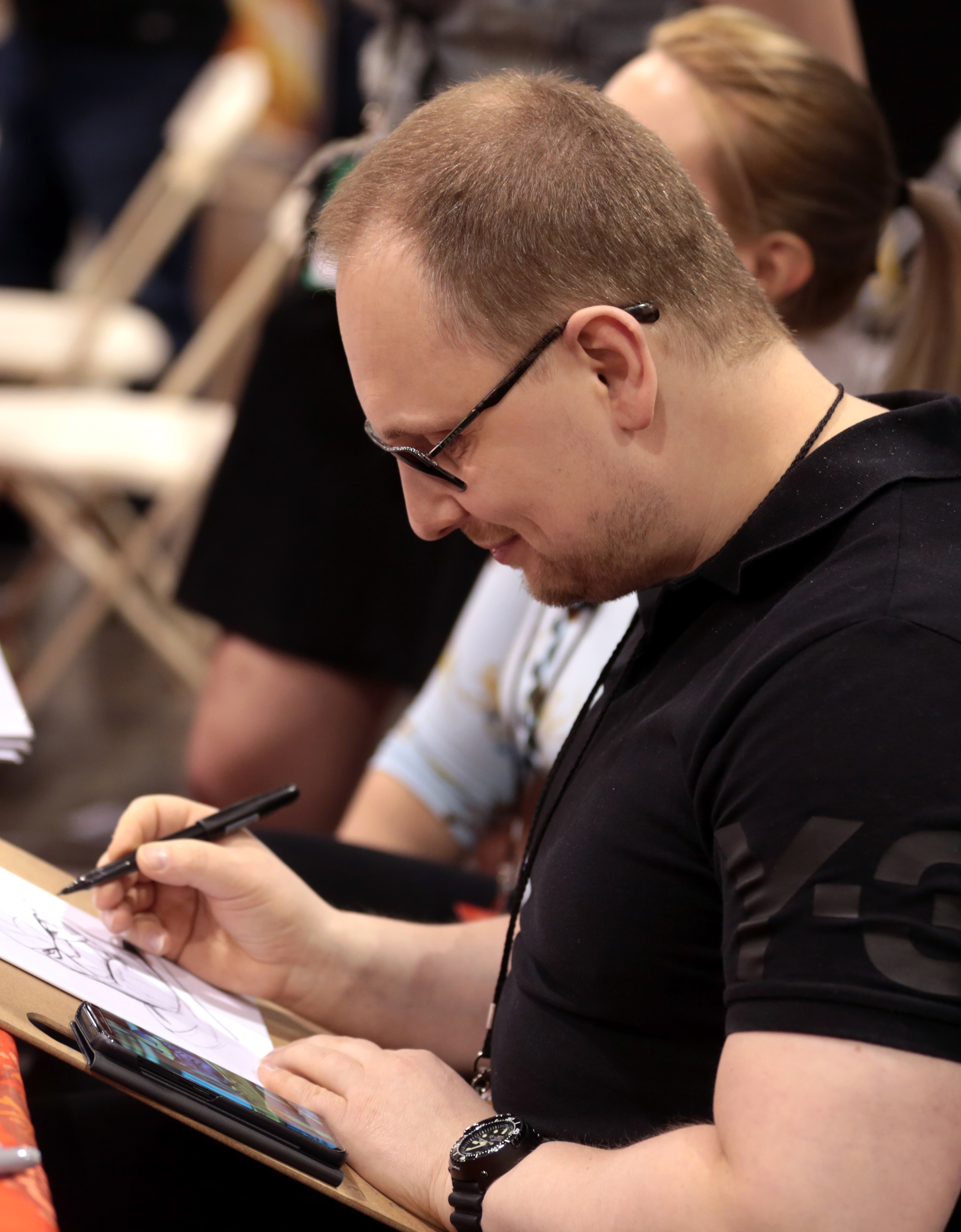
Granov at the 2018 Phoenix Comic Fest

In a 2014 interview, he stated that he had been working as an illustrator and a concept artist for many years prior when he showed a portfolio of comics artwork to a company at San Diego Comic-Con. As Granov put it, "one thing led to another," until he received an unsolicited email from an editor at Marvel Comics, expressing a positive view of his artwork, and inviting to work for Marvel. Granov accepted, and his first job for them was interior and the cover artwork for the 2004 Iron Man Poster Book. His work was a success, and as a result, Granov was teamed with writer/novelist Warren Ellis for the 2005–06, six-issue miniseries Iron Man: Extremis. Though the character at that point was considered an unpopular, third tier character, Extremis is considered one of the best Iron Man comics ever produced, revitalizing interest in the character, and gaining the attention of film director Jon Favreau, who hired Granov one of the three key design and concept artists on the 2008 film Iron Man. The "Extremis" storyline would subsequently be adapted into the 2013 film Iron Man 3. In 2004 Marvel Editor-in-Chief Joe Quesada named Granov as one of the Young Guns, a group of artists who have the qualities to make "a future superstar penciler".

Granov's subsequent cover work for Marvel includes books such as She-Hulk, Inhumans, Thor, X-Men, The Amazing Spider-Man, Black Widow, Hulk, Captain America, Fantastic Four. He has illustrated short stories for Astonishing X-Men and "Dark Reign" titles.

In May 2008, the Iron Man feature film was released, for which Granov helped design the Iron Man and Iron Monger suits, and did key-frame illustrations that indicated how the designs would behave while in motion. Granov also directed the building of 3D models at Stan Winston Studios, working alongside the production's two other key designers, Phil Saunders and Ryan Meinerding. That same month, Marvel debuted Iron Man: Viva Las Vegas, a two-issue miniseries written by director Jon Favreau, and illustrated by Granov, which pit the armored Avenger against Fin Fang Foom.

Granov would later do concept work on the 2012 film The Avengers, and on the 2014 film The Amazing Spider-Man 2. He has also provided artwork for the packaging of action figures and other toys based on those characters.

Granov provided the illustrations for the packaging of the band Tool's 21st anniversary re-release of their debut album, Opiate. He has worked on packaging illustration, design and consulting for high-end toy company Play Imaginative for their line of collectible Iron Man figures.

In July 2018, Insomniac Games revealed the PlayStation 4 video game Spider-Man, which features a Granov-designed suit worn by Spider-Man called the Velocity Suit.

== Personal life ==
When Granov started posting his work on an Internet art forum, he became friends with that site's moderator, an Ilkley, West Yorkshire native named Tamsin Isles. They eventually met and married, and made their home in Ilkey. Granov says of the town, "Ilkley was the first place I saw in England. I had always lived in cities, Sarajevo, Portland, Seattle, Los Angeles for a few months, Chicago... but to see the moors and the countryside and the beautiful town..." Tamsin arranges his convention appearances, handles sales of his art, and also helped organize Thought Bubble, a comics convention based in Leeds.

Granov is fond of mechanical devices such as airplanes, trains, cars, watches, etc. His hobbies include beekeeping and rebuilding his 1967 Lotus Elan. He is also an ardent fan of science fiction.

== Bibliography ==
=== Marvel Comics ===
==== Interior work ====
- The Amazing Spider-Man (Venom story) #568 (2008)
- Dark Reign: The Cabal one-shot (2009)
- Iron Man, vol. 4, #1-6 (2005–06)
- Iron Man: Viva Las Vegas, unfinished miniseries, #1-2 (2008)
- Tales of Suspense Commemorative Edition: Captain America and Iron Man #1 (2005)
- X-Men Unlimited #2 (2004)
- Young Guns Sketchbook 2004 (2005)
- Captain America: Living Legend #1-4 (2013) (Credited in issue #1 as penciller and co-writer w/ Andy Diggle; Issues #2-4 credited as writer w/ Andy Diggle.)

==== Cover work ====
- Agents of Atlas, 12-part limited series, #3, 11 (2009)
- Assault on New Olympus #1 (2010)
- The Amazing Spider-Man #569, 595, 602, 608-610, 612 (2008–09)
- The Amazing Spider-Man Family #1 (2008)
- Avengers/Invaders #3 (2007)
- Black Widow: Deadly Origin, miniseries, #1-3 (2009–10)
- Cable, vol. 2, #6 (2008)
- Captain America: Hail Hydra #1-6 (2010)
- Dark Avengers #1 (2009)
- Darth Vader #1- (2015-)
- Nova, vol. 4, #1-10 (2007), 21 (2009)
- Fantastic Four #538-543 (2006)
- Incredible Hulk #636 (2011)
- Inhumans, vol. 3, #8-12 (2004)
- Invaders Now #1 (2010)
- Iron Man, vol. 3, #75-83 (2004)
- Iron Man, vol. 4, #1-15 (2005–07), 29-35 (2008–09)
- Iron Man: I Am Iron Man #1-2 (2010)
- Iron Man 2: Public Identity (2010)
- New Avengers #5, 24 (2005–06)
- New Mutants, vol. 3, #12-14 (2010)
- Secret Warriors #7 (along with Jim Cheung) (2009)
- Secret Avengers #13-15 (2011)
- She-Hulk, vol. 2, #1-4 (2004)
- Siege Embedded #1-4 (2010)
- Silver Surfer, vol. 3, #5, 8 (2004)
- Skaar: Son of Hulk #13 (2009)
- Thor: Son of Asgard, miniseries, #1-6 (2004)
- Thunderbolts #141-143 (2010)
- Uncanny X-Men #523-525 (2010)
- War of Kings #5 (2009)
- Wolverine: Weapon X #4 (2009)
- X-Force, vol. 3, #26-28 (2010)
- X-Men, vol. 3, #1-6 (2010), 20-23 (2011)
- X-Men: Legacy #231-233, 235-237 (2010)
- X-Men Origins: Cyclops, one-shot (2010)
- X-Men: Second Coming #1-2 (2010)

==== Collected editions ====
- Iron Man Extremis (Collects Iron Man, vol. 4, #1-6 tpb, 160 pages, softcover, 2007, ISBN 0-7851-2258-3, hardcover, ISBN 0-7851-1612-5)
