= Thor: Son of Asgard (video game) =

2011 video game

- Developer: Disney Mobile Games Studios
- Publisher: Marvel Entertainment
- Writer: Bryan J.L. Glass
- Platform: iOS
- Release: 10 May 2011
- Genre: Beat 'em up
- Mode: Single player

Thor: Son of Asgard is a beat 'em up video game developed by Disney Mobile's Prague studio for iOS, based on Marvel Comics' Thor.

The story is based on a comics version of Thor. Cutscenes are made from comic book-styled animation. The character itself is on the other hand based on his movie version, his persona and the suit.

== Gameplay ==
The player controls the character Thor. The game features a simple beat 'em up gameplay. The player fights hordes of enemies. His weapon is his hammer that can be used to hit enemies or block their attack. He can also use some combos including one hitting all enemies nearby by bolts of lightning.

== Plot ==
Son of Asgard picks up in an alternate dimension of where the Thor film leaves off and sees the Odinson dealing with the fallout of Loki’s actions in his absence. The game follows Thor as he seeks to find out why his sister Sif has apparently betrayed Asgard and joined its enemies. His tasks lead him to a variety of worlds including for example Jotuheim and Alfeim. He has to face enemies including Dark Elves, Trolls, Frost Giants and the Midgard Serpent.

== Reception ==
The game has received mixed to negative reviews. It was praised for its graphics but criticized for its gameplay. It was also praised for its vocal work and further look to the universe of Thor.

Most of the reviews criticised the game for being repetitive. This objection is linked to a lack of upgrades that some reviewers noted. Controls were also criticised for being frustrating and the combat system for lacking in depth, being only about button mashing. The animation was also criticised by some critics for being poor.
