= Loki (Marvel Comics) =

Marvel Comics fictional character

- Various incarnations of Loki as depicted in Loki: Agent of Asgard #8 (November 2014). Art by Lee Garbett.

Publication information
- Publisher: Marvel Comics
- First appearance: Venus #6 (August 1949) (Golden Age); Journey into Mystery #85 (October 1962) (Silver Age)
- Created by: Stan Lee; Larry Lieber; Jack Kirby

In-story information
- Full name: Loki Laufeyson
- Species: Jötunn (Frost Giant)
- Place of origin: Jotunheim, Asgard
- Team affiliations: Frost Giants; Dark Council; Cabal; Mighty Avengers; Acts of Vengeance; Young Avengers; Astonishing Avengers
- Partnerships: Enchantress; Executioner
- Notable aliases: Loki Odinson; God of Mischief; God of Stories; God of Lies; God of Evil; Lady Loki; Serrure; Ikol
- Abilities: Genius-level intellect; Superhuman strength, speed, stamina, agility, durability, reflexes, healing, and longevity; Skilled hand-to-hand combatant; Asgardian sorcery granting: Energy projection; Astral projection; Illusion casting; Transmutation; Shapeshifting; Teleportation; Telekinesis; Hypnosis

Loki Laufeyson is a character appearing in American comic books published by Marvel Comics. Created by writer Stan Lee, scripter Larry Lieber, and penciller Jack Kirby, he is based on the Norse mythological deity of the same name. Although a version of Loki debuted in Venus #6 (August 1949), his characterization as the adoptive brother and nemesis of the superhero Thor was introduced with the version that debuted in Journey into Mystery #85 (October 1962), which has persisted to the modern age.

In his comic book appearances, Loki is depicted as the Asgardian God of Mischief, a cunning trickster, and a master of Asgardian magic and sorcery. After learning of his true origin as a Frost Giant from Jotunheim, Loki grows jealous of Thor and frequently plots to take the throne of Asgard for himself. His schemes of conquest ultimately reach Earth and inadvertently lead to the formation of the Avengers. While usually portrayed as a supervillain, Loki has also been an antihero at times, working with heroes if their goals align and if it benefits him.

Loki has appeared in several ongoing series, limited series and alternate reality series, including the 4-issue series Loki in 2004 and 2006, being the main character of Journey into Mystery from issues 622 to 645, appearing in new issues of Young Avengers in 2013 and receiving four more solo series, Loki: Agent of Asgard in 2013, Vote Loki in 2016, Loki: The God Who Fell to Earth in 2019 and Loki: The Liar in 2023.

The character has been adapted in various media incarnations, having most notably been portrayed by Tom Hiddleston in the Marvel Cinematic Universe (MCU) media franchise.

== Publication history ==
Loki's first appearance in the Venus comics (1949)

A version of Loki made his first Marvel Comics appearance in Timely Comics' publication Venus #6 (August 1949), where Loki is depicted as a member of the Olympian gods. Planning to spread hate, he convinces Jupiter to let him travel to the realm of Earth, using Venus already being allowed onto it as his justification. Venus pledges herself to Loki's service to stop his plans, with Jupiter seeing her unselfish act and freeing her from the pledge, with Loki subsequently being sent back to the Underworld. The modern-age Loki made his first official Marvel appearance in Journey into Mystery #85 (Oct. 1962), where Loki is reintroduced as Thor's sworn enemy. The modern age Loki was introduced by brothers and co-writers Stan Lee and Larry Lieber and was redesigned by Jack Kirby.

As one of Thor's arch-nemeses, Loki has frequently made appearances in Thor-related titles like Journey into Mystery and Thor, as well as other Marvel Universe titles such as The Avengers and X-Men, and brief appearances in the Spider-Man and The Defenders comic series. He was a central character in the 1985 limited series X-Men and Alpha Flight, which Marvel's editor-in-chief Jim Shooter hyped as "probably the biggest event in the life of Loki since his first appearance."

He was the starring character in two four-issue Loki miniseries in 2004 and 2010. Loki plays a key role in the 2010s company-wide Siege storyline, in which the character is killed.

Starting with issue #622 the ongoing series Thor reverted to the original title Journey into Mystery and shifted focus to Loki. Under the pen of Kieron Gillen, Loki is resurrected but exists in a child's body, remaining the main character from 2011 to 2012, his final issue as lead being #645.

Gillen, joined by penciller Jamie McKelvie, continued his Loki storyline by introducing Loki, still as Kid Loki, as a main character in the second Young Avengers, which began in 2013. In issue #11, he manipulates Wiccan into restoring him to his teenaged form.

A solo series for Loki called Loki: Agent of Asgard was announced for 2014. Writer Al Ewing said that among other things, the series would explore Loki's bisexuality and fluid gender identity, writing "Loki is bi and I'll be touching on that. [He will be] shift[ing] between genders occasionally as well."

Another solo series for Loki called Vote Loki started in 2016. In this series Loki decides to run in the US presidential election, but loses seemingly after his tricks are uncovered by the media; he is later revealed to have lost intentionally on behalf of the then-winning candidate.

== Fictional character biography ==
Many years ago, when Bor, ruler of Asgard, was battling frost giants, he followed a wounded giant to a powerful sorcerer that was waiting for him. The sorcerer caught him unaware, turning Bor into snow. Bor's son, Odin, found his father as he was blowing away; Bor begged Odin to find a sorcerer to free him, but Odin made no attempt to save his father. Bor cursed Odin saying that he would take in the son of a fallen king and raise it as his own. Not a week later, Odin himself led the Asgardians into battle against the Frost Giants and killed Laufey, who was the King, in personal combat. After slaying Laufey, Odin found a small Asgardian-sized child hidden within the primary stronghold of the Frost Giants. The child was Loki; Laufey having kept him hidden from the Frost Giant people due to his shame over his son's small size. Odin took the child, out of a combination of pity, to appease the memory of his father, and because he was the child of a worthy adversary slain in honorable combat, and raised as his own alongside his biological son Thor.

Throughout his childhood and into adolescence, Loki was resentful of the differences between how Thor and himself were treated by the citizens of Asgard. The Asgardians valued great strength, tenacity, and bravery in battle above all things, and Loki was clearly inferior to his brother Thor in those areas. What he lacked in size and strength, however, he made up for in power and skill, particularly as a sorcerer. As Loki grew to adulthood, his natural talent for causing mischief would make itself manifest and earned him a nickname as the "God of Mischief"; his mischievousness eventually became malice as his hunger for power and revenge grew stronger. Several times he tried to use tricks to get rid of Thor, such as telling him to guard a hole in the wall that he himself had made. In time, his reputation grew from being a playful and mischievous trickster to the "God of Evil".

Over the centuries, Loki attempted on many occasions to seize the rulership of Asgard and to destroy Thor, even helping the Storm Giant Ghan to escape Thor planning to get a debt from him later, and aided other enemies of Asgard, planning to take over. Odin eventually grew tired of Loki's schemes and sealed him within the trunk of a great tree; he would be set free only when a single tear was shed by an Asgardian. Loki eventually freed himself by causing a leaf to strike Heimdall, the guardian of Bifrost, in the eye, which made him shed a tear. Unwelcome to remain in Asgard, Loki began traveling. He encountered the rogue sorcerer Eldred who taught him black magic, repaying Eldred by later giving him to the Fire demon Surtur.

=== Battles with Earth's heroes ===
Loki's schemes come to include Earth, and he often fights with Earth's superhuman heroes to take their planet, and often Asgard. He first battles Thor on Earth in modern times after escaping from the tree; after saving his adoptive brother from drowning, Thor simply throws him all the way back to Asgard. Loki then manipulates the Hulk into wreaking havoc using an illusion of dynamite on train tracks, in an attempt to lure Thor to Earth. This leads to the formation of the Avengers as several other heroes come to meet the Hulk.

Thor is one of the founding members of this superhuman team, and often leads them into battle against Loki. Several times Loki, while not directly battling Thor, causes other threats for Thor to battle, like increasing the mental powers of a carnival fortune teller Sandu, making him powerful enough to lift buildings with his mind, and releasing a Lava Man called Molto by accident when causing a long-dead volcano to explode. When Loki convinces Odin to punish Thor, Odin takes away half of Thor's power, after which Loki returns the memory of the 23rd-century villain Zarrko. Zarrko defeats Thor and takes him back to help conquer his time period, although the God of Thunder finally captures the villain. Loki releases Mr. Hyde and Cobra by paying their bail, then doubles their powers. Loki tells them to kidnap Jane Foster, which he knows would attract Thor's attention, but Hyde and Cobra are again defeated. Loki finally goes after Jane himself, sending her to another dimension. However Doctor Strange protects her, and Thor forces Loki to return her.

Among Loki's better-known henchmen was the human criminal Carl Creel, whom Loki transformed into the superhuman criminal known as the Absorbing Man. Creel would prove to be a formidable adversary to Thor and other Avengers over the years. Loki attempts to turn Odin against Thor and to steal Thor's enchanted hammer Mjolnir in an attempt to attain freedom, but his efforts fail. Upon convincing Odin to go to Earth and leave him in charge of Asgard with part of the Odinforce, he releases Skagg, the largest Storm Giant, and Surtur, the largest Fire Demon, to try to destroy Odin. However, Thor and Balder help defeat the monsters, and Loki is sent to serve the Trolls. Loki is responsible for the Destroyer being awakened, by leading a Hunter to the Temple where the Destroyer armor resides using their mental abilities while Thor is nearby, causing the soul of the Hunter to animate the armor, but Thor forces the Hunter to return to his body, then buries the armor under thousands of tons of rock. The Absorbing Man is brought back to Earth by Loki, and battles Thor, but Loki takes him to Asgard when Thor is on the verge of defeating them. The Absorbing Man defeats the Asgardians without too much trouble and absorbs Odin's attacks. However, Loki and the Absorbing Man are exiled into space due to a trick by Odin. He sends his astral form back to Earth and takes over the Destroyer armor, attempting to take over Asgard; Odin then sends Balder to discover the location of Loki and use his powers to send Loki out of the Destroyer armor.

=== Taking over Asgard ===
Loki's destiny to be the cause of Ragnarök is later recounted. Loki returns from exile in space, but is then stripped of his powers and exiled to Earth by Odin. Loki plots to gain new powers from Karnilla; however, this accidentally creates the Wrecker, who gains Asgardian powers upon being mistaken for Loki after knocking him out and putting on his helmet just before Karnilla appears in response to Loki's ritual. He almost kills Thor by collapsing a building on him, as Thor had been stripped of all his powers except his strength by Odin. Loki then foments a battle between Thor and the Destroyer animated by Sif. Loki takes command of Asgard during the Odinsleep, using his right as the 'son' of Odin before Thor could claim it, but flees when Asgard is invaded by Mangog, realizing that this new foe is too powerful.

Loki later usurps the throne of Asgard by taking the Odinring, but flees again when Asgard is invaded by Surtur. He attempts to destroy Thor by switching bodies with him, granting him Thor's raw strength against his own inexperienced use of magic in Thor's hands. Thor tricks Loki into throwing Mjolnir away so that it becomes stuck in a cliff, causing Thor's (Loki's) body to return to the human form of Donald Blake and allowing Thor to regain control of his true form. Much later, Loki usurps the throne of Asgard again and sets the Destroyer against Thor once more. Loki causes the temporary death of Balder using mistletoe, having conspired with Hela to cause Ragnarök if his last plan failed. At this time, Loki's estranged wife Sigyn returns to Asgard. When Loki is chained and a viper drips poison on his face as punishment for killing Balder, Sigyn tries helping him. Loki attempts to bring about Ragnarök, but is foiled by Odin. Alongside Tyr and his forces, Loki steals the golden apples of Idunna and invades Asgard with help from the Midgard Serpent, but then changes sides and aids Odin's forces in defeating Tyr.

Despite Loki's seeming hatred of his adoptive brother and father, Loki helps to defend Asgard from destruction from Surtur and his fire demons, because Surtur's goal was to destroy Asgard, whereas Loki sought only to rule it. Alongside Odin and Thor, Loki witnesses the seeming demise of Odin. Loki transforms Thor into a frog for a time, using the Twilight Sword. Thor is turned back when Volstagg destroys one of the machines Loki used to transform Thor. He then attempts to gain favor with "Those Who Sit Above in Shadow" by creating a mystical fountain which grants superpowers to all who come in contact with it. However, a group of airline passengers who receive these powers discover that the fountain also removes their ability to imagine and create new things, and reject Loki's gift. When Loki attempts to coerce them into accepting the fountain, Those Who Sit Above in Shadow determine that Loki has failed their test.

==== Acts of Vengeance ====
In disguise, Loki manipulates a group of master villains into engineering the "Acts of Vengeance". With these prime movers, he sends the Juggernaut against Thor, and casts a spell that causes temporary bouts of weakness in Thor. He then battles the combined forces of the West Coast and East Coast Avengers. His identity and role in the proceedings is ultimately revealed, and he is then defeated by the Avengers. Loki dies at the hands of Thor, although manipulation of the time stream later brings him back. During this time, Loki travels to the dimension of the Ultraverse to seek out the Infinity Gems.

=== Lady Loki ===
Loki's first female form, taken from Lady Sif. Art by Olivier Coipel

Morwen, a powerful agent of chaos, is released and takes Tessa Black, a daughter of Loki from his female form, as a host. With Doctor Strange unavailable, Loki and Spider-Man work together to free her. Loki proclaims that he owes an as-of-yet unpaid debt to his temporary ally.

A short while later, Loki is prophesied to lead Asgard's enemies into destroying the "Eternal Realm" in a final conflict known as Ragnarök, part of the continuing Asgardian cycle of the birth, life, and death presided over by beings known as "Those Who Sit Above in Shadow" who draw sustenance from the energies expended during these cycles. In the final confrontation between the brothers before that battle, Thor hangs Loki's head from his belt so he can watch the final moments of the battle.

After Ragnarök, Loki returns in a female body working with Doctor Doom so Thor would unwittingly resurrect his Asgardian enemies and manipulates Balder to make him the new successor to the throne of Asgard. Secretly, Loki additionally retains his male form, carrying Thor's reborn lover Sif within himself as his daughter. Hela and Loki use magic to send Loki to the past to cause the events that led to his younger self being adopted by Odin as a means to eliminate Bor, Thor's grandfather.

During the Secret Invasion, Loki goads the Asgardians into believing Beta Ray Bill is a Skrull, but Thor shows that Loki was lying. After the Skrulls are defeated, he joins the Cabal, consisting of himself, Norman Osborn, Emma Frost, Doctor Doom, Namor, and the Hood, so Osborn can launch his new world order, promising Loki that he could restore Asgard back to the heavens where it belongs.

=== Dark Reign ===
During the "Dark Reign" storyline, Quasimodo researches Loki for Norman Osborn. He advises Osborn not to trust Loki due to her status as a trickster goddess and only help if she gets something out of it. Loki and Sif are restored to their respective bodies and following the Hood's depowerment, Loki offers him a second chance.

Loki as the Scarlet Witch

The Scarlet Witch appeared in her astral form recruiting a team of Avengers to face the Elder God Chthon. It is revealed that Wanda was Loki in disguise. The Avengers, unaware of Loki's trick, followed the false "Wanda's" instructions. Her goal was to throw Norman Osborn off-balance, as shown during the second meeting of the Cabal. After Thor was banished due to her trickery, Loki intended to put "cracks in Osborn's armor" and gradually "widen" these cracks through the Mighty Avengers. Pietro Maximoff, desiring to see and converse with his sister, joined the Mighty Avengers. He raced around the world searching for her, not knowing that his nephews Billy and Tommy had just done so and also failed to find her.

However, Loki had planned on the deaths of Pietro and Cassandra Lang, fearing they may form wedges in his plans. Cutting off communications from the former, they tried to convince Hank Pym to expel Cassie after placing a spell on her to prevent her from saying anything bad about their disguise. The latter, however, invited her fellow Young Avengers into the Infinite Avengers Mansion (an extension of the PymPocket), to prove that the Scarlet Witch was evil. When Wiccan cast a spell to bring Scarlet Witch to them, Loki appeared as Scarlet Witch and stated that Cassandra Lang sealed their fate. Just then, Ronin appeared and ambushed the "Scarlet Witch". He determined that she was not Wanda by kissing her and stating that the real Scarlet Witch would have used her power to revive Cassandra's father. Wiccan then chanted a spell to reveal Loki's true form. Afraid of exposure, Loki was forced to leave, swearing all their deaths. The continued achievements of the Mighty Avengers strained Osborn to the breaking point. Loki decided to play the final card that would break Osborn by unleashing the Absorbing Man, who had absorbed the power of the Cosmic Cube. In the Dark Avengers, Loki secreted himself inside Norman Osborn's office in his female form, manipulating Osborn into becoming the Green Goblin again, as Siege begins.

=== Siege ===
Loki was present at the Cabal when Norman Osborn denied to bring Namor to Doctor Doom. When the Doombot posing as Doctor Doom unleashed insect-like robots, Loki advised the Hood to take flight. Following Osborn's talk with the President, Loki advised to recreate an incident similar to the Stamford Incident that would bring about the invasion upon Asgard.

He then reveals a plot to Osborn that would take advantage of Volstagg's presence in Chicago. Since Volstagg has gone for adventures like Thor, the U-Foes could attack him and destroy Soldier Field during an American football game, killing thousands while Osborn and he watched in astral form. Loki then warns Balder about Osborn's impending attack on Asgard, claiming that he had tried to convince Osborn not to attack. killing the Asgardian who actually prophesied the attack and sending Heimdall's chamber beneath Asgard so he could not warn the Asgardians in time. Loki, when Osborn called out for his aid, sent the Hood and his diminished syndicate as reinforcements to help Osborn's forces against the Avengers. Loki later appeared to Balder, telling him that he would have simply pardoned Thor instead of banishing him if he had not wanted the throne of Asgard for himself. Balder later banished Loki from Asgard.

Sometime after, he magically disguised himself as Osborn's Green Goblin persona to lay siege to Asgard, Loki encountered the Disir (the Valkyries of Bor) after he lured them using several wandering god's souls he imprisoned as bait, revealing that he desired to gain their service as his slaves. The 13 Disir unite and assault him as one, but Loki managed to defeat them using extraordinary swordsmanship skills, thus forcing them to submit to him and declare him the victor. Loki meets with Hela and asks her what she will give him in exchange for a new Hel, to which she answers 'Anything.' She then met with Mephisto, demonstrating the power of the Disir and agreeing to lend him the Disir for a hundred and one days in exchange for the demon lord granting a portion of his netherworld to Hela for one thousand and one years, as her new "Hel", which Mephisto agrees to. In exchange for this, Hela erased Loki from the Books of Hel, thus, he was no longer tied to Hel or Asgard, gaining absolute freedom. Mephisto asked Loki why he had resorted to such schemes, to which Loki replied it was more fun this way.

When the combined forces of the New Avengers, Young Avengers, and the Secret Warriors defeated the Dark Avengers, Thor demanded to know where Loki was. Norman Osborn could only tell him that he was dead, just like "the rest of them" as the true form of the Void appeared. As the creature tore apart the three teams, Loki began to repent, realizing that what had happened to Asgard was not what he wanted, begging his father, Odin, to return to him the Norn Stones (which were previously taken away from the Hood and given to the trickster), using their power to empower the three teams and give the powers of the Hood's gang to them to fight back against the Void. However, the Void sensed Loki's hand in this and attacked him, the stones having not affected the Void directly. As Loki was torn apart by the Void's tendrils in front of a shocked Thor, his last words were to apologize to his brother. Thor resolved to avenge his fallen brother and destroyed the Void and the Sentry with a lightning strike.

=== Reincarnation as Kid Loki ===
Loki reincarnated, in Thor #617

Thor, missing his brother, searched for Loki who had returned to life in the form of a young boy; as due to his schemes his name was removed from the Book of Hell, allowing him to permanently cheat death. Now located in Paris, France, Loki was a street hustler going by the name of Serrure (the French word for lock), who feigned simple card tricks in front of an audience while an accomplice pickpocketed them. Thor, in civilian disguise, gave chase, resulting in the restoration of Loki's memory, but not of his past life with the exception of a guilty conscience for things he cannot remember. With nothing to lose, Loki followed Thor, who restored part of his identity to him (though he remained in the form of a child), and asked when precisely Thor got so old, to which Thor smiled. Thor took Loki to the remains of Asgard, where plans were made to help the refugees of the World Tree. With the resurrection of Odin, Loki was frightened away and fled with Thor, who lambasted Odin for scaring him away. Running into Iron Man, Loki was saved by Thor, who defended his own reasons for bringing the trickster back.

==== Journey into Mystery ====
With the Asgardian population other than Thor still wary of Loki, Loki revealed to his brother that he was attempting to learn more about Earth and humans, to which Thor approves. When a magpie exploded in his quarters carrying a key, it led to a chain of events where at the end, Loki was contacted by an echo of his former incarnation, who revealed he chose to sacrifice himself fighting the Void as part of a greater plan which would involve his death and return. The child Loki refused to follow this path, wanting to be his own person, and transformed the spirit of his former self into a magpie named Ikol. On returning to Earth, he witnessed Odin striking down Thor.

Odin prepared all of Asgard for an unknown battle and imprisoned Thor for attempting to protect Midgard from being scoured. Loki, who disagreed with Odin's actions, was put to work by Volstagg into cleaning the stables of Thor's goats to keep him out of trouble and danger. Using the wool of one of the goats, Loki descended into the roots of the world tree at the advice of Ikol to ask questions from the Nornish women who live there. After receiving answers, Loki wept but decided to turn to the imprisoned Thor for his opinion before making his final decision. Breaking into the prison by stealth, Loki asked his brother what he would do if he had to let something bad happen to prevent something worse from happening, and what if it cost him everything. With Thor's answer, Loki decided to free one of the imprisoned Hel Wolves and bind it to him in servitude using the bridle of Thor's goats, then revealing he would need help from one more 'personage' before heading for the realm of Hela.

Having recovered Thor's hammer after Thor had been killed and erased from memory following the war against the Serpent, Loki was able to work with the Silver Surfer to restore the hammer to its natural state and send it to Thor in the afterlife, restoring his memory and allowing him to fight his way back into the realm of the living. After Thor's return, Ikol would afterward reveal that circumstances had been manipulated to force the young Loki to allow his former personality to subsume him and live again, his former slate wiped clean by the "new" Loki's actions. During his adventures, the young Loki had inadvertently helped create and was tied to a powerful artifact that was about to be used by Mephisto to conquer all the Hells and ultimately everything. However, if the new Loki ceased to be, the artifact would lose all power. Seeing no other option, Loki allowed Ikol to become Loki again, ceasing to be, but warning beforehand that the Ikol personality was incapable of true change and believing this older persona would ultimately be prevented from changing by those around him.

==== Young Avengers ====
Kid Loki joined the Young Avengers in the 2013 relaunch of the series as part of Marvel NOW!. When Wiccan and Hulkling are captured by an interdimensional parasite known as Mother, Loki comes to their aid and rescues them from the prison that they were being held in. They admit that they need help to defeat the creature, but are wary of trusting Loki, knowing who he is. They go to Asgard, and are met with Loki's father. With the help of Miss America, the team flee to New York City, but are captured by Mother. They are saved by Kate Bishop and Noh-Varr, but they are then attacked by citizens of New York City who fall under the control of Mother as the team flies by in Noh-Var's ship. The team flees to Central Park to minimize the number of civilians in the area. Once there, Loki tells the group that their only choice to save themselves is to either kill Wiccan, or allow Loki to borrow Wiccan's powers for ten minutes so that he can save them. Seeing no other option, Wiccan agrees, and Loki immediately teleports away, seemingly abandoning the group to face the mob of mind-controlled New Yorkers on his own.

While he originally intended to leave them to die, Loki has an internal conversation with his child self (that still exists within him) whom he killed at the end of Journey into Mystery, and is convinced to return to the team. Once there, he defeats the creature, but the team is forced to leave New York, as Wiccan's spell is still intact. While the rest of the team is busy, Loki meets with Mother, revealing that he had planned everything that had happened with the parasite, working to gain access to Wiccan's immense power so that he can gain back the abilities he lost when he was reincarnated.

The team is left in a situation where neither Wiccan nor Loki are powerful enough to fight Mother. To increase Loki's power, Wiccan ages Loki's body to that of a teenager. Now able to take on Mother, as well as Leah, who had recruited the exes of the other Young Avengers members, the group goes to Mother's dimension to stop things once and for all. In his confrontation with Leah, she taunts him for destroying his younger self. Realizing that she is merely an illusion created by his own guilty conscience, Loki confesses his part in freeing Mother, as well as for killing his younger self. Now sated, the exes and Leah vanish, allowing the Young Avengers to defeat Mother. When Wiccan turns to introduce his teammate to his parents, he finds that Loki is missing, having fled the scene wracked with guilt over his actions. Later, when the team throws a New Year's party, Prodigy sees Loki watching them and confronts him, only to find out that Loki supplied the money behind the party. Loki admits that if he came back, the team would probably forgive him, and therefore he will not show himself, feeling unworthy of their forgiveness. After briefly making a pass at Prodigy, Loki appears to teleport away. As the party ends and the team leaves, Loki looks on fondly at a photo of himself with the team.

=== Agent of Asgard ===
In a mission for the All-Mother, Loki traveled from space to Midgard to collect five keys Odin had once forged for him should he be worthy. Using his sorcery and wits, Loki used the keys to claim Gram, the sword of Sigurd, as his own. He also befriended a human, Verity Willis, with the power to always know if she is being lied to. She and Loki develop a great friendship, and through him she develops friendships with Sigurd and Lorelei, while Loki continues to run missions for the All-Mother. He later discovers that he is being manipulated by King Loki, his villainous and depraved future self, who is much the same as the old Loki was before his death and resurrection. While Loki fears one day becoming King Loki, he also knows that his future self is determined to make it happen.

==== AXIS ====
During the AXIS storyline, Loki appears as a member of Magneto's unnamed superhero group during the fight against Red Skull's Red Onslaught form. A spell by Scarlet Witch and Doctor Doom inadvertently causes a wave which inverts the moralities of all the heroes and villains present. With his basic morality inverted, Loki becomes romantically involved with Amora the Enchantress, although soon finds that his inverted morality is not as straightforward as for the other villains. While before Loki was devious but likeable, Verity quickly sees the new Loki is pious, priggish, and while 'good', disloyal to a fault; he betrays Lorelei and Sigurd to the returned All-Father, Odin, knowing full well that Odin will punish their small crime with a heinous overblown punishment. Later, in the final battle of AXIS, Loki fights his brother (whose morality is also inverted) on the moon, and to their surprise, Loki is able to lift Thor's hammer and beat him with it. His triumph, and feeling of great power and accomplishment, is short-lived; Scarlet Witch's second inversion wave restores Loki and Thor's original moral 'axes'. The hammer drops from Loki's hand, and the scream of the Kid Loki whom he killed is heard for miles, bellowing 'I am the crime that cannot be forgiven'. The effects of Scarlet Witch's spell are seen again later; Loki can no longer tell a lie. In a heart to heart with Thor, he finds himself compelled to admit what happened: that he, as Ikol, murdered the sweet reborn Loki and took his chance at life away. Thor, now seeing Loki not as his brother but as a murderous creature that stole his brother's shot at life, surrenders Loki to Asgard for justice at the hands of their people.

==== God of Stories ====
After Freyja banishes Loki from Asgard, he finds himself on Earth, where King Loki and Verity are. King Loki tells Verity of the awful things Loki did during his time with the Young Avengers, and she flees, not wanting to have to deal with him anymore. King Loki then ties up his younger self and starts telling them why he has done all this. As it turns out, in King Loki's future, Loki did complete his duty as Asgard's agent, clearing all of his horrible deeds from his name. However, he was still viewed as nothing more than the God of Lies, and, being unable to take it anymore, once again became an enemy of Thor; an unknown amount of time later, King Loki destroys the Earth, leaving it a barren wasteland. King Thor confronts King Loki, Loki raising an army of skeletal Avengers, fleeing while Thor fights his undead friends. Realizing that he would never be able to defeat his brother, King Loki goes back in time to a time when Thor was at his weakest, when he lacked the power to wield Mjolnir. By moving the time-table up by only a few years, King Loki could kill Thor while still one day successfully destroying the Earth.

Loki then goes into a metaphorical space, where Old Loki and Kid Loki are, telling him that he will not be able to change his story. Verity then calls him out, telling Loki that because King Loki did not recognize her, an alternate future is already unfolding. Loki now decides to change his destiny, realizing that lies are just stories, and as god of them, he can tell a new one. He then seemingly destroys himself, sending King Loki to the now changed near-future. Eight months pass, and the sky turns red as the Secret Wars is about to begin, when Verity hears a knock on her door, with Loki standing there, claiming to be the "God of Stories".

Loki reborn. Art by Lee Garbett

==== Secret Wars ====
The "Last Days" part of the Secret Wars storyline picks up directly after the prior events with Verity being unsure if she can trust Loki now that he is a different person. Loki tells Verity that she is important in this end of the world event. Meanwhile, King Loki has set the Midgard Serpent free, and plans on using it to destroy Asgard. As King Loki wages war on Asgard, killing gods and cracking jokes, the younger Loki places Verity Willis's soul in a pretty glowing bracelet to protect her from being annihilated along with her physical form when the Multiverse comes to an end. Just as it seems certain that King Loki will defeat the Asgardians, Freyja sacrificed her life to destroy Jormungandr and Odin blows the fabled Gjallarhorn (the Horn of Heroes) to resurrect the dead gods, as foretold, for their final battle. To King Loki's astonishment, Loki is alive and turns up to join the legion of deceased gods in Asgard's defence. Upon being faced with Loki and all the resurrected gods, King Loki loses his nerve and flees into the ether. Loki is hailed by all as a hero. This is exactly what all previous iterations of Loki would have wanted most: attention, adoration, praise. Odin even proudly compares Loki to Thor and calls him "son", but Loki shakes off Odin's promises insisting that he is done taking "sides". Loki and Verity then survive the incursion, and chase away the gods who sit above the Multiverse, who want Loki to surrender the stories of Asgard, which he is keeping in preservation. They also discover King Loki, another survivor of the incursions, and upon explaining that he understands King Loki's motivations. King Loki breaks down in tears, and Loki places his alternate self in his sceptre as a reminder of his potential to commit great evil. Loki then explains that the universe will be reborn, and invites Verity to follow him, into a new reality by creating a door labelled 'Next', although he unsure as to whether he will change again on the other side.

==== Defenders ====
Loki ended up in the Sixth Cosmos, the iteration of the Multiverse before the one he left. He saw a threat on the Outside that could endanger the Eighth Cosmos.and met Taaia, mother of Galactus, who told him she had a device that would allow her to warn Doctor Strange of this potential danger but he suggested instead that he could piggyback of this device with his magic to make a portal to the present. Loki checking on Verity and Asgard, he found Odin's funeral and saw a version of himself in the Eighth Cosmos, despite never entering it. Realizing he was time-displaced and fearing a cyclical fate, he decided to embark on one last adventure before returning.

Joined by Taaia, Loki traveled through a portal to Kadesh, where the Defenders were summoned by Eternity through Strange's tarot cards. Sent to the Neutral Zone to investigate the threat, they encountered the Beyonders, battled the Phoenix Force, and sought aid from the Queen of Nevers. Eventually, they reached the House of Ideas, where Loki saw her future self watching, confirming her plan would work. The One Above All revealed a mysterious upcoming enemy, the "Enigma." Loki decided to leave the story entirely through the House of Ideas to escape the old status quo but was inspired by Blue Marvel’s bodhisattva vow to instead help others break free. To ensure her plan worked, she erased her memories of the journey until the right time.

== Powers and abilities ==
Loki is a member of the race of Frost Giants of Jotunheim, although not a giant in stature. He possesses physical attributes equal to a fit member of his race, such as, enhanced strength, stamina (their Frost Giant metabolism grants him superhuman levels of physical stamina in practically all activities), speed, durability (enough to withstand high-caliber bullets without harm) and immunity to all known diseases and toxins as well as resistance to magic and aging.

Loki possesses genius-level intelligence and has extensive training in magic, and possesses the ability to manipulate magical forces for a variety of purposes: energy projection, creation of force fields, temporarily increasing his own physical capabilities, granting superhuman abilities to living beings or inanimate objects, flight, hypnosis, illusion casting and inter-dimensional teleportation.

Loki's magical abilities have been described as equal to those of Karnilla, the most skilled sorceress of Asgard. His illusion casting can fool cities, and powerful entities such as Surtur. He has been able to break free of Celestial technology in the possession of Apocalypse.

Loki possesses extrasensory abilities and is capable of astral projection and casting his thoughts across great distances—even across dimensional barriers, like that between Asgard and Earth—even if he is unable to move. He cannot read the minds of other beings, although he can influence their actions, and once briefly hypnotized Thor, and controlled a flock of birds. However, he could not coerce Thor to give him Mjolnir. If someone has evil thoughts, Loki can influence their actions (even if they are in Asgard and the subject is on Earth), and can influence other events to some degree, such as diverting a missile from its path, or redirecting a radio signal.

Loki is an adept shapeshifter and can change into animals (examples include transmogrification to a salmon, horse, etc.) or impersonate other people, such as Thor or Captain America. However, he does not necessarily gain the abilities of whatever or whoever he turns into, although minor natural abilities such as flight in bird form tend to work. Loki may mimic the abilities of some supernatural beings if they turn into such creatures. Loki has also turned clouds into dragons, and animated trees to attack Thor. After his rebirth, his shapeshifting abilities are more limited. He explained to Lorelei that, "I can turn into anything, as long as it's me", which he demonstrates by transforming into the female Lady Loki and a lupine form.

Loki has imbued himself with magical abilities that enables him to withstand injuries that would prove fatal to another Asgardian, such as being beheaded by Balder. He has also been shown to be immune to the Controller's control disk, the mental influence of the Voice, and the power-sapping abilities of Rogue.

Loki crafted a method of cheating death, being reincarnated upon any "death" through an arrangement with the various incarnations of Death that his name be erased from the books of Hell.

Loki possesses a brilliant intellect, with some knowledge of technology, as illustrated by the time when he created a machine to amplify Iceman's powers, and when he attached devices to the Twilight sword to tap into its powers. Loki is an expert manipulator and schemer, frequently using pawns in his plans. He is sometimes armed with a sword, a whip, or a three-pronged spear and has used magical items (such as the Norn Stones) to enhance his powers.

== Reception ==
=== Critical response ===
Laura Bradley of Vanity Fair included Loki in their "Stan Lee’s Most Iconic Characters" list. The A.V. Club ranked Loki 1st in their "28 Best Marvel Villains" list. George Marston of Newsarama ranked Loki 4th in their "Best Marvel Supervillains" list, writing, "Loki is one of many popular villains who has moved into being more of an antihero, or even out-and-out superhero, repositioning himself not as the god of lies, but as the god of stories." IGN ranked Loki 8th in their "The Top 100 Comic Book Villains" list, and 4th in their "Top 25 Marvel Villains" list. Riley Bocchicchio of Collider ranked Loki 8th in their "10 Most Powerful Marvel A-Force Members" list. Jason Serafino of Complex ranked Loki 12th in their "25 Greatest Comic Book Villains of All Time" list, writing, "Leave it to Jacky Kirby and Stan Lee to take a character from Norse mythology and turn him into one of the great comic book villains of all time."

Screen Rant included Loki in their "20 Most Powerful Marvel Villains" list, and ranked him 7th in their "25 Greatest Comic Book Supervillains Of All Time" list. CBR.com ranked Loki 3rd in their "10 Most Fashionable Marvel Villains list, 5th in their "13 Most Important Marvel Villains" list, 6th in their "10 Most Popular Marvel Characters" list, and 8th in their "10 Marvel Gods With The Highest Kill Count" list.

== Other versions ==
Loki wears Doctor Strange's Cloak of Levitation and Eye of Agamotto (April 2018). Art by Alex Ross

=== Avenger Prime ===
In an unidentified alternate reality, Loki lost his brother Thor when his attempt to tame a runaway Mjolnir sent him into the Sun. Loki sought counsel with his alternate counterparts, which always ends with them attacking him. He then witnessed a fight between an alternate version of Loki who lost to Captain Carter and her team of Avengers. Then, he sees other Earths who each had a Loki who was responsible for the formation of their Avengers. After returning to his universe, Loki prevents its versions of the Avengers from being formed. After attempting to throw himself into the Sun, Loki finds himself in the God Quarry, where he undergoes penance for his actions. Loki proceeds to build a version of Avengers Tower in the God Quarry so that he can form the Multiversal Avengers.

=== What If... Loki Was Worthy? (Earth-TRN1364) ===
An alternate universe version of Loki is the main focus of the novel What If... Loki Was Worthy? (written by Madeleine Roux). In this universe, Loki is stripped off his powers and banished to Earth after his latest mischief (which involved sabotaging the Destroyer with help from the dwarf Kvisa Röksdóttir) results in the death of Thor and several casualties in New York City. One month after settling in a trailer in Buffalo, New York with his best companion being a gecko named Brian, Loki is put in a redemption mission alongside the Valkyrie Rūna for the fate of Asgard.

== In other media ==
=== Television ===
- Loki appears in the "Mighty Thor" segment of The Marvel Super Heroes, voiced by Len Carlson.
- Loki appears in the Spider-Man and His Amazing Friends episode "The Vengeance of Loki", voiced by John Stephenson.
- Loki appears in The Super Hero Squad Show episode "Oh Brother!", voiced by Ted Biaselli.
- Loki appears in The Avengers: Earth's Mightiest Heroes, voiced by Graham McTavish. In the episode "Thor the Mighty", he manipulates a group of Frost Giants into attacking Asgard while Thor is on Earth, but they are all defeated by Thor while Odin banishes Loki to the Isle of Silence. After the Enchantress frees him in the episode "Masters of Evil", Loki returns in the episodes "This Hostage Earth", "The Fall of Asgard", and "A Day Unlike Any Other" to conquer Asgard and eight of the nine realms by using the Masters of Evil to invade Earth using Karnilla's Norn Stones. While the Avengers destroy the stones, they accidentally transport themselves to each of the eight realms. When Thor is captured, Loki reveals he had a hand in much of the series' events, such as the Avengers and Masters of Evil's formations, and that his initial attack and exile were part of a diversion. Eventually, Loki engages the Avengers and numerous Asgardian warriors in a final showdown, but he is defeated by Ant-Man and banished to a swamp-like realm where he is tortured by the Midgard Serpent.
- Loki appears in Disney XD-produced animated Marvel series, with his normal male form voiced by Troy Baker and occasional female disguises voiced by Vanessa Marshall and Tara Strong.
  - Loki appears in Ultimate Spider-Man.
  - Loki appears in Avengers Assemble. In the fourth season, he uses the Cabal and the Casket of Ancient Winters to take control of Earth. He later allies with the Avengers and the New Avengers to stop the Beyonder. Loki betrays the two groups and steals the Eye of Agamotto, only to be defeated by Thor and Thunderstrike.
  - Loki appears in Hulk and the Agents of S.M.A.S.H.
  - Loki appears in Guardians of the Galaxy.
- Loki appears in Lego Marvel Super Heroes: Maximum Overload, voiced again by Troy Baker.
- Loki appears in Marvel Disk Wars: The Avengers, voiced by Tadashi Muto in Japanese and Crispin Freeman in English. In the series' pilot episode, he and his forces imprison several superheroes and supervillains in D.I.S.K.s and spends the rest of the series working to prevent the Avengers and their allies from finding and retaking them.
- Loki appears in Marvel Super Hero Adventures: Frost Fight!, voiced again by Troy Baker.
- Loki appears in Marvel Super Hero Adventures, voiced by Matt Cowlrick.
- Loki appears in Marvel Future Avengers, voiced by Tadashi Muto in Japanese and Trevor Devall in English. He initially allies himself with the Masters of Evil, but after being betrayed and imprisoned by Kang the Conqueror, he defects and assists the Avengers in stopping Kang's plans.
- Loki appears in The Simpsons short The Good, the Bart, and the Loki, voiced by Tom Hiddleston.
- Loki appears in Marvel Battleworld: Treachery at Twilight, voiced by Bill Newton.
- Loki appears in Lego Marvel Avengers: Loki in Training, voiced by Bill Newton.

=== Film ===
- Loki appears in Hulk Vs Thor, voiced by Graham McTavish.
- A teenage version of Loki appears in Thor: Tales of Asgard, voiced by Rick Gomez.
- Loki appears in Marvel Super Heroes 4D.

=== Marvel Cinematic Universe ===
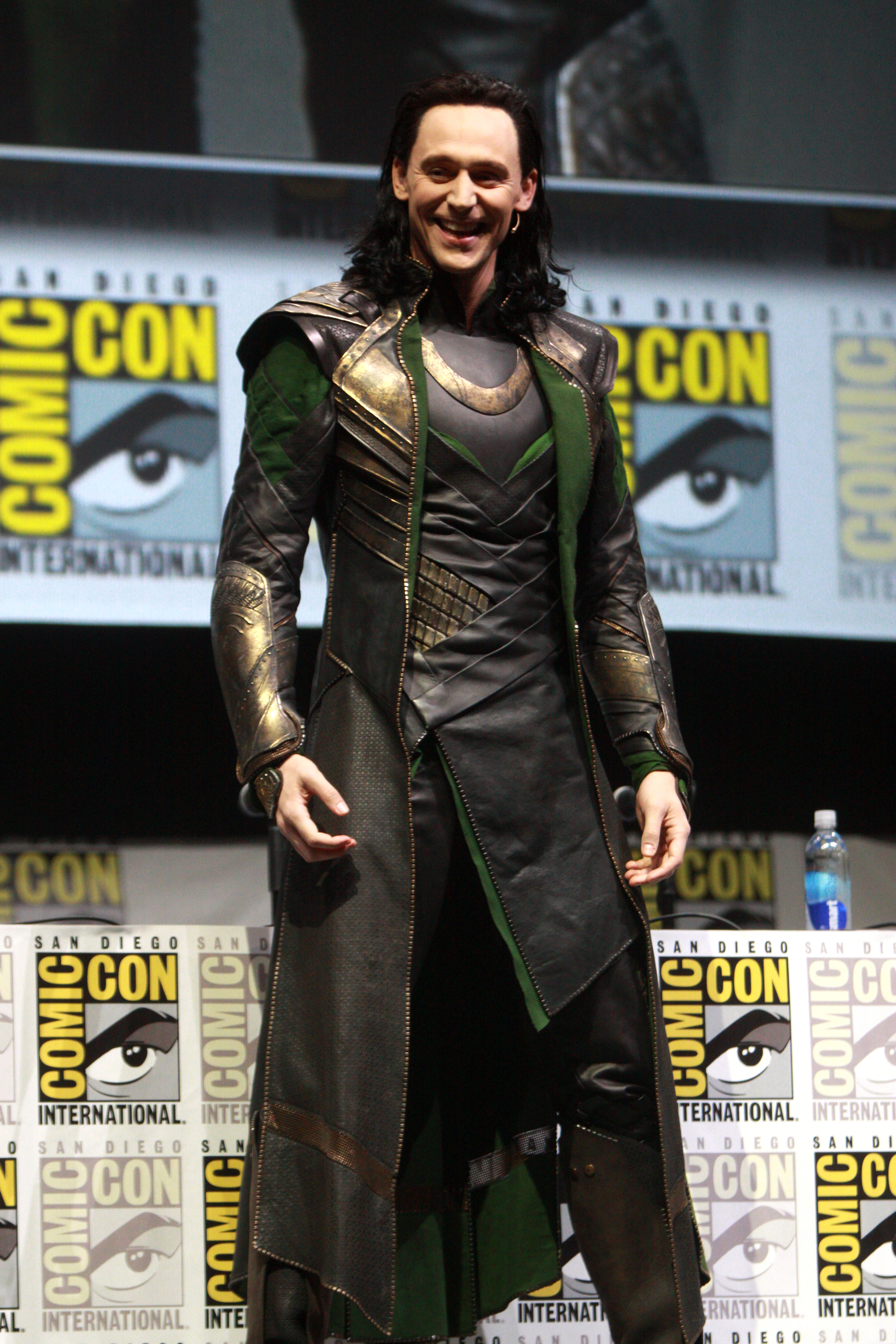
Tom Hiddleston as Loki at the 2013 San Diego Comic-Con.

Tom Hiddleston portrays Loki in media set in the Marvel Cinematic Universe, produced by Marvel Studios. Loki first appears in Thor (2011) and reappears in The Avengers (2012), Thor: The Dark World (2013), Thor: Ragnarok (2017), Avengers: Infinity War (2018), and Avengers: Endgame (2019).

- Ted Allpress portrayed a young Loki in Thor.
- An alternate timeline variant of Loki appears in a self-titled live-action Disney+ series and makes further appearances in the live-action films Ant-Man and the Wasp: Quantumania (2023) and Avengers: Doomsday (2026).
  - A female variant of Loki using the alias Sylvie also appears in Loki, portrayed by Sophia Di Martino.
  - Additionally, several other variants of Loki appear in Loki, such as Kid Loki and Alligator Loki.
- Alternate timeline variants of Loki appear in What If...?.

=== Video games ===
- Loki appears as a non-player character in Marvel: Ultimate Alliance, voiced by Larry Cedar. This version is a lieutenant in Doctor Doom's Masters of Evil.
- Loki appears in Marvel Super Hero Squad, voiced again by Ted Biaselli.
- Loki appears in Marvel Super Hero Squad: The Infinity Gauntlet, voiced again by Ted Biaselli.
- Loki appears in Pinball FX2, voiced by Troy Baker.
- Loki appears in Marvel Pinball, voiced by Troy Baker.
- Loki appears in Marvel KAPOW!.
- Loki appears in Marvel Super Hero Squad Online, voiced by Ted Biaselli.
- Loki appears in Thor: God of Thunder, voiced by Tom Hiddleston.
- Loki appears in Thor: Son of Asgard.
- Loki appears in Marvel War of Heroes.
- Loki appears as a playable character in Marvel Avengers: Battle for Earth, voiced by Troy Baker.
- Loki appears in Marvel Avengers Alliance.
- Loki appears in Zen Pinball 2.
- Loki appears in Avengers Pinball.
- Loki appears as a playable character in Marvel Heroes, voiced by Crispin Freeman (male form) and by Amy Pemberton (female form).
- Loki appears in Lego Marvel Super Heroes, voiced by Troy Baker.
- Loki appears in Marvel Puzzle Quest.
- Loki appears in Thor: The Dark World - The Official Game, voiced by David Wells.
- Loki appears in Disney Tsum Tsum.
- Loki appears in Disk Wars Avengers: Ultimate Heroes.
- Loki appears as an unlockable character in Marvel Avengers Alliance Tactics.
- Loki appears as a playable character in Disney Infinity 2.0, voiced by Troy Baker.
- Loki appears in Disney Infinity 3.0, voiced by Troy Baker.
- Loki appears in Marvel Contest of Champions.
- Loki appears in Marvel: Future Fight.
- Loki appears in Lego Marvel's Avengers, voiced by archival audio of Tom Hiddleston.
- Loki appears in Marvel Mighty Heroes.
- Loki and Lady Loki appear in Marvel Avengers Academy, respectively voiced by Tom Cassel and Elizabeth Futter.
- Loki appears in Marvel Tsum Tsum.
- Loki appears in Lego Marvel Super Heroes 2.
- Loki appears in Pinball FX3.
- Loki appears in Marvel Battle Lines.
- Loki appears in Marvel End Time Arena.
- Loki appears in Marvel Powers United VR, voiced again by Crispin Freeman.
- Loki appears in Marvel Strike Force.
- Loki appears in Marvel Hero Tales.
- Loki appears as a playable character in Marvel Ultimate Alliance 3: The Black Order, voiced by Jason Spisak.
- Loki appears in Marvel Super War.
- Loki appears in Marvel Duel.
- Loki appears as an outfit in Fortnite Battle Royale.
- Loki appears in Marvel Dimension of Heroes, voiced again by Crispin Freeman.
- Loki appears in Marvel Future Revolution, voiced again by Jason Spisak.
- Loki appears in Marvel's Avengers, voiced by Travis Willingham while impersonating Thor. Additionally, an alternate timeline version of Loki appears in "The Mighty Thor" DLC.
- Loki appears as a playable character in Marvel Rivals.
- Loki appears as a playable character in Marvel Tōkon: Fighting Souls voiced by Jason Spisak in English, with Daisuke Hirakawa reprising his role from Marvel Cinematic Universe in Japanese. This version is a member of the Samurai Outriders alongside Ghost Rider, Blade, and Deadpool, and aims to clear his name as a villain to the public and people of Asgard following Thor's disappearance.

=== Miscellaneous ===
- Loki appears in Thor & Loki: Blood Brothers, voiced primarily by David Blair and by Barney Townsend as a child.
- Loki, based on the Marvel Cinematic Universe incarnation, appears in the Marvel Universe: LIVE! stage show.
