= Thor: Son of Asgard =

2004–2005 Marvel comic book series

- Cover to Thor: Son of Asgard: The Warriors Teen trade paperback.

Publication information
- Publisher: Marvel Comics
- Schedule: Monthly
- Format: Ongoing series
- Genre: Superhero
- Publication date: March 2004 – January 2005
- No. of issues: 12
- Main character(s): Thor; Sif; Balder; Loki

Creative team
- Written by: Akira Yoshida
- Artist: Greg Tocchini
- Penciller(s): Greg Tocchini (comic); Adi Granov (cover #1-6); Jo Chen (cover #7-12)
- Inker: Jay Leisten
- Letterer: Randy Gentile
- Colorist: Guru eFX
- Editor(s): Joe Quesada; MacKenzie Cadenhead

Collected editions
- Thor: Son of Asgard: ISBN 978-0-7851-4156-3

Thor: Son of Asgard is a comic book series published by Marvel Comics from March 2004 to January 2005. Written by Akira Yoshida and illustrated by Greg Tocchini, the series follows Thor's early adventures in Asgard with Sif and Balder. It was originally a limited series of six issues but, thanks to popular demand, it was later extended to an ongoing series that lasted for twelve issues in total.

== Plot ==
The series is composed of three storylines: "The Warriors Teen" (issues #1-6), "Enchanted" (issues #7-9), and "Worthy" (issues #10-12).

=== The Warriors Teen ===
In Thor: Son of Asgard #1-6, titled "The Warriors Teen," a teenaged Thor and his friends, Sif and Balder, sneak into the great hall of Asgard and Thor tries to lift Mjolnir, without success. He states that someday, he will be worthy enough to lift it. Three giant spiders enchanted by Loki attack them. Working together, the three young warriors defeat them. After this feat, Odin decides to send them on a quest to find four mystical elements that will then be fashioned into an enchanted blade. The four items are: a scale from the dragon Hakurei; a feather from the snow eagle Gnori; a jewel from a mine of Jennia; and a vial of water from the Lake of Lilitha.

Both the Norn Queen Karnilla and Loki learn of the quest and separately try to stop the trio from completing it. However, when Karnilla captures Loki and attempts to convince him to aid her in overthrowing Odin, he refuses and instead informs Thor, Sif, and Balder of her plan. Sif, Balder, and Loki return to Odin to prepare for Karnilla's attack, while Thor completes the quest.

After the attack, Karnilla kills Thor with an arrow, but he is revived by the healing power of water from the lake and Sif's tears of love. Then Karnilla menaces the life of Loki. Balder offers his life in exchange for Loki's. He explains his action by the value of life and that there is good in every soul. Karnilla flees.

One month after the battle, the enchanted blade is finished. During a banquet, Odin presents the sword Svaden and gives it to Balder for his mercy and compassion.

=== Enchanted ===
In Thor: Son of Asgard #7-9, titled "Enchanted," Sif is the only girl in a class of male warriors until the arrival of Brunnhilda. With this female warrior and Amora, Sif now has now two rivals in the competition for Thor's affections. The two blondes remind her that she lost her golden hair after Loki jealously cut it and replaced it with enchanted black hair made by dwarves. Taking advantage of her vulnerability, Amora and Loki trick Sif into stealing the Mirror of Mycha.

The Mirror of Mycha is an enchanted mirror that, when the proper spell is cast upon it, will cause the person who is looking into it to fall in love with the person holding it. The legend says that only a woman's touch can give life to the mirror.

Loki casts the spell. Amora steals the mirror from Sif and uses it on Thor, and this is later found out to be Amora and Loki's plan to see Thor and Sif fail. Brunnhilda and Sif decide to fight together against the sorcerers. During the fight, Brunnhilda breaks the mirror and the spell over Thor vanishes. Sif has to apologize and explain why she would have tricked him with the Mirror of Mycha. Thor forgives her and they exchange their first kiss.

=== Worthy ===
In Thor: Son of Asgard #10-12, titled "Worthy," Thor, frustrated by his incapacity to wield the hammer Mjolnir, decides to travel to the Norns to learn how to succeed. They tell him that he must first face death. After his return to Asgard, he discovers that the Storm Giants have attacked the city and kidnapped Sif. Odin tells Thor to stay and guard Asgard and he and the gods will go rescue her. Due to his feelings for the young woman, Thor disobeys his father and finds himself worthy to lift Mjolnir.

On his horse Treibold, Thor travels to Jotunheim. He defeats many Storm Giants to face Rugga, their king. Rugga tells him he was offered immortality by the goddess of death, Hela, if he turned Sif over to her. Thor goes to confront Hela. During the confrontation, Hela threatens to kill Sif. However, when Thor offers himself in her place, Hela realizes that he would die an honorable death (thereby spoiling her desire to inflict great sorrow on Odin and the Asgardians), and so sets Sif free.

== Development ==
Originally, the dialogue was supposed to be written in "old world" style as in other Marvel comics with Asgardians; however, Marvel chose finally to use a more modern tone. Akira Yoshida explained, "The first issue was lettered and I had already seen the proofs when my wonderful editor MacKenzie Cadenhead called and said that the general feeling at Marvel seemed to be to make the dialogue more colloquial. She explained that we should tone down the THYs and HATHs and NAYs, so younger comic fans could pick up the book and enjoy it as well without getting turned off by the older-sounding language."

== Collected editions ==
=== Digests ===
- Thor: Son of Asgard, Vol. 1: The Warriors Teen, collects issues #1-6, October 2004, ISBN 978-0-7851-1335-5
- Thor: Son of Asgard, Vol. 2: Worthy, collects issues #7-12, April 2005, ISBN 978-0-7851-1572-4

=== Trade paperbacks ===
- Thor: Son of Asgard, collects issues #1-12, August 2010, ISBN 978-0-7851-4156-3

== Public reception ==
- Thor: Son of Asgard #9 reached the Top 300 list in terms of direct sales estimates in October 2004.
- Thor: Son of Asgard #12 reached the Top 300 list in terms of direct sales estimates in January 2005.
- Thor: Son of Asgard, Vol. 1: The Warriors Teen reached the Top 100 Graphic Novels/TPB's in terms of direct sales estimates in October 2004.

== In other media ==
An animated film titled Thor: Tales of Asgard was released in May 2011.
