= Thor: Vikings =

Comic book limited series

- Cover of the 1st issue

Publication information
- Publisher: Marvel Comics
- Schedule: Monthly
- Format: Limited series
- Genre: Superhero
- Publication date: September 2003 – January 2004
- No. of issues: 5
- Main character(s): Thor, Doctor Strange

Creative team
- Written by: Garth Ennis
- Artist: Glenn Fabry
- Letterer: Dave Sharpe
- Colorist: Paul Mounts
- Editor: Joe Quesada

Collected editions
- Thor: Vikings: ISBN 978-0-7851-1175-7

Thor: Vikings is a 5-issue comic book limited series published by MAX Comics, an imprint of Marvel Comics for adult audiences, in July–November 2003. Written by Garth Ennis and illustrated by Glenn Fabry, the series follows Thor's battle against a group of thousand-year-old undead Vikings who attack New York City.

== Plot synopsis ==
In 1003 AD, along the west coast of Norway, Lord Harald Jaekelsson and his Vikings raid the town of Lakstad. After raping the women and killing nearly all the villagers, they decide to leave for the New World. But the town's wise man, the last survivor, places a curse on them with the help of a runestone. He pleads with the gods that they never reach their destination. Harald takes a bow and shoots the wise man dead, and they sail on. They sail for 1000 years, until they finally land at the South Street Seaport in New York. They are not human any more; they are powerful zombies. They kill everyone they encounter, and are about to rape a woman when Thor shows up.

Harald Jaekelsson recognizes the Avenger as the god of Gods. He beats Thor without difficulty—breaking Thor's arms, tying Mjolnir to him, and tossing him in the Hudson river. His men continue their reign of terror over New York. They create a mountain of severed heads. They fight and defeat policemen and the army. Their Viking ship, magically powered by the spell, can fly in the streets and throw fire. Thor manages to pull himself out of the river; Doctor Strange is waiting for him.

After recovering in Doctor Strange's house, Thor follows Strange into a room where a mystic river runs "somewhere time flows by like a river and may be observed as such." This allows the sorcerer to look at the past, seeking answers. There, they discover how Harald and his crew came to be so powerful: the death of the town wise man provided too much blood for the spell. They determine that to stop Harald and his Vikings, they need descendants of his bloodline. They look through time and select three mighty warriors and bring them forward to help: Sigrid, a Viking battle maiden; Magnus of the Danes, a Teutonic knight; and Erik Loonroth, a Luftwaffe Messerschmitt pilot in the Second World War. Meanwhile, the Avengers—Captain America, Iron Man, Vision, the Scarlet Witch, and Hawkeye—have been defeated and need medical assistance. More Marines are sent to fight against Harald and his men.

A helicopter flies over the city and discovers the heads of the Marines on pikes in the street. Doctor Strange and Thor ask Harald Jaekelsson's descendants to fight with them. They are all ready to fight for a noble cause, especially Erik. Doctor Strange uses their blood to empower a spell to make them as strong as the undead Vikings, and they go to fight Harald, who is now situated in a bone throne at the top of the Empire State Building. The heroes defy Harald, and the Messerschmitt attacks the flying Viking ship.

The heroes stage an assault on Harald Jaekelsson's forces, with Erik in the air and the others fighting on the ground. Harald stabs Thor through the back, knocks out Sigrid, and wounds Magnus, but Thor retaliates. The Vikings jump onto Erik's airplane; the pilot safely bails out and lets the plane crash into the Viking ship, destroying them both. All Harald's dead Vikings are destroyed. Out of respect, Sigrid, Magnus and Erik allow Thor to finish Harald alone. Thor, punching Harald, sends him directly off into space. Finally, the three warriors return to the times of their own wars. When they disappear, Thor says: "I will see thou in Valhalla."

== Collected editions ==
The trade paperback Thor: Vikings collecting #1-5 was published in February 2004 (ISBN 9780785111757)

== Reception ==
Each comic of the series Thor: Vikings was in the 70 first places of the Top 300 Comics in terms of sales for each comic in 2003.

The trade paperback Thor: Vikings reached 5th place in the Top 50 Graphic Novels/TPB's in terms of sales in February 2004.
