= Vote Loki =

2016 Marvel comic book series

- Vote Loki #1 (June, 2016). Cover art by Langdon Foss.

Publication information
- Publisher: Marvel Comics
- Genre: Superhero
- Publication date: June – September 2016
- No. of issues: 4
- Main character(s): Loki; Nisa Contreras

Creative team
- Artist(s): Langdon Foss (Issues #1, #3–4); Paul McCaffrey (Issue #2)
- Letterer: Travis Lanham
- Colorist(s): Chris Chuckry (Issues #1–2, #4); Rachelle Rosenberg (Issue #3)

Collected editions
- Vote Loki: ISBN 978-1-302-90262-9

Vote Loki is a four-part comic book series published by Marvel Comics from June 2016 to August 2016 as a satire about the 2016 United States presidential election. Written by comic book creator Christopher Hastings, the series is centered around Loki's controversial political campaign for President of the United States and reporter Nisa Contreras's attempt to prove his duplicity.

The compiled edition of all four issues also includes the Loki stories from Journey into Mystery issue #85 (1962), and from Avengers issue #300 (1989), re-telling Loki's comics role in creating the Avengers.

== Plot ==
Nisa Contreras, a Daily Bugle journalist, visits the "Kramco Stadium" for the presidential debate. While talking with another reporter "Lucas", who works for BuzzFeed, Nisa notices that many reporters have identification badges that look different from her own. Just as she comes to said realization, it is revealed that the suspicious reporters are actually armed Hydra agents. Lucas reveals himself to be Loki in disguise and stops all of the criminals, and announces his own candidacy.

While Loki is on a talk show, Nisa calls in, revealing her mistrust of Loki and stating that she believes he is only seeking power for its own sake. Nisa writes a scathing article about the god of lies and sends it to her editor, only to find in the morning that Loki has convinced him to change the title from "Loki will burn Washington" to "Loki's Campaign Something to get Excited About".

Mighty Thor slips Nisa a clue about one of Loki's main funders, the "America the Faithful Fund". Nisa walks into the "America the Faithful Fund" building, and stumbles upon a group of people performing some sort of ceremony on a goat while wearing costumes similar to Loki's. As they unmask themselves after the unsuccessful ritual, Nisa catches the worshipers on camera. Loki spins the situation around, not only acknowledging but accepting the fact that he has worshipers because of his being a god, and inviting the American people to join his cult.

Loki involves himself in the political situation of Latveria, a small country whose former leader, Doctor Doom, has disappeared. While the two other candidates agree that the U.S.A. should send troops to Latveria, Loki says he would prefer a peaceful and diplomatic solution.

Nisa purchases a ticket to Latveria and infiltrates a revolutionary group called the Latverian New Prosperity Alliance. After they sneak into Doom's castle, they attempt to open a weapon cache door, but before they can escape with their weapons, they are stopped by Doom's Children. An unidentified person from the Latverian New Prosperity Alliance creates an explosion, killing both groups. Nisa, who has been filming the whole incident, discovers that the unidentified person was Loki. When Nisa returns from Latveria, it is revealed that Loki is now even more popular than ever before.

The day before the election, Loki appears at Nisa's door, claiming that the chaos that he caused by running was not what he had wanted. He offers to talk to America to stop all the violence, promising not to lie. Nisa tells Loki to instead talk to his supporters. Accepting this, he starts taking questions from the audience, but as he goes on, it is clear that his supporters believe him less and less. By the day of the election, it is revealed that Loki will most likely not win.

== Reception ==
Vote Loki has received positive reviews from critics. According to review aggregator Comic Book Roundup, the first issue received an average rating of 6.7 out of 10 and the series as a whole scored 7.9 out of 10. CriticalWrit.com called it "brilliant". Heroesdirect gave the first issue a rating of 7.0, calling it "disappointing", however the next three issues received ratings of 8.0, 8.0, and 8.6 respectively.

The first issue sold an estimated 29,500 copies.

== In other media ==
- Vote Loki serves as inspiration for a variant of Loki called President Loki, who appears in the Loki episode "Journey into Mystery", portrayed by Tom Hiddleston.
- Vote Loki serves as inspiration for Loki's "Presidential Attire" skin in Marvel Rivals.
