= Thor (Marvel Comics) =

Marvel Comics character

Thor Odinson
- Thor taken from the variant cover of The Mighty Thor #16 (February 2017). Originally drawn by Sal Buscema for the corner box of the first volume of the comic book series (1966 - 1996) and painted over by Joe Jusko.

Publication information
- Publisher: Marvel Comics
- First appearance: Journey into Mystery #83 (August 1962)
- Created by: Stan Lee (writer/plotter); Larry Lieber (writer/scripter); Jack Kirby (artist)

In-story information
- Full name: Thor Odinson
- Species: Asgardian
- Place of origin: Asgard
- Team affiliations: Avengers
- Partnerships: Sif; Warriors Three; Balder the Brave; Jane Foster; Captain America; Iron Man; Beta Ray Bill; Hercules
- Notable aliases: Donald Blake; Jake Olson; Eric Masterson
- Abilities: Superhuman strength, speed, stamina, agility, durability, reflexes, healing, and longevity; Weather manipulation; Master hand-to-hand combatant; Weapon Mjolnir, with following properties: Near-indestructible and returns to Thor's hand when thrown; Flight; Energy Projection; Dimensional travel

Thor Odinson is a superhero appearing in American comic books published by Marvel Comics, based on the Germanic god of the same name. Created by artist Jack Kirby, writer Stan Lee, and scripter Larry Lieber, the character first appeared in Journey into Mystery #83 (1962) and first received his own title with Thor #126 (1966). Comic books featuring Thor have been published across several volumes.

Thor is one of the gods of Asgard and the son of the Asgardian king Odin. In addition to his Asgardian strength and extended lifespan, Thor wields control over the weather, including rain and lightning. He also carries the enchanted hammer Mjolnir, that enhances his abilities and grants him the ability to fly. Thor was first introduced as the alter ego of surgeon Donald Blake, who acquired Thor's power, which was later revealed to be a fabrication by Thor's father. Thor has since assumed other human identities and sometimes ruled as king of Asgard.

Thor's cast of supporting characters includes his fellow Asgardians Odin, Sif, The Warriors Three, and Balder the Brave, as well as other allies such as Jane Foster, Beta Ray Bill, and Hercules. Thor's arch-nemesis is his adoptive brother Loki. Thor is a founding member of the superhero team the Avengers, and has played a significant role in Marvel crossover storylines, including "Avengers Disassembled" (2004), Siege (2010), "Fear Itself" (2011) and "The War of the Realms" (2019).

Eric Allan Kramer played Thor in the film The Incredible Hulk Returns (1988), while Chris Hemsworth portrays the cinematic adaptation of Thor in the Marvel Cinematic Universe, first appearing in Thor (2011).

== Publication history ==
=== Creation and premiere ===
Thor was created by Stan Lee, Jack Kirby, and Larry Lieber. After initially drafting the character, Lee gave the project to his brother Lieber to write the stories. Kirby developed Thor's visual design, and he had an interest in ancient mythology that lent itself to the character's creation and design. Bulfinch's Mythology was used as a reference during Thor's creation. As superhero comics became more popular, Marvel began replacing its previous comic book lines with superheroes. Thor first appeared in Journey into Mystery #83 (1962). Like other superheroes created at the time, Thor usurped a comic book anthology that had previously been dedicated to monster fiction. Thor arose from Lee's desire to create a superhero who was more powerful than Hulk or the Fantastic Four. Lee in 2002 described Thor's genesis early in the Marvel pantheon, following the creation of the Hulk:

[H]ow do you make someone stronger than the strongest person? It finally came to me: Don't make him human — make him a god. I decided readers were already pretty familiar with the Greek and Roman gods. It might be fun to delve into the old Norse legends... Besides, I pictured Norse gods looking like Vikings of old, with the flowing beards, horned helmets, and battle clubs. ...Journey into Mystery needed a shot in the arm, so I picked Thor ... to headline the book. After writing an outline depicting the story and the characters I had in mind, I asked my brother, Larry, to write the script because I didn't have time. ...and it was only natural for me to assign the penciling to Jack Kirby...

The idea for adapting Thor as a superhero was first developed when Lee and Kirby heard of Marvel being discussed as "twentieth-century mythology". Thor was well-suited to be recreated as a superhero, as the mythological character already had an established supporting cast, superpowers, and sense of justice. At the time Thor was created, there were approximately 15 million Scandinavian Americans, and the United States had a general cultural awareness of historical Scandinavian culture through ideas of Vikings and Leif Erikson. A previous adaptation of Thor had first appeared in Venus #11 (November 1950), published by what is now Marvel Comics. Kirby had previously adapted Thor for DC Comics in Adventure Comics #75 (1942), Boy Commandos #7 (1944), Tales of the Unexpected #16 (1957).

=== 1960s ===
Shortly after Thor premiered, Lieber moved on to other projects, and Thor was given to other writers. Various artists worked on Thor in his first issues, including Don Heck and Joe Sinnott. Lee soon took over writing duties for several Marvel superhero titles, as the writers did not meet his expectations, and he became the writer for Thor beginning in Journey into Mystery #97 (1963). Kirby became the artist shortly afterward, beginning in Journey into Mystery #101 (1964).

When Marvel's distributor allowed them more monthly releases, The Avengers was developed as a new comic book series. Thor was included as an inaugural member of the titular superhero team. By 1965, the difficulty of maintaining continuity between The Avengers and the titles of the individual characters prompted Lee to write the original cast out of The Avengers, including Thor.

Lee created a second series that centered on Norse mythology, "Tales of Asgard". First appearing in Journey into Mystery #97 (1963), this series focused on Thor's mythological adventures and greatly expanded his roster of supporting characters, including Sif, Balder the Brave, and the Warriors Three. Journey into Mystery was eventually renamed to Thor, beginning with Thor #126 (1966). This marked a significant shift in Thor's characterization: the primary setting was moved from Earth to Asgard, Thor's love interest Jane Foster was written out of the story in favor of Sif, and Hercules became a major character. "Tales of Asgard" continued until Thor #145 (1967). The character's backstory was changed in Thor #159 (1968), when it was revealed that Thor was the actual mythological Thor rather than a mortal who obtained Thor's power and that his secret identity of Donald Blake was a fabrication created by Odin to teach him humility. As Kirby's work on Thor came to an end, the setting shifted back to Earth and Jane Foster was reintroduced.

=== 1970s–1990s ===
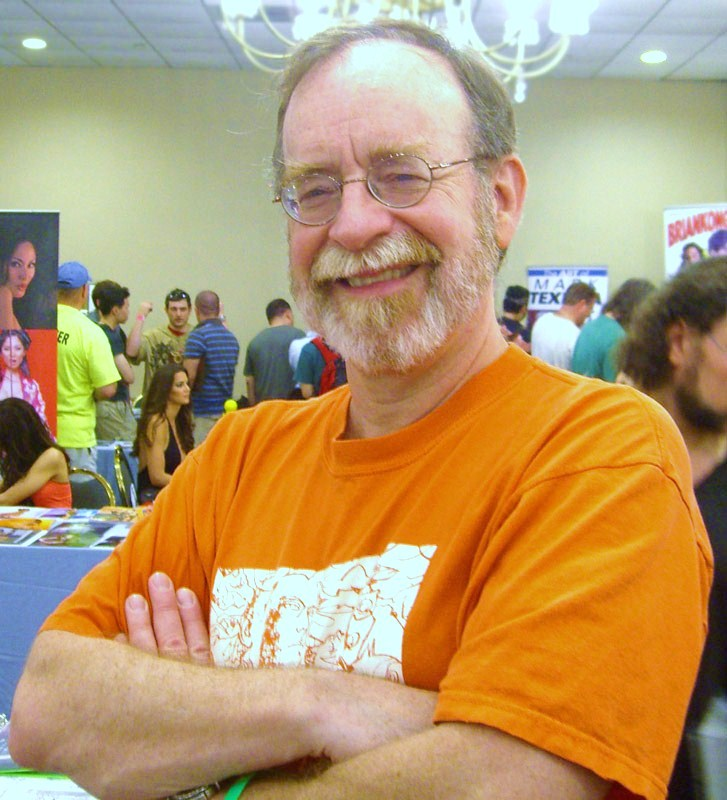
Walter Simonson wrote a celebrated run of Thor in the 1980s.

Kirby stayed on as Thor's artist until Thor #179 (1970). Lee eventually ceded control of the titles he worked on to other writers, and Thor was given to Gerry Conway, who at the time was a teenager. John and Sal Buscema were the artists for this run. After Conway gave up the series, editor Len Wein took over as its writer. After returning to the Avengers, Thor was again removed in Avengers #151 (1976) because writer Steve Englehart believed that Thor was too powerful for the group. Fan backlash ensued, and the subsequent writer, Jim Shooter, returned him to the team in Avengers #159 (1977).

In the mid-1970s, Marvel considered giving the character a second series as part of parent company Magazine Management's line of black-and-white comics magazines. A story written by Steve Englehart for the aborted project appeared in Thor Annual #5 (1976).

Doug Moench wrote for Thor from 1981 to 1983. This run was poorly received, which Moench argued was due to the limitations imposed by editor Mark Gruenwald. Walter Simonson subsequently took over the series, revitalizing it and increasing sales. Simonson's run was highly regarded by critics, and it included several major milestones in Thor's history, including "The Surtur Saga", "Skurge's Last Stand", "Mjolnir's Song", and "The Ballad of Beta Ray Bill". His introduction of Beta Ray Bill shifted the dynamic of Thor introducing a second character who Odin recognized as worthy of Thor's power. In the 1990s, Marvel briefly supplemented its main superheroes with more violent anti-hero versions. During this time, Thor was replaced with Eric Masterson.

During the Heroes Reborn event, many of Marvel's superheroes were given new volumes, restarted at issue #1, but Thor's series was not renewed. A new volume of Thor instead launched during the subsequent Heroes Return event. This volume was written by Dan Jurgens and illustrated by John Romita Jr. To humanize Thor, he was again bound to a mortal, this time giving him the alter-ego of paramedic Jake Olson.

=== 21st century ===
The subsequent period of Marvel's history reflected the political turmoil that followed the September 11 attacks and the war on terror. For Thor, this involved becoming the king of Asgard, giving him political power that he abused. An alternate version of the Avengers, the Ultimates, debuted in 2002 as part of the Ultimate Marvel branding that re-imagined Marvel characters in an alternative universe. This universe's version of Thor has the same powers, but he is a pacifist and it is left unclear whether he is truly a god or mentally unstable.

Thor volume two ended with a tie in to the Avengers Disassembled storyline that saw major changes to Marvel's main characters. Issues #80–85 (2004) follow the events of Ragnarök as the story's primary setting, Asgard, is destroyed. This story arc was written by Michael Avon Oeming and illustrated by Andrea Di Vito. A third volume of Thor began publication in 2007, written by J. Michael Straczynski and illustrated by Olivier Coipel. This volume began by addressing the ramifications of Avengers Disassembled and slowly reintroducing Thor's supporting characters. Thor was then a central character in the Siege event in 2010, which featured Marvel's cast of superheroes defending Asgard from Norman Osborn. The Ultimate Universe version of Thor received a four-issue miniseries, Ultimate Thor, in 2010.

To coincide with the Thor film, Marvel launched a number of new series starring the character in mid-2010. These included Thor: The Mighty Avenger by Roger Langridge and Chris Samnee, Thor: First Thunder by Bryan J. L. Glass and Tan Eng Huat, Thor: For Asgard by Robert Rodi and Simone Bianchi, and Iron Man/Thor by the writing duo of Dan Abnett and Andy Lanning. The limited series Thor: The Mighty Avenger was published across eight issues from 2010 to 2011, following Thor in his earlier years as a less serious, family friendly interpretation of the character. This series was written by Roger Langridge and illustrated by Chris Samnee, and was met with critical praise. It was followed by a new The Mighty Thor series in 2011, written by Matt Fraction and illustrated by Olivier Coipel. Thor also appeared in the "Fear Itself" event and was a main character of the Fear Itself miniseries in 2011.

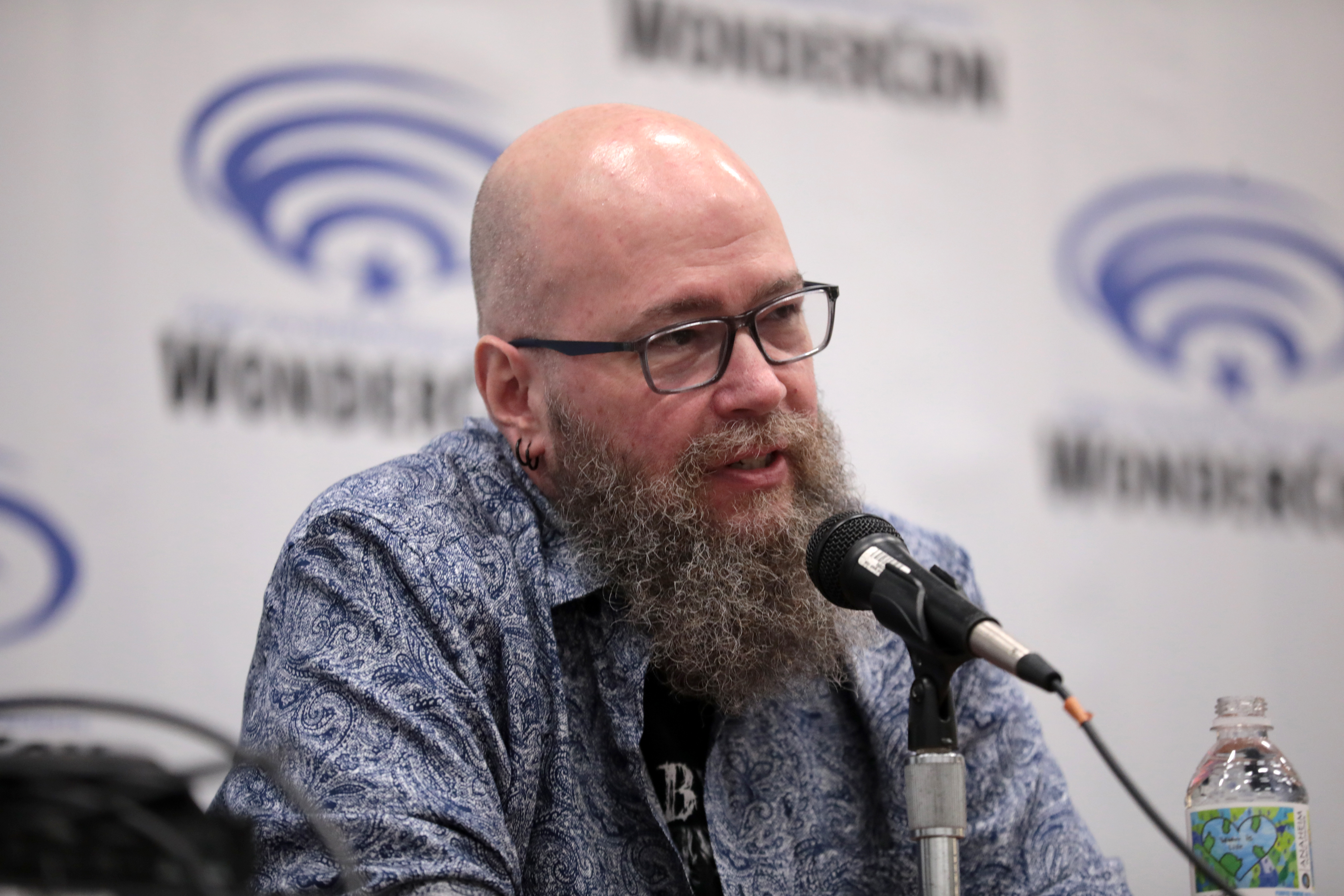
Jason Aaron was an influential writer for Thor in the 2010s.

The next Thor series, Thor: God of Thunder, began publication in 2012 during the Marvel Now! relaunch. This run was written by Jason Aaron and illustrated by Esad Ribic. The first eleven issues followed Thor, accompanied by an elderly Thor from the future and a young Thor from the past, battling Gorr the God Butcher. In the 2010s, Marvel began substituting its main characters with a new diverse cast of characters. Thor was replaced by Jane Foster as part of this trend during the 2014 Original Sin story arc, and she became the main character in the Thor franchise. The original Thor was called The Odinson during this period, and he starred in a separate series, The Unworthy Thor, written by Aaron and illustrated by Olivier Coipel. Thor was relaunched with Marvel's Fresh Start branding, still written by Aaron, restoring The Odinson as Thor and leading up to "The War of the Realms" (2019).

A new volume of Thor began publication in 2020, written by Donny Cates and illustrated by Nic Klein, which follows Thor as the ruler of Asgard. The next series, The Immortal Thor, premiered in 2023.

== Characterization ==
=== Fictional character biography ===
Journey into Mystery #83 (Aug. 1962), the debut of Thor. Cover art by Jack Kirby and Joe Sinnott.

Thor was born to Odin, the king of Asgard, and Gaea, the Earth goddess. He was then raised by Odin's wife, Frigga, believing her to be his mother. As Thor comes of age, Odin gifts him a magic hammer, Mjolnir, which is enchanted so that only the worthy may lift it. Thor had existed in a past form more reminiscent of the mythological Thor, but he was eventually reincarnated as a new version. In the past, Thor fought alongside the Vikings, but he condemned them after an attack on a Christian monastery.

Deeming him too arrogant, Odin banishes Thor to modern day Earth with no memory of his Asgardian origins, giving him the identity of Donald Blake. As Blake, Thor visits Scandinavia where he stumbles upon a walking stick, which he discovers can turn into Mjolnir and give him the powers of Thor. In a plot to defeat Thor, Loki provokes the Hulk into attacking a train. While Loki is successful in luring Thor out, he is accompanied by Iron Man, Ant-Man, and Wasp. After defeating Loki, the heroes come together as a superhero team, forming the Avengers. Odin eventually restores Thor as an Asgardian, revealing that Blake was a persona that he had invented for Thor. When Thor is defeated by Beta Ray Bill, Odin transfers the ability to transform into Blake from Thor to Beta Ray Bill. To continue living among mortals, Thor takes the name Sigurd Jarlson and becomes a construction worker. Odin later binds Thor to the mortal Eric Masterson to save Masterson's life. Thor is exiled for seemingly killing Loki, but Masterson retains the powers of Thor and becomes the superhero Thunderstrike.

During the 1996 "Onslaught" storyline, Thor is one of the heroes who is transported to an alternate dimension by Franklin Richards, but they are soon returned. Thor is again bound to a mortal, this time to Jake Olson, but this connection too is severed. When Odin seemingly dies, Thor becomes the king of Asgard. To cure humanity's ills, he relocates Asgard above Earth and takes control of human affairs to give them clean energy, healthcare, and economic prosperity. The extent of the entanglement and the resulting loss of liberties cause strife within Asgard and resentment from humanity. This leads to military conflict that destroys Asgard and New York City. Such is Thor's hubris that he finds himself unable to lift Mjolnir. He remains steadfast, consolidating his power over Earth for many years before he remorsefully goes back in time to prevent himself from seizing power over Earth.

As Ragnarök begins, Thor learns that the Asgardians undergo an endless cycle of death and rebirth through Ragnarök, enforced by higher beings. To break the cycle, Thor destroys the tapestry of the Three Fates, reincarnating the Asgardians as mortals. In the meantime, a clone of Thor is created by the pro-registration faction during the civil war between superheroes. While in the afterlife, Thor once again binds himself to Blake to resurrect himself, and creates a new Asgard floating over Oklahoma, gathering the Asgardians who had been reincarnated as mortals. When Loki resurrects Thor's grandfather, Bor, Bor goes into a berserker state and Thor is forced to kill him. As Bor was the rightful king of Asgard upon his resurrection, Thor is banished for regicide. While banished, Thor seeks out Sif, who was still lost from the destruction of the Asgardians. After Norman Osborn seizes power in the United States, he orders an attack on the new Asgard, and Thor returns to his home. Though Asgard is destroyed and Loki is killed after coming to Thor's aid, Thor ends the attack and his banishment is commuted. After Thor discovers that Loki has been reborn as a child with no memories, they reunite as brothers.

In the 2011 "Fear Itself" storyline, Odin's brother Cul, who is known as The Serpent, emerges from his imprisonment by Odin, and wages war on Earth. Thor fights and defeats the Serpent, sacrificing his own life. Kid Loki seeks out Blake to resurrect Thor. A revived Thor then faces Gorr the God Butcher and teams with a younger and an older version of himself to defeat Gorr, though Gorr's condemnation of the gods shakes Thor's confidence, and he finds himself unable to lift Mjolnir. The hammer is taken by Thor's ally Jane Foster, who temporarily becomes the new Thor before inspiring his confidence and returning the role to him.

When Malekith the Accursed wages the War of the Realms, Thor's arm is cut off and he sacrifices his eye in exchange for the wisdom to defeat Malekith, and Thor then reunites with his past and future selves as well as Foster's Thor to win the battle.

When Galactus arrives to warn of the Black Winter, the destroyer of the previous multiverse that Galactus was born in, he imbues Thor with the Power Cosmic, which automatically restores Thor's missing arm and eye, and enlists him as a herald, only for Thor to kill both him and the Black Winter for their genocidal crimes.

Thor would later engage in battle against a group of elder gods led by Utgard-Loki and released by Thor's mother Gaea, who wishes to destroy humanity to stop it from systematically destroying Earth's natural environment and animal species. After prevailing against several of his opponents, Thor is assassinated by Loki as a magical blood sacrifice to empower a powerful spell of unknown nature, the Bifrost Bridge to Earth is shattered in the process, and all memories of Thor and the other Asgardians disappear from all people on Earth as a result. Directly after this, Thor's spirit engages in battle with the Jormundgand-possessed Donald Blake. Thor frees Blake's spirit from Jormungand, and reincarnates it as an amnesiac mortal on Earth named Sigurd Jarlson. Jarlson undergoes a first trial against several of Thor's earthly enemies, led by Dario Agger, the CEO of the environment-destroying Roxxon Energy Corporation, and then a second trial against Thor's prophecised doom, the Midgard Serpent. After escaping with help from Loki, Jarlson is sent on his final test that involves a journey into mystery across the other 9 realms of the world tree Yggdrasil, in order to return Thor to life.

=== Personality and themes ===
As with many Marvel superheroes, Thor was created as a flawed character. He is conflicted between his sense of moral purity and his pride, and his father Odin seeks to teach him humility. For his arrogance, he was forced by Odin to live as a mortal, and Thor's experience with humanity provides his character growth.

When Thor was first created, he was an exception to Marvel's real world approach to storytelling, emphasizing the fantastical over current events and modern social issues. As he became more connected to the Marvel Universe, social commentary became more common. Thor was also one of several Marvel characters who underwent physical transformation to explore different aspects of his character, transforming between the mortal Donald Blake and the immortal Thor.

Thor finds himself split between Asgard and Earth, having an established life and loyalty to both. Though he is an Asgardian, he was born to Gaea, the Earth goddess, and he is imbued with an intrinsic connection to Earth. While he is bound to Dr. Blake, Thor holds significant responsibilities in both realms, and he is often forced to choose between his role as a prince and as a surgeon. Writers have intentionally sought to balance Earth-centric and Asgard-centric stories to keep the character interesting.

Thor has a distinct manner of speech, inspired by the King James Version of the Bible and by the work of William Shakespeare. The extent of this style and how it is implemented has changed between writers. Thor's origin as a Norse god has allowed for religious themes to be invoked with the character. He is also reminiscent of the Vikings and invokes positive aspects of their image, but he has rejected the brutality associated with Viking raids.

=== Powers and abilities ===
Cover of Thor vol. 6, #1 (January 2020), showing Thor's updated costume with visible Thurisaz rune. Art by Olivier Coipel.

Thor is one of the gods of Asgard, granting him exceptional strength, durability, and endurance. Though not fully immortal, Asgardians have immense lifespans and are immune to disease. Until Thor ended the Ragnarok cycle, the Asgardians went through an endless series of deaths and reincarnations. Among the Asgardians, Thor is one of the most powerful. He possesses superhuman strength, and centuries of combat have trained him as a proficient warrior. Thor is also educated in human medicine from his experience as Blake, who was a surgeon. Thor eventually becomes fully immortal.

==== Equipment ====
Thor wields an enchanted hammer called Mjölnir which is crafted from the fictional metal uru, making it nearly indestructible. Wielding it improves his natural control over wind, rain, thunder, and lightning and weather. He can use the hammer to fly by throwing it into the air and grabbing the leather strap to pull himself off the ground. The hammer also allows Thor to travel between dimensions, moving him between Earth and Asgard. Mjolnir is enchanted so that it may only be lifted by those who are worthy. Another enchantment causes it to always return to its wielder when thrown. It previously gave Thor the ability to travel through time, but it has since lost this power. When Thor transforms into a human, Mjolnir takes the guise of a walking stick that he can use to transform back into Thor. During these times, being separated from the hammer for sixty seconds reverts him back to his human form.

Besides his hammer, Thor possesses a magic belt that doubles his strength, but it drains him of energy and he uses it only sparingly. He also owns a set of uru armor and a pair of iron gauntlets. When traveling with passengers or cargo as a consideration, Thor uses a chariot pulled by his two magic goats, Toothgnasher and Toothgrinder.

== Supporting characters ==
Thor's supporting cast includes the gods of Asgard: his father is the Asgardian king Odin, he was friends with Balder the Brave since childhood, and the Warriors Three sometimes accompany him. Thor is romantically involved with Sif, a fellow Asgardian. When Thor was banished to Earth as Dr. Blake, he met the nurse Jane Foster. Both Thor and his alter-ego Blake developed an attraction to Foster, creating a love triangle. When Thor returned to Asgard, he reunited with Sif. Thor's relationship with Foster has been the subject of disagreement between Thor and his father. Hercules of the Greek pantheon was initially introduced as a rival to Thor, but the two eventually became allies. Beta Ray Bill became an ally of Thor after proving his worthiness and receiving a hammer of his own from Odin, Stormbreaker. On Earth, Thor is allied with the Avengers, of which he is a founding member.

Thor's nemesis is his adoptive brother Loki. As Thor is the heir to Asgard's throne, Loki envies Thor and engages in plots to seize power over Asgard for himself. Thor regularly fights mythological creatures such as trolls and giants. Besides his supernatural opponents, Thor also fights human groups such as agents of the Soviet Union. Other major villains include Surtur, Enchantress, Executioner, Hela, Malekith the Accursed, Ulik, Mangog, the Destroyer, Serpent, Ymir, Laufey, Fafnir, Perrikus, Gorr the God Butcher, the Midgard Serpent, Kurse, the Wrecking Crew, Ragnarok, and Galactus.

Other characters have taken the title of Thor, including Jane Foster, Beta Ray Bill, Eric Masterson, Volstagg, and Storm. The Marvel Multiverse features many variants of Thor, including Ultimate Thor in the Ultimate Universe, Thor 2099 in Marvel 2099, Throg the Frog of Thunder, and King Thor from the future. Wonder Woman of DC Comics wielded Thor's power after lifting Mjolnir in the 1996 miniseries DC vs. Marvel.

== Reception and legacy ==
According to Martin Arnold, Thor's existence as a comic book superhero has moved the ideas of Norse mythology from high culture to low culture, shifting it away from both its reputation as an academic topic and its association with Nazi iconography. Although the direct applicability of Marvel's Thor to the mythological Thor is limited, Marvel's version of the character is a prominent representation of Norse mythology in popular culture, and represents an entry point for the understanding of Norse folklore in modern times. In this way, the character created a 20th century American audience for Norse myth that expanded significantly when it was adapted to film.

Thor has appeared among the top five in several ranked lists of greatest Avengers characters. Kirby had intended to replace Thor and his cast of characters with a new pantheon of deities; this idea was nixed by Lee, but it eventually became the New Gods and Fourth World stories that Kirby created for DC Comics. Thor influenced the comic book Black Hammer, which features various homages to the character.

== In other media ==
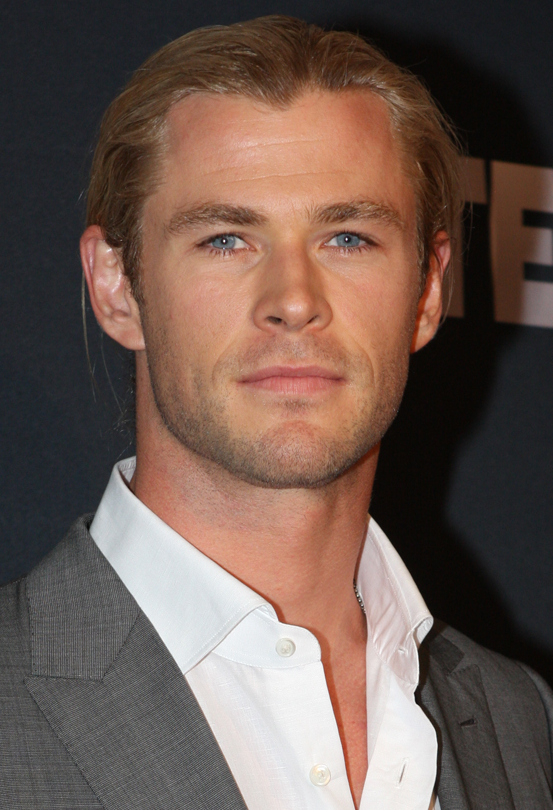
Chris Hemsworth portrays Thor in the Marvel Cinematic Universe (pictured in 2013).

Thor was first adapted in The Marvel Super Heroes, an animated television serial, in 1966. Thor has since appeared in various animated television programs featuring Marvel characters, as a main character in ensemble casts and through guest appearances in other Marvel properties. The character also stars in the animated direct-to-video film Thor: Tales of Asgard.

A live action adaptation of Thor appears in The Incredible Hulk Returns (1988), portrayed by Eric Allan Kramer. This version of Thor was considered for its own spin-off, but this was not seen through due to an ongoing writers strike and concerns about the character's design. A Thor movie was set for production with Universal Pictures in 1981, but it was one of several planned Marvel projects that were not produced. Lee also pitched a Thor film to Fox Studios, but it was not accepted.

Chris Hemsworth portrays an adaptation of Thor in the Marvel Cinematic Universe, appearing in Thor (2011), The Avengers (2012), Thor: The Dark World (2013), Avengers: Age of Ultron (2015), Doctor Strange (2016), Thor: Ragnarok (2017), Avengers: Infinity War (2018), Avengers: Endgame (2019), and Thor: Love and Thunder (2022). This version of Thor was introduced as a member of a technologically advanced alien race, placing less emphasis on the character's fantasy origins. Hemsworth also portrayed Thor in the animated series What If...? and in the Team Thor short films.

Thor is featured in two video games: Thor: God of Thunder and Thor: Son of Asgard. He also appears in several other video games that feature rosters of Marvel characters.

== Collected editions ==
- Journey into Mystery
- Various titles of Thor
- Thor: Son of Asgard
- Thor: Vikings
