= Midgard Serpent (Marvel Comics) =

Fictional character

The Midgard Serpent
- The Midgard Serpent and Thor as depicted in Thor #380 (June 1987). Art by Walt Simonson.

Publication information
- Publisher: Marvel Comics
- First appearance: Marvel Tales #105 (February 1952)
- Created by: Stan Lee (writer); Jack Kirby (artist)

In-story information
- Full name: Jormungand
- Place of origin: Earth
- Notable aliases: The World Serpent, Fin Fang Foom
- Abilities: Extreme strength and stamina Fire and venom generation Illusion projection

Jormungand, also known as the Midgard Serpent and the World Serpent, is a character appearing in American comic books published by Marvel Comics. The character, based on the serpent Jörmungandr from Norse mythology, first appears in Marvel Tales #105 (Feb. 1952), in the period between the Golden Age of Comic Books and the Silver Age of Comic Books.

== Publication history ==
The Midgard Serpent debuted in Marvel Tales #105 (February 1952) and was later tied firmly to Marvel continuity in the Silver Age of Comic Books in Thor #127 (April 1966). As in Norse mythology, the Marvel version of the Midgard Serpent is the nemesis of the Thunder God, who has two encounters with the creature – the events based directly on mythology – in Thor #272-273 (June–July 1978).

An attempt to cheat the fatal prophecy made regarding a final battle between Thor and the Serpent occurred in Thor #274-278 (July–December 1978), although the creature returned in Thor #325 (November 1982-January 1983). A "larger than life" battle between Thor and the Serpent was depicted in Thor #379-380 (May–June 1987), with writer-artist Walter Simonson using a splash page to depict the creature's size, and then full pages to demonstrate the battle between the pair.

Although killed, the Serpent was resurrected in Thor #486-488 (May–July 1995), and featured in The Avengers vol. 3 #1 (February 1998) before reappearing in Thor vol. 2 #80 (August 2004).

== Fictional character biography ==
The Midgard Serpent first appears when a scientist draws what he believes to be venom from a statue of the creature, the liquid becoming a deadly solvent.

In the realm of Asgard, the seer Volla makes a prophecy that Thor will battle the Midgard Serpent during Ragnarök after it surfaces from the ocean. He will succeed in killing it, but die from its venom immediately afterwards.

Thor has two encounters with the creature that reflect the Norse myths. The first is a visit to the castle of the Storm Giant Utgard-Loki, who excels in the use of illusions. Challenging Thor to lift his pet "cat", who in reality is the Midgard Serpent, Utgard-Loki is terrified when Thor lifts all but one of the cat's feet off the ground. The second encounter occurs when Thor decides to cheat fate and kill the creature. Taking a fishing boat with the giant Hymir, Thor uses the head of an ox on a chain to draw the Midgard Serpent to the surface of the ocean. Although the creature takes the bait, Thor is unable to deliver the killing blow as Hymir cuts the chain.

Being aware of the prophecy regarding his son's death, Asgard's king Odin cheats fate during a false Ragnarok by replacing Thor with a surrogate known as Red Norvell, who, after gaining the power of Thor and his hammer, dies battling the Midgard Serpent. The Midgard Serpent reappears briefly when a group of Odin's enemies feed the Golden Apples of Idunn, intended for the Norse gods, to the creature, intending to weaken the gods before an attack. It is used as a bridge by Tyr and Loki's army. Thor imprisons the creature and forces it to return the apples.

The character appears on Earth disguised as the monster Fin Fang Foom after a group of giants summon him using one of them as bait on a giant fishing rod. After the deception is revealed, the Midgard Serpent battles Thor to the death. He attacks Thor in a park still disguised as Fin Fang Foom, but does not recognize Thor, who is wearing his Asgardian armor. After apologizing and talking to Thor, Fin Fang Foom says if Thor can lift his big toe, he will battle the "super hero" (Thor) away from the city. Thor is able to lift his big toe and rides him away from the city. When he realizes he does not know his foe's name, Thor tells him. The presence of the Midgard Serpent on Earth causes time to stop for everything except the two opponents and other mythic creatures. Although Thor finally kills the creature, his body is pulped, suffering from a curse on him placed by Hela: his bones become as brittle as glass, but he is unable to heal or die. Thor "resurrects" himself by forcing Hela to recreate his body and free him from her curse.

The Midgard Serpent is released from Hel (the Norse land of the dead) by the Asgardian warrior Kurse to use against Thor, who is swallowed by the creature. Together with ally Beta Ray Bill, Thor blasts free of the Serpent's stomach and kills it a second time.

The Midgard Serpent is apparently resurrected by Morgan le Fay, who summons it to Earth to distract the superhero team the Avengers while she abducts the Scarlet Witch. The Midgard Serpent briefly reappears during Ragnarök.

During the Secret Wars storyline, King Loki, an alternate timeline version of Loki, frees the Midgard Serpent from Hel to attack Asgard.

In Thor (vol. 6), Donald Blake kills the Midgard Serpent, steals its power, and combines it with the Odinforce to transform into a Serpent hybrid. It is later revealed that the Midgard Serpent had been inhabiting Blake's body and that Sigurd Jarlson is Blake's reincarnation.

== Powers and abilities ==
The Midgard Serpent normally exists in an ethereal form around Earth. A huge serpent, the character has immense strength and stamina, can generate both lethal fire and venom, and project powerful illusions. He can cause earthquakes by flexing his coils around Earth.

== In other media ==
=== Television ===
- The Midgard Serpent makes a cameo appearance in The Avengers: Earth's Mightiest Heroes episode "A Day Unlike Any Other".
- The Midgard Serpent appears in Avengers Assemble. This version possesses the ability to continuously grow in size and can be controlled using a special axe created by Ulik.

=== Video games ===
- A clone of the Midgard Serpent created by Malekith appears in Thor: Son of Asgard.
- The Midgard Serpent appears in the Thor table for Pinball FX 2.
