= Asgardians (Marvel Comics) =

Race of gods in Marvel Comics

Publication information
- Publisher: Marvel Comics

Characteristics
- Place of origin: Asgard
- Pantheon: Norse
- Notable members: Thor; Loki; Amora; Odin

The Asgardians or Gods of Asgard are a fictional humanoid race of gods appearing in American comic books published by Marvel Comics. Some are taken from mythology while others are original creations.

== Fictional history ==
They were worshipped about a millennium ago by the Norsemen of Scandinavia and various Germanic tribes, but they no longer have, or seek to have, any worshippers on Earth.

The gods live in a dimension called Asgard which is also home to five other races (Giants, Dwarves, Elves, Trolls, and Demons).

== Known members ==
Known Æsir include Amora the Enchantress, Balder, Bor, Búri, Brunnhilde, Fandral, Frigga, Heimdall, Hermod, Hildegarde, Hoder, Kelda, Lorelei, Magni, Mimir, Odin, Sif, Skurge the Executioner, Thor, Tyr, Vidar, Vili, Ve, Volla, and Volstagg. Known Vanir include Frey, Freya, Idunn, Njord, and Sigyn.

== Powers and abilities ==
Despite their mostly human appearance, all Asgardians possess physical attributes that operate on superhuman levels. All Asgardians possess some degree of superhuman strength, with males typically being stronger than females.

The Asgardians are extremely long lived and age at an extremely slow pace as compared to human beings, unlike the Olympians who cease to age once reaching adulthood. The bodies of the Asgardians possess some degree of superhuman durability. If an Asgardian is injured, he or she will be able to recover much faster than humans. However, they sometimes require magical aids in order to heal themselves from severe injuries, such as missing limbs, organs, and severe blood loss. Often, even with the help of magic, regenerating limbs or organs is beyond their capacity. Only the most physically or mystically gifted Asgardians have the potential to heal from such severe injuries.

The muscle, bone, and skin tissue of an Asgardian is considerably denser than that of a human being. This contributes to the Asgardians superior strength and weight. Due to their superior metabolism, Asgardians also possess superhuman levels of stamina in all physical activities.

All Asgardians are born with the potential to wield and control mystical energies for a variety of purposes, although only a certain few have been observed to have developed this ability to any noticeable degree.

Asgardians are not true immortals. They do age, albeit slowly, but are immune to all known Earthly diseases. Each Asgardian needs, and is allocated, a golden apple grown by Yggdrasil and tended by Idunn. Eating their own apple is essential for an Asgardian to maintain his or her physical vitality.

If an Asgardian dies, his or her place in a type of afterlife is determined by the circumstances of their death. If an Asgardian has died in battle, the Valkyrior will take his or her soul to Valhalla, Odin's palace, where they shall spend eternity feasting and fighting. The souls of Asgardians that haven't died in battle are taken to the realm of Hela, the Asgardian Goddess of Death.

There has been some contradiction regarding the origin of the Asgardians. Main Marvel canon states that the Asgardians are descendants of the Elder Gods, as are all other pantheons on Earth.

== Reception ==
- In 2022, CBR.com ranked Asgardians 2nd in their "The Avengers' 10 Best Allies In Marvel Comics" list.

== Other versions ==
Some comics set in alternate universes have claimed that they are not Gods. Rather, they are aliens whose science and abilities are advanced so far beyond the science and abilities of humans that the Asgardians appear to be magic, such as in "Earth X" where the Asgardians turned out to be the final evolution of manipulation by the Celestials.

== Other media ==
Asgardians have appeared in films set in the Marvel Cinematic Universe, with Thor appearing in several films in the series. Tom Hiddleston portrays Loki in the films Thor, The Avengers, Thor: The Dark World, Thor: Ragnarok and the two-part Avengers: Infinity War.

The 2011 film Thor and the 2013 film Thor: The Dark World featured many unnamed Asgardians. Those films and other films in the series have featured Odin, Sif, Frigga, Heimdall, Volstagg, Fandral, and Hogun.

== See also ==
- Asgard (Marvel Comics)
