= Magni (character) =

Publication information
- Publisher: Marvel Comics
- First appearance: Thor (vol. 2) #68 (September 2003)
- Created by: Dan Jurgens

In-story information
- Alter ego: Magni Thorson
- Species: Asgardian
- Notable aliases: God of strength
- Abilities: Superhuman strength, speed, stamina, reflexes, durability and longevity; Immunity to all Earthly diseases

Magni is a fictional character appearing in American comic books published by Marvel Comics. The character was adapted from Magni, a character in Norse mythology, by Dan Jurgens. Magni exists in an alternate future in which Thor rules over the entire Earth and is the son of Thor and Amora the Enchantress.

== Publication history ==
Magni Thorson debuted in Thor (vol. 2) #68 (September 2003) and was created by Dan Jurgens. The character is based on the Norse mythology deity Magni.

== Fictional character biography ==
=== Thor: The Reigning ===
Magni was born in an alternate future to Thor Odinson and Amora the Enchantress, rulers of Asgard. When he was an infant, Magni's life is threatened by Balder's betrayal during the human resistance's raid led by Captain America. While Thor battles the resistance, Balder captures Magni and threatens to kill him if Thor does not stop his subjugation of humanity. Magni's adoptive uncle Loki saves his life by killing Balder. Thor, no longer restrained by fear for his son's life, kills the remaining intruders himself.

As an adult, Magni joins the Warriors Three and Thialfi on a mission to quell a rebellion. Magni is shocked when the Warriors Three brutally kill humans without trying to find a peaceful solution. Magni returns to the palace, where he learns of Thialfi and Kya's failed assassination attempt on Thor. He tries to prevent Kya's execution, but she telepathically tells him not to. After Kya is killed, her soul leads Magni to Mjolnir. Magni proves to be worthy of wielding Mjolnir and returns to Asgard, intending to test Thor's purity of heart. Magni challenges Thor to lift Mjolnir, but Thor stalls aware that his murder of Jake Olson over 150 years earlier had rendered him unworthy.

While Magni and Thor argue, Desak the god-slayer returns. After a pitched battle in which Magni is critically injured, Thor finds himself able to lift Mjolnir again thanks to his pure intentions to defend his family and undo the wrongs Loki had done. Thor kills Desak, then travels back in time to warn his younger self and ensure that the future he had experienced would never come about. Magni, along with everything after that branching point, ceases to exist.

=== Brought to Earth-616 ===
Enchantress tricks Thor and Ullr in helping her in a ritual. While it appeared to be a ritual that would revive her son Iric, it actually brings Magni to Earth-616. Magni accompanies Thor, Sif, and Enchantress in fighting Radioactive Man, King Cobra, Mister Hyde, and Grey Gargoyle. While Magni knocks Mister Hyde, a later dose of his serum enables Hyde to punch Magni off a roof. Thor has the Asgardians evacuated so that Magni can be healed.

Following Thor's death, Magni takes the throne of Asgard. However, he is cursed by the Enchantress and Ullr, causing him to be locked in Asgard's throne room and only able to rule remotely. After Magni dies, the Enchantress succeeds him, declaring herself the All-Mother.

== Powers and abilities ==
Magni was an Asgardian whose incredibly dense body granted him a high resistance to injury. His Asgardian physiology granted him great stamina, quick reflexes, an extremely long life span, and immunity to all Earthly diseases, toxins, and some magic. Magni's position as the Norse god of strength granted him superhuman strength even greater than that of his father Thor.

As prince of New Asgard and a warrior in its service, Magni received training in the Asgardian arts of war granting him a high degree of proficiency in armed and unarmed combat.

After gaining Mjolnir, Magni received a portion of Thor's powers.

=== Weapons and equipment ===
Magni wore a suit of Asgardian armor similar to the one his father Thor wore during his early days as lord of Asgard. Magni occasionally used one of New Asgard's many winged horses for transportation.

Magni gained possession of his father's legendary hammer Mjolnir, which had several enchantments. Magni demonstrated the ability to throw the hammer and have it magically return to him, fly by throwing it and holding onto its leather thong, and create dimensional portals. Upon gaining Mjolnir, Magni discovered that he instinctively knew how to use it for basic things. Sif instructed him on how to traverse dimensions with it. Still, his proficiency with the hammer may be assumed to be far less than his father's.

Before gaining Mjolnir, Magni favored various types of axes in combat.
