= Asgardians of the Galaxy =

Comic book superheroes

- Promotional art for Asgardians of the Galaxy by Matteo Lolli

Group publication information
- Publisher: Marvel Comics
- First appearance: Asgardians of the Galaxy #1 (September 2018)
- Created by: Cullen Bunn; Matteo Lolli

In-story information
- Member(s): Angela; Valkyrie; Thunderstrike; Throg; Skurge; Destroyer

Asgardians of the Galaxy

Series publication information
- Format: Ongoing series
- Number of issues: 10
- Creator(s): Cullen Bunn; Matteo Lolli

The Asgardians of the Galaxy are a team of superheroes that appear in American comic books published by Marvel Comics. The team made their first appearance in Asgardians of the Galaxy #1 (September 2018) by writer Cullen Bunn and artist Matteo Lolli. The series lasted 10 issues.

== Publication history ==
In June 2018, Marvel Comics released a teaser image announcing the debut of Asgardians of the Galaxy. The teaser, which read "The Guardians of the Galaxy are no more... Who are the Asgardians of the Galaxy", came after the release of Infinity Countdown #4 (June 2018) by Gerry Duggan and Mike Deodato Jr., which saw the dissolution of the Guardians of the Galaxy. The following day, Marvel released the first details of the series, which was scheduled to debut in September 2018 by writer Cullen Bunn and artist Matteo Lolli, and features a line-up consisting of characters from Asgard or that have ties to Asgard including; Angela (Thor's sister, who previously joined the Guardians of the Galaxy), Valkyrie (the Asgardian warrior, who Bunn included in his series, Fearless Defenders), Kevin Masterson (the son of Thor's previous host, Eric Masterson), Throg (an anthropomorphic frog that wields a hammer made from a shard of Mjolnir), Skurge (an Asgardian villain-turned-hero), and the Destroyer (an animated suit of Asgardian armor that in the series is being remotely controlled by a pilot revealed later to be Loki).

Cover of the last issue (Asgardians of the Galaxy #10). Art by Gerardo Sandoval.

Bunn stated that he originally pitched the idea of Asgardians of the Galaxy in 2015, but had to wait for the right time, which came after the events of Infinity Countdown. Bunn said that he was inspired by classic Thor comics, the works of Jim Starlin, films like Thor: Ragnarok, Guardians of the Galaxy, and Star Wars, and included a number of "touchstones" ranging from Star Trek to Firefly in his pitch. Bunn also stated that he did not view the Asgardians of the Galaxy as a replacement for the Guardians of the Galaxy but wanted to capture the fun of that series saying, "In this story, a group of Asgardians is drawn into an intergalactic quest to stop a terrible villain, from unleashing something terrible upon the universe. For various reasons, though, this group of Asgardians must work without the knowledge of their peers." The series concluded after 10 issues with the "War of Realms" crossover event.

== Roster ==
| Character | Real name | Joined in | Notes |
|---|---|---|---|
| Angela | | Asgardians of the Galaxy #1 (September 2018) | |
| Valkyrie | Brunnhilde | Asgardians of the Galaxy #1 (September 2018) | |
| Thunderstrike | Kevin Masterson | Asgardians of the Galaxy #1 (September 2018) | |
| Throg | Puddlegulp | Asgardians of the Galaxy #1 (September 2018) | |
| Executioner | Skurge | Asgardians of the Galaxy #1 (September 2018) | |
| Destroyer | | Asgardians of the Galaxy #1 (September 2018) | Remotely controlled by Kid Loki. |

== Collected editions ==
| Title | Material collected | Pages | Publication date | ISBN |
|---|---|---|---|---|
| Vol 1: The Infinity Armada | Asgardians Of The Galaxy #1–5 | 104 pages | March 2019 | 978-1302914714 |
| Vol 2: War Of The Realms | Asgardians Of The Galaxy #6–10 | 98 pages | August 2019 | 978-1302916923 |

== In other media ==
=== Film ===
- In the Marvel Cinematic Universe live-action film Avengers: Endgame (2019), Thor joins the Guardians of the Galaxy, and jokingly refers to them as the "Asgardians of the Galaxy", despite the absence of several team members from the comics.
