= List of Thor (Marvel Comics) supporting characters =

Many of Thor's supporting characters Art by Andrea Di Vito.

Throughout the stories published in Marvel Comics since his first appearance in Journey into Mystery #83 (August 1962), the Thor character has accumulated a number of recognizable supporting characters. Like Thor, many of these characters are based on mythological figures, however a number of original characters have appeared as well. Thor has also formed strong bonds or close working relationships with other superheroes since becoming a founding member of the Avengers in 1963. In addition, Thor has an extensive rogues gallery.

== Family ==
Like Thor most of his family members are based on figures from Norse Mythology and as in those myths they fill major roles throughout the publication. Thor's relationship with his family has been described as "shakespearean".

- Angela: The daughter of Odin and Frigga, who as an infant was presumably killed by Angels of the Tenth Realm known as Heven, during their attack on Asgard.
- Balder: A god of light based on the deity Baldr, is one of Thor's closest friends since childhood. It is revealed that he is actually the son of Odin and Frigga thus making him Thor's half-brother. Odin kept Balder's true identity hidden as he feared a prophecy that stated Balder's death would one day trigger Ragnarök, for this spells were cast making him near-indestructible in Asgard. Balder assumes the throne of Asgard when Thor is exiled.
- Bestla: A Jötunn based on Bestla, is married to Borr, mother of Odin and grandmother of Thor.
- Bor: Odin's father based on the deity Borr, was turned into snow by Loki during a war with the frost giants. Loki later revived Borr, who attacked Thor out of confusion. Thor subsequently kills Bor, not knowing his identity, and is banished from Asgard as a result.
- Buri: Odin's grandfather, based on the deity Búri, was the first of the gods.
- Cul: The god of fear, he is the brother of Odin and uncle of Thor. He is supervillain who had clashed with various Asgardians and other Heroes.
- Frigga: The goddess of marriage based on the deity Frigg, is Odin's wife, step mother of Thor and foster mother to Loki. Frigga is seen as mother figure to most Asgardians even consoling a heartbroken Sif. It is revealed later that she is also mother to Balder whom she once used her powers to make almost completely invulnerable (the notable exception being mistletoe). Frigga was also instrumental in the rearing and training of the Young Gods.
- Gaea: The goddess of the Earth based on the deity Gaia from Greek mythology, is Thor's biological mother. Gaea as Jord (Jörð) mated with Odin, who wanted a son who would be strong on Earth (not just in Asgard) and gave birth to Thor.
- Hermod: God of speed based on the deity Hermóðr, is Thor's half brother by Odin and Frigga. Hermod is employed as Odin's messenger due to his great speed. His greatest mission was when he traveled to Hel in order to ask the goddess Hela for information on how to revive Balder the Brave after Loki tricked Hoder into shooting Balder with an arrow tipped with mistletoe.
- Hoder: God of winter based on the deity Höðr, is Thor's blind cousin, son of his uncle Vili. Loki tricks Holder into shooting Balder with an arrow tipped with mistletoe when testing Balder's invulnerability.
- Loki: God of mischief based on the deity Loki, is Thor's principal antagonist. Loki was orphaned when Odin slew his father Laufey, a frost giant in battle. Odin taking pity on Loki, adopts him as his own son. It is later revealed that Laufey had been killed by a time-traveling Loki.
- Mimir: Based on Mímir, is Odin's uncle and guardian of the well of wisdom. Mimir was beheaded during the Æsir–Vanir War and his living head was brought to Odin, who turned it into fire. In this state, Mimir was given the power of prophecy and Odin made him his advisor.
- Odin: The all-father, ruler of Asgard based on the deity Odin, is Thor's father. Odin with his brothers Vili and Ve slew the frost giant Ymir, who he was descended from, and with his body created the heavens and earth. Odin and his brothers then ventured to Múspellsheimr and fought Surtur. Overwhelmed Vili and Ve sacrificed themselves to allow Odin to escape. Their deaths also granted Odin the "Odinforce".
- Tyr: God of war based on the deity Týr, son of Odin is Thor's older brother. Tyr a veteran who lost his left hand while binding the Fenris wolf was the defender of Asgard before the time of Thor. Tyr becomes resentful when Thor replaces him.
- Vidar: God of strength based on the deity Víðarr, is Odin's son by the jötunn, Grid. Being a half-giant, Vidar was not accepted and lived outside Asgard as a farmer. During Ragnarök, Vidar is killed by trolls while defending his lands.
- Vili and Ve are Odin's brothers, sons of Borr and Bestla. Vili also has a son, Hoder. They sacrificed themselves early in Asgard's history to allow Odin to survive and realize his dreams for Asgard.

=== Genealogy ===
Thor family tree (Note: Thor's family tree as it appears in Thor #500 (July 1996))

Buri
Mimir	Bor	Bestla
Jord	Grid	Odin	Frigga	Vili	Ve	Laufey	Farbauti
Thor	Vidar	Tyr	Hermod	Balder	Loki (adopted by Odin & Frigga)

- Odin has another brother, Cul, introduced in the 2011 miniseries, Fear Itself, who in the comics was erased from all known history. (Note: Fraction, Matt (w), Immonen, Stuart (p), von Grawbadger, Wade (i). "Worlds on Fire" Fear Itself, vol. 1, no. 4 (September 2011). Marvel Comics.) (Note: Fraction, Matt (w), Ferry, Pasqual (a). "Fear Itself: In the Beginning" Thor, vol. 1, no. 7 (December 2011). Marvel Comics.)
- Odin and Frigga have two daughters; Angela, whose parentage was kept secret until the 2014 miniseries Original Sin, (Note: Ewing, Al (w), Garbett, Lee; Bianchi, Simone (a), Woodard, Nolan (col), Sabino, Joe (let), Moss, Will (ed). Original Sin Thor & Loki: The Tenth Realm, no. 1 (July 2014). Marvel Comics.) and Laussa, born during the 2015 series Angela: Asgard's Assassin. (Note: Gillen, Kieron; Bennett, Marguerite (w), Jimenez, Phil; Hans, Stephanie (p), Hanna, Scott; Hans, Stephanie (i), Farjado Jr., Romulo; Hans, Stephanie (col), Cowles, Clayton (let), Moss, Will; Moison, Jon (ed). Angela: Asgard's Assassin, no. 6 (July 2015). Marvel Comics.)

== Other superheroes ==
Thor regularly interacts with other Marvel superheroes as a member of the Avengers. A few, however, have marked a presence in the core Thor titles:

- Beta Ray Bill: An alien from the Korbinite race, the warrior Bill proved worthy to lift Mjolnir. He beat Thor in a battle for the right to wield the hammer, but when he decided to let the thunder god keep it after all, he was awarded the mystical hammer Stormbreaker by Odin as a reward. Since receiving Stormbreaker, Bill has been a loyal ally of Thor and the Asgardians, especially Sif whom he has developed a particularly close relationship.
- Captain America: The honorary co-founder of the Avengers has developed a close bond with Thor over the years as a brother in arms. This bond was further strengthened when Captain America proved worthy to lift Mjolnir.
- Hercules: The son of Zeus based on the hero Heracles from Greek mythology, is both the longtime friend and rival of Thor. Their friendly rivalry begins after Thor (without his powers) is beaten by Hercules but then rescues him from Hades.
- Hulk: A co-founder of the Avengers shares one of the most significant rivalries in the Marvel Universe with Thor. The rivalry begins after the Hulk leaves the Avengers and allies with Namor as the latter bids to rule over humanity. The two's rivalry comes to a head during the events of Fear Itself, in which Thor fights Hulk, who has been turned into Nul.
- Iron Man: A co-founder of the Avengers like Captain America has developed a friendship with Thor. Iron Man with Captain America even aided Asgard during Ragnarök. However this friendship was strained when Thor returns and learns that Iron Man and others used his DNA to build a clone to fight in the Civil War.
- Silver Surfer: A former herald of Galactus, the Silver Surfer became an ally of Thor after Loki attempted to use the Surfer as a tool to defeat his brother. Convinced Thor is evil by Loki, the Surfer is transported to Asgard and challenges Thor to a fight. However, the Surfer realizes that he has been deceived when he sees Thor's honor in battle.
- Thor Girl: An alien destined to become the Designate, a being who will help evolve sentient beings to the next level of existence becomes an ally and admirer of Thor after he helps defeat Thanos who destroyed her home world. She then comes to Earth, transforms herself into an Asgardian and takes the name Thor Girl.
- Thunderstrike: An architect by the name of Eric Masterson is initially bonded with Thor after Thor is punished for apparently killing Loki. Masterson carries the mantle of Thor for several years, continuing Thor's dual roles as a member of the Avengers and protector of Midgard. Thor is eventually freed, and in gratitude for his services, Odin provides Masterson with an enchanted mace, which he uses under the alias of Thunderstrike.
- Storm: A member of the X-Men, when she along with the New Mutants were captured by Loki, he gave her a replica of Mjolnir called Stormcaster in order to discredit Thor, however, this backfired.

== Love interests ==
Thor has had several notable romances throughout his long history:

- Sif, a warrior based on the deity Sif, is one of Thor's main love interests. However, Thor's draw to Earth has been a constant distraction. Sif did for a time try to live a mortal life on Earth, but found it to be mundane and returned to Asgard. Furthermore, their relationship has suffered from numerous interruptions by other women, particularly Jane Foster, the Enchantress, and Lorelei.
- Jane Foster: A nurse, Foster was involved in a love triangle with Thor and Donald Blake, not knowing they were the same person. Thor eventually reveals the truth to Foster and takes her to Asgard where she is granted immortality and status as a goddess. Disapproving, Odin strips Foster of her powers and returns her to Earth without memories of Asgard, where she marries Keith Kinkaid and has a child. Much later, Donald Blake returns to Earth after emerging from the void of nonexistence and encounters Foster, who has since divorced Kinkaid. After a rocky exchange, the two agree to go on a date.
- The Enchantress is one of Thor's most notable antagonists and lovers. Since her introduction, the Enchantress has often tried to use her magic to seduce Thor and eliminate her competition for Thor's affections. However, Thor did form a willing romance with Amora during a vulnerable state when Odin abandoned him without his powers on Earth. This relationship reached its pinnacle when Thor assumed the throne of Asgard and took the Enchantress as his bride. Amora helped Thor create a dark future in which they ruled Asgard and Earth with an iron fist and even had a child, Magni. However, this was all undone when Thor traveled back in time to prevent this future from occurring.
- Shawna Lynde, a fellow doctor of Donald Blake's. Both had supposedly graduated from medical school together. Lynde had an open crush on Blake, but was unaware of his connection as Thor. She too was briefly caught in a love triangle between herself Blake and Sif, however she was unaware of Sif's identity and thought that she was Blake's cousin Sybil. When Donald Blake ceased to exist, Lynde had her memories of him wiped by Fandral.
- Lorelei, like her sister Amora, the Enchantress, has also used magic to gain the affections of Thor. Loki persuaded Lorelei into giving Thor an elixir that would cause him to fall in love with her. Loki hoped Lorelei could then use her influence over Thor to gain his support for Loki's bid for the throne of Asgard. However, the Enchantress jealously cast a spell of her own, which caused Lorelei to fall in love with Loki. Heimdall in turn used this to expose Thor to their plot.
- Brunnhilde the valkyrie attempted (to no avail) to save the life of Thor, who was incarnated as Sigmund against Odin's wishes. Brunnhilde was, however, able to keep Sigmund's pregnant wife, Sieglinde, from harm. As punishment, Odin removed Brunnhilde's powers and cast her into a deep sleep. Brunnhilde is eventually awakened by Thor, who reincarnated as Siegfried, the son of Sigmund and Sieglinde. Brunnhilde and Siegfried become lovers, but Siegfried, under the influence of magic, betrays her. When Siegfried is killed, Brunnhilde, who is still in love with him, jumps into his blazing funeral pyre. Odin, so moved by these events, fully restores both Brunnhilde and Thor but wipes their memories.
- She-Hulk, during the battle against the Dark Celestials, Jennifer Walters became romantically involved with Thor, but was concerned that Thor was only interested in her She-Hulk persona, until they had a heart-to-heart moment.

== Other supporting characters ==
- Donald Blake: A handicapped surgeon, Blake is Thor's most significant mortal host. Blake discovered that he had merged with Thor when he found Mjolnir in the form of a stick while vacationing in Norway.
- Frey: based on the deity Freyr, helped construct Valhalla. After Valhalla was damaged in an attack Odin bribed two giants to restore it by promising to give them Idunn. Loki promised to Odin that he would keep Idunn safe and the debt would never be paid but Loki handed Idunn over to the giants anyway. Frey and Thor fought the two giants but were forced to stand down when Odin revealed his promise to the giants. However the giants did agree to relinquish Idunn in exchange for the ring of Nibelung.
- Freya: Goddess of fertility based on the deity Freyja, is the sister of Frey. When Thor's hammer Mjolnir was stolen by the giant, Thyrm, he offered its return in exchange for the hand of Freya in marriage. However Freya refused to be bartered away and Thor was forced to dress in Freya's clothes in order to trick the giant into returning his hammer.
- Heimdall: The brother of Sif based on the deity Heimdall, is the omniscient sentry of Asgard that stands guard on the Bifröst bridge. After Ragnarök, Heimdall was the first Asgardian to be restored by Thor, so that he may aid in locating the others.
- Hugin and Munin: Based on the ravens of the same names from Norse mythology. Munin and Hugin are brothers and the ravens of Odin. He sends them out into the Nine Realms each day to learn what was transpiring. They are the ones that tell Odin about the coming of Ragnarök.
- Idunn: Based on the deity Iðunn, is the keeper of the golden apples. Idunn was offered as payment to two giants for restoring the walls of Valhalla but the giants settled for the ring of Nibelung.
- Kelda Stormrider: An Asgardian with weather manipulation abilities, first appearing in the third volume of Thor. Kelda is resurrected alongside Asgard in Oklahoma, after the events of Ragnarok. She falls in love with a human, Bill Cobb and together they uncover Loki's plot with Doctor Doom in Latveria, leading to them both being killed. Kelda is later revived by Balder, before being killed by Karnilla and reuniting with Bill in Valhalla.
- Leir: A Celtic god based on Lir who assists Thor in fighting Seth.
- Magni: Born during the alternate future known as the Reigning, Magni is the son of Thor and the Enchantress. Magni grew up unaware of the extent of his parents' tyranny on Earth until he witnessed the Warriors Three brutally put down a human uprising.
- Jake Olson: A paramedic who was bonded with Thor for a time. Olson was killed during a battle between the Avengers and the Destroyer. Thor is also nearly killed in the battle, but is restored by Odin's servant Marnot after Thor agrees to take Olson's place.
- Roger "Red" Norvell: A mortal who was part of a documentary crew brought to Asgard by Loki, meets and falls in love with Lady Sif. Loki gives Norvell Thor's Iron Gauntlets and Belt of Strength to compete with Thor for Sif's affections, with neither realizing this was part of a master plan by Odin to create a surrogate God of Thunder to fulfill a prophecy and die fighting the Midgard Serpent.
- Sigyn: Goddess of fidelity based on the deity Sigyn, is married to Loki. Sigyn's beauty caught the eye of Loki but she was already engaged to another. Before Sigyn's marriage Loki jealously killed her fiancé and used a spell to take his form during the ceremony. Loki revealed his true identity, but Sigyn remained with him due to Asgardian law. After Balder's death, Loki is punished by being chained to a rock, where a snake constantly drips poison on his face. Sigyn, being ever loyal, comes to Loki's aid by catching the poison in a bowl. However, Sigyn must periodically leave to empty the bowl and during the time she is gone, the poison drips in Loki's eye. Loki abandons her for this after he is freed.
- Thialfi: Based on mythological figure Þjálfi, was one of Thor's advisors during the time known as The Reigning. Thialfi was born during the Viking Age and his parents were killed by Viking marauders. Thor finds Thialfi and convinces Odin to help Thialfi by transforming him into an Asgardian with the condition that Thor one day take Thialfi into his fold. Thialfi is later transported to the future by Zarrko where he becomes one of Thor's advisors. Thialfi soon learns of the dark side of Thor's reign and plots to kill him while he is in the Odinsleep. Thialfi almost does this, but is killed by Freki.
- Throg: Puddlegulp is a frog who Thor encounters after being transformed into a frog by Loki. Puddlegulp belongs to a community of frogs living in Central Park in New York City, who were engaged in a territorial dispute with the Park's rats. Puddlegulp befriends Thor, who aids the frog King Glugwart in defeating the rats. Before Thor departs (forcing Loki to undo the spell), Puddlegulp revealed that he was once human, and had been transformed by a Romani. The series Lockjaw and the Pet Avengers reveals that Puddlegulp's original name was Simon Walterson (a reference to Thor writer Walt Simonson). Puddlegulp finds a sliver of Thor's hammer Mjolnir and uses it to become Throg, the Frog of Thunder.
- Volla: A wraith, Volla serves as an advisor to Hela because of her precognitive powers. Volla dies after making known her prophecies of Ragnarök.
- Warriors Three: A group of three Asgardian adventurers that are also among Thor's closest comrades.

- Fandral the Dashing is the leader of the group.
- Hogun the Grim is the only member of the group who is not an Æsir.
- Volstagg the Valiant is the comic relief of the group known for his hearty appetite and wide girth.

- William: A mortal man with whom the goddess Kelda falls in love. William travels with the Asgardians to Latveria but is killed trying to warn Balder about Doctor Doom's plans.
- Zeus: Ruler of the Olympians, based on the deity Zeus from Greek mythology.
