= Dwarves (Marvel Comics) =

Marvel comics

Publication information
- Publisher: Marvel Comics
- First appearance: Journey Into Mystery #103 (April 1964)

Characteristics
- Place of origin: Nidavellir
- Pantheon: Norse

There are different types of fictional dwarves appearing in American comic books published by Marvel Comics. The most common of the Dwarves are the ones that are based on the dwarves of Norse mythology. They frequently appear in stories featuring the superhero Thor.

== History ==
=== Dwarves of Weirdworld ===
There are a race of dwarves that reside in Weirdworld. The Elf Tyndall of Klarn once lived with a warren of Dwarves who were besieged by the Night-Fangers. They sent him on a quest where Tyndall encountered the newly hatched Velanna.

Tyndall and Velanna later met the dwarf thief Mud-Butt who later became their ally.

=== Dwarves of Asgard ===
The Dwarves were smaller in stature than the Asgardians and had squat, stocky bodies. They were stronger and faster than they appeared to be, with fighting skills allowing them to take down larger opponents. The Dwarves tended to be craftsmen and farmers who maintained friendly trade and peace relations with the Gods of Asgard, even though they were also known for sending minor Asgardians to the Trolls as slaves. Dwarves dwell in the realm of Nidavellir, one of the Nine Realms. Nidavellir was part of the landmass where Asgard, Alfheim, and Vanaheim were all situated. Dwarves crafted such legendary Asgardian weapons as Thor's hammer Mjolnir and Odin's spear Gungnir.

Thor arrives at the workshop of King Sindri of the dwarves, where he is given a magical boat to carry him on a special mission for Odin. The boat is small enough to fit in a pocket, but grows to full size and flies if needed. Seeking cover from a raging storm, Thor asks Sindri to provide him shelter. The Dwarves requiring to provide another slave to the Trolls as payment to avoid their kingdom being attacked and they drop Thor down into the pit of the Trolls, unaware of who he was.

Thor and Odin called upon the services of the Dwarves, who crafted Stormbreaker for Beta Ray Bill so that he can fight off the demons plaguing the Korbinites.

When Storm and the New Mutants were in Asgard, Cannonball ends up underground in the Dwarves' territory, where he finds it under siege by Rock Trolls. After he is stabbed in the back while saving Eitri's wife, he is healed following the battle and is welcomed as a true friend to the Dwarves. The Dwarves are then attacked by the Dark Elves and a warped Magma.

During the "Fear Itself" storyline, Iron Man pleads with Odin to let him use his workshops to make weapons for his Avengers to fight the Serpent and the Worthy. He meets with Splitlip, who agrees to help Iron Man make new weapons. As Iron Man concludes that he needs to place his armor into the Uru metal to enhance it, he and the Dwarves are attacked by a Golem created by the Serpent's followers. When the Golem leeches off Iron Man's armor, the Dwarves help Iron Man defeat it.

== Known Dwarves ==
=== Dwarves of Weirdworld ===
- Mud-Butt –
- Perna –

=== Dwarves of Asgard ===
- Brokk – A Dwarf blacksmith and brother of Eitri who took part in forging Mjolnir.
- Eitri – The King of the Dwarves who is a master blacksmith.
- Kamorr – A Dwarf who is a servant and personal friend of Heimdall.
- Kindra – A Dwarf who is the daughter of Eitri.
- Screwbeard – A Dwarf who is a member of the League of Realms.
- Sindri – Sindri was the king of the Dwarves during Thor's youth.
- Splitlip – The Dwarven Master of Nidavellir.
- Throgg – A Dwarf blacksmith.
- Tooth – A Dwarf who worked at Nidavellir.

== In other media ==
- The Dwarves of Asgard appear in The Avengers: Earth's Mightiest Heroes episode "The Fall of Asgard".
- The Dwarves of Asgard appear in Avengers: Infinity War. When Thor, Rocket, and Groot arrive on Nidavellir, they find Eitri, who informs them that Thanos killed most of the Dwarves after they forged the Infinity Gauntlet.
- The Dwarves of Asgard appear in Thor: The Dark World - The Official Game.
