= Valkyrie (Marvel Comics) =

Marvel Comics superhero

- Variant cover of Secret Avengers #3 (July 2010); Art by Mike Deodato

Publication information
- Publisher: Marvel Comics
- First appearance: Brunhilde: Thor #133 (October 1966); Imposter: The Avengers #83 (December 1970); Barbara Norriss version: Defenders #4 (November 1972)
- Created by: Brunhilde: Stan Lee (writer); Jack Kirby (artist); Imposter: Roy Thomas (writer); John Buscema (artist); Barbara Norriss version: Steve Englehart (writer); Sal Buscema (artist)

In-story information
- Alter ego: Brunnhilde
- Species: Asgardian valkyrie
- Team affiliations: Valkyrior; Avengers; Secret Avengers; Defenders
- Notable aliases: Sian Bowen; Annabelle Riggs; Barbara Norriss; Samantha Parrington
- Abilities: Superhuman strength, speed, agility, stamina, reflexes, durability, and longevity; Mediumship with the spirits of the dead; Regenerative healing factor; Mystical teleportation; Skilled armed and unarmed combatant

Valkyrie, also known by her Asgardian name Brunnhilde, is a superheroine appearing in American comic books published by Marvel Comics. Created by Steve Englehart and Sal Buscema, the character first appeared in Defenders #4 (November 1972). She is based on the Norse mythological figure Brynhildr. Valkyrie became a mainstay of the superhero team known as the Defenders and a close ally and one-time love interest of the god Thor.

Valkyrie was selected by Odin to lead his personal unit of shield-maidens, the Valkyrior. Renowned for her prowess in battle, Valkyrie is often accompanied by her winged horse Aragorn and carries the enchanted sword Dragonfang. In the 2010s, Valkyrie became a founding member of the Secret Avengers and co-leader of the Fearless Defenders with Misty Knight. Among Valkyrie's other aliases are Barbara Norris, Samantha Parrington, Sian Bowen and Annabelle Riggs, who all, at one point, hosted her spirit. Samantha Parrington, one of Valkyrie's previous hosts, later received superhuman powers and became a member of the Defenders herself.

Tessa Thompson portrays a different version of the character in the Marvel Cinematic Universe films, replacing what appeared to be Brunhilde, who was killed by Hela, along with all other Valkyries, in the film Thor: Ragnarok. Thompson’s Valkyrie has subsequently appeared in Avengers: Endgame (2019), Thor: Love and Thunder (2022), and The Marvels (2023). Thompson also voiced alternate variants of the character in the Disney+ animated series What If...? (2021–2024) and the television series Marvel Zombies (2025).

== Publication history ==
The Valkyrie first appeared as a guise of the Enchantress in The Avengers #83 (December 1970) and was created by Roy Thomas and John Buscema. Thomas used another iteration of the character when the Valkyrie persona was placed into a mortal woman named Samantha Parrington as an adversary for the Hulk in The Incredible Hulk vol. 2 #142 (August 1971).

Roy Thomas publicly stated the character's creation, "I wanted a sort of female Thor, but of course at first I just made her a disguise of the Enchantress in THE AVENGERS. I left the look mostly to John Buscema, though I may have said I wanted her to be blonde."

Writer Steve Englehart and artist Sal Buscema put the Valkyrie's essence into another mortal woman, Barbara Norriss, in The Defenders #4 (February 1973) and had the character join the group as a longtime member. Englehart has stated that he added the Valkyrie to the Defenders "to provide some texture to the group". Steve Gerber introduced Jack Norris as the estranged husband of Barbara but the Valkyrie persona had no memory of him. Writers David Anthony Kraft and Ed Hannigan explained some of the Valkyrie's backstory in The Defenders #66-68 (Dec. 1978–Feb. 1979). Three years later, writers J. M. DeMatteis and Mark Gruenwald wrote a follow-up story in The Defenders #107-109 (May–July 1982) which resolved remaining plot points from the Kraft and Hannigan story.

The Valkyrie remained a member of the Defenders through most of the series' run and is apparently killed in the final issue, #152 (Feb. 1986). According to writer Peter B. Gillis, the Valkyrie's death was part of an editorial edict to free up the surviving Defenders for use in X-Factor. The character was restored to life in a Doctor Strange storyline written by Gillis in 1988 and made only a few appearances in the 1990s.

In 2001, writer Kurt Busiek and co-writer/penciller Erik Larsen revived the Defenders series and restored Samantha Parrington as the mortal incarnation of the Valkyrie.

The Valkyrie's Asgardian iteration was restored in a one-shot comic book and the character appeared regularly throughout the Secret Avengers series, from issue #1 (July 2010) through its final issue #37 (March 2013). Valkyrie appears in the 2013 series Fearless Defenders by Cullen Bunn and Will Sliney.

Valkyrie began appearing as part of the Asgardians of the Galaxy team in 2018, and she plays a part in the War of the Realms storyline in 2019.

== Fictional character biography ==
Brunnhilde was selected by Odin, King of the Gods of the realm of Asgard, to lead the Valkyrior (the Choosers of the Slain), a group of warrior goddesses who would appear over the battlefields of mortal worshippers of the Asgardian gods and choose which of the fallen were worthy to be taken to Valhalla, the land of the honored dead. Brunnhilde served capably in this capacity for centuries.

According to a sentient, disembodied eye that claimed to have once belonged to Odin, the Asgardian monarch once gave his son Thor the mortal identity of the warrior Siegmund. Circumstances forced Odin to decree that Siegmund must be slain. Brunnhilde, recognizing that Odin was acting against his true wishes, sought to protect Siegmund, but Odin himself then caused Siegmund's death. Brunnhilde helped Siegmund's pregnant lover, Sieglinde get to safety. As punishment for her defiance, Odin removed Brunnhilde's Asgardian powers and immortality and cast her into a trance. She was eventually awakened by Siegfried, the son of Siegmund and Sieglinde and another mortal incarnation of Thor.

Brunnhilde and Siegfried became lovers, and she made him invulnerable so long as his back was not turned on his foe. Siegfried fell under the influence of magic and betrayed her. He was later murdered, and Brunnhilde, still in love with him, leapt into his blazing funeral pyre (this part of her background was based on the Volsunga saga). Odin restored both of them to life, restoring their Asgardian roles and powers, but removing their memories of their earthly lives. It is unclear how much truth, if any, there is to this account by the eye.

Brunnhilde and her fellow Valkyries continued to gather heroic mortal warriors for Valhalla until roughly a millennium ago, when Odin was forced to cease virtually all interaction with the Earth in accordance with a pact that he and the leaders of Earth's other pantheons of gods made with the extraterrestrial Celestials. From then onward, the Valkyries could only choose slain heroes from among fallen Asgardian warriors. Brunnhilde was bitter over being barred from choosing warriors on Earth and roamed Asgard in pursuit of something meaningful to do. In a tavern on the outskirts of Marmoragard, Brunnhilde encountered Amora the Enchantress, who offered her a life of adventure. For several weeks Brunnhilde accompanied the Enchantress on her conquests. Brunnhilde soon discovered Amora's immoral nature and tried to end their partnership. In response the Enchantress trapped Brunnhilde within a mystic crystal of souls. While Brunnhilde's body remained in suspended animation, her immortal soul became Amora's plaything. Over the centuries the Enchantress used Brunnhilde's spiritual essence to give the Valkyrie's powers to herself or to her pawns.

Specific instances of Amora's exploitation of the Valkyrie before recent years are not yet known. The first time the Enchantress assumed the Valkyrie's physical aspect in recent years was in a plot to lead a handful of female superhumans against the male Avengers as the Lady Liberators. Her true identity was discovered and her plan thwarted. Months later, the Enchantress bestowed the Valkyrie's power on socialite Samantha Parrington in an attempt to get revenge on the Hulk.

Cover of The Avengers #83 (Dec. 1970) by John Buscema and Tom Palmer

Finally, a woman driven mad by being trapped in another mystical dimension, Barbara Norriss, was given the Valkyrie's power and consciousness by the Enchantress to help her then-allies, the group of superhumans called the Defenders, escape from the clutches of the sorceress Casiolena. Amora did not undo her spell on Norris after Casiolena's defeat. As a result, Norris' body now possessed Brunnhilda's consciousness, appearance, and powers, while Norriss' own mental essence was trapped in Brunnhilde's real body in Asgard. Aware that she was an immortal essence in a mortal woman's body, the Valkyrie briefly left the Defenders in an attempt to discover Barbara Norriss' past. She meets Norriss' father, Alvin Denton, shortly before his death and then returns to the Defenders.

After Asgardian warrior Ollerus attempts to take over Valhalla, the Valkyrie's two mixed aspects met for the first time. Brunnhilde's mental essence, trapped in Norris's transformed body, fought Norriss' mental essence trapped in Brunnhilde's real body. At the end of that encounter, the Valkyrie's body, still possessed by Norriss' mind, was consigned to Niffleheim, the realm inhabited by the spirits of the non-heroic Asgardian dead, while Brunnhilde's mind in Norris' transformed body accompanied the Defenders, who had made the other dimensional journey with her, back to Earth.

For reasons yet unknown, Brunnhilde was not concerned at this time about reuniting her mind with her true body. It was not until Barbara Norriss' body was murdered that the Valkyrie's spirit and mind were inadvertently freed from their mortal host. With the help of Doctor Strange's magic, Brunnhilde regained her true body, which was rescued from Niffleheim by the Enchantress. Back in her real body, Brunnhilde regained her full memory and normal warrior personality as well. Brunnhilde then battled Amora and banished her to the crystal of souls. Feeling estranged from Asgard in general and Odin in particular for their neglect of her centuries-long plight, Brunnhilde chose to return to Earth with the Defenders.

Cover of The Defenders #66 (Dec. 1978) by John Buscema and Bob McLeod

Odin placed the dangerously powerful self-styled goddess Moondragon into Brunnhilde's charge. Brunnhilde was to teach Moondragon humility, and Moondragon served alongside Brunnhilde in the Defenders. Brunnhilde was to take action against Moondragon should she again become a menace. Eventually Moondragon reformed, but later she fell once again under the malevolent influence of the alien entity called the Dragon of the Moon. Moondragon attacked the Defenders, but Brunnhilde, given temporary additional powers by Odin for this occasion, including the power to grow to gigantic stature, opposed her. Brunnhilde summoned other Valkyries to her aid and together with two other Defenders, Angel and Cloud, they defeated Moondragon but failed to capture her.

Months later Moondragon returned to attack the Defenders. During this encounter, her power was vastly augmented by the alien Beyonder. In order to defeat the Dragon, Brunnhilde and the Eternal called Interloper projected their immortal life forces against it. They were joined by Defenders member Andromeda and the Defenders' former foe Manslaughter, for it was necessary that Brunnhilde's and Interloper's life forces pass through "mortal instruments" in order that Moondragon be defeated as well. Joining hands, the four allies hurled the tremendous power of their combined life forces at the Dragon, Moondragon, and Gargoyle, whose body was now under the Dragon's control. Three other Defenders went to rescue endangered innocents, and when they returned, Brunnhilde, Interloper, Andromeda, Manslaughter, Moondragon, and Gargoyle had all seemingly been transformed into statues of ashes and dust, and the Dragon of the Moon was apparently gone.

Brunnhilde was restored to life by Doctor Strange, now in the host body of a woman known as Sian Bowen. The other Defenders, Interloper, Andromeda, and Manslaughter were restored to life as well and they formed the Dragon Circle to battle the Dragon of the Moon. After the Dragon of the Moon was defeated, Brunnhilde returned to Asgard. Brunnhilde was killed in battle just before Loki's destruction of Asgard.

With the return of the Asgardians to Earth, Brunnhilde was next seen as a member of the Secret Avengers. Writer Ed Brubaker confirmed that the Valkyrie on the team was the original Brunnhilde.

After the 2011 storyline "Fear Itself", Brunhilde seemingly defects from the Secret Avengers, embarking in a mission to steal and recover for herself the hammers used by the "Worthy", Cul's servants. She later reveals to have stopped consuming the Apples of Idunn, thus lessening her stamina and resilience and reverting to a mortal form, and as a Valkyrior she is able to seal within herself the hammers. She plans to die after the deed is over, so as to banish the worthy from the human plane of existence for the rest of eternity. At the end of the series, the All Mother (Freyja, Gaea, and Idunn) task her with selecting a new group of Valkyries. Only this time the new Valkyries are to be all women from Earth. The story continues in the 2013 The Fearless Defenders series in which Valkyrie recruits Misty Knight, Danielle Moonstar, Hippolyta, and the mortal scientist Annabelle Riggs as part of the new Valkyrior to stop Caroline le Fey, the daughter of Morgan le Fey, and the Doommaidens, corrupted undead Valkyries who have awakened in the Valkyrior's absence. During this time, Valkyrie develops a brief romance with Riggs, who later becomes host to Valkyrie's spirit after Riggs sacrifices herself to save the team.

During the 2014 "AXIS" storyline, Valkyrie is among the heroes recruited by an inverted Doctor Doom to join his team of Avengers. During the 2017 "Monsters Unleashed" storyline, Valkyrie and Hippolyta are seen fighting Leviathon Tide monsters in Edinburgh. Angela recruits her to join the Asgardians of the Galaxy.

In "The War of the Realms", Valkyrie and the rest of the Valkrior are killed by Malekith during his invasion of New York.

== Powers and abilities ==
Valkyrie is the strongest of all Valkyrior. Like all her people, her body is several times denser than that of humans. She is not immortal, but she ages far more slowly than humans. Valkyrie is immune to all earthly diseases and is difficult to injure. Her Asgardian physiology grants her enhanced levels of stamina. Valkyrie can perceive the approach of death, in the form of a "deathglow" surrounding a person's body. She does not know how death will come but she can tell that it is imminent. Valkyrie can transport herself and a dying or dead body to and from the realm of the dead by willing it. Valkyrie has had extensive training in sword fighting as well as unarmed combat and horseback riding. Her natural fighting ability is among the best of all Asgardians, matched only by Sif.

=== Weapons and equipment ===
Valkyrie carries two weapons of choice: an enchanted sword named Dragonfang and an unnamed spear. A wizard named Kahji-Da was said to have carved the sword from a tooth of an extra-dimensional dragon. The sword eventually passed into the possession of the Ancient One, who in turn gave it to his disciple Doctor Strange. Strange went on to return it to the Valkyrie after she had bequeathed the virtually indestructible Black Knight's Ebony Blade to its rightful owner.

Like most sword-wielding comics heroes, Valkyrie used the sword strictly as a bludgeon, hitting opponents with the flat of the blade. This was because comics publishers wanted to avoid glorifying lethal violence. Writer David Anthony Kraft's friend Henry Vogel said that Kraft once told him that had he remained writer on The Defenders longer, he planned to replace Valkyrie's sword with a quarterstaff because he considered it ridiculous for a character to have a sword if they could not use it in the normal manner.

Valkyrie rides a winged horse named Aragorn. Aragorn was given to her by the current Black Knight.

== Reception ==
=== Accolades ===
- In 2011, Comics Buyer's Guide ranked Valkyrie 65th in their "100 Sexiest Women in Comics" list.
- In 2012, IGN ranked Valkyrie 30th in their "Top 50 Avengers" list.
- in 2014, Autostraddle ranked Valkyrie 3rd in their "11 Female Superheroes I Wish Marvel Would Make Movies About" list.
- In 2019, CBR.com ranked Valkyrie 5th in their "10 Greatest Swordsmen & Women In DC & Marvel Comics" list.
- In 2020, CBR.com ranked Valkyrie 7th in their "15 Strongest Swordfighters In Marvel Comics" list.
- In 2022, The Mary Sue ranked Valkyrie 4th in their "All of Thor's Love Interests in Marvel Comics" list.
- In 2022, Screen Rant included Valkyrie in their "10 Best Marvel Characters Who Debuted in The Avengers Comics" list and "9 Most Powerful Valkyrie Variants in Marvel Comics" list.

== Other characters named Valkyrie ==
=== Samantha Parrington ===
Samantha Parrington on the cover of The Order #4. Art by Carlos Pacheco.

The Enchantress first transformed Samantha Parrington into the Valkyrie temporarily to gain revenge against the Hulk. On Earth, Pluto and Lorelei much later restored the Valkyrie's powers within Parrington. Pluto tricked Lorelei though, erasing her memory, draining her powers, and turning her into a duplicate of Valkyrie. While Parrington was used by Pluto to turn Earth into a realm of the dead, Lorelei was found by the Defender Nighthawk, who believed she was the real Valkyrie and made her a Defender, though she never spoke. When the Defenders tried to stop Pluto, Lorelei battled Parrington and was restored to her former self. Parrington was freed from Pluto's control and she became part of the Defenders again as Valkyrie. She and her teammate Hellcat later got an apartment together and Parrington remembered her real name when someone called her by her nickname "Sam". The two superheroines then met her parents, who thought that her transformation into Valkyrie was just a phase she was going through. To Parrington's chagrin, her parents are proud of her and turn their mansion into the Defenders base.

=== Jane Foster ===
Jane Foster became Thor for a time and lost her powers. All Valkyries died during The War of the Realms and Foster becomes the new Valkyrie by the end of it.

== Other versions ==
=== Exiles ===
The MCU-inspired version of Valkyrie on a variant cover of Exiles vol. 3 #1 (June 2018). Art by Javier Rodriguez.

In January 2018, Marvel announced that a version of Valkyrie inspired by Tessa Thompson's portrayal of the character in Thor: Ragnarok would join the Exiles in a series by writer Saladin Ahmed and artist Javier Rodriguez. Ahmed said, "Though she's not technically from the Marvel Cinematic Universe reality, she's basically the literalization of the larger-than-her-physical-frame swagger that Tessa Thompson displayed in Thor: Ragnarok, turned up to 11."

=== Ultimate Marvel ===
In the Ultimate Marvel universe, Valkyrie is a 19-year-old girl named Barbara Norris who aspires to play the public role of superhero, despite having no actual powers or skills. When Hank Pym is dismissed from the Ultimates, he decides to join the Defenders and encounters Norris.

Valkyrie next appears in The Ultimates 3 #1, now apparently super-powered, riding a black Pegasus and wielding a large, supposedly mystical sword, but seems to have no idea where these powers or weapons came from. At that point, she has been in a romantic live-in relationship with Thor for weeks and despite cultural differences, they are very close and allude to being in love. Since her last appearance, she appears to have been granted super strength and limited invulnerability; other superhuman attributes and abilities remain unknown. She speaks with a distinct valley girl accent, and while she does not seem to be the most intelligent of her teammates, she makes up for it with her loyalty, especially to Thor, and her big heart, along with being very powerful. At several points, she makes references to having lived a quiet, normal human life before becoming superhuman. She suggests she is more akin to Thor than it may seem, possibly meaning they may have some sort of shared Asgardian heritage. Her deepest fear is returning to the powerless, poor, and somewhat comically ordinary existence she had before. When confronted with this fear by Mastermind, just before her two captors decide to assault her sexually, she is broken free of the illusion by a shadowy figure who claims to be the source of her new powers; she then retaliates by killing Mastermind and cutting off Pyro's hands.

During the 2009 "Ultimatum" storyline, it is revealed that Valkyrie was killed and transported to Valhalla, the Asgardian afterlife for fallen warriors run by Hela, an Asgardian goddess, who is presented as above most other Asgardian gods in power and station. Thor learns of this and transports himself to Hela's dimension, demanding he let Valkyrie live again. Hela, then states that if he is able to overcome the challenge presented to him, he may bring Valkyrie back to the land of the living. In the middle of the ensuing battle, Thor finds that Captain America's soul is also there, having been killed in the real world as well. Thor and Capt. America win the challenge and Hela grants Thor's request, but with the catch that once a soul has entered Hela's realm, it cannot leave without being substituted, so Thor gives up his soul so that Valkyrie may live and Hela returns her to Earth, while Thor's soul remains in the afterlife. Valkyrie, enraged and heart broken at the loss and sacrifice of her love, joins the battle once more and attacks Magneto, who apparently kills her. Her fate is unknown until New Ultimates where it is revealed she now wields Thor's hammer. She loses it in battle with the Defenders, who now have superpowers due to Loki's intervention. She is killed in the battle which allows Thor to resurrect and face Loki. During the battle, Loki is suddenly killed by Valkyrie. Although apparently alive again, she reveals that she is now a servant of Hela.

== In other media ==
=== Television ===
- The Brunnhilde version of Valkyrie appears in The Super Hero Squad Show, voiced by Michelle Trachtenberg. This version is a founding member of the Defenders.
- The Brunnhilde version of Valkyrie appears in The Avengers: Earth's Mightiest Heroes episode "The Fall of Asgard", voiced by Colleen O'Shaughnessey.
- Valkyrie, based on the MCU incarnation (see below), appears in Guardians of the Galaxy, voiced by Raven-Symoné.

=== Film ===
- The Brunnhilde version of Valkyrie appears in Hulk vs. Thor, voiced by an uncredited Nicole Oliver.
- The Brunnhilde version of Valkyrie appears in Thor: Tales of Asgard, voiced by Cathy Weseluck.

=== Marvel Cinematic Universe ===
Tessa Thompson as Valkyrie in the 2017 film Thor: Ragnarok

Tessa Thompson portrays Valkyrie in media set in the Marvel Cinematic Universe (MCU).

- Valkyrie is introduced in Thor: Ragnarok. Years prior, the Valkyrior were wiped out by Hela when Odin sent them to stop her. As the only survivor after being saved by a fellow warrior, she ended up on Sakaar, where she became one of the Grandmaster's primary warriors under the name Scrapper 142, drinks heavily to cope with her PTSD, and in 2015, befriended the Hulk after he had traveled there. In 2017, Thor arrives following his own battle with Hela and attempts to escape. Valkyrie is initially reluctant to help him, but changes her mind after Loki uses his powers to make her relive the massacre. She joins Thor and Bruce Banner in escaping Sakaar and traveling to Asgard, where she helps the Asgardians evacuate from Hela's undead forces. After Asgard is destroyed by Surtur, she travels with Thor, Hulk, and the Asgardian refugees on the Grandmaster's starship, the Statesman, to find a new home.
- While she does not appear in Avengers: Infinity War, Valkyrie is stated to have survived Thanos' attack on the Statesman and the Blip.
- Valkyrie returns in Avengers: Endgame, in which she has settled into the Asgardian refugee community, New Asgard, on Earth. In 2023, she briefly reunites with Banner when he and Rocket arrive to recruit Thor to help them retrieve the Infinity Stones. She later joins the Avengers in fighting an alternate timeline variant of Thanos and is appointed the new ruler of New Asgard by Thor.
- Alternate timeline variants of Valkyrie appear in What If...?, voiced by Tessa Thompson.
- Valkyrie returns in Thor: Love and Thunder. Now going by King Valkyrie, or simply Val, she reluctantly addresses the bureaucracy of being New Asgard's king before joining Thor, Korg, and Jane Foster in thwarting Gorr's plot to kill all gods.
- Valkyrie makes a cameo appearance in The Marvels. She is called by Carol Danvers to take the Skrulls to safety.
- An alternate universe variant of Valkyrie appears in Marvel Zombies, voiced again by Thompson. She appears in the last 2 episodes, welcoming Shang-Chi and Kamala Khan's group after interacting with Khonshu and teaming up with them to deal with the zombified Scarlet Witch and her zombie army.

=== Video games ===
- The Brunnhilde version of Valkyrie appears as an NPC in Marvel: Ultimate Alliance, voiced by Nika Futterman. While attempting to open the Bifrost, Valkyrie asks the heroes to recover her sword Dragonfang. If they succeed, Asgard will easily be freed with her aid, Loki will be imprisoned in chains, and Ragnarok never comes to pass. If not, Valkyrie will fall in the battle to free Asgard, Balder will die trying to save her, and Asgard will refuse contact with Earth for a century.
- The Brunnhilde version of Valkyrie appears as a playable character in Marvel Super Hero Squad Online, voiced by Grey DeLisle.
- The Brunnhilde version of Valkyrie appears as an unlockable character in Marvel: Avengers Alliance.
- The Brunnhilde version of Valkyrie appears in Marvel Heroes, voiced by Michelle Arthur.
- The Brunnhilde version of Valkyrie appears as a playable character in Lego Marvel's Avengers, voiced by Mary Elizabeth McGlynn.
- The MCU incarnation of Valkyrie appears as a playable character in Lego Marvel Super Heroes 2.
- A teenage Valkyrie based on the MCU incarnation appears in Marvel Avengers Academy.
- The MCU incarnation of Valkyrie appears in Marvel Puzzle Quest.
- The Brunnhilde version of Valkyrie appears in Marvel Ultimate Alliance 3: The Black Order, voiced again by Mary Elizabeth McGlynn.
- The Brunnhilde version of Valkyrie appears in Marvel Future Revolution, voiced again by Mary Elizabeth McGlynn.
- The Brunnhilde version of Valkyrie appears in Marvel Snap.
