= Eitri (character) =

Marvel Comics character

Publication information
- Publisher: Marvel Comics
- First appearance: The Mighty Thor Annual #11 (November 1983)
- Created by: Alan Zelenetz; Bob Hall

In-story information
- Species: Dwarf
- Team affiliations: Asgard
- Supporting character of: Thor; New Mutants
- Notable aliases: Dwarf King; King Eitri
- Abilities: Expert weapons forger Extended lifespan

Eitri is a fictional character appearing in American comic books published by Marvel Comics. Eitri is a Dwarf who lives on Svartalfheim and is the King of the Dwarves. He is a weapons forger and is notable for being the creator of Thor's hammer Mjolnir. Eitri has also occasionally aided the New Mutants.

Peter Dinklage portrayed the character in the Marvel Cinematic Universe film Avengers: Infinity War (2018).

== Publication history ==
Eitri was created by writer Alan Zelenetz and artist Bob Hall and first appeared in Thor Annual #11 (November 1983). He continued to appear throughout the '80s in the pages of the New Mutants, starting with The New Mutants Special Edition from writer Chris Claremont and artist Arthur Adams.

Following a long absence, Eitri returned in Thor vol. 2 #80 from Michael Avon Oeming, Daniel Berman and Andrea Di Vito.

== Fictional character biography ==
Eitri is the king of the Dwarves of Nidavellir. In his first appearance, he and his brother Brokk are tasked with creating a spear for Odin. Due to a young Loki's magic, the spear is cursed and Thor is asked to have the dwarves create a new weapon. Loki once again attempts to thwart the dwarves' forging, but they manage to complete the creation of Mjolnir.

Due to Loki's magic, Storm and her team were transported to Asgard and are separated. Cannonball encounters Eitri in a cave and rescues his family from Throff the Terrible, but is severely injured in the process. For this, Eitri brings him into his home and allows him to heal there, and Eitri's daughter Kindra strikes up a flirtatious relationship with Cannonball. Not long after, Eitri aids Cannonball in fending off Magma, who is possessed by Dark Elves. After helping her, Loki arrives and threatens Eitri and his kingdom. In response, he uses his magic to help Cannonball and Magma find their friends. Eitri gives Cannonball enchanted armor and a sword as well as a special hammer to give to Loki to expose him.

The New Mutants return to Asgard due to magical influence upon one of them. The dwarves initially mistake them for spies. However, Eitri frees the team and happily greets Cannonball and his friends. They are soon attacked by the Valkyrior, who are controlled by Hela. Eitri leads his Dwarves into battle after Boom Boom insults them. Eitri is captured by Hela and forces him to forge a sword out of the uru metal by threatening the life of his daughter Kindra. He comforts her by acknowledging the New Mutants' plan of action as well as his own in which the sword has "sown the seeds of Hela's destruction". Eitri frees himself, Kindra, and many of Asgard's warriors from prison and then reveals that he built a flaw in the sword. He has Kindra flee and then strikes the sword, allowing Cannonball to see the flaw and destroy it. Eitri's efforts, along with those of many other Asgardians and the New Mutants, save Odin from death.

In Thor (vol. 6), Eitri is killed by the God of Hammers during his attack on Nidavellir.

== Powers and abilities ==
Eitri is an expert weaponsmith. He also has an extended lifespan.

== In other media ==
=== Television ===
- Eitri appears in The Avengers: Earth's Mightiest Heroes, voiced by John DiMaggio.
- Eitri appears in the Ultimate Spider-Man episode "Field Trip", voiced by Troy Baker.

=== Marvel Cinematic Universe ===
Eitri appears in media set in the Marvel Cinematic Universe, portrayed by Peter Dinklage. This version is depicted at a giant's size.

- First appearing in Avengers: Infinity War (2018), Thor, Rocket, and Groot recruit Eitri to create Stormbreaker, a weapon capable of killing Thanos. He reveals that Thanos previously forced him to make the Infinity Gauntlet before massacring the dwarves and encasing his hands in metal to prevent him from forging again.
- An alternate timeline version of Eitri makes a cameo appearance in the What If...? (2021) episode "What If... the Watcher Broke His Oath?". He assists Gamora and Tony Stark in making a device that would help destroy the Infinity Gauntlet after they kill Thanos.
- Eitri was intended to appear in Thor: Love and Thunder (2022), but his scenes were cut.

=== Video games ===
Eitri appears in Marvel Snap.
