= Enchantress (Marvel Comics) =

Marvel Comics fictional character

- Amora, the original Enchantress, on the cover of Thor: Son of Asgard #8. Art by Jo Chen.

Publication information
- Publisher: Marvel Comics
- First appearance: Journey into Mystery #103 (April 1964)
- Created by: Stan Lee; Jack Kirby

In-story information
- Alter ego: Amora
- Species: Asgardian
- Team affiliations: Asgard; Masters of Evil; Lady Liberators; Mandarin's Minions; Sisterhood of Mutants; Astonishing Avengers; Lethal Legion
- Partnerships: Thor; Loki; Executioner
- Notable aliases: Christine Collins; Helen Eve; Amora Incantare; Amora Lorelei; Leena Moran; Valkyrie
- Abilities: Superhuman strength, stamina, durability, speed, agility, reflexes, healing, and longevity; Expertise in mysticism and seduction

Enchantress is the common primary alias of two fictional characters appearing in American comic books published by Marvel Comics. The first of these is a powerful sorceress by the name of Amora, depicted as one of Thor's greatest enemies. The second Enchantress is Sylvie Lushton, who was given great mystic powers by Loki when he created her as a tool for chaos. She models herself after the original Enchantress, Amora.

In animation, Kari Wahlgren, Fryda Wolff, and Grey DeLisle have voiced the Enchantress in various media. In the Marvel Cinematic Universe (MCU), Sophia Di Martino portrays a different version of the character called Sylvie, a variant of Loki, in the Disney+ series Loki.

== Publication history ==
Amora's first appearance in the Marvel Universe took place in Journey into Mystery #103 (April 1964), where she tried and failed to seduce Thor away from Jane Foster.

The second Enchantress, Sylvie, first appeared in Dark Reign: Young Avengers #1 (July 2009), where she was confronted by the Young Avengers.

== Fictional character biography ==
=== Amora ===
The Enchantress' parentage is unknown, though it is known she was born in Asgard and has a sister by the name of Lorelei. Amora began learning magic as an apprentice of Karnilla, Queen of the Norns, but was eventually banished. She continued learning magic on her own, notably by seducing others well versed in magic and learning their secrets. In time, Amora became one of the more powerful magic-wielders in Asgard, with her magical arsenal focused on (but not limited to) charming and mind-controlling people. Her by-then well-renowned beauty did not hinder in this.

In her first appearance, Odin sends the Enchantress to eliminate Jane Foster, whom Odin sees as a distraction. She also hopes to have the thunder god for herself. She is assisted by a powerful minion — Skurge, the Executioner. The Executioner loved the Enchantress, and she strings him along with her feminine wiles, using him as her muscle. She aids Loki by attempting to seduce Thor in his Don Blake identity and by sending the Executioner to kill Jane. Although the Executioner traps Foster in another dimension, Thor is able to bring her back by giving Skurge his hammer. When the Enchantress begins to turn Skurge into a tree, he releases Thor from the pact in exchange for his help. Amora then tries to change Thor's hammer into a serpent, but it is immune to her magic. Thor then transports the two back to Asgard.

The Enchantress and the Executioner are exiled to Earth by Odin. They become members of Heinrich Zemo's original Masters of Evil, the opposite number to the Avengers, a superhero team that Thor had joined. The Enchantress hypnotizes Thor into attacking the other Avengers with her own spells and a special brew, making him believe they are enemies of humanity, but Iron Man wakes Thor from his trance by reflecting sunlight into his eyes. Thor sends the Masters to another dimension through a space warp, but two issues later, the Enchantress uses a spell to send them back to Earth. She recruits Wonder Man into the Masters of Evil after paying his bail. She also meets Immortus, who helps Zemo attack the Avengers. When this attempt fails, she turns back time to prevent it from happening, though the Masters retain their memories of this event. When Immortus begins to contact the Masters, the Enchantress prevents this from happening. She then joins in the Masters of Evil's final assault against the Avengers and breaks Black Knight and Melter out of jail. She manages to escape in the end with the Executioner when the other two are transported to another dimension where their weapons rebound due to different scientific laws. As a member of the Masters of Evil, the Enchantress (and Executioner) repeatedly face the Avengers. She is especially affronted by the attempts of the Scarlet Witch, a mortal, to subvert her divine spells, though she is occasionally genuinely challenged by Scarlet Witch's mutant gifts.

Enchantress used the deceased Zemo's equipment to make a henchman of his, Erik Josten, into the original Power Man, who aids her in battling the Avengers. Her illusions and traps turn the city against the Avengers, forcing them to disband and making Power Man seem like a hero. Captain America, in disguise, corrects this by obtaining a taped confession from the Enchantress and Power Man. Power Man is able to defeat him, but the Enchantress is knocked out by gas from Hawkeye's arrow. Realizing the tape is on its way to the police, the Enchantress used her spells to teleport away. The Enchantress is then recruited by the Mandarin, along with the Executioner, Swordsman, and Living Laser for his plan for world domination. With the Executioner, she attacked the Asian sub-continent with an army of trolls, but they were defeated by Hercules and the Scarlet Witch.

Amora poses as the Valkyrie and forms the Lady Liberators, which battle the male Avengers. She dupes Arkon into fighting the Avengers. Amora also uses her magics to make Samantha Parrington and later Barbara Norris into the Valkyrie. With the Executioner, she battles the Defenders and the Thing.

During the "Secret Wars," she is placed on the villains's side, but she spurns the idea of fighting a gladiatorial game for the amusement of a higher being. She instead proposes to Thor that the two of them simply join forces, leave both heroes and villains behind, and go back home to Asgard.

On the appearance of Amora's sister Lorelei, it is established that the two sisters have something of a strained relationship, rooted in rivalry. More than a little friction is seen between the pair, not the least due to competition over which one of them would manage to seduce Thor.

The Enchantress joined the Asgardian gods and heroes in final battle against the world-ender Surtur. She establishes that she is motivated by enlightened self-interest: Surtur seeks to end the world, in which case Amora would perish.

Another regular foe of Amora's is the Scarlet Witch, as seen here in The Vision and the Scarlet Witch vol. 2 #9. Cover art by Richard Howell and P. Craig Russell.

Soon after the Surtur War, Thor leads a number of Asgardian heroes to Hel, the realm of the death goddess Hela. The Executioner asks Thor to let him join the expedition for reasons he does not immediately reveal. In truth, he had seen the Enchantress dallying with Heimdall, and, heartbroken, Skurge wishes to lose himself in a noble cause — such as rescuing lost souls from Hela. Thor's forces accomplish their mission but need one man to guard their retreat from Hel by holding the bridge Gjallarbrú. The Executioner, knowing there was no more Amora for him, chooses to be that man, giving his life so the others might flee. When Amora hears the news, to everyone's surprise, she is truly grief-stricken.

After Skurge's death, Amora continues her regular tricks, both helping Asgard and opposing it on occasion. She aids Asgard against the evil Egyptian god Seth's legions.

Lorelei later perishes as Amora refused to give her life for her sister's. The deceased Skurge (in Valhalla) rejects the Enchantress, and Amora goes on to empower the Earthman Brute Benhurst into a short-lived new Executioner to serve as her minion in Skurge's stead. Amora becomes vexed with the Avenger Wonder Man and assists Thor and the Warriors Three in their quest to return Odin to the throne of Asgard. During this time, an attraction between Amora and Asgard's guardian Heimdall is explored. Amora even battles the powerful entity Nightmare on behalf of both of them as Heimdall was unable to protect himself at the time. She ultimately rejects Heimdall when she realizes that he wishes to be married and she does not.

Later, Thor has been spurned by his father Odin, exiled to Earth and disempowered. In this vulnerable state, Thor ends up forming a willing liaison with Amora, with the two of them living out of a loft in New York City as lovers. This status quo would remain until Thor goes missing during Heroes Reborn and is presumed dead.

During Ragnarök, Amora is present with the other Asgardian deities and dwarves when Eitri and his brothers are sealed into a tomb they had carved due to the Mjolnir mold destroying them, albeit accidentally. When Surtur's forging of new Mjolnirs creates chaos, Thor attempts to fly to the skies to discern the source, but is at once struck down by a blast from a Mjolnir duplicate of Loki's; Amora is slain by the same blast, one of the first victims of Loki during this event. Neither her magic nor her inherent durability is capable of shielding her. Heimdall falls soon afterward; Amora is not seen again except, seemingly, in one of the realms of death, unable to use her magic to assist her once-lover.

After Ragnarök, when Thor, Asgard and the other Asgardians return, Thor is manipulated by Loki into inadvertently awakening some of Thor's enemies, among them Amora, though when she was last seen, she is the victim, falling by Loki's hands and mourned by Thor and the other Asgardians. She does not return to Asgard but instead goes to attack the world tree Yggdrasil to resurrect Skurge and release him from Valhalla. Amora is ultimately thwarted after Thor, Loki, and Balder convince her that she is dishonoring his memory with her actions.

She has returned after Thor's resurrection, with Donald Blake - bitter about his separation from Thor and his non-existent past - offering the Enchantress his soul if she can make him a god again. The resulting god is a twisted abomination, with Thor defeating the Enchantress and her new god before banishing them from Asgard, leaving Blake - reduced to a living head after his body was consumed to create the god - connected to a series of dream-weaving creatures to make him dream that he is living a full life.

After this Amora was defeated by Thor and banished to the forest in Norway. She was trapped in an Odinforce barrier and stripped of her powers. Lady Deathstrike and Typhoid Mary were on a quest to find Arkea, a gestalt microorganism capable of controlling machines and people. They found Amora and offered to help her regain her powers. In exchange they founded a new sisterhood to battle the X-Men, who were hunting Arkea and Deathstrike. Arkea hacked the Odinforce spell and restored Amora's full powers. In exchange for this, Amora restored the physical form of the immortal mutant witch, Selene, and helped Arkea resurrect Madelyne Pryor. Before the Sisterhood could add more members, the X-Men attacked and killed Arkea. Amora was ambushed by the X-Man M, who defeated her in a surprise attack. However, Pryor swore to continue the Sisterhood, which presently has Pryor, Selene, Deathstrike, Amora, and Mary as members.

During the "AXIS" storyline, Enchantress appears as a member of Magneto's unnamed supervillain group during the fight against Red Skull's Red Onslaught form. After the heroes and villains present at the battle experience a moral inversion due to the Scarlet Witch and Doctor Doom's attempt to bring out the Xavier in Onslaught backfiring, Magneto recruits Enchantress as one of his new 'Avengers' to stop the now-villainous Avengers and X-Men.

Following the "Secret Wars" storyline, she has become a member of Malekith's Dark Council. Through a spell, she takes control of the queen of the Light Elves, allowing her marriage to Malekith to happen and the conquest of their realm.

=== Sylvie Lushton ===
Enchantress
- Enchantress; Art by Mark Brooks

Publication information
- Publisher: Marvel Comics
- First appearance: Dark Reign: Young Avengers #1 (July 2009)
- Created by: Paul Cornell; Mark Brooks

In-story information
- Alter ego: Sylvie Lushton
- Species: Human
- Team affiliations: Young Masters; Young Avengers; Illuminati
- Abilities: Expertise in mysticism

A member of the Young Masters surfaces having modeled herself on Amora the Enchantress and takes on her teammate Melter as her lover. The new Enchantress is revealed to be an adolescent who had been given powers by Loki so that he could use her in his schemes. However, she truly believes that she is an Asgardian that had been exiled from Asgard and sent to live in New York where she joined the Young Masters. She admits to the first team of Young Avengers that she is Sylvie Lushton from Broxton, Oklahoma, who suddenly gained magic powers. Sylvie seems to have powers and abilities similar to those of the original Enchantress, despite looking far younger, and speaking with a noticeable lisp. Sylvie has a strong desire to become a Young Avenger and even used her magic to change her teammates' minds so that they would want her on the team as well.

After a series of try-outs, Sylvie is initially accepted as a new addition to the Young Avengers. However, as a plan to end Sylvie's future with the Young Avengers, her teammates Big Zero and Egghead download the results of an analysis they had run on her into Vision's cybernetic mind. The analysis verifies that Sylvie is an unwitting trap for the Young Avengers' magical defense systems created by Loki and Wiccan immediately has her banned from the Young Avengers' hideout. A distraught and confused Sylvie then asks her teammates to avenge her, eventually resulting in a confrontation between the two teams and Norman Osborn's team of Dark Avengers. During the conflict, Wiccan reveals to her that she was given magical powers by Loki. However, he states that the team still wants her, but that her hasty banning was only to quickly remove her from the premises so that he could alter the magical defenses to compensate for Loki's traps. Convinced by Wiccan that being an Avenger is about who one chooses to be despite one's origins, she, Coat of Arms, and Wiccan manage to magically remove the Sentry from the battlefield and turn the tide of the fight against the Young Masters and the Dark Avengers. Melter requests a quick escape so that they can have more time to decide what they will choose to do as either superheroes or supervillains, and Sylvie complies, teleporting the Young Masters away.

Enchantress later joins the Hood's incarnation of the Illuminati. She is confronted by the original Enchantress, who banishes her to a hostile realm.

== Powers and abilities ==
The Enchantress is a member of the race of superhumans known as Asgardians, and as such possesses superhuman strength, speed, stamina, and durability but prefers to avoid physical conflicts. She possesses an innate capacity to manipulate ambient magical energy, honed through practice for a variety of effects, including projecting energy bolts, interdimensional teleportation of multiple Asgardians and non-Asgardians, protective energy barriers, illusion casting, levitation, conjuration, transmutation (even of Asgardians), telekinesis, time-disruption, mind switching, and mind control. She has used her sorcery to enhance her natural beauty and allure, and to enchant her lips so that by kissing virtually any man she can make him her slave for about a week, unless she renews the treatment. She can also use her magic to heal any of her injuries rapidly, and possesses limited mystical senses. She can also absorb an opponent's life force to temporarily increase her own powers. A prolonged absence from Asgard tends to diminish her powers although they never fade completely. The Enchantress has been described as one of the most powerful sorceresses in Asgard. However, Amora's sister Lorelei was later also enhanced beyond her own abilities. The Enchantress has a gifted intellect, and possesses extensive knowledge of Asgardian mystic and amatory arts. On occasion, the Enchantress employs various mystical artifacts, potions, and power objects, such as the crystalline gem in which she entrapped Brunnhilde the Valkyrie's soul, and the potion she used to increase her hypnotic power over Thor in The Avengers #7. It has been shown that Enchantress is unable to access her spells when her hands are bound and her mouth is gagged.

Initially unbeknownst to her, Enchantress II's powers are given to her by Loki. Wiccan states that she may not fully understand how powerful she truly is. Her powers and abilities appear similar to those of the original Enchantress. She is able to teleport many people instantly, maintain a secret fortress with her magic, and transform objects and people into whatever she desires, such as turning several henchmen into frogs. She also demonstrated power enough to stop both the Young Avengers and Young Masters during their battle and separate them.

== Connection to Norse mythology ==
Unlike many of Marvel's Asgardians, Amora is not based on a goddess from Norse mythology. In the limited series Thor: Ages of Thunder the Enchantress is said to have been referred to by many names throughout history including; Freyja, Gefn and Iduna, and is linked to many of the myths associated with these goddesses (e.g. as keeper of the golden apples). However, these stories were set during previous cycles of Ragnarok and characters based on some of these goddesses (Freya and Idunn) exist separately in the current Marvel Universe.

== Reception ==
=== Critical reception ===
Drew Atchison of Screen Rant referred to the Enchantress as one of the "best Thor villains from the comics," writing, "Magic is used a lot in comics. Many use it for good but some like Amora the Enchantress, use it for far more villainous and vile reasons. A powerful Asgardian witch, Amora has cast powerful spells over Thor, Asgard, and other characters, making herself an iconic foe that the thunderer always seems to face at some point." Sara Century of Syfy called the Enchantress a "feminist dreambae," saying, "Amora the Enchantress first showed up way back in Journey Into Mystery #103 (1964), and she's been punking most of the Marvel Universe ever since. Amora arrived on the scene to assist Loki in taking Thor down, and their inevitable failure kicked off a long and storied career for her as a bae with a dark side. As one of mainstream comics' few female characters fully in control of her own sexual agency, and one of the Thor series' most sympathetic villains, Amora hasn't always been written perfectly, but she's definitely always been an object of our affections. Being bae is quite literally her superpower." Jesse Schedeen and Joshua Yehl of IGN said, "Thor is happy to battle Frost Giants, Fire Demons, and dragons all day long -- if it can be smashed with a hammer, it's right up his alley. That's why The Enchantress is one of his greatest villains; her schemes can't be overcome simply by swinging at it with Mjolnir. A skilled trickster and sorceress, the Enchantress won't rest until she possesses everything she desires. And it just so happens that she desires the god of thunder."

Adjanni Ramos of CBR.com wrote, "Amora the Enchantress working alongside Loki in a plot against Thor is as classic as the Sinister Six fighting Spider-Man. Ever since early Thor comics, Amora and Loki have worked together because of a common goal to defeat the God of Thunder; although, in Amora's case, it's usually to make him fall for her. Some iterations of the duo have even depicted Amora as having feelings for Loki, but the two have always served as classic Thor-Villains Duo." Noah Bell of Collider stated, "The Enchantress, known as Amora, is a skilled sorceress and master manipulator. One of Thor's most iconic villains, a live-action depiction of the character seems long overdue at this point. With her focus on manipulation and mind games, Amora could be an interesting change of pace for villains in the Thor franchise. While Thor has gotten out of most situations with his strength, an encounter with the Enchantress could show more of the Asgardian's brains in action." Marc Buxton of Den of Geek asserted, "Amora was a founding member of the Masters of Evil and it is about time Marvel focus their energies on a worthy female adversary for their heroes. It can be argued that she is the greatest villainess in the Marvel Universe and it is time the world came under Amora's spell."

In addition, various websites have assessed Enchantress as among the best Marvel villains of all time, the strongest magic users in Marvel Comics, the best Thor enemies, the most powerful Asgardians, and the strongest female villains.

== Other versions ==
=== Heroes Reborn ===
An alternate universe version of the Enchantress appears in Heroes Reborn.

=== Marvel 2099 ===
An alternate universe version of the Enchantress from Earth-2099 appears in Marvel 2099 reality. This version is a member of the Masters of Evil.

=== Marvel Zombies ===
A zombified alternate universe version of the Enchantress from Earth-2149 appears in Marvel Zombies vs. The Army of Darkness.

=== Old Man Logan ===
An alternate universe version of the Enchantress from Earth-21923 appears in Old Man Logan.

=== Ultimate Marvel ===
An alternate universe version of the Enchantress from Earth-1610 appears in the Ultimate Marvel universe.

== In other media ==
=== Television ===
- Amora the Enchantress appears in The Marvel Super Heroes, voiced by Nonnie Griffin.
- Amora the Enchantress appears in The Super Hero Squad Show episode "Mental Organism Designed Only for Kisses!", voiced by Grey DeLisle.
- Amora the Enchantress appears in The Avengers: Earth's Mightiest Heroes, voiced by Kari Wahlgren. This version is a founding member of the Masters of Evil.
- Amora the Enchantress appears in Avengers Assemble, voiced by Fryda Wolff. This version is a member of the Cabal.
- Amora the Enchantress appears in Marvel Future Avengers, voiced by Ayumi Yonemaru in Japanese and Kari Wahlgren in English. This version is a member of the Masters of Evil.
- The Sylvie Lushton incarnation of the Enchantress serves as inspiration for the character Sylvie, portrayed by Sophia Di Martino in the Marvel Cinematic Universe (MCU) Disney+ television show Loki (2021–2023).

=== Film ===
- Amora the Enchantress appears in Hulk vs. Thor, voiced again by Kari Wahlgren.
- Amora the Enchantress appears in Thor: Tales of Asgard, voiced by Ashleigh Ball.

=== Video games ===
- Amora the Enchantress appears as a boss in Marvel: Ultimate Alliance, voiced by Gabrielle Carteris. This version is a lieutenant in Doctor Doom's Masters of Evil.
- Amora the Enchantress appears in Marvel Super Hero Squad Online, voiced by Grey DeLisle.
- Amora the Enchantress appears as a boss, later playable character, in Marvel: Avengers Alliance.
- A teenage version of Amora the Enchantress appears in Marvel Avengers Academy, voiced by Laura Bailey.
- Amora the Enchantress appears as a boss and playable character in Marvel Future Fight.
- Amora the Enchantress appears as a playable character in Lego Marvel's Avengers via the "Masters of Evil" DLC.

=== Merchandise ===
- The Enchantress received a figurine in The Classic Marvel Figurine Collection.
- The Enchantress received a figure in Hasbro's Marvel Universe line via the Secret Wars sub-line as part of a two-pack with Thor.
- The Enchantress received a figure in the Marvel Super Hero Squad line.
- The Enchantress received two figures in Hasbro's Marvel Legends line, with the first being released as part of the San Diego Comic-Con 2016 exclusive "The Raft" set.

=== Miscellaneous ===
- The Enchantress appears in the HeroClix miniatures game.
- The Enchantress has been announced for the Marvel Crisis Protocol miniatures game.
