= Desak =

Desak the God Slayer

Publication information
- Publisher: Marvel Comics
- First appearance: Thor Annual 2001
- Created by: Dan Jurgens

In-story information
- Full name: Desak Sterixian
- Partnerships: Designate/Spirit of the Jewel; Zarrko the Tomorrow Man
- Abilities: Superhuman strength, durability and endurance Flight; Teleportation; Energy projection through his eyes Ability to survive indefinitely in the void of space and sense all aspects of godliness Via Amulet of Power: Ability to absorb a god's life force and his power

Desak Sterixian, more commonly known as Desak the God Slayer, is a fictional character appearing in American comic books published by Marvel Comics. The character was created by Dan Jurgens and Tom Grummett and first appears in Thor Annual 2001. The character has been succeeded in his role as a killer of gods by the character Gorr the God Butcher, a more brutal character with a similar mission to kill gods, though the two are unrelated beyond this.

== Fictional character history ==
Desak comes from an unnamed world whose inhabitants worship a god called Kronnitt. Kronnitt demands the sacrifice of Desak's daughter. During the sacrifice of his daughter, an apparition visits Desak and offers him a magic gem that could save his daughter. Desak thinks he is hallucinating and refuses. When Kronnitt punishes Desak's people — despite the sacrifice — the apparition returns again and Desak accepts the gem. Empowered by the gem, and armed with a sword, axe, dagger, and shield, Desak confronts and kills Kronnitt. His course of action clear, Desak travels from world to world, slaying a pantheon of Dark Gods.

While hunting for two gods called Pennsu and Tae, Desak encounters Thor, Beta Ray Bill, and Hercules. When Pennsu and Tae attempt to destroy their own people, the heroes intervene, giving Desak time to slay them. After a terse verbal encounter with Thor, Desak departs.

Desak eventually slaughters all but two of the Dark Gods — the Asgardians' old enemies. Only Perrikus and Adva escape. Desak is then contacted by Zarrko, who warns him of the threat that Thor, now Lord of Asgard after the death of Odin, poses to Earth. After easily dispatching the villain Grey Gargoyle, Desak fights and almost kills Thor. Having absorbed the Odinforce after a futile attack by Thor, Desak is about to kill Thor when a fellow Asgardian, Thialfi, provides Thor with the Bloodaxe, which Thor uses to kill Desak.

Unknown to Thor, the apparition rescues Desak and allows him to heal in hiding. Desak returns many years after Thor has conquered the Earth, and kills many of Thor's closest Asgardian comrades. It is at this moment that the apparition is revealed to be Tarene, the Designate, who has traveled back in time to try to stop the future from occurring. Merging with the Destroyer, Desak becomes even more powerful, but faces an enlightened Thor. Thor hurls his hammer Mjolnir with such force that it decapitates the Destroyer, killing Desak instantly.

== Powers and abilities ==
Desak possessed superhuman strength, endurance, and durable stone-like skin. Desak had the ability to fly, teleport, shoot energy beams from his eyes, and survive indefinitely in the void of space. Using his amulet, he can absorb the life force and power of others.
