= Sif (character) =

Fictional character in Marvel Comics

- Sif on the cover of Thor: Son of Asgard #3. Art by Adi Granov.

Publication information
- Publisher: Marvel Comics
- First appearance: Journey into Mystery #102 (March 1964)
- Created by: Stan Lee (writer); Jack Kirby (artist)

In-story information
- Full name: Sif
- Species: Asgardian
- Place of origin: Asgard
- Team affiliations: Asgard
- Partnerships: Thor
- Notable aliases: Fair One; Rose Chambers; Sylvan; Sybil; Sif the All-Seeing
- Abilities: Superhuman strength, speed, agility, stamina, durability, reflexes, and longevity; Regenerative healing factor; Teleportation; Proficient use of cold weapons; Skilled hand-to-hand combat

Sif is a character appearing in American comic books published by Marvel Comics. Created by Stan Lee and Jack Kirby, the character first appeared in Journey into Mystery #102 (March 1964). She is based on the Norse goddess Sif. As an Asgardian warrior and lover of Thor, Sif often accompanies him into battle. She has also battled alongside Balder, who has developed an unrequited attraction to her, as she never shows affection for anyone but Thor and certain individuals who have proved worthy to wield his hammer, Mjolnir, such as the noble alien warrior Beta Ray Bill, and the mortal Eric Masterson.

Sif has appeared in various media adaptations of Thor. Jaimie Alexander portrays Lady Sif in the Marvel Cinematic Universe films Thor (2011), Thor: The Dark World (2013), and Thor: Love and Thunder (2022), as well as the first and second seasons of the television series Agents of S.H.I.E.L.D. and one episode of the first season of the television series Loki. Additionally, alternate timeline versions of Sif appear in two episodes of the Disney+ animated series What If...?.

== Publication history ==
Created by Stan Lee and Jack Kirby, Sif first appeared in Journey into Mystery #102 (March 1964). As a supporting character of Thor, she was featured predominantly in the pages of The Mighty Thor, beginning with issue #136 (January 1967). The character went on to make guest appearances in several series including The Avengers, Fantastic Four, The New Mutants, Silver Surfer and Thunderstrike.

In June 2010, Sif starred in a self-titled one-shot by writer Kelly Sue DeConnick and artist Ryan Stegman. The issue deals with the aftermath of Loki having taken control of her body and her consciousness being forced into the frame of a dying elderly woman. DeConnick said, "Well, this is pretty much the story of how she deals with that. She was a bit cowed at first and, for a woman as fierce and proud as Sif, that's insult added to injury. This is the story of how she comes to own that fury and rises to her full stature once again."

Beginning with issue #646 (November 2012), Journey into Mystery by Kathryn Immonen and Valerio Schiti shifted focus from Loki to Sif. Editor Lauren Sankovitch said, "We had it Loki-centric... going forward with #646 we wanted to mix it up a little bit. Sif's been in the thick of it, she's a born warrior, she's got a lot of fight and verve and fire to her! We talked at length about what this story could be and what her story could be, and it all came down to ... one single question: what does she want? I think Sif, above all, wants to be a better warrior." The series was cancelled in August 2013 with issue #655. About the cancellation, Immonen said

We are done with 655. But seeing as we were basically cooked right out of the gate, I'm going to call hanging in for nearly a year a success. To be truthful, the real challenge that we inherited with this book was living up to the beautiful work that Kieron [Gillen] et al. had done previously and the amazing reader energy that had been generated. If all that had happened with our ten issues was to extend the influence of the astonishing Valerio Schiti, that would have been enough. As it is, I'm so proud of what Valerio, Jordie [Bellaire], Clayton [Cowles], Pepe and I put on the page under Lauren [Sankovitch] and Jake's fearless leadership. I'm also thrilled to have been able to write Sif as a fierce warrior and a lovable dork. I hope she finds a new home somewhere with a lot of things to say and a lot of things to kill.

== Fictional character biography ==
=== Early life ===
Sif, Heimdall's sister, has been Thor and Balder's constant companion since childhood. Like most Asgardians, Sif was born with golden hair. Hers was turned black after Loki cut it and replaced it with enchanted hair made by dwarves. At an early age she showed great prowess as a warrior and was considered the best female warrior in all of Asgard, matched only by Brunnhilde. At one point a giant gave her to the death goddess Hela in exchange for immortality, but Thor saved her by offering himself in her place. Hela was so impressed that she let them both go.

Sif was originally said to be Balder's sister rather than Heimdall's in her first appearance.

=== Life as a warrior ===
Sif and Thor are separated when his father Odin banishes Thor from Asgard and Thor begins a life as a superhero on Earth. Many years later Thor becomes romantically involved with Jane Foster. Thor brings Jane to Asgard to be wed and she is granted immortality but fails a final test. Odin sends her back to Earth, stripped of her newly acquired powers and without memories of the event. Odin then arranges an encounter with Sif while Thor is battling the monstrous super-strong Unknown and the two fall in love again.

Reunited with Thor, Sif accompanies him into battle against many of his most formidable enemies including Ulik, the Enchanters Three, the Circus of Crime, Wrecker, Mangog, Pluto, and Surtur. Sif is part of the resistance when Loki takes control of Asgard. After Hogun attempts a physical attack, Sif puts herself in the line of fire and convinces Loki if he dies, he would have to kill her too. Loki declines to murder anyone at that point. Sif is one of the Asgardians who encounter Tana Nile, leading to a series of adventures with her that gets them exiled from Asgard for a time, but they eventually return home. Sif discovers that Thor still has feelings for Jane Foster when she finds him at her hospital bedside after Jane has been critically injured. Despite this, Sif chooses to save Jane's life by merging her life force with her own. Sif does this partially to try to understand Thor's attraction to mortals, especially Jane. Sif is soon separated from Jane, and Jane is exiled to a pocket dimension only accessible through the Possessor's runestaff. Eventually, Sif and Thor rescue Jane and reunite her with her mortal love, Dr. Kevin Kincaid. Red Norvell, who is attracted to Sif, kidnaps her when he gains Thor's power (thanks to Loki). She convinces him to return and save Asgard from Ragnarök. Later, she breaks a deadlock of votes, allowing Thor to return to Earth.

Later, the alien warrior Beta Ray Bill comes to the defense of Earth during a war with Surtur and his demon army. In the midst of battle Sif and Bill find themselves attracted to each other. Meanwhile, Lorelei has given Thor an elixir that causes him to fall in love with her, and he is so blinded by the spell that he strikes Sif in anger. When the war is over, Sif and Bill spend some time on Earth exploring their mutual attraction before returning to Asgard. Sif eventually returns and finally comes to forgive Thor after she realizes that Lorelei was to blame for his brutality. However, she clarifies to Balder that her love for Bill is purely platonic.

She also develops a romantic relationship with another mortal to wield Thor's power, Eric Masterson. Despite this, Sif risks her life to travel to the realm of Mephisto to free what seems to be the soul of Thor from a mystical bag, pledging her loyalty to the demonic entity. She is manipulated into a new costume change and is sent to face down Eric and Balder in battle, who had willingly followed her, worried for the success of her mission. Eric and Sif eventually part realms as friends, but he leaves her with a favored leather jacket.

=== Thor's reign ===
When Thor assumes the throne of Asgard following Odin's death, he becomes torn between his duties as king and his desire to keep mortals from harm. Thor resolves this by bringing Asgard to Earth and reshaping the world in his image. Though his intentions are noble, a nightmarish future follows as Thor's reign on Earth becomes tyrannical. Sif, unwilling to go along with this new vision, is exiled from Asgard. Thor eventually marries the Enchantress and has a son, Magni. As an adult seeking understanding of these events, Magni finds Sif, who influences him to rise up against his father even though she still loves him. Following Magni's death in a battle involving Thor, Thor Girl and Desak, Thor sees the error of his ways and travels back in time to undo what he has done.

After the timeline is reset, Loki brings about Ragnarök in Asgard, during which the godly forces swiftly lose ground. Sif survives the first wave of losses but loses an arm. She is rescued by Brunnhilde, who is later killed by Durok the Demolisher. Sif honors Brunnhilde's death by taking her sword and leading the Valkyrior in the final battle. Sif falls in battle against Surtur's forces, dying side by side with Volstagg. All of Asgard falls soon after.

=== Reborn ===
Thor returns in time and restores the Asgardian pantheon, beginning with Heimdall. After resurrecting the other gods, Donald Blake goes to a hospital to try to find the reborn Sif. After wrongly thinking that she was reborn in Donald Blake's former love Jane Foster, he leaves thinking that Sif won't come back. However, that scene reveals that Sif was reborn in an elderly woman in that hospital named Mrs. Chambers, who is suffering from what is thought to be terminal cancer. Loki has masked her from Thor's abilities, giving her a mirror that shows Sif her true form but prevents her from revealing her identity. Her host remains in the hospital, fighting for her life. Thor wondered what would happen to the spirit of an Asgardian if their host died.

During the "Dark Reign" storyline, Loki later reveals to Thor what happened to Sif and advises him to find her before Loki returns to his true form. Upon learning the truth from Mrs. Chambers, Jane Foster calls Donald Blake and informs him that she has found Sif, and Thor succeeds in restoring her. With Sif resurrected, Mrs. Chambers passes away. Sif then joins Thor in exile in Broxton, Oklahoma and checks into the same hotel as Donald Blake under the name Sylvan. While in Broxton, Sif struggles with the fact that Loki possessed her body while she was trapped in Mrs. Chambers' body. She aids Beta Ray Bill, whose starship Skuttlebutt has been invaded by virus-infected aliens. Sif is later seen defending Asgard during the Siege of Asgard and the Serpent's War.

== Powers and abilities ==
Sif shares powers common among all Asgardians, with her dense physiology granting superhuman strength greater than the average Asgardian female and on par with the average Asgardian male, limited invulnerability, as well as advanced stamina, speed, agility, and reflexes. Sif is also extremely long lived and maintains her youth and vitality through the consumption of golden apples. She is also highly skilled in hand to hand combat and proficient in the use of cold weapons, favoring a sword and shield in battle. She is often said to be the best female fighter in Asgard, on par with Valkyrie.

In early appearances, Sif also possessed the innate ability to teleport herself and others from Earth to Asgard. At some point, Sif began relying on her enchanted sword, which could "cleave" open gateways to other destinations besides Earth and Asgard through a complex array of swinging motions. However, during The Reigning, after Thor failed to truly resurrect a young girl, Sif was once again able to teleport herself and Thor away without the use of her sword. Sif and Balder relied on the Norn Stones to teleport when they were looking for Thor.

== Reception ==
=== Accolades ===
- In 2020, Scary Mommy included Sif in their "Looking For A Role Model? These 195+ Marvel Female Characters Are Truly Heroic" list.
- In 2022, The Mary Sue ranked Sif 2nd in their "All of Thor’s Love Interests in Marvel Comics" list.
- in 2022, CBR.com ranked Sif 8th in their "10 Strongest Asgardians In The Comics" list.

== Other versions ==
=== Earth X ===
In the alternate Earth X reality, the Asgardians were actually aliens that were manipulated by the Celestials into believing they were the Gods of Norse myth. When the lie was revealed, "Sif" and the other Asgardians briefly resumed their alien form, but later returned to their Asgardian forms.

=== Guardians of the Galaxy ===
In the Guardians of the Galaxy timeline, by the 31st century Thor and Sif have a son named Woden Thorson.

=== MC2 ===
Sif has an alternate, older, version of herself living in the MC2 universe. This version had to flee from her home world on Asgard when the planet devourer Galactus arrived to eat it, as seen in the Last Planet Standing miniseries.

=== Mutant X ===
In the Mutant X universe, Sif was one of many who fought the Beyonder and died.

=== Ultimate Universe ===
An alternate universe version of Sif from Earth-6160 appears in the Ultimate Universe. This version is a servant of Loki who later becomes a member of the Ultimates.

== In other media ==
=== Television ===
- Sif appears in The Super Hero Squad Show episode "Oh Brother!", voiced by Tricia Helfer.
- Sif appears in The Avengers: Earth's Mightiest Heroes, voiced by Nika Futterman.

=== Film ===
- Sif appears in Hulk vs. Thor, voiced by Grey DeLisle.
- Sif appears in Thor: Tales of Asgard, voiced by Tara Strong.
- Sif makes a non-speaking cameo appearance in The Good, the Bart, and the Loki.

=== Marvel Cinematic Universe ===
Jaimie Alexander as Sif in the 2011 film Thor.

Sif appears in media set in the Marvel Cinematic Universe (MCU), portrayed by Jaimie Alexander.

- Sif first appears in Thor, and its sequel Thor: The Dark World.
- Sif appears in Agents of S.H.I.E.L.D.
- While Sif is absent from Thor: Ragnarok due to Alexander being busy with Blindspot, Marvel producer Kevin Feige stated that Sif survived Hela's attack on Asgard. In a sequence where Asgardian actors perform a play based on the events of The Dark World, the actress portraying Sif is portrayed by Charlotte Nicdao.
- While Sif does not appear in Avengers: Infinity War, co-director Joe Russo confirmed that she was killed by Thanos during the Blip.
- Sif appears in a flashback in the Loki episode "The Nexus Event".
- Alternate timeline variants of Sif appear in What If...?, voiced by Alexander.
  - In "What If... the World Lost Its Mightiest Heroes?", Sif is among those who accompany Loki to Midgard to avenge Thor's death.
  - In "What If... Thor Were an Only Child?", Sif and the Warriors Three accompany Thor to Midgard for a party.
- Sif appears in Thor: Love and Thunder. She battles Gorr, only to lose an arm to him and later move to New Asgard to become a combat trainer.

=== Video games ===
- Sif appears as a non-playable character in Marvel: Ultimate Alliance, voiced by Adrienne Barbeau.
- The MCU incarnation of Sif appears in Thor: God of Thunder, voiced by Jaimie Alexander.
- Sif appears as a playable character in Marvel: Avengers Alliance.
- Sif appears in Marvel Heroes, voiced by Amy Pemberton.
- Sif appears as a downloadable playable character in Lego Marvel Super Heroes, voiced by Tara Strong.
- The MCU incarnation of Sif appears in the Thor: The Dark World film tie-in game, voiced by Sarah Natochenny.
- Sif appears in Disney Infinity, voiced by Laura Bailey.
- Sif appears as a playable character in Marvel Avengers Alliance Tactics.
- Sif appears as a playable character in Marvel: Future Fight.
- Sif appears as a playable character in Lego Marvel's Avengers, voiced by Mary Elizabeth McGlynn.
- Sif appears as a playable character in Marvel Avengers Academy, voiced by Nika Futterman.
- Sif appears in Marvel Cosmic Invasion, voiced by Elysia Rotaru.

=== Miscellaneous ===
- Sif appears in Thor & Loki: Blood Brothers, voiced by Elizabeth Diennet.
- Sif appears in the Tales of Asgard novel trilogy, written by Keith R.A. DeCandido and published by Joe Books. She appears as the star of book two, Marvel's Sif: Even Dragons Have Their Endings (2016), and a supporting character in book one, Marvel's Thor: Dueling with Giants (2015), and book three, Marvel's Warriors Three: Godhood's End (2017).

== Collected editions ==
| Title | Material collected | Published date | ISBN |
|---|---|---|---|
| Journey into Mystery Featuring Sif - Volume 1: Stronger Than Monsters | Journey into Mystery #646–650 | June 2013 | 978-0785161080 |
| Journey into Mystery Featuring Sif - Volume 2: Seeds of Destruction | Journey into Mystery #651–655 | November 2013 | 978-0785184478 |
| Sif: Journey into Mystery - The Complete Collection | Sif #1 and Journey into Mystery #646–655 | September 2017 | 978-1302906832 |
