= Heimdall (character) =

Character in Marvel Comics

- Art by Olivier Coipel

Publication information
- Publisher: Marvel Comics
- First appearance: Journey into Mystery #85 (October 1962)
- Created by: Stan Lee (writer); Larry Lieber (writer); Jack Kirby (artist)

In-story information
- Species: Asgardian
- Place of origin: Asgard
- Notable aliases: Donald Velez, Ezra
- Abilities: Superhuman strength, endurance, and longevity; Supernatural hearing and vision; Teleportation

Heimdall (/ˈheɪmdɑːl/) is a fictional character appearing in American comic books published by Marvel Comics. The character is based on the Norse deity Heimdall. Heimdall is described as all-seeing and all-hearing and is the sole protector of the Bifröst in Asgard.

Idris Elba portrayed the character in the Marvel Cinematic Universe films Thor (2011), Thor: The Dark World (2013), Avengers: Age of Ultron (2015), Thor: Ragnarok (2017), Avengers: Infinity War (2018), and Thor: Love and Thunder (2022).

== Publication history ==
Heimdall first appeared in a comic in Journey into Mystery #85 (October 1962) and was created by Stan Lee, Larry Lieber and Jack Kirby.

== Fictional character biography ==
Heimdall is the brother of the warrior Sif. He is the all-seeing and all-hearing guardian sentry of Asgard who stands on the rainbow bridge Bifröst to watch for any attacks to Asgard. He partly won the role through using his eyesight to see an army of giants several days' march from Asgard, allowing them to be defeated before they reached Asgard, and making their king a prisoner. For ages, he stood as the guardian of Asgard, defending the city's gates from any intruders, and was one of the most trusted servants of Odin.

Later still, Heimdall battled Thor at Loki's command. In the prophecy of Ragnarok, he severed the Bifröst and sounded Gjallarhorn. He traveled to Earth with Kamorr the dwarf to search for human candidates for godhood. He gathered three such human beings, and arranged for them to be exposed to Ego-Prime's energies and become the first three Young Gods.

When Asgard was invaded by the fire demon Surtur, Heimdall attempted to defend the gates, but was overcome, and the Bifröst was shattered. No longer needing to be stationary, Heimdall spent more time in Asgard. Heimdall is given the Great Scepter of Odin to guard by Loki.

When Odin returned to Asgard after Surtur's defeat, he gave a portion of his power to Heimdall to restore the Bifröst, and Heimdall resumed his duties.

=== Seemingly betrayed ===
Shortly afterwards, when Odin was about to enter his Odinsleep, he gave the Odinpower to Heimdall so he could rule Asgard until he awoke. Heimdall had to deal with a major crisis in the life of Thor, as Thor had been banished into the subconscious of the mortal Eric Masterson, who had assumed Thor's responsibilities. Sif was determined to find the real Thor, and her determination drove a wedge between her and Heimdall. When Karnilla conspired with Loki to rule Asgard by having Odin awaken with Loki's soul possessing him, Heimdall was branded a traitor and banished to the Dream Dimension, ruled by the demon Nightmare. During this incident, his mind had been altered, leaving him little more than being able to follow directions. The Enchantress battles Nightmare in order to save him, ultimately rescuing them both. Eric Masterson helped restore Odin whose body had been taken over by Loki with Mephisto's help and later Thor as well from the soul shroud.

=== Loss and death ===
When Odin cast the Asgardians into the guises of mortals to protect them from a false Ragnarok, Heimdall became Donald Velez. He joined the other "Lost Gods" in attempting to rediscover who they were and battling the Egyptian death-god Seth. Heimdall and the others regained their true forms and defeated Seth as Asgard was attacked by the Dark Gods, and they were all taken prisoner. They were finally rescued by Thor.

Asgard is struck by another Ragnarok, caused by Loki making weapons like Mjolnir for his army and enlisting the aid of Surtur, one from which there was no seeming reversal. Heimdall perishes in battle defending his people. Many Asgardians, Heimdall included, reform as Earthly beings.

=== Rebirth ===
After Thor ends the cycle of Ragnarok, Thor restores Asgard in Broxton, Oklahoma. Heimdall, along with the other Asgardians, are reborn on Earth in bodies of mortal beings, and he is the first Asgardian to be found. Thor locates Heimdall in New Orleans in the body of a man on a bridge and restores him to his Asgardian form. Upon his return to Asgard, Heimdall uses his near-omniscient power to locate the scattered souls of the other Asgardians with the notable exception of his sister Sif, due to Loki's interference.

In Siege, Heimdall is one of the first targets to be taken out by Norman Osborn and his forces. Loki transports his bedchamber beneath Asgard so he cannot warn them of the attack. However Heimdall partially recovers, joins his comrades in battle and assists in defeating the invaders. Heimdall's duties and status are touched upon in the 'Avengers Prime' miniseries which takes place in the days following 'Siege'. At the conclusion, he is entrusted with the Twilight Sword, a weapon that could destroy the known worlds.

=== All-Mother ===
The rebuilding of Asgard comes with a new ruler, the All-Mother Frigga. She asks Heimdall to look into the future, where he sees unknown assassins attempting to kill her. He also manages to note something is wrong with the God of Thunder, Tanarus. Tanarus severely injures Heimdall, leaving him unable to protect the All-Mother and warn others of the mystery of his attacker.

Odin returns, and yet another carries Mjolnir, Jane Foster. When Odin sends the Serpent to bring down Jane on Bifröst itself, Heimdall fights back, knowing this would end with him imprisoned, as the former All-Mother is imprisoned under Odin's orders.

=== Blinded Heimdall ===
When Mangog attacked Asgard, his latest assault left Heimdall blind when the monster took Heimdall's sword and used it to gouge out his eyes. Heimdall was treated in time to save his life, but when the War of the Realms began, he was still blinded, with the result that Daredevil took over his duties for a brief period as he was better equipped to 'see' while blind, until his eyes recovered.

=== Death ===
With his eyesight restored, Heimdall traveled to Midgard to help Jane Foster - the new Valkyrie - find the lost sword Dragonfang before being stabbed in the chest by Bullseye. Although his wounds proved fatal, Heimdall helped Jane accept that she had to be her own kind of Valkyrie rather than hold on to their legacy. She subsequently takes Heimdall on a 'tour' of the multiversal afterlife rather than taking him straight to Valhalla so that he could experience something truly new.

== Powers and abilities ==
Heimdall possesses the powers of a typical Asgardian, including superhuman strength, stamina, speed, agility and durability. However, he is generally stronger and more durable than all but a few Asgardians, such as Odin and Thor. Like all Asgardians his body is denser than a human's, contributing partly to his superhuman strength and weight.

Heimdall possesses acute senses, most notably his vision and hearing. His senses are said to be so acute that he can hear sap running through trees and plants growing, and see and hear anything occurring in Asgard or on Earth. Heimdall is able to sense the life essences of Asgardian gods throughout the Nine Worlds of Asgard, and has the ability to focus on certain sensory information or block it out of his consciousness as he chooses, being so alert that he requires no sleep at all. Certain magical spells can block his sensory powers. Additionally, his powers of sight are limited if even one of his eyes cannot see; apparently his eyes are capable of sustaining physical injury and require a long time to naturally heal, if ever. At least once, Heimdall has shown the ability to project an avatar (as an enlarged image of his face) to others from just outside Broxton to Manhattan, as he did with Thor, though he claims that he cannot maintain it for long, as his power has diminished with the fall of Asgard.

Heimdall also briefly possessed the Odinpower, which granted him the ability to channel vast magical energies for various purposes, such as repairing the Bifröst.

Heimdall is an experienced warrior and a fierce hand-to-hand combatant. He has proficiency and great experience with edged weapons and wields a variety of swords, shields and spears and he wears a suit of armor. Heimdall bore the Gjallerhorn ("Yelling Horn"), which he would sound to alert all of Asgard to dangers threatening the city's gates, functioning even on Midgard and capable of being heard by any and all Asgardians on the planet when sounded. While in the mortal form of Donald Velez he wore enchanted glasses which granted him super-enhanced vision. He possesses the golden-maned steed named Golltoppr ("Golden Top").

Heimdall is armed with an enchanted uru sword that has, on at least one occasion, allowed him to disguise himself as a human while on Earth. It is said by Heimdall to contain "all the cosmic force of the universe" has also been shown capable of projecting "the blue flame from countless cosmic suns", used both times to battle Thor, and enabled Heimdall to directly best the Thunder God the first time when the latter's strength was halved. Heimdall has also at least once wielded the powerful Sabre of Sorcery, which projected blasts of mystic energy and fire, against the Hulk when the latter was invading Asgard, but was unable to prevent him from entering the Realm Eternal.

== Other versions ==
=== Earth X ===
An alternate universe version of Heimdall from Earth-9997 appears in Earth X. This version is an alien who the Celestials manipulated into believing that he was a god.

=== Guardians of the Galaxy ===
An alternate universe version of Heimdall from Earth-691 appears in Guardians of the Galaxy.

=== Thor: The Mighty Avenger ===
An alternate universe version of Heimdall from Earth-10091 appears in Thor: The Mighty Avenger #6.

=== Ultimate Marvel ===
An alternate universe version of Heimdall from Earth-1610 appears in Ultimate Thor #2, where he is killed by Loki.

=== Ultimate Universe ===
In the Ultimate Universe imprint, Heimdall appears as a member of Thor and Sif's Asgardian Revolution.

== In other media ==
=== Television ===
- Heimdall appears in The Marvel Super Heroes, voiced by Gillie Fenwick.
- Heimdall appears in The Super Hero Squad Show, voiced by Steve Blum in the first season, and by Jess Harnell in the second.
- Heimdall appears in The Avengers: Earth's Mightiest Heroes, voiced by JB Blanc.
- Heimdall appears in Avengers Assemble, voiced by James C. Mathis III in the first and second seasons, and by Kevin Michael Richardson in the fourth season, Avengers: Secret Wars.
- Heimdall appears in the Hulk and the Agents of S.M.A.S.H. episode "For Asgard", voiced by Chris Bosh.
- Heimdall appears in Guardians of the Galaxy, voiced again by Kevin Michael Richardson.

=== Film ===
- Heimdall appears in a non-speaking cameo in the "Hulk vs. Thor" segment of Hulk Vs.

Idris Elba as Heimdall in the film Thor

- Heimdall appears in films set in the Marvel Cinematic Universe (MCU), portrayed by Idris Elba. He first appears in the live-action film Thor, before returning in Thor: The Dark World, Avengers: Age of Ultron, Thor: Ragnarok, Avengers: Infinity War, and Thor: Love and Thunder in a post-credits scene cameo. Additionally, alternate timeline variants of Heimdall appear in the Disney+ animated series What If...?.

=== Video games ===
- Heimdall appears in Marvel: Ultimate Alliance, voiced by Cam Clarke.
- Heimdall appears in Marvel Super Hero Squad, voiced again by Steve Blum.
- Heimdall makes a cameo in Thor's ending in Marvel vs. Capcom 3: Fate of Two Worlds.
- The MCU version of Heimdall appears in Thor: God of Thunder, voiced by Phil LaMarr.
- Heimdall appears in Marvel Avengers Alliance.
- The MCU version of Heimdall appears in Thor: The Dark World – The Official Game, voiced by Dennis Carnegie.
- Heimdall appears in Marvel Heroes.
- Heimdall appears in Lego Marvel Super Heroes, voiced by JB Blanc.
- Heimdall appears as a playable character in Lego Marvel's Avengers.
- Heimdall appears as a playable character in Marvel: Future Fight.
- Heimdall appears as a playable character in Marvel Avengers Academy.
- Heimdall appears in Lego Marvel Super Heroes 2, voiced by Colin McFarlane.
- Heimdall appears in Marvel Snap.
- Heimdall appears in Marvel Tokon: Fighting Souls, voiced by Imari Williams.
