= Journey into Mystery =

American comic book series

- The first issue of Journey into Mystery (June 1952); Cover art by Russ Heath and Stan Goldberg

Publication information
- Publisher: Atlas, Marvel
- Schedule: Monthly
- Format: Ongoing series
- Genre: Horror, Superhero
- Publication date: List: (vol. 1) June 1952 – February 1966 (vol. 2) October 1972 – October 1975 (Thor vol. 1 cont.) November 1996 – June 1998 (vol. 1 cont.) June 2011 – October 2013
- No. of issues: List: (vol. 1): 125 (vol. 2): 19 (Thor vol. 1 cont.): 20 (vol. 1 cont.): 35
- Main character: List: Thor (#83-125) Loki (#622-645) Sif (#646-655)

Creative team
- Written by: List: (vol. 1) Stan Lee Larry Lieber (vol. 2) Roy Thomas Steve Englehart Ron Goulart Steve Skeates George Alec Effinger Gardner Fox John Albano Marv Wolfman Kevin Frost (Thor vol. 1 cont.) Tom DeFalco (vol. 1 cont.) Kieron Gillen Kathryn Immonen
- Penciller: List: (vol. 1) Jack Kirby Steve Ditko (vol. 2) Gil Kane Ralph Reese Jim Starlin Billy Graham Sam Kweskin Gene Colan Win Mortimer P. Craig Russell Rich Buckler (Thor vol. 1 cont.) Mike Deodato Sal Buscema (vol. 1 cont.) Doug Braithwaite Richard Elson Carmine Di Giandomenico Valerio Schiti
- Inker: List: (vol. 1) Joe Sinnott Vince Colletta (vol. 2) Tom Palmer Ralph Reese Frank Giacoia Ernie Chan Dan Adkins Mike Esposito (Thor vol. 1 cont.) Al Milgrom (vol. 1 cont.) Allen Martinez
- Colorist: List: (vol. 2) George Roussos (Thor vol. 1 cont.) Marie Javins Steve Oliff (vol. 1 cont.) Ulises Arreola Ifansyah Noor Jordi Bellaire

Journey into Mystery is an American comic book series initially published by Atlas Comics, then by its successor, Marvel Comics. Initially a horror comics anthology, it changed to giant-monster and science fiction stories in the late 1950s. Beginning with issue #83 (cover dated Aug. 1962), it ran the superhero feature "The Mighty Thor", created by writers Stan Lee and Larry Lieber and artist Jack Kirby, and inspired by the mythological Norse thunder god. The series, which was renamed for its superhero star with issue #126 (March 1966), has been revived three times: in the 1970s as a horror anthology, and in the 1990s and 2010s with characters from Marvel's Thor mythos. The title was also used in 2019 for a limited series as part of the "War of the Realms" storyline.

== Publication history ==
=== 1950s–1960s ===
The first Journey into Mystery series was initially a horror-fantasy anthology published by Marvel Comics' 1950s forerunner, Atlas Comics, with a first issue cover-dated June 1952. Artist Joe Kubert, who would later become one of the main war comics artists for DC Comics, drew the story "The Hog" in Journey into Mystery #21 (January 1955). Issue #23 was the first to be approved by the Comics Code Authority, which led to restrictions on horror comics. The title was caught in the collapse of Atlas' distributor, and publication was suspended for a year between issues #48 (Aug. 1957) and #49 (Nov. 1958). Xemnu, a huge, furry alien monster, first appeared in Journey Into Mystery #62 (Nov. 1960). The character reappeared in issue #66 (March 1961). Since then the character has been a mainstay in the Marvel Universe, and was renamed Xemnu the Titan. Journey into Mystery #69 and the teen-humor title Patsy Walker #95 (both June 1961) are the first modern comic books labeled "Marvel Comics", with each showing an "MC" box on its cover.

The debut of Thor, in Journey into Mystery #83 (Aug. 1962). Cover art by Jack Kirby and Joe Sinnott.

Beginning with issue #83 (Aug. 1962), the title introduced the Norse god superhero Thor. The anthological stories, by now primarily science fiction-fantasy, gradually diminished after this, with the Thor-spinoff backup feature "Tales of Asgard" beginning in issue #97 (Oct. 1963). They were dropped entirely with issue #105 (June 1964), when the "Thor" feature expanded from 13 to 18 pages. With the previous issue, the cover logo had changed to Journey into Mystery with the Mighty Thor. Its final issue was #125 (Feb. 1966), after which the series was retitled The Mighty Thor in its trademarked cover logo and simply Thor in its postal indicia copyright notice. Thor's evil adoptive brother Loki was introduced in issue #85 (October 1962). Other adversaries for the new hero included the Radioactive Man introduced in #93 (June 1963), the Enchantress and the Executioner in #104 (April 1964), the Absorbing Man in #114 (March 1965), and the Destroyer in #118 (July 1965). An oversized annual publication, featuring Thor, was released in 1965 and introduced the Marvel version of the Greco-Roman demigod Hercules. Comics historian Les Daniels noted that "the adventures of Thor were gradually transformed from stories about a strange-looking superhero into a spectacular saga."

=== Volume 2 (1970s) ===
A second Journey into Mystery ran 19 issues (October 1972 – October 1975). The title was one of four launched by Marvel Comics editor-in-chief Roy Thomas to form a line of science fiction and horror anthologies with more thematic cohesion than the company's earlier attempts that decade, which had included the series Chamber of Darkness and Tower of Shadows. Whereas those titles generally presented original stories, these new books would instead adapt genre classics and other stories. With the four titles' debuts set to be staggered over the course of four months, Marvel premiered Journey into Mystery vol. 2 (October 1972), Chamber of Chills (Nov. 1972), Supernatural Thrillers (Dec. 1972), and, with a late start, Worlds Unknown (May 1973).

The first five issues of Journey into Mystery vol. 2 featured such adaptations as Robert E. Howard's "Dig Me No Grave", by writer Thomas and penciler Gil Kane, in issue #1; Robert Bloch's "Yours Truly, Jack the Ripper" by Thomas and Ron Goulart and penciler Kane, in #2; and H. P. Lovecraft's "The Haunter of the Dark" by Goulart and penciler Gene Colan, in addition to anthological horror stories by writers including George Alec Effinger, Steve Gerber, Steve Englehart, and Steve Skeates, and pencilers such as Billy Graham, Jim Starlin, Ralph Reese, and P. Craig Russell. Most issues also included a reprinted story from Marvel's 1950s predecessor, Atlas Comics. By issue #6, however, the magazine became a reprint title featuring science-fiction and giant-monster tales from the first Journey into Mystery series, as well as from the "pre-superhero Marvel" anthologies Amazing Adult Fantasy, Strange Tales, Strange Worlds, and Tales to Astonish.

=== 1990s series ===
As a consequence of the company-wide crossover "Heroes Reborn", Thor ceased to be the focus of his own series, which was restored to Journey into Mystery beginning with issue #503 (Nov. 1996). The feature "The Lost Gods" ran through issue #513, followed by issues starring Shang-Chi, Master of Kung Fu and the Black Widow for three issues each, and reluctant vampire Hannibal King for two, ending with issue #521 (June 1998).

=== 2010s series ===
The Thor title resumed its original numbering in 2009 with Thor #600, including the intervening issues of Thor in its count while disregarding the 1990s Journey Into Mystery issues. Starting with issue #622, the series for a second time had its title restored to Journey Into Mystery, which accompanied the launch of a new title, Mighty Thor. Thor's supporting cast returned as the focus of a run written by Kieron Gillen, who had written Thor from #604 to #614, and drawn by Doug Braithwaite. Starring was the Thor antagonist Loki, who had been reincarnated as a child following his sacrifice in the series Siege. Gillen's run was favorably reviewed, with one critic writing:

Gillen's work has always been big on theme and interconnectedness, and this is no exception. The finale encapsulates the run as a whole — ambitious, ambiguous, clever and uncompromising, as challenging as it is entertaining. Sometimes those qualities hurt it, and although sales were never especially healthy it's to Marvel's credit that they helped keep it afloat long enough for a proper ending when the alternative would have surely been easier.

In Gillen's final issue, a letter from Tom Hiddleston, who portrays Loki in the Marvel Cinematic Universe, was published, in which he praised Gillen for his take on the character.

With issue #646, the focus of Journey into Mystery changed with its rebranding under the Marvel NOW! imprint. Written by Kathryn Immonen and drawn by Valerio Schiti, the series began starring the Marvel Asgardians, with Lady Sif as its lead character. The series was cancelled with issue #655 (Oct. 2013).

=== War of the Realms: Journey into Mystery ===
During the "War of the Realms" storyline in 2019, the title was used for a limited five–issue run written by Griffin, Justin, Travis and Clint McElroy. The series was drawn by André Lima Araújo with covers from Valerio Schiti. In the limited series, Spider-Man, Hawkeye, Wonder Man, Sebastian Druid, Death Locket, Thori the Hellhound, and Balder the Brave go on a quest to save the Earth. In 2023, the McElroys continued the storyline in the "Outre Space" arc of their tabletop role playing podcast, The Adventure Zone, using the Marvel Multiverse rules set.

== Collected editions ==
- Marvel Masterworks: Atlas Era Journey Into Mystery
  - Volume 1 collects Journey into Mystery #1-10, 272 pages, 2008, ISBN 978-0785129264
  - Volume 2 collects Journey into Mystery #11-20, 272 pages, 2009, ISBN 978-0785134992
  - Volume 3 collects Journey into Mystery #21-30, 272 pages, 2010, ISBN 978-0785141884
  - Volume 4 collects Journey into Mystery #31-40, 272 pages, 2012, ISBN 978-0785159254
- Marvel Masterworks: The Mighty Thor
  - Volume 1 collects Journey into Mystery #83-100, 280 pages, 1991, ISBN 978-0785112679
  - Volume 2 collects Journey into Mystery #101-110, 224 pages, 1994, ISBN 978-0785111917
  - Volume 3 collects Journey into Mystery #111-120 and Journey into Mystery Annual #1, 256 pages, 2001, ISBN 978-0785112686
  - Volume 4 collects Journey into Mystery #121-125 and Thor #126-130, 240 pages, 2005, ISBN 978-0785118800
- Essential Thor
  - Volume 1 collects Journey into Mystery #83-112, 536 pages, 2001, ISBN 978-0785118664
  - Volume 2 collects Journey into Mystery #113-125; ''Journey into Mystery Annual #1; Thor #126-136; and Thor Annual #2, 584 pages, 2005, ISBN 978-0785115915
- Origins of Marvel Comics includes Thor story from Journey into Mystery #83, 254 pages, 1974, Simon & Schuster, ISBN 978-0671218638
- Bring on the Bad Guys includes Thor stories from Journey into Mystery #112-113 and 115, 253 pages, 1976, Simon & Schuster, ISBN 978-0671223557
- Fear Itself: Journey into Mystery collects #622-626, Thor Spotlight, and Fear Itself Spotlight, 136 pages, 2012, ISBN 978-0785148418
- Journey into Mystery: Fear Itself Fallout collects #626.1, 627-631, 136 pages, 2012, ISBN 978-0785152620
- Journey into Mystery: Terrorism Myth collects #632-636, 120 pages, 2012, ISBN 978-0785161066
- Journey into Mystery/New Mutants: Exiled collects #637-638, Exiled #1, and New Mutants #42-43, 120 pages, 2012, ISBN 978-0785165408
- Journey into Mystery: The Manchester Gods collects #639-641 and The Mighty Thor Annual #1, 120 pages, 2012, ISBN 978-0785161073
- The Mighty Thor/Journey into Mystery: Everything Burns collects #642-645 and The Mighty Thor #18-22, 216 pages, 2013, ISBN 978-0785161684
- Journey Into Mystery Featuring Sif – Vol. 1: Stronger Than Monsters collects #646-650, 120 pages, 2013. ISBN 978-0785161080
- Journey Into Mystery Featuring Sif – Vol. 2: Seeds of Destruction collects #651-655, 112 pages, 2013, ISBN 978-0785184478
- War of the Realms: Journey Into Mystery collects #1-5, 112 pages, 2019, ISBN 978-1302918347

== In other media ==
- In the 2011 film Thor, a billboard features the words "Journey into Mystery".
- In the pilot episode for Agents of S.H.I.E.L.D., S.H.I.E.L.D. Agent Jemma Simmons asks Grant Ward, "Are you excited to be coming on our journey into mystery?"
- The fifth episode of the Disney+ series Loki is titled "Journey into Mystery."
- In "Nickel Boys" by Colson Whitehead Elwood mentions reading the "Journey into Mystery" books

== See also ==
- Amazing Fantasy
- Strange Tales
- Tales of Suspense
- Tales to Astonish
