= Asgard (comics) =

Fictional realm in the Marvel Comics universe

- Asgard and some of the inhabitants of the Asgardian dimension on the cover of Tales of Asgard #1 (October 1968); Art by Jack Kirby.
- First appearance: Journey into Mystery #85 (October 1962)
- Created by: Stan Lee; Larry Lieber; Jack Kirby

In-universe information
- Type: Realm
- Race: Asgardians
- Publisher: Marvel Comics

Asgard is a fictional realm and its capital city appearing in American comic books published by Marvel Comics. Created by Stan Lee, Larry Lieber and Jack Kirby, the realm first appeared in Journey into Mystery #85 (October 1962). Based on the realm of the same name from Germanic mythology (particularly Norse), Asgard is home to the Asgardians and other beings adapted from Norse mythology. It features prominently in stories that follow the Marvel Comics superhero Thor.

Asgard has appeared in comics and various media adaptations, including the Marvel Cinematic Universe films Thor (2011), Thor: The Dark World (2013), Avengers: Age of Ultron (2015), Thor: Ragnarok (2017), Avengers: Endgame (2019), and the Disney+ series Loki (2021). Eventually, Asgard was relocated to Earth in Norway and appeared in Avengers: Endgame and Thor: Love and Thunder (2022).

== Fictional history ==
Asgard consists of nine primary realms. The first two, Niflheim and Muspelheim, formed on their own some time after the universe was created. The deity Odin and his brothers, Vili and Ve, killed Ymir and used his bones to create the realm of Midgard between Niflheim and Muspelheim. The siblings went to create mountains and trees using Ymir's bones and hair respectively, then raised his skull upon four pillars to create the heavens. Sparks from Muspelheim were used to create the Sun, Moon, and stars. When Midgard was complete, Odin and his brothers created a home for themselves above it called Asgard. Between the two worlds, they formed a rainbow bridge called the Bifröst.

Once a year Odin must undertake the Odinsleep to regain his strength. During this time Asgard is vulnerable to attack from enemies.

It is prophesied that Loki would lead Asgard's enemies in a final conflict known as Ragnarök, which will lead to Asgard's destruction. This comes to pass when Loki obtains the forge that created Mjolnir and creates new uru hammers for his army. Asgard and its inhabitants are destroyed in the resulting battle. After Ragnarök, Thor returns to Earth and rebuilds Asgard outside of Broxton, Oklahoma. He then gathers the Asgardians, who had been reborn as mortals.

Asgard is destroyed yet again after Norman Osborn seizes control of S.H.I.E.L.D. following the Secret Invasion as he seeks to expel the Asgardians. Osborn's forces are defeated with help from the reunited Avengers, although Asgard is toppled by Sentry. Immediately following the Siege, Thor erects Heimdall's observatory atop Stark Tower as sign of solidarity with Midgard and appreciation for the Avengers' aid.

During the "Original Sin" storyline, it is revealed that there is a tenth realm in Asgard called Heven that is inhabited by angels. It was cut off from the rest of the realms following the Angels' attack on Asgard, which led to the apparent death of Odin's daughter Aldrif.

== Regions ==
The Asgard dimension contains several distinct regions.

=== The Nine Realms ===
World	Notes
Asgard	Home of the Asgardians. Asgard is the name of the planetoid, a distinct region on the planetoid and its capital city.
Vanaheim	Home of the Vanir who are the sister race of the Asgardians. Vanaheim is a distinct region on the Asgard planetoid.
Alfheim	Home of the Light Elves. Alfheim is a distinct region on the Asgard planetoid.
Nidavellir	Home of the Dwarves. Nidavellir is a distinct region on the Asgard planetoid.
Midgard	The Earthly plane. Although not technically a part of the Asgardian dimension, it is considered one of the Nine Worlds because of its significant connections to Asgard.
Jotunheim	Home of the Frost Giants.
Svartalfheim	Home of the Dark Elves.
Helheim	Realm of the dead who are neither honored nor dishonored. Ruled by Hela.
Muspelheim	Home of the Fire Giants/Demons. Ruled by Surtur.

=== Other worlds and regions ===
Region	Notes
Heven	The tenth world of Asgard and home of the Angels which is paradisal, it was cut off from the rest of Asgard by Odin long ago and not rediscovered until the 2014 Original Sin storyline.
Valhalla	Odin's great palace of the honoured dead and is a distinct region on the Asgard planetoid.
Nornheim	Realm of the Asgard planetoid ruled by Karnilla.
Niflheim	Realm of the cold and ice; another place for the dishonoured dead, closely connected with Helheim.

== The six races ==
The six races of intelligent humanoid beings known to reside within the Asgard dimension.

Race		Notes
Asgardians	Æsir	The Asgardians are beings of godlike power who are worshipped as gods. They are divided into two major groups: the Æsir and the Vanir.
Asgardians	Vanir	The Asgardians are beings of godlike power who are worshipped as gods. They are divided into two major groups: the Æsir and the Vanir.
Demons		Fire Demons are beings of fire and tend to be about the same stature as the Asgardians.
Dwarves		Dwarves are smaller in stature than the Asgardians, and have short, stocky bodies. Their average height is four feet (1.2 meters).
Elves	Dark Elves	Elves vary greatly in size from four to eight feet (1.2 to 2.4 meters). They tend toward slender bodies and proportionately longer limbs. The dark elves tend to be darker in color than the light elves. Both types have natural proclivity towards magic.
Elves	Light Elves	Elves vary greatly in size from four to eight feet (1.2 to 2.4 meters). They tend toward slender bodies and proportionately longer limbs. The dark elves tend to be darker in color than the light elves. Both types have natural proclivity towards magic.
Giants		Giants are large humanoids averaging twenty feet (6.1 meters) tall, although some may reach thirty feet (9.1 meters). On occasion, giants have stunted offspring who resemble the Asgardians.
Trolls		Trolls are stocky and massive humanoids with thick body hair. They are on average taller than the Asgardians but shorter than giants, around seven feet (2.1 meters) tall, although some trolls are considerably taller. Trolls tend to be extremely strong, stronger than the average Asgardian, dwarf or elf and on par with giants.

=== Racial attributes ===
Although they look human, all Asgardians possess certain superhuman physical attributes. They are extremely long-lived (though not immortal like their Olympian counterparts), aging at an extremely slow rate upon reaching adulthood (through the periodic consumption of the golden apples of Idunn). Asgardians possess superhuman strength, stamina, and durability, which leaves them immune to terrestrial disease.

== Flora and fauna ==
=== Flora ===
Yggdrasil, the world tree, is an immense ash tree that is central to the Asgardian dimension. The tree is supported by three roots that extend far into the other worlds; one to the spring of Hvergelmir in Niflheim, one to the well of Mimir in Jotunheim, and another to the well of Wyrd. Though Midgard is not physically connected to Yggdrasil, it is said that the Earth's axis is in alignment with the tree.

=== Fauna ===
- Dragons are ancient creatures that are stated to live in Nastrond. These include Fafnir, Hakurel; a dragon Thor slew during one of his earliest adventures, and Nidhogg; who feeds on the roots of Yggdrasil.
- Eagles are giant sapient versions of their Earthly counterparts. These include Gnori; king of snow eagles whom a young Thor, Sif and Balder sought for one of his feathers as part of a quest, and Lerad; an eagle that guards the magic apples of Yggdrasil.
- Fenris Wolf: A giant wolf that is said to be the offspring of Loki and the giantess Angrboða.
- Geri and Freki: Odin's pet wolves. Freki stopped an assassination attempt on Thor's life during a time known as the Reigning, when Thor assumed the throne of Asgard and ruled both Asgard and Midgard with an iron fist.
- Huginn and Muninn: Odin's pet ravens.
- Midgard Serpent: An immense serpent who lives in the Sea of Space circling Midgard.
- Ratatosk: A squirrel who lives on Yggdrasil and carries messages between Lerad and Nidhogg.
- Sleipnir: Odin's eight-legged horse steed.
- Toothgnasher and Toothgrinder: A pair of mystical goats who pull Thor's chariot.

== Reception ==
=== Accolades ===
- In 2019, CBR.com ranked Asgard 6th in their "10 Most Iconic Superhero Hideouts In Marvel Comics" list.

== In other media ==
=== Television ===
- Asgard appears in the Spider-Man and His Amazing Friends episode "The Vengeance of Loki".
- Asgard appears in The Super Hero Squad Show.
- Asgard appears in The Avengers: Earth's Mightiest Heroes.
- Asgard appears in the Ultimate Spider-Man episode "Field Trip".
- Asgard appears in Avengers Assemble.
- Asgard appears in Hulk and the Agents of S.M.A.S.H.
- Asgard appears in the Guardians of the Galaxy episode "We are the World Tree".
- Asgard appears in the M.O.D.O.K. episode "Tales from the Great Bar-Mitzvah War!".
- Asgard appears in a flashback sequence in the Loki episode "The Nexus Event".

=== Film ===
Asgard as depicted in the 2011 feature film Thor.

- Asgard appears in Hulk vs. Thor.
- Asgard appears in Thor: Tales of Asgard.
- Asgard and Jotunheim appear in the Marvel Cinematic Universe live-action film Thor (2011), directed by Kenneth Branagh.
- Asgard, Svartalfheim, Vanaheim, and Jotunheim appear in Thor: The Dark World (2013). Muspelheim is also seen briefly through a dimensional rift.
- Asgard and Muspelheim appear in Thor: Ragnarok (2017), where Asgard is devastated by Surtur. Following Asgard's destruction, Thor and the surviving Asgardians leave Asgard to find a new home.
- Nidavellir appears in the live-action film Avengers: Infinity War (2018). This version is a neutron star surrounded by a forge which the dwarves used to craft weapons.
- An alternate version of Asgard appears in Avengers: Endgame (2019). Thor and Rocket travel to an alternate 2013 timeline and visit Asgard to retrieve the Reality Stone.

=== Video games ===
- Asgard appears in Marvel: Ultimate Alliance.
- Asgard appears in Marvel Super Hero Squad.
- Asgard appears in Thor: God of Thunder.
- Asgard appears as a stage in Marvel vs. Capcom 3: Fate of Two Worlds and its remake Ultimate Marvel vs. Capcom 3.
- Asgard appears in Marvel Super Hero Squad Online.
- Asgard appears in Marvel Heroes.
- Asgard appears in Lego Marvel Super Heroes, Lego Marvel's Avengers and Lego Marvel Super Heroes 2.
- Asgard appears as a stage in Marvel vs. Capcom: Infinite, merged with Abel City from the Mega Man X series to become Xgard.
- Asgard appears in Marvel Snap.

=== Theme parks ===
Asgard appears in the Disneyland attraction "Treasures of Asgard".
