= Evil (disambiguation) =

Evil is the absence or opposite of good.

Evil may also refer to:

== Fictional characters ==
- Evil the Cat, a villain from the Earthworm Jim cartoon series
- Dr. Evil, a character from the Austin Powers series of films
- Evil Neuro, frequently referred to simply as Evil, an Internet character associated with Neuro-sama

== Film, literature and television ==
- The Evil (1978 film), an American horror film
- Evil (novel), original title: Ondskan, a 1981 Swedish novel by Jan Guillou
  - Evil (2003 film), a Swedish film based on Guillou's novel
  - Evil (Swedish TV series), 2023, based on Guillou's novel
- Evil (2005 film), a Greek horror film
  - Evil: In the Time of Heroes, a 2009 Greek horror film prequel of the 2005 film
- Evil, alternate title of the 2006 Russian film The Power of Fear
- Evil (American TV series), a 2019 American supernatural drama

== Music ==
- Evil (band), a Miami garage group, active 1965–1967
- "Evil" (Earth, Wind & Fire song), 1973
- "Evil" (Eminem song), 2024
- "Evil" (Grinderman song), 2010
- "Evil" (Howlin' Wolf song), 1954, written by Willie Dixon
- "Evil" (Interpol song), 2005
- "Evil" (Ladytron song), 2003
- "Evil (A Chorus of Resistance)", a song by Project 86 from the 2007 album Rival Factions
- "Evil", a song by 45 Grave from the 1983 album Sleep in Safety
- "Evil", a song by Baboon from the 2002 album Something Good Is Going to Happen to You
- "Evil", a song by The Flaming Lips from the 2009 album Embryonic
- "Evil", a song by Heavenly from the 2004 album Dust to Dust
- "Evil", a song by Impending Doom from the 2018 album The Sin and Doom Vol. II
- "Evil", a song by Melanie Martinez from the 2023 album Portals
- "Evil", a song by Mercyful Fate from the 1983 album Melissa
- "Evil", a song by Stevie Wonder from the 1972 album Music of My Mind
- "Evil", alter ego of Eminem as one half of the hip-hop duo Bad Meets Evil

== Other uses ==
- Evil (wrestler) (born 1987), ring name for Japanese professional wrestler Takaaki Watanabe
- Mount Evil, a mountain in Tennessee, US
- Evil (Alderac Entertainment Group), a 2001 role-playing game supplement published by Alderac Entertainment Group
- Evil bit, a fictional internet protocol for "evil" transmissions to identify themselves
- EVIL (electronic viewfinder, interchangeable lens), alternate term for a mirrorless interchangeable-lens camera
- Evil, a web app made by Tom Scott

== See also ==
- Arnulf, Duke of Bavaria (died 937), known as "Arnulf the Evil"
- Iuz, a demigod in Iuz the Evil, a Dungeons & Dragons sourcebook
- Mordred (comics), a Marvel Comics character known as "Mordred the Evil"
- The protagonist of The Saga of Tanya the Evil, a Japanese light novel series
- King's evil, a disease of the cervical lymph nodes
- Poll evil, a disease of horses and other equids
- Evel (disambiguation)
- Douglas Evill (1892–1971), British air marshal
