= Morgan le Fay (Marvel Comics) =

Marvel Comics fictional character

- Morgan le Fay. Art by Marko Djurdjevic.

Publication information
- Publisher: Marvel Comics
- First appearance: Black Knight #1 (May 1955)
- Created by: Stan Lee (writer); Joe Maneely (artist)

In-story information
- Species: Human/fairy hybrid
- Team affiliations: Darkholders
- Notable aliases: Morganna Le Fay
- Abilities: Gifted intellect; Magic manipulation; Virtual immortality

Morgan le Fay is a supervillain appearing in American comic books published by Marvel Comics. The character, created by Stan Lee and Joe Maneely, is based on the Morgan le Fay of Arthurian legend. In this version of the character, Morgan le Fay belongs to the species of humanoid magical beings called fairies, who are born with supernatural powers, and is the half-faerie half-sister of the mythic King Arthur. Her elven heritage granted her immortality, and she used this time to master the mystic arts. She occasionally tries to take over the world. She has been an opponent of The Avengers, and in the 1970s, she appeared in the original Spider-Woman comic acting as a foe of Jessica Drew, while opposed by a reincarnation of her "ancient foe" Magnus. She is a former lover of Doctor Doom (the father of her daughter Caroline), and was a member of the Darkholders for a time.

Morgan le Fay has been described as one of Marvel's most notable and powerful female villains.

The character was portrayed by Jessica Walter in the 1978 television film Dr. Strange. Elizabeth Hurley portrayed the character in the third season of the Hulu streaming television series Runaways.

== Publication history ==
Morgan le Fay first appeared in Black Knight #1 (May 1955) from Atlas Comics, written by Stan Lee and illustrated by Joe Maneely. After the Black Knight series ended in 1956, she was eventually reintroduced into Marvel Comics in Spider-Woman #2 (May 1978).

In addition Morgan le Fay appeared in the following comics:

- IRON MAN (1968) #150 Published 1st September 1981
- MYSTIC ARCANA (2007) #2 Published 18th July 2007
- THE MIGHTY AVENGERS (2007) #9 Published 20th February 2008
- DARK AVENGERS (2009) #1 Published 21st January 2009
- WEIRDWORLD (2015) #1 Published 10th June 2015
- WEIRDWORLD (2015) #1 Published 16th December 2015
- WEAPON H (2018) #9 Published 17th October 2018

== Fictional character biography ==
=== Medieval times ===
Morgan Le Fay was born in Tintagel Castle, in Cornwall, England, in the days of Camelot, in the Sixth Century A.D. She became a high priestess, and the leader of the Sixth Century cult of the Darkhold, as well as Queen of Gorre (a section of Britain). She and the rest of the cult used the Darkhold to summon its author Chthon. When they found they could not control him, they sealed the dark god away in Wundagore Mountain. By this time - convinced that Morgan was thoroughly corrupted by evil - her apprentice and lover Magnus the Sorcerer stole the Darkhold from her. Along with her lover Mordred she was the nemesis of the original Black Knight.

During this time, Morgan Le Fay was visited by a supervillain from the future named Doctor Doom to enlist her in helping wrest his mother Cynthia Von Doom's soul from Hell. Le Fay agreed on the condition that Doom become the general of her army, undead warriors of those slain by the sword Excalibur against her half-brother King Arthur. Iron Man defeated Le Fay causing her to flee to another realm. Doom swore vengeance on Iron Man for this, vowing to see the hero dead.

=== Conflict with the modern era ===
Morgan Le Fay first projected her astral form from her physical body in the Sixth Century A.D. to the present day. She mentally dominated "Slapper" Struthers, transforming him into the superhuman Excaliber, and directed him to retrieve the Darkhold from Magnus. When he failed, she sent her astral form to get the Darkhold from the Werewolf, and was defeated by Spider-Woman and Magnus. Impressed by her mettle in battle, Morgan attempted to enlist Spider-Woman into her eternal servitude, but was denied. Seeking revenge, she began tormenting Spider-Woman with hallucinations, but Magnus came to her aid, and Le Fay's physical body was destroyed in combat with Spider-Woman's astral form. She was able to lock out Spider-Woman's astral form from her physical body, and attempted to possess it for herself. She was thwarted by the Avengers, Magnus, Doctor Strange and the Shroud in a battle on the astral plane.

Morgan then attempted to possess the body of Lisa Russell, but was repulsed by Iron Man. Morgan then allied with Mordred the Evil. She dispatched Dreadknight, Balor, and other Celtic netherworld monsters against the Black Knight and Doctor Strange. She attempted to turn Earth into a dimension ruled by black magic.

=== Avengers assemble again ===
Using the monsters of Norse mythology, she and Mordred lured the Scarlet Witch (and a team of Avengers) to Tintagel in Cornwall. There, she kidnapped the Scarlet Witch and used her reality-warping powers to 'bridge the gap' between her elven magic and an Asgardian doomsday device known as the Twilight Sword. Using the Sword, she remade reality: the world was now a Middle Ages equivalent of itself, except that she ruled the world, and had done so for some time. The Avengers stepped in and freed the Scarlet Witch, thus negating the original spell the others were based on, and restoring reality.

Doctor Doom is revealed to be in a sexual/romantic relationship with Le Fay, traveling back to the past in order to carry on liaisons with her. Le Fay has told Doom to bring her back something "of value" as a gift the next time he comes to her time or not to come back at all. He later returns, asking for her help in creating an army of loyal inhuman warriors. Doom offers her whatever she wants, with her response still currently unknown as Doom reappears in the present with his army of Mindless Ones. Later, Le Fay is seen sadly looking out her window for the return of Doom, who has been defeated and incarcerated by the Mighty Avengers.

=== Dark Reign ===
During the "Dark Reign" storyline, Morgan appears as the Dark Avengers' first enemy. She used a spell to peer into the future and witnessed the formation of the Cabal. She traveled into the future with an army of demons. At first, she attempted to kill Doom when he was a child, but then decided to go ahead several decades, so that Doom could fully know why she was going to kill him, choosing after the Skrull invasion and engaged Doom in magical combat. As Doom begins to lose, a H.A.M.M.E.R. soldier calls Osborn, and the Dark Avengers arrive to rescue Doom. The Sentry tears off her head, but she subsequently violently reappeared in his place, and took control over the new Spider-Man, who attacked Ares. She is killed again by the new Hawkeye, but she reappears again. She and her demons are seen fighting the Dark Avengers, while Doom and Iron Patriot travel back in time to kill her in her own time. However, when they arrive, after an unsuccessful magical assault on the two men (due to the considerable amount of iron in their armor suits, the one substance her faerie enchantments cannot affect), she reveals to Osborn her knowledge that Doom plans to betray her and that if they kill her, it will affect Doom's own lifeline, claiming Doom will fall to his nature and betray Osborn; Doom responds by chanting a spell of a language that even she possesses no knowledge to forcibly send the sorceress into her own enchanted cauldron, despite her screams and pleas. Though Morgan lives, she is sent to 1,000,000 BC where she runs from a tribe of cavemen fighting a Tyrannosaurus. Doctor Doom magically restores Latveria and the revived Dark Avengers head back to America.

=== Avengers World ===
After having been freed by her daughter Caroline le Fay from her own magic cauldron that Doom trapped her in, Morgan le Fay took over a City of the Dead underneath Velletri, Italy, a mystical necropolis of which there are many below European cities. From here she launched a massive attack with armies of the dead all over Europe.

The Avengers and the Euroforce joined forces to take her down, but they were easily overpowered by the hordes of the dead. Sebastian Druid tried to aid the heroes, but he was killed by le Fay shortly after arriving at the city. However, killing Druid worked out against Morgan's plans. He became a ghost of the city which, being one of them, allowed his magic to work, pulling back the armies back to their respective necropolises, severely weakening le Fay. The Avengers and the Euroforce proceeded to beat her up, forcing her to retreat.

=== Queen of Otherworld ===
Morgan le Fay later resurfaced and planned to conquer Camelot on Otherworld but when the flowers of Krakoa reach Otherworld to form a Gateway to Krakoa, it infected Camelot, causing le Fay to find a way to destroy it. In order to achieve this, she needed to terminate the "Witchbreed", who were responsible for this. After Brian Braddock and his twin sister, Betsy Braddock came to fix the Gateway, le Fay apprehended them and took control of Brian, making him to turn on his sister. However, he managed to give to Betsy his amulet, which allowed her to escape. Morgan then allied with the Coven Akkaba in order to deal with the Witchbreeds.

== Powers and abilities ==
Morgan le Fay possesses a natural affinity for magical forces which is a result of her half-faerie genetic structure. She possesses a gifted intellect, and as a former pupil of Merlin with centuries of study, she is considered one of the greatest sorceresses in Earth's history. Her magical powers are derived from three major sources. Due to her faerie heritage she possesses innate personal powers such as the ability to control minds. She also has the faerie ability to manipulate mystical energy, often through spells and enchantments of ancient Celtic origin, an ability she has honed through practice. She also possesses abilities all humans potentially have, such as the ability to engage in astral projection. Finally, she has abilities as a high priestess of the Earth goddess (Gaea) by invoking her Celtic name, Danu.

Morgan can mystically manipulate both the natural environment of Earth and the environment of the astral plane in which she once existed. She can cast illusions, project mystical bolts (which can affect physical beings and objects even when she is in astral form), create mystical force shields and remove spirits from their bodies and place those spirits under her control. When in physical form, she can fly and change her shape into other people or animals (both real and mythical). She also has healing powers which she might have used on her former foe King Arthur on transporting him to Otherworld. Morgan is also a necromancer and can use her powers to be everywhere at once as an omnipresent being. She has the power to transmute one thing into another.

Morgan can also tap into and manipulate powerful magical energies for powerful feats of magic without having to tax upon her normal magical abilities, such as when she used the power of the Norn Stones and the Twilight Sword to restructure reality (although she needed the Scarlet Witch to bridge her Faerie heritage to the Asgardian magic). Morgan has utilized the Crimson Bands of Cyttorak to bind Doctor Strange and Balor. She is also able to time travel.

Morgan is virtually immortal. Her spirit has restored her physical body at the various times it has been destroyed.

In The New Avengers #53, the Eye of Agamotto appeared to Morgan, as it considered her a possible replacement for Doctor Strange as Sorcerer Supreme.

== Reception ==
=== Critical reception ===
Chase Magnett of ComicBook.com referred to Morgan le Fay as one of the "best Doctor Strange villains", asserting, "Morgan Le Fay ties Doctor Strange to one of Earth's greatest sorcerers of all time: Merlin. Her machinations and schemes have crossed centuries and show the true power of a magician filled with ill will. She has destroyed kingdoms and challenged all of the Avengers. Doctor Strange cannot simply overpower Morgan Le Fay, but must understand her often-obscured goals in order to do the right thing. She challenges him to be a detective as much as a superhero, and reveals another dark mirror for someone as powerful as Doctor Strange."

Gab Hernandez of Screen Rant called Morgan le Fay one of the "smartest magic users", writing, "Morgan Le Fay is one of the oldest magic casters in the Marvel Universe and shown to be one of the most successful at fulfilling her plans time and time again. She's incredibly manipulative and often employs underhanded schemes to win against overwhelming odds. For the most part, though, Morgan Le Fay knows how effective a show of force can be. Her centuries of experience have given her an edge in planning over a lot of the other magic users in the Marvel Universe. Having one of the greatest wizards to have ever lived, Merlin, as her mentor has also given her knowledge that even other high-tier sorcerers are unaware of."

CBR Staff of CBR.com described Morgan le Fay as one of the "most powerful Sorcerer Supreme candidates", stating, "Having studied under the master magician Merlin, Morgan is widely considered one of the most powerful sorceresses in history. She can create physical manifestations of astral clones, manipulate the Earth, shapeshift, and can absorb mystic energy from magical artifacts. At one point, she absorbed the energy of a Norn Stone to travel through time. In addition to her Celtic heritage magic, Morgan has studied with the Ancient One and can even use Doctor Strange's signature Crimson Bands of Cyttorak. She's already been considered and rejected for the role of Sorcerer Supreme before, but there's no denying that she's far and away the most experienced sorceress in the Marvel Universe today."

George Marston of Newsarama named Morgan le Fay one of the characters who has the "power, the experience, and/or the pure determination to inherit the Cloak of Levitation and the Eye of Agamotto and take up residence at the Sanctum Sanctorum as Earth's latest and greatest Sorcerer Supreme," saying, "Nearly all of the possible candidates for Sorcerer Supreme - even dastardly Doctor Doom - would ultimately possess the same dedication to the job of protecting Earth from magical threats as Doctor Strange, if not the same methods and morals. But Morgan le Fay, an evil sorcerer who has been a magical menace to the Marvel Universe since the days of King Arthur, would undoubtedly shirk the job in favor of her own selfish ends. As powerful as Morgan le Fay is - and make no mistake, she's extremely powerful - she's just as diabolical and driven by her lust for power. It's those qualities that might disqualify her before she even gets a chance to do a poor job, however."

Dais Johnston of Inverse called Morgan le Fay "perfect for an Avengers face-off", asserting, "Marvel has explored all sorts of different genres in its 23-movie history, but we haven't visited the story of King Arthur and the Knights of the Roundtable — yet. Many people claim Marvel movies are the new mythologies of our age. What better way to prove this theory than to have them face off against a villain from actual mythology, and one with a history deeply entrenched in Marvel's history."

Conner Schwerdtfeger of CinemaBlend named Morgan le Fay one of the characters "that should definitely debut in the Marvel Cinematic Universe following Doctor Strange," stating, "Deriving her name from Arthurian legend, Morgan le Fay is definitely one of the more exotic characters on this list. A half-fairy with the ability to manipulate mystic energy and a seemingly infinite life span, this super villain been alive since the sixth century and has often found herself depicted as a major opponent for the entire Avengers roster. She's a major mystical player in the Marvel universe, and a perfect enemy for an Avengers movie in a future Phase."

Marc Buxton of Den of Geek wrote, "Let's get all Arthurian with the world's original femme fatale, the wicked Morgan Le Fay. Now that magic is in the MCU, perhaps it's time to bring in some classic literary figures from the past. Gosh knows Marvel has enough of them, but Morgan Le Fey, the woman responsible for the downfall of Camelot, has a long and storied history as a Marvel villainess. Le Fay has fought Iron Man many times in her bid to conquer Camelot in the past and present and she has also run afoul of Stephen Strange and is a deadly enemy to all life. Let's face it, Marvel is modern myth storytelling and mashing up past mythic beings like Morgan Le Fay in the modern MCU would be nothing short of magical."

Evan Valentine of Collider said, "Morgan Le Fay is a sorceress who has regularly been a thorn in the side of the Avengers since her first appearance in Marvel's Black Knight #1, and many other Marvel characters including Dr. Strange. Morgan in the Marvel Universe is, in fact, the same antagonist who troubled King Arthur and Merlin back in the times of the Roundtable, so she has some years under her belt. Her clashes with Marvel characters have been pretty epic every time she makes an appearance, even going so far as to change everything in the world back to Medieval times, with the Avengers as her own personal army. Her powers are also staggering as she has the ability to warp reality, travel through time, and use a plethora of magical spells at her disposal. Le Fay would make for an interesting villain for Dr. Strange and would certainly be worth introducing to perhaps use her in a future Avengers onscreen adventure."

=== Accolades ===
- In 2016, CinemaBlend included Morgan le Fay in their "13 Supernatural Marvel Characters Who Should Be Introduced After Doctor Strange" list.
- In 2018, ComicBook.com included Morgan le Fay in their "8 Best Doctor Strange Villains Ever" list.
- In 2019, CBR.com ranked Morgan le Fay 9th in their "21 Most Powerful Sorcerer Supreme Candidates" list and included her in their "Marvel's Most Powerful Female Supervillains" list.
- In 2020, CBR.com ranked Morgan le Fay 5th in their "Top 10 Avengers Villains That Have Yet To Appear On The Big Screen" list and 7th in their "Marvel Comics: 10 Most Powerful Immortal Villains" list.
- In 2021, Looper included Morgan le Fay in their "Marvel's Most Powerful Magic Users" list.
- In 2022, Screen Rant ranked Morgan le Fay 9th in their "10 Smartest Magic Users In Comic Books" list and included her in their "15 Most Powerful Marvel Magic Users (Who Aren't Doctor Strange)" list.
- In 2022, CBR.com ranked Morgan le Fay 10th in their "Marvel: The 10 Strongest Female Villains" list.
- In 2022, Looper ranked Morgan le Fay 12th in their "Doctor Strange's Most Powerful Villains" list.

== Other versions ==
=== Age of Ultron ===
An alternate universe version of Morgan le Fay who conquered half the world following a war between Asgard and Latveria appears in the Age of Ultron storyline.

=== Weirdworld version ===
An alternate universe version of Morgan le Fay from Earth-13238 appears in "Secret Wars" as the ruler of Weirdworld.

== In other media ==
=== Television ===
- An elderly Morgan le Fay makes a cameo appearance in The Super Hero Squad Show episode "Mother of Doom!".
- Morgan le Fay appears in the Ultimate Spider-Man episode "Halloween Night at the Museum", voiced by Grey DeLisle. This version was imprisoned in a suit of armor and is accidentally freed by a group of children. Spider-Man recruits the children's help to distract Morgan long enough for him to magically banish her from Earth.
- The Battleworld incarnation of Morgan le Fay appears in Avengers Assemble, voiced again by Grey DeLisle.
- Morgan le Fay appears in the third season of Runaways, portrayed by Elizabeth Hurley. This version is a powerful enchantress and the leader of a witch coven that was trapped in the Dark Dimension. In the present, she manipulates Nico Minoru into accepting her Wiccan abilities and join her coven to help her escape the Dark Dimension. Upon escaping and acquiring the Darkhold, le Fay enthralls Nico's father Robert, takes over his company WIZARD, and uses its Corvus WizPhones to build an army of slaves while making repeated attempts to steal the Staff of One from Nico. Eventually, the Runaways and Pride foil her plans before Nico's mother Tina re-banishes le Fay to the Dark Dimension.
- Morgan le Fay appears in Marvel Super Hero Adventures, voiced by Nicole Oliver.
- Morgan le Fay appears in the Marvel Future Avengers episode "Out of Time", voiced by Kairi Satake in Japanese and Laura Bailey in English.

=== Film ===
Morgan Le Fay appears in Dr. Strange, portrayed by Jessica Walter.

=== Video games ===
Morgan le Fay appears in Lego Marvel Super Heroes 2, voiced by Kate O'Sullivan.

== See also ==
- Morgan le Fay in popular culture
