= Black Knight (Marvel Comics) =

Comic book character

- Black Knight #1 (May 1955); Cover art by Joe Maneely
- Publisher: Marvel Comics
- First appearance: Black Knight #1 (May 1955)
- Created by: Stan Lee (writer); Joe Maneely (art)
- Characters: Sir Percy; Nathan Garrett; Dane Whitman; Augustine du Lac
- See also: Ebony Blade; The Black Knight lineage

Black Knight

Series publication information
- Publisher: (vol 1); Atlas Comics (vol 2); Marvel Comics
- Schedule: (vol 1); Bi-monthly (vol 2); Monthly
- Format: (vol 1); Ongoing series (vol 2); Limited series
- Genre: (vol 1); Fantasy (vol 2); Superhero, magic in comics
- Publication date: (vol 1); May – December 1955 (vol 2); June – September 1990
- Number of issues: (vol 1); 5 (vol 2); 4
- Main character(s): (both); Sir Percy

The Black Knight is the alias of several fictional characters appearing in American comic books published by Marvel Comics.

The first is a medieval knight created by writer Stan Lee and artist Joe Maneely, who made his first appearance in Black Knight #1 (May 1955), during the Silver Age of Comics, when Marvel Comics was previously known as Atlas Comics. The second is a supervillain descendant of the original, created by Lee and artist and co-plotter Dick Ayers, who first appeared in Tales to Astonish #52 (Feb. 1964). The third, created by writer Roy Thomas, production editor John Verpoorten, and artist George Tuska, is the villain's nephew, a superhero and a member of the superhero team the Avengers, who first appeared in The Avengers #47 (Dec. 1967). A fourth Black Knight with no revealed genetic connection debuted in The Black Panther #3 (June 2005), created by writer Reginald Hudlin and penciler John Romita Jr. A fifth, Jackie Chopra, was revealed to be the daughter of Dane Whitman.

Dane Whitman appears in the live-action Marvel Cinematic Universe film Eternals (2021), portrayed by Kit Harington.

== Publication history ==
Marvel Comics' first Black Knight, Sir Percy of Scandia, first appeared in the medieval-adventure series Black Knight #1–5 (cover-dated May 1955–April 1956) from Atlas Comics, the 1950s precursor to Marvel Comics.

Sir Percy's descendant, Professor Nathan Garrett, debuted as the modern-day supervillain Black Knight in Tales to Astonish #52 (Feb. 1964). This villainous Black Knight appeared in The Avengers #6, #14–15 (July 1964, March–April 1965), and in the feature "Iron Man" in Tales of Suspense #73 (Jan. 1966), in which he was mortally wounded.

Dane Whitman, Garrett's nephew, made his first appearance in The Avengers #47 (Dec. 1967) and became a heroic version of the Black Knight in the subsequent issue. Whitman sporadically appeared with the Avengers until becoming a core member, regularly appearing in #252–300 (1985–1989) and #329–375 (1991–1994).

The Gatherers storyline running through The Avengers #343–375 (1992–1994) placed the spotlight on the Black Knight, as the book's focus turned toward his tumultuous relationship with the Eternal Sersi and mysterious connection to the other-dimensional villain Proctor. Whitman later starred in Malibu Comics' UltraForce #8–10 (1995) and UltraForce vol. 2 #1–12 (1995–1996), leading a new team of heroes on a parallel world. Returning to the Marvel Universe proper, Whitman appeared in Heroes for Hire #1–16 (1997–1998) and, later, Captain Britain and MI13 #1–15 (2008–2009). The Black Knight has yet to return to the Avengers, the team with which the character is most closely associated. In 2015, as part of All-New All-Different, a solo series was launched featuring Dane Whitman; however, it was canceled after 5 issues due to low sales.

Whitman and Sir Percy also starred in the limited series Black Knight #1–4 (June–Sept. 1990), written by Roy and Dann Thomas and drawn by successive pencillers Tony DeZuniga and Rich Buckler. In 1995, Percy had a cameo in Namor #60 as part of the Atlantis Rising story. Whitman and Sersi then headlined the one-shot Black Knight: Exodus (Dec. 1996), written by Ben Raab and illustrated by Jimmy Cheung and Andy Lanning. Another Black Knight one-shot starring Sir Percy, written by Thomas and illustrated by Tom Grummett and Scott Hanna, was published as Mystic Arcana: Black Knight #1 (Sept. 2007), the second of four Mystic Arcana one-shot issues.

== Fictional character biographies ==
=== Sir Percy of Scandia ===
The original Black Knight is Sir Percy of Scandia, a 6th-century knight who serves at the court of King Arthur as his greatest warrior. Recruited by the wizard Merlin, Percy adopts a double identity, and pretends to be very incompetent until changing into the persona of the Black Knight. As the Black Knight, Percy wields the Ebony Blade, which Merlin forged from a meteorite. A constant foe of the evil knight Mordred the Evil (Arthur's traitorous nephew), Percy is eventually killed by him during the fall of Camelot when stabbed from behind with an enchanted blade – although Mordred then dies himself of wounds inflicted by Arthur. Merlin ensures that Percy's spirit will live on by casting a spell that will revive his ghost if Mordred should ever return. Percy's spirit has appeared several times to counsel his descendant, Dane Whitman.

=== Nathan Garrett ===
Biologist Nathan Garrett is the direct descendant of Sir Percy (although it has been implied Percy's nephew Raston inherited the blade), and found Sir Percy's tomb and the Ebony Blade. Garrett's evil tendencies make him unworthy of wielding the sword, and Sir Percy’s ghost shuns him. An embittered Garrett then devises an arsenal of medieval weapons that employ modern technology and has genetic engineers create a winged horse that he names Elendil. Calling himself the Black Knight, Garrett embarks on a life of crime to spite his ancestor. After a battle with the hero Giant-Man Garrett joins the supervillain team the Masters of Evil at the request of master villain Baron Zemo and like the others spreads Adhesive X over the city, but is first defeated by Thor. After two unsuccessful battles with the Avengers, the second time of which he was broken out of jail by Enchantress, he battled Iron Man due to Doctor Doom's mind-control machine (which made supervillains attack Mister Fantastic's and the Invisible Woman's wedding, which the affected villains subsequently forget due to a machine created by Mister Fantastic). Garrett is mortally wounded falling from Aragorn while trying to kill Iron Man. A dying Garrett reveals his secret identity to his nephew, Dane Whitman, and repents for his life of crime. Whitman then adopts the identity of the Black Knight himself.

=== Dane Whitman ===
Dane Whitman is the Black Knight who has been a longtime member of the Avengers as well as a member of the Defenders, Ultraforce, Heroes for Hire, and MI: 13. Using his uncle's notes, Whitman wielded the same equipment and created Aragorn.

=== Augustine du Lac ===
A Vatican Black Knight named Augustine du Lac received the Ebony Blade after Vatican agents retrieved it from an Iraqi vampire nest. In addition, Augustine created his own Aragorn. He is a member of a team of supervillains that invades the African nation of Wakanda. A devout Catholic, du Lac hopes to convert the populace to Catholicism. Black Panther takes the Ebony Blade upon his surrender when ripped off of Aragorn's back and a claim that the Wakandan pilots would fire on Aragorn. Augustine's Aragorn was later captured by Alyosha Kravinoff and killed for food.

=== Female Black Knight ===
A teenage female Black Knight appears in the Vengeance limited series as a member of the Young Masters. Like Garrett, this incarnation is a villain and appears to possess the Ebony Blade. How she came into possession of the sword and what happened to Augustine has yet to be revealed. She was with the Young Masters when they were at an abandoned Hydra base in Pennsylvania. While inspecting Bullseye's corpse, they were attacked by Lady Bullseye. Later targeting Doctor Octopus for "execution", the Young Masters found themselves battling the Sinister Six while being assisted by the Teen Brigade, with Black Knight being assisted in taking down Sandman by Teen Brigade member Ultimate Nullifier.

Black Knight was later seen with the Young Masters as a member of the Masters of Evil, led by Helmut Zemo. She and the Young Masters resided in the Snakepit which is overseen by Constrictor.

=== Jacks Chopra ===
Jackie "Jacks" Chopra is Dane Whitman's previously unknown daughter and an Arthurian history buff. She shares the Black Knight mantle and Ebony Blade with her father so that burden of doing so would not be handled alone.

== The Black Knight lineage ==
Nathan Garrett and Dane Whitman are part of a lineage of Black Knights stretching back to the 6th century. In New Excalibur #10, the first part of the "Last Day of Camelot" storyline, it is revealed that Dane has turned Garrett Castle into a Black Knight museum with various exhibits on the Black Knights, including the body of Sir Percy. There is a long line of paintings of the Knights including, according to the curator, "Sir Ralston[sic] and Sir Eobar or lesser known knights like Sir William and Sir Henry."

These Black Knights are:

- Sir Raston ("Ralston" appears only in New Excalibur #10) – Sir Percy's nephew, who became the Black Knight after him. He lived in the Dark Ages, but was recruited into the Anachronauts by Kang the Conqueror and travelled through time.
- Sir Eobar of Garrington – He was the Black Knight during the Crusades.
- Sir William – He is depicted fighting in the trenches of World War I.
- Sir Henry – He is depicted as a swashbuckling figure.

Later in "The Last Days of Camelot", Sir Percy reveals to Dane that he was not the first Black Knight and that eight knights had carried the Ebony Blade before him, the last being King Arthur's cousin Sir Reginald. Each one had been driven mad by the sword and had to be killed until it was decided there were only three people who could take the sword, but King Arthur and Merlin were needed in other capacities, so the "burden" fell to Sir Percy who accepted despite knowing the risks.

The apparent "Last Knight" is Ernst Wythim, a member of the lineage from around 2600 AD.

== Ebony Blade ==
=== History ===
The Ebony Blade was carved from a meteor and enchanted by Merlin for Sir Percy, the first Black Knight. The Ebony Blade was inflicted with a curse after being used for violence. The sword passed down through the generations, eventually being given to Percy's descendant Dane Whitman. Whitman used the blade for many years. It passed briefly to Valkyrie when Dane's body was turned to stone. Whitman eventually gave up the Ebony Blade by driving it deep into the same meteor that it was forged from, now kept in his castle. Only another deemed worthy would be able to withdraw it.

Sean Dolan, Dane's ex-squire, draws the Ebony Blade during an attack on Whitman's castle and becomes Bloodwraith. Dolan overcomes the curse and is able to give up the sword for a brief time. During this time, the Ebony Blade was trapped in the Negative Zone barrier outside of Attilan. In the meantime, a second Ebony Blade was acquired by Proctor, an alternate reality version of Whitman. Dolan was drawn to this second Blade, and once again became Bloodwraith.

=== Powers and abilities ===
The Ebony Blade is a powerful enchanted weapon. It is said to be indestructible, and only the extremely powerful Iron Ogre, a magic creature, could split it in half. The blade has many mystical or quasi-mystical capabilities, including the ability to cut through any physical substance with the exception of other enchanted weapons and extremely strong metals like adamantium, absorb energy, absorb souls to empower itself, and guard against mystic energy. The Blade bonds to its wielder in such a way that they can summon it using a mystical ceremony if it is ever lost. The sword also gives its users a state of resurrective immortality; if the wielder were to fall in battle, a blood offering of sorts can be used to restore them to life.

=== Curses and influences ===
The Ebony Blade was afflicted with a blood curse due to all the blood the original Black Knight had spilled. Dane Whitman eventually purged the Blade of its curse at Doctor Strange's behest by plunging it into the Brazier of Truth while Strange bathed them both in magic fire. The curse returned, however, when the Sub-Mariner used it to kill his wife Marrina Smallwood. The curse seems to affect different people in different ways. It turned Whitman into a statue, it amplified Proctor's gann'josin-based powers, and it granted Sean Dolan great physical powers as Bloodwraith.

The Blade was sometimes known to subtly compel Whitman to do things or go places that were tied to its previous wielders, as well. It was revealed by the symbiote god Knull that its power relies on the curse. It thrives on the negative proclivities of flawed and imperfect wielders to maximize its inherent power, something that only the unworthy can utilize as its edge dulls when wielded by a chivalrous soul.

=== Fake Ebony Blade ===
On occasion, the Ebony Blade appears in two separate comic series simultaneously, most notably in 2006 when it was in use by Dane Whitman (Black Knight) in the New Excalibur series whilst it was in use in a Black Panther ongoing by another Black Knight and subsequently Black Panther.

In a 2006 interview, when addressing a question about the confusion of the Ebony Blades appearing in two comics, Marvel Comics' editor Nick Lowe had this response:

The Black Knight in Black Panther wasn't ya' boy, Dane Whitman. It was an imposter who stole the sword from Dane. Now, since the imposter wasn't an idiot, he knew that if he outright stole the sword, Dane would come looking for it. So he replaced it with a different sword, so Dane didn't even know it was missing. We're touching on this in New Excalibur #14–15.

Writer Paul Cornell revealed a full explanation within the Captain Britain series, having Dracula replace Dane Whitman's blade with a fake version at some point between The Avengers vol. 3 #37 and New Excalibur #10. This fake blade has a vampire fang within it, which has shown some signs of sentience. Even after Whitman first realized that the Ebony Blade was fake, it affected his memories so that he forgot its true nature.

Upon learning that the blade was fake for the second time in #7 of that series, Whitman retrieved the real blade from Wakanda.

== Other versions ==
=== Earth X ===
An original incarnation of the Black Knight, Ahura, appears in Earth X. This version took up the mantle after Dane Whitman was petrified by the Grey Gargoyle.

=== Marvel 2099 ===
An unidentified future incarnation of the Black Knight appears the Marvel 2099 story Spider-Man 2099: Exodus #3. This version is a member of the Masters of Evil who joined them in slaughtering the Avengers and conquering planets until he disobeys his leader Baron Zemo, who kills him for doing so.

=== Marvel Zombies ===
A zombified alternate universe version of Dane Whitman / Black Knight makes a minor appearance in the Marvel Zombies tie-in one-shot Marvel Zombies: Dead Days.

=== Ultimate Marvel ===
Two incarnations of the Black Knight appear in stories set in the Ultimate Marvel imprint:

- The first, Alex, appears in The Ultimates 2 and New Ultimates as an overweight member of the Defenders who resembles a LARPer. He gained his enhanced durability from Loki under the alias of Gunner Golman.
- The second, Dane Whitman, appears in Ultimate Comics: The Ultimates as a quadriplegic former Marine Corps corporal who was intended to join the Ultimates before eventually being recruited into the New Ultimates after Nick Fury had put him through a process that left him almost a robot.

== In other media ==
=== Television ===
- The Nathan Garrett incarnation of the Black Knight appears in The Marvel Super Heroes, voiced by Len Carlson. This version is a member of Baron Heinrich Zemo's Masters of Evil.
- The Sir Percy incarnation of the Black Knight appears in the Spider-Man and His Amazing Friends episode "Knights & Demons", voiced by Vic Perrin. Dane Whitman was also meant to appear, but was rejected to avoid confusion.
- The Augustine du Lac incarnation of the Black Knight appears in Black Panther, voiced by JB Blanc.
- The Nathan Garrett incarnation of the Black Knight appears in Iron Man: Armored Adventures, voiced by Alistair Abell. This version is a Maggia enforcer serving under Count Nefaria.
- The Dane Whitman incarnation of the Black Knight makes a non-speaking cameo appearance in The Avengers: Earth's Mightiest Heroes episode "Come the Conqueror".

=== Film ===
Dane Whitman appears in Eternals (2021), portrayed by Kit Harington.

=== Video games ===
- The Dane Whitman incarnation of the Black Knight appears as a playable character in Marvel: Avengers Alliance.
- The Nathan Garrett, Dane Whitman, and Augustine du Lac incarnations of the Black Knight appear in Lego Marvel's Avengers, with Garrett and Whitman appearing in the "Masters of Evil" DLC pack while Du Lac appears in the "Black Panther" DLC pack.
- A teenage version of Dane Whitman / Black Knight appears as a playable character in Marvel Avengers Academy, voiced by Ian Russell.
- The Dane Whitman, Sir Percy, and Nathan Garrett incarnations of the Black Knight appear as unlockable characters in Lego Marvel Super Heroes 2.

== Collected editions ==
There are several collected editions of the comic issues featuring the different incarnations of the Black Knight:

- Collected editions featuring Sir Percy
- Collected editions featuring Dane Whitman
