= Dreadknight =

Fictional character appearing in American comic books

- Dreadknight as depicted in Iron Man #102 (September 1977). Art by George Pérez.

Publication information
- Publisher: Marvel Comics
- First appearance: Iron Man #101 (August 1977)
- Created by: Bill Mantlo; George Tuska

In-story information
- Alter ego: Bram Velsing
- Species: Human
- Team affiliations: Frightful Four; Masters of Evil
- Abilities: Gifted scientist Rides the "Hellhorse"; Use of weapons Steel alloy body armor grants: Superhuman strength and durability

Dreadknight (Bram Velsing) is a supervillain appearing in American comic books published by Marvel Comics. He was a Latverian scientist who was bio-fused to a skull-like metal helmet for conspiring against Doctor Doom and became a knight-like villain who intends to take vengeance on Doom.

== Publication history ==
The character first appeared in Iron Man #101 (Aug. 1977) and was created by writer Bill Mantlo and penciller George Tuska.

== Fictional character biography ==
Bram Velsing is a Latverian scientist, unsatisfied with serving Doctor Doom whom he referred to as a "grotesque mockery of a man" and thought himself as his superior. Upon learning of Velsing's treacherous ideals, Doom grafts a skull-like metal helmet to his head using a bio-fusion device, scarring him as a way to make him even with Doom. Velsing flees and comes under the care of Victoria Frankenstein, who nurses him back to health. Velsing gains a variety of weapons and rides the "Hellhorse", a bat-winged horse created by Frankenstein using Black Knight's horse Elendil. Calling himself Dreadknight, Velsing attempts to force more resources from Frankenstein to defeat Doom, but is defeated by Iron Man and Frankenstein's Monster and rendered comatose.

Dreadknight is revived by the mystical villains Morgan Le Fay and Mordred and menaces Captain Britain, Victoria Bentley, and Sean Dolan. He is defeated by Dane Whitman.

Dreadknight appears as a member of Wizard's incarnation of the Frightful Four alongside Trapster and Man-Bull. In their attempt to capture a physicist named Dr. Cargill, the Frightful Four are defeated by Spider-Man and Cargill's daughter Turbine.

During the "One World Under Doom" storyline, Dreadknight joins Mad Thinker's incarnation of the Masters of Evil and assists them in invading the Impossible City. After battling the Masters of Evil alongside Captain America, the Impossible City resets itself, freeing it from the group's control.

== Powers and abilities ==
Bram Velsing is a skilled scientist with skills as an engineer.

=== Equipment ===
Dreadknight wears a steel alloy body armor granting him superhuman strength and durability. He uses a power lance capable of projecting energy blasts; electrified steel cable bolas; miniature missiles; and also uses a carbon dioxide pistol that fires concentrated nerve gas which can render opponents unconscious or kill them.

Dreadknight rides the "Hellhorse", a demonic mutated horse.

== Other versions ==
=== Mini-Marvel ===
An alternate universe version of Dreadknight appears in Mini Marvels.

=== Ultimate Marvel ===
An alternate universe version of Dreadknight from Earth-1610 appears in Ultimate Comics: Armor Wars. This version is German and wields armor based on Iron Man's designs.

== In other media ==
=== Television ===
- Dreadknight and his Hellhorse, Nightwing, appears in Iron Man, voiced by Neil Dickson.
- A legion of Dreadknights appear in the Iron Man: Armored Adventures episode "Ancient History 101". They are depicted as stone statues created by the Mandarin to guard one of his Makluan rings and test his potential successors' wisdom.

=== Merchandise ===
- Toy Biz produced a Dreadknight action figure for the Iron Man animated series tie-in line.
- A figure of Dreadknight was released for the Marvel Super Hero Squad line in The Danger of Dreadknight four-pack, packaged with two figures of Iron Man and one of the Mandarin.
- A figure of Dreadknight is included in the San Diego Comic-Con exclusive Marvel Legends "The Raft" box set.
