= Mordred (disambiguation) =

Mordred is the son and usurper of King Arthur in the Arthurian legend.

Mordred may also refer to:

- Mordred (band), an American thrash/funk metal band from San Francisco
- Mordred (comics), a Marvel Comics character, enemy of the Black Knight
- Modred the Mystic, another Marvel Comics character
- Mordred Deschain, a character from Stephen King's The Dark Tower series
- Mordred, a character from Fate/Apocrypha as Saber of Red
