= Evel =

Evel, Ével, or EVEL may refer to:

== People ==
- Evel Knievel (1938–2007), American stunt performer
- Evel Dick (Richard Louis Donato, born 1963), American winner of the reality game show Big Brother 8

== Other uses ==
- Ével, a river in France
- EVEL, or English votes for English laws, a parliamentary procedure used to address aspects of the West Lothian question in the UK parliament
- Evel Rabbati, a tractate in the Babylonian Talmud

== See also ==
- Bejtyl Evel Mosque, a mosque in Tirana, Albania
- Christmas EveL, a 2021 single album by the South Korean boy band Stray Kids
- Evel Knievel (disambiguation)
- Evil (disambiguation)
