= Mystic Arcana =

2007 Marvel storyline series

- Cover of Mystic Arcana: Sister Grimm 1 (Jan 2008), art by Marko Djurdjevic
- Publisher: Marvel Comics
- Publication date: August 2007 – January 2008
- Genre: Superhero; Magic
Title(s)
Mystic Arcana: Black Knight #1
Mystic Arcana: Magik #1
Mystic Arcana: Scarlet Witch #1
Mystic Arcana: Sister Grimm #1
- Main character(s): Magik; Black Knight; Scarlet Witch; Nico Minoru

Creative team
- Writer(s): Louise Simonson; Roy Thomas; Jeff Parker; C. B. Cebulski
- Penciller(s): Steve Scott; Tom Grummett; Scott Hanna; Juan Santacruz; Phil Noto
- Hardcover: ISBN 0-7851-2719-4

Mystic Arcana is a 2007 Marvel Comics storyline published as a series of four one-shot titles. Each book in the series contains an individual main story followed by a back-up story with a plot that continues through all four books. The main story in each book focuses on a different fictional character, each of whom has had associations with magic in previous Marvel publications. The four characters featured are Magik, the Black Knight, the Scarlet Witch, and Sister Grimm. Artist Marko Djurdjevic illustrated the cover for each issue.

== History ==
Prior to the release of the series, Marvel.com reporter Jim Beard reported that Mystic Arcana would be in the same vein as "the wild and woolly genre revitalization, Annihilation." As part of his report Beard interviewed Mystic Arcana's editor Mark Paniccia who explained:

What makes [Mystic Arcana] unique is the fact that we're not only focusing on Marvel's magical characters, but also the realm in which they operate, much like Annihilation did with the cosmic characters. We're exploring and revealing things about magical objects and heroes that expand and enhance Marvel's already extant magic community.

When the Mystic Arcana series was introduced at the 2007 New York Comic Convention in New York City at the Marvel Comics "Cup 'O Joe" panel, Marvel editor-in-chief Joe Quesada announced that the series would be published under the creative control of Tarot deck artist David Sexton.

In an interview at Comic Book Resources, creative director David Sexton gave an in-depth view of his goals for the Mystic Arcana series:

Not so long ago, there was a magic based mini-series (which I won't name) that climaxed in a battle between a good wizard and an evil wizard. After the evil wizard head-butted the good wizard, it cast a spell on some innocent bystanders by pointing its evil wizard finger at them and uttering that most famous of magical phrases, 'Bang!' Reading that sequence kind of crystallized some of the things I had been thinking about regarding magic in comics. Magic is not a gun. It should look and feel different from technology or from a mutant power. Magic should be depicted in an imaginative manner. Magic only exists in our shared imaginations, so a writer needs to provide that kind of convincing detail in order for the reader to 'believe' in what they're reading...The rules have gotten rather mushy, but 'The Magic Gun Syndrome' can be stopped. If a character or a creature manipulates magic in a new and different way, fantastic, but the reader needs to understand how. The magic has to make sense. Not rational sense, but it should have what Jung referred to as 'Mythopoeic' meaning."

== Format ==
Each issue of Mystic Arcana contains a 22-page main story, and a 10-page back-up story. The main stories in each revolve around the introduction of one of four different groups of "mystical implements" (which Beard describes as "pillars of the [Marvel] Universe" and David Sexton calls the "Cornerstones of Creation"). The back-up stories focus on the quest of Ian McNee, one time Dr. Strange adversary, to collect one implement from each of the Cornerstones of Creation.

Individual issues of the Mystic Arcana series correspond to one of the four classical Greek elements and features a different Marvel character. Additionally, David Sexton explains,"the series is called Mystic Arcana because the Minor Arcana of the Tarot will serve as the unifying element to the stories." Sexton cites the character Magik as the representative of the Tarot minor arcana suit of swords, Black Knight for the suit of pentacles, Scarlet Witch for the suit of cups, and Nico Minoru for the suit of wands. Information on the focus of each issue and their different creative teams is as follows:

- Mystic Arcana Book I: Air (focusing on Illyana Rasputin/Magik). Author: Louise Simonson. Pencils: Steve Scott.
- Mystic Arcana Book II: Earth (focusing on Sir Percy of Scandia, the Black Knight). Author: Roy Thomas (with plotting assist by Jean-Marc Lofficier). Pencils: Tom Grummett & Scott Hanna.
- Mystic Arcana Book III: Water (focusing on Wanda Maximoff/The Scarlet Witch). Author: Jeff Parker. Pencils: Juan Santacruz.
- Mystic Arcana Book IV: Fire (focusing on Nico Minoru/Sister Grimm) Author: C. B. Cebulski. Pencils: Phil Noto.

A fifth book, The Marvel Tarot, which is related to, but separate from the four issue series, focuses on Ian McNee with various Marvel archetypal characters appearing on Tarot Cards. The Marvel Tarot was written and illustrated by David Sexton with Doug Sexton and Jeff Christiansen.

== Plot ==
=== Mystic Arcana: Magik ===
Former New Mutants writer Louise Simonson's one-shot "Time Trial" features Illyana Rasputin and Egyptian sorceress Ashake, with minor appearances by Danielle Moonstar, alias Mirage, of the New Mutants and Egyptian necromancer Heka-Nut. The story takes place during the events of New Mutants #32, during which Magik misguides one of her teleportation discs through the space-time continuum and strands the pair in ancient Egypt. Mirage and Magik are immediately beset by guards but rescued by Ashake, who reveals herself to be the grandmother of Ororo Munroe, alias Storm, though many generations removed. While Mirage sleeps under the cover of an invisibility spell, necromancer Heka-Nut captures Ashake and Magik and forces them to retrieve a mystical artifact called the "Sword of Bone," with which he intends to pursue his own selfish ends. After retrieving the Sword of Bone, Magik disrupts Heka-Nut with her Soulsword, and severs him from his mystical energy; Ashake bottles Heka-Nut's energy in a canopic jar given to her by Egyptian goddess Ma'at. Ashake returns the Sword of Bone to its hiding place under the watch of Ma'at's sphinx servant Ammut and swears to hide Heka-Nut's bottled energy, while Magik and Mirage return home. "In 'The Mystic Arcana Book I: Air,' readers are introduced to a very special deck of Tarot cards [called The First Tarot]. The cards are magically connected with the world around them and they magically transform to represent the "real person" (i.e. Marvel character) that most embodies that particular card."

=== Mystic Arcana: Black Knight ===
Roy Thomas' one-shot, simply titled "The Black Knight," takes place in Avalon during the 6th century A.D. The wizard Merlin finds Sir Percy of Scandia, the Black Knight of Marvel's Arthurian era, at the end of a battle and informs Percy that King Arthur is holding off an attack by his nephew Mordred alone at Percy's castle in Scandia. Percy rushes to Arthur's rescue, but arrives in time to see Arthur fatally wounded by Mordred. As Percy avenges his fallen king, he recalls an encounter with Welsh god Gwyn ap Nudd, a hunter spirit and harbinger of spring, during which Gwyn predicted that Percy would become a warrior and "the hand of fate." The story then progresses to detail how Percy came to be the Black Knight under Merlin's supervision. When the narrative returns to the present, Percy has bested all the insurgent warriors save for Mordred, who hides behind a tapestry and prepares to assassinate Percy from behind. Percy senses Mordred and purposely turns his back to lure the traitor from his hiding place, but Merlin conjures two visions for Percy to consider in the moments before Mordred makes his attack. The first vision shows Percy murdered but the mantle of the Black Knight remains untainted, while the second vision shows Percy defeating Mordred, but the mantle of the Black Knight is corrupted. Percy chooses to let Mordred kill him, thus ensuring that his legacy remains clean, and is rewarded by becoming the new visage of Gwyn ap Nudd.

=== Mystic Arcana: Scarlet Witch ===
Jeff Parker and Juan Santacruz tell a story of Wanda Maximoff when she was a Gypsy child. She meets Gregor and Maria Russoff, Lilia Calderu (queen of the Gypsies, wearing the Serpent Crown) and Margali Szardos who get attacked by Taboo (owner of the Darkhold) and Damballah.

=== Mystic Arcana: Sister Grimm ===
Nico Minoru discovers her family's heirloom, the Black Mirror, which was stolen from Marie LeVeau. The mirror is the last piece of the mystic "Cornerstones of Creation." Unbeknownst to Nico, the mirror itself is not the cornerstone, but the dark reflection it casts is. Only Nico's blood can activate the mirror and release the true cornerstone, the last page from the Darkhold.

=== Ian McNee subplot ===
In Mystic Arcana: Magik, McNee's journey begins in the mystical Serpent's Sea as he is drowning and freezing to death; he claims to be ignorant of who sent him there or why they want him dead. He invokes the deity Oshtur and she offers to save him if he helps to restore the magician Heka-Nut, the villain of Ashake and Magik's quest, with mystical power to save the magical realms. Ian agrees and Oshtur charges him to find the Cornerstones of Creation, the "aces" of the First Tarot. He begins by locating the sphinx Ammut, disguised as an ordinary woman, and invokes a contest for possession of the Sword of Bone: Ammut will pose a riddle to McNee, and if McNee guesses correctly, Ammut surrenders the Sword, but if McNee guesses incorrectly, Ammut will eat McNee's mind. McNee guesses correctly and gains the Sword of Bone, the Cornerstone of Air, disguised as a sword-shaped pendant on a necklace. Ammut then informs McNee his next task is to retrieve the Ebony Rose, the Cornerstone of Earth, from Morgan Le Fay.

Mystic Arcana: Black Knight finds McNee fighting his way into Avalon to meet Morgan Le Fay. He finally arrives and respectfully pleads with Le Fay to hand over the Rose for the sake of the magical universe. Le Fay discovers that McNee used a charm to make his voice sound more like her (Le Fay's) former mentor and lover Merlin in order to sway her more easily. She concludes that not only does McNee sound like Merlin, but he also acts "mischievous" like Merlin, and out of respect for the old wizard's memory, Le Fay tells Ian where he can find the Ebony Rose. Ian retrieves it, and Le Fay tells him that he will next travel beneath the ocean to a place she "once believed was Avalon," guarded by an old serpent, where McNee will presumably seek the Cornerstone of Water. Unlike in the McNee subplot in Mystic Arcana: Magik, the second chapter of McNee's quest does not directly correlate to the objects or events in the main story.

In Mystic Arcana: Scarlet Witch McNee fights Nagala and Llyra to recover the Serpent Crown.

In Mystic Arcana: Sister Grimm McNee is quietly working in his shop when Marie LeVeau steps in. LeVeau gives a gift that he reluctantly accepts. It is the last page of the infamous Darkhold she received from the Dark Mirror. LeVeau states that she has turned a new leaf and wants to help Ian. With that, she disappears in a cloud of smoke. Almost immediately after, the Bright Lady appears and instructs Ian to perform the ritual. Ian questions Oshtur's choice of him to perform the task, stating that perhaps Dr. Strange would be better suited to the spell. Oshtur urges him to complete the spell and Ian finally agrees. Once the Cornerstones are gathered, Ian begins by connecting to the guardians of the other three cornerstones, Llyra, Morgan Le Fay, and Ashake. After Ian successfully breaks the spell containing the essence of Heka-Nut, Oshtur finally reveals that she is in fact not Oshtur, but the Darklord Chthon. Chthon reveals his plans of world domination using the four cornerstones, at which point Ian and the others counter Chthon's deception and begin to attack him. Ashake pleads with Heka-Nut to remember his humanity and the goodness that is within him. They rekindle their friendship and Ashake releases his soul from Ian's body by slicing through his spirit with the Sword of Bone. With the spell broken, the sorcerers are released from the chaotic swirl of mystic energy. Somehow, Ashake is pulled from her timeline into the present. Chthon tells Ian that because he used the Darkhold's magic to restore the balance between the cornerstones, he tainted his soul and part of it now belongs to Chthon. Ian loses a part of his soul and Ashake is now "lost" in the present. At this point, the real Oshtur reveals herself and tells the heroes that all is not lost and the balance in magic must truly be restored. She instructs them to rest, as they will be the sorcerers charged with restoring that balance.

== Collected editions ==
The series has been collected into a single 264 page volume which collects Mystic Arcana: Magik, Mystic Arcana: Black Knight, Mystic Arcana: Scarlet Witch, Mystic Arcana: Sister Grimm, Official Tarot of the Marvel Universe and The Official Handbook of the Marvel Universe: Mystic Arcana.

- Hardcover (December 2007, ISBN 0-7851-2719-4)
- Softcover (June 2008, ISBN 0-7851-2720-8)
