= Black Knight (Nathan Garrett) =

Nathan Garrett Black Knight
- Black Knight as depicted in Tales of Suspense #73 (Jan. 1966). Cover art by Gene Colan.

Publication information
- Publisher: Marvel Comics
- First appearance: Tales to Astonish #52 (Feb. 1964)
- Created by: Stan Lee; Dick Ayers

In-story information
- Species: Human
- Team affiliations: Masters of Evil; Legion of the Unliving
- Abilities: Genius-level intellect; Expertise in biology, genetics, and electrical engineering; Expert equestrian; Rides a flying horse; Utilizes advanced weaponry

Nathan Garrett is a character appearing in American comic books published by Marvel Comics. He operated as the criminal Black Knight as a descendant of the original Black Knight, and was created by writer-editor Stan Lee and artist and co-plotter Dick Ayers.

== Publication history ==
Professor Nathan Garrett debuted as the modern-day supervillain Black Knight in Tales to Astonish #52 (Feb. 1964). This villainous Black Knight appeared in The Avengers #6, 14-15 (July 1964, March–April 1965), and in the "Iron Man" feature in Tales of Suspense #73 (Jan. 1966), in which he was mortally wounded.

== Fictional character biography ==
Professor Nathan Garrett is the distant direct descendant of Sir Percy, and was born in London, England. He becomes a biologist, research scientist, and university professor. He then became the head of an espionage ring and was captured by the hero Giant-Man. Garrett fled to Europe where he found Sir Percy's tomb and the Ebony Blade. Garrett's evil tendencies make him unworthy of wielding the sword and he is shunned by Sir Percy's ghost. The embittered Garrett then devises an arsenal of medieval weapons that employ modern technology (including a lance that fired bolts of energy) and genetically engineers and creates a winged horse called Elendil. Calling himself the "Black Knight", Garrett embarks on a career as a professional criminal to spite his ancestor. He battled Giant-Man again and the Wasp, but is defeated.

Garrett joins the supervillain team known as the Masters of Evil at the request of Baron Heinrich Zemo as the counterpart to Giant-Man, and spreads Adhesive X over the city. However, with the help of jailed villain Paste-Pot Pete, the Avengers find an antidote and the Teen Brigade apply it to the containers, causing it to free the people. The Black Knight is defeated by Thor as Captain America had decided to catch the Masters of Evil off guard by the Avengers 'switching' foes.

The Black Knight was among the villains assembled by Doctor Doom using the Emotion Charger to destroy the Fantastic Four at the time when Mister Fantastic and Invisible Woman were getting married. Amidst the superhero guests getting involved in fighting the villains, Black Knight chased after Daredevil. Mister Fantastic uses a device given to him by Uatu the Watcher to teleport the villains away with no memory of what happened.

Garrett kidnaps Happy Hogan and falls from his winged horse while trying to kill Iron Man. Mortally wounded, Garrett summons his nephew Dane Whitman to their family estate, reveals his secret identity and repents for his life of crime, with Whitman becoming the next Black Knight. Elendil is found by Victoria Frankenstein, mutated into a monstrous form, and later becomes the steed of Dreadknight.

After his death, Garrett is resurrected by Immortus as a member of the Legion of the Unliving. He battled Hank Pym once more, and "dies" again.

== Powers and abilities ==
Nathan Garrett was a normal man with gifted intelligence. He had a Ph.D. in genetics, was a brilliant biologist specializing in genetic engineering, and was a skilled electrical engineer as well.

Garrett created a power-lance which fired heat beams, electrical charges, and concussive electromagnetic force beams. He also used a rope as a lasso, steel cables as bolas, red-hot spinning metal discs, and electrical energy-drainers which resembled doughnuts. He carried a paralyzer pistol which fired nerve gas that could paralyze or kill an opponent. He wore body armor made of an unknown steel alloy.

He was a skilled equestrian, and rode a winged black horse that he created by genetic engineering.

== Reception ==
- In 2022, CBR.com ranked Nathan Garrett 10th in their "Black Knight's 10 Strongest Villains" list.

== Other versions ==
An alternate universe version of Black Knight appears in Heroes Reborn as a member of Loki's Masters of Evil. He is killed by Doctor Doom after trying to gain an "audience" with him.

== In other media ==
=== Television ===
- Nathan Garrett appears in The Marvel Super Heroes, voiced by Len Carlson. This version is a member of Heinrich Zemo's Masters of Evil.
- Nathan Garrett appears in Iron Man: Armored Adventures, voiced by Alistair Abell. This version is a Maggia enforcer under Count Nefaria.

=== Video games ===
- Nathan Garrett appears as a playable character in Lego Marvel's Avengers via the Masters of Evil DLC pack.
- Nathan Garrett appears in Lego Marvel Super Heroes 2.

=== Miscellaneous ===
Nathan Garrett appears in The Avengers: United They Stand #4.
