= Black Knight (Dane Whitman) =

Comic book superhero

Dane Whitman Black Knight
- Black Knight as depicted in Empyre: Avengers vol 1 #3 (August 2020). Art by Paul Renaud.

Publication information
- Publisher: Marvel Comics
- First appearance: The Avengers #47 (December 1967)
- Created by: Roy Thomas; John Buscema

In-story information
- Alter ego: Dane Whitman
- Team affiliations: Heroes for Hire; The Defenders; Masters of Evil; The Avengers; New Avalon; Euroforce; Excalibur; MI-13
- Notable aliases: The Pendragon; Phoenix Knight; Black Knight; Bloodwraith
- Abilities: Expert hand-to-hand combatant; Genius physicist and geneticist; Adept strategist and tactician; Excellent swordsman; Expert equestrian; Magic knowledge; Equipment includes: Enchanted necklace summoning a sword, a shield, and armor; Ebony Blade

The Black Knight (Dane Whitman) is a superhero appearing in American comic books published by Marvel Comics. Created by writer Roy Thomas and artist John Buscema, the character first appeared in The Avengers #47 (December 1967). Dane Whitman is the third character to use the codename of Black Knight. He is the descendant of the original Black Knight and is the nephew of the supervillain Black Knight. He inherited a mystical sword which carried a curse and took the Black Knight mantle to help restore honor. The character has also been a member of the MI-13, Avengers, Defenders, Ultraforce, and Heroes for Hire at various points in his history.

Since his original introduction in comics, the character has been featured in various other Marvel-licensed products, including video games, animated television series, and merchandise. Dane Whitman made his live-action debut in the Marvel Cinematic Universe (MCU) film Eternals (2021), portrayed by Kit Harington.

== Publication history ==
The Avengers #48 (Jan. 1968) Cover art by George Tuska.

Dane Whitman debuted in The Avengers #47 (December 1967), created by Roy Thomas and John Buscema.

Thomas commented on the character's conception, "The Black Knight was a combination, visually, of the Black Knight that Stan Lee and Joe Maneely made up in the mid-1950s, with the concept Stan Lee and Jack Kirby had done as a villain of that name, complete with winged horse, in The Avengers. There was also a bit of an homage in there to a DC hero I'd liked in the 1940s, Shining Knight. I shouldn't have named his horse Aragorn, though. I wasn't even that great an admirer of The Lord of the Rings. John Buscema, was scheduled to be the artist of the story that introduced Dane Whitman dressed in the Black Knight costume into The Avengers, but that wound up being a guest stint by George Tuska when Stan Lee took John off the book for one issue to do something else. It was John Verpoorten and I that designed the costume."

Following his introduction, the Dane Whitman Black Knight became a recurring character in the superhero-team comic The Avengers, with his first solo story appearing shortly afterward in Marvel Super-Heroes #17 (Nov. 1968). From 1979 to 1980, the Black Knight also appeared in a black and white feature in the Marvel UK comic Hulk Weekly, where the feature was to be the longest-lasting of the comic's UK-originated material, appearing in the majority of the title's 63 issues. It was written by Steve Parkhouse with art by Paul Neary and John Stokes. During the mid-1980s his popularity in The Avengers led to fan requests for his own miniseries, but Marvel instead scheduled a three-part Black Knight story set during the Crusades for Marvel Fanfare. The Marvel Fanfare story was extensively delayed, and in the end was published concurrently with the miniseries Black Knight #1–4 (June–Sept. 1990) by husband-and-wife writers Roy and Dann Thomas and successive pencillers Tony DeZuniga and Rich Buckler. This was followed by the one-shot Black Knight: Exodus #1 (Dec. 1996), by writer Ben Raab and penciller Jimmy Cheung.

He and other Marvel characters were brought to the short-lived Ultraverse imprint. The Black Knight appeared in the Ultraforce team book volumes 1 and 2 and related titles in 1995–96. Then the character became part of the teams: Heroes for Hire (1997), Excalibur (2003), MI-13 (2008) and Euroforce.

In July 2015, it was announced that Frank Tieri and Luca Pizzari would be launching a new Black Knight series as part of Marvel's post-"Secret Wars" relaunch. This series features Whitman as the ruler of New Avalon, a kingdom he has claimed in the reality known as Weirdworld. The ongoing series was cancelled with issue #5 in 2016, as Marvel was unhappy with its sales. The writer of the series, Frank Tieri, then considered it a standalone limited series and expressed his feelings over the series being cut short. Black Knight is notable as the first "All-New, All-Different Marvel" comic book series to be cancelled.

== Fictional character biography ==
=== Early life ===
Dane Whitman was born in Gloucester, Massachusetts to a rich family. In his youth, he studied physics. Whitman is best known as the modern-day Black Knight, continuing a legacy that began in medieval England. The first Black Knight, Whitman's ancestor Sir Percy of Scandia, lived during the reign of King Arthur. Percy's murder at the hand of his nemesis Mordred began a string of successors, all of them Percy's descendants.

The Black Knight's legacy is revived by Whitman's uncle Nathan Garrett who becomes the supervillain Black Knight. After being mortally wounded during a battle with Iron Man, he escapes to his estate, summons his nephew to confess his crimes and asks him to restore honor to their family legacy and atone for Garrett's misdeeds, giving Whitman the weapons that he used for crime.

=== The Avengers ===
Whitman becomes the Black Knight, using the horse Aragorn for his mount. He uses the genetic techniques of his uncle to give the horse the appearance of a winged horse. During his first outing, he is mistaken for his uncle and attacked by the Avengers, though they eventually realize their mistake. He later infiltrates the Masters of Evil, proving his worth to the Avengers who offer him provisional membership. Shortly afterwards, he inherits Castle Garrett and travels to England. He encounters the spirit of Sir Percy of Scandia there and is given the Ebony Blade. Black Knight then encounters Doctor Strange and helps fight the extra-dimensional threat Tiboro.

Marvel Super-Heroes #17 (Nov. 1968). Black Knight figure by John Romita Sr.; background art by Howard Purcell (penciller) and Dan Adkins (inker), from page 14 of story.

While still a provisional Avenger, he helps them in a battle against Kang the Conqueror. Kang was given the power of death over the Avengers by the Grandmaster as a prize for winning a recent game that Whitman has become unwittingly involved in. When he assists Goliath (Hawkeye) in defeating his chosen opponent, the Grandmaster calls that round of the game a draw since the Avengers did not defeat their opponents on their own. Since Whitman is not a full Avenger at the time, Kang has no power over him and so Whitman is able to defeat him with relative ease. Whitman then officially joins the Avengers in recognition of his aid. Later, the Ebony Blade is used by the Olympian war god Ares to put out the Promethean Flame and turn most of the Olympians to crystal. The Black Knight travels to Olympus with other members and helps defeat Ares.

=== The Defenders and Otherworld ===
Whitman is an early member of the Defenders. He was traveling with the Enchantress to the realm of the Asgardian sorceress Casiolena, to a parallel dimension. However, they were captured and imprisoned by the witch. When the Defenders also are trapped by Casiolena, the Black Knight and a newly invoked Valkyrie joins them in the battle against Casiolena. However Whitman becomes the first casualty of the Defenders, after he is treacherously converted to stone by a kiss from the Enchantress. Doctor Strange tries to revert the spell without success. Whitman's spirit is drawn to the 12th century by the sorcerer Amergin the Druid, and he takes spiritual possession of his ancestor, the Crusader Sir Eobar Garrington, until Garrington dies due to the Evil Eye. Meanwhile, Whitman chooses to stay in the 12th century. Whitman then battles the Fomor, alongside the time-traveling Avengers. He then employs the Evil Eye to seal the portal between Earth and Avalon.

Some time later, still in Garrington's body, the wizard Merlyn takes Whitman as his champion. He is commanded to find the hero Captain Britain, who is wandering in the coast of Cornwall. Merlyn needs the hero for the defense of Otherworld, his realm, that is being attacked by the Nethergods. The Black Knight is attacked many times by creatures invoked by the sorcerer Mordred but he finds Captain Britain, who is amnesiac. On the road to Otherworld, both heroes are assisted by the old witch Sarah Mumford, the Walker Vortigern, an old king of Britain, and the elf Moondog, the last two sent by Merlyn from Otherworld. On the road, they are attacked by the Iron Ogre, a magic creature invoked by the Evil Walker Cormac. The Ogre bests the heroes and destroys the Ebony Blade. Only a precise arrow shot by the elf Moondog stops the creature. Cormac sends Goblins to battle the heroes and briefly captures Moondog. Meanwhile, when the Black Knight is devastated by the loss of his sword, he meets the Lady of the Lake, who gives him the magic sword Excalibur. With the sword, Whitman defeats Cormac. In the meantime, Captain Britain is killed by the White Rider, one of the servants of the Nethergod Mandrac, at the door of the passage of Otherworld Whitman and his companions finally cross the doors of Otherworld and fight Mandrac, Lord of the Slain, who was in possession of the body of Captain Britain. Merlyn appears to help the knight and traps Mandrac inside the earth - Merlyn rescues the spirit of Captain Britain from Netherword and defeats Modred, who was attacking him and the knight. In the Otherworld dimension, the Black Knight and Captain Britain go to save Camelot from the attacks of the Nethergod Necromon. In the process, Merlyn reforges the Ebony Sword and King Arthur is resurrected. In the final assault, Whitman and King Arthur succeed in killing Necromon, but Camelot is destroyed. During these events, Black Knight and Captain Britain are briefly kidnapped by the Grandmaster to participate in the original Contest of Champions.

Whitman eventually returns to the 20th century and his original body is restored. He is accompanied by a gift from Amergin: a black winged horse called Valinor, named after the fictional location of that name.

=== The blood curse ===
Once in modern times again, Whitman learns that the Ebony Blade is cursed: every time it draws blood, it drives its user closer to madness. Whitman frees Sir Percy's spirit from the Earthly plane, purging the blood curse from the sword. Whitman resumes active duty with the Avengers, helping his teammates Wasp and Captain Marvel experiment with their powers, and battles against the fourth version of the Masters of Evil when they invade Avengers Mansion.

When Namor uses the sword to kill his wife Marrina Smallwood, who had become a monster, the blood curse is revived. The curse begins to transform Whitman's body into the same mystic metal as the blade. He is forced to don an exoskeleton when the curse's creeping paralysis begins to affect his mobility. He also shows signs of mental instability. Ultimately, the blood curse becomes so virulent that it will draw blood from anyone even touching the Black Knight. After the Avengers were disbanded, Whitman joined Thor to defend Asgard from an invasion of the Egyptian God Seth. After the battle, the curse converted the Black Knight to a statue of stone again. The statue is brought by the Avengers to the knight's castle in England, under the care of Lady Victoria Bentley, an old friend of Whitman. After Lady Victoria tries a spell on the statue, Sir Percy takes possession of Whitman's body to stop the blood curse. He takes a young Irish man called Sean Dolan as his squire. Together they go to Doctor Strange's house to ask for help in the battle against Morgan le Fay and Mordred, who intended to return to the physical world using Morgan's old castle in Ireland. Morgan le Fay summoned the demon Balor, but the heroes are rescued by Valkyrie (summoned by Victoria Bentley). After banishing the villains, Sir Percy's spirit merges with the Ebony Sword, canceling the curse and returning Whitman to his normal state. The Black Knight begins a relation with Victoria Bentley and keeps Sean Dolan as his squire.

=== Sersi and the Gatherers Saga ===
After rejoining the Avengers, Whitman is a major member of the team. In this time he develops a weapon that projects a sword-like sheath of energy as a replacement of his Ebony Blade. The Black Knight is involved in the Avengers' attack of the Kree Empire during the Operation Galactic Storm, forming part of the team that went to the capital world in Hala. At the end of the mission, tormented by the genocide inflicted by the Kree Supreme Intelligence on its own people, he and other Avengers follow Iron Man to kill the entity. The Black Knight is the one that struck the mortal blow on the Supreme Intelligence.

Captain America leaves the Avengers because of these events, and the Black Knight eventually becomes the de facto field leader of the Avengers. During this time, he becomes romantically involved with his teammate Sersi (of the Eternals), but is also attracted by Crystal, one of the Inhumans' royal family. The Avengers are attacked numerous times by alternate versions of themselves, called the Gatherers, led by the mysterious Proctor. The relationship between The Black knight and Sersi soon comes under strain, as Sersi proves increasingly unstable and more aggressive, so when the Avengers travel to the planet Polemachus and the tyrant Anskar killed an innocent girl, Sersi killed him immediately. Her fellow Eternals, led by Ikaris, pay a visit to the Avengers and tell them that Sersi was affected by the Mahd W'yry, an incurable disease. In an attempt to stabilize her, and because she asked, Ikaris mentally bonds Sersi and Whitman with a process called the "Gann Josin", but this does little to slow the disease – not in the least due to Whitman's resentment at having the bond imposed upon him, and that he had come to the conclusion that it was Crystal he loved. With the bond, the Black Knight acquired more strength, red eyes, and an intimate mental connection with Sersi.

Meanwhile, the Ebony Sword comes into the possession of Sean Dolan, "squire" of the Black Knight; he becomes angry by Whitman's abandonment of Lady Victoria and transforms himself into the Bloodwraith when he could not endure the sword's curse. In a three-man fight with the Black Knight and Deadpool, Bloodwraith accidentally kills Lady Victoria.

The mental health of Sersi becomes worse with time. When she is framed for the murder of two policemen, Sersi snaps completely, destroying the Avengers mansion and fleeing to the Brooklyn Bridge. She used the Gann Josin bond to call Whitman to aid her and they battle the Avengers together – until the sight of her attacking Crystal enables the Black Knight to break the Gann Josin's hold on him temporarily. Then it is revealed that it was Proctor who caused the Mahd W'yry disease in Sersi. Whitman also discovers that Proctor is an alternate universe counterpart of himself. Having been rejected by his own Sersi and twisted by the Gann Josin and his Ebony Blade's curse, Proctor now travels the multiverse with the aid of the Gatherers and a captured Watcher named Ute on a mission to kill the Sersi of every reality. Ultimately, in the battle of the Avengers against the Gatherers, Sersi kills Proctor with his own Ebony Blade, but is still afflicted by the madness Proctor instilled in her. A mortally injured Ute uses the last of his power to create a gateway into another universe where Sersi could be free of the madness and restore her mind. Whitman decides to leave with her, partly because he does not want to come between Crystal and her husband Quicksilver and partly because he feels responsible for what happened to Sersi.

=== Ultraforce and Exodus ===
The pair are transported to the Ultraverse (home of the Malibu Comics characters). They are separated and the Black Knight arrives at the Miami Beach of this universe. Here he meets the young heroes Prime and Prototype, members of a local superhero team called Ultraforce. Whitman impresses them and tells his story. He becomes a member of Ultraforce and begins the search for Sersi. After being tricked by the god Loki, Whitman meets Sersi again, but she was possessed by the seventh infinity gem, the Ego gem and attacked him. When he approached her, she recognized him and stopped. However, she was still being controlled by the Ego gem and captured him and Ultraforce for Loki. Black Knight and the rest of the team escaped. In a dispute between Loki and the Grandmaster for the possession of the Infinity Gems, the heroes of Ultraforce were put against his counterparts of Earth-616: the Avengers. The Black Knight was left as a wild card in the competition. Loki won but when the six original gems were reunited, the combined sentient power of the Gems was revealed as the entity Nemesis. The entity began to create a mixed reality when she combined elements of Ultraverse and Marvel. Both teams joined forces against Nemesis and The Black Knight struck a blow to Nemesis with a Nazi Ebony Sword that scattered the Infinity Gems. Because of this, the Ultraverse was affected by a reality-warping event called Black September, after which Dane Whitman become the leader of Ultraforce. As leader, Dane Whitman brought Ultraforce in line, adopting new methods, bringing new members, managing the team and having a romantic tension with fellow member Topaz

After various adventures with Ultraforce, the Black Knight and other heroes of Ultraverse fought against an Alien robot, Maxis. Immediately after defeating the robot, the armada of the Tulkan aliens attacked New York with his powerful elite. Whitman led the victory against the aliens. After the flight of the Tulkans, the robot Maxis becomes more benevolent, and created an interdimensional portal. Whitman returned to Earth-616 with other exiles through this portal.

He and Sersi briefly reunite to return to the Marvel Universe, but something goes wrong along the way. Instead of returning to the Marvel universe's present, they end up in the 12th century and Whitman once again finds his spirit in the body of Sir Eobar Garrington. His consciousness is buried under Garrington's, however, and Sersi is forced to pass Garrington's soul onto the next plane (with his permission) to restore Whitman's consciousness. Whitman finds himself embroiled in a conflict with the evil mutant Apocalypse alongside his ancestor's best friend Bennet du Paris, the mutant who would later become Exodus. Apocalypse tries to get du Paris to kill his friend, but du Paris refuses. Judging him weak, Apocalypse puts du Paris in a state of suspended animation. Out of respect for his ancestor's friendship with du Paris, Whitman organizes an order of knights to guard du Paris' body, which they do through the ages until he is found and revived by Magneto. Sersi creates another portal, this time to the correct time period, and she and Whitman depart the 12th century.

=== Heroes for Hire ===
Whitman and Sersi are somehow separated in transit, which rips their Gann Josin bond apart. Whitman finds himself back in New York in the proper time, but without Sersi. He is soon dealt another shattering blow when he learns that the Avengers and most of the other major heroes have apparently perished in their battle with Onslaught while he was gone, including Crystal. Whitman then learns that the Lady of the Lake has selected him as the Pendragon for his age. She bestows upon him new mystical equipment from Avalon: a suit of armor, the enchanted flying horse Strider, the Shield of Night, which absorbs energy, and the Sword of Light, which returns that energy in the form of an energy projectile.

The newly empowered Black Knight helps the Heroes for Hire defeat Nitro, then accepts Iron Fist's offer to join the newly formed team (due primarily to his concern over former teammate and friend Hercules, who has been drinking heavily out of grief for the Avengers' deaths). Whitman eventually learns what happened to Sersi when she reappears asking for help to defeat yet another of her old enemy Ghaur's nefarious schemes with the help of the Eternals. After the team-up, Sersi and Whitman decided to be separated. Later, the Heroes for Hire find themselves in the midst of a major conflict in the High Evolutionary's city of Wundagore. During this time, Whitman fought again with Quicksilver for the affection of the inhuman Crystal, but she rejected both of them. The Black Knight leaves Heroes for Hire to assist the Knights of Wundagore along with Quicksilver and later returns to the Avengers when they expand their roster to include satellite teams around the world. Whitman is sent to the Slorenian border, where the Bloodwraith has used the Ebony Blade to absorb the souls of the entire population after they have been killed by the android Ultron. After the "Kang War" arc, the Avengers disband these global teams.

=== New Excalibur ===
Whitman reappears in New Excalibur in the mid-2000s. He has opened up a museum in England chronicling the Black Knights that have existed throughout history. Whitman learns that Sir Percy was not the original Black Knight, but that eight men had held the Ebony Blade prior to him. The Ebony Blade, however, corrupted these men, and Sir Percy was deemed the only one who was noble enough to wield the Blade. Also at this time, Merlin told Whitman that he must not destroy the Blade as he had previously been told to do. It is not clear whether he has access to his Avalonian equipment at present. In New Excalibur, Whitman is invited to join the team, but after the second adventure with them he refuses, as he believes that his Ebony Blade is not the real one and he needs to find the original.

=== MI-13 ===
Whitman returns to join MI-13 as part of the Secret Invasion crossover event. He is armed by what he believes was the Ebony Blade, which strongly encourages him to kill, but is later revealed to be a fake created by Dracula; this fake possesses an intelligence and feeds on blood. Whitman also is revealed to have a literal stone heart, given to him by Sersi to keep him "above it all" and uninvolved.

Whitman battles the Skrull forces in London, showing a new informal and wisecracking personality (a deliberate defence against the "Ebony Blade's" suggestions), and quickly bonds with medic Faiza Hussain, with whom he appears to have romantic tensions. Following the Skrull war, he makes her his squire.

After discovering that he did not have the real Ebony Blade, he goes to Wakanda and is given the real Blade back. He still retains the fake, vampiric sword. After recovering the sword, Whitman helps the team in the fight with the vampires that wanted to invade Britain. At the end, he begins a relationship with Faiza Hussain.

=== Original Sin ===
During the events of the Original Sin storyline, historian Rebecca Stevens learns that Whitman had violently attacked and nearly killed a new version of Savage Steel due to the influence of the Ebony Blade. Rebecca pleads with him to turn over the sword to S.H.I.E.L.D. or the Avengers, reasoning that its bloodlust is driving him mad, but Whitman refuses. Despite his assurance that he is fine, his home is seen covered in slash marks, with Whitman himself curled up on the floor in a mentally unhinged state. He is also seen threatening to kill Rebecca with the Blade, but she remains unaware of the danger.

Around this same time, Whitman returns to action as the leader of Euroforce, a team of European superheroes. Though he claims to not be bitter about being excluded from Captain America's new team of Avengers, it is implied that Whitman's deteriorating mental state had been the reason that he was passed over for membership.

=== Journey to Weirdworld ===
As part of the All-New, All-Different Marvel event, the Black Knight arrives on Weirdworld after killing Carnivore while losing control to the Ebony Blade, which causes him to flee from the scene of Carnivore's death. Upon arriving on Weirdworld, he kills King Zaltin Tar to establish New Avalon and builds an army with the help of two warriors named Shield and Spear. Black Knight has the army built in anticipation of the arrival of the Avengers Unity Division, who are seeking to bring him to justice. After struggling to maintain his sanity, Whitman is forced to battle the Uncanny Avengers, led by the aged Steve Rogers, who wish to arrest him for killing a criminal when he was still part of the Avengers team. It is revealed that Whitman accidentally entered Weirdworld, along with a Hydra submarine, from 1945. The members of Hydra on board the submarine became the group known as the Fangs of the Serpent to the inhabitants of Weirdworld. As the Uncanny Avengers arrive to arrest Whitman, he unites the armies of the land to fight against them. Eventually, he is defeated and a truce is made: Rogers will take the Ebony Blade back to Earth and Whitman will be free to rule New Avalon. However, Rogers is possessed by the Blade and attacks his teammates. Meanwhile, the son of the king that Whitman overthrew to become the new lord gathers the Fangs of the Serpent to attack Whitman. After their defeat, Rogers and Doctor Voodoo agree that the only person who can bear the toll of the Ebony Blade is Whitman, and the Blade also shows this by not allowing any harm to come to Whitman. As the Avengers leave, leaving behind an expert on the Black Knight who came with them to look after Whitman, it is concluded that Whitman had been maintaining his sanity better than everyone had thought. Whitman concludes that for now ruling New Avalon is good, and the story ends on a light tone, Whitman not being persecuted as he has suffered enough under the Blade's spell.

=== Return to heroic activity ===
During "Secret Empire", Black Knight returns to Europe to help Euroforce fight Hydra groups following their conquest of the United States. The group is imprisoned by Hydra until they were freed by the Champions of Europe.

In "The War of the Realms" event, the Black Knight, Union Jack, and Spitfire are defeated by Malekith the Accursed. Before he can kill them, he is attacked by Captain Marvel and the War Avengers. Later, he helped Punisher and his kill crew when they were attacking the Dark elves and some trolls.

During the "Empyre" storyline, Black Knight tells Captain America that he has been focusing on becoming a hero again after fighting the Giants and Dark Elves. He joins other Avengers in the fight against the Cotati in the Savage Land.

Later in "Savage Avengers", Dane is contacted by the more ruthless iteration of Earth's mightiest after singlehandedly tearing down a KKK operation. He was specifically nominated by Cain Marko because they needed the help of his Ebony Blade to kill the dragon Sadurang, a leftover from Malekith's War of the Realms.

=== Advent of Knull and revelations ===
Sometime after the Avengers reasserted their presence in the world, the Phoenix Force would descend after the attempted takeover by Moon Knight and his patron deity Khonshu. Dane would be amongst a host of other recipients selected by the enigmatic cosmic entity to participate in a tournament to decide its next host.

With the onset of the "King in Black", Black Knight has his hands full dealing with personal issues stemming from his loss of respect as a hero coupled with psychological issues begotten from bearing the accursed Ebony Blade. When the dark god Knull descended upon the Earth seeking to subsume it, he used his collective mind hive to invade the psyche space of the fallen hero in an attempt to claim his fabled blade from the stars. Revealing the swords true nature as an evil blade which amplifies the negative qualities in callow individuals already prone to hatred, violence and negative aspects not the other way around.

The revelation shakes Whitman to his core, as he is forced to realize the sword was never corrupting him and that Merlin lied about only the most pure-hearted beings' eligibility to use it. That all those times he went ballistic were of his own volition, the blade merely exacerbating these qualities to strengthen itself, as that was its true function.

With some convincing from the young heroine Aero, Whitman is able to come to grips with such insights and learn to own his faults in order to help save all of Shanghai from an enclave of Symbiote Dragons taking the form of Swordmaster's own personal boogie man. Learning to use his inner darkness in such a way to unlock new powers within his signature weapon that he had never learned to use before. After helping out the Avengers in resolving a mysticism based problem at Central Park, Whitman is killed by a mysterious assailant using the Obsidian Dagger; the opposing weapon of the Ebony Blade. Whitman's body is brought back to England, where he is unexpectedly resurrected by a blood offering to the enchanted steel by Jackie Chopra; an Arthurian history buff he had brought on as a liaison to better understand his familial history.

Whitman has a panic attack while the two are having lunch due to the trauma of dying and resurrecting. After sending his ersatz therapist away for a bit, he decides to contact his predecessor Sir Percy to inquire about how what happened happened. It was revealed that there are many hidden powers which the Ebony Blade possesses that Whitman's ancestor had not told him about. One such case being that those of Arthur's noble bloodline can draw upon the power of self-revival should they perish in battle. But before the spirit could reveal how he died despite this aspect of the weapon, Whitman's home is broken into by the monster hunter Elsa Bloodstone; another "Avengers Adjacent" who had been following a string of murders related to Whitman and his ebony relic. The conflict is quickly broken up by Jackie who returns after finding the mutilated remains of her history teacher. Jackie explains she has been having visions of the past ever since she touched Whitman's Ebony Blade, and they all come to realize that the relics created from the same starstone that begot the fabled skein in the first place were not destroyed upon their initial creation.

== Powers and abilities ==
Dane Whitman is an excellent swordsman, whose skills have allowed him to defeat Swordsman in combat. He is also an excellent fighter, being able to hold his own against such skilled fighters as Captain America and Wolverine. He is an expert horseman as well.

Whitman is a scientist, having earned a master's degree in physics, while being proficient in a wide array of advanced sciences and technologies, including genetic and mechanical engineering. Whitman maintains a scientific approach and perspective more often than not, despite his ties to the world of magic. He has also demonstrated good leadership skills as leader of both the Avengers and Ultraforce. He has strong strategic and tactical skills.

== Weapons and equipment ==
=== Mystical armaments ===
==== Ebony Blade ====
Dane Whitman eventually gained the Ebony Blade, a weapon that had been passed down through the ages from one of his ancestors to another. Although it was incredibly powerful, it carried a harmful curse that caused Whitman to eventually abandon it. As of New Excalibur #10, Whitman gained possession of a faux Ebony Blade.

==== Excalibur ====
For a time, Dane Whitman also wielded Excalibur in his battles against the evil dark wizard Necromon in Hulk (UK) #42-63, but later relinquished it to a reborn King Arthur.

=== Scientific paraphernalia ===
Dane Whitman first became the Black Knight to atone for the crimes that his uncle Nathan Garrett had committed using the name. He started out with his uncle's non-magical tools: a javelin that fired energy blasts, a suit of body armor, and a genetically-engineered winged white horse named Aragorn.

==== Power lance ====
The power lance is an invention of his late uncle Garrett's. Whitman would make use of the former Black Knight's signature weapon, designed through his expertise in mechanical automation, as an alternative to using the Ebony Blade for a while. Taking the appearance of a typical jousting shaft, the power lance is studded with numerous modern armaments and gadgetry.

==== Neural sword ====
After giving up the Ebony Blade, Whitman designed and constructed a neural sword. The neural sword appears to be made of a laser beam and cuts through non-living matter. Its "laser" blade is a neural disruptor when used against living beings; when Whitman cuts someone with the sword, it delivers a massive jolt to the being's central nervous system. This jolt is usually enough to incapacitate someone within just a few hits. Alternately, Whitman can reverse the neural sword's energy stream so that it encases its hilt and, by extension, Whitman's fist in a high-energy field. Using the sword in this fashion enables Whitman to punch with some unspecified degree of enhanced strength. The neural sword also creates a refraction field used to defend against energy-based attacks. The blade also included a lethal setting which Whitman reserved for rare circumstances.

==== Photon shield ====
For a brief period while in the service of MI:13, Whitman too adopted a hard-light energy shield similar to those used in the past by Captain America and the U.S.Agent.

=== Avalonian facilities ===
In the 1997 Heroes for Hire series, the Lady of the Lake named Whitman the Pendragon for the current era and gave him an amulet. When Whitman says the word "Avalon" while wearing the amulet, he gains the following:

Armor: The armor Whitman currently wears has been described as mystical. It is said to be supernaturally durable for its light weight, but specific information on the durability of the armor is scarce.

Strider: Strider is a mystical creature like Valinor rather than a genetically engineered one like Aragorn, but he is unique in that he possesses mystical powers of his own. Most notably, Strider is capable of far greater air speeds than either of Whitman's previous mounts; for example, he is easily capable of breaking the sound barrier. Whitman can verbally summon Strider to appear at his side or return to Avalon as he pleases. While mounted on Strider, Whitman is magically protected from any harsh environments, such as the depths of the ocean.

Shield of Night: The Shield of Night is a mystical kite shield; it not only protects him from most attacks but also absorbs the energy of the forces directed against it. He can then release that stored energy in the form of power blasts from his blade, the Sword of Light. Whitman has used it to block and absorb the energy of everything from Nitro's explosive blasts to fire to punches.

Sword of Light: The Sword of Light is a mystical sword capable of projecting the energy absorbed by the Shield of Night in blasts of the same kind of energy. It is also supernaturally durable and can cut through almost any substance.

While Whitman still has access to Strider and the mystical armor, he has not been seen using the Shield of Night or Sword of Light for some time.

=== Miscellaneous ===
Whitman has also employed an atomic steed, typically used by the High Evolutionary's Knights of Wundagore, in place of a winged horse at one time.

== Reception ==
Gregory Ellwood of Collider called Dane Whitman a "true Marvel legacy character" and described him as a hero "most fans are still hoping" to see on the big and small screen. IGN ranked Dane Whitman 22nd in their "Top 50 Avengers" list. Kevin Lee of Screen Rant named Dane Whitman one of the "10 Best Superheroes" created by Roy Thomas.

== Other versions ==
- A zombified alternate universe version of Dane Whitman from Earth-2149 makes a minor appearance in the Marvel Zombies tie-in one-shot Marvel Zombies: Dead Days.
- An alternate universe version of Dane Whitman from Earth-1610 appears in the Ultimate Marvel story Ultimate Comics: The Ultimates. This version is a member of the West Coast Ultimates who previously served as a corporal in the Marine Corps ten years prior before being rendered quadriplegic after saving fellow soldiers from an IED, for which he received the Purple Heart, the Silver Star Medal, and the Medal of Honor. Due to his instability as the Black Knight, Whitman is barred from joining the Ultimates until he stabilizes. In the present, corrupt California governor Ford recruits Whitman into the West Coast Ultimates to battle the Ultimates.
- An alternate universe version of Dane Whitman from Earth-374 appears in The Avengers #344 (February 1992). This version, also known as "Proctor", is the leader of a group called the "Gatherers" who can manipulate the minds of others and project energy beams from his eyes. Additionally, he seeks to kill versions of Sersi throughout the multiverse after his version rejected him. In pursuit of his goal, he travels to Earth-616, where he tries to win Magdalene's love and infiltrate the Avengers. However, he is impaled by the Ebony Blade while fighting them and forced to retreat.

== In other media ==
=== Television ===
Dane Whitman / Black Knight makes a non-speaking cameo appearance in The Avengers: Earth's Mightiest Heroes episode "Come the Conqueror".

=== Film ===
Dane Whitman appears in Eternals, portrayed by Kit Harington. This version is a history professor at London's Natural History Museum. In a post-credits scene, after Arishem captures Sersi, Dane obtains the Ebony Blade to find her as an unseen voice (identified off-screen as Blade) asks whether he is ready for it.

=== Video games ===
- Dane Whitman / Black Knight appears as a playable character in Avengers in Galactic Storm.
- Dane Whitman / Black Knight appears as a playable character in Marvel Avengers Alliance.
- Dane Whitman / Black Knight appears as a playable character in Marvel Avengers Academy, voiced by Ian Russell.
- Dane Whitman / Black Knight appears as a playable character in Lego Marvel's Avengers as part of the "Masters of Evil" DLC Pack.
- Dane Whitman / Black Knight appears as a playable character in Marvel Puzzle Quest.
- Dane Whitman / Black Knight appears as a playable card in Marvel Snap.

=== Merchandise ===
- In 2021, Funko released a Dane Whitman / Black Knight Funko Pop figure inspired by the MCU incarnation of the character.
- In 2023, Hasbro released a Dane Whitman / Black Knight action figure as part of the Marvel Legends action figure line.

== Collected editions ==
| Title | Material collected | Published date | ISBN |
|---|---|---|---|
| Avengers / X-Men: Bloodties | Black Knight: Exodus and Avengers #368-369, X-Men (vol.1) #26, Avengers West Coast (vol. 2) #101, Uncanny X-Men #307 | January 2000 | 978-0785161288 |
| Captain Britain Volume 2: Siege of Camelot | "Captain Britain'" strips from UK weekly Spider-Man & Captain Britain #246-53 and “Black Knight” and “Captain Britain” strips from UK weekly Hulk Comic #1 & #3-55 | October 2011 | 978-0785157533 |
| Black Knight: The Fall of Dane Whitman | Black Knight (vol. 3) #1-5, material from Original Sins #2 | June 2016 | 978-1302900311 |
| King in Black: Planet of the Symbiotes | King in Black: Black Knight #1 and King In Black: Planet of the Symbiotes #1-3 | July 2021 | 978-1302928100 |
| Black Knight: Curse of the Ebony Blade | Black Knight: Curse of the Ebony Blade #1-5 | November 2021 | 978-1302930219 |
| Death of Doctor Strange Companion | Death of Doctor Strange: X-Men/Black Knight #1 and Death of Doctor Strange: Bloodstone #1, Death of Doctor Strange: Avengers #1, Strange Academy Presents: The Death of Doctor Strange #1, Death of Doctor Strange: Spider-Man #1, Death of Doctor Strange: White Fox #1, Death of Doctor Strange: Blade #1 | March 2022 | 978-1302933104 |
