= Evil: In the Time of Heroes =

- Theatrical poster
- Directed by: Yorgos Noussias
- Written by: Claudio Bolivar; Petros Noussias; Yorgos Noussias
- Produced by: Louizos Aslanidis; Claudio Bolivar; Petros Nousias; Yorgas Noussias
- Starring: Meletis Georgiadis; Billy Zane; Andreas Kontopoulos; Pepi Moschovakou; Argiris Thanasoulas; Mary Tsoni
- Cinematography: Claudio Bolivar; Petros Noussias
- Edited by: Konstadinos Adraktas
- Music by: Grigoris Grigoropoulos
- Production companies: Audio Visual Enterprises; Boo Productions; Ekso Productions; Graal; Greek Film Center; Strada Productions
- Distributed by: Audio Visual Enterprises
- Release date: 1 October 2009
- Running time: 88 minutes
- Country: Greece
- Language: Greek

Evil: In the Time of Heroes (Greek: To Κακό 2: Στην Eποχή Tων Hρώων) is a 2009 Greek zombie horror film starring Billy Zane.

== Plot ==
The story plays three days later as the first movie, the ancient power transmuted the people in bloody-minded zombies, for over 9000 years the fight was ever between undead and humans, who won by the humans.

== Cast ==
- Billy Zane as Prophitis Messenger
- Andreas Kontopoulos as Vakirtzis
- Argyris Thanasoulas as Argyris
- Meletis Georgiadis as Meletis
- Pepi Moschovskou as Marina
- Mary Tsoni as Jenny
- Eftixia Giakoumi as Olga
- Ioanna Pappa as Vicky
- Apostolis Totsikas as Androkles
- Orfeas Avgoustidis as Alkiviades
- Drosos Skotis as Mageiras
- Thanos Tokakis as Johnny
- Christos Biros as Kyr-Kostas

== Release ==
The film premiered on 25 September 2009 as part of the Athens Film Festival and was released in the Greek cinemas on 1 October 2009. The film is part of the Fantasia Festival 2010 under the International title Evil – In the Time of Heroes.

== Background ==
The film is the follow-up as prequel to Evil
