= Mary Tsoni =

Greek actress and singer

- Born: 25 June 1987; Livadeia, Greece
- Died: 8 May 2017 (aged 29); Exarcheia, Athens, Greece
- Occupations: Actress, singer
- Years active: 2005–2010

Mary Tsoni (Greek: Μαίρη Τσώνη; 25 June 1987 – 8 May 2017) was a Greek actress and singer. She was born in Livadeia, and was best known for her roles in the films Evil (2005), Dogtooth and Evil: In the Time of Heroes (both 2009). For her role in Dogtooth, she won the award for Best Actress at the Sarajevo Film Festival. Tsoni was also the lead singer of a punk band called Mary and the Boy and, prior to her acting career, a make-up artist.

Tsoni was found dead in her apartment in Exarcheia, Athens, on 8 May 2017, aged 29. Her death was caused by pulmonary edema.

== Filmography ==
Year	Title	Role	Notes
2005	Evil	Jenny	
2005	Die Nordend Strasse	Mary	
2009	Dogtooth	Younger Daughter	
2009	Evil: In the Time of Heroes	Jenny	
2010	Artherapy		
2010	Ta oporofora tis Athinas		
2018	Motherland	Mary	
