= Black Knight (Sir Percy) =

Marvel Comics character

Sir Percy Black Knight
- Black Knight #1 (May 1955). Cover art by Joe Maneely.

Publication information
- Publisher: Marvel Comics
- First appearance: Black Knight #1 (May 1955)
- Created by: Stan Lee; Joe Maneely

In-story information
- Alter ego: Sir Percy of Scandia
- Team affiliations: Knights of the Round Table
- Abilities: Master swordsman, horseman and hand to hand combatant Talented poet, singer and musician Invulnerability; Wears impenetrable body armor and helmet Wields enchanted Ebony Blade

Sir Percy of Scandia, also known as the original Black Knight, is a fictional character appearing in American comic books published by Marvel Comics. He was a medieval knight created by writer-editor Stan Lee and artist Joe Maneely.

== Publication history ==
Marvel Comics' first Black Knight, Sir Percy of Scandia, first appeared in the medieval-adventure series Black Knight #1–5 (May–Dec. 1955) from Atlas Comics, the 1950s precursor to Marvel Comics. The five-issue series was written by Stan Lee, with art by Joe Maneely in the first three interiors and all five covers. Fred Kida and the team of penciller Syd Shores and inker Christopher Rule drew stories in the latter two issues.

Sir Percy appeared in Mystic Arcana, representing the element of earth.

== Fictional character biography ==
The original Black Knight is Sir Percy of Scandia, a 6th-century knight who serves at the court of King Arthur Pendragon as his greatest warrior and one of the Knights of the Round Table. Recruited by the wizard Merlin, Percy adopts a double identity, and pretends to be totally incompetent until changing into the persona of the Black Knight. As the Black Knight, Percy wields the Ebony Blade, which Merlin forged from a meteorite. A constant foe of the evil knight Mordred the Evil (Arthur's traitorous "nephew") and Morgan le Fay, in time Sir Percy retired his dual identity and married Lady Rosamund.

Percy is eventually killed at Castle Scandia by Mordred during the fall of Camelot when stabbed from behind with an enchanted blade made of the same material as his own Ebony Blade – although Mordred then dies himself of wounds inflicted by Arthur during the Battle of Camlann earlier that day. Merlin ensures that Percy's spirit will live on by casting a spell that will revive his ghost if Mordred should ever return.

Sir Percy was survived by a son, Geoffrey. Lady Rosamund later gave birth to his second son, Edward the Posthumous, who reportedly became ancestor of "a proud lineage". Several of Sir Percy's descendants adopted the Black Knight identity: Sir Raston, active during the late 6th and early 7th century, who eventually became an agent of the time traveler Kang the Conqueror; and Sir Eobar Garrington, a 12th-century knight serving under Richard the Lionheart during the Third Crusade.

Percy's spirit has appeared several times to counsel his descendant, Dane Whitman. He first appeared as a spirit to act as a mentor to Dane, revealing the circumstances of his death, and appeared a number of times subsequently as a spirit, summoned to give advice. Percy was eventually released from the mortal plane by Doctor Strange.

Percy's spirit again appeared to Dane Whitman, revealing how he wed Lady Rosamund. His spirit then took possession of Dane's body. With Doctor Strange, he fought Morgan le Fay and Balor, and was rescued by Valkyrie. He then made Sean Dolan his squire. Percy's spirit then took possession of the Ebony Blade itself.

== Powers and abilities ==
The Black Knight was a man with an athletic build with no superhuman powers. Percy was a master at swordsmanship, horseback riding and every combat form known in Britain in the age of Camelot. Percy was a skilled poet, singer, and lute player.

Percy wielded the Ebony Blade, and Merlin's spells rendered the Black Knight invulnerable to physical harm as long as long as he was holding the Ebony Blade. These spells had no effect against a weapon made of the same metal that the Ebony Blade was made from. He also wore body armor and a helmet which were similarly rendered impenetrable by Merlin's spells.

== In other media ==
- Sir Percy appears in the Spider-Man and His Amazing Friends episode "Knights & Demons", voiced by Vic Perrin.
- Sir Percy appears in Lego Marvel Super Heroes 2.

== Collected editions ==
Title	Material collected	Published date	ISBN
Atlas Era Black Knight/Yellow Claw Masterworks	Black Knight (vol. 1) #1-5 and Yellow Claw #1-4	September 2009	978-0785135159
