= Mount Evil =

Mountain in Tennessee, United States

Coordinates: 35.3045°N 84.8668°W

Mount Evil is a summit in Bradley County, Tennessee, in the United States. With an elevation of 1,017 feet (310 m), Mount Evil is the 1,321st highest summit in the state of Tennessee.
