= Evel Knievel (disambiguation) =

Evel Knievel (1938–2007) was a motorcycle stunt jump performer.

Evel Knievel may also refer to:

- Evel Knievel (1971 film), a film starring George Hamilton
- Evel Knievel (2004 film), a television film directed by John Badham
- Evel Knievel (video game), a video game published by Rockstar Games
- American Thunder (roller coaster), formerly called "Evel Knievel" from 2008 to 2010, a wooden roller coaster at Six Flags St. Louis

== See also ==
- Robbie Knievel, the son of Evel Knievel, who performed similar stunts
