= Evil (2005 film) =

- Official DVD Cover
- Directed by: Yorgos Noussias
- Written by: Yorgos Noussias
- Produced by: Claudio Bolivar; Petros Noussias; Yorgos Noussias; Lambros Trifillis
- Starring: Meletis Georgiadis; Yannis Katsambas; Andreas Kontopoulos; Themis Katz; Pepi Moschovakou; Argiris Thanasoulas; Stavroula Thomopoulou; Mary Tsoni
- Cinematography: Claudio Bolivar; Petros Noussias
- Edited by: Yorgos Noussias
- Music by: Grigoris Grigoropoulos; Thanos Karabatziakis
- Distributed by: Ekso Productions
- Release dates: 24 September 2005 (Athens International Film and Video Festival); 16 March 2006 (Greece)
- Running time: 92 minutes
- Country: Greece
- Language: Greek

Evil, also known as Το Κακό in Greek, is 2005 Greek zombie horror film. The film is notable for being the first Greek zombie film.

== Plot ==
Three construction workers discover an abandoned cave and are promptly attacked by a creature not shown on screen. Afterwards, the population of the city of Athens is turned into zombies, while the last remaining group of people attempt to survive.

== Cast ==
- Meletis Georgiadis as Meletis
- Argiris Thanasoulas as Argyris
- Pepi Moschovakou as Marina
- Stavroula Thomopoulou as Dimitra
- Mary Tsoni as Jenny
- Andreas Kontopoulos as Lieutenant Vakirtzis
- Nikos Sambalis as Andreas
- Yannis Katsambas as Giannis
- Daphne Larouni as Dafni
