= Mordred (comics) =

Publication information
- Publisher: Marvel Comics
- First appearance: Black Knight #1 (May 1955)
- Created by: Stan Lee and Joe Maneely

In-story information
- Alter ego: Sir Mordred
- Species: Human Mutant
- Team affiliations: Camelot; Knights of X
- Notable aliases: Modred; Mordred the Evil; Mordred of the Northern Isles; Black Druid

Mordred the Evil or Modred the Evil is a fictional character appearing in American comic books published by Marvel Comics. He is based loosely on the Mordred of Arthurian legend.

== Publication history ==
He first appeared in Black Knight #1 (May 1955).

== Fictional character biography ==
Mordred is the traitorous, illegitimate son of King Arthur Pendragon of Camelot and his sister Morgause, born somewhere in the Orkney Isles of Great Britain. He was one of the Knights of Camelot in Britain of the 6th Century, A.D. Merlin warned Arthur that Mordred would be responsible for the end of Camelot, but before Arthur could put the baby to death, he was rescued and raised in anonymity. Mordred was an insurrectionist, and his many conspiracies against his father were foiled by his constant foe Sir Percy of Scandia (the original Black Knight) and others until finally Mordred's forces defeated Arthur's on Salisbury Plain. Arthur and Mordred fatally wounded each other, and before dying, Mordred mortally wounded the Black Knight as well. Mordred was taken to Castle Scandia, where he died.

In modern times, Mordred's spirit has been allowed by the evil Celtic "Nether Gods" he serves to become active on Earth. His first opponent was fittingly the new Black Knight, Dane Whitman. He transformed former knife-thrower Paul Richarde into Le Sabre and sent him against the modern Black Knight, but was defeated. Mordred took human form in 12th Century Europe, where he formed an alliance with Prince John Lackland against King Richard I of England. Mordred was opposed by the reincarnated Black Knight. Mordred encountered the Defenders, and was defeated by the time-traveling Prester John. Mordred again was commanded by the Nethergods Mandrac and Necromon to prevent the arrival of Black Knight and Captain Britain to Otherworld. Mordred was defeated by Merlyn when the heroes finally arrived in Otherworld. Angry with Mordred's failure, Necromon sent him to his deepest dungeon.

Mordred's spirit was drawn into the netherworld by Morgan le Fay, and they became lovers. He plotted with her to change the Earth into a realm of black magic. With Morgan, he sent the Dreadknight against the Black Knight, Doctor Strange, and Victoria Bentley. With Morgan le Fay, he sent Balor of the Fomor against the Black Knight, Doctor Strange, and Valkyrie (Victoria Bentley). With Morgan le Fay, he sent the Fomor and "Wicker Man" against the Black Knight, Doctor Strange, and Valkyrie. Mordred was defeated and returned to the netherworld by the Black Knight. Mordred later assisted Morgan in a scheme involving the Twilight Sword, which reunited the Avengers.

After menacing the Black Knights, Mordred remained dead for some time. During this time, his father King Arthur became a pawn of Merlyn, and a sworn enemy of mutants, which he and his allies called "Witchbreed" or "Friends of Mordred". Through this Excalibur were able to figure out that Mordred was a mutant.

Once King Arthur confirmed this and that Mordred was prophesied to overthrow him, they returned to Krakoa and convinced the Five to resurrect him, using a vial of Otherworldly water in place of the standard genetic material. The Otherworldly magic involved made for an atypical resurrection, as Mordred immediately disappeared from the egg and found himself in Otherworld, returned to a young age and unaware of how he got there. Arthur's forces quickly engaged him in combat, but he proved a worthy foe. He eventually found his way to Captain Britain and her companions, he presented himself and asked for asylum. At that moment, Roma Regina gave all those present a magical vision, declaring them the Knights of X, and giving them a quest to find the lost Siege Perilous.

His first mission with the team was to Blightspoke, a poisoned land where the remnants of collapsed realities are buried, and while there he fought the Vescora and the team found its only resident Sheriff Gia Whitechapel and her crew imprisoned in a factory the makes solid Brightswill, a mutant depowering substance. After the factory was destroyed by Rictor and Shatterstar with Gia's help, the team headed toward Savalith, an ancient civilization founded by vampire-like beings. After regrouping to save Mad Jim Jaspers in the Crooked Market, Gambit sacrificed himself against King Arthur's forces gaining the team access to Mercator, an Otherworld domain created by Mister M out of the Siege Perilous. There they sank into the quicksand and were psychologically tested by the land, until Rachel Summers was able to break them out of the illusion. Afterwards Arthur's forces, Merlyn's forces and Roma and Saturnyne riding Shogo Lee's dragon form all converged to their location.

== Powers and abilities ==
Mordred was an athletic man, and was an expert swordsman and horseman and proficient jouster; skills he had developed at Arthur's court. He typically wore battle armor, and carried a sword, dagger, and lance, as well as a dagger carved from the same meteor fragment as the Black Knight's Ebony Blade.

The ability to assume an astral form was conferred upon his spirit after his death, by the Celtic "nether gods". In this form, he is able to confer certain powers and abilities upon living beings who serve him. He is also able to take on human form in time periods outside his own lifetime.

== Reception ==
- In 2022, CBR.com ranked Mordred the Evil 6th in their "Black Knight's 10 Strongest Villains" list.

== In other media ==
Mordred appears in the Spider-Man and His Amazing Friends episode "Knights and Demons".
