= King Arthur in comics =

King Arthur knighting Batman and Superman as seen in World's Finest Comics vol. 1 #162, art by Curt Swan.

King Arthur (Arthur Pendragon) is a legendary figure used commonly in comic books based on the legendary king of the same name.

== DC Comics ==
=== New Comics ===
King Arthur was first used in New Comics #3 ("The Tale of Sir Gareth of Orkney") and appears alongside his wife Guinevere, his friend Merlin, Sir Lancelot, and Gareth.

=== Batman ===
King Arthur is present in Batman #36, a possible fantasy entitled "Sir Batman at King Arthur's Court" in which Professor Carter Nichols uses his "Time-Ray Machine" device to send Batman and Robin back in time using "time travel hypnosis" to Arthur's court at Camelot.

=== Shining Knight ===
King Arthur reappears in Adventure Comics #66, a tale in which Merlin gives the Shining Knight a magical suit of armor (which protects its wearer from all forms of harm), a sword (capable of cutting any substance except the aforementioned suit), and a winged horse named Winged Victory. The Shining Knight later delivers the Holy Grail to King Arthur at Camelot.

=== Marvel Family ===
In Marvel Family #70, Merlin sends armor to the future, where it is worn by Sterling Morris, a descendant of King Arthur, and sends him back to Camelot. The Marvel Family follow him back in time and find while Arthur is away on a crusade, Queen Guinevere, who was left to rule the Kingdom, has been captured by the Black Wizard, who seeks to seize the Kingdom. Merlin has brought Morris back to rule the Kingdom while Arthur is away. The Marvels rescue Guinevere and retrieve Arthur from the Crusades. Arthur's Knights defeat the Black Wizard's forces and he is captured by Sterling.

=== Silent Knight ===
Arthur reappears in Brave and the Bold #1, a story where Merlin acts as a guide to young squire Brian Kent, who later becomes the Silent Knight.

=== World's Finest Comics ===
In World's Finest Comics #42, comic figures Doc and Fatty travel back to King Arthur's court using a unique device called a "Time-Typer", which is basically a souped-up typewriter. Doc and Fatty meet the King and are told that they need to kill a dragon to earn a seat at the Round Table. They later pilot a robot dragon and attempt to scam Arthur.

Green Arrow and Speedy travel to the jungle planet of Tropicus in World's Finest #52; there Green Arrow meets both Arthur and Daniel Boone in a story titled "A Sword, a Rifle and a Bow". Green Arrow, Arthur, and Boone are forced to duel in an alien arena against numerous Tropican warriors. At the end of the story, both heroes are returned to Earth as the capital city of Tropicus is destroyed by a volcanic eruption.

Arthur also appears in World's Finest #162, a story in which both Superman and Batman are dragged through time to Camelot through the use of a "Time Mist", by a race of purple shapeshifting aliens, who trick Batman and Superman into helping them overthrow Camelot. The disguised aliens state that Arthur, Merlin and the Knights of the Round Table are alien impostors who have driven them away from Camelot. With their help, Arthur and the Knights are defeated; during the fight, Superman is stunned by Arthur wielding Excalibur and Batman is wounded by Sir Galahad's magic spear. Batman and Superman later aid in their rescue when the deception is revealed and with the help of the magically empowered knights' powers such as Sir Bors' ring of fire, Sir Bohart's super-speed, Sir Kay's cloak of invisibility and growing powers, Sir Lancelot's invulnerable armor, Gawain's belt that gives him superhuman strength, and Merlin's magic spells, the aliens are ousted from Camelot. At the story's end, Superman and Batman are both knighted by Arthur.

=== Etrigan ===
Arthur makes a tangential appearance in The Demon #1, a story where Merlin enlisted the demon Etrigan in the defense of Camelot, against the coming of Morgaine le Fey, her army of demons, and Arthur's son Mordred. Later, in The Demon (vol. 3) #16-20, Merlin set Percival to guard the Region Beyond, where Merlin banished all the dangerous mystical entities native to Great Britain.

=== Other versions ===
==== Camelot 3000 ====
An alternate version of Arthur appears in the 1982 maxiseries Camelot 3000, where characters from Arthurian myth have no contact with DC superheroes in present day. He sleeps beneath Glastonbury Tor, but is awakened in the year 3000 to stave off an alien invasion spearheaded by his sister Morgan le Fay.

==== Batman: Dark Knight of the Round Table ====
An alternate Arthur also appears in the 1992 miniseries Batman: Dark Knight of the Round Table.

=== King Arthur (DC Comics) in other media ===
- King Arthur appears in The Adventures of Superboy episode "The Black Knight".
- King Arthur appears in Legends of Tomorrow episode "Camelot/3000", portrayed by Nils Hognestad. He is brainwashed into being evil by a similarly brainwashed Rip Hunter working for the Legion of Doom.
- Francis Magee portrays the character in the DC Extended Universe film Justice League. King Arthur appears in a flashback where he helps fend off an Apokoliptian invasion of Earth.

== Marvel Comics ==
King Arthur has appeared in Marvel Comics' comic books various times. Examples include the Black Knight and Captain Britain comic book series. The first version of Arthur Pendragon was in Black Knight #1 (May 1955) by Stan Lee and Joe Maneely. Captain Britain got his superpowers from the Arthurian magician Merlyn and his daughter Roma, not attested in the original legends.

=== King Arthur (Marvel Comics) in other media ===
King Arthur appears as an unlockable playable character in Lego Marvel Super Heroes 2, voiced by Cian Berry.

== Other examples ==
- In 1937, a newspaper comic strip by Hal Foster called Prince Valiant was first published with the byline "In the Days of King Arthur". The strip has continued in various hands since Foster's death in 1982.
- DC Comics uses King Arthur's Camelot as a recurring piece of its fictional history, and there have been "several Arthurs", including a pagan general in Roman Britain and a medieval Christian mystic. The various Arthurs were served by various versions of the character the Shining Knight, while Etrigan the Demon, under the control of Merlin, defended Camelot during its final days.
- Sir Percy of Scandia, the original version of the Marvel Comics character the Black Knight, was also a member of Arthur's court.
- In Marvel Comics' New Excalibur comic book series, King Arthur and his court appear when the members of Excalibur travel back in time to aid the Black Knight during his years as a member of Arthur's court. During the mission, Pete Wisdom inadvertently causes Guinevere and Sir Lancelot to commit their affair behind Arthur's back.
- Several comic book titles have explored the "Once and Future King" aspect of the legend by bringing Arthur and his knights back from the dead at the time of Britain's greatest need. Arthur and company re-emerge to battle an alien menace in A.D. 3000 in Camelot 3000.
- The heroes of Knights of Pendragon likewise assembled in the spirit of Arthur's Round Table.
- Simon Bisley's Treasure of Britain starring the character Sláine features Arthurian characters and themes.
- King Arthur makes several appearances throughout De Rode Ridder (The Red Knight), a Flemish comic book series.
- The French comic book Arthur the Legend, by David Chauvel and Jérôme Lereculey, draws inspiration from early medieval Welsh legends such as the Mabinogion.
- In Hellboy, Hellboy is descended from King Arthur through his son Mordred, by a daughter who was hidden away.
- In 1984 Colleen Doran's A Distant Soil introduced Sir Galahad to her space opera series.
- Merlin, from Robin Wood and Enrique Alcatena
- In the Donald Duck comic The Once and Future Duck (originally published in 1996) by Don Rosa, Donald, his three nephews Huey, Dewey, and Louie, and inventor Gyro Gearloose use a time machine by which they end up in Celtic Britain, meeting King Arthur as a rather uncultured local warlord, and they accidentally create the basis for many tropes from Arthurian legend.
- In Highschool DxD, King Arthur was depicted as one of the earliest and most famous Holy Sword wielders alongside his Knights of the Round Table such as Lancelot and Gawain, having been the first to dual wield the legendary Excalibur and Caliburn which were passed down to the Church Exorcists and his descendants, respectively, with Excalibur being wielded by Xenovia, one of the heroines, and Caliburn by his direct descendant.
- Unholy Grail by Cullen Bunn and Aftershock Comics features a horror revisionist take on the Arthurian legend.
- Arthur Pendragon is a supporting character in the manga The Seven Deadly Sins and becomes the main antagonist of its sequel Four Knights of the Apocalypse.
- The Arthurian mythos are deconstructed in the fantasy-horror comic book Once and Future (2019–2022), where a monstrous Arthur is resurrected in modern times by British nationalists during the Brexit negotiations.

== See also ==
- Merlin in comics
