= Lego Marvel Super Heroes 2 =

2017 action-adventure video game

- Developer: Traveller's Tales
- Publishers: Warner Bros. Interactive Entertainment; Feral Interactive (macOS)
- Directors: Stephen Sharples; Arthur Parsons
- Producers: Jennifer Burbeck; David Geeson; Toby Jennings
- Designer: Arthur Parsons
- Programmer: Steve Harding
- Artist: Leon Warren
- Writers: Kurt Busiek; Stephen Sharples
- Composer: Ian Livingstone
- Platforms: Nintendo Switch; PlayStation 4; Windows; Xbox One; macOS
- Release: 14 November 2017 macOS; 2 August 2018
- Genre: Action-adventure
- Modes: Single-player, multiplayer

Lego Marvel Super Heroes 2 is a 2017 Lego-themed action-adventure video game developed by Traveller's Tales and published by Warner Bros. Interactive Entertainment for Nintendo Switch, PlayStation 4, Windows, and Xbox One, and published by Feral Interactive for macOS. It is the sequel to 2013's Lego Marvel Super Heroes and the third installment of the Lego Marvel franchise.

With the core gameplay following the same style of past Lego titles, the game features the ability to manipulate time and a four-player competitive Super Hero battle mode. Lego Marvel Super Heroes 2's storyline centers around superheroes from different eras and realities of the Marvel Universe as they fight against the time-travelling villain Kang the Conqueror in a battle across space and time.

== Gameplay ==
Lego Marvel Super Heroes 2 is an action-adventure game played from a third-person perspective. The game features similar gameplay to its predecessors and other Lego video games, alternating between various action-adventure sequences and puzzle-solving scenarios. The game also introduces a new four-player competitive Super Hero battle mode, allowing players to fight each other cooperatively in battle arenas.

=== Characters ===
Much like the two previous Lego Marvel games, the players are able to take control of a roster of iconic characters from the Marvel Universe, each with their own unique abilities. For example, Star-Lord is capable of flight, Black Panther can activate claw switches, and Spider-Man can swing on his webs, crawl on walls, and use his spider-sense to detect hidden objects. The game also features characters from different time periods and realities over the Marvel Universe, which includes Spider-Gwen, Spider-Man 2099, Spider-Man Noir, King Arthur, Merlin, a cowboy version of Captain America, a troll counterpart of Hulk, and many others. In addition, the game also features variations of sundry characters, like Iron Duck (Howard the Duck wearing Iron Man's armor) and Carnom (a fusion of the Venom symbiote and the Carnage symbiote that is exclusive to the game while loosely based on Toxin).

While some characters are based on the comic books, others have their visuals taken from the Marvel Cinematic Universe, such as the Guardians of the Galaxy, Doctor Strange, and Ant-Man. Players can change the look and abilities of certain characters. For instance, they can take Baby Groot and change him to his adult version, and Spider-Man can go change to his Noir and 2099 counterparts.

=== Setting ===
The ability to manipulate time is allowed to players directly from the new open world of Chronopolis, which is a myriad of 17 different Marvel locations (consisting of a variation of Ancient Egypt, an apocalyptic Asgard, Attilan, Hala, the Hydra Empire, K'un-Lun, Knowhere, Lemuria, Man-Thing's Swamp, Manhattan, an alternate version of Medieval England, a Marvel Noir version of New York City called Manhattan Noir, Nueva York, a variation of the Old West, Sakaar, Wakanda, and Xandar) linked through time and space and surrounding Kang the Conqueror's Citadel.

=== Downloadable content ===
On 6 October 2017, ten DLC packs were announced for the game. Of these ten, there are six level packs and four character packs based on Marvel Cinematic Universe films, superhero teams, and time variant heroes:

- On 19 December 2017, two character packs were released. Agents of Atlas features the playable characters Jimmy Woo, Gorilla-Man, The Uranian, M-11, and Venus. The Classic Guardians pack features Charlie-27, Major Astro, Martinex, Yondu, Starhawk, Aleta Ogord, and Nikki.
- On 19 December 2017, a Guardians of the Galaxy Vol. 2 level pack was released, featuring a level based on the opening scene of the film. It adds several new characters, including Kraglin, Stakar Ogord, Tullk Ul-Zyn, Ego, and Ravager variants of Star-Lord and Rocket Raccoon.
- On 18 January 2018, a Champions character pack was released, featuring Moon Girl, Devil Dinosaur, Viv Vision, Amadeus Cho, Nova, Wasp, and Hawkeye.
- On 18 February 2018, a Black Panther level pack was released. It features new characters from the film, such as Okoye, Nakia, Everett K. Ross, Ulysses Klaue, and Erik Killmonger. However, the level included had no connection to the film.
- On 20 March 2018, a Cloak and Dagger level pack was released, and introduced the playable characters Cloak and Dagger, Mister Negative, Blackout, Shroud, Nightmare, and Silvermane. The level included takes place immediately after Cloak and Dagger gain their powers and involves them escaping their evil captor.
- On 10 April 2018, a Runaways level pack was released, which includes characters such as Nico Minoru, Chase Stein, Alex Wilder, Karolina Dean, Molly Hayes, Gertrude Yorkes, and Old Lace. The level is based on a story from the comic series, wherein the team travels to Marine Vivarium and encounters the Pride.
- On 24 April 2018, a level pack inspired by Avengers: Infinity War was released, which includes an original level where the player controls the Black Order as they invade Attilan. The pack unlocks Hulkbuster 2.0 and an adolescent Groot, as well as Thanos and the Black Order (consisting of Corvus Glaive, Cull Obsidian, Proxima Midnight, Supergiant, and Ebony Maw).
- On 6 July 2018, a final level pack inspired by Ant-Man and the Wasp was released, which includes an original level featuring Ant-Man and the Wasp as they try to recover Hank Pym's original Ant-Man helmet from Egghead, who plans to use it to create A.I. Avengers. The DLC adds eight new characters to the game: Ant-Man, Wasp, Egghead, Crossfire, Ghost, Giant-Man (Raz Malhotra), Human Fly, and Stinger (Cassie Lang).

== Plot ==
The Guardians of the Galaxy help defend Xandar from an attack by Kang the Conqueror, who uses his time crystal to summon Eson the Searcher. After the Guardians defeat Eson, Kang's ship, the Damocles, launches devices which cause a section of Xandar to disappear.

Meanwhile, at Avengers Mansion, Nick Fury presents the Avengers with several missions: Captain America, She-Hulk, and Thor fight the Presence in Siberia; Iron Man and Captain Marvel defeat Attuma at his underwater base; and Spider-Man, Ms. Marvel, and White Tiger battle escaped Raft prisoners on the Brooklyn Bridge, including most of the Sinister Six. The Guardians of the Galaxy arrive just before Kang uses his devices to steal Manhattan with the heroes inside it and make it part of his battle arena called Chronopolis, consisting of various locales that he has stolen from across time and space with his citadel at the center.

Captain America leads a team through a portal to medieval England, where they help Sir Percy reclaim his castle from Enchantress and the Black Knight. Another team led by She-Hulk follows Klaw and the Hydra Four through a portal to Wakanda, where Black Panther joins them to fight Man-Ape in the vibranium mines. The heroes converge in a version of Manhattan ruled by Hydra, where they battle Klaw and vibranium robot soldiers created by Arnim Zola, and defeat Baron Zemo in a dogfight. Thor, Captain Marvel, and She-Hulk then travel to a swamp where they defeat Man-Thing. Kang reveals that Man-Thing was guarding the Nexus of All Realities, which separated the realms of Chronopolis. Kang destroys the Nexus, which drops the barriers between the locations, and challenges the heroes to rise up and face him.

Regrouping at Avengers Mansion, the heroes detect a faint signal from outside Chronopolis. Searching for a device to boost its strength, the Guardians travel to the Old West where they battle MODOK and the Circus of Crime. Retrieving the device, they learn that the signal is being sent from Knowhere by Cosmo the Spacedog. The heroes plan to retrieve the fragments of the Nexus to bring Knowhere into Chronopolis and use its energies to bring down the barrier surrounding Kang's citadel.

In preparation, Doctor Strange leads a team to the Sanctum Sanctorum where they fight Baron Mordo and retrieve the Book of the Vishanti, while Thor leads a party to an apocalyptic version of Asgard to enlist the aid of Heimdall, facing Loki and Surtur in the process. The search for the five Nexus fragments again splits the heroes into teams Spider-Man's group visits the Marvel Noir version of Manhattan, where they help Iron Fist, Daredevil, Luke Cage, and Spider-Man Noir defeat the Kingpin. Iron Fist accompanies them to K'un-Lun, where they fight Steel Serpent to free Shou-Lao and retrieve a Nexus fragment. Proceeding to the Alchemax building in Marvel 2099's Nueva York, Spider-Gwen and Spider-Man 2099 help the group defeat the Green Goblin 2099 and "Carnom" (a fusion of Venom and Carnage) to obtain another fragment.

Meanwhile, the Guardians defeat Ronan the Accuser, who has a Nexus fragment, in the Kree home world of Hala, but are brainwashed by the Supreme Intelligence. After stopping a coup by Maximus in Attilan, the Inhuman royal family rescue the Guardians, defeat the Supreme Intelligence and agree to join them in defeating Kang.

At the same time, Captain America's group travels to the underwater city of Lemuria, but falls into a trap set by Attuma and are forced into Sakaar where Red King pits them against the "World Breakers" (consisting of Hulk, Red Hulk, Maestro, and Greenskyn Smashtroll). Joined by the Hulk and Stingray, they return to Lemuria, defeat Attuma and Torg, and retrieve a Nexus fragment. Moving on to Ancient Egypt, they enter a Sphinx and join Horus of the Heliopolitans in facing Loki and N'Kantu, the Living Mummy to obtain another fragment. As Kang observes the heroes' exploits and plots to destroy them, his wife Ravonna becomes increasingly disturbed by his actions.

With the fragments gathered, the heroes assemble a device to bring Knowhere through a portal opened by Doctor Strange. Their first attempt nearly brings Ego the Living Planet instead because of Kang's interference. Once Knowhere is in Chronopolis, they use an electromagnetic pulse to knock out the energy shield protecting Kang's citadel. As the heroes begin their assault, Kang summons the Damocles. Iron Man, Spider-Man, and Star-Lord disable the ship, battling Korvac and escaping before it crashes. Captain America, Captain Marvel, Doctor Strange, and Star-Lord enter the citadel and face Kang, who grows to gigantic size, uses the time crystal to reverse the Damocles' destruction, and wields it as a sword. Captain America creates a giant solid hologram of himself and uses it to defeat Kang. Ravonna betrays Kang and uses the time crystal to turn him into a baby. The heroes celebrate their victory, and Ravonna promises to return the components of Chronopolis to their original places in time and space once the remaining villains are dealt with.

In a post-credits scene, everything is restored to normal. While visiting the Statue of Liberty, Iron Man, Captain America, and Captain Marvel are visited by Ravonna (now known as "Terminatrix"), an elderly Kang, the Supreme Intelligence, Cosmo, and Man-Thing, who ask for their help in fixing a "chronal fracture".

== Audio ==
Due to the 2016–2017 video game voice actor strike, the cast from the previous game as well from Lego Marvel's Avengers did not return to reprise their roles as they were affiliated with SAG-AFTRA. While in favor of a new voice cast, Greg Miller voices Howard the Duck, Peter Serafinowicz voices the game's antagonist Kang the Conqueror, and Sacha Dhawan reprised his role as Steel Serpent from the Iron Fist television series. Archive recordings of Stan Lee from the previous game were used to portray his character.

== Reception ==
Reception

Aggregate score
Aggregator	Score
Metacritic	(XONE) 76/100 (NS) 75/100 (PS4) 73/100

Review scores
Publication	Score
Computer Games Magazine	7.5/10
Game Informer	6/10
GameSpot	7/10
GamesRadar+	4/5
IGN	8/10
Nintendo Life	7/10
Polygon	6/10
Push Square	5/10
Shacknews	8/10
USgamer	3.5/5

Lego Marvel Super Heroes 2 received generally positive reviews upon its release. Some strengths cited by reviewers include its writing, impresive visuals, and its large roster of characters.

=== Accolades ===
Year	Award	Category	Result	Ref.
2017	Game Critics Awards	Best Family/Social Game	Nominated	
2017	Gamescom 2017	Best Family Game	Nominated	
2018	New York Game Awards 2018	Central Park Children's Zoo Award for Best Kids Game	Nominated	
2018	National Academy of Video Game Trade Reviewers Awards	Performance in a Comedy, Supporting (Dar Dash)	Nominated	
2018	Nickelodeon's 2018 Kids' Choice Awards	Favorite Video Game	Nominated	
2018	Develop Awards	Animation	Nominated	

== See also ==
- Lego Super Heroes
