= Merlin in comics =

Mythological character Merlin as he appears in comics

Merlin is a legendary character who has appeared multiple times throughout comic books, especially in DC Comics and Marvel Comics.

== DC Comics ==
Merlin, from Madame Xanadu (vol. 2) #2, art by Amy Reeder.

The first adaptation of Merlin first appeared in a King Arthur-based comic book story in the anthology comic book series entitled originally New Comics (later re-titled Adventure Comics) in issue #3 (Feb. 1936) by Rafael Astarita, kicking off a six-issue adaptation of "The Tale of Sir Gareth of Orkney". He was also one of the earliest appearing recurring characters in a DC Comics title, appearing only slightly after Doctor Occult and before Slam Bradley and Superman.

In a Superboy story, he appears as a scientist of King Arthur's time who looks like Mister Mxyzptlk, but also has the gift of Second Sight.

The first modern version of Merlin is linked to his appearance in The Demon #1 (Sept. 1972). In this series, Merlin summons the demon Etrigan to combat Morgaine le Fey, and appears in several more issues of the series. These events are shown from a different point of view in Madame Xanadu (vol. 2) #1 (Aug. 2008), a Vertigo Comics title. In The Demon (vol. 2) #1 (April 1987), Merlin is established as Etrigan's half-demon brother and subsequent uses of the character have followed this backstory.

Merlin's father Belial had him trained in the arts of sorcery so that he could use his powers to control his older brother Etrigan. As a result, Merlin traveled far and wide on the mortal plane, studying various schools of magic. Eventually he became learned enough to bind his brother, and was responsible for binding Etrigan to the druid Iason, who would later be known as Jason Blood. Merlin employed Etrigan in the defense of Camelot against his nemesis Morgaine le Fey, her army of demons, and her son Mordred. Before Morgaine's attack, Merlin subdued his other brother Scapegoat and the Thing-That-Cannot-Die, banishing them to the Region Beyond, and set Sir Percival to guard the Region Beyond and prevent its prisoners from escaping.

Etrigan was able to defeat Morgaine le Fey and her demon army, and Arthur killed Mordred. The Phantom Stranger made sure that the fall of Camelot could not be prevented by arranging Merlin's ensorcellment by his student Nimue Inwudu (Madame Xanadu). Merlin eventually escapes this fate and has appeared elsewhere in DC Comics, proving to be immortal.

In the pre-Crisis DC Comics universe, Merlin possessed a magical crystal ball which he allowed the Justice League of America to keep after they helped him to defeat a trio of evil sorcerers. This Merlin comes from the alternate world of Magic-Land, where scientific laws do not apply, but magic does. Soon afterward, Merlin's crystal ball was used to communicate across dimensions with the Justice Society of America of Earth-Two. Both teams of heroes coordinated their efforts to defeat a group of villains known as the "Crime Champions".

In the Vertigo Comics miniseries The Names of Magic, Timothy Hunter encounters a version of Merlin trapped in an enchanted sleep in a cave in Cornwall. Merlin explains that Tim is his creation, a spiritual successor to the title of the Merlin (a living conduit of magic). He created Tim with multiple contradictory origins to enhance his legend. Aspects of Merlin are trapped in a forest in France, under a hill in Wales, and on an island in an invisible house of glass. In the subsequent ongoing series Hunter: The Age of Magic, Merlin's spirit manifests through Tim's owl, Yoyo, and becomes the boy's teacher, until his body is killed by the Brotherhood of the Cold Flame and his spirit passes on.

As of the Trials of Shazam maxiseries, the aspect of Merlin still free in the world now exhibits a visible demonic aspect and goes by his Welsh name Myrddin. He has also revealed the existence of several half-demon children sired and tutored by him. These descendants refer to themselves collectively as the "Council of Merlin". His favored daughter Sabina, a Creole witch, failed in her bid for the power of Shazam, which would have made her his anchor to Earth, and was killed after being drawn into a portal in a battle with Freddy Freeman.

In The New 52, Merlin makes his debut in Demon Knights #1, again as the magician of King Arthur's court and is responsible for Etrigan and Jason Blood merging. Years later, he was killed by a daemonite-controlled disciple in the city of Alba Sarum. The Demon Knights bring Merlin's body to Avalon, resurrecting the magician, who then uses his mystical powers to help defeat the invading forces of Lucifer and the Questing Queen. In the present, Merlin is called Adam One and is the leader of Stormwatch. Merlin is later killed by aliens at the moment of creation, creating an alternate timeline where he never formed Stormwatch.

=== Other versions ===
- An alternate version of Merlin appears in Camelot 3000, where characters from Arthurian myth have no contact with DC superheroes in present day. This Merlin is an immortal who calls King Arthur from Glastonbury Tor in the year 3000 to battle Morgaine le Fay's invasion.
- In the Elseworlds story Batman: Dark Knight of the Round Table, Merlin counsels a Round Table consisting of analogs of the Justice League of America.
- An alternate timeline version of Merlin appears in Future State. This version is a conqueror who seeks to claim the world's magic. To this end, he separates Jason Blood from Etrigan and manipulates Blood into serving him.

=== Merlin (DC Comics) in other media ===
- Merlin appears in The Adventures of Superboy episode "The Black Knight".
- Merlin appears in The Freedom Force, voiced by Michael Bell. This version is a member of the titular team.
- Merlin appears in a flashback in the Justice League episode "A Knight of Shadows", voiced by W. Morgan Sheppard. This version bound Jason Blood and Etrigan as punishment for Blood betraying Camelot to his secret lover Morgaine le Fey.
- Merlin appears in Batman: The Brave and the Bold, voiced by David McCallum. This version was previously Etrigan's master and worked with him to seal Astaroth in the underworld.
- Merlin appears in Justice League Action, voiced by Dan Donohue in "Speed Demon" and by Patrick Seitz in "Hat Trick".
- Merlin appears in Legends of Tomorrow as a disguise used by a time-travelling Courtney Whitmore (portrayed by Sarah Grey).
- Merlin appears in Justice League Dark, voiced by JB Blanc.

== Marvel Comics ==
Merlin is the name of multiple fictional characters appearing in American comic books published by Marvel Comics.

=== Original Merlin ===
The first Merlin of the Marvel Universe is apparently the figure of Arthurian legend, hailing from 6th century A.D. Britain. He was born in Carmarthen, Wales. He was a powerful sorcerer who acted as teacher, advisor, and defender of King Arthur Pendragon of Camelot. Merlin warned King Arthur that his son, Mordred, would be responsible for the end of Camelot, but before Arthur could put the baby to death, he was rescued and raised in anonymity. Merlin was responsible for teaching magic to Morgan le Fay, though she turned against him and became one of King Arthur's greatest foes.

Knowing that Britain would need a champion to face the likes of Morgan and Mordred, he sought a boy to become the first Black Knight. He had this boy, Percy, trained in all known forms of combat, and when he grew up, Percy was presented with the Ebony Blade. When Percy died, Merlin cast a spell that ensured he would have successors in future centuries.

Merlyn appears in Excalibur, now calling himself the Great Hierophant as the ruler of the Holy Republic of Fae, part of the Foul Courts of Otherworld. He is later revealed to be an ally of Morgan le Fey and Clan Akkaba and shares their hatred of mutants.

=== Other characters named Merlin ===
Other beings have also claimed the name Merlin, besides the Merlin of Arthurian legend:

==== Impostor Merlin ====
This being was apparently 10,000 years old, and apparently was a savage that came to possess some portion of the same Bloodgem that Ulysses Bloodstone would later possess, which gave him immortality and eternal youth. The false Merlin was revived in modern times after his coffin was found. Merlin claims to be a mutant and had the ability to control the minds of others, create illusions, project force bolts, levitate objects, teleport himself, create force fields, and alter his own appearance.

==== Dire Wraith version ====
Another being posing as Merlin was sent by Immortus to fight the Avengers. This Merlin was a Dire Wraith with no connection to the real Merlin.

==== Merlyn ====
The being Merlyn also claims to be the real Merlin and appears to be a gestalt of the various other Merlins within the Marvel Comics multiverse.

==== Perter Hunter ====
Peter Hunter, the British costumed champion known as Albion, a member of the Knights of Pendragon, is alleged to be the current reincarnation of Merlin.

==== Marvel UK version ====
Merlin also appeared in the Marvel UK Doctor Who comic appearing first in "The Neutron Knights" story and later in the longer "The Tides of Time". This Merlin was one of the High Evolutionaries of the Cosmos, a group that also includes Rassilon, the founder of the Time Lords.

=== Merlin (Marvel Comics) in other media ===
- An alternate reality variant of Merlin appears in the Ultimate Spider-Man episode "The Spider-Verse", voiced by Tom Kenny.
- Merlin appears in the Marvel Future Avengers episode "Out of Time", voiced by Shozo Sasaki in the Japanese version and by Mick Wingert in the English dub.
- Merlin appears as an unlockable playable character in Lego Marvel Super Heroes 2.

== Other notable appearances ==
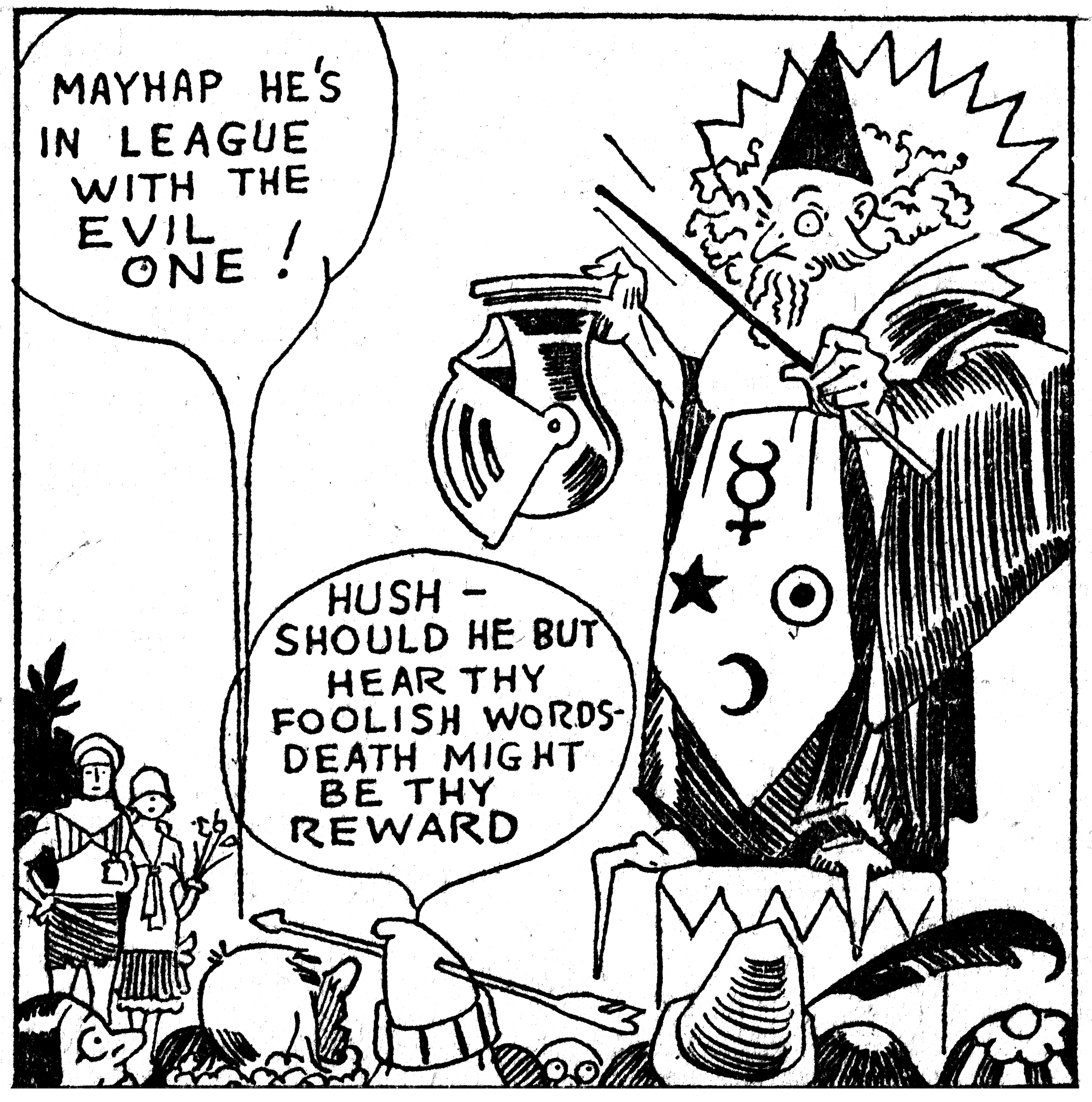
Panel featuring Merlin from Charles Forbell's 1929 comic strip Cuddles, an American Flapper at King Arthur's Court

- Merlin appears occasionally in Charles Forbell's 1929 time travel comic strip series Cuddles, an American Flapper at King Arthur's Court.
- Merlin is a major character in Matt Wagner's Mage series, which features a reincarnated King Arthur as the character Kevin Matchstick. He is presented as the World Mage and is a paraplegic in the first series Mage: The Hero Discovered. He is depicted as an old man named Wally Ut, who Kevin thinks of as a crackpot until he reveals himself in Mage: The Hero Defined.
- Merlin is the title-character in Merlin, a comic book by Robin Wood and Enrique Alcatena.
- Merlin is a member of the titular knights in The Seven Deadly Sins, representing the sin of Gluttony.

== See also ==
- King Arthur in comics
