= List of Squadron Supreme members =

This article lists the members of the Squadron Supreme.

== Early Squadron Supreme members ==
Squadron member	JLA counterpart
Hyperion	Superman
Nighthawk	Batman
Power Princess	Wonder Woman
Blur	Flash
Doctor Spectrum	Green Lantern
Amphibian	Aquaman
Skrullian Skymaster	Martian Manhunter
Golden Archer (originally named Hawkeye, later named Black Archer)	Green Arrow
Lady Lark (later named Skylark)	Black Canary (Skylark also analogous to Hawkwoman/Hawkgirl)
Tom Thumb	Atom
Blue Eagle (originally named American Eagle; also called Cap'n Hawk)	Hawkman
Arcanna/Moonglow	Zatanna
Nuke	Firestorm

== Institute of Evil members in the Squadron ==
The Institute of Evil was a group of the Squadron's arch-foes. They were brainwashed to not be evil and inducted into the Squadron.

- Ape-X – Xina is an intelligent ape who is a loose pastiche of Gorilla Grodd.
- Doctor Decibel – Anton Decibel is a criminal surgeon who was responsible for giving Lady Lark her superpowers.
- Foxfire – Olivia Underwood is a supervillain who can project bio-luminescent energy.
- Lamprey – Donald McGuiggin is a power-absorbing supervillain who is a pastiche of Parasite.
- Quagmire – Jerome Myers is an enemy of Doctor Spectrum who can generate Darkforce Tar.
- Shape – Raleigh Lund is a supervillain with elasticity who is loosely based on Plastic Man. He later defected to the Squadron Supreme.

== Nighthawk's Redeemers ==
Nighthawk then formed a group called the America Redeemers from unknown superhumans and former supervillains.

- Redstone - Michael Redstone is a superhero with super-strength.
- Moonglow - Melissa Hanover is an illusion-casting superhero.
- Inertia - Edith Freiberg is a superhero who can transfer kinetic energy into another object or person.
- Haywire - Harold Danforth is a superhero who can form "tanglewire" filament.
- Thermite - Sam Yurimoto is a superhero who can project heat from the left side of his body and intense cold from the right side of his body.
- Mink – Julie Steel is a cat burglar who is a pastiche of Catwoman.
- Remnant - Frank Edwards is a former villain of Nighthawk who can fly and animate cloth in order to ensnare anyone.
- Pinball - Chester Freeman is a former villain of Nighthawk who can inflate himself into a ball and bounce around when in a ball-like shape.

In addition, Nighthawk's group eventually included former Institute of Evil members Lamprey, Foxfire, and Shape, as well as expelled Squadron Supreme member Black Archer.

== All-New All-Different Marvel ==
In the post-Secret Wars world several superheroes from destroyed alternate universes form a new Squadron Supreme.

- Hyperion from Earth-13034
- Doctor Spectrum from Earth-4290001
- Nighthawk from Earth-31916
- Thundra from Earth-715
- Blur from Earth-148611
- Warrior Woman

== Squadron Supreme of America ==
The Squadron Supreme of America are simulacrums that were created by Mephisto and programmed by the Power Elite to serve as the United States of America's sanctioned superhero team. Among its members are:

- Doctor Spectrum (Joseph Ledger) - Leader. As a civilian, he works as a colonel in the United States Air Force.
- Hyperion (Marcus Milton) - Hyperion was programmed to be a mild-mannered man raised by farmers who had the strength of an Eternal. As a civilian, he works as a history teacher at Buscema High School in Kensington, Maryland.
- Power Princess (Zarda Shelton) - Power Princess was programmed to be a lustful power woman from Utopia Isle who wore a special necklace to dampen her powers when in her secret identity as a professional boxer.
- Nighthawk (Kyle Richmond) - An African-American variation of Kyle Richmond. Nighthawk was programmed to be in top physical condition while sporting some doubt and jealousy for his teammates enough for him to brood. As a civilian, he is a U.S. congressman elected to the House of Representatives to represent Washington DC.
- Blur (Stanley Stewart) - Blur was programmed to forcefully watch endless loops to keep up his brain speed while watching numerous S.H.I.E.L.D. files and unscrupulous videos. As a civilian, he works as a computer programmer at an office building in Washington DC.

== Other Squadron universe characters ==
A handful of other heroes and villains were seen in the Squadron series and elsewhere, most of whom were also directly analogous to specific DC characters.

- Bollix and the Rustler (Whizzer's foes, based on the Trickster and Terra-Man)
- Brain-Child (Avengers #85-86)
- Master Menace (based on Lex Luthor) - Menace has hair that will not stop growing
- Cerebrax (based on Brainiac) - Master Menace's android servant).
- Professor Imam (the Sorcerer Supreme of Earth-712, and with his past membership in "The Golden Agency", a stand-in for Doctor Fate.)
- Mysterium (based on Phantom Stranger the current form of the being who tried to swallow the Squadron's universe).
- Neal Richmond - Kyle Richmond adopted the biological son of the Huckster after the villain's death and raised him as his own. Neal eventually becomes the new Nighthawk.

New World Order also mentioned a number of other unseen characters with DC Universe analogues, such as the Erl King (a Swamp Thing analogue) and Nighthawk's archfoe Huckster (an obvious take on Joker).

There are also occasional references to a World War II superhero team called the Golden Agency, which included among its members Power Princess, the American Eagle, and Professor Imam.
