= List of Marvel Comics characters: T =

== T'Chanda ==
T'Chanda (also called Azzuri the Wise) is the father of T'Chaka and the grandfather of T'Challa. The character, created by Jack Kirby, Roy Thomas and Herb Trimpe, first appeared in Fantastic Four Unlimited #1 (January 1993). He operated as Black Panther during World War II. During World War II, T'Chanda encountered the young Steve Rogers and worked with Nick Fury and the Howling Commandos to repel the Red Skull and Baron Strucker.

=== T'Chanda in other media ===
- T'Chanda appears in the pilot episode of Black Panther, voiced by Taye Diggs.
- T'Chanda appears in the Avengers Assemble episode "The Lost Temple", voiced by Corey Jones.
- T'Chanda will appear in Marvel 1943: Rise of Hydra, voiced by Khary Payton.

== Taegukgi ==
- First appearance: Taskmaster (vol. 3) #3 (February 2021)
- Created by: Jed MacKay and Alessandro Vitti
- Teams: Tiger Division
- Abilities: Superhuman strength, durability, speed and stamina Flight; Nigh invulnerability Heat vision Longevity
- Aliases: Tae-Won
- Further reading: Taegukgi at Comic Vine; Taegukgi at League of Comic Geeks; Taegukgi at Marvel Database

Taegukgi (Tae-Won) is a character appearing in American comic books published by Marvel Comics. The character, created by Jed MacKay and Alessandro Vitti, first appeared in Taskmaster (vol. 3) #3 (February 2021).

Taegukgi is a South Korean superhero and field leader of the Tiger Division, the country's superhuman response team, and is regarded as its greatest national hero. Due to exposure from the mystical Psylot Gem, Taegukgi possesses superhuman strength, durability, speed and stamina, flight, and the ability to shoot energy beams from his eyes. Taegukgi's strength and powers are noted to be on par with Hyperion, Blue Marvel, and the Sentry. Taegukgi also possesses superhuman longevity, as he still retains the health, appearance, and vitality of a young man in his prime well into the 21st century despite being born during the Korean War. Taegukgi is fluent in both his native Korean and English. Despite his strength and invulnerability, Taegukgi is highly susceptible to psionic abilities, including mind control, body possession, and psychic attacks.

Orphaned as a baby in 1950 during the Korean War, Tae-Won was adopted by a similarly orphaned young woman whom he saw as his ajumma. Despite her best efforts, a young Tae-Won fell in with a group of thieves, which eventually became a criminal gang as they got older. In 1978, when the gang broke into a government facility to steal valuable materials, Tae-Won was exposed to energies created by the Psylot Gem, an Asgardian artifact left behind in Korea by Loki many years ago, which was being experimented on by the South Korean government. Instead of harming him, the Psylot Gem granted Tae-Won superhuman abilities. After his ajumma helped him control his powers and showed him the pain and misery inflicted upon civilians by the gang he created, Tae-Won vowed to use his powers to help people in need and to atone for his criminal past, eventually becoming the nation's greatest superhero, Taegukgi.

== Tagak the Leopard Lord ==
Tagak is a blind extra-dimensional humanoid who was summoned to Earth to catch a thief from his home dimension. Daredevil mistook Tagak for the thief, whom he was also trying to find, and subdued Tagak. After Tagak explained his mission to Daredevil, the two teamed up, allowing Tagak to capture the thief and return with him to his world.

Tagak is among the heroes who apply to become a member of the Defenders. Tagak accompanies the Defender-applicants on a single adventure before they disband.

== Tai ==
- First appearance: Thor #411 (December 1989)
- Created by: Tom DeFalco and Ron Frenz
- Teams: New Warriors
- Further reading: Tai at Comic Vine; Tai at Marvel Database

Tai is an elderly Cambodian mystic who was indirectly responsible for the formation of the New Warriors. She was born into a cult called the Dragon's Breath. Her people derive mystical energy from a well inside their temple that was a nexus into various alternate dimensions. The temple is constructed around the nexus point where vast amounts of mystic energy are constantly released. Throughout the centuries, Tai's people absorb the energy from the well. In a plan called 'the Pact', they devise a detailed program of interbreeding, the goal of which is to enable each successive generation to tap more energy from the well than its previous generation; eventually, one generation would use that power to rule the world. Tai's generation is actually able to harness the energies of the well, and is led to believe that they are the ones to rule the world. Tai refuses to share powers and slays everyone in the cult, except six maiden brides and a series of temple guards.

During the Vietnam War, a unit of American soldiers calling themselves the 'Half-Fulls' encounter the temple but are captured by Tai. Tai tells them the story of her people and that the six soldiers had to marry and procreate with the six maiden brides. All but one of them agree to do so (Daryl Taylor was already married). After their tour, the soldiers return home to America with their new brides, while Tai remains in Cambodia. Tai marries her only daughter, Miyami, to an African American soldier named Andrew Chord. Miyami soon gives birth to two children: Silhouette and Aaron (Midnight's Fire). To prevent her children from being used as Tai's pawns, Miyami fakes their deaths as well as her own, and leaves her children to be raised in Manhattan's Chinatown.

Chord, thinking his family is dead, becomes a mercenary and travels the world. Eventually, he arrives in Cambodia and renews his association with his mother-in-law. Together they return to America. Tai worries her son-in-law fears his place in the Pact is moot now that his son is dead. Tai urges Chord to resume his friendship with army buddy Daryl Taylor (the one who rejected the Pact). Chord does so and becomes godfather to Daryl and his six-year-old son Dwayne. Tai then demands Chord kill Daryl and his wife Melody; Chord does so, unwillingly, in front of Dwayne. Dwayne is then introduced to Tai and his memory is wiped. Chord and Tai raise Dwayne and train him to be a crime fighter. They also manage Daryl's charitable organization, the Taylor Foundation, often using it to finance questionable activities around the world. Dwayne becomes Night Thrasher and is briefly part of a team with Tai's grandchildren Midnight's Fire and Silhouette. At the time, the three are unaware of the relevant biological relationship. Later, Night Thrasher finds the New Warriors. Tai influences the group from behind the scenes. In New Warriors #8, she bets the safety and security of the Warriors on a conflict with Emma Frost. Frost commands her own team of super-powered teens to bring back one of the Warriors, who used to be her student; however, Frost's team is defeated.

Tai hopes to sacrifice the New Warriors to the well instead of the super-powered members of the Folding Circle (the children born from the mating of the soldiers and the brides). Tai and Chord's illegal business dealings are exposed, and Chord attempts suicide rather than admit the truth. While in the hospital, his wife Miyami visits him. Tai discovers this and is enraged that her daughter had faked her death and the deaths of her grandchildren. Tai murders her daughter in a fit of anger. Tai also uses her power to heal Chord of his brutal injuries, though she is unable to completely restore him.

Tai later returns to Cambodia. She is soon followed by the Folding Circle, now led by the Left Hand, a rogue-powered villain influenced by the energies of the well. The New Warriors also follow in an Avengers Quinjet. Tai attempts to sacrifice both groups to the well. They work together to try and save each other, but it all comes down to Dwayne, who uses an Uzi submachine gun to injure and seemingly kill Tai. Both she and the Left Hand are sucked down into the well.

== Talon ==
Talon is a character appearing in the American comic books published by Marvel Comics. He is a feline Inhuman and sorcerer apprentice to Krugarr, and a member of the Guardians of the Galaxy. Talon debuted in Guardians of the Galaxy #18 (November 1991).

According to creator Jim Valentino, he wanted to use Wolverine in a storyline where the Guardians had briefly returned to Earth, but Bob Harras, the X-Men editor of the time, did not want it established that Wolverine could live that long. Thus, Valentino created Talon, influenced by Steve Englehart's take on Beast during his time with the Avengers. Valentino later stated that Talon "wasn't gay, as some people thought. I thought it would lighten things up to have a happy-go-lucky screw-up on the team since, when looked at properly, the Guardians were not a superhero team, but rather a light army."

Talon has some superhuman abilities thanks to his genetically superior Inhuman physiology; he has also possibly been exposed to the mutagenic Terrigen Mist. He has cat-like abilities, including a prehensile tail and powerful claws that can be detached and hurled as weapons, then regrow instantly.

== Opal Tanaka ==
Opal Tanaka is a character appearing in American comic books published by Marvel Comics. She was created by Louise Simonson and Terry Shoemaker and first introduced in X-Factor #51 (February 1990). Opal is the former girlfriend of Iceman, a member of the X-Men.

Opal Tanaka lives in New York City and when X-Factor's ship takes up residence in the city, it blocks the sunlight that would strike her apartment, causing her plants to wilt. She encounters Iceman, who had come into the music store where she works, and expresses her views to him. Iceman, smitten with her, asks her out. Intrigued by him, she accepts.

== Tanaraq ==
Tanaraq is a member of the Great Beasts. He is responsible for the symbiosis that turned Walter Langkowski into Sasquatch during his gamma ray experiment. In flashbacks, it was revealed that Tanaraq was a member of the Avengers of 1000 A.D.

== Tangerine ==
Tangerine is a character appearing in American comic books published by Marvel Comics. Created by Alan Davis, she first appeared in Excalibur #66 (June 1993) in the "Days of Future Past" timeline. Her mainstream continuity version was created by Paul Cornell and Leonard Kirk and introduced in Captain Britain and MI13 #15 (September 2009).

She is a mutant with psychic and bio-electric abilities. Her mainstream continuity version is a member of MI-13.

== Tar Baby ==
Tar Baby is a member of the Morlocks who can secrete a tar-like substance from his body. He once tried to help Annalee capture Power Pack and force them to become her children. He helped another group of Morlocks in a second attempt, which was thwarted by the X-Men.

In the series Weapon X, Tar Baby is captured and executed by the Weapon X program.

=== Tar Baby in other media ===
Tar Baby makes a non-speaking cameo appearance in the X-Men: The Animated Series episode "Captive Hearts".

== Tara ==
Tara the Girlchild is a character appearing in American comic books published by Marvel Comics. Created by Mike Friedrich and Paul Gulacy, she first appeared in Adventures into Fear #20 (November 1973).

Tara is a genetically engineered psychic vampire with the ability to use an older avatar of herself with superhuman abilities. She is used as a weapon for Reverend Daemond and the Caretakers of Arcturus IV, and battles alongside Morbius, the Living Vampire, against her creators before dying from the confrontation.

Another character called Tara is a female Synthezoid based on the original Human Torch who first appeared in Avengers (vol. 3) #83.

She was made by the Red Skull as a secret weapon of the Invaders' enemies, the Axis Mundi. Later on, Tara's sleeper program activated and her self-destruct systems almost killed the New Invaders, but the Torch absorbed her excess heat and shut down the android. It is unknown whether or not Tara could be reactivated again.

== Tarn the Uncaring ==
Tarn the Uncaring is a mutant-Daemon hybrid from the dimension of Amenth with the power to manipulate genes and read minds. Born of Annihilation's forced breeding of captured Arakkii mutants and Amenthi Daemons, Tarn became a "genomic mage," using his powers to physically reshape other mutants and grant them new abilities, inspiring the fearful loyalty and worship of those that survived and forming the Locus Vile. Following Arakko's subjugation by Genesis, Tarn monitored the Arakkii populace, detecting rebellious thoughts and imprisoning and torturing those who refused to submit to Annihilation. He also claimed the Seat of Loss on the Great Ring of Arakko, defending it from challengers.

To secure influence over the Great Ring, Abigail Brand convinces Vulcan to challenge Tarn for his seat. Though they negate each other's powers, Tarn proved stronger and kills Vulcan. Immediately, Magneto challenged Tarn, while Sunspot secretly tricked Isca into wagering against him. Magneto forces his helmet onto Tarn, blocking his gene-altering abilities, then kills him, claiming Tarn's seat on the Great Ring.

== Tarot ==
Tarot (Marie-Ange Colbert) is a character appearing in American comic books published by Marvel Comics who first appeared in The New Mutants #16 (June 1984), created by Chris Claremont and Sal Buscema. Tarot is a member of the original Hellions.

Tarot is able to generate animated constructs composed of tangible psionic energy based on the two-dimensional figures on the tarot cards she carries. She can create multiple human-sized figures and even massive flying constructs without any apparent strain. Tarot's psionic constructs are superhumanly strong and durable, resistant to physical damage, temperature extremes, and certain forms of energy. She later developed the ability to apply certain characteristics on the images in her cards upon herself, such as Death's shroud and scythe, thereby increasing her effectiveness in battle. These constructs are completely under Tarot's mental control and will dissipate on her command or if she is rendered unconscious. It is unknown if she is completely reliant on tarot cards to fuel her generative power, or if she can create constructs from other imagery.

Tarot also apparently possesses some degree of precognitive ability, being able to accurately predict events in the near or distant future through reading of her cards.

== Tattoo ==
Tattoo is the name of several characters appearing in American comic books published by Marvel Comics.

=== Iron Man villain ===
Tattoo is an unnamed bandaged saboteur who assumed the alias of Dr. Bart Ansilee. He controlled people with special headphones which led to him running afoul of Iron Man. After thwarting his plot, Iron Man tries to interrogate Tattoo about who hired him, only for Tattoo to die from poison.

=== Tudo Sokuto ===
Tudo Sokuto is the brother of Genetix member Base and member of Tektos. He sports four arms and can manipulate the tattoos on them.

=== Christine Cord ===
Christine Cord, also known as Longstrike, is a character appearing in American comic books published by Marvel Comics. Created by Grant Morrison and Frank Quitely, she first appeared in New X-Men #126. She is a mutant and a student of the Xavier Institute who can display messages or designs on her skin, as well as phase through solid matter.

Tattoo joins the Omega Gang, led by Quentin Quire, which includes her brother Radian. They set out to avenge the death of Jumbo Carnation, a popular mutant clothes designer. The Omega Gang starts a riot at Xavier Institute during 'Opening Day' celebrations, an event designed to bring the public to Xavier's. Several members, including Tattoo, confront the X-Men on the front lawn. During the battle, Tattoo manages to phase her hand into Cyclops's head. She informs him if she became solid, he would die. Emma Frost turns into her diamond form and places her hand inside of Tattoo's head; now Tattoo would also die if she became solid. This eliminates the stand-off. After the Omega Gang is neutralized, all but Quire are sentenced to jail.

Tattoo is one of many mutants who lose their superhuman powers after M-Day. After being released from jail, she joins the New Warriors under the codename Longstrike, using a version of Stilt-Man's armor since she no longer has her abilities. However, she is killed on one of the team's first missions.

=== Tattoo in other media ===
- The Tudo Sokuto incarnation of Tattoo appears in Elektra, portrayed by Chris Ackerman. This version is a member of the Hand and has only two arms.
- The Tudo Sokuto incarnation of Tattoo appears in the video game adaption of Elektra.

== Orwell Taylor ==
Orwell Taylor is a general who founded the Jury following the death of his oldest son, Hugh. Although the Jury fails against Venom, Orwell devises a way to kidnap Spider-Man to be put on trial for bringing the Venom symbiote to Earth. However, the Jury and Orwell are again met with defeat.

Taylor starts a business relationship with the Life Foundation, with the Jury becoming glorified bodyguards for people in the organization's bunkers. Taylor soon becomes paranoid that his men seek to usurp his authority. In addition, Taylor's methods led him to clash most often with his younger son, Maxwell. He also routinely clashes with Ramshot, whose conscience interferes with Taylor's way of running the Jury. Maxwell abandons the Screech identity to serve as a defense attorney for the Jury's victims, with Wysper taking his place.

== Taxi Taylor ==
Jim "Taxi" Taylor is a character appearing in American comic books published by Marvel Comics who made his debut in Mystic Comics #2 (April 1940).

He drove a submersible flying machine called the 'Wonder Car' and stabbed enemy agents from "Swastikaland" as part of a day's work as a taxi driver. Taylor was created by an unknown creative team for Harry "A" Chesler Studios. The Taxi Taylor feature did not appear again, but he appeared in the Golden Age revival series All-Winners Squad: Band of Heroes, and with Howard the Duck and Spider-Man.

== Temugin ==
Temugin is a character appearing in American comic books published by Marvel Comics. Created by Ryan Odagawa and Mike Grell, he first appeared in Iron Man (vol. 3) #53 (June 2002). The character is named after Genghis Khan, his ancestor.

As an infant, Temugin was delivered to a monastery in the Himalayas by his father, the Mandarin. Confident the monks would educate the boy, the Mandarin cut off almost all communication with his son, which left Temugin with abandonment issues.

Temugin appears in the miniseries Iron Man: Enter the Mandarin, where the Mandarin uses his mind control ring to force Temugin to kill Tony Stark. He later shoots Stark in the chest, and deduces the man's secret when the suit's chest plate stops the bullet. Temugin escapes and returns to the monastery, and a disappointed Mandarin wipes his mind of the incident.

After the Mandarin's death in a battle against Iron Man, Temugin receives his father's 10 rings of power and discovers that, for honor's sake, he must kill Iron Man so his father's spirit can find peace. Luring Iron Man to his father's fortress, Temugin proves more than a match for Iron Man's mechanically enhanced strength. However, before he can kill Iron Man, another enemy of the Mandarin attacks and the fortress erupts into flames.

Temugin later appears in MODOK's 11 #4, wherein he has been contacted by the double-crossing Spot, who promptly hands over the weapon that MODOK had been planning to steal. In this appearance, Temugin speaks of the Mandarin as his "late father" and bears the rings, one of which he uses to imprison Spot in another dimension with nothing but money. In the following issue, the Puma tears off at least one of his hands. However, it is possible that he retained at least half of the rings, as Nightshade, who used the rings on his lost hand, was not seen with them at the end of the story.

However, much later Temugin is seen among the Agents of Atlas, appointed as a second in command, and possible replacement, for Jimmy Woo, current head figure for the Atlas Foundation. Now sporting a bulky prosthetic, Temugin initially comes into conflict with Jimmy Woo over what he perceives as Woo's cowardly behavior and pointlessly complicated planning. The two gradually become friends over the course of several battles, most notably versus Jade Claw.

Sasha Hammer is his paternal half-sister.

=== Temugin in other media ===
Temugin / Mandarin, also known as Gene Khan, appears in Iron Man: Armored Adventures, voiced by Vincent Tong.

== Terminus ==
Terminus is an extraterrestrial cyborg and a destroyer of worlds, first encountered by Mister Fantastic and She-Hulk while they investigated a powerful beam from outer space. The beam is Terminus, claiming Earth as his. Mister Fantastic defeats him with a device that drives him hundreds of miles into the crust of the planet.

=== Terminus in other media ===
Terminus appears in the Fantastic Four: World's Greatest Heroes episode "Scavenger Hunt", voiced by Lee Tockar.

== Terraformer ==
Terraformer is a simuloid created by Plantman that gained independence and became a member of Force of Nature.

== Terror ==
Terror is the name of two characters in Marvel Comics.

=== The Terror ===
The Terror debuted in Mystic Comics #5, a publication of Marvel Comics' predecessor, Timely Comics.

The man who became the Terror was injured in an automobile accident after his car crashed into a tree. Dr. John Storm, a reclusive scientist, found his body. Previously, the doctor had come under attack by a rogue gorilla; during the incident, a formula had spilled into the food belonging to the doctor's dog. The dog consumed some of the food and became a bloodthirsty wolf-like monster. The gorilla was swiftly defeated. Storm theorizes that the formula gives entities what they needed in times of extreme need, akin to hysterical strength. He decides to test the formula on the man he rescued, who becomes the hero called the Terror.

== TESS-One ==
TESS-One (Total Elimination of the Super Soldiers) is a robot developed by the United States following World War II as a countermeasure to the destructive potential of superheroes like Captain America and the Invaders. Through the course of one of Captain America's adventures in the early 1980s, he uncovers the TESS program and makes an uneasy alliance with Wolverine to defeat it. The robot is defeated when Captain America and Wolverine cut off its head.

TESS-One is a large, autonomous robot that can fire powerful energy blasts. TESS-One also uses machineguns, but quickly runs out of ammunition. During its first appearance, it storms a lab and upgrades its chassis with adamantium, making it much harder to defeat.

== Tess Black ==
Tess Black is a demigoddess; she is the daughter of a mortal woman and the Asgardian god of mischief, Loki. She was once possessed by the ancient Sorceress of Chaos, Morwen, but Loki and Spider-Man help her escape from the possession.

== Tetherblood ==
Tetherblood is a character appearing in American comic books published by Marvel Comics. The character, created by Fabian Nicieza and Art Thibert, first appeared in Cable #1 (March 1993).

Tetherblood is the co-founder of Clan Chosen alongside Cable (Nathan Summers), his protege.

=== Tetherblood in other media ===
Tetherblood makes a non-speaking appearance in the X-Men '97 episode "Tolerance is Extinction".

== Thane ==
- First appearance: New Avengers (vol. 3) #10 (November 2013)
- Created by: Jonathan Hickman, Mike Deodato Jr.
- Species: Titanian-Inhuman hybrid
- Abilities: Death Touch; Amber Encasement
- Aliases: Healer, Phoenix
- Further reading: Thane at the Comic Book DB (archived from the original)

Thane is a character appearing in American comic books published by Marvel Comics. Created by Jonathan Hickman and Mike Deodato and first appearing in New Avengers (vol. 3) #10, he is the illegitimate child of Thanos and an unnamed Inhuman woman.

In 2021, CBR.com ranked Thane 4th in their "15 Most Powerful Eternals" list.

In Infinity, Thanos invades Attilan in an attempt to find and kill his son. After undergoing Terrigenesis, Thane's Inhuman abilities activate and he develops the ability to instantly kill others or encase them in amber. However, he is unable to control his powers and inadvertently kills everyone in his hometown before Ebony Maw gives him a special suit that allows him to properly control and channel his powers.

Thane is easily manipulated, having been used by villains such as J'son and Death in pursuit of their own goals. He is briefly empowered by both The Black Vortex and the Phoenix Force, but is later stripped of all his powers and trapped by Thanos in the God Quarry.

=== Thane in other media ===
- Thane appears in Marvel Avengers Academy.
- Thane appears in Marvel Ultimate Alliance 3: The Black Order, voiced by Robbie Daymond.

== Thang ==
Thang is a character appearing in American comic books published by Marvel Comics. He is an anthropomorphic dog version of the Thing.

== Theia ==
Theia is a character appearing in American comic books published by Marvel Comics. She was created by Steve Orlando and Eleonora Carlini, and first appeared in Marauders (vol. 2) #4 (July 2022). Theia is a mutant with the ability to travel forward in time by increasing gravity around herself.

Theia belongs to the Threshold Three, a group of mutants from the Threshold sent forward in time to seek help in the Threshold's war against the Unbreathing. The three are vaporized by the Kin Crimson, but their DNA is preserved. Two billion years later, the Marauders acquire the Threshold Three's DNA and has them resurrected.

== Thena ==
Thena is the name of two characters in Marvel Comics.

=== Asgardian ===
Thena is a member of the Asgardian race in Marvel Comics 2, a possible alternate future of the main storyline published by Marvel Comics. She first appeared in Avengers Next #2 (November 2006). She is the daughter of Thor, the Avenger and god of thunder.

In her first comic book appearance, Thena is attacked in error by heroes Nova and Earth Sentry as soon as she lands on Earth. In a fit of rage, she battles the A-Next team to a standstill until she is stunned by a power-blast from Katherine Power.

Thena joins the team on their mission to rescue Kevin Masterson, not realizing that it is a trap created by Sylene, the daughter of Loki, as a way to use their powers to transform Earth into a newer version of Asgard. Although Thena and J2 are used as sacrifices for the spell, they manage to free themselves. Thena (under her father's orders) restores Kevin's powers, allowing him to become Thunderstrike.

As an Asgardian, Thena benefits from superior strength, durability, and an extended lifespan when compared with normal humans. Additionally, she has similar powers to her father's, enabling her to control lightning.

== Thermite ==
Thermite is the name of two characters in Marvel Comics.

=== Earth-712 Thermite ===
Thermite was recruited by Nighthawk into his Redeemers to oppose his former group, the Squadron Supreme. Along with four other members of the Redeemers (Redstone, Moonglow, Inertia, and Haywire), Thermite infiltrated the Squadron and served for about a month before the Redeemers openly opposed the Squadron. He was killed when his regulator pack was damaged in a collision with the Whizzer.

=== Earth-616 Thermite ===
The origin of this Thermite before joining the New Enforcers has not been revealed.

When Blood Rose tracks the New Enforcers to their headquarters, Thermite assists his teammates in attacking Black Rose where he disarms Blood Rose. Spider-Man arrives in his new armor and defeats the New Enforcers members, until Thermite is the only one left standing. Thermite manages to destroy Spider-Man's armor, but Spider-Man knocks him out with one punch. Thermite and the other members of the New Enforcers are arrested by the police.

== Think Tank ==
Think Tank is the name of two characters in Marvel Comics.

=== Think Tank (Freedom Force) ===
The second Think Tank is a member of the Fifty State Initiative's Freedom Force. He is a telekinetic superhero who has a liquid-filled globe for a head that contains his brain.

== Dai Thomas ==
Dai Thomas is a British police detective, who is commonly associated with Excalibur. Thomas had a strained relationship with the superhero community after the death of his wife during a battle between Thor and Hulk. He initially held a grudge against Captain Britain, before reconciling. He later attended a party at Braddock Manor, which was attacked by Sat-Yr-9 and Jamie Braddock, and was captured and tortured along with the other guests before being freed.

== Thor ==
Thor is the name of several characters in Marvel Comics.

== Thorn ==
Thorn (Salvatore "Sal" Carbone) is a character appearing in American comic books published by Marvel Comics, primarily as an enemy of the Punisher, created by writer Chuck Dixon and artist John Romita Jr. He first appeared in The Punisher War Zone #1 (March 1992).

Wanting to eliminate the Carbones, a crime family situated in Brooklyn, the Punisher infiltrates the group with the aid of a petty criminal named Mickey Fondozzi. The Carbones are led by Julius, whose second in-command is his brother Salvatore (Sal). While Julius welcomes Mickey and the Punisher (who had adopted the alias "Johnny Tower") into the organization, Sal dislikes the two, and is suspicious of their motives, correctly assuming that they are sabotaging the Carbones' operations.

Needing leverage to get Sal off of their backs, Mickey and the Punisher spy on him, and discover that he is consorting with rival Asian gangsters. Enraged by Sal's treachery, Julius orders Mickey and the Punisher to dispose of him, so the two drug Sal and drive him out to New Jersey. Due to his frequent narcotics usage, Sal is able to resist the drugs he was given and tries to flee, but falls through the ice on a frozen lake. Believing Sal to be dead, Mickey and the Punisher leave.

Sal survives, and regains consciousness in a hospital, which he escapes from. Recalling nothing about his past other than vague details about the people who tried to kill him, Sal robs and murders a man, and begins making his way to La Isla de Tiburones Durmientes, where Julius' daughter is about to marry a Sicilian mobster. When a motorist he flags down asked for his name, Sal, unable to remember, replies by saying "Thorn", a word he glimpsed on a billboard.

After swimming to La Isla de Tiburones Durmientes, Thorn runs amok, killing his niece's fiancé and Julius, among others. The Punisher stops Thorn's rampage by shooting him repeatedly and knocking him into the ocean. Thorn recovers, and later murders a trio of drug dealers for their car, which he drives to New York. Thorn finds and attacks Mickey and the Punisher, but the fight is interrupted by the boss of the dealers Thorn killed. After massacring the head dealer and his underlings, Thorn and the Punisher continue their brawl, which ends when the Punisher throws Thorn off of a bridge and onto a moving truck. The truck brings Thorn to New Jersey, and he is last seen wandering Newark.

For unexplained reasons, nearly dying in a frigid lake left Thorn unable to feel pain, allowing him to sustain severe injuries (such as multiple gunshots) without being deterred. Thorn's brush with death also eliminated his need for basic human necessities such as food, water, air, and protection from the elements, and made him repellent towards animals such as sharks.

=== Reception of Thorn ===
In a 2009 interview with Comic Book Resources, illustrator Dale Eaglesham expressed fondness for the character, stating "I spent some time in the Punisher department from 93 to 95 and I really enjoyed working with Frank Castle. However, there's another Punisher-related character that I feel I have unfinished business with: Sal Carbone, the man they call Thorn. He went toe-to-toe with Castle and survived because he thinks he's already dead. He's insane, and he would actually make a great Punisher! Maybe I can talk Ed Brubaker into that one; I think he would love it."

Thorn ranked #4 on The Robot's Voice list "The 8 Worst Punisher Villains Ever".

== Thornn ==
Thornn is the name of two characters appearing in American comic books published by Marvel Comics.

=== Morlock ===
Thornn (Lucia Callasantos) is a character appearing in American comic books published by Marvel Comics. Created by Rob Liefeld and Fabian Nicieza, she first appeared in X-Force #6 (January 1992) as a member of the Morlocks. Thornn is a mutant with a feline appearance and a prehensile tail, as well as enhanced senses, strength, agility, and healing abilities.

When the Morlocks consider forming an alliance with the Brotherhood of Evil Mutants, Thornn helps convince them to do so. They attempt to capture her sister, the X-Force member Feral, but fail.

Later, she helps X-Force capture her sister when it is revealed that Feral killed several of their family members.

She later joins X-Corporation and helps save Charles Xavier's life.

Thornn is depowered after M-Day, but is later shown apparently repowered, though it is implied that only her feline appearance was returned to her and not her enhanced abilities.

She later joins the mutant nation of Krakoa.

=== In other media ===
The Morlock Thornn appears in Wolverine versus Sabretooth, voiced by Heather Doerksen.

== Thori ==
- First appearance: Journey into Mystery #632 (February 2012)
- Created by: Kieron Gillen, Doug Braithwaite
- Species: Hellhound
- Abilities: Pyrokinesis; Interdimensional Tracking; Speech; Intersellar Flight; Enhanced Speed
- Aliases: Deathripper
- Further reading: Thori at the Comic Book DB (archived from the original)

Thori is a character appearing in American comic books published by Marvel Comics. He was created by Kieron Gillen and Doug Braithwaite and first appeared in Journey into Mystery #632 (February 2012).

When Garm and Hel-Wolf are left together by Kid Loki, they conceive seven Hel pups, one of which is Thori. While his siblings inherited their mother's loyal nature, Thori inherited his father's vicious nature. Garm gives the pups to Loki as a gift, since she did not have time to raise them. However, the All-Mothers (Freyja, Gaea, and Idunn) order Loki to find another home for the pups, so Loki and Leah leave six of the pups with Mephisto, Gaea, Warlock, Heimdall, Tyr, and an Earth animal shelter. Only Thori remains, but Loki is unable to find a home for the pup. Although the All-Mothers order him to destroy the pup, since he is beyond salvation, Loki decides to keep him as his pet and names him 'Thori' after his brother, Thor.

When Daimon Hellstrom joins Loki to battle Nightmare, Thori immediately grows fond of Daimon and asks him to be his new master. After the Disir attack, Thori helps Thor, Loki, and the Warriors Three go to Sigurd and the New Mutants. When Loki is trapped in Muspelheim, Thor tries to lead Hel-Wolf away from Loki, but Thori betrays them and directs his father to Loki. After the events of the Everything Burns storyline, where the Aesir battle the Vanir, Thori remains with his father.

When Angela comes to Hel to get the soul of her love, Sera, and take control of Hel, Thori aids Hela, Hel-Wolf, and the Disir in the battle; however, Sera traps him. After Angela is successful in the battle, she resurrects Sera and, along with Leah (an alternate version of Hela), brings Thori to Brooklyn. After defeating the Faustian Queen, an alternate version of Angela, Leah takes Thori and leaves New York.

At some point, Thori is captured by the Collector as part of his museum. When Odinson tries to retrieve Ultimate Thor's hammer Mjölnir, he comes across Thori, who manages to escape with Odinson and stays at his side afterwards.

== Thousand ==
Carl King is a character appearing in American comic books published by Marvel Comics. He debuted in Spider-Man's Tangled Web #1 (June 2001), and was created by Garth Ennis and John McCrea. He is a bully to Peter Parker (Spider-Man) who turns into a hive of spiders called the Thousand.

Jealous of Parker, King eats a radioactive spider which causes his body to break down into a hive mind of spiders, which consumes various people and takes control of the victims' remains to get stronger. King decides to attack Spider-Man to gain his abilities, but is defeated by Spider-Man. During the fight, he accidentally makes contact with an energy box that kills many of his spiders; only one survives, which then gets stepped on by an unaware citizen.

== Thumbelina ==
Thumbelina (Kristina Anderson) is a character appearing in American comic books published by Marvel Comics. She made her first appearance in The New Mutants #86 (December, 1989), and was created by Louise Simonson and Rob Liefeld. She is a mutant with the power to shrink her body while also increasing her strength. Thumbelina is a longtime member of the Mutant Liberation Front.

Her brother is the mutant Slab of the Nasty Boys, and she has joined the nation of Krakoa and S.W.O.R.D.

== Thunderbird ==
Thunderbird is the name of several characters appearing in American comic books published by Marvel Comics.

== Thundersword ==
Thundersword (Stewart Cadwall) is a character appearing in American comic books published by Marvel Comics. Created by Jim Shooter and Al Milgrom, he first appeared in Secret Wars II #1 (July 1985).

== Tiboro ==
Tiboro is a character appearing in American comic books published by Marvel Comics.

Tiboro is a humanoid being from the so-called "Sixth Dimension" who ruled a tribe of Earth humans in South America ages ago, but was eventually banished. He now waits for Earth's civilization to fall into decadence and decay so that he can rule the whole planet. Most of Tiboro's power is contained in his wand, but he can also exercise formidable magical abilities without such artificial aids. Tiboro uses an artifact called the Screaming Idol to communicate with creatures on Earth while he is in his own dimension.

In modern times, Tiboro has become a minor nemesis of Doctor Strange. During the Death of Doctor Strange storyline, Tiboro has claimed his ancient territory in Peru. Clea later mentions to Classic Doctor Strange and those present that Tiboro and the other inter-dimensional warlords are fleeing from the Three Mothers.

== Tick-Tock ==
Tick-Tock is a character appearing in American comic books published by Marvel Comics, created by Ann Nocenti and Brian Postman. He is a mutant, and first appeared in Spider-Woman #50 (February 1983).

Tick-Tock is introduced as he helps Locksmith capture and imprison various San Francisco-based superheroes and supervillains, including Spider-Woman. He uses his precognitive abilities to help prevent breakouts, anticipating the prisoners' attempts before they can happen. However, he does not foresee that when Spider-Woman breaks out, she changes costumes with Gypsy Moth. Placing the two women in each other's cells, Spider-Woman is then able to escape and free the others, and Locksmith and Tick-Tock are sent to prison.

Tick-Tock later joins the Shroud's group Night Shift and assists in their assault upon the Power Broker alongside Captain America (pretending to be hypnotized by Dansen Macabre). Tick-Tock enables the group to get past the guards at the gate by predicting their movements. Tick-Tock helps Captain America and the Shroud guard the prisoners they take inside the Power Broker's mansion, and ultimately escapes with the Night Shift, evading the authorities.

When Hangman assumes control of the Night Shift, he encourages each member to join him in a campaign of terror against Hollywood, pointing to their backgrounds for reasons why they should hate Hollywood. He notes that Tick-Tock once wanted to be a timer in an animation studio. Tick-Tock joins the Night Shift in receiving new power from Satannish, but loses a portion of his soul as a result. He accompanies the Night Shift as they capture Hawkeye, Spider-Woman, and U.S. Agent, then attempt to offer their souls to Satannish.

Tick-Tock is with the Night Shift when they are hired by the crime lord Snapdragon on Count Nefaria's behalf to capture Moon Knight. When Moon Knight refuses Tick-Tock's offer to accompany them, the Night Shift attack, and Tick-Tock accidentally hits Tatterdemalion while trying to shoot Echo. After Echo knocks out Digger, she uses a shovel to stab Tick-Tock. Moon Knight and Echo defeat the Night Shift, who are then arrested by the police. As Tick-Tock is interrogated by the LAPD's Detective Hall, Nefaria's lawyer shows up and ends the interrogation. After Nefaria's lawyer states that the Night Shift are victims of a beating from vigilantes, the Night Shift are released from police custody. Later, Snapdragon and Nefaria confront the Night Shift on why they failed their mission, and Nefaria insults them for their incompetence. Before the Night Shift can answer, Nefaria uses his ionic energy blasts to incinerate them.

== Tiger Snake ==
Tiger Snake is a character appearing in American comic books published by Marvel Comics. Created by Steve Orlando and Cory Smith, he first appeared in Avengers Assemble (vol. 3) #1 (September 2024).

Tiger Snake is a member of the Serpent Society who worships Mephisto. He can generate a lethal poison from his hands, which he claims few can survive.

== Tiger's Beautiful Daughter ==
Tiger's Beautiful Daughter (Li Hua) is a character appearing in American comic books published by Marvel Comics. Created by Ed Brubaker, Matt Fraction, and David Aja, she first appeared in The Immortal Iron Fist #8 (August 2007).

Li Hua is originally from Tiger Island, a prosperous city where she finds little of interest. Her mother and many other soldiers were killed twenty years prior in warfare, with her mother dying shortly after giving birth to her. These events led to Tiger Island's current society of men serving in the militia and women staying at home. In the present, after Tiger Island's old enemies return, Hua rallies Tiger Island's women to fend them off.

In the series Iron Fist: Heart of the Dragon, the Hierophant attacks Tiger Island and the Capital Cities of Heaven to acquire the hearts of its dragons. Tiger's Beautiful Daughter is killed along with Tiger Island's dragon. She ends up being succeeded by Tiger's Faithful Daughter.

== Charlie Tidwell ==
Charlie Tidwell is a character appearing in American comic books published by Marvel Comics. She was created by Phillip Kennedy Johnson and Nic Klein, and first appeared in The Incredible Hulk (vol. 4) #1 (June 2023).

Charlie is a teenage runaway who Bruce Banner meets while traveling around the United States. The two battle the Eldest, the mother of all monsters, as well as Vârcolac, the progenitor of werewolves. Charlie obtains the Godskin, the pelt of the Eldest's daughter Lycana, giving her the ability to transform into a winged werewolf.

== Timberius ==
Timberius is a character appearing in American comic books published by Marvel Comics.

Timberius is a tree-like Inhuman with bark-like skin, branch-like arms, root-like feet, and the ability of chlorokinesis who is one of several Inhuman criminals (which also included Aireo, Falcona, Leonus, Nebulo, and Stallior) that Black Bolt (who used Oracle to interpret for him) finds guilty of treason and is banished from the Hidden Land of the Inhumans to another dimension. When the Hulk attacks Lockjaw, he teleports the Hulk to the dimension where the evil Inhumans have been banished. Maximus appears and recruits them all as part of his military takeover of Attilan, and teleports them all back to the Hidden Land. Maximus seeks a device created by the ancient Inhuman scientist Romnar, which can absorb people. The evil Inhumans use the Hulk to gain access to the device, and build a ray gun to use it to attack Black Bolt. The evil Inhumans squabble over the device for their own ideals of conquest, and Black Bolt is able to defeat them. To try to regain Black Bolt's favor, the evil Inhumans try to stop the Hulk as he rampages through Attilan, only to be defeated by Hulk.

== Tin Man ==
Tin Man is the name of two characters appearing in American comic books published by Marvel Comics.

=== Robert Dolan ===
Robert Dolan is a sheriff in the Old West. The character, created by Joe R. Lansdale and Byron Penaranda, first appeared in Amazing Fantasy (vol. 2) #20 (June 2006). He arrests local thug Jake Rutherford, but is attacked, maimed and beaten nearly to death by the man's brothers. Dolan is saved by being turned into a steam-powered cyborg by his inventor father who also provides a steam-powered robot horse named Tin. Dolan apprehends the Rutherfords and announces to the town that he would continue on as the Steam Sheriff.

=== Owen Backes ===
Owen Backes is a mutant with technopathic abilities. The character, created by Seth Peck, Jefte Palo and Guillermo Mogorron, first appeared in X-Men (vol. 3) #40 (January 2013). After surviving a car accident which killed his girlfriend Maddie, his crude cyborg-like form protects him from the police before both the X-Men and the Freedom Force arrive to take him. Backes reluctantly chooses to help the Freedom Force with his powers, taking the chance to help the US government.

Backes later appears as a student of the Hellfire Club's Hellfire Academy (a direct opponent for the Jean Grey School for Higher Learning), led by Kade Kilgore, which recruits mutants to train to be supervillains for profit.

== Tippy-Toe ==
- Further reading: Tippy-Toe at the Comic Book DB (archived from the original); Tippy-Toe at the Grand Comics Database

Tippy-Toe is a character appearing in American comic books published by Marvel Comics. Created by Dan Slott, she is an Eastern gray squirrel who first appeared in G.L.A. #4 (September 2005).

After Monkey Joe is killed by Leather Boy, Squirrel Girl (Doreen Allene Green) chooses a new squirrel to act as her companion. She considers naming her 'Monkey Joe 2' before settling on 'Tippy-Toe' and giving her a pink ribbon. She recruits an army of local squirrels to aid the Great Lakes Avengers (GLA) in battling Maelstrom and Batroc's Brigade. All of the squirrels die, except Tippy-Toe, who becomes Squirrel Girl's new permanent partner.

=== Tippy-Toe in other media ===
- Tippy-Toe appears in Ultimate Spider-Man.
- Tippy-Toe appears in the Marvel Rising franchise, with vocal effects provided by Dee Bradley Baker.
- Tippy-Toe appears in Spidey and His Amazing Friends, with vocal effects provided by Darin De Paul.
- Tippy-Toe appears in Marvel Rivals.

== Titan ==
Titan is the name of two characters appearing in American comic books published by Marvel Comics.

=== Titan (Imperial Guard) ===
- First appearance: X-Men #107 (October 1977)
- Created by: Chris Claremont and Dave Cockrum
- Species: Unidentified extraterrestrial race
- Teams: Imperial Guard
- Abilities: Expand his body to giant size; Superhuman strength and mass

Titan is a character appearing in American comic books published by Marvel Comics. Created by Chris Claremont and Dave Cockrum, the character first appeared in X-Men #107 (October 1977). Titan is a size-shifting warrior serving in the Royal Elite of the Shi'ar Imperial Guard, a group of super-powered aliens who act as enforcers in the Shi'ar Empire. Titan can expand his body to giant size, and has superhuman strength and mass. Like many original members of the Imperial Guard, Titan is the analog of a character from DC Comics' Legion of Super-Heroes: in this case, Colossal Boy.

The Realm of Kings crossover series sees the Shi'ar team up with the Starjammers to investigate "the Fault", a space-time anomaly that not only threatens Shi'ar space, but all of reality. During the conflict, Titan, Starbolt, Black Light, and Neutron are killed.

A new Titan is recruited from the ranks of the Subguardians and joins the Imperial Guard on a number of subsequent missions.

== Titania ==
Titania is the name of two characters appearing in American comic books published by Marvel Comics.

== Titannus ==
Titannus

Publication information
- Publisher: Marvel Comics
- First appearance: Marvel Team Up (vol. 3) #2 (2005)
- Created by: Robert Kirkman; Scott Kolins

In-story information
- Alter ego: Titannus
- Species: Skrull
- Abilities: Superhuman strength and stamina Invulnerability; Flight; Energy projection Healing factor

Titannus is a character appearing in American comic books published by Marvel Comics.

Originally, Titannus was a Skrull who, lacking shape-shifting abilities, became one of the subjects of the Super-Skrull project, giving him enhanced strength and a healing factor that would allow him to recover from any wound. Leaving his world, he eventually arrives on the planet Trellion, whose inhabitants brainwash him to act as their agent. Believing that he was fleeing an oppressive ruler, he escapes with the woman he loves (against her will) and travels to Earth, seeking the aid of heroes to revolt against Trellion. After his spacecraft crash lands in Japan, Titannus observes the heroes of Earth for several months and attempts to "gain their attention" by destroying Tokyo, defeating the premier superhero of Japan (Sunfire) and killing countless soldiers of the Japanese army.

Sensing the disturbance, Doctor Strange assembles a new team of Defenders to oppose the alien, consisting of Spider-Man, She-Hulk, Ms. Marvel, Nova, and Hulk. The team meets Wolverine in Tokyo, where he is already attempting to fight Titannus. Titannus attempts to befriend them by recounting his brainwashed story, claiming that he had merely lost his temper when attacked by Sunfire, but Doctor Strange senses little truth in Titannus' words. Ultimately, the superheroes are unable to stop Titannus, who defeats the Hulk by absorbing his empowering gamma radiation, as well as breaks She-Hulk's left arm. When Titannus' beloved is woken up by Strange and Nova, the truth is revealed and Titannus, having been so dependent on his love for her, is driven to suicide by her rejection—apparently killing himself by crushing his own head. Spider-Man later speculates that she was angry at the failure of her peoples' plan to attack Earth's heroes.

However, Titannus' healing factor is so advanced that it allowed him to grow a new head, albeit giving him amnesia. Later, insane scientists from Tokyo take control of Titannus and order him to attack the United States, believing that Titannus had been part of a US attempt to conquer Japan. Doctor Strange, Spider-Man, Ms Marvel, She-Hulk, Wolverine, Luke Cage, and Captain America assemble and defeat Titannus, who is taken in by S.H.I.E.L.D., thanks to the new arrival of Crusader, who distracts him by creating an illusionary reality where he killed all of his opponents. Meanwhile, Doctor Strange finds the people controlling him, and modify their technology to keep Titannus dormant.

=== Titannus in other media ===
Titannus appears as a boss in Marvel: Ultimate Alliance, voiced by David Sobolov.

== Titanoboa ==
Titanoboa is a character appearing in American comic books published by Marvel Comics. The character was introduced in the series Avengers Assemble (2024) as a member of the Serpent Society who can grow to a massive size. Titanoboa confronts the Avengers along with the rest of the Serpent Society, but is taken down by She-Hulk, who was overdosed with gamma radiation by Hawkeye.

== Tom Thumb ==
Tom Thumb (Thomas Thompson) is a character appearing in American comic books published by Marvel Comics. Created by Roy Thomas and John Buscema, he first appeared in The Avengers #85 (February 1971). He is a dwarf scientist and inventor. He designed the Squadron Supreme's headquarters and frequently created advanced devices such as a Behavior Modifying Machine that could be used on criminals to change their ways, and a force field belt that protected its wearer.

=== Earth-712 version ===
The character first appears when several members of the Avengers end up in the Squadron Supreme's universe and battle them. The Squadron are later manipulated by the Serpent Cartel, and the team travels to the mainstream Marvel Universe to extend the Cartel's power. They battle the Avengers once more, returning to their own universe in the process, but eventually realize that the Cartel is evil and renounce them.

Alongside the other Squadron members, Thumb is mind-controlled by the Over-Mind and is used in the entity's conquest of the Squadron's Earth. The team is freed by the Defenders, and together they battle and defeat the Over-Mind and Null the Living Darkness].

To help restore the world after the chaos brought upon it by the Over-Mind's conquest, the Squadron resolves to take control of the planet, and the members reveal their secret identities to the world. Fellow Squadron member Nuke asks Thumb to find a cure for his parents' cancer, but Tom Thumb fails. Thumb discovers that he has also developed terminal cancer. Tom Thumb ultimately dies at the team's headquarters in Squadron City and was placed in the Hibernaculum, a form of suspended animation that he invented to preserve the bodies of diseased or recently deceased persons until a remedy could be found for them.

Tom Thumb is regarded as a genius, but he possesses no superhuman powers. He is an expert and innovator in a wide range of scientific and technological fields, including computer science, medicine, psychology, force field technology, and spacecraft design. His abilities also include total recall and great physical dexterity. He is also skilled at manipulating various weaponry of his own design.

=== Supreme Power version ===
In Supreme Power, Tom Thumb is one of a number of convicts who volunteer to act as test subjects for a military experiment, which causes him to shrink to less than one inch high. He joins the government's Squadron Supreme program, and he enters counseling to deal with the trauma of being trapped in a capsule during one mission.

This version of the character apparently died along with the rest of his universe when it collided with another reality.

=== Heroes Reborn version ===
In the 2021 Heroes Reborn timeline, Tom Thumb is a member of the Secret Squadron. This version resembles the original version of Tom Thumb with the size-shifting abilities of the Supreme Power version. During the fight with the Siege Society, Tom Thumb is subdued by Hawkeye.

== Tomazooma ==
Tomazooma is a character appearing in American comic books published by Marvel Comics. Created by Stan Lee and Jack Kirby, it first appeared in Fantastic Four #80 (November 1968).

Tomazooma is a gigantic robot designed to resemble a Native American deity of the Keewazi people. The Red Star Oil Company built the robot to frighten the Keewazi into giving up their oil-rich land. Tomazooma fought Wyatt Wingfoot and the Fantastic Four, who defeated it.

When next seen, Tomazooma had been rebuilt into a cuckoo clock being used at a Bar With No Name. The Reanimator then built Tomazooma back to its original specifications. When the New Warriors attack the Reanimator, Nova blows a hole through Tomazooma's chest.

== Tommy ==
Tommy is a character appearing in American comic books published by Marvel Comics. She first appeared in The Uncanny X-Men #210 (October 1986) and was created by Chris Claremont and John Romita, Jr.

Tommy is a young member of the Morlocks who can become two-dimensional. After being targeted by the Marauders, Tommy tries to flee, but the Marauders track her down to the Morlocks' home. Tommy is killed by Scalphunter, becoming the first casualty of the Marauders' massacre. Long after her death, Tommy was resurrected following the establishment of Krakoa and its resurrection protocols.

=== Tommy in other media ===
- Tommy makes non-speaking cameo appearances in X-Men: The Animated Series.
- Tommy appears in X-Men '97, voiced by Donna J. Fulks. She and the Morlocks relocate to Genosha before being killed by Sentinels.

== Frankie Toomes ==
Frankie Toomes is a character appearing in American comic books published by Marvel Comics.

Frankie Toomes is the son of Vulture, the sister of Valeria Toomes, the wife of Lenora Toomes, and the father of Starling.

== Lenora Toomes ==
Lenora Toomes is a character appearing in American comic books published by Marvel Comics.

Lenora Toomes is the mother of Tiana Toomes, the wife of Frankie Toomes, and the daughter-in-law of Adrian Toomes.

== Valeria Toomes ==
- Further reading: Valeria Toomes at the Comic Book DB (archived from the original); Valeria Toomes at the Grand Comics Database

Valeria Toomes is a character appearing in American comic books published by Marvel Comics. Created by Robert Rodi and John Higgins, she first appeared in Identity Disc #1 (August 2004).

Valeria is the daughter of the Vulture (Adrian Toomes) and his wife Cheryl and the brother of Frankie Toomes. When the family found themselves on the run, Cheryl abandoned Adrian at the grief of Valeria. Years later, Valeria joins S.H.I.E.L.D. under the name Valeria Jessup in the hopes of disconnecting herself from her criminal father. When A.I.M. discovers her true identity in an effort to blackmail her, Valeria contacts her father to retrieve the Identity Disc, a disc containing the files on every costumed hero and villain and their true names. Valeria poses as Valeria Merrick and hires the Vulture along with Deadpool, Juggernaut, Sandman, Bullseye, and Sabretooth. Claiming that she works for Tristram Silver, Valeria "kills" Sandman to snap everyone in line. Everything goes according to plan, and the disc goes to S.H.I.E.L.D. Valeria has a bittersweet reunion with her father; he returns to prison, while she continues to work at S.H.I.E.L.D. as Jessup.

== Toothgnasher and Toothgrinder ==
Toothgnasher and Toothgrinder are characters appearing in American comic books published by Marvel Comics. They are based on Tanngrisnir and Tanngnjóstr from Norse mythology.

Thor usually relies on his hammer Mjölnir to fly. In situations where he must transport passengers or objects, Thor can summon Tanngrisnir and Tanngnjóstr, both also known as Toothgnasher and Toothgrinder, who arrive already harnessed to his chariot, and can be dismissed with equal ease.

The two goats were vital in a later Marvel Comics story; they believed a tale of danger to Odin and summoned reinforcements. They later made sure various Asgardian children were safe when an invading army threatened.

=== Toothgnasher and Toothgrinder in other media ===
- Toothgnasher appears in the Moon Girl and Devil Dinosaur episode "The Devil You Know", voiced by Fred Stoller. This version is a member of the Action Buddies Confidential support group and the sidekick of an unidentified superhero.
- Toothgnasher and Toothgrinder appear in Thor: Love and Thunder. These versions are perpetual screamers inspired by the yelling goat meme.

== Topspin ==
Topspin (Darren Mitchell) is a character appearing in American comic books published by Marvel Comics.

As grandson of the original Human Top, Darren Mitchell has assumed the mantle of his parents. These superpowers skipped a generation, bypassing his father, who tried using mechanical means to simulate the powers, but eventually decided to serve the V-Battalion in a scientific capacity.

Topspin has spent his life with the V-Battalion, to which he is extremely loyal, but he also wants to see the world. Greatly affected by Ameiko Sabuki's death, he is now unsure if he wants to remain with the V-Battalion.

Following the Civil War storyline, Topspin is considered a "potential recruit" for the Initiative program, according to Civil War: Battle Damage Report.

== Torgo ==
Torgo is the name of two characters in Marvel Comics.

=== Robot ===
Torgo is a robot who first appeared in Fantastic Four #91 and was created by Stan Lee and Jack Kirby. Torgo was originally created by the people of the planet Mekka before they were killed by a plague, rendering their robots the planet's sole inhabitants. He eventually becomes a member of the Ravagers.

=== Vampire ===
Torgo is a former general in Attila's army who was inadvertently buried alive. After being unearthed and transformed into a vampire, he is destroyed by Dracula in a duel over leadership.

=== Torgo in other media ===
The robot version of Torgo appears in the Avengers Assemble episode "Mojo World", voiced by Roger Craig Smith. This version is a former gladiator who worked for Mojo.

== Tower ==
- Further reading: Tower at the Comic Book DB (archived from the original)

Tower (Edward Pasternak) is a character appearing in American comic books published by Marvel Comics. Created by Bob Layton and Jackson Guice, he first appeared in X-Factor #2 (March 1986). Tower is a mutant, and draws on additional extra-dimensional mass to increase or decrease his size.

Tower fights the original X-Factor as a member of the Alliance of Evil, a group of mutants brought together by Apocalypse. He is killed by the X-Cutioner in The Uncanny X-Men Annual #17 (June 1993).

== Toy Soldier ==
Toy Soldier is a robot created by Shannon Stillwell by reverse-engineering technology from the Super-Adaptoid, possessing the combined powers of the Avengers. Spider-Boy persuades Toy Soldier to be a hero, resulting in him breaking free from Killionaire's control. Toy Soldier goes on to help Spider-Boy fight Madame Monstrosity, using his intellect to restore Madame Monstrosity's Humanimals to their human forms.

== Trader ==
Trader is the name of two characters in Marvel Comics.

=== Cort Zo Tinnus ===
Cort Zo Tinnus is one of the Elders of the Universe. He first appeared in Silver Surfer (Vol. 3) #4 (July, 1987), created by Steve Englehart and Marshall Rogers. Trader's specialty is commerce and trade. Like all Elders, Trader is very long-lived, is unaffected by hostile environments, aging, or disease and can manipulate cosmic energies.

=== Chicago Morlocks version ===
Trader is a mutant with the ability to cloak other people's retinas, making him invisible to the naked eye. He first appeared in Morlocks #1 (April 2002), created by Geoff Johns and Shawn Martinbrough. Trader was a Wall Street stockbroker before he was fired for being a mutant. He moved to Chicago and joined the Morlocks. He helped rescue Cell. He was shot dead by police in the sewers when protecting Electric Eve.

=== Trader in other media ===
- The Morlock Trader appears in The Gifted, portrayed by D. James Jones.
- The Elder Trader appears in Marvel Realm of Champions, voiced by Tyler James Nicol.

== Dr. Seward Trainer ==
Dr. Seward Trainer is a genetics expert employed by the High Evolutionary. Sent to spy on cloning experiments being conducted by Miles Warren, he becomes an assistant to Warren himself. However, one night he is caught stealing some of Warren's files by Scrier, an agent of Norman Osborn. Scrier uses this opportunity to blackmail Trainer by threatening to tell Warren about his unfaithfulness. Trainer reluctantly agrees to follow Scrier's requests, unaware he is actually a pawn in a much grander scheme. After some months in New York, Trainer comes into contact with Ben Reilly (the Scarlet Spider). The two became good friends and Trainer becomes a father figure to Ben. His daughter Carolyn Trainer briefly takes the identity of the second Doctor Octopus. This causes a lot of commotion, and Ben and Trainer are even forced to fight her, becoming closer friends in the process.

However, he is targeted by Spider-Man due to his close ties with Ben, one of Spider-Man's biggest foes. Trainer participates in a charade to protect Ben, but is killed by Gaunt before he can reveal the truth of the ploy to Ben.

== Transonic ==
Transonic

Publication information
- Publisher: Marvel Comics
- First appearance: Uncanny X-Men #526 (July 2010)
- Created by: Matt Fraction; Kieron Gillen

In-story information
- Alter ego: Laurie Tromette
- Species: Human Mutant
- Team affiliations: X-Men in training The Lights; X-Men
- Notable aliases: The First Light
- Abilities: Supersonic flight General physiological enhancement

Transonic (Laurie Tromette) is a character appearing in American comic books published by Marvel Comics. She first appeared in Uncanny X-Men #526, in the first chapter of the "Five Lights" storyline, and was created by Matt Fraction and Kieron Gillen. She is one of the "Five Lights"—a group of mutants who manifested their abilities after the events of "Second Coming".

Transonic first appeared in Uncanny X-Men as a teenager who was having difficulty completing, let alone coping with, her mutation. Following her introduction, she, along with Hope Summers, Velocidad, Oya, Zero, and Primal, began to feature in the series Generation Hope. She continues to make appearances in Uncanny X-Men as well.

Laurie Tromette is a 19-year-old college student living in Vancouver when her X-gene first manifests. At first, her mutation takes no real form. She experiences hair loss, skin changes, and flu-like symptoms, but according to Cyclops, "nothing resembling anything." She becomes so distressed that she decides to commit suicide by jumping off of a building. In an effort to save Laurie's life, Hope jumps off the building with her—touching Laurie and activating her power of flight. Laurie pledges to follow Hope and eventually moves to Utopia with the rest of the X-Men.

Laurie's primary ability is that of supersonic flight. Her body not only propels itself through the air at transonic speeds, but also possesses reactive properties that change her physical form to grant enhanced maneuverability. Her body has changed shape to become larger and winged (resembling a flying fish) when traveling at high altitudes and missile-shaped when traveling at high speeds.

== Donald Trask ==
Donald Trask III is a character appearing in American comic books published by Marvel Comics, in association with the X-Men. Created by Grant Morrison and Frank Quitely, the character first appeared in New X-Men #114 (July 2001).

The nephew of the Sentinels' creator Bolivar Trask, Donald Trask is recruited by Cassandra Nova since the Wild Sentinels can only obey Trask's orders, but Nova is done copying all of his DNA and kills Trask due to not longer needing him.

== Larry Trask ==
Larry Trask is the mutant son of the Sentinels' creator Bolivar Trask. At the age of five, Larry's mutant power of precognition manifests when he predicts his mother's death. Soon after, he loses his older sister Tanya Trask, a mutant time-traveler who becomes lost in the timestream.

Fearful of the "mutant menace", Bolivar crafts a medallion that blocks Larry's visions them. As his son grows older, Bolivar enlists Larry's help in the creation of the first wave of Sentinels. Bolivar occasionally removes Larry's medallion so that he can secretly observe and record Larry's predictions about future mutants.

Following his father's death, Trask uses Bolivar's notes to create a new, stronger wave of Sentinels. He is aided in his effort by Federal Judge Robert Chalmers, a friend of Bolivar. Trask creates a base for his Sentinels in the Colorado Rockies, and orders robots to abduct and detain all known mutants. One of these mutants is Alex Summers whom Larry gives a containment suit to control his unstable powers. Following a series of conflicts with the X-Men, Trask is killed when one of his Sentinels falls onto him.

Larry Trask is resurrected on Krakoa. Following the end of the Krakoan Age, Larry is recruited to develop a team of Sentinels to apprehend mutants. Unbeknownst to his superiors, Larry develops a team of Sentinel cyborgs created from the nanotechnology in Juston Seyfert's body rather than a team of traditional Sentinels. The Sentinels share the goal of protecting humanity, the directive given by Juston to his Sentinel companion. After learning of this, Corina Ellis removes Larry's medallion and imprisons him to exploit his powers.

== Simon Trask ==
Simon Trask is the brother of Bolivar Trask and a member of Humanity's Last Stand.

=== Simon Trask in other media ===
Simon Trask appears in the Iron Man: Armored Adventures episode "The X-Factor".

== Trauma ==
Trauma is the name of two characters appearing in American comic books published by Marvel Comics.

=== Troh-Maw ===
Troh-Maw is the son of Lord Armageddon, the ruler of an extraterrestrial race known as the Troyjans. Trauma comes to Earth to collect on a debt of the Pantheon's leader, Agamemnon, who promised the Troyjans one of his descendants in exchange for technology to extend his children's lifespans.

Trauma often storms the Pantheon's headquarters to take Atalanta, who always draws him back. After the Hulk joins the Pantheon, Trauma corners Atalanta in the Himalayas and confessed his love for her, but is defeated by the Hulk before he can kidnap her. Trauma later abducts Atalanta and brings her to his homeworld, with the Hulk and the Pantheon in pursuit. The Hulk arrives in time to stop the wedding and challenges Trauma to a duel. Their fight ends when Trauma stumbles over a piece of armor, which pierces his heart. Before dying, Trauma proves his love to Atalanta by releasing the Pantheon from their debt and begging Lord Armageddon to allow the Pantheon to return to Earth.

=== Terrance Ward ===
Terrance Ward is a student of the Initiative and a mutant who can transform into manifestations of the fears of people near him. His powers previously drove him away from his family, and sent his mother to an insane asylum.

After his powers inadvertently lead to the death of Michael Van Patrick, Henry Peter Gyrich takes Trauma to be privately taught by Danielle Moonstar to help him control his powers. At first, Trauma attempts to reject Moonstar's help, believing that his powers should be neutralized instead. Trauma transforms into the Demon Bear and attacks Moonstar, but is stopped and reluctantly accepts her help.

A psychotic clone of Michael Van Patrick, calling himself "Killed in Action", attacks and kills Trauma. In the aftermath of KIA's rampage, Trauma's fellow trainees visit his coffin and witness him suddenly come back to life. With no knowledge of how he has returned to the living, Trauma chooses to remain in Camp Hammond as a counselor in order to get answers.

In the Avengers: The Initiative Special, it is revealed that Trauma's biological father is the demon Nightmare. Nightmare uses Terry's body to attack the Initiative members until Penance helps Terry regain control, causing Nightmare to release him and disappear. Justice offers to let Trauma join the Avengers Resistance, but Trauma decides to leave and go on his own to figure how to prevent Nightmare from taking over again.

=== Trauma in other media ===
- Troh-Maw appears in The Incredible Hulk: The Pantheon Saga.
- The Terrance Ward incarnation of Trauma appears as a playable character in Lego Marvel's Avengers.

== Judas Traveller ==
Dr. Judas Traveller is a character appearing in American comic books published by Marvel Comics. Created by Terry Kavanagh and Steven Butler, he first appeared in Web of Spider-Man #117 (October 1994), part of the "Clone Saga" storyline. The character's agenda is to analyze the true nature of evil. Taking interest in Spider-Man and his clone, Traveller, with his ally Scrier and his Host (a group of four of his students), pit Spider-Man both teaming and against his clone in a test of motivation. He was described by Spider-Man writer Glenn Greenberg as a deus ex machina character with ill-defined powers: "no one – not the writers, not the editors – seemed to know who or what the heck Judas Traveller was. He was seemingly this immensely powerful, quasi-mystical being with amazing abilities, but what was the real deal with him? ... But to be honest, a character like Traveller didn't really fit into Spider-Man's world." As such, Traveller's role would remain a mystery to readers for a while, as writers dropped him in and out of this saga. It was eventually revealed that everything Traveller knew about himself is a lie. In reality, he is a criminal psychologist who suffered a mental breakdown, awakening his dormant mutant powers to alter perception. With these abilities, he often appears far more powerful than he really is. This is the truth that Chakra told Ben Reilly. During this story, Traveller is betrayed by the Scrier, and rescued by Ben Reilly and his own love interest, Chakra. He is a pawn of Norman Osborn against Spider-Man, and is eventually betrayed by Osborn.

Judas Traveller is a creature who has walked the planet for ages, seeking the true meaning of evil and how it manifests within humans. His memories are filled with past events which he witnessed and studied to understand the human soul. He eventually set his sights on studying Spider-Man, as he could not yet comprehend if Spider-Man was the cause of evil re-presenting itself in his enemies or a beacon of good that would stand against evil.

== Travesty ==
Travesty is a character appearing in American comic books published by Marvel Comics. In the Marvel 2099 reality, his real name is Rico Estevez.

On the original Marvel 2099 reality of Earth-928, Rico Estevez is a sergeant in the Private Eye who was fired for trying to kill Spider-Man 2099, which leads to him being evicted and losing his possessions. Estevez is approached by Angela Daskalakis, who takes him to the indy town of Nightshade. There, he is experimented on and transformed into Travesty, a monster with four arms, green skin, fangs, and tentacled hair.

In the unified Marvel 2099 reality of Earth-2099, Travesty is a member of the Sinister Squadron. Unlike the Earth-928 version, he does not possess tentacled hair and instead has three long ponytails.

== Lorelei Travis ==
Lorelei Travis is a mutant character that debuted in District X #1 (May 2004) by David Hine and David Yardin. She was a young exotic dancer with prehensile hair that was one of the few mutants to retain their abilities after the Decimation. She initially takes refuge with the 198 at the X-Mansion, before moving with the remaining mutants to San Francisco.

== Roland Treece ==
Roland Treece is the CEO of Treece International and a leading member of the Life Foundation. Using a park recreation project as a cover, he searches for a lost stockpile of gold buried beneath a park in San Francisco before dealing with interference from Venom. Treece nearly dies fighting Spider-Man and Venom, but is ultimately saved by Eddie Brock. Treece next appears as Carlton Drake's employee who he attempts to kill through an incorrect serum administration but his employer survives. Treece and Orwell Taylor are arrested by federal agents for their part in Drake's illegal projects.

=== Roland Treece in other media ===
Roland Treece appears in Venom, portrayed by Scott Haze. This version is the Life Foundation's chief of security and Carlton Drake's chief enforcer until he is killed by Anne Weying.

== Triage ==
Triage (Christopher Muse) is a mutant character in Marvel Comics. First appearing in All-New X-Men #1 (November 2012), he was created by Brian Bendis and Stuart Immonen. Triage is a mutant with the ability to manipulate the lifeforce of others, healing or resurrecting them.

Triage was recruited by Cyclops as a student, forming a close bond with Tempus. He later was killed by the Office of National Emergency, who administered a lethal dose of a mutant "cure". He was resurrected on Krakoa and begins working with the Marauders emergency response team.

== Trick Shot ==
Trick Shot (sometimes spelled Trickshot) is the name of two characters in Marvel Comics.

=== Buck Chisholm ===
Buck Chisholm first appeared in Solo Avengers #1 (December 1987) and was created by Tom DeFalco and Mark Bright. Trick Shot's introduction was a retroactive addition to the backstory of Clint Barton (Hawkeye), explaining how the character became a talented archer. Chisholm is an archer who worked in the Carson Carnival of Travelling Wonders and agreed to train Barton after losing a game of poker to Jacques Duquesne.

=== Trick Shot in other media ===
The Buck Chisholm incarnation of Trick Shot appears in the Avengers Assemble episode "Crime and Circuses", voiced by Travis Willingham. This version is a member of the Circus of Crime.

== Trump ==
Trump (Carlton Sanders) is a character appearing in American comic books published by Marvel Comics. He first appeared in Daredevil #203 (February 1984) and was created by Steven Grant and Geof Isherwood.

Born in Bartlesville, Oklahoma, Trump is a professional criminal and magician who uses illusions and parlor tricks to commit his crimes. He has also worked as a children's television host. While in Manhattan, he attempted to steal a shipment of guns for unnamed clients in the southwest. He encountered and was captured by Daredevil. Trump some time later interrupted a stage performance at a Manhattan comedy club attended by Steve Rogers and Rachel Leighton, and was unknowingly thwarted by Black Mamba.

Trump is an athletic man with no superhuman powers. He is a fair hand-to-hand combatant, but he generally avoids physical confrontation and employs weaponry when necessary. He is an expert at sleight-of-hand, and a skilled marksman. He has a college degree in drama, and has extensively studied clowning, illusions, bridge, and stage magic.

Trump carries a cane which shoots pellets from one end, and has a taser (electrical "stun-tip") at the other. He wears a cape containing pouches with various tricks including decks of cards, nylon ribbons, metal rings, handcuffs, scarves, etc. He wears gloves with pockets containing a garrote and razor blades, and wears boots with hollow heels containing various lockpicking and escape tools. He also has a number of trained pigeons and tame rabbits.

== Tuck ==
Tuck is a character appearing in British comics published by Marvel UK and American comic books published by Marvel Comics. The character was created by Dan Abnett and Liam Sharp, and first appeared in Death's Head II #3 (May 1992).

Tuck is a Replicated Organic, an artificial human created on the planet Lionheart. She was illegally created by a "tissue broker", who, fearing the authorities (all higher technology is forbidden), sold her to a brothel. She escaped and eventually joined Death's Head and his group of outlaws, and accompanies him on his complex travels through time and alternate universes.

During an unspecified time, she is intentionally infected by a (eventually harmless) strain of the "plague perfection" – a synthetic virus designed to target only replicated humans and cyborgs. The search produced nothing, as there is no cure.

Tuck is a synthetic human, designed to be slightly superior to a normal human in physical abilities. She is skilled in stealth and combat using medieval weapons. At one point, she gains a powerful cosmic artifact called the 'Sapphire Lotus', which boosts her strength and durability to many times greater than normal and grants her the ability to generate large amounts of energy. She later loses all but a small shard of this artifact, which still boosts her strength fivefold and increases her athletic abilities and healing rate.

== Tula ==
Tula was the pet black panther of Nazi scientist Doctor Agony. Agony experimented on ways to make living creatures immune to pain. Due to being manipulated by Captain America, Tula and Agony end up killing each other.

== Tumult ==
Tumult is the name of two characters in Marvel Comics.

=== Euroforce ===
Tumult is a member of Euroforce, led by the Black Knight. She aids the Avengers against Morgan le Fay and her undead army.

=== The Trickster Chimaera ===
Tumult is an amalgamation of numerous trickster gods who was created and used by Ora Serrata to wreak havoc on Arakko and support her own rule. He finds a sole worshipper in Switch, a former member of the Hellions. Switch and Tumult swap bodies via Switch's powers, leaving Switch to be killed by the Arakki. Tumult, in Switch's body, plans to leave Arakko to explore the world.

== Lord Turac ==
Lord Turac is a Turkish warlord who overthrows the Wallachian voivode Prince Vlad Dracula in 1459. Turac himself mortally wounds the prince in battle, but, wanting to keep him alive to use as a puppet ruler of Wallachia, brings him to the Romani healer Lianda. Lianda, secretly a vampire, instead turns Dracula into a vampire. Ignorant of this, Turac imprisons Dracula in the prince's own castle and later kills his wife Maria. Enraged, Dracula breaks free from his prison and bites Turac across the throat, leaving him for dead. Turac returns as a vampire and returns to his castle in Ankara, going on a killing spree. When he attacks his daughter Elianne, he accidentally impales himself on a spear. With his dying words, Turac implores Elianne to take revenge on Dracula.

== Tusk ==
Tusk is an Inhuman with tusk-like protrusions on his shoulders who possesses super-strength and the ability to create miniature clones of himself. He is a member of the Dark Riders, a team of Inhumans who serve Apocalypse and carry out his "survival of the fittest" program of eliminating mutants deemed to be weak.

He and the Dark Riders reappear against Magneto's X-Men. The Riders are trying to kill mutant healers, but are ambushed by Magneto on Genosha. It is assumed that they are dead as Magneto tied them to a bomb that leveled the entire island.

=== Tusk in other media ===
- Tusk appears in X-Men: The Animated Series, voiced by Howard Jerome. This version is a mutant who initially works as a mechanic in the town of Skull Mesa and later joins Magneto's army in the series finale "Graduation Day".
- Tusk appears in X-Men: Mutant Apocalypse.
- Tusk appears as a boss in X-Men 2: Clone Wars.
- Tusk was developed into an action figure in an early X-Men line by Toy Biz. The toy featured a miniature duplicate hidden in his back.

== Twilight ==
Twilight is a character appearing in American comic books published by Marvel Comics. First appearing in 2099 A.D. Genesis (January 1996), she was created by Warren Ellis and Dale Eaglesham.

In the year 2099, President Doom contacts Cerebra of the X-Men 2099 to inform her of a recent prophecy about a "Mutant Messiah". She undertakes the task of locating and training possible candidates and bringing them to Halo City, one of which is Twilight.

Little is known about the girl before she arrives at Halo City, but she soon becomes part of the teen group X-Nation. Some time later, Avian decides to mount a mission to recapture Willow in a bid to be the first to find the messiah for himself. He attacks the children and recapturing Willow. Wanting to rescue their friend, X-Nation decides to infiltrate the Million Palms facility and save her. At first, Twilight is unwilling to go, but then agreed after mishearing a conversation between Cerebra and Sister Nicholas in which she thought they were going to experiment on the children. However, their fledgling efforts end in their capture. They are able to escape, but upon returning home, they find Halo City devastated.

Twilight can generate a reality-warping "sphere of influence" in which she could do things such as fly, become intangible, teleport herself and others, and cause things to burn, shrink, explode, melt, or reform in various ways. She also displays a latent form of telepathy which Exodus is unable to eavesdrop on; whether this is a reality-warping effect or a different mutation is unknown.

== Tyger Tiger ==
Tyger Tiger (Jessán Hoan) is a character featured in American comic books published by Marvel Comics. The character first appeared in Uncanny X-Men #229 (January 1988), and was created by Chris Claremont and Marc Silvestri.

Jessán Hoan was working at her family's bank when she was kidnapped by the Reavers. She was partially brainwashed by Pretty Boy before being rescued by the X-Men. She returned to her family, but was ostracized by them, due to her surviving the attack while members of her family did not.

Jessán moved to Madripoor in search of Roche, the crime lord responsible for the attack. She took on the name Tyger Tiger and became involved in the criminal underworld. She was assisted by Wolverine in becoming the new crime lord of the island, but warned her to not become like previous crime lords, or he would deal with her.

=== Tyger Tiger in other media ===
Tyger Tiger appears in Marvel's Wolverine, voiced by Kelly Hu. This version is a bar owner in Madripoor and was married to Mystique until leaving her due to the latter's complicity in Nathaniel Essex's schemes.

== Tyrak ==
Tyrak is a character appearing in American comic books published by Marvel Comics. He was created by Gerry Conway and George Perez and first appeared in The Avengers #154 (December 1976).

Tyrak is a size-shifting Atlantean warrior, serving in the army of the conqueror Attuma. He has served in a number of missions for Attuma, and has fought the Avengers on more than one occasion.

In the storyline Fear Itself, Tyrak helps Attuma, Attuma's sister Aradnea, and Tiger Shark take over New Atlantis and attack the surface world.

== Tyrannus ==
- First appearance: The Incredible Hulk #5 (January 1963)
- Created by: Stan Lee and Jack Kirby
- Aliases: Romulus Augustulus
- Further reading: Tyrannus at Comic Vine; Tyrannus at League of Comic Geeks; Tyrannus at Marvel Database

Tyrannus (Romulus Augustulus) is a character appearing in American comic books published by Marvel Comics. The character first appeared in The Incredible Hulk #5 (January 1963), and was created by Stan Lee and Jack Kirby. The character is a fictionalized depiction of Romulus Augustulus and was inspired by Ayesha, the protagonist of H. Rider Haggard's 1887 novel She: A History of Adventure.

In the Roman Empire, Tyrannus claims to be a "sorcerer" but is actually a scientist far ahead of his time. When he tries to conquer Britain, he is exiled by King Arthur and Merlin to Subterranea, a network of caves and tunnels miles beneath the Earth's surface. There, Tyrannus discovers a race of orange-skinned semi-humanoid Subterraneans who are eager to find in him a new master to serve. He also discovers a pool of liquid which he drinks to maintain his youth through the centuries. The Subterraneans acquaint Tyrannus with examples and records of technology designed by the Deviants, their original masters. Tyrannus' scientific genius enables him to master and improve upon the Deviants' scientific wonders over the centuries. Tyrannus becomes emperor of the Tyrannoid Subterraneans and an aspiring conqueror.

In the modern era, Tyrannus is finally ready to use this technology and the Subterraneans in conquering the surface world. He makes several attempts as well as fighting wars against Mole Man and the Hulk.

Tyrannus is granted superhuman longevity and youth after drinking from the Fountain of Youth in Subterranea; he is dependent on this fountain to maintain his youth and immortality. He possesses various lingering psionic abilities after his merger with the cobalt "Flame of Life" in El Dorado, including telepathy, mind control of others, and the ability to drain the life force of others; these abilities are not demonstrated in later appearances. He is an extraordinary scientific genius that Bruce Banner has acknowledged as superior to himself. He masters the advanced technology of the Deviants, which he found in Subterranea, and makes further advances on it. Tyrannus has limited mystic knowledge of sorcery.

Tyrannus often uses ancient Roman weaponry (e.g., swords and spears), but also has access to weapons created by Deviant technology (including guns projecting various types of radiation) and other advanced technological weaponry. He has designed other devices based on Deviant technology and his own innovations, which are manufactured by Subterraneans under his supervision. These include teleportation devices, flying vehicles, and gigantic earth-borers.

== Tyro ==
Tyro is a character appearing in Marvel Comics. The character, created by Dan Abnett, Andy Lanning and Paul Pelletier, first appeared in Nova vol. 4 #11 (March 2008).

Tyro is a techno-organic extraterrestrial who is Warlock's adopted son.
