= Redstone (comics) =

- Redstone fighting Hyperion

Publication information
- Publisher: Marvel Comics
- First appearance: (First) Squadron Supreme #9 (May 1986) (Second) Supreme Power #12 (October 2004)
- Created by: (Squadron Supreme) Mark Gruenwald (Supreme Power) J. Michael Straczynski; Gary Frank

In-story information
- Alter ego: (both) Michael Redstone
- Place of origin: Earth
- Team affiliations: (First) Squadron Supreme; Redeemers (Second) Chinese government
- Abilities: (First) Superhuman strength (Second) Superhuman strength, invulnerability, Flash-Vision

Redstone is the name of two characters appearing in American comic books published by Marvel Comics.

== Fictional character biography ==
=== Squadron Supreme ===
Michael Redstone is an Apache born on a reservation somewhere in the Southwest United States of "Other-Earth", or "Earth-S", later known as Earth-712. Known simply as Redstone, he is a part of Nighthawk's Redeemers. Like the Greek god Antaeus, Redstone draws his power from the Earth and loses much of his strength when not in contact with the ground.

With the other Redeemers, Redstone battles the Squadron Supreme in Squadron City, forcing them to end their dictatorship over the United States. During the battle, Redstone personally bests Squadron leader Hyperion alongside Lamprey.

Redstone travels into outer space with the Squadron to confront Nth Man and prevent him from destroying the universe. Upon leaving Earth's atmosphere, Redstone becomes ill and loses much of his physical mass. His condition proves to be untreatable, not improving even after he returns to Earth. Redstone eventually dies from his illness.

=== Supreme Power ===
Michael Redstone is a renegade soldier and serial killer who volunteers to be given a retro-virus based on Hyperion's DNA, giving him superhuman strength, durability, and "Flash vision". Redstone resumes his killing spree, attracting the attention of Nighthawk. Due to the detective work of Nighthawk and the assistance of Hyperion and Blur, Redstone is apprehended.

Redstone escapes government control and begins working for the Chinese government, whose intent is to counterbalance the threat presented by the Squadron Supreme. Redstone confronts Hyperion in Los Angeles and unveils a nuclear weapon that will explode if it does not receive a signal from him every five minutes. Blur confronts Redstone alongside Nighthawk and Hyperion.

== Powers and abilities ==
The Redstone of the Squadron Supreme's Earth possesses superhuman strength, stamina, and durability. His life force and superhuman powers were dependent on his contact with the Earth and its atmosphere. He was a good hand-to-hand combatant, and was coached from Nighthawk and Squadron Supreme members.
