= Moonglow (comics) =

Publication information
- Publisher: Marvel Comics
- First appearance: Squadron Supreme #10 (June 1986)
- Created by: Mark Gruenwald

In-story information
- Full name: Melissa Hanover
- Team affiliations: Redeemers; Squadron Supreme
- Abilities: Illusion projection

Moonglow is a character appearing in American comic books published by Marvel Comics. She was a member of a team of superheroes, Squadron Supreme.

The Supreme Squadron members exist in numerous alternate universes, but their main and original timeline is Earth-712.

== Publication history ==
Many of the Squadron Supreme's members are based on existing DC Comics characters, with Moonglow being based on Gypsy.

== Fictional character biography ==
=== Melissa Hanover ===
Melissa Hanover is recruited by Nighthawk to serve in his Redeemers and combat the influence of the Squadron Supreme's "Utopia Program". Hanover is insecure and uses her ability to generate illusions to disguise her true appearance. She joined the Squadron to help overthrow it from within. She steals the plans for the behavior modification device, then openly joins the Redeemers' battle against the Squadron Supreme.

When the team leaves to confront Nth Man, Melissa Hanover turns over the Moonglow identity to Arcanna.

=== Arcanna ===
Arcanna Jones initially works as a medium until she is recruited into the Squadron Supreme as Arcanna. She and the Squadron are brainwashed by the Overmind and forced to battle the Defenders. She is cured and battles the Overmind alongside the Defenders.

She joins in the Squadron decision to assume control of their Earth's United States, but abstains on the Squadron vote to use the behavior modification machine and become involved in its "Utopia Program." Arcanna's son Benjamin, who was destined to become a Sorcerer Supreme, becomes the new Nth Man, with Thomas Lightner (the original Nth Man) becoming Sorcerer Supreme in his place.

== Powers and abilities ==
Moonglow can cast illusions by modifying the perceptions of other beings. She can alter her appearance as well as others', in order to manipulate or confuse. She cannot maintain her illusions when unconscious, nor can she affect machines, such as cameras. She can use her powers to create the illusion of artificial high or low gravity.

She is a fair hand-to-hand combatant, having received coaching from Nighthawk and Power Princess.
