= Inertia (Marvel Comics) =

Marvel Comics superhero

Publication information
- Publisher: Marvel Comics
- First appearance: (First); Squadron Supreme #10 (June 1986) (Second); Supreme Power #18 (October 2005)
- Created by: (First); Mark Gruenwald and Paul Ryan (Second); J. Michael Straczynski; Gary Frank

In-story information
- Alter ego: Edith "Eddy" Freiberg
- Team affiliations: (First); America Redeemers; Squadron Supreme (Second); The Squadron Supreme
- Abilities: Transfer of kinetic energy into object or person

Inertia is the name of two separate but related superheroes appearing in American comic books published by Marvel Comics. Both are associated with the Squadron Supreme and are loosely based on DC Comics character Vixen, though the characters share little in common with their counterpart.

== Fictional character biography ==
=== Inertia (Squadron Supreme) ===
Edith Freiberg is a member of the Squadron Supreme with the ability to absorb and redirect kinetic energy. She is recruited by Nighthawk to the team of superpowered "Redeemers", but later joins the Squadron Supreme's "Utopia Program" in hopes of stopping the Redeemers. Inertia is revealed to have joined the Squadron Supreme as a double agent. During her time in the Squadron Supreme, she enters a relationship with Haywire.

Alongside the Squadron Supreme and Master Menace, Inertia battles Nth Man, an entity who is encroaching into the Squadron Supreme's universe. Inertia is overloaded by energy and dies after attempting to attack Nth Man, who proves to be too large for her powers to affect.

=== Inertia (Supreme Power) ===
Edith Freiberg is a lesbian Army private, first introduced in Squadron Supreme: High Command. She is first seen trashing a bar and attacking several men before being introduced to the public as part of the Squadron Supreme.

Edith's father was the head of a conservative church and believed her powers to be demonic in nature. Unable to harm Edith, he would beat her mother instead. When Edith was attacked and raped by three boys from her school, she chose not to defend herself, knowing that doing so would result in her mother being beaten. After her mother was killed in a car accident, Edith killed her father, then killed the boys who had raped her.
