= Master Menace =

Marvel Comics character

Master Menace is a character appearing in American comic books published by Marvel Comics. Two different versions of the character appear in two separate (but related) continuities, Squadron Supreme and Supreme Power. Both bear the real name of Dr. Emil Burbank, though the former character has the middle name of "Zebediah".

Master Menace is an analogue of Lex Luthor with elements of Doctor Doom. Master Menace is a supergenius inventor and is gifted in numerous fields of physical science. He usually wears a suit of powered armor with an arsenal of built-in weapons, which enables him to fight superhumans on a more equal basis (especially his nemesis, Hyperion).

== Publication history ==
Master Menace first appeared in Thor #280 (February 1979), and was created by Roy Thomas and Wayne Boring.

== Fictional character biography ==
=== Squadron Supreme ===
Master Menace

Publication information
- Publisher: Marvel Comics
- First appearance: Thor #280 (February 1979)
- Created by: Roy Thomas and Wayne Boring

In-story information
- Alter ego: Emil Zebediah Burbank
- Team affiliations: Squadron Supreme; America Redeemers
- Notable aliases: Master Menace
- Abilities: Genius level inventor, Powered armor Various weapons

Originally, Hyperion encounters Emil Burbank (Master Menace) on Earth-712 (sometimes called "Earth-S"). Master Menace battles Hyperion while the hero is producing a film directed by Emil's brother, L.L. Burbank. It is then revealed that this Hyperion is an evil alternate universe version of Hyperion who has been impersonating his heroic counterpart. Burbank works with Hyperion to imprison Thor, but is taken captive and trapped in an interdimensional vacuum.

When the Squadron are rebuilding America after the devastation caused by Overmind, Master Menace concentrates his efforts on conquering the Middle East. He gives shelter to three supervillains: Remnant, Pinball, and Mink, sending them to Earth-616. He later supplies the Redeemers with a way to reverse the brainwashing technology of the Squadron.

In Squadron Supreme: Death of a Universe, Emil Burbank ages fifteen years after going into the 41st century with Scarlet Centurion to build a device to stop Nth Man. In Squadron Supreme: New World Order, Burbank appears as an old man at the mercy of large, multi-national corporations and using the Squadron's own Utopia technologies.

=== Supreme Power ===
Emil Burbank

Publication information
- Publisher: Marvel Comics
- First appearance: Supreme Power #18 (October 2005)
- Created by: J. Michael Straczynski; Gary Frank

In-story information
- Team affiliations: Squadron Supreme
- Abilities: Superhuman intelligence

Emil Burbank is a genius with multiple degrees in different fields of science. As a child, he drugged and sexually abused his older sister, eventually leaving her in a permanent catatonic state. At age 18, Burbank arranged for his parents to be killed in a car accident.

Burbank agrees to work for the government and is tasked with capturing or killing Hyperion. While fighting Hyperion, Arcanna's quantum powers, Nuke's radioactive blast, and Hyperion's flash vision combine to create an effect that sends them all to a possible future, where Hyperion and most of the other heroes wage war to "save" humanity.

After returning to the present, the team is sent to Uganda to apprehend John M'Butu, a tribal leader with the power of verbal suggestion who calls himself the Voice. Burbank reveals that he has developed counter measures to defend himself from all of his teammates except for Hyperion and Doctor Spectrum.

== Powers and abilities ==
Emil Burbank was recruited to the Squadron because he was tested by the military and found to have been exposed to a retrovirus that had been released from Hyperion's spacecraft and bestowed superhuman abilities on numerous people around the world. Even though Burbank's enhanced intellect is a direct result of the retro-virus, Burbank denies it, insisting that his genius is his own doing.

Though not displaying any physical super powers, Burbank demonstrates that he can defend himself in combat situations by the use of certain types of technology.
