= Power Princess =

- Power Princess in Ultimate Hulk Annual #1 (December 2008). Art by Marko Djurdjević and Danny Miki.

Publication information
- Publisher: Marvel Comics
- First appearance: Defenders #112 (October 1982).
- Created by: J. M. DeMatteis and Don Perlin

In-story information
- Alter ego: Princess Zarda
- Species: Utopian
- Place of origin: Earth-712
- Team affiliations: Supreme Power; Ultimates; Squadron Supreme; Golden Agency; Exiles
- Partnerships: Hyperion
- Notable aliases: Claire Debussy; Princess of Power; Zarda Shelton
- Abilities: Superhuman strength, speed, agility, stamina, durability, and reflexes; Extended longevity; Flight; Skilled armed and unarmed combatant

Zarda, commonly known as Power Princess, is a fictional character appearing in American comic books published by Marvel Comics. Multiple versions of the character have appeared, each from alternate realities in Marvel's multiverse.

== Publication history ==
The original version of the character was created by J. M. DeMatteis and Don Perlin, and first appeared in Defenders #112 (October 1982) as a member of the Squadron Supreme, an analog of the Justice League. More recently, the character joined the reality-hopping Exiles.

Another version of the character appeared in Marvel's MAX imprint title Supreme Power.

== Fictional character biography ==
=== Squadron Supreme ===
Princess Zarda of Earth-712 lived on Utopia Isle, a small island in the southern sea, untouched by outside civilization. The Utopians believe themselves to be the result of genetic experimentation conducted upon humanity by the alien Kree; they are, indeed, the equivalent on the Squadron's Earth of the Inhumans. While most humans were making flint spearheads, the Utopians developed an advanced utopia based on peace, fellowship and experience or learning. After the outside world made the first atom bomb, the Utopians believed their way of life was in jeopardy. Building a starship, they left Earth to find a new home. Zarda chose to remain behind as their sole emissary to the Earth, a role she had assumed some years earlier as Power Princess. During this time, she was a member of the World War II team known as the Golden Agency, along with fellow members American Eagle and Professor Imam, the Sorcerer Supreme of the Squadron's Earth.

Living in Capitol City, she became the common-law wife of Howard Shelton, a sailor whom she met during "the war". Howard was the sole survivor of a sinking ship and the first outsider Zarda met. Howard aged normally while Zarda appears to be the same age as she was when they met, 50–60 years earlier.

As a member of the Squadron Supreme, Zarda became brainwashed by the Overmind. To prevent such a thing from happening again, she and the Squadron assume control of the government of the United States. For a time, the Hyperion of Earth-616 masquerades as his Squadron Supreme counterpart and developed an attraction to Zarda. Disgusted that she was already committed to the elderly Shelton, the villainous Hyperion kills Shelton and began romancing Zarda. Upon the return of the Earth-712 Hyperion, the truth is revealed and the impostor is destroyed. Although initially confused about her feelings for her teammate, Zarda and Hyperion eventually began a romantic relationship. Zarda then assumed leadership of the Squadron. Defending the Earth-712 against an attack by the Nth Man, Power Princess and the Squadron Supreme were stranded on Earth-616.

Some time later, with the help of the Avengers, the Squadron Supreme return to Earth-712. On arrival, they find a regime has taken over the world in their absence, and they have become fugitives. With the Exiles' assistance, the Squadron expose the corrupt government.

Eventually, Earth-712 is destroyed by an Incursion, two realities colliding into one another. Zarda is the last survivor of her universe, escaping via an interdimensional portal. However, in transit she is attacked by an alternate version of herself called Warrior Woman, who drains Zarda of her energy and powers and leaves her for dead. Zarda survives, landing on Earth-616, and dedicates herself to stopping her evil duplicate.

=== Supreme Power ===
This Zarda debuted in Supreme Power #2. Apparently a Greek goddess who slept in a mausoleum for millennia, at one point she wakes up and finds the injured Hyperion, healing him. She claims to be an alien who was given a mission to colonize and conquer Earth.

After separating, Zarda goes on a rampage, disregarding human life and private property. She attempts to remove Doctor Spectrum's power prism but the crystal's intellect contacted her. It informed her that she is "broken" in some way (apparently referring to her seeming insanity) and that it cannot fix her. Zarda kills a woman and steals her identification in hopes of starting anew, taking the identity of Claire Debussy.

Zarda, along with the rest of her universe's squadron, is killed by the forces of the Cabal during an Incursion. During the Secret Wars storyline, Zarda is shown to live in the Supremia Province in Battleworld. She is later killed during a battle with Squadron Sinister of Utopolis during an invasion of Supremia.

=== Squadron Supreme of America ===
A variation of the Zarda Shelton version of Power Princess appears as a member of the Squadron Supreme of America. This version is a simulacrum created by Mephisto and programmed by the Power Elite. Power Princess was programmed to be a lustful power woman from Utopia Isle who wore a special necklace to dampen her powers when in her secret identity as a professional boxer.

== Powers and abilities ==
=== Squadron Supreme ===
Zarda possesses superhuman strength, agility, speed, reflexes, and has the ability to fly. Her aging process is extremely slowed, although she stated that she does not age at all in the Exiles series. She is able to drain the life force of others.

Zarda carries a transparent shield of Utopian design that can block tank shells and be used to redirect energy, and which she can throw so that its edges are able to slice through metal.

Power Princess has extensive experience in hand-to-hand combat (according to her, she has over five centuries of combat experience) and is skilled in discus throwing. She has undergone advanced graduate level studies in both Utopia Isle and Cosmopolis.

=== Supreme Power ===
In addition to similar physical abilities she shares with Hyperion, such as supersonic flight, super-strength, greatly enhanced reflexes, superhuman senses and nigh-invulnerability, this Zarda can drain the life-force of others to rejuvenate herself. She uses a similar life force transfer to heal Hyperion when he receives life-threatening injuries. While it is possible to hurt her, she apparently even survived a direct nuclear explosion through a combination of her nigh-invulnerability and her life-force transference capabilities. Like Hyperion, she is able to survive the vacuum of space unaided for a considerable amount of time, enabling at least interplanetary travel via her flight capabilities.

== Reception ==
=== Accolades ===
- In 2017, Comic Book Resources (CBR) ranked Power Princes 8th in their "15 Fiercest Warrior Women In Comics" list.
- In 2019, CBR ranked Power Princess 3rd in their "10 Most Powerful Members Of The Squadron Supreme" list.
- In 2020, CBR ranked Power Princess 5th in their "Marvel: 5 Strongest (& 5 Weakest) Members Of Squadron Supreme" list.
- In 2021, Screen Rant ranked Power Princess in their "10 Most Powerful Members Of The Squadron Supreme" list.

== Other versions ==
A version of Zarda called Warrior Woman appears in the 2015 Squadron Sinister miniseries, and later joins the Earth-616 iteration of the Squadron Supreme posing as the Earth-712 version of the character.

== In other media ==
- Power Princess appears in The Super Hero Squad Show episode "Whom Continuity Would Destroy!", voiced by Susan Eisenberg. This version possesses telekinesis and has a variety of invisible items such as an "invisible steamroller" and "invisible gyrocopter" in addition to her invisible shield.
- Zarda appears in Avengers Assemble, voiced by April Stewart. This version is an alien who joined the Squadron Supreme in destroying their home planet before coming to Earth.
