= Overmind =

Overmind may refer to:

== In science fiction ==
- Overmind, an interstellar hive mind that dominates the Milky Way Galaxy in the novel Childhood's End by Arthur C. Clarke
- Zerg Overmind, one of the antagonists in the StarCraft series
- Overmind (comics), a supervillain in the world of Marvel Comics
- Overmind, a group of three powerful aliens in the Sonic Chronicles: The Dark Brotherhood video game
- Overmind, a villainous artificial intelligence in the GURPS Reign of Steel roleplaying setting

== In transpersonal psychology ==
- Overmind, a concept in Sri Aurobindo's Integral psychology
- Overmind, the highest level of consciousness in the eight-circuit model of consciousness

== See also ==
- Group mind (science fiction)
