= Whizzer (Marvel Comics) =

- The Whizzer and the Squadron Supreme as depicted on the cover of Avengers (vol. 3) #5 (June 1998). Art by George Pérez.

Publication information
- Publisher: Marvel Comics
- First appearance: Frank: USA Comics #1 (Aug. 1941); Sanders: The Avengers #69 (Oct. 1969); Stewart: The Avengers #85 (Mar. 1971)
- Created by: Frank: Al Avison (penciller; writer unknown); Sanders and Stewart: Roy Thomas and John Buscema

In-story information
- Alter ego: Robert Frank; James Sanders; Stanley Stewart
- Species: Human mutate
- Team affiliations: Squadron Supreme
- Abilities: Superhuman speed

Whizzer is the name of several characters appearing in American comic books published by Marvel Comics. The first character debuted during the Golden Age in USA Comics #1 (Aug. 1941), and was reintroduced in Giant-Size Avengers #1 (Aug. 1974). A second villainous version debuts during the Silver Age in The Avengers #69 (Oct. 1969), and a second heroic version debuting in The Avengers #85 (Feb. 1971).

The Whizzer appeared in the second season of the Marvel Cinematic Universe television series Jessica Jones, portrayed by Jay Klaitz.

== Publication history ==
The first character named the Whizzer first appeared during the Golden Age of comics, and later appeared briefly during the Silver Age.

The second, villainous version appears in the final panel of The Avengers #69 (Oct. 1969), the first chapter of a three-issue storyline by writer Roy Thomas and penciller Sal Buscema. The story arc introduced the supervillain team the Squadron Sinister, whose four members were loosely based on heroes in DC Comics' Justice League of America, with the Whizzer based on the Flash.

== Fictional character biographies ==
=== Silver Age ===
The Squadron Sinister are created by the cosmic entity the Grandmaster to battle the Avengers, who are the champions of the time-traveling Kang the Conqueror. The Avengers eventually defeat the Squadron, who are abandoned by the Grandmaster.

The Squadron reappear in the title The Defenders, where they are reunited by the alien Nebulon. The villains receive greater power in exchange for the planet Earth, and create a giant laser cannon in the Arctic to melt the polar ice caps, thereby covering Earth in water. The Defenders prevent the scheme and defeat the villains and Nebulon.

Whizzer and his two remaining teammates are teleported off world by Nebulon, returning with an energy-draining weapon. The Squadron Sinister plan to threaten the Earth again, but are thwarted by the Defenders and the Avenger Yellowjacket. The Whizzer separates from the Squadron Sinister and adopts a new costume and alias, Speed Demon.

=== Bronze Age ===
Roy Thomas and penciller John Buscema created an alternate-universe team of heroes called the Squadron Supreme, who debut in Avengers #85 (Feb. 1971). After an initial skirmish with four Avengers, the teams unite to stop a common threat. The Squadron Supreme's version of Whizzer is Stanley Stewart, who gained superpowers from the mutagenic effects of a fogbank of unknown nature.

Whizzer and the Squadron Supreme starred in a self-titled 12-issue miniseries (Sept. 1985 – Aug. 1986) by writer Mark Gruenwald. The series explains that Grandmaster deliberately modeled the Squadron Sinister after the preexisting Squadron Supreme of Earth-712. Gruenwald, Ryan, and inker Al Williamson created a graphic-novel sequel, which stranded the team in the mainstream Marvel universe. The Squadron Supreme encounter the hero Quasar, and relocate to the government facility Project Pegasus. The Squadron Supreme appeared in a two-part story with the Avengers that returns them to their home universe.

=== Modern Age ===
The Atlanta Blur from Supreme Power #5. Art by Dan Buckley.

The mature-audience Marvel MAX imprint showcases the adventures of the Earth-31916 version of the Whizzer, the Atlanta Blur. Also named Stanley Stewart, the character is a young African-American man who develops super-speed as a result of exposure to an alien retrovirus. He initially hides his ability, with the "Atlanta Blur" regarded as an urban legend. When Hyperion is publicly revealed, Stewart also goes public, becoming a celebrity with numerous endorsements. As the Blur, he reluctantly fights crime at the request of Nighthawk.

=== Squadron Supreme of America ===
A variation of the Stanley Stewart version of Blur appears as a member of the Squadron Supreme of America. This version is a simulacrum created by Mephisto and programmed by the Power Elite. Stewart was programmed to forcefully watch endless loops to keep up his brain speed while watching numerous S.H.I.E.L.D. files and unscrupulous videos. As a civilian, Stewart works as a computer programmer in Washington D.C.

== Powers and abilities ==
Each of the Whizzers possess superhuman speed.

== In other media ==
- The Robert Frank incarnation of the Whizzer appears in the Spider-Man: The Animated Series five-part episode "Six Forgotten Warriors", voiced by Walker Edmiston.
- The Robert Frank incarnation of the Whizzer appears in the Ultimate Spider-Man episode "S.H.I.E.L.D. Academy", voiced by Robert Patrick.
- Speed Demon appears in Avengers Assemble, voiced by Jason Spisak.
- An original incarnation of the Whizzer named Robert Coleman appears in the second season of Jessica Jones, portrayed by Jay Klaitz. This version obtained superpowers after the biotech clinic IGH experimented on him. Coleman comes to Jessica Jones twice, claiming that someone is after him. When he returns a third time, Jones witnesses him using his powers as he rushes outside and is killed by falling debris.
