= Overmind (comics) =

Villain in the Marvel Comics universe

Publication information
- Publisher: Marvel Comics
- First appearance: Fantastic Four #113 (August 1971)
- Created by: Stan Lee (writer); John Buscema (artist)

In-story information
- Alter ego: Grom
- Team affiliations: Thunderbolts; Eternals the Psychics; Defenders
- Notable aliases: Champion of Champions
- Abilities: Transform psionic energy Superhuman strength

The Overmind (originally the Over-Mind) is a fictional character appearing in American comic books published by Marvel Comics.

== Publication history ==
The character first appeared in Fantastic Four #113 (Aug 1971).

== Fictional character biography ==
The Overmind is an alien belonging to the Eternals of Eyung. He was born uncounted millennia ago on the planet Eyung ("Eternus") as Grom. Acting as one of their warlords, he led massacres of entire species. He was also the reigning champion in their gladiatorial arenas. When his race had engaged the Gigantians in a war about to lead to mutual absolute destruction, Grom was chosen for his physical prowess as the receptacle for their entire population of several hundred million minds. He was launched in a protective capsule, unconscious for thousands of years while assimilating the minds into his own.

In the present day, the Overmind awakens and pilots his ship to the nearest inhabited planet, Earth, where he confronts the Fantastic Four. The Overmind takes over the mind of Mister Fantastic, then battles the Fantastic Four and Doctor Doom. The Stranger intervenes and shrinks the Overmind into the Microverse, where he is left isolated and goes mad from the strain.

The Overmind is found by Null the Living Darkness, who takes control of him and sends him on a campaign against a parallel universe home to the Squadron Supreme. The Overmind mentally enslaves the Squadron while posing as U.S. president Kyle Richmond and begins constructing an interstellar armada to invade other worlds. The Squadron are freed from the Overmind's control by Hyperion and the Defenders. A psychic composite entity of seven human telepaths empowered by the assembled heroes defeats the Overmind and inhabits his body.

After some time in the Defenders, the Overmind becomes uncomfortable and eventually leaves the group, making them forget that he was ever a member. He tried to find a purpose by attempting to help Millwood, New Hampshire, a town of 800 people dying of chemical poisoning, by controlling their minds to foster the illusion that they were well. The Overmind is convinced to cancel the illusion and allow them to live in reality.

The Overmind regains control of his body and captures the Squadron to take revenge against the Stranger by organizing a raid against the latter's laboratory world. He frees many of the Stranger's superhuman captives to fuel his enslaved ranks. He locked the Stranger in a stalemated mental battle. When several Watchers arrive on an unrelated business, the Overmind is wrought by paranoia, believing the Stranger to have summoned them for assistance. This allows the Stranger to capture the Overmind as a subject of study.

The Overmind is affected by Purple Man's mind-controlling pheromones and used to both monitor New York's population and control potential threats. The Overmind disappears after Purple Man is defeated. He is eventually located by Baron Zemo and the Thunderbolts and convinced to join the group as an alternative to imprisonment.

== Powers and abilities ==
The Overmind possesses vast psychic powers, including telepathy, telekinesis, or illusion-casting, and can use them over great distances. The Overmind can scan the thoughts of others and project his thoughts into others' minds, and control hundreds of people at once. He possesses psychokinetic abilities enabling him to lift psychokinetically approximately what he can physically lift. He can project psychokinetic concussion blasts capable of deforming steel at 10 feet (3.0 m).

As a result of his alien physiology and metabolism, he possesses enhanced strength, speed, stamina, and durability.

== Reception ==
- In 2021, CBR.com ranked the Over-Mind 14th in their "15 Most Powerful Eternals" list.
- In 2021, Screen Rant ranked the Over-Mind 9th in their "10 Most Powerful Members Of The Eternals" list
