= Squadron Supreme =

Group of fictional characters by Marvel Comics

- Squadron Supreme 1997 trade paperback cover. Art by Alex Ross.

Publication information
- Publisher: Marvel Comics
- First appearance: The Avengers #85 (Feb. 1971)
- Created by: Roy Thomas (writer); John Buscema (artist)

In-story information
- Base(s): Rocket Central; Squadron
- Member(s): Founding members: Amphibian; Doctor Spectrum; Hyperion; Nighthawk; Power Princess; Skrullian Skymaster; Whizzer; Later additions: Arcanna; Blue Eagle; Golden Archer; Lady Lark; Nuke; Tom Thumb

Roster

The Squadron Supreme is a superhero team appearing in American comic books published by Marvel Comics, of which there are several notable alternate versions. The original team was created by Roy Thomas and John Buscema, derived from the previously created supervillain team Squadron Sinister.

The core members of the Squadron Supreme are Hyperion, Nighthawk, Doctor Spectrum, Power Princess, and the Whizzer, pastiches of prominent members of rival publisher DC Comics' superhero team the Justice League. Many other characters were later added to the roster, not all of which were based on DC heroes.

== Publication history ==
The Squadron Supreme has its roots in the Squadron Sinister, which first appeared in The Avengers #69 as a pastiche of the Justice League. Roy Thomas later introduced a heroic version of the Squadron Sinister named the Squadron Supreme, which first appeared in The Avengers #85–86 (Feb.–March 1971), and which was co-created with John Buscema. The team then had guest appearances on several more occasions, and in 1985 was featured in a self-titled twelve-issue limited series by Mark Gruenwald, followed in 1989 by a graphic novel sequel by Gruenwald, Ryan and inker Al Williamson, Squadron Supreme: Death of a Universe, in which the Nth Man serves as the main antagonist.

In 2003, a reimagined Squadron Supreme appeared in an ongoing series entitled Supreme Power, published under the mature-audience MAX imprint. This version was created by writer J. Michael Straczynski and artist Gary Frank.

Yet another Squadron Supreme was introduced in 2015, written by James Robinson and drawn by Leonard Kirk. Unlike the previous teams, which had appeared in alternate realities, this team was based in Marvel's main "Earth-616" reality, although the team members were from a variety of alternate universes that had been destroyed in the aftermath of the 2015 Secret Wars event.

Another version of the Squadron Supreme, set in the Marvel Universe, was introduced by Jason Aaron in The Avengers vol. 8. The Squadron, created by Mephisto and led by Phil Coulson, acts as the US government's sanctioned superhero team in place of the Avengers. This version of the team is the focus of the Heroes Reborn storyline, where reality is overwritten so that the Avengers were never formed and the Squadron Supreme are Earth's premier superhero team instead.

== Fictional history ==
=== Earth-712 version ===
The Squadron Supreme are first encountered by four members of the Avengers – Vision, Quicksilver, Scarlet Witch, and Goliath – who have arrived in the Earth-712 universe by mistake. The Avengers are initially confused, since several members of the Squadron Supreme have identical names and powers to the Squadron Sinister, a group of previously encountered villains. After a brief battle, the Avengers assist the Squadron Supreme against the global threat posed by the mutant Brain-Child, before returning to their own universe. The Squadron Supreme have another series of skirmishes with the Avengers engineered by the Serpent Cartel, but eventually they join forces and prevent the use of the Serpent Crown.

The Squadron Supreme were next featured in a self-titled 12-issue limited series (Sept. 1985–Aug. 1986) by writer Mark Gruenwald. The Squadron, led by Hyperion, believe they have the knowledge and power to recreate the world following a conflict with Overmind and Null the Living Darkness and create a utopia. Nighthawk protests, believing that the Squadron should serve and not rule. The issue is put to a vote, with the so-called "Utopia Program" favored by the majority of the Squadron; Nighthawk, unable to agree with the decision in clear conscience, resigns from the team. The Squadron assume overall control of the government of the United States and remake the nation into a virtual utopia. The team implement a series of sweeping changes, including revealing their secret identities; instituting a program of behavior modification in prisons where inmates are forced to submit to a process that mentally inhibits their criminal instincts; enforcing a strict gun control policy; and developing medical technology to cryogenically preserve the dead, while opposed by Victorex Prime.

Despite the economic and technological advances, there are setbacks: Golden Archer abuses the behavior modification technology by forcing fellow member Lady Lark to love him, resulting in his eventual removal from the team; Amphibian becomes increasingly disgusted with the Squadron's methods and abandons the surface world; Nuke inadvertently kills his parents with radiation and dies in a battle with Doctor Spectrum; and Tom Thumb dies from cancer.

In the meantime, Nighthawk forms a new team he calls the America Redeemers, recruiting former villains and several previously unknown superhumans. The later infiltrate the Squadron and kidnap the surviving Institute of Evil members to reverse the behavior modification they had been subjected to. Despite mixed feelings on the parts of several of the Institute members, they too join the Redeemers. Golden Archer (now known as the Black Archer) also joins. Eventually, the Redeemers confront the Squadron Supreme. A brutal battle ensues in which several members of both teams are killed, including Nighthawk. A horrified Hyperion realizes that Nighthawk was right: the Squadron, despite having good intentions, had inadvertently created a totalitarian state with themselves as its dictators. The Squadron surrenders, disbands and returns control of the United States to the government.

In a graphic novel sequel by Gruenwald, Ryan and inker Al Williamson, Squadron Supreme: Death of a Universe, remnants of the team and their former enemies (including Victorex Prime) reunite to battle the Nth Man. Although they succeed, several members of the Squadron are killed, with the remainder (Hyperion, Doctor Spectrum, the Whizzer, Power Princess, Lady Lark (now known as Skylark), Arcanna, Haywire, and Shape) stranded in the mainstream Marvel universe. The Squadron Supreme returns to their universe and attempts to allow society to progress without superhuman involvement.

=== Earth-31916 version ===
==== Supreme Power ====
The series Supreme Power features the rebooted version of the superhero team Squadron Supreme and is set on Earth-31916. In this version of events, Hyperion arrived on Earth as an infant and was taken into custody by the US government and raised in a controlled environment. Army Corporal Joseph Ledger bonds with a strange crystal from Hyperion's spaceship, rendering him comatose for years. Discovering Hyperion has superhuman abilities, the government uses him as a state-sponsored hero, which encourages other beings to appear, such as the Blur, who can move at superspeed. Ledger awakens and, harnessing the energy powers of the crystal, becomes Doctor Spectrum. Hyperion and Spectrum are initially hostile to one another and they battle, with Hyperion accessing lost memories when coming in contact with Spectrum's crystal. Amphibian is seen on dry land for the first time, and Princess Zarda heals Hyperion after his battle. Nighthawk solicits the aid of Hyperion and the Blur to deal with a superpowered serial killer, who Hyperion now knows is actually the product of experimentation with his DNA. Although successful, Hyperion is outraged by the government exploitation and leaves, warning that he has no wish to be contacted by humankind again. The government gathers the remaining superhumans into a team to capture Hyperion.

==== Ultimate Power ====
An unrelated nine-issue series, Ultimate Power, written by J. Michael Straczynski; Brian Michael Bendis and Jeph Loeb with art by Greg Land, features the Squadron in a crossover into the Ultimate Marvel universe. Courtesy of a deception engineered by Nick Fury and Doctor Doom, the Squadron travel to the Ultimate Universe, thinking that Reed Richards is responsible for releasing an organism that has destroyed much of the United States.

A series of misunderstandings ensues, and after a series of battles between the Squadron, the Fantastic Four, the Ultimates and the Earth-712 Squadron Supreme (whose world was also affected by the organism), the third culprit is revealed as Emil Burbank, who was asked by the government to develop a weapon to kill Hyperion. Nick Fury is detained in custody in the Earth-31916 universe, while Squadron member Power Princess remains in the Ultimate Universe to ensure that Doom is captured.

==== Squadron Supreme: Hyperion vs. Nighthawk ====
An unrelated four-issue limited series, Squadron Supreme: Hyperion vs. Nighthawk, written by Marc Guggenheim and with art by Paul Gulacy, relates how Hyperion and Nighthawk, after an initial skirmish, join forces to try to alleviate the Darfur conflict in Sudan. Hyperion discovers Nighthawk has a prototype weapon built from stolen plans of Emil Burbank's journal that cannot actually injure him, but can convince him that he is being injured.

==== Third Squadron Supreme title ====
A third volume of the title Squadron Supreme, written by Howard Chaykin and with art by Greg Land (and other artists), is published, with the 12-issue series being set five years after the battle with Redstone. Most of the Squadron have disappeared, with Ultimate Nick Fury, Burbank and Arcanna now a team of intelligence officers working for the government and investigating a group of returning astronauts that exhibit strange abilities. The astronauts infect many people they come into contact with, also giving them superhuman abilities.

==== Later appearances ====
Later, the members of the Squadron Supreme are apparently killed by Namor and the Cabal after the villains raid the Squadron's universe. Versions resembling these characters later appear on Battleworld during the Secret Wars event, only to be killed by the Squadron Sinister. Nighthawk is left the sole survivor.

=== Earth-616 version ===
This team, set in Marvel's mainstream reality, features characters from numerous alternate universes, such as the Nighthawk from Supreme Power, a Hyperion from a reality that had been destroyed upon colliding with another universe, Doctor Spectrum from the world of the Great Society (which was destroyed by Namor to prevent it from colliding with the mainstream universe), the Blur from the New Universe, and Warrior Woman (a counterpart of Power Princess posing as her Earth-712 counterpart).

Through Modred the Mystic's magical modifications to Reed Richard's time machine, Hyperion and Doctor Spectrum are accidentally transformed into ephemeral "ghosts" caught in the past; specifically during the Squadron's attack on Atlantis and just before Hyperion kills Namor. They decide to change the past by dragging this past Namor back to the present, thereby resurrecting him. Although this action is easy for Hyperion, who has had second thoughts about the cutthroat methods the Squadron Supreme has been using, it is more difficult for Doctor Spectrum, as Namor destroyed her Earth. Hyperion leads the action to disband the Squadron, and the team goes their separate ways.

=== Squadron Supreme of America ===
When the Avengers become a global peacekeeping force, Thunderbolt Ross meets with Phil Coulson to discuss the matter. Phil reveals that he has established the Squadron Supreme of America as the newest United States superhero team. The team consists of Hyperion, Power Princess, Nighthawk, the Blur, and Doctor Spectrum as their leader. During The War of the Realms storyline, the Squadron Supreme of America are revealed to be simulacrums created by Mephisto and programmed by the Power Elite to act as superheroes.

During the Heroes Reborn storyline, reality is changed so that the Squadron Supreme of America are the America's premier superhero team and the Avengers never existed. The Avengers battle and eventually defeat the Squadron Supreme of America. After Captain America, Star Brand, and Echo use the Pandemonium Cube to restore the original reality, the Squadron Supreme of America find their memories transferred to their counterparts in the Avengers' reality and struggle to find their place in an unfamiliar world.

== Other versions ==
Clones of the Squadron Supreme appear in the 2011 Marvel Zombies Supreme miniseries, which sees the members of the team infected with a zombie virus developed by a deranged geneticist.

== In other media ==
- The Squadron Supreme appears in The Super Hero Squad Show episode "Whom Continuity Would Destroy!", consisting of Nighthawk, Power Princess, and Hyperion.
- The Squadron Supreme appears in Avengers Assemble, consisting of Hyperion, Zarda, Nighthawk, Speed Demon, Doctor Spectrum, and Nuke. This version of the group are aliens who ruled over their home planet before destroying it when the populace failed to blindly obey them.

== Collected editions ==
=== Earth-712 ===
| Title | Material collected | Year | ISBN |
|---|---|---|---|
| Squadron Supreme | Squadron Supreme (vol. 1) #1–12 | 1997 | ISBN 078510576X |
| Squadron Supreme: Death of a Universe | OGN | 1989 | ISBN 0871355981 |
| Squadron Supreme: Death of a Universe | Squadron Supreme: Death of a Universe, Thor (vol. 1) #280, Avengers (vol. 3) #5–6, Avengers/Squadron Supreme Annual '98, Squadron Supreme: New World Order | 2006 | ISBN 0785120912 |
| Squadron Supreme Omnibus | Squadron Supreme (vol. 1) #1–12, Captain America (vol. 1) #314, Squadron Supreme: Death of a Universe | 2011 | ISBN 9780785149712 |
| Squadron Supreme vs. Avengers | Avengers (vol. 1) #69-70, 85-86, 141-144, 147-149; Thor (vol. 1) #280; Avengers (vol. 3) #5-6; Avengers/Squadron Supreme Annual '98; Squadron Supreme (vol. 4) #3 | 2021 | ISBN 9781302930868 |
| Squadron Supreme Classic Omnibus | Avengers (vol. 1) #69–70, 85–86, 141–144, 147–149, Thor (vol. 1) #280, Defenders (vol. 1) #112–114, Squadron Supreme (vol. 1) #1–12, Captain America (vol. 1) #314, Squadron Supreme: Death Of A Universe, Quasar (vol. 1) #13–16, 51–52, Avengers (vol. 3) #5–6, Avengers/Squadron Supreme Annual '98, Squadron Supreme: New World Order, Exiles (vol. 1) #77–78, Ultimate Power #7–9 | 2016 | ISBN 9781302900656 |

=== Earth-31916 ===
| Title | Material collected | Year | ISBN |
|---|---|---|---|
| Supreme Power: Contact | Supreme Power #1-6 | 2003 | ISBN 0785112243 |
| Supreme Power: Powers and Principalities | Supreme Power #7-12 | 2004 | ISBN 0-7851-1456-4 |
| Supreme Power: High Command | Supreme Power #13-18 | 2005 | ISBN 0785114742 |
| Supreme Power Vol. 1 | Supreme Power #1-12; Avengers (vol.1) #85-86 | 2005 | ISBN 078511369X |
| Supreme Power Vol. 2 | Supreme Power #13-18; Supreme Power: Hyperion #1–5 | 2006 | ISBN 0785121331 |
| Doctor Spectrum | Doctor Spectrum #1–6 | 2005 | ISBN 0-7851-1586-2 |
| Supreme Power: Nighthawk | Supreme Power: Nighthawk #1–6 | 2006 | ISBN 0785118977 |
| Supreme Power: Hyperion | Supreme Power: Hyperion #1–5 | 2006 | ISBN 0785118950 |
| Squadron Supreme: Pre-War Years | Squadron Supreme (vol. 2) #1-7 | 2006 | ISBN 0785122826 |
| Squadron Supreme: Hyperion vs. Nighthawk | Squadron Supreme: Hyperion vs. Nighthawk #1–4 | 2007 | ISBN 0785124349 |
| Ultimate Power | Ultimate Power #1-9 | 2008 | ISBN 9780785123675 |
| Squadron Supreme Vol. 1: Power to the People | Squadron Supreme (vol.3) #1-6 | 2008 | ISBN 9780785132844 |
| Squadron Supreme Vol. 2: Bright Shining Lies | Squadron Supreme (vol. 3) #7-12 | 2008 | ISBN 9780785135364 |
| Supreme Power: Gods and Soldiers | Supreme Power (vol. 2) #1–4 | 2011 | ISBN 9780785155713 |

=== Earth-616 ===
| Title | Material collected | Year | ISBN |
|---|---|---|---|
| Squadron Supreme Vol. 1: By Any Means Necessary! | Squadron Supreme (vol. 4) #1–5 and material from Avengers (vol. 5) #0 | 2016 | ISBN 9780785199717 |
| Squadron Supreme Vol. 2: Civil War II | Squadron Supreme (vol. 4) #6–9 | 2016 | ISBN 9780785199724 |
| Squadron Supreme Vol. 3: Finding Namor | Squadron Supreme (vol. 4) #10–15 | 2017 | ISBN 9781302902858 |
