= Hyperion (character) =

Marvel Comics character

Publication information
- Publisher: Marvel Comics
- First appearance: Zhib-Ran: The Avengers #69 (October 1969); Mark Milton: The Avengers #85 (February 1971); Squadron Supreme's Mark Milton: Supreme Power #1 (October 2003) (Marcus Milton): Avengers vol. 5 #1 (December 2012)
- Created by: Roy Thomas (writer); Sal Buscema (artist); Squadron member only: John Buscema (artist)

In-story information
- Alter ego: Zhib-Ran; Mark Milton; Marcus Milton
- Species: Eternal
- Team affiliations: (Zhib-Ran); Squadron Sinister (Mark Milton); Squadron Supreme; Thunderbolts (Marcus Milton); Avengers; Squadron Supreme
- Abilities: (All): Superhuman strength, speed, stamina, durability, reflexes, agility, and senses; Heat vision; Flight; (Earth-712): Regeneration; Atomic vision; Longevity

Hyperion is a superhero appearing in American comic books published by Marvel Comics, of which there are several notable versions. Created by writer Roy Thomas and artist Sal Buscema, the original Hyperion made his debut in The Avengers #69 (October 1969). The alternate versions are each from a different dimension of the Marvel Multiverse, and consist of both heroes and villains. Thomas says that the character was intended as a pastiche of DC's iconic hero Superman.

The first Hyperion, Zhib-Ran, was a member of Squadron Sinister, a team that the Grandmaster created to fight against a team of Avengers gathered by the time travelling Kang. Two years after the character's first appearance, a heroic version appeared as one of the founding members of the alternate-reality Squadron Supreme. This incarnation of the character was a major character in the 1985 series Squadron Supreme, which fleshed out the characterization of Hyperion and the other Squadron Supreme members. In 2003, Marvel Comics launched Supreme Power, a new take on the Squadron Supreme universe, where Hyperion is raised by the United States government to be a super-powered operative. Yet another alternate Hyperion joined the Avengers and later the Squadron Supreme from Earth-616.

== Creation ==
Thomas spoke in depth on the character's creation stating, "The first of the 4 members of the Squadron Sinister I designed for THE AVENGERS, to be an evil counterpart of Superman, kind of a parody/homage. I took the name from the Greek sun god, by way of the Shakespearean quote from Hamlet: "...that was to this, Hyperion to a satyr." I made sure that every costume line on Hyperion was different from those on Superman... boots, belt, length of sleeves, face mask, etc. And I gave him a cape that only attached to one shoulder, after the look of a 1940s character called Dyna-Man in a Harry Chesler comic."

== Publication history ==
The first iteration of Hyperion, created by Roy Thomas and Sal Buscema, debuted in The Avengers #69 as a member of the Squadron Sinister.

Two years later, Thomas and penciller John Buscema created an alternate, heroic version of the Squadron Sinister called the Squadron Supreme, once again in the title The Avengers, using characters with the same names as those of the Squadron Sinister (this caused confusion in Marvel's production department, as the covers of The Avengers #85 and #141 claimed the issues featured appearances by the Squadron Sinister when it was in fact the Squadron Supreme that appeared in both issues). In the 12-issue Squadron Supreme limited series (Sept. 1985-Aug. 1986) Mark Gruenwald picked up from where Earth-712 was last seen in The Defenders #114 and revealed this Hyperion's origins.

The character is re-imagined for Marvel's MAX imprint title Supreme Power, where he is an alien who has been raised by the government. This iteration received a spinoff miniseries, Supreme Power: Hyperion, which showed a dystopian possible future.

Another Hyperion joins the Avengers in Jonathan Hickman's The Avengers vol. 5 #1 (Dec. 2012). Hickman described the decision to use a new Hyperion, rather than an existing one:

This is yet another parallel universe Hyperion. This is not King Hyperion, or Supreme Power Hyperion, this is not Gruenwald's Hyperion. This is Hyperion without all that baggage. This is Hyperion with a fresh slate, for a very specific purpose. He comes out of what the big story is behind the whole Avengers three-year plan that I have. He's very important, very pivotal, and I think people are really going to dig where we go with that. He's not going to be our poor analogue for Superman.

A pastiche of Hyperion, "Hyperius", appears in DC Comics' Final Crisis and The Multiversity, part of a group of recursive homages to other companies' pastiches of DC characters.

== Fictional character biography ==
=== Squadron Sinister ===
Hyperion (Zhib-Ran) and the Squadron Sinister are assembled by the Grandmaster to battle the champions of Kang the Conqueror. The Avengers defeat the Squadron and the Grandmaster, with Thor trapping Hyperion in a glass sphere. The Squadron reappears in Defenders, where its members are reunited by Nebulon.

Hyperion later battles Thor once again and encounters his Earth-712 counterpart. He becomes involved with Thundra, but the relationship ends when she returns to her own dimension. The Earth-712 Master Menace transports Hyperion to his universe and informs him that he is a clone created by the Grandmaster. The Squadron Sinister Hyperion impersonates the Squadron Supreme Hyperion, who later kills him. The Grandmaster briefly resurrects Hyperion as part of the Legion of the Unliving to combat the Avengers.

=== Squadron Supreme (Earth-712) ===
Hyperion, also known as Mark Milton, is a founding member of his reality's Squadron Supreme and the last known Eternal on his Earth. Following the societal instability caused by Overmind's takeover of Earth, Hyperion and the Squadron assume control of the United States government.

Hyperion becomes trapped in an inter-dimensional zone and is impersonated by the Squadron Sinister Hyperion (Zhib-Ran). Hyperion defeats Zhib-Ran, but is blinded in the fight. After a battle to the death with Nighthawk and the Redeemers, Hyperion relents and relinquishes power.

Hyperion and the members of the Squadron Supreme are exiled to Earth-616. The team encounters the hero Quasar and take up residence at Project Pegasus, where Makkari restores his sight. The Squadron members later return to their universe, where they overthrow a corrupt government that replaced them in their absence.

During the "Civil War II" event, Hyperion is killed when Earth-712 is destroyed in an Incursion, a collision with another universe.

=== King Hyperion (Earth-4023) ===
Hyperion decided to take over his earth, defeating every superpowered being and military of his planet. This ultimately resulted in nuclear annihilation.

He was later transported to Earth-616, briefly becoming a member of the Thunderbolts before being killed while betraying them.

=== Supreme Power ===
This Hyperion was sent to Earth in a spacecraft, and seized shortly after by U.S. government agents who raised him in a tightly controlled, isolated environment. As an adult, he became a covert agent used in strict secrecy, but eventually a reporter came too close to the truth, and the decision was made to make his existence public, largely so he could be used as a distraction from the government's even more closely guarded secret super-operative Joe Ledger. As Hyperion discovers that he has been systematically lied to his entire life, he becomes disillusioned with the government and eventually openly rebels.

In the Supreme Power: Hyperion miniseries, a hastily assembled team of superhumans is sent by the government to retrieve Hyperion. In the resulting battle, an interaction of Hyperion's "flash vision" eye-beams, Nuke's radiation blast, and Arcanna's reality manipulation sends the combatants to an alternate future where Hyperion and the Squadron Supreme rule a dystopian world. Hyperion rethinks his ideas about power, humanity, and teamwork, leading him to surrender to the Squadron from his world.

Along with the rest of his team, save Nighthawk, Hyperion is killed by the Cabal during an Incursion.

=== Squadron Supreme (Earth-616) ===
This Hyperion was sent to Earth as a baby, the only survivor of a race of Eternals from a dying world. He was raised by a man named "Father", who named him Marcus Milton and taught him the morals of society. As an adult, Milton becomes the superhero Hyperion and joins the Squadron Supreme. After his universe is destroyed in an Incursion, Hyperion is rescued by A.I.M. scientists and transported to Earth-616. Hyperion is held captive by A.I.M. until he is freed by the Avengers and joins their ranks.

=== Squadron Supreme of America ===
A variation of Hyperion appears as a member of the Squadron Supreme of America. This version is a simulacrum created by Mephisto who was programmed to possess the strength of an Eternal. As a civilian, he works as a history teacher at Buscema High School in Kensington, Maryland.

== Powers and abilities ==
Hyperion is a member of the race of superhumans known as the Eternals. As a result, he has superhuman strength, speed, stamina, durability, agility, reflexes, and flight. All versions of Hyperion possess these superhuman attributes, and, in a few cases, powerful breath able to generate force winds and freezing cold. Each also has greatly enhanced sensory perceptions which extends to being able to perceive the entire electromagnetic spectrum. His "atomic vision" allows him to fire beams of heat from his eyes.

The Earth-712 incarnation of Hyperion can use cosmic energy to augment his life force, granting him longevity and regenerative abilities. The powers of Hyperion and his alternative versions are drained when exposed to argonite radiation.

== Reception ==
=== Accolades ===
- In 2015, Entertainment Weekly ranked Hyperion 72nd in their "Let's rank every Avenger ever" list.
- In 2017, Comic Book Resources (CBR) ranked Hyperion 5th in their "15 Most Overpowered Avengers" list.
- In 2018, CBR ranked Hyperion 7th in their "25 Most Powerful Avengers Ever" list and 14th in their "Marvel's 20 Strongest Villains" list.
- In 2019, CBR ranked Hyperion 7th in their "10 Best New Avengers Of The Decade" list.
- In 2021, CBR ranked Hyperion 5th in their "Marvel: The 10 Strongest Male Avengers" list and 5th in their "Marvel: 10 Fastest Villains In The Comics" list.
- In 2021, Screen Rant included Hyperion in their "10 Most Powerful Members Of The Squadron Supreme" list and in their "16 Most Powerful Cosmic Characters In Marvel Comics" list.
- In 2022, CBR ranked Hyperion 4th in their "10 Scariest Avengers" list and 7th in their "Strongest Fighters In The Avengers" list.

== Other versions ==
=== Exiles ===
King Hyperion is a member of the reality-hopping team Weapon X. He is incredibly ruthless and seeks to conquer alternate Earths, but is eventually defeated by Blink and an alternate version of Gambit. Although his body is blown to pieces, Hyperion survives, regenerating and eventually regaining his full power. He seeks revenge on the Exiles, only to be engaged in battle by two alternate versions of himself, including the Earth-712 version. King Hyperion is then exiled to his home reality, where Earth was completely destroyed by nuclear weapons in an attempt to destroy him years prior. He escapes, and is later seen in the mainstream Earth-616 reality's Russia, battling the Winter Guard and Blue Marvel. Luke Cage later recruits Hyperion into the Thunderbolts, who he betrays.

=== Secret Wars ===
An alternate universe version of Hyperion from Earth-21195 appears in the Secret Wars tie-in Squadron Sinister. This version is a conqueror on Battleworld. Nighthawk secretly works against Hyperion and later kills him after weakening him with argonite.

== In other media ==
=== Television ===
- Hyperion appears in The Super Hero Squad Show episode "Whom Continuity Would Destroy!", voiced by Travis Willingham.
- Hyperion appears in Avengers Assemble, voiced by Brian Bloom. This version is an alien and member of the Squadron Supreme, who thought the only way to bring peace was to rule over their people like tyrants and destroyed their own planet when the population refused to blindly obey them. Hyperion initially appears as a member of the Red Skull's Cabal until he betrays them.

=== Video games ===
- Hyperion appears as an unlockable character in Marvel: Avengers Alliance.
- Hyperion appears as an unlockable character in Marvel: Future Fight.
- Hyperion appears as a playable DLC character in Lego Marvel's Avengers.
- Hyperion appears as a playable character in Marvel: Contest of Champions. Additionally, Gwenperion, an alternate universe variant of Gwenpool who gained Hyperion's powers, appears as well.
