= Nighthawk (Marvel Comics) =

Marvel Comics superhero

Nighthawk is the name of several characters appearing in American comic books published by Marvel Comics. There have been several versions of the character: two supervillains-turned-superheroes from the mainstream Marvel Universe continuity (Earth-616), Kyle Richmond (who belonged to the Squadron Sinister) and Tilda Johnson (the former Deadly Nightshade); two S.H.I.E.L.D. agents, Jackson Norriss and Joaquin Pennyworth; five from alternate universes, who belonged to various incarnations of the Squadron Supreme, including Kyle and Neal Richmond of Earth-712, and an African-American version of Richmond from Earth-31916 who primarily kills white supremacists and mentors Tilda upon traveling to Earth-616; and a simulacrum of Richmond created by Mephisto and programmed by the Power Elite to serve as a member of the Squadron Supreme of America under the command of Phil Coulson.

In the Marvel Cinematic Universe (MCU), Scoot McNairy plays a similar character, Jackson Norriss, in the live-action short film All Hail the King (2014), with A. J. Bowen playing the real Norris in the web series WHIH Newsfront (2016).

== Publication history ==
Kyle Richmond, the original Nighthawk, debuted as a supervillain in the final panel of The Avengers #69 (October 1969). This story is the first chapter of a three-issue story arc by writer Roy Thomas and penciller Sal Buscema. The arc introduced the supervillain team the Squadron Sinister, whose four members were loosely based on heroes in DC Comics' Justice League of America, with Nighthawk based on Batman.

Following this arc, Nighthawk pursues a solo career, next appearing in Daredevil #62 (March 1970). Here, Richmond attempts through underhanded means to tarnish DD's reputation and supplant him. Daredevil tricks Richmond into revealing his criminal activities to the public and, after a battle atop a subway, Nighthawk makes good his escape.

Nighthawk next appears in the superhero team title The Defenders #13–14 (May–July 1974), he goes to the titular supergroup for help against his former teammates, and joins the team the following issue. Defenders writer Len Wein said that adding Nighthawk to the group "gave me a character to play with who didn't have a whole lot of previous history ... [a] character I could do anything I wanted to without worrying about how it would affect any other titles that character might appear in."

Nighthawk appeared on a regular basis in The Defenders and a number of other Marvel titles. A long-range story arc in The Defenders, beginning in 1979, has Nighthawk under criminal investigation. Writer Ed Hannigan later revealed he planned to end this story arc with Nighthawk being put in prison "for good", but his run on the series ended before he could bring this to fruition.

Defenders writer David Anthony Kraft said, describing Nighthawk's role in the team, "Nighthawk so desperately wanted to be the leader. He would be telling everyone what to do, but no one would listen to him! He may be wealthy and can buy all these toys, but he still gets no respect!"

Nighthawk apparently sacrifices his life in The Defenders #106 (cover dated April 1982). The supervillain Dead Ringer impersonates him in Captain America #429 (July 1994). In the three-issue miniseries Nighthawk (September–November 1998) Richmond is revealed to be alive, but in a coma and brain dead. Through supernatural means, he is revived and resumes his crime-fighting career. He co-starred in the 12-issue run of The Defenders vol. 2 (March 2001–February 2002) and the miniseries The Order #1-6 (April–September 2002). Nighthawk formed a short-lived version of the Defenders, with Colossus, the Blazing Skull, and She-Hulk, as part of the Initiative, depicted in the miniseries The Last Defenders #1–6 (May–October 2008).

== Fictional character biography ==
=== Kyle Richmond ===
Nighthawk
- Nighthawk #1 (September 1998), featuring Nighthawk in various costumes. Art by Richard Case.

Publication information
- Publisher: Marvel Comics
- First appearance: The Avengers #69 (October 1969)
- Created by: Roy Thomas; Sal Buscema

In-story information
- Alter ego: Kyle Richmond
- Species: Human mutate
- Team affiliations: Squadron Sinister; Defenders; Thunderbolts; Legion of the Unliving; Fearsome Four
- Abilities: Superb athlete; Mild superhuman strength; Enhanced agility and durability from dusk till dawn; Jet-powered artificial wing system; Artificial claw tips; Use of lasers and projectile weapons

Kyle Richmond was born to two wealthy parents and was brought up by his governess while his father is away. When Kyle's mother dies in an accident, his father sent him to boarding school. Due to his family's money, Kyle enrolls in Grayburn College, where he became involved with Mindy Williams. One night, Kyle is caught in a drunk-driving crash in which Mindy was killed, and he is kicked out of school. Kyle attempts to join the army, but is rejected due to a heart murmur. Afterwards, Kyle is told that his father died in a plane crash and that he has inherited Richmond Enterprises. Kyle turns to finding a cure for his heart murmur and physically training himself.

While drunk, Kyle Richmond creates an alchemy serum that gives him enhanced strength at night. Kyle took on various sports activities to strengthen his natural abilities where he eventually became Nighthawk. Nighthawk and three other supervillains are brought together as the Squadron Sinister by the Grandmaster to battle the Avengers, which has been forced to act as the champions of Kang the Conqueror. Nighthawk battles the Avenger Captain America, who outfights the villain. The Avengers eventually defeat the Squadron.

The character suffers several setbacks as a superhero, including being charged with tax evasion and fraud by the government. This stipulation was waived after he was forced to reveal his secret identity. Nighthawk's cumulative wounds from battle eventually leave him paralyzed. Recovering to the point that he can move at night, Nighthawk continues to aid the Defenders, until resigning from the team. He is advised he is to be cleared of all charges if a predetermined amount is repaid to the government.

After apparently sacrificing his life to stop an organization bent on decimating the people of the Soviet Union, Richmond turns up alive but comatose. He has a vision of an angel that facilitates his healing and bestows on him a "second sight", which enables him to see criminal acts before they are committed. Richmond becomes Nighthawk once again and fights crime until forced into a confrontation with Daredevil, whom he kills. The "angel" reveals itself to be the demon Mephisto, who transports Nighthawk and Daredevil's corpse to Hell, intending to claim Daredevil's soul. Nighthawk battles demons and manages to revive Daredevil, and together they escape. A sorcerer later purges him of Mephisto's gift.

After encountering teammate Hyperion, apparently resurrected after being thought dead, and a new Doctor Spectrum (Alice Nugent), Nighthawk briefly joins the New Thunderbolts. Upon discovering he is being used for his fortune, Nighthawk leaves the group and rejoins the Squadron Sinister.

=== Jackson F. "Jack" Norriss ===
Nighthawk

Publication information
- Publisher: Marvel Comics
- First appearance: The Incredible Hulk #126 (January 1970)
- Created by: Roy Thomas; Herb Trimpe

In-story information
- Alter ego: Jackson F. Norriss
- Species: Human
- Team affiliations: S.H.I.E.L.D.

Jackson F. "Jack" Norriss and his wife Barbara worked with the original Nighthawk and the Defenders. Norriss later becomes a S.H.I.E.L.D. file-clerk, and then an agent of S.H.I.E.L.D., often going by the codename Nighthawk.

=== Joaquin Pennyworth ===
Nighthawk

Publication information
- Publisher: Marvel Comics
- First appearance: The Last Defenders #1 (May 2008)
- Created by: Joe Casey; Keith Giffen; Jim Muniz

In-story information
- Alter ego: Joaquin Pennysworth
- Species: Human
- Team affiliations: Defenders
- Abilities: Highly trained agent; Olympic-level athlete; Wears special high tech suit

After Richmond joins the US government's Fifty State Initiative of registered heroes as Nighthawk, he forms a short-lived Initiative version of the Defenders with Colossus, the Blazing Skull, and She-Hulk. With She-Hulk and Warlord Krang, battling the group the Sons of the Serpent and culminating in a confrontation with his old Defenders foe Yandroth, Yandroth manipulates time and forces Nighthawk to battle a twisted version of his old team, the Squadron Sinister, before being rescued by a future incarnation of the Defenders. Noting that one of the future members is Joaquin Pennyworth, an agent of S.H.I.E.L.D. and the son of the one-time leader of the Sons of the Serpent, Richmond asks him to commence training to become the new Nighthawk, before retiring.

=== Squadron Supreme of America version ===
A new version of Kyle Richmond is a member of the Squadron Supreme of America. He is revealed to be a simulacrum created by Mephisto and programmed by the Power Elite to obey Phil Coulson. As a civilian, Richmond is a U.S. congressman elected to the House of Representatives to represent Washington, D.C..

During The War of the Realms storyline, Richmond is at a congressional hearing when a code red was issued that sent the representatives to the tunnels below. He and the other members of the Squadron Supreme of America are summoned to Washington D.C., where Coulson brought them up to speed with Malekith the Accursed's invasion. Nighthawk and the Squadron Supreme of America fight an army of Rock Trolls and Frost Giants. After the Squadron Supreme cause the Frost Giants to retreat, Coulson sends the group to Ohio, which has become a battleground.

After leaving the Squadron Supreme, Nighthawk discovers the room under the Pentagon where he and the Squadron were created, then burns it down. Nighthawk leaves the House of Representatives and becomes a vigilante, seeking to prove himself as a person. After encountering Mephisto, Nighthawk is convinced to join the Avengers to combat him.

=== Tilda Johnson ===
After meeting the Nighthawk of Earth-31916 and helping him defend Chicago from a group of white nationalists called the True Patriots, Tilda Johnson decides to reform her image from her time as the supervillain Nightshade. Sometime later, they help Hawkeye and Red Wolf after they find barrels of epidurium, a synthetic skin used in the construction of Life Model Decoys (LMDs), on a truck that was hijacked. They go to an abandoned coal factory where they end up being attacked by armed soldiers led by an LMD of Nick Fury. After defeating the group, Tilda decides to join Hawkeye and Red Wolf on the Avengers, saying her goodbyes to Nighthawk.

During the Secret Empire storyline, while Hawkeye joins the Underground resistance following Hydra's takeover in the United States, the rest of the team gather their own resistance army to help the people in rural areas who are being affected by Hydra's cruel treatment. Tilda Johnson is revealed to have become the new Nighthawk, after the Nighthawk of Earth-31916 was killed by Hydra soldiers.

== Powers and abilities ==
Nighthawk is a skilled athlete who, courtesy of an alchemical potion, possesses enhanced strength and increased agility and durability from dusk until dawn. He has also used several costume aids, such as a jet-powered artificial wing system, artificial claw tips, lasers and projectile weapons.

== Other versions ==
=== Kyle Richmond (Earth-712) ===
Roy Thomas and penciller John Buscema created an alternate-universe team of heroes called the Squadron Supreme, who debut in The Avengers #85 (February 1971). After an initial skirmish with four Avengers, the teams unite to stop a common threat. The characters (including Nighthawk) are identical in name and appearance to the Squadron Sinister.

Richmond later retires as Nighthawk, feeling that he can better serve the public good as a politician, and eventually becomes President of the United States. However, Richmond is attacked by the Overmind, who embarks on a campaign of world domination using an artificial duplicate of him. The real Richmond is rescued by a psychic entity from Earth-616. When the other Squadron members, save for Hyperion, are mind-controlled by the Overmind, Hyperion and Nighthawk recruit the Defenders to help free the Squadron and defeat the alien threat.

The Squadron's Earth is left in shambles after the Overmind's attempt to conquer the world. Led by Hyperion, the Squadron assumes control of the United States and transforms it into an utopia. Nighthawk opposes the Squadron's policies and forms a group called the Redeemers to combat them. A brutal battle ensues in which several members of both teams are killed, including Nighthawk. In response, the Squadron disbands and relinquishes control of the United States government.

=== Neal Richmond (Earth-712) ===
When the remnants of the Squadron Supreme returns to their home universe in the one-shot Squadron Supreme: New World Order, they encounter a new Nighthawk, adopted son of Kyle Richmond and biological son of Kyle's foe the Huckster. The Squadron's reality is now dominated by corporations using the Squadron's own Utopia technologies, with the characters eventually reinstating democracy. For years prior to the Squadron Supreme's return, Neal had organized and supervised a resistance force dubbed the "Nighthawks" who battle the Blue Eagles enlisted by the corporate New World Order. Nighthawk later joins the Squadron.

=== Earth X ===
In Earth X, Kyle Richmond is an elderly retired superhero who Mephisto gave the ability to see into the future. He dictates what he sees to his colleague, Isaac Christians, so that a record can be kept of what will become of history.

=== Ultimate Marvel (Earth-1610) ===
The Ultimate Marvel alternate universe title The Ultimates features a version of Nighthawk who is the leader of a version of the Defenders. The group initially lack superpowers before being given powers by Loki.

=== Kyle Richmond (Earth-31916) ===
The Marvel MAX imprint showcases the adventures of the Earth-31916 version of the Squadron Supreme. This version of Kyle Richmond, an African-American, first appears in the limited series Supreme Power, and utilizes his wealth to train and develop advanced weaponry and devices to aid in his campaign on crime as a vigilante. Although the character aids the loose formation of heroes that eventually become the Squadron Supreme, Nighthawk chooses to remain aloof and only interacts with them when necessary. The character also appears in the six-issue miniseries Supreme Power: Nighthawk, in which he investigates an epidemic of drug addiction in Chicago, and learns it is the work of serial killer Whiteface. Nighthawk apprehends and executes the criminal, but not before he causes the deaths of the Mayor and his family.

After the 2015 "Secret Wars" storyline, Richmond is transported to Earth-616. In 2016, Marvel published a six-issue limited series featuring the character.

Nighthawk and Tilda Johnson later encounter Hawkeye and Red Wolf. He is killed shortly afterwards and succeeded as Nighthawk by Johnson.

== In other media ==
=== Television ===
- The Kyle Richmond incarnation of Nighthawk appears in The Super Hero Squad Show episode "Whom Continuity Would Destroy!", voiced by Adam West.
- The Kyle Richmond incarnation of Nighthawk appears in Avengers Assemble, voiced by Anthony Ruivivar. This version is an alien and tactical strategist who thinks of his team as nothing more than tools; considering himself the architect to Hyperion's hammer.

=== Marvel Cinematic Universe ===
Several characters inspired by Nighthawk appear in media set in the Marvel Cinematic Universe (MCU).

- A character loosely based on the Jackson Norris incarnation of Nighthawk named ''Jackson Norriss'' appears in the Marvel One-Shot All Hail the King, portrayed by Scoot McNairy. This version is a member of the Ten Rings terrorist organization. A video released as part of a viral marketing campaign for Captain America: Civil War in May 2016 revealed that a separate character named Jackson Norris in fact exists elsewhere in the MCU.
- Jackson Norris himself appears in the web series WHIH Newsfront, portrayed by A. J. Bowen. This version is a correspondent for the eponymous news organization.

=== Video games ===
The Kyle Richmond incarnation of Nighthawk appears in Marvel Super Hero Squad Online.

== Collected editions ==
Title	Material collected	Published date	ISBN
Earth X Trilogy Omnibus: Omega	Nighthawk (vol.1) #1-3 and Paradise X: Heralds #1-3, Paradise X #0-12, Xen, Devils, A, X, Special Edition, Paradise X: Ragnarok #1-2	March 2019	978-1302916220
Supreme Power: Nighthawk	Supreme Power: Nighthawk #1-6	July 2006	978-0785118978
Squadron Supreme: Hyperion Vs. Nighthawk	Squadron Supreme: Hyperion Vs. Nighthawk #1-4	July 2007	978-0785124344
Nighthawk: Hate Makes Hate	Nighthawk (vol. 2) #1-6	January 2017	978-1302901622
