= Orka (character) =

Fictional comic book character

- Orka's debut appearance in Sub-Mariner #23 (March 1970). Art by Marie Severin.

Publication information
- Publisher: Marvel Comics
- First appearance: Prince Namor, the Sub-Mariner #23 (March 1970)
- Created by: Roy Thomas (writer); Marie Severin (artist)

In-story information
- Alter ego: Orka
- Species: Homo mermanus
- Team affiliations: Heroes for Hire; Deep Six; Brand Corporation; Defenders of the Deep
- Partnerships: Warlord Krang; Virago
- Notable aliases: Killer Whale
- Abilities: Superhuman strength, speed, agility, stamina, size and durability Superhuman swimming speed Ability to breathe both on land and in water Able to communicate with and summon killer whales via high-pitched whistles Orca-based empowerment Formerly: Land adaptation via belt

Orka is a fictional character appearing in American comic books published by Marvel Comics. The character was created by Roy Thomas and Marie Severin, and has a killer whale theme. Orka primarily appears as a villain fighting the Avengers, the Fantastic Four, She-Hulk, and the Defenders, and also appears as a member of Heroes for Hire.

== Publication history ==
Orka first appears in Prince Namor, the Sub-Mariner #23 (March 1970) and was created by Roy Thomas and Marie Severin.

== Fictional character biography ==
Orka is originally an Atlantean soldier in the army of Warlord Krang who aids the renegade Krang when he attempts to usurp the Atlantean throne from Namor. When this attempt fails, Orka goes into exile from Atlantis with Krang. Orka is then chosen to be the test subject of Lemuel Dorcas, the marine scientist who created Tiger Shark, one of Namor's arch foes. Courtesy of a belt with a psionic amplifier, Orka is given the power of an orca and aids Krang once more against Namor. Orka skirmishes with Tiger Shark, causing an undersea avalanche that buries them for several months.

Orka eventually escapes and allies with the other-dimensional Virago, and after battling Namor twice is defeated. The Brand Corporation (a subsidiary of Roxxon Energy Corporation) summon Orka with the aid of the Serpent Crown and augment his abilities, allowing him to use his powers without his belt. Orka is sent on a mission that brings him into conflict with superhero team the Avengers, with Thor knocking him unconscious.

When the Atlantean barbarian Attuma takes over Atlantis, Orka is pardoned from his exile and joins the Imperial Army. Part of an invasion force that attacks the surface world, Orka battles the Avengers and the Fantastic Four, but is defeated by heroine She-Hulk and the Black Panther and imprisoned.

Orka escapes imprisonment and joins marine team Deep Six (also consisting of Attuma, Nagala, Piranha, Sea Urchin and Tiger Shark). The group attack the United States and battles the Avengers and the People's Protectorate and are eventually defeated.

Orka features in several other Marvel titles such as Fantastic Four, She-Hulk, and The Defenders. After the events of "Civil War", Orka features in the title Heroes for Hire and joins the team (also falling in love with fellow member Misty Knight). Orka is killed in combat by a Doombot reprogrammed by the Headmen.

During the "Dark Reign" storyline, Orka is seen in Erebus gambling for his resurrection. He is later seen on Pluto's jury (alongside Abomination, Armless Tiger Man, Artume, Baron Heinrich Zemo, Commander Kraken, Iron Monger, Jack O'Lantern, Kyknos, Nessus, Scourge of the Underworld, and Veranke) at the trial of Zeus.

Orka turns up alive and is imprisoned in the Cellar by soldiers working for Regent's company Empire Unlimited.

Orka later appears as a member of Namor's Defenders of the Deep.

== Powers and abilities ==
Orka is an exceptionally strong Atlantean, who courtesy of Doctor Dorcas' enhancements Orka has superhuman strength, speed, stamina, durability, and agility. Orka originally wore a belt which by psionic means provided the added power of an orca to his already considerable strength. The belt also allowed Orka to survive for indefinite periods on land, although he still loses strength due to dehydration. Using surgical and electrochemical enhancements, the Brand Corporation augmented Orka's natural abilities, which allowed him to retain his strength without the use of the belt. The experimentation also increased Orka's size, resilience and endurance, but at the cost of reduced intelligence. Orka can communicate with and summon orcas through high-pitched whistles; so long as there are orcas in his vicinity, Orka's physical abilities increase several time over. He can also swim at superhuman speeds.

== In other media ==
Orka appears in the Avengers Assemble episode "King Breaker", voiced by Roger Craig Smith.
