= In Mortal Combat with... Sub-Mariner! =

Marvel Comics superhero story

- Cover art to Daredevil #7. Art by Wally Wood and Stan Goldberg.
- Publisher: Marvel Comics
- Publication date: April 1965
- Genre: Superhero
- Title(s): Daredevil #7
- Main character(s): Daredevil, Namor

Creative team
- Writer: Stan Lee
- Artist: Wally Wood
- Letterer: Artie Simek
- Editor: Stan Lee

"In Mortal Combat with... Sub-Mariner!" is a superhero story in the Marvel Comics series Daredevil. Written by Stan Lee and illustrated by Wally Wood, it was published in Daredevil #7 (cover dated April 1965). The story is about Namor the Sub-Mariner, who hires the attorney Matt Murdock, the secret identity of the superhero Daredevil, to help him sue the human race. After Murdock tells Namor that such a lawsuit is impossible, Namor goes on a rampage through New York City, and Daredevil asks the military to let him fight Namor in place of its soldiers. Daredevil is defeated, but his courage earns Namor's respect, and Namor leaves without fighting the army.

"In Mortal Combat with... Sub-Mariner!" considers the limits of the legal system when it confronts superpowered individuals, and it presents heroism through vulnerability rather than victory. The issue contains the first appearance of Daredevil's red costume.

The story has been praised by several commentators, and Lee himself cited it as one of his favorite Marvel stories. In 2026, ComicBook.com ranked it tenth in a list of Lee's ten best stories. It was later reprinted as the opening story of a Namor collection in the Mighty Marvel Masterworks line.

== Plot ==
Namor, the prince of Atlantis, is persuaded by Krang to reclaim the surface world. Rather than start a war, he decides to press his claim through its legal system. Namor travels to New York City, intending to sue the United States over its treatment of Atlantis, and chooses Nelson & Murdock to represent him. In Murdock's office, Namor announces that he wishes to "sue the entire human race" for depriving his people of their birthright. Murdock replies that this is impossible, as there is no legal precedent for such a case and no single nation represents the human race.

Concluding that the courts will have to hear his claim if he forces them to, Namor begins wrecking parts of the city and is arrested for his crimes against the United States. At his trial, Murdock attempts to file a countercharge against the entire human race on Namor's behalf, but the judge rules the motion out of order until the trial has ended. The district attorney charges Namor with offenses including assault, attempting to overthrow the government by force, alien sedition, and willful destruction of property, and Namor reacts angrily to the prosecutor. Murdock argues that Namor, as the supreme monarch of his people, cannot be expected to accept treatment as a common criminal, and the judge calls a recess to consider the point. As the recess begins, Dorma enters the courtroom, and the district attorney remarks that a whole new set of law books will be needed.

Meanwhile, Namor learns that Krang has seized control of Atlantis while he was away on land. Namor tells his captors that matters can resume after he has put down the coup, but the military insists on sending him to jail. Unfazed by imprisonment, and impatient with what he considers the slowness of surface-world justice, Namor breaks out and goes on another rampage while the army prepares to fight him.

Matt, Karen Page, and Foggy Nelson watch news coverage of the attack as the military mobilizes. Daredevil, wearing his red costume for the first time, realizes that a fight between the army and Namor would kill many soldiers, and he bargains with the military to let him confront Namor instead. Both Daredevil and the soldiers doubt that he can stop Namor. Daredevil marvels at Namor's apparent invulnerability, while Namor is astonished by how vulnerable Daredevil is. Daredevil tries an array of tactics to distract and tire Namor, who thinks the fight is finally over until Daredevil picks himself up. In a last attempt to slow Namor, Daredevil electrocutes him, but he absorbs part of the shock and is so badly hurt that he cannot stand when he tries to continue.

Standing over the nearly unconscious Daredevil, Namor says that among the superpowered people he has fought, including the Fantastic Four and the Avengers, none has been more courageous. Namor agrees to fly away and avoid the army entirely, returning to Atlantis and promising to return to the surface world when humanity least expects it. The issue ends with a comic scene in which Karen Page, seeing Murdock's extensive injuries, hurries to him and suspects that he was hurt in an accident. When she trips over a chair in his office, Murdock catches her, and she marvels at his knack for such feats.

== Creation and publication ==
As Marvel slightly expanded its superhero output in 1963 and 1964, it needed more artists and had gained enough prestige to attract some of the top artists of the 1950s. When Bill Everett could not keep up with the deadlines of the newly launched Daredevil series, Stan Lee first turned to Joe Orlando, a veteran of EC Comics. Orlando was dissatisfied with the extra plotting the job required, for which he was not paid, and with the many revisions Lee requested to bring his work closer to Marvel's preferred style. Tom Brevoort recalled that Orlando said he had to pencil seven or eight pages for every five that were accepted. Orlando recommended his fellow EC Comics alumnus Wally Wood, who took over the series with issue #5.

Namor had recently declared war on humanity in Fantastic Four Annual #1 by Jack Kirby, Stan Lee, and Dick Ayers, which is context for the threat he poses in the story.

The issue introduced Daredevil's red costume, which Brian Cronin of CBR described as one of the greatest costume redesigns in superhero history. Matt's original costume was a form-fitting mix of yellow, red, and black made from the old boxing robes of his late father, "Battling" Jack Murdock, and it was largely shelved after issue #6. As early as issue #7, Matt switched to a tight scarlet costume with a matching cowl, which featured a stylized "DD" in place of the original single "D," dropped the vest, and gave the billy clubs their own holster on the left thigh.

Namor was scheduled to receive his own regular feature in Tales to Astonish, replacing Giant-Man and the Wasp, with Wood as artist. Wood, however, was growing tired of working with Lee and insisted on being paid as a writer as well as an artist. Lee tried the arrangement, but it fell apart quickly, and Wood left Marvel, withdrawing from the Namor feature. Marvel instead brought in Gene Colan to launch the feature.

== Themes and analysis ==
In a 2007 article on superheroes and the law, Jason Bainbridge used the story as an example of the argument that superheroes operate outside the law because the legal system is ill-equipped to deal with the threats they face and struggles to keep pace with social and technological change. Bainbridge reads the courtroom scene as demonstrating the inadequacy of the legal system in handling superpowered individuals like Namor and in recognizing the sovereign rights of Atlantis. He also argues that Namor’s decision to seek a legal remedy shows his recognition of the importance of law to the surface world, because law gives people a voice, even if that voice is fragmented and incomplete.

A 2020 article on Daredevil calls issue #7 the clearest example of the entanglement between the character, the city, and vulnerability. It argues that a page showing Namor’s attack is divided into three units, with Matt, Karen, and Nelson watching the news, the military mobilizing, and Namor collapsing columns between them, so that the page moves from the level of the individual to the city to the nation or world under threat. The article reads the classical architecture in the image as a sign of the collapse of any legal apparatus able to handle the attack, and it argues that Daredevil intervenes where Murdock the lawyer cannot. The article further argues that the ending subverts the expectation of a physical victory by showing Daredevil as a human being whose primary virtue is vulnerability, and that this runs counter to Alaniz’s theory of the masquerade. It reads the final scene with Karen Page as extending the issue’s concern with recognition, since her habitual misrecognition of Murdock gives way to a moment of shared vulnerability.

In a 2005 interview with Alter Ego, Lee said that he found a way for Daredevil to lose to the far more powerful Namor in a heroic manner, so that both characters emerge triumphant, and he added, “I really hope someday they make a movie out of this particular situation.” ScreenRant writer Ambrose Tardive describes the issue as Daredevil’s first fight against a superpowered opponent who totally outmatched him, and he argues that it is the earliest example of Daredevil’s limitations being used as a dramatic asset. Tardive adds that it showed Daredevil’s wit and tactical intelligence to be as valuable as raw power, and that it reminded readers of Namor’s status as Marvel’s first antihero. ComicBook.com writer Jack Pecau, summarizing the story, emphasized that it is the person rather than the powers that makes someone a hero, since Daredevil’s skill and determination to protect New Yorkers earned Namor’s respect even though he was outclassed. Brooke, reviewing a later reprint, wrote that Lee was evidently trying to prove that Namor is among the strongest characters in the Marvel Universe, noting that Namor walks through walls and breaks bricks with ease, and that after Murdock explains that Namor needs attention, Namor decides that breaking laws is the best way to get it.

== Reception and legacy ==
Tardive describes the issue as having played a pivotal role in Daredevil's formative years and as remaining one of Namor's best appearances. He notes that Lee's hope for a film version had not been realized twenty years after the interview, and he argues that an adaptation in the Marvel Cinematic Universe would honor Lee's legacy. In 2026, Jack Pecau ranked the story tenth in a list of Lee's ten best stories for ComicBook.com.

In 2022, Marvel released Mighty Marvel Masterworks: Namor, The Sub-Mariner Vol. 1: The Quest Begins, which opens with Daredevil #7 and then moves on to Namor's adventures in Tales to Astonish. Brooke described the issue as an over-the-top and outrageous but fun opening, and he noted that Wood drew the Daredevil issue while Colan drew most of the rest of the collection. He also observed that the art of these early stories holds up well.
