= Super-Villain Team-Up =

Comic book series in United States

- Cover of Giant-Size Super-Villain Team-Up #2. Art by Gil Kane and Al Milgrom.

Publication information
- Publisher: Marvel Comics
- Schedule: Giant-Size Super-Villain Team-Up: Quarterly; Super-Villain Team-Up: Bimonthly (#1–14); Irregularly (#15–17); Super-Villain Team-Up: MODOK's 11: Monthly
- Format: Super-Villain Team-Up: Ongoing series Super-Villain Team-Up: MODOK's 11: Mini-series
- Publication date: Giant-Size Super-Villain Team-Up: March 1975 – June 1975; Super-Villain Team-Up: August 1975 – June 1980; Super-Villain Team-Up: MODOK's 11: July 2007 – November 2007
- No. of issues: Giant-Size Super-Villain Team-Up: 2 Super-Villain Team-Up: 17; Super-Villain Team-Up: MODOK's 11: 5
- Main character: List: Super-Villain Team-Up: Doctor Doom Namor Super-Villain Team-Up: MODOK's 11: MODOK Puma Mentallo Armadillo Chameleon Deadly Nightshade Living Laser Rocket Racer Spot

Creative team
- Written by: List: Giant-Size Super-Villain Team-Up: Roy Thomas Super-Villain Team-Up: Steve Englehart, Peter B. Gillis, Tony Isabella, Bill Mantlo, Jim Shooter Super-Villain Team-Up: MODOK's 11: Fred Van Lente
- Penciller: List: Giant-Size Super-Villain Team-Up: John Buscema, Mike Sekowsky Super-Villain Team-Up: Sal Buscema, George Evans, Keith Giffen, Bob Hall, Carmine Infantino, Arvell Jones, Jim Shooter, Herb Trimpe, George Tuska Super-Villain Team-Up: MODOK's 11: Francis Portela
- Inker: List: Giant-Size Super-Villain Team-Up: Sam Grainger, Joe Sinnott Super-Villain Team-Up: Jack Abel, Fred Kida, Pablo Marcos, Owen McCarron, Jim Mooney, Bruce Patterson, Don Perlin, Sal Trapani, Duffy Vohland Super-Villain Team-Up: MODOK's 11: Francis Portela

Collected editions
- Essential Super-Villain Team-Up: ISBN 978-0785115458
- Super-Villain Team-Up: MODOK's 11: ISBN 978-0785119920

Super-Villain Team-Up is the name of two American comic book series published by Marvel Comics. Both series featured supervillains as the protagonists.

== Publication history ==
The first series started in 1975 with two giant-size issues before launching as a regular series, and was mostly bi-monthly during its existence. It initially teamed up Doctor Doom and the Sub-Mariner, who had lost his own series, from which it picked up the unresolved plots, especially that of the comatose Atlanteans. After a succession of writers and artists and a crossover with The Avengers, the plot gets resolved in issue #13 when Doctor Doom revives the Atlanteans, thus dissolving his alliance with the Sub-Mariner.

Issue #14 (Oct. 1977), which featured Magneto and Doctor Doom, was billed as the final issue of the series and its plotline was resolved in The Champions #16. The following year, SVTU continued with issue #15 (Nov. 1978), a reprint of Astonishing Tales #4–5. Issues #16 (May 1979) and #17 (June 1980) featured the Red Skull and the Hate-Monger. The irregular publishing frequency of the final three issues was due to a legal maneuver to prevent DC Comics from trademarking the term "super-villain".

The series saw the death of the Sub-Mariner's 1940s sweetheart Betty Dean and the death of her murderer, Doctor Dorcas. Steve Englehart created The Shroud, a character partly inspired by Batman, shortly before he started to work for DC Comics on Detective Comics.

== Issues ==
Issue	Cover date	Character	Character	Notes
Giant–Size #1	March 1975	Doctor Doom	Sub-Mariner	new framing story by writer Roy Thomas and artists John Buscema and Joe Sinnott. Reprints Sub-Mariner #20 (December 1969) and Marvel Super-Heroes #20 (May 1969).
Giant–Size #2	June 1975	Doctor Doom	Sub-Mariner	vs. the Doomsman
#1	August 1975	Doctor Doom	Sub-Mariner	vs. Attuma, Doctor Dorcas, and Tiger Shark
#2	October 1975	Doctor Doom	Sub-Mariner	vs. Attuma, Doctor Dorcas, and Tiger Shark
#3	December 1975	Doctor Doom	Sub-Mariner	vs. Attuma, Doctor Dorcas, and Tiger Shark
#4	February 1976	Doctor Doom	Sub-Mariner	
#5	April 1976	Doctor Doom	Sub-Mariner	vs. the Fantastic Four
#6	June 1976	Doctor Doom	Sub-Mariner	vs. the Fantastic Four and the Shroud
#7	August 1976	Doctor Doom	Sub-Mariner	vs. the Shroud
#8	October 1976	Doctor Doom	Sub-Mariner	vs. the Ringmaster
#9	December 1976	Doctor Doom	Sub-Mariner	vs. Attuma. Crossover with The Avengers #154–156 (Dec. 1976–Feb. 1977)
#10	February 1977	Doctor Doom	Sub-Mariner	vs. the Red Skull
#11	April 1977	Doctor Doom	Red Skull	
#12	June 1977	Doctor Doom	Red Skull	
#13	August 1977	Doctor Doom	Sub-Mariner	vs. Warlord Krang
#14	October 1977	Doctor Doom	Magneto	crossover with The Champions #16 (November 1977)
#15	November 1978	Doctor Doom	Red Skull	reprints Astonishing Tales #4 (February 1971) and #5 (April 1971)
#16	May 1979	Red Skull	Hate-Monger	
#17	June 1980	Red Skull	Hate-Monger	also featuring Arnim Zola

== Super-Villain Team-Up: MODOK's 11 ==
In 2007 Marvel published Super-Villain Team-Up: MODOK's 11, a five-issue miniseries featuring 11 supervillains in the manner of the movie Ocean's Eleven.

== Doctor Doom and the Masters of Evil ==
This 2009 miniseries features Doctor Doom working with other villains.

- #1 - Doctor Doom collaborates with the Sinister Six (Doctor Octopus, the Chameleon, Kraven the Hunter, Mysterio, the Sandman, and the Vulture)
- #2 - Doctor Doom collaborates with the Circus of Crime to beat Baron Zemo's Masters of Evil to a Hittite temple.
- #3 - Doctor Doom and his "Masters of Evil" clash with Blastaar.
- #4 - Doctor Doom collaborates with Magneto and Princess Python to steal an item from Selene.

== Collected editions ==
- Essential Super-Villain Team-Up collects Giant-Size Super-Villain Team-Up #1–2 and Super-Villain Team-Up #1–17, 552 pages, September 2004, ISBN 978-0785115458
- Super-Villain Team-Up: MODOK's 11 collects Super-Villain Team-Up: MODOK's 11 #1–5, 120 pages, February 2008, ISBN 978-0785119920
- Doctor Doom and the Masters of Evil collects Doctor Doom and the Masters of Evil #1–4, 120 pages, July 2009, ISBN 978-0785138440
- Super-Villains Unite: The Complete Super-Villain Team-Up collects Giant-Size Super-Villain Team-Up #1–2; Super-Villain Team-Up #1–14, 16–17; The Avengers #154–156; Champions #16, 464 pages, March 2015, ISBN 978-0785194064
