= U-Man =

- U-Man, from the page of The Marvels Project #7 (March 2010). Art by Steve Epting

Publication information
- Publisher: Marvel Comics
- First appearance: The Invaders #3 (November 1975)
- Created by: Roy Thomas (Writer); Frank Robbins (Artist)

In-story information
- Alter ego: Meranno
- Species: Homo mermanus
- Place of origin: Atlantis
- Team affiliations: Super-Axis
- Abilities: Superhuman strength, stamina, durability, speed, agility, and reflexes; Underwater breathing

U-Man (Meranno) is a fictional character appearing in American comic books published by Marvel Comics.

U-Man was created by Roy Thomas and Frank Robbins and first appeared in The Invaders #3 (November 1975). He is an Atlantean warrior and scientist who, due to his hatred for Namor the Sub-Mariner, allies himself with Nazi Germany, leading to his banishment from Atlantis. He willingly undergoes Nazi procedures to enhance his size and strength, and takes on the alias U-Man. Despite his villainous actions, he has occasionally aided superhero teams in the modern Marvel Universe. U-Man's powers include breathing underwater, surviving on land indefinitely, and enhanced strength, stamina, durability, speed, agility, and reflexes, thanks to Nazi science. He is also trained in warfare.

== Creation ==
The character was created as an homage to the DC Comics character Aquaman.

== Publication history ==
U-Man first appears in The Invaders #3 (November 1975) and was created by Roy Thomas and Frank Robbins.

== Fictional character biography ==
Meranno is an Atlantean warrior and scientist. Like hero Namor the Sub-Mariner, he is a member of the Atlantean race Homo mermanus. It is revealed in flashback that Meranno despised Namor when they were children, and in adulthood allies himself with Nazi Germany. Still consumed with hatred for Namor, the character reveals the location of the city of Atlantis to the German forces, who destroy the Atlantean fleet and place Emperor Thakorr in a coma. Thakorr is succeeded by Namor who banishes Meranno from Atlantis for treason.

Meranno adopts the alias of U-Man, and willingly submits to Nazi procedures that increase his size and strength. Joining a fleet of U-boats, U-Man wreaks havoc on the Allied fleet until defeated by the superhero team the Invaders. The character reappears in a two part story in the title Marvel Two-In-One, and with Nazi allies Brain Drain, Master Man, and Sky Shark, plans to sabotage New York City with a new super weapon. The plan, however, is foiled by time travelling Fantastic Four member the Thing and the Liberty Legion.

U-Man reappears in the title The Invaders under the mental control of Japanese spy Lady Lotus, and battles teen group the Kid Commandos and the Invaders and joins the Nazi group Super-Axis for a final confrontation with the superhero team.

U-Man appears in the modern Marvel Universe during the Atlantis Attacks storyline, and features in an Avengers annual with fellow Namor foe Attuma in an attack on the surface world. The character becomes a reluctant ally in the title Avengers, aiding the superhero team, Canadian heroes Alpha Flight, and Soviet group the People's Protectorate in preventing a nuclear holocaust.

An issue of the limited series New Invaders reveals in flashback that U-Man raped Lady Lotus in retaliation for her earlier mind control. Lotus eventually gives birth to their child Nia Noble.

== Powers and abilities ==
As an Atlantean, Meranno can breathe and move freely underwater, as well as survive for an indefinite period on land. Courtesy of Nazi science, he has inhuman strength, stamina, durability, speed, agility, and reflexes. U-Man was trained in the arts of warfare.
