= Lemuel Dorcas =

Doctor Lemuel Dorcas
- Lemuel Dorcas as depicted in Thunderbolts #171 (May 2012). Art by Kev Walker.

Publication information
- Publisher: Marvel Comics
- First appearance: Sub-Mariner #5 (September 1968)
- Created by: Roy Thomas (writer); John Buscema (artist)

In-story information
- Full name: Lemuel Dorcas
- Species: Human mutate
- Partnerships: Attuma; Byrrah; Warlord Krang; Tiger Shark
- Abilities: Expert biologist; Device usage; Aquatic adaptation; Genius-level intellect; Regeneration

Lemuel Dorcas is a fictional character appearing in American comic books published by Marvel Comics. He is notable for playing a part in the origins of Namor villains Tiger Shark, Orka, and Piranha.

== Publication history ==
Dr. Lemuel Dorcas first appeared in Sub-Mariner #5-6 (September-October 1968), and was created by Roy Thomas and John Buscema.

The character subsequently appeared in Sub-Mariner #15 (July 1969), #23-24 (March-April 1970), #33 (January 1971), Marvel Team-Up #14 (October 1973), and Super-Villain Team-Up #1-3 (August-December 1975), where he was apparently killed. The character made a posthumous appearance in Marvel Tales #249 (May 1991), and his body was later dumped into the ocean in Namor #42 (September 1993). Dorcas returned in the series Thunderbolts (2012), where he was revealed to have survived by augmenting himself with the regenerative abilities of starfish.

Dorcas received an entry in the Official Handbook of the Marvel Universe Deluxe Edition #17.

== Fictional character biography ==
Dr. Lemuel Dorcas is a human scientist and would-be conqueror. Dorcas is responsible for transforming Olympic swimmer Todd Arliss into the superhuman Tiger Shark by augmenting him with the DNA of Namor and a tiger shark. Dorcas plans to use Tiger Shark as a pawn in his schemes of world conquest.

Dorcas forms alliances with Namor's enemies Krang and Byrrah, with Krang providing his follower Orka as a test subject. Dorcas gives Orka powers akin to a orca and uses him to attack Atlantis, but is thwarted by Namor and Tiger Shark.

Dorcas was also inadvertently responsible for the creation of Piranha, a normal piranha who was exposed to radiation from Dorcas' previous experiment and mutated into a humanoid form.

Dorcas is seemingly killed during a battle with Namor after one of Attuma's war machines crushes him. Long after his apparent death, Dorcas is revealed to have survived due to conducting experiments with starfish, giving him regenerative abilities. After setting up a base in Tetiaroa Atoll, Dorcas mutates several creatures to serve him and keeps them under his control with neuroleeches. Dorcas develops an obsession for Songbird and captures her, only for her to escape and turn his henchmen against him.

== Powers and abilities ==
Lemuel Dorcas initially did not possess powers, but had genius-level intellect. Dorcas later mutated himself with starfish tissue, giving him starfish-like features. This allows him to breathe underwater and regrow lost limbs.

=== Equipment ===
He employed many devices ranging from the Morphotron to laser guns and nuclear bombs.

== Other versions ==
An alternate universe version of Lemuel Dorcas from Earth-1610 appears in the Ultimate Marvel imprint. This version is an Atlantean and advisor to Namora.
