= Marvel: Ultimate Alliance =

2006 superhero action roleplaying game

- Developer: Raven Software (Note: Beenox ported the 2006 Windows version, Vicarious Visions ported the Wii and PlayStation Portable versions, and re-release version ported by Zoë Mode. Barking Lizards Technologies developed the Game Boy Advance version.)
- Publisher: Activision
- Director: Dan Vondrak
- Producer: Matthew Paul
- Designer: Keith Fuller
- Programmers: Daniel Edwards; Gil Gribb
- Artist: Dan Hay
- Writer: Robert Love
- Composers: Mark Griskey; Chance Thomas; Cris Velasco
- Series: Marvel: Ultimate Alliance
- Engine: Vicarious Visions Alchemy
- Platforms: Xbox; Windows; PlayStation 2; Xbox 360; Game Boy Advance; PlayStation Portable; Wii; PlayStation 3; PlayStation 4; Xbox One
- Release: October 24, 2006: Xbox; NA: October 24, 2006; EU: October 27, 2006; AU: November 1, 2006 Windows; NA: October 24, 2006; AU: November 1, 2006; EU: November 3, 2006; WW: July 26, 2016 (2016 re-release) PS2, Xbox 360, Game Boy Advance; NA: October 24, 2006; AU: November 1, 2006; EU: November 3, 2006 PlayStation Portable; NA: October 24, 2006; EU: December 1, 2006; AU: December 6, 2006 Wii; NA: November 19, 2006; AU: December 21, 2006; EU: December 22, 2006 PlayStation 3; NA: November 17, 2006; EU: March 23, 2007; AU: March 23, 2007 PlayStation 4; WW: July 26, 2016 Xbox One; WW: July 28, 2016
- Genre: Action role-playing
- Modes: Single-player, multiplayer

Marvel: Ultimate Alliance is a 2006 action role-playing game developed by Raven Software and published by Activision. Ultimate Alliance is set within the fictional Marvel Universe and features many of the superheroes, supervillains, and supporting characters that appear in publications by Marvel Comics. It shares many similarities with Raven Software's previous Marvel titles, X-Men Legends and X-Men Legends II: Rise of Apocalypse, in that it allows players to select from its vast cast to create the ultimate superhero team. The game features an original plot in which the heroes of the Marvel Universe must join forces to defeat Doctor Doom and his Masters of Evil and foil their plans for global domination.

The PlayStation 2, Xbox and Xbox 360 versions (developed solely by Raven Software) were released on October 24, 2006. Additional versions for PlayStation Portable (ported by Vicarious Visions) and Microsoft Windows (ported by Beenox) were released on the same day, as well as a distinctly different Game Boy Advance version, developed by Barking Lizards Technologies. Shortly thereafter, Ultimate Alliance was released as a launch title for both the PlayStation 3 and Wii consoles in November 2006, the latter ported by Vicarious Visions; the PlayStation 3 version was one of three launch games for the system (along with NBA 07 and Ridge Racer 7) to run at 1080p resolution.

Upon release, the game was met with largely positive reviews from critics, who praised its simple but entertaining gameplay, and its impressive selection of Marvel characters. A sequel, Marvel: Ultimate Alliance 2, was developed for multiple platforms by Vicarious Visions, n-Space and Savage Entertainment and released in 2009. A third game, Marvel Ultimate Alliance 3: The Black Order, was developed by Koei Tecmo's Team Ninja and published by Nintendo for the Nintendo Switch in 2019. Marvel: Ultimate Alliance was re-released in 2016, ported by Zoë Mode, on Windows, PlayStation 4, and Xbox One.

== Gameplay ==
=== Consoles, PC and PSP ===
Like the X-Men Legends series, Ultimate Alliance is an action role-playing game and retains much of the same gameplay and combat. However, some of the role-playing elements have been simplified. Character powers can still be upgraded as the characters gain experience points, but there are fewer powers compared to X-Men Legends II, and the game now defaults to automatically upgrading them. Character stats are only upgraded automatically.

All of the main versions of the game allow the players to select a team of four characters from a roster of at least 23 playable characters. Some characters from the base roster are not initially available and need to be unlocked, and certain consoles feature additional exclusive characters. Players can create their own superhero teams or recreate famous teams from the comics. Bonuses are also available if forming certain groups (e.g. the Avengers, Defenders, Fantastic Four, Marvel Knights, or X-Men).

All versions of the game (except for PSP) feature local multiplayer with up to four players playing at once, and many contain online multiplayer as well. The game has multiple possible endings depending on which optional missions the player completes. Throughout the story, the player can play trivia and collect concept artwork and "simulator discs", which unlock additional comic book missions that take place outside of the story.

Each character also has four alternate costumes that offer different bonuses. The bonuses can also be leveled up using the in-game currency. The initial costume is unlocked from the beginning of the game, while the latter three costumes must be unlocked through specific conditions. Certain costumes change the character's appearance to resemble other characters who have held that mantle in the Marvel Universe, including Iron Man as War Machine, Thor as Beta Ray Bill, Spider-Woman as Spider-Girl and Julia Carpenter from Secret Wars, Ghost Rider as Phantom Rider, and Ms. Marvel as Sharon Ventura.

==== Console-specific differences ====
Visually, the versions of the game can be broadly classified into last-gen (PlayStation 2, PSP, Wii, and Xbox) and next-gen graphics (PlayStation 3, Xbox 360, PC, and re-releases). The last-gen graphics are more simplified, lacking complex lighting and using less detailed character models. The next-gen graphics are improved for the more powerful consoles and feature more detailed character models and advanced lighting.

The PlayStation 2 and Xbox versions of the game feature the base roster of 23 characters, with no additional content. Colossus and Moon Knight are not found in these versions of the game, but it is possible to play as them through a glitch. In August 2007, the PlayStation 2 version was re-released under Sony's Greatest Hits brand; it contained a bonus DVD with a making-of featurette.

The Wii version features the use of the Wii's motion controls for combat. It has no online play. Like the next-gen versions of the game, it includes Colossus and Moon Knight on the roster, as well as the five additional comic book missions.

The PSP version of the game includes four additional characters: Black Widow, Captain Marvel, Hawkeye, and Ronin. There are several additional unique features, including six exclusive comic book missions (one of which contains Swordsman), an exclusive prequel mission, and three additional single-player gameplay modes. There is also microphone support (voice chat) for online play, as well as online-recordable player statistics.

The Xbox 360 version of the game features eight downloadable content characters.

The PlayStation 3 and Xbox 360 versions initially released with identical content. Both included Colossus and Moon Knight on the roster, as well as five additional comic book missions. On April 26, 2007, Activision released eight additional downloadable characters for the Xbox 360 version via the Xbox LIVE Marketplace. This consisted of two packs: A Hero Pack, which included Cyclops, Hawkeye, the Hulk, and Nightcrawler, and a Villain Pack, which included Doctor Doom, Magneto, Sabretooth, and Venom. Both packs were also available in a bundle pack, which added 12 new achievements to the game. In May 2007, the DLC content was bundled with the base Xbox 360 version and released as the Gold Edition. In September 2007, the Special Edition version was released, which includes all elements of the Gold Edition and a bonus DVD. This was included in the Platinum Hits list for the Xbox 360. As of December 2009, the DLC was removed from the Xbox LIVE Marketplace by Activision, meaning that the only way to play as the downloadable characters was to purchase the Gold Edition or the Special Edition/Platinum Hits version. The Xbox 360 Games on Demand version bundles the game with all previously downloadable content.

The PC version of the game only contains the base roster of 23 characters, and it lacks the characters and missions that come with the other next-gen versions. The graphics are also customizable; while the graphics are virtually identical to the PlayStation 3 and Xbox 360 versions, the advanced lighting settings can be altered or turned off per the user's preference. The PC version features customizable controls, which includes "intiuitive mouse controls" and support for a gamepad. The missing console-exclusive characters and missions, as well as a large list of custom characters and other modifications, can be obtained from community sites to be used in the game.

The re-released versions of the game on the Xbox One, PlayStation 4 and Microsoft Windows via Steam are based on the Xbox 360 version of the game. Initially, these versions only contained the base roster and missions found in the PlayStation 3 and Xbox 360 versions. On August 30, 2016, an update was released for all three versions which contained the eight downloadable characters and exclusive missions, bringing the re-release more in line with the Xbox 360 Gold Edition.

=== Game Boy Advance ===
The Game Boy Advance version of Ultimate Alliance features significant differences from the other console versions. Most notably, the basic gameplay takes the form of a 2D side-scrolling beat 'em up game with minor RPG elements, such as the ability to alter the player characters' stats. The graphics are simplified for this system and the selection of characters has also been reduced. Some additional gameplay modes were added to this version of the game including a S.H.I.E.L.D. Simulator, Time Challenges, Scavenger Hunts, and a Survival mode. Teams for this port consist of three characters and a non-playable fourth character called a "striker", who can be summoned to perform a powerful attack directed toward on-screen enemies.

== Plot ==
After Doctor Doom and the Masters of Evil attack the S.H.I.E.L.D. Helicarrier, Nick Fury sends a distress call to all available superheroes for assistance. Captain America, Spider-Man, Thor, and Wolverine respond to the call and save the Helicarrier from Ultron sentries led by Fin Fang Foom. Fury is given permission to start a task force to confront the Masters of Evil and Iron Man allows them to use Stark Tower as their headquarters.

Fury asks the heroes to investigate a message received from Dum Dum Dugan on the Omega Base, a S.H.I.E.L.D. mobile research facility. The team defeats supervillains MODOK, Crimson Dynamo, and Mysterio as well as A.I.M. agents and failed Super Soldier experiments to prevent the Omega Base from crashing into a dam and launching several gamma bombs.

With their mission successful, the heroes travel to Atlantis, where Attuma has usurped Namor and taken control of the Atlanteans' minds. With the help of nano-technology that enables them to breathe and move freely underwater, the heroes fight the mind-controlled Atlanteans, destroy the towers which are guarded by Krang and Byrrah, rescue Namor, and defeat Attuma and Tiger Shark. After defeating Attuma, the heroes encounter Mandarin, who unleashes the Kraken on them. The team defeats the Kraken by toppling pillars on it.

The heroes travel to the Valley of Spirits to confront Mandarin in his palace. After his defeat, Mandarin reveals that he attempted to take command of the Masters of Evil and, upon failing, left the group. He suggests that the Mandarin they saw in the catacombs was actually Loki, Thor's adoptive brother and the god of mischief.

Upon returning to base, the team learns that Nightcrawler and Jean Grey have been kidnapped as well as Senator Robert Kelly. Due to the involvement of mystical forces, Fury has the team relocated to the Sanctum Sanctorum, offered as a temporary headquarters by Doctor Strange. Professor X tracks Nightcrawler to Castle Doom. Upon trying to transport the heroes there, they are sent to Murderworld by Baron Mordo. After defeating a mind-controlled Jean, Rhino, and Shocker, the heroes battle a mech piloted by Arcade.

Victorious, the heroes learn that Doom has used Nightcrawler to access Mephisto's realm. Upon arriving, minions of Mephisto kidnap Jean Grey and Nightcrawler. Mephisto's son Blackheart puts the two in cages above the Infinity Vortex, stating one must be saved and the other sacrificed. During their battle with Mephisto, the sacrificed hero is resurrected by Mephisto and placed under his control. As a final effort, the resurrected hero sacrifices their life to defeat Mephisto and allow the team to escape.

Meanwhile in Asgard, an army of Super Soldiers attacks and imprisons the Asgardian gods. The heroes travel to Valhalla to free Heimdall, Tyr, and Balder. Looking for Odin in Niffleheim following a fight with Kurse and Ulik, they find his shattered Twilight Sword and learn from Ymir that Doom and Loki have taken Odin to Raven's Spire. After Loki is seemingly defeated at Raven's Spire, the team frees the Destroyer armor to use against Doom. Loki, disguised as Fury, reveals himself and his plot to have the heroes free the armor for nefarious purposes. As heroes defeat Loki and the armor, Doom appears and reveals that he has stolen Odin's power. He uses it to attempt to eliminate the heroes, but Uatu the Watcher saves them and transports them to the Inhumans' base on the moon.

Uatu reveals that Doom's unrestricted use of Odin's power will eventually destroy the universe and that the only way to defeat him is to acquire a piece of the M'Kraan Crystal from a Shi'ar warship and steal the Muonic Inducer from Galactus, who is attacking the Skrull homeworld.

Meanwhile, Doom conquers Earth, defeating and corrupting many of the other heroes who attempted but failed to stop him as well as creating clones of the heroes. In a final effort, the team travels to Latveria to confront Doom. The heroes use the M'Kraan Crystal and Muonic Inducer to weaken Doom. Doom is blasted with lightning by Odin, causing him to disappear. Meanwhile, Galactus vows revenge on the heroes who stole from him and plans to destroy Earth.

=== Uatu's epilogue ===
Several optional tasks are available throughout the game. In the game's epilogue, Uatu presents the potential outcomes, regardless of whether the tasks are completed.

- If the player saves the S.H.I.E.L.D. Omega Base computer which contains research data on the Legacy Virus, its information is used to create a cure and stop the plague, saving mutants from extinction. If the player does not, the Legacy Virus runs rampant across Earth, dooming mutants to extinction.
- If the player finds the rare Walek Seaweed in Atlantis which is needed to produce a medicine that will heal Namor, he will grow to trust surface dwellers and join a worldwide organization of superheroes. Otherwise, Krang will usurp the throne from the weakened Namor, convince the Atlantean soldiers to attack the human warships, and use the stolen nuclear missiles to wage war on the surface world.
- If the player locates Senator Kelly in Murderworld and frees him, he will sponsor the Mutant Aid Bill, which supports schools like Professor X's school. If he is not rescued, Kelly will achieve freedom on his own and sponsor a bill that forces all mutants into re-education camps, which brutally forces them to not use their powers.
- If the player saves Nightcrawler from being dropped into the Infinity Vortex, Jean Grey does not die in the Infinity Vortex and returns to Earth in the form of the Dark Phoenix to take vengeance on those who did not save her. If the player saves Grey from being dropped into the Infinity Vortex, Nightcrawler's mother Mystique attacks Professor X out of grief. Professor X is left comatose and dies from his injuries several months later, causing the X-Men to disband.
- If the player finds Valkyrie's sword Dragonfang, Asgard will easily be freed with her aid, Loki will be imprisoned, and Ragnarök never comes to pass. If the player does not find Dragonfang, Valkyrie will die in the battle to free Asgard, Balder will die trying to save her, and Asgard will refuse contact with Earth for a century.
- If the player recovers Volla's ring in Niffleheim, she will warn Odin of an attempt on his life, which will lead to the capture of Surtur in the years to come. If Volla's ring is not recovered, Odin ends up being assassinated, which plunges Asgard into years of conflict. This ends with Thor assuming leadership of Asgard after Sif dies in battle.
- If the player frees Lilandra Neramani from her torture device, the Shi'ar will give Earth advanced technology to treat all disease and hunger and colonize other planets. If Lilandra is not freed, the Shi'ar will ignore the plea of the heroes when an asteroid approaches Earth and their attempt to stop it on their own will result in the Western coast of the United States being obliterated.
- If the player saves the Skrull homeworld from destruction, the Skrulls will form a tentative partnership with Earth and come to their aid when the Kree threaten to enslave humanity. Otherwise, the Skrull and Kree will enter a deadly decades-long war.
- If the player frees Odin from imprisonment at Castle Doom, his intervention will prevent Thanos from enslaving Earth in the near future. If Odin is not freed, he will refuse to aid Thor in battle, causing Thanos to conquer Earth and rule it for centuries before being overthrown.
- If the player finds the damaged Ultimate Nullifier at Castle Doom, Mister Fantastic will repair the Ultimate Nullifier and use it to prevent Mephisto from invading Earth. If the Ultimate Nullifier is not found, the fight with Mephisto will result in mass destruction.

== Characters ==
Marvel: Ultimate Alliance features over 140 Marvel characters, either as playable characters, bosses, or other non-player characters. The primary version of the game developed by Raven Software version features 23 default playable characters, but some systems have additional playable characters not present in other versions. However, the Game Boy Advance version features 10 playable characters and 6 striker characters.

=== Playable characters ===
- Black Panther (Note: Not playable in the Game Boy Advance version)
- Black Widow (Note: Exclusive to the PSP version)
- Blade
- Captain America
- Captain Marvel
- Colossus (Note: Exclusive to the 7th-generation console (PlayStation 3, Xbox 360 and Wii) and the 2016 re-released versions)
- Cyclops (Note: Exclusive to the Xbox 360 Latest Editions and the 2016 re-released versions)
- Daredevil
- Deadpool
- Doctor Doom
- Doctor Strange (Note: Striker in Game Boy Advance version)
- Elektra
- Ghost Rider
- Hawkeye
- Human Torch
- Hulk
- Iceman
- Invisible Woman
- Iron Man
- Luke Cage
- Magneto
- Mister Fantastic
- Moon Knight
- Ms. Marvel
- Namor (Note: Exclusive to Game Boy Advance version)
- Nick Fury
- Nightcrawler
- Jean Grey
- Ronin
- Sabretooth
- Silver Surfer
- Spider-Man
- Spider-Woman
- Storm
- Thing
- Thor
- Venom
- Wolverine

== Development and marketing ==
During early development, Ultimate Alliance was cel shaded.

Most versions of Ultimate Alliance were developed using Vicarious Visions' Alchemy engine, which was purchased from the now-defunct Intrinsic Graphics in May 2003. Raven Software developed the primary version of the game on the PS2, PS3, Xbox and Xbox 360. Vicarious Visions simultaneously ported the game to the PSP, and later to the Wii to coincide with its launch, and Beenox ported the game to Windows. During early development, Ultimate Alliance used cel-shading technology, similar to Raven's previous Marvel Comics games, X-Men Legends and X-Men Legends II: Rise of Apocalypse; however, this was dropped at some point during development. Barking Lizards Technologies used their Whiptail engine to develop the GBA version independently. The game was originally known as Marvel Legends, and had an internal working title of Marvel Comics RPG. At one point, Link from The Legend of Zelda series and Samus Aran from the Metroid series were planned to be playable characters for the Wii version; however, both characters were removed prior to release. These also led a GameCube port to be cancelled, due to the developers using a modified build running on PlayStation 2 hardware to showcase the characters. The music for the game was composed by Mark Griskey, Chance Thomas and Cris Velasco. Over 50 minutes of music was composed by the trio, including gameplay and cutscene tracks.

Marvel: Ultimate Alliance was first released on October 24, 2006, in North America. Regional releases followed throughout 2006 and 2007. The standard edition of Ultimate Alliance was also released as a companion with Forza Motorsport 2 in specially marked Xbox 360 consoles in 2007. The Gold Edition of the game was released on May 22, 2007, exclusively for the Xbox 360. This version included the two DLC packs available at the time. A 2016 version was released for PlayStation 4, Xbox One, and Microsoft Windows on July 26, 2016. In July 2018, the remaster of the game, along with the re-released sequel, were removed due to licensing issues from Activision. The game is currently not available to buy and download from either console or PC marketplaces, unless the user already bought the game.

== Reception and awards ==
Reception

Aggregate scores
Aggregator	Score
GameRankings	XBOX: 83% PC: 83% PS2: 82% X360: 82% PSP: 82% WII: 74% PS3: 78%
Metacritic	XBOX: 83/100; PC: 82/100; PS2: 81/100; X360: 82/100; PSP: 81/100; WII: 73/100; PS3: 78/100

Review scores
Publication	Score
1Up.com	B−
Game Informer	9.25/10
GameSpot	8.3/10
IGN	8.1/10
Official Xbox Magazine (US)	9.0/10

Awards
Publication	Award
GameSpot	Best Use of a Creative License in 2006
Wizard magazine	Video Game of the Year
IGN	Best Story on PlayStation 3 in 2006
Gaming Target	"52 Games We'll Still Be Playing From 2006" selection

Reviews for Raven and Vicarious Visions' version of Marvel Ultimate Alliance received generally favorable reviews from critics. The PlayStation 3 and Xbox 360 versions received 78% and 82% at GameRankings, and 78/100 and 82/100 at Metacritic, respectively. The Windows version received an 83% at GameRankings and 82/100 at Metacritic. GameRankings' scores for the PlayStation 2, PlayStation Portable, Wii and Xbox versions were 82%, 82%, 74%, and 83%, while Metacritic scored those same consoles 81/100, 81/100, 73/100 and 83/100, respectively.

Several reviewers praised the character cast, with 1UP.com's Scott Sharkey stating "even if your favorite character isn't playable, there's a good chance they'll show up at some point through the course of the story as an NPC". GameSpot's Ryan Davis applauded the Xbox 360's graphics, saying that it "features a lot of great lighting, particle, and bump-mapping effects absent from the other versions". He went on to comment: "Even without those advanced graphical effects, the PC and Xbox versions still look pretty sharp". Game Informer thought the game improved upon the "excellent X-Men Legends games from which it was born", giving the game a 9.25/10.

The Game Boy Advance version received the poorest reception. GameSpot thought poorly of the game, calling "uninteresting and sloppy", and rating the game a 2.5/10 "terrible". IGN also disliked the game, giving it a 2.0/10. Reviewer Chris Adams stated: "Everything is awful. From sprites to backgrounds to effects, it shames the Marvel license". Gamer 2.0 gave the game an 8.1/10, however, citing a large number of bonus missions and unlockables as incentive to play.

== Sequel and reboot ==
A sequel to Marvel: Ultimate Alliance was announced by Activision on February 8, 2008. It was released in North America on September 15, 2009, and follows closely the events of the Civil War storyline: an explosion in Stamford, Connecticut caused by Nitro prompts a Superhuman Registration Act. In the game, players are able to choose between the Pro-Registration side, headed by Iron Man, or the Anti-Registration side, headed by Captain America up to the point where the heroes end up uniting against a new common enemy called The Fold.

Marvel Ultimate Alliance 3: The Black Order was announced at The Game Awards on December 6, 2018. The game was developed by Koei Tecmo's Team Ninja and published by Nintendo for Nintendo Switch on July 19, 2019. The game is a reboot of the series, set in a different continuity from the first two games, and involves a team of heroes uniting to prevent Thanos and the Black Order from collecting the Infinity Stones.
