= Llyra =

Marvel Comics fictional character

- Llyra's first appearance.

Publication information
- Publisher: Marvel Comics
- First appearance: Sub-Mariner #32 (December, 1970)
- Created by: Roy Thomas; Sal Buscema

In-story information
- Alter ego: Llyra Morris
- Species: Lemurian mutant
- Team affiliations: Frightful Four
- Partnerships: Ghaur; Set
- Notable aliases: Lady Dorma; Laura Morris
- Abilities: Fully amphibious physiology Superhuman strength Ability to control sea creatures Shape/color shifting

Llyra is a supervillain appearing in American comic books published by Marvel Comics.

== Publication history ==
Llyra first appeared in Sub-Mariner #32 (December, 1970) and was created by Roy Thomas and Sal Buscema.

== Fictional character biography ==
Llyra Morris was born in Hawaii and is the daughter of Llyron, a Homo mermanus from Lemuria, and Rhonda Morris, a human who inherited her father's oceanarium in Hawaii. The two met when Llyron was captured by workers in the employ of Morris, who were looking for marine specimens to exhibit. Morris fell in love with Llyron, and despite the fact that neither could live in the other's environment unaided for very long, they soon were married. Llyron died a few months after they were wed, saving his wife from a shark. The two's daughter, Llyra, is amphibious and a mutant with the ability to alter the color of her skin and hair. As an adult, Llyra travels to Lemuria and seizes the throne from Karthon. Namor defeats Llyra, who is apparently killed in a rockslide.

Using special technology acquired from an undisclosed source, Rhonda Morris resuscitates Llyra. Llyra kidnaps Dorma, Namor's bride-to-be, and use her powers to pose as her. However, the Atlanteans consider the real Dorma to be married to Namor, thwarting Llyra's plot. Llyra flees Atlantis and smashes the cylinder holding Dorma, who suffocates without water to sustain her.

After lying low for a time, Llyra frees the surface criminals Wizard, Sandman, and Trapster from prison to kill Namor. Llyra and these criminals form the new Frightful Four and battle Namor and Spider-Man. Her plot, whereby Namor was supposed to be driven insane by the acquisition of Spider-Man's spider-sense, fails, with Namor taking Llyra to Atlantis to stand trial.

Llyra is broken out of prison by Ghaur and becomes the high priestess of Set, playing a role in the events of Atlantis Attacks. She allied with Ghaur to bring about the reign of Set. However, their attempted sacrifice of seven superhuman females is thwarted. Llyra is teleported away, and the Serpent Crown she had created is buried in a sub-sea fissure.

== Powers and abilities ==
Llyra is a member of the Lemurian branch of the Homo mermanus race. Like all Atlanteans and Lemurians, she possesses a degree of superhuman strength and durability, as well as the ability to breathe underwater and withstand extreme water pressure. Additionally, she can alter the color of her skin and hair and telepathically control sea life.
