= Tiger Shark (Marvel Comics) =

Comic book character

Todd Arliss Tiger Shark
- Tiger Shark as depicted in Villains for Hire #3 (February 2012). Art by Rodolfo Migliari.

Publication information
- Publisher: Marvel Comics
- First appearance: Prince Namor, the Sub-Mariner #5 (September 1968)
- Created by: Roy Thomas (writer); John Buscema (artist)

In-story information
- Alter ego: Todd Arliss
- Species: Human mutate
- Team affiliations: Assassins Guild; Deep Six; Defenders of the Deep; Lethal Legion; Masters of Evil; Offenders
- Notable aliases: Arlys Tigershark
- Abilities: Superhuman strength, speed, stamina, durability, reflexes, and senses; Razor-sharp adamantium teeth; Accelerated swimming speed; Regenerative healing factor

Tiger Shark (Todd Arliss) is a fictional character appearing in American comic books published by Marvel Comics. He is depicted as a supervillain. Created by writer Roy Thomas and artist John Buscema, the character first appeared in Prince Namor, the Sub-Mariner #5 (September 1968). Todd Arliss is a recurring antagonist of the antihero Namor. His powers come from both the DNA of Namor and shark DNA.

== Publication history ==
Todd Arliss debuted in Prince Namor, the Sub-Mariner #5 (September 1968), created by writer Roy Thomas and artist John Buscema. He appeared in the 1977 Ms. Marvel series and the 2018 Avengers series. He appeared in the 2018 Avengers series. He later appears in Wolverine 1988 #19-20. He is a major character in Villains for Hire #1-4. He appears multiple times in the Fear Itself storyline. Tiger Shark appeared in the special issue Marvel Swimsuit Special: Brand New Beach Day.

== Fictional character biography ==
Todd Arliss is a selfish Olympic swimmer who, seeking public acclaim, attempts to rescue a drowning man. In the process, Arliss suffers a spinal cord injury when waves push him into a ship. Desperate to regain his swimming ability, Arliss willingly participates in an experiment by scientist Lemuel Dorcas, who splices his DNA with that of hero Namor and a tiger shark. Although successful, the process changed Arliss both physically and mentally, endowing him with razor-sharp teeth and gills and making him savage and predatory.

Becoming a supervillain and calling himself Tiger Shark, Arliss finds and threatens Lady Dorma, demanding to be crowned Lord of Atlantis. Namor deposes Tiger Shark, who is imprisoned in Atlantis.

Tiger Shark discovers he is losing his powers and teams with Llyra against Namor and his allies Stingray and the Human Torch. Tiger Shark's powers are restored by Llyra, and Tiger Shark accidentally kills Namor's father, Leonard Mackenzie, as the villains retreat. Tiger Shark, Lemuel Dorcas, and Attuma seize the island Hydro-Base and again battle Namor, who allied with Doctor Doom. Dorcas is accidentally crushed to death, with Tiger Shark and Attuma being defeated and imprisoned.

Tiger Shark joins the supervillain team the Masters of Evil who battle the Avengers. With the Masters of Evil, Tiger Shark aids villain Egghead in a plan to ruin Hank Pym, but is ultimately defeated by Pym. Tiger Shark joins Baron Helmut Zemo's version of the Masters of Evil and invades Avengers Mansion, escaping when the Avengers retake their headquarters. Tiger Shark flees with fellow Masters member Whirlwind to California, where they are both captured by Tigra and Hellcat.

After being captured for study and then rescued by Namor, a grateful Tiger Shark renounces crime. Renaming himself Arlys Tigershark, he marries a woman from an undersea tribe of nomads. However, he reverts to his savage ways when his pregnant wife and her tribe are killed by savage undersea creatures called the Faceless Ones.

In Thunderbolts, Tiger Shark mutates into a shark-like being. He joins Crimson Cowl's Masters of Evil and has several skirmishes with maverick superheroes the Thunderbolts.

Tiger Shark — once again in human form — joins Attuma's Deep Six to conquer Atlantis. While initially successful, the villains are eventually defeated, with Tiger Shark quickly defeated by the Silver Surfer.

During the 2008 "Secret Invasion" storyline, Ms. Marvel saves Tiger Shark from being killed by a Super-Skrull. Later on, the Grandmaster recruits Tiger Shark into the Offenders in a bid to thwart the Hulk. Tiger Shark joins a new version of the Lethal Legion, led by the Grim Reaper, during the 2008 storyline "Dark Reign".

During the 2011 "Fear Itself" storyline, Tiger Shark joins Attuma, Tyrak, and Aradnea in taking over New Atlantis. As Namor and his allies fight off Attuma's forces and the Undying Ones, Tiger Shark attacks Loa.

Tiger Shark attacks a cruise ship which Stingray and Diane Newell are on. Namor breaks up the fight and demands their allegiance. After Namor attacks Stingray, Tiger Shark reluctantly takes up Namor's offer and joins his Defenders of the Deep.

== Powers and abilities ==
Before gaining his powers, Todd Arliss was a record-breaking Olympic swimmer but otherwise an ordinary human. After going through Via Lemuel Dorcas' experimental genetic engineering process, he got transformed into an amphibious humanoid with the traits of a human, an Atlantean (Homo mermanus), and a tiger shark. As Tiger Shark, he possesses the same superhuman strength, stamina, water speed and durability compared to Namor, although he must be immersed in water to achieve his full strength as he weakens outside of the water. On land, he must wear his special costume containing a water circulation system which bathes him with a thin layer of water, to retain his strength. Tiger Shark also possesses an innate hunting instinct inherited from his shark genes, as once he locks onto prey he cannot stop tracking it until it has been captured or he has been forcibly repulsed. He has the ability to survive indefinitely underwater via gills on his cheeks and has razor-pointed adamantium teeth. Tiger Shark gained the tenuous ability to shift between a more monstrous shark form and his humanoid state, either given to him by the thieves' guild or something he grew into over his criminal career. This vastly increased his physical abilities due to excess bulk and muscle mass, and he even gained a healing factor powerful enough to regenerate damaged brain tissue over time.

== Reception ==
Nicholas Brooks of Comic Book Resources described Tiger Shark as a classic aquatic character.

He was ranked 80 in a comic book readers top 100 marvel villains

Darby Harness on Screen rant ranked him as one of Namor’s most powerful villains in a list made in the lead up of Wakanda Forever.

In his appearance in Villains for Hire #1 he is critiqued for the art, and how it isn't that good with him as the star character.

== Other versions ==
- An alternate universe version of Tiger Shark from Earth-295 appears in Exiles #61. This version is a creation of Dark Beast, who hides his existence from Mister Sinister and Apocalypse.
- An alternate universe version of Tiger Shark from Earth-1610 appears in Ultimate Fantastic Four #60. This version possesses a more shark-like appearance.
- In the alternate reality of the 2008 Marvel Apes miniseries, Tiger Shark is a gorilla named Tigorilla.

== In other media ==
=== Television ===
- Tiger Shark appears in The Avengers: United They Stand episode "Command Decision", voiced by Tony Daniels. This version is a member of Helmut Zemo's Masters of Evil.
- Tiger Shark appears in the Avengers Assemble episode "Shadow of Atlantis", voiced by Matthew Mercer. This version is a former general working under Attuma who rebelled against Atlantis in protest of the treaty between his homeland and the surface world and joined the Shadow Council.
- Tiger Shark appears in Marvel Disk Wars: The Avengers, voiced by Tarusuke Shingaki in the Japanese version and by Patrick Seitz in the English dub.

=== Miscellaneous ===
- Tiger Shark appears as a boss in Marvel Avengers Academy.
- Tiger Shark appears as a boss in Marvel: Ultimate Alliance, voiced by Beau Weaver. This version is a member of Doctor Doom's Masters of Evil.
- In 2015, Hasbro released an action figure of Tiger Shark in the Ant-Man Ultron series as part of the Marvel Legends action figure line.
