= Krang (Marvel Comics) =

- Krang from The Last Defenders #3. Art by Jim Muniz.

Publication information
- Publisher: Marvel Comics
- First appearance: Fantastic Four Annual #1 (1963)
- Created by: Stan Lee (writer); Jack Kirby (artist)

In-story information
- Full name: Krang
- Species: Homo mermanus
- Place of origin: Atlantis
- Team affiliations: Defenders; Serpent Squad
- Partnerships: Attuma; Byrrah; Lemuel Dorcas; Puppet Master; Orka; Subcommander Selach
- Notable aliases: Warlord Krang
- Abilities: Ability to breathe underwater; Wields electric sword; Skilled strategist; Expert fencer

Krang is a character appearing in American comic books published by Marvel Comics. Created by writer Stan Lee and artist Jack Kirby, the character first appeared in Fantastic Four Annual #1 (1963). An Atlantean military leader, Krang has alternated between being an ally and an adversary of Namor. Over the years, he has repeatedly attempted to usurp Namor's throne during the latter's absences, only to be later reinstated in his service. His characterization has gradually evolved, with later appearances presenting him in a more ambiguous, antiheroic light. In some storylines, he has even allied with Namor and joined the superhero team, the Defenders.

== Publication history ==
Krang debuted in Fantastic Four Annual #1 (1963), created by Stan Lee and Jack Kirby. He subsequently appeared in several Marvel series, including Tales to Astonish (1959), Daredevil (1964), and King in Black: Namor (2021).

== Fictional character biography ==
Krang was born in Atlantis City, Atlantis. He became a leader of the Atlantean military and warlord of Atlantis who rose to prominence during the time in which Namor, the Prince of Atlantis was missing. Upon Namor's return, Krang's bride-to-be, the Lady Dorma, deserted him for Namor, bringing a great hatred for Namor from Krang. Shortly thereafter, when Namor attempted to conquer New York City, he made Krang his second in command. However, the Fantastic Four fought off the first attack and Namor stopped the invasion in order to save Sue Storm of the Fantastic Four. Feeling that Namor had betrayed his own people to save an enemy, Krang was even more angered and after the Atlanteans left Atlantis he seized control and usurped the throne of Atlantis from Namor. Krang imprisoned Namor, and forced the Prince to prove himself on a quest to find Neptune's trident, made additionally difficult by traps set by Krang. Meanwhile, Krang plotted a conquest of the surface world, ruled Atlantis as a despot, and put down a revolt against his rule. When Namor returned, he defeated Krang in personal combat. Krang was dethroned and exiled.

Krang, now a professional criminal, through the Puppet Master, set the Behemoth against Namor. While Namor was busy, Krang returned to Atlantis and tricked Lady Dorma into renewing their engagement and accompanying him to the surface world, as well as tricking Namor into believing that she had betrayed him and left willingly. Fleeing to the surface world with Dorma he would come into conflict with the armored avenger Iron Man, and fomented a battle between Namor and Iron Man. In a battle with Krang, Namor was inflicted with temporary amnesia. Krang used Atlantean technology to create a tidal wave in Manhattan. However Namor finally recovered, capturing Krang and defeating him in personal combat. Namor imprisoned him, exiling him once more. When Namor's evil cousin Byrrah seized the throne of Atlantis and invited Krang back to enjoy his former position, Krang formed an alliance with Byrrah and Attuma. This however was short-lived and soon Krang was forced to flee yet again when Byrrah's scheme failed.

After this he would attempt to steal the Serpent Crown, a powerful object, which would make him nearly invincible. These efforts however were thwarted by Namor and Captain America (who called himself Nomad at the time). Krang was driven fully insane. When Namor spent much time on the surface world allied with Doctor Doom, Krang once more seized control of Atlantis. Stealing the Trumpet Horn of Namor, he summoned the great beast Gargantus, to defeat the returning Namor, but it was soundly defeated by the Prince, while Doom beat Krang within an inch of his life with a neuro-shock blade.

Sometime later, after altering his physiology through the technological means of Wundagore Mountain, Krang is recruited into the Defenders.

== Powers and abilities ==
As an Atlantean, Krang possesses the enhanced strength, speed, and endurance characteristic of his species, as well as the ability to breathe underwater. He also possesses gills, enhanced vision, and resistance to cold and pressure. Initially unable to remain out of water without a special serum, Krang eventually modified his body to maintain this ability naturally. He is also regarded as one of the most skilled martial artists in Atlantis and is proficient with a wide range of weaponry. Among his preferred arms is the neuro-shock blade, an electrically charged sword capable of delivering lethal strikes underwater.

== Other versions ==
An alternate universe variant of Krang from Earth-58163 appears in Civil War: House of M #3.

== In other media ==
=== Television ===
- Krang appears in the "Sub-Mariner" segment of The Marvel Super Heroes, voiced by Paul Kligman.
- Krang appears in the Fantastic Four episode "Now Comes the Sub-Mariner", voiced by Neil Ross.

=== Video games ===
Krang appears as a mini-boss in Marvel: Ultimate Alliance, voiced by Fred Tatasciore. This version is a member of Doctor Doom's Masters of Evil and a cousin of Byrrah.
