= Namor =

Marvel Comics character

Namor the Sub-Mariner
- Namor taken from the variant cover of Inhumans vs. X-Men #4 (February 2017). Originally drawn by Sal Buscema for the corner box of the comic book series Sub-Mariner (1968 -1974) and painted over by Joe Jusko for the cover.

Publication information
- Publisher: Marvel Comics
- First appearance: Motion Picture Funnies Weekly #1 (uncirculated); Marvel Comics #1 (October 1939)
- Created by: Bill Everett

In-story information
- Full name: Namor McKenzie
- Species: Human mutant / Atlantean hybrid
- Place of origin: Atlantis
- Team affiliations: Avengers; All-Winners Squad; The Cabal; Dark X-Men; Defenders; Defenders of the Deep; Deep Six; Fantastic Four; Heroes for Hire/Oracle, Inc.; Illuminati; Invaders; The Order; Phoenix Five; X-Men
- Partnerships: Namorita; Namora; Dorma
- Notable aliases: The Avenging Son; The Sub-Mariner; Namor the First; King of Atlantis
- Abilities: Superhuman strength, speed, durability, agility, senses, and reflexes; Marine life empathy, telepathy, and control; Resistance to extreme temperatures; Flight via wings on his ankles; Extended longevity; Aquatic adaptation; Electric shock; Hydrokinesis; Echolocation

Namor McKenzie (/ˈneɪmɔːr/), also known as the Namor the Sub-Mariner, is a character appearing in American comic books published by Marvel Comics. Created by writer-artist Bill Everett for comic book packager Funnies Inc., the character first appeared in Motion Picture Funnies Weekly #1 (uncirculated). Namor first appeared publicly in Marvel Comics #1 (cover-dated October 1939). It was the first comic book from Timely Comics, the 1930s–1940s predecessor of Marvel Comics. During that period, known to historians and fans as the Golden Age of Comic Books, the Sub-Mariner was one of Timely's top three characters, along with Captain America and the original Human Torch. Moreover, Namor has also been described as the first comic book antihero.

The mutant son of a human sea captain and a princess of the mythical undersea kingdom of Atlantis, Namor possesses the superstrength and aquatic abilities of the Homo mermanus race, as well as the mutant ability of flight, along with other superhuman powers. Throughout the years he has been portrayed as an antihero, alternating between a good-natured but short-fused superhero, and a hostile invader seeking vengeance for perceived wrongs that misguided surface-dwellers committed against his kingdom. A historically important and relatively popular Marvel character, Namor has served directly with the Avengers, the Fantastic Four, the Invaders, the Defenders, the X-Men and the Illuminati as well as serving as a foil to them on occasion.

Tenoch Huerta Mejía portrays Namor in the Marvel Cinematic Universe (MCU) films Black Panther: Wakanda Forever (2022) and the upcoming Avengers: Doomsday (2026).

== Publication history ==
=== Creation ===
Namor was created by writer-artist Bill Everett. The character first appeared in April 1939 in the prototype for a planned giveaway comic titled Motion Picture Funnies Weekly, which was produced by the comic book packager Funnies Inc. The only eight known samples among those created to send to theater owners were discovered in the estate of the deceased publisher in 1974. Allegedly, Everett created Namor because he was informed that Carl Burgos had created the Human Torch, who can manipulate fire, and he wanted to play on the notion of "fire and water". His interest in "anything nautical, [and having] to do with the sea", also factored in Namor's creation and origin.

Everett stated that the inspiration for creating the character was Samuel Taylor Coleridge's poem The Rime of the Ancient Mariner (1798), and came up with "Namor" by writing down noble-sounding names backwards and thought Roman / Namor looked the best. He described the character as an "ultra-man of the deep [who] lives on land and in the sea, flies in the air, [and] has the strength of a thousand [surface] men".

=== 1930s, 1940s, and 1950s ===
Namor's first cover appearance: Marvel Mystery Comics #4 (Feb. 1940). Art by Alex Schomburg.

When the giveaway idea with Motion Picture Funnies Weekly fell through, Everett used the character for Marvel Comics #1 (October 1939), the first comic book by Funnies, Inc. client Timely Comics, predecessor of Marvel Comics. The final panel of the earlier, unpublished eight-page Sub-Mariner story had included a "Continued Next Week" box that reappeared, sans lettering, in an expanded 12-page story.

In his first appearances, Namor was an enemy of the United States. Comics historian Les Daniels notes that

Namor was a freak in the service of chaos. Although the Sub-Mariner acted like a villain, his cause had some justice, and readers reveled in his assaults on civilization. His enthusiastic fans weren't offended by the carnage he created as he wrecked everything from ships to skyscrapers."

In 1940, Everett's antihero battles Carl Burgos' android superhero, the Human Torch, when Namor threatens to sink the island of Manhattan underneath a tidal wave.

When the U.S. entered World War II, Namor would aid the Allies of World War II against Adolf Hitler and the Axis powers. Supporting characters included Betty Dean, a New York City policewoman introduced in Marvel Mystery Comics #3 (January 1940) (and later known as Betty Dean-Prentiss), who was a steady companion, and his cousins Namora and Dorma.

Namor starred in the Golden Age comic book Sub-Mariner, published quarterly, then thrice-yearly, and finally bimonthly, from issues #1–32 (Fall 1941–June 1949). A backup feature each issue starred the detective-superhero the Angel. Along with many other Timely characters, Namor disappeared a few years into the aftermath of World War II due to the decline in popularity of superhero comics. He briefly fought crime as a member of the post-war superhero team the All-Winners Squad, built around the core of Namor, Captain America, and the original Human Torch. The Sub-Mariner experienced a brief revival in the mid-1950s at Atlas Comics, the 1950s iteration of Marvel. Along with Captain America and the original Human Torch, he was revived in Young Men #24. Soon afterward, Sub-Mariner was revived with issues #33–42 (April 1954 – Oct. 1955). During this time, Namora had her own spin-off series. A planned live-action television program starring Namor did not appear and the revival of the comic book series was cancelled a second time.

=== 1960s ===
Namor returned in Fantastic Four #4 (May 1962), where a member of the titular superhero team, Johnny Storm, the new Human Torch, discovers him living as an amnesiac homeless man in the Bowery section of Manhattan. Storm helps him recover his memory, and Namor immediately returns to his undersea kingdom—later identified as Atlantis in Fantastic Four Annual #1 (June 1963). Finding it destroyed from nuclear testing, Namor assumes his people are scattered and that he will never find them. He again becomes an antihero during this period, as two elements – a thirst for vengeance and a quest for identity – would dominate the Sub-Mariner stories of the 1960s. He was both a villain and a hero – striking against the human race who destroyed his home, but showing a great deal of noblesse oblige to individuals.

In X-Men #6 (July 1964), X-Men leader Professor X and antagonist Magneto each suspect Namor is a mutant and make efforts to recruit him. Namor's revival was a hit with readers, but Marvel could not give him his own title due to publication and distribution restrictions that would not be lifted until 1968. Instead, Namor was given numerous guest-appearances, including the story "In Mortal Combat with... Sub-Mariner!" featured in Daredevil #7 (April 1965), drawn by Wally Wood. He was also a starring feature in the split-title comic Tales to Astonish (beginning issue #70, Aug. 1965). By now, during a period fans and historians call the Silver Age of Comic Books, he is more authoritative, arrogant and solemn than the impetuous youthful character of the 1940s and mid-1950s, speaking in neo-Shakespearean dialogue rather than the more colloquial speech of his youth, often shouting his battle cry, "Imperius Rex!". The character was spun off into his own title, Sub-Mariner, in 1968. The super-villain Tiger Shark was introduced in issue #5 (September 1968) by writer Roy Thomas and artist John Buscema and the super-hero Stingray in issue #19 (November 1969) by Thomas and Bill Everett. The Avengers #71 (December 1969) establishes that Namor was part of the Invaders, a retcon of his 1940s appearances that presents him as a member of a team of heroes who fought alongside the Allies of World War II, along with Captain America, Bucky Barnes, and the original Human Torch.

=== 1970s ===
Later issues of this Sub-Mariner series are notable for having been written and drawn by the character's creator, Bill Everett, shortly before his death; as well, they reintroduced a now-older Namora, and introduced her daughter, Namorita Prentiss. By now more of a reluctant superhero "the Sub-Mariner was perfect for the Marvel Age of angst-ridden protagonists. Noble yet misunderstood, powerful yet thwarted ... [he was] portrayed as a regal monarch – a king without a country." The final issue, #72 (Sept. 1974), was written by Steve Skeates and featured an unofficial intercompany crossover with the last issue of DC Comics' Aquaman series. A five- to six-page backup feature, "Tales of Atlantis", chronicling the undersea kingdom from its ancient origins, appeared in issues #62–66 (June–Oct. 1973), written by Steve Gerber, with penciling by Howard Chaykin and later Jim Mooney. After the cancellation of Sub-Mariner, Namor co-starred with Doctor Doom in the Super-Villain Team-Up series. The series suffered from mediocre sales due to its lack of a stable creative team, and following issue #13 (August 1977) Namor was dropped from the co-star spot.

=== 1980s and 1990s ===
Marvel published a four-issue miniseries in 1984, Prince Namor, the Sub-Mariner (September–December), by scripter/co-plotter J. M. DeMatteis, penciler/co-plotter Bob Budiansky, and inker Danny Bulanadi. The 12-issue maxiseries The Saga of the Sub-Mariner (Nov. 1988 – Oct. 1989) provided a retrospective of Namor's past adventures while tying up loose plot threads and resolving contradictions that had accumulated over the character's decades of published history. Namor again received an ongoing series in 1990. Namor, the Sub-Mariner, which ran 62 issues (April 1990 – May 1995), was initially written and penciled by John Byrne who took over the inking as well from issues #4–21. Unlike all of Namor's previous series, the cover logo emphasized the character's name rather than the "Sub-Mariner" epithet. From #26–38, the series' penciler and eventual penciler-inker was then-newcomer Jae Lee, with Bob Harras scripting from #33–40. After three fill-in issues, the remainder of the series was written by Glenn Herdling and pencilled by Geof Isherwood. This series followed Namor as CEO of Oracle, Inc., a corporation devoted to reducing pollution, particularly in the oceans, and provided the stage for the return of the 1970s martial artist superhero Iron Fist, who had been presumed dead. Whereas J. M. DeMatteis saw his series as an opportunity to explore Namor much more deeply than he had been able to in the team book The Defenders, John Byrne felt that the character did not work well outside of a group context and accordingly gave Namor, the Sub-Mariner a massive supporting cast.

=== 2000s and after ===
The 12-issue miniseries Namor (June 2003–May 2004), credited to co-writers Bill Jemas (then Marvel's president) and Andi Watson, and penciled initially by Salvador Larroca and later by Pat Olliffe and others, explored Namor's youth, charting his teenage romance with a young American girl in the early 20th century. A six-issue miniseries, Sub-Mariner vol. 2 (Aug. 2007 – Jan. 2008), by co-writers Matt Cherniss and Peter Johnson and, primarily, artist Phil Briones, introduced Namor's heretofore undisclosed son, Kamar. Namor was featured in his own ongoing series, Namor: The First Mutant, in 2011. The series was cancelled after less than a year into its publication. Namor has also served alongside, or even as a member of, superhero teams – most notably the Defenders, which included Doctor Strange, the Hulk, and the Silver Surfer. Other groups he was associated with included the Avengers; and both the World War II and modern-day versions of the Invaders. Marvel revived The Defenders, with Namor on the team, in December 2011. The series was cancelled after 12 issues. He became one of the main characters, along with the other Illuminati members, in the third volume of New Avengers beginning in 2013. He appeared in the 2018 Namor: The Best Defense one-shot. Namor then headlined an eight issue run written by Jason Aaron titled Namor: The Last King of Atlantis which ran from 2024-2025.

== Fictional character biography ==
=== Early life ===
Namor was born in the capital city of the Atlantean empire, then located under the Antarctic ice pack. His mother was Emperor Thakorr's daughter, Fen, and his father an American sea captain, Leonard McKenzie, of the icebreaker Oracle; they had fallen in love and married aboard ship while she was, unbeknownst to him, spying on the human intruders. When Fen did not return, Atlantean warriors attacked the Oracle, evidently killing Captain McKenzie, and returned Fen to her kingdom. The pink-skinned mutant Namor was subsequently born among the blue-skinned Atlanteans. He became the Prince of Atlantis, and a warrior for his people against the "surface-dwellers".

At some point, when Namor was a child, the people of Atlantis relocated and built a new kingdom near the Pacific Northwest. There, Namor would befriend a young girl named Sandy Pierce, the daughter of wealthy businessman Henry Pierce. During this time, Namor would also meet his cousin Namora, who was named after him. Years later as a teenager, Namor would reconnect with Sandy, revealing his identity to her and starting a relationship. Due to oil leaking from the ground into Atlantis, and Sandy's father facing financial ruin due to problems with his oil rig, Namor struck a deal with Henry to help each other out. In an attempt to discredit Namor in the eyes of the Atlanteans, his cousin Beemer first attacked Sandy and her father and destroyed the oil rig. With the oil threatening to poison them, the Atlanteans had to relocate back to the South Pacific Ocean. Sandy decided to join them, but would disappear. When Namor was a teenager, he witnessed the Chasm People's Swift Tide in combat practice until his royal cousin Dorma arrived. He even witnesses a meeting between Atlantis and the Chasm People where he has his first encounter with Prince Attuma. When Chasm People appear to take on the Imperial Atlanteans and the traitorous Swift Tide, Namor and Dorma are awestruck of the Swift Tide's fighting skills as they and Attuma assist in the battle. The Swift Tide is sent to retrieve a dark artifact called the Unforgotten Stone.

=== World War II ===
In 1939, Namor became friends with New York City policewoman Betty Dean, who pleaded with him to help the Allies' effort against the Axis powers during World War II. Despite originally denying her pleas, and attacking New York on multiple occasions due to their provocations, Namor decided to join the Allies' cause against the Nazis in September 1940. After the attack on Pearl Harbor and the US officially joining the war in 1941, Namor formed superhero team the Invaders, alongside Captain America, Bucky, the original Human Torch, and Toro. In 1944, Namor and the Invaders would go to Wakanda, where they encountered T'Chaka, the king and Black Panther of the nation. Namor would later find both contention and companionship in youthful monarch T'Challa. The pair of kings would briefly work together to track down traitors and enemies along with missing subjects of their respective kingdoms for a time. Succeeding in their mission, Namor and T'Challa would part on friendly terms afterwards, the former being dismayed after hearing of his land-born counterpart's opening suzerainties to the rest of the world later on.

While investigating an assault on Atlantis, Namor fell under the control of Paul Destine, bearer of the Serpent Crown, who bade him to fly to New York and wander without his memories until he was summoned. In his amnesiac state, he met the daughter of friend and fellow World War II veteran Randall Peterson, Nay Peterson, who recognized him and took him back to her family home. Namor spent years living with the Petersons, slowly recovering his memories, until he was approached by Professor Charles Xavier and joined him in search of fellow mutants. His travels with Xavier revealed Namor's emotional imbalance due to wartime PTSD. In an attempt to heal Namor's mental trauma, Xavier created a persona based on his memories of Thomas Machan, another war buddy Namor had failed to save, hoping that Machan could act as therapist for him. When confronted with the presence of his dead friend, Namor instead suffered a mental break and fled, succumbing to Destine's command once more. Xavier's intervention would solidify the bipolar disorder he would suffer from for decades to come.

=== The Fantastic Four and modern world ===
He was later found by Johnny Storm in Fantastic Four #4 living in the flophouse Bowery district of Manhattan as an amnesiac derelict. Regaining his memory, he became enraged upon learning that his people's city had been destroyed by nuclear testing, its inhabitants evacuated. Namor vows revenge on humanity, but after several attacks thwarted by superheroes, including in Fantastic Four #6, 9, and 14 (Sept. and Dec. 1962, May 1963), Strange Tales #107 (April 1963), he finds his people and launches an unsuccessful invasion of New York City in Fantastic Four Annual #1 (1963).

Sub-Mariner #67 (Nov. 1973), introducing the short-lived mid-1970s costume. Cover art by John Romita and Mike Esposito.

Namor's experience with the Fantastic Four leads to a long-running romantic triangle for Namor, Sue Storm, and Reed Richards. Namor becomes obsessed with Sue, who finds him dangerously attractive.

Prior to Namor's first battle with the Avengers, he comes across a group of Inuit worshiping a figure frozen in ice; someone whom the Sub-Mariner vaguely recognizes from the past just before hurling the monolith into the ocean during an outburst of rage. After his second bout with the Avengers he is approached by then-ally in the war turned adversary in modern times; Captain Steven Rogers, the two catching up about life and times. Namor returns to Atlantis to marry his royal cousin Lady Dorma. In Sub-Mariner #37 (May 1971), the evil princess Llyra of Lemuria, another undersea culture, kidnaps and replaces Dorma at the wedding, hoping to usurp Namor's kingdom. Though Namor's marriage to Dorma is still official, she dies as a result of Llyra's machinations. In issues #45–46 (Nov.-Dec. 1971) Namor finally meets his father, long thought dead, only to lose him when Leonard McKenzie gives his life in battle against the supervillain Tiger Shark. Namor allies with the "non-team" the Defenders initially in Marvel Feature #1–3, Dec. 1971 – June 1972, then in the series The Defenders. After being deposed from his throne, Namor joins the superhero team the Avengers. He is briefly married to Marrina, an aquatic alien and a member of the Canadian super-team Alpha Flight. She is later presumed killed, but she is later revealed to be in a coma, of which Namor is unaware.

Father-daughter oceanographers Caleb and Carrie Alexander, theorizing that Namor's propensity toward rage is due to his half-human half-Atlantean blood chemistry, equip Namor with a monitor to warn when he has to seek either air or water. This allows Namor to control his metabolism. He collects sunken treasures to finance his secret purchase of a corporation he renames Oracle Inc., which he turns to conservation and environmental purposes. Unbeknownst to the Sub-Mariner, the Machan guilt apparition would secretly influence his actions, leading him to turn willing Atlantean soldiers human for the purpose of infiltrating governments. Later, Namor loses his ankle-wings during a battle with the animated garbage-monster Sluj, but they are later restored. Namor travels to the dimension of K'un-L'un, where he finds and retrieves the superhero Iron Fist, who had been presumed dead. Namor reclaims the throne of Atlantis, and Oracle begins sponsoring the charitable super-group Heroes for Hire. In the one-shot New Avengers: Illuminati (May 2006), Namor is revealed to have been a member for several years of the clandestine policy group the Illuminati, with Mister Fantastic, Iron Man, Doctor Strange, Professor X, and Black Bolt. In the series Sub-Mariner vol. 2 #1–6 (Aug. 2007–Jan. 2008), he discovers his long-lost son Kamar, who attempts to usurp the throne of Atlantis but is killed by the supervillain Nitro.

During the "Dark Reign" storyline, Namor joins Norman Osborn's Cabal following the "Secret Invasion" storyline. In 2011, Namor joined the mutant superhero team the X-Men. Namor appeared in the Curse of the Mutants, and Avengers vs. X-Men events before joining the Illuminati and All-New Invaders. That same year, during the "Fear Itself" storyline, Namor is ousted from his kingdom by Attuma, who was transformed into Nerkodd, Breaker of Oceans. Namor assists the X-Men, who have relocated to Utopia, off the coast of San Francisco, and sides with them during the subsequent war with the Avengers over the coming of the Phoenix Force to Earth. He becomes one of the Phoenix Five when the Phoenix Force is fractured between himself, Cyclops, Emma Frost, Colossus, and Magik. He eventually becomes the first of the Phoenix Five to fall. Namor rejoins the Illuminati, but believing the group's morality holds it back, he assembles a new group, the Cabal, to deal with interdimensional incursions. Namor and the Cabal eventually escape to another Earth, this one in the Ultimate Universe. The new Squadron Supreme decapitates Namor in retaliation for the worlds destroyed by the Cabal, but this is undone through time travel.

During the "Secret Empire" storyline, Captain America puts Namor into a position where he is forced to sign a peace treaty that for a time enabled Hydra to access a fragment of the Cosmic Cube stored in Atlantis. In reality, Namor secretly aids the Underground resistances against Hydra, after finding Winter Soldier falling to the sea out of nowhere and cover his track from Hydra by disguising him as his bodyguard, having had realized that the Steve Rogers-Captain America he and his fellow resistances saw now is not the man they once knew. Once Captain America returns and gives hope to his fellow heroes to find the Cosmic Cube fragments before Hydra does, Namor tells Winter Soldier that the time has come to remove the latter's disguise and help their fellow allies against Hydra, and returning the real Steve Rogers they knew.

=== Marvel Legacy & Fresh Start (2017–present) ===
==== X-Men Red and West Coast Avengers ====
Sometime after the fall of the Hydra-controlled United States, Jean Grey of the X-Men implores Namor's backing for a new mutant nation. He lends the support of Atlantis to her cause and works with his fellow mutants in the battle against Cassandra Nova as she manipulates national powers against mutants on a global scale, once more donning the colors of X to resist a nanorobotic sentinel attack. Relapsing into his human-hating ways, Namor goes back to concocting war plans against the surface nations of the world. When Professor Charles Xavier offers Namor sanctuary in the new mutant nation of Krakoa, the somber monarch refuses Xavier's request on the grounds that neither Xavier nor the mutant nation actually believed themselves to be superior to those from whom they had finally separated themselves, and demands that Xavier not contact him until Xavier believes in his own supremacy. Elsewhere, in Los Angeles, while explaining her backstory to Gwen Poole, Ramone Watts implies that both she and her brother Johnny "Fuse" Watts are children of Namor, born to exiled Dora Milaje Zobae.

==== Forming the Defenders of the Deep ====
Namor crashes Tiger Shark's battle with Stingray, nearly killing Stingray and intimidating Tiger Shark into swearing his allegiance. Tiger Shark is drafted into the Defenders of the Deep, along with Orka, Andromeda, Echidna, the Piranhas, Fathom Five members Bloodtide and Manowar, and King Crab, in order to protect the oceans just as the Avengers protect the land. They encounter the Avengers, where Captain America voices his disappointment in Namor for nearly killing Stingray. Their fight is interrupted by the Winter Guard who are also after the Defenders of the Deep. In the ensuing chaos, the Defenders escape after the sea king makes an example of some piranha men. After battling cybernetically augmented dolphins sent by Roxxon, Namor sits brooding in an undersea tavern, musing on the decline of his kingdom and repeated aggression from the surface world, and considering giving in to the hunger for war. The bartender suggests he focus his strength against the Wakandan-led Avengers, pointing out the many potential allies among the Avengers' enemies. Unbeknownst to Namor, the bartender is an agent of Mephisto. Taking the bartender's words to heart, Namor uses his lingering psychic link with the Phoenix Force to summon it back to Earth, promising to set galaxies ablaze in exchange for the power to defeat the Avengers.

==== The Best Defense ====
Leaving the Defenders of the Deep to protect Hydropolis, the Sub-Mariner seeks out a long defected splinter sect of Atlanteans known as the Vodani. Namor attempts to forge an alliance by joining with the king's daughter, Kataw, to vanquish an ancient monster, but this turns out to be a ruse by the Vodani king Okun to leave him vulnerable, the Vodani having grown to despise what they see as impure Atlanteans. Namor flings himself at Okun, hoping to surface and use his airbreathing abilities to gain the upper hand, but realizes that the tunnel he passed through to reach the Vodani was in fact a portal to another world, and he has unwittingly cast them both into the vacuum of space, where he is only saved by the unexpected intervention of the Silver Surfer. Namor, in conjunction with his colleagues in the Defenders, battles against Nebulon, a demon-empowered entity who has hijacked a cosmic train that burns planets as fuel, and has directed it to Vodan and ultimately towards Earth. Doctor Strange and Hulk manage to rescue Vodan from the furnace, instead sending it into the freezing void of space. Namor offers to let Kataw use her electricity redirection powers to siphon his bioelectric life force and give the Silver Surfer enough power to save the planet, a sacrifice he is willing to make as king. Furious at his arrogance after killing her father, she sacrifices her own life instead. After being exiled from their world, Namor acknowledges to the Silver Surfer that his offer was an attempt to undermine Kataw's rule and force an alliance, but his arrogance has cost yet another life.

==== Invaders ====
Namor prepares for war accompanied by his advisor Machan, who appears to be a blue-skinned Atlantean with the same abilities of flight and air-breathing as Namor. It soon becomes clear that Machan only exists in Namor's mind, and is in fact the psychic entity based on Thomas Machan that Xavier implanted in his mind years before. Namor developed hydrokinesis in order to get a branch of the Atlanteans called the Sea Blades to swear their allegiance with him. In addition to incarcerating the criminal Hydro-Man to siphon his hydrokinetic powers which explained how Namor got the Sea Blades to side with him, Atlantean technicians have been fabricating a bomb to target human DNA. When Captain America tries to broker peace, he is violently beaten by Namor and told that next time there will be no mercy.

Namor utilizes the Genus Compound, a biochemical weapon, to transform humans into Homo mermanus. During his time travelling with Professor X, Namor witnessed the police gun down a mutant called Genus, who had the ability to transform animals from one species to another, and used Genus' recovered corpse as the basis for his weapon. When Roxxon mercenaries steal the Genus Compound, Namor is exposed to a variant used to turn Atlantean spies into humans and loses his powers. He ends up stranded on a seemingly deserted island along with Captain America. Powerless, Namor takes responsibility for everything Machan has done, whereas Steve insists on Namor's fundamental goodness. Captain America uses the original Genus Compound to restore Namor's Atlantean powers. Captain America and Namor reunite with the rest of the Invaders to prevent Machan from unleashing the Omega Sea.

==== Atlantis Attacks ====
Namor invades the portal city of Pan to demand the return of Atlantis' sacred guardian dragon, which the Big Nguyen Company has stolen in order to power the city's portal technology. The New Agents of Atlas negotiate a truce between Namor and Pan, with Namor being particularly impressed by Wave due to her recent role in defeating the Sirenas, longtime enemies of Atlantis. The Agents successfully develop a new power source to prevent Pan's citizens from being displaced, and the dragon is safely returned to Atlantis, but abruptly goes berserk upon arrival and attacks the underwater city.

Atlantean scientists discover an implant embedded in the dragon's scales. Namor flies to Pan for revenge, but Big Nguyen Company's CEO and Pan founder Mike Nguyen reveals that he has recruited the Sirenas to defend Pan from attack. Namor defeats Brawn and is about to strike the final blow, but is overpowered by the Sirenas and imprisoned. Nguyen proposes all-out war with Atlantis, while Namora discovers that the implant on the dragon was Sirena tech, splitting the heroes' loyalties. Namor breaks free from his restraints and threatens to destroy the entire city upon realizing that Ngyuen has sent a force of Sirenas to attack Atlantis. Nguyen, via hologram, warns of civilian casualties and instead proposes a triple alliance between Pan, Atlantis and the Sirenas; Namor refuses and resumes battle with the remaining Agents.

Brawn talks down the combatants, having hacked Ngyuen's mainframe, and confronts Atlas founder Jimmy Woo for withholding secrets from the team. Woo reveals that for thousands of years, dragons have served as advisors for human rulers, using humans as proxies in their conflicts with one another, making them responsible for almost every major war in history. The Atlas Foundation itself is run by a dragon, Mr. Lao. Nguyen intends to unite the world under Pan, proposing to Namor and Woo that by harvesting the combined power of their dragons, they can claim the rest of them. Namor instead returns to Atlantis where Wave brokers a truce with the Sirenas, while Brawn and the other Agents confront Nguyen in his personal bunker. Nguyen attaches a Sirena implant to Amadeus, forcing Brawn to attack Namor. With the encouragement of Woo and Namor, Brawn breaks free and creates another shockwave to stop a tsunami that he had caused. One month later, Woo announces that Atlantis and the Sirenas have signed a non-aggression pact, recognizing Pan as an independent nation.

==== Enter the Phoenix ====
After the Phoenix Force makes its nest near Avengers Mountain in the North Pole, Namor attempts to reunite with the entity, leading to a clash between the Avengers and the Defenders of the Deep. During the battle, the Phoenix decides to hold a tournament to decide who its next host will be and selects Namor as a candidate, transporting him and many other heroes and villains to another dimension to wait the next match following Captain America's win over Doctor Doom.

== Powers and abilities ==
Because of his unusual genetic heritage, Namor is unique among both ordinary humans and Atlanteans; he is sometimes referred to as "Marvel's first mutant" because, while the majority of his observed superhuman powers come from the fact that he is a hybrid of human and Atlantean DNA, his ability to fly cannot be explained by either side (Atlanteans are an offshoot of "baseline" humanity); however, in terms of in-continuity chronology, there were many mutants in existence before Namor. Namor possesses a fully amphibious physiology suited for extreme undersea pressures, superhuman strength, speed, agility, durability, flight, and longevity. Namor has the ability to survive underwater for indefinite periods, and specially developed vision which gives him the ability to see clearly in the murky depths of the ocean.

Bill Everett, in his first Sub-Mariner story, described the character as "an ultra-man of the deep [who] lives on land and in the sea, flies in the air, [and] has the strength of a thousand [surface] men". No other powers were mentioned. When the series was revived in 1954, Namor lost his ankle wings and with them the power of flight; they, and his full strength, were restored in Sub-Mariner Comics #38 (Feb. 1955), in which Everett additionally wrote a flashback story, "Wings on His Feet", detailing their appearance on Namor at age 14. This story was twice reprinted during the Silver Age of Comic Books, in Marvel Super-Heroes #17 (Nov. 1968), and in the book Comix by Les Daniels.

Namor has the ability to swim at superhuman speeds, even by Atlantean standards.

Namor has greater longevity than a normal human being. He is over 100 years old, but has the appearance of a male in his prime.

Namor's enhanced senses allow him to see in the deep ocean, hear distant sounds underwater, and sense small changes in ocean currents.

In all his incarnations, Namor possesses superhuman strength and, with the possible exceptions of Orka and Tyrak at their full sizes, is the strongest Atlantean ever known. The exact level of his strength is dependent upon his physical contact with water, in which he needn't be submerged. It has been shown as sufficient to effortlessly toss a water-filled ocean-liner, despite the underwater viscosity. His strength diminishes slowly the longer he is out of contact with water, though an extended period on land does not result in his death, as it would for a typical Atlantean, and his power is retained in full as long as he keeps himself wet. Namor possesses superhuman stamina and resistance to injury due to his hybrid nature. Namor's strength level is such that he has held his own in hand-to-hand combat with beings as powerful as the Hulk in the past.

Some stories have mentioned that Namor has gills for breathing underwater, e.g., in Namor, the Sub-Mariner #5, Namor thinks "this New York river water burns my gills and scalds my lungs". and artists such as Salvador Larroca have drawn him with gill slits on either side of his neck. In The Sub-Mariner #18–22 (1969–70), beings from outer space surgically closed Namor's gills for a time, leaving him with the ability to breathe air but unable to breathe underwater. Other sources have stated that his lungs contain oxygen diffusing membranes that allow him to breathe underwater.

Namor possesses a telepathic rapport with all forms of marine life. He is able to mentally communicate with most forms of Ichthyoid, Cephalopod, Plankton, Anthozoa, Csnidarian, etc.; and can mentally persuade them to do his bidding. Namor can mentally communicate with other Atlanteans and give mental-telepathic orders to all his men. He had a limited empathic rapport with Namorita, but only as a result of being given one of her "magic earrings" (which has long since disappeared).

Due to a unique aspect of his hybrid nature, not shared by Namorita, it was theorized that Namor is vulnerable to oxygen imbalances in his blood that trigger manic-depressive mood swings; he can prevent imbalances by regular immersion in water.

In terms of intellect, Namor was educated by the royal tutors of the Atlantean court, and can speak many surface languages including Atlantean and Lemurian. Later he is depicted as being a highly skilled businesses executive. Namor has also been depicted having slews of vast Atlantean technologies and forces at his disposal. These include powerful mystical relics in his national treasury he regularly makes use of; like the Trident of Neptune, patron weapon of his kingdom's founding sea god Poseidon among others.

The weapon supposedly comes with many replicas as an adversary who held the sea king in resentment due to prior infractions he had in the past utilized a true oceanic scepter while Namor held only a ceremonial copy. Said recipient would study up on the lore of Atlantis's mythical, mystical background and discovered a hidden treasure cove pertaining to numerous magical relics in the ocean deity's possession. One that would enable he and all others who wielded it power over the waters of the world and the vast metaphysical might of its namesake to which they could accomplish a great many feats. Other powers include that of physical transformation, such as changing a human into merfolk, firing destructive energy beams, commanding the creatures of the brine to act on its wielders behalf, as well as influence both weather and the tides of the world to do their bidding. Like all weapons and reliquary crafted by and for the Olympian Pantheon, such as Heracles' Adamantine Mace, the trident is composed of indestructible metal belonging to the gods, able to battle against multiple enforcers of the Thor Corps and their legions of Mjolnir hammers without taking any damage.

Through unknown means, Namor later siphoned the hydrokinesis abilities of Hydro-Man. He was able to flood a prison cell containing Roxxon murderers miles away from the ocean using the penal facility's sewage line. When he went to conscript the Sea Blades in preparation for war on the surface world, he literally parted the seas around them only to drop the waters back into place.

In the past Namor has interacted with the Serpent Crown throughout his adventures, in later publishing he has regained access to all of its supernatural facilities to augment his own powers.

=== Former powers and abilities ===
In The Fantastic Four #9 (Dec. 1962), Namor states, "I have the powers of all the creatures who live beneath the sea! I can charge the very air with electricity – using the power of the electric eel!" In the same issue, "the radar sense of the cave fish from the lowest depths of the sea" enables him to sense the presence of Sue Storm when she is invisible. He uses "the power to surround himself with electricity in the manner of an electric eel" again in Strange Tales #107 (April 1963), and #125 (Oct. 1964); in the former, he manifests the power to inflate his body like a puffer fish. An editorial note in Marvel Tales #9 (July 1967), which reprinted the story from Strange Tales #107, stated explicitly that "nautical Namor has since lost his power to imitate the characteristics of fish..." His electrical abilities were seen in later comics, and in the 1991 Spider-Man: The Video Game.

In Marvel Mystery Comics #2 (Dec. 1939) Namor once boasted a personal hydration function of his physiology, once extinguishing a pedestrian had been set on fire by cigarette light. His body excreted water from his individual pores, dousing the flames. During Namor's original fight with the Human Torch in Marvel Mystery Comics #8 (June 1940, and the first fight between superheroes at Marvel), Namor was able to forcibly expel water from his body to extinguish fires, although it proved useless against the Torch.

Namor was given possession of the Time Gem which he did not use. This gem allows the user total control over the past, present, and future. It allows time travel, can age and de-age beings, and can be used as a weapon by trapping enemies or entire worlds in unending loops of time. After the Hood attempted to steal the Gems, Namor briefly helped Thor recover the Gem from the bottom of the ocean to prevent the Hood acquiring it, before being entrusted with the Power Gem as the Gems were divided amongst the new Illuminati – Steve Rogers replacing Black Bolt – once again.

Namor was host for a fifth of the Phoenix Force as one of the Phoenix Five. He lost the Phoenix Force in battle with the Scarlet Witch. He summoned the Phoenix Force to regain those powers, but the Phoenix decided to choose its next host in a tournament. Each candidate, including Namor, was temporarily given a portion of the Phoenix Force, until Echo was chosen as its new host.

== "Marvel's first mutant" ==
Marvel has repeatedly identified Namor as "Marvel's first mutant," which is accurate when describing first appearances in print. However, he is not the oldest mutant within the fictional Marvel Universe timeline. A number of mutants predate him, including Selene, Apocalypse, Romulus, Exodus, Sabretooth, Azazel, Wolverine, Mystique, and Destiny.

In X-Men #6 (July 1964), X-Men leader Professor Xavier and antagonist Magneto each suspect Namor is a mutant and make efforts to recruit him. Later writers in the 1960s and 1970s described him as a hybrid, not a mutant, to distinguish him from the mutant X-Men. When the series was revived in 1990, the series title logo carried the subtitle "Marvel's first and mightiest mutant!"

Namor is actually a hybrid of Atlantean and human physiology, although he has principal characteristics that neither Atlanteans (Homo mermanus) nor humans (Homo sapiens) possess. These include his ability to fly, and possibly his durability and strength (which is several times that of an Atlantean).

In the first issue of the five-part Illuminati miniseries, after being experimented on by the Skrulls, it was confirmed that Namor is not only an Atlantean/human hybrid but also a mutant.

== Enemies ==
- Attuma – Leader of the Atlantean barbarians, Attuma would threaten Atlantis repeatedly; conquering it on several occasions, and became Namor's nemesis.
- Byrrah – Childhood friend and rival to Namor, Byrrah was a member of the Atlantean royalty who lost the throne to Namor and observed him as unfit for the position. For many years, he would challenge Namor's rule and ally with his enemies to usurp him. Eventually, he appears to have made peace with Namor and stands by his side as a brother.
- Captain Barracuda – A modern-day pirate employing advanced technology who frequently crossed swords with Namor (and several other heroes).
- Deep Six – A group formed by Attuma to maintain his rule of Atlantis during one of his periods as its conqueror. His subordinates included Tiger Shark, Orka, Piranha, Sea Urchin, and Nagala (bearing the Serpent Crown).
- Doctor Doom – Sometimes allies, sometimes enemies, Doom and Namor use each other but inevitably turn against each other when their ultimate sensibilities override the benefits of working together. This has been their perpetual relationship since first meeting years ago.
- Lemuel Dorcas – A brilliant scientist who created several of Namor's greatest threats such as Tiger Shark, Orka, and Piranha, often working alongside the likes of Attuma and Byrrah. He appeared to die in a battle with Namor, but later turned up alive with starfish-based abilities.
- Fathom Five – Led by Llyron, the son of Namor's enemy Llyra and supposedly Namor himself. Later, it is revealed that Llyron is the grandson of Namor's half-brother that was passed off as Namor's successor who usurped his throne, Fathom Five sought to wipe out humanity. Its members include Dragonrider, Bloodtide, Manowar, and Sea Leopard.
- Great White – An albino villain and shark trainer. He ambushed Loa and her father while they were surfing. Loa managed to use her ability to kill the sharks while Great White was defeated by Namor.
- Karthon the Quester – A faithful servant to Lemurian ruler Naga who sought the Serpent Crown for his master from Namor. His sense of honor conflicted with his master and after Naga's rule was toppled, Karthon became king and an ally to Namor.
- Llyra – A Lemurian who usurped Karthon's rule of his kingdom and became Namor's enemy when he tried to restore his friend and ally. She would return to face him repeatedly, in time becoming high priestess of Set.
- Magneto – More often amicable allies than anything else, Magneto would approach Namor during his Brotherhood's first outing as Supervillains to join forces against humanity. Initially, the latter refused, seeking to work alone, but having worked with the X-Men, Magnus included, Namor respects the mutant revolutionary nonetheless.
- Naga – Longtime wielder of the Serpent Crown, Naga would rule Lemuria until he was murdered by his staunchest aide Karthon.
- Orka – An underling of Krang empowered by Doctor Dorcas to be massively strong and grow stronger in the presence of orcas. He would return repeatedly as a minion for Namor's enemies.
- Piranha – Created by Doctor Dorcas, the Piranha is an ever-evolving enemy of Namor to return again and again.
- Puppet Master – Using Namor as a pawn on several occasions, such as against the Fantastic Four and in obtaining funds, the Puppet Master would garner the ire of the sea king. On one occasion, when Namor considered befriending the Hulk, Puppet Master took the green behemoth over and forced him to battle Namor.
- Tiger Shark – An Olympic swimmer transformed by Doctor Dorcas into a hybrid of Namor's DNA and a tiger shark. He battles Namor repeatedly over the years, at one time an ally to the sea king, though today he has again chosen to be his enemy.
- Tyrak – A powerful warrior in Attuma's army who can grow to monstrous size and bears incredible physical strength.
- U-Man – Meranno was a childhood rival to Namor who joined the Third Reich and took the name U-Man. Leading the Nazis to Atlantis, their attack left its emperor in a coma with Namor succeeding him. During World War II, he would be Namor's frequent sparring partner.
- Warlord Krang – One-time military leader of Atlantis' forces, Krang tried to usurp Namor's power and became an enemy to the kingdom. He would return repeatedly to challenge Namor.

== Reception ==
=== Critical response ===
Richard Fink of MovieWeb called Namor a "fan favorite for years," writing, "The character has a long rich history in the comics and has had dealings with The Fantastic Four, the X-Men, the Hulk, and many more. He has been both an ally and an enemy to the heroes. He is one of the first comic book antiheroes, and his status as the first Marvel character has made him an appealing one for adaptation." Matt Wood of CinemaBlend included Namor in their "5 Marvel Villains We'd Love To See In Black Panther 2" list. Marco Vito Oddo of Collider included Namor in their "7 Most Powerful Avengers Who Aren't in the MCU" list. Screen Rant included Namor in their "15 Best Antiheroes In Marvel Comics" list, in their "15 Most Powerful Black Panther Villains" list, in their "10 Most Powerful Hercules Villains In Marvel Comics" list, in their "10 Best Black Panther Comics Characters Not In The MCU" list, and in their "MCU: 10 Most Desired Fan Favorite Debuts Expected In The Multiverse Saga" list, and ranked Namor 1st in their "Marvel's 10 Most Powerful Aquatic Characters" list. Cameron Bonomolo of ComicBook.com included Namor the Submariner in their "7 Great Villains for Black Panther 2" list, while Chase Magnett ranked him 4th in their "8 Best Black Panther Villains" list, writing, "Over the past 10 years, Black Panther and Namor have developed one of the most engaging rivalries in all of superhero comics," and Lance Cartelli ranked him 43rd in their "50 Most Important Superheroes Ever" list.

Comic Book Resources ranked Namor 1st in their "10 Most Iconic Black Panther Villains" list, 2nd in their "10 Strongest Aquatic Superheroes" list, and 13th in their "30 Strongest Marvel Superheroes" list. Aaron Young of Looper ranked Namor 12th in their "Strongest Superheroes In History" list. IGN ranked Namor 14th in their "Top 50 Avengers" list, and 77th in their "Top 100 Comic Book Heroes" list. Andrew Wheeler of ComicsAlliance ranked Namor 16th in their "50 Sexiest Male Characters in Comics" list. Rob Bricken of Gizmodo ranked Namor 29th in their "Every Member Of The Avengers" list. Lance Cartelli of GameSpot ranked Namor 35th in their "50 Most Important Superheroes" list, saying, "Namor played an important role in comic books as the medium’s first antihero." Darren Franich of Entertainment Weekly ranked Namor 47th in their "Let's Rank Every Avenger Ever" list. Wizard magazine ranked Namor 88th in their "The 200 Greatest Comic Book Characters of All Time" list.

== Literary reception ==
=== Volumes ===
During the period known as the Golden Age of Comic Books, Namor was one of Timely Comics' "Big Three," alongside Captain America and the original Human Torch. During this period, Namor's Sub-Mariner title was selling millions of copies.

==== Namor (2003) ====
According to Diamond Comic Distributors, Namor #2 was the 43rd best selling comic book in May 2003.

Jared Gaudreau of Comic Book Resources ranked the Namor comic book series 2nd in their "15 Best Namor Comics" list, writing, "Along with becoming more narratively rich, this comic gave Namor something he'd never had before: a serious love interest named Sandra Pierce."

==== Namor: The First Mutant (2010) ====
According to Diamond Comic Distributors, Namor: The First Mutant #1 was the 42nd best selling comic book in August 2010.

Shawn S. Lealos of Screen Rant included the Namor: The First Mutant comic book series in their "10 Best Ever Namor Comics To Read" list.

==== Namor: The Best Defense (2018) ====
According to Diamond Comic Distributors, Namor: The Best Defense #1 was the 50th best selling comic book in December 2018.

Charlie Ridgely of ComicBook.com gave Namor: The Best Defense #1 a grade of 5 out of 5, writing, "Chip Zdarsky has proven in the past that he can write incredibly fun, light-hearted characters like Peter Parker and The Thing. However, he makes a very bold statement with this issue of Namor, as he declares that he's far more than you might believe him to be. Zdarsky writes the hell out of Namor, who is about as damaged, serious, and complicated as you can get in the Marvel universe. He does so with a precision and depth that is slightly unexpected, but completely refreshing when dealing with a character that has often been underutilized. Between Defenders and Avengers, it's very clear that a Namor resurgence is underway, and Chip Zdarsky is leading the charge."

==== Namor: The Last King of Atlantis (2025) ====
Author Jason Aaron said, "For a long time now, I've wanted to do a Namor story like this, something that's very much a dark exploration of one of truest antiheroes, while also serving as a roadmap and a redefinition of the entire undersea world. In the same way I used THE WAR OF THE REALMS to explore the various lands and denizens of Thor's particular corner of the Marvel landscape, this book is meant to guide us through the various exotic cultures and wondrous locales of the deep sea kingdoms in a way we've never seen before."

== Other versions ==
=== Amalgam Comics ===
Aqua Mariner, an amalgamation of Namor and DC Comics character Aquaman, appears in Amalgam Comics.

=== Earth X ===
An alternate universe version of Namor appears in Earth X. After Terrigen Mist contaminates the oceans, he develops dementia and kills Johnny Storm before Franklin Richards uses his powers to permanently set half of Namor's body on fire; turning him into Namor the Cursed. Years later, Namor would be brainwashed and forced to join the Skull's army.

=== Exiles ===
Multiple alternate reality versions of Namor appear in Exiles, such as one who took over Latveria and one who married Sue Storm, with whom he had a son named Remy.

=== Marvel 1602 ===
An alternate reality version of Namor from Earth-311 named Numenor appears in Marvel 1602: Fantastick Four. This version is the emperor of Bensaylum, a city beyond the edge of the world. Additionally, he and his people are not Homo mermanus. While conspiring with Otto von Doom to win over Susan Storm, von Doom betrays and kills Numenor.

=== Marvel Noir ===
An alternate reality version of Namor from Earth-90214 appears in Marvel Noir. This version is the captain of a submarine disguised as a fishing trawler called the Dorma, an infamous pirate who slices his and his crew's ears to resemble shark fins, and an associate of Tony Stark.

=== MC2 ===
A possible future version of Namor appears in Marvel Comics 2. By this time, he has become an occasional member of the Defenders and taken Doctor Doom captive after the latter destroyed Atlantis a decade prior. Though Doom escapes to capture and torture Namor in the present, Reed Richards sacrifices himself to save Namor.

=== Sub-Mariner: The Depths ===
An alternate timeline version of Namor appears in the Marvel Knights series Sub-Mariner: The Depths. This version hails from an alternate 1950s and initially exists as a legend among mariners said to pursue and kill any who search for Atlantis.

=== Ultimate Marvel ===
An alternate universe version of Namor from Earth-1610 appears in Ultimate Fantastic Four. This version is an Atlantean criminal who was said to have been imprisoned in a hibernation state nine millennia prior for falsely calling himself king of Atlantis. In the present, the Fantastic Four awaken him.

=== Ultimate Universe ===
An alternate universe version of Namor from Earth-6160 appears in The Ultimates #12. This version worked with the Invaders during WWII until he was overthrown by Attuma and killed.

== In other media ==
=== Television ===
Namor as he appears in the Fantastic Four (1994) episode "Now Comes the Sub-Mariner"

- In the 1950s, a Namor television series starring Richard Egan was planned, but it never went into production.
- In the 1970s, a Sub-Mariner television pilot was announced, but never filmed. It has been claimed that this was due to its similarity to the short-lived Man from Atlantis. although the veracity of this is disputed. A comic book of the series was published by Marvel.
- Namor appears in a self-titled segment of The Marvel Super Heroes, voiced by John Vernon.
- Prince Triton, a substitute for Namor, appears in Fantastic Four (1967), voiced by Mike Road.
- Namor appears in the Spider-Man (1981) episode "Wrath of the Sub-Mariner", voiced by Vic Perrin.
- Namor appears in the Spider-Man and His Amazing Friends episode "7 Little Superheroes", voiced by William Woodson.
- Namor appears in the Fantastic Four (1994) episode "Now Comes the Sub-Mariner", voiced by James Warwick.
- Namor appears in The Avengers: United They Stand episode "To Rule Atlantis", voiced by Raoul Trujillo.
- Namor appears in Fantastic Four: World's Greatest Heroes, voiced by Michael Adamthwaite.

=== Film ===
Development of a film based on Namor the Sub-Mariner began at Marvel Studios in April 1997, when Philip Kaufman was negotiating to direct the film, entitled Namor: Sub-Mariner. Kaufman was developing the film the next month when he revealed it would tackle environmental issues by depicting Namor as having "bad feelings" towards the land residents of Earth over ecological concerns. By July 1999, Sam Hamm was in negotiations to write the script. In June 2001, Universal Pictures entered negotiations to gain the rights for Namor, with then Marvel Studios President Avi Arad and Kevin Misher set to produce the film. Arad felt that the film could explore environmental issues such as oil spills, underwater bomb testing, pollution and global warming. By then, writers were being sought for the project. Universal hired David Self to write the script in July 2002 for an intended 2004 release. The following month, Randall Frakes was revealed to have worked on the script for Namor, the Sub-Mariner at Saban Entertainment.

In October 2002, Marvel Studios announced that it had finalized a deal with Universal to produce the Sub-Mariner film after their work together on Hulk (2003). Avi Arad said the film would be an "epic underwater tale of majestic fantasy", which Marvel described as following the adventures of Namor as a prince from Atlantis who is a "half-human/half-amphibian" and a "troubled rebel with a short temper" and has helped humans and fought them over pollution. Kevin Feige, Stan Lee, and Self were set as executive producers, while Avi Arad was a co-producer. By July 2004, Marvel and Arad entered negotiations for Chris Columbus to direct the project, and he signed on as director and producer of Sub-Mariner by that December, developing it through his production company 1492 Pictures. The film was slated for a 2007 release. However, Columbus said in November 2005 that he was unlikely to make the film. In September 2006, Universal and Marvel Studios hired Jonathan Mostow to write and direct The Sub-Mariner, with the film following Namor discovering he is a prince of Atlantis who is key in a war between the modern surface world and the underwater world. Feige said the heart of the film's story would be "tempered" with Namor being stuck between those two worlds. Mostow said The Sub-Mariner was still in active development in August 2009 and that they were still working on getting the script right. He also explained that Universal kept renewing the option to produce the property.

Marvel Entertainment's chief creative officer (CCO) Joe Quesada said in May 2012 and June 2016 that to his knowledge, Marvel Studios held the film rights to Namor. In August 2013, Feige, who since became the President of Marvel Studios, said that Universal still held the rights to Namor and that the character would not appear in Marvel Studios' Marvel Cinematic Universe (MCU) at that time because of it. In April 2014, Feige said the rights to Namor were a "little complicated," while The Hollywood Reporter's Borys Kit revealed in May that Marvel held the Namor rights and not Universal. That July, Feige clarified that Marvel could make a Namor film, instead of Universal and Legendary Pictures as was rumored, but noted there were older contracts with other parties that needed to be worked out before they could move forward with a film. In February 2017, Production Weekly included The Sub-Mariner in their report of upcoming projects in development, when the production was expected to take place in Hawaii. In April 2018, Feige reiterated Namor's rights were complicated, with Universal holding the distribution rights, and said in October that Namor could appear in the MCU and that Marvel Studios was deciding if and when he could. In November 2022, Marvel Studios executive Nate Moore confirmed that they cannot make a standalone Namor film since Universal still holds the character's distribution rights, similar to the Hulk. In March 2023, Citigroup financial analyst Jason Bazinet felt Disney might have tried to include the distribution rights to Namor, along with Hulk, in a potential sale of a majority stake in the streaming service Hulu to Comcast, the owner of Universal Pictures through NBCUniversal. Comcast ultimately sold its minority stake in Hulu to Disney in a deal which did not involve any other assets.

=== Marvel Cinematic Universe ===
- K'uk'ulkan / Namor appears in the MCU film Black Panther: Wakanda Forever (2022), portrayed by Tenoch Huerta Mejía. This version is the king of Talokan, an ancient civilization of water-dwelling people connected to the Mayas, as well as a mutant. Namor has an antagonistic role in the film, similar to some versions in the comics. In 1571, his mother Fen ingested a Vibranium-laced herb to gain immunity from smallpox while pregnant with her son. This caused her and the rest of Yucatán's people to develop blue skin and grow gills that restricted their ability to breathe air on the surface, forcing them to relocate underwater and establish Talokan as a new civilization. Namor underwent an additional mutation at birth which gave him longevity, pointed ears and winged ankles enabling him to fly, as well as the ability to breathe oxygen and water simultaneously.
- Michael Waldron, the writer for the MCU film Doctor Strange in the Multiverse of Madness (2022), previously said there had been talks about including Namor in that film as a member of the Illuminati as in the comics, but his inclusion was dropped because Marvel Studios had other plans for the character.
- A zombified variant of Namor appears in the second episode of the Disney+ animated miniseries Marvel Zombies (2025). Under Scarlet Witch's control, he attacked Zemo's sanctuary for survivors. After Zemo failed to sacrifice Shang-Chi and Kamala Khan's survivor groups to him, he killed John Walker before being killed by Kamala.
- Huerta will reprise his role as Namor in Avengers: Doomsday (2026).

=== Video games ===
- Namor appears as a playable character in Spider-Man: The Video Game.
- Namor makes a cameo appearance in Captain America and The Avengers.
- Namor appears as a boss in Fantastic Four (1997).
- Namor makes a cameo appearance in Spider-Man (2000)'s "What If?" mode.
- Namor appears as an assist character in the Game Boy Advance version of Marvel: Ultimate Alliance, voiced by Peter Renaday.
- Namor appears in Marvel Puzzle Quest.
- Namor appears in Marvel Contest of Champions.
- Namor appears as a playable character in Marvel Strike Force.
- Namor appears as a playable character in Marvel: Future Fight.
- Namor appears as a playable character in Marvel Super War.
- Namor appears as a card in Marvel Snap.
- Namor appears as a playable character in Marvel Rivals voiced by Daniel Marin. His design and portrayal incorporate aspects from the comics and his appearance in the MCU.

=== Miscellaneous ===
- Namor appears in the Inhumans motion comic, voiced by Trevor Devall.
- Namor appears in the Spider-Man 2 novelization as the garbage man who finds Spider-Man's suit in the trash and brings it to J. Jonah Jameson at the Daily Bugle.

== See also ==
- List of Marvel Comics superhero debuts
- Aquaman - a similar character from DC Comics
