= Defenders (comics) =

Comic book superhero team

- A giclée featuring the original version of the team by artist Alex Ross. It homages the comic book cover The Defenders (February 1980) #80, originally drawn by Rich Buckler

Publication information
- Publisher: Marvel Comics
- First appearance: Marvel Feature #1 (December 1971)
- Created by: Roy Thomas; Ross Andru

In-story information
- Base(s): Sanctum Sanctorum; Richmond Riding Academy; Patsy Walker's Montclair, NJ house

Roster

The Defenders are a superhero group with rotating membership appearing in American comic books published by Marvel Comics. They are usually presented as a "non-team" of individualistic outsiders who are known for following their own agendas. The team often battle mystic and supernatural threats.

Its original incarnation was led by Doctor Strange and included Hulk, Namor, and Silver Surfer. They first appeared as the Defenders in Marvel Feature #1 (Dec. 1971), before receiving their own title, The Defenders, in 1972.

The group had a rotating line-up from 1972 until 1986, with Dr. Strange and the Hulk being usually constant members along with a number of other mainstays such as Valkyrie, Nighthawk, Hellcat, Gargoyle, Beast, the Son of Satan and Luke Cage, and many temporary members. The publication was retitled The New Defenders near the end of the run, featuring none of the original members and only Valkyrie, Beast and the Gargoyle of the former long-term members. The concept was modified in the 1993–95 series Secret Defenders, in which Dr. Strange assembles different teams for each individual mission. The original team was reunited in a short-lived 2001 series by Kurt Busiek and Erik Larsen. In 2005 Marvel published a five-issue miniseries featuring the classic line-up by J. M. DeMatteis, Keith Giffen and Kevin Maguire. In December 2011 writer Matt Fraction and artist Terry Dodson launched a Defenders series with a mixture of classic and new members, which lasted for 12 issues.

A television miniseries, The Defenders, set in the Marvel Cinematic Universe premiered in 2017 on Netflix, with the team consisting of Daredevil, Jessica Jones, Luke Cage, and Iron Fist.

== Publication history ==
The origin of the Defenders lies in two crossover story arcs by Roy Thomas prior to the official founding of the team. The first, in Doctor Strange #183 (November 1969), Sub-Mariner #22 (February 1970), and The Incredible Hulk #126 (April 1970), occurred due to the Dr. Strange series being canceled in the middle of a story arc, leaving Thomas no choice but to resolve the storyline in other series that he wrote. In the story, Dr. Strange teams with Namor and the Hulk to protect the Earth from invasion by Lovecraftian interplanar beings known as the Undying Ones and their leader, the Nameless One. Barbara Norriss, later the host of the Valkyrie, first appears in this story. In the second arc, featured in Sub-Mariner #34–35 (February–March 1971), Namor enlists the aid of the Silver Surfer and the Hulk to stop a potentially devastating weather control experiment, inadvertently freeing a small island nation from a dictator and facing the Avengers under the name of the "Titans Three".

The Defenders first appeared as a feature in Marvel Feature #1 (December 1971), where the founding members gather to battle the alien techno-wizard Yandroth and remain as a team afterward. Editor Stan Lee, wanting to write all of the Silver Surfer's stories personally, had asked other writers not to use the character, and suggested that Thomas use Doctor Strange instead. Thomas has also speculated that Lee came up with the team's name: "The 'Defenders' is far too passive a name for my taste. I prefer more aggressive-sounding names like the 'Avengers' or the 'Invaders,' so Stan probably came up with that one." Due to the popularity of their tryout in Marvel Feature, Marvel soon began publishing The Defenders with Steve Englehart writing and Sal Buscema penciling, while Thomas moved into the editor's seat. Despite Lee's continuing edict on the use of the Silver Surfer, he approved Englehart's pitch to include the Silver Surfer in the story.

Valkyrie was introduced to the team in issue #4 (February 1973). Englehart wrote "The Avengers–Defenders War" crossover in The Avengers #116–118 (October–December 1973) and The Defenders #9–11 (October–December 1973), leaving The Defenders afterwards because he "didn't want to keep doing two team books at the same time." Len Wein briefly wrote the series and introduced such characters as Alpha the Ultimate Mutant and the Wrecking Crew. Wein also added Nighthawk to the cast because, in his words, doing so "gave me a character to play with who didn't have a whole lot of previous history ... [a] character I could do anything I wanted to without worrying about how it would affect any other titles that character might appear in."

Steve Gerber first worked on the characters in Giant-Size Defenders #3 (January 1975) and became the writer of the main title with issue #20 the following month. He wrote the series until issue #41 (November 1976). Part of Gerber's oeuvre was reviving forgotten characters; he brought back three pre-Marvel characters, now organized as the Headmen, as well as the Guardians of the Galaxy. The Defenders met Gerber's Howard the Duck in Marvel Treasury Edition #12 (1976).

Due to Marvel's shuffling of editors-in-chief, a brief run by Gerry Conway abruptly ended in mid-production on issue #45. David Anthony Kraft and Roger Slifer volunteered to write the series, but issue #45 had no written plot, having been drawn by Giffen following a story conference with Conway. Kraft and Slifer were unable to contact either Conway or Giffen, and so had to puzzle out Conway's plot from the unscripted artwork.

David Anthony Kraft's run as writer included "The Scorpio Saga" (issues #46, 48–50) and the "Xenogenesis: Day of the Demons" storyline (issues #58–60). The "Defenders for a Day" storyline in issues #62–64 saw dozens of new applicants attempting to join the Defenders, as well as a number of villains attempting to present themselves as Defenders members in order to confuse the authorities and the public as they commit robberies. Kraft and artist Ed Hannigan explained some of the Valkyrie's backstory in The Defenders #66–68 (December 1978 – February 1979). At Kraft's request, Hannigan helped write issue #67 but found that he could not handle both writing and artwork at once, and so transitioned to being just the series's writer with the following issue.

Steven Grant wrote a conclusion to Steve Gerber's Omega the Unknown series in two issues of The Defenders, at the end of which most of the original series' characters were killed. While Gerber seemed unhappy with Grant's conclusion, it nevertheless tied up the loose ends of the comic series, and is considered "canon" by Marvel.

Writer J. M. DeMatteis took over the series with issue #92. He and Mark Gruenwald co-wrote The Defenders #107–109 (May–July 1982), which resolved remaining plot points from the Valkyrie story by Kraft and Hannigan published three years earlier.

=== The New Defenders ===
As of issue #125, The Defenders was retitled to The New Defenders as the original four members (Doctor Strange, Silver Surfer, Hulk, and Namor) are forced to leave the team, in response to an alien prophecy that states that these four, operating as a group, would be responsible for destroying the world. In the same issue, Beast reforms the team as an official superhero team complete with government clearance.

DeMatteis stayed on for only six issues of The New Defenders before turning it over to writer Peter Gillis, whose run was marked by shorter, more personal stories. Gillis recounted, "I had been working for a while at Marvel, and was constantly pumping for more work, and specifically a series of my own. So when I heard DeMatteis was leaving Defenders, I was in [editor] Carl Potts' office like a shot, and I got the gig."

Though the series remained a modest hit through the Gillis/Perlin run, it was cancelled to make room in Marvel's production schedule for the New Universe line. The final issue was The New Defenders #152. In the final issue, several members (Gargoyle, Moondragon, and Valkyrie), plus allies (Andromeda, Manslaughter, Interloper) are seemingly killed in battle, while the remaining mutant members leave the team to join X-Factor. Gillis claimed that killing off the other members of the group was a directive from the editorial staff to free up the surviving members for usage in X-Factor, pointing out that he shortly after revived several of these seemingly-deceased members in issues of Solo Avengers, Strange Tales vol. 2 #5–7, and issues #3–4 of the relaunched Doctor Strange, Sorcerer Supreme series.

=== The Return of the Defenders ===
In 1990, the original trio reunited in The Incredible Hulk #370–371, in which it was revealed that the prophecy was a hoax. The originals then rejoined with the Silver Surfer in a story entitled The Return of the Defenders running in The Incredible Hulk Annual #18, Namor the Sub-Mariner Annual #2, Silver Surfer Annual #5, and Dr. Strange, Sorcerer Supreme Annual #2.

=== Secret Defenders ===
In 1993, Marvel sought to revive the "Defenders" brand as "The Secret Defenders". The new team first appeared, unofficially, in Dr. Strange #50 and later Fantastic Four #374, before being officially introduced in Secret Defenders #1. The series' premise originally was that Doctor Strange would organize various teams of heroes for certain missions, with him as the leader. Members included Wolverine, Darkhawk, Spider-Woman, Spider-Man, Hulk, Nomad, Ghost Rider, and others. This lasted for the first several months of the title, before Doctor Strange was removed from the book, due to the character being reassigned to the "Midnight Sons" line at Marvel. After an arc where Thanos organized a team of "Secret Defenders" for a mission, leadership of the Secret Defenders passed to Doctor Druid and the series itself abandoned the revolving-door roster in favor of Druid and the Cognoscenti. The series was canceled with Secret Defenders #25.

=== Reunion and The Order ===
In 2001–02, the Defenders reunited in Defenders (vol. 2) #1–12 created by Kurt Busiek and Erik Larsen, immediately followed by The Order #1–6, in which Yandroth manipulated Gaea into "cursing" the primary four Defenders (Doctor Strange, Namor, the Hulk, and the Silver Surfer) so that they would be summoned to major crisis situations. These members were then mind controlled by Yandroth into forming the world-dominating "Order"; once the Order were freed from this control by their fellow heroes (including their teammates Hellcat, Nighthawk, and Valkyrie), the Defenders apparently disbanded. A fill-in issue set between these two series was published in 2011.

=== 2005 miniseries ===
A Defenders five-issue miniseries debuted in July 2005, by Keith Giffen, J. M. DeMatteis, and Kevin Maguire, featuring Doctor Strange attempting to reunite the original four Defenders to battle Dormammu and Umar. This series focuses mostly on humor as the characters spend most of their time arguing with and criticizing one another.

=== The Last Defenders ===
In 2008, Joe Casey wrote a new miniseries with a new line-up of Defenders, following the aftermath of "Civil War". Nighthawk wanted a team made up of previous Defenders such as Hellcat and Devil Slayer but Tony Stark (Iron Man) makes the decision to select other heroes for the team. The line-up is led by Nighthawk, with Blazing Skull, Colossus, and She-Hulk as members. The Defenders are assigned to New Jersey under the Fifty State Initiative, because the proximity to New York City demands more experienced heroes than those within the Initiative. The team is disbanded for incompetence but Richmond eventually founds a team outside the Initiative with the Son of Satan, She-Hulk, Krang, and Nighthawk.

=== The Offenders ===
In the 2009 ongoing Hulk series (Issues #10–12), Red Hulk assembles a counter team of supervillains called the Offenders, which includes Baron Mordo, Terrax, and Tiger Shark, and fights past versions of their enemies.

=== Fear Itself: The Deep ===
During the 2011 "Fear Itself" storyline, Doctor Strange forms a new version of the Defenders with Lyra, Namor, Loa, and Silver Surfer to combat Attuma. Many past Defenders appear in the last issue.

=== 2011 series ===
Marvel launched a new Defenders series in December 2011, written by Matt Fraction and drawn by Terry Dodson. The new book features Doctor Strange, Red She-Hulk, Namor, Silver Surfer, and Iron Fist. The new series follows the reunion of the Defenders in Fear Itself: The Deep. During the battle against the Death Celestials, the characters Black Cat, Nick Fury, and Ant-Man join the team. The series was cancelled at issue #12. Despite the prophecy supposedly being a hoax, the central storyline of the series involves a reunion of the original four Defenders setting off a chain of events leading to the destruction of the universe. In the final issue, Strange changes the past so that the reunion never happens, thus erasing all the events of the series.

=== The Fearless Defenders ===
February 2013 saw the debut of The Fearless Defenders, a series written by Cullen Bunn with artwork by Will Sliney. Bunn said that he had wanted to write the series, which centers on a new team of Valkyrior, led by Valkyrie and Misty Knight, after writing Fear Itself: The Fearless. It was suggested to him that it should run as a Defenders title; however, Bunn explained that beyond the name there is "little connection" to the Defenders.

=== 2017 series ===
The Defenders (2017) #1, with the team consisting of Iron Fist, Luke Cage, Jessica Jones and Daredevil. Art by David Marquez.

In August 2017, Marvel launched a new Defenders comic book series starring Daredevil, Jessica Jones, Luke Cage and Iron Fist, based on the Netflix incarnation of the team. This incarnation of the Defenders appears in the storyline "Secret Empire", where they battle a group of villains who sought revenge for being imprisoned at Pleasant Hill.

=== The Best Defense ===
2018 saw a new five-part crossover storyline involving the "Big Four" members of the team. Published throughout December, the plot features separate issues all sub-titled "The Best Defense" in The Immortal Hulk, Namor, Doctor Strange and Silver Surfer which culminates in a final issue under the banner of The Defenders. Announced on August 24, 2018, the creative teams were respectively:

- Immortal Hulk written by Al Ewing and illustrated by Simone Di Meo
- Namor written by Chip Zdarsky and illustrated by Carlos Magno
- Doctor Strange written by Gerry Duggan and illustrated by Greg Smallwood
- Silver Surfer written and illustrated by Jason Latour
- The Defenders written by Al Ewing and illustrated by Joe Bennet.

=== 2021 series ===
In August 2021, Marvel launched a new Defenders series. Written by Al Ewing with art by Javier Rodriguez, this new version of the team features Doctor Strange, Silver Surfer, Masked Raider, Red Harpy, and Cloud.

=== Defenders: Beyond ===
Before the publication of the fifth and final issue of the 2021 series it was teased that the team would be returning after a short break in summer 2022 for another five part run. Following a message from beyond the grave from Doctor Strange, a new team is assembled featuring Blue Marvel, America Chavez, Taaia (the mother of Galactus), Tigra, and an alternate universe version of Loki to tackle a new cosmic threat.

=== Queen in Black: Defenders of Light and Dark ===
In March 2026, Marvel announced Queen in Black: Defenders of Light and Dark, a three-issue miniseries tying in to the "Queen in Black" event. Written by Tom Waltz and illustrated by Zé Carlos, the series follows a new incarnation of the Defenders formed to combat Knull and Hela.

== Other versions ==
=== "Age of Ultron" ===
An alternate universe iteration of the Defenders appears in Age of Ultron, consisting of Doctor Strange, Captain America, Wolverine, Captain Marvel, Thing, Cable, Hulk, and Star-Lord. This version of the group are Earth's premier superhero team following the disbanding of the Avengers.

=== Iron Man: Fatal Frontier ===
An alternate universe iteration of the Defenders appears in the Iron Man: Fatal Frontier storyline, consisting of Captain America, Hulk, Thor, and Rescue.

=== Secret Wars (2015) ===
Several alternate iterations of the Defenders appear in the "Secret Wars" storyline.

- The 2099 Defenders consists of Silver Surfer, Doctor Strange, Valkyrie, Roman the Sub-Mariner, and Hulk 2099.
- The Yinsen City Defenders consists of Captain Britain, She-Hulk, White Tiger, Kid Rescue, and Spider Hero.

=== Ultimate Marvel ===
An alternate universe iteration of the Defenders appears in the Ultimate Marvel imprint, consisting of Power Man, Hellcat, Nighthawk, Valkyrie, Black Knight, Daimon Hellstrom, Whiz-Kid, and Ant-Man. These versions are fame-seeking amateur vigilantes. In Ultimate Comics: New Ultimates (2010), Loki gives the Ultimates superpowers and tasks them with stealing Mjolnir.

=== Ultimate Universe ===
An alternate universe iteration of the Defenders from Earth-6160 appears in The Ultimates, consisting of Ballistic, Thora, Marvel Boy, Proctor, and Decay's Beautiful Daughter.

== In other media ==
=== Television ===
The Defenders and Stick from the 2017 miniseries (L-R: Mike Colter as Luke Cage, Scott Glenn as Stick, Finn Jones as Iron Fist, Krysten Ritter as Jessica Jones, Charlie Cox as Daredevil).

- The Defenders appear in The Super Hero Squad Show episode "Invader From the Dark Dimension!", consisting of Doctor Strange, Valkyrie, Hulk, Thor, and Silver Surfer.
- An alternate timeline incarnation of the Defenders appears in the Avengers Assemble episode "Planet Doom", consisting of Clint Barton / Bullseye, Sam Wilson / Snap, Peter Parker / Slinger, Frank Castle, Natasha Romanoff / Black Bride, Tony Stark, and Bruce Banner. This version of the group serves as the world's sole team of heroes after Doctor Doom prevents the formation of the Avengers and takes over the world.
- The Defenders appear in series set in the Marvel Cinematic Universe (MCU), consisting of Daredevil, Jessica Jones, Luke Cage, and Iron Fist. First appearing in a self-titled Marvel Netflix series, the group will return in the third season of the Disney+ television series Daredevil: Born Again.

=== Video games ===
- The Defenders appear in Marvel Avengers Academy, consisting of Colleen Wing, Daredevil, Hellcat, Iron Fist, Jessica Jones, Luke Cage, and Misty Knight.
- The Defenders appear in Marvel Ultimate Alliance 3: The Black Order, consisting of Daredevil, Luke Cage, Iron Fist, and Elektra as playable characters and Jessica Jones as a non-playable character.

=== Miscellaneous ===
The Justice League episode "The Terror Beyond" features Doctor Fate, Aquaman, Solomon Grundy, and Hawkgirl banding together to fight the otherdimensional deity Icthulhu. According to series developer Bruce Timm, the team is a homage to the Defenders, with each member paralleling a Marvel character (Doctor Fate / Doctor Strange, Aquaman / Namor, Solomon Grundy / Hulk, and Hawkgirl / Nighthawk).
