= Dorma (character) =

Marvel Comics fictional character

Publication information
- Publisher: Marvel Comics
- First appearance: Marvel Comics #1 (October 1939) (full)
- Created by: Bill Everett (writer / artist)

In-story information
- Alter ego: Dorma
- Species: Homo mermanus
- Place of origin: Atlantis
- Team affiliations: Swift Tide
- Partnerships: Namorita; Namora; Namor; Fin
- Notable aliases: Lady Dorma
- Abilities: Atlantean physiology granting: Superhuman strength, speed, durability; Ability to swim at superhuman speed; Ability to breathe underwater; Immunity to aging

Dorma is a character appearing in American comic books published by Marvel Comics. Created by writer and artist Bill Everett, the character first appeared in Marvel Comics #1 (October 1939). She debuted when Marvel Comics was known as Timely Comics. Dorma is a native aristocrat of the undersea kingdom of Atlantis. She initially was Namor the Sub-Mariner's cousin, and is depicted as his close confidant and childhood friend through several rewrites. Dorma was reintroduced in the late 1960s and early 1970s as Namor's lover and wife-to-be, before her death. She is also known under the codename Lady Dorma.

== Publication history ==
=== 1930s ===
Dorma debuted in Marvel Comics #1 (October 1939), the first comic book by Timely Comics, predecessor of Marvel, created by Bill Everett. She appeared in the 1950 Tales to Astonish series, the 1961 Fantastic Four series, the 1963 Fantastic Four Annual series, marking her first Silver Age appearance, and the 1968 Sub-Mariner series. Dorma was the beloved of Namor, Prince of Atlantis. In Sub-Mariner #36 (April 1971), Namor married Dorma — and discovered that the woman that he married was actually his disguised enemy Llyra, who murdered the real Dorma by bringing the water-breathing bride to the surface and causing her to suffocate in the open air. Writer Roy Thomas said that he decided to do away with Lady Dorma because "he felt that Sub-Mariner should be a lone wolf, and he didn't like the idea of his having such a stable home, a Lois Lane situation."

=== 2000s ===
Dorma appeared in the 2021 King in Black: Namor series.

== Fictional character biography ==
Dorma, daughter of Wa-Than, belongs to the Atlantean nobility. She is the cousin of Namor, heir to the Atlantean throne. Despite her initial hostility against her cousin, she eventually developed love for Namor as an adult. In an effort to win him over, Dorma helped her cousin attack the Cape Anna Lighthouse. She supported him when Atlantis was attacked by Luther Robinson and Lynne Harris, who assaulted their country in revenge, after a series of conflicts between Atlantis and the people of the surface. Dorma also fought alongside Namor against the Nazis.

Later, Dorma and Namor started a relationship, which was interrupted when Atlantis was attacked by a telepath named Paul Destine, who killed several inhabitants, with Namor suffering from amnesia. Dorma and Namor were subsequently reunited when Namor remembered his true identity. However, after Namor saved the life of Susan Storm / Invisible Girl, Dorma became jealous. She helped Attuma attack Atlantis out of vengeance. Namor later forgave her actions.

Dorma was engaged to be married to Namor when she was kidnapped by Llyra, who assumed her identity and tricked Namor into marrying her instead. However, according to Atlantean law, Dorma was now Namor's wife, not Llyra, despite her absence from the wedding ceremony. Furious, Llyra fled to the surface world, followed by an equally enraged Namor. Llyra returned to the imprisoned Dorma and smashed Dorma's water-filled prison. Unable to breathe out of water, Dorma suffocated, but not before she struck down Llyra and saved her husband's life.

== Powers and abilities ==
Dorma possesses an Atlantean physiology that grants her several abilities. She can breathe underwater and resist extreme water pressures and temperatures.

== Other versions ==
=== Civil War: House of M ===
An alternate version of Dorma appears in the House of M reality as the Queen of Atlantis.

=== Heroes Reborn ===
An alternate version of Dorma appears on a duplicate Earth that was the setting of the Heroes Reborn story arc. Her counterpart was the Queen of the Atlanteans. In contrast to the demurely elegant aristocrat on the original Earth, this alternate version of Dorma was a fierce warrior-woman.

== In other media ==
=== Television ===
- Lady Dorma appears in the "Namor" segment of The Marvel Super Heroes, voiced by Vita Linder.
- Lady Dorma appears in the Fantastic Four (1967) episode "Danger in the Depths," voiced by Janet Waldo. This version is depicted as originating from the underwater city of Pacifica due to Grantray-Lawrence Animation owning the rights to Namor at the time.
- Lady Dorma appears in the Fantastic Four (1994) episode "Now Comes the Sub-Mariner," voiced by Jane Carr. This version is Namor's girlfriend who is also pursued by his advisor Krang.
