= Atlantis (Marvel Comics) =

Fictional location in the Marvel Universe

- First appearance: (Unpublished) Motion Picture Funnies Weekly #1 (April 1939); (Published) Marvel Comics #1 (October 1939)
- Created by: Bill Everett
- Genre: Superhero

In-universe information
- Type: Kingdom
- Ruled by: Namor
- Race: Homo mermanus
- Publisher: Marvel Comics

Atlantis is a fictional location appearing in American comic books published by Marvel Comics. It is based on the mythical island of Atlantis first mentioned in Plato's initial dialogue the Timaeus, written c. 360 BC. In the Marvel Universe, Atlantis was a small continent (about the same size as modern Australia) with many human settlements. Over 21,000 years ago, an event called the "Great Cataclysm" caused it to be submerged into the sea.

Atlantis is a powerful and technologically advanced nation despite its underwater location. The kingdom's ruler, Namor, has served as both an ally and an adversary to various characters throughout the Marvel Universe. Willing to take extreme measures to protect his kingdom and the oceans, Namor has fought both alongside and against the Avengers.

== Fictional history ==
The inhabitants of ancient Atlantis built an enormous glass-like dome over the capital city, also known as Atlantis. When barbarians sent by the Deviant Lemuria empire attacked Atlantis, King Kamuu opened the magma-pits which were the city's means of heating, causing the continent to sink. Kamuu was warned of the Great Cataclysm by the seer Zhered-Na. When she refused to recant, he had her exiled to the mainland, where she was later stabbed to death by survivors of the submersion.

The priests and intellectuals of the city Netheria foresaw the Lemurian attack and fortified their city, and thus it sank intact. Netheria survived to the modern day, ruled by Queen Kala. Other ancient Atlanteans survived the sinking of the continent by various methods, including Dakimh the Enchanter, Varnae, and Stygyro.

About 8,000 years ago, a group of Homo mermanus nomads discovered the ruins of the city of Atlantis. They made the ruins of the human settlements in Atlantis their home and went on to develop a society there using as much of the material as they could salvage from the wreckage. These people are thus often referred to as "Atlanteans", as it is in the city of Atlantis that their first complex society emerged.

Five hundred years after the settlement of Atlantis, another group of Homo mermanus leave Atlantis to find their own city; this time in a part of the ruins of Lemuria, another continent submerged during the Great Cataclysm. These "Lemurians", as they now call themselves, discover the Serpent Crown in the ruins of their city. The Serpent Crown had been crafted by ancient Atlantean alchemists as a vessel empowered by the demonic Elder God Set. Through their leader Naga's exposure and extensive use of the ancient mystical device, the Lemurians take on a reptilian appearance.

Atlanteans have little or no contact with their human cousins for millennia. However, the two races come into sustained contact, often hostile, beginning in the 20th century. On occasions, Atlanteans invade the surface world. The current Prince, Namor the Sub-Mariner, is initially hostile to the surface world, but fights in alliance with the Allied Powers against the Axis powers during World War II. Namor defends Atlantis against villains like Attuma and Krang, who plot to overthrow him and take over Atlantis.

Following Namor's attack on Wakanda during Avengers vs. X-Men, the two nations engage in a violent conflict. After much bloodshed, Namor reaches out to Black Panther and extends a peace offering to Shuri. Despite this, Wakanda launches an all out strike on Atlantis, destroying the city and killing a number of Namor's soldiers in the process.

== Other versions ==
=== Exiles ===
Several alternate universe versions of Atlantis appear in Exiles:

- On Earth-1016, the Exiles encounter the forces of Atlantis, who are exterminating mankind. The Exiles work with this reality's Doctor Doom to fend off the Atlanteans.
- On Counter-Earth, Proteus raises Atlantis to the surface, suffocating its inhabitants.

=== Marvel Noir ===
In the Marvel Noir reality, Atlantis matched the descriptions of Plato with it being near the Pillars of Hercules, being highly advanced, and powered by Orichalcum. The Orichalcum proved to be too powerful to act as a superconductor and created a vortex that sunk Atlantis beneath the ocean.

=== Ultimate Marvel ===
In the Ultimate Marvel universe, Atlantis has been devoid of life for thousands of years. Upon being found by the Fantastic Four, Namor suggests that the continent was destroyed by Lemuria at some point during his time in stasis. During the Ultimatum storyline, it is revealed that the ruins of Atlantis contain a small pocket of survivors led by Namora.

== In other media ==
=== Television ===
- Atlantis appears in the Sub-Mariner segments of The Marvel Super Heroes.
- Atlantis, referred to as Pacifica, appears in the Fantastic Four (1967) episode "Danger in the Depths".
- Atlantis appears in the Spider-Man episode "Wrath of the Sub-Mariner."
- Atlantis appears in The Avengers: United They Stand episode "To Rule Atlantis."
- Atlantis appears in Fantastic Four: World's Greatest Heroes.
- Atlantis appears in Avengers Assemble.

=== Video games ===
- Atlantis appears in Marvel: Ultimate Alliance.
- Atlantis appears in Marvel Snap.
