= Attuma =

Marvel Comics fictional character

Publication information
- Publisher: Marvel Comics
- First appearance: Fantastic Four #33 (December 1964)
- Created by: Stan Lee (writer); Jack Kirby (artist)

In-story information
- Alter ego: Attuma
- Species: Homo mermanus
- Place of origin: Atlantis
- Team affiliations: Deep Six; The Worthy
- Notable aliases: Nerkkod
- Abilities: Expert hand-to-hand combatant Superhuman strength, agility, stamina, reflexes, and endurance High level swimming speed Specially developed vision Self-propelled flight Underwater and land adaptation Access to highly advanced weaponry

Attuma (/əˈtuːmə/) is a supervillain appearing in American comic books published by Marvel Comics. He is an Atlantean nomadic warlord who is usually depicted as an enemy of Namor the Sub-Mariner, and is the father of the superhero Andromeda. He believes he is the prophesied conqueror of the Atlantean Empire.

Attuma appears in the Marvel Cinematic Universe film Black Panther: Wakanda Forever (2022), portrayed by Alex Livinalli.

== Publication history ==
Attuma first appeared in Fantastic Four #33 (December 1964), and was created by Stan Lee (writer) and Jack Kirby (artist).

Attuma had a main role in the storyline Fear Itself as a member of the Serpent's Worthy, a group who were transformed by the Serpent's hammers. As part of the Worthy, Attuma is possessed by the Asgardian Nerkkod, whose persona he assumes.

Attuma appeared in the 2020 miniseries King in Black: Namor, a tie-in to the storyline King in Black.

== Fictional character biography ==
Attuma is part of the Skarka, a tribe of barbaric Atlanteans who were banished from Atlantis ages ago. For unknown reasons, Attuma was born with strength, endurance, and speed far superior to those of any normal Atlantean. Attuma quickly became leader of his tribe and declared that he would conquer the city of Atlantis as an ancient prophecy predicted.

When the ruling Council of Atlantis asks Namor to abdicate the throne, Namor obliges and leaves Atlantis. Attuma is hired with his men as mercenaries to end the ensuing civil war. Attuma ultimately takes control of Atlantis and kidnaps Marrina Smallwood, Namor's wife. Namor, with the help of Alpha Flight and the Avengers, frees Marrina and battles Attuma. Attuma ends the battle after realizing that Namor is happy with Marrina and does not want to return to Atlantis.

Attuma regains the throne of Atlantis after Namor is left too busy with the Defenders to protect Atlantis. Attuma forms the group Deep Six to defend Atlantis from Namor and the Defenders. Though outnumbered, the Defenders outsmart Attuma and Namor retakes Atlantis.

Attuma attacks New York City with an undersea horde once again. He is confronted by the Sentry, who beheads him. During the Dark Reign storyline, Attuma is resurrected by Doctor Doom, who reattaches his head to his body. Attuma is offered a new chance of power in the vow of destroying Namor once and for all.

=== Fear Itself ===
During the Fear Itself storyline, one of the seven Hammers of the Worthy lands near Attuma after it is launched to Earth by the Serpent. He is able to lift it and becomes Nerkodd, Breaker of Oceans. Nerkodd fights Alpha Flight after he tries to attack Vancouver, but he is defeated.

== Powers and abilities ==
Attuma possesses various superhuman abilities common to Atlanteans. However, his strength, stamina, resistance to physical injury, and swimming speed are much higher than the majority of his race. Like most Atlanteans, Attuma could not survive out of water for more than 10 minutes without the aid of mechanical devices or certain chemicals, for most of his life. His stamina, agility, and reflexes also were reduced when out of the water. Like all Atlanteans, his specially developed vision allows him to see clearly in the murky depths of the ocean.

After certain genetic and surgical enhancements following his resurrection at the hands of Doctor Doom, his strength has been fortified to be on par with the strength of Namor as well as granting him the ability of self-propelled flight and living on land unaided.

Attuma is a skilled Atlantean warrior, trained in the use of many different weapons. He is an expert hand-to-hand combatant, especially underwater, and has achieved mastery in the use of most Atlantean weapons. He usually prefers his three-pronged iron sword, but he has access to highly advanced weaponry.

== In other media ==
=== Television ===
- Attuma appears in the "Namor" segment of The Marvel Super Heroes.
- Attuma appears in the Fantastic Four (1967) episode "Danger in the Depths", voiced by Henry Corden.
- Attuma appears in The Avengers: United They Stand episode "To Rule Atlantis", voiced by Philip Akin.
- Attuma appears in the Fantastic Four: World's Greatest Heroes episode "Atlantis Attacks".
- Attuma appears in Avengers Assemble, voiced by Dwight Schultz in the first two seasons and by Dan Donohue in the fifth. This version is initially a member of the Red Skull's Cabal until the latter betrays them.
- Attuma appears in Ultimate Spider-Man, voiced again by Dwight Schultz.
- Attuma appears in Lego Marvel Avengers: Strange Tails, voiced by Roger Craig Smith.

=== Film ===
Attuma appears in Black Panther: Wakanda Forever, portrayed by Alex Livinalli. This version is a Talokanil warrior loyal to Namor who forms a rivalry with Okoye.

=== Video games ===
- Attuma appears as a boss in Fantastic Four (1997).
- Attuma appears as a boss in Marvel: Ultimate Alliance, voiced by Gregg Berger. This version is a member of the Masters of Evil.
- Attuma appears in Marvel Contest of Champions.
- Attuma appears in Lego Marvel Super Heroes 2.
- Attuma appears in Marvel Snap.

=== Miscellaneous ===
Attuma appears in the Marvel Rising motion comic, voiced again by Dan Donohue.
