= List of Avengers Assemble episodes =

Avengers Assemble is an animated television series based on the comic book super hero team known as the Avengers. It premiered on Disney XD on May 26, 2013.

As of February 24, 2019, 127 episodes of Avengers Assemble have aired.

On June 1, 2015, the series was renewed for a third season titled Avengers: Ultron Revolution, which premiered on Disney XD on March 13, 2016. It was renewed for a fourth season which is entitled Avengers: Secret Wars, and then a fifth and final season entitled Avengers: Black Panther's Quest.

== Series overview ==
| Season | Title | Episodes | Originally released | |
| Season | Title | Episodes | First released | Last released |
|---|---|---|---|---|
| 1 | – | 26 | May 26, 2013 | May 25, 2014 |
| 2 | – | 26 | September 28, 2014 | September 20, 2015 |
| 3 | Ultron Revolution | 26 | March 13, 2016 | January 28, 2017 |
| Shorts | – | 6 | June 2, 2017 | June 7, 2017 |
| 4 | Secret Wars | 26 | June 17, 2017 | March 11, 2018 |
| 5 | Black Panther's Quest | 23 | September 23, 2018 | February 24, 2019 |

== Episodes ==
=== Season 1 (2013–14) ===
The first season focuses on the Avengers reuniting after some time to defeat Red Skull and his newly formed team The Cabal, which consists of the Avengers' most powerful enemies, along with the help of new teenage S.H.I.E.L.D. recruit Sam Wilson (alias Falcon).

| No. overall | No. in season | Title | Directed by | Written by | Original release date | US viewers (millions) |
|---|---|---|---|---|---|---|
| 1 | 1 | "The Avengers Protocol" | Eric Radomski | Man of Action | May 26, 2013 | N/A |
| 2 | 2 | "The Avengers Protocol" | Eric Radomski | Man of Action | May 26, 2013 | N/A |
Part 1: After having been disbanded, the Avengers members Iron Man, Hulk, Thor, Hawkeye, and Black Widow reunite when the Red Skull (who is dying from the imperfections of his Super Soldier Serum) and MODOK kidnap Captain America during Hydra's attack on Liberty Island. With the aid of the new recruit Falcon, the heroes must come together once again to rescue Captain America before Red Skull can transfer his mind into Captain America's body. The Avengers succeed, but watch in horror as Red Skull and MODOK steal Tony Stark's armor. Part 2: The Avengers retreat back to Avengers Mansion to save Iron Man's life after his armor was stolen by Red Skull to keep him alive at the last minute of a successful battle. MODOK uses his technology to mind-control the Avengers causing them to attack each other. Meanwhile, Red Skull infiltrates the Avengers Mansion to carry out a devious plot that puts the entire city of Manhattan at risk. After Red Skull's failed mission destroys Avengers Mansion which causes the Avengers to relocate to Stark Tower, he invites multiple villains to join his Cabal.
| 3 | 3 | "Ghost of a Chance" | Jeff Allen | Man of Action & Paul Giacoppo | July 7, 2013 | N/A |
After the Avengers fall victim to the Space Phantoms, who impersonate them and trap them in Limbo, Falcon stands alone to save his team and stop the Phantoms' invasion of Earth.
| 4 | 4 | "The Serpent of Doom" | Tim Eldred | Man of Action | July 14, 2013 | N/A |
Thor believes he must sacrifice himself to save the world from Doctor Doom when he summons the Midgard Serpent using an Asgardian weapon stolen from Ulik.
| 5 | 5 | "Blood Feud" | Jeff Allen | Man of Action, Kevin Burke & Chris "Doc" Wyatt | July 21, 2013 | N/A |
The Avengers face off against Dracula and his vampire army after Dracula partially converts Black Widow into a vampire. The group are forced into a race against time to stop Black Widow from becoming a full vampiress.
| 6 | 6 | "Super Adaptoid" | Tim Eldred | Man of Action & Ed Valentine | July 28, 2013 | N/A |
The Avengers are out-gunned by the high-tech, power-mimicking Super-Adaptoid, who Justin Hammer created in an attempt to impress Red Skull enough to admit him into the Cabal. Captain America is the last man standing against the ultimate artificial intelligence.
| 7 | 7 | "Hyperion" | Jeff Allen | Man of Action & Jacob Semahn | August 4, 2013 | N/A |
An all-powerful super-being named Hyperion arrives to save Earth after helping the Avengers stop some meteors. But when his methods to keep peace on Earth becomes too extreme after he nearly kills Wrecker, the Avengers must stand up to him to saving humanity from total domination.
| 8 | 8 | "Molecule Kid" | Tim Eldred | Man of Action & Danielle Wolff | August 11, 2013 | N/A |
Hawkeye and Black Widow take on a covert S.H.I.E.L.D. mission to bringing in Molecule Man's son Aaron, but Nick Fury wants the mission to be kept private from Iron Man. When he is revealed to have Molecule Man's wand in his possession, they realized keeping their mission a secret may be a fatal mistake when A.I.M. agents, MODOK, and Super-Adaptoid target Aaron to harness his powers.
| 9 | 9 | "Depth Charge" | Jeff Allen | Man of Action & Jay Faerber | September 15, 2013 | 0.66 |
During a fight with a giant monster, Hulk discerns that something has caused it to run scared into Manhattan. An approaching tidal wave heralds that Attuma is trying to sink Manhattan with his army of Atlanteans. Hulk is forced to prove his strength or perish trying to prevent Manhattan from sinking.
| 10 | 10 | "The Doomstroyer" | Tim Eldred | Man of Action & Paul Giacoppo | September 22, 2013 | 0.70 |
While in Asgard, Doctor Doom takes command of the Destroyer armor. Thor has to convince the team to trust the one person who may be able to stop him, who turns out to be Loki.
| 11 | 11 | "Hulked Out Heroes" | Jeff Allen | Man of Action & Jacob Semahn | September 29, 2013 | 0.74 |
Red Skull and the Blood Brothers release a gamma virus that transforms the Avengers into Hulk-like monsters. The unlikely duo of Hulk and Black Widow is the last line of defense between the city and the Hulk-Vengers before the virus causes them to detonate.
| 12 | 12 | "Avengers: Impossible!" | Tim Eldred | Man of Action & Jacob Semahn | October 20, 2013 | 0.47 |
While on the run from the Chitauri, Impossible Man makes Falcon the star of his own action movie following their fight with the Wrecking Crew. Things get worse when a Chitauri scouting party arrives in search of him.
| 13 | 13 | "In Deep" | Jeff Allen | Man of Action, Kevin Burke & Chris "Doc" Wyatt | November 17, 2013 | 0.43 |
Iron Man and Captain America disguise themselves as Grim Reaper and Crossbones (whom the Avengers previously captured) to infiltrate Red Skull's Cabal. When their disagreements over strategy causes their cover to be blown, they are forced to take on the entire Cabal alone.
| 14 | 14 | "Hulk's Day Out" | Tim Eldred | Man of Action & Jay Faerber | November 24, 2013 | 0.46 |
When Hulk crash-lands on Earth with amnesia, Captain America, Hawkeye and Falcon reconstruct the previous day to find out what world-ending threat could have knocked him out. They encounter Thing, Spider-Man, and Glorian along the way. Meanwhile, Iron Man tries to figure out what is behind a storm that is affecting Earth and discovers the Badoon causing havoc.
| 15 | 15 | "Planet Doom" | Jeff Allen | Man of Action & Paul Giacoppo | December 8, 2013 | 0.49 |
After an argument with his father Odin, Thor briefly returns to Asgard after Heimdall reports that Midgard has disappeared from his vision. Thor finds the entire planet under the rule of Doctor Doom who has changed the past to ensure that the Avengers never formed. Thor must work with the Defenders to defeat Doctor Doom and restore the timeline.
| 16 | 16 | "Bring on the Bad Guys" | Tim Eldred | Man of Action & Eugene Son | February 16, 2014 | 0.53 |
While meeting with Attuma, Dracula, and MODOK, Red Skull decide that the Cabal needs to be more cooperative if they are going to be defeat the Avengers team. The Avengers starts to see how tough the Cabal is and how much strength they will need to take it down.
| 17 | 17 | "Savages" | Jeff Allen | Man of Action & Danielle Wolff | March 2, 2014 | 0.54 |
When Iron Man becomes too reliant on his own tech, Captain America challenges him to go without it for one full day. The challenge is accepted but made far more complicated when Stark takes them to the Savage Land. They discover Justin Hammer in his latest "get into the Cabal" scheme that involves mining the Savage Land for a Vibranium deposit. Stark must motivate a local pacifist Rock Tribe to take action.
| 18 | 18 | "Mojoworld" | Tim Eldred | Man of Action & Jacob Semahn | March 9, 2014 | 0.51 |
Hulk and Hawkeye suddenly find themselves stuck in a death match at the hands of the intergalactic broadcasting master Mojo and gain an unlikely ally in the robot Torgo.
| 19 | 19 | "The Ambassador" | Jeff Allen | Man of Action, Kevin Burke & Chris "Doc" Wyatt | March 16, 2014 | 0.57 |
The Avengers team puts their lives at risk to protect Doctor Doom from the Cabal, who target him as he is speaking at the United Nations due to his refusal to join them.
| 20 | 20 | "All Father's Day" | Tim Eldred | Man of Action & Jacob Semahn | March 23, 2014 | 0.58 |
Odin comes to Avengers Tower demanding that Thor ceases his "fun" on Midgard and return to Asgard. Thor promises that if he cannot prove the good he does on Earth, he will return home forever. Meanwhile, Mangog comes to Earth to get revenge on Odin.
| 21 | 21 | "By the Numbers" | Jeff Allen | Man of Action & Justin Peniston | March 30, 2014 | 0.60 |
The Avengers and the Cabal have a huge confrontation that leaves the team forever changed. Iron Man also learns that "the stats" cannot be trusted every time as there is no substitutes for human intuition. This even proves a point to Iron Man when the Avengers and the Cabal target the Tesseract.
| 22 | 22 | "Guardians & Space Knights" | Tim Eldred | Man of Action & Paul Giacoppo | April 6, 2014 | 0.52 |
When Galactus attacks Earth to consume it, Iron Man is able to lead him to another planet. The Avengers track Iron Man's location to a distant planet, which is populated by the D'Bari and under the protection of the Guardians of the Galaxy. As the D'Bari evacuate, the Avengers team and the Guardians of the Galaxy work to stop Galactus while wondering why Iron Man led Galactus to the D'Bari's planet.
| 23 | 23 | "One Little Thing" | Jeff Allen | Man of Action & Jacob Semahn | April 13, 2014 | 0.66 |
While Iron Man and Ant-Man are trying to stabilize Pym Particles that can shrink or grow matter, Falcon tells them that his mother Darlene is coming to visit and does not know that he is an Avenger. While Iron Man and Ant-Man work to round up the Pym Particles, the others have to help Falcon convince Darlene that he is still a S.H.I.E.L.D. liaison.
| 24 | 24 | "Crime and Circuses" | Tim Eldred | Man of Action & Danielle Wolff | May 11, 2014 | 0.66 |
When the Circus of Crime (consisting of Ringmaster, Strongman, the Great Gambonnos, Human Cannonball, and Trick Shot) rolls in to town, Hawkeye's dark past begins to surface and puts the Avengers in danger. When Ringmaster mind-controls the other Avengers except Falcon, Hawkeye learns that being honest to his teammates is more important than trying to hide his mistakes from his past. To combat the Circus of Crime, Hawkeye enlists former member Princess Python.
| 25 | 25 | "Exodus" | Jeff Allen | Man of Action & Jacob Semahn | May 18, 2014 | N/A |
Iron Man's confidence is shaken after he inadvertently puts Falcon in harm's way. When the Cabal pulls the trigger on its final plans, Iron Man has to put aside his personal dilemmas and become the leader he was born to be.
| 26 | 26 | "The Final Showdown" | Tim Eldred | Man of Action & Paul Giacoppo | May 25, 2014 | N/A |
With the Tesseract now in the hands of the Cosmic Skull, the world is in catastrophic peril. Iron Man realizes that working with the Cabal might be their only chance for a victory.

=== Season 2 (2014–15) ===
On July 26, 2014, the series was renewed for a second season; The first half of the second season deals with the team facing Thanos, as he competes with them to obtain the Infinity Gems, followed by a five-episode arc detailing the return of Ultron, who plans to exterminate the human race. The rest of the season details the debut of the Squadron Supreme and their confrontation with the Avengers. The last two episodes detail the escape of Thanos by the Black Order and their attack on Earth.

| No. overall | No. in season | Title | Directed by | Written by | Original release date | US viewers (millions) |
|---|---|---|---|---|---|---|
| 27 | 1 | "The Arsenal" | Tim Eldred | Kevin Burke & Chris "Doc" Wyatt | September 28, 2014 | N/A |
When Red Skull crash-lands on Earth with a fleet of alien ships chasing him, the Avengers learn of the existence of Thanos, a dangerous cosmic villain. After finding the Power Gem in Red Skull's possession, the Avengers team is led to a gamma-irradiated city to look for Arsenal.
| 28 | 2 | "Thanos Rising" | Phil Pignotti | Kevin Burke & Chris "Doc" Wyatt | October 5, 2014 | N/A |
With the help of Arsenal, the Avengers must stop Thanos from gaining the Infinity Gems. Their fight takes them to the Blue Area of the Moon, where Uatu the Watcher allows them to use his base to investigate Thanos.
| 29 | 3 | "Valhalla Can Wait" | Tim Eldred | Jacob Semahn | October 12, 2014 | N/A |
Loki manipulates the Hulk and Thor into traveling to Valhalla and battling to determine who is the strongest. But under Hela's rule, only the loser of their contest may return to Earth while the winner will become her consort and champion. Meanwhile, Loki uses Hela's horn to unleash an army of skeletons on Earth.
| 30 | 4 | "Ghosts of the Past" | Phil Pignotti | Todd Casey | October 26, 2014 | N/A |
Red Skull has information that could help the Avengers save the world from Thanos, but an intruder kidnaps Red Skull before they can retrieve it. Captain America discovers that the trespasser is his old partner Bucky Barnes (now the Winter Soldier) who is seeking revenge on Red Skull.
| 31 | 5 | "Beneath the Surface" | Tim Eldred | Paul Giacoppo | November 2, 2014 | N/A |
When Hawkeye and Black Widow stumble upon the Serpent Crown, they must work together with the Atlanteans led by Attuma's former adviser Lady Zartra to stop Attuma's battalion from destroying Atlantis and controlling the Atlantean beast Giganto.
| 32 | 6 | "Nighthawk" | Phil Pignotti | Todd Casey | November 9, 2014 | N/A |
When a mysterious new villain named Nighthawk uses the individualized counter measures Falcon created when he was at S.H.I.E.L.D. to take out the Avengers one by one, Falcon must figure out a way to save his team and even learns how he is connected to Hyperion.
| 33 | 7 | "The Age of Tony Stark" | Tim Eldred | Kevin Burke & Chris "Doc" Wyatt | November 16, 2014 | N/A |
When the Time Gem becomes attached to Tony Stark's arc reactor, it causes him to begin de-aging and brings dangers from other eras into present-day New York City. Things get worse when Red Skull is freed during the crisis and restored to his sanity.
| 34 | 8 | "Head to Head" | Phil Pignotti | Michael Ryan | January 25, 2015 | 0.57 |
After stopping A.I.M. from launching a missile, Iron Man thinks that the Avengers are almost perfect. When MODOK uses the Mind Gem to take control of S.H.I.E.L.D., the Avengers must work in each other's bodies when their minds are switched to defeat MODOK and claim the Mind Gem. Now its up to Hawkeye (in Thor's body) to convince Iron Man (in Hawkeye's body) that they have to become more than perfect.
| 35 | 9 | "The Dark Avengers" | Tim Eldred | Len Wein | February 1, 2015 | N/A |
In a flipped reality where superheroes are supervillains and vice versa, Iron Man gets a strange vision after battling the Squadron Supreme (consisting of Nighthawk, Hyperion, Power Princess, Doctor Spectrum, and Speed Demon). He and the "evil" versions of the other Avengers discover that the Squadron Supreme have the Reality Gem, and have used it to change the world in their image.
| 36 | 10 | "Back to the Learning Hall" | Phil Pignotti | Jacob Semahn | February 8, 2015 | N/A |
Thor is called into returning to Asgard as a guest to Asgard's Hall of Learning for the Learning Games as Hulk and Hawkeye follow him. The visions of Loki lure Thor, Hulk and Hawkeye into the chambers of the Learning Games, where failure is a one-way portal to Valhalla. Meanwhile, Loki uses the Space Gem to pull Earth and Asgard together, which would destroy them both.
| 37 | 11 | "Downgraded" | Tim Eldred | Danielle Wolff | February 15, 2015 | N/A |
After the Avengers stop the Wrecking Crew from using weaponry from an abandoned A.I.M. warehouse, Falcon shows Hawkeye his upgraded weaponry for the group. An Asgard rune transports them to Vanaheim. Once there, a Shadow Nyx drained the electricity from it and they are saved by Freya. Falcon must prove to himself and a skeptical Hawkeye that he's still a hero when preventing the Shadow Nyx from overtaking Vanaheim and restarting the great light that kept them at bay. As a result of Hawkeye and Falcon being transported to Vanaheim, two Shadow Nyx have appeared in Manhattan and the rest of the Avengers must keep them from draining Earth's energies.
| 38 | 12 | "Widow's Run" | Phil Pignotti | Eugene Son | February 22, 2015 | 0.82 |
Black Widow and Thor carry out a plan to rid the Earth of the Infinity Gems after the former has a vision of Iron Man using them to rule the planet. After an attempt to hide them in Asgard fails due to Black Widow's vision of Heimdall ruling Asgard, Black Widow and Thor are attacked by the Guardians of the Galaxy until the Avengers come to their aid. Afterwards, the Avengers are warned by Doctor Strange about the effects that the Gems are having on reality as Dormammu emerges from the portal. Black Widow harnesses the Gems' power to stop Dormammu before giving them up. Before the Gems can be taken to a safe location, Thanos returns and takes control of them.
| 39 | 13 | "Thanos Triumphant" | Tim Eldred | Kevin Burke & Chris "Doc" Wyatt | March 1, 2015 | 0.83 |
With the power of all five Infinity Gems, Thanos plans to wield his power over the Universe while the Avengers make a desperate attempt to stop him. The team is able to rebuild Arsenal and defeat Thanos. However, Arsenal is possessed by Ultron, who uses his energy-absorbing abilities to take the power of the Infinity Gauntlet for himself.
| 40 | 14 | "Crack in the System" | Phil Pignotti | Danielle Wolff | April 12, 2015 | N/A |
With the body of Arsenal and the power of the Infinity Gauntlet in his possession, Ultron begins his campaign against humanity by taking control of technology from Hammer Industries and A.I.M. To free Arsenal from Ultron's control, Iron Man works on a destroyer malware to deactivate Ultron. However, he is reluctant to completely destroy Ultron as doing so would also kill Arsenal, leading Ultron to recover and defeat him. At the end, Captain America leaves the Avengers after an argument with Tony.
| 41 | 15 | "Avengers Disassembled" | Tim Eldred | Jacob Semahn | April 19, 2015 | N/A |
After Captain America leaves the Avengers following Iron Man withholding recent information about Ultron, Roxxon is attacked by a rebuilt Super-Adaptoid who is being controlled by Ultron. The Avengers and Spider-Man fight Super-Adaptoid until Captain America arrives. Ultron takes control of the S.H.I.E.L.D. drop team of Life Model Decoys. Ultron takes control of Avengers Tower and Iron Man's Hall of Armors. When Ultron takes control over Stark's satellites to launch missiles, Iron Man destroys Avengers Tower and his tech to avoid it. The Avengers are divided into two teams: one led by Tony having Hawkeye and Thor on his side and the other led by Captain America having Black Widow, Hulk and Falcon on his side.
| 42 | 16 | "Small Time Heroes" | Phil Pignotti | Kevin Burke & Chris "Doc" Wyatt | April 26, 2015 | N/A |
Following the destruction of Avengers Tower, the Avengers are divided into two different teams, with Iron Man, Hawkeye and Thor struggling to fight Absorbing Man and Titania. Ant-Man helps Tony Stark repair his Iron Man armor and even helps his part of the Avengers when A.I.M. Agents steal the Pym Particles so that MODOK can use its powers to protect himself from Ultron.
| 43 | 17 | "Secret Avengers" | Tim Eldred | Paul Giacoppo | May 10, 2015 | N/A |
Captain America, Black Widow, Hulk, and Falcon (as the Secret Avengers) discover that working for S.H.I.E.L.D. isn't everything they hoped for when they are expected to unquestionably follow orders in a dangerous situation involving Crimson Dynamo and the Winter Guard. The Avengers and the Guard are ultimately forced to work together when the latter group's Hydra energy capsule destabilizes and threatens a nearby village.
| 44 | 18 | "The Ultron Outbreak" | Phil Pignotti | Kevin Burke & Chris "Doc" Wyatt | April 28, 2015 | N/A |
The Avengers reunite when Captain America and Iron Man learn to appreciate their differences while trying to save the world from ultimate destruction at the hands of Ultron who uses a special nano-virus to turn Falcon into a carrier to convert all humans into Ultron Sentinels. As Ant-Man works on a cure for the nano-virus after Falcon is detained, Captain America and Iron Man go after Ultron while the others attempts to slow down the infection. Arsenal sacrifices himself to send Ultron into the sun, while Thor rescues Iron Man. With the Avengers reunited, Captain America and Iron Man invite Ant-Man to their team.
| 45 | 19 | "The New Guy" | Tim Eldred | Charlotte Fullerton & Kevin Rubio | May 17, 2015 | N/A |
Since joining the Avengers following the defeat of Ultron, Ant-Man (revealed to be Scott Lang) has helped them by taking out Fin Fang Foom. Under Captain America's suggestion, Hawkeye puts Ant-Man through an Avengers training course on Monster Isle to determine if he is cut out to be a member of the Avengers. Captain America, Hawkeye and Ant-Man are unaware that Red Skull and the Mindless Ones are nearby planning to cloak himself from Thanos using Dormammu's powers.
| 46 | 20 | "Terminal Velocity" | Phil Pignotti | Jacob Semahn | July 5, 2015 | 0.38 |
The Squadron Supreme's fastest member Speed Demon is on the loose and wreaking havoc throughout Avengers Tower. Hulk must save the day by fighting the Speed Demon while the other Avengers fight Hyperion.
| 47 | 21 | "Spectrums" | Tim Eldred | Danielle Wolff | July 12, 2015 | 0.34 |
Ant-Man begins to atone by bringing his former allies to justice, starting with reclaiming his technology from Whirlwind. His quest for redemption leads him and the team to a battle with Doctor Spectrum, as he is assisted in battle by Captain America, Iron Man, and Thor. During the battle, Spectrum uses his powers to manifest nightmarish versions of Ultron, Loki and Winter Soldier to attack Iron Man, Thor, and Captain America. Meanwhile, the others enter Hyperion's sunken citadel and learn that Spectrum's Power Prism is sentient and controlling him.
| 48 | 22 | "Midgard Crisis" | Phil Pignotti | Paul Giacoppo | July 19, 2015 | 0.52 |
Thor is convinced that Zarda wants to defect from Squadron Supreme, but Hulk knows better and must protect Thor from Zarda's duplicitous ways.
| 49 | 23 | "Avengers' Last Stand" | Tim Eldred | Eugene Son | July 26, 2015 | N/A |
Falcon tries to prove he can be a leader when the Squadron Supreme enacts their end game and kidnaps Captain America and Iron Man. Things become even more difficult when the Avengers discover the Squadron Supreme's last few plots were all part of an even bigger plan to revive their sixth member, Nuke.
| 50 | 24 | "Avengers Underground" | Phil Pignotti | Danielle Wolff | August 2, 2015 | 0.58 |
As the Squadron Supreme take over Earth, the Avengers go into hiding and develop a plan to save the planet and stop the Squadron. In desperation as part of his contingency plan, Nighthawk has Hyperion absorb Nuke's powers and orders him to destroy the planet by blowing up its core.
| 51 | 25 | "New Frontiers" | Tim Eldred | Kevin Burke & Chris "Doc" Wyatt | September 13, 2015 | 0.47 |
The Black Order (consisting of Corvus Glaive, Proxima Midnight, Ebony Maw, Black Dwarf, and Supergiant) has infiltrated a special prison and freed their master Thanos. When Jeter Kan Too of New Korbin begs the Avengers to save them from mysterious invaders, the team discovers that Thanos and his Black Order are plundering New Korbin. Meanwhile, Tony seeks new challenges for the team.
| 52 | 26 | "Avengers World" | Phil Pignotti | Kevin Burke & Chris "Doc" Wyatt | September 20, 2015 | 0.52 |
When Thanos and the Black Order attack Earth, they finally plan to take over the planet by destroying the Avengers. The Avengers discovers they are more than eight heroes....The Avengers are an ideal.

=== Season 3: Ultron Revolution (2016–17) ===
Ultron returns after his apparent demise and seeks revenge on the Avengers. The Avengers must defeat him as well as new threats like Baron Zemo's Masters of Evil and Kang the Conqueror. Vision, Black Panther, Captain Marvel, and Ms. Marvel make appearances in this season. The storyline features an adaptation of the Civil War comics storyline. Season three premiered on Disney XD on March 13, 2016.

| No. overall | No. in season | Title | Directed by | Written by | Original release date | Prod. code | US viewers (millions) |
|---|---|---|---|---|---|---|---|
| 53 | 1 | "Adapting to Change" | Phil Pignotti | Eugene Son | March 13, 2016 | 301 | 0.39 |
Following a fight with the Masters of Evil members Beetle, Goliath, and Screaming Mimi, the Avengers learn what it is like to work as a team again as they infiltrate A.I.M. and battle Adaptoids developed by A.I.M.'s Scientist Supreme. After A.I.M. is defeated, Ultron merges with the Adaptoids to form a new body for himself.
| 54 | 2 | "The Ultimates" | Tim Eldred | Danielle Wolff | March 20, 2016 | 302 | 0.41 |
After absorbing the remnants of the space metal used for the Scientist Supreme's Adaptoids, Ultron returns and plans to replace humanity with robots starting with duplicates of the Avengers known as Ultimates. The Avengers must work in a way that they can defeat the Ultimates while fending off Ultron.
| 55 | 3 | "Saving Captain Rogers" | Phil Pignotti | Mairghread Scott | March 27, 2016 | 303 | 0.40 |
Iron Man and Black Widow head out to find Captain America when he goes missing from Avengers Tower. In Europe, Captain America battles to rescue Bucky who has been captured by Heinrich Zemo. In reality, Zemo has hypnotized Captain America into finding his father's laboratory so that he can find the two super-soldier serums that he perfected.
| 56 | 4 | "Under Siege" | Tim Eldred | Matt Wayne | April 3, 2016 | 304 | 0.38 |
While the Avengers are investigating one of Baron Helmut Zemo's possible hideout somewhere in South America, Hawkeye is left to defend Avengers Tower from Zemo, who has taken the Masters of Evil members Beetle, Fixer, Goliath, Moonstone, and Screaming Mimi under his leadership.
| 57 | 5 | "The Thunderbolts" | Phil Pignotti | Mark Hoffmeier | April 10, 2016 | 305 | 0.46 |
The Avengers fight to stop Justin Hammer's new weapons factories, but are both helped and hindered by a mysterious new team of heroes known as the Thunderbolts ever since they helped to stop the stimuloid Growing Man.
| 58 | 6 | "Thunderbolts Revealed" | Tim Eldred | Kevin Shinick | April 17, 2016 | 306 | 0.47 |
Still suspicious about the Thunderbolts following a fight with Klaw, Hawkeye spies on them and discovers that they are actually Helmut Zemo and the Masters of Evil, using an Inversion Stabilizer they stole from Stark Industries to disguise themselves in a plot to outshine the Avengers. When Hawkeye tells the other Avengers about this, the rest of the Thunderbolts must decide on whether they should continue to work with Zemo or help the Avengers stop him.
| 59 | 7 | "Into the Dark Dimension" | Phil Pignotti | Danielle Wolff | April 24, 2016 | 307 | 0.48 |
On Halloween, Doctor Strange comes to Iron Man, Hulk, and Thor for help when Mindless Ones and demons from the Dark Dimension appear on Earth. When Dormammu briefly appears near Stark Industries' Arc Reactor, he manages to steal the Eye of Agamotto from Strange. Iron Man and Strange must put aside their differences in science and magic to reclaim the Eye of Agamotto and defeat Dormammu before he can conquer Earth and other dimensions. Note: This episode was originally set to air in October, but was pushed back for unknown reasons.
| 60 | 8 | "Dehulked" | Tim Eldred | Paul Giacoppo | May 1, 2016 | 308 | 0.45 |
Bruce Banner's former colleague Igor Drenkov leads the Steelcorps in stealing technology from Stark Industries and uses an energy-draining weapon on Hulk. Now powerless, Bruce uses a powered armor to help the Avengers stop Drenkov from becoming a gamma-powered hero himself.
| 61 | 9 | "Inhumans Among Us" | Phil Pignotti | Paul Dini | July 24, 2016 | 309 | 0.41 |
When the townspeople of Maple Falls are frightened by the sudden appearance of Alpha Primitives from a crashed ship, the Avengers attempt to help them but put themselves into conflict with the Inhumans Black Bolt, Medusa, Gorgon, Karnak, Lockjaw, and Seeker. While Hulk and Lockjaw work to get the Terrigen Crystal for a device that will help dispose of the Terrigen Mist that drove the Alpha Primitives crazy, the Avengers and Inhumans must work together to deal with the recently-emerged Inhuman Inferno.
| 62 | 10 | "The Inhuman Condition" | Tim Eldred | Tom Pugsley | July 31, 2016 | 310 | 0.35 |
Lockjaw brings the Avengers to Attilan when most of the Inhuman Royal Family has been captured. The Avengers and Black Bolt discover that Ultron is behind the capture of the Inhumans. After phase-shifting Seeker, Ultron begins his next plot to eliminate humanity using Black Bolt as a power source. The Avengers must free the Inhumans and stop Ultron before he uses his dangerous weapon onto the Earth.
| 63 | 11 | "The Kids Are Alright" | Phil Pignotti | Eugene Son | August 7, 2016 | 311 | 0.48 |
Captain America and Iron Man join forces with Inferno and a new Inhuman named Ms. Marvel when they fight a stray Ultron robot. While giving Inferno and Ms. Marvel a tour of Avengers Tower, they end up dealing with Iron Man's old enemy Ghost, whose awakened Inhuman abilities have given him the innate ability to become intangible. Ghost plans to steal F.R.I.D.A.Y. while disabling each of the Avengers one-by-one.
| 64 | 12 | "The Conqueror" | Tim Eldred | Stan Berkowitz | August 14, 2016 | 312 | 0.43 |
The Avengers try to stop A.I.M. from stealing high-tech weapons from the future ever since it was discovered that they upgraded the gear of Whiplash and Spymaster. Their fight with A.I.M. attracts the attention of the 30th-century warlord Kang the Conqueror since it was his technology that A.I.M. used as he takes control of the A.I.M. agents present.
| 65 | 13 | "Into the Future" | Phil Pignotti | Danielle Wolff | August 21, 2016 | 313 | N/A |
With the exception of Thor, the Avengers become trapped in the 30th century which Kang the Conqueror rules over. With the help of an elderly Thor, a future version of Black Widow named Layla, and the local rebels, the Avengers try to beat the future robots of Kang the Conqueror.
| 66 | 14 | "Seeing Double" | Tim Eldred | Jacob Semahn | August 28, 2016 | 314 | N/A |
After Hulk and Black Widow defeat Abomination, Hulk is ambushed and captured by Hydra agents. Upon alerting Captain America and Iron Man upon trailing the Hydra agents to Siberia, Black Widow discovers that Baron Strucker has reactivated the Red Room program. Black Widow also discovers that Strucker is using the Winter Soldier program to turn Hulk into the Winter Hulk.
| 67 | 15 | "A Friend in Need" | Phil Pignotti | Mark Banker | September 11, 2016 | 315 | N/A |
Vision assists the Avengers in their fight against Cobalt Man. Afterwards, Vision takes friendship lessons from Thor who takes him to Asgard to show how his friends helped him in defeating Ulik, Harokin, Fenris Wolf, Fafnir, and Loki. After Ulik briefly breaks out, Vision ends up taken over by Ultron until Vision fights his control enough for Ultron to take control of the Destroyer Armor. When Ultron in the Destroyer arrives on Earth, Vision must help the Avengers defeat Ultron.
| 68 | 16 | "Captain Marvel" | Tim Eldred | Rick Williams & Jenna McGrath | September 18, 2016 | 316 | N/A |
Captain America, Thor, and Falcon join Captain Marvel in battling Kree soldiers led by Galen-Kor, who are planning to give the Inhumans to the Kree Empire. In the process, they stop the group from releasing a dangerous gas on Earth.
| 69 | 17 | "Panther's Rage" | Micah Gunnell | Eugene Son | September 25, 2016 | 317 | 0.37 |
As T'Challa speaks before an assembly, Captain America protects the assembly from Crossbones who has been hired to assassinate T'Challa. After helping Captain America take out Crossbones, T'Challa makes off with Captain America's shield, claiming it was stolen property. In an attempt to get it back, Captain America leads Iron Man, Thor, and Hawkeye to Wakanda to confront Black Panther who claims that Howard Stark stole the Vibranium to make Captain America's shield. When a reassembled Klaw targets the Vibranium, Black Panther must put his differences aside so that he and Dora Milaje member Aneka can help the Avengers fight Klaw.
| 70 | 18 | "Ant-Man Makes It Big" | Tim Eldred | Dani Michaeli | October 2, 2016 | 318 | N/A |
On the set of the superhero film Human Ant and the Revengers, Hawkeye and Black Widow team up with Ant-Man to stop the disgruntled prop master Egghead from destroying Los Angeles. Meanwhile, Thor takes actor Tad McDodd, who is portraying Viking King, to see what it was like to be Thor.
| 71 | 19 | "The House of Zemo" | Micah Gunnell | Paul Giacoppo | October 9, 2016 | 319 | 0.42 |
While trying to recall the images of his father for his painting, Captain America is tipped off about suspicious activities at the docks. Once there, Captain America discovers that Helmut Zemo has returned and has used Kang the Conqueror's technology to bring his father Heinrich from 1943 to the present to restore the honor of the House of Zemo. During the battle between the Avengers and the Zemos, Hawkeye, Black Widow, and Falcon are sent to 1943, where they work with a younger Steve Rogers to make an antenna that would signal the time machine. At the same time, the others battle Zemo's descendant from the year 2099.
| 72 | 20 | "U-Foes" | Tim Eldred | Mairghread Scott | November 6, 2016 | 320 | N/A |
The President of the United States has signed the New Powers Act in response to the Terrigen Fog creating new Inhumans and Truman Marsh is assigned to be the Avengers' liaison to the government. Meanwhile, scientists backed by Hydra enter a gamma storm with a stolen spaceship and are transformed into the U-Foes, who plan to take over Hydra in Baron Strucker's absence.
| 73 | 21 | "Building the Perfect Weapon" | Micah Gunnell | Stan Berkowitz | November 13, 2016 | 321 | N/A |
Following Truman Marsh replacing Hulk with Red Hulk, the Avengers fight off an invasion of Rock Trolls. Afterwards, the Avengers must stop Leader from building and unleashing his secret weapon with stolen A.I.M. technology even when he uses Ultimo on them. Meanwhile, Hulk is given an obedience collar and wanders around while figuring out what to do next.
| 74 | 22 | "World War Hulk" | Tim Eldred | Jacob Semahn | November 20, 2016 | 322 | N/A |
The Leader uses a particle-accelerating gamma bomb to turn Red Hulk into an "ultimate weapon", but loses control of him. As the Avengers fight him, the Hulk wanders around the wilderness while Bruce Banner mentally advises him. Ultimately, Hulk returns to the Avengers and defeats the Red Hulk by draining his energy. However, this causes him to mutate into a monstrous grey form before Bruce calms him down.
| 75 | 23 | "Civil War" | Micah Gunnell | Danielle Wolff Elliott Casey Eugene Son | January 28, 2017 | 323 | N/A |
| 78 | 26 | "Civil War" | Tim Eldred | Danielle Wolff Elliott Casey Eugene Son | January 28, 2017 | 326 | N/A |
Part 1: The Fall of Attilan: When Maximus attacks a whole city, Truman Marsh decides to have all Inhumans hunted down and registered. When Maximus gets Inferno angry, he loses control of his powers and Attilan burns to the ground. The Avengers then decide to help get all Inhumans registered while working to defeat Maximus. Part 2: The Mighty Avengers: When the Avengers let the Inhuman Iso escape from them without being registered, Truman Marsh gets angry and the Avengers quit working for him. Marsh then forms a new Avengers team called The Mighty Avengers (consisting of Red Hulk, Captain Marvel, Vision, Ms. Marvel, Black Panther, Ant-Man, and Songbird) to go and hunt down the Inhumans while also thwarting Baron Strucker's plot. But when the Avengers get in the way at the hiding place of Iso, Flint, and Haechi, they are forced to battle. Songbird joins the original Avengers, but they are arrested as Black Widow escapes. Part 3: The Drums of War: The Avengers are broken out of jail by Black Widow and they are joined by Black Bolt and Medusa. However, the registration disks are revealed to be mind-controlling the Inhumans and Marsh revealed to be Ultron in disguise. Part 4: Avengers Revolution: Ultron attacks New York and all the Avengers (new and old) go to stop him. Ultron uses all the Inhumans to attack the humans of Earth so that only he and his robot army will be left. The Avengers go to regroup at Doctor Strange's Sanctum Sanctorum. Ant-Man and Iron Man have a way to disable the registration disks and some of the other Avengers go to fight Ultron and the others go with Iron Man and Ant-Man. Ant-Man and Iron Man are quickly working on a solution, but not before they are found by the Inhumans. They send the others to fight them while they work. Iron Man and Ant-Man find a solution and test it on Inferno, and it works. Ultron possesses Iron Man's armor, leading him to sacrifice himself by moving to a dimension where technology does not work.

=== Season 4: Secret Wars (2017–18) ===
This season deals with the Avengers being scattered across time and space by a new incarnation of the Cabal as Black Panther assembles another incarnation of the Avengers to find them in time to save the universe.

| No. overall | No. in season | Title | Directed by | Written by | Original release date | Prod. code | US viewers (millions) |
|---|---|---|---|---|---|---|---|
| 79 | 1 | "...Assemble" | Micah Gunnell | Eugene Son | August 8, 2017 | 401 | N/A |
Compilation of "Teaser", "Black Panther", "Captain Marvel", "Ant-Man and Wasp", "Vision", and "Ms. Marvel" shorts.
| 80 | 2 | "Avengers No More" | Tim Eldred; Micah Gunnell | Elliott Casey; Gavin Hignight | June 17, 2017 | 404 | 0.21 |
| 81 | 3 | "Avengers No More" | Tim Eldred; Micah Gunnell | Elliott Casey; Gavin Hignight | June 17, 2017 | 405 | 0.21 |
Part 1: As the Avengers find a way to return Iron Man to their reality without bringing Ultron along, they managed to prevent Ghost from stealing Stark Industries technology at the Stark Expo monitored by Stark Industries' cross-dimensional research scientist Jane Foster whom Thor takes a liking to. After swiping the prototype Arc Reactor, Leader heads to the Wakandan Consulate to steal the Vibranium there with his army of Humanoids. When a guilt-ridden Thor helps Black Panther take down Leader when the Avengers arrive, Leader summons his new incarnation of the Cabal (consisting of Arnim Zola, Enchantress, Executioner, and Kang the Conqueror) to fight the Avengers while taking advantage of Iron Man's absence. Part 2: After the Cabal uses their static expander to scatter the Avengers across time and space, Black Panther escapes with the stolen Vibranium and avoids Executioner to get a team to help him. Upon awakening Vision who helps him fight Executioner and his pet wolf as well as Enchantress reclaiming the Vibranium for Leader, Black Panther and Vision must lead Ant-Man, Captain Marvel, Ms. Marvel, and Wasp (as the All-New, All-Different Avengers) into finding the Avengers so that they can stop the Cabal.
| 82 | 4 | "The Sleeper Awakens" | Tim Eldred | Henry Gilroy | August 27, 2017 | 406 | N/A |
After the Avengers disappear, Black Panther brings the New Avengers to his new mansion. They find Captain America alive, but Vision discovers that he is a robot sent by Red Skull, who called the New Avengers for help when his new A.I. system in the Sleeper turns on him. Vision befriends a robot clone of the Red Skull who later sacrifices himself to stop the real Skull's EMP.
| 83 | 5 | "Prison Break" | Micah Gunnell | Danielle Wolff | August 27, 2017 | 407 | N/A |
Yelena Belova allies with Zarda and Typhoid Mary in a plot to spring all the inmates at the Vault. Only Captain Marvel and Wasp can stop this escape.
| 84 | 6 | "The Incredible Herc" | Tim Eldred | Geoffrey Thorne | August 27, 2017 | 408 | N/A |
Hercules shows up on Earth wanting to be a member of the New Avengers. However, it turns out he is hiding from Ares who is seeking to steal the key to Tartarus from him. At the same time, Captain Marvel and Black Panther argue over leadership of the new team.
| 85 | 7 | "Show Your Work" | Micah Gunnell | Zach Craley | August 27, 2017 | 409 | N/A |
Taskmaster reluctantly allies himself with the New Avengers to stop MODOK from repopulating the Earth with his clones. At the same time, he tries to teach Ms. Marvel how to take shortcuts in life against Vision's judgement.
| 86 | 8 | "Sneakers" | Tim Eldred | Shaene Siders | August 27, 2017 | 410 | N/A |
Ant-Man and Black Panther jet off to Wakanda when Baron Helmut Zemo goes after a powerful relic hidden away by Black Panther's father T'Chaka and Heinrich Zemo.
| 87 | 9 | "Why I Hate Halloween" | Micah Gunnell | Geoffrey Thorne | October 8, 2017 | 403 | N/A |
On Halloween, the Avengers raid an underground Hydra base, where they find that its scientist Whitney Frost has been doing experiments related to vampires. After taking her to the safe house named "Beach House" in Vermont while the others fight the attacking vampires, Hawkeye must protect Frost from the vengeful forces of Dracula and his vampires even when Crossbones and Crimson Widow show up to reclaim her. Note: Wynn Everett reprises her role of Whitney Frost from Agent Carter.
| 88 | 10 | "The Once and Future Kang" | Micah Gunnell | Shannon Denton | October 15, 2017 | 411 | N/A |
After Jane Foster locates the Avengers, she provides the New Avengers with special tether bracelets to rescue the Avengers from a location overseen by the Cabal. Vision and Wasp head to the future to save Falcon, who has joined forces with Kang the Conqueror. They must work with the rebels led by a future version of Red Hulk to free Falcon from Kang's control. Note: From this episode onwards, Falcon's appearance and suit resembles his Marvel Cinematic Universe counterpart.
| 89 | 11 | "Dimension Z" | Tim Eldred | Geoffrey Thorne | October 15, 2017 | 412 | N/A |
Ant-Man travels to another dimension called Dimension Z to rescue Black Widow, Captain America, and Hawkeye from Arnim Zola, brainwashed operatives, and a group of Doughboys.
| 90 | 12 | "The Most Dangerous Hunt" | Micah Gunnell | Henry Gilroy | October 22, 2017 | 413 | N/A |
The Executioner chains Black Panther and Hulk together, ties the latter's transformations to a crystal embedded in his axe, and strands them in Asgard. While making their way across Asgard to access the Bifröst, they must avoid Executioner, Ulik and a fellow Rock Troll, and a group of Goblins.
| 91 | 13 | "Under the Spell of the Enchantress" | Tim Eldred | Eugene Son | October 22, 2017 | 414 | 0.25 |
Captain Marvel and Ms. Marvel travel to an icy asteroid to rescue Thor from the Enchantress. They fight Enchantress who has brainwashed Thor to be her bodyguard as well as fighting brainwashed warriors and monstrous snowmen.
| 92 | 14 | "The Return" | Micah Gunnell | Danielle Wolff | October 22, 2017 | 415 | 0.16 |
After returning to Earth, the Avengers and the New Avengers discover the Earth has been taken over by Loki who used the Casket of Ancient Winters and is revealed to be the true leader of the Cabal. The Avengers and the New Avengers must fight Loki and his army of Frost Trolls while preventing the World Breaker ships above Manhattan from destroying Earth.
| 93 | 15 | "New Year's Resolution" | Tim Eldred | Danielle Wolff | December 3, 2017 | 402 | 0.40 |
Past and present collide on New Year's Eve as Howard Stark, Peggy Carter, and Doctor Faustus are transported to the present day from 1949. They team up with Iron Man and Captain America to save the time stream from Kang the Conqueror, who seeks to eliminate Howard or Tony Stark to prevent Iron Man 2020 from existing. Note: Hayley Atwell reprises her role as Peggy Carter from the Marvel Cinematic Universe.
| 94 | 16 | "The Eye of Agamotto" | Tim Eldred; Micah Gunnell | Michael Vogel; Gavin Hignight | January 7, 2018 | 416 | N/A |
| 95 | 17 | "The Eye of Agamotto" | Tim Eldred; Micah Gunnell | Michael Vogel; Gavin Hignight | January 7, 2018 | 417 | N/A |
Part 1: The Avengers and the New Avengers fight Hydra when they break into a S.H.I.E.L.D. warehouse filled with magical items and make off with a specific talisman. To find where the talisman is taken, the Avengers and the New Avengers split into two groups. Captain America and Black Panther head to Hong Kong, where they find Baron Mordo working on the Talisman of Kaluu. Meanwhile, Black Panther's sister Shuri catches up to Black Panther and Captain America wanting to do more for Wakanda. Part 2: Following Baron Mordo's defeat, the mysterious person who trapped him in another dimension needs help seeking Doctor Strange as Captain America and Black Panther give him a ride back to the Avengers Compound, where Doctor Strange suddenly attacks them. He identifies the mysterious person as Agamotto who plans to take back the Eye of Agamotto and cleanse all of Earth of its chaos. He starts by using a shadow curse to take control of Captain America, Black Panther, Hawkeye, and Ms. Marvel. Now Doctor Strange and Hulk must find a way to defeat Agamotto.
| 96 | 18 | "Beyond" | Tim Eldred | Geoffrey Thorne | January 14, 2018 | 418 | N/A |
After the Avengers are transported to a strange new world called Battleworld and find Avengers Tower rebuilt in the domain of Egyptia, they meet the Beyonder who states that they are here for his "experiment." While exploring Egyptia, Captain America and Black Widow reunite with Iron Man, who the Beyonder retrieved from his dimension. In a pyramid in Egyptia, Captain America, Black Widow, and Iron Man battle Moon Knight and an army of mummies with sand-based abilities.
| 97 | 19 | "Underworld" | Micah Gunnell | Eugene Son | January 14, 2018 | 419 | N/A |
Loki appears at Avengers Tower, wanting the Avengers to get him to Earth as Beyonder took parts of Asgard. As they search for the Bifröst when exploring Battleworld, Thor, Hulk, and Loki must battle the Enchantress as well as Rock Trolls from Nidavellir and unnamed slithering creatures. The Beyonder separates the Hulk and Bruce Banner and sends them to different domains of Battleworld.
| 98 | 20 | "The Immortal Weapon" | Tim Eldred | Trevor Devall | January 14, 2018 | 420 | N/A |
Iron Man and Loki begin rebuilding Bifröst. While trying to retrieve Heimdall's sword from K'un-Lun, Black Panther and Falcon team up with Iron Fist to overcome Dracula and his vampires. In addition, Dracula plans to head to a far-off Battleworld domain to retrieve more symbiotes and empower his vampire army.
| 99 | 21 | "The Vibranium Coast" | Micah Gunnell | Zach Craley | January 14, 2018 | 421 | N/A |
As Iron Man and Loki continue rebuilding Bifröst, Ant-Man and Ms. Marvel are sent to the Red Skull Sea to retrieve Vibranium. While at the Red Skull Sea, Ant-Man and Ms. Marvel reluctantly work with a pirate version of Typhoid Mary to battle the evil pirate Dread Skull, his first-mate Crossbones, and an army of Skullbots.
| 100 | 22 | "Weirdworld" | Tim Eldred | Danielle Wolff | March 4, 2018 | 422 | N/A |
In the Battleworld domain of Weirdworld, Black Widow and Captain Marvel find that Bruce Banner is working with Morgan le Fay to hunt down the Hulk. However, they eventually learn that Morgan is planning to harness the Hulk's power to take over Battleworld. In response, Bruce reconciles with Hulk and re-fuses with him to stop Morgan.
| 101 | 23 | "Westland" | Micah Gunnell | Geoffrey Thorne | March 4, 2018 | 423 | N/A |
Hawkeye, Vision, Loki, and Wasp head to Westland, an old west domain to find Doctor Strange. They find him working as their doctor in the midst of an attack by a Kree Conquest Hive, where Hawkeye is temporarily blinded. After running into Rocket Raccoon and Groot after their ship crashed, Vision finds Jane Foster who has been operating as Westland's sheriff under the alias of "Calamity Jane Foster."
| 102 | 24 | "The Citadel" | Tim Eldred | Danielle Wolff | March 11, 2018 | 424 | N/A |
Captain America and Iron Man are captured by the Beyonder and the villain team he has assembled from Absorbing Man, Ares, Crimson Widow, and MODOK. While Captain America works to evade the villains in Beyonder's lair, Iron Man is shown by Beyonder the truth of his experiment.
| 103 | 25 | "The Wastelands" | Micah Gunnell | Eugene Son | March 11, 2018 | 425 | N/A |
Before they can use Bifröst to undo Battleworld, the Avengers must defeat Ares and an army of Ghost Riders. As Doctor Strange and Loki work on Bifröst, Thor gives Mjolnir to Jane Foster, transforming her into a new version of Thor.
| 104 | 26 | "All Things Must End" | Tim Eldred | Eugene Son | March 11, 2018 | 426 | N/A |
After Loki becomes the Sorcerer Supreme following Beyonder's defeat, the Avengers are the only force standing between him and the domination of the universe even after he defeated Odin. While the Avengers and the New Avengers fight an army of Mindless Ones, Doctor Strange and Jane Foster rescue Thor even when Loki unleashes the All Dark.

=== Season 5: Black Panther's Quest (2018–19) ===
On July 22, 2017, Avengers Assemble was renewed for a fifth and final season titled Avengers: Black Panther's Quest centering around Black Panther, and featuring a new animation style. However, unlike the previous seasons which shared continuity with Ultimate Spider-Man and Hulk and the Agents of S.M.A.S.H., this one shares continuity with the 2017 Spider-Man animated series and Guardians of the Galaxy.

| No. overall | No. in season | Title | Directed by | Written by | Original release date | Prod. code | US viewers (millions) |
|---|---|---|---|---|---|---|---|
| 105 | 1 | "Shadow of Atlantis" | Micah Gunnell; Tim Eldred | Geoffrey Thorne | September 23, 2018 | 501 | 0.15 |
| 106 | 2 | "Shadow of Atlantis" | Micah Gunnell; Tim Eldred | Geoffrey Thorne | September 23, 2018 | 502 | 0.15 |
Part 1: Black Panther holds a party to give the Avengers and their guests a formal introduction of Shuri until Attuma's general Tiger Shark attacks. When Tiger Shark blows the Horn of Neptune, it summons a sea monster as Thor, Captain Marvel, and Ms. Marvel work to keep it from destroying the bridge. Part 2: As the Avengers fight the straggling Atlantean soldiers, Tiger Shark has invaded the Wakandan embassy as Black Panther rescues Shuri from him. After the Avengers take down some of his followers, Tiger Shark makes his way to the embassy to steal a jar for his mysterious benefactor.
| 107 | 3 | "Into the Deep" | Micah Gunnell | Eugene Son | September 30, 2018 | 503 | N/A |
Suspicious of Attuma following Tiger Shark's defeat, Black Panther and Shuri go on a dangerous mission to Atlantis. As Black Panther infiltrates the palace to get answers from an imprisoned Tiger Shark on why he was after a Wakandan crest, Shuri mingles with the diplomats. She runs into Wakanda's ambassador N'Jadaka, who has a secret agenda that Black Panther and Attuma do not know about.
| 108 | 4 | "The Panther and the Wolf" | Tim Eldred | Eugene Son | October 7, 2018 | 504 | N/A |
Black Panther and Shuri return to Wakanda to look for other enemies in light of N'Jadaka and Tiger Shark being associated with the Shadow Council. They run into Black Panther's adopted brother White Wolf who is said to have a list of Shadow Council operatives. As Black Panther chases after him, they are attacked by M'Baku and his mercenaries who have allied with the Shadow Council.
| 109 | 5 | "The Zemo Sanction" | Micah Gunnell | Akela Cooper | October 14, 2018 | 505 | N/A |
After apprehending the Wakandan N'Basa who is on the Shadow Council's side, Black Panther informs Captain America in a transmission that Baron Zemo was a member of the Shadow Council in the 1940s. Tracking Zemo to Château le Fay in Switzerland, Black Panther finds that he is planning to destroy his father's files before it falls into the wrong hands. Both of them must work together when Tiger Shark targets the files for the Shadow Council.
| 110 | 6 | "Mists of Attilan" | Tim Eldred | Eugene Son | October 21, 2018 | 506 | N/A |
After he and the Dora Milaje thwart Crossbones' plan to invade Wakanda, Black Panther brings Ms. Marvel on a mission to Attilan. Due to T'Challa's grandfather T'Chanda previously making a promise to them, Black Bolt and Medusa are reluctant to give up the claw piece of a key. The three must also deal with Shadow Council member Princess Zanda.
| 111 | 7 | "T'Challa Royale" | Micah Gunnell | Mark Henry | October 28, 2018 | 507 | N/A |
As Baron Zemo continues to decrypt his father's files, T'Challa finds that Wakanda's computers have been hacked and traces it to Pele Pele which T'Chaka and N'Jadaka could not develop due to volcanic activities. Upon arrival, he is hunted by Kraven the Hunter as part of the latest episode of Kraven's Amazing Hunt. Meanwhile, Shuri and Zemo work to eliminate the Shadow Council's virus from Wakanda's computer systems.
| 112 | 8 | "The Night Has Wings" | Tim Eldred | Zach Craley | November 4, 2018 | 508 | N/A |
After attending an event held by Tony Stark that followed him thwarting Crossbones' bank robbery, Black Panther answers a distress signal at a Wakandan village that has been attacked by a group of monsters called the Kawulo. Black Panther discovers that Klaw is behind the attacks with the help of some mercenaries and mutated bats, controlling the latter using special collars.
| 113 | 9 | "Mask of the Panther" | Micah Gunnell | Geoffrey Thorne | November 11, 2018 | 509 | N/A |
After thwarting Taskmaster's heist of a hyper-cannon, Black Panther heads to Antarctica with Captain America, meeting with Hawkeye and Whitney Frost at S.H.I.E.L.D.'s Zebra Base. They find a Wakandan submarine called Yemandi's Cutter in ice as Black Panther suspects that the final key fragment is on board.
| 114 | 10 | "The Good Son" | Tim Eldred | Eugene Son | November 18, 2018 | 510 | N/A |
While surprised that Baron Zemo is in Black Panther's company, Captain America meets with Black Panther and Shuri to learn about the Panther Key that the Shadow Council used to weaponize a powerful Wakandan artifact. When the key is stolen during a blackout, M'Baku escapes from his cell as White Wolf has his own plans to keep the Panther Key safe which conflicts with Captain America and Black Panther's plans for it.
| 115 | 11 | "The Lost Temple" | Kalvin Lee | Brandon Easton | November 25, 2018 | 511 | N/A |
At a hidden observatory, Black Panther, Captain America, Shuri, and Baron Zemo find the location of the Shrouded Temple when they are transported to the other side of the Moon. After seeing a recorded transmission from T'Chanda on the Shrouded Temple's interface, the four find the door containing the Crown artifact as the Shrouded Temple comes under attack by Killmonger, Klaw, Madame Masque, and Tiger Shark, who knock it out of orbit.
| 116 | 12 | "Descent of the Shadow" | Tim Eldred | Margaret Dunlap | December 2, 2018 | 512 | N/A |
Following the defeat of Madame Masque and Klaw, Black Panther, Captain America, Shuri, and Baron Zemo look for the Crown that the Shadow Council is after as Princess Zanda and Tiger Shark catch up to them and assist Killmonger. The rest of the Avengers show up to help fight the Shadow Council operatives until Baron Zemo puts the crown on himself and starts to become unstable due to not being Wakandan.
| 117 | 13 | "The Last Avenger" | Kalvin Lee | Zach Craley | December 2, 2018 | 513 | N/A |
After Captain America supposedly sacrifices himself to prevent the Crown from emitting a destructive pulse, Black Panther and Shuri work to get the Crown back to Wakanda before it explodes. The Avengers pursue them after Black Widow claimed that Black Panther "killed" Captain America. As Black Panther is unable to reason with the Avengers with all his secrets coming to light, Black Panther and Shuri are on their own safeguarding the Crown until they can return to Wakanda.
| 118 | 14 | "The Vibranium Curtain" | Tim Eldred | Mark Henry | January 6, 2019 | 514 | N/A |
| 119 | 15 | "The Vibranium Curtain" | Kalvin Lee | Trevor Devall | January 6, 2019 | 515 | N/A |
Part 1: Tony Stark holds a memorial for Captain America following his claimed death and states that Black Panther was responsible while denying any knowledge of the Wakanda weapons. In addition, Tony also mentions that the nations of the world have pledged unity against Wakanda including Atlantis. After training, Black Panther sneaks into the United States to track down Klaw and Killmonger while evading the Avengers and Winter Soldier. Part 2: After Black Panther is incarcerated at the Vault, he begins to get his answers from Klaw. He states that Killmonger is after the Heart of Wakanda and agrees to give him information if they escape from the Vault. However, Klaw double-crosses Black Panther as Adrian Toomes shows up to help him. When Toomes gets his Vulture suit back and decides to tie up some loose ends, Black Panther must work with Spider-Man to defeat Vulture.
| 120 | 16 | "T'Chanda" | Tim Eldred | Eugene Son | January 13, 2019 | 516 | N/A |
Now that they have Klaw in their possession, Black Panther and Shuri bring him to the Hall of Royals, the burial ground of previous Wakandan leaders. Black Panther uses the Crown to learn about his grandfather T'Chanda's past, where he, Captain America, and Peggy Carter battled Hydra operatives and the Shadow Council. Note: Stan Lee makes a posthumous cameo appearance as an army general.
| 121 | 17 | "Yemandi" | Kalvin Lee | Denise Downer | January 20, 2019 | 517 | N/A |
After reviewing T'Chanda's memories, Black Panther uses the Crown to learn about the past of Queen Yemandi. She previously battled Thor to gain the Spear of Bashenga before they were forced to work together to stop Morgan le Fay. In the process, Morgan forges the Crown from Bashenga's Core.
| 122 | 18 | "Bashenga" | Tim Eldred | Geoffrey Thorne | January 27, 2019 | 518 | N/A |
After reviewing Yemandi's memories, Black Panther uses the Crown to learn about the past of Wakanda's founder Bashenga. He and his twin sister Bask discovered Vibranium while fleeing from Atlantean warriors and used it to develop Wakanda into a technologically advanced society. However, Bask realizes that Black Panther is watching the events unfold and uses her powers to trap his mind inside the Crown.
| 123 | 19 | "King Breaker" | Kalvin Lee | Zach Craley | February 10, 2019 | 519 | N/A |
| 124 | 20 | "King Breaker" | Tim Eldred | Brandon Easton | February 10, 2019 | 520 | N/A |
Part 1: To get on the good side of Attuma, his daughter Elanna, and Orka, Iron Man has Black Widow and Hawkeye apprehend Killmonger and Tiger Shark. After Captain America escapes the Crown's pocket dimension, he figures out that Black Widow was actually Princess Zanda in disguise. With Captain America still recuperating and Shuri keeping an eye on Bask, Black Panther frees White Wolf to get into Atlantis and stop the Shadow Council from starting a war. Part 2: With Zanda's plot exposed and Lady Elanna rushing Hawkeye to the infirmary, White Wolf makes his way to the Atlantean throne room to disable the bomb that Zanda wired in Tony Stark's armor. Once the bomb is disposed of, Black Panther, White Wolf, Elanna, Attuma, and Tony Stark work together to save Atlantis before it is destroyed while fighting an escaped Killmonger. The Avengers take Killmonger prisoner to find out where the real Black Widow is being held captive, while Elanna releases Tiger Shark to prepare for her revenge on Killmonger and a planned war with the surface world.
| 125 | 21 | "Widowmaker" | Kalvin Lee | Akela Cooper | February 17, 2019 | 521 | N/A |
With the information given to them by Killmonger, Black Panther, Iron Man, and Captain America look for the Shadow Council's base to find Black Widow. They trace her location to an island that negates all technology, where the Council created plant monsters as part of their super soldier program. Afterwards, Black Panther discovers that Bask has awoken and has sided with Killmonger and Madame Masque while also freeing M'Baku and Klaw.
| 126 | 22 | "Atlantis Attacks" | Tim Eldred | Trevor Devall | February 24, 2019 | 522 | N/A |
Bask has defeated Black Panther and takes control of Wakanda. Before Bask can have Black Panther executed, White Wolf rescues Black Panther and they take Klaw hostage. In retaliation for Bask firing Madame Masque's laser on Atlantis, Elanna and Tiger Shark lead the Atlanteans against her. Bask sacrifices herself to stop the laser and Tiger Shark kills White Wolf. This leads Black Panther to attack Tiger Shark before eventually standing down. Shuri is then crowned queen of Wakanda as the two nations make peace.
| 127 | 23 | "House of M" | Kalvin Lee | Henry Gilroy | February 24, 2019 | 523 | N/A |
The Avengers raid a Hydra base and find that Arnim Zola has been dismantled. They run into Black Panther, who was pursuing Madame Masque, and are soon attacked by Red Skull, Crossbones, Crimson Widow and Typhoid Mary. After Madame Masque takes Iron Man and Red Skull captive, Black Panther and Hawkeye must put aside their differences and past grudges to stop her. Note: This episode is dedicated in memory of Stan Lee.

=== Shorts (2017) ===
The shorts take place between Seasons 3 and 4.

| No. overall | No. in season | Title | Directed by | Written by | Original release date |
|---|---|---|---|---|---|
| 1 | 1 | "Teaser" | Micah Gunnell | Eugene Son | June 2, 2017 |
After a presentation at school, Kamala protects a group of civilians from a mutant frog. She then goes to Avengers Compound, where she starts doubting her abilities.
| 2 | 2 | "Black Panther" | Micah Gunnell | Eugene Son | June 3, 2017 |
Captain America and Ms. Marvel talk about Black Panther.
| 3 | 3 | "Captain Marvel" | Micah Gunnell | Eugene Son | June 4, 2017 |
Captain America and Ms. Marvel talk about Captain Marvel.
| 4 | 4 | "Ant-Man and Wasp" | Micah Gunnell | Eugene Son | June 5, 2017 |
Captain America and Ms. Marvel talk about Ant-Man and Wasp.
| 5 | 5 | "Vision" | Micah Gunnell | Eugene Son | June 6, 2017 |
Captain America and Ms. Marvel talk about Vision.
| 6 | 6 | "Ms. Marvel" | Micah Gunnell | Eugene Son | June 7, 2017 |
Captain America reassures Ms. Marvel of her place in the Avengers.
