= Phineas and Ferb: Mission Marvel =

- Phineas and Ferb episodes
- Logo of the special
- Episode nos.: Season 4 Episodes 11/12
- Directed by: Robert F. Hughes; Sue Perrotto
- Written by: Dani Vetere; Jim Bernstein; Martin Olson; Scott Peterson
- Production code: 411–412
- Original air date: August 16, 2013

Guest appearances
- Chi McBride as Nick Fury; Travis Willingham as Thor; Adrian Pasdar as Iron Man; Drake Bell as Spider-Man; Fred Tatasciore as Hulk; Liam O'Brien as Red Skull; Charlie Adler as MODOK; Danny Trejo as Venom; Peter Stormare as Whiplash; Stan Lee as a hot dog vendor

Episode chronology
| ← Previous "One Good Turn" | Next → "Thanks But No Thanks" |
- Phineas and Ferb (season 4)

"Phineas and Ferb: Mission Marvel" is a crossover episode of the animated series Phineas and Ferb, featuring characters from Marvel Entertainment. The 11th and 12th episodes, as well as the 22nd broadcast episode of the fourth season, the 196th episode segment broadcast and the 111th and 112th episodes overall of the series, it aired on August 16, 2013, on Disney Channel and on August 25, 2013, on Disney XD. The episode was released on DVD on October 1, 2013.

== Plot ==
External videos
- Phineas and Ferb Mission Marvel S4 E11 Full Episode Phineas and Ferb @disneychannel — Official upload of the episode onto YouTube

Phineas, Ferb, Isabella, Baljeet and Buford are surfing on an asteroid belt in outer space ("Surfin' Asteroids") while Agent P confronts Dr. Doofenshmirtz. Before Agent P destroys it, Doofenshmirtz's "Power-Draininator" inadvertently fires a beam that bounces off the kids' space station and hits Iron Man, Spider-Man, Hulk, and Thor, who are battling Red Skull, Whiplash, Venom, and MODOK in New York City ("My Streets"), rendering them powerless and allowing the villains to escape.

On the S.H.I.E.L.D. helicarrier, Nick Fury notifies them that the beam came from Phineas and Ferb's station, and they go to the boys' house to confront them, but the two profess their innocence. Meanwhile, after finding out that Doofenshmirtz's Power-Draininator has drained the heroes' powers, the villains pay him a visit, initially thinking him to be an evil genius. After running errands with Doofenshmirtz ("My Evil Buddies and Me"), the villains realize his incompetence and decide to bring the heroes to them by attacking the Googolplex Mall.

Meanwhile, Phineas, Ferb, and their friends plan to assist the heroes in a self-built defense facility, the "Secret Hideout for Emergency Defense" (S.H.E.D.). They build a machine to duplicate the lost powers, but due to Candace's interference, the heroes' powers get mixed up. The heroes and Phineas and Ferb, equipped with their Beak suit, go to the mall to face the villains, but are quickly subdued, and subsequently rescued by Agent P wearing a superhero costume.

Back at the S.H.E.D., due to Candace interfering again, Baljeet is struck by a gamma ray from the power-replicating machine and turns into a Hulkified version of himself before storming off. Phineas lashes out at Candace and revokes her S.H.E.D. card while Buford goes out to look for Hulkjeet. Candace and Isabella lament that they can't seem to do much to help ("Only Trying to Help"), while Doofenshmirtz creates a second, improved Power-Draininator. With the device functional, the villains betray Doofenshmirtz, planning to destroy the Tri-State Area with the Power-Draininator before using it to drain the powers of every other superhero and take over the world.

The villains imprison Doofenshmirtz and Agent P, and begin modifying the device to drain energy and matter as well. Despite their lack of powers, the heroes go to confront the villains. Eventually, Agent P frees both himself and Doofenshmirtz, and they aided the heroes in fighting off the villains. Candace and Isabella go to outer space and discover the heroes' powers held in a data collection tank in the space station. They land the station in Danville and restore the heroes's powers ("Feelin' Super"). The kids watch as the heroes defeat the villains ("Feeling Froggy") and Phineas reconciles with Candace.

With the villains stopped, Nick Fury thanks the children for their help and takes them away. Candace attempts to bust the boys for their crashed space station to Linda, but Doofenshmirtz's Disintegrator-inator disintegrates the station, leaving no evidence. Doofenshmirtz feels good about helping save the world, but laments that no one saw him do so. Meanwhile, Buford approaches Agent P and takes off his mask, revealing him to be Ducky Momo. He flees and Perry shows up a few moments later revealing Agent P's superhero suit and a Ducky Momo mask in a trash can nearby.

== Background ==
In 2009, The Walt Disney Company acquired Marvel Entertainment. This was the first animated crossover between Disney and Marvel. "Our partnership with Marvel has yielded big returns this year – first with the launch of the Marvel Universe block on Disney XD, and now with production beginning on the Phineas and Ferb / Marvel special. To paraphrase Phineas himself: best year EVER!", said Gary Marsh, president and chief creative officer, Disney Channels Worldwide.

== Production ==
The episode was officially announced at Comic-Con. Marvel executive Dan Buckley stated that "Phineas and Ferb: Mission Marvel is an exciting animated special for everyone at Disney and Marvel. Bringing together the worlds of Phineas and Ferb and Marvel's The Avengers is a ton of fun for fans of both properties". Additionally, he said that "It's a thrilling opportunity for these two franchises to take advantage of each other in a way that may go beyond this one special. Fans of all ages are in for a very special treat!"

Phineas and Ferb co-creators Jeff "Swampy" Marsh and Dan Povenmire worked closely with Marvel writers to adapt the characters. They planned for Iron Man to use Thor's hammer Mjolnir, but were prevented from doing so and forced to re-board the scene.

On June 6, 2013, USA Today released the first full-length trailer for the special. On July 7, 2013, during an episode of Avengers Assemble, Disney XD aired a 90-second sneak peek of the special. On August 12, 2013, users of the "Watch Disney Channel" application got to watch the special before it aired on television.

Drake Bell, Adrian Pasdar, Travis Willingham, Fred Tatasciore, Liam O'Brien, Charlie Adler, and Chi McBride reprise their roles from Ultimate Spider-Man and Avengers Assemble as Spider-Man, Iron Man, Thor, Hulk, Red Skull, MODOK, and Nick Fury respectively. Additionally, Peter Stormare voices Whiplash, Danny Trejo voices Venom, and Stan Lee makes a cameo appearance as a hot dog vendor modeled after his likeness.

== Reception ==
=== Ratings ===
Phineas and Ferb: Mission Marvel had 3.8 million viewers, the series highest ratings in six months. It ranked as the night's number one TV telecast across major youth demos and was the number one cable TV telecast in total viewers. In the United Kingdom it garnered 234,000 viewers when it premiered on September 12, 2013.

=== Critical reception ===
Gwen Ihnat of The A.V. Club gave the episode a B+, saying "Instead of worrying about Disney 'kidifying' Marvel, just enjoy the Phineas and Ferb magic in this animated mashup".

Daniel Alvarez of Unleash the Fanboy gave it 4.5 stars out of 5 saying "Overall, Phineas and Ferb: Mission Marvel is one of the most fun things to come out of Marvel animation recently. The dialogue is great and you will find yourself laughing out loud at some parts. It's fun for all, young ones and longtime comic fans alike".

Denette Wilford of Huffington Post Canada enjoyed it, but noted that it was not as good as Phineas and Ferb the Movie: Across the 2nd Dimension.

== Broadcast ==
The special premiered in the United States on Disney Channel on August 16, 2013 and on Disney XD on August 25, 2013. In Canada it premiered on August 16, 2013 on Family and on August 18, 2013 on Disney XD. It aired on August 17, 2013 on Disney Channel in India and on September 12, 2013 on Disney XD in the UK and Ireland. It was broadcast on April 10, 2014 on Disney XD in Australia. In the original US airing, non-diegetic songs had no vocals, but were all restored when it was rerun.
