= Human Cannonball (disambiguation) =

Human cannonball is a performance act in which a person (the "cannonball") is ejected from a specially designed "cannon".

Human Cannonball may also refer to:

- Human Cannonball (album), a 1993 album by the alternative rock group, School of Fish
- Human Cannonball (DC Comics), a comic book character owned by DC Comics
- Human Cannonball (Marvel Comics), a comic book character owned by Marvel Comics
- Human Cannonball (video game), by Atari
- "Human Cannonball", a song by Butthole Surfers from the album Locust Abortion Technician
- "Human Cannonball", a song by Webb Wilder from the album Hybrid Vigor
- Frank "Cannonball" Richards, a performer notable for being shot with a cannonball
