= Nebulon =

Nebulon may refer to:

- Nebulon (comics), a fictional character in the Marvel Universe
- Nebulon, a fictional character from Homestar Runner

== See also ==
- Nebulon-B frigate, a fictional starship in Star Wars
