= Speed Demon (Marvel Comics) =

- Speed Demon (foreground) and the Superior Spider-Man (background) as depicted in Superior Foes of Spider-Man #3 (September 2013). Art by Mark Bagley.

Publication information
- Publisher: Marvel Comics
- First appearance: As Whizzer: The Avengers #69 (Oct. 1969); As Speed Demon: The Amazing Spider-Man #222 (Nov. 1981)
- Created by: Roy Thomas; Sal Buscema

In-story information
- Alter ego: James Sanders
- Species: Human mutate
- Team affiliations: Squadron Sinister; Sinister Syndicate; Thunderbolts; Sinister Six
- Notable aliases: Whizzer, Harvey James
- Abilities: Genius-level chemist Superhuman speed, stamina and reflexes

Speed Demon (James Sanders) is a supervillain appearing in American comic books published by Marvel Comics. Created by Roy Thomas and Sal Buscema, the character made his first appearance in The Avengers #69 (October 1969) as a member of the Squadron Sinister known as the Whizzer.

== Publication history ==
James Sanders first appears as the Whizzer in the final panel of The Avengers #69 (October 1969), the first chapter of a three-issue storyline by writer Roy Thomas and penciller Sal Buscema. The story arc introduced the supervillain team the Squadron Sinister, whose four members were loosely based on heroes in the DC Comics team Justice League of America, with the Whizzer based on the Flash.

== Fictional character biography ==
The Grandmaster created the Squadron Sinister to battle the champions of the time-traveling Kang – the superhero team the Avengers. The Whizzer battles Avenger Goliath, but the fight is interrupted by Black Knight. The Avengers eventually defeat the Squadron and they in turn are abandoned by the Grandmaster. The Squadron reappear in the title Defenders, reunited by the alien Nebulon. The villains receive greater power in exchange for the planet Earth, and create a laser cannon to melt the polar ice caps, covering the Earth in water. The superhero team the Defenders prevent the scheme and defeat the villains (and Nebulon), with Namor humiliating the Whizzer.

After this defeat the Whizzer and his teammates are teleported off-world by Nebulon, returning with an energy-draining weapon. The Squadron Sinister plan to threaten the Earth again but are defeated once more by the Defenders and the Avenger Yellowjacket. The character has another brief encounter with several members of the Avengers, who seek a way to separate Doctor Spectrum's prism from the Wasp. The Whizzer disassociates himself from the Squadron Sinister and adopts a new costume and alias, Speed Demon.

Writer Bill Mantlo and penciller Bob Hall revamped the character in the title The Amazing Spider-Man, with Sanders returning to crime with a new costume and the alias Speed Demon. The character makes a number of appearances in titles, including Marvel Team-Up against Spider-Man and the Human Torch, in The Amazing Spider-Man as a member of the criminal group the Sinister Syndicate, Marvel Tales, Quasar, and in the graphic novel Avengers: Deathtrap – The Vault (1991).

Speed Demon makes another abortive attempt to kill Spider-Man in the limited series The Deadly Foes of Spider-Man; battles Wolverine; features in Web of Spider-Man; encounters Spider-Man and the New Warriors in Spectacular Spider-Man Annual #12, Web of Spider-Man Annual #8, and The New Warriors Annual #2 (all 1992); and in the title Captain America briefly skirmishes with the hero at an A.I.M. weapons expo. After an appearance in the limited series Spider-Man: The Power of Terror, Speed Demon is employed by Justin Hammer to battle the superhero team the Thunderbolts.

Speed Demon is recruited to join the New Thunderbolts but is eventually ejected from the team by heroine Songbird for stealing money to fund the team (including from the company of former teammate Kyle Richmond, who tracks the character as Nighthawk). After a confrontation and unexpected skirmish with Hyperion and a new Doctor Spectrum (Alice Nugent, former lab assistant of Hank Pym), Speed Demon defects to join the reformed Squadron Sinister.

Courtesy of a phenomenon known as the Wellspring of Power, an interdimensional source of superhuman abilities, the Grandmaster – guiding force behind the return of the Squadron Sinister – has been increasing the Squadron Sinister's powers. He directs Speed Demon and the Squadron (now joined by Nighthawk, who wishes to stop New Thunderbolts leader Baron Zemo) to find the main source of the Wellspring. For a time the character, deprived of the use of the Wellspring, is powerless and has his legs broken in a battle with New Thunderbolts member Joystick. Empowered in the final battle against the New Thunderbolts, Speed Demon takes advantage of the chaos caused when Zemo defeats the Grandmaster to viciously beat Joystick in retaliation for his injuries. Speed Demon and the members of the Squadron scatter and escape.

Speed Demon appeared in Brand New Day as one of the villains in the Bar With No Name. He later joined The Hood's gang, and attacks Mister Negative.

In Marvel Now!, Speed Demon appears as a member of the latest incarnation of the Sinister Six. Speed Demon features as one of the main characters in Superior Foes of Spider-Man.

Speed Demon later appears robbing a pawn shop with Man Mountain Marko when they are caught by Rage. After a brief fight, they escape while Rage gets arrested by the Americops. He is later captured by Sam Wilson, as the former Captain America, who forced him to confess of his and Marko's involvement in the pawn shop robbery.

Speed Demon was among the villains who were killed by Black Ant and a restored Hank Pym and revived to join the Lethal Legion.

== Powers and abilities ==
Speed Demon battles Spider-Man on the cover of The Amazing Spider-Man #222 (Nov. 1981). Art by Walt Simonson.

As a result of mutagenic chemicals concocted under the Grandmaster's mental guidance, Speed Demon possesses superhuman speed, stamina, and reflexes. The character can create cyclones by running in circles, as well as run up walls and across water. Speed Demon's superhumanly fast thought processes and reflexes enable him to perceive his surroundings while moving at high speeds, pick up objects, and execute complex acrobatic maneuvers.

James Sanders possesses a master's degree in chemistry.

== Reception ==
- In 2018, Comic Book Resources (CBR) ranked Speed Demon 12th in their "25 Fastest Characters In The Marvel Universe" list.
- In 2020, CBR ranked Speed Demon 5th in their "10 Most Powerful Members of the Sinister Syndicate" list.
- In 2022, CBR ranked Speed Demon 10th in their "Marvel: The 20 Fastest Speedsters" list.

== Other versions ==
=== House of M ===
An alternate universe variant of James Sanders from Earth-58163 appears in New Thunderbolts #11. This version is a biochemist.

=== Marvel Zombies ===
A zombified alternate universe variant of Speed Demon from Earth-2149 appears in Marvel Zombies.

== In other media ==
- Speed Demon appears in Avengers Assemble, voiced by Jason Spisak. This version is an alien and member of the Squadron Supreme who joined them in destroying their home planet and derives his powers from a speed belt.
- The James Sanders incarnation of Speed Demon appears in the Your Friendly Neighborhood Spider-Man episode "Secret Identity Crisis", voiced by Roger Craig Smith. This version is Maria Vasquez's boyfriend who received a pair of boots that grant super-speed from Otto Octavius.
