= Squadron Sinister =

Marvel Comics fictional group

- The Squadron Sinister (left) battle the Avengers on the cover to The Avengers #70 (Nov. 1969). Art by Sal Buscema.

Publication information
- Publisher: Marvel Comics
- First appearance: Final panel of Avengers #69 (Oct. 1969)
- Created by: Roy Thomas; Sal Buscema

In-story information
- Base(s): Pocket Dimension
- Member(s): Doctor Spectrum; Hyperion; Nighthawk; Whizzer

The Squadron Sinister is a supervillain team appearing in American comic books published by Marvel Comics. The Squadron Sinister first appeared in the final panel of The Avengers #69 (October 1969), created by Roy Thomas and Sal Buscema. The team is a pastiche of DC's Justice League.

== Publication history ==
The first version of the Squadron Sinister is formed by the Elder of the Universe known as the Grandmaster, and used as pawns to battle the champions of the time-traveling Kang the Conqueror, superhero team the Avengers. The Grandmaster creates four villains—Doctor Spectrum, Hyperion, Nighthawk, and the Whizzer—to face heroes Iron Man, Thor, Captain America and Goliath (Clint Barton). In interviews, Thomas and Jerry Bails have stated that the Squadron was based on the DC Comics superhero team the Justice League of America, evoking the DC characters Green Lantern, Superman, Batman and Flash respectively.

== Fictional character biography ==
=== Grandmaster's Squadron Sinister ===
The limited series Squadron Supreme, written by Mark Gruenwald, explains that the Grandmaster based the Squadron Sinister on the already existing Squadron Supreme of the Earth-712 universe. The similarities also caused confusion in Marvel's production department, as the covers of The Avengers #85 (February 1971) and #141 (November 1975) "cover-blurbed" appearances by the Squadron Sinister, when in fact it was the Squadron Supreme that appeared in both issues.

The Avengers eventually defeat the Squadron, and the Grandmaster abandoned them as a result. The Squadron reappear in the title The Defenders, reunited by the alien Nebulon. The villains receive greater power in exchange for a promise to deliver Earth. The villains create a giant laser cannon in the Arctic, intending to melt the polar ice caps and cover the entirety of Earth's surface in water. The team the Defenders are alerted to the scheme by Nighthawk and defeat the villains and Nebulon, with Nighthawk reforming and joining the Defenders the following issue.

After this defeat the three remaining members of the Squadron Sinister are teleported off-world by Nebulon, eventually returning with an energy-draining weapon. The villains plan to threaten Earth again, but are defeated once more by the Defenders and the Avenger Yellowjacket. During another brief encounter with several members of the Avengers – who seek a way to separate Doctor Spectrum's Power Prism from fellow Avenger the Wasp – the villains are revealed to have disbanded.

Two members of the Squadron make isolated appearances. Hyperion appears in the title Thor, battling the hero once again, and features in Marvel Two-in-One in an encounter with the Thing. Hyperion also travels to the Earth-712 universe and, after impersonating the Squadron Supreme's Hyperion for a time, dies in a heated battle with his counterpart. The title The Amazing Spider-Man showcases the Whizzer's return, where he returns to crime with a new costume and the alias the Speed Demon.

=== Resurrected Squadron Sinister ===
The Grandmaster reappears and reforms the Squadron Sinister: an apparently resurrected Hyperion; a new Dr. Spectrum (Alice Nugent, a former lab assistant of Hank Pym), Nighthawk and the Speed Demon. Courtesy of a phenomenon known as the Wellspring of Power – an interdimensional source of superhuman abilities – the Grandmaster increases the team's power, and they battle the New Thunderbolts. Thunderbolts team leader Baron Zemo defeats the Grandmaster and, in the ensuing chaos, the Squadron Sinister escape.

== Other versions ==
=== Secret Wars (2015) ===
An alternate version appears in the Secret Wars storyline, battling for control of zones of Battleworld. The team is systematically destroyed from within by a rogue member.

== See also ==
- Imperial Guard — Marvel superhero team originally created as a pastiche of DC's Legion of Super-Heroes
