= Just like a Woman (1992 film) =

Just Like a Woman
- Theatrical release poster
- Directed by: Christopher Monger
- Written by: Nicholas Evans
- Based on: Geraldine, For the Love of a Transvestite by Monica Jay
- Produced by: Nicholas Evans
- Starring: Julie Walters; Adrian Pasdar; Paul Freeman
- Cinematography: Alan Hume
- Edited by: Nicolas Gaster
- Music by: Michael Storey
- Production companies: Rank Organisation; Zenith Entertainment
- Distributed by: Rank
- Release date: 25 September 1992
- Running time: 106 minutes
- Country: United Kingdom
- Language: English
- Budget: £2.3 million
- Box office: £0.3 million (UK)

Just Like a Woman is a 1992 British comedy-drama film directed by Christopher Monger, and starring Julie Walters, Adrian Pasdar and Paul Freeman. The screenplay by Nicholas Evans is based on the 1985 novel Geraldine, For the Love of a Transvestite by Monica Jay. One of few "cross-dressing" films in which the hero is actually a transvestite, therefore having pure intentions, unlike Some Like It Hot, Tootsie, Mrs. Doubtfire and others in which the cross-dresser has an ulterior motive, the film was a modest commercial and critical success.

== Plot ==
Gerald Tilson, a finance executive, finds himself thrown out by his wife when she discovers women's underwear in their flat; in fact the clothes belong to him. He takes lodgings with Monica, who gradually discovers his alter ego, "Geraldine". A subplot deals with his boss's plan to defraud their Japanese clients, and how the couple thwart it.

== Cast ==
- Julie Walters as Monica
- Adrian Pasdar as Gerald Tilson/Geraldine
- Paul Freeman as Miles Millichamp
- Susan Wooldridge as Louisa
- Gordon Kennedy as C.J.
- Ian Redford as Tom Braxton
- Shelley Thompson as Eleanor Tilson
- Togo Igawa as Akira Watanabe
- Jill Spurrier as Daphne
- Corey Cowper as Erika Tilson
- Mark Hadfield as Dennis
- Joseph Bennett as Jocelyn

== Production ==
The film's title is taken from the song "Just Like a Woman" by Bob Dylan.

== See also ==
- Transgender in film and television
- Cross-dressing in film and television
