= Missing Link (comics) =

Missing Link is the name of four fictional characters appearing in American comic books published by Marvel Comics.

== Publication history ==
The second Missing Link first appeared in The Incredible Hulk vol. 2 #105-106 (July–Aug. 1968), and was created by Bill Everett, Roy Thomas, and Marie Severin. This story was later reprinted in Marvel Treasury Edition #5 (1974). The character subsequently appears in The Incredible Hulk vol. 2 #179 (Sept. 1974), and Rom #29 (April 1982). The Missing Link received an entry in the Marvel Legacy: The 1970s Handbook #1 (2006).

== Fictional character biography ==
=== Time-traveling Missing Link ===
The Missing Link was originally from an Earth which was ravaged by an atomic war. He travels back in time to get an insight into Earth's past and arrives on an uncharted island in the Pacific Ocean. Three unnamed scientists exploring the island at the time discover him, thinking he is a prehistoric human ancestor. They bring him back to civilization, spending months to figure out how to communicate with the being not knowing that the Missing Link chooses not to talk to avoid meddling with the past. The Missing Link eventually breaks down and begs for the scientists to return him to the island. Once back there, he reveals that he came from the future where a great atomic war had changed all of humanity. Before disappearing into his time machine, he begs the scientists to learn how to end all warfare.

=== Circus of Crime's Missing Link ===
Missing Link is a member of Fritz Tiboldt's incarnation of the Circus of Crime who has a primate-like face. During the group's fight with Captain America and Bucky, Missing Link is knocked out by Bucky.

=== Radioactive Missing Link ===
Missing Link
- The Missing Link battles the Hulk; from The Incredible Hulk vol. 2 #179 (Sept. 1974).

Publication information
- Publisher: Marvel Comics
- First appearance: The Incredible Hulk vol. 2 #105 (July 1968)
- Created by: Bill Everett, Roy Thomas, and Marie Severin

In-story information
- Species: Mutated Neanderthal-like humanoid
- Notable aliases: Lincoln the Beast-Man
- Abilities: Superhuman strength Glass-like material body Radiation generation

The Missing Link is a super-humanly strong Neanderthal-like humanoid whose body absorbs and emits radiation. Eventually, the Missing Link builds up so much radiation that he explodes, but he can then reconstruct his body. He was born thousands of years ago and had become sealed up in an underground area as a volcanic eruption occurred, leaving him in suspended animation until modern times.

A Chinese atomic test opens a rift in the ground, spewing magma to the surface, and a few days later the creature crawls out, mutating into a new radioactive form. Chinese forces place him in a lead-lined capsule aboard a freighter from a satellite nation, to be launched into New York harbor. During his ensuing rampage through New York, the Missing Link fights the Hulk.

The Missing Link reforms his body in the Appalachian Mountains, where he is found and cared for by the Brickford family. The Brickfords take in Bruce Banner (Hulk's alter ego) soon after. Banner recognizes Lincoln as the Missing Link after Jimmy-Jack Brickford is poisoned by Lincoln's radiation. Banner confronts Lincoln to get him to leave the Brickfords, but Lincoln does not believe him and attacks. As the Missing Link fights the Hulk, his touch burns the Hulk, and he realizes that Banner was telling the truth just as he reaches critical mass and explodes again. When the miners see the Hulk and the Missing Link crawling out from the wreckage, both the Brickfords and the other citizens think that the Hulk was responsible for the destruction and Jimmy-Jack's sickness. The Hulk leaves the area unnoticed when Lincoln is no longer a threat.

When Lincoln reforms into a solid form again, he continues to stay with the Brickfords and continues to work for them in the mines. The mines begin to leak toxic fumes, making people leave or become sick. Lincoln realizes this is his fault, and he hides deep in the mines. After detective the radiation, the Spaceknight Rom investigates and cures the radiation poisoning suffered by the Brickfords. Rom finds Lincoln and explains to him that he threatens the whole planet. Rom then uses his neutralizer to remove the radiation from Lincoln.

However, the town cannot be rebuilt, so the Brickfords surrender Lincoln to the authorities.

=== Ray Morgan ===
Ray Morgan is a member of the Chain Gang, who fought Sleepwalker. He is insecure and struggles to make decisions.

== Powers and abilities ==
The radioactive Missing Link is superhumanly strong, with sufficient might to rival the Hulk. His body is crystalline and can shatter if hit with enough force, but it will quickly fuse back together. His body generates radiation, which can melt concrete and even burn the Hulk's skin. This radiation eventually builds to a critical level, causing the Missing Link to explode. When he reforms afterwards, his radiation level is temporarily reduced.

The Ray Morgan version of the Missing Link can teleport himself and others.
