= Lee Henshaw =

British fiction writer

Lee Henshaw (born 1972, Macclesfield) is a British fiction writer.

His first novel, Queer Fish in God's Waiting Room, was published by Legend Press in 2008 and was called 'distinctive and engaging' by The Guardian. It also received praise from comedian and author Dom Joly. He called it ‘simply brilliant’ and described Lee as ‘a stoned new Kerouac’.

Fruit Tree Books released the Queer Fish in God’s Waiting Room audiobook in early 2011. The American actor Adrian Pasdar (Heroes, Castle and Iron Man) recorded the audiobook in Manhattan in the summer of 2010.

== Biography ==
In 1989, during his ‘year out’ between A Levels and University, Henshaw wrote for his local newspaper, The Macclesfield Express, as a music columnist. He also published a local music fanzine called Feedback.

While at university in Manchester in 1990 he recorded features for Mark Radcliffe’s BBC Radio 5 show Hit The North and wrote features for the listings magazine City Life.

For his creative writing module at university he wrote his first fiction, a short story called Hedley Had An Erection.

In 1993 he became the music columnist and a feature writer for The Manchester Evening News.

His first book, a biography of the rock band Oasis, was published in 1996.

Working as a journalist, Henshaw’s writing has appeared in many high-profile publications in the UK, including The Guardian, The Observer and The Times.

Henshaw currently lives in London with his wife and two children and is working on his next novel, The Uncertainty of Friendship, a tragedy set in Macclesfield in 1989.
