= Adrian Pasdar =

American actor (born 1965)

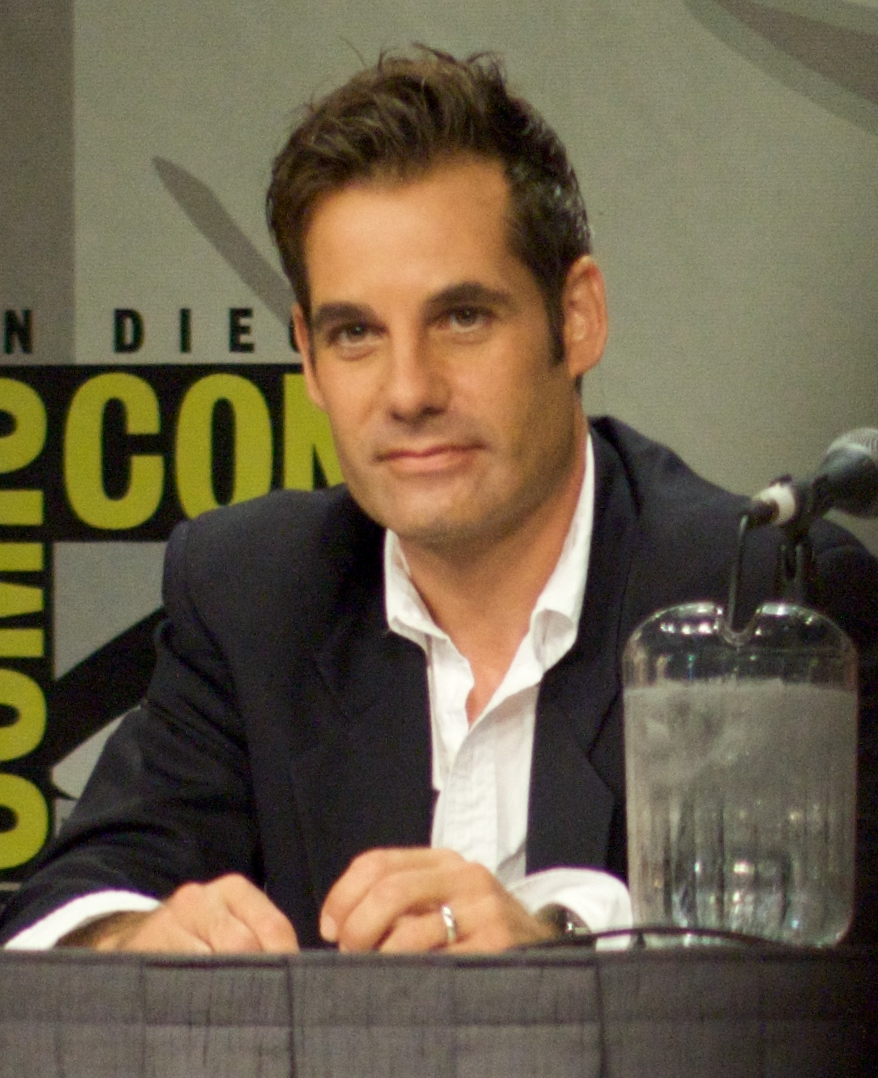
- Pasdar at the 2008 Comic-Con International
- Born: Adrian Kayvan Pasdar; April 30, 1965 (age 61); Pittsfield, Massachusetts, U.S.
- Occupation: Actor
- Years active: 1986–present
- Spouse: Natalie Maines (m. 2000; div. 2019)
- Children: 2

Adrian Kayvan Pasdar (Persian: آدریان کیوان پاسدار; born April 30, 1965) is an American actor. He is known for his roles in Profit, Near Dark, Carlito's Way, Mysterious Ways, Desperate Housewives, Burn Notice, Heroes and as Glenn Talbot / Graviton on Agents of S.H.I.E.L.D.. Additionally, he directed the feature film Cement. He is also known as the voice of Tony Stark / Iron Man in Marvel Anime, as well as in the animated series Ultimate Spider-Man, Hulk and the Agents of S.M.A.S.H., Phineas and Ferb: Mission Marvel, and Avengers Assemble, and in the Lego Marvel Super Heroes and Disney Infinity videogames. He also played district attorney Alec Rybak on The Lying Game. He has appeared on the American TV drama Grand Hotel as Felix.

== Early life ==
Pasdar was born in Pittsfield, Massachusetts. His father, Homayoon Pasdar (Persian: هومایون پاسدار; born 1935), was an Iranian-American cardiac surgeon, with a practice near Philadelphia. His mother, Rosemarie Sbresn, who immigrated from Germany, worked as a travel agent. Pasdar grew up in West Philadelphia, which he described as primarily Black. His family later moved to Lansdowne, Pennsylvania. He graduated from Marple Newtown High School, where he went by his middle name Kayvan and where he played football and studied acting. Pasdar attended the University of Florida on a football scholarship, turning to acting after an injury.

His sister, Anamarie Pasdar, is a theatrical artistic director and producer.

== Career ==
=== Early career ===
Pasdar turned his attention to campus stage productions and rediscovered an early interest in writing and acting. No longer able to play football, he dropped out of school and returned home, taking a job with a theater group, People's Light and Theatre Company. There, he worked on sound and lighting as part of the stage crew responsible for set construction. He had a painful accident on the set, cutting off the end of his left thumb. His resulting medical compensation paid for attendance at the Lee Strasberg Theater Institute in New York City.

Pasdar was also selected to play a bit part as a police officer in the Dixie Chicks video for their song "Goodbye Earl". The music video won both the Academy of Country Music and the Country Music Association's Video of the Year Awards in 2000.

=== Film ===
At the age of 19, he auditioned for a role in Top Gun. Director Tony Scott was so impressed that he wrote the part of "Chipper" just for him. This led to bigger roles in Solarbabies (1986), Streets of Gold (1986), and Kathryn Bigelow's cult vampire movie Near Dark (1987), with Pasdar in the lead role of Caleb Colton. His other major roles include Vital Signs (1990). Pasdar got his biggest break in movies, when he starred as a beautiful woman opposite Julie Walters in the British movie Just Like a Woman. In 1992, he left Hollywood and returned to New York, working as a cashier for room and board, while taking the occasional small part, such as Frankie in Brian De Palma's Carlito's Way (1993).

Adrian Pasdar wrote and directed the short film Beyond Belief and directed his first feature film, the art-house neo-noir Cement, a contemporary retelling of Othello, in 1999. The $1.7 million independent feature, which won Best Picture awards on the festival circuit, starred Chris Penn, Jeffrey Wright, Sherilyn Fenn, and Henry Czerny, and was written by Farscape screenwriter Justin Monjo. "I've used every ounce of energy and every drop of money I had to make Cement," Pasdar said.

=== Television ===
Pasdar's major break into television came in 1996, when he was cast as the title character on the Fox series Profit. He also guest-starred in the two-hour season finale of the fourth season of Touched by an Angel. From 2000 to 2002, Pasdar played the lead role of anthropology Professor Declan Dunn in the spooky cult drama series Mysterious Ways on PAX.

Pasdar played David McClaren in the final two seasons of the CBS drama Judging Amy from 2003 through 2005. In 2006, he had a high-profile guest role as Gabrielle Solis's sleazy lawyer in Desperate Housewives.

He starred as Nathan Petrelli in the NBC superhero drama Heroes. Pasdar based his mysterious character on "the most morally liquid characters" that he's encountered in his life. The character is not based on one particular political figure, but on a melange of different ones, both good and bad. Pasdar's character was killed off in an episode that aired November 30, 2009.

Pasdar voices Hawkeye in the animated series The Super Hero Squad Show and voiced Captain America in the Black Panther animated series. Having also voiced Iron Man in the English dub of the Iron Man anime series, Pasdar reprised the role in Marvel's Avengers Assemble (seasons 1–3), Ultimate Spider-Man, and Hulk and the Agents of S.M.A.S.H..

Pasdar also played a role on The Lying Game as Alec Rybak, a corrupt district attorney. In 2013, Pasdar guest-starred in the seventh and final season of Burn Notice as Randall Burke for three episodes. From 2014 to 2018, he played the recurring role of Glenn Talbot / Graviton on the Marvel TV series Agents of S.H.I.E.L.D., and from 2016 to 2017, recurred as Nolan Burgess on the series Colony. He also starred in the pilot of the Amazon Studios series The After. He also portrays the DC Comics character Morgan Edge in season 3 of The CW's Supergirl.

== Personal life ==
Pasdar married musician Natalie Maines of The Chicks on June 24, 2000. They have two sons, born in 2001 and 2004. On July 5, 2017, Maines announced that she and Pasdar were divorcing after 17 years of marriage. The divorce was finalized on December 19, 2019.

Pasdar is a guitarist for charity rock band Band from TV. Part of the proceeds from the band's concerts go to his nominated charity, the Rush Epilepsy Center.

== Awards and nominations ==
Acting

- 2009: Academy of Science Fiction, Fantasy & Horror Films: Saturn Award for Best Supporting Actor in Television, Heroes

Directing

- 2000: AngelCiti film festival: Audience Award, Cement

Other

- 2009 (ensemble): Hollywood Note Foundation's Change the World Awards, Humanitarian Award of Inspiration: Band From TV

== Filmography ==
Year	Title	Role	Other notes
1986	Top Gun	Lieutenant Charles 'Chipper' Piper	Film Debut
1986	Solarbabies	Darstar	
1986	Streets of Gold	Timmy Boyle	
1987	Made in U.S.A.	Dar	
1987	Near Dark	Caleb Colton	
1989	Cookie	Vito	
1990	Torn Apart	Ben Arnon	
1990	Vital Signs	Michael Chatham	
1991	Shanghai 1920	Dawson Cole	
1991	Grand Isle	Robert Lebrun	
1992	Just Like a Woman	Gerald Tilson / Geraldine	
1993	Ghost Brigade	Captain John Harling	
1993	Carlito's Way	Frankie Taglialucci	
1994	The Last Good Time	Eddie	
1995	Slave of Dreams	Joseph	
1995	A Mother's Gift	William Deal	
1996	The Pompatus of Love	Josh	
1997	Wounded	Hanaghan	
1997	Love in Another Town	Jake Cantrell	
2003	Secondhand Lions	Traveling Salesman	
2008	Home Movie	David Poe	
2013	Lego Marvel Super Heroes: Maximum Overload	Tony Stark / Iron Man	Short film
2013	Iron Man & Captain America: Heroes United	Tony Stark / Iron Man	Voice
2020	A Fall from Grace	Prosecutor Bradley Tankerton	
2021	The Manson Brothers Midnight Zombie Massacre	Doctor Dudembru	
2024	The Exorcism	Tom	

== Television ==
Year	Title	Role	Notes
1990	The Lost Capone	Ricard Hart / Jimmy Capone	Television film
1994	Shadows of Desire	Jude Snow	
1996	Profit	Jim Profit	
1997	Feds	C. Oliver Resor	Miniseries
1997	Touched By Evil	Jerry Braskin	Television film
1997	House of Frankenstein 1997	Detective Vernon Coyle	Television film
1998	The Outer Limits	Tanner Brooks	Episode: "In the Zone"
1998	Touched by an Angel	Edward Tanner	2 episodes
1998	The Perfect Getaway	Colt Erickson	Television film
1999	Mutiny	Lieutenant Maravich	Television film
2000–2002	Mysterious Ways	Declan Dunn	
2002	The Twilight Zone	Andrew Lomax	Episode: "Dream Lover"
2003–2005	Judging Amy	David McClaren	Seasons 5-6
2005	Desperate Housewives	David Bradley	3 episodes
2006–2009	Heroes	Nathan Petrelli	
2009	The Super Hero Squad Show	Clint Barton / Hawkeye	Voice, 3 episodes
2010	Black Panther	Steve Rogers / Captain America	Voice, pilot
2010–2011	Marvel Anime: Iron Man	Tony Stark / Iron Man	English Dub
2011	Castle	Mark Fallon	2 episodes
2011	Law & Order: Criminal Intent	Mason Kent	Episode: "Trophy Wine"
2011–2012	Young Justice	Hugo Strange, National Guardsman #1	Voice, 2 episodes
2011–2013	The Lying Game	Alec Rybak	29 episodes
2012	Chasing Leprechauns	Michael Garrett	Television film
2012	Political Animals	President Paul Garcetti	Miniseries
2012–2017	Ultimate Spider-Man	Tony Stark / Iron Man	Voice, 9 episodes
2013	Phineas and Ferb: Mission Marvel	Tony Stark / Iron Man	Television special
2013	Burn Notice	Randall Burke	4 episodes
2013–2015	Hulk and the Agents of S.M.A.S.H.	Tony Stark / Iron Man	Seasons 4-5
2013–2017	Avengers Assemble	Tony Stark / Iron Man / Iron Patriot, Bruto, WWII Soldier #3	Seasons 1–3
2014–2018	Agents of S.H.I.E.L.D.	Glenn Talbot / Graviton	24 episodes
2015–2017	Transformers: Robots in Disguise	Micronus Prime	Voice, 3 episodes
2016–2017	Colony	Nolan Burgess	10 episodes
2016–2019	Milo Murphy's Law	Mr. Chase	Voice, 4 episodes
2017–2018	Supergirl	Morgan Edge	4 episodes
2017	Lethal Weapon	Dan Cooper	2 episodes
2019	Grand Hotel	Felix	3 episodes
2022	The Rookie	Bill August	Episode: "Enervo"
2023	Pluto	Brando	English dub

=== Director ===
Year	Title	Other notes
1999	Cement	Also co-producer and composer

== Video games ==
Year	Title	Role
2013	Lego Marvel Super Heroes	Tony Stark/Iron Man
2015	Disney Infinity 3.0	Tony Stark/Iron Man

== Audiobook narration ==
In 2010, Pasdar narrated an audiobook edition of the cult novel Queer Fish in God's Waiting Room by the British writer Lee Henshaw. It was released in early 2011.
