= Avengers Assemble (TV series) =

American Animated television series (2013–2019)

- Promotional image for Avengers Assemble. Clockwise from top left: Falcon, Hulk, Black Widow, Thor, Iron Man, Captain America, Hawkeye.
- Also known as: Marvel's Avengers Assemble; Marvel's Avengers: Ultron Revolution (season 3); Marvel's Avengers: Secret Wars (season 4); Marvel's Avengers: Black Panther's Quest (season 5)
- Genre: Superhero; Action; Adventure
- Based on: Avengers by: Stan Lee; Jack Kirby
- Developed by: Marvel Animation; Man of Action
- Voices of: Laura Bailey; Troy Baker; James C. Mathis III; Adrian Pasdar (season 1–3); Bumper Robinson; Roger Craig Smith; Fred Tatasciore; Travis Willingham; Mick Wingert (seasons 4–5)
- Composers: Michael McCuistion; Lolita Ritmanis; Kristopher Carter
- Country of origin: United States
- Original language: English
- No. of seasons: 5
- No. of episodes: 127 (list of episodes)

Production
- Executive producers: Alan Fine; Dan Buckley; Joe Quesada; Jeph Loeb (seasons 1–4); Cort Lane (seasons 4–5); Eric Radomski (seasons 4–5)
- Editor: Fred Udell
- Running time: 22 minutes
- Production company: Marvel Animation

Original release
- Network: Disney XD
- Release: May 26, 2013 – February 24, 2019

Related
- Hulk and the Agents of S.M.A.S.H.; Ultimate Spider-Man; Guardians of the Galaxy; Marvel's Spider-Man

Avengers Assemble is an American superhero animated series based on the Marvel Comics superhero team known as the Avengers. Designed to capitalize on the success of the 2012 film The Avengers, the series premiered on Disney XD on May 26, 2013, as the successor to The Avengers: Earth's Mightiest Heroes.

It previously aired alongside Ultimate Spider-Man, Hulk and the Agents of S.M.A.S.H., and Guardians of the Galaxy as a part of the Marvel Universe block. Joe Casey, Joe Kelly, Duncan Rouleau and Steven T. Seagle, known collectively as Man of Action, developed the series and were executive producers on seasons 1 and 2.

The series ended on February 24, 2019, after 127 episodes over the course of five seasons, making it the longest running Marvel animated series. However, it is expected to be surpassed by Disney Jr.'s Spidey and His Amazing Friends following preemptive renewals for a sixth and seventh season in June 2025 and August 2026 respectively.

== Plot ==
=== Premise ===
Falcon is the newest member of the Avengers. Falcon is the main eyes and ears of the viewer as he fights evil and saves the world with his teammates. The Avengers team consist of Iron Man, Captain America, Thor, Hulk, Black Widow, and Hawkeye.

=== Season 1 ===
When Red Skull begins dying due to his imperfect Super Soldier Serum, he allies with MODOK, who uses Hydra technology to transfer his mind to Captain America's body. After his defeat by a reassembled team of Avengers, Red Skull steals Iron Man's armor to use its life support system. Red Skull attacks the Avengers at their mansion, which is destroyed during the fight.

To even the playing field, Red Skull brings together the Cabal, consisting of Attuma, Dracula, the Super-Adaptoid, and Hyperion (He also offers Doctor Doom a spot, but he turns down the offer). The Avengers and S.H.I.E.L.D. intercept Red Skull's transmission, learn of the Cabal's existence, and decide to remain together to battle them.

=== Season 2 ===
The Avengers encounter Red Skull's master, Thanos, who is searching for the Infinity Stones. They collect all five Stones and defeat Thanos, but Ultron absorbs the Stones' power. After the Avengers ultimately defeat Ultron, Ant-Man becomes a new member of the team. Around the end of season two, Thanos manages to escape from a galactic prison that was meant to contain him with aid of the Black Order. Thanos then makes one final attempt to defeat the Avengers. With help from the people of Earth, the Avengers are able to defeat Thanos and the Black Order. In the aftermath, Captain America and Iron Man plan to make Earth an "Avengers World" by recruiting other heroes.

There is also a subplot detailing the arrival of the Squadron Supreme, Hyperion's old team which also consists of Nighthawk, Power Princess, Doctor Spectrum, and Speed Demon. Believed to have died when their home planet was destroyed, they come to Earth in an attempt to conquer it. After going into hiding, the Avengers manage to defeat the Squadron Supreme by waiting until the Squadron's members divide rule of the planet's continents, then they pull a surprise attack and trap each member of the Squadron Supreme. The Squadron Supreme is imprisoned in a special section of the Vault.

=== Season 3: Ultron Revolution ===
The Avengers are forced to cancel their expansion plans and Ant-Man leaves the team due to a lack of global threats. After dealing with A.I.M.'s Scientist Supreme, the Avengers are shocked when Ultron returns and absorbs A.I.M.'s Super-Adaptoid technology. Now Ultron is seeking revenge on the Avengers for foiling his plans with the Infinity Stones' power, while continuing his plot to replace humanity with robots. During Ultron's battle with the Avengers, Terrigen Mist is spread worldwide, activating the superpowers of humans with latent Inhuman genes.

One subplot details Helmut Zemo, son of Captain America's old nemesis Heinrich Zemo, finding a working vial of the Super-Soldier Serum and using it on himself to gain the youth and strength to face the Avengers and avenge his father's death. Zemo recruits the Masters of Evil (which consists of Beetle, Goliath, Screaming Mimi, Fixer, and Moonstone), who masquerade as the Thunderbolts to undermine the Avengers. However, after being saved by Captain America, Songbird eventually convinces the team to reform and turn on Zemo.

When the President signs the New Powers Act, the Avengers are given Truman Marsh as their government liaison, who replaces Hulk with Red Hulk. Marsh is later revealed to be a disguise of Ultron, who mind-controls the Inhumans to attack the Avengers and possesses Iron Man. The Avengers are unable to free Iron Man from Ultron and instead place him in a dimension where technology does not work until they can find a way to drive Ultron out.

=== Season 4: Secret Wars ===
The Avengers' plans to rescue Iron Man experience a major setback when a new version of the Cabal (consisting of Leader, Arnim Zola, Enchantress, Executioner, and Kang the Conqueror) transports them across time and space. Ant-Man, Captain Marvel, Ms. Marvel, Vision, and Wasp work with Jane Foster to rescue them.

It is later revealed that Loki had told a powerful being known as the Beyonder of Earth. He uses the Bifröst to retrieve locations from across the universe and fuse them into the planet Battleworld. With Iron Man back with the team, the Avengers form an unlikely alliance with Loki to rebuild the Bifröst and work with Jane Foster to defeat him after he betrays the group.

=== Season 5: Black Panther's Quest ===
Following Loki's defeat, the Avengers invite Shuri to a party at their tower. However, after an attack by Atlanteans, Black Panther and Shuri set out to stop the Shadow Council, including N'Jadaka, Tiger Shark, M'Baku, and Zanda. T'Challa tries to keep this mission a secret, telling none of the Avengers except Captain America.

The Council seeks an artifact called the Crown, which can access the memories of the deceased. Baron Zemo tries to take the Crown for himself, but it becomes unstable due to being away from Wakanda. Captain America sacrifices himself to absorb the resulting blast, with Black Widow accusing Black Panther of killing him. With the Avengers and the world against him, T'Challa frees Klaw from incarceration to learn of Killmonger's plan. He, Shuri, and Klaw enter the Hall of Royals, a burial ground for Wakanda's deceased royalty, where T'Challa researches the Council's plans. He frees Captain America, who was absorbed into the Crown.

Council member Madame Masque attacks Atlantis, triggering a war between it and Wakanda. However, Bask, the sister of Wakanda's founder Bashenga, sacrifices herself to destroy Masque's laser. She leaves for the afterlife, naming Shuri her successor, while the Crown is destroyed.

== Cast ==
=== Main cast ===
- Laura Bailey – Natasha Romanoff / Black Widow, Gamora (second appearance), Darkstar
- Troy Baker – Clint Barton / Hawkeye, Loki, Doombot, Red Guardian, Whiplash, Kraven the Hunter
- James C. Mathis III – Black Panther, Heimdall (2013–2015), Flint, T'Chaka (young)
- Adrian Pasdar – Tony Stark / Iron Man (season 1–3), Bruto the Strongman
- Bumper Robinson – Sam Wilson / Falcon, Human Cannonball
- Roger Craig Smith – Steve Rogers / Captain America, Torgo, Great Gambonnos, Grim Reaper, Radioactive Man, Nightmare Bucky Barnes / Winter Soldier, Orka
- Fred Tatasciore – Hulk, Thunderball, Volstagg, Ringmaster, Crimson Dynamo, Nightmare Ultron, Black Bolt, Crossbones
- Travis Willingham – Thor, Bulldozer, Trick Shot, Growing Man, Executioner
- Mick Wingert – Tony Stark / Iron Man (season 4–5), Doctor Faustus

=== Additional voices ===
- Jonathan Adams – Carl Creel / Absorbing Man (first appearance)
- Charlie Adler – MODOK
- Ike Amadi – M'Baku
- Hayley Atwell – Peggy Carter
- René Auberjonois – Ebony Maw
- Diedrich Bader – Maximus
- Drake Bell – Peter Parker / Spider-Man (2013–15)
- Bob Bergen – Bucky Barnes / Winter Soldier
- Gregg Berger – Carl Creel / Absorbing Man (second appearance)
- JB Blanc – Mangog
- Brian Bloom – Hyperion
- Steve Blum – Kang the Conqueror
- Dave Boat – Ben Grimm / Thing
- Kimberly Brooks – Shuri (first appearance)
- Clancy Brown – Uatu the Watcher, Thunderbolt Ross / Red Hulk, Taskmaster
- Jesse Burch – Goliath / Atlas, Bruce Banner (third season)
- Corey Burton – Dracula, Agamotto
- Greg Cipes – Danny Rand / Iron Fist
- Cam Clarke – Piledriver
- Jack Coleman – Doctor Strange ("Widow's Run")
- Stephen Collins – Howard Stark
- Will Collyer – Tony Stark (age 14 and 17)
- Chris Cox – Star-Lord ("Guardians and Space Knights")
- Jim Cummings – Ghost
- Elizabeth Daily – Moonstone/Meteorite
- Keith David – T'Chaka
- Robbie Daymond – Bucky Barnes, Peter Parker / Spider-Man (2018)
- Grey DeLisle – Carol Danvers / Captain Marvel, Morgan le Fay
- Antony Del Rio – Dante Pertuz / Inferno
- Trevor Devall – Rocket Raccoon ("Widow's Run"), Ares, Ulysses Klaue (2018–19), Grizzly
- John DiMaggio – Wrecker, Galactus
- Dan Donahue – Attuma (2018–19)
- Robin Atkin Downes – Glorian, Baron Strucker
- Alastair Duncan – Adrian Toomes / Vulture
- Ashley Eckstein – Lady Elanna
- Gideon Emery – Marc Spector / Moon Knight
- Wynn Everett – Madame Masque
- Will Friedle – Peter Quill / Star-Lord ("Widow's Run"), Jeter Kan Toon
- Nika Futterman – Gamora ("Guardians and Space Knights")
- Ralph Garman – Mojo
- Grant George – Scott Lang / Ant-Man (2013–17)
- Clare Grant – Titania
- Seth Green – Rocket Raccoon ("Guardians and Space Knights")
- Tania Gunadi – Iso
- Todd Haberkorn – Haechi
- Ashleigh Hairston – Bask
- Jennifer Hale – Freya, F.R.I.D.A.Y., Screaming Mimi/Songbird, Gabby Talbot, Layla
- Mark Hamill – Arnim Zola
- Mark Hanson – Beetle/MACH-IV, Seeker
- Brandon Hender – Tony Stark (age 8 and 11)
- Danny Jacobs – Heinrich Zemo ("The House of Zemo")
- Jeremy Jackson – X-Ray
- Keston John – Erik Killmonger
- Corey Jones – T'Chanda
- David Kaye – J.A.R.V.I.S., Vision, Space Phantoms, Blood Brother #1, Corvus Glaive Heinrich Zemo (in "Saving Captain Rogers" and "T'Chanda"), Helmut Zemo
- Josh Keaton – Scott Lang / Ant-Man (2017)
- Tom Kenny – Impossible Man, Whirlwind
- Kathreen Khavari – Kamala Khan / Ms. Marvel
- Eric Ladin – Ironclad
- Maurice LaMarche – Victor Von Doom / Doctor Doom
- Phil LaMarr – Doctor Spectrum, Nuke, Dormammu, Baron Mordo, Bashenga
- Matt Lanter – Winter Soldier
- Mela Lee – Princess Zanda
- Stan Lee – Army General
- Erica Lindbeck – Jane Foster
- Chi McBride – Nick Fury
- Daisy Lightfoot – Shuri (fifth season), Dora Milaje members
- Yuri Lowenthal – Egghead
- Erica Luttrell – Aneka
- Vanessa Marshall – Hela, Medusa (third season)
- Matthew Mercer – Hercules, Tiger Shark
- Jim Meskimen – Arsenal, Ultron, Scientist Supreme
- Julie Nathanson – Yelena Belova
- Nolan North – Gorgon
- Liam O'Brien – Red Skull, Blood Brother #2, Doctor Strange (seasons 3-4)
- Scott Porter – White Wolf
- Kevin Michael Richardson – Ulik, Groot, Heimdall (2017)
- Anika Noni Rose – Yemandi
- Roger Rose – Tad McDodd
- Anthony Ruivivar – Nighthawk
- Daryl Sabara – Aaron Reece
- William Salyers – Truman Marsh
- Charlie Schlatter – Howard Stark (young)
- Dwight Schultz – Attuma (2013–18)
- David Shaughnessy – Ulysses Klaue (2016)
- Stephanie Sheh – Crystal
- Kevin Shinick – Bruce Banner (fourth season)
- J. K. Simmons – J. Jonah Jameson
- Isaac C. Singleton Jr. – Thanos
- David Sobolov – Drax the Destroyer
- André Sogliuzzo – Igor Drenkov
- Jason Spisak – Justin Hammer, Speed Demon
- Glenn Steinbaum – Vector
- April Stewart – Lady Zartra, Power Princess
- Tara Strong – Typhoid Mary
- Cree Summer – Darlene Wilson
- Catherine Taber – Medusa (third season), Vapor
- James Arnold Taylor – Leader
- Oliver Vaquer – Karnak
- Kari Wahlgren – Wasp, Proxima Midnight
- Hynden Walch – Princess Python, Supergiant
- Rick D. Wasserman – Fixer/Techno
- Steven Weber – Beyonder
- Frank Welker – Odin
- Debra Wilson – Achebe, Dora Milaje
- Fryda Wolff – Enchantress
- Michael-Leon Wooley – Galen-Kor

== Crew ==
- Jeff Allen – Supervising director
- Amanda Goodbread – Casting and recording manager
- Cort Lane – Executive producer
- Stan Lee – Executive producer
- Joe Moeller – Casting director
- Eric Radomski – Executive producer
- Eugene Son – Story editor
- Collette Sunderman – Casting and voice director
- Stephen Wacker – Executive producer
- Dani Wolff – Story editor

== Episodes ==
Season	Title	Episodes	Originally released	
Season	Title	Episodes	First released	Last released
1	–	26	May 26, 2013	May 25, 2014
2	–	26	September 28, 2014	September 20, 2015
3	Ultron Revolution	26	March 13, 2016	January 28, 2017
Shorts	–	6	June 2, 2017	June 7, 2017
4	Secret Wars	26	June 17, 2017	March 11, 2018
5	Black Panther's Quest	23	September 23, 2018	February 24, 2019

== Production ==
According to Jeph Loeb, the Head of Marvel Television and a producer on the series, Avengers Assemble is intended to closely echo the tone and feel of the 2012 The Avengers film. The series features a combination of 2D and CGI animation.

On July 26, 2014, Disney XD renewed it for a second season, which premiered on September 28, 2014. The third season, Avengers: Ultron Revolution, premiered on March 13, 2016. On January 5, 2017, Disney XD renewed Avengers Assemble for a fourth season titled Avengers: Secret Wars. On July 22, 2017, Disney's official PR feed announced that Avengers Assemble had been renewed for a fifth and final season at San Diego Comic-Con 2017 as Avengers: Black Panther's Quest.

== Release ==
=== Broadcast ===
Avengers Assemble debuted on May 26, 2013, as an hour-long preview. It was followed by the official premiere on July 7, 2013. The first episode was made available free on iTunes on May 21, 2013. The series premiered on Teletoon in Canada on September 6, 2013. It premiered on Disney XD in Australia on October 12, 2014. It premiered on Disney XD in Africa on October 15, 2013. The second season premiered in Africa on March 9, 2015. It premiered on Disney XD in India on December 15, 2013.

== Reception ==
=== Critical response ===
On the review aggregator Rotten Tomatoes, the first season has a 71% approval rating with an average rating of 6.00 out of 10 based on 7 reviews.

Scoot Allan of Screen Rant noted that Avengers Assemble aimed primarily at younger audiences, similar to Disney XD's Ultimate Spider-Man. He explained that after two seasons, the show reinvented itself each year with a new team and title to reflect the season's storyline, such as Avengers: Ultron Revolution, Avengers: Secret Wars, and Avengers: Panther's Quest. Allan acknowledged that the series' kid-friendly focus alienated some fans of the previous show, but still considered it one of the best Avengers animated series due to its reinvention and ability to honor established screen portrayals while adding its own unique twist. Shoshana Kessock of Tor.com stated that Avengers Assemble is the perfect continuation for fans of the Avengers, picking up after the events of the blockbuster film with Tony Stark calling the team back together to face the Red Skull. She praised the series for maintaining strong ties to the film continuity while introducing new adventures each week. Kessock highlighted the addition of Falcon to the cast, a former S.H.I.E.L.D. agent who becomes a superhero, which fueled speculation about the character's role in future films. She noted the show's fast pace and kid-friendly nature, with engaging villains and storylines that stayed true to the Avengers' film portrayals. Kessock also appreciated the show's mix of humor and solid storytelling, which subtly teaches lessons without being overly preachy. She cited an episode featuring The Thing and Spider-Man as a standout moment that gave fans a glimpse into the Hulk's life. Kessock concluded by commending the production team for successfully merging the spirit of the comics with the film world, drawing more fans to the series.

Chris Sims of Looper noted that Avengers Assemble took an interesting approach by opening with the Avengers already broken up, with a depressed Tony Stark attempting to reunite the team, primarily because he lacked other friends. Sims praised the show's premise, which saw the Red Skull stealing Iron Man's armor and forming his own super-team of villains, including Doctor Doom and Dracula, presenting the Avengers with formidable threats. He highlighted how the series focused on the team's need to overcome personal conflicts to face these overwhelming challenges, drawing inspiration from classic storylines like "Under Siege." Sims concluded that the show successfully built to bigger threats with each season, offering a version of the Avengers that fans of the films could recognize, without merely repeating the same storylines. Emily Ashby of Common Sense Media gave Avengers Assemble a grade of 3 out of 5 stars, stating that the show primarily presents violence as the central concern, with the heroes often relying on brute force and weapons, such as guns, to defeat their enemies. She noted that while strategy and teamwork occasionally play a role, the emphasis is largely on physical strength, super speed, and resilience. Ashby mentioned that, although there is frequent bickering and power struggles among the Avengers, the series celebrates their victories as a group, highlighting the importance of teamwork. She acknowledged that the heroes, despite their competitive and egotistical tendencies, ultimately put themselves in harm's way to protect the innocent, citing them as positive role models. Ashby also pointed out that the lone female Avenger often serves as the most level-headed member, contributing significantly to the team's strategic decisions. She concluded overall, "Fast-paced superhero series sequel will be fun for fans."

=== Accolades ===
Year	Award	Category	Nominee(s)	Result	Ref.
2015	Annie Awards	Outstanding Achievement in Music in an Animated TV/Broadcast Production	Lolita Ritmanis, Kristopher Carter, Michael McCuistion	Nominated	
2016	Golden Reel Awards	Best Sound Editing - Sound Effects, Foley, Dialogue and ADR Animation in Television	Avengers Assemble	Nominated	
2017	Golden Reel Awards	Best Sound Editing - Sound Effects, Foley, Dialogue and ADR Animation in Television	Avengers Assemble	Nominated	
