= Doctor Spectrum =

- The Kinji Obatu incarnation of Doctor Spectrum as depicted in Iron Man #63 (October 1973). Art by Gil Kane.

Publication information
- Publisher: Marvel Comics
- First appearance: Villain: The Avengers #69 (November 1969); Hero: The Avengers #85 (February 1971)
- Created by: Roy Thomas (writer); John Buscema (artist)

In-story information
- Alter ego: Kinji Obatu; Billy Roberts; Joseph Ledger
- Species: Human
- Team affiliations: Squadron Sinister; Squadron Supreme (Earth-712); Squadron Supreme (Earth-31916)
- Abilities: Via Power Prism: Flight; Energy projection and manipulation Ability to survive in space Intangibility

Doctor Spectrum is the name of several fictional characters appearing in American comic books published by Marvel Comics. There have been five versions of the character to date—three supervillains from the mainstream Marvel Universe belonging to the team Squadron Sinister (Earth-616) and two heroes from different alternate universes. The two heroes each belong to a version of the team Squadron Supreme, the Squadron Supreme of Earth-712 and the Squadron Supreme of Earth-31916 respectively). Spectrum is a pastiche of DC's Green Lantern.

== Fictional character biography ==
=== Squadron Sinister ===
The first version of the character, Kinji Obatu, appears in The Avengers #69 (Oct. 1969), and is created by Roy Thomas and Sal Buscema. The story arc introduced the supervillain team the Squadron Sinister, created by the Grandmaster to fight the Avengers. The four members were loosely based on heroes in DC Comics' Justice League of America, with Doctor Spectrum based on Green Lantern.

The Grandmaster assembled the Squadron Sinister to battle Kang the Conqueror. Spectrum is defeated when Iron Man deduces that Spectrum's Power Prism (a sentient entity called Krimonn) is vulnerable to ultraviolet light. The Avengers eventually defeat the Squadron and are abandoned by the Grandmaster. Spectrum reappears in the title Iron Man and after a series of battles is defeated when Iron Man crushes the Power Prism. A powerless Obatu is arrested and deported back to his native Uganda. During a subsequent battle with the Thing, Black Panther, and Brother Voodoo, Obatu accidentally falls to his death.

Unknown to Iron Man, the Power Prism reforms and is found by a sanitation worker. They bring it to evangelist Billy Roberts, who becomes the second Doctor Spectrum.

The Squadron reappear in the title Defenders, reunited by the alien Nebulon. The villains receive greater power in exchange for the planet Earth, and create a giant laser cannon in the Arctic to melt the polar ice caps, covering Earth in water. The superhero team the Defenders prevent the scheme and confront the Squadron and Nebulon, with Doctor Strange defeating Spectrum. After this defeat Spectrum and his two remaining teammates are teleported off world by Nebulon, returning with an energy-draining weapon. The Squadron Sinister plan to threaten Earth again, but are defeated once again by the Defenders and Yellowjacket.

The Power Prism is kept by Yellowjacket, who modifies it and gives it to his wife Janet van Dyne as a gift. Krimonn, the entity within the Power Prism, possesses Janet and transforms her into a version of Doctor Spectrum, who battles several Avengers but is then defeated by the Vision's use of the Prism's weakness to ultraviolet radiation. The prism itself bonds to the Wasp in an attempt to save itself, but is eventually removed by Billy Roberts after he is located by the Avengers. Roberts becomes Spectrum once more, although on this occasion the Power Prism is in control and seeks to bond with Thor. The Power Prism succeeds in taking Thor as a host, infecting Mjolnir to use as a focal point to control him and defeat the other Avengers, but fails to take into account that to wield Mjolnir, Thor must be "worthy". No longer worthy to wield Mjolnir due to being tainted by the gem, Thor drops Mjolnir and reverts to his mortal alter-ego Donald Blake, which results in the Power Prism losing control and becoming inert.

The Grandmaster later reforms the Squadron Sinister, bringing in Hank Pym's former lab assistant Alice Nugent to be the new Doctor Spectrum. Courtesy of a phenomenon known as the "Wellspring of Power"—an interdimensional source of superhuman abilities—the Grandmaster increases the Squadron Sinister's powers and they battle the New Thunderbolts. Thunderbolts leader Helmut Zemo defeats the Grandmaster, and in the ensuing chaos, the Squadron escapes.

=== Squadron Supreme ===
Roy Thomas and penciller John Buscema created an alternate-universe team of heroes called the Squadron Supreme, who debut in The Avengers #85 (February 1971). After an initial skirmish with four Avengers, the teams unite to stop a common threat. The characters (including Doctor Spectrum) are identical in name and appearance to the Squadron Sinister.

The character features with the Squadron Supreme in a self-titled 12-issue miniseries (Sept. 1985–Aug. 1986) by writer Mark Gruenwald. Gruenwald revealed each member's origin, with Joseph Ledger being a former astronaut who saves a Skrull in space. The Skrull, called the Skrullian Skymaster, rewards Ledger with the Power Prism. The series also explains why the Squadrons Sinister and Supreme are similar: the Grandmaster created the Squadron Sinister and based them on the Squadron Supreme of Earth-712. Gruenwald, Ryan, and inker Al Williamson created a graphic-novel sequel in which the Squadron Supreme were stranded in Earth-616. Doctor Spectrum and teammates encounter the hero Quasar, and relocate to the government facility Project Pegasus. After another encounter with the Overmind and a visit to the Stranger, the group attempts to return to their universe, and battles the entity Deathurge.

The entire Squadron Supreme appear in a two-part story with the Avengers that returns them to their home universe, where they disband for a time. Doctor Spectrum rejoins his teammates to aid the interdimensional team the Exiles.

=== Supreme Power ===
Joseph Ledger / Doctor Spectrum of Earth-31916 as depicted in Doctor Spectrum #2 (November 2004). Art by John Dell.

The Marvel MAX imprint showcases the adventures of the Earth-31916 version of the Squadron Supreme. The title Supreme Power relates how Joseph Ledger, a soldier in the United States Army, accidentally bonds with a crystal found in the vessel that brought Hyperion to Earth. The story continues in the limited series Doctor Spectrum, written by Sara Barnes and art by John Dell and Travel Foreman, with the experience placing Ledger in a coma, and after reliving his life in his mind for the benefit of the apparently sentient crystal, the character awakens and adopts the codename of Doctor Spectrum. Operating in a military-style uniform as opposed to a prismatic costume, Spectrum encounters and battles Hyperion, forming a truce with him to hunt down super-powered serial killer Michael Redstone. Spectrum also begins a tentative romance with fellow superhuman Amphibian. Both join the US-backed Squadron Supreme in the 2006 title of the same name. Joseph is later killed during a battle with a version of the Squadron Sinister.

=== Squadron Supreme of America ===
A variation of the Joseph Ledger version of Doctor Spectrum appears as a member of the Squadron Supreme of America. This version is a simulacrum created by Mephisto and programmed by the Power Elite. As a civilian, he works as a colonel in the United States Air Force.

== Powers and abilities ==
All versions of Doctor Spectrum derive their abilities from an alien gem called the Power Prism. The original prism, used by the Kinji Obatu and Billy Roberts incarnations of Spectrum, is a sentient being called Krimonn. Krimonn was originally a Skrull who was transformed into a living prism as punishment after a failed attempt to overthrow the Skrull emperor. When the Grandmaster requires champions to battle the Avengers, he retrieves the prism and grants Krimonn several energy-based powers that can be used in conjunction with a host. Kinji Obatu is the first to coin the term "Power Prism", and discovers that although trapped in prism form, Krimonn remains aggressive and asserts his will via telepathy. Krimonn's mind is "muted" by Nebulon when the Power Prism is given to Billy Roberts, although Krimonn reasserts itself during the quest to find and bond with Thor. When the plan fails and the gem is shattered, Krimonn's consciousness apparently dissipated.

Krimonn could bestow on a host the ability to project and manipulate light energy in various colors; create light energy constructs of various shapes, sizes and colors; flight; protection from the rigors of space and the ability to become intangible. The Power Prism is vulnerable to ultraviolet light.

The Earth-712 Doctor Spectrum gains his power the Skrullian Power Prism given to him by the Skrullian Skymaster. When the Power Prism later exploded and fragments of it were embedded in Spectrum, his skin, hair, and costume were bleached chalk-white. The Earth-712 Power Prism possesses the same abilities as the Earth-616 version.

The Earth-31916 Power Prism is a sentient power source removed from the spacecraft that brought Hyperion to Earth.

== Other versions ==
=== Secret Wars (2015) ===
An alternate universe variant of Kinji Ubatu / Doctor Spectrum from Earth-21195 appears in Secret Wars as a resident of Battleworld. This version is Japanese.

=== Great Society (Earth-4290001)/Squadron Supreme (Earth-616) ===
An alternate, female version of Doctor Spectrum appears as a member of the Great Society, a team of Justice League analogues from Earth-4290001. After the Illuminati destroy their Earth to stop the Incursion, she is marooned on Earth-616 and joins its version of the Squadron Supreme.

== In other media ==
The Billy Roberts incarnation of Doctor Spectrum appears in Avengers Assemble, voiced by Phil LaMarr. This version is an alien and a member of the Squadron Supreme who was forced to destroy his home planet by the other Squadron members and was subsequently controlled by the Power Prism. After the Avengers free him, Roberts joins a S.H.I.E.L.D. space program to find a new planet to reside on while the Prism forms a separate body and reunites with the Squadron.
