= Ringmaster (comics) =

Marvel Comics supervillain

The Ringmaster
- The Ringmaster as depicted in The Incredible Hulk #3 (September 1962). Art by Jack Kirby and Dick Ayers.

Publication information
- Publisher: Marvel Comics
- First appearance: The Incredible Hulk #3 (September 1962)
- Created by: Stan Lee; Jack Kirby

In-story information
- Alter ego: Maynard Tiboldt
- Species: Human
- Team affiliations: Circus of Crime
- Notable aliases: Circus Master of Ceremonies; Martin Thraller
- Abilities: Hypnotic mind control via device on his hat Formerly: Reality manipulation via cosmic powered ring

The Ringmaster is the name of two characters appearing in American comic books published by Marvel Comics. The first incarnation of Ringmaster, Fritz Tiboldt, first appeared in Captain America Comics #5 (August 1941). The second incarnation, Fritz Tiboldt's son Maynard Tiboldt, debuted in The Incredible Hulk #3 (July 1962).

== Publication history ==
Fritz Tiboldt debuted as the Ringmaster of Death in Captain America Comics #5 (August 1941). He appeared in Captain America #112 in a flashback (April 1969).

Maynard Tiboldt debuted as the Ringmaster in The Incredible Hulk #3 (July 1962). He has turned up as a somewhat pathetic and luckless opponent for virtually every hero in the Marvel universe since his first appearance, ranging from Spider-Man to Howard the Duck. He is a tall thin man who sports a Fu Manchu moustache and dresses in a green variation on the traditional circus ringmaster costume. Having acquired a hypnosis-wave generator originally created by the Red Skull and mounted said device in his costume's top hat, the Ringmaster's usual scheme is to lead his Circus of Crime into a community and rob citizens as they attend his circus. Nearly every appearance of the Ringmaster ends with him being thrown back into jail, having been defeated by his current foe.

== Fictional character biography ==
=== Fritz Tiboldt ===
The original Ringmaster is a Nazi agent named Fritz Tiboldt whose circus was a cover for murdering US government officials. He traveled with Missing Link who had primate-like features, midget Tommy Thumb; snake charmer Omar; strongman Zandow, and the Trapeze Trio. After Ringmaster uses a tiger to murder a U.S. sergeant, Captain America and Bucky become suspicious of their activities. The Ringmaster kidnaps Betsy Ross, and the heroes trace him and his circus and defeat the foes.

Fritz and his wife are killed by the Nazis for their defeat at the hands of Captain America. Following the introduction of Maynard Tiboldt, Fritz was revealed to be his father.

=== Maynard Tiboldt ===
Maynard Tiboldt was born in Vienna, Austria to the original Ringmaster, Fritz Tiboldt, and his wife Lola. He inherited the Circus when his parents were murdered.

The Ringmaster is a powerless man with a unique hat which is designed to hypnotize people, thus allowing him to take complete control over their actions. He originally travels across America as the manager, director, and ringmaster of his small traveling circus, which is a front for his "Circus of Crime", consisting of Human Cannonball, Clown, Bruto the Strongman, the Great Gambonnos (two acrobat brothers), and snake charmer Princess Python. During his shows, Ringmaster hypnotizes the crowd and sends his lackeys to steal valuables. Once, he managed to enslave the Hulk when he was under the control of Rick Jones, who was attending a performance. However, the Hulk captures Ringmaster when he tries to escape in a chariot.

Following several encounters with the Hulk and other heroes, Ringmaster attempts to reform, but helps the Circus of Crime escape from the police after battling Power Pack. He is later released from prison and placed into Doc Samson's custody. Working alongside Samson, Ringmaster uses his hypnotism to make Bruce Banner revisit his traumatic childhood. Banner, the Hulk, and the Gray Hulk eventually agree to work together, creating the Merged Hulk personality.

The Ringmaster is given surgical alterations that allow him to hypnotize others with his eyes from surgeons working for Devlin DeAngelo. As "Martin Thraller", the Ringmaster employs his hypnotic abilities while running for president of the United States until he is stopped by Deathlok.

The Ringmaster travels to Tibet and steals a ring made from a piece of a shattered Cosmic Cube that allows him to manipulate reality within a fifteen-foot radius. Attacking New York for 'practice', he clashes with various superheroes, including Spider-Man and Moon Knight. The Punisher shoots off Ringmaster's ring finger, which is later surgically reattached. Ringmaster loses his ring after he is attacked by a M.O.D.O.C. squad. The ring is found by Curtis Doyle, who uses it to become the superhero Freedom Ring.

During the "Gang War" storyline, Ringmaster gains control of Randalls and Wards Islands. He is briefly seen hypnotizing civilians to fight for him. Ringmaster's hypnotized civilians fight against Crime Master and the A.I.M. agents with him. As Spider-Man and Spider-Woman fight Crime Master, Ringmaster tries to hypnotize Elektra, only for her to resist the mind control and defeat him.

Ringmaster was revealed to have a daughter who became Ringmistress, wielding a copy of her father's hat and leading a separate incarnation of the Circus of Crime.

== Powers and abilities ==
The Ringmaster possesses no inherent superhuman powers. His principal weapons are mind-controlling devices implanted in his hat and eyes. However, his hypnotism does not work on those who cannot see and can be neutralized with special glasses.

With the Cosmic Ring, Tiboldt gained the ability to alter reality in a 15-foot (4.6 m) radius around him.

== In other media ==
=== Television ===
- The Ringmaster appears in the "Incredible Hulk" segment of The Marvel Super Heroes, voiced by Rod Coneybeare.
- The Ringmaster appears in the Spider-Man episode "Carnival of Crime", voiced by G. Stanley Jones.
- The Ringmaster appears in The Avengers: United They Stand episode "Comes a Swordsman", voiced by Normand Bissonnette.
- The Ringmaster appears in The Super Hero Squad Show, voiced by Carlos Alazraqui. This version is a member of Doctor Doom's Lethal Legion.
- The Ringmaster appears in the Avengers Assemble episode "Crime and Circuses", voiced by Fred Tatasciore. This version wields flamethrower gloves in addition to his top hat and can vanish in a cloud of smoke.
- Maynard Tiboldt appears in the Jessica Jones episode "AKA Sole Survivor", portrayed by Ben Van Bergen. This version is a hypnotherapist.

=== Video games ===
The Ringmaster appears as a non-playable character in Questprobe featuring Spider-Man.

=== Miscellaneous ===
The Ringmaster appears in Marvel's Wastelanders: Hawkeye, voiced by Joe Morton.
