= Strongman (character) =

Fictional comic book characters

The Strongman is the name of three characters appearing in American comic books published by Marvel Comics.

== Publication history ==
The Bruce Olafson incarnation of Strongman first appeared in The Incredible Hulk #3 (September 1962) as a member of the Circus of Crime, and was created by Stan Lee and Steve Ditko. The character subsequently appears in The Amazing Spider-Man #16 (September 1964), The Avengers #22 (November 1965), Thor #145 (October 1967), Ghost Rider #72-73 (September–October 1982), The Sensational She-Hulk #1 (May 1989), and X-Men and Power Pack #3 (February 2006). The Strongman appeared as part of the "Circus of Crime" entry in the Official Handbook of the Marvel Universe Deluxe Edition #2.

== Fictional character biography ==
=== Bruce Olafsen ===
Strongman

Publication information
- Publisher: Marvel Comics
- First appearance: Incredible Hulk #3 (September 1962)
- Created by: Stan Lee; Steve Ditko

In-story information
- Alter ego: Bruce Olafsen
- Team affiliations: Circus of Crime
- Notable aliases: Bruto
- Abilities: Skilled wrestler

Bruce Olafsen was born in Stockholm, Sweden, but later came to the United States and became a naturalized American citizen. As a longtime member of the criminal organization Circus of Crime, Olafsen works as a circus strongman and weight-lifter. He has particularly strong biceps and teeth.

Bruto first assists the Circus of Crime in hypnotizing and robbing the people who attended the circus, with Rick Jones being among their victims. When Hulk comes bursting through the tent, Strongman and the rest of the Circus of Crime attack Hulk, who is hypnotized by the Ringmaster. The next day, Hulk escapes Ringmaster's control and defeats the Circus of Crime before leaving with Rick.

Strongman is later seen with Ringmaster when he hypnotizes Daredevil into serving him. Spider-Man manages to break Daredevil free of the hypnosis as they both defeat the Circus of Crime.

Strongman is seen at the Circus of Crime when Hawkeye, Quicksilver, and Scarlet Witch intend to join the circus, unaware that it is a front. Strongman and the Circus flee, claiming that the three superheroes were trying to rob them.

After Strongman strains himself trying to lift an elephant, Ringmaster holds auditions for a temporary strongman to cover for him.

Strongman is present when Ringmaster forces Black Goliath to join the Circus of Crime and hypnotizes Power Man as well. After the hypnosis is undone, Power Man battles the rest of the Circus of Crime and frees Black Goliath from their control. The two then turn the hypnosis effect on the Circus of Crime and leave them for the police.

In Secret Empire, Strongman and the Circus of Crime join Helmut Zemo's Army of Evil.

=== Percy Van Norton ===
Percy Van Norton took a serum which made him into a "perfect human" with a range of superhuman abilities. Although he started out fighting crime, something went wrong and he turned bad, resulting in him becoming a Nazi and joining the Battle-Axis. Van Norton joins the Battle-Axis in their fight against the Invaders. At the end of the battle, Van Norton and the other Battle-Axis members are defeated and captured.

Strongman is based on the Golden Age character of the same name, who first appeared in Crash Comics #2 (May 1940) and had since fallen into the public domain.

=== Spider-Squad's Strongman ===
The third Strongman appears as a member of the Spider-Squad, who Anton DeLionatus used in a failed attempt to gain money before being defeated by Spider-Man.

== Powers and abilities ==
The Bruce Olafsen incarnation of Strongman has no superhuman powers, but is strong and a skilled wrestler.

The Percy Van Norton incarnation of Strongman possesses superhuman physical abilities derived from drugs.

== In other media ==
- The Bruce Olafsen incarnation of Strongman appears in the Spider-Man episode "Carnival of Crime".
- The Bruce Olafsen incarnation of Strongman appears in the Avengers Assemble episode "Crime and Circuses", voiced by Adrian Pasdar.
