= Human Cannonball (Marvel Comics) =

Comic book character owned by Marvel Comics

- The Human Cannonball as depicted in The Incredible Hulk #471 (October 1998).

Publication information
- Publisher: Marvel Comics
- First appearance: The Incredible Hulk #3 (September 1962)
- Created by: Stan Lee; Jack Kirby

In-story information
- Alter ego: Jack Pulver
- Team affiliations: Circus of Crime; The Masters of Menace
- Notable aliases: Cannonball; The Man Called Cannonball
- Abilities: Carries a mace Padded steel armor grants minimal protection from physical attacks Trailer mounted air-cannon

Human Cannonball (Jack Pulver) is a supervillain appearing in American comic books published by Marvel Comics.

== Publication history ==
The Human Cannonball first appeared in The Incredible Hulk #3 (September 1962) as a member of the Circus of Crime, and was created by Stan Lee and Jack Kirby.

The character subsequently appears in The Amazing Spider-Man #16 (September 1964), #22 (March 1965), The Avengers #22 (November 1965), The Amazing Spider-Man Annual #2 (1965), Thor #145-147 (October–December 1967), Marvel Spectacular #15-17 (July–September 1975), Super-Villain Team-Up #8 (October 1976), Ghost Rider #72-73 (September–October 1982), and X-Men and Power Pack #3 (February 2006).

The Human Cannonball appeared as part of the "Circus of Crime" entry in The Official Handbook of the Marvel Universe Deluxe Edition #2.

== Fictional character biography ==
Jack Pulver is a member of the Circus of Crime, and works as a human cannonball and acrobat who specializes in being shot out of a cannon. He wears a costume and helmet that protects him from injury. He initially wears a red crash helmet and purple jumpsuit. In a battle with the Hulk, he has himself shot out of his cannon at him with no other weapon but a replica of Mjolnir. The Hulk punches him right up through the top of the circus tent.

When the Circus of Crime next appears, Pulver has changed his outfit. His costume is now orange and he has replaced the crash helmet with a metal bullet-shaped hat to use his head as a battering ram. However, this does not help him in battle with Spider-Man and Daredevil, who steer him into a crash with a group of circus rubes.

Frustrated by this defeat, Cannonball is more than willing to throw in with the Clown, Princess Python and the Great Gambonnos. They kick the Ringmaster out and become the Masters of Menace, a name Princess Python thinks up, led by Clown. When Spider-Man attacks the Masters of Menace at their hideout, Spider-Man "wonks" Cannonball on the top of his bullet hat, crumpling it and knocking it down over his eyes.

Human Cannonball later appears as a member of Hood's crime syndicate.

== Powers and abilities ==
The Human Cannonball wears padded steel armor to protect his head, shoulders, wrists and feet from the effects of his attack. The armor also offers some protection from physical attacks. He usually uses a trailer mounted air cannon to fire himself at opponents or onto buildings. He sometimes carries a mace to hit opponents as he flies by them.

== In other media ==
- Human Cannonball appears in "The Incredible Hulk" segment of The Marvel Super Heroes.
- Human Cannonball appears in the Spider-Man episode "Carnival of Crime".
- Human Cannonball appears in the Avengers Assemble episode "Crime and Circuses", voiced by Bumper Robinson.
