= Nebulon (comics) =

- Cover to Defenders #34

Publication information
- Publisher: Marvel Comics
- First appearance: Defenders #13 (May 1974)
- Created by: Len Wein and Sal Buscema

In-story information
- Species: Ul'lula'n
- Team affiliations: Former leader of the Celestial Mind Control Movement
- Notable aliases: The Celestial Man, Mr. Nebul, Dorma

Nebulon is a fictional character appearing in American comic books published by Marvel Comics.

== Fictional character biography ==
Nebulon is an Ul'lula'n, an aquatic alien with six tentacles and fins. He is one of a number of Ul'lula'ns dispatched to find worlds with mineral resources that they had depleted on their own home-world of Ul'ula. Nebulon disguises himself as a humanoid in an attempt to blend with Earth's human population. Nebulon encounters Hyperion of the Squadron Sinister, who had been trapped in outer space, and rescues him. Hyperion helps Hyperion gather the other Squadron Sinister members to build a laser cannon that will melt the polar ice caps and flood Earth, making it habitable to the Ul'lula'ns. Nighthawk, a former Squadron Sinister member, contacts the Defenders, who travel to the North Pole and battle the Squadron Sinister. Nighthawk turns Nebulon's cannon against him, causing him to seemingly implode.

In reality, Nebulon retreats to another dimension called Zaar, inhabited by the Ludberdites. Nebulon adopts the Ludberdites' philosophy of improving the lives of "lesser" beings, and returns to Earth to save its people from themselves. In the guise of "Mr. Nebul," he plots to drain people of their free will. The Defenders and the Headmen convince Nebulon of the futility of his goal, and Doctor Strange persuades him to leave Earth.

When the Ul'lula'n government learns of Nebulon's activities, he is tried and convicted of treason. Nebulon is stripped of his power, trapped in his humanoid form, and exiled to Earth. Nebulon's wife, Supernalia, learns of his dishonor and travels to Earth to convince him to do the right thing. Nebulon is planning to use his technology to siphon power from the Avengers and restore his powers. Supernalia convinces the Defenders to help her, and the Defenders and Avengers are manipulated into fighting each other. Supernalia realizes that her own actions violate their people's ethics and throws herself into the energy-draining ray; Nebulon tries to save her, but falls into the ray himself, with both him and Supernalia being killed.

Years after his death, Nebulon is revealed to have been sent to Hell, where he meets the demons Mog'rys and Borss. The two demons return Nebulon to Earth, where he takes control of the Train, a massive engine that pulls planets into its orbit. However, Doctor Strange disrupts Nebulon's control, causing the Train to shift course slightly and miss Earth.

== Powers and abilities ==
Nebulon is an alien who possesses superhuman strength, durability, and reflexes. He has the ability to manipulate energy to use it for various effects, such as creating spheres, shields, or bolts of energy, teleportation anywhere on the surface of a planet or between dimensions, and shape-shifting. Nebulon's powers are dependent on biospheric energy generated by planets. If he is deprived of contact with a planetary biosphere long enough, his power level is reduced to that of a human.
