= Trask =

== People with the surname Trask ==
- Alan Trask, American farmer and politician
- Betty Trask, English romantic novelist
- Clara Augusta Jones Trask (1839-1905), American writer
- Diana Trask, a singer
- Elbridge Trask, a mountain man
- Eliphalet Trask, a politician
- Gustavus Trask, the governor of Sailors' Snug Harbor
- Haunani-Kay Trask, an activist and writer
- John Trask (disambiguation)
- Katrina Trask, an author and philanthropist
- Keith Trask, a rower
- Kyle Trask (born 1998), an American football player
- Larry Trask, a linguist
- Laura Trask, New Zealand politician
- Leonard Trask, famous 1860s medical curiosity
- Mililani Trask, an activist
- Orville Trask, an American football player
- Ozell Miller Trask, U.S. federal judge
- Sigourney Trask, an American physician and missionary
- Spencer Trask, a financier and philanthropist
- Stephen Trask (Stephen Rhodes Schwartz), a musician and composer
- Sylvanus Trask, American politician
- Wayland Trask, Jr., American silent film actor

== In fiction ==
- Oliver Trask, a character on The O.C.
- Father Trask, a minor character that appears in "The Wedding from Hell", an episode of Charmed who is a part of a secret organization to stop Hecate.
- Trask Ulgo, a character in the video game Star Wars: Knights of the Old Republic
- Reverend Trask, a character in the 1960s soap opera Dark Shadows.
- The Trask family, characters in John Steinbeck's 1952 novel East of Eden
- Trask Industries, a company owned by the Trask family in Working Girl
- Trask security, a company handling kidnapping and ransom cases in Studio 60 on the Sunset Strip
- Jason Trask, a rogue government agent in episodes of Lois and Clark: The New Adventures of Superman
- Frank Trask, a guide in Jasper National Park in the novel Icefields by Thomas Wharton

=== Marvel Comics ===
Characters appearing with the last name in stories of the X-Men:

- Bolivar Trask, military scientist and creator of the Sentinels
- Simon Trask, brother of Bolivar Trask and founder of Humanity's Last Stand
- Larry Trask, mutant son of Bolivar Trask
- Marshal Bartholomew "Bat" Trask, "malform" hunter in the DC/Marvel Amalgam Comics Generation Hex

== See also ==
- Trask Coliseum
- Trask Mountain
- Trask River
- Trask Scout Reservation
- TRASK (computer)
