= Philip Le Gros =

English cricketer (1892–1980)

Personal information
- Full name: Philip Walter Le Gros
- Born: 3 October 1892; Reigate, Surrey, England
- Died: 27 February 1980 (aged 87); Richmond, London, England
- Batting: Right-handed
- Bowling: Right-arm fast
- Relatives: William Trask (uncle); Betty Trask (cousin)

Domestic team information
- Years: Team
- 1911–1930: Buckinghamshire
- 1921–1922: Marylebone Cricket Club
- 1924: Minor Counties

Career statistics
Competition	First-class
Matches	4
Runs scored	94
Batting average	15.66
100s/50s	0/1
Top score	51
Balls bowled	18
Wickets	0
Bowling average	–
5 wickets in innings	–
10 wickets in match	–
Best bowling	–
Catches/stumpings	1/–
- Source: Cricinfo, 26 May 2011

Philip Walter Le Gros (3 October 1892 – 27 February 1980) was an English cricketer. Le Gros was a right-handed batsman who bowled right-arm fast. He was born at Reigate, Surrey.

Gros made his debut for Buckinghamshire in the 1912 Minor Counties Championship against Berkshire. He continued to play Minor counties cricket for Buckinghamshire following the First World War, representing the county from 1920 to 1935. He played a total of 80 Minor Counties Championship matches for Buckinghamshire. His first-class debut came for the Gentlemen of England against a Combined Services cricket team in 1920. He played two first-class matches for the Marylebone Cricket Club, one in 1921 against Oxford University, and one in 1922 against Cambridge University. He played his final first-class match for a combined Minor Counties cricket team against HDG Leveson-Gower's XI. It was in this match he scored his only half century, making 51 runs. He scored a total of 94 runs at an average of 15.66 in his 4 first-class matches.

He died at Richmond, Surrey, on 27 February 1980. His uncle, William Trask, was a first-class cricketer for Somerset.
