= Features of the Marvel Universe =

List about the Marvel Universe

The comic book stories published by Marvel Comics since the 1940s have featured several noteworthy concepts besides its fictional characters, such as unique places and artifacts. There follows a list of those features.

== Places ==
Certain places feature prominently in the Marvel Universe, some real-life, others fictional and unique to the setting; fictional places may appear in conjunction with, or even within, real-world locales.

=== Earth ===
==== New York City ====
Many Marvel Comics stories are set in New York City, where the publishing company is based.

===== Superhero sites =====
New York is the site of many places important to superheroes:

- Avengers Mansion: Currently in ruin, but long the home of the Avengers.
- Avengers Tower: Formerly Stark Tower, the current headquarters of the Avengers.
- Alias Investigations: A private investigations firm founded and owned by Jessica Jones.
- Baxter Building and Four Freedoms Plaza: The bases of the Fantastic Four.
- Daily Bugle: A newspaper building where Peter Parker (Spider-Man), among others, work.
- District X: A ghetto-like neighborhood of New York primarily populated by mutants. Since the Decimation, its mutant population has largely disappeared.
- Fisk Towers: A skyscraper owned by the Kingpin, and base of operations for his criminal activities.
- Hell's Kitchen: Home and protectorate of the Defenders (Daredevil, Jessica Jones, Luke Cage and Iron Fist), and the Punisher.
- Jarvis Lounge: Dr. Vernon Van Dyne's former penthouse was later renovated into being the Jarvis Lounge which was named after Edwin Jarvis who also works there. The Jarvis Lounge serves as a base for the Avengers as well as a bar/lounge and a lounge.
- Metro-General Hospital: A public hospital located in Manhattan.
- Nelson and Murdock Law Offices: The law firm founded by Matt Murdock (Daredevil) and Foggy Nelson.
- Sanctum Sanctorum: The abode of Doctor Strange located in Greenwich Village.
- Oscorp Tower: A skyscraper owned by Norman Osborn. Now the headquarters for Alchemax.
- The Bowery: In Fantastic Four #4 (1962), the Human Torch discovers the Namor in this Manhattan neighborhood of "human derelicts", where Namor had taken up residence after sustaining amnesia.
- Wakandan embassy: The consulate/embassy of Black Panther's nation of Wakanda.

===== Companies =====
New York is a center of industry, serving as the headquarters for a few Marvel companies:

- Alchemax: A megacorporation owned by Tyler Stone. Alchemax was created for the Marvel 2099 imprint, where the company appeared as an opponent of Spider-Man 2099 (Miguel O'Hara). O'Hara later gains control of Alchemax, making it into a force for rebuilding Earth after multiple cataclysms. Alchemax was later introduced into the mainline Marvel universe.
  - Alchemax in other media
    - The Earth-928 incarnation of Alchemax appears in the Ultimate Spider-Man episode "The Spider-Verse".
    - The Earth-616 incarnation of Alchemax appears in the Marvel's Spider-Man episode "Cloak and Dagger". This version is a science firm run by Tiberius Stone.
    - Alchemax appears in Spider-Man: Into the Spider-Verse and Spider-Man: Across the Spider-Verse. This version is run by Olivia Octavius and funded by the Kingpin.
    - The Earth-928 incarnation of Alchemax appears in Spider-Man: Shattered Dimensions, with Serena Patel, head of the company's Shadow Division, as a notable employee.
    - Both the Earth-928 and Earth-616 incarnations of Alchemax appear in Spider-Man: Edge of Time.
    - The Earth-928 incarnation of Alchemax appears in Lego Marvel Super Heroes 2.
    - The Earth-616 incarnation of Alchemax appears in Marvel's Spider-Man. This version is a chemical plant located in Manhattan.
    - Alchemax appears in Marvel Rivals.
- Cross Technological Enterprises: A multinational industrial company run by Darren Cross. It is a rival of Stark Industries.
- Damage Control: A construction company that specializes in repairing the property damaged by super-powered individuals.
- Fisk Industries: A legitimate business on the surface founded and owned by Wilson Fisk.
- Frost International: A multi billion-dollar electronics conglomerate run by Emma Frost.
- Hammer Industries: A company founded and owned by Justin Hammer.
- Horizon Labs: A technological company headed by Max Modell.
- Midas Foundation: A company that was founded by Doctor Midas.
- Oscorp: A company founded and formerly owned by Norman Osborn.
- Parker Industries: A company founded and owned by Peter Parker.
- Pym Technologies: A biochemical company founded by Hank Pym.
- Roxxon Energy Corporation: A conglomerate corporation and one of the largest fuel companies in the world. It is inspired by, and initially loosely modeled after, real-world fuel company ExxonMobil.
- Stark Industries: A technology company founded and owned by Isaac Stark Sr. It is currently owned by Tony Stark (Iron Man).
- Trask Industries: A weapons and technology company founded and owned by Bolivar Trask.
- Von Doom Industries: An international megacorporation founded by Victor von Doom, who is the CEO.

===== Universities =====
- Columbia University: A real university whose fictional alumni include Matt Murdock (Daredevil), Elektra, and Reed Richards (Mister Fantastic). It is featured in the Sam Raimi Spider-Man films.
- Empire State University (ESU): A university whose alumni include Peter Parker (Spider-Man), Harry Osborn, Gwen Stacy, Emma Frost, Brad Davis, Chip Martin, and Johnny Storm (the Human Torch). Doreen Green (Squirrel Girl) is currently enrolled in its computer science undergraduate program. Kamala Khan (Ms. Marvel) and Sophie Cuckoo are enrolled in the university in post-Krakoan Age stories. Faculty included Miles Warren, Edward Lansky, Mendel Stromm, Gregson Gilbert, Clifton Shallot, David Jude, Curtis Connors, and David Alleyne.
  - Empire State University in other media
    - Empire State University appears in Spider-Man: The Animated Series.
    - Empire State University appears in The Spectacular Spider-Man.
    - Empire State University appears in Spider-Man (2018).
    - Empire State University appears in Spider-Man: Brand New Day.
- Sotomayor University: A fictional university whose students include America Chavez (Ms. America) and David Alleyne (Prodigy). The university is named after Supreme Court Justice Sonia Sotomayor.

==== Regions and countries ====
- Atlantis: A small continent with many human settlements. Over 20,000 years ago, an event called the "Great Cataclysm" caused it to be submerged into the sea.
- Attilan (/ˈætɪlɑːn/; also known as the Hidden Land): Home of the Inhumans. Originally an island in the Atlantic Ocean, it has moved several times, including to the Andes, the Himalayas, the Moon, and Hala, the homeworld of the Kree. Attilan is destroyed in Infinity, with its remains becoming a sovereign state, New Attilan, ruled by Medusa.
  - Attilan in other media
    - Attilan appears in The New Fantastic Four episode "Medusa and the Inhumans". This city is solely ruled by Medusa.
    - Attilan appears in the Fantastic Four (1994) three-part episode "Inhumans Saga".
    - Attilan appears in the Disney XD Marvel series Hulk and the Agents of S.M.A.S.H., Ultimate Spider-Man, Guardians of the Galaxy, and Avengers Assemble.
    - Attilan appears in Marvel Future Avengers.
    - Attilan appears in Inhumans (2017).
- Bagalia: A sovereign island nation in an undisclosed location. It was founded by the Shadow Council and is ruled by criminals.
- Chronopolis: The city-state headquarters of Kang the Conqueror, located on the outskirts of the timeless dimension Limbo. It also appears in Lego Marvel Super Heroes 2.
- Costa Verde: A country in Central America where Silverclaw was born.
- Demonica: An island north of Hawaii created by Doctor Demonicus; it eventually sinks back into the Pacific.
- Deviant Lemuria: The undersea home of the Deviants located at the bottom of the Pacific Ocean.
- Dynamo City: An interstellar city and space port for dynamism controlled by a municipal government.
- Genosha: An island nation off the coast of Africa, north of Madagascar, where mutants were once enslaved.
- Hyboria: The main continent of the Hyborian Age where Conan the Barbarian lived.
- Imaya: A country in North Africa.
- Kamar-Taj: A small kingdom in the Himalayas.
- Krakoa: A living island in the South Pacific.
- Latveria: A country in Europe ruled by Doctor Doom.
- Lemuria: A small continent and group of islands in the Pacific Ocean 21,000 years ago, which was ruled by the Deviants. It was sunk underwater during a battle with Atlantis.
- Madripoor: A city modeled after Singapore, to which Wolverine has connections.
- Monster Isle: An island where kaiju-style monsters rule.
- Muir Island: An island off the northwest coast of Scotland, containing Moira MacTaggert's mutant research lab.
- Nova Roma: An ancient Rome-like city in Brazil where Magma was born.
- Olympia: Mountain city of the Eternals, located on Mount Olympus in Greece.
- Providence: An artificial island made of parts from Cable's old space station, Graymalkin, located in the South Pacific Ocean, southwest of Hawaii. Providence was intended to be a place where the best minds on Earth could gather, live, and find new ways of doing everything in hopes of giving the world a peaceful future. Cable later destroys Providenceto keep the future evidence of the Messiah Child's birth away from the Marauders.
- Savage Land: A place with a tropical climate, prehistoric animals, and strange tribes located in the heart of Antarctica.
- The Seven Heavenly Cities (also known as the Seven Capital Cities of Heaven): Mystical, hidden cities spread across the Earth. Each of these cities possesses a legendary champion known as the Immortal Weapon, who represents it in the Tournament of Heaven, a sacred tournament held every 88 years, in which the cities temporarily merge to form the Heart of Heaven, where the tournament takes place.
  - K'un-Lun: Home of the legendary Iron Fist. Ruled by the Yu-Ti.
  - K'un-Zi: A city of dark magic ruled by the Crane Mother. It was protected by the Crane Champion.
  - Tiger Island: A tropical land renowned for its women warriors. It was protected by Tiger's Beautiful Daughter.
  - Peng Lai: A peaceful island of pig farmers. It was protected by a long line of warriors known as the Cobra.
  - Kingdom of Spiders: A dark city covered in spiderwebs. It was protected by the Bride of Nine Spiders.
  - Z'Gambo: Home to the Prince of Orphans.
  - Under City: A city that serves as a home to all who are truly lost. The city was ruled by Dog Brother #1, who frequently roamed the Earth to find and rescue people to take them there.
  - Eighth City: A brutal and hellish city that serves as a prison for those sent from the other seven cities.
- Slorenia: An eastern Slavic nation.
- Sokovia: An Eastern European nation that was created for the Marvel Cinematic Universe (MCU) before being integrated into the comics. In the MCU, Helmut Zemo, Wanda Maximoff, and Pietro Maximoff are depicted as Sokovian.
- Subterranea: A vast underground region. It is the home of the Mole Man, Tyrannus, and various underground creatures who serve them.
- Symkaria: A country in Europe adjoining Latveria and home of Silver Sable.
- Transia: A country in Balkans. The birthplace of Spider-Woman, Quicksilver, and the Scarlet Witch. The men of the Russoff line were afflicted with the curse of lycanthropy in Transia. It is the base of operations for the High Evolutionary, and source of the "radioactive clay" used by the Puppet Master. One location is Mount Wundagore, a mountain to which Chthon was bound.
- Vorozheika: A country to the northeast of Chechnya. It is formerly part of the USSR and now ruled by Druig.
- Wakanda: An African nation ruled by T'Challa, the current Black Panther.

==== Prisons ====
- Alcatraz is a real-life island prison in San Francisco Bay. In the Marvel universe, it held superhuman criminals in special section in the 1940s. In Dark Reign, Alcatraz is occupied by H.A.M.M.E.R. and used as a detention center for mutants.
- Alamogordo is a nuclear testing facility and prison located in New Mexico. It first appeared in X-Men (vol. 2) #12 (1992).
- The Cage is a prison that uses a special force field to depower inmates based on a remote island in international waters. The Cage was home to four prison gangs: a group of Maggia loyalists, the Skulls (a white supremacist gang loyal to the Red Skull), the Brothers (a black prison gang), and the Cruisers (a cabal of sexual predators who preyed on the other inmates as best as they could). The Cage was later shut down and replaced by the Raft.
- Crossmore Prison is a British prison previously known simply as 'Crossmoor'. Deadpool and Juggernaut were its known inmates.
- The Cube is a prison for super-powered beings, such as the Hulk, the Abomination, Absorbing Man and the Leader. The prison was created by writer Grant Morrison and artist J. G. Jones in Marvel Boy vol. 2 #6 (2000). Its location is undisclosed and only high-ranking S.H.I.E.L.D. agents know of its existence.
  - Cube in other media
    - The Cube appears in The Avengers: Earth's Mightiest Heroes.
- The Ice Box is a Canadian maximum security prison.
  - Ice Box in other media
    - The Ice Box appears in Deadpool 2, where it houses mutant fugitives, such as Deadpool, Russell Collins, Black Tom Cassidy and Juggernaut.
- Lang Memorial Penitentiary (also known as the Pym Experimental Prison and ironically dubbed "The Big House") inmates in the facility are shrunk down using Pym particles for cheaper storage and easier control. It is also known as the "Ant Hill" due to operators using versions of the Ant-Man helmet to influence ants to act as security with Roberto Dawber as the warden.
  - Lang Memorial Penitentiary in other media
    - The Big House appears in The Avengers: Earth's Mightiest Heroes. This version was developed by Hank Pym and is housed in the S.H.I.E.L.D. Helicarrier and maintained by benign Ultron sentries.
- Project P.E.G.A.S.U.S. (Potential Energy Group, Alternate Sources, United States) is a government facility that researches alternative and unusual forms of energy. It is later used as a prison for individuals with energy-based powers.
  - Project P.E.G.A.S.U.S. in other media
    - Project P.E.G.A.S.U.S. appears in Iron Man: Armored Adventures. This version is an energy research facility led by Russian scientist Anton Harchov and located in New York City that is later absorbed into Stark International under Obadiah Stane.
    - Project Pegasus appears in media set in the Marvel Cinematic Universe (MCU).
- The Raft is a prison facility for superhuman criminals (predominantly supervillains). Created by writer Brian Michael Bendis and artist David Finch, it first appeared in New Avengers #1 (2005) as the "Maximum-Maximum Security" wing of Ryker's Island.
  - Raft in other media
    - The Raft appears in The Avengers: Earth's Mightiest Heroes.
    - The Raft appears in media set in the Marvel Cinematic Universe (MCU).
    - The Raft appears in Lego Marvel Super Heroes.
    - The Raft appears in Marvel Future Avengers.
    - The Raft appears in Spider-Man.
    - The Raft appears in Marvel Ultimate Alliance 3: The Black Order.
    - The Raft makes a minor appearance in Spider-Man 2.
- Ravencroft is a maximum-security asylum, primarily appearing in association with Spider-Man. The institute was first mentioned in Web of Spider-Man #112, written by Terry Kavanagh. The institute officially opens in Web of Spider-Man Annual #10 (1994), written by Terry Kavanagh, with art by Jerry Bingham. The place later grew to one of the leading maximum-security facilities in the country specializing in the treatment of superhuman criminals. The Ruins of Ravencroft storyline reveals that Ravencroft was a site for superhuman experiments during the 20th century.
  - Ravencroft in other media
    - Ravencroft appears in Spider-Man: The Animated Series.
    - Ravencroft appears in The Spectacular Spider-Man.
    - Ravencroft appears in The Amazing Spider-Man 2.
    - Ravencroft appears in Venom: Let There Be Carnage.
- Ryker's Island is a counterpart of the real-world Rikers Island, New York City's largest jail facility. In The Amazing Spider-Man (vol. 4), Ryker's Island was renamed the Cellar when it was bought and improved by Empire Unlimited.
  - Ryker's Island in other media
    - Ryker's Island appears in Spider-Man: The Animated Series.
    - Ryker's Island appears in The Spectacular Spider-Man.
    - Ryker's Island appears in the Ultimate Spider-Man episode "Return of the Sinister Six".
    - Ryker's Island appears in the Marvel Cinematic Universe (MCU) television series Daredevil and Luke Cage.
- Seagate Prison (also called "Little Alcatraz") is where the wrongly convicted Carl Lucas agreed to become a test subject for Noah Burstein. These experiments lead to him gaining super powers and changed his name to Luke Cage. The prison also appears in media set in the Marvel Cinematic Universe.
- The Vault is a defunct prison facility for super-human criminals (predominantly supervillains). It first appeared in The Avengers Annual #15 (1986) and prominently appeared in the 1990 event "Acts of Vengeance", where it was run by Truman Marsh. It was destroyed in Heroes for Hire #1 (February 1997).
  - Vault in other media
    - The Vault appears in the Iron Man episode "The Armor Wars".
    - The Vault appears in Fantastic Four.
    - The Vault appears in The Incredible Hulk: Ultimate Destruction.
    - The Vault appears in the Fantastic Four: World's Greatest Heroes episode "Strings".
    - The Vault appears in The Spectacular Spider-Man episode "Opening Night".
    - The Vault appears in The Super Hero Squad Show.
    - The Vault appears in Marvel Super Hero Squad.
    - The Vault appears in The Avengers: Earth's Mightiest Heroes. This version of the prison specializes in holding technological-based super-criminals and their technology.
    - The Vault appears in Avengers Assemble.
    - The Vault appears in Hulk and the Agents of S.M.A.S.H..
    - The Vault appears in Thunderbolts*.

==== Other locations ====
- Avengers Compound: The former headquarters of the West Coast Avengers.
- Bar with No Name: There are different Bars with No Name that appear in different locations and are often frequented by supervillains who mostly have drinks, relax, and socialize.
  - The Bar with No Name appears in the Spider-Man DLC "The City That Never Sleeps".
- Braddock Lighthouse: A lighthouse on the shores of Cornwall that connects universes. It served as the headquarters for Excalibur before its destruction.
- Braddock Lighthouse: An 18th-century manor owned by the Braddock family. It is the headquarters of Excalibur, the R.C.X and S.T.R.I.K.E, a basis for the superhero school Braddock Academy, and a Krakoan Gateway.
- Citrusville, Cypress County, Florida: It is in the Everglades and appears most frequently in stories related to Man-Thing. It is located near the Nexus of All Realities, a cross-dimensional gateway.
- Caldecott: A western Mississippi county and town where the X-Men's Rogue was born.
- Darkmoor: The location of both the Darkmoor Energy Research Centre (a high-tech, top secret government facility at which University student Brian Braddock is doing work experience) and a stone circle which was a centre of great mystical power. As the Captain Britain mythos expanded, it also played host to Darkmoor Prison and the Darkmoor Castle, home of the Black Baron.
- Fogwell's Gym: A boxing gym located in Hell's Kitchen, New York.
- The Fridge: A S.H.I.E.L.D. base and prison that appears in Agents of S.H.I.E.L.D.
- Gamma Base: Also known as Hulkbusters Base, and Desert Base. Originally a New Mexico base dedicated to Hulk's capture, it is later acquired by Operation: Zero Tolerance and S.H.I.E.L.D.
- Grand Nixon Island: An island owned by disgraced ex-general General Kreigkopf.
- Graymalkin Industries: The undercover name for the X-Men's new headquarters in San Francisco following their departure from the X-Mansion, which was destroyed in "Messiah Complex".
- HUB: S.H.I.E.L.D's main headquarters in Agents of S.H.I.E.L.D. The HUB was once taken over by Hydra. S.H.I.E.L.D retook the HUB with Phil Coulson's team.
- Hydro-Base: A floating seacraft disguised as a natural island floating off the coast of North America outside territorial waters.
- The Massachusetts Academy: A prep school founded in the 18th century in Snow Valley, in the Berkshire Mountains of Massachusetts. It is administered by Emma Frost, who trained the Hellions, and later Generation X.
- Omnipotence City: A meeting place for gods of different pantheons. It was established billions of years ago after a war between the gods.
- Red Room: A Soviet training facility that was created to produce highly specialized spies, including Black Widows Natalia Romanova and Yelena Belova. In some stories, the Red Room's agents are given biochemical enhancements and implanted with false memories. The Red Room appears prominently in the Marvel Cinematic Universe series Agent Carter and the film Black Widow.
- Salem Center: A hamlet in the town of North Salem, Westchester County, New York. The X-Mansion, the base of the X-Men, is located in Salem Center.
- St. Mabyn's Hospital: Also known as Saint Mabyn's Psychiatric Sanitarium, it is a medical facility located in London, England.
- Valhalla Villas: A retirement home in Florida where the heroes and villains of the Golden Age reside. It is owned by Mary Morgan.

=== Outer space ===
==== Planets ====
- Battleworld: An assortment of patchwork planets.
- Chandilar: The throneworld of the Shi'ar empire.
- Counter-Earth: There have been four versions of the hypothetical planet Counter-Earth, each a near-duplicate of Earth. It is featured in Guardians of the Galaxy Vol. 3 and Spider-Man Unlimited.
  - High Evolutionary's Counter-Earth: The first Counter-Earth was created by the High Evolutionary using the Infinity Gems as part of his "Project Alpha". The High Evolutionary artificially creates a Counter-Earth specifically located to hide it from "True Earth"; on his planet he has greatly accelerated evolution and the passage of time. Due to a lack of superheroes, the High Evolutionary enlisted Adam Warlock to keep peace.
  - Goddess's Counter-Earth: The second Counter-Earth, dubbed "Paradise Omega", was created by the Goddess using the Cosmic Egg, a collection of Cosmic Cubes.
  - Franklin Richards's Counter-Earth: The third Counter-Earth was created by Franklin Richards during the Heroes Reborn event. On Counter-Earth, the heroes relived altered versions of their pasts, unaware of their previous lives in the "mainstream" Marvel Universe, where they were presumed dead.
  - Onslaught Reborn Counter-Earth: The fourth Counter-Earth was also created by Franklin Richards after the events of House of M unexpectedly resurrected Onslaught, who resumed his mission to gain Franklin's powers. To elude Onslaught, Franklin transported himself, the Fantastic Four, and several of the Avengers to a reality resembling the circumstances of Heroes Reborn, where the heroes had no memory of their Earth-616 lives.
- Ego the Living Planet: A sentient planet. It is featured in Guardians of the Galaxy Vol. 2.
- Hala: The home world of the Kree. Hala is located in the Pama system in the Large Magellanic Cloud. Hala is featured in the MCU films Guardians of the Galaxy Vol. 2, Captain Marvel and The Marvels.
- Halfworld: Rocket Raccoon's homeworld in the Keystone Quadrant. It originated as an insane asylum run by robots, who created artificially-engineered humanoid animals called Halfworlders to take care of the patients.
- Klyntar: An artificial world named after the symbiote word for "cage", also known informally as the Planet of the Symbiotes.
- Sakaar: A planet in the Tayo star system that was the setting of the "Planet Hulk" storyline. Sakaar was featured in Thor: Ragnarok and other projects set in the MCU.
- Skrullos: The homeworld of the Skrulls.
- Vormir: A planet that is home to the Vorms, reptilian, energy-draining creatures that can fly through space. The planet is part of the Kree Empire. It was created for and featured in Avengers: Infinity War and Avengers: Endgame.
- Xandar: The home world of the Nova Corps, Firelord, Air-Walker and Supernova. It is featured in the MCU projects Guardians of the Galaxy and Guardians of the Galaxy Vol. 2, and was "decimated" by Thanos in Avengers: Infinity War.
- Zenn-La: A planet that is the home world of Silver Surfer and the Zenn-Lavians.

==== Satellites and planetoids ====
- Blue Area of the Moon: An artificial, self-sustaining, Earth-like environment on the Moon that was created one million years ago as part of a competition between the Kree and the Cotati.
- Birj: The sixth moon of Marman and the home of Terrax.
- Titan: The main moon of Saturn and the home of the Titan Eternals. It is featured in the MCU films Avengers: Infinity War and Avengers: Endgame as a ruined planet and former home of Thanos.

==== Space stations ====
- Avalon: One segment of the pre-existing station from the future known as Graymalkin belonged to Cable and was destroyed when S.H.I.E.L.D. attempted to seize it.
- Asteroid M: The secret base of Magneto. The original destroyed base was repurposed into the floating island Utopia, a floating island off the coast of San Francisco which became home to the remaining mutant population.
- Starcore: An orbiting laboratory satellite space station, which first appeared in The Incredible Hulk (vol. 2) #148 (February 1972).
- Taa II: A space station of Galactus.

==== Outer space prisons ====
The following prisons are located in outer space:

- Anvil is a penal colony on the planet Annoval XIV.
- The Kyln were a series of artificial moons at the edge of known space, which served both as a superhuman prison and a source of nearly unlimited power. Operations at the Kyln were overseen by the Nova Corps. All life on the Kyln moons was extinguished in Annihilation Prologue #1.
  - Kyln in other media
    - The Kyln appears in Guardians of the Galaxy as a Nova Corps prison that is destroyed by Ronan the Accuser's forces.
- Negative Zone Prison Alpha is a prison located in the Negative Zone, introduced in Civil War. It was designed by Reed Richards and built by him and Stark Industries. The prison also appears in The Avengers: Earth's Mightiest Heroes.
- The Stockade is a 31st-century prison planet appearing in Guardians of the Galaxy.

=== Extradimensional places ===
- Agamotto's dimension: The home of Agamotto.
- Ankh Dimension: A mystic realm with an Earth-like environment. It was later revealed to have been created by In-Betweener.
- Archipelago of Anguish and Redemption: The Archipelago of Anguish and Redemption, also called the Splinter Realms, is a collection of dimensions.
  - Boreas: An icy dimension where the demon Ikthalon comes from. It is also known as the Boreas Dimension.
  - Cloudsea: A dimension of floating landmasses that have been described as either being among the Inner Planes that are close to Earth or within the Archipelago of Anguish and Redemption.
  - Dark Dimension: A dimension to which Dormammu and Umar were banished by the Faltine. It was inhabited by sorcerers known as the Mhuruuks. This was the fragment of the original Dark Dimension.
  - Dream Dimension: A dream world that is one of the Splinter Realms.
    - Dreamtime: Dreamtime is the collective unconsciousness of all sentient life in the universe. It is at the border of the Dream Dimension. Furthermore, Dreamtime is home to Aboriginal gods, the Skrull gods, and Nightmare.
    - Nightmare World: A realm in the Dream Dimension that Nightmare rules.
  - Farallah: A dimension that is named after Farallah.
  - Kingdom of Tazza: A dimension ruled by Tazza and is also called Rodann.
  - Krakkan: A dimension named after its ruler Krakkan and is also called the Realm of Krakkan.
  - Mephisto's Realm: A dimension ruled by Mephisto. Blackheart and Lilith have also resided in Mephisto's realm.
  - Otherplace: Also called Limbo and the Demonic Limbo, it is home to demons of various sizes, strengths, and intellects. Home of N'astirh, S'ym and formerly ruled by Belasco before being replaced by Illyana Rasputin.
  - Realm of Madness: A dimension that is adjacent to the Nightmare World, but is beyond it and the Dream Dimension. The greatest fears of anyone take on a tangible form in the Realm of Madness.
  - Sominus: A mystic extra-dimensional realm that is a "dark reflection" of Therea and is ruled by Thog.
  - Veils of Valtorr: A gloomy dimension of decay and vapor that was formerly ruled by the smoke entity Valtorr. It was previously called the Dimension of Valtorr and was adjacent to the Boreas Dimension, Cloudsea, and Watoomb.
  - Watoomb: A dimension that is ruled by Watoomb and is also known as the Dimension of Watoomb and the Plane of Watoomb. It is linked to the Boreas Dimension.
- Astral Plane: A dimension where all matter is composed of ectoplasma.
- Avalon: Also known as Otherworld. Home of Merlyn, Roma, and the Captain Britain Corps; and location of Camelot, the Green Chapel, and the Starlight Citadel. Based on the mythical Avalon.
- Beyond-Realm: A realm where the Beyonder lives.
- Below Place: The bottom layer of reality that is also the "lowest Hell". The One Below All resides in the Below Place.
- Blackworld: An Earth-like dimension. Its historical developments took hours compared to the centuries on Earth.
- Brimstone dimension: An alternate dimension located in a dimensional rift. Nightcrawler travels through the Brimstone dimension while teleporting.
- Crimson Cosmos: A dimension where Cyttorak lives.
- Darkforce Dimension: A dimension containing the Darkforce, a powerful energy that can be manipulated in slightly different ways by a handful of beings who are attuned to it such as Darkstar and Cloak.
- Dimension Z: There are two separate dimensions named Dimension Z.
  - Arnim Zola's Dimension Z: A dimension with a desert-like terrain created by Arnim Zola that is filled with mutates and technological advances. Time and space runs faster in Dimension Z.
  - Living Eraser's Dimension Z: A dimension inhabited by green-skinned humanoids and Living Erasers.
- Djalia: A transcended plane that represented Wakanda's collective memories.
- Eighteenth Dimension: A dimension where Magister Miracle was the Sorcerer Supreme until he was killed by the Empirikul.
- Everinnye: A dimension where the Fear Lords operate.
- Exo-Space: Also known as the Neutral Zone, the Exo-Space is a location filled with positive and negative matter discovered by Blue Marvel.
- Hanan Pacha: A pocket dimension adjacent to Earth that is inhabited by the Apu. Its entrance is located near Lake Titicaca.
  - Uku Pacha: The Incan underworld.
- Heaven: An afterlife reality for good souls.
- Heliopolis: Also known as Overvoid or Othervoid, a celestial city in a dimension adjacent to Earth's, founded by the Heliopolitans. Heliopolis is built upon a small planetary object resembling Asgard, and its passage to earth is a golden bridge called the Path of the Gods.
  - Duat: The Egyptian underworld.
- Hell: An afterlife reality filled with evil souls and demons.
- Inner Planes: A group of dimensions that are tied closely to Earth.
  - Ama: A pocket dimension adjacent to Earth that is home to the Amatsu-Kami.
    - Yomi: The Japanese underworld.
  - Asgard: An other-dimensional planetoid that is the home of the Norse gods. It is featured in the MCU films Thor, Thor: The Dark World, and Thor: Ragnarok.
  - Badlands: A dimension that resembles the American Southwest prior to colonization. The Demon Bear lives in the Badlands.
  - Crossroads: A realm where Doctor Strange once banished Hulk, and which leads to countless doors that opens to worlds in other dimensions.
  - Dilmun: A dimension where the Annunaki live.
  - Nirvana: A pocket dimension adjacent to Earth that is inhabited by the Daevas.
  - Olympus: The other-dimensional home planetoid of superhuman beings analogous to the Greek gods.
    - Hades: The Greek underworld, ruled by Pluto.
      - Elysium: An area in Hades where heroic souls reside.
      - Erebus: The entrance to Hades. Those who feel that they have unfinished business in life gamble at the casino there for their resurrection.
      - Land Within: A region of Hades where a group of sorcerers banished the Cat People.
      - Tartarus: An area in Hades where the Titans and evil souls were imprisoned.
  - Ta-Lo: Created in Thor #301 (1980) by writers Mark Gruenwald and Ralph Macchio, and artist Keith Pollard. Ta-Lo is a pocket dimension adjacent to Earth that is home to the Xian race. Ta-Lo is inhabited by Chinese mythological creatures, such as dragons, fenghuang, shishi, hundun, jiuweihu, and qilin. Jiang Li, the mother of Shang-Chi, was a member of one of Ta-Lo's few mortal communities known as Qilin Riders.
  - Topán: A pocket dimension adjacent to Earth that is home to the Teteoh.
  - Upperworld: A pocket dimension adjacent to Earth that is home to the Ahau.
- Kaluwalhatian: A pocket dimension adjacent to Earth that is inhabited by the Diwatas.
- Kosmos: A dimension that is the home of the Kosmosians and Growing Man. This dimension can be tapped into by Pym Particles which are like pollen on Kosmos.
- Land of Couldn't-Be Shouldn't-Be: A dimension created by the romantic relationship of Eternity and the Queen of Nevers. Glorian and the Shaper of Worlds live in the Land of Couldn't-Be Shouldn't-Be.
- Limbo: Associated with Immortus and Rom the Spaceknight, not to be confused with Otherplace.
- Liveworld: A dimension ruled by Dreamqueen.
- Lower Aether: A dimension where Zelatrix Lavey was the Sorcerer Supreme until she was killed by the Empirikul.
- Microverse: Any universe that is only accessible through vibrational attunement (shrinking). Bug, Psycho-Man, and Jarella, among others, originate from the Microverse. In the Marvel Cinematic Universe, the Microverse is referred to as the Quantum Realm.
  - K'ai: K'ai is a world within the Microverse inhabited by green-skinned humanoids. It was brought into the normal universe by Hiro-Kala.
  - Kaliklak: Kaliklak is a world within the Microverse. It is inhabited by various insect-like species and is the homeworld of Micronaut member Bug.
  - Mita: Mita is a world within the Microverse and is the home of the Mitans. It was destroyed when Togaro sent Mita into the sun. Although most of the Mitans were evacuated, some of them were killed when their ship crashed on another planet.
  - Spartak: Spartak is an inhospitable rocky world within the Microverse. It is home to the Acroyears. Spartak was destroyed when Prince Acroyear used Spartak's Worldmind to destroy Baron Karza. The surviving Acroyears became galactic nomads.
  - Sub-Atomica: A micro star system that was later merged into the Microverse.
    - Traan: A planet where Psycho-Man comes from.
- Mojoverse: A dimension inhabited by spineless aliens. Mojo, Mojo II, Spiral, Longshot, Major Domo, Madame Mondo, and the X-Babies originate from the Mojoverse and reside on Mojo World.
  - Mojo World: The only planet in the Mojoverse.
- Narcisson: A dimension ruled by the Dark Gods.
- Negative Zone: The Negative Zone is a universe parallel to Earth's, appearing most frequently in Fantastic Four. Created by Stan Lee and Jack Kirby, it first appeared in Fantastic Four #51 (June 1966). While the universes are similar in many respects they are different in that: all matter in the Negative Zone is negatively charged, and has also been interpreted as being antimatter. Since the Negative Zone is largely uninhabited, several would-be conquerors have attempted to bridge the gap to Earth and take over its population. Notable residents of the Negative Zone include Blastaar and Annihilus. The Negative Zone was also used as the location for a prison for superheroes refusing to register in the events of the Civil War storyline by Tony Stark and his allies. Mark D. White saw in its depiction "a direct analog to the prison in our real-world Guantanmo Bay".
  - Negative Zone in other media
    - The Negative Zone appears in the Fantastic Four episode "Behold the Negative Zone".
    - The Negative Zone appears in Fantastic Four: World's Greatest Heroes. This version is inhabited by various serpentine and insectoid creatures.
    - The Negative Zone appears in the Iron Man: Armored Adventures episode "The Makluan Invasion".
    - The Negative Zone appears in The Avengers: Earth's Mightiest Heroes.
    - The Negative Zone appears in Hulk and the Agents of S.M.A.S.H..
    - The Negative Zone appears in Marvel: Ultimate Alliance 2.
    - The Negative Zone appears in Marvel Super Hero Squad: The Infinity Gauntlet.
    - The Negative Zone appears in Marvel Cosmic Invasion.
- Null-Time Zone: A dimension that exists outside of time and is used by the Time Variance Authority.
- Orun: A pocket dimension adjacent to Earth that is home to the Vodu.
- Punch dimension: A dimension of "pure, endless concussive force" that America Chavez used to kill a Chitauri Leviathan. Cyclops is also sometimes depicted as drawing power from the dimension.
- Purple dimension: A pocket dimension ruled by the tyrannical Agamonn.
- Quidlivun: A pocket dimension adjacent to Earth that is inhabited by the Inua.
- Realm of Death: This is where Death resides.
- R'Vaal: An other-dimensional planet and the home of Rintrah.
- Sixth Dimension: A dimension that is the home of its Sorcerer Supreme Tiboro.
- Soul World: A dimension that exists within the Soul Gem.
- Svarga: A pocket dimension adjacent to Earth that is home to the Dievas.
- Taivas: A pocket dimension adjacent to Earth that is home to the Jumala.
- Therea: A mystic extra-dimensional realm where two benevolent gods dwell who appear in the form of dogs to human eyes. It is an Earth-like land of peace and tranquility and has a "dark reflection" in Sominus. Therea is ruled by twin gods, Zokk and Maftra. Zokk and Maftra are worshipped by the barbarian Korrek and his people, and even revered by Dakimh the Enchanter.
- Thirteenth Dimension: A dimension where Szandor Sozo was the Sorcerer Supreme until Empirikul's Witchfinder Wolves caught up to him when he fled and was "purified" by holy acid.
- Twelfth Dimension: A shadow realm whose creatures like Shadow Goblins and Magma Serpents are invisible to the eyes of those not of the Twelfth Dimension.
- Underspace: A plane of reality below the Microverse. This is where Hank Pym placed the Infinite Avengers Mansion.
- White Hot Room: A quasi-mystical place that holds the essences of Phoenix Force hosts.
- Witches' Road: A mystical dimension accessible only to certain magic users and those they summon.
- Zephyrland: An underwater dimension. Virago took over the city until she was defeated by Namor and Doctor Strange.

== Organizations ==
=== Government agencies ===
- Aladdin: In the Ultraverse setting, Aladdin was a U.S. government agency apparently founded sometime in the 1960s to deal with the growing number of Ultras (super-powered beings) in their world. In 1970, their scientific division, using a synthesis of organic brain tissue and computer systems called G.E.N.I.E. (Genetically Engineered Neural Intelligence Experiment), was examining alien technology and corpses discovered by U.S. soldiers during the Vietnam War, when some unknown event caused the corpses to release a cloud of material which caused G.E.N.I.E. to develop sentience and grow into a true fusion of organic and mechanical technology.
- Aladdin Assault Squad: In the Malibu Ultraverse, the Aladdin Assault Squad/A.A.S. was a special department within the government agency known as Aladdin. The Aladdin Assault Squad was created in response to the growing number of Ultras (superhumans). The A.A.S. operated out of Aladdin's Groom Lake facility, and functioned as an independent internal security force. They also assisted ongoing Ultra research. Known members of the Aladdin Assault Squad are: Dirt Devil, Foxfire, the Grip, Hardwire, Headknocker, and War Eagle.
- A.R.M.O.R.
- Black Air
- The Commission on Superhuman Activities (also known as the Commission on Superhuman Affairs or CSA for short): A government agency that monitors superhumans. They have an office in Washington, D.C. A number of members of the Commission when created were involved with various government projects regarding superhumans: Project Wideawake, former and current Avengers liaisons, Freedom Force liaison and super soldier projects such as Head Commissioner Douglas Rockwell, Norman Osborn, Abner Jenkins, Valerie Cooper, and Henry Peter Gyrich.
- Department H: A branch of Canada's Department of National Defence that deals with super-powered persons. Department H manages Alpha Flight and its related teams Beta Flight, Gamma Flight, and Omega Flight.
- Department K: A Canadian government group which secretly operated the Weapon X project.
- Euromind: Another European subdivision of S.H.I.E.L.D., was introduced in the Marvel Italia series Europa.
- F.I.6: A British Intelligence agency, and former employers of Micromax. It disbanded after most of its agents, including Blott, were killed by Necrom.
- G.R.A.M.P.A.: G.R.A.M.P.A., the Global Reaction Agency for Mysterious Paranormal Activity, debuted in Amazing Fantasy (vol. 2) #15. G.R.A.M.P.A.'s most prominent field operatives are Ace and One-Eyed Jacquie; the two agents refer to themselves collectively as "Blackjack". G.R.A.M.P.A. is tasked with protecting the world from paranormal threats.
- H.A.M.M.E.R.
- H.A.T.E.: The Highest Anti-Terrorism Effort is one of two antagonistic organizations in Nextwave: Agents of H.A.T.E. H.A.T.E. and its leader, Dirk Anger, are parodies of Marvel's S.H.I.E.L.D. and Nick Fury. H.A.T.E. is a government agency that is funded by the Beyond Corporation.
- The Lodge: Created by Basil Wentworth towards the end of World War II, the Lodge was intended to prepare for the Cold War. The Lodge started covert operations in China, the Soviet Union, and East Germany, and has continued its "dirty tricks" into the present day.
- MI-13
- Mutant Response Division: A mutant-hunting group founded by Steven Lang and Bolivar Trask and funded by Bastion. Similar groups are introduced in the X-Men films, including the Department of Mutant Containment (DMC) and the Mutant Containment Unit (MCU).
- Office of National Emergency: Commonly referred to as O*N*E or Sentinel Squad O*N*E, the Office of National Emergency is a government agency intended to act in the absence of superheroes. It is known as the originator of the Sentinel squads that were assigned to protect/observe the X-Men and the remaining mutants following M-Day.
- O.X.E. is a company founded by a Life Model Decoy of Valentina Allegra de Fontaine. They first appeared in Thunderbolts vol. 6 #1 (December 2023).
- Project Wideawake: A government program under Henry Peter Gyrich with the purpose of detecting and capturing mutants, which employs the robots known as Sentinels.
- R.C.X.: The Resources Control Executive is a British intelligence agency, introduced in Captain Britain as a replacement to S.T.R.I.K.E. and created by Jamie Delano and Alan Davis. The members of R.C.X. use codenames based on biblical figures to hide their true identity.
- S.A.F.E.: Introduced in Marvel's line of novels in the mid-1990s, S.A.F.E. (Strategic Action For Emergencies) is the United States' answer to S.H.I.E.L.D. They first appeared in Spider-Man & the Incredible Hulk: Rampage (Doom's Day Book 1), and may not be part of the mainline continuity. Whereas S.H.I.E.L.D. is a UN-funded and run organization dealing with international incidents, S.A.F.E. is tasked with similar duties inside of America's borders. It is run by Colonel Sean Morgan and a prominently featured agent is Joshua Ballard, who, among other things, survived an encounter with Doctor Doom and later Baron Zemo.
- S.H.I.E.L.D.: Strategic Hazard Intervention Enforcement Logistics Division is the United States' top spy agency led by Nick Fury.
- S.T.A.R.S.: The Commission on Superhuman Activities, created a special division of the federal government's U.S. Marshals called S.T.A.R.S., the Superhuman Tactical Activities Response Squad. A federal organization authorized to monitor and manage all activities regarding the supervision, apprehension, and detention of superhuman criminals in the United States. The group's leader was John Walker, the U.S. Agent. S.T.A.R.S. uncovered a Ruul plot to use Earth as a penal colony for alien criminals. U.S. Agent and S.T.A.R.S. were ultimately responsible for exposing and defeating the Ruul.
- S.T.A.K.E.: Special Threat Assessment for Known Extranormalities. was a S.H.I.E.L.D. project inspired by Dum Dum Dugan's Howling Commandos, which focused on dealing with supernatural occurrences. When Hydra takes over S.H.I.E.L.D. in "Secret Empire", the Howling Commandos and S.T.A.K.E. fall under their control.
- S.T.R.I.K.E.
- Superhuman Restraint Unit
- S.W.O.R.D.: Sentient World Observation And Response Department is an agency that deals with cosmic threats to Earth.
- W.A.N.D.: Wizardry Alchemy Necromancy Department, the magical division of S.H.I.E.L.D. aided by Wong and Director Pandora Peters introduced in the Marvel NOW! relaunch of Thunderbolts.
- Weapon X
- W.H.O.: The Weird Happenings Organization was mandated by the UK government with the investigation into and research of supernatural and paranormal phenomena until it was replaced by Black Air. It was featured in Excalibur.

=== Criminal organizations ===
- Advanced Idea Mechanics: A conglomeration of scientists dedicated to acquiring power and overthrowing all governments by technological means. A.I.M. was originally founded by Baron Strucker to develop advanced weaponry for Hydra.
- Beyond Corporation: A company run by rogue Beyonders. The Beyond Corporation once posed as a high-tech terrorist cell known as S.I.L.E.N.T., yet did not abandon their ulterior motive—the location, activation, distribution, and testing of various weapons of mass destruction. The Beyond Corporation became the sponsor of Ben Reilly in the Beyond storyline, manipulating his memories and causing him to suffer a mental breakdown.
- Black Spectre: The villain Mandrill created Black Spectre by organizing his female followers, who disguised themselves as men using bulky armor. Beechman planned to use Black Spectre to confuse America through terrorism and racism, instilling chaos in the world and intending to rule it after anarchy ensued.
- Brotherhood of Mutants: The Brotherhood of Mutants, originally known as the Brotherhood of Evil Mutants and briefly as Freedom Force and the Brotherhood, is a Marvel Comics supervillain team devoted to mutant superiority over normal humans. They are adversaries of the X-Men. The original Brotherhood was created by Stan Lee and Jack Kirby and first appeared in The X-Men #4 (March 1964).
- Friends of Humanity: The Friends of Humanity is anti-mutant hate group founded by Graydon Creed. Groups inspired by or splintered from the Friends of Humanity include the survivalist Humanity's Last Stand and the religious fundamentalist Church of Humanity.
- Gene Nation: On the anniversary of the Mutant Massacre, in which the Marauders killed many Morlocks, the members of the terrorist group Gene Nation reappeared in the main universe (Earth-616). Their mission was to destroy one human for every Morlock who died.
- The Gnucci Crime Family is an Italian-American criminal organization based in New York City. It was created by Garth Ennis and Steve Dillon, and first appeared in The Punisher vol. 5 #1 (February 2000).
- The Hand: The Hand is a cult of evil, mystical ninjas who are heavily involved in organized crime and mercenary activities such as assassination plots. The Hand covets power above all other objectives. They are primarily based in Japan, but operate internationally. They were founded in the 16th century, and soon became servants of the demon Krahllak, who is known as the Beast of the Hand.
- Hellfire Club: Although the club appears to merely be an international social club for wealthy elites, its Inner Circle consists of mutants who try to influence world events for the accumulation of power. The club is based on the Hellfire Club, an 18th-century British secret society.
- Humanity's Last Stand: A radical anti-mutant hate group and enemies of the X-Men. In the group's first appearance they were behind the creation of a false Mutant Liberation Front, formed by human members of H.L.S. posing as mutants through the use of mutagenic drugs or technologically enhanced suits, to mimic mutant powers.
- Hydra: A terrorist organization that first appeared in Strange Tales #135. In its original continuity, it was headed by nondescript businessman Arnold Brown, who was killed by S.H.I.E.L.D. It soon returned, however, headed by Baron Strucker, under the aegis of the Nazi Red Skull; Hydra's changing origin was one of the earliest Marvel retcons. After its initial defeat, several of its branches surfaced, appearing to be unrelated and independent. Hydra's scientific branch was initially Advanced Idea Mechanics, which later split off into its own organization. Other factions included THEM (the ruling council of Hydra) and the Secret Empire (which, like A.I.M., also split off into its own organization).
- Maggia: An international crime syndicate, somewhat similar to the Mafia, but differing in that they frequently hire supervillains and mad scientists to work for them. Count Nefaria and his daughter Madame Masque have both been leaders of an important Maggia family.
- Maelstrom's Minions: A trio of supervillains who work for Maelstrom. They consist of Gronk, Helio, and Phobius.
- Mys-Tech: The board of Mys-Tech, a multinational corporation, were originally seven mages who sold their souls to Mephisto in exchange for immortality. The Mys-Tech board members must provide a steady stream of souls to the demon, otherwise they will breach their contract and forfeit their souls. Over the years, the board accumulates power and wealth and becomes a business empire.
- National Force: The National Force is a neo-fascist organization founded by Doctor Faustus. Faustus had captured William Burnside, the fourth Captain America, and his partner Jack Monroe, both heroes from the 1950s, frozen in suspended animation. Faustus took control of Burnside in an attempt to use him against Captain America and later turned him into the Grand Director.
- Purifiers: A paramilitary group of Christian terrorists led by William Stryker, also known as the "Stryker Crusade". The group debuted in the graphic novel X-Men: God Loves, Man Kills. The Purifiers see themselves in a holy war against mutants, believing them to be the children of the devil and thus deserving of extermination.
- Secret Empire: The subversive organization known as the Secret Empire has followed a number of different leaders, always known as "Number One". The Secret Empire began as a subsidiary of Hydra, which provided it with financial support. The Secret Empire served to distract the attention of authorities such as S.H.I.E.L.D. from Hydra's activities, although the original Number One sought to break away from Hydra.
- Serpent Society: An organization of snake-themed terrorists initially formed from the membership of two previous supervillain teams, both called the Serpent Squad.
- Sons of the Serpent: A subversive organization of costumed American racist super-patriots who oppose all racial, ethnic, and religious minorities. They sought to subvert America through hate crimes and organized protests, and were opposed by the Avengers and the Defenders.
- THEM: THEM, through its founder Baron Strucker, is the managing power of a supraorganization which includes Hydra, A.I.M., and the Secret Empire. THEM was founded by Nazi war criminal Baron Strucker after World War II. Later Strucker appointed a businessman named Arnold Brown to the position of Supreme Hydra; Hydra's highly visible operations served as a front for THEM.
- U.L.T.I.M.A.T.U.M.: The Underground Liberated Totally Integrated Mobile Army To Unite Mankind is a terrorist organization founded by Flag-Smasher in his attempts to destroy nationalism. They have numerous battles with Deadpool, during which he kills all of its members.
- Universal Church of Truth: A star-spanning religious empire headed by the Magus, and enemies of the Guardians of the Galaxy. A different version of the Universal Church led by Cardinal Raker was introduced in the second volume of Guardians of the Galaxy. The group was renamed the Universal Believers in the Guardians of the Galaxy animated series and served as central villains in the 2021 Guardians of the Galaxy video game.
- Zodiac: The original Zodiac group debuted in the title Avengers and is established as a criminal organization founded and funded by member Cornelius Van Lunt (who adopts the identity of Taurus). The group's identity is based on the zodiac from the discipline astrology, with each member adopting the persona of a sign of the zodiac, being 12 in all. The group members share leadership of the organization, with the position rotating just as the astrological zodiac changes.

=== Alien races ===
- Badoon – Reptilian aliens who live under strict gender segregation.
- Brood – Insect-like, parasitic, aliens.
- Chitauri – Reptilian cyborg warriors.
- Cotati – Intelligent, telepathic, plant-like aliens.
- Kree – A blue-skinned alien race.
- Phalanx – A cybernetic species with a telepathic hive mind connection.
- Skrulls – Green-skinned shape-shifting aliens.
- Shi'ar – Humanoid aliens with bird-like attributes.
- Symbiotes – Amorphous, shape-shifting alien symbiotes.
- Watchers – A species who are committed to observing and compiling knowledge on all aspects of the universe, and vowed to never interfere with other civilizations.

=== Hidden races ===
The Earth of Marvel's main continuity (or "Earth-616") has contained a number of fictional hidden native humanoid races. Many of these races are genetic offshoots of Homo sapiens or a related ancestor. However, there are also some races that were actually created from the many animals or other lifeforms on Earth. The methods to create these beings vary from scientific to magical and their creators from aliens to humans to demons.

A list of these races includes:

- The Bird-Men of Akah Ma'at are avian humanoids from the Hyborian Age. They were created by Oshtur.
- The Cat People are humanoid cats. There are two different versions of them:
  - One group of Cat People was created by magic and are apparently now extinct on Earth. The race had a hand in the origin of Tigra.
  - A similar but unconnected alien race of Cat People from the Land Within encountered Morbius the Living Vampire.
- The Children of the Sun are humanoid beings created by Ex Nihilo.
- The Children of the Vault are a group of superhuman beings that evolved from baseline humanity and separated from the Mutants.
- The Chordai are humanoid eels who claim to be connected with the "Old Kings of Atlantis".
- The Descendants are humanoid cybernetic sapient beings created by science and the magic of the Orb of Necromancy.
- The Deviants are enemies of the Eternals and creations of the Celestials. They are the creators of the Subterraneans.
- The Eternals are enemies of the Deviants and servants of the Celestials. They also created the Evolutionaries.
- The Evolutionaries are beings created from the Ape-Men by the Eternals to safeguard other species' evolutionary path.
- The Fish People are an offshoot of humanity that live and breathe underwater.
- Homo mermanus is a species of aquatic humanoids of unknown origins. There are two versions of Homo mermanus:
  - The Atlanteans are a branch of Homo mermanus that resides in Atlantis. Namor, Andromeda, Attuma, Byrrah, Lady Dorma, Namora, Namorita, Orka, Tyrak, U-Man, Krang, Vashti Cleito-Son, and the members of both the Fathom Five and the School are known Atlanteans.
  - The Lemurians are a branch of Homo mermanus who reside in Lemuria and have green skin. Llyra, Llyron, and Naga are known Lemurians.
- The Infra-Worlders are humans that "evolved" to live and withstand the pressure beneath the ocean.
- The Inhumans are an altered superhuman race created by the Kree as a way to restart their own evolution and to create weapons against the Skrulls.
  - The Alpha Primitives are a slave race created from humans by the Inhumans using the Xerogen Crystals' gas.
  - The Bird-People are a winged genetic offshoot of the Inhumans.
- The Mala are undersea humanoids with crab-like features that claimed that they were connected with the "Old Kings of Atlantis".
- The Man-Bats of Ur-Xanarrh are bat-like humanoids created by Chthon. They are enemies of Akah Ma'At.
- The Man-Serpents are beings with serpent bodies and human heads created by the demon Set. They are related to the Serpent Men, who have the opposite appearance.
- The Mutants are a subspecies of human born with the "X-gene", which grants them innate superhuman abilities or alterations. They are sometimes called Homo superior.
  - The Changelings are a sub-class of mutants that possess their powers since birth.
  - The Chimeras are genetically altered humanoid mutants created from the combined DNA of other mutants.
  - The Cheyarafim are a group of angel-like mutants and enemies of the Neyaphem.
  - The Externals are a group of immortal mutants with god-like powers.
  - The Lupine are a possible subspecies of mutants that evolved from canines; also known as the "Dominant Species." Some of them have been mistaken for werewolves.
  - The Morlocks are a group of mutants who live underground due to being unable to blend in with society.
  - The Neo are a subspecies of mutants with superior power and physical abilities. They debuted in X-Men vol. 2 #100 (May 2000), created by Chris Claremont and Leinil Francis Yu.
  - The Neyaphem are demon-like mutants and enemies of the Cheyarafim.
- The New Men are anthropomorphic animals created by the High Evolutionary.
- The Outcasts are the names of two unrelated groups:
  - The Subterranean Outcasts are groups of beings who were given powers by the Mole Man.
  - A different group of Outcasts are desert animals and plants who were mutated by gamma radiation.
- The Sasquatches are a legendary race also known as Bigfoots.
- The Saur-Lords are genetically altered dinosaurs created by the High Technician.
- The Savage Land Races are an assortment of races living in the Savage Land that have been sorted between the human tribes, the primitive hominids, the Beast-Men, and the miscellaneous races that are not in the categories of the former three.
- The Seal People are humanoid seals and enemies of Atlantis.
- The Serpent Men are humanoid reptilians created by the demon Set. They are related to the Man-Serpents, who have the opposite appearance.
- The Shark Men are humanoid sharks that live in the oceans, once ancient aquatic people who were transformed by the Old Ones.
- The Spider-People are humanoid beings with spider-like characteristics. They are the children of Omm and the grandchildren of Gaea.
- The Stygians are a southern race of rock giants, monsters, sorcerers, and dark sorcerers from Hyboria.
- The Subterraneans are creatures that live in Subterranea.
  - The Deviant Mutates are mutated or deformed members of the Deviants.
  - The Ghouls are a Subterranean race of unknown origins.
  - The Gortokians are Subterraneans.
  - The Lava Men are lava-skinned beings that live in Subterranea.
  - The Lizard Men are humanoid lizards that live in Subterranea.
  - The Molans are Subterraneans created by the Deviants.
  - The Moloids are Subterraneans created by the Deviants that are often seen working for the Mole Man.
  - The Netherworlders are humans from the Netherworld, a city beneath the earth somewhere in Subterranea with ties to Atlantis and Lemuria.
  - The Tyrannoids are an offshoot of the Moloids that are often seen working for Tyrannus.
- The Troglodytes of Britain are a group of underground dwellers that are apparently an evolutionary throwback.
- The Uhari are piscine humanoids that claimed that they were connected with the "Old Kings of Atlantis".
- The Vampires are bloodsucking entities with many types and origins. Dracula, Baron Blood, Lilith, and Varnae are known vampires. There have also been pseudo-vampires like Morbius and dhampirs like Blade.
  - The Adze are African vampires.
  - The Anchorite Sect are American vampires who have lifestyles similar to the Amish.
  - The Ancient are Italian vampires with superhero traits who are one of the first vampires.
  - The Aqueos Sect are vampire versions of the Homo mermanus, the Faceless Ones, and marine life.
  - The Charniputra Sect are gargoyle-like vampires who live in the Himalayas.
  - The Claw Sect are Western European vampires.
  - The Ekimmu are ghostly vampires.
  - The Jumlin are Native-American vampires.
  - The Krieger Sect are Middle-Eastern vampires.
  - The Moksha Sect are vampires who drink small amounts of blood.
  - The Mortus Invitus are vampires who feed off of vampires that target humans.
  - The Mysticos Sect are American vampires who are skilled with technology.
  - The Nosferai are Eastern European vampires who are similar to Count Orlok.
  - The Purebloods are vampires who were born vampires.
  - The Siren Sect are seductive female vampires.
  - The Tryk Sect are parasitic vampires that prefer the blood of other vampires.
  - The Yiki Onna are Japanese vampires.
- The Walrus Men are humanoid walruses.
- The Warpies are mutated and unstable beings created by Mad Jim Jaspers.
- The Werewolves are shapeshifting creatures that transform into wolf-like creatures under the full Moon, with some of them being magical in nature while others are "scientific". Werewolf by Night and Man-Wolf are known werewolves.
- The Wolf-Men of Valusia are lupine shapeshifters created by the demon Chthon. They can transform without the aid of the full Moon, which distinguishes them from traditional werewolves.
- Woodgod's Changelings are human-animal hybrids created by Woodgod using genetic engineering.
- The Yeti are humanoid beings living in the Himalaya Mountains and familiarly known as the "Abominable Snowmen."
  - The Cold People (also called the Chosen) are Yeti-like creatures who live in the Himalayas.
- The Zombies are "the living dead" with many types and origins ranging from magical to artificial. One alternate reality is home to the Marvel Zombies.

== Objects ==
=== Vehicles ===
- Atomic Steed: The Black Knight sometimes employs one of the "Atomic Steeds" built by the Knights of Wundagore, engineered by the High Evolutionary.
- Battle Van: The Battle Van was used by the Punisher as his primary mode of transportation. It is customized with a various array of weaponry and armor, and serves as a mobile armory.
- Blackbird: The X-Men's primary aircraft.
- Fantastic Four's Pogo Plane: so called because of its tail-down landing/take-off attitude, was the first significant air-breathing engine design of Reed Richards. Employing new turbine blade configurations and a new titanium-alloy process, Richards increased overall engine performance to a very high thrust-to-weight ratio. It is loosely based on the experimental Convair XFY Pogo aircraft.
- Fantasticar: The Fantasticar is the name of various flying hovercraft used by the Fantastic Four, most versions are able to split into four smaller vehicles. Created by Stan Lee and Jack Kirby, it first appeared in Fantastic Four #3 (March 1962).
- Freedom's Lady: An Annihilator-class battleship used by the original Guardians of the Galaxy.
- Goblin Glider: A bat-shaped glider that Green Goblin uses to travel around the skies.
- Hellcycle: Ghost Rider's flaming motorcycle. The vehicle is created by the Ghost Rider's hellfire being imbued in an otherwise normal motorcycle, usually the property of Ghost Rider's host at the time.
- Kang's time-ship: A ship used by Kang the Conqueror to travel through time by accessing Limbo.
- Leapfrog: A sentient vehicle created by Chase Stein's parents Janet and Victor that serves as transportation for the Runaways.
- Mooncopter: Moon Knight's copter is a VTOL vehicle capable of precision, computer-assisted maneuvering for air-land-and-sea rescues, tracking automobiles through traffic, and many other purposes. The on-board computer performs navigation functions, remote sensor image-enhancement, and radar interpretation.
- Quinjet: A technologically advanced S.H.I.E.L.D. jet used primarily by the Avengers, the Quinjet first appeared in The Avengers #61 (February 1969).
- S.H.I.E.L.D. flying car: The flying car is a S.H.I.E.L.D. personal vehicle resembles a car but can fly. It made appearances in Spider-Man and his Amazing Friends, Spider-Man: The Animated Series, and the Marvel Cinematic Universe.
- S.H.I.E.L.D. Helicarrier: The aircraft used by S.H.I.E.L.D. around the world.
- Ship: Apocalypse's gigantic, self-aware AI ship simply known as "Ship". It is hinted to have been built by the Celestials. It has served as X-Factor's base before being reconfigured into the Professor (later known as Prosh).
- Shockwave Rider: The superhero team Nextwave steals the Shockwave Rider, its base of operations, from H.A.T.E., a compromised anti-terrorist organization. The Shockwave Rider is powered by a Zero-Point Squirt Drive, giving it a nearly unlimited fuel supply. The Rider contains five tesseract zones, allowing it to be spacious on the inside while keeping it compact on the outside. To deploy in the field, the team dives through a pool of an orange membrane to exit via the underside of the ship. It was destroyed in Nextwave's final battle with the Beyond Corporation.
- Skuttlebutt: A Korbinite-designed sentient starship and the vehicle of Beta Ray Bill.
- Sky Bike: Hawkeye sometimes travels in a custom-built sky bike (also called a sky-cycle or skymobile), designed and built at Cross Technological Enterprises. It also appears in Iron Man, The Avengers: Earth's Mightiest Heroes and Avengers Assemble.

=== Weapons ===
- Absorbing Man's ball and chain
- Ant-Man's armor and helmet
- Beta Ray Bill's hammer, Stormbreaker
- Black Panther's Panther Habit armor
- Black Knight's Ebony Blade
- Black Widow's Bite stingers and gauntlets
- Blade's sword
- Captain America's shield
- Chase Stein's fistigons
- Cloak's cloak
- Colleen Wing's katana
- Cyclops's visor
- Daredevil's billy club
- Deadpool's katanas and guns
- Doctor Octopus's mechanical tentacles
- Drax's dual knives
- Elektra's sais
- Falcon's wing harness
- Gamora's Godslayer sword
- Ghost Rider's chain and hellfire shotgun
- Gorr's All-Black the Necrosword
- Green Goblin's pumpkin bombs
- Hawkeye's bow and trick arrows
- Hercules's mace
- Hulkling's Excelsior sword
- Iron Man's armor
- The Iron Spider is a fictional powered exoskeleton used by several characters in Marvel Comics. Peter Parker utilized the Iron Spider in place of his usual costume until writer J. Michael Straczynski chose to revert it to the older costume. The Iron Spider was used symbolically to show Spider-Man's divided loyalties during the "Civil War" storyline.
- Kraven the Hunter's spear
- Magik's Soulsword
- Magneto's helmet
- Misty Knight's bionic arm
- Moon Knight's crescent darts
- Mysterio's helmet
- Namor's trident
- Psylocke's katana
- Punisher's arsenal of weapons
- Quake's gauntlets
- Rocket Raccoon's arsenal of guns
- Scorpion's mechanical tail
- Shocker's gauntlets
- Spider-Man's web shooters
- Star-Lord's quad-blasters
- Taskmaster's sword and shield
- Thor's hammer Mjölnir
- Thunderstrike's mace
- Vulture's wing harness
- War Machine's armor
- Wasp's armor and helmet
- Winter Soldier's bionic arm
- Wolverine's adamantium claws

=== Artifacts ===
==== Mystical artifacts ====
- Amulets of Power: Three amulets in the possession of the White Tiger.
- Amulet of Right: An amulet offered to Captain Britain by Merlin and Roma, opposed to the Sword of Might.
- Book of the Vishanti: A grimoire of white magic associated with Doctor Strange.
- Casket of Ancient Winters: An Asgardian relic that can generate infinite cold.
- Cloak of Levitation: A potent mystical item worn by Doctor Strange that enables him to fly.
- Coronet of Enchantment: A coronet worn by Talisman, granting the wearer many magical abilities.
- Darkhold: A grimoire containing the knowledge of Chthon, the first practitioner of dark magic. It also appears in media set in the Marvel Cinematic Universe.
- Dragonfang: An enchanted sword said to be carved by the wizard Kahji-Da from a tooth of an extra-dimensional dragon wielded by Valkyrie.
- Dreamstones: A limited magical stone that turns the emotions of a person into reality, found among the Dark Elves.
- Ebony Blade: A sword that is wielded by the different incarnations of Black Knight.
- Evil Eye of Avalon: A powerful blasting device used by Prester John.
- Eye of Agamotto: An artifact that is worn by Doctor Strange.
- Mjölnir: The Hammer of Thor.
- Mark of Shou-Lao: After defeating Shou-Lao, Danny Rand acquired the power of the Iron Fist. He had the mark of the dragon burned onto his chest, which allowed him to channel chi.
- Muramasa Blade: A sword that was forged by Muramasa and has been wielded at different points by Wolverine.
- Orb of Agamotto: A globe in the possession of Doctor Strange.
- Serpent Crown: Created by the demon Set, it links the wearer to its creator, providing various physical and mental powers.
- Siege Perilous: The name of two devices, the first appearing in Captain Britain comics, and the second in X-Men comics. Both devices were created by writer Chris Claremont, who named it after the Siege Perilous, the empty chair at King Arthur's round table. The latter device, featured in X-Men, can transport individuals to new locations with rejuvenated, amnesiac bodies.
- Staff of One: A staff used by Nico Minoru. It possesses vast magical abilities, but cannot resurrect the dead or use the same spell more than once.
- Stormbreaker: The hammer of Beta Ray Bill.
- Sword of Might: A sword offered to Captain Britain, opposed to the Amulet of Right.
- Twilight Sword: The weapon of the giant Surtur.
- Wand of Watoomb: An artifact controlled by the thoughts of the wielder, and can be used to project and absorb mystical energy; create force fields; control weather; open dimensional portals; observe events in other locations and heal wounds. The Wand first appeared in The Amazing Spider-Man Annual #2 (December 1965) and was created by Stan Lee and Steve Ditko.

==== Cosmic artifacts ====
- Abundant Gems/Abundant Glove: Six "marginally powerful" gems – the Compassion, Laughter, Dance, Respect, and "another Dance Gem".
- Cosmic Cube: A group of cubes with reality-warping abilities. Several of the Cubes have gained sentience, including the Shaper of Worlds and Kobik.
- Cosmic Egg: A powerful artifact created by the Goddess from combining 30 Cosmic Cubes.
- Cosmic Regulator: Created by the One-Above-All to keep the universes from clashing into each other.
- Heart of the Universe
- Infinity Gems: Six gems that grant supreme power over aspects of existence: Mind, Power, Soul, Time, Space, and Reality.
- M'Kraan Crystal: The "nexus of realities", which connects to all other universes.
- Phoenix Egg
- Quantum Bands, used by Quasar and temporarily used by Silver Surfer to wield cosmic energy.
- Ultimate Nullifier

==== Other artifacts ====
- Cerebro: A device used by the X-Men to detect other mutants.
- Legacy Virus: A plague created to kill mutants.
- Mandarin's rings: A group of mystical rings wielded by the Mandarin.
- The Tallus: A device used by the Exiles to communicate with their leader, the Timebroker.

=== Substances ===
==== Drugs ====
- D-Lite: A synthetic heroin developed by Simon Marshall for the Maggia that gave Cloak and Dagger their powers.
- Goblin formula: The chemical formula that gave the Green Goblin his powers.
- Mutant Growth Hormone: A chemical produced by mutants and mutates that can give humans superhuman abilities.
- Growth pills: Capsules containing size-altering Pym particles that allow Giant Man, Ant-Man, and the Wasp to change their size.
- Extremis: A techno-organic virus created in an attempt to recreate the Super-Soldier Serum.
- "Kick" (Hypercortisone D): An aerosol drug derived from the sentient bacteria Sublime, capable of boosting superhuman powers and giving a high, while also increasing aggression.
- Lizard formula: The chemical formula that transforms Curt Connors into the Lizard.
- OZ Formula: A formula that gave Spider-Man, Green Goblin, and Doctor Octopus their powers in the Ultimate Marvel continuity.
- Red Skull's Dust of Death: A red powder which kills a victim within seconds of skin contact. The powder causes the skin of the victim's head to shrivel, tighten, and take on a red discoloration, while causing the hair to fall out, hence, the victim's head resembles a "red skull".
- Super Soldier Serum: An experimental military drug that enhances physical abilities and gave several superheroes their powers, most notably Captain America.
- Terrigen Mist: A mutagenic catalyst that activates Inhuman abilities.

==== Elemental substances and minerals ====
- Adamantium is an indestructible metal alloy best known for being integrated into the skeleton and claws of Wolverine. It was created during an attempt to duplicate the Vibranium–steel alloy of Captain America's shield.
- Carbonadium is a radioactive form of adamantium developed in Russia. Omega Red's coils and Deadpool's katanas are made of carbonadium.
- Cogmium is a unique metal alloy invented by Oracle Inc. A.I.M. attempted to steal a shipment of Cogmium, but their mission was thwarted by Iron Fist.
- Gravitonium is a fictitious element on the periodic table. It can control gravity and is the main source of Graviton's powers in Agents of S.H.I.E.L.D.
- Mysterium is a metal formed in the White Hot Room with antimagic properties.
- Netheranium is a psychosensitive metal found only in "Satan's" extra-dimensional realm. The Son of Satan, Daimon Hellstrom, wields a trident made of netheranium.
- Plandanium is a metal used by the Spaceknights of Galador to make their armor.
- Promethium, not to be confused with the real-life element, or the material of the same name which appears in DC Comics, is a magical metal found in Otherplace.
- Scabrite is a metal which can only be found in the mines of Surtur's realm. Surtur's sword Twilight is made of Scabrite.
- Tritonium is an unstable radioactive mineral.
- Uru is an Asgardian metal from which Thor's hammer is made.
- Vibranium is a metal which comes in two forms; Wakandan vibranium absorbs vibratory and kinetic energy, while Antarctic vibranium causes all nearby metals to melt. Vibranium is a component of Captain America's shield.
- Yaka is a sound-sensitive metal found on Centauri IV. Yaka metal is incorporated into the arrows used by Yondu.

== Cosmic forces ==
- The Nova Force is the source of power for the Nova Corps, generated by the Xandarian Worldmind.
- The Odin Force is the source of power for Odin and Thor.
- The Phoenix Force is an entity that embodies life. It takes the form of its namesake and is commonly associated with Jean Grey.
- The Power Cosmic is a primordial cosmic energy used by Galactus and his heralds.
- The Power Primordial is a primordial cosmic energy used by the Elders of the Universe.
- The Uni-Power is the source of power for Captain Universe.

== See also ==
- List of fictional towns in comics
- DC Comics:
  - List of DC Universe locations
  - List of DC Comics teams and organizations
  - List of government agencies in DC Comics
  - List of criminal organizations in DC Comics
