= Don Berry (author) =

American novelist (1932–2001)

- Born: Don George Berry; January 23, 1932
- Died: February 20, 2001
- Education: Reed College
- Occupations: Novelist, historian, screenwriter, artist
- Writing career
- Notable work: Oregon Country trilogy
- Notable awards: National Book Award; 1963 Moontrap – Novel

Don George Berry (January 23, 1932 – February 20, 2001) was an American author and artist best known for his trilogy of historical novels about early settlers in the Oregon Country. Described as one of "Oregon's best fiction writers of the post-World War II generation", and a "Forgotten Beat", Berry's second novel, Moontrap (1962), was nominated for the National Book Award in 1963.

== Early life and education ==
Berry was born in Redwood Falls, Minnesota, the son of a banjo player and a swing band singer who separated when Berry was 2 years old. Berry moved to Oregon with his mother when he was still in his teens, living in the Vanport housing project and attending Roosevelt High School, where he was elected student body president. Following the catastrophic Vanport flood of May 30, 1948, Berry discovered his name erroneously included in the list of over 2,000 missing, a fact which Berry took advantage of to break off ties with his alcoholic mother. After winning a scholarship in mathematics, Berry enrolled at Reed College in Portland, Oregon, which he attended from 1949 to 1951, taking classes with the noted calligrapher Lloyd Reynolds and historian Dorothy Johansen. To support himself during this time, worked in the university bookstore and slept in the boiler room, which he had been hired to tend. After befriending the poet Gary Snyder, who shared Berry's interest in Eastern literature and metaphysics, Berry was invited to move into the basement of 1414 Lambert Street, a house about a mile off campus, where he would live for the next two years. Other residents of the house would include the poets Lew Welch and Philip Whalen, also students at Reed.

Together with Snyder, Welch, and Whalen, who would later informally come to be known as the West Coast Beats, Berry formed the Adelaide Crapsey-Oswald Spengler Mutual Admiration Poetasters Society, devoted to "[drinking] wine, [writing] poetry, and goof[ing] off". During this period, Berry also met his future wife, the artist and author Kajira Wyn Berry.

== Career ==
=== Science fiction ===
In 1956, after 144 rejection letters, Berry sold his first science fiction story, "Routine for a Hornet", which was published in the December issue of If magazine. Over the next two years, Berry published 9 more science fiction stories in various magazines, abandoning the genre with the launch of the Soviet satellite Sputnik in 1957, which he claimed marked the "death of science fiction."

=== Historical novels and nonfiction ===
In the late 1950s, Berry completed his first novel, Trask (1960), a historical account of a fictional episode from the life Elbridge Trask, an Oregon settler in the 1840s who became one of the first white homesteaders on Tillamook Bay. While Hal Borland praised the book for showing "an unusual understanding of the old-time mountain men and Indians and the basic drama of change in the Pacific Northwest", he faulted it for getting "somewhat lost In the obscurities or mysticism and the Inner conflicts of inarticulate white men." More recently however, the spiritual themes of the book have been subject to a critical reappraisal, with Therése Jörgne completing a phenomenological study of the novel in 2012.

Trask was published in hardcover by the New York-based publishing house Viking Books in 1960, and in paperback later the same year by Ballantine, later being re-issued by Comstock Editions. Although some paperback editions of the novel were retitled Trask: the coast of Oregon, 1848, the 2004 re-issue of the book by Oregon State University Press was published under Berry's original title.

Berry followed up on the success of Trask with A Majority of Scoundrels (Harper and Brother, 1961), which provides an "informal history" of the fur trade in the Rocky Mountains through the story of the Rocky Mountain Fur Company.

Berry's second historical novel set in the Oregon Country, Moontrap (1962), was perhaps his best known in his lifetime, having been nominated for the National Book Award in 1963. Moontrap depicts the difficult transition from fur trapping to farming, as experienced by a group of fur trappers and their Native American wives facing off against civic-minded entrepreneurs and the end of frontier justice.

Like his first two Oregon County novels, the final book in Berry's Oregon Country trilogy, To Build a Ship (1963) is based on the diary of Warren Vaughn (1823–1907), an early settler who first arrived in the Tillamook area in December 1852, travelling by foot along the Native American trail over Neahkahnie Mountain and Tillamook Head from Astoria.

According to his wife, Berry later completed a sequel to Trask, which he burned.

=== Documentaries ===
In the late 1960s, Berry was hired to work as a screenwriter and music producer in the film department of KGW, a Portland affiliate of Seattle's KING 5 TV, where he worked with the Hungarian-born filmmaker László Pal. The pair would go on to co-produce a number of documentary films, including Crab Fisherman, Survivor at One O'Clock, and Blue Water Hunters (1988).

=== Berryworks ===
After many years without publishing fiction, in the final six years of his life Berry became early adopter of the Internet for writing, posting dozens of short stories, humorous anecdotes, and philosophical essays to his personal website, "Berryworks". Although the site is no longer maintained, this large body of literature, which includes a memoir and an unfinished fantasy novel set in Minoan Crete has been preserved thanks to the Internet Archive.

== Works ==
=== Short stories ===
- "Routine for a Hornet" If, December 1956
- "Pushover Planet" Super Science-Fiction, June 1957
- "Interference" Science Fiction Quarterly, August 1957, republished as "Korrektur der Vergangenheit" in Utopia-Science-Fiction-Magazin, #26, June 1959
- "Song of the Axe" Super Science-Fiction, October 1957, republished in Robert Silverberg ed. Tales from Super-Science Fiction (Haffner Press, 2012)
- "Familiar Face" Fantastic Universe, February 1958
- "Intruder" Venture Science Fiction Magazine, March 1958, republished in Venture Science Fiction [UK], October 1964
- "Problem in Ecology", Future Science Fiction, no. 36, April 1958
- "The Raider" If, April 1958
- "Sound of Terror" If, June 1958, republished in Worlds of If Super Pack #3 (Positronic Publishing, 2017)
- "Man Alone" If, October 1958

=== Novels ===
- Trask (Viking Books, 1960), republished by Oregon State University Press in 2004
- Moontrap (Viking Books, 1962), republished 2004
- To Build a Ship (Viking Books, 1963), republished 2004
- Sketches from the Palace at Knossos (1995-2001), unfinished

=== Nonfiction ===
- A Majority of Scoundrels (Harper and Brother, 1961), republished as A Majority of Scoundrels: : An Informal History of the Rocky Mountain Fur Company by Oregon State University Press in 2006
- Magic Harbor (1995–2001)

== Personal life ==
Following Berry and Wyn's marriage in 1957, Berry became a step-father to three children from a previous marriage. David, Bonny and Duncan (oldest to youngest) are the names of his step-children. In the mid-1960s, the family moved to the Oregon coast, where they spent several years living off the land in a rustic cabin. After a period of touring the Caribbean on a 55-foot ketch, the family moved to Vashon Island in 1974, living on a boat before moving into a home in the inner harbor. Berry and Wyn separated in 1987, and Berry returned to living on boat in 1995, an experience which he describes in his nonfiction memoir, Magic Harbor (1995–2001). Besides writing, Berry's lifelong artistic pursuits included bronze sculpture, sumi-e painting, and blues guitar playing. He died in Seattle in 2001.
