= John Trask =

John Trask may refer to:

- John Trask (cricketer) (1861–1896), English cricketer and army medical officer
- John Trask (soccer), head men's soccer coach at the University of Wisconsin-Madison

== See also ==
- John Traske, Sabbatarian
