= Dorothy Johansen =

American historian

- Born: Dorothy Olga Johansen; 19 May 1904; Seaside, Oregon
- Education: Reed College (B.A.); University of Washington (M.A., Ph.D)
- Occupation: Historian
- Awards: Oregon Historical Society Award

Dorothy Olga Johansen (19 May 1904 – 13 December 1999) was an American historian of the Pacific Northwest.

== Life and work ==
Dorothy Johansen was born in Seaside, Oregon on 19 May 1904. She taught school in Oregon from 1922 to 1927 and then in Yakima, Washington, in 1927–30. She received her B.A. from Reed College in 1933, her M.A. from the University of Washington two years later and her Ph.D. in 1941 from the same institution. Johansen became an instructor in history at Reed in 1938; she was promoted to assistant professor in 1943 and professor of history and humanities in 1958 until her retirement in 1969. In 1941 she received an award for Pacific history from the Pacific Coast branch of the American Historical Association. Johansen was a director of the Oregon Historical Society and a member of the Pacific Northwest Quarterly and America: History and Life advisory boards. She also received the Oregon Historical Society Award in 1958. A year prior, she wrote Empire of the Columbia: A History of The Pacific Northwest, with Charles M. Gates. In 1959 Johansen wrote Robert Newell’s Memoranda and Voyage of the Columbia: Around the World with John Boit, 1790–1793. In 1966 she was president of the Pacific Coast branch of the American Historical Association.
