= William Trask =

English cricketer

Personal information
- Full name: William Trask
- Born: 15 July 1859; Broadshard, Norton-sub-Hamdon, Ilminster, Somerset, England
- Died: 24 June 1949 (aged 89); Frome, Somerset, England
- Batting: Right-handed
- Bowling: Right-arm slow

Domestic team information
- Years: Team
- 1882–1900: Somerset

Career statistics
Competition	FC
Matches	48
Runs scored	1225
Batting average	14.41
100s/50s	0/4
Top score	76
Balls bowled	983
Wickets	12
Bowling average	37.83
5 wickets in innings	0
10 wickets in match	0
Best bowling	3/33
Catches/stumpings	20/–
- Source: CricketArchive, 22 December 2015

William Trask (15 July 1859 – 24 June 1949) was an English cricketer who played for Somerset between 1882 and 1900. A right-hand batsman and occasional right-arm slow bowler, Trask made 48 appearances for his county, scoring 1,225 runs and taking 12 wickets. His cousin, John Trask, also played for Somerset. His daughter, Betty Trask, was a novelist.
