= Betty Trask =

English romantic novelist (1893–1983)

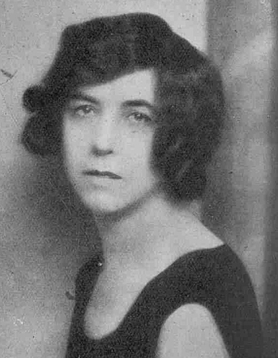
- Betty Trask aged 35 in 1928
- Born: Margaret Elizabeth Lisle Trask; 2 January 1893; Bath, Somerset, England
- Died: 25 January 1983 (aged 90); Frome, Somerset, England
- Occupation: Novelist
- Parent(s): Margaret Stancomb; William Trask

Margaret Elizabeth Lisle Trask (2 January 1893 – 25 January 1983) was an English writer of romance novels.

== Early life ==
Betty Trask was born at 3 Park Lane in Bath, the daughter of William Trask (1859–1949), Chairman of Ham Hill and Doulting Stone Quarries who played cricket for Somerset, and Margaret Stancomb Trask (1863–1957), daughter of Philip Edgar Le Gros, joint owner of Frome Silk and Crepe Mill. Her cousin, Philip Walter Le Gros (1892–1980), was also a notable cricketer.

== Career ==
Betty Trask published her first novel in 1928, called Cotton Glove Country, when she was 35 years old. She then published at least 32 more novels until 1957, an average of one a year, which were published by Hodder & Stoughton, Collins or Robert Hale. She also published short stories in The Royal Magazine, Woman’s Journal and Ladies Home Journal.

Between 1935 and 1952 she also wrote 22 novels under the name Ann Delamain which were published by Constable, Collins and Hurst and Blackett. Only one short story is known under this name, published in Everywoman’s in December 1939. Delamain was a family name: her great great great uncle Thomas Hine of Thomas Hine & Co., married a Frenchwoman, Françoise Elizabeth Delamain, the daughter of another brandy merchant of Jarnac, in southwestern France.

In the five years between 1935 and 1939 Betty Trask published four novels every year. None of her novels are currently in print.

== Personal life and death ==
Betty Trask lived in London with her parents in the 1930s until early in the Second World War when their house was damaged by a bomb during the Blitz, and they returned to live at her mother's family house at North Hill in Frome, Somerset. The family had sold the silk mill in 1926 after her grandfather, Philip Le Gros, had died. Her father died in 1949 and left an estate of small value, indicating that their circumstances had diminished. Betty and her mother moved to a small house on Oakfield Road in Frome, where her mother died in May 1957, the year that Betty Trask published her last novel. Betty lived there quietly and modestly in a small semi-detached house until ill-health forced her into a nursing home, where she died aged 90 in January 1983. Although she wrote stories about love, she was unmarried.

== Legacy ==
In her will Betty Trask made a bequest of almost £400,000 to the Society of Authors to fund an annual literary prize for a first novel, published or unpublished, written in English by an author under the age of 35, which must be of a romantic or traditional nature, not experimental. Because the sum available each year would have made the prize the most valuable in British literature, since 1984 the Society has awarded a Betty Trask Prize, typically of £10,000, to the writer of a chosen novel, and Betty Trask Awards of lesser amounts for up to six other novels each year.

Betty Trask's life as a writer of romance novels, her bequest and her discreet life were celebrated in 1983 in an article in Spanish, La señorita de Somerset, in the Peruvian magazine Caretas by the Nobel prize-winning novelist Mario Vargas Llosa.
