= John Trask (cricketer) =

English cricketer

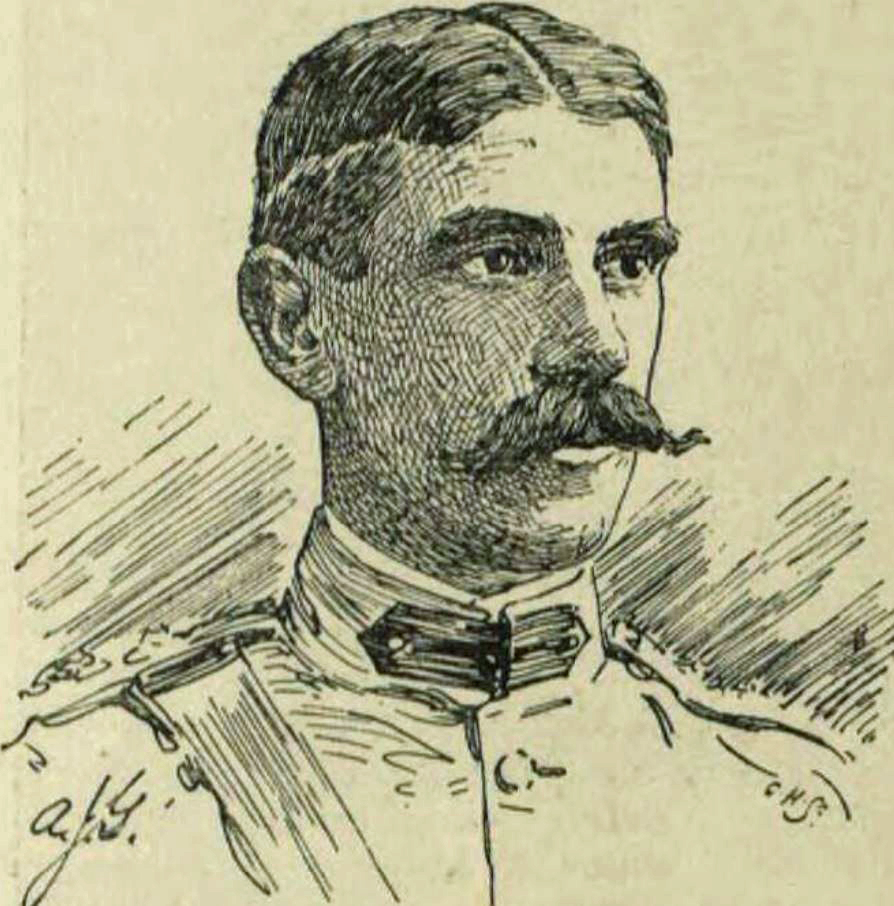

Personal information
- Full name: John Ernest Trask
- Born: 27 October 1861; Brympton, Somerset, England
- Died: 25 July 1896 (aged 34); Kosheh, Sudan
- Height: 5 ft 10 in (178 cm)
- Batting: Right-handed
- Bowling: Right-arm medium
- Role: Batsman
- Relatives: William Trask (cousin)

Domestic team information
- Years: Team
- 1884–1895: Somerset
- 1892–1895: Europeans
- 1892–93: Bombay
- First-class debut: 18 August 1884 Somerset v Hampshire
- Last First-class: 29 July 1895 Somerset v Kent

Career statistics
Competition	First-class
Matches	16
Runs scored	515
Batting average	19.07
100s/50s	0/3
Top score	78
Catches/stumpings	9/–
- Source: CricketArchive, 6 January 2010

Surgeon-Captain John Ernest Trask (27 October 1861 – 25 July 1896) was an English Army doctor and amateur cricketer. He served in the Army Medical Services from 1887 until his death from cholera in Sudan during 1896. He was posthumously mentioned in dispatches, in which he was praised for his role in managing the cholera outbreak. He is thought to have been referred to in Sir Arthur Conan Doyle's 1918 work The New Revelation, as a spirit Doyle converses with.

As a cricketer, Trask made 16 first-class appearances. A batsman, he played nine times for Somerset between 1884 and 1895, and also played during his time in India. He was best known in Somerset as a prominent club cricketer for the Lansdown Cricket Club in Bath, Somerset.

== Early life and Army career ==
John Ernest Trask was born on 27 October 1861 in Brympton, Somerset, the son of James Trask, a prominent local gentleman. After being educated at Somerset College in Bath, Trask attended the Bristol Medical School, and joined the Royal United Hospital in Bath as the house surgeon. He entered the Army Medical Department in 1887, and following a short probationary period he was commissioned on 27 July 1887. After two years at Aldershot, he was posted to India for almost five years. He spent a couple of months back in England during 1895, before being seconded to the Egyptian Army on 23 August 1895. Seeing service in the Sudan Campaign, he was praised for his coolness and bravery during the Battle of Ferkeh.

During this posting, Trask died of cholera during the Dongola Expedition on 25 July 1896. He had contracted cholera at Korosko while tending to others suffering from the disease, and after fighting the illness for a few weeks, he died on the same day as he arrived in Kosheh. He was mentioned in dispatches by Sir Herbert Kitchener (later Earl Kitchener), Commander-in-Chief of the Egyptian Army, in a dispatch dated 30 September 1896. As one of the seven British medical officers in the Egyptian Army, Trask was praised for his part in helping to manage the cholera outbreak. In an official notice relating to his estate published in the London Gazette, his address is given as 40 St James Square, Holland Park.

== Cricket career ==
According to his obituary in the West Somerset Free Press, Trask was best known in Somerset for his cricketing ability, rather than his medical career. He played for Lansdown Cricket Club during his youth alongside his brother, Charles, and his cousin, William Trask. In 1882 William played in Somerset County Cricket Club's inaugural first-class cricket match, and he was a regular in the side throughout the 1880s. John Trask joined his cousin in the county side during 1884, making his debut against Hampshire. During the match, a large victory for Somerset, Trask batted once and scored 30 runs. He played twice more for the county the following summer with less success. Poor results in 1885 saw Somerset lose their first-class status for the following seasons. Trask did turn out for the county during an 1886 match against Warwickshire, but did not then appear for Somerset again until 1890. During his two-year posting in Aldershot from 1887, Trask was made captain of the Aldershot Division cricket team. He was a prolific batsman in club cricket, scoring 185 for Lansdown against Corsham in 1884, and 165 for Netley against Sarisbury Green during his training in 1887.

During 1890, he was available for Somerset again. They had not been admitted back into first-class cricket, and their matches were against a variety of first- and second-class teams. Trask played in six of the thirteen matches, and scored 132 runs at an average of 14.66. His highest score that year was 63 runs, which he made against Staffordshire during an innings victory for Somerset. In all, Somerset won twelve of their thirteen fixtures, and tied the remaining one. They were the best non-first-class county, winning the so-called 'Second-class County Championship'. In doing so, the county side earned readmission into first-class cricket for the following 1891 season.

Trask then travelled to India with the Army, where he remained for four and a half years. During his time in the country he was involved in establishing the presidency matches, in which he made six first-class appearances for the Europeans cricket team, and also played for Bombay. It was during this time that he reached his highest score in first-class cricket, making 78 opening against Parsees. He played six more matches for Somerset on his return home in 1895, but left again after a couple of months to assume his Army posting in Egypt.

== Arthur Conan Doyle's The New Revelation ==
In answer to my questions it claimed to be the spirit of one whom I will call Dodd, who was a famous cricketer, and with whom I had some serious conversation in Cairo before he went up the Nile, where he met his death in the Dongolese Expedition. We have now, I may remark, come to the year 1896 in my experiences.

— Arthur Conan Doyle – The New Revelation

Trask was thought to have been referred to in Sir Arthur Conan Doyle's 1918 work The New Revelation. Doyle gives his own views and thoughts on the relationship between spiritual revelations and conventional religious dogma. Within The New Revelation, he makes reference to a conversation held with a spirit he chooses to call (for the purposes of the book) Dodd. Andrew Lycett, author of The Man Who Created Sherlock Holmes; The Life and Times of Sir Arthur Conan Doyle, claims that this spirit is in fact that of John Trask. Dodd is described as a famous cricketer that Doyle spoke to in Cairo, who had since died as part of the Dongolese Expedition. He then remarks that the event occurred in 1896. These statements all support the assertion that the spirit is Trask, as his posting to the Egyptian Army would likely have seen him in Cairo, while his death is well documented as occurring during the Dongolese Expedition of 1896. His cricketing exploits in England and India may well have also been known to Doyle, who himself played ten first-class matches for the Marylebone Cricket Club (MCC).

== Bibliography ==
- Ashley-Cooper, F. S.; Haygarth, Arthur (2004) [1925]. M. C. C. Cricket Scores and Biographies. Vol. XV. Little Eversden, Cambridgeshire: Roger Heavens. ISBN 1-900592-44-4.
- Foot, David (1986). Sunshine, Sixes and Cider: The History of Somerset Cricket. Newton Abbot, Devon: David & Charles. ISBN 0-7153-8890-8.
- Hill, Stephen (2016). Somerset Cricketers 1882 – 1914. Wellington, Somerset: Halsgrove. ISBN 978-0-85704-291-0.
