= Trask Mountain =

Mountain in Oregon

- Location within Oregon

Highest point
- Elevation: 3,426 ft (1,044 m) NAVD 88
- Prominence: 3,424 ft (1,044 m)
- Listing: Oregon county high points
- Coordinates: 45°22′16″N 123°27′21″W

Geography
- Location: Yamhill County, Oregon, U.S.
- Parent range: Northern Oregon Coast Range
- Topo map: USGS Trask Mountain

Climbing
- Easiest route: Trask Toll Road to just below the summit.

Trask Mountain in the Northern Oregon Coast Range, is the tallest mountain in Yamhill County, Oregon. It is located in the northwest corner of the county. Evidently the mountain was named for Elbridge Trask who settled west of the peak in Tillamook County in 1852.

== Geology ==
The mountain is composed of mainly volcanic rock with some sedimentary rocks. Like much of the northern section of the Oregon Coast Range, the origins began around 40 million years ago during the Eocene period. During this era, sandstone and siltstone formed in the area. Additionally, igneous rocks and basalt flows combined with basaltic sandstone to create many of the mountainous formations. The volcanic rocks come from basalt flows that originated from fissures in the central portion of Oregon and covered much of the state. Additional sedimentary rock was formed more recently, around 20 million years ago.

All of the coast range lies over a convergent tectonic margin interacting with the Juan de Fuca Plate that is subducting beneath North America tectonic plate in the Cascadia subduction zone. The mountains are created by the plunging structural arch of sedimentary and Tertiary volcanic strata that is being uplifted.

== Flora and fauna ==
Vegetation in the area includes Sitka spruce, Douglas-fir, western hemlock, western redcedar, salmonberry, red alder, western sword fern, and vine maple among many others. Other plant life native to the mountains are Coptis laciniata, salal, Oregon-grape, and bracken fern.

Different insects can include spiders, beetles, and various centipedes. Mammals include weasels, chipmunks, black bears, hares and deer. Birds include kinglets, chickadees, woodpeckers, and jays.

== Other ==
In the northwest part of the county, the mountain is in private forest land owned by Weyerhaeuser. Trask Mountain makes up a portion of the North Yamhill River headwaters that drain to the Willamette River. On its north side, drainage is to the Trask River which flows west to the Pacific Ocean. The mountain receives over 135 inches (3,400 mm) of precipitation each year. The mountain is home to a U.S. Geologic Survey seismograph station that was installed in 1991. Previously, the peak was home to a fire lookout station that was abandoned in the 1970s. There are plans to construct a 50 Megawatt wind power facility atop the mountain beginning in 2009.

In 1997, Dundee, Oregon, resident Lee John Knoch beat Robert Allen Holliday nearly to death and buried him alive on Trask Mountain.

== See also ==
- Tillamook Burn
