= Elbridge Trask =

Oregon pioneer (1815–1863)

- Born: July 15, 1815; Beverly, Essex County, Massachusetts
- Died: June 23, 1863 (aged 48); Tillamook, Tillamook County, Oregon
- Resting place: Tillamook, Tillamook County, Oregon
- Other name: Eldridge Trask
- Occupations: frontiersman, hunter, fur trapper, guide, explorer
- Employer(s): Columbia River Fishing and Trading Company, partner with Jim Bridger, self-employed
- Spouse: Hannah Able

Elbridge Trask also known as Eldridge Trask (July 15, 1815 – June 23, 1863) was an American fur trapper and mountain man in the Oregon Country. Immortalized by a series of modern historical novels by Don Berry, he is best known as an early white settler along Tillamook Bay on the coast of the U.S. state of Oregon. The Trask River and Trask Mountain along the Northern Oregon Coast Range are also named after him.

== Early life ==
Elbridge Trask (aka Eldridge Trask) was born on July 15, 1815, in Beverly, Massachusetts. He was the son of John and Bethiah Trask.

== Frontiersman ==
In 1835, Elbridge Trask joined the employ of the Columbia River Fishing and Trading Company of Nathaniel Jarvis Wyeth. In December he arrived at Fort Hall in present-day Idaho and joined his first trapping expedition with experienced mountain men the following December. Much of what is known about this portion of his life comes from the journals of his traveling companion Osborne Russell. In January 1838 he camped at Jackson Hole with Jim Bridger and spent the next year acquiring a large number of beaver pelts in the Yellowstone area. In August 1839, he became separated from his party, which waited for him for several days until threat of an attack from the Blackfoot forced his party to return to Fort Hall. The following month he returned to Fort Hall by himself unharmed. On August 22, 1842, while in the Snake River valley, he and Osborne Russell joined a wagon train led by the missionary Dr Elijah White headed the Willamette Valley.

== Marriage and family ==
While serving as a guide for the wagon train, Elbridge Trask met Hannah Able, a young widow from Indiana with a baby daughter traveling with the William T. Perry wagon. On arriving at Willamette Falls at present-day Oregon City, the two were married on October 20, 1842.

Elbridge Trask and his wife Hannah set up a homestead in Clatsop Plains near Astoria at the mouth of the Columbia River. In 1852, they left the Clatsop Plains to settle near Tillamook Bay south along the coast. They were the first white family to settle in the bay, establishing a homestead along the Trask River, which is named for him. Trask Mountain 3,412 feet (1,040 m) in the Northern Oregon Coast Range is also named after him.

As conflict between the white settlers and the natives of the Tillamook region grew, Trask met with the last free leaders of the Tillamook people, Chief Kilchis and Chief Illga, to negotiate a peace agreement, but conflicts continued intermittently.

== Death ==
Elbridge Trask died on June 23, 1863, near Tillamook in Tillamook County, Oregon. He was buried on his own property.

== In popular culture ==
In 1960 Elbridge Trask was popularized in the historical novel Trask by Don Berry. The novel, as well as its two sequels, are collectively known as the "Trask novels."
