= Humanity's Last Stand =

Fictional comic book group

Publication information
- Publisher: Marvel Comics
- First appearance: Uncanny X-Men Annual #19 (November 1995)

In-story information
- Type of organization: Terrorist
- Base(s): Appalachian Mountains
- Leader(s): Simon Trask; Preacher
- Agent(s): Joelle Guthrie

Humanity's Last Stand is a fictional radical anti-mutant fringe group appearing in American comic books published by Marvel Comics. The characters are depicted as enemies of the X-Men. The group's first appearance was in Uncanny X-Men Annual 1995.

== History ==
Humanity's Last Stand is behind the creation of a false Mutant Liberation Front, formed by human members of H.L.S. posing as mutants. The humans use drugs and technologically enhanced suits to mimic mutant powers. The goal of this is to discredit mutants. They also attempt to murder humans who sympathized with mutants, which led them to battle the Punisher and his allies.

== Members ==
- Simon Trask - Founder and brother of Bolivar Trask. He has a technological wire in his body.
- Eli Garibaldi
- Joelle Guthrie - Joelle is the sister of X-Men members Sam Guthrie and Paige Guthrie. She quits Humanity's Last Stand after the group threatens her siblings.
- Tim Preacher - Quit
- Lieutenant Commander Coral Trent
- Commander Jared McGee
- Sean Lockwood
- Hound
- The Razors - Robots with techno-organic armor. They were later found and utilized by the Cabots against the Guthrie family and the X-Men.
- The Shepherds - Robots incorporating Nimrod technology.

=== Mutant Liberation Front ===
Agents of Humanity's Last Stand, this group were normal humans empowered by either drugs or special costumes. They claimed to be mutants in order to defame mutants. Among its members are:

- Deadeye (Antonio LeBlanco) - He wears armor that allows him to fire plasma blasts from his eye. He was killed by the X-Cutioner.
- Deadeye (clone) - A clone of the original. It was presumably killed in the destruction of Humanity's Last Stand's base.
- Blast Furnace - A robot that could incinerate compromised members and is operated by remote control. After destroying Deadeye's corpse, it destroys itself.
- Blast Furnace II - A second version of the original. It was destroyed by the Punisher.
- Corpus Delecti (Charles Spencer) - A melding of a dead person and mechanics. This entity has superhuman strength, immunity to most forms of harm, and a personal energy field. When the team's original mission is compromised, he is incinerated by Blast Furnace.
- Corpus Delecti (clone) - A clone of the original. Killed by the Punisher.
- Blindspot (Rose Smith) - She could generate flashes of light from her hands. She is killed by Simon Trask after refusing to battle the Punisher.
- Thermal (Harry Riddle) - He could generate blasts of heat or cold.
